= 2019 VLN Series =

Motorsport season

The 2019 VLN Series was the 42nd season of the VLN and the last one with the VLN name.

The drivers championship was won by Yannick Fübrich and David Griessner, driving a BMW M240i Racing Cup for Adrenalin Motorsport.

== Calendar ==
Rnd.	Race	Length	Circuit	Date
1	65. ADAC Westfalenfahrt	4 hours	(Germany) Nürburgring Nordschleife	March 23
2	44. DMV 4-Stunden-Rennen	4 hours	(Germany) Nürburgring Nordschleife	April 13
3	61. ADAC ACAS H&R-Cup	4 hours	(Germany) Nürburgring Nordschleife	April 27
4	50. Adenauer ADAC Rundstrecken-Trophy	4 hours	(Germany) Nürburgring Nordschleife	July 13
5	ROWE 6 Stunden ADAC Ruhr-Pokal-Rennen	6 hours	(Germany) Nürburgring Nordschleife	August 3
6	42. RCM DMV Grenzlandrennen	4 hours	(Germany) Nürburgring Nordschleife	September 7
7	59. ADAC Reinoldus-Langstreckenrennen	4 hours	(Germany) Nürburgring Nordschleife	September 28
8	51. ADAC Barbarossapreis	4 hours	(Germany) Nürburgring Nordschleife	October 12
9	44. DMV Münsterlandpokal	4 hours	(Germany) Nürburgring Nordschleife	October 26

== Entry Lists ==
Entries are split into multiple different classes:

- SP9 – For FIA-homologated GT3 cars.
- SPX – 'Special vehicles' which do not fit into any other class.
- SP7 – Purpose-built racecars with an engine capacity between 3500 and 3999cc.
- Cup 2 – Porsche Carrera Cup cars.
- SP8 – Purpose-built racecars with an engine capacity over 4000cc.
- SP8T – Purpose-built racecars with an engine capacity over 4000cc and a turbocharger.
- SP10 – For FIA- and SRO-homologated GT4 cars.
- SP6 – Purpose-built racecars with an engine capacity between 3000 and 3499cc.
- SP4 – Purpose-built racecars with an engine capacity between 2000 and 2499cc.
- SP4T – Purpose-built racecars with an engine capacity between 2000 and 2499cc and a turbocharger.
- SP3 – Purpose-built racecars with an engine capacity between 1750 and 2999cc.
- SP3T – Purpose-built racecars with an engine capacity between 1750 and 2999cc and a turbocharger.
- SP-Pro – Prototype racecars with an engine capacity over 3000cc.
- SP2T – Purpose-built racecars with an engine capacity between 1400 and 1749cc and a turbocharger.
- V6 – Production cars with an engine capacity over 3500cc.
- V5 – Production cars with an engine capacity between 2500cc and 2999cc.
- VT3 – Production cars with an engine capacity over 3000cc and a turbocharger.
- VT2 – Production cars with an engine capacity between 2000 and 2999cc and a turbocharger.
- H2 – Pre-2008 production cars and purpose-built racecars with an engine capacity between 2000 and 6249cc.
- AT(-G) – Vehicles using alternative fuel sources (e.g. electric, LPG, hydrogen, etc.)
- Cup 5 – BMW M235i Racing Cup
- V4 – Production cars with an engine capacity between 2000 and 2499cc.
- TCR – FIA-homologated TCR Touring Cars.
- Cup X – KTM X-Bow Cup.
- Cup 3 – Porsche Cayman GT4 Trophy.

=== SP9 ===
Team	Car	No.	Drivers	Events
(Germany) GetSpeed Performance	Mercedes-AMG GT3	2	(Germany) Marek Böckmann	1, 4–5
(Germany) GetSpeed Performance	Mercedes-AMG GT3	2	(France) Tristan Vautier	1, 3
(Germany) GetSpeed Performance	Mercedes-AMG GT3	2	(Germany) Luca Ludwig	1
(Germany) GetSpeed Performance	Mercedes-AMG GT3	2	(Germany) Fabian Vettel	2
(Germany) GetSpeed Performance	Mercedes-AMG GT3	2	(United Kingdom) Philip Ellis	2, 4–6, 8–9
(Germany) GetSpeed Performance	Mercedes-AMG GT3	2	(Germany) Jan Seyffarth	2–3
(Germany) GetSpeed Performance	Mercedes-AMG GT3	2	(Germany) Christopher Brück	2
(Germany) GetSpeed Performance	Mercedes-AMG GT3	2	(Germany) Kenneth Heyer	3
(Germany) GetSpeed Performance	Mercedes-AMG GT3	2	(Netherlands) Renger van der Zande	3
(Germany) GetSpeed Performance	Mercedes-AMG GT3	2	(Austria) Dominik Baumann	6–7, 9
(Germany) GetSpeed Performance	Mercedes-AMG GT3	2	(Germany) Fabian Schiller	7
(Germany) GetSpeed Performance	Mercedes-AMG GT3	2	(Germany) Maximilian Götz	8
(Germany) GetSpeed Performance	Mercedes-AMG GT3	23	(United States) Janine Hill	All
(Germany) GetSpeed Performance	Mercedes-AMG GT3	23	(United States) John Shoffner	All
(Germany) GetSpeed Performance	Mercedes-AMG GT3	23	(Germany) Fabian Schiller	All
(Germany) GetSpeed Performance	Mercedes-AMG GT3	24	(Germany) Fabian Vettel	1
(Germany) GetSpeed Performance	Mercedes-AMG GT3	24	(United Kingdom) Philip Ellis	1
(Germany) GetSpeed Performance	Mercedes-AMG GT3	24	(Netherlands) Indy Dontje	1
(Germany) Falken Motorsports	BMW M6 GT3	3	(Switzerland) Alexandre Imperatori	1, 3, 6, 8
(Germany) Falken Motorsports	BMW M6 GT3	3	(Germany) Jens Klingmann	1–2, 5
(Germany) Falken Motorsports	BMW M6 GT3	3	(United Kingdom) Peter Dumbreck	2, 6–8
(Germany) Falken Motorsports	BMW M6 GT3	3	(Netherlands) Stef Dusseldorp	3, 5, 7
(Germany) Falken Motorsports	BMW M6 GT3	3	(South Africa) Sheldon van der Linde	8
(Germany) Falken Motorsports	Porsche 911 GT3 R	4	(Austria) Klaus Bachler	1, 5–6, 8
(Germany) Falken Motorsports	Porsche 911 GT3 R	4	(Germany) Jörg Bergmeister	1, 7
(Germany) Falken Motorsports	Porsche 911 GT3 R	4	(Austria) Martin Ragginger	3, 5–8
(Germany) Falken Motorsports	Porsche 911 GT3 R	4	(Germany) Dirk Werner	3
(Germany) Falken Motorsports	Porsche 911 GT3 R	4	(Germany) Sven Müller	9
(Germany) Falken Motorsports	Porsche 911 GT3 R	4	(France) Patrick Pilet	9
(Germany) Phoenix Racing	Audi R8 LMS Evo	5	(Germany) Vincent Kolb	All
(Germany) Phoenix Racing	Audi R8 LMS Evo	5	(Germany) Frank Stippler	1–2, 4–6, 8–9
(Germany) Phoenix Racing	Audi R8 LMS Evo	5	(United Kingdom) Jamie Green	2
(Germany) Phoenix Racing	Audi R8 LMS Evo	5	(Luxembourg) Steve Jans	3, 6–7
(Germany) Phoenix Racing	Audi R8 LMS Evo	9	(Luxembourg) Steve Jans	1, 5, 8–9
(Germany) Phoenix Racing	Audi R8 LMS Evo	9	(Germany) Kim-Luis Schramm	1, 8–9
(Germany) Phoenix Racing	Audi R8 LMS Evo	9	(Italy) Michele Beretta	5, 8–9
(Germany) Phoenix Racing	Audi R8 LMS Evo	9	(Denmark) Nicolaj Møller Madsen	5
(Germany) Phoenix Racing	Audi R8 LMS Evo	15	(Switzerland) Marcel Fässler	3
(Germany) Phoenix Racing	Audi R8 LMS Evo	15	(United Kingdom) Jamie Green	3
(Germany) Black Falcon	Mercedes-AMG GT3	6	(Germany) Patrick Assenheimer	1, 3–6, 8–9
(Germany) Black Falcon	Mercedes-AMG GT3	6	(Netherlands) Yelmer Buurman	1, 3
(Germany) Black Falcon	Mercedes-AMG GT3	6	(Italy) Gabriele Piana	1
(Germany) Black Falcon	Mercedes-AMG GT3	6	(Germany) Nico Bastian	3
(Germany) Black Falcon	Mercedes-AMG GT3	6	(Switzerland) Manuel Metzger	4, 6, 8
(Germany) Black Falcon	Mercedes-AMG GT3	6	(Germany) Maro Engel	5, 9
(Germany) Black Falcon	Mercedes-AMG GT3	14	(United Kingdom) Adam Christodoulou	3
(Germany) Black Falcon	Mercedes-AMG GT3	14	(Germany) Maro Engel	3
(Germany) Black Falcon	Mercedes-AMG GT3	14	(Switzerland) Manuel Metzger	3
(Germany) Black Falcon	Mercedes-AMG GT3	14	(Germany) Dirk Müller	3
(Germany) Black Falcon	Mercedes-AMG GT3	16	(Germany) Hubert Haupt	3, 5, 9
(Germany) Black Falcon	Mercedes-AMG GT3	16	(Germany) Luca Stolz	3, 5
(Germany) Black Falcon	Mercedes-AMG GT3	16	(Germany) Maximilian Buhk	3
(Germany) Black Falcon	Mercedes-AMG GT3	16	(United Kingdom) Adam Christodoulou	5, 9
(Germany) Black Falcon	Mercedes-AMG GT3	16	(Germany) Dirk Müller	9
(Austria) Konrad Motorsport	Lamborghini Huracán GT3 Evo	7	(Germany) Michele di Martino	1–8
(Austria) Konrad Motorsport	Lamborghini Huracán GT3 Evo	7	(Switzerland) Marco Mapelli	1
(Austria) Konrad Motorsport	Lamborghini Huracán GT3 Evo	7	(France) Franck Pereira	1, 8
(Austria) Konrad Motorsport	Lamborghini Huracán GT3 Evo	7	(Netherlands) Tom Coronel	2
(Austria) Konrad Motorsport	Lamborghini Huracán GT3 Evo	7	(Finland) Matias Henkola	3
(Austria) Konrad Motorsport	Lamborghini Huracán GT3 Evo	7	(Zimbabwe) Axcil Jefferies	4–8
(Austria) Konrad Motorsport	Lamborghini Huracán GT3 Evo	7	(United Kingdom) Michael Lyons	5
(Austria) Konrad Motorsport	Lamborghini Huracán GT3 Evo	7	(Italy) Mirko Bortolotti	8
(Germany) IronForce Racing	Porsche 911 GT3 R	8	(Switzerland) Lucas Luhr	1–2
(Germany) IronForce Racing	Porsche 911 GT3 R	8	(Belgium) Adrien de Leener	1–2
(Germany) IronForce Racing	Porsche 911 GT3 R	8	(Germany) Jan-Erik Slooten	1–2
(Germany) IronForce Racing	Porsche 911 GT3 R	8	(Luxembourg) Steve Jans	2
(Germany) Manthey Racing	Porsche 911 GT3 R	12	(Germany) Otto Klohs	3
(Germany) Manthey Racing	Porsche 911 GT3 R	12	(Norway) Dennis Olsen	3
(Germany) Manthey Racing	Porsche 911 GT3 R	911	(New Zealand) Earl Bamber	1
(Germany) Manthey Racing	Porsche 911 GT3 R	911	(Belgium) Laurens Vanthoor	1
(Germany) Manthey Racing	Porsche 911 GT3 R	911	(Denmark) Michael Christensen	3
(Germany) Manthey Racing	Porsche 911 GT3 R	911	(France) Kévin Estre	3, 6
(Germany) Manthey Racing	Porsche 911 GT3 R	911	(Germany) Lars Kern	6, 9
(Germany) Manthey Racing	Porsche 911 GT3 R	911	(Germany) Otto Klohs	6
(Germany) Manthey Racing	Porsche 911 GT3 R	911	(France) Mathieu Jaminet	9
(Germany) Manthey Racing	Porsche 911 GT3 R	911	(Germany) Dirk Werner	9
(Germany) Manthey Racing	Porsche 911 GT3 R	912	(France) Frédéric Makowiecki	1
(Germany) Manthey Racing	Porsche 911 GT3 R	912	(France) Patrick Pilet	1
(Germany) Manthey Racing	Porsche 911 GT3 R	912	(Austria) Richard Lietz	3
(Germany) Manthey Racing	Porsche 911 GT3 R	912	(United Kingdom) Nick Tandy	3
(Germany) Team Zakspeed	Dodge Viper GT3-R	13	(Germany) Florian Strauß	1–2
(Germany) Team Zakspeed	Dodge Viper GT3-R	13	(Netherlands) Jeroen Bleekemolen	1–2
(Germany) Team Zakspeed	Dodge Viper GT3-R	13	(Germany) Christian Mamerow	1–2
(Germany) Team Zakspeed	Dodge Viper GT3-R	13	(Germany) Daniel Keilwitz	9
(Germany) Team Zakspeed	Dodge Viper GT3-R	13	(Germany) Hendrik Still	9
(Belgium) Team WRT	Audi R8 LMS Evo	17	(France) François Perrodo	4, 6, 9
(Belgium) Team WRT	Audi R8 LMS Evo	17	(France) Emmanuel Collard	4, 6, 9
(Belgium) Team WRT	Audi R8 LMS Evo	17	(France) Matthieu Vaxivière	4, 6, 9
(Germany) GTronix 360 mcchip-dkr	Lamborghini Huracán GT3 Evo	20	(Germany) "Dieter Schmidtmann"	2, 4–9
(Germany) GTronix 360 mcchip-dkr	Lamborghini Huracán GT3 Evo	20	(Germany) Heiko Hammel	2, 4–9
(Germany) GTronix 360 mcchip-dkr	Lamborghini Huracán GT3 Evo	20	(France) Franck Perera	5–6
(Germany) Audi Sport Team Land	Audi R8 LMS Evo	29	(South Africa) Kelvin van der Linde	1
(Germany) Audi Sport Team Land	Audi R8 LMS Evo	29	(Belgium) Dries Vanthoor	1
(Germany) Audi Sport Team Land	Audi R8 LMS Evo	29	(Germany) René Rast	1–2
(Germany) Audi Sport Team Land	Audi R8 LMS Evo	29	(Germany) Christopher Mies	2
(Germany) Frikadelli Racing Team	Porsche 911 GT3 R	30	(Germany) Klaus Abbelen	1–3
(Germany) Frikadelli Racing Team	Porsche 911 GT3 R	30	(Germany) Sabine Schmitz	1–2
(Germany) Frikadelli Racing Team	Porsche 911 GT3 R	30	(Switzerland) Alexander Müller	1–3
(Germany) Frikadelli Racing Team	Porsche 911 GT3 R	30	(Germany) Felipe Fernández Laser	2–3
(Germany) Frikadelli Racing Team	Porsche 911 GT3 R	31	(Australia) Matthew Campbell	1
(Germany) Frikadelli Racing Team	Porsche 911 GT3 R	31	(France) Mathieu Jaminet	1, 3
(Germany) Frikadelli Racing Team	Porsche 911 GT3 R	31	(Germany) Sven Müller	3
(Germany) Frikadelli Racing Team	Porsche 911 GT3 R	31	(France) Romain Dumas	3
(Germany) Car Collection Motorsport	Audi R8 LMS Evo	32	(Austria) Christopher Haase	1
(Germany) Car Collection Motorsport	Audi R8 LMS Evo	32	(Germany) Markus Winkelhock	1
(Germany) Car Collection Motorsport	Audi R8 LMS Evo	32	(Germany) Frank Stippler	2, 6
(Germany) Car Collection Motorsport	Audi R8 LMS Evo	32	(Switzerland) Pierre Kaffer	2, 6
(Germany) Car Collection Motorsport	Audi R8 LMS Evo	32	(Belgium) Frédéric Vervisch	2
(Germany) Car Collection Motorsport	Audi R8 LMS Evo	33	(Germany) Klaus Koch	2, 4, 6
(Germany) Car Collection Motorsport	Audi R8 LMS Evo	33	(Germany) Christian Bollrath	2
(Germany) Car Collection Motorsport	Audi R8 LMS Evo	33	(Germany) Peter Schmidt	2, 4, 6, 8
(Germany) Car Collection Motorsport	Audi R8 LMS Evo	33	(Germany) Oliver Bender	4, 6
(Germany) Car Collection Motorsport	Audi R8 LMS Evo	33	(Germany) Elia Erhart	8
(Germany) Car Collection Motorsport	Audi R8 LMS Evo	33	(Germany) Florian Spengler	8
(Germany) Walkenhorst Motorsport	BMW M6 GT3	34	(United Kingdom) David Pittard	All
(Germany) Walkenhorst Motorsport	BMW M6 GT3	34	(Norway) Christian Krognes	1–5, 8–9
(Germany) Walkenhorst Motorsport	BMW M6 GT3	34	(Spain) Lucas Ordóñez	1, 3
(Germany) Walkenhorst Motorsport	BMW M6 GT3	34	(France) Jordan Tresson	2
(Germany) Walkenhorst Motorsport	BMW M6 GT3	34	(United Kingdom) Jody Fannin	4–9
(Germany) Walkenhorst Motorsport	BMW M6 GT3	34	(Netherlands) Nick Catsburg	6–7
(Germany) Walkenhorst Motorsport	BMW M6 GT3	35	(Germany) Rudi Adams	1–8
(Germany) Walkenhorst Motorsport	BMW M6 GT3	35	(United Kingdom) Jody Fannin	1–3
(Germany) Walkenhorst Motorsport	BMW M6 GT3	35	(Germany) Immanuel Vinke	1–3
(Germany) Walkenhorst Motorsport	BMW M6 GT3	35	(United Kingdom) Hunter Abbott	4–5, 7
(Germany) Walkenhorst Motorsport	BMW M6 GT3	35	(France) Jordan Tresson	4–8
(Germany) Walkenhorst Motorsport	BMW M6 GT3	35	(Germany) Jörn Schmidt-Staade	5–6, 8
(Germany) Walkenhorst Motorsport	BMW M6 GT3	36	(Germany) Henry Walkenhorst	1, 3–7
(Germany) Walkenhorst Motorsport	BMW M6 GT3	36	(Germany) Andreas Ziegler	1–7
(Germany) Walkenhorst Motorsport	BMW M6 GT3	36	(United Kingdom) Hunter Abbott	1–3
(Germany) Walkenhorst Motorsport	BMW M6 GT3	36	(Germany) Peter Posavac	2, 5
(Germany) Walkenhorst Motorsport	BMW M6 GT3	36	(Germany) Jörn Schmidt-Staade	4, 7
(Germany) Walkenhorst Motorsport	BMW M6 GT3	36	(Norway) Anders Buchardt	5–6
(Germany) Bandoh Racing	Lexus RC F GT3	37	(Germany) Dominik Farnbacher	3
(Germany) Bandoh Racing	Lexus RC F GT3	37	(Germany) Marco Seefried	3
(Hong Kong) KCMG	Nissan GT-R Nismo GT3	38	(United Kingdom) Alex Buncombe	1
(Hong Kong) KCMG	Nissan GT-R Nismo GT3	38	(Germany) Christian Menzel	1–3
(Hong Kong) KCMG	Nissan GT-R Nismo GT3	38	(Germany) Philipp Wlazik	1–3
(Hong Kong) KCMG	Nissan GT-R Nismo GT3	38	(Switzerland) Alex Fontana	1
(Hong Kong) KCMG	Nissan GT-R Nismo GT3	38	(Germany) Christer Jöns	2
(Hong Kong) KCMG	Nissan GT-R Nismo GT3	39	(Germany) Christian Menzel	2
(Hong Kong) KCMG	Nissan GT-R Nismo GT3	39	(Germany) Philipp Wlazik	2
(Hong Kong) KCMG	Nissan GT-R Nismo GT3	39	(Germany) Christer Jöns	3
(Hong Kong) KCMG	Nissan GT-R Nismo GT3	39	(Germany) Nico Menzel	3
(Hong Kong) KCMG	Nissan GT-R Nismo GT3	39	(France) Matthieu Vaxivière	3
(Germany) BMW Team Schnitzer	BMW M6 GT3	42	(Germany) Martin Tomczyk	2
(Germany) BMW Team Schnitzer	BMW M6 GT3	42	(South Africa) Sheldon van der Linde	2–3
(Germany) BMW Team Schnitzer	BMW M6 GT3	42	(Austria) Timo Scheider	2
(Germany) BMW Team Schnitzer	BMW M6 GT3	42	(United Kingdom) Nick Yelloly	3
(Germany) BMW Team Schnitzer	BMW M6 GT3	42	(Brazil) Augusto Farfus Jr.	7–8
(Germany) BMW Team Schnitzer	BMW M6 GT3	42	(Netherlands) Stef Dusseldorp	7
(Germany) BMW Team Schnitzer	BMW M6 GT3	42	(Austria) Philipp Eng	9
(Japan) Kondō Racing	Nissan GT-R Nismo GT3	45	(Netherlands) Tom Coronel	1
(Japan) Kondō Racing	Nissan GT-R Nismo GT3	45	(Japan) Mitsunori Takaboshi	1, 3
(Japan) Kondō Racing	Nissan GT-R Nismo GT3	45	(Japan) Tomonobu Fujii	1, 3
(Japan) Kondō Racing	Nissan GT-R Nismo GT3	45	(Japan) Tsugio Matsuda	1, 3
(Germany) HTP Motorsport	Mercedes-AMG GT3	48	(Germany) Maximilian Götz	1–2
(Germany) HTP Motorsport	Mercedes-AMG GT3	48	(Germany) Christian Hohenadel	1–2
(Germany) HTP Motorsport	Mercedes-AMG GT3	48	(Italy) Raffaele Marciello	1, 8
(Germany) HTP Motorsport	Mercedes-AMG GT3	48	(Germany) Lance David Arnold	2, 7
(Germany) HTP Motorsport	Mercedes-AMG GT3	48	(Germany) Tim Scheerbarth	7
(Germany) HTP Motorsport	Mercedes-AMG GT3	48	(Switzerland) Edoardo Mortara	7
(Germany) HTP Motorsport	Mercedes-AMG GT3	48	(Germany) Maximilian Buhk	8
(Netherlands) Team Équipe-Vitesse	Audi R8 LMS Evo	50	(Germany) Michael Heimrich	4, 6–9
(Netherlands) Team Équipe-Vitesse	Audi R8 LMS Evo	50	(Germany) Arno Klasen	4, 6–9
(Germany) ROWE Racing	BMW M6 GT3	98	(United States) Connor de Phillippi	1
(Germany) ROWE Racing	BMW M6 GT3	98	(Sweden) Tom Blomqvist	1, 3
(Germany) ROWE Racing	BMW M6 GT3	98	(Denmark) Mikkel Jensen	1, 3
(Germany) ROWE Racing	BMW M6 GT3	98	(Austria) Philipp Eng	3
(Germany) ROWE Racing	BMW M6 GT3	99	(Netherlands) Nick Catsburg	1, 5
(Germany) ROWE Racing	BMW M6 GT3	99	(Germany) Marco Wittmann	1, 3
(Germany) ROWE Racing	BMW M6 GT3	99	(United States) John Edwards	1, 3
(Germany) ROWE Racing	BMW M6 GT3	99	(Finland) Jesse Krohn	3
(Germany) ROWE Racing	BMW M6 GT3	99	(Austria) Philipp Eng	5

=== SPX ===
Team	Car	No.	Drivers	Rounds
(United States) Scuderia Cameron Glickenhaus	Scuderia Cameron Glickenhaus SCG 003	51	(Germany) Thomas Mutsch	1
(United States) Scuderia Cameron Glickenhaus	Scuderia Cameron Glickenhaus SCG 003	51	(Germany) Felipe Fernández Laser	1
(United States) Scuderia Cameron Glickenhaus	Scuderia Cameron Glickenhaus SCG 003	51	(France) Franck Mailleux	1
(Germany) Black Falcon	Mercedes-AMG GT3 Evo	52	(Austria) Dominik Baumann	2
(Germany) Black Falcon	Mercedes-AMG GT3 Evo	52	(Germany) Thomas Jäger	2
(Germany) Black Falcon	Mercedes-AMG GT3 Evo	52	(United Kingdom) Adam Christodoulou	2
(Germany) Black Falcon	Mercedes-AMG GT3 Evo	54	(Netherlands) Yelmer Buurman	8
(Germany) Black Falcon	Mercedes-AMG GT3 Evo	54	(Germany) Luca Stolz	8
(Switzerland) Octane126	Ferrari 488 GTE	55	(Germany) Björn Grossmann	1, 3, 6, 8
(Switzerland) Octane126	Ferrari 488 GTE	55	(Switzerland) Simon Trummer	1, 3, 6
(Switzerland) Octane126	Ferrari 488 GTE	55	(Switzerland) Jonathan Hirschi	3, 6, 8
(Germany) Christian Hohenadel	Mercedes-AMG GT3 Evo	56	(Germany) Christian Hohenadel	9
(Germany) Christian Hohenadel	Mercedes-AMG GT3 Evo	56	(Germany) Maximilian Buhk	9
(Germany) Christian Hohenadel	Mercedes-AMG GT3 Evo	56	(Germany) Maximilian Götz	9

=== SP7 ===
Team	Car	#	Drivers	Events
(Germany) Black Falcon	Porsche 911 GT3 Cup	57	(United States) Peter Ludwig	2–8
(Germany) Black Falcon	Porsche 911 GT3 Cup	57	(Switzerland) "Takis"	2–6, 8
(Germany) Black Falcon	Porsche 911 GT3 Cup	57	(Netherlands) Jeroen Bleekemolen	2
(Germany) Black Falcon	Porsche 911 GT3 Cup	57	(Switzerland) Manuel Metzger	3–4, 6, 8
(Germany) Black Falcon	Porsche 911 GT3 Cup	57	(Germany) Maik Rosenberg	5, 7, 9
(Germany) Black Falcon	Porsche 911 GT3 Cup	57	(Germany) Carlos Rivas	5, 9
	Porsche 911 GT3 Cup	58	(United Kingdom) Bill Cameron	4–9
	Porsche 911 GT3 Cup	58	(Germany) Peter Bonk	4–9
(Germany) ACV-Motorsportclub Göge	Porsche 911 GT3 Cup	66	(Germany) Thomas Kappeler	1–8
(Germany) ACV-Motorsportclub Göge	Porsche 911 GT3 Cup	66	(Switzerland) Willy Hüppi	1–8
(Germany) ACV-Motorsportclub Göge	Porsche 911 GT3 Cup	66	(Germany) Thomas Gerling	1–8
(Germany) clickversicherung.de	Porsche 911 GT3 Cup	69	(Germany) Kersten Jodexnis	1–2, 4–5, 8–9
(Germany) clickversicherung.de	Porsche 911 GT3 Cup	69	(Germany) Marco Schelp	1–2
(Germany) clickversicherung.de	Porsche 911 GT3 Cup	69	(Germany) Christopher Brück	2–3
(Germany) clickversicherung.de	Porsche 911 GT3 Cup	69	(Germany) Robin Chrzanowski	3–5, 8–9
(Germany) clickversicherung.de	Porsche 911 GT3 Cup	69	(New Zealand) Peter Scharmach	5
(Germany) rent2drive-FAMILIA-racing	Porsche 911 GT3 Cup	76	(Germany) Andreas Marc Riedl	7–9
(Germany) rent2drive-FAMILIA-racing	Porsche 911 GT3 Cup	76	(Germany) Tim Breidenbach	7
(Germany) rent2drive-FAMILIA-racing	Porsche 911 GT3 Cup	76	(Germany) Philipp Gresek	7
(Germany) rent2drive-FAMILIA-racing	Porsche 911 GT3 Cup	76	(Germany) Richard Gresek	8–9
(Germany) rent2drive-FAMILIA-racing	Porsche 911 GT3 Cup	76	(Germany) "Der Bommel"	8–9
(Germany) rent2drive-FAMILIA-racing	Porsche 911 GT3 Cup	77	(Germany) Jörg Wiskirchen	6
(Germany) rent2drive-FAMILIA-racing	Porsche 911 GT3 Cup	77	(Germany) Andreas Marc Riedl	6
(Germany) rent2drive-FAMILIA-racing	Porsche 911 GT3 Cup	77	(Germany) Richard Gresek	6
(United States) Krohn Racing	Porsche 911 GT3 Cup	78	(United States) Tracy Krohn	1–3
(United States) Krohn Racing	Porsche 911 GT3 Cup	78	(Sweden) Niclas Jönsson	1–3
	Porsche 911 GT3 Cup	79	(Czech Republic) Milan Kodidek	3–8
	Porsche 911 GT3 Cup	79	(Germany) Marcus Löhnert	3–8
	Porsche 911 GT3 Cup	79	(Belgium) Kris Cools	5
(Germany) Huber Motorsport	Porsche 911 GT3 Cup	80	(Sweden) Andreas Simonsen	1–8
(Germany) Huber Motorsport	Porsche 911 GT3 Cup	80	(Germany) Patrick Kolb	1–8
(Germany) Huber Motorsport	Porsche 911 GT3 Cup	80	(Switzerland) Lorenzo di Torrepadula	1, 3–4, 6–8
(Germany) Huber Motorsport	Porsche 911 GT3 Cup	80	(Germany) Johannes Stengel	2, 5
(Germany) Huber Motorsport	Porsche 911 GT3 Cup	80	(Germany) Christoph Rendlen	5
	Porsche 911 GT3 Cup	81	(Liechtenstein) Michael Hagen	1, 3
	Porsche 911 GT3 Cup	81	(Germany) Johannes Stengel	1, 4
	Porsche 911 GT3 Cup	81	(United Kingdom) Teofilo Masera	3–4, 6, 8
	Porsche 911 GT3 Cup	81	(Germany) Lukas Schreier	3
	Porsche 911 GT3 Cup	81	(Germany) Reinhard Huber	6
	Porsche 911 GT3 Cup	81	(United States) Jon Miller	8
	Porsche 911 GT3 Cup	81	(United States) Ramana Lagemann	8
(United States) CP Racing	Porsche 911 GT3 Cup	85	(United States) Charles Putman	2–3
(United States) CP Racing	Porsche 911 GT3 Cup	85	(United States) Charles Espenlaub	2–3
	Porsche 911 GT3 Cup	91	(Germany) Axel Friedhoff	2
	Porsche 911 GT3 Cup	91	(Germany) Max Friedhoff	2

=== Cup 2 ===
Team	Car	No.	Drivers	Rounds
	Porsche 911 GT3 Cup	111	(United Kingdom) Bill Cameron	1–3
	Porsche 911 GT3 Cup	111	(Germany) Peter Bonk	1–3
(Germany) 9und11 Racing Team	Porsche 911 GT3 Cup	120	(Germany) Georg Goder	1–5, 7–9
(Germany) 9und11 Racing Team	Porsche 911 GT3 Cup	120	(Germany) Ralf Öhme	1–3, 7
(Germany) 9und11 Racing Team	Porsche 911 GT3 Cup	120	(Germany) Martin Schlüter	1, 3–5, 7–9
(Germany) 9und11 Racing Team	Porsche 911 GT3 Cup	120	(Germany) Dirk Leßmeister	5
(Belgium) Mühlner Motorsport	Porsche 911 GT3 Cup	123	(Germany) Marcel Hoppe	All
(Belgium) Mühlner Motorsport	Porsche 911 GT3 Cup	123	(Germany) Moritz Kranz	All
(Belgium) Mühlner Motorsport	Porsche 911 GT3 Cup	123	(Germany) Jörn Schmidt-Staade	1–3
(Belgium) Mühlner Motorsport	Porsche 911 GT3 Cup	123	(Germany) Peter Terting	4
(Belgium) Mühlner Motorsport	Porsche 911 GT3 Cup	123	(Germany) Alexander Mies	5, 7
(Belgium) Mühlner Motorsport	Porsche 911 GT3 Cup	123	(Switzerland) Jean-Louis Hertenstein	6, 8
(Belgium) Mühlner Motorsport	Porsche 911 GT3 Cup	123	(United Kingdom) Mark J. Thomas	9
(Belgium) Mühlner Motorsport	Porsche 911 GT3 Cup	123	(Germany) Michael Rebhan	9

=== SP8 ===
Team	Car	#	Drivers	Events
(Germany) WS Racing	Audi R8 LMS GT4	128	(Hong Kong) Yat-Shing Wong	1
(Germany) WS Racing	Audi R8 LMS GT4	128	(Hong Kong) Cheuk-Wai Yan	1
(Germany) WS Racing	Audi R8 LMS GT4	128	(Germany) Thomas Leyherr	2–5
(Germany) WS Racing	Audi R8 LMS GT4	128	(Germany) Bernd Hömberg	2–5
(Germany) WS Racing	Audi R8 LMS GT4	128	(Germany) Arno Klasen	2
(Germany) WS Racing	Audi R8 LMS GT4	128	(Germany) Tim Breidbach	3
(Germany) WS Racing	Audi R8 LMS GT4	128	(Germany) Hendrik Still	4
(Germany) WS Racing	Audi R8 LMS GT4	128	(Germany) Carrie Schreiner	5
(Germany) WS Racing	Audi R8 LMS GT4	128	(Germany) Niklas Kry	8–9
(Germany) WS Racing	Audi R8 LMS GT4	128	(Germany) Thorsten Willems	8
(Germany) WS Racing	Audi R8 LMS GT4	128	(Germany) Dennis Marschall	8
(Germany) WS Racing	Audi R8 LMS GT4	128	(Germany) Ralf Lammering	9
(Germany) rent2drive-FAMILIA-racing	Porsche 911 GT3 Cup	131	(Germany) David Ackermann	1–2, 4–9
(Germany) rent2drive-FAMILIA-racing	Porsche 911 GT3 Cup	131	(Russia) Dmitry Lukovnikov	1–2, 4–9
(Germany) rent2drive-FAMILIA-racing	Porsche 911 GT3 Cup	131	(Hungary) Walter Csaba	1, 4, 7–8
(Germany) rent2drive-FAMILIA-racing	Porsche 911 GT3 Cup	131	(Germany) Marvin Kirchhöfer	5
(Germany) rent2drive-FAMILIA-racing	Porsche 911 GT3 Cup	131	(Germany) Peter Terting	6
(United Kingdom) Aston Martin Racing	Aston Martin Vantage AMR GT4	134	(Germany) Marco Müller	2–3
(United Kingdom) Aston Martin Racing	Aston Martin Vantage AMR GT4	134	(United States) Jesse Menczer	2
(United Kingdom) Aston Martin Racing	Aston Martin Vantage AMR GT4	134	(New Zealand) Tony Richards	3
(United Kingdom) Aston Martin Racing	Aston Martin Vantage AMR GT4	150	(United Kingdom) Martin Brundle	1, 3
(United Kingdom) Aston Martin Racing	Aston Martin Vantage AMR GT4	150	(Germany) Marco Müller	1
(United Kingdom) Aston Martin Racing	Aston Martin Vantage AMR GT4	150	(Sweden) Alexander West	1, 3–4
(United Kingdom) Aston Martin Racing	Aston Martin Vantage AMR GT4	150	(United Kingdom) Chris Goodwin	3
(United Kingdom) Aston Martin Racing	Aston Martin Vantage AMR GT4	150	(Germany) Erik Manning	4
(Germany) Novel Racing	Lexus RC-F	135	(Germany) Uwe Kleen	1, 5
(Germany) Novel Racing	Lexus RC-F	135	(Germany) Klaus Niesen	1, 3
(Germany) Novel Racing	Lexus RC-F	135	(Germany) Klaus Völker	1, 3, 9
(Germany) Novel Racing	Lexus RC-F	135	(Japan) Taketoshi Matsui	2
(Germany) Novel Racing	Lexus RC-F	135	(Japan) Tohjiro Azuma	2
(Germany) Novel Racing	Lexus RC-F	135	(Japan) Yoshinobu Koyama	2–3, 5, 7, 9
(Germany) Novel Racing	Lexus RC-F	135	(Japan) "Asahi Turbo"	5, 9
(Germany) Novel Racing	Lexus RC-F	135	(Japan) Kota Sasaki	7
(Germany) Novel Racing	Lexus IS-F CCS-R	136	(Germany) Klaus Völker	4–6
(Germany) Novel Racing	Lexus IS-F CCS-R	136	(Germany) Helmut Baumann	4–5
(Germany) Novel Racing	Lexus IS-F CCS-R	136	(Germany) Michael Tapella	4
(Germany) Novel Racing	Lexus IS-F CCS-R	136	(Germany) Klaus Niesen	5–6
(Germany) Novel Racing	Lexus IS-F CCS-R	136	(Germany) Uwe Kleen	6
(Germany) Novel Racing	Lexus IS-F CCS-R	136	(Japan) Hiroyuki Kishimoto	8
(Germany) Novel Racing	Lexus IS-F CCS-R	136	(Japan) Kenichi Maejima	8
(Germany) Novel Racing	Lexus IS-F CCS-R	136	(Germany) Jürgen Bussmann	8
(Germany) Racing One	Ferrari 458 Italia Challenge	139	(Germany) Stephan Köhler	All
(Germany) Racing One	Ferrari 458 Italia Challenge	139	(Germany) Christian Kohlhaas	All
(Germany) Racing One	Ferrari 458 Italia Challenge	139	(Germany) Jürgen Bleul	1–4
(Germany) Racing One	Ferrari 458 Italia Challenge	139	(Switzerland) Nikolai Rogivue	5, 8–9
(Germany) Racing One	Ferrari 458 Italia Challenge	139	(Germany) Mike Jäger	5
	BMW M3 GTR	140	(Germany) Bernd Kleeschulte	4, 7
	BMW M3 GTR	140	(Germany) Florian Quante	4, 7
(Germany) RaceIng	Audi R8 LMS GT4	148	(Germany) Bernhard Henzel	1–3, 6
(Germany) RaceIng	Audi R8 LMS GT4	148	(Switzerland) Rahel Frey	1–3, 6

=== SP8T ===
Team	Car	#	Drivers	Events
(Germany) Black Falcon	Mercedes-AMG GT4	152	(Germany) Christoph Hoffmann	1–2
(Germany) Black Falcon	Mercedes-AMG GT4	152	(Germany) Axel König	1, 3
(Germany) Black Falcon	Mercedes-AMG GT4	152	(Germany) Norbert Schneider	1–2
(Germany) Black Falcon	Mercedes-AMG GT4	152	(Turkey) Mustafa Mehmet Kaya	2–4, 6–9
(Germany) Black Falcon	Mercedes-AMG GT4	152	(United States) "Ace Robey"	3, 5
(Germany) Black Falcon	Mercedes-AMG GT4	152	(Germany) Reinhold Renger	4
(Germany) Black Falcon	Mercedes-AMG GT4	152	(Germany) Tobias Wahl	5
(Germany) Black Falcon	Mercedes-AMG GT4	152	(Italy) Gabriele Piana	6, 8
(Germany) Black Falcon	Mercedes-AMG GT4	152	(Spain) Miguel Toril-Boquoi	6
(Germany) Black Falcon	Mercedes-AMG GT4	152	(Switzerland) Yannick Mettler	7
(Germany) Black Falcon	Mercedes-AMG GT4	152	(Germany) Stephan Rösler	8
(Germany) Black Falcon	Mercedes-AMG GT4	152	(Germany) Mike Stursberg	9
(Germany) Black Falcon	Mercedes-AMG GT4	152	(Germany) Nico Bastian	9
(Germany) Black Falcon	Mercedes-AMG GT4	155	(Turkey) Mustafa Mehmet Kaya	1–2, 5
(Germany) Black Falcon	Mercedes-AMG GT4	155	(Italy) Gabriele Piana	1, 5
(Germany) Black Falcon	Mercedes-AMG GT4	155	(United States) "Ace Robey"	1–2, 4
(Germany) Black Falcon	Mercedes-AMG GT4	155	(Estonia) Tristan Viidas	2
(Germany) Black Falcon	Mercedes-AMG GT4	155	(Germany) Stephan Rösler	3, 5
(Germany) Black Falcon	Mercedes-AMG GT4	155	(Switzerland) Yannick Mettler	3
(Germany) Black Falcon	Mercedes-AMG GT4	155	(Germany) Mike Stursberg	3
(Germany) Black Falcon	Mercedes-AMG GT4	155	(Luxembourg) Carlos Rivas	4
(Germany) Black Falcon	Mercedes-AMG GT4	155	(Germany) Tobias Wahl	4, 8–9
(Germany) Black Falcon	Mercedes-AMG GT4	155	(Germany) Reinhold Renger	5
(Germany) Black Falcon	Mercedes-AMG GT4	155	(Germany) Axel König	6–7, 9
(Germany) Black Falcon	Mercedes-AMG GT4	155	(Germany) Christoph Hoffmann	6–8
(Germany) Black Falcon	Mercedes-AMG GT4	155	(Germany) Norbert Schneider	6–7
(Germany) Black Falcon	Mercedes-AMG GT4	155	(Spain) Miguel Toril-Boquoi	8
(Germany) Black Falcon	Mercedes-AMG GT4	155	(Germany) Marek Böckmann	9
(Germany) Black Falcon	Mercedes-AMG GT4	770	(Germany) Dominik Clemm	6
(Germany) Black Falcon	Mercedes-AMG GT4	770	(Germany) Nicolas Clemm	6
(Germany) Black Falcon	Mercedes-AMG GT4	770	(United States) "Ace Robey"	6
(Germany) Team Speedline Racing	BMW M2	153	(Germany) Thomas Heuchemer	3, 6, 8–9
(Germany) Team Speedline Racing	BMW M2	153	(Germany) Christian Heuchemer	3, 6, 8–9
(Japan) Toyota Gazoo Racing	Toyota GR Supra GT4	154	(Japan) Yabuki Hisashi	2–3
(Japan) Toyota Gazoo Racing	Toyota GR Supra GT4	154	(Germany) Uwe Kleen	2
(Japan) Toyota Gazoo Racing	Toyota GR Supra GT4	154	(Belgium) Herwig Daenens	3
(United Kingdom) Aston Martin Racing	Aston Martin Vantage AMR GT4	156	(United Kingdom) Jamie Chadwick	3
(United Kingdom) Aston Martin Racing	Aston Martin Vantage AMR GT4	156	(United Kingdom) Peter Cate	3
(United Kingdom) Aston Martin Racing	Aston Martin Vantage AMR GT4	156	(Germany) Christian Gebhardt	3
(United Kingdom) Aston Martin Racing	Aston Martin Vantage AMR GT4	156	(United Kingdom) Martin Brundle	7
(United Kingdom) Aston Martin Racing	Aston Martin Vantage AMR GT4	156	(United Kingdom) Alex Brundle	7
(United Kingdom) Aston Martin Racing	Aston Martin Vantage AMR GT4	156	(Germany) Marco Müller	8
(United Kingdom) Aston Martin Racing	Aston Martin Vantage AMR GT4	156	(Netherlands) Marco van Ramshorst	8
(United Kingdom) Aston Martin Racing	Aston Martin Vantage AMR GT4	156	(Sweden) Alexander West	9
(United Kingdom) Aston Martin Racing	Aston Martin Vantage AMR GT4	156	(United Kingdom) Chris Goodwin	9
(United Kingdom) Aston Martin Racing	Aston Martin Vantage AMR GT4	158	(Germany) Marco Müller	5
(United Kingdom) Aston Martin Racing	Aston Martin Vantage AMR GT4	158	(United States) David Thilenius	5
(Germany) Schubert Motorsport	BMW M2	159	(Germany) Christopher Dreyspring	1–3, 6, 9
(Germany) Schubert Motorsport	BMW M2	159	(Germany) Christer Jöns	1–3, 6, 9
(Germany) Schubert Motorsport	BMW M2	159	(Netherlands) Ricardo van der Ende	6, 9
(Germany) BMW Motorsport	BMW M2	160	(Netherlands) Beitske Visser	5, 7
(Germany) BMW Motorsport	BMW M2	160	(Germany) Jörg Weidinger	5, 9
(Germany) BMW Motorsport	BMW M2	160	(Germany) Dirk Adorf	7
(Germany) BMW Motorsport	BMW M2	160	(Germany) Jens Klingmann	9
(Germany) Team AVIA Sorg Rennsport	BMW M4 GT4	771	(Germany) Stefan Beyer	6, 8
(Germany) Team AVIA Sorg Rennsport	BMW M4 GT4	771	(Germany) Emin Akata	6, 8
(Germany) Team AVIA Sorg Rennsport	BMW M4 GT4	771	(Austria) Torsten Kratz	6, 8
(Germany) Leutheuser Racing and Events	BMW M4 GT4	772	(Germany) Florian Wolf	6–9
(Germany) Leutheuser Racing and Events	BMW M4 GT4	772	(Switzerland) Manuel Amweg	6–9
(Germany) Leutheuser Racing and Events	BMW M4 GT4	772	(Germany) Arne Hoffmeister	6–7, 9
(Germany) Leutheuser Racing and Events	BMW M4 GT4	772	(Germany) Danny Brink	8
(Germany) Team Mathol Racing	Mercedes-AMG GT4	775	(Germany) Thomas Heinrich	6–8
(Germany) Team Mathol Racing	Mercedes-AMG GT4	775	(Germany) Scott Preacher	6–7
(Germany) Team Mathol Racing	Mercedes-AMG GT4	775	(Switzerland) Rüdiger Schicht	6
(Germany) Team Mathol Racing	Mercedes-AMG GT4	775	(Germany) 'Montana'	8

=== SP10 ===
Team	Car	#	Drivers	Events
(Germany) Pixum Team Adrenalin Motorsport	BMW M4 GT4	161	(Germany) Torsten Wolter	1–4, 6–9
(Germany) Pixum Team Adrenalin Motorsport	BMW M4 GT4	161	(Germany) Uwe Ebertz	1–3
(Germany) Pixum Team Adrenalin Motorsport	BMW M4 GT4	161	(Germany) Christopher Rink	1
(Germany) Pixum Team Adrenalin Motorsport	BMW M4 GT4	161	(Germany) Marcel Lenerz	4, 6–9
(Germany) Pixum Team Adrenalin Motorsport	BMW M4 GT4	161	(Denmark) Thomas Krebs	8
(Germany) Black Falcon	Mercedes-AMG GT4	162	(Germany) Tobias Müller	All
(Germany) Black Falcon	Mercedes-AMG GT4	162	(Germany) Tim Scheerbarth	All
(Germany) Black Falcon	Mercedes-AMG GT4	162	(Estonia) Tristan Viidas	All
(Germany) Black Falcon	Mercedes-AMG GT4	162	(Switzerland) Yannick Mettler	5
(Germany) Car Collection Motorsport	Audi R8 LMS GT4	170	(France) Guillaume Roman	3
(Germany) Car Collection Motorsport	Audi R8 LMS GT4	170	(France) Thierry Blaise	3
(Germany) Car Collection Motorsport	Audi R8 LMS GT4	170	(France) Olivier Baharian	3
(Germany) PROsport-Performance	Aston Martin Vantage AMR GT4	173	(Germany) Alexander Mies	9
(Germany) PROsport-Performance	Aston Martin Vantage AMR GT4	173	(Germany) Mike-David Ortmann	9
(Germany) Leutheuser Racing and Events	BMW M4 GT4	175	(Germany) Florian Wolf	2–3, 5
(Germany) Leutheuser Racing and Events	BMW M4 GT4	175	(Switzerland) Manuel Amweg	2–3, 5
(Germany) Leutheuser Racing and Events	BMW M4 GT4	175	(Germany) Arne Hoffmeister	2–3, 5
(Germany) Ring Racing	BMW M4 GT4	178	(Germany) Horst Baumann	1–2, 4–9
(Germany) Ring Racing	BMW M4 GT4	178	(Germany) Michael Tischner	1–2, 4–9
(Germany) Ring Racing	BMW M4 GT4	178	(Germany) Klaus Niesen	2, 7–9
(Germany) Ring Racing	BMW M4 GT4	178	(Germany) Uwe Kleen	5–6
(Germany) Team AVIA Sorg Rennsport	BMW M4 GT4	180	(Germany) Stefan Beyer	1–3, 5
(Germany) Team AVIA Sorg Rennsport	BMW M4 GT4	180	(Germany) Emin Akata	1–3, 5
(Germany) Team AVIA Sorg Rennsport	BMW M4 GT4	180	(Austria) Torsten Kratz	1–3, 5
(Germany) Team AVIA Sorg Rennsport	BMW M4 GT4	180	(Germany) Olaf Meyer	5
(Germany) Team AVIA Sorg Rennsport	BMW M4 GT4	181	(Germany) Heiko Eichenberg	All
(Germany) Team AVIA Sorg Rennsport	BMW M4 GT4	181	(Sweden) Erik Johansson	All
(Germany) Krämer Racing	Ginetta G55 GT4	188	(United States) Jean-François Brunot	2–3, 5, 7–8
(Germany) Krämer Racing	Ginetta G55 GT4	188	(Germany) Heiko Tönges	2–3, 5
(Germany) Krämer Racing	Ginetta G55 GT4	188	(Germany) Karsten Krämer	2–3, 7
(Germany) Krämer Racing	Ginetta G55 GT4	188	(Russia) Aleksey Veremenko	3
(Germany) Krämer Racing	Ginetta G55 GT4	188	(United Kingdom) Charles Ladell	5
(Germany) Krämer Racing	Ginetta G55 GT4	188	(United States) Andreas Gabler	8
(Germany) Krämer Racing	Ginetta G55 GT4	188	(Germany) Steffen Höber	8
(Germany) Team Mathol Racing e.V.	Mercedes-AMG GT4	190	(Germany) Scott Preacher	4
(Germany) Team Mathol Racing e.V.	Mercedes-AMG GT4	190	(Germany) Henning Cramer	4
(Germany) Walkenhorst Motorsport	BMW M4 GT4	191	(Germany) Florian Weber	1–3, 7, 9
(Germany) Walkenhorst Motorsport	BMW M4 GT4	191	(United Kingdom) Finlay Hutchison	1
(Germany) Walkenhorst Motorsport	BMW M4 GT4	191	(Germany) Alex Lambertz	1
(Germany) Walkenhorst Motorsport	BMW M4 GT4	191	(United Kingdom) Josh Caygill	2–3
(Germany) Walkenhorst Motorsport	BMW M4 GT4	191	(United Kingdom) Ewan McKay	3, 5
(Germany) Walkenhorst Motorsport	BMW M4 GT4	191	(United Kingdom) Ben Tuck	4–9
(Germany) Walkenhorst Motorsport	BMW M4 GT4	191	(Germany) Jörg Breuer	4, 6–8
(Germany) Walkenhorst Motorsport	BMW M4 GT4	191	(United Kingdom) Will Tregurtha	4–5
(Germany) Walkenhorst Motorsport	BMW M4 GT4	191	(Germany) Thomas Hetzer	5–6
(Germany) Walkenhorst Motorsport	BMW M4 GT4	191	(United Kingdom) Sebastian Melrose	8
(Germany) Walkenhorst Motorsport	BMW M4 GT4	191	(Germany) Henry Walkenhorst	9
(Switzerland) Hofor Racing	BMW M4 GT4	192	(Austria) Michael Fischer	8–9
(Switzerland) Hofor Racing	BMW M4 GT4	192	(Austria) Thomas Jäger	8–9
(Switzerland) Hofor Racing	BMW M4 GT4	192	(Germany) Michael Schrey	9
(Switzerland) Hofor Racing	BMW M4 GT4	192	(Germany) Marc Ehret	9
(Switzerland) Hofor Racing	BMW M4 GT4	193	(Germany) Michael Schrey	8–9
(Switzerland) Hofor Racing	BMW M4 GT4	193	(Germany) Marc Ehret	8
(Switzerland) Hofor Racing	BMW M4 GT4	193	(Austria) Michael Fischer	9
(Switzerland) Hofor Racing	BMW M4 GT4	193	(Austria) Thomas Jäger	9

=== SP6 ===
Team	Car	#	Drivers	Events
(Germany) Schmickler Performance	Porsche Cayman GT4	200	(Germany) Achim Wawer	8–9
(Germany) Schmickler Performance	Porsche Cayman GT4	200	(Germany) Markus Schmickler	8–9
(Germany) Schmickler Performance	Porsche Cayman GT4	200	(Germany) Volker Wawer	9
(Germany) Schmickler Performance	Porsche Cayman GT4	212	(Germany) Achim Wawer	1–7
(Germany) Schmickler Performance	Porsche Cayman GT4	212	(Germany) Markus Schmickler	1–7
(Germany) Schmickler Performance	Porsche Cayman GT4	212	(Germany) Stefan Schmickler	5
(Germany) rent2drive-FAMILIA-racing	Porsche 911 GT3 Cup	202	(Germany) "Der Bommel"	1–3, 6
(Germany) rent2drive-FAMILIA-racing	Porsche 911 GT3 Cup	202	(Germany) Dirk Vleugels	1, 3
(Germany) rent2drive-FAMILIA-racing	Porsche 911 GT3 Cup	202	(Germany) Jörg Wiskirchen	1
(Germany) rent2drive-FAMILIA-racing	Porsche 911 GT3 Cup	202	(Germany) Karl Pflanz	2–3, 6
(Germany) rent2drive-FAMILIA-racing	Porsche 911 GT3 Cup	202	(Germany) Richard Gresek	2
(Germany) rent2drive-FAMILIA-racing	Porsche 911 GT3 Cup	202	(Germany) Stefan Müller	6
(Germany) PROsport-Performance	Porsche Cayman GT4	205	(United States) Grant Maiman	4, 7–8
(Germany) PROsport-Performance	Porsche Cayman GT4	205	(United States) John Uglum	4, 7–8
(Germany) Stein Tveten Motorsport	Porsche 911 GT3 Cup	206	(Germany) Stein Tveten	6
(Germany) Stein Tveten Motorsport	Porsche 911 GT3 Cup	206	(Switzerland) Freidrich Obermeier	6
(Switzerland) Hofor Racing	BMW M3 E46	210	(Switzerland) Martin Kroll	1, 6–8
(Switzerland) Hofor Racing	BMW M3 E46	210	(Switzerland) Alexander Prinz	1, 6–8
(Switzerland) Hofor Racing	BMW M3 E46	210	(Switzerland) Michael Kroll	1, 6–7
(Switzerland) Hofor Racing	BMW M3 E46	210	(Switzerland) Roland Eggimann	1
(Switzerland) Hofor Racing	BMW M3 E46	210	(Germany) Bernd Küpper	7
(Switzerland) Hofor Racing	BMW M3 E46	210	(Netherlands) Christiaan Frankenhout	8
(Switzerland) Hofor Racing	BMW M3 E46	211	(Switzerland) Martin Kroll	1–3, 5–6
(Switzerland) Hofor Racing	BMW M3 E46	211	(Austria) Gustav Engljähringer	1–3
(Switzerland) Hofor Racing	BMW M3 E46	211	(Switzerland) Alexander Prinz	1–2, 5–6
(Switzerland) Hofor Racing	BMW M3 E46	211	(Switzerland) Michael Kroll	1, 5
(Switzerland) Hofor Racing	BMW M3 E46	211	(Switzerland) Roland Eggimann	5–6
(Germany) SetupWizard Racing	Porsche 911 GT3 Cup	215	(Germany) Michael Czyborra	3–9
(Germany) SetupWizard Racing	Porsche 911 GT3 Cup	215	(Germany) Mathias Hüttenrauch	3–7
(Germany) SetupWizard Racing	Porsche 911 GT3 Cup	215	(Germany) Hannes Plesse	3–6, 8
(Germany) SetupWizard Racing	Porsche 911 GT3 Cup	215	(Germany) Dominik Farnbacher	5
(Germany) SetupWizard Racing	Porsche 911 GT3 Cup	215	(Netherlands) Patrick Huisman	7–9

=== SP4 ===
Team	Car	#	Drivers	Events
	BMW 325i	249	(Germany) Jonas Spölgen	1–2, 4, 6–7
	BMW 325i	249	(Germany) Axel Wiegner	1–4, 6–7, 9
	BMW 325i	249	(Germany) Heinz Dolfen	3–4, 9
	BMW Z4	251	(Switzerland) Thomas Götschl	6
	BMW Z4	251	(Switzerland) Giorgio Maggi	6
	BMW 325i	252	(Germany) Nick Hancke	8–9
	BMW 325i	252	(Germany) Sascha Hancke	9
	BMW 325i	254	(Germany) Michael Mönch	8
	BMW 325i	254	(Germany) Christian Alexander Dannesberger	8
	BMW 325i	254	(Germany) Herrmann Kahrs	8

=== SP4T ===
Team	Car	#	Drivers	Events
	Porsche Cayman S	262	(Germany) Alexander Müller	5
	Porsche Cayman S	262	(Luxembourg) Jan Munhoven	5
	Porsche Cayman S	262	(Germany) Alexander Köppen	5
(Germany) MSC Sinzig	Volkswagen Golf	263	(Germany) Jens Wulf	2
(Germany) MSC Sinzig	Volkswagen Golf	263	(Germany) Achim Ewenz	2
(Germany) MSC Sinzig	Volkswagen Golf	263	(Germany) Michael Holz	2
(Germany) MSC Sinzig	Volkswagen Golf	263	(Argentina) Alejandro Chahwan	3
(Germany) MSC Sinzig	Volkswagen Golf	263	(Argentina) Frederico Braga	3
(Germany) MSC Münster e.V. DMV	Porsche Cayman S	266	(Germany) Peter Bonk	1–4, 9
(Germany) MSC Münster e.V. DMV	Porsche Cayman S	266	(Netherlands) Marco van Ramshorst	1–4, 9
(Germany) MSC Münster e.V. DMV	Porsche Cayman S	266	(Germany) Tim Neuser	9

=== H2 ===
Team	Car	#	Drivers	Events
(Germany) Automobilclub von Deutschland	Opel Manta (Flying Fox) GT	601	(Germany) Olaf Beckmann	1–3, 5–7, 9
(Germany) Automobilclub von Deutschland	Opel Manta (Flying Fox) GT	601	(Germany) Peter Hass	1–3, 5–7, 9
(Germany) Automobilclub von Deutschland	Opel Manta (Flying Fox) GT	601	(Germany) Volker Stryček	3, 5–7, 9
(Germany) MSC Adenau	Opel Calibra	602	(Germany) Tobias Jung	3
(Germany) MSC Adenau	Opel Calibra	602	(Germany) Christian Rziczny	3
(Germany) MSC Adenau	Opel Calibra	602	(France) François Wales	3
(Germany) MSC Adenau	Renault Clio	620	(Germany) Stephan Epp	1, 4–9
(Germany) MSC Adenau	Renault Clio	620	(Germany) Gerrit Holthaus	1, 4–9
(Germany) MSC Adenau	Renault Clio	620	(Germany) Michael Bohrer	1, 4–9
(Germany) MSC Adenau	Opel Calibra	621	(Germany) Tobias Jung	1–2
(Germany) MSC Adenau	Opel Calibra	621	(Germany) Christian Rziczny	1–2
(Germany) MSC Adenau	Opel Calibra	621	(France) François Wales	1–2
(Germany) Scuderia Colonia	Renault Clio	603	(Germany) Stephan Ernst	8
(Germany) Scuderia Colonia	Renault Clio	603	(Germany) Timo Beuth	8
	Volkswagen Golf	604	(Germany) Oliver Füllgrabe	9
	Honda Civic	605	(Germany) Vincent Schwartz	2–3
	Honda Civic	605	(Zimbabwe) Axcil Jefferies	2
	Honda Civic	605	(Germany) Peter Schwartz	TBA
(Germany) MSC Münster	Honda Civic	606	(Germany) Morris Kubatzki	4–5
(Germany) MSC Münster	Honda Civic	606	(Germany) Insa Jäschke	4–5
(Germany) MSC Münster	Honda Civic	606	(Germany) Florian Rass	4
	Renault Clio	607	(Germany) Frank Höhner	4, 7, 9
	Renault Clio	607	(Germany) Oliver Schumacher	4, 7, 9
	Renault Clio	608	(Germany) Katja Thomas	4
	Renault Clio	608	(Germany) Reiner Thomas	4
	Renault Clio	608	(Germany) Manfred Schmitz	4
(Germany) FUNmotorsport	BMW E36	609	(Germany) Günther Hartwig	4, 6–7
(Germany) FUNmotorsport	BMW E36	609	(Germany) Frank Unverhau	6
(Germany) FUNmotorsport	BMW E36	609	(Germany) Wolfgang Kaufmann	7
(Germany) MSC Sinzig	Renault Clio	610	(Germany) Rolf Weißenfels	1, 4
(Germany) MSC Sinzig	Renault Clio	610	(Germany) Volker Garrn	1
(Germany) MSC Sinzig	Renault Clio	610	(Germany) Achim Ewenz	4
(Germany) MSC Sinzig	Volkswagen Golf	615	(Germany) Volker Garrn	2–3
(Germany) MSC Sinzig	Volkswagen Golf	615	(France) Tommy Fortchantre	2–3
(Germany) MSC Sinzig	Volkswagen Golf	615	(Germany) Raphael Klingmann	3
(Germany) MSC Sinzig	Renault Clio	619	(Germany) Achim Ewenz	9
(Germany) MSC Sinzig	Renault Clio	619	(France) Tommy Fortchantre	9
(Germany) MSC Sinzig	Renault Clio	619	(Germany) Stefan Endres	9
(Germany) MSC Sinzig	Volkswagen Golf	623	(Germany) Stefan Endres	4–5
(Germany) MSC Sinzig	Volkswagen Golf	623	(France) Tommy Fortchantre	4
(Germany) MSC Sinzig	Volkswagen Golf	623	(Germany) Ralph Liesenfeld	5
(Germany) MSC Sinzig	Volkswagen Golf	623	(Germany) Sönke Brederlow	5
(Germany) MSC Sinzig	Volkswagen Golf	628	(Germany) Ralph Liesenfeld	9
(Germany) MSC Sinzig	Volkswagen Golf	628	(Germany) Marvin Heinzelmann	9
(Germany) MSC Sinzig	Volkswagen Golf	628	(Germany) Danny Lehner	9
	Honda Civic	611	(Germany) Frank Kuhlmann	4, 6–9
	Honda Civic	611	(Germany) Mark Giesbrecht	4, 6–9
	Honda Civic	611	(Germany) Timo Drößiger	4, 6–9
(Belgium) Nationale Autoclub Excelsior	BMW 318i	612	(Belgium) Ludo Stessens	1
(Belgium) Nationale Autoclub Excelsior	BMW 318i	612	(Belgium) Marc Stessens	1
(Belgium) Nationale Autoclub Excelsior	BMW 318i	612	(Belgium) Ken Stessens	1
(Belgium) Nationale Autoclub Excelsior	BMW 318i	612	(Belgium) Toon Ëckelärt	1
	Audi A3	613	(Switzerland) Marc Roth	4–5
	Audi A3	613	(Switzerland) Edy Kamm	4–5
	Audi A3	613	(Switzerland) Daniel Nyffeler	4–5
	Renault Clio	614	(Germany) Tobias Overbeck	All
	Renault Clio	614	(Germany) Daniel Overbeck	All
	Renault Clio	616	(Germany) Thomas Overbeck	2–3
	Renault Clio	616	(Germany) Michael Lindmayer	2–3
	Renault Clio	616	(Germany) Daniel Overbeck	2–3
	Renault Clio	617	(Germany) Robert Lommel	4, 6
	Renault Clio	617	(Germany) Markus Leger	6
	Volkswagen Corrado	618	(Germany) Jürgen Freiburg	4, 6–7
	Volkswagen Corrado	618	(Germany) Frank Haack	4
	BMW 318i	622	(Germany) Romeo Löwe	1–3
	BMW 318i	622	(Germany) Anna Löwe	1–3
	Renault Clio	624	(Germany) Holger Gödicke	8
	Renault Clio	624	(Germany) Nick Wüstenhagen	8
(Germany) RCK Team Hannover	Volkswagen Jetta	625	(Germany) Stefan Lohn	1, 7
(Germany) RCK Team Hannover	Volkswagen Jetta	625	(Germany) Phillip Eis	1, 7
(Germany) RCK Team Hannover	Volkswagen Jetta	625	(Germany) Norbert Mehling	1
(Germany) RCK Team Hannover	Volkswagen Jetta	625	(Germany) Thomas Ehrhardt	7
	BMW M3	626	(Germany) Konstantin Wolf	All
	BMW M3	626	(Germany) Christian Hirsch	1–5, 7–9
	BMW M3	626	(Germany) Markus Schaufess	5
	Renault Clio	630	(Germany) Marc Wylach	All
	Renault Clio	630	(Germany) Michael Ülwer	1–6, 9
	Renault Clio	630	(Germany) Björn Katthage	1, 6, 9
	Renault Clio	630	(Germany) Volker Kühn	2–5, 7–8
	Renault Clio	630	(Germany) Stephan Epp	8
	Renault Clio	631	(Germany) Marcel Unland	1–8
	Renault Clio	631	(Germany) Christoph Schmitz	1–8

=== V4 ===
Team	Car	#	Drivers	Events
(Germany) Pixum Team Adrenalin Motorsport	BMW 325i E90	1	(Germany) Phillipp Leisen	All
(Germany) Pixum Team Adrenalin Motorsport	BMW 325i E90	1	(Germany) Daniel Brink	All
(Germany) Pixum Team Adrenalin Motorsport	BMW 325i E90	1	(Germany) Christopher Rink	All
(Germany) Pixum Team Adrenalin Motorsport	BMW 325i E90	702	(Germany) Christoph Magg	1–6
(Germany) Pixum Team Adrenalin Motorsport	BMW 325i E90	702	(Germany) Philipp Stahlschmidt	1–6
(Germany) Pixum Team Adrenalin Motorsport	BMW 325i E90	702	(Germany) Philipp Kowalski	1–6
(Germany) Pixum Team Adrenalin Motorsport	BMW 325i E90	702	(Finland) Ilmari Korpivaara	7
(Germany) Pixum Team Adrenalin Motorsport	BMW 325i E90	702	(Germany) Andreas Winkler	7
(Germany) Pixum Team Adrenalin Motorsport	BMW 325i E90	702	(South Korea) Kichul Song	9
(Germany) Pixum Team Adrenalin Motorsport	BMW 325i E90	702	(South Korea) Jeong Min An	9
(Germany) Pixum Team Adrenalin Motorsport	BMW 325i E90	703	(United States) Jason-Michael Wolfe	2–3
(Germany) Pixum Team Adrenalin Motorsport	BMW 325i E90	703	(Luxembourg) Bob Wilwert	3
(Germany) Pixum Team Adrenalin Motorsport	BMW 325i E90	703	(Germany) Christian Rosen	5
(Germany) Pixum Team Adrenalin Motorsport	BMW 325i E90	703	(Norway) Håvard Kollen	5
(Germany) Pixum Team Adrenalin Motorsport	BMW 325i E90	703	(Germany) Daniel Reuter	5
(Germany) Pixum Team Adrenalin Motorsport	BMW 325i E90	703	(Finland) Ilmari Korpivaara	5
(Germany) Pixum Team Adrenalin Motorsport	BMW 325i E90	703	(Germany) Christoph Magg	7–9
(Germany) Pixum Team Adrenalin Motorsport	BMW 325i E90	703	(Germany) Philipp Stahlschmidt	7–9
(Germany) Pixum Team Adrenalin Motorsport	BMW 325i E90	703	(Germany) Philipp Kowalski	7–9
(Germany) Frikadelli Racing Team	BMW 325i E90	477	(Germany) Beat Schmitz	All
(Germany) Frikadelli Racing Team	BMW 325i E90	477	(Germany) Andre Sommerberg	All
(Germany) Frikadelli Racing Team	BMW 325i E90	477	(Germany) Sabine Schmitz	5, 8–9
(Germany) Frikadelli Racing Team	BMW 325i E90	701	(Germany) Jürgen Huber	2–3, 7–9
(Germany) Frikadelli Racing Team	BMW 325i E90	701	(Germany) Simon Sagmeister	2–3, 7–9
(Germany) Frikadelli Racing Team	BMW 325i E90	701	(Germany) Cyril Kalbaßi	2–3, 7–9
(Germany) Frikadelli Racing Team	BMW 325i E90	704	(Germany) Jürgen Huber	1, 5
(Germany) Frikadelli Racing Team	BMW 325i E90	704	(Germany) Simon Sagmeister	1, 5
(Germany) Frikadelli Racing Team	BMW 325i E90	704	(Germany) Cyril Kalbaßi	5
(Germany) Team AVIA Sorg Rennsport	BMW 325i E90	705	(Turkey) Emir Asari	1–3, 6, 8
(Germany) Team AVIA Sorg Rennsport	BMW 325i E90	705	(Turkey) Ersin Yücesan	1–3
(Germany) Team AVIA Sorg Rennsport	BMW 325i E90	705	(United States) Shane Lewis	1
(Germany) Team AVIA Sorg Rennsport	BMW 325i E90	705	(Switzerland) Roland Schmid	2–3
(Germany) Team AVIA Sorg Rennsport	BMW 325i E90	705	(Germany) Björn Simon	6, 8
(Germany) Team AVIA Sorg Rennsport	BMW 325i E90	705	(Switzerland) "Stefan Meier"	6
(Germany) Team AVIA Sorg Rennsport	BMW 325i E90	705	(Austria) Torsten Kratz	7
(Germany) Team AVIA Sorg Rennsport	BMW 325i E90	705	(Germany) Oliver Frisse	7
(Germany) Team AVIA Sorg Rennsport	BMW 325i E90	705	(United Kingdom) Moran Gott	7
(Germany) Team AVIA Sorg Rennsport	BMW 325i E90	705	(United Kingdom) Nicolas Griebner	8
(Germany) Team AVIA Sorg Rennsport	BMW 325i E90	705	(United Kingdom) Jack Mitchell	9
(Germany) Team AVIA Sorg Rennsport	BMW 325i E90	705	(United States) Alec Udell	9
(Germany) Team AVIA Sorg Rennsport	BMW 325i E90	706	(Austria) Torsten Kratz	1–6, 8–9
(Germany) Team AVIA Sorg Rennsport	BMW 325i E90	706	(Germany) Oliver Friße	1–6, 8–9
(Germany) Team AVIA Sorg Rennsport	BMW 325i E90	706	(United Kingdom) Moran Gott	1–6, 8–9
(Germany) Team AVIA Sorg Rennsport	BMW 325i E90	706	(Turkey) Emir Asari	7
(Germany) Team AVIA Sorg Rennsport	BMW 325i E90	706	(Germany) Björn Simon	7
(Germany) Team AVIA Sorg Rennsport	BMW 325i E90	727	(Turkey) Emir Asari	4–5
(Germany) Team AVIA Sorg Rennsport	BMW 325i E90	727	(Turkey) Ersin Yücesan	4
(Germany) Team AVIA Sorg Rennsport	BMW 325i E90	727	(Germany) Björn Simon	5
(Germany) Team AVIA Sorg Rennsport	BMW 325i E90	727	(United States) Shane Lewis	5
(Germany) Team AVIA Sorg Rennsport	BMW 325i E90	727	(France) Steven Palette	5
(Germany) Team AVIA Sorg Rennsport	BMW 325i E90	707	(Germany) Florian Quante	1–3, 6, 8–9
(Germany) Team AVIA Sorg Rennsport	BMW 325i E90	707	(Liechtenstein) Matthias Kaiser	1–3, 6
(Germany) Team AVIA Sorg Rennsport	BMW 325i E90	707	(Switzerland) "Stefan Meier"	1–2
(Germany) Team AVIA Sorg Rennsport	BMW 325i E90	707	(Germany) Christian Bock	6
(Germany) Team AVIA Sorg Rennsport	BMW 325i E90	707	(Germany) Stephan Köpple	8–9
(Germany) Team AVIA Sorg Rennsport	BMW 325i E90	707	(Germany) Jerome Larbi	8–9
	BMW 325i E90	708	(Finland) Patrick Mäkelin	1–2
	BMW 325i E90	708	(Germany) Christian Linnek	1, 4
	BMW 325i E90	708	(Germany) Mike Halder	2
	BMW 325i E90	708	(Germany) Michelle Halder	2
	BMW 325i E90	708	(Finland) Marco Haverinen	4
(Germany) Stein Tveten Motorsport	BMW 325i E90	709	(Italy) Daniel Fink	4, 6, 8–9
(Germany) Stein Tveten Motorsport	BMW 325i E90	709	(Austria) David Lanthaler	4, 6, 8
(Germany) Stein Tveten Motorsport	BMW 325i E90	709	(Switzerland) Johannes Weger	6, 8
(Germany) Stein Tveten Motorsport	BMW 325i E90	709	(Italy) Florian Haller	9
(Germany) Scuderia Solagon	BMW 325i E90	710	(Germany) Franco Arcidiacone	1–3
(Germany) Scuderia Solagon	BMW 325i E90	710	(Germany) Paul Martin Dose	1
(Germany) Scuderia Solagon	BMW 325i E90	710	(Germany) Carsten Meurer	2–3, 6, 8
(Germany) Scuderia Solagon	BMW 325i E90	710	(Germany) Daniel Niermann	2–3
(Germany) Scuderia Solagon	BMW 325i E90	710	(Russia) Andrey Sidorenko	6
(Germany) Scuderia Solagon	BMW 325i E90	710	(Switzerland) Hugo de Sadeleer	7
(Germany) Scuderia Solagon	BMW 325i E90	710	(Croatia) Martin Kodrić	7
(Germany) Scuderia Solagon	BMW 325i E90	710	(Germany) Kevin Totz	8
(Germany) Scuderia Solagon	BMW 325i E90	710	(Germany) Christopher Rink	8
(Germany) Scuderia Solagon	BMW 325i E90	710	(Sweden) Jimmy Eriksson	9
(Germany) Scuderia Solagon	BMW 325i E90	710	(Germany) Michelle Halder	9
(Germany) Scuderia Solagon	BMW 325i E90	710	(Germany) Uwe Mallwitz	9
(Germany) Scuderia Solagon	BMW 325i E90	711	(Germany) Kevin Totz	1–7, 9
(Germany) Scuderia Solagon	BMW 325i E90	711	(Germany) Cedrik Totz	1–7, 9
(Germany) Scuderia Solagon	BMW 325i E90	711	(Germany) Christian-Andreas Franz	1–7, 9
(Germany) Scuderia Solagon	BMW 325i E90	712	(Germany) Daniel Jolk	1–5, 7–8
(Germany) Scuderia Solagon	BMW 325i E90	712	(Germany) Daniel Niermann	1–3
(Germany) Scuderia Solagon	BMW 325i E90	712	(Germany) Klaus Niermann	1
(Germany) Scuderia Solagon	BMW 325i E90	712	(Germany) Carsten Meurer	2, 4, 7
(Germany) Scuderia Solagon	BMW 325i E90	712	(Germany) Loris Prattes	3
(Germany) Scuderia Solagon	BMW 325i E90	712	(Sweden) Jimmy Eriksson	5–6
(Germany) Scuderia Solagon	BMW 325i E90	712	(Mexico) Eric Gallardo	5
(Germany) Scuderia Solagon	BMW 325i E90	712	(Mexico) Juan Carlos Carmona Chavez	5
(Germany) Scuderia Solagon	BMW 325i E90	712	(Germany) Christian Titze	6
(Germany) Scuderia Solagon	BMW 325i E90	712	(Germany) Sarah Ganser	6
(Germany) Scuderia Solagon	BMW 325i E90	712	(Russia) Andrey Sidorenko	8
(Germany) Scuderia Solagon	BMW 325i E90	712	(Germany) Martin Jargon	8
(Germany) Scuderia Solagon	BMW 325i E90	712	(Germany) Marcel Fugel	9
(Germany) Scuderia Solagon	BMW 325i E90	712	(Germany) Michelle Halder	9
(Germany) Scuderia Solagon	BMW 325i E90	712	(Germany) Mike Halder	9
(Germany) Dürener Motorsportclub	BMW 325i E90	714	(Germany) Sascha Hancke	2–3
(Germany) Dürener Motorsportclub	BMW 325i E90	714	(Germany) Thomas Schöffner	2–3
(Germany) Dürener Motorsportclub	BMW 325i E90	714	(Germany) Thomas Asmussen	4, 8
(Germany) Dürener Motorsportclub	BMW 325i E90	714	(Germany) Ben Seifert	4, 8
(Germany) Dürener Motorsportclub	BMW 325i E90	714	(Germany) Sarah Ganser	4, 8
(Germany) MC Roetgen	BMW 325i E90	717	(Germany) Sascha Korte	4, 6, 9
(Germany) MC Roetgen	BMW 325i E90	717	(Netherlands) Chris Rothoff	4, 6, 9
(Germany) MC Roetgen	BMW 325i E90	717	(Germany) Eric Petrich	4, 6, 9
(Germany) MC Roetgen	BMW 325i E90	718	(United Kingdom) Benjamin Lyons	4, 6, 9
(Germany) MC Roetgen	BMW 325i E90	718	(Germany) Markus Löw	4, 6, 9
	BMW 325i E90	720	(Germany) Ingo Öpen	2, 5
	BMW 325i E90	720	(Germany) Sven Hoffmann	2, 6
	BMW 325i E90	720	(Germany) Torsten Köppert	5–6
(Belgium) Pieter Denys Racing	BMW 325i E90	721	(Belgium) Pieter Denys	1, 3–9
(Belgium) Pieter Denys Racing	BMW 325i E90	721	(Belgium) Gregory Eyckmans	1, 3–9
	BMW 325i E90	722	(Germany) Uwe Mallwitz	2–6, 8–9
	BMW 325i E90	722	(Germany) Patrick Steuer	2–4, 8
	BMW 325i E90	722	(Germany) Henning Deuster	5–6, 8–9
	BMW 325i E90	722	(Germany) Stephan Köpple	5
	BMW 325i E90	722	(Germany) Jerome Larbi	5
	BMW 325i E90	722	(Germany) Christian Rosen	6
	BMW 325i E90	722	(Germany) Christian-Alexander Dannesberger	9
(Germany) MSC Wahlscheid	BMW 325i E90	730	(Switzerland) Juha Miettinen	All
(Germany) MSC Wahlscheid	BMW 325i E90	730	(Sweden) Dan Berghult	All
(Germany) MSC Wahlscheid	BMW 325i E90	730	(United States) Andrew Engelmann	7, 9
	BMW 325i E90	731	(Switzerland) Thomas Götschl	9
	BMW 325i E90	731	(Switzerland) Giorgio Maggi	9
	BMW 325i E90	732	(Germany) Christian Linnek	5
	BMW 325i E90	732	(Finland) Marco Haverinen	5
	BMW 325i E90	732	(Finland) Jutta Haverinen	5
	BMW 325i E90	732	(Israel) Ran Kiselstein	8
	BMW 325i E90	732	(Israel) Dean Apfel	8
	BMW 325i E90	732	(Germany) Andreas Schmitt	8
	BMW 325i E90	732	(United Kingdom) Moran Gott	8
	BMW 325i E90	733	(Germany) Maik Kraske	All
	BMW 325i E90	733	(Germany) Andreas Roloff	1–2, 4–9
	BMW 325i E90	733	(Germany) Elmar Jurek	3
(Switzerland) Hofor-Racing	BMW 325i E90	734	(Germany) Sven Öpen	4–5, 7–9
(Switzerland) Hofor-Racing	BMW 325i E90	734	(Germany) Manuel Dormagen	4–5, 7–9
(Switzerland) Hofor-Racing	BMW 325i E90	745	(Germany) Rolf Derscheid	1–8
(Switzerland) Hofor-Racing	BMW 325i E90	745	(Germany) Michael Flehmer	1–8
(Switzerland) Hofor-Racing	BMW 325i E90	745	(Germany) Zoran Radulović	1–5
(Germany) Lubner Motorsport	BMW 325i E90	735	(Finland) "Sepo Hunt"	4
(Germany) Lubner Motorsport	BMW 325i E90	735	(Germany) Philipp Regensperger	4, 6
(Germany) Lubner Motorsport	BMW 325i E90	735	(Germany) Mike Halder	6
(Germany) Lubner Motorsport	BMW 325i E90	735	(Germany) Michelle Halder	6
(Germany) Lubner Motorsport	BMW 325i E90	736	(Germany) Franz Engstler	1
(Germany) Lubner Motorsport	BMW 325i E90	736	(Germany) Luca Engstler	1
(Germany) Lubner Motorsport	BMW 325i E90	737	(Germany) Mike Halder	1–2
(Germany) Lubner Motorsport	BMW 325i E90	737	(Germany) Michael Brüggenkamp	1
(Germany) Lubner Motorsport	BMW 325i E90	737	(Germany) Michelle Halder	2
(Germany) rent2drive-FAMILIA-racing	BMW 325i E90	738	(Russia) Sergey Gorbunov	2, 4, 6
(Germany) rent2drive-FAMILIA-racing	BMW 325i E90	738	(Russia) Andrey Sidorenko	2–3, 7
(Germany) rent2drive-FAMILIA-racing	BMW 325i E90	738	(Germany) Franz Engstler	2–3
(Germany) rent2drive-FAMILIA-racing	BMW 325i E90	738	(Germany) David Ackermann	3
(Germany) rent2drive-FAMILIA-racing	BMW 325i E90	738	(Germany) Philip Ade	4, 7
(Germany) rent2drive-FAMILIA-racing	BMW 325i E90	738	(Germany) Philipp Gresek	4
(Germany) rent2drive-FAMILIA-racing	BMW 325i E90	738	(Turkey) Ersin Yücesan	5–6
(Germany) rent2drive-FAMILIA-racing	BMW 325i E90	738	(Germany) Michael Küchenmeister	5
(Germany) rent2drive-FAMILIA-racing	BMW 325i E90	738	(Germany) Julian Koch	5
(Germany) rent2drive-FAMILIA-racing	BMW 325i E90	738	(Germany) Kevin Warum	5
(Germany) rent2drive-FAMILIA-racing	BMW 325i E90	738	(Turkey) Kadir Akça	6
(Germany) rent2drive-FAMILIA-racing	BMW 325i E90	738	(Italy) Daniele Barge	7
(Germany) rent2drive-FAMILIA-racing	BMW 325i E90	747	(Germany) Richard Gresek	All
(Germany) rent2drive-FAMILIA-racing	BMW 325i E90	747	(Germany) Moritz Gusenbauer	All
(Germany) rent2drive-FAMILIA-racing	BMW 325i E90	747	(Germany) Philipp Gresek	1–4, 6–9
(Germany) rent2drive-FAMILIA-racing	BMW 325i E90	748	(Germany) Christian Scherer	All
(Germany) rent2drive-FAMILIA-racing	BMW 325i E90	748	(Germany) Andreas Schmidt	All
	BMW 325i E90	739	(Germany) Nora Göltenbodt	8
	BMW 325i E90	740	(Germany) Dominik Schöning	6–9
	BMW 325i E90	740	(Germany) Roman Schiemenz	6–9
	BMW 325i E90	741	(Germany) Herrmann Kahrs	9
	BMW 325i E90	741	(Germany) Uwe Stockhausen	9
(Germany) MSC Adenau	BMW 325i E90	744	(Germany) Marc Roitzheim	1–7, 9
(Germany) MSC Adenau	BMW 325i E90	744	(Germany) John-Lee Schambony	1–7
(Germany) MSC Adenau	BMW 325i E90	744	(Switzerland) Guido Wirtz	1–5
(Germany) MSC Adenau	BMW 325i E90	744	(Germany) Paul Neumayer	9
(Germany) Manheller Racing	BMW 325i E90	750	(Germany) Marco Zabel	2, 9
(Germany) Manheller Racing	BMW 325i E90	750	(Austria) Markus Fischer	2
(Germany) Manheller Racing	BMW 325i E90	750	(United States) David Quinlan	2
(Germany) Manheller Racing	BMW 325i E90	750	(Austria) Simon Reicher	8–9
(Germany) Manheller Racing	BMW 325i E90	750	(Argentina) Esteban Guerrieri	8
(Germany) Manheller Racing	BMW 325i E90	750	(Argentina) Néstor Girolami	8
(Germany) Jaco's Paddock Motorsport	BMW 325i E90	751	(Germany) Dago Diedrich	2
(Germany) Jaco's Paddock Motorsport	BMW 325i E90	751	(United Kingdom) Jack Mitchell	2
(Germany) Jaco's Paddock Motorsport	BMW 325i E90	751	(Germany) Andrew Engelmann	3
(Germany) Jaco's Paddock Motorsport	BMW 325i E90	751	(United States) Robert Stretch	3
(Germany) Jaco's Paddock Motorsport	BMW 325i E90	751	(Luxembourg) Graham Wilson	8–9
(Germany) Jaco's Paddock Motorsport	BMW 325i E90	751	(United Kingdom) Andrew Wolfe	8–9
(Germany) Jaco's Paddock Motorsport	BMW 325i E90	752	(Germany) Dago Diedrich	5
(Germany) Jaco's Paddock Motorsport	BMW 325i E90	752	(Liechtenstein) Fabienne Wohlwend	5
(Germany) Jaco's Paddock Motorsport	BMW 325i E90	753	(France) Jim Pla	3, 5
(Germany) Jaco's Paddock Motorsport	BMW 325i E90	753	(France) Thomas Drouet	3, 5
(Germany) Jaco's Paddock Motorsport	BMW 325i E90	753	(France) Thomas Neubauer	5
(Germany) Jaco's Paddock Motorsport	BMW 325i E90	753	(Germany) Dago Diedrich	6
(Germany) Jaco's Paddock Motorsport	BMW 325i E90	753	(Germany) Fred Wißkirchen	6
(Germany) Jaco's Paddock Motorsport	BMW 325i E90	753	(Liechtenstein) Fabienne Wohlwend	8
(Germany) Jaco's Paddock Motorsport	BMW 325i E90	753	(Japan) Takashi Ito	8
(Germany) Jaco's Paddock Motorsport	BMW 325i E90	754	(South Korea) Seung-Bae Son	9
(Germany) Jaco's Paddock Motorsport	BMW 325i E90	754	(South Korea) Yoong-Yeon Ahn	9
	BMW 325i E90	755	(Germany) Fabian Pirrone	5–9
	BMW 325i E90	755	(Germany) Matthias Möller	5–8
	BMW 325i E90	755	(Germany) Dominic Destrée	5, 9
(Germany) Krämer Racing	BMW 325i E90	757	(Germany) Sascha Kloft	1–3, 5, 8
(Germany) Krämer Racing	BMW 325i E90	757	(United Kingdom) Charlie Robertson	1–3
(Germany) Krämer Racing	BMW 325i E90	757	(United Kingdom) Jac Constable	1–2
(Germany) Krämer Racing	BMW 325i E90	757	(United Kingdom) Will Tregurtha	3
(Germany) Krämer Racing	BMW 325i E90	757	(Germany) Danny Lehner	5–6, 8
(Germany) Krämer Racing	BMW 325i E90	757	(Germany) Marvin Heinzelmann	5–6, 8
(Germany) Krämer Racing	BMW 325i E90	757	(Germany) Jan-Boris Schmäing	6
	BMW 325i E90	760	(Germany) Serge van Vooren	4, 6, 8–9
	BMW 325i E90	760	(Turkey) Caglayan Celik	4
	BMW 325i E90	760	(Turkey) Kadir Akça	4
	BMW 325i E90	760	(Germany) Christian Schotte	6–8
	BMW 325i E90	760	(Germany) Hans Winkler	6, 8–9
	BMW 325i E90	760	(Germany) Christian Bock	7
	BMW 325i E90	760	(Germany) Zichao Wang	9

=== TCR ===
Team	Car	No.	Drivers	Events
(Germany) Max Kruse Racing	Volkswagen Golf TCR	10	(Germany) Andreas Gülden	1–7
(Germany) Max Kruse Racing	Volkswagen Golf TCR	10	(Germany) Benjamin Leuchter	1–2, 4–7
(Germany) Max Kruse Racing	Volkswagen Golf TCR	819	(Switzerland) Jasmin Preisig	4–9
(Germany) Max Kruse Racing	Volkswagen Golf TCR	819	(Germany) Loris Prattes	4–7
(Germany) Max Kruse Racing	Volkswagen Golf TCR	819	(Germany) Benjamin Leuchter	7–8
(Germany) Max Kruse Racing	Volkswagen Golf TCR	819	(Germany) Andreas Gülden	8–9
(Norway) Møller Bil Motorsport	Audi RS 3 LMS TCR	801	(Norway) Håkon Schjærin	3, 5–9
(Norway) Møller Bil Motorsport	Audi RS 3 LMS TCR	801	(Norway) Kenneth Østvold	3, 5–9
(Norway) Møller Bil Motorsport	Audi RS 3 LMS TCR	801	(Norway) Atle Gulbrandsen	3, 5–6, 9
(Norway) Møller Bil Motorsport	Audi RS 3 LMS TCR	801	(Norway) Anders Lindstad	5, 7–8
(Germany) Mathilda Racing	SEAT León TCR	804	(Germany) Karl Brinker	7
(Germany) Mathilda Racing	SEAT León TCR	804	(Germany) Timo Hochwind	7
(Germany) Mathilda Racing	SEAT León TCR	806	(Germany) Matthias Wasel	All
(Germany) Mathilda Racing	SEAT León TCR	806	(Switzerland) Frederic Yerly	All
(Germany) Mathilda Racing	SEAT León TCR	806	(Germany) Heiko Hammel	2–3
(Germany) Mathilda Racing	SEAT León TCR	806	(Switzerland) Roland Schmid	5, 7–8
(Germany) Mathilda Racing	SEAT León TCR	806	(Switzerland) Mathias Schläppi	9
(Germany) FEV Racing	SEAT León TCR	820	(Germany) Lukas Thiele	1–3
(Germany) FEV Racing	SEAT León TCR	820	(Germany) Martin Pischinger	1
(Germany) FEV Racing	SEAT León TCR	820	(Germany) Benedikt Gentgen	2–3
(Germany) FEV Racing	SEAT León TCR	820	(Germany) André Gies	3
(Germany) Lubner Motorsport	Opel Astra TCR	822	(Switzerland) Roger Vögeli	4, 6
(Germany) Lubner Motorsport	Opel Astra TCR	822	(Finland) Ilkka Kariste	4, 6
(Germany) Lubner Motorsport	Opel Astra TCR	822	(Russia) Andrei Sidorenko	4
(Germany) Team AVIA Sorg Rennsport	Audi RS 3 LMS TCR	828	(Switzerland) Peter Haener	2
(Germany) Team AVIA Sorg Rennsport	Audi RS 3 LMS TCR	828	(United Arab Emirates) Mohammed Al Owais	2
(Germany) Team AVIA Sorg Rennsport	Audi RS 3 LMS TCR	828	(United Arab Emirates) Nadir Zuhour	2
(South Korea) Hyundai Motorsport N	Hyundai i30 TCR	830	(Germany) Peter Terting	1–2
(South Korea) Hyundai Motorsport N	Hyundai i30 TCR	830	(Austria) Harald Proczyk	1–2
(South Korea) Hyundai Motorsport N	Hyundai Veloster TCR	833	(Germany) Manuel Lauck	1
(South Korea) Hyundai Motorsport N	Hyundai Veloster TCR	833	(Germany) Marc Basseng	1
(South Korea) Hyundai Motorsport N	Hyundai Veloster TCR	833	(Belgium) Nico Verdonck	2
(South Korea) Hyundai Motorsport N	Hyundai Veloster TCR	833	(Germany) Moritz Oestreich	2
(Germany) Autohaus Markus Fugel	Honda Civic TCR	835	(Portugal) Tiago Monteiro	1–2
(Germany) Autohaus Markus Fugel	Honda Civic TCR	835	(Germany) Markus Oestreich	1–2
(Germany) Autohaus Markus Fugel	Honda Civic TCR	835	(Germany) Dominik Fugel	1–2
(Switzerland) Garage Rothenberger	SEAT León TCR	838	(Switzerland) Sandro Rothenberger	1–3
(Switzerland) Garage Rothenberger	SEAT León TCR	838	(Germany) Karl Brinker	1–3

=== Other classes ===
SP5
Team	Car	No.	Drivers	Rounds
(Germany) Leutheuser Racing&Events	BMW 1M-Coupe	222	(Germany) Harald Rettich	3, 5
(Germany) Leutheuser Racing&Events	BMW 1M-Coupe	222	(France) Fabrice Reicher	3
(Germany) Leutheuser Racing&Events	BMW 1M-Coupe	222	(Austria) Richard Putscher	3
(Germany) Leutheuser Racing&Events	BMW 1M-Coupe	222	(Germany) Uwe Legermann	5
(Germany) Leutheuser Racing&Events	BMW 1M-Coupe	222	(Germany) Tim Breidenbach	5
SP3
Team	Car	No.	Drivers	Rounds
(Germany) Pit Lane - AMC Sankt Vith	Toyota GT86 Cup	269	(Belgium) Kurt Dujardyn	2–4, 6–8
(Germany) Pit Lane - AMC Sankt Vith	Toyota GT86 Cup	269	(Switzerland) Jacques Castelein	2, 4, 7–8
(Germany) Pit Lane - AMC Sankt Vith	Toyota GT86 Cup	269	(Belgium) Marc Duez	2
(Germany) Pit Lane - AMC Sankt Vith	Toyota GT86 Cup	269	(Belgium) Olivier Muytjens	3, 6
(Germany) Pit Lane - AMC Sankt Vith	Toyota GT86 Cup	270	(Belgium) "Brody"	All
(Germany) Pit Lane - AMC Sankt Vith	Toyota GT86 Cup	270	(Belgium) Jacques Derenne	All
(Germany) Pit Lane - AMC Sankt Vith	Toyota GT86 Cup	270	(Belgium) Olivier Muytjens	1–5, 7–9
(Germany) Pit Lane - AMC Sankt Vith	Toyota GT86 Cup	270	(Belgium) Marc Duez	1–2
(Germany) Team Mathol Racing e.V.	Toyota GT86 Cup	271	(Mexico) Juan Carlos Carmona Chavez	3
(Germany) Team Mathol Racing e.V.	Toyota GT86 Cup	271	(Germany) Matthias Trinius	3
TBA	Subaru BRZ Cup	275	(Germany) Lucian Gavris	All
TBA	Subaru BRZ Cup	275	(Germany) Tim Schrick	All
TBA	Subaru BRZ Cup	275	(Finland) Alec Arho Havrén	9
(Germany) Profi Car Team Halder	Honda S2000	277	(Germany) Mike Halder	8
(Germany) Profi Car Team Halder	Honda S2000	277	(Germany) Michelle Halder	8
(Japan) Toyota Gazoo Racing	Toyota GT86 Cup	279	(Japan) Masahiro Sasaki	1–3
(Japan) Toyota Gazoo Racing	Toyota GT86 Cup	279	(Japan) Hiroaki Ishiura	1
(Japan) Toyota Gazoo Racing	Toyota GT86 Cup	279	(Japan) Kumi Sato	2
(Japan) Toyota Gazoo Racing	Toyota GT86 Cup	279	(Japan) Naoya Gamou	3
(Japan) Toyota Gazoo Racing	Toyota GT86 Cup	280	(Japan) Masahiro Sasaki	2–3
(Japan) Toyota Gazoo Racing	Toyota GT86 Cup	280	(Germany) Uwe Kleen	2–3
(Germany) Ring Racing with Revel	Toyota GT86 Cup	281	(Japan) Turbo Asahi	1
(Germany) Ring Racing with Revel	Toyota GT86 Cup	281	(Japan) Nanami Tsukamoto	1
(Germany) Ring Racing with Revel	Toyota GT86 Cup	281	(Germany) Günther Convent	2–3
(Switzerland) Autorama AG	Toyota GT86 Cup	281	(Switzerland) Armando Stanco	8–9
(Switzerland) Autorama AG	Toyota GT86 Cup	281	(Switzerland) Dario Stanco	8–9
Toyota Gazoo Racing Team Thailand	Toyota C-HR Cup	282	(Thailand) Nattavude Charoensukhawatana	1, 3
Toyota Gazoo Racing Team Thailand	Toyota C-HR Cup	282	(Thailand) Suttipong Smittachartch	1
Toyota Gazoo Racing Team Thailand	Toyota C-HR Cup	282	(Japan) Naoki Kawamura	3
Toyota Gazoo Racing Team Thailand	Toyota C-HR Cup	283	(Thailand) Manat Kulapalanont	1
Toyota Gazoo Racing Team Thailand	Toyota C-HR Cup	283	(Thailand) Nattapong Hortongkum	1
Toyota Gazoo Racing Team Thailand	Toyota C-HR Cup	283	(Thailand) Grant Supaphongs	2
Toyota Gazoo Racing Team Thailand	Toyota C-HR Cup	283	(Thailand) Arthit Ruengsomboon	2
Toyota Gazoo Racing Team Thailand	Toyota C-HR Cup	283	(Japan) Naoki Kawamura	2
Toyota Gazoo Racing Team Thailand	Toyota C-HR Cup	283	(Japan) Takayuki Kinoshita	2
	Renault Clio	284	(Germany) Marcel Unland	9
	Renault Clio	284	(Germany) Christoph Schmitz	9
(Germany) Manheller Racing	Toyota GT86 Cup	285	(Germany) Christopher Chadwick	1–2
(Germany) Manheller Racing	Toyota GT86 Cup	285	(Switzerland) Manuel Amweg	1
(Germany) Manheller Racing	Toyota GT86 Cup	285	(Switzerland) Dominic Tranchet	2–3
(Germany) Manheller Racing	Toyota GT86 Cup	285	(Austria) Werner Gusenbauer	3
(Japan) TMG United	Toyota GT86 Cup	286	(Germany) Adrian Brusius	1–2
(Japan) TMG United	Toyota GT86 Cup	286	(Germany) Alex Fielenbach	1–2
(Germany) Novel Racing	Toyota GT86 Cup	289	(Germany) Uwe Kleen	9
(Germany) Novel Racing	Toyota GT86 Cup	289	(Germany) Klaus Völker	9
(Germany) MSC Adenau e. V. im ADAC	Renault Clio	290	(Germany) Stephan Epp	2–3
(Germany) MSC Adenau e. V. im ADAC	Renault Clio	290	(Germany) Gerrit Holthaus	2–3
(Germany) MSC Adenau e. V. im ADAC	Renault Clio	290	(Germany) Michael Bohrer	2–3
SP3T
Team	Car	No.	Drivers	Rounds
(Germany) Team AVIA Sorg Rennsport	Audi RS3 LMS TCR	182	(Germany) Murat Ates	7, 9
(Germany) Team AVIA Sorg Rennsport	Audi RS3 LMS TCR	182	(Switzerland) Philipp Hagnauer	7
(Germany) Team AVIA Sorg Rennsport	Audi RS3 LMS TCR	182	(Germany) Philip Schauerte	7
(Germany) Team AVIA Sorg Rennsport	Audi RS3 LMS TCR	182	(Italy) Ugo Vicenzi	9
(Germany) Team AVIA Sorg Rennsport	Audi RS3 LMS TCR	182	(Italy) Alberto Carobbio	9
	Volkswagen Scirocco	299	(Germany) Christopher Bruchmann	2
	Volkswagen Scirocco	299	TBA	TBA
(Germany) Giti Tire Motorsport By WS Racing	Volkswagen Golf	300	(Germany) Ronja Assmann	1–3
(Germany) Giti Tire Motorsport By WS Racing	Volkswagen Golf	300	(Switzerland) Jasmin Preisig	1–3
(Germany) Giti Tire Motorsport By WS Racing	Volkswagen Golf	300	(Germany) Carrie Schreiner	1–2, 4, 8–9
(Germany) Giti Tire Motorsport By WS Racing	Volkswagen Golf	300	(Austria) Laura Kraihamer	4
(Germany) Giti Tire Motorsport By WS Racing	Volkswagen Golf	300	(United Kingdom) James Breakell	7
(Germany) Giti Tire Motorsport By WS Racing	Volkswagen Golf	300	(Germany) Niklas Kry	7
(Germany) Giti Tire Motorsport By WS Racing	Volkswagen Golf	300	(Switzerland) Roger Vögeli	7
(Germany) Giti Tire Motorsport By WS Racing	Volkswagen Golf	300	(France) Célia Martin	8–9
(Germany) Giti Tire Motorsport By WS Racing	Volkswagen Golf N24	334	(Germany) Ullrich Schmidt	1–4, 6–9
(Germany) Giti Tire Motorsport By WS Racing	Volkswagen Golf N24	334	(Germany) Petra Baecker	1, 3
(Germany) Giti Tire Motorsport By WS Racing	Volkswagen Golf N24	334	(Germany) Florian Boenisch	1, 4, 6–9
(Germany) Giti Tire Motorsport By WS Racing	Volkswagen Golf N24	334	(Germany) Ralf Lammering	2, 9
(Germany) Giti Tire Motorsport By WS Racing	Volkswagen Golf N24	334	(United Kingdom) James Breakell	2
(Germany) Giti Tire Motorsport By WS Racing	Volkswagen Golf N24	334	(Germany) Mario Handrick	3, 8
(Germany) MSC Sinzig e.V. im ADAC	Audi RS3 LMS TCR	301	(Germany) Roland Waschkau	5, 9
(Germany) MSC Sinzig e.V. im ADAC	Audi RS3 LMS TCR	301	(Germany) Peter Muggianu	5, 9
(Germany) MSC Sinzig e.V. im ADAC	Audi RS3 LMS TCR	301	(Switzerland) Roger Vögeli	5, 9
(Germany) MSC Sinzig e.V. im ADAC	Audi RS3 LMS TCR	301	(Germany) Rudi Speich	5
(Germany) MSC Sinzig e.V. im ADAC	Volkswagen Golf N24	304	(Germany) Niklas Kry	2–6
(Germany) MSC Sinzig e.V. im ADAC	Volkswagen Golf N24	304	(Germany) Thomas Mühlenz	2–6
(Germany) MSC Sinzig e.V. im ADAC	Volkswagen Golf N24	304	(Germany) Welf Hermann	3, 6
(Germany) MSC Sinzig e.V. im ADAC	Volkswagen Golf N24	324	(Germany) Jens Wulf	9
(Germany) MSC Sinzig e.V. im ADAC	Volkswagen Golf N24	324	(Germany) Dr. Stefan Lohn	9
(Germany) MSC Sinzig e.V. im ADAC	Volkswagen Golf N24	324	(Germany) Andre Benninghofen	9
(Germany) MSC Adenau e.V. im ADAC	Opel Astra CUP	302	(Switzerland) Herbert Schmidt	7
(Germany) MSC Adenau e.V. im ADAC	Opel Astra CUP	302	(France) Carlos Antunes Tavares	7
(Germany) MSC Adenau e.V. im ADAC	Opel Astra CUP	302	(France) Francois Wales	7
(Germany) MSC Adenau e.V. im ADAC	Opel Astra CUP	302	(Germany) Tobias Jung	8
(Germany) MSC Adenau e.V. im ADAC	Opel Astra CUP	302	(Austria) Daniel Jenichen	8
(Germany) MSC Adenau e.V. im ADAC	Opel Astra CUP	302	(Luxembourg) Mike Schmit	8
TBA	Volkswagen Golf N24	303	(Germany) Thomas Mennecke	1, 3–4, 6–7, 9
TBA	Volkswagen Golf N24	303	(Germany) Alexander Schmidt	1, 3–4, 6–7, 9
TBA	Volkswagen Golf N24	303	(Germany) Jens Wulf	1, 4, 6–7
(Germany) Bonk Motorsport	Audi RS3 LMS TCR	310	(Germany) Hermann Bock	2, 4–9
(Germany) Bonk Motorsport	Audi RS3 LMS TCR	310	(Germany) Michael Bonk	2, 4, 6
(Germany) Bonk Motorsport	Audi RS3 LMS TCR	310	(Germany) Max Partl	5
(Germany) Bonk Motorsport	Audi RS3 LMS TCR	310	(Germany) Jürgen Nett	7–8
(Germany) Fanclub Mathol Racing e.V.	SEAT León Cup Racer	311	(Germany) Jörg Kittelmann	All
(Germany) Fanclub Mathol Racing e.V.	SEAT León Cup Racer	311	(Germany) Thomas Heinrich	1–3
(Germany) Fanclub Mathol Racing e.V.	SEAT León Cup Racer	311	(Germany) Wolfgang Weber	2, 4–9
	Opel Astra TCR	321	(Luxembourg) Mike Schmit	2
	Opel Astra TCR	321	(Germany) Michael Eichhorn	2
	Seat Leon	322	(Germany) Meik Utsch	4–7
	Seat Leon	322	(Germany) Frank Eickholt	4
	Seat Leon	322	(Germany) Armin Eckl	5–7
	Seat Leon	322	(Germany) Dennis Eckl	5–7
	Audi TTRS2	323	(Germany) Stefan Wieninger	5–6
	Audi TTRS2	323	(Germany) Christian Schmitz	5–6
	Audi TTRS2	323	(Germany) Ulrich Andree	6
(Germany) MSC Münster	Honda Civic	329	(Germany) Florian Rass	7–8
(Germany) MSC Münster	Honda Civic	329	(Germany) Morris Kubatzki	7–8
	Volkswagen Golf GTI TCR	333	(United States) Andreas Gabler	3
	Volkswagen Golf GTI TCR	333	(Italy) Marco Ferraro	3
SP-Pro
Team	Car	No.	Drivers	Rounds
(Japan) Toyota Gazoo Racing	Lexus LC N24 GT	345	(Japan) Naoya Gamou	1, 3
(Japan) Toyota Gazoo Racing	Lexus LC N24 GT	345	(Japan) Hiroaki Ishiura	1
(Japan) Toyota Gazoo Racing	Lexus LC N24 GT	345	(Japan) Kazuya Oshima	1
(Japan) Toyota Gazoo Racing	Lexus LC N24 GT	345	(Japan) Yuichi Nakayama	3
SP2T
Team	Car	No.	Drivers	Rounds
Team EURO REPAR CAR Service Germany	Peugeot 308 Racing Cup	308	(Germany) Joachim Nett	All
Team EURO REPAR CAR Service Germany	Peugeot 308 Racing Cup	308	(Germany) Jürgen Nett	All
Team EURO REPAR CAR Service Germany	Peugeot 308 Racing Cup	308	(United Kingdom) Bradley Philpot	All
(Switzerland) Team Rallye Top	Peugeot RCZ A3 GT	385	(Switzerland) Bernhard Badertscher	1, 7
(Switzerland) Team Rallye Top	Peugeot RCZ A3 GT	385	(Switzerland) Max Langenegger	1, 7
	Mini JCW Coupe	387	(Germany) Steven Fürsch	4–8
	Mini JCW Coupe	387	(Germany) Jürgen Bretschneider	4–8
V6
Team	Car	No.	Drivers	Rounds
(Germany) Black Falcon Team TMD Textar	Porsche 991 Carrera	394	(Germany) Carsten Palluth	1–3
(Germany) Black Falcon Team TMD Textar	Porsche 991 Carrera	394	(Luxembourg) Carlos Rivas	1–3
(Germany) Black Falcon Team TMD Textar	Porsche 991 Carrera	394	(Germany) Thomas Bolz	1
(Germany) Black Falcon Team TMD Textar	Porsche 991 Carrera	394	(Germany) Martin Meenen	2
(Germany) Black Falcon Team TMD Textar	Porsche 991 Carrera	394	(Germany) Tobias Wahl	2–3
(Germany) Black Falcon Team TMD Textar	Porsche 991 Carrera	394	(Germany) Uwe Lebens	8–9
(Germany) Black Falcon Team TMD Textar	Porsche 991 Carrera	394	(Germany) Michael Lindmayer	8–9
(Germany) Black Falcon Team TMD Textar	Porsche 991 Carrera	395	(Russia) Alexander Akimenkov	All
(Germany) Black Falcon Team TMD Textar	Porsche 991 Carrera	395	(Germany) Ronny Lethmate	All
(Germany) Black Falcon Team TMD Textar	Porsche 991 Carrera	395	(Russia) Vasilii Selivanov	All
(Germany) Black Falcon Team TMD Textar	Porsche 991 Carrera	395	(Italy) Gabriele Piana	6
(Germany) Pixum Team Adrenalin Motorsport	Porsche Cayman S	400	(Spain) Carlos Arimón Solivellas	1–4
(Germany) Pixum Team Adrenalin Motorsport	Porsche Cayman S	400	(Germany) Christian Büllesbach	1–4
(Germany) Pixum Team Adrenalin Motorsport	Porsche Cayman S	400	(Germany) Andreas Schettler	1–4
(Germany) Pixum Team Adrenalin Motorsport	Porsche Cayman S	400	(Germany) Ioannis Smyrlis	1–2
(Germany) Pixum Team Adrenalin Motorsport	Porsche Cayman S	400	(South Africa) David Perel	3
	Porsche 991 Carrera	401	(Germany) Anna Lena Binkowska	4, 7–9
	Porsche 991 Carrera	401	(Germany) Dietmar Binkowska	4, 7–9
	Porsche 991 Carrera	401	(Germany) David Binkowska	4, 7–9
	Mercedes-Benz SLK 350	404	(Germany) Bertin Sing	3–4, 7, 9
	Mercedes-Benz SLK 350	404	(Germany) Eugen Sing	3–4, 7, 9
(Germany) PROsport Performance	Porsche Cayman	415	(United Kingdom) JM Littman	1
(Germany) PROsport Performance	Porsche Cayman	415	(Netherlands) Kay van Berlo	1
(Germany) PROsport Performance	Porsche Cayman	415	(Netherlands) Paul Harkema	8
(Germany) Dr.Dr. Stein Tveten GmbH	Porsche 911	416	(Germany) Holger Kroth	1–5, 7–8
(Germany) Dr.Dr. Stein Tveten GmbH	Porsche 911	416	(Germany) Stein Tveten	1–5, 7–8
(Germany) Dr.Dr. Stein Tveten GmbH	Porsche 911	416	(Switzerland) Friedrich Obermeier	2–5
(Germany) Team AVIA Sorg Rennsport	Porsche Cayman S	418	(Switzerland) Philipp Hagnauer	1, 3–6, 8–9
(Germany) Team AVIA Sorg Rennsport	Porsche Cayman S	418	(Germany) Philip Schauerte	1, 3–6, 8–9
(Germany) Team AVIA Sorg Rennsport	Porsche Cayman S	418	(Germany) Murat Ates	1, 3–6, 8
(Germany) Team AVIA Sorg Rennsport	Porsche Cayman S	418	(Germany) Björn Simon	1, 3–4, 6, 8–9
(Germany) Team AVIA Sorg Rennsport	Porsche Cayman S	418	(Switzerland) Jérôme de Sadeleer	5
(Germany) Team AVIA Sorg Rennsport	Porsche Cayman S	418	(Turkey) Emir Asari	9
	Porsche Cayman S	433	(Germany) "Putbert"	5, 9
	Porsche Cayman S	433	(Russia) Sergey Ponkin	5
	Porsche Cayman S	433	(Russia) Aleksandr Samokhvalov	5
	Porsche Cayman S	433	(Switzerland) Michelangelo Comazzi	9
(Germany) Team Mathol Racing e.V.	Porsche Cayman S	435	(Germany) Wolfgang Weber	All
(Germany) Team Mathol Racing e.V.	Porsche Cayman S	435	(Germany) Alex Fielenbach	All
(Germany) Team Mathol Racing e.V.	Porsche Cayman S	435	(Argentina) Roberto Falcón	1–6
(Germany) Team Mathol Racing e.V.	Porsche Cayman S	435	(Germany) Hendrik Still	5
(Germany) Team Mathol Racing e.V.	Porsche Cayman S	435	(Spain) Andy Soucek	6
(Germany) Team Mathol Racing e.V.	Porsche Cayman S	435	(Argentina) Marcos Adolfo Vazquez	7–8
V5
Team	Car	No.	Drivers	Rounds
(Germany) PROsport Performance	Porsche Cayman	437	(Croatia) Martin Kodrić	1–2
(Germany) PROsport Performance	Porsche Cayman	437	(Switzerland) Hugo de Sadeleer	1–2
(Germany) PROsport Performance	Porsche Cayman	437	(United Kingdom) JM Littman	3, 5
(Germany) PROsport Performance	Porsche Cayman	437	(Japan) João Paulo de Oliveira	3
(Germany) PROsport Performance	Porsche Cayman	437	(Belgium) Guido Dumarey	4, 6
(Germany) PROsport Performance	Porsche Cayman	437	(Switzerland) Alexander Walker	4, 6
(Germany) PROsport Performance	Porsche Cayman	437	(Switzerland) Cedric Freiburghaus	5–6
(Germany) PROsport Performance	Porsche Cayman	437	(France) Jeremie Lesoudier	5
(Germany) PROsport Performance	Porsche Cayman	437	(Italy) Mattia Drudi	8–9
(Germany) PROsport Performance	Porsche Cayman	437	(France) Theau Haslin	8–9
(Germany) PROsport Performance	Porsche Cayman	454	(Australia) Josh Burdon	1–3
(Germany) PROsport Performance	Porsche Cayman	454	(Italy) Edoardo Liberati	1–3
(Germany) 9und11 Racing Team	Porsche Cayman	440	(Germany) Niklas Oehme	All
(Germany) 9und11 Racing Team	Porsche Cayman	440	(Germany) Leonard Oehme	1–3, 5–9
(Germany) 9und11 Racing Team	Porsche Cayman	440	(Germany) Ralf Oehme	4, 6
(Germany) Pixum Team Adrenalin Motorsport	Porsche Cayman	444	(Germany) Norbert Fischer	All
(Germany) Pixum Team Adrenalin Motorsport	Porsche Cayman	444	(Germany) Daniel Zils	All
(Germany) Pixum Team Adrenalin Motorsport	Porsche Cayman	444	(Norway) Oskar Sandberg	All
(Germany) Pixum Team Adrenalin Motorsport	Porsche Cayman	445	(Germany) Ulrich Korn	All
(Germany) Pixum Team Adrenalin Motorsport	Porsche Cayman	445	(Luxembourg) Charles Oakes	1–2, 4–9
(Germany) Pixum Team Adrenalin Motorsport	Porsche Cayman	445	(Republic of Ireland) Robert Woodside	1
(Germany) Pixum Team Adrenalin Motorsport	Porsche Cayman	445	(Switzerland) Urs Zünd	2–3
(Germany) Pixum Team Adrenalin Motorsport	Porsche Cayman	445	(Switzerland) Markus Zünd	2–3
(Germany) Pixum Team Adrenalin Motorsport	Porsche Cayman	445	(Germany) Daniel Reuter	4
(Germany) Pixum Team Adrenalin Motorsport	Porsche Cayman	445	(Germany) Matthias Beckwermert	5–7
(Germany) Pixum Team Adrenalin Motorsport	Porsche Cayman	445	(Finland) Ilmari Korpivaara	5
(Germany) Pixum Team Adrenalin Motorsport	Porsche Cayman	445	(Germany) Karl Brinker	8
	BMW M3	449	(United Kingdom) Simon Glenn	9
	BMW M3	449	(United Kingdom) Stuart Waite	9
	Porsche Cayman	450	(Sweden) Peter Baumann	4, 7
	Porsche Cayman	450	(Germany) Alexander Mohr	4
	Porsche Cayman	450	(Germany) Uwe Kleen	4
	Porsche Cayman	450	(Sweden) Niclas Jalvinger	7
	Porsche Cayman	450	(Sweden) Johan Andersson	7
TBA	BMW M3	455	(Liechtenstein) Matthias Kaiser	1–2
TBA	BMW M3	455	(Germany) Bernd Kleeschulte	1–2
TBA	BMW M3	455	(Germany) Florian Quante	1–2
	Porsche Cayman	456	(Denmark) Henrik Bollerslev	2, 5
	Porsche Cayman	456	(Switzerland) Marco Timbal	2, 5
	Porsche Cayman	456	(Germany) André Krumbach	5
	Porsche Cayman	456	(United Kingdom) David Perel	5
	Porsche Cayman	456	(Germany) Jochen Krumbach	9
(Germany) FK Performance Motorsport	Porsche Cayman	458	(Germany) Fabio Grosse	1–8
(Germany) FK Performance Motorsport	Porsche Cayman	458	(Germany) Jens Moetefindt	1–8
(Germany) FK Performance Motorsport	Porsche Cayman	458	(Germany) Fabian Finck	1–3, 5–8
(Germany) Care For Climate	Porsche Cayman	460	(Germany) Daniel Blickle	1–7, 9
(Germany) Care For Climate	Porsche Cayman	460	(Germany) Niklas Steinhaus	1–7, 9
TBA	Porsche Cayman	461	(Belgium) Franz Josef Georges	1, 4, 7, 9
TBA	Porsche Cayman	461	(Germany) Welf Hermann	1
TBA	Porsche Cayman	461	(Germany) Niklas Kry	1
TBA	Porsche Cayman	461	(Austria) Werner Gusenbauer	3–4, 7
TBA	Porsche Cayman	461	(Germany) Matthias Beckwermert	3
TBA	Porsche Cayman	461	(Republic of Ireland) Robert Woodside	3
TBA	Porsche Cayman	461	(Germany) Andreas Herwerth	4, 7, 9
TBA	Porsche Cayman	461	(Germany) Fabio Sacchi	9
	Porsche Cayman	462	(Germany) Hans Sadler	5, 7, 9
	Porsche Cayman	462	(Germany) Jürgen Vöhringer	5, 7, 9
	Porsche Cayman	462	(Germany) Jerome Larbi	5
(Germany) Schmickler Performance powered by Ravenol	Porsche Cayman	463	(Germany) Albert Egbert	5, 9
(Germany) Schmickler Performance powered by Ravenol	Porsche Cayman	463	(Germany) Felix Horn	5, 9
(Germany) Schmickler Performance powered by Ravenol	Porsche Cayman	463	(Germany) Helmut Baumann	9
(Germany) Team AVIA Sorg Rennsport	Porsche Cayman	464	(Germany) Björn Simon	2
(Germany) Team AVIA Sorg Rennsport	Porsche Cayman	464	(Switzerland) Philipp Hagnauer	2
(Germany) Team AVIA Sorg Rennsport	Porsche Cayman	464	(Germany) Murat Ates	2
(Germany) Team AVIA Sorg Rennsport	Porsche Cayman	464	(Germany) Philip Schauerte	2
	BMW M3	466	(Germany) Holger Gachot	3, 9
	BMW M3	466	(Germany) Sophia Gachot	3, 9
	BMW 330i	468	(Germany) Kai Kording	4
	BMW 330i	468	(Germany) Nico Möller	4
	BMW 330i	468	(Germany) Markus Müller	4
TBA	Porsche Cayman	470	(Liechtenstein) Nick Hancke	1–2
TBA	Porsche Cayman	470	(Japan) Kohei Fukuda	1
TBA	Porsche Cayman	470	(Germany) Thomas Hetzer	1
TBA	Porsche Cayman	470	(France) Olivier Baharian	2
TBA	Porsche Cayman	470	(France) Thierry Blaise	2
VT3
Team	Car	No.	Drivers	Rounds
	Porsche 718 Cayman GTS	471	(Germany) Jim Cameron	5–6
	Porsche 718 Cayman GTS	471	(Netherlands) Jordy Van Rossenberg	5–6
	Porsche 718 Cayman GTS	471	(Netherlands) Marco Van Ramshorst	5
(Germany) PROsport Performance	Porsche Cayman	472	(Belgium) Guido Dumarey	1–3, 5, 8–9
(Germany) PROsport Performance	Porsche Cayman	472	(Japan) João Paulo de Oliveira	1
(Germany) PROsport Performance	Porsche Cayman	472	(Netherlands) Kay van Berlo	2–3
(Germany) PROsport Performance	Porsche Cayman	472	(Germany) Luca Engstler	2
(Germany) PROsport Performance	Porsche Cayman	472	(Switzerland) Alexander Walker	5, 8–9
(Germany) PROsport Performance	Porsche Cayman	472	(Germany) Arno Klasen	5
(Germany) MSC Sinzig e.V. im ADAC	Porsche Cayman 718	473	(Germany) Ralf Zensen	2, 5–9
(Germany) MSC Sinzig e.V. im ADAC	Porsche Cayman 718	473	(Germany) Fabian Peitzmeier	2, 5–9
(Germany) MSC Sinzig e.V. im ADAC	Porsche Cayman 718	473	(Netherlands) Patrick Huisman	2, 5
(Germany) MSC Sinzig e.V. im ADAC	Porsche Cayman 718	473	(Germany) Christian Büllesbach	5–9
(Germany) MSC Sinzig e.V. im ADAC	Porsche Cayman 718	473	(Germany) Andreas Schettler	6–9
(Germany) Team Mathol Racing e.V.	Porsche Cayman 718	474	(Switzerland) Sebastian Schäfer	7–8
(Germany) Team Mathol Racing e.V.	Porsche Cayman 718	474	(Argentina) Roberto Falcón	7
(Germany) Team Mathol Racing e.V.	Porsche Cayman 718	474	(France) Dorian Boccolacci	8–9
(Germany) Team Mathol Racing e.V.	Porsche Cayman 718	474	(Morocco) Mehdi Bennani	8
(Germany) Team Mathol Racing e.V.	Porsche Cayman 718	474	(United States) Cameron Evans	9
VT2
Team	Car	No.	Drivers	Rounds
(Germany) rent2Drive-Familia-racing	Renault Megane RS GT	494	(Germany) Axel Jahn	1–4, 6–7
(Germany) rent2Drive-Familia-racing	Renault Megane RS GT	494	(Germany) Peter Muggianu	1, 4, 7
(Germany) rent2Drive-Familia-racing	Renault Megane RS GT	494	(Germany) Luca Engstler	1
(Germany) rent2Drive-Familia-racing	Renault Megane RS GT	494	(Germany) Julian Koch	2–4, 6–7
(Germany) rent2Drive-Familia-racing	Renault Megane RS GT	494	(Turkey) Alparslan Timur Yigit	2–3
(Germany) rent2Drive-Familia-racing	Renault Megane RS GT	494	(Turkey) Caglayan Celik	6
(Germany) rent2Drive-Familia-racing	Renault Megane RS GT	505	(Italy) Aleardo Bertelli	1, 3–4, 8–9
(Germany) rent2Drive-Familia-racing	Renault Megane RS GT	505	(Italy) Stefano Croci	1, 3–4, 8–9
(Germany) rent2Drive-Familia-racing	Renault Megane RS GT	505	(Italy) Graziano Grazzini	1, 3–4, 8
(Germany) Manheller Racing	BMW 330i GT	495	(United Kingdom) Martin Owen	All
(Germany) Manheller Racing	BMW 330i GT	495	(Germany) Kurt Strube	All
(Germany) Manheller Racing	BMW 330i GT	495	(Germany) Jens Noeske	2–3, 6–7
(Germany) Manheller Racing	BMW 330i GT	495	(Germany) Marcel Manheller	4
(Germany) Manheller Racing	BMW 330i GT	495	(Germany) Ronny Lethmate	5
(Germany) Manheller Racing	BMW 330i GT	495	(Austria) Markus Fischer	5
(Germany) Manheller Racing	BMW 330i GT	495	(Germany) Harald Barth	8–9
(Germany) Manheller Racing	BMW 328i GT	510	(Germany) Carsten Knechtges	All
(Germany) Manheller Racing	BMW 328i GT	510	(Germany) Marcel Manheller	All
(Germany) Manheller Racing	BMW 328i GT	510	(Germany) Bernd Kleeschulte	5
(Germany) Manheller Racing	BMW 328i GT	510	(Germany) Florian Quante	5
	Renault Megane RS	496	(Germany) Ralf Wiesner	2, 4–6, 9
	Renault Megane RS	496	(Germany) Carsten Erpenbach	2, 4–6, 9
(Germany) Hyundai Team Engstler	Hyundai i30 N Fastback	498	(Germany) Franz Engstler	2
(Germany) Hyundai Team Engstler	Hyundai i30 N Fastback	498	(Germany) Luca Engstler	2
(Germany) Hyundai Team Engstler	Hyundai i30 N Fastback	498	(Germany) Kai Jordan	2
(Germany) MSC Wahlscheid	Renault Megane RS GT	499	(Germany) Kevin Wolters	3–9
(Germany) MSC Wahlscheid	Renault Megane RS GT	499	(Germany) David Schneider	3–8
(Germany) MSC Wahlscheid	Renault Megane RS GT	499	(Germany) Christian Albinger	3–6, 9
(Germany) MSC Wahlscheid	Renault Megane RS GT	499	(Germany) Marc Riebel	7, 9
(Germany) MSC Wahlscheid	Renault Megane RS GT	499	(Germany) Anton Bauer	8
(Germany) MSC Adenau	Opel Astra OPC	501	(France) Francois Wales	1–3
(Germany) MSC Adenau	Opel Astra OPC	501	(Switzerland) Herbert Schmidt	1, 8
(Germany) MSC Adenau	Opel Astra OPC	501	(France) Carlos Antunes Tavares	1
(Germany) MSC Adenau	Opel Astra OPC	501	(Germany) Christian Rziczny	2–3
(Germany) MSC Adenau	Opel Astra OPC	501	(Germany) Tobias Jung	2, 5–6, 9
(Germany) MSC Adenau	Opel Astra OPC	501	(France) Jean-Phlippe Imparato	3, 7
(Germany) MSC Adenau	Opel Astra OPC	501	(Germany) Andreas Kunert	3
(Germany) MSC Adenau	Opel Astra OPC	501	(Germany) Michael Eichhorn	5–6, 9
(Germany) MSC Adenau	Opel Astra OPC	501	(Luxembourg) Mike Schmit	5
(Germany) MSC Adenau	Opel Astra OPC	501	(Austria) Daniel Jenichen	6
(Germany) MSC Adenau	Opel Astra OPC	501	(Germany) Olivier Leibel	7–8
(Germany) MSC Adenau	Opel Astra OPC	501	(Germany) Roland Henning	9
TBA	BMW 125i GTR (E87)	502	(Sweden) Peter Baumann	1–2, 4–5
TBA	BMW 125i GTR (E87)	502	(Sweden) Niclas Svensson	1–2, 4–5
TBA	BMW 125i GTR (E87)	502	(Germany) Alexander Mohr	1–2, 5, 7
TBA	BMW 125i GTR (E87)	502	(Germany) Uwe Legermann	4
TBA	BMW 125i GTR (E87)	502	(Germany) Klaus Engelbrecht-Schnür	5, 7
TBA	BMW 125i GTR (E87)	502	(Switzerland) Daniel Nadir Hauser	7
	Renault Megane RS	503	(Germany) Mika Kitola	8–9
	Renault Megane RS	506	(Luxembourg) Max Lamesch	4–7, 9
	Renault Megane RS	506	(Luxembourg) Sebastien Carcone	4–7, 9
	Renault Megane RS	506	(France) Célia Martin	5
TBA	Renault Megane RS GT	507	(Germany) Janis Waldow	All
TBA	Renault Megane RS GT	507	(Germany) Finn Unteroberdörster	All
(Germany) mathilda racing	Volkswagen Scirocco	508	(Austria) Lukas Niedertscheider	5–6
(Germany) mathilda racing	Volkswagen Scirocco	508	(Germany) Timo Hochwind	5–6
(Germany) Automobilclub von Deutschland	Opel Astra J OPC	509	(Germany) Lena Strycek	8
(Germany) Automobilclub von Deutschland	Opel Astra J OPC	509	(Germany) Robin Strycek	8
(Germany) Automobilclub von Deutschland	Opel Astra J OPC	509	(Germany) Volker Strycek	8
V3
Team	Car	No.	Drivers	Rounds
	Subaru BRZ	516	(Germany) "Lutz Horst"	2, 5, 8
	Subaru BRZ	516	(Germany) "Ingo Horst"	2, 5, 8
	Subaru BRZ	516	(Germany) "Armin Horst"	8
V2
Team	Car	No.	Drivers	Rounds
	BMW 318is	549	(Germany) Reiner Thomas	2–9
	BMW 318is	549	(Germany) Manfred Schmitz	2–9
	BMW 318is	549	(Germany) Katja Thomas	4–5
H4
Team	Car	No.	Drivers	Rounds
	Porsche 911 GT3 Cup	588	(Germany) Ralf Schall	4, 6, 9
	Porsche 911 GT3 Cup	588	(Germany) Christopher Gerhard	4, 6, 9
(Switzerland) Hofor-Racing	BMW M3 CSL	593	(Switzerland) Michael Kroll	4, 7–8
(Switzerland) Hofor-Racing	BMW M3 CSL	593	(Switzerland) Alexander Prinz	4, 7–8
(Switzerland) Hofor-Racing	BMW M3 CSL	593	(Switzerland) Martin Kroll	4, 7
(Switzerland) Hofor-Racing	BMW M3 CSL	593	(Germany) Bernd Küpper	7
(Switzerland) Hofor-Racing	BMW M3 GTR	600	(Switzerland) Martin Kroll	2–3
(Switzerland) Hofor-Racing	BMW M3 GTR	600	(Switzerland) Michael Kroll	2–3
(Switzerland) Hofor-Racing	BMW M3 GTR	600	(Netherlands) Christian Frankenhout	2
(Switzerland) Hofor-Racing	BMW M3 GTR	600	(Switzerland) Alexander Prinz	3
(Germany) rent2drive-FAMILIA-racing	Porsche 911 GT3 Cup	595	(Germany) "Der Bommel"	4–5, 7–9
(Germany) rent2drive-FAMILIA-racing	Porsche 911 GT3 Cup	595	(Germany) Karl Pflanz	4–5, 7–9
(Germany) rent2drive-FAMILIA-racing	Porsche 911 GT3 Cup	595	(Germany) Dirk Vleugels	4–5
(Germany) rent2drive-FAMILIA-racing	Porsche 911 GT3 Cup	595	(Germany) Andreas Marc Riedl	5
(Germany) rent2drive-FAMILIA-racing	Porsche 911 GT3 Cup	595	(Turkey) Ersin Yücesan	7–9
(Germany) rent2drive-FAMILIA-racing	Porsche 911 GT3 Cup	595	(Germany) Jörg Wiskirchen	8
(Germany) clickversicherung.de	Porsche 911 GT3 Cup	598	(Germany) Robin Chrzanowski	6
(Germany) clickversicherung.de	Porsche 911 GT3 Cup	598	(Germany) Kersten Jodexnis	6
AT(-G)
Team	Car	No.	Drivers	Rounds
(Germany) Care For Climate	Porsche 991 GT3 Cup	320	(Germany) 'Tom'	1–3, 7, 9
(Germany) Care For Climate	Porsche 991 GT3 Cup	320	(Germany) Axel Duffner	1–2, 7
(Germany) Care For Climate	Porsche 991 GT3 Cup	320	(Germany) 'SMUDO'	1, 3, 7, 9
(Germany) Care For Climate	Porsche 991 GT3 Cup	320	(Germany) Daniel Schellhaas	2–3, 9
(Germany) Care For Climate	Porsche Cayman GT4 Clubsport MR	420	(Belgium) Denis Dupont	1–3
(Germany) Care For Climate	Porsche Cayman GT4 Clubsport MR	420	(New Zealand) Jaxon Evans	1–2
(Germany) Care For Climate	Porsche Cayman GT4 Clubsport MR	420	(Germany) Andreas Patzelt	2–3, 7
(Germany) Care For Climate	Porsche Cayman GT4 Clubsport MR	420	(Germany) Thomas Kiefer	3, 7, 9
(Germany) Care For Climate	Porsche Cayman GT4 Clubsport MR	420	(Germany) Daniel Schellhaas	7
(Germany) Care For Climate	Porsche Cayman GT4 Clubsport MR	420	(Germany) Matthias Beckwermert	9
(Germany) Care For Climate	Porsche Cayman GT4 Clubsport MR	420	(Germany) Axel Duffner	9
TBA	Ford Mustang GT WR	634	(Germany) Ralph Caba	1, 5
TBA	Ford Mustang GT WR	634	(Germany) Oliver Sprungmann	1, 5
Cup 5
Team	Car	No.	Drivers	Rounds
(Germany) Pixum Team Adrenalin Motorsport	BMW M240i Racing	650	(Germany) Yannick Fübrich	All
(Germany) Pixum Team Adrenalin Motorsport	BMW M240i Racing	650	(Austria) David Griessner	1, 3–9
(Germany) Pixum Team Adrenalin Motorsport	BMW M240i Racing	651	(Germany) Marcel Lenerz	1–3
(Germany) Pixum Team Adrenalin Motorsport	BMW M240i Racing	651	(Germany) Heinz Jürgen Kroner	1
(Germany) Pixum Team Adrenalin Motorsport	BMW M240i Racing	651	(Germany) "Jeff Young"	2–3, 7
(Germany) Pixum Team Adrenalin Motorsport	BMW M240i Racing	651	(Republic of Ireland) Robert Woodside	2
(Germany) Pixum Team Adrenalin Motorsport	BMW M240i Racing	651	(United States) Scott Smith	3
(Germany) Pixum Team Adrenalin Motorsport	BMW M240i Racing	651	(United Kingdom) Jack Mitchell	3
(Germany) Pixum Team Adrenalin Motorsport	BMW M240i Racing	651	(Italy) Francesco Bugane	4–5
(Germany) Pixum Team Adrenalin Motorsport	BMW M240i Racing	651	(Italy) Edoardo Bugane	4–5
(Germany) Pixum Team Adrenalin Motorsport	BMW M240i Racing	651	(Switzerland) Robert van Husen	4–5
(Germany) Pixum Team Adrenalin Motorsport	BMW M240i Racing	651	(Germany) Stefan Kruse	5
(Germany) Pixum Team Adrenalin Motorsport	BMW M240i Racing	651	(Germany) Laura Luft	7–8
(Germany) Pixum Team Adrenalin Motorsport	BMW M240i Racing	651	(Argentina) Andres Bruno Josephsohn	7
(Germany) Pixum Team Adrenalin Motorsport	BMW M240i Racing	651	(Germany) Daniel Attallah	8–9
(Germany) Pixum Team Adrenalin Motorsport	BMW M240i Racing	651	(Switzerland) Kevin Flückinger	8
(Germany) Pixum Team Adrenalin Motorsport	BMW M240i Racing	651	(Switzerland) Gustavo Xavier	8
(Germany) Pixum Team Adrenalin Motorsport	BMW M240i Racing	651	(Germany) Lutz Marc Rühl	9
(Germany) Pixum Team Adrenalin Motorsport	BMW M240i Racing	651	(United States) Paul Whiting	9
(Germany) Pixum Team Adrenalin Motorsport	BMW M240i Racing	652	(Italy) Francesco Merlini	All
(Germany) Pixum Team Adrenalin Motorsport	BMW M240i Racing	652	(Germany) Ben Bünnagel	1–7, 9
(Germany) Pixum Team Adrenalin Motorsport	BMW M240i Racing	652	(Bulgaria) Pavel Lefterov	1
(Germany) Pixum Team Adrenalin Motorsport	BMW M240i Racing	652	(Germany) Marcel Lenerz	2–3
(Germany) Pixum Team Adrenalin Motorsport	BMW M240i Racing	652	(Germany) Davide Dehren	4–6
(Germany) Pixum Team Adrenalin Motorsport	BMW M240i Racing	652	(Austria) David Griessner	8
(Germany) Pixum Team Adrenalin Motorsport	BMW M240i Racing	653	(Germany) Leonard Weiss	3
(Germany) Pixum Team Adrenalin Motorsport	BMW M240i Racing	653	(South Africa) David Perel	3
(Germany) Pixum Team Adrenalin Motorsport	BMW M240i Racing	653	(Australia) Nick Foster	3
(Germany) Pixum Team Adrenalin Motorsport	BMW M240i Racing	654	(China) Ran Liu	2, 5
(Germany) Pixum Team Adrenalin Motorsport	BMW M240i Racing	654	(United Kingdom) Tom Wrigley-Edwards	2
(Germany) Pixum Team Adrenalin Motorsport	BMW M240i Racing	654	(China) Xiao-Le He	2
(Germany) Pixum Team Adrenalin Motorsport	BMW M240i Racing	654	(United States) Andrie Hartanto	3
(Germany) Pixum Team Adrenalin Motorsport	BMW M240i Racing	654	(United States) Michael Ostby	3
(Germany) Pixum Team Adrenalin Motorsport	BMW M240i Racing	654	(Germany) Lutz Marc Rühl	4
(Germany) Pixum Team Adrenalin Motorsport	BMW M240i Racing	654	(United States) Andrew Engelmann	4
(Germany) Pixum Team Adrenalin Motorsport	BMW M240i Racing	654	(Germany) Tim Heinemann	4
(Germany) Pixum Team Adrenalin Motorsport	BMW M240i Racing	654	(Mexico) Juan Carlos Carmona Chavez	4
(Germany) Pixum Team Adrenalin Motorsport	BMW M240i Racing	654	(China) On Chris Chia	5
(Germany) Pixum Team Adrenalin Motorsport	BMW M240i Racing	654	(Italy) Rudolfo Funaro	6
(Germany) Pixum Team Adrenalin Motorsport	BMW M240i Racing	654	(Germany) Joachim Schulz	6
(Germany) Pixum Team Adrenalin Motorsport	BMW M240i Racing	654	(Germany) Laura Luft	6
(Germany) Pixum Team Adrenalin Motorsport	BMW M240i Racing	654	(Italy) Francesco Bugane	7
(Germany) Pixum Team Adrenalin Motorsport	BMW M240i Racing	654	(Italy) Edoardo Bugane	7
(Germany) Pixum Team Adrenalin Motorsport	BMW M240i Racing	654	(Switzerland) Robert van Husen	7
(Germany) Pixum Team Adrenalin Motorsport	BMW M240i Racing	655	(Sweden) Thomas Henriksson	All
(Germany) Pixum Team Adrenalin Motorsport	BMW M240i Racing	655	(Germany) Stefan Kruse	1–4, 6–9
(Germany) Pixum Team Adrenalin Motorsport	BMW M240i Racing	655	(Germany) Simon Klemund	1–3
(Germany) Pixum Team Adrenalin Motorsport	BMW M240i Racing	655	(Germany) Andreas Winkler	4–5
(Germany) Pixum Team Adrenalin Motorsport	BMW M240i Racing	655	(Germany) Tim Heinemann	5–6
(Germany) Pixum Team Adrenalin Motorsport	BMW M240i Racing	655	(Germany) Lutz Marc Rühl	5
(Germany) Pixum Team Adrenalin Motorsport	BMW M240i Racing	655	(Germany) Vincent Schwartz	6
(Germany) Pixum Team Adrenalin Motorsport	BMW M240i Racing	655	(Germany) Davide Dehren	7–8
(Germany) Pixum Team Adrenalin Motorsport	BMW M240i Racing	655	(Germany) Phillipp Leisen	9
(Germany) Pixum Team Adrenalin Motorsport	BMW M240i Racing	655	(Germany) Christopher Rink	9
(Belgium) Hakan Sari	BMW M240i Racing	658	(Belgium) Recep Sari	All
(Belgium) Hakan Sari	BMW M240i Racing	658	(Belgium) Hakan Sari	All
(Belgium) Hakan Sari	BMW M240i Racing	658	(Turkey) Ersin Yücesan	9
	BMW M240i Racing	660	(Germany) Alexander Müller	2
(Germany) Team Scheid - Honert Motorsport	BMW M240i Racing	666	(Germany) Lars Peucker	All
(Germany) Team Scheid - Honert Motorsport	BMW M240i Racing	666	(Germany) Nico Otto	All
(Germany) Team Scheid - Honert Motorsport	BMW M240i Racing	666	(Germany) Florian Naumann	5–9
(Germany) Scuderia Solagon	BMW M240i Racing	669	(Germany) Carsten Meurer	9
(Germany) Scuderia Solagon	BMW M240i Racing	669	(Germany) Daniel Jolk	9
	BMW M240i Racing	672	(Germany) Thomas Leyherr	7–9
	BMW M240i Racing	672	(Germany) Claus Dupré	8
	BMW M240i Racing	672	(Germany) Simon Klemund	9
(Switzerland) Hofor-Racing	BMW M240i Racing	673	(Germany) Lars Harbeck	4–9
(Switzerland) Hofor-Racing	BMW M240i Racing	673	(Germany) Sven Markert	4–9
(Switzerland) Hofor-Racing	BMW M240i Racing	673	(Germany) Daniel Schwerfeld	4, 6–9
(Switzerland) Hofor-Racing	BMW M240i Racing	673	(Germany) Philipp Weber	5
(Switzerland) Hofor-Racing	BMW M240i Racing	700	(Switzerland) Roger Kurzen	5
(Switzerland) Hofor-Racing	BMW M240i Racing	700	(Germany) Jürgen Meyer	5
(Switzerland) Hofor-Racing	BMW M240i Racing	700	(Germany) Andreas Möntmann	5
(Germany) MKR-Engineering	BMW M240i Racing	674	(Germany) Mark Hellerich	1–4
(Germany) MKR-Engineering	BMW M240i Racing	674	(Germany) Florian Naumann	1–4
(Germany) MKR-Engineering	BMW M240i Racing	674	(Germany) Dominik Lanz	5–6
(Germany) MKR-Engineering	BMW M240i Racing	674	(Germany) Mikhail Charoudin	5–6
(Germany) MKR-Engineering	BMW M240i Racing	674	(Denmark) Nicolai Sylvest	6
(Germany) MKR-Engineering	BMW M240i Racing	674	(Germany) Nils Koch	6
(Germany) MKR-Engineering	BMW M240i Racing	685	(Germany) Dominik Lanz	2–3
(Germany) MKR-Engineering	BMW M240i Racing	685	(France) Jean-Karl Vernay	2
(Germany) MKR-Engineering	BMW M240i Racing	685	(Germany) Nick Wüstenhagen	3
(Germany) MKR-Engineering	BMW M240i Racing	685	(Switzerland) Viktor Schyrba	4
(Germany) MKR-Engineering	BMW M240i Racing	685	(Switzerland) Benedikt Frei	4
(Germany) FK Performance Motorsport	BMW M240i Racing	677	(Germany) "Ethan Tremblay"	2–3
(Germany) FK Performance Motorsport	BMW M240i Racing	677	(Germany) Andreas Schaflitzl	2
(Germany) FK Performance Motorsport	BMW M240i Racing	677	(Germany) Alexander Müller	3, 5, 8
(Germany) FK Performance Motorsport	BMW M240i Racing	677	(Germany) Andreas Ott	3
(Germany) FK Performance Motorsport	BMW M240i Racing	677	(Switzerland) Ranko Mijatovic	4–8
(Germany) FK Performance Motorsport	BMW M240i Racing	677	(Switzerland) Gustavo Xavier	4–7
(Germany) FK Performance Motorsport	BMW M240i Racing	677	(Switzerland) Yannick Mettler	4
(Germany) FK Performance Motorsport	BMW M240i Racing	677	(Germany) Nick Wüstenhagen	5–7
(Germany) FK Performance Motorsport	BMW M240i Racing	678	(Germany) Andreas Ott	1–2
(Germany) FK Performance Motorsport	BMW M240i Racing	678	(Luxembourg) Alain Pier	1
(Germany) FK Performance Motorsport	BMW M240i Racing	678	(Germany) Mathis Tittert	1
(Germany) FK Performance Motorsport	BMW M240i Racing	678	(Germany) Thomas Heuchemer	2
(Germany) FK Performance Motorsport	BMW M240i Racing	678	(Germany) Alexander Müller	4, 6–7, 9
(Germany) FK Performance Motorsport	BMW M240i Racing	678	(Germany) Simon Klemund	4
(Germany) FK Performance Motorsport	BMW M240i Racing	678	(Finland) Juha Hannonen	4
(Germany) FK Performance Motorsport	BMW M240i Racing	678	(Germany) Florian Weber	6
(Germany) FK Performance Motorsport	BMW M240i Racing	678	(Switzerland) Yves Berger	7
(Germany) FK Performance Motorsport	BMW M240i Racing	678	(Germany) 'Manolo di Casa'	7
(Germany) FK Performance Motorsport	BMW M240i Racing	678	(Germany) Nick Wüstenhagen	9
(Germany) FK Performance Motorsport	BMW M240i Racing	678	(United Kingdom) Jasper Wei Heen Thong	9
(Germany) FK Performance Motorsport	BMW M240i Racing	679	(Finland) Juha Hannonen	All
(Germany) FK Performance Motorsport	BMW M240i Racing	679	(Germany) Christian Konnerth	All
(Germany) FK Performance Motorsport	BMW M240i Racing	679	(Germany) Marc Ehret	1–5
(Germany) Team Mathol Racing e.V.	BMW M240i Racing	680	(Morocco) Mehdi Bennani	2, 4
(Germany) Team Mathol Racing e.V.	BMW M240i Racing	680	(Australia) Josh Burdon	3
(Germany) Team Mathol Racing e.V.	BMW M240i Racing	680	(Italy) Edoardo Liberati	3
(Germany) Team Mathol Racing e.V.	BMW M240i Racing	680	(Japan) João Paulo de Oliveira	3
(Germany) Walkenhorst Motorsport	BMW M240i Racing	681	(United Kingdom) Sebastian Melrose	1–7
(Germany) Walkenhorst Motorsport	BMW M240i Racing	681	(United Kingdom) Michael Lyons	1–4
(Germany) Walkenhorst Motorsport	BMW M240i Racing	681	(United Kingdom) Tom Wrigley-Edwards	1
(Germany) Walkenhorst Motorsport	BMW M240i Racing	681	(United Kingdom) Will Tregurtha	2–3
(Germany) Walkenhorst Motorsport	BMW M240i Racing	681	(United Kingdom) Luke Williams	5–6
(Germany) Walkenhorst Motorsport	BMW M240i Racing	681	(United Kingdom) Jasper Wei Heen Thong	5, 7–8
(Germany) Walkenhorst Motorsport	BMW M240i Racing	681	(France) Romain Monti	5, 8
(Germany) Walkenhorst Motorsport	BMW M240i Racing	681	(Australia) Aidan Read	6, 9
(Germany) Walkenhorst Motorsport	BMW M240i Racing	681	(Germany) Timothy Morley	7–9
(Germany) Walkenhorst Motorsport	BMW M240i Racing	682	(United Kingdom) Ben Tuck	1–3
(Germany) Walkenhorst Motorsport	BMW M240i Racing	682	(Germany) Jörg Breuer	1–3
(Germany) Walkenhorst Motorsport	BMW M240i Racing	682	(United Kingdom) Will Tregurtha	1
(Germany) Walkenhorst Motorsport	BMW M240i Racing	682	(United Kingdom) Tom Wrigley-Edwards	2
(Germany) Walkenhorst Motorsport	BMW M240i Racing	682	(United Kingdom) Jordan Witt	3
(Germany) Walkenhorst Motorsport	BMW M240i Racing	682	(Germany) Tim Groneck	7
(Germany) Walkenhorst Motorsport	BMW M240i Racing	682	(Germany) Dirk Groneck	7
(Germany) Walkenhorst Motorsport	BMW M240i Racing	682	(United States) Charlie Postins	9
(Germany) Walkenhorst Motorsport	BMW M240i Racing	682	(United States) James Clay	9
TBA	BMW M240i Racing	688	(Germany) Noah Nagelsdiek	1–3
(Germany) Team AVIA Sorg Rennsport	BMW M240i Racing	693	(Denmark) Kristian Jepsen	1
(Germany) Team AVIA Sorg Rennsport	BMW M240i Racing	693	(Denmark) Jan Sorensen	1
(Germany) Team AVIA Sorg Rennsport	BMW M240i Racing	693	(Spain) Alvaro Fontes	2–3
(Germany) Team AVIA Sorg Rennsport	BMW M240i Racing	693	(Spain) Guillermo Aso Arjol	2
(Germany) Team AVIA Sorg Rennsport	BMW M240i Racing	693	(United Kingdom) Jasper Wei Heen Thong	3
(Germany) Team AVIA Sorg Rennsport	BMW M240i Racing	693	(United States) Ramana Lagemann	5, 7
(Germany) Team AVIA Sorg Rennsport	BMW M240i Racing	693	(United States) Emile Bouret	5
(Germany) Team AVIA Sorg Rennsport	BMW M240i Racing	693	(United States) Jonathan Miller	7
(Germany) Team AVIA Sorg Rennsport	BMW M240i Racing	693	(United States) Chris Allen	7
(Germany) Team AVIA Sorg Rennsport	BMW M240i Racing	693	(Germany) Marcel Marchewicz	9
(Germany) Team AVIA Sorg Rennsport	BMW M240i Racing	693	(United States) Chandler Hull	9
(Germany) Team AVIA Sorg Rennsport	BMW M240i Racing	693	(United States) Alec Udell	9
(Germany) Team AVIA Sorg Rennsport	BMW M240i Racing	694	(Sweden) Joel Eriksson	1
(Germany) Team AVIA Sorg Rennsport	BMW M240i Racing	694	(United States) Shane Lewis	1
(Germany) Team AVIA Sorg Rennsport	BMW M240i Racing	694	(United States) Cameron Evans	2, 5
(Germany) Team AVIA Sorg Rennsport	BMW M240i Racing	694	(Germany) Reinhard Schmiedel	2
(Germany) Team AVIA Sorg Rennsport	BMW M240i Racing	694	(United Kingdom) Wei Heen Jasper Thong	2
(Germany) Team AVIA Sorg Rennsport	BMW M240i Racing	694	(Spain) Joaquin Capsi Segura	3
(Germany) Team AVIA Sorg Rennsport	BMW M240i Racing	694	(Spain) Guillermo Aso Arjol	3
(Germany) Team AVIA Sorg Rennsport	BMW M240i Racing	694	(United States) Chandler Hull	5, 7–8
(Germany) Team AVIA Sorg Rennsport	BMW M240i Racing	694	(Mexico) Luis Ramirez	7
(Germany) Team AVIA Sorg Rennsport	BMW M240i Racing	694	(Italy) Ugo Vicenzi	7
(Germany) Team AVIA Sorg Rennsport	BMW M240i Racing	694	(United States) Alec Udell	8
(Germany) Team AVIA Sorg Rennsport	BMW M240i Racing	694	(Germany) Heiko Eichenberg	8
(Germany) Team AVIA Sorg Rennsport	BMW M240i Racing	695	(Norway) Inge Hansesaetre	All
(Germany) Team AVIA Sorg Rennsport	BMW M240i Racing	695	(Germany) Moritz Oberheim	All
(Germany) Team AVIA Sorg Rennsport	BMW M240i Racing	695	(Norway) Sindre Setsaas	All
(Germany) Team AVIA Sorg Rennsport	BMW M240i Racing	696	(United States) Ramana Lagemann	3
(Germany) Team AVIA Sorg Rennsport	BMW M240i Racing	696	(United States) Emile Bouret	3
(Germany) Team AVIA Sorg Rennsport	BMW M240i Racing	696	(United States) Jonathan Miller	3
(Germany) Leutheuser Racing&Events	BMW M240i Racing	699	(Germany) Klaus-Dieter Frommer	All
(Germany) Leutheuser Racing&Events	BMW M240i Racing	699	(Germany) Michael Hess	All
(Germany) Leutheuser Racing&Events	BMW M240i Racing	699	(Germany) Christian Kranenberg	1–6
(Germany) Leutheuser Racing&Events	BMW M240i Racing	699	(Switzerland) Guido Wirtz	7–9
Cup X
Team	Car	No.	Drivers	Rounds
(Germany) Teichmann Racing	KTM X-Bow GT4	927	(Germany) Stephan Brodmerkel	All
(Germany) Teichmann Racing	KTM X-Bow GT4	927	(Germany) Florian Bodin	1–3
(Germany) Teichmann Racing	KTM X-Bow GT4	927	(Austria) Reinhard Kofler	1, 8
(Germany) Teichmann Racing	KTM X-Bow GT4	927	(Germany) Uwe Flaig	4
(Germany) Teichmann Racing	KTM X-Bow GT4	927	(Austria) Karl-Heinz Teichmann	5–7
(Germany) Teichmann Racing	KTM X-Bow GT4	927	(Germany) Marc Hennerici	9
(Germany) Teichmann Racing	KTM X-Bow GT4	927	(Germany) Michael Mönch	9
(Germany) Teichmann Racing	KTM X-Bow GT4	929	(Germany) 'Maximilian'	All
(Germany) Teichmann Racing	KTM X-Bow GT4	929	(Germany) Maik Rönnefarth	All
(Germany) Teichmann Racing	KTM X-Bow GT4	929	(Germany) Georg Griesemann	1
(Germany) Teichmann Racing	KTM X-Bow GT4	929	(Austria) Reinhard Kofler	5
(Germany) Teichmann Racing	KTM X-Bow GT4	930	(Germany) Georg Griesemann	2–9
(Germany) Teichmann Racing	KTM X-Bow GT4	930	(Norway) Runar Vatne	2
(Germany) Teichmann Racing	KTM X-Bow GT4	930	(Germany) Lars Holtkamp	3
(Germany) Teichmann Racing	KTM X-Bow GT4	930	(Germany) Robert Schröder	3
(Germany) Teichmann Racing	KTM X-Bow GT4	930	(Germany) Florian Bodin	4–9
(Germany) Teichmann Racing	KTM X-Bow GT4	930	(Austria) Reinhard Kofler	5
(Germany) Teichmann Racing	KTM X-Bow GT4	930	(Norway) Christian Bjørn-Hansen	TBA
Cup 3 - Cayman
Team	Car	No.	Drivers	Rounds
(Germany) Schmickler FR Performance	Porsche 718 Cayman GT4 Clubsport	917	(Switzerland) Ivan Jacoma	All
(Germany) Schmickler FR Performance	Porsche 718 Cayman GT4 Clubsport	917	(Germany) Kai Riemer	All
(Germany) Schmickler FR Performance	Porsche 718 Cayman GT4 Clubsport	917	(Germany) Claudius Karch	1–7, 9
(Germany) Schmickler FR Performance	Porsche Cayman GT4 Clubsport MR	950	(Germany) Winfried Assmann	2, 9
(Germany) Schmickler FR Performance	Porsche Cayman GT4 Clubsport MR	950	(Germany) Ronja Assmann	2, 9
(Germany) Team Mathol Racing e.V.	Porsche Cayman GT4 Clubsport MR	940	(Germany) Henning Cramer	2
(Germany) Team Mathol Racing e.V.	Porsche Cayman GT4 Clubsport MR	940	(Germany) Matthias Trinius	2
(Germany) Team Mathol Racing e.V.	Porsche Cayman GT4 Clubsport MR	955	(Germany) 'Montana'	All
(Germany) Team Mathol Racing e.V.	Porsche Cayman GT4 Clubsport MR	955	(Switzerland) Rüdiger Schicht	1–5, 7–9
(Germany) Team Mathol Racing e.V.	Porsche Cayman GT4 Clubsport MR	955	(Germany) Henning Cramer	6
(Germany) Team Mathol Racing e.V.	Porsche 718 Cayman GT4 Clubsport	966	(Argentina) Marcos Adolfo Vazquez	All
(Germany) Team Mathol Racing e.V.	Porsche 718 Cayman GT4 Clubsport	966	(Germany) Marc Keilwerth	All
(Germany) Team Mathol Racing e.V.	Porsche 718 Cayman GT4 Clubsport	966	(Germany) Timo Mölig	5–9
(Germany) Team Mathol Racing e.V.	Porsche 718 Cayman GT4 Clubsport	966	(Germany) Hendrik Still	5
	Porsche Cayman GT4 Clubsport MR	941	(Germany) Ulf Ehninger	2
	Porsche Cayman GT4 Clubsport MR	941	(United States) Andreas Gabler	2
(Germany) KKrämer Racing	Porsche Cayman GT4 Clubsport MR	944	(United Kingdom) Jac Constable	1
(Germany) KKrämer Racing	Porsche Cayman GT4 Clubsport MR	944	(United Kingdom) Charles Ladell	1
(Germany) KKrämer Racing	Porsche Cayman GT4 Clubsport MR	944	(United Kingdom) Charlie Robertson	1
(Germany) KKrämer Racing	Porsche Cayman GT4 Clubsport MR	978	(Germany) Karsten Krämer	1, 4–9
(Germany) KKrämer Racing	Porsche Cayman GT4 Clubsport MR	978	(Russia) Alexey Veremenko	1, 4–8
(Germany) KKrämer Racing	Porsche Cayman GT4 Clubsport MR	978	(Germany) Heiko Tönges	1, 5–6, 8
(Germany) KKrämer Racing	Porsche Cayman GT4 Clubsport MR	978	(Germany) Ulf Ehninger	1
(Germany) KKrämer Racing	Porsche Cayman GT4 Clubsport MR	978	(United Kingdom) Charles Ladell	2–4
(Germany) KKrämer Racing	Porsche Cayman GT4 Clubsport MR	978	(United Kingdom) Charlie Robertson	2
(Germany) KKrämer Racing	Porsche Cayman GT4 Clubsport MR	978	(United Kingdom) Jac Constable	3
(Germany) KKrämer Racing	Porsche Cayman GT4 Clubsport MR	978	(Germany) Friedhelm Mihm	5
(Germany) KKrämer Racing	Porsche Cayman GT4 Clubsport MR	978	(United States) Jean-François Brunot	9
(Germany) KKrämer Racing	Porsche Cayman GT4 Clubsport MR	978	(Germany) Sascha Kloft	9
(Germany) Overdrive Racing	Porsche 718 Cayman GT4 Clubsport	945	(Germany) Alexander Mies	1–3
(Germany) Overdrive Racing	Porsche 718 Cayman GT4 Clubsport	945	(Germany) Mike David Ortmann	1–2, 4
(Germany) Overdrive Racing	Porsche 718 Cayman GT4 Clubsport	945	(Germany) Dirk Riebensahm	1, 3–4
(Germany) Overdrive Racing	Porsche 718 Cayman GT4 Clubsport	945	(Germany) Timo Moelig	2–4
(Germany) Overdrive Racing	Porsche Cayman GT4 Clubsport MR	946	(Zimbabwe) Axcil Jefferies	1–3
(Germany) Overdrive Racing	Porsche Cayman GT4 Clubsport MR	946	(Denmark) Nicolai Sylvest	1–2
(Germany) Overdrive Racing	Porsche Cayman GT4 Clubsport MR	946	(Bulgaria) Georgi Donchev	1
(Germany) Overdrive Racing	Porsche Cayman GT4 Clubsport MR	946	(Germany) Marvin Dienst	2
(Germany) Overdrive Racing	Porsche Cayman GT4 Clubsport MR	946	(Bulgaria) Pavel Lefterov	3
(Germany) Overdrive Racing	Porsche 718 Cayman GT4 Clubsport	947	(Germany) Timo Moelig	1
(Germany) Overdrive Racing	Porsche 718 Cayman GT4 Clubsport	947	(Germany) Marvin Dienst	1
(Germany) Overdrive Racing	Porsche 718 Cayman GT4 Clubsport	947	(Bulgaria) Pavel Lefterov	1
(Germany) Teichmann Racing	Porsche 718 Cayman GT4 Clubsport	960	(Luxembourg) Daniel Bohr	All
(Germany) Teichmann Racing	Porsche 718 Cayman GT4 Clubsport	960	(Germany) "Max"	All
(Germany) Teichmann Racing	Porsche 718 Cayman GT4 Clubsport	960	(Germany) "Jens"	1–5, 7–9
(Germany) Frikadelli Racing Team	Porsche Cayman GT4 Clubsport MR	962	(Germany) 'JULES'	All
(Germany) Frikadelli Racing Team	Porsche Cayman GT4 Clubsport MR	962	(Germany) Hendrik Von Danwitz	All
(Germany) Frikadelli Racing Team	Porsche Cayman GT4 Clubsport MR	962	(Germany) Sabine Schmitz	5
(Germany) Aimpoint Racing by Rothfuss Best Gabion	Porsche 718 Cayman GT4 Clubsport	964	(Germany) Axel Friedhoff	1, 3–4, 6–8
(Germany) Aimpoint Racing by Rothfuss Best Gabion	Porsche 718 Cayman GT4 Clubsport	964	(Germany) Jan Kasperlik	1
(Germany) Aimpoint Racing by Rothfuss Best Gabion	Porsche 718 Cayman GT4 Clubsport	964	(Germany) Max Friedhoff	3–4, 6–8
(Germany) Aimpoint Racing by Rothfuss Best Gabion	Porsche 718 Cayman GT4 Clubsport	964	(Germany) Volker Strycek	4, 6
(Belgium) Mühlner Motorsport	Porsche 718 Cayman GT4 Clubsport	969	(Germany) Alexander Schula	1–4, 7
(Belgium) Mühlner Motorsport	Porsche 718 Cayman GT4 Clubsport	969	(Germany) Thorsten Jung	1–4, 9
(Belgium) Mühlner Motorsport	Porsche 718 Cayman GT4 Clubsport	969	(Germany) Fidel Leib	1–4
(Belgium) Mühlner Motorsport	Porsche 718 Cayman GT4 Clubsport	969	(Germany) Peter Terting	7
(Belgium) Mühlner Motorsport	Porsche 718 Cayman GT4 Clubsport	969	(Italy) Gabriele Piana	9
(Belgium) Mühlner Motorsport	Porsche 718 Cayman GT4 Clubsport	979	(Germany) Moritz Kranz	All
(Belgium) Mühlner Motorsport	Porsche 718 Cayman GT4 Clubsport	979	(Germany) Nico Menzel	All
(Belgium) Mühlner Motorsport	Porsche 718 Cayman GT4 Clubsport	979	(Germany) Michael Rebhan	1–2, 4
(Belgium) Mühlner Motorsport	Porsche 718 Cayman GT4 Clubsport	979	(Germany) Thorsten Jung	5–8
(Belgium) Mühlner Motorsport	Porsche 718 Cayman GT4 Clubsport	979	(Germany) Fidel Leib	5
(Germany) MKR-Engineering	Porsche Cayman GT4 Clubsport MR	976	(Germany) Maximilian Bernau	3
(Germany) MKR-Engineering	Porsche Cayman GT4 Clubsport MR	976	(Germany) Thomas Bernau	3
(Germany) MKR-Engineering	Porsche Cayman GT4 Clubsport MR	976	(Switzerland) Viktor Schyrba	3
(Germany) MKR-Engineering	Porsche Cayman GT4 Clubsport MR	976	(Switzerland) Benedikt Frei	3

== Race results ==
Results indicates overall winner only in the whole race.

Rnd	Circuit	Pole position	Winners
1	(Germany) Nürburgring Nordschleife	No. 98 (Germany) Rowe Racing	No. 99 (Germany) Rowe Racing
1	(Germany) Nürburgring Nordschleife	(United Kingdom) Tom Blomqvist (Denmark) Mikkel Jensen (United States) Connor De Phillippi	(Netherlands) Nicky Catsburg (United States) John Edwards (Germany) Marco Wittmann
2	(Germany) Nürburgring Nordschleife	No. 29 (Germany) Audi Sport Team Land	Cancelled due to snowfall
2	(Germany) Nürburgring Nordschleife	(Germany) Christopher Mies (Germany) René Rast	Cancelled due to snowfall
3	(Germany) Nürburgring Nordschleife	No. 911 (Germany) Manthey Racing	No. 912 (Germany) Manthey Racing
3	(Germany) Nürburgring Nordschleife	(France) Kévin Estre (Denmark) Michael Christensen	(Austria) Richard Lietz (United Kingdom) Nick Tandy
4	(Germany) Nürburgring Nordschleife	No. 34 (Germany) Walkenhorst Motorsport	No. 6 (Germany) Black Falcon
4	(Germany) Nürburgring Nordschleife	(Norway) Christian Krognes (United Kingdom) David Pittard (United Kingdom) Jody Fannin	(Germany) Patrick Assenheimer (Switzerland) Manuel Metzger
5	(Germany) Nürburgring Nordschleife	No. 6 (Germany) Black Falcon	No. 6 (Germany) Black Falcon
5	(Germany) Nürburgring Nordschleife	(Germany) Patrick Assenheimer (Germany) Maro Engel	(Germany) Patrick Assenheimer (Germany) Maro Engel
6	(Germany) Nürburgring Nordschleife	No. 5 (Germany) Phoenix Racing	No. 6 (Germany) Black Falcon
6	(Germany) Nürburgring Nordschleife	(Germany) Vincent Kolb (Luxembourg) Steve Jans (Germany) Frank Stippler	(Germany) Patrick Assenheimer (Switzerland) Manuel Metzger
7	(Germany) Nürburgring Nordschleife	No. 23 (Germany) GetSpeed Performance	No. 2 (Germany) GetSpeed Performance
7	(Germany) Nürburgring Nordschleife	(United States) John Shoffner (United States) Janine Hill (Germany) Fabian Schiller	(Austria) Dominik Baumann (Germany) Fabian Schiller
8	(Germany) Nürburgring Nordschleife	No. 34 (Germany) Walkenhorst Motorsport	No. 48 (Germany) Mann Filter
8	(Germany) Nürburgring Nordschleife	(Norway) Christian Krognes (United Kingdom) David Pittard (United Kingdom) Jody Fannin	(Germany) Maximilian Buhk (Italy) Raffaele Marciello
9	(Germany) Nürburgring Nordschleife	No. 16 (Germany) Black Falcon	No. 6 (Germany) Black Falcon
9	(Germany) Nürburgring Nordschleife	(Germany) Hubert Haupt (United Kingdom) Adam Christodoulou (Germany) Dirk Müller	(Germany) Patrick Assenheimer (Germany) Maro Engel

== See also ==
- 2019 24 Hours of Nürburgring

== Bibliography ==
- Hasso Jacoby, Patrik Koziolek & Egon Zeimers. Grüne Hölle 2018-2019: Die Langstreckenrennen auf dem Nürburgring (in German). Deutscher Sportfahrer Kreis Service und Betriebs GmbH.
