= Nick Foster (Australian racing driver) =

Australian racing driver (born 1993)

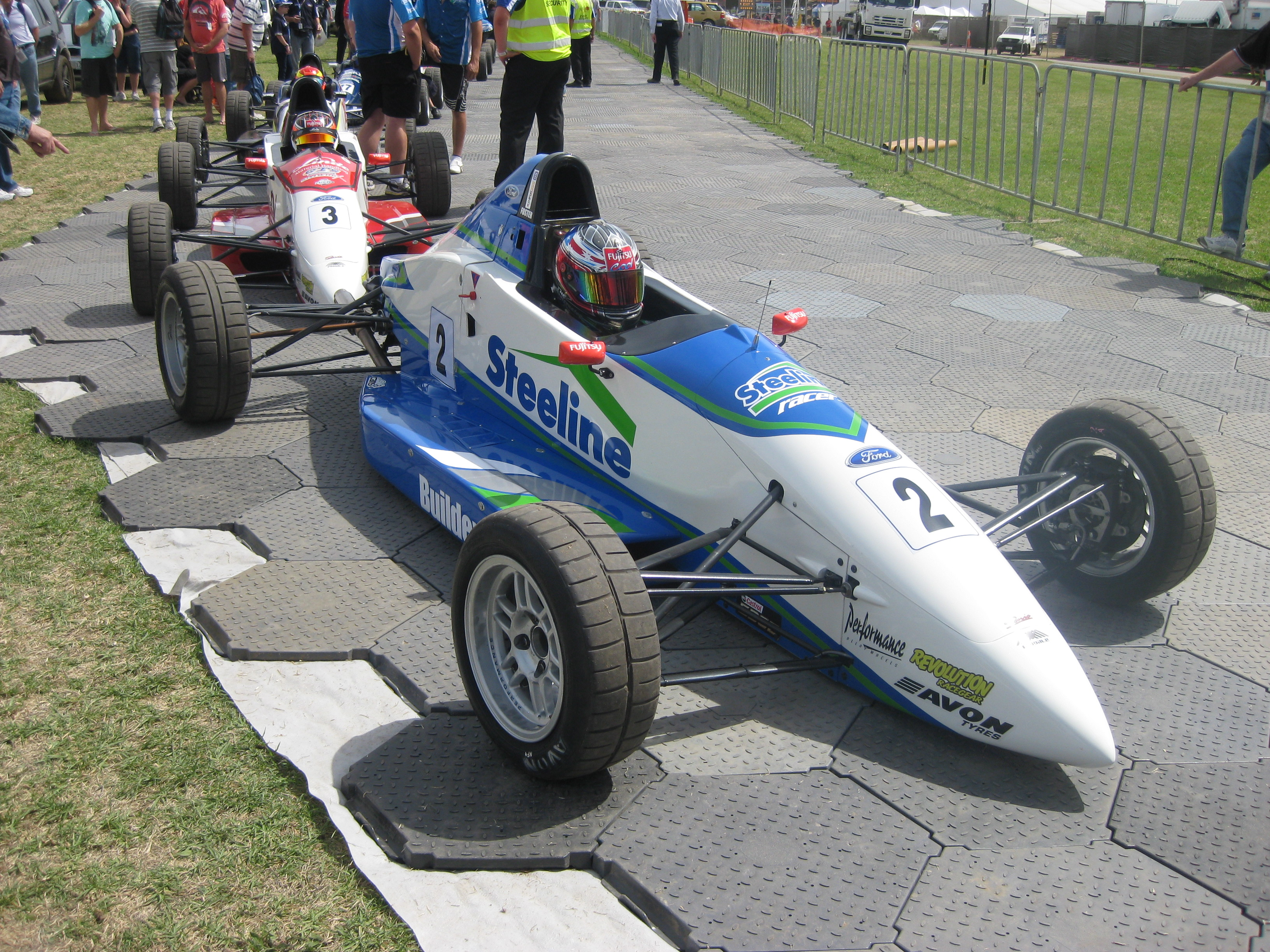
- Foster in 2011
- Nationality: (Australia) Australian
- Born: 13 February 1993 (age 33) Brisbane, Australia
- Categorisation: FIA Silver (until 2018, 2027–); FIA Gold (2019–2026)

Championship titles
- 2022 2015: GT World Challenge Asia – GT3 Silver; Porsche Carrera Cup Australia – Pro

Nicholas Foster (born 13 February 1993) is an Australian racing driver who last competed in the 24H Series for Prime Speed Sport. He has competed in such categories as LMP2, LM GTE and GT3, most notably winning the IGTC's California 8 Hours in 2019.

== Career ==
Foster made his car racing debut in 2007, racing in the Queensland Raceway Race Car Series. Following two uneventful seasons in the Australian Formula Ford Championship in 2008 and 2009, Foster returned to the series the following year, as he joined Sonic Motor Racing Services for his third season in the series. Scoring three wins across the Queensland and Symmons Plains rounds, as well as taking seven more podiums, Foster secured a third-place points finish at season's end. During 2010, he also made a one-off appearance in the Formula 3 Australian Drivers' Championship for Astuti Motorsport.

After starting 2011 by scoring two podiums in the Toyota Racing Series for Giles Motorsport, Foster returned to the Australian Formula Ford Championship for the rest of the year. In his final year in the series, Foster scored five wins and seven more podiums to end the year third in points for the second year in a row. Switching to Porsche Carrera Cup Australia and Team BRM for the following year, taking a lone podium at Adelaide en route to a sixth-place points finish in the Pro standings. Foster then briefly returned to single-seaters, racing in the Formula 3 Australian Drivers' Championship in 2013, scoring two wins at Hidden Valley and taking seven more podiums to finish third in points.

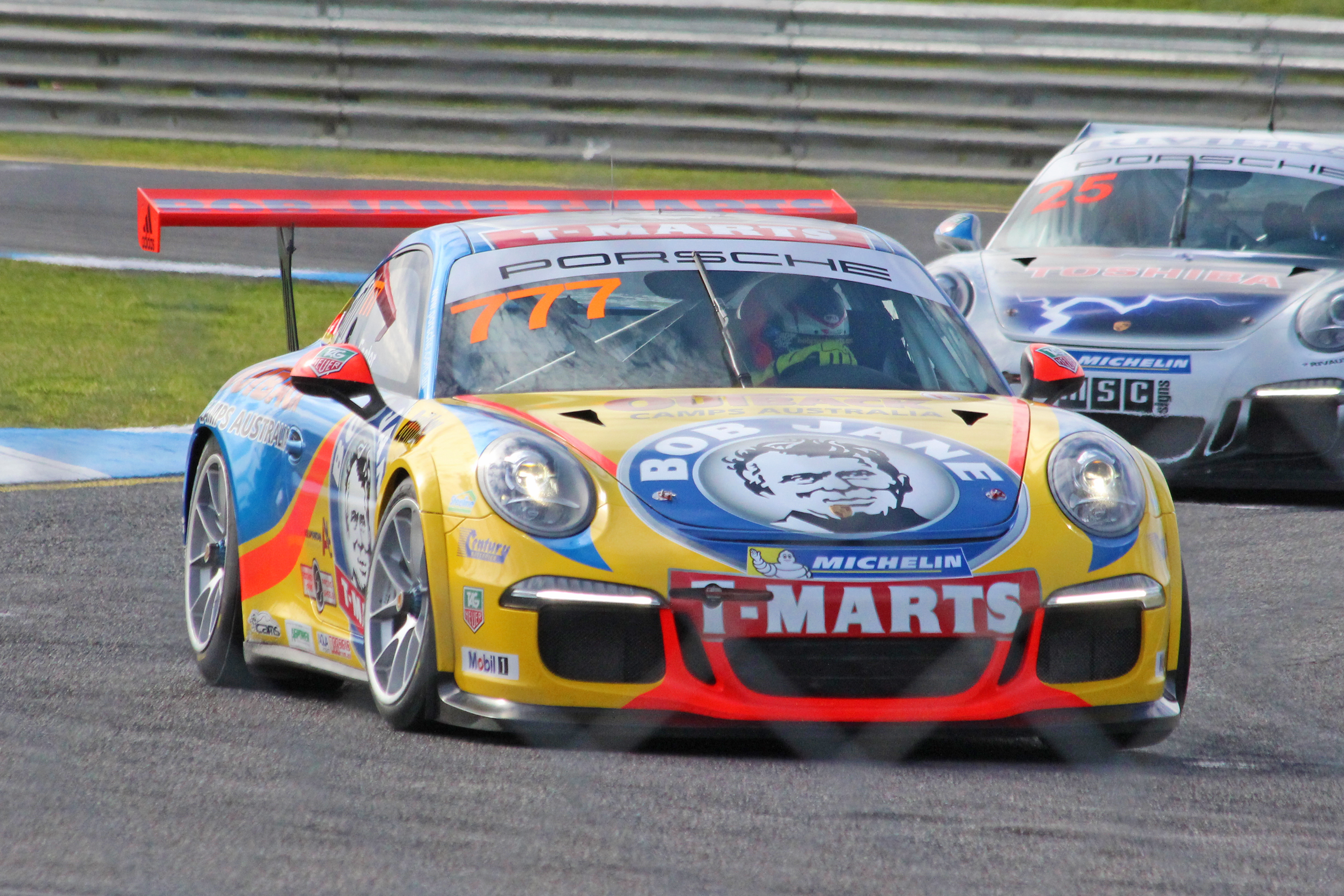
Foster racing in Carrera Cup at Sandown in 2015.

Foster reunited with Sonic Motor Racing Services to race in Porsche Carrera Cup Australia the following year, winning both races at Surfers Paradise to end the year fifth in the Pro class standings. Returning to the team and series for 2015, Foster took eight wins and a further six podiums to clinch the Pro class title. Continuing in Carrera Cup competition the following year, Foster moved to Germany to race in Porsche Carrera Cup Germany for KÜS Team 75 Bernhard. Racing with the team through the first six rounds, Foster scored podiums at Oschersleben and Lausitzring, before switching to Konrad Motorsport for the final two rounds and ending the year fifth in points with another podium at the Nürburgring.

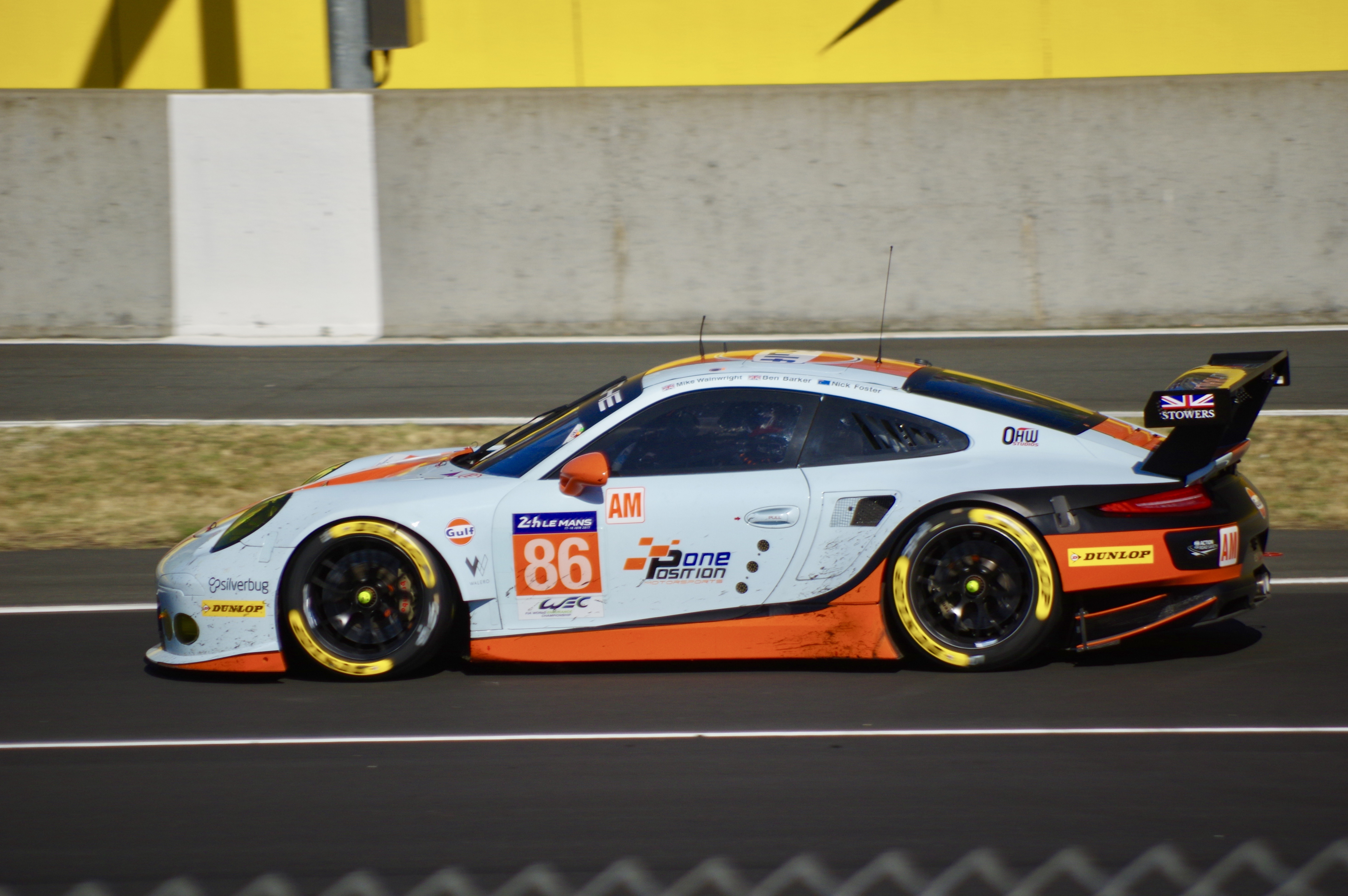
Foster's Gulf Racing Porsche at Le Mans in 2017.

In 2017, Foster joined Porsche-fielding Gulf Racing to race in the LMGTE Am class of the FIA World Endurance Championship alongside Ben Barker and Michael Wainwright. In his only season in the series, Foster scored a best result of second at the 6 Hours of Shanghai and also finished third at the 6 Hours of Mexico en route to a sixth-place points finish. During 2017, Foster also raced part-time in Blancpain GT Series Asia for Craft-Bamboo Racing, scoring a best result of second at both Suzuka and Fuji as he ended the year 13th in the overall and eighth in the Silver Cup standings. Returning to the latter series for 2018, Foster joined Ferrari-fielding HubAuto Racing, taking wins at Shanghai and Ningbo as he secured runner-up spots in both the overall and Silver Cup standings. During 2018, Foster also raced with the same team at the Suzuka 10 Hours, taking the overall pole position in qualifying and finishing second in Pro-Am in the race.

Remaining with HubAuto Racing for 2019, Foster raced with them in all but one rounds of the Intercontinental GT Challenge, taking a lone win at the California 8 Hours and finishing 18th in points. During 2019, Foster also raced in all but one race of the Blancpain GT Series Endurance Cup for Audi-affiliated Attempto Racing, as well as finishing runner-up at the Gulf 12 Hours for the same team in December. At the end of the year, Foster raced in the 2019–20 Asian Le Mans Series for Eurasia Motorsport in the LMP2 class, finishing second in the first three races to end the year third in points.

The following year, Foster was set to compete with Optimum Motorsport in both the British GT Championship and the GT World Challenge Europe Endurance Cup, but both deals fell through due to the pandemic. During 2020, Foster raced with Eurasia Motorsport at the 24 Hours of Le Mans and the 6 Hours of Spa-Francorchamps. Foster also raced at the Berlin rounds of the 2019–20 Jaguar I-Pace eTrophy, as well as making one-off appearances in the GT World Challenge Europe Sprint Cup and International GT Open with SPS Automotive Performance. In 2021, Foster made a one-off appearance in the Nürburgring Langstrecken-Serie for Hella Pagid - racing one at the NLS8.

Foster returned to GT World Challenge Asia for 2022, joining Mercedes-fielding Triple Eight JMR alongside Prince Jefri Ibrahim. In his second full-time season in the series, Foster took overall wins at Sepang and Fuji,, as well as one other Pro-Am class win, as he missed out on the overall title by three points, and clinched the Pro-Am title by five points. During 2022, Foster also raced for the team in a one-off appearance in GT World Challenge Australia at Adelaide, as well as racing in the 24 Hours of Nürburgring for Hella Pagid - racing one. Following that, Foster raced for Prime Speed Sport in the GT class of the 2024–25 Asian Le Mans Series, as well as making a one-off appearance in the 2025 24H Series for the same team at the 12 Hours of Paul Ricard.

== Karting record ==
=== Karting career summary ===
| Season | Series | Team | Position |
|---|---|---|---|
| 2005 | Australian National Sprint Kart Championship — Junior National Light | | 15th |
| 2005 | Australian National Sprint Kart Championship — Junior Club | | 14th |
| 2006 | Australian National Sprint Kart Championship — Junior National Light | | 8th |
| 2006 | Queensland Superkart Championship | | 19th |
| 2007 | Australian National Sprint Kart Championship — Junior National Light | | 1st |
| 2007 | CIK Trophy of New Zealand – ICA-J | | 2nd |

== Racing record ==
=== Racing career summary ===
| Season | Series | Team | Races | Wins | Poles | F/Laps | Podiums | Points | Position |
|---|---|---|---|---|---|---|---|---|---|
| 2007 | Queensland Raceway Race Car Series | | 12 | 4 | 0 | 3 | 7 | 36 | 9th |
| 2008 | Australian Formula Ford Championship | Steeline Metal Framing Systems | 22 | 0 | 0 | 0 | 0 | 13 | 22nd |
| 2008 | Queensland Raceway Race Car Series | | 6 | 1 | 0 | 0 | 5 | 82 | 6th |
| 2008 | Queensland Formula Ford Championship | | 6 | 2 | 1 | 0 | 5 | 95 | 5th |
| 2009 | Australian Formula Ford Championship | BF Racing | 22 | 0 | 0 | 0 | 0 | 13 | 22nd |
| 2009 | Queensland Racing Car Championship | | 2 | 0 | 0 | 0 | 0 | 4 | 16th |
| 2010 | Australian Formula Ford Championship | Sonic Motor Racing Services | 22 | 3 | 1 | 3 | 10 | 263 | **3rd** |
| 2010 | Victorian State Formula Ford Fiesta Championship | Sonic Motor Racing Services | 3 | 0 | 1 | 0 | 2 | 90 | 13th |
| 2010 | Formula 3 Australian Drivers' Championship – Gold Star | Astuti Motorsport | 3 | 0 | 0 | 0 | 0 | 3 | 22nd |
| 2011 | Toyota Racing Series | Giles Motorsport | 15 | 0 | 2 | 0 | 2 | 510 | 10th |
| 2011 | Australian Formula Ford Championship | Sonic Motor Racing Services | 22 | 5 | 2 | 3 | 12 | 251 | **3rd** |
| 2011 | New South Wales Formula Ford Fiesta Championship | Sonic Motor Racing Services | 2 | 0 | 1 | 0 | 0 | 0 | NC |
| 2011 | Porsche Carrera Cup Australia | Porsche Cars Australia | 3 | 0 | 0 | 0 | 0 | 0 | NC |
| 2012 | Porsche Carrera Cup Australia – Pro | Team BRM | 24 | 0 | 1 | 0 | 1 | 641 | 6th |
| 2012 | Formula 3 Australian Drivers' Championship – Gold Star | Team BRM | 3 | 0 | 0 | 0 | 3 | 28 | 12th |
| 2013 | Formula 3 Australian Drivers' Championship – Gold Star | Team BRM | 20 | 2 | 2 | 7 | 9 | 150 | **3rd** |
| 2014 | Porsche Carrera Cup Australia – Pro | Sonic Motor Racing Services | 22 | 2 | 1 | 1 | 10 | 767 | 5th |
| 2015 | Porsche Carrera Cup Australia – Pro | Sonic Motor Racing Services | 20 | 8 | 6 | 5 | 14 | 956 | **1st** |
| 2015 | Porsche Carrera Cup Italy | Martinet Team Pro GT | 1 | 0 | 0 | 0 | 0 | 0 | NC† |
| 2016 | Bathurst 12 Hour – B | Team NZ Motorsport | 1 | 0 | 0 | 0 | 1 | —N/a | **3rd** |
| 2016 | Porsche Carrera Cup Germany | KÜS Team 75 Bernhard | 12 | 0 | 0 | 0 | 3 | 186 | 5th |
| 2016 | Porsche Carrera Cup Germany | Konrad Motorsport | 4 | 0 | 0 | 0 | 1 | 186 | 5th |
| 2017 | FIA World Endurance Championship – LMGTE Am | Gulf Racing | 9 | 0 | 0 | 0 | 2 | 97 | 6th |
| 2017 | 24 Hours of Le Mans – LMGTE Am | Gulf Racing | 1 | 0 | 0 | 0 | 0 | —N/a | 10th |
| 2017 | Blancpain GT Series Asia – GT3 Silver | Craft-Bamboo Racing | 6 | 0 | 1 | 0 | 2 | 62 | 8th |
| 2017 | Porsche Carrera Cup Australia – Challenge | DNA Racing | 2 | 0 | 0 | 0 | 0 | 0 | NC |
| 2017 | Asian Le Mans Sprint Cup – GT Cup | Team NZ Motorsport | | | | | | | |
| 2017 | Gulf 12 Hours – GT Pro-Am | Kessel Racing TP12 HubAuto | 1 | 0 | 0 | 0 | 1 | —N/a | **3rd** |
| 2018 | 24H GT Series – 991 | race:pro motorsport | 1 | 0 | 0 | 0 | 1 | 28 | NC |
| 2018 | Blancpain GT Series Asia – GT3 Silver | HubAuto Corsa | 12 | 3 | 4 | 4 | 7 | 183 | **2nd** |
| 2018 | Suzuka 10 Hours – Pro-Am | HubAuto Corsa | 1 | 0 | 1 | 0 | 1 | —N/a | **2nd** |
| 2018 | Gulf 12 Hours – GT3 Pro | Attempto Racing | 1 | 0 | 0 | 0 | 0 | —N/a | DNF |
| 2019 | Blancpain GT World Challenge Europe | Attempto Racing | 10 | 0 | 0 | 0 | 1 | 13.5 | 14th |
| 2019 | 24H GT Series – A6 | Attempto Racing | 1 | 0 | 0 | 0 | 0 | 0 | NC |
| 2019 | 24H GT Series – A6 | Toksport WRT | 1 | 0 | 0 | 0 | 0 | 0 | NC |
| 2019 | Intercontinental GT Challenge | HubAuto Corsa | 4 | 1 | 0 | 0 | 1 | 25 | 18th |
| 2019 | Blancpain GT Series Endurance Cup | HubAuto Corsa | 1 | 0 | 0 | 0 | 0 | 11 | 21st |
| 2019 | Blancpain GT Series Endurance Cup | Attempto Racing | 4 | 0 | 0 | 0 | 0 | 11 | 21st |
| 2019 | Gulf 12 Hours – GT3 Pro | Attempto Racing | 1 | 0 | 0 | 0 | 1 | —N/a | **2nd** |
| 2019 | VLN Series – Cup 5 | Pixum Team Adrenalin Motorsport | 1 | 0 | 0 | 0 | 0 | 0 | NC |
| 2019–20 | Asian Le Mans Series – LMP2 | Eurasia Motorsport | 4 | 0 | 1 | 0 | 3 | 65 | **3rd** |
| 2019–20 | FIA World Endurance Championship – LMP2 | Eurasia Motorsport | 1 | 0 | 0 | 0 | 0 | 0 | NC† |
| 2019–20 | Jaguar I-Pace eTrophy – Pro | Jaguar China Racing | 7 | 0 | 0 | 0 | 1 | 49 | 5th |
| 2020 | Australian GT Championship – Pro-Am | Triple Eight Race Engineering | 1 | 0 | 0 | 0 | 0 | 8 | **2nd** |
| 2020 | 24 Hours of Le Mans – LMP2 | Eurasia Motorsport | 1 | 0 | 0 | 0 | 0 | —N/a | 14th |
| 2020 | GT World Challenge Europe Sprint Cup – Pro-Am | SPS Automotive Performance | 2 | 0 | 1 | 1 | 2 | 20 | 7th |
| 2020 | International GT Open – Pro-Am | SPS Automotive Performance | 2 | 0 | 1 | 1 | 2 | 14 | 9th |
| 2021 | Nürburgring Langstrecken-Serie – SP9 Pro-Am | Hella Pagid - racing one | 1 | 0 | 0 | 0 | 0 | 0 | NC |
| 2022 | GT World Challenge Asia – GT3 Silver | Triple Eight JMR | 10 | 3 | 0 | 1 | 6 | 158 | **1st** |
| 2022 | 24 Hours of Nürburgring – SP9 Pro-Am | Hella Pagid - racing one | 1 | 0 | 0 | 0 | 0 | —N/a | DNF |
| 2022 | GT World Challenge Australia – GT3 Pro-Am | JMR Triple Eight Race Engineering | 3 | 0 | 0 | 0 | 0 | 0 | NC |
| 2024–25 | Asian Le Mans Series – GT | Prime Speed Sport | 6 | 0 | 0 | 0 | 0 | 2 | 23rd |
| 2025 | 24H Series – GT3 Pro-Am | Prime Speed Sport | 1 | 0 | 0 | 0 | 0 | 18 | NC |

=== Complete Toyota Racing Series results ===
(key) (Races in bold indicate pole position) (Races in italics indicate fastest lap)

| Year | Entrant | 1 | 2 | 3 | 4 | 5 | 6 | 7 | 8 | 9 | 10 | 11 | 12 | 13 | 14 | 15 | DC | Points |
|---|---|---|---|---|---|---|---|---|---|---|---|---|---|---|---|---|---|---|
| 2011 | Giles Motorsport | TER; 1; 5 | TER; 2; 9 | TER; 3 Ret | TIM; 1; 7 | TIM; 2; 10 | TIM; 3 Ret | **HMP**; **1** Ret | HMP; 2; 13 | **HMP**; **3**; 13 | MAN; 1; 5 | MAN; 2; 14 | MAN; 3; 5 | TAU; 1; 2 | TAU; 2; 3 | TAU; 3; 5 | 10th | 510 |

=== Complete FIA World Endurance Championship results ===
(key) (Races in bold indicate pole position) (Races in italics indicate fastest lap)

| Year | Entrant | Class | Car | Engine | 1 | 2 | 3 | 4 | 5 | 6 | 7 | 8 | 9 | Rank | Points |
|---|---|---|---|---|---|---|---|---|---|---|---|---|---|---|---|
| 2017 | Gulf Racing | LMGTE Am | Porsche 911 RSR | Porsche 4.0 L Flat-6 | SIL; 4 | SPA; Ret | LMS; 5 | NÜR; 5 | MEX; 3 | COA; Ret | FUJ; 4 | SHA; 2 | BHR; 5 | 6th | 97 |

=== Complete 24 Hours of Le Mans results ===
| Year | Team | Co-Drivers | Car | Class | Laps | Pos. | Class Pos. |
|---|---|---|---|---|---|---|---|
| 2017 | (United Kingdom) Gulf Racing UK | (United Kingdom) Ben Barker (United Kingdom) Michael Wainwright | Porsche 911 RSR | LMGTE Am | 328 | 38th | 10th |
| 2020 | (Philippines) Eurasia Motorsport | (Spain) Roberto Merhi (Japan) Nobuya Yamanaka | Ligier JS P217-Gibson | LMP2 | 351 | 18th | 14th |

=== Complete GT World Challenge Asia results ===
(key) (Races in bold indicate pole position) (Races in italics indicate fastest lap)

| Year | Team | Car | Class | 1 | 2 | 3 | 4 | 5 | 6 | 7 | 8 | 9 | 10 | 11 | 12 | DC | Pts |
|---|---|---|---|---|---|---|---|---|---|---|---|---|---|---|---|---|---|
| 2017 | Craft-Bamboo Racing | Porsche 911 GT3 R | GT3 Silver | SEP; 1 | SEP; 2 | BUR; 1 | BUR; 2 | SUZ; 1; 2 | SUZ; 2; 8 | **FUJ**; **1**; 2 | FUJ; 2; 11 | SHA; 1 Ret | SHA; 2; 9 | ZHE; 1 | ZHE; 2 | 8th | 62 |
| 2018 | HubAuto Corsa | Ferrari 488 GT3 | GT3 Silver | SEP; 1; 4 | SEP; 2; 5 | BUR; 1; 2 | **BUR**; **2**; 6 | SUZ; 1; 4 | **SUZ**; **2**; 15 | FUJ; 1; 2 | **FUJ**; **2**; 7 | SHA; 1; 1 | SHA; 2; 7 | ZHE; 1; 1 | **ZHE**; **2**; 10 | 2nd | 183 |
| 2022 | Triple Eight JMR | Mercedes-AMG GT3 Evo | GT3 Pro-Am | SEP; 1; 1 | SEP; 2; 5 | SUZ; 1; 3 | SUZ; 2; 2 | FUJ; 1; 4 | FUJ; 2; 1 | SUG; 1; 9 | SUG; 2; 10 | OKA; 1; 3 | OKA; 2; 13 | | | 1st | 158 |

=== Complete GT World Challenge Europe results ===
==== GT World Challenge Europe Endurance Cup ====
(key) (Races in bold indicate pole position) (Races in italics indicate fastest lap)

| Year | Team | Car | Class | 1 | 2 | 3 | 4 | 5 | 6 | 7 | Pos. | Points |
|---|---|---|---|---|---|---|---|---|---|---|---|---|
| 2019 | Attempto Racing | Audi R8 LMS Evo | Pro | MNZ; 7 | SIL; Ret | LEC; 8 | | | | CAT; 10 | 24th | 10 |
| 2019 | HubAuto Racing | Ferrari 488 GT3 | Pro | | | | SPA; 6H; 69 | SPA; 12H; 69 | SPA; 24H; Ret | | 24th | 10 |

==== GT World Challenge Europe Sprint Cup ====
(key) (Races in bold indicate pole position) (Races in italics indicate fastest lap)

| Year | Team | Car | Class | 1 | 2 | 3 | 4 | 5 | 6 | 7 | 8 | 9 | 10 | Pos. | Points |
|---|---|---|---|---|---|---|---|---|---|---|---|---|---|---|---|
| 2019 | Attempto Racing | Audi R8 LMS Evo | Pro | BRH; 1 Ret | BRH; 2; 3 | MIS; 1; 8 | MIS; 2; 8 | ZAN; 1; 12 | ZAN; 2; 13 | NÜR; 1; 14 | NÜR; 2; 13 | HUN; 1; 11 | HUN; 2; 13 | 14th | 13.5 |
| 2020 | SPS Automotive Performance | Mercedes-AMG GT3 Evo | Pro-Am | MIS; 1 | MIS; 2 | MIS; 3 | MAG; 1 | MAG; 2 | ZAN; 1; 14 | **ZAN**; **2**; 18 | CAT; 1 | CAT; 2 | CAT; 3 | 7th | 20 |

=== Complete Asian Le Mans Series results ===
(key) (Races in bold indicate pole position; results in italics indicate fastest lap)

| Year | Entrant | Class | Chassis | Engine | 1 | 2 | 3 | 4 | 5 | 6 | Rank | Points |
|---|---|---|---|---|---|---|---|---|---|---|---|---|
| 2019-20 | Eurasia Motorsport | LMP2 | Ligier JS P217 | Gibson GK428 4.2 L V8 | **SHA**; 2 | BEN; 2 | SEP; 2 | CHA; 5 | | | 3rd | 65 |
| 2024–25 | Prime Speed Sport | GT | Lamborghini Huracán GT3 Evo 2 | Lamborghini DGF 5.2 L V10 | SEP; 1; 19 | SEP; 2 Ret | DUB; 1; 21 | DUB; 2 Ret | ABU; 1; 11 | ABU; 2 Ret | 23rd | 2 |
