= 2012 Australian Formula Ford Championship =

Motor racing competition

Seasons
- ← 2011 2013 →

The 2012 Australian Formula Ford Championship was a CAMS sanctioned national motor racing title for drivers of Formula Ford racing cars. It was the 43rd national series for Formula Fords to be held in Australia and the 20th to carry the Australian Formula Ford Championship name. The championship was contested over an eight-round series which began on 16 March at the Melbourne Grand Prix Circuit and ended on 18 November at Winton Motor Raceway. Australian Formula Ford Management Pty. Ltd. was appointed as the Category Manager by CAMS for the series, which was officially known as the "2012 Australian Formula Ford Championship for the Ford Fiesta Cup".

The championship was won by Jack Le Brocq driving a Mygale SJ12A for the CAMS Rising Stars / Minda Motorsport team.

== Teams and drivers ==
The following teams and drivers contested the 2012 Australian Formula Ford Championship. All teams and drivers were Australian-registered.

Team	Chassis	No	Driver
Sonic Motor Racing Services	Mygale SJ12A	2	Garry Jacobson
Sonic Motor Racing Services	Mygale SJ11A	3	Rhett Noonan
Sonic Motor Racing Services	Mygale SJ08A	4	Anton de Pasquale
Sonic Motor Racing Services	Mygale SJ08A	21	Anton de Pasquale
Anglo Motorsport	Mygale SJ10A	6	Jonathan Venter
Borland Racing Developments	Spectrum 014	7	Shae Davies
Borland Racing Developments	Spectrum 012	19	Ash Quiddington
Borland Racing Developments	Spectrum 012	44	Scott Andrews
Synergy Motorsport	Spectrum 014	10	Scott Andrews
Synergy Motorsport	Spectrum 014	10	Liam Sager
Synergy Motorsport	Spectrum 012	22	Matt Campbell
Synergy Motorsport	Spectrum 014	27	Sam Power
Synergy Motorsport	Spectrum 014	62	Mathew Hart
Evans Motorsport Group	Mygale SJ10A	12	Liam Sager
Evans Motorsport Group	Mygale SJ10A	48	Jake Fouracre
Evans Motorsport Group	Mygale SJ06A	88	Greg Holloway
CAMS Rising Stars; Minda Motorsport	Mygale SJ11A	14	Macauley Jones
CAMS Rising Stars; Minda Motorsport	Mygale SJ12A	49	Jack Le Brocq
CAMS Rising Stars; Minda Motorsport	Mygale SJ11A	96	David Sera
Super Charge Batteries	Spectrum 011b	17	Luke Fraser
Crabtrees Real Estate	Mygale SJ07A	20	Gavin Dumas
Richter Racing	Spectrum 011b	21	Dylan Richter
Team BRM	Mygale SJ12A	30	Tom Goess
Team BRM	Mygale SJ09A	32	Jon Mills
Team BRM	Mygale SJ11A	41	Simon Hodge
Team BRM	Mygale SJ12A	41	Simon Hodge
State Fleet Services	Spectrum 011c	36	Matthew Roesler
BF Racing	Mygale SJ11A	94	Jordan Lloyd

All cars were fitted with a 1600cc Ford Duratec engine, as required by the regulations.

== Calendar ==
The championship was contested over an eight-round series with three races per round. All races were held in Australia.

Round	Circuit	Date	Round winner	Car
1	Melbourne Grand Prix Circuit	15–18 March	Jack Le Brocq	Mygale SJ12A
2	Symmons Plains Raceway	30 March–1 April	Garry Jacobson	Mygale SJ12A
3	Phillip Island Grand Prix Circuit	18–20 May	Jack Le Brocq	Mygale SJ12A
4	Townsville Street Circuit	6–8 July	Jack Le Brocq	Mygale SJ12A
5	Queensland Raceway	3–5 August	Mathew Hart	Spectrum 014
6	Sandown Raceway	14–16 September	Garry Jacobson	Mygale SJ12A
7	Mount Panorama Circuit, Bathurst	4–7 October	Jack Le Brocq	Mygale SJ12A
8	Winton Motor Raceway	16–18 November	Anton de Pasquale	Mygale SJ08A

== Points system ==
Championship points were awarded on a 20–16–14–12–10–8–6–4–2–1 basis to the top ten classified finishers in each race. An additional point was awarded to the driver gaining pole position for the first race at each round.

== Results ==
Pos.	Driver	(Victoria (state)) MEL			(Tasmania) SYM			(Victoria (state)) PHI			(Queensland) TOW			(Queensland) QUE			(Victoria (state)) SAN			(New South Wales) BAT			(Victoria (state)) WIN			Pen.	Pts
Pos.	Driver	R1	R2	R3	R1	R2	R3	R1	R2	R3	R1	R2	R3	R1	R2	R3	R1	R2	R3	R1	R2	R3	R1	R2	R3	Pen.	Pts
1	Jack Le Brocq	1	2	1	4	4	5	3	1	1	1	1	1	2	2	3	3	1	2	1	1	1	4	2	2		406
2	Mathew Hart	2	1	5	2	2	2	1	5	2	7	Ret	2	1	1	1	2	4	Ret	2	7	2	2	4	4		330
3	Garry Jacobson	3	3	2	1	1	4	2	4	3	Ret	DNS	DNS	4	3	2	1	2	1	DNS	DNS	DNS					239
4	Shae Davies	DNS	Ret	Ret	3	3	1	5	2	5	Ret	Ret	5	3	4	4	4	3	3	DNS	DNS	DNS	5	5	5		202
5	Macauley Jones	7	Ret	12	10	Ret	8	4	6	4	3	5	Ret	Ret	5	5	8	6	5	9	5	4	3	3	3		173
6	Sam Power	Ret	5	4	7	Ret	7	9	7	Ret	4	2	4	Ret	6	6	9	7	7	3	2	5	9	8	6	-5	159
7	Anton de Pasquale							7	9	8				5	Ret	Ret	5	8	4	5	3	3	1	1	1		157
8	Simon Hodge	6	7	8	9	Ret	DNS	10	8	6	2	3	3	9	7	8	7	10	11	8	Ret	9	Ret	10	Ret	-10	91
9	Jonathan Venter	4	4	3							5	4	8							4	11	7					82
10	Liam Sager	8	Ret	6	6	6	3													10	4	6				−5	58
11	Rhett Noonan	11	Ret	9	8	7	9	6	11	10	Ret	6	Ret	8	Ret	9	11	9	9	12	10	11	7	7	8	−5	53
12	Matt Campbell										6	7	6	6	Ret	12				6	9	10					41
13	Tom Goess	Ret	8	11	5	5	6																				32
14	Scott Andrews	9	6	7				8	3	7																−10	30
15	Trent Harrison																6	5	6								26
16	Luke Marquis																						6	6	7		22
=	David Sera							Ret	10	9				10	12	7	10	11	8	11	6	8				−5	22
18	Jordan Lloyd													7	9	10				7	8	Ret					18
19	Jake Fouracre	5	9	13																							12
20	Greg Holloway	Ret	11	14							DNS	8	7														10
21	Hamish Hardeman																12	Ret	10				8	12	11		5
21	Jayden Wallis																						10	9	9		5
23	Dylan Richter	10	10	Ret										11	10	Ret				14	14	13					2
24	Ash Quiddington	Ret	Ret	10										Ret	8	11							11	11	10	−5	−1
–	Gavin Dumas	Ret	12	15																							0
–	Jon Mills	12	Ret	16																							0
–	Luke Fraser													Ret	11	13											0
–	Sam Breen																13	12	12								0
–	William Hall																DNS	13	13	13	12	12					0
–	Matthew Roesler																			15	13	14					0
Pos.	Driver	R1	R2	R3	R1	R2	R3	R1	R2	R3	R1	R2	R3	R1	R2	R3	R1	R2	R3	R1	R2	R3	R1	R2	R3	Pen.	Pts
Pos.	Driver	(Victoria (state)) MEL			(Tasmania) SYM			(Victoria (state)) PHI			(Queensland) TOW			(Queensland) QUE			(Victoria (state)) SAN			(New South Wales) BAT			(Victoria (state)) WIN			Pen.	Pts

Colour	Result
Gold	Winner
Silver	Second place
Bronze	Third place
Green	Points classification
Blue	Non-points classification
Blue	Non-classified finish (NC)
Purple	Retired, not classified (Ret)
Red	Did not qualify (DNQ)
Red	Did not pre-qualify (DNPQ)
Black	Disqualified (DSQ)
White	Did not start (DNS)
White	Withdrew (WD)
White	Race cancelled (C)
Blank	Did not practice (DNP)
Blank	Did not arrive (DNA)
Blank	Excluded (EX)

Note: The driver who attained pole position for race one of the round is indicated by bold font applied to his race one result.
