= 2010 Australian Formula Ford Championship =

Motor racing competition

Seasons
- ← 2009 2011 →

The 2010 Australian Formula Ford Championship was a CAMS sanctioned national motor racing title for drivers of Formula Ford open wheel racing cars. It was the 41st national series for Formula Fords to be held in Australia and the 18th to carry the Australian Formula Ford Championship name. The championship, which was promoted as the "2010 Genuine Ford Parts Australian Formula Ford Championship", began on 26 March 2010 at the Albert Park Street Circuit and ended on 21 November at Sandown Raceway after eight rounds. Australian Formula Ford Management Pty. Ltd. was appointed by CAMS as the Category Manager for the Championship.

Synergy Motorsport Spectrum driver Chaz Mostert won the title with a dominant season performance. The Queensland driver secured the title at Round 7 and won a total of five rounds during the series. Individual race wins were achieved by Mostert (14), Nick Foster (3), Ashley Walsh (2), Ryan Simpson (2) and Geoff Uhrhane (1).

== Teams and drivers ==
The following teams and drivers competed in the championship. All teams and drivers were Australian-registered, excepting New Zealanders Nick Cassidy, Martin Short and Ben Barker, who was British-registered.

Team	Chassis	No	Driver	Rounds
Sonic Motor Racing Services	Mygale SJ10a	2	(Australia) Geoff Uhrhane	All
Sonic Motor Racing Services	Mygale SJ10a	7	(Australia) Josh Hunter	8
Sonic Motor Racing Services	Mygale SJ10a	11	(Australia) Cam Waters	
Sonic Motor Racing Services	Mygale SJ10a	13	(Australia) Nick Foster	All
Sonic Motor Racing Services	Mygale SJ10a	16	(Australia) Ryan Simpson	1–5
Borland Racing Developments	Spectrum 011c	4	(Australia) Andrew McFarland	1–2
Borland Racing Developments	Spectrum 012	45	(Australia) Ashley Walsh	All
Borland Racing Developments	Spectrum 012	76	(Australia) Ben Jurczak	2–8
Borland Racing Developments	Spectrum 011b	77	(Australia) Caleb Rayner	All
simPRO; Master Electricians Racing	Mygale SJ10a	5	(Australia) Andre Borell	All
Evans Motorsport Group	Mygale SJ10A	6	(Australia) Adam Graham	1–4
Evans Motorsport Group	Mygale SJ10A	6	(New Zealand) Nick Cassidy	5
Evans Motorsport Group	Mygale SJ10A	6	(Australia) Trent Harrison	6–8
Evans Motorsport Group	Mygale SJ11A	94	(Australia) Matthew Hart	7–8
Brad Jones Racing	Mygale SJ09a	8	(Australia) Tom Williamson	All
Brad Jones Racing	Mygale SJ09a	9	(Australia) Zac Schonberger	2–5
Linde Material Handling	Mygale SJ06a	11	(Australia) Cam Waters	
CAMS Rising Stars; Minda Motorsport	Spectrum 011b	12	(Australia) Liam Sager	3–6
CAMS Rising Stars; Minda Motorsport	Spectrum 011c	49	(Australia) Jack Le Brocq	All
CAMS Rising Stars; Minda Motorsport	Spectrum 011b	55	(Australia) Garry Jacobson	1–2, 4, 6–7
CAMS Rising Stars; Minda Motorsport	Spectrum 011d	83	(Australia) Matthew Brabham	All
Synergy Motorsport	Spectrum 012	15	(Australia) Chaz Mostert	All
Synergy Motorsport	Spectrum 011b	17	(Australia) Stefan Borsato	4–5
Synergy Motorsport	Spectrum 011c	22	(Australia) Shae Davies	
Synergy Motorsport	Spectrum 011	25	(Australia) Daniel Cotton	1
Synergy Motorsport	Spectrum 012	71	(Australia) Nathan Morcom	All
G-Force Events; Crabtrees Real Estate	Mygale SJ07a	20	(Australia) Greg Woodrow	1
Shae Davies Racing; BF Racing	Van Diemen RF06	22	(Australia) Shae Davies	
Howard Racing	Spectrum 011	27; 35	(Australia) Sam Howard	4–6
Howard Racing	Mygale SJ08a; Spectrum 011	37	(Australia) Jack Howard	5–6
Team BRM	Mygale SJ09a	30	(Australia) Tom Goess	All
Team BRM	Mygale SJ09a	31	(New Zealand) Martin Short	1–4
Team BRM	Mygale SJ09a	31	(United Kingdom) Ben Barker	5
Team BRM	Mygale SJ09a	32	(Australia) Jon Mills	1–2, 4–7
HMT Racing	Spectrum 011d	33	(Australia) Robert Hackwood	1, 6
Rob Spence Motorsport	Spectrum 011c	35	(Australia) Cameron Spence	1, 3
Widex Australia	Mygale SJ07a	47	(Australia) Williams Vass	1
McDonald's Chelsea Heights	Spectrum 011d	66	(Australia) Jesse Fenech	3, 8
Marshalls & Dent Lawyers	Spectrum 011b	74	(Australia) Nick McBride	1, 3
Speco/VHT; Motor Improvements	Spectrum 011	78	(Australia) Brendan Jones	1
TanderSport	Stealth S3D	91	(Australia) Pete Major	8

Note: All cars were powered by 1600cc Ford Duratec engines, as mandated by the championship regulations.

== Calendar ==
Round	Circuit	Date	Round winner
1	Albert Park Street Circuit	28–29 March	Chaz Mostert
2	Queensland Raceway	1–2 May	Nicholas Foster
3	Winton Motor Raceway	14–16 May	Ashley Walsh
4	Hidden Valley Raceway	18–20 June	Chaz Mostert
5	Townsville Street Circuit	9–11 July	Chaz Mostert
6	Surfers Paradise Street Circuit	22–24 October	Chaz Mostert
7	Symmons Plains Raceway	13–14 November	Geoff Uhrhane
8	Sandown Raceway	19–21 November	Chaz Mostert

Note: Rounds were contested over three races, with the exception of Round 1 which was staged over two races.

== Season summary ==
Rd	Race	Circuit	Pole position	Fastest lap	Winning driver	Winning team
1	1	(Victoria (state)) Albert Park Circuit	(Australia) Chaz Mostert	(Australia) Chaz Mostert	(Australia) Chaz Mostert	Synergy Motorsport
2	1	Queensland Raceway	(Australia) Ryan Simpson	(Australia) Ryan Simpson	(Australia) Ryan Simpson	Sonic Motor Racing Services
2	2	Queensland Raceway		(Australia) Chaz Mostert	(Australia) Nick Foster	Sonic Motor Racing Services
2	3	Queensland Raceway		(Australia) Ben Jurczak	(Australia) Nick Foster	Sonic Motor Racing Services
3	1	(New South Wales) Winton Motor Raceway	(Australia) Nick Foster	(Australia) Ashley Walsh	(Australia) Chaz Mostert	Synergy Motorsport
3	2	(New South Wales) Winton Motor Raceway		(Australia) Chaz Mostert	(Australia) Ashley Walsh	Borland Racing Developments
3	3	(New South Wales) Winton Motor Raceway		(Australia) Nick Foster	(Australia) Ashley Walsh	Borland Racing Developments
4	1	(Northern Territory) Hidden Valley Raceway	(Australia) Ryan Simpson	(Australia) Ryan Simpson	(Australia) Chaz Mostert	Synergy Motorsport
4	2	(Northern Territory) Hidden Valley Raceway		(Australia) Chaz Mostert	(Australia) Chaz Mostert	Synergy Motorsport
4	3	(Northern Territory) Hidden Valley Raceway		(Australia) Chaz Mostert	(Australia) Ryan Simpson	Sonic Motor Racing Services
5	1	(Queensland) Reid Park Street Circuit	(Australia) Ryan Simpson	(Australia) Chaz Mostert	(Australia) Chaz Mostert	Synergy Motorsport
5	2	(Queensland) Reid Park Street Circuit		(Australia) Ashley Walsh	(Australia) Chaz Mostert	Synergy Motorsport
5	3	(Queensland) Reid Park Street Circuit		(Australia) Chaz Mostert	(Australia) Chaz Mostert	Synergy Motorsport
6	1	(Queensland) Surfers Paradise Street Circuit	(Australia) Chaz Mostert	(Australia) Chaz Mostert	(Australia) Chaz Mostert	Synergy Motorsport
6	2	(Queensland) Surfers Paradise Street Circuit		(Australia) Cam Waters	(Australia) Chaz Mostert	Synergy Motorsport
6	3	(Queensland) Surfers Paradise Street Circuit		(Australia) Chaz Mostert	(Australia) Chaz Mostert	Synergy Motorsport
7	1	(Tasmania) Symmons Plains Raceway	(Australia) Ashley Walsh	(Australia) Ben Jurczak	(Australia) Chaz Mostert	Synergy Motorsport
7	2	(Tasmania) Symmons Plains Raceway		(Australia) Nick Foster	(Australia) Geoff Uhrhane	Sonic Motor Racing Services
7	3	(Tasmania) Symmons Plains Raceway		(Australia) Nick Foster	(Australia) Nick Foster	Sonic Motor Racing Services
8	1	(Victoria (state)) Sandown Raceway	(Australia) Chaz Mostert	(Australia) Cam Waters	(Australia) Chaz Mostert	Synergy Motorsport
8	2	(Victoria (state)) Sandown Raceway		(Australia) Chaz Mostert	(Australia) Chaz Mostert	Synergy Motorsport
8	3	(Victoria (state)) Sandown Raceway		(Australia) Ben Jurczak	(Australia) Chaz Mostert	Synergy Motorsport

== Points ==
Championship points were awarded on a 20–16–14–12–10–8–6–4–2–1 basis to the top ten classified finishers in each race. An additional point was awarded to the driver gaining pole position for the first race at each round.

== Results ==
Pos.	Driver	(Victoria (state)) ALB	(Queensland) QUE			(New South Wales) WIN			(Northern Territory) DAR			(Queensland) TOW			(Queensland) SUR			(Tasmania) SYM			(Victoria (state)) SAN			Pen	Pts
Pos.	Driver	R1	R1	R2	R3	R1	R2	R3	R1	R2	R3	R1	R2	R3	R1	R2	R3	R1	R2	R3	R1	R2	R3	Pen	Pts
1	(Australia) Chaz Mostert	1	2	16	4	1	2	3	1	1	5	1	1	1	1	1	1	1	12	5	1	1	1		361
2	(Australia) Geoff Uhrhane	7	3	2	Ret	4	3	2	2	2	3	3	Ret	8	4	3	3	3	1	2	2	4	3	-5	269
3	(Australia) Nick Foster	2	9	1	1	3	4	4	4	3	4	2	Ret	Ret	7	2	4	8	2	1	4	3	4		263
4	(Australia) Ashley Walsh	4	8	4	Ret	2	1	1	5	6	2	5	2	2	3	Ret	Ret	2	Ret	3	5	2	2	-15	232
5	(Australia) Ryan Simpson	3	1	19	6	5	5	6	3	4	1	4	3	4										-5	150
6	(Australia) Cam Waters	Ret	10	13	9	9	9	9	11	Ret	11	7	4	5	2	6	2	5	3	Ret	Ret	7	6		115
7	(Australia) Adam Graham	6	4	7	2	6	6	5	6	5	7														92
8	(Australia) Tom Williamson	11	Ret	8	8	Ret	16	11	17	7	6	Ret	16	6	6	Ret	7	6	7	8	3	5	9		88
9	(Australia) Trent Harrison														5	4	5	4	4	4	Ret	11	8		72
10	(Australia) Nathan Morcom	5	7	6	6	11	11	10	12	8	Ret	Ret	Ret	Ret	Ret	Ret	Ret	7	6	7	Ret	9	13		59
11	(Australia) Ben Jurczak		5	3	3	10	11	Ret	Ret	10	Ret	14	Ret	Ret	12	Ret	13	13	10	Ret	7	10	5	-5	53
12	(Australia) Andre Borell	8	6	5	5	15	15	12	7	13	Ret	11	9	13	8	9	16	14	8	10	12	15	15		51
13	(Australia) Jack Le Brocq	9	11	Ret	11	16	17	16	8	9	10	6	5	15	10	5	6	10	Ret	9	Ret	14	Ret		49
14	(Australia) Matthew Brabham	16	15	9	Ret	7	7	7	Ret	16	Ret	13	10	Ret	15	10	8	16	11	11	8	19	Ret		30
15	(New Zealand) Nick Cassidy											8	6	3											26
16	(Australia) Jesse Fenech					13	14	13													6	6	7		22
17	(Australia) Caleb Rayner	13	Ret	12	10	12	8	Ret	13	17	12	12	7	7	Ret	DNS	11	12	9	DNS	9	8	10	-5	21
18	(Australia) Matthew Hart																	9	5	6	11	12	11		20
19	(New Zealand) Martin Short	Ret	17	10	18	8	10	8	9	12	9														14
20	(Australia) Tom Goess	18	13	15	15	Ret	20	15	15	11	8	10	8	9	Ret	11	15	15	14	12	10	13	12		12
21	(Australia) Shae Davies		12	17	14										11	7	9	11	Ret	DNS	DNS	16	14		8
22	(Australia) Garry Jacobson	10	14	11	16				Ret	14	13				9	8	Ret	Ret	13	13					7
	(Australia) Cameron Spence	12				18	19	17																	0
	(Australia) Andrew McFarland	14	Ret	14	12																				0
	(Australia) Jack Howard											16	14	Ret	14	Ret	12								0
	(Australia) Zac Schonberger		16	20	13	19	21	18	16	18	16	18	17	11											0
	(Australia) Daniel Cotton	17																							0
	(Australia) Stefan Borsato								14	19	15	15	15	12											0
	(Australia) Jon Mills	21	18	18	17				18	20	17	19	18	Ret	14	15	Ret	Ret	15	14					0
	(Australia) Josh Hunter																				Ret	17	16		0
	(Australia) Brendan Jones	19																							0
	(United Kingdom) Ben Barker											DNS	11	Ret											0
	(Australia) Robert Hackwood	20													13	16	17								0
	(Australia) Pete Major																				13	18	DNS		0
	(Australia) Williams Vass	22																							0
	(Australia) Greg Woodrow	Ret																							0
23	(Australia) Liam Sager					14	12	14	Ret	15	Ret	9	13	14	Ret	13	10							-5	-2
24	(Australia) Sam Howard								10	Ret	14	17	12	10	Ret	12	14							-5	-3
=	(Australia) Nick McBride	15				17	18	19																-5	-3
Pos.	Driver	(Victoria (state)) ALB	(Queensland) QUE			(New South Wales) WIN			(Northern Territory) DAR			(Queensland) TOW			(Queensland) SUR			(Tasmania) SYM			(Victoria (state)) SAN			Pen	Pts
Pos.	Driver	R1	R1	R2	R3	R1	R2	R3	R1	R2	R3	R1	R2	R3	R1	R2	R3	R1	R2	R3	R1	R2	R3	Pen	Pts

Colour	Result
Gold	Winner
Silver	Second place
Bronze	Third place
Green	Points classification
Blue	Non-points classification
Blue	Non-classified finish (NC)
Purple	Retired, not classified (Ret)
Red	Did not qualify (DNQ)
Red	Did not pre-qualify (DNPQ)
Black	Disqualified (DSQ)
White	Did not start (DNS)
White	Withdrew (WD)
White	Race cancelled (C)
Blank	Did not practice (DNP)
Blank	Did not arrive (DNA)
Blank	Excluded (EX)

Note: Race 2 at the Albert Park Street Circuit, was stopped due to a serious crash on lap 2 involving Caleb Rayner. The race was abandoned and no championship points were awarded.
