= 2009 Australian Formula Ford Championship =

Motor racing competition

Seasons
- ← 2008 2010 →

The 2009 Genuine Ford Parts Australian Formula Ford Championship was a CAMS sanctioned national motor racing title for drivers of Formula Ford open wheel racing cars. The championship was the 40th national series for Formula Fords to be held in Australia and the 17th to carry the Australian Formula Ford Championship name. It began on 26 March 2009 at the Albert Park Street Circuit and finished on 25 October at the Surfers Paradise Street Circuit after eight rounds held across four different states and territories. Round 1 was contested over two races and all other rounds over three races.

South Australian driver Nick Percat dominated the championship, winning 12 of the 23 races. At the Hidden Valley Raceway round, Percat set a new record for the most races wins in the history of national level Formula Ford racing in Australia.

== Points ==
Championship points were awarded on a 20-16-14-12-10-8-6-4-2-1 basis to the top ten classified finishers in each race. An additional point was awarded to the driver gaining pole position for each round.

== Teams and drivers ==
The following teams and drivers competed in the 2009 Australian Formula Ford Championship.

Team	Chassis	No	Driver	Rounds
Sonic Motor Racing Services	Mygale SJ07A	2	(Australia) Nick Percat	All
Sonic Motor Racing Services	Mygale SJ07A	3	(New Zealand) Mitch Evans	All
Sonic Motor Racing Services	Mygale SJ09A	4	(Australia) Geoff Uhrhane	All
Borland Racing Developments	Spectrum 011c	5	(Australia) Luke Ellery	All
Borland Racing Developments	Spectrum 011d	19	(Australia) Scott Pye	All
Borland Racing Developments	Spectrum 011d	71	(Australia) Nathan Morcom	All
Evans Motorsport	Mygale SJ08A	6	(Australia) Trent Harrison	1, 5, 7
TSR Racing	Mygale SJ07A	7	(New Zealand) Martin Short	1–2, 5–7
Minda Motorsport	Spectrum 011b	8	(Australia) Tom Tweedie	5
Minda Motorsport	Spectrum 011b	10	(Australia) Jesse Dixon	1–4, 6
Minda Motorsport	Spectrum 011b	10	(Australia) Bryce Moore	
Minda Motorsport	Van Diemen RF06	24	(Australia) James Crozier	1
Minda Motorsport	Spectrum 011c	25	(Australia) Ben Walter	All
Minda Motorsport	Spectrum 011	48	(New Zealand) Andrew Waite	1
Minda Motorsport	Spectrum 011b	74	(Australia) Nicholas McBride	All
Synergy Motorsport	Spectrum 011c	9	(Australia) Nick Simmons	All
Synergy Motorsport	Spectrum 011b	15	(Australia) Chaz Mostert	All
Synergy Motorsport	Spectrum 011c	16	(Australia) Ryan Simpson	All
The Cosmetic Medicine Centre	Van Diemen RF06	11	(Australia) Roman Krumins	6
BF Racing	Mygale SJ08A	13	(Australia) Nick Foster	1–2, 6, 8
Anglo Australian Motorsport	Comtec Spirit WL06	14	(Australia) Nicholas Tanti	1–2
Brad Jones Racing	Mygale SJ09A	14	(Australia) Tom Williamson	7
Team BRM	Mygale SJ09A	20	(New Zealand) Richie Stanaway	1–5, 8
Team BRM	Mygale SJ09A	20	(New Zealand) Martin Short	
Team BRM	Mygale SJ09A	21	(Australia) Ben Small	1–2
Team BRM	Mygale SJ09A	21	(Australia) John Magro	8
Team BRM	Mygale SJ09A	22	(Australia) Jordan Skinner	1–3, 5–6
Team BRM	Mygale SJ09A	22	(United Kingdom) Joey Foster	4
Team BRM	Mygale SJ09A	22	(Australia) Andrew McFarland	7
Monza Motors-Mygale	Mygale SJ08A	30	(Australia) Trent Harrison	1, 5, 7
National Surgical	Van Diemen RF04	32	(Australia) Jon Mills	1–2, 4, 6
Berklee Australia	Van Diemen RF06	44	(Australia) Roger I'Anson	1
Muzz Buzz	Spectrum 011d	45	(Australia) Ashley Walsh	7–8
Mygale Australia	Mygale SJ08A	46	(Australia) Andrew Beams	1
James Mann	Van Diemen RF04	51	(Australia) James Mann	8
Refrigerated Rental & Sales	Spectrum 011c	63	(Australia) Martin Swindells	1–2, 6, 8
King's Fibreglass	Spectrum 011b	77	(Australia) Caleb Rayner	5, 7
Master Electricians Racing	Van Diemen RF06	87	(Australia) Andre Borell	1–6, 8
Listec Racing	Listec Wil013	95	(Australia) Glenn Welch	5
Activity Playgrounds	Spectrum 011b	98	(Australia) Jake Chapman	1

== Calendar ==
Round	Circuit	Dates	Supporting	Map
1	(New South Wales) Albert Park Circuit	28–29 March	Australian Grand Prix; V8 Supercar Championship Series	2009 Australian Formula Ford Championship is located in Australia
2	(New South Wales) Winton Motor Raceway	2–3 May	V8 Supercar Championship Series; Fujitsu V8 Supercar Series	2009 Australian Formula Ford Championship is located in Australia
3	(Tasmania) Symmons Plains Raceway	31 May	V8 Supercar Championship Series	2009 Australian Formula Ford Championship is located in Australia
4	(Northern Territory) Hidden Valley Raceway	19 June	V8 Supercar Championship Series	2009 Australian Formula Ford Championship is located in Australia
5	(Victoria (state)) Sandown Raceway	2 August	V8 Supercar Championship Series; Fujitsu V8 Supercar Series	2009 Australian Formula Ford Championship is located in Australia
6	Queensland Raceway	23 August	V8 Supercar Championship Series; Fujitsu V8 Supercar Series	2009 Australian Formula Ford Championship is located in Australia
7	(Victoria (state)) Phillip Island Grand Prix Circuit	13 September	V8 Supercar Championship Series	2009 Australian Formula Ford Championship is located in Australia
8	(Queensland) Surfers Paradise Street Circuit	23–25 October	V8 Supercar Championship Series	2009 Australian Formula Ford Championship is located in Australia

== Season summary ==
Rd	Race	Circuit	Pole position	Fastest lap	Winning driver	Winning team
1	1	(Victoria (state)) Albert Park Circuit	(Australia) Nick Percat	(Australia) Nick Percat	(Australia) Nick Percat	Sonic Motor Racing Services
1	2	(Victoria (state)) Albert Park Circuit		(Australia) Nick Percat	(Australia) Nick Percat	Sonic Motor Racing Services
2	1	(New South Wales) Winton Motor Raceway	(Australia) Nick Percat	(Australia) Nick Percat	(Australia) Nick Percat	Sonic Motor Racing Services
2	2	(New South Wales) Winton Motor Raceway		(Australia) Nick Percat	(Australia) Nick Percat	Sonic Motor Racing Services
2	3	(New South Wales) Winton Motor Raceway		(Australia) Nick Percat	(Australia) Nick Percat	Sonic Motor Racing Services
3	1	(Tasmania) Symmons Plains Raceway	(Australia) Chaz Mostert	(New Zealand) Richie Stanaway	(Australia) Nick Percat	Sonic Motor Racing Services
3	2	(Tasmania) Symmons Plains Raceway		(New Zealand) Richie Stanaway	(Australia) Nick Percat	Sonic Motor Racing Services
3	3	(Tasmania) Symmons Plains Raceway		(Australia) Nick Percat	(New Zealand) Richie Stanaway	Team BRM
4	1	(Northern Territory) Hidden Valley Raceway	(Australia) Nick Percat	(New Zealand) Mitch Evans	(Australia) Nick Percat	Sonic Motor Racing Services
4	2	(Northern Territory) Hidden Valley Raceway		(Australia) Ryan Simpson	(Australia) Nick Percat	Sonic Motor Racing Services
4	3	(Northern Territory) Hidden Valley Raceway		(Australia) Nick Percat	(Australia) Nick Percat	Sonic Motor Racing Services
5	1	(Victoria (state)) Sandown Raceway	(Australia) Chaz Mostert	(New Zealand) Mitch Evans	(New Zealand) Mitch Evans	Sonic Motor Racing Services
5	2	(Victoria (state)) Sandown Raceway		(Australia) Chaz Mostert	(Australia) Scott Pye	Borland Racing Developments
5	3	(Victoria (state)) Sandown Raceway		(New Zealand) Mitch Evans	(Australia) Scott Pye	Borland Racing Developments
6	1	Queensland Raceway	(New Zealand) Mitch Evans	(New Zealand) Mitch Evans	(New Zealand) Mitch Evans	Sonic Motor Racing Services
6	2	Queensland Raceway		(New Zealand) Mitch Evans	(New Zealand) Mitch Evans	Sonic Motor Racing Services
6	3	Queensland Raceway		(Australia) Ryan Simpson	(New Zealand) Mitch Evans	Sonic Motor Racing Services
7	1	(Victoria (state)) Phillip Island Grand Prix Circuit	(New Zealand) Mitch Evans	(Australia) Nick Percat	(Australia) Nick Percat	Sonic Motor Racing Services
7	2	(Victoria (state)) Phillip Island Grand Prix Circuit		(Australia) Luke Ellery	(Australia) Nick Percat	Sonic Motor Racing Services
7	3	(Victoria (state)) Phillip Island Grand Prix Circuit		(Australia) Nick Percat	(Australia) Chaz Mostert	Synergy Motorsport
8	1	(Queensland) Surfers Paradise Street Circuit	(New Zealand) Mitch Evans	(New Zealand) Mitch Evans	(New Zealand) Mitch Evans	Sonic Motor Racing Services
8	2	(Queensland) Surfers Paradise Street Circuit		(Australia) Ryan Simpson	(New Zealand) Mitch Evans	Sonic Motor Racing Services
8	3	(Queensland) Surfers Paradise Street Circuit		(Australia) Nick Foster	(Australia) Ashley Walsh	Muzz Buzz

== Championship standings ==
Pos.	Driver	(Victoria (state)) ALB		(New South Wales) WIN			(Tasmania) SYM			(Northern Territory) DAR			(Victoria (state)) SAN			(Queensland) QUE			(Victoria (state)) PHI			(Queensland) SUR			Pen	Pts
Pos.	Driver	R1	R2	R1	R2	R3	R1	R2	R3	R1	R2	R3	R1	R2	R3	R1	R2	R3	R1	R2	R3	R1	R2	R3	Pen	Pts
1	(Australia) Nick Percat	1	1	1	1	1	1	1	3	1	1	1	2	3	3	3	2	2	1	1	11	5	6	2	-12	369
2	(New Zealand) Mitch Evans	2	2	5	3	3	7	5	9	2	2	2	1	Ret	6	1	1	1	2	2	6	1	1	15	-10	297
3	(Australia) Scott Pye	6	4	4	4	4	2	3	2	5	4	4	5	1	1	9	4	3	3	7	5	3	4	11		270
4	(Australia) Chaz Mostert	3	3	2	2	2	DSQ	7	5	3	6	5	Ret	2	2	4	17	5	4	4	1	Ret	Ret	10		225
5	(Australia) Ryan Simpson	7	8	9	8	8	4	4	4	6	3	3	9	6	4	6	7	4	6	6	Ret	8	5	6		178
6	(New Zealand) Richie Stanaway	4	6	13	6	5	3	2	1	4	5	6	3	11	14							2	2	5	-10	164
7	(Australia) Geoff Uhrhane	22	12	3	7	6	10	9	6	12	8	7	11	5	5	2	3	16	5	11	8	6	7	3		141
8	(Australia) Ben Walter	Ret	DNS	6	5	7	5	6	Ret	10	12	Ret	7	13	9	5	5	9	7	14	Ret	11	9	7		88
9	(Australia) Luke Ellery	11	9	10	9	9	9	12	8	9	7	9	Ret	9	Ret	7	Ret	Ret	8	8	2	14	8	4		75
10	(Australia) Trent Harrison	8	Ret										4	4	7				Ret	5	3					58
11	(Australia) Ashley Walsh																		Ret	Ret	9	4	3	1		48
12	(Australia) Nick Simmons	12	11	19	15	18	Ret	11	7	8	9	10	13	7	Ret	Ret	8	6	10	Ret	Ret	7	Ret	16		41
13	(Australia) Nathan Morcom	16	17	11	13	Ret	6	8	Ret	11	Ret	12	Ret	8	13	13	14	10	9	10	4	10	Ret	17		34
14	(New Zealand) Martin Short	9	5	15	12	Ret							8	17	10	8	6	15	14	Ret	DNS					29
15	(Australia) Tom Williamson																		12	3	7					20
16	(Australia) Nicholas McBride	19	14	7	Ret	13	8	10	12	14	11	Ret	6	Ret	Ret	Ret	12	12	13	12	Ret	13	11	13		19
17	(Australia) Jake Chapman	5	7																							16
18	(Australia) Martin Swindells	13	10	12	10	10										Ret	9	7				Ret	Ret	DNS		11
18	(Australia) Nick Foster	15	19	8	Ret	15										14	11	13				9	10	8		11
20	(Australia) Caleb Rayner												14	10	8				15	9	Ret					7
21	(Australia) Andre Borell	17	Ret	18	17	16	11	14	Ret	15	Ret	Ret	15	16	11	10	10	8				Ret	13	12		6
22	(Australia) Jesse Dixon	14	16	16	14	12	Ret	13	10	13	10	11				11	DSQ	11								3
23	(Australia) James Mann																					12	11	9		2
24	(Australia) Roger I'Anson	10	18																							1
24	(Australia) Jordan Skinner	18	21	17	16	17	12	15	11				10	15	12	12	14	Ret								1
24	(Australia) Andrew McFarland																		16	15	10					1
-	(Australia) Glenn Welch												12	12	Ret											0
-	(Australia) Ben Small	Ret	20	14	11	11																				0
-	(Australia) Jon Mills	21	Ret	20	18	19				16	13	13				15	Ret	14								0
-	(Australia) John Magro																					Ret	13	14		0
-	(Australia) Tom Tweedie												16	14	Ret											0
-	(Australia) Nicholas Tanti	Ret	DNS	21	DNS	14																				0
-	(New Zealand) Andrew Waite	Ret	15																							0
-	(Australia) Roman Krumins															16	16	Ret								0
-	(Australia) James Crozier	20	22																							0
-	(Australia) Andrew Beams	Ret	DNS																							0
guest drivers ineligible for championship points
-	(United Kingdom) Joey Foster									7	Ret	8														
Pos.	Driver	(Victoria (state)) ALB		(New South Wales) WIN			(Tasmania) SYM			(Northern Territory) DAR			(Victoria (state)) SAN			(Queensland) QUE			(Victoria (state)) PHI			(Queensland) SUR			Pen	Pts
Pos.	Driver	R1	R2	R1	R2	R3	R1	R2	R3	R1	R2	R3	R1	R2	R3	R1	R2	R3	R1	R2	R3	R1	R2	R3	Pen	Pts

Colour	Result
Gold	Winner
Silver	Second place
Bronze	Third place
Green	Points classification
Blue	Non-points classification
Blue	Non-classified finish (NC)
Purple	Retired, not classified (Ret)
Red	Did not qualify (DNQ)
Red	Did not pre-qualify (DNPQ)
Black	Disqualified (DSQ)
White	Did not start (DNS)
White	Withdrew (WD)
White	Race cancelled (C)
Blank	Did not practice (DNP)
Blank	Did not arrive (DNA)
Blank	Excluded (EX)
