= Garry Jacobson =

Australian racing driver

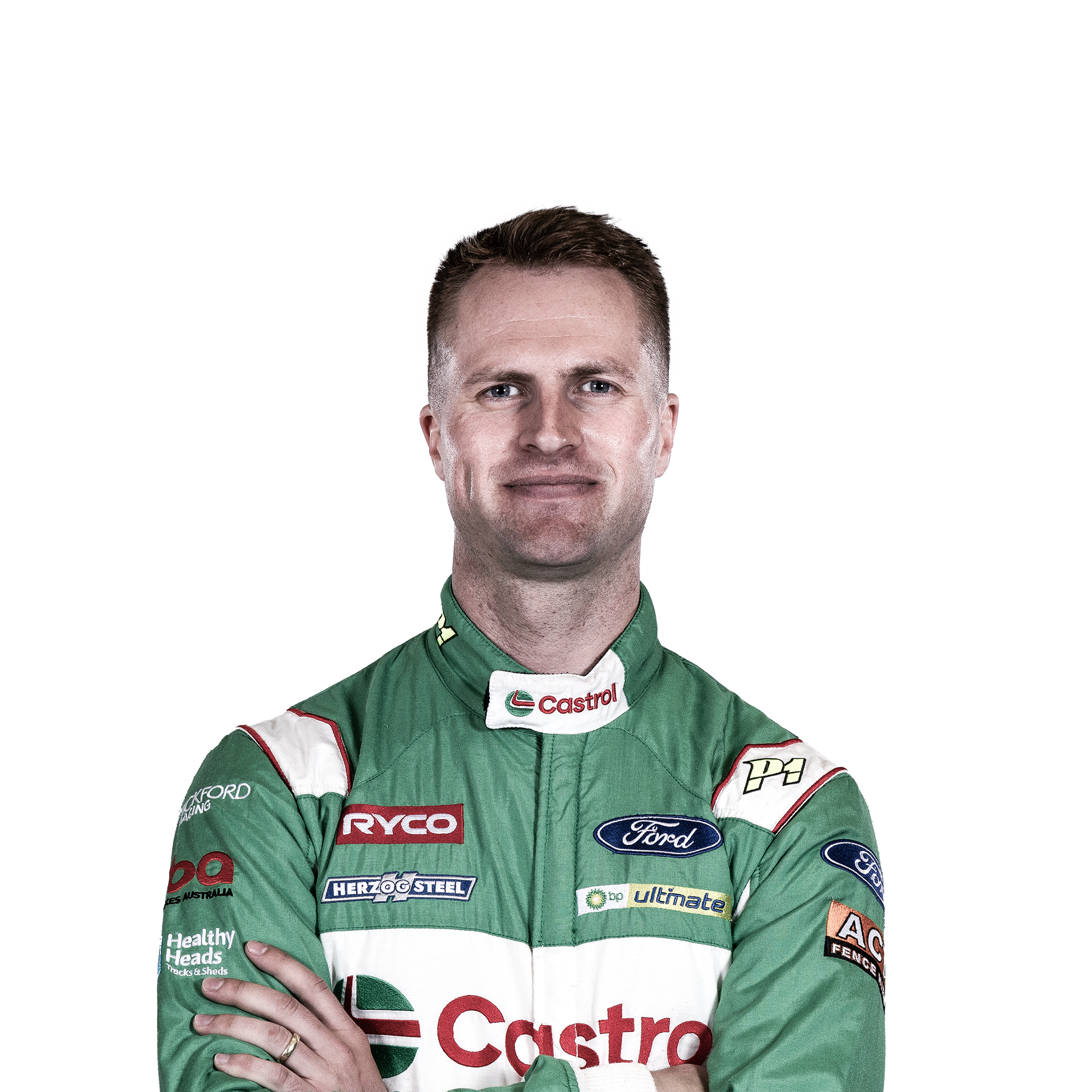
- Garry Jacobson in 2023
- Nationality: Australian
- Born: Garry William Eric Jacobson; 28 February 1992 (age 34) Shepparton, Victoria

Supercars Championship career
- Current team: Tickford Racing (Endurance race co-driver)
- Championships: 0
- Races: 116
- Wins: 0
- Podiums: 0
- Pole positions: 0
- 2021 position: 22nd (1003 pts)

Garry William Eric Jacobson (born 28 February 1992 in Shepparton, Australia) is a former motor racing driver from Australia. He previously competed in the Supercars Championship for Kelly Racing, Matt Stone Racing, Tekno Autosports and PremiAir Racing.

== Biography ==
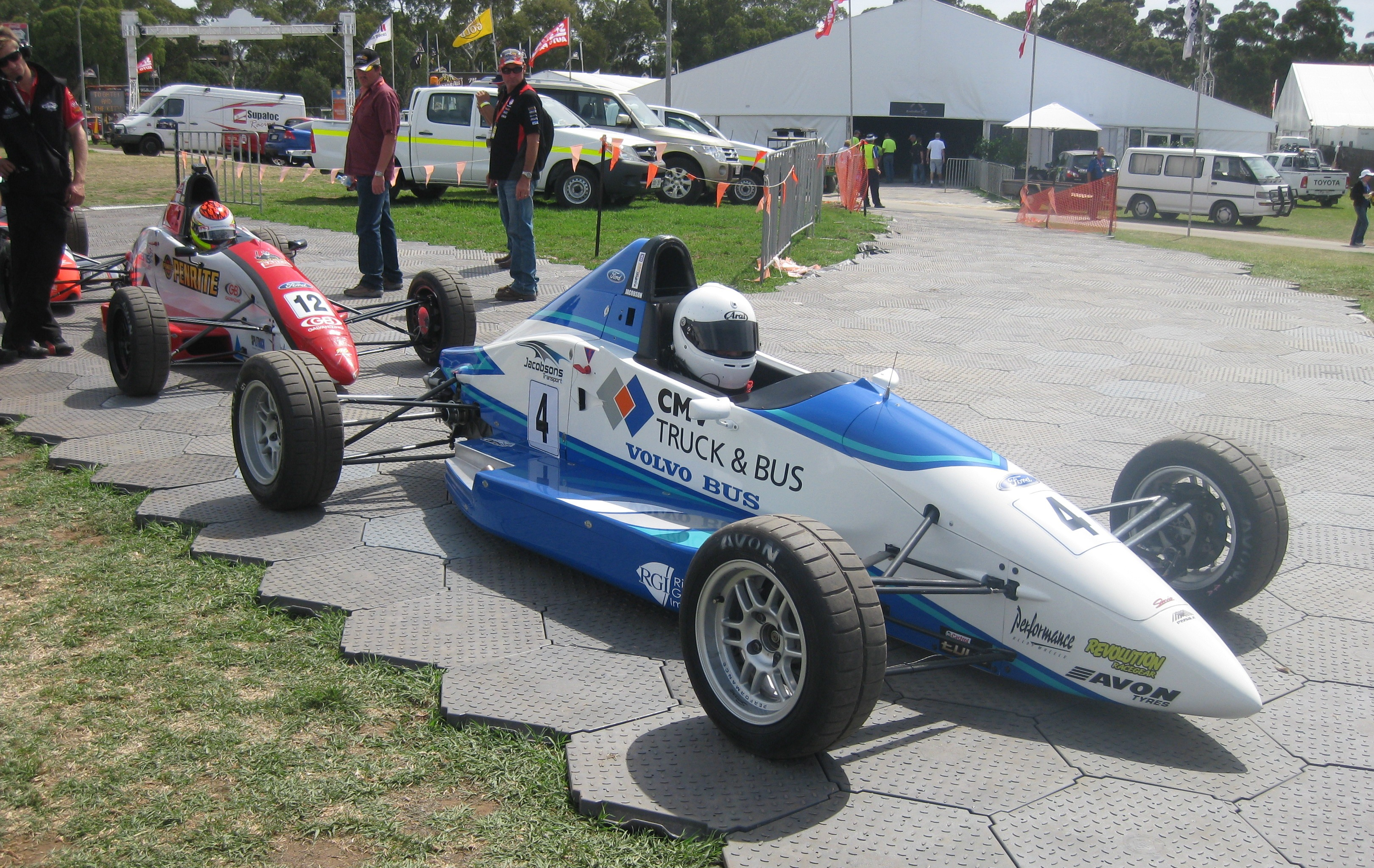
Jacobson placed sixth in the 2011 Australian Formula Ford Championship driving a Mygale SJ08a

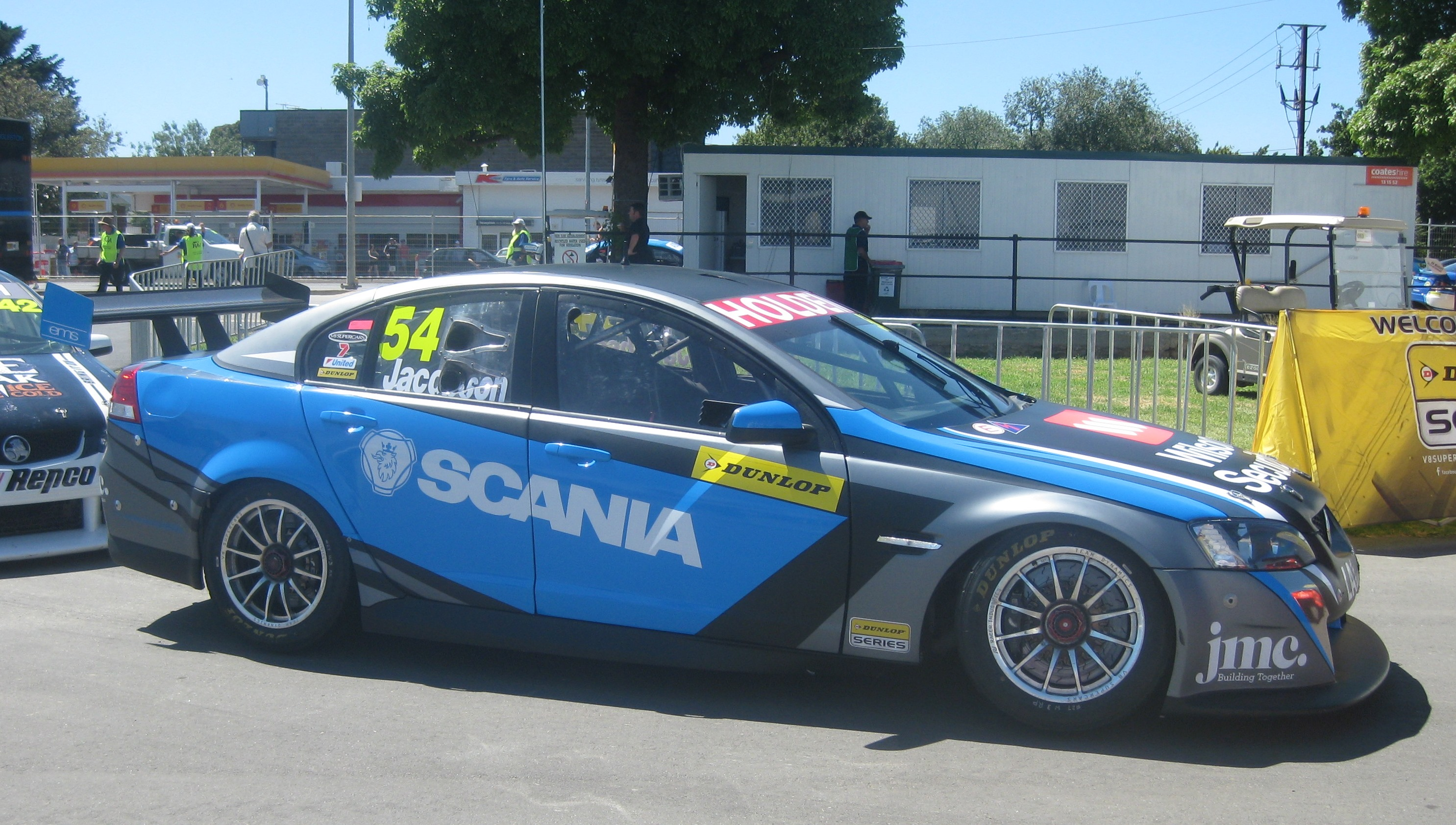
Jacobson placed 11th in the 2014 Development Series.

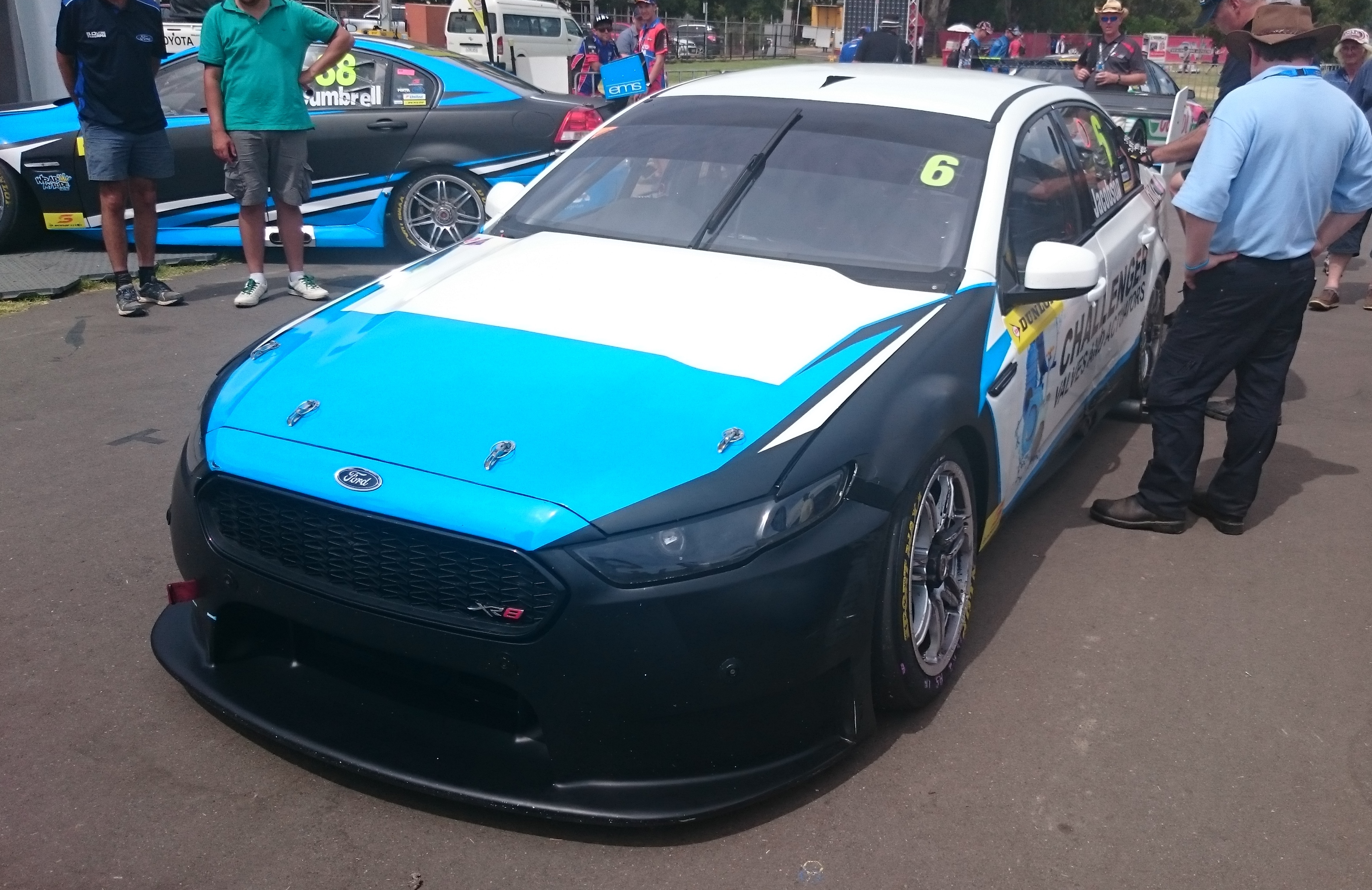
Jacobson won the 2016 Development Series.

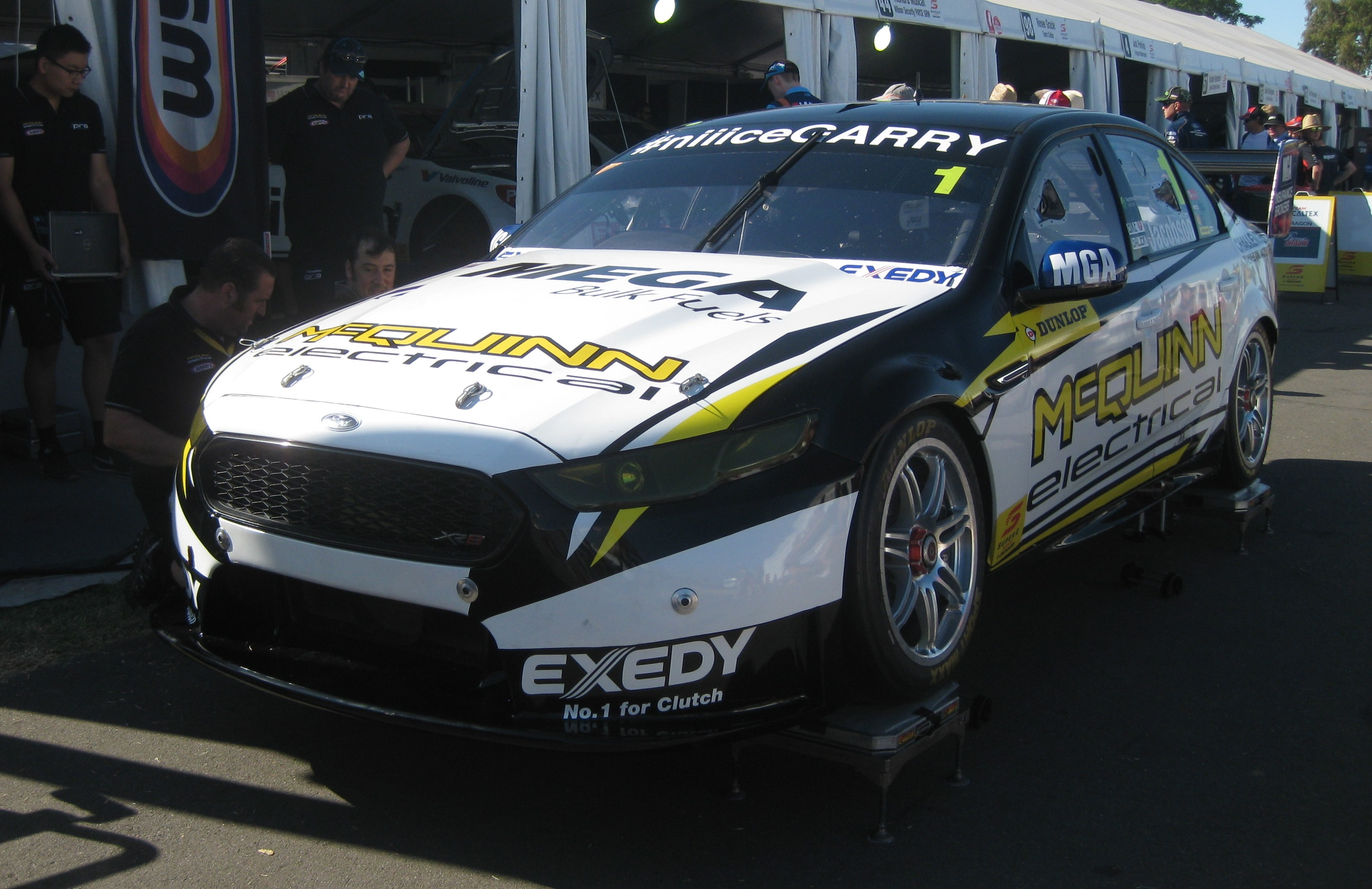
Jacobson placed 6th in the 2017 Super2 Series.

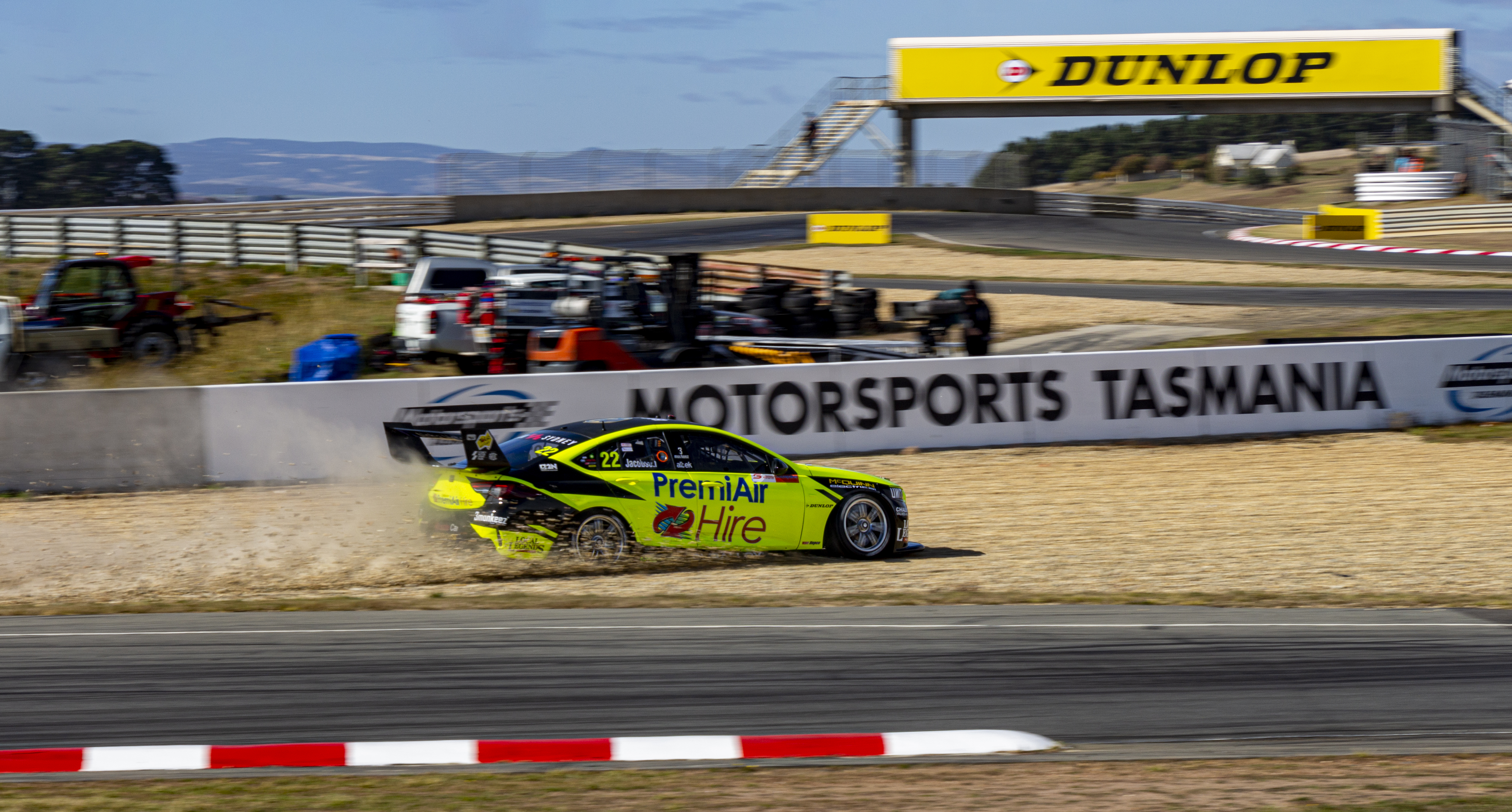
Jacobson competing in the 2021 Tasmania SuperSprint.

Jacobson entered the Supercars Championship full time in 2019 with Kelly Racing, having previously won the Development Series in 2016. He finished 23rd in the standings that season with a best race result of 12th on the Gold Coast. Jacobson switched to Matt Stone Racing for 2020 after Kelly Racing downsized to 2 cars, improving to finish 21st in the points. He moved teams again for 2021, this time to Tekno Autosports and remained there for 2022 as it became PremiAir Racing. Jacobson was sacked after the Darwin round in 2022 and was replaced with James Golding. Jacobson last competed at the 2023 Bathurst 1000 with Thomas Randle, finishing 12th.

== Career results ==
=== Karting career summary ===
Season	Series	Position
2008	Victorian Open Karting Championship - Junior National Heavy	**1st**
2008	Victorian Open Karting Championship - Junior Clubman	**3rd**
2008	Victorian All Stars Series - Junior Clubman	**1st**
2008	Victorian All Stars Series - National Heavy	**1st**
2008	New South Wales Kart Titles - Junior National Heavy	**2nd**
2008	South Australian Kart Titles - Junior Clubman	**2nd**
2008	South Australian Kart Titles - Junior National Heavy	4th
2008	Northern Territory Kart Championship - Junior National Heavy	**1st**
2008	Northern Territory Kart Championship - Junior Clubman	**1st**
2008	Australian Sprint Kart Championship - Junior Clubman	11th
2008	Australian Sprint Kart Championship - Junior National Heavy	**1st**

=== Circuit racing ===
Season	Series	Position	Car	Team
2009	Aussie Racing Cars	7th	Aussie Racing Cars - Yamaha	CAMS "Young Gun" Development
2009	Victorian Formula Ford Championship	21st	Spectrum 011b	CAMS Rising Star
2010	Australian Formula Ford Championship	22nd	Spectrum 011b	CAMS Rising Star
2010	Victorian Formula Ford Championship	**2nd**	Spectrum 011b	Minda Motorsport
2011	Australian Formula Ford Championship	6th	Mygale SJ08a	Sonic Motor Racing Services
2011	Victorian Formula Ford Championship	8th	Mygale SJ08a	Sonic Motor Racing Services
2012	Australian Formula Ford Championship	**3rd**	Mygale SJ12A	Sonic Motor Racing Services
2013	Dunlop V8 Supercar Series	17th	Ford Falcon FG	Sonic Motor Racing Services
2014	Dunlop V8 Supercar Series	11th	Holden Commodore VE	Eggleston Motorsport
2015	V8 Supercars Dunlop Series	6th	Holden Commodore VE	Eggleston Motorsport
2016	Supercars Dunlop Series	**1st**	Ford Falcon FG X	Prodrive Racing Australia
2017	Dunlop Super2 Series	6th	Ford Falcon FG X	Prodrive Racing Australia
2017	Virgin Australia Supercars Championship	40th	Ford Falcon FG X	Britek Motorsport
2018	Dunlop Super2 Series	**3rd**	Nissan Altima L33	MW Motorsport
2018	Virgin Australia Supercars Championship	37th	Nissan Altima L33	Nissan Motorsport
2019	Virgin Australia Supercars Championship	23rd	Nissan Altima L33	Kelly Racing
2020	Virgin Australia Supercars Championship	21st	Holden Commodore ZB	Matt Stone Racing
2021	Repco Supercars Championship	22nd	Holden Commodore ZB	Tekno Autosports
2022	Repco Supercars Championship	26th	Holden Commodore ZB	PremiAir Racing
2023	Repco Supercars Championship	44th	Ford Mustang S560	Tickford Racing

=== Speedway ===
Season	Series	Position	Car	Team
2016	Queensland Sprintcar Series	55th	Maxim	GW Racing
2016	Ultimate Sprintcar Championship - Queensland	18th	Maxim	GW Racing
2017	Queensland Sprintcar Series	57th	Maxim	GW Racing
2017	Ultimate Sprintcar Championship - Queensland	25th	Maxim	GW Racing

=== Super3 Series results ===
(key) (Races in bold indicate pole position) (Races in italics indicate fastest lap)

Year	Team	No.	Car	1	2	3	4	5	6	7	8	9	10	11	12	13	14	15	Position	Points
2016	MW Motorsport	26	Ford FG Falcon	SAN; R1	SAN; R2	SAN; R3	WIN; R4	WIN; R5	WIN; R6	QLD; R7	QLD; R8	QLD; R9	**PHI**; **R10**; 1	PHI; R11; 1	PHI; R12; 1	**SMP**; **R13**; 1	SMP; R14; 2	SMP; R15; 1	6th	281

=== Super2 Series results ===
(key) (Races in bold indicate pole position) (Races in italics indicate fastest lap)

Year	Team	No.	Car	1	2	3	4	5	6	7	8	9	10	11	12	13	14	15	16	17	18	19	20	21	Position	Points
2013	Sonic Motor Racing Services	999	Ford FG Falcon	ADE; R1; 17	ADE; R2; 13	BAR; R3; 11	BAR; R4; 11	BAR; R5; 16	TOW; R6; 27	TOW; R7; 20	TOW; R8; 10	QLD; R9; 19	QLD; R10; 26	QLD; R11; 15	WIN; R12; 18	WIN; R13; 12	WIN; R14; 26	BAT; R15; 15	BAT; R16; 13	HOM; R17; Ret	HOM; R18; 18				17th	717
2014	Eggleston Motorsport	54	Holden VE Commodore	ADE; R1; 10	ADE; R2; 5	WIN; R3; 8	WIN; R4; 3	BAR; R5; 11	BAR; R6; 15	TOW; R7; 15	TOW; R8; 11	QLD; R9; 4	QLD; R10; 6	BAT; R11; Ret	HOM; R12; 21	HOM; R13; Ret									11th	886
2015	Eggleston Motorsport	54	Holden VE Commodore	ADE; R1; 5	ADE; R2; 6	BAR; R3; 9	BAR; R4; 8	BAR; R5; 7	WIN; R6; 15	WIN; R7; 10	WIN; R8; 18	TOW; R9; 2	TOW; R10; 9	QLD; R11; 7	QLD; R12; 6	QLD; R13; 8	BAT; R14; 10	HOM; R15; 2	HOM; R16; 15						6th	1287
2016	Prodrive Racing Australia	6	Ford FG X Falcon	ADE; R1; 3	**ADE**; **R2**; **1**	PHI; R3; 1	**PHI**; **R4**; **2**	PHI; R5; 1	BAR; R6; 3	BAR; R7; 24	BAR; R8; 12	TOW; R9; 2	TOW; R10; 5	**SAN**; **R11**; **1**	**SAN**; **R12**; **2**	SAN; R13; 5	**BAT**; **R14**; **2**	HOM; R15; 5	**HOM**; **R16**; **5**						**1st**	**1738**
2017	Prodrive Racing Australia	1	Ford FG X Falcon	ADE; R1; 11	ADE; R2; 7	ADE; R3; 7	SYM; R4; 10	SYM; R5; 17	SYM; R6; 7	SYM; R7; 5	PHI; R8; 1	**PHI**; **R9**; **Ret**	PHI; R10; 8	PHI; R11; 5	TOW; R12; 4	TOW; R13; Ret	SMP; R14; 5	SMP; R15; 3	SMP; R16; 5	SMP; R17; 3	SAN; R18; 18	SAN; R19; 20	NEW; R20; 2	NEW; R21; 17	6th	1166
2018	MW Motorsport	26	Nissan Altima L33	**ADE**; **R1**; **2**	ADE; R2; 1	**ADE**; **R3**; **2**	SYM; R4; 21	SYM; R5; 3	SYM; R6; Ret	BAR; R7; 12	BAR; R8; 3	BAR; R9; 4	TOW; R10; 1	TOW; R11; 5	SAN; R12; 18	SAN; R13; 5	BAT; R14; 4	NEW; R15; 4	NEW; R16; C						**3rd**	**1393**

=== Supercars Championship results ===
Supercars results
Year	Team	No.	Car	1	2	3	4	5	6	7	8	9	10	11	12	13	14	15	16	17	18	19	20	21	22	23	24	25	26	27	28	29	30	31	32	33	34	Position	Points
2017	Britek Motorsport	56	Ford FG X Falcon	ADE; R1	ADE; R2	SYM; R3	SYM; R4	PHI; R5	PHI; R6	BAR; R7	BAR; R8	WIN; R9; PO	WIN; R10; PO	HID; R11	HID; R12	TOW; R13	TOW; R14	QLD; R15; PO	QLD; R16; PO	SMP; R17	SMP; R18	SAN; QR; 18	SAN; R19; 19	BAT; R20; 8	SUR; R21; 9	SUR; R22; 16	PUK; R23	PUK; R24	NEW; R25	NEW; R26								40th	417
2018	Nissan Motorsport	15	Nissan Altima L33	ADE; R1	ADE; R2	MEL; R3	MEL; R4	MEL; R5	MEL; R6	SYM; R7	SYM; R8	PHI; R9	PHI; R10	BAR; R11	BAR; R12	WIN; R13; PO	WIN; R14; PO	HID; R15	HID; R16	TOW; R17	TOW; R18	QLD; R19; PO	QLD; R20; PO	SMP; R21	BEN; R22	BEN; R23	SAN; QR; 20	SAN; R24; 8	BAT; R25; 11	SUR; R26; 22	SUR; R27; C	PUK; R28	PUK; R29	NEW; R30	NEW; R31			37th	363
2019	Nissan Motorsport	3	Nissan Altima L33	ADE; R1; 19	ADE; R2; 22	MEL; R3; 21	MEL; R4; 24	MEL; R5; 19	MEL; R6; 17	SYM; R7; 24	SYM; R8; Ret	PHI; R9; 19	PHI; R10; 19	BAR; R11; 19	BAR; R12; 19	WIN; R13; 21	WIN; R14; 18	HID; R15; 14	HID; R16; 24	TOW; R17; 24	TOW; R18; Ret	QLD; R19; 20	QLD; R20; Ret	BEN; R21; 20	BEN; R22; 19	PUK; R23; 18	PUK; R24; 21	BAT; R25; 19	SUR; R26; 15	SUR; R27; 12	SAN; QR; 22	SAN; R28; Ret	NEW; R29; 20	NEW; R30; 22				23rd	1176
2020	Matt Stone Racing	35	Holden ZB Commodore	ADE; R1; Ret	ADE; R2; 20	MEL; R3; C	MEL; R4; C	MEL; R5; C	MEL; R6; C	SMP1; R7; 16	SMP1; R8; 21	SMP1; R9; 19	SMP2; R10; 22	SMP2; R11; 7	SMP2; R12; 24	HID1; R13; 19	HID1; R14; 19	HID1; R15; 13	HID2; R16; 22	HID2; R17; 24	HID2; R18; 16	TOW1; R19; 14	TOW1; R20; 16	TOW1; R21; 18	TOW2; R22; 15	TOW2; R23; 17	TOW2; R24; 20	BEN1; R25; 19	BEN1; R26; 22	BEN1; R27; 13	BEN2; R28; 18	BEN2; R29; Ret	BEN2; R30; 21	BAT; R31; Ret				21st	833
2021	Team Sydney	22	Holden ZB Commodore	BAT1; R1; Ret	BAT1; R2; 20	SAN; R3; 20	SAN; R4; 20	SAN; R5; 19	SYM; R6; 20	SYM; R7; 19	SYM; R8; 24	BEN; R9; 24	BEN; R10; 14	BEN; R11; Ret	HID; R12; 18	HID; R13; Ret	HID; R14; 18	TOW1; R15; 20	TOW1; R16; 19	TOW2; R17; 18	TOW2; R18; 17	TOW2; R19; 17	SMP1; R20; 17	SMP1; R21; 22	SMP1; R22; 21	SMP2; R23; 20	SMP2; R24; 23	SMP2; R25; 12	SMP3; R26; 15	SMP3; R27; 24	SMP3; R28; 18	SMP4; R29; 22	SMP4; R30; NC	BAT2; R31; 14				22nd	1003
2022	PremiAir Racing	76	Holden ZB Commodore	SMP; R1; 18	SMP; R2; Ret	SYM; R3; 16	SYM; R4; Ret	SYM; R5; 20	MEL; R6; 9	MEL; R7; 6	MEL; R8; 10	MEL; R9; 15	BAR; R10; 18	BAR; R11; 14	BAR; R12; 24	WIN; R13; 19	WIN; R14; 26	WIN; R15; 16	HID; R16; 22	HID; R17; 18	HID; R18; 22	TOW; R19	TOW; R20	BEN; R21	BEN; R22	BEN; R23	SAN; R24	SAN; R25	SAN; R26	PUK; R27	PUK; R28	PUK; R29	BAT; R30	SUR; R31	SUR; R32	ADE; R33	ADE; R34	26th	513
2023	Tickford Racing	55	Ford Mustang S650	NEW; R1	NEW; R2	MEL; R3	MEL; R4	MEL; R5	MEL; R6	BAR; R7	BAR; R8	BAR; R9	SYM; R10	SYM; R11	SYM; R12	HID; R13	HID; R14	HID; R15	TOW; R16	TOW; R17	SMP; R18	SMP; R19	BEN; R20	BEN; R21	BEN; R22	SAN; R23; 25	BAT; R24; 12	SUR; R25	SUR; R26	ADE; R27	ADE; R28							44th	198

=== Bathurst 1000 results ===
Year	Team	Car	Co-driver	Position	Laps
2017	Britek Motorsport	Ford Falcon FG X	(Australia) Jason Bright	8th	161
2018	Nissan Motorsport	Nissan Altima L33	(Australia) Rick Kelly	11th	161
2019	Kelly Racing	Nissan Altima L33	(Australia) Dean Fiore	19th	159
2020	Matt Stone Racing	Holden Commodore ZB	(Australia) David Russell	DNF	62
2021	Tekno Autosports	Holden Commodore ZB	(Australia) Dylan O'Keeffe	14th	161
2023	Tickford Racing	Ford Mustang S650	(Australia) Thomas Randle	12th	161

=== Complete Bathurst 12 Hour results ===
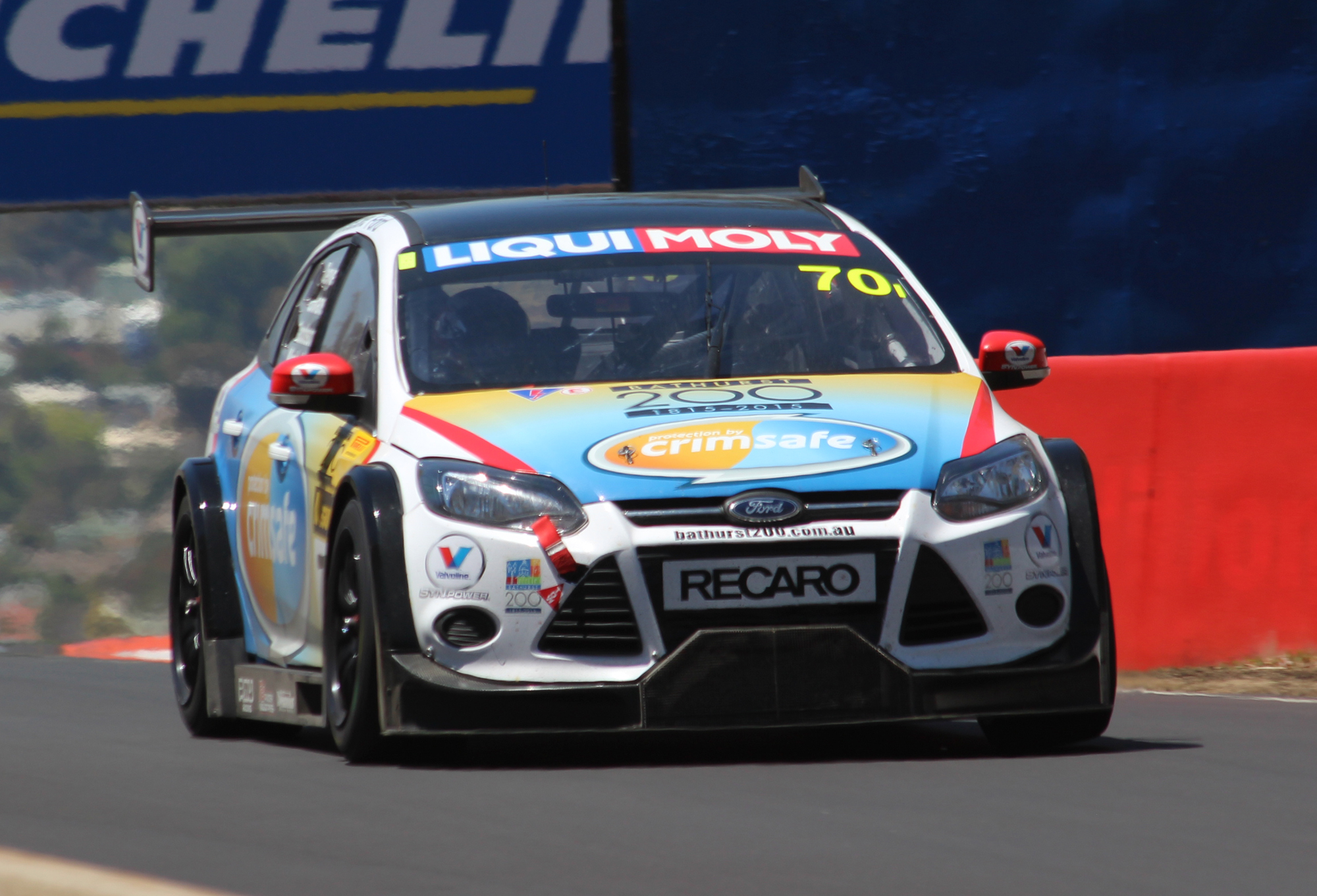
The Class I-winning MARC Focus GTC of Grant Denyer, Adam Gowans, Garry Jacobson and Andrew Miedecke at the 2014 Liqui Moly Bathurst 12 Hour

Year	Team	Co-drivers	Car	Class	Laps	Overall position	Class position
2014	MARC Cars Australia Pty Ltd	(Australia) Adam Gowans (Australia) Grant Denyer (Australia) Andrew Miedecke	MARC Focus GTC	I	268	15th	**1st**
2015	MARC Cars Australia Pty Ltd	(Australia) Adam Gowans (Australia) Ben Gersekowski	MARC Focus GTC	I	261	15th	**1st**
2018	MARC Cars Australia	(Australia) Grant Denyer (Australia) Tyler Everingham	MARC Mazda 3 V8	I	244	25th	**2nd**

=== Complete Silverstone 24 Hour results ===
Year	Team	Co-drivers	Car	Class	Laps	Overall position	Class position
2015	MARC Cars Australia Pty Ltd	(United Kingdom) Paul White (United Kingdom) Tom Onslow-Cole (Australia) Ben Gersekowski	MARC Focus GTC	Class 2	487	9th	**1st**

Sporting positions
Preceded by Cam Waters	Supercars Dunlop Series; Champion; 2016	Succeeded by Todd Hazelwood
