= 2011 Australian Formula Ford Championship =

Motor racing competition

Seasons
- ← 2010 2012 →

The 2011 Australian Formula Ford Championship was a CAMS sanctioned national motor racing title for drivers of Formula Ford racing cars. It was the 42nd national series for Formula Fords to be held in Australia and the 19th to carry the Australian Formula Ford Championship name. The championship was contested over an eight-round series which began on 17 March 2011 at the Adelaide Parklands Circuit and ended on 13 November at Symmons Plains Raceway. Australian Formula Ford Management Pty. Ltd. was appointed by CAMS as the Category Manager for the series, which was officially known as the "2011 Australian Formula Ford Championship for the Ford Fiesta Cup".

Sonic Motor Racing Services driver Cam Waters dominated the championship with a winning margin of 74 points over second placed Jack Le Brocq. Waters recorded seven race wins to Le Brocq's four, whilst third placed Nick Foster won six races. Other race winners were Matthew Brabham, who only contested a partial season in 2011, Daniel Erickson, Tom Williamson in the factory-supported Spectrum, Trent Harrison and Liam Sager.

== Teams and drivers ==
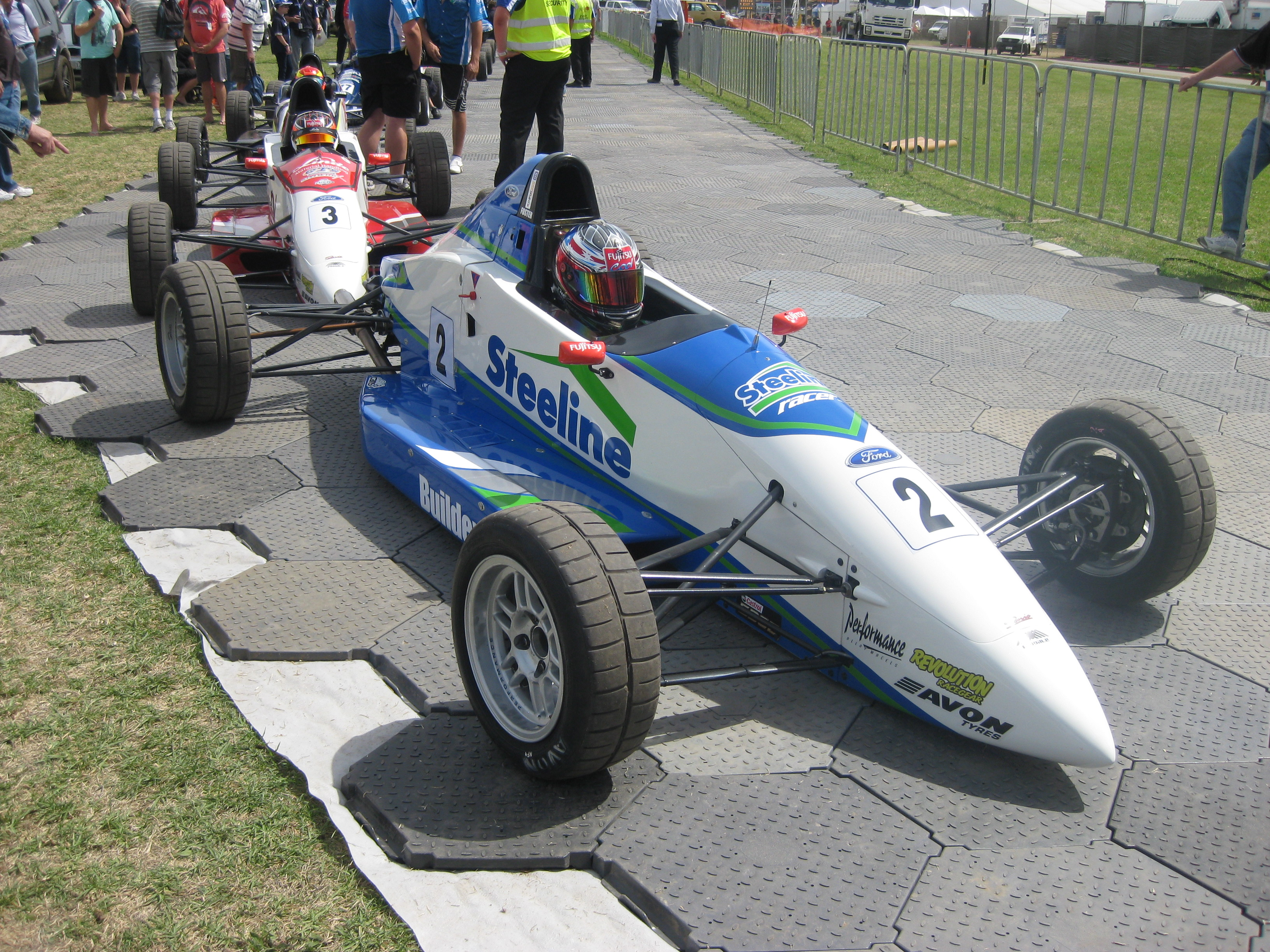
Nick Foster (Mygale SJ011a) placed 3rd in the championship

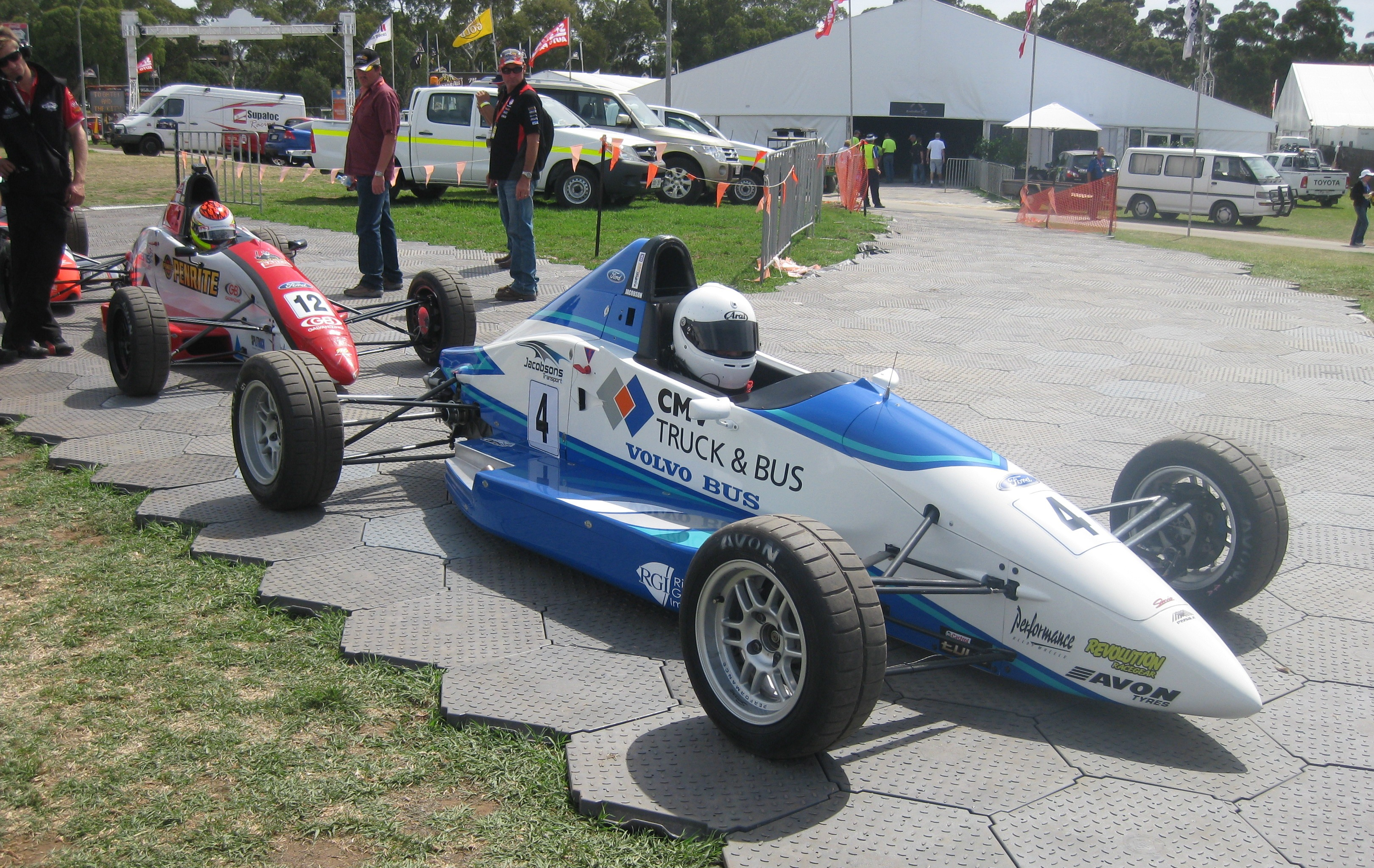
Garry Jacobson (Mygale SJ08a) placed 6th in the championship

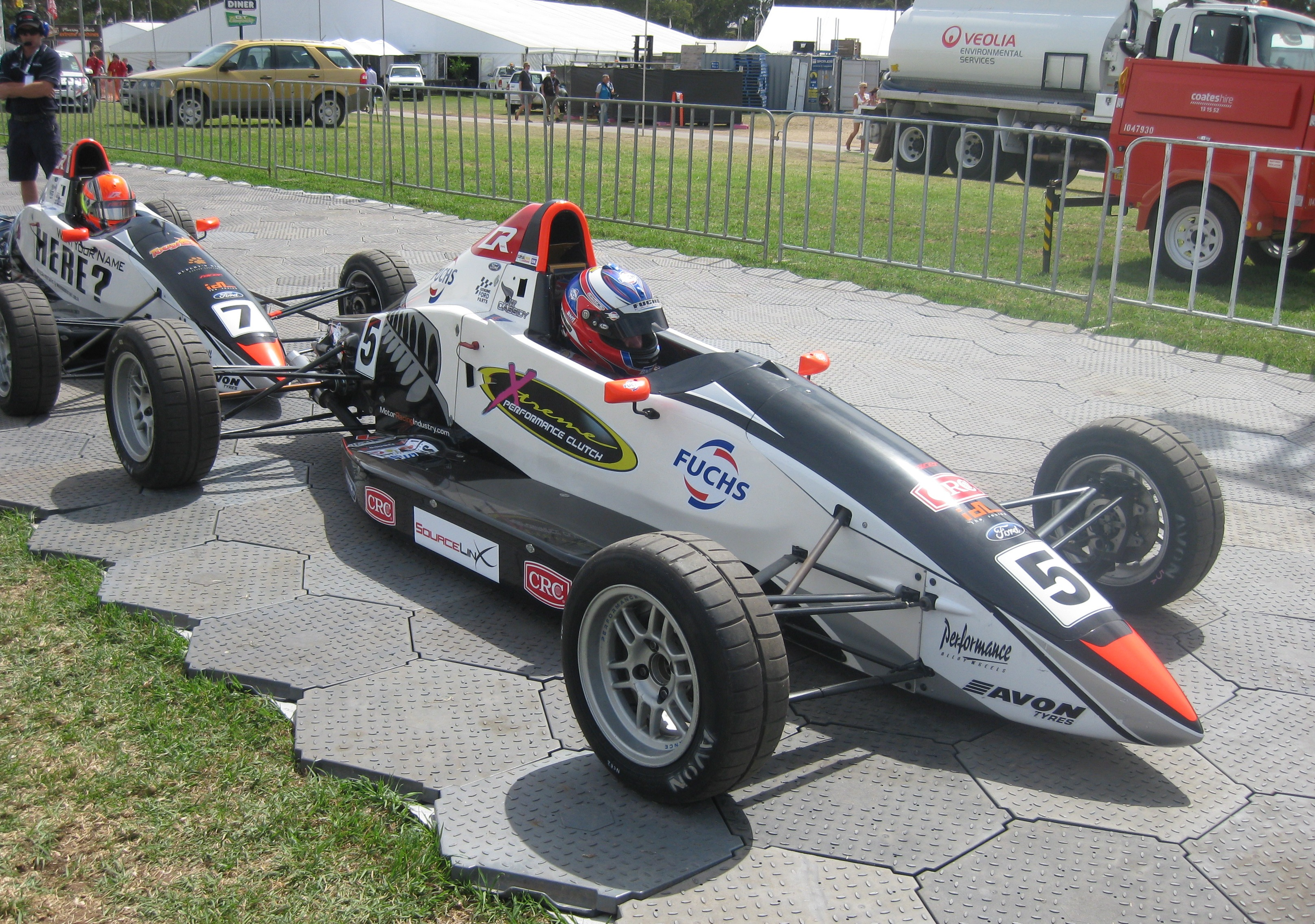
Nick Cassidy (Mygale SJ11a) placed 14th in the championship

The following teams and drivers contested the 2011 Australian Formula Ford Championship. All teams and drivers were Australian-registered, excepting Nick Cassidy and Andre Heimgartner, who were New Zealander-registered.

Team	Chassis	No	Driver	Rounds
Sonic Motor Racing Services	Mygale SJ11a	2	(Australia) Nick Foster	
Sonic Motor Racing Services	Mygale SJ10a	3	(Australia) Cam Waters	
Sonic Motor Racing Services	Mygale SJ08a	4	(Australia) Garry Jacobson	
Sonic Motor Racing Services	Mygale SJ10a	83	(Australia) Matthew Brabham	
Evans Motorsport Group	Mygale SJ11A	5	(New Zealand) Nick Cassidy	
Evans Motorsport Group	Mygale SJ11A	5	(Australia) Jordan Lloyd	
Evans Motorsport Group	Mygale SJ11A	5	(Australia) Andre Borell	
Evans Motorsport Group	Mygale SJ10A	6	(Australia) Adam Graham	
Evans Motorsport Group	Mygale SJ10A	6	(Australia) Andre Borell	
Evans Motorsport Group	Mygale SJ11A	7	(Australia) Elliot Barbour	
Evans Motorsport Group	Mygale SJ10A	66	(Australia) Jesse Fenech	
Evans Motorsport Group	Mygale SJ11A	94	(Australia) Jordan Lloyd	
Minda Motorsport (CAMS Rising Stars)	Mygale SJ10a	7	(Australia) Elliott Barbour	
Minda Motorsport (CAMS Rising Stars)	Mygale SJ11a	8	(Australia) Tom Williamson	
Minda Motorsport (CAMS Rising Stars)	Mygale SJ10a	11	(Australia) Callum Mitchell	
Minda Motorsport (CAMS Rising Stars)	Mygale SJ11a	12	(Australia) Trent Harrison	
Minda Motorsport (CAMS Rising Stars)	Mygale SJ11a	49	(Australia) Jack Le Brocq	
Minda Motorsport (CAMS Rising Stars)	Mygale SJ11a	54	(Australia) Jon Collins	
Borland Racing Developments	Spectrum 012	8	(Australia) Tom Williamson	
Borland Racing Developments	Spectrum 012	23	(Australia) Daniel Erickson	
Borland Racing Developments	Spectrum 012	27	(Australia) Shae Davies	
Borland Racing Developments	Spectrum 012	66	(Australia) Jesse Fenech	
Borland Racing Developments	Spectrum 012	66	(Australia) Daniel Erickson	
Borland Racing Developments	Spectrum 012b	77	(Australia) Caleb Rayner	
Borland Racing Developments	Spectrum 011d	99	(Australia) Daniel Ramerman	
Synergy Motorsport	Spectrum 012	10	(Australia) Liam Sager	
Synergy Motorsport	Spectrum 011c	17	(Australia) Sam Power	
Synergy Motorsport	Spectrum 011c	27	(Australia) Shae Davies	
Synergy Motorsport	Spectrum 012	62	(Australia) Mathew Hart	
TanderSport	Stealth S311D	15	(Australia) Rhett Noonan	
TanderSport	Stealth S311D	16	(Australia) Peter Major	
Anglo Motorsport	Mygale SJ10a	18	(Australia) Jonathan Venter	
Richter Racing	Spectrum 011b	21	(Australia) Dylan Richter	
Team BRM	Mygale SJ09a	30	(Australia) Tom Goess	
Team BRM	Mygale SJ09a	31	(New Zealand) Andre Heimgartner	
Team BRM	Mygale SJ11a	41	(Australia) Simon Hodge	
National Surgical	Mygale SJ09a	32	(Australia) Jon Mills	
M. Roesler Services	Spectrum 011c	36	(Australia) Matthew Roesler	
Pick and Payless	Mygale SJ07	37	(Australia) Josh Hunter	
Mike O’Donnell Racing	Spectrum 011b	39	(Australia) Mike O’Donnell	
Race Solutions	Mygale SJ11a	42	(Australia) Samantha Reid	
Brad Jones Racing	Mygale SJ09a	69	(Australia) Zac Schonberger	
Listec Race Cars	Listec WiL 013	95	(Australia) Glenn Welch	

Note: All cars were powered by 1600cc Ford Duratec engines, as mandated by the 2011 Australian Formula Ford Technical Regulations.

== Calendar ==
All races were held in Australia.

Round	Circuit	Date	Round winner	Car
1	Adelaide Parklands Circuit	18–20 March	Tom Williamson	Spectrum 012
2	Winton Motor Raceway	20–22 May	Matthew Brabham	Mygale SJ10a
3	Eastern Creek Raceway	15–17 July	Cam Waters	Mygale SJ10a
4	Queensland Raceway	19–21 August	Cam Waters	Mygale SJ10a
5	Sandown Raceway	9–11 September	Jack Le Brocq	Mygale SJ11a
6	Phillip Island Grand Prix Circuit	16–18 September	Cam Waters	Mygale SJ10a
7	Surfers Paradise Street Circuit	21–23 October	Jack Le Brocq	Mygale SJ11a
8	Symmons Plains Raceway	11–13 November	Nick Foster	Mygale SJ11a

Note: Round 1 was contested over two races and all other rounds were contested over three races.

== Season summary ==
Rd	Race	Circuit	Pole position	Fastest lap	Winning driver	Winning team
1	1	(South Australia) Adelaide Street Circuit	(Australia) Cam Waters	(Australia) Cam Waters	(Australia) Cam Waters	Sonic Motor Racing Services
1	2	(South Australia) Adelaide Street Circuit		(Australia) Tom Williamson	(Australia) Tom Williamson	Borland Racing Developments
2	1	(New South Wales) Winton Motor Raceway	(Australia) Matthew Brabham	(Australia) Matthew Brabham	(Australia) Matthew Brabham	Sonic Motor Racing Services
2	2	(New South Wales) Winton Motor Raceway		(Australia) Cam Waters	(Australia) Cam Waters	Sonic Motor Racing Services
2	3	(New South Wales) Winton Motor Raceway		(Australia) Adam Graham	(Australia) Matthew Brabham	Sonic Motor Racing Services
3	1	(New South Wales) Eastern Creek Raceway	(Australia) Cam Waters	(Australia) Jack Le Brocq	(Australia) Cam Waters	Sonic Motor Racing Services
3	2	(New South Wales) Eastern Creek Raceway		(Australia) Tom Williamson	(Australia) Cam Waters	Sonic Motor Racing Services
3	3	(New South Wales) Eastern Creek Raceway		(Australia) Nick Foster	(Australia) Nick Foster	Sonic Motor Racing Services
4	1	Queensland Raceway	(Australia) Nick Foster	(Australia) Matthew Brabham	(Australia) Nick Foster	Sonic Motor Racing Services
4	2	Queensland Raceway		(Australia) Matthew Brabham	(Australia) Jack Le Brocq	Minda Motorsport
4	3	Queensland Raceway		(Australia) Cam Waters	(Australia) Cam Waters	Sonic Motor Racing Services
5	1	(Victoria (state)) Sandown Raceway	(Australia) Cam Waters	(Australia) Cam Waters	(Australia) Nick Foster	Sonic Motor Racing Services
5	2	(Victoria (state)) Sandown Raceway		(Australia) Cam Waters	(Australia) Cam Waters	Sonic Motor Racing Services
5	3	(Victoria (state)) Sandown Raceway		(Australia) Jack Le Brocq	(Australia) Cam Waters	Sonic Motor Racing Services
6	1	(Victoria (state)) Phillip Island Grand Prix Circuit	(Australia) Cam Waters	(Australia) Nick Foster	(Australia) Daniel Erickson	Borland Racing Developments
6	2	(Victoria (state)) Phillip Island Grand Prix Circuit		(Australia) Cam Waters	(Australia) Trent Harrison	Minda Motorsport
6	3	(Victoria (state)) Phillip Island Grand Prix Circuit		(Australia) Trent Harrison	(Australia) Jack Le Brocq	Minda Motorsport
7	1	(Queensland) Surfers Paradise Street Circuit	(Australia) Cam Waters	(Australia) Cam Waters	(Australia) Liam Sager	Synergy Motorsport
7	2	(Queensland) Surfers Paradise Street Circuit		(Australia) Tom Goess	(Australia) Jack Le Brocq	Minda Motorsport
7	3	(Queensland) Surfers Paradise Street Circuit		(Australia) Nick Foster	(Australia) Jack Le Brocq	Minda Motorsport
8	1	(Tasmania) Symmons Plains Raceway	(Australia) Nick Foster	(Australia) Daniel Erickson	(Australia) Nick Foster	Sonic Motor Racing Services
8	2	(Tasmania) Symmons Plains Raceway		(Australia) Cam Waters	(Australia) Cam Waters	Sonic Motor Racing Services
8	3	(Tasmania) Symmons Plains Raceway		(Australia) Shae Davies	(Australia) Nick Foster	Sonic Motor Racing Services

== Points ==
Championship points were awarded on a 20–16–14–12–10–8–6–4–2–1 basis to the top ten classified finishers in each race. An additional point was awarded to the driver gaining pole position for the first race at each round.

== Results ==
Pos.	Driver	(South Australia) ADE		(New South Wales) WIN			(New South Wales) EAS			(Queensland) QUE			(Victoria (state)) SAN			(Victoria (state)) PHI			(Queensland) SUR			(Tasmania) SYM			Pen	Pts
Pos.	Driver	R1	R2	R1	R2	R3	R1	R2	R3	R1	R2	R3	R1	R2	R3	R1	R2	R3	R1	R2	R3	R1	R2	R3	Pen	Pts
1	(Australia) Cam Waters	1	Ret	3	1	2	1	1	2	3	3	1	4	4	1	3	2	2	2	Ret	5	2	1	Ret		331
2	(Australia) Jack Le Brocq	14	8	7	3	4	2	2	Ret	4	1	8	3	2	2	13	4	1	3	1	1	3	4	Ret	-5	257
3	(Australia) Nick Foster	2	Ret	4	2	15	4	5	1	1	Ret	2	1	1	14	6	5	3	Ret	Ret	3	1	2	1	-15	251
4	(Australia) Tom Williamson	3	1	17	13	6	5	3	4	15	10	5	8	5	4	2	3	6	4	3	2	8	9	5	-10	201
5	(Australia) Trent Harrison	7	4	Ret	10	3	3	4	3	11	Ret	Ret	Ret	7	3	4	1	4	Ret	Ret	Ret	5	10	6		156
6	(Australia) Garry Jacobson	4	6	2	4	9	6	6	5	8	5	6	2	3	8	Ret	11	5	Ret	DNS	DNS				-5	137
7	(Australia) Liam Sager	DSQ	7	5	6	5	8	Ret	DNS	5	8	3	Ret	9	7	7	7	11	1	2	12	7	7	7	-10	130
8	(Australia) Daniel Erickson									7	Ret	9	6	8	11	1	6	7	9	8	8	4	3	3		104
9	(Australia) Matthew Brabham			1	5	1				2	2	7				5	10	12							-5	95
10	(Australia) Shae Davies	Ret	Ret	8	7	14	12	10	9	6	6	Ret	DNS	12	13	9	8	9	5	4	6	Ret	5	2		93
11	(Australia) Mathew Hart	DSQ	9	6	14	Ret	Ret	14	12	10	7	4	Ret	Ret	9	10	9	8	7	6	Ret	6	6	4	-10	70
12	(Australia) Jesse Fenech	5	2	10	9	Ret	10	9	6				5	6	5	11	Ret	10							-5	64
13	(Australia) Tom Goess	8	Ret	16	19	8	16	12	13										6	5	4				-15	23
14	(New Zealand) Nick Cassidy	6	3																							22
15	(Australia) Andre Borell									12	4	Ret							10	9	9					17
16	(Australia) Adam Graham	12	11	9	15	12	7	7	8																-5	13
17	(Australia) John Hunter						9	8	7																	12
18	(Australia) Sam Power	16	12																8	7	7				-5	11
19	(Australia) Peter Major	11	5																DNS	DNS	DNS					10
20	(Australia) Simon Hodge												10	14	6											9
20	(Australia) Jonathan Venter																					10	8	8		9
20	(Australia) Elliot Barbour	22	Ret	12	12	16	15	13	17	16	Ret	12	7	Ret	10	8	Ret	Ret	11	10	10	Ret	11	10	-5	9
23	(Australia) Jordan Lloyd			13	Ret	7							9	13	11	17	Ret	17								8
24	(New Zealand) Andre Heimgartner	10	Ret	11	8	10	13	11	11																	6
24	(Australia) Caleb Rayner	9	13	15	11	17	11	Ret	14	13	9	10	Ret	10	Ret											6
26	(Australia) Daniel Ramerman	11	Ret	14	16	Ret	19	16	16	14	12	Ret	9	11	12	12	DNS	Ret								2
26	(Australia) Callum Mitchell																					9	12	Ret		2
28	(Australia) Samantha Reid	13	10																							1
28	(Australia) Jon Collins						17	15	10							18	13	14								1
	(Australia) Zac Schonberger	19	15	18	17	13				17	11	13														0
	(Australia) Jon Mills									18	14	14							Ret	12	14					0
	(Australia) Greg Holloway																		13	13	13					0
	(Australia) Glenn Welch						14	Ret	15																	0
	(Australia) Dylan Richter	21	16																							0
	(Australia) Michael O'Donnell	17	Ret																							0
	(Australia) Matthew Roesler	20	Ret																							0
	(Australia) Rhett Noonan	18	14	19	18	11	18	Ret	18				Ret	13	Ret				12	11	11	11	13	9	-20	-18
Pos.	Driver	(South Australia) ADE		(New South Wales) WIN			(New South Wales) EAS			(Queensland) QUE			(Victoria (state)) SAN			(Victoria (state)) PHI			(Queensland) SUR			(Tasmania) SYM			Pen	Pts
Pos.	Driver	R1	R2	R1	R2	R3	R1	R2	R3	R1	R2	R3	R1	R2	R3	R1	R2	R3	R1	R2	R3	R1	R2	R3	Pen	Pts

Colour	Result
Gold	Winner
Silver	Second place
Bronze	Third place
Green	Points classification
Blue	Non-points classification
Blue	Non-classified finish (NC)
Purple	Retired, not classified (Ret)
Red	Did not qualify (DNQ)
Red	Did not pre-qualify (DNPQ)
Black	Disqualified (DSQ)
White	Did not start (DNS)
White	Withdrew (WD)
White	Race cancelled (C)
Blank	Did not practice (DNP)
Blank	Did not arrive (DNA)
Blank	Excluded (EX)

- # Note: Rhett Noonan was officially classified in the championship results, whereas drivers who did not score any championship points were not classified.
