= Sonic Motor Racing Services =

Team Sonic
- Manufacturer: Porsche (Porsche Carrera Cup & Porsche Sprint Challenge); Mygale (Formula Ford)
- Team Principal: Michael Ritter
- Race Drivers: Carrera Cup Australia; 77: Rodney Jane; 777: Marcos Flack; 999: Angelo Mouzouris; Australian Formula Ford; 2: Valentino Astuti; 88: Harrison Goodman
- Chassis: Mygale SJ18a (Formula Ford); Porsche 911 GT3 Cup (Carrera Cup Australia & Porsche Sprint Challenge)
- Debut: Porsche Carrera Cup Australia: 2003; Australian Formula Ford: 1998; Porsche Sprint Challenge Australia: 2015; Fujitsu Series: 2009
- Drivers' Championships: Carrera Cup: 2 Australian Formula Ford: 11; Porsche Sprint Challenge: 4
- Round wins: 0
- position: 0

Sonic Motor Racing Services is an Australian racing team that is competes in the Porsche Carrera Cup Australia Championship, Porsche Sprint Challenge, the Australian Formula Ford Championship, and the Victorian Formula Ford Championship. The team was formed by Michael Ritter, son of long time touring car racer Graham Ritter and brother of V8 Supercar racer Greg Ritter. Ritter formed the team in 1998 to compete in the Australian Formula Ford Championship. The team used Van Diemen chassis' for the first decade of their existence, which brought them championship victories in the Australian Formula Ford Championship in 2001, 2002, and 2004.

== Formula Ford ==
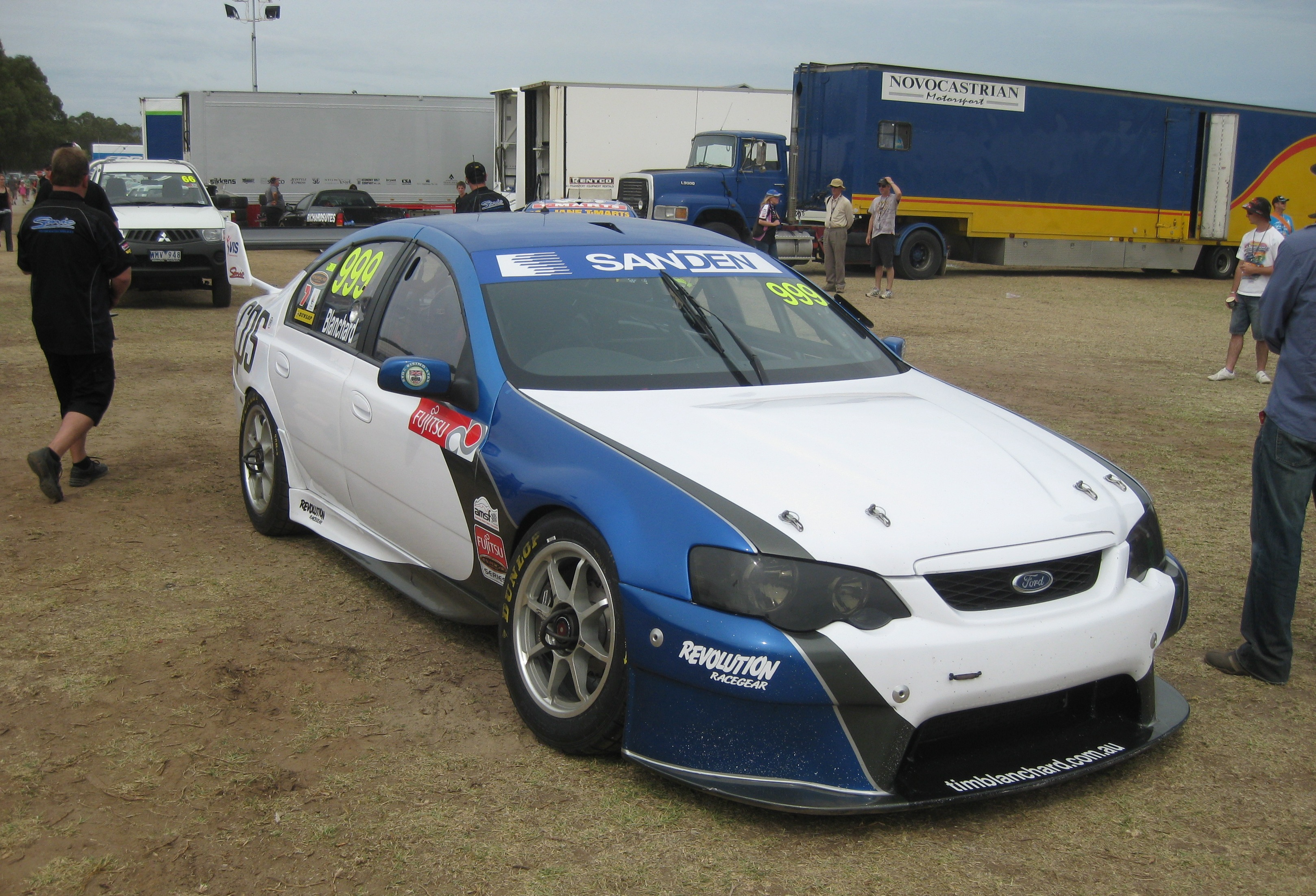
The Sonic Motor Racing Services Ford BF Falcon, as driven by Tim Blanchard at the opening round of the 2010 Fujitsu V8 Supercar Series at the Adelaide Parklands Circuit

The team was formed to run the Davison family, beginning in the 1998 Australian Formula Ford Championship with Alex Davison. Alex would run with the team for the 1998 & 1999 seasons before going overseas and handing the ride to younger brother Will Davison. Will would win the title in 2001 for the team, now entered under the Garry Rogers Motorsport banner. Sonic would go back to back winning the 2002 championship with GRM protégé Jamie Whincup. The team would win their first championship under their own name in 2004 with David Reynolds. Sonic would expand to 3 cars in 2006, running future supercars drivers Tim Blanchard and Tim Slade, who would finish second in the championship as well as Todd Fiore. For 2007 the team would switch to Mygale Chassis' and Blanchard would win the championship, James Moffat would finish third for the team. Sonic would run Nick Percat under the Walkinshaw racing name in the 2007, 2008, & 2009 series. He would win the series in 2009, this being the most dominant season in the history of the series. Percat would win a record 12 races in a season, as well as a record 9 races in a row.

In 2010 the team expanded to 4 cars, including one for future supercars driver Cam Waters. Waters would win the series in 2011. Garry Jacobson would also drive for the team in 2011 and 2012. Anton DePasquale would debut with the team in 2012 and sweep the final round of the series at Winton. He would go full time with the team in 2013 alongside Simon Hodge. in 2016 Leanne Tander would win the series for Sonic, with Max Vidau 8th. Sonic would again become back to back champions in 2017, with Max Vidau winning the series. Future Super 2 driver Angelo Mouzouris would make his debut with the team, Hamish Ribarits would also make his first start in 2017. In 2018 Sonic Motor Racing Services would win their third championship in a row, with Hunter McElrea winning the series from Ribarits who had remained with the team. Mouzouris would finish 6th. Sonic would become the first team to win 4 back to back championships, Angelo Mouzouris would win the series in 2019. Jay Hanson would also make his full time debut with the team in 2019. With the return of a national championship in 2021, Sonic would field entries for 3rd year driver Harrison Goodman and debutant Valentino Astuti.

== Carrera Cup Australia ==
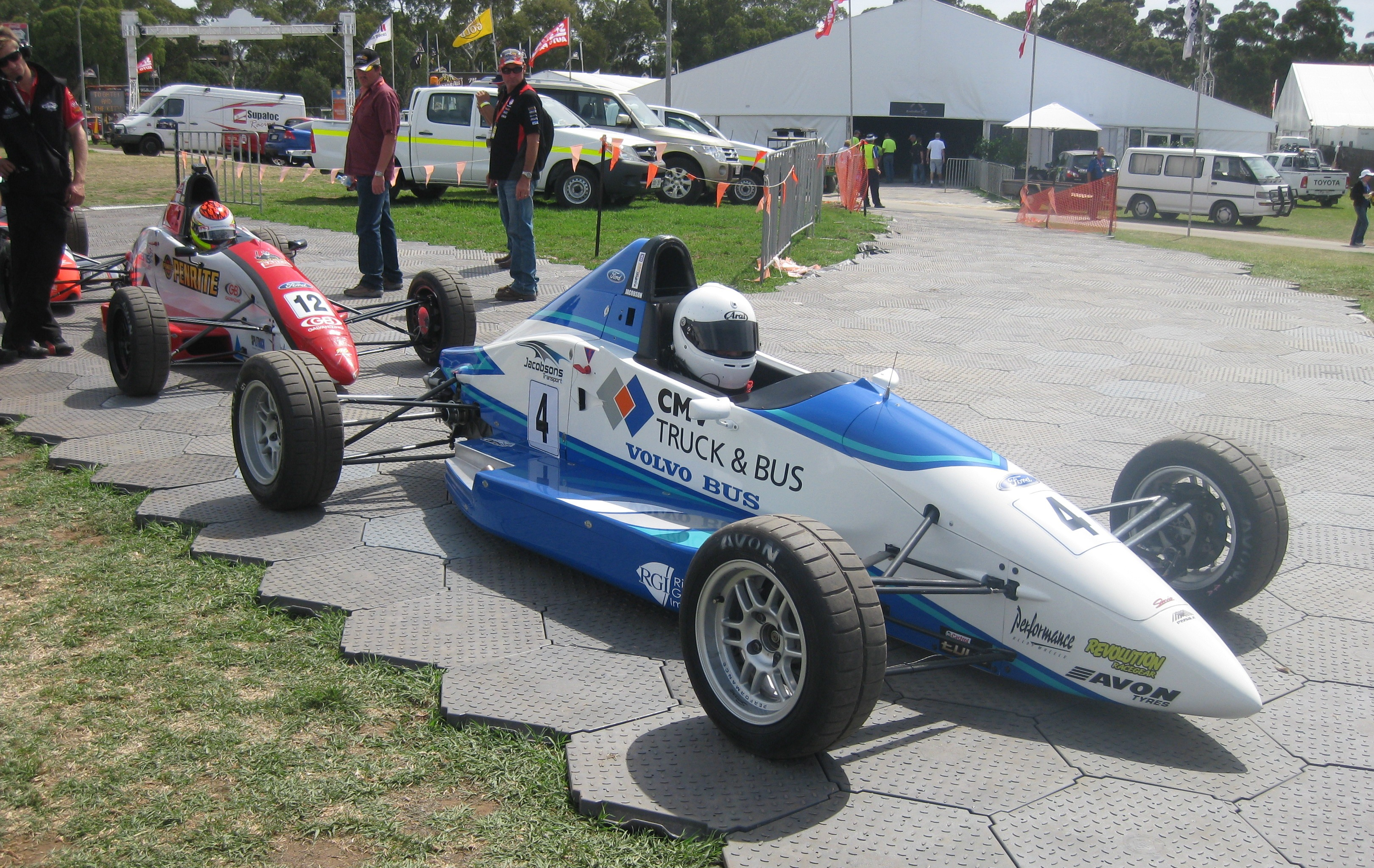
The Sonic Motor Racing Services Mygale SJ08a, as driven by Garry Jacobson at the opening round of the 2011 Australian Formula Ford Championship at the Adelaide Parklands Circuit

The team also ran Australian Carrera Cup and won the championship in 2007 giving David Reynolds his second national title. The team ran programs in the Porsche Drivers Challenge, steering Sven Burchartz to win the 2007 Porsche Drivers Challenge, then backing it up winning the 2008 Porsche GT3 Challenge that succeeded it. Sonic would not return to the national series until 2014 fielding cars for Nick McBride, Nick Foster, and Adrian Mastronardo. This lineup would return for 2015 with foster winning the championship. Ash Walsh would replace Foster for 2016. The team would enter Jordan Love and Andre Heimgartner for 2017 alongside long time driver Nick McBride with Heimgartner finishing runner up in the championship. They would step up to 5 cars for the 2018 season running Peter Major, Michael Almond, and Dale Wood alongside Love in the Pro class with a 5th entry for Graham Williams in the Pro-Am class. Sonic scaled back to 4 full time cars for 2019 with Thomas Maxwell joining Almond, Love, and Wood. Aaron love would join the team for the final round in Surfers Paradise. Jordan Love won the team's 2nd championship. For the shortened 2020 season the team would continue with Love, Almond, and Wood joined by rookie Max Vidau. The team would scale down to 3 cars for the 2021 season, running Almond, Aaron Love, & Simon Fallon.

== Supercars Development Series ==
For the 2009 season the team acquired a pair of Ford Falcons from Triple Eight Race Engineering to run for James Moffat and Bryce Washington. Washington left the team after the second round of the Fujitsu V8 Supercar Series. The team have subsequently secured a wildcard entry for the 2009 L&H 500 and 2009 Supercheap Auto Bathurst 1000, although they then did not use the entry after Washington left the team mid-season.
