= Tickford Racing =

Australian motor racing team

- Manufacturer: Ford
- Team Principal: Rod Nash; Sven Burchatz
- Team Manager: Simon Brookhouse
- Race Drivers: Supercars Championship: 5. Austin Cindric (part-time); 6. Cam Waters; 55. Thomas Randle; Super2 Series: 5. Reuben Goodall; 6. Ben Gomersall; 55. Nash Morris; 56. Campbell Logan
- Race Engineers: Supercars: 6. Sam Potter; 55. Chris Stuckey; Super2 Series: 5. TBA; 6. TBA; 55. TBA; 56. TBA
- Chassis: Supercars Championship: Ford Mustang GT S650; Super2 Series: Ford Mustang GT S550
- Debut: 2003
- Drivers' Championships: 1 (2015)
- Round wins: 29
- Race wins: 78
- 2022 position: 59
- 5/6: 3rd (4655pts); 55/56: 12th (2318pts)

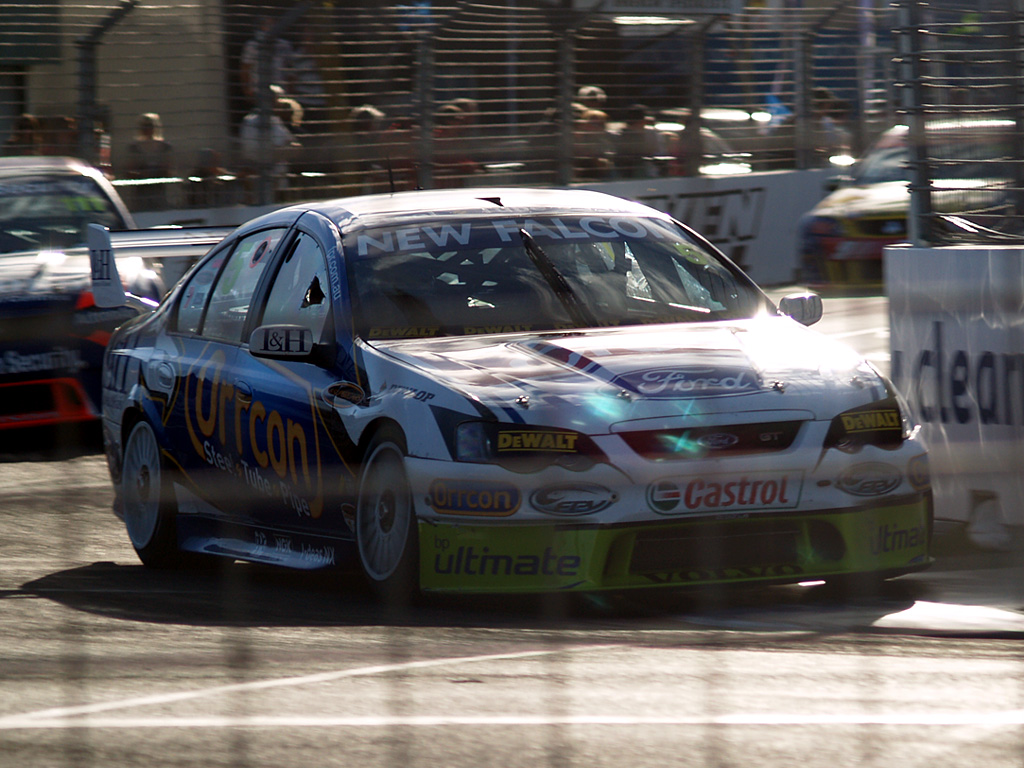
Mark Winterbottom at the 2008 Hamilton 400.

Tickford Racing (formerly known as Prodrive Racing Australia and Ford Performance Racing) is an Australian motor racing team which competes in the Supercars Championship. The team currently campaigns two Ford Mustangs, with their current drivers being Cam Waters and Thomas Randle. Tickford Racing also competes in the Super2 Series with Reuben Goodall, Ben Gomersall, Nash Morris and Campbell Logan.

The team has won the Bathurst 1000 twice, in 2013 (Winterbottom/Richards) and in 2014 (Mostert/Morris). They have won the driver's championship once, in 2015 with Mark Winterbottom.

== History ==
=== 2000s ===
In December 2002, Prodrive purchased Glenn Seton Racing, and renamed it Ford Performance Racing as part of a marketing push to link the Prodrive-owned Ford Performance Vehicles (formerly Tickford) road car range to the popular V8 Supercars. Along with this renaming came a huge expansion programme – the team expanded from one car driven by Glenn Seton to three; Seton, Craig Lowndes and David Besnard. The team moved into a new headquarters adjacent to the FPV factory in Campbellfield, Melbourne, and the crew expanded as well. The third car was entered using Rod Nash Racing's Racing Entitlement Contract (REC). While other teams such had received major Ford support in the years since, it became the first official Ford factory team since the Ford Works Team of 1962 to 1973.

The team's early years were somewhat disappointing, given the fact the team was one of the best funded in V8 Supercars. Lowndes had his moments in 2003, including a round win at Phillip Island, and a second-place finish at Bathurst driving with Seton. Lowndes finished the year 5th in the championship, with Seton and Besnard well down the order. In 2004, the team downsized to two cars. Lowndes and Seton both had disappointing years, plagued by engine dramas, a lack of test days, and a lack of comparable data (their cars were built to different specifications). While the pair did start to find some pace at the end of the year (they finished second at Bathurst again), they both decided to move at the end of the year – Lowndes to Triple Eight Race Engineering and Seton to Dick Johnson Racing.

Jason Bright and Greg Ritter joined for the 2005 season. Bright had a consistent year, and finished inside the top 10, while Ritter was disappointing, David Brabham replaced him for the final two rounds. In 2006, Mark Winterbottom joined the team. Bright scored multiple front-row starts, including three pole positions. He won the inaugural round in Bahrain, the Desert 400, and came 6th in the championship. Winterbottom enjoyed a very consistent run to finish third in the championship. The pair won the Sandown 500. FPR came second in the team's championship behind the HSV Dealer Team.

Bright left FPR at the end of the 2006 season to drive for his own Britek Motorsport outfit, with Steven Richards recruited to replace him. The team continued to take the challenge to the front-running teams. The most disappointing moment in 2007 was when Winterbottom left the circuit late in the race while leading at Bathurst. In 2008 Winterbottom challenged for the championship, but Jamie Whincup managed to finish the championship ahead of Winterbottom while Richards finished 8th.

In 2009, the new FG Falcon was debuted. While Triple Eight already had the speed, FPR struggled with only one win from Mark Winterbottom during the season with Steven Richards finishing a best of 3rd. The team also struggled at Bathurst again with the No. 6 car driven by Winterbottom and Richards caught fire on lap 50 while the second car driven by Dean Canto and Luke Youlden crashed late in the race. Mark Winterbottom and Steven Richards finished 5th and 13th in the championship.

=== 2010s ===
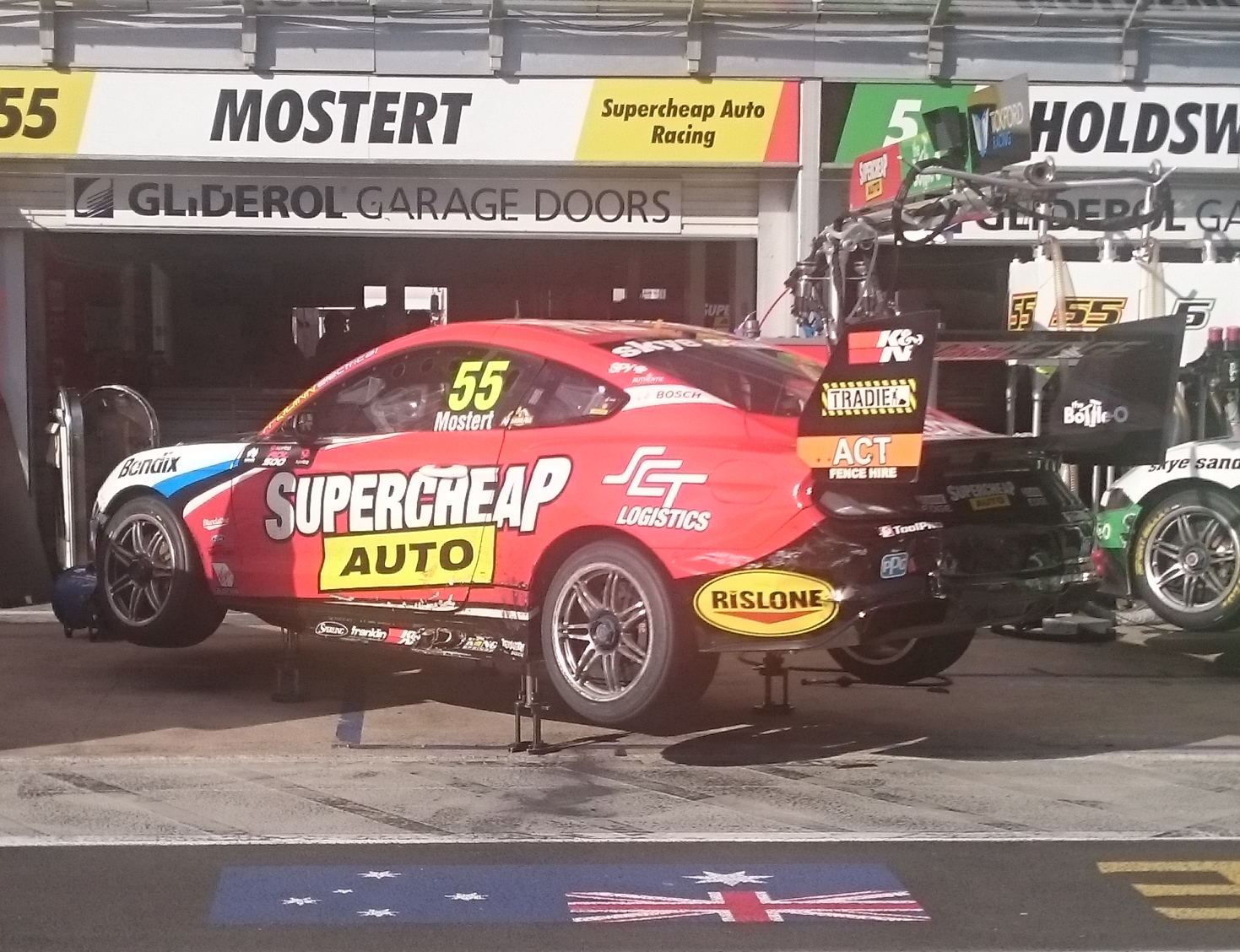
The Tickford Racing Ford Mustang GT driven by Chaz Mostert at the 2019 Adelaide 500

In 2010, Winterbottom finished 3rd and Richards 15th. For 2011, Will Davison replaced Richards, who was retained as an endurance co-driver for Winterbottom. Winterbottom finished in 3rd place for the championship while Davison finished in 7th. In 2012, FPR were strong challengers for the championship, Winterbottom finishing 3rd with Davison finishing 4th.

In January 2013, the team was sold by Prodrive to Rusty French and Rod Nash. In the 2013 season, Mark Winterbottom and Steven Richards won the Bathurst 1000. Davison finished the season in third, Winterbottom fourth. Chaz Mostert joined the team in 2014, replacing Will Davison. FPR won the 2014 Bathurst 1000 with Mostert partnered by Paul Morris.

In 2015, Ford Performance Racing was renamed as Prodrive Racing Australia, as a result of Ford's decision to progressively withdraw its FPV brand and V8 Supercars support by 2016. The team introduced the Ford FG X Falcon, the first new Falcon since 2009. After a slow start, the team achieved considerable success in the next section of the season, with eleven out of fifteen race wins between the third event (the Perth Super Sprint) and the eighth event (the Sydney Motorsport Park Super Sprint). Winterbottom, co-driving with Steve Owen, then went on to win the 2015 Wilson Security Sandown 500, leading home a team one-two with Mostert and Cam Waters in second. It was the team's first win at the event since 2006. At the 2015 Supercheap Auto Bathurst 1000, Mostert had a substantial crash in Friday qualifying, ruling his car out for the weekend and himself out for the rest of the season. This left Winterbottom with a large championship lead entering the final rounds, and while he didn't win another race after Sandown, Winterbottom held on to win his, and the team's first drivers' championship. The team was leading the teams' championship until the final round, in which it was overtaken by long-time rivals Triple Eight.

In 2016, Mostert was moved to customer team Rod Nash Racing for sponsorship purposes, with Cam Waters joining the team full-time in car No. 6 alongside defending champion Winterbottom. The team only won 2 races, both with Winterbottom who finished the championship in 6th place. Waters finished his first season in 19th, with his best finish being 4th place at the Bathurst 1000 with Jack Le Brocq. In 2017 the team continued with the same driver lineup, with its only race win being the Sandown 500 with Waters and co-driver Richie Stanaway. Winterbottom finished the championship in 6th, while Waters finished in 8th place.

In 2016, Prodrive Racing Australia management re-formed the Ford-aligned vehicle enhancer, Tickford.

In 2018, the team was rebranded as Tickford Racing, with Stanaway joining the team in car No. 56. The Rod Nash Racing REC was moved to the team with Mostert, officially making Tickford Racing a 4 car team.

== Customer cars ==
=== Rod Nash Racing ===
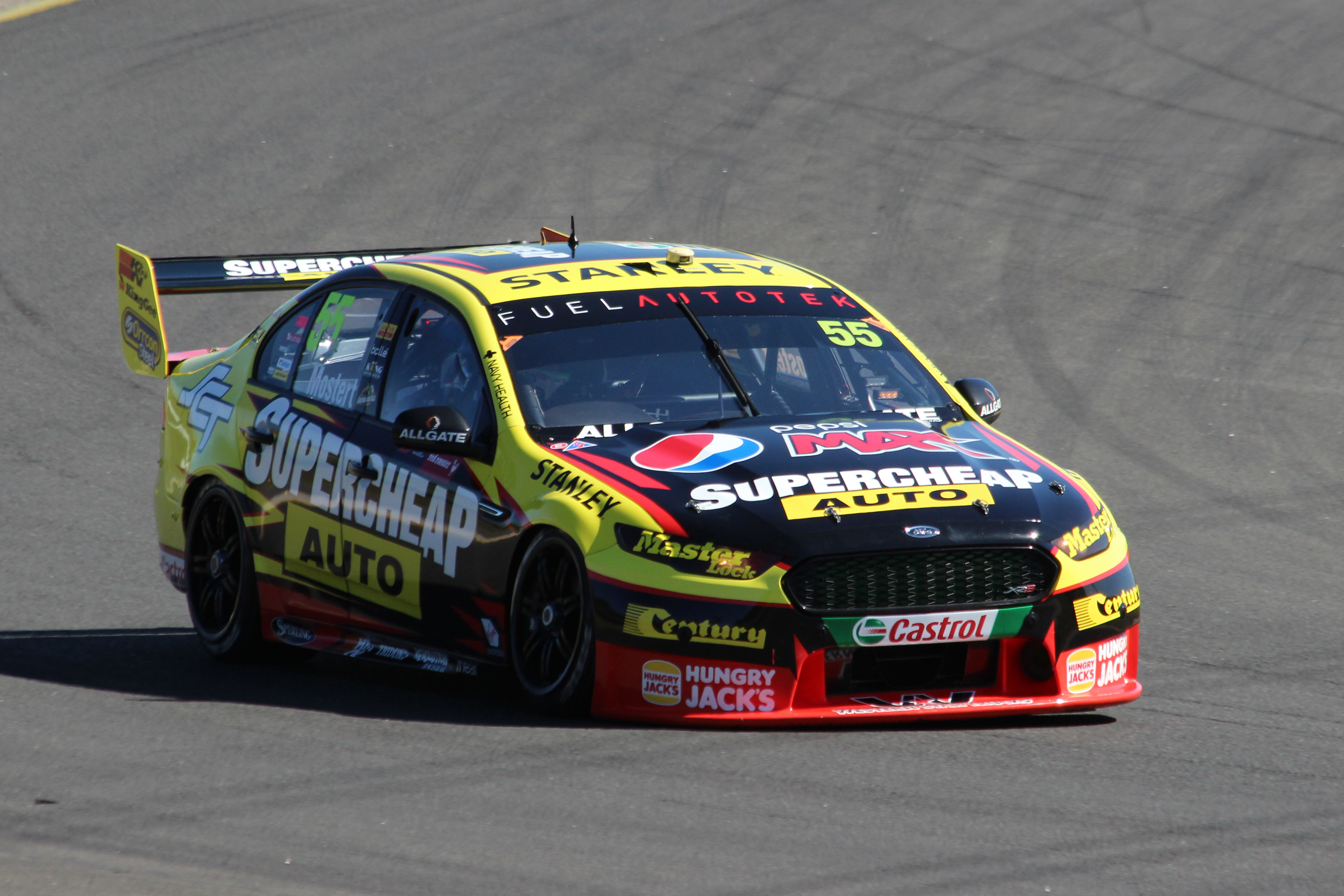
Rod Nash Racing

From 2010 to 2017, the team has prepared a customer car for Rod Nash Racing. Paul Dumbrell drove in 2010 and 2011 before David Reynolds took over in 2012, with notable results being a race win at the 2013 Armor All Gold Coast 600, a second place at the 2012 Supercheap Auto Bathurst 1000 and 3rd in the driver's championship in 2015, with Dean Canto as his co-driver. From 2016, Chaz Mostert raced with Rod Nash Racing, winning 3 races and the Pirtek Enduro Cup the following season with Steve Owen. The Rod Nash Racing REC is now run under the Tickford Racing name with Mostert and Owen.

=== Team 18 ===
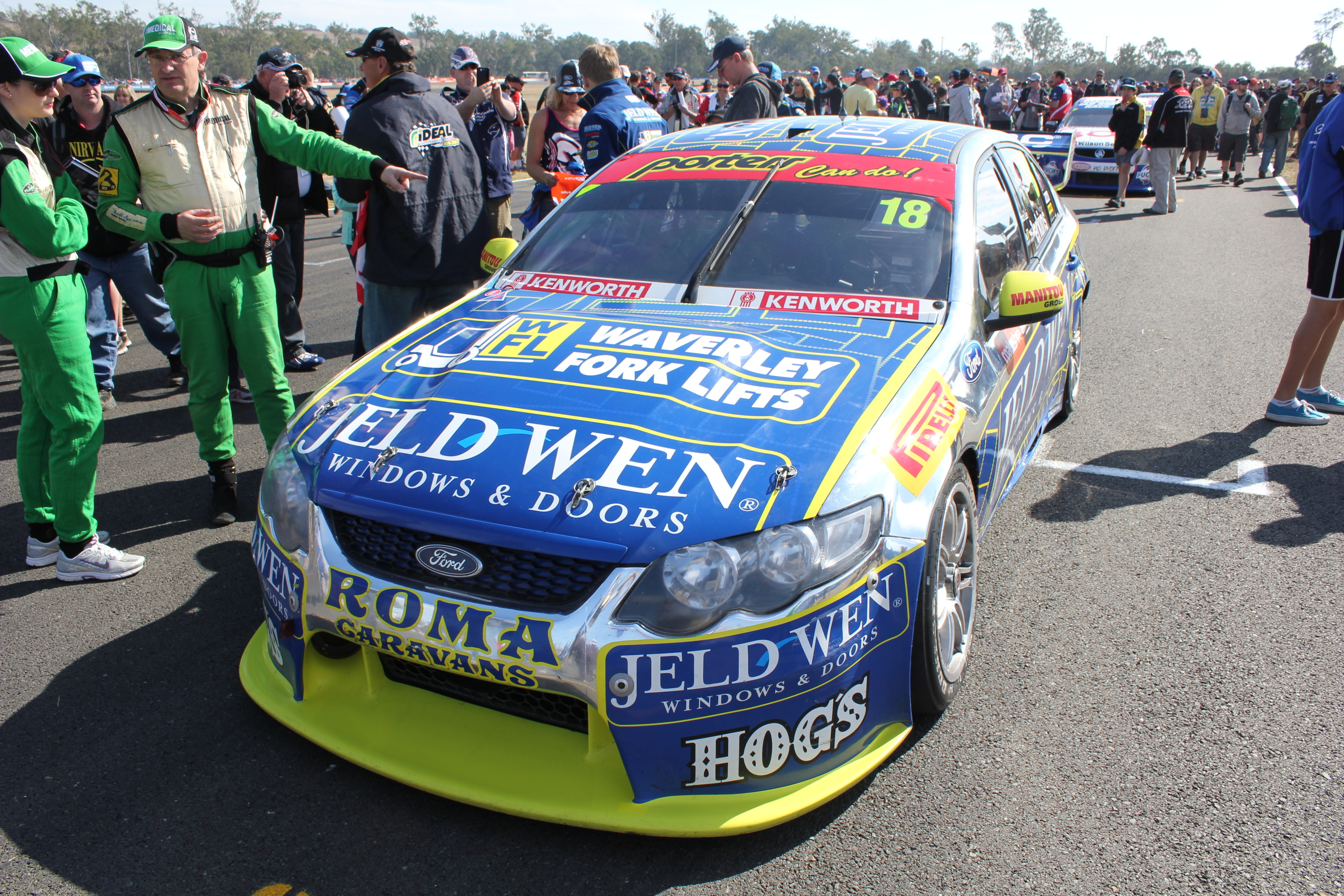
Team 18

In 2013, the team took on a second customer car for Team 18. The Schwerkolt entry was driven by Alex Davison in 2013, with Jack Perkins replacing Davison for 2014. Schwerkolt and his team split with FPR prior to the 2015 season, moving to Walkinshaw Racing for 2015.

=== Super Black Racing ===
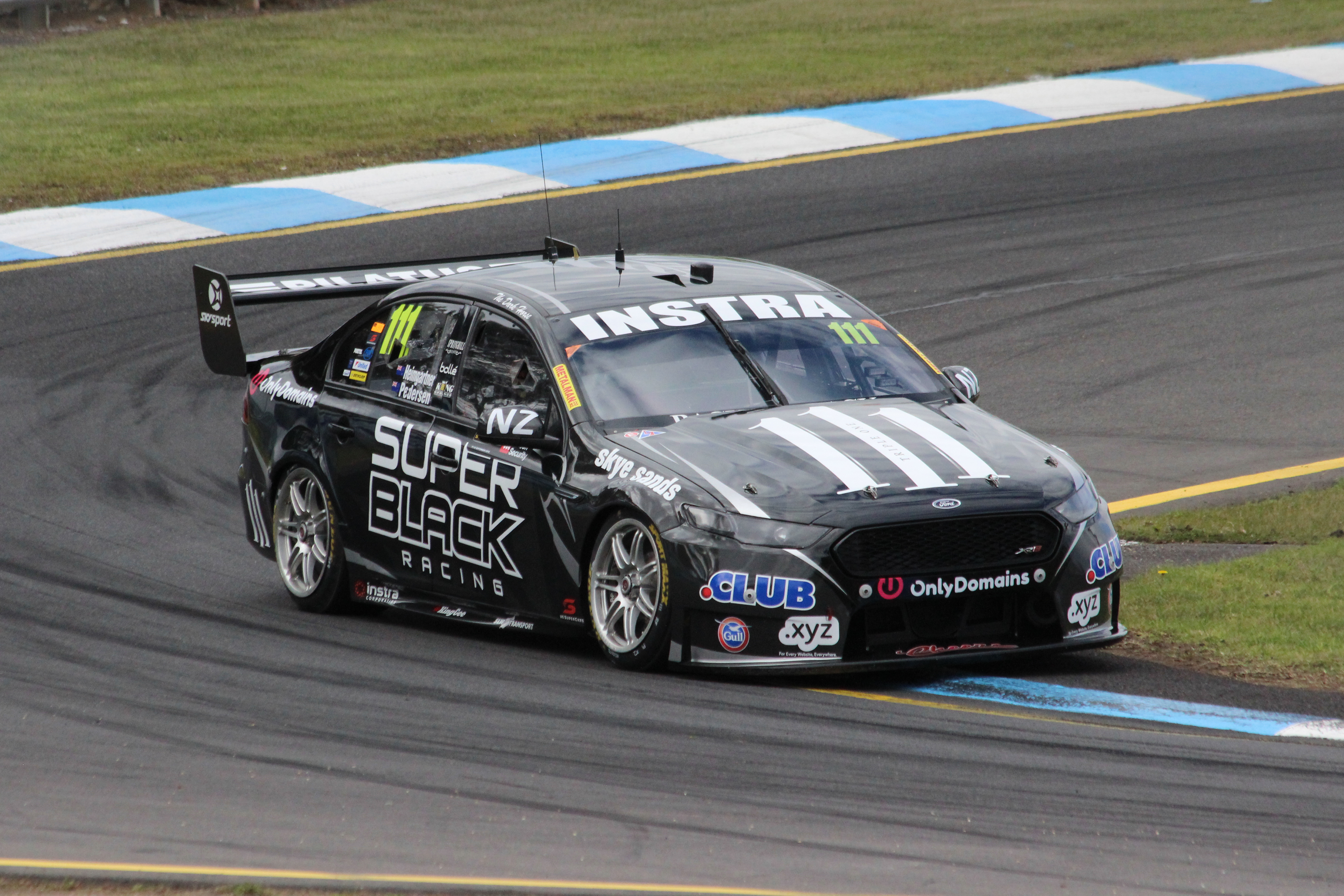
Super Black Racing

Super Black Racing replaced the No. 18 Schwerkolt entry for 2015, with Andre Heimgartner the driver of Car No. 111. Chris Pither replaced Heimgartner for the final two rounds of the 2015 season and continued with the team for 2016. After the 2016 season, the team sold its Racing Entitlement Contract to Tim Blanchard Racing.

=== Britek Motorsport ===
In 2017, Britek Motorsport replaced Super Black Racing as the team's second customer entry. Team owner Jason Bright drove the team's No. 56 entry with Garry Jacobson co-driving. After 2017, Bright retired from full-time driving and the REC was leased to Matt Stone Racing.

=== 23Red Racing ===
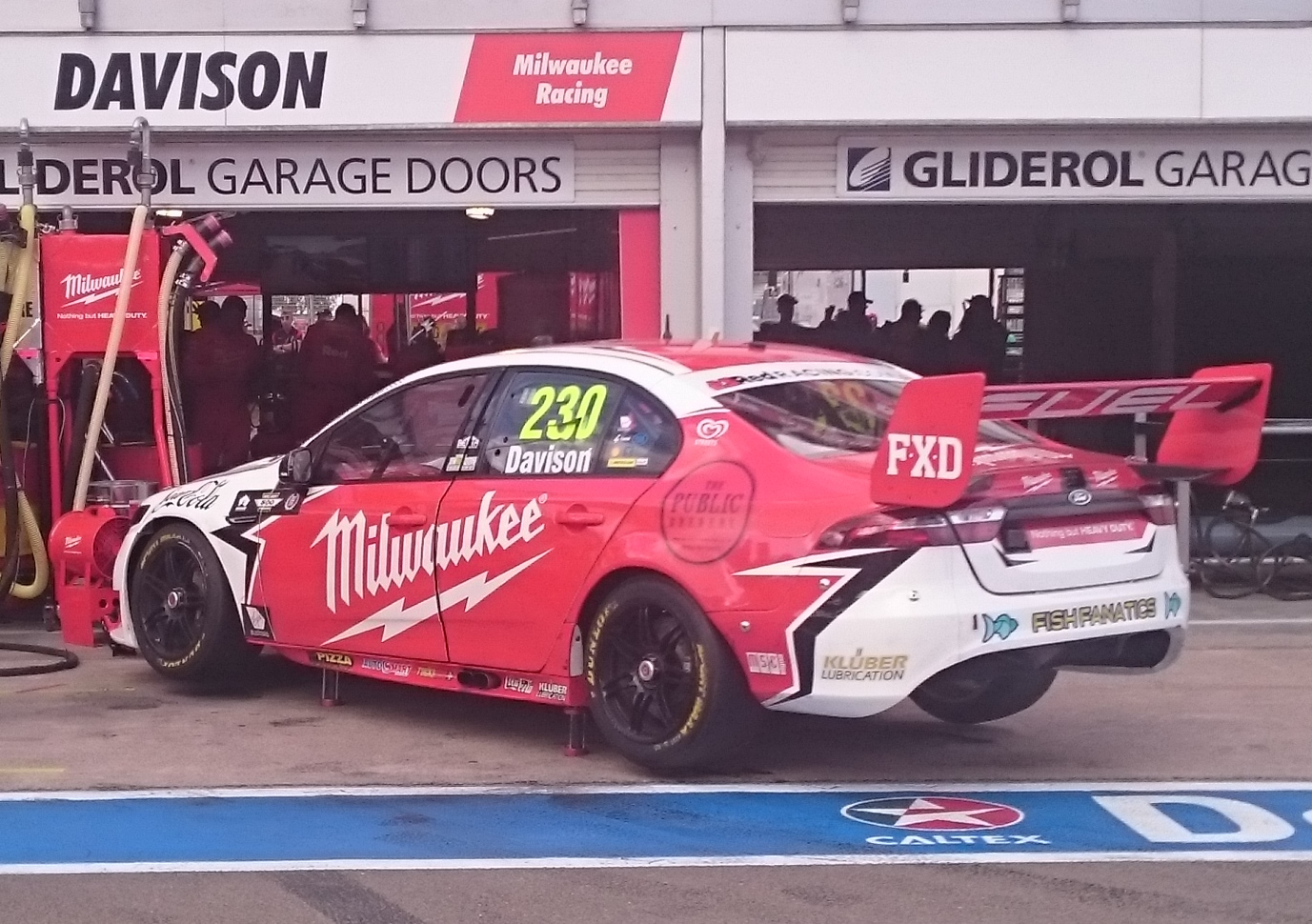
23Red Racing

After running its first Supercars season on its own, 23Red Racing became a satellite operation for 2019 with Tickford re-building the teams Ford Falcon into a Ford Mustang for the 2019 season. The car was driven by Will Davison, a former driver of FPR. In May 2020, 23Red Racing announced it was withdrawing from the Supercars Championship, due to the loss of their major backer Milwaukee Tools. This was a result of the economic impacts from the COVID-19 pandemic. The team was merged back to Tickford with a new number.

=== Other ===
Tickford Racing has run a number of customer cars for other franchise holders, the first in 2007 where the No. 021 Team Kiwi Racing BF Falcon driven by Paul Radisich was prepared for the first few rounds of the season. In 2008, FPR prepared the No. 777 Ford Rising Stars Racing BF Falcon of Michael Patrizi. For the 2015 Supercheap Auto Bathurst 1000, the team ran a third customer car, a wildcard entry for Renee Gracie and Simona de Silvestro known as the Harvey Norman Super Girls.

== Super2 Series ==
The team has also run entries in the second-tier Dunlop Super2 Series in recent years. The first of these was in 2010 when the team ran James Moffat in a BF Falcon. This was followed by entering Chaz Mostert in 2011 and 2012 using an FG Falcon. In 2014 and 2015, the team ran Cam Waters in an older generation (pre-2013) FG Falcon in the Development Series, winning the championship in 2015.

In 2016, the team expanded to two (2015-spec) FG X Falcon entries for Garry Jacobson and Jack Le Brocq. The pairing finished first and second in the championship respectively. In 2017, the team continued to run FG X Falcons, for defending champion Jacobson and Josh Kean. They also ran a wildcard entry at the Sydney round with Richie Stanaway, who achieved two 3rd-place finishes and a race win in the 4 races held. Jacobson finished the championship in 6th position while Kean finished in 19th. For 2018 and 2019 the team only fielded one FG X Falcon for Thomas Randle. In 2020, the team will field reigning Super3 champion Broc Feeney in one FG X Falcon. In 2021 the team fielded Zak Best in the same FG X Falcon used by Broc Feeney, placing 2nd in the 2021 and 2022 championships.

2023 saw the team expand back to two cars for Super3 Champion Brad Vaughan and Elly Morrow, rebranding the junior team to Tickford Autosport. The outfit also featured a one-off Super3 entry for Rylan Gray in an FGX at Adelaide. 2023 also saw the introduction of the Mustang body to the Super2 Series, with Vaughan taking chassis TR2025, previously driven by James Courtney in 2022, and Morrow in PRA1519, the wildcard chassis driven to a Supercars Series pole position at The Bend in 2022.

In 2024, Tickford Autosport again expanded to three cars, with Rylan Gray and Lochie Dalton joining a returning Brad Vaughan, completing a new chassis build for Dalton. The team enjoyed some success, including a maiden race win for Brad Vaughan, multiple pole positions and podium finishes, plus a round win at Bathurst for Rylan Gray, making him the youngest round winner in the series’ history.

2025 saw Tickford expand once again to four cars, with Reuben Goodall and Nash Morris joining Dalton and Gray, with Dalton again receiving a newly built chassis, TR31. The team also enjoyed the return of Mark Winterbottom in a mentorship role for the team, alongside co-driving duties with Cam Waters. 2025 saw unprecedented levels of success in the series. After an average start to the year at Round 1, the team went on to secure three round wins, eight of 12 race wins, six of 11 pole positions, as well as locking out three round and four race podiums. The team wrapped up the Teams Championship in the fifth round, with Dalton securing the Pole Position Award and Rylan Gray taking the championship. Tickford Autosport also finished the year with all four cars taking the top four places in the series standings.

In 2026, Tickford Autosport sees Campbell Logan and Ben Gommersel join Goodall and Morris, as Dalton secured a co-driver role with Erebus Racing and Rylan Gray earned promotion to the main series with Dick Johnson Racing.

== Results ==
=== Car No. 5 results ===
Year	Driver	No.	Make	1	2	3	4	5	6	7	8	9	10	11	12	13	14	15	16	17	18	19	20	21	22	23	24	25	26	27	28	29	30	31	32	33	34	35	36	37	38	39	40	Position	Pts
2003	Glenn Seton	5	Ford	ADE; R1; 18	ADE; R1; 10	PHI; R3; 9	EAS; R4; 26	WIN; R5; 12	BAR; R6; 14	BAR; R7; 15	BAR; R8; 18	HDV; R9; Ret	HDV; R10; 16	HDV; R11; 17	QLD; R12; Ret	ORA; R13; Ret	SAN; R14; 16	BAT; R15; 2	SUR; R16; 12	SUR; R17; 5	PUK; R18; 11	PUK; R19; 9	PUK; R20; 11	EAS; R21; 18	EAS; R22; Ret																			15th	1266
2004	Glenn Seton	5	Ford	ADE; R1; 10	ADE; R2; Ret	EAS; R3; 15	PUK; R4; 29	PUK; R5; 21	PUK; R6; 22	HDV; R7; 18	HDV; R8; 12	HDV; R9; 14	BAR; R10; Ret	BAR; R11; 21	BAR; R12; Ret	QLD; R13; 13	WIN; R14; 10	ORA; R15; DNS	ORA; R16; 21	SAN; R17; 18	BAT; R18; 2	SUR; R19; 15	SUR; R20; 19	SYM; R21; 28	SYM; R22; 19	SYM; R23; 17	EAS; R24; 14	EAS; R25; 13	EAS; R26; 22															15th	1237
2006	Mark Winterbottom	5	Ford	ADE; R1; 22	ADE; R2; 19	PUK; R3; 4	PUK; R4; 3	PUK; R5; 3	BAR; R6; 6	BAR; R7; 13	BAR; R8; 3	WIN; R9; 8	WIN; R10; 12	WIN; R11; 6	HDV; R12; 3	HDV; R13; 17	HDV; R14; 8	QLD; R15; 9	QLD; R16; 7	QLD; R17; 9	ORA; R18; 7	ORA; R19; 15	ORA; R20; 11	SAN; R21; 1	BAT; R22; Ret	SUR; R23; 3	SUR; R24; 3	SUR; R25; 3	SYM; R26; 2	SYM; R27; 2	SYM; R28; 3	BHR; R29; 8	BHR; R30; 3	BHR; R31; 27	PHI; R32; 7	PHI; R33; 2	PHI; R34; 1							3rd	3089
2007	Mark Winterbottom	5	Ford	ADE; R1; 5	ADE; R2; Ret	BAR; R3; 10	BAR; R4; 6	BAR; R5; 5	PUK; R6; 2	PUK; R7; 23	PUK; R8; 11	WIN; R9; 26	WIN; R10; 20	WIN; R11; 10	EAS; R12; 11	EAS; R13; 7	EAS; R14; 6	HDV; R15; Ret	HDV; R16; 6	HDV; R17; 6	QLD; R18; 10	QLD; R19; 7	QLD; R20; 5	ORA; R21; 4	ORA; R22; 3	ORA; R23; 24	SAN; R24; 8	BAT; R25; 10	SUR; R26; 20	SUR; R27; 17	SUR; R28; 5	BHR; R29; 1	BHR; R30; 1	BHR; R31; 3	SYM; R32; 3	SYM; R33; 3	SYM; R34; 7	PHI; R35; 7	PHI; R36; 4	PHI; R37; 5				5th	420
2008	Mark Winterbottom	5	Ford	ADE; R1; 2	ADE; R2; Ret	EAS; R3; 10	EAS; R4; 2	EAS; R5; 1	HAM; R6; 10	HAM; R7; 7	HAM; R8; 5	BAR; R29; 1	BAR; R10; 1	BAR; R11; 1	SAN; R12; 2	SAN; R13; 6	SAN; R14; 2	HDV; R15; 1	HDV; R16; 3	HDV; R17; 2	QLD; R18; 2	QLD; R19; 1	QLD; R20; 1	WIN; R21; 21	WIN; R22; 2	WIN; R23; 26	PHI; QR; 12	PHI; R24; 4	BAT; R25; 4	SUR; R26; 3	SUR; R27; 3	SUR; R28; 3	BHR; R29; 21	BHR; R30; 4	BHR; R31; 4	SYM; R32; 3	SYM; R33; 4	SYM; R34; 4	ORA; R35; 23	ORA; R36; 12	ORA; R37; 18			2nd	3079
2009	Mark Winterbottom	5	Ford	ADE; R1; 18	ADE; R2; 22	HAM; R3; 2	HAM; R4; Ret	WIN; R5; 25	WIN; R6; 2	SYM; R7; 16	SYM; R8; 4	HDV; R9; 2	HDV; R10; 17	TOW; R11; 8	TOW; R12; 6	SAN; R13; 12	SAN; R14; 16	QLD; R15; 3	QLD; R16; 4	PHI; QR; 1	PHI; R17; 3	BAT; R18; Ret	SUR; R19; 1	SUR; R20; 2	SUR; R21; 2	SUR; R22; 1	PHI; R23; 6	PHI; R24; Ret	BAR; R25; 3	BAR; R26; 17	SYD; R27; 2	SYD; R28; 3												5th	2414
2010	Mark Winterbottom	5	Ford	YMC; R1; 3	YMC; R2; 2	BHR; R3; 2	BHR; R4; 2	ADE; R5; 21	ADE; R6; 3	HAM; R7; 7	HAM; R8; DSQ	QLD; R9; 9	QLD; R10; Ret	WIN; R11; 15	WIN; R12; 6	HDV; R13; 1	HDV; R14; 2	TOW; R15; 3	TOW; R16; 1	PHI; QR; 7	PHI; R17; 2	BAT; R18; 9	SUR; R19; 21	SUR; R20; 3	SYM; R21; 5	SYM; R22; 1	SAN; R23; 3	SAN; R24; 2	SYD; R25; Ret	SYD; R26; Ret														3rd	2729
2011	Mark Winterbottom	5	Ford	YMC; R1; 3	YMC; R2; 14	ADE; R3; 6	ADE; R4; 3	HAM; R5; 4	HAM; R6; Ret	BAR; R7; 8	BAR; R8; 13	BAR; R9; 26	WIN; R10; 9	WIN; R11; 19	HID; R12; 15	HID; R13; 3	TOW; R14; 5	TOW; R15; 3	QLD; R16; 13	QLD; R17; 10	QLD; R18; 19	PHI; R19; 17	BAT; R20; 4	SUR; R21; 3	SUR; R22; 1	SYM; R23; 4	SYM; R24; 3	SAN; R25; 7	SAN; R26; 2	SYD; R27; 5	SYD; R28; 1													3rd	2710
2012	Mark Winterbottom	5	Ford	ADE; R1; 9	ADE; R2; 2	SYM; R3; 2	SYM; R4; 5	HAM; R5; 23	HAM; R6; 1	BAR; R7; 1	BAR; R8; 3	BAR; R9; 2	PHI; R10; 1	PHI; R11; 6	HID; R12; 3	HID; R13; 3	TOW; R14; 2	TOW; R15; 5	QLD; R16; 2	QLD; R17; 2	SMP; R18; 2	SMP; R19; 3	SAN; QR; 16	SAN; R20; 2	BAT; R21; 11	SUR; R22; 3	SUR; R23; 3	YMC; R24; 6	YMC; R25; 4	YMC; R26; 5	WIN; R27; 4	WIN; R28; 2	SYD; R29; 9	SYD; R30; 18										3rd	3457
2013	Mark Winterbottom	5	Ford	ADE; R1; Ret	ADE; R2; 5	SYM; R3; 3	SYM; R4; 6	SYM; R5; 2	PUK; R6; 19	PUK; R7; 13	PUK; R8; 23	PUK; R9; 24	BAR; R10; 3	BAR; R11; 3	BAR; R12; 12	COA; R13; 8	COA; R14; 6	COA; R15; 7	COA; R16; 6	HID; R17; 22	HID; R18; 1	HID; R19; 2	TOW; R20; 2	TOW; R21; 4	QLD; R22; 3	QLD; R23; 10	QLD; R24; 3	WIN; R25; 4	WIN; R26; 1	WIN; R27; 17	SAN; QR; 4	SAN; R28; 6	BAT; R29; 1	SUR; R30; 3	SUR; R31; 18	PHI; R32; 5	PHI; R33; 7	PHI; R34; 2	SYD; R35; Ret	SYD; R36; 6				4th	2793
2014	Mark Winterbottom	5	Ford	ADE; R1; 4	ADE; R2; 4	ADE; R3; 12	SYM; R4; 3	SYM; R5; 2	SYM; R6; 9	WIN; R7; 7	WIN; R8; 2	WIN; R9; 1	PUK; R10; 13	PUK; R11; 1	PUK; R12; 2	PUK; R13; 1	BAR; R14; 4	BAR; R15; 2	BAR; R16; 3	HID; R17; 6	HID; R18; 6	HID; R19; 1	TOW; R20; 11	TOW; R21; 8	TOW; R22; 6	QLD; R23; 6	QLD; R24; 6	QLD; R25; 22	SMP; R26; 11	SMP; R27; 12	SMP; R28; 20	SAN; QR; 3	SAN; R29; 10	BAT; R30; 6	SUR; R31; 4	SUR; R32; 13	PHI; R33; 23	PHI; R34; 3	PHI; R35; 3	SYD; R36; 23	SYD; R37; 5	SYD; R38; 19		3rd	2768
2015	Mark Winterbottom	5	Ford	ADE; R1; 5	ADE; R2; 11	ADE; R3; 5	SYM; R4; 2	SYM; R5; 6	SYM; R6; 5	BAR; R7; 1	BAR; R8; 1	BAR; R9; 15	WIN; R10; 2	WIN; R11; 1	WIN; R12; 1	HID; R13; 2	HID; R14; 7	HID; R15; 5	TOW; R16; 1	TOW; R17; 1	QLD; R18; 1	QLD; R19; 1	QLD; R20; 3	SMP; R21; 2	SMP; R22; 8	SMP; R23; 16	SAN; QR; 2	SAN; R24; 1	BAT; R25; 2	SUR; R26; 23	SUR; R27; 11	PUK; R28; 7	PUK; R29; 4	PUK; R30; 11	PHI; R31; 7	PHI; R32; 4	PHI; R33; 4	SYD; R34; 5	SYD; R35; 3	SYD; R36; 4				1st	3246
2016	Mark Winterbottom	1	Ford	ADE; R1; 8	ADE; R2; 11	ADE; R3; 9	SYM; R4; 9	SYM; R5; 3	PHI; R6; 5	PHI; R7; 2	BAR; R8; 22	BAR; R9; 1	WIN; R10; 3	WIN; R11; 2	HID; R12; 9	HID; R13; 20	TOW; R14; 3	TOW; R15; 3	QLD; R16; 4	QLD; R17; 5	SMP; R18; 11	SMP; R19; 14	SAN; QR; 22	SAN; R20; 23	BAT; R21; Ret	SUR; R22; 4	SUR; R23; 5	PUK; R24; 4	PUK; R25; 5	PUK; R26; 1	PUK; R27; 5	SYD; R28; 23	SYD; R29; 12											6th	2489
2017	Mark Winterbottom	5	Ford	ADE; R1; 15	ADE; R2; 14	SYM; R3; 7	SYM; R4; 13	PHI; R5; 8	PHI; R6; 2	BAR; R7; 5	BAR; R8; 4	WIN; R9; 9	WIN; R10; 13	HID; R11; 14	HID; R12; 14	TOW; R13; 3	TOW; R14; 4	QLD; R15; 9	QLD; R16; 10	SMP; R17; 4	SMP; R18; 19	SAN; QR; 9	SAN; R19; 9	BAT; R20; Ret	SUR; R21; 8	SUR; R22; 5	PUK; R23; 2	PUK; R24; 19	NEW; R25; 17	NEW; R26; 7														6th	2208
2018	Mark Winterbottom	5	Ford	ADE; R1; 5	ADE; R2; 13	MEL; R3; 14	MEL; R4; 9	MEL; R5; 7	MEL; R6; 17	SYM; R7; 14	SYM; R8; 12	PHI; R9; 13	PHI; R10; 15	BAR; R11; 2	BAR; R12; 21	WIN; R13; 10	WIN; R14; 20	HID; R15; 20	HID; R16; 13	TOW; R17; 6	TOW; R18; 12	QLD; R19; 20	QLD; R20; 26	SMP; R21; 15	BEN; R22; 5	BEN; R23; 16	SAN; QR; 5	SAN; R24; 17	BAT; R25; 12	SUR; R26; 7	SUR; R27; C	PUK; R28; 13	PUK; R29; 9	NEW; R30; 6	NEW; R31; 13									12th	2192
2019	Lee Holdsworth	5	Ford	ADE; R1; 21	ADE; R2; 11	MEL; R3; 9	MEL; R4; 12	MEL; R5; 12	MEL; R6; 9	SYM; R7; 13	SYM; R8; 9	PHI; R9; 15	PHI; R10; 14	BAR; R11; 9	BAR; R12; 9	WIN; R13; 22	WIN; R14; 5	HID; R15; 6	HID; R16; 7	TOW; R17; 10	TOW; R18; 8	QLD; R19; 7	QLD; R20; 14	BEN; R21; 13	BEN; R22; 9	PUK; R23; 5	PUK; R24; 15	BAT; R25; 9	SUR; R26; 6	SUR; R27; 6	SAN; QR; 7	SAN; R28; 3	NEW; R29; 12	NEW; R30; 23										10th	2428
2020	Lee Holdsworth	5	Ford	ADE; R1; 12	ADE; R2; 6	MEL; R3; C	MEL; R4; C	MEL; R5; C	MEL; R6; C	SMP1; R7; 7	SMP1; R8; 13	SMP1; R9; 2	SMP2; R10; 2	SMP2; R11; 19	SMP2; R12; 15	HID1; R13; 10	HID1; R14; 14	HID1; R15; 12	HID2; R16; 7	HID2; R17; 8	HID2; R18; 12	TOW1; R19; 13	TOW1; R20; 11	TOW1; R21; 9	TOW2; R22; 16	TOW2; R23; 8	TOW2; R24; 10	BEN1; R25; 12	BEN1; R26; 23	BEN1; R27; 11	BEN2; R28; 13	BEN2; R29; Ret	BEN2; R30; 9	BAT; R31; 7										11th	1553
2021	Jack Le Brocq	5	Ford	BAT; R1; 6	BAT; R2; 19	SAN; R3; 10	SAN; R4; 12	SAN; R5; 16	SYM; R6; 12	SYM; R7; 21	SYM; R8; 19	BEN; R9; 10	BEN; R10; 12	BEN; R11; 22	HID; R12; 20	HID; R13; 11	HID; R14; 15	TOW; R15; 15	TOW; R16; 10	TOW2; R17; 14	TOW2; R18; 18	TOW2; R19; 13	SYD1; R20; 21	SYD1; R21; 14	SYD1; R22; 8	SYD2; R23; 6	SYD2; R24; 18	SYD2; R25; 14	SYD3; R26; 19	SYD3; R27; 14	SYD3; R28; 10	SYD4; R29; 11	SYD4; R30; C	BAT; R31; 15										16th	1486
2022	James Courtney	5	Ford	SMP; R1; 10	SMP; R2; 17	SYM; R3; 12	SYM; R4; 8	SYM; R5; 9	MEL; R6; 20	MEL; R7; 9	MEL; R8; 9	MEL; R9; 22	BAR; R10; 7	BAR; R11; 7	BAR; R12; 2	WIN; R13; 13	WIN; R14; 8	WIN; R15; 27	HID; R16; 9	HID; R17; Ret	HID; R18; 19	TOW; R19; 20	TOW; R20; 4	BEN; R21; 14	BEN; R22; 3	BEN; R23; 12	SAN; R24; 6	SAN; R25; 13	SAN; R26; 12	PUK; R27; 18	PUK; R28; 16	PUK; R29; Ret	BAT; R30; Ret	SUR; R31; 8	SUR; R32; 17	ADE; R33; 3	ADE; R34; 17							12th	1748
2023	James Courtney	5	Ford	NEW; R1; 8	NEW; R2; DNS	MEL; R3; 9	MEL; R4; 22	MEL; R5; Ret	MEL; R6; DNS	BAR; R7; 5	BAR; R8; 3	BAR; R9; 9	SYM; R10; 24	SYM; R11; 16	SYM; R12; 22	HID; R13; 23	HID; R14; 16	HID; R15; 21	TOW; R16; 9	TOW; R17; 16	SMP; R18; 13	SMP; R19; 13	BEN; R20; 8	BEN; R21; 11	BEN; R22; 8	SAN; R23; 12	BAT; R24; 6	SUR; R25; 10	SUR; R26; Ret	ADE; R27; 7	ADE; R28; 12													17th	1568

=== Car No. 6 results ===
Year	Driver	No.	Make	1	2	3	4	5	6	7	8	9	10	11	12	13	14	15	16	17	18	19	20	21	22	23	24	25	26	27	28	29	30	31	32	33	34	35	36	37	38	39	40	Position	Pts
2003	Craig Lowndes	6	Ford	ADE; R1; Ret	ADE; R1; 7	PHI; R3; 1	EAS; R4; 2	WIN; R5; 10	BAR; R6; 6	BAR; R7; Ret	BAR; R8; 17	HDV; R9; 28	HDV; R10; 27	HDV; R11; 15	QLD; R12; 6	ORA; R13; 2	SAN; R14; 16	BAT; R15; 2	SUR; R16; 15	SUR; R17; 9	PUK; R18; 16	PUK; R19; 12	PUK; R20; 18	EAS; R21; 6	EAS; R22; 4																			5th	1756
2004	Craig Lowndes	6	Ford	ADE; R1; Ret	ADE; R2; Ret	EAS; R3; 2	PUK; R4; 8	PUK; R5; 29	PUK; R6; Ret	HDV; R7; 12	HDV; R8; 5	HDV; R9; 9	BAR; R10; 21	BAR; R11; Ret	BAR; R12; DNS	QLD; R13; Ret	WIN; R14; 27	ORA; R15; 19	ORA; R16; 26	SAN; R17; 18	BAT; R18; 2	SUR; R19; 4	SUR; R20; Ret	SYM; R21; 6	SYM; R22; 6	SYM; R23; 13	EAS; R24; 2	EAS; R25; 3	EAS; R26; Ret															20th	1182
2005	Jason Bright	6	Ford	ADE; R1; 19	ADE; R2; 11	PUK; R3; 7	PUK; R4; 11	PUK; R5; 7	BAR; R6; 16	BAR; R7; 7	BAR; R8; 22	EAS; R9; 33	EAS; R10; 23	SHA; R11; 7	SHA; R12; 20	SHA; R13; 6	HDV; R14; Ret	HDV; R15; 9	HDV; R16; 8	QLD; R17; 9	ORA; R18; 7	ORA; R19; 7	SAN; R20; 6	BAT; R21; 14	SUR; R22; 8	SUR; R23; 9	SUR; R24; 9	SYM; R25; 7	SYM; R26; 17	SYM; R27; 16	PHI; R28; 31	PHI; R29; 13	PHI; R30; 7											9th	1566
2006	Jason Bright	6	Ford	ADE; R1; 25	ADE; R2; 15	PUK; R3; 3	PUK; R4; 20	PUK; R5; 20	BAR; R6; 5	BAR; R7; Ret	BAR; R8; 28	WIN; R9; 1	WIN; R10; 20	WIN; R11; 2	HDV; R12; 24	HDV; R13; 1	HDV; R14; 4	QLD; R15; 2	QLD; R16; 8	QLD; R17; 3	ORA; R18; 4	ORA; R19; 18	ORA; R20; Ret	SAN; R21; 1	BAT; R22; Ret	SUR; R23; 7	SUR; R24; 6	SUR; R25; 4	SYM; R26; 1	SYM; R27; 3	SYM; R28; 2	BHR; R29; 1	BHR; R30; 2	BHR; R31; 2	PHI; R32; 10	PHI; R33; 8	PHI; R34; 4							5th	2868
2007	Steven Richards	6	Ford	ADE; R1; 11	ADE; R2; 8	BAR; R3; 22	BAR; R4; 13	BAR; R5; 9	PUK; R6; 5	PUK; R7; 18	PUK; R8; 12	WIN; R9; 2	WIN; R10; 16	WIN; R11; 12	EAS; R12; 6	EAS; R13; 6	EAS; R14; 7	HDV; R15; 7	HDV; R16; 9	HDV; R17; 8	QLD; R18; 13	QLD; R19; Ret	QLD; R20; Ret	ORA; R21; 5	ORA; R22; 6	ORA; R23; 5	SAN; R24; 3	BAT; R25; 10	SUR; R26; Ret	SUR; R27; 5	SUR; R28; 1	BHR; R29; 25	BHR; R30; 6	BHR; R31; 25	SYM; R32; 4	SYM; R33; 2	SYM; R34; 2	PHI; R35; 27	PHI; R36; 12	PHI; R37; 9				7th	380
2008	Steven Richards	6	Ford	ADE; R1; 5	ADE; R2; 15	EAS; R3; 27	EAS; R4; 7	EAS; R5; Ret	HAM; R6; 3	HAM; R7; 2	HAM; R8; 2	BAR; R9; 4	BAR; R10; 7	BAR; R11; 9	SAN; R12; 23	SAN; R13; 16	SAN; R14; 9	HDV; R15; 2	HDV; R16; 2	HDV; R17; 1	QLD; R18; 7	QLD; R19; 7	QLD; R20; 11	WIN; R21; 5	WIN; R22; 24	WIN; R23; Ret	PHI; Q 9	PHI; R24; 4	BAT; R25; 4	SUR; R26; 11	SUR; R27; 12	SUR; R28; 8	BHR; R29; 8	BHR; R30; 5	BHR; R31; 9	SYM; R32; Ret	SYM; R33; Ret	SYM; R34; 17	ORA; R35; 4	ORA; R36; 3	ORA; R37; 17			8th	2416
2009	Steven Richards	6	Ford	ADE; R1; Ret	ADE; R2; 9	HAM; R3; 15	HAM; R4; 12	WIN; R5; 3	WIN; R6; 16	SYM; R7; 15	SYM; R8; 15	HDV; R9; 21	HDV; R10; 14	TOW; R11; 21	TOW; R12; 20	SAN; R13; 14	SAN; R14; 12	QLD; R15; 11	QLD; R16; 7	PHI; Q 1	PHI; R17; 3	BAT; R18; Ret	SUR; R19; 7	SUR; R20; 6	SUR; R21; 12	SUR; R22; Ret	PHI; R23; 17	PHI; R24; 14	BAR; R25; 23	BAR; R26; 8	SYD; R27; 8	SYD; R28; 15												13th	1780
2010	Steven Richards	6	Ford	YMC; R1; 16	YMC; R2; 17	BHR; R3; Ret	BHR; R4; 15	ADE; R5; 17	ADE; R6; 13	HAM; R7; 24	HAM; R8; DSQ	QLD; R9; 27	QLD; R10; 9	WIN; R11; 14	WIN; R12; 21	HDV; R13; Ret	HDV; R14; 10	TOW; R15; 9	TOW; R16; 5	PHI; R17; 21	BAT; R18; 11	SUR; R19; Ret	SUR; R20; 13	SYM; R21; 8	SYM; R22; 9	SAN; R23; 12	SAN; R24; 15	SYD; R25; 11	SYD; R26; 2															15th	1630
2011	Will Davison	6	Ford	YMC; R1; 12	YMC; R2; 16	ADE; R3; 9	ADE; R4; 7	HAM; R5; 6	HAM; R6; 4	BAR; R7; 3	BAR; R8; 8	BAR; R9; 15	WIN; R10; 13	WIN; R11; 24	HID; R12; 5	HID; R13; 7	TOW; R14; 3	TOW; R15; 18	QLD; R16; 15	QLD; R17; 15	QLD; R18; 21	PHI; Q 1	PHI; R19; 3	BAT; R20; 18	SUR; R21; 2	SUR; R22; 14	SYM; R23; 5	SYM; R24; 2	SAN; R25; 4	SAN; R26; 3	SYD; R27; Ret	SYD; R28; Ret												7th	2345
2012	Will Davison	6	Ford	ADE; R1; 2	ADE; R2; 1	SYM; R3; 1	SYM; R4; 3	HAM; R5; 1	HAM; R6; 3	BAR; R7; 25	BAR; R8; 1	BAR; R9; 1	PHI; R10; Ret	PHI; R11; 1	HID; R12; 2	HID; R13; 6	TOW; R14; 12	TOW; R15; 3	QLD; R16; 6	QLD; R17; 4	SMP; R18; 3	SMP; R19; 5	SAN; Q 27	SAN; R20; 17	BAT; R21; 24	SUR; R22; 18	SUR; R23; 1	YMC; R24; 2	YMC; R25; 2	YMC; R26; 2	WIN; R27; Ret	WIN; R28; 11	SYD; R29; 19	SYD; R30; 1										4th	3049
2013	Will Davison	6	Ford	ADE; R1; 2	ADE; R2; 6	SYM; R3; 6	SYM; R4; 5	SYM; R5; 6	PUK; R6; 7	PUK; R7; 2	PUK; R8; 1	PUK; R9; 5	BAR; R10; 14	BAR; R11; 5	BAR; R12; 4	COA; R13; 4	COA; R14; 9	COA; R15; 12	COA; R16; Ret	HID; R17; Ret	HID; R18; 4	HID; R19; 7	TOW; R20; 1	TOW; R21; 10	QLD; R22; 6	QLD; R23; 9	QLD; R24; 2	WIN; R25; 6	WIN; R26; 7	WIN; R27; 6	SAN; QR; 1	SAN; R28; 3	BAT; R29; 7	SUR; R30; 6	SUR; R31; 9	PHI; R32; 17	PHI; R33; 8	PHI; R34; 6	SYD; R35; 5	SYD; R36; 7				3rd	2799
2014	Chaz Mostert	6	Ford	ADE; R1; Ret	ADE; R2; 6	ADE; R3; Ret	SYM; R4; 13	SYM; R5; 18	SYM; R6; 14	WIN; R7; 12	WIN; R8; 10	WIN; R9; 6	PUK; R10; 21	PUK; R11; 3	PUK; R12; 16	PUK; R13; 3	BAR; R14; 3	BAR; R15; 6	BAR; R16; 1	HID; R17; 14	HID; R18; 14	HID; R19; 15	TOW; R20; 13	TOW; R21; 5	TOW; R22; 7	QLD; R23; 14	QLD; R24; 3	QLD; R25; 3	SMP; R26; 13	SMP; R27; 2	SMP; R28; 10	SAN; QR; 17	SAN; R29; 7	BAT; R30; 1	SUR; R31; 6	SUR; R32; 17	PHI; R33; 14	PHI; R34; 9	PHI; R35; 16	SYD; R36; 15	SYD; R37; 15	SYD; R38; 5		7th	2451
2015	Chaz Mostert	6	Ford	ADE; R1; 2	ADE; R2; Ret	ADE; R3; Ret	SYM; R4; 5	SYM; R5; 12	SYM; R6; 2	BAR; R7; 2	BAR; R8; 4	BAR; R9; 4	WIN; R10; 1	WIN; R11; 3	WIN; R12; 25	HID; R13; 1	HID; R14; 3	HID; R15; 2	TOW; R16; 8	TOW; R17; 6	QLD; R18; 5	QLD; R19; 3	QLD; R20; 1	SMP; R21; 1	SMP; R22; 3	SMP; R23; 1	SAN; QR; 3	SAN; R24; 2	BAT; R25; DNS	SUR; R26	SUR; R27	PUK; R28	PUK; R29	PUK; R30	PHI; R31	PHI; R32	PHI; R33	SYD; R34	SYD; R35	SYD; R36				11th	2017
2015	Cam Waters	6	Ford	ADE; R1	ADE; R2	ADE; R3	SYM; R4	SYM; R5	SYM; R6	BAR; R7	BAR; R8	BAR; R9	WIN; R10	WIN; R11	WIN; R12	HID; R13	HID; R14	HID; R15	TOW; R16	TOW; R17	QLD; R18	QLD; R19	QLD; R20	SMP; R21	SMP; R22	SMP; R23	SAN; QR	SAN; R24	BAT; R25	SUR; R26; 17	SUR; R27; 19	PUK; R28; 17	PUK; R29; 12	PUK; R30; 22	PHI; R31; 9	PHI; R32; 15	PHI; R33; 20	SYD; R34	SYD; R35	SYD; R36				32nd	595
2015	Steve Owen	6	Ford	ADE; R1	ADE; R2	ADE; R3	SYM; R4	SYM; R5	SYM; R6	BAR; R7	BAR; R8	BAR; R9	WIN; R10	WIN; R11	WIN; R12	HID; R13	HID; R14	HID; R15	TOW; R16	TOW; R17	QLD; R18	QLD; R19	QLD; R20	SMP; R21	SMP; R22	SMP; R23	SAN; QR	SAN; R24	BAT; R25	SUR; R26	SUR; R27	PUK; R28	PUK; R29	PUK; R30	PHI; R31	PHI; R32	PHI; R33	SYD; R34; 20	SYD; R35; Ret	SYD; R36; Ret				29th	706
2016	Cam Waters	6	Ford	ADE; R1; 15	ADE; R2; 12	ADE; R3; 4	SYM; R4; 7	SYM; R5; Ret	PHI; R6; 18	PHI; R7; 23	BAR; R8; 13	BAR; R9; 26	WIN; R10; 16	WIN; R11; 5	HID; R12; 24	HID; R13; 22	TOW; R14; 16	TOW; R15; 6	QLD; R16; Ret	QLD; R17; 16	SMP; R18; 20	SMP; R19; 16	SAN; QR; 26	SAN; R20; Ret	BAT; R21; 4	SUR; R22; Ret	SUR; R23; 14	PUK; R24; 12	PUK; R25; 17	PUK; R26; 20	PUK; R27; 17	SYD; R28; 21	SYD; R29; Ret											19th	1423
2017	Cam Waters	6	Ford	ADE; R1; 4	ADE; R2; 8	SYM; R3; 10	SYM; R4; 6	PHI; R5; 19	PHI; R6; 6	BAR; R7; 19	BAR; R8; 12	WIN; R9; 22	WIN; R10; 4	HID; R11; 6	HID; R12; 9	TOW; R13; 5	TOW; R14; 14	QLD; R15; 16	QLD; R16; 8	SMP; R17; 17	SMP; R18; Ret	SAN; QR; 1	SAN; R19; 1	BAT; R20; 16	SUR; R21; 2	SUR; R22; 21	PUK; R23; 9	PUK; R24; 3	NEW; R25; 13	NEW; R26; 23														8th	2173
2018	Cam Waters	6	Ford	ADE; R1; 16	ADE; R2; 5	MEL; R3; 11	MEL; R4; 5	MEL; R5; 9	MEL; R6; 22	SYM; R7; 20	SYM; R8; 13	PHI; R9; 16	PHI; R10; 17	BAR; R11; 6	BAR; R12; 13	WIN; R13; Ret	WIN; R14; 26	HID; R15; 12	HID; R16; 25	TOW; R17; 8	TOW; R18; 9	QLD; R19; 22	QLD; R20; 17	SMP; R21; 19	BEN; R22; 13	BEN; R23; 15	SAN; QR; 13	SAN; R24; 13	BAT; R25; 23	SUR; R26; 8	SUR; R27; C	PUK; R28; 7	PUK; R29; 12	NEW; R30; 14	NEW; R31; 14									16th	1873
2019	Cam Waters	6	Ford	ADE; R1; 22	ADE; R2; 2	MEL; R3; 3	MEL; R4; 3	MEL; R5; DNS	MEL; R6; 4	SYM; R7; 11	SYM; R8; 11	PHI; R9; Ret	PHI; R10; 6	BAR; R11; 8	BAR; R12; 3	WIN; R13; 11	WIN; R14; 6	HID; R15; 4	HID; R16; 4	TOW; R17; 21	TOW; R18; 3	QLD; R19; 6	QLD; R20; 6	BEN; R21; 9	BEN; R22; 8	PUK; R23; 2	PUK; R24; 14	BAT; R25; 20	SUR; R26; 4	SUR; R27; 5	SAN; QR; 14	SAN; R28; 21	NEW; R29; 5	NEW; R30; 8										7th	2588
2020	Cam Waters	6	Ford	ADE; R1; 6	ADE; R2; 3	MEL; R3; C	MEL; R4; C	MEL; R5; C	MEL; R6; C	SMP; R7; 6	SMP; R8; 6	SMP; R9; 13	SMP2; R10; 6	SMP2; R11; 9	SMP2; R12; 18	HID1; R13; 8	HID1; R14; 9	HID1; R15; 11	HID2; R16; 3	HID2; R17; 5	HID2; R18; Ret	TOW1; R19; 2	TOW1; R20; 4	TOW1; R21; 2	TOW2; R22; 2	TOW2; R23; 5	TOW2; R24; 12	BEN1; R25; 5	BEN1; R26; 8	BEN1; R27; 5	BEN2; R28; 3	BEN2; R29; 3	BEN2; R30; 1	BAT; R31; 2										2nd	2125
2021	Cam Waters	6	Ford	BAT; R1; 20	BAT; R2; 2	SAN; R3; 2	SAN; R4; 2	SAN; R5; 6	SYM; R6; 6	SYM; R7; 4	SYM; R8; 4	BEN; R9; 4	BEN; R10; Ret	BEN; R11; 1	HID; R12; 2	HID; R13; 7	HID; R14; 8	TOW; R15; 8	TOW; R16; 6	TOW2; R17; 1	TOW2; R18; 11	TOW2; R19; 1	SYD1; R20; 13	SYD1; R21; 13	SYD1; R22; 6	SYD2; R23; 8	SYD2; R24; 13	SYD2; R25; 8	SYD3; R26; 22	SYD3; R27; 15	SYD3; R28; 7	SYD4; R29; 3	SYD4; R30; C	BAT; R31; 2										5th	2369
2022	Cam Waters	6	Ford	SMP; R1; 11	SMP; R2; 4	SYM; R3; 3	SYM; R4; 17	SYM; R5; 6	MEL; R6; 18	MEL; R7; 21	MEL; R8; 8	MEL; R9; 7	BAR; R10; 3	BAR; R11; 4	BAR; R12; 7	WIN; R13; 1	WIN; R14; 2	WIN; R15; 1	HID; R16; 7	HID; R17; 1	HID; R18; 3	TOW; R19; 3	TOW; R20; 3	BEN; R21; 4	BEN; R22; 4	BEN; R23; 2	SAN; R24; 5	SAN; R25; 7	SAN; R26; 10	PUK; R27; 3	PUK; R28; 3	PUK; R29; 2	BAT; R30; 3	SUR; R31; 5	SUR; R32; 7	ADE; R33; 13	ADE; R34; 4							2nd	2908
2023	Cam Waters	6	Ford	NEW; R1; 1	NEW; R2; 12	MEL; R3; 7	MEL; R4; 19	MEL; R5; 10	MEL; R6; 10	BAR; R7; 22	BAR; R8; 8	BAR; R9; 6	SYM; R10; 4	SYM; R11; 4	SYM; R12; 7	HID; R13; Ret	HID; R14; 12	HID; R15; 5	TOW; R16; 5	TOW; R17; 15	SMP; R18; 5	SMP; R19; 6	BEN; R20; 4	BEN; R21; 24	BEN; R22; 2	SAN; R23; 20	BAT; R24; Ret	SUR; R25; 1	SUR; R26; 3	ADE; R27; 1	ADE; R28; 4													6th	2099

=== Car No. 56 results ===
Year	Driver	No.	Make	1	2	3	4	5	6	7	8	9	10	11	12	13	14	15	16	17	18	19	20	21	22	23	24	25	26	27	28	29	30	31	32	33	34	35	36	37	38	39	40	Position	Pts
2018	Richie Stanaway	56	Ford	ADE; R1; Ret	ADE; R2; 20	MEL; R3; 24	MEL; R4; Ret	MEL; R5; 25	MEL; R6; 18	SYM; R7; 25	SYM; R8; Ret	PHI; R9; 19	PHI; R10; 20	BAR; R11; 24	BAR; R12; 19	WIN; R13; 22	WIN; R14; 9	HID; R15; 23	HID; R16; 19	TOW; R17; 23	TOW; R18; 20	QLD; R19; 12	QLD; R20; 18	SMP; R21; 21	BEN; R22; 22	BEN; R23; 22	SAN; QR; 17	SAN; R24; 20	BAT; R25; 22	SUR; R26; Ret	SUR; R27; C	PUK; R28; 23	PUK; R29; 20	NEW; R30; 17	NEW; R31; 23									25th	1214
2019	Thomas Randle	66	Ford	ADE; R1	ADE; R2	MEL; R3	MEL; R4	MEL; R5	MEL; R6	SYM; R7; PO	SYM; R8; PO	PHI; R9	PHI; R10	BAR; R11	BAR; R12	WIN; R13; PO	WIN; R14; PO	HID; R15	HID; R16	TOW; R17	TOW; R18	QLD; R19	QLD; R20	BEN; R21; 17	BEN; R22; 17	PUK; R23	PUK; R24	BAT; R25	SUR; R26	SUR; R27	SAN; QR	SAN; R28	NEW; R29	NEW; R30										26th	732
2020	James Courtney	44	Ford	ADE; R1	ADE; R2	MEL; R3	MEL; R4	MEL; R5	MEL; R6	SMP1; R7; 12	SMP1; R8; 9	SMP1; R9; 14	SMP2; R10; 19	SMP2; R11; 4	SMP2; R12; 16	HID1; R13; 2	HID1; R14; 12	HID1; R15; 17	HID2; R16; 4	HID2; R17; 7	HID2; R18; 14	TOW1; R19; 6	TOW1; R20; 7	TOW1; R21; 13	TOW2; R22; 10	TOW2; R23; 13	TOW2; R24; 9	BEN1; R25; 15	BEN1; R26; 14	BEN1; R27; Ret	BEN2; R28; 7	BEN2; R29; 4	BEN2; R30; 10	BAT; R31; 10										13th	1476
2021	James Courtney	44	Ford	BAT; R1; 8	BAT; R2; Ret	SAN; R3; 9	SAN; R4; 7	SAN; R5; 15	SYM; R6; 11	SYM; R7; 22	SYM; R8; 9	BEN; R9; 12	BEN; R10; 4	BEN; R11; 8	HID; R12; 10	HID; R13; 10	HID; R14; 5	TOW; R15; 7	TOW; R16; 11	TOW2; R17; 8	TOW2; R18; 16	TOW2; R19; 7	SYD1; R20; 22	SYD1; R21; 18	SYD1; R22; 12	SYD2; R23; 15	SYD2; R24; 3	SYD2; R25; Ret	SYD3; R26; 21	SYD3; R27; 19	SYD3; R28; 13	SYD4; R29; 20	SYD4; R30; C	BAT; R31; 7										11th	1647
2022	Jake Kostecki	56	Ford	SMP; R1; 19	SMP; R2; 24	SYM; R3; 14	SYM; R4; Ret	SYM; R5; 25	MEL; R6; 15	MEL; R7; 13	MEL; R8; 20	MEL; R9; 13	BAR; R10; 20	BAR; R11; 9	BAR; R12; 23	WIN; R13; 24	WIN; R14; 20	WIN; R15; 25	HID; R16; 11	HID; R17; 11	HID; R18; 8	TOW; R19; 14	TOW; R20; 24	BEN; R21; 27	BEN; R22; 18	BEN; R23; Ret	SAN; R24; 22	SAN; R25; 20	SAN; R26; 20	PUK; R27; 21	PUK; R28; 9	PUK; R29; 15	BAT; R30; 17	SUR; R31; 23	SUR; R32; 15	ADE; R33; 16	ADE; R34; Ret							22nd	1192
2023	Declan Fraser	56	Ford	NEW; R1; 15	NEW; R2; Ret	MEL; R3; 24	MEL; R4; 10	MEL; R5; 13	MEL; R6; 21	BAR; R7; 19	BAR; R8; 21	BAR; R9; 23	SYM; R10; 21	SYM; R11; Ret	SYM; R12; 20	HID; R13; Ret	HID; R14; 25	HID; R15; 19	TOW; R16; 14	TOW; R17; 19	SMP; R18; 21	SMP; R19; 25	BEN; R20; 19	BEN; R21; 14	BEN; R22; 17	SAN; R23; 13	BAT; R24; 18	SUR; R25; 20	SUR; R26; 20	ADE; R27; 15	ADE; R28; Ret													24th	1056

=== Car No. 55 results ===
Year	Driver	No.	Make	1	2	3	4	5	6	7	8	9	10	11	12	13	14	15	16	17	18	19	20	21	22	23	24	25	26	27	28	29	30	31	32	33	34	35	36	37	38	39	40	Position	Pts
2018	Chaz Mostert	55	Ford	ADE; R1; 7	ADE; R2; 4	MEL; R3; 5	MEL; R4; 6	MEL; R5; 10	MEL; R6; 4	SYM; R7; Ret	SYM; R8; 10	PHI; R9; 5	PHI; R10; 5	BAR; R11; 10	BAR; R12; 11	WIN; R13; 14	WIN; R14; 10	HID; R15; 17	HID; R16; 12	TOW; R17; 13	TOW; R18; 5	QLD; R19; 6	QLD; R20; 3	SMP; R21; 5	BEN; R22; 9	BEN; R23; 12	SAN; QR; 7	SAN; R24; 10	BAT; R25; 4	SUR; R26; 1	SUR; R27; C	PUK; R28; 3	PUK; R29; 6	NEW; R30; 21	NEW; R31; 7									6th	2807
2019	Chaz Mostert	55	Ford	ADE; R1; 5	ADE; R2; 15	MEL; R3; 5	MEL; R4; 2	MEL; R5; 1	MEL; R6; 2	SYM; R7; 10	SYM; R8; 10	PHI; R9; 5	PHI; R10; 5	BAR; R11; 3	BAR; R12; Ret	WIN; R13; 2	WIN; R14; 10	HID; R15; 2	HID; R16; 6	TOW; R17; 3	TOW; R18; 5	QLD; R19; 3	QLD; R20; 3	BEN; R21; 2	BEN; R22; 3	PUK; R23; 24	PUK; R24; 3	BAT; R25; 15	SUR; R26; DNS	SUR; R27; DNS	SAN; QR; 9	SAN; R28; 2	NEW; R29; 11	NEW; R30; 6										5th	2879
2020	Jack Le Brocq	55	Ford	ADE; R1; 16	ADE; R2; 12	MEL; R3; C	MEL; R4; C	MEL; R5; C	MEL; R6; C	SMP1; R7; 19	SMP1; R8; 14	SMP1; R9; 11	SMP2; R10; 16	SMP2; R11; 16	SMP2; R12; 1	HID1; R13; 14	HID1; R14; 15	HID1; R15; 8	HID2; R16; Ret	HID2; R17; 14	HID2; R18; 13	TOW1; R19; 15	TOW1; R20; 12	TOW1; R21; 16	TOW2; R22; 8	TOW2; R23; 7	TOW2; R24; 14	BEN1; R25; 2	BEN1; R26; 10	BEN1; R27; 21	BEN2; R28; 4	BEN2; R29; 13	BEN2; R30; 19	BAT; R31; 14										15th	1396
2021	Thomas Randle	55	Ford	BAT; R1	BAT; R2	SAN; R3	SAN; R4	SAN; R5	SYM; R6	SYM; R7	SYM; R8	BEN; R9; 17	BEN; R10; 8	BEN; R11; 15	HID; R12; 9	HID; R13; 25	HID; R14; 11	TOW; R15	TOW; R16	TOW2; R17	TOW2; R18	TOW2; R19	SYD1; R20	SYD1; R21	SYD1; R22	SYD2; R23; 22	SYD2; R24; 15	SYD2; R25; 16	SYD3; R26	SYD3; R27	SYD3; R28	SYD4; R29	SYD4; R30	BAT; R31										25th	286
2022	Thomas Randle	55	Ford	SMP; R1; 20	SMP; R2; 14	SYM; R3; 22	SYM; R4; Ret	SYM; R5; 12	MEL; R6; 21	MEL; R7; 18	MEL; R8; 11	MEL; R9; 23	BAR; R10; 12	BAR; R11; 20	BAR; R12; 22	WIN; R13; 12	WIN; R14; 18	WIN; R15; 12	HID; R16; 19	HID; R17; Ret	HID; R18; 15	TOW; R19; 16	TOW; R20; 17	BEN; R21; 11	BEN; R22; Ret	BEN; R23; DNS	SAN; R24; 9	SAN; R25; 17	SAN; R26; 8	PUK; R27; 16	PUK; R28; 21	PUK; R29; 18	BAT; R30; Ret	SUR; R31; 11	SUR; R32; Ret	ADE; R33; 15	ADE; R34; 18							23rd	1156
2023	Thomas Randle	55	Ford	NEW; R1; 17	NEW; R2; 18	MEL; R3; 12	MEL; R4; 8	MEL; R5; 9	MEL; R6; 11	BAR; R7; 9	BAR; R8; 23	BAR; R9; Ret	SYM; R10; 10	SYM; R11; 22	SYM; R12; 14	HID; R13; 17	HID; R14; 10	HID; R15; 14	TOW; R16; 13	TOW; R17; 8	SMP; R18; 23	SMP; R19; 22	BEN; R20; 3	BEN; R21; 2	BEN; R22; 3	SAN; R23; 25	BAT; R24; 12	SUR; R25; 4	SUR; R26; 7	ADE; R27; 3	ADE; R28; 10													13th	1700

=== Bathurst 1000 results ===
Year	No.	Car	Drivers	Pos	Laps
2003	5	Ford Falcon BA	(Australia) Darren Hossack (Australia) Adam Macrow	DNF	63
2003	6	Ford Falcon BA	(Australia) Craig Lowndes (Australia) Glenn Seton	2nd	161
2004	5	Ford Falcon BA	(Switzerland) Alain Menu (Australia) Adam Macrow	DNF	43
2004	6	Ford Falcon BA	(Australia) Craig Lowndes (Australia) Glenn Seton	2nd	161
2005	5	Ford Falcon BA	(Australia) Greg Ritter (Australia) Cameron McLean	18th	138
2005	6	Ford Falcon BA	(Australia) Jason Bright (Australia) David Brabham	14th	152
2006	5	Ford Falcon BA	(Australia) David Brabham (New Zealand) Matthew Halliday	DNF	56
2006	6	Ford Falcon BA	(Australia) Jason Bright (Australia) Mark Winterbottom	DNF	28
2007	5	Ford Falcon BF	(Australia) Owen Kelly (New Zealand) Matthew Halliday	13th	161
2007	6	Ford Falcon BF	(Australia) Mark Winterbottom (New Zealand) Steven Richards	10th	161
2008	5	Ford Falcon BF	(Australia) Luke Youlden (Australia) Dean Canto	7th	161
2008	6	Ford Falcon BF	(Australia) Mark Winterbottom (New Zealand) Steven Richards	4th	161
2009	5	Ford Falcon FG	(Australia) Dean Canto (Australia) Luke Youlden	DNF	139
2009	6	Ford Falcon FG	(Australia) Mark Winterbottom (New Zealand) Steven Richards	DNF	49
2010	5	Ford Falcon FG	(Australia) Mark Winterbottom (Australia) Luke Youlden	9th	161
2010	6	Ford Falcon FG	(New Zealand) Steven Richards (Australia) James Moffat	11th	161
2011	5	Ford Falcon FG	(Australia) Mark Winterbottom (New Zealand) Steven Richards	4th	161
2011	6	Ford Falcon FG	(Australia) Will Davison (Australia) Luke Youlden	18th	161
2012	5	Ford Falcon FG	(Australia) Mark Winterbottom (New Zealand) Steven Richards	11th	161
2012	6	Ford Falcon FG	(Australia) Will Davison (New Zealand) John McIntyre	24th	143
2013	5	Ford Falcon FG	(Australia) Mark Winterbottom (New Zealand) Steven Richards	1st	161
2013	6	Ford Falcon FG	(Australia) Will Davison (Australia) Steve Owen	7th	161
2014	5	Ford Falcon FG	(Australia) Mark Winterbottom (Australia) Steve Owen	6th	161
2014	6	Ford Falcon FG	(Australia) Chaz Mostert (Australia) Paul Morris	1st	161
2015	5	Ford Falcon FG X	(Australia) Mark Winterbottom (Australia) Steve Owen	2nd	161
2015	6	Ford Falcon FG X	(Australia) Chaz Mostert (Australia) Cam Waters	DNS	0
2015	200	Ford Falcon FG X	(Switzerland) Simona de Silvestro (Australia) Renee Gracie	21st	121
2016	1	Ford Falcon FG X	(Australia) Mark Winterbottom (Australia) Dean Canto	DNF	132
2016	6	Ford Falcon FG X	(Australia) Cam Waters (Australia) Jack Le Brocq	4th	161
2017	5	Ford Falcon FG X	(Australia) Mark Winterbottom (Australia) Dean Canto	DNF	159
2017	6	Ford Falcon FG X	(Australia) Cam Waters (New Zealand) Richie Stanaway	16th	159
2018	5	Ford Falcon FG X	(Australia) Mark Winterbottom (Australia) Dean Canto	12th	161
2018	6	Ford Falcon FG X	(Australia) Cam Waters (Australia) David Russell	23rd	148
2018	55	Ford Falcon FG X	(Australia) Chaz Mostert (Australia) James Moffat	4th	161
2018	56	Ford Falcon FG X	(New Zealand) Richie Stanaway (Australia) Steve Owen	22nd	152
2019	5	Ford Mustang GT	(Australia) Lee Holdsworth (Australia) Thomas Randle	9th	161
2019	6	Ford Mustang GT	(Australia) Cam Waters (Australia) Michael Caruso	20th	148
2019	55	Ford Mustang GT	(Australia) Chaz Mostert (Australia) James Moffat	15th	160
2020	5	Ford Mustang GT	(Australia) Lee Holdsworth (Australia) Michael Caruso	7th	161
2020	6	Ford Mustang GT	(Australia) Cam Waters (Australia) Will Davison	2nd	161
2020	44	Ford Mustang GT	(Australia) James Courtney (Australia) Broc Feeney	10th	161
2020	55	Ford Mustang GT	(Australia) Jack Le Brocq (Australia) James Moffat	14th	161
2021	5	Ford Mustang GT	(Australia) Jack Le Brocq (Australia) Zak Best	15th	161
2021	6	Ford Mustang GT	(Australia) Cam Waters (Australia) James Moffat	2nd	161
2021	44	Ford Mustang GT	(Australia) James Courtney (Australia) Thomas Randle	7th	161
2022	5	Ford Mustang GT	(Australia) James Courtney (Australia) Zane Goddard	DNF	4
2022	6	Ford Mustang GT	(Australia) Cam Waters (Australia) James Moffat	3rd	161
2022	55	Ford Mustang GT	(Australia) Thomas Randle (Australia) Zak Best	DNF	0
2022	56	Ford Mustang GT	(Australia) Jake Kostecki (Australia) Kurt Kostecki	17th	161
2023	5	Ford Mustang GT	(Australia) James Courtney (Australia) Zak Best	6th	161
2023	6	Ford Mustang GT	(Australia) Cam Waters (Australia) James Moffat	DNF	70
2023	55	Ford Mustang GT	(Australia) Thomas Randle (Australia) Garry Jacobson	12th	161
2023	56	Ford Mustang GT	(Australia) Declan Fraser (Australia) Tyler Everingham	18th	160
2024	6	Ford Mustang GT	(Australia) Cam Waters (Australia) James Moffat	4th	161
2024	55	Ford Mustang GT	(Australia) Thomas Randle (Australia) Tyler Everingham	11th	161
2025	5	Ford Mustang GT	(Australia) Lochie Dalton (Australia) Rylan Gray	13th	161
2025	6	Ford Mustang GT	(Australia) Cam Waters (Australia) Mark Winterbottom	12th	161
2025	55	Ford Mustang GT	(Australia) Thomas Randle (Australia) James Moffat	11th	161

=== Teams Championship results ===
Year	Car	Pos	Points
2005	Ford Falcon BA	8th	2443
2006	Ford Falcon BA	2nd	5817
2007	Ford Falcon BF	4th	788
2008	Ford Falcon BF	2nd	5308
2009	Ford Falcon FG	4th	4104
2010	Ford Falcon FG	4th	4369
2011	Ford Falcon FG	2nd	5080
2012	Ford Falcon FG	2nd	6506
2013	Ford Falcon FG	2nd	5617
2014	Ford Falcon FG	2nd	5244
2015	Ford Falcon FG X	2nd	5554
2016	Ford Falcon FG X	4th	3962
2017	Ford Falcon FG X	3rd	4416
2018	Ford Falcon FG X	3rd	4999
2019	Mustang GT	3rd	5294
2020	Mustang GT	3rd	3521
2021	Mustang GT	3rd	4016
2022	Mustang GT	3rd	4656
2023	Mustang GT	4th	3667
2024	Mustang GT	2nd	4523
2025	Mustang GT	4th	4126

Positions based on highest Tickford team between 2016 and 2023. This is because Tickford had to split into two teams on account of 4 cars.

- denotes ongoing season

== Supercars Championship drivers ==
The following is a list of drivers who have driven for the team in the Supercars Championship, in order of their first appearance. Drivers who only drove for the team on a part-time basis are listed in italics.

- (Australia) Glenn Seton (2003–04)
- (Australia) Craig Lowndes (2003–04)
- (Australia) David Besnard (2003)
- (Australia) Adam Macrow (2003–04)
- (Australia) Darren Hossack (2003)
- (Australia) Owen Kelly (2003, 2007)
- (Switzerland) Alain Menu (2004)
- (Australia) Greg Ritter (2005)
- (Australia) Jason Bright (2005–06)
- (Australia) David Brabham (2005–06)
- (Australia) Cameron McLean (2005–06)
- (Australia) Mark Winterbottom (2006–18, 2025-present)
- (New Zealand) Matt Halliday (2006–07)
- (New Zealand) Steven Richards (2007–13)
- (Australia) Luke Youlden (2008–11)
- (Australia) Dean Canto (2008–09, 2016–18)
- (Australia) James Moffat (2010, 2018–present)
- (Australia) Will Power (2010, 2012)
- (Australia) Will Davison (2011–13, 2020)
- (United Kingdom) Richard Lyons (2011)
- (Finland) Mika Salo (2011–12)
- (New Zealand) John McIntyre (2012)
- (Australia) Steve Owen (2013–15, 2018)
- (Australia) Chaz Mostert (2014–15, 2018–19)
- (Australia) Paul Morris (2014)
- (Australia) Cam Waters (2015–present)
- (Australia) Russell Ingall (2015)
- (Australia) Jack Le Brocq (2016, 2020–21)
- (New Zealand) Richie Stanaway (2017–18)
- (Australia) David Russell (2018)
- (Australia) Lee Holdsworth (2019–20)
- (Australia) Thomas Randle (2019, 2021–present)
- (Australia) Michael Caruso (2019–20)
- (Australia) James Courtney (2020–2023)
- (Australia) Broc Feeney (2020)
- (Australia) Zak Best (2021–2023)
- (Australia) Jake Kostecki (2022)
- (Australia) Kurt Kostecki (2022)
- (Australia) Zane Goddard (2022)
- (Australia) Declan Fraser (2023)
- (Australia) Tyler Everingham (2023)
- (Australia) Lachlan Dalton (2024–2025)
- (Australia) Rylan Gray (2025)
- (United States) Austin Cindric (2025)
- (Australia) Reuben Goodall (2026–present)
- (Australia) Ben Gomersall (2026–present)

== Super2 drivers ==
The following is a list of drivers who have driven for the team in the Super2 Series, in order of their first appearance. Drivers who only drove for the team on a part-time basis are listed in italics.

- (Australia) James Moffat (2010)
- (Australia) Chaz Mostert (2011–12)
- (Australia) Cam Waters (2014–15)
- (Australia) Garry Jacobson (2016–17)
- (Australia) Jack Le Brocq (2016)
- (Australia) Josh Kean (2017)
- (New Zealand) Richie Stanaway (2017)
- (Australia) Thomas Randle (2018–19)
- (Australia) Broc Feeney (2020)
- (Australia) Zak Best (2021–22)
- (Australia) Brad Vaughan (2023–24)
- (Australia) Elly Morrow (2023)
- (Australia) Lochie Dalton (2024–25)
- (Australia) Rylan Gray (2024–25)
- (Australia) Reuben Goodall (2025–Present)
- (Australia) Nash Morris (2025–Present)
- (Australia) Ben Gomersall (2026–present)
- (Australia) Campbell Logan (2026–present)

== Super2 Results ==
=== Car No. 5 results ===
Year	Driver	No.	Make	1	2	3	4	5	6	7	8	9	10	11	12	13	14	15	16	17	18	19	20	21	22	23	24	25	26	27	28	29	30	Position	Pts
2010	James Moffat	99	Ford BF Falcon	ADE; R1; 2	ADE; R2; 2	QLD; R3; 15	QLD; R4; 9	QLD; R5; Ret	WIN; R6; 3	WIN; R7; 5	WIN; R8; Ret	TOW; R9; 2	TOW; R10; Ret	TOW; R11; 7	BAT; R12; 4	BAT; R13; 2	SAN; R14; 3	SAN; R15; 3	SAN; R16; 2	HOM; R17; 3	HOM; R18; 3													3rd	1473
2011	Chaz Mostert	56	Ford FG Falcon	ADE; R1	ADE; R2	BAR; R3	BAR; R4	TOW; R5	TOW; R6	TOW; R7	QLD; R8	QLD; R9	QLD; R10	BAT; R11	BAT; R12	SAN; R13; 2	SAN; R14; 15	SAN; R15; 2	HOM; R16; 3	HOM; R17; 5														6th	1253
2012	Chaz Mostert	56	Ford FG Falcon	ADE; R1; 1	ADE; R2; 1	BAR; R3; 4	BAR; R4; 5	BAR; R5; 3	TOW; R6; 3	TOW; R7; 19	TOW; R8; 3	QLD; R9; 1	QLD; R10; 5	QLD; R11; 1	BAT; R12; 2	BAT; R13; 2	WIN; R14; 5	WIN; R15; 19	WIN; R16; 5	HOM; R17; 6	HOM; R18; 2													3rd	1665
2014	Cameron Waters	56	Ford FG Falcon	ADE; R1; 2	ADE; R2; 22	WIN; R3; 1	WIN; R4; 4	BAR; R5; 7	BAR; R6; Ret	TOW; R7; 21	TOW; R8; 2	QLD; R9; 19	QLD; R10; 3	BAT; R11; 2	HOM; R12; 2	HOM; R13; 1																		2nd	1439
2015	Cameron Waters	5	Ford FG Falcon	ADE; 1	ADE; 2	BAR; 1	BAR; 1	BAR; 1	WIN; 1	WIN; 1	WIN; 1	TOW; 1	TOW; 2	QLD; 1	QLD; 1	QLD; 3	BAT; 2	HOM; 8	HOM; 2															1st	1966
2016	Jack Le Brocq	5	Ford FG X Falcon	ADE; 4	ADE; 3	PHI; 10	PHI; 4	PHI; 13	BAR; 1	BAR; 1	BAR; 1	TOW	TOW	SAN; 9	SAN; Ret	SAN; 2	BAT; 7	HOM; 1	HOM; 1															2nd	1650
2017	Josh Kean	5	Ford FG X Falcon	ADE; 20	ADE; 18	ADE; Ret	SYM; 8	SYM; Ret	SYM; 12	SYM; 19	PHI; 10	PHI; 21	PHI; 15	PHI; 10	TOW; Ret	TOW; Ret	SMP; 14	SMP; 19	SMP; Ret	SMP; 9	SAN; 15	SAN; 6	NEW; 14	NEW; Ret										19th	623
2018	Thomas Randle	5	Ford FG X Falcon	ADE; R1; Ret	ADE; R2; DNS	ADE; R3; DNS	SYM; R4; 10	SYM; R5; 12	SYM; R6; 8	BAR; R7; 6	BAR; R8; 2	BAR; R9; 6	TOW; R10; 4	TOW; R11; 20	SAN; R12; 3	SAN; R13; 8	BAT; R14; 8	NEW; R15; Ret	NEW; R16; C															11th	915
2019	Thomas Randle	5	Ford FG X Falcon	ADE; R1; Ret	ADE; R2; 9	ADE; R3; 4	BAR; R4; 5	BAR; R5; 7	TOW; R6; 13	TOW; R7; 15	QLD; R8; 1	QLD; R9; 2	BAT; R10; 1	SAN; R11; 11	SAN; R12; Ret	NEW; R13; 2	NEW; R14; 3																	3rd	1396
2020	Broc Feeney	5	Ford FG X Falcon	ADE; R1; 10	ADE; R2; 7	ADE; R3; 7	SYD; R4; 4	SYD; R5; 8	BAT; R6; 4	BAT; R7; DNS																								7th	510
2021	Zak Best	78	Ford FG X Falcon	BAT; R1; 4	BAT; R2; 2	TOW1; R3; 4	TOW1; R4; 4	TOW2; R5; 3	TOW2; R6; 1	SMP; R7; 15	SMP; R8; C	BAT; R9; 4	BAT; R10; 4																					2nd	1077
2022	Zak Best	78	Ford FG X Falcon	SMP; R1; 2	SMP; R2; 1	WAN; R3; Ret	WAN; R4; 7	TOW; R5; 2	TOW; R6; 12	SAN; R7; 2	SAN; R8; 3	BAT; R9; 1	BAT; R10; C	ADE; R11; 4	ADE; R12; 3																			2nd	1257

== Gallery ==
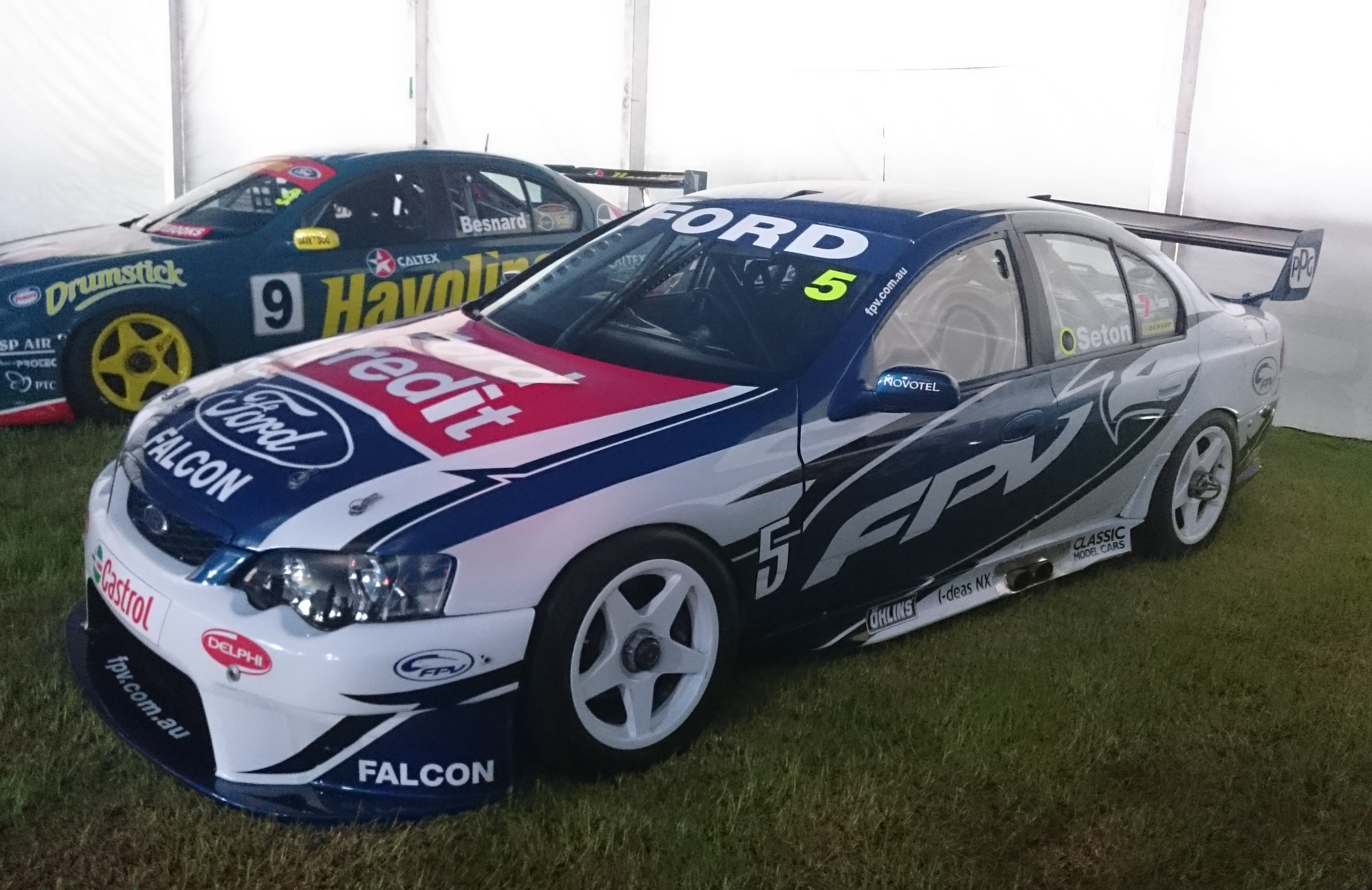
The Ford BA Falcon in which Glenn Seton contested the 2004 V8 Supercar Championship Series for Ford Performance Racing. Pictured in 2018.

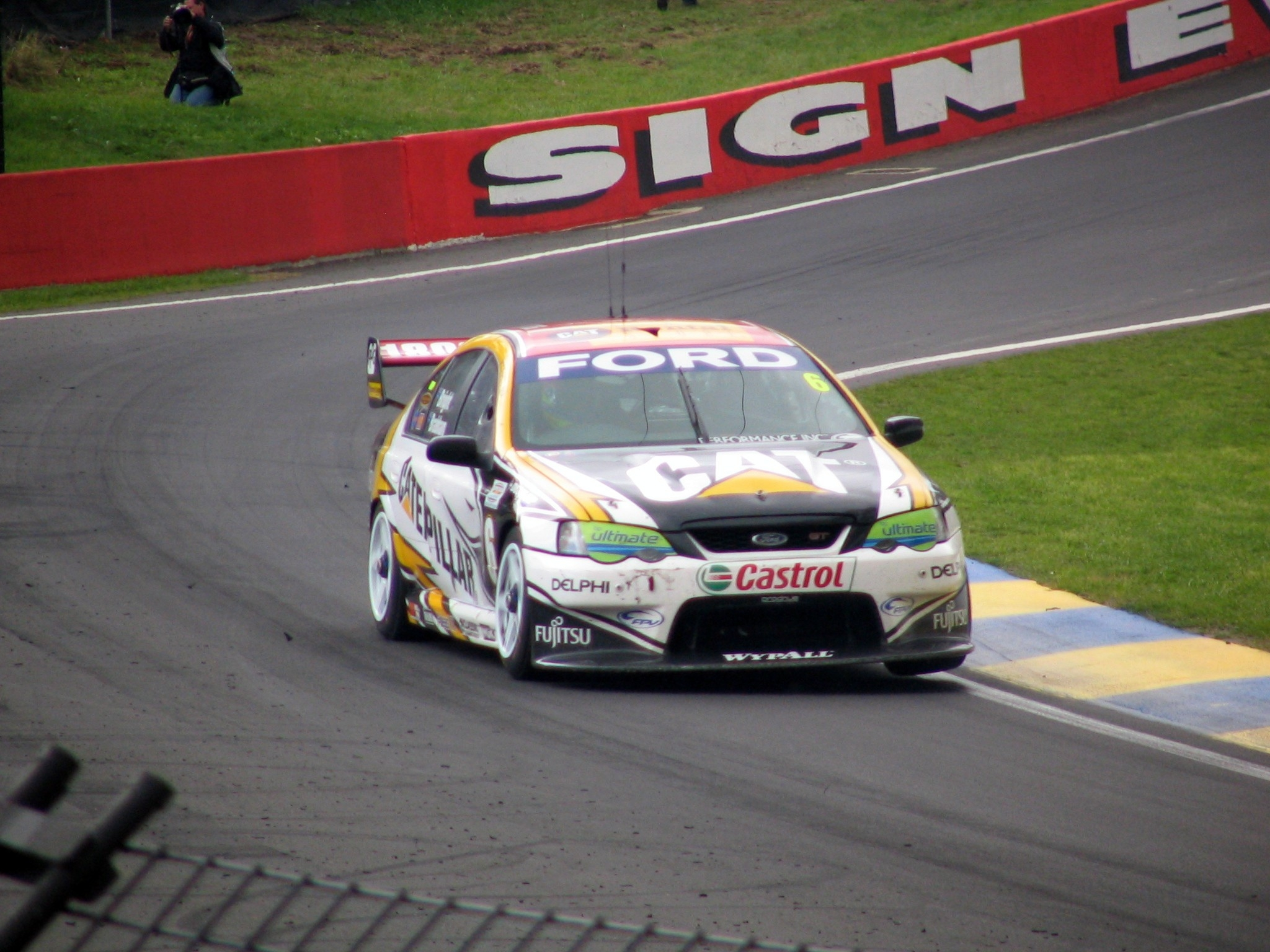
The BA Falcon of Jason Bright & David Brabham at the 2005 Bathurst 1000.

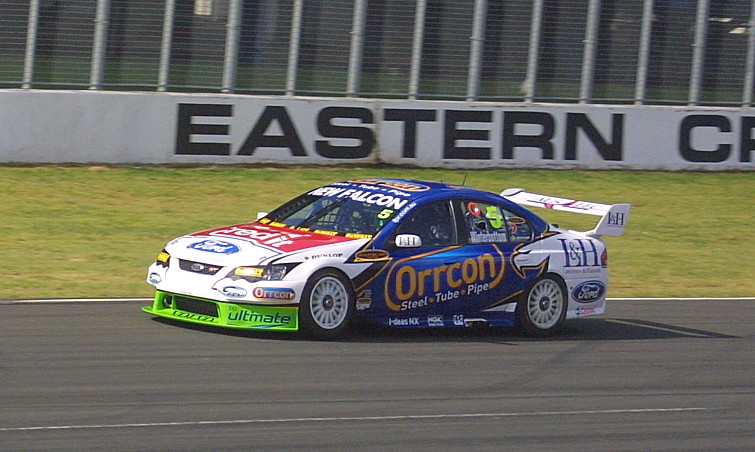
The BF Falcon of Mark Winterbottom at the Eastern Creek round in 2008.

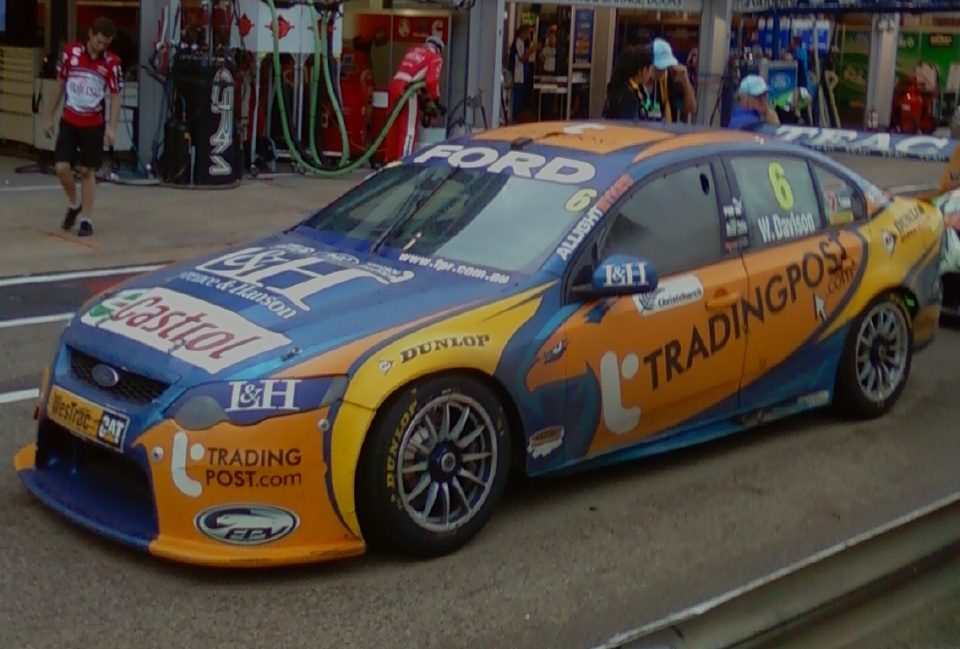
The FG Falcon of Will Davison at the 2011 Clipsal 500.

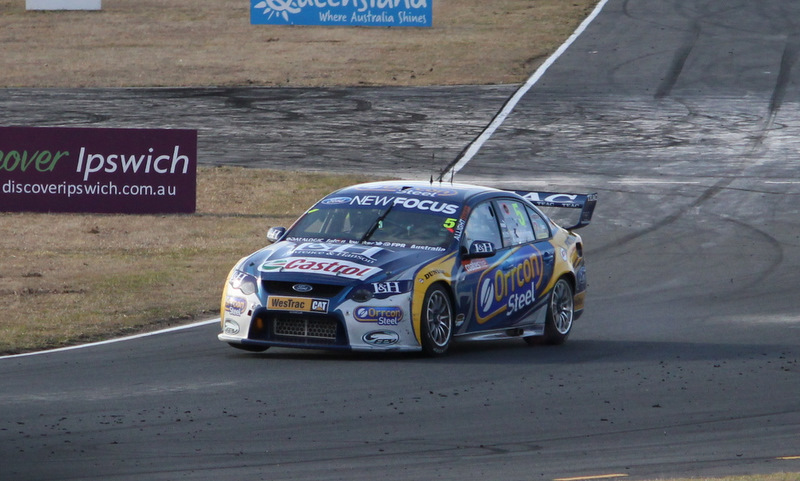
The FG Falcon of Mark Winterbottom at Queensland Raceway in August 2011.

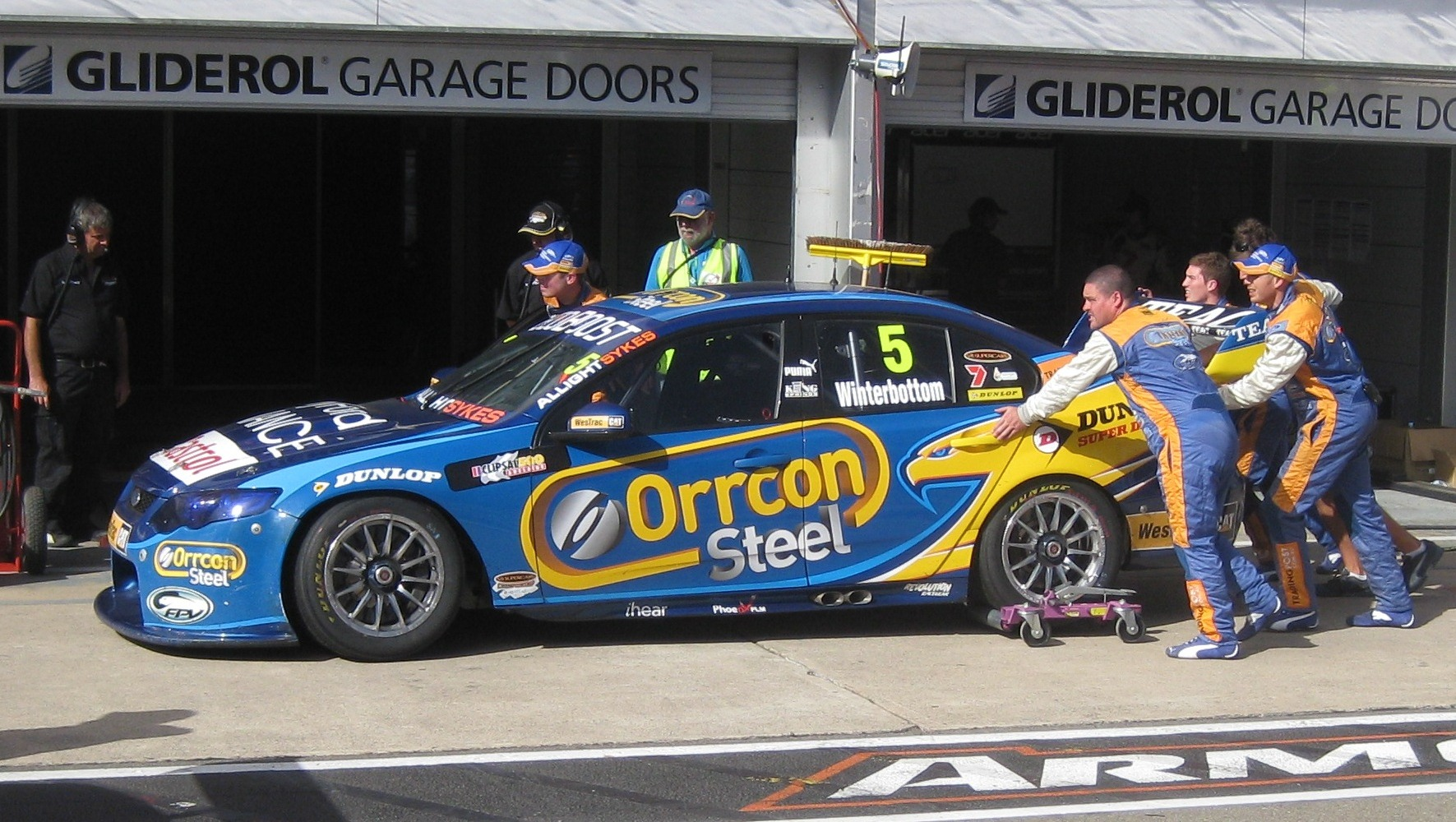
The FG Falcon of Mark Winterbottom at the 2012 Clipsal 500.

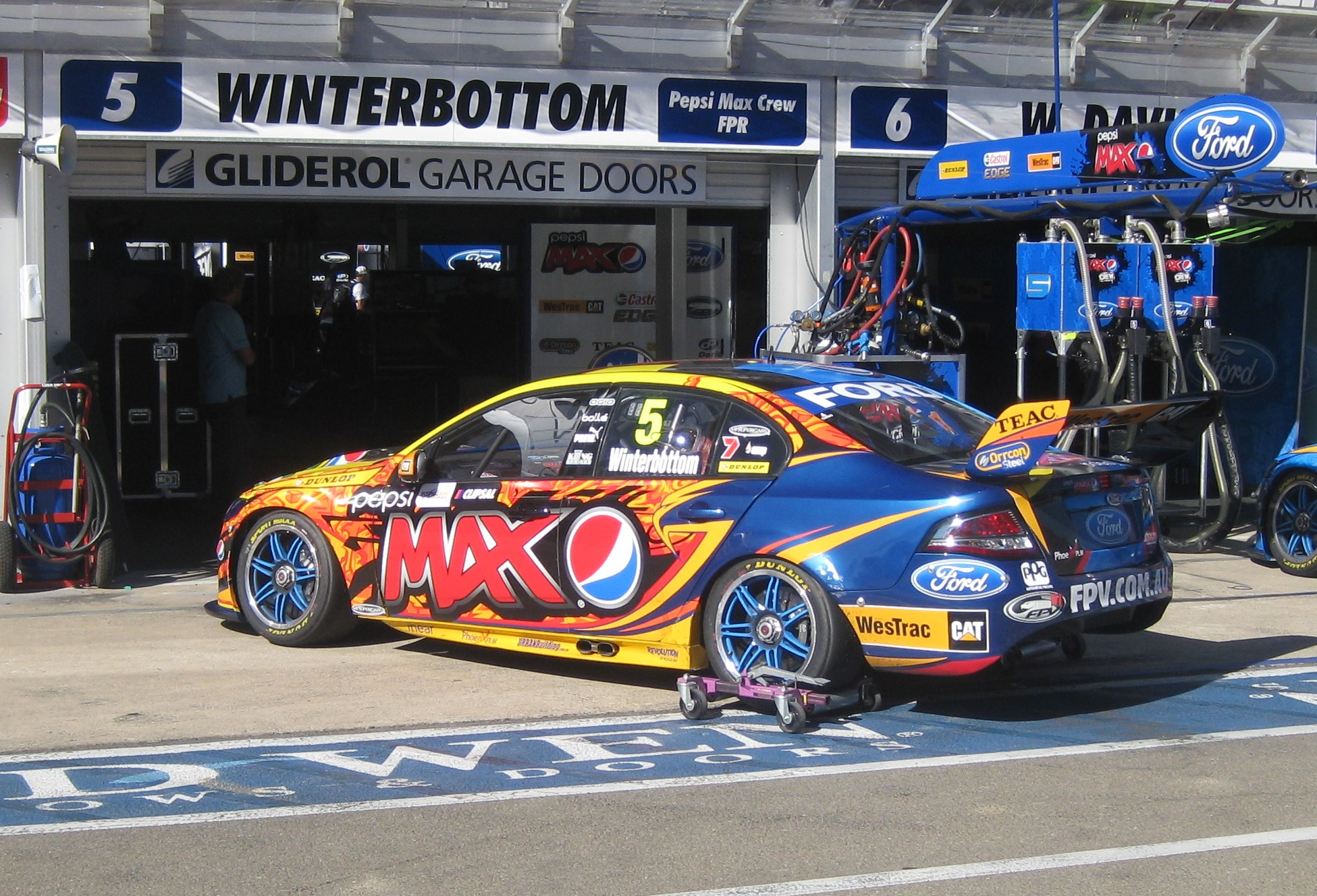
The FG Falcon of Mark Winterbottom at the 2013 Clipsal 500.

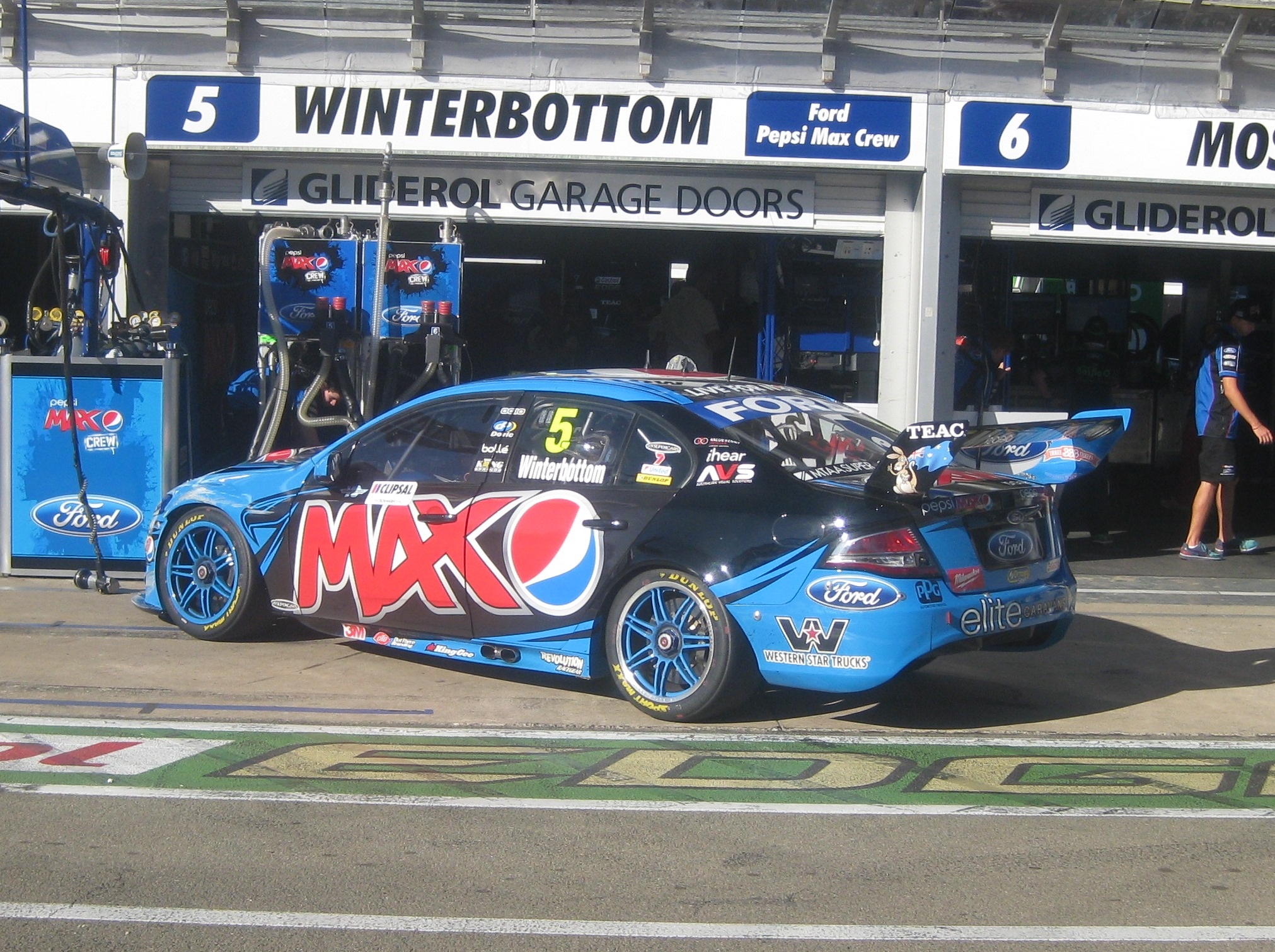
The FPR entered Ford FG Falcon of Mark Winterbottom at the 2014 Clipsal 500 Adelaide.

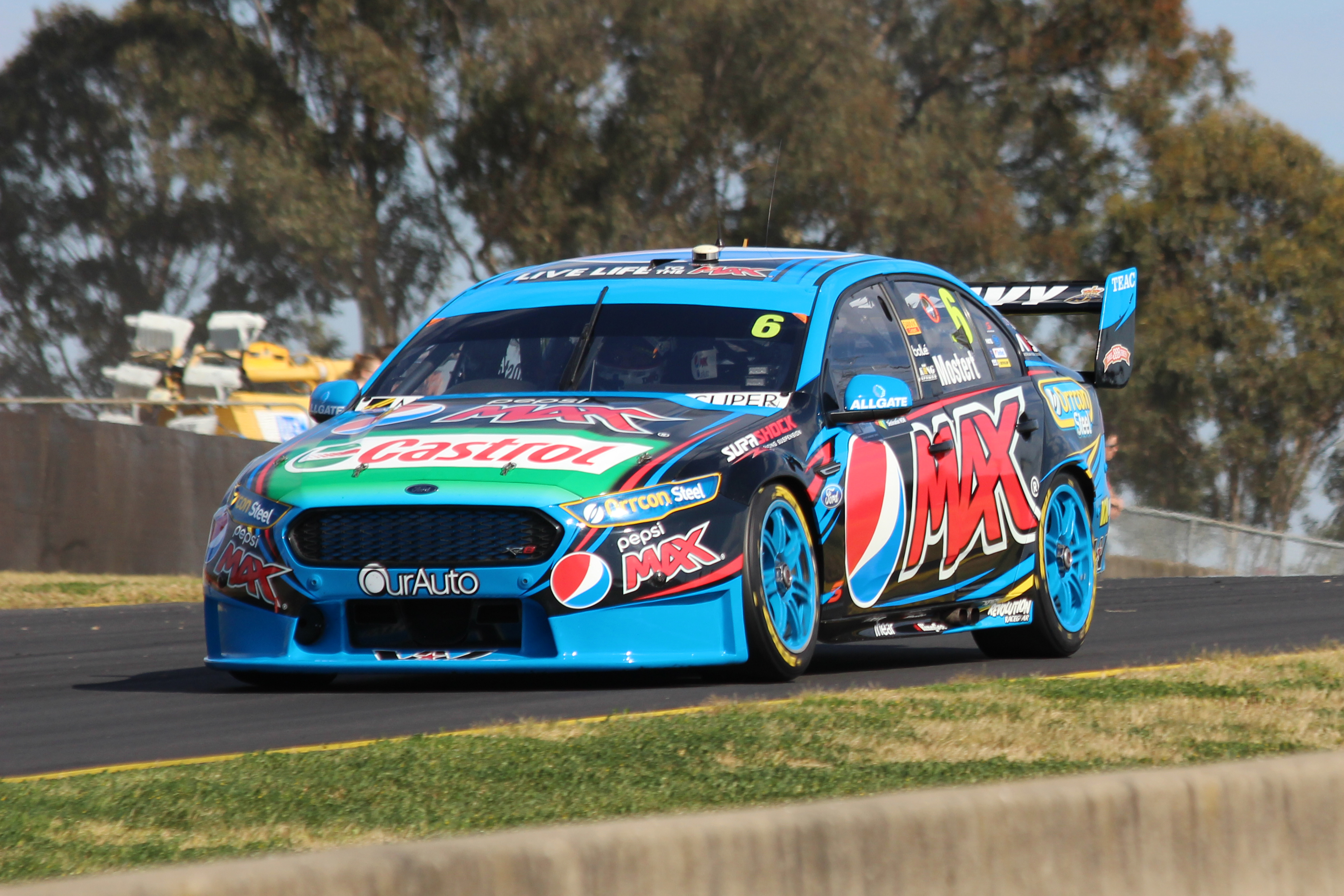
The Ford FG X Falcon of Chaz Mostert at the 2015 Sydney Motorsport Park Super Sprint.

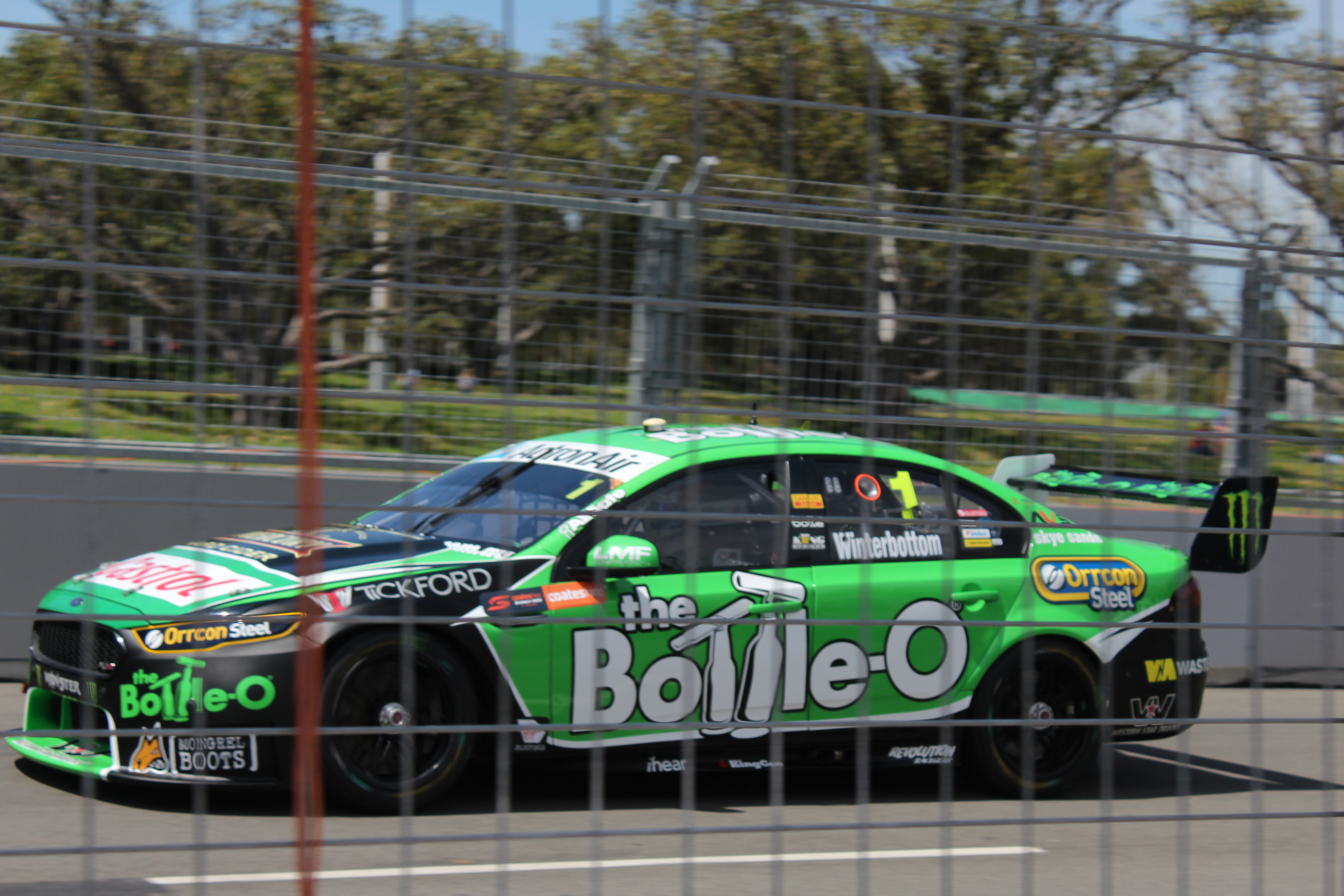
The Ford FG X Falcon of Mark Winterbottom at the 2016 Coates Hire Sydney 500

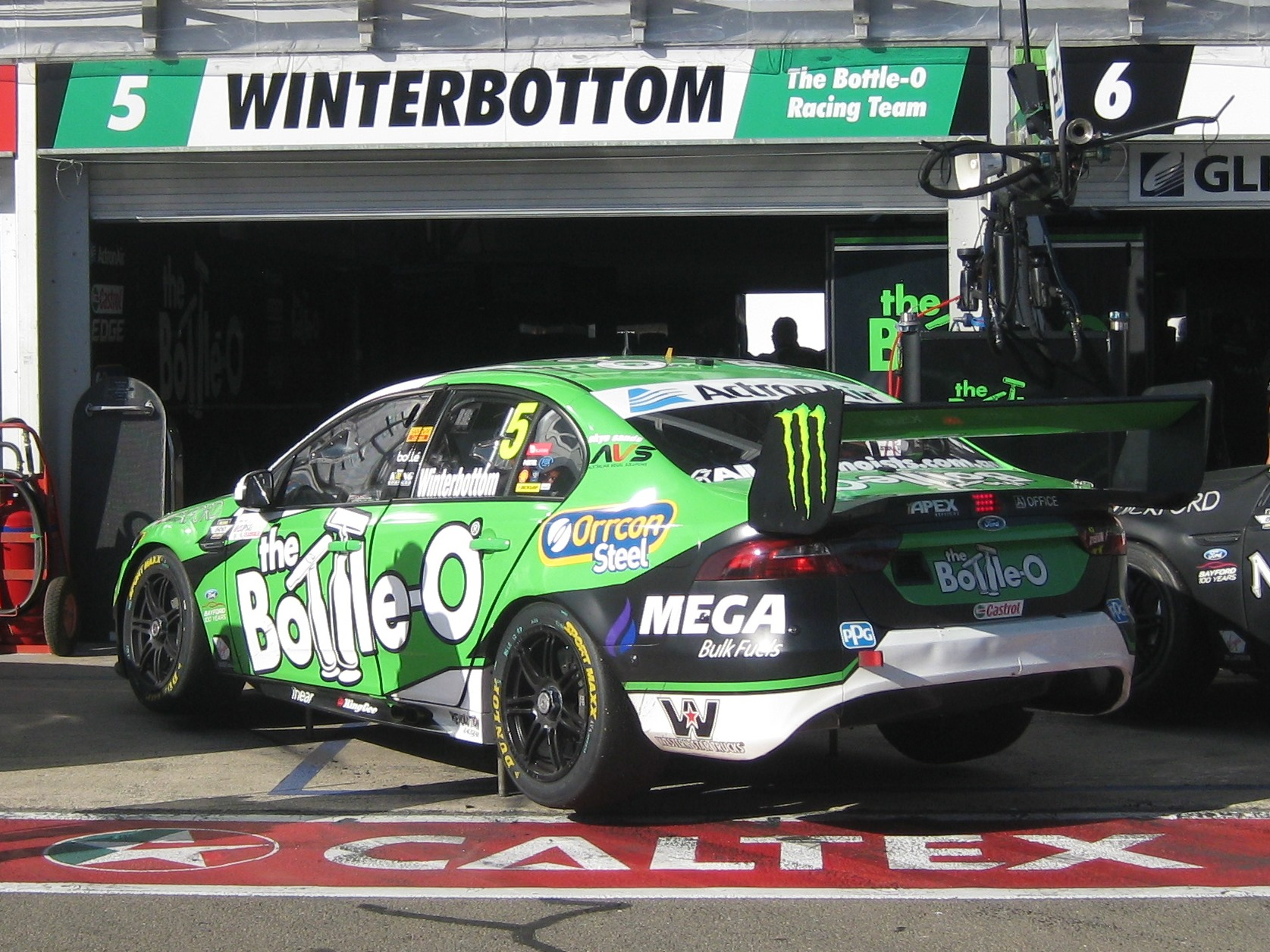
The Ford Falcon FG X of Mark Winterbottom at the 2017 Clipsal 500 Adelaide

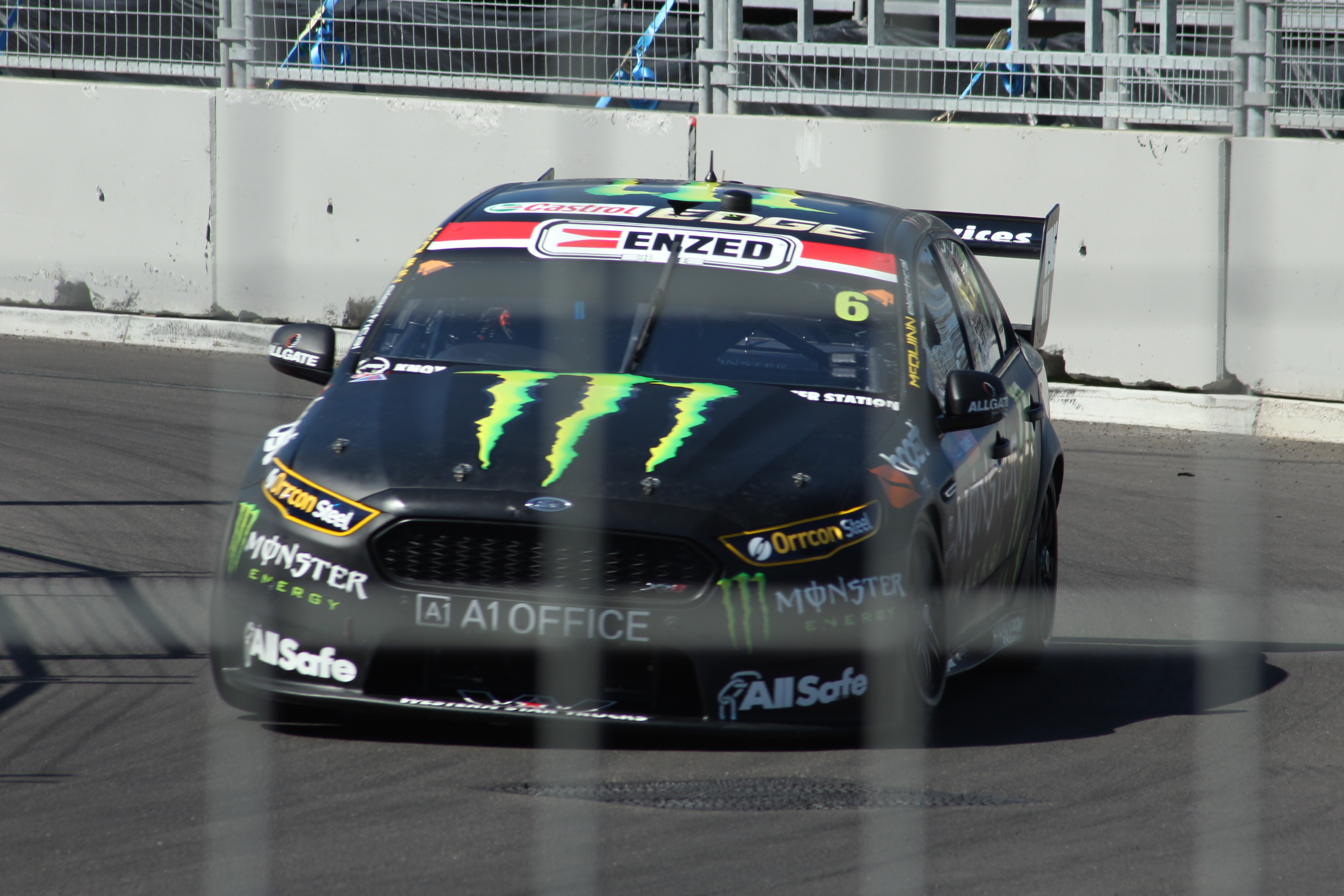
The Ford FG X Falcon of Cam Waters at the 2017 Coates Hire Newcastle 500

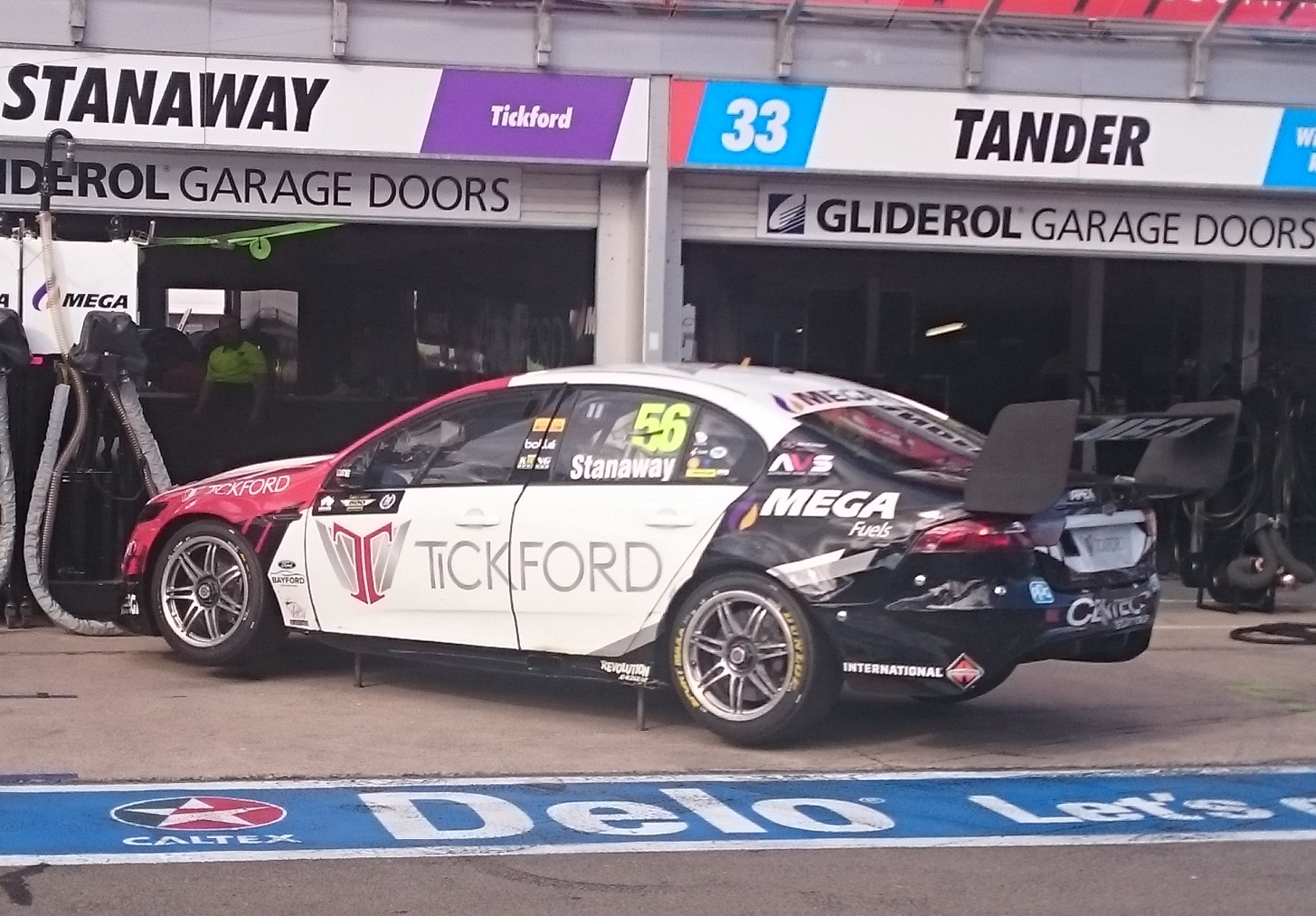
The Ford Falcon FG X of Richie Stanaway at the 2018 Adelaide 500

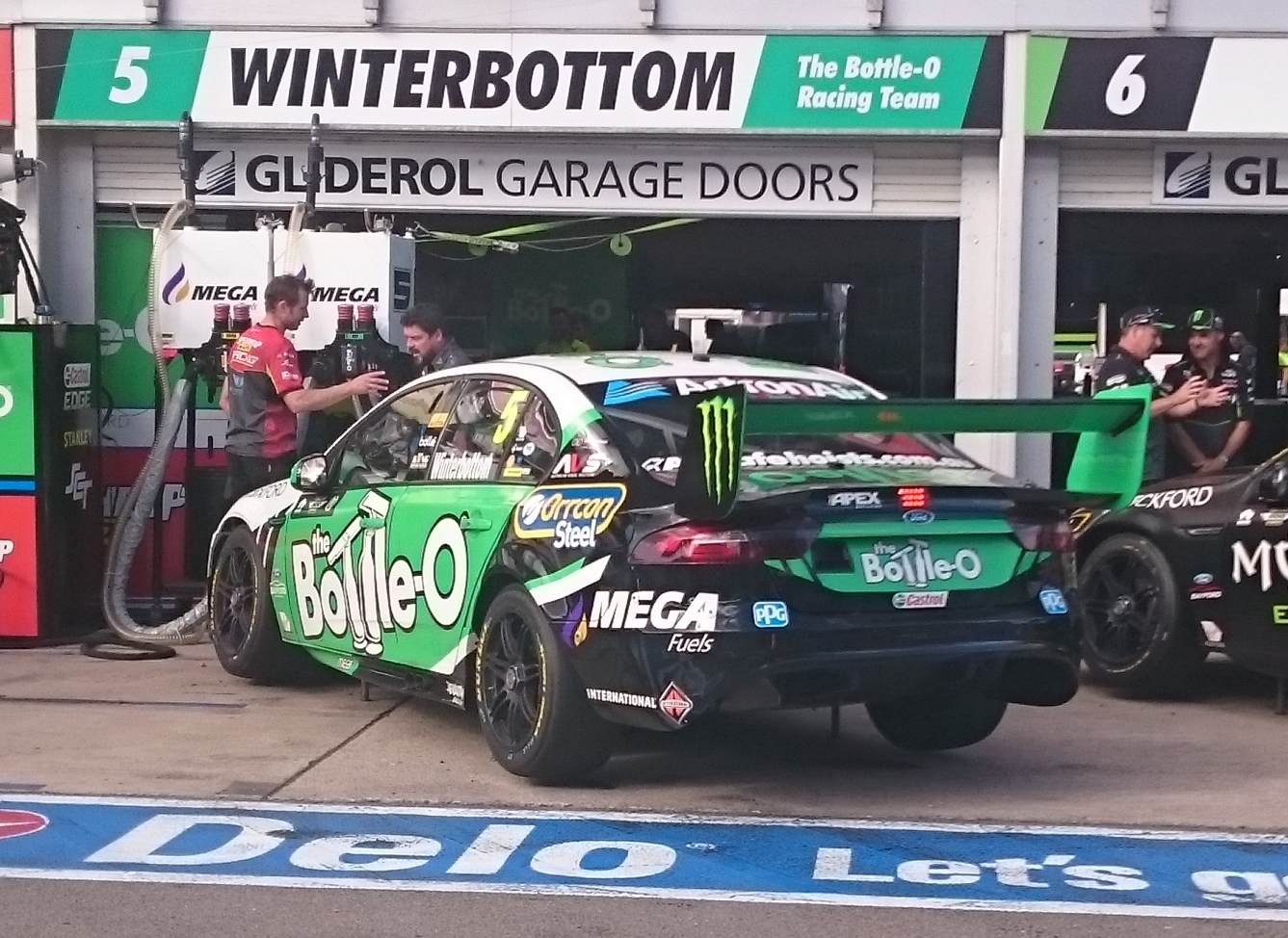
The Ford Falcon FG X of Mark Winterbottom at the 2018 Adelaide 500

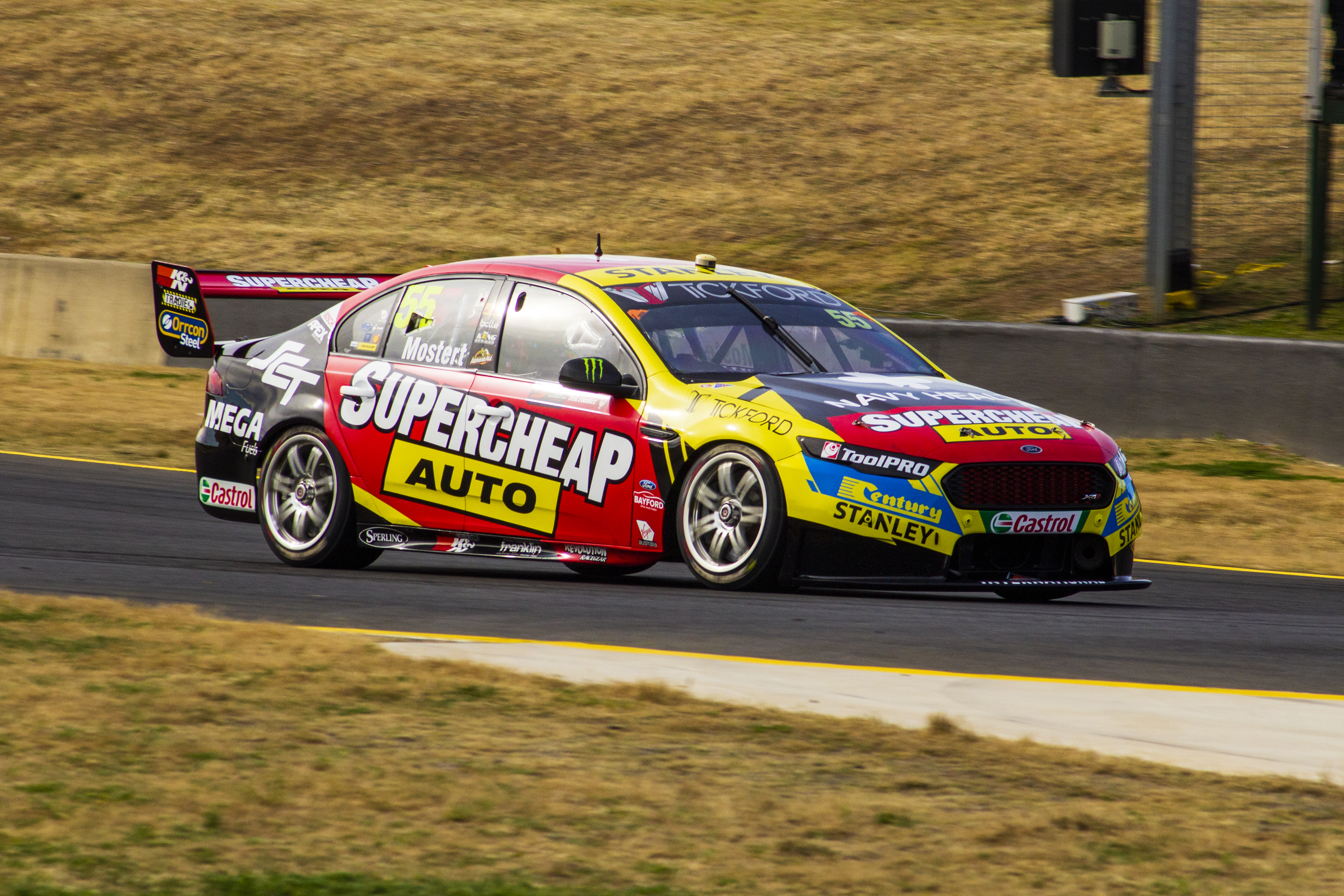
The Ford FG X Falcon of Chaz Mostert at the 2018 Red Rooster Sydney SuperNight 300

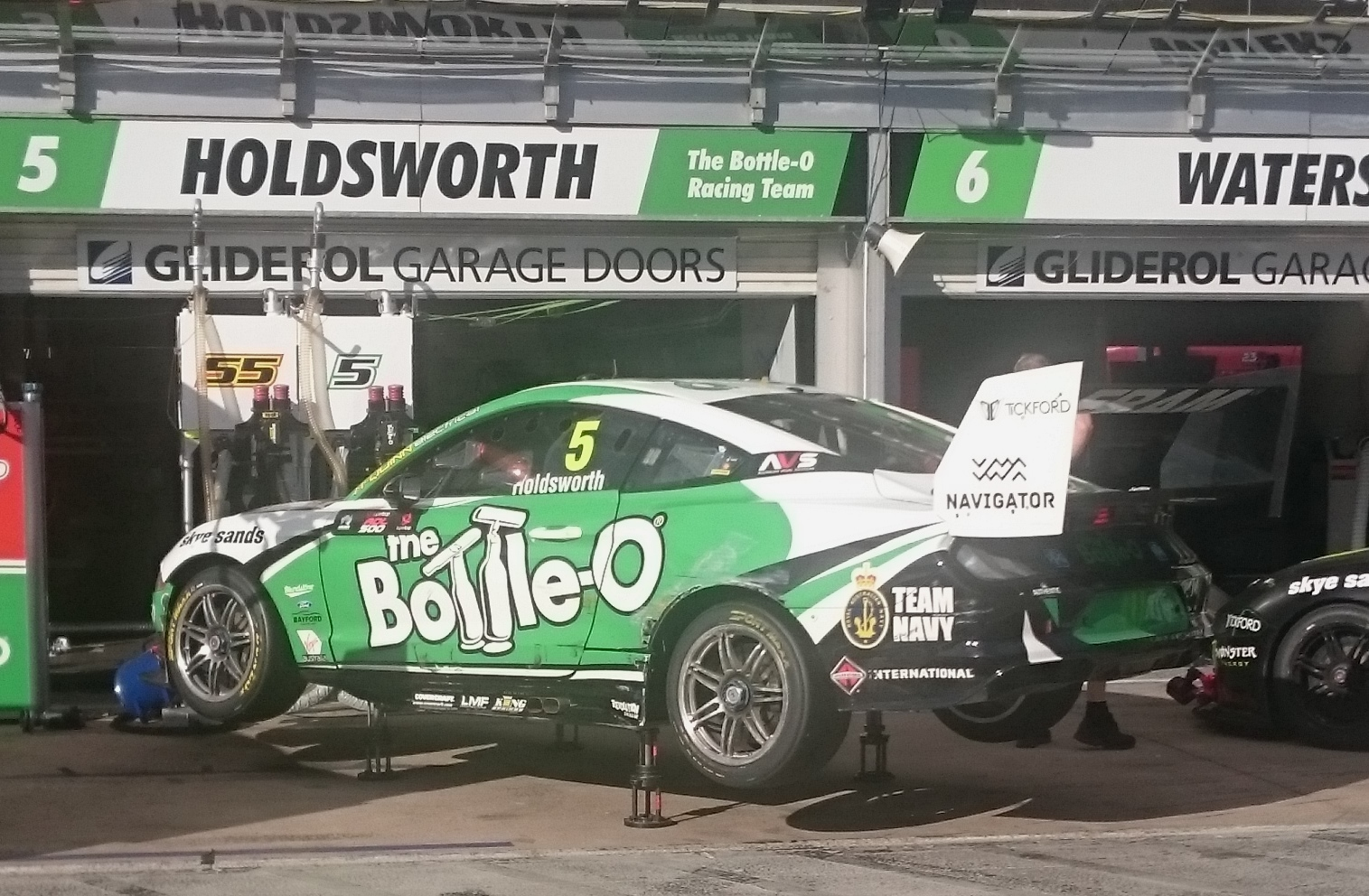
The Ford Mustang GT of Lee Holdsworth at the 2019 Adelaide 500
