= Jack Le Brocq =

Australian professional racing driver (born 1992)

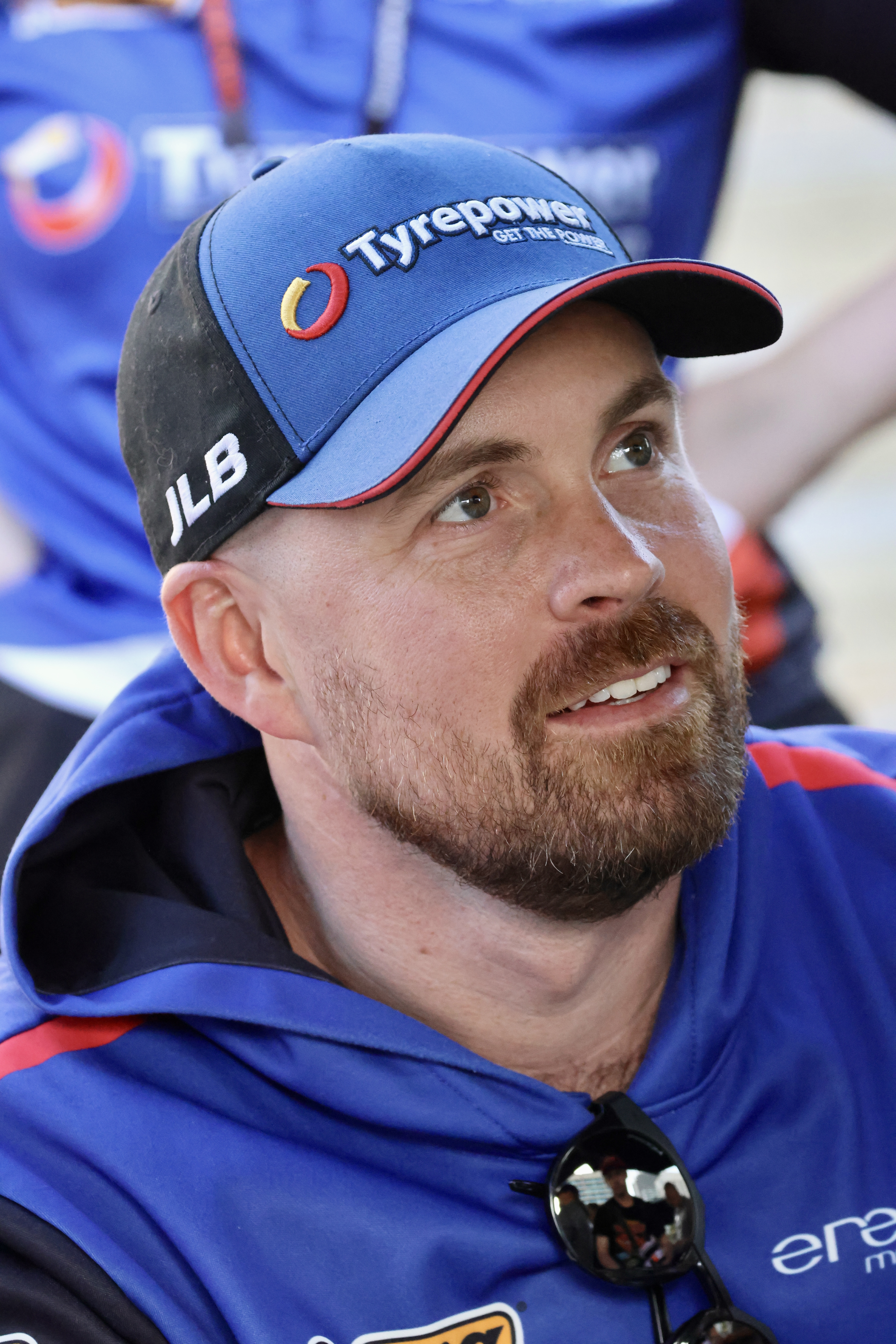
- Le Brocq in 2025
- Nationality: Australian
- Born: Jack Bellamy Le Brocq; 7 July 1992 (age 34) Melbourne, Victoria
- Categorisation: FIA Silver (until 2023); FIA Gold (2024–)

Supercars Championship career
- Current team: Matt Stone Racing
- Championships: 0
- Races: 288
- Wins: 2
- Podiums: 3
- Pole positions: 2
- 2026 position: 11th (1709 pts)

Jack Bellamy Le Brocq (born 7 July 1992) is an Australian professional racing driver. He currently competes in the Repco Supercars Championship, and drives the No. 4 Chevrolet Camaro ZL1 for Matt Stone Racing. So far, Le Brocq's career highlights include winning the Australian Formula Ford Championship and recording multiple race wins and top 3 championship places in the Dunlop Super2 Series.

== Racing career ==
Le Brocq won the 2012 Australian Formula Ford Championship, which led to a contract with Erebus Motorsport's driver academy. He would race for the team in the 2013 Australian GT Championship, winning two rounds and finishing ninth in the championship.

=== Super2 Series ===
Le Brocq made his debut in the Dunlop Series with Image Racing in a Ford FG Falcon in 2014. He joined MW Motorsport in 2015 and finished third in the championship.

In 2016, Le Brocq joined Prodrive Racing Australia in the No. 5 Ford FG X Falcon. After recording seven race wins, he finished the championship in second place, behind teammate Garry Jacobson. He then moved back to MW Motorsport in 2017 to drive the No. 28 Nissan Altima L33. Le Brocq would win three races and finish third in the championship.

=== Supercars Championship ===
Le Brocq made his debut in the Supercars Championship at the 2015 Sandown 500 alongside Ash Walsh in the No. 4 Erebus Motorsport Mercedes-Benz E63 AMG. They finished the race in 19th. The pair then had a DNF at the Bathurst 1000 after the car hit the wall at the cutting. They would again finish in 19th place for the first race at the Gold Coast 600. They were disqualified from the second race.

In 2016, Le Brocq would co-drive with Cameron Waters in No. 6 Ford FG X Falcon for Prodrive Racing Australia. They retired from the 2016 Sandown 500 because of engine issues. At the Bathurst 1000 the pair stayed out of trouble to finish the race in fourth place. At the Gold Coast 600, they retired from the first race after an accident and finished the second race in 14th place.

Le Brocq made his solo Supercars debut at the 2017 Darwin Triple Crown as a wildcard entry, racing with his Super2 team MW Motorsport in the No. 28 Nissan Altima L33. He finished the first race in 19th place before finishing in 22nd for the second race. He also raced at the Ipswich SuperSprint, finishing race 1 in 19th and retiring from race 2. For the Pirtek Enduro Cup, he moved to Nissan Motorsport to drive alongside Todd Kelly in the No. 7 Nissan Altima L33. The best finish they recorded was a seventh place at the Bathurst 1000.

In 2018, Le Brocq made his debut as a full-time driver in the Supercars Championship with Tekno Autosports in the No. 19 Holden ZB Commodore.

== Career results ==
Season	Series	Position	Car	Team
2010	Australian Formula Ford Championship	13th	Spectrum 011c	CAMS Rising Stars/Minda Motorsport
2011	Australian Formula Ford Championship	**2nd**	Mygale SJ11a	CAMS Rising Stars/Minda Motorsport
2011	British Formula Ford Championship	NC	Mygale SJ11a	Jamun Racing
2012	Australian Formula Ford Championship	**1st**	Mygale SJ12A	CAMS Rising Stars/Minda Motorsport
2012	Australian V8 Ute Racing Series	52nd	Holden VE SS Ute	Ice Break Racing
2013	Australian GT Championship	9th	Mercedes-Benz SLS AMG GT3	Erebus Motorsport
2013	Australian V8 Ute Racing Series	47th	Holden VE SS Ute	Wake-Up Backpackers Racing
2013	Kumho Tyres V8 Touring Car Series	21st	Ford BF Falcon	MW Motorsport
2014	Dunlop V8 Supercar Series	13th	Ford FG Falcon	Image Racing
2015	V8 Supercars Dunlop Series	**3rd**	Ford FG Falcon	MW Motorsport
2015	International V8 Supercars Championship	51st	Mercedes-Benz E63 AMG	Erebus Motorsport
2016	Supercars Dunlop Series	**2nd**	Ford FG X Falcon	Prodrive Racing Australia
2016	International V8 Supercars Championship	46th	Ford FG X Falcon	Prodrive Racing Australia
2017	Dunlop Super2 Series	**3rd**	Nissan Altima L33	MW Motorsport
2017	Virgin Australia Supercars Championship	36th	Nissan Altima L33	Nissan Motorsport
2018	Virgin Australia Supercars Championship	19th	Holden ZB Commodore	Tekno Autosports
2019	Virgin Australia Supercars Championship	22nd	Holden ZB Commodore	Tekno Autosports
2020	Virgin Australia Supercars Championship	15th	Ford Mustang GT	Tickford Racing
2021	Repco Supercars Championship	16th	Ford Mustang GT	Tickford Racing
2022	Repco Supercars Championship	21st	Holden ZB Commodore	Matt Stone Racing
2023	Repco Supercars Championship	12th	Chevrolet Camaro ZL1	Matt Stone Racing
2024	Repco Supercars Championship	14th	Chevrolet Camaro ZL1	Erebus Motorsport
2025	Repco Supercars Championship	17th	Chevrolet Camaro ZL1	Erebus Motorsport
2026	Repco Supercars Championship		Chevrolet Camaro ZL1	Matt Stone Racing

=== Super3 Series results ===
(key) (Races in bold indicate pole position) (Races in italics indicate fastest lap)

Year	Team	Car	1	2	3	4	5	6	7	8	9	10	11	12	13	14	15	16	17	18	Position	Points
2013	MW Motorsport	Ford BF Falcon	SMP; R1	SMP; R2	SMP; R3	MAL; R4	MAL; R5	MAL; R6	WIN; R7	WIN; R8	WIN; R9	QLD; R10	QLD; R11	QLD; R12	PHI; R13	PHI; R14	PHI; R15	SAN; R16; 4	SAN; R17; 7	SAN; R18; 4	21st	85

=== Complete Super2 Series results ===
(key) (Races in bold indicate pole position) (Races in italics indicate fastest lap)

Year	Team	Car	1	2	3	4	5	6	7	8	9	10	11	12	13	14	15	16	17	18	19	20	21	Position	Points
2014	Image Racing	Ford FG Falcon	ADE; R1; Ret	ADE; R2; Ret	WIN; R3; 19	WIN; R4; 15	BAR; R5; 6	BAR; R6; 16	TOW; R7; 22	TOW; R8; 8	QLD; R9; 6	QLD; R10; 7	BAT; R11; 10	HOM; R12	HOM; R13									13th	750
2015	MW Motorsport	Ford FG Falcon	ADE; R1; 7	ADE; R2; 7	BAR; R3; 3	BAR; R4; 3	BAR; R5; 4	WIN; R6; 4	WIN; R7; 4	WIN; R8; 5	TOW; R9; 3	TOW; R10; 4	QLD; R11; 2	QLD; R12; 3	QLD; R13; 5	BAT; R14; 9	HOM; R15; 5	**HOM**; **R16**; **3**						3rd	1587
2016	Prodrive Racing Australia	Ford FG X Falcon	ADE; R1; 4	ADE; R2; 3	**PHI**; **R3**; **10**	PHI; R4; 4	PHI; R5; 13	BAR; R6; 1	**BAR**; **R7**; **1**	**BAR**; **R8**; **1**	**TOW**; **R9**; **1**	**TOW**; **R10**; **1**	SAN; R11; 9	SAN; R12; Ret	SAN; R13; 2	BAT; R14; 7	**HOM**; **R15**; **1**	HOM; R16; 1						**2nd**	**1650**
2017	MW Motorsport	Nissan L33 Altima	ADE; R1; 3	ADE; R2; 3	ADE; R3; 3	SYM; R4; 4	SYM; R5; 3	SYM; R6; 2	SYM; R7; 1	**PHI**; **R8**; **2**	PHI; R9; 1	**PHI**; **R10**; **1**	PHI; R11; 19	TOW; R12; 5	TOW; R13; 13	SMP; R14; 4	SMP; R15; 6	SMP; R16; 6	SMP; R17; Ret	SAN; R18; 2	SAN; R19; 1	NEW; R20; 4	NEW; R21; Ret	**3rd**	**1481**

=== Supercars Championship results ===
Supercars results
Year	Team	Car	1	2	3	4	5	6	7	8	9	10	11	12	13	14	15	16	17	18	19	20	21	22	23	24	25	26	27	28	29	30	31	32	33	34	35	36	37	Position	Points
2015	Erebus Motorsport	Mercedes-Benz E63 AMG	ADE; R1	ADE; R2	ADE; R3	SYM; R4	SYM; R5	SYM; R6	BAR; R7	BAR; R8	BAR; R9	WIN; R10; PO	WIN; R11; PO	WIN; R12; PO	HID; R13	HID; R14	HID; R15	TOW; R16	TOW; R17	QLD; R18; PO	QLD; R19; PO	QLD; R20; PO	SMP; R21	SMP; R22	SMP; R23	SAN; Q 18	SAN; R24; 19	BAT; R25; Ret	SUR; R26; 19	SUR; R27; DSQ	PUK; R28	PUK; R29	PUK; R30	PHI; R31	PHI; R32	PHI; R33	SYD; R34	SYD; R35	SYD; R36	51st	144
2016	Prodrive Racing Australia	Ford FG X Falcon	ADE; R1	ADE; R2	ADE; R3	SYM; R4	SYM; R5	PHI; R6	PHI; R7	BAR; R8	BAR; R9	WIN; R10; PO	WIN; R11; PO	HID; R12	HID; R13	TOW; R14	TOW; R15	QLD; R16; PO	QLD; R17; PO	SMP; R18	SMP; R19	SAN; Q 10	SAN; R20; Ret	BAT; R21; 4	SUR; R22; Ret	SUR; R23; 14	PUK; R24	PUK; R25	PUK; R26	PUK; R27	SYD; R28	SYD; R29								46th	303
2017	Nissan Motorsport	Nissan Altima L33	ADE; R1	ADE; R2	SYM; R3	SYM; R4	PHI; R5	PHI; R6	BAR; R7	BAR; R8	WIN; R9; PO	WIN; R10; PO					QLD; R15; PO	QLD; R16; PO			SAN; RQ; 19	SAN; R19; 16	BAT; R20; 7	SUR; R21; Ret	SUR; R22; 12	PUK; R23	PUK; R24	NEW; R25	NEW; R26											36th	485
2017	MW Motorsport	Nissan Altima L33											HID; R11; 19	HID; R12; 22	TOW; R13	TOW; R14	QLD; R15; 19	QLD; R16; Ret	SMP; R17	SMP; R18																				36th	485
2018	Tekno Autosports	Holden ZB Commodore	ADE; R1; 20	ADE; R2; 22	MEL; R3; 20	MEL; R4; 22	MEL; R5; 22	MEL; R6; 21	SYM; R7; 10	SYM; R8; 5	PHI; R9; 20	PHI; R10; 18	BAR; R11; 16	BAR; R12; 9	WIN; R13; 15	WIN; R14; 17	HID; R15; 18	HID; R16; Ret	TOW; R17; 22	TOW; R18; 18	QLD; R19; 21	QLD; R20; 10	SMP; R21; 9	BEN; R22; 16	BEN; R23; 18	SAN; QR; 20	SAN; R24; 22	BAT; R25; 15	SUR; R26; 16	SUR; R27; C	PUK; R28; 22	PUK; R29; 23	NEW; R30; 19	NEW; R31; 18						19th	1673
2019	Tekno Autosports	Holden ZB Commodore	ADE; R1; 20	ADE; R2; 21	MEL; R3; 20	MEL; R4; 20	MEL; R5; 15	MEL; R6; 23	SYM; R7; 22	SYM; R8; 22	PHI; R9; 20	PHI; R10; 20	BAR; R11; 20	BAR; R12; 22	WIN; R13; 20	WIN; R14; 20	HID; R15; Ret	HID; R16; 21	TOW; R17; 23	TOW; R18; 14	QLD; R19; 22	QLD; R20; 23	BEN; R21; 21	BEN; R22; 25	PUK; R23; 21	PUK; R24; 23	BAT; R25; 17	SUR; R26; 13	SUR; R27; 13	SAN; QR; 24	SAN; R28; 19	NEW; R29; Ret	NEW; R30; 17							22nd	1277
2020	Tickford Racing	Ford Mustang S550	ADE; R1; 16	ADE; R2; 12	MEL; R3; C	MEL; R4; C	MEL; R5; C	MEL; R6; C	SMP1; R7; 19	SMP1; R8; 14	SMP1; R9; 11	SMP2; R10; 16	SMP2; R11; 16	SMP2; R12; 1	HID1; R13; 14	HID1; R14; 15	HID1; R15; 8	HID2; R16; Ret	HID2; R17; 14	HID2; R18; 13	TOW1; R19; 15	TOW1; R20; 12	TOW1; R21; 16	TOW2; R22; 8	TOW2; R23; 7	TOW2; R24; 14	BEN1; R25; 2	BEN1; R26; 10	BEN1; R27; 21	BEN2; R28; 4	BEN2; R29; 13	BEN2; R30; 19	BAT; R31; 14							15th	1396
2021	Tickford Racing	Ford Mustang S550	BAT1; R1; 6	BAT1; R2; 19	SAN; R3; 10	SAN; R4; 12	SAN; R5; 16	SYM; R6; 12	SYM; R7; 21	SYM; R8; 19	BEN; R9; 10	BEN; R10; 12	BEN; R11; 22	HID; R12; 20	HID; R13; 11	HID; R14; 15	TOW1; R15; 15	TOW1; R16; 10	TOW2; R17; 14	TOW2; R18; 18	TOW2; R19; 13	SMP1; R20; 21	SMP1; R21; 14	SMP1; R22; 8	SMP2; R23; 6	SMP2; R24; 18	SMP2; R25; 14	SMP3; R26; 19	SMP3; R27; 14	SMP3; R28; 10	SMP4; R29; 11	SMP4; R30; C	BAT2; R31; 15							16th	1486
2022	Matt Stone Racing	Holden ZB Commodore	SMP; R1; 13	SMP; R2; 22	SYM; R3; Ret	SYM; R4; Ret	SYM; R5; 23	MEL; R6; 25	MEL; R7; 15	MEL; R8; 12	MEL; R9; 16	BAR; R10; 16	BAR; R11; 17	BAR; R12; 13	WIN; R13; 18	WIN; R14; 13	WIN; R15; 17	HID; R16; 13	HID; R17; 6	HID; R18; 13	TOW; R19; 10	TOW; R20; 14	BEN; R21; 21	BEN; R22; 15	BEN; R23; Ret	SAN; R24; 19	SAN; R25; 25	SAN; R26; Ret	PUK; R27; 23	PUK; R28; Ret	PUK; R29; 21	BAT; R30; 14	SUR; R31; 13	SUR; R32; 16	ADE; R33; 18	ADE; R34; Ret				21st	1237
2023	Matt Stone Racing	Chevrolet Camaro ZL1	NEW; R1; 9	NEW; R2; 8	MEL; R3; 8	MEL; R4; Ret	MEL; R5; 6	MEL; R6; 5	BAR; R7; 12	BAR; R8; 15	BAR; R9; 24	SYM; R10; 7	SYM; R11; 8	SYM; R12; 5	HID; R13; 11	HID; R14; 20	HID; R15; 1	TOW; R16; 12	TOW; R17; 10	SMP; R18; 4	SMP; R19; 10	BEN; R20; 15	BEN; R21; 25	BEN; R22; 10	SAN; R23; 16	BAT; R24; 9	SUR; R25; Ret	SUR; R26; 14	ADE; R27; 14	ADE; R28; 23										12th	1715
2024	Erebus Motorsport	Chevrolet Camaro ZL1	BAT1; R1; 13	BAT1; R2; 8	MEL; R3; 10	MEL; R4; 8	MEL; R5; 5	MEL; R6; Ret	TAU; R7; 5	TAU; R8; 8	BAR; R9; 20	BAR; R10; 23	HID; R11; 13	HID; R12; 6	TOW; R13; 6	TOW; R14; 4	SMP; R15; Ret	SMP; R16; 15	BEN; R17; 23	BEN; R18; 5	SAN; R19; 20	BAT; R20; 8	SUR; R21; 24	SUR; R22; 8	ADE; R23; WD	ADE; R24; WD														14th	1567
2025	Erebus Motorsport	Chevrolet Camaro ZL1	SMP; R1; 10	SMP; R2; 12	SMP; R3; 10	MEL; R4; 19	MEL; R5; Ret	MEL; R6; 19	MEL; R7; C	TAU; R8; 6	TAU; R9; 11	TAU; R10; 15	SYM; R11; 11	SYM; R12; 10	SYM; R13; 16	BAR; R14; 15	BAR; R15; 15	BAR; R16; 15	HID; R17; Ret	HID; R18; 14	HID; R19; 4	TOW; R20; 9	TOW; R21; 7	TOW; R22; 20	QLD; R23; 19	QLD; R24; Ret	QLD; R25; 12	BEN; R26; 12	BAT; R27; 14	SUR; R28; 15	SUR; R29; 15	SAN; R30; 24	SAN; R31; 16	ADE; R32; 21	ADE; R33; 22	ADE; R34; Ret				17th	1256
2026	Matt Stone Racing	Chevrolet Camaro ZL1	SMP; R1; 17	SMP; R2; 9	SMP; R3; 6	MEL; R4; 13	MEL; R5; 6	MEL; R6; 10	MEL; R7; 4	TAU; R8; 9	TAU; R9; 11	CHR; R10; 15	CHR; R11; 12	CHR; R12; 9	CHR; R13; 7	SYM; R14; 17	SYM; R15; 11	SYM; R16; 24	HID; R17; 24	HID; R18; 9	HID; R19; 8	TOW; R20; 11	TOW; R21; 9	TOW; R22; 9	BAR; R23; 11	BAR; R24; 13	BAR; R25; 15	QLD; R26; 21	QLD; R27; 12	QLD; R28; 20	BEN; R29; 10	BAT; R30; 4	SUR; R31; 22	SUR; R32; 21	SAN; R33; 16	SAN; R34; 11	ADE; R35	ADE; R36	ADE; R37	11th*	1709*

=== Complete Bathurst 1000 results ===
Year	Team	Car	Co-driver	Position	Laps
2015	Erebus Motorsport	Mercedes-Benz E63 AMG	(Australia) Ashley Walsh	DNF	135
2016	Prodrive Racing Australia	Ford Falcon FG X	(Australia) Cameron Waters	4th	161
2017	Nissan Motorsport	Nissan Altima L33	(Australia) Todd Kelly	7th	161
2018	Tekno Autosports	Holden Commodore ZB	(Australia) Jonathon Webb	15th	161
2019	Tekno Autosports	Holden Commodore ZB	(Australia) Jonathon Webb	17th	160
2020	Tickford Racing	Ford Mustang S550	(Australia) James Moffat	14th	161
2021	Tickford Racing	Ford Mustang S550	(Australia) Zak Best	15th	161
2022	Matt Stone Racing	Holden Commodore ZB	(Australia) Aaron Seton	14th	161
2023	Matt Stone Racing	Chevrolet Camaro Mk.6	(Australia) Jayden Ojeda	9th	161
2024	Erebus Motorsport	Chevrolet Camaro Mk.6	(Australia) Jayden Ojeda	8th	161
2025	Erebus Motorsport	Chevrolet Camaro Mk.6	(Australia) Jarrod Hughes	14th	161
2026	Matt Stone Racing	Chevrolet Camaro Mk.6	(Australia) Harri Jones	4th	161

==== Complete Bathurst 12 Hour results ====
Year	Team	Co-drivers	Car	Class	Laps	Pos.	Class pos.
2014	(Australia) Erebus Motorsport	(Australia) Greg Crick (Australia) Will Davison	Mercedes-Benz SLS AMG	A	296	**3rd**	**3rd**
2015	(Australia) Erebus Motorsport	(Australia) Dean Canto (Australia) Richard Muscat	Mercedes-Benz SLS AMG	AP	269	5th	4th
2024	(Australia) Erebus Motorsport	(Australia) Justin McMillan (Australia) Garth Walden (Australia) Glen Wood	Mercedes-AMG GT3 Evo	Pro-Am	259	18th	5th

=== Complete Bathurst 6 Hour results ===
Year	Team	Co-drivers	Car	Class	Laps	Pos.	Class pos.
2026	(Australia) Flipside Entry	(Australia) Amar Sharma (Australia) Grant Johnson	BMW M3 Competition	X	114	9th	**3rd**

Sporting positions
Preceded by Cam Waters	Australian Formula Ford Championship; Champion; 2012	Succeeded by Anton de Pasquale
