= 2018 Phillip Island 500 =

Motor racing event

(Victoria (state)) 2018 WD-40 Phillip Island 500
Event Information
- Round 4 of 16 in the 2018 Supercars Championship
- Date: 20–22 April 2018
- Location: Phillip Island, Victoria
- Venue: Phillip Island Grand Prix Circuit

Results
Race 1
Distance	57 laps	253.365 km
Pole position	(New Zealand) Scott McLaughlin; DJR Team Penske	1:29.5057
Winner	(New Zealand) Scott McLaughlin; DJR Team Penske	1:30:50.5676
Race 2
Distance	57 laps	253.365 km
Pole position	(New Zealand) Scott McLaughlin; DJR Team Penske	1:29.8526
Winner	(New Zealand) Scott McLaughlin; DJR Team Penske	1:33:03.5824

The 2018 Phillip Island 500 (formally known as the 2018 WD-40 Phillip Island 500) was a motor racing event for the Supercars Championship, held on 20–22 April 2018. The event was held at the Phillip Island Grand Prix Circuit on Phillip Island, Victoria, and consisted of two races, both 250 kilometres (57 laps) in length. It was the fourth event of sixteen in the 2018 Supercars Championship and hosted Races 9 and 10 of the season.

== Results ==
=== Practice ===
Practice summary
Session	Day	Fastest lap				
Session	Day	No.	Driver	Team	Car	Time
Practice 1	Friday	25	(Australia) James Courtney	Walkinshaw Andretti United	Holden Commodore ZB	1:30.6461
Practice 2	Friday	1	(Australia) Jamie Whincup	Triple Eight Race Engineering	Holden Commodore ZB	1:29.9856

=== Race 9 ===
==== Qualifying ====
Pos.	No.	Driver	Team	Car	Time	Gap	Grid
1	17	(New Zealand) Scott McLaughlin	DJR Team Penske	Ford Falcon FG X	1:29.5057		1
2	1	(Australia) Jamie Whincup	Triple Eight Race Engineering	Holden Commodore ZB	1:30.0523	+0.5466	2
3	97	(New Zealand) Shane van Gisbergen	Triple Eight Race Engineering	Holden Commodore ZB	1:30.1799	+0.6742	3
4	888	(Australia) Craig Lowndes	Triple Eight Race Engineering	Holden Commodore ZB	1:30.2002	+0.6945	4
5	15	(Australia) Rick Kelly	Nissan Motorsport	Nissan Altima L33	1:30.2634	+0.7578	5
6	9	(Australia) David Reynolds	Erebus Motorsport	Holden Commodore ZB	1:30.2979	+0.7922	6
7	55	(Australia) Chaz Mostert	Tickford Racing	Ford Falcon FG X	1:30.3156	+0.8099	7
8	99	(Australia) Anton de Pasquale	Erebus Motorsport	Holden Commodore ZB	1:30.3559	+0.8502	8
9	6	(Australia) Cam Waters	Tickford Racing	Ford Falcon FG X	1:30.4385	+0.9329	9
10	230	(Australia) Will Davison	23Red Racing	Ford Falcon FG X	1:30.4598	+0.9541	10
11	200	(Australia) Mark Winterbottom	Tickford Racing	Ford Falcon FG X	1:30.5130	+1.0073	11
12	8	(Australia) Nick Percat	Brad Jones Racing	Holden Commodore ZB	1:30.5288	+1.0232	12
13	14	(Australia) Tim Slade	Brad Jones Racing	Holden Commodore ZB	1:30.5411	+1.0354	13
14	33	(Australia) Garth Tander	Garry Rogers Motorsport	Holden Commodore ZB	1:30.5849	+1.0792	14
15	2	(Australia) Scott Pye	Walkinshaw Andretti United	Holden Commodore ZB	1:30.5859	+1.0802	15
16	25	(Australia) James Courtney	Walkinshaw Andretti United	Holden Commodore ZB	1:30.7874	+1.2817	16
17	19	(Australia) Jack Le Brocq	Tekno Autosports	Holden Commodore ZB	1:30.7876	+1.2819	17
18	56	(New Zealand) Richie Stanaway	Tickford Racing	Ford Falcon FG X	1:30.8276	+1.3219	18
19	34	(Australia) James Golding	Garry Rogers Motorsport	Holden Commodore ZB	1:30.8359	+1.3302	19
20	7	(New Zealand) Andre Heimgartner	Nissan Motorsport	Nissan Altima L33	1:31.0079	+1.5022	20
21	18	(Australia) Lee Holdsworth	Team 18	Holden Commodore ZB	1:31.0259	+1.5203	21
22	35	(Australia) Todd Hazelwood	Matt Stone Racing	Ford Falcon FG X	1:31.1049	+1.5992	22
23	21	(Australia) Tim Blanchard	Tim Blanchard Racing	Holden Commodore ZB	1:31.3402	+1.8345	23
24	78	(Switzerland) Simona de Silvestro	Nissan Motorsport	Nissan Altima L33	1:31.4633	+1.9576	24
25	23	(Australia) Michael Caruso	Nissan Motorsport	Nissan Altima L33	No time^{1}	–	25
DSQ	12	(New Zealand) Fabian Coulthard	DJR Team Penske	Ford Falcon FG X	No time^{2}	–	26^{2}

Notes

- ^1 – Michael Caruso had his best lap-time deleted for stopping on track, causing a red flag.
- ^2 – Fabian Coulthard was excluded due to his No.12 Ford Falcon FG X running too much rear wing angle and will start from the back of the grid.

==== Race ====
Pos	No.	Driver	Team	Car	Laps	Time / Retired	Grid	Points
1	17	(New Zealand) Scott McLaughlin	DJR Team Penske	Ford Falcon FG X	57	1:30:50.5676	1	150
2	15	(Australia) Rick Kelly	Nissan Motorsport	Nissan Altima L33	57	+2.4038	5	138
3	97	(New Zealand) Shane van Gisbergen	Triple Eight Race Engineering	Holden Commodore ZB	57	+9.0837	3	129
4	888	(Australia) Craig Lowndes	Triple Eight Race Engineering	Holden Commodore ZB	57	+12.2829	4	120
5	55	(Australia) Chaz Mostert	Tickford Racing	Ford Falcon FG X	57	+13.5567	7	111
6	9	(Australia) David Reynolds	Erebus Motorsport	Holden Commodore ZB	57	+18.3329	6	102
7	99	(Australia) Anton de Pasquale	Erebus Motorsport	Holden Commodore ZB	57	+18.8542	8	96
8	230	(Australia) Will Davison	23Red Racing	Ford Falcon FG X	57	+31.5392	10	90
9	2	(Australia) Scott Pye	Walkinshaw Andretti United	Holden Commodore ZB	57	+32.3435	15	84
10	14	(Australia) Tim Slade	Brad Jones Racing	Holden Commodore ZB	57	+32.4920	13	78
11	33	(Australia) Garth Tander	Garry Rogers Motorsport	Holden Commodore ZB	57	+33.6020	14	72
12	12	(New Zealand) Fabian Coulthard	DJR Team Penske	Ford Falcon FG X	57	+33.9457	26	69
13	200	(Australia) Mark Winterbottom	Tickford Racing	Ford Falcon FG X	57	+34.4536	11	66
14	1	(Australia) Jamie Whincup	Triple Eight Race Engineering	Holden Commodore ZB	57	+38.8961^{1}	2	63
15	7	(New Zealand) Andre Heimgartner	Nissan Motorsport	Nissan Altima L33	57	+39.7996	20	60
16	6	(Australia) Cam Waters	Tickford Racing	Ford Falcon FG X	57	+44.9287	9	57
17	25	(Australia) James Courtney	Walkinshaw Andretti United	Holden Commodore ZB	57	+45.4025	16	54
18	23	(Australia) Michael Caruso	Nissan Motorsport	Nissan Altima L33	57	+45.8549	25	51
19	56	(New Zealand) Richie Stanaway	Tickford Racing	Ford Falcon FG X	57	+53.3512	18	48
20	19	(Australia) Jack Le Brocq	Tekno Autosports	Holden Commodore ZB	57	+54.8943	17	45
21	21	(Australia) Tim Blanchard	Tim Blanchard Racing	Holden Commodore ZB	57	+1:12.6002	23	42
22	18	(Australia) Lee Holdsworth	Team 18	Holden Commodore ZB	57	+1:13.4714	21	39
23	35	(Australia) Todd Hazelwood	Matt Stone Racing	Ford Falcon FG X	57	+1:28.8660	22	36
24	78	(Switzerland) Simona de Silvestro	Nissan Motorsport	Nissan Altima L33	57	+1:39.1808^{2}	24	33
25	34	(Australia) James Golding	Garry Rogers Motorsport	Holden Commodore ZB	50	+7 laps	19	30
26	8	(Australia) Nick Percat	Brad Jones Racing	Holden Commodore ZB	45	+12 laps	12	27
Fastest lap: Scott McLaughlin (DJR Team Penske) 1:32.1584 (on lap 3)

Notes

- ^1 – Jamie Whincup received a post-race Pit-Lane Penalty equivalent Time Penalty (38 seconds) for speeding in the pit-lane.
- ^2 – Simona de Silvestro received a 15-second post-race Time Penalty for Careless Driving, causing contact with Jack Le Brocq.

==== Championship standings after Race 9 ====
Drivers Championship

	Pos	Driver	Pts	Gap
1	1	(New Zealand) Scott McLaughlin	797	
	2	(Australia) David Reynolds	749	-48
2	3	(New Zealand) Shane van Gisbergen	747	-50
3	4	(Australia) Jamie Whincup	721	-76
1	5	(Australia) Craig Lowndes	717	-80

Teams Championship

	Pos	Team	Pts	Gap
	1	Triple Eight Race Engineering (1, 97)	1468	
	2	Walkinshaw Andretti United	1351	-117
	3	DJR Team Penske	1339	-129
1	4	Tickford Racing (5, 55)	1132	-336
1	5	Erebus Motorsport	1099	-369

- Note: Only the top five positions are included for both sets of standings.

=== Race 10 ===
==== Qualifying ====
Pos.	No.	Driver	Team	Car	Time	Gap	Grid
1	17	(New Zealand) Scott McLaughlin	DJR Team Penske	Ford Falcon FG X	1:29.8526		1
2	9	(Australia) David Reynolds	Erebus Motorsport	Holden Commodore ZB	1:30.2540	+0.4014	2
3	12	(New Zealand) Fabian Coulthard	DJR Team Penske	Ford Falcon FG X	1:30.3903	+0.5377	3
4	15	(Australia) Rick Kelly	Nissan Motorsport	Nissan Altima L33	1:30.3987	+0.5462	4
5	1	(Australia) Jamie Whincup	Triple Eight Race Engineering	Holden Commodore ZB	1:30.4956	+0.6430	5
6	23	(Australia) Michael Caruso	Nissan Motorsport	Nissan Altima L33	1:30.4973	+0.6447	6
7	25	(Australia) James Courtney	Walkinshaw Andretti United	Holden Commodore ZB	1:30.5322	+0.6796	7
8	99	(Australia) Anton de Pasquale	Erebus Motorsport	Holden Commodore ZB	1:30.5847	+0.7321	8
9	97	(New Zealand) Shane van Gisbergen	Triple Eight Race Engineering	Holden Commodore ZB	1:30.6055	+0.7529	9
10	200	(Australia) Mark Winterbottom	Tickford Racing	Ford Falcon FG X	1:30.6669	+0.8143	10
11	55	(Australia) Chaz Mostert	Tickford Racing	Ford Falcon FG X	1:30.6693	+0.8167	11
12	2	(Australia) Scott Pye	Walkinshaw Andretti United	Holden Commodore ZB	1:30.6884	+0.8358	12
13	888	(Australia) Craig Lowndes	Triple Eight Race Engineering	Holden Commodore ZB	1:30.7717	+0.9191	13
14	18	(Australia) Lee Holdsworth	Team 18	Holden Commodore ZB	1:30.7770	+0.9244	14
15	33	(Australia) Garth Tander	Garry Rogers Motorsport	Holden Commodore ZB	1:30.8241	+0.9715	15
16	6	(Australia) Cam Waters	Tickford Racing	Ford Falcon FG X	1:30.8540	+1.0014	16
17	14	(Australia) Tim Slade	Brad Jones Racing	Holden Commodore ZB	1:30.8549	+1.0023	17
18	34	(Australia) James Golding	Garry Rogers Motorsport	Holden Commodore ZB	1:30.9179	+1.0653	18
19	78	(Switzerland) Simona de Silvestro	Nissan Motorsport	Nissan Altima L33	1:31.0468	+1.1942	19
20	7	(New Zealand) Andre Heimgartner	Nissan Motorsport	Nissan Altima L33	1:31.0634	+1.2108	20
21	19	(Australia) Jack Le Brocq	Tekno Autosports	Holden Commodore ZB	1:31.0669	+1.2144	21
22	230	(Australia) Will Davison	23Red Racing	Ford Falcon FG X	1:31.2412	+1.3886	22
23	56	(New Zealand) Richie Stanaway	Tickford Racing	Ford Falcon FG X	1:31.2453	+1.3927	23
24	35	(Australia) Todd Hazelwood	Matt Stone Racing	Ford Falcon FG X	1:31.5312	+1.6786	24
25	21	(Australia) Tim Blanchard	Tim Blanchard Racing	Holden Commodore ZB	1:31.7609	+1.9083	25
26	8	(Australia) Nick Percat	Brad Jones Racing	Holden Commodore ZB	1:32.4937	+2.6411	26

==== Race ====
Pos	No.	Driver	Team	Car	Laps	Time / Retired	Grid	Points
1	17	(New Zealand) Scott McLaughlin	DJR Team Penske	Ford Falcon FG X	57	1:33:03.5824	1	150
2	9	(Australia) David Reynolds	Erebus Motorsport	Holden Commodore ZB	57	+0.6687	2	138
3	15	(Australia) Rick Kelly	Nissan Motorsport	Nissan Altima L33	57	+3.9492	4	129
4	12	(New Zealand) Fabian Coulthard	DJR Team Penske	Ford Falcon FG X	57	+5.2145	3	120
5	23	(Australia) Michael Caruso	Nissan Motorsport	Nissan Altima L33	57	+11.5940	6	111
6	97	(New Zealand) Shane van Gisbergen	Triple Eight Race Engineering	Holden Commodore ZB	57	+12.5414	9	102
7	888	(Australia) Craig Lowndes	Triple Eight Race Engineering	Holden Commodore ZB	57	+14.3439	13	96
8	55	(Australia) Chaz Mostert	Tickford Racing	Ford Falcon FG X	57	+19.2028	11	90
9	1	(Australia) Jamie Whincup	Triple Eight Race Engineering	Holden Commodore ZB	57	+23.3350	5	84
10	33	(Australia) Garth Tander	Garry Rogers Motorsport	Holden Commodore ZB	57	+27.8983	15	78
11	2	(Australia) Scott Pye	Walkinshaw Andretti United	Holden Commodore ZB	57	+28.4272	12	72
12	14	(Australia) Tim Slade	Brad Jones Racing	Holden Commodore ZB	57	+28.6925	17	69
13	8	(Australia) Nick Percat	Brad Jones Racing	Holden Commodore ZB	57	+32.2451	26	66
14	7	(New Zealand) Andre Heimgartner	Nissan Motorsport	Nissan Altima L33	57	+36.1674	20	63
15	200	(Australia) Mark Winterbottom	Tickford Racing	Ford Falcon FG X	57	+40.6775	10	60
16	99	(Australia) Anton de Pasquale	Erebus Motorsport	Holden Commodore ZB	57	+43.6458	8	57
17	6	(Australia) Cam Waters	Tickford Racing	Ford Falcon FG X	57	+51.6179	16	54
18	19	(Australia) Jack Le Brocq	Tekno Autosports	Holden Commodore ZB	57	+56.2108	21	51
19	34	(Australia) James Golding	Garry Rogers Motorsport	Holden Commodore ZB	57	+59.1143	18	48
20	56	(New Zealand) Richie Stanaway	Tickford Racing	Ford Falcon FG X	57	+1:01.5723	23	45
21	230	(Australia) Will Davison	23Red Racing	Ford Falcon FG X	57	+1:02.7695	22	42
22	78	(Switzerland) Simona de Silvestro	Nissan Motorsport	Nissan Altima L33	57	+1:03.4784	19	39
23	21	(Australia) Tim Blanchard	Tim Blanchard Racing	Holden Commodore ZB	57	+1:03.9353	25	36
24	35	(Australia) Todd Hazelwood	Matt Stone Racing	Ford Falcon FG X	57	+1:12.8499	24	33
25	18	(Australia) Lee Holdsworth	Team 18	Holden Commodore ZB	46	+11 laps	14	30
NC	25	(Australia) James Courtney	Walkinshaw Andretti United	Holden Commodore ZB	5	Retirement	7	
Fastest lap: Scott McLaughlin (DJR Team Penske) 1:32.0806 (on lap 5)

==== Championship standings after Race 10 ====
Drivers Championship

	Pos	Driver	Pts	Gap
	1	(New Zealand) Scott McLaughlin	947	
	2	(Australia) David Reynolds	887	-60
	3	(New Zealand) Shane van Gisbergen	849	-98
1	4	(Australia) Craig Lowndes	813	-134
1	5	(Australia) Jamie Whincup	805	-142

Teams Championship

	Pos	Team	Pts	Gap
	1	Triple Eight Race Engineering (1, 97)	1654	
1	2	DJR Team Penske	1609	-45
1	3	Walkinshaw Andretti United	1423	-231
1	4	Erebus Motorsport	1294	-360
1	5	Tickford Racing (5, 55)	1282	-372

- Note: Only the top five positions are included for both sets of standings.
