= 2018 Auckland SuperSprint =

2018 V8 Supercar championship race

(New Zealand) 2018 ITM Auckland SuperSprint
Event Information
- Round 15 of 16 in the 2018 Supercars Championship
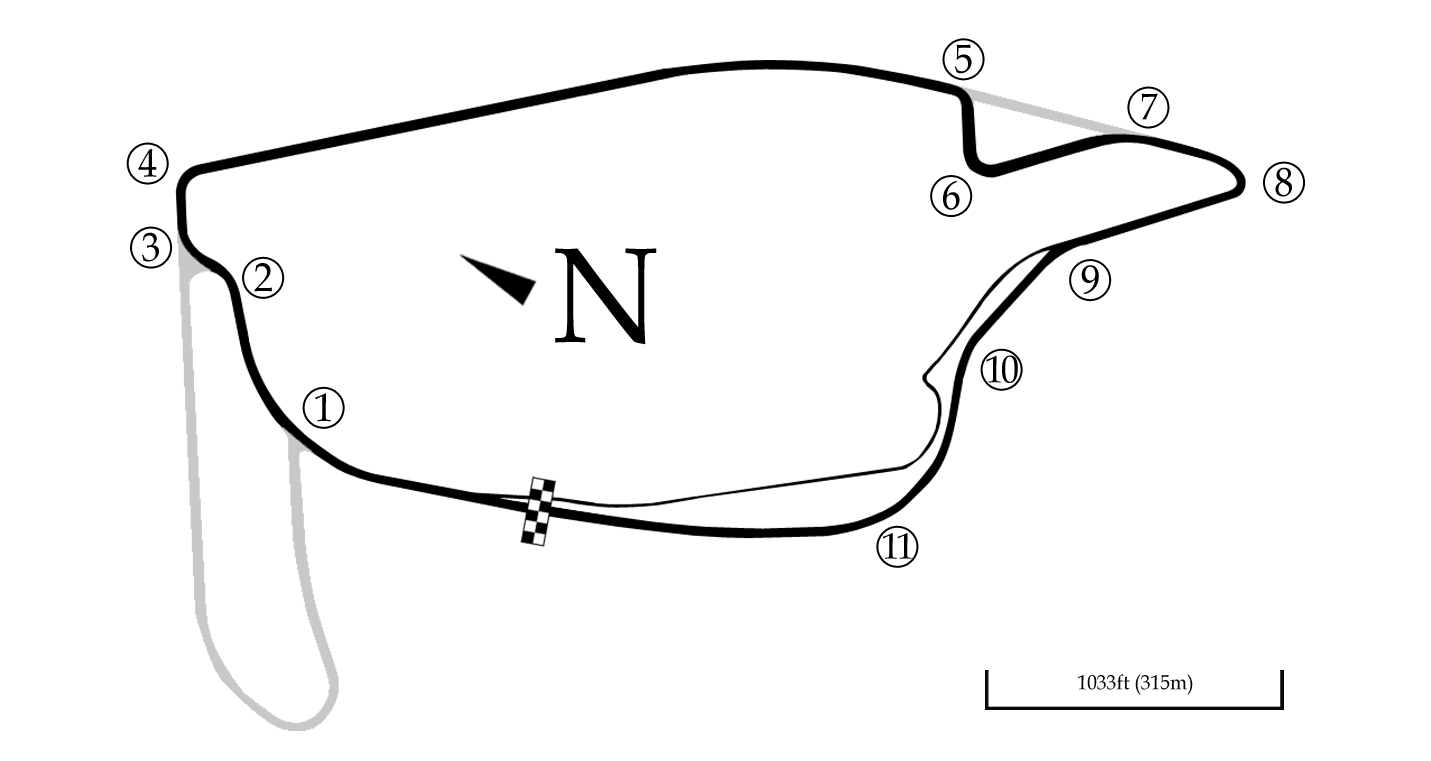
- Date: 2–4 November 2018
- Location: Pukekohe, New Zealand
- Venue: Pukekohe Park Raceway

Results
Race 1
Distance	70 laps	200 km
Pole position	Scott McLaughlin; DJR Team Penske	1:02.5708
Winner	Shane van Gisbergen; Triple Eight Race Engineering	1:22:38.1009
Race 2
Distance	70 laps	200 km
Pole position	Jamie Whincup; Triple Eight Race Engineering	1:02.4719
Winner	Scott McLaughlin; DJR Team Penske	1:17:05.3846

The 2018 ITM Auckland SuperSprint was a motor racing event for Supercars, held on the weekend of 2 to 4 November 2018. The event was held at Pukekohe Park Raceway near Pukekohe, New Zealand, and consisted of two races, 200 kilometres in length. It was the 15th event of sixteen in the 2017 Supercars Championship and hosted races 28 and 29 of the season. It was the thirteenth running of the Auckland SuperSprint.

== Report ==
=== Practice ===
Practice summary
Session	Day	Fastest lap				
Session	Day	No.	Driver	Team	Car	Time
P1	Friday	17	(New Zealand) Scott McLaughlin	DJR Team Penske	Ford Falcon (FG X)	1:03.1150
P2	Friday	1	(Australia) Jamie Whincup	Triple Eight Race Engineering	Holden Commodore (ZB)	1:02.6575
P3	Saturday	55	(Australia) Chaz Mostert	Tickford Racing	Ford Falcon (FG X)	1:10.3494

=== Race 28 ===
==== Qualifying ====
Pos	No	Driver	Team	Vehicle	Time
1	17	(New Zealand) Scott McLaughlin	DJR Team Penske	Ford Falcon (FG X)	1:02.5708
2	97	(New Zealand) Shane van Gisbergen	Triple Eight Race Engineering	Holden Commodore (ZB)	1:02.6880
3	9	(Australia) David Reynolds	Erebus Motorsport	Holden Commodore (ZB)	1:02.8110
4	55	(Australia) Chaz Mostert	Tickford Racing	Ford Falcon (FG X)	1:02.9312
5	1	(Australia) Jamie Whincup	Triple Eight Race Engineering	Holden Commodore (ZB)	1:02.9870
6	8	(Australia) Nick Percat	Brad Jones Racing	Holden Commodore (ZB)	1:02.9996
7	14	(Australia) Tim Slade	Brad Jones Racing	Holden Commodore (ZB)	1:03.0003
8	6	(Australia) Cameron Waters	Tickford Racing	Ford Falcon (FG X)	1:03.0482
9	15	(Australia) Rick Kelly	Nissan Motorsport	Nissan Altima (L33)	1:03.0848
10	99	(Australia) Anton de Pasquale	Erebus Motorsport	Holden Commodore (ZB)	1:03.1172
11	7	(New Zealand) Andre Heimgartner	Nissan Motorsport	Nissan Altima (L33)	1:03.1510
12	56	(New Zealand) Richie Stanaway	Tickford Racing	Ford Falcon (FG X)	1:03.1612
13	18	(Australia) Lee Holdsworth	Team 18	Holden Commodore (ZB)	1:03.1622
14	5	(Australia) Mark Winterbottom	Tickford Racing	Ford Falcon (FG X)	1:03.1907
15	25	(Australia) James Courtney	Walkinshaw Andretti United	Holden Commodore (ZB)	1:03.2107
16	2	(Australia) Scott Pye	Walkinshaw Andretti United	Holden Commodore (ZB)	1:03.2199
17	23	(Australia) Michael Caruso	Nissan Motorsport	Nissan Altima (L33)	1:03.3233
18	888	(Australia) Craig Lowndes	Triple Eight Race Engineering	Holden Commodore (ZB)	1:03.3532
19	12	(New Zealand) Fabian Coulthard	DJR Team Penske	Ford Falcon (FG X)	1:03.4380
20	33	(Australia) Garth Tander	Garry Rogers Motorsport	Holden Commodore (ZB)	1:03.4982
21	19	(Australia) Jack Le Brocq	Tekno Autosports	Holden Commodore (ZB)	1:02.9870
22	230	(Australia) Will Davison	23Red Racing	Ford Falcon (FG X)	1:03.5281
23	21	(Australia) Tim Blanchard	Tim Blanchard Racing	Holden Commodore (ZB)	1:03.5733
24	34	(Australia) James Golding	Garry Rogers Motorsport	Holden Commodore (ZB)	1:03.5979
25	35	(Australia) Todd Hazelwood	Matt Stone Racing	Holden Commodore (VF)	1:03.6413
26	78	(Switzerland) Simona de Silvestro	Nissan Motorsport	Nissan Altima (L33)	1:03.6477

==== Race ====
Pos.	No.	Name	Team	Laps	Time	Grid
1	97	(New Zealand) Shane van Gisbergen	Triple Eight Race Engineering	70	1hr 22min 38.1009sec	
2	17	(New Zealand) Scott McLaughlin	DJR Team Penske	70		
3	55	(Australia) Chaz Mostert	Tickford Racing	70		
4	9	(Australia) David Reynolds	Erebus Motorsport	70		
5	1	(Australia) Jamie Whincup	Triple Eight Race Engineering	70		
6	2	(Australia) Scott Pye	Walkinshaw Andretti United	70		
7	6	(Australia) Cam Waters	Tickford Racing	70		
8	8	(Australia) Nick Percat	Brad Jones Racing	70		
9	25	(Australia) James Courtney	Walkinshaw Andretti United	70		
10	23	(Australia) Michael Caruso	Nissan Motorsport	70		
11	888	(Australia) Craig Lowndes	Triple Eight Race Engineering	70		
12	21	(Australia) Tim Blanchard	Tim Blanchard Racing	70		
13	5	(Australia) Mark Winterbottom	Tickford Racing	70		
14	34	(Australia) James Golding	Garry Rogers Motorsport	70		
15	18	(Australia) Lee Holdsworth	Team 18	70		
16	15	(Australia) Rick Kelly	Nissan Motorsport	70		
17	14	(Australia) Tim Slade	Brad Jones Racing	70		
18	7	(New Zealand) Andre Heimgartner	Nissan Motorsport	70		
19	99	(Australia) Anton de Pasquale	Erebus Motorsport	70		
20	230	(Australia) Will Davison	23Red Racing	70		
21	78	(Switzerland) Simona de Silvestro	Nissan Motorsport	70		
22	19	(Australia) Jack Le Brocq	Tekno Autosports	69	+ 1 lap	
23	56	(New Zealand) Richie Stanaway	Tickford Racing	69	+ 1 lap	
24	35	(Australia) Todd Hazelwood	Matt Stone Racing	68	+ 2 laps	
25	33	(Australia) Garth Tander	Garry Rogers Motorsport	59	+ 11 laps	
Ret	12	(New Zealand) Fabian Coulthard	DJR Team Penske	6	Accident	
Fastest lap: Scott McLaughlin (DJR Team Penske), 1:03.2734

=== Race 29 ===
==== Qualifying ====
Pos	No	Driver	Team	Vehicle	Time
1	9	(Australia) David Reynolds	Erebus Motorsport	Holden Commodore (ZB)	1:02.6449
2	17	(New Zealand) Scott McLaughlin	DJR Team Penske	Ford Falcon (FG X)	1:02.6706
3	97	(New Zealand) Shane van Gisbergen	Triple Eight Race Engineering	Holden Commodore (ZB)	1:02.7197
4	1	(Australia) Jamie Whincup	Triple Eight Race Engineering	Holden Commodore (ZB)	1:02.7224
5	55	(Australia) Chaz Mostert	Tickford Racing	Ford Falcon (FG X)	1:02.7753
6	12	(New Zealand) Fabian Coulthard	DJR Team Penske	Ford Falcon (FG X)	1:02.8428
7	99	(Australia) Anton de Pasquale	Erebus Motorsport	Holden Commodore (ZB)	1:02.8483
8	56	(New Zealand) Richie Stanaway	Tickford Racing	Ford Falcon (FG X)	1:02.8648
9	6	(Australia) Cam Waters	Tickford Racing	Ford Falcon (FG X)	1:02.8750
10	7	(New Zealand) Andre Heimgartner	Nissan Motorsport	Nissan Altima (L33)	1:02.9015
11	888	(Australia) Craig Lowndes	Triple Eight Race Engineering	Holden Commodore (ZB)	1:02.9226
12	14	(Australia) Tim Slade	Brad Jones Racing	Holden Commodore (ZB)	1:02.9230
13	8	(Australia) Nick Percat	Brad Jones Racing	Holden Commodore (ZB)	1:03.0480
14	5	(Australia) Mark Winterbottom	Tickford Racing	Ford Falcon (FG X)	1:03.0507
15	21	(Australia) Tim Blanchard	Tim Blanchard Racing	Holden Commodore (ZB)	1:03.1316
16	78	(Switzerland) Simona de Silvestro	Nissan Motorsport	Nissan Altima (L33)	1:03.1411
17	15	(Australia) Rick Kelly	Nissan Motorsport	Nissan Altima (L33)	1:03.1506
18	18	(Australia) Lee Holdsworth	Team 18	Holden Commodore (ZB)	1:03.1936
19	23	(Australia) Michael Caruso	Nissan Motorsport	Nissan Altima (L33)	1:03.1995
20	2	(Australia) Scott Pye	Walkinshaw Andretti United	Holden Commodore (ZB)	1:03.2345
21	25	(Australia) James Courtney	Walkinshaw Andretti United	Holden Commodore (ZB)	1:03.2491
22	230	(Australia) Will Davison	23Red Racing	Ford Falcon (FG X)	1:03.3083
23	33	(Australia) Garth Tander	Garry Rogers Motorsport	Holden Commodore (ZB)	1:03.3175
24	34	(Australia) James Golding	Garry Rogers Motorsport	Holden Commodore (ZB)	1:03.3603
25	19	(Australia) Jack Le Brocq	Tekno Autosports	Holden Commodore (ZB)	1:03.4598
26	35	(Australia) Todd Hazelwood	Matt Stone Racing	Holden Commodore (VF)	1:03.8649

==== Top Ten Shootout ====
Pos	No	Driver	Team	Vehicle	Time
1	1	(Australia) Jamie Whincup	Triple Eight Race Engineering	Holden Commodore (ZB)	1:02.4719
2	17	(New Zealand) Scott McLaughlin	DJR Team Penske	Ford Falcon (FG X)	1:02.4877
3	97	(New Zealand) Shane van Gisbergen	Triple Eight Race Engineering	Holden Commodore (ZB)	1:02.6060
4	55	(Australia) Chaz Mostert	Tickford Racing	Ford Falcon (FG X)	1:02.6550
5	9	(Australia) David Reynolds	Erebus Motorsport	Holden Commodore (ZB)	1:02.6659
6	12	(New Zealand) Fabian Coulthard	DJR Team Penske	Ford Falcon (FG X)	1:02.7454
7	56	(New Zealand) Richie Stanaway	Tickford Racing	Ford Falcon (FG X)	1:02.7961
8	99	(Australia) Anton de Pasquale	Erebus Motorsport	Holden Commodore (ZB)	1:02.9044
9	6	(Australia) Cam Waters	Tickford Racing	Ford Falcon (FG X)	1:02.9873
10	7	(New Zealand) Andre Heimgartner	Nissan Motorsport	Nissan Altima (L33)	1:03.4281

==== Race ====
Pos.	No.	Name	Team	Laps	Time	Grid
1	17	(New Zealand) Scott McLaughlin	DJR Team Penske	70	1hr 17min 05.3846sec	
2	97	(New Zealand) Shane van Gisbergen	Triple Eight Race Engineering	70		
3	1	(Australia) Jamie Whincup	Triple Eight Race Engineering	70		
4	888	(Australia) Craig Lowndes	Triple Eight Race Engineering	70		
5	9	(Australia) David Reynolds	Erebus Motorsport	70		
6	55	(Australia) Chaz Mostert	Tickford Racing	70		
7	12	(New Zealand) Fabian Coulthard	DJR Team Penske	70		
8	7	(New Zealand) Andre Heimgartner	Nissan Motorsport	70		
9	5	(Australia) Mark Winterbottom	Tickford Racing	70		
10	8	(Australia) Nick Percat	Brad Jones Racing	70		
11	14	(Australia) Tim Slade	Brad Jones Racing	70		
12	6	(Australia) Cam Waters	Tickford Racing	70		
13	33	(Australia) Garth Tander	Garry Rogers Motorsport	70		
14	18	(Australia) Lee Holdsworth	Team 18	70		
15	2	(Australia) Scott Pye	Walkinshaw Andretti United	70		
16	25	(Australia) James Courtney	Walkinshaw Andretti United	70		
17	23	(Australia) Michael Caruso	Nissan Motorsport	70		
18	78	(Switzerland) Simona de Silvestro	Nissan Motorsport	70		
19	230	(Australia) Will Davison	Nissan Motorsport	70		
20	56	(New Zealand) Richie Stanaway	Tickford Racing	70		
21	34	(Australia) James Golding	Garry Rogers Motorsport	70		
22	15	(Australia) Rick Kelly	Nissan Motorsport	69	+ 1 lap	
23	19	(Australia) Jack Le Brocq	Tekno Autosports	69	+ 1 lap	
24	99	(Australia) Anton de Pasquale	Erebus Motorsport	69	+ 1 lap	
25	35	(Australia) Todd Hazelwood	Matt Stone Racing	69	+ 1 lap	
26	21	(Australia) Tim Blanchard	Tim Blanchard Racing	60	+ 10 laps	
Fastest lap: Jamie Whincup (Triple Eight Race Engineering), 1:03.4030
