= 2018 Newcastle 500 =

2018 V8 Supercar championship race

(New South Wales) 2018 Coates Hire Newcastle 500
Event Information
- Round 16 of 16 in the 2018 Supercars Championship
- Date: 23–25 November 2018
- Location: Newcastle East, New South Wales
- Venue: Newcastle Street Circuit
- Weather: Friday: Fine & Windy; Saturday: Fine; Sunday: Fine

Results
Race 1
| Distance | 95 laps | 250 km |
| Pole position | (New Zealand) Shane van Gisbergen; Triple Eight Race Engineering | 1:10.6430 |
| Winner | (New Zealand) Scott McLaughlin; DJR Team Penske | 2:00:22.3235 |
Race 2
| Distance | 95 laps | 250 km |
| Pole position | (Australia) David Reynolds; Erebus Motorsport | 1:10.5470 |
| Winner | (Australia) David Reynolds; Erebus Motorsport | 1:57:05.1149 |

The 2018 Coates Hire Newcastle 500 was a motor racing event for the Supercars Championship, held on the weekend of 23 to 25 November 2018. The event was held on the Newcastle Street Circuit in Newcastle East, New South Wales and consisted of two races, 250 kilometres in length. It was the sixteenth and final event in the 2018 Supercars Championship and hosted Races 30 and 31 of the season.

== Results ==
=== Race 30 ===
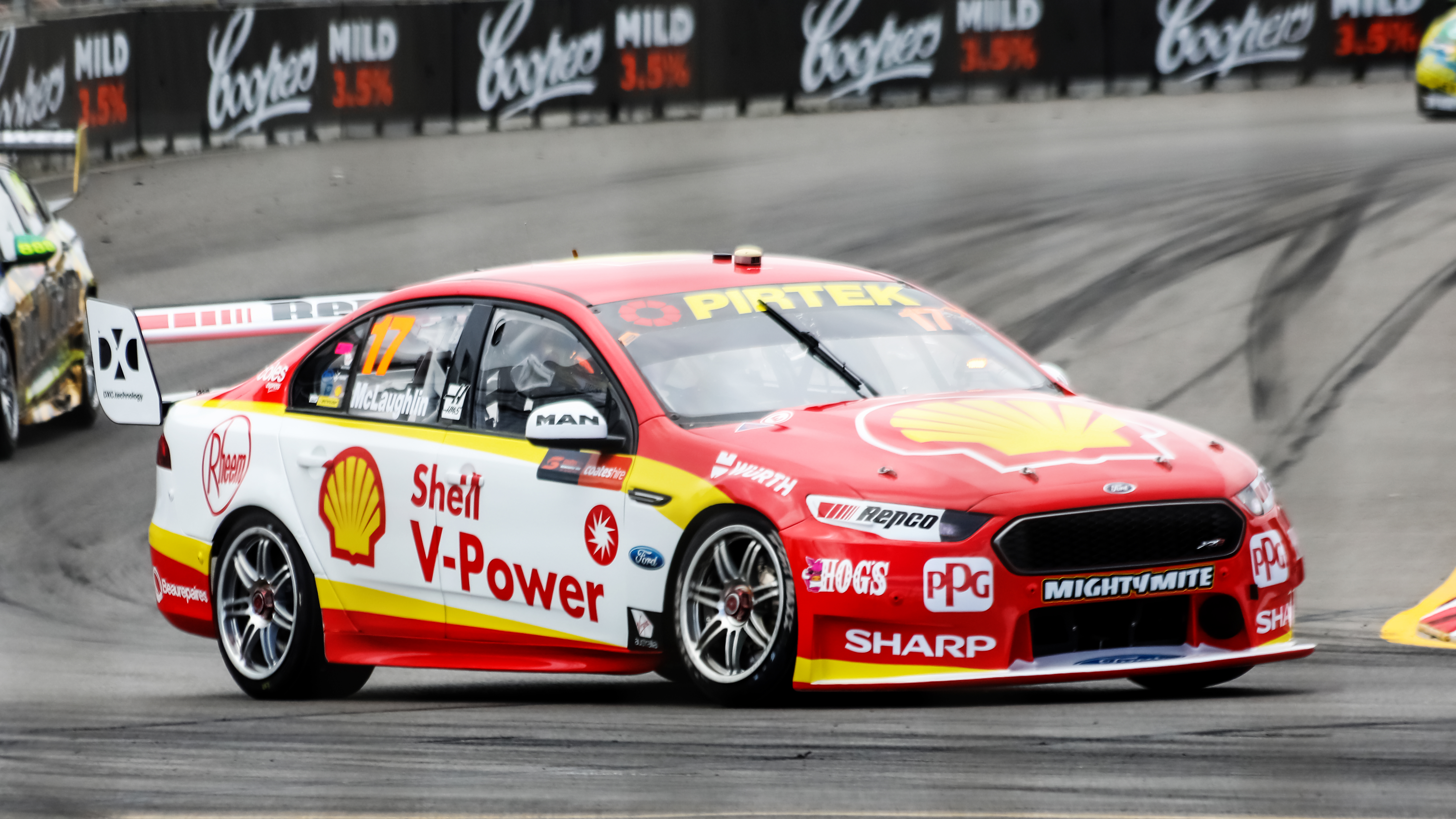
Scott McLaughlin was awarded the win in the first race following a post-race penalty for Shane van Gisbergen.

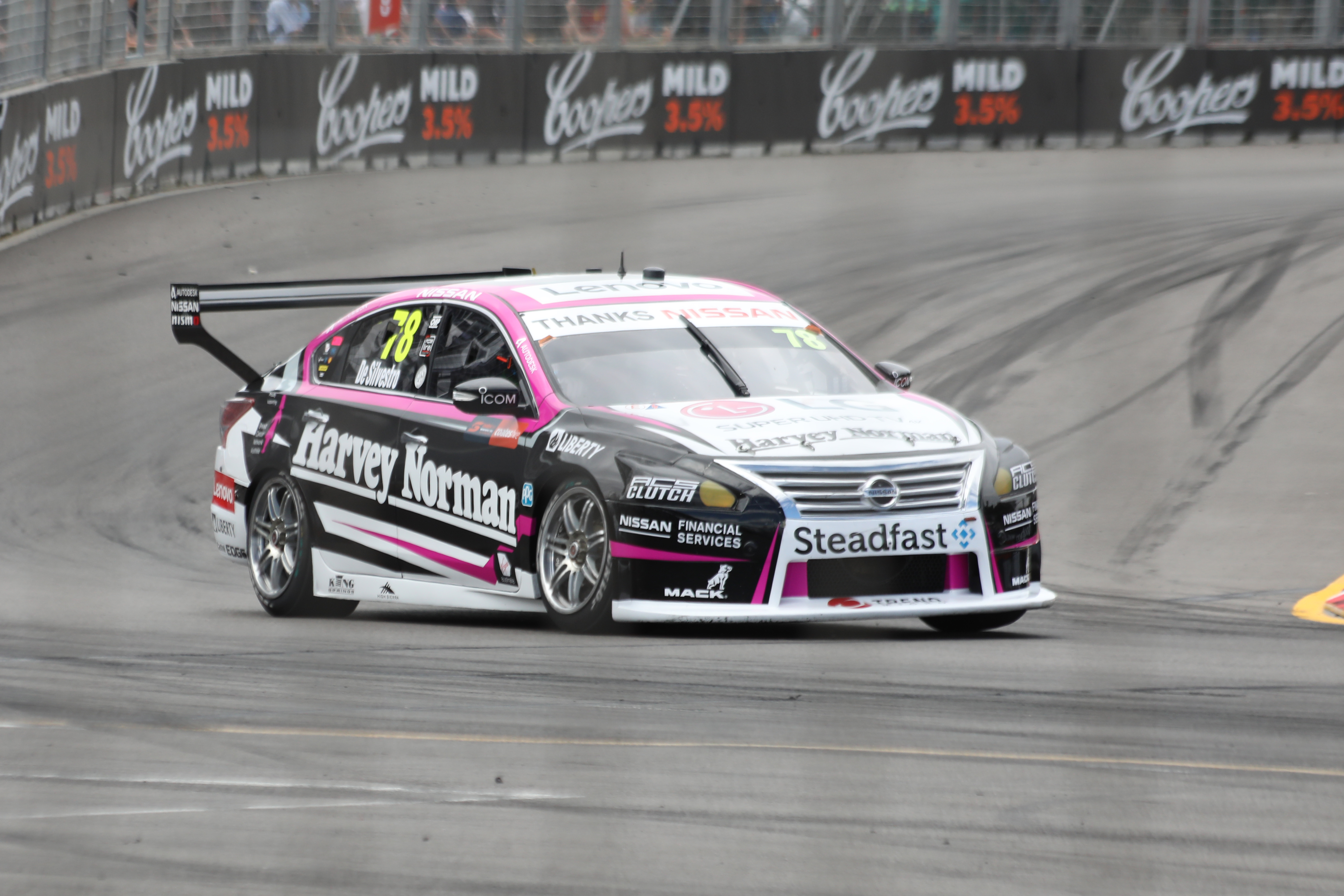
Simona de Silvestro achieved her best finish in a Supercars race, finishing tenth in the Saturday race.

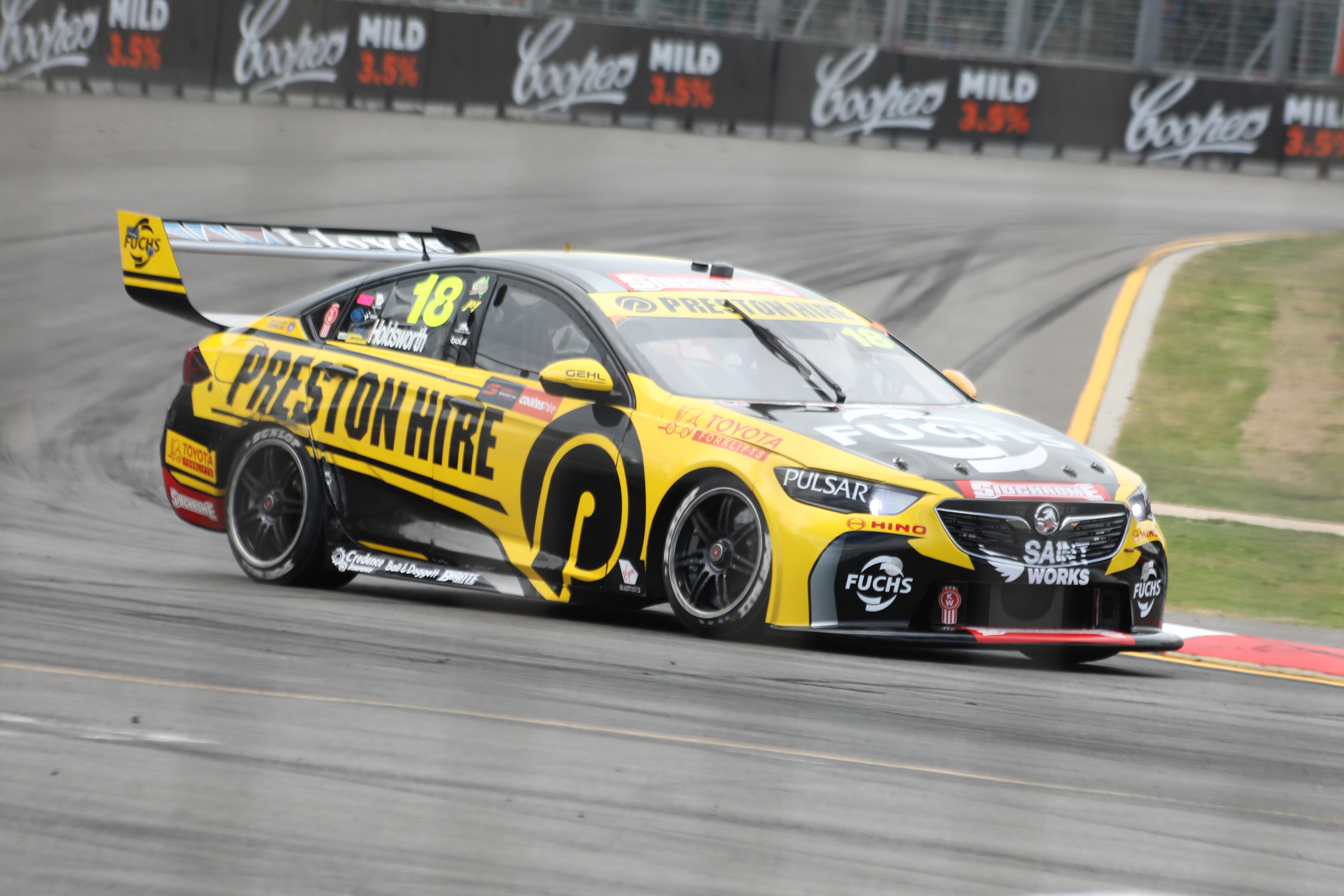
Lee Holdsworth briefly took the lead in the 50th lap in the Saturday race, before finishing twelfth.

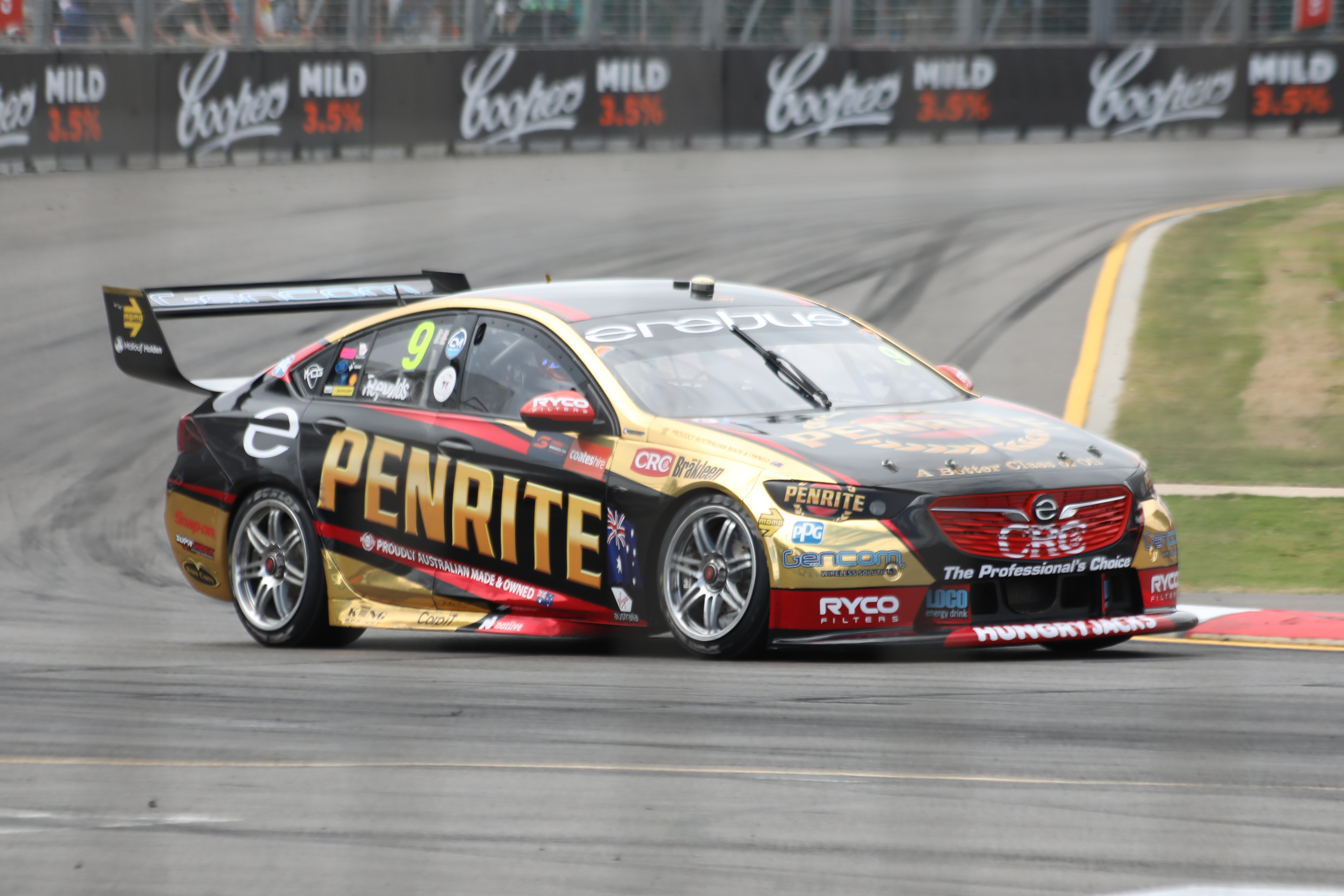
David Reynolds won the Sunday race.

Race

| Pos | No. | Driver | Team | Car | Laps | Time / Retired | Grid | Points |
|---|---|---|---|---|---|---|---|---|
| 1 | 17 | (New Zealand) Scott McLaughlin | DJR Team Penske | Ford Falcon FG X | 95 | 2:00:22.3235 | 3 | 150 |
| 2 | 9 | (Australia) David Reynolds | Erebus Motorsport | Holden Commodore ZB | 95 | +3.7704 | 7 | 138 |
| 3 | 1 | (Australia) Jamie Whincup | Triple Eight Race Engineering | Holden Commodore ZB | 95 | +10.7763 | 2 | 129 |
| 4 | 2 | (Australia) Scott Pye | Walkinshaw Andretti United | Holden Commodore ZB | 95 | +20.2576 | 12 | 120 |
| 5 | 97 | (New Zealand) Shane van Gisbergen | Triple Eight Race Engineering | Holden Commodore ZB | 95 | +22.4759^{1} | 1 | 111 |
| 6 | 5 | (Australia) Mark Winterbottom | Tickford Racing | Ford Falcon FG X | 95 | +40.4773 | 22 | 102 |
| 7 | 25 | (Australia) James Courtney | Walkinshaw Andretti United | Holden Commodore ZB | 95 | +41.7520 | 8 | 96 |
| 8 | 7 | (New Zealand) Andre Heimgartner | Nissan Motorsport | Nissan Altima L33 | 95 | +49.9266 | 26 | 90 |
| 9 | 15 | (Australia) Rick Kelly | Nissan Motorsport | Nissan Altima L33 | 95 | +52.1058 | 11 | 84 |
| 10 | 78 | (Switzerland) Simona de Silvestro | Nissan Motorsport | Nissan Altima L33 | 95 | +54.1625 | 18 | 78 |
| 11 | 99 | (Australia) Anton de Pasquale | Erebus Motorsport | Holden Commodore ZB | 95 | +56.5422 | 6 | 72 |
| 12 | 18 | (Australia) Lee Holdsworth | Team 18 | Holden Commodore ZB | 95 | +58.8959 | 5 | 69 |
| 13 | 35 | (Australia) Todd Hazelwood | Matt Stone Racing | Holden Commodore VF | 95 | +1:03.2275 | 17 | 66 |
| 14 | 100 | (Australia) Cam Waters | Tickford Racing | Ford Falcon FG X | 95 | +1:06.2744^{2} | 19 | 63 |
| 15 | 23 | (Australia) Michael Caruso | Nissan Motorsport | Nissan Altima L33 | 95 | +1:07.5099 | 20 | 60 |
| 16 | 230 | (Australia) Will Davison | 23Red Racing | Ford Falcon FG X | 94 | +1 Lap | 24 | 57 |
| 17 | 56 | (New Zealand) Richie Stanaway | Tickford Racing | Ford Falcon FG X | 94 | +1 Lap | 25 | 54 |
| 18 | 14 | (Australia) Tim Slade | Brad Jones Racing | Holden Commodore ZB | 94 | +1 Lap | 14 | 51 |
| 19 | 19 | (Australia) Jack Le Brocq | Tekno Autosports | Holden Commodore ZB | 93 | +2 Laps | 15 | 48 |
| 20 | 34 | (Australia) James Golding | Garry Rogers Motorsport | Holden Commodore ZB | 91 | +4 Laps | 21 | 45 |
| 21 | 55 | (Australia) Chaz Mostert | Tickford Racing | Ford Falcon FG X | 90 | +5 Laps | 16 | 42 |
| 22 | 33 | (Australia) Garth Tander | Garry Rogers Motorsport | Holden Commodore ZB | 90 | +5 Laps | 23 | 39 |
| 23 | 888 | (Australia) Craig Lowndes | Triple Eight Race Engineering | Holden Commodore ZB | 88 | +7 Laps | 9 | 36 |
| NC | 8 | (Australia) Nick Percat | Brad Jones Racing | Holden Commodore ZB | 42 | Accident Damage | 10 | |
| NC | 12 | (New Zealand) Fabian Coulthard | DJR Team Penske | Ford Falcon FG X | 41 | Accident | 4 | |
| NC | 21 | (Australia) Tim Blanchard | Tim Blanchard Racing | Holden Commodore ZB | 41 | Accident | 13 | |

- ^1 Van Gisbergen received a 25 second post-race penalty for a pit-lane infringement.
- ^2 Waters received a 15 second post-race penalty for a driving infringement.

=== Race 31 ===
Race

| Pos | No. | Driver | Team | Car | Laps | Time / Retired | Grid | Points |
|---|---|---|---|---|---|---|---|---|
| 1 | 9 | (Australia) David Reynolds | Erebus Motorsport | Holden Commodore ZB | 95 | 1:57:05.1149 | 1 | 150 |
| 2 | 17 | (New Zealand) Scott McLaughlin | DJR Team Penske | Ford Falcon FG X | 95 | +4.6807 | 2 | 138 |
| 3 | 1 | (Australia) Jamie Whincup | Triple Eight Race Engineering | Holden Commodore ZB | 95 | +17.1588 | 7 | 129 |
| 4 | 97 | (New Zealand) Shane van Gisbergen | Triple Eight Race Engineering | Holden Commodore ZB | 95 | +42.8390 | 3 | 120 |
| 5 | 25 | (Australia) James Courtney | Walkinshaw Andretti United | Holden Commodore ZB | 95 | +44.3857 | 6 | 111 |
| 6 | 7 | (New Zealand) Andre Heimgartner | Nissan Motorsport | Nissan Altima L33 | 95 | +45.2094 | 9 | 102 |
| 7 | 55 | (Australia) Chaz Mostert | Tickford Racing | Ford Falcon FG X | 95 | +45.4244 | 14 | 96 |
| 8 | 33 | (Australia) Garth Tander | Garry Rogers Motorsport | Holden Commodore ZB | 95 | +46.7038 | 4 | 90 |
| 9 | 18 | (Australia) Lee Holdsworth | Team 18 | Holden Commodore ZB | 95 | +47.1698 | 5 | 84 |
| 10 | 2 | (Australia) Scott Pye | Walkinshaw Andretti United | Holden Commodore ZB | 95 | +48.5032 | 23 | 78 |
| 11 | 888 | (Australia) Craig Lowndes | Triple Eight Race Engineering | Holden Commodore ZB | 95 | +49.8931 | 12 | 72 |
| 12 | 8 | (Australia) Nick Percat | Brad Jones Racing | Holden Commodore ZB | 95 | +56.5347 | 13 | 69 |
| 13 | 5 | (Australia) Mark Winterbottom | Tickford Racing | Ford Falcon FG X | 95 | +1:08.2384 | 18 | 66 |
| 14 | 100 | (Australia) Cam Waters | Tickford Racing | Ford Falcon FG X | 94 | +1 Lap | 11 | 63 |
| 15 | 14 | (Australia) Tim Slade | Brad Jones Racing | Holden Commodore ZB | 94 | +1 Lap | 8 | 60 |
| 16 | 99 | (Australia) Anton de Pasquale | Erebus Motorsport | Holden Commodore ZB | 94 | +1 Lap | 15 | 57 |
| 17 | 15 | (Australia) Rick Kelly | Nissan Motorsport | Nissan Altima L33 | 94 | +1 Lap | 16 | 54 |
| 18 | 19 | (Australia) Jack Le Brocq | Tekno Autosports | Holden Commodore ZB | 94 | +1 Lap | 20 | 51 |
| 19 | 23 | (Australia) Michael Caruso | Nissan Motorsport | Nissan Altima L33 | 94 | +1 Lap | 24 | 48 |
| 20 | 230 | (Australia) Will Davison | 23Red Racing | Ford Falcon FG X | 94 | +1 Lap | 17 | 45 |
| 21 | 35 | (Australia) Todd Hazelwood | Matt Stone Racing | Holden Commodore VF | 94 | +1 Lap | 25 | 42 |
| 22 | 21 | (Australia) Tim Blanchard | Tim Blanchard Racing | Holden Commodore ZB | 94 | +1 Lap | 19 | 39 |
| 23 | 56 | (New Zealand) Richie Stanaway | Tickford Racing | Ford Falcon FG X | 94 | +1 Lap | 26 | 36 |
| 24 | 78 | (Switzerland) Simona de Silvestro | Nissan Motorsport | Nissan Altima L33 | 94 | +1 Lap | 22 | 33 |
| 25 | 34 | (Australia) James Golding | Garry Rogers Motorsport | Holden Commodore ZB | 87 | +8 Laps | 21 | 30 |
| 26 | 12 | (New Zealand) Fabian Coulthard | DJR Team Penske | Ford Falcon FG X | 75 | +20 Laps | 10 | 27 |
