= 2015 Ipswich Super Sprint =

2015 V8 Supercar championship race

(Queensland) 2015 Coates Hire Ipswich Super Sprint
Event Information
- Round 7 of 14 in the 2015 International V8 Supercars Championship
- Date: 31 July–2 August 2015
- Location: Ipswich, Queensland
- Venue: Queensland Raceway
- Weather: Fine

Results
Race 1
Distance	20 laps	60 km
Pole position	Chaz Mostert; Prodrive Racing Australia	1:09.7755
Winner	Mark Winterbottom; Prodrive Racing Australia	23:51.2845
Race 2
Distance	20 laps	60 km
Pole position	Craig Lowndes; Triple Eight Race Engineering	1:09.3102
Winner	Mark Winterbottom; Prodrive Racing Australia	25:20.0059
Race 3
Distance	65 laps	200 km
Pole position	Chaz Mostert; Prodrive Racing Australia	1:09.7326
Winner	Chaz Mostert; Prodrive Racing Australia	1:19:14.8200

The 2015 Coates Hire Ipswich Super Sprint was a motor race for V8 Supercars held on the weekend of 31 July – 2 August 2015. The event was held at the Queensland Raceway in Ipswich, Queensland, and consisted of two sprint races, each over a distance of 60 kilometres (37 miles) and one endurance race over a distance of 200 kilometres (124 miles). It was the seventh round of fourteen in the 2015 International V8 Supercars Championship.

== Race results ==
=== Qualifying - Race 18 ===
Pos.	No.	Driver	Car	Team	Time
1	6	(Australia) Chaz Mostert	Ford FG X Falcon	Prodrive Racing Australia	1:09.7755
2	5	(Australia) Mark Winterbottom	Ford FG X Falcon	Prodrive Racing Australia	1:10.0234
3	111	(New Zealand) Andre Heimgartner	Ford FG X Falcon	Super Black Racing	1:10.0367
4	33	(New Zealand) Scott McLaughlin	Volvo S60	Garry Rogers Motorsport	1:10.0578
5	888	(Australia) Craig Lowndes	Holden VF Commodore	Triple Eight Race Engineering	1:10.0755
6	97	(New Zealand) Shane van Gisbergen	Holden VF Commodore	Tekno Autosports	1:10.1366
7	22	(Australia) James Courtney	Holden VF Commodore	Holden Racing Team	1:10.1680
8	17	(Australia) Scott Pye	Ford FG X Falcon	DJR Team Penske	1:10.1787
9	55	(Australia) David Reynolds	Ford FG X Falcon	Rod Nash Racing	1:10.1791
10	1	(Australia) Jamie Whincup	Holden VF Commodore	Triple Eight Race Engineering	1:10.1827
11	47	(Australia) Tim Slade	Holden VF Commodore	Walkinshaw Racing	1:10.1967
12	4	(Australia) Ash Walsh	Mercedes-Benz E63 AMG	Erebus Motorsport	1:10.2024
13	9	(Australia) Will Davison	Mercedes-Benz E63 AMG	Erebus Motorsport	1:10.2276
14	14	(New Zealand) Fabian Coulthard	Holden VF Commodore	Brad Jones Racing	1:10.2578
15	2	(Australia) Garth Tander	Holden VF Commodore	Holden Racing Team	1:10.2620
16	222	(Australia) Nick Percat	Holden VF Commodore	Lucas Dumbrell Motorsport	1:10.2668
17	23	(Australia) Michael Caruso	Nissan Altima L33	Nissan Motorsport	1:10.3003
18	15	(Australia) Rick Kelly	Nissan Altima L33	Nissan Motorsport	1:10.3556
19	18	(Australia) Lee Holdsworth	Holden VF Commodore	Charlie Schwerkolt Racing	1:10.3973
20	21	(Australia) Dale Wood	Holden VF Commodore	Britek Motorsport	1:10.5132
21	7	(Australia) Todd Kelly	Nissan Altima L33	Nissan Motorsport	1:10.6476
22	34	(Australia) David Wall	Volvo S60	Garry Rogers Motorsport	1:10.6883
23	3	(Australia) Tim Blanchard	Holden VF Commodore	Lucas Dumbrell Motorsport	1:10.8865
24	8	(Australia) Jason Bright	Holden VF Commodore	Brad Jones Racing	1:11.1473
EXC	99	(Australia) James Moffat	Nissan Altima L33	Nissan Motorsport	Excluded

=== Qualifying - Race 19 ===
Pos.	No.	Driver	Car	Team	Time
1	888	(Australia) Craig Lowndes	Holden VF Commodore	Triple Eight Race Engineering	1:09.3102
2	5	(Australia) Mark Winterbottom	Ford FG X Falcon	Prodrive Racing Australia	1:09.3229
3	6	(Australia) Chaz Mostert	Ford FG X Falcon	Prodrive Racing Australia	1:09.3308
4	33	(New Zealand) Scott McLaughlin	Volvo S60	Garry Rogers Motorsport	1:09.3510
5	7	(Australia) Todd Kelly	Nissan Altima L33	Nissan Motorsport	1:09.4155
6	55	(Australia) David Reynolds	Ford FG X Falcon	Rod Nash Racing	1:09.4319
7	4	(Australia) Ash Walsh	Mercedes-Benz E63 AMG	Erebus Motorsport	1:09.4657
8	1	(Australia) Jamie Whincup	Holden VF Commodore	Triple Eight Race Engineering	1:09.4863
9	9	(Australia) Will Davison	Mercedes-Benz E63 AMG	Erebus Motorsport	1:09.4888
10	111	(New Zealand) Andre Heimgartner	Ford FG X Falcon	Super Black Racing	1:09.5517
11	17	(Australia) Scott Pye	Ford FG X Falcon	DJR Team Penske	1:09.5542
12	22	(Australia) James Courtney	Holden VF Commodore	Holden Racing Team	1:09.5837
13	23	(Australia) Michael Caruso	Nissan Altima L33	Nissan Motorsport	1:09.6419
14	2	(Australia) Garth Tander	Holden VF Commodore	Holden Racing Team	1:09.6559
15	15	(Australia) Rick Kelly	Nissan Altima L33	Nissan Motorsport	1:09.6623
16	47	(Australia) Tim Slade	Holden VF Commodore	Walkinshaw Racing	1:09.7158
17	8	(Australia) Jason Bright	Holden VF Commodore	Brad Jones Racing	1:09.7256
18	18	(Australia) Lee Holdsworth	Holden VF Commodore	Charlie Schwerkolt Racing	1:09.7418
19	222	(Australia) Nick Percat	Holden VF Commodore	Lucas Dumbrell Motorsport	1:09.7512
20	14	(New Zealand) Fabian Coulthard	Holden VF Commodore	Brad Jones Racing	1:09.7807
21	97	(New Zealand) Shane van Gisbergen	Holden VF Commodore	Tekno Autosports	1:09.7980
22	3	(Australia) Tim Blanchard	Holden VF Commodore	Lucas Dumbrell Motorsport	1:09.8835
23	34	(Australia) David Wall	Volvo S60	Garry Rogers Motorsport	1:09.8984
24	21	(Australia) Dale Wood	Holden VF Commodore	Britek Motorsport	1:10.0711
EXC	99	(Australia) James Moffat	Nissan Altima L33	Nissan Motorsport	Excluded
