= Ford Falcon (FG X) =

Australian full-size car

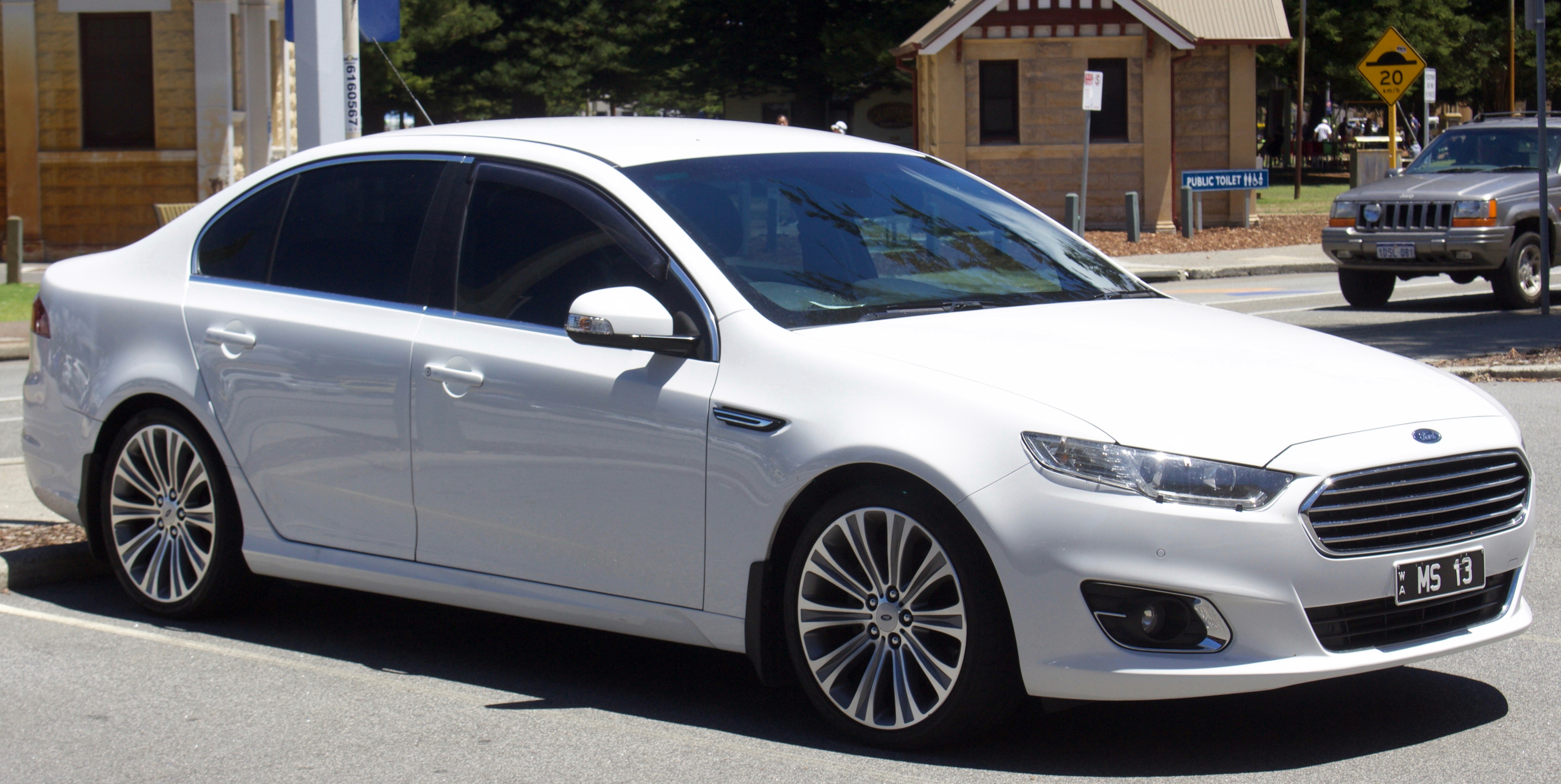
- Ford Falcon G6E Turbo sedan

Overview
- Manufacturer: Ford Australia
- Production: October 2014 – October 2016
- Assembly: Australia: Melbourne, Victoria (Broadmeadows)
- Designer: Jordan Demkiw

Body and chassis
- Class: Full-size car (E)
- Body style: 4-door sedan 2-door coupé utility 2-door cab chassis utility
- Layout: FR layout

Powertrain
- Engine: Inline-four: 2.0 L Ecoboost; Straight-six: 4.0 L Barra 195; 4.0 L Barra EcoLPi; 4.0 L Barra 270T; 4.0 L Barra 325T; V8: 5.0 L Miami supercharged V8
- Transmission: 6-speed 6HP 21 automatic (I4, I6); 6-speed 6HP 26 automatic (I6-T, V8); 6-speed TR-6060 manual

Chronology
- Predecessor: Ford Falcon (FG)
- Successor: Ford Mondeo (fourth generation); Ford Mustang (sixth generation); Ford Ranger (first generation)

The Ford Falcon (FG X) is a full-size car that was produced by Ford Australia. Introduced in 2014, it is a restyled second and final iteration of the seventh generation Falcon. While external and drive train changes were significant, the interior was carried over from the 2008-2014 FG model. This was the last locally produced model by Ford Australia.

== Naming ==
Internally known as project 201X, Ford Australia revealed its last Falcon in August 2014 and explained that its series code, "FG X", was chosen following significant feedback from key enthusiasts. The new code, like the preceding FG, pays homage to the Fairmont Ghia nameplates of past generations whereas the X alludes to Falcon's most popular series, from the XK to the XF.

== Model range ==
The FG X was officially launched in December 2014 and was offered in both sedan and utility body styles.

The sedan is sold in eight variants comprising:

- Falcon
- Falcon G6E
- Falcon G6E Turbo
- Falcon XR6
- Falcon XR6 Turbo
- Falcon XR6 Sprint
- Falcon XR8
- Falcon XR8 Sprint

The latter nameplate returned after being absent from the Falcon range since June 2010. In this final iteration, the XR8 is based on a FPV drivetrain, which includes the locally developed "Miami" variant of the Coyote supercharged 5.0-litre V8 engine producing 335 kW (449 hp) and 570 N⋅m (420 lb⋅ft) of torque. All XR variants (with the exception of the XR6 Sprint which was available with the ZF 26HP Auto only) have the option of manual or automatic transmissions, while the Falcon and G6E/G6ET were sold with a 6 speed automatic transmission only.

The utility range included the base Ute (replacing the previous XL), XR6 and XR6 Turbo only—each with the option of cab chassis or utility (style side box) bodies. The Falcon utility ended production on 29 July 2016.

The G6, which was introduced with the FG series in 2008 to replace the Fairmont badge, was discontinued and, unlike past series, the XR8 sedan was not complemented by a utility version.

This Falcon range is the first Australian-made vehicle to feature Wi-Fi connectivity and DAB+ radio courtesy of its upgraded in-car entertainment and command system, now marketed as "SYNC2". The system also features voice control and emergency call functionality.

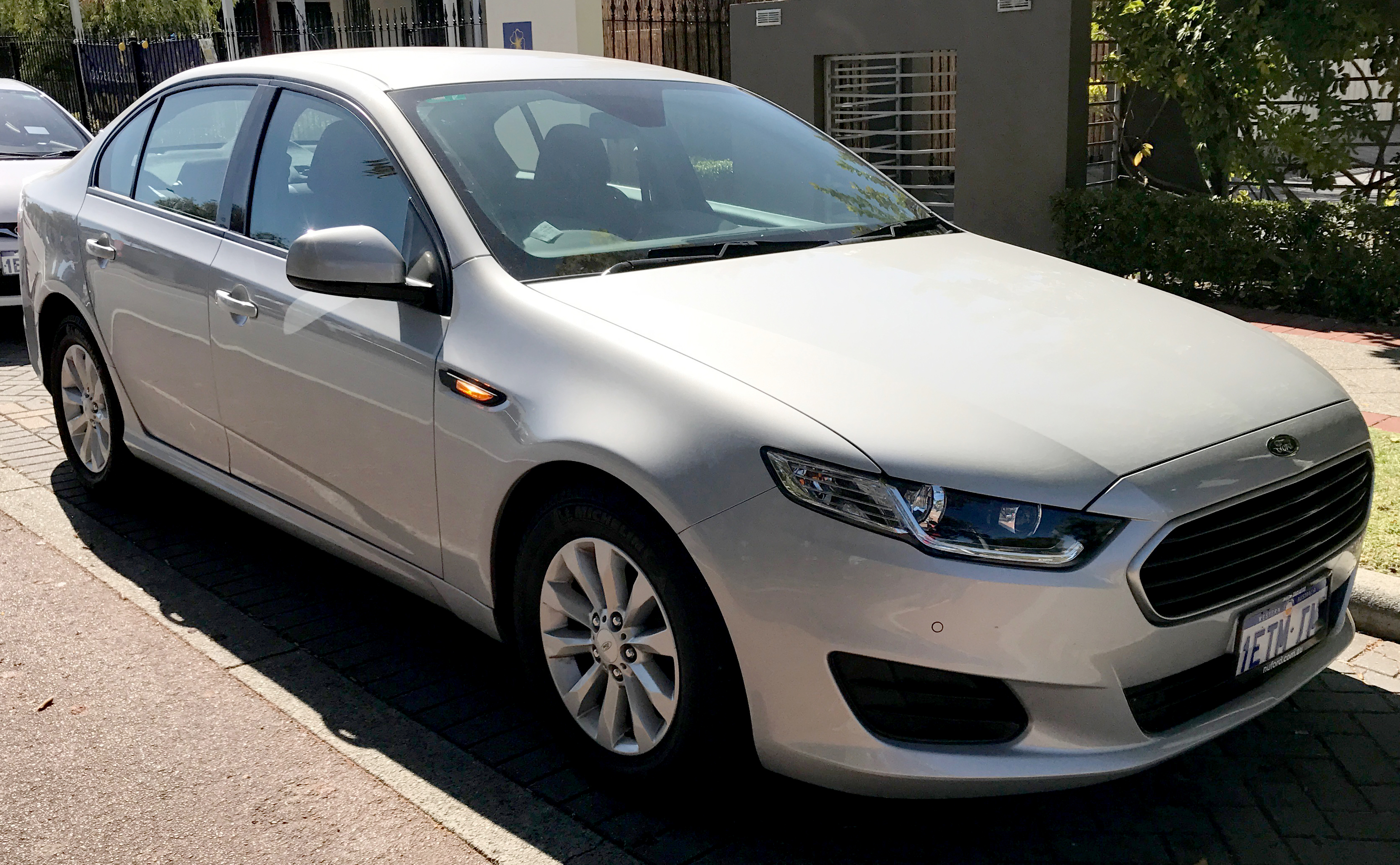
Ford Falcon

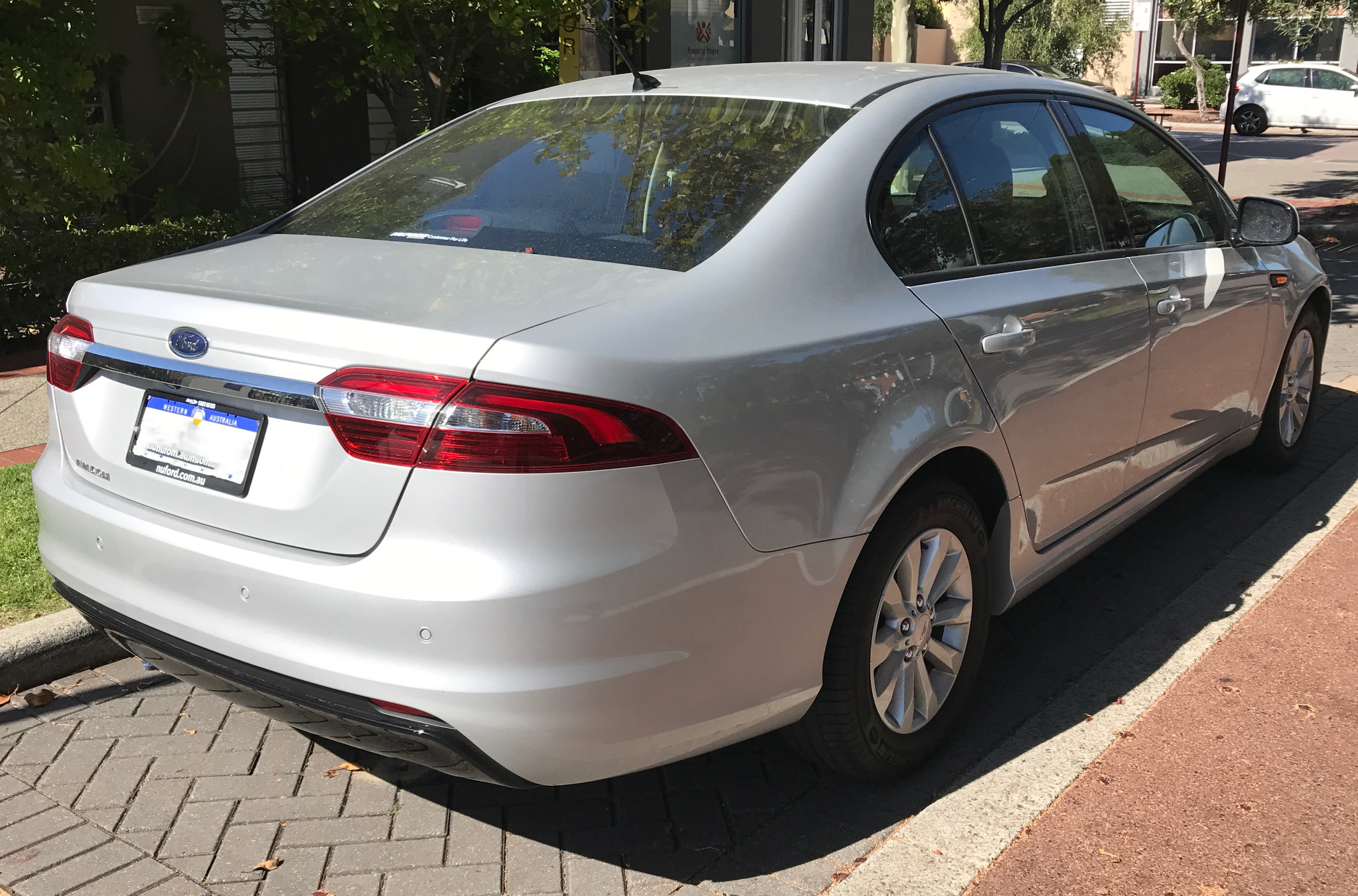
Ford Falcon

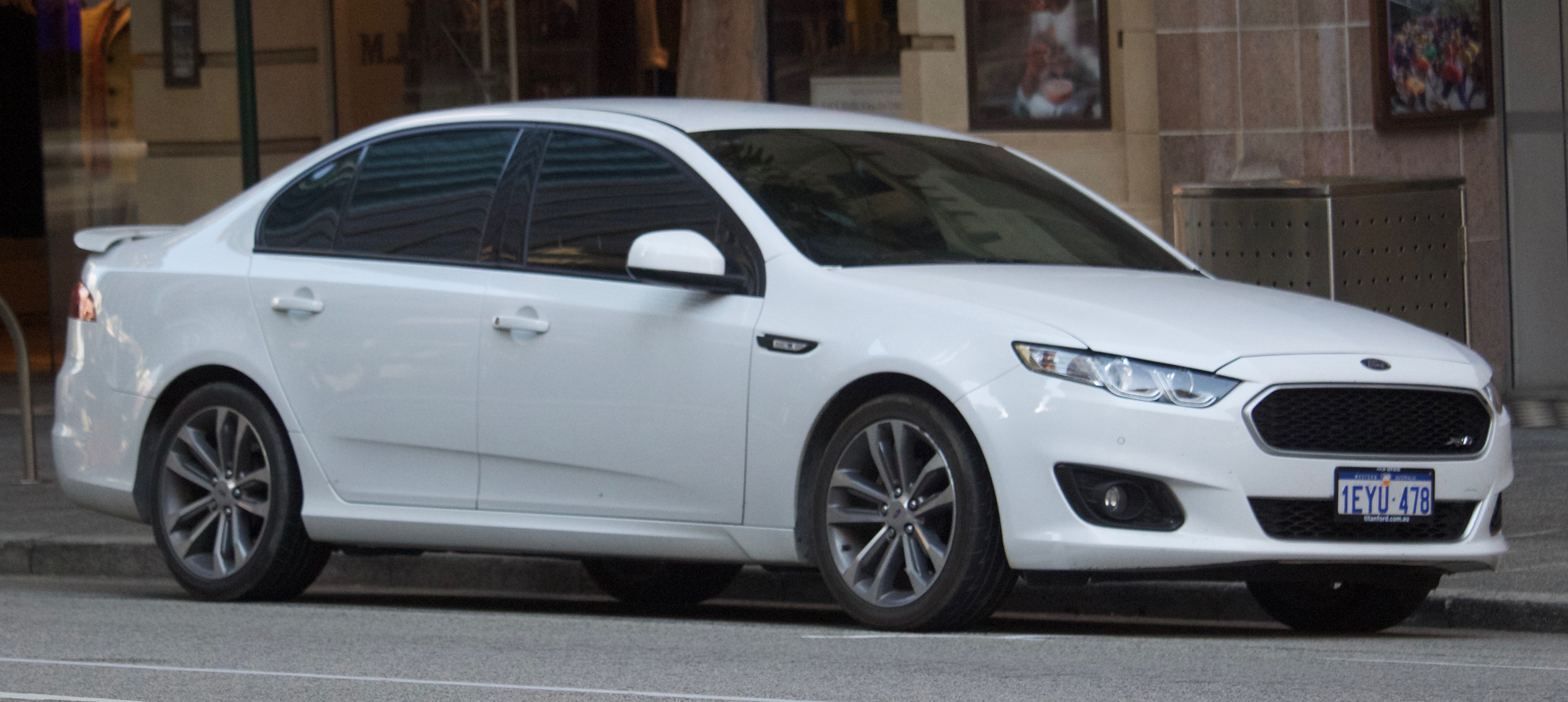
Ford Falcon XR6

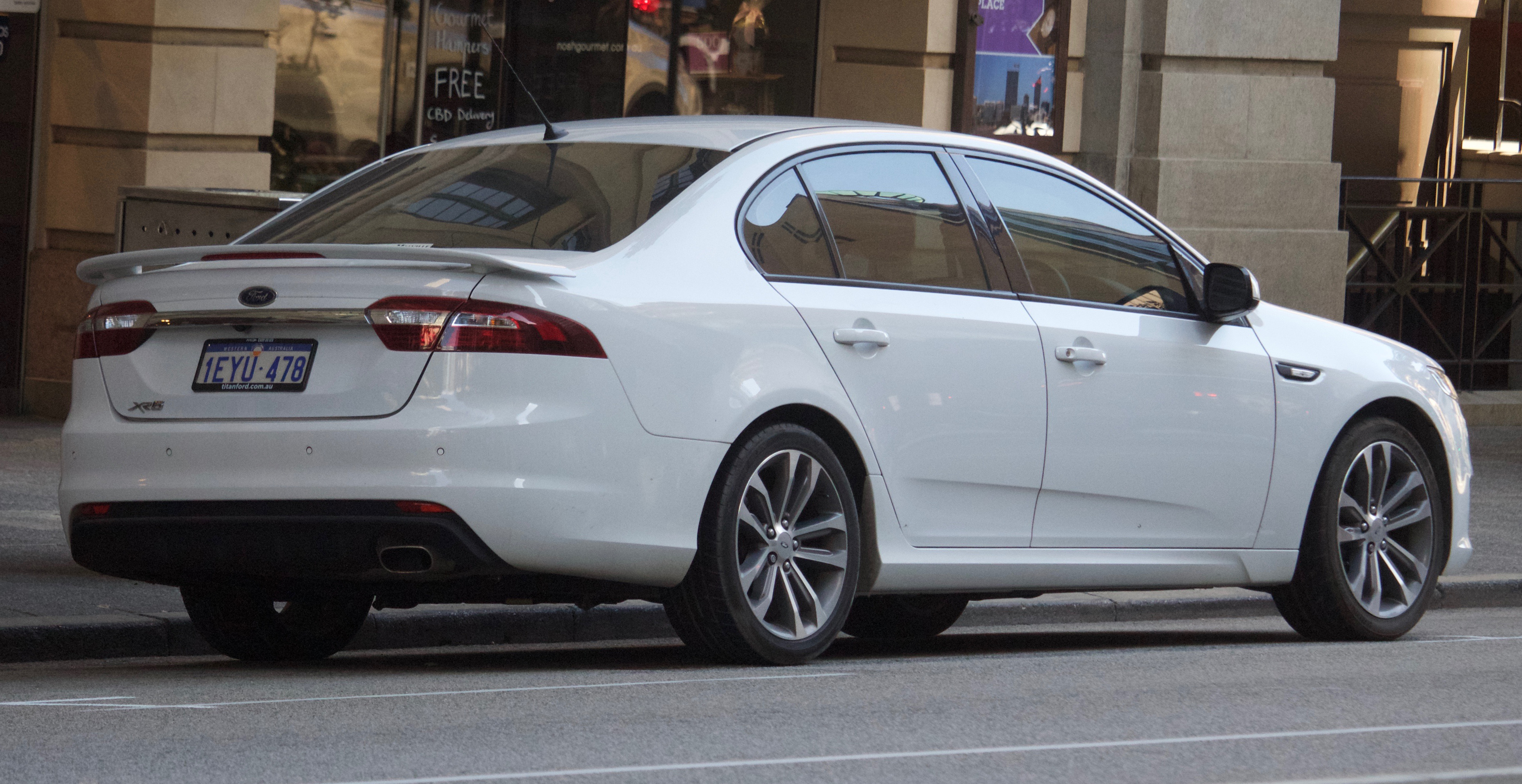
Ford Falcon XR6

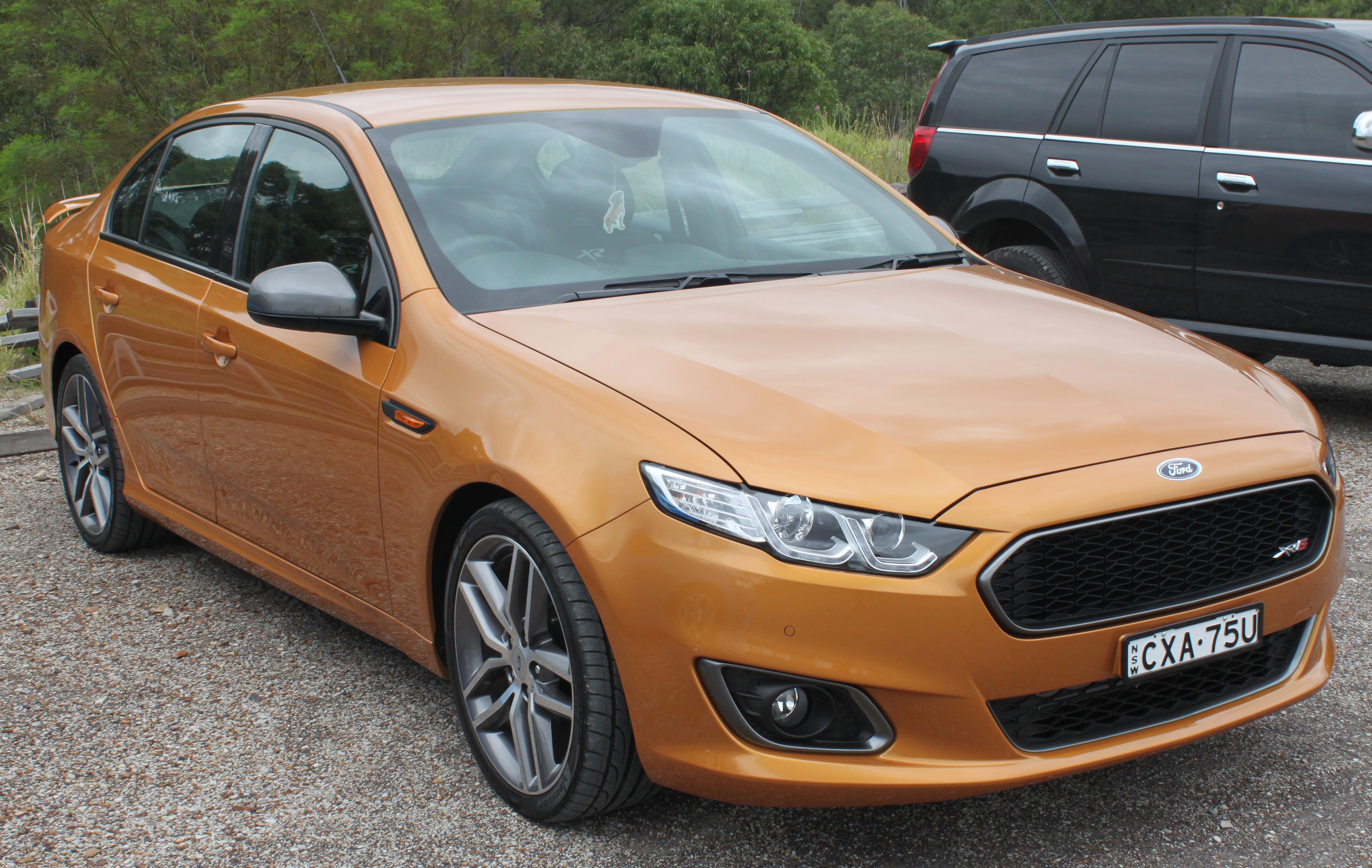
Ford Falcon XR6 Turbo

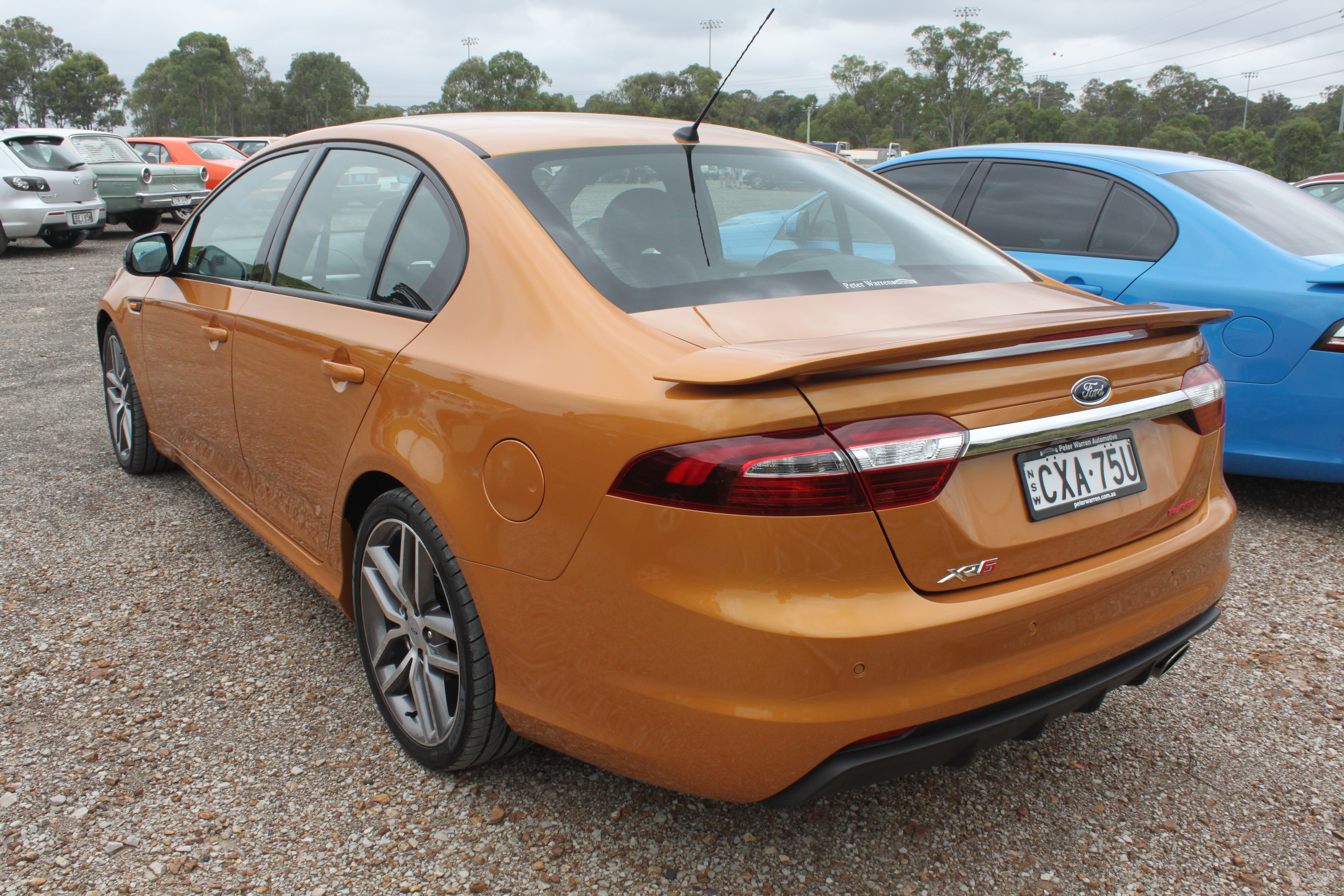
Ford Falcon XR6 Turbo

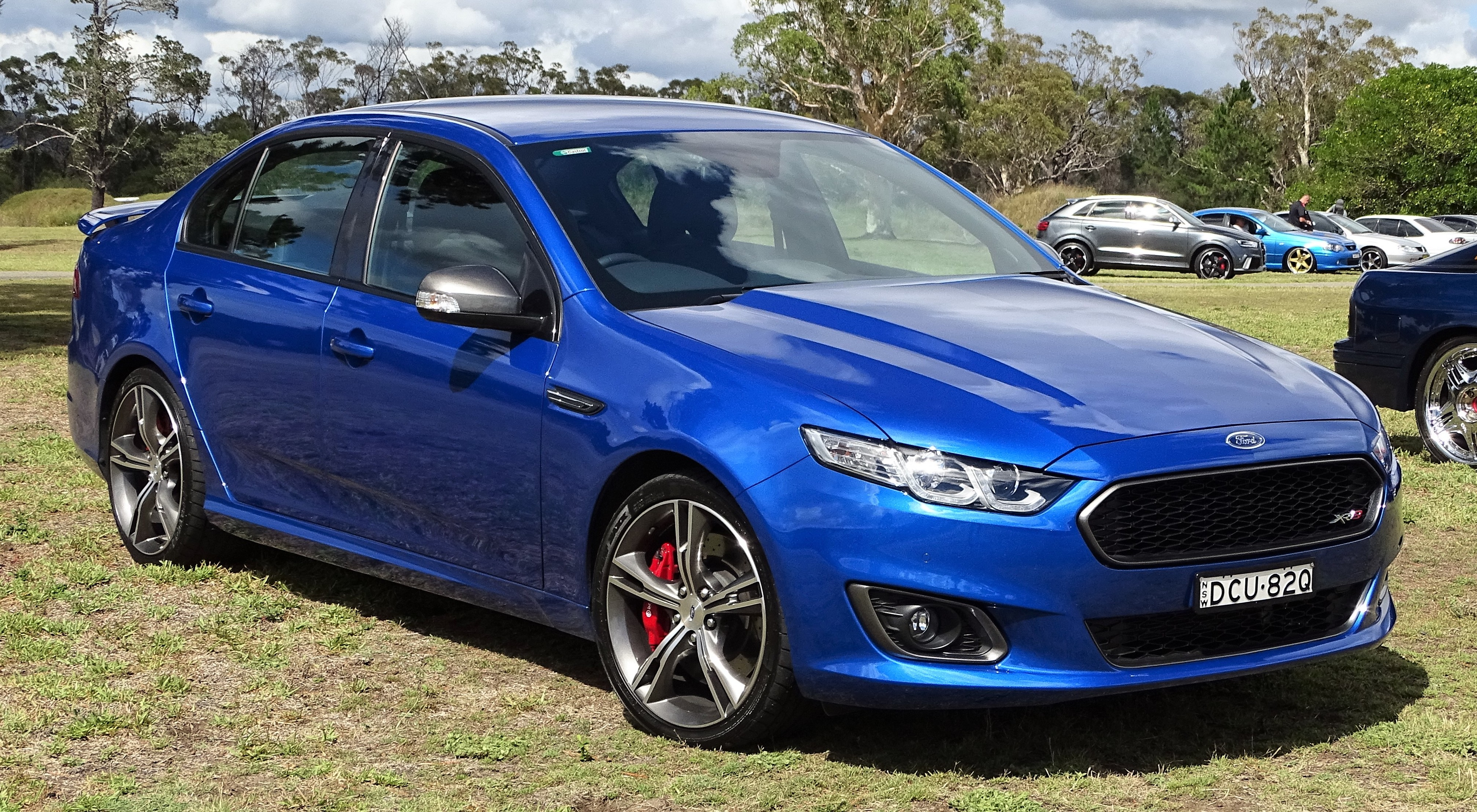
Ford Falcon XR8

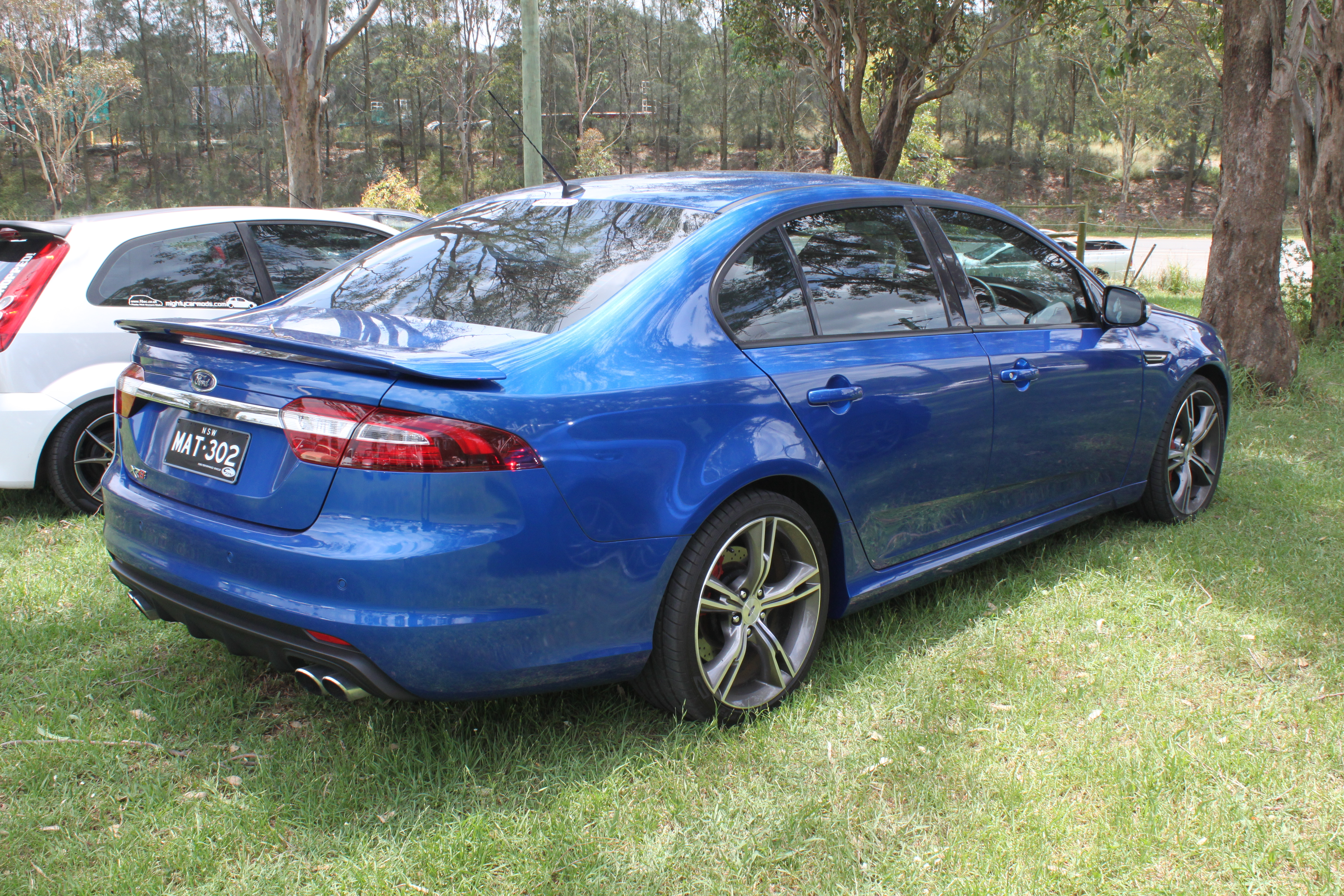
Ford Falcon XR8

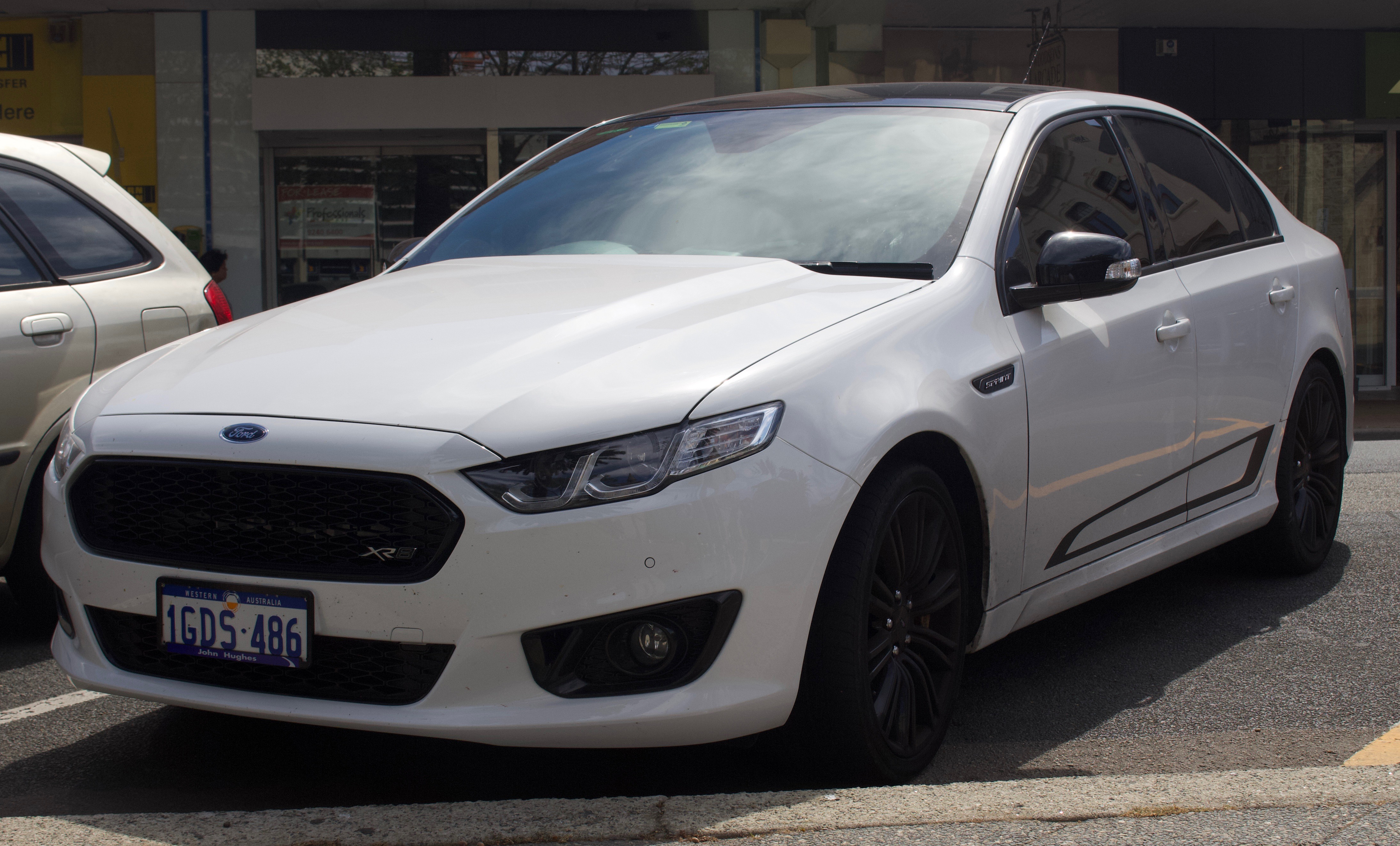
Ford Falcon XR8 Sprint

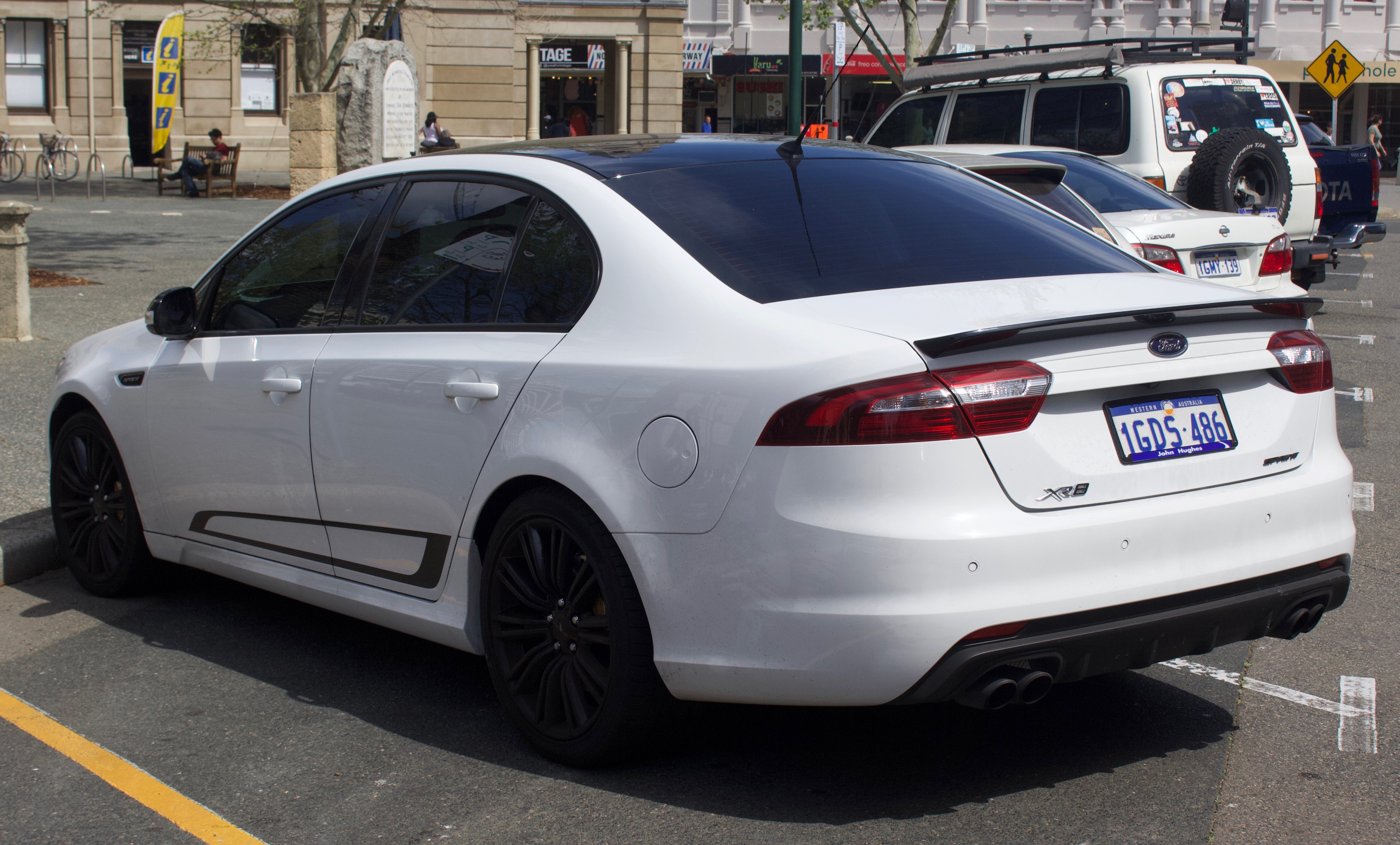
Ford Falcon XR8 Sprint

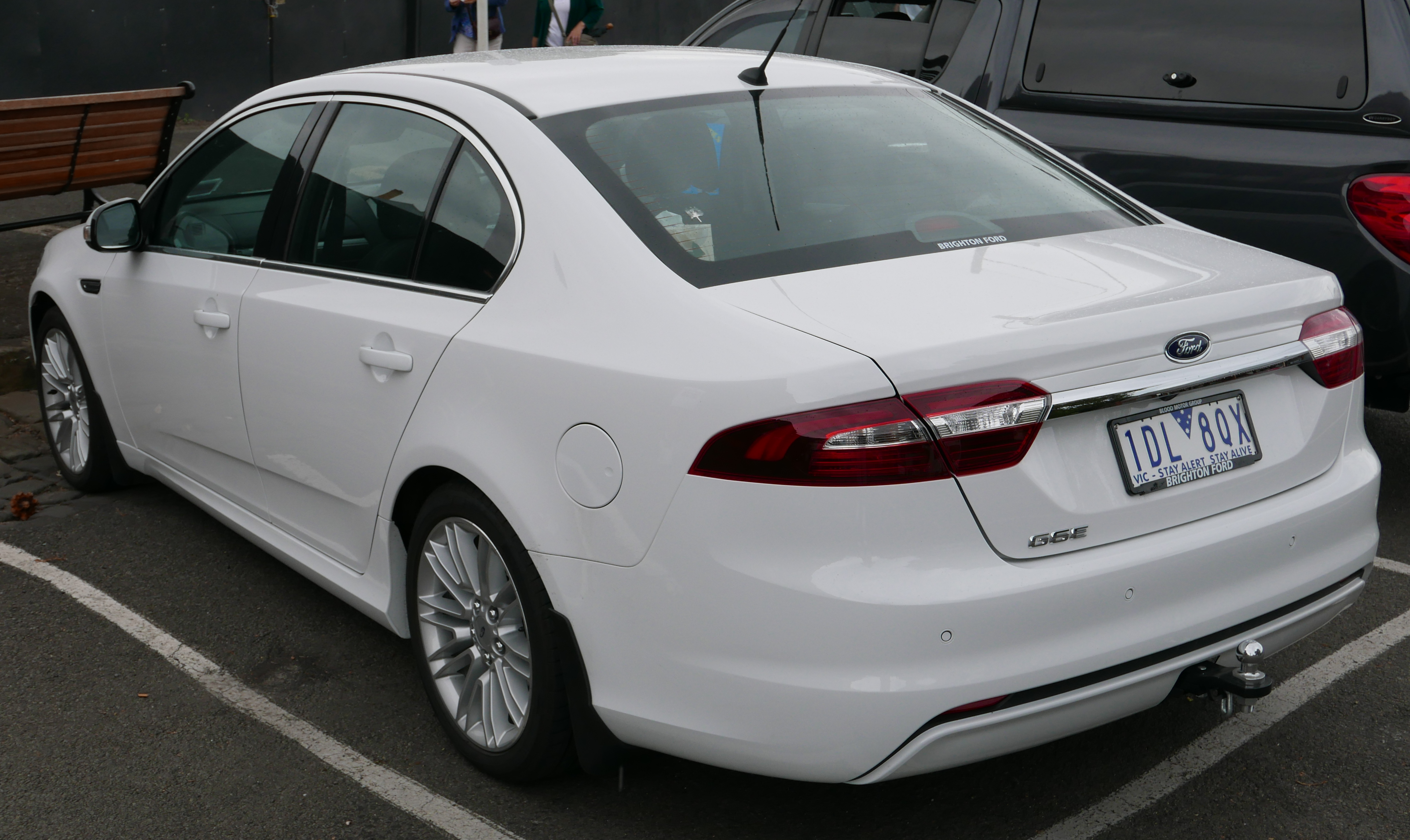
Ford Falcon G6E

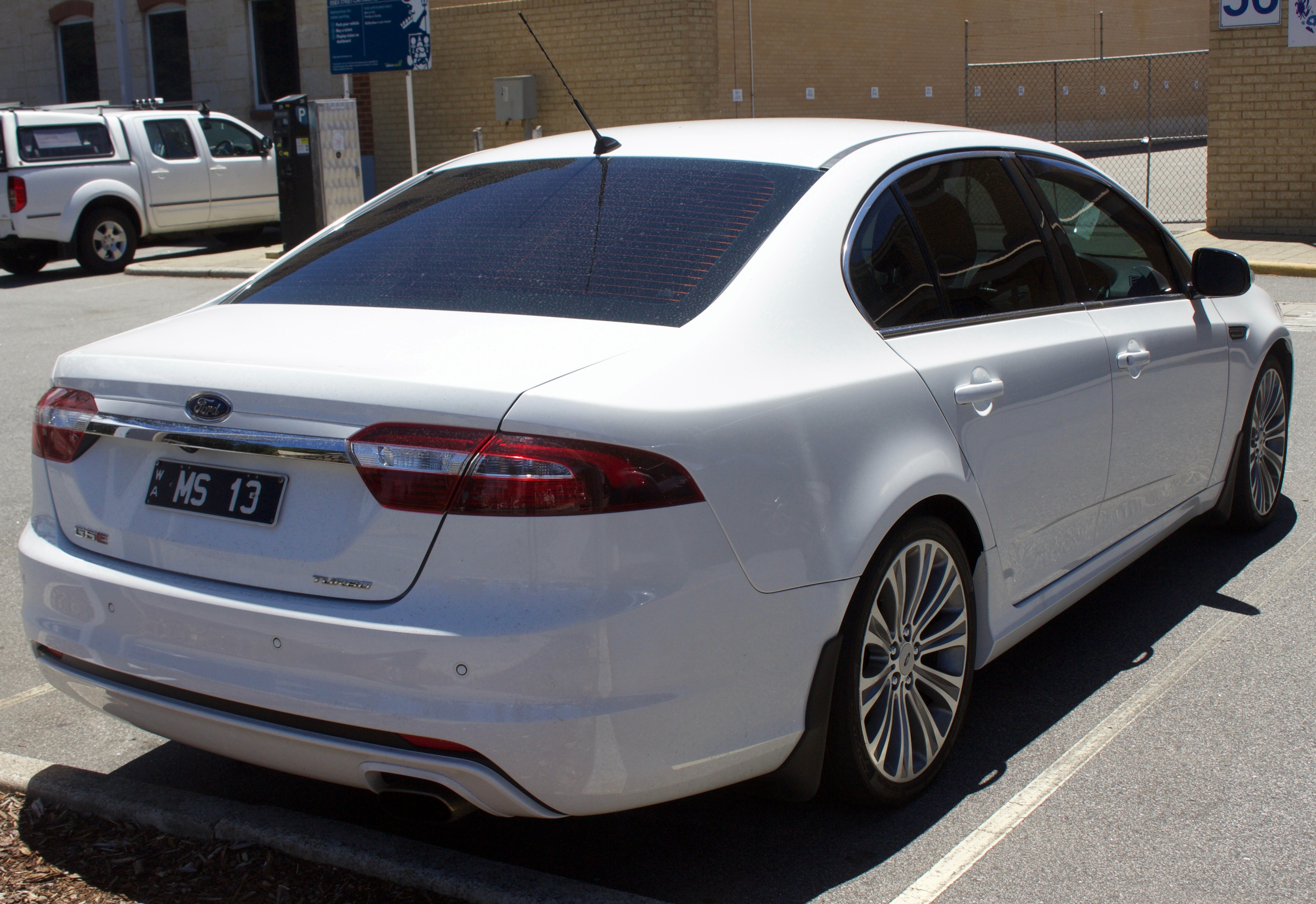
Ford Falcon G6E Turbo

== Engines ==
The Ford Falcon FG X is available with the following engines:

- 2.0-litre inline-four turbocharged: 180 kW (240 hp)
- 4.0-litre inline-six: 195 kW (261 hp)
- 4.0-litre inline-six lpg (EcoLPI): 198 kW (266 hp)
- 4.0-litre inline-six turbocharged: 270 kW (360 hp) or 325 kW (436 hp) for the Sprint model
- 5.0-litre V8 supercharged: 335 kW (449 hp) or 345 kW (463 hp) for the Sprint model

Powertrains
Engine	Power	Torque	Transmission	
Engine	Power	Torque	Manual	Automatic
2.0 L EcoBoost I4 (petrol)	176 kW (236 hp)	353 N⋅m (260 lb⋅ft)		6-speed 6HP 21 automatic
4.0 L Barra 195 I6 (petrol)	195 kW (261 hp)	391 N⋅m (288 lb⋅ft)	6-speed TR-6060 manual	6-speed 6HP 21 automatic
4.0 L Barra EcoLPi I6 (LPG)	198 kW (266 hp)	409 N⋅m (302 lb⋅ft)		6-speed 6HP 21 automatic
4.0 L Barra 270T I6 Turbo (petrol)	270 kW (360 hp)	533 N⋅m (393 lb⋅ft)	6-speed TR-6060 manual	6-speed 6HP 26 automatic
4.0 L Barra 325T I6 Turbo (petrol)	325 kW (436 hp)	576 N⋅m (425 lb⋅ft)	6-speed TR-6060 manual	6-speed 6HP 26 automatic
5.0 L Miami V8 Supercharged (petrol)	335 kW (449 hp)	570 N⋅m (420 lb⋅ft)	6-speed TR-6060 manual	6-speed 6HP 26 automatic
5.0 L Miami V8 Supercharged (petrol)	345 kW (463 hp)	575 N⋅m (424 lb⋅ft)	6-speed TR-6060 manual	6-speed 6HP 26 automatic

== Successor ==
Come October 2016, due to Ford's "One Ford" product development plan introduced in 2008 to rationalise its global range, the Falcon will not be directly replaced by a similarly sized vehicle, such as the much-speculated North American Taurus, due to an unsuccessful previous attempt to sell the third-generation model on the Australian market in the 1990s. Instead, Ford Australia will offer the fourth-generation Mondeo from Europe and the sixth-generation Mustang, the latter as part of Ford's efforts to boost sales of the Mustang brand worldwide and still give Ford Australia a halo car to replace the Falcon XR and Falcon GT V8 range.

The Ford Falcon was labeled as 'inextricably linked to Australian Heritage' by the former CEO of Ford Australia (Bob Graziano). Although Ford has sourced the Mustang and the Fusion/Mondeo, they have no plans to bring in a direct replacement for the Falcon. Ford retired the Falcon name on 7 October 2016 after 56 years of production, therefore, making it one of the longest running nameplates in the history of Ford, alongside the Mustang and F-series.

== Safety ==
ANCAP test results* Ford Falcon all sedan variants (2013)
Test	Score
Overall	5 /5 stars
Frontal offset	14.61/16
Side impact	16/16
Pole	2/2
Seat belt reminders	2/3
Whiplash protection	Good
Pedestrian protection	Marginal
Electronic stability control	Standard

ANCAP test results* Ford Falcon Ute all variants (2013)
Test	Score
Overall	5 /5 stars
Frontal offset	14.62/16
Side impact	15.96/16
Pole	2/2
Seat belt reminders	2/3
Whiplash protection	Good
Pedestrian protection	Marginal
Electronic stability control	Standard

== Sales ==
Sales of the FG X Falcon (and the SZ II Territory) commenced in December 2014. Sales exceeded 700 monthly sales vehicles for the first time in March 2015.

The FG X Falcon was produced from October 2014 until the end of Ford vehicle production in Australia in October 2016. During this time, it only sold a little over 11,100 units. Including Utility sales made throughout the same duration, this would bring the tally to approximately 16,100.

The six cylinder models were used briefly by police in Western Australia as a general policing vehicle.

	Year	Total
2014	578	11,166
2015	5,938	11,166
2016	4,434	11,166
2017	210	11,166
2018	60	11,166
