= 2021 Super2 Series =

Australian motor racing

Seasons
- ← 2020 (Super2); 2019 (Super3) 2022 →

The 2021 Super2 & Super3 Series was an Australian motor racing competition for Supercars, which is being staged as a support series to the 2021 Supercars Championship. It was the twenty-second running of the Supercars Development Series, the second tier of competition in Supercars racing. 2021 saw Super3 entries competing alongside Super2 Series cars as a class for the first time within the series which also marked at the same time as the fourteenth running of the Super3 Series itself (Formerly the Kumho Tyre V8 Touring Car Series before officially becoming a third-tier Supercars Series in 2019 as the Kumho Tyre Super3 Series).

Broc Feeney won the Super2 Series championship.

Matt McLean won the Rookie of Year and the Mike Kable Young Gun Award.

Nash Morris won the Super3 Series championship with a race to spare.

== Entries ==
=== Classes ===
Name	Regulation	Example Vehicles
Super2	2013 to 2017 V8 Supercars	Holden VF Commodore; Nissan Altima L33; Ford Falcon FG X Mercedes-Benz E63 W212
Super3	post 1993 V8 Supercars	Ford BA Falcon; Holden Commodore VE; Ford FG Falcon

=== Entries List ===
The following teams and drivers were competing in the 2021 series.

==== Super2 ====
Manufacturer	Model	Team	No.	Driver name	Rounds	Ref.
Ford	FG X Falcon	Matt Chahda Motorsport	18	(Australia) Matt Chahda	All	
Ford	FG X Falcon	Tickford Racing	78	(Australia) Zak Best	All	
Holden	Commodore VF	Triple Eight Race Engineering	10/6	(Australia) Angelo Mouzouris	All	
Holden	Commodore VF	Triple Eight Race Engineering	888	(Australia) Broc Feeney	All	
Holden	Commodore VF	Brema Group Racing	11	(Australia) Zane Morse	All	
Holden	Commodore VF	Eggleston Motorsport	22	(Australia) Bradley Neill	1	
Holden	Commodore VF	Eggleston Motorsport	38	(Australia) Jack Sipp	1–3	
Holden	Commodore VF	Eggleston Motorsport	38	(Australia) Tony D'Alberto	4	
Holden	Commodore VF	Eggleston Motorsport	38	(Australia) Josh Fife	5	
Holden	Commodore VF	Eggleston Motorsport	54	(Australia) Matt McLean	All	
Holden	Commodore VF	Eggleston Motorsport	88	(Australia) Tim Blanchard	2, 4–5	
Holden	Commodore VF	Eggleston Motorsport	88	(Australia) Jack Perkins	3	
Holden	Commodore VF	Matt Stone Racing	30	(Australia) Aaron Seton	All	
Holden	Commodore VF	Image Racing	49	(Australia) Jordan Boys	All	
Holden	Commodore VF	Image Racing	999	(Australia) Jaylyn Robotham	All	
Holden	Commodore VF	Mac Motorsport	69	(Australia) Jon McCorkindale	2–5	
Nissan	Altima L33	Grove Racing	10	(New Zealand) Matthew Payne	4–5	
Nissan	Altima L33	MW Motorsport	27	(Australia) Tyler Everingham	All	
Nissan	Altima L33	MW Motorsport	28	(Australia) Josh Fife	1–4	
Nissan	Altima L33	MW Motorsport	31	(Australia) Jayden Ojeda	All	
Nissan	Altima L33	MW Motorsport	777	(Australia) Declan Fraser	All	

==== Super3 ====
The category was open to post 1993 V8 Supercars allowing Ford Falcon EF to FG and Holden Commodore VP to VE2.

Manufacturer	Model	Team	No.	Driver name	Rounds	Ref.
Ford	BA Falcon	Ray Hislop	23	(Australia) Ray Hislop	1	
Ford	BF Falcon	Tony Auddino	4	(Australia) Tony Auddino	1	
Ford	BF Falcon	Jason Foley	17	(Australia) Jason Foley	1, 4–5	
Ford	FG Falcon	Anderson Motorsport	5	(Australia) Michael Anderson	All	
Ford	FG Falcon	North West Recycling	24	(Australia) David Murphy	2, 4	
Ford	FG Falcon	Matt Stone Racing	35	(Australia) Jason Gommersall	1–4	
Ford	FG Falcon	Matt Stone Racing	39	(Australia) Chris Smerdon	2–4	
Ford	FG Falcon	Image Racing	61	(Australia) Reef McCarthy	All	
Ford	FG Falcon	Nemo Racing (Note: Registered for Rounds two to four as 'Flash Bush Motorsport')	67	(Australia) Nash Morris	All	
Ford	FG Falcon	Mac Motorsport	69	(Australia) Jon McCorkindale	1	
Holden	Commodore VE	Eggleston Motorsport	2	(Australia) Steven Page	1–2, 4–5	
Holden	Commodore VE	Pollicina Motorsports	7	(Australia) Jim Pollicina	1, 4–5	
Holden	Commodore VE	Brad Jones Racing	8	(Australia) Elly Morrow	4–5	
Holden	Commodore VE	Strong Motorsport	75	(Australia) Brendan Strong	1–3	
Holden	Commodore VE	Blake Fardell Racing	77	(Australia) Blake Fardell	1–4	
Holden	Commodore VE	Gary Collins	96	(Australia) Gary Collins	2–4	

=== Team changes ===
- Triple Eight Race Engineering returned to running a two car operation after one year entering a single car.
- Matt Stone Racing returned to the category after a one-year absence.
- MW Motorsport scaled up to a four car operation after purchasing an ex-Kelly Racing Nissan Altima.

=== Driver changes ===
- Broc Feeney left Tickford Racing and joined Triple Eight Race Engineering.
- Zak Best left MW Motorsport to join Tickford Racing
- Aaron Seton, the son of former Supercars Champion Glenn Seton, joined the championship with Matt Stone Racing.
- Jaylyn Robotham graduated to the series with Image Racing to replace Will Brown who graduated to the Supercars Championship.
- Bradley Neill joined the championship with Eggleston Motorsport driving his own ex-Holden Racing Team VF Commodore.
- Tyler Everingham returned to MW Motorsport after one year with Anderson Motorsport. He will be partnered by Josh Fife, who left Brad Jones Racing to join; and by Declan Fraser, who will make his championship début.
- Jack Sipp and Matt McLean graduated to the series with Eggleston Motorsport.

=== Mid Season Changes ===
- Tim Blanchard drove a third Eggleston Motorsport Holden VF Commodore for Round 2, 4 & 5.
- Jack Perkins took over driving duties in Bradley Neill's ex-HRT Holden VF Commodore due to Neil having to step down due to his fight with cancer.
- Tony D'Alberto replaced Jack Sipp for Round 4 due to the Queensland Border Restrictions.
- Josh Fife joined Eggleston Motorsport for Round 5 to took over No. 38 Holden VF Commodore from Tony D'Alberto as Jack Sipp due to the Queensland Border Restrictions.

== Calendar ==
The calendar for the 2021 championship consisted of five rounds:

Round	Event	Circuit	Location	Dates
1	Mount Panorama 500	(New South Wales) Mount Panorama Circuit	Bathurst, New South Wales	27–28 February
2	Townsville 500	(Queensland) Reid Park Street Circuit	Townsville, Queensland	10–11 July
3	Townsville SuperSprint	(Queensland) Reid Park Street Circuit	Townsville, Queensland	17–18 July
4	Sydney SuperNight	(New South Wales) Sydney Motorsport Park	Eastern Creek, New South Wales	20–21 November
5	Bathurst 1000	(New South Wales) Mount Panorama Circuit	Bathurst, New South Wales	3–4 December

== Results and standings ==
=== Season summary ===
==== Super2 Series ====
Round	Race	Event	Pole position	Fastest lap	Winning driver	Winning team
1	1	Mount Panorama 500	(Australia) Angelo Mouzouris	(Australia) Broc Feeney	(Australia) Broc Feeney	Triple Eight Race Engineering
1	2	Mount Panorama 500	(Australia) Jayden Ojeda	(Australia) Tyler Everingham	(Australia) Tyler Everingham	MW Motorsport
2	3	Townsville 500	(Australia) Broc Feeney	(Australia) Broc Feeney	(Australia) Broc Feeney	Triple Eight Race Engineering
2	4	Townsville 500	(Australia) Broc Feeney	(Australia) Broc Feeney	(Australia) Broc Feeney	Triple Eight Race Engineering
3	5	Townsville SuperSprint	(Australia) Broc Feeney	(Australia) Jayden Ojeda	(Australia) Broc Feeney	Triple Eight Race Engineering
3	6	Townsville SuperSprint	(Australia) Zak Best	(Australia) Zak Best	(Australia) Zak Best	Tickford Racing
4	7	Sydney SuperNight	(Australia) Jayden Ojeda	(Australia) Tyler Everingham	(Australia) Tyler Everingham	MW Motorsport
4	8	Sydney SuperNight	(Australia) Broc Feeney	race abandoned (Note: Race 8 was suspended due to torrential rain and could not be re-started. As less than 50% of the race distance had been completed when the race was abandoned, no points were awarded.)		
5	9	Bathurst 1000	(Australia) Broc Feeney	(Australia) Broc Feeney	(Australia) Broc Feeney	Triple Eight Race Engineering
5	10	Bathurst 1000	(Australia) Jordan Boys	(Australia) Broc Feeney	(Australia) Jordan Boys	Image Racing

==== Super3 Series ====
Round	Race	Event	Pole position	Fastest lap	Winning driver	Winning team
1	1	Mount Panorama 500	(Australia) Jon McCorkindale	(Australia) Jon McCorkindale	(Australia) Jon McCorkindale	Mac Motorsport
1	2	Mount Panorama 500	(Australia) Jon McCorkindale	(Australia) Jon McCorkindale	(Australia) Michael Anderson	Anderson Motorsport
2	3	Townsville 500	(Australia) Michael Anderson	(Australia) Michael Anderson	(Australia) Michael Anderson	Anderson Motorsport
2	4	Townsville 500	(Australia) Nash Morris	(Australia) Nash Morris	(Australia) Nash Morris	Nemo Racing
3	5	Townsville SuperSprint	(Australia) Nash Morris	(Australia) Nash Morris	(Australia) Nash Morris	Nemo Racing
3	6	Townsville SuperSprint	(Australia) Nash Morris	(Australia) Nash Morris	(Australia) Blake Fardell	Blake Fardell Racing
4	7	Sydney SuperNight	(Australia) Nash Morris	(Australia) Blake Fardell	(Australia) Nash Morris	Nemo Racing
4	8	Sydney SuperNight	(Australia) Nash Morris	race abandoned		
5	9	Bathurst 1000	(Australia) Blake Fardell	(Australia) Nash Morris	(Australia) Nash Morris	Nemo Racing
5	10	Bathurst 1000	(Australia) Gary Collins	(Australia) Blake Fardell	(Australia) Reef McCarthy	Image Racing

=== Series standings ===
==== Points system ====
Points were awarded for each race at an event, to the driver of a car that completed at least 75% of the race distance and was running at the completion of the race. At least 50% of the planned race distance must be completed for the result to be valid and championship points awarded. The following points scales apply to both the Super2 and Super3 Series.

Position
1st	2nd	3rd	4th	5th	6th	7th	8th	9th	10th	11th	12th	13th	14th	15th	16th	17th
150	138	129	120	111	102	96	90	84	78	72	69	66	63	60	57	54

==== Super2 Series ====
Pos.	Driver	No.	BAT1 (New South Wales)		TOW1 (Queensland)		TOW2 (Queensland)		SMP (New South Wales)		BAT2 (New South Wales)		Pen.	Points
1	(Australia) Broc Feeney	888	1	8	**1**	**1**	**1**	2	2	**C**	**1**	2	0	1254
2	(Australia) Zak Best	78	4	2	4	4	3	**1**	15	C	4	4	0	1077
3	(Australia) Jayden Ojeda	31	5	**7**	2	3	2	3	**8**	C	2	Ret	0	969
4	(Australia) Matt Chahda	18	7	3	5	11	5	9	9	C	9	7	0	867
5	(Australia) Matt McLean	54	6	5	8	8	6	6	10	C	11	6	0	849
6	(Australia) Tyler Everingham	27	DNS	1	6	6	4	11	1	C	5	Ret	0	807
7	(Australia) Jordan Boys	49	3	DSQ	7	5	12	Ret	4	C	3	**1**	0	804
8	(Australia) Declan Fraser	777	9	6	10	7	10	10	3	C	DNS	DNS	0	645
9	(Australia) Aaron Seton	30	14	10	9	Ret	16	7	5	C	6	3	25	432
10	(Australia) Josh Fife	28/38	8	Ret	Ret	12	7	8	14	C	7	10	0	582
11	(Australia) Angelo Mouzouris	10/6	**2**	9	13	Ret	14	4	6	C	DNS	DNS	0	573
12	(Australia) Jaylyn Robotham	999	10	4			9	12	12	C	10	12	0	567
13	(Australia) Zane Morse	11	11	Ret	11	Ret	8	13	11	C	14	9	0	519
14	(Australia) Tim Blanchard	88			3	2			17	C	8	8	0	501
15	(Australia) Jon McCorkindale	69			12	9	13	14	13	C	12	11	0	489
16	(Australia) Jack Sipp	38	12	11	14	10	15	15					0	402
17	(New Zealand) Matthew Payne	10							16	C	13	5	0	234
18	(Australia) Jack Perkins	88					11	5					0	183
19	(Australia) Bradley Neill	22	13	12									0	135
20	(Australia) Tony D'Alberto	38							7	C			0	96
Pos.	Driver	No.	BAT1 (New South Wales)		TOW1 (Queensland)		TOW2 (Queensland)		SMP (New South Wales)		BAT2 (New South Wales)		Pen.	Points

Key
Colour	Result
Gold	Winner
Silver	Second place
Bronze	Third place
Green	Other points position
Blue	Other classified position
Blue	Not classified, finished (NC)
Purple	Not classified, retired (Ret)
Red	Did not qualify (DNQ)
Red	Did not pre-qualify (DNPQ)
Black	Disqualified (DSQ)
White	Did not start (DNS)
White	Race cancelled (C)
Blank	Did not practice (DNP)
Blank	Excluded (EX)
Blank	Did not arrive (DNA)
Blank	Withdrawn (WD)
Blank	Did not enter (cell empty)
Text formatting	Meaning
**Bold**	Pole position
Italics	Fastest lap

==== Super3 Series ====
Pos.	Driver	No.	BAT1 (New South Wales)		TOW1 (Queensland)		TOW2 (Queensland)		SMP (New South Wales)		BAT2 (New South Wales)		Pen.	Points
1	(Australia) Nash Morris	67	3	9	2	**1**	**1**	**2**	**1**	**C**	1	3	0	1218
2	(Australia) Michael Anderson	5	6	1	**1**	2	2	Ret	3	C	4	4	0	1047
3	(Australia) Reef McCarthy	61	5	4	3	3	3	3	2	C	Ret	1	0	1035
4	(Australia) Blake Fardell	77	2	DNS	Ret	5	4	1	4	C	**2**	2	0	915
5	(Australia) Jim Pollicina	7	9	5					5	C	3	5	0	546
6	(Australia) Jason Gomersall	35	7	6	Ret	6	6	4					0	531
7	(Australia) Brendan Strong	75	4	3	4	4	Ret	DNS					0	489
8	(Australia) David Murphy	24			7	7			6	C	10	6	0	474
9	(Australia) Steven Page	2	Ret	Ret	6	8			10	C	5	Ret	0	381
10	(Australia) Chris Smerdon	39			5	Ret	5	5					0	324
11	(Australia) Jason Foley	17	11	Ret					11	C	9	7	0	324
12	(Australia) Jon McCorkindale	69	**1**	**2**									0	288
13	(Australia) Elly Morrow	8							7	C	6	9	0	282
14	(Australia) Gary Collins	96			Ret	9	Ret	Ret	9	C	8	**DNS**	0	258
15	(Australia) James Masterton	219							8	C	7	Ret	0	186
16	(Australia) Ray Hislop	23	8	7									0	186
17	(Australia) Tony Auddino	4	10	8					Ret	C			0	168
18	(Australia) Paul Boschert	25							Ret	C	11	8	0	162
Pos.	Driver	No.	BAT1 (New South Wales)		TOW1 (Queensland)		TOW2 (Queensland)		SMP (New South Wales)		BAT2 (New South Wales)		Pen.	Points

Key
Colour	Result
Gold	Winner
Silver	Second place
Bronze	Third place
Green	Other points position
Blue	Other classified position
Blue	Not classified, finished (NC)
Purple	Not classified, retired (Ret)
Red	Did not qualify (DNQ)
Red	Did not pre-qualify (DNPQ)
Black	Disqualified (DSQ)
White	Did not start (DNS)
White	Race cancelled (C)
Blank	Did not practice (DNP)
Blank	Excluded (EX)
Blank	Did not arrive (DNA)
Blank	Withdrawn (WD)
Blank	Did not enter (cell empty)
Text formatting	Meaning
**Bold**	Pole position
Italics	Fastest lap
