= Aaron Seton =

Australian racing driver

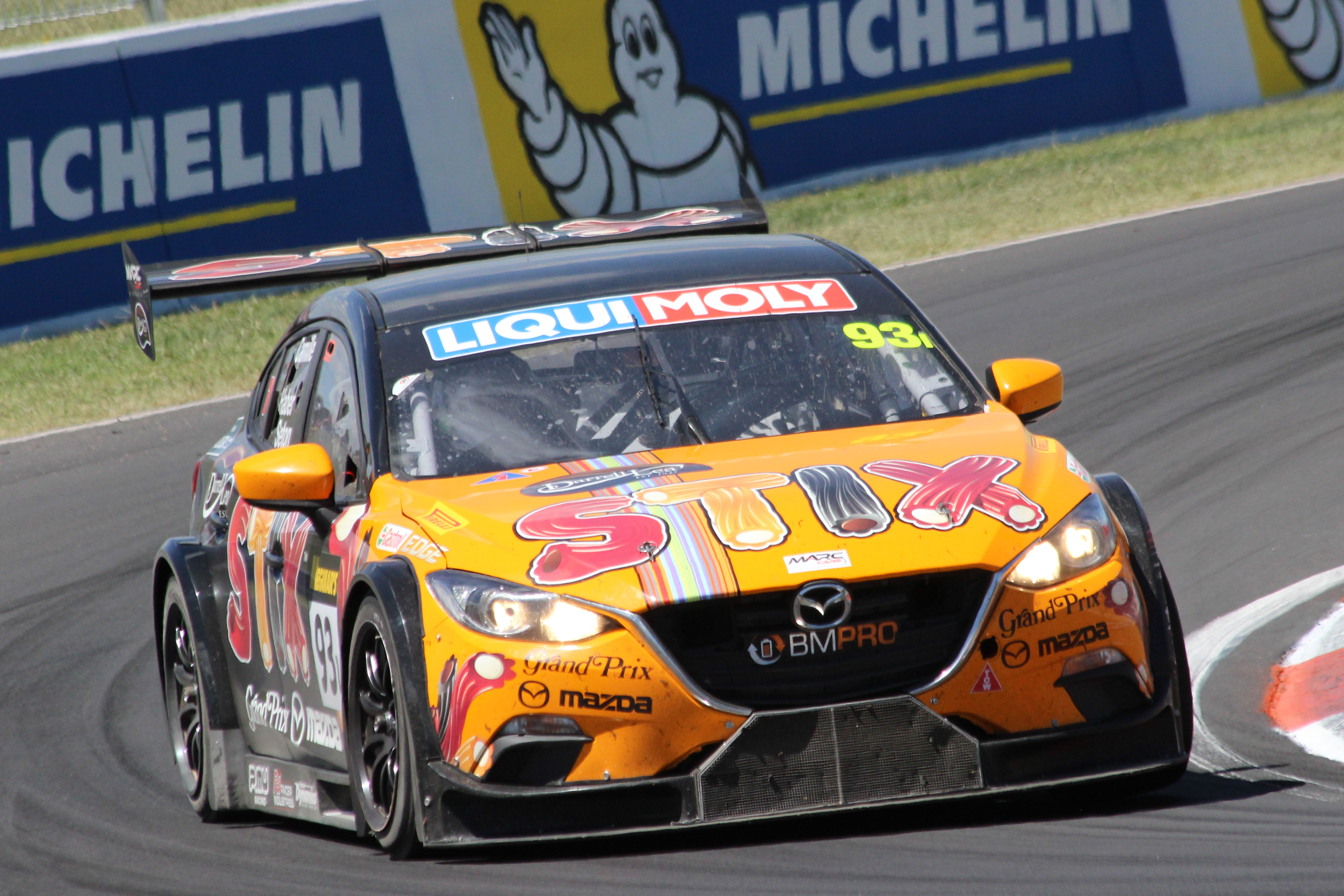
- Nationality: Australian
- Born: 2 July 1998 (age 28)
- Relatives: Glenn Seton (Father); Barry Seton (Grandfather)

Dunlop Super2 Series career
- Debut season: 2021
- Current team: Gomersall Motorsport
- Years active: 2021–2023
- Car number: 30
- Former teams: Matt Stone Racing
- Starts: 9
- Championships: 0
- Wins: 0
- Podiums: 1
- Poles: 0
- Fastest laps: 0

Championship titles
- 2019-2020: Trans Am Australia

Aaron Seton (born 2 July 1998) is an Australian racing driver. He is the son of former Australian Touring Car Championship winner Glenn Seton, and grandson of former Bathurst 1000 winner Barry Seton.

== Biography ==
Seton debuted in the Dunlop Super2 Series for Matt Stone Racing in 2021.

Seton competed in the 2022 Bathurst 1000 driving alongside Jack Le Brocq for Matt Stone Racing, becoming the first third-generation driver to compete in the Bathurst 1000.

== Career summary ==
=== Super2 Series results ===
(Races in bold indicate pole position) (Races in italics indicate fastest lap)

Super2 Series results
Year	Team	No.	Car	1	2	3	4	5	6	7	8	9	10	11	12	Position	Points
2021	Matt Stone Racing	30	Holden VF Commodore	BAT1; R1; 14	BAT1; R2; 10	TOW1; R3; 9	TOW1; R4; Ret	TOW2; R5; 16	TOW2; R6; 7	SMP; R7; 5	SMP; R8; C	BAT2; R9; 6	BAT2; R10; 3			9th	432
2022	Matt Stone Racing	30	Holden VF Commodore	SMP; R1; 5	SMP; R2; 7	WAN; R3; 12	WAN; R4; 10	TOW; R5; 5	TOW; R6; 8	SAN; R7; 16	SAN; R8; 9	BAT; R9; 9	BAT; R10; C	ADE; R11; Ret	ADE; R12; 12	9th	849
2023	Gommersall Motorsport	30	Holden ZB Commodore	NEW; R1; 13	NEW; R2; 7	WAN; R3; 9	WAN; R4; 10	**TOW**; **R5**; 3	TOW; R6; 13	SAN; R7; 9	SAN; R8; 11	BAT; R9; 11	BAT; R10; 12	ADE; R11; 5	ADE; R12; 12	7th	996

=== Supercars Championship results ===
(Races in bold indicate pole position) (Races in italics indicate fastest lap)

Supercars results
Year	Team	No.	Car	1	2	3	4	5	6	7	8	9	10	11	12	13	14	15	16	17	18	19	20	21	22	23	24	25	26	27	28	29	30	31	32	33	34	35	36	37	Position	Points
2022	Matt Stone Racing	34	Holden ZB Commodore	SMP; R1	SMP; R2	SYM; R3	SYM; R4	SYM; R5	MEL; R6	MEL; R7	MEL; R8	MEL; R9	BAR; R10	BAR; R11	BAR; R12	WIN; R13	WIN; R14	WIN; R15	HID; R16	HID; R17	HID; R18	TOW; R19	TOW; R20	BEN; R21	BEN; R22	BEN; R23	SAN; R24; PO	SAN; R25; PO	SAN; R26; PO	PUK; R27	PUK; R28	PUK; R29	BAT; R30; 14	SUR; R31	SUR; R32	NEW; R33	NEW; R34				44th	126
2025	Matt Stone Racing	35	Chevrolet Camaro ZL1	SYD; R1	SYD; R2	SYD; R3	MEL; R4	MEL; R5	MEL; R6	MEL; R7	TAU; R8	TAU; R9	TAU; R10	SYM; R11	SYM; R12	SYM; R13	BAR; R14	BAR; R15	BAR; R16	HID; R17	HID; R18	HID; R19	TOW; R20	TOW; R21	TOW; R22	QLD; R23	QLD; R24	QLD; R25	BEN; R26; 26	BAT; R27; 15	SUR; R28	SUR; R29	SAN; R30	SAN; R31	ADE; R32	ADE; R33	ADE; R34				49th	130
2026	Matt Stone Racing	30	Chevrolet Camaro ZL1	SMP; R1	SMP; R2	SMP; R3	MEL; R4	MEL; R5	MEL; R6	MEL; R7	TAU; R8	TAU; R9	CHR; R10	CHR; R11	CHR; R12	CHR; R13	SYM; R14	SYM; R15	SYM; R16	HID; R20	HID; R21	HID; R22	TOW; R23; 26	TOW; R24; 23	TOW; R25; 22	BAR; R17	BAR; R18	BAR; R19	QLD; R26; 26	QLD; R27; 20	QLD; R28; 22	BEN; R28; 12	BAT; R30; 3	SUR; R31	SUR; R32	SAN; R33	SAN; R34	ADE; R35	ADE; R36	ADE; R37	27th*	438*

=== Complete Bathurst 1000 results ===
Year	Team	Car	Co-driver	Position	Laps
2022	Matt Stone Racing	Holden Commodore ZB	(Australia) Jack Le Brocq	14th	161
2025	Matt Stone Racing	Chevrolet Camaro Mk.6	(Australia) Cameron Crick	15th	161
2026	Matt Stone Racing	Chevrolet Camaro Mk.6	(Australia) Zach Bates	**3rd**	161
