= Matt Chahda =

Australian racing car driver

- Nationality: Australian
- Born: Matthew Chahda; 12 September 1993 (age 33) Albury, New South Wales

Super2 Series career
- Debut season: 2015
- Current team: Matt Chahda Motorsport
- Car number: 18
- Starts: 124
- Wins: 0
- Podiums: 5
- Poles: 0
- Best finish: 4th in 2021

Previous series
- 2013-14, 16 2012 2012: Kumho V8 Touring Car Series; V8 Utes; New South Wales Formula Ford Championship

Awards
- 2012: NSW Formula Ford Rookie of the Year

Matthew Chahda (born 12 September 1993) is an Australian racing car driver. He currently competes in the Dunlop Super2 Series in the No. 18 Holden Commodore ZB.

== Racing career ==
=== Super2 Series ===
After competing in the 2013 and 2014 Kumho Tyres V8 Touring Car Series, Chahda graduated to the Dunlop Series competing in the first two rounds in 2015 for RSport Engineering and his own family team for the rest of the season and the full series in 2016, again with the family run team. After being refused for the Superlicence dispensation, Chada continued in the Super2 Series with a Holden VF Commodore and finished the championship in 16th place.

=== Supercars ===
On 9 February 2017, it was announced that Chahda would be stepping up to the main game, driving a Holden VF Commodore for Lucas Dumbrell Motorsport, despite having only finished 20th in the previous DVS season with not even a top-ten finish. This came off the back of the controversial decision the day before to allow 16 year old Alex Rullo to drive for the same team. Shortly after the announcement the Confederation of Australian Motor Sport released a statement which stated that Chahda had been refused dispensation for a Superlicence for the 2017 season.

Chahda and his team were accepted as a wildcard entrant into the 2022 Bathurst 1000. Running a Caltex-supported Walkinshaw Andretti United-built Holden Commodore ZB with fellow Super2 driver Jaylyn Robotham, the pairing finished 18th having lost two laps when the brakes seized in a pit-stop.

In December 2023, Chahda announced plans to run as a wildcard entrant for three events during the 2024 Supercars Championship. They would only end up racing at two events, the Sandown 500 and Bathurst 1000, pairing with Brad Vaughan. The pairing would finish 19th at Sandown completing their goal of finishing on the lead lap. They would have less success at Bathurst, after Vaughan spun on lap 23 after a collision with Chaz Mostert.

== Career results ==
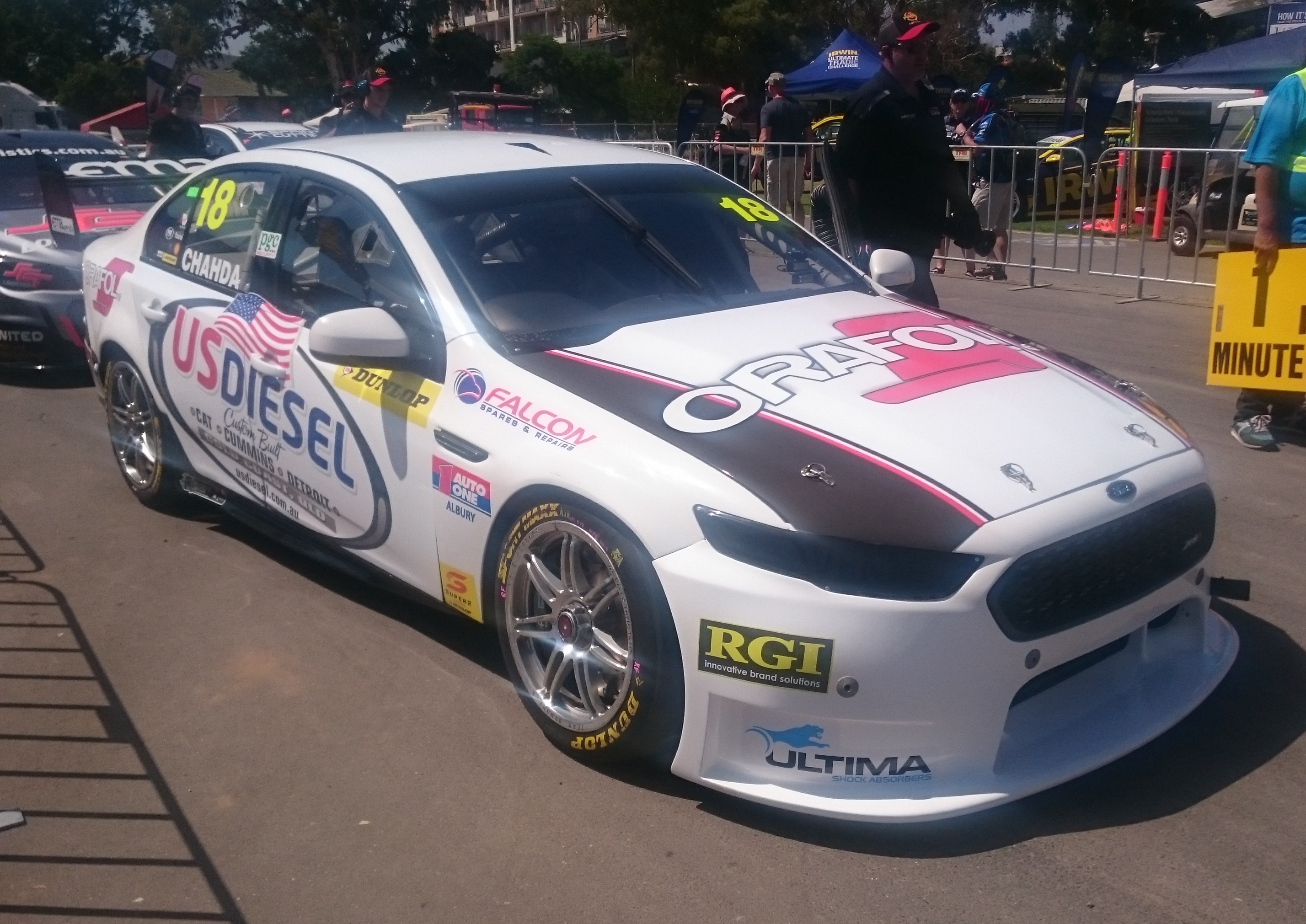
Chahda placed 15th in the 2019 Dunlop Super2 Series driving a Ford Falcon FG X

| Season | Series | Position | Car | Team |
|---|---|---|---|---|
| 2012 | New South Wales Formula Ford Championship | 3rd | Van Diemen RF04K | Matt Chahda Motorsport |
| 2012 | Australian V8 Utes Series | 53rd | Holden VE Ute SS | |
| 2013 | Kumho Tyres Australian V8 Touring Car Series | 10th | Ford AU Falcon | Matt Chahda Motorsport |
| 2014 | Kumho Tyres Australian V8 Touring Car Series | 4th | Ford BA Falcon | Matt Chahda Motorsport |
| 2015 | V8 Supercars Dunlop Series | 22nd | Holden VE Commodore; Ford FG Falcon | RSport Engineering; Matt Chahda Motorsport |
| 2016 | Supercars Dunlop Series | 20th | Ford FG Falcon | Matt Chahda Motorsport |
| 2016 | Kumho Tyres Australian V8 Touring Car Series | 25th | Ford BA Falcon | Matt Chahda Motorsport |
| 2017 | Dunlop Super2 Series | 16th | Holden VF Commodore | Matt Chahda Motorsport |
| 2018 | Dunlop Super2 Series | 20th | Holden VF Commodore | Matt Chahda Motorsport |
| 2019 | Dunlop Super2 Series | 15th | Ford FG X Falcon | Matt Chahda Motorsport |
| 2020 | Dunlop Super2 Series | 5th | Ford FG X Falcon | Matt Chahda Motorsport |
| 2021 | Dunlop Super2 Series | 4th | Ford FG X Falcon | Matt Chahda Motorsport |

=== Super3 Series results ===
(key) (Race results only)

Super3 Series results
| Year | Team | No. | Car | 1 | 2 | 3 | 4 | 5 | 6 | 7 | 8 | 9 | 10 | 11 | 12 | 13 | 14 | 15 | 16 | 17 | 18 | Position | Points |
|---|---|---|---|---|---|---|---|---|---|---|---|---|---|---|---|---|---|---|---|---|---|---|---|
| 2013 | Falcon Spares & Repairs | 00 | Ford AU Falcon | SMP; R1; 19 | SMP; R2; 12 | SMP; R3; Ret | MAL; R4; 14 | MAL; R5; 10 | MAL; R6; Ret | WIN; R7; Ret | WIN; R8; 8 | WIN; R9; Ret | QLD; R10; 9 | QLD; R11; 12 | QLD; R12; 12 | PHI; R13; Ret | PHI; R14; 11 | PHI; R15; 9 | SAN; R16; 8 | SAN; R17; 6 | SAN; R18; 7 | 12th | 161 |
| 2014 | Falcon Spares & Repairs | 18 | Ford BA Falcon | MAL; R1; Ret | MAL; R2; 3 | MAL; R3; 3 | WIN; R4; 8 | WIN; R5; 3 | WIN; R6; 3 | QLD; R7; 4 | QLD; R8; 3 | QLD; R9; Ret | PHI; R10; Ret | PHI; R11; 4 | PHI; R12; Ret | WAK; R13; 5 | WAK; R14; 4 | WAK; R15; 2 | SMP; R16; 4 | SMP; R17; 3 | SMP; R18; 6 | 4th | 447 |

=== Super2 Series results ===
(key) (Race results only)

Super2 Series results
| Year | Team | No. | Car | 1 | 2 | 3 | 4 | 5 | 6 | 7 | 8 | 9 | 10 | 11 | 12 | 13 | 14 | 15 | 16 | 17 | 18 | 19 | 20 | 21 | Position | Points |
|---|---|---|---|---|---|---|---|---|---|---|---|---|---|---|---|---|---|---|---|---|---|---|---|---|---|---|
| 2015 | RSport Engineering | 11 | Holden VE Commodore | ADE; R1; 14 | ADE; R2; 17 | BAR; R3; DNS | BAR; R4; DNS | BAR; R5; DNS | | | | | | | | | | | | | | | | | 22nd | 423 |
| 2015 | Matt Chahda Motorsport | 18 | Ford FG Falcon | | | | | | WIN; R6; 17 | WIN; R7; 13 | WIN; R8; 23 | TOW; R9; 17 | TOW; R10; Ret | QLD; R11; 19 | QLD; R12; 12 | QLD; R13; 19 | BAT; R14; Ret | SYD; R15; 14 | SYD; R16; Ret | | | | | | 22nd | 423 |
| 2016 | Matt Chahda Motorsport | 18 | Ford FG Falcon | ADE; R1; 15 | ADE; R2; 15 | PHI; R3; 16 | PHI; R4; 20 | PHI; R5; 17 | BAR; R6; 23 | BAR; R7; 13 | BAR; R8; Ret | TOW; R9; 13 | TOW; R10; 14 | SAN; R11; DSQ | SAN; R12; DSQ | SAN; R13; DNS | BAT; R14; 18 | SYD; R15; 11 | SYD; R16; Ret | | | | | | 20th | 585 |
| 2017 | Matt Chahda Motorsport | 18 | Holden VF Commodore | ADE; R1; 12 | ADE; R2; 17 | ADE; R3; 15 | SYM; R4; 18 | SYM; R5; 12 | SYM; R6; 18 | SYM; R7; 18 | PHI; R8; 20 | PHI; R9; 18 | PHI; R10; 19 | PHI; R11; 17 | TOW; R12; 17 | TOW; R13; 11 | SMP; R14; 21 | SMP; R15; Ret | SMP; R16; DNS | SMP; R17; 15 | SAN; R18; 11 | SAN; R19; 15 | NEW; R20; 12 | NEW; R21; 14 | 16th | 735 |
| 2018 | Matt Chahda Motorsport | 18 | Holden VF Commodore | ADE; R1; 19 | ADE; R2; 18 | ADE; R3; 14 | SYM; R4; 16 | SYM; R5; 15 | SYM; R6; Ret | BAR; R7; 20 | BAR; R8; 17 | BAR; R9; 15 | TOW; R10; Ret | TOW; R11; 11 | SAN; R12; 9 | SAN; R13; 15 | BAT; R14; 14 | NEW; R15; 17 | NEW; R16; C | | | | | | 20th | 688 |
| 2019 | Matt Chahda Motorsport | 18 | Ford FG X Falcon | ADE; R1; 13 | ADE; R2; 14 | ADE; R3; 14 | BAR; R4; 17 | BAR; R5; 19 | TOW; R6; 9 | TOW; R7; Ret | QLD; R8; 15 | QLD; R9; Ret | BAT; R10; 9 | SAN; R11; 14 | SAN; R12; 10 | NEW; R13; 11 | NEW; R14; Ret | | | | | | | | 15th | 755 |
| 2020 | Matt Chahda Motorsport | 18 | Ford FG X Falcon | ADE; R1; 7 | ADE; R2; 5 | ADE; R3; 6 | SYD; R4; 12 | SYD; R5; 10 | BAT; R6; 5 | BAT; R7; 6 | | | | | | | | | | | | | | | 5th | 566 |
| 2021 | Matt Chahda Motorsport | 18 | Ford FG X Falcon | BAT; R1; 7 | BAT; R2; 3 | TOW1; R3; 5 | TOW1; R4; 11 | TOW2; R5; 5 | TOW2; R6; 9 | SMP; R7; 9 | SMP; R8; C | BAT; R9; 9 | BAT; R10; 7 | | | | | | | | | | | | 4th | 867 |
| 2022 | Matt Chahda Motorsport | 18 | Ford FG X Falcon | SMP; R1; 10 | SMP; R2; 8 | BAR; R3; 11 | BAR; R4; 13 | TOW; R5; 3 | TOW; R6; 2 | SAN; R7; 6 | SAN; R8; 13 | BAT; R9 | BAT; R10 | ADE; R11; 11 | ADE; R12; 2 | | | | | | | | | | 6th | 957 |
| 2023 | Matt Chahda Motorsport | 18 | Holden ZB Commodore | NEW; R1; 7 | NEW; R2; 3 | BAR; R3; 5 | BAR; R4; 9 | TOW; R5; 7 | TOW; R6; 8 | SAN; R7; 12 | SAN; R8; 13 | BAT; R9; 8 | BAT; R10; 9 | ADE; R11; Ret | ADE; R12; 11 | | | | | | | | | | 8th | 969 |
| 2024 | Matt Chahda Motorsport | 18 | Holden ZB Commodore | BAT1; R1; 14 | BAT1; R2; Ret | BAR; R3; 15 | BAR; R4; DNS | TOW; R5; 8 | TOW; R6; Ret | SAN; R7 | SAN; R8 | BAT2; R9 | BAT2; R10 | ADE; R11; Ret | ADE; R12; Ret | | | | | | | | | | 23rd | 213 |

=== Supercars Championship results ===
Supercars results
| Year | Team | No. | Car | 1 | 2 | 3 | 4 | 5 | 6 | 7 | 8 | 9 | 10 | 11 | 12 | 13 | 14 | 15 | 16 | 17 | 18 | 19 | 20 | 21 | 22 | 23 | 24 | 25 | 26 | 27 | 28 | 29 | 30 | 31 | 32 | 33 | 34 | Position | Points |
|---|---|---|---|---|---|---|---|---|---|---|---|---|---|---|---|---|---|---|---|---|---|---|---|---|---|---|---|---|---|---|---|---|---|---|---|---|---|---|---|
| 2022 | Matt Chahda Motorsport | 118 | Holden ZB Commodore | SMP; R1 | SMP; R2 | SYM; R3 | SYM; R4 | SYM; R5 | MEL; R6 | MEL; R7 | MEL; R8 | MEL; R9 | BAR; R10 | BAR; R11 | BAR; R12 | WIN; R13 | WIN; R14 | WIN; R15 | HID; R16 | HID; R17 | HID; R18 | TOW; R19 | TOW; R20 | BEN; R21 | BEN; R22 | BEN; R23 | SAN; R24 | SAN; R25 | SAN; R26 | PUK; R27 | PUK; R28 | PUK; R29 | BAT; R30; 18 | SUR; R31 | SUR; R32 | NEW; R33 | NEW; R34 | 48th | 102 |
| 2024 | Matt Chahda Motorsport | 118 | Chevrolet Camaro ZL1 | BAT1; R1 | BAT1; R2 | MEL; R3 | MEL; R4 | MEL; R5 | MEL; R6 | TAU; R7 | TAU; R8 | BAR; R9 | BAR; R10 | HID; R11 | HID; R12 | TOW; R13 | TOW; R14 | SMP; R15 | SMP; R16 | SYM; R17 | SYM; R18 | SAN; R19; 19 | BAT2; R20; 25 | SUR; R21 | SUR; R22 | ADE; R23 | ADE; R24 | | | | | | | | | | | 51st | 156 |

=== Complete Bathurst 1000 results ===
| Year | Team | Car | Co-driver | Position | Laps |
|---|---|---|---|---|---|
| 2022 | Matt Chahda Motorsport | Holden Commodore ZB | (Australia) Jaylyn Robotham | 18th | 161 |
| 2024 | Matt Chahda Motorsport | Chevrolet Camaro Mk.6 | (Australia) Bradley Vaughan | 25th | 146 |
