= 2023 Super2 Series =

Motor racing competition

The 2023 Dunlop Super2 & Super3 Series was an Australian motor racing competition for Supercars as a support series. It was the twenty-fourth running of the Supercars Development Series, the second tier of competition in Supercars racing. Since joining as a class in 2021 this marks at the same time as the sixteenth running of the Super3 Series, the third tier of competition in Supercars racing (Officially in 2019 as the Kumho Tyre Super3 Series).

It was the first year that the Super2 class will run the Gen2 cars (Holden Commodore ZB and Ford Mustang GT), while the Super3 class ran the older Project Blueprint and Car of the Future vehicles.

The Super2 Class was won by Kai Allen in a Holden ZB Commodore, while the Super3 class was won by Jobe Stewart in a Holden VF Commodore.

== Teams and drivers ==
=== Classes ===
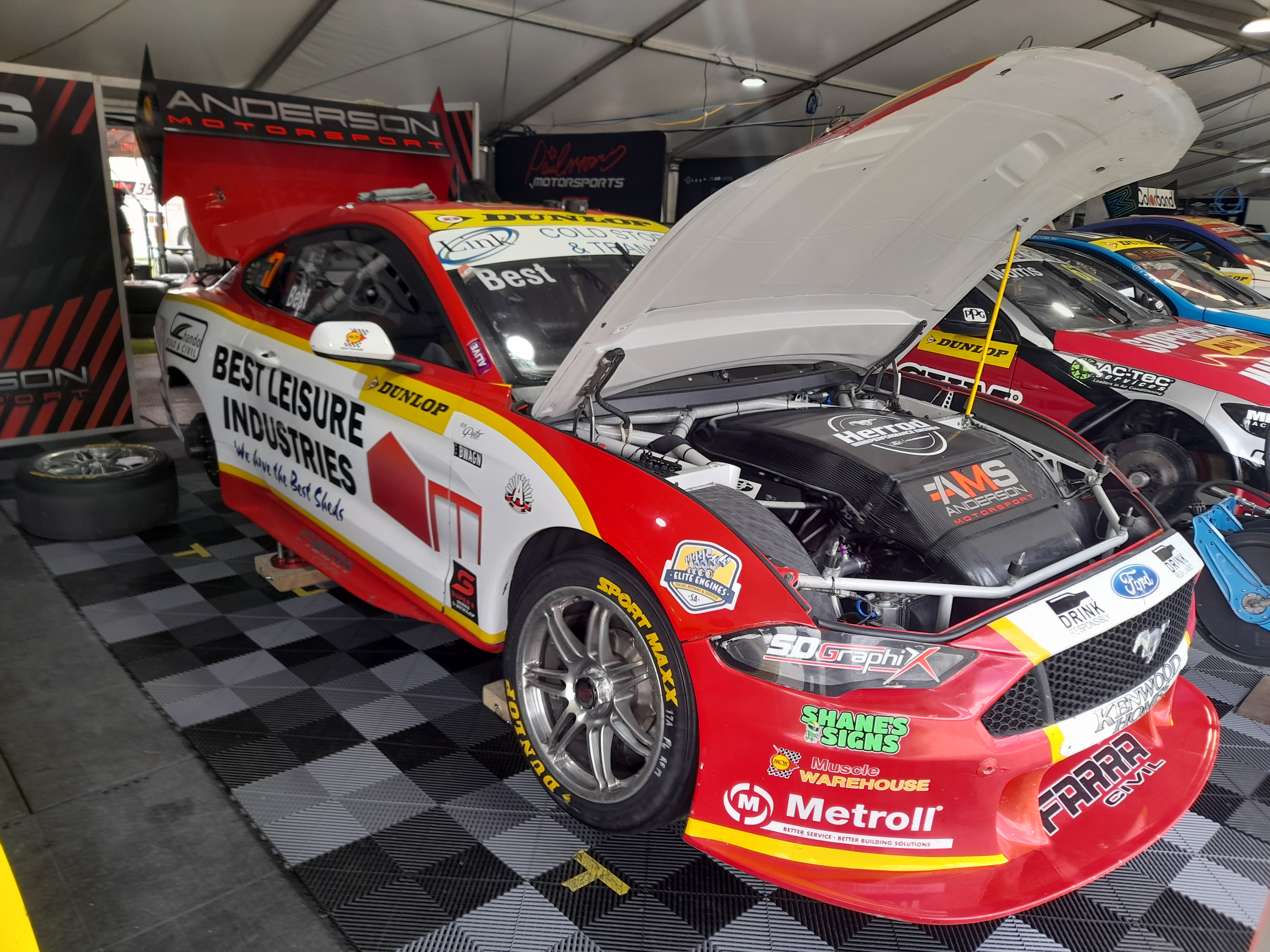
Zak Best placed second in the series driving a Ford Mustang GT

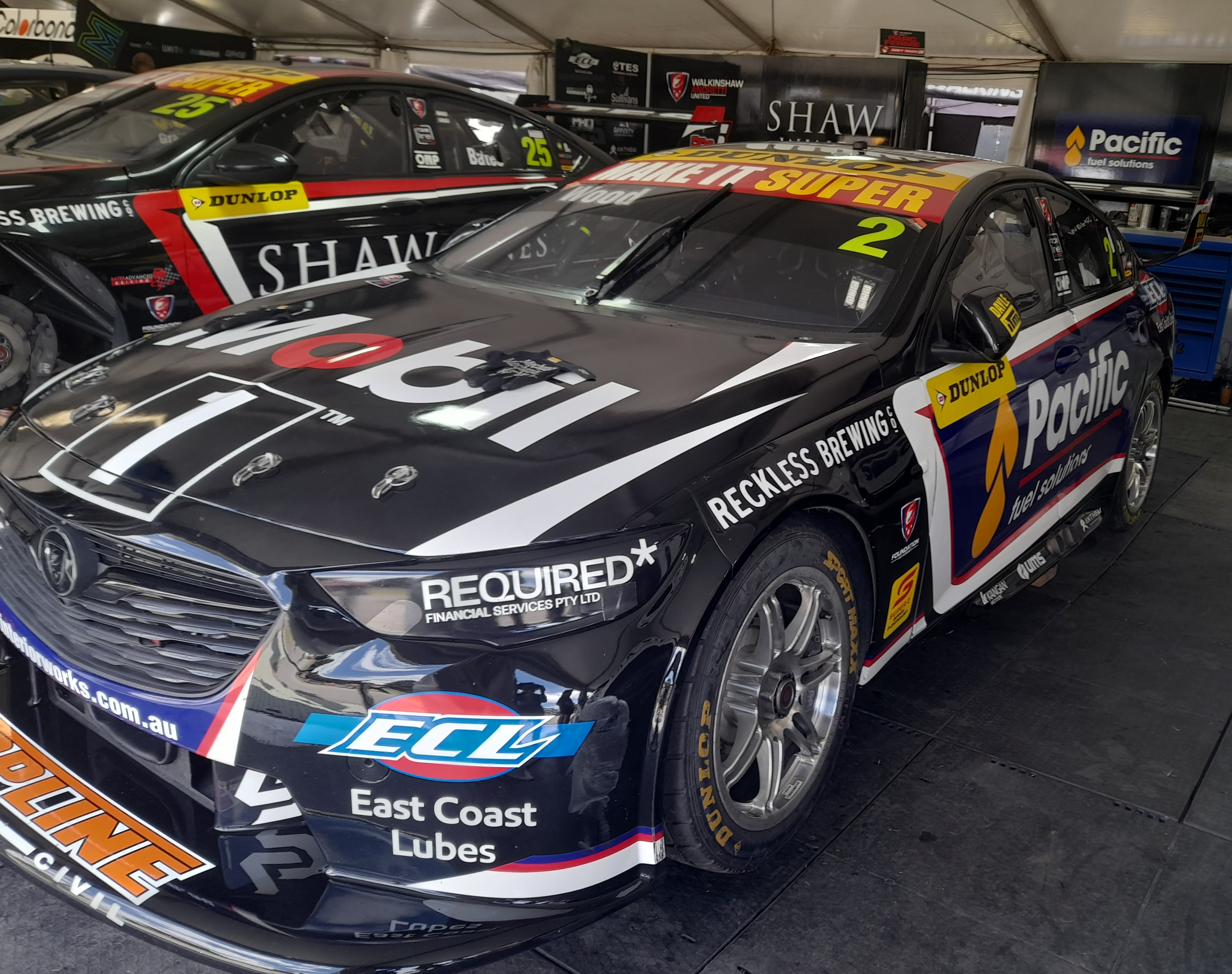
Ryan Wood placed third in Super2 driving a Holden Commodore ZB

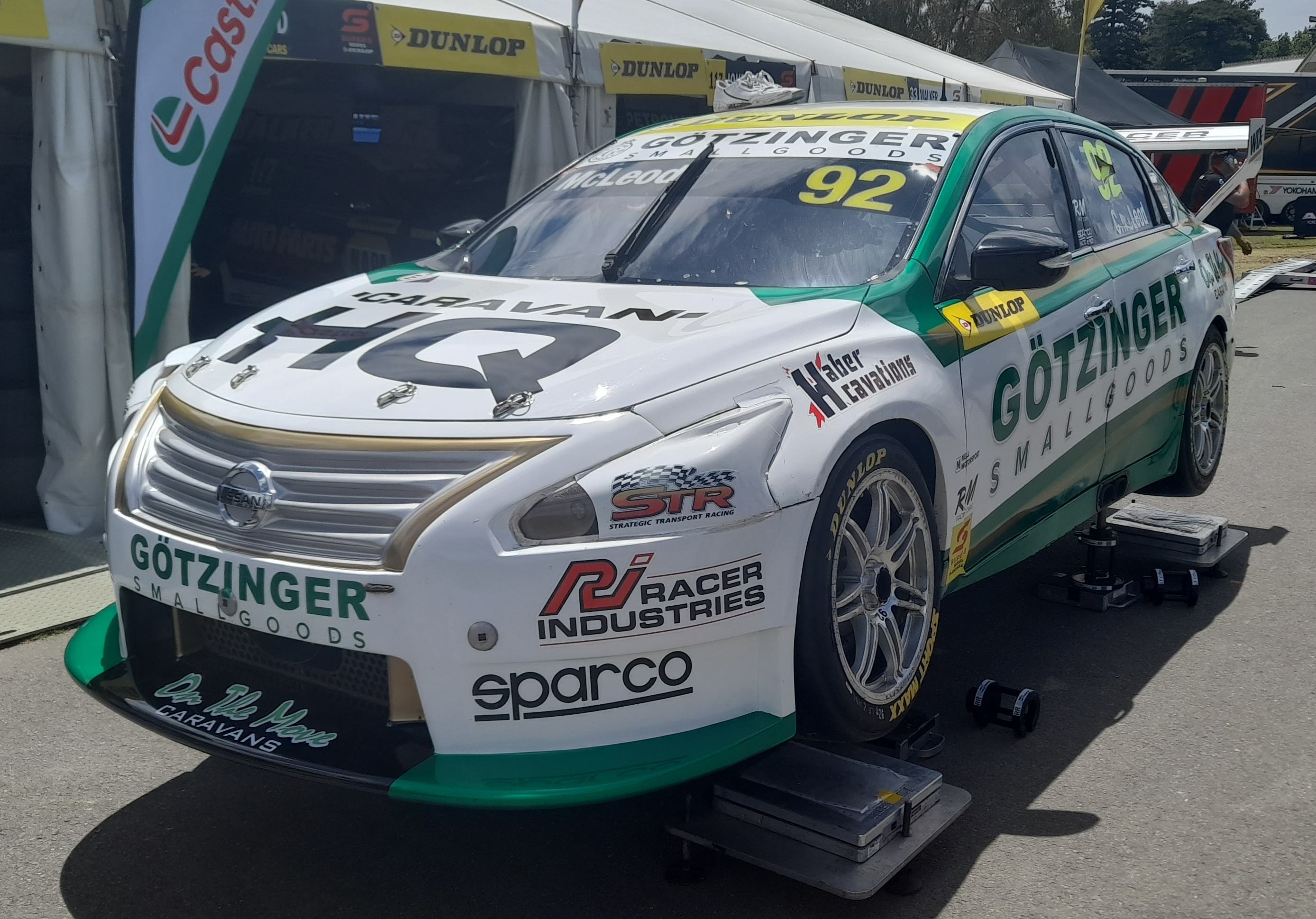
Cameron McLeod placed third in Super3 driving a Nissan Altima

Name	Regulation	Vehicles
Super2	2018 to 2022 Gen2	Ford Mustang S550; Holden ZB Commodore
Super3	2013 to 2017 Car of the Future	Ford FG X Falcon; Holden VF Commodore; Mercedes-AMG E63 W212; Nissan Altima L33; Volvo S60 Mk.2
Super3	2003 to 2012 Project Blueprint	Ford FG Falcon; Holden VE Commodore

=== Entry list ===
Manufacturer	Model	Team	No.	Driver name	Class		Rounds
Manufacturer	Model	Team	No.	Driver name	Car	Driver	Rounds
Ford	Falcon FG X	Tickford Racing	55	(Australia) Rylan Gray	S3	R	6
Ford	Mustang GT	Tickford Racing	5	(Australia) Brad Vaughan	S2	R	All
Ford	Mustang GT	Tickford Racing	6	(Australia) Elly Morrow	S2		All
Ford	Mustang GT	MW Motorsport	3	(Australia) Jaylyn Robotham	S2		1
Ford	Mustang GT	AIM Motorsport	11	(Australia) Zane Morse	S2		All
Ford	Mustang GT	Anderson Motorsport	17	(Australia) Zak Best	S2		All
Ford	Mustang GT	SCHRAMM Group Racing	27	(Australia) Aaron Cameron	S2	R	4–6
Ford	Mustang GT	Blanchard Racing Team	78	(Australia) Aaron Love	S2	R	All
Ford	Mustang GT	Masterton Motorsport	219	(Australia) James Masterton	S2		1–5
Holden	Commodore VE	Pollicina Motorsport	7	(Australia) Jim Pollicina	S3		1
Holden	Commodore VF	Gommersall Motorsport	35	(Australia) Jason Gommersall	S3		1–2
Holden	Commodore VF	Matt Stone Racing	39	(Australia) Chris Smerdon	S3		1–3
Holden	Commodore VF	AIM Motorsport	89	(Australia) Ryan Gilroy	S3	R	1–3
Holden	Commodore VF	Image Racing	999	(Australia) Jobe Stewart	S3	R	All
Holden	Commodore VF	Eggleston Motorsport	97	(New Zealand) Matthew McCutcheon	S3	R	1–2
Holden	Commodore ZB	Eggleston Motorsport	26	(Australia) Kai Allen	S2	R	All
Holden	Commodore ZB	Eggleston Motorsport	38	(Australia) Cameron Crick	S2		All
Holden	Commodore ZB	Eggleston Motorsport	54	(Australia) Jordyn Sinni	S2	R	All
Holden	Commodore ZB	Eggleston Motorsport	88	(Australia) Cooper Murray	S2	R	All
Holden	Commodore ZB	Walkinshaw Andretti United	2	(New Zealand) Ryan Wood	S2	R	All
Holden	Commodore ZB	Walkinshaw Andretti United	25	(Australia) Zach Bates	S2	R	All
Holden	Commodore ZB	Matt Chahda Motorsport	18/50	(Australia) Matt Chahda	S2		All
Holden	Commodore ZB	Gommersall Motorsport	30	(Australia) Aaron Seton	S2		All
Holden	Commodore ZB	Callum Walker	33	(Australia) Callum Walker	S2	R	All
Holden	Commodore ZB	Brad Jones Racing	43	(Australia) Lochie Dalton	S2	R	All
Holden	Commodore ZB	Image Racing	49	(Australia) Jay Hanson	S2		All
Holden	Commodore ZB	World Gym NEMO Racing	67	(Australia) Nash Morris	S2		All
Holden	Commodore ZB	Erebus Motorsport	70	(Australia) Jack Perkins	S2		1–5
Holden	Commodore ZB	Erebus Motorsport	99	(Australia) Jordan Boys	S2		6
Nissan	Altima L33	MW Motorsport	3	(Australia) Valentino Astuti	S3	R	4–5
Nissan	Altima L33	Kelly Racing	22	(Australia) Mason Kelly	S3	R	All
Nissan	Altima L33	AIM Motorsport	89	(Australia) Ryan Gilroy	S3	R	4–5
Nissan	Altima L33	Ryan McLeod Racing	92	(Australia) Cameron McLeod	S3	R	All
Nissan	Altima L33	Team Johnson	117	(Australia) Jett Johnson	S3	R	All

Icon	Class
S2	Super2 (Gen2)
S3	Super3 (Car of the Future)
S3	Super3 (Project Blueprint)
R	Rookie Cup

=== Team changes ===
==== Super2 ====
Anderson Motorsport returned to the Super2 Series after purchasing an ex-Dick Johnson Racing Mustang.

Brema Group Racing switched from driving a single Holden Commodore VF, to an ex-Tickford Racing Ford Mustang GT.

Triple Eight Race Engineering withdrew from the Super2 Series, to focus on Supercars and GT programs.

Blanchard Racing Team announced they would run a Super2 program for the first time in 2023, in preparation for expanding to a second car in the Supercars Championship.

Tickford Racing expanded to a two-car team.

Matt Stone Racing withdrew from the Super2 Series, in order to focus resources on their Supercars program.

Walkinshaw Andretti United announced they would run a Super2 program for the first time since Nick Percat finished 4th in 2012, running two Holden ZB Commodores.

MW Motorsport switched from their Nissan Altima L33s to an ex-Tickford Racing Ford Mustang GT.

Matt Chahda Motorsport switched from a Ford FG X Falcon to an ex-Brad Jones Racing ZB Commodore.

=== Driver changes ===
==== Super2 ====
Kai Allen remained with Eggleston Motorsport in Super2 after graduating from Super3 Series. He is joined by 2020 Porsche Carrera Cup Australia champion Cooper Murray and Australian Formula Ford Championship driver Jordyn Sinni.

Aaron Cameron joined the series at Sandown, running an ex Grove Racing Ford Mustang.

Porsche Carrera Cup Australia driver Aaron Love became Blanchard Racing Team’s first Super2 driver.

Elly Morrow switched from Brad Jones Racing to Tickford Racing in Super2.

2022 Super3 champion Brad Vaughan made his Super2 debut at Tickford Racing.

Zach Bates graduated from the Toyota 86 Racing Series to join Walkinshaw Andretti United.

Aaron Seton switched from Matt Stone Racing to Gommersall Motorsport in Super2.

==== Super3 ====
Cameron McLeod, grandson of 1987 James Hardie 1000 race winner Peter McLeod, graduated to Super3 from Australian Formula Ford driving a Nissan Altima L33.

== Calendar ==
Round	Event	Circuit	Location	Dates
1	Newcastle 500	(New South Wales) Newcastle Street Circuit	Newcastle, New South Wales	11–12 March
2	Perth SuperSprint	(Western Australia) Wanneroo Raceway	Neerabup, Western Australia	29–30 April
3	Townsville 500	(Queensland) Reid Park Street Circuit	Townsville, Queensland	8–9 July
4	Sandown 500	(Victoria (state)) Sandown Raceway	Springvale, Victoria	16–17 September
5	Bathurst 1000	(New South Wales) Mount Panorama Circuit	Bathurst, New South Wales	6–7 October
6	Adelaide 500	(South Australia) Adelaide Street Circuit	Adelaide, South Australia	25–26 November

== Results and standings ==
=== Season summary ===
==== Super2 Series ====
Round	Event	Pole position	Fastest lap	Winning driver	Winning team	Round Winner
1	(New South Wales) Newcastle 500	(Australia) Cooper Murray	(Australia) Cooper Murray	(Australia) Cooper Murray	Eggleston Motorsport	(Australia) Zak Best
1	(New South Wales) Newcastle 500	(New Zealand) Ryan Wood	(Australia) Kai Allen	(Australia) Zak Best	Anderson Motorsport	(Australia) Zak Best
2	(Western Australia) Perth SuperSprint	(Australia) Zak Best	(New Zealand) Ryan Wood	(New Zealand) Ryan Wood	Walkinshaw Andretti United	(New Zealand) Ryan Wood
2	(Western Australia) Perth SuperSprint	(Australia) Brad Vaughan	(New Zealand) Ryan Wood	(New Zealand) Ryan Wood	Walkinshaw Andretti United	(New Zealand) Ryan Wood
3	(Queensland) Townsville 500	(Australia) Aaron Seton	(Australia) Kai Allen	(Australia) Kai Allen	Eggleston Motorsport	(Australia) Kai Allen
3	(Queensland) Townsville 500	(Australia) Kai Allen	(Australia) Zane Morse	(Australia) Zak Best	Anderson Motorsport	(Australia) Kai Allen
4	(Victoria (state)) Sandown 500	(New Zealand) Ryan Wood	(New Zealand) Ryan Wood	(New Zealand) Ryan Wood	Walkinshaw Andretti United	(New Zealand) Ryan Wood
4	(Victoria (state)) Sandown 500	(Australia) Brad Vaughan	(New Zealand) Ryan Wood	(Australia) Cooper Murray	Eggleston Motorsport	(New Zealand) Ryan Wood
5	(New South Wales) Bathurst 1000	(Australia) Zak Best	(Australia) Aaron Love	(Australia) Aaron Love	Blanchard Racing Team	(Australia) Kai Allen
5	(New South Wales) Bathurst 1000	(Australia) Zak Best	(New Zealand) Ryan Wood	(Australia) Kai Allen	Eggleston Motorsport	(Australia) Kai Allen
6	(South Australia) Adelaide 500	(New Zealand) Ryan Wood	(New Zealand) Ryan Wood	(New Zealand) Ryan Wood	Walkinshaw Andretti United	(New Zealand) Ryan Wood
6	(South Australia) Adelaide 500	(New Zealand) Ryan Wood	(New Zealand) Ryan Wood	(New Zealand) Ryan Wood	Walkinshaw Andretti United	(New Zealand) Ryan Wood

==== Super3 Series ====
Round	Event	Pole position	Fastest lap	Winning driver	Winning team	Round Winner
1	(New South Wales) Newcastle 500	(Australia) Cameron McLeod	(Australia) Cameron McLeod	(Australia) Jobe Stewart	Image Racing	(Australia) Jobe Stewart
1	(New South Wales) Newcastle 500	(Australia) Cameron McLeod	(Australia) Jobe Stewart	(Australia) Cameron McLeod	Ryan McLeod Racing	(Australia) Jobe Stewart
2	(Western Australia) Perth SuperSprint	(Australia) Cameron McLeod	(Australia) Cameron McLeod	(Australia) Jobe Stewart	Image Racing	(Australia) Cameron McLeod
2	(Western Australia) Perth SuperSprint	(Australia) Jobe Stewart	(Australia) Cameron McLeod	(Australia) Cameron McLeod	Ryan McLeod Racing	(Australia) Cameron McLeod
3	(Queensland) Townsville 500	(Australia) Cameron McLeod	(Australia) Cameron McLeod	(Australia) Cameron McLeod	Ryan McLeod Racing	(Australia) Cameron McLeod
3	(Queensland) Townsville 500	(Australia) Cameron McLeod	(Australia) Cameron McLeod	(Australia) Cameron McLeod	Ryan McLeod Racing	(Australia) Cameron McLeod
4	(Victoria (state)) Sandown 500	(Australia) Cameron McLeod	(Australia) Cameron McLeod	(Australia) Jobe Stewart	Image Racing	(Australia) Jobe Stewart
4	(Victoria (state)) Sandown 500	(Australia) Cameron McLeod	(Australia) Jobe Stewart	(Australia) Jobe Stewart	Image Racing	(Australia) Jobe Stewart
5	(New South Wales) Bathurst 1000	(Australia) Cameron McLeod	(Australia) Cameron McLeod	(Australia) Cameron McLeod	Ryan McLeod Racing	(Australia) Cameron McLeod
5	(New South Wales) Bathurst 1000	(Australia) Cameron McLeod	(Australia) Cameron McLeod	(Australia) Cameron McLeod	Ryan McLeod Racing	(Australia) Cameron McLeod
6	(South Australia) Adelaide 500	(Australia) Jobe Stewart	(Australia) Cameron McLeod	(Australia) Cameron McLeod	Ryan McLeod Racing	(Australia) Cameron McLeod
6	(South Australia) Adelaide 500	(Australia) Jobe Stewart	(Australia) Cameron McLeod	(Australia) Cameron McLeod	Ryan McLeod Racing	(Australia) Cameron McLeod

=== Series standings ===
==== Points system ====
Points were awarded for each race at an event, to the driver of a car that completed at least 75% of the race distance and was running at the completion of the race. At least 50% of the planned race distance must be completed for the result to be valid and championship points awarded. The following points scales apply to both the Super2 and Super3 Series.

Position
1st	2nd	3rd	4th	5th	6th	7th	8th	9th	10th	11th	12th	13th	14th	15th	16th	17th	18th	19th	20th
150	138	129	120	111	102	96	90	84	78	72	69	66	63	60	57	54	51	48	45

==== Super2 Series ====
Pos.	Driver	No.	NEW (New South Wales)		BAR (Western Australia)		TOW (Queensland)		SAN (Victoria (state))		BAT (New South Wales)		ADE (South Australia)		Pen.	Points
1	(Australia) Kai Allen	26	4	6	19	4	1	**2**	4	4	3	1	3	5	0	1437
2	(Australia) Zak Best	17	3	1	**3**	7	9	1	2	12	**2**	**2**	13	2	0	1431
3	(New Zealand) Ryan Wood	2	8	**Ret**	1	1	8	5	**1**	3	Ret	4	**1**	**1**	0	1296
4	(Australia) Cooper Murray	88	**1**	5	13	3	6	16	7	1	Ret	5	2	4	0	1230
5	(Australia) Zach Bates	25	11	13	10	18	10	7	3	5	4	3	10	3	0	1143
6	(Australia) Jay Hanson	49	5	4	8	6	18	6	8	7	Ret	6	15	6	0	1029
7	(Australia) Aaron Seton	30	13	7	9	10	**3**	13	9	11	11	12	5	12	0	996
8	(Australia) Matt Chahda	18	7	3	5	9	7	8	12	13	8	9	Ret	11	0	969
9	(Australia) Aaron Love	78	18	2	6	2	4	Ret	15	Ret	1	DNS	11	8	0	921
10	(Australia) Lochie Dalton	43	12	DNS	4	5	19	12	14	15	7	8	7	15	0	885
11	(Australia) Cameron Crick	38	10	Ret	14	12	2	9	11	Ret	9	11	4	7	0	876
12	(Australia) Brad Vaughan	5	6	Ret	2	**Ret**	12	4	16	**2**	5	10	DNS	DNS	0	813
13	(Australia) Elly Morrow	6	16	10	16	16	15	11	17	14	14	13	14	16	0	747
14	(Australia) Jordyn Sinni	54	Ret	8	12	13	13	10	13	6	10	15	Ret	13	0	741
15	(Australia) Zane Morse	11	14	15	7	8	5	3	5	Ret	Ret	Ret	Ret	14	35	688
16	(Australia) Callum Walker	33	15	9	18	15	14	14	19	DNS	13	14	12	17	0	681
17	(Australia) Nash Morris	67	Ret	11	11	14	11	15	20	9	12	Ret	8	Ret	0	627
18	(Australia) Aaron Cameron	27							6	10	6	7	9	10	0	540
19	(Australia) James Masterton	219	17	12	17	17	17	17	18	Ret	15	16			0	510
20	(Australia) Jack Perkins	70	2	Ret	15	11	DNS	DNS	10	8	Ret	DNS			0	438
21	(Australia) Jordan Boys	99											6	9	0	186
22	(Australia) Jaylyn Robotham	3	9	14											0	147
Pos.	Driver	No.	NEW (New South Wales)		BAR (Western Australia)		TOW (Queensland)		SAN (Victoria (state))		BAT (New South Wales)		ADE (South Australia)		Pen.	Points

Key
Colour	Result
Gold	Winner
Silver	Second place
Bronze	Third place
Green	Other points position
Blue	Other classified position
Blue	Not classified, finished (NC)
Purple	Not classified, retired (Ret)
Red	Did not qualify (DNQ)
Red	Did not pre-qualify (DNPQ)
Black	Disqualified (DSQ)
White	Did not start (DNS)
White	Race cancelled (C)
Blank	Did not practice (DNP)
Blank	Excluded (EX)
Blank	Did not arrive (DNA)
Blank	Withdrawn (WD)
Blank	Did not enter (cell empty)
Text formatting	Meaning
**Bold**	Pole position
Italics	Fastest lap

==== Super3 Series ====
Pos.	Driver	No.	NEW (New South Wales)		BAR (Western Australia)		TOW (Queensland)		SAN (Victoria (state))		BAT (New South Wales)		ADE (South Australia)		Pen.	Points
1	(Australia) Jobe Stewart	999	1	2	1	**2**	2	2	1	1	2	2	**4**	**2**	0	1686
2	(Australia) Jett Johnson	117	3	4	4	3	4	3	4	2	5	5	3	5	0	1476
3	(Australia) Cameron McLeod	92	**5**	**1**	**2**	1	**1**	**1**	**Ret**	**Ret**	**1**	**1**	1	1	0	1449
4	(Australia) Mason Kelly	22	6	5	3	5	Ret	DNS	2	5	3	3	Ret	3	0	1089
5	(Australia) Ryan Gilroy	89	4	3	6	Ret	3	Ret	5	4	DNS	DNS			0	702
6	(Australia) Valentino Astuti	3							3	3	4	4			0	498
7	(New Zealand) Matthew McCutcheon	97	2	6	5	4									0	471
8	(Australia) Chris Smerdon	39	7	7	7	6	Ret	Ret							0	390
9	(Australia) Jason Gomersall	35	8	8	8	7									0	366
10	(Australia) Rylan Gray	55											2	4	0	258
	(Australia) Jim Pollicina	7	Ret	DNS											0	0
Pos.	Driver	No.	NEW (New South Wales)		BAR (Western Australia)		TOW (Queensland)		SAN (Victoria (state))		BAT (New South Wales)		ADE (South Australia)		Pen.	Points

Key
Colour	Result
Gold	Winner
Silver	Second place
Bronze	Third place
Green	Other points position
Blue	Other classified position
Blue	Not classified, finished (NC)
Purple	Not classified, retired (Ret)
Red	Did not qualify (DNQ)
Red	Did not pre-qualify (DNPQ)
Black	Disqualified (DSQ)
White	Did not start (DNS)
White	Race cancelled (C)
Blank	Did not practice (DNP)
Blank	Excluded (EX)
Blank	Did not arrive (DNA)
Blank	Withdrawn (WD)
Blank	Did not enter (cell empty)
Text formatting	Meaning
**Bold**	Pole position
Italics	Fastest lap
