= Nash Morris =

Australian racing driver

- Nationality: Australian
- Born: 14 May 2003 (age 23) Gold Coast, Queensland, Australia
- Relatives: Paul Morris (father)

Super2 Series career
- Debut season: 2022
- Current team: Tickford Racing
- Car number: 55
- Starts: 39
- Championships: 0
- Wins: 1
- Podiums: 4
- Poles: 0
- Fastest laps: 0
- Best finish: 3rd in 2025

Previous series
- 2021 2021 2019–2021 2020: Super3 Series; Boost Mobile Super Trucks; Track Attack Excel Cup; Toyota 86 Racing Series

Championship titles
- 2021: Super3 Series

Nash Morris (born 14 May 2003) is an Australian racing driver. Nicknamed "the Flash", he is the son of former Supercars Championship driver Paul Morris, and drives for Tickford Autosport in the Super2 Series. He won the Super3 Series in 2021.

Morris has also raced in the Toyota 86 Racing Series, TA2 Racing Australia Muscle Car Series, Track Attack Excel Cup, and Boost Mobile Super Trucks.

== Career results ==
Season	Series	Position	Vehicle	Team
2019	Queensland Excel Cup	30th	Hyundai X3 Excel	Norwell Motorplex
2019	Toyota 86 Racing Series Australia	54th	Toyota 86	Paul Morris Motorsport
2020	EFS 4x4 Accessories Excel Invitational	4th	Hyundai X3 Excel	MotorsportSales.com.au
2020	Queensland Production Car Championship	58th	Toyota 86	Paul Morris Motorsport
2021	Track Attack Excel Cup 175	**1st**	Hyundai X3 Excel	Norwell Motorplex
2021	Super3 Series	**1st**	Ford FG Falcon	Paul Morris Motorsport
2021	Boost Mobile Super Trucks	7th	Stadium Super Truck	Boost Mobile
2022	Super2 Series	17th	Ford FG X Falcon	Paul Morris Motorsport
2022	Trans Am Series	17th	Ford Mustang	Paul Morris Motorsport
2022	TA2 Muscle Car Series	15th	Ford Mustang	Paul Morris Motorsport
2022	GT World Challenge Australia - GT4		Mercedes-AMG GT4	Team Nineteen
2023	Super2 Series	17th	Holden Commodore ZB	World Gym NEMO Racing
2023	Trans Am Series	11th	Ford Mustang	Supercheap Auto Racing
2023	TA2 Muscle Car Series	19th	Ford Mustang	Paul Morris Motorsport
2023	GT4 Australia Series	6th	Mercedes-AMG GT4	Team Nineteen
2023	Porsche Sprint Challenge Australia		Porsche 911 GT3 Cup	TekworkX Motorsport
2024	Porsche Carrera Cup Australia	8th	Porsche 911 GT3 Cup	Scott Taylor Motorsport
2024	Trans Am Series	8th	Ford Mustang	Supercheap Auto Racing
2024	Porsche Sprint Challenge Australia		Porsche 911 GT3 Cup	Scott Taylor Motorsport
2024	GT4 Australia Series		Mercedes-AMG GT4	Team Nineteen
2025	Super2 Series	**3rd**	Ford Mustang GT	Tickford Autosport

=== Boost Mobile Super Trucks ===
(key) (Bold – Pole position. Italics – Fastest qualifier. * – Most laps led.)

Boost Mobile Super Trucks results
Year	1	2	3	4	5	6	7	8	9	BMSTC	Pts	Ref
2021	SYM; R1; DNS	SYM; R2; Rpl†	SYM; R3; Rpl†	HID; R4; 5	HID; R5; 8	HID; R6; 2	TOW; R7	TOW; R8	TOW; R9	7th	39	
† – Replaced by Russell Ingall due to injury, points went to Morris

=== Super3 Series results ===
(key) (Race results only)

Year	Team	No.	Car	1	2	3	4	5	6	7	8	9	10	Position	Points
2021	Paul Morris Motorsport	67	Ford FG Falcon	BAT; R1; 3	BAT; R2; 8	TOW; R3; 2	**TOW**; **R4**; 1	**TOW2**; **R5**; 1	**TOW2**; **R6**; 2	**SMP**; **R7**; 1	**SMP**; **R8**; C	BAT; R9; 1	BAT; R10; 3	1st	1218

=== Super2 Series results ===
(key) (Race results only)

Year	Team	No.	Car	1	2	3	4	5	6	7	8	9	10	11	12	Position	Points
2022	Paul Morris Motorsport	67	Ford FG X Falcon	SMP; R1; Ret	SMP; R2; Ret	BAR; R3; Ret	BAR; R4; Ret	TOW; R5; 14	TOW; R6; Ret	SAN; R7; 13	SAN; R8; 10	BAT; R9; 14	BAT; R10; C	ADE; R11; 9	ADE; R12; 10	17th	438
2023	Paul Morris Motorsport	67	Holden ZB Commodore	NEW; R1; Ret	NEW; R2; 11	BAR; R3; 11	BAR; R4; 14	TOW; R5; 11	TOW; R6; 15	SAN; R7; 20	SAN; R8; 9	BAT; R9; 12	BAT; R10; Ret	ADE; R11; 8	ADE; R12; Ret	17th	627
2025	Tickford Racing	222	Ford Mustang S550	SYD; R1; 4	SYD; R2; 10	SYM; R3; 7	SYM; R4; 1	TOW; R5; 4	TOW; R6; 7	QLD; R7; 7	QLD; R8; 2	BAT; R9; 5	BAT; R10; 2	ADE; R11; 9	ADE; R12; 9	3rd	1311

=== Supercars Championship results ===
Supercars results
Year	Team	No.	Car	1	2	3	4	5	6	7	8	9	10	11	12	13	14	15	16	17	18	19	20	21	22	23	24	25	26	27	28	29	30	31	32	33	34	35	36	37	Position	Points
2025	PremiAir Racing	62	Chevrolet Camaro ZL1	SYD; R1	SYD; R2	SYD; R3	MEL; R4	MEL; R5	MEL; R6	MEL; R7	TAU; R8	TAU; R9	TAU; R10	SYM; R11	SYM; R12	SYM; R13	BAR; R14	BAR; R15	BAR; R16	HID; R17	HID; R18	HID; R19	TOW; R20	TOW; R21	TOW; R22	QLD; R23	QLD; R24	QLD; R25	BEN; R26; 23	BAT; R27; Ret	SUR; R28	SUR; R29	SAN; R30	SAN; R31	ADE; R32	ADE; R33	ADE; R34				51st*	48*
2026	PremiAir Racing	777	Chevrolet Camaro ZL1	SMP; R1	SMP; R2	SMP; R3	MEL; R4	MEL; R5	MEL; R6	MEL; R7	TAU; R8	TAU; R9	TAU; R10	CHR; R11	CHR; R12	CHR; R13	SYM; R14	SYM; R15	SYM; R16	BAR; R17	BAR; R18	BAR; R19	HID; R20	HID; R21	HID; R22	TOW; R23	TOW; R24	TOW; R25	QLD; R26	QLD; R27	QLD; R28	BEN; R29	BAT; R30	SUR; R31	SUR; R32	SAN; R33	SAN; R34	ADE; R35	ADE; R36	ADE; R37		
