= Anderson Motorsport =

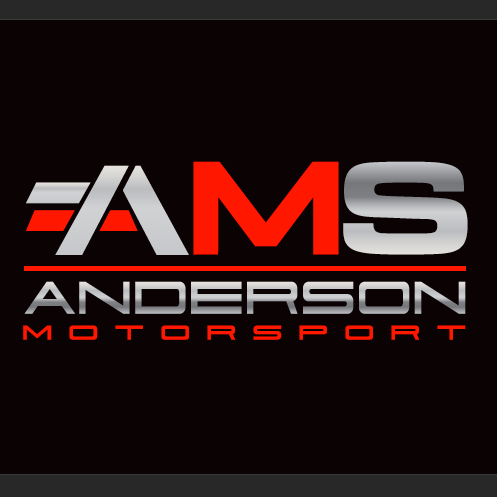
- Manufacturer: Ford
- Team Principal: Michael Anderson
- Race Drivers: 17. Ryan Tomsett; 78. Zak Best
- Chassis: Mustang GT
- Drivers' Championships: 0
- Teams' Championships: 0
- Round wins: 0
- Race wins: 0
- 2nd position: 0
- 6th

Anderson Motorsport is a Supercars team currently competing in the Super2 Series. The team was started by owner and team principal Michael Anderson to further his own racing career.

== Super 2 Series ==
The team was set to debut in the 2020 Dunlop Super 2 Series at the second round at Symmons Plains. However, due to the industry shutdown as a consequence of the 2020 Coronavirus Pandemic, They debuted with driver Tyler Everingham at the new second round at Sydney Motorsport Park. Everingham would finish 5th and 11th respectively in the 2 races. The team would not enter the Bathurst round of the series with Everingham, due to this, he would finish 14th in the championship having only competed in one round.

== Kumho Tyre Series ==
The teams racing debut was in the 2016 Kumho Tyres Australian V8 Touring Car Series with a BF Falcon for owner Michael Anderson, entered under the name of sponsor Kenwood Homes. Anderson had a solid debut season, taking 1 podium and finishing 7th overall in the championship. Anderson would have a breakout year in 2017, upgrading to a FG Falcon he would win 1 race, take 6 other podiums, as well as a pole position in the first race of the season at Phillip Island, he would finish 3rd in the championship. Anderson's 2018 season was disappointing by comparison, He didn't take a podium all year, finishing 6th in the standings.

For 2019, Anderson would transfer to an ownership role, tabbing 2018 Australian Formula 4 Championship winner, Jayden Ojeda to drive the teams FG Falcon. Ojeda would have an outstanding rookie season, winning 4 races in a season long battle with fellow rookie Broc Feeney. Ojeda would ultimately finish second to Feeney by the end of the season.

For the shortened 2020 Super 3 Series, the team would enter debutant Declan Fraser. Fraser would take 3 podiums on the season, as well as pole position for the second race at Bathurst.

== Super2 Results ==
=== Car No. 17 results ===
Year	Driver	No.	Make	1	2	3	4	5	6	7	8	9	10	11	12	Position	Pts
2020	Tyler Everingham	7	Holden VF Commodore	ADE; R1	ADE; R2	ADE; R3	SYD; R4; 5	SYD; R5; 11	BAT; R6	BAT; R7						14th	183
2023	Zak Best	17	Ford Mustang GT	NEW; R1; 3	NEW; R2; 1	BAR; R3; 3	BAR; R4; 7	TOW; R5; 9	TOW; R6; 1	SAN; R7; 2	SAN; R8; 12	BAT; R9; 2	BAT; R10; 2	ADE; R11; 13	ADE; R12; 2	2nd	1431
2024	Max Vidau	17	Ford Mustang GT	BAT1; R1; 10	BAT1; R2; 7	BAR; R3; 11	BAR; R4; 2	TOW; R5; 3	TOW; R6; 9	SAN; R7; 9	SAN; R8; 13	BAT2; R9; 2	BAT2; R10; 6	ADE; R11; Ret	ADE; R12; 9	6th	1071
2025	Ryan Tomsett	17	Ford Mustang GT	SYD; R1; 21	SYD; R2; 17	SYM; R3; 19	SYM; R4; Ret	TOW; R5; 15	TOW; R6; 19	QLD; R7; 18	QLD; R8; 11	BAT; R9; 19	BAT; R10; Ret	ADE; R11; 15	ADE; R12; 16	19th	543

== Super3 Results ==
=== Car No. 11 results ===
Year	Driver	No.	Make	1	2	3	4	5	6	7	8	9	10	11	12	13	14	15	16	17	18	19	20	21	22	23	24	25	26	27	28	29	30	Position	Pts
2016	Michael Anderson	11	Ford BF Falcon	SAN	SAN	SAN	WIN	WIN	WIN	QLD	QLD	QLD	PHI	PHI	PHI	SMP	SMP	SMP																7th	277
2017	Michael Anderson	11	Ford FG Falcon	PHI	PHI	PHI	WIN	WIN	WIN	QLD	QLD	QLD	PHI	PHI	PHI	SMP	SMP	SMP																3rd	444
2018	Michael Anderson	11	Ford FG Falcon	ADE; R1; Ret	ADE; R2; DNS	ADE; R3; DNS	SYM; R4; 10	SYM; R5; 12	SYM; R6; 8	BAR; R7; 6	BAR; R8; 2	BAR; R9; 6	TOW; R10; 4	TOW; R11; 20	SAN; R12; 3	SAN; R13; 8	BAT; R14; 8	NEW; R15; Ret	NEW; R16; C															11th	915
2019	Jayden Ojeda	11	Ford FG Falcon	ADE; R1; Ret	ADE; R2; 9	ADE; R3; 4	BAR; R4; 5	BAR; R5; 7	TOW; R6; 13	TOW; R7; 15	QLD; R8; 1	QLD; R9; 2	BAT; R10; 1	SAN; R11; 11	SAN; R12; Ret	NEW; R13; 2	NEW; R14; 3																	3rd	1396
2021	Michael Anderson	5	Ford FG Falcon	BAT; R1; 6	BAT; R2; 1	TOW1; R3; 1	TOW1; R4; 2	TOW2; R5; 2	TOW2; R6; Ret	SMP; R7; 3	SMP; R8; C	BAT; R9; 4	BAT; R10; 4																					2nd	1047
2022	Brad Vaughan	5	Ford FG Falcon	SMP; R1; 1	SMP; R2; 2	WAN; R3; 8	WAN; R4; 2	TOW; R5; 1	TOW; R6; 7	SAN; R7; 2	SAN; R8; 1	BAT; R9; 2	BAT; R10; C	ADE; R11; 1	ADE; R12; 1																			1st	1488

== Stats ==
Year	Driver	Race Starts	Race Wins	Podiums
2020	(Australia) Tyler Everingham	2	0	0
2023, 2026	(Australia) Zak Best	18	2	8
2024	(Australia) Max Vidau	12	0	3
2025–2026	(Australia) Ryan Tomsett	20	0	2
2025	(New Zealand) Ayrton Hodson	12	0	0
2026	(Australia) Jonathon Webb	2	0	0

=== Super2 Drivers ===
The following is a list of drivers who have driven for the team in Super2 Series, in order of their first appearance. Drivers who only drove for the team on a part-time basis are listed in italics.

- (Australia) Tyler Everingham (2020)
- (Australia) Zak Best (2023, 2026)
- (Australia) Max Vidau (2024)
- (Australia) Ryan Tomsett (2025–present)
- (New Zealand) Ayrton Hodson (2025)
- (Australia) Jonathon Webb (2026)
