= Zak Best =

Australian racing car driver (born 2001)

- Nationality: Australian
- Born: Zakkary Thomas Joseph Best; October 11, 2001 (age 25) Benalla, Victoria

Super2 Series career
- Debut season: 2020
- Current team: Anderson Motorsport
- Car number: 78
- Starts: 43
- Wins: 5
- Podiums: 18
- Poles: 7
- Best finish: 2nd in 2023

Zakkary Thomas Joseph Best (born 11 October 2001) is an Australian racing car driver. He currently competes in the Dunlop Super2 Series in the No. 78 Ford Mustang GT, with wins, podiums and poles to his name in the Super2 Series. He also raced in the 2025 Bathurst 1000, finishing in ninth.

== Career ==
=== Early career ===
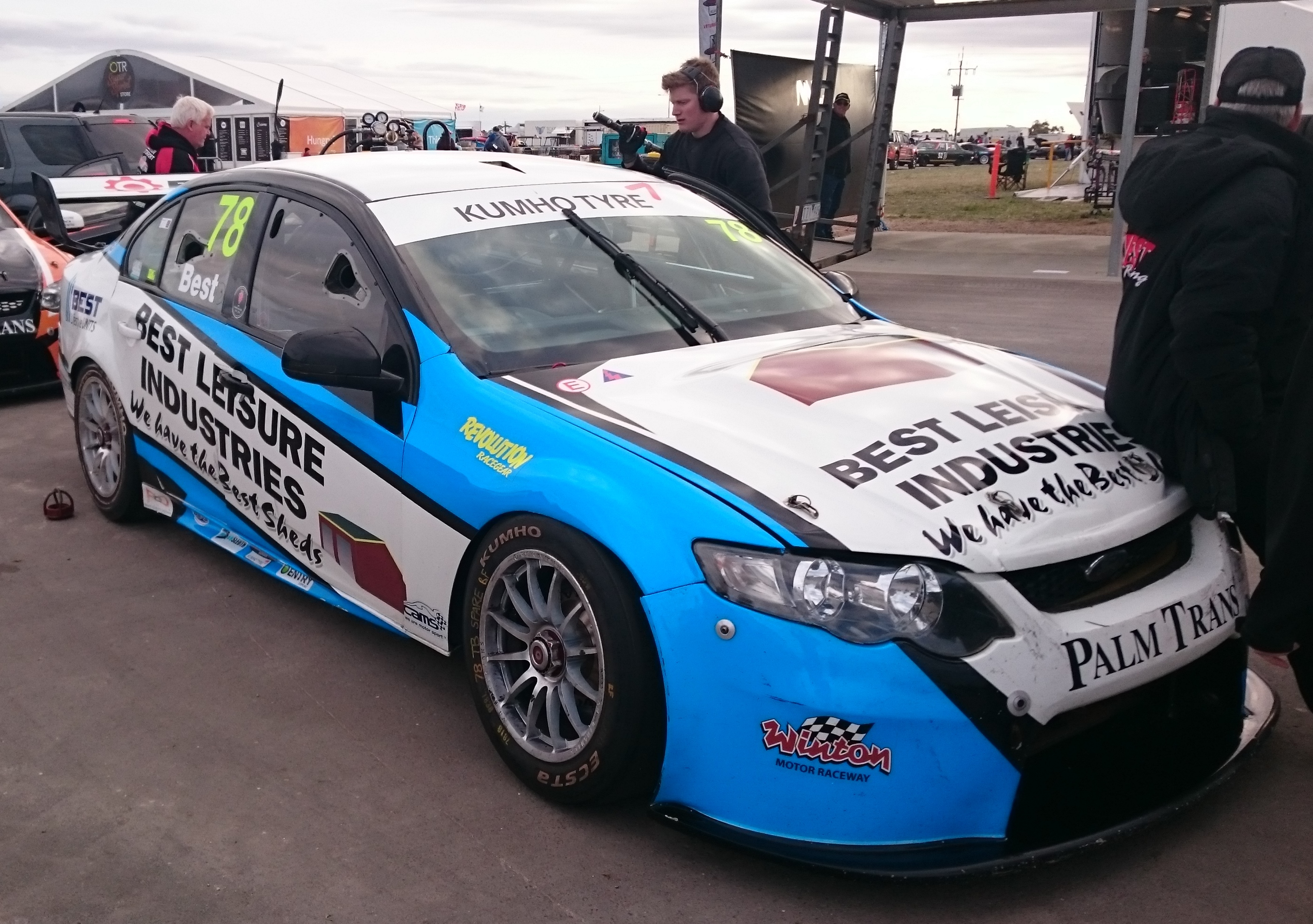
Best placed second in the 2018 Kumho Tyre Australian V8 Touring Car Series driving a Ford Falcon FG

Starting in Aussie Racing Cars 2016 at the age of fourteen, Best was the youngest ever to compete and win a race (Phillip Island) and runner up Rookie, in an Aussie Racing Car.

Best then went to the CAMS Jayco Australian Formula 4 Championship 2017 finished tenth. Khumo V8 Supercars 2018, drove Ford FG with MW Motorsport finished Runner Up. Khumo Tyres Super3 2019, drove Ford FG with MW Motorsport finished fourt.

Best made his debut in the V8 Touring Car Series (now known as the Super3 Series) in 2018, finishing second in the opening round at Phillip Island behind defending champion Jack Smith and ahead of MW Motorsport teammate Tyler Everingham. Best would finish the season in second place behind Everingham.

Despite hopes to join the Super2 Series in 2019, Best continued in the Super3 series. Despite winning several races Best was only fourth in the series, which team owner Matthew White blamed on engine issues at the Winton round.

=== Super2 ===
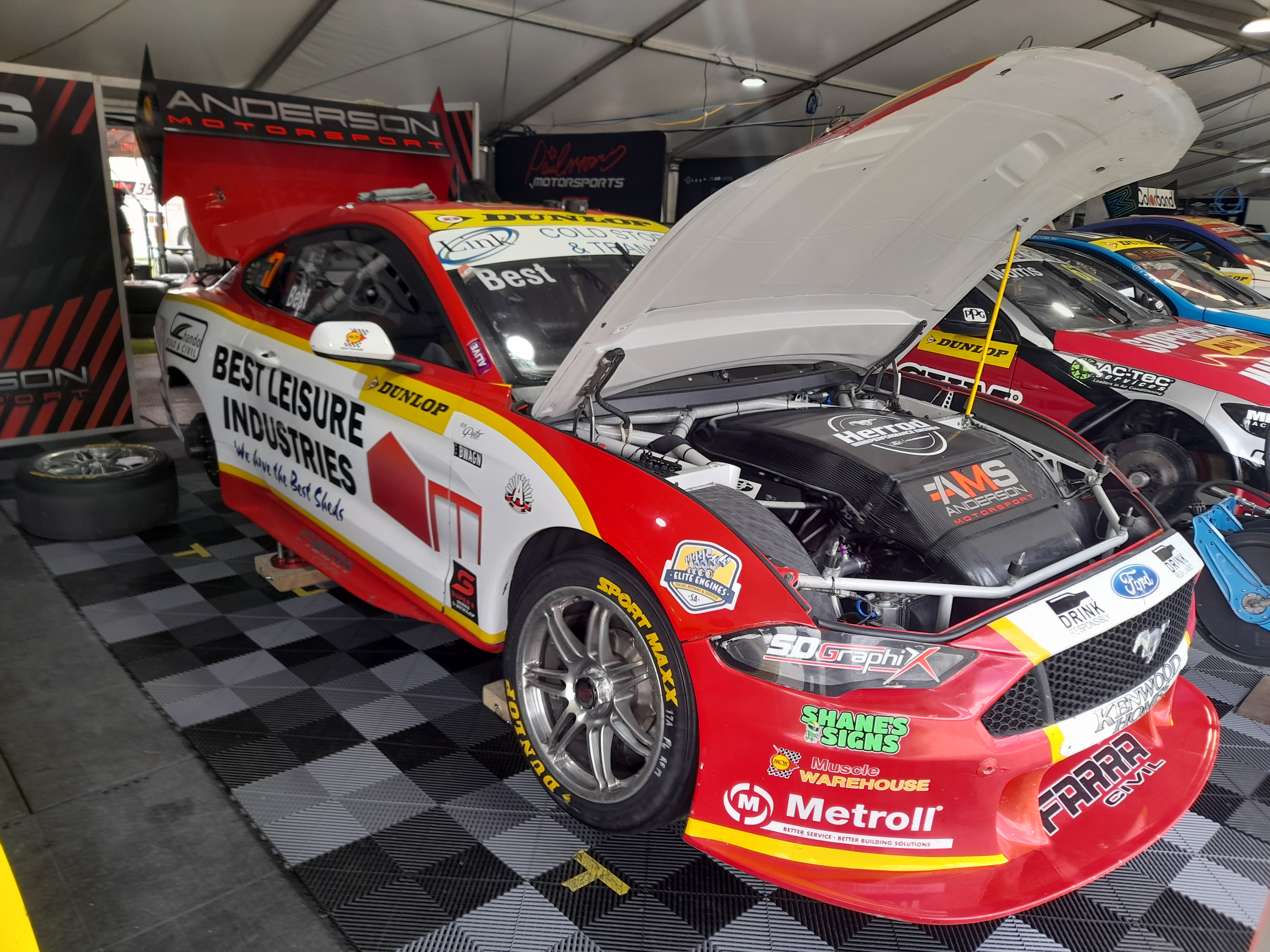
Best placed second in the 2023 Dunlop Super2 Series driving a Ford Mustang GT

For 2020, Best moved up to the Super2 Series, still driving for MW Motorsport. He qualified in third place on debut at the Adelaide Parklands Circuit, and achieved a best finish of fifth place in the final round at Bathurst.

Best switched to Tickford Racing for 2021, finishing the series in second place behind Broc Feeney. He remained with Tickford for the 2022 series. He finished runner up again in his 2022 campaign.

Best announced for his 2023 Super2 campaign that he would be making the switch to Anderson Motorsport driving an ex-Dick Johnson Racing Ford Mustang GT. He would join Tickford Racing for the endurance events.

=== Supercars ===
Best made his Supercars Championship and Bathurst 1000 debut in 2021 driving with his Super2 team Tickford Racing. He partnered regular driver Jack Le Brocq in his Ford Mustang GT for the 2021 Bathurst 1000. He was given a late call-up due to Alexandre Prémat being unable to make the trip to Australia. The pair qualified in eighth place were only able to finish in fifteenth place, in part due to double stacking in the pits. Best was described by team principal Tim Edwards as being one of the best co-drivers in that year's race.

For 2022, Tickford announced that they would enter Best in Supercars rounds at Hidden Valley and The Bend as a wildcard. In Sunday qualifying, Best crashed, forcing him to start from the back on the grid in the final two races. In the second of these, Best was involved in a collision with Garry Jacobson, causing Best to retire, with Best highly critical of the driving standards of the drivers towards the rear of the field.

On July 30, 2022, Best became the youngest and first Supercars Championship wildcard entrant to claim a pole position, which was done at the 2022 The Bend SuperSprint. Best finished race 21 in fifth, becoming the highest finishing placed wildcard entrant.

== Career results ==
Season	Series	Position	Car	Team
2016	Aussie Racing Cars	12th	ARC Euro GT	Zak Best
2017	Australian Formula 4 Championship	10th	Mygale M14-F4	AGI Sport
2018	Kumho Tyre Australian V8 Touring Car Series	**2nd**	Ford FG Falcon	MW Motorsport
2019	Super3 Series	4th	Ford FG Falcon	MW Motorsport
2019	MRF Tyres Australian Production Car Series	15th †	Mitsubishi Lancer RS Evolution IX	
2020	Dunlop Super2 Series	6th	Nissan Altima L33	MW Motorsport
2021	Dunlop Super2 Series	**2nd**	Ford FG X Falcon	Tickford Racing
2021	Supercars Championship	39th	Ford Mustang S550	Tickford Racing
2022	Dunlop Super2 Series	**2nd**	Ford FG X Falcon	Tickford Racing
2022	Supercars Championship	39th	Ford Mustang S550	Tickford Racing
2023	Dunlop Super2 Series	**2nd**	Ford Mustang S550	Anderson Motorsport
2023	Supercars Championship	32nd	Ford Mustang GT	Tickford Racing
2024	Porsche Carrera Cup Australia	21st	Porsche 911 GT3 Cup (992)	EMA Motorsport
2025	Repco Supercars Championship	51st*	Ford Mustang GT	Blanchard Racing Team

† Canceled due to COVID-19

=== Complete Australian Formula 4 Championship results ===
(key) (Races in bold indicate pole position) (Races in italics indicate fastest lap)

Year	Team	1	2	3	4	5	6	7	8	9	10	11	12	13	14	15	16	17	18	19	20	21	DC	Points
2017	AGI Sport	SAN1; 1; 8	SAN1; 2 Ret	SAN1; 3; 11	SAN2; 1; 5	SAN2; 2; 4	SAN2; 3 Ret	BAR; 1; 13	BAR; 2; 10	BAR; 3; 10	PHI; 1; 9	PHI; 2; 9	PHI; 3; 6	QLD; 1; 6	QLD; 2; 6	QLD; 3; 10	SYD; 1; 8	SYD; 2; 7	SYD; 3; 7	SUR; 1; 9	SUR; 2; 6	SUR; 3; 11	10th	83

=== Super3 Series results ===
(key) (Race results only)

Super3 Series results
Year	Team	No.	Car	1	2	3	4	5	6	7	8	9	10	11	12	13	14	15	Position	Points
2018	MW Motorsport	78	Ford FG Falcon	PHI; R1; 4	PHI; R2; 1	PHI; R3; 2	WIN; R4; 2	WIN; R5; 4	WIN; R6; 3	SMP; R7; 2	SMP; R8; 2	SMP; R9; 2	**QLD**; **R10**; 2	QLD; R11; 2	QLD; R12; 1	**BEN**; **R13**; 3	BEN; R14; 2	BEN; R15; 3	2nd	601
2019	MW Motorsport	78	Ford FG Falcon	PHI; R1; 3	PHI; R2; 1	**PHI**; **R3**; 3	WIN; R4; 1	**WIN**; **R5**; 1	**WIN**; **R6**; Ret	**QLD**; **R7**; 1	**QLD**; **R8**; 1	**QLD**; **R9**; Ret	BEN; R10; 16	BEN; R11; 4	BEN; R12; 1	SAN; R13; 4	SAN; R14; 9	SAN; R15; 4	4th	454

=== Super2 Series results ===
(key) (Race results only)

Super2 Series results
Year	Team	No.	Car	1	2	3	4	5	6	7	8	9	10	11	12	Position	Points
2020	MW Motorsport	78	Nissan Altima L33	ADE; R1; 8	ADE; R2; 8	ADE; R3; 11	SYD; R4; 11	SYD; R5; 7	BAT; R6; 6	BAT; R7; 5						6th	549
2021	Tickford Racing	78	Ford FG X Falcon	BAT; R1; 4	BAT; R2; 2	TOW1; R3; 4	TOW1; R4; 4	TOW2; R5; 3	**TOW2**; **R6**; **1**	SMP; R7; 15	SMP; R8; C	BAT; R9; 4	BAT; R10; 4			2nd	1077
2022	Tickford Racing	78	Ford FG X Falcon	SMP; R1; 2	SMP; R2; 1	WAN; R3; Ret	WAN; R4; 7	**TOW**; **R5**; **2**	TOW; R6; 12	SAN; R7; 2	SAN; R8; 3	**BAT**; **R9**; **1**	BAT; R10; C	ADE; R11; 4	ADE; R12; 3	2nd	1257
2023	Anderson Motorsport	17	Ford Mustang S550	NEW; R1; 3	NEW; R2; 1	**WAN**; **R3**; **3**	WAN; R4; 7	TOW; R5; 8	TOW; R6; 1	SAN; R7; 2	SAN; R8; 12	**BAT**; **R9**; **2**	**BAT**; **R10**; **2**	ADE; R11; 13	ADE; R12; 2	2nd	1431

=== Supercars Championship results ===
(key) (Races in bold indicate pole position) (Races in italics indicate fastest lap)

Supercars results
Year	Team	No.	Car	1	2	3	4	5	6	7	8	9	10	11	12	13	14	15	16	17	18	19	20	21	22	23	24	25	26	27	28	29	30	31	32	33	34	Position	Points
2021	Tickford Racing	5	Ford Mustang S550	BAT1; R1	BAT1; R2	SAN; R3	SAN; R4	SAN; R5	SYM; R6	SYM; R7	SYM; R8	BEN; R9	BEN; R10	BEN; R11	HID; R12	HID; R13	HID; R14	TOW1; R15	TOW1; R16	TOW2; R17	TOW2; R18	TOW2; R19	SMP1; R20	SMP1; R21	SMP1; R22	SMP2; R23	SMP2; R24	SMP2; R25	SMP3; R26	SMP3; R27	SMP3; R28	SMP4; R29; PO	SMP4; R30; PO	BAT2; R31; 15				39th	120
2022	Tickford Racing	78	Ford Mustang S550	SMP; R1	SMP; R2	SYM; R3	SYM; R4	SYM; R5	MEL; R6	MEL; R7	MEL; R8	MEL; R9	BAR; R10	BAR; R11	BAR; R12	WIN; R13	WIN; R14	WIN; R15	HID; R16; 21	HID; R17; 21	HID; R18; Ret	TOW; R19	TOW; R20	**BEN**; **R21**; **5**	BEN; R22; 19	BEN; R23; Ret												39th	162
2022	Tickford Racing	55	Ford Mustang S550																								SAN; R24; PO	SAN; R25; PO	SAN; R26; PO	PUK; R27	PUK; R28	PUK; R29	BAT; R30; Ret	SUR; R31	SUR; R32	ADE; R33	ADE; R34	39th	162
2023	Tickford Racing	5	Ford Mustang S650	NEW; R1	NEW; R2	MEL; R3	MEL; R4	MEL; R5	MEL; R6	BAR; R7	BAR; R8	BAR; R9	SYM; R10	SYM; R11	SYM; R12	HID; R13	HID; R14	HID; R15	TOW; R16	TOW; R17	SMP; R18	SMP; R19	BEN; R20	BEN; R21	BEN; R22	SAN; R23; 12	BAT; R24; 6	SUR; R25	SUR; R26	ADE; R27	ADE; R28							32nd	342
2025	Blanchard Racing Team	3	Ford Mustang S650	SYD; R1	SYD; R2	SYD; R3	MEL; R4	MEL; R5	MEL; R6	MEL; R7	TAU; R8	TAU; R9	TAU; R10	SYM; R11	SYM; R12	SYM; R13	BAR; R14	BAR; R15	BAR; R16	HID; R17	HID; R18	HID; R19	TOW; R20	TOW; R21	TOW; R22	QLD; R23	QLD; R24	QLD; R25	BEN; R26; 24	BAT; R27; 9	SUR; R28	SUR; R29	SAN; R30	SAN; R31	ADE; R32	ADE; R33	ADE; R34	52nd*	44*

=== Complete Bathurst 1000 results ===
Year	Team	Car	Co-driver	Position	Laps
2021	Tickford Racing	Ford Mustang S550	(Australia) Jack Le Brocq	15th	161
2022	Tickford Racing	Ford Mustang S550	(Australia) Thomas Randle	DNF	0
2023	Tickford Racing	Ford Mustang S650	(Australia) James Courtney	6th	161
2025	Blanchard Racing Team	Ford Mustang S650	(Australia) Aaron Cameron	9th	161
2026	Blanchard Racing Team	Ford Mustang S650	(Australia) Aaron Cameron	13th	161
