= 2020 Super2 Series =

Motor racing competition

The 2020 Super2 Series was an Australian motor racing competition for Supercars, which was staged as a support series to the 2020 Supercars Championship. It was the twenty-first running of the Supercars Development Series, the second tier of competition in Supercars racing.

== Entries ==
The following teams and drivers competed in the 2020 championship:

Manufacturer	Model	Team	No.	Driver name	Class	Rounds	Ref.
Ford	FG X Falcon	Tickford Racing	5	(Australia) Broc Feeney	R	All	
Ford	FG X Falcon	Matt Chahda Motorsport	17	(Australia) Matt McLean	R	3	
Ford	FG X Falcon	Matt Chahda Motorsport	18	(Australia) Matt Chahda		All	
Holden	Commodore VF	Anderson Motorsport	7	(Australia) Tyler Everingham		2	
Holden	Commodore VF	Triple Eight Race Engineering	10	(Australia) Angelo Mouzouris	R	All	
Holden	Commodore VF	Brema Group Racing	11	(Australia) Zane Morse	R	All	
Holden	Commodore VF	Brad Jones Racing	14	(Australia) Josh Fife	R	All	
Holden	Commodore VF	Eggleston Motorsport	38	(Australia) Brodie Kostecki		1–2	
Holden	Commodore VF	Eggleston Motorsport	54	(Australia) Jack Perkins		1–2	
Holden	Commodore VF	Image Racing	49	(Australia) Jordan Boys		All	
Holden	Commodore VF	Image Racing	999	(Australia) Will Brown		All	
Holden	Commodore VF	Kostecki Brothers Racing	55	(Australia) Kurt Kostecki		1	
Nissan	Altima L33	MW Motorsport	16	(Australia) Thomas Randle		All	
Nissan	Altima L33	MW Motorsport	31	(Australia) Jayden Ojeda	R	All	
Nissan	Altima L33	MW Motorsport	78	(Australia) Zak Best	R	All	

Icon	Class
R	Rookie driver

- R – Eligible for the A$100,000 'rookie class' prize pool.

=== Team changes ===
- Brema Group Racing made its début in the series, acquiring an ex-Lucas Dumbrell Motorsport VF Commodore.
- Anderson Motorsport made their début in the series, acquiring an ex-Walkinshaw Andretti United VF Commodore.
- Eggleston Motorsport scaled back their commitment to the series from three cars to two.
- Triple Eight Race Engineering scaled back its commitment to the series from two cars to one.
- Kostecki Brothers Racing returned to the series after withdrawing from final three rounds in 2019.
- Matt Chahda Motorsport expanded its operations to enter a second car at the Bathurst round.
- Garry Rogers Motorsport withdrew from the series after withdrawing from the Supercars Championship, while Matt Stone Racing withdrew from the series to focus on the Supercars Championship.

=== Driver changes ===
- Will Brown moved from Eggleston Motorsport to Image Racing. The team is supported by Erebus Motorsport and Brown is expected to be promoted to Erebus' Supercars Championship in 2021.
- Thomas Randle moved from Tickford Racing to MW Motorsport.
- Tyler Everingham moved from MW Motorsport to Anderson Motorsport. He missed the first round due to an incident in the Bathurst 12 Hour.
- Kurt Kostecki returned to Kostecki Brothers Racing after spending a single year with Triple Eight Race Engineering.
- Brodie Kostecki returned to the series with Eggleston Motorsport, after withdrawing from the last four rounds in 2019.
- 2019 Super 3 Series winner Broc Feeney graduated to the series with Tickford Racing.
- Super3 Series drivers Zak Best & Jayden Ojeda Graduated to the series with MW Motorsport.
- Josh Fife graduated to the series with Brad Jones Racing.
- Reigning Australian Formula Ford champion Angelo Mouzouris joined the series with Triple Eight Race Engineering.
- Toyota 86 Series driver Zane Morse joined the series with Brema Group Racing.
- Matt McLean made his series debut at Bathurst with Matt Chahda Motorsport
- Bryce Fullwood Graduated to the Supercars Championship with Walkinshaw Andretti United
- Jack Smith graduated to the Supercars Championship with Brad Jones Racing
- Jake Kostecki and Zane Goddard graduated to the Supercars Championship, sharing the Matt Stone Racing Superlite entry.
- Brenton Grove and Adam Marjoram will not drive in the series in 2020.

== Calendar ==
The calendar for the 2020 championship was expected to consist of five rounds, but only three were run as the COVID-19 pandemic disrupted the running of the championship.

Round	Event name	Circuit	Location	Date
1	Adelaide 500	(South Australia) Adelaide Street Circuit	Adelaide, South Australia	21–23 February
2	Sydney SuperSprint	(New South Wales) Sydney Motorsport Park	Eastern Creek, New South Wales	18–19 July
3	Bathurst 1000	(New South Wales) Mount Panorama Circuit	Bathurst, New South Wales	16–17 October

=== Calendar changes ===
- The original calendar removed the Ipswich, Newcastle and Perth rounds with Sydney Motorsport Park and Symmons Plains reinstated, having last being in the series in 2017 and 2018 respectively. Due to the COVID-19 pandemic, a revised calendar resulted in the Symmons Plains and The Bend Motorsport Park rounds being cancelled.
- The Bathurst 250 km race was split into two races of 125 km. The change was made as the mandatory refuelling in pit stops proved to be problematic in 2019.

== Rule changes ==
=== Sporting regulations ===
The series was to have seen an increase in the prize money awarded, with the champion to be given $400,000 as a way to secure funding into the Supercars Championship. A "Rookie" class aimed at drivers under the age of 25 was planned, with the winner to be awarded $100,000 to secure a second year in the series. This was done to help young drivers into the Supercars Championship as part of the Junior Development Program. As a result the COVID-19 pandemic, both were shelved.

== Results and standings ==
=== Season summary ===
Round	Event	Pole position	Fastest lap	Winning driver	Winning team	Round Winner
1	(South Australia) Adelaide 500	(Australia) Thomas Randle	(Australia) Brodie Kostecki	(Australia) Brodie Kostecki	Eggleston Motorsport	(Australia) Brodie Kostecki
1	(South Australia) Adelaide 500	(Australia) Brodie Kostecki	(Australia) Brodie Kostecki	(Australia) Brodie Kostecki	Eggleston Motorsport	(Australia) Brodie Kostecki
1	(South Australia) Adelaide 500	(Australia) Brodie Kostecki	(Australia) Brodie Kostecki	(Australia) Thomas Randle	MW Motorsport	(Australia) Brodie Kostecki
2	(New South Wales) Sydney SuperSprint	(Australia) Thomas Randle	(Australia) Brodie Kostecki	(Australia) Will Brown	Image Racing	(Australia) Thomas Randle
2	(New South Wales) Sydney SuperSprint	(Australia) Thomas Randle	(Australia) Thomas Randle	(Australia) Thomas Randle	MW Motorsport	(Australia) Thomas Randle
3	(New South Wales) Bathurst 1000	(Australia) Will Brown	(Australia) Thomas Randle	(Australia) Will Brown	Image Racing	(Australia) Thomas Randle
3	(New South Wales) Bathurst 1000	(Australia) Will Brown	(Australia) Thomas Randle	(Australia) Thomas Randle	MW Motorsport	(Australia) Thomas Randle

=== Points system ===
Points were awarded in each race as follows.

Round format	Position												
Round format	1st	2nd	3rd	4th	5th	6th	7th	8th	9th	10th	11th	12th	13th
Three races	100	92	86	80	74	68	64	60	56	52	48	46	44
Two races	150	138	129	120	111	102	96	90	84	78	72	69	66

=== Drivers' championship ===
Pos.	Driver	No.	ADE (South Australia)			SYD (New South Wales)		BAT (New South Wales)		Pen.	Points
1	(Australia) Thomas Randle	16	2	2	1	2	1	2	1	0	860
2	(Australia) Will Brown	999	3	3	2	1	4	1	3	0	813
3	(Australia) Jordan Boys	49	5	6	4	8	9	3	4	0	645
4	(Australia) Jayden Ojeda	31	9	4	5	3	2	Ret	2	0	615
5	(Australia) Matt Chahda	18	7	5	6	12	10	5	6	0	566
6	(Australia) Zak Best	78	8	8	11	11	7	6	5	0	549
7	(Australia) Broc Feeney	5	10	7	7	4	8	4	DNS	0	510
8	(Australia) Brodie Kostecki	38	1	1	3	9	3			0	499
9	(Australia) Angelo Mouzouris	10	12	10	9	6	5	7	DNS	0	463
10	(Australia) Josh Fife	14	11	9	Ret	10	13	8	7	0	434
11	(Australia) Zane Morse	11	13	Ret	10	13	12	9	8	0	405
12	(Australia) Jack Perkins	54	6	Ret	Ret	7	6			30	236
13	(Australia) Kurt Kostecki	55	4	11	8					0	188
14	(Australia) Tyler Everingham	7				5	11			0	183
15	(Australia) Matt McLean	17						10	Ret	0	78
Pos.	Driver	No.	ADE (South Australia)			SYD (New South Wales)		BAT (New South Wales)		Pen.	Points
