= 2022 Super2 Series =

Motor race competition

The 2022 Super2 & Super3 Series was an Australian motor racing competition for Supercars as a support series. It was the twenty-third running of the Supercars Development Series, the second tier of competition in Supercars racing. Since joining as a class in 2021 this also marked at the same time as the fifteenth running of the Super3 Series, the third tier of competition in Supercars racing (Officially in 2019 as the Kumho Tyre Super3 Series).

== Entries ==
=== Classes ===
Name	Regulation	Example Vehicles
Super2	2013 to 2017 V8 Supercars	Holden VF Commodore; Nissan Altima L33; Ford Falcon FG X Mercedes-Benz E63 W212
Super3	post 1993 V8 Supercars	Ford AU Falcon; Ford BA Falcon; Holden Commodore VE; Ford FG Falcon

=== Entry list ===
Manufacturer	Model	Team	No.	Driver name	Class		Rounds	Ref
Manufacturer	Model	Team	No.	Driver name	Car	Driver	Rounds	Ref
Ford	BF Falcon	Auddino Racing	4	(Australia) Tony Auddino	S3		All	
Ford	BF Falcon	TF Racing	17	(Australia) Jason Foley	S3		4	
Ford	FG Falcon	Anderson Motorsport	5	(Australia) Brad Vaughan	S3	R	All	
Ford	FG Falcon	Matt Stone Racing	35/93	(Australia) Jason Gomersall	S3		All	
Ford	FG Falcon	Matt Stone Racing	39	(Australia) Chris Smerdon	S3		1–4, 6	
Ford	FG Falcon	Eggleston Motorsport	24	(Australia) David Murphy	S3		3, 5	
Ford	FG Falcon	Image Racing	28	(New Zealand) Jordan Michels	S3	R	4–5	
Ford	FG Falcon	Beikoff Racing	46	(Australia) Jarred Danaher	S3		1, 3–6	
Ford	AU Falcon	Beikoff Racing	68	(Australia) Shane Beikoff	S3	R	1, 3, 5–6	
Ford	FG X Falcon	Matthew Chahda Motorsport	18	(Australia) Matt Chahda	S2		1–4, 6	
Ford	FG X Falcon	Paul Morris Motorsport	67	(Australia) Nash Morris	S2	R	All	
Ford	FG X Falcon	Tickford Racing	78	(Australia) Zak Best	S2		All	
Ford	BA Falcon	Ray Hislop Motorsport	23	(Australia) Ray Hislop	S3		1, 3–6	
Holden	Commodore VE	Eggleston Motorsport	2	(Australia) Steven Page	S3		All	
Holden	Commodore VE	Eggleston Motorsport	26	(Australia) Kai Allen	S3	R	All	
Holden	Commodore VF	Eggleston Motorsport	38	(Australia) Cameron Crick	S2	R	All	
Holden	Commodore VF	Eggleston Motorsport	50	(Australia) Jack Perkins	S2		4	
Holden	Commodore VF	Eggleston Motorsport	54	(Australia) Matt McLean	S2		1–2, 4–5	
Holden	Commodore VF	Eggleston Motorsport	54	(Australia) Tim Blanchard	S2		3	
Holden	Commodore VF	Brad Jones Racing	8	(Australia) Elly Morrow	S2	R	1–5	
Holden	Commodore VF	Brad Jones Racing	8	(Australia) Lochie Dalton	S2		6	
Holden	Commodore VF	Brema Group Racing	11	(Australia) Zane Morse	S2		All	
Holden	Commodore VF	Matt Stone Racing	30	(Australia) Aaron Seton	S2		All	
Holden	Commodore VF	Matt Stone Racing	58	(Australia) Ryal Harris	S2	R	All	
Holden	Commodore VF	Image Racing	49	(Australia) Jay Hanson	S2	R	All	
Holden	Commodore VF	Image Racing	999	(Australia) Jaylyn Robotham	S2		1–4, 6	
Holden	Commodore VF	Image Racing	999	(Australia) Reef McCarthy	S2		5	
Holden	Commodore VF	Triple Eight Race Engineering	111	(Australia) Cameron Hill	S2	R	All	
Holden	Commodore VF	Triple Eight Race Engineering	777	(Australia) Declan Fraser	S2		All	
Holden	Commodore VE	Pollicina Motorsports	7	(Australia) Jim Pollicina	S3		All	
Holden	Commodore VE	Weldcraft Motorsport	25	(Australia) Paul Boschert	S3		1, 5	
Holden	Commodore VE	Adam Wallis Motorsport	33	(Australia) Adam Wallis	S3		6	
Holden	Commodore VE	Layton Barker Racing	72	(Australia) Layton Barker	S3		3	
Holden	Commodore VE	Strong Motorsport	75	(Australia) Brendan Strong	S3		4–6	
Holden	Commodore VE	Garry Hills Racing	76	(Australia) Garry Hills	S3		1–5	
Holden	Commodore VE	Mr HDT Race Cars	77	(Australia) Blake Fardell	S3		1–4	
Holden	Commodore VE	Gary Collins Racing	96	(Australia) Gary Collins	S3		4–6	
Holden	Commodore VE	Masterton Motorsports	219	(Australia) James Masterton	S3		1, 3–6	
Nissan	Altima L33	MW Motorsport	3	(Australia) Thomas Maxwell	S2	R	All	
Nissan	Altima L33	MW Motorsport	6	(Australia) Angelo Mouzouris	S2		All	
Nissan	Altima L33	MW Motorsport	16	(Australia) Dean Fiore	S2		4	
Nissan	Altima L33	MW Motorsport	27	(Australia) Tyler Everingham	S2		All	
Nissan	Altima L33	Grove Racing	10	(New Zealand) Matthew Payne	S2	R	All	

Icon	Class
S2	Super2
S3	Super3
R	Rookie Cup

=== Team changes ===
==== Super2 ====
Matt Stone Racing fielded two Super2 cars, expanding from running a single car in 2021.

Grove Junior Team joined the championship fielding a single Nissan Altima L33 for Matthew Payne.

Brad Jones Racing returns to the championship after a year's absence fielding a Holden Commodore VF for Elly Morrow.

Paul Morris Motorsport returned to the championship after last competing in 2018 fielding a single Ford FG X Falcon for current Super3 Series Champion Nash Morris.

Eggleston Motorsport scaled down its commitment to the series from three cars to two.

MW Motorsport scaled down its commitment to the series from four cars to three.

==== Super3 ====
Eggleston Motorsport scaled there operation up to three cars, running two Holden VE Commodores for Steven Page and Kai Allen and a Ford FG Falcon for David Murphy.

=== Driver changes ===
==== Super2 ====
Triple Eight Race Engineering fielded a new driver lineup with Cameron Hill who graduated from Porsche Carrera Cup Australia to replace Broc Feeney graduated to the Supercars Championship to replace Jamie Whincup. Declan Fraser left MW Motorsport to replace Angelo Mouzouris who took over his spot at MW Motorsport.

Matthew Payne, who graduated from Porsche Carrera Cup Australia, joined Grove Racing on a full time basis.

Brad Jones Racing driver Elly Morrow graduated from Super3 Series.

Cameron Crick graduated from SuperUtes Series to join Eggleston Motorsport.

Ryal Harris graduated from SuperUtes Series to join Matt Stone Racing.

Jay Hanson graduated from TCR Australia to join Image Racing.

Thomas Maxwell joined MW Motorsport.

Nash Morris graduated from Super3 Series to join Paul Morris Motorsport.

==== Super3 ====
Brad Vaughan graduated from Toyota 86 Racing Series to join Anderson Motorsport.

Bradley Neill returned to Super3 to join Matt Stone Racing.

Kai Allen graduated from Toyota 86 Racing Series to join Eggleston Motorsport.

== Calendar ==
Six rounds hosted a round of the 2022 championship:

Round	Event	Circuit	Location	Dates
1	Sydney SuperNight	(New South Wales) Sydney Motorsport Park	Eastern Creek, New South Wales	5–6 March
2	Perth SuperNight	(Western Australia) Wanneroo Raceway	Neerabup, Western Australia	30 April – 1 May
3	Townsville 500	(Queensland) Reid Park Street Circuit	Townsville, Queensland	9–10 July
4	Sandown SuperSprint	(Victoria (state)) Sandown Raceway	Springvale, Victoria	20–21 August
5	Bathurst 1000	(New South Wales) Mount Panorama Circuit	Bathurst, New South Wales	7–8 October
6	Adelaide 500	(South Australia) Adelaide Street Circuit	Adelaide, South Australia	3–4 December

== Results and standings ==
=== Season summary ===
==== Super2 Series ====
Round	Event	Pole position	Fastest lap	Winning driver	Winning team	Round Winner
1	(New South Wales) Sydney SuperNight	(New Zealand) Matthew Payne	(Australia) Tyler Everingham	(Australia) Jaylyn Robotham	Image Racing	(Australia) Zak Best
1	(New South Wales) Sydney SuperNight	(Australia) Declan Fraser	(Australia) Zak Best	(Australia) Zak Best	Tickford Racing	(Australia) Zak Best
2	(Western Australia) Perth SuperNight	(New Zealand) Matthew Payne	(Australia) Cameron Hill	(New Zealand) Matthew Payne	Grove Racing	(New Zealand) Matthew Payne
2	(Western Australia) Perth SuperNight	(New Zealand) Matthew Payne	(Australia) Tyler Everingham	(Australia) Tyler Everingham	MW Motorsport	(New Zealand) Matthew Payne
3	(Queensland) Townsville 500	(Australia) Zak Best	(Australia) Tyler Everingham	(Australia) Tyler Everingham	MW Motorsport	(Australia) Declan Fraser
3	(Queensland) Townsville 500	(Australia) Declan Fraser	(Australia) Cameron Hill	(Australia) Declan Fraser	Triple Eight Race Engineering	(Australia) Declan Fraser
4	(Victoria (state)) Sandown SuperSprint	(Australia) Tyler Everingham (Note: Matthew Payne was on Pole Position but set a fastest sector under a yellow flag and was given a three-spot grid penalty which sent him back to fourth and elevating Tyler Everingham to pole)	(Australia) Tyler Everingham	(Australia) Declan Fraser	Triple Eight Race Engineering	(Australia) Zak Best
4	(Victoria (state)) Sandown SuperSprint	(Australia) Thomas Maxwell	(Australia) Tyler Everingham	(New Zealand) Matthew Payne	Grove Racing	(Australia) Zak Best
5	(New South Wales) Bathurst 1000	(Australia) Zak Best	(Australia) Tyler Everingham	(Australia) Zak Best	Tickford Racing	(Australia) Zak Best
5	(New South Wales) Bathurst 1000	(Australia) Tyler Everingham	race cancelled (Note: Race 10 was cancelled due to torrential rain, no points were awarded.)			(Australia) Zak Best
6	(South Australia) Adelaide 500	(Australia) Declan Fraser	(Australia) Declan Fraser	(Australia) Declan Fraser	Triple Eight Race Engineering	(Australia) Declan Fraser
6	(South Australia) Adelaide 500	(Australia) Declan Fraser	(Australia) Matt Chahda	(Australia) Declan Fraser	Triple Eight Race Engineering	(Australia) Declan Fraser

==== Super3 Series ====
Round	Event	Pole position	Fastest lap	Winning driver	Winning team	Round Winner
1	(New South Wales) Sydney SuperNight	(Australia) Brad Vaughan	(Australia) Brad Vaughan	(Australia) Brad Vaughan	Anderson Motorsport	(Australia) Kai Allen
1	(New South Wales) Sydney SuperNight	(Australia) Kai Allen	(Australia) Kai Allen	(Australia) Kai Allen	Eggleston Motorsport	(Australia) Kai Allen
2	(Western Australia) Perth SuperNight	(Australia) Kai Allen	(Australia) Kai Allen	(Australia) Kai Allen	Eggleston Motorsport	(Australia) Kai Allen
2	(Western Australia) Perth SuperNight	(Australia) Kai Allen	(Australia) Kai Allen	(Australia) Kai Allen	Eggleston Motorsport	(Australia) Kai Allen
3	(Queensland) Townsville 500	(Australia) Kai Allen	(Australia) Brad Vaughan	(Australia) Brad Vaughan	Anderson Motorsport	(Australia) Kai Allen
3	(Queensland) Townsville 500	(Australia) Kai Allen	(Australia) Blake Fardell	(Australia) Kai Allen	Eggleston Motorsport	(Australia) Kai Allen
4	(Victoria (state)) Sandown SuperSprint	(Australia) Kai Allen	(Australia) Brad Vaughan	(Australia) Kai Allen	Eggleston Motorsport	(Australia) Brad Vaughan
4	(Victoria (state)) Sandown SuperSprint	(Australia) Kai Allen	(Australia) Kai Allen	(Australia) Brad Vaughan	Anderson Motorsport	(Australia) Brad Vaughan
5	(New South Wales) Bathurst 1000	(Australia) Kai Allen	(Australia) Kai Allen	(Australia) Kai Allen	Eggleston Motorsport	(Australia) Kai Allen
5	(New South Wales) Bathurst 1000	(Australia) Kai Allen	race cancelled			(Australia) Kai Allen
6	(South Australia) Adelaide 500	(Australia) Kai Allen	(Australia) Brad Vaughan	(Australia) Brad Vaughan	Anderson Motorsport	(Australia) Brad Vaughan
6	(South Australia) Adelaide 500	(Australia) Kai Allen	(Australia) Brad Vaughan	(Australia) Brad Vaughan	Anderson Motorsport	(Australia) Brad Vaughan

=== Series standings ===
==== Points system ====
Points were awarded for each race at an event, to the driver of a car that completed at least 75% of the race distance and was running at the completion of the race. At least 50% of the planned race distance must be completed for the result to be valid and championship points awarded. The following points scales apply to both the Super2 and Super3 Series.

Position
1st	2nd	3rd	4th	5th	6th	7th	8th	9th	10th	11th	12th	13th	14th	15th	16th	17th
150	138	129	120	111	102	96	90	84	78	72	69	66	63	60	57	54

==== Super2 Series ====
Pos.	Driver	No.	SMP (New South Wales)		BAR (Western Australia)		TOW (Queensland)		SAN (Victoria (state))		BAT (New South Wales)		ADE (South Australia)		Pen.	Points
1	(Australia) Declan Fraser	777	6	**3**	6	3	4	**1**	1	8	5	C	**1**	**1**	0	1383
2	(Australia) Zak Best	78	2	1	Ret	7	**2**	12	2	3	**1**	C	4	3	0	1257
3	(New Zealand) Matthew Payne	10	**4**	2	**1**	**2**	10	Ret	19	1	3	C	2	4	0	1209
4	(Australia) Tyler Everingham	27	15	5	3	1	1	Ret	**17**	4	2	**C**	5	5	0	1134
5	(Australia) Cameron Hill	111	7	11	2	4	6	3	14	11	4	C	3	Ret	0	1047
6	(Australia) Matt Chahda	18	10	8	11	13	3	2	6	13			11	2	0	957
7	(Australia) Thomas Maxwell	3	3	4	7	15	11	5	12	**Ret**	10	C	7	11	0	903
8	(Australia) Jaylyn Robotham	999	1	6	14	5	15	Ret	4	14			6	7	0	867
9	(Australia) Aaron Seton	30	5	7	12	10	5	8	16	9	9	C	Ret	12	0	849
10	(Australia) Jay Hanson	49	14	9	Ret	14	9	4	10	6	6	C	10	Ret	0	780
11	(Australia) Zane Morse	11	8	12	9	6	8	10	8	Ret	12	C	12	Ret	0	747
12	(Australia) Cameron Crick	38	9	14	8	11	12	Ret	15	7	8	C	Ret	9	0	708
13	(Australia) Ryal Harris	58	11	Ret	10	12	16	6	9	Ret	11	C	8	6	0	702
14	(Australia) Elly Morrow	8	16	13	13	16	13	11	18	12	15	C			0	567
15	(Australia) Matt McLean	54	12	10	4	9			7	Ret	7	C			0	531
16	(Australia) Angelo Mouzouris	6	13	Ret	5	8	Ret	7	5	Ret	Ret	C	Ret	DNS	0	459
17	(Australia) Nash Morris	67	Ret	Ret	Ret	Ret	14	Ret	13	10	14	C	9	10	0	438
18	(Australia) Dean Fiore	16							3	5					0	240
19	(Australia) Jack Perkins	50							11	2					0	210
20	(Australia) Tim Blanchard	54					7	9							0	180
21	(Australia) Lochie Dalton	8											12	8	0	159
22	(Australia) Reef McCarthy	999									13	C			0	66
Pos.	Driver	No.	SMP (New South Wales)		BAR (Western Australia)		TOW (Queensland)		SAN (Victoria (state))		BAT (New South Wales)		ADE (South Australia)		Pen.	Points

Key
Colour	Result
Gold	Winner
Silver	Second place
Bronze	Third place
Green	Other points position
Blue	Other classified position
Blue	Not classified, finished (NC)
Purple	Not classified, retired (Ret)
Red	Did not qualify (DNQ)
Red	Did not pre-qualify (DNPQ)
Black	Disqualified (DSQ)
White	Did not start (DNS)
White	Race cancelled (C)
Blank	Did not practice (DNP)
Blank	Excluded (EX)
Blank	Did not arrive (DNA)
Blank	Withdrawn (WD)
Blank	Did not enter (cell empty)
Text formatting	Meaning
**Bold**	Pole position
Italics	Fastest lap

==== Super3 Series ====
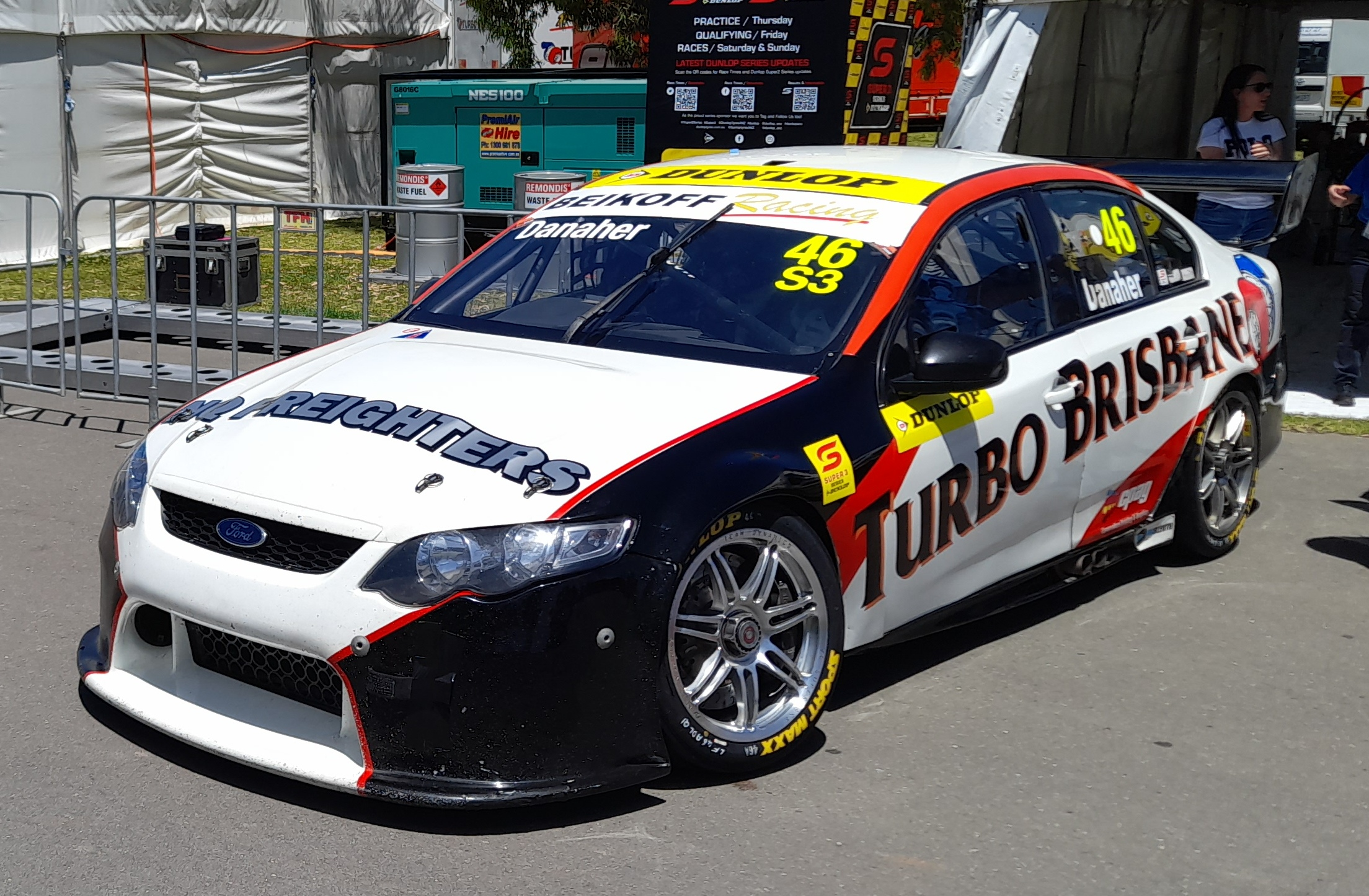
Jarred Danaher placed 11th in the 2022 Dunlop Super3 Series driving this Ford Falcon FG

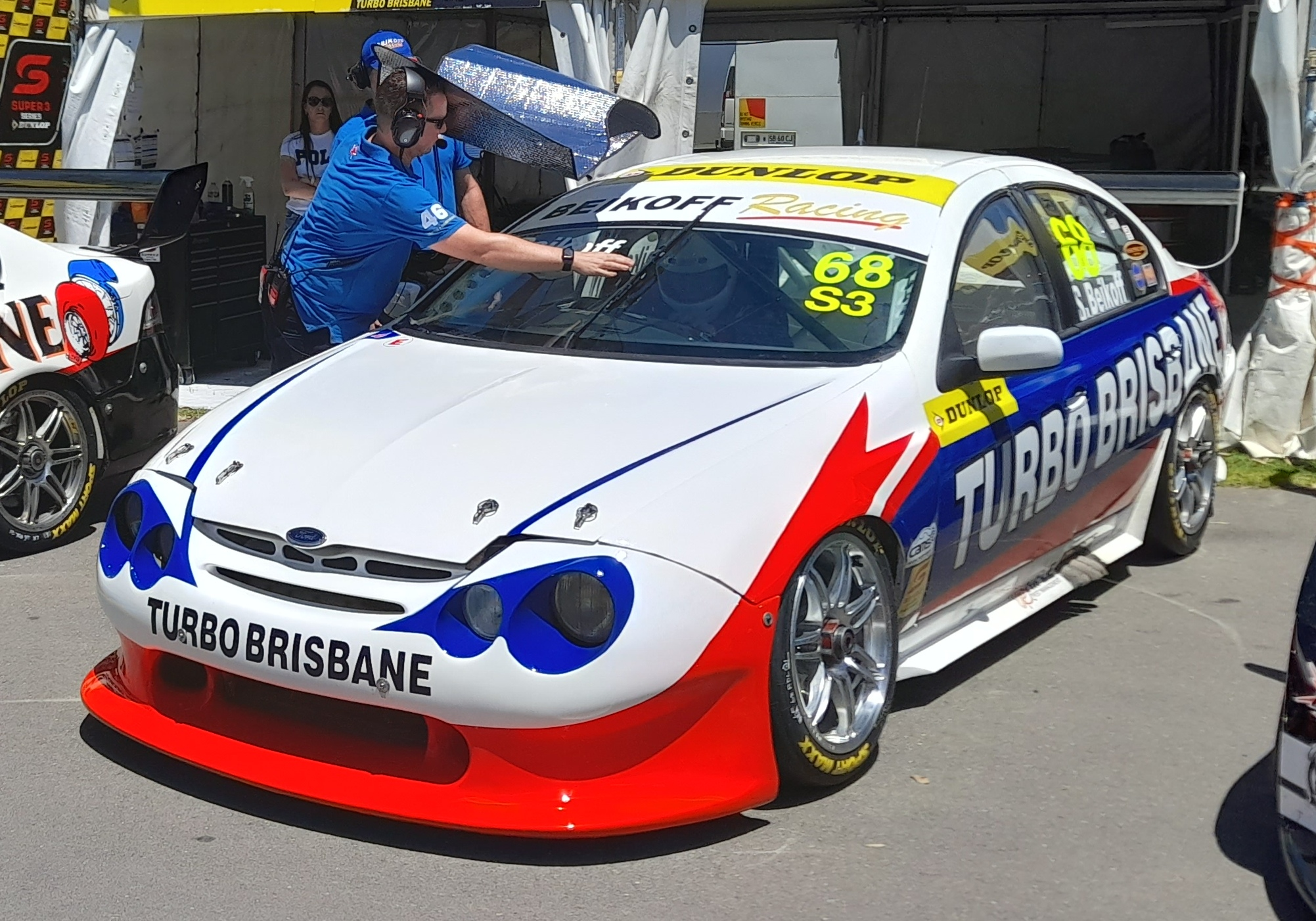
Shane Beikoff placed 18th in the 2022 Dunlop Super3 Series driving this Ford Falcon AU

Pos.	Driver	No.	SMP (New South Wales)		BAR (Western Australia)		TOW (Queensland)		SAN (Victoria (state))		BAT (New South Wales)		ADE (South Australia)		Pen.	Points
1	(Australia) Brad Vaughan	5	**1**	2	8	2	1	7	2	1	2	C	1	1	0	1488
2	(Australia) Kai Allen	26	2	**1**	**1**	**1**	**2**	**1**	**1**	**10**	**1**	**C**	**2**	**Ret**	0	1392
3	(Australia) Jim Policina	7	5	5	4	5	4	11	8	3	4	C	5	3	0	1224
4	(Australia) Chris Smerdon	39	12	7	6	6	5	3	13	2			3	2	0	1080
5	(Australia) Blake Fardell	77	3	4	2	3	3	2	9	11			WD	WD	0	939
6	(Australia) Ray Hislop	23	4	3			7	6	3	Ret	11	C	6	6	0	852
7	(Australia) Jason Gomersall	35	Ret	9	5	8	9	8	5	Ret	3	C	7	DNS	0	795
8	(Australia) Garry Hills	76	7	6	3	4	Ret	Ret	12	4	7	C			0	732
9	(Australia) Steven Page	2	9	10	9	9	Ret	4	7	9	8	C	DNS	DNS	0	720
10	(Australia) Tony Auddino	4	8	Ret	7	7	11	5	DNS	7	6	C	DNS	DNS	0	663
11	(Australia) Jarred Danaher	46	6	8			6	Ret	4	Ret	Ret	C	4	4	0	654
12	(Australia) James Masterton	219	Ret	Ret			10	9	10	Ret					0	318
13	(New Zealand) Jordan Michels	28							6	6					0	204
14	(Australia) Gary Collins	96									DNS	C	8	5	0	201
15	(Australia) Layton Barker	72					8	10							0	168
16	(Australia) Jason Foley	17							11	8					0	162
17	(Australia) Paul Boschert	25	10	Ret							9	C			0	162
18	(Australia) Shane Beikoff	68	11	11			DNS	DNS					Ret	DNS	0	144
19	(Australia) David Murphy	24					DNS	DNS			5	C			0	111
20	(Australia) Brendan Strong	75							Ret	5	DNS	C	WD	WD	0	111
–	(Australia) Adam Wallis	33											Ret	Ret	0	0
Pos.	Driver	No.	SMP (New South Wales)		BAR (Western Australia)		TOW (Queensland)		SAN (Victoria (state))		BAT (New South Wales)		ADE (South Australia)		Pen.	Points

Key
Colour	Result
Gold	Winner
Silver	Second place
Bronze	Third place
Green	Other points position
Blue	Other classified position
Blue	Not classified, finished (NC)
Purple	Not classified, retired (Ret)
Red	Did not qualify (DNQ)
Red	Did not pre-qualify (DNPQ)
Black	Disqualified (DSQ)
White	Did not start (DNS)
White	Race cancelled (C)
Blank	Did not practice (DNP)
Blank	Excluded (EX)
Blank	Did not arrive (DNA)
Blank	Withdrawn (WD)
Blank	Did not enter (cell empty)
Text formatting	Meaning
**Bold**	Pole position
Italics	Fastest lap
