= 2022 Darwin Triple Crown =

Motor racing event

(Northern Territory) 2022 Darwin Triple Crown
Event Information
- Round 6 of 12 in the 2022 Supercars Championship
- Layout of the Hidden Valley Raceway
- Date: 18–19 June 2022
- Location: Darwin, Northern Territory
- Venue: Hidden Valley Raceway

Results
Race 1
Distance	38 laps	110 km
Pole position	(Australia) Will Davison; Dick Johnson Racing	01:04.9542
Winner	(Australia) Anton De Pasquale; Dick Johnson Racing	43:47.1156
Race 2
Distance	37 laps	106 km
Pole position	(Australia) Cam Waters; Tickford Racing	01:05.2552
Winner	(Australia) Cam Waters; Tickford Racing	56:57.8420
Race 3
Distance	38 laps	110 km
Pole position	(Australia) Will Davison; Dick Johnson Racing	01:04.8114
Winner	(Australia) Chaz Mostert; Walkinshaw Andretti United	47:06.0030
Round Results
First	(Australia) Anton de Pasquale; Dick Johnson Racing	272 pts
Second	(Australia) Will Davison; Dick Johnson Racing	269 pts
Third	(Australia) Cam Waters; Tickford Racing	250 pts

The 2022 Darwin Triple Crown (known for commercial purposes as the 2022 Merlin Darwin Triple Crown) was a motor racing event held as a part of the 2022 Supercars Championship from Saturday 18 June to Sunday 19 June 2022. The event was held at the Hidden Valley Raceway in Darwin, Northern Territory. It was the sixth round of the 2022 Supercars Championship and consisted of three races of 110 kilometres each. The 2022 Darwin Triple Crown was the 2022 season's indigenous round, with teams required to make a livery change to represent the first nations culture for the round. Walkinshaw Andretti United opted to re-use their special livery in Townsville for NAIDOC Week.

== Results ==
=== Race 1 ===
Pos	No.	Driver	Team	Laps	Time / Retired	Grid	Points
1	11	(Australia) Anton de Pasquale	Dick Johnson Racing	38	43:47.1156	2	100
2	17	(Australia) Will Davison	Dick Johnson Racing	38	+1.1831	1	92
3	97	(New Zealand) Shane van Gisbergen	Triple Eight Race Engineering	38	+1.4784	4	91
4	8	(New Zealand) Andre Heimgartner	Brad Jones Racing	38	+6.6768	3	80
5	18	(Australia) Mark Winterbottom	Team 18	38	+14.4053	5	74
6	20	(Australia) Scott Pye	Team 18	38	+18.3171	9	68
7	6	(Australia) Cam Waters	Tickford Racing	38	+19.3786	12	64
8	88	(Australia) Broc Feeney	Triple Eight Race Engineering	38	+23.9295	15	60
9	5	(Australia) James Courtney	Tickford Racing	38	+24.4053	19	56
10	99	(Australia) Brodie Kostecki	Erebus Motorsport	38	+24.9411	13	52
11	56	(Australia) Jake Kostecki	Tickford Racing	38	+25.4186	10	48
12	3	(Australia) Tim Slade	Blanchard Racing Team	38	+29.579	24	46
13	34	(Australia) Jack Le Brocq	Matt Stone Racing	38	+33.551	17	44
14	2	(Australia) Nick Percat	Walkinshaw Andretti United	38	+33.5743	21	42
15	10	(Australia) Lee Holdsworth	Grove Racing	38	+34.0505	26	40
16	35	(Australia) Todd Hazelwood	Matt Stone Racing	38	+34.0774	22	38
17	27	(Australia) Jayden Ojeda	Walkinshaw Andretti United	38	+35.1375	25	36
18	14	(Australia) Bryce Fullwood	Brad Jones Racing	38	+35.3056	8	34
19	55	(Australia) Thomas Randle	Tickford Racing	38	+39.1215	14	32
20	96	(Australia) Macauley Jones	Brad Jones Racing	38	+44.6432	18	30
21	78	(Australia) Zak Best	Tickford Racing	38	+58.7357	27	28
22	76	(Australia) Garry Jacobson	PremiAir Racing	38	+1:02.0793	20	26
23	22	(New Zealand) Chris Pither	PremiAir Racing	37	+1 lap	11	24
24	4	(Australia) Jack Smith	Brad Jones Racing	35	+3 laps	23	22
25	26	(Australia) David Reynolds	Grove Racing	31	+7 laps	7	20
Ret	9	(Australia) Will Brown	Erebus Motorsport	2	crash damage	16	0
DSQ	25	(Australia) Chaz Mostert	Walkinshaw Andretti United	0	Illegal cooling on grid	6	0

=== Race 2 ===
Pos	No.	Driver	Team	Laps	Time / Retired	Grid	Points
1	6	(Australia) Cam Waters	Tickford Racing	37	56:57.8420	1	100
2	17	(Australia) Will Davison	Dick Johnson Racing	37	+0.617	3	92
3	97	(New Zealand) Shane van Gisbergen	Triple Eight Race Engineering	37	+1.8496	4	86
4	11	(Australia) Anton De Pasquale	Dick Johnson Racing	37	+2.7476	5	80
5	26	(Australia) David Reynolds	Grove Racing	37	+3.6527	2	79
6	34	(Australia) Jack Le Brocq	Matt Stone Racing	37	+10.5375	8	68
7	18	(Australia) Mark Winterbottom	Team 18	37	+11.0661	10	64
8	25	(Australia) Chaz Mostert	Walkinshaw Andretti United	37	+12.2348	9	60
9	8	(New Zealand) Andre Heimgartner	Brad Jones Racing	37	+12.6211	6	56
10	2	(Australia) Nick Percat	Walkinshaw Andretti United	37	+17.3743	12	52
11	56	(Australia) Jake Kostecki	Tickford Racing	37	+23.0574	15	48
12	10	(Australia) Lee Holdsworth	Grove Racing	37	+26.9677	18	46
13	88	(Australia) Broc Feeney	Triple Eight Race Engineering	37	+27.5197	7	44
14	3	(Australia) Tim Slade	Blanchard Racing Team	37	+28.0682	21	42
15	14	(Australia) Bryce Fullwood	Brad Jones Racing	37	+28.4083	11	40
16	99	(Australia) Brodie Kostecki	Erebus Motorsport	37	+29.2098	23	38
17	96	(Australia) Macauley Jones	Brad Jones Racing	37	+31.0502	25	36
18	76	(Australia) Garry Jacobson	PremiAir Racing	37	+31.9187	22	34
19	4	(Australia) Jack Smith	Brad Jones Racing	37	+32.3231	16	32
20	9	(Australia) Will Brown	Erebus Motorsport	37	+33.4637	19	30
21	78	(Australia) Zak Best	Tickford Racing	37	+35.2869	27	28
22	22	(New Zealand) Chris Pither	PremiAir Racing	37	+39.4494	24	26
23	27	(Australia) Jayden Ojeda	Walkinshaw Andretti United	37	+43.143	26	24
24	35	(Australia) Todd Hazelwood	Matt Stone Racing	29	+8 laps	17	22
Ret	55	(Australia) Thomas Randle	Tickford Racing	6	Crash damage	14	0
Ret	5	(Australia) James Courtney	Tickford Racing	0	Crash	20	0
Ret	20	(Australia) Scott Pye	Team 18	0	Crash	13	0

=== Race 3 ===
Pos	No.	Driver	Team	Laps	Time / Retired	Grid	Points
1	25	(Australia) Chaz Mostert	Walkinshaw Andretti United	38	47:06.0030	6	100
2	11	(Australia) Anton De Pasquale	Dick Johnson Racing	38	+0.958	2	92
3	6	(Australia) Cam Waters	Tickford Racing	38	+1.1035	4	86
4	17	(Australia) Will Davison	Dick Johnson Racing	38	+1.4933	1	85
5	8	(New Zealand) Andre Heimgartner	Brad Jones Racing	38	+3.3056	9	74
6	88	(Australia) Broc Feeney	Triple Eight Race Engineering	38	+3.3158	3	68
7	9	(Australia) Will Brown	Erebus Motorsport	38	+8.8692	8	64
8	56	(Australia) Jake Kostecki	Tickford Racing	38	+9.0464	12	60
9	18	(Australia) Mark Winterbottom	Team 18	38	+9.2514	10	56
10	2	(Australia) Nick Percat	Walkinshaw Andretti United	38	+9.3879	15	52
11	3	(Australia) Tim Slade	Blanchard Racing Team	38	+9.6175	16	48
12	26	(Australia) David Reynolds	Grove Racing	38	+11.3049	11	46
13	34	(Australia) Jack Le Brocq	Matt Stone Racing	38	+11.4972	13	44
14	14	(Australia) Bryce Fullwood	Brad Jones Racing	38	+11.6735	19	42
15	55	(Australia) Thomas Randle	Tickford Racing	38	+12.1206	17	40
16	10	(Australia) Lee Holdsworth	Grove Racing	38	+12.6078	14	38
17	4	(Australia) Jack Smith	Brad Jones Racing	38	+15.7478	25	36
18	96	(Australia) Macauley Jones	Brad Jones Racing	38	+15.9186	22	34
19	5	(Australia) James Courtney	Tickford Racing	38	+16.6211	18	32
20	22	(New Zealand) Chris Pither	PremiAir Racing	38	+19.0477	20	30
21	97	(New Zealand) Shane van Gisbergen	Triple Eight Race Engineering	38	+40.036	5	28
22	76	(Australia) Garry Jacobson	PremiAir Racing	38	+43.0405	26	26
23	35	(Australia) Todd Hazelwood	Matt Stone Racing	37	+1 lap	21	24
24	99	(Australia) Brodie Kostecki	Erebus Motorsport	37	+1 lap	24	22
Ret	27	(Australia) Jayden Ojeda	Walkinshaw Andretti United	25	Suspension	23	0
Ret	78	(Australia) Zak Best	Tickford Racing	24	Crash	26	0

== Championship standings after the race ==
Drivers' Championship standings

	Pos.	Driver	Points
Unchanged	1	(New Zealand) Shane van Gisbergen	1581
Unchanged	2	(Australia) Anton de Pasquale	1367
Unchanged	3	(Australia) Cam Waters	1293
Unchanged	4	(Australia) Will Davison	1287
Unchanged	5	(Australia) David Reynolds	1111

Teams Championship standings

	Pos.	Constructor	Points
	1	(Australia) Dick Johnson Racing	2654
	2	(Australia) Triple Eight Race Engineering	2640
Unchanged	3	(Australia) Tickford Racing	2145
Unchanged	4	(Australia) Grove Racing	1987
Unchanged	5	(Australia) Walkinshaw Andretti United	1866

- Note: Only the top five positions are included for standings.
