= 2026 Sandown 500 =

Motor racing event in Victoria, Australia

(Victoria (state)) 2026 Sandown 500
Event Information
- Round 13 of 14 in the 2026 Supercars Championship
- Layout of Sandown Raceway
- Date: 6–8 November 2026
- Location: Melbourne, Victoria
- Venue: Sandown Raceway

Results
Race 1
Distance	79 laps	250 km
Race 2
Distance	79 laps	250 km

The 2026 Sandown 500 (known for commercial reasons as the 2026 Penrite Oil Sandown 500) is a motor racing event for Supercars that will be held on 6–8 November 2026 at Sandown Raceway in the Melbourne, Victoria, Australia. The round consists of two 250km races and is the thirteenth, and penultimate, round of the 2026 Supercars Championship, and is the second round of the 2026 Supercars Finals Series.

== Background ==
The event will be held on the weekend of 6–8 November 2026. It is the 52nd Supercars event held at the Sandown Raceway in Melbourne and will consist of two 250km races. It is the 42nd running of the Sandown 500.

This event marks the second year of the Finals Series championship format being at Sandown. This sees the championship's top 7 drivers from the Gold Coast 500 have their points reset, with the top 4 at the end of the round remaining in contention for the driver's championship.

=== Support Series ===
- Super2 Series (2 races)
- GR Cup (3 races)
- TransAm (3 races)
- Porsche Sprint Challenge Australia (3 races)

=== Entry list ===
Twenty-four cars entered the event — eight Chevrolet Camaros, eleven Ford Mustangs, and five Toyota GR Supras. No wildcard entered the event.

Car Identification
no.	Chevrolet Camaro ZL1
no.	Ford Mustang S650
no.	Toyota GR Supra

=== Qualifying 1 ===
==== Provisional ====
Pos.	No.	Driver	Team	Time	Gap	Grid
1						Top 10
2						Top 10
3						Top 10
4						Top 10
5						Top 10
6						Top 10
7						Top 10
8						Top 10
9						Top 10
10						Top 10
11						11
12						12
13						13
14						14
15						15
16						16
17						17
18						18
19						19
20						20
21						21
22						22
23						23
24						24

==== Top-Ten Shoot Out ====
Pos.	No.	Driver	Team	Time	Gap	Grid
1						1
2						2
3						3
4						4
5						5
6						6
7						7
8						8
9						9
10						10

=== Race 1 ===
Pos.	No.	Driver	Team	Laps	Time/Retired	Grid	Pts
1							
2							
3							
4							
5							
6							
7							
8							
9							
10							
11							
12							
13							
14							
15							
16							
17							
18							
19							
20							
21							
22							
23							

=== Qualifying 2 ===
==== Provisional ====
Pos.	No.	Driver	Team	Time	Gap	Grid
1						Top 10
2						Top 10
3						Top 10
4						Top 10
5						Top 10
6						Top 10
7						Top 10
8						Top 10
9						Top 10
10						Top 10
11						11
12						12
13						13
14						14
15						15
16						16
17						17
18						18
19						19
20						20
21						21
22						22
23						23
24						24

==== Top-Ten Shoot Out ====
Pos.	No.	Driver	Team	Time	Gap	Grid
1	19	(New Zealand) Matt Payne	Grove Racing	1:08.1104		1
2	18	(Australia) Anton De Pasquale	Team 18	1:08.2105	+0.1001	2
3	36	(Australia) Cooper Murray	PremiAir Racing	1:08.3096	+0.1992	3
4	17	(Australia) Brodie Kostecki	Dick Johnson Racing	1:08.3862	+0.2758	4
5	10	(Australia) Zach Bates	Matt Stone Racing	1:08.4337	+0.3233	5
6	88	(Australia) Broc Feeney	Triple Eight Race Engineering	1:08.4954	+0.3850	6
7	26	(Australia) Kai Allen	Grove Racing	1:08.5484	+0.4380	7
8	8	(New Zealand) Andre Heimgartner	Brad Jones Racing	1:08.6304	+0.5200	8
9	55	(Australia) Thomas Randle	Tickford Racing	1:08.8792	+0.7688	9
10	7	(Australia) James Golding	Blanchard Racing Team	1:08.9849	+0.8745	10

=== Race 2 ===
Pos.	No.	Driver	Team	Laps	Time/Retired	Grid	Pts
1	19	(New Zealand) Matt Payne	Grove Racing	79	1:33:33.4625	1	
2	18	(Australia) Anton De Pasquale	Team 18	79	1:33:34.2007	2	
3	36	(Australia) Cooper Murray	PremiAir Racing	79	1:33:40.7928	3	
4	88	(Australia) Broc Feeney	Triple Eight Race Engineering	79	1:33:50.6712	6	
5	1	(Australia) Chaz Mostert	Walkinshaw TWG Racing	79	1:33:56.7546	11	
6	55	(Australia) Thomas Randle	Tickford Racing	79	1:34:00.5531	9	
7	888	(Australia) Will Brown	Triple Eight Race Engineering	79	1:34:02.1362	19	
8	8	(New Zealand) Andre Heimgartner	Brad Jones Racing	79	1:34:11.5078	8	
9	31	(Australia) Jayden Ojeda	PremiAir Racing	79	1:34:12.3469	13	
10	17	(Australia) Brodie Kostecki	Dick Johnson Racing	79	1:34:12.5171	4	
11	4	(Australia) Jack Le Brocq	Matt Stone Racing	79	1:34:14.1364	15	
12	10	(Australia) Zach Bates	Matt Stone Racing	79	1:34:14.4754	5	
13	48	(Australia) David Reynolds	Team 18	79	1:34:18.0721	23	
14	96	(Australia) Macauley Jones	Brad Jones Racing	79	1:34:19.7587	14	
15	6	(Australia) Cameron Waters	Tickford Racing	79	1:34:20.7402	18	
16	2	(New Zealand) Ryan Wood	Walkinshaw TWG Racing	79	1:34:24.8287	16	
17	7	(Australia) James Golding	Blanchard Racing Team	79	1:34:25.0022	10	
18	26	(Australia) Kai Allen	Grove Racing	79	1:34:25.3541	7	
19	14	(Australia) Cameron Hill	Brad Jones Racing	79	1:34:31.2376	12	
20	99	(Australia) Jarrod Hughes	Erebus Motorsport	79	1:34:46.5497	20	
21	3	(Australia) Aaron Cameron	Blanchard Racing Team	79	1:34:49.2241	24	
22	9	(Australia) Jobe Stewart	Erebus Motorsport	78	+1 Lap	17	
23	38	(Australia) Rylan Gray	Dick Johnson Racing	78	+1 Lap	21	
24	11	(Australia) Jackson Walls	Triple Eight Race Engineering	78	+1 Lap	22	
