= 2026 Ipswich Super 440 =

(Queensland) 2026 Century Batteries Ipswich Super 440
Event Information
- Round 9 of 14 in the 2026 Supercars Championship
- Layout of Queensland Raceway
- Date: 21 August - 23 August 2026
- Location: Ipswich, Queensland
- Venue: Queensland Raceway

Results
Race 1
Distance	39 laps	120 km
Pole position	(New Zealand) Matt Payne; Grove Racing	
Winner	(Australia) Brodie Kostecki; Dick Johnson Racing	46:10.5664
Race 2
Distance	39 laps	120 km
Pole position	(New Zealand) Matt Payne; Grove Racing	54.067
Winner	(Australia) Will Brown; Triple Eight Race Engineering	51:34.1373
Race 3
Distance	62 laps	200 km
Pole position	(Australia) Broc Feeney; Triple Eight Race Engineering	53.648
Winner	(Australia) Broc Feeney; Triple Eight Race Engineering	1:15:44.299
Round Results
First		pts
Second		pts
Third		pts

The 2026 Ipswich Super 440 (known for commercial purposes as the 2026 Century Batteries Ipswich Super 440) was a motor racing event held as a part of the 2026 Supercars Championship from Friday 21 August to Sunday 23 August 2026. The event was held at Queensland Raceway in Willowbank, Queensland. It was the ninth round of the 2026 Supercars Championship and consisted of two races of 120 kilometers and one race with refueling of 200 kilometers.

Broc Feeney won the Sprint Cup for the second year in a row, making him still the only winner of the trophy.

== Support Series ==
- Trans Am (3 races)
- Aussie Racing Cars (4 races)
- GR Cup (3 races)
- Porsche Carrera Cup Australia (2 races)

== Entry List ==
Twenty-seven cars contested the event; ten Chevrolet Camaros, twelve Ford Mustangs and five Toyota GR Supras. In addition to the 24 regular-season entries, three wildcard entrants joined the field, from Tickford Racing, with Ben Gomersall, Team 18, for Bayley Hall and Matt Stone Racing, for Aaron Seton.

Two drivers made their Supercars debut, with wildcard entrants Ben Gomersall and Bayley Hall.

== Results ==
=== Race 1 ===
Pos.	No.	Driver	Team	Car	Laps	Time/Retired	Grid	Pts
1	17	(Australia) Brodie Kostecki	Dick Johnson Racing	Ford Mustang S650	39	46:10.5664	2	80
2	19	(New Zealand) Matt Payne	Grove Racing	Ford Mustang S650	39		1	74
3	888	(Australia) Will Brown	Triple Eight Race Engineering	Ford Mustang S650	39			68
4	88	(Australia) Broc Feeney	Triple Eight Race Engineering	Ford Mustang S650	39			62
5	26	(Australia) Kai Allen	Grove Racing	Ford Mustang S650	39			57
6	1	(Australia) Chaz Mostert	Walkinshaw TWG Racing	Toyota GR Supra	39			53
7	38	(Australia) Rylan Gray	Dick Johnson Racing	Ford Mustang S650	39			54
8	6	(Australia) Cam Waters	Tickford Racing	Ford Mustang S650	39			45
9	2	(New Zealand) Ryan Wood	Walkinshaw TWG Racing	Toyota GR Supra	39			41
10	55	(Australia) Thomas Randle	Tickford Racing	Ford Mustang S650	39			38
11	7	(Australia) James Golding	Blanchard Racing Team	Ford Mustang S650	39			35
12	8	(New Zealand) Andre Heimgartner	Brad Jones Racing	Toyota GR Supra	39			32
13	18	(Australia) Anton De Pasquale	Team 18	Chevrolet Camaro ZL1	39			29
14	99	(Australia) Cooper Murray	Erebus Motorsport	Chevrolet Camaro ZL1	39			27
15	11	(Australia) Jackson Walls	Triple Eight Race Engineering	Ford Mustang S650	39			25
16	3	(Australia) Aaron Cameron	Blanchard Racing Team	Ford Mustang S650	39			23
17	14	(Australia) Cameron Hill	Brad Jones Racing	Toyota GR Supra	39			21
18	31	(Australia) Jayden Ojeda	PremiAir Racing	Chevrolet Camaro ZL1	39			19
19	10	(Australia) Zach Bates	Matt Stone Racing	Chevrolet Camaro ZL1	39			18
20	20	(Australia) David Reynolds	Team 18	Chevrolet Camaro ZL1	39			16
21	4	(Australia) Jack Le Brocq	Matt Stone Racing	Chevrolet Camaro ZL1	39			15
22	9	(Australia) Jobe Stewart	Erebus Motorsport	Chevrolet Camaro ZL1	39			14
23	777	(Australia) Declan Fraser	PremiAir Racing	Chevrolet Camaro ZL1	39			13
24	96	(Australia) Macauley Jones	Brad Jones Racing	Toyota GR Supra	39			12
25	5	(Australia) Ben Gomersall	Tickford Racing	Ford Mustang S650	39			
26	30	(Australia) Aaron Seton	Matt Stone Racing	Chevrolet Camaro ZL1	39			
27	15	(Australia) Bayley Hall	Team 18	Chevrolet Camaro ZL1	38	+1 Lap		
Fastest Lap: Broc Feeney (Triple Eight Race Engineering) - 1:09.2277 on lap 26

=== Race 2 ===
Pos.	No.	Driver	Team	Car	Laps	Time/Retired	Grid	Pts
1	888	(Australia) Will Brown	Triple Eight Race Engineering	Ford Mustang S650	39	51:34.1373		85
2	17	(Australia) Brodie Kostecki	Dick Johnson Racing	Ford Mustang S650	39		2	74
3	88	(Australia) Broc Feeney	Triple Eight Race Engineering	Ford Mustang S650	39			68
4	26	(Australia) Kai Allen	Grove Racing	Ford Mustang S650	39			62
5	1	(Australia) Chaz Mostert	Walkinshaw TWG Racing	Toyota GR Supra	39			57
6	19	(New Zealand) Matt Payne	Grove Racing	Ford Mustang S650	39		1	53
7	6	(Australia) Cam Waters	Tickford Racing	Ford Mustang S650	39			49
8	20	(Australia) David Reynolds	Team 18	Chevrolet Camaro ZL1	39			45
9	55	(Australia) Thomas Randle	Tickford Racing	Ford Mustang S650	39			41
10	18	(Australia) Anton De Pasquale	Team 18	Chevrolet Camaro ZL1	39			38
11	8	(New Zealand) Andre Heimgartner	Brad Jones Racing	Toyota GR Supra	39			35
12	3	(Australia) Aaron Cameron	Blanchard Racing Team	Ford Mustang S650	39			32
13	4	(Australia) Jack Le Brocq	Matt Stone Racing	Chevrolet Camaro ZL1	39			29
14	2	(New Zealand) Ryan Wood	Walkinshaw TWG Racing	Toyota GR Supra	39			27
15	14	(Australia) Cameron Hill	Brad Jones Racing	Toyota GR Supra	39			25
16	777	(Australia) Declan Fraser	PremiAir Racing	Chevrolet Camaro ZL1	39			23
17	11	(Australia) Jackson Walls	Triple Eight Race Engineering	Ford Mustang S650	39			21
18	96	(Australia) Macauley Jones	Brad Jones Racing	Toyota GR Supra	39			19
19	15	(Australia) Bayley Hall	Team 18	Chevrolet Camaro ZL1	39			18
20	10	(Australia) Zach Bates	Matt Stone Racing	Chevrolet Camaro ZL1	39			16
21	7	(Australia) James Golding	Blanchard Racing Team	Ford Mustang S650	39			15
22	5	(Australia) Ben Gomersall	Tickford Racing	Ford Mustang S650	39			14
23	30	(Australia) Aaron Seton	Matt Stone Racing	Chevrolet Camaro ZL1	39			13
24	31	(Australia) Jayden Ojeda	PremiAir Racing	Chevrolet Camaro ZL1	39			12
25	38	(Australia) Rylan Gray	Dick Johnson Racing	Ford Mustang S650	36	+3 Laps		
26	99	(Australia) Cooper Murray	Erebus Motorsport	Chevrolet Camaro ZL1	34	+5 Laps		
27	9	(Australia) Jobe Stewart	Erebus Motorsport	Chevrolet Camaro ZL1	30	+9 Laps		
Fastest Lap: Will Brown (Triple Eight Race Engineering) - 1:09.7844 on lap 23

=== Race 3 ===
Pos.	No.	Driver	Team	Car	Laps	Time/Retired	Grid	Pts
1	88	(Australia) Broc Feeney	Triple Eight Race Engineering	Ford Mustang S650	62	1:15:44.2993	2	140
2	17	(Australia) Brodie Kostecki	Dick Johnson Racing	Ford Mustang S650	62		4	129
3	888	(Australia) Will Brown	Triple Eight Race Engineering	Ford Mustang S650	62		1	118
4	26	(Australia) Kai Allen	Grove Racing	Ford Mustang S650	62		3	109
5	7	(Australia) James Golding	Blanchard Racing Team	Ford Mustang S650	62		8	105
6	18	(Australia) Anton De Pasquale	Team 18	Chevrolet Camaro ZL1	62		11	92
7	6	(Australia) Cam Waters	Tickford Racing	Ford Mustang S650	62		7	85
8	38	(Australia) Rylan Gray	Dick Johnson Racing	Ford Mustang S650	62		10	78
9	20	(Australia) David Reynolds	Team 18	Chevrolet Camaro ZL1	62		14	72
10	3	(Australia) Aaron Cameron	Blanchard Racing Team	Ford Mustang S650	62		9	66
11	55	(Australia) Thomas Randle	Tickford Racing	Ford Mustang S650	62		15	61
12	99	(Australia) Cooper Murray	Erebus Motorsport	Chevrolet Camaro ZL1	62		16	56
13	2	(New Zealand) Ryan Wood	Walkinshaw TWG Racing	Toyota GR Supra	62		17	51
14	8	(New Zealand) Andre Heimgartner	Brad Jones Racing	Toyota GR Supra	62		12	47
15	14	(Australia) Cameron Hill	Brad Jones Racing	Toyota GR Supra	62		24	44
16	10	(Australia) Zach Bates	Matt Stone Racing	Chevrolet Camaro ZL1	62		25	40
17	11	(Australia) Jackson Walls	Triple Eight Race Engineering	Ford Mustang S650	62		18	37
18	31	(Australia) Jayden Ojeda	PremiAir Racing	Chevrolet Camaro ZL1	62		19	34
19	777	(Australia) Declan Fraser	PremiAir Racing	Chevrolet Camaro ZL1	62		26	31
20	4	(Australia) Jack Le Brocq	Matt Stone Racing	Chevrolet Camaro ZL1	62		13	29
21	9	(Australia) Jobe Stewart	Erebus Motorsport	Chevrolet Camaro ZL1	62		21	26
22	30	(Australia) Aaron Seton	Matt Stone Racing	Chevrolet Camaro ZL1	61	+1 Lap	23	24
23	5	(Australia) Ben Gomersall	Tickford Racing	Ford Mustang S650	61	+1 Lap	20	22
24	96	(Australia) Macauley Jones	Brad Jones Racing	Toyota GR Supra	61	+1 Lap	27	
25	15	(Australia) Bayley Hall	Team 18	Chevrolet Camaro ZL1	61	+1 Lap	22	
Ret	19	(New Zealand) Matt Payne	Grove Racing	Ford Mustang S650	31	Engine	6	
Ret	1	(Australia) Chaz Mostert	Walkinshaw TWG Racing	Toyota GR Supra	23	Engine	5	
Fastest Lap: Kai Allen (Grove Racing) - 54.9478 on lap 67
