= 2026 Gold Coast 500 =

Motor racing event in Queensland, Australia

(Queensland) 2026 Gold Coast 500
Event Information
- Round 12 of 14 in the 2026 Supercars Championship
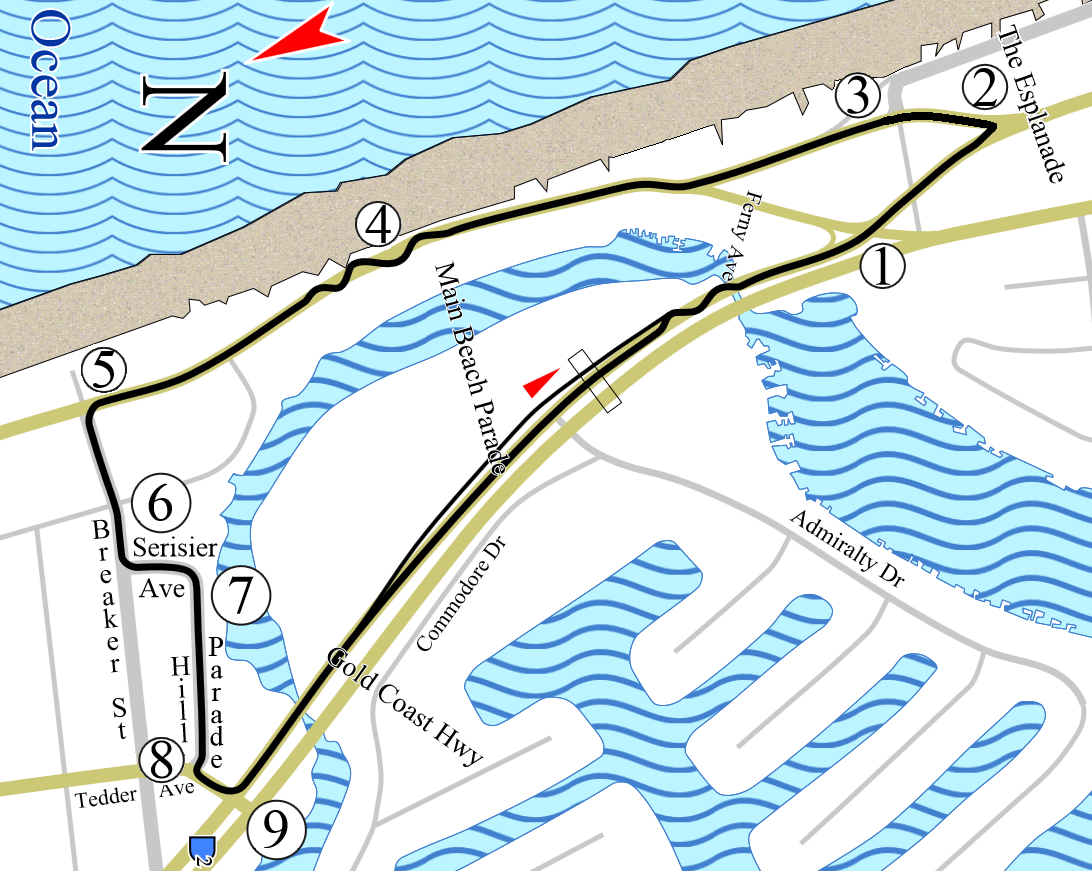
- Layout of the Surfers Paradise Circuit
- Date: 23–25 October 2026
- Location: Gold Coast, Queensland
- Venue: Surfers Paradise Street Circuit

Results
Race 1
Distance	85 laps	250 km
Race 2
Distance	85 laps	250 km

The 2026 Gold Coast 500 (known for commercial reasons as the 2026 Boost Mobile Gold Coast 500) is a motor racing event for Supercars that will be held on 23–25 October 2026 at the Surfers Paradise Street Circuit in the Gold Coast, Queensland, Australia. The round consists of two 250km races and is the twelfth round of the 2026 Supercars Championship, and also marks the beginning of the 2026 Supercars Finals Series.

== Background ==
The event will be held on the weekend of 24–26 October 2026. It is the 32nd Supercars event held at the Surfers Paradise Street Circuit in the Gold Coast and will consist of two 250km races. It is held at the 15th running of the Gold Coast 500 and the 5th running as a single-driver event. Prior events had been held as the V8 Supercar Challenge under non-championship and championship status to support the Gold Coast Indy 300.

This event also marked the second year of the Finals Series championship format. This sees the championship's top 10 drivers have their points reset, with the top 7 at the end of the round remaining in contention for the driver's championship. Going into the weekend, Matt Payne of Grove Racing has a lead of 123 points over the 2 time 'Sprint Cup' winner, Broc Feeney racing for Triple Eight Race Engineering.

=== Support Series ===
- V8 SuperUtes (4 races)
- Porsche Carrera Cup Australia (3 races)
- Aussie Racing Cars (3 races)

=== Entry list ===
Twenty four cars are entered into the event — 8 Chevrolet Camaros ZL1, 11 Ford Mustangs S650, and 5 Toyota GR Supra. Two changes occurred prior to the event, with PremiAir Racing dropping Declan Fraser in favour of Erebus Motorsport's Cooper Murray, who intended to join the former from 2027. Due to Cooper leaving the team, the seat was taken by Erebus Motorsport's endurance co-driver Jarrod Hughes, who will make his sprint race debut. David Reynolds has changed his car number from 20 to 48 this weekend for commercial reasons.

== Results ==
=== Qualifying 1 ===
==== Provisional ====
Pos.	No.	Driver	Team	Car	Time	Gap	Notes
1	18	(Australia) Anton De Pasquale	Team 18	Chevrolet Camaro ZL1	1:09.0770		
2	88	(Australia) Broc Feeney	Triple Eight Race Engineering	Ford Mustang S650	1:09.1460	+0.0690	
3	19	(New Zealand) Matt Payne	Grove Racing	Ford Mustang S650	1:09.1514	+0.0744	
4	8	(New Zealand) Andre Heimgartner	Brad Jones Racing	Toyota GR Supra	1:09.1641	+0.0871	
5	1	(Australia) Chaz Mostert	Walkinshaw TWG Racing	Toyota GR Supra	1:09.1874	+0.1104	
6	2	(New Zealand) Ryan Wood	Walkinshaw TWG Racing	Toyota GR Supra	1:09.2669	+0.1899	
7	55	(Australia) Thomas Randle	Tickford Racing	Ford Mustang S650	1:09.2946	+0.2176	
8	26	(Australia) Kai Allen	Grove Racing	Ford Mustang S650	1:09.3683	+0.2913	
9	888	(Australia) Will Brown	Triple Eight Race Engineering	Ford Mustang S650	1:09.2855	+0.2085	2 place grid penalty
10	6	(Australia) Cam Waters	Tickford Racing	Ford Mustang S650	1:09.3764	+0.2994	
11	17	(Australia) Brodie Kostecki	Dick Johnson Racing	Ford Mustang S650	1:09.4152	+0.3382	
12	7	(Australia) James Golding	Blanchard Racing Team	Ford Mustang S650	1:09.4242	+0.3472	
13	10	(Australia) Zach Bates	Matt Stone Racing	Chevrolet Camaro ZL1	1:09.5247	+0.4477	
14	48	(Australia) David Reynolds	Team 18	Chevrolet Camaro ZL1	1:09.5447	+0.4677	
15	96	(Australia) Macauley Jones	Brad Jones Racing	Toyota GR Supra	1:09.5802	+0.5032	
16	3	(Australia) Aaron Cameron	Blanchard Racing Team	Ford Mustang S650	1:09.5950	+0.5180	
17	4	(Australia) Jack Le Brocq	Matt Stone Racing	Chevrolet Camaro ZL1	1:09.6893	+0.6123	
18	99	(Australia) Jarrod Hughes	Erebus Motorsport	Chevrolet Camaro ZL1	1:09.6946	+0.6176	
19	14	(Australia) Cameron Hill	Brad Jones Racing	Toyota GR Supra	1:09.7408	+0.6638	
20	36	(Australia) Cooper Murray	PremiAir Racing	Chevrolet Camaro ZL1	1:09.8520	+0.7750	
21	38	(Australia) Rylan Gray	Dick Johnson Racing	Ford Mustang S650	1:09.8789	+0.8019	
22	9	(Australia) Jobe Stewart	Erebus Motorsport	Chevrolet Camaro ZL1	1:10.0384	+0.9614	
23	31	(Australia) Jayden Ojeda	PremiAir Racing	Chevrolet Camaro ZL1	1:10.1727	+1.0957	
24	11	(Australia) Jackson Walls	Triple Eight Race Engineering	Ford Mustang S650	1:10.6609	+1.5839	

==== Top-Ten Shoot Out ====
Pos.	No.	Driver	Team	Car	Time	Gap	Grid
1	88	(Australia) Broc Feeney	Triple Eight Race Engineering	Ford Mustang S650	1:11.1369		1
2	1	(Australia) Chaz Mostert	Walkinshaw TWG Racing	Toyota GR Supra	1:11.2623	+ 0.1254	2
3	18	(Australia) Anton De Pasquale	Team 18	Chevrolet Camaro ZL1	1:11.3911	+ 0.2542	3
4	8	(New Zealand) Andre Heimgartner	Brad Jones Racing	Toyota GR Supra	1:11.6223	+ 0.4854	4
5	19	(New Zealand) Matt Payne	Grove Racing	Ford Mustang S650	1:11.8699	+ 0.7330	5
6	55	(Australia) Thomas Randle	Tickford Racing	Ford Mustang S650	1:12.2485	+ 1.1116	6
7	888	(Australia) Will Brown	Triple Eight Race Engineering	Ford Mustang S650	1:12.2546	+ 1.1177	7
8	6	(Australia) Cam Waters	Tickford Racing	Ford Mustang S650	1:12.5155	+ 1.3786	8
9	26	(Australia) Kai Allen	Grove Racing	Ford Mustang S650	1:13.5794	+ 2.4425	9
10	2	(New Zealand) Ryan Wood	Walkinshaw TWG Racing	Toyota GR Supra	no time		10

=== Race 1 ===
Pos.	No.	Driver	Team	Car	Laps	Time/Retired	Grid	Pts
1								
2								
3								
4								
5								
6								
7								
8								
9								
10								
11								
12								
13								
14								
15								
16								
17								
18								
19								
20								
21								
22								
23								

=== Qualifying 2 ===
==== Provisional ====
Pos.	No.	Driver	Team	Car	Time	Gap	Grid
1							Top 10
2							Top 10
3							Top 10
4							Top 10
5							Top 10
6							Top 10
7							Top 10
8							Top 10
9							Top 10
10							Top 10
11							11
12							12
13							13
14							14
15							15
16							16
17							17
18							18
19							19
20							20
21							21
22							22
23							23
24							24

==== Top-Ten Shoot Out ====
Pos.	No.	Driver	Team	Car	Time	Gap	Grid
1							1
2							2
3							3
4							4
5							5
6							6
7							7
8							8
9							9
10							10

=== Race 2 ===
Pos.	No.	Driver	Team	Car	Laps	Time/Retired	Grid	Pts
1								
2								
3								
4								
5								
6								
7								
8								
9								
10								
11								
12								
13								
14								
15								
16								
17								
18								
19								
20								
21								
22								
23								
24								
