= 2026 Australian National Trans Am Series =

Australian motor race competition

The 2026 Australian National Trans Am Series was a national motor racing series conducted using TA2-class cars. The series was organised by the Australian Racing Group and was one of two national racing series conducted using this car class; the other being the TA2 Racing Muscle Car Series. It was sanctioned by Motorsport Australia.

The series commenced at the Mount Panorama Circuit on April 3 as part of the Bathurst 6 Hour support bill, and concluded at Sandown Raceway on November 8. The series was won by Nathan Herne for the third time in the series' history.

== Calendar ==
The following circuits hosted a round of the 2026 championship. A planned event at the Phillip Island Grand Prix Circuit was annulled due to a scheduling conflict with the Supercars Championship. As a result, it would be substituted with a second event at Sandown Raceway.

Rd	Circuit	Dates	Supporting	Maps
1	(New South Wales) Mount Panorama Circuit	3–5 April	Hi-Tec Oils Bathurst 6 Hour; Aussie Racing Car Series; Australian Saloon Car Nationals	2026 Australian National Trans Am Series is located in Australia
2	(Northern Territory) Hidden Valley Raceway	19–21 June	Supercars Championship; Super2 Series; Porsche Carrera Cup Australia	2026 Australian National Trans Am Series is located in Australia
3	(Western Australia) Wanneroo Raceway	31 July–2 August	Supercars Championship; Super2 Series; SuperUtes Series; Radical Cup Australia	2026 Australian National Trans Am Series is located in Australia
4	Queensland Raceway	21–23 August	Supercars Championship; GR Cup; Porsche Carrera Cup Australia; Aussie Racing Car Series	2026 Australian National Trans Am Series is located in Australia
5	(South Australia) The Bend Motorsport Park	11–13 September	Supercars Championship; Porsche Carrera Cup Australia; Touring Car Masters; Aussie Racing Car Series; Australian Prototype Series	2026 Australian National Trans Am Series is located in Australia
6	(Victoria (state)) Sandown Raceway	30 October–1 November	GT4 Australia; Mustang Cup Australia	2026 Australian National Trans Am Series is located in Australia
7	(Victoria (state)) Sandown Raceway	6–8 November	Supercars Championship; Super2 Series; Porsche Sprint Challenge Australia; GR Cup	2026 Australian National Trans Am Series is located in Australia

== Teams and drivers ==
Manufacturer	Car	Team	No.	Driver	Rounds
Chevrolet	Camaro	Robbie Farr Motorsport	7	(Australia) Robbie Farr	1
Chevrolet	Camaro	Garry Rogers Motorsport	8	(Australia) Lachlan Evennett	All
Chevrolet	Camaro	Garry Rogers Motorsport	11	(Australia) Jack Smith	All
Chevrolet	Camaro	Garry Rogers Motorsport	34	(Australia) James Moffat	All
Chevrolet	Camaro	Garry Rogers Motorsport	42	(Australia) Tom Davies	All
Chevrolet	Camaro	Nathan Herne Racing	29	(Australia) Nathan Herne	All
Chevrolet	Camaro	Brock Paine Racing	33	(Australia) Brock Paine	1, 4
Chevrolet	Camaro	Image Racing	36	(Australia) Isaac Demellweek	6–7
Chevrolet	Camaro	Waltec Motorsport	38	(Australia) Tyler Cheney	All
Chevrolet	Camaro	Waltec Motorsport	118	(Australia) Jarrod Hughes	1–6
Chevrolet	Camaro	Marcos Ambrose Motorsport	45	(Australia) Jordan Freestone	1–5
Chevrolet	Camaro	Marcos Ambrose Motorsport	75	(Australia) Elliot Barbour	1–3, 5, 7
Chevrolet	Camaro	C&H Trucking	71	(Australia) Domain Ramsay	1–3, 6–7
Chevrolet	Camaro	Perth Forklift Sales	76	(Australia) Clinton Rayner	3
Chevrolet	Camaro	Matt Stone Racing	89	(Australia) Pat Neville	1, 5
Chevrolet	Camaro	Matt Stone Racing	116	(Australia) Tommy Smith	1, 5
Chevrolet	Camaro	Team Thryv Race For A Cure	92	(Australia) Ben Grice	7
Chevrolet	Camaro	Chevrolet Racing	150	(Australia) Alice Buckley	1, 4
Dodge	Challenger	Haymens/Burleigh Trader	25	(Australia) Coleby Cowham	4
Ford	Mustang	Todd's Garage	1	(Australia) Todd Hazelwood	All
Ford	Mustang	Maverick Performance	2	(Australia) Adam Garwood	1–3
Ford	Mustang	Maverick Performance	2	(Australia) Elliott Cleary	4
Ford	Mustang	Maverick Performance	2	(Australia) Jenson Teleskivi	6
Ford	Mustang	Maverick Performance	2	(Australia) Shae Davies	7
Ford	Mustang	Maverick Performance	10	(Australia) James Golding	1
Ford	Mustang	Maverick Performance	10	(Australia) Tim Blanchard	2–4
Ford	Mustang	Maverick Performance	10	(Australia) Pip Casabene	5
Ford	Mustang	Essential Caravans	4	(Australia) Clay Richards	1–4, 7
Ford	Mustang	Nathan Herne Racing	5	(Australia) Blake Tracey	All
Ford	Mustang	Nathan Herne Racing	60	(Australia) Harrison Sellars	All
Ford	Mustang	The Racing Academy	9	(Australia) Cam Laws	1
Ford	Mustang	DWE Services	9	(Australia) Dwayne West	7
Ford	Mustang	Osbornes Transport	16	(Australia) Joel Heinrich	5
Ford	Mustang	Waltec Motorsport	19	(Australia) Pip Casabane	1
Ford	Mustang	Ashley Jarvis Motorsport	22	(Australia) Cody Brewczynski	1–2, 4–7
Ford	Mustang	Ashley Jarvis Motorsport	22	(Australia) Jason Pryde	3
Ford	Mustang	Ashley Jarvis Motorsport	32	(Australia) Ben Gomersall	1
Ford	Mustang	Ashley Jarvis Motorsport	44	(New Zealand) Ayrton Hodson	6
Ford	Mustang	Ashley Jarvis Motorsport	44	(Australia) Harrison Goodman	7
Ford	Mustang	Image Racing	36	(Australia) Isaac Demellweek	5, 7
Ford	Mustang	Total Parts Pro	54	(Australia) Hayden Hume	4
Ford	Mustang	TFH Racing	63	(Australia) Des Collier	3–7
Ford	Mustang	TFH Racing	66	(Australia) Des Collier	1
Ford	Mustang	Paul Morris Motorsport	67	(Australia) Nash Morris	4
Ford	Mustang	Bargwanna Motorsport	97	(Australia) Ben Bargwanna	All
Ford	Mustang	Triple Eight Race Engineering	888	(Australia) Oli Wickham	7

== Results and standings ==
=== Season summary ===
Rd	Race	Circuit	Pole position	Fastest lap	Winning driver	Winning team	Winning car
1	1	(New South Wales) Mount Panorama Circuit	(Australia) Todd Hazelwood	(Australia) Nathan Herne	(Australia) Nathan Herne	Nathan Herne Racing	Chevrolet Camaro
1	2	(New South Wales) Mount Panorama Circuit		(Australia) Nathan Herne	(Australia) Nathan Herne	Nathan Herne Racing	Chevrolet Camaro
1	3	(New South Wales) Mount Panorama Circuit		(Australia) Jarrod Hughes	(Australia) Nathan Herne	Nathan Herne Racing	Chevrolet Camaro
2	1	(Northern Territory) Hidden Valley Raceway	(Australia) James Moffat	(Australia) Jarrod Hughes	(Australia) James Moffat	Garry Rogers Motorsport	Chevrolet Camaro
2	2	(Northern Territory) Hidden Valley Raceway		(Australia) Jarrod Hughes	(Australia) Blake Tracey	Nathan Herne Racing	Ford Mustang
2	3	(Northern Territory) Hidden Valley Raceway		(Australia) James Moffat	(Australia) Nathan Herne	Nathan Herne Racing	Ford Mustang
3	1	(Western Australia) Wanneroo Raceway	(Australia) Jarrod Hughes	(Australia) Blake Tracey	(Australia) Todd Hazelwood	Todd's Garage	Ford Mustang
3	2	(Western Australia) Wanneroo Raceway		(Australia) Elliot Barbour	(Australia) Jarrod Hughes	Waltec Motorsport	Chevrolet Camaro
3	3	(Western Australia) Wanneroo Raceway		(Australia) Lachlan Evennett	(Australia) Jarrod Hughes	Waltec Motorsport	Chevrolet Camaro
4	1	Queensland Raceway	(Australia) Todd Hazelwood	(Australia) Todd Hazelwood	(Australia) Todd Hazelwood	Todd's Garage	Ford Mustang
4	2	Queensland Raceway		(Australia) Blake Tracey	(Australia) Brock Paine	Brock Paine Racing	Chevrolet Camaro
4	3	Queensland Raceway		(Australia) Nash Morris	(Australia) Nash Morris	Paul Morris Motorsport	Ford Mustang
5	1	(South Australia) The Bend Motorsport Park	(Australia) Nathan Herne	(Australia) Cody Brewczynski	(Australia) Nathan Herne	Nathan Herne Racing	Chevrolet Camaro
5	2	(South Australia) The Bend Motorsport Park		(Australia) Pip Casabene	(Australia) Nathan Herne	Nathan Herne Racing	Chevrolet Camaro
5	3	(South Australia) The Bend Motorsport Park		(Australia) Nathan Herne	(Australia) Nathan Herne	Nathan Herne Racing	Chevrolet Camaro
6	1	(Victoria (state)) Sandown Raceway	(New Zealand) Ayrton Hodson	(Australia) Todd Hazelwood	(Australia) Todd Hazelwood	Todd's Garage	Ford Mustang
6	2	(Victoria (state)) Sandown Raceway		(Australia) Lachlan Evennett	(Australia) Nathan Herne	Nathan Herne Racing	Chevrolet Camaro
6	3	(Victoria (state)) Sandown Raceway		(Australia) Nathan Herne	(Australia) Nathan Herne	Nathan Herne Racing	Chevrolet Camaro
7	1	(Victoria (state)) Sandown Raceway	(Australia) James Moffat	(Australia) Nathan Herne	(Australia) Todd Hazelwood	Todd's Garage	Ford Mustang
7	2	(Victoria (state)) Sandown Raceway		(Australia) Todd Hazelwood	(Australia) Todd Hazelwood	Todd's Garage	Ford Mustang
7	3	(Victoria (state)) Sandown Raceway		(Australia) Cody Brewczynski	(Australia) Todd Hazelwood	Todd's Garage	Ford Mustang

=== Championship standings ===
Pos.	Driver	(New South Wales) BAT			(Northern Territory) DAR			(Western Australia) WAN			(Queensland) QUE			(South Australia) BEN			(Victoria (state)) SAN			(Victoria (state)) SAN			Pen	Points
Pos.	Driver	R1	R2	R3	R1	R2	R3	R1	R2	R3	R1	R2	R3	R1	R2	R3	R1	R2	R3	R1	R2	R3	Pen	Points
1	(Australia) Nathan Herne	1	1	1	7	7	1	11	10	3	18	8	4	1	1	1	2	1	1	3	4	Ret		413
2	(Australia) Todd Hazelwood	2	2	15	4	3	4	1	2	Ret	1	14	6	2	2	4	1	3	Ret	1	1	1		387
3	(Australia) Blake Tracey	11	8	6	5	1	DSQ	2	6	8	2	2	2	4	Ret	10	3	4	2	2	2	12		326
4	(Australia) James Moffat	3	3	Ret	1	4	2	4	3	12	20	16	7	3	6	6	6	5	3	6	17	4		308
5	(Australia) Ben Bargwanna	5	6	4	8	Ret	9	8	8	7	9	5	Ret	7	9	5	5	6	4	8	8	6		248
6	(Australia) Jarrod Hughes	6	4	7	2	2	5	3	1	1	12	6	16	Ret	11	12	DSQ	10	11					227
7	(Australia) Lachlan Evennett	25	16	10	14	Ret	16	5	7	2	17	11	5	5	5	2	4	2	5	5	Ret	16		227
8	(Australia) Jack Smith	8	7	20	12	5	3	6	5	13	Ret	10	10	17	Ret	16	8	8	8	4	3	2		216
9	(Australia) Cody Brewczynski	12	11	9	15	10	Ret				4	4	11	6	3	3	9	12	Ret	7	5	14		163
10	(Australia) Tom Davies	7	10	5	6	6	17	9	13	10	6	19	18	11	4	8	Ret	9	Ret	13	6	13		160
11	(Australia) Elliot Barbour	10	9	3	3	8	7	12	14	5				8	7	14				10	15	Ret		142
12	(Australia) Harrison Sellars	16	17	12	10	9	8	16	11	Ret	8	Ret	17	18	12	Ret	11	7	Ret	14	9	5		106
13	(Australia) Tim Blanchard				13	12	13	7	4	4	3	Ret	9											88
14	(Australia) Tyler Cheney	15	25	21	11	16	10	10	17	Ret	5	3	12	13	Ret	DNS	7	Ret	Ret	15	Ret	Ret		85
15	(Australia) Des Collier	21	22	22	16	13	11	15	20	14	16	15	14	15	15	13	14	14	9	Ret	12	8		72
16	(Australia) Clay Richards	26	14	8	Ret	11	6	13	9	6	15	Ret	13							12	16	Ret		65
17	(Australia) James Golding	4	5	2																				61
18	(Australia) Brock Paine	20	15	16							7	1	8											53
19	(Australia) Alice Buckley	13	12	11							14	7	3											52
20	(Australia) Isaac Demellweek													14	10	7	10	Ret	6	Ret	18	15		52
21	(Australia) Jordan Freestone	17	21	19	17	Ret	14	14	15	Ret	11	18	19	12	8	9								48
22	(Australia) Domain Ramsay	22	23	23	18	14	12	Ret	18	Ret							15	15	Ret	16	10	7		44
23	(Australia) Nash Morris										19	12	1											43
24	(Australia) Ben Grice																			11	7	3		42
25	(Australia) Adam Garwood	Ret	18	14	9	15	15	Ret	12	9														34
26	(New Zealand) Ayrton Hodson																12	11	7					24
27	(Australia) Tommy Smith	18	20	17										10	13	11								21
28	(Australia) Elliot Cleary										10	9	15											17
29	(Australia) Shae Davies																			18	11	12		16
30	(Australia) Harrison Goodman																			19	13	9		15
31	(Australia) Pip Casabene	14	13	Ret										9	14	Ret								13
32	(Australia) Jenson Teleskivi																13	13	10					13
33	(Australia) Ben Gomersall	9	Ret	13																				11
34	(Australia) Clinton Rayner							17	16	11														11
35	(Australia) Duane West																			17	14	11		11
36	(Australia) Patrick Neville	24	24	25										16	17	Ret								7
37	(Australia) Oli Wickham																			9	Ret	Ret		7
38	(Australia) Robbie Farr	19	19	18																				6
39	(Australia) Hayden Hume										13	13	Ret											6
40	(Australia) Scott Dornan													Ret	16	15								6
41	(Australia) Jason Pryde							18	19	Ret														4
42	(Australia) Coleby Cowham										21	17	Ret											3
43	(Australia) Cam Laws	23	Ret	24																				2
44	(Australia) Joel Heinrich													DNS	Ret	DNS								0
Pos.	Driver	R1	R2	R3	R1	R2	R3	R1	R2	R3	R1	R2	R3	R1	R2	R3	R1	R2	R3	R1	R2	R3	Pen	Points
Pos.	Driver	(New South Wales) BAT			(Northern Territory) DAR			(Western Australia) WAN			(Queensland) QUE			(South Australia) BEN			(Victoria (state)) SAN			(Victoria (state)) SAN			Pen	Points
