= 2026 Porsche Sprint Challenge Australia =

Motor racing competition

The 2026 Porsche Sprint Challenge Australia (known for commercial reasons as the 2026 Porsche Michelin Sprint Challenge Australia) was a sports car racing series open to drivers of Porsche 911 GT3 Cup cars. The season started at the Phillip Island Grand Prix Circuit on March 27 and concluded at Sandown Raceway on November 8. The reigning champion, Jake Santalucia, would not return to the series to defend his title as he would graduate to the Porsche Carrera Cup Australia category for 2026.

In a close-fought championship that went down to the final round at Sandown, long-time points leader Kobi Williams crashed in the penultimate race due to a delaminating tyre. Unable to score in the last two races, this allowed Lincoln Taylor to overhaul the points deficit and win the championship. Anthony Gilbertson meanwhile dominated the Pro-Am class, wrapping up the championship with more than a round to spare.

== Calendar ==
The following circuits hosted a round of the 2026 championship.

Rd	Circuit	Dates	Event	Maps
1	(Victoria (state)) Phillip Island Grand Prix Circuit (Phillip Island, Victoria)	27–29 March	GT World Challenge Australia; GT4 Australia Series; Ferrari Challenge Australasia; Mustang Cup Australia	2026 Porsche Sprint Challenge Australia is located in Australia
2	The Bend Motorsport Park (Tailem Bend, South Australia)	8–10 May	GT World Challenge Australia; GT4 Australia Series; Ferrari Challenge Australasia; Mustang Cup Australia	2026 Porsche Sprint Challenge Australia is located in Australia
3	Queensland Raceway (Ipswich, Queensland)	12–14 June	GT World Challenge Australia; GT4 Australia Series; Mustang Cup Australia; Radical Cup Australia	2026 Porsche Sprint Challenge Australia is located in Australia
4	Reid Park Street Circuit (Townsville, Queensland)	10–12 July	Supercars Championship; Aussie Racing Car Series; Touring Car Masters; GR Cup	2026 Porsche Sprint Challenge Australia is located in Australia
5	Sydney Motorsport Park (Eastern Creek, New South Wales)	18–20 September	GT World Challenge Australia; GT4 Australia Series; Ferrari Challenge Australasia; Mustang Cup Australia; Radical Cup Australia	2026 Porsche Sprint Challenge Australia is located in Australia
6	(Victoria (state)) Sandown Raceway (Melbourne, Victoria)	6–8 November	Supercars Championship; Super2 Series; Australian National Trans Am Series; GR Cup	2026 Porsche Sprint Challenge Australia is located in Australia

== Teams and drivers ==
Entrant	No	Driver	Class	Rounds
TekworkX Motorsport	2	(Australia) Josh Thomas	P	1–2
TekworkX Motorsport	2	(Australia) Diesel Thomas	P	3–4
TekworkX Motorsport	3	(Australia) Diesel Thomas	P	1–2
TekworkX Motorsport	11	(Australia) Eric Constantinidis	PA	1–4
TekworkX Motorsport	29	(Australia) Lincoln Evans	P	All
TekworkX Motorsport	78	(Australia) Lincoln Taylor	P	All
Tyler Greenbury Racing	5	(Australia) Ryan Suhle	P	3–6
Tyler Greenbury Racing	57	(Australia) Brandon Madden	P	1–2
Tyler Greenbury Racing	94	(Australia) Kobi Williams	P	All
McElrea Racing	7	(Australia) Kamal Mrad	P	1–5
McElrea Racing	14	(Australia) Kent Leicester	PA	All
McElrea Racing	19	(Australia) Anthony Gilbertson	PA	All
McElrea Racing	24	(Australia) Daniel Quimby	P	All
McElrea Racing	51	(Australia) Tim Farrell	PA	All
Team MPC	9	(Australia) Marc Cini	PA	4
Pinnacle Road & Race Works	16	(Australia) Jesse Lacey	P	1
Sonic Motor Racing Services	22	(Australia) Ruairi Avern	P	All
Sonic Motor Racing Services	55	(Australia) Xavier Avramides	P	All
Sonic Motor Racing Services	81	(Malaysia) Hayden Haikal	P	All
Jones Motorsport	25	(Australia) Ben Taylor	P	1–4
Jones Motorsport	39	(Australia) James Lodge	P	2
Jones Motorsport	69	(New Zealand) Hunter Robb	P	All
Jones Motorsport	272	(Australia) Mark Darling	PA	1, 3–6
Willani Investments	35	(South Africa) Indiran Padayachee	PA	1–2, 4
Lewis Motorsport	47	(Australia) Stephen Moylan	PA	All
GWR	56	(Australia) John McInnes	PA	1–2, 5
Wanless	75	(Australia) Dean Wanless	PA	All
Team Tarburg / EBM	91	(Australia) Lachlan Harburg	PA	1
Team Tarburg / EBM	911	(Australia) Oscar Targett	P	4
Entertainment Park	96	(Australia) John Papantoniou	PA	1–3, 5–6

Icon	Class
P	Pro Cup
PA	Pro-Am Cup
	Guest Starter

== Results and standings ==
=== Season summary ===
Rd	Race	Circuit	Pole Position	Fastest Lap	Drivers' Winner	Teams' Winner	Pro-Am Winner
1	1	(Victoria (state)) Phillip Island Grand Prix Circuit	(New Zealand) Hunter Robb	(Australia) Kobi Williams	(New Zealand) Hunter Robb	Jones Motorsport	(Australia) Anthony Gilbertson
1	2	(Victoria (state)) Phillip Island Grand Prix Circuit		(New Zealand) Hunter Robb	(New Zealand) Hunter Robb	Jones Motorsport	(Australia) Anthony Gilbertson
1	3	(Victoria (state)) Phillip Island Grand Prix Circuit		(Australia) Kobi Williams	(Australia) Kobi Williams	Tyler Greenbury Racing	(Australia) Anthony Gilbertson
2	1	(South Australia) The Bend Motorsport Park	(Malaysia) Hayden Haikal	(Australia) Kamal Mrad	(Australia) Xavier Avramides	Sonic Motor Racing Services	(Australia) Anthony Gilbertson
2	2	(South Australia) The Bend Motorsport Park		(Australia) Kobi Williams	(Malaysia) Hayden Haikal	Sonic Motor Racing Services	(Australia) Eric Constantinidis
2	3	(South Australia) The Bend Motorsport Park		(Australia) Daniel Quimby	(Australia) Kobi Williams	Tyler Greenbury Racing	(Australia) Anthony Gilbertson
3	1	Queensland Raceway	(Malaysia) Hayden Haikal	(Malaysia) Hayden Haikal	(New Zealand) Hunter Robb	Jones Motorsport	(Australia) Anthony Gilbertson
3	2	Queensland Raceway		(New Zealand) Hunter Robb	(Australia) Lincoln Taylor	TekworkX Motorsport	(Australia) Anthony Gilbertson
3	3	Queensland Raceway		(Australia) Kobi Williams	(Australia) Lincoln Taylor	TekworkX Motorsport	(Australia) Anthony Gilbertson
4	1	(Queensland) Reid Park Street Circuit	(Australia) Kobi Williams	(Australia) Ryan Suhle	(Australia) Kobi Williams	Tyler Greenbury Racing	(Australia) Anthony Gilbertson
4	2	(Queensland) Reid Park Street Circuit		(Australia) Kobi Williams	(Australia) Ryan Suhle	Tyler Greenbury Racing	(Australia) Anthony Gilbertson
4	3	(Queensland) Reid Park Street Circuit		(Malaysia) Hayden Haikal	(Australia) Kobi Williams	Tyler Greenbury Racing	(Australia) Anthony Gilbertson
5	1	(New South Wales) Sydney Motorsport Park	(Australia) Kobi Williams	(Australia) Kobi Williams	(Australia) Kobi Williams	Tyler Greenbury Racing	(Australia) Anthony Gilbertson
5	2	(New South Wales) Sydney Motorsport Park		(Australia) Lincoln Taylor	(Australia) Lincoln Taylor	TekworkX Motorsport	(Australia) Stephen Moylan
5	3	(New South Wales) Sydney Motorsport Park		(Australia) Kobi Williams	(Australia) Xavier Avramides	Sonic Motor Racing Services	(Australia) Anthony Gilbertson
6	1	(Victoria (state)) Sandown Raceway	(Australia) Kobi Williams	(Australia) Xavier Avramides	(Australia) Kobi Williams	Tyler Greenbury Racing	(Australia) Anthony Gilbertson
6	2	(Victoria (state)) Sandown Raceway		(New Zealand) Hunter Robb	(Australia) Lincoln Taylor	TekworkX Motorsport	(Australia) Tim Farrell
6	3	(Victoria (state)) Sandown Raceway		(Australia) Daniel Quimby	(Malaysia) Hayden Haikal	Sonic Motor Racing Services	(Australia) Anthony Gilbertson

=== Championship standings ===
==== Pro standings ====
Pos.	Driver	(Victoria (state)) PHI			(South Australia) BEN			(Queensland) QUE			(Queensland) TOW			(New South Wales) SYD			(Victoria (state)) SAN			Pts
Pos.	Driver	R1	R2	R3	R1	R2	R3	R1	R2	R3	R1	R2	R3	R1	R2	R3	R1	R2	R3	Pts
1	(Australia) Lincoln Taylor	3	2	9	12	7	9	2	1	1	3	4	5	2	1	7	4	1	3	754
2	(Australia) Kobi Williams	10	6	1	9	4	1	4	4	2	1	2	1	1	2	5	1	Ret	DNS	734
3	(Australia) Xavier Avramides	6	4	2	1	5	3	3	3	3	8	6	9	9	5	1	2	3	2	728
4	(New Zealand) Hunter Robb	1	1	10	7	3	4	1	2	6	4	3	3	5	4	8	5	12	6	708
5	(Malaysia) Hayden Haikal	12	8	3	4	1	6	9	Ret	DNS	6	12	6	3	3	2	3	2	1	608
6	(Australia) Daniel Quimby	4	5	Ret	5	9	5	Ret	7	4	10	7	4	4	7	4	6	13	5	516
7	(Australia) Ruairi Avern	11	13	5	8	6	8	7	6	7	9	9	11	7	8	6	11	5	9	504
8	(Australia) Kamal Mrad	2	3	7	3	12	7	6	11	8	5	8	7	10	9	9				476
9	(Australia) Ryan Suhle							5	5	5	2	1	2	6	6	3	8	4	4	468
10	(Australia) Lincoln Evans	Ret	11	6	10	10	10	10	10	9	11	11	12	8	10	10	7	6	7	430
11	(Australia) Diesel Thomas	5	7	Ret	6	11	13	11	8	10	12	10	10							278
12	(Australia) Ben Taylor	8	10	8	14	13	12	8	9	11	13	Ret	DNS							229
13	(Australia) James Lodge				2	2	2													150
14	(Australia) Josh Thomas	7	9	4	13	14	Ret													125
15	(Australia) Oscar Targett										7	5	8							92
16	(Australia) Brandon Madden	WD	WD	WD	11	8	11													72
17	(Australia) Jesse Lacey	9	12	Ret																46
Pos.	Driver	R1	R2	R3	R1	R2	R3	R1	R2	R3	R1	R2	R3	R1	R2	R3	R1	R2	R3	Pts
Pos.	Driver	(Victoria (state)) PHI			(South Australia) BEN			(Queensland) QUE			(Queensland) TOW			(New South Wales) SYD			(Victoria (state)) SAN			Pts

==== Pro-Am standings ====
Pos.	Driver	(Victoria (state)) PHI			(South Australia) BEN			(Queensland) QUE			(Queensland) TOW			(New South Wales) SYD			(Victoria (state)) SAN			Pts
Pos.	Driver	R1	R2	R3	R1	R2	R3	R1	R2	R3	R1	R2	R3	R1	R2	R3	R1	R2	R3	Pts
1	(Australia) Anthony Gilbertson	1	1	1	1	2	1	1	1	1	1	1	1	1	Ret	1	1	2	1	1000
2	(Australia) Stephen Moylan	3	2	3	3	4	2	7	2	3	3	Ret	DNS	2	1	3	5	5	3	688
3	(Australia) Kent Leicester	9	9	6	6	7	3	5	5	4	6	3	7	4	3	Ret	4	3	6	584
4	(Australia) Tim Farrell	4	4	8	2	5	Ret	2	Ret	DNS	2	2	2	8	WD	WD	2	1	2	572
5	(Australia) Dean Wanless	5	Ret	DNS	5	8	4	Ret	Ret	2	8	4	3	3	2	2	3	4	5	542
6	(Australia) John Papantoniou	Ret	8	9	7	6	5	3	3	5				5	6	5	6	6	4	468
7	(Australia) Mark Darling	8	7	10				4	4	6	9	Ret	6	7	5	6	7	DNS	7	400
8	(Australia) John McInnes	Ret	6	7	4	3	Ret							6	4	4				244
9	(Australia) Eric Constantinidis	7	Ret	2	Ret	1	Ret	6	Ret	DNS	4	Ret	DNS							208
10	(South Africa) Indiran Padayachee	6	5	4	Ret	Ret	Ret				7	5	5							200
11	(Australia) Lachlan Harburg	2	3	5																126
12	(Australia) Marc Cini										5	Ret	4							70
Pos.	Driver	R1	R2	R3	R1	R2	R3	R1	R2	R3	R1	R2	R3	R1	R2	R3	R1	R2	R3	Pts
Pos.	Driver	(Victoria (state)) PHI			(South Australia) BEN			(Queensland) QUE			(Queensland) TOW			(New South Wales) SYD			(Victoria (state)) SAN			Pts

== See also ==
- 2026 Porsche Carrera Cup Australia
