= 2027 New Zealand Formula Ford Championship =

Motor racing competition

The 2027 New Zealand Formula Ford Championship (known for commercial reasons as the 2026 NAPA Auto Parts New Zealand Formula Ford Championship supported by Rodin Cars) is a scheduled motor racing championship for drivers of Formula Ford racing cars. It will be the 56th national series for Formula Fords to be held in New Zealand. The season will begin at Euromarque Motorsport Park on 22 January and will conclude at the same venue on 9 May.

For this season, Formula Ford New Zealand imposed a revised three-class structure designed to bring more existing Formula Fords back onto the grid and create a more affordable entry point for young drivers. Class 1 was designated for cars manufactured from 2000 onwards. Class 2 was for cars manufacturered from 1993 to 1999, as well as all Stealth cars, and Class 3 for all cars manufactured from 1980 to the end of 1992. Rodin Cars would also increase their financial support of the series to the tune of $90,000 NZD. This included a pole position prize pool of $20,000 across all five rounds as well as $70,000 to be shared across all competitors who commit to the full season of racing. The overall champion, as well as the Class 2 champion, will receive a private test at Rodin Motorsport's Mount Lyford facility.

== Calendar ==
The schedule for the 2027 New Zealand Formula Ford season was announced in August 2026.

| Round | Circuit | Date | Supporting | Map of circuit locations |
|---|---|---|---|---|
| 1 | Euromarque Motorsport Park (Christchurch, Canterbury) | 22–24 January | V8 Meeting | 2027 New Zealand Formula Ford Championship is located in New Zealand |
| 2 | Timaru International Motor Raceway (Timaru, Canterbury) | 27–31 January | Truck Meeting | 2027 New Zealand Formula Ford Championship is located in New Zealand |
| 3 | Hampton Downs Motorsport Park (Hampton Downs, Waikato) | 12–14 March | Legends of Speed | 2027 New Zealand Formula Ford Championship is located in New Zealand |
| 4 | Manfeild: Circuit Chris Amon (Feilding, Manawatū District) | 2–4 April | Dan Higgins Feature Race; Super Trucks | 2027 New Zealand Formula Ford Championship is located in New Zealand |
| 5 | Euromarque Motorsport Park (Christchurch, Canterbury) | 7–9 May | Supercars Championship | 2027 New Zealand Formula Ford Championship is located in New Zealand |

== Results and standings ==
=== Season summary ===
| Rnd | | Circuit | Pole position | Fastest lap | Winning driver | Winning team |
|---|---|---|---|---|---|---|
| 1 | R1 | Euromarque Motorsport Park (Christchurch, Canterbury) | | | | |
| 1 | R2 | Euromarque Motorsport Park (Christchurch, Canterbury) | | | | |
| 1 | R3 | Euromarque Motorsport Park (Christchurch, Canterbury) | | | | |
| 1 | R4 | Euromarque Motorsport Park (Christchurch, Canterbury) | | | | |
| 2 | R1 | Timaru International Motor Raceway (Timaru, Canterbury) | | | | |
| 2 | R2 | Timaru International Motor Raceway (Timaru, Canterbury) | | | | |
| 2 | R3 | Timaru International Motor Raceway (Timaru, Canterbury) | | | | |
| 2 | R4 | Timaru International Motor Raceway (Timaru, Canterbury) | | | | |
| 3 | R1 | Hampton Downs Motorsport Park (Hampton Downs, Waikato) | | | | |
| 3 | R2 | Hampton Downs Motorsport Park (Hampton Downs, Waikato) | | | | |
| 3 | R3 | Hampton Downs Motorsport Park (Hampton Downs, Waikato) | | | | |
| 3 | R4 | Hampton Downs Motorsport Park (Hampton Downs, Waikato) | | | | |
| 4 | R1 | Manfeild: Circuit Chris Amon (Feilding, Manawatū District) | | | | |
| 4 | R2 | Manfeild: Circuit Chris Amon (Feilding, Manawatū District) | | | | |
| 4 | R3 | Manfeild: Circuit Chris Amon (Feilding, Manawatū District) | | | | |
| 4 | R4 | Manfeild: Circuit Chris Amon (Feilding, Manawatū District) | | | | |
| 5 | R1 | Euromarque Motorsport Park (Christchurch, Canterbury) | | | | |
| 5 | R2 | Euromarque Motorsport Park (Christchurch, Canterbury) | | | | |
| 5 | R3 | Euromarque Motorsport Park (Christchurch, Canterbury) | | | | |
| 5 | R4 | Euromarque Motorsport Park (Christchurch, Canterbury) | | | | |

=== Championship standings ===
| Pos. | Driver | RUA1 | | | | TIM | | | | HAM | | | | MAN | | | | RUA2 | | | | Points |
| Pos. | Driver | R1 | R2 | R3 | R4 | R1 | R2 | R3 | R4 | R1 | R2 | R3 | R4 | R1 | R2 | R3 | R4 | R1 | R2 | R3 | R4 | Points |
|---|---|---|---|---|---|---|---|---|---|---|---|---|---|---|---|---|---|---|---|---|---|---|
| | (New Zealand) Nixon Cripps | | | | | | | | | | | | | | | | | | | | | |
| | (Australia) Sebastian Eskandari-Marandi | | | | | | | | | | | | | | | | | | | | | |
| | (New Zealand) Lilly Flashman | | | | | | | | | | | | | | | | | | | | | |
| Pos. | Driver | R1 | R2 | R3 | R4 | R1 | R2 | R3 | R4 | R1 | R2 | R3 | R4 | R1 | R2 | R3 | R4 | R1 | R2 | R3 | R4 | Points |
| Pos. | Driver | RUA1 | | | | TIM | | | | HAM | | | | MAN | | | | RUA2 | | | | Points |
