= 2026 SuperUtes Series =

Motor racing competition

The 2026 V8 SuperUtes Series (known for commercial reasons as the 2026 Tyrepower V8 SuperUtes Series) is a motor racing competition for V8 SuperUtes. It is the eighth running of the SuperUtes Series. The season started at Sydney Motorsport Park on 20 February and will conclude at the Adelaide Street Circuit on 29 November.

David Sieders will enter the season as the defending champion.

== Calendar ==
The following circuits are due to host a round of the 2026 championship.

Rd	Circuit	Dates	Supporting	Maps
1	(New South Wales) Sydney Motorsport Park	20–22 February	Supercars Championship; Super2 Series; GR Cup	2026 SuperUtes Series is located in Australia
2	(Tasmania) Symmons Plains Raceway	22–24 May	Supercars Championship; Aussie Racing Car Series	2026 SuperUtes Series is located in Australia
3	(Western Australia) Wanneroo Raceway	31 July—2 August	Supercars Championship; Super2 Series; Trans Am Series	2026 SuperUtes Series is located in Australia
4	(New South Wales) Mount Panorama Circuit	8–11 October	Supercars Championship; Super2 Series; GR Cup; Porsche Carrera Cup Australia	2026 SuperUtes Series is located in Australia
5	(Queensland) Surfers Paradise Street Circuit	23–25 October	Supercars Championship; Porsche Carrera Cup Australia; Aussie Racing Car Series	2026 SuperUtes Series is located in Australia
6	(South Australia) Adelaide Street Circuit	26–29 November	Supercars Championship; Super2 Series; Porsche Carrera Cup Australia	2026 SuperUtes Series is located in Australia

== Entries ==
All Entries use a Chevrolet LS3 V8

Manufacturer	Model	Entrant	No.	Driver	Rounds
Ford	Ranger	Greyhound Finance	3	(Australia) Michael Clark	3
Ford	Ranger	Apogee Motorsport	8	(Australia) Jason Norris	3–5
Ford	Ranger	Apogee Motorsport	26	(Australia) Luke Webber	3–5
Ford	Ranger	Greyhound Finance	21	(Australia) Jordan Freestone	1
Ford	Ranger	Anytime Finance Racing	31	(Australia) Brock Stinson	2
Ford	Ranger	Allgate Motorsport	49	(Australia) Chris Formosa	1–5
Ford	Ranger	Jan Jones Real Estate	444	(Australia) Shaun Richardson	5
Holden	Colorado	Apogee Motorsport	22	(Australia) Jonathon Hanbury	1–5
Holden	Colorado	Apogee Motorsport	333	(Australia) Rossi Johnson	1–5
Holden	Colorado	Team Forty One	41	(Australia) Adrian Cottrell	1, 3–5
Isuzu	D-Max (RG)	Sieders Racing Team	4	(Australia) Aaron Borg	1–5
Isuzu	D-Max (RG)	Sieders Racing Team	15	(Australia) Adam Marjoram	1–5
Isuzu	D-Max (RG)	EFS 4x4 Accessories	7	(Australia) Cameron Crick	1–2
Isuzu	D-Max (RG)	EFS 4x4 Accessories	7	(Australia) Grant Johnson	3–5
Mazda	BT-50 (TF)	Sieders Racing Team	1	(Australia) David Sieders	1–5
Mazda	BT-50 (TF)	Sieders Racing Team	111	(Australia) Ruben Dan	1–5
Mazda	BT-50 (TF)	Western Sydney Motorsport	18	(Australia) Cody Brewczynski	1–5
Mazda	BT-50 (TF)	EFS 4x4 Accessories	68	(Australia) Hudson James	1–5
Mitsubishi	Triton	Sieders Racing Team	3	(Australia) Ashton Sieders	2
Mitsubishi	Triton	Sieders Racing Team	33	(Australia) Sean Evans	1–5
Mitsubishi	Triton	My Construct Racing	21	(Australia) Matt Nolan	4–5
Mitsubishi	Triton	Briteforce Racing	28	(Australia) Anthony Jewell	3
Mitsubishi	Triton	Jack Westbury Racing	29	(Australia) Jack Westbury	1–5
Mitsubishi	Triton	Michael Sherwell Racing	55	(Australia) Michael Sherwell	1–3, 5
Mitsubishi	Triton	Uniden	78	(Australia) Richard Mork	1
Toyota	Hilux	Apogee Motorsport	8	(Australia) Jason Norris	1–2
Toyota	Hilux	Jaybro Group	13	(Australia) Jay Byrne	5
Toyota	Hilux	Western Sydney Motorsport	64	(Australia) Craig Woods	1–5
Toyota	Hilux	Western Sydney Motorsport	88	(Australia) Justin Ruggier	1–5
Toyota	Hilux	Wheelnutz Garage	79	(Australia) Richard Mork	2–5
Toyota	Hilux	Statewide Bearings	89	(Australia) Braydan Willmington	4
Toyota	Hilux	JWL Racing	96	(Australia) Brad Vereker	1
Toyota	Hilux	AIV Racing	805	(Australia) Jensen Engelhardt	1–5

== Results and standings ==
=== Summary ===
Rd	Race	Event	Pole position	Fastest lap	Winning driver	Winning team	Round Winner
1	R1	(New South Wales) Eastern Creek	(Australia) Cody Brewczynski	(Australia) Cody Brewczynski	(Australia) Cody Brewczynski	Western Sydney Motorsport	(Australia) Cameron Crick
1	R2	(New South Wales) Eastern Creek		(Australia) Justin Ruggier	(Australia) Adam Marjoram	Sieders Racing Team	(Australia) Cameron Crick
1	R3	(New South Wales) Eastern Creek		(Australia) Cody Brewczynski	(Australia) Adam Marjoram	Sieders Racing Team	(Australia) Cameron Crick
1	R4	(New South Wales) Eastern Creek		(Australia) Cameron Crick	(Australia) Aaron Borg	Sieders Racing Team	(Australia) Cameron Crick
2	R1	(Tasmania) Symmons Plains	(Australia) Justin Ruggier	(Australia) Hudson James	(Australia) Aaron Borg	Sieders Racing Team	(Australia) Adam Marjoram
2	R2	(Tasmania) Symmons Plains		(Australia) Rossi Johnson	(Australia) Craig Woods	Western Sydney Motorsport	(Australia) Adam Marjoram
2	R3	(Tasmania) Symmons Plains		(Australia) Jack Westbury	(Australia) Cody Brewczynski	Western Sydney Motorsport	(Australia) Adam Marjoram
2	R4	(Tasmania) Symmons Plains		(Australia) Jack Westbury	(Australia) Adam Marjoram	Sieders Racing Team	(Australia) Adam Marjoram
3	R1	(Western Australia) Wanneroo	(Australia) David Sieders	(Australia) David Sieders	(Australia) David Sieders	Sieders Racing Team	(Australia) Adam Marjoram
3	R2	(Western Australia) Wanneroo		(Australia) Adam Marjoram	(Australia) Sean Evans*	Sieders Racing Team	(Australia) Adam Marjoram
3	R3	(Western Australia) Wanneroo		(Australia) David Sieders	(Australia) Adam Marjoram	Sieders Racing Team	(Australia) Adam Marjoram
3	R4	(Western Australia) Wanneroo		(Australia) Justin Ruggier	(Australia) Adam Marjoram	Sieders Racing Team	(Australia) Adam Marjoram
4	R1	(New South Wales) Bathurst	(Australia) David Sieders	(Australia) Cody Brewczynski	(Australia) Cody Brewczynski	Western Sydney Motorsport	(Australia) Adam Marjoram
4	R2	(New South Wales) Bathurst		(Australia) Rossi Johnson	(Australia) Rossi Johnson	Apogee Motorsport	(Australia) Adam Marjoram
4	R3	(New South Wales) Bathurst		(Australia) Adam Marjoram	(Australia) Adam Marjoram	Sieders Racing Team	(Australia) Adam Marjoram
4	R4	(New South Wales) Bathurst		(Australia) Adam Marjoram	(Australia) Adam Marjoram	Sieders Racing Team	(Australia) Adam Marjoram
5	R1	(Queensland) Surfers Paradise	(Australia) Adam Marjoram	(Australia) Justin Ruggier	(Australia) Cody Brewczynski	Western Sydney Motorsport	(Australia) Adam Marjoram
5	R2	(Queensland) Surfers Paradise		(Australia) Adrian Cottrell	(Australia) Jack Westbury	Jack Westbury Racing	(Australia) Adam Marjoram
5	R3	(Queensland) Surfers Paradise		(Australia) Jack Westbury	(Australia) Adam Marjoram	Sieders Racing Team	(Australia) Adam Marjoram
5	R4	(Queensland) Surfers Paradise		(Australia) Adam Marjoram	(Australia) Adam Marjoram	Sieders Racing Team	(Australia) Adam Marjoram
6	R1	(South Australia) Adelaide					
6	R2	(South Australia) Adelaide					
6	R3	(South Australia) Adelaide					
6	R4	(South Australia) Adelaide					

* Anthony Jewell won round 2 at Wanneroo, but was later penalized for illegally warming his tires during the safety car

=== Driver standings ===
Pos.	Driver	(New South Wales) SMP				(Tasmania) SYM				(Western Australia) WAN				(New South Wales) BAT				(Queensland) SUR				(South Australia) ADE	Pen	Points
1	(Australia) Adam Marjoram	6	1	2	3	4	2	2	1	2	2	1	1	2	12	1	1	2	3	1	1		0	1152
2	(Australia) Rossi Johnson	4	2	3	8	6	4	20	6	5	17	9	8	6	1	2	2	7	4	4	4		0	954
3	(Australia) Aaron Borg	8	8	4	1	1	16	5	4	Ret	13	11	13	4	4	14	10	3	2	2	2		0	908
4	(Australia) Jack Westbury	DNS	12	9	4	8	8	3	2	8	3	16	15	18	14	10	5	5	1	3	3		0	847
5	(Australia) Craig Woods	10	9	6	9	7	1	7	5	7	8	6	5	8	5	5	Ret	13	8	11	8		0	847
6	(Australia) David Sieders	2	Ret	5	6	5	3	4	18	1	4	2	2	3	2	13	9	4	Ret	WD	WD		0	833
7	(Australia) Ruben Dan	5	5	7	5	19	13	10	19	10	12	12	10	12	9	6	7	12	9	7	5		0	817
8	(Australia) Justin Ruggier	7	6	16	10	3	Ret	19	8	6	5	4	20	5	3	3	3	6	20	8	10		0	794
9	(Australia) Sean Evans	13	10	10	17	17	14	8	12	9	1	8	6	15	10	8	8	14	11	8	6		0	794
10	(Australia) Cody Brewczynski	1	3	14	7	2	5	1	3	12	6	7	7	1	Ret	19	Ret	1	Ret	WD	WD		0	763
11	(Australia) Hudson James	11	15	11	11	11	17	14	11	17	15	18	12	10	Ret	20	14	11	6	6	9		0	707
12	(Australia) Adrian Cottrell	17	7	13	19					3	7	3	4	7	7	7	4	9	Ret	9	Ret		0	618
13	(Australia) Jensen Engelhardt	18	18	Ret	14	14	11	13	16	16	14	17	16	14	8	11	13	15	10	10	12		0	615
14	(Australia) Jason Norris	DNS	Ret	DNS	DNS	10	7	11	Ret	11	10	14	11	11	6	4	6	10	7	14	Ret		0	558
15	(Australia) Richard Mork	15	Ret	DNS	16	16	12	16	15	20	19	15	21	17	17	16	18	19	15	17	16		0	519
16	(Australia) Michael Sherwell	9	14	8	18	15	10	12	10	13	11	Ret	18					17	12	18	11		0	513
17	(Australia) Jonathon Hanbury	16	16	12	Ret	18	15	18	17	18	Ret	DNS	19	19	18	17	17	22	16	19	17		0	450
18	(Australia) Chris Formosa	Ret	17	Ret	15	13	DNS	15	14	Ret	18	Ret	Ret	16	16	15	16	21	13	16	13		0	421
19	(Australia) Grant Johnson									15	9	5	3	20	11	Ret	Ret	8	5	5	7		0	412
20	(Australia) Cameron Crick	3	4	1	2	9	6	9	7														0	402
21	(Australia) Luke Webber									14	Ret	13	14	9	Ret	12	12	16	18	12	14		0	379
22	(Australia) Matt Nolan													Ret	13	18	15	18	19	13	15		0	206
23	(Australia) Brock Stinson					12	9	6	9														0	168
24	(Australia) Braydan Willmington													13	15	9	11						0	150
25	(Australia) Anthony Jewell									4	16	10	9										0	145
26	(Australia) Brad Vereker	12	11	15	13																		0	140
27	(Australia) Shaun Richardson																	20	14	15	18		0	111
28	(Australia) Jordan Freestone	14	13	DNS	12																		0	100
29	(Australia) Michael Clark									19	Ret	19	17										0	88
30	(Australia) Ashton Sieders					Ret	Ret	17	13														0	72
31	(Australia) Jay Byrne																	DNS	17	20	19		0	70
Pos.	Driver	(New South Wales) SMP				(Tasmania) SYM				(Western Australia) WAN				(New South Wales) BAT				(Queensland) SUR				(South Australia) ADE	Pen	Points
