= 2027 Supercars Championship =

Australian motor racing series

The 2027 Supercars Championship (known for commercial reasons as the 2027 Repco Supercars Championship) will be a motor racing series for Supercars. It will be the twenty-ninth running of the Supercars Championship and the thirty-first series in which Supercars have contested the Australian Touring Car Championship, the premier title in Australian motorsport. It will be the sixty-eighth season of touring car racing in Australia.

== Teams and drivers ==
The following teams and drivers are expected to compete in the 2027 championship.

| Championship entries | | | | | | Endurance entries | |
| Manufacturer | Model | Team | No. | Driver name | Rounds | Co-driver name | Rounds |
|---|---|---|---|---|---|---|---|
| Chevrolet | Camaro ZL1 | Matt Stone Racing | 4 | (Australia) Jack Le Brocq | All | TBA | 10–11 |
| Chevrolet | Camaro ZL1 | Matt Stone Racing | 10 | (Australia) Zach Bates | All | TBA | 10–11 |
| Chevrolet | Camaro ZL1 | Erebus Motorsport | 9 | (Australia) Jobe Stewart | All | TBA | 10–11 |
| Chevrolet | Camaro ZL1 | Erebus Motorsport | 99 | TBA | TBA | TBA | 10–11 |
| Chevrolet | Camaro ZL1 | Team 18 | 18 | TBA | TBA | (Australia) James Courtney | 10–11 |
| Chevrolet | Camaro ZL1 | Team 18 | 20 | TBA | TBA | (Australia) James Courtney | 10–11 |
| Chevrolet | Camaro ZL1 | PremiAir Racing | 31 | (Australia) Jayden Ojeda | All | TBA | TBA |
| Chevrolet | Camaro ZL1 | PremiAir Racing | 36 | (Australia) Cooper Murray | All | TBA | TBA |
| Ford | Mustang S650 | Blanchard Racing Team | 3 | (Australia) Aaron Cameron | All | TBA | TBA |
| Ford | Mustang S650 | Blanchard Racing Team | 7 | (Australia) James Golding | All | TBA | TBA |
| Ford | Mustang S650 | Tickford Racing | 6 | (Australia) Cam Waters | All | (Australia) Mark Winterbottom | 10–11 |
| Ford | Mustang S650 | Tickford Racing | 55 | (Australia) Thomas Randle | All | TBA | TBA |
| Ford | Mustang S650 | Triple Eight Race Engineering | 11 | (Australia) Jackson Walls | All | TBA | TBA |
| Ford | Mustang S650 | Triple Eight Race Engineering | 88 | (Australia) Broc Feeney | All | (Australia) Nick Percat | 10–11 |
| Ford | Mustang S650 | Triple Eight Race Engineering | 888 | (Australia) Will Brown | All | (Australia) Scott Pye | 10–11 |
| Ford | Mustang S650 | Dick Johnson Racing | 17 | (Australia) Brodie Kostecki | All | (Australia) Todd Hazelwood | 10–11 |
| Ford | Mustang S650 | Dick Johnson Racing | 38 | (Australia) Rylan Gray | All | TBA | TBA |
| Ford | Mustang S650 | Grove Racing | 19 | (New Zealand) Matt Payne | All | (Australia) Will Davison | 10–11 |
| Ford | Mustang S650 | Grove Racing | 26 | (Australia) Kai Allen | All | (Australia) Tim Slade | 10–11 |
| Toyota | GR Supra | Walkinshaw TWG Racing | 2 | (New Zealand) Ryan Wood | All | (New Zealand) Jaxon Evans | 10–11 |
| Toyota | GR Supra | Walkinshaw TWG Racing | 25 | (Australia) Chaz Mostert | All | TBA | 10–11 |
| Toyota | GR Supra | Brad Jones Racing | 8 | (New Zealand) Andre Heimgartner | All | TBA | 10–11 |
| Toyota | GR Supra | Brad Jones Racing | 14 | (Australia) Cameron Hill | All | TBA | 10–11 |
| Toyota | GR Supra | Brad Jones Racing | 96 | TBA | All | TBA | TBA |
Wildcard Entries
| Chevrolet | Camaro ZL1 | Team 18 | 15 | TBA | 10–11 | (Australia) Craig Lowndes | 10–11 |

=== Driver changes ===
Cooper Murray was originally slated to join PremiAir Racing for 2027, but joined the team at the 2026 Gold Coast 500, replacing Declan Fraser.

== Calendar ==
The following circuits are scheduled to host a round of the 2027 championship.

| Round | Race | Event | Circuit | Location | Dates | Maps |
| Sprint Cup | | | | | | Maps |
|---|---|---|---|---|---|---|
| 1 | 1 | Sydney Super 440 | (New South Wales) Sydney Motorsport Park | Eastern Creek, New South Wales | 26-28 February | 2027 Supercars Championship is located in Australia |
| 1 | 2 | Sydney Super 440 | (New South Wales) Sydney Motorsport Park | Eastern Creek, New South Wales | 26-28 February | 2027 Supercars Championship is located in Australia |
| 1 | 3 | Sydney Super 440 | (New South Wales) Sydney Motorsport Park | Eastern Creek, New South Wales | 26-28 February | 2027 Supercars Championship is located in Australia |
| 2 | 4 | Tasmania Super 440 | (Tasmania) Symmons Plains Raceway | Launceston, Tasmania | 12-14 March | 2027 Supercars Championship is located in Australia |
| 2 | 5 | Tasmania Super 440 | (Tasmania) Symmons Plains Raceway | Launceston, Tasmania | 12-14 March | 2027 Supercars Championship is located in Australia |
| 2 | 6 | Tasmania Super 440 | (Tasmania) Symmons Plains Raceway | Launceston, Tasmania | 12-14 March | 2027 Supercars Championship is located in Australia |
| 3 | 7 | Melbourne SuperSprint | (Victoria (state)) Albert Park Circuit | Albert Park, Victoria | 1-4 April | 2027 Supercars Championship is located in Australia |
| 3 | 8 | Melbourne SuperSprint | (Victoria (state)) Albert Park Circuit | Albert Park, Victoria | 1-4 April | 2027 Supercars Championship is located in Australia |
| 3 | 9 | Melbourne SuperSprint | (Victoria (state)) Albert Park Circuit | Albert Park, Victoria | 1-4 April | 2027 Supercars Championship is located in Australia |
| 3 | 10 | Melbourne SuperSprint | (Victoria (state)) Albert Park Circuit | Albert Park, Victoria | 1-4 April | 2027 Supercars Championship is located in Australia |
| 4 | 11 | Christchurch Super 440 | (New Zealand) Euromarque Motorsport Park | Christchurch, Canterbury Region | 7-9 May | 2027 Supercars Championship is located in Australia |
| 4 | 12 | Christchurch Super 440 | (New Zealand) Euromarque Motorsport Park | Christchurch, Canterbury Region | 7-9 May | 2027 Supercars Championship is located in Australia |
| 4 | 13 | Christchurch Super 440 | (New Zealand) Euromarque Motorsport Park | Christchurch, Canterbury Region | 7-9 May | 2027 Supercars Championship is located in Australia |
| 6 | 14 | Taupō Super 440 | (New Zealand) Taupō International Motorsport Park | Taupō, Waikato Region | 14-16 May | 2027 Supercars Championship is located in Australia |
| 6 | 15 | Taupō Super 440 | (New Zealand) Taupō International Motorsport Park | Taupō, Waikato Region | 14-16 May | 2027 Supercars Championship is located in Australia |
| 6 | 16 | Taupō Super 440 | (New Zealand) Taupō International Motorsport Park | Taupō, Waikato Region | 14-16 May | 2027 Supercars Championship is located in Australia |
| 6 | 17 | Darwin Triple Crown | (Northern Territory) Hidden Valley Raceway | Darwin, Northern Territory | 18-20 June | 2027 Supercars Championship is located in Australia |
| 6 | 18 | Darwin Triple Crown | (Northern Territory) Hidden Valley Raceway | Darwin, Northern Territory | 18-20 June | 2027 Supercars Championship is located in Australia |
| 6 | 19 | Darwin Triple Crown | (Northern Territory) Hidden Valley Raceway | Darwin, Northern Territory | 18-20 June | 2027 Supercars Championship is located in Australia |
| 7 | 20 | Townsville 500 | (Queensland) Reid Park Street Circuit | Townsville, Queensland | 9-11 July | 2027 Supercars Championship is located in Australia |
| 7 | 21 | Townsville 500 | (Queensland) Reid Park Street Circuit | Townsville, Queensland | 9-11 July | 2027 Supercars Championship is located in Australia |
| 7 | 22 | Townsville 500 | (Queensland) Reid Park Street Circuit | Townsville, Queensland | 9-11 July | 2027 Supercars Championship is located in New Zealand |
| 8 | 23 | Perth Super 440 | (Western Australia) Wanneroo Raceway | Neerabup, Western Australia | 6-8 August | 2027 Supercars Championship is located in New Zealand |
| 8 | 24 | Perth Super 440 | (Western Australia) Wanneroo Raceway | Neerabup, Western Australia | 6-8 August | 2027 Supercars Championship is located in New Zealand |
| 8 | 25 | Perth Super 440 | (Western Australia) Wanneroo Raceway | Neerabup, Western Australia | 6-8 August | 2027 Supercars Championship is located in New Zealand |
| 9 | 26 | Sandown 500 | (Victoria (state)) Sandown Raceway | Springvale, Victoria | 27-29 August | 2027 Supercars Championship is located in New Zealand |
| 9 | 27 | Sandown 500 | (Victoria (state)) Sandown Raceway | Springvale, Victoria | 27-29 August | 2027 Supercars Championship is located in New Zealand |
| Enduro Cup | | | | | | 2027 Supercars Championship is located in New Zealand |
| 10 | 28 | The Bend 500 | (South Australia) The Bend Motorsport Park | Tailem Bend, South Australia | 17-19 September | 2027 Supercars Championship is located in New Zealand |
| 11 | 29 | Bathurst 1000 | (New South Wales) Mount Panorama Circuit | Bathurst, New South Wales | 7-10 October | 2027 Supercars Championship is located in New Zealand |
| Finals Series | | | | | | 2027 Supercars Championship is located in New Zealand |
| 12 | 30 | Gold Coast 500 | (Queensland) Surfers Paradise Street Circuit | Surfers Paradise, Queensland | 22-24 October | 2027 Supercars Championship is located in New Zealand |
| 12 | 31 | Gold Coast 500 | (Queensland) Surfers Paradise Street Circuit | Surfers Paradise, Queensland | 22-24 October | 2027 Supercars Championship is located in New Zealand |
| 13 | 32 | Phillip Island 500 | (Victoria (state)) Phillip Island Grand Prix Circuit | Phillip Island, Victoria | 5-7 November | 2027 Supercars Championship is located in New Zealand |
| 13 | 33 | Phillip Island 500 | (Victoria (state)) Phillip Island Grand Prix Circuit | Phillip Island, Victoria | 5-7 November | 2027 Supercars Championship is located in New Zealand |
| 14 | 34 | Adelaide Grand Final | (South Australia) Adelaide Street Circuit | Adelaide, South Australia | 25-28 November | 2027 Supercars Championship is located in New Zealand |
| 14 | 35 | Adelaide Grand Final | (South Australia) Adelaide Street Circuit | Adelaide, South Australia | 25-28 November | 2027 Supercars Championship is located in New Zealand |
| 14 | 36 | Adelaide Grand Final | (South Australia) Adelaide Street Circuit | Adelaide, South Australia | 25-28 November | 2027 Supercars Championship is located in New Zealand |

=== Calendar changes ===
The Adelaide Grand Final will utilise a new layout, similar to the track that MotoGP will use when they make their debut in 2027.

Phillip Island will return to the calendar for the first time since 2019 taking the spot that was formerly occupied by Sandown in the Finals Series. To make room for Phillip Island, Queensland Raceway lost its spot on the schedule after its return in 2024.

The Darwin Triple Crown will host a night race for the first time.
