= 2026 GR Cup =

Motorsport season

The 2026 GR Cup (known for commercial reasons as the 2026 Toyota Gazoo Racing Australia GR Cup) was a motor racing competition for Toyota 86 race cars. It was the ninth running of the GR Cup. The season started at Sydney Motorsport Park on 20 February and concluded at Sandown Raceway on 8 November.

After a season where six drivers entered the final race with a mathematical chance of winning the championship, Cooper Barnes ultimately emerged as the series' victor.

== Calendar ==
The following circuits hosted a round of the 2026 championship.

Rd	Circuit	Dates	Supporting	Maps
1	(New South Wales) Sydney Motorsport Park	20–22 February	Supercars Championship; Super2 Series; SuperUtes Series; Touring Car Masters	2026 GR Cup is located in Australia
2	(Queensland) Reid Park Street Circuit	10–12 July	Supercars Championship; Aussie Racing Car Series; Touring Car Masters; Porsche Sprint Challenge Australia	2026 GR Cup is located in Australia
3	Queensland Raceway	21–23 August	Supercars Championship; Porsche Carrera Cup Australia; Aussie Racing Car Series	2026 GR Cup is located in Australia
4	(New South Wales) Mount Panorama Circuit	8–11 October	Supercars Championship; Super2 Series; Porsche Carrera Cup Australia; Touring Car Masters; SuperUtes Series	2026 GR Cup is located in Australia
5	(South Australia) Sandown Raceway	6–8 November	Supercars Championship; Super2 Series; Porsche Sprint Challenge Australia	2026 GR Cup is located in Australia

== Teams and drivers ==
Entrant	No	Driver	Rounds
ASAP Trading	2	(Australia) Jenson Teleskivi	All
Sieders Racing Team	3	(Australia) Ashton Sieders	All
Walkinshaw Foundation Academy	5	(Australia) Ayce Buckley	All
Walkinshaw Foundation Academy	19	(Australia) Pip Casabene	All
Walkinshaw Foundation Academy	67	(Australia) Liam Gerges	All
99 Motorsport	14	(Australia) Will Thompson	All
99 Motorsport	99	(New Zealand) Ben Stewart	All
99 Motorsport	222	(New Zealand) Arthur Broughan	3–5
99 Motorsport	777	(Australia) Romeo Nasr	All
Lachlan Gibbons Motorsport	18	(Australia) Lachlan Gibbons	All
Ashton Cattach Racing	22	(Australia) Ashton Cattach	All
Jascott Civil	23	(Australia) Kobe McInerney	1, 3–4
Marsh Height Safety	30	(Australia) Joshua Marsh	All
Stinson Family Racing	31	(Australia) Brock Stinson	All
BJS Workwear/Hard Yakka	36	(Australia) Isaac Demellweek	2–4
Jack Szewczuk Racing	39	(Australia) Jack Szewczuk	1–4
Apogee Motorsport	43	(Australia) Jr-Lung Hay-Bartlem	All
Apogee Motorsport	49	(Australia) Anthony Capobianco	All
JND Racing	46	(Australia) Tommy Roso	All
JND Racing	64	(Australia) Jordan Roso	2–3, 5
JND Racing	155	(Australia) Zane Rinaldi	All
Toyota Gazoo Racing Australia	50	(Australia) Tim Slade	3
Toyota Gazoo Racing Australia	84	(New Zealand) Fabian Coulthard	1
Toyota Gazoo Racing Australia	84	(New Zealand) Chris Pither	2
Toyota Gazoo Racing Australia	84	(Australia) Harry Bresnehan	4
Toyota Gazoo Racing Australia	84	(Australia) Harry Bates	5
Toyota Gazoo Racing Australia	85	(New Zealand) Lee Zeltwanger	4
Toyota Gazoo Racing Australia	86	(New Zealand) Jaxon Evans	1, 5
Toyota Gazoo Racing Australia	86	(Australia) Todd Hazelwood	2
Toyota Gazoo Racing Australia	86	(Australia) Will Davison	3
Toyota Gazoo Racing Australia	86	(Australia) Lewis Bates	4
Hadley Green Investment Group	65	(Australia) Hugh Zochling	All
That Patio Guy	69	(Australia) Charlie Parker	1
Thornsport	71	(Australia) Craig Thornton	1–3
KDL Property Group	77	(Australia) Jett Leicester	3–4
TWC Motorsports	94	(Australia) Jackson Zammit	3–5
Seal's Tyre & Auto	95	(Australia) William Seal	1–4
WeetBix/Supercheap Auto	116	(Australia) Kade Davey	All
BJS Workwear	136	(Australia) Isaac Demellweek	1
Action Motorsport	186	(Australia) Cooper Barnes	All

== Results and standings ==
=== Results ===
Rnd		Circuit	Date	Pole position	Fastest lap	Winning driver	Winning team
1	R1	Sydney Motorsport Park (Eastern Creek, New South Wales)	20–22 February	(Australia) Brock Stinson	(Australia) Brock Stinson	(Australia) Brock Stinson	Stinson Family Racing
1	R2	Sydney Motorsport Park (Eastern Creek, New South Wales)	20–22 February		(Australia) Cooper Barnes	(Australia) Brock Stinson	Stinson Family Racing
1	R3	Sydney Motorsport Park (Eastern Creek, New South Wales)	20–22 February		(Australia) Brock Stinson	(Australia) Brock Stinson	Stinson Family Racing
2	R1	Reid Park Street Circuit (Townsville, Queensland)	10–12 July	(Australia) Brock Stinson	(Australia) Pip Casabene	(Australia) Brock Stinson	Stinson Family Racing
2	R2	Reid Park Street Circuit (Townsville, Queensland)	10–12 July		(Australia) Cooper Barnes	(Australia) Cooper Barnes	Action Motorsport
2	R3	Reid Park Street Circuit (Townsville, Queensland)	10–12 July		(Australia) Cooper Barnes	(Australia) Cooper Barnes	Action Motorsport
3	R1	Queensland Raceway (Ipswich, Queensland)	21–23 August	(New Zealand) Ben Stewart	(Australia) Kade Davey	(Australia) Cooper Barnes	Action Motorsport
3	R2	Queensland Raceway (Ipswich, Queensland)	21–23 August		(Australia) Brock Stinson	(Australia) Brock Stinson	Stinson Family Racing
3	R3	Queensland Raceway (Ipswich, Queensland)	21–23 August		(Australia) Zane Rinaldi	(Australia) Brock Stinson	Stinson Family Racing
4	R1	Mount Panorama Circuit (Bathurst, New South Wales)	8–11 October	(Australia) Liam Gerges	(Australia) Will Thompson	(Australia) Romeo Nasr	99 Motorsport
4	R2	Mount Panorama Circuit (Bathurst, New South Wales)	8–11 October		(Australia) Will Thompson	(Australia) Liam Gerges	Walkinshaw Foundation Academy
4	R3	Mount Panorama Circuit (Bathurst, New South Wales)	8–11 October		(Australia) Will Thompson	(New Zealand) Ben Stewart	99 Motorsport
5	R1	(South Australia) Sandown Raceway (Melbourne, Victoria)	13–15 November	(Australia) Liam Gerges	(Australia) Brock Stinson	(Australia) Will Thompson	99 Motorsport
5	R2	(South Australia) Sandown Raceway (Melbourne, Victoria)	13–15 November		(Australia) Brock Stinson	(Australia) Will Thompson	99 Motorsport
5	R3	(South Australia) Sandown Raceway (Melbourne, Victoria)	13–15 November		(Australia) Pip Casabene	(Australia) Will Thompson	99 Motorsport

=== Standings ===
Pos.	Driver	(New South Wales) SMP			(Queensland) TOW			(Queensland) QUE			(New South Wales) BAT			(Victoria (state)) SAN			Pen	Points
1	(Australia) Cooper Barnes	2	2	3	4	1	1	1	18	21	5	8	6	4	5	5	0	1152
2	(New Zealand) Ben Stewart	10	7	7	3	4	7	2	3	5	3	2	1	8	14	6	0	1130
3	(Australia) Brock Stinson	1	1	1	1	3	25	10	1	1	Ret	14	11	6	3	2	0	1100
4	(Australia) Pip Casabene	9	4	4	2	2	2	6	4	4	8	11	14	9	6	4	0	1098
5	(Australia) Lachlan Gibbons	3	3	2	7	5	4	14	16	23	10	5	8	2	2	3	0	1072
6	(Australia) Will Thompson	5	11	9	9	Ret	20	17	13	22	6	3	2	1	1	1	0	986
7	(Australia) Kade Davey	16	13	10	5	Ret	10	4	2	3	4	6	5	3	21	7	0	958
8	(Australia) Zane Rinaldi	7	17	20	11	7	5	3	5	2	13	7	9	12	23	21	0	924
9	(Australia) Liam Gerges	6	6	6	Ret	18	8	1	11	13	2	1	4	5	4	Ret	0	892
10	(Australia) Ashton Cattach	15	9	14	13	11	15	15	10	11	9	10	12	10	DSQ	14	0	792
11	(Australia) Jr-Lung Hay-Bartlem	17	18	19	19	15	12	9	17	19	20	20	18	11	9	15	0	754
12	(Australia) Anthony Capobianco	14	14	13	10	8	9	16	6	15	DSQ	23	25	22	15	12	0	744
13	(Australia) Jenson Teleskivi	22	19	18	18	14	16	18	12	8	15	12	20	Ret	19	10	0	706
14	(Australia) Romeo Nasr	Ret	15	Ret	12	20	11	5	Ret	16	1	4	3	Ret	18	16	0	688
15	(Australia) Ayce Buckley	Ret	25	23	14	10	13	22	14	10	12	13	10	13	12	20	0	676
16	(Australia) Jack Szewczuk	4	5	5	6	6	3	8	Ret	17	7	Ret	19				0	668
17	(Australia) Isaac Demellweek	11	22	16	15	9	6	13	7	7	19	17	16				0	668
18	(Australia) Joshua Marsh	13	DSQ	21	16	12	Ret	20	20	12	Ret	19	Ret	16	7	8	0	574
19	(Australia) Ashton Sieders	19	16	17	22	21	21	23	Ret	27	23	25	23	15	8	Ret	0	546
20	(Australia) William Seal	23	10	8	Ret	17	18	21	22	18	17	16	22				0	518
21	(New Zealand) Arthur Broughan							12	Ret	14	11	9	4	7	10	9	0	506
22	(Australia) Hugh Zochling	24	24	24	23	23	24	27	23	28	26	27	28	21	22	22	0	498
23	(Australia) Tommy Roso	20	23	Ret	20	19	23	25	Ret	Ret	24	24	27	20	20	19	0	456
24	(Australia) Jackson Zammit							Ret	15	20	22	21	24	14	11	11	0	360
25	(New Zealand) Jaxon Evans	12	8	12										17	13	13	0	342
26	(Australia) Kobe McInerney	21	21	22				24	19	24	14	Ret	17				0	332
27	(Australia) Craig Thornton	8	Ret	15	21	13	19	28	DNS	DNS							0	284
28	(Australia) Jordan Roso				Ret	22	22	26	Ret	26				18	16	17	0	280
29	(Australia) Tim Slade							11	8	9							0	190
30	(Australia) Will Davison							19	9	6							0	178
31	(Australia) Jett Leicester							Ret	21	25	25	26	26				0	164
32	(New Zealand) Lee Zeltwanger										18	15	13				0	154
33	(Australia) Todd Hazelwood				17	16	17										0	146
34	(Australia) Harry Bresnehan										21	18	15				0	138
35	(Australia) Harry Bates													19	17	18	0	138
36	(Australia) Lewis Bates										16	22	21				0	128
37	(New Zealand) Chris Pither				8	Ret	14										0	120
38	(Australia) Charlie Parker	18	12	Ret													0	104
39	(New Zealand) Fabian Coulthard	Ret	20	11													0	102
Pos.	Driver	(New South Wales) SMP			(Queensland) TOW			(Queensland) QUE			(New South Wales) BAT			(Victoria (state)) SAN			Pen	Points
