= 2026 Aussie Racing Car Series =

Motor racing competition

The 2026 Aussie Racing Cars Series (known for commercial reasons as the 2026 Battery World Aussie Racing Cars Super Series) was the 26th year of national competition in Aussie Racing Cars. The series utilised miniature silhouette racing car class, styled as scaled-down versions of sports cars including the Mustang and Camaro used in the Supercars Championship, and powered by a 1300cc motorcycle engine. The season began at the Mount Panorama Circuit on April 3 and concluded on the Surfers Paradise Street Circuit on October 25.

The season marked the arrival of the new Yamaha MT-09 powerplant as used in the Legends Car series'. A number of drivers still retained the Yamaha XJR1300 engine used in previous seasons, and a dispute over engine restrictors led to defending champion, Kody Garland, withdrawing midway through the opening weekend after a bitter dispute with the category management.

== Calendar ==
The following circuits are scheduled to host at least one round throughout the 2026 season.

Rnd	Circuit	Dates	Supporting	Map
1	(New South Wales) Mount Panorama Circuit	3–5 April	Bathurst 6 Hour; Australian National Trans Am Series	2026 Aussie Racing Car Series is located in Australia
2	(Tasmania) Symmons Plains Raceway	22–24 May	Supercars Championship; SuperUtes Series	2026 Aussie Racing Car Series is located in Australia
3	(Queensland) Reid Park Street Circuit	10–12 July	Supercars Championship; GR Cup; Porsche Sprint Challenge Australia	2026 Aussie Racing Car Series is located in Australia
4	Queensland Raceway	21–23 August	Supercars Championship; GR Cup; Porsche Carrera Cup Australia; Australian National Trans Am Series	2026 Aussie Racing Car Series is located in Australia
5	(South Australia) The Bend Motorsport Park	11–13 September	Supercars Championship; Porsche Carrera Cup Australia; Australian National Trans Am Series	2026 Aussie Racing Car Series is located in Australia
6	(Queensland) Surfers Paradise Street Circuit	23–25 October	Supercars Championship; SuperUtes Series; Porsche Carrera Cup Australia	2026 Aussie Racing Car Series is located in Australia

== Teams and drivers ==
Manufacturer	Model	Entrant	No.	Driver	Rounds
Holden	Commodore	Chicane Motorsports	67	(Australia) Richard Knight	2
Chevrolet	Camaro	Riskie Racing	4	(Australia) Scott Andriske	All
Chevrolet	Camaro	PCA Racing	14	(Australia) Matt Gooding	1–2, 4
Chevrolet	Camaro	PCA Racing	14	(Australia) Reece Chapman	3
Chevrolet	Camaro	Team Grand Racing	17	(Australia) Dennis Butler	3–4, 6
Chevrolet	Camaro	Corish Motorsports	18	(Australia) Diesel Thomas	All
Chevrolet	Camaro	Corish Motorsports	35	(Australia) Brendon Tucker	5–6
Chevrolet	Camaro	Action Line Marking	23	(Australia) Scott Dornan	2–3
Chevrolet	Camaro	Jeff Horsey Solicitor	27	(Australia) Kyle Lovering	4
Chevrolet	Camaro	Chicane Motorsports	28	(New Zealand) Ayrton Hodson	1
Chevrolet	Camaro	Chicane Motorsports	69	(Australia) Cody McKay	All
Chevrolet	Camaro	Team 33 Racing	33	(Australia) Andrew Hamilton	3–4, 6
Chevrolet	Camaro	Motorsport 25	47	(Australia) Troy Jones	6
Chevrolet	Camaro	Ballarat Performance Auto	55	(Australia) Nathan Barber	5
Chevrolet	Camaro	Axil Coffee	65	(Australia) David Makin	3
Chevrolet	Camaro	Koan Solutions - Crete & Works	91	(Australia) Anthony DiMauro	All
Chevrolet	Camaro	TFH Racing	94	(Australia) Kobi Williams	6
Chevrolet	Camaro	Barrington Motorsports	177	(Australia) Jaxon Barrington	1–3
Ford	Falcon	Bridge Windscreens	153	(Australia) Jacob Paige	5
Ford	Mustang	Kody Garland Racing	1	(Australia) Kody Garland	1
Ford	Mustang	TFH Racing	3	(Australia) Josh Thomas	4–6
Ford	Mustang	TFH Racing	63	(Australia) Des Collier	6
Ford	Mustang	TFH Racing	777	(Australia) Jarrod Keyte	1
Ford	Mustang	TFH Racing	777	(Australia) Chris Tippett	2
Ford	Mustang	Corish Motorsports	7	(Australia) Les Corish	1
Ford	Mustang	Corish Motorsports	28	(New Zealand) Ayrton Hodson	2–3
Ford	Mustang	Corish Motorsports	51	(Australia) Oscar Pedersen	1–3, 5
Ford	Mustang	Corish Motorsports	66	(New Zealand) Ayrton Hodson	4
Ford	Mustang	Corish Motorsports	81	(Australia) Matthew Basso	2–6
Ford	Mustang	Corish Motorsports	87	(Australia) Andrew Corish	1–5
Ford	Mustang	Corish Motorsports	87	(Australia) Sam Simpson	6
Ford	Mustang	Corish Motorsports	333	(Australia) Rossi Johnson	All
Ford	Mustang	Reynovate Construction	9	(Australia) Ryan Reynolds	2
Ford	Mustang	Heinrich Racing	16	(Australia) Brad Gartner	5
Ford	Mustang	O'Keefe Motorsports	22	(Australia) Scott O'Keefe	1, 3–4, 6
Ford	Mustang	Action Linemarking	23	(Australia) Scott Dornan	5
Ford	Mustang	Motorsport 25	25	(Australia) Chad Chapman	1–3, 5–6
Ford	Mustang	Motorsport 25	25	(Australia) Bradi Owen	4
Ford	Mustang	Speedvision / Air Everywhere	26	(Australia) Jacob Currie	5
Ford	Mustang	Norganics Protein	28	(Australia) Kent Quinn	4
Ford	Mustang	Norganics Protein	101	(Australia) Caleb Paterson	4
Ford	Mustang	Western Sydney Motorsport	44	(Australia) Jon Stefensen	6
Ford	Mustang	Western Sydney Motorsport	64	(Australia) Craig Woods	1
Ford	Mustang	Western Sydney Motorsport	72	(Australia) Craig Thompson	2–3, 6
Ford	Mustang	Western Sydney Motorsport	78	(Australia) Grant Thompson	3, 6
Ford	Mustang	Riskie Racing	57	(Australia) Brandon Madden	2–6
Ford	Mustang	Kyle Ensbey Motorsport	49	(Australia) Kyle Ensbey	6
Ford	Mustang	Axil Coffee	65	(Australia) David Makin	5
Ford	Mustang	Competition Coatings	95	(Australia) Nathan Williams	1–4, 6
Ford	Mustang	Applied Engineering Analysis	96	(Australia) Jeff Waters	All
Ford	Mustang	CNH Racing	195	(Australia) Hayden Nissen	1–4, 6
Ford	Mustang	Scott Taylor Motorsport	222	(Australia) Scott Taylor	6
Ford	Mustang	Kart Mania	230	(Australia) William Rowe	5–6
Ford	Mustang	Axial Wealth Management	558	(Australia) Jed Murphy	6
Ford	Mustang	CXC Racing	888	(Australia) Josh Thomas	1
Ford	Mustang	CXC Racing	888	(Australia) Ruben Dan	2
Ford	Mustang	CXC Racing	888	(Australia) Dylan Thomas	3
Ford	Mustang	CXC Racing	888	(Australia) Jarrod Keyte	4
Ford	Mustang	CXC Racing	888	(Australia) Joe Andriske	5
Ford	Mustang	CXC Racing	888	(Australia) Brock Paine	6
Toyota	Aurion	Mable Technologies	15	(Australia) Emma Clark	6
Toyota	Aurion	Boyd Racing	38	(Australia) Jack Boyd	1, 3, 5
Toyota	Aurion	ASAP Marketing	48	(Australia) Keith Bensley	1
Toyota	Aurion	Kart Mania	230	(Australia) William Rowe	1–4

== Results and standings ==
=== Season summary ===
Rnd		Circuit	Pole position	Fastest lap	Winning driver	Winning team
1	R1	Mount Panorama Circuit (Bathurst, New South Wales)	(Australia) Kody Garland	(Australia) Diesel Thomas	(Australia) Rossi Johnson	Corish Motorsports
1	R2	Mount Panorama Circuit (Bathurst, New South Wales)		(Australia) Diesel Thomas	(Australia) Diesel Thomas	Corish Motorsports
1	R3	Mount Panorama Circuit (Bathurst, New South Wales)		(Australia) Scott Andriske	(Australia) Scott Andriske	Riskie Racing
1	R4	Mount Panorama Circuit (Bathurst, New South Wales)		(Australia) Anthony DiMauro	(Australia) Anthony DiMauro	Koan Solutions - Crete & Works
2	R1	Symmons Plains Raceway (Launceston, Tasmania)	(Australia) Anthony DiMauro	(Australia) Scott Andriske	(Australia) Ryan Reynolds	Reynovate Construction
2	R2	Symmons Plains Raceway (Launceston, Tasmania)		(Australia) Ryan Reynolds	(Australia) Ryan Reynolds	Reynovate Construction
2	R3	Symmons Plains Raceway (Launceston, Tasmania)		(Australia) Brandon Madden	(Australia) Scott Dornan	Action Line Marking
2	R4	Symmons Plains Raceway (Launceston, Tasmania)		(Australia) Nathan Williams	(Australia) Brandon Madden	Riskie Racing
3	R1	Reid Park Street Circuit (Townsville, Queensland)	(Australia) Reece Chapman	(Australia) Diesel Thomas	(Australia) Brandon Madden	Riskie Racing
3	R2	Reid Park Street Circuit (Townsville, Queensland)		(Australia) Diesel Thomas	(Australia) Diesel Thomas	Corish Motorsports
3	R3	Reid Park Street Circuit (Townsville, Queensland)		(Australia) Anthony DiMauro	(Australia) Brandon Madden	Riskie Racing
3	R4	Reid Park Street Circuit (Townsville, Queensland)		(Australia) Diesel Thomas	(Australia) Brandon Madden	Riskie Racing
4	R1	Queensland Raceway (Ipswich, Queensland)	(Australia) Brandon Madden	(Australia) Diesel Thomas	(Australia) Diesel Thomas	Corish Motorsports
4	R2	Queensland Raceway (Ipswich, Queensland)		(Australia) Scott Andriske	(Australia) Caleb Paterson	Norganics Protein
4	R3	Queensland Raceway (Ipswich, Queensland)		(Australia) Brandon Madden	(Australia) Diesel Thomas	Corish Motorsports
4	R4	Queensland Raceway (Ipswich, Queensland)		(Australia) Diesel Thomas	(Australia) Diesel Thomas	Corish Motorsports
5	R1	The Bend Motorsport Park (Tailem Bend, South Australia)	(Australia) Diesel Thomas	(Australia) Mathew Basso	(Australia) Mathew Basso	Corish Motorsports
5	R2	The Bend Motorsport Park (Tailem Bend, South Australia)		(Australia) Diesel Thomas	(Australia) Brandon Madden	Riskie Racing
5	R3	The Bend Motorsport Park (Tailem Bend, South Australia)		(Australia) Diesel Thomas	(Australia) Diesel Thomas	Corish Motorsports
5	R4	The Bend Motorsport Park (Tailem Bend, South Australia)		(Australia) Jack Boyd	(Australia) Mathew Basso	Corish Motorsports
6	R1	Surfers Paradise Street Circuit (Surfers Paradise, Queensland)	(Australia) Reece Chapman	(Australia) Mathew Basso	(Australia) Scott Andriske	Riskie Racing
6	R2	Surfers Paradise Street Circuit (Surfers Paradise, Queensland)		(Australia) Diesel Thomas	(Australia) Diesel Thomas	Corish Motorsports
6	R3	Surfers Paradise Street Circuit (Surfers Paradise, Queensland)		(Australia) Josh Thomas	(Australia) Hayden Nissen	CNH Racing
6	R4	Surfers Paradise Street Circuit (Surfers Paradise, Queensland)		(Australia) Scott Andriske	(Australia) Diesel Thomas	Corish Motorsports

=== Championship standings ===
Pos.	Driver	(New South Wales) BAT				(Tasmania) TAS				(Queensland) TOW				(Queensland) QUE				(South Australia) BEN				(Queensland) SUR				Points
Pos.	Driver	R1	R2	R3	R4	R1	R2	R3	R4	R1	R2	R3	R4	R1	R2	R3	R4	R1	R2	R3	R4	R1	R2	R3	R4	Points
1	(Australia) Anthony DiMauro	4	4	3	1	Ret	5	18	4	Ret	10	3	6	8	2	2	2	6	6	3	8	Ret	5	16	10	270
2	(Australia) Rossi Johnson	1	5	18	7	13	9	5	5	3	4	Ret	14	12	9	9	Ret	5	2	6	3	9	12	7	5	262
3	(Australia) Diesel Thomas	6	1	Ret	Ret	2	15	Ret	8	2	1	4	2	1	8	1	1	Ret	5	1	Ret	2	1	4	1	256
4	(Australia) Jeff Watters	19	14	13	10	15	17	15	16	15	17	19	18	17	21	20	10	17	12	15	13	25	18	19	19	243
5	(Australia) Brandon Madden					5	2	2	1	1	2	1	1	2	23	6	13	2	1	5	5	6	7	12	3	242
6	(Australia) Cody McKay	12	7	9	13	DNS	14	16	DSQ	7	5	5	5	Ret	14	12	8	11	3	10	Ret	11	10	9	18	239
7	(Australia) Scott Andriske	2	2	1	16	3	3	12	Ret	Ret	7	12	9	4	1	8	4	4	14	4	Ret	1	2	13	Ret	237
8	(Australia) William Rowe	16	10	8	9	Ret	19	Ret	17	9	12	21	8	14	11	22	16	8	10	Ret	DNS	22	24	Ret	14	227
9	(Australia) Mathew Basso					Ret	8	11	3	10	Ret	11	3	6	3	18	Ret	1	8	2	1	4	11	5	2	219
10	(Australia) Nathan Williams	5	11	4	2	6	6	20	Ret	12	11	8	7	13	13	13	Ret					10	3	3	4	210
11	(Australia) Hayden Nissen	13	9	Ret	12	9	12	10	Ret	4	20	15	Ret	7	4	11	6					7	4	1	6	195
12	(Australia) Chad Chapman	Ret	DNS	17	15	14	20	19	15	Ret	16	16	Ret					16	15	17	15					171
13	(Australia) Josh Thomas	10	8	DNS	6									5	5	10	3	7	7	11	6	3	6	2	Ret	131
14	(New Zealand) Ayrton Hodson	8	Ret	7	3	4	4	6	7	Ret	9	2	11	9	6	7	DSQ									165
15	(Australia) Andrew Corish	11	12	6	Ret	7	10	14	11	Ret	WD	WD	WD	Ret	17	Ret	18	14	Ret	12	DNS					164
16	(Australia) Scott O'Keefe	9	6	12	Ret					13	13	14	15	11	7	4	19					14	19	Ret	17	125
17	(Australia) Oscar Pedersen	7	Ret	10	Ret	11	7	9	10	Ret	14	10	13					13	Ret	Ret	9					146
18	(Australia) Jack Boyd	14	3	2	4					5	3	9	Ret					3	4	7	2					132
19	(Australia) Matt Gooding	15	16	15	11	10	13	4	6					15	10	14	Ret									119
20	(Australia) Brendan Tucker													21	Ret	21	15	18	17	16	10	17	Ret	22	15	77
21	(Australia) Craig Thompson					8	16	7	14	11	Ret	13	12									24	22	Ret	16	78
22	(Australia) Scott Dornan					Ret	21	1	12	6	6	6	Ret					9	Ret	9	7					108
23	(Australia) Jaxon Barrington	17	13	11	8	16	18	Ret	13																	106
24	(Australia) Andrew Hamilton									16	18	22	17	Ret	19	17	11									74
25	(Australia) Dennis Butler									Ret	Ret	DNS	16	16	16	Ret	17									65
26	(Australia) Bradi Owen													10	12	5	7									46
27	(Australia) David Makin									14	15	17	10					Ret	13	14	12					83
28	(Australia) Jarrod Keyte	21	WD	WD	WD									19	22	19	12									68
29	(Australia) Reece Chapman									18	Ret	7	4													42
30	(Australia) Grant Thompson									17	19	18	19													36
31	(Australia) Ryan Reynolds					1	1	3	2																	51
32	(Australia) Brad Gartner																	10	9	8	4					46
33	(Australia) Chais Tippett					12	11	8	9																	45
34	(Australia) Kobi Williams																									45
35	(Australia) Nathan Barber																	15	11	13	11					44
36	(Australia) Sam Simpson																									44
37	(Australia) Caleb Paterson													3	DSQ	3	5									43
38	(Australia) John Steffensen																									43
39	(Australia) Kyle Lovering													20	20	16	9									42
40	(Australia) Des Collier																									41
41	(Australia) Keith Bensley	20	17	16	14																					40
42	(Australia) Joseph Andriske																	19	16	19	14					40
43	(Australia) Jed Murphy																									40
44	(Australia) Craig Woods	Ret	15	5	5																					39
45	(Australia) Jacob Paige																	20	18	18	16					38
46	(Australia) Richard Knight					17	Ret	17	18																	35
47	(Australia) Les Corish	18	18	14	DNS																					31
48	(Australia) Dylan Thomas									8	8	20	Ret													31
49	(Australia) Kody Garland	3	WD	WD	WD																					30
50	(Australia) Jacob Currie																	12	DNS	Ret	DNS					30
51	(Australia) Kyle Ensbey																									29
52	(Australia) Ruben Dan					DNS	22	13	DNS																	29
53	(Australia) Kent Quinn													18	15	15	Ret									28
54	(Australia) Brock Paine																					19	13	11	Ret	25
55	(Australia) Emma Clark																									24
56	(Australia) Scott Taylor																					26	Ret	WD	WD	23
Pos.	Driver	R1	R2	R3	R4	R1	R2	R3	R4	R1	R2	R3	R4	R1	R2	R3	R4	R1	R2	R3	R4	R1	R2	R3	R4	Points
Pos.	Driver	(New South Wales) BAT				(Tasmania) TAS				(Queensland) TOW				(Queensland) QUE				(South Australia) BEN				(Queensland) SUR				Points
