= 2026 Mustang Cup Australia =

Car race in Australia

The 2026 Mustang Cup Australia (known for commercial reasons as the 2026 Motorcraft Mustang Cup Australia) was a one-make sports car racing competition for Ford Mustang race cars. It was the inaugural running of the Mustang Cup Australia. The season commenced at Phillip Island Grand Prix Circuit on 27 March and concluded at Sandown Raceway on 1 November.

Josh Anderson was crowned the inaugural Mustang Cup Australia champion while John Goodacre was the best-placed Dark Horse Legends driver in the points standings.

== Calendar ==
The following circuits hosted a round of the 2026 championship.

Rd	Circuit	Dates	Event	Maps
1	(Victoria (state)) Phillip Island Grand Prix Circuit	27–29 March	GT Festival Phillip Island	2026 Mustang Cup Australia is located in Australia
2	(South Australia) The Bend Motorsport Park	8–10 May	GT Festival The Bend	2026 Mustang Cup Australia is located in Australia
3	Queensland Raceway	12–14 June	GT Festival Queensland	2026 Mustang Cup Australia is located in Australia
4	(Northern Territory) Hidden Valley Raceway	24–26 July	GT Festival Darwin	2026 Mustang Cup Australia is located in Australia
5	(New South Wales) Sydney Motorsport Park	18–20 September	GT Festival Sydney	2026 Mustang Cup Australia is located in Australia
6	(Victoria (state)) Sandown Raceway	30 October–1 November	GT Festival Sandown	2026 Mustang Cup Australia is located in Australia

== Teams and drivers ==
Entrant	No	Driver	Class	Rounds
Ben Dunn Motorsport	8	(Australia) Ben Dunn	DHL	1–2, 4–6
Garry Rogers Motorsport	9	(Australia) James Moffat	DH	1
Garry Rogers Motorsport	33	(Australia) Aaron Cameron	DH	1
Garry Rogers Motorsport	34	(Australia) James Golding	DH	1
GWR Australia	11	(Australia) Ben Kavich	DHL	5
GWR Australia	11	(Australia) Ben Grice	DHL	6
GWR Australia	210	(Australia) Zoe Woods	DH	6
Joe Fawcett Motorsport	23	(Australia) Joe Fawcett	DH	All
Radburn Racing Team	29	(Australia) Imogen Radburn	DH	All
HMO Customer Racing	31	(Australia) Brock Stinson	DH	4–5
Link Signs Racing	47	(Australia) Brock Giblin	DH	1–5
MK55 Racing Team	55	(Australia) Matt Kiss	DH	All
Wadley Property Group	80	(Australia) Warren Wadley	DHL	3
RM Race Cars	91	(Papua New Guinea) Keith Kassulke	DHL	1–4
RM Race Cars	92	(Australia) Cameron McLeod	DH	1, 5
RM Race Cars	92	(Australia) Harry Bresnehan	DH	2
RM Race Cars	92	(Australia) Patrick Neville	DH	3
RM Race Cars	92	(Australia) Bryce Fullwood	DH	4
RM Race Cars	92	(Australia) Lee Holdsworth	DH	6
RM Race Cars	93	(Australia) Tyler Everingham	DH	1
RM Race Cars	93	(Australia) John Goodacre	DHL	2–6
RM Race Cars	94	(Australia) Josh Anderson	DH	All
RM Race Cars	95	(Australia) Josh Trappett	DH	All
RM Race Cars	96	(Australia) Patrick Trappett	DH	5–6
RM Race Cars	777	(Australia) Declan Fraser	DH	6
Triple Eight Race Engineering	88	(Australia) Oli Wickham	DH	3–6
Triple Eight Race Engineering	888	(Australia) Jack Perkins	DH	1–5

Icon	Class
DH	Dark Horse
DHL	Dark Horse Legends

== Results and standings ==
=== Season summary ===
Rd	Race	Circuit	Pole position	Fastest lap	Winning driver	Winning team
1	1	(Victoria (state)) Phillip Island Grand Prix Circuit	(Australia) Aaron Cameron	(Australia) Aaron Cameron	(Australia) Aaron Cameron	Garry Rogers Motorsport
1	2	(Victoria (state)) Phillip Island Grand Prix Circuit	(Australia) Aaron Cameron	(Australia) Cameron McLeod	(Australia) Cameron McLeod	RM Race Cars
2	1	(South Australia) The Bend Motorsport Park	(Australia) Jack Perkins	(Australia) Jack Perkins	(Australia) Josh Anderson	RM Race Cars
2	2	(South Australia) The Bend Motorsport Park	(Australia) Joe Fawcett	(Australia) Josh Anderson	(Australia) Josh Anderson	RM Race Cars
3	1	Queensland Raceway	(Australia) Josh Anderson	(Australia) Josh Anderson	(Australia) Josh Anderson	RM Race Cars
3	2	Queensland Raceway	(Australia) Josh Anderson	(Australia) Oli Wickham	(Australia) Oli Wickham	Triple Eight Race Engineering
4	1	(Northern Territory) Hidden Valley Raceway	(Australia) Bryce Fullwood	(Australia) Bryce Fullwood	(Australia) Bryce Fullwood	RM Race Cars
4	2	(Northern Territory) Hidden Valley Raceway	(Australia) Joe Fawcett	(Australia) Bryce Fullwood	(Australia) Bryce Fullwood	RM Race Cars
5	1	(New South Wales) Sydney Motorsport Park	(Australia) Oli Wickham	(Australia) Oli Wickham	(Australia) Oli Wickham	Triple Eight Race Engineering
5	2	(New South Wales) Sydney Motorsport Park	(Australia) Oli Wickham	(Australia) Oli Wickham	(Australia) Josh Anderson	RM Race Cars
6	1	(Victoria (state)) Sandown Raceway	(Australia) Oli Wickham	(Australia) Declan Fraser	(Australia) Josh Trappett	RM Race Cars
6	2	(Victoria (state)) Sandown Raceway	(Australia) Oli Wickham	(Australia) Oli Wickham	(Australia) Oli Wickham	Triple Eight Race Engineering

=== Championship standings ===
Pos.	Driver	(Victoria (state)) PHI		(South Australia) BEN		(Queensland) QUE		(Northern Territory) DAR		(New South Wales) SYD		(Victoria (state)) SAN		Pts
Pos.	Driver	R1	R2	R1	R2	R1	R2	R1	R2	R1	R2	R1	R2	Pts
1	(Australia) Josh Anderson	6	5	1	1	1	10	3	2	5	1	7	3	545
2	(Australia) Joe Fawcett	5	6	5	3	4	4	2	4	3	4	9	5	483
3	(Australia) Oli Wickham					2	1	6	5	1	2	2	1	414
4	(Australia) Josh Trappett	10	11	3	5	5	3	7	7	6	8	1	10	402
5	(Australia) Matt Kiss	7	7	8	7	9	5	8	9	Ret	5	DSQ	6	289
6	(Australia) Jack Perkins	Ret	DNS	2	2	3	2	5	6	Ret	Ret			279
7	(Australia) Imogen Radburn	11	Ret	6	6	8	6	10	8	8	9	13	8	275
8	(Australia) Brock Stinson							4	3	4	DNS	3	2	234
9	(Australia) Brock Giblin	9	8	7	Ret	7	7			9	7			188
10	(Australia) John Goodacre			9	8	6	8	9	11			10	12	184
11	(Australia) Ben Dunn	13	12	DSQ	9			11	10	10	10	12	11	165
12	(Australia) Cameron McLeod	4	1							2	DNS			156
13	(Papua New Guinea) Keith Kassulke	12	9	10	10	10	9	12	12					154
14	(Australia) Patrick Trappett									7	3	4	10	148
15	(Australia) Bryce Fullwood							1	1					121
16	(Australia) Aaron Cameron	1	2											115
17	(Australia) James Moffat	3	4											90
18	(Australia) Harry Bresnehan			4	4									84
19	(Australia) James Golding	2	10											74
20	(Australia) Tyler Everingham	8	3											74
21	(Australia) Ben Grice											8	4	68
22	(Australia) Zoe Woods											11	9	41
23	(Australia) Lee Holdsworth											5	Ret	36
24	(Australia) Ben Kavich									11	11			36
25	(Australia) Jack Wallis									PO	6			32
26	(Australia) Declan Fraser											6	Ret	32
27	(Australia) Patrick Neville					11	Ret							18
Pos.	Driver	R1	R2	R1	R2	R1	R2	R1	R2	R1	R2	R1	R2	Pts
Pos.	Driver	(Victoria (state)) PHI		(South Australia) BEN		(Queensland) QUE		(Northern Territory) DAR		(New South Wales) SYD		(Victoria (state)) SAN		Pts

== See also ==
IMSA Ford Mustang Challenge
