= Queensland Raceway =

Motorsport track in Queensland, Australia

- National Circuit (1999–present)
- Location: Willowbank, Ipswich, Queensland
- Coordinates: 27°41′25″S 152°39′9″E
- FIA Grade: 3
- Owner: Tony Quinn (October 2021–present); John Tetley (2004–September 2021); Motorsport Queensland (1999–2003)
- Opened: 1999
- Major events: Current: Supercars Championship; Ipswich Super 440 (1999–2000, 2003–2019, 2025–2026); Queensland 500 (1999–2002); GTWC Australia (2005–2007, 2013, 2016–2017, 2022–present); ASBK (2000–2014, 2022–present)

National Circuit (1999–present)
- Length: 3.126 km (1.942 mi)
- Turns: 6
- Race lap record: 1:04.0661 ( (New Zealand) Simon Wills, Reynard 94D, 1999, Formula Holden)

Sportsman Circuit (1999–present)
- Length: 2.150 km (1.336 mi)
- Turns: 7

Clubman Circuit (1999–present)
- Length: 2.110 km (1.311 mi)
- Turns: 7

Sprint Circuit (1999–present)
- Length: 1.890 km (1.174 mi)
- Turns: 7

Queensland Raceway, nicknamed "the paperclip", is a motor racing circuit located at Willowbank in Ipswich, Queensland, Australia. The circuit hosted Supercars Championship until 2019, drifting as well as club level racing and ride days.

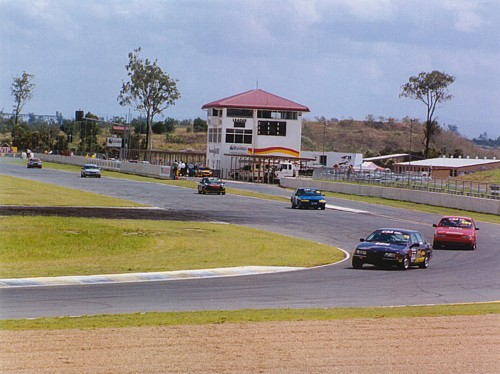
Turn 1 and Dick Johnson Straight

Queensland Raceway is 3.126 km (1.942 mi) long and 12 m (13 yd) wide, running clockwise. There are six corners. The circuit was designed by Tony Slattery with input from car and motorcycle racing authorities including CAMS circuit expert Professor Rod Troutbeck.

Queensland Raceway is a FIA Grade 3 circuit. However, the track uses a mixture of sanctioning bodies including Motorsport Australia, AASA and Motorcycling Australia for its events including race meetings, drifting, motorbike ride days and roll racing.

Spectator viewing at the facility is excellent with the flat layout of the circuit and spectator mounds. However the flat layout makes racing less exciting for the competitors than undulating circuits like Phillip Island. The track became infamous for its bumps, although it was resurfaced in late 2011.

Queensland Raceway is located with the bounds of the Ipswich Motorsport Precinct, which is also home to the Willowbank Raceway dragstrip, a kart track, a short dirt circuit and a junior (under-16) motorcycle speedway. The track is also located near RAAF Base Amberley and shares the base's 6 km (3.7 mi) noise exclusion zone.

== Layout configurations ==
There are four Short Circuit variations of the track in addition to the full circuit:

- Sportsman: 2.150 km (1.336 mi)
- Clubman: 2.110 km (1.311 mi)
- Sprint: 1.890 km (1.174 mi)
- Switchback: 2.500 km (1.553 mi)
Queensland Raceway layout configurations
National Circuit (1999–present)

Sportsman Circuit (1999–present)

Clubman Circuit (1999–present)

Sprint Circuit (1999–present)

The National circuit gets the most use for testing purposes and for major motorsport events. The Clubman circuit is also utilised regularly at state and club level racing. The Sprint circuit also in semi-regular use. The Sportsman circuit, originally optimised for truck racing, is now rarely used. In 2024 a new track was created, the Switchback, which incorporates a new section connecting the interior straights half way along their lengths. A variation of the Clubman circuit it turns left onto the Switchback section and completes the lap using the Crossover and turn 6 to return to the Dick Johnson Straight.

== Dick Johnson Straight ==
Dick Johnson was honoured on 16 August 2001, when the front straight of the Queensland Raceway was officially named "Dick Johnson Straight".

Johnson, a five-time national champion and three-time Bathurst winner, proudly unveiled a piece of pit-lane wall, which now bears his name and a plaque commemorating the ceremony and Johnson's motor racing achievements. The unveiling was part of the pre-race build-up to the 2001 VIP Petfoods Queensland 500. Johnson was joined by his son Steve during the ceremony as well as a host of V8 Supercar drivers and teams during what was a serious day of testing at the circuit.

Johnson was one of the driving forces behind the development of the Queensland Raceway and made his last competitive drive in a V8 Supercar in 2000's Queensland 500 with son Steve.

== Events ==
Current

- May: Hi-Tec Oils Super Series Two Days of Thunder, TA2 Racing Muscle Car Series, Australian Formula Ford Championship, Australian Production Car Series
- June: GT World Challenge Australia GT Festival Queensland, GT4 Australia Series, Porsche Sprint Challenge Australia, Radical Cup Australia, Australian Superbike Championship, Ferrari Challenge Australasia, Mustang Cup Australia
- July: Classic Queensland
- August: Supercars Championship Ipswich Super 440, Hi-Tec Oils Super Series Fight in the Night, Australian National Trans-Am Series, Porsche Carrera Cup Australia Championship, TA2 Racing Muscle Car Series, Australian Formula Ford Championship, Australian Production Car Series, GR Cup
- September: AU4 Australian Championship, Excel 300

Former

- Aussie Racing Cars (2002–2005, 2010–2011, 2013–2014, 2016, 2018–2019, 2023–2024)
- Australian Mini Challenge (2010)
- Australian Super Touring Championship (1999, 2002)
- Supercars Championship
  - Queensland 500 (1999–2002)
- SuperUtes Series (2018–2019)
- TCR Australia Touring Car Series (2019, 2022–2024)
- Touring Car Masters (2009, 2012–2013, 2015–2017, 2019)
- V8 Ute Racing Series (2001–2003, 2006–2008, 2017)

== Lap records ==
As of August 2026, the fastest official race lap records at Queensland Raceway are listed as:

| Category | Time | Driver | Vehicle | Date |
National Circuit (1999–present): 3.126 km (1.942 mi)
| Formula Holden | 1:04.0661 | (New Zealand) Simon Wills | Reynard 94D | 11 July 1999 |
| Formula 3 | 1:04.4146 | (Australia) Tim Macrow | Dallara F307 | 4 August 2013 |
| Sports Sedans | 1:06.8323 | (Australia) Jordan Caruso | Audi A4 | 6 August 2023 |
| Superbikes | 1:07.093 | (Australia) Harrison Voight | Ducati Panigale V4 R | 28 June 2026 |
| Group CN | 1:07.9908 | (Australia) John-Paul Drake | Wolf F1 Mistral | 6 August 2022 |
| GT3 | 1:07.3959 | (Australia) Paul Lucchitti | Mercedes-AMG GT3 Evo | 4 August 2024 |
| Supercars | 1:09.2277 | (Australia) Broc Feeney | Ford Mustang S650 | 9 August 2026 |
| Ferrari Challenge | 1:09.3660 | (Australia) Damian Hamilton | Ferrari 296 Challenge | 21 June 2026 |
| Radical Cup Australia | 1:09.6090 | (Australia) Cooper Cutts | Radical SR3 RSX | 31 May 2025 |
| Porsche Carrera Cup | 1:09.6785 | (Australia) Harri Jones | Porsche 911 (992 I) GT3 Cup | 10 August 2025 |
| Super2 Series | 1:10.1494 | (Australia) Rylan Gray | Ford Mustang S550 | 9 August 2025 |
| Formula 4 | 1:10.2238 | (Australia) Isaac McNeill | Mygale M14-F4 | 4 August 2024 |
| Supersport | 1:10.368 | (Australia) Tom Toparis | Yamaha YZF-R6 | 28 June 2026 |
| N-GT | 1:11.0638 | (Australia) John Bowe | Ferrari 360 N-GT | 15 June 2003 |
| Trans-Am Australia | 1:12.0091 | (Australia) Todd Hazelwood | Ford Mustang Trans-Am | 21 August 2026 |
| GT4 | 1:13.1370 | (Australia) Tom McLennan | McLaren Artura GT4 | 4 August 2024 |
| Super Touring | 1:13.8379 | (New Zealand) Jim Richards | Volvo S40 | 1 August 1999 |
| Formula Ford | 1:13.8758 | (Australia) Nick Rowe | Mygale SJ13 | 10 August 2014 |
| TCR Touring Car | 1:13.9090 | (Australia) Jay Hanson | Audi RS 3 LMS TCR (2021) | 7 August 2022 |
| Mustang Cup | 1:15.0100 | (Australia) Josh Anderson | Ford Mustang Dark Horse R | 13 June 2026 |
| Formula Ford 1600 | 1:15.8823 | (Australia) Stewart McColl | Van Diemen RF98 | 2 July 2000 |
| Touring Car Masters | 1:16.3951 | (Australia) John Bowe | Holden Torana SL/R 5000 | 30 July 2017 |
| Production Touring Cars | 1:16.8903 | (Australia) Aaren Russell | BMW M3 (F80) | 6 August 2022 |
| 125cc GP | 1:16.983 | (Australia) Josh Brookes | Honda RS125R | 4 June 2000 |
| Moto3 | 1:18.084 | (Australia) Corey Turner | Honda NSF250R | 16 September 2012 |
| Aussie Racing Cars | 1:19.9237 | (Australia) Brandon Madden | Ford Mustang | 23 August 2026 |
| Supersport 300 | 1:20.740 | (Australia) Orlando Peovitis | Yamaha YZF-R3 | 28 June 2026 |
| Toyota 86 Racing Series | 1:23.1138 | (Australia) Lincoln Taylor | Toyota 86 | 9 August 2025 |
| V8 Ute Racing Series | 1:23.3265 | (Australia) Mason Barbera | Ford FG Falcon Ute | 29 July 2017 |
| SuperUtes | 1:30.4346 | (Australia) Ryal Harris | Mazda BT-50 | 22 July 2018 |
| Oceania Junior Cup | 1:34.428 | (Australia) Ethan Johnson | Yamaha YZF-R15 | 28 April 2024 |

== Future development ==
A huge accident on 1 May 2010 in a Mini Challenge support race to the 2010 V8 Supercar Championship Series sparked discussion about the safety of the circuit. However, circuit owner at the time, John Tetley insisted that the track was still safe. TeamVodafone driver Craig Lowndes suggested that Queensland Raceway was long overdue for upgrades including a resurfacing. Tetley stated that resurfacing would be done in late 2010, although major flooding in the south-east Queensland region early in 2011, and the subsequent lack of availability of necessary equipment as devastated roads are repaired has seen that resurfacing delayed for twelve months. In October 2011 the resurfacing was commenced and completed before Christmas.

During July 2016, the Ipswich council announced plans to invest $220 million upgrading Queensland Raceway. The first phase of the project is to extend the length of current circuit. The proposed plans by the council were never followed through with after massive upheaval and controversy. The company responsible (Ipswich Motorsport Park PTY LTD) for the redevelopment was wound up in 2017 and de-registered.

In October 2021 former owner John Tetley and Tony Quinn signed a pact under which the Quinn took the lease, management and operations of Queensland Raceway. Since this time the circuit has seen a big investment to lift its standards and facilities to where they should have been.

== Willowbank 300 ==
The Willowbank 300 is held annually at Queensland Raceway as part of the Queensland Endurance Championship.

The Endurance Championship consists of the Ipswich event and the Lakeside Park 300 which is traditionally held in the latter part of the year at the historic circuit north of Brisbane. The Willowbank 300 has been a landmark event on the Queensland Raceway calendar since 2014.

== Fatalities at the circuit ==
There have been five fatalities at the venue since it opened in 1999. Porsche Supercup driver Sean Edwards in 2013 during testing, as well as club-racer Dennis Smith at a sprint event in 2016. Two further deaths occurred when a 32-year-old driver and 41-year-old passenger were killed in August 2017. In 2023, Shane Savage died at the Queensland Raceway after his car rolled.

== See also ==
- Motorsport in Australia
