= 2026 Porsche Carrera Cup Australia =

Motorsport season

The 2026 Porsche Carrera Cup Australia (commercially titled 2026 Equity-One Carrera Cup Australia) is a national motor racing series conducted using Porsche 911 (992) GT3 Cup cars.

== Calendar ==
Event	Circuit	Dates	Supporting
1	(Victoria (state)) Albert Park Circuit	5–8 March	Formula One World Championship; Supercars Championship
2	(Northern Territory) Hidden Valley Raceway	19–21 June	Supercars Championship
3	Queensland Raceway	21–23 August	Supercars Championship
4	(South Australia) The Bend Motorsport Park	11–13 September	Supercars Championship
5	(New South Wales) Mount Panorama Circuit	8–11 October	Supercars Championship
6	(Queensland) Surfers Paradise Street Circuit	23–25 October	Supercars Championship
7	(South Australia) Adelaide Street Circuit	26–29 November	Supercars Championship

== Entry list ==
Team	No.	Driver	Class	Rounds
(Australia) GWR / RAM Motorsport	1	(Australia) Dylan O'Keeffe	P	1–6
(Australia) GWR / RAM Motorsport	14	(Australia) Matthew Belford	PA	1–6
(Australia) GWR / RAM Motorsport	22	(Australia) Dean Cook	PA	1–2
(Australia) EMA Motorsport	2	(Australia) David Russell	P	1–6
(Australia) EMA Motorsport	53	(Australia) Max Geoghegan	P	1–2, 4–6
(Australia) TekworkX Motorsport	3	(Australia) Josh Thomas	P	1–6
(Australia) TekworkX Motorsport	15	(New Zealand) Clay Osborne	P	1–6
(Australia) TekworkX Motorsport	18	(Australia) Diesel Thomas	P	1–6
(Australia) TekworkX Motorsport	37	(Australia) Andrew Georgiadis	PA	1, 3–4
(Australia) TekworkX Motorsport	78	(Australia) Aaron Love	P	1–6
(Australia) TekworkX Motorsport	99	(France) Marcus Amand	P	1
(Australia) Melbourne Performance Centre	4	(Australia) Stephen Grove	PA	1–6
(Australia) Melbourne Performance Centre	8	(Australia) Dean Fiore	P	1
(Australia) Melbourne Performance Centre	9	(Australia) Marc Cini	PA	1–6
(Australia) DNA Autosport	5	(Australia) Jacque Jarjo	PA	1–6
(Australia) DNA Autosport	79	(Australia) Ryan Casha	P	1–3
(New Zealand) McElrea Racing	12	(Australia) Harri Jones	P	1–6
(New Zealand) McElrea Racing	23	(Australia) Lachlan Bloxson	P	1–6
(New Zealand) McElrea Racing	24	(Australia) Daniel Quimby	P	2–3, 5–6
(New Zealand) McElrea Racing	51	(Australia) Tim Farrell	PA	3, 6
(New Zealand) McElrea Racing	95	(Australia) Brett Boulton	PA	1
(Australia) MAC & CO Racing	16	(Australia) Richard Macdonald	PA	1–2, 5–6
(Australia) Vast Motorsport	29	(Australia) Amar Sharma	P	1–6
(Australia) Sonic Motor Racing Services	77	(Australia) Rodney Jane	PA	1–6
(Australia) Sonic Motor Racing Services	777	(Australia) Marcos Flack	P	1–6
(Australia) Sonic Motor Racing Services	999	(Australia) Angelo Mouzouris	P	1–6
(Australia) Scott Taylor Motorsport	85	(Australia) Matt Slavin	PA	1–6
(Australia) Scott Taylor Motorsport	222	(Australia) Scott Taylor	PA	1–6
(New Zealand) EBM	66	(New Zealand) Marco Giltrap	P	2, 4
(New Zealand) EBM	81	(Australia) Tom McLennan	P	3, 5
(New Zealand) EBM	89	(New Zealand) Tom Bewley	P	1–6
(New Zealand) EBM	100	(Australia) Dale Wood	P	1
(New Zealand) EBM	911	(Australia) Glen Wood	P	1–6
(Australia) Wall Racing	91	(Australia) Jake Santalucia	P	1–6
(Australia) Wall Racing	111	(Australia) Liam Talbot	PA	2–3

Icon	Class
P	Pro Cup
PA	Pro-Am Cup
	Guest Starter

== Results ==
Round		Circuit	Pole position	Fastest lap	Overall winner	Winning team	Pro-Am Winner
1	R1	(Victoria (state)) Albert Park Circuit	(New Zealand) Clay Osborne	(France) Marcus Amand	(New Zealand) Clay Osborne	(Australia) TekworkX Motorsport	(Australia) Matthew Belford
1	R2	(Victoria (state)) Albert Park Circuit		(Australia) Harri Jones	(France) Marcus Amand	(Australia) TekworkX Motorsport	(Australia) Matthew Belford
1	R3	(Victoria (state)) Albert Park Circuit		(Australia) Harri Jones	(Australia) Harri Jones	(New Zealand) McElrea Racing	(Australia) Matthew Belford
2	R1	(Northern Territory) Hidden Valley Raceway	(New Zealand) Clay Osborne	(New Zealand) Clay Osborne	(New Zealand) Clay Osborne	(Australia) TekworkX Motorsport	(Australia) Jacque Jarjo
2	R2	(Northern Territory) Hidden Valley Raceway		(New Zealand) Clay Osborne	(Australia) Harri Jones	(New Zealand) McElrea Racing	(Australia) Jacque Jarjo
3	R1	Queensland Raceway	(New Zealand) Tom Bewley	(Australia) Harri Jones	(Australia) Harri Jones	(New Zealand) McElrea Racing	(Australia) Liam Talbot
3	R2	Queensland Raceway		(Australia) Harri Jones	(Australia) Harri Jones	(New Zealand) McElrea Racing	(Australia) Andrew Georgiadis
4	R1	(South Australia) The Bend Motorsport Park	(New Zealand) Tom Bewley	(Australia) Harri Jones	(Australia) Harri Jones	(New Zealand) McElrea Racing	(Australia) Rodney Jane
4	R2	(South Australia) The Bend Motorsport Park	Race abandoned due to inclement weather				
5	R1	(New South Wales) Mount Panorama Circuit	(Australia) Jake Santalucia	(Australia) Aaron Love	(Australia) Harri Jones	(New Zealand) McElrea Racing	(Australia) Jacque Jarjo
5	R2	(New South Wales) Mount Panorama Circuit		(Australia) Lachlan Bloxsom	(Australia) Lachlan Bloxsom	(New Zealand) McElrea Racing	(Australia) Matt Slavin
5	R3	(New South Wales) Mount Panorama Circuit		(Australia) Dylan O'Keeffe	(Australia) Harri Jones	(New Zealand) McElrea Racing	(Australia) Matt Slavin
6	R1	(Queensland) Surfers Paradise Street Circuit	(New Zealand) Tom Bewley	(Australia) Jacque Jarjo	(Australia) Harri Jones	(New Zealand) McElrea Racing	(Australia) Rodney Jane
6	R2	(Queensland) Surfers Paradise Street Circuit		(New Zealand) Tom Bewley	(New Zealand) Tom Bewley	(New Zealand) EBM	(Australia) Matthew Belford
6	R3	(Queensland) Surfers Paradise Street Circuit		(Australia) Harri Jones	(Australia) Harri Jones	(New Zealand) McElrea Racing	(Australia) Rodney Jane
7	R1	(South Australia) Adelaide Street Circuit					
7	R2	(South Australia) Adelaide Street Circuit					
7	R3	(South Australia) Adelaide Street Circuit					

== Championship standings ==
=== Pro ===
Pos.	Driver	MEL (Victoria (state))			HID (Northern Territory)		QLD (Queensland)		BEN (South Australia)		BAT (New South Wales)			SUR (Queensland)			ADE (South Australia)			Points
Pos.	Driver	R1	R2	R3	R1	R2	R1	R2	R1	R2	R1	R2	R3	R1	R2	R3	R1	R2	R3	Points
1	(Australia) Harri Jones	3	3	1	3	1	1	1	1	C	1	3	1	1	2	1				869
2	(New Zealand) Clay Osborne	**1**	5	4	**1**	2	5	2	24	C	12	13	8	3	4	4				587
3	(Australia) David Russell	5	13	13	8	9	3	3	2	C	3	2	2	6	6	6				574
4	(Australia) Aaron Love	6	7	5	2	12	2	14	3	C	4	21	22	4	3	3				522
5	(Australia) Glen Wood	4	4	6	5	10	7	24	6	C	24	5	10	5	5	5				451
6	(Australia) Dylan O'Keeffe	2	2	3	10	4	Ret	4	18	C	6	4	3	18	9	18				441
7	(Australia) Lachlan Bloxsom	9	16	10	7	8	4	Ret	5	C	7	1	5	10	13	7				440
8	(Australia) Angelo Mouzouris	11	6	7	9	11	8	7	10	C	9	7	6	23	8	9				408
9	(Australia) Max Geoghegan	10	9	8	16	22	6	11	11	C	5	6	7	7	11	8				401
10	(New Zealand) Tom Bewley	16	10	Ret	6	5	**Ret**	21	**4**	C	23	Ret	DNS	**2**	1	2				353
11	(Australia) Jake Santalucia	12	8	9	14	7	14	5	17	C	**WD**	WD	WD	9	10	19				308
12	(Australia) Diesel Thomas	14	12	11	15	13	Ret	DNS	7	C	11	10	9	8	22	DSQ				267
13	(Australia) Amar Sharma	DSQ	15	16	24	26	17	17	13	C	16	16	16	14	18	15				263
14	(Australia) Marcos Flack				11	Ret	15	8	9	C	2	9	4							259
15	(Australia) Daniel Quimby				13	6	24	10			8	8	17	20	7	Ret				258
16	(Australia) Josh Thomas	15	Ret	15	17	14	9	6	12	C	14	Ret	14							252
17	(New Zealand) Marco Giltrap				4	3			8	C										159
18	(Australia) Ryan Casha	13	14	Ret	12	15	18	9												155
19	(France) Marcus Amand	7	1	2																140
20	(Australia) Tom McLennan						Ret	DNS												46
21	(Australia) Dean Fiore	Ret	11	14																39
22	(Australia) Dale Wood	8	Ret	12																23
Pos.	Driver	R1	R2	R3	R1	R2	R1	R2	R1	R2	R1	R2	R3	R1	R2	R3	R1	R2	R3	Points
Pos.	Driver	MEL (Victoria (state))			HID (Northern Territory)		QLD (Queensland)		BEN (South Australia)		BAT (New South Wales)			SUR (Queensland)			ADE (South Australia)			Points

Colour	Result
Gold	Winner
Silver	Second place
Bronze	Third place
Green	Points classification
Blue	Non-points classification
Blue	Non-classified finish (NC)
Purple	Retired, not classified (Ret)
Red	Did not qualify (DNQ)
Red	Did not pre-qualify (DNPQ)
Black	Disqualified (DSQ)
White	Did not start (DNS)
White	Withdrew (WD)
White	Race cancelled (C)
Blank	Did not practice (DNP)
Blank	Did not arrive (DNA)
Blank	Excluded (EX)

**Bold** – Pole
Italics – Fastest Lap

Notes

† – Driver did not finish the race, but were classified as they completed over 75% of the race distance.

=== Pro-Am ===
Pos.	Driver	MEL (Victoria (state))			HID (Northern Territory)		QLD (Queensland)		BEN (South Australia)		BAT (New South Wales)			SUR (Queensland)			ADE (South Australia)			Points
Pos.	Driver	R1	R2	R3	R1	R2	R1	R2	R1	R2	R1	R2	R3	R1	R2	R3	R1	R2	R3	Points
1	(Australia) Matthew Belford	1	1	1	3	4	2	6	4	C	3	2	2							616
2	(Australia) Matt Slavin	3	3	4	5	5	5	5	2	C	2	1	1							569
3	(Australia) Jacque Jarjo	4	4	3	1	1	4	2	Ret	C	1	3	3							567
4	(Australia) Rodney Jane	Ret	2	6	6	3	6	3	1	C	4	4	4							502
5	(Australia) Scott Taylor	9	10	10	8	7	9	9	6	C	6	6	6							383
6	(Australia) Stephen Grove	7	8	8	Ret	Ret	8	8	5	C	5	5	5							323
7	(Australia) Andrew Georgiadis	6	7	7			3	1	3	C										308
8	(Australia) Liam Talbot				2	2	1	4												294
9	(Australia) Marc Cini	Ret	9	9	7	8	10	DNS	Ret	C	7	7	7							265
10	(Australia) Dean Cook	2	5	2	4	6														236
11	(Australia) Richard MacDonald	8	11	Ret	DNS	9					8	8	8							145
12	(Australia) Brett Boulton	5	6	5																100
13	(Australia) Tim Farrell						7	7												90
Pos.	Driver	R1	R2	R3	R1	R2	R1	R2	R1	R2	R1	R2	R3	R1	R2	R3	R1	R2	R3	Points
Pos.	Driver	MEL (Victoria (state))			HID (Northern Territory)		QLD (Queensland)		BEN (South Australia)		BAT (New South Wales)			SUR (Queensland)			ADE (South Australia)			Points

=== Michelin Junior ===
Pos.	Driver	MEL (Victoria (state))			HID (Northern Territory)		QLD (Queensland)		BEN (South Australia)		BAT (New South Wales)			SUR (Queensland)			ADE (South Australia)			Points
Pos.	Driver	R1	R2	R3	R1	R2	R1	R2	R1	R2	R1	R2	R3	R1	R2	R3	R1	R2	R3	Points
1	(New Zealand) Clay Osborne	1	5	4	1	2	5	2	Ret	C	12	11	8							491
2	(Australia) Lochie Bloxsom	9	16	10	7	8	4	Ret	5	C	7	1	5							381
3	(Australia) Marcos Flack	DNS	DNS	DNS	11	Ret	11	8	9	C	2	9	4							259
4	(Australia) Jake Santalucia	12	8	9	14	7	10	5	14	C	DNS	DNS	DNS							258
5	(Australia) Diesel Thomas	14	12	11	15	13	Ret	DNS	7	C	11	10	9							227
6	(New Zealand) Tom Bewley	16	10	Ret	6	5	Ret	14	4	C	Ret	Ret	DNS							218
7	(Australia) Daniel Quimby				13	6	14	10			8	8	14							210
Pos.	Driver	R1	R2	R3	R1	R2	R1	R2	R1	R2	R1	R2	R3	R1	R2	R3	R1	R2	R3	Points
Pos.	Driver	MEL (Victoria (state))			HID (Northern Territory)		QLD (Queensland)		BEN (South Australia)		BAT (New South Wales)			SUR (Queensland)			ADE (South Australia)			Points

=== Teams ===
Pos.	Team	Points
1	GWR / RAM Motorsport	1159
2	McElrea Racing	1145
3	Sonic Motor Racing Services	913
4	DNA Autosport	813
5	Wall Racing	766
6	TekworkX Motorsport	744
7	ASM	686
8	EMA Motorsport	574
9	EBM	475
10	Scott Taylor Motorsport	417
11	Melbourne Performance Centre	381
12	TFH Racing / TekworkX	234
13	Vast Motorsport	213

== See also ==
- 2026 Porsche Supercup
- 2026 Porsche Carrera Cup France
- 2026 Porsche Carrera Cup Germany
- 2026 Porsche Carrera Cup North America
- 2026 Porsche Carrera Cup Asia
- 2026 Porsche Carrera Cup Japan
