= 2026 GT4 Australia Series =

Motor racing competition

The 2026 GT4 Australia Series (commercially titled 2026 Monochrome GT4 Australia Series) was an Australian motorsport competition for GT4 cars. The championship was the third season of a standalone GT4 Australia series, having split from the Australian Production Car Series at the end of 2023, and was the third season of the championship being solely managed by the SRO Motorsports Group. The championship started at the Phillip Island Grand Prix Circuit on March 27 and concluded at Sandown Raceway on November 1.

== Calendar ==
Round	Circuit	City / State	Date	Map
1	(Victoria (state)) Phillip Island Grand Prix Circuit	Phillip Island, Victoria	27–29 March	2026 GT4 Australia Series is located in Australia
2	(South Australia) The Bend Motorsport Park	Tailem Bend, South Australia	8–10 May	2026 GT4 Australia Series is located in Australia
3	Queensland Raceway	Ipswich, Queensland	12–14 June	2026 GT4 Australia Series is located in Australia
4	(Northern Territory) Hidden Valley Raceway	Darwin, Northern Territory	24–26 July	2026 GT4 Australia Series is located in Australia
5	(New South Wales) Sydney Motorsport Park	Eastern Creek, New South Wales	18–20 September	2026 GT4 Australia Series is located in Australia
6	(Victoria (state)) Sandown Raceway	Melbourne, Victoria	30 October–1 November	2026 GT4 Australia Series is located in Australia

== Teams and drivers ==
Team	Car	Engine	No.	Drivers	Class	Rounds
(Australia) Gomersall Motorsport	Ford Mustang GT4 (S650)	Ford Coyote 5.0 L V8	1	(Australia) Aaron Seton	SA	1–2, 4–5
(Australia) Gomersall Motorsport	Ford Mustang GT4 (S650)	Ford Coyote 5.0 L V8	1	(Australia) Jason Gomersall	SA	1–2, 4
(Australia) Gomersall Motorsport	Ford Mustang GT4 (S650)	Ford Coyote 5.0 L V8	1	(Australia) Anthony Di Mauro	SA	5
(Australia) Gomersall Motorsport	Ford Mustang GT4 (S650)	Ford Coyote 5.0 L V8	14	(Australia) Glenn Walker	Am	1–5
(Australia) Gomersall Motorsport	Ford Mustang GT4 (S650)	Ford Coyote 5.0 L V8	36	(Australia) Jake Camilleri	S	1–5
(Australia) Thunder Buddies Racing	BMW M4 GT4 (G82)	BMW S58B30T0 3.0 L Turbo I6	3	(Australia) Ryder Quinn	SA	1–5
(Australia) Thunder Buddies Racing	BMW M4 GT4 (G82)	BMW S58B30T0 3.0 L Turbo I6	3	(New Zealand) Daniel Jilesen	SA	1
(Australia) Thunder Buddies Racing	BMW M4 GT4 (G82)	BMW S58B30T0 3.0 L Turbo I6	3	(Australia) Steve Jakic	SA	2–5
(New Zealand) McElrea Racing	BMW M4 GT4 Evo (G82)	BMW S58B30T0 3.0 L Turbo I6	5	(Australia) Nathan Murray	Am	1–5
(New Zealand) McElrea Racing	BMW M4 GT4 Evo (G82)	BMW S58B30T0 3.0 L Turbo I6	7	(Australia) Jay Murray	S	1–5
(Australia) Method Motorsport	Porsche 718 Cayman GT4 RS Clubsport	Porsche MDG.GA 4.0 L Flat-6	6	(Australia) Cy Pearson	Am	1–5
(Australia) Method Motorsport	Porsche 718 Cayman GT4 RS Clubsport	Porsche MDG.GA 4.0 L Flat-6	64	(Australia) Nathan Callaghan	Am	1–5
(Australia) Method Motorsport	Porsche 718 Cayman GT4 RS Clubsport	Porsche MDG.GA 4.0 L Flat-6	64	(Australia) Chris Lillis	Am	1–5
(Australia) Method Motorsport	McLaren Artura GT4	McLaren M630 3.0 L Turbo V6	11	(Australia) Ryan Sorensen	Am	1–5
(Australia) Method Motorsport	McLaren Artura GT4	McLaren M630 3.0 L Turbo V6	25	(Australia) Tom Hayman	S	1–5
(Australia) Method Motorsport	McLaren Artura GT4	McLaren M630 3.0 L Turbo V6	25	(Australia) Jett Murray	S	1–5
(Australia) Method Motorsport	McLaren Artura GT4	McLaren M630 3.0 L Turbo V6	87	(Australia) Jarrod Hughes	S	1–3
(Australia) Method Motorsport	McLaren Artura GT4	McLaren M630 3.0 L Turbo V6	87	(Australia) Summer Rintoule	S	1–3
(Australia) Method Motorsport	Ford Mustang GT4 (S650)	Ford Coyote 5.0 L V8	118	(Australia) Dean Campbell	SA	1–2, 4–5
(Australia) Method Motorsport	Ford Mustang GT4 (S650)	Ford Coyote 5.0 L V8	118	(Australia) Cameron Crick	SA	1
(Australia) Method Motorsport	Ford Mustang GT4 (S650)	Ford Coyote 5.0 L V8	118	(Australia) Tom McLennan	SA	2
(Australia) Method Motorsport	Ford Mustang GT4 (S650)	Ford Coyote 5.0 L V8	118	(Australia) Cody Burcher	SA	4–5
GWR Australia	Toyota GR Supra GT4 Evo2	BMW B58B30 3.0 L Turbo I6	9	(Australia) Daniel Frougas	S	1–5
GWR Australia	Toyota GR Supra GT4 Evo2	BMW B58B30 3.0 L Turbo I6	9	(New Zealand) Chris White	S	2–4
GWR Australia	Toyota GR Supra GT4 Evo2	BMW B58B30 3.0 L Turbo I6	9	(New Zealand) Zach Blincoe	S	5
(Australia) Pitstop Racing	Ginetta G55 GT4	Ford Cyclone 3.7 L V6	10	(Australia) Keelan Dunston	S	1
(Australia) Love Racing by Team Soutar Motorsport	Mercedes-AMG GT4	Mercedes-AMG M178 4.0 L Turbo V8	17	(Australia) Bailey Love	Am	1–4
(Australia) Love Racing by Team Soutar Motorsport	Mercedes-AMG GT4	Mercedes-AMG M178 4.0 L Turbo V8	17	(Australia) Rob Love	Am	1–3
(Australia) Murphy Racing by Team Soutar Motorsport	Mercedes-AMG GT4	Mercedes-AMG M178 4.0 L Turbo V8	58	(Australia) Gerry Murphy	SA	1–3
(Australia) Murphy Racing by Team Soutar Motorsport	Mercedes-AMG GT4	Mercedes-AMG M178 4.0 L Turbo V8	58	(Australia) Jed Murphy	SA	1–3
(Australia) Murphy Racing by Team Soutar Motorsport	Mercedes-AMG GT4	Mercedes-AMG M178 4.0 L Turbo V8	58	(Australia) Jed Murphy	S	4–5
(Australia) Murphy Racing by Team Soutar Motorsport	Mercedes-AMG GT4	Mercedes-AMG M178 4.0 L Turbo V8	58	(Australia) Sam Brabham	S	4
(Australia) Tufflift Racing by Team Soutar Motorsport	McLaren Artura GT4	McLaren M630 3.0 L Turbo V6	75	(Indonesia) Glenn Nirwan	SA	1–5
(Australia) Tufflift Racing by Team Soutar Motorsport	McLaren Artura GT4	McLaren M630 3.0 L Turbo V6	75	(Australia) Zac Soutar	SA	1–5
(Australia) Team Soutar Motorsport	McLaren Artura GT4	McLaren M630 3.0 L Turbo V6	114	(New Zealand) William Exton	S	1–5
(Australia) Team Soutar Motorsport	McLaren Artura GT4	McLaren M630 3.0 L Turbo V6	114	(Australia) Jack Johnson	S	1–5
(Australia) Ekebol MPC	Ford Mustang GT4 (S650)	Ford Coyote 5.0 L V8	21	(Australia) Jarrod Keyte	SA	1–3
(Australia) Ekebol MPC	Ford Mustang GT4 (S650)	Ford Coyote 5.0 L V8	21	(Australia) Tony D'Alberto	SA	1–2
(Australia) Ekebol MPC	Ford Mustang GT4 (S650)	Ford Coyote 5.0 L V8	21	(Australia) Joshua Thomas	SA	3
(Australia) Ekebol MPC	Ford Mustang GT4 (S650)	Ford Coyote 5.0 L V8	21	(Australia) Jarrod Keyte	Am	4–5
(Australia) Ashley Seward Motorsport	BMW M4 GT4 Evo (G82)	BMW S58B30T0 3.0 L Turbo I6	22	(Australia) Tim Leahey	SA	5
(Australia) Ashley Seward Motorsport	BMW M4 GT4 Evo (G82)	BMW S58B30T0 3.0 L Turbo I6	22	(Australia) Dylan O'Keeffe	SA	5
(Australia) Multispares Racing	Ford Mustang GT4 (S650)	Ford Coyote 5.0 L V8	27	(Australia) Aaron Cameron	S	1–5
(Australia) Multispares Racing	Ford Mustang GT4 (S650)	Ford Coyote 5.0 L V8	27	(Australia) Lochie Dalton	S	1–5
(Australia) RM Racing Cars 1 (Australia) Multispares Racing 2–3, 5	Ford Mustang GT4 (S650)	Ford Coyote 5.0 L V8	227	(Australia) Mason Harvey	S	1–4
(Australia) RM Racing Cars 1 (Australia) Multispares Racing 2–3, 5	Ford Mustang GT4 (S650)	Ford Coyote 5.0 L V8	227	(Australia) Cameron McLeod	S	1–4
(Australia) RM Racing Cars 1 (Australia) Multispares Racing 2–3, 5	Ford Mustang GT4 (S650)	Ford Coyote 5.0 L V8	227	(Australia) Tyler Collins	SA	5
(Australia) RM Racing Cars 1 (Australia) Multispares Racing 2–3, 5	Ford Mustang GT4 (S650)	Ford Coyote 5.0 L V8	227	(Australia) Adam Gowans	SA	5
(New Zealand) Norganic Proteins	Porsche 718 Cayman GT4 RS Clubsport	Porsche MDG.GA 4.0 L Flat-6	28	(Australia) Caleb Paterson	SA	1–5
(New Zealand) Norganic Proteins	Porsche 718 Cayman GT4 RS Clubsport	Porsche MDG.GA 4.0 L Flat-6	28	(Australia) Kent Quinn	SA	1–2, 4–5
(New Zealand) Norganic Proteins	Porsche 718 Cayman GT4 RS Clubsport	Porsche MDG.GA 4.0 L Flat-6	28	(Australia) Scott Green	SA	3
(Australia) Randall Racing	BMW M4 GT4 (G82)	BMW S58B30T0 3.0 L Turbo I6	32	(Australia) Jacob Lawrence	SA	1–2, 5
(Australia) Randall Racing	BMW M4 GT4 (G82)	BMW S58B30T0 3.0 L Turbo I6	32	(Australia) Lachlan Mineeff	SA	1–2, 5
(Australia) Randall Racing	BMW M4 GT4 (G82)	BMW S58B30T0 3.0 L Turbo I6	33	(Australia) Peter Lawrence	Am	1–5
(Australia) Miedecke Motorsport with Lubrimaxx	Ford Mustang GT4 (S650)	Ford Coyote 5.0 L V8	35	(Australia) George Miedecke	S	1–5
(Australia) Miedecke Motorsport with Lubrimaxx	Ford Mustang GT4 (S650)	Ford Coyote 5.0 L V8	35	(Australia) Blake Tracey	S	1–5
(Australia) Miedecke Motorsport with Lubrimaxx	Ford Mustang GT4 (S650)	Ford Coyote 5.0 L V8	95	(Australia) Cooper Cutts	S	1–5
(Australia) Miedecke Motorsport with Lubrimaxx	Ford Mustang GT4 (S650)	Ford Coyote 5.0 L V8	95	(New Zealand) Blake Dowdall	S	1–5
(Australia) Aperitif Racing / Rennen Motorsport	Porsche 718 Cayman GT4 RS Clubsport	Porsche MDG.GA 4.0 L Flat-6	46	(Australia) Jensen Shearer	S	1–5
(Australia) Purdie Racing	Audi R8 LMS GT4 Evo	Audi DAR 5.2 L V10	48	(Australia) Blake Purdie	S	1–5
(Australia) Purdie Racing	Audi R8 LMS GT4 Evo	Audi DAR 5.2 L V10	48	(Australia) Jobe Stewart	S	1–5
(Australia) Catalyst Private Capital	Porsche 718 Cayman GT4 RS Clubsport	Porsche MDG.GA 4.0 L Flat-6	49	(Australia) Charlie Khoury	Am	5
(Australia) Catalyst Private Capital	Porsche 718 Cayman GT4 RS Clubsport	Porsche MDG.GA 4.0 L Flat-6	49	(Australia) Adrian Lee	Am	5
(Australia) Wallis Motorsport	Ford Mustang GT4 (S650)	Ford Coyote 5.0 L V8	62	(Australia) Jack Wallis	S	1–5
(Australia) Wallis Motorsport	Ford Mustang GT4 (S650)	Ford Coyote 5.0 L V8	62	(United States) Sam Paley	S	1–4
(Australia) Wallis Motorsport	Ford Mustang GT4 (S650)	Ford Coyote 5.0 L V8	62	(Australia) Cameron McLeod	S	5
(Australia) JMG Racing / DNA AutoSport	Toyota GR Supra GT4 Evo2	BMW B58B30 3.0 L Turbo I6	67	(New Zealand) Tayler Bryant	S	1–2
(Australia) JMG Racing / DNA AutoSport	Toyota GR Supra GT4 Evo2	BMW B58B30 3.0 L Turbo I6	67	(Australia) Rylan Gray	S	1–2
(Australia) JMG Racing / DNA AutoSport	Toyota GR Supra GT4 Evo2	BMW B58B30 3.0 L Turbo I6	67	(Australia) Jeremy Gray		TBC
(Australia) Exedra Motorsport	Toyota GR Supra GT4 Evo2	BMW B58B30 3.0 L Turbo I6	71	(Australia) Dean Koutsoumidis	SA	1–2, 5
(Australia) Exedra Motorsport	Toyota GR Supra GT4 Evo2	BMW B58B30 3.0 L Turbo I6	71	(Australia) Nicholas McBride	SA	1–2, 5
(Australia) CAMM Quarries & Concrete Racing / BF Racing	Toyota GR Supra GT4 Evo2	BMW B58B30 3.0 L Turbo I6	88	(Australia) Andrew Torti	SA	1–5
(Australia) CAMM Quarries & Concrete Racing / BF Racing	Toyota GR Supra GT4 Evo2	BMW B58B30 3.0 L Turbo I6	88	(Australia) Lachlan Evennett	SA	1–4
(Australia) CAMM Quarries & Concrete Racing / BF Racing	Toyota GR Supra GT4 Evo2	BMW B58B30 3.0 L Turbo I6	88	(Australia) Jesse Dixon	SA	5
(New Zealand) Keltic Racing	Toyota GR Supra GT4 Evo2	BMW B58B30 3.0 L Turbo I6	101	(Australia) Tony Quinn	Am	1
(New Zealand) Keltic Racing	Toyota GR Supra GT4 Evo2	BMW B58B30 3.0 L Turbo I6	101	(New Zealand) Matthew McCutcheon	SA	2–3
(New Zealand) Keltic Racing	Toyota GR Supra GT4 Evo2	BMW B58B30 3.0 L Turbo I6	101	(Australia) Tony Quinn	SA	2–3
(Australia) Edge Motorsport 1 (Australia) Team Komo 2, 5	BMW M4 GT4 (F82)	BMW N55 3.0 L Turbo I6	222	(Australia) Jiawei Chen	S	1–2
(Australia) Edge Motorsport 1 (Australia) Team Komo 2, 5	BMW M4 GT4 (F82)	BMW N55 3.0 L Turbo I6	222	(Australia) Dylan Canto	S	2
(Australia) Edge Motorsport 1 (Australia) Team Komo 2, 5	BMW M4 GT4 (F82)	BMW N55 3.0 L Turbo I6	222	(Australia) Jiawei Chen	SA	5
(Australia) Edge Motorsport 1 (Australia) Team Komo 2, 5	BMW M4 GT4 (F82)	BMW N55 3.0 L Turbo I6	222	(Australia) Le Zhang	SA	5

Icon	Class
S	Silver Cup
SA	Silver-Am Cup
Am	Am Cup

== Race results ==
Bold indicates overall winner

Round		Circuit	Pole position	Silver Winners	Silver-Am Winners	Am Winners	Results
1	R1	(Victoria (state)) Phillip Island	(Australia) No. 25 Method Motorsport	**(Australia) No. 27 Multispares Racing**	(Australia) No. 3 Thunder Buddies Racing	(Australia) No. 64 Method Motorsport	Report
1	R1	(Victoria (state)) Phillip Island	(Australia) Tom Hayman (Australia) Jett Murray	**(Australia) Aaron Cameron** **(Australia) Lochie Dalton**	(New Zealand) Daniel Jilesen (Australia) Ryder Quinn	(Australia) Nathan Callaghan (Australia) Chris Lillis	Report
1	R2	(Victoria (state)) Phillip Island	No. 9 GWR Australia	**(Australia) No. 25 Method Motorsport**	(Australia) No. 118 Method Motorsport	(Australia) No. 14 Gomersall Motorsport	Report
1	R2	(Victoria (state)) Phillip Island	(Australia) Daniel Frougas	**(Australia) Tom Hayman** **(Australia) Jett Murray**	(Australia) Dean Campbell (Australia) Cameron Crick	(Australia) Glenn Walker	Report
2	R1	(South Australia) The Bend	(Australia) No. 88 CAMM Quarries & Concrete Racing	**(Australia) No. 48 Purdie Racing**	(New Zealand) No. 101 Keltic Racing	(Australia) No. 14 Gomersall Motorsport	Report
2	R1	(South Australia) The Bend	(Australia) Lachlan Evennett (Australia) Andrew Torti	**(Australia) Blake Purdie** **(Australia) Jobe Stewart**	(New Zealand) Matthew McCutcheon (Australia) Tony Quinn	(Australia) Glenn Walker	Report
2	R2	(South Australia) The Bend	No. 9 GWR Australia	**(Australia) No. 87 Method Motorsport**	(Australia) No. 3 Thunder Buddies Racing	(Australia) No. 64 Method Motorsport	Report
2	R2	(South Australia) The Bend	(Australia) Daniel Frougas (New Zealand) Chris White	**(Australia) Jarrod Hughes** **(Australia) Summer Rintoule**	(Australia) Steve Jakic (Australia) Ryder Quinn	(Australia) Nathan Callaghan (Australia) Chris Lillis	Report
3	R1	Queensland	(Australia) No. 48 Purdie Racing	**No. 9 GWR Australia**	(New Zealand) No. 101 Keltic Racing	(Australia) No. 64 Method Motorsport	Report
3	R1	Queensland	(Australia) Blake Purdie (Australia) Jobe Stewart	**(Australia) Daniel Frougas** **(New Zealand) Chris White**	(New Zealand) Matthew McCutcheon (Australia) Tony Quinn	(Australia) Nathan Callaghan (Australia) Chris Lillis	Report
3	R2	Queensland	(Australia) No. 25 Method Motorsport	**(Australia) No. 25 Method Motorsport**	(New Zealand) No. 28 Norganic Proteins	(Australia) No. 14 Gomersall Motorsport	Report
3	R2	Queensland	(Australia) Tom Hayman (Australia) Jett Murray	**(Australia) Tom Hayman** **(Australia) Jett Murray**	(Australia) Scott Green (Australia) Caleb Paterson	(Australia) Glenn Walker	Report
4	R1	(Northern Territory) Darwin	(Australia) No. 48 Purdie Racing	**(Australia) No. 114 Team Soutar Motorsport**	(Australia) No. 88 CAMM Quarries & Concrete Racing	(Australia) No. 21 Ekebol MPC	Report
4	R1	(Northern Territory) Darwin	(Australia) Blake Purdie (Australia) Jobe Stewart	**(New Zealand) William Exton** **(Australia) Jack Johnson**	(Australia) Lachlan Evennett (Australia) Andrew Torti	(Australia) Jarrod Keyte	Report
4	R2	(Northern Territory) Darwin	(Australia) No. 46 Aperitif Racing/Rennen Motorsport	**(Australia) No. 25 Method Motorsport**	(Australia) No. 118 Method Motorsport	(Australia) No. 14 Gomersall Motorsport	Report
4	R2	(Northern Territory) Darwin	(Australia) Jensen Shearer	**(Australia) Tom Hayman** **(Australia) Jett Murray**	(Australia) Cody Burcher (Australia) Dean Campbell	(Australia) Glenn Walker	Report
5	R1	(New South Wales) Sydney	(Australia) No. 25 Method Motorsport	**(Australia) No. 114 Team Soutar Motorsport**	(Australia) No. 75 Team Soutar Motorsport	(Australia) No. 14 Gomersall Motorsport	Report
5	R1	(New South Wales) Sydney	(Australia) Tom Hayman (Australia) Jett Murray	**(New Zealand) William Exton** **(Australia) Jack Johnson**	(Indonesia) Glenn Nirwan (Australia) Zac Soutar	(Australia) Glenn Walker	Report
5	R2	(New South Wales) Sydney	(Australia) No. 25 Method Motorsport				
5	R2	(New South Wales) Sydney	(Australia) Tom Hayman (Australia) Jett Murray				
6	R1	(Victoria (state)) Sandown					
6	R2	(Victoria (state)) Sandown					

== Championship standings ==
Scoring system

Position	**1st**	**2nd**	**3rd**	**4th**	**5th**	**6th**	**7th**	**8th**	**9th**	**10th**	**Pole**
Points	25	18	15	12	10	8	6	4	2	1	1

=== Drivers' championship ===
Pos.	Driver	Team	PHI (Victoria (state))		BEN (South Australia)		QLD (Queensland)		HID (Northern Territory)		SYD (New South Wales)		SAN (Victoria (state))	Points
Silver
1	(Australia) Tom Hayman (Australia) Jett Murray	(Australia) Method Motorsport	**4**	1	Ret	17	4	**1**	6	1	**2**	**P**		129
2	(Australia) Aaron Cameron (Australia) Lochie Dalton	(Australia) Multispares Racing	1	23	**15**	5	5	9	4	5	3			97
3	(Australia) Blake Purdie (Australia) Jobe Stewart	(Australia) Purdie Racing	WD	WD	1	8	**2**	10	**7**	2	4			94
4	(Australia) George Miedecke (Australia) Blake Tracey	(Australia) Miedecke Motorsport	7	2	2	10	7	23	2	9	5			90
5	(Australia) Cameron McLeod	(Australia) RM Racing Cars 4 (Australia) Wallis Motorsport 1	2	Ret	7	7	8	2	5	Ret	6			83
6	(New Zealand) William Exton (Australia) Jack Johnson	(Australia) Team Soutar Motorsport	11	6	12	25	18	6	1	Ret	1			76
7	(Australia) Mason Harvey	(Australia) RM Racing Cars	2	Ret	7	7	8	2	5	Ret				75
8	(Australia) Jack Wallis	(Australia) Wallis Motorsport	6	20	Ret	12	13	5	3	8	6			54
9	(Australia) Daniel Frougas	GWR Australia	3	**21**	25	**27**	1	Ret	8	6	7			50
10	(Australia) Jensen Shearer	(Australia) Aperitif Racing	12	3	Ret	14	3	4	11	**13**	15			50
11	(Australia) Jay Murray	(New Zealand) McElrea Racing	9	15	3	13	6	Ret	27	3	12			48
12	(United States) Sam Paley	(Australia) Wallis Motorsport	6	20	Ret	12	13	5	3	8				46
13	(Australia) Jarrod Hughes (Australia) Summer Rintoule	(Australia) Method Motorsport	15	13	20	1	24	3						45
14	(Australia) Cooper Cutts (New Zealand) Blake Dowdall	(Australia) Miedecke Motorsport	24	9	11	11	9	13	15	4	11			39
15	(Australia) Chris White	GWR Australia			25	**27**	1	Ret	8	6				38
16	(Australia) Jake Camilleri	(Australia) Gomersall Motorsport	19	7	10	9	12	7	12	14	16			37
17	(New Zealand) Tayler Bryant (Australia) Rylan Gray	(Australia) DNA Autosport	8	12	6	21								24
18	(Australia) Jed Murphy	(Australia) Team Soutar Motorsport							16	17	17			0
19	(Australia) Sam Brabham	(Australia) Team Soutar Motorsport							16	17				0
20	(Australia) Jiawei Chen	(Australia) Edge Motorsport	29	27	24	23								0
21	(Australia) Dylan Canto	(Australia) Edge Motorsport			24	23								0
22	(Australia) Keelan Dunston	(Australia) Pitstop Racing	26	29										0
Silver-Am
1	(Australia) Ryder Quinn	(Australia) Thunder Buddies Racing	5	8	22	2	19	22	21	15	13			125
2	(Indonesia) Glenn Nirwan (Australia) Zac Soutar	(Australia) Team Soutar Motorsport	18	11	13	**Ret**	17	11	**14**	**11**	**8**			122
3	(Australia) Dean Campbell	(Australia) Method Motorsport	13	4	WD	WD			10	7	9			101
4	(Australia) Steve Jakic	(Australia) Thunder Buddies Racing			22	2	19	22	21	15	13			90
5	(Australia) Caleb Paterson	(New Zealand) Norganic Proteins	Ret	**18**	19	15	**20**	8	25	12	25			73
6	(Australia) Andrew Torti	(Australia) CAMM Quarries & Concrete Racing	16	5	**Ret**	16	11	Ret	9	Ret	29			66
7	(Australia) Lachlan Evennett	(Australia) CAMM Quarries & Concrete Racing	16	5	**Ret**	16	11	Ret	9	Ret				64
8	(New Zealand) Matthew McCutcheon (Australia) Tony Quinn	(New Zealand) Keltic Racing			8	18	14	14						64
9	(Australia) Cody Burcher	(Australia) Method Motorsport							10	7	9			61
10	(Australia) Aaron Seton	(Australia) Gomersall Motorsport	**Ret**	10	WD	WD			13	10	14			56
11	(Australia) Jacob Lawrence (Australia) Lachlan Mineeff	(Australia) Randall Racing	10	16	14	6					19			56
12	(Australia) Dean Koutsoumidis (Australia) Nicholas McBride	(Australia) Exedra Motorsport	21	17	9	3					22			52
13	(Australia) Jarrod Keyte	(Australia) Ekebol MPC	20	14	Ret	4	21	**15**						52
14	(Australia) Kent Quinn	(New Zealand) Norganic Proteins	Ret	**18**	19	15			25	12	25			47
15	(Australia) Jason Gomersall	(Australia) Gomersall Motorsport	**Ret**	10	WD	WD			13	10				46
16	(Australia) Cameron Crick	(Australia) Method Motorsport	13	4										40
17	(New Zealand) Daniel Jilesen	(Australia) Thunder Buddies Racing	5	8										40
18	(Australia) Scott Green	(New Zealand) Norganic Proteins					**20**	8						36
19	(Australia) Tony D'Alberto	(Australia) Ekebol MPC	20	14	Ret	4								31
20	(Australia) Gerry Murphy (Australia) Jed Murphy	(Australia) Team Soutar Motorsport	27	22	26	Ret	25	19						27
21	(Australia) Joshua Thomas	(Australia) Ekebol MPC					21	**15**						21
22	(Australia) Tim Leahey (Australia) Dylan O'Keeffe	(Australia) Ashley Seward Motorsport									10	**P**		16
23	(Australia) Anthony Di Mauro	(Australia) Gomersall Motorsport									14			10
24	(Australia) Jesse Dixon	(Australia) CAMM Quarries & Concrete Racing									29			2
25	(Australia) Tyler Collins (Australia) Adam Gowans	(Australia) Multispares Racing									Ret			0
26	(Australia) Jiawei Chen (Australia) Le Zhang	(Australia) Team Komo									Ret			0
-	(Australia) Tom McLennan	(Australia) Method Motorsport			WD	WD								0
Am
1	(Australia) Glenn Walker	(Australia) Gommersall Motorsport	**17**	**19**	**4**	20	**Ret**	12	18	16	18			183
2	(Australia) Nathan Callaghan (Australia) Chris Lillis	(Australia) Method Motorsport	14	26	5	**19**	10	**16**	**19**	18	21	**P**		175
3	(Australia) Ryan Sorensen	(Australia) Method Motorsport	22	28	16	Ret	23	17	24	19	**20**			105
4	(Australia) Peter Lawrence	(Australia) Randall Racing	25	24	21	24	16	18	23	22	26			99
5	(Australia) Bayley Love	(Australia) Team Soutar Motorsport	23	25	23	22	15	24	20	20				95
6	(Australia) Nathan Murray	(New Zealand) McElrea Racing	31	32	17	26	22	21	22	21	27			74
7	(Australia) Cy Pearson	(Australia) Method Motorsport	30	31	18	28	26	20	26	24	24			64
8	(Australia) Rob Love	(Australia) Team Soutar Motorsport		25	23	22	15	24						60
9	(Australia) Jarrod Keyte	(Australia) Ekebol MPC							17	23	23			44
10	(Australia) Tony Quinn	(New Zealand) Keltic Racing	28	30										16
11	(Australia) Charlie Khoury (Australia) Adrian Lee	(Australia) Catalyst Private Capital									28			4
Pos.	Driver	Team	PHI (Victoria (state))		BEN (South Australia)		QLD (Queensland)		HID (Northern Territory)		SYD (New South Wales)		SAN (Victoria (state))	Points

Colour	Result
Gold	Winner
Silver	Second place
Bronze	Third place
Green	Points classification
Blue	Non-points classification
Blue	Non-classified finish (NC)
Purple	Retired, not classified (Ret)
Red	Did not qualify (DNQ)
Red	Did not pre-qualify (DNPQ)
Black	Disqualified (DSQ)
White	Did not start (DNS)
White	Withdrew (WD)
White	Race cancelled (C)
Blank	Did not practice (DNP)
Blank	Did not arrive (DNA)
Blank	Excluded (EX)

**Bold** – Pole

Italics – Fastest Lap

=== Teams' championship ===
Pos.	Team	PHI (Victoria (state))		BEN (South Australia)		QLD (Queensland)		HID (Northern Territory)		SYD (New South Wales)	SAN (Victoria (state))	Points
1	(Australia) Method Motorsport	**4**	1	5	1	4	**1**	6	1			149
2	(Australia) Multispares Racing	1	23	7	5	5	2	4	5			91
3	(Australia) Purdie Racing	WD	WD	1	8	**2**	10	**7**	2			81
4	(Australia) Miedecke Motorsport	7	5	2	10	7	13	2	4			76
5	GWR Australia	3	**21**	25	**27**	1	Ret	8	6			59
6	(Australia) Team Soutar Motorsport	11	6	12	22	15	6	1	11			49
7	(Australia) Aperitif Racing	12	3	Ret	14	3	4	11	**13**			48
8	(Australia) Wallis Motorsport	6	20	Ret	12	13	5	3	8			45
9	(Australia) Gomersall Motorsport	17	7	4	9	12	7	12	10			43
10	(New Zealand) McElrea Racing	9	15	3	13	6	Ret	22	3			41
11	(Australia) Thunder Buddies Racing	5	8	22	2	19	22	21	15			36
12	(Australia) CAMM Quarries & Concrete Racing	16	5	**Ret**	16	11	Ret	9	Ret			21
13	(Australia) DNA Autosport	8	12	6	21							18
14	(Australia) Exedra Motorsport	21	17	9	3							17
15	(Australia) Ekebol MPC	20	14	Ret	4	21	15	17	23			14
16	(Australia) Randall Racing	10	16	14	6							10
17	(New Zealand) Norganic Products	Ret	18	19	15	20	8	25	12			7
18	(New Zealand) Keltic Racing	28	30	8	18	14	14					5
19	(Australia) Edge Motorsport	29	27	24	23							0
20	(Australia) Pitstop Racing	26	29									0
Pos.	Team	PHI (Victoria (state))		BEN (South Australia)		QLD (Queensland)		HID (Northern Territory)		SYD (New South Wales)	SAN (Victoria (state))	Points

== See also ==
- 2026 British GT Championship
- 2026 GT4 European Series
- 2026 French GT4 Cup
- 2026 GT4 Italian Series
- 2026 GT4 America Series
- 2026 SRO GT Cup
- 2026 SRO Japan Cup
