= 2025 GT4 Australia Series =

The 2025 GT4 Australia Series (commercially titled 2025 Monochrome GT4 Australia Series) was an Australian motorsport competition for GT4 cars. The championship was the 2nd season of a standalone GT4 Australia series having split from the Australian Production Car Series at the end of 2023, and was the second season of the championship being solely managed by the SRO Motorsports Group. The season began on 4 April at Phillip Island Grand Prix Circuit and finished on 2 November at the Hampton Downs Motorsport Park.

== Calendar ==
The provisional six-race meeting calendar was released on 28 June 2024 with 5 rounds to take place in Australia and 1 round to take place in New Zealand. It includes 6 race weekends in support of the 2025 GT World Challenge Australia.

| Round | Circuit | City / State | Date | Map | |
|---|---|---|---|---|---|
| 1 | (Victoria (state)) Phillip Island Grand Prix Circuit | Phillip Island, Victoria | 4–6 April | 2025 GT4 Australia Series is located in Australia | 2025 GT4 Australia Series is located in New Zealand |
| 2 | (New South Wales) Sydney Motorsport Park | Eastern Creek, New South Wales | 2–4 May | 2025 GT4 Australia Series is located in Australia | 2025 GT4 Australia Series is located in New Zealand |
| 3 | Queensland Raceway | Ipswich, Queensland | 30 May–1 June | 2025 GT4 Australia Series is located in Australia | 2025 GT4 Australia Series is located in New Zealand |
| 4 | (Victoria (state)) Sandown Raceway | Melbourne, Victoria | 25–27 July | 2025 GT4 Australia Series is located in Australia | 2025 GT4 Australia Series is located in New Zealand |
| 5 | (South Australia) Shell V-Power Motorsport Park | Tailem Bend, South Australia | 5–7 September | 2025 GT4 Australia Series is located in Australia | 2025 GT4 Australia Series is located in New Zealand |
| 6 | (New Zealand) Hampton Downs Motorsport Park | North Waikato, New Zealand | 31 October–2 November | 2025 GT4 Australia Series is located in Australia | 2025 GT4 Australia Series is located in New Zealand |

== Entry list ==
| Team | Car | Engine | No. | Drivers | Class | Rounds |
|---|---|---|---|---|---|---|
| (Australia) Method Motorsport | Porsche 718 Cayman GT4 RS Clubsport | Porsche MDG 4.0 L Flat-6 | 1 | (Australia) Shane Smollen | Am | 2–4 |
| (Australia) Method Motorsport | Porsche 718 Cayman GT4 RS Clubsport | Porsche MDG 4.0 L Flat-6 | 777 | (Australia) Nathan Callaghan | Am | 1–4 |
| (Australia) Method Motorsport | Porsche 718 Cayman GT4 RS Clubsport | Porsche MDG 4.0 L Flat-6 | 777 | (Australia) Chris Lillis | Am | 1–4 |
| (Australia) Method Motorsport | McLaren Artura GT4 | McLaren M630 3.0 L Turbo V6 | 24 | (Australia) Loclan Hennock | S | 1–4 |
| (Australia) Method Motorsport | McLaren Artura GT4 | McLaren M630 3.0 L Turbo V6 | 24 | (Australia) Nathan Morcom | S | 1–4 |
| (Australia) Method Motorsport | McLaren Artura GT4 | McLaren M630 3.0 L Turbo V6 | 24 | (Australia) John-Paul Drake | S | TBC |
| (Australia) Method Motorsport | McLaren Artura GT4 | McLaren M630 3.0 L Turbo V6 | 25 | (Australia) Max Geoghegan | S | 1–4 |
| (Australia) Method Motorsport | McLaren Artura GT4 | McLaren M630 3.0 L Turbo V6 | 25 | (Australia) Tom Hayman | S | 1–4 |
| (Australia) TekworkX Motorsport | BMW M4 GT4 (G82) | BMW S58B30T0 3.0 L Twin-Turbo I6 | 3 | (Australia) Steve Jakic | SA | 1–2, 4 |
| (Australia) TekworkX Motorsport | BMW M4 GT4 (G82) | BMW S58B30T0 3.0 L Twin-Turbo I6 | 3 | (Australia) Ryder Quinn | SA | 1–2, 4 |
| (Australia) TekworkX Motorsport | Porsche 718 Cayman GT4 Clubsport MR | Porsche 3.8 L Flat-6 | 18 | (Australia) Josh Thomas | S | 2 |
| (Australia) TekworkX Motorsport | Porsche 718 Cayman GT4 Clubsport MR | Porsche 3.8 L Flat-6 | 18 | (Australia) Diesel Thomas | S | 2 |
| (Australia) TekworkX Motorsport | Porsche 718 Cayman GT4 RS Clubsport | Porsche MDG 4.0 L Flat-6 | 210 | (Australia) Nash Morris | S | 1–4 |
| (Australia) TekworkX Motorsport | Porsche 718 Cayman GT4 RS Clubsport | Porsche MDG 4.0 L Flat-6 | 210 | (Australia) Zoe Woods | S | 1–4 |
| (Australia) Property Investment Store | McLaren 570S GT4 | McLaren M838T 3.8 L Turbo V8 | 4 | (Australia) Grant Denyer | Am | 1–2 |
| (Australia) Property Investment Store | McLaren 570S GT4 | McLaren M838T 3.8 L Turbo V8 | 4 | (Australia) Anthony Soole | Am | 1–2 |
| (New Zealand) McElrea Racing | BMW M4 GT4 Evo (G82) | BMW S58B30T0 3.0 L Twin-Turbo I6 | 5 | (Australia) Nathan Murray | Am 1–3; SA 4 | 1–4 |
| (New Zealand) McElrea Racing | BMW M4 GT4 Evo (G82) | BMW S58B30T0 3.0 L Twin-Turbo I6 | 5 | (Australia) Jay Murray | Am 1–3; SA 4 | 4 |
| (Australia) Norwell Factory Racing | McLaren 570S GT4 | McLaren M838T 3.8 L Turbo V8 | 8 | (Australia) Paul Morris | Am | 3 |
| (Australia) Norwell Factory Racing | McLaren 570S GT4 | McLaren M838T 3.8 L Turbo V8 | 8 | (Australia) Chris Pappas | Am | 3 |
| GWR Australia | Toyota GR Supra GT4 Evo2 | BMW B58B30 3.0 L Twin Turbo I6 | 9 | (Australia) Tim Berryman | SA | 1–4 |
| GWR Australia | Toyota GR Supra GT4 Evo2 | BMW B58B30 3.0 L Twin Turbo I6 | 9 | (Australia) Daniel Frougas | SA | 1–4 |
| (Australia) AR Nineteen Motorsport | Mercedes-AMG GT4 | Mercedes-AMG M178 4.0 L Twin-Turbo V8 | 12 | (Australia) John Nikolovski | Am | 1–2, 4 |
| (Australia) AR Nineteen Motorsport | Mercedes-AMG GT4 | Mercedes-AMG M178 4.0 L Twin-Turbo V8 | 19 | (Australia) Mark Griffith | Am | 1–4 |
| (Australia) AR Nineteen Motorsport | Mercedes-AMG GT4 | Mercedes-AMG M178 4.0 L Twin-Turbo V8 | 20 | (Australia) Jamie Arratoon | Am | 1–4 |
| (Australia) Gomersall Motorsport | BMW M4 GT4 (F82) | BMW N55 3.0 L Twin-Turbo I6 | 14 | (Australia) Glenn Walker | Am | 1–4 |
| (Australia) Gomersall Motorsport | Mercedes-AMG GT4 | Mercedes-AMG M178 4.0 L Twin-Turbo V8 | 36 | (Australia) Jake Camilleri | S | 1–3 |
| (Australia) Gomersall Motorsport | Ford Mustang GT4 (2024) | Ford Coyote 5.0 L V8 | 36 | (Australia) Jake Camilleri | S | 4 |
| (Australia) Gomersall Motorsport | Ford Mustang GT4 (2024) | Ford Coyote 5.0 L V8 | 71 | (Australia) Jason Gomersall | SA | 1–4 |
| (Australia) Gomersall Motorsport | Ford Mustang GT4 (2024) | Ford Coyote 5.0 L V8 | 71 | (Australia) Aaron Seton | SA | 1–4 |
| (Australia) Love Racing Team Soutar | Mercedes-AMG GT4 | Mercedes-AMG M178 4.0 L Twin-Turbo V8 | 17 | (Australia) Bailey Love | Am | 1–4 |
| (Australia) Love Racing Team Soutar | Mercedes-AMG GT4 | Mercedes-AMG M178 4.0 L Twin-Turbo V8 | 17 | (Australia) Rob Love | Am | 1–4 |
| (Australia) Love Racing Team Soutar | McLaren Artura GT4 | McLaren M630 3.0 L Turbo V6 | 75 | (Indonesia) Glenn Nirwan | SA | 1–4 |
| (Australia) Love Racing Team Soutar | McLaren Artura GT4 | McLaren M630 3.0 L Turbo V6 | 75 | (Australia) Zac Soutar | SA | 1–4 |
| (Australia) 99Motorsport | Ford Mustang GT4 (2024) | Ford Coyote 5.0 L V8 | 21 | (Australia) Jarrod Keyte | Am | 2–4 |
| (Australia) 99Motorsport | Ford Mustang GT4 (2024) | Ford Coyote 5.0 L V8 | 21 | (Australia) Marcus LaDelle | Am | 2–4 |
| (Australia) Ashley Seward Motorsport | BMW M4 GT4 (G82) | BMW S58B30T0 3.0 L Twin Turbo I6 | 22 | (Australia) Cody Burcher | S | 1–4 |
| (Australia) Ashley Seward Motorsport | BMW M4 GT4 (G82) | BMW S58B30T0 3.0 L Twin Turbo I6 | 22 | (Australia) Tim Leahey | S | 1–4 |
| (Australia) Buckby Motors | Mercedes-AMG GT4 | Mercedes-AMG M178 4.0 L Twin-Turbo V8 | 23 | (Australia) Lachlan Dalton | SA | 1–4 |
| (Australia) Buckby Motors | Mercedes-AMG GT4 | Mercedes-AMG M178 4.0 L Twin-Turbo V8 | 23 | (Australia) Ben Newman | SA | 1–4 |
| (Australia) Zagame Autosport | McLaren Artura GT4 | McLaren M630 3.0 L Turbo V6 | 26 | (Australia) Josh Buchan | SA | 1 |
| (Australia) Zagame Autosport | McLaren Artura GT4 | McLaren M630 3.0 L Turbo V6 | 26 | (Australia) Jason Yu | SA | 1 |
| (Australia) Multispares Racing | Ford Mustang GT4 (2024) | Ford Coyote 5.0 L V8 | 27 | (Australia) Aaron Cameron | SA | 3–4 |
| (Australia) Multispares Racing | Ford Mustang GT4 (2024) | Ford Coyote 5.0 L V8 | 27 | (Australia) Ryan Hansford | SA | 3–4 |
| Ginetta Australia | Ginetta G55 GT4 | Ford Cyclone 3.7 L V6 | 29 | (Australia) Lachlan Mineeff | SA | 1–2 |
| Ginetta Australia | Ginetta G55 GT4 | Ford Cyclone 3.7 L V6 | 29 | (Australia) Rob Rubis | SA | 1–2 |
| Ginetta Australia | Ginetta G56 GT4 | GM LS3 6.2 L V8 | 29 | (Australia) Lachlan Mineeff | SA | 3 |
| Ginetta Australia | Ginetta G56 GT4 | GM LS3 6.2 L V8 | 29 | (Australia) Rob Rubis | SA | 3 |
| Ginetta Australia | Ginetta G56 GT4 | GM LS3 6.2 L V8 | 56 | (Australia) Courtney Prince | S | 1–2 |
| Ginetta Australia | Ginetta G56 GT4 | GM LS3 6.2 L V8 | 56 | (Australia) Valentino Astuti | S | 1–2 |
| (Australia) Randall Racing | BMW M4 GT4 (G82) | BMW S58B30T0 3.0 L Twin-Turbo I6 | 32 | (Australia) Jacob Lawrence | Am | 1–4 |
| (Australia) Randall Racing | BMW M4 GT4 (G82) | BMW S58B30T0 3.0 L Twin-Turbo I6 | 33 | (Australia) Peter Lawrence | Am | 1–4 |
| (Australia) Randall Racing | BMW M4 GT4 (G82) | BMW S58B30T0 3.0 L Twin-Turbo I6 | 33 | (Australia) Jamie Augustine | Am | 1–2 |
| (Australia) Randall Racing | BMW M4 GT4 (F82) | BMW N55 3.0 L Twin-Turbo I6 | 66 | (Australia) Lib Palermo | Am | 1–2 |
| (Australia) Randall Racing | BMW M4 GT4 (F82) | BMW N55 3.0 L Twin-Turbo I6 | 66 | (Australia) Sue Palermo | Am | 1–2 |
| (Australia) Miedecke Motorsport Group with Lubrimaxx | Ford Mustang GT4 (2024) | Ford Coyote 5.0 L V8 | 35 | (Australia) Rylan Gray | S | 1–4 |
| (Australia) Miedecke Motorsport Group with Lubrimaxx | Ford Mustang GT4 (2024) | Ford Coyote 5.0 L V8 | 35 | (Australia) George Miedecke | S | 1–4 |
| (Australia) Miedecke Motorsport Group with DA Campbell Transport | Ford Mustang GT4 (2024) | Ford Coyote 5.0 L V8 | 118 | (Australia) Dean Campbell | SA | 1–4 |
| (Australia) Miedecke Motorsport Group with DA Campbell Transport | Ford Mustang GT4 (2024) | Ford Coyote 5.0 L V8 | 118 | (Australia) Cameron Crick | SA | 1–4 |
| (Australia) Purdie Racing | Audi R8 LMS GT4 Evo | Audi DAR 5.2 L V10 | 48 | (Australia) Daniel Price | S | 1–4 |
| (Australia) Purdie Racing | Audi R8 LMS GT4 Evo | Audi DAR 5.2 L V10 | 48 | (Australia) Blake Purdie | S | 1–4 |
| (Australia) Wallis Motorsport | Ford Mustang GT4 (2024) | Ford Coyote 5.0 L V8 | 62 | (Australia) Jack Wallis | SA | 1, 3–4 |
| (Australia) Wallis Motorsport | Ford Mustang GT4 (2024) | Ford Coyote 5.0 L V8 | 62 | (Australia) Jed Wallis | SA | 1 |
| (Australia) Wallis Motorsport | Ford Mustang GT4 (2024) | Ford Coyote 5.0 L V8 | 62 | (Australia) Adam Wallis | SA | 3–4 |
| (Australia) Wallis Motorsport | Ford Mustang GT4 (2024) | Ford Coyote 5.0 L V8 | 62 | (United States) Jenson Altzman | SA | TBC |
| (Australia) Triple Eight Race Engineering | Mercedes-AMG GT4 | Mercedes-AMG M178 4.0 L Twin-Turbo V8 | 87 | (Australia) Jarrod Hughes | S | 1–4 |
| (Australia) Triple Eight Race Engineering | Mercedes-AMG GT4 | Mercedes-AMG M178 4.0 L Twin-Turbo V8 | 87 | (Australia) Summer Rintoule | S | 1–4 |
| (New Zealand) Keltic Racing | Toyota GR Supra GT4 Evo2 | BMW B58B30 3.0 L Twin Turbo I6 | 101 | (Australia) Tony Quinn | Am 1 SA 2–4 | 1–4 |
| (New Zealand) Keltic Racing | Toyota GR Supra GT4 Evo2 | BMW B58B30 3.0 L Twin Turbo I6 | 101 | (New Zealand) Hugo Allan | Am 1 SA 2–4 | 2 |
| (New Zealand) Keltic Racing | Toyota GR Supra GT4 Evo2 | BMW B58B30 3.0 L Twin Turbo I6 | 101 | (New Zealand) Chris White | Am 1 SA 2–4 | 3 |
| (New Zealand) Keltic Racing | Toyota GR Supra GT4 Evo2 | BMW B58B30 3.0 L Twin Turbo I6 | 101 | (New Zealand) Matthew McCutcheon | Am 1 SA 2–4 | 4 |
| (Australia) Mark Cotterell Motorsport | Ginetta G55 GT4 | Ford Cyclone 3.7 L V6 | 750 | (Australia) Mark Cotterell | Am | 1 |
| (Australia) Mark Cotterell Motorsport | Ginetta G55 GT4 | Ford Cyclone 3.7 L V6 | 750 | (Australia) Chris Whittaker | Am | 1 |

| Icon | Class |
|---|---|
| S | Silver Cup |
| SA | Silver-Am Cup |
| Am | Am Cup |

== Race results ==
Bold indicates overall winner

| Round | | Circuit | Pole position | Silver Winners | Silver-Am Winners | Am Winners | Results |
|---|---|---|---|---|---|---|---|
| 1 | R1 | (Victoria (state)) Phillip Island | (Australia) No. 25 Method Motorsport | **(Australia) No. 25 Method Motorsport** | (Australia) No. 71 Gomersall Motorsport | (Australia) No. 32 Randall Racing | Report |
| 1 | R1 | (Victoria (state)) Phillip Island | (Australia) Max Geoghegan (Australia) Tom Hayman | **(Australia) Max Geoghegan** **(Australia) Tom Hayman** | (Australia) Jason Gomersall (Australia) Aaron Seton | (Australia) Jacob Lawrence | Report |
| 1 | R2 | (Victoria (state)) Phillip Island | (Australia) No. 100 Miedecke Motorsport Group with Lubrimaxx | **(Australia) No. 48 Purdie Racing** | No. 9 GWR Australia | (Australia) No. 32 Randall Racing | Report |
| 1 | R2 | (Victoria (state)) Phillip Island | (Australia) Rylan Gray (Australia) George Miedecke | **(Australia) Daniel Price** **(Australia) Blake Purdie** | (Australia) Tim Berryman (Australia) Daniel Frougas | (Australia) Jacob Lawrence | Report |
| 2 | R1 | (New South Wales) Sydney | (Australia) No. 87 Triple Eight Race Engineering | **(Australia) No. 25 Method Motorsport** | (Australia) No. 118 Miedecke Motorsport Group with DA Campbell Transport | (Australia) No. 1 Method Motorsport | Report |
| 2 | R1 | (New South Wales) Sydney | (Australia) Jarrod Hughes (Australia) Summer Rintoule | **(Australia) Max Geoghegan** **(Australia) Tom Hayman** | (Australia) Dean Campbell (Australia) Cameron Crick | (Australia) Shane Smollen | Report |
| 2 | R2 | (New South Wales) Sydney | (Australia) No. 25 Method Motorsport | **(Australia) No. 35 Miedecke Motorsport Group with Lubrimaxx** | (Australia) No. 71 Gomersall Motorsport | (Australia) No. 1 Method Motorsport | Report |
| 2 | R2 | (New South Wales) Sydney | (Australia) Max Geoghegan (Australia) Tom Hayman | **(Australia) Rylan Gray** **(Australia) George Miedecke** | (Australia) Jason Gomersall (Australia) Aaron Seton | (Australia) Shane Smollen | Report |
| 3 | R1 | Queensland | (Australia) No. 48 Purdie Racing | (Australia) No. 22 Ashley Seward Motorsport | No. 9 GWR Australia | **(Australia) No. 1 Method Motorsport** | Report |
| 3 | R1 | Queensland | (Australia) Daniel Price (Australia) Blake Purdie | (Australia) Cody Burcher (Australia) Tim Leahey | (Australia) Tim Berryman (Australia) Daniel Frougas | **(Australia) Shane Smollen** | Report |
| 3 | R2 | Queensland | (Australia) No. 25 Method Motorsport | **(Australia) No. 35 Miedecke Motorsport Group with Lubrimaxx** | (Australia) No. 118 Miedecke Motorsport Group with DA Campbell Transport | (Australia) No. 32 Randall Racing | Report |
| 3 | R2 | Queensland | (Australia) Max Geoghegan (Australia) Tom Hayman | **(Australia) Rylan Gray** **(Australia) George Miedecke** | (Australia) Dean Campbell (Australia) Cameron Crick | (Australia) Jacob Lawrence | Report |
| 4 | R1 | (Victoria (state)) Sandown Raceway | (Australia) No. 35 Miedecke Motorsport Group with Lubrimaxx | **(Australia) No. 35 Miedecke Motorsport Group with Lubrimaxx** | No. 9 GWR Australia | (Australia) No. 32 Randall Racing | Report |
| 4 | R1 | (Victoria (state)) Sandown Raceway | (Australia) Rylan Gray (Australia) George Miedecke | **(Australia) Rylan Gray** **(Australia) George Miedecke** | (Australia) Tim Berryman (Australia) Daniel Frougas | (Australia) Jacob Lawrence | Report |
| 4 | R2 | (Victoria (state)) Sandown Raceway | (Australia) No. 25 Method Motorsport | **(Australia) No. 36 Gomersall Motorsport** | (Australia) No. 118 Miedecke Motorsport Group with DA Campbell Transport | (Australia) No. 33 Randall Racing | Report |
| 4 | R2 | (Victoria (state)) Sandown Raceway | (Australia) Max Geoghegan (Australia) Tom Hayman | **(Australia) Jake Camilleri** | (Australia) Dean Campbell (Australia) Cameron Crick | (Australia) Peter Lawrence | Report |
| 5 | R1 | (South Australia) Shell V-Power Motorsport Park | (Australia) No. 87 Triple Eight Race Engineering | **(Australia) No. 25 Method Motorsport** | (Australia) No. 27 Multispares Racing | (Australia) No. 33 Randall Racing | |
| 5 | R1 | (South Australia) Shell V-Power Motorsport Park | (Australia) Jarrod Hughes (Australia) Summer Rintoule | **(Australia) Max Geoghegan** **(Australia) Tom Hayman** | (Australia) Aaron Cameron (Australia) Ryan Hansford | (Australia) Jacob Lawrence | |
| 5 | R2 | (South Australia) Shell V-Power Motorsport Park | (Australia) No. 25 Method Motorsport | (Australia) No. 25 Method Motorsport | **(Australia) No. 3 TekworkX Motorsport** | (Australia) No. 777 Method Motorsport | |
| 5 | R2 | (South Australia) Shell V-Power Motorsport Park | (Australia) Max Geoghegan (Australia) Tom Hayman | (Australia) Max Geoghegan (Australia) Tom Hayman | **(Australia) Ryder Quinn** **(Australia) Steve Jakic** | (Australia) Nathan Callaghan (Australia) Chris Lillis | |
| 6 | R1 | (New Zealand) Hampton Downs Motorsport Park | (Australia) No. 25 Method Motorsport | **(Australia) No. 35 Miedecke Motorsport Group with Lubrimaxx** | (Australia) No. 67 Action Motorsport | (Australia) No. 32 Randall Racing | |
| 6 | R1 | (New Zealand) Hampton Downs Motorsport Park | (Australia) Max Geoghegan (Australia) Tom Hayman | **(Australia) Rylan Gray** **(Australia) George Miedecke** | (Australia) Tayler Bryant (Australia) Jeremy Gray | (Australia) Jacob Lawrence | |
| 6 | R2 | (New Zealand) Hampton Downs Motorsport Park | (Australia) No. 25 Method Motorsport | **(Australia) No. 25 Method Motorsport** | (Australia) No. 118 Miedecke Motorsport Group with DA Campbell Transport | (Australia) No. 777 Method Motorsport | |
| 6 | R2 | (New Zealand) Hampton Downs Motorsport Park | (Australia) Max Geoghegan (Australia) Tom Hayman | **(Australia) Max Geoghegan** **(Australia) Tom Hayman** | (Australia) Dean Campbell (Australia) Cameron Crick | (Australia) Nathan Callaghan (Australia) Chris Lillis | |

== Championship standings ==
=== Drivers' championship ===
| Pos. | Driver | Team | PHI (Victoria (state)) | | SYD (New South Wales) | | QLD (Queensland) | | SAN (Victoria (state)) | | BEN (South Australia) | | HAM (New Zealand) | | Points |
| Pos. | Driver | Team | R1 | R2 | R1 | R2 | R1 | R2 | R1 | R2 | R1 | R2 | R1 | R2 | Points |
Silver
| 1 | (Australia) Max Geoghegan (Australia) Tom Hayman | (Australia) Method Motorsport | 1^{P} | 2^{F} | 1 | 4^{PF} | 9 | 13^{P} | 4 | 6^{P} | | | | | 221 |
| 2 | (Australia) Rylan Gray (Australia) George Miedecke | (Australia) Miedecke Motorsport Group with Lubrimaxx | 3 | 3^{P} | 5 | 1 | 15 | 1 | 1^{P} | 3 | | | | | 220 |
| 3 | (Australia) Jarrod Hughes (Australia) Summer Rintoule | (Australia) Triple Eight Race Engineering | 5 | 6 | 2^{PF} | 5 | 10^{F} | 2^{F} | 2^{F} | 4^{F} | | | | | 160 |
| 4 | (Australia) Nash Morris (Australia) Zoe Woods | (Australia) TekworkX Motorsport | 4 | 5 | 4 | 3 | 16 | 3 | 8 | 2 | | | | | 142 |
| 5 | (Australia) Cody Burcher (Australia) Tim Leahey | (Australia) Ashley Seward Motorsport | 6 | 4 | 6 | 2 | 2 | 5 | 6 | 5 | | | | | 115 |
| 6 | (Australia) Jake Camilleri | (Australia) Gomersall Motorsport | 11 | Ret | 3 | 6 | NC | DNS | 5 | 1 | | | | | 99 |
| 7 | (Australia) Daniel Price (Australia) Blake Purdie | (Australia) Purdie Racing | 2^{F} | 1^{F} | 12 | 13 | NC^{P} | 6 | 18 | 19 | | | | | 94 |
| 8 | (Australia) Loclan Hennock (Australia) Nathan Morcom | (Australia) Method Motorsport | 13 | 12 | 7 | 8 | 11 | NC | 24 | 15 | | | | | 49 |
| 9 | (Australia) Jay Murray | | | | | | | | | | | | | | 8 |
| 10 | (Australia) Josh Thomas (Australia) Diesel Thomas | (Australia) TekworkX Motorsport | | | 8 | 18 | | | | | | | | | 6 |
| 11 | (Australia) Courtney Prince (Australia) Valentino Astuti | Ginetta Australia | Ret | 23 | WD | WD | | | | | | | | | 4 |
| 12 | (Australia) Jack Wallis (United States) Jenson Altzman | (Australia) Wallis Motorsport | | | | | | | | | | | | | 4 |
Silver-Am
| 1 | (Australia) Jason Gomersall (Australia) Aaron Seton | (Australia) Gomersall Motorsport | 7^{PF} | 8 | 19^{P} | 7^{P} | 13^{P} | 10 | 7^{F} | 12 | | | | | 214 |
| 2 | (Australia) Dean Campbell (Australia) Cameron Crick | (Australia) Miedecke Motorsport Group with DA Campbell Transport | 8 | 10^{P} | 9 | 12 | 14 | 4^{F} | 15 | 8 | | | | | 175 |
| 3 | (Australia) Tim Berryman (Australia) Daniel Frougas | GWR Australia | 21 | 7 | 14 | 11 | 4 | 17 | 3 | 23 | | | | | 148 |
| 4 | (Australia) Steve Jakic (Australia) Ryder Quinn | (Australia) TekworkX Motorsport | 9 | 19 | 13 | 10 | | | 13^{P} | 9^{F} | | | | | 103 |
| 5 | (Indonesia) Glenn Nirwan (Australia) Zac Soutar | (Australia) Love Racing Team Soutar | 15 | Ret | 10 | 14 | 17 | NC | 10 | 22 | | | | | 99 |
| 6 | (Australia) Aaron Cameron (Australia) Ryan Hansford | (Australia) Multispares Racing | | | | | 8 | DNS^{P} | 12 | 16^{P} | | | | | 83 |
| 7 | (Australia) Tony Quinn | (New Zealand) Keltic Racing | | | 20 | 9^{F} | 12 | 11 | 9 | NC | | | | | 79 |
| 8 | (Australia) Lochie Dalton (Australia) Ben Newman | (Australia) Buckby Motors | 10 | 11^{F} | WD | WD | 23^{F} | 9 | 14 | 17 | | | | | 62 |
| 9 | (Australia) Lachlan Mineeff (Australia) Rob Rubis | Ginetta Australia | 17 | 9 | 16^{F} | NC | 20 | NC | | | | | | | 43 |
| 10 | (New Zealand) Chris White | (New Zealand) Keltic Racing | | | | | 12 | 11 | | | | | | | 40 |
| 11 | (Australia) Jay Murray (Australia) Nathan Murray | (New Zealand) McElrea Racing | | | | | | | 19 | 20 | | | | | 36 |
| 12 | (New Zealand) Hugo Allan | (New Zealand) Keltic Racing | | | 20 | 9^{F} | | | | | | | | | 24 |
| 13 | (Australia) Josh Buchan (Australia) Jason Yu | (Australia) Zagame Autosport | 12 | 13 | | | | | | | | | | | 18 |
| 14 | (New Zealand) Matthew McCutcheon | (New Zealand) Keltic Racing | | | | | | | 9 | NC | | | | | 15 |
| 15 | (Australia) Lochlan Hennock (Australia) John-Paul Drake | | | | | | 22 | NC | WD | WD | | | | | 14 |
| 16 | (Australia) Jack Wallis (Australia) Adam Wallis | (Australia) Wallis Motorsport | DNS | DNS | | | 22 | NC | WD | WD | | | | | 4 |
| 17 | (Australia) Jed Wallis | (Australia) Wallis Motorsport | DNS | DNS | | | | | | | | | | | 0 |
Am
| 1 | (Australia) Jacob Lawrence | (Australia) Randall Racing | 14 | 14 | 18^{F} | 21^{F} | 18 | 7^{F} | 11 | 14 | | | | | 217 |
| 2 | (Australia) Nathan Callaghan (Australia) Chris Lillis | (Australia) Method Motorsport | 16 | Ret^{PF} | 15 | 19 | 19 | 8 | 20^{PF} | 11^{PF} | | | | | 167 |
| 3 | (Australia) Peter Lawrence | (Australia) Randall Racing | 19^{PF} | 15 | NC | 16 | 24 | 14 | 21 | 7 | | | | | 142 |
| 4 | (Australia) Shane Smollen | (Australia) Method Motorsport | | | 11 | 15^{P} | 1^{F} | 19^{P} | 16 | 13 | | | | | 133 |
| 5 | (Australia) Jarrod Keyte (Australia) Marcus LaDelle | (Australia) 99Motorsport | | | 25^{P} | 20 | 3^{P} | 18 | 17 | 18 | | | | | 122 |
| 6 | (Australia) Glenn Walker | (Australia) Gomersall Motorsport | 18 | 16 | 17 | 17 | NC | 16 | NC | 10 | | | | | 116 |
| 7 | (Australia) Bailey Love (Australia) Rob Love | (Australia) Love Racing Team Soutar | 20 | 17 | NC | 22 | 6 | NC | NC | DNS | | | | | 75 |
| 8 | (Australia) Rob Love | (Australia) Love Racing Team Soutar | 20 | 17 | NC | 22 | 6 | NC | NC | DNS | | | | | 65 |
| 9 | (Australia) Jamie Augustine | (Australia) Randall Racing | 19^{PF} | 15 | NC | 16 | | | | | | | | | 63 |
| 10 | (Australia) Jamie Arratoon | (Australia) AR Nineteen Motorsport | Ret | DNS | 24 | 23 | 5 | 12 | 23 | NC | | | | | 60 |
| 11 | (Australia) Mark Griffith | (Australia) AR Nineteen Motorsport | 25 | 18 | 21 | 24 | NC | 20 | 25 | NC | | | | | 40 |
| 12 | (Australia) John Nikolovski | (Australia) AR Nineteen Motorsport | 24 | 20 | 23 | NC | | | 22 | 21 | | | | | 36 |
| 13 | (Australia) Nathan Murray | (New Zealand) McElrea Racing | 26 | 25 | 22 | 25 | 7 | 15 | | | | | | | 27 |
| 14 | (Australia) Tony Quinn | (New Zealand) Keltic Racing | 22 | 21 | | | | | | | | | | | 14 |
| 15 | (Australia) Lib Palermo | (Australia) Randall Racing | 27 | 24 | 26 | NC | | | | | | | | | 13 |
| 16 | (Australia) Mark Cotterell (Australia) Chris Whittaker | (Australia) Mark Cotterell Motorsport | 23 | 22 | | | | | | | | | | | 10 |
| 17 | (Australia) Paul Morris (Australia) Chris Pappas | (Australia) Norwell Factory Racing | | | | | 21 | NC | | | | | | | 4 |
| 18 | (Australia) Suzanne Palermo | | | | | | | | | | | | | | 3 |
| 19 | (Australia) Grant Denyer (Australia) Anthony Soole | (Australia) Property Investment Store | DNS | DNS | DNS | DNS | | | | | | | | | 0 |
| Pos. | Driver | Team | R1 | R2 | R1 | R2 | R1 | R2 | R1 | R2 | R1 | R2 | R1 | R2 | Points |
| Pos. | Driver | Team | PHI (Victoria (state)) | | SYD (New South Wales) | | QLD (Queensland) | | SAN (Victoria (state)) | | BEN (South Australia) | | HAM (New Zealand) | | Points |

Key
| Colour | Result |
|---|---|
| Gold | Race winner |
| Silver | 2nd place |
| Bronze | 3rd place |
| Green | Points finish |
| Blue | Non-points finish |
| Blue | Non-classified finish (NC) |
| Purple | Did not finish (Ret) |
| Black | Disqualified (DSQ) |
| Black | Excluded (EX) |
| White | Did not start (DNS) |
| White | Race cancelled (C) |
| White | Withdrew (WD) |
| Blank | Did not participate |

^{P} – Pole
^{F} – Fastest Lap

== See also ==
- 2025 British GT Championship
- 2025 GT4 European Series
- 2025 French GT4 Cup
- 2025 GT4 America Series
- 2025 SRO GT Cup
- 2025 SRO Japan Cup
