= 2024 GT4 Australia Series =

Sports season

The 2024 GT4 Australia Series (commercially titled 2024 Monochrome GT4 Australia Series) was an Australian motorsport competition for GT4 cars. The championship was the inaugural running of a standalone GT4 Australia series having split from the Australian Production Car Series at the end of 2023, and was the first season of the championship being solely managed by the SRO Motorsports Group. Events were held on the Australian Racing Group's SpeedSeries bill, with the season starting on 14 April at Phillip Island Grand Prix Circuit and ending on 10 November at Mount Panorama Circuit.

== Calendar ==
The provisional six-race calendar was released on 17 November 2023 with all rounds taking place in Australia. The calendar was finalized on 9 May 2024, alongside the announcement of the GT Festival, the first-ever event promoted by SRO Motorsports Australia.

Round	Circuit	City / State	Date	Supporting	Duration	Map of circuit locations
1	(Victoria (state)) Phillip Island Grand Prix Circuit	Phillip Island, Victoria	12–14 April	GT World Challenge Australia	2 x 60mins	2024 GT4 Australia Series is located in Australia
2	(South Australia) The Bend Motorsport Park	Tailem Bend, South Australia	31 May – 2 June	GT World Challenge Australia	2 x 60mins	2024 GT4 Australia Series is located in Australia
3	Queensland Raceway	Ipswich, Queensland	2–4 August	GT World Challenge Australia	1 x 60mins 1 x 3 Hours	2024 GT4 Australia Series is located in Australia
4	(Victoria (state)) Phillip Island Grand Prix Circuit	Phillip Island, Victoria	23–25 August	GT World Challenge Australia	2 x 60mins	2024 GT4 Australia Series is located in Australia
5	(New South Wales) Sydney Motorsport Park	Eastern Creek, New South Wales	18–20 October	GT World Challenge Australia	2 x 60mins	2024 GT4 Australia Series is located in Australia
6	(New South Wales) Mount Panorama Circuit	Bathurst, New South Wales	8–10 November	GT World Challenge Australia	2 x 60mins	2024 GT4 Australia Series is located in Australia
Cancelled events
	(Victoria (state)) Sandown Raceway	Melbourne, Victoria	9–11 February	TCR Australia Touring Car Series	3 Hours	

- A non-championship 3-hour race was scheduled to be held at Sandown Raceway but was cancelled due to shipping delays.

== Entry list ==
Team	Car	Engine	No.	Drivers	Class	Rounds
(Australia) Method Motorsport	Porsche 718 Cayman GT4 RS Clubsport	Porsche MDG 4.0 L Flat-6	1	(Australia) Lachlan Mineeff	PA	All
(Australia) Method Motorsport	Porsche 718 Cayman GT4 RS Clubsport	Porsche MDG 4.0 L Flat-6	1	(Australia) Shane Smollen	PA	All
(Australia) Method Motorsport	McLaren Artura GT4	McLaren M630 3.0 L Turbo V6	24	(Australia) Nathan Morcom	S	1–3
(Australia) Method Motorsport	McLaren Artura GT4	McLaren M630 3.0 L Turbo V6	24	(Australia) Tom McLennan	S	2–3
(Australia) Method Motorsport	McLaren Artura GT4	McLaren M630 3.0 L Turbo V6	24	(Australia) Jesse Bryan	S	1
(Australia) Method Motorsport	McLaren Artura GT4	McLaren M630 3.0 L Turbo V6	24	(Australia) Anthony Levitt	Am 4 PA 6	4–6
(Australia) Method Motorsport	McLaren Artura GT4	McLaren M630 3.0 L Turbo V6	24	(Australia) Luke King	Am 4 PA 6	4
(Australia) Method Motorsport	McLaren Artura GT4	McLaren M630 3.0 L Turbo V6	25	(Australia) Marcos Flack	S	All
(Australia) Method Motorsport	McLaren Artura GT4	McLaren M630 3.0 L Turbo V6	25	(Australia) Tom Hayman	S	All
(Australia) Thunder Buddies Racing	BMW M4 GT4 (G82)	BMW S58B30T0 3.0 L Twin Turbo I6	3	(Australia) Steve Jakic	PA	All
(Australia) Thunder Buddies Racing	BMW M4 GT4 (G82)	BMW S58B30T0 3.0 L Twin Turbo I6	3	(Australia) Ryder Quinn	PA	All
(Australia) Property Investment Store	McLaren 570S GT4	McLaren M838T 3.8 L Turbo V8	4	(Australia) Anthony Soole	Am	5–6
(Australia) Property Investment Store	McLaren 570S GT4	McLaren M838T 3.8 L Turbo V8	4	(Australia) Grant Denyer	Am	6
(Australia) Gee Up	McLaren 570S GT4	McLaren M838T 3.8 L Turbo V8	8	(Australia) Chris Pappas	Am	TBA
(Australia) Nemo Racing	McLaren 570S GT4	McLaren M838T 3.8 L Turbo V8	8	(Australia) Nash Morris	PA	4
(Australia) Nemo Racing	McLaren 570S GT4	McLaren M838T 3.8 L Turbo V8	8	(Australia) Paul Morris	PA	4
(Australia) Verve Racing	Audi R8 LMS GT4 Evo	Audi DAR 5.2 L V10	11	(Australia) Steve Jukes	Am	4
(Australia) GB Galvanising Racing	Porsche 718 Cayman GT4 Clubsport MR	Porsche MA1.24 3.8 L Flat-6	12	(Australia) Vince Gucciardo	Am	1–2
(Australia) Gomersall Motorsport	BMW M4 GT4 (G82)	BMW S58B30T0 3.0 L Twin Turbo I6	14	(Australia) Glenn Walker	Am	5
(Australia) Gomersall Motorsport	Mercedes-AMG GT4	Mercedes-AMG M178 4.0 L Twin-Turbo V8	36	(Australia) Jake Camilleri	S	All
(Australia) Gomersall Motorsport	Mercedes-AMG GT4	Mercedes-AMG M178 4.0 L Twin-Turbo V8	36	(Australia) Aaron Seton	S	3
(Australia) Gomersall Motorsport	Ford Mustang GT4 (2024)	Ford 5.0 L Coyote V8	71	(Australia) Jason Gomersall	Am 5 PA 6	5–6
(Australia) Gomersall Motorsport	Ford Mustang GT4 (2024)	Ford 5.0 L Coyote V8	71	(Australia) Aaron Seton	Am 5 PA 6	6
(Australia) Love Racing (Note: Car No. 17 entered as Love Racing in rounds 1 and 2, and as Love Racing by Volante Rosso Motorsport in rounds 3 and 4. Car No. 27 entered as Love Racing in rounds 1 to 3, and as Love Racing by Volante Rosso Motorsport in round 4.)	Mercedes-AMG GT4	Mercedes-AMG M178 4.0 L Twin-Turbo V8	17	(Australia) Bailey Love	S 1–2; PA 3 Am 4	All
(Australia) Love Racing	Mercedes-AMG GT4	Mercedes-AMG M178 4.0 L Twin-Turbo V8	17	(Australia) Sam Brabham	S 1–2; PA 3 Am 4	1–3
(Australia) Love Racing	Mercedes-AMG GT4	Mercedes-AMG M178 4.0 L Twin-Turbo V8	17	(Australia) Rob Love	S 1–2; PA 3 Am 4	4–6
(Australia) Love Racing	Mercedes-AMG GT4	Mercedes-AMG M178 4.0 L Twin-Turbo V8	27	(Australia) Antonio Astuti	PA 1–3; S 4	1–5
(Australia) Love Racing	Mercedes-AMG GT4	Mercedes-AMG M178 4.0 L Twin-Turbo V8	27	(Australia) Rob Love	PA 1–3; S 4	1–3
(Australia) Love Racing	Mercedes-AMG GT4	Mercedes-AMG M178 4.0 L Twin-Turbo V8	27	(Australia) Sam Brabham	PA 1–3; S 4	4–5
(Australia) Nineteen Corporation	Mercedes-AMG GT4	Mercedes-AMG M178 4.0 L Twin-Turbo V8	19	(Australia) Mark Griffith	Am 1–2, 4 PA 3	All
(Australia) Nineteen Corporation	Mercedes-AMG GT4	Mercedes-AMG M178 4.0 L Twin-Turbo V8	19	(Australia) Nash Morris	Am 1–2, 4 PA 3	3
(Australia) Nineteen Corporation	Ginetta G56 GT4	GM LS3 6.2 L V8	56	(Australia) Jesse Bryan	S	4
(Australia) Nineteen Corporation	Ginetta G56 GT4	GM LS3 6.2 L V8	56	(Australia) Oscar Target	S	4
(Australia) Central West Prestige BMW (Note: Car No. 22 operated by Ashley Seward Motorsport.)	BMW M4 GT4 (G82)	BMW S58B30T0 3.0 L Twin Turbo I6	22	(Australia) Tim Leahey	Am 1 S 2, 4	1–2, 4–6
(Australia) Central West Prestige BMW	BMW M4 GT4 (G82)	BMW S58B30T0 3.0 L Twin Turbo I6	22	(Australia) Cody Burcher	Am 1 S 2, 4	4–6
(Australia) Buckby Motors	Mercedes-AMG GT4	Mercedes-AMG M178 4.0 L Twin-Turbo V8	23	(United Kingdom) Ben Newman	Am; PA	1, 3, 5–6
(Australia) Buckby Motors	Mercedes-AMG GT4	Mercedes-AMG M178 4.0 L Twin-Turbo V8	23	(United Kingdom) Eddie Maguire	Am; PA	1
(Australia) Buckby Motors	Mercedes-AMG GT4	Mercedes-AMG M178 4.0 L Twin-Turbo V8	23	(Australia) Beric Lynton	Am; PA	3
(Australia) Buckby Motors	Mercedes-AMG GT4	Mercedes-AMG M178 4.0 L Twin-Turbo V8	23	(Australia) Lachlan Dalton	Am; PA	5–6
(Australia) Team DNA Racing	McLaren Artura GT4	McLaren M630 3.0 L Turbo V6	26	(China) Jason Yu	PA	1–2, 5–6
(Australia) Team DNA Racing	McLaren Artura GT4	McLaren M630 3.0 L Turbo V6	26	(Australia) Josh Buchan	PA	1–2, 5
(Australia) Team DNA Racing	McLaren Artura GT4	McLaren M630 3.0 L Turbo V6	26	(Australia) John Collins	PA	6
(Australia) Mackay Goodwin Lloyds Auctions	Ginetta G55 GT4	Ford Cyclone 3.7 L V6	29	(Australia) Rob Rubis	Am	2–3, 5–6
(Australia) Mackay Goodwin Lloyds Auctions	Ginetta G55 GT4	Ford Cyclone 3.7 L V6	29	(Australia) Scott Turner	Am	2–3, 5–6
(Australia) Randall Racing	BMW M4 GT4 (G82)	BMW S58B30T0 3.0 L Twin Turbo I6	32	(Australia) Jacob Lawrence	Am	All
(Australia) Randall Racing	BMW M4 GT4 (G82)	BMW S58B30T0 3.0 L Twin Turbo I6	32	(Australia) John Bowe	Am	1, 3–6
(Australia) Randall Racing	BMW M4 GT4 (F82)	BMW N55 3.0 L Twin-Turbo I6	33	(Australia) Jamie Augustine	Am	1
(Australia) Randall Racing	BMW M4 GT4 (F82)	BMW N55 3.0 L Twin-Turbo I6	33	(Australia) Peter Lawrence	Am	1
(Australia) Randall Racing	BMW M4 GT4 (G82)	BMW S58B30T0 3.0 L Twin Turbo I6	33	(Australia) Jamie Augustine	Am	2–6
(Australia) Randall Racing	BMW M4 GT4 (G82)	BMW S58B30T0 3.0 L Twin Turbo I6	33	(Australia) Peter Lawrence	Am	2–6
(Australia) Miedecke Motorsport Group with Lubrimaxx	Ford Mustang GT4 (2024)	Ford 5.0 L Coyote V8	35	(Australia) Rylan Gray	S	All
(Australia) Miedecke Motorsport Group with Lubrimaxx	Ford Mustang GT4 (2024)	Ford 5.0 L Coyote V8	35	(Australia) George Miedecke	S	All
(New Zealand) Game Over by Keltic Racing	Mercedes-AMG GT4	Mercedes-AMG M178 4.0 L Twin-Turbo V8	101	(Australia) Tony Quinn	Am 1 PA 2–3	1–2
(New Zealand) Game Over by Keltic Racing	Mercedes-AMG GT4	Mercedes-AMG M178 4.0 L Twin-Turbo V8	101	(New Zealand) Jackson Rooney	Am 1 PA 2–3	2
(New Zealand) Game Over by Keltic Racing	Porsche 718 Cayman GT4 RS Clubsport	Porsche MDG 4.0 L Flat-6	101	(Australia) Tony Quinn	Am 1 PA 2–3	3, 5–6
(New Zealand) Game Over by Keltic Racing	Porsche 718 Cayman GT4 RS Clubsport	Porsche MDG 4.0 L Flat-6	101	(New Zealand) Matthew McCutcheon	Am 1 PA 2–3	3
(Australia) TekworkX Motorsport	Porsche 718 Cayman GT4 Clubsport MR	Porsche MA1.24 3.8 L Flat-6	210	(Australia) Zoe Woods	S PA	All
(Australia) TekworkX Motorsport	Porsche 718 Cayman GT4 Clubsport MR	Porsche MA1.24 3.8 L Flat-6	210	(Australia) Daniel Stutterd	S PA	3
(Australia) TekworkX Motorsport	Porsche 718 Cayman GT4 Clubsport MR	Porsche MA1.24 3.8 L Flat-6	210	(Australia) Tom McLennan	S PA	4
(Australia) TekworkX Motorsport	Porsche 718 Cayman GT4 Clubsport MR	Porsche MA1.24 3.8 L Flat-6	210	(Australia) Daniel Jilesen	S PA	5–6
(Australia) TekworkX Motorsport	Porsche 718 Cayman GT4 Clubsport MR	Porsche MA1.24 3.8 L Flat-6	290	(Australia) Lachlan Evennett	PA	5
(Australia) TekworkX Motorsport	Porsche 718 Cayman GT4 Clubsport MR	Porsche MA1.24 3.8 L Flat-6	290	(Australia) Rob Woods	PA	5
(Australia) TekworkX Motorsport	Porsche 718 Cayman GT4 Clubsport MR	Porsche MA1.24 3.8 L Flat-6	290	(Australia) Andrew Georgiadis	Am	6
(Australia) TekworkX Motorsport	Porsche 718 Cayman GT4 Clubsport MR	Porsche MA1.24 3.8 L Flat-6	290	(Australia) Ramu Farrell	Am	6
(Australia) Mark Cotterell Motorsport	Ginetta G55 GT4	Ford Cyclone 3.7 L V6	750	(Australia) Mark Cotterell	PA	1–3, 5
(Australia) Mark Cotterell Motorsport	Ginetta G55 GT4	Ford Cyclone 3.7 L V6	750	(Australia) Jarrod Hughes	PA	1–3, 5

Icon	Class
S	Silver Cup
PA	Pro-Am Cup
Am	Am Cup

Notes:

- Gee Up and Chris Pappas were originally set to compete in the opening round at Phillip Island, but later withdrew.

== Race results ==
Bold indicates overall winner

Round		Circuit	Pole position	Silver Winners	Pro/Am Winners	Am Winners	Results
1	R1	(Victoria (state)) Phillip Island	(Australia) No. 17 Love Racing by EMS	**(Australia) No. 35 Miedecke Motorsport Group**	(Australia) No. 26 DNA AutoSport	(Australia) No. 22 Central West Prestige BMW	Result
1	R1	(Victoria (state)) Phillip Island	(Australia) Sam Brabham (Australia) Bailey Love	**(Australia) Rylan Gray** **(Australia) George Miedecke**	(Australia) Josh Buchan (China) Jason Yu	(Australia) Tim Leahey	Result
1	R2	(Victoria (state)) Phillip Island	(Australia) No. 35 Miedecke Motorsport Group	**(Australia) No. 35 Miedecke Motorsport Group**	(Australia) No. 1 Method Motorsport	(Australia) No. 22 Central West Prestige BMW	Result
1	R2	(Victoria (state)) Phillip Island	(Australia) Rylan Gray (Australia) George Miedecke	**(Australia) Rylan Gray** **(Australia) George Miedecke**	(Australia) Lachlan Mineeff (Australia) Shane Smollen	(Australia) Tim Leahey	Result
2	R1	(South Australia) The Bend	(Australia) No. 26 Zagame Autosport	**(Australia) No. 25 Method Motorsport**	(Australia) No. 1 Method Motorsport	(Australia) No. 32 Randall Racing	Result
2	R1	(South Australia) The Bend	(Australia) Josh Buchan (China) Jason Yu	**(Australia) Tom Hayman** **(Australia) Marcos Flack**	(Australia) Lachlan Mineeff (Australia) Shane Smollen	(Australia) Jacob Lawrence	Result
2	R2	(South Australia) The Bend	(Australia) No. 25 Method Motorsport	**(Australia) No. 35 Miedecke Motorsport Group**	(Australia) No. 1 Method Motorsport	(Australia) No. 32 Randall Racing	Result
2	R2	(South Australia) The Bend	(Australia) Tom Hayman (Australia) Marcos Flack	**(Australia) Rylan Gray** **(Australia) George Miedecke**	(Australia) Lachlan Mineeff (Australia) Shane Smollen	(Australia) Jacob Lawrence	Result
3	R1	Queensland	(Australia) No. 750 Mark Cotterell Motorsport	**(Australia) No. 24 Method Motorsport**	(Australia) No. 3 Thunder Buddies Racing	(Australia) No. 32 Randall Racing	Result
3	R1	Queensland	(Australia) Mark Cotterell (Australia) Jarrod Hughes	**(Australia) Tom McLennan** **(Australia) Nathan Morcom**	(Australia) Steve Jakic (Australia) Ryder Quinn	(Australia) John Bowe (Australia) Jacob Lawrence	Result
3	R2	Queensland		**(Australia) No. 35 Miedecke Motorsport Group**	(New Zealand) No. 101 Game Over by Keltic Racing	(Australia) No. 32 Randall Racing	Result
3	R2	Queensland		**(Australia) Rylan Gray** **(Australia) George Miedecke**	(New Zealand) Matthew McCutcheon (Australia) Tony Quinn	(Australia) John Bowe (Australia) Jacob Lawrence	Result
4	R1	(Victoria (state)) Phillip Island	(Australia) No. 35 Miedecke Motorsport Group	**(Australia) No. 22 Central West Prestige BMW**	(Australia) No. 1 Method Motorsport	(Australia) No. 24 Method Motorsport	Result
4	R1	(Victoria (state)) Phillip Island	(Australia) Rylan Gray (Australia) George Miedecke	**(Australia) Cody Burcher** **(Australia) Tim Leahey**	(Australia) Lachlan Mineeff (Australia) Shane Smollen	(Australia) Anthony Levitt	Result
4	R2	(Victoria (state)) Phillip Island	(Australia) No. 35 Miedecke Motorsport Group	**(Australia) No. 22 Central West Prestige BMW**	(Australia) No. 3 Thunder Buddies Racing	(Australia) No. 19 Nineteen Corporation	Result
4	R2	(Victoria (state)) Phillip Island	(Australia) Rylan Gray (Australia) George Miedecke	**(Australia) Cody Burcher** **(Australia) Tim Leahey**	(Australia) Steve Jakic (Australia) Ryder Quinn	(Australia) Mark Griffith	Result
5	R1	(New South Wales) Sydney	(Australia) No. 3 Thunder Buddies Racing	**(Australia) No. 25 Method Motorsport**	(Australia) No. 210 TekworkX Motorsport	(Australia) No. 32 Randall Racing	Result
5	R1	(New South Wales) Sydney	(Australia) Steve Jakic (Australia) Ryder Quinn	**(Australia) Tom Hayman** **(Australia) Marcos Flack**	(Australia) Zoe Woods (Australia) Daniel Jilesen	(Australia) John Bowe (Australia) Jacob Lawrence	Result
5	R2	(New South Wales) Sydney	(Australia) No. 22 Central West Prestige BMW	**(Australia) No. 25 Method Motorsport**	(Australia) No. 26 Zagame Autosport	(Australia) No. 24 Method Motorsport	Result
5	R2	(New South Wales) Sydney	(Australia) Cody Burcher (Australia) Tim Leahey	**(Australia) Tom Hayman** **(Australia) Marcos Flack**	(Australia) Josh Buchan (China) Jason Yu	(Australia) Anthony Levitt	Result
6	R1	(New South Wales) Bathurst	(Australia) No. 23 Buckby Motors	**(Australia) No. 22 Central West Prestige BMW**	(Australia) No. 71 Gomersall Motorsport	(Australia) No. 4 Property Investment Store	Result
6	R1	(New South Wales) Bathurst	(United Kingdom) Ben Newman (Australia) Lachlan Dalton	**(Australia) Cody Burcher** **(Australia) Tim Leahey**	(Australia) Jason Gomersall (Australia) Aaron Seton	(Australia) Anthony Soole (Australia) Grant Denyer	Result
6	R2	(New South Wales) Bathurst	(Australia) No. 35 Miedecke Motorsport Group	**(Australia) No. 35 Miedecke Motorsport Group**	(Australia) No. 23 Buckby Motors	(Australia) No. 4 Property Investment Store	Result
6	R2	(New South Wales) Bathurst	(Australia) Rylan Gray (Australia) George Miedecke	**(Australia) Rylan Gray** **(Australia) George Miedecke**	(United Kingdom) Ben Newman (Australia) Lachlan Dalton	(Australia) Anthony Soole (Australia) Grant Denyer	Result

== See also ==
- 2024 British GT Championship
- 2024 GT4 European Series
- 2024 French GT4 Cup
- 2024 GT4 America Series
- 2024 GT World Challenge Asia
