= Jarrod Hughes =

Australian racing driver (born 2005)

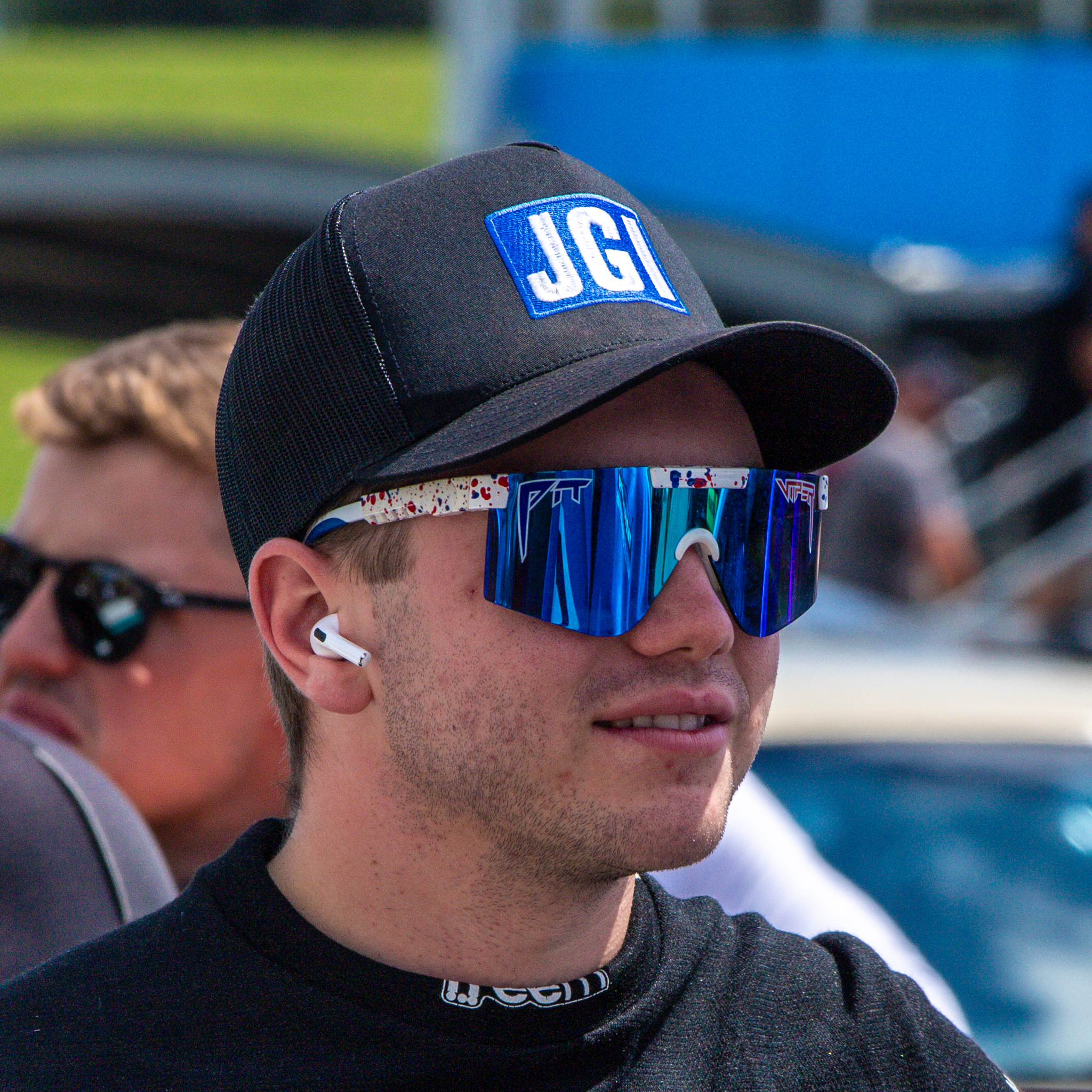
- Hughes in 2025
- Nationality: (Australia) Australian
- Born: Jarrod Michael Hughes; 18 February 2005 (age 21) Brisbane, Australia

GT4 Australia Series career
- Debut season: 2024
- Current team: Method Motorsport
- Categorisation: FIA Silver
- Car number: 87
- Former teams: Mark Cotterell Motorsport; Triple Eight Race Engineering
- Starts: 24
- Wins: 1
- Podiums: 12
- Poles: 3
- Fastest laps: 8
- Best finish: 3rd in 2025

Championship titles
- 2025 2022: TA2 Racing Muscle Car Series; Queensland Excel Series

Jarrod Michael Hughes (born 18 February 2005) is an Australian racing driver who last competed for Method Motorsport in the GT4 Australia Series, IES Motorsport in the Australian National Trans-Am Series and for Erebus Motorsport in Supercars Championship in the Pirtek Enduro Cup.

== Career ==
Hughes made his car racing debut in 2020, racing in the EFS Excel Cup Series. The following year, Hughes moved to the Toyota Gazoo Racing Australia 86 Series, in which he contested the full season but wasn't classified as no points were given after not enough rounds took place. Returning to the series the following year, Hughes scored his only win of the season at Sandown en route to a seventh-place points finish and earning the Kaizen award, in a year in which he won the Series X3 Queensland title.

In 2023, Hughes mainly competed in the Toyota Gazoo Racing Australia 86 Series for his own team, scoring three podiums and finishing fifth in points, and also made his TA2 Racing Muscle Car Series debut late in the year, in which he finished second on debut behind Nash Morris. The following year, Hughes joined Image Racing to make his Super2 debut, with whom he took pole with at Sandown, and scored a best race result of fourth three times to end the year fourth in points as the highest-placed rookie. During 2024, Hughes also competed in GT4 Australia and the TA2 Racing Muscle Car Series, in which he most notably took two wins in the latter series at Calder Park alongside Tyler Cheney.

Hughes returned to Super2 and Image Racing in 2025, only taking a best result of eighth at Townsville as he ended the year 18th in the standings. In parallel to his Super2 campaign, Hughes also returned to the TA2 Racing Muscle Car Series with IES Motorsport, and took eight wins en route to his maiden TA2 title, whilst also finishing runner-up in the TA2 Kings of the West sub-championship. Hughes also returned to GT4 Australia, joining Triple Eight Race Engineering alongside Summer Rintoule, with whom he finished third in the Silver Cup standings after scoring eight podiums across the 12-race season. During 2025, Hughes made his Supercars debut as Jack Le Brocq's co-driver at Erebus Motorsport for the Enduro Cup.

Ahead of 2026, Hughes was retained by Erebus Motorsport as their co-driver for the endurance races of the following year's Supercars Championship season. During 2026, Hughes also joined Method Motorsport for his third season in GT4 Australia, as well as returning to IES Motorsport to race in the Australian National Trans Am Series. In Trans-Am, Hughes won twice in Wanneroo and scored three other podiums to end the year sixth in points.

== Karting record ==
=== Karting career summary ===
Season	Series	Position
2018	Australian Kart Championship — KA2	14th
2019	Australian Kart Championship — KA2	15th

== Racing record ==
=== Racing career summary ===
Season	Series	Team	Races	Wins	Poles	F/Laps	Podiums	Points	Position
2020	EFS 4x4 Accessories Excel Invitational	JLX Productions	3	0	0	0	0	6	23rd
2021	Toyota Gazoo Racing Australia 86 Series		8	0	0	0	0	0	– (Note: Championship was declared null and void as not enough events were completed.)
2022	Toyota Gazoo Racing Australia 86 Series	ACDelco / JGI	15	1	2	1	3	860	7th
2022	Queensland Excel Series		12	8	?	?	11	?	**1st**
2022	Circuit Excel Racing Association Nationals		4	0	0	1	2	0	9th
2023	Toyota Gazoo Racing Australia 86 Series	Jarrod Hughes Motorsport	15	0	0	1	3	1002	5th
2023	EFS 4x4 Accessories Australian Excel Cup		4	0	0	0	0	276	6th
2023	TA2 Racing Muscle Car Series	Team RSG	4	0	0	0	1	0	NC
2024	Super2 Series	Image Racing	12	0	1	0	0	1167	4th
2024	GT4 Australia Series – Pro-Am	Mark Cotterell Motorsport	8	0	0	0	3	69	7th
2024	TA2 Racing Muscle Car Series	PHD Motorsport	8	2	1	2	6	0	NC
2025	Super2 Series	Image Racing	11	0	0	0	0	543	18th
2025	TA2 Racing Muscle Car Series	IES Motorsport	17	8	3	8	15	1100	**1st**
2025	TA2 Kings of the West	IES Motorsport	4	2	1	3	4	226	**2nd**
2025	Trico Trans-Am Series	IES Motorsport	6	0	0	0	0	63	20th
2025	GT4 Australia Series – Silver	Triple Eight Race Engineering	12	0	5	7	3	160	**3rd**
2025	Supercars Championship	Erebus Motorsport	2	0	0	0	0	0	NC
2026	GT4 Australia Series – Silver	Method Motorsport	4	1	0	0	1	30*	6th*
2026	Australian National Trans Am Series	IES Motorsport	18	2	1	2	5	227	6th
2026	TA2 Racing Muscle Car Series	IES Motorsport	4	0	0	0	0	0	NC†*
2026	Supercars Championship	Erebus Motorsport	4	0	0	0	0	263*	38th*
2026–27	TA2 NZ Championship	Waltec Motorsport						*	*

=== Complete Bathurst 6 Hour results ===
Year	Team	Co-drivers	Car	Class	Laps	Pos.	Class pos.
2022	(Australia) Levitt Motorsports	(Australia) Luke King (Australia) Darren Whittington	Renault Clio	C	0	WD	WD
2025	(Australia) IES Motorsport	(Australia) Tim Brook (Australia) G.Cheney	Ford Mustang Mach 1	A2	103	DNF	DNF

=== Super2 Series results ===
(key) (Race results only)

Super2 Series results
Year	Team	No.	Car	1	2	3	4	5	6	7	8	9	10	11	12	Position	Points
2024	Image Racing	118	Holden Commodore ZB	BAT1; R1; 5	BAT1; R2; 9	BAR; R3; 7	BAR; R4; 18	TOW; R5; 6	TOW; R6; 10	SAN; R7; 6	**SAN**; **R8**; 11	BAT2; R9; 4	BAT2; R10; 5	ADE; R11; 4	ADE; R12; 4	4th	1167
2025	Image Racing	118	Holden Commodore ZB	SMP; R1; 13	SMP; R2; 20	SYM; R3; Ret	SYM; R4; 10	TOW; R5; 8	TOW; R6; 13	QLD; R7; Ret	QLD; R8; DNS	BAT; R9; 13	BAT; R10; Ret	ADE; R11; 12	ADE; R12; 15	18th	543

=== Supercars Championship results ===
Supercars results
Year	Team	No.	Car	1	2	3	4	5	6	7	8	9	10	11	12	13	14	15	16	17	18	19	20	21	22	23	24	25	26	27	28	29	30	31	32	33	34	35	36	37	Position	Points
2025	Erebus Motorsport	9	Chevrolet Camaro ZL1	SYD; R1	SYD; R2	SYD; R3	MEL; R4	MEL; R5	MEL; R6	MEL; R7	TAU; R8	TAU; R9	TAU; R10	SYM; R11	SYM; R12	SYM; R13	BAR; R14	BAR; R15	BAR; R16	HID; R17	HID; R18	HID; R19	TOW; R20	TOW; R21	TOW; R22	QLD; R23	QLD; R24	QLD; R25	BEN; R26; 12	BAT; R27; 14	SUR; R28	SUR; R29	SAN; R30	SAN; R31	ADE; R32	ADE; R33	ADE; R34				40th	221
2026	Erebus Motorsport	9	Chevrolet Camaro ZL1	SYD; R1	SYD; R2	SYD; R3	MEL; R4	MEL; R5	MEL; R6	MEL; R7	TAU; R8	TAU; R9	CHR; R10	CHR; R11	CHR; R12	CHR; R13	SYM; R14	SYM; R15	SYM; R16	BAR; R17	BAR; R18	BAR; R19	HID; R20	HID; R21	HID; R22	TOW; R23	TOW; R24	TOW; R25	QLD; R26	QLD; R27	QLD; R28	BEN; R28; 15	BAT; R30; 16	SUR; R31; 19	SUR; R32; 16	SAN; R33	SAN; R34	ADE; R35	ADE; R36	ADE; R37	38th	263

=== Complete Bathurst 1000 results ===
Year	Team	Car	Co-driver	Position	Laps
2025	Erebus Motorsport	Chevrolet Camaro Mk.6	(Australia) Jack Le Brocq	14th	161
2026	Erebus Motorsport	Chevrolet Camaro Mk.6	(Australia) Jobe Stewart	14th	161

=== Complete GT4 Australia Series results ===
(key) (Races in bold indicate pole position) (Races in italics indicate fastest lap)

Year	Team	Car	Class	1	2	3	4	5	6	7	8	9	10	11	12	Pos	Points
2024	Mark Cotterell Motorsport	Ginetta G55 GT4	Pro-Am	PHI; R1; 2	PHI; R2; 2	BEN; R3; DNS	BEN; R4; DNS	**QLD**; **R5**; Ret	QLD; R6; 5	PHI; R7	PHI; R8	SMP; R9; 7	SMP; R10; 8	BAT; R11	BAT; R12	7th	69
2025	Triple Eight Race Engineering	Mercedes-AMG GT4	Silver	PHI; R1; 5	PHI; R2; 6	**SMP**; **R3**; 2	SMP; R4; 5	QLD; R5; 10	QLD; R6; 2	SAN; R7; 2	SAN; R8; 4	**BEN**; **R9**; 3	BEN; R10; 2	HAM; R11; 3	HAM; R12; 3	3rd	160
2026	Method Motorsport	McLaren Artura GT4	Silver	PHI; 1; 15	PHI; 2; 13	BEN; 1; 20	BEN; 2; 1	QLD; 1; 24	QLD; 2; 3	HID; 1	HID; 2	SYD; 1	SYD; 2	ADL; 1	ADL; 2	13th	45

=== Australian TransAm Series results ===
Year	Team	Car	1	2	3	4	5	6	7	8	9	10	11	12	13	14	15	16	17	18	19	20	21	Position	Points
2025	IES Motorsports	Chevrolet Camaro	SYM; R1; 15	SYM; R2; 13	SYM; R3; 8	SYM; R4; 11	BAT; R1; 6	BAT; R2; 10	HID; R1	HID; R2	HID; R3	SAN; R1	SAN; R2	SAN; R3	BEN; R1	BEN; R2	BEN; R3	MAL; R1	MAL; R2	MAL; R3	ADE; R1	ADE; R2	ADE; R3	20th	63
2026	IES Motorsports	Chevrolet Camaro	BAT; R1; 4	BAT; R2; 5	BAT; R3; 2	HID; R1; 2	HID; R2; 2	HID; R3; 5	WAN; R1; 3	WAN; R2; 1	WAN; R3; 1	QLD; R1; 12	QLD; R2; 6	QLD; R3; 16	BEN; R1; 20	BEN; R2; 11	BEN; R3; 12	SAN1; R1; DSQ	SAN1; R2; 10	SAN1; R3; 11	SAN2; R1	SAN2; R2	SAN2; R3	6th	227
