= Ryder Quinn =

Australian racing driver (born 2005)

- Nationality: (Australia) Australian
- Born: 2005 (age 20–21) Gold Coast, Queensland, Australia
- Relatives: Klark Quinn (father)
- Categorisation: FIA Silver

Ryder Zan Quinn (born 2005) is an Australian racing driver competing in the GT4 Australia Series for Thunder Buddies Racing.

== Personal life ==
Quinn's grandfather, Tony Quinn, is a British-born businessman and racing driver, founder of the Tony Quinn Foundation and the Quinn Group, whereas his father Klark is a three-time Australian GT champion. His uncle Kent, who completed the three-generation Bathurst 12 Hour quartet in 2026, is also a racing driver. Quinn's step-dad is Steve Jakic, his teammate in GT4 Australia since 2024.

== Career ==
Quinn made his car racing debut in 2021, racing in the Queensland Formula Ford Championship, as well as making select appearances in the Aussie Racing Car Series. Stepping up to Australian Formula Ford for 2022, he scored his maiden win in race three at Morgan Park, before taking two further wins at Sydney en route to a fourth-place points finish. During 2022, Quinn also returned to the Aussie Racing Car Series, scoring a best result of fourth at Winton to end the season 10th in points.

Continuing in single-seaters for 2023, Quinn joined M2 Competition to race in the Formula Regional Oceania Championship. In his only full-season in the series, Quinn scored a pair of third-place finishes in the reverse-grid races at Highlands and Teretonga to take seventh in the overall standings. For the rest of the year, Quinn joined McElrea Racing to race in Porsche Carrera Cup Australia, in which he scored a best result of fifth in race one at Adelaide to end the year 16th in the Pro standings. During 2023, Quinn also won the Bathurst 6 Hour in the A2 class for Local Legends.

At the start of 2024, Quinn returned to M2 Competition to race at the final round of that year's Formula Regional Oceania Championship at Highlands, a track owned by his grandfather Tony. In the three races, Quinn scored a best result of eighth at the New Zealand Grand Prix. Returning to McElrea Racing to compete in Porsche Carrera Cup Australia for the rest of the year, Quinn scored a lone podium at the season-opening round in Melbourne, as he ended the season 10th in points. In parallel, Quinn raced in GT4 Australia alongside his step-father Steve Jakic for BMW-fielding Thunder Buddies Racing, scoring Pro-Am wins at Queensland and Phillip Island and five other podiums to secure runner-up honors in class.

Switching to TekworkX Motorsport for the 2025 GT4 Australia Series, Quinn scored an outright and Silver-Am win at Tailem Bend and four other class podiums en route to a fourth-place points finish. At the start of the following year, Quinn raced at the Bathurst 12 Hour for Quinn Racing Team MPC alongside his father Klark, his uncle Kent and his grandfather Tony, as they finished eighth in the Bronze class driving an Audi R8 LMS Evo II. For the rest of 2026, Quinn returned to Thunder Buddies Racing for his third season in GT4 Australia as a new member of the BMW M Racing Academy.

== Racing record ==
=== Racing career summary ===
Season	Series	Team	Races	Wins	Poles	F/Laps	Podiums	Points	Position
2021	Queensland Formula Ford Championship – FF1600	BF Racing/Local Legends Racing	17	3	0	0	11		**2nd**
2021	Aussie Racing Car Series	Local Legends Racing	6	0	0	0	0		
2022	Formula Ford Australia	BF Racing	21	2	1	2	10	216	4th
2022	Victorian Formula Ford Duratec Championship	BF Racing	3	0	0	0	0	28	25th
2022	Aussie Racing Car Series	Local Legends Racing	12	0	0	0	0	251	10th
2023	Formula Regional Oceania Championship	M2 Competition	15	0	0	0	2	199	7th
2023	Porsche Carrera Cup Australia – Pro	McElrea Racing	19	0	0	0	0	277	16th
2023	Hi-Tec Oils Bathurst 6 Hour – A2	Local Legends	1	1	0	0	1	—N/a	**1st**
2023	Battery World Aussie Racing Cars Super Series	Tony Quinn Motorsports	4	0	0	0	2		
2024	Formula Regional Oceania Championship	M2 Competition	3	0	0	0	0	28	22nd
2024	Porsche Carrera Cup Australia – Pro	McElrea Racing	24	0	0	0	1	533	10th
2024	GT4 Australia Series – Pro-Am	Thunder Buddies Racing	12	2	2	5	7	179	**2nd**
2024	Hi-Tec Oils Bathurst 6 Hour – A2	Keltic Racing	1	0	0	0	0	—N/a	DNF
2025	GT4 Australia Series – Silver-Am	TekworkX Motorsport	8	1	1	2	5	103	4th
2025	Hi-Tec Oils Bathurst 6 Hour – A2	Game Over	1	0	0	0	0	—N/a	DNF
2025–26	GT New Zealand Championship		2	0	0	0	0	133.5*	7th*
2026	Bathurst 12 Hour – Bronze	Quinn Racing Team MPC	1	0	0	0	0	—N/a	8th
2026	GT4 Australia Series – Silver-Am	Thunder Buddies Racing						*	*
2026	Hi-Tec Oils Bathurst 6 Hour – A2	Keltic Racing						—N/a	

=== Complete Formula Regional Oceania Championship results ===
(key) (Races in bold indicate pole position) (Races in italics indicate fastest lap)

Year	Team	1	2	3	4	5	6	7	8	9	10	11	12	13	14	15	DC	Points
2023	M2 Competition	HIG; 1; 7	HIG; 2; 3	HIG; 3; 4	TER; 1; 7	TER; 2; 3	TER; 3; 7	MAN; 1; 13	MAN; 2; 13	MAN; 3; 7	HMP; 1; 9	HMP; 2; 17	HMP; 3; 10	TAU; 1; 9	TAU; 2; 8	TAU; 3; 13	7th	199
2024	M2 Competition	TAU; 1	TAU; 2	TAU; 3	MAN; 1	MAN; 2	MAN; 3	HMP; 1	HMP; 2	HMP; 3	RUA; 1	RUA; 2	RUA; 3	HIG; 1; 12	HIG; 2; 13	HIG; 3; 8	22nd	28

=== Complete GT4 Australia Series results ===
(key) (Races in bold indicate pole position) (Races in italics indicate fastest lap)

Year	Team	Car	Class	1	2	3	4	5	6	7	8	9	10	11	12	Pos	Points
2024	Thunder Buddies Racing	BMW M4 GT4 (G82)	Pro-Am	PHI; R1; DSQ	PHI; R2; Ret	BEN; R3; 13	BEN; R4; 7	QLD; R5; 5	QLD; R6; 8	PHI; R7; 12	PHI; R8; 6	SMP; R9; 5	SMP; R10; 7	BAT; R11; 6	BAT; R12; 7	2nd	179
2025	TekworkX Motorsport	BMW M4 GT4 (G82)	Silver-Am	PHI; R1; 9	PHI; R2; 19	SMP; R3; 13	SMP; R4; 10	QLD; R5	QLD; R6	SAN; R7; 13	SAN; R8; 9	BEN; R9; DSQ	BEN; R10; 1	HAM; R11	HAM; R12	4th	103
2025	Thunder Buddies Racing	BMW M4 GT4 (G82)	Silver-Am	PHI; R1; 5	PHI; R2; 15	BEN; R3	BEN; R4	QLD; R5	QLD; R6	HID; R7	HID; R8	SMP; R9	SMP; R10	SAN; R11	SAN; R12	2nd*	33*

=== Complete Bathurst 12 Hours results ===
Year	Team	Co-Drivers	Car	Class	Laps	Pos.	Class Pos.
2026	(Australia) Quinn Racing Team MPC	(Australia) Kent Quinn (Australia) Klark Quinn (Australia) Tony Quinn	Audi R8 LMS Evo II	GT3 Bronze	254	18th	8th
