= Rylan Gray =

Australian racing driver

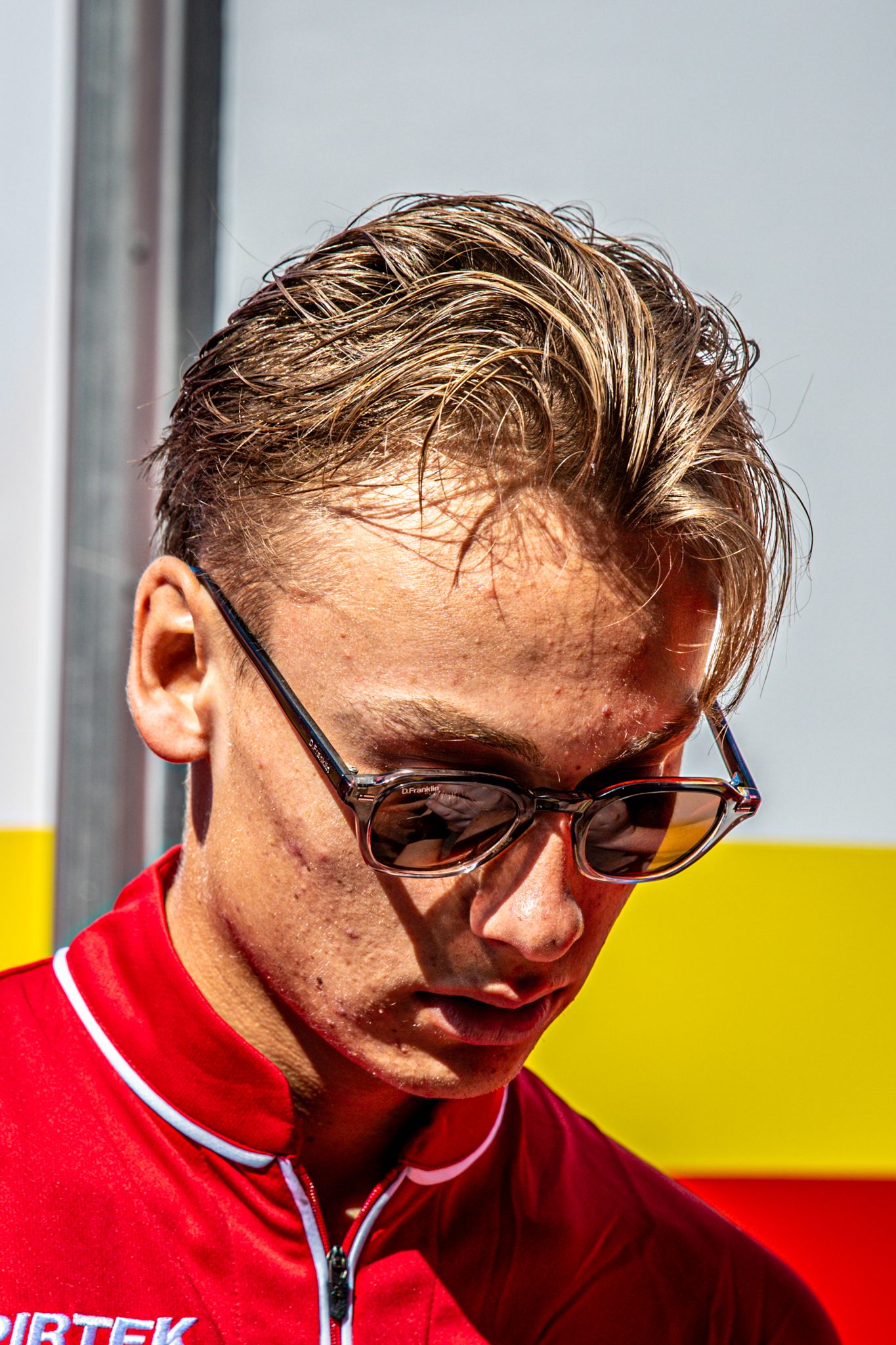
- Gray at Sydney Motorsport Park in 2026
- Nationality: Australian
- Born: Rylan Thomas Gray; 21 November 2006 (age 19) Muswellbrook, New South Wales, Australia

Supercars Championship career
- Debut season: 2025
- Current team: Dick Johnson Racing
- Categorisation: FIA Silver
- Car number: 38
- Former teams: Tickford Racing
- Starts: 30
- Wins: 0
- Podiums: 0
- Poles: 0
- Best finish: 29th in 2025

Previous series
- 2022 2022–23 2022–23 2023 2023 2023 2024 2024 2024-25: Australian Circuit Hyundai Excel Nationals; GR Cup; Aussie Racing Cars; Toyota 86 Championship New Zealand; ADAC GT4 Germany; Super3 Series; GT4 Australia; Touring Car Masters; Super2 Series

Championship titles
- 2025: Dunlop Super2 Series

Rylan Thomas Gray (born 21 November 2006) is a racing driver from Australia who currently competes in the Supercars Championship, Driving the #38 Ford Mustang GT for Dick Johnson Racing.

== Biography ==
Gray's career began in motocross as a toddler before switching to cars at 14, initially in Hyundai Excels before stepping up to Toyota 86 competition. Having finished fifth in the New Zealand series, Tickford Racing signed Gray to their academy program leading to his V8 Supercar debut in Super3 at the Adelaide 500 where he scored a class podium. The Denman resident was promoted to Super2 in 2024, finishing on the podium in both races at Bathurst en route to the round win and seventh in the standings.

Through his results in New Zealand Toyota 86, Gray made a cameo in the 2023 ADAC GT4 Germany series at the Nürburgring with KCMG, finishing 20th and tenth across the races with co-driver Brock Gilchrist. In 2024, he competed in GT4 Australia with Miedecke Motorsport – alongside George Miedecke, the team won the Ford Mustang GT4's first race outside North America in the opening round at Phillip Island and narrowly missed out on the championship to Method Motorsport.

Gray is the son of former V8 Utes and Touring Car Masters driver Jeremy Gray.

== Career results ==
=== Summary ===
| Season | Series | Position | Car | Team |
|---|---|---|---|---|
| 2022 | Australian Circuit Hyundai Excel Nationals | 7th | Hyundai Excel X3 | N/A |
| 2022 | Toyota Gazoo Racing Australia 86 Series | 48th | Toyota 86 | JMG Racing |
| 2022 | Aussie Racing Cars | 22nd | ARC Camaro | N/A |
| 2023 | Toyota 86 Championship New Zealand | 5th | Toyota 86 | Action Motorsport |
| 2023 | Aussie Racing Cars | 22nd | ARC Camaro | Rylan Gray Motorsport |
| 2023 | Toyota Gazoo Racing Australia 86 Series | N/A | Toyota 86 | JMG Racing |
| 2023 | ADAC GT4 Germany | IE | Toyota GR Supra GT4 | KCMG |
| 2023 | Super3 Series | 10th | Ford Falcon FG X | Tickford Racing |
| 2024 | Super2 Series | 7th | Ford Mustang S550 | Tickford Racing |
| 2024 | GT4 Australia Series | 2nd | Ford Mustang S650 GT4 | Miedecke Motorsport |
| 2024 | Touring Car Masters | N/A | Ford Capri | JMG Racing |
| 2025 | Super2 Series | 1st | Ford Mustang S550 | Tickford Autosport |
| 2025 | Supercars Championship | 29th | Ford Mustang S650 | Tickford Racing |
| 2025 | GT4 Australia Series | 2nd | Ford Mustang S650 GT4 | Miedecke Motorsport |

=== GT4 Australia Championship results ===
GT4 Australia results
| Year | Team | Car | 1 | 2 | 3 | 4 | 5 | 6 | 7 | 8 | 9 | 10 | 11 | 12 | 13 | 14 | Position | Points |
|---|---|---|---|---|---|---|---|---|---|---|---|---|---|---|---|---|---|---|
| 2024 | Miedecke Motorsport Group | Ford Mustang GT4 | SAN; R1; C | SAN; R2; C | PHI; R3; 1 | PHI; R4; 1 | BEN; R5; DSQ | BEN; R6; 1 | QLD; R7; 3 | QLD; R8; 1 | PHI; R9; 4 | PHI; R10; Ret | SMP; R11; 2 | SMP; R12; 5 | BAT; R13; 2 | BAT; R14; 1 | 2nd | 237 |
| 2025 | Miedecke Motorsport Group | Ford Mustang GT4 | PHI; R1; 3 | PHI; R2; 3 | SMP; R3; 5 | SMP; R4; 1 | QLD; R5; 5 | QLD; R6; 1 | SAN; R7 | SAN; R8 | BEN; R9 | BEN; R10 | HAM; R11 | HAM; R12 | | | 2nd* | 103* |

=== Super3 Series results ===
(key) (Race results only)

Super3 Series results
| Year | Team | No. | Car | 1 | 2 | 3 | 4 | 5 | 6 | 7 | 8 | 9 | 10 | 11 | 12 | Position | Points |
|---|---|---|---|---|---|---|---|---|---|---|---|---|---|---|---|---|---|
| 2023 | Tickford Racing | 55 | Ford FG X Falcon | NEW; R1 | NEW; R2 | BAR; R3 | BAR; R4 | TOW; R5 | TOW; R6 | SAN; R7 | SAN; R8 | BAT; R9 | BAT; R10 | ADE; R11; 2 | ADE; R12; 4 | 10th | 258 |

=== Super2 Series results ===
(key) (Race results only)

Super2 Series results
| Year | Team | No. | Car | 1 | 2 | 3 | 4 | 5 | 6 | 7 | 8 | 9 | 10 | 11 | 12 | Position | Points |
|---|---|---|---|---|---|---|---|---|---|---|---|---|---|---|---|---|---|
| 2024 | Tickford Racing | 55 | Ford Mustang S550 | BAT1; R1; 4 | BAT1; R2; 6 | BAR; R3; 18 | BAR; R4; Ret | TOW; R5; 4 | TOW; R6; 15 | SAN; R7; 14 | SAN; R8; 16 | BAT2; R9; 3 | BAT2; R10; 3 | ADE; R11; 5 | ADE; R12; 6 | 7th | 1044 |
| 2025 | Tickford Racing | 55 | Ford Mustang S550 | SMP; R1; 3 | SMP; R2; 9 | SYM; R3; 1 | SYM; R4; 3 | TOW; R5; 3 | TOW; R6; 3 | QLD; R7; 1 | QLD; R8; 5 | BAT; R9; 2 | BAT; R10; 1 | ADE; R11; 1 | ADE; R12; 4 | 1st | 1419 |

=== Supercars Championship results ===
Supercars results
| Year | Team | Car | 1 | 2 | 3 | 4 | 5 | 6 | 7 | 8 | 9 | 10 | 11 | 12 | 13 | 14 | 15 | 16 | 17 | 18 | 19 | 20 | 21 | 22 | 23 | 24 | 25 | 26 | 27 | 28 | 29 | 30 | 31 | 32 | 33 | 34 | 35 | 36 | 37 | Position | Points | |
|---|---|---|---|---|---|---|---|---|---|---|---|---|---|---|---|---|---|---|---|---|---|---|---|---|---|---|---|---|---|---|---|---|---|---|---|---|---|---|---|---|---|---|
| 2025 | Tickford Racing | 5 | Ford Mustang S650 | SYD; R1 | SYD; R2 | SYD; R3 | MEL; R4 | MEL; R5 | MEL; R6 | MEL; R7 | TAU; R8 | TAU; R9 | TAU; R10 | SYM; R11 | SYM; R12 | SYM; R13 | BAR; R14 | BAR; R15 | BAR; R16 | HID; R17; 21 | HID; R18; 21 | HID; R19; 21 | TOW; R20 | TOW; R21 | TOW; R22 | QLD; R23 | QLD; R24 | QLD; R25 | BEN; R26; 22 | BAT; R27; 13 | SUR; R28 | SUR; R29 | SAN; R30 | SAN; R31 | ADE; R32 | ADE; R33 | ADE; R34 | | | | 29th | 218 |
| 2026 | Dick Johnson Racing | 38 | Ford Mustang S650 | SMP; R1; 20 | SMP; R2; 19 | SMP; R3; 11 | MEL; R4; 17 | MEL; R5; 15 | MEL; R6; 17 | MEL; R7; 14 | TAU; R8; 15 | TAU; R9; 21 | CHR; R10; 14 | CHR; R11; 11 | CHR; R12; 10 | CHR; R13; Ret | SYM; R14; 18 | SYM; R15; 16 | SYM; R16; 23 | HID; R20; 21 | HID; R21; 13 | HID; R22; 17 | TOW; R23; 17 | TOW; R24; 17 | TOW; R25; 15 | BAR; R17; 10 | BAR; R18; 17 | BAR; R19; 23 | QLD; R26; 7 | QLD; R27; 25 | QLD; R28; 8 | BEN; R28; 10 | BAT; R30; 22 | SUR; R31; 17 | SUR; R32; 15 | SAN; R33 | SAN; R34 | ADE; R35 | ADE; R36 | ADE; R37 | 19th* | 968* |

=== Bathurst 12 Hour results ===
| Year | Team | Co-drivers | Car | Class | Laps | Position | Class pos. |
|---|---|---|---|---|---|---|---|
| 2024 | (Australia) MRA Motorsport | (Australia) Darren Currie (Australia) Axel Donaldson | MARC II V8 | I | 198 | DNF | |
