= 2022 Aussie Racing Car Series =

Motor racing competition

2022 Aussie Racing Cars

Seasons
- ← 2021 2023 →

The 2022 Battery World Aussie Racing Car Super Series was an Australian motor racing series for Aussie Racing Cars, which are silhouette racing cars which use Yamaha FJ1300 engines and Kumho Tyres. The series commenced at Sydney Motorsport Park on 4 March, and concluded on 21 August at Sandown Raceway. While there was no official defending series champion as a result of curtailment of the 2021 season caused by pandemic restrictions, Kody Garland was the unofficial defending champion, as he led the series at the time of curtailment.champion.

The series was won by Joshua Anderson.

== Entries ==
Entrant	Body Style	No.	Driver	Class	Rounds
Lichtenberger Motorsport	Nissan Altima	5	(Australia) Nicklaus Lichtenberger	R	1, 3–5, 7
Chivas Motorsport	Nissan Altima	6	(Australia) Ian Chivas	G	1
Muscle Motors Trimmers	Euro GT	7	(Australia) Andrew Lorgelly	M	1, 3-7
Constructa	Nissan Altima	8	(Australia) Laurie Fooks		1, 3
Shell Rimula Top Gun Race Team	Ford Mustang	9	(Australia) Ryan Reynolds	R	All
Shell Rimula Top Gun Race Team	Ford Mustang	18	(Australia) Cody Brewczynski	R	All
Supergroups	Chevrolet Camaro	11	(Australia) Leigh Bowler	G	2–7
Richardson Motorsport	Toyota Aurion	12	(Australia) Ayrton Richardson	R	2
Property Compliance Australia	Chevrolet Camaro	14	(Australia) Matt Gooding	R	All
Lustre Bar Melbourne	Chevrolet Camaro	15	(Australia) Adam Clark	M	1–4, 6-7
Osborn's Transport	Holden Cruze	16	(Australia) Joel Heinrich		3–7
Osborn's Transport	Chevrolet Camaro	86	(Australia) Brett Osborn		3–4, 6-7
Butler Fabrication	Euro GT	17	(Australia) Denis Butler	R	1, 4-7
K.E Motorsport	Ford Mustang	21	(Australia) Kyle Ensbey		2, 4
O'Keefe Motorsports	Nissan Altima	22	(Australia) Scott O'Keefe	M	1, 4, 7
Cooldrive Racing	Ford Mustang	25	(Australia) Reece Chapman		All
Cooldrive Racing	Ford Mustang	36	(Australia) Joshua Anderson		All
Norganic Proteins	Toyota Aurion	28	(Australia) Kent Quinn	M	2–7
Western Sydney Motorsport	Ford Mustang	30	(Australia) Tom Hayman	R	1–5
Western Sydney Motorsport	Ford Mustang	44	(Australia) John Steffensen	M	1–2, 4
Western Sydney Motorsport	Ford Mustang	64	(Australia) Craig Woods		1–2, 4
Western Sydney Motorsport	Ford Mustang	72	(Australia) Craig Thompson	G	1–2, 4
Western Sydney Motorsport	Ford Mustang	78	(Australia) Grant Thompson	M	1–4
Courtney Prince Motorsport	Ford Mustang	32	(Australia) Courtney Prince	W / R	All
Kody Garland Racing	Ford Mustang	41	(Australia) Kody Garland		1, 3–4, 6-7
Procool Racing	Chevrolet Camaro	47	(Australia) Troy Jones	M	1–7
FWG Concrete Wolf Pack Racing	Chevrolet Camaro	48	(Australia) Matt Forbes-Wilson		All
Bilstein	Chevrolet Camaro	67	(Australia) Rylan Gray	R	3, 5-7
Cody McKay Motorsports	Holden VY Commodore	82	(Australia) Cody McKay		All
Anthony Di Mauro Racing	Chevrolet Camaro	91	(Australia) Anthony Di Mauro	R	All
Aughtersons Insurance Brokers	Nissan Altima	96	(Australia) Jeff Watters	G	All
Tuggeranong Trans & Brake	Ford Coupe	99	(Australia) Mark Tarrant		3
Local Legends Racing	Euro GT	100	(Australia) Ryder Quinn	R	1, 3–7
Local Legends Racing	Euro GT	101	(United Kingdom) Tony Quinn	G	1, 4
Local Legends Racing	Euro GT	101	(New Zealand) Kaleb Ngatoa	R	2
Lachlan Ward Racing	Chevrolet Camaro	117	(Australia) Lachlan Ward	R	All

Symbol	Class
G	Gold
M	Masters
R	Rookie
W	Women's

== Calendar ==
Rd.	Circuit	City / State	Date	Round Winner
1	(New South Wales) Sydney Motorsport Park	Eastern Creek, New South Wales	4–6 March	(Australia) Tom Hayman
2	(Tasmania) Symmons Plains Raceway	Launceston, Tasmania	26–27 March	(Australia) Tom Hayman
3	(New South Wales) Wakefield Park	Goulburn, New South Wales	22–24 April	(Australia) Tom Hayman
4	(New South Wales) Mount Panorama Circuit	Bathurst, New South Wales	13–15 May	(Australia) Joshua Anderson
5	(Victoria (state)) Winton Motor Raceway	Winton, Victoria	20–22 May	(Australia) Cody Brewczynski
6	(South Australia) The Bend Motorsport Park	Tailem Bend, South Australia	29–31 July	(Australia) Kody Garland
7	(Victoria (state)) Sandown Raceway	Springvale, Victoria	19–21 August	(Australia) Joel Heinrich

== Results ==
=== Summary ===
Rd	Race	Circuit	Pole position	Fastest Lap	Winning driver	Winning team
1	1	(New South Wales) Sydney Motorsport Park	(Australia) Cody Brewczynski	(Australia) Kody Garland	(Australia) Cody Brewczynski	Shell Rimula Topgun Race Team
1	2	(New South Wales) Sydney Motorsport Park	(Australia) Cody Brewczynski	(Australia) Tom Hayman	(Australia) Tom Hayman	Western Sydney Motorsport
1	3	(New South Wales) Sydney Motorsport Park	(Australia) Cody Brewczynski	(Australia) Tom Hayman	(Australia) Tom Hayman	Western Sydney Motorsport
1	4	(New South Wales) Sydney Motorsport Park	(Australia) Cody Brewczynski	(Australia) Tom Hayman	(Australia) Cody Brewczynski	Shell Rimula Topgun Race Team
2	1	(Tasmania) Symmons Plains Raceway	(Australia) Joshua Anderson	(Australia) Cody Brewczynski	(Australia) Joshua Anderson	CoolDrive Racing
2	2	(Tasmania) Symmons Plains Raceway	(Australia) Joshua Anderson	(Australia) Tom Hayman	(Australia) Tom Hayman	Western Sydney Motorsport
2	3	(Tasmania) Symmons Plains Raceway	(Australia) Joshua Anderson	(Australia) Tom Hayman	(Australia) Tom Hayman	Western Sydney Motorsport
2	4	(Tasmania) Symmons Plains Raceway	(Australia) Joshua Anderson	(Australia) Tom Hayman	(Australia) Tom Hayman	Western Sydney Motorsport
3	1	(New South Wales) Wakefield Park	(Australia) Tom Hayman	(Australia) Kody Garland	(Australia) Tom Hayman	Western Sydney Motorsport
3	2	(New South Wales) Wakefield Park	(Australia) Tom Hayman	(Australia) Lachlan Ward	(Australia) Tom Hayman	Western Sydney Motorsport
3	3	(New South Wales) Wakefield Park	(Australia) Tom Hayman	(Australia) Tom Hayman	(Australia) Kody Garland	Kody Garland Racing
3	4	(New South Wales) Wakefield Park	(Australia) Tom Hayman	(Australia) Joel Heinrich	(Australia) Tom Hayman	Western Sydney Motorsport
4	1	(New South Wales) Mount Panorama Circuit	(Australia) Joel Heinrich	(Australia) Joshua Anderson	(Australia) Joel Heinrich	Osborn's Transport
4	2	(New South Wales) Mount Panorama Circuit	(Australia) Joel Heinrich	(Australia) Joshua Anderson	(Australia) Joshua Anderson	CoolDrive Racing
4	3	(New South Wales) Mount Panorama Circuit	(Australia) Joel Heinrich	(Australia) Joshua Anderson	(Australia) Joshua Anderson	CoolDrive Racing
5	1	(Victoria (state)) Winton Motor Raceway	(Australia) Joel Heinrich	(Australia) Joel Heinrich	(Australia) Joel Heinrich	Osborn's Transport
5	2	(Victoria (state)) Winton Motor Raceway	(Australia) Joel Heinrich	(Australia) Tom Hayman	(Australia) Tom Hayman	Western Sydney Motorsport
5	3	(Victoria (state)) Winton Motor Raceway	(Australia) Joel Heinrich	(Australia) Joel Heinrich	(Australia) Cody Brewczynski	Shell Rimula Topgun Race Team
5	4	(Victoria (state)) Winton Motor Raceway	(Australia) Joel Heinrich	(Australia) Tom Hayman	(Australia) Tom Hayman	Western Sydney Motorsport
6	1	(South Australia) The Bend Motorsport Park	(Australia) Joshua Anderson	(Australia) Joshua Anderson	(Australia) Joshua Anderson	CoolDrive Racing
6	2	(South Australia) The Bend Motorsport Park	(Australia) Joshua Anderson	(Australia) Ryan Reynolds	(Australia) Kody Garland	Kody Garland Racing
6	3	(South Australia) The Bend Motorsport Park	(Australia) Joshua Anderson	(Australia) Joshua Anderson	(Australia) Ryan Reynolds	Shell Rimula Topgun Race Team
6	4	(South Australia) The Bend Motorsport Park	(Australia) Joshua Anderson	(Australia) Joshua Anderson	(Australia) Kody Garland	Kody Garland Racing
7	1	(Victoria (state)) Sandown Raceway	(Australia) Joel Heinrich	(Australia) Kody Garland	(Australia) Joel Heinrich	Osborn's Transport
7	2	(Victoria (state)) Sandown Raceway	(Australia) Joel Heinrich	(Australia) Cody Brewczynski	(Australia) Ryan Reynolds	Shell Rimula Topgun Race Team
7	3	(Victoria (state)) Sandown Raceway	(Australia) Joel Heinrich	(Australia) Joshua Anderson	(Australia) Kody Garland	Kody Garland Racing
7	4	(Victoria (state)) Sandown Raceway	(Australia) Joel Heinrich	(Australia) Cody Brewczynski	(Australia) Cody Brewczynski	Shell Rimula Topgun Race Team

=== Points System ===
Points Format	Position																													
Points Format	1st	2nd	3rd	4th	5th	6th	7th	8th	9th	10th	11th	12th	13th	14th	15th	16th	17th	18th	19th	20th	21st	22nd	23rd	24th	25th	26th	27th	28th	29th	30th
Championship	51	50	49	48	47	46	45	44	43	42	41	40	39	38	37	36	35	34	33	32	31	30	29	28	27	26	25	24	23	22
Class	25	20	13	12	11	10	9	8	7	6	5	4	3	2	1															

- Championship: Championship Points based on Round Position.
- Class: Class Points based on Round Position in class.

=== Points Table ===
==== Drivers' Championship ====
Pos.	Driver Name	No.	SYD (New South Wales)	SYM (Tasmania)	WAK (New South Wales)	BAT (New South Wales)	WIN (Victoria (state))	BEN (South Australia)	SAN (Victoria (state))	Pen	Points
1	(Australia) Joshua Anderson	36	11	**2**	2	1	5	**2**	4	0	337
2	(Australia) Lachlan Ward	117	10	4	3	3	3	3	7	0	331
3	(Australia) Reece Chapman	25	5	3	5	2	8	7	10	0	324
4	(Australia) Courtney Price	32	8	9	8	6	6	5	9	0	313
5	(Australia) Anthony Di Mauro	91	9	8	7	11	10	13	8	0	298
6	(Australia) Ryan Reynolds	9	4	16	6	27	9	4	5	0	293
7	(Australia) Cody Brewczynski	18	**2**	21	25	19	1	11	2	0	284
8	(Australia) Matt Gooding	14	13	10	16	15	16	19	11	0	264
9	(Australia) Cody McKay	82	15	14	13	16	13	14	23	0	256
10	(Australia) Ryder Quinn	100	6	DNS	15	9	17	8	6	0	251
11	(Australia) Troy Jones	47	19	11	18	21	12	20	18	0	246
12	(Australia) Leigh Bowler	11	DNS	7	12	5	14	18	12	0	244
13	(Australia) Kody Garland	41	3	DNS	4	17	DNS	1	3	0	232
14	(Australia) Adam Clark	15	14	12	17	7	DNS	16	16	0	227
15	(Australia) Jeff Watters	96	23	15	20	25	15	21	22	0	223
16	(Australia) Joel Heinrich	16	DNS	DNS	10	**13**	**4**	9	**1**	0	223
17	(Australia) Kent Quinn	28	DNS	13	14	20	18	15	15	0	216
18	(Australia) Tom Hayman	30	1	1	**1**	DSQ	2	DNS	DNS	0	203
19	(Australia) Matt Forbes–Wilson	48	27	20	24	29	21	24	26	0	193
20	(Australia) Nicklaus Lichtenberger	5	12	DNS	11	12	11	DNS	21	0	193
21	(Australia) Andrew Lorgelly	7	24	DNS	21	24	19	23	24	0	177
22	(Australia) Rylan Gray	67	DNS	DNS	9	DNS	7	12	20	0	160
23	(Australia) Grant Thompson	78	22	17	22	23	22	DNS	DNS	0	154
24	(Australia) Brett Osborn	86	DNS	DNS	19	10	DNS	10	17	0	152
25	(Australia) Denis Butler	17	14	DNS	DNS	26	20	DNS	19	0	129
26	(Australia) Craig Thompson	72	16	6	DNS	28	DNS	DNS	DNS	0	106
27	(Australia) Scott O'Keefe	22	18	DNS	DNS	22	DNS	DNS	14	0	102
28	(Australia) Craig Woods	64	7	19	DNS	4	DNS	DNS	DNS	0	93
29	(Australia) Kyle Ensbey	21	DNS	5	DNS	8	DNS	DNS	DNS	0	91
30	(Australia) Jack Boyd	38	DNS	DNS	DNS	DNS	DNS	6	13	0	85
31	(United Kingdom) Tony Quinn	101	20	DNS	DNS	18	DNS	DNS	DNS	0	65
32	(Australia) John Steffensen	44	25	DNS	DNS	14	DNS	DNS	DNS	0	65
33	(Australia) Mark Rosser	56	DNS	DNS	DNS	DNS	DNS	17	DNS	0	35
34	(Australia) Aryton Richardson	12	DNS	18	DNS	DNS	DNS	DNS	DNS	0	34
35	(New Zealand) Kaleb Ngatoa	100	DNS	19	DNS	DNS	DNS	DNS	DNS	0	33
36	(Australia) Laurie Fooks	8	21	DNS	DNS	DNS	DNS	DNS	DNS	0	31
37	(Australia) Mark Griffith	19	DNS	DNS	DNS	DNS	DNS	22	DNS	0	30
38	(Australia) Mark Tarrant	99	DNS	DNS	23	DNS	DNS	DNS	DNS	0	29
39	(Australia) Nathan Locke	27	DNS	DNS	DNS	DNS	DNS	DNS	25	0	27
40	(Australia) Ian Chivas	6	26	DNS	DNS	DNS	DNS	DNS	DNS	0	26
41	(Australia) Shane Burns	10	DNS	DNS	DNS	DNS	DNS	DNS	27	0	25
Pos.	Driver Name	No.	SYD (New South Wales)	SYM (Tasmania)	WAK (New South Wales)	BAT (New South Wales)	WIN (Victoria (state))	BEN (South Australia)	SAN (Victoria (state))	Pen	Points

Key
Colour	Result
Gold	Winner
Silver	Second place
Bronze	Third place
Green	Other points position
Blue	Other classified position
Blue	Not classified, finished (NC)
Purple	Not classified, retired (Ret)
Red	Did not qualify (DNQ)
Red	Did not pre-qualify (DNPQ)
Black	Disqualified (DSQ)
White	Did not start (DNS)
White	Race cancelled (C)
Blank	Did not practice (DNP)
Blank	Excluded (EX)
Blank	Did not arrive (DNA)
Blank	Withdrawn (WD)
Blank	Did not enter (cell empty)
Text formatting	Meaning
**Bold**	Pole position
Italics	Fastest lap

==== Rookie Championship ====
Pos.	Driver Name	No.	SYD (New South Wales)	SYM (Tasmania)	WAK (New South Wales)	BAT (New South Wales)	WIN (Victoria (state))	BEN (South Australia)	SAN (Victoria (state))	Pen	Points
1	(Australia) Lachlan Ward	117	6	1	1	1	2	1	4	0	143
2	(Australia) Ryan Reynolds	9	2	5	2	11	5	2	2	0	107
3	(Australia) Cody Brewczynski	18	1	8	11	8	1	7	1	0	105
4	(Australia) Courtney Price	32	4	3	4	2	3	3	6	0	104
5	(Australia) Anthony Di Mauro	91	5	2	3	5	6	9	5	0	86
6	(Australia) Ryder Quinn	91	9	DNS	7	3	9	5	3	0	75
7	(Australia) Matt Gooding	14	8	4	8	7	8	10	7	0	60
8	(Australia) Nicklaus Lichtenberger	5	7	DNS	6	6	7	DNS	12	0	42
9	(Australia) Rylan Gray	67	DNS	DNS	5	DNS	4	8	11	0	37
10	(Australia) Brett Osborn	86	DNS	DNS	9	4	DNS	6	9	0	37
11	(Australia) Andrew Lorgelly	7	10	DNS	10	9	10	11	13	0	31
12	(Australia) Denis Butler	17	9	DNS	DNS	10	11	DNS	10	0	24
13	(Australia) Jack Boyd	38	DNS	DNS	DNS	DNS	DNS	4	8	0	21
14	(Australia) Aryton Richardson	12	DNS	6	DNS	DNS	DNS	DNS	DNS	0	10
15	(New Zealand) Kaleb Ngatoa	100	DNS	7	DNS	DNS	DNS	DNS	DNS	0	9
16	(Australia) Laurie Fooks	8	11	DNS	DNS	DNS	DNS	DNS	DNS	0	6
17	(Australia) Mark Rosser	56	DNS	DNS	DNS	DNS	DNS	12	DNS	0	6
18	(Australia) Nathan Locke	27	DNS	DNS	DNS	DNS	DNS	DNS	14	0	2
Pos.	Driver Name	No.	SYD (New South Wales)	SYM (Tasmania)	WAK (New South Wales)	BAT (New South Wales)	WIN (Victoria (state))	BEN (South Australia)	SAN (Victoria (state))	Pen	Points

Key
Colour	Result
Gold	Winner
Silver	Second place
Bronze	Third place
Green	Other points position
Blue	Other classified position
Blue	Not classified, finished (NC)
Purple	Not classified, retired (Ret)
Red	Did not qualify (DNQ)
Red	Did not pre-qualify (DNPQ)
Black	Disqualified (DSQ)
White	Did not start (DNS)
White	Race cancelled (C)
Blank	Did not practice (DNP)
Blank	Excluded (EX)
Blank	Did not arrive (DNA)
Blank	Withdrawn (WD)
Blank	Did not enter (cell empty)
Text formatting	Meaning
**Bold**	Pole position
Italics	Fastest lap
