= 2021 Aussie Racing Car Series =

Motor racing competition

The 2021 Battery World Aussie Racing Car Series was an Australian motor racing series open to Aussie Racing Cars.

The Championship was cancelled after three rounds and there was no official Driver's Champion. Kody Garland led the series points at the time of cancellation.

== Entries ==
| Manufacturer | Model | Entrant | No. | Driver Name | Class | Rounds |
|---|---|---|---|---|---|---|
| ARC | Euro GT | Lorgelly Racing | 7 | (Australia) Andrew Lorgelly | M / R | All |
| ARC | Euro GT | Team Grand Racing | 17 | (Australia) Dennis Butler | G / R | All |
| ARC | Euro GT | Griffith Corporation | 19 | (Australia) Mark Griffith | G | 1 |
| ARC | Euro GT | PT Painting | 46 | (Australia) Pawel Faber | M | 1, 3 |
| ARC | Euro GT | Local Legends Racing | 100 | (Australia) Ryder Quinn | R | 2–3 |
| ARC | Euro GT | Local Legends Racing | 101 | (United Kingdom) Tony Quinn | G | 2–3 |
| Chevrolet | Camaro | | 3 | (Australia) Keelan Dunston | R | 1 |
| Chevrolet | Camaro | Simmons Civil Contracting | 9 | (Australia) Nick Simmons | C | All |
| Chevrolet | Camaro | Supergroups Complex Constructions | 11 | (Australia) Leigh Bowler | G | All |
| Chevrolet | Camaro | Lustre Bar Melbourne | 15 | (Australia) Adam Clark | M | All |
| Chevrolet | Camaro | Castrol Racing | 25 | (Australia) Reece Chapman | C | All |
| Chevrolet | Camaro | Perneso / RDA Brakes | 36 | (Australia) Joshua Anderson | C | All |
| Chevrolet | Camaro | Procool Racing | 47 | (Australia) Troy Jones | M | 1–2 |
| Chevrolet | Camaro | FWG Concrete | 48 | (Australia) Matt Forbes-Wilson | C | All |
| Chevrolet | Camaro | Nina Rose Motorsport | 56 | (Australia) Callum Bishop | R | 2 |
| Chevrolet | Camaro | Osborn's Transport | 86 | (Australia) Brett Osborn | M / R | 3 |
| Ford | Mustang | K.E Motorsport | 21 | (Australia) Kyle Ensbey | C | 1, 3 |
| Ford | Mustang | K.E Motorsport | 22 | (Australia) Matt Nolan | C | 1, 3 |
| Ford | Mustang | Western Sydney Motorsport | 30 | (Australia) Tom Hayman | R | All |
| Ford | Mustang | Western Sydney Motorsport | 44 | (Australia) John Steffensen | M / R | 1–2 |
| Ford | Mustang | Western Sydney Motorsport | 64 | (Australia) Craig Woods | C | All |
| Ford | Mustang | Western Sydney Motorsport | 72 | (Australia) Craig Thompson | G | All |
| Ford | Mustang | Western Sydney Motorsport | 78 | (Australia) Grant Thompson | M | All |
| Ford | Mustang | Prince Excavations | 32 | (Australia) Courtney Prince | W / R | 1–2 |
| Ford | Mustang | Kody Garland Racing | 41 | (Australia) Kody Garland | C | All |
| Ford | Mustang | Gencom Wireless Solutions | 52 | (Australia) Charlotte Poynting | W | All |
| Ford | Mustang | Wilcox Engineering and Screwing Conveyor | 86 | (Australia) Ben Wilcox | C | 1 |
| Ford | Mustang | McKittrick Racing | 88 | (Australia) Matthew McKittrick | G | 1–2 |
| Ford | Mustang | Local Legends Racing | 100 | (United Kingdom) Tony Quinn | G | 1 |
| Holden | Commodore | Spray Booths Services Australasia | 77 | (Australia) Sam Chester | G | 3 |
| Holden | Commodore | Matt Thewlis Racing | 79 | (Australia) Matt Thewlis | C | 2 |
| Holden | Commodore | Cody McKay Motorsports | 82 | (Australia) Cody McKay | R | All |
| Holden | Cruze | Osborn's Transport | 16 | (Australia) Joel Heinrich | C | All |
| Nissan | Altima L33 | Diamond Mechanical and Auto Electrical | 5 | (Australia) Nicklaus Lichtenberger | R | 1, 3 |
| Nissan | Altima L33 | Skilgate Group | 6 | (Australia) Ian Chivas | G | 1, 3 |
| Nissan | Altima L33 | Multi Service Solutions | 22 | (Australia) Scott O'Keefe | M | 3 |
| Nissan | Altima L33 | Aughtersons Insurance Brokers | 96 | (Australia) Jeff Watters | G | All |
| Toyota | Aurion | Aussie Racing Cars | 2 | (Australia) Phil Ward | G | 1, 3 |
| Toyota | Aurion | Valvoline Gowans Racing | 2 | (Australia) Adam Gowans | C | 2 |
| Toyota | Aurion | Norganic Proteins | 28 | (Australia) Kent Quinn | M | All |

| Symbol | Class |
|---|---|
| C | Championship |
| G | Gold |
| M | Masters |
| R | Rookie |
| W | Women's |
