= George Miedecke =

Australian racing driver

- Born: George Brunton Miedecke; January 16, 1986 (age 40); Port Macquarie, New South Wales

ARCA Menards Series career
- 1 race run over 1 year
- Best finish: 84th (2011)
- First race: 2011 Modspace 150 (Milville)
Wins	Top tens	Poles
0	1	0
- Statistics up to date as of February 5, 2025.

George Brunton Miedecke (born January 16, 1986) is an Australian professional auto racing driver who has previously competed in the ARCA Racing Series and the Dunlop V8 Supercar Series . He is the son of former racing driver Andrew Miedecke, who is the owner and current team principal of Miedecke Motorsport.

Miedecke has previously competed in series such as the UARA STARS Late Model Series, the TA2 Muscle Car Series Northern Series, the GT4 Australia Series, and the V8 Ute Racing Series.

== Motorsports results ==
=== ARCA Racing Series ===
(key) (Bold – Pole position awarded by qualifying time. Italics – Pole position earned by points standings or practice time. * – Most laps led.)

ARCA Racing Series results
Year	Team	No.	Make	1	2	3	4	5	6	7	8	9	10	11	12	13	14	15	16	17	18	19	ARSC	Pts	Ref
2011	Venturini Motorsports	25	Toyota	DAY	TAL	SLM	TOL	NJE; 2*	CHI	POC	MCH	WIN	BLN	IOW	IRP	POC	ISF	MAD	DSF	SLM	KAN	TOL	84th	235	
