= McLaren M630 engine =

Overview
- Manufacturer: McLaren
- Designer: Richard Jackson
- Production: 2021–present

Layout
- Configuration: 120° V6
- Displacement: 2,993 cc (183 cu in)
- Cylinder bore: 84 mm (3.3 in)
- Piston stroke: 90 mm (3.5 in)

RPM range
- Max. engine speed: 8,500 RPM

Combustion
- Turbocharger: Twin-turbocharged
- Fuel system: Direct injection
- Fuel type: Unleaded petrol + Ethanol (both blends may vary) by Gulf Pro/Endurance Fuels
- Oil system: Dry sump. Gulf Formula Elite 5W-40 fully-synthetic motor oil
- Cooling system: Water-cooled

Output
- Power output: 577 hp (430 kW; 585 PS)
- Torque output: 431 lb⋅ft (584 N⋅m)

The McLaren M630 engine is a 3.0-litre, 120-degree, twin-turbocharged V6 engine, designed and developed for use in the Artura sportscar by McLaren Automotive.

== Electric motor ==
The electric motor used in conjunction with the M630 combustion engine produces 95 PS (94 hp; 70 kW) and 225 N⋅m (166 ft⋅lb) of torque. The combined torque peak is less than the sum of both sides as the output is limited to "optimize powertrain drivability characteristics." The 7.4-kWh lithium-ion battery pack weighs 88 kg (194 lb) and is positioned under the rear of the passenger compartment. McLaren claims a 2.5-hour charge time for an 80 percent charge using an EVSE cable and a 19-mile electric range under European testing methodology. This motor replaces the reverse gear, similar to the Ferrari SF90 Stradale. The total mass of all electrical components is 130 kg (287 lb), which means that the Artura has a kerb weight only 46 kg (102 lb) more than that of its predecessor, the McLaren 570S. The Artura has a range of 19 miles (30.6 km) on electric-only mode.

== Engine ==
The M630 is an all-new 2,993 cc (3.0 L; 182.6 cu in) twin-turbocharged V6 engine paired with an electric motor to produce a combined output of 680 PS; 671 hp (500 kW) at 7,500 rpm and 720 N⋅m (531 lb⋅ft) of torque at 2,250 rpm. On its own, the internal combustion engine produces 585 PS; 577 hp (430 kW) and 584 N⋅m (431 lb⋅ft) of torque. The all-aluminum engine has a bank angle of 120 degrees, a world first for a production V6 engine. This is to accommodate a hot-vee layout, where the two turbochargers are placed in the vee of the engine. Power is sent to the rear wheels through an all-new 8 speed dual-clutch transmission. The redline is set at 8,500 rpm.

== Applications ==
- McLaren Artura
