= GT4 Australia Series =

The GT4 Australia Series (known commercially as Monochrome GT4 Australia Series for 2024–2025) is a motor racing series for SRO GT4-class grand touring cars. The series is promoted by the SRO Motorsports Group, who are the global owner of the category, and also promote the GT World Challenge Australia for SRO GT3 cars.

The first series ran in 2024, after GT4 cars had previously run in the Australian Production Car Championship. In 2024, the series ran as part of the SpeedSeries events promoted by Motorsport Australia. For 2025, SRO has taken over as event promoter and the series will run on events headlined by the World Challenge Australia.

== Cup winners ==
Like other series run by SRO, GT4 Australia awards multiple cups. Eligibility for the various cups is determined by the previous experience, age, and results achieved by the drivers.

Professional racing drivers with results in high-profile series (such as the Supercars Championship will have FIA Gold or FIA Platinum categorisation, and are only eligible to compete as part of the Pro-Am Cup, paired with a Bronze category driver.

Winners
Year	Silver Cup	Pro-Am Cup	Am Cup
2024	Method Motorsport (Marcos Flack/Tom Hayman) (McLaren Artura GT4)	Method Motorsport (Lachlan Mineeff/Shane Smollen) (Porsche 718 Cayman CS RS)	Randall Racing (John Bowe/Jacob Lawrence) (BMW M4 GT4 G82)
