= Reuben Goodall =

Australian racing driver (born 2003)

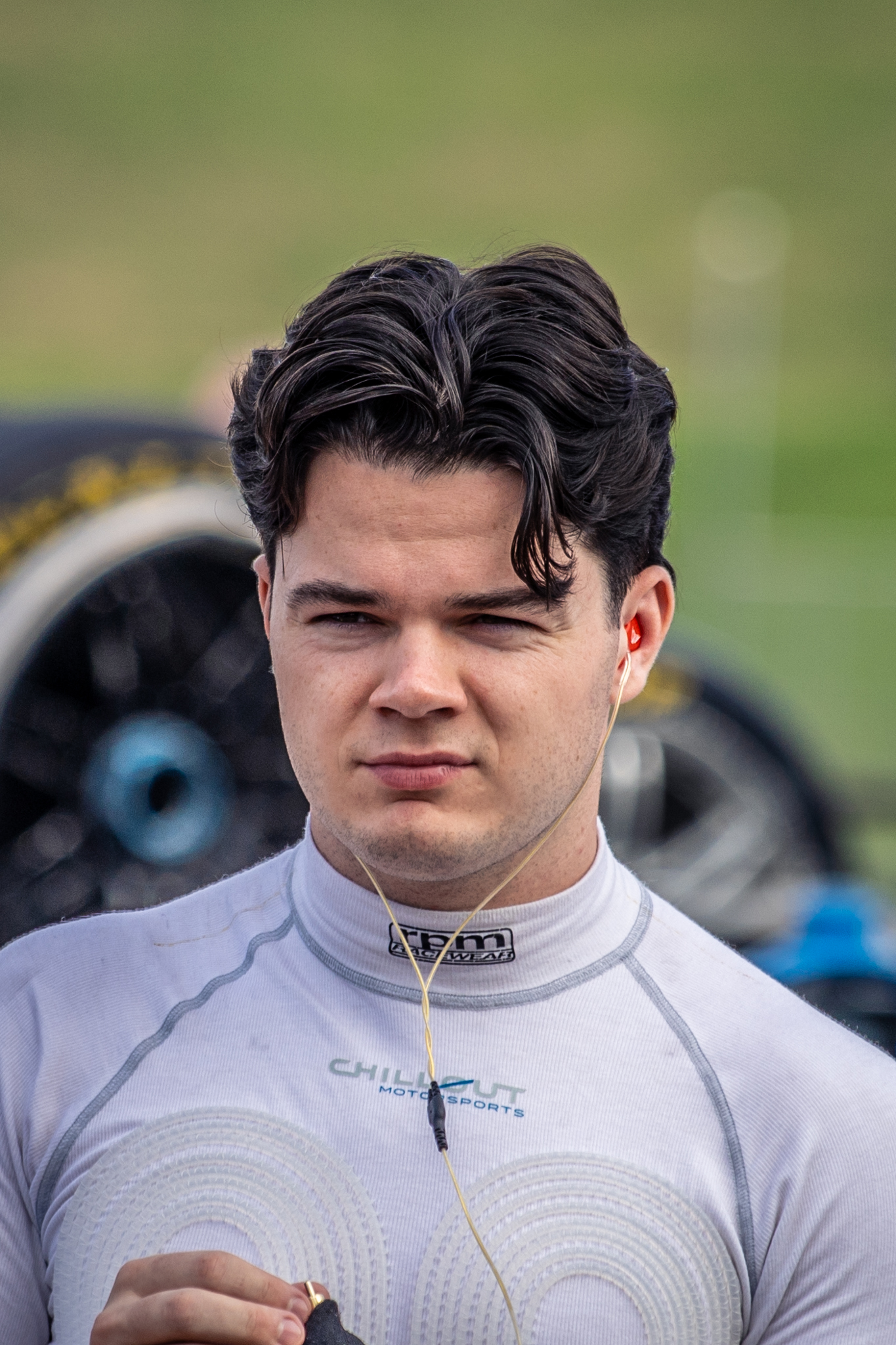
- Goodall in 2026
- Nationality: (Australia) Australian
- Born: Reuben Jakob Goodall; 20 November 2003 (age 22) Adelaide, South Australia, Australia

Super2 Series career
- Debut season: 2024
- Current team: Tickford Autosport
- Car number: 5
- Former teams: Gomersall Motorsport
- Starts: 26
- Wins: 0
- Podiums: 7
- Poles: 0
- Fastest laps: 1
- Best finish: 4th in 2025

Previous series
- 2022-2023: Toyota Gazoo Racing Australia 86 Series

Reuben Jakob Goodall (born 20 November 2003) is an Australian racing driver currently competing for Tickford Autosport in the Super2 Series.

== Career ==
Goodall began karting in 2015, competing until 2022. Racing in his native Australia, Goodall most notably finished second in the 2021 Australian Karting Championship standings in the TAG 125 class. In 2022, Goodall also made his debut in car racing, competing in the Toyota Gazoo Racing Australia 86 Series for Sieders Racing Team. In his first season in car racing, Goodall scored a lone podium at Sandown and ended the year 15th in points.

Remaining with Sieders Racing Team for his sophomore season in the Toyota Gazoo Racing Australia 86 Series, Goodall scored his first podium of the season at Townsville, before finishing second in all three races at Sandown en route to a fourth-place points finish. During 2023, Goodall also made a one-off appearance in the V8 SuperUtes series, in which he scored pole on debut at Adelaide.

In 2024, Goodall stepped up to the Super2 Series as he joined Gomersall Motorsport to make his series debut. In his maiden season in the series, Goodall took a best result of seventh at Bathurst, as he ended the year 15th in points after withdrawing from the season-ending round at Adelaide after crashing in qualifying.

Goodall returned to the Super2 Series in 2025, switching to Tickford Autosport for his sophomore season. Finishing 12th and sixth in the first round at Sydney, Goodall then took his maiden series podium at Symmons Plains in race one by finishing second, before finishing fourth in race two. In the following round at Townsville, Goodall finished second in both races, before finishing no higher than 10th in Queensland. Goodall then ended the season with two more podiums at Bathurst and Adelaide en route to a fourth-place points finish.

In late 2025, Tickford Autosport retained Goodall for the 2026 Super2 Series, as well as installing him as a co-driver to Thomas Randle for the endurance races in the Supercars Championship, as well as a wildcard appearance at the Townsville 500.

== Karting record ==
=== Karting career summary ===
Season	Series	Team	Position
2018	Australian Kart Championship – KA2		19th
2019	Australian Kart Championship – KA2		4th
2020	Australian Kart Championship – X30		NC
2021	Australian Kart Championship – TAG 125		2nd
2022	Australian Kart Championship – X30		30th

== Racing record ==
=== Racing career summary ===
Season	Series	Team	Races	Wins	Poles	F/Laps	Podiums	Points	Position
2022	Toyota Gazoo Racing Australia 86 Series	Sieders Racing Team	15	0	0	0	1	586	17th
2023	Toyota Gazoo Racing Australia 86 Series	Sieders Racing Team	14	0	0	0	4	1078	4th
2023	V8 SuperUtes Series – Go Sunny Tradies Cup	Sieders Racing Team	6	0	1	0	0	0	NC
2024	Super2 Series	Gomersall Motorsport	10	0	0	0	0	600	15th
2025	Super2 Series	Tickford Autosport	12	0	0	0	5	1197	4th
2026	Super2 Series	Tickford Autosport	6	1	0	2	3	702*	2nd*
2026	Supercars Championship	Tickford Racing							

=== Super2 Series results ===
(key) (Race results only)

Super2 Series results
Year	Team	No.	Car	1	2	3	4	5	6	7	8	9	10	11	12	Position	Points
2024	Gomersall Motorsport	20	Holden Commodore ZB	BAT1; R1; 12	BAT1; R2; 17	BAR; R3; 14	BAR; R4; 16	TOW; R5; 12	TOW; R6; 13	SAN; R7; 16	SAN; R8; Ret	BAT2; R9; 12	BAT2; R10; 7	ADE; R11; DNS	ADE; R12; DNS	15th	600
2025	Tickford Racing	5	Ford Mustang S550	SMP; R1; 12	SMP; R2; 6	SYM; R3; 2	SYM; R4; 5	TOW; R5; 2	TOW; R6; 2	QLD; R7; 17	QLD; R8; 10	BAT; R9; 3	BAT; R10; 5	ADE; R11; 3	ADE; R12; Ret	4th	1197
2026	Tickford Racing	5	Ford Mustang S550	SMP; R1; 2	SMP; R2; 4	HID; R3; 17	HID; R4; 3	BAR; R5; 5	BAR; R6; 1	BAT; R9	BAT; R10	SAN; R7	SAN; R8	ADE; R11	ADE; R12	2nd*	702*

=== Supercars Championship results ===
Supercars results
Year	Team	Car	1	2	3	4	5	6	7	8	9	10	11	12	13	14	15	16	17	18	19	20	21	22	23	24	25	26	27	28	29	30	31	32	33	34	35	36	37	Position	Points
2026	Tickford Racing	Ford Mustang S650	SMP; R1	SMP; R2	SMP; R3	MEL; R4	MEL; R5	MEL; R6	MEL; R7	TAU; R8	TAU; R9	CHR; R10	CHR; R11	CHR; R12	CHR; R13	SYM; R14	SYM; R15	SYM; R16	HID; R20	HID; R21	HID; R22	TOW; R23; 25	TOW; R24; 24	TOW; R25; 23	BAR; R17	BAR; R18	BAR; R19	QLD; R26	QLD; R27	QLD; R28	BEN; R28	BAT; R30	SUR; R31	SUR; R32	SAN; R33	SAN; R34	ADE; R35	ADE; R36	ADE; R37	27th*	44*
