= 2024 Super2 Series =

Australian motor racing competition

The 2024 Dunlop Super2 & Super3 Series was an Australian motor racing competition for Supercars as a support series. It was the twenty-fifth running of the Supercars Development Series, the second tier of competition in Supercars racing. Since joining as a class in 2021 this marked at the same time as the seventeenth and final running of the Super3 Series before being axed in 2025 due to low grid numbers, the third tier of competition in Supercars racing (Officially in 2019 as the Kumho Tyre Super3 Series).

== Calendar ==
| Round | Event | Circuit | Location | Dates | Map of circuit locations |
|---|---|---|---|---|---|
| 1 | Bathurst 500 | (New South Wales) Mount Panorama Circuit | Bathurst, New South Wales | 23–25 February | 2024 Super2 Series is located in Australia |
| 2 | Perth SuperSprint | (Western Australia) Wanneroo Raceway | Neerabup, Western Australia | 17–19 May | 2024 Super2 Series is located in Australia |
| 3 | Townsville 500 | (Queensland) Reid Park Street Circuit | Townsville, Queensland | 5–7 July | 2024 Super2 Series is located in Australia |
| 4 | Sandown 500 | (Victoria (state)) Sandown Raceway | Springvale, Victoria | 13–15 September | 2024 Super2 Series is located in Australia |
| 5 | Bathurst 1000 | (New South Wales) Mount Panorama Circuit | Bathurst, New South Wales | 10–13 October | 2024 Super2 Series is located in Australia |
| 6 | Adelaide 500 | (South Australia) Adelaide Street Circuit | Adelaide, South Australia | 14–17 November | 2024 Super2 Series is located in Australia |

=== Calendar changes ===
The Sandown 500 was originally set to be held on 22 September, but on 14 March, the event was moved forward a week to 15 September. This change has caused the Super2 event to also be moved forward a week.

== Entries ==
=== Classes ===
| Name | Regulation | Vehicles |
|---|---|---|
| Super2 | 2018 to 2022 Gen2 | Ford Mustang S550; Holden Commodore ZB |
| Super3 | 2013 to 2017 Car of the Future | Ford Falcon FG X Holden Commodore VF; Mercedes-AMG E63 W212; Nissan Altima L33; Volvo S60 Mk.2 |
| Super3 | 2003 to 2012 Project Blueprint | Ford Falcon FG; Holden Commodore VE |

=== Entry list ===
| Manufacturer | Model | Entrant | No. | Driver Name | Class | | Rounds |
| Manufacturer | Model | Entrant | No. | Driver Name | Car | Driver | Rounds |
|---|---|---|---|---|---|---|---|
| Ford | Falcon FG | Auddino Racing | 4 | (Australia) Tony Auddino | S3 | | 6 |
| Ford | Falcon FG | Image Racing | 49 | (Australia) Antonio Molluso | S3 | | 4 |
| Ford | Mustang S550 | Tickford Autosport | 5 | (Australia) Bradley Vaughan | S2 | | All |
| Ford | Mustang S550 | Tickford Autosport | 6 | (Australia) Lochie Dalton | S2 | | All |
| Ford | Mustang S550 | Tickford Autosport | 55 | (Australia) Rylan Gray | S2 | R | All |
| Ford | Mustang S550 | AIM Motorsport Australia | 11 | (Australia) Zane Morse | S2 | | 1, 3 |
| Ford | Mustang S550 | AIM Motorsport Australia | 11 | (Australia) Ryan Gilroy | S2 | R | 2 |
| Ford | Mustang S550 | AIM Motorsport Australia | 111 | (Australia) Dean Fiore | S2 | | 3 |
| Ford | Mustang S550 | AIM Motorsport Australia | 117/138 | (Australia) Jett Johnson | S2 | R | 1–2 |
| Ford | Mustang S550 | AIM Motorsport Australia | 219 | (Australia) James Masterton | S2 | | 1 |
| Ford | Mustang S550 | Anderson Motorsport | 17 | (Australia) Max Vidau | S2 | R | All |
| Ford | Mustang S550 | Kelly Racing | 22 | (Australia) Mason Kelly | S2 | R | All |
| Ford | Mustang S550 | Kelly Racing | 27 | (Australia) Aaron Cameron | S2 | | All |
| Ford | Mustang S550 | Blanchard Racing Team | 79 | (Australia) Jack Perkins | S2 | | 3–4 |
| Holden | Commodore VF | Auddino Racing | 4 | (Australia) Tony Auddino | S3 | | 2, 4 |
| Holden | Commodore VF | Image Racing | 999 | (Australia) Bailey Sweeny | S3 | | 5 |
| Holden | Commodore ZB | Eggleston Motorsport | 1 | (Australia) Kai Allen | S2 | | All |
| Holden | Commodore ZB | Eggleston Motorsport | 38 | (Australia) Cameron Crick | S2 | | 1–3 |
| Holden | Commodore ZB | Eggleston Motorsport | 54 | (Australia) Jordyn Sinni | S2 | | All |
| Holden | Commodore ZB | Eggleston Motorsport | 88 | (Australia) Cooper Murray | S2 | | 1–4 |
| Holden | Commodore ZB | Eggleston Motorsport | 88 | (Australia) Jonathon Webb | S2 | | 5 |
| Holden | Commodore ZB | Eggleston Motorsport | 88 | (Australia) Thomas Maxwell | S2 | | 6 |
| Holden | Commodore ZB | Walkinshaw Andretti United | 2 | (Australia) Campbell Logan | S2 | R | All |
| Holden | Commodore ZB | Walkinshaw Andretti United | 25 | (Australia) Zach Bates | S2 | | All |
| Holden | Commodore ZB | Brad Jones Racing | 9 | (Australia) Cody Gillis | S2 | R | All |
| Holden | Commodore ZB | Brad Jones Racing | 19 | (Australia) Elliott Cleary | S2 | R | All |
| Holden | Commodore ZB | Matt Chahda Motorsport | 18 | (Australia) Matt Chahda | S2 | | 1–3, 6 |
| Holden | Commodore ZB | Matt Chahda Motorsport | 37 | (Australia) Jackson Rice | S2 | R | 5 |
| Holden | Commodore ZB | Matt Chahda Motorsport | 116 | (Australia) Aron Shields | S2 | R | 4 |
| Holden | Commodore ZB | Gomersall Motorsport | 20 | (Australia) Reuben Goodall | S2 | R | All |
| Holden | Commodore ZB | Callum Walker Racing | 33 | (Australia) Callum Walker | S2 | | 1–4 |
| Holden | Commodore ZB | RM Racing Cars / PremiAir Racing | 92 | (Australia) Cameron McLeod | S2 | R | 1–4, 6 |
| Holden | Commodore ZB | Image Racing / Erebus Motorsport | 99 | (Australia) Jobe Stewart | S2 | R | All |
| Holden | Commodore ZB | Image Racing | 118 | (Australia) Jarrod Hughes | S2 | R | All |
| Nissan | Altima L33 | MW Motorsport | 3 | (Australia) Thomas Maxwell | S3 | R | 1–5 |
| Nissan | Altima L33 | MW Motorsport | 15 | (Australia) Cody Burcher | S3 | R | 1–5 |

| Icon | Class |
|---|---|
| S2 | Super2 (Gen2) |
| S3 | Super3 (Car of the Future) |
| S3 | Super3 (Project Blueprint) |
| R | Rookie Cup |

=== Teams Changes ===
==== Super2 ====
AIM Motorsport Australia expanded to a two car team after purchasing another ex-Tickford Racing Ford Mustang GT from MW Motorsport. After a myriad of issues throughout the season, the team decided to withdraw from the series.

=== Drivers Changes ===
==== Super2 ====
Lochie Dalton switched from Brad Jones Racing to Tickford Racing.

Max Vidau graduated from the Porsche Carrera Cup Australia to join Anderson Motorsport.

Cody Burcher, Jarrod Hughes, Reuben Goodall and Campbell Logan graduated from the Toyota 86 Racing Series to join MW Motorsport, Image Racing, Gomersall Motorsport and Walkinshaw Andretti United respectively.

Reuben Goodall graduated from the SuperUtes Series to join Gomersall Motorsport

== Results and standings ==
=== Season summary ===
==== Super2 Series ====
| Round | Event | Pole position | Fastest lap | Winning driver | Winning team | Winning Car | Round Winner |
|---|---|---|---|---|---|---|---|
| 1 | (New South Wales) Bathurst 500 | (Australia) Cooper Murray | (Australia) Kai Allen | (Australia) Kai Allen | Eggleston Motorsport | Holden Commodore ZB | (Australia) Kai Allen |
| 1 | (New South Wales) Bathurst 500 | (Australia) Kai Allen | (Australia) Kai Allen | (Australia) Kai Allen | Eggleston Motorsport | Holden Commodore ZB | (Australia) Kai Allen |
| 2 | (Western Australia) Perth SuperSprint | (Australia) Cooper Murray | (Australia) Kai Allen | (Australia) Kai Allen | Eggleston Motorsport | Holden Commodore ZB | (Australia) Zach Bates |
| 2 | (Western Australia) Perth SuperSprint | (Australia) Brad Vaughan | (Australia) Zach Bates | (Australia) Zach Bates | Walkinshaw Andretti United | Holden Commodore ZB | (Australia) Zach Bates |
| 3 | (Queensland) Townsville 500 | (Australia) Jack Perkins | (Australia) Rylan Gray | (Australia) Jack Perkins | Blanchard Racing Team | Ford Mustang S550 | (Australia) Jack Perkins |
| 3 | (Queensland) Townsville 500 | (Australia) Zach Bates | (Australia) Zach Bates | (Australia) Kai Allen | Eggleston Motorsport | Holden Commodore ZB | (Australia) Jack Perkins |
| 4 | (Victoria (state)) Sandown 500 | (Australia) Jack Perkins | (Australia) Jack Perkins | (Australia) Jack Perkins | Blanchard Racing Team | Ford Mustang S550 | (Australia) Zach Bates |
| 4 | (Victoria (state)) Sandown 500 | (Australia) Jarrod Hughes | (Australia) Cooper Murray | (Australia) Brad Vaughan | Tickford Autosport | Ford Mustang S550 | (Australia) Zach Bates |
| 5 | (New South Wales) Bathurst 1000 | (Australia) Brad Vaughan | (Australia) Zach Bates | (Australia) Jobe Stewart | Image Racing / Erebus Motorsport | Holden Commodore ZB | (Australia) Rylan Gray |
| 5 | (New South Wales) Bathurst 1000 | (Australia) Aaron Cameron | (Australia) Aaron Cameron | (Australia) Aaron Cameron | Kelly Racing | Ford Mustang S550 | (Australia) Rylan Gray |
| 6 | (South Australia) Adelaide 500 | (Australia) Zach Bates | (Australia) Aaron Cameron | (Australia) Aaron Cameron | Kelly Racing | Ford Mustang S550 | (Australia) Zach Bates |
| 6 | (South Australia) Adelaide 500 | (Australia) Aaron Cameron | (Australia) Kai Allen | (Australia) Zach Bates | Walkinshaw Andretti United | Holden Commodore ZB | (Australia) Zach Bates |

==== Super3 Series ====
| Round | Event | Pole position | Fastest lap | Winning driver | Winning team | Winning manufacturer | Round Winner |
|---|---|---|---|---|---|---|---|
| 1 | (New South Wales) Bathurst 500 | (Australia) Cody Burcher | (Australia) Cody Burcher | (Australia) Cody Burcher | MW Motorsport | Nissan Altima L33 | (Australia) Cody Burcher |
| 1 | (New South Wales) Bathurst 500 | (Australia) Cody Burcher | (Australia) Thomas Maxwell | (Australia) Cody Burcher | MW Motorsport | Nissan Altima L33 | (Australia) Cody Burcher |
| 2 | (Western Australia) Perth SuperSprint | (Australia) Thomas Maxwell | (Australia) Thomas Maxwell | (Australia) Cody Burcher | MW Motorsport | Nissan Altima L33 | (Australia) Cody Burcher |
| 2 | (Western Australia) Perth SuperSprint | (Australia) Cody Burcher | (Australia) Cody Burcher | (Australia) Cody Burcher | MW Motorsport | Nissan Altima L33 | (Australia) Cody Burcher |
| 3 | (Queensland) Townsville 500 | (Australia) Cody Burcher | (Australia) Cody Burcher | (Australia) Cody Burcher | MW Motorsport | Nissan Altima L33 | (Australia) Thomas Maxwell |
| 3 | (Queensland) Townsville 500 | (Australia) Cody Burcher | (Australia) Thomas Maxwell | (Australia) Thomas Maxwell | MW Motorsport | Nissan Altima L33 | (Australia) Thomas Maxwell |
| 4 | (Victoria (state)) Sandown 500 | (Australia) Cody Burcher | (Australia) Cody Burcher | (Australia) Cody Burcher | MW Motorsport | Nissan Altima L33 | (Australia) Tony Auddino |
| 4 | (Victoria (state)) Sandown 500 | (Australia) Cody Burcher | (Australia) Cody Burcher | (Australia) Tony Auddino | Auddino Racing | Holden Commodore VF | (Australia) Tony Auddino |
| 5 | (New South Wales) Bathurst 1000 | (Australia) Thomas Maxwell | (Australia) Thomas Maxwell | (Australia) Cody Burcher | MW Motorsport | Nissan Altima L33 | (Australia) Cody Burcher |
| 5 | (New South Wales) Bathurst 1000 | (Australia) Cody Burcher | (Australia) Cody Burcher | (Australia) Cody Burcher | MW Motorsport | Nissan Altima L33 | (Australia) Cody Burcher |
| 6 | (South Australia) Adelaide 500 | No starters | No starters | No starters | No starters | No starters | No starters |
| 6 | (South Australia) Adelaide 500 | No starters | No starters | No starters | No starters | No starters | No starters |

=== Series standings ===
==== Points system ====
Points were awarded for each race at an event, to the driver of a car that completed at least 75% of the race distance and was running at the completion of the race. At least 50% of the planned race distance must be completed for the result to be valid and championship points awarded. The following points scales apply to both the Super2 and Super3 Series.

Position
| 1st | 2nd | 3rd | 4th | 5th | 6th | 7th | 8th | 9th | 10th | 11th | 12th | 13th | 14th | 15th | 16th | 17th | 18th | 19th | 20th | 21st | 22nd | 23rd | 24th | 25th | 26th | 27th | 28th | 29th | 30th |
|---|---|---|---|---|---|---|---|---|---|---|---|---|---|---|---|---|---|---|---|---|---|---|---|---|---|---|---|---|---|
| 150 | 138 | 129 | 120 | 111 | 102 | 96 | 90 | 84 | 78 | 72 | 69 | 66 | 63 | 60 | 57 | 54 | 51 | 48 | 45 | 42 | 39 | 36 | 33 | 30 | 27 | 24 | 21 | 18 | 15 |

==== Super2 Series ====
| Pos. | Driver | No. | BAT1 (New South Wales) | | BAR (Western Australia) | | TOW (Queensland) | | SAN (Victoria (state)) | | BAT2 (New South Wales) | | ADE (South Australia) | | Pen. | Points |
|---|---|---|---|---|---|---|---|---|---|---|---|---|---|---|---|---|
| 1 | (Australia) Zach Bates | 25 | 3 | 19 | 3 | 1 | 17 | **2** | 3 | 3 | 5 | 4 | **2** | 1 | 0 | 1425 |
| 2 | (Australia) Aaron Cameron | 27 | 2 | 4 | 5 | 5 | 2 | 12 | 5 | 8 | 15 | **1** | 1 | **5** | 0 | 1359 |
| 3 | (Australia) Kai Allen | 1 | 1 | **1** | 1 | 8 | 5 | 1 | 4 | 5 | 14 | Ret | 7 | 2 | 0 | 1329 |
| 4 | (Australia) Jarrod Hughes | 118 | 5 | 9 | 7 | 18 | 6 | 10 | 6 | **11** | 4 | 5 | 4 | 4 | 0 | 1167 |
| 5 | (Australia) Jobe Stewart | 99 | 17 | 2 | 12 | 7 | 14 | 21 | 2 | 4 | 1 | Ret | 6 | 3 | 0 | 1101 |
| 6 | (Australia) Max Vidau | 17 | 10 | 7 | 11 | 2 | 3 | 9 | 9 | 13 | 2 | 6 | Ret | 9 | 0 | 1071 |
| 7 | (Australia) Rylan Gray | 55 | 4 | 6 | 18 | Ret | 4 | 15 | 14 | 16 | 3 | 3 | 5 | 6 | 0 | 1044 |
| 8 | (Australia) Brad Vaughan | 5 | 6 | 3 | NC | **4** | Ret | 16 | 10 | 1 | **6** | 2 | 14 | 7 | 0 | 1015 |
| 9 | (Australia) Lochie Dalton | 6 | 7 | 5 | 10 | 14 | 9 | 11 | 15 | 10 | 8 | 11 | 10 | 10 | 0 | 870 |
| 10 | (Australia) Jordyn Sinni | 54 | 11 | 12 | 6 | 6 | Ret | 8 | 7 | 7 | 9 | 14 | 8 | Ret | 0 | 864 |
| 11 | (Australia) Cameron McLeod | 92 | 13 | 8 | 8 | 3 | Ret | 5 | 18 | 17 | | | 3 | 8 | 0 | 810 |
| 12 | (Australia) Campbell Logan | 2 | 15 | Ret | 16 | 17 | Ret | 4 | 8 | 9 | 7 | 9 | 9 | 13 | 0 | 795 |
| 13 | (Australia) Cody Gillis | 9 | 19 | 13 | 4 | 10 | 13 | 20 | Ret | 14 | 11 | 8 | 12 | 12 | 0 | 786 |
| 14 | (Australia) Elliott Cleary | 19 | 20 | 14 | 13 | 15 | 11 | 19 | 11 | 19 | 13 | 12 | 13 | 14 | 0 | 738 |
| 15 | (Australia) Reuben Goodall | 20 | 12 | 17 | 14 | 16 | 12 | 13 | 16 | Ret | 12 | 7 | DNS | DNS | 0 | 600 |
| 16 | (Australia) Jack Perkins | 79 | | | | | **1** | 3 | **1** | 6 | | | | | 0 | 531 |
| 17 | (Australia) Mason Kelly | 22 | 18 | 10 | Ret | Ret | 15 | 14 | 13 | 12 | DNS | DNS | 11 | 15 | 0 | 519 |
| 18 | (Australia) Cameron Crick | 38 | 9 | 15 | 9 | 9 | 7 | 18 | | | | | | | 0 | 459 |
| 19 | (Australia) Cooper Murray | 88 | **Ret** | Ret | **2** | DSQ | Ret | 7 | 12 | 2 | | | | | 0 | 441 |
| 20 | (Australia) Zane Morse | 11 | 8 | 20 | | | 10 | 6 | | | | | | | 0 | 315 |
| 21 | (Australia) Callum Walker | 33 | Ret | 16 | Ret | 13 | 16 | 17 | Ret | 15 | | | | | 0 | 294 |
| 22 | (Australia) Jett Johnson | 117 | 16 | 11 | 19 | 11 | | | | | | | | | 0 | 249 |
| 23 | (Australia) Matt Chahda | 18 | 14 | Ret | 15 | DNS | 8 | Ret | | | | | Ret | Ret | 0 | 213 |
| 24 | (Australia) Jonathon Webb | 88 | | | | | | | | | 10 | 10 | | | 0 | 156 |
| 25 | (Australia) Thomas Maxwell | 88 | | | | | | | | | | | 15 | 11 | 0 | 132 |
| 26 | (Australia) Ryan Gilroy | 11 | | | 17 | 12 | | | | | | | | | 0 | 123 |
| 27 | (Australia) Jackson Rice | 37 | | | | | | | | | 16 | 13 | | | 0 | 123 |
| 28 | (Australia) Aron Shields | 116 | | | | | | | 17 | 18 | | | | | 0 | 105 |
| 29 | (Australia) James Masterton | 219 | DNS | 18 | | | | | | | | | | | 0 | 51 |
| 30 | (Australia) Dean Fiore | 111 | | | | | Ret | DNS | | | | | | | 0 | 0 |
| Pos. | Driver | No. | BAT1 (New South Wales) | | BAR (Western Australia) | | TOW (Queensland) | | SAN (Victoria (state)) | | BAT2 (New South Wales) | | ADE (South Australia) | | Pen. | Points |

Key
| Colour | Result |
|---|---|
| Gold | Winner |
| Silver | Second place |
| Bronze | Third place |
| Green | Other points position |
| Blue | Other classified position |
| Blue | Not classified, finished (NC) |
| Purple | Not classified, retired (Ret) |
| Red | Did not qualify (DNQ) |
| Red | Did not pre-qualify (DNPQ) |
| Black | Disqualified (DSQ) |
| White | Did not start (DNS) |
| White | Race cancelled (C) |
| Blank | Did not practice (DNP) |
| Blank | Excluded (EX) |
| Blank | Did not arrive (DNA) |
| Blank | Withdrawn (WD) |
| Blank | Did not enter (cell empty) |
| Text formatting | Meaning |
| **Bold** | Pole position |
| Italics | Fastest lap |

==== Super3 Series ====
| Pos. | Driver | No. | BAT (New South Wales) | | WAN (Western Australia) | | TOW (Queensland) | | SAN (Victoria (state)) | | BAT (New South Wales) | | ADE (South Australia) | | Pen. | Points |
|---|---|---|---|---|---|---|---|---|---|---|---|---|---|---|---|---|
| 1 | (Australia) Cody Burcher | 15 | **1** | **1** | 1 | **1** | **1** | **2** | **1** | **3** | 1 | **1** | | | 0 | 1416 |
| 2 | (Australia) Thomas Maxwell | 3 | 2 | 2 | **2** | 2 | 2 | 1 | 2 | 2 | **Ret** | 2 | | | 0 | 1110 |
| 3 | (Australia) Tony Auddino | 4 | | | 3 | 3 | | | 3 | 1 | | | WD | WD | 0 | 438 |
| 4 | (Australia) Bailey Sweeny | 999 | | | | | | | | | 2 | 3 | | | 0 | 267 |
| 5 | (Australia) Antonio Molluso | 49 | | | | | | | WD | WD | | | | | 0 | 0 |
| Pos. | Driver | No. | BAT (New South Wales) | | WAN (Western Australia) | | TOW (Queensland) | | SAN (Victoria (state)) | | BAT (New South Wales) | | ADE (South Australia) | | Pen. | Points |

Key
| Colour | Result |
|---|---|
| Gold | Winner |
| Silver | Second place |
| Bronze | Third place |
| Green | Other points position |
| Blue | Other classified position |
| Blue | Not classified, finished (NC) |
| Purple | Not classified, retired (Ret) |
| Red | Did not qualify (DNQ) |
| Red | Did not pre-qualify (DNPQ) |
| Black | Disqualified (DSQ) |
| White | Did not start (DNS) |
| White | Race cancelled (C) |
| Blank | Did not practice (DNP) |
| Blank | Excluded (EX) |
| Blank | Did not arrive (DNA) |
| Blank | Withdrawn (WD) |
| Blank | Did not enter (cell empty) |
| Text formatting | Meaning |
| **Bold** | Pole position |
| Italics | Fastest lap |
