= 2026 Super2 Series =

Australian motor racing competition

The 2026 Super2 Series is an Australian motor racing competition for Supercars as a support series. It will be the twenty-seventh running of the Super2 Series.

2025 Super2 Champion Rylan Gray will not defend his title as he will graduate to the Supercars Championship with Dick Johnson Racing.

== Calendar ==
Rd	Event	Circuit	Location	Dates
1	Sydney 500	(New South Wales) Sydney Motorsport Park	Eastern Creek, New South Wales	20–22 February
2	Darwin Triple Crown	(Northern Territory) Hidden Valley Raceway	Darwin, Northern Territory	19–21 June
3	Perth Super 440	(Western Australia) Wanneroo Raceway	Neerabup, Western Australia	31 July—2 August
4	Bathurst 1000	(New South Wales) Mount Panorama Circuit	Bathurst, New South Wales	8–11 October
5	Sandown 500	(Victoria (state)) Sandown Raceway	Springvale, Victoria	6–8 November
6	Adelaide Grand Final	(South Australia) Adelaide Parklands Circuit	Adelaide, South Australia	26–29 November

== Entries ==
Manufacturer	Model	Entrant	No.	Driver Name	Class	Rounds
Ford	Mustang GT	Tickford Autosport	5	(Australia) Reuben Goodall		1–5
Ford	Mustang GT	Tickford Autosport	6	(Australia) Ben Gomersall		1–5
Ford	Mustang GT	Tickford Autosport	55	(Australia) Nash Morris		1–5
Ford	Mustang GT	Tickford Autosport	56	(Australia) Campbell Logan		1–5
Ford	Mustang GT	Anderson Motorsport	16	(Australia) Tommy Smith		5
Ford	Mustang GT	Anderson Motorsport	17	(Australia) Ryan Tomsett		1–5
Ford	Mustang GT	Anderson Motorsport	78	(Australia) Zak Best		1–3
Ford	Mustang GT	Anderson Motorsport	78	(Australia) Jonathon Webb		4
Ford	Mustang GT	Blanchard Racing Team	33	(Australia) Bailey Sweeny		1–5
Ford	Mustang GT	Blanchard Racing Team	43	(Australia) Lochie Dalton		1–5
Ford	Mustang GT	Masterton Motorsport	116	(Australia) Hamish Fitzsimmons	R	1
Holden	Commodore ZB	Brad Jones Racing	2	(Australia) Matt Hillyer		1–5
Holden	Commodore ZB	Brad Jones Racing	80	(Australia) Brad Vaughan		1–5
Holden	Commodore ZB	Matt Stone Racing	16	(Australia) Tommy Smith	R	1–4
Holden	Commodore ZB	Matt Stone Racing	28	(New Zealand) Ayrton Hodson		1–5
Holden	Commodore ZB	Matt Stone Racing	777	(Australia) Declan Fraser		5
Holden	Commodore ZB	Matt Chahda Motorsport	18	(Australia) Matt Chahda		1–3
Holden	Commodore ZB	Matt Chahda Motorsport	81	(Australia) Jordyn Sinni		1–2
Holden	Commodore ZB	Matt Chahda Motorsport	81	(Australia) Lincoln Taylor	R	3
Holden	Commodore ZB	Team Kiwi Racing	021	(New Zealand) Brendon Leitch	R	4
Holden	Commodore ZB	Eggleston Motorsport	26	(Australia) Aaron Love		3, 5
Holden	Commodore ZB	Eggleston Motorsport	36	(Australia) Cody Burcher		1–5
Holden	Commodore ZB	Eggleston Motorsport	38	(Australia) Elliot Cleary		1–5
Holden	Commodore ZB	Eggleston Motorsport	54	(Australia) Bayley Hall	R	1–5
Holden	Commodore ZB	Eggleston Motorsport	88	(Australia) Bradi Owen		1–5
Holden	Commodore ZB	Alice Buckley Motorsport (Note: Satellite team of Matt Stone Racing)	50	(Australia) Alice Buckley	R	1–5
Holden	Commodore ZB	Image Racing	57	(United States) Jesse Love	R	TBC
Holden	Commodore ZB	Apogee Motorsport	333	(Australia) Rossi Johnson	R	2

=== Team Changes ===
Triple Eight Race Engineering withdrew from the series to focus on becoming the new Ford homologation team in Supercars.

Walkinshaw TWG Racing withdrew from the series to focus on becoming the new Toyota homologation team in Supercars and its GR Cup program.

Kelly Racing withdrew from the series

Matt Stone Racing rejoined the series after last competing in 2022 with two ex-Triple Eight Race Engineering Holden Commodore ZBs.

Alice Buckley Motorsport joined the series as a satellite team for Matt Stone Racing with a ex-Triple Eight Race Engineering Holden Commodore ZB.

Matt Chahda Motorsport rejoined the series after last competing in 2024 with two ex-Walkinshaw Andretti United Holden Commodore ZBs.

=== Driver Changes ===
Rylan Gray, Jobe Stewart, Zach Bates and Jackson Walls all graduated to the Supercars Championship with Dick Johnson Racing, Erebus Motorsport, Matt Stone Racing and Triple Eight Race Engineering respectively.

Ayrton Hodson moved from Anderson Motorsport to Matt Stone Racing. He was replaced by 3x Super2 runner-up Zak Best who rejoins the team and the series after last competing with the team in 2023.

Lachlan Dalton left Tickford Autosport.

Ben Gomersall moved from Triple Eight Race Engineering to Tickford Autosport

Campbell Logan moved from Walkinshaw Andretti United to Tickford Autosport

Tommy Smith graduated from Trans Am Series to race with Matt Stone Racing. Ahead of the Sandown round, Smith moved from Matt Stone Racing to Anderson Motorsport. Declan Fraser was drafted in to replace Smith at Matt Stone Racing.

Matt Hillyer moved from Walkinshaw TWG Racing to Brad Jones Racing to replace Cody Gillis.

Alice Buckley graduated from Trans Am Series to race with Alice Buckley Motorsport.

Bayley Hall graduated from Porsche Carrera Cup to race with Eggleston Motorsport.

Jordyn Sinni moved from Eggleston Motorsport to Matt Chada Motorsport.

== Results and Standings ==
=== Season Summary ===
Rd	Event	Pole position	Fastest lap	Winning Driver	Winning Team	Winning Car	Round Winner
1	Sydney SuperNight 500	(Australia) Zak Best	(Australia) Reuben Goodall	(Australia) Brad Vaughan	Brad Jones Racing	Holden Commodore (ZB)	(Australia) Lochie Dalton
1	Sydney SuperNight 500	(Australia) Lochie Dalton	(Australia) Lochie Dalton	(Australia) Lochie Dalton	Blanchard Racing Team	Ford Mustang GT	(Australia) Lochie Dalton
2	Darwin Triple Crown	(Australia) Lochie Dalton	(Australia) Campbell Logan	(Australia) Campbell Logan	Tickford Autosport	Ford Mustang GT	(Australia) Campbell Logan
2	Darwin Triple Crown	(Australia) Lochie Dalton	(Australia) Lochie Dalton	(Australia) Lochie Dalton	Blanchard Racing Team	Ford Mustang GT	(Australia) Campbell Logan
3	Perth Super440	(Australia) Aaron Love	(Australia) Lochie Dalton	(Australia) Lochie Dalton	Blanchard Racing Team	Ford Mustang GT	(Australia) Aaron Love
3	Perth Super440	(Australia) Aaron Love	(Australia) Reuben Goodall	(Australia) Reuben Goodall	Tickford Autosport	Ford Mustang GT	(Australia) Aaron Love
4	Bathurst 1000	(Australia) Bailey Sweeny	(Australia) Lochie Dalton	(Australia) Lochie Dalton	Blanchard Racing Team	Ford Mustang GT	(Australia) Lochie Dalton
4	Bathurst 1000	(Australia) Bailey Sweeny	(Australia) Brad Vaughan	(Australia) Brad Vaughan	Brad Jones Racing	Holden Commodore (ZB)	(Australia) Lochie Dalton
5	Sandown 500	(Australia) Campbell Logan	(Australia) Campbell Logan	(Australia) Campbell Logan	Tickford Autosport	Ford Mustang GT	(Australia) Campbell Logan
5	Sandown 500	(Australia) Campbell Logan	(Australia) Bailey Sweeny	(Australia) Campbell Logan	Tickford Autosport	Ford Mustang GT	(Australia) Campbell Logan
6	Adelaide Grand Final						

=== Series standings ===
==== Points system ====
Position
1st	2nd	3rd	4th	5th	6th	7th	8th	9th	10th	11th	12th	13th	14th	15th	16th	17th	18th	19th	20th	21st	22nd	23rd	24th	25th	26th	27th	28th	29th	30th
150	138	129	120	111	102	96	90	84	78	72	69	66	63	60	57	54	51	48	45	42	39	36	33	30	27	24	21	18	15

==== Points Standings ====
Pos	Driver	No.	SYD (New South Wales)		HID (Northern Territory)		BAR (Western Australia)		BAT (New South Wales)		SAN (Victoria (state))		ADE (South Australia)	Pen.	Points
1	(Australia) Lochie Dalton	43	5	**1**	**4**	**1**	1	8	1	2	Ret	5		0	1170
2	(Australia) Reuben Goodall	5	2	4	17	3	5	1	Ret	5	2	6		0	1053
3	(Australia) Campbell Logan	56	11	7	1	2	4	7	5	6	**1**	**1**		0	1185
4	(Australia) Brad Vaughan	80	1	5	8	6	6	6	3	1	7	3		0	1176
5	(Australia) Ben Gomersall	6	6	2	3	20	3	4	Ret	7	13	2		0	963
6	(Australia) Nash Morris	55	9	3	7	5	7	2	4	4	3	4		0	1143
7	(Australia) Bayley Hall	54	14	12	2	4	12	6	7	10	14	9		0	888
8	(Australia) Ryan Tomsett	17	3	16	14	10	8	12	9	3	Ret	7		0	486
9	(Australia) Matt Hillyer	2	7	9	6	12	15	16	Ret	13	6	8		0	468
10	(Australia) Cody Burcher	36	12	13	11	8	13	9	8	17	5	14		0	447
11	(New Zealand) Ayrton Hodson	28	13	17	5	14	11	11	13	Ret	11	17		0	438
12	(Australia) Zak Best	78	**4**	6	12	11	Ret	18						0	414
13	(Australia) Bradi Owen	88	18	10	19	9	14	13	11	12	9	12		0	390
14	(Australia) Bailey Sweeny	33	8	8	Ret	18	10	10	**2**	**8**	Ret	11		0	387
15	(Australia) Elliot Cleary	38	19	14	9	7	9	Ret	12	11	4	18		0	375
16	(Australia) Matt Chahda	18	17	11	13	13	17	15						0	372
17	(Australia) Tommy Smith	16	20	15	16	16	19	17	Ret	14	10	16		0	321
18	(Australia) Alice Buckley	50	15	Ret	15	15	16	14	14	15	12	15		0	300
19	(Australia) Aaron Love	26					**2**	**3**			Ret	10		0	267
20	(Australia) Jordyn Sinni	81	10	Ret	10	17								0	210
21	(Australia) Hamish Fitzsimmons	116	16	18										0	108
22	(Australia) Rossi Johnson	333			18	19								0	99
23	(Australia) Lincoln Taylor	81					18	Ret						0	51
24	(Australia) Jonathon Webb	78							6	9				0	0
25	(New Zealand) Brendon Leitch	021							10	16				0	0
26	(Australia) Declan Fraser	777									8	13		0	0
Pos	Driver	No.	SYD (New South Wales)		HID (Northern Territory)		BAR (Western Australia)		BAT (New South Wales)		SAN (Victoria (state))		ADE (South Australia)	Pen.	Points

Key
Colour	Result
Gold	Winner
Silver	Second place
Bronze	Third place
Green	Other points position
Blue	Other classified position
Blue	Not classified, finished (NC)
Purple	Not classified, retired (Ret)
Red	Did not qualify (DNQ)
Red	Did not pre-qualify (DNPQ)
Black	Disqualified (DSQ)
White	Did not start (DNS)
White	Race cancelled (C)
Blank	Did not practice (DNP)
Blank	Excluded (EX)
Blank	Did not arrive (DNA)
Blank	Withdrawn (WD)
Blank	Did not enter (cell empty)
Text formatting	Meaning
**Bold**	Pole position
Italics	Fastest lap
