= 2025 Super2 Series =

Australian motor racing competition

The 2025 Dunlop Super2 Series was an Australian motor racing competition for Supercars as a support series. It was the twenty-sixth running of the Super2 Series, the second tier of competition in Supercars racing.

The Dunlop Series reverted to a single class after competing alongside the Super3 Series class from 2021-2024, officially dropping the Super3 Series due to low grid numbers from the previous year's season with only as many as two or three cars appearing at rounds of the 2024 Dunlop Series Season.

== Calendar ==
Round	Event	Circuit	Location	Dates	Map of circuit locations
1	Sydney SuperNight 500	(New South Wales) Sydney Motorsport Park	Eastern Creek, New South Wales	21–23 February	2025 Super2 Series is located in Australia
2	Tasmania Super 440	(Tasmania) Symmons Plains Raceway	Launceston, Tasmania	9–11 May	2025 Super2 Series is located in Australia
3	Townsville 500	(Queensland) Reid Park Street Circuit	Townsville, Queensland	11–13 July	2025 Super2 Series is located in Australia
4	Ipswich Super 440	Queensland Raceway	Ipswich, Queensland	8–10 August	2025 Super2 Series is located in Australia
5	Bathurst 1000	(New South Wales) Mount Panorama Circuit	Bathurst, New South Wales	9–12 October	2025 Super2 Series is located in Australia
6	Adelaide Grand Final	(South Australia) Adelaide Street Circuit	Adelaide, South Australia	27–30 November	2025 Super2 Series is located in Australia

== Entry list ==
Manufacturer	Model	Entrant	No.	Driver Name	Class	Rounds
Ford	Mustang S550	Tickford Autosport	5	(Australia) Reuben Goodall		All
Ford	Mustang S550	Tickford Autosport	6	(Australia) Lochie Dalton		All
Ford	Mustang S550	Tickford Autosport	55	(Australia) Rylan Gray		All
Ford	Mustang S550	Tickford Autosport	222	(Australia) Nash Morris		All
Ford	Mustang S550	Anderson Motorsport	17	(Australia) Ryan Tomsett	R	All
Ford	Mustang S550	Anderson Motorsport	28	(New Zealand) Ayrton Hodson	R	All
Ford	Mustang S550	Masterton Motorsport	19	(Australia) Jonathon Webb		5
Ford	Mustang S550	Kelly Racing	22	(Australia) Mason Kelly		1–4
Ford	Mustang S550	Kelly Racing	53	(Australia) Max Geoghegan	R	6
Ford	Mustang S550	Kelly Racing	92	(Australia) Cameron McLeod		All
Ford	Mustang S550	Blanchard Racing Team	33	(Australia) Bailey Sweeny	R	All
Holden	Commodore ZB	Eggleston Motorsport	1	(Australia) Zach Bates		All
Holden	Commodore ZB	Eggleston Motorsport	36	(Australia) Cody Burcher	R	All
Holden	Commodore ZB	Eggleston Motorsport	38	(Australia) Elliott Cleary		1–4, 6
Holden	Commodore ZB	Eggleston Motorsport	54	(Australia) Jordyn Sinni		All
Holden	Commodore ZB	Eggleston Motorsport	88	(Australia) Bradi Owen	R	All
Holden	Commodore ZB	Walkinshaw Andretti United	2	(Australia) Campbell Logan		All
Holden	Commodore ZB	Walkinshaw Andretti United	25	(Australia) Matt Hillyer	R	All
Holden	Commodore ZB	Brad Jones Racing	9	(Australia) Cody Gillis		All
Holden	Commodore ZB	Brad Jones Racing	80	(Australia) Brad Vaughan		All
Holden	Commodore ZB	Triple Eight Race Engineering	11	(Australia) Jackson Walls	R	All
Holden	Commodore ZB	Triple Eight Race Engineering	35	(Australia) Ben Gomersall	R	All
Holden	Commodore ZB	Image Racing	53	(Australia) Max Geoghegan	R	1–5
Holden	Commodore ZB	Image Racing	57	(United States) Jesse Love	R	6
Holden	Commodore ZB	Image Racing	118	(Australia) Jarrod Hughes		All
Holden	Commodore ZB	Erebus Academy	99	(Australia) Jobe Stewart		All

=== Team changes ===
Anderson Motorsport would expand to a two-car team, obtaining a second former Dick Johnson Racing Ford Mustang.

Triple Eight Race Engineering would return to the Super2 series, having last participated in 2022.

Matt Chahda Motorsport has withdrawn from the series.

Eggleston Motorsport would expand to a five-car team.

Image Racing would expand to a two-car team obtaining an ex-Erebus Motorsport Holden Commodore ZB which was last used by Will Brown at the 2022 Auckland SuperSprint.

Tickford Autosport would expand to a four-car team.

=== Driver changes ===
Ben Gomersall, Bradi Owen, Ryan Tomsett, Matt Hillyer and Max Geoghegan graduated from the GR Cup series to race with Triple Eight Race Engineering, Eggleston Motorsport, Anderson Motorsport, Walkinshaw Andretti United and Image Racing respectively.

Jackson Walls graduated from the Porsche Carrera Cup Australia series to race with Triple Eight Race Engineering.

Nash Morris returned to the Super2 Series after he spent at Porsche Carrera Cup Australia last year and joined with Tickford Autosport.

Super3 Series Champion Cody Burcher graduated to the Super2 Series with Eggleston Motorsport.

Reuben Goodall switched from Gomersall Motorsport to Tickford Autosport.

Matt Chahda retired from the Super2 Series after competing in the series since 2015.

Super2 Series Champion Zach Bates switched from Walkinshaw Andretti United to Eggleston Motorsport.

Elliott Cleary switched from Brad Jones Racing to Eggleston Motorsport.

Ayrton Hodson graduated from Porsche Michelin Sprint Challenge Australia to race with Anderson Motorsport.

Former Super3 Series Champion Brad Vaughan moved from Tickford Racing to Brad Jones Racing.

=== Mid-season changes ===
Mason Kelly sat out of the rest of the season after Queensland Raceway. He was replaced by Max Geoghegan for the Adelaide 500 who switched from Image Racing to Kelly Racing. The ZB Commodore Geoghegan vacated is scheduled to be driven by 2025 NASCAR Xfinity Series driver’s champion Jesse Love as part of an alliance between Erebus Motorsport and Richard Childress Racing.

== Results and standings ==
=== Season summary ===
Round	Event	Pole position	Fastest lap	Winning driver	Winning team	Winning manufacturer	Round Winner
1	Sydney SuperNight 500	(Australia) Cameron McLeod	(Australia) Cameron McLeod	(Australia) Cameron McLeod	Kelly Racing	Ford Mustang S550	(Australia) Jordyn Sinni
1	Sydney SuperNight 500	(Australia) Cody Burcher	(Australia) Brad Vaughan	(Australia) Jordyn Sinni	Eggleston Motorsport	Holden Commodore ZB	(Australia) Jordyn Sinni
2	Tasmania Super 440	(Australia) Rylan Gray	(Australia) Rylan Gray	(Australia) Rylan Gray	Tickford Racing	Ford Mustang S550	(Australia) Rylan Gray
2	Tasmania Super 440	(Australia) Zach Bates	(Australia) Zach Bates	(Australia) Nash Morris	Tickford Racing	Ford Mustang S550	(Australia) Rylan Gray
3	Townsville 500	(Australia) Lochie Dalton	(Australia) Lochie Dalton	(Australia) Lochie Dalton	Tickford Racing	Ford Mustang S550	(Australia) Lochie Dalton
3	Townsville 500	(Australia) Lochie Dalton	(Australia) Reuben Goodall	(Australia) Lochie Dalton	Tickford Racing	Ford Mustang S550	(Australia) Lochie Dalton
4	Ipswich Super 440	(Australia) Brad Vaughan	(Australia) Rylan Gray	(Australia) Rylan Gray	Tickford Racing	Ford Mustang S550	(Australia) Jackson Walls
4	Ipswich Super 440	(Australia) Jackson Walls	(Australia) Jackson Walls	(Australia) Jackson Walls	Triple Eight Race Engineering	Holden Commodore ZB	(Australia) Jackson Walls
5	Bathurst 1000	(Australia) Lochie Dalton	(Australia) Rylan Gray	(Australia) Lochie Dalton	Tickford Racing	Ford Mustang S550	(Australia) Rylan Gray
5	Bathurst 1000	(Australia) Lochie Dalton	(Australia) Rylan Gray	(Australia) Rylan Gray	Tickford Racing	Ford Mustang S550	(Australia) Rylan Gray
6	Adelaide 500	(Australia) Rylan Gray	(Australia) Rylan Gray	(Australia) Rylan Gray	Tickford Racing	Ford Mustang S550	(Australia) Brad Vaughan
6	Adelaide 500	(Australia) Brad Vaughan	(Australia) Cameron McLeod	(Australia) Brad Vaughan	Brad Jones Racing	Holden Commodore ZB	(Australia) Brad Vaughan

=== Series standings ===
==== Points system ====
Position
1st	2nd	3rd	4th	5th	6th	7th	8th	9th	10th	11th	12th	13th	14th	15th	16th	17th	18th	19th	20th	21st	22nd	23rd	24th	25th	26th	27th	28th	29th	30th
150	138	129	120	111	102	96	90	84	78	72	69	66	63	60	57	54	51	48	45	42	39	36	33	30	27	24	21	18	15

==== Points Standings ====
Pos	Driver	No.	SYD (New South Wales)		SYM (Tasmania)		TOW (Queensland)		QLD (Queensland)		BAT (New South Wales)		ADE (South Australia)		Pen.	Points
1	(Australia) Rylan Gray	55	3	9	**1**	3	3	3	1	5	2	1	**1**	4	0	1569
2	(Australia) Lochie Dalton	6	8	12	20	4	**1**	**1**	4	3	**1**	**3**	8	3	0	1371
3	(Australia) Nash Morris	222	4	10	7	1	4	7	7	2	5	2	9	9	0	1311
4	(Australia) Reuben Goodall	5	12	6	2	5	2	2	17	10	3	5	3	Ret	0	1197
5	(Australia) Brad Vaughan	80	22	2	5	8	20	9	**2**	Ret	9	4	4	**1**	0	1119
6	(Australia) Ben Gomersall	35	6	3	9	15	10	11	9	8	17	12	5	6	0	1035
7	(Australia) Cameron McLeod	92	**1**	8	18	11	Ret	4	12	4	4	9	Ret	2	0	1014
8	(Australia) Jobe Stewart	99	2	14	12	Ret	7	5	13	15	7	7	7	5	0	1002
9	(Australia) Jordyn Sinni	54	7	1	6	16	14	Ret	14	12	6	11	6	7	0	972
10	(Australia) Cody Burcher	36	11	**4**	4	7	11	16	6	6	8	Ret	17	18	0	936
11	(Australia) Zach Bates	1	9	5	14	**2**	13	10	8	Ret	14	8	2	Ret	0	921
12	(Australia) Jackson Walls	11	10	7	10	6	5	8	5	**1**	12	Ret	DNS	DNS	0	885
13	(Australia) Bailey Sweeny	33	14	Ret	13	9	12	6	3	14	18	17	18	12	0	804
14	(Australia) Campbell Logan	2	15	19	8	17	6	12	15	Ret	10	6	10	10	0	798
15	(Australia) Matt Hillyer	25	17	15	Ret	13	9	14	11	7	22	13	11	8	0	768
16	(New Zealand) Ayrton Hodson	28	5	16	16	Ret	Ret	Ret	16	16	20	14	14	17	0	567
17	(Australia) Cody Gillis	9	19	22	11	14	21	15	10	9	15	Ret	Ret	DNS	0	546
18	(Australia) Jarrod Hughes	118	13	20	Ret	10	8	13	Ret	DNS	13	Ret	12	15	0	543
19	(Australia) Ryan Tomsett	17	21	17	19	Ret	15	19	18	11	19	Ret	15	16	0	543
20	(Australia) Bradi Owen	88	20	18	Ret	18	18	20	Ret	17	21	15	13	13	0	534
21	(Australia) Elliott Cleary	38	16	11	15	12	16	17	DNS	DNS			16	11	0	501
22	(Australia) Max Geoghegan	53	23	21	17	Ret	19	21	19	18	16	16	Ret	Ret	0	435
23	(Australia) Mason Kelly	22	18	13	3	19	17	18	Ret	14					35 (Note: https://www.v8sleuth.com.au/erebus-prodigy-dislocated-shoulder-in-qr-wipeout/)	426
24	(Australia) Jonathon Webb	19									11	10			0	150
25	(United States) Jesse Love	57											Ret	14	0	63
Pos	Driver	No.	SYD (New South Wales)		SYM (Tasmania)		TOW (Queensland)		QLD (Queensland)		BAT (New South Wales)		ADE (South Australia)		Pen.	Points

Key
Colour	Result
Gold	Winner
Silver	Second place
Bronze	Third place
Green	Other points position
Blue	Other classified position
Blue	Not classified, finished (NC)
Purple	Not classified, retired (Ret)
Red	Did not qualify (DNQ)
Red	Did not pre-qualify (DNPQ)
Black	Disqualified (DSQ)
White	Did not start (DNS)
White	Race cancelled (C)
Blank	Did not practice (DNP)
Blank	Excluded (EX)
Blank	Did not arrive (DNA)
Blank	Withdrawn (WD)
Blank	Did not enter (cell empty)
Text formatting	Meaning
**Bold**	Pole position
Italics	Fastest lap
