= Campbell Logan (racing driver) =

Australian racing driver (born 2004)

- Nationality: (Australia) Australian
- Born: Campbell William Logan; 10 March 2004 (age 22) Hobart, Tasmania, Australia

Campbell William Logan (born 10 March 2004) is an Australian racing driver who competes in the Super2 Series for Tickford Autosport.

== Career ==
Born in Hobart, Logan made his car racing debut in 2021, competing in Excel Racing Tasmania. In his first season in cars, Logan scored four wins and ten podiums, as well as making a one-off appearance in the Toyota Gazoo Racing Australia 86 Series. In late 2021, Logan sampled an Erebus Motorsport-run Holden ZB Commodore at Norwell Motorplex, as part of an initiative between the team's academy counterpart and the venue.

After sampling TCR, Trans-Am and S5000 machinery in early 2022, as part of the GRM Combine — Driven by Marcos Ambrose iniative, Logan raced in both the Toyota Gazoo Racing Australia 86 Series and Excel Racing Tasmania for the rest of the year. Continuing in the former on a full-time basis in 2023, Logan scored his maiden series win at Townsville, before taking two further wins at Sandown to secure runner-up honours overall. Stepping up to the Super2 Series for 2024, Logan joined Walkinshaw Andretti United for his rookie season in the series. In the six-round series, Logan took a best result of fourth at Townsville en route to a 12th-place points finish. Returning to the team and series the following year, Logan ended the year a lowly 14th in the overall standings with a best result of sixth at both Townsville and Bathurst.

In 2026, Logan returned to Super2, but switched to Tickford Autosport for his third season in the series. After a quiet opening round at Sydney, Logan scored his maiden series win in race one at Darwin and finished second in race two to take his first career round win. During 2026, Logan ventured to Tickford's Supercars Championship operations, to make his series debut as Ben Gomersall's co-driver for the Tailem Bend enduro in the team's wildcard entry.

== Racing record ==
=== Racing career summary ===
Season	Series	Team	Races	Wins	Poles	F/Laps	Podiums	Points	Position
2021	Excel Racing Tasmania	Logan Group	21	4	0	0	14		
2021	Toyota Gazoo Racing Australia 86 Series		2	0	0	0	0	0	– (Note: Championship was declared null and void as not enough events were completed.)
2022	Toyota Gazoo Racing Australia 86 Series	Logan Group	15	0	0	0	1	872	6th
2022	Excel Racing Tasmania	Logan Group	16	2	0	0	10		10th
2023	Toyota Gazoo Racing Australia 86 Series	AWC / Logan Group	15	3	0	0	6	1118	2nd
2023	Excel Racing Tasmania	Logan Group	5	0	0	0	5		
2024	Super2 Series	Walkinshaw Andretti United	12	0	0	0	0	795	12th
2025	Super2 Series	Walkinshaw Andretti United	12	0	0	0	0	798	14th
2026	Super2 Series	Tickford Autosport	6	1	0	1	2	672*	3rd*
2026	Supercars Championship	Tickford Racing						*	*

* Season still in progress.

=== Super2 Series results ===
(key) (Race results only)

Super2 Series results
Year	Team	Car	1	2	3	4	5	6	7	8	9	10	11	12	Position	Points
2024	Walkinshaw Andretti United	Holden Commodore ZB	BAT1; R1; 15	BAT1; R2; Ret	BAR; R3; 16	BAR; R4; 17	TOW; R5; Ret	TOW; R6; 4	SAN; R7; 8	SAN; R8; 9	BAT2; R9; 7	BAT2; R10; 9	ADE; R11; 9	ADE; R12; 13	12th	795
2025	Walkinshaw Andretti United	Holden Commodore ZB	SMP; R1; 15	SMP; R2; 19	SYM; R3; 8	SYM; R4; 17	TOW; R5; 6	TOW; R6; 12	QLD; R7; 15	QLD; R8; Ret	BAT; R9; 10	BAT; R10; 6	ADE; R11; 10	ADE; R12; 10	14th	798
2026	Tickford Autosport	Ford Mustang S550	SMP; R1; 11	SMP; R2; 17	HID; R3; 1	HID; R4; 2	BAR; R5; 4	BAR; R6; 7	BAT; R9	BAT; R10	SAN; R7	SAN; R8	ADE; R11	ADE; R12	3rd*	672*
