= Jobe Stewart =

Australian racing driver

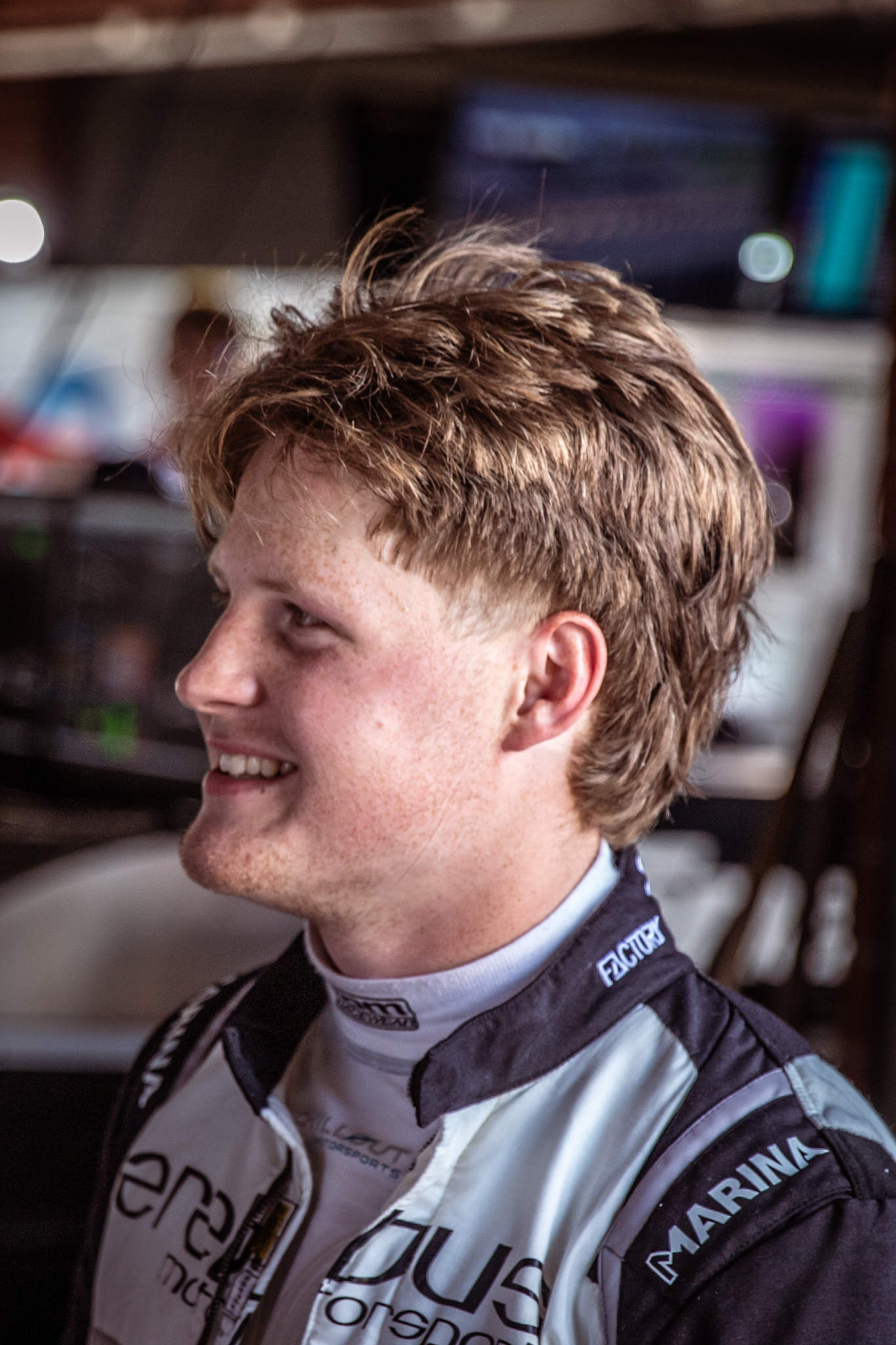
- Stewart at Sydney Motorsport Park in 2026
- Nationality: Australian
- Born: Jobe Isaiah Stewart; 30 April 2004 (age 22) Mount Gambier, South Australia, Australia

Supercars Championship career
- Debut season: 2025
- Current team: Erebus Motorsport
- Car number: 9
- Starts: 27
- Wins: 0
- Poles: 0
- Fastest laps: 0

Championship titles
- 2023: Super3 Series

Jobe Isaiah Stewart (born 30 April 2004) is an Australian racing driver, currently competing in the Supercars Championship for Erebus Motorsport.

== Career Results ==
=== Karting career summary ===
| Season | Series | Position |
|---|---|---|
| 2016 | Australian Kart Championship - Cadet 12 | 7th |
| 2018 | Australian Kart Championship - KA4 Junior | 11th |
| 2019 | Australian Kart Championship - KA4 Senior | 13th |
| 2022 | Australian Kart Championship - X30 | 63rd |

=== Racing career summary ===
| Season | Series | Position | Car | Team |
|---|---|---|---|---|
| 2020 | Toyota Gazoo Racing Australia 86 Series | – (Note: Championship was declared null and void as not enough events were completed.) | Toyota 86 | Jobe Stewart Racing |
| 2021 | Toyota Gazoo Racing Australia 86 Series | – (Note: Championship was declared null and void as not enough events were completed.) | Toyota 86 | Jobe Stewart Racing |
| 2022 | Toyota Gazoo Racing Australia 86 Series | 3rd | Toyota 86 | Jobe Stewart Racing |
| 2023 | Super3 Series | 1st | Holden Commodore VF | Image Racing |
| 2024 | Super2 Series | 5th | Holden Commodore ZB | Image Racing/Erebus Academy |
| 2025 | Super2 Series | 8th | Holden Commodore ZB | Erebus Academy |
| 2025 | Supercars Championship | 26th | Chevrolet Camaro ZL1 | Erebus Motorsport |

=== Super3 Series results ===
(key) (Race results only)

Super3 Series results
| Year | Team | Car | 1 | 2 | 3 | 4 | 5 | 6 | 7 | 8 | 9 | 10 | 11 | 12 | Position | Points |
|---|---|---|---|---|---|---|---|---|---|---|---|---|---|---|---|---|
| 2023 | Image Racing | Holden VF Commodore | NEW; R1; 1 | NEW; R2; 2 | WAN; R3; 1 | WAN; R4; 2 | TOW; R5; 2 | TOW; R6; 2 | SAN; R7; 1 | SAN; R8; 1 | BAT; R9; 2 | BAT; R10; 2 | ADE; R11; 4 | ADE; R12; 2 | 1st | 1686 |

=== Super2 Series results ===
(key) (Race results only)

Super2 Series results
| Year | Team | Car | 1 | 2 | 3 | 4 | 5 | 6 | 7 | 8 | 9 | 10 | 11 | 12 | Position | Points |
|---|---|---|---|---|---|---|---|---|---|---|---|---|---|---|---|---|
| 2024 | Image Racing | Holden Commodore ZB | BAT1; R1; 19 | BAT1; R2; 2 | BAR; R3; 12 | BAR; R4; 7 | TOW; R5; 15 | TOW; R6; 22 | SAN; R7; 2 | SAN; R8; 4 | BAT2; R9; 1 | BAT2; R10; Ret | ADE; R11; 10 | ADE; R12; 3 | 5th | 1077 |
| 2025 | Image Racing | Holden Commodore ZB | SMP; R1; 2 | SMP; R2; 14 | SYM; R3; 12 | SYM; R4; Ret | TOW; 1; 7 | TOW; 2; 5 | QLD; 1; 13 | QLD; 2; 15 | BAT; 1; 7 | BAT; 2; 7 | ADE; 1; 7 | ADE; 2; 5 | 8th | 1002 |

=== Supercars Championship results ===
Supercars results
| Year | Team | Car | 1 | 2 | 3 | 4 | 5 | 6 | 7 | 8 | 9 | 10 | 11 | 12 | 13 | 14 | 15 | 16 | 17 | 18 | 19 | 20 | 21 | 22 | 23 | 24 | 25 | 26 | 27 | 28 | 29 | 30 | 31 | 32 | 33 | 34 | 35 | 36 | 37 | Position | Points |
|---|---|---|---|---|---|---|---|---|---|---|---|---|---|---|---|---|---|---|---|---|---|---|---|---|---|---|---|---|---|---|---|---|---|---|---|---|---|---|---|---|---|
| 2025 | Erebus Motorsport | Chevrolet Camaro ZL1 | SYD; R1 | SYD; R2 | SYD; R3 | MEL; R4 | MEL; R5 | MEL; R6 | MEL; R7 | TAU; R8 | TAU; R9 | TAU; R10 | SYM; R11 | SYM; R12 | SYM; R13 | BAR; R14 | BAR; R15 | BAR; R16 | HID; R17 | HID; R18 | HID; R19 | TOW; R20 | TOW; R21 | TOW; R22 | QLD; R23 | QLD; R24 | QLD; R25 | BEN; R26; 7 | BAT; R27; 4 | SUR; R28 | SUR; R29 | SAN; R30 | SAN; R31 | ADE; R32 | ADE; R33 | ADE; R34 | | | | 26th | 416 |
| 2026 | Erebus Motorsport | Chevrolet Camaro ZL1 | SMP; R1; 23 | SMP; R2; 16 | SMP; R3; 22 | MEL; R4; 20 | MEL; R5; 22 | MEL; R6; 16 | MEL; R7; 18 | TAU; R8; Ret | TAU; R9; 22 | CHR; R10; 16 | CHR; R11; 17 | CHR; R12; 20 | CHR; R13; 20 | SYM; R14; 21 | SYM; R15; 22 | SYM; R16; 22 | HID; R20; 19 | HID; R21; 23 | HID; R22; 19 | TOW; R23; 22 | TOW; R24; 20 | TOW; R25; 18 | BAR; R17; 18 | BAR; R18; 16 | BAR; R19; 18 | QLD; R26 | QLD; R27 | QLD; R28 | BEN; R29 | BAT; R30 | SUR; R31 | SUR; R32 | SAN; R33 | SAN; R34 | ADE; R35 | ADE; R36 | ADE; R37 | 24th* | 498* |
