= Declan Fraser =

Australian racing driver

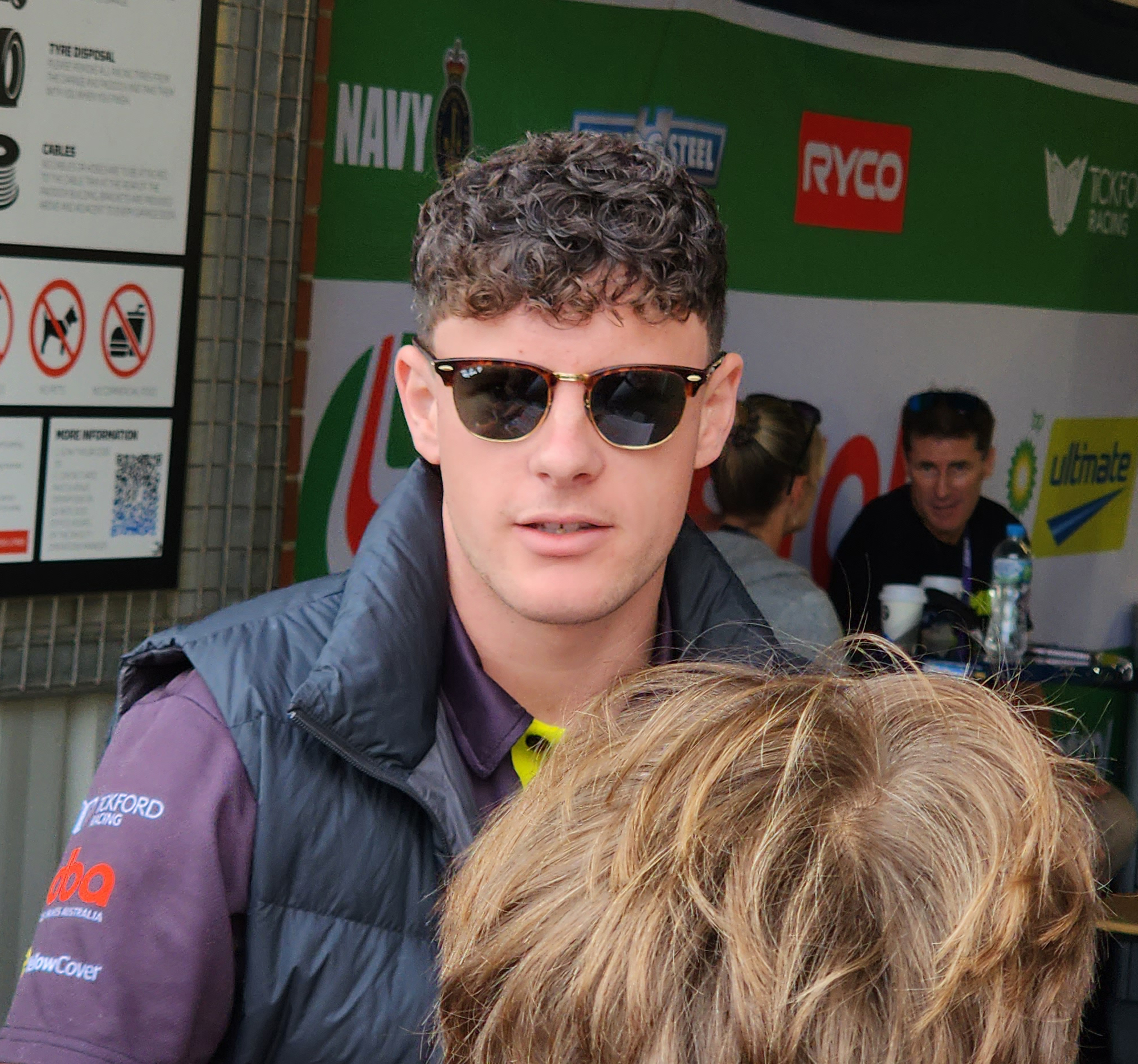
- Fraser in 2023
- Nationality: Australian
- Born: Declan Christopher Fraser; 10 September 2000 (age 26) Castlemaine, Victoria

Supercars Championship career
- Debut season: 2022
- Current team: PremiAir Racing
- Categorisation: FIA Gold
- Car number: 777
- Starts: 58
- Wins: 0
- Podiums: 0
- Poles: 0
- Best finish: 24th in 2023

Previous series
- 2017–2019 2020 2020 2021–2022 2022: Toyota 86 Racing Series Australia; Super3 Series; TCR Malaysia Touring Car Championship; Super2 Series; GT World Challenge Australia

Championship titles
- 2022: Super2 Series

Declan Christopher Fraser (born 10 September 2000) is a racing driver from Australia. He recently competed in the Supercars Championship for PremiAir Racing, driving the #777 Chevrolet Camaro ZL1. before being replaced by Cooper Murray.

Fraser was the 2022 Super2 Series champion.

== Racing record ==
=== Karting career summary ===
Season	Series	Position
2011	Lismore Young Gun Championship - Cadet	**1st**
2011	Queensland Supercheap Series - Cadet	**2nd**
2011	Queensland State Championship - Cadet	**1st**
2012	Queensland State Championship - Rookies	4th
2013	Queensland State Championship - Rookies	**1st**
2013	SKUSA Super Nationals XVII - TaG Cadet	25th
2014	Queensland State Championship - Juniors	**1st**
2014	SKUSA Super Nationals XVIII - TaG Cadet	38th
2014	Victorian Golden Power Series - Juniors	**1st**
2015	SKUSA Super Nationals XIX - TaG Junior	36th
2015	Victorian Young Guns Kart Championship	**1st**
2015	Queensland State Kart Series	**3rd**
2015	Central Queensland CQ Kart Series	**1st**
2016	Australian Kart Championship - KA3 Senior	7th
2016	International Race of Stars - KA3 SNR	**1st**
2017	International Race of Stars – KZ2	18th

=== Career summary ===
Season	Series	Team	Races	Wins	Poles	F/Laps	Podiums	Points	Position
2017	Toyota 86 Racing Series Australia	Declan Fraser Racing	13	0	0	0	0	454	20th
2018	Toyota 86 Racing Series Australia	Declan Fraser Racing	16	1	1	3	3	736	12th
2019	Toyota 86 Racing Series Australia	Paul Morris Motorsport	14	1	0	1	2	922	4th
2020	Super3 Series	Anderson Motorsport	4	0	1	1	3	N/A	N/A (Note: The championship did not meet the required number of races to award a champion or have standings recorded.)
2020	TCR Malaysia Touring Car Championship	Engstler Motorsport	2	0	0	0	0	20	9th
2021	Super2 Series	MW Motorsport	7	0	0	0	1	645	8th
2022	Super2 Series	Triple Eight Race Engineering	11	4	4	1	6	1383	**1st**
2022	GT World Challenge Australia - GT4 Cup	Griffith Corporation	2	1	1	1	2	-	NC (Note: Guest driver. Not eligible for points)
2022	Supercars Championship	Triple Eight Race Engineering	1	0	0	0	0	180	36th
2023	Supercars Championship	Tickford Racing	28	0	0	1	0	1046	24th
2024	GT World Challenge Australia - Pro-Am	Triple Eight Race Engineering	10	1	0	0	4	121	4th
2025	GT World Challenge Australia - Pro-Am	Volante Rosso Motorsport	6	0	0	0	1	49	12th
2026	Supercars Championship	PremiAir Racing	16	0	0	0	0	422*	18th*
2026	Mustang Cup Australia	RM Race Cars							
2026-27	TA2 NZ Championship	Red Hot Couriers							

=== Super3 Series results ===
(key) (Race results only)

Super3 Series results
Year	Team	No.	Car	1	2	3	4	Position	Points
2020	Anderson Motorsport	777	Ford FG Falcon	SYM; R1; 2	SYM; R2; 2	BAT; R3; Ret	BAT; R4; 3	NC	-

=== Super2 Series results ===
(key) (Race results only)

Super2 Series results
Year	Team	No.	Car	1	2	3	4	5	6	7	8	9	10	11	12	Position	Points
2021	MW Motorsport	777	Nissan Altima L33	BAT1; R1; 9	BAT1; R2; 6	TOW1; R3; 10	TOW1; R4; 7	TOW2; R5; 10	TOW2; R6; 10	SMP; R7; 3	SMP; R8; C	BAT2; R9; DNS	BAT2; R10; DNS			8th	645
2022	Triple Eight Race Engineering	777	Holden VF Commodore	SMP; R1; 6	**SMP**; **R2**; 3	WAN; R3; 6	WAN; R4; 3	TOW; R5; 4	**TOW**; **R6**; 1	SAN; R7; 1	SAN; R8; 8	BAT; R9; 5	BAT; R10; C	**ADE**; **R11**; 1	**ADE**; **R12**; 1	1st	1383

=== Supercars Championship results ===
Supercars results
Year	Team	No.	Car	1	2	3	4	5	6	7	8	9	10	11	12	13	14	15	16	17	18	19	20	21	22	23	24	25	26	27	28	29	30	31	32	33	34	35	36	37	Position	Points
2022	Triple Eight Race Engineering	888	Holden ZB Commodore	SMP; R1	SMP; R2	SYM; R3	SYM; R4	SYM; R5	MEL; R6	MEL; R7	MEL; R8	MEL; R9	BAR; R10	BAR; R11	BAR; R12	WIN; R13	WIN; R14	WIN; R15	HID; R16	HID; R17	HID; R18	TOW; R19	TOW; R20	BEN; R21	BEN; R22	BEN; R23	SAN; R24; PO	SAN; R25; PO	SAN; R26	PUK; R27	PUK; R28	PUK; R29	BAT; R30; 8	SUR; R31	SUR; R32	ADL; R33	ADL; R34				36th	180
2023	Tickford Racing	56	Ford Mustang GT	NEW; R1; 15	NEW; R2; Ret	MEL; R3; 24	MEL; R4; 10	MEL; R5; 13	MEL; R6; 21	BAR; R7; 19	BAR; R8; 21	BAR; R9; 23	SYM; R10; 21	SYM; R11; Ret	SYM; R12; 20	HID; R13; Ret	HID; R14; 25	HID; R15; 19	TOW; R16; 14	TOW; R17; 19	SMP; R18; 21	SMP; R19; 25	BEN; R20; 19	BEN; R21; 14	BEN; R22; 17	SAN; R23; 13	BAT; R24; 18	SUR; R25; 20	SUR; R26; 20	ADE; R27; 15	ADE; R28; Ret										24th	1046
2024	Brad Jones Racing	8	Chevrolet Camaro ZL1	BAT1; R1	BAT1; R2	MEL; R3	MEL; R4	MEL; R5	MEL; R6	TAU; R7	TAU; R8	BAR; R9	BAR; R10	HID; R11	HID; R12	TOW; R13	TOW; R14	SMP; R15	SMP; R16	BEN; R17	BEN; R18	SAN; R19; 11	BAT; R20; 16	SUR; R21	SUR; R22	ADE; R23	ADE; R24														37th	258
2025	Brad Jones Racing	8	Chevrolet Camaro ZL1	SYD; R1	SYD; R2	SYD; R3	MEL; R4	MEL; R5	MEL; R6	MEL; R7	TAU; R8	TAU; R9	TAU; R10	SYM; R11	SYM; R12	SYM; R13	BAR; R14	BAR; R15	BAR; R16	HID; R17	HID; R18	HID; R19	TOW; R20	TOW; R21	TOW; R22	QLD; R23	QLD; R24	QLD; R25	BEN; R26; 27	BAT; R27; 7	SUR; R28	SUR; R29	SAN; R30	SAN; R31	ADE; R32	ADE; R33	ADE; R34				55th	34
2026	PremiAir Racing	777	Chevrolet Camaro ZL1	SMP; R1; 19	SMP; R2; 12	SMP; R3; 21	MEL; R4; 22	MEL; R5; 12	MEL; R6; 15	MEL; R7; 11	TAU; R8; 14	TAU; R9; 23	CHR; R10; 18	CHR; R11; 20	CHR; R12; 22	CHR; R13; 10	SYM; R14; 16	SYM; R15; 23	SYM; R16; 17	HID; R17; 20	HID; R18; 15	HID; R19; 18	TOW; R20; 21	TOW; R21; 21	TOW; R22; 21	BAR; R23; 21	BAR; R24; 12	BAR; R25; 16	QLD; R26; 23	QLD; R27; 16	QLD; R28	BEN; R29	BAT; R30	SUR; R31	SUR; R32	SAN; R33	SAN; R34	ADE; R35	ADE; R36	ADE; R37	20th*	680*

=== Complete Bathurst 12 Hour results ===
Year	Team	Co-drivers	Car	Class	Laps	Pos.	Class pos.
2022	MARC Cars Australia	(Australia) Geoff Taunton (Australia) Jake Camilleri	MARC II Mustang	I	143	DNF	DNF

=== Complete Bathurst 1000 results ===
Year	Team	Car	Co-driver	Position	Laps
2022	Triple Eight Race Engineering	Holden Commodore ZB	(Australia) Craig Lowndes	8th	161
2023	Tickford Racing	Ford Mustang S650	(Australia) Tyler Everingham	18th	160
2024	Brad Jones Racing	Chevrolet Camaro Mk.6	(New Zealand) Andre Heimgartner	16th	161
2025	Brad Jones Racing	Chevrolet Camaro Mk.6	(New Zealand) Andre Heimgartner	7th	161

=== GT World Challenge Australia Results ===
(Races in bold indicate pole position) (Races in italics indicate fastest lap)

Year	Team	Car	Class	1	2	3	4	5	6	7	8	9	10	11	12	Position	Points
2024	Triple Eight Race Engineering	Mercedes-AMG GT3 Evo	Pro-Am	PHI1; 1; 5	PHI1; 2; 5	BEN; 1; 1	BEN; 2; 6	QUE; 1; 5	QUE; 2; 3	PHI2; 1; 3	PHI2; 2; 6	BAT; 1; 9	BAT; 2; 2			4th	121
2025	Volante Rosso Motorsport	Aston Martin Vantage AMR GT3	Pro-Am	PHI; R1; 5	PHI; R2; 2	SMP; R3; 10	SMP; R4; 7	QLD; R5; 9	QLD; R6; 4	SAN; R7	SAN; R8	BEN; R9	BEN; R10	HAM; R11	HAM; R12	12th	49
