= Cameron McLeod =

Australian racing driver

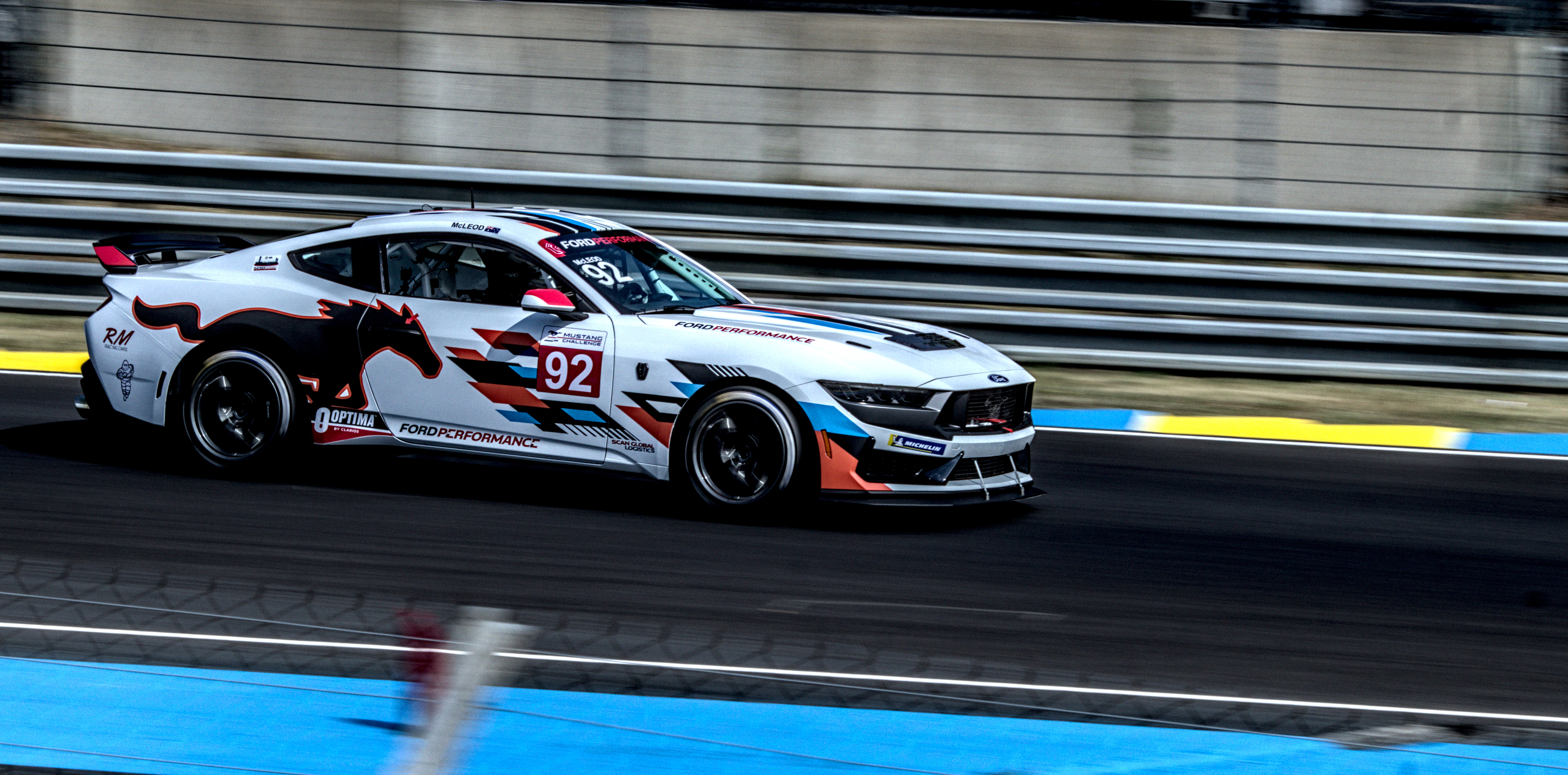
- McLeod competing in the 2025 IMSA Ford Mustang Challenge round at Circuit de la Sarthe
- Nationality: Australian
- Born: 20 December 2004 (age 21) Gold Coast, Queensland
- Relatives: Peter McLeod (grandfather); Ryan McLeod (father)

Super2 Series
- Categorisation: FIA Silver
- Years active: 2024
- Teams: Kelly Racing
- Starts: 22
- Wins: 1
- Poles: 1
- Fastest laps: 2

Previous series
- 2021 2021 2022 2023 2023: F4 British Championship; Formula Ford NSW; Formula Ford Australia; Super3 Series; GT4 Australia Series

Awards
- 2023: Mike Kable Young Gun Award

Cameron McLeod (born 20 December 2004) is a racing driver from Australia who currently competes in the Super2 Series for Kelly Racing. McLeod is a third generation racer; his grandfather Peter won the 1987 Bathurst 1000. He was the winner of the Mike Kable Young Gun Award in 2023.

== Racing record ==
=== Career summary ===
| Season | Series | Team | Races | Wins | Poles | F/Laps | Podiums | Points | Position |
|---|---|---|---|---|---|---|---|---|---|
| 2021 | F4 British Championship | Arden International | 9 | 0 | 0 | 1 | 1 | 23 | 20th |
| 2021 | Formula Ford New South Wales | Machinery Hill Racing | 12 | 0 | 1 | 1 | 8 | 304 | **2nd** |
| 2022 | Australian Formula Ford Championship | Machinery Hill Racing | 21 | 2 | 0 | 2 | 5 | 220 | **3rd** |
| 2022 | Victorian Formula Ford Championship | Machinery Hill Racing | 3 | 0 | 0 | 0 | 0 | 7 | 31st |
| 2023 | Super3 Series | Ryan McLeod Racing | 12 | 8 | 9 | 10 | 9 | 1449 | **3rd** |
| 2023 | GT4 Australia Series | Cali Beach/Gee Up | 3 | 0 | 0 | 0 | 0 | 38 | 22nd |
| 2024 | Super2 Series | RM Racing Cars / PremiAir Racing | 10 | 0 | 0 | 0 | 2 | 810 | 11th |
| 2024 | Supercars Championship | PremiAir Racing | 2 | 0 | 0 | 0 | 0 | 234 | 43rd |
| 2024-25 | GR86 Championship New Zealand | Mackenzie Motorsport | 1 | 0 | 0 | 0 | 0 | -15 | 31st |
| 2025 | Middle East Trophy - 992 | Ajith Kumar Racing by Bas Koeten Racing | | | | | | | |
| 2025 | 24H Series - 992 | Ajith Kumar Racing by Bas Koeten Racing | | | | | | | |
| 2025 | Super2 Series | Kelly Racing | | | | | | | |
| 2025 | IMSA Ford Mustang Challenge | Ryan McLeod Racing Cars | | | | | | | |
| 2025 | Supercar Challenge - Supersport+ | Bas Koeten Racing | 7 | 3 | 0 | ? | 6 | 131 | **3rd** |
| 2026 | GT4 Australia Series - Silver | RM Racing Cars | | | | | | | |
| 2026 | Mustang Cup Australia | RM Racing Cars | | | | | | | |
| 2026 | GT4 European Series - Silver | Academy Motorsport | | | | | | | |

=== Complete F4 British Championship results ===
(key) (Races in bold indicate pole position) (Races in italics indicate fastest lap)

| Year | Team | 1 | 2 | 3 | 4 | 5 | 6 | 7 | 8 | 9 | 10 | 11 | 12 | 13 | 14 | 15 | 16 | 17 | 18 | 19 | 20 | 21 | 22 | 23 | 24 | 25 | 26 | 27 | 28 | 29 | 30 | DC | Points |
|---|---|---|---|---|---|---|---|---|---|---|---|---|---|---|---|---|---|---|---|---|---|---|---|---|---|---|---|---|---|---|---|---|---|
| 2021 | TRS Arden Junior Team | THR1; 1 | THR1; 2 | THR1; 3 | SNE; 1 | SNE; 2 | SNE; 3 | BHI; 1 | BHI; 2 | BHI; 3 | OUL; 1 | OUL; 2 | OUL; 3 | KNO; 1 | KNO; 2 | KNO; 3 | THR2; 1 | THR2; 2 | THR2; 3 | CRO; 1 | CRO; 2 | CRO; 3 | SIL; 1; 14 | SIL; 2; 2 | SIL; 3; 8 | DON; 1; 16 | DON; 2; 13 | DON; 3; 12 | BHGP; 1; 15 | BHGP; 2; 7 | BHGP; 3; 8 | 20th | 23 |

=== Super3 Series results ===
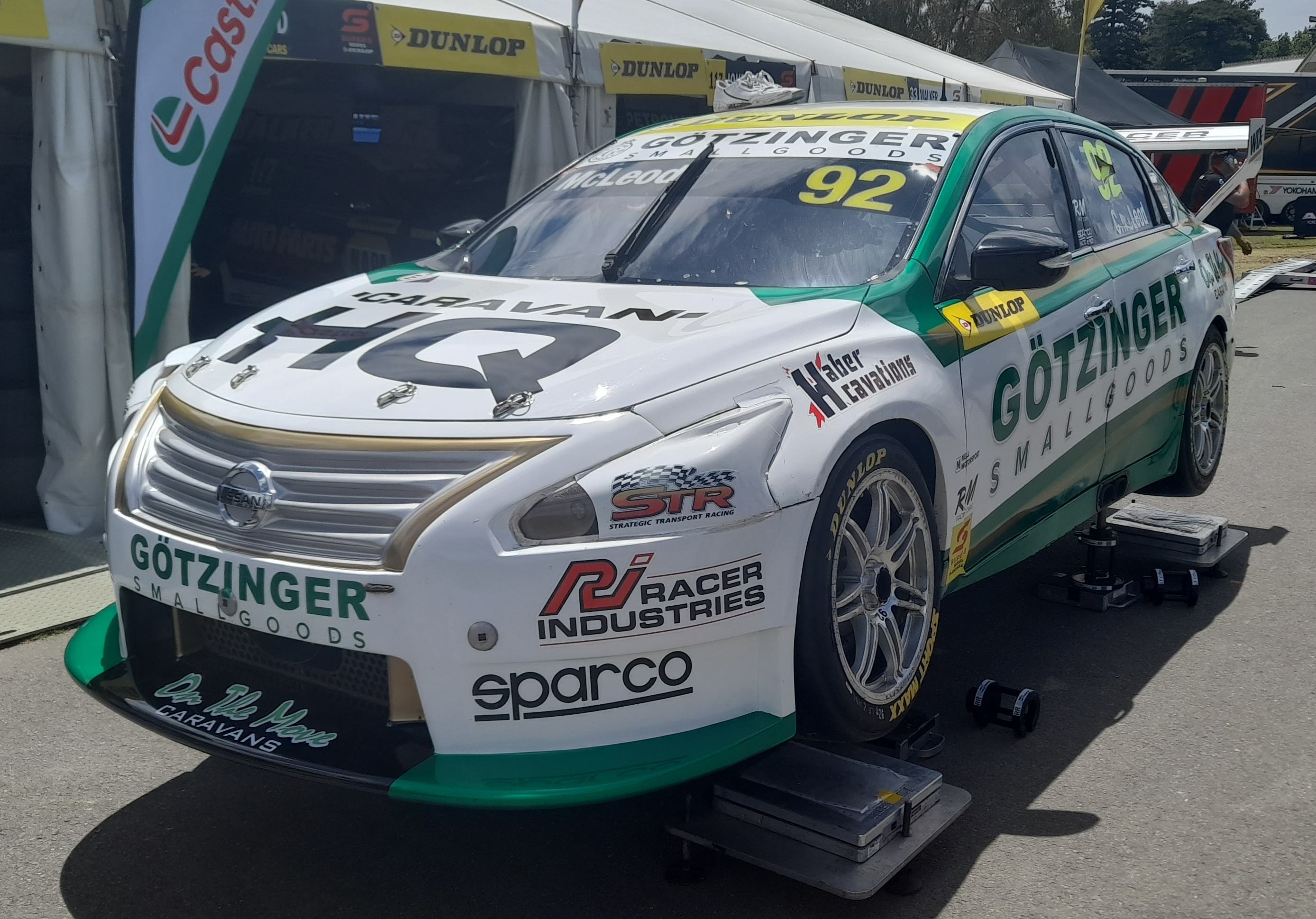
McLeod placed third in the 2023 Dunlop Super 3 Series driving a Nissan Altima

(key) (Race results only)

Super3 Series results
| Year | Team | No. | Car | 1 | 2 | 3 | 4 | 5 | 6 | 7 | 8 | 9 | 10 | 11 | 12 | Position | Points |
|---|---|---|---|---|---|---|---|---|---|---|---|---|---|---|---|---|---|
| 2023 | Ryan McLeod Racing | 92 | Nissan Altima L33 | **NEW**; **R1**; 5 | **NEW**; **R2**; 1 | **WAN**; **R3**; 2 | WAN; R4; 1 | **TOW**; **R5**; 1 | **TOW**; **R6**; 1 | **SAN**; **R7**; Ret | **SAN**; **R8**; Ret | **BAT**; **R9**; 1 | **BAT**; **R10**; 1 | ADE; R11; 1 | ADE; R12; 1 | 3rd | 1449 |

=== Super2 Series results ===
(key) (Race results only)

Super2 Series results
| Year | Team | No. | Car | 1 | 2 | 3 | 4 | 5 | 6 | 7 | 8 | 9 | 10 | 11 | 12 | Position | Points |
|---|---|---|---|---|---|---|---|---|---|---|---|---|---|---|---|---|---|
| 2024 | PremiAir Racing | 92 | Holden Commodore ZB | BAT1; R1; 13 | BAT1; R2; 8 | BAR; R3; 8 | BAR; R4; 3 | TOW; R5; Ret | TOW; R6; 5 | SAN; R7; 21 | SAN; R8; 17 | BAT2; R9 | BAT2; R10 | ADE; R11; 3 | ADE; R12; 8 | 11th | 810 |
| 2025 | Kelly Racing | 92 | Ford Mustang S550 | **SMP**; **R1**; **1** | SMP; R2; 8 | SYM; R3; 18 | SYM; R4; 11 | TOW; R5; Ret | TOW; R6; 4 | QLD; R7; 12 | QLD; R8; 4 | BAT; R9; 4 | BAT; R10; 9 | ADE; R11; Ret | ADE; R12; 2 | 7th | 1014 |

=== Supercars Championship results ===
Supercars results
| Year | Team | No. | Car | 1 | 2 | 3 | 4 | 5 | 6 | 7 | 8 | 9 | 10 | 11 | 12 | 13 | 14 | 15 | 16 | 17 | 18 | 19 | 20 | 21 | 22 | 23 | 24 | 25 | 26 | 27 | 28 | 29 | 30 | 31 | 32 | 33 | 34 | Position | Points |
|---|---|---|---|---|---|---|---|---|---|---|---|---|---|---|---|---|---|---|---|---|---|---|---|---|---|---|---|---|---|---|---|---|---|---|---|---|---|---|---|
| 2024 | PremiAir Racing | 23 | Chevrolet Camaro ZL1 | BAT1; R1 | BAT1; R2 | MEL; R3 | MEL; R4 | MEL; R5 | MEL; R6 | TAU; R7 | TAU; R8 | BAR; R9 | BAR; R10 | HID; R11 | HID; R12 | TOW; R13 | TOW; R14 | SMP; R15 | SMP; R16 | SYM; R17 | SYM; R18 | SAN; R19; 12 | BAT2; R20; 19 | SUR; R21 | SUR; R22 | ADE; R23 | ADE; R24 | | | | | | | | | | | 43rd | 234 |
| 2025 | Matt Stone Racing | 4 | Chevrolet Camaro ZL1 | SYD; R1 | SYD; R2 | SYD; R3 | MEL; R4 | MEL; R5 | MEL; R6 | MEL; R7 | TAU; R8 | TAU; R9 | TAU; R10 | SYM; R11 | SYM; R12 | SYM; R13 | BAR; R14 | BAR; R15 | BAR; R16 | HID; R17 | HID; R18 | HID; R19 | TOW; R20 | TOW; R21 | TOW; R22 | QLD; R23 | QLD; R24 | QLD; R25 | BEN; R26; 11 | BAT; R27; 5 | SUR; R28 | SUR; R29 | SAN; R30 | SAN; R31 | ADE; R32 | ADE; R33 | ADE; R34 | 31st | 345 |

=== Complete Bathurst 1000 results ===
| Year | Team | Car | Co-driver | Position | Laps |
|---|---|---|---|---|---|
| 2024 | PremiAir Racing | Chevrolet Camaro Mk.6 | (Australia) Tim Slade | 19th | 161 |
| 2025 | Matt Stone Racing | Chevrolet Camaro Mk.6 | (Australia) Cameron Hill | 5th | 161 |
