= 2025 Bathurst 1000 =

Motor racing event

(New South Wales) 2025 Repco Bathurst 1000
Event Information
- Round 10 of 13 in the 2025 Supercars Championship
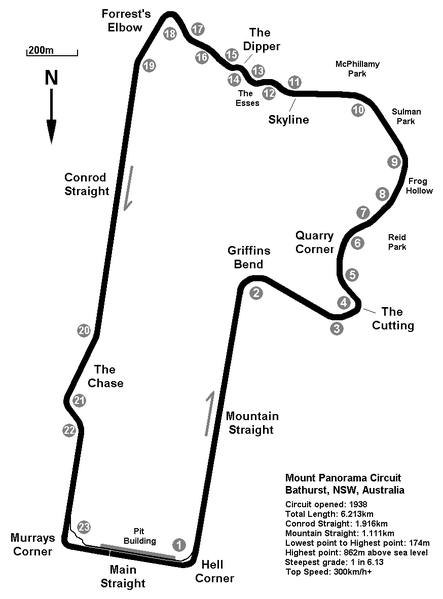
- Layout of the Mount Panorama Circuit
- Date: 9-12 October 2025
- Location: Bathurst, New South Wales
- Venue: Mount Panorama Circuit
- Weather: Cloudy at start, later raining, with fog developing towards the end.

Results
Race 1
Distance	161 laps	1000 km
Pole position	(Australia) Brodie Kostecki; Dick Johnson Racing	2:04.0413
Winner	(New Zealand) Matthew Payne (Australia) Garth Tander; Grove Racing	6:52:14.9378

The 2025 Repco Bathurst 1000 was a motor racing event for Supercars held 9 to 12 October 2025. It was Race 27 of the 2025 Supercars Championship and took place at Mount Panorama Circuit in Bathurst, New South Wales, Australia, featuring a single race of 1000 kilometres.

Matthew Payne and Garth Tander claimed victory for Grove Racing, the team's first win. It was the first win for Payne, while for Tander it was his sixth victory, the first since 2022 and first in a Ford. James Golding took the chequered flag first; however, Golding had made contact with Cooper Murray with five laps to go which resulted in a post-race five-second penalty, relegating him to third.

== Background ==
The event was the 68th running of the Bathurst 1000, which was first held at the Phillip Island Grand Prix Circuit in 1960 as a 500-mile race for Australian-made standard production sedans, and marked the 65th time that the race was held at Mount Panorama. It was the 29th running of the "Australia 1000" race, which was first held after the organisational split between the Australian Racing Drivers Club and V8 Supercars Australia that saw two "Bathurst 1000" races contested in both 1997 and 1998.

Entering the weekend, Broc Feeney of Triple Eight Race Engineering was leading the season championship. This race also marked the last opportunity for drivers to qualify for the Final Series, a new championship format introduced at the beginning of the season. Brodie Kostecki and Todd Hazelwood entered the event as the defending race winners and competed together with Dick Johnson Racing, having moved from Erebus Motorsport at the end of 2024.

=== Entry list ===
Twenty-seven cars were entered for the event - 16 sixth-generation Chevrolet Camaros and 11 seventh-generation Ford Mustangs. In addition to the twenty-four regular-season entries, three "wildcard" entrants joined the field – one each from Matt Stone Racing, Tickford Racing and Triple Eight Race Engineering.

Seven drivers made their Bathurst 1000 debut: Porsche Carrera Cup Australia champion Harri Jones, 2024 Super2 Series champion Zach Bates (son of eight time Bathurst 1000 starter Rick Bates), 2021 Super3 Series champion Nash Morris (son of 2014 Bathurst 1000 winner Paul Morris) and fellow Super2 Series drivers Lachlan Dalton, Rylan Gray, Jarrod Hughes and 2023 Super3 Series champion Jobe Stewart.

No.	Drivers	Team (Sponsors)	Car	No.	Drivers	Team (Sponsors)	Car
1	(Australia) Will Brown (Australia) Scott Pye	Triple Eight Race Engineering (Red Bull, Ampol)	Chevrolet Camaro ZL1	20	(Australia) David Reynolds (Australia) Lee Holdsworth	Team 18 (Tradie Energy)	Chevrolet Camaro ZL1
2	(New Zealand) Ryan Wood (Australia) Jayden Ojeda	Walkinshaw Andretti United (Mobil 1, Truck Assist)	Ford Mustang S650	25	(Australia) Chaz Mostert (New Zealand) Fabian Coulthard	Walkinshaw Andretti United (Mobil 1, Optus)	Ford Mustang S650
3	(Australia) Aaron Cameron (Australia) Zak Best	Blanchard Racing Team (CoolDrive)	Ford Mustang S650	26	(Australia) Kai Allen (Australia) Dale Wood	Grove Racing (Penrite)	Ford Mustang S650
4	(Australia) Cameron Hill (Australia) Cameron McLeod	Matt Stone Racing (Supaglass)	Chevrolet Camaro ZL1	31	(Australia) James Golding (Australia) David Russell	PremiAir Racing (Isuzu Trucks)	Chevrolet Camaro ZL1
5	(Australia) Lachlan Dalton (Australia) Rylan Gray	Tickford Racing (World Gym)	Ford Mustang S650	35	(Australia) Cameron Crick (Australia) Aaron Seton	Matt Stone Racing (Sherrin Rentals)	Chevrolet Camaro ZL1
6	(Australia) Cameron Waters (Australia) Mark Winterbottom	Tickford Racing (Monster Energy)	Ford Mustang S650	38	(Australia) Brodie Kostecki (Australia) Todd Hazelwood	Dick Johnson Racing (Shell V-Power)	Ford Mustang S650
7	(Australia) James Courtney (Australia) Jack Perkins	Blanchard Racing Team (Snowy River Caravans)	Ford Mustang S650	55	(Australia) Thomas Randle (Australia) James Moffat	Tickford Racing (Castrol)	Ford Mustang S650
8	(New Zealand) Andre Heimgartner (Australia) Declan Fraser	Brad Jones Racing (R&J Batteries)	Chevrolet Camaro ZL1	62	(New Zealand) Richie Stanaway (Australia) Nash Morris	PremiAir Racing (Isuzu Trucks)	Chevrolet Camaro ZL1
9	(Australia) Jack Le Brocq (Australia) Jarrod Hughes	Erebus Motorsport (Tyrepower)	Chevrolet Camaro ZL1	88	(Australia) Broc Feeney (Australia) Jamie Whincup	Triple Eight Race Engineering (Red Bull, Ampol)	Chevrolet Camaro ZL1
10	(Australia) Nick Percat (Australia) Tim Slade	Matt Stone Racing (Bendix)	Chevrolet Camaro ZL1	96	(Australia) Macauley Jones (Australia) Jordan Boys	Brad Jones Racing (Pizza Hut)	Chevrolet Camaro ZL1
12	(New Zealand) Jaxon Evans (Australia) Jack Smith	Brad Jones Racing (SCT Logistics)	Chevrolet Camaro ZL1	99	(Australia) Cooper Murray (Australia) Jobe Stewart	Erebus Motorsport (Chiko Roll)	Chevrolet Camaro ZL1
14	(Australia) Bryce Fullwood (Australia) Brad Vaughan	Brad Jones Racing (Automotive Superstore)	Chevrolet Camaro ZL1	100	(New Zealand) Matthew Payne (Australia) Garth Tander	Grove Racing (Penrite)	Ford Mustang S650
17	(Australia) Will Davison (Australia) Tony D'Alberto	Dick Johnson Racing (Shell V-Power)	Ford Mustang S650	888	(Australia) Zach Bates (Australia) Craig Lowndes	Triple Eight Race Engineering (Supercheap Auto)	Chevrolet Camaro ZL1
18	(Australia) Anton de Pasquale (Australia) Harri Jones	Team 18 (DeWalt)	Chevrolet Camaro ZL1				

Entered the race as a wildcard.

== Results ==
=== Practice ===
Session	Day	Fastest Lap						
Session	Day	No.	Driver	Team	Car	Time	Cond	Ref
Practice 1	Thursday	2	(New Zealand) Ryan Wood	Walkinshaw Andretti United	Ford Mustang S650	2:05.103		
Practice 2 (Co-Driver)	Thursday	1	(Australia) Scott Pye	Triple Eight Race Engineering	Chevrolet Camaro ZL1	2:06.840		
Practice 3	Friday	88	(Australia) Broc Feeney	Triple Eight Race Engineering	Chevrolet Camaro ZL1	2:04.976	Fine	
Practice 4	Friday	25	(Australia) Chaz Mostert	Walkinshaw Andretti United	Ford Mustang S650	2:04.659	Fine	
Practice 5 (Co-Driver)	Saturday	1	(Australia) Scott Pye	Triple Eight Race Engineering	Chevrolet Camaro ZL1	2:05.665	Fine	
Practice 6	Saturday	88	(Australia) Broc Feeney	Triple Eight Race Engineering	Chevrolet Camaro ZL1	2:04.969	Fine	
Warm Up	Sunday	1	(Australia) Will Brown	Triple Eight Race Engineering	Chevrolet Camaro ZL1	2:05.169	Fine	

=== Qualifying ===
==== Provisional ====
Pos.	No.	Driver	Team	Car	Time	Gap	Grid
1	38	(Australia) Brodie Kostecki	Dick Johnson Racing	Ford Mustang S650	2:04.0307		Top 10
2	88	(Australia) Broc Feeney	Triple Eight Race Engineering	Chevrolet Camaro ZL1	2:04.0371	+0.0064	Top 10
3	2	(New Zealand) Ryan Wood	Walkinshaw Andretti United	Ford Mustang S650	2:04.0867	+0.0560	Top 10
4	18	(Australia) Anton de Pasquale	Team 18	Chevrolet Camaro ZL1	2:04.0877	+0.0570	Top 10
5	99	(Australia) Cooper Murray	Erebus Motorsport	Chevrolet Camaro ZL1	2:04.0936	+0.0629	Top 10
6	25	(Australia) Chaz Mostert	Walkinshaw Andretti United	Ford Mustang S650	2:04.1280	+0.0973	Top 10
7	6	(Australia) Cameron Waters	Tickford Racing	Ford Mustang S650	2:04.1806	+0.1499	Top 10
8	4	(Australia) Cameron Hill	Matt Stone Racing	Chevrolet Camaro ZL1	2:04.2177	+0.1870	Top 10
9	10	(Australia) Nick Percat	Matt Stone Racing	Chevrolet Camaro ZL1	2:04.2280	+0.1973	Top 10
10	55	(Australia) Thomas Randle	Tickford Racing	Ford Mustang S650	2:04.2482	+0.2175	Top 10
11	96	(Australia) Macauley Jones	Brad Jones Racing	Chevrolet Camaro ZL1	2:04.3038	+0.2731	11
12	1	(Australia) Will Brown	Triple Eight Race Engineering	Chevrolet Camaro ZL1	2:04.3187	+0.2880	12
13	31	(Australia) James Golding	PremiAir Racing	Chevrolet Camaro ZL1	2:04.3268	+0.2961	13
14	17	(Australia) Will Davison	Dick Johnson Racing	Ford Mustang S650	2:04.3911	+0.3604	14
15	20	(Australia) David Reynolds	Team 18	Chevrolet Camaro ZL1	2:04.4442	+0.4135	15
16	888	(Australia) Zach Bates	Triple Eight Race Engineering	Chevrolet Camaro ZL1	2:04.4843	+0.4536	16
17	9	(Australia) Jack Le Brocq	Erebus Motorsport	Chevrolet Camaro ZL1	2:04.5590	+0.5283	17
18	100	(New Zealand) Matthew Payne	Grove Racing	Ford Mustang S650	2:04.5998	+0.5691	18
19	8	(New Zealand) Andre Heimgartner	Brad Jones Racing	Chevrolet Camaro ZL1	2:04.6150	+0.5843	19
20	3	(Australia) Aaron Cameron	Blanchard Racing Team	Ford Mustang S650	2:04.6598	+0.6291	20
21	26	(Australia) Kai Allen	Grove Racing	Ford Mustang S650	2:04.7007	+0.6700	21
22	7	(Australia) James Courtney	Blanchard Racing Team	Ford Mustang S650	2:04.8584	+0.8277	22
23	62	(New Zealand) Richie Stanaway	PremiAir Racing	Chevrolet Camaro ZL1	2:04.8817	+0.8510	23
24	12	(New Zealand) Jaxon Evans	Brad Jones Racing	Chevrolet Camaro ZL1	2:04.9054	+0.8747	24
25	14	(Australia) Bryce Fullwood	Brad Jones Racing	Chevrolet Camaro ZL1	2:04.9496	+0.9189	25
26	35	(Australia) Cameron Crick	Matt Stone Racing	Chevrolet Camaro ZL1	2:05.4230	+1.3923	26
27	5	(Australia) Lachlan Dalton	Tickford Racing	Ford Mustang S650	2:05.4785	+1.4478	27

==== Top 10 Shootout ====
Pos.	No.	Driver	Team	Car	Time	Gap	Grid
1	38	(Australia) Brodie Kostecki	Dick Johnson Racing	Ford Mustang S650	2:04.0413		1
2	6	(Australia) Cameron Waters	Tickford Racing	Ford Mustang S650	2:04.2173	+0.1760	2
3	25	(Australia) Chaz Mostert	Walkinshaw Andretti United	Ford Mustang S650	2:04.3582	+0.3169	3
4	2	(New Zealand) Ryan Wood	Walkinshaw Andretti United	Ford Mustang S650	2:04.4426	+0.4013	4
5	88	(Australia) Broc Feeney	Triple Eight Race Engineering	Chevrolet Camaro ZL1	2:04.5940	+0.5527	5
6	99	(Australia) Cooper Murray	Erebus Motorsport	Chevrolet Camaro ZL1	2:04.6004	+0.5591	6
7	55	(Australia) Thomas Randle	Tickford Racing	Ford Mustang S650	2:04.7354	+0.6941	7
8	4	(Australia) Cameron Hill	Matt Stone Racing	Chevrolet Camaro ZL1	2:04.8845	+0.8432	8
9	18	(Australia) Anton de Pasquale	Team 18	Chevrolet Camaro ZL1	2:04.9111	+0.8698	9
10	10	(Australia) Nick Percat	Matt Stone Racing	Chevrolet Camaro ZL1	2:05.4292	+1.3879	10

=== Grid ===
Inside row			Outside row		
1	(Australia) Brodie Kostecki (Australia) Todd Hazelwood	38	6	(Australia) Cameron Waters (Australia) Mark Winterbottom	2
1	Dick Johnson Racing (Ford Mustang S650)		Tickford Racing (Ford Mustang S650)		2
3	(Australia) Chaz Mostert (New Zealand) Fabian Coulthard	25	2	(New Zealand) Ryan Wood (Australia) Jayden Ojeda	4
3	Walkinshaw Andretti United (Ford Mustang S650)		Walkinshaw Andretti United (Ford Mustang S650)		4
5	(Australia) Broc Feeney (Australia) Jamie Whincup	88	99	(Australia) Cooper Murray (Australia) Jobe Stewart	6
5	Triple Eight Race Engineering (Chevrolet Camaro Mk.6)		Erebus Motorsport (Chevrolet Camaro Mk.6)		6
7	(Australia) Thomas Randle (Australia) James Moffat	55	4	(Australia) Cameron Hill (Australia) Cameron McLeod	8
7	Tickford Racing (Ford Mustang S650)		Matt Stone Racing (Chevrolet Camaro Mk.6)		8
9	(Australia) Anton de Pasquale (Australia) Harri Jones	18	10	(Australia) Nick Percat (Australia) Tim Slade	10
9	Team 18 (Chevrolet Camaro Mk.6)		Matt Stone Racing (Chevrolet Camaro Mk.6)		10
11	(Australia) Macauley Jones (Australia) Jordan Boys	96	1	(Australia) Will Brown (Australia) Scott Pye	12
11	Brad Jones Racing (Chevrolet Camaro Mk.6)		Triple Eight Race Engineering (Chevrolet Camaro Mk.6)		12
13	(Australia) James Golding (Australia) David Russell	31	17	(Australia) Will Davison (Australia) Tony D'Alberto	14
13	PremiAir Racing (Chevrolet Camaro Mk.6)		Dick Johnson Racing (Ford Mustang S650)		14
15	(Australia) David Reynolds (Australia) Lee Holdsworth	20	888	(Australia) Zach Bates (Australia) Craig Lowndes	16
15	Team 18 (Chevrolet Camaro Mk.6)		Triple Eight Race Engineering (Chevrolet Camaro Mk.6)		16
17	(Australia) Jack Le Brocq (Australia) Jarrod Hughes	9	100	(New Zealand) Matthew Payne (Australia) Garth Tander	18
17	Erebus Motorsport (Chevrolet Camaro Mk.6)		Grove Racing (Ford Mustang S650)		18
19	(New Zealand) Andre Heimgartner (Australia) Declan Fraser	8	3	(Australia) Aaron Cameron (Australia) Zak Best	20
19	Brad Jones Racing (Chevrolet Camaro Mk.6)		Blanchard Racing Team (Ford Mustang S650)		20
21	(Australia) Kai Allen (Australia) Dale Wood	26	7	(Australia) James Courtney (Australia) Jack Perkins	22
21	Grove Racing (Ford Mustang S650)		Blanchard Racing Team (Ford Mustang S650)		22
23	(New Zealand) Richie Stanaway (Australia) Nash Morris	62	12	(New Zealand) Jaxon Evans (Australia) Jack Smith	24
23	PremiAir Racing (Chevrolet Camaro Mk.6)		Brad Jones Racing (Chevrolet Camaro Mk.6)		24
25	(Australia) Bryce Fullwood (Australia) Brad Vaughan	14	35	(Australia) Cameron Crick (Australia) Aaron Seton	26
25	Brad Jones Racing (Chevrolet Camaro Mk.6)		Matt Stone Racing (Chevrolet Camaro Mk.6)		26
27	(Australia) Lachlan Dalton (Australia) Rylan Gray	5			
27	Tickford Racing (Ford Mustang S650)				

=== Race ===
Pos.	No.	Drivers	Team	Car	Laps	Time/Retired	Grid	Points
1	100	(New Zealand) Matthew Payne (Australia) Garth Tander	Grove Racing	Ford Mustang S650	161	6:52:14.938	18	300
2	20	(Australia) David Reynolds (Australia) Lee Holdsworth	Team 18	Chevrolet Camaro ZL1	161	+0.959	15	276
3	31	(Australia) James Golding (Australia) David Russell	PremiAir Racing	Chevrolet Camaro ZL1	161	+4.039 (Note: Car 31 passed the finish line first but was relegated to 3rd after receiving a 5-second time penalty for a driving infringement on Car 99.)	13	254
4	99	(Australia) Cooper Murray (Australia) Jobe Stewart	Erebus Motorsport	Chevrolet Camaro ZL1	161	+4.697	6	234
5	4	(Australia) Cameron Hill (Australia) Cameron McLeod	Matt Stone Racing	Chevrolet Camaro ZL1	161	+7.716	8	215
6	88	(Australia) Broc Feeney (Australia) Jamie Whincup	Triple Eight Race Engineering	Chevrolet Camaro ZL1	161	+11.216	5	198
7	8	(New Zealand) Andre Heimgartner (Australia) Declan Fraser	Brad Jones Racing	Chevrolet Camaro ZL1	161	+14.083	19	182
8	26	(Australia) Kai Allen (Australia) Dale Wood	Grove Racing	Ford Mustang S650	161	+22.069	21	167
9	3	(Australia) Aaron Cameron (Australia) Zak Best	Blanchard Racing Team	Ford Mustang S650	161	+23.384	20	154
10	888	(Australia) Craig Lowndes (Australia) Zach Bates	Triple Eight Race Engineering	Chevrolet Camaro ZL1	161	+25.821	16	142
11	55	(Australia) Thomas Randle (Australia) James Moffat	Tickford Racing	Ford Mustang S650	161	+29.827	7	130
12	6	(Australia) Cameron Waters (Australia) Mark Winterbottom	Tickford Racing	Ford Mustang S650	161	+42.032	2	120
13	5	(Australia) Rylan Gray (Australia) Lochie Dalton	Tickford Racing	Ford Mustang S650	161	+46.180	27	110
14	9	(Australia) Jack Le Brocq (Australia) Jarrod Hughes	Erebus Motorsport	Chevrolet Camaro ZL1	161	+50.547	17	101
15	35	(Australia) Cameron Crick (Australia) Aaron Seton	Matt Stone Racing	Chevrolet Camaro ZL1	161	+57.147	26	93
16	96	(Australia) Macauley Jones (Australia) Jordan Boys	Brad Jones Racing	Chevrolet Camaro ZL1	159	+2 laps	11	86
17	1	(Australia) Will Brown (Australia) Scott Pye	Triple Eight Race Engineering	Chevrolet Camaro ZL1	159	+2 laps	12	79
18	38	(Australia) Brodie Kostecki (Australia) Todd Hazelwood	Dick Johnson Racing	Ford Mustang S650	155	+6 laps	1	73
19	2	(New Zealand) Ryan Wood (Australia) Jayden Ojeda	Walkinshaw Andretti United	Ford Mustang S650	149	+12 laps	4	67
20	18	(Australia) Anton de Pasquale (Australia) Harri Jones	Team 18	Chevrolet Camaro ZL1	141	+20 laps	9	62
21	14	(Australia) Bryce Fullwood (Australia) Brad Vaughan	Brad Jones Racing	Chevrolet Camaro ZL1	140	+21 laps	25	57
Ret	62	(New Zealand) Richie Stanaway (Australia) Nash Morris	PremiAir Racing	Chevrolet Camaro ZL1	143	Accident	23	0
Ret	12	(New Zealand) Jaxon Evans (Australia) Jack Smith	Brad Jones Racing	Chevrolet Camaro ZL1	129	Accident	24	0
Ret	7	(Australia) James Courtney (Australia) Jack Perkins	Blanchard Racing Team	Ford Mustang S650	127	Gearbox/Transaxle	22	0
Ret	25	(Australia) Chaz Mostert (New Zealand) Fabian Coulthard	Walkinshaw Andretti United	Ford Mustang S650	57	Engine	3	0
Ret	17	(Australia) Will Davison (Australia) Tony D'Alberto	Dick Johnson Racing	Ford Mustang S650	53	Accident	14	0
Ret	10	(Australia) Nick Percat (Australia) Tim Slade	Matt Stone Racing	Chevrolet Camaro ZL1	50	Engine	10	0
Fastest lap set by Will Brown - 2:06.7265 on Lap 32

== Broadcast ==
The event telecast was produced by Supercars Media and carried domestically by Fox Sports Australia (via Fox Sports 506 and Kayo Sports), a paid service which covered all sessions including support categories, and the Seven Network (via free-to-air channels 7HD and 7mate, as well as streaming on 7plus), which covered select sessions from midday Friday onwards. 2025 marked the last commentary appearance for Neil Crompton at the Bathurst 1000, who had been involved in broadcasting the race (with breaks for his driving career) since 1985.

Fox Sports	Seven Network
Host: Jessica Yates; Booth: Mark Skaife, Neil Crompton; Pit-lane: Mark Larkham, Riana Crehan, Chad Neylon	Presenters: Mark Beretta, Mel McLaughlin; Pundit: Jack Perkins; Roving: Emma Freedman, Chris Stubbs
