= Reid Park Street Circuit =

Motorsport circuit in Townsville, Australia

- Street Circuit (2009–present)
- Location: Townsville, Queensland
- Coordinates: 19°16′19″S 146°48′33″E
- FIA Grade: 3
- Opened: 10 July 2009; 17 years ago
- Major events: Current: Supercars Championship; Townsville 500 (2009–present); Aussie Racing Cars (2012, 2017, 2023–2024, 2026); Porsche Sprint Challenge Australia (2024–present); TGR Australia (2017–2019, 2021–present); Touring Car Masters (2018, 2022, 2026); Former: Super2 Series (2009-2019, 2021–2025); Super3 Series (2021–2024); SuperUtes Series (2018–2019, 2025); Australian GT (2011, 2014–2017); Australian Formula 4 (2015); Australian Formula Ford (2010, 2012–2013); Carrera Cup Australia (2011–2015, 2019, 2021–2023); Stadium Super Trucks (2016, 2021)

Street Circuit (2009–present)
- Length: 2.860 km (1.777 mi)
- Turns: 13
- Race lap record: 1:11.9875 ( (Germany) Christopher Mies, Audi R8 LMS GT3, 2016, GT3)

Reid Park Street Circuit, also known as the Townsville Street Circuit, is a semi-permanent street circuit located in Townsville, Queensland, Australia. Opened in 2009, the circuit hosts the Townsville 500 Supercars Championship event every year.

== The circuit ==
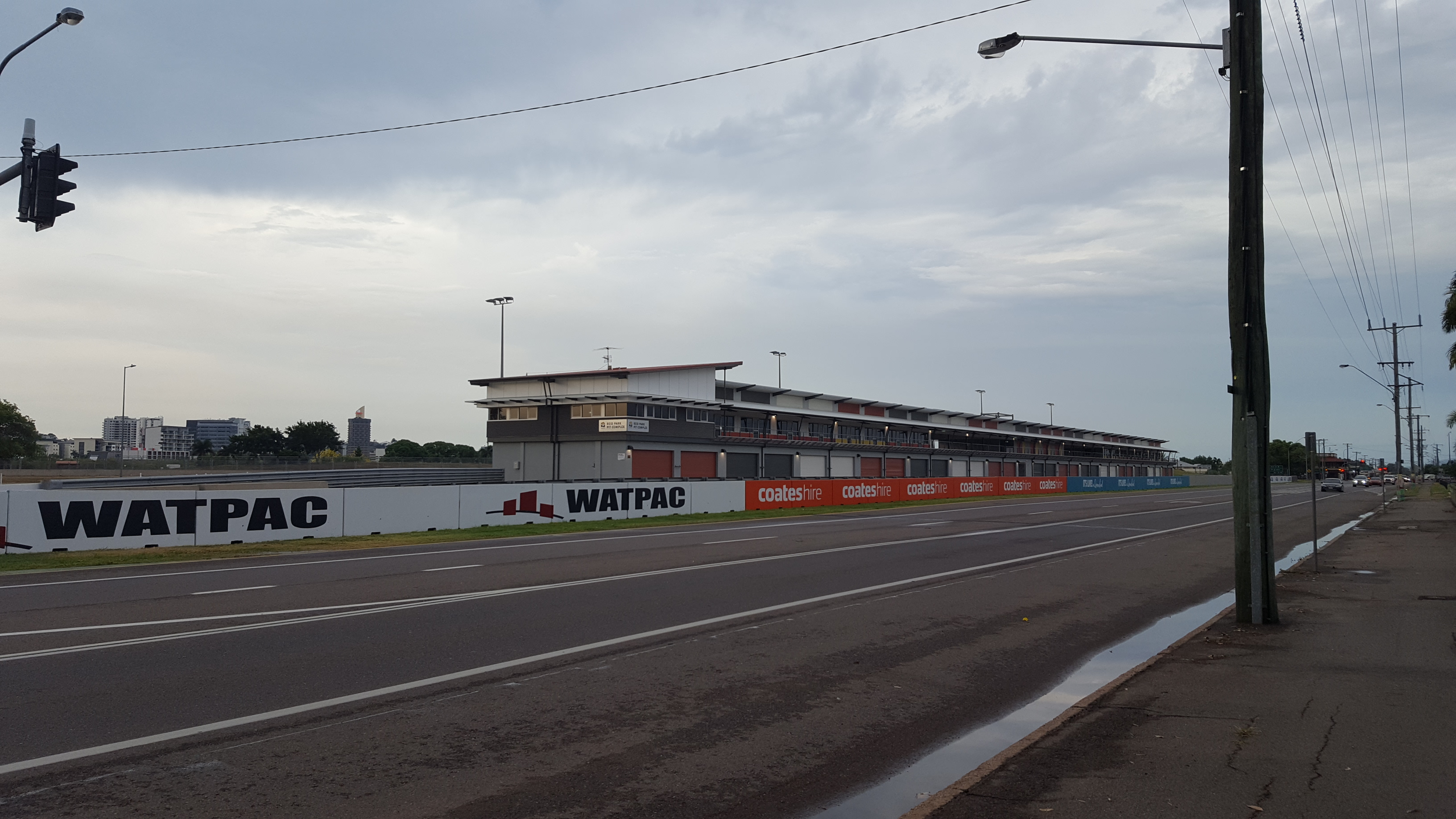
Main straight (Boundary Street) as pictured between events in November 2018

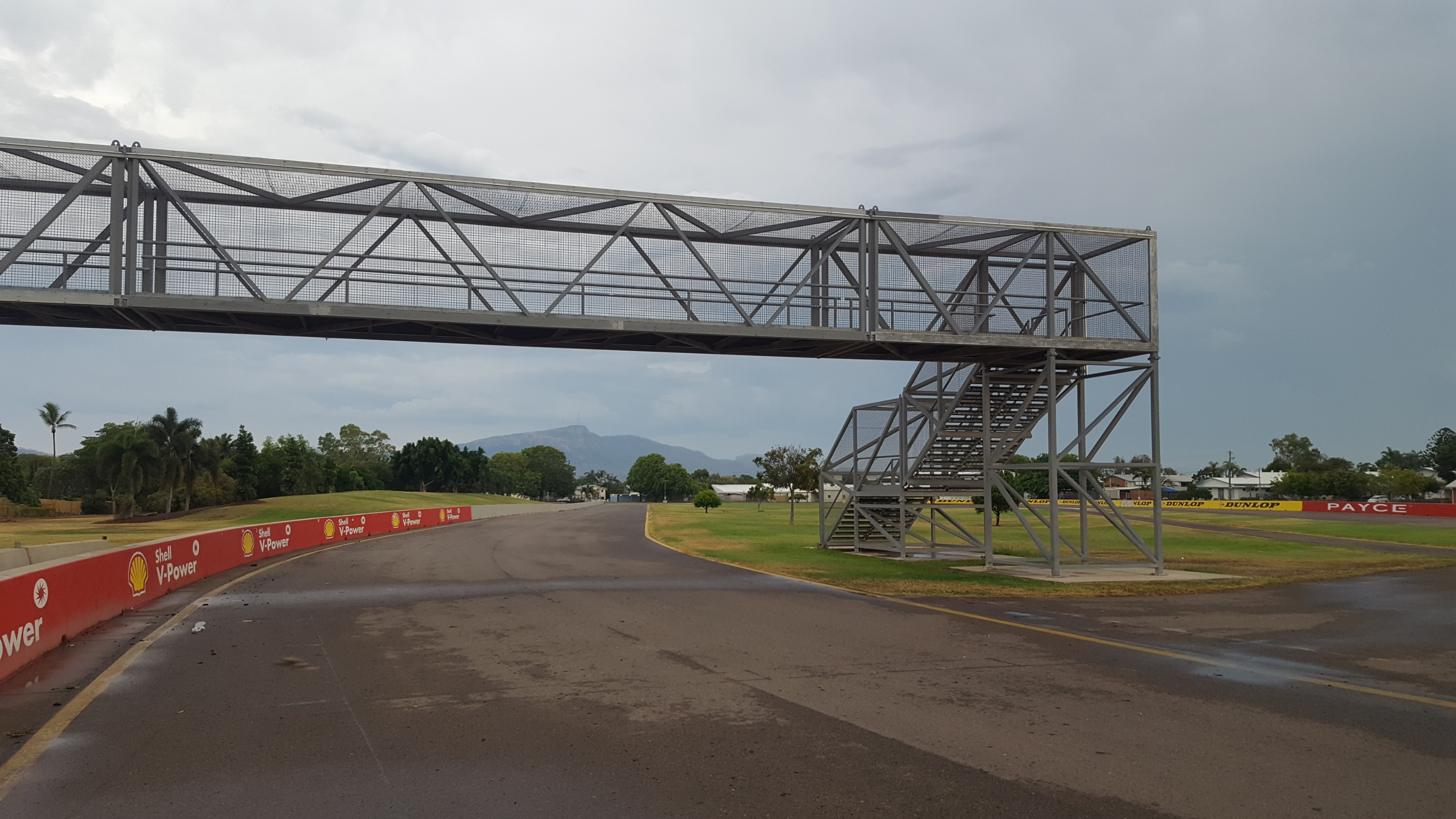
Turn 10 as pictured between events in November 2018

The Reid Park Street Circuit is reminiscent of the Albert Park Circuit's parkland setting. It winds its way through Reid Park where specially constructed roads form approximately 70 percent of the circuit. The circuit borders the Townsville State High School and Townsville Civic Theatre, crosses the Ross Creek multiple times and runs adjacent to Townsville railway station. The circuit's pit building, and much of the Reid Park infrastructure, is a permanent construction that can be used all year round for various events. The event also has five viewing mounds/grandstands that can seat approximately 12,000.

Paul Dumbrell suggested it is a high grip circuit, while Mark Winterbottom stated that the circuit is like a standard racing circuit but in the middle of a city. Winterbottom described the first corner as almost a clone to the high speed turn eight at the Adelaide Street Circuit, noting that it also produces a great passing opportunity exiting the corner.

In February 2019, parts of the circuit were flooded in the 2019 Townsville flood.

In July of 2026 after the conclusion of the 2026 NTI Townsville 500 an independent report recommended resurfacing of the circuit in which the project will undergo resealing 2.08km of the 2.86km Reid Park Street Circuit with $6 Million in funding from the Queensland Government.

== Supercars Championship ==
On 28 July 2008, the official website of V8 Supercars (the then-name of Supercars) reported that the Queensland Sports Minister, Judy Spence, said the State Government will contribute $2.5 million annually for the first five years of the event. The 2009 Dunlop Townsville 400 was held from 10 to 12 July. In 2014, the event was held as a 500 kilometre event with two 250 kilometre races across the weekend.

== Events ==
Current

- July: Supercars Championship Townsville 500, Aussie Racing Cars, Porsche Sprint Challenge Australia, Toyota Gazoo Racing Australia 86 Series, Touring Car Masters

Former

- Aussie Tin Tops (2020–2021)
- Australian Formula Ford Championship (2010, 2012–2013)
- Australian GT Championship (2011, 2014–2017)
- Australian Mini Challenge (2009–2010)
- Formula 4 Australian Championship (2015)
- Porsche Carrera Cup Australia (2011–2015, 2019, 2021–2023)
- Stadium Super Trucks (2016, 2021)
- Super2 Series (2009-2019, 2021–2025)
- Super3 Series (2021–2024)
- SuperUtes Series (2018–2019, 2025)
- V8 Ute Racing Series (2009–2011, 2013–2017)

== Lap records ==
As of July 2025, the fastest official race lap records at Townsville Street Circuit are listed as:

Category	Time	Driver	Vehicle	Date
Street Circuit (2009–present): 2.860 km (1.777 mi)
GT3	1:11.9875	(Germany) Christopher Mies	Audi R8 LMS GT3	9 July 2016
Supercars Championship	1:12.9311	(Australia) Nick Percat	Holden VF Commodore	9 July 2017
Porsche Carrera Cup	1:13.6549	(Australia) David Wall	Porsche 911 (992 I) GT3 Cup	10 July 2022
Super2 Series	1:13.7527	(Australia) Cameron Waters	Ford FG Falcon	6 July 2014
Super3 Series	1:15.7341	(Australia) Cameron McLeod	Nissan Altima (L33)	9 July 2023
Aussie Tin Tops	1:16.1376	(Australia) Geoff Taunton	MARC II V8	18 July 2021
Formula 4	1:16.7182	(Australia) Jordan Lloyd	Mygale M14-F4	12 July 2015
Formula Ford	1:17.3157	(Australia) Chaz Mostert	Spectrum 012	11 July 2010
Touring Car Masters	1:20.2322	(Australia) Ryan Hansford	Holden Torana A9X	9 July 2022
Aussie Racing Cars	1:23.7342	(Australia) Cody Brewczynski	Ford Mustang-Yamaha	5 July 2024
SuperUtes Series	1:25.0898	(Australia) Adam Marjoram	Isuzu D-Max (RG)	12 July 2025
V8 Ute Racing Series	1:26.3008	(Australia) Craig Dontas	Holden VE SS Ute	11 July 2015
Australian Mini Challenge	1:26.3795	(Australia) Chris Atkinson	Mini JCW R56	12 July 2009
Toyota 86 Racing Series	1:27.9145	(Australia) Declan Fraser	Toyota GR86	12 July 2025
Stadium Super Trucks	1:35.3754	(Australia) Toby Price	Stadium Super Truck	10 July 2021
