= GR Cup =

Motor racing championship in Australia

- Category: One-make racing
- Country: Australia
- Inaugural season: 2016
- Constructors: Toyota
- Tyre suppliers: Dunlop
- Drivers' champion: Oliver Wickham

The GR Cup (previously known as the Toyota Gazoo Racing Australia 86 Series) is an Australian one-make motor racing competition for Toyota 86 cars. It is sanctioned by Motorsport Australia as an Authorised Series with Toyota Motor Corporation Australia Ltd appointed as the Category Manager.

The series was first contested in 2016.

The cars used in the GR Cup was changed from the GT86 to the GR86 in 2024

The series has had many notable Supercars names come through, such as Will Brown, Broc Feeney, Cameron Hill, Declan Fraser and Jayden Ojeda.

== Series winners ==
The series was cancelled in 2020, whilst not enough rounds were held to declare a champion in 2021.

Year	Winner	Source
2016	William Brown	
2017	Jimmy Vernon	
2018	Tim Brook	
2019	Aaron Borg	
2020	—N/a	
2021	—N/a	
2022	Lachlan Gibbons	
2023	Ryan Casha	
2024	Max Geoghegan	
2025	Oliver Wickham	
