= Townsville 500 =

Motor racing event

(Queensland) Townsville 500
- Race Information
Venue	Reid Park Street Circuit
Number of times held	19
First held	2009
- Race Format
- Race 1
Laps	35
Distance	100 km
- Race 2
Laps	70
Distance	200 km
- Race 3
Laps	70
Distance	200 km
- Last Event (2026)
- Overall Winner
(Australia) Brodie Kostecki	Dick Johnson Racing
- Race Winners
(Australia) Cam Waters	Tickford Racing
(New Zealand) Matthew Payne	Grove Racing
(Australia) Brodie Kostecki	Dick Johnson Racing

The Townsville 500 (formally known as the NTI Townsville 500) is an annual motor racing event for Supercars, held on the Reid Park Street Circuit in Townsville, Queensland, Australia. The event has been held since 2009.

The event was known as the Townsville 400, based on a 400 kilometre format, in ten of the first eleven years of the event. In 2021, the event returned to the 500 kilometre format first used in 2014, while in both 2020 and 2021, two Townsville events were held under the Townsville SuperSprint banner due to calendar changes and shorter races caused by the COVID-19 pandemic.

== Format ==
The event is staged over a three-day weekend, from Friday to Sunday. Two thirty-minute practice sessions are held on Friday, followed by a 100 kilometre race. Saturday features a fifteen-minute qualifying session which decides the grid positions, succeeded by a top ten shootout for the following 200 kilometre race. A fifteen-minute qualifying session is held on Sunday, succeeded by a top ten shootout, the combined results of which decide the grid for the following 200 km race.

== History ==
The event was announced in late 2007, following the allocation of funding from both the federal and the Queensland state government. The event became the third Queensland event on the calendar, joining Queensland Raceway in Ipswich and the Surfers Paradise Street Circuit on the Gold Coast. However, Townsville did become the first major motor racing event to be held in the North Queensland region. The event is generally held in early July each year, which aligns with the school holidays of the Townsville State High School which borders the track.

Jamie Whincup won the first race on the circuit in 2009, a race which was later reduced by one lap after it was discovered it had extended beyond the time certain finish without being noticed. James Courtney won the Sunday race, his first victory for Dick Johnson Racing. Whincup would go on to win the Saturday race again in 2010 with Mark Winterbottom this time winning the second race. 2011 and 2012 saw four consecutive wins for Holden, with Whincup winning three more races at the circuit. In 2012, Formula One world champion Jacques Villeneuve commenced a three-event substitution for an injured Greg Murphy with a best finish of 24th. In 2013, Russell Ingall broke the all time championship event starts record at the event, while Will Davison hit the fence as part of his post-race victory celebrations in the first race of the weekend. In the Sunday race, the Holden Racing Team scored a one-two finish with Tander leading home Courtney. The team would repeat the one-two finish in the second Saturday race of the 500 kilometre 2014 event, with Tander winning from 11th on the grid in the one-off dual-race Saturday format.

Winterbottom won both races in 2015 to become the only driver other than Whincup, who achieved the feat in 2012, to achieve a clean sweep of the event. In the first ten years of the event, Whincup's record was unsurpassed, winning ten of the twenty-one races held at the track. Only Tander and Winterbottom (three each) and van Gisbergen (two) won multiple races at the circuit up to 2018. 2019 saw the first wet race in the event's history on the Sunday, beginning with Scott McLaughlin and David Reynolds clashing on Lap 1 which led to tensions between the drivers and teams involved extending for over a year. The race eventually saw van Gisbergen prevail after a chaotic race featuring several incidents and a pit lane fire at Brad Jones Racing.

The 2020 event was initially delayed to August due to the COVID-19 pandemic, before a second Townsville event was announced to be held one week later in early September. Both 2020 events, the only Queensland events on the final calendar, used a three-race sprint format under the Townsville SuperSprint event name. 2021 again saw a double-header as the impacts of COVID-19 in Australia persisted, with the first of the two a return to a 500 kilometre event distance last used in 2014. Triple Eight Race Engineering dominated the Townsville 500, leading all but one of the 176 laps, with van Gisbergen prevailing over Whincup in both races.

== Winners ==
Year	Event title	Race	Driver	Team	Car
2009	Dunlop Townsville 400	1	(Australia) Jamie Whincup	Triple Eight Race Engineering	Ford FG Falcon
2009	Dunlop Townsville 400	2	(Australia) James Courtney	Dick Johnson Racing	Ford FG Falcon
2010	Sucrogen Townsville 400	1	(Australia) Jamie Whincup	Triple Eight Race Engineering	Holden VE Commodore
2010	Sucrogen Townsville 400	2	(Australia) Mark Winterbottom	Ford Performance Racing	Ford FG Falcon
2011	Sucrogen Townsville 400	1	(Australia) Garth Tander	Holden Racing Team	Holden VE Commodore
2011	Sucrogen Townsville 400	2	(Australia) Jamie Whincup	Triple Eight Race Engineering	Holden VE Commodore
2012	Sucrogen Townsville 400	1	(Australia) Jamie Whincup	Triple Eight Race Engineering	Holden VE Commodore
2012	Sucrogen Townsville 400	2	(Australia) Jamie Whincup	Triple Eight Race Engineering	Holden VE Commodore
2013	Sucrogen Townsville 400	1	(Australia) Will Davison	Ford Performance Racing	Ford FG Falcon
2013	Sucrogen Townsville 400	2	(Australia) Garth Tander	Holden Racing Team	Holden VF Commodore
2014	Castrol Townsville 500 – Driven by TAFE Queensland	1	(Australia) Jamie Whincup	Triple Eight Race Engineering	Holden VF Commodore
2014	Castrol Townsville 500 – Driven by TAFE Queensland	2	(Australia) Garth Tander	Holden Racing Team	Holden VF Commodore
2014	Castrol Townsville 500 – Driven by TAFE Queensland	3	(Australia) Jamie Whincup	Triple Eight Race Engineering	Holden VF Commodore
2015	Castrol Edge Townsville 400	1	(Australia) Mark Winterbottom	Prodrive Racing Australia	Ford FG X Falcon
2015	Castrol Edge Townsville 400	2	(Australia) Mark Winterbottom	Prodrive Racing Australia	Ford FG X Falcon
2016	Castrol Edge Townsville 400	1	(Australia) Jamie Whincup	Triple Eight Race Engineering	Holden VF Commodore
2016	Castrol Edge Townsville 400	2	(New Zealand) Shane van Gisbergen	Triple Eight Race Engineering	Holden VF Commodore
2017	Watpac Townsville 400	1	(New Zealand) Scott McLaughlin	DJR Team Penske	Ford FG X Falcon
2017	Watpac Townsville 400	2	(Australia) Jamie Whincup	Triple Eight Race Engineering	Holden VF Commodore
2018	Watpac Townsville 400	1	(Australia) Jamie Whincup	Triple Eight Race Engineering	Holden ZB Commodore
2018	Watpac Townsville 400	2	(New Zealand) Shane van Gisbergen	Triple Eight Race Engineering	Holden ZB Commodore
2019	Watpac Townsville 400	1	(New Zealand) Scott McLaughlin	DJR Team Penske	Ford Mustang GT
2019	Watpac Townsville 400	2	(New Zealand) Shane van Gisbergen	Triple Eight Race Engineering	Holden ZB Commodore
2020^{1}	NTI Townsville SuperSprint	1	(Australia) Jamie Whincup	Triple Eight Race Engineering	Holden ZB Commodore
2020^{1}	NTI Townsville SuperSprint	2	(Australia) Jamie Whincup	Triple Eight Race Engineering	Holden ZB Commodore
2020^{1}	NTI Townsville SuperSprint	3	(New Zealand) Scott McLaughlin	DJR Team Penske	Ford Mustang GT
2020^{1}	Robson Civil Projects Townsville SuperSprint	1	(New Zealand) Scott McLaughlin	DJR Team Penske	Ford Mustang GT
2020^{1}	Robson Civil Projects Townsville SuperSprint	2	(New Zealand) Shane van Gisbergen	Triple Eight Race Engineering	Holden ZB Commodore
2020^{1}	Robson Civil Projects Townsville SuperSprint	3	(New Zealand) Shane van Gisbergen	Triple Eight Race Engineering	Holden ZB Commodore
2021^{1}	NTI Townsville 500	1	(New Zealand) Shane van Gisbergen	Triple Eight Race Engineering	Holden ZB Commodore
2021^{1}	NTI Townsville 500	2	(New Zealand) Shane van Gisbergen	Triple Eight Race Engineering	Holden ZB Commodore
2021^{1}	WD-40 Townsville SuperSprint	1	(Australia) Cam Waters	Tickford Racing	Ford Mustang GT
2021^{1}	WD-40 Townsville SuperSprint	2	(New Zealand) Shane van Gisbergen	Triple Eight Race Engineering	Holden ZB Commodore
2021^{1}	WD-40 Townsville SuperSprint	3	(Australia) Cam Waters	Tickford Racing	Ford Mustang GT
2022	NTI Townsville 500	1	(New Zealand) Shane van Gisbergen	Triple Eight Race Engineering	Holden ZB Commodore
2022	NTI Townsville 500	2	(New Zealand) Shane van Gisbergen	Triple Eight Race Engineering	Holden ZB Commodore
2023	NTI Townsville 500	1	(Australia) Will Brown	Erebus Motorsport	Chevrolet Camaro ZL1-1LE
2023	NTI Townsville 500	2	(Australia) Anton De Pasquale	Dick Johnson Racing	Ford Mustang GT
2024	NTI Townsville 500	1	(Australia) Cam Waters	Tickford Racing	Ford Mustang GT
2024	NTI Townsville 500	2	(New Zealand) Matthew Payne	Grove Racing	Ford Mustang GT
2025	NTI Townsville 500	1	(Australia) Brodie Kostecki	Dick Johnson Racing	Ford Mustang GT
2025	NTI Townsville 500	2	(Australia) Broc Feeney	Triple Eight Race Engineering	Chevrolet Camaro ZL1-1LE
2025	NTI Townsville 500	3	(Australia) Broc Feeney	Triple Eight Race Engineering	Chevrolet Camaro ZL1-1LE
2026	NTI Townsville 500	1	(Australia) Cam Waters	Tickford Racing	Ford Mustang GT
2026	NTI Townsville 500	2	(New Zealand) Matthew Payne	Grove Racing	Ford Mustang GT
2026	NTI Townsville 500	3	(Australia) Brodie Kostecki	Dick Johnson Racing	Ford Mustang GT

Notes

- ^1 – In 2020 and 2021, Townsville hosted two consecutive rounds of the Supercars Championship.

== Multiple winners ==
=== By driver ===
Race Wins	Driver
12	(Australia) Jamie Whincup
10	(New Zealand) Shane van Gisbergen
4	(New Zealand) Scott McLaughlin
4	(Australia) Cam Waters
3	(Australia) Garth Tander
3	(Australia) Mark Winterbottom
2	(Australia) Broc Feeney
2	(New Zealand) Matthew Payne
2	(Australia) Brodie Kostecki
1	(Australia) James Courtney
1	(Australia) Will Davison
1	(Australia) Will Brown
1	(Australia) Anton De Pasquale

=== By team ===
Race Wins	Team
24	Triple Eight Race Engineering
8	Tickford Racing^{2}
8	Dick Johnson Racing^{3}
3	Holden Racing Team
2	Grove Racing
1	Erebus Motorsport

=== By manufacturer ===
Race Wins	Manufacturer
24	Holden
19	Ford
3	Chevrolet

Notes

- ^2 – Tickford Racing was known as Ford Performance Racing from 2003 to 2014 and as Prodrive Racing Australia from 2015 to 2017, hence their statistics are combined.
- ^3 – Dick Johnson Racing was known as DJR Team Penske from 2015 to 2020, hence their statistics are combined.

== Event names and sponsors ==
- 2009: Dunlop Townsville 400
- 2010–13: Sucrogen Townsville 400
- 2014: Castrol Townsville 500 – Driven by TAFE Queensland
- 2015–16: Castrol Edge Townsville 400
- 2017–19: Watpac Townsville 400
- 2020: NTI Townsville SuperSprint^{1}
- 2020: Robson Civil Projects Townsville SuperSprint^{1}
- 2021–present: NTI Townsville 500^{1}
- 2021: WD-40 Townsville SuperSprint^{1}

== See also ==
- List of Australian Touring Car Championship races
