= Jaxon Evans =

New Zealand racing driver

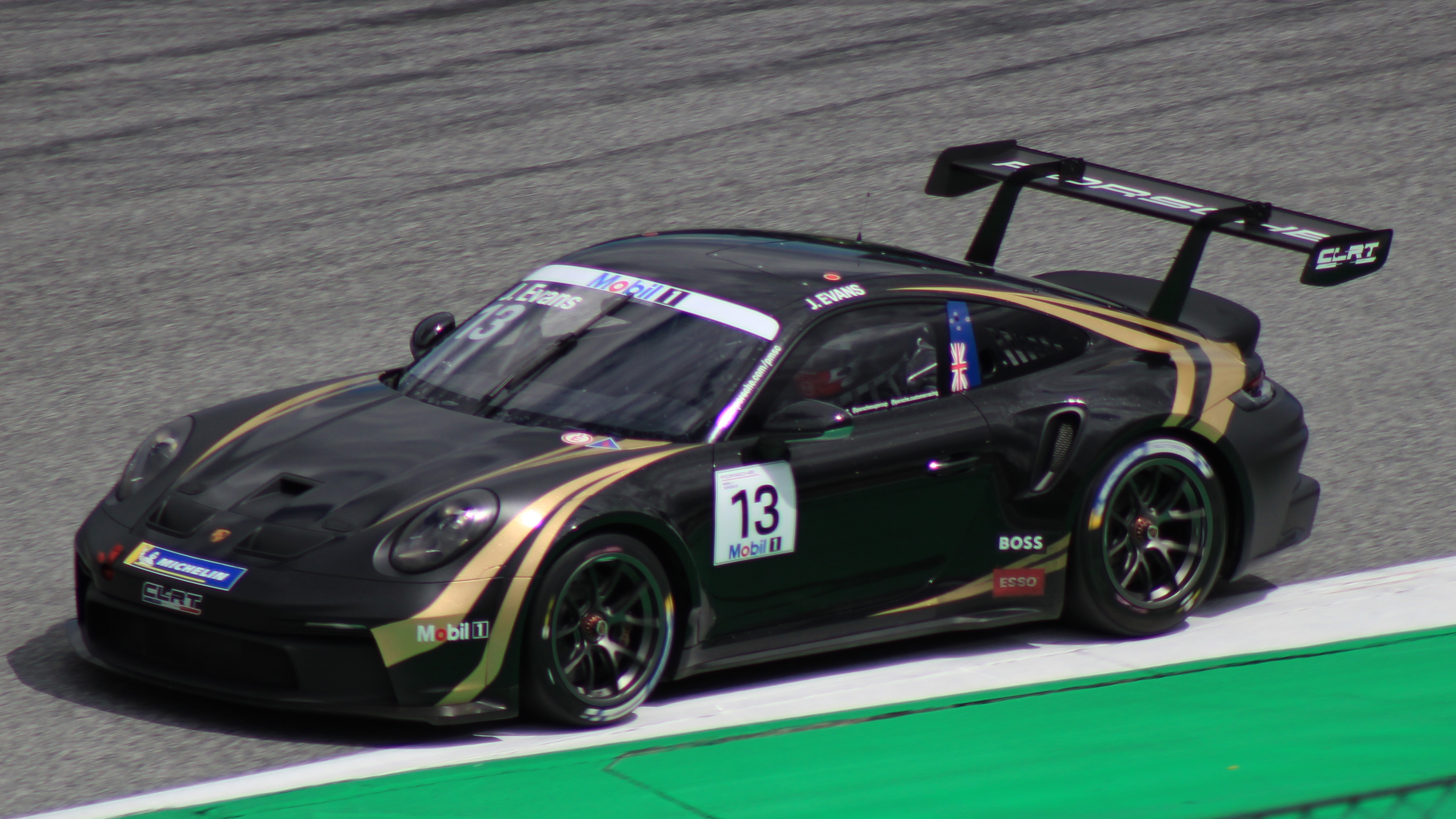
- Evans in 2022
- Nationality: New Zealander
- Born: Jaxon John Evans; 19 September 1996 (age 30) Levin, New Zealand
- Relatives: Jono Lester (adopted cousin)

Supercars Championship career
- Debut season: 2022
- Current team: Walkinshaw TWG Racing
- Categorisation: FIA Silver (until 2021); FIA Gold (2022–)
- Car number: 2
- Former teams: Brad Jones Racing
- Starts: 58
- Wins: 0
- Podiums: 1
- Poles: 0
- Fastest laps: 0

Previous series
- 2015–18 2015–18: Carrera Cup Australia; Australian GT Championship

Championship titles
- 2020 2018: Porsche Carrera Cup France; Porsche Carrera Cup Australia

Jaxon John Evans (born 19 September 1996) is a New Zealand racing driver who last competed in the Supercars Championship for Brad Jones Racing. He previously competed in the FIA World Endurance Championship.

== Career ==
After several years spent in karting, Evans began his sports car racing career in 2015, competing for McElrea Racing in the then-Porsche GT3 Cup Challenge Australia. In his opening season of competition, Evans finished second in the B Class, before stepping up to the overall championship for 2016. After trading blows with Hamish Hardeman for most of the season, Evans would ultimately fall short of the title after a retirement at Winton established an eventual 19 point gap between the two.

2017 marked a series of changes for Evans, as he embarked upon a dual full season effort with Jamec Pem Racing in the Australian Endurance Championship and a debut in the Porsche Carrera Cup Australia. Evans and co-driver Tim Miles scored victories in two of the four races that season, including the opener at Phillip Island, but would finish second in the championship. In the Carrera Cup, Evans scored five victories en route to a fifth-place points finish. The following season, Evans was crowned series champion, awarding him with the opportunity to compete at the Porsche Junior Programme Shootout at the end of the 2018 calendar year. At the program's conclusion, Evans was announced as the victor, being offered a €225,000 scholarship and a ride in the 2019 Porsche Supercup. Evans signed with Swiss team Fach Auto Tech, tallying two podiums and finishing seventh in the overall standings.

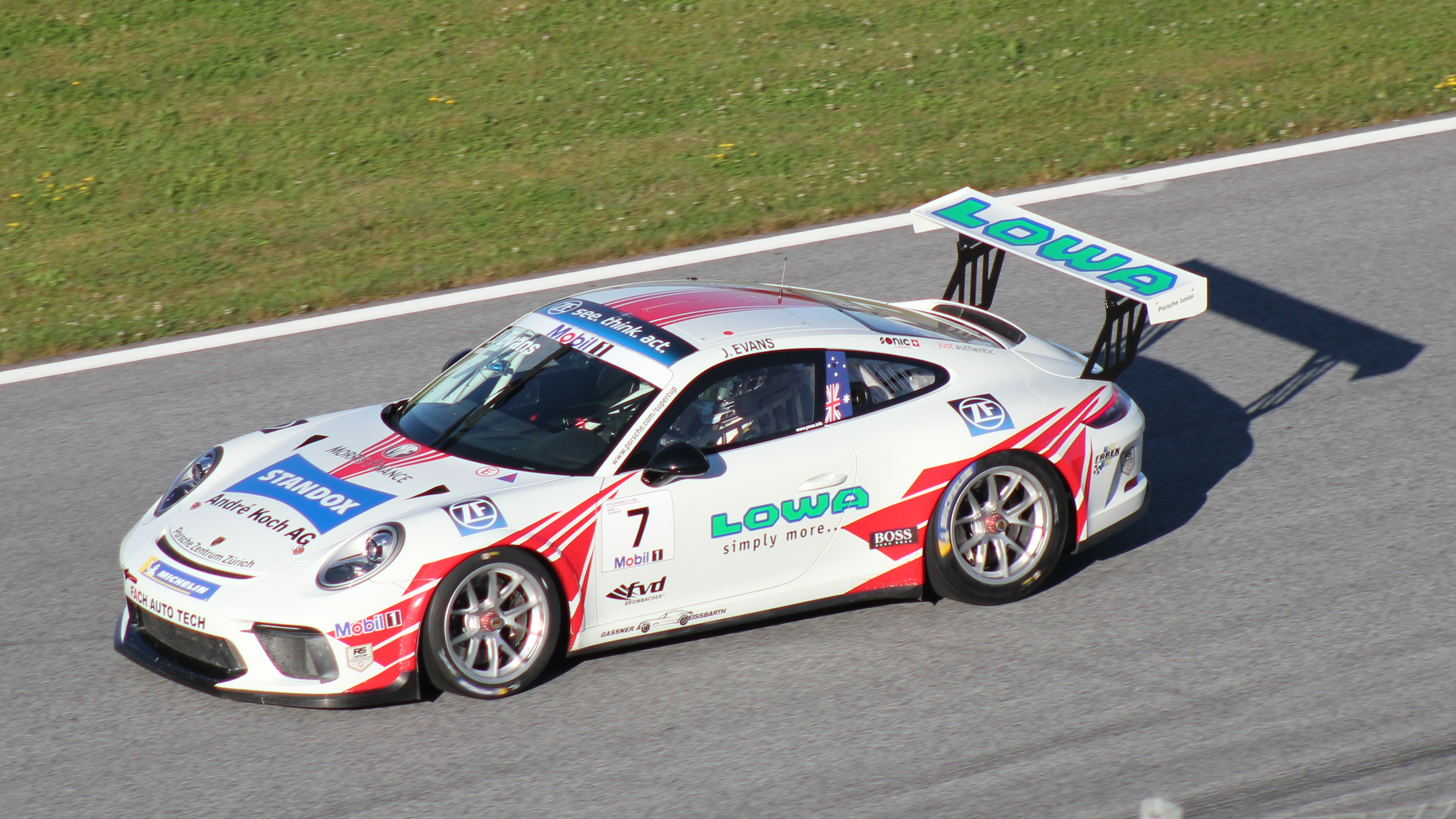
Evans competing in the Porsche Supercup in 2019

In 2020, competing for BWT Lechner Racing, Evans won the Porsche Carrera Cup France. Just weeks later, he was offered his first drive in the FIA World Endurance Championship with Dempsey-Proton Racing, sharing the No. 88 with Khaled Al Qubaisi and Marco Holzer. For the 2021 FIA World Endurance Championship season, Evans would compete for the team full-time, partnering with Matt Campbell and Christian Ried in the No. 77.

The 2023 season saw Evans take on the IMSA SportsCar Championship's Michelin Endurance Cup, driving in the GTD class for the Kelly-Moss with Riley Motorsports operation. Evans also embarked on a full-time effort in the ADAC GT Masters, driving for German team Huber Racing alongside Tim Zimmermann.

== Personal life ==
Evans was born in New Zealand to Fijian parents from the remote Rotuma island group, but was adopted at birth by John and Debbie Evans. Debbie (née Lester) competed in Formula Vee and Formula Ford between 1985 and 2001, and is the aunt of fellow racing driver Jono Lester.

== Racing record ==
=== Karting career summary ===
Season	Series	Position
2012	Australian Rotax Nationals - Rotax Junior	6th
2014	New Zealand ProKart Series - KZ2	**2nd**

=== Racing career summary ===
Season	Series	Team	Races	Wins	Poles	F/Laps	Podiums	Points	Position
2015	Porsche GT3 Cup Challenge Australia	McElrea Racing	18	0	0	0	0	100	13th
2015	Australian GT Championship - GT Trophy	McElrea Racing	2	0	0	0	2	126	12th
2016	Porsche GT3 Cup Challenge Australia	Simulate-It/Willship	18	9	4	9	16	471	**2nd**
2016	Toyota Finance 86 Championship	Stealth Motorsport	9	0	0	1	0	340	12th
2016	Australian GT Championship	McElrea Racing	2	0	0	0	0	0	NC
2016	Australian Endurance Championship	McElrea Racing	1	0	0	0	0	0	NC
2017	Australian Endurance Championship	Jamec Pem Racing	4	2	0	1	3	598	**2nd**
2017	Porsche Carrera Cup Australia	McElrea Racing	23	5	0	2	7	879.5	5th
2018	Porsche Carrera Cup Australia	McElrea Racing	24	6	1	7	17	1114	**1st**
2018	Australian GT Championship	McElrea Racing	1	0	0	0	0	185	30th
2019	Porsche Carrera Cup Germany	Team Project 1 - JBR	15	0	1	1	3	139	6th
2019	Porsche Supercup	Fach Auto Tech	10	0	1	1	2	83	7th
2019	VLN Series - AT	Care for Climate	1	0	0	0	1	5	11th
2019	Intercontinental GT Challenge	Competition Motorsports	1	0	0	0	0	0	NC
2020	Porsche Carrera Cup France	BWT Lechner Racing	10	2	0	3	7	139	**1st**
2020	Porsche Supercup	BWT Lechner Racing	8	1	1	1	3	108	4th
2020	Intercontinental GT Challenge	Earl Bamber Motorsport	1	0	0	0	0	4	19th
2020	FIA World Endurance Championship - GTE Am	Dempsey-Proton Racing	1	0	0	1	1	23	21st
2021	FIA World Endurance Championship - GTE Am	Dempsey-Proton Racing	6	0	0	1	2	79	**3rd**
2021	European Le Mans Series - LMGTE	Dempsey-Proton Racing	2	0	1	0	1	23	18th
2021	Porsche Supercup	martinet by Alméras	8	1	1	0	3	111	**2nd**
2021	Porsche Carrera Cup France	martinet by Alméras	2	1	0	0	2	0	NC
2022	ADAC GT Masters	ID-Racing	4	0	0	0	0	18	29th
2022	GT World Challenge Europe Endurance Cup	Herberth Motorsport	1	0	0	0	0	0	NC
2022	Porsche Supercup	CLRT	1	0	0	0	0	0	NC†
2022	Supercars Championship	Brad Jones Racing	1	0	0	0	0	0	NC
2022	24 Hours of Nürburgring - SP9	Falken Motorsports	1	0	0	0	0	N/A	9th
2023	GT World Challenge Europe Endurance Cup	Team Parker Racing	1	0	0	0	0	0	NC
2023	IMSA SportsCar Championship - GTD	Kelly-Moss with Riley	3	0	0	0	0	581	39th
2023	Supercars Championship	Brad Jones Racing	2	0	0	0	0	186	47th
2023	ADAC GT Masters	Huber Racing	6	1	1	1	2	91	8th
2024	Supercars Championship	Brad Jones Racing	23	0	0	0	0	1075	23rd
2024	Intercontinental GT Challenge	Phantom Global Racing	2	0	0	0	1	15	16th
2024	GT World Challenge Asia	Phantom Global Racing	4	0	0	?	0	1	43rd
2024	GT World Challenge Europe Endurance Cup	Phantom Global Racing	1	0	0	0	0	4	27th
2024	GT World Challenge Australia - Pro-Am	Arise Racing GT	10	1	2	1	4	126	**3rd**
2025	Supercars Championship	Brad Jones Racing	32	0	0	0	0	855	23rd
2025	GT World Challenge Australia - Pro-Am	Arise Racing GT	12	4	4	0	8	207	**2nd**
2025	Intercontinental GT Challenge	Arise Racing GT	1	0	0	0	0	4	30th
2026	Supercars Championship	Walkinshaw TWG Racing	2	0	0	0	1	0	NC
2026	Toyota Gazoo Racing Australia GR Cup	Toyota Gazoo Racing Australia							
2026	GT World Challenge Australia - Pro-Am	ARGT							
2026	Intercontinental GT Challenge	ARGT	1	0	0	0	0	4	28th
2026	GT World Challenge Asia	Audi Sport Asia Team Phantom	11	1	1	0	3	66	12th
2026	IMSA SportsCar Championship - GTD	Inception Racing	1	0	0	0	0	130	80th
2026	Shanghai 8 Hours	Phantom Global Racing	1	0	0	0	0	N/A	24th

† As he was a guest driver, Evans was ineligible to score points.

^{*} Season still in progress.

=== Complete Porsche Supercup results ===
(key) (Races in bold indicate pole position) (Races in italics indicate fastest lap)

Year	Team	1	2	3	4	5	6	7	8	9	10	Pos.	Points
2019	Fach Auto Tech	CAT; 8	MON; 9	RBR; 9	SIL; 5	HOC; 10	HUN; 11	SPA; 3	**MNZ**; **6**	MEX; 14	MEX; 3	6th	87
2020	BWT Lechner Racing	**RBR**; **1**	RBR; 5	HUN; 20	SIL; 3	SIL; 8	CAT; 2	SPA; 4	MNZ; 5			4th	108
2021	Martinet by Alméras	MON; 2	RBR; 6	RBR; 1	HUN; 2	SPA; 12	ZND; 10	MNZ; 4	MNZ; 7			**2nd**	**110**
2022	CLRT	IMO	MON	SIL	RBR; 8	LEC	SPA	ZND	MNZ			N/C	-

=== Complete FIA World Endurance Championship results ===
(key) (Races in bold indicate pole position; races in italics indicate fastest lap)

Year	Entrant	Class	Chassis	Engine	1	2	3	4	5	6	7	8	Rank	Points
2019–20	Dempsey-Proton Racing	LMGTE Am	Porsche 911 RSR	Porsche 4.0L Flat-6	SIL	FUJ	SHA	BHR	COA	SPA	LMS	BHR; 3	21st	23
2021	Dempsey-Proton Racing	LMGTE Am	Porsche 911 RSR-19	Porsche 4.2 L Flat-6	SPA; Ret	ALG; Ret	MNZ; 5	LMS; 4	BHR; 2	BHR; 2			3rd	79

=== Complete WeatherTech SportsCar Championship results ===
(key) (Races in bold indicate pole position; results in italics indicate fastest lap)

Year	Team	Class	Make	Engine	1	2	3	4	5	6	7	8	9	10	11	Pos.	Points
2023	Kelly-Moss with Riley	GTD	Porsche 911 GT3 R (992)	Porsche 4.2 L Flat-6	DAY; 16	SEB; 7	LBH	LGA	WGL; 17	MOS	LIM	ELK	VIR	IMS	PET	39th	628
2026	Inception Racing	GTD	Ferrari 296 GT3 Evo	Ferrari F163CE 3.0 L Turbo V6	DAY	SEB	LBH	LGA	WGL; 18	MOS	ELK	VIR	IMS	PET		80th	130

=== Complete 24 Hours of Le Mans results ===
Year	Team	Co-Drivers	Car	Class	Laps	Pos.	Class Pos.
2021	(Germany) Dempsey-Proton Racing	(Germany) Christian Ried (Australia) Matt Campbell	Porsche 911 RSR-19	GTE; Am	335	31st	5th

=== Complete Bathurst 12 Hour results ===
Year	Team	Co-Drivers	Car	Class	Laps	Pos.	Class Pos.
2018	(Australia) Objective Racing	(Australia) Tony Walls (Australia) Tim Slade (Australia) Warren Luff	McLaren 650S GT3	APP	260	DNF	DNF
2019	(United States) Competition Motorsports (Australia) McElrea Racing	(Australia) David Calvert-Jones (France) Kévin Estre	Porsche 911 GT3 R	APA	37	DNF	DNF
2020	(New Zealand) Earl Bamber Motorsport	(Australia) David Calvert-Jones (France) Romain Dumas	Porsche 911 GT3 R	A-GT3; Pro/Am	311	11th	**2nd**
2024	(China) Phantom Global Racing / (Germany) Team75	(Denmark) Bastian Buus (Sweden) Joel Eriksson	Porsche 911 GT3 R (992)	A-GT3; Pro	275	4th	4th
2025	(Australia) Arise Racing GT	(Italy) Alessio Rovera (Australia) Brad Schumacher (Australia) Elliot Schutte	Ferrari 296 GT3	Pro-Am	303	8th	**1st**
2026	(Australia) Arise Racing GT	(Italy) Davide Rigon (Brazil) Daniel Serra	Ferrari 296 GT3	Pro	262	9th	7th

=== GT World Challenge Australia results ===
(key) (Races in bold indicate pole position) (Races in italics indicate fastest lap)

Year	Team	Car	Class	1	2	3	4	5	6	7	8	9	10	11	12	Pos.	Points
2024	Arise Racing	Ferrari 296 GT3	Pro-Am	**PHI1**; **1**; **2**	PHI1; 2; 7	BEN; 1; 3	**BEN**; **2**; **3**	QUE; 1; 4	QUE; 2; 6	PHI2; 1; 7	PHI2; 2; 1	BAT; 1; 6	BAT; 2; 4			3rd	126
2025	Arise Racing	Ferrari 296 GT3	Pro-Am	**PHI**; **1**; **1**	PHI; 2; 3	SYD; 1; 1	SYD; 2; 1	QLD; 1; 3	QLD; 2; 5	**SAN**; **1**; **1**	SAN; 2; 3	BEN; 1; 2	BEN; 2; 4	HAM; 2; 4	HAM; 2; 7	2nd	207
2026	ARGT	Ferrari 296 GT3	Pro-Am	PHI; 1; 5	PHI; 2; 2	BEN; 1; 3	BEN; 2; 5	QLD; 1; 8	QLD; 2; 3	HID; 1 Ret	HID; 2; 6	SYD; 1; 4	SYD; 2; 6	ADL; 1	ADL; 2	5th*	100*

=== Supercars Championship results ===
Supercars results
Year	Team	No.	Car	1	2	3	4	5	6	7	8	9	10	11	12	13	14	15	16	17	18	19	20	21	22	23	24	25	26	27	28	29	30	31	32	33	34	35	36	37	Position	Points
2022	Brad Jones Racing	4	Holden ZB Commodore	SYD; R1	SYD; R2	SYM; R6	SYM; R7	SYM; R8	MEL; R6	MEL; R7	MEL; R8	MEL; R9	WAN; R10	WAN; R11	WAN; R12	WIN; R13	WIN; R14	WIN; R15	HID; R16	HID; R17	HID; R18	TOW; R19	TOW; R20	BEN; R21	BEN; R22	BEN; R23	SAN; R24	SAN; R25	SAN; R26	PUK; R27	PUK; R28	PUK; R29	BAT; R30; Ret	SUR; R31	SUR; R32	ADE; R33	ADE; R34				NC	0
2023	Brad Jones Racing	4	Chevrolet Camaro ZL1	NEW; R1	NEW; R2	MEL; R3	MEL; R4	MEL; R5	MEL; R6	BAR; R7	BAR; R8	BAR; R9	SYM; R10	SYM; R11	SYM; R12	HID; R13	HID; R14	HID; R15	TOW; R16	TOW; R17	SMP; R18	SMP; R19	BEN; R20	BEN; R21	BEN; R22	SAN; R23; 18	BAT; R24; 21	SUR; R25	SUR; R26	ADE; R27	ADE; R28										47th	174
2024	Brad Jones Racing	12	Chevrolet Camaro ZL1	BAT1; R1; 20	BAT1; R2; 21	MEL; R3; 24	MEL; R4; 18	MEL; R5; 18	MEL; R6; 18	TAU; R7; 10	TAU; R8; 14	BAR; R9; 18	BAR; R10; 18	HID; R11; 21	HID; R12; 11	TOW; R13; 22	TOW; R14; 21	SMP; R15; 18	SMP; R16; 20	SYM; R17; 24	SYM; R18; Ret	SAN; R19; 22	BAT; R20; 20	SUR; R21; 17	SUR; R22; 15	ADE; R23; 19	ADE; R24; DNS														23rd	1075
2025	Brad Jones Racing	12	Chevrolet Camaro ZL1	SYD; R1; 16	SYD; R2; 10	SYD; R3; 19	MEL; R4; 18	MEL; R5; 18	MEL; R6; 18	MEL; R7; C	TAU; R8; 18	TAU; R9; 19	TAU; R10; 14	SYM; R11; 7	SYM; R12; 8	SYM; R13; 11	BAR; R14; 18	BAR; R15; Ret	BAR; R16; 12	HID; R17; Ret	HID; R18; DNS	HID; R19; DNS	TOW; R20; Ret	TOW; R21; Ret	TOW; R22; 17	QLD; R23; 11	QLD; R24; Ret	QLD; R25; 15	BEN; R26; 18	BAT; R27; Ret	SUR; R28; Ret	SUR; R29; 14	SAN; R30; 21	SAN; R31; 15	ADE; R32; 13	ADE; R33; 19	ADE; R34; 18				23rd	855
2026	Walkinshaw TWG Racing	2	Toyota GR Supra	SMP; R1	SMP; R2	SMP; R3	MEL; R4	MEL; R5	MEL; R6	MEL; R7	TAU; R8	TAU; R9	TAU; R10	CHR; R11	CHR; R12	CHR; R13	SYM; R14	SYM; R15	SYM; R16	BAR; R17	BAR; R18	BAR; R19	HID; R20	HID; R21	HID; R22	TOW; R23	TOW; R24	TOW; R25	QLD; R26	QLD; R27	QLD; R28	BEN; R29; 3	BAT; R30; 24	SUR; R31	SUR; R32	SAN; R33	SAN; R34	ADE; R35	ADE; R36	ADE; R37		

=== Complete Bathurst 1000 results ===
Year	Team	Car	Co-driver	Position	Laps
2022	Brad Jones Racing	Holden Commodore ZB	(Australia) Jack Smith	DNF	138
2023	Brad Jones Racing	Chevrolet Camaro Mk.6	(Australia) Jack Smith	21st	157
2024	Brad Jones Racing	Chevrolet Camaro Mk.6	(Australia) Dean Fiore	20th	161
2025	Brad Jones Racing	Chevrolet Camaro Mk.6	(Australia) Jack Smith	DNF	129
2026	Walkinshaw TWG Racing	Toyota GR Supra	(New Zealand) Ryan Wood	24th	145

Sporting positions
Preceded by David Wall	Porsche Carrera Cup Australia; Champion; 2018	Succeeded by Jordan Love
Preceded by Ayhancan Güven	Porsche Carrera Cup France; Champion; 2020	Succeeded by Marvin Klein
