= 2026 Perth Super 440 =

(Western Australia) 2026 Bosch Power Tools Perth Super 440
Event Information
- Round 8 of 14 in the 2026 Supercars Championship
- Layout of Wanneroo Raceway
- Date: 31 July - 2 August 2026
- Location: Wanneroo, Western Australia
- Venue: Wanneroo Raceway

Results
Race 1
Distance	50 laps	120 km
Pole position	(New Zealand) Matt Payne; Grove Racing	54.048
Winner	(New Zealand) Matt Payne; Grove Racing	50:52.273
Race 2
Distance	50 laps	120 km
Pole position	(New Zealand) Matt Payne; Grove Racing	54.067
Winner	(Australia) Broc Feeney; Triple Eight Race Engineering	46:58.863
Race 3
Distance	80 laps	200 km
Pole position	(Australia) Broc Feeney; Triple Eight Race Engineering	53.648
Winner	(New Zealand) Matt Payne; Grove Racing	1:15:44.299
Round Results
First	(New Zealand) Matt Payne; Grove Racing	294 pts
Second	(Australia) Broc Feeney; Triple Eight Race Engineering	268 pts
Third	(Australia) Kai Allen; Grove Racing	226 pts

The 2026 Perth Super 440 (known for commercial purposes as the 2026 Bosch Power Tools Perth Super 440) was a motor racing event held as a part of the 2026 Supercars Championship from Friday 31 July to Sunday 2 August 2026. The event was held at Wanneroo Raceway in Wanneroo, Western Australia. It was the eighth round of the 2026 Supercars Championship and consisted of two races of 120 kilometers and one race with refueling of 200 kilometers.

== Support Series ==
=== Radical Cup Australia ===
==== Qualifying ====
Pos.	No.	Driver	Time
1	54	Mason Harvey	55.440
2	8	Chris Reindler	+0.111
3	31	Peter Paddon	+0.202

==== Race 1 (20 mins) ====
Pos.	No.	Driver	Time
1	54	Mason Harvey	17:29.091
2	8	Bryce Moore	+1.042
3	11	Isaac McNeill	+1.973

==== Race 2 (20 mins) ====
Pos.	No.	Driver	Time
1	8	Chris Reindler	16:11.985
2	11	Isaac McNeill	+0.954
3	31	Peter Paddon	+2.743

==== Race 3 (20 mins) ====
Pos.	No.	Driver	Time
1	31	Peter Paddon	19:00.704
2	8	Bryce Moore	+0.643
3	11	Isaac McNeill	+0.842

==== Race 4 (20 mins) ====
Pos.	No.	Driver	Time
1	8	Chris Reindler	18:59.540
2	11	Isaac McNeill	+0.634
3	31	Peter Paddon	+4.219

=== V8 SuperUtes ===
==== Qualifying ====
Pos.	No.	Driver	Time
1	1	David Sieders	1:03.646
2	15	Adam Marjoram	+0.531
3	4	Aaron Borg	+0.669

==== Race 1 (20 mins) ====
Pos.	No.	Driver	Time
1	1	David Sieders	18:39.044
2	15	Adam Marjoram	+0.322
3	41	Adrian Cottrell	+2.100

==== Race 2 (25 mins) ====
Pos.	No.	Driver	Time
1	28	Anthony Jewell	24:31.229
2	33	Sean Evans	+0.928
3	15	Adam Marjoram	+2.698

Note: Anthony Jewell was later penalised for illegal tire warming

==== Race 3 (20 mins) ====
Pos.	No.	Driver	Time
1	15	Adam Marjoram	19:29.164
2	1	David Sieders	+1.033
3	41	Adrian Cottrell	+1.586

==== Race 4 (20 mins) ====
Pos.	No.	Driver	Time
1	15	Adam Marjoram	19:25.272
2	1	David Sieders	+3.521
3	7	Grant Johnson	+4.919

=== Trans Am ===
No results available.

=== Super2 Series ===
==== Qualifying (including top 5 shootout) ====
Pos.	No.	Driver	Time
1	26	Aaron Love	19:25.272
2	43	Lochie Dalton	+3.521
3	5	Ben Gomersall	+4.919

==== Race 1 (40 mins) ====
Pos.	No.	Driver	Time
1	43	Lochie Dalton	39:17.709
2	26	Aaron Love	+2.274
3	5	Ben Gomersall	+2.942

==== Race 2 (40 mins) ====
Pos.	No.	Driver	Time
1	55	Reuben Goodall	39:13.004
2	55	Nash Morris	+0.640
3	26	Aaron Love	+2.916

== Results ==
=== Race 1 ===
Pos.	No.	Driver	Team	Car	Laps	Time/Retired	Grid	Pts
1	19	(New Zealand) Matt Payne	Grove Racing	Ford Mustang S650	50	50:52.273	1	80
2	2	(New Zealand) Ryan Wood	Walkinshaw TWG Racing	Toyota GR Supra	50			74
3	18	(Australia) Anton De Pasquale	Team 18	Chevrolet Camaro ZL1	50			68
4	6	(Australia) Cam Waters	Tickford Racing	Ford Mustang S650	50			62
5	1	(Australia) Chaz Mostert	Walkinshaw TWG Racing	Toyota GR Supra	50			57
6	26	(Australia) Kai Allen	Grove Racing	Ford Mustang S650	50			53
7	88	(Australia) Broc Feeney	Triple Eight Race Engineering	Ford Mustang S650	50			54
8	8	(New Zealand) Andre Heimgartner	Brad Jones Racing	Toyota GR Supra	50			45
9	55	(Australia) Thomas Randle	Tickford Racing	Ford Mustang S650	50			41
10	38	(Australia) Rylan Gray	Dick Johnson Racing	Ford Mustang S650	50			38
11	4	(Australia) Jack Le Brocq	Matt Stone Racing	Chevrolet Camaro ZL1	50			35
12	888	(Australia) Will Brown	Triple Eight Race Engineering	Ford Mustang S650	50			32
13	99	(Australia) Cooper Murray	Erebus Motorsport	Chevrolet Camaro ZL1	50			29
14	14	(Australia) Cameron Hill	Brad Jones Racing	Toyota GR Supra	50			27
15	7	(Australia) James Golding	Blanchard Racing Team	Ford Mustang S650	50			25
16	3	(Australia) Aaron Cameron	Blanchard Racing Team	Ford Mustang S650	50			23
17	11	(Australia) Jackson Walls	Triple Eight Race Engineering	Ford Mustang S650	50			21
18	9	(Australia) Jobe Stewart	Erebus Motorsport	Chevrolet Camaro ZL1	50			19
19	20	(Australia) David Reynolds	Team 18	Chevrolet Camaro ZL1	50			18
20	31	(Australia) Jayden Ojeda	PremiAir Racing	Chevrolet Camaro ZL1	50			16
21	777	(Australia) Declan Fraser	PremiAir Racing	Chevrolet Camaro ZL1	50			15
22	10	(Australia) Zach Bates	Matt Stone Racing	Chevrolet Camaro ZL1	50			14
23	96	(Australia) Macauley Jones	Brad Jones Racing	Toyota GR Supra	49			13
24	17	(Australia) Brodie Kostecki	Dick Johnson Racing	Ford Mustang S650	47			12
Fastest Lap: Broc Feeney (Triple Eight Race Engineering) - 55.2829 on lap 31

=== Race 2 ===
Pos.	No.	Driver	Team	Car	Laps	Time/Retired	Grid	Pts
1	88	(Australia) Broc Feeney	Triple Eight Race Engineering	Ford Mustang S650	50	46:58.8626	1	85
2	19	(New Zealand) Matt Payne	Grove Racing	Ford Mustang S650	50			74
3	26	(Australia) Kai Allen	Grove Racing	Ford Mustang S650	50			68
4	1	(Australia) Chaz Mostert	Walkinshaw TWG Racing	Toyota GR Supra	50			62
5	888	(Australia) Will Brown	Triple Eight Race Engineering	Ford Mustang S650	50			57
6	17	(Australia) Brodie Kostecki	Dick Johnson Racing	Ford Mustang S650	50			53
7	8	(New Zealand) Andre Heimgartner	Brad Jones Racing	Toyota GR Supra	50			49
8	2	(New Zealand) Ryan Wood	Walkinshaw TWG Racing	Toyota GR Supra	50			45
9	6	(Australia) Cam Waters	Tickford Racing	Ford Mustang S650	50			41
10	55	(Australia) Thomas Randle	Tickford Racing	Ford Mustang S650	50			38
11	18	(Australia) Anton De Pasquale	Team 18	Chevrolet Camaro ZL1	50			35
12	777	(Australia) Declan Fraser	PremiAir Racing	Chevrolet Camaro ZL1	50			32
13	4	(Australia) Jack Le Brocq	Matt Stone Racing	Chevrolet Camaro ZL1	50			29
14	7	(Australia) James Golding	Blanchard Racing Team	Ford Mustang S650	50			27
15	20	(Australia) David Reynolds	Team 18	Chevrolet Camaro ZL1	50			25
16	9	(Australia) Jobe Stewart	Erebus Motorsport	Chevrolet Camaro ZL1	50			23
17	38	(Australia) Rylan Gray	Dick Johnson Racing	Ford Mustang S650	50			21
18	31	(Australia) Jayden Ojeda	PremiAir Racing	Chevrolet Camaro ZL1	50			19
19	99	(Australia) Cooper Murray	Erebus Motorsport	Chevrolet Camaro ZL1	50			18
20	14	(Australia) Cameron Hill	Brad Jones Racing	Toyota GR Supra	50			16
21	3	(Australia) Aaron Cameron	Blanchard Racing Team	Ford Mustang S650	50			15
22	10	(Australia) Zach Bates	Matt Stone Racing	Chevrolet Camaro ZL1	50			14
23	96	(Australia) Macauley Jones	Brad Jones Racing	Toyota GR Supra	50			13
24	11	(Australia) Jackson Walls	Triple Eight Race Engineering	Ford Mustang S650	50			12
Fastest Lap: Broc Feeney (Triple Eight Race Engineering) - 55.1510 on lap 30

=== Race 3 ===
Pos.	No.	Driver	Team	Car	Laps	Time/Retired	Grid	Pts
1	19	(New Zealand) Matt Payne	Grove Racing	Ford Mustang S650	80	1:15:44.2993		140
2	88	(Australia) Broc Feeney	Triple Eight Race Engineering	Ford Mustang S650	80		1	129
3	18	(Australia) Anton De Pasquale	Team 18	Chevrolet Camaro ZL1	80			118
4	6	(Australia) Cam Waters	Tickford Racing	Ford Mustang S650	80			109
5	26	(Australia) Kai Allen	Grove Racing	Ford Mustang S650	80			105
6	1	(Australia) Chaz Mostert	Walkinshaw TWG Racing	Toyota GR Supra	80			92
7	3	(Australia) Aaron Cameron	Blanchard Racing Team	Ford Mustang S650	80			85
8	31	(Australia) Jayden Ojeda	PremiAir Racing	Chevrolet Camaro ZL1	80			78
9	20	(Australia) David Reynolds	Team 18	Chevrolet Camaro ZL1	80			72
10	55	(Australia) Thomas Randle	Tickford Racing	Ford Mustang S650	80			66
11	8	(New Zealand) Andre Heimgartner	Brad Jones Racing	Toyota GR Supra	80			61
12	17	(Australia) Brodie Kostecki	Dick Johnson Racing	Ford Mustang S650	80			56
13	99	(Australia) Cooper Murray	Erebus Motorsport	Chevrolet Camaro ZL1	80			51
14	7	(Australia) James Golding	Blanchard Racing Team	Ford Mustang S650	80			47
15	4	(Australia) Jack Le Brocq	Matt Stone Racing	Chevrolet Camaro ZL1	80			44
16	777	(Australia) Declan Fraser	PremiAir Racing	Chevrolet Camaro ZL1	80			40
17	888	(Australia) Will Brown	Triple Eight Race Engineering	Ford Mustang S650	80			37
18	9	(Australia) Jobe Stewart	Erebus Motorsport	Chevrolet Camaro ZL1	80			34
19	14	(Australia) Cameron Hill	Brad Jones Racing	Toyota GR Supra	80			31
20	11	(Australia) Jackson Walls	Triple Eight Race Engineering	Ford Mustang S650	79			29
21	96	(Australia) Macauley Jones	Brad Jones Racing	Toyota GR Supra	79			26
22	10	(Australia) Zach Bates	Matt Stone Racing	Chevrolet Camaro ZL1	79			24
23	38	(Australia) Rylan Gray	Dick Johnson Racing	Ford Mustang S650	67			22
Ret	2	(New Zealand) Ryan Wood	Walkinshaw TWG Racing	Toyota GR Supra				~~--~~
Fastest Lap: Kai Allen (Grove Racing) - 54.9478 on lap 67
