= 2026 The Bend 500 =

Motor racing event in Tailem Bend, South Australia

(South Australia) 2026 The Bend 500
Event Information
- Round 10 of 14 in the 2026 Supercars Championship
- Layout of The Bend Motorsport Park West Circuit
- Date: 11–13 September 2026
- Location: Tailem Bend, South Australia
- Venue: The Bend Motorsport Park
- Weather: Heavy rain

Results
Race 1
Distance	141 laps	480 km
Pole position	(Australia) Brodie Kostecki; Dick Johnson Racing	
Winner	(Australia) Chaz Mostert (New Zealand) Fabian Coulthard; Walkinshaw TWG Racing	

The 2026 The Bend 500 (known for commercial reasons as the 2026 AirTouch 500 at The Bend) was a motor racing event for Supercars that was held between 11 and 13 September 2026 at the The Bend Motorsport Park in the Tailem Bend, South Australia.

In a race plagued by heavy rain, Chaz Mostert and Fabian Coulthard prevailed to take victory after starting the race from outside the top ten. The inclement weather necessitated multiple safety cars and as the race went on, the drying track forced teams to gamble with tyre changes. Walkinshaw TWG Racing anticipated this correctly and along with Mostert and Coulthard claiming victory, the sister car of Ryan Wood and Jaxon Evans rounded out the podium in third place. This marked Evans' first Supercars podium in his career. Second place was claimed by Kai Allen and Tim Slade, who led a sizeable portion of the race early on.

The race was scheduled to 147 laps at a distance of 500 kilometers. However, due to the slow nature of the race as well as the intervention of multiple safety cars, the race would be deemed time-certain and would finish at 141 laps at a distance of 480 kilometers. Both Blanchard Racing Team entrants were disqualified after failing to meet the minimum required drive time for James Golding and Aaron Cameron respectively.

== Background ==
The event was held on the weekend of 11–13 September 2026. It was the first Supercars endurance event of the year, the second iteration of The Bend 500 endurance race and the eighth Supercars event to be held at The Bend Motorsport Park since the inception of the SuperSprint format in 2018.

Having utilised the International Circuit in the previous years event, The Bend 500 would be switched to the West Circuit layout for 2026. This was done in an effort to encourage more overtaking after the lukewarm reaction to the 2025 event.

=== Entry list ===
Twenty six cars were entered into the event — 9 sixth-generation Chevrolet Camaros, 12 seventh-generation Ford Mustangs and 5 Toyota Supras.

Two wildcard entries were entered for this weekend. One was from Tickford Racing that accommodated Ben Gomersall and Campbell Logan. The other was a Team 18 entry for Craig Lowndes and Bayley Hall.

== Results ==
=== Qualifying ===
Pos.	No.	Driver	Team	Car	Time
1	18	(Australia) Anton De Pasquale	Team 18	Chevrolet Camaro ZL1	1:16.2710
2	19	(New Zealand) Matt Payne	Grove Racing	Ford Mustang S650	1:16.2779
3	26	(Australia) Kai Allen	Grove Racing	Ford Mustang S650	1:16.3613
4	88	(Australia) Broc Feeney	Triple Eight Race Engineering	Ford Mustang S650	1:16.3644
5	10	(Australia) Zach Bates	Matt Stone Racing	Chevrolet Camaro ZL1	1:16.3771
6	17	(Australia) Brodie Kostecki	Dick Johnson Racing	Ford Mustang S650	1:16.4106
7	55	(Australia) Thomas Randle	Tickford Racing	Ford Mustang S650	1:16.4318
8	31	(Australia) Jayden Ojeda	PremiAir Racing	Chevrolet Camaro ZL1	1:16.4918
9	6	(Australia) Cam Waters	Tickford Racing	Ford Mustang S650	1:16.5051
10	9	(Australia) Jobe Stewart	Erebus Motorsport	Chevrolet Camaro ZL1	1:16.5085
11	1	(Australia) Chaz Mostert	Walkinshaw TWG Racing	Toyota GR Supra	1:16.5385
12	99	(Australia) Cooper Murray	Erebus Motorsport	Chevrolet Camaro ZL1	1:16.5466
13	888	(Australia) Will Brown	Triple Eight Race Engineering	Ford Mustang S650	1:16.5729
14	2	(New Zealand) Ryan Wood	Walkinshaw TWG Racing	Toyota GR Supra	1:16.5906
15	4	(Australia) Jack Le Brocq	Matt Stone Racing	Chevrolet Camaro ZL1	1:16.6164
16	20	(Australia) David Reynolds	Team 18	Chevrolet Camaro ZL1	1:16.6409
17	3	(Australia) Aaron Cameron	Blanchard Racing Team	Ford Mustang S650	1:16.6452
18	7	(Australia) James Golding	Blanchard Racing Team	Ford Mustang S650	1:16.6950
19	8	(New Zealand) Andre Heimgartner	Brad Jones Racing	Toyota GR Supra	1:16.7760
20	38	(Australia) Rylan Gray	Dick Johnson Racing	Ford Mustang S650	1:16.7769
21	11	(Australia) Jackson Walls	Triple Eight Race Engineering	Ford Mustang S650	1:16.8062
22	15	(Australia) Bayley Hall	Team 18	Chevrolet Camaro ZL1	1:16.8168
23	96	(Australia) Macauley Jones	Brad Jones Racing	Toyota GR Supra	1:16.8289
24	777	(Australia) Declan Fraser	PremiAir Racing	Chevrolet Camaro ZL1	1:16.8375
25	5	(Australia) Ben Gomersall	Tickford Racing	Ford Mustang S650	1:16.9969
26	14	(Australia) Cameron Hill	Brad Jones Racing	Toyota GR Supra	1:17.3279

=== Top ten shootout ===
Pos.	No.	Driver	Team	Car	Time
1	17	(Australia) Brodie Kostecki	Dick Johnson Racing	Ford Mustang S650	1:16.3756
2	19	(New Zealand) Matt Payne	Grove Racing	Ford Mustang S650	1:16.4492
3	6	(Australia) Cam Waters	Tickford Racing	Ford Mustang S650	1:16.6509
4	55	(Australia) Thomas Randle	Tickford Racing	Ford Mustang S650	1:16.6641
5	18	(Australia) Anton De Pasquale	Team 18	Chevrolet Camaro ZL1	1:16.7263
6	26	(Australia) Kai Allen	Grove Racing	Ford Mustang S650	1:16.7830
7	88	(Australia) Broc Feeney	Triple Eight Race Engineering	Ford Mustang S650	1:16.7929
8	10	(Australia) Zach Bates	Matt Stone Racing	Chevrolet Camaro ZL1	1:16.9905
9	9	(Australia) Jobe Stewart	Erebus Motorsport	Chevrolet Camaro ZL1	1:17.0517
10	31	(Australia) Jayden Ojeda	PremiAir Racing	Chevrolet Camaro ZL1	1:17.0733

=== Race ===
Pos.	No.	Drivers	Team	Car	Laps	Time/Retired	Grid	Points
1	1	(Australia) Chaz Mostert (New Zealand) Fabian Coulthard	Walkinshaw TWG Racing	Toyota GR Supra	141	3:36:02.6689	11	300
2	26	(Australia) Kai Allen (Australia) Tim Slade	Grove Racing	Ford Mustang S650	141	+ 18.487	6	276
3	2	(New Zealand) Ryan Wood (New Zealand) Jaxon Evans	Walkinshaw TWG Racing	Toyota GR Supra	141	+ 33.283	14	258
4	888	(Australia) Will Brown (Australia) Scott Pye	Triple Eight Race Engineering	Ford Mustang S650	141	+ 44.388	13	240
5	31	(Australia) Jayden Ojeda (Australia) David Russell	PremiAir Racing	Chevrolet Camaro ZL1	141	+ 45.697	10	222
6	19	(New Zealand) Matt Payne (Australia) Will Davison	Grove Racing	Ford Mustang S650	141	+ 47.124	2	204
7	18	(Australia) Anton De Pasquale (Australia) Lee Holdsworth	Team 18	Chevrolet Camaro ZL1	141	+ 1:00.440	5	192
8	8	(New Zealand) Andre Heimgartner (Australia) Bryce Fullwood	Brad Jones Racing	Toyota GR Supra	141	+ 1:02.461	19	180
9	38	(Australia) Rylan Gray (Australia) Tony D'Alberto	Dick Johnson Racing	Ford Mustang S650	141	+ 1:12.360	20	168
10	4	(Australia) Jack Le Brocq (Australia) Harri Jones	Matt Stone Racing	Chevrolet Camaro ZL1	141	+ 1:15.567	15	156
11	55	(Australia) Thomas Randle (Australia) Reuben Goodall	Tickford Racing	Ford Mustang S650	141	+ 1:15.693	4	144
12	10	(Australia) Zach Bates (Australia) Aaron Seton	Matt Stone Racing	Chevrolet Camaro ZL1	140	+ 1 lap	8	138
13	15	(Australia) Bayley Hall (Australia) Craig Lowndes	Team 18	Chevrolet Camaro ZL1	140	+ 1 lap	22	132
14	6	(Australia) Cam Waters (Australia) Mark Winterbottom	Tickford Racing	Ford Mustang S650	140	+ 1 lap	3	126
15	9	(Australia) Jobe Stewart (Australia) Jarrod Hughes	Erebus Motorsport	Chevrolet Camaro ZL1	140	+ 1 lap	9	120
16	17	(Australia) Brodie Kostecki (Australia) Todd Hazelwood	Dick Johnson Racing	Ford Mustang S650	140	+ 1 lap	1	114
17	14	(Australia) Cameron Hill (Australia) Brad Vaughan	Brad Jones Racing	Toyota GR Supra	140	+ 1 lap	26	108
18	99	(Australia) Cooper Murray (Australia) Lochie Dalton	Erebus Motorsport	Chevrolet Camaro ZL1	140	+ 1 lap	12	102
19	11	(Australia) Jackson Walls (Australia) Jack Perkins	Triple Eight Race Engineering	Ford Mustang S650	140	+ 1 lap	21	96
20	96	(Australia) Macauley Jones (Australia) Jordan Boys	Brad Jones Racing	Toyota GR Supra	140	+ 1 lap	23	90
21	5	(Australia) Ben Gomersall (Australia) Campbell Logan	Tickford Racing	Ford Mustang S650	140	+ 1 lap	25	84
22	20	(Australia) David Reynolds (Australia) James Courtney	Team 18	Chevrolet Camaro ZL1	139	+ 2 laps	16	78
23	88	(Australia) Broc Feeney (Australia) Nick Percat	Triple Eight Race Engineering	Ford Mustang S650	138	+ 3 laps	7	72
NC	777	(Australia) Declan Fraser (Australia) Nash Morris	PremiAir Racing	Chevrolet Camaro ZL1	137	+ 6 laps	24	60
DSQ	7	(Australia) James Golding (New Zealand) Richie Stanaway	Blanchard Racing Team	Ford Mustang S650	141	Disqualified	18	
DSQ	3	(Australia) Aaron Cameron (Australia) Zak Best	Blanchard Racing Team	Ford Mustang S650	137	Disqualified	17	
Fastest lap set by Will Brown - 1:18.0402 on Lap 127
