= 2026 Adelaide Grand Final =

Motor racing event in South Australia, Australia

(South Australia) 2026 Adelaide Grand Final
Event Information
- Round 14 of 14 in the 2026 Supercars Championship
- Layout of the Adelaide Park Lands Circuit
- Date: 26-29 November 2026
- Location: Adelaide, South Australia
- Venue: Adelaide Street Circuit

Results
Race 1
| Distance | 32 laps | 100 km |
Race 2
| Distance | 78 laps | 250 km |
Race 3
| Distance | 78 laps | 250 km |

The 2026 Adelaide Grand Final (known for commercial reasons as the 2026 BP Adelaide Grand Final) is an upcoming motor racing event for Supercars that will be held on 26–29 November 2026 at the Adelaide Street Circuit in Adelaide, South Australia, Australia. The round consists of one 100km race, and two 250km races and is the final round of the 2026 Supercars Championship.

== Background ==
The event will be held on the weekend of 26–29 November 2026. It will be the 37th time Supercars will race at the Adelaide Street Circuit, including as a support category to the Formula One Australian Grand Prix as a non-championship event from 1985 to 1995. It will be the 27th Supercars championship race to be held on the circuit and the 2nd running using the Finals Series format and will consist of one 100km race followed by two 250km races in the Finals Series format.

This will be the final year that Supercars will use the layout that has been used since the inaugural Adelaide 500 in 1999, before it will be redeveloped and redesigned in time for MotoGP's first visit to Adelaide, as part of the Australian Motorcycle Grand Prix.

=== Entry List ===
Twenty-four cars are expected enter the event — eight Chevrolet Camaros, eleven Ford Mustangs, and five Toyota GR Supras. No wildcard are expected to enter the event.

=== Support Series ===
- Super2 Series (2 races)
- GT World Challenge Australia (2 races)
- Porsche Carrera Cup Australia (3 races)
- V8 SuperUtes (4 races)
- Australian Rally Championship (event on site)
- NAPA Speedway in The City (event on site)

== Results ==
=== Qualifying 1 ===
| Pos. | No. | Driver | Team | Car | Time | Gap | Grid |
|---|---|---|---|---|---|---|---|
| 1 | | | | | | | 1 |
| 2 | | | | | | | 2 |
| 3 | | | | | | | 3 |
| 4 | | | | | | | 4 |
| 5 | | | | | | | 5 |
| 6 | | | | | | | 6 |
| 7 | | | | | | | 7 |
| 8 | | | | | | | 8 |
| 9 | | | | | | | 9 |
| 10 | | | | | | | 10 |
| 11 | | | | | | | 11 |
| 12 | | | | | | | 12 |
| 13 | | | | | | | 13 |
| 14 | | | | | | | 14 |
| 15 | | | | | | | 15 |
| 16 | | | | | | | 16 |
| 17 | | | | | | | 17 |
| 18 | | | | | | | 18 |
| 19 | | | | | | | 19 |
| 20 | | | | | | | 20 |
| 21 | | | | | | | 21 |
| 22 | | | | | | | 22 |
| 23 | | | | | | | 23 |
| 24 | | | | | | | 24 |

=== Race 1 ===
| Pos. | No. | Driver | Team | Car | Laps | Time/Retired | Grid | Pts |
|---|---|---|---|---|---|---|---|---|
| 1 | | | | | | | | |
| 2 | | | | | | | | |
| 3 | | | | | | | | |
| 4 | | | | | | | | |
| 5 | | | | | | | | |
| 6 | | | | | | | | |
| 7 | | | | | | | | |
| 8 | | | | | | | | |
| 9 | | | | | | | | |
| 10 | | | | | | | | |
| 11 | | | | | | | | |
| 12 | | | | | | | | |
| 13 | | | | | | | | |
| 14 | | | | | | | | |
| 15 | | | | | | | | |
| 16 | | | | | | | | |
| 17 | | | | | | | | |
| 18 | | | | | | | | |
| 19 | | | | | | | | |
| 20 | | | | | | | | |
| 21 | | | | | | | | |
| 22 | | | | | | | | |
| 23 | | | | | | | | |
| 24 | | | | | | | | |

=== Qualifying 2 ===
| Pos. | No. | Driver | Team | Car | Time | Gap | Grid |
|---|---|---|---|---|---|---|---|
| 1 | | | | | | | 1 |
| 2 | | | | | | | 2 |
| 3 | | | | | | | 3 |
| 4 | | | | | | | 4 |
| 5 | | | | | | | 5 |
| 6 | | | | | | | 6 |
| 7 | | | | | | | 7 |
| 8 | | | | | | | 8 |
| 9 | | | | | | | 9 |
| 10 | | | | | | | 10 |
| 11 | | | | | | | 11 |
| 12 | | | | | | | 12 |
| 13 | | | | | | | 13 |
| 14 | | | | | | | 14 |
| 15 | | | | | | | 15 |
| 16 | | | | | | | 16 |
| 17 | | | | | | | 17 |
| 18 | | | | | | | 18 |
| 19 | | | | | | | 19 |
| 20 | | | | | | | 20 |
| 21 | | | | | | | 21 |
| 22 | | | | | | | 22 |
| 23 | | | | | | | 23 |
| 24 | | | | | | | 24 |

=== Race 2 ===
| Pos. | No. | Driver | Team | Car | Laps | Time/Retired | Grid | Pts |
|---|---|---|---|---|---|---|---|---|
| 1 | | | | | | | | |
| 2 | | | | | | | | |
| 3 | | | | | | | | |
| 4 | | | | | | | | |
| 5 | | | | | | | | |
| 6 | | | | | | | | |
| 7 | | | | | | | | |
| 8 | | | | | | | | |
| 9 | | | | | | | | |
| 10 | | | | | | | | |
| 11 | | | | | | | | |
| 12 | | | | | | | | |
| 13 | | | | | | | | |
| 14 | | | | | | | | |
| 15 | | | | | | | | |
| 16 | | | | | | | | |
| 17 | | | | | | | | |
| 18 | | | | | | | | |
| 19 | | | | | | | | |
| 20 | | | | | | | | |
| 21 | | | | | | | | |
| 22 | | | | | | | | |
| 23 | | | | | | | | |
| 24 | | | | | | | | |

=== Qualifying 3 ===
==== Provisional ====
| Pos. | No. | Driver | Team | Car | Time | Gap | Grid |
|---|---|---|---|---|---|---|---|
| 1 | | | | | | | Top 10 |
| 2 | | | | | | | Top 10 |
| 3 | | | | | | | Top 10 |
| 4 | | | | | | | Top 10 |
| 5 | | | | | | | Top 10 |
| 6 | | | | | | | Top 10 |
| 7 | | | | | | | Top 10 |
| 8 | | | | | | | Top 10 |
| 9 | | | | | | | Top 10 |
| 10 | | | | | | | Top 10 |
| 11 | | | | | | | 11 |
| 12 | | | | | | | 12 |
| 13 | | | | | | | 13 |
| 14 | | | | | | | 14 |
| 15 | | | | | | | 15 |
| 16 | | | | | | | 16 |
| 17 | | | | | | | 17 |
| 18 | | | | | | | 18 |
| 19 | | | | | | | 19 |
| 20 | | | | | | | 20 |
| 21 | | | | | | | 21 |
| 22 | | | | | | | 22 |
| 23 | | | | | | | 23 |
| 24 | | | | | | | 24 |

==== Top-Ten Shootout ====
| Pos. | No. | Driver | Team | Car | Time | Gap | Grid |
|---|---|---|---|---|---|---|---|
| 1 | | | | | | | 1 |
| 2 | | | | | | | 2 |
| 3 | | | | | | | 3 |
| 4 | | | | | | | 4 |
| 5 | | | | | | | 5 |
| 6 | | | | | | | 6 |
| 7 | | | | | | | 7 |
| 8 | | | | | | | 8 |
| 9 | | | | | | | 9 |
| 10 | | | | | | | 10 |

=== Race 3 ===
| Pos. | No. | Driver | Team | Car | Laps | Time/Retired | Grid | Pts |
|---|---|---|---|---|---|---|---|---|
| 1 | | | | | | | | |
| 2 | | | | | | | | |
| 3 | | | | | | | | |
| 4 | | | | | | | | |
| 5 | | | | | | | | |
| 6 | | | | | | | | |
| 7 | | | | | | | | |
| 8 | | | | | | | | |
| 9 | | | | | | | | |
| 10 | | | | | | | | |
| 11 | | | | | | | | |
| 12 | | | | | | | | |
| 13 | | | | | | | | |
| 14 | | | | | | | | |
| 15 | | | | | | | | |
| 16 | | | | | | | | |
| 17 | | | | | | | | |
| 18 | | | | | | | | |
| 19 | | | | | | | | |
| 20 | | | | | | | | |
| 21 | | | | | | | | |
| 22 | | | | | | | | |
| 23 | | | | | | | | |
| 24 | | | | | | | | |
