= Zach Bates =

Australian racing driver

- Nationality: Australian
- Born: Zachary Richard Bates; 8 April 2004 (age 22) Canberra, Australian Capital Territory
- Relatives: Rick Bates (father); Neal Bates (uncle); Harry Bates (cousin)

Supercars Championship career
- Debut season: 2025 Supercars Championship
- Current team: Matt Stone Racing
- Car number: 10
- Former teams: Triple Eight Race Engineering
- Starts: 39
- Wins: 0
- Podiums: 1
- Poles: 1
- Best finish: 33rd in 2025

Previous series
- 2023–25 2019, 21 2019 2021–22 2022, 24: Dunlop Super2 Series; Australian Formula Ford Championship; NSW Formula Ford Championship; Toyota Gazoo Racing Australia 86 Series; Australian National Trans-Am Series

Championship titles
- 2024: Super2 Series

Zachary Richard Bates (born 8 April 2004) is an Australian racing driver who competes in the Supercars Championship for Matt Stone Racing. He is the son of former rally driver and V8 Supercars regular Rick, Bates was runner-up in the 2022 Toyota Gazoo Racing Australia 86 Series and the 2024 Super2 Series champion. Zach is the nephew of four-time Australian Rally Champion Neal Bates. He is also the cousin of three-time Australian Rally Champion Harry Bates, and cousin of Lewis Bates, also an Australian Rally Champion.

Bates made his debut in the 2025 Supercars Championship in wildcard entries for Triple Eight Race Engineering. He raced the full 2026 Supercars Championship season for Matt Stone Racing. He qualified in pole position for the 2026 Bathurst 1000 and finished third with codriver Aaron Seton.

== Career results ==
=== Summary ===
| Season | Series | Position | Car | Team |
|---|---|---|---|---|
| 2019 | Australian Formula Ford Series | N/A | Mygale–Ford SJ10A | Bates Advanced Driving |
| 2019 | New South Wales Formula Ford Championship | 2nd | Mygale–Ford SJ10A | Bates Advanced Driving |
| 2021 | Australian Formula Ford Championship | N/A | Mygale–Ford SJ10A | BF Racing |
| 2021 | Toyota Gazoo Racing Australia 86 Series | – (Note: Not enough rounds were held to declare championship results.) | Toyota 86 | N/A |
| 2022 | Toyota Gazoo Racing Australia 86 Series | 2nd | Toyota 86 | Bates Advanced Driving |
| 2022 | Australian National Trans-Am Series | 31st | Ford Mustang | MBSFM |
| 2023 | Super2 Series | 5th | Holden Commodore ZB | Walkinshaw Andretti United |
| 2024 | Super2 Series | 1st | Holden Commodore ZB | Walkinshaw Andretti United |
| 2025 | Super2 Series | 11th | Holden Commodore ZB | Eggleston Motorsport |
| 2025 | Supercars Championship | 26th | Chevrolet Camaro ZL1 | Triple Eight Race Engineering |

=== Super2 Series results ===
(key) (Race results only)

Super2 Series results
| Year | Team | No. | Car | 1 | 2 | 3 | 4 | 5 | 6 | 7 | 8 | 9 | 10 | 11 | 12 | Position | Points |
|---|---|---|---|---|---|---|---|---|---|---|---|---|---|---|---|---|---|
| 2023 | Walkinshaw Andretti United | 25 | Holden Commodore ZB | NEW; R1; 11 | NEW; R2; 13 | BAR; R3; 10 | BAR; R4; 18 | TOW; R5; 10 | TOW; R6; 7 | SAN; R7; 3 | SAN; R8; 5 | BAT; R9; 4 | BAT; R10; 3 | ADE; R11; 10 | ADE; R12; 3 | 5th | 1143 |
| 2024 | Walkinshaw Andretti United | 25 | Holden Commodore ZB | BAT1; R1; 3 | BAT1; R2; 19 | BAR; R3; 3 | BAR; R4; 1 | TOW; R5; 17 | TOW; R6; 2 | SAN; R7; 3 | SAN; R8; 3 | BAT2; R9; 5 | BAT2; R10; 4 | ADE; R11; 2 | ADE; R12; 1 | 1st | 1425 |
| 2025 | Eggleston Motorsport | 1 | Holden Commodore ZB | SMP; R1; 9 | SMP; R2; 5 | SYM; R3; 14 | SYM; R4; 2 | TOW; R5; 13 | TOW; R6; 10 | QLD; R7; 8 | QLD; R8; Ret | BAT; R9; 14 | BAT; R10; 8 | ADE; R11; 2 | ADE; R12; Ret | 11th | 921 |

=== Supercars Championship results ===
Supercars results
| Year | Team | Car | 1 | 2 | 3 | 4 | 5 | 6 | 7 | 8 | 9 | 10 | 11 | 12 | 13 | 14 | 15 | 16 | 17 | 18 | 19 | 20 | 21 | 22 | 23 | 24 | 25 | 26 | 27 | 28 | 29 | 30 | 31 | 32 | 33 | 34 | 35 | 36 | 37 | Position | Points |
|---|---|---|---|---|---|---|---|---|---|---|---|---|---|---|---|---|---|---|---|---|---|---|---|---|---|---|---|---|---|---|---|---|---|---|---|---|---|---|---|---|---|
| 2025 | Triple Eight Race Engineering | Chevrolet Camaro ZL1 | SYD; R1 | SYD; R2 | SYD; R3 | MEL; R4 | MEL; R5 | MEL; R6 | MEL; R7 | TAU; R8 | TAU; R9 | TAU; R10 | SYM; R11 | SYM; R12 | SYM; R13 | BAR; R14 | BAR; R15 | BAR; R16 | HID; R17 | HID; R18 | HID; R19 | TOW; R20 | TOW; R21 | TOW; R22 | QLD; R23; 16 | QLD; R24; 17 | QLD; R25; 20 | BEN; R26; 16 | BAT; R27; 10 | SUR; R28 | SUR; R29 | SAN; R30 | SAN; R31 | ADE; R32 | ADE; R33 | ADE; R34 | | | | 33rd | 301 |
| 2026 | Matt Stone Racing | Chevrolet Camaro ZL1 | SMP; R1; 14 | SMP; R2; 17 | SMP; R3; 13 | MEL; R4; 19 | MEL; R5; 17 | MEL; R6; 14 | MEL; R7; Ret | TAU; R8; 17 | TAU; R9; 17 | CHR; R10; 9 | CHR; R11; 10 | CHR; R12; 14 | CHR; R13; 15 | SYM; R14; 11 | SYM; R15; 13 | SYM; R16; 20 | HID; R20; 16 | HID; R21; 22 | HID; R22; 21 | TOW; R23; 23 | TOW; R24; 14 | TOW; R25; 14 | BAR; R17; 22 | BAR; R18; 22 | BAR; R19; 22 | QLD; R26; 19 | QLD; R27; 23 | QLD; R28; 16 | BEN; R28; 12 | BAT; R30; 3 | SUR; R31; 12 | SUR; R32; 18 | SAN; R33; 10 | SAN; R34; 12 | ADE; R35 | ADE; R36 | ADE; R37 | 16th* | 1296* |

=== Bathurst 1000 results ===
| Year | Team | Car | Co-drivers | Pos | Laps |
|---|---|---|---|---|---|
| 2025 | Triple Eight Race Engineering | Chevrolet Camaro Mk.6 | (Australia) Craig Lowndes | 10th | 161 |
| 2026 | Matt Stone Racing | Chevrolet Camaro ZL1 | (Australia) Aaron Seton | 3rd | 161 |

=== Complete Bathurst 6 Hour results ===
| Year | Team | Co-drivers | Car | Class | Laps | Pos. | Class pos. |
|---|---|---|---|---|---|---|---|
| 2024 | (Australia) Osborne Motorsport | (Australia) Colin Osborne (Australia) Rick Bates | Renault Mégane RS265 | C | 0 | DNS | DNS |
| 2026 | (Australia) Cachet Homes | (Australia) Josh Muggleton (Australia) Chris Lillis | Chevrolet Camaro 2SS | A2 | 114 | 3rd | 2nd |
