= 2026 Supercars Championship =

Motor racing competition

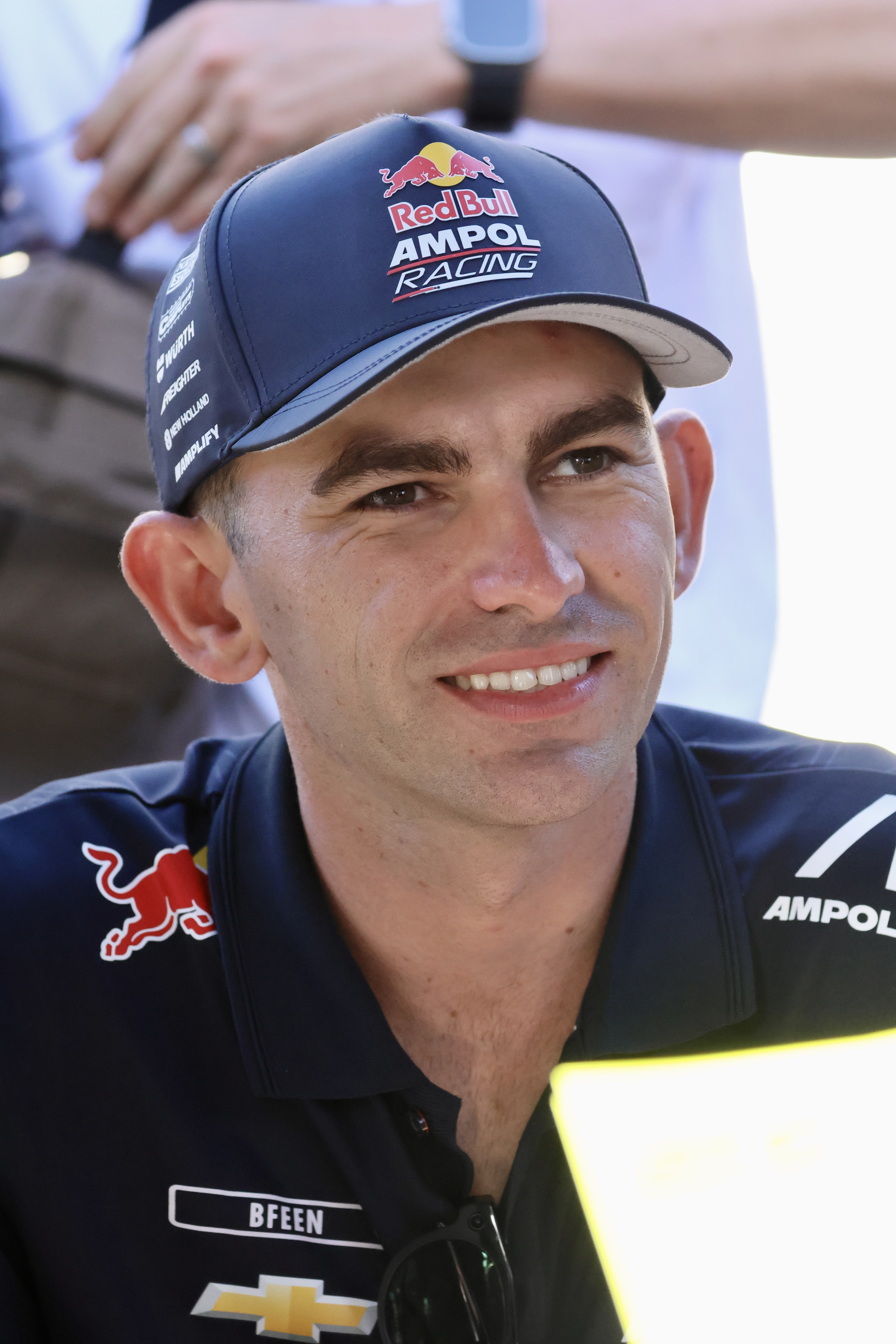
Broc Feeney successfully defended the Sprint Cup title

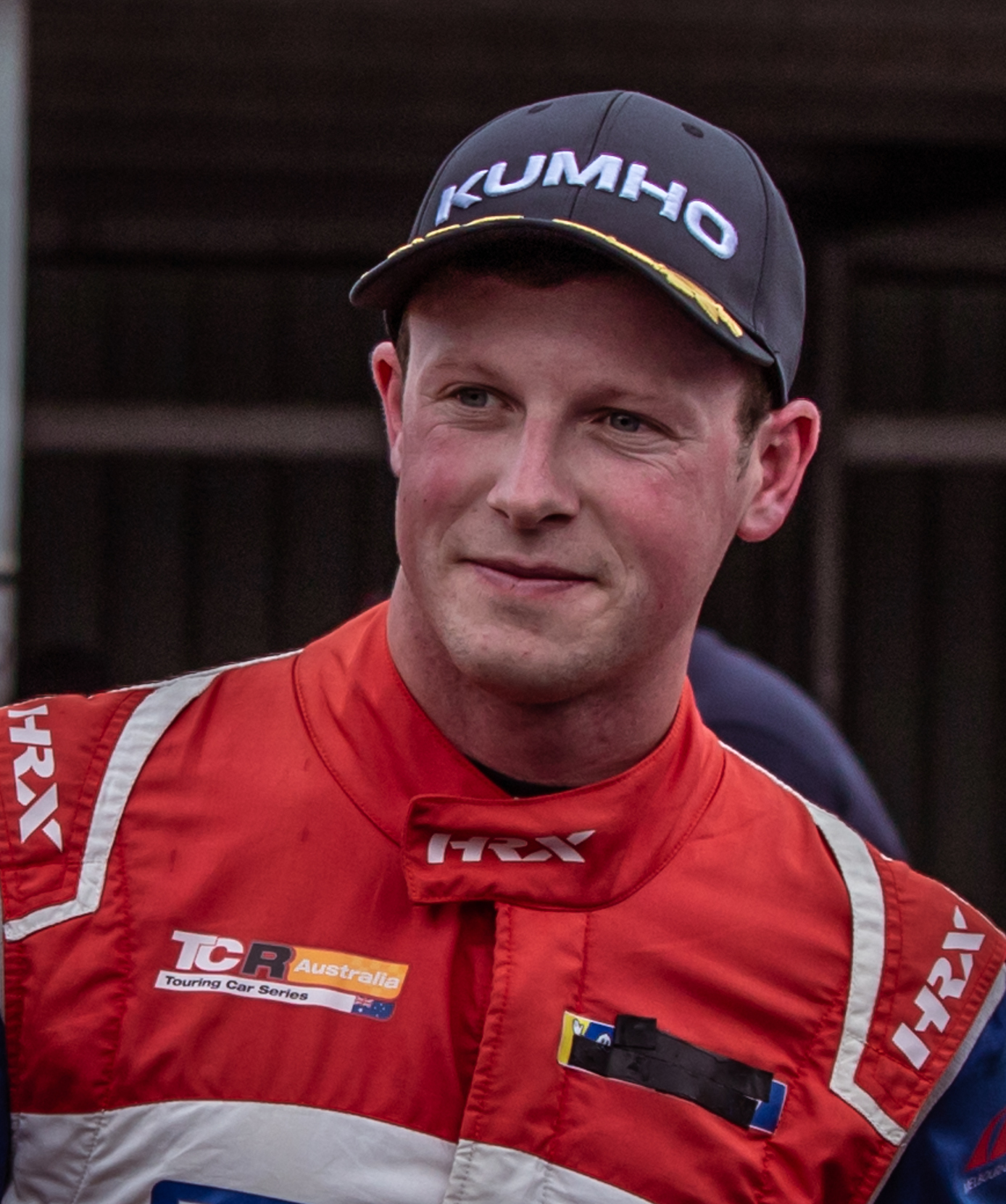
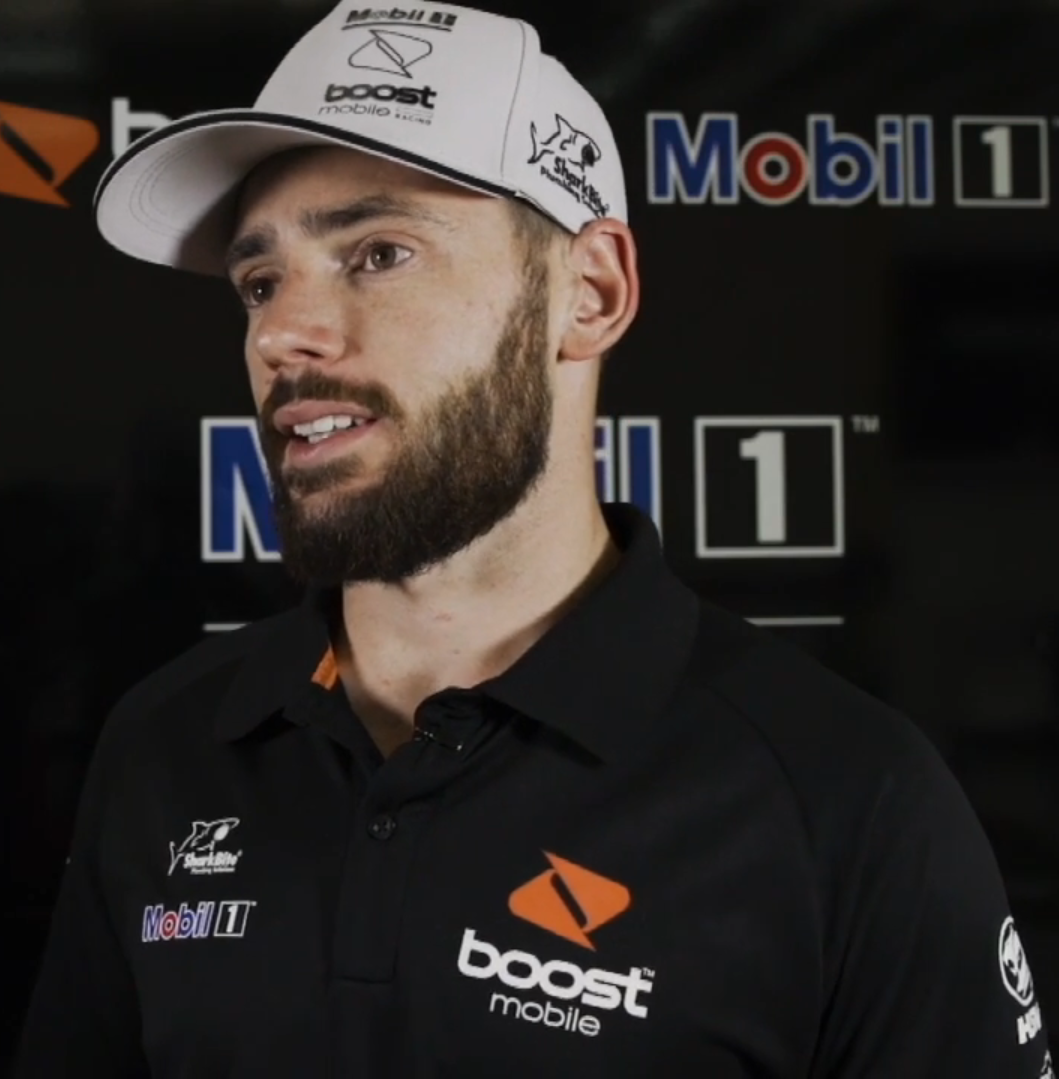
Will Brown and Scott Pye won the Enduro Cup.

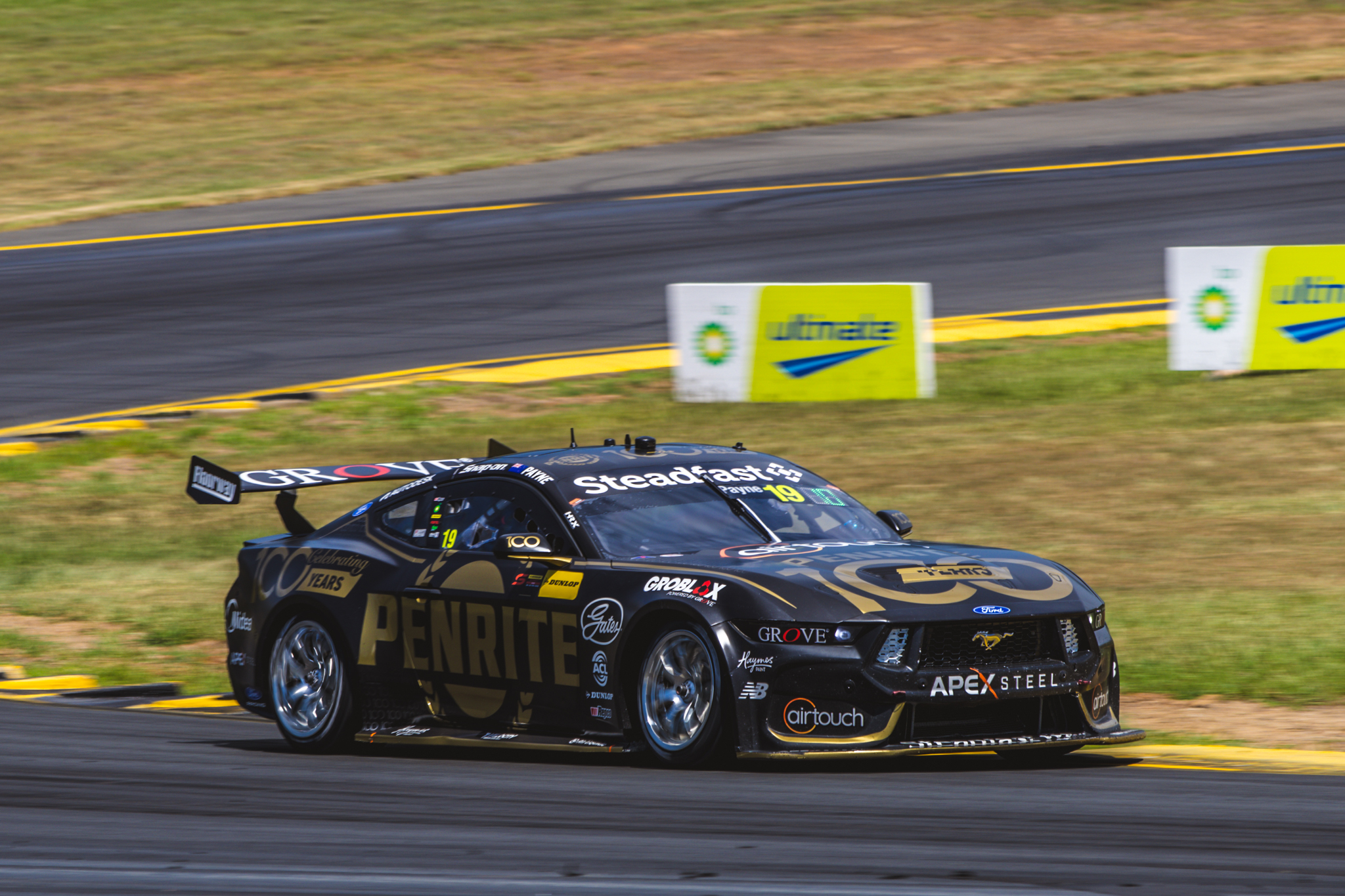
Grove Racing are the current Teams' Championship leader.

The 2026 Supercars Championship (known for commercial reasons as the 2026 Repco Supercars Championship) is a motor racing series for Supercars. It is the twenty-eighth running of the Supercars Championship and the thirtieth series in which Supercars have contested the Australian Touring Car Championship, the premier title in Australian motorsport. It is the sixty-seventh season of touring car racing in Australia.

Chaz Mostert entered the championship as the defending Drivers' Champion, whilst Broc Feeney and Triple Eight Race Engineering entered the championship as the defending Sprint Cup Champion and reigning Team's Champions, respectively.

2026 marked the year that Toyota entered the championship, with two teams fielding the GR Supra.

== Teams and drivers ==
The following teams and drivers compete in the 2026 championship.

Championship entries						Endurance entries	
Manufacturer	Model	Team	No.	Driver name	Rounds	Co-driver name	Rounds
Chevrolet	Camaro ZL1	Matt Stone Racing	4	(Australia) Jack Le Brocq	All	(Australia) Harri Jones	10–11
Chevrolet	Camaro ZL1	Matt Stone Racing	10	(Australia) Zach Bates	All	(Australia) Aaron Seton	10–11
Chevrolet	Camaro ZL1	Erebus Motorsport	9	(Australia) Jobe Stewart	All	(Australia) Jarrod Hughes	10–11
Chevrolet	Camaro ZL1	Erebus Motorsport	99	(Australia) Cooper Murray	1–11	(Australia) Lochie Dalton	10–11
Chevrolet	Camaro ZL1	Erebus Motorsport	99	(Australia) Jarrod Hughes	12–14		
Chevrolet	Camaro ZL1	Team 18	18	(Australia) Anton De Pasquale	All	(Australia) Lee Holdsworth	10–11
Chevrolet	Camaro ZL1	Team 18	20	(Australia) David Reynolds	All	(Australia) James Courtney	10–11
Chevrolet	Camaro ZL1	PremiAir Racing	31	(Australia) Jayden Ojeda	All	(Australia) David Russell	10–11
Chevrolet	Camaro ZL1	PremiAir Racing	36	(Australia) Cooper Murray	12–14		
Chevrolet	Camaro ZL1	PremiAir Racing	777	(Australia) Declan Fraser	1–11	(Australia) Nash Morris	10–11
Ford	Mustang S650	Blanchard Racing Team	3	(Australia) Aaron Cameron	All	(Australia) Zak Best	10–11
Ford	Mustang S650	Blanchard Racing Team	7	(Australia) James Golding	All	(New Zealand) Richie Stanaway	10–11
Ford	Mustang S650	Tickford Racing	6	(Australia) Cam Waters	All	(Australia) Mark Winterbottom	10–11
Ford	Mustang S650	Tickford Racing	55	(Australia) Thomas Randle	All	(Australia) Reuben Goodall	10–11
Ford	Mustang S650	Tickford Racing	55	(Australia) Mark Winterbottom	6		
Ford	Mustang S650	Triple Eight Race Engineering	11	(Australia) Jackson Walls	All	(Australia) Jack Perkins	10–11
Ford	Mustang S650	Triple Eight Race Engineering	88	(Australia) Broc Feeney	All	(Australia) Nick Percat	10–11
Ford	Mustang S650	Triple Eight Race Engineering	888	(Australia) Will Brown	All	(Australia) Scott Pye	10–11
Ford	Mustang S650	Dick Johnson Racing	17	(Australia) Brodie Kostecki	All	(Australia) Todd Hazelwood	10–11
Ford	Mustang S650	Dick Johnson Racing	17	(Australia) Todd Hazelwood	6		
Ford	Mustang S650	Dick Johnson Racing	38	(Australia) Rylan Gray	All	(Australia) Tony D'Alberto	10–11
Ford	Mustang S650	Grove Racing	19	(New Zealand) Matt Payne	All	(Australia) Will Davison	10–11
Ford	Mustang S650	Grove Racing	26	(Australia) Kai Allen	All	(Australia) Tim Slade	10–11
Toyota	GR Supra	Walkinshaw TWG Racing	1	(Australia) Chaz Mostert	All	(New Zealand) Fabian Coulthard	10–11
Toyota	GR Supra	Walkinshaw TWG Racing	2	(New Zealand) Ryan Wood	All	(New Zealand) Jaxon Evans	10–11
Toyota	GR Supra	Brad Jones Racing	8	(New Zealand) Andre Heimgartner	All	(Australia) Bryce Fullwood	10–11
Toyota	GR Supra	Brad Jones Racing	14	(Australia) Cameron Hill	All	(Australia) Brad Vaughan	10–11
Toyota	GR Supra	Brad Jones Racing	96	(Australia) Macauley Jones	All	(Australia) Jordan Boys	10–11
Wildcard Entries
Chevrolet	Camaro ZL1	Team 18	15	(Australia) Bayley Hall	9–11	(Australia) Craig Lowndes	10–11
Chevrolet	Camaro ZL1	Matt Stone Racing	30	(Australia) Aaron Seton	7, 9		
Chevrolet	Camaro ZL1	Garry Rogers Motorsport	34			(Australia) James Moffat (Australia) Nathan Herne	11
Ford	Mustang S650	Tickford Racing	5	(Australia) Reuben Goodall	7		
Ford	Mustang S650	Tickford Racing	5	(Australia) Ben Gomersall	9–10	(Australia) Campbell Logan	10

=== Manufacturer changes ===
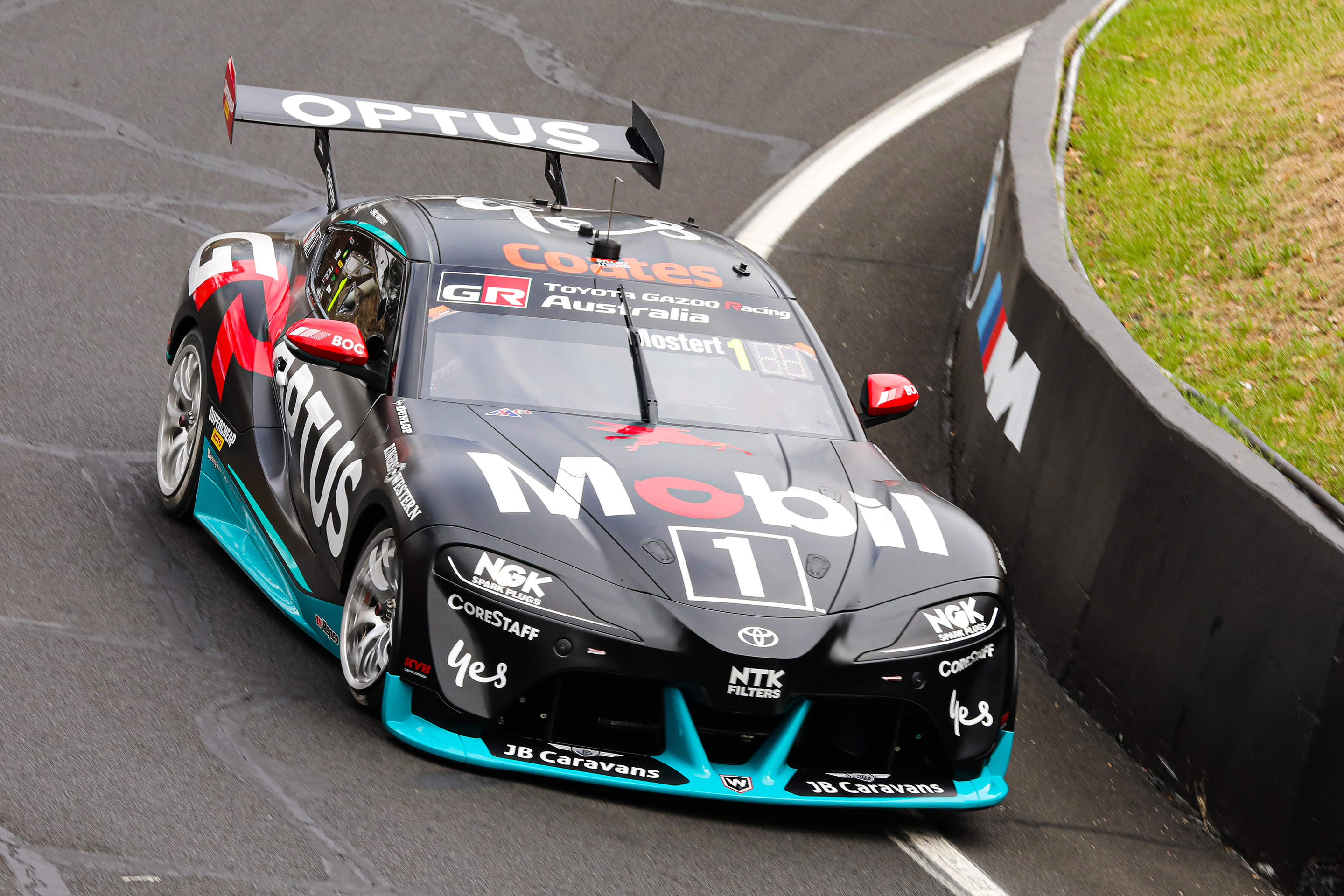
Toyota entered the series, with Walkinshaw TWG Racing (pictured) and Brad Jones Racing running the GR Supra.

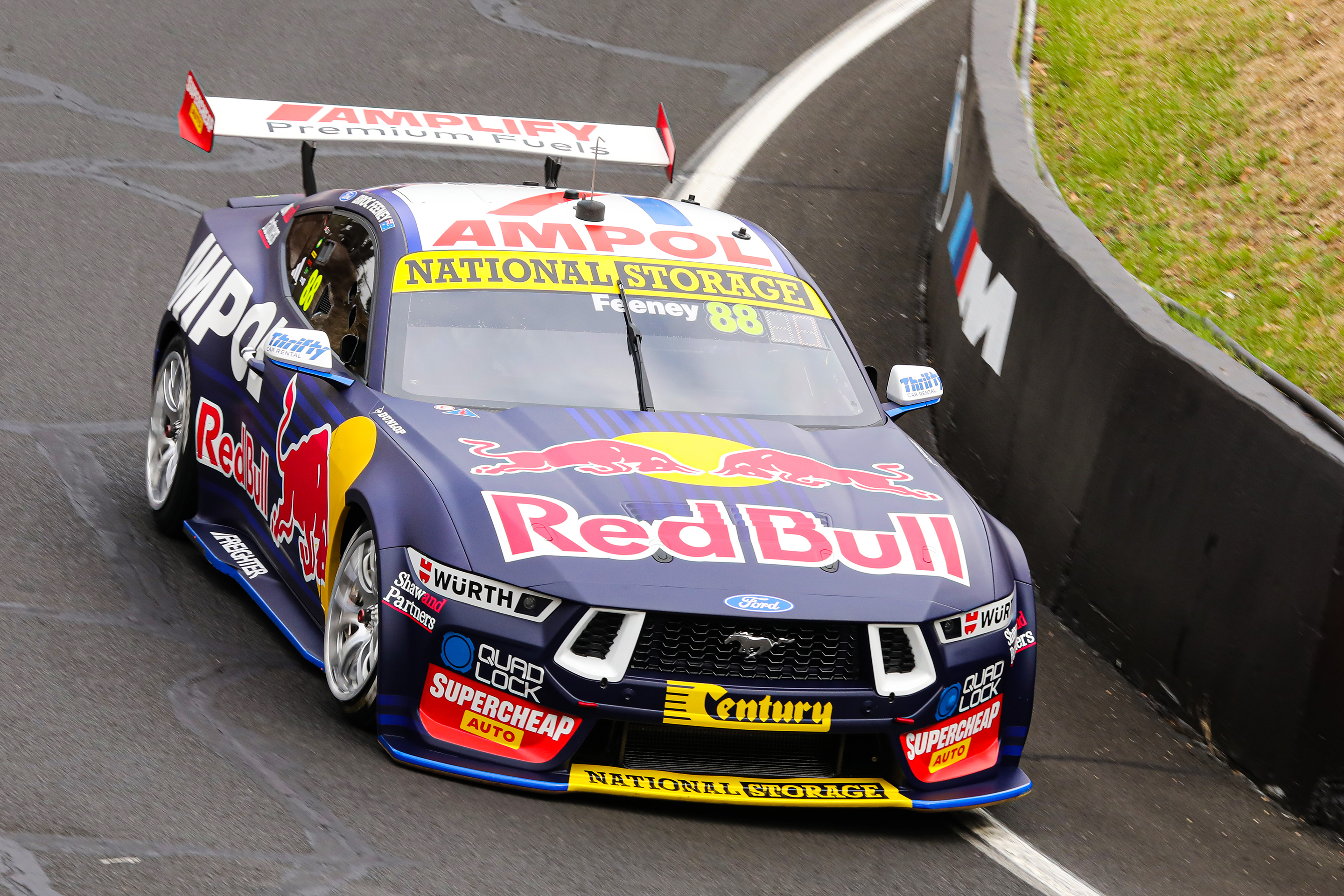
Triple Eight Race Engineering switched from running Chevrolet Camaro ZL1s to Ford Mustang GTs.

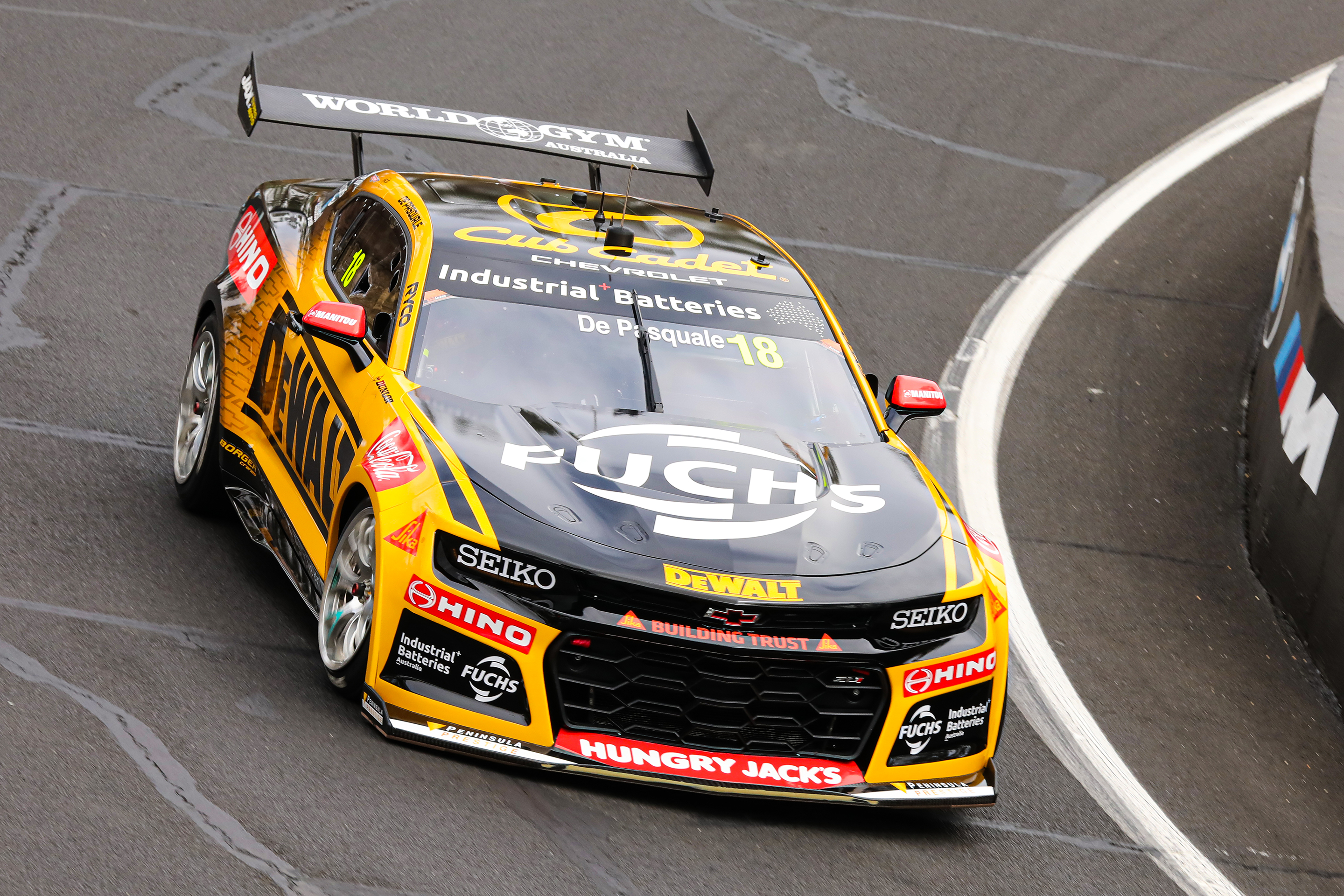
Team 18 replaced Triple Eight Race Engineering as the homologation team for Chevrolet.

Toyota entered the series, marking the first time that three manufacturers are represented since 2019, when Nissan left the series.

=== Team changes ===
Walkinshaw TWG Racing (formerly Walkinshaw Andretti United) switched from running Ford Mustangs to Toyota GR Supras in a collaboration with Toyota Gazoo Racing, to become the Japanese manufacturer's factory racing team. The team also underwent a name change as United Autosports sold their stake in the team and Andretti Global had been taken over by TWG Motorsports in 2023.

Brad Jones Racing joined Walkinshaw TWG Racing in switching to Toyota GR Supras, from running Chevrolet Camaros making it five Toyotas for 2026.

Triple Eight Race Engineering returned to Ford and running Mustangs, after having entered General Motors-backed Holdens and Chevrolets since 2010. Triple Eight Race Engineering also became the homologation team for all Ford teams. They also expanded to a three car team, for the first time since 2018, utilising a Teams Racing Charter (TRC) from SCT Motorsport, who parted ways with Brad Jones Racing.

Team 18 became the homologation team for Chevrolet following Triple Eight Race Engineering's departure from the brand. They are the third General Motors homologation team in the V8 Supercars era, after Walkinshaw Racing (1993–2016) and Triple Eight Race Engineering (2017–2025).

=== Driver changes ===
Nick Percat announced his retirement from full-time competition at the end of 2025, and joined Triple Eight Race Engineering as a co-driver. His seat at Matt Stone Racing was taken by 2024 Super2 Champion Zach Bates.

James Courtney also retired from full-time competition and will join Team 18 as a co-driver.

James Golding replaced Courtney at the Blanchard Racing Team. Golding left PremiAir Racing, who fields a new lineup following the departure of Richie Stanaway after the 2025 Gold Coast 500. The pair was replaced by Declan Fraser, who made his first full-time return to the category since 2023, and Jayden Ojeda, who made his full-time debut in the category after participating in various races as a wildcard and co-driver since 2020, including replacing Stanaway for the final two rounds of the previous season. Stanaway joined the Blanchard Racing Team as a co-driver, partnering Golding.

Will Davison stepped back from full-time competition and departed Dick Johnson Racing, where he was replaced by 2025 Super2 Series champion Rylan Gray. Davison joined Grove Racing as a co-driver for the Enduro Cup races.

Cameron Hill departed from Matt Stone Racing to join Brad Jones Racing, replacing Bryce Fullwood. He was replaced by Jack Le Brocq, who departed Erebus Motorsport to return to the team for the first time since 2023. The Erebus seat was filled by Jobe Stewart, who graduated from the Super2 Series.

Jaxon Evans lost his seat at Brad Jones Racing as SCT Motorsport moved their Teams Racing Charter to Triple Eight Race Engineering. Jackson Walls was named as SCT's driver, graduating from the Super2 Series. Evans will join Walkinshaw Andretti United as a co-driver.

=== Mid season changes ===
Brodie Kostecki was ruled out of the final race of the Darwin Triple Crown, due to heat related illness. He was replaced by his enduro co-driver Todd Hazelwood.

Thomas Randle was also ruled out of the final race of the Darwin Triple Crown, due to heat related illness. He was also replaced by Endurance Cup co-driver Mark Winterbottom.

Declan Fraser was replaced by Cooper Murray at PremiAir Racing for the final three rounds of the season, with Cooper's seat replaced by Jarrod Hughes.

=== Wildcard entries ===
With Triple Eight Race Engineering switching brands from Chevrolet to Ford, their wildcard program concluded. As a result, Craig Lowndes left after 20 years with the team and moved to Team 18, who started a wildcard entry as they became the homologation team for Chevrolet. Lowndes will be joined by Porsche Carrera Cup race winner Bayley Hall for the enduros, while Hall will get a solo round in Ipswich.

Matt Stone Racing will run a wildcard entry for Aaron Seton in Townsville and Ipswich. Initially, the Townsville entry was intended for Cameron Crick, however health issues prevented Crick from following through with these plans, and the drive subsequently went to Seton.

Tickford Racing will run a wildcard entry for Reuben Goodall in Townsville, and for Ben Gomersall in Ipswich and Tailem Bend. Joining Gomersall for the enduro at The Bend will be Campbell Logan.

Garry Rogers Motorsport entered an ex-Triple Eight Camaro for James Moffat and two-time Australian National Trans-Am Series champion Nathan Herne for the Bathurst 1000, the first time the team competed in the series since the same race in 2020. The entry will be Herne's debut in the championship; he attempted to compete as part of the 2020 effort, but was denied the required licence.

== Calendar ==
The following circuits are due to host a round of the 2026 championship.

Round	Race	Event	Circuit	Location	Dates	Maps
Sprint Cup						Maps
1	1	Sydney 500	(New South Wales) Sydney Motorsport Park	Eastern Creek, New South Wales	20–22 February	2026 Supercars Championship is located in Australia
1	2	Sydney 500	(New South Wales) Sydney Motorsport Park	Eastern Creek, New South Wales	20–22 February	2026 Supercars Championship is located in Australia
1	3	Sydney 500	(New South Wales) Sydney Motorsport Park	Eastern Creek, New South Wales	20–22 February	2026 Supercars Championship is located in Australia
2	4	Melbourne SuperSprint	(Victoria (state)) Albert Park Circuit	Albert Park, Victoria	5–8 March	2026 Supercars Championship is located in Australia
2	5	Melbourne SuperSprint	(Victoria (state)) Albert Park Circuit	Albert Park, Victoria	5–8 March	2026 Supercars Championship is located in Australia
2	6	Melbourne SuperSprint	(Victoria (state)) Albert Park Circuit	Albert Park, Victoria	5–8 March	2026 Supercars Championship is located in Australia
2	7	Melbourne SuperSprint	(Victoria (state)) Albert Park Circuit	Albert Park, Victoria	5–8 March	2026 Supercars Championship is located in Australia
3	8	Taupō Super 440	(New Zealand) Taupō International Motorsport Park	Taupō, Waikato Region	10–11 April	2026 Supercars Championship is located in Australia
3	9	Taupō Super 440	(New Zealand) Taupō International Motorsport Park	Taupō, Waikato Region	10–11 April	2026 Supercars Championship is located in Australia
4	10 (Note: Race 10 was postponed due to Cyclone Vaianu.)	Christchurch Super 440	(New Zealand) Euromarque Motorsport Park	Christchurch, Canterbury Region	17–19 April	2026 Supercars Championship is located in Australia
4	11	Christchurch Super 440	(New Zealand) Euromarque Motorsport Park	Christchurch, Canterbury Region	17–19 April	2026 Supercars Championship is located in Australia
4	12	Christchurch Super 440	(New Zealand) Euromarque Motorsport Park	Christchurch, Canterbury Region	17–19 April	2026 Supercars Championship is located in Australia
4	13	Christchurch Super 440	(New Zealand) Euromarque Motorsport Park	Christchurch, Canterbury Region	17–19 April	2026 Supercars Championship is located in Australia
5	14	Tasmania Super 440	(Tasmania) Symmons Plains Raceway	Launceston, Tasmania	22–24 May	2026 Supercars Championship is located in Australia
5	15	Tasmania Super 440	(Tasmania) Symmons Plains Raceway	Launceston, Tasmania	22–24 May	2026 Supercars Championship is located in Australia
5	16	Tasmania Super 440	(Tasmania) Symmons Plains Raceway	Launceston, Tasmania	22–24 May	2026 Supercars Championship is located in Australia
6	17	Darwin Triple Crown	(Northern Territory) Hidden Valley Raceway	Darwin, Northern Territory	19–21 June	2026 Supercars Championship is located in Australia
6	18	Darwin Triple Crown	(Northern Territory) Hidden Valley Raceway	Darwin, Northern Territory	19–21 June	2026 Supercars Championship is located in Australia
6	19	Darwin Triple Crown	(Northern Territory) Hidden Valley Raceway	Darwin, Northern Territory	19–21 June	2026 Supercars Championship is located in Australia
7	20	Townsville 500	(Queensland) Reid Park Street Circuit	Townsville, Queensland	10–12 July	2026 Supercars Championship is located in Australia
7	21	Townsville 500	(Queensland) Reid Park Street Circuit	Townsville, Queensland	10–12 July	2026 Supercars Championship is located in Australia
7	22	Townsville 500	(Queensland) Reid Park Street Circuit	Townsville, Queensland	10–12 July	2026 Supercars Championship is located in New Zealand
8	23	Perth Super 440	(Western Australia) Wanneroo Raceway	Neerabup, Western Australia	31 July – 2 August	2026 Supercars Championship is located in New Zealand
8	24	Perth Super 440	(Western Australia) Wanneroo Raceway	Neerabup, Western Australia	31 July – 2 August	2026 Supercars Championship is located in New Zealand
8	25	Perth Super 440	(Western Australia) Wanneroo Raceway	Neerabup, Western Australia	31 July – 2 August	2026 Supercars Championship is located in New Zealand
9	26	Ipswich Super 440	Queensland Raceway	Ipswich, Queensland	21–23 August	2026 Supercars Championship is located in New Zealand
9	27	Ipswich Super 440	Queensland Raceway	Ipswich, Queensland	21–23 August	2026 Supercars Championship is located in New Zealand
9	28	Ipswich Super 440	Queensland Raceway	Ipswich, Queensland	21–23 August	2026 Supercars Championship is located in New Zealand
Enduro Cup						2026 Supercars Championship is located in New Zealand
10	29	The Bend 500	(South Australia) The Bend Motorsport Park	Tailem Bend, South Australia	11–13 September	2026 Supercars Championship is located in New Zealand
11	30	Bathurst 1000	(New South Wales) Mount Panorama Circuit	Bathurst, New South Wales	8–11 October	2026 Supercars Championship is located in New Zealand
Finals Series						2026 Supercars Championship is located in New Zealand
12	31	Gold Coast 500	(Queensland) Surfers Paradise Street Circuit	Surfers Paradise, Queensland	23–25 October	2026 Supercars Championship is located in New Zealand
12	32	Gold Coast 500	(Queensland) Surfers Paradise Street Circuit	Surfers Paradise, Queensland	23–25 October	2026 Supercars Championship is located in New Zealand
13	33	Sandown 500	(Victoria (state)) Sandown Raceway	Springvale, Victoria	6–8 November	2026 Supercars Championship is located in New Zealand
13	34	Sandown 500	(Victoria (state)) Sandown Raceway	Springvale, Victoria	6–8 November	2026 Supercars Championship is located in New Zealand
14	35	Adelaide Grand Final	(South Australia) Adelaide Street Circuit	Adelaide, South Australia	26–29 November	2026 Supercars Championship is located in New Zealand
14	36	Adelaide Grand Final	(South Australia) Adelaide Street Circuit	Adelaide, South Australia	26–29 November	2026 Supercars Championship is located in New Zealand
14	37	Adelaide Grand Final	(South Australia) Adelaide Street Circuit	Adelaide, South Australia	26–29 November	2026 Supercars Championship is located in New Zealand

=== Calendar changes ===
The Euromarque Motorsport Park will host a Supercars event—the Christchurch Super 440—for the first time. This will mark the first time in the category's history that two events will be held in New Zealand.

The Bend 500 will use the West layout for the first time since the second The Bend SuperSprint round in 2020, instead of the International layout, in order to increase overtaking possibilities, better viewing for spectators and offer more different strategies.

The third race of the Taupō Super 440 was cancelled in response to the incoming Cyclone Vaianu, with Race 10 occurring in Christchurch instead.

== Results and standings ==
=== Season summary ===
Round	Race	Event	Pole position	Fastest lap	Winning driver	Winning team	Report
1	1	Sydney 500	(Australia) James Golding	(Australia) Jayden Ojeda	(Australia) Broc Feeney	Triple Eight Race Engineering	Report
1	2	Sydney 500	(Australia) Anton de Pasquale	(Australia) James Golding	(Australia) Anton de Pasquale	Team 18	Report
1	3	Sydney 500	(Australia) Broc Feeney	(Australia) Cooper Murray	(Australia) Broc Feeney	Triple Eight Race Engineering	Report
2	4	Melbourne SuperSprint	(Australia) Brodie Kostecki	(Australia) Brodie Kostecki	(Australia) Brodie Kostecki	Dick Johnson Racing	Report
2	5	Melbourne SuperSprint	(New Zealand) Matt Payne	(Australia) Kai Allen	(Australia) Brodie Kostecki	Dick Johnson Racing	Report
2	6	Melbourne SuperSprint	(Australia) Broc Feeney	(Australia) Kai Allen	(Australia) Broc Feeney	Triple Eight Race Engineering	Report
2	7	Melbourne SuperSprint	(Australia) Will Brown	(New Zealand) Matt Payne	(Australia) Brodie Kostecki	Dick Johnson Racing	Report
3	8	Taupō Super 440	(Australia) Brodie Kostecki	(New Zealand) Ryan Wood	(Australia) Brodie Kostecki	Dick Johnson Racing	Report
3	9	Taupō Super 440	(New Zealand) Ryan Wood	(Australia) Broc Feeney	(New Zealand) Ryan Wood	Walkinshaw TWG Racing	Report
4	10	Christchurch Super 440	(New Zealand) Matt Payne	(New Zealand) Ryan Wood	(Australia) Kai Allen	Grove Racing	Report
4	11	Christchurch Super 440	(Australia) Brodie Kostecki	(New Zealand) Matt Payne	(Australia) Brodie Kostecki	Dick Johnson Racing	Report
4	12	Christchurch Super 440	(New Zealand) Ryan Wood	(New Zealand) Matt Payne	(New Zealand) Matt Payne	Grove Racing	Report
4	13	Christchurch Super 440	(New Zealand) Matt Payne	(New Zealand) Matt Payne	(New Zealand) Matt Payne	Grove Racing	Report
5	14	Tasmania Super 440	(Australia) Chaz Mostert	(Australia) Broc Feeney	(Australia) Chaz Mostert	Walkinshaw TWG Racing	Report
5	15	Tasmania Super 440	(New Zealand) Andre Heimgartner	(Australia) Jayden Ojeda	(New Zealand) Andre Heimgartner	Brad Jones Racing	Report
5	16	Tasmania Super 440	(Australia) Broc Feeney	(Australia) Broc Feeney	(Australia) Broc Feeney	Triple Eight Race Engineering	Report
6	17	Darwin Triple Crown	(Australia) Brodie Kostecki	(Australia) James Golding	(Australia) Cameron Waters	Tickford Racing	Report
6	18	Darwin Triple Crown	(Australia) Cameron Waters	(Australia) Chaz Mostert	(Australia) Kai Allen	Grove Racing	Report
6	19	Darwin Triple Crown	(Australia) Cameron Waters	(Australia) Anton de Pasquale	(Australia) Anton de Pasquale	Team 18	Report
7	20	Townsville 500	(Australia) Brodie Kostecki	(Australia) Brodie Kostecki	(Australia) Cameron Waters	Tickford Racing	Report
7	21	Townsville 500	(Australia) Brodie Kostecki	(Australia) Jack Le Brocq	(New Zealand) Matt Payne	Grove Racing	Report
7	22	Townsville 500	(Australia) Cameron Waters	(Australia) Cooper Murray	(Australia) Brodie Kostecki	Dick Johnson Racing	Report
8	23	Perth Super 440	(New Zealand) Matt Payne	(Australia) Broc Feeney	(New Zealand) Matt Payne	Grove Racing	Report
8	24	Perth Super 440	(New Zealand) Matt Payne	(Australia) Broc Feeney	(Australia) Broc Feeney	Triple Eight Race Engineering	Report
8	25	Perth Super 440	(Australia) Broc Feeney	(Australia) Kai Allen	(New Zealand) Matt Payne	Grove Racing	Report
9	26	Ipswich Super 440	(New Zealand) Matt Payne	(Australia) Broc Feeney	(Australia) Brodie Kostecki	Dick Johnson Racing	Report
9	27	Ipswich Super 440	(New Zealand) Matt Payne	(Australia) Will Brown	(Australia) Will Brown	Triple Eight Race Engineering	Report
9	28	Ipswich Super 440	(Australia) Will Brown	(Australia) Brodie Kostecki	(Australia) Broc Feeney	Triple Eight Race Engineering	Report
Enduro Cup
10	29	The Bend 500	(Australia) Brodie Kostecki	(Australia) Will Brown	(Australia) Chaz Mostert (New Zealand) Fabian Coulthard	Walkinshaw TWG Racing	Report
11	30	Bathurst 1000	(Australia) Zach Bates	(Australia) Brodie Kostecki	(Australia) Brodie Kostecki (Australia) Todd Hazelwood	Dick Johnson Racing	Report
Finals Series
Round of 10
12	31	Gold Coast 500	(Australia) Broc Feeney	(New Zealand) Andre Heimgartner	(Australia) Chaz Mostert	Walkinshaw TWG Racing	Report
12	32	Gold Coast 500	(Australia) Broc Feeney	(Australia) Chaz Mostert	(Australia) Broc Feeney	Triple Eight Race Engineering	Report
Round of 7
13	33	Sandown 500	(New Zealand) Matt Payne	(New Zealand) Matt Payne	(Australia) Brodie Kostecki	Dick Johnson Racing	Report
13	34	Sandown 500	(New Zealand) Matt Payne	(Australia) Chaz Mostert	(New Zealand) Matt Payne	Grove Racing	Report
Grand Final 4
14	35	Adelaide Grand Final					Report
14	36	Adelaide Grand Final					Report
14	37	Adelaide Grand Final					Report

=== Points system ===
Points were awarded for each race at an event, to the driver or drivers of a car that completed at least 75% of the race distance and was running at the completion of the race. At least 50% of the planned race distance must be completed for the result to be valid and championship points awarded.

Points format		Position																														
Points format		1st	2nd	3rd	4th	5th	6th	7th	8th	9th	10th	11th	12th	13th	14th	15th	16th	17th	18th	19th	20th	21st	22nd	23rd	24th	25th	26th	27th	28th	29th	30th	FL
Rounds 1, 6–7	Race 1	60	55	51	47	43	40	36	33	31	28	26	24	22	20	19	17	16	15	13	12	11	10	9	8	7	6	5	4	3	2	5
Rounds 1, 6–7	Race 2 & 3	120	110	102	93	86	79	73	67	62	57	52	48	44	41	37	34	32	29	27	25	23	21	19	18	16	15	14	13	12	11	5
Round 2	All races	75	69	63	58	54	49	45	42	38	35	33	30	28	25	23	21	20	18	17	15	14	13	12	11	10	9	8	7	6	5	5
Rounds 3–5, 8–9	Race 1 & 2	80	74	68	62	57	53	49	45	41	38	35	32	29	27	25	23	21	19	18	16	15	14	13	12	11	10	9	8	7	6	5
Rounds 3–5, 8–9	Race 3	140	129	118	109	100	92	85	78	72	66	61	56	51	47	44	40	37	34	31	29	26	24	22	21	19	17	16	15	14	12	5
Rounds 10–11	Enduro race	300	276	254	234	215	198	182	167	154	142	130	120	110	101	93	86	79	73	67	62	57	52	48	44	41	37	34	32	29	27	
Rounds 12–13	All races	150	138	127	117	107	99	91	84	77	71	65	60	55	51	47	43	40	36	33	31	28	26	24	22	20	19	17	16	15	13	
Round 14	Race 1	50	46	42	39	36	33	30	28	26	24	22	20	18	17	16	14	13	12	11	10	9	9	8	7	6	5	4	3	2	1	
Round 14	Race 2 & 3	125	115	106	97	90	82	76	70	64	59	54	50	46	42	39	36	33	30	28	26	24	22	20	18	17	16	14	13	12	11	

- Rounds 1 and 6–7: Used for the Sydney 500, Darwin Triple Crown, and Townsville 500. Race 1 is 100km and Races 2 & 3 are 200km.
- Round 2: Used for the Melbourne SuperSprint. All four races are approximately 100km.
- Rounds 3–5 and 8–9: Used for the Taupō Super 440, Christchurch Super 440, Tasmania Super 440, Perth Super 440 and Ipswich Super 440. Races 1 & 2 are 120km and Race 3 is 200km.
- Rounds 10–11: Used for The Bend 500 and Bathurst 1000.
- Rounds 12–13: Used for the Gold Coast 500 and Sandown 500. Both races are 250km.
- Round 14: Used for the Adelaide Grand Final. Race 1 is 100km and Races 2 & 3 are 250km.

=== Driver's Championship ===
Eliminated after the Gold Coast 500 round
Eliminated after the Sandown 500 round

Pos	Driver	No.	Sprint Cup																												Enduro Cup		Finals Series					Pen.	Points
Pos	Driver	No.	SMP			MEL				TAU		CHC				SYM			HID			TOW			BAR			QLD			BEN	BAT	SUR		SAN		ADE	Pen.	Points
1	(New Zealand) Matt Payne	19	4	3	2	2	2	Ret	20	5	5	4	19	1	1	8	3	2	3	4	2	3	1	2	1	2	1	2	6	Ret	6	5	3	6	2	1		0	5150
2	(Australia) Brodie Kostecki	17	10	2	12	1	1	2	1	1	6	2	1	5	18	3	24	12	4	3	DNS	2	3	1	24	6	12	1	2	2	16	1	7	2	1	10		0	5120
3	(Australia) Broc Feeney (SC)	88	1	6	1	3	7	1	Ret	4	2	10	5	2	3	4	2	1	14	7	5	10	8	6	7	1	2	4	3	1	23	11	9	1	11	4		0	5096
4	(Australia) Chaz Mostert	1	15	DSQ	4	5	14	5	8	7	3	8	13	12	17	1	20	9	7	6	Ret	5	7	4	5	4	4	6	5	Ret	1	Ret	1	3	4	5		0	5078
Finals Series cut-off																																							
Pos	Driver	No.	SMP			MEL				TAU		CHC				SYM			HID			TOW			BAR			QLD			BEN	BAT	SUR		SAN		ADE	Pen.	Points
5	(Australia) Will Brown (EC)	888	7	14	18	8	21	21	2	2	4	17	4	13	6	9	4	5	5	5	4	7	6	8	12	5	17	3	1	3	4	2	6	11	20	7		0	2432
6	(Australia) Cameron Waters	6	5	4	3	6	4	3	6	21	9	7	7	8	5	12	7	10	1	2	3	1	4	3	4	9	4	8	7	7	14	15	8	7	3	15		0	2404
7	(Australia) Anton De Pasquale	18	6	1	15	9	10	6	12	8	10	5	6	6	11	6	5	4	6	8	1	14	2	13	3	11	3	13	10	6	7	Ret	4	14	6	2		0	2284
8	(Australia) Kai Allen	26	11	8	23	11	5	4	9	23	8	1	2	7	2	19	6	3	2	1	6	4	12	7	6	3	5	5	4	4	2	20	24	13	22	18		0	2270
9	(New Zealand) Ryan Wood	2	21	7	5	7	3	18	21	3	1	3	3	4	Ret	14	8	8	8	Ret	7	8	26	5	2	8	Ret	9	14	13	3	24	14	4	17	16		0	1889
10	(New Zealand) Andre Heimgartner	8	8	Ret	9	14	9	9	15	12	12	13	23	15	8	5	1	14	11	14	11	15	16	Ret	8	7	11	12	11	14	8	7	5	5	8	8		0	1815
11	(Australia) Jack Le Brocq	4	17	9	6	13	6	10	4	9	11	15	12	9	7	17	11	24	24	9	8	11	9	9	11	13	15	21	13	20	10	4	22	21	16	11		0	1709
12	(Australia) James Golding	7	3	10	24	4	13	19	5	6	7	6	15	3	4	13	12	13	18	11	14	12	22	17	15	15	14	11	21	5	DSQ	8	13	8	5	17		0	1679
13	(Australia) Thomas Randle	55	9	13	8	12	8	Ret	3	19	13	11	14	17	19	15	10	11	15	12	DNS	6	5	11	9	10	10	10	9	11	11	9	23	10	19	6		0	1631
14	(Australia) Jayden Ojeda	31	13	21	19	16	18	13	7	18	14	12	8	11	14	10	14	6	9	10	13	9	11	10	20	18	8	18	24	18	5	12	10	19	13	9		0	1599
15	(Australia) David Reynolds	20	12	5	16	15	19	7	17	10	19	Ret	21	19	13	2	17	16	23	17	10	16	10	12	19	15	9	20	8	9	22	17	2	22	18	13		0	1369
16	(Australia) Zach Bates	10	14	17	13	19	17	14	Ret	17	17	9	10	14	15	11	13	20	16	22	21	23	14	14	22	22	22	19	23	16	12	3	12	18	10	12		0	1296
17	(Australia) Cooper Murray	36/99	Ret	18	20	10	23	22	Ret	13	20	19	16	18	9	Ret	18	21	13	18	20	13	13	19	13	19	13	14	26	12	18	6	11	17	7	3		0	1295
18	(Australia) Cameron Hill	14	16	11	7	18	11	8	13	11	16	Ret	24	16	12	7	9	19	12	19	9	19	25	20	14	20	19	17	15	15	17	14	18	9	21	19		0	1219
19	(Australia) Rylan Gray	38	20	20	11	17	15	17	14	15	21	14	11	10	Ret	18	16	23	21	13	17	17	17	15	10	17	23	7	25	8	9	22	17	15	15	23		25	1126
20	(Australia) Aaron Cameron	3	2	15	17	23	24	20	19	20	15 (Note: Aaron Cameron was stripped of his Race 9 points but kept his 15th-place finish due to a technical infringement.)	20	9	21	Ret	23	15	7	17	21	16	20	15	Ret	16	21	7	16	12	10	DSQ	13	20	12	Ret	21		44	992
21	(Australia) Macauley Jones	96	22	22	10	21	20	11	10	16	18	22	18	23	16	20	19	15	10	16	15	24	19	Ret	23	23	21	24	18	24	20	21	16	23	9	14		0	962
22	(Australia) Jackson Walls	11	18	19	14	24	16	12	16	22	Ret	21	22	24	21	22	21	18	22	20	23	18	18	16	17	24	20	15	17	17	19	23	15	20	23	24		0	835
23	(Australia) Jobe Stewart	9	23	16	22	20	22	16	18	Ret	22	16	17	20	20	21	22	22	19	23	19	22	20	18	18	16	18	22	Ret	21	15	16	21	Ret	14	22		0	830
24	(Australia) Declan Fraser	777	19	12	21	22	12	15	11	14	23	18	20	22	10	16	23	17	20	15	18	21	21	21	21	12	16	23	16	19	Ret	18						0	788
25	(Australia) Todd Hazelwood	17																			12										16	1						0	441
26	(Australia) Aaron Seton	10/30																				26	23	22				26	20	22	12	3						0	438
27	(Australia) Jarrod Hughes	9/99																													15	16	19	16	12	20		0	354
28	(Australia) Reuben Goodall	5/55																				25	24	23	9						11	9						0	328
29	(Australia) Bayley Hall	15																										27	19	25	13	10						0	309
30	(Australia) Craig Lowndes	15																													13	10						0	262
31	(Australia) Mark Winterbottom	6/55																			22										14	15						0	224
32	(Australia) Ben Gomersall	5																										25	22	23	22							0	220
33	(Australia) James Moffat	34																														19						0	67
Pos	Driver	No.	SMP			MEL				TAU		CHC				SYM			HID			TOW			BAR			QLD			BEN	BAT	SUR		SAN		ADE	Pen.	Points

=== Teams' Championship ===
Pos.	Team	No.	SMP			MEL				TAU		CHC				SYM			HID			TOW			BAR			QLD			BEN	BAT	SUR		SAN	ADE	Pen.	Points
1	Grove Racing	19	4	3	2	2	2	Ret	20	5	5	4	19	1	1	8	3	2	3	4	2	3	1	2	1	2	1	2	6	Ret	6	5	3	6			60	4864
1	Grove Racing	26	11	8	23	11	5	4	9	23	8	1	2	7	2	19	6	3	2	1	6	4	12	7	6	3	5	5	4	4	2	20	24	13			60	4864
2	Triple Eight Race Engineering	88	1	6	1	3	7	1	Ret	4	2	10	5	2	3	4	2	1	14	7	5	10	8	6	7	1	2	4	3	1	23	11	9	1			60	4762
2	Triple Eight Race Engineering	888	7	14	18	8	21	21	2	2	4	17	4	13	6	9	4	5	5	5	4	7	6	8	12	5	17	3	1	3	4	2	6	11			60	4762
3	Tickford Racing	6	5	4	3	6	4	3	6	21	9	7	7	8	5	12	7	10	1	2	3	1	4	3	4	9	4	8	7	7	14	15	8	7			0	3750
3	Tickford Racing	55	9	13	8	13	8	Ret	3	19	13	11	14	17	19	15	10	11	15	12	22	6	5	11	9	10	10	10	9	11	11	9	23	10			0	3750
4	Walkinshaw TWG Racing	1	15	DSQ	4	5	14	5	8	7	3	8	13	12	17	1	20	9	7	6	Ret	5	7	4	5	4	4	6	5	Ret	1	Ret	1	3			80	3716
4	Walkinshaw TWG Racing	2	21	7	5	7	3	18	21	3	1	3	3	4	Ret	14	8	8	8	Ret	7	8	26	5	2	8	Ret	9	14	13	3	24	14	4			80	3716
5	Dick Johnson Racing	17	10	2	12	1	1	2	1	1	6	2	1	5	18	3	24	12	4	3	12	2	3	1	24	6	12	1	2	2	16	1	7	2			30	3598
5	Dick Johnson Racing	38	20	20	11	17	15	17	14	15	21	14	11	10	Ret	18	16	23	21	13	17	17	17	15	10	17	23	7	25	8	9	22	17	15			30	3598
6	Team 18	18	6	1	15	9	10	6	12	8	10	5	6	6	11	6	5	4	6	8	1	14	2	13	3	11	3	13	18	6	7	Ret	4	14			0	3325
6	Team 18	20/48	12	5	16	15	19	7	17	10	19	Ret	21	19	13	2	17	16	23	17	10	16	10	12	19	15	9	20	8	9	22	17	2	22			0	3325
7	Brad Jones Racing	8	8	Ret	9	14	9	9	15	12	12	13	23	15	8	5	1	14	11	14	11	15	16	Ret	8	7	11	12	11	14	8	7	5	5			0	2805
7	Brad Jones Racing	14	16	11	7	18	11	8	13	11	16	Ret	24	16	12	7	9	19	12	19	9	19	25	20	14	20	19	17	15	15	17	14	18	9			0	2805
8	Matt Stone Racing	4	17	9	6	13	6	10	4	9	11	15	12	9	7	17	11	24	24	9	8	11	9	9	11	13	15	21	13	20	10	4	22	21			90	2676
8	Matt Stone Racing	10	14	17	13	19	17	14	Ret	17	17	9	10	14	15	11	13	20	16	22	21	23	14	14	22	22	22	19	23	16	12	3	12	18			90	2676
9	Blanchard Racing Team	3	2	15	17	23	24	20	19	20	15	20	9	21	Ret	23	15	7	17	21	16	20	15	Ret	16	21	7	16	12	10	DSQ	13	20	12			104	2436
9	Blanchard Racing Team	7	3	10	24	4	13	19	5	6	7	6	15	3	4	13	12	13	18	11	14	12	22	17	15	15	14	11	21	5	DSQ	8	13	8			104	2436
10	PremiAir Racing	31	13	21	19	16	18	13	7	18	14	12	8	11	14	10	14	6	9	10	13	9	11	10	20	18	8	18	24	18	5	12	10	19			30	2330
10	PremiAir Racing	36/777	19	12	21	22	12	15	11	14	23	18	20	22	10	16	23	17	20	15	18	21	21	21	21	12	16	23	16	19	Ret	18	11	17			30	2330
11	Erebus Motorsport	9	23	16	22	20	22	16	18	Ret	22	16	17	20	20	21	22	22	19	23	19	22	20	18	18	16	18	22	Ret	21	15	16	21	Ret			30	1771
11	Erebus Motorsport	99	Ret	18	20	10	23	22	Ret	13	20	19	16	18	9	Ret	18	21	13	18	20	13	13	19	13	19	13	14	26	12	18	6	19	16			30	1771
12	Brad Jones Racing	96	22	22	10	21	20	11	10	16	18	22	18	23	16	20	19	15	10	16	15	24	19	Ret	23	23	21	24	18	24	20	21	16	23			0	834
13	Triple Eight Race Engineering	11	18	19	14	24	16	12	16	22	Ret	21	22	24	21	22	21	18	22	20	23	18	18	16	17	24	20	15	17	17	19	23	15	20			0	789
14	Team 18 (w)	15																										27	19	25	13	10					0	309
15	Tickford Racing (w)	5																				25	24	23				25	22	23	21						0	149
16	Matt Stone Racing (w)	30																				26	23	22				26	20	22							0	98
N/A	Garry Rogers Motorsport (w)	34																														19					0	67
Pos.	Team	No.	SMP			MEL				TAU		CHC				SYM			HID			TOW			BAR			QLD			BEN	BAT	SUR		SAN	ADE	Pen.	Points

- (w) denotes wildcard entry.
