= Lochie Dalton =

Australian racing driver

- Nationality: Australian
- Born: Lachlan Tate Dalton; 27 May 2002 (age 24) Launceston, Tasmania, Australia

Supercars Championship
- Years active: 2024
- Teams: Tickford Racing
- Starts: 7
- Wins: 0
- Poles: 0
- Fastest laps: 0

Previous series
- 2021 2022–2023 2022–2024: Toyota Gazoo Racing Australia 86 Series; Australian National Trans-Am Series; Super2 Series

Lachlan Tate "Lochie" Dalton (born 27 May 2002) is a racing driver from Australia who currently competes in the Super2 Series for Blanchard Racing Team.

== Racing record ==
=== Karting career summary ===
| Season | Series | Position |
|---|---|---|
| 2017 | Australian National Sprint Kart Championship - KA2 | 8th |
| 2017 | Australian Kart Championship - KZ2 | 7th |
| 2018 | Australian National Sprint Kart Championship - KA1 | 1st |
| 2019 | Australian National Sprint Kart Championship - X30 | 13th |
| 2019 | Race of Stars - KZ2 | 19th |
| 2019 | SP Tools Australian Kart Championship - KZ2 | 4th |
| 2021 | Ian Harrington Memorial Rising Star - Opens | 2nd |
| 2022 | Bec Wyatt Memorial - KA3 Senior Medium | 2nd |

=== Circuit career results ===
| Season | Series | Position | Car | Team |
|---|---|---|---|---|
| 2021 | Toyota Gazoo Racing Australia 86 Series | – | Toyota 86 Mk.1 | Sieders Racing Team |
| 2022 | Australian National Trans-Am Series | 6th | Ford Mustang | Garry Rogers Motorsport |
| 2022 | Super2 Series | 21st | Holden Commodore VF | Brad Jones Racing |
| 2023 | Australian National Trans-Am Series | 2nd | Ford Mustang | Andrew Walter Construction |
| 2023 | Super2 Series | 10th | Holden Commodore ZB | Brad Jones Racing |
| 2024 | Super2 Series | 9th | Ford Mustang S550 | Tickford Racing |
| 2024 | Supercars Championship | 53rd | Ford Mustang S650 | Tickford Racing |

=== Super2 Series results ===
(key) (Race results only)

Super2 Series results
| Year | Team | No. | Car | 1 | 2 | 3 | 4 | 5 | 6 | 7 | 8 | 9 | 10 | 11 | 12 | Position | Points |
|---|---|---|---|---|---|---|---|---|---|---|---|---|---|---|---|---|---|
| 2022 | Brad Jones Racing | 8 | Holden VF Commodore | SMP; R1 | SMP; R2 | BAR; R3 | BAR; R4 | TOW; R5 | TOW; R6 | SAN; R7 | SAN; R8 | BAT; R9 | BAT; R10 | ADE; R11; 12 | ADE; R12; 8 | 21st | 159 |
| 2023 | Brad Jones Racing | 43 | Holden ZB Commodore | NEW; R1; 12 | NEW; R2; DNS | BAR; R3; 4 | BAR; R4; 5 | TOW; R5; 19 | TOW; R6; 12 | SAN; R7; 14 | SAN; R8; 15 | BAT; R9; 7 | BAT; R10; 8 | ADE; R11; 7 | ADE; R12; 15 | 10th | 885 |
| 2024 | Tickford Racing | 6 | Ford Mustang S550 | BAT1; R1; 7 | BAT1; R2; 5 | BAR; R3; 10 | BAR; R4; 14 | TOW; R5; 9 | TOW; R6; 11 | SAN; R7; 15 | SAN; R8; 10 | BAT2; R9; 8 | BAT2; R10; 11 | ADE; R11; 10 | ADE; R12; 10 | 9th | 870 |
| 2025 | Tickford Racing | 6 | Ford Mustang S550 | SMP; R1; 8 | SMP; R2; 12 | SYM; R3; 20 | SYM; R4; 4 | TOW; R5; 1 | TOW; R6; 1 | QLD; R7; 4 | QLD; R8; 3 | BAT; R9; 1 | BAT; R10; 3 | ADE; R11; 8 | ADE; R12; 3 | 2nd | 1371 |
| 2026 | Blanchard Racing Team | 43 | Ford Mustang S550 | SMP; R1; 5 | SMP; R2; 1 | HID; R3; 4 | HID; R4; 1 | BAR; R5; 1 | BAR; R6; 8 | BAT; R9; 1 | BAT; R10; 2 | SAN; R7 | SAN; R8 | ADE; R11 | ADE; R12 | 1st* | 1059* |

=== Supercars Championship results ===
Supercars results
| Year | Team | No. | Car | 1 | 2 | 3 | 4 | 5 | 6 | 7 | 8 | 9 | 10 | 11 | 12 | 13 | 14 | 15 | 16 | 17 | 18 | 19 | 20 | 21 | 22 | 23 | 24 | 25 | 26 | 27 | 28 | 29 | 30 | 31 | 32 | 33 | 34 | 35 | 36 | 37 | Position | Points |
|---|---|---|---|---|---|---|---|---|---|---|---|---|---|---|---|---|---|---|---|---|---|---|---|---|---|---|---|---|---|---|---|---|---|---|---|---|---|---|---|---|---|---|
| 2024 | Tickford Racing | 5 | Ford Mustang S650 | BAT1; R1 | BAT1; R2 | MEL; R3 | MEL; R4 | MEL; R5 | MEL; R6 | TAU; R7 | TAU; R8 | BAR; R9 | BAR; R10 | HID; R11 | HID; R12 | TOW; R13 | TOW; R14 | SMP; R15; 22 | SMP; R16; 24 | BEN; R17 | BEN; R18 | SAN; R19 | BAT; R20 | SUR; R21 | SUR; R22 | ADE; R23 | ADE; R24 | | | | | | | | | | | | | | 53rd | 72 |
| 2025 | Tickford Racing | 5 | Ford Mustang S650 | SYD; R1 | SYD; R2 | SYD; R3 | MEL; R4 | MEL; R5 | MEL; R6 | MEL; R7 | TAU; R8 | TAU; R9 | TAU; R10 | SYM; R11 | SYM; R12 | SYM; R13 | BAR; R14; 23 | BAR; R15; 21 | BAR; R16; 21 | HID; R17 | HID; R18 | HID; R19 | TOW; R20 | TOW; R21 | TOW; R22 | QLD; R23 | QLD; R24 | QLD; R25 | BEN; R26; 22 | BAT; R27; 13 | SUR; R28 | SUR; R29 | SAN; R30 | SAN; R31 | ADE; R32 | ADE; R33 | ADE; R34 | | | | 30th | 216 |
| 2026 | Erebus Motorsport | 99 | Chevrolet Camaro ZL1 | SMP; R1 | SMP; R2 | SMP; R3 | MEL; R4 | MEL; R5 | MEL; R6 | MEL; R7 | TAU; R8 | TAU; R9 | TAU; R10 | CHR; R11 | CHR; R12 | CHR; R13 | SYM; R14 | SYM; R15 | SYM; R16 | BAR; R17 | BAR; R18 | BAR; R19 | HID; R20 | HID; R21 | HID; R22 | TOW; R23 | TOW; R24 | TOW; R25 | QLD; R26 | QLD; R27 | QLD; R28 | BEN; R29 | BAT; R30 | SUR; R31 | SUR; R32 | SAN; R33 | SAN; R34 | ADE; R35 | ADE; R36 | ADE; R37 | | |
