= Perth Super 440 =

Supercars Championship event held in Wanneroo, Western Australia

(Western Australia) Perth Super 440
- Race Information
Venue	Wanneroo Raceway
Number of times held	47
First held	1973
- Race Format
- Race 1
Laps	50
Distance	120 km
- Race 2
Laps	50
Distance	120 km
- Race 3
Laps	83
Distance	200 km
- Last Event (2026)
- Overall Winner
(New Zealand) Matthew Payne	Grove Racing
- Race Winners
(New Zealand) Matthew Payne	Grove Racing
(Australia) Broc Feeney	Triple Eight Race Engineering
(New Zealand) Matthew Payne	Grove Racing

The Perth Super 440 is the current name of the annual motor racing event for Supercars, held at Wanneroo Raceway in Wanneroo, Western Australia. The event has been a regular part of the Supercars Championship and its predecessor, the Australian Touring Car Championship, since 1973.

== Format ==
The event is staged over a three-day weekend, from Friday to Sunday. One single ninety-minute practice session is held on Friday. On Saturday then, a three-stage knockout qualifying session is held which decides the grid positions for the following 100 kilometre race. Two separated fifteen-minute qualifying sessions are held on Sunday, which decide the grid for the following 100 km races.

== History ==
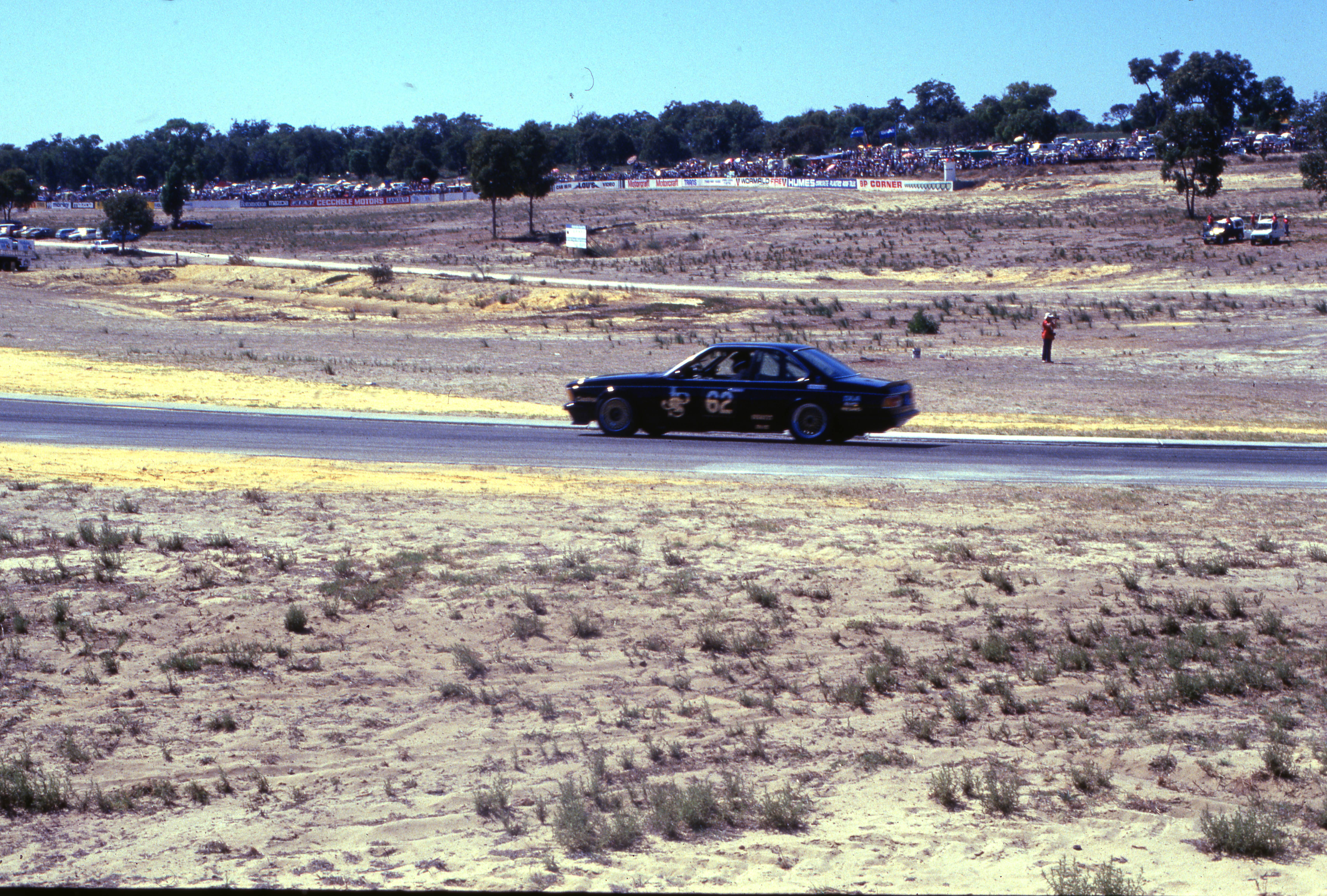
Jim Richards won the 1985 event.

Wanneroo Park Raceway, as it was then known, hosted its first round of the Australian Touring Car Championship (ATCC) in 1973, with Allan Moffat taking the first of his three event victories over Peter Brock. It was the first ATCC event ever held in Western Australia and featured the only appearance of a Subaru in the history of the ATCC. The championship did not return to Wanneroo until 1978. The event that year consisted of two heats and the Holden Dealer Team scored a rare 1-2-3 finish in the overall results, with Brock taking victory, from 12th on the grid, over team-mates John Harvey and Wayne Negus. Allan Grice won the event in 1980 and 1982 despite only completing partial championship campaigns in each year.

During practice for the 1983 event, Moffat found that his Mazda RX-7 struggled on the rises in the circuit compared to the other cars. To compensate for this, he started the race with the petrol tank only half-filled and made a pit stop during the race. The strategy worked and Moffat took victory, despite almost colliding with Brock when the latter spun in the closing stages. Moffat's Mazda won again in 1984, the final win for the four-time series champion. Under Group A regulations, from 1985 to 1992, the event was dominated by Nissan Skylines and Ford Sierras, with Gibson Motorsport's Nissans taking three wins and Fords of Dick Johnson Racing and Mobil 1 Racing taking four combined. This included Mark Skaife took his first ATCC round victory in the 1991 event for Nissan. Ahead of the 1993 event, the circuit was renamed from Wanneroo Park to Barbagallo Raceway due to a sponsorship from Alf Barbagallo, a name which remained until 2020. Alan Jones won the 1994 round on the same weekend that he was fined for throwing a punch at an official.

The Holden Racing Team controlled the event from 1996 to 2000, taking victory in all five years. Craig Lowndes won all twelve races across the 1996, 1998, 1999 and 2000 events, having missed the 1997 event as he was racing overseas. Brock took his final ATCC round victory in that 1997 weekend despite not winning any of the races during the event. That event included the closest race finish in event history with Larry Perkins holding off John Bowe. Paul Radisich interrupted the Holden Racing Team's success in 2001, winning for Dick Johnson Racing in a dominant weekend that saw him take pole, lead every lap and secure three fastest laps across the three races. In 2002, Jason Bright returned the Holden team to the top step of the podium. Bright won again in 2004 for Paul Weel Racing, before Steven Richards won consecutive events at the circuit in 2005 and 2006 despite only winning one of the six races in the two years. In the second race of the 2005 event, Skaife and Marcos Ambrose, who had started together on the front row, both ended up in the gravel trap at the first turn of the race. While Skaife retired, Ambrose managed to drive out and finished fifth despite a drive-through penalty being issued during the race, before he was then given a further points penalty post-race for the same incident.

In this period, discussions were held about moving the event to a street circuit in Perth, and Barbagallo dropped off the 2010 calendar due to dated facilities. The Government of Western Australia resisted moving the event and Wanneroo was instead upgraded, with the circuit returning to the calendar in 2011 and a new pit and paddock complex being built for 2012. The 2011 event saw one of the biggest accidents in the history of the championship take place. Karl Reindler, 13th on the grid, stalled at the start and was hit by Steve Owen, who had started 25th and was travelling at 150 km/h. The impact ruptured the fuel tank in Reindler's car, engulfing both cars in flames. Reindler suffered superficial burns to his hands and face as well as smoke inhalation, while Owen escaped serious injury. In the same race, Jason Bright took the first championship victory for Brad Jones Racing, the team that also prepared Reindler's entry.

Lowndes took his 91st career race victory in the ATCC and Supercars Championship during the 2013 event, breaking Skaife's previous record of 90. In 2014, Scott McLaughlin gave Volvo its first race victory in its return to the series, having last competed in 1986. Lowndes took his 16th and final Barbagallo race win in the Saturday race in 2016, opting to make an additional pitstop to most other cars and moving up from 22nd at pit exit to take the victory. The two other Triple Eight Race Engineering entries of Shane van Gisbergen and Jamie Whincup completed the podium in a repeat of the Holden Dealer Team feat of 1978. From 2017 to 2019, McLaughlin won three consecutive events, including winning the Sunday race in 2018 from 19th on the grid, a record at the circuit.

The event was reformatted in 2019 to become a SuperNight event with races on Friday and Saturday night for the first time at the circuit. The 2020 event, again due to be held at night, was postponed indefinitely due to the COVID-19 pandemic. The event was later rescheduled to the end of October, however as a daylight event, before being cancelled altogether in August 2020. The 2021 event suffered the same fate and was again cancelled before the event returned for 2022. From 2023, the event returned to a daytime format. In 2025, the circuit became the first to host 100 championship races, with the 99th and 100th races won by Broc Feeney.

The event is scheduled to be held at Wanneroo for the final time in 2027 with the Western Australian round scheduled to be held at the Perth Park from 2028.

== Winners ==
Year	Driver	Team	Car	Report
1973	(Canada) Allan Moffat	Ford	Ford XY Falcon GTHO Phase III	
1974 – 1977	not held			
1978	(Australia) Peter Brock	Holden Dealer Team	Holden LX Torana SS A9X	
1979	(Australia) Peter Brock	Holden Dealer Team	Holden LX Torana SS A9X	
1980	(Australia) Allan Grice	Craven Mild Racing	Holden LX Torana SS A9X	
1981	(Australia) Peter Brock	Holden Dealer Team	Holden VC Commodore	
1982	(Australia) Allan Grice	Re-Car Racing	Holden VH Commodore SS	
1983	(Canada) Allan Moffat	Allan Moffat Racing	Mazda RX-7	
1984	(Canada) Allan Moffat	Allan Moffat Racing	Mazda RX-7	
1985	(New Zealand) Jim Richards	JPS Team BMW	BMW 635 CSi	
1986	(Australia) George Fury	Gibson Motorsport	Nissan Skyline DR30 RS	
1987	(Australia) Glenn Seton	Gibson Motorsport	Nissan Skyline DR30 RS	
1988	(Australia) Dick Johnson	Dick Johnson Racing	Ford Sierra RS500	
1989	(Australia) John Bowe	Dick Johnson Racing	Ford Sierra RS500	
1990	(Australia) Peter Brock	Mobil 1 Racing	Ford Sierra RS500	
1991	(Australia) Mark Skaife	Gibson Motorsport	Nissan Skyline R32 GT-R	
1992	(Australia) John Bowe	Dick Johnson Racing	Ford Sierra RS500	
1993	(New Zealand) Jim Richards	Gibson Motorsport	Holden VP Commodore	
1994	(Australia) Alan Jones	Glenn Seton Racing	Ford EB Falcon	Report
1995	(Australia) Glenn Seton	Glenn Seton Racing	Ford EF Falcon	
1996	(Australia) Craig Lowndes	Holden Racing Team	Holden VR Commodore	
1997	(Australia) Peter Brock	Holden Racing Team	Holden VS Commodore	
1998	(Australia) Craig Lowndes	Holden Racing Team	Holden VS Commodore	
1999	(Australia) Craig Lowndes	Holden Racing Team	Holden VT Commodore	
2000	(Australia) Craig Lowndes	Holden Racing Team	Holden VT Commodore	
2001	(New Zealand) Paul Radisich	Dick Johnson Racing	Ford AU Falcon	Report
2002	(Australia) Jason Bright	Holden Racing Team	Holden VX Commodore	
2003	(Australia) Marcos Ambrose	Stone Brothers Racing	Ford BA Falcon	
2004	(Australia) Jason Bright	Paul Weel Racing	Holden VY Commodore	
2005	(New Zealand) Steven Richards	Perkins Engineering	Holden VY Commodore	
2006	(New Zealand) Steven Richards	Perkins Engineering	Holden VZ Commodore	
2007	(Australia) Garth Tander	HSV Dealer Team	Holden VE Commodore	Report
2008	(Australia) Mark Winterbottom	Ford Performance Racing	Ford BF Falcon	Report
2009	(Australia) Jamie Whincup	Triple Eight Race Engineering	Ford FG Falcon	Report
2010	not held			
2011	(Australia) Jamie Whincup	Triple Eight Race Engineering	Holden VE Commodore	Report
2012	(Australia) Mark Winterbottom	Ford Performance Racing	Ford FG Falcon	Report
2013	(Australia) Jamie Whincup	Triple Eight Race Engineering	Holden VF Commodore	Report
2014	(Australia) Chaz Mostert	Ford Performance Racing	Ford FG Falcon	Report
2015	(Australia) Craig Lowndes	Triple Eight Race Engineering	Holden VF Commodore	Report
2016	(Australia) Craig Lowndes	Triple Eight Race Engineering	Holden VF Commodore	Report
2017	(New Zealand) Scott McLaughlin	DJR Team Penske	Ford FG X Falcon	Report
2018	(New Zealand) Scott McLaughlin	DJR Team Penske	Ford FG X Falcon	Report
2019	(New Zealand) Scott McLaughlin	DJR Team Penske	Ford Mustang GT	Report
2020 – 2021	not held due to COVID-19 pandemic			
2022	(New Zealand) Shane van Gisbergen	Triple Eight Race Engineering	Holden ZB Commodore	Report
2023	(Australia) Brodie Kostecki	Erebus Motorsport	Chevrolet Camaro ZL1-1LE	
2024	(Australia) Chaz Mostert	Walkinshaw Andretti United	Ford Mustang GT	
2025	(Australia) Broc Feeney	Triple Eight Race Engineering	Chevrolet Camaro ZL1-1LE	
2026	(New Zealand) Matthew Payne	Grove Racing	Ford Mustang GT	

== Multiple winners ==
=== By driver ===
Wins	Driver	Years
6	(Australia) Craig Lowndes	1996, 1998, 1999, 2000, 2015, 2016
5	(Australia) Peter Brock	1978, 1979, 1981, 1990, 1997
3	(Canada) Allan Moffat	1973, 1983, 1984
3	(Australia) Jamie Whincup	2009, 2011, 2013
3	(New Zealand) Scott McLaughlin	2017, 2018, 2019
2	(Australia) Allan Grice	1980, 1982
2	(Australia) John Bowe	1989, 1992
2	(New Zealand) Jim Richards	1985, 1993
2	(Australia) Glenn Seton	1987, 1995
2	(Australia) Jason Bright	2002, 2004
2	(New Zealand) Steven Richards	2005, 2006
2	(Australia) Mark Winterbottom	2008, 2012
2	(Australia) Chaz Mostert	2014, 2024

=== By team ===
Wins	Team
7	Dick Johnson Racing^{1}
7	Walkinshaw Andretti United^{2}
7	Triple Eight Race Engineering
4	Gibson Motorsport
4	Holden Dealer Team^{3}
3	Ford Performance Racing
2	Allan Moffat Racing
2	Glenn Seton Racing
2	Perkins Engineering

=== By manufacturer ===
Wins	Manufacturer
21	Holden
18	Ford
3	Nissan
2	Mazda
2	Chevrolet

Notes

- ^1 – Dick Johnson Racing was known as DJR Team Penske from 2015 to 2020, hence their statistics are combined.
- ^2 – Walkinshaw Andretti United was known as Holden Racing Team from 1990 to 2016, hence their statistics are combined.
- ^3 – Holden Dealer Team was known as Mobil 1 Racing from 1988 to 1990, hence their statistics are combined.

== Event names and sponsors ==
- 1973, 1978–80, 1984–85, 1987–92: Wanneroo
- 1981: Saab-Scania Trophy
- 1982: Walpamur Cup
- 1983: Saab-Scania Cup
- 1986: Motorcraft 100
- 1993–2001, 2004: Barbagallo
- 2002–03: VB 300
- 2005, 2014: Perth 400
- 2006: Perth V8 400
- 2007–08: BigPond 400
- 2009: BigPond 300
- 2011–12: Trading Post Perth Challenge
- 2013: Chill Perth 360
- 2015: Ubet Perth Super Sprint
- 2016–18: Perth SuperSprint
- 2019: Pirtek Perth SuperNight
- 2022: Bunnings Trade Perth SuperNight
- 2023–24: Bosch Power Tools Perth SuperSprint
- 2025–26: Bosch Power Tools Perth Super 440

== See also ==
- List of Australian Touring Car Championship races
