= Zane Goddard =

Australian racing driver

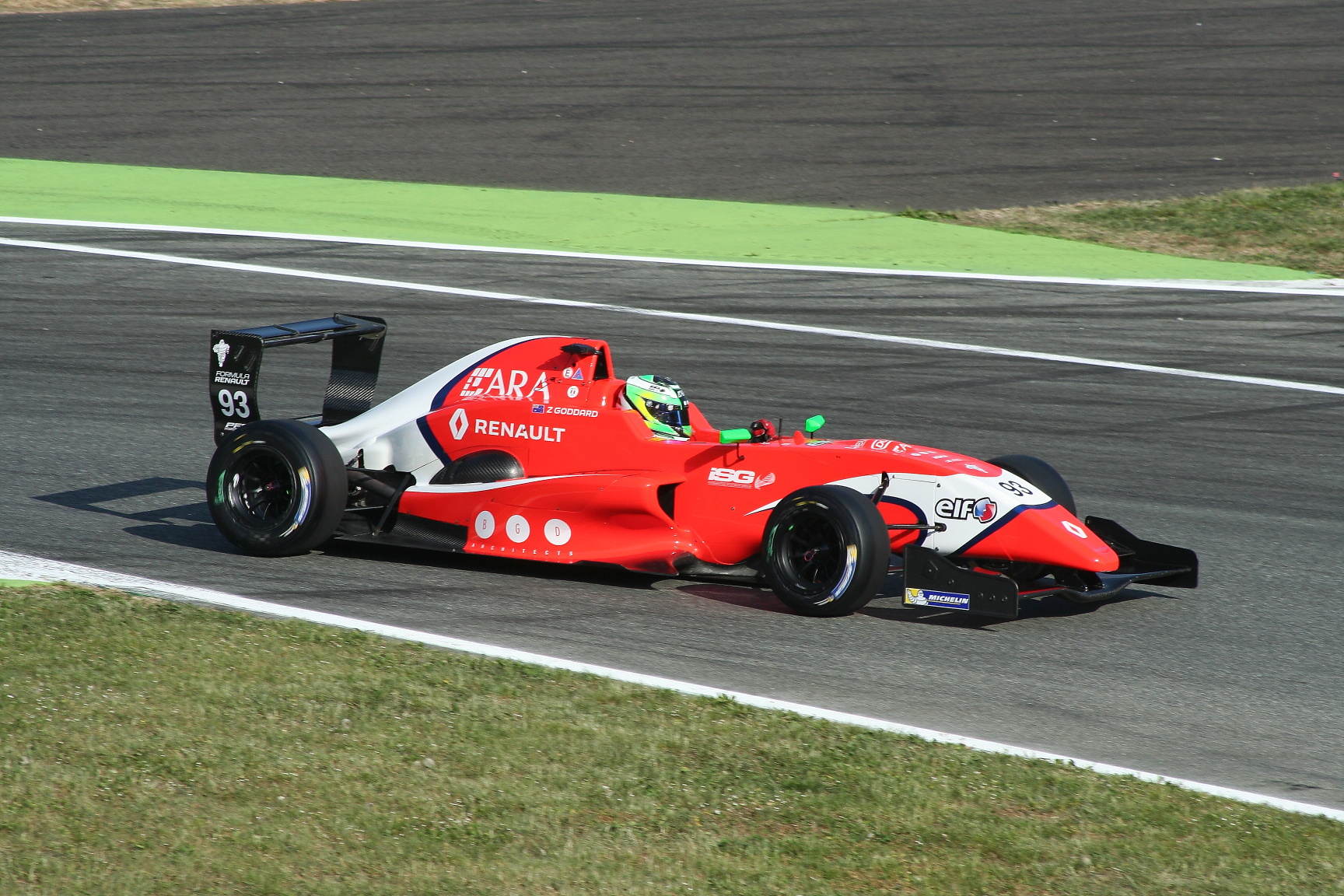
- Nationality: Australian
- Born: 13 October 1999 (age 27) Gold Coast, Queensland

Supercars Championship career
- Debut season: 2020
- Former teams: Triple Eight Race Engineering; Matt Stone Racing; Tickford Racing
- Starts: 51
- Wins: 0
- Podiums: 0
- Poles: 0
- Fastest laps: 0
- Best finish: 20th in 2021

Previous series
- 2015-2016 2016 2017 2018-2019 2020-2023 2022-2023: Formula 4 Australia; Formula 4 GB; Formula Renault Eurocup; Super2 Series; Supercars Championship; S5000 Australia

Zane Goddard (born 13 October 1999) is an Australian former professional racing driver who competed for 15 years. He last competed in the Repco Supercars Championship, where he drove for Triple Eight Race Engineering as a co-driver alongside Craig Lowndes in the No. 888 Chevrolet Camaro.

== Racing record ==
=== Karting career summary ===
Season	Series	Position
2010	Young Guns Karting Titles - Midgets	**1st**
2010	Queensland Karting Championship - Midgets	6th
2013	SKUSA SuperNationals XVII - Rotax Junior	11th
2014	Rotax Max Challenge Grand Finals - Junior Max	12th

=== Career summary ===
Season	Series	Team	Races	Wins	Poles	F/Laps	Podiums	Points	Position
2015	Australian Formula 4 Championship	Team BRM	21	0	0	0	1	81	9th
2016	Australian Formula 4 Championship	Dream Motorsport	3	0	0	0	0	16	13th
2016	F4 British Championship	Double R Racing	30	4	2	4	8	239	8th
2017	Formula Renault Eurocup	Arden	22	0	0	0	0	5	20th
2017	Formula Renault NEC	Arden Motorsport	3	0	0	0	0	0	NC†
2018	Super2 Series	Brad Jones Racing	15	0	0	0	0	835	14th
2019	Super2 Series	MW Motorsport	14	0	2	1	4	1347	4th
2020	Supercars Championship	Matt Stone Racing	15	0	0	0	0	438	25th
2021	Supercars Championship	Matt Stone Racing	30	0	0	0	0	1088	20th
2022	S5000 Australian Drivers' Championship	Team BRM	6	0	0	0	1	107	9th
2022	Supercars Championship	Tickford Racing	1	0	0	0	0	0	NC
2023	S5000 Australian Drivers' Championship	Team BRM	3	0	0	0	0	44	16th
2023	Supercars Championship	Triple Eight Race Engineering	5	0	0	0	0	298	37th

† As Goddard was a guest driver, he was ineligible for points

=== Complete Australian Formula 4 Championship results ===
(key) (Races in bold indicate pole position) (Races in italics indicate fastest lap)

Year	Team	1	2	3	4	5	6	7	8	9	10	11	12	13	14	15	16	17	18	19	20	21	DC	Points
2015	Team BRM	TOW; 1; 8	TOW; 2 Ret	TOW; 3; 10	QLD; 1; 10	QLD; 2; 11	QLD; 3; 10	SMP; 1; 6	SMP; 2; 7	SMP; 3; 5	SAN; 1 Ret	SAN; 2; 7	SAN; 3 Ret	SUR; 1; 8	SUR; 2 Ret	SUR; 3; 6	PHI; 1; 6	PHI; 2 Ret	PHI; 3; 2	SYD; 1 Ret	SYD; 2; 7	SYD; 3 Ret	9th	81
2016	Dream Motorsport	SYM; 1	SYM; 2	SYM; 3	PHI; 1	PHI; 2	PHI; 3	SMP; 1	SMP; 2	SMP; 3	QLD; 1	QLD; 2	QLD; 3	SAN; 1	SAN; 2	SAN; 3	SUR; 1; 7	SUR; 2; 5	SUR; 3 Ret				13th	16

=== Complete F4 British Championship results ===
(key) (Races in bold indicate pole position; races in italics indicate fastest lap)

Year	Team	1	2	3	4	5	6	7	8	9	10	11	12	13	14	15	16	17	18	19	20	21	22	23	24	25	26	27	28	29	30	DC	Points
2016	Double R Racing	BHI; 1; 9	BHI; 2; 4	BHI; 3; 8	DON; 1 Ret	DON; 2 Ret	DON; 3 Ret	THR; 1 Ret	THR; 2; 5	THR; 3; 6	OUL; 1; 8	OUL; 2 Ret	OUL; 3; 10	**CRO**; **1**; 1	CRO; 2; 2	**CRO**; **3**; 2	SNE; 1; 4	SNE; 2; 14	SNE; 3; 7	KNO; 1; 3	KNO; 2; 2	KNO; 3; 1	ROC; 1; 9	ROC; 2; 10	ROC; 3; 12	SIL; 1; 1	SIL; 2; 6	SIL; 3; 1	BHGP; 1; 13	BHGP; 2; 10	BHGP; 3; 6	8th	239

=== Complete Formula Renault Eurocup results ===
(key) (Races in bold indicate pole position; races in italics indicate fastest lap)

Year	Entrant	1	2	3	4	5	6	7	8	9	10	11	12	13	14	15	16	17	18	19	20	21	22	23	DC	Points
2017	Arden	MNZ; 1; 15	MNZ; 2; 20	SIL; 1; 13	SIL; 2; 13	PAU; 1; 19	PAU; 2; 15	MON; 1; 18	MON; 2; 17	HUN; 1; 9	HUN; 2; 15	HUN; 3; 17	NÜR; 1; 10	NÜR; 2; 11	RBR; 1; 29	RBR; 2; 16	LEC; 1; 10	LEC; 2; 28	SPA; 1; 24	SPA; 2; 18	SPA; 3; 13	CAT; 1; 15	CAT; 2 Ret	CAT; 3 DNS	20th	5

=== Complete Formula Renault NEC results ===
(key) (Races in bold indicate pole position) (Races in italics indicate fastest lap)

Year	Entrant	1	2	3	4	5	6	7	8	9	10	11	DC	Points
2017	Arden Motorsport	MNZ; 1	MNZ; 2	ASS; 1	ASS; 2	NÜR; 1	NÜR; 2	SPA; 1; 24	SPA; 2; 18	SPA; 3; 13	HOC; 1	HOC; 2	NC†	0

† As Goddard was a guest driver, he was ineligible for points

=== Super2 Series results ===
(key) (Races in bold indicate pole position; races in italics indicate fastest lap)

Year	Team	No.	Car	1	2	3	4	5	6	7	8	9	10	11	12	13	14	15	16	DC	Points
2018	Brad Jones Racing	8	Holden VF Commodore	ADE; R1; 16	ADE; R2; 14	ADE; R3; 17	SYM; R4; 14	SYM; R5; 22	SYM; R6; 14	BAR; R7; 15	BAR; R8; 19	BAR; R9; 14	TOW; R10; 11	TOW; R11; 9	SAN; R12; 15	SAN; R13; 16	BAT; R14; 15	NEW; R15; 6	NEW; R16; C	14th	835
2019	MW Motorsport	28	Nissan Altima L33	ADE; R1; 2	ADE; R2; 3	ADE; R3; 3	**BAR**; **R4**; 2	**BAR**; **R5**; 9	TOW; R6; 4	TOW; R7; 5	QLD; R8; 11	QLD; R9; 13	BAT; R10; 10	SAN; R11; 8	SAN; R12; 13	NEW; R13; 10	NEW; R14; 6			4th	1347

=== Supercars Championship results ===
Supercars results
Year	Team	No.	Car	1	2	3	4	5	6	7	8	9	10	11	12	13	14	15	16	17	18	19	20	21	22	23	24	25	26	27	28	29	30	31	32	33	34	DC	Points
2020	Matt Stone Racing	34	Holden ZB Commodore	ADE; R1; 18	ADE; R2; 16	MEL; R3; C	MEL; R4; C	MEL; R5; C	MEL; R6; C	SMP1; R7	SMP1; R8	SMP1; R9	SMP2; R10; 24	SMP2; R11; 24	SMP2; R12; 10	HID1; R13	HID1; R14	HID1; R15	HID2; R16; 21	HID2; R17; 21	HID2; R18; 21	TOW1; R19; Ret	TOW1; R20; 21	TOW1; R21; 19	TOW2; R22	TOW2; R23	TOW2; R24	BEN1; R25; 16	BEN1; R26; 24	BEN1; R27; 20	BEN2; R28	BEN2; R29	BEN2; R30	BAT; R31; Ret				25th	438
2021	Matt Stone Racing	35	Holden ZB Commodore	BAT1; R1; 12	BAT1; R2; 16	SAN; R3; 19	SAN; R4; 16	SAN; R5; 21	SYM; R6; 18	SYM; R7; 18	SYM; R8; 7	BEN; R9; 18	BEN; R10; 20	BEN; R11; 21	HID; R12; 16	HID; R13; 21	HID; R14; 23	TOW1; R15; 24	TOW1; R16; 18	TOW2; R17; 12	TOW2; R18; 22	TOW2; R19; 19	SMP1; R20; 24	SMP1; R21; 20	SMP1; R22; 22	SMP2; R23; 21	SMP2; R24; 22	SMP2; R25; 13	SMP3; R26; 8	SMP3; R27; 11	SMP3; R28; 17	SMP4; R29; 19	SMP4; R30; C	BAT2; R31; Ret				20th	1088
2022	Tickford Racing	5	Ford Mustang GT	SMP; R1	SMP; R2	SYM; R3	SYM; R4	SYM; R5	MEL; R6	MEL; R7	MEL; R8	MEL; R9	BAR; R10	BAR; R11	BAR; R12	WIN; R13	WIN; R14	WIN; R15	HID; R16	HID; R17	HID; R18	TOW; R19	TOW; R20	BEN; R21	BEN; R22	BEN; R23	SAN; R24; PO	SAN; R25; PO	SAN; R26; PO	PUK; R27	PUK; R28	PUK; R29	BAT; R30; Ret	SUR; R31	SUR; R32	ADE; R33	ADE; R34	NC	0
2023	Triple Eight Race Engineering	888	Chevrolet Camaro ZL1	NEW; R1	NEW; R2	MEL; R3	MEL; R4	MEL; R5	MEL; R6	BAR; R7	BAR; R8	BAR; R9	SYM; R10	SYM; R11	SYM; R12	HID; R13; 21	HID; R14; 22	HID; R15; 24	TOW; R16	TOW; R17	SMP; R18	SMP; R19	BEN; R20	BEN; R21	BEN; R22	SAN; R23; 10	BAT; R24; 24	SUR; R25	SUR; R26	ADE; R27	ADE; R28							37th	298

=== Complete Bathurst 1000 results ===
Year	Team	Car	Co-driver	Position	Laps
2020	Matt Stone Racing	Holden Commodore ZB	(Australia) Jake Kostecki	DNF	155
2021	Matt Stone Racing	Holden Commodore ZB	(Australia) Jayden Ojeda	DNF	112
2022	Tickford Racing	Ford Mustang Mk.6	(Australia) James Courtney	DNF	4
2023	Triple Eight Race Engineering	Chevrolet Camaro Mk.6	(Australia) Craig Lowndes	24th	141

=== Complete S5000 results ===
Year	Series	Team	1	2	3	4	5	6	7	8	9	10	11	12	13	14	15	16	17	18	Position	Points
2022	Australian	Team BRM	SYM; R1	SYM; R2	SYM; R3	PHI; R4	PHI; R5	PHI; R6	MEL; R7; 9	MEL; R8; 4	MEL; R9; 5	SMP; R10; 3	SMP; R11; Ret	SMP; R12; 8	HID; R13	HID; R14	HID; R15				9th	107
2023	Australian	Team BRM	SYM; R1; 8	SYM; R2; 10	SYM; R3; 8	PHI; R4	PHI; R5	PHI; R6	WIN; R7	WIN; R8	WIN; R9	SMP; R10	SMP; R11	SMP; R12	BEN; R13	BEN; R14	BEN; R15	ADL; R16	ADL; R17	ADL; R18	16th	44
