= Jake Kostecki =

Australian racing driver

- Nationality: Australian
- Born: 24 January 2000 (age 26) Perth, Western Australia
- Relatives: Kurt Kostecki (brother); Brodie Kostecki (cousin)

Supercars career
- Debut season: 2019
- Current team: Blanchard Racing Team
- Car number: 7
- Former teams: Tickford Racing
- Starts: 82
- Wins: 0
- Podiums: 0
- Poles: 0
- Best finish: 19th in 2021

Jake Kostecki (born 24 January 2000) is an Australian professional racing driver of Ukrainian descent. He formerly competed in the Supercars Championship.

== Biography ==
=== Junior Series ===
Kostecki began his career in karts at the age of eight, in the 2008 Western Australian Karting Championship. By 2011, Kostecki was winning races and in 2013, he came third in the SKUSA SuperNats XVII - TaG Junior sponsored by Russell Karting Specialties.

=== V8 Touring Car Series (2015) ===
Kostecki made headlines in 2015 with his announcement of joining the V8 Touring Car series, at the age of 15. Driving an ex-Craig Lowndes Ford Falcon, he finished ninth in the championship that year.

=== Super2 Series (2016–2019) ===
Kostecki made the move to the Super2 Series in 2016, where he finished 18th in the championship. His 2017 campaign suffered a major crash at the Sandown round.

=== Supercars Championship (2019–) ===
==== 2019 ====
Kostecki along with his cousin, Brodie Kostecki, teamed up in a PIRTEK Enduro Cup wildcard program in 2019 for Kostecki Brothers Racing, entering the Sandown 500, Bathurst 1000 and Gold Coast 600 races. Kostecki Brothers Racing converted a Super2 Series Holden VF Commodore to an updated current spec Holden ZB Commodore. The team qualified 24th at Sandown for Race 28 of the championship, and Jake finished the race in 22nd. For Race 29, his cousin Brodie started in Jake's finishing position of 22nd, and stormed his way to an eighth place finish in a challenging race with mixed weather conditions. For a small team punching above their weight, Kostecki Brothers Racing were praised for their efforts. Jake and Brodie finished 16th in the 161 lap main endurance race.

At the Supercheap Auto Bathurst 1000, Kostecki Brothers Racing qualified 23rd for the 1000 km race. Brodie nearly failed to make the start of the race driving to the grid, with a cool suit drama delay proceedings of the race. The team were not classified as finishers of the race, with a major crash taking them out of the proceedings. After the conclusion of the race, news reports stated that Kostecki Brothers Racing were in a race against time to get their car fixed for the next round at the Gold Coast 600 and ran the risk of not competing at the event.

The car was fixed and repaired in time for the Gold Coast 600. The team qualified 23rd for the first race of the weekend and finished in 18th. For the second race of the weekend, the team qualified 18th and finished in 16th position.

Overall, Kostecki Brothers Racing finished the 2019 PIRTEK Enduro Cup in 24th position with a total of 247 points, 631 points behind winners Jamie Whincup and Craig Lowndes of the Red Bull Holden Racing Team.

== Career results ==
=== Karting career summary ===
Season	Series	Position
2011	SKUSA SuperNationals XV - TaG Cadet	11th
2012	SKUSA SuperNationals XVI - TaG Junior	16th
2012	Australian National Sprint Kart Championship - Junior National Light	24th
2013	SKUSA SuperNats XVII - TaG Junior	**3rd**

=== Career summary ===
Season	Series	Position	Car	Team
2014	Western Australian Formula Ford Championship	17th	Van Diemen RF92	
2014	Australian Suzuki Swift Series	14th	Suzuki Swift	
2015	Australian V8 Touring Car Series	9th	Ford BF Falcon	Kostecki Brothers Racing
2016	Supercars Dunlop Series	18th	Holden VF Commodore	Kostecki Brothers Racing
2017	Dunlop Super2 Series	22nd	Holden VF Commodore	Kostecki Brothers Racing
2017	Stadium Super Trucks	32nd	Chevrolet LS V8 engine	Robby Gordon Motorsports
2018	Dunlop Super2 Series	18th	Holden VF Commodore	Kostecki Brothers Racing
2019	Dunlop Super2 Series	16th	Holden VF Commodore	Kostecki Brothers Racing
2019	Virgin Australia Supercars Championship	50th	Holden ZB Commodore	Kostecki Brothers Racing
2020	Virgin Australia Supercars Championship	27th	Holden ZB Commodore	Matt Stone Racing
2021	Repco Supercars Championship	19th	Holden ZB Commodore	Matt Stone Racing
2022	Repco Supercars Championship	22nd	Ford Mustang GT	Tickford Racing

=== Super3 Series results ===
(key) (Races in bold indicate pole position) (Races in italics indicate fastest lap)

Year	Team	No.	Car	1	2	3	4	5	6	7	8	9	10	11	12	13	14	15	Position	Points
2015	Kostecki Brothers Racing	56	Ford BF Falcon	SAN; R1; 14	SAN; R2; 7	SAN; R3; 8	WIN; R4; 4	WIN; R5; 4	WIN; R6; Ret	QLD; R7; 4	QLD; R8; 4	QLD; R9; Ret	PHI; R10; Ret	PHI; R11; 6	PHI; R12; 5	SMP; R13	SMP; R14	SMP; R15	9th	210

=== Super2 Series results ===
(key) (Races in bold indicate pole position) (Races in italics indicate fastest lap)

Year	Team	No.	Car	1	2	3	4	5	6	7	8	9	10	11	12	13	14	15	16	17	18	19	20	21	Position	Points
2016	Kostecki Brothers Racing	56	Holden VF Commodore	ADE; R1; Ret	ADE; R2; 18	PHI; R3; 20	PHI; R4; 19	PHI; R5; 24	BAR; R6; 18	BAR; R7; 15	BAR; R8; 21	TOW; R9; 12	TOW; R10; 13	SAN; R11; Ret	SAN; R12; 13	SAN; R13; 11	BAT; R14; 19	HOM; R15; 18	HOM; R16; 11						18th	683
2017	Kostecki Brothers Racing	56	Holden VF Commodore	ADE; R1; Ret	ADE; R2; 14	ADE; R3; 10	SYM; R4; 14	SYM; R5; Ret	SYM; R6; 16	SYM; R7; 9	PHI; R8; 12	PHI; R9; 9	PHI; R10; 11	PHI; R11; 23	TOW; R12; 13	TOW; R13; Ret	SYD; R14; 18	SYD; R15; 16	SYD; R16; 11	SYD; R17; 21	SAN; R18; 14	SAN; R19; Ret	NEW; R20	NEW; R21	22nd	564
2018	Kostecki Brothers Racing	56	Holden VF Commodore	ADE; R1; 9	ADE; R2; Ret	ADE; R3; 9	SYM; R4; Ret	SYM; R5; 13	SYM; R6; 17	BAR; R7; 10	BAR; R8; 9	BAR; R9; 8	TOW; R10; 10	TOW; R11; 14	SAN; R12; 6	SAN; R13; 6	BAT; R14; Ret	NEW; R15; 9	NEW; R16; Ret						18th	670
2019	Kostecki Brothers Racing	56	Holden VF Commodore	ADE; R1; 5	ADE; R2; 7	ADE; R3; 6	BAR; R4; 7	BAR; R5; 6	TOW; R6; Ret	**TOW**; **R7**; 7	QLD; R8; 4	QLD; R9; 6	BAT; R10	SAN; R11	SAN; R12	NEW; R13	NEW; R14								16th	722

=== Supercars Championship results ===
Supercars results
Year	Team	No.	Car	1	2	3	4	5	6	7	8	9	10	11	12	13	14	15	16	17	18	19	20	21	22	23	24	25	26	27	28	29	30	31	32	33	34	Position	Points
2019	Kostecki Brothers Racing	56	Holden ZB Commodore	ADE; R1	ADE; R2	MEL; R3	MEL; R4	MEL; R5	MEL; R6	SYM; R7	SYM; R8	PHI; R9	PHI; R10	BAR; R11	BAR; R12	WIN; R13	WIN; R14	HID; R15	HID; R16	TOW; R17	TOW; R18	QLD; R19	QLD; R20	BEN; R21	BEN; R22	PUK; R23	PUK; R24	BAT; R25; Ret	SUR; R26; 18	SUR; R27; 16	SAN; QR; 21	SAN; R28; 16	NEW; R29	NEW; R30				50th	217
2020	Matt Stone Racing	34	Holden ZB Commodore	ADE; R1	ADE; R2	MEL; R3; C	MEL; R4; C	MEL; R5; C	MEL; R6; C	SMP1; R7; 22	SMP1; R8; 24	SMP1; R9; 22	SMP2; R10	SMP2; R11	SMP2; R12	HID1; R13; Ret	HID1; R14; 22	HID1; R15; 14	HID1; R16	HID1; R17	HID1; R18	TOW1; R19	TOW1; R20	TOW1; R21	TOW2; R22; 20	TOW2; R23; 23	TOW2; R24; 22	BEN1; R25	BEN1; R26	BEN1; R27	BEN2; R28; Ret	BEN2; R29; 16	BEN2; R30; 20	BAT; R31; Ret				27th	290
2021	Matt Stone Racing	34	Holden ZB Commodore	BAT1; R1; 13	BAT1; R2; 17	SAN; R3; 23	SAN; R4; 18	SAN; R5; 14	SYM; R6; 13	SYM; R7; 15	SYM; R8; 21	BEN; R9; 21	BEN; R10; 18	BEN; R11; 16	HID; R12; 5	HID; R13; 24	HID; R14; 25	TOW1; R15; 19	TOW1; R16; DSQ	TOW2; R17; 16	TOW2; R18; 13	TOW2; R19; 14	SMP1; R20; 23	SMP1; R21; 21	SMP1; R22; 17	SMP2; R23; 16	SMP2; R24; 21	SMP2; R25; Ret	SMP3; R26; 17	SMP3; R27; 22	SMP3; R28; 16	SMP4; R29; 18	SMP4; R30; C	BAT2; R31; 13				19th	1157
2022	Tickford Racing	56	Ford Mustang S550	SMP; R1; 19	SMP; R2; 24	SYM; R3; 14	SYM; R4; Ret	SYM; R5; 25	MEL; R6; 15	MEL; R7; 13	MEL; R8; 20	MEL; R9; 13	BAR; R10; 20	BAR; R11; 9	BAR; R12; 23	WIN; R13; 24	WIN; R14; 20	WIN; R15; 25	HID; R16; 11	HID; R17; 11	HID; R18; 8	TOW; R19; 14	TOW; R20; 24	BEN; R21; 27	BEN; R22; 18	BEN; R23; Ret	SAN; R24; 22	SAN; R25; 20	SAN; R26; 20	PUK; R27; 21	PUK; R28; 9	PUK; R29; 15	BAT; R30; 17	SUR; R31; 23	SUR; R32; 16	ADE; R33; 15	ADE; R34; Ret	22nd	1192
2023	Blanchard Racing Team	7	Ford Mustang S650	NEW; R1	NEW; R2	MEL; R3	MEL; R4	MEL; R5	MEL; R6	BAR; R7	BAR; R8	BAR; R9	SYM; R10	SYM; R11	SYM; R12	HID; R13	HID; R14	HID; R15	TOW; R16	TOW; R17	SMP; R18	SMP; R19	BEN; R20	BEN; R21	BEN; R22	SAN; R23; 24	BAT; R24; 19	SUR; R25	SUR; R26	ADE; R27	ADE; R28							50th	162

=== Complete Bathurst 1000 results ===
Year	Team	Car	Co-driver	Position	Laps
2019	Kostecki Brothers Racing	Holden Commodore ZB	(Australia) Brodie Kostecki	DNF	111
2020	Matt Stone Racing	Holden Commodore ZB	(Australia) Zane Goddard	DNF	155
2021	Matt Stone Racing	Holden Commodore ZB	(Australia) Kurt Kostecki	13th	161
2022	Tickford Racing	Ford Mustang S550	(Australia) Kurt Kostecki	17th	161
2023	Blanchard Racing Team	Ford Mustang S650	(Australia) Aaron Love	19th	160

=== Stadium Super Trucks ===
(key) (Bold – Pole position. Italics – Fastest qualifier. * – Most laps led.)

Stadium Super Trucks results
Year	1	2	3	4	5	6	7	8	9	10	11	12	13	14	15	16	17	18	19	20	21	22	SSTC	Pts	Ref
2017	ADE	ADE	ADE	STP	STP	LBH	LBH	PER; 12	PER; DNS	PER; DNS	DET	DET	TEX	TEX	HID	HID	HID	BEI	GLN	GLN	ELS	ELS	32nd	9	
