= 2021 Sydney SuperNight =

Motor racing event

(New South Wales) Sydney SuperNight
Event Information
- Round 8 of 12 in the 2021 Supercars Championship
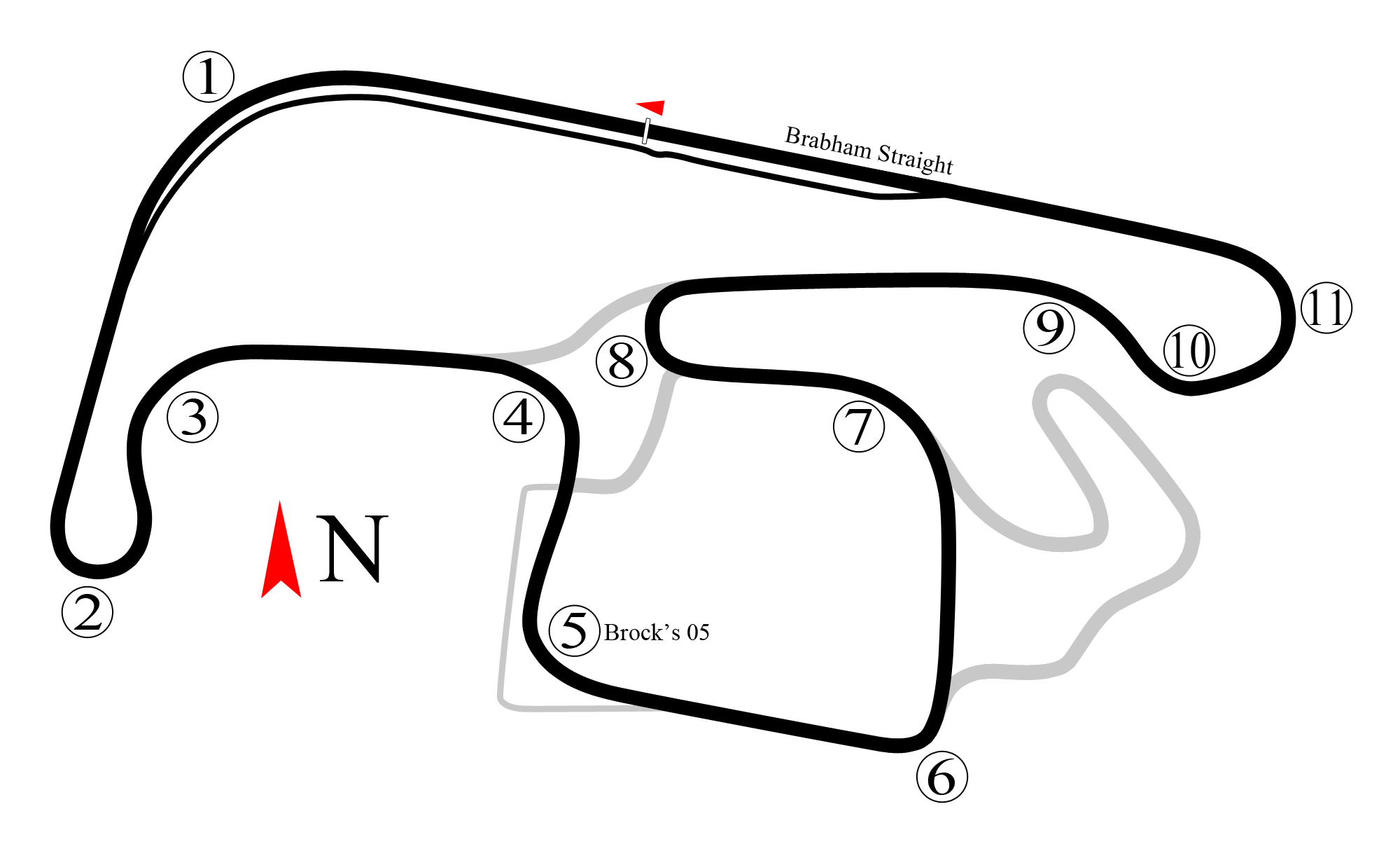
- Date: 29-31 October 2021 Supercars Championship
- Location: Eastern Creek, New South Wales
- Venue: Sydney Motorsport Park

Results
Race 1
Distance	32 laps	km
Pole position	(Australia) Anton de Pasquale; Dick Johnson Racing	
Winner	(Australia) Anton de Pasquale; Dick Johnson Racing	
Race 2
Distance	32 laps	km
Pole position	(Australia) Anton de Pasquale; Dick Johnson Racing	
Winner	(New Zealand) Shane van Gisbergen; Triple Eight Race Engineering	
Race 3
Distance	32 laps	km
Pole position	(Australia) Anton de Pasquale; Dick Johnson Racing	
Winner	(Australia) Anton de Pasquale; Dick Johnson Racing	
Round Results
First	(New Zealand) Shane van Gisbergen; Triple Eight Race Engineering	272 pts
Second	(Australia) Will Davison; Dick Johnson Racing	230 pts
Third	(Australia) Will Brown; Erebus Motorsport	219 pts

The 2021 Sydney SuperNight (known for sponsorship reasons as the 2021 Bunnings Trade Sydney SuperNight) is a motor racing event held on the weekend of 29-31 October 2021 at Sydney Motorsport Park in Eastern Creek, New South Wales.

== Entry list ==
No.	Driver Name	Team (Sponsor)	Car	No.	Driver Name	Team (Sponsor)	Car
2	(Australia) Bryce Fullwood	Walkinshaw Andretti United (Mobil 1, Middy's Electrical)	Holden Commodore ZB	19	(New Zealand) Fabian Coulthard	Team Sydney (Local Legends)	Holden Commodore ZB
3	(Australia) Tim Slade	Blanchard Racing Team (Dayco, Cooldrive Auto Parts)	Ford Mustang GT	20	(Australia) Scott Pye	Team 18 (DeWalt Tools, BP)	Holden Commodore ZB
4	(Australia) Jack Smith	Brad Jones Racing (SCT Logistics)	Holden Commodore ZB	22	(Australia) Garry Jacobson	Team Sydney (PremiAir Hire, Muscle Car Warehouse)	Holden Commodore ZB
5	(Australia) Jack Le Brocq	Tickford Racing (Truck Assist)	Ford Mustang GT	25	(Australia) Chaz Mostert	Walkinshaw Andretti United (Mobil 1, Appliances Online)	Holden Commodore ZB
6	(Australia) Cam Waters	Tickford Racing (Monster Energy)	Ford Mustang GT	26	(Australia) David Reynolds	Kelly Grove Racing (Penrite)	Ford Mustang GT
7	(New Zealand) Andre Heimgartner	Kelly Grove Racing (Ned Whiskey, Penrite)	Ford Mustang GT	34	(Australia) Jake Kostecki	Matt Stone Racing (Unit Clothing)	Holden Commodore ZB
8	(Australia) Nick Percat	Brad Jones Racing (R&J Batteries, Coca-Cola)	Holden Commodore ZB	35	(Australia) Zane Goddard	Matt Stone Racing (Yellow Cover)	Holden Commodore ZB
9	(Australia) Will Brown	Erebus Motorsport (WD-40)	Holden Commodore ZB	44	(Australia) James Courtney	Tickford Racing (Boost Mobile)	Ford Mustang GT
11	(Australia) Anton de Pasquale	Dick Johnson Racing (Shell V-Power)	Ford Mustang GT	88	(Australia) Jamie Whincup	Triple Eight Race Engineering (Red Bull, Ampol)	Holden Commodore ZB
14	(Australia) Todd Hazelwood	Brad Jones Racing (Dunlop Super Dealer)	Holden Commodore ZB	96	(Australia) Macauley Jones	Brad Jones Racing (Coca-Cola)	Holden Commodore ZB
17	(Australia) Will Davison	Dick Johnson Racing (Shell V-Power)	Ford Mustang GT	97	(New Zealand) Shane van Gisbergen	Triple Eight Race Engineering (Red Bull, Ampol)	Holden Commodore ZB
18	(Australia) Mark Winterbottom	Team 18 (Irwin Tools, Bunnings)	Holden Commodore ZB	99	(Australia) Brodie Kostecki	Erebus Motorsport (Boost Mobile)	Holden Commodore ZB

== Results ==
=== Practice ===
Session	Fastest Lap				
Session	No.	Driver	Team	Car	Ref
1	11	(Australia) Anton de Pasquale	Dick Johnson Racing	Ford Mustang GT	
2	11	(Australia) Anton de Pasquale	Dick Johnson Racing	Ford Mustang GT	

=== Qualifying ===
==== Q1 ====
Pos.	No.	Driver Name	Team	Car	Time	Gap	Grid
1	11	(Australia) Anton de Pasquale	Dick Johnson Racing	Ford Mustang GT	01:28.5588		Top 10
2	17	(Australia) Will Davison	Dick Johnson Racing	Ford Mustang GT	01:28.7016	+0.1427 s	Top 10
3	97	(New Zealand) Shane van Gisbergen	Triple Eight Race Engineering	Holden Commodore ZB	01:28.8570	+0.2981 s	Top 10
4	8	(Australia) Nick Percat	Brad Jones Racing	Holden Commodore ZB	01:29.0211	+0.4622 s	Top 10
5	9	(Australia) Will Brown	Erebus Motorsport	Holden Commodore ZB	01:29.0405	+0.4817 s	Top 10
6	6	(Australia) Cam Waters	Tickford Racing	Ford Mustang GT	01:29.3336	+0.7748 s	Top 10
7	99	(Australia) Brodie Kostecki	Erebus Motorsport	Holden Commodore ZB	01:29.4126	+0.8357 s	Top 10
8	88	(Australia) Jamie Whincup	Triple Eight Race Engineering	Holden Commodore ZB	01:29.4150	+0.8561 s	Top 10
9	25	(Australia) Chaz Mostert	Walkinshaw Andretti United	Holden Commodore ZB	01:29.4865	+0.9276 s	Top 10
10	3	(Australia) Tim Slade	Blanchard Racing Team	Ford Mustang GT	01:29.4871	+0.9282 s	Top 10
11	26	(Australia) David Reynolds	Kelly Grove Racing	Ford Mustang GT	01:29.5674	+1.0085 s	11
12	7	(New Zealand) Andre Heimgartner	Kelly Grove Racing	Ford Mustang GT	01:29.5825	+1.0236 s	12
13	14	(Australia) Todd Hazelwood	Brad Jones Racing	Holden Commodore ZB	01:29.6401	+1.0813 s	13
14	19	(New Zealand) Fabian Coulthard	Team Sydney	Holden Commodore ZB	01:29.6793	+1.1204 s	14
15	5	(Australia) Jack Le Brocq	Tickford Racing	Ford Mustang GT	01:29.7218	+1.1629 s	15
16	18	(Australia) Mark Winterbottom	Team 18	Holden Commodore ZB	01:29.8353	+1.2764 s	16
17	2	(Australia) Bryce Fullwood	Walkinshaw Andretti United	Holden Commodore ZB	01:29.8687	+1.3098 s	17
18	20	(Australia) Scott Pye	Team 18	Holden Commodore ZB	01:29.8994	+1.3405 s	18
19	4	(Australia) Jack Smith	Brad Jones Racing	Holden Commodore ZB	01:29.9745	+1.4156 s	19
20	96	(Australia) Macauley Jones	Brad Jones Racing	Holden Commodore ZB	01:30.0392	+1.4804 s	20
21	22	(Australia) Garry Jacobson	Team Sydney	Holden Commodore ZB	01:30.1583	+1.5994 s	21
22	34	(Australia) Jake Kostecki	Matt Stone Racing	Holden Commodore ZB	01:30.1797	+1.6208 s	22
23	44	(Australia) James Courtney	Tickford Racing	Ford Mustang GT	01:30.3663	+1.8074 s	23
24	35	(Australia) Zane Goddard	Matt Stone Racing	Holden Commodore ZB	01:30.4535	+1.8946 s	24

==== Top 10 ====
Pos.	No.	Driver Name	Team	Car	Time	Gap
1	11	(Australia) Anton de Pasquale	Dick Johnson Racing	Ford Mustang GT	01:28.0772	
2	9	(Australia) Will Brown	Erebus Motorsport	Holden Commodore ZB	01:28.6055	+0.5283 s
3	17	(Australia) Will Davison	Dick Johnson Racing	Ford Mustang GT	01:28.6187	+0.5415 s
4	8	(Australia) Nick Percat	Brad Jones Racing	Holden Commodore ZB	01:28.6902	+0.6131 s
5	99	(Australia) Brodie Kostecki	Erebus Motorsport	Holden Commodore ZB	01:28.7028	+0.6256 s
6	97	(New Zealand) Shane van Gisbergen	Triple Eight Race Engineering	Holden Commodore ZB	01:28.7295	+0.6523 s
7	6	(Australia) Cam Waters	Tickford Racing	Ford Mustang GT	01:28.8113	+0.7341 s
8	88	(Australia) Jamie Whincup	Triple Eight Race Engineering	Holden Commodore ZB	01:29.1821	+1.1049 s
9	25	(Australia) Chaz Mostert	Walkinshaw Andretti United	Holden Commodore ZB	01:29.1942	+1.1170 s
10	3	(Australia) Tim Slade	Blanchard Racing Team	Ford Mustang GT	01:29.6085	+1.5313 s

== Races ==
=== Race 1 ===
Pos.	No.	Driver Name	Team	Car	Laps	Gap/Retired	Points	Grid
1	11	(Australia) Anton de Pasquale	Dick Johnson Racing	Ford Mustang GT	32		100	1
2	97	(New Zealand) Shane van Gisbergen	Triple Eight Race Engineering	Holden Commodore ZB	32	+5.159 s	92	6
3	99	(Australia) Brodie Kostecki	Erebus Motorsport	Holden Commodore ZB	32	+10.389 s	86	5
4	8	(Australia) Nick Percat	Brad Jones Racing	Holden Commodore ZB	32	+10.963 s	80	4
5	9	(Australia) Will Brown	Erebus Motorsport	Holden Commodore ZB	32	+11.676 s	74	2
6	25	(Australia) Chaz Mostert	Walkinshaw Andretti United	Holden Commodore ZB	32	+16.936 s	68	9
7	17	(Australia) Will Davison	Dick Johnson Racing	Ford Mustang GT	32	+18.520 s	64	3
8	26	(Australia) David Reynolds	Kelly Grove Racing	Ford Mustang GT	32	+22.593 s	60	11
9	88	(Australia) Jamie Whincup	Triple Eight Race Engineering	Holden Commodore ZB	32	+22.811 s	56	8
10	3	(Australia) Tim Slade	Blanchard Racing Team	Ford Mustang GT	32	+27.515 s	52	10
11	19	(New Zealand) Fabian Coulthard	Team Sydney	Holden Commodore ZB	32	+36.614 s	48	14
12	18	(Australia) Mark Winterbottom	Team 18	Holden Commodore ZB	32	+37.136 s	46	16
13	6	(Australia) Cam Waters	Tickford Racing	Ford Mustang GT	32	+37.958 s	44	7
14	14	(Australia) Todd Hazelwood	Brad Jones Racing	Holden Commodore ZB	32	+38.592 s	42	13
15	7	(New Zealand) Andre Heimgartner	Kelly Grove Racing	Ford Mustang GT	32	+38.798 s	40	12
16	96	(Australia) Macauley Jones	Brad Jones Racing	Holden Commodore ZB	32	+41.789 s	38	20
17	22	(Australia) Garry Jacobson	Team Sydney	Holden Commodore ZB	32	+43.892 s	36	21
18	2	(Australia) Bryce Fullwood	Walkinshaw Andretti United	Holden Commodore ZB	32	+45.061 s	34	17
19	20	(Australia) Scott Pye	Team 18	Holden Commodore ZB	32	+45.233 s	32	18
20	4	(Australia) Jack Smith	Brad Jones Racing	Holden Commodore ZB	32	+45.382 s	30	19
21	5	(Australia) Jack Le Brocq	Tickford Racing	Ford Mustang GT	32	+45.572 s	28	15
22	44	(Australia) James Courtney	Tickford Racing	Ford Mustang GT	32	+53.908 s	26	23
23	34	(Australia) Jake Kostecki	Matt Stone Racing	Holden Commodore ZB	32	+56.952 s	24	22
24	35	(Australia) Zane Goddard	Matt Stone Racing	Holden Commodore ZB	32	+1:00.728 s	22	24

=== Race 2 ===
Pos.	No.	Driver Name	Team	Car	Laps	Gap/Retired	Points	Grid
1	97	(New Zealand) Shane van Gisbergen	Triple Eight Race Engineering	Holden Commodore ZB	32		100	6
2	17	(Australia) Will Davison	Dick Johnson Racing	Ford Mustang GT	32	+1.910 s	92	2
3	8	(Australia) Nick Percat	Brad Jones Racing	Holden Commodore ZB	32	+9.440 s	86	5
4	99	(Australia) Brodie Kostecki	Erebus Motorsport	Holden Commodore ZB	32	+10.786 s	80	3
5	3	(Australia) Tim Slade	Blanchard Racing Team	Ford Mustang GT	32	+16.860 s	74	10
6	88	(Australia) Jamie Whincup	Triple Eight Race Engineering	Holden Commodore ZB	32	+16.992 s	68	4
7	25	(Australia) Chaz Mostert	Walkinshaw Andretti United	Holden Commodore ZB	32	+17.547 s	64	8
8	7	(New Zealand) Andre Heimgartner	Kelly Grove Racing	Ford Mustang GT	32	+17.982 s	60	7
9	26	(Australia) David Reynolds	Kelly Grove Racing	Ford Mustang GT	32	+18.394 s	56	13
10	14	(Australia) Todd Hazelwood	Brad Jones Racing	Holden Commodore ZB	32	+25.682 s	52	11
11	9	(Australia) Will Brown	Erebus Motorsport	Holden Commodore ZB	32	+31.601 s	48	9
12	2	(Australia) Bryce Fullwood	Walkinshaw Andretti United	Holden Commodore ZB	32	+34.330 s	46	15
13	6	(Australia) Cam Waters	Tickford Racing	Ford Mustang GT	32	+41.197 s	44	14
14	5	(Australia) Jack Le Brocq	Tickford Racing	Ford Mustang GT	32	+44.851 s	42	12
15	20	(Australia) Scott Pye	Team 18	Holden Commodore ZB	32	+48.531 s	40	17
16	96	(Australia) Macauley Jones	Brad Jones Racing	Holden Commodore ZB	32	+49.396 s	38	18
17	18	(Australia) Mark Winterbottom	Team 18	Holden Commodore ZB	32	+r50.279 s	36	16
18	44	(Australia) James Courtney	Tickford Racing	Ford Mustang GT	32	+50.944 s	34	20
19	4	(Australia) Jack Smith	Brad Jones Racing	Holden Commodore ZB	32	+53.620 s	32	21
20	35	(Australia) Zane Goddard	Matt Stone Racing	Holden Commodore ZB	32	+1:13.304 s	30	23
21	34	(Australia) Jake Kostecki	Matt Stone Racing	Holden Commodore ZB	32	+1:15.941 s	28	22
22	22	(Australia) Garry Jacobson	Team Sydney	Holden Commodore ZB	32	+1:27.124 s	26	24
23	19	(New Zealand) Fabian Coulthard	Team Sydney	Holden Commodore ZB	31	+1 lap	24	19
DSQ	11	(Australia) Anton de Pasquale	Dick Johnson Racing	Ford Mustang GT	0		0 (Note: Anton de Pasquale finished 5th but was excluded from the race due to him using one of his teammates allocated tires.)	1

=== Race 3 ===
Pos.	No.	Driver Name	Team	Car	Laps	Gap/Retired	Points	Grid
1	11	(Australia) Anton de Pasquale	Dick Johnson Racing	Ford Mustang GT	32		100	1
2	9	(Australia) Will Brown	Erebus Motorsport	Holden Commodore ZB	32	+1.262 s	92	2
3	88	(Australia) Jamie Whincup	Triple Eight Race Engineering	Holden Commodore ZB	32	+20.575 s	86	3
4	97	(New Zealand) Shane van Gisbergen	Triple Eight Race Engineering	Holden Commodore ZB	32	+28.166 s	80	4
5	17	(Australia) Will Davison	Dick Johnson Racing	Ford Mustang GT	32	+33.234 s	74	6
6	6	(Australia) Cam Waters	Tickford Racing	Ford Mustang GT	32	+34.543 s	68	12
7	25	(Australia) Chaz Mostert	Walkinshaw Andretti United	Holden Commodore ZB	32	+37.739 s	64	10
8	5	(Australia) Jack Le Brocq	Tickford Racing	Ford Mustang GT	32	+39.461 s	60	13
9	3	(Australia) Tim Slade	Blanchard Racing Team	Ford Mustang GT	32	+41.636 s	56	11
10	18	(Australia) Mark Winterbottom	Team 18	Holden Commodore ZB	32	+44.136 s	52	7
11	8	(Australia) Nick Percat	Brad Jones Racing	Holden Commodore ZB	32	+46.422 s	48	9
12	44	(Australia) James Courtney	Tickford Racing	Ford Mustang GT	32	+46.435 s	46	17
13	7	(New Zealand) Andre Heimgartner	Kelly Grove Racing	Ford Mustang GT	32	+51.392 s	44	14
14	26	(Australia) David Reynolds	Kelly Grove Racing	Ford Mustang GT	32	+55.242 s	42	15
15	99	(Australia) Brodie Kostecki	Erebus Motorsport	Holden Commodore ZB	32	+55.440 s	40	5
16	96	(Australia) Macauley Jones	Brad Jones Racing	Holden Commodore ZB	32	+56.739 s	38	19
17	34	(Australia) Jake Kostecki	Matt Stone Racing	Holden Commodore ZB	32	+58.591 s	36	23
18	2	(Australia) Bryce Fullwood	Walkinshaw Andretti United	Holden Commodore ZB	32	+1:04.493 s	34	16
19	4	(Australia) Jack Smith	Brad Jones Racing	Holden Commodore ZB	32	+1:10.825 s	32	18
20	20	(Australia) Scott Pye	Team 18	Holden Commodore ZB	32	+1:11.160 s	30	21
21	22	(Australia) Garry Jacobson	Team Sydney	Holden Commodore ZB	32	+1:11.932 s	28	20
22	35	(Australia) Zane Goddard	Matt Stone Racing	Holden Commodore ZB	32	+1:18.317	26	22
23	14	(Australia) Todd Hazelwood	Brad Jones Racing	Holden Commodore ZB	29	+3 Lap	24	8
NC	19	(New Zealand) Fabian Coulthard	Team Sydney	Holden Commodore ZB	17	Drive Shaft	0	24
