= Grove Racing =

Australian motor racing team

- Manufacturer: Ford; Mercedes-AMG
- Owner: Stephen Grove; Brenton Grove
- Race Drivers: Supercars: 19. Matthew Payne; 26. Kai Allen; GTWC Australia: 4. Stephen Grove; Brenton Grove
- Race Engineers: 19. Jack Bell; 26. Alistair McVean
- Chassis: Mustang GT; AMG GT3 Evo
- Debut: 2011 (Carrera Cup); 2022 (Supercars)
- Drivers' Championships: 0
- Round wins: 6
- position: 2

Grove Racing is an Australian motor racing team that's previously competed in various series, including the Porsche Carrera Cup Australia Championship and Super2 Series. The team made its debut in the Supercars Championship in 2022. They will campaign two Ford Mustang S650s, driven by Matthew Payne and Kai Allen.

== History ==
=== GT racing ===
Grove Racing was founded by businessman Stephen Grove in 2011 with a focus on racing Porsches in various categories. Having first competed in the Porsche Sprint Challenge Australia, the team entered the Porsche Carrera Cup Australia Championship in 2012 with Stephen as driver in the elite class. In 2014, the team won the first of its five Bathurst 12 Hour class victories.

=== Super2 Series ===
In 2018, Stephen's son Brenton entered the Super2 Series having also competed in Porsches. The team drafted two-time 24 Hours of Le Mans winner Earl Bamber to co-drive with Brenton at that year's Bathurst 250 endurance race for the series. The team did not continue in the series in 2019 with Brenton moving to drive for Triple Eight Race Engineering in the series.

In 2021, Matthew Payne entered the Super2 Series for the last two rounds in a Nissan Altima L33.

=== Supercars Championship ===
In January 2021, Grove Group purchased 50% of Kelly Racing, which was rebranded Kelly Grove Racing. Six months later, Grove bought out the remainder of the team, to be known as Grove Racing from 2022.

In January 2021, Grove Group purchased 50% of Kelly Racing, which was rebranded Kelly Grove Racing. Six months later, Grove acquired the remaining shareholding, with the team competing as Grove Racing from the 2022 season onwards.

Ahead of the 2022 season, the team announced that former Supercars champion Garth Tander would join Grove Racing. Tander officially commenced his role in 2023, working as a driver advisor across both the Supercars program and the Grove Junior Team, while also becoming the team’s endurance co-driver.

For the 2022 Supercars Championship, Grove Racing fielded David Reynolds and Lee Holdsworth. Reynolds remained with the team through 2023, partnering rookie Matt Payne, who graduated from the Grove Junior Team.

Reynolds departed at the end of 2023 and was replaced by Richie Stanaway for the 2024 season. Stanaway completed a single season with the team before leaving at the end of 2024, with 2023 Super2 Series champion Kai Allen signed as his replacement for 2025.

The 2025 season marked Grove Racing’s most successful Supercars campaign to date. Payne and Allen achieved multiple podium finishes and delivered the team its first Bathurst 1000 victory, with Payne becoming one of the youngest winners in the event’s history. The win represented Grove Racing’s maiden triumph in the Bathurst classic.

In 2025, the team announced a major technical restructure for the 2026 season, including the recruitment of former Ferrari Formula One engineer Riccardo Corte as Technical Director and the promotion of Alistair McVean to Head of Performance. The team also confirmed that 2025 would be the final full-time season for Team Principal David Cauchi, who had overseen the squad’s transition from Kelly Grove Racing and played a central role in its first race win and Bathurst 1000 victory.

== Supercars Results ==
=== Car No. 19 results ===
Year	Driver	No.	Make	1	2	3	4	5	6	7	8	9	10	11	12	13	14	15	16	17	18	19	20	21	22	23	24	25	26	27	28	29	30	31	32	33	34	Position	Pts
2022	Lee Holdsworth	10	Ford	SMP; R1; 21	SMP; R2; 16	SYM; R3; 9	SYM; R4; 9	SYM; R5; 14	MEL; R6; 22	MEL; R7; 3	MEL; R8; 13	MEL; R9; 10	BAR; R10; 11	BAR; R11; 21	BAR; R12; 12	WIN; R13; 5	WIN; R14; 4	WIN; R15; 6	HID; R16; 15	HID; R17; 12	HID; R18; 16	TOW; R19; 17	TOW; R20; 23	BEN; R21; 15	BEN; R22; 22	BEN; R23; 10	SAN; R24; 24	SAN; R25; 18	SAN; R26; 18	PUK; R27; 12	PUK; R28; 12	PUK; R29; 14	BAT; R30; 6	SUR; R31; 15	SUR; R32; Ret	ADE; R33; 10	ADE; R34; 9	13th	1734
2023	Matthew Payne	19	Ford	NEW; R1; 12	NEW; R2; 14	MEL; R3; 13	MEL; R4; 17	MEL; R5; 21	MEL; R6; 12	BAR; R7; 6	BAR; R8; 9	BAR; R9; 18	SYM; R10; 15	SYM; R11; 15	SYM; R12; 21	HID; R13; 19	HID; R14; 23	HID; R15; 25	TOW; R16; 15	TOW; R17; 18	SMP; R18; 24	SMP; R19; 23	BEN; R20; 7	BEN; R21; 6	BEN; R22; 18	SAN; R23; 6	BAT; R24; 11	SUR; R25; 9	SUR; R26; 4	ADE; R27; 23	ADE; R28; 1							14th	1673
2024	Matthew Payne	19	Ford	BAT1; R1; 10	BAT1; R2; 7	MEL; R3; 3	MEL; R4; 3	MEL; R5; Ret	MEL; R6; 14	TAU; R7; 13	TAU; R8; 4	BAR; R9; 8	BAR; R10; 9	HID; R11; 15	HID; R12; 20	TOW; R13; 4	TOW; R14; 1	SMP; R15; 2	SMP; R16; 4	BEN; R17; 17	BEN; R18; 21	SAN; R19; 4	BAT; R20; Ret	SUR; R21; 4	SUR; R22; 9	ADE; R23; 4	ADE; R24; 23											6th	2019
2025	Matthew Payne	19	Ford	SYD; R1; 4	SYD; R2; 5	SYD; R3; 6	MEL; R4; 9	MEL; R5; 11	MEL; R6; 10	MEL; R7; C	TAU; R8; 1	TAU; R9; 4	TAU; R10; 1	SYM; R11; 15	SYM; R12; 7	SYM; R13; 1	BAR; R14; 6	BAR; R15; 5	BAR; R16; 2	HID; R17; 3	HID; R18; 8	HID; R19; 3	TOW; R20; 4	TOW; R21; 3	TOW; R22; 5	QLD; R23; 12	QLD; R24; 6	QLD; R25; 4	BEN; R26; 3	BAT; R27; 1	SUR; R28; 10	SUR; R29; 4	SAN; R30; 6	SAN; R31; 22	ADE; R32; 6	ADE; R33; 6	ADE; R34; 1		

=== Car No. 26 results ===
Year	Driver	No.	Make	1	2	3	4	5	6	7	8	9	10	11	12	13	14	15	16	17	18	19	20	21	22	23	24	25	26	27	28	29	30	31	32	33	34	Position	Pts
2022	David Reynolds	26	Ford	SMP; R1; 24	SMP; R2; 9	SYM; R3; 21	SYM; R4; 3	SYM; R5; 4	MEL; R6; 2	MEL; R7; 2	MEL; R8; 3	MEL; R9; Ret	BAR; R10; 4	BAR; R11; 11	BAR; R12; 6	WIN; R13; 3	WIN; R14; 3	WIN; R15; 4	HID; R16; 25	HID; R17; 5	HID; R18; 12	TOW; R19; 18	TOW; R20; 11	BEN; R21; 8	BEN; R22; 8	BEN; R23; 22	SAN; R24; 12	SAN; R25; 4	SAN; R26; 9	PUK; R27; 9	PUK; R28; 7	PUK; R29; 8	BAT; R30; Ret	SUR; R31; 2	SUR; R32; 4	ADE; R33; 11	ADE; R34; 15	8th	2132
2023	David Reynolds	26	Ford	NEW; R1; 10	NEW; R1; 12	NEW; R2; 3	MEL; R3; 19	MEL; R4; 23	MEL; R5; 14	MEL; R6; 8	BAR; R7; 3	BAR; R8; 14	BAR; R9; 4	SYM; R10; 16	SYM; R11; 23	SYM; R12; 12	HID; R13; 20	HID; R14; 22	HID; R15; 12	TOW; R16; 21	TOW; R17; 17	SMP; R18; Ret	SMP; R19; 20	BEN; R20; 13	BEN; R21; 4	BEN; R22; 20	SAN; R23; Ret	BAT; R24; 5	SUR; R25; 3	SUR; R26; 1	ADE; R27; 2	ADE; R28; 3						9th	1806
2024	Richie Stanaway	26	Ford	BAT1; R1; 4	BAT1; R2; 11	MEL; R3; 12	MEL; R4; 13	MEL; R5; 7	MEL; R6; 8	TAU; R7; 6	TAU; R8; 10	BAR; R9; 24	BAR; R10; 12	HID; R11; 14	HID; R12; 10	TOW; R13; 14	TOW; R14; 14	SMP; R15; 16	SMP; R16; 21	BEN; R17; 16	BEN; R18; 17	SAN; R19; Ret	BAT; R20; 9	SUR; R21; 9	SUR; R22; 7	ADE; R23	ADE; R24											19th	1447
2024	Dale Wood	26	Ford	BAT1; R1	BAT1; R2	MEL; R3	MEL; R4	MEL; R5	MEL; R6	TAU; R7	TAU; R8	BAR; R9	BAR; R10	HID; R11	HID; R12	TOW; R13	TOW; R14	SMP; R15	SMP; R16	BEN; R17	BEN; R18	SAN; R19; Ret	BAT; R20; 9	SUR; R21	SUR; R22	ADE; R23; 22	ADE; R24											46th	207
2024	Kai Allen	26	Ford	BAT1; R1	BAT1; R2	MEL; R3	MEL; R4	MEL; R5	MEL; R6	TAU; R7	TAU; R8	BAR; R9	BAR; R10	HID; R11	HID; R12	TOW; R13	TOW; R14	SMP; R15	SMP; R16	BEN; R17	BEN; R18	SAN; R19	BAT; R20	SUR; R21	SUR; R22	ADE; R23	ADE; R24; 22											40th	243
2025	Kai Allen	26	Ford	SYD; R1; 19	SYD; R2; 23	SYD; R3; 13	MEL; R4; 20	MEL; R5; 12	MEL; R6; 12	MEL; R7; C	TAU; R8; 7	TAU; R9; 10	TAU; R10; 18	SYM; R11; 12	SYM; R12; 18	SYM; R13; 24	BAR; R14; 11	BAR; R15; 11	BAR; R16; 8	HID; R17; 11	HID; R18; 3	HID; R19; 2	TOW; R20; 15	TOW; R21; 19	TOW; R22; 10	QLD; R23; 2	QLD; R24; 20	QLD; R25; 3	BEN; R26; 15	BAT; R27; 8	SUR; R28; 3	SUR; R29; 6	SAN; R30; 7	SAN; R31; 6	ADE; R32; 5	ADE; R33; 5	ADE; R34; 4		

=== Bathurst 1000 Results ===
Year	No.	Car	Drivers	Position	Laps
2022	10	Ford Mustang GT	(Australia) Lee Holdsworth (New Zealand) Matthew Payne	6th	161
2022	26	Ford Mustang GT	(Australia) David Reynolds (Australia) Matt Campbell	DNF	4
2023	19	Ford Mustang GT	(New Zealand) Matthew Payne (France) Kevin Estre	11th	161
2023	26	Ford Mustang GT	(Australia) David Reynolds (Australia) Garth Tander	5th	161
2024	19	Ford Mustang GT	(New Zealand) Matthew Payne (Australia) Garth Tander	DNF	130
2024	26	Ford Mustang GT	(New Zealand) Richie Stanaway (Australia) Dale Wood	9th	161
2025	26	Ford Mustang GT	(Australia) Kai Allen (Australia) Dale Wood	8th	161
2025	100	Ford Mustang GT	(New Zealand) Matthew Payne (Australia) Garth Tander	1st	161

=== Teams Championship results ===
Year	Car	Pos	Points
2021	Mustang GT	8th	2818
2022	Mustang GT	5th	3866
2023	Mustang GT	7th	3479
2024	Mustang GT	4th	3544
2025	Mustang GT	2nd	4736

== Supercar drivers ==
- (Australia) David Reynolds (2022–2023)
- (Australia) Lee Holdsworth (2022)
- (Australia) Matt Campbell (2022)
- (New Zealand) Matthew Payne (2022–present)
- (Australia) Garth Tander (2023-2025)
- (France) Kévin Estre (2023)
- (New Zealand) Richie Stanaway (2024)
- (Australia) Dale Wood (2024–2025)
- (Australia) Kai Allen (2024–present)
- (Australia) Tim Slade (2026–present)
- (Australia) Will Davison (2026–present)

== Super2 drivers ==
- (Australia) Brenton Grove (2018)
- (New Zealand) Earl Bamber (2018)
- (New Zealand) Matthew Payne (2021–22)

== Stats ==
Year	Driver	Race Starts	Race wins	Podiums
2022	(Australia) Lee Holdsworth	34	0	1
2022–2023	(Australia) David Reynolds	62	1	13
2022–present	(New Zealand) Matt Payne	121	13	35
2022	(Australia) Matt Campbell	1	0	0
2023	(France) Kévin Estre	2	0	0
2023–2025	(Australia) Garth Tander	6	1	2
2024	(New Zealand) Richie Stanaway	22	0	0
2024–2025	(Australia) Dale Wood	5	0	0
2024–present	(Australia) Kai Allen	69	2	13
2026–present	(Australia) Will Davison	2	0	0
2026–present	(Australia) Tim Slade	2	0	1

== Super2 Results ==
=== Car No. 10 results ===
Year	Driver	No.	Make	1	2	3	4	5	6	7	8	9	10	11	12	13	14	15	16	17	18	19	20	21	22	23	24	25	26	27	28	29	30	Position	Pts
2018	Brenton Grove	10	Holden	ADE; R1; Ret	ADE; R2; 17	ADE; R3; 18	SYM; R4; 18	SYM; R5; 19	SYM; R6; 16	BAR; R7; 21	BAR; R8; 21	BAR; R9; 18	TOW; R10; Ret	TOW; R11; 21	SAN; R12; 13	SAN; R13; 21	BAT; R14; 10	NEW; R15; 20	NEW; R16; C															21st	615
2021	Matthew Payne	10	Nissan	BAT; R1	BAT; R2	TOW1; R3	TOW1; R4	TOW2; R5	TOW2; R6	SMP; R7; 16	SMP; R8; C	BAT; R9; 13	BAT; R10; 5																					17th	234
2022	Matthew Payne	10	Nissan	SMP; R1; 4	SMP; R2; 2	BAR; R3; 1	BAR; R4; 2	TOW; R5; 10	TOW; R6; Ret	SAN; R7; 19	SAN; R8; 1	BAT; R9; 3	BAT; R10; C	ADE; R11; 2	ADE; R12; 4																			3rd	1209

== GT3-Programme drivers ==
- (Australia) Stephen Grove (2019–present)
- (Australia) Brenton Grove (2019–present)
- (United Kingdom) Ben Barker (2019–2020)
- (Australia) Anton De Pasquale (2022–2023)
- (New Zealand) Matt Payne (2022-present)
- (New Zealand) Earl Bamber (2023)
- (France) Jules Gounon (2024-present)

=== Bathurst 12 Hours results ===
Year	Co-drivers	Car	Class	Laps	Ovr. pos.	Class pos.
2018	(Australia) Stephen Grove (Australia) Brenton Grove (United Kingdom) Ben Barker (New Zealand) Daniel Gaunt	Porsche 911 GT3 R	B	260	17th	1st
2019	(Australia) Stephen Grove (Australia) Brenton Grove (United Kingdom) Ben Barker	Porsche 911 GT3 R	B	299	16th	1st
2020	(Australia) Stephen Grove (Australia) Brenton Grove (United Kingdom) Ben Barker	Porsche 911 GT3 R	APA	312	10th	1st
2022	(Australia) Stephen Grove (Australia) Brenton Grove (United Kingdom) Ben Barker	Porsche 911 GT3 R	APA	197	DNF	DNF
2023	(Australia) Brenton Grove (Australia) Stephen Grove (Australia) Anton De Pasquale	Porsche 911 GT3 R	A	56	DNF	DNF
