= 2022 Tasmania SuperSprint =

Motor racing event

Event Information
- Round 2 of 12 in the 2022 Supercars Championship
- Layout of the Symmons Plains Raceway
- Date: 26–27 March 2022
- Location: Launceston, Tasmania
- Venue: Symmons Plains Raceway

Results
Race 1
Distance	44 laps	106.040 km
Pole position	(Australia) Cam Waters; Tickford Racing	50.5363
Winner	(New Zealand) Shane van Gisbergen; Triple Eight Race Engineering	38:54.6721
Race 2
Distance	44 laps	106.040 km
Pole position	(New Zealand) Shane van Gisbergen; Triple Eight Race Engineering	50.484
Winner	(New Zealand) Shane van Gisbergen; Triple Eight Race Engineering	58:56.1766
Race 3
Distance	44 laps	106.040 km
Pole position	(New Zealand) Will Davison; Dick Johnson Racing	50.5515
Winner	(New Zealand) Shane van Gisbergen; Triple Eight Race Engineering	39:08.3251
Round Results
First	(New Zealand) Shane van Gisbergen; Triple Eight Race Engineering	300 pts
Second	(Australia) Anton de Pasquale; Dick Johnson Racing	228 pts
Third	(Australia) Broc Feeney; Triple Eight Race Engineering	226 pts

The 2022 Tasmania SuperSprint (known for commercial purpose as the 2022 NED Whisky Tasmania Supersprint) was a motor racing event held as a part of the 2022 Supercars Championship from Saturday 26 March to Sunday 27 March 2022. The event was held at the Symmons Plains Raceway in Launceston, Tasmania. It was the second round of the 2022 Supercars Championship and consisted of three races of 106.040 kilometres each.

== Results ==
=== Race 1 ===
Pos	No.	Driver	Team	Laps	Time / Retired	Grid	Points
1	97	(New Zealand) Shane van Gisbergen	Triple Eight Race Engineering	44	38:54.6721	5	100
2	17	(Australia) Will Davison	Dick Johnson Racing	44	+2.8302	2	92
3	6	(Australia) Cam Waters	Tickford Racing	44	+6.2856	1	86
4	99	(Australia) Brodie Kostecki	Erebus Motorsport	44	+8.861	4	80
5	88	(Australia) Broc Feeney	Triple Eight Race Engineering	44	+11.6976	3	74
6	11	(Australia) Anton de Pasquale	Dick Johnson Racing	44	+13.7417	12	68
7	20	(Australia) Scott Pye	Team 18	44	+16.0783	8	64
8	8	(New Zealand) Andre Heimgartner	Brad Jones Racing	44	+16.1006	7	60
9	10	(Australia) Lee Holdsworth	Grove Racing	44	+19.054	9	56
10	35	(Australia) Todd Hazelwood	Matt Stone Racing	44	+19.3518	9	52
11	3	(Australia) Tim Slade	Blanchard Racing Team	44	+19.5632	11	48
12	5	(Australia) James Courtney	Tickford Racing	44	+22.0862	6	46
13	9	(Australia) Will Brown	Erebus Motorsport	44	+24.7344	13	44
14	56	(Australia) Jake Kostecki	Tickford Racing	44	+29.1734	14	42
15	14	(Australia) Bryce Fullwood	Brad Jones Racing	44	+35.0887	15	40
16	76	(Australia) Garry Jacobson	PremiAir Racing	44	+37.0669	16	38
17	4	(Australia) Jack Smith	Brad Jones Racing	44	+40.0255	17	36
18	18	(Australia) Mark Winterbottom	Team 18	44	+43.7835	11	34
19	96	(Australia) Macauley Jones	Brad Jones Racing	44	+47.1671	19	32
20	22	(New Zealand) Chris Pither	PremiAir Racing	44	+49.2228	20	30
21	26	(Australia) David Reynolds	Grove Racing	44	+50.7467	15	28
22	55	(Australia) Thomas Randle	Tickford Racing	43	+1 lap	14	26
23	25	(Australia) Chaz Mostert	Walkinshaw Andretti United	41	+3 laps	13	24
24	2	(Australia) Nick Percat	Walkinshaw Andretti United	38	+6 laps	24	22
Ret	34	(Australia) Jack Le Brocq	Matt Stone Racing	34	steering arm	10	0

=== Race 2 ===
Pos	No.	Driver	Team	Laps	Time / Retired	Grid	Points
1	97	(New Zealand) Shane van Gisbergen	Triple Eight Race Engineering	44	58:56.1766	1	100
2	88	(Australia) Broc Feeney	Triple Eight Race Engineering	44	+2.4175	2	92
3	26	(Australia) David Reynolds	Grove Racing	44	+3.7173	3	86
4	25	(Australia) Chaz Mostert	Walkinshaw Andretti United	44	+4.2382	4	80
5	11	(Australia) Anton de Pasquale	Dick Johnson Racing	44	+9.0123	8	74
6	18	(Australia) Mark Winterbottom	Team 18	44	+11.5154	3	68
7	20	(Australia) Scott Pye	Team 18	44	+14.5569	7	64
8	5	(Australia) James Courtney	Tickford Racing	44	+17.4306	8	60
9	10	(Australia) Lee Holdsworth	Grove Racing	44	+17.6979	9	56
10	35	(Australia) Todd Hazelwood	Matt Stone Racing	44	+19.3207	10	52
11	2	(Australia) Nick Percat	Walkinshaw Andretti United	44	+21.4818	9	48
12	9	(Australia) Will Brown	Erebus Motorsport	44	+23.7044	12	46
13	22	(New Zealand) Chris Pither	PremiAir Racing	44	+24.6656	13	44
14	3	(Australia) Tim Slade	Blanchard Racing Team	44	+26.7386	5	42
15	17	(Australia) Will Davison	Dick Johnson Racing	44	+26.9656	6	40
16	96	(Australia) Macauley Jones	Brad Jones Racing	44	+38.8959	21	38
17	6	(Australia) Cam Waters	Tickford Racing	44	+45.4844	12	36
18	14	(Australia) Bryce Fullwood	Brad Jones Racing	43	+1 lap	19	34
19	99	(Australia) Brodie Kostecki	Erebus Motorsport	43	+1 lap	23	32
20	4	(Australia) Jack Smith	Brad Jones Racing	37	+7 laps	22	30
Ret	55	(Australia) Thomas Randle	Tickford Racing	39	crash	25	0
Ret	8	(Australia) Andre Heimgartner	Brad Jones Racing	11	overheating	14	0
Ret	56	(Australia) Jake Kostecki	Tickford Racing	7	crash	15	0
Ret	34	(Australia) Jack Le Brocq	Matt Stone Racing	0	crash	13	0
DNS	76	(Australia) Garry Jacobson	PremiAir Racing	0	did not start	0	0

=== Race 3 ===
Pos	No.	Driver	Team	Laps	Time / Retired	Grid	Points
1	97	(New Zealand) Shane van Gisbergen	Triple Eight Race Engineering	44	39:08.3251	3	100
2	17	(Australia) Will Davison	Dick Johnson Racing	44	+1.1882	1	92
3	11	(Australia) Anton de Pasquale	Dick Johnson Racing	44	+2.7833	5	86
4	26	(Australia) David Reynolds	Grove Racing	44	+3.197	6	80
5	35	(Australia) Todd Hazelwood	Matt Stone Racing	44	+5.9936	4	74
6	6	(Australia) Cam Waters	Tickford Racing	44	+7.5416	8	68
7	18	(Australia) Mark Winterbottom	Team 18	44	+9.6794	10	64
8	88	(Australia) Broc Feeney	Triple Eight Race Engineering	44	+10.3647	7	60
9	5	(Australia) James Courtney	Tickford Racing	44	+11.6524	14	56
10	2	(Australia) Nick Percat	Walkinshaw Andretti United	44	+15.417	21	52
11	3	(Australia) Tim Slade	Blanchard Racing Team	44	+16.1814	13	48
12	55	(Australia) Thomas Randle	Tickford Racing	44	+18.0615	15	46
13	20	(Australia) Scott Pye	Team 18	44	+18.8305	12	44
14	10	(Australia) Lee Holdsworth	Grove Racing	44	+22.689	9	42
15	9	(Australia) Will Brown	Erebus Motorsport	44	+22.7746	23	40
16	22	(New Zealand) Chris Pither	PremiAir Racing	44	+25.2238	25	38
17	4	(Australia) Jack Smith	Brad Jones Racing	44	+27.9997	18	36
18	25	(Australia) Chaz Mostert	Walkinshaw Andretti United	44	+28.1151	20	34
19	96	(Australia) Macauley Jones	Brad Jones Racing	44	+29.8338	24	32
20	76	(Australia) Garry Jacobson	PremiAir Racing	44	+30.7721	22	30
21	14	(Australia) Bryce Fullwood	Brad Jones Racing	44	+38.6902	17	28
22	99	(Australia) Brodie Kostecki	Erebus Motorsport	44	+41.3328	16	26
23	34	(Australia) Jack Le Brocq	Matt Stone Racing	44	+42.881	2	24
24	8	(Australia) Andre Heimgartner	Brad Jones Racing	44	+44.193	19	22
25	56	(Australia) Jake Kostecki	Tickford Racing	41	+3 laps	11	20

== Championship standings after the race ==
Drivers' Championship standings

	Pos.	Driver	Points
	1	(New Zealand) Shane van Gisbergen	562
Unchanged	2	(Australia) Anton de Pasquale	495
	3	(Australia) Will Davison	440
	4	(Australia) Chaz Mostert	417
	5	(Australia) Brodie Kostecki	387

Teams Championship standings

Pos.	Constructor	Points
1	(Australia) Triple Eight Race Engineering	944
2	(Australia) Dick Johnson Racing	935
3	(Australia) Erebus Motorsport	703
4	(Australia) Walkinshaw Andretti United	677
5	(Australia) Tickford Racing	676

- Note: Only the top five positions are included for standings.
