= 2022 Sydney SuperNight =

Motor racing event

(New South Wales) 2022 Sydney SuperNight
Event Information
- Round 1 of 12 in the 2022 Supercars Championship
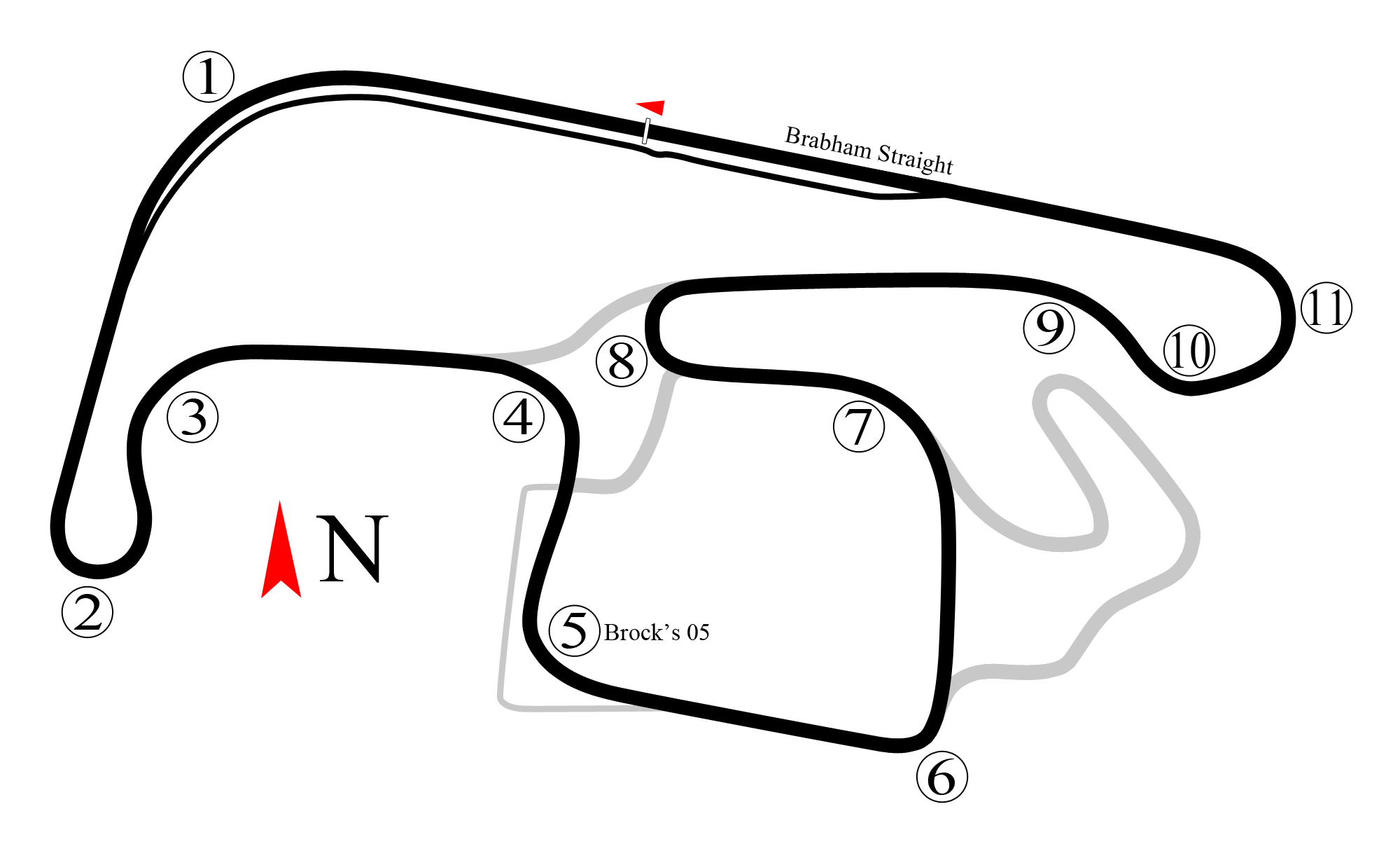
- Layout of the Sydney Motorsport Park
- Date: 5–6 March 2022
- Location: Eastern Creek, New South Wales
- Venue: Sydney Motorsport Park

Results
Race 1
Distance	77 laps	300 km
Pole position	(Australia) Anton de Pasquale; Dick Johnson Racing	01:29.3599
Winner	(New Zealand) Shane van Gisbergen; Triple Eight Race Engineering	02:03:01.4867
Race 2
Distance	77 laps	300 km
Pole position	(Australia) Brodie Kostecki; Erebus Motorsport	01:39.5216
Winner	(Australia) Chaz Mostert; Walkinshaw Andretti United	02:15:28.2867
Round Results
First	(Australia) Chaz Mostert; Walkinshaw Andretti United	276 pts
Second	(Australia) Anton de Pasquale; Dick Johnson Racing	264 pts
Third	(New Zealand) Shane van Gisbergen; Triple Eight Race Engineering	249 pts

The 2022 Sydney SuperNight (known for commercial purposes as the 2022 Beaurepaires Sydney SuperNight) was a motor racing event held as a part of the 2022 Supercars Championship from Saturday 5 March to Sunday 6 March 2022. The event was held at the Sydney Motorsport Park in Eastern Creek, New South Wales. It was the first round of the 2022 Supercars Championship and consisted of two races of 300 kilometres.

== Results ==
=== Race 1 ===
Pos	No.	Driver	Team	Laps	Time / Retired	Grid	Points
1	97	(New Zealand) Shane van Gisbergen	Triple Eight Race Engineering	77	02:03:01.4867	2	150
2	11	(Australia) Anton de Pasquale	Dick Johnson Racing	77	+19.558	1	138
3	25	(New Zealand) Chaz Mostert	Walkinshaw Andretti United	77	+31.053	8	129
4	17	(Australia) Will Davison	Dick Johnson Racing	77	+37.500	6	120
5	99	(Australia) Brodie Kostecki	Erebus Motorsport	77	+38.806	7	111
6	2	(Australia) Nick Percat	Walkinshaw Andretti United	77	+39.393	14	102
7	9	(Australia) Will Brown	Erebus Motorsport	77	+41.113	5	96
8	3	(Australia) Tim Slade	Blanchard Racing Team	77	+50.790	3	90
9	88	(Australia) Broc Feeney	Triple Eight Race Engineering	77	+52.477	10	84
10	5	(Australia) James Courtney	Tickford Racing	77	+54.523	15	78
11	6	(Australia) Cam Waters	Tickford Racing	77	+1:03.149	22	72
12	14	(Australia) Bryce Fullwood	Brad Jones Racing	77	+1:15.071	11	69
13	34	(Australia) Jack Le Brocq	Matt Stone Racing	77	+1:21.630	16	66
14	8	(New Zealand) Andre Heimgartner	Brad Jones Racing	77	+1:27.045	4	63
15	35	(Australia) Todd Hazelwood	Matt Stone Racing	77	+1:36.811	17	60
16	18	(Australia) Mark Winterbottom	Team 18	76	+1 lap	13	57
17	4	(Australia) Jack Smith	Brad Jones Racing	76	+1 lap	18	54
18	76	(Australia) Garry Jacobson	PremiAir Racing	76	+1 lap	20	51
19	56	(Australia) Jake Kostecki	Tickford Racing	76	+1 lap	25	48
20	55	(Australia) Thomas Randle	Tickford Racing	76	+1 lap	19	45
21	10	(Australia) Lee Holdsworth	Grove Racing	76	+1 lap	23	42
22	96	(Australia) Macauley Jones	Brad Jones Racing	76	+1 lap	21	39
23	22	(New Zealand) Chris Pither	PremiAir Racing	76	+1 lap	24	36
24	26	(Australia) David Reynolds	Grove Racing	64	+13 laps	9	33
Ret	20	(Australia) Scott Pye	Team 18	32	Power steering	12	0

=== Race 2 ===
Pos	No.	Driver	Team	Laps	Time / Retired	Grid	Points
1	25	(Australia) Chaz Mostert	Walkinshaw Andretti United	77	02:15:28.2867	7	150
2	99	(Australia) Brodie Kostecki	Erebus Motorsport	77	+2.766	1	138
3	11	(Australia) Anton de Pasquale	Dick Johnson Racing	77	+4.434	2	129
4	6	(Australia) Cam Waters	Tickford Racing	77	+4.974	3	120
5	8	(New Zealand) Andre Heimgartner	Brad Jones Racing	77	+6.847	12	111
6	97	(New Zealand) Shane van Gisbergen	Triple Eight Race Engineering	77	+7.873	21	102
7	17	(Australia) Will Davison	Dick Johnson Racing	77	+9.347	5	96
8	9	(Australia) Will Brown	Erebus Motorsport	77	+9.806	23	90
9	26	(New Zealand) David Reynolds	Grove Racing	77	+10.773	15	84
10	3	(Australia) Tim Slade	Blanchard Racing Team	77	+11.580	24	78
11	88	(Australia) Broc Feeney	Triple Eight Race Engineering	77	+11.960	4	72
12	18	(Australia) Mark Winterbottom	Team 18	77	+14.602	6	69
13	35	(Australia) Todd Hazelwood	Matt Stone Racing	77	+14.716	10	66
14	55	(Australia) Thomas Randle	Tickford Racing	77	+15.729	20	63
15	20	(Australia) Scott Pye	Team 18	77	+16.720	14	60
16	10	(Australia) Lee Holdsworth	Grove Racing	77	+17.287	11	57
17	5	(Australia) James Courtney	Tickford Racing	77	+17.988	8	54
18	4	(Australia) Jack Smith	Brad Jones Racing	76	+1 lap	22	51
19	14	(Australia) Bryce Fullwood	Brad Jones Racing	76	+1 lap	9	48
20	22	(New Zealand) Chris Pither	PremiAir Racing	77	+1 lap	13	45
21	96	(Australia) Macauley Jones	Brad Jones Racing	75	+2 laps	19	42
22	34	(Australia) Jack Le Brocq	Matt Stone Racing	74	+3 laps	17	39
23	2	(Australia) Nick Percat	Walkinshaw Andretti United	69	+8 laps	25	36
24	56	(Australia) Jake Kostecki	Tickford Racing	68	+9 laps	18	33
Ret	76	(Australia) Garry Jacobson	PremiAir Racing	29	Oil pressure	16	0

== Championship standings after the race ==
Drivers' Championship standings

	Pos.	Driver	Points
Unchanged	1	(Australia) Chaz Mostert	279
Unchanged	2	(Australia) Anton de Pasquale	267
Unchanged	3	(New Zealand) Shane van Gisbergen	252
Unchanged	4	(Australia) Brodie Kostecki	249
Unchanged	5	(Australia) Will Davison	216

Teams' Championship standings

	Pos.	Constructor	Points
Unchanged	1	(Australia) Dick Johnson Racing	483
Unchanged	2	(Australia) Erebus Motorsport	435
Unchanged	3	(Australia) Walkinshaw Andretti United	417
Unchanged	4	(Australia) Triple Eight Race Engineering	408
Unchanged	5	(Australia) Brad Jones Racing	291

- Note: Only the top five positions are included for both sets of standings.
