= 2022 Perth SuperNight =

Motor racing event

(Western Australia) 2022 Perth SuperNight
Event Information
- Round 4 of 12 in the 2022 Supercars Championship
- Layout of the Barbagallo Raceway
- Date: 30 April - 1 May 2022
- Location: Wanneroo, Western Australia
- Venue: Barbagallo Raceway

Results
Race 1
Distance	46 laps	110.906 km
Pole position	(Australia) Anton De Pasquale; Dick Johnson Racing	53.5982
Winner	(New Zealand) Shane van Gisbergen; Triple Eight Race Engineering	42:58.7301
Race 2
Distance	46 laps	110.906 km
Pole position	(Australia) Will Davison; Dick Johnson Racing	53.6293
Winner	(Australia) Will Davison; Dick Johnson Racing	01:41:34.0509
Race 3
Distance	46 laps	110.906 km
Pole position	(New Zealand) Shane van Gisbergen; Triple Eight Race Engineering	53.4632
Winner	(New Zealand) Shane van Gisbergen; Triple Eight Race Engineering	46:06.4142
Round Results
First	(New Zealand) Shane van Gisbergen; Triple Eight Race Engineering	284 pts
Second	(Australia) Anton De Pasquale; Dick Johnson Racing	264 pts
Third	(Australia) Will Davison; Dick Johnson Racing	259 pts

The 2022 Perth SuperNight (known for commercial purposes as the 2022 Bunnings Trade Perth SuperNight) was a motor racing event held as a part of the 2022 Supercars Championship from Saturday 30 April to Sunday 1 May 2022. The event was held at the Barbagallo Raceway in Wanneroo, Western Australia. It was the fourth round of the 2022 Supercars Championship and consisted of three races of 110.906 kilometres each.

== Results ==
=== Race 1 ===
Pos	No.	Driver	Team	Laps	Time / Retired	Grid	Points
1	97	(New Zealand) Shane van Gisbergen	Triple Eight Race Engineering	46	42:58.7301	3	105
2	11	(Australia) Anton De Pasquale	Dick Johnson Racing	46	+2.3077	1	92
3	6	(Australia) Cam Waters	Tickford Racing	46	+7.318	2	86
4	26	(Australia) David Reynolds	Grove Racing	46	+12.354	5	80
5	88	(Australia) Broc Feeney	Triple Eight Race Engineering	46	+14.0598	8	74
6	17	(Australia) Will Davison	Dick Johnson Racing	46	+15.9682	12	68
7	5	(Australia) James Courtney	Tickford Racing	46	+21.7293	6	64
8	99	(Australia) Brodie Kostecki	Erebus Motorsport	46	+22.5669	4	60
9	35	(Australia) Todd Hazelwood	Matt Stone Racing	46	+22.8757	11	56
10	8	(New Zealand) Andre Heimgartner	Brad Jones Racing	46	+26.3838	7	52
11	10	(Australia) Lee Holdsworth	Grove Racing	46	+29.7151	24	48
12	55	(Australia) Thomas Randle	Tickford Racing	46	+31.8874	9	46
13	3	(Australia) Tim Slade	Blanchard Racing Team	46	+32.1985	13	44
14	18	(Australia) Mark Winterbottom	Team 18	46	+32.6454	16	42
15	96	(Australia) Macauley Jones	Brad Jones Racing	46	+33.4729	19	40
16	34	(Australia) Jack Le Brocq	Matt Stone Racing	46	+35.186	14	38
17	9	(Australia) Will Brown	Erebus Motorsport	46	+36.3691	10	36
18	76	(Australia) Garry Jacobson	PremiAir Racing	46	+36.6698	17	34
19	20	(Australia) Scott Pye	Team 18	46	+37.102	15	32
20	56	(Australia) Jake Kostecki	Tickford Racing	46	+37.9697	18	30
21	2	(Australia) Nick Percat	Walkinshaw Andretti United	46	+40.7929	25	28
22	25	(Australia) Chaz Mostert	Walkinshaw Andretti United	46	+41.1888	23	26
23	4	(Australia) Jack Smith	Brad Jones Racing	46	+42.3983	21	24
24	22	(New Zealand) Chris Pither	PremiAir Racing	46	+44.0393	20	22
Ret	14	(Australia) Bryce Fullwood	Matt Stone Racing	32	transaxle	22	0

=== Race 2 ===
Pos	No.	Driver	Team	Laps	Time / Retired	Grid	Points
1	17	(Australia) Will Davison	Dick Johnson Racing	46	01:41:34.0509	1	100
2	11	(Australia) Anton De Pasquale	Dick Johnson Racing	46	+2.0984	5	92
3	8	(New Zealand) Andre Heimgartner	Brad Jones Racing	46	+2.5291	10	86
4	6	(Australia) Cam Waters	Tickford Racing	46	+3.5909	2	80
5	97	(New Zealand) Shane van Gisbergen	Triple Eight Race Engineering	46	+4.2602	11	74
6	99	(Australia) Brodie Kostecki	Erebus Motorsport	46	+5.7866	4	68
7	5	(Australia) James Courtney	Tickford Racing	46	+6.7384	9	64
8	88	(Australia) Broc Feeney	Triple Eight Race Engineering	46	+6.9346	12	60
9	56	(Australia) Jake Kostecki	Tickford Racing	46	+7.3494	3	56
10	35	(Australia) Todd Hazelwood	Matt Stone Racing	46	+7.6989	7	52
11	26	(Australia) David Reynolds	Grove Racing	46	+8.0454	8	48
12	25	(Australia) Chaz Mostert	Walkinshaw Andretti United	46	+9.8403	21	46
13	3	(Australia) Tim Slade	Blanchard Racing Team	46	+11.0967	16	44
14	76	(Australia) Garry Jacobson	PremiAir Racing	46	+11.4322	14	42
15	22	(New Zealand) Chris Pither	PremiAir Racing	46	+11.5295	13	40
16	18	(Australia) Mark Winterbottom	Team 18	46	+11.6916	25	38
17	34	(Australia) Jack Le Brocq	Matt Stone Racing	46	+12.5442	15	36
18	2	(Australia) Nick Percat	Walkinshaw Andretti United	46	+12.9934	24	34
19	96	(Australia) Macauley Jones	Brad Jones Racing	46	+13.2242	22	32
20	55	(Australia) Thomas Randle	Tickford Racing	45	+1 lap	17	30
21	10	(Australia) Lee Holdsworth	Grove Racing	44	+2 laps	19	28
NC	14	(Australia) Bryce Fullwood	Brad Jones Racing	46	not classified	18	0
Ret	4	(Australia) Jack Smith	Brad Jones Racing	45	crash	23	0
Ret	9	(Australia) Will Brown	Erebus Motorsport	34	electrical	6	0
Ret	20	(Australia) Scott Pye	Team 18	1	crash	20	0

=== Race 3 ===
Pos	No.	Driver	Team	Laps	Time / Retired	Grid	Points
1	97	(New Zealand) Shane van Gisbergen	Triple Eight Race Engineering	46	46:06.4142	1	100
2	5	(Australia) James Courtney	Tickford Racing	46	+1.913	8	92
3	17	(Australia) Will Davison	Dick Johnson Racing	46	+2.2131	2	86
4	11	(Australia) Anton De Pasquale	Dick Johnson Racing	46	+2.476	3	80
5	9	(Australia) Will Brown	Erebus Motorsport	46	+4.2573	7	74
6	26	(Australia) David Reynolds	Grove Racing	46	+5.2374	4	68
7	6	(Australia) Cam Waters	Tickford Racing	46	+5.5096	6	64
8	35	(Australia) Todd Hazelwood	Matt Stone Racing	46	+5.9719	16	60
9	8	(New Zealand) Andre Heimgartner	Brad Jones Racing	46	+6.4009	10	56
10	3	(Australia) Tim Slade	Blanchard Racing Team	46	+6.8339	17	52
11	88	(Australia) Broc Feeney	Triple Eight Race Engineering	46	+7.5898	5	48
12	10	(Australia) Lee Holdsworth	Grove Racing	46	+7.6319	18	46
13	34	(Australia) Jack Le Brocq	Matt Stone Racing	46	+8.0405	22	44
14	14	(Australia) Bryce Fullwood	Brad Jones Racing	46	+8.4094	21	42
15	2	(Australia) Nick Percat	Walkinshaw Andretti United	46	+9.2583	25	40
16	96	(Australia) Macauley Jones	Brad Jones Racing	46	+4.4968	20	38
17	22	(New Zealand) Chris Pither	PremiAir Racing	46	+9.9209	13	36
18	4	(Australia) Jack Smith	Brad Jones Racing	46	+10.3906	23	34
19	25	(Australia) Chaz Mostert	Walkinshaw Andretti United	46	+10.4006	24	32
20	18	(Australia) Mark Winterbottom	Team 18	46	+10.7623	15	30
21	99	(Australia) Brodie Kostecki	Erebus Motorsport	46	+1:08.8289	11	28
22	55	(Australia) Thomas Randle	Tickford Racing	45	+1 lap	14	26
Ret	56	(Australia) Jake Kostecki	Tickford Racing	44	crash	9	0
Ret	76	(Australia) Garry Jacobson	PremiAir Racing	39	transaxle	12	0

== Championship standings after the race ==
Drivers' Championship standings

	Pos.	Driver	Points
Unchanged	1	(New Zealand) Shane van Gisbergen	1087
Unchanged	2	(Australia) Anton de Pasquale	923
	3	(Australia) Will Davison	876
	4	(Australia) Cam Waters	751
	5	(Australia) Chaz Mostert	745

Teams' Championship standings

	Pos.	Constructor	Points
Unchanged	1	(Australia) Triple Eight Race Engineering	1812
Unchanged	2	(Australia) Dick Johnson Racing	1799
	3	(Australia) Tickford Racing	1390
	4	(Australia) Walkinshaw Andretti United	1268
	5	(Australia) Erebus Motorsport	1241

- Note: Only the top five positions are included for standings.
