= 2022 Adelaide 500 =

Motor racing event

(South Australia) 2022 Adelaide 500
Event Information
- Round 13 of 13 in the 2022 Supercars Championship
- Layout of the Adelaide Street Circuit
- Date: 1–4 December 2022
- Location: Adelaide, South Australia
- Venue: Adelaide Street Circuit
- Weather: Fine

Results
Race 1
| Distance | 78 laps | 251.160 km |
| Pole position | (Australia) Cam Waters; Tickford Racing | 1:19.3716 |
| Winner | (Australia) Chaz Mostert; Walkinshaw Andretti United | 1:54:11.4097 |
Race 2
| Distance | 78 laps | 251.160 km |
| Pole position | (Australia) Anton De Pasquale; Dick Johnson Racing | 1:19.3823 |
| Winner | (Australia) Broc Feeney; Triple Eight Race Engineering | 1:54:21.5942 |

The 2022 Adelaide 500 (known for commercial reasons as the 2022 VALO Adelaide 500) was a motor racing event for the Supercars Championship held from Thursday 1 December through to Sunday 4 December 2022. The event was held at the Adelaide Street Circuit in Adelaide, South Australia, and was the twenty-third running of the Adelaide 500. It was the last event of thirteen in the 2022 Supercars Championship and consisted of two races of 250 kilometres.

The races were supported by Touring Car Masters, GT World Challenge, S5000 Tasman Series, Aussie Racing Cars and Dunlop Super2 & Super3 Series.

== Results ==
=== Practice ===
| Session | Day | Fastest lap | | | | | |
| Session | Day | No. | Driver | Team | Car | Time | Ref. |
|---|---|---|---|---|---|---|---|
| Practice 1 | Thursday | 55 | (Australia) Thomas Randle | Tickford Racing | Ford Mustang GT | 1:19.8035 | |
| Practice 2 | Friday | 1 | (New Zealand) Shane van Gisbergen | Triple Eight Race Engineering | Holden Commodore ZB | 1:19.1992 | |
| Practice 3 | Friday | 25 | (Australia) Chaz Mostert | Walkinshaw Andretti United | Holden Commodore ZB | 1:18.8571 | |

=== Race 1 ===
==== Qualifying ====
| Pos. | No. | Driver | Team | Car | Qualifying | Shootout |
|---|---|---|---|---|---|---|
| 1 | 6 | (Australia) Cam Waters | Tickford Racing | Ford Mustang GT | 1:18.9779 | 1:19.3716 |
| 2 | 20 | (Australia) Scott Pye | Team 18 | Holden Commodore ZB | 1:18.8233 | 1:19.7153 |
| 3 | 11 | (Australia) Anton De Pasquale | Dick Johnson Racing | Ford Mustang GT | 1:18.8092 | 1:19.7463 |
| 4 | 5 | (Australia) James Courtney | Tickford Racing | Ford Mustang GT | 1:18.9278 | 1:19.8587 |
| 5 | 8 | (New Zealand) Andre Heimgartner | Brad Jones Racing | Holden Commodore ZB | 1:19.1436 | 1:19.9021 |
| 6 | 31 | (Australia) James Golding | PremiAir Racing | Holden Commodore ZB | 1:19.0862 | 1:19.9259 |
| 7 | 25 | (Australia) Chaz Mostert | Walkinshaw Andretti United | Holden Commodore ZB | 1:18.6763 | 1:20.0129 |
| 8 | 35 | (Australia) Todd Hazelwood | Matt Stone Racing | Holden Commodore ZB | 1:19.1864 | 1:20.0991 |
| 9 | 26 | (Australia) David Reynolds | Grove Racing | Ford Mustang GT | 1:19.0002 | DSQ (Note: David Reynolds started the race in 10th as a result of the disqualification) |
| 10 | 55 | (Australia) Thomas Randle | Tickford Racing | Ford Mustang GT | 1:19.2011 | no time (Note: Thomas Randle started the race in 9th as a result of David Reynolds' disqualification) |
| 11 | 10 | (Australia) Lee Holdsworth | Grove Racing | Ford Mustang GT | 1:19.2159 | |
| 12 | 3 | (Australia) Tim Slade | Blanchard Racing Team | Ford Mustang GT | 1:19.2228 | |
| 13 | 99 | (Australia) Brodie Kostecki | Erebus Motorsport | Holden Commodore ZB | 1:19.2253 | |
| 14 | 34 | (Australia) Jack Le Brocq | Matt Stone Racing | Holden Commodore ZB | 1:19.2497 | |
| 15 | 17 | (Australia) Will Davison | Dick Johnson Racing | Ford Mustang GT | 1:19.2613 | |
| 16 | 9 | (Australia) Will Brown | Erebus Motorsport | Holden Commodore ZB | 1:19.2743 | |
| 17 | 88 | (Australia) Broc Feeney | Triple Eight Race Engineering | Holden Commodore ZB | 1:19.2951 | |
| 18 | 96 | (Australia) Macauley Jones | Brad Jones Racing | Holden Commodore ZB | 1:19.3013 | |
| 19 | 14 | (Australia) Bryce Fullwood | Brad Jones Racing | Holden Commodore ZB | 1:19.3484 | |
| 20 | 2 | (Australia) Nick Percat | Walkinshaw Andretti United | Holden Commodore ZB | 1:19.3923 | |
| 21 | 18 | (Australia) Mark Winterbottom | Team 18 | Holden Commodore ZB | 1:19.3960 | |
| 22 | 56 | (Australia) Jake Kostecki | Tickford Racing | Ford Mustang GT | 1:19.4000 | |
| 23 | 22 | (New Zealand) Chris Pither | PremiAir Racing | Holden Commodore ZB | 1:19.7042 | |
| 24 | 4 | (Australia) Jack Smith | Brad Jones Racing | Holden Commodore ZB | 1:20.1724 | |
| 25 | 1 | (New Zealand) Shane van Gisbergen | Triple Eight Race Engineering | Holden Commodore ZB | 1:22.3383 | |

==== Race ====
| Pos. | No. | Driver | Team | Car | Laps | Time / Retired | Grid | Points |
|---|---|---|---|---|---|---|---|---|
| 1 | 25 | (Australia) Chaz Mostert | Walkinshaw Andretti United | Holden Commodore ZB | 78 | 1:54:11.4097 | 7 | 150 |
| 2 | 2 | (Australia) Nick Percat | Walkinshaw Andretti United | Holden Commodore ZB | 78 | +1.9794 | 20 | 138 |
| 3 | 5 | (Australia) James Courtney | Tickford Racing | Ford Mustang GT | 78 | +2.6951 | 4 | 129 |
| 4 | 99 | (Australia) Brodie Kostecki | Erebus Motorsport | Holden Commodore ZB | 78 | +4.4961 | 13 | 120 |
| 5 | 3 | (Australia) Tim Slade | Blanchard Racing Team | Ford Mustang GT | 78 | +5.7623 | 12 | 111 |
| 6 | 18 | (Australia) Mark Winterbottom | Team 18 | Holden Commodore ZB | 78 | +7.9420 | 21 | 102 |
| 7 | 17 | (Australia) Will Davison | Dick Johnson Racing | Ford Mustang GT | 78 | +13.2577 | 15 | 96 |
| 8 | 88 | (Australia) Broc Feeney | Triple Eight Race Engineering | Holden Commodore ZB | 78 | +14.2911 | 17 | 90 |
| 9 | 8 | (New Zealand) Andre Heimgartner | Brad Jones Racing | Holden Commodore ZB | 78 | +15.6446 | 5 | 84 |
| 10 | 10 | (Australia) Lee Holdsworth | Grove Racing | Ford Mustang GT | 78 | +16.1970 | 11 | 78 |
| 11 | 26 | (Australia) David Reynolds | Grove Racing | Ford Mustang GT | 78 | +18.9210 | 10 | 72 |
| 12 | 96 | (Australia) Macauley Jones | Brad Jones Racing | Holden Commodore ZB | 78 | +19.7636 | 18 | 69 |
| 13 | 6 | (Australia) Cam Waters | Tickford Racing | Ford Mustang GT | 78 | +22.2119 | 1 | 66 |
| 14 | 11 | (Australia) Anton De Pasquale | Dick Johnson Racing | Ford Mustang GT | 78 | +28.9519 | 3 | 63 |
| 15 | 55 | (Australia) Thomas Randle | Tickford Racing | Ford Mustang GT | 78 | +30.3293 | 9 | 60 |
| 16 | 56 | (Australia) Jake Kostecki | Tickford Racing | Ford Mustang GT | 78 | +30.8554 | 22 | 57 |
| 17 | 14 | (Australia) Bryce Fullwood | Brad Jones Racing | Holden Commodore ZB | 78 | +52.2552 | 19 | 54 |
| 18 | 34 | (Australia) Jack Le Brocq | Matt Stone Racing | Holden Commodore ZB | 75 | +3 Laps | 14 | 51 |
| 19 | 22 | (New Zealand) Chris Pither | PremiAir Racing | Holden Commodore ZB | 71 | +7 Laps | 23 | 48 |
| 20 | 1 | (New Zealand) Shane van Gisbergen | Triple Eight Race Engineering | Holden Commodore ZB | 65 | +13 Laps | 25 | 45 |
| 21 | 4 | (Australia) Jack Smith | Brad Jones Racing | Holden Commodore ZB | 61 | +17 Laps | 24 | 42 |
| 22 | 9 | (Australia) Will Brown | Erebus Motorsport | Holden Commodore ZB | 61 | +17 Laps | 16 | 39 |
| NC | 20 | (Australia) Scott Pye | Team 18 | Holden Commodore ZB | 57 | crash damage | 2 | |
| NC | 35 | (Australia) Todd Hazelwood | Matt Stone Racing | Holden Commodore ZB | 52 | crash | 8 | |
| NC | 31 | (Australia) James Golding | PremiAir Racing | Holden Commodore ZB | 11 | crash damage | 6 | |

=== Race 2 ===
==== Qualifying ====
| Pos. | No. | Driver | Team | Car | Qualifying | Shootout |
|---|---|---|---|---|---|---|
| 1 | 11 | (Australia) Anton De Pasquale | Dick Johnson Racing | Ford Mustang GT | 1:19.1704 | 1:19.3823 |
| 2 | 17 | (Australia) Will Davison | Dick Johnson Racing | Ford Mustang GT | 1:19.3935 | 1:19.5682 |
| 3 | 88 | (Australia) Broc Feeney | Triple Eight Race Engineering | Holden Commodore ZB | 1:19.4278 | 1:19.6147 |
| 4 | 1 | (Australia) Shane van Gisbergen | Triple Eight Race Engineering | Holden Commodore ZB | 1:19.3679 | 1:19.6670 |
| 5 | 25 | (Australia) Chaz Mostert | Walkinshaw Andretti United | Holden Commodore ZB | 1:19.3469 | 1:19.6771 |
| 6 | 6 | (Australia) Cam Waters | Tickford Racing | Ford Mustang GT | 1:19.1091 | 1:19.7734 |
| 7 | 9 | (Australia) Will Brown | Erebus Motorsport | Holden Commodore ZB | 1:19.4085 | 1:19.8289 |
| 8 | 8 | (New Zealand) Andre Heimgartner | Brad Jones Racing | Holden Commodore ZB | 1:19.4214 | 1:19.9222 |
| 9 | 35 | (Australia) Todd Hazelwood | Matt Stone Racing | Holden Commodore ZB | 1:19.4569 | 1:20.3340 |
| 10 | 26 | (Australia) David Reynolds | Grove Racing | Ford Mustang GT | 1:19.5448 | 1:20.3443 |
| 11 | 34 | (Australia) Jack LeBrocq | Matt Stone Racing | Holden Commodore ZB | 1:19.5454 | |
| 12 | 31 | (Australia) James Golding | PremiAir Racing | Holden Commodore ZB | 1:19.5565 | |
| 13 | 18 | (Australia) Mark Winterbottom | Team 18 | Holden Commodore ZB | 1:19.5865 | |
| 14 | 99 | (Australia) Brodie Kostecki | Erebus Motorsport | Holden Commodore ZB | 1:19.6312 | |
| 15 | 55 | (Australia) Thomas Randle | Tickford Racing | Ford Mustang GT | 1:19.6362 | |
| 16 | 56 | (Australia) Jake Kostecki | Tickford Racing | Ford Mustang GT | 1:19.6506 | |
| 17 | 3 | (Australia) Tim Slade | Blanchard Racing Team | Ford Mustang GT | 1:19.6547 | |
| 18 | 5 | (Australia) James Courtney | Tickford Racing | Ford Mustang GT | 1:19.7572 | |
| 19 | 20 | (Australia) Scott Pye | Team 18 | Holden Commodore ZB | 1:19.9079 | |
| 20 | 14 | (Australia) Bryce Fullwood | Brad Jones Racing | Holden Commodore ZB | 1:19.9452 | |
| 21 | 2 | (Australia) Nick Percat | Walkinshaw Andretti United | Holden Commodore ZB | 1:19.9516 | |
| 22 | 10 | (Australia) Lee Holdsworth | Grove Racing | Ford Mustang GT | 1:19.9872 | |
| 23 | 96 | (Australia) Macauley Jones | Brad Jones Racing | Holden Commodore ZB | 1:20.0264 | |
| 24 | 22 | (New Zealand) Chris Pither | PremiAir Racing | Holden Commodore ZB | 1:20.1036 | |
| 25 | 4 | (Australia) Jack Smith | Brad Jones Racing | Holden Commodore ZB | 1:20.4809 | |

==== Race ====
| Pos. | No. | Driver | Team | Car | Laps | Time / Retired | Grid | Points |
|---|---|---|---|---|---|---|---|---|
| 1 | 88 | (Australia) Broc Feeney | Triple Eight Race Engineering | Holden Commodore ZB | 78 | 1:54:21.5942 | 3 | 150 |
| 2 | 25 | (Australia) Chaz Mostert | Walkinshaw Andretti United | Holden Commodore ZB | 78 | +0.9644 | 5 | 138 |
| 3 | 11 | (Australia) Anton De Pasquale | Dick Johnson Racing | Ford Mustang GT | 78 | +9.4577 | 1 | 129 |
| 4 | 6 | (Australia) Cam Waters | Tickford Racing | Ford Mustang GT | 78 | +13.3764 | 6 | 120 |
| 5 | 8 | (New Zealand) Andre Heimgartner | Brad Jones Racing | Holden Commodore ZB | 78 | +13.9275 | 8 | 111 |
| 6 | 9 | (Australia) Will Brown | Erebus Motorsport | Holden Commodore ZB | 78 | +19.2510 | 7 | 102 |
| 7 | 1 | (New Zealand) Shane van Gisbergen | Triple Eight Race Engineering | Holden Commodore ZB | 78 | +26.2157 | 4 | 96 |
| 8 | 99 | (Australia) Brodie Kostecki | Erebus Motorsport | Holden Commodore ZB | 78 | +27.0253 | 14 | 90 |
| 9 | 10 | (Australia) Lee Holdsworth | Grove Racing | Ford Mustang GT | 78 | +28.2410 | 22 | 84 |
| 10 | 31 | (Australia) James Golding | PremiAir Racing | Holden Commodore ZB | 78 | +28.4446 | 12 | 78 |
| 11 | 18 | (Australia) Mark Winterbottom | Team 18 | Holden Commodore ZB | 78 | +30.4450 | 13 | 72 |
| 12 | 2 | (Australia) Nick Percat | Walkinshaw Andretti United | Holden Commodore ZB | 78 | +34.9141 | 21 | 69 |
| 13 | 3 | (Australia) Tim Slade | Blanchard Racing Team | Ford Mustang GT | 78 | +35.3328 | 17 | 66 |
| 14 | 20 | (Australia) Scott Pye | Team 18 | Holden Commodore ZB | 78 | +36.2603 | 19 | 63 |
| 15 | 26 | (Australia) David Reynolds | Grove Racing | Ford Mustang GT | 78 | +36.7994 | 10 | 60 |
| 16 | 22 | (New Zealand) Chris Pither | PremiAir Racing | Holden Commodore ZB | 78 | +50.4983 | 24 | 57 |
| 17 | 5 | (Australia) James Courtney | Tickford Racing | Ford Mustang GT | 78 | +53.2351 | 18 | 54 |
| 18 | 55 | (Australia) Thomas Randle | Tickford Racing | Ford Mustang GT | 78 | +54.8160 | 15 | 51 |
| 19 | 17 | (Australia) Will Davison | Dick Johnson Racing | Ford Mustang GT | 78 | +1:05.7878 | 2 | 48 |
| 20 | 4 | (Australia) Jack Smith | Brad Jones Racing | Holden Commodore ZB | 77 | +1 Lap | 25 | 45 |
| 21 | 35 | (Australia) Todd Hazelwood | Matt Stone Racing | Holden Commodore ZB | 71 | +7 Laps | 9 | 42 |
| 22 | 96 | (Australia) Macauley Jones | Brad Jones Racing | Holden Commodore ZB | 67 | +11 Laps | 23 | 39 |
| NC | 14 | (Australia) Bryce Fullwood | Brad Jones Racing | Holden Commodore ZB | 41 | crash | 20 | |
| NC | 34 | (Australia) Jack Le Brocq | Matt Stone Racing | Holden Commodore ZB | 37 | mechanical | 11 | |
| NC | 56 | (Australia) Jake Kostecki | Tickford Racing | Ford Mustang GT | 16 | crash | 16 | |

== Championship standings after the race ==
Drivers' Championship standings

| | Pos. | Driver | Points |
|---|---|---|---|
| Unchanged | 1 | (New Zealand) Shane van Gisbergen | 3523 |
| Unchanged | 2 | (Australia) Cam Waters | 2908 |
| Unchanged | 3 | (Australia) Chaz Mostert | 2835 |
| | 4 | (Australia) Anton De Pasquale | 2599 |
| | 5 | (Australia) Will Davison | 2573 |

Teams' Championship standings

| | Pos. | Constructor | Points |
|---|---|---|---|
| Unchanged | 1 | (Australia) Triple Eight Race Engineering | 5900 |
| Unchanged | 2 | (Australia) Dick Johnson Racing | 5172 |
| Unchanged | 3 | (Australia) Tickford Racing | 4656 |
| Unchanged | 4 | (Australia) Walkinshaw Andretti United | 4448 |
| Unchanged | 5 | (Australia) Grove Racing | 3866 |

- Note: Only the top five positions are included for both sets of standings.
