= 2022 Auckland SuperSprint =

Motor racing event in New Zealand

(New Zealand) 2022 ITM Auckland SuperSprint
Event Information
- Round 10 of 13 in the 2022 Supercars Championship
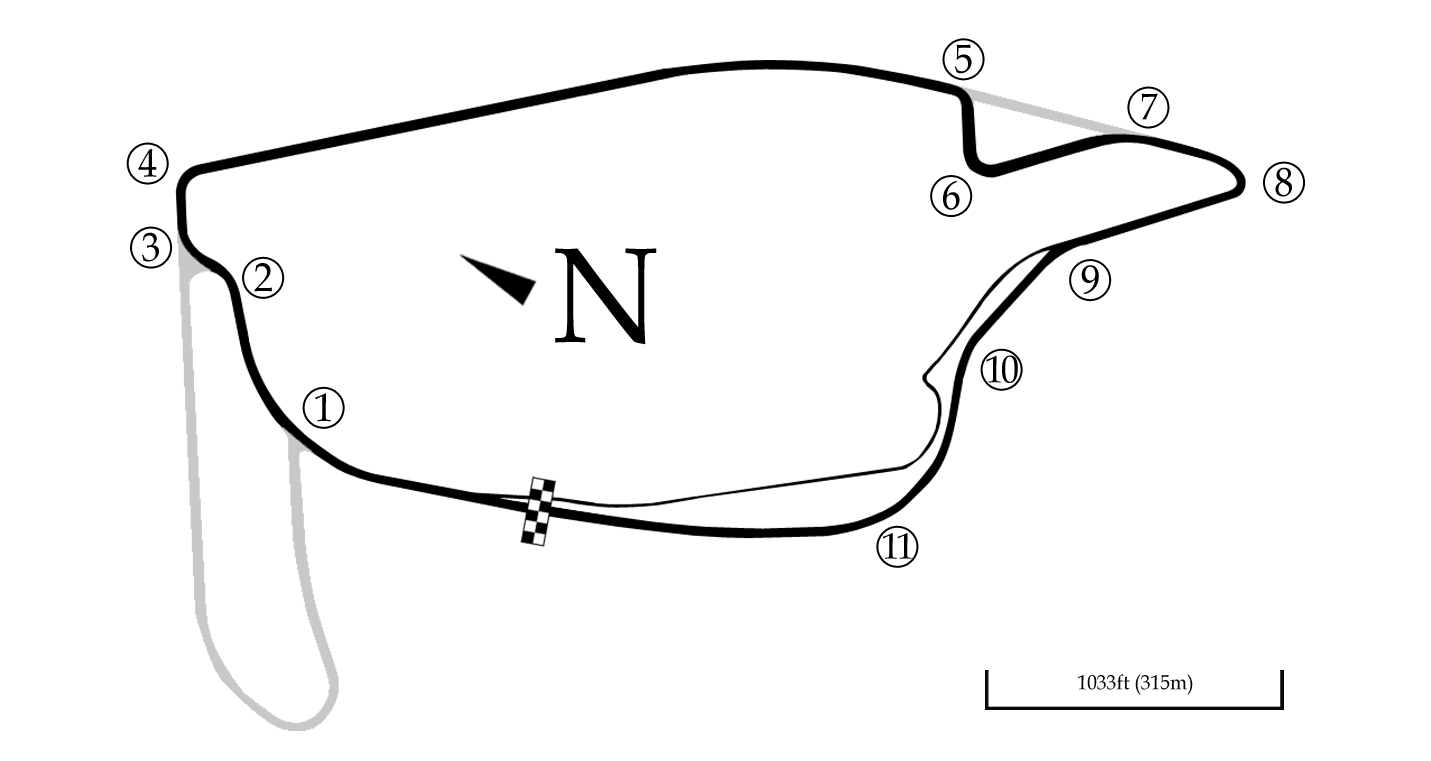
- Date: 9–11 September 2022
- Location: Pukekohe, New Zealand
- Venue: Pukekohe Park Raceway
- Weather: Sunny

Results
Race 1
Distance	41 laps	117 km
Pole position	Cam Waters; Tickford Racing	1:01.5480
Winner	Will Davison; Dick Johnson Racing	48:16.5956
Race 2
Distance	36 laps	103 km
Pole position	Shane van Gisbergen; Triple Eight Race Engineering	1:02.1092
Winner	Shane van Gisbergen; Triple Eight Race Engineering	1:01:06.3735
Race 3
Distance	41 laps	117 km
Pole position	Will Davison; Dick Johnson Racing	1:01.9211
Winner	Shane van Gisbergen; Triple Eight Race Engineering	1:17:38.7925

The 2022 ITM Auckland SuperSprint was a motor racing event for Supercars, held on the weekend of 9 to 11 September 2022. The event was held at Pukekohe Park Raceway near Pukekohe, New Zealand, and consisted of three races. It was the 10th event of thirteen in the 2022 Supercars Championship and hosted races 23 and 24 of the season.

The Dick Johnson Racing outfit started the weekend strong; setting the pace in the practice and qualifying sessions, and eventually resulting in Will Davison taking the first win of the weekend. Local hero Shane van Gisbergen fought back on Sunday to take a pole position and won the second race. He would also take victory in the final race in a highly acclaimed battle in the final laps with Cam Waters. With these results, van Gisbergen would capture the Jason Richards Memorial Trophy; an award given to the top points scorer for the New Zealand Supercars round.

This was the fifteenth, and to date, final running of the Auckland SuperSprint. It was also the final Supercars event to take place at Pukekohe and one of the last racing events to be held at the track before its permanent closure in early 2023. After a years hiatus, Supercars would return to New Zealand, with a new home being found in Taupō.

== Background ==
After 60 years of operation, it was announced that Pukekohe Park Raceway would cease motor racing activities in 2023 to make way for developments on the horse racing grounds. The demise of the racetrack led to a search for an alternative venue for future Supercars events. It was eventually decided that, starting from 2024, the series would resume New Zealand events at Taupo International Motorsport Park.

Waters sported the number 50 on his Tickford Racing car; replacing the number 6 he usually used. This was in tribute of Waters long-time sponsor, Enzed, who were celebrating their 50th anniversary as a company in 2023.

== Report ==
=== Practice ===
The Dick Johnson Racing pairing of Anton de Pasquale and Will Davison topping the first and second practice sessions respectively. Waters suffered a minor excursion in the first session, spearing off into the gravel at turn three and bringing out the red flag.

Practice summary
Session	Day	Fastest lap				
Session	Day	No.	Driver	Team	Car	Time
P1	Friday	11	(Australia) Anton de Pasquale	Dick Johnson Racing	Ford Mustang (S550)	1:02.2066
P2	Saturday	17	(Australia) Will Davison	Dick Johnson Racing	Ford Mustang (S550)	1:02.1524

=== Race 27 ===
==== Qualifying ====
Waters clinched pole position ahead of Davison and was the only driver to set a time below the 1:02 bracket. Davison would join him on the front row, with Chaz Mostert heading the second row and De Pasquale drawing alongside.

Pos	No	Driver	Team	Vehicle	Time
1	50	(Australia) Cam Waters	Tickford Racing	Ford Mustang (S550)	1:01.9984
2	17	(Australia) Will Davison	Dick Johnson Racing	Ford Mustang (S550)	1:02.0680
3	25	(Australia) Chaz Mostert	Walkinshaw Andretti United	Holden Commodore (ZB)	1:02.1218
4	11	(Australia) Anton de Pasquale	Dick Johnson Racing	Ford Mustang (S550)	1:02.2038
5	8	(Australia) Andre Heimgartner	Brad Jones Racing	Holden Commodore (ZB)	1:02.2199
6	20	(Australia) Scott Pye	Team 18	Holden Commodore (ZB)	1:02.3298
7	97	(New Zealand) Shane van Gisbergen	Triple Eight Race Engineering	Holden Commodore (ZB)	1:02.3355
8	88	(Australia) Broc Feeney	Triple Eight Race Engineering	Holden Commodore (ZB)	1:02.4311
9	31	(Australia) James Golding	PremiAir Racing	Holden Commodore (ZB)	1:02.4374
10	5	(Australia) James Courtney	Tickford Racing	Ford Mustang (S550)	1:02.5285
11	2	(Australia) Nick Percat	Walkinshaw Andretti United	Holden Commodore (ZB)	1:02.3866
12	14	(Australia) Tim Slade	Blanchard Racing Team	Ford Mustang (S550)	1:02.4127
13	56	(Australia) Jake Kostecki	Tickford Racing	Ford Mustang (S550)	1:02.4222
14	26	(Australia) David Reynolds	Grove Racing	Ford Mustang (S550)	1:02.4764
15	96	(Australia) Macauley Jones	Brad Jones Racing	Holden Commodore (ZB)	1:02.4801
16	55	(Australia) Thomas Randle	Tickford Racing	Ford Mustang (S550)	1:02.5404
17	4	(Australia) Jack Smith	Brad Jones Racing	Holden Commodore (ZB)	1:02.5507
18	18	(Australia) Mark Winterbottom	Team 18	Holden Commodore (ZB)	1:02.6181
19	34	(Australia) Jack Le Brocq	Matt Stone Racing	Holden Commodore (ZB)	1:02.6738
20	99	(Australia) Brodie Kostecki	Erebus Motorsport	Holden Commodore (ZB)	1:02.6799
21	14	(Australia) Bryce Fullwood	Brad Jones Racing	Holden Commodore (ZB)	1:02.9566
22	9	(Australia) Will Brown	Erebus Motorsport	Holden Commodore (ZB)	1:02.9991
23	10	(Australia) Lee Holdsworth	Grove Racing	Ford Mustang (S550)	1:03.0022
24	35	(Australia) Todd Hazelwood	Matt Stone Racing	Holden Commodore (ZB)	1:03.0424
25	22	(Australia) Chris Pither	PremiAir Racing	Holden Commodore (ZB)	1:03.0446

==== Race ====
Pos	No	Driver	Team	Laps	Time/Retired	Grid
1	17	(Australia) Will Davison	Dick Johnson Racing	41	48min 16.5956sec	2
2	8	(New Zealand) Andre Heimgartner	Brad Jones Racing	41	+ 0.865	5
3	50	(Australia) Cam Waters	Tickford Racing	41	+ 1.763	1
4	25	(Australia) Chaz Mostert	Walkinshaw Andretti United	41	+ 2.577	3
5	97	(New Zealand) Shane van Gisbergen	Triple Eight Race Engineering	41	+ 2.886	7
6	11	(Australia) Anton de Pasquale	Dick Johnson Racing	41	+ 4.715	4
7	88	(Australia) Broc Feeney	Triple Eight Race Engineering	41	+ 5.248	8
8	2	(Australia) Nick Percat	Walkinshaw Andretti United	41	+ 5.873	11
9	26	(Australia) David Reynolds	Grove Racing	41	+ 6.885	14
10	20	(Australia) Scott Pye	Team 18	41	+ 7.997	6
11	18	(Australia) Mark Winterbottom	Team 18	41	+ 8.400	18
12	10	(Australia) Lee Holdsworth	Grove Racing	41	+ 8.841	23
13	22	(New Zealand) Chris Pither	PremiAir Racing	41	+ 10.840	25
14	4	(Australia) Jack Smith	Brad Jones Racing	41	+ 11.365	17
15	35	(Australia) Todd Hazelwood	Matt Stone Racing	41	+ 11.781	24
16	55	(Australia) Thomas Randle	Tickford Racing	41	+ 12.365	16
17	31	(Australia) James Golding	PremiAir Racing	41	+ 12.791	9
18	5	(Australia) James Courtney	Tickford Racing	41	+ 13.797	10
19	9	(Australia) Will Brown	Erebus Motorsport	41	+ 14.480	22
20	99	(Australia) Brodie Kostecki	Erebus Motorsport	41	+ 25.229	20
21	56	(Australia) Jake Kostecki	Tickford Racing	38	+ 3 laps	13
22	14	(Australia) Bryce Fullwood	Brad Jones Racing	34	+ 7 laps	21
23	34	(Australia) Jack Le Brocq	Matt Stone Racing	33	+ 8 laps	19
NC	96	(Australia) Macauley Jones	Brad Jones Racing	28	+ 13 laps	15
Ret	3	(Australia) Tim Slade	Tim Blanchard Racing	0	Retired	12
Fastest Lap: Shane van Gisbergen (Triple Eight Race Engineering), 1:02.9504

=== Race 28 ===
==== Qualifying ====
Pos	No	Driver	Team	Vehicle	Time
1	97	(New Zealand) Shane van Gisbergen	Triple Eight Race Engineering	Holden Commodore (ZB)	1:02.1092
2	88	(Australia) Broc Feeney	Triple Eight Race Engineering	Holden Commodore (ZB)	1:02.1714
3	17	(Australia) Will Davison	Dick Johnson Racing	Ford Mustang (S550)	1:02.1777
4	11	(Australia) Anton de Pasquale	Dick Johnson Racing	Ford Mustang (S550)	1:02.1777
5	25	(Australia) Chaz Mostert	Walkinshaw Andretti United	Holden Commodore (ZB)	1:02.4588
6	20	(Australia) Scott Pye	Team 18	Holden Commodore (ZB)	1:02.5012
7	50	(Australia) Cam Waters	Tickford Racing	Ford Mustang (S550)	1:02.5289
8	26	(Australia) David Reynolds	Grove Racing	Ford Mustang (S550)	1:02.5289
9	99	(Australia) Brodie Kostecki	Erebus Motorsport	Holden Commodore (ZB)	1:02.5645
10	8	(New Zealand) Andre Heimgartner	Brad Jones Racing	Holden Commodore (ZB)	1:02.5707
11	56	(Australia) Jake Kostecki	Tickford Racing	Ford Mustang (S550)	1:02.5959
12	31	(Australia) James Golding	PremiAir Racing	Holden Commodore (ZB)	1:02.7093
13	34	(Australia) Jack Le Brocq	Matt Stone Racing	Holden Commodore (ZB)	1:02.7106
14	2	(Australia) Nick Percat	Walkinshaw Andretti United	Holden Commodore (ZB)	1:02.7977
15	14	(Australia) Bryce Fullwood	Brad Jones Racing	Holden Commodore (ZB)	1:02.8013
16	18	(Australia) Mark Winterbottom	Team 18	Holden Commodore (ZB)	1:02.8177
17	96	(Australia) Macauley Jones	Brad Jones Racing	Holden Commodore (ZB)	1:02.8587
18	10	(Australia) Lee Holdsworth	Grove Racing	Ford Mustang (S550)	1:02.9184
19	3	(Australia) Tim Slade	Tim Blanchard Racing	Ford Mustang (S550)	1:02.9217
20	35	(Australia) Todd Hazelwood	Matt Stone Racing	Holden Commodore (ZB)	1:03.0102
21	9	(Australia) Will Brown	Erebus Motorsport	Holden Commodore (ZB)	1:03.0621
22	55	(Australia) Thomas Randle	Tickford Racing	Ford Mustang (S550)	1:03.1068
23	4	(Australia) Jack Smith	Brad Jones Racing	Holden Commodore (ZB)	1:03.2706
24	5	(Australia) James Courtney	Tickford Racing	Ford Mustang (S550)	1:03.2816
25	22	(New Zealand) Chris Pither	PremiAir Racing	Holden Commodore (ZB)	1:03.3506

==== Race ====
Pos	No	Driver	Team	Laps	Time/Retired	Grid
1	97	(New Zealand) Shane van Gisbergen	Triple Eight Race Engineering	36	1hr 01min 06.3736sec	1
2	25	(Australia) Chaz Mostert	Walkinshaw Andretti United	36	+ 2.399	5
3	50	(Australia) Cam Waters	Tickford Racing	36	+ 4.475	7
4	17	(Australia) Will Davison	Dick Johnson Racing	36	+ 6.948	3
5	20	(Australia) Scott Pye	Team 18	36	+ 11.810	6
6	8	(New Zealand) Andre Heimgartner	Brad Jones Racing	36	+ 12.209	10
7	26	(Australia) David Reynolds	Grove Racing	36	+ 19.758	8
8	88	(Australia) Broc Feeney	Triple Eight Race Engineering	36	+ 22.098	2
9	56	(Australia) Jake Kostecki	Tickford Racing	36	+ 23.760	11
10	31	(Australia) James Golding	PremiAir Racing	36	+ 24.154	12
11	14	(Australia) Bryce Fullwood	Brad Jones Racing	36	+ 26.852	15
12	10	(Australia) Lee Holdsworth	Grove Racing	36	+ 27.599	18
13	96	(Australia) Macauley Jones	Brad Jones Racing	36	+ 32.709	17
14	2	(Australia) Nick Percat	Walkinshaw Andretti United	36	+ 33.110	14
15	3	(Australia) Tim Slade	Tim Blanchard Racing	36	+ 36.208	19
16	5	(Australia) James Courtney	Tickford Racing	36	+ 38.575	24
17	4	(Australia) Jack Smith	Brad Jones Racing	36	+ 42.104	23
18	99	(Australia) Brodie Kostecki	Erebus Motorsport	36	+ 42.473	9
19	22	(New Zealand) Chris Pither	PremiAir Racing	36	+ 42.880	25
20	35	(Australia) Todd Hazelwood	Matt Stone Racing	36	+ 43.779	20
21	55	(Australia) Thomas Randle	Tickford Racing	36	+ 53.171	22
22	18	(Australia) Mark Winterbottom	Team 18	35	+ 1 lap	16
NC	34	(Australia) Jack Le Brocq	Matt Stone Racing	30	+ 6 laps	13
Ret	11	(Australia) Anton de Pasquale	Dick Johnson Racing	0	Retired	4
Ret	9	(Australia) Will Brown	Erebus Motorsport	0	Retired	21
Fastest Lap: Shane van Gisbergen (Triple Eight Race Engineering), 1:03.3351

=== Race 29 ===
==== Qualifying ====
Pos	No	Driver	Team	Vehicle	Time
1	17	(Australia) Will Davison	Dick Johnson Racing	Ford Mustang (S550)	1:01.9211
2	50	(Australia) Cam Waters	Tickford Racing	Ford Mustang (S550)	1:02.1507
3	11	(Australia) Anton de Pasquale	Dick Johnson Racing	Ford Mustang (S550)	1:02.1641
4	88	(Australia) Broc Feeney	Triple Eight Race Engineering	Holden Commodore (ZB)	1:02.2157
5	8	(New Zealand) Andre Heimgartner	Brad Jones Racing	Holden Commodore (ZB)	1:02.2425
6	20	(Australia) Scott Pye	Team 18	Holden Commodore (ZB)	1:02.2605
7	26	(Australia) David Reynolds	Grove Racing	Ford Mustang (S550)	1:02.3050
8	97	(New Zealand) Shane van Gisbergen	Triple Eight Race Engineering	Holden Commodore (ZB)	1:02.3191
9	25	(Australia) Chaz Mostert	Walkinshaw Andretti United	Holden Commodore (ZB)	1:02.3481
10	2	(Australia) Nick Percat	Walkinshaw Andretti United	Holden Commodore (ZB)	1:02.4059
11	55	(Australia) Thomas Randle	Tickford Racing	Ford Mustang (S550)	1:02.4729
12	34	(Australia) Jack Le Brocq	Matt Stone Racing	Holden Commodore (ZB)	1:02.4879
13	99	(Australia) Brodie Kostecki	Erebus Motorsport	Holden Commodore (ZB)	1:02.4922
14	3	(Australia) Tim Slade	Tim Blanchard Racing	Ford Mustang (S550)	1:02.5095
15	18	(Australia) Mark Winterbottom	Team 18	Holden Commodore (ZB)	1:02.5186
16	14	(Australia) Bryce Fullwood	Brad Jones Racing	Holden Commodore (ZB)	1:02.5375
17	10	(Australia) Lee Holdsworth	Grove Racing	Ford Mustang (S550)	1:02.5836
18	31	(Australia) James Golding	PremiAir Racing	Holden Commodore (ZB)	1:02.5941
19	96	(Australia) Macauley Jones	Brad Jones Racing	Holden Commodore (ZB)	1:02.7347
20	35	(Australia) Todd Hazelwood	Matt Stone Racing	Holden Commodore (ZB)	1:02.8240
21	9	(Australia) Will Brown	Erebus Motorsport	Holden Commodore (ZB)	1:02.8455
22	22	(New Zealand) Chris Pither	PremiAir Racing	Holden Commodore (ZB)	1:02.9553
23	5	(Australia) James Courtney	Tickford Racing	Ford Mustang (S550)	1:02.9824
24	4	(Australia) Jack Smith	Brad Jones Racing	Holden Commodore (ZB)	1:03.0062
25	56	(Australia) Jake Kostecki	Tickford Racing	Ford Mustang (S550)	1:03.0971

==== Race ====
Pos	No	Driver	Team	Laps	Time/Retired	Grid
1	97	(New Zealand) Shane van Gisbergen	Triple Eight Race Engineering	41	54min 40.0655sec	8
2	50	(Australia) Cam Waters	Tickford Racing	41	+ 1.116	2
3	8	(New Zealand) Andre Heimgartner	Brad Jones Racing	41	+ 1.627	5
4	88	(Australia) Broc Feeney	Triple Eight Race Engineering	41	+ 3.214	4
5	11	(Australia) Anton de Pasquale	Dick Johnson Racing	41	+ 5.627	3
6	25	(Australia) Chaz Mostert	Walkinshaw Andretti United	41	+ 6.228	9
7	20	(Australia) Scott Pye	Team 18	41	+ 7.417	6
8	26	(Australia) David Reynolds	Grove Racing	41	+ 8.518	7
9	2	(Australia) Nick Percat	Walkinshaw Andretti United	41	+ 12.632	10
10	3	(Australia) Tim Slade	Tim Blanchard Racing	41	+ 12.963	14
11	31	(Australia) James Golding	PremiAir Racing	41	+ 18.021	18
12	18	(Australia) Mark Winterbottom	Team 18	41	+ 18.943	15
13	14	(Australia) Bryce Fullwood	Brad Jones Racing	41	+ 24.662	16
14	10	(Australia) Lee Holdsworth	Grove Racing	41	+ 25.318	17
15	56	(Australia) Jake Kostecki	Tickford Racing	41	+ 25.619	25
16	22	(New Zealand) Chris Pither	PremiAir Racing	41	+ 26.761	22
17	96	(Australia) Macauley Jones	Brad Jones Racing	41	+ 27.225	19
18	55	(Australia) Thomas Randle	Tickford Racing	41	+ 31.827	11
19	99	(Australia) Brodie Kostecki	Erebus Motorsport	41	+ 32.487	13
20	4	(Australia) Jack Smith	Brad Jones Racing	41	+ 34.659	24
21	34	(Australia) Jack Le Brocq	Matt Stone Racing	41	+ 37.293	12
22	17	(Australia) Will Davison	Dick Johnson Racing	40	+ 1 lap	1
23	35	(Australia) Todd Hazelwood	Matt Stone Racing	34	+ 7 laps	20
Ret	5	(Australia) James Courtney	Tickford Racing	0	Retired	23
Fastest Lap: Shane van Gisbergen (Triple Eight Race Engineering), 1:03.0287

== Aftermath ==
Following this round, Supercars would not return to New Zealand shores for 2023. The hiatus would only be year-long however as an alternative venue was found in Taupō for 2024. The Taupō Super400 would be held in late April and would be the first New Zealand Supercars event to utilise the Gen3 cars introduced at the start of that year. The Jason Richards Memorial Trophy would be carried over to this event and was won by De Pasquale.

Pukekohe Park Raceway would cease operations in early 2023 and the demolition process would begin in March 2024. Before the tracks closure, a public campaign was initiated to have the fabled track scanned for sim racing service, iRacing. In September 2022, it was confirmed that the track would be scanned for the service. Although, while the track had been scanned before demolition took place, a release date for the track on the service is currently unknown.

Van Gisbergen carried his momentum into the next round; the Bathurst 1000. Winning the event alongside Garth Tander, and once again dueling with Waters in the dying laps.

=== Championship standings ===
Drivers' Championship standings

Pos.	Driver	Points
1	(New Zealand) Shane van Gisbergen	2782
2	(Australia) Cam Waters	2257
3	(Australia) Will Davison	2180
4	(Australia) Anton de Pasquale	2113
5	(Australia) Chaz Mostert	2004

Teams' Championship standings

Pos.	Constructor	Points
1	Triple Eight Race Engineering	4634
2	Dick Johnson Racing	4293
3	Tickford Racing (5 & 6)	3678
4	Walkinshaw Andretti United	3254
5	Grove Racing	3050

- Note: Only the top five positions are included for both sets of standings.
