= 2022 Melbourne 400 =

Motor racing event

(Victoria (state)) 2022 Melbourne 400
Event Information
- Round 3 of 12 in the 2022 Supercars Championship
- Layout of the Albert Park Circuit
- Date: 8–10 April 2022
- Location: Melbourne, Victoria
- Venue: Albert Park Circuit

Results
Race 1
Distance	20 laps	106.040 km
Pole position	(Australia) David Reynolds; Grove Racing	105.6781
Winner	(Australia) Chaz Mostert; Walkinshaw Andretti United	37:15.6300
Race 2
Distance	19 laps	100.757 km
Pole position	(Australia) Will Davison; Dick Johnson Racing	104.9418
Winner	(New Zealand) Shane van Gisbergen; Triple Eight Race Engineering	41:54.8962
Race 3
Distance	20 laps	106.040 km
Pole position	(Australia) Anton de Pasquale; Dick Johnson Racing	105.8031
Winner	(New Zealand) Shane van Gisbergen; Triple Eight Race Engineering	36:51.5320
Race 4
Distance	20 laps	106.040 km
Pole position	(Australia) Will Davison; Dick Johnson Racing	105.3792
Winner	(Australia) Chaz Mostert; Walkinshaw Andretti United	39:09.2815
Round Results
First	(New Zealand) Shane van Gisbergen; Triple Eight Race Engineering	241 pts
Second	(Australia) Chaz Mostert; Walkinshaw Andretti United	224 pts
Third	(Australia) Tim Slade; Blanchard Racing Team	210 pts

The 2022 Melbourne 400 (known for commercial purpose as the 2022 Beaurepaires Melbourne 400) was a motor racing event held as a part of the 2022 Supercars Championship from Friday 8 April to Sunday 10 April 2022. The event was held at the Albert Park Circuit in Melbourne, Victoria, Australia. It was the third round of the 2022 Supercars Championship and consisted of four races of 106.040 kilometres each.

== Results ==
=== Race 1 ===
Pos	No.	Driver	Team	Laps	Time / Retired	Grid	Points
1	25	(Australia) Chaz Mostert	Walkinshaw Andretti United	20	37:15.6300	3	75
2	26	(Australia) David Reynolds	Grove Racing	20	+7.6838	1	69
3	97	(New Zealand) Shane van Gisbergen	Triple Eight Race Engineering	20	+9.4731	23	64
4	3	(Australia) Tim Slade	Blanchard Racing Team	20	+11.1534	12	60
5	2	(Australia) Nick Percat	Walkinshaw Andretti United	20	+13.0285	5	55
6	96	(Australia) Macauley Jones	Brad Jones Racing	20	+17.9486	8	51
7	18	(Australia) Mark Winterbottom	Team 18	20	+18.2434	11	48
8	88	(Australia) Broc Feeney	Triple Eight Race Engineering	20	+24.7155	17	45
9	76	(Australia) Garry Jacobson	PremiAir Racing	20	+29.4764	15	42
10	14	(Australia) Bryce Fullwood	Brad Jones Racing	20	+31.5081	19	39
11	20	(Australia) Scott Pye	Team 18	20	+49.1996	24	36
12	4	(Australia) Jack Smith	Brad Jones Racing	20	+55.4774	20	34
13	99	(Australia) Brodie Kostecki	Erebus Motorsport	20	+1:01.4965	13	33
14	8	(New Zealand) Andre Heimgartner	Brad Jones Racing	20	+1:04.6616	18	31
15	56	(Australia) Jake Kostecki	Tickford Racing	20	+1:05.5301	15	30
16	17	(Australia) Will Davison	Dick Johnson Racing	20	+1:05.9576	4	28
17	9	(Australia) Will Brown	Erebus Motorsport	20	+1:12.7419	16	27
18	6	(Australia) Cam Waters	Tickford Racing	20	+1:14.6544	7	25
19	35	(Australia) Todd Hazelwood	Matt Stone Racing	20	+1:23.7322	14	24
20	500	(Australia) James Courtney	Tickford Racing	20	+1:24.714	10	22
21	55	(Australia) Thomas Randle	Tickford Racing	20	+1:26.0519	9	21
22	10	(Australia) Lee Holdsworth	Grove Racing	20	+1:38.8105	5	19
23	11	(Australia) Anton de Pasquale	Dick Johnson Racing	19	+1 lap	2	18
24	22	(New Zealand) Chris Pither	PremiAir Racing	16	+4 laps	21	16
25	34	(Australia) Jack Le Brocq	Matt Stone Racing	16	+4 laps	22	15

=== Race 2 ===
Pos	No.	Driver	Team	Laps	Time / Retired	Grid	Points
1	97	(New Zealand) Shane van Gisbergen	Triple Eight Race Engineering	19	41:54.8962	3	75
2	26	(Australia) David Reynolds	Grove Racing	19	+2.0375	2	69
3	10	(Australia) Lee Holdsworth	Grove Racing	19	+7.0899	15	64
4	20	(Australia) Scott Pye	Team 18	19	+9.9748	12	60
5	35	(Australia) Todd Hazelwood	Matt Stone Racing	19	+12.9927	10	55
6	76	(Australia) Garry Jacobson	PremiAir Racing	19	+13.4971	21	51
7	99	(Australia) Brodie Kostecki	Erebus Motorsport	19	+14.4582	6	48
8	3	(Australia) Tim Slade	Blanchard Racing Team	19	+14.96946	20	45
9	500	(Australia) James Courtney	Tickford Racing	19	+15.2008	7	42
10	14	(Australia) Bryce Fullwood	Brad Jones Racing	19	+16.8638	17	39
11	96	(Australia) Macauley Jones	Brad Jones Racing	19	+16.9858	19	36
12	18	(Australia) Mark Winterbottom	Team 18	19	+19.7564	13	34
13	56	(Australia) Jake Kostecki	Tickford Racing	19	+19.7858	25	33
14	88	(Australia) Broc Feeney	Triple Eight Race Engineering	19	+29.9667	4	31
15	34	(Australia) Jack Le Brocq	Matt Stone Racing	19	+22.8738	14	30
16	22	(New Zealand) Chris Pither	PremiAir Racing	19	+24.072	24	28
17	2	(Australia) Nick Percat	Walkinshaw Andretti United	19	+24.712	9	27
18	55	(Australia) Thomas Randle	Tickford Racing	19	+25.8148	23	25
19	4	(Australia) Jack Smith	Brad Jones Racing	19	+25.824	16	24
20	11	(Australia) Anton De Pasquale	Dick Johnson Racing	19	+31.3648	5	22
21	6	(Australia) Cam Waters	Tickford Racing	19	+47.5985	11	21
22	25	(Australia) Chaz Mostert	Walkinshaw Andretti United	19	+50.4404	8	19
23	9	(Australia) Will Brown	Erebus Motorsport	19	+52.9355	22	18
24	17	(Australia) Will Davison	Dick Johnson Racing	18	+1 lap	1	16
Ret	8	(New Zealand) Andre Heimgartner	Brad Jones Racing	3	crash	18	0

=== Race 3 ===
Pos	No.	Driver	Team	Laps	Time / Retired	Grid	Points
1	97	(New Zealand) Shane van Gisbergen	Triple Eight Race Engineering	20	36:51.5320	3	75
2	17	(Australia) Will Davison	Dick Johnson Racing	20	+5.6474	2	69
3	26	(Australia) David Reynolds	Grove Racing	20	+6.5366	4	64
4	11	(Australia) Anton De Pasquale	Dick Johnson Racing	20	+10.6672	1	60
5	25	(Australia) Chaz Mostert	Walkinshaw Andretti United	20	+13.2716	7	55
6	88	(Australia) Broc Feeney	Triple Eight Race Engineering	20	+13.5495	8	51
7	3	(Australia) Tim Slade	Blanchard Racing Team	20	+15.8526	5	48
8	6	(Australia) Cam Waters	Tickford Racing	20	+21.2471	11	45
9	500	(Australia) James Courtney	Tickford Racing	20	+23.1066	6	42
10	76	(Australia) Garry Jacobson	PremiAir Racing	20	+24.3597	24	39
11	55	(Australia) Thomas Randle	Tickford Racing	20	+25.3226	16	36
12	34	(Australia) Jack Le Brocq	Matt Stone Racing	20	+27.1582	22	34
13	10	(Australia) Lee Holdsworth	Grove Racing	20	+27.184	15	33
14	35	(Australia) Todd Hazelwood	Matt Stone Racing	20	+29.3405	9	31
15	99	(Australia) Brodie Kostecki	Erebus Motorsport	20	+31.0445	17	30
16	2	(Australia) Nick Percat	Walkinshaw Andretti United	20	+31.5739	13	28
17	18	(Australia) Mark Winterbottom	Team 18	20	+33.3913	10	27
18	8	(New Zealand) Andre Heimgartner	Brad Jones Racing	20	+34.8211	21	25
19	22	(New Zealand) Chris Pither	PremiAir Racing	20	+37.3439	23	24
20	56	(Australia) Jake Kostecki	Tickford Racing	20	+37.7046	20	22
21	4	(Australia) Jack Smith	Brad Jones Racing	20	+38.435	25	21
22	14	(Australia) Bryce Fullwood	Brad Jones Racing	20	+43.9754	14	19
23	96	(Australia) Macauley Jones	Brad Jones Racing	20	+45.6031	18	18
24	9	(Australia) Will Brown	Erebus Motorsport	20	+1:33.9982	12	16
25	20	(Australia) Scott Pye	Team 18	19	+1 lap	19	15

=== Race 4 ===
Pos	No.	Driver	Team	Laps	Time / Retired	Grid	Points
1	25	(Australia) Chaz Mostert	Walkinshaw Andretti United	20	39:09:2815	3	75
2	17	(Australia) Will Davison	Dick Johnson Racing	20	+5.2168	1	69
3	11	(Australia) Anton De Pasquale	Dick Johnson Racing	20	+6.8791	2	64
4	3	(Australia) Tim Slade	Blanchard Racing Team	20	+8.1296	8	60
5	99	(Australia) Brodie Kostecki	Erebus Motorsport	20	+8.7869	9	55
6	2	(Australia) Nick Percat	Walkinshaw Andretti United	20	+9.6997	7	51
7	6	(Australia) Cam Waters	Tickford Racing	20	+12.6092	5	48
8	9	(Australia) Will Brown	Erebus Motorsport	20	+12.6759	15	45
9	18	(Australia) Mark Winterbottom	Team 18	20	+13.9282	17	42
10	10	(Australia) Lee Holdsworth	Grove Racing	20	+15.6673	14	39
11	20	(Australia) Scott Pye	Team 18	20	+16.0357	13	36
12	88	(Australia) Broc Feeney	Triple Eight Race Engineering	20	+17.964	11	34
13	56	(Australia) Jake Kostecki	Tickford Racing	20	+19.508	19	33
14	35	(Australia) Todd Hazelwood	Matt Stone Racing	20	+20.8794	25	31
15	76	(Australia) Garry Jacobson	PremiAir Racing	20	+21.8525	20	30
16	34	(Australia) Jack Le Brocq	Matt Stone Racing	20	+22.62004	23	28
17	8	(New Zealand) Andre Heimgartner	Brad Jones Racing	20	+22.6786	16	27
18	96	(Australia) Macauley Jones	Brad Jones Racing	20	+31.6496	18	25
19	14	(Australia) Bryce Fullwood	Brad Jones Racing	20	+32.8064	21	24
20	97	(New Zealand) Shane van Gisbergen	Triple Eight Race Engineering	20	+54.8585	6	22
21	22	(New Zealand) Chris Pither	PremiAir Racing	20	+1:06.0726	22	21
22	500	(Australia) James Courtney	Tickford Racing	20	+1:40.7479	10	19
Ret	55	(Australia) Thomas Randle	Tickford Racing	11	steering	4	0
Ret	26	(Australia) David Reynolds	Grove Racing	6	crash damage	12	0
Ret	4	(Australia) Jack Smith	Brad Jones Racing	0	clutch	24	0

== Championship standings after the race ==
Drivers' Championship standings

	Pos.	Driver	Points
Unchanged	1	(New Zealand) Shane van Gisbergen	803
Unchanged	2	(Australia) Anton de Pasquale	659
	3	(Australia) Chaz Mostert	641
	4	(Australia) Will Davison	622
Unchanged	5	(Australia) Brodie Kostecki	553

Teams Championship standings

	Pos.	Constructor	Points
Unchanged	1	(Australia) Triple Eight Race Engineering	1346
Unchanged	2	(Australia) Dick Johnson Racing	1281
Unchanged	3	(Australia) Walkinshaw Andretti United	1062
	4	(Australia) Erebus Motorsport	975
Unchanged	5	(Australia) Tickford Racing	940

- Note: Only the top five positions are included for standings.
