= 2025 Taupō Super 440 =

Motor racing event in Queensland, Australia

(New Zealand) 2025 Taupō Super 440
Event Information
- Round 3 of 13 in the 2025 Supercars Championship
- Layout of the Taupo International Motorsport Park
- Date: 11–13 April 2025
- Location: Taupō, New Zealand
- Venue: Taupo International Motorsport Park

Results
Race 1
Distance	37 laps	120 km
Pole position	(New Zealand) Matt Payne; Grove Racing	
Winner	(New Zealand) Matt Payne; Grove Racing	
Race 2
Distance	37 laps	120 km
Pole position	(Australia) Brodie Kostecki; Dick Johnson Racing	
Winner	(Australia) Chaz Mostert; Walkinshaw Andretti United	
Race 3
Distance	61 laps	200 km
Pole position	(Australia) Brodie Kostecki; Dick Johnson Racing	
Winner	(New Zealand) Matt Payne; Grove Racing	
Round Results
First	(New Zealand) Matt Payne; Grove Racing	287 pts
Second	(Australia) Chaz Mostert; Walkinshaw Andretti United	232 pts
Third	(Australia) Brodie Kostecki; Dick Johnson Racing	209 pts

The 2025 Taupō Super 440 (known for commercial reasons as the 2025 ITM Taupō Super 440) was a motor racing event for Supercars that was held on 11–13 April 2025 at the Taupo International Motorsport Park in the Taupō, New Zealand. The round consisted of two 120km races followed by a 200km final, and was the third round of the 2025 Supercars Championship. It was also that year's sole international event for the championship.

Matt Payne won both the first and third races of the weekend while Chaz Mostert won the second race. Payne would accumulate the most points of all drivers throughout the weekend, thus winning him the annual Jason Richards Memorial Trophy.

== Background ==
The event was held on the weekend of 11–13 April 2025. It was the second Supercars event to be held at the Taupo International Motorsport Park, and consisted of two 120 km races as well as one 200 km final.

=== Entry list ===
Twenty four cars were entered into the event — 14 sixth-generation Chevrolet Camaros and 11 seventh-generation Ford Mustangs. Only one driver change was made from the beginning of the season, with Aaron Cameron replacing Aaron Love at Blanchard Racing Team at the Melbourne SuperSprint.

Additionally, the Dick Johnson Racing cars would sport a one-off livery for the round. Owing to Shell V-Power fuel not being available in New Zealand, the Mustangs would carry Jet Couriers sponsorship in its place.

== Race report ==
The first race of the weekend saw Matt Payne take advantage of his pole position start; never relinquishing his lead at any point for the 37-lap race distance. In doing so, Payne became the fifth New Zealander to win a Supercars race in his home country, alongside Greg Murphy, Shane van Gisbergen, Scott McLaughlin and Andre Heimgartner. On lap 1, a collision between Cameron Hill and Cooper Murray saw the latter sent into the runoff. Hill would be punished with a 15-second time penalty. On lap 5, Thomas Randle attempted a move on Anton de Pasquale at turn one. However, in doing so, spun Chaz Mostert who was sent tumbling down the field. The safety car was deployed on lap 11 when Macauley Jones' car stopped on track due to an engine failure.

The second race was decided in somewhat controversial circumstances after late-race contact between Mostert and Brodie Kostecki. Kostecki lamented the perceived lack of enforcement against overly-aggressive driving which he opined cost him the win.

== Results ==
=== Race 1 ===
Pos.	No.	Driver	Team	Car	Laps	Time/Retired	Grid	Pts
1	19	(New Zealand) Matt Payne	Grove Racing	Ford Mustang S650	37	1:00:36.8158	1	85
2	6	(Australia) Cam Waters	Tickford Racing	Ford Mustang S650	37	+ 4.102	3	74
3	2	(New Zealand) Ryan Wood	Walkinshaw Andretti United	Ford Mustang S650	37	+ 4.960	4	68
4	18	(Australia) Anton de Pasquale	Team 18	Chevrolet Camaro ZL1	37	+ 5.230	8	62
5	1	(Australia) Will Brown	Triple Eight Race Engineering	Chevrolet Camaro ZL1	37	+ 13.370	13	57
6	9	(Australia) Jack Le Brocq	Erebus Motorsport	Chevrolet Camaro ZL1	37	+ 15.424	7	53
7	26	(Australia) Kai Allen	Grove Racing	Ford Mustang S650	37	+ 15.642	22	49
8	8	(New Zealand) Andre Heimgartner	Brad Jones Racing	Chevrolet Camaro ZL1	37	+ 16.400	14	45
9	31	(Australia) James Golding	PremiAir Racing	Chevrolet Camaro ZL1	37	+ 22.339	19	41
10	17	(Australia) Will Davison	Dick Johnson Racing	Ford Mustang S650	37	+ 24.110	5	38
11	20	(Australia) David Reynolds	Team 18	Chevrolet Camaro ZL1	37	+ 26.147	18	35
12	38	(Australia) Brodie Kostecki	Dick Johnson Racing	Ford Mustang S650	37	+ 26.483	2	32
13	25	(Australia) Chaz Mostert	Walkinshaw Andretti United	Ford Mustang S650	37	+ 26.720	6	29
14	4	(Australia) Cameron Hill	Matt Stone Racing	Chevrolet Camaro ZL1	37	+ 28.551	9	27
15	88	(Australia) Broc Feeney	Triple Eight Race Engineering	Chevrolet Camaro ZL1	37	+ 28.994	11	25
16	14	(Australia) Bryce Fullwood	Brad Jones Racing	Chevrolet Camaro ZL1	37	+ 29.513	15	23
17	62	(New Zealand) Richie Stanaway	PremiAir Racing	Chevrolet Camaro ZL1	37	+ 30.865	17	21
18	12	(New Zealand) Jaxon Evans	Brad Jones Racing	Chevrolet Camaro ZL1	37	+ 33.224	16	19
19	10	(Australia) Nick Percat	Matt Stone Racing	Chevrolet Camaro ZL1	37	+ 37.784	21	18
20	3	(Australia) Aaron Cameron	Blanchard Racing Team	Ford Mustang S650	37	+ 46.259	23	16
21	7	(Australia) James Courtney	Blanchard Racing Team	Ford Mustang S650	37	+ 50.446	24	15
22	55	(Australia) Thomas Randle	Tickford Racing	Ford Mustang S650	37	+ 53.394	12	14
23	99	(Australia) Cooper Murray	Erebus Motorsport	Chevrolet Camaro ZL1	37	+ 1:33.450	10	13
Ret	96	(Australia) Macauley Jones	Brad Jones Racing	Chevrolet Camaro ZL1	9	Engine	20	0
Fastest Lap: Matt Payne (Grove Racing) - 1:27.5318 on lap 16

=== Race 2 ===
Pos.	No.	Driver	Team	Car	Laps	Time/Retired	Grid	Pts
1	25	(Australia) Chaz Mostert	Walkinshaw Andretti United	Ford Mustang S650	37	56:14.2361	2	
2	17	(Australia) Will Davison	Dick Johnson Racing	Ford Mustang S650	37	+ 6.476	4	
3	38	(Australia) Brodie Kostecki	Dick Johnson Racing	Ford Mustang S650	37	+ 9.191	1	
4	19	(New Zealand) Matt Payne	Grove Racing	Ford Mustang S650	37	+ 9.818	7	
5	88	(Australia) Broc Feeney	Triple Eight Race Engineering	Chevrolet Camaro ZL1	37	+ 11.699	3	
6	55	(Australia) Thomas Randle	Tickford Racing	Ford Mustang S650	37	+ 21.526	10	
7	1	(Australia) Will Brown	Triple Eight Race Engineering	Chevrolet Camaro ZL1	37	+ 24.561	5	
8	8	(New Zealand) Andre Heimgartner	Brad Jones Racing	Chevrolet Camaro ZL1	37	+ 24.949	11	
9	2	(New Zealand) Ryan Wood	Walkinshaw Andretti United	Ford Mustang S650	37	+ 28.982	12	
10	26	(Australia) Kai Allen	Grove Racing	Ford Mustang S650	37	+ 29.179	8	
11	9	(Australia) Jack Le Brocq	Erebus Motorsport	Chevrolet Camaro ZL1	37	+ 31.751	14	
12	14	(Australia) Bryce Fullwood	Brad Jones Racing	Chevrolet Camaro ZL1	37	+ 35.014	16	
13	4	(Australia) Cameron Hill	Matt Stone Racing	Chevrolet Camaro ZL1	37	+ 35.905	17	
14	6	(Australia) Cam Waters	Tickford Racing	Ford Mustang S650	37	+ 39.971	6	
15	10	(Australia) Nick Percat	Matt Stone Racing	Chevrolet Camaro ZL1	37	+ 41.955	21	
16	96	(Australia) Macauley Jones	Brad Jones Racing	Chevrolet Camaro ZL1	37	+ 42.342	18	
17	20	(Australia) David Reynolds	Team 18	Chevrolet Camaro ZL1	37	+ 43.393	20	
18	31	(Australia) James Golding	PremiAir Racing	Chevrolet Camaro ZL1	37	+ 44.182	22	
19	12	(New Zealand) Jaxon Evans	Brad Jones Racing	Chevrolet Camaro ZL1	37	+ 44.684	19	
20	18	(Australia) Anton de Pasquale	Brad Jones Racing	Chevrolet Camaro ZL1	37	+ 47.913	9	
21	62	(New Zealand) Richie Stanaway	PremiAir Racing	Chevrolet Camaro ZL1	37	+ 50.717	13	
22	7	(Australia) James Courtney	Blanchard Racing Team	Ford Mustang S650	37	+ 1:02.128	24	
23	99	(Australia) Cooper Murray	Erebus Motorsport	Chevrolet Camaro ZL1	37	+ 1:02.425	15	
24	3	(Australia) Aaron Cameron	Blanchard Racing Team	Ford Mustang S650	37	+ 1:09.062	23	
Fastest Lap: Chaz Mostert (Walkinshaw Andretti United) - 1:28.6385 on lap 4

=== Race 3 ===
Pos.	No.	Driver	Team	Car	Laps	Time/Retired	Grid	Pts
1	19	(New Zealand) Matt Payne	Grove Racing	Ford Mustang S650	61	1:31:45.5077	6	
2	4	(Australia) Cameron Hill	Matt Stone Racing	Chevrolet Camaro ZL1	61	+ 3.194	4	
3	25	(Australia) Chaz Mostert	Walkinshaw Andretti United	Ford Mustang S650	61	+ 8.289	9	
4	38	(Australia) Brodie Kostecki	Dick Johnson Racing	Ford Mustang S650	61	+ 9.742	1	
5	55	(Australia) Thomas Randle	Tickford Racing	Ford Mustang S650	61	+ 13.782	5	
6	8	(New Zealand) Andre Heimgartner	Brad Jones Racing	Chevrolet Camaro ZL1	61	+ 15.515	8	
7	88	(Australia) Broc Feeney	Triple Eight Race Engineering	Chevrolet Camaro ZL1	61	+ 15.732	20	
8	1	(Australia) Will Brown	Triple Eight Race Engineering	Chevrolet Camaro ZL1	61	+ 22.146	12	
9	17	(Australia) Will Davison	Dick Johnson Racing	Ford Mustang S650	61	+ 25.459	13	
10	31	(Australia) James Golding	PremiAir Racing	Chevrolet Camaro ZL1	61	+ 26.901	10	
11	2	(New Zealand) Ryan Wood	Walkinshaw Andretti United	Ford Mustang S650	61	+ 28.442	3	
12	6	(Australia) Cam Waters	Tickford Racing	Ford Mustang S650	61	+ 28.666	18	
13	62	(New Zealand) Richie Stanaway	PremiAir Racing	Chevrolet Camaro ZL1	61	+ 29.206	17	
14	12	(New Zealand) Jaxon Evans	Brad Jones Racing	Chevrolet Camaro ZL1	61	+ 32.760	14	
15	9	(Australia) Jack Le Brocq	Erebus Motorsport	Chevrolet Camaro ZL1	61	+ 36.758	11	
16	18	(Australia) Anton de Pasquale	Team 18	Chevrolet Camaro ZL1	61	+ 37.510	2	
17	20	(Australia) David Reynolds	Team 18	Chevrolet Camaro ZL1	61	+ 38.358	19	
18	26	(Australia) Kai Allen	Grove Racing	Ford Mustang S650	61	+ 48.160	7	
19	96	(Australia) Macauley Jones	Brad Jones Racing	Chevrolet Camaro ZL1	61	+ 1:00.664	16	
20	7	(Australia) James Courtney	Blanchard Racing Team	Ford Mustang S650	61	+ 1:03.472	23	
21	3	(Australia) Aaron Cameron	Blanchard Racing Team	Ford Mustang S650	61	+ 1:08.994	24	
22	99	(Australia) Cooper Murray	Erebus Motorsport	Chevrolet Camaro ZL1	61	+ 1:10.151	15	
23	10	(Australia) Nick Percat	Matt Stone Racing	Chevrolet Camaro ZL1	61	+ 1:21.298	22	
24	14	(Australia) Bryce Fullwood	Brad Jones Racing	Chevrolet Camaro ZL1	61	+ 1:22.749	21	
Fastest Lap: Broc Feeney (Triple Eight Race Engineering) - 1:27.5377 on lap 50

== Aftermath ==
On the lead up to the weekend, rumours persisted of a second New Zealand-based round in the South Island slated for the 2027 season. One month later, plans would be confirmed for an event at Euromarque Motorsport Park in Christchurch as part of a double-header in conjunction with the Taupō round.

== Championship standings after the round ==
Drivers' Championship standings

	Pos.	Driver	Points
Unchanged	1	(Australia) Will Brown	651
Unchanged	2	(Australia) Cam Waters	617
	3	(New Zealand) Matt Payne	605
	4	(Australia) Broc Feeney	590
	5	(Australia) Chaz Mostert	565
	6	(Australia) Brodie Kostecki	540
	7	(Australia) Cameron Hill	540
	8	(Australia) Anton De Pasquale	429
Unchanged	9	(Australia) Thomas Randle	427
	10	(New Zealand) Andre Heimgartner	426

Teams' Championship standings

	Pos.	Constructor	Points
Unchanged	1	Triple Eight Race Engineering	1241
Unchanged	2	Tickford Racing	1044
Unchanged	3	Walkinshaw Andretti United	943
Unchanged	4	Dick Johnson Racing	929
	5	Grove Racing	877

- Note: Only the top ten positions are shown for drivers' standings and top five for teams'.
