= PremiAir Racing =

Australian Motor Racing Team

- Manufacturer: Chevrolet
- Race Drivers: 31. Jayden Ojeda; 36. Cooper Murray
- Race Engineers: 31. Andrew Gilliam; 36. Simon Hodge
- Chassis: Camaro ZL1
- Debut: 2022
- 2025 position: 10th

PremiAir Racing are an Australian motor racing team currently competing in ANDRA Top Fuel and the Supercars Championship, where it fields two Chevrolet Camaro ZL1s. The teams current drivers are Jayden Ojeda and Cooper Murray. The team is owned by Peter Xiberras, the managing director of PremiAir Hire and himself a Top Fuel drag racing champion. As of 2026 the team has achieved 1 pole position, and 3 podiums.

== History ==
=== Top Fuel ===
PremiAir Racing has competed in ANDRA Top Fuel events since 2014.

== Supercars ==
=== 2022 ===
In January 2022, PremiAir Racing bought Tekno Autosports Supercars team, six weeks prior to the 2022 Supercars Championship's scheduled commencement date at Sydney Motorsport Park. Tekno, branded as Team Sydney since 2020, had competed in the series since 2011 as an independent team. The teams inaugural driver lineup was Garry Jacobson and Chris Pither. On 21 June 2022, PremiAir Racing terminated the contract of Jacobson effective immediately after the Darwin Triple Crown. During his time at the team Jacobson secured three top 10s, all coming during the Australian GP weekend. On 5 July, it was announced that James Golding would replace Jacobson for the remainder of the season. Golding secured top 10 finishes at Sandown, Auckland, and Adelaide. Meanwhile, Pither finished the season 20th in the drivers standings, with a single top 10 at the Gold Coast.

=== 2023 ===
On 14 October, PremiAir confirmed the departure of Chris Pither at the end of the 2022 season. A week later PremiAir revealed that Tim Slade would be signing on to the team for the 2023 season, replacing Pither. Later, PremiAir confirmed that James Golding would continue with the team for the 2023 season. For 2023 and the new Gen3 cars, PremiAir along with all other Holden teams switched to the Chevrolet Camaro ZL1 after General Motors shut down the Holden brand. Golding ended the year 16th in the championship, with a 4th in Newcastle, the teams maiden fastest lap in Perth, and four further top 10s. Slade ended the year 19th, with nine top 10s.

=== 2024 ===
For 2024, both James Golding and Tim Slade continued with the team. Golding claimed both the teams first pole in Darwin (which he would covert to 4th in the race) and their first podium at Sandown with David Russell, along with another nine top 10s enroute to ending the year 7th in the championship. Slade would end up 20th with five top 10s.

=== 2025 ===
2025 saw New Zealand born Richie Stanaway join the team as Golding's team mate, replacing Slade and racing under #62 which was his fathers original racing number. However after the 2025 Gold Coast round, having secured just three top 10 finishes all season and having crashed out of a top 5 position late in the Bathurst 1000, Stanaway was released from the team, replaced by Jayden Ojeda who had already signed with the team for 2026. Meanwhile, Golding finished the season 14th in the championship, with ten top 10s. His, and the teams highlight of the season, came at the Bathurst 1000 when again racing with David Russell, he crossed the line 1st, before a penalty demoted them to 3rd, securing just the 2nd podium in PremiAir's history.

=== 2026 ===
In late September 2025, PremiAir confirmed the departure of James Golding at the end of the season. In mid October 2025, the team announced that Jayden Ojeda and Declan Fraser would join the team in 2026 to replace both Golding and Stanaway. In 2026 Roland Dane joined the team as team principal. Following the Bathurst 1000, having secured just one top 10 finish all season and after being significantly outperformed by rookie teammate Ojeda, Declan Fraser was released from the remainder of his contract, and replaced with Erebus Motorsport sophomore driver Cooper Murray. The decision would pay-off when, in just his second round with the team, Murray finished 3rd at the Sunday race of the Sandown 500, scoring his maiden career podium, and PremiAir's third, but the first to come in a non-endurance round.

== GT3 ==
PremiAir would make their GT3 debut at the 2023 Bathurst 12 Hour, racing an Audi R8 LMS Evo II in Pro-Am class with James Golding, Brad Schumacher and Frédéric Vervisch. After qualifying 12th, they'd retire after 243 laps with engine issues.

== Results ==
=== Car no. 31 results ===
Year	Driver	No.	Make	1	2	3	4	5	6	7	8	9	10	11	12	13	14	15	16	17	18	19	20	21	22	23	24	25	26	27	28	29	30	31	32	33	34	35	36	37	Position	Pts
2022	Garry Jacobson	76	Holden	SMP; R1; 18	SMP; R2; Ret	SYM; R3; 16	SYM; R4; Ret	SYM; R5; 20	MEL; R6; 9	MEL; R7; 6	MEL; R8; 10	MEL; R9; 15	BAR; R10; 18	BAR; R11; 14	BAR; R12; Ret	WIN; R13; 19	WIN; R14; Ret	WIN; R15; 16	HID; R16; 22	HID; R17; 18	HID; R18; 22																				26th	513
2022	James Golding	31	Holden																			TOW; R19; 23	TOW; R20; 21	BEN; R21; 19	BEN; R22; 23	BEN; R23; 14	SAN; R24; 13	SAN; R25; 9	SAN; R26; 19	PUK; R27; 17	PUK; R28; 10	PUK; R29; 11	BAT; R30; 12	SUR; R31; 19	SUR; R32; Ret	ADE; R33; Ret	ADE; R34; 10				25th	708
2023	James Golding	31	Chevrolet	NEW; R1; 18	NEW; R2; 4	MEL; R3; 22	MEL; R4; 21	MEL; R5; 19	MEL; R6; 16	BAR; R7; 14	BAR; R8; 11	BAR; R9; 11	SYM; R10; 14	SYM; R11; 9	SYM; R12; 16	HID; R13; 14	HID; R14; 6	HID; R15; 20	TOW; R16; 20	TOW; R17; 12	SMP; R18; 12	SMP; R19; 16	BEN; R20; 14	BEN; R21; 23	BEN; R22; 15	SAN; R23; 15	BAT; R24; 10	SUR; R25; 17	SUR; R26; 6	ADE; R27; 13	ADE; R28; 20										16th	1569
2024	James Golding	31	Chevrolet	BAT1; R1; 18	BAT1; R2; 5	MEL; R3; 23	MEL; R4; 16	MEL; R5; 12	MEL; R6; 11	TAU; R7; 7	TAU; R8; 5	BAR; R9; 14	BAR; R10; 16	HID; R11; 4	HID; R12; 4	TOW; R13; 16	TOW; R14; 10	SMP; R15; 14	SMP; R16; 9	SYM; R17; 14	SYM; R18; 13	SAN; R19; 3	BAT2; R20; 6	SUR; R21; 16	SUR; R22; 13	ADE; R23; 15	ADE; R24; 8														7th	1991
2025	James Golding	31	Chevrolet	SMP; R1; 22	SMP; R2; 9	SMP; R3; 8	MEL; R4; 23	MEL; R5; 13	MEL; R6; 23	MEL; R7; C	TAU; R8; 9	TAU; R9; 18	TAU; R10; 10	SYM; R11; 8	SYM; R12; 6	SYM; R13; 4	BAR; R14; 13	BAR; R15; 14	BAR; R16; 22	HID; R17; 16	HID; R18; 15	HID; R19; 17	TOW; R20; 18	TOW; R21; Ret	TOW; R22; 13	QLD; R23; 14	QLD; R24; 14	QLD; R25; 9	BEN; R26; 25	BAT; R27; 3	SUR; R28; 12	SUR; R29; 17	SAN; R30; 10	SAN; R31; 20	ADE; R32; 15	ADE; R33; 14	ADE; R34; 17				14th	1458
2026	Jayden Ojeda	31	Chevrolet	SYD; R1; 13	SYD; R2; 21	SYD; R3; 19	MEL; R4; 16	MEL; R5; 18	MEL; R6; 13	MEL; R7; 7	TAU; R8; 18	TAU; R9; 14	CHC; R10; 12	CHR; R11; 8	CHR; R12; 11	CHR; R13; 14	SYM; R14; 10	SYM; R15; 14	SYM; R16; 6	HID; R17; 9	HID; R18; 10	HID; R19; 13	TOW; R20; 9	TOW; R21; 11	TOW; R22; 10	BAR; R23; 20	BAR; R24; 18	BAR; R25; 8	QLD; R26; 18	QLD; R27; 24	QLD; R28; 18	BEN; R29; 5	BAT; R30; 12	SUR; R31; 10	SUR; R32; 19	SAN; R33; 13	SAN; R34; 9	ADE; R35	ADE; R36	ADE; R37	14th*	1599*

=== Car no. 36 results ===
Year	Driver	No.	Make	1	2	3	4	5	6	7	8	9	10	11	12	13	14	15	16	17	18	19	20	21	22	23	24	25	26	27	28	29	30	31	32	33	34	35	36	37	Position	Pts
2022	Chris Pither	22	Holden	SMP; R1; 23	SMP; R2; 20	SYM; R3; 20	SYM; R4; 13	SYM; R5; 16	MEL; R6; 24	MEL; R7; 16	MEL; R8; 19	MEL; R9; 21	BAR; R10; 24	BAR; R11; 15	BAR; R12; 17	WIN; R13; 26	WIN; R14; 24	WIN; R15; 22	HID; R16; 23	HID; R17; 22	HID; R18; 20	TOW; R19; 19	TOW; R20; 18	BEN; R21; 24	BEN; R22; 12	BEN; R23; 18	SAN; R24; 25	SAN; R25; 16	SAN; R26; 21	PUK; R27; 13	PUK; R28; 19	PUK; R29; 16	BAT; R30; 21	SUR; R31; 16	SUR; R32; 9	ADE; R33; 19	ADE; R34; 16				20th	1257
2023	Tim Slade	23	Chevrolet	NEW; R1; 22	NEW; R2; 9	MEL; R3; 20	MEL; R4; 13	MEL; R5; 8	MEL; R6; 15	BAR; R7; 7	BAR; R8; 24	BAR; R9; 8	SYM; R10; 6	SYM; R11; 7	SYM; R12; 25	HID; R13; 10	HID; R14; 11	HID; R15; 18	TOW; R16; 18	TOW; R17; 23	SMP; R18; 6	SMP; R19; 12	BEN; R20; 16	BEN; R21; 18	BEN; R22; 22	SAN; R23; 9	BAT; R24; 13	SUR; R25; 21	SUR; R26; Ret	ADE; R27; 16	ADE; R28; 16										19th	1497
2024	Tim Slade	23	Chevrolet	BAT1; R1; 17	BAT1; R2; 17	MEL; R3; 15	MEL; R4; 10	MEL; R5; 8	MEL; R6; 10	TAU; R7; Ret	TAU; R8; 21	BAR; R9; 12	BAR; R10; 22	HID; R11; 12	HID; R12; 13	TOW; R13; 23	TOW; R14; 17	SMP; R15; 15	SMP; R16; 12	SYM; R17; 8	SYM; R18; 10	SAN; R19; 12	BAT; R20; 19	SUR; R21; 18	SUR; R22; 17	ADE; R23; 20	ADE; R24; 14														20th	1380
2025	Richie Stanaway	62	Chevrolet	SMP; R1; 23	SMP; R2; Ret	SMP; R3; 17	MEL; R4; 16	MEL; R5; 21	MEL; R6; 11	MEL; R7; C	TAU; R8; 17	TAU; R9; 21	TAU; R10; 13	SYM; R11; 10	SYM; R12; 22	SYM; R13; 5	BAR; R14; 24	BAR; R15; 17	BAR; R16; 14	HID; R17; 22	HID; R18; Ret	HID; R19; 18	TOW; R20; 16	TOW; R21; 15	TOW; R22; 14	QLD; R23; 15	QLD; R24; 18	QLD; R25; 10	BEN; R26; 23	BAT; R27; Ret	SUR; R28; 19	SUR; R29; Ret									24th	768
2025	Jayden Ojeda	62	Chevrolet																														SAN; R30; 20	SAN; R31; 18	ADE; R32; 16	ADE; R33; 20	ADE; R34; 19				25th	400
2026	Declan Fraser	777	Chevrolet	SYD; R1; 19	SYD; R2; 12	SYD; R3; 21	MEL; R4; 22	MEL; R5; 12	MEL; R6; 15	MEL; R7; 11	TAU; R8; 14	TAU; R9; 23	CHR; R10; 18	CHR; R11; 20	CHR; R12; 22	CHR; R13; 10	SYM; R14; 16	SYM; R15; 23	SYM; R16; 17	HID; R17; 20	HID; R18; 15	HID; R19; 18	TOW; R20; 21	TOW; R21; 21	TOW; R22; 21	BAR; R23; 21	BAR; R24; 12	BAR; R25; 16	QLD; R26; 23	QLD; R27; 16	QLD; R28; 19	BEN; R29; Ret	BAT; R30; 18								24th	788
2026	Cooper Murray	36	Chevrolet																															SUR; R31; 11	SUR; R32; 17	SAN; R33; 7	SAN; R34; 3	ADE; R35	ADE; R36	ADE; R37	17th*	1295*

=== Bathurst 1000 results ===
Year	No.	Car	Drivers	Position	Laps
2022	22	Holden Commodore ZB	(New Zealand) Chris Pither (Australia) Cameron Hill	21st	153
2022	31	Holden Commodore ZB	(Australia) James Golding (Australia) Dylan O'Keeffe	12th	161
2023	23	Chevrolet Camaro ZL1	(Australia) Tim Slade (Australia) Jonathon Webb	13th	161
2023	31	Chevrolet Camaro ZL1	(Australia) James Golding (Australia) Dylan O'Keeffe	10th	161
2024	23	Chevrolet Camaro ZL1	(Australia) Tim Slade (Australia) Cameron McLeod	19th	161
2024	31	Chevrolet Camaro ZL1	(Australia) James Golding (Australia) David Russell	6th	161
2025	31	Chevrolet Camaro ZL1	(Australia) James Golding (Australia) David Russell	3rd	161
2025	62	Chevrolet Camaro ZL1	(New Zealand) Richie Stanaway (Australia) Nash Morris	Ret	143
2026	31	Chevrolet Camaro ZL1	(Australia) Jayden Ojeda (Australia) David Russell	12th	161
2026	777	Chevrolet Camaro ZL1	(Australia) Declan Fraser (Australia) Nash Morris	18th	160

=== Bathurst 12 Hour results ===
Year	Team	Drivers	Car	Class	Laps	Position	Class pos.
2023	(Australia) PremiAir Racing	(Australia) James Golding (Australia) Brad Schumacher (Belgium) Frédéric Vervisch	Audi R8 LMS Evo II	Pro-Am	243	DNF	

== Race drivers ==
Drivers indicated with italics were Endurance Cup co-drivers.

- (New Zealand) Chris Pither (2022)
- (Australia) Garry Jacobson (2022)
- (Australia) James Golding (2022–2025)
- (Australia) Dylan O'Keeffe (2022–2023)
- (Australia) Cameron Hill (2022)
- (Australia) Tim Slade (2023–2024)
- (Australia) Jonathon Webb (2023)
- (Australia) David Russell (2024–present)
- (Australia) Cameron McLeod (2024)
- (New Zealand) Richie Stanaway (2025)
- (Australia) Nash Morris (2025–Present)
- (Australia) Jayden Ojeda (2025–Present)
- (Australia) Declan Fraser (2026)
- (Australia) Cooper Murray (2026–Present)
