= Peter Vale (motorsport) =

Australian motorsports executive

- Citizenship: Australian
- Occupation: Motorsports Executive
- Employer: PremiAir Racing
- Title: Team manager

Peter Vale is an Australian Formula One and motorsport mechanic and executive. He is currently the team manager for the PremiAir Racing Supercars Championship team.

== Career ==
Vale began his career in Formula One in 1990 with Team Lotus, working as a mechanic until 1995. He then joined McLaren, initially serving as a Number 2 mechanic before being promoted to Number 1 mechanic for Mika Häkkinen. He was subsequently appointed chief mechanic of the McLaren test team, and in 2006 became chief mechanic of the race team, a position he held until the end of the 2011 season. In 2012 he transitioned into a broader organisational role as engineering coordinator, remaining with McLaren until 2013.

In 2014, Vale joined Williams Racing as team manager. In this position, he was responsible for overseeing trackside operations, managing logistics and personnel coordination during race weekends, and acting as a key liaison between the team and the FIA on sporting and regulatory matters. The role also involved managing race-team procedures, operational compliance and overall event execution. Vale moved to Manor Racing in 2016, serving as chief mechanic and assistant team manager during the team’s final Formula One campaign.

After his Formula One tenure, Vale returned to Australia and joined Brad Jones Racing as team manager in the Supercars Championship, a role he held from 2017 to 2021. In 2022, he was appointed Team Principal of Matt Stone Racing, remaining in the position until 2025. In 2025, Vale joined PremiAir Racing as team manager.
