= Ryan Wood (racing driver) =

New Zealand racing driver

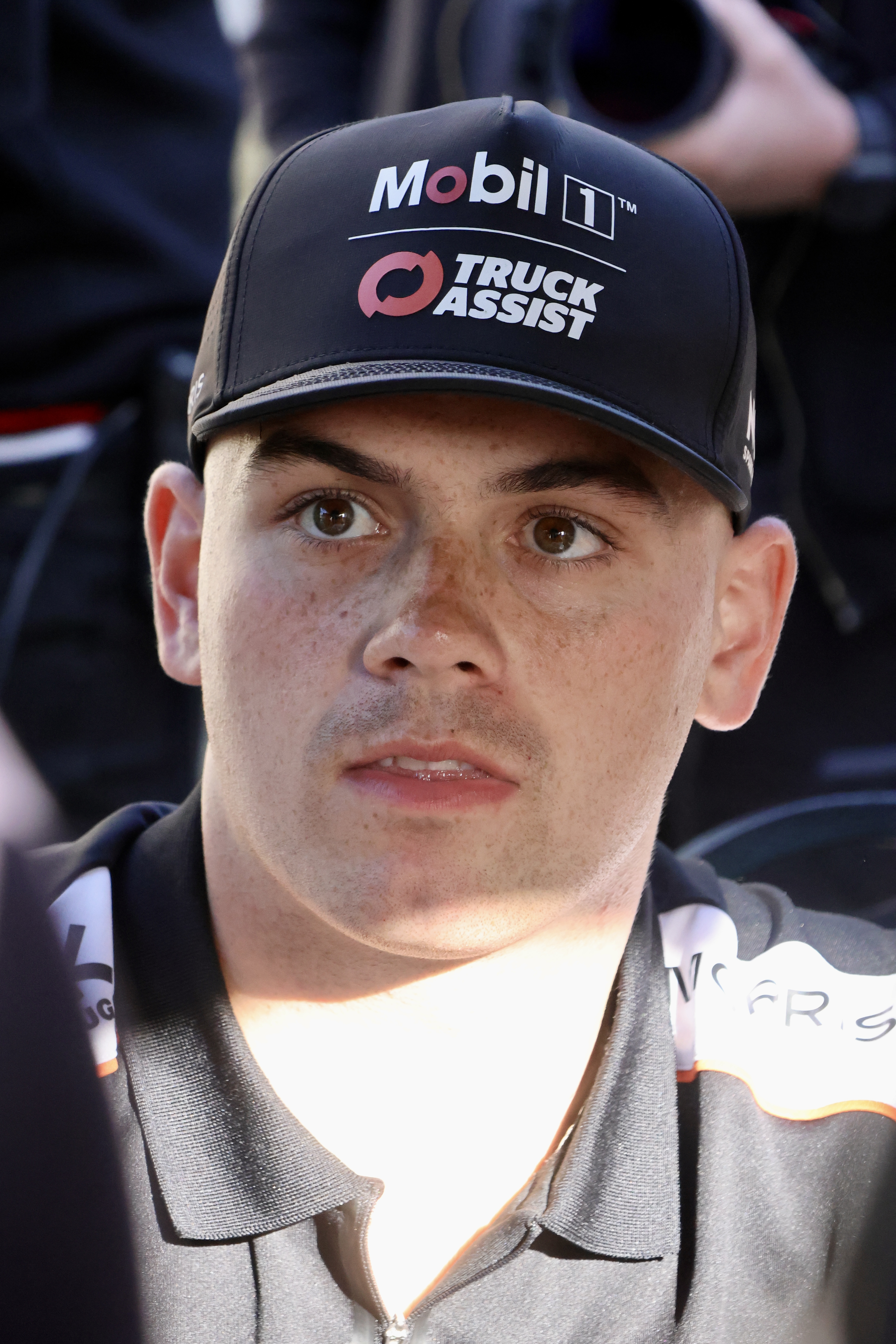
- Wood at the Adelaide Grand Final in 2025
- Nationality: New Zealander
- Born: Ryan Ian Thomas Wood; 4 December 2003 (age 22) Wellington, New Zealand

Supercars Championship career
- Debut season: 2024
- Current team: Walkinshaw TWG Racing
- Categorisation: FIA Silver (until 2024); FIA Gold (2025–)
- Car number: 2
- Starts: 83
- Wins: 2
- Podiums: 13
- Poles: 5
- Fastest laps: 4
- Best finish: 10th in 2025

Previous series
- 2026 2025 2023 2022 2022 2020–2021: Formula Regional Oceania; GT World Challenge Aust. Super2 Series; Porsche Sprint Challenge Aust. TGR Australia 86; Toyota 86 New Zealand

Ryan Ian Thomas Wood (born 4 December 2003) is a New Zealand racing driver from Wellington, New Zealand. He is currently competing in the Supercars Championship with Walkinshaw TWG Racing, driving the No. 2 Toyota GR Supra.

== Early and personal life ==
Ryan Ian Thomas Wood was born on 4 December 2003 in Wellington, New Zealand. Wood came from a racing family, albeit in a different discipline to the one in which Ryan would begin his career.

Wood counts his father, as well as former racing driver Greg Murphy, as his great mentors.

== Racing career ==
=== Sports car racing ===
Wood began his pro racing career in sports car racing, taking part in the Toyota Finance 86 Championship before graduating to Porsche Sprint Challenge Australia in 2022. In his lone season in the competition, supported by Team Porsche New Zealand and Earl Bamber Motorsport, he scored a double victory in the opening round at Sydney before taking victories at The Bend and Bathurst. The championship fight between himself and Tom Sargent came down to the final round at Phillip Island, where Wood would ultimately finish second in the championship despite sweeping the weekend. Wood had secured Porsche New Zealand's scholarship to compete in the Porsche Carrera Cup Australia, but forfeited the offer to compete in Super2 full-time in 2023.

Wood returned to sports car racing in 2025, taking part in the GT World Challenge Australia alongside fellow Kiwi Steve Brooks. The duo scored five podium finishes over the course of the season and were classified fourth in the Pro-Am championship.

=== Super2 Series ===
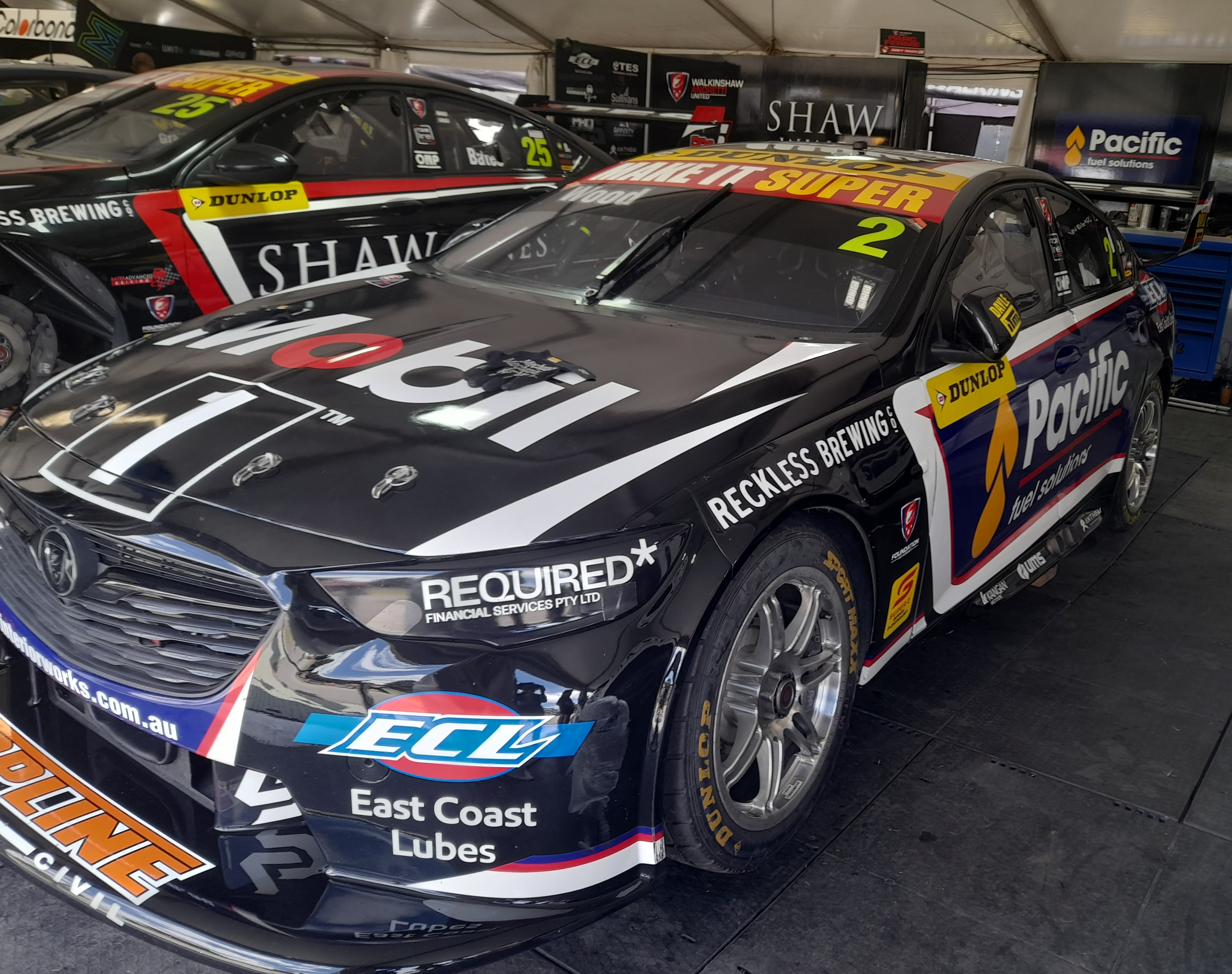
Wood placed third in the 2023 Dunlop Super2 Series.

After a strong season in the Porsche Sprint Challenge the year prior, Wood was offered a seat with Walkinshaw Andretti United for the 2023 Super2 Series. He would be racing in the No. 2 Holden Commodore ZB.

The season started in Newcastle with Wood finishing in eighth place. For Race 2 of the weekend, he qualified the No. 2 WAU Holden on pole position. However, he was caught out in an incident during the race. The next round was held at Wanneroo Raceway in Perth. Wood won both races that weekend, solidifying his challenge for the title. The next few rounds were a bit up and down, which meant he was on the backfoot going into the season final in Adelaide. He dominated the weekend, winning both races from Pole, but that was insufficient to secure the title. Wood eventually finishing the season in third.

=== Supercars Championship ===
Following his strong 2023 Super2 Series Campaign, Walkinshaw Andretti United confirmed that they had signed Wood to race for the team full time in 2024, replacing Nick Percat in the No. 2 Mustang. Upon his debut at Bathurst, he was the only driver on the grid who had never taken part in a Supercars race. Wood's arrival was cited early on as a 'big culture shift' within the organization, rectifying a soured relationship held between WAU and Percat at the conclusion of the 2023 season. Wood endured a quiet rookie season, finishing a season-best fourth at Taupo before a repeat performance followed at Wanneroo. He concluded the season 16th in the drivers' championship.

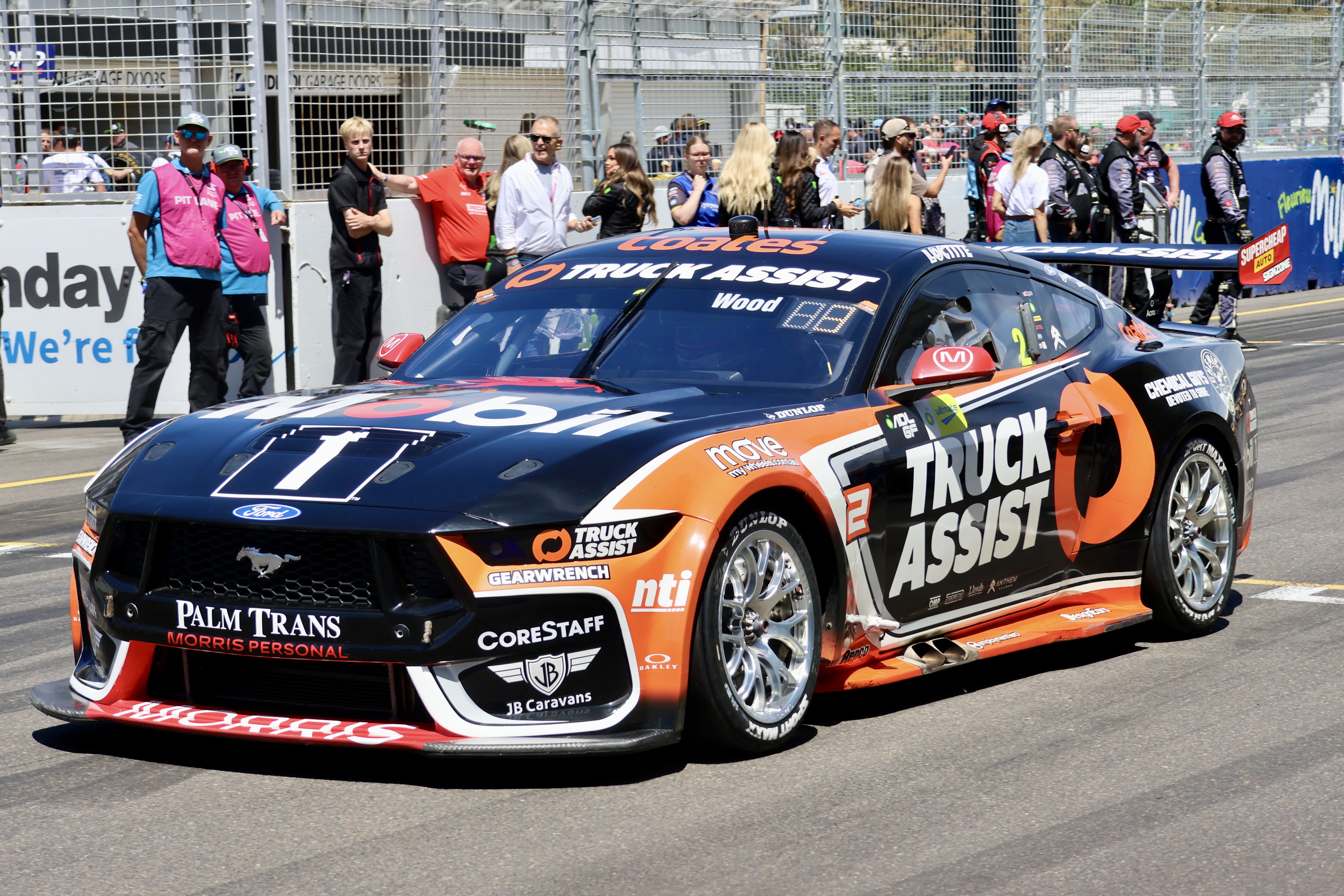
Wood's Mustang on the grid at Adelaide in 2025.

Over the offseason, Wood embarked on a fitness plan which saw him lose 25 kilograms before the start of the 2025 season. Wood cited his disappointing rookie season as a catalyst to change his mindset off the track, stating that he would "leave no stone unturned" in his effort to climb to the top of the Supercars grid. During round three of the season, Wood claimed his first Supercars podium finish, bettering his best result at Taupo from 2024 with a third-place finish in race one. He referred to the moment as "a monkey off the back," and was spurred on by the race being in his home country, with compatriot Matt Payne taking the race victory. Upon the series' return to Perth in June, Wood claimed his first series victory, a moment he described as the achievement of "[a] lifelong dream." Wood added another pair of podiums at Queensland to conclude the Sprint Cup, before an electrical failure stymied his chance at winning the Bathurst 1000 alongside Jayden Ojeda. Wood also qualified for the first ever Supercars Finals Series by securing a top-ten finish in the regular season standings.

Wood scored pole for the opening round of the Gold Coast 500, but was eliminated from contention before Sandown. He would score three more podiums in the final five races, taking tenth in the championship. The Supercars website ranked Wood as No. 4 in its top ten Supercars drivers of the season, highlighting his relationship with teammate and season champion Chaz Mostert as well as his qualifying prowess as key contributors to his ranking.

=== Open-wheel racing ===
For 2026, Wood was confirmed to compete in the 2026 Formula Regional Oceania Trophy. Wood's primary goal was to develop a new set of skills through the open-wheel discipline, with the aim of taking them back to Supercars to "better himself as a driver."

== Racing record ==
=== Karting career summary ===
Season	Series	Position
2012	New Zealand Schools Kart Championship - Cadet	20th
2012	North Island Sprint Championship - Cadet	17th
2012	44th Blossom Festival - Cadet	10th
2013	New Zealand Schools Kart Championship - Cadet	5th
2013	New Zealand Sprint Championship - Cadet	14th
2013	New Zealand Top Half Series - Cadet	23rd
2013	North Island Sprint Championship - Cadet	**2nd**
2013	CIK Trophy of New Zealand - Cadet	7th
2013	45th Blossom Festival - Cadet	**2nd**
2014	New Zealand Sprint Championship - 100cc Junior Restricted	10th
2014	New Zealand Schools Kart Championship - 100cc Junior Restricted	4th
2014	Bridgestone International Final - Vortex Mini ROK	12th
2014	46th Blossom Festival - Vortex Mini ROK	**1st**
2015	New Zealand Sprint Championship - Vortex Mini ROK	20th
2015	New Zealand Schools Kart Championship - Vortex Mini ROK	**1st**
2015	47th Blossom Festival - Vortex Mini ROK	**1st**
2016	New Zealand Sprint Championship - 100cc Junior Yamaha	**2nd**
2016	New Zealand Sprint Championship - Junior Rotax	22nd
2016	RMC New Zealand - Junior Rotax	**2nd**
2016	New Zealand Schools Kart Championship - Formula Junior	**2nd**
2016	New Zealand Schools Kart Championship - 100cc Junior Yamaha	**1st**
2017	New Zealand Sprint Championship - 100cc Junior Yamaha	4th
2017	New Zealand Sprint Championship - Junior Rotax	**2nd**
2017	New Zealand Schools Kart Championship - 100cc Junior Yamaha	**3rd**
2017	RMC New Zealand - Junior Max	**1st**
2017	RMC World Grand Final - Junior Max	9th
2017	New Zealand Schools Kart Championship - Rotax Junior	4th
2017	49th Blossom Festival - Rotax Junior	**3rd**
2018	New Zealand Sprint Championship - Junior Max	**2nd**
2018	RMC New Zealand - Junior Max	**3rd**
2018	New Zealand Schools Kart Championship - Junior Rotax	4th
2018	50th Blossom Festival - Rotax Junior	**3rd**
2019	New Zealand Sprint Championship - Rotax Max DD2	**1st**
2019	New Zealand Sprint Championship - KZ2	5th
2019	CIK Trophy of New Zealand - KZ2	8th
2019	Race of Stars - KZ2	28th
2019	Australian Kart Championship - X30	7th
2019	New Zealand Schools Kart Championship - Rotax Light	**1st**
2019	Australian Kart Championship - KA3 Senior	45th

=== Career summary ===
Season	Series	Team	Races	Wins	Poles	F/laps	Podiums	Points	Position
2020	Best Bars Toyota 86 Championship New Zealand	Ryan Wood Motorsport	14	0	0	1	1	404	10th
2021	Best Bars Toyota 86 Championship New Zealand	Ryan Wood Motorsport	15	6	6	7	10	894	**3rd**
2022	Toyota Gazoo Racing Australia 86 Series	TekworkX Motorsport	3	0	0	0	0	81	45th
2022	Porsche Sprint Challenge Australia	Earl Bamber Motorsport	15	6	8	11	14	833	**2nd**
2023	Super2 Series	Walkinshaw Andretti United	12	5	4	7	6	1296	**3rd**
2024	Supercars Championship	Walkinshaw Andretti United	24	0	0	1	0	1492	16th
2025	Supercars Championship	Walkinshaw Andretti United	34	1	3	1	7	3455	10th
2025	GT World Challenge Australia - Pro-Am	Wolfbrook Team MPC	12	0	0	0	5	123	4th
2026	Formula Regional Oceania Trophy	mtec Motorsport	15	2	1	3	4	276	5th
2026	Tasman Series	mtec Motorsport	15	2	1	3	4	276	**2nd**
2026	GT World Challenge Australia - Pro-Am	Wolfbrook Team BRM	10	0	0	3	4	95	6th

* Season still in progress

=== Super2 Series results ===
(key) (Race results only)

Super2 Series results
Year	Team	No.	Car	1	2	3	4	5	6	7	8	9	10	11	12	Position	Points
2023	Walkinshaw Andretti United	2	Holden Commodore ZB	NEW; R1; 8	**NEW**; **R2**; Ret	BAR; R3; 1	BAR; R4; 1	TOW; R5; 8	TOW; R6; 5	**SAN**; **R7**; 1	SAN; R8; 3	BAT; R9; Ret	BAT; R10; 4	**ADE**; **R11**; 1	**ADE**; **R12**; 1	3rd	1296

=== Supercars Championship results ===
Supercars results
Year	Team	No.	Car	1	2	3	4	5	6	7	8	9	10	11	12	13	14	15	16	17	18	19	20	21	22	23	24	25	26	27	28	29	30	31	32	33	34	35	36	37	Position	Points
2024	Walkinshaw Andretti United	2	Ford Mustang S650	BAT1; R1; Ret	BAT1; R2; Ret	MEL; R3; 19	MEL; R4; 12	MEL; R5; 10	MEL; R6; 21	TAU; R7; 4	TAU; R8; 11	BAR; R9; 4	BAR; R10; 8	HID; R11; 20	HID; R12; 24	TOW; R13; 17	TOW; R14; 6	SMP; R15; 13	SMP; R16; 16	SYM; R17; 11	SYM; R18; 8	SAN; R19; 15	BAT; R20; 15	SUR; R21; 22	SUR; R22; 21	ADE; R23; 10	ADE; R24; 19														16th	1492
2025	Walkinshaw Andretti United	2	Ford Mustang S650	SMP; R1; 11	SMP; R2; 20	SMP; R3; 14	MEL; R4; 5	MEL; R5; 22	MEL; R6; 6	MEL; R7; C	TAU; R8; 3	TAU; R9; 9	TAU; R10; 11	SYM; R11; 6	SYM; R12; 16	SYM; R13; 7	BAR; R14; 1	**BAR**; **R15**; **24**	BAR; R16; Ret	HID; R17; Ret	HID; R18; 9	HID; R19; 8	TOW; R20; 12	TOW; R21; 8	TOW; R22; 7	QLD; R23; 3	QLD; R24; 3	QLD; R25; 21	BEN; R26; 6	BAT; R27; 19	**SUR**; **R28**; **20**	SUR; R29; 9	**SAN**; **R30**; **3**	SAN; R31; 23	ADE; R32; 3	ADE; R33; 3	ADE; R34; 24				10th	3455
2026	Walkinshaw TWG Racing	2	Toyota GR Supra	SYD; R1; 21	SYD; R2; 7	SYD; R3; 5	MEL; R4; 7	MEL; R5; 3	MEL; R6; 18	MEL; R7; 21	TAU; R8; 3	**TAU**; **R9**; **1**	CHR; R10; 3	CHR; R11; 3	CHR; R12; 4	CHR; R13; Ret	SYM; R14; 14	SYM; R15; 8	SYM; R16; 8	HID; R17; 8	HID; R18; Ret	HID; R19; 7	TOW; R20; 8	TOW; R21; 26	TOW; R22; 5	BAR; R23; 2	BAR; R24; 8	BAR; R25; Ret	QLD; R26; 9	QLD; R27; 14	QLD; R28; 13	BEN; R28; 3	BAT; R30; 24	SUR; R31; 14	SUR; R32; 4	SAN; R33	SAN; R34	ADE; R35	ADE; R36	ADE; R37	9tħ*	1806*

=== Complete Bathurst 1000 results ===
Year	Team	Car	Co-driver	Position	Laps
2024	Walkinshaw Andretti United	Ford Mustang S650	(New Zealand) Fabian Coulthard	15th	161
2025	Walkinshaw Andretti United	Ford Mustang S650	(Australia) Jayden Ojeda	19th	149
2026	Walkinshaw TWG Racing	Toyota GR Supra	(New Zealand) Jaxon Evans	24th	145

=== Complete Bathurst 12 Hour results ===
Year	Team	Co-drivers	Car	Class	Laps	Pos.	Class pos.
2026	(United Kingdom) Ziggo Sport Tempesta by ARGT	(United Kingdom) Chris Froggatt (Hong Kong) Jonathan Hui (Italy) Lorenzo Patrese	Ferrari 296 GT3	**Bro**	262	10th	**3rd**

=== Complete GT World Challenge Australia results ===
(key) (Races in bold indicate pole position) (Races in italics indicate fastest lap)

Year	Team	Car	Class	1	2	3	4	5	6	7	8	9	10	11	12	Pos.	Points
2025	Melbourne Performance Centre	Audi R8 LMS Evo II	Pro-Am	PHI; 1; 11	PHI; 2; 6	SYD; 1; 6	SYD; 2; 2	QLD; 1	QLD; 2	SAN; 1; 2	SAN; 2; 6	BEN; 1; 4	BEN; 2; 2	HAM; 2; 3	HAM; 2; 2	4th	123
2026	Team BRM	Audi R8 LMS Evo II	Pro-Am	PHI; 1; 6	PHI; 2; 3	BEN; 1; 6	BEN; 2; 4	QLD; 1; 11	QLD; 2; 2	HID; 1; 10	HID; 2; 2	SYD; 1; 3	SYD; 2 Ret	ADL; 1	ADL; 2	6th	95

=== Complete Formula Regional Oceania Trophy results ===
(key) (Races in bold indicate pole position) (Races in italics indicate fastest lap)

Year	Team	1	2	3	4	5	6	7	8	9	10	11	12	13	14	15	16	DC	Points
2026	mtec Motorsport	HMP; 1; 4	HMP; 2; 4	HMP; 3; 18	HMP; 4 Ret	**TAU**; **1**; 1	TAU; 2; 5	TAU; 3; 3	TAU; 4; 1	TER; 1; 7	TER; 2; 2	TER; 3 C	TER; 4; 8	HIG; 1; 6	HIG; 2; 5	HIG; 3; 6	HIG; 4; 5	5th	276

=== Complete New Zealand Grand Prix results ===
Year	Team	Car	Qualifying	Main race
2026	(New Zealand) mtec Motorsport	Tatuus FT-60 - Toyota	7th	5th
