= Taupō Supercars round =

Motor racing event in New Zealand

(New Zealand) Taupō Super 440
- Race Information
Venue	Taupo International Motorsport Park
Number of times held	3
First held	2024
- Race Format
- Race 1
Laps	37
Distance	120 km
- Race 2
Laps	60
Distance	200 km
- Last Event (2026)
- Overall Winner
(New Zealand) Ryan Wood	Walkinshaw TWG Racing
- Race Winners
(Australia) Brodie Kostecki	Dick Johnson Racing
(New Zealand) Ryan Wood	Walkinshaw TWG Racing

The Taupō Super 440 is the current name for the annual motor racing event for Supercars, held at Taupo International Motorsport Park in Taupō, New Zealand since 2024.

== History ==
The Australian-based Supercars have held championship rounds in New Zealand since 2001, at Pukekohe Park Raceway (2001–07, 2013–19 and 2022) and Hamilton Street Circuit (2008–12). The Pukekohe circuit closed in early 2023, with the last Supercars event held in 2022. In August 2023, it was announced that the Supercars New Zealand round would move to Taupō in 2024, with an April date later confirmed.

At the inaugural event in 2024, Andre Heimgartner won the Saturday race in wet conditions, before Will Brown won the Sunday race. Anton de Pasquale however won the trophy, with two third place finishes across the weekend. In 2025, Matt Payne won the event and trophy with two wins in the revised three-race format over 440 kilometres. In 2026, Ryan Wood won Toyota's championship race win before the Sunday programme was cancelled altogether due to the potential impact of Cyclone Vaianu.

== Jason Richards Memorial Trophy ==
Until 2025, the driver who scored the most points across all races during the weekend received the Jason Richards Memorial Trophy. The trophy was originally introduced at the 2013 Auckland SuperSprint event in honour of Jason Richards, a one-time New Zealand Supercars race winner and Supercars Hall of Fame member who died of cancer in 2011, and continued to this event. From 2026, a second New Zealand event in Christchurch was added to the calendar, and the trophy is given to the driver that scores the most points over both rounds, to be held in consecutive weekends.

== Winners ==
Year	Driver	Team	Car	Report
2024	(Australia) Anton de Pasquale	Dick Johnson Racing	Ford Mustang S650	
2025	(New Zealand) Matthew Payne	Grove Racing	Ford Mustang S650	Report
2026	(New Zealand) Ryan Wood	Walkinshaw TWG Racing	Toyota GR Supra	Report

== Multiple winners ==
=== By manufacturer ===
Wins	Manufacturer
2	Ford
1	Toyota

== Event names and sponsors ==
- 2024: ITM Taupō Super400
- 2025–present: ITM Taupō Super 440

== See also ==
- List of Australian Touring Car Championship races
