= Enduro Cup =

- Awarded for: Most championship points across the Supercars endurance events.
- Country: Australia
- Reward: Trophy
- First award: 2013
- Currently held by: (Australia) Will Brown (Australia) Scott Pye

The Enduro Cup is an award given out to the highest points scorers over the endurance events in Supercars, currently The Bend 500 and the Bathurst 1000. The Cup was previously awarded from 2013 to 2019 before being relaunched in 2025.

== Background ==
From 1981 to 1986 and in 1990 and 1991, the Australian Endurance Championship was held for touring cars over several races per year, however unlike today was not a part of that year's Australian Touring Car Championship. As per the Enduro Cup, the Sandown 500 and Bathurst 1000 regularly featured as championship rounds, and some years also had an event on the Gold Coast, at Surfers Paradise International Raceway. Allan Moffat and Jim Richards were the only two-time championship winners in this era.

The Enduro Cup was launched in 2013 as a way to link together the series' three two-driver endurance events. These races are Australia's traditional two endurance races, the Sandown 500 and Bathurst 1000, and the Gold Coast 600, which switched to a two-driver, two-race endurance format in 2010. From 2010 to 2012, the Gold Coast 600 required teams to use an international driver to accompany the local series regulars. In 2013, this requirement was dropped and teams could now pick the same driver for all three events. To accompany this, the Enduro Cup was introduced, as a championship within a championship. The award was sponsored from 2013 to 2019 by Pirtek, who had previously sponsored the successful Stone Brothers Racing as a title sponsor from 1998 to 2005. A collection of Pirtek hose fittings were used to create the trophy awarded to the winners.

== History ==
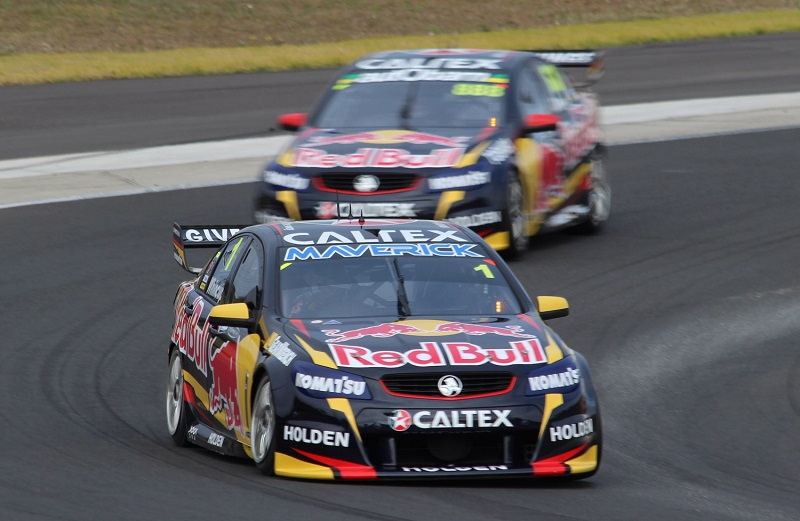
Triple Eight Race Engineering, pictured in 2014, have won five Enduro Cups.

In 2013, Craig Lowndes and Warren Luff won the Enduro Cup, despite winning only the first race of the Gold Coast 600. In 2014, Jamie Whincup and Paul Dumbrell won the Enduro Cup, again for Triple Eight Race Engineering, winning both the Sandown 500 and the second race on the Gold Coast in the process. In 2015, Luff became the first driver to win the Enduro Cup on more than one occasion, this time driving with Garth Tander for the Holden Racing Team. Tander and Luff did not win any of the four races in the endurance season, with consistent results of two third and two fourth places instead accumulating enough points to win the trophy. In 2016, the all-international pairing of Shane van Gisbergen and Alexandre Prémat won the trophy, with three second-place finishes and one win amounting to the most dominant performance in the Enduro Cup era. In 2017, Chaz Mostert and Steve Owen won the first Enduro Cup for Ford, with one win at the Gold Coast 600.

The 2018 winners were Craig Lowndes, who joined his 2013 co-driver Luff as a two-time winner, and Steven Richards driving a Holden Commodore ZB for Triple Eight Race Engineering. Lowndes and Richards became the first winners of the Enduro Cup to have also won the Bathurst 1000 in the same year, while in the second Gold Coast 600 race they were under investigation for two separate infringements, prior to the race being abandoned due to bad weather. Lowndes retired from full-time Supercars competition after 2018, but went on to win the Enduro Cup again in 2019 as co-driver to Jamie Whincup. The 2019 series also featured the first shift in the endurance calendar since the cup's inception with the Sandown 500 moving from the first to the last of the three endurance events. The qualifying races at Sandown also became points-paying races, contributing to the Enduro Cup results.

=== Demise ===
The Sandown 500 was scheduled to drop out of the Enduro Cup in 2020, to be replaced by The Bend 500 at The Bend Motorsport Park. In a reshuffled calendar due to the COVID-19 pandemic, both the Gold Coast 600 and The Bend 500 were cancelled and the 2020 Bathurst 1000 was the only endurance event held. No Enduro Cup was awarded for this single event, and the 2021 Supercars Championship was again scheduled to contain only one endurance event, without an Enduro Cup.

=== Revival ===
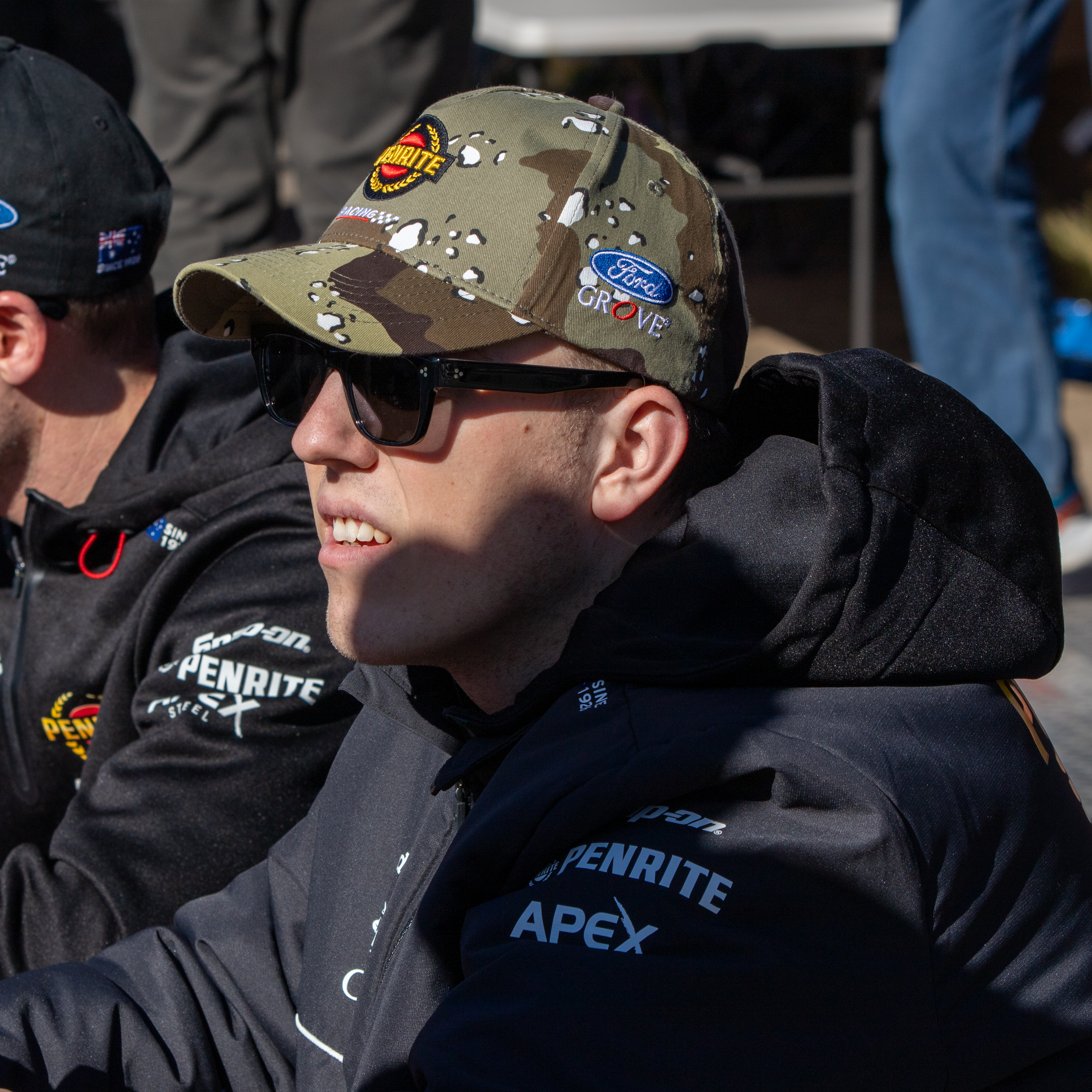
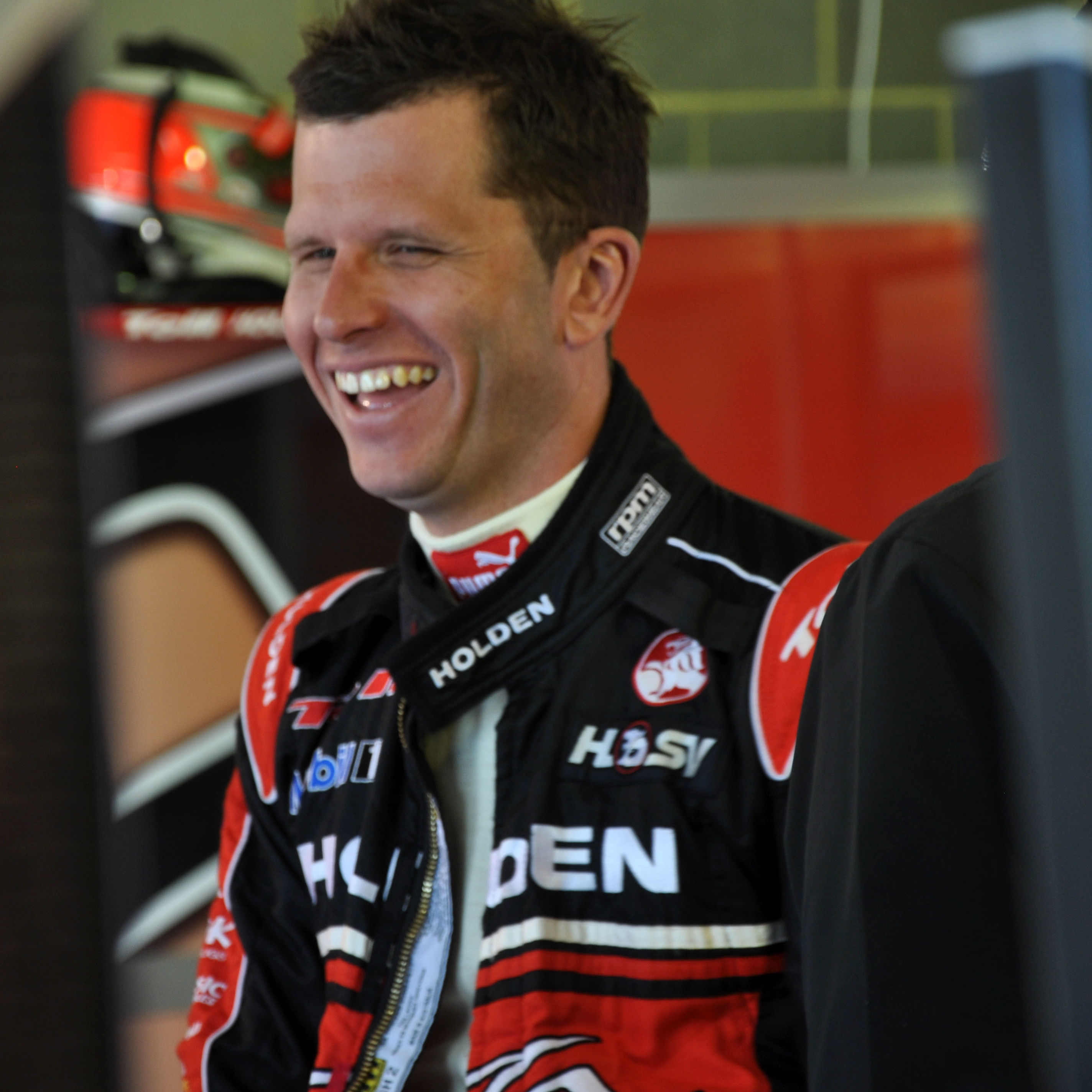
Matt Payne (left) and Garth Tander (right) won the Enduro Cup together following the return of the award in 2025.

After being discontinued in 2020, a series of championship format changes saw the Enduro Cup return for the 2025 season. This format change saw the championship being split into three categories, with the winner of the award being given automatic entry into the Final Series alongside 25 bonus points for the Round of 10. (Note: Only the primary driver is given automatic entry.) This format change also saw the removal of the Gold Coast 500 and Sandown 500 from the Enduro Cup, as they became the host of the first and second Finals Series events, respectively. Both were replaced by The Bend 500.

== Points system ==
=== 2013–18 ===
Prior to the revival of the Enduro Cup, points were given down to 30th for a maximum of 300 points per event. Additionally, both drivers earnt the total points awarded to the finishing position of the car. The Gold Coast 600 was a two-race event and with the 300 points for an event win divided across both two races, each winner received 150 points.

Event	Position, points per race																									
Event	1st	2nd	3rd	4th	5th	6th	7th	8th	9th	10th	11th	12th	13th	14th	15th	16th	17th	18th	19th	20th	21st	22nd	23rd	24th	25th	26th
Sandown and Bathurst	300	276	258	240	222	204	192	180	168	156	144	138	132	126	120	114	108	102	96	90	84	78	72	66	60	54
Gold Coast	150	138	129	120	111	102	96	90	84	78	72	69	66	63	60	57	54	51	48	45	42	39	36	33	30	27

=== 2019 ===
The 2019 season saw the addition of two more races at Sandown, with each race getting progressively longer. As a result, a win at the Sandown 500 was worth less points.

Event	Position, points per race																									
Event	1st	2nd	3rd	4th	5th	6th	7th	8th	9th	10th	11th	12th	13th	14th	15th	16th	17th	18th	19th	20th	21st	22nd	23rd	24th	25th	26th
Bathurst	300	276	258	240	222	204	192	180	168	156	144	138	132	126	120	114	108	102	96	90	84	78	72	66	60	54
Sandown 500	250	230	215	200	185	170	160	150	140	130	120	115	110	105	100	95	90	85	80	75	70	65	60	55	50	
Gold Coast	150	138	129	120	111	102	96	90	84	78	72	69	66	63	60	57	54	51	48	45	42	39	36	33	30	27
Sandown (long)	100	92	86	80	74	68	64	60	56	52	48	46	44	42	40	38	36	34	32	30	28	26	24	22		
Sandown (short)	50	46	43	40	37	34	32	30	28	26	24	23	22	21	20	19	18	17	16	15	14	13	12	11	10	

=== 2025–present ===
Points are awarded as follows at the Enduro Cup events. Both events are worth 300 points for a win.

Position, points per race
1st	2nd	3rd	4th	5th	6th	7th	8th	9th	10th	11th	12th	13th	14th	15th	16th	17th	18th	19th	20th	21st	22nd	23rd	24th	25th
300	276	258	240	222	204	192	180	168	156	144	138	132	126	120	114	108	102	96	90	84	78	72	66	60

== Winners ==
Year	Drivers	Team	Car
2013	(Australia) Craig Lowndes (Australia) Warren Luff	Triple Eight Race Engineering	Holden Commodore VF
2014	(Australia) Jamie Whincup (Australia) Paul Dumbrell	Triple Eight Race Engineering	Holden Commodore VF
2015	(Australia) Garth Tander (Australia) Warren Luff	Holden Racing Team	Holden Commodore VF
2016	(New Zealand) Shane van Gisbergen (France) Alexandre Prémat	Triple Eight Race Engineering	Holden Commodore VF
2017	(Australia) Chaz Mostert (Australia) Steve Owen	Rod Nash Racing	Ford Falcon FG X
2018	(Australia) Craig Lowndes (New Zealand) Steven Richards	Triple Eight Race Engineering	Holden Commodore ZB
2019	(Australia) Jamie Whincup (Australia) Craig Lowndes	Triple Eight Race Engineering	Holden Commodore ZB
2020 – 2024	not held		
2025	(New Zealand) Matthew Payne (Australia) Garth Tander	Grove Racing	Ford Mustang GT
2026	(Australia) Will Brown (Australia) Scott Pye	Triple Eight Race Engineering	Ford Mustang GT

== Multiple winners ==
=== By driver ===
Wins	Driver	Years
3	(Australia) Craig Lowndes	2013, 2018, 2019
2	(Australia) Warren Luff	2013, 2015
2	(Australia) Jamie Whincup	2014, 2019
2	(Australia) Garth Tander	2015, 2025

=== By team ===
Wins	Team
6	Triple Eight Race Engineering

=== By manufacturer ===
Wins	Manufacturer
6	Holden
3	Ford
