= The Bend SuperSprint =

Australian annual motor racing event

(South Australia) The Bend SuperSprint
- Race Information
Venue	The Bend Motorsport Park
Number of times held	7
First held	2018
Last held	2023
- Race Format
- Race 1
Laps	20
Distance	100 km
- Race 2
Laps	20
Distance	100 km
- Race 3
Laps	20
Distance	100 km
- Last Event (2023)
- Overall Winner
(Australia) Brodie Kostecki	Erebus Motorsport
- Race Winners
(Australia) Brodie Kostecki	Erebus Motorsport
(Australia) Brodie Kostecki	Erebus Motorsport
(Australia) Brodie Kostecki	Erebus Motorsport

The Bend SuperSprint (known for sponsorship reasons as the OTR SuperSprint – The Bend) was an annual motor racing event for Supercars, held at The Bend Motorsport Park in Tailem Bend, South Australia from 2018 until 2023. In 2023, it was announced that The Bend 500 endurance race, originally planned for 2020, would replace the event from 2025, with no event held in 2024.

== Format ==
The event was held over two days, from Saturday to Sunday. On Saturday, two thirty-minute practice sessions, then a three-part knock-out qualifying session were held, for the 100 kilometre race to follow. Sunday features two fifteen-minute qualifying sessions that set the grid for each of the day's two 100 km races.

== History ==
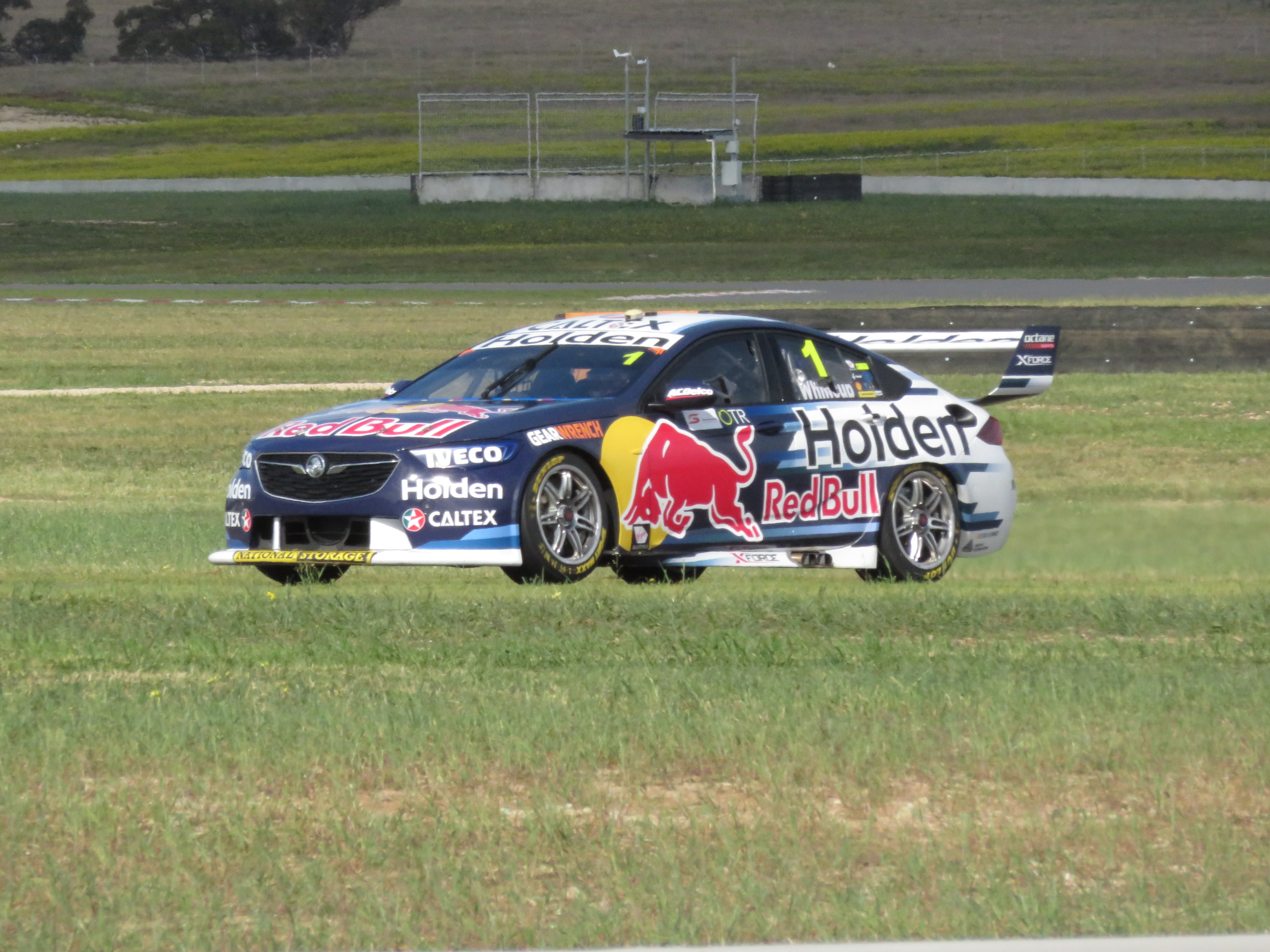
Jamie Whincup at the 2018 event.

The Bend Motorsport Park, the first permanent circuit to be opened in Australia since Queensland Raceway in 1999, signed a memorandum of understanding to host a future Supercars race early in the construction process in 2015. Following final approval from the Government of South Australia, the circuit was added to the 2018 calendar with an August date, the first time the state has held two championship events in a season since Adelaide International Raceway hosted two rounds in 1977. The inaugural event was dominated by Triple Eight Race Engineering, with two poles and two race victories shared between Shane van Gisbergen and Jamie Whincup. The 2019 event was again dominated by a single team, with DJR Team Penske's Scott McLaughlin winning both races from pole position.

From 2020, the sprint event was due to be replaced on the championship calendar by a new endurance race at the circuit. The endurance event was then dropped in a shortened calendar due to the COVID-19 pandemic. In a further revision to the calendar, caused by border restrictions, a double-header SuperSprint was added to the calendar to be held in September 2020 on consecutive weekends. In the first of the two events the wins were again shared between Triple Eight and DJR Team Penske, with championship combatants McLaughlin and Whincup clashing in the first race of the weekend, resulting in a penalty for Whincup. Fabian Coulthard won the round.

The west circuit layout, in which used for the second race in 2020

Other than the second 2020 event, all events have run on the 4.950 km (3.076 mi) "International" configuration of the circuit. The second 2020 event used the shorter 3.410 km (2.119 mi) "West" layout. The event was also open to "wildcard" entries, allowing teams and drivers from the Super2 Series support category to take part in the top tier. McLaughlin winning the second round, and in doing so securing his third consecutive Supercars Championship. In 2021, the event was the only South Australian event following the demise of the Adelaide 500 (the event later returned in 2022). Ford won all three races over the weekend, including Andre Heimgartner's first career win, however Shane van Gisbergen won the round in Holden's final scheduled year in the championship. In 2022, Zak Best, entered as a wildcard, took a pole position for the first race. At the event's final running to date in 2023, Brodie Kostecki won all three races as part of his championship-winning campaign.

== Winners ==
Year	Driver	Team	Car	Report
2018	(New Zealand) Shane van Gisbergen	Triple Eight Race Engineering	Holden ZB Commodore	Report
2019	(New Zealand) Scott McLaughlin	DJR Team Penske	Ford Mustang GT	
2020^{1}	(New Zealand) Fabian Coulthard	DJR Team Penske	Ford Mustang GT	
2020^{1}	(New Zealand) Scott McLaughlin	DJR Team Penske	Ford Mustang GT	
2021	(New Zealand) Shane van Gisbergen	Triple Eight Race Engineering	Holden ZB Commodore	
2022	(New Zealand) Shane van Gisbergen	Triple Eight Race Engineering	Holden ZB Commodore	
2023	(Australia) Brodie Kostecki	Erebus Motorsport	Chevrolet Camaro ZL1-1LE	

Notes

- ^1 – The Bend Motorsport Park hosted two events of the 2020 Supercars Championship. The second event was the only event to date to use the circuit's West layout. All other events have used the International layout.

== Multiple winners ==
=== By driver ===
Wins	Driver	Years
3	(New Zealand) Shane van Gisbergen	2018, 2021, 2022
2	(New Zealand) Scott McLaughlin	2019, 2020-2

=== By team ===
Wins	Team
3	DJR Team Penske
3	Triple Eight Race Engineering

=== By manufacturer ===
Wins	Manufacturer
3	Ford
3	Holden

== Event names and sponsors ==
- 2018–23: OTR SuperSprint – The Bend
- 2020^{1}: Repco SuperSprint – The Bend

== See also ==
- List of Australian Touring Car Championship races
- The Bend 500
