= The Bend 500 =

Endurance motor racing event for Supercars

(South Australia) The Bend 500
- Race Information
Venue	The Bend Motorsport Park
Number of times held	2
First held	2025
- Race Format
- Race 1
Laps	147
Distance	500 km
- Last Event (2026)
- Overall Winner
(Australia) Chaz Mostert (New Zealand) Fabian Coulthard	Walkinshaw TWG Racing
- Race Winners

The Bend 500, also known as The Bend Enduro, is an annual motor racing event for Supercars, held at The Bend Motorsport Park in Tailem Bend, South Australia since 2025.

== Format ==
The event was run over three days, with five practice sessions over Friday and Saturday. Qualifying was held on Saturday, followed by a Top 10 Shootout. After a final warm-up in Sunday morning, a 500 kilometre race was then held on Sunday afternoon. The event is also part of the relaunched Enduro Cup with the Bathurst 1000 from 2025.

== History ==
The international circuit layout used prior to 2025.

The Bend Motorsport Park opened in 2018 and hosted The Bend SuperSprint for two years before being announced as the host of an endurance race as part of the 2020 Supercars Championship, replacing the Sandown 500 as the series' annual 500 kilometre race. In June 2020, the event was removed from the second revision of the 2020 calendar, caused by the COVID-19 pandemic, however a double-header sprint event at The Bend was then added to the calendar in a further calendar shuffle in August 2020. The event was again excluded from the 2021 Supercars Championship calendar, and it was not until 2023 that the event was announced to return - albeit not until the 2025 season, with The Bend remaining as a sprint event up to and including 2023.

The inaugural event, held in September 2025, was won by Brodie Kostecki and Todd Hazelwood for Dick Johnson Racing. The win was the second consecutive endurance race win for the pair, having won the 2024 Bathurst 1000 driving for Erebus Motorsport.

On 21 January 2026, organizers announced that West Circuit layout would be used for this year's race instead of regularly used International Circuit layout in order to increase overtaking possibilities, viewing of spectators and offer more different strategies.

== List of winners ==
Year	Event name	Layout	Driver(s)	Team	Car	Laps Elapsed time
2025	AirTouch 500 at The Bend	International Circuit	(Australia) Brodie Kostecki (Australia) Todd Hazelwood	Dick Johnson Racing	Ford Mustang GT	102 laps 3h 15m 50.1972s
2026	AirTouch 500 at The Bend	West Circuit	(Australia) Chaz Mostert (New Zealand) Fabian Coulthard	Walkinshaw TWG Racing	Toyota GR Supra	141 laps 3h 36m 02.669s

== Multiple winners ==
=== By driver ===
Wins	Driver	Years
1	(New Zealand) Fabian Coulthard	2026
1	(Australia) Todd Hazelwood	2025
1	(Australia) Brodie Kostecki	2025
1	(Australia) Chaz Mostert	2026

=== By team ===
Wins	Team
1	Dick Johnson Racing
1	Walkinshaw TWG Racing

=== By manufacturer ===
Wins	Manufacturer
1	Ford
1	Toyota

== See also ==
- The Bend SuperSprint
- List of Australian Touring Car Championship races
