= 2025 Supercars Championship =

Motor racing competition

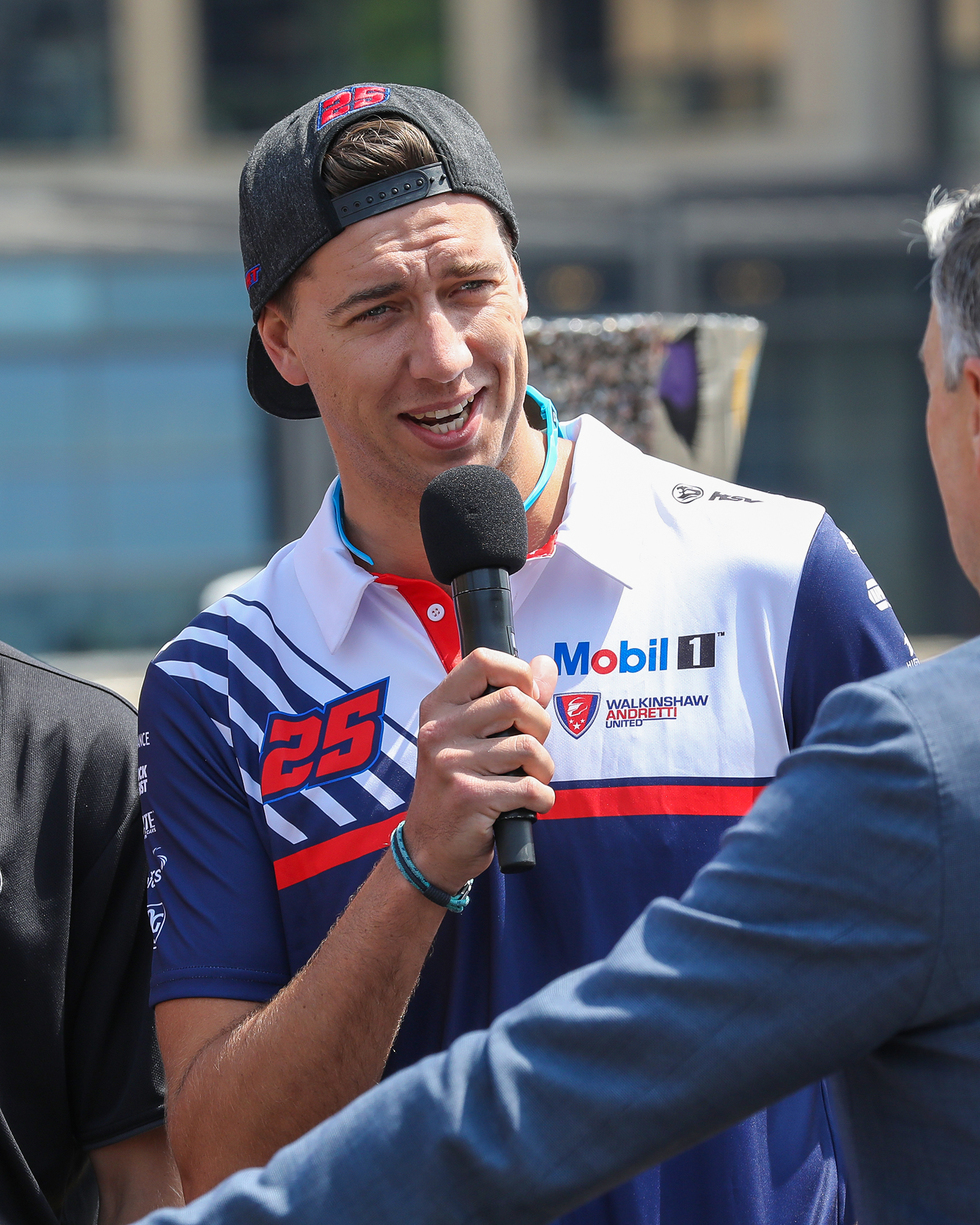
Chaz Mostert won his first drivers' championship

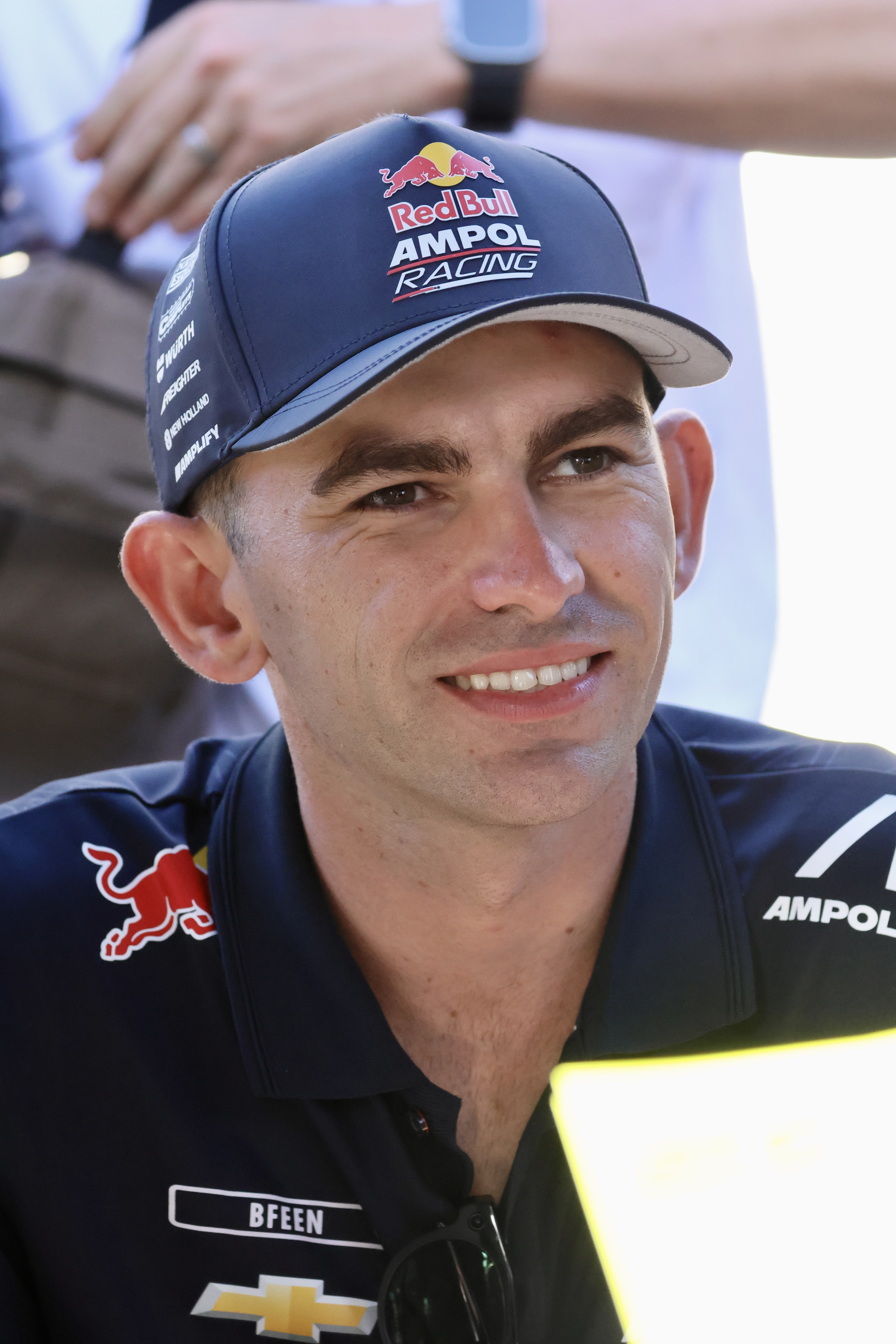
Broc Feeney became the inaugural Sprint Cup Champion after winning the first race at the Ipswich Super 440.

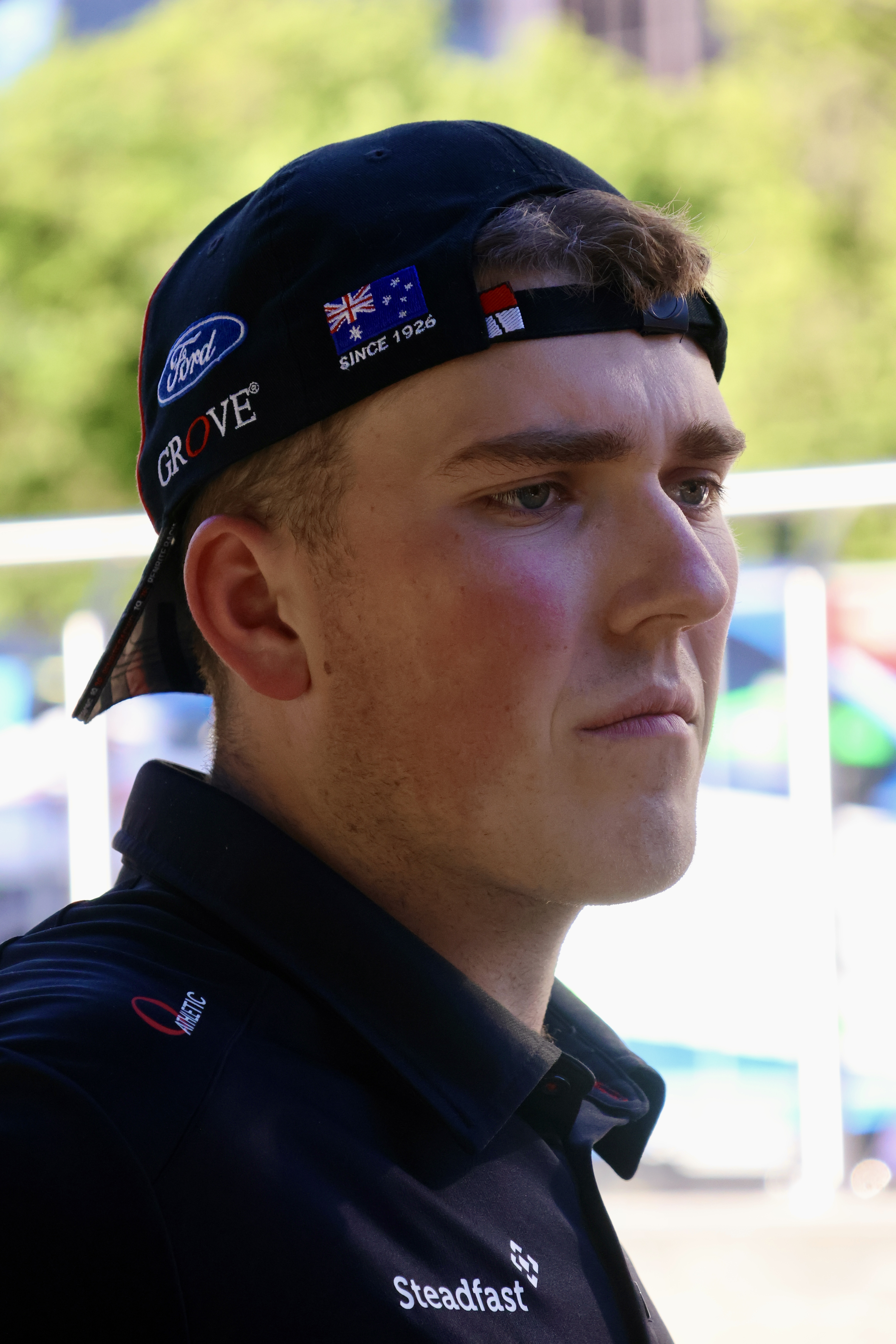
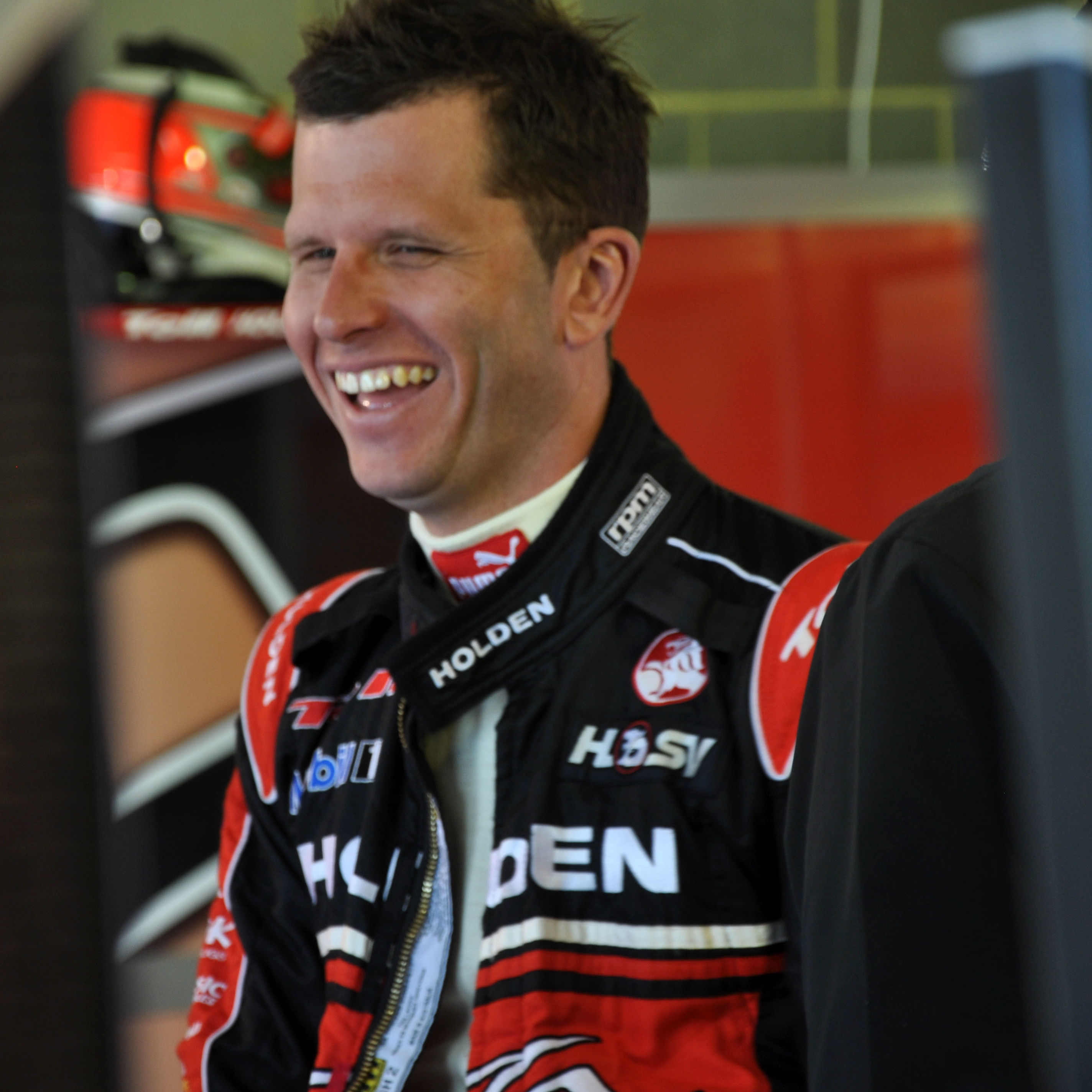
Matt Payne and Garth Tander won the Enduro Cup after winning the Bathurst 1000.

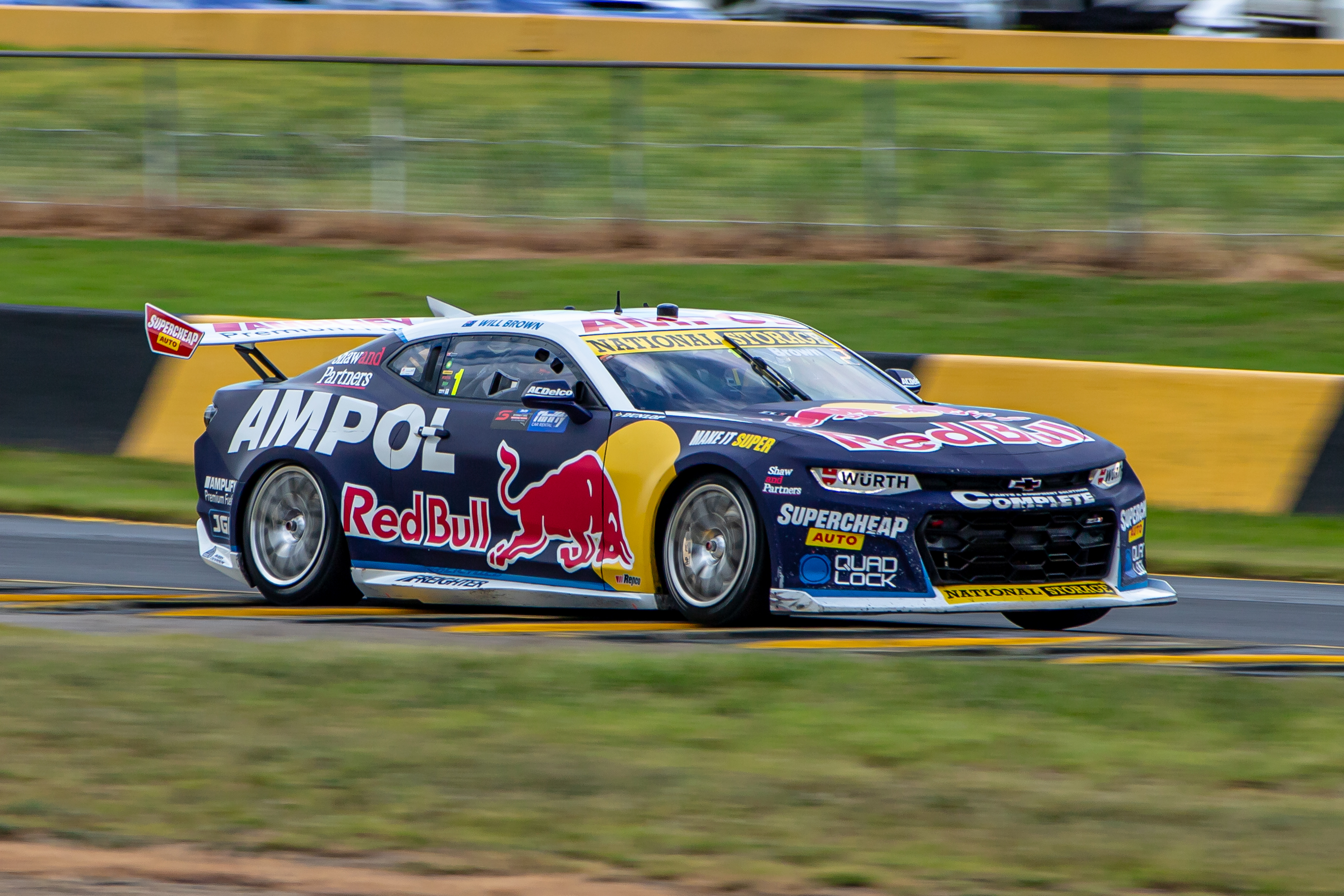
Triple Eight Race Engineering won the Teams' Championship.

The 2025 Supercars Championship (known for commercial reasons as the 2025 Repco Supercars Championship) was a motor racing series for Supercars. It was the 27th running of the Supercars Championship and the 29th series in which Supercars have contested the Australian Touring Car Championship, the premier title in Australian motorsport. It was the sixty-sixth season of touring car racing in Australia.

Will Brown and Triple Eight Race Engineering entered the championship as defending Drivers' and Teams' Champions respectively.

The 2025 season marked the first year in which the Finals Series was implemented, segmenting the season into three sections. Broc Feeney secured the inaugural Sprint Cup Championship at the first race of the Ipswich Super440. Matt Payne and Garth Tander won the 8th edition of the Enduro Cup following a win at Bathurst. Triple Eight clinched the Team's Championship for the record-breaking thirteenth season after the first race of the Sandown 500. Chaz Mostert won the Finals Series, in doing so securing his first ever Drivers' Championship.

== Teams and drivers ==
The following teams and drivers competed in the 2025 championship.

Championship entries						Endurance entries	
Manufacturer	Model	Team	No.	Driver name	Rounds	Co-driver name	Rounds
Chevrolet	Camaro ZL1	Triple Eight Race Engineering	1	(Australia) Will Brown	All	(Australia) Scott Pye	9–10
Chevrolet	Camaro ZL1	Triple Eight Race Engineering	88	(Australia) Broc Feeney	All	(Australia) Jamie Whincup	9–10
Chevrolet	Camaro ZL1	Matt Stone Racing	4	(Australia) Cameron Hill	All	(Australia) Cameron McLeod	9–10
Chevrolet	Camaro ZL1	Matt Stone Racing	10	(Australia) Nick Percat	All	(Australia) Tim Slade	9–10
Chevrolet	Camaro ZL1	Brad Jones Racing	8	(New Zealand) Andre Heimgartner	All	(Australia) Declan Fraser	9–10
Chevrolet	Camaro ZL1	Brad Jones Racing	12	(New Zealand) Jaxon Evans	All	(Australia) Jack Smith	9–10
Chevrolet	Camaro ZL1	Brad Jones Racing	14	(Australia) Bryce Fullwood	All	(Australia) Brad Vaughan	9–10
Chevrolet	Camaro ZL1	Brad Jones Racing	96	(Australia) Macauley Jones	All	(Australia) Jordan Boys	9–10
Chevrolet	Camaro ZL1	Erebus Motorsport	9	(Australia) Jack Le Brocq	All	(Australia) Jarrod Hughes	9–10
Chevrolet	Camaro ZL1	Erebus Motorsport	99	(Australia) Cooper Murray	All	(Australia) Jobe Stewart	9–10
Chevrolet	Camaro ZL1	Team 18	18	(Australia) Anton de Pasquale	All	(Australia) Harri Jones	9–10
Chevrolet	Camaro ZL1	Team 18	20	(Australia) David Reynolds	All	(Australia) Lee Holdsworth	9–10
Chevrolet	Camaro ZL1	PremiAir Racing	31	(Australia) James Golding	All	(Australia) David Russell	9–10
Chevrolet	Camaro ZL1	PremiAir Racing	62	(New Zealand) Richie Stanaway	1–11	(Australia) Nash Morris	9–10
Chevrolet	Camaro ZL1	PremiAir Racing	62	(Australia) Jayden Ojeda	12–13	—N/a	
Ford	Mustang S650	Walkinshaw Andretti United	2	(New Zealand) Ryan Wood	All	(Australia) Jayden Ojeda	9–10
Ford	Mustang S650	Walkinshaw Andretti United	25	(Australia) Chaz Mostert	All	(New Zealand) Fabian Coulthard	9–10
Ford	Mustang S650	Blanchard Racing Team	3	(Australia) Aaron Love	1	—N/a	
Ford	Mustang S650	Blanchard Racing Team	3	(Australia) Aaron Cameron	2–13	(Australia) Zak Best	9–10
Ford	Mustang S650	Blanchard Racing Team	7	(Australia) James Courtney	All	(Australia) Jack Perkins	9–10
Ford	Mustang S650	Tickford Racing	6	(Australia) Cam Waters	All	(Australia) Mark Winterbottom	9–10
Ford	Mustang S650	Tickford Racing	55	(Australia) Thomas Randle	All	(Australia) James Moffat	9–10
Ford	Mustang S650	Dick Johnson Racing	17	(Australia) Will Davison	All	(Australia) Tony D'Alberto	9–10
Ford	Mustang S650	Dick Johnson Racing	38	(Australia) Brodie Kostecki	All	(Australia) Todd Hazelwood	9–10
Ford	Mustang S650	Grove Racing	19	(New Zealand) Matt Payne	All	(Australia) Garth Tander	9–10
Ford	Mustang S650	Grove Racing	26	(Australia) Kai Allen	All	(Australia) Dale Wood	9–10
Wildcard entries
Chevrolet	Camaro ZL1	Matt Stone Racing	35	(Australia) Cameron Crick	1, 8–10	(Australia) Aaron Seton	9–10
Chevrolet	Camaro ZL1	Triple Eight Race Engineering	888	(Australia) Zach Bates	8–10	(Australia) Craig Lowndes	9–10
Ford	Mustang S650	Tickford Racing	5	(Australia) Lochie Dalton	5, 9–10	(Australia) Rylan Gray	9–10
Ford	Mustang S650	Tickford Racing	5	(Australia) Rylan Gray	6	—N/a	
Ford	Mustang S650	Tickford Racing	5	(United States) Austin Cindric	13	—N/a	

=== Driver changes ===
Tim Slade retired from full time competition. He joined Matt Stone Racing for the Enduro Cup, and was replaced at PremiAir Racing by Richie Stanaway. 2023 Super2 Series winner Kai Allen graduated to replace Stanaway at Grove Racing.

Mark Winterbottom departed Team 18 and joined Tickford Racing for the Enduro Cup.

Anton de Pasquale departed Dick Johnson Racing to replace Winterbottom at Team 18.

Brodie Kostecki left Erebus Motorsport and replaced De Pasquale at Dick Johnson Racing.

Super2 Series graduate Cooper Murray replaced Kostecki at Erebus.

=== Mid-season changes ===
Aaron Love left Blanchard Racing Team after the Sydney SuperSprint. He was replaced by Aaron Cameron.

Richie Stanaway left PremiAir Racing after the Gold Coast 500. He was replaced by Jayden Ojeda.

=== Wildcard entries ===
Triple Eight Race Engineering's wildcard program continued, with Zach Bates entered at Ipswich before joining forces with Craig Lowndes for Tailem Bend and Bathurst.

Tickford Racing would again enter a wildcard for Lochie Dalton at the Perth Super 440 and Rylan Gray at the Darwin Triple Crown. Dalton and Gray would then partner each other for the endurance events. NASCAR Cup Series driver Austin Cindric would also join the team in a third car at the Adelaide Grand Final.

Matt Stone Racing entered a third car for Cameron Crick at Sydney and Ipswich before he partnered Aaron Seton for the endurance events.

== Calendar ==
The following circuits are due to host a round of the 2025 championship.

Round	Race	Event	Circuit	Location	Dates	Maps
Sprint Cup						Maps
1	1	Sydney 500	(New South Wales) Sydney Motorsport Park	Eastern Creek, New South Wales	21–23 February	2025 Supercars Championship is located in Australia
1	2	Sydney 500	(New South Wales) Sydney Motorsport Park	Eastern Creek, New South Wales	21–23 February	2025 Supercars Championship is located in Australia
1	3	Sydney 500	(New South Wales) Sydney Motorsport Park	Eastern Creek, New South Wales	21–23 February	2025 Supercars Championship is located in Australia
2	4	Melbourne SuperSprint	(Victoria (state)) Albert Park Circuit	Albert Park, Victoria	13–16 March	2025 Supercars Championship is located in Australia
2	5	Melbourne SuperSprint	(Victoria (state)) Albert Park Circuit	Albert Park, Victoria	13–16 March	2025 Supercars Championship is located in Australia
2	6	Melbourne SuperSprint	(Victoria (state)) Albert Park Circuit	Albert Park, Victoria	13–16 March	2025 Supercars Championship is located in Australia
2	7	Melbourne SuperSprint	(Victoria (state)) Albert Park Circuit	Albert Park, Victoria	13–16 March	2025 Supercars Championship is located in Australia
3	8	Taupō Super 440	(New Zealand) Taupō International Motorsport Park	Taupō, Waikato Region	11–13 April	2025 Supercars Championship is located in Australia
3	9	Taupō Super 440	(New Zealand) Taupō International Motorsport Park	Taupō, Waikato Region	11–13 April	2025 Supercars Championship is located in Australia
3	10	Taupō Super 440	(New Zealand) Taupō International Motorsport Park	Taupō, Waikato Region	11–13 April	2025 Supercars Championship is located in Australia
4	11	Tasmania Super 440	(Tasmania) Symmons Plains Raceway	Launceston, Tasmania	9–11 May	2025 Supercars Championship is located in Australia
4	12	Tasmania Super 440	(Tasmania) Symmons Plains Raceway	Launceston, Tasmania	9–11 May	2025 Supercars Championship is located in Australia
4	13	Tasmania Super 440	(Tasmania) Symmons Plains Raceway	Launceston, Tasmania	9–11 May	2025 Supercars Championship is located in Australia
5	14	Perth Super 440	(Western Australia) Wanneroo Raceway	Neerabup, Western Australia	6–8 June	2025 Supercars Championship is located in Australia
5	15	Perth Super 440	(Western Australia) Wanneroo Raceway	Neerabup, Western Australia	6–8 June	2025 Supercars Championship is located in Australia
5	16	Perth Super 440	(Western Australia) Wanneroo Raceway	Neerabup, Western Australia	6–8 June	2025 Supercars Championship is located in Australia
6	17	Darwin Triple Crown	(Northern Territory) Hidden Valley Raceway	Darwin, Northern Territory	20–22 June	2025 Supercars Championship is located in Australia
6	18	Darwin Triple Crown	(Northern Territory) Hidden Valley Raceway	Darwin, Northern Territory	20–22 June	2025 Supercars Championship is located in Australia
6	19	Darwin Triple Crown	(Northern Territory) Hidden Valley Raceway	Darwin, Northern Territory	20–22 June	2025 Supercars Championship is located in New Zealand
7	20	Townsville 500	(Queensland) Reid Park Street Circuit	Townsville, Queensland	11–13 July	2025 Supercars Championship is located in New Zealand
7	21	Townsville 500	(Queensland) Reid Park Street Circuit	Townsville, Queensland	11–13 July	2025 Supercars Championship is located in New Zealand
7	22	Townsville 500	(Queensland) Reid Park Street Circuit	Townsville, Queensland	11–13 July	2025 Supercars Championship is located in New Zealand
8	23	Ipswich Super 440	Queensland Raceway	Ipswich, Queensland	8–10 August	2025 Supercars Championship is located in New Zealand
8	24	Ipswich Super 440	Queensland Raceway	Ipswich, Queensland	8–10 August	2025 Supercars Championship is located in New Zealand
8	25	Ipswich Super 440	Queensland Raceway	Ipswich, Queensland	8–10 August	2025 Supercars Championship is located in New Zealand
Enduro Cup						2025 Supercars Championship is located in New Zealand
9	26	The Bend 500	(South Australia) The Bend Motorsport Park	Tailem Bend, South Australia	12–14 September	2025 Supercars Championship is located in New Zealand
10	27	Bathurst 1000	(New South Wales) Mount Panorama Circuit	Bathurst, New South Wales	9–12 October	2025 Supercars Championship is located in New Zealand
Finals Series						2025 Supercars Championship is located in New Zealand
11	28	Gold Coast 500	(Queensland) Surfers Paradise Street Circuit	Surfers Paradise, Queensland	24–26 October	2025 Supercars Championship is located in New Zealand
11	29	Gold Coast 500	(Queensland) Surfers Paradise Street Circuit	Surfers Paradise, Queensland	24–26 October	2025 Supercars Championship is located in New Zealand
12	30	Sandown 500	(Victoria (state)) Sandown Raceway	Springvale, Victoria	14–16 November	2025 Supercars Championship is located in New Zealand
12	31	Sandown 500	(Victoria (state)) Sandown Raceway	Springvale, Victoria	14–16 November	2025 Supercars Championship is located in New Zealand
13	32	Adelaide Grand Final	(South Australia) Adelaide Street Circuit	Adelaide, South Australia	27–30 November	2025 Supercars Championship is located in New Zealand
13	33	Adelaide Grand Final	(South Australia) Adelaide Street Circuit	Adelaide, South Australia	27–30 November	2025 Supercars Championship is located in New Zealand
13	34	Adelaide Grand Final	(South Australia) Adelaide Street Circuit	Adelaide, South Australia	27–30 November	2025 Supercars Championship is located in New Zealand

=== Calendar changes ===
The Bend Motorsport Park returned to the calendar, after missing out on the 2024 championship, as the first round of the Enduro Cup.

Queensland Raceway returned to the championship for the first time since 2019.

Sydney SuperNight moved from July to February, replacing the Bathurst 500.

== Rule changes ==
=== Format changes ===
For 2025, the series was split into three categories, with each awarding its own title.

- The "Sprint Cup" was contested during first eight rounds. Two events—Sydney and Townsville—featured a 100 km Sprint Race on Friday and two 200km Feature Races on Saturday and Sunday with refuelling. One event—the Melbourne SuperSprint—featured four races of roughly 100 km. The remaining five will feature two 120km Sprint Races on Saturday and one 200 km Feature Race with refuelling on Sunday.
- The "Enduro Cup" returned for the first time since 2019, made up of The Bend 500 and the Bathurst 1000.
- The final three events contested a "Finals Series", similar to the NASCAR playoffs and Turismo Carretera Gold Cup.

Whilst the "Sprint Cup" and "Enduro Cup" will follow a traditional first-past-the-post championship system, the "Finals Series" will employ a combination of first-past-the-post and knockout elimination formats.

- 10 drivers took part in the first Finals Series round at the Gold Coast, held over two races of 250 km. These ten drivers consisted of the two Sprint and Enduro Cup Champions, with the remaining spots filled by the highest-placed drivers in the overall championship to that point. Drivers' points were reset to 3000, with bonus points awarded based on existing championship position (150-120-96-78-66-57-48-39-30-21). The Sprint and Enduro Cup Champions also received a bonus 25 points per title.
- The top 7 drivers with the most points following the Gold Coast round will then take part in the second Finals Series round at Sandown, held over two races of 250 km. Points are reset to 4000 with the same bonus points scale.
- The top 4 drivers will then take part in the last Finals round at Adelaide. This round is held over three races—one Sprint Race of 100 km on Friday, followed by two Feature Races of 250 km on Saturday and Sunday. Drivers' points reset to 5000 with bonus points now awarded on a sliding scale of 50-30-15-0. The driver with the most points after the three races in Adelaide will be crowned series' champion.

If a driver eligible for Finals points wins a race at the Gold Coast or Sandown, they automatically advance through to the next round. Drivers who do not qualify for the Finals in any form will continue to compete for points in the overall standings, as will drivers who are knocked out in the first two rounds of the Finals. Teams' Championship points are determined by their driver's regular season points.

=== Technical changes ===
A new series of tyre compounds were introduced for the 2025 season. Instead of soft, medium and hard compounds, there were only two different dry-weather tyres, soft and super soft, with the former being revamped. Fuel towers were replaced with fuel churns for the Sprint Cup rounds. Additionally, co-drivers are now required to contest at least 37% of distance for Endurance races.

== Results and standings ==
=== Season summary ===
Round	Race	Event	Pole position	Fastest lap	Winning driver	Winning team	Report
1	1	Sydney 500	(Australia) Cameron Waters	(Australia) Cameron Waters	(Australia) Cameron Waters	Tickford Racing	Report
1	2	Sydney 500	(Australia) Cameron Waters	(Australia) Cameron Waters	(Australia) Cameron Waters	Tickford Racing	Report
1	3	Sydney 500	(Australia) Cameron Waters	(Australia) Cameron Waters	(Australia) Cameron Waters	Tickford Racing	Report
2	4	Melbourne SuperSprint	(Australia) Broc Feeney	(Australia) Cameron Waters	(Australia) Broc Feeney	Triple Eight Race Engineering	Report
2	5	Melbourne SuperSprint	(Australia) Broc Feeney	(New Zealand) Ryan Wood	(Australia) Cameron Hill	Matt Stone Racing	Report
2	6	Melbourne SuperSprint	(Australia) Broc Feeney	(Australia) Will Brown	(Australia) Will Brown	Triple Eight Race Engineering	Report
2	7	Melbourne SuperSprint	(Australia) Broc Feeney	Race abandoned (Note: Race 4 was suspended due to torrential rain and could not be re-started. As less than 50% of the race distance had been completed when the race was abandoned, no points were awarded.)			Report
3	8	Taupō Super 440	(New Zealand) Matt Payne	(New Zealand) Matt Payne	(New Zealand) Matt Payne	Grove Racing	Report
3	9	Taupō Super 440	(Australia) Brodie Kostecki	(Australia) Chaz Mostert	(Australia) Chaz Mostert	Walkinshaw Andretti United	Report
3	10	Taupō Super 440	(Australia) Brodie Kostecki	(Australia) Broc Feeney	(New Zealand) Matt Payne	Grove Racing	Report
4	11	Tasmania Super 440	(Australia) Thomas Randle	(Australia) Broc Feeney	(Australia) Broc Feeney	Triple Eight Race Engineering	Report
4	12	Tasmania Super 440	(Australia) Broc Feeney	(Australia) Broc Feeney	(Australia) Broc Feeney	Triple Eight Race Engineering	Report
4	13	Tasmania Super 440	(Australia) Will Brown	(Australia) Broc Feeney	(New Zealand) Matt Payne	Grove Racing	Report
5	14	Perth Super 440	(Australia) Chaz Mostert	(Australia) Chaz Mostert	(New Zealand) Ryan Wood	Walkinshaw Andretti United	Report
5	15	Perth Super 440	(New Zealand) Ryan Wood	(Australia) Cameron Waters	(Australia) Broc Feeney	Triple Eight Race Engineering	Report
5	16	Perth Super 440	(Australia) Broc Feeney	(Australia) Broc Feeney	(Australia) Broc Feeney	Triple Eight Race Engineering	Report
6	17	Darwin Triple Crown	(Australia) Broc Feeney	(Australia) Cameron Waters	(Australia) Broc Feeney	Triple Eight Race Engineering	Report
6	18	Darwin Triple Crown	(Australia) Broc Feeney	(Australia) Broc Feeney	(Australia) Broc Feeney	Triple Eight Race Engineering	Report
6	19	Darwin Triple Crown	(Australia) Broc Feeney	(Australia) Kai Allen	(Australia) Broc Feeney	Triple Eight Race Engineering	Report
7	20	Townsville 500	(Australia) Brodie Kostecki	(Australia) Brodie Kostecki	(Australia) Brodie Kostecki	Dick Johnson Racing	Report
7	21	Townsville 500	(Australia) David Reynolds	(Australia) Will Brown	(Australia) Broc Feeney	Triple Eight Race Engineering	Report
7	22	Townsville 500	(Australia) Broc Feeney	(Australia) Jack Le Brocq	(Australia) Broc Feeney	Triple Eight Race Engineering	Report
8	23	Ipswich Super 440	(Australia) Broc Feeney	(Australia) Broc Feeney	(Australia) Broc Feeney	Triple Eight Race Engineering	Report
8	24	Ipswich Super 440	(Australia) Broc Feeney	(Australia) Will Brown	(Australia) Will Brown	Triple Eight Race Engineering	Report
8	25	Ipswich Super 440	(Australia) Broc Feeney	(Australia) Broc Feeney	(Australia) Broc Feeney	Triple Eight Race Engineering	Report
Enduro Cup
9	26	The Bend 500	(Australia) Broc Feeney	(Australia) Kai Allen	(Australia) Brodie Kostecki (Australia) Todd Hazelwood	Dick Johnson Racing	Report
10	27	Bathurst 1000	(Australia) Brodie Kostecki	(Australia) Will Brown	(New Zealand) Matt Payne (Australia) Garth Tander	Grove Racing	Report
Finals Series
Round of 10
11	28	Gold Coast 500	(New Zealand) Ryan Wood	(Australia) Chaz Mostert	(Australia) Chaz Mostert	Walkinshaw Andretti United	Report
11	29	Gold Coast 500	(Australia) Broc Feeney	(Australia) Anton de Pasquale	(Australia) Chaz Mostert	Walkinshaw Andretti United	Report
Round of 7
12	30	Sandown 500	(New Zealand) Ryan Wood	(Australia) Will Brown	(Australia) Chaz Mostert	Walkinshaw Andretti United	Report
12	31	Sandown 500	(Australia) Broc Feeney	(Australia) Cameron Hill	(Australia) Broc Feeney	Triple Eight Race Engineering	Report
Grand Final 4
13	32	Adelaide Grand Final	(Australia) Broc Feeney	(Australia) Brodie Kostecki	(Australia) Brodie Kostecki	Dick Johnson Racing	Report
13	33	Adelaide Grand Final	(Australia) Broc Feeney	(Australia) Cameron Waters	(Australia) Broc Feeney	Triple Eight Race Engineering	Report
13	34	Adelaide Grand Final	(Australia) Broc Feeney	(Australia) James Golding	(New Zealand) Matt Payne	Grove Racing	Report

=== Points system ===
Points were awarded for each race at an event, to the driver or drivers of a car that completed at least 75% of the race distance and was running at the completion of the race. At least 50% of the planned race distance must be completed for the result to be valid and championship points awarded.

Points format		Position																									
Points format		1st	2nd	3rd	4th	5th	6th	7th	8th	9th	10th	11th	12th	13th	14th	15th	16th	17th	18th	19th	20th	21st	22nd	23rd	24th	25th	FL
Rounds 1, 7	Race 1	60	55	51	47	43	40	36	33	31	28	26	24	22	20	19	17	16	15	13	12	11	10	10	9	8	5
Rounds 1, 7	Race 2 & 3	120	110	102	93	86	79	73	67	62	57	52	48	44	41	37	34	32	29	27	25	23	21	19	18	16	5
Round 2	All races	75	69	63	58	54	49	45	42	38	35	33	30	28	25	23	21	20	18	17	15	14	13	12	11	10	5
Rounds 3–6, 8	Race 1 & 2	80	74	68	62	57	53	49	45	41	38	35	32	29	27	25	23	21	19	18	16	15	14	13	12	11	5
Rounds 3–6, 8	Race 3	140	129	118	109	100	92	85	78	72	66	61	56	51	47	44	40	37	34	31	29	26	24	22	21	19	5
Rounds 9–10	Enduro race	300	276	258	240	222	204	192	180	168	156	144	138	132	126	120	114	108	102	96	90	84	78	72	66	60	
Rounds 11–12	All races	150	138	127	117	107	99	91	84	77	71	65	60	55	51	47	43	40	36	33	31	28	26	24	22	20	
Round 13	Race 1	50	46	42	39	36	33	30	28	26	24	22	20	18	17	16	14	13	12	11	10	9	9	8	7	7	
Round 13	Race 2 & 3	125	115	106	97	90	82	76	70	64	59	54	50	46	42	39	36	33	30	28	26	24	22	20	18	17	

- Rounds 1, 7: Used for the Sydney 500 and Townsville 500. Race 1 is 100km and Races 2 & 3 are 200km.
- Round 2: Used for the Melbourne SuperSprint. All four races are approximately 100km.
- Rounds 3–6, 8: Used for the Taupō Super 440, Tasmania Super 440, Perth Super 440, Darwin Triple Crown and Ipswich Super 440. Races 1 & 2 are 120km and Race 3 is 200km.
- Rounds 9–10: Used for The Bend 500 and Bathurst 1000.
- Rounds 11–12: Used for the Gold Coast 500 and Sandown 500. Both races are 250km.
- Round 13: Used for the Adelaide Grand Final. Race 1 is 100km and Races 2 & 3 are 250km.

=== Driver's championship ===
Eliminated after the Gold Coast 500 round
Eliminated after the Sandown 500 round

Pos.	Driver	No.	Sprint Cup																									Enduro Cup		Finals Series							Pen.	Pts
Pos.	Driver	No.	SMP			MEL				TAU			SYM			BAR			HID			TOW			QLD			BEN	BAT	SUR		SAN		ADE			Pen.	Pts
1	(Australia) Chaz Mostert (C)	25	2	4	3	10	10	22	C	13	1	3	14	19	18	3	3	6	6	17	12	6	2	3	25	7	6	8	Ret	1	1	1	4	2	2	2	0	5306
2	(Australia) Will Brown	1	5	3	2	2	3	1	C	5	7	8	5	11	3	2	2	5	8	7	5	10	4	2	4	1	23	4	17	5	8	2	3	9	4	3	0	5244
3	(Australia) Broc Feeney (SC)	88	14	2	5	1	4	2	C	15	5	7	1	1	2	4	1	1	1	1	1	8	1	1	1	2	1	19	6	2	2	4	1	4	1	20	0	5240
4	(Australia) Kai Allen	26	19	23	13	20	12	12	C	7	10	18	12	18	24	11	11	8	11	3	2	15	19	10	2	20	3	15	8	3	6	7	6	5	5	4	0	5223
5	(New Zealand) Matt Payne (EC)	19	4	5	6	9	11	10	C	1	4	1	15	7	1	6	5	2	3	8	3	4	3	5	12	6	4	3	1	10	4	6	22	6	6	1	0	4461
6	(Australia) Cameron Waters	6	1	1	1	6	6	8	C	2	14	12	4	3	12	7	4	4	2	10	24	2	20	4	17	5	2	2	12	4	5	12	21	12	8	12	0	4314
7	(Australia) Thomas Randle	55	3	6	11	8	20	16	C	22	6	5	2	4	14	10	6	9	13	22	19	13	21	8	10	19	14	9	11	9	7	16	13	Ret	7	9	0	4286
8	(Australia) Anton de Pasquale	18	8	7	7	7	8	7	C	4	20	16	17	17	23	19	9	18	14	2	7	3	6	6	8	4	8	10	20	8	16	8	2	8	13	5	0	3557
9	(Australia) Brodie Kostecki	38	6	14	4	4	7	5	C	12	3	4	DSQ	12	22	5	7	11	9	5	11	1	5	16	5	24	5	1	18	DNS	11	5	5	1	10	6	0	3536
10	(New Zealand) Ryan Wood	2	11	20	14	5	22	6	C	3	9	11	6	16	7	1	24	Ret	Ret	9	8	12	8	7	3	3	21	6	19	20	9	3	23	3	3	24	0	3455
Finals Series cut-off
Pos.	Driver	No.	SMP			MEL				TAU			SYM			BAR			HID			TOW			QLD			BEN	BAT	SUR		SAN		ADE			Pen.	Pts
11	(New Zealand) Andre Heimgartner	8	7	8	16	12	5	15	C	8	8	6	16	15	8	21	22	10	10	4	6	11	16	11	21	12	7	27	7	7	3	17	10	7	12	7	0	1784
12	(Australia) Cameron Hill	4	13	13	21	3	1	9	C	14	13	2	13	23	10	9	12	23	12	13	9	14	12	24	7	16	24	11	5	Ret	18	15	24	18	21	8	0	1514
13	(Australia) David Reynolds	20	15	22	22	17	23	17	C	11	17	17	19	9	6	16	19	7	19	Ret	15	20	10	21	24	9	11	13	2	14	12	19	9	20	11	11	0	1476
14	(Australia) James Golding	31	22	9	8	23	13	23	C	9	18	10	8	6	4	13	14	22	16	15	17	18	Ret	13	14	14	9	25	3	12	17	10	20	15	14	17	0	1458
15	(Australia) Bryce Fullwood	14	9	19	20	15	16	21	C	16	12	24	3	14	20	8	13	20	4	6	10	5	11	9	23	11	13	20	21	11	21	9	8	22	24	10	0	1340
16	(Australia) Nick Percat	10	12	21	15	13	2	3	C	19	15	23	20	2	9	12	8	17	7	11	16	22	14	12	18	13	22	5	Ret	18	22	23	19	14	18	22	0	1286
17	(Australia) Jack Le Brocq	9	10	12	10	19	Ret	19	C	6	11	15	11	10	16	15	15	15	Ret	14	4	9	7	20	19	Ret	12	12	14	15	15	24	16	21	22	Ret	0	1256
18	(Australia) Cooper Murray	99	18	17	23	21	9	Ret	C	23	23	22	18	20	21	20	23	Ret	17	18	13	17	9	22	6	23	17	7	4	Ret	13	14	11	24	16	23	0	1201
19	(Australia) James Courtney	7	17	11	12	DNS	17	14	C	21	22	20	9	13	15	17	16	3	5	12	20	21	Ret	18	13	15	25	17	Ret	6	Ret	13	7	11	9	14	0	1176
20	(Australia) Will Davison	17	21	24	9	11	15	4	C	10	2	9	DSQ	21	17	14	10	16	15	16	23	7	13	23	22	10	16	21	Ret	13	20	11	14	10	17	13	0	1171
21	(Australia) Macauley Jones	96	20	15	18	14	14	13	C	Ret	16	19	22	5	13	22	20	13	18	19	14	19	17	15	26	18	18	14	16	16	19	18	17	17	15	16	0	1062
22	(Australia) Aaron Cameron	3				22	19	20	C	20	24	21	21	24	19	25	18	19	20	20	22	23	18	19	9	22	19	24	9	17	10	22	12	19	Ret	15	0	874
23	(New Zealand) Jaxon Evans	12	16	10	19	18	18	18	C	18	19	14	7	8	11	18	Ret	12	Ret	DNS	DNS	Ret	Ret	17	11	Ret	15	18	Ret	Ret	14	21	15	13	19	18	0	855
24	(New Zealand) Richie Stanaway	62	23	Ret	17	16	21	11	C	17	21	13	10	22	5	24	17	14	22	Ret	18	16	15	14	15	8	10	23	Ret	19	Ret						0	768
25	(Australia) Jayden Ojeda	2/62																										6	19			20	18	16	20	19	0	400
26	(Australia) Zach Bates	888																							16	17	20	16	10								0	301
27	(Australia) Cameron Crick	35	25	18	24																				20	21	26	26	15								0	233
28	(Australia) Craig Lowndes	888																										16	10								0	228
29	(Australia) Rylan Gray	5																	21	21	21							22	13								0	218
30	(Australia) Lochie Dalton	5														23	21	21										22	13								0	216
31	(Australia) Aaron Love	3	24	16	25																																0	59
32	(United States) Austin Cindric	5																																23	23	21	0	52
33	(Australia) Todd Hazelwood	38																										1	18									
34	(Australia) Mark Winterbottom	6																										2	12									
35	(Australia) Garth Tander (EC)	19																										3	1									
36	(Australia) Scott Pye	1																										4	17									
37	(Australia) Tim Slade	10																										5	Ret									
38	(Australia) Jobe Stewart	99																										7	4									
39	(New Zealand) Fabian Coulthard	25																										8	Ret									
40	(Australia) James Moffat	55																										9	11									
41	(Australia) Harri Jones	18																										10	20									
42	(Australia) Cameron McLeod	4																										11	5									
43	(Australia) Jarrod Hughes	9																										12	14									
44	(Australia) Lee Holdsworth	20																										13	2									
45	(Australia) Jordan Boys	96																										14	16									
46	(Australia) Dale Wood	26																										15	8									
47	(Australia) Jack Perkins	7																										17	Ret									
48	(Australia) Jack Smith	12																										18	Ret									
49	(Australia) Jamie Whincup	88																										19	6									
50	(Australia) Brad Vaughan	14																										20	21									
51	(Australia) Tony D'Alberto	17																										21	Ret									
52	(Australia) Nash Morris	62																										23	Ret									
53	(Australia) Zak Best	3																										24	9									
54	(Australia) David Russell	31																										25	3									
55	(Australia) Aaron Seton	35																										26	15									
56	(Australia) Declan Fraser	8																										27	7									
Pos.	Driver	No.	SMP			MEL				TAU			SYM			BAR			HID			TOW			QLD			BEN	BAT	SUR		SAN		ADE			Pen.	Pts
Pos.	Driver	No.	Sprint Cup																									Enduro Cup		Finals Series							Pen.	Pts

=== Teams' championship ===
Pos.	Team	No.	SMP			MEL				TAU			SYM			BAR			HID			TOW			QLD			BEN	BAT	SUR		SAN		ADE			Pen.	Pts
1	Triple Eight Race Engineering	1	5	3	2	2	3	1	C	5	7	8	5	11	3	2	2	5	8	7	5	10	4	2	4	1	23	4	17	5	8	2	3	9	4	3	0	5792
1	Triple Eight Race Engineering	88	14	2	5	1	4	2	C	15	5	7	1	1	2	4	1	1	1	1	1	8	1	1	1	2	1	19	6	2	2	4	1	4	1	20	0	5792
2	Grove Racing	19	4	5	6	9	11	10	C	1	4	1	15	17	1	6	5	2	3	8	3	4	3	5	4	4	4	3	1	10	4	6	22	6	6	1	30 (Note: Grove Racing were deducted 30 Teams' Championship points following a pit stop breach during the Darwin Triple Crown.)	4736
2	Grove Racing	26	19	23	13	20	12	12	C	7	10	18	12	18	24	11	11	8	11	3	2	15	19	10	2	20	3	15	8	3	6	7	6	5	5	4	30	4736
3	Walkinshaw Andretti United	2	11	20	14	5	22	6	C	3	9	11	6	16	7	1	24	Ret	Ret	9	8	12	8	7	3	3	21	6	19	20	9	3	23	3	3	24	0	4187
3	Walkinshaw Andretti United	25	2	4	3	10	10	22	C	13	1	3	14	19	18	3	3	6	6	17	12	6	2	3	25	7	6	8	Ret	1	1	1	4	2	2	2	0	4187
4	Tickford Racing	6	1	1	1	6	6	8	C	2	14	12	4	3	12	7	4	4	2	10	24	2	20	4	17	5	2	2	12	4	5	12	21	12	8	12	30 (Note: Tickford Racing were deducted 30 Teams' Championship points for failing to provide paperwork prior to the Perth Super 440.)	4126
4	Tickford Racing	55	3	6	11	8	20	16	C	22	6	5	2	4	14	10	6	9	13	22	19	13	21	8	10	19	14	9	11	9	7	16	13	Ret	7	9	30	4126
5	Team 18	18	8	7	7	7	8	7	C	4	20	16	17	17	23	19	9	18	14	2	7	3	6	6	8	4	8	10	20	8	16	8	2	8	13	5	30	3325
5	Team 18	20	15	22	22	17	23	17	C	11	17	17	19	9	6	16	19	7	19	Ret	15	20	10	21	24	9	11	13	2	14	12	19	9	20	11	11	30	3325
6	Dick Johnson Racing	17	21	24	9	11	15	4	C	10	2	9	DSQ	21	17	14	10	16	15	16	23	7	13	23	22	10	16	21	Ret	13	20	11	14	10	17	13	130 (Note: Dick Johnson Racing were deducted 30 Teams' Championship points following a pit stop breach during the Townsville 500.)	3160
6	Dick Johnson Racing	38	6	14	4	4	7	5	C	12	3	4	DSQ	12	22	5	7	11	9	5	11	1	5	16	5	24	5	1	18	DNS	11	5	5	1	10	6	130	3160
7	Brad Jones Racing	8	7	8	16	12	5	15	C	8	8	6	16	15	8	21	22	10	10	4	6	11	16	11	21	12	7	27	7	7	3	17	10	7	12	7	0	3124
7	Brad Jones Racing	14	9	19	20	15	16	21	C	16	12	24	3	14	20	8	13	20	4	6	10	5	11	9	23	11	13	20	21	11	21	9	8	22	24	10	0	3124
8	Matt Stone Racing	4	13	13	21	3	1	9	C	14	13	2	13	23	10	9	12	23	12	13	9	14	12	24	7	16	24	11	5	Ret	18	15	24	18	21	8	60 (Note: Matt Stone Racing were deducted 30 Teams' Championship points twice after a pit stop breach during the Sydney 500 and a tyre sensor breach at the Taupō Super 440.)	2740
8	Matt Stone Racing	10	12	21	15	13	2	3	C	19	15	23	20	2	9	12	8	17	7	11	16	22	14	12	18	13	22	5	Ret	18	22	23	19	14	18	22	60	2740
9	Erebus Motorsport	9	10	12	10	19	Ret	19	C	6	11	15	11	10	16	15	15	15	Ret	14	4	9	7	20	19	Ret	12	12	14	15	15	24	16	21	22	Ret	0	2457
9	Erebus Motorsport	99	18	17	23	21	9	Ret	C	23	23	22	18	20	21	20	23	Ret	17	18	13	17	9	22	6	23	17	7	4	Ret	13	14	11	24	16	23	0	2457
10	PremiAir Racing	31	22	9	8	23	13	23	C	9	18	10	8	6	4	13	14	22	16	15	20	18	Ret	13	14	14	9	25	3	12	17	10	20	15	14	17	60 (Note: PremiAir Racing were deducted 30 Teams' Championship points for leaving tyres in the fast lane during the Perth Super 440.)	2326
10	PremiAir Racing	62	23	Ret	17	16	21	11	C	17	21	13	10	22	5	24	17	14	22	Ret	18	16	15	14	15	8	10	23	Ret	19	Ret	20	18	16	20	19	60	2326
11	Blanchard Racing Team	3	24	16	25	22	19	20	C	20	24	21	21	24	19	25	18	19	20	20	22	23	18	19	9	22	19	24	9	17	10	22	12	19	Ret	15	0	2109
11	Blanchard Racing Team	7	17	11	12	DNS	17	14	C	21	22	20	9	13	15	17	16	3	5	12	20	21	Ret	18	13	15	25	17	Ret	6	Ret	13	7	11	19	14	0	2109
12	Brad Jones Racing	12	16	10	19	18	18	18	C	18	19	14	7	8	11	18	Ret	12	Ret	DNS	DNS	Ret	Ret	17	11	Ret	15	18	Ret	Ret	14	21	15	13	19	18	0	1917
12	Brad Jones Racing	96	20	15	18	14	14	13	C	Ret	16	`8	22	5	13	22	20	13	18	19	14	19	17	15	26	18	18	14	16	16	19	18	17	17	15	16	0	1917
13	Triple Eight Race Engineering (w)	888																							16	17	20	16	10								0	301
14	Tickford Racing (w)	5														23	21	21	21	21	21							22	13					23	23	21	30	294
15	Matt Stone Racing (w)	35	25	18	24																				20	21	26	26	15								0	233
Pos.	Driver	No.	SMP			MEL				TAU			SYM			BAR			HID			TOW			QLD			BEN	BAT	SUR		SAN		ADE			Pen.	Pts

- (w) denotes wildcard entry.
