= Melbourne SuperSprint =

Annual motor racing event in Australia

(Victoria (state)) Melbourne SuperSprint
- Race Information
Venue	Albert Park Circuit
Number of times held	8
First held	2018
- Race Format
- Race 1
Laps	19
Distance	100 km
- Race 2
Laps	19
Distance	100 km
- Race 3
Laps	19
Distance	100 km
- Race 4
Laps	14
Distance	70 km
- Last Event (2026)
- Overall Winner
(Australia) Brodie Kostecki	Dick Johnson Racing
- Race Winners
(Australia) Brodie Kostecki	Dick Johnson Racing
(Australia) Brodie Kostecki	Dick Johnson Racing
(Australia) Broc Feeney	Triple Eight Race Engineering
(Australia) Brodie Kostecki	Dick Johnson Racing

The Melbourne SuperSprint is an annual motor racing event for Supercars, held at the Albert Park Circuit in Melbourne, Victoria since 2018. The 2018 edition was the first time that a championship round was contested at the circuit, after several years of supporting the Australian Grand Prix as a non-championship event.

== Format ==
The event is staged over a four-day weekend, from Thursday to Sunday, as a support category in the lead-up to the Australian Grand Prix. Two thirty-minute practice sessions, two fifteen-minute qualifying sessions to determine the starting grid for the first and second races, and the first 100 kilometre race are held on Thursday. The second 100 km race is then held on Friday before two further fifteen-minute qualifying sessions to determine the starting grid for the third and fourth races. The 100 km race three is held on Saturday and the 70 km race four is held on Sunday.

=== Larry Perkins Trophy ===
The driver who accumulates the most points across the four races receives the "Larry Perkins Trophy", named in honour of the Supercars Hall of Fame inductee who also started eleven Formula One Grands Prix. The perpetual trophy was designed in collaboration between a student and senior lecturer at RMIT University and was partly created using 3D printing.

== History ==
Supercars Championship have held non-championship events at the Australian Grand Prix dating back to its first appearance on the Formula One calendar in 1985. The support event, most recently known as the Supercars Challenge, was held in every year from 1985 to 2017 except 2007. After the demise of the event, the series finally attained championship status for the 2018 season.

The inaugural event saw four different winners across the four races, including Scott Pye's first championship race win in a dramatic third race of the weekend. Pye had taken the lead early in the race, and was among the drivers to remain on slick tyres during a late-race shower. Despite a brief off-track moment in the changing conditions, Pye held on for a narrow victory, the first for Walkinshaw Andretti United since the foreign investment in the team. One victory and three further podiums across the weekend saw Jamie Whincup take the overall event victory and the first Larry Perkins Trophy.

In the event's second year, Scott McLaughlin failed to win the event despite winning three of the four races across the weekend, including the 1,000th Australian Touring Car Championship race. In the other race, McLaughlin and Cam Waters, who were first and second on the grid, clashed on the way to the grid, leaving both drivers out of the race. The race was won by Chaz Mostert, who also went on to win the round and the trophy. The 2020 event, along with the 2020 Australian Grand Prix, was cancelled on the Friday morning of the event due to the COVID-19 pandemic. Two qualifying sessions had already been held the previous day. The event was included in the 2021 calendar, however was cancelled along with the Formula One round.

The Grand Prix returned in 2022 to record crowds in Melbourne. The four races were shared equally between Mostert and Shane van Gisbergen, with the latter winning the trophy despite finishing the final race in 20th position due to a tyre failure. In 2023, Brodie Kostecki won his first two championship races at the event, as well as the event win, on the way to winning his first title. In 2024, Matthew Payne was involved in two incidents in two races whilst battling for the lead - one with Mostert and one with Waters. Will Brown won his second consecutive Larry Perkins Trophy in 2025, aided by an abandoned fourth race due to wet weather - a race in which Brown was to start 21st on the grid. In the weekend's second race, Cameron Hill won his first championship race in a one-two finish for Matt Stone Racing. In 2026, at the start of the final race of the weekend, Broc Feeney was involved in a big pile up crash at the first corner, which also involved Cooper Murray and Zach Bates.

== Winners ==
The original circuit layout used prior to 2022.

Year	Driver	Team	Car	Report
2018	(Australia) Jamie Whincup	Triple Eight Race Engineering	Holden ZB Commodore	Report
2019	(Australia) Chaz Mostert	Tickford Racing	Ford Mustang GT	Report
2020	cancelled due to COVID-19 pandemic			Report
2021	not held due to COVID-19 pandemic			
2022	(New Zealand) Shane van Gisbergen	Triple Eight Race Engineering	Holden ZB Commodore	Report
2023	(Australia) Brodie Kostecki	Erebus Motorsport	Chevrolet Camaro ZL1-1LE	Report
2024	(Australia) Will Brown	Triple Eight Race Engineering	Chevrolet Camaro ZL1-1LE	Report
2025	(Australia) Will Brown	Triple Eight Race Engineering	Chevrolet Camaro ZL1-1LE	Report
2026	(Australia) Brodie Kostecki	Dick Johnson Racing	Ford Mustang S650	Report
2027				Report

== Multiple winners ==
=== By driver ===
Wins	Driver	Years
2	(Australia) Will Brown	2024, 2025
2	(Australia) Brodie Kostecki	2023, 2026

=== By team ===
Wins	Team
4	Triple Eight Race Engineering

=== By manufacturer ===
Wins	Manufacturer
3	Chevrolet
2	Holden
2	Ford

== Event names and sponsors ==
- 2018: Coates Hire Melbourne 400
- 2019–20, 2022: Beaurepaires Melbourne 400
- 2023: Beaurepaires Melbourne SuperSprint
- 2024–25: MSS Security Melbourne SuperSprint
- 2026: Melbourne SuperSprint

== See also ==
- List of Australian Touring Car Championship races
