= Cameron Hill =

Australian racing driver

Cam Hill
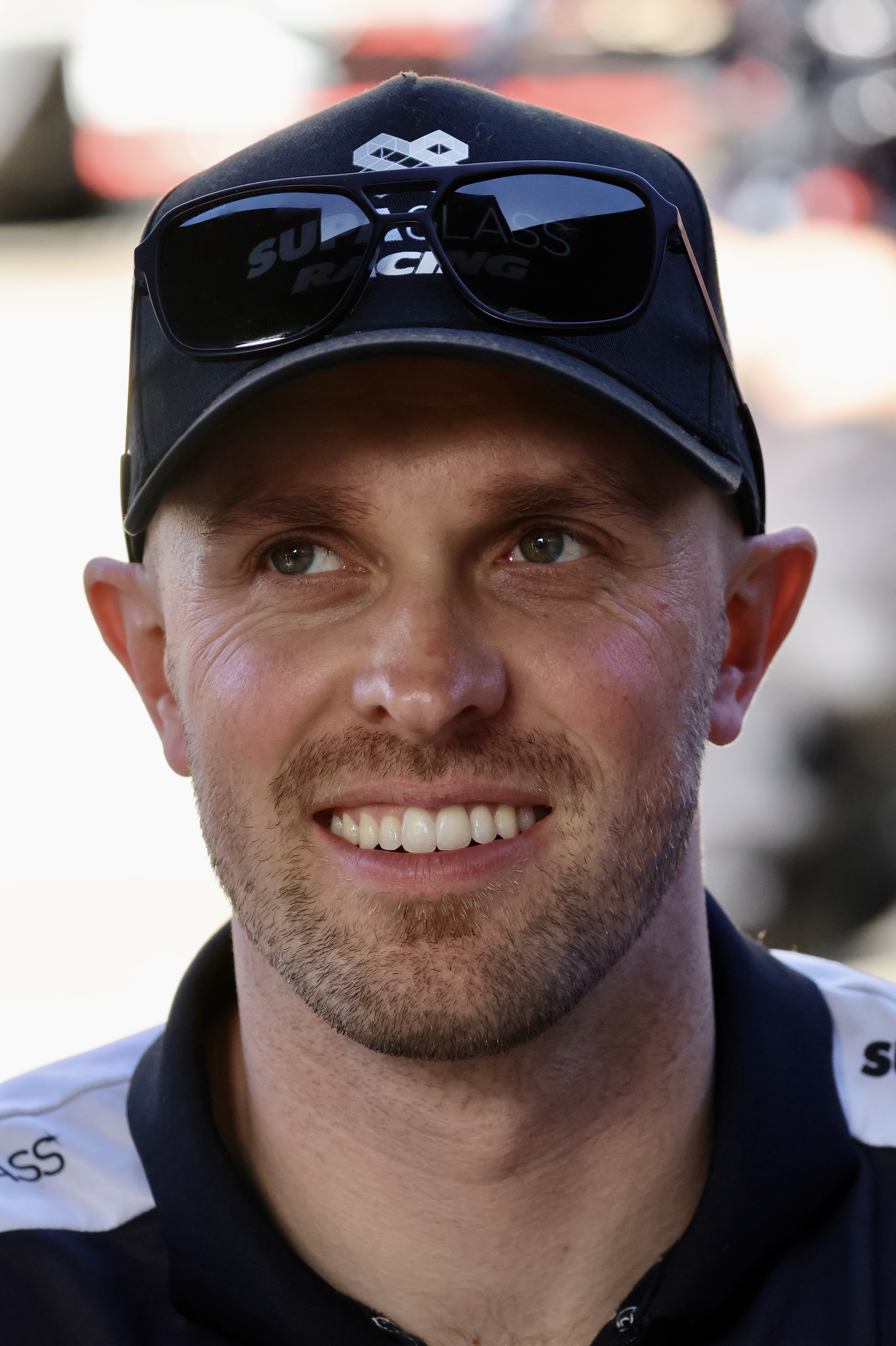
- Hill at the Adelaide Street Circuit in 2025
- Nationality: Australian
- Born: Cameron James Hill; 28 November 1996 (age 29) Canberra, Australian Capital Territory

Supercars Championship career
- Debut season: 2023
- Current team: Brad Jones Racing
- Categorisation: FIA Gold
- Car number: 14
- Former teams: Matt Stone Racing
- Starts: 112
- Wins: 1
- Podiums: 3
- Poles: 0
- Best finish: 12th in 2024

Previous series
- 2022 2018–21 2016-17 2014-15 2010-13: Dunlop Super2 Series; Porsche Carrera Cup Australia; Toyota 86 Racing Series; Australian Formula Ford Series; Karting

Championship titles
- 2021 2015: Porsche Carrera Cup Australia; Australian Formula Ford Series

Cameron James "Cam" Hill (born 26 November 1996) is an Australian racing driver. He currently races in the Supercars Championship for Brad Jones Racing in the No. 14 Toyota Supra GR. Hill won the 2015 Australian Formula Ford Series and 2021 Porsche Carrera Cup Australia.

== Career ==
=== Karting ===
Hill started karting at the age of ten, winning numerous state championships in his junior years. In 2012, Hill won the National Pro Junior (KF3) Australian Championship.

=== Formula Ford ===
Hill progressed to the Australian Formula Ford Championship in 2014. Driving for his privately-run family team, Hill achieved several podium finishes in his rookie season. In 2015, Hill won the Championship with 12 race wins.

=== Toyota 86 Racing Series ===
In 2016 and 2017, Hill competed in the Australian Toyota 86 Racing Series, finishing 3rd in the Championship in 2016 and 2nd in the Championship in 2017.

=== Porsche Carrera Cup Australia ===
Hill competed in the Porsche Carrera Cup Australia Championship from 2018 to 2021, winning the 2021 Porsche Carrera Cup Australia Championship.

=== Bathurst 6 Hour ===
On 17 April 2022, Hill and co-driver Thomas Sargent won the outright honours in the Bathurst 6 hour endurance race. Hill and Sargent took the event after starting 63rd and last on the grid.

=== Dunlop Super 2 Series ===
Hill competed in the 2022 Dunlop Super 2 Series for Triple Eight Race Engineering in the No. 111 Holden Commodore.

=== Supercars Championship ===
Hill made his Supercars debut at the 2022 Bathurst 1000, driving for PremiAir Racing. He made his full time debut in 2023 for Matt Stone Racing.

== Career results ==
=== Karting career summary ===
Season	Series	Position
2009	Queensland Kart Championship - Rookies	4th
2009	New South Wales Kart Championship - Rookies	**1st**
2010	Australian National Sprint Kart Championship - Junior National Light	7th
2012	Australian Rotax Nationals - Rotax Junior	8th
2013	CIK Stars of Karting - Pro Gearbox KZ2	12th
2013	SKUSA SuperNationals XVII - KZ2	15th
2013	Race of Stars - KZ2	19th

=== Career race results ===
Season	Series	Car	Team	Position
2014	Australian Formula Ford Series	Mygale SJ10a	Colin Hill Engineering	6th
2015	Australian Formula Ford Series	Mygale SJ10a	Colin Hill Engineering	1st
2016	Toyota 86 Racing Series	Toyota 86	Cameron Hill Racing	3rd
2017	Toyota 86 Racing Series	Toyota 86	Cameron Hill Racing	2nd
2018	Porsche Carrera Cup Australia	Porsche 911 GT3 991.II	Cameron Hill Racing	9th
2019	Porsche Carrera Cup Australia	Porsche 911 GT3 991.II	Cameron Hill Racing	6th
2020	Porsche Carrera Cup Australia	Porsche 911 GT3 991.II	Cameron Hill Racing	NC
2021	Porsche Carrera Cup Australia	Porsche 911 GT3 991.II	Cameron Hill Racing	1st
2022	Dunlop Super2 Series	Holden Commodore VF	Triple Eight Race Engineering	5th
2022	Repco Supercars Championship	Holden Commodore ZB	PremiAir Racing	51st
2023	Repco Supercars Championship	Chevrolet Camaro ZL1	Matt Stone Racing	23rd
2024	Repco Supercars Championship	Chevrolet Camaro ZL1	Matt Stone Racing	12th

=== Super2 Series results ===
(key) (Race results only)

Super2 Series results
Year	Team	No.	Car	1	2	3	4	5	6	7	8	9	10	11	12	Position	Points
2022	Triple Eight Race Engineering	111	Holden VF Commodore	SMP; R1; 7	SMP; R2; 11	WAN; R3; 2	WAN; R4; 4	TOW; R5; 6	TOW; R6; 3	SAN; R7; 14	SAN; R8; 11	BAT; R9; 4	BAT; R10; C	ADE; R11; 3	ADE; R12; Ret	5th	1047

=== Supercars Championship results ===
(Races in bold indicate pole position) (Races in italics indicate fastest lap)

Supercars results
Year	Team	No.	Car	1	2	3	4	5	6	7	8	9	10	11	12	13	14	15	16	17	18	19	20	21	22	23	24	25	26	27	28	29	30	31	32	33	34	35	36	37	Position	Points
2022	PremiAir Racing	22	Holden ZB Commodore	SMP; R1	SMP; R2	SYM; R3	SYM; R4	SYM; R5	MEL; R6	MEL; R7	MEL; R8	MEL; R9	BAR; R10	BAR; R11	BAR; R12	WIN; R13	WIN; R14	WIN; R15	HID; R16	HID; R17	HID; R18	TOW; R19	TOW; R20	BEN; R21	BEN; R22	BEN; R23	SAN; R24; PO	SAN; R25; PO	SAN; R26; PO	PUK; R27	PUK; R28	PUK; R29	BAT; R30; 21	SUR; R31	SUR; R32	ADE; R33	ADE; R34				51st	84
2023	Matt Stone Racing	35	Chevrolet Camaro ZL1	NEW; R1; 20	NEW; R2; 21	MEL; R3; 18	MEL; R4; 15	MEL; R5; 17	MEL; R6; Ret	BAR; R7; 23	BAR; R8; 25	BAR; R9; 16	SYM; R10; 8	SYM; R11; 11	SYM; R12; 11	HID; R13; 13	HID; R14; 15	HID; R15; 16	TOW; R16; 17	TOW; R17; 22	SMP; R18; 17	SMP; R19; 24	BEN; R20; Ret	BEN; R21; 20	BEN; R22; 19	SAN; R23; Ret	BAT; R24; 15	SUR; R25; 23	SUR; R26; 15	ADE; R27; 22	ADE; R28; 17										23rd	1080
2024	Matt Stone Racing	4	Chevrolet Camaro ZL1	BAT1; R1; 5	BAT1; R2; 23	MEL; R3; 13	MEL; R4; 20	MEL; R5; 15	MEL; R6; Ret	TAU; R7; 20	TAU; R8; 12	BAR; R9; 11	BAR; R10; 11	HID; R11; 16	HID; R12; 9	TOW; R13; 10	TOW; R14; 9	SMP; R15; 11	SMP; R16; 14	SYM; R17; 6	SYM; R18; 12	SAN; R19; 10	BAT; R20; 10	SUR; R21; 23	SUR; R22; 14	ADE; R23; 18	ADE; R24; 16														12th	1615
2025	Matt Stone Racing	4	Chevrolet Camaro ZL1	SMP; R1; 13	SMP; R2; 13	SMP; R3; 21	MEL; R4; 3	MEL; R5; 1	MEL; R6; 9	MEL; R7; C	TAU; R8; 14	TAU; R9; 13	TAU; R10; 2	SYM; R11; 13	SYM; R12; 23	SYM; R13; 10	BAR; R14; 9	BAR; R15; 12	BAR; R16; 23	HID; R17; 12	HID; R18; 13	HID; R19; 9	TOW; R20; 14	TOW; R21; 12	TOW; R22; 24	QLD; R23; 7	QLD; R24; 16	QLD; R25; 24	BEN; R26; 11	BAT; R27; 5	SUR; R28; Ret	SUR; R29; 18	SAN; R30; 15	SAN; R31; 24	ADE; R32; 18	ADE; R33; 21	ADE; R34; 8				12th	1515
2026	Brad Jones Racing	14	Toyota GR Supra	SMP; R1; 16	SMP; R2; 12	SMP; R3; 7	MEL; R4; 18	MEL; R5; 11	MEL; R6; 8	MEL; R7; 13	TAU; R8; 11	TAU; R9; 16	CHR; R10; Ret	CHR; R11; 24	CHR; R12; 16	CHR; R13; 12	SYM; R14; 7	SYM; R15; 9	SYM; R16; 19	HID; R20; 12	HID; R21; 19	HID; R22; 9	TOW; R23; 19	TOW; R24; 25	TOW; R25; 20	BAR; R17; 14	BAR; R18; 20	BAR; R19; 19	QLD; R26	QLD; R27	QLD; R28	BEN; R28	BAT; R30	SUR; R31	SUR; R32	SAN; R33	SAN; R34	ADE; R35	ADE; R36	ADE; R37	16th*	771*

=== Complete Bathurst 1000 results ===
Year	Team	Car	Co-driver	Position	Laps
2022	PremiAir Racing	Holden Commodore ZB	(New Zealand) Chris Pither	21st	153
2023	Matt Stone Racing	Chevrolet Camaro Mk.6	(Australia) Jaylyn Robotham	15th	161
2024	Matt Stone Racing	Chevrolet Camaro Mk.6	(Australia) Cameron Crick	10th	161
2025	Matt Stone Racing	Chevrolet Camaro Mk.6	(Australia) Cameron McLeod	5th	161

=== Complete Bathurst 12 Hour results ===
Year	Team	Co-drivers	Car	Class	Laps	Pos.	Class pos.
2018	(Australia) Steven Richards Motorsport	(Australia) Dean Grant (Australia) Xavier West	BMW M4 GT4	C	162	30th	4th
2024	(Australia) Matt Stone Racing	(Australia) Nick Percat (Australia) John Holinger	MARC IRC GT	I	222	21st	**3rd**

=== Complete Bathurst 6 Hour results ===
Year	Team	Co-drivers	Car	Class	Laps	Pos.	Class pos.
2017	(Australia) Strathbrook	(Australia) James Abela	Subaru WRX STI	A1	112	9th	8th
2022	(Australia) Colin Hill Engineering	(Australia) Thomas Sargent	BMW M2 Competition	X	130	**1st**	**1st**
