= 2022 Bathurst 1000 =

Motor race in Australia

(New South Wales) 2022 Repco Bathurst 1000
Event Information
- Round 11 of 13 in the 2022 Supercars Championship
- Layout of the Mount Panorama Circuit
- Date: October 6–9 2022
- Location: Bathurst, New South Wales
- Venue: Mount Panorama Circuit

Results
Race 1
Distance	161 laps	1000 km
Pole position	(Australia) Cameron Waters; Tickford Racing	2:23.6168
Winner	(New Zealand) Shane van Gisbergen (Australia) Garth Tander; Triple Eight Race Engineering	6hr 41min 53.7221sec

The 2022 Bathurst 1000 (known as the 2022 Repco Bathurst 1000 for commercial reasons) was a motor racing event for Supercars held on the week of 6 to 9 October 2022. It hosted the eleventh round of the 2022 Supercars Championship. It took place at the Mount Panorama Circuit in Bathurst, New South Wales, Australia and featured a single 1000 kilometre race.

Shane van Gisbergen and Garth Tander claimed their second and fifth event Bathurst 1000 victory respectively, in a Triple Eight Race Engineering run Holden Commodore ZB. It was Holden's 36th and final win in their final start at the Bathurst 1000.

== Report ==
=== Background ===
The event was the 65th running of the Bathurst 1000, which was first held at the Phillip Island Grand Prix Circuit in 1960 as a 500-mile race for Australian-made standard production sedans, and marked the 62nd time that the race was held at Mount Panorama. It was the 26th running of the Australian 1000 race, which was first held after the organisational split between the Australian Racing Drivers Club and V8 Supercars Australia that saw two "Bathurst 1000" races contested in both 1997 and 1998.

It was the final time that Holden badged cars would participate in the Bathurst 1000, the brand having made its debut in the 1961 Armstrong 500 event at Phillip Island with a single dealer entry Holden EK Special sedan. General Motors announced in February 2020 its intention to retire the brand by 2021.

Chaz Mostert and Lee Holdsworth were the defending race winner. Mostert remained at Walkinshaw Andretti United, while Holdsworth moved to Grove Racing as a full time driver.

=== Entry list ===
Twenty-eight cars entered the event - 19 Holden Commodores and nine Ford Mustangs, making it the biggest grid since 2013. In addition to the 25 regular entries, three wildcard entries were entered. One from Erebus Motorsport, for Greg Murphy and Richie Stanaway, one from Matt Chahda Motorsport, for Matt Chahda and Jaylyn Robotham, and one from Triple Eight Race Engineering, for Craig Lowndes and Declan Fraser.

Seven drivers made their Bathurst 1000 debut, ADAC GT Masters driver Jaxon Evans and Super2 drivers Matt Chahda, Declan Fraser, Cameron Hill, Matthew Payne, Jaylyn Robotham and Aaron Seton. For Aaron, he became the first third generation driver to make a Bathurst 1000 appearance, after his father Glenn Seton and his grandfather, 1965 Armstrong 500 race winner, Barry Seton.

Teams Grove Racing, Matt Chahda Motorsport and PremiAir Racing made their debut in the Bathurst 1000. With Grove Racing a continuation of Kelly Racing, Matt Chahda Motorsport a Super2 Series team and PremiAir Racing an all new team, which took over Team Sydney.

No.	Drivers	Team (Sponsors)	Car	No.	Drivers	Team (Sponsors)	Car
2	(Australia) Nick Percat (Australia) Warren Luff	Walkinshaw Andretti United (Mobil 1, NTI Insurance)	Holden Commodore ZB	26	(Australia) David Reynolds (Australia) Matt Campbell	Grove Racing (Penrite)	Ford Mustang S550
3	(Australia) Tim Slade (Australia) Tim Blanchard	Blanchard Racing Team (CoolDrive)	Ford Mustang S550	31	(Australia) James Golding (Australia) Dylan O'Keeffe	PremiAir Racing (Subway)	Holden Commodore ZB
4	(Australia) Jack Smith (New Zealand) Jaxon Evans	Brad Jones Racing (SCT Logistics)	Holden Commodore ZB	34	(Australia) Jack Le Brocq (Australia) Aaron Seton	Matt Stone Racing (Truck Assist)	Holden Commodore ZB
5	(Australia) James Courtney (Australia) Zane Goddard	Tickford Racing (Snowy River Caravans)	Ford Mustang S550	35	(Australia) Todd Hazelwood (Australia) Jayden Ojeda	Matt Stone Racing (Truck Assist)	Holden Commodore ZB
6	(Australia) Cameron Waters (Australia) James Moffat	Tickford Racing (Monster Energy)	Ford Mustang S550	51	(New Zealand) Greg Murphy (New Zealand) Richie Stanaway	Erebus Motorsport (Boost Mobile)	Holden Commodore ZB
8	(New Zealand) Andre Heimgartner (Australia) Dale Wood	Brad Jones Racing (R&J Batteries)	Holden Commodore ZB	55	(Australia) Thomas Randle (Australia) Zak Best	Tickford Racing (Castrol, BP)	Ford Mustang S550
9	(Australia) Will Brown (Australia) Jack Perkins	Erebus Motorsport (Boost Mobile)	Holden Commodore ZB	56	(Australia) Jake Kostecki (Australia) Kurt Kostecki	Tickford Racing (Tradie Underwear)	Ford Mustang S550
10	(Australia) Lee Holdsworth (New Zealand) Matthew Payne	Grove Racing (Penrite)	Ford Mustang S550	88	(Australia) Broc Feeney (Australia) Jamie Whincup	Triple Eight Race Engineering (Red Bull, Ampol)	Holden Commodore ZB
14	(Australia) Bryce Fullwood (Australia) Dean Fiore	Brad Jones Racing (Middy's Electrical)	Holden Commodore ZB	96	(Australia) Macauley Jones (Australia) Jordan Boys	Brad Jones Racing (Wet and Forget)	Holden Commodore ZB
17	(Australia) Will Davison (Australia) Alex Davison	Dick Johnson Racing (Shell V-Power)	Ford Mustang S550	97	(New Zealand) Shane van Gisbergen (Australia) Garth Tander	Triple Eight Race Engineering (Red Bull, Ampol)	Holden Commodore ZB
18	(Australia) Mark Winterbottom (Australia) Michael Caruso	Charlie Schwerkolt Racing (Irwin Tools, Bunnings)	Holden Commodore ZB	99	(Australia) Brodie Kostecki (Australia) David Russell	Erebus Motorsport (Boost Mobile)	Holden Commodore ZB
20	(Australia) Scott Pye (Australia) Tyler Everingham	Charlie Schwerkolt Racing (Alspec, Toyota Forklifts)	Holden Commodore ZB	100	(Australia) Anton de Pasquale (Australia) Tony D'Alberto	Dick Johnson Racing (Shell V-Power)	Ford Mustang S550
22	(New Zealand) Chris Pither (Australia) Cameron Hill	PremiAir Racing (Coca-Cola)	Holden Commodore ZB	118	(Australia) Matt Chahda (Australia) Jaylyn Robotham	Matt Chahda Motorsport (Caltex, Jack & Co Local Store)	Holden Commodore ZB
25	(Australia) Chaz Mostert (New Zealand) Fabian Coulthard	Walkinshaw Andretti United (Mobil 1, Optus)	Holden Commodore ZB	888	(Australia) Declan Fraser (Australia) Craig Lowndes	Triple Eight Race Engineering (Supercheap Auto)	Holden Commodore ZB

Entries with a grey background are wildcard entries which do not compete in the full championship season.

== Results ==
=== Practice summary ===
Session	Day	Fastest Lap						
Session	Day	No.	Driver	Team	Car	Time	Cond	Ref
Practice 1	Thursday	17	(Australia) Will Davison	Dick Johnson Racing	Ford Mustang S550	02:04.369	Fine	
Practice 2 (Co-Driver)	Thursday	97	(Australia) Garth Tander	Triple Eight Race Engineering	Holden Commodore ZB	02:04.135	Fine	
Practice 3	Friday	17	(Australia) Will Davison	Dick Johnson Racing	Ford Mustang S550	02:04.207	Fine	
Practice 4	Friday	97	(New Zealand) Shane van Gisbergen	Triple Eight Race Engineering	Holden Commodore ZB	02:30.292	Wet	
Practice 5 (Co-Driver)	Saturday	8	(Australia) Dale Wood	Brad Jones Racing	Holden Commodore ZB	02:26.222	Wet	
Practice 6	Saturday	25	(Australia) Chaz Mostert	Walkinshaw Andretti United	Holden Commodore ZB	02:05.510	Fine	
Warm Up	Sunday	17	(Australia) Will Davison	Dick Johnson Racing	Ford Mustang S550	02:22.459	Drying	

=== Qualifying ===
Pos	No.	Driver	Team	Car	Time	Gap	Grid
1	6	(Australia) Cameron Waters	Tickford Racing	Ford Mustang S550	2:23.6168		Top 10
2	10	(Australia) Lee Holdsworth	Grove Racing	Ford Mustang S550	2:23.8296	+0.2128s	Top 10
3	25	(Australia) Chaz Mostert	Walkinshaw Andretti United	Holden Commodore ZB	2:23.8360	+0.2913s	Top 10
4	97	(New Zealand) Shane van Gisbergen	Triple Eight Race Engineering	Holden Commodore ZB	2:24.0664	+0.4497s	Top 10
5	51	(New Zealand) Richie Stanaway	Erebus Motorsport	Holden Commodore ZB	2:24.3527	+0.7359s	Top 10
6	17	(Australia) Will Davison	Dick Johnson Racing	Ford Mustang S550	2:24.4223	+0.8055s	Top 10
7	2	(Australia) Nick Percat	Walkinshaw Andretti United	Holden Commodore ZB	2:24.5634	+0.9466s	Top 10
8	5	(Australia) James Courtney	Tickford Racing	Ford Mustang S550	2:24.6455	+1.0287s	Top 10
9	99	(Australia) Brodie Kostecki	Erebus Motorsport	Holden Commodore ZB	2:24.7897	+1.1729s	Top 10
10	9	(Australia) Will Brown	Erebus Motorsport	Holden Commodore ZB	2:25.0004	+1.3836s	Top 10
11	100	(Australia) Anton de Pasquale	Dick Johnson Racing	Ford Mustang S550	2:25.0081	+1.3914s	11
12	8	(New Zealand) Andre Heimgartner	Brad Jones Racing	Holden Commodore ZB	2:25.0130	+1.3962s	12
13	31	(Australia) James Golding	PremiAir Racing	Holden Commodore ZB	2:25.0149	+1.3981s	13
14	88	(Australia) Jamie Whincup	Triple Eight Race Engineering	Holden Commodore ZB	2:25.1273	+1.5106s	14
15	55	(Australia) Thomas Randle	Tickford Racing	Ford Mustang S550	2:25.1521	+1.5354s	15
16	888	(Australia) Craig Lowndes	Triple Eight Race Engineering	Holden Commodore ZB	2:25.3523	+1.7356s	16
17	56	(Australia) Jake Kostecki	Tickford Racing	Ford Mustang S550	2:25.4653	+1.8485s	17
18	26	(Australia) David Reynolds	Grove Racing	Ford Mustang S550	2:25.4723	+1.8556s	18
19	35	(Australia) Todd Hazelwood	Matt Stone Racing	Holden Commodore ZB	2:26.0742	+2.4575s	19
20	20	(Australia) Scott Pye	Charlie Schwerkolt Racing	Holden Commodore ZB	2:26.0764	+2.4596s	20
21	22	(New Zealand) Chris Pither	PremiAir Racing	Holden Commodore ZB	2:26.4081	+2.7914s	21
22	96	(Australia) Macauley Jones	Brad Jones Racing	Holden Commodore ZB	2:26.6575	+3.0407s	22
23	18	(Australia) Mark Winterbottom	Charlie Schwerkolt Racing	Holden Commodore ZB	2:27.0161	+3.3994s	23
24	14	(Australia) Bryce Fullwood	Brad Jones Racing	Holden Commodore ZB	2:27.1369	+3.5201s	24
25	34	(Australia) Jack Le Brocq	Matt Stone Racing	Holden Commodore ZB	2:27.5240	+3.9072s	25
26	118	(Australia) Matt Chahda	Matt Chahda Motorsport	Holden Commodore ZB	2:28.2436	+4.6269s	26
27	4	(Australia) Jack Smith	Brad Jones Racing	Holden Commodore ZB	2:28.3813	+4.7645s	27
28	3	(Australia) Tim Slade	Blanchard Racing Team	Ford Mustang S550	2:31.3185	+7.7017s	28

=== Top 10 Shootout ===
The Top 10 Shootout was cancelled due to inclement weather. It was the first time the Shootout or its predecessor Hardies Heroes was not held since it was introduced in 1978 (in 1988 the Shootout was held but did not count for pole position). As a result, the top ten positions on the grid were determined by the order of the original Friday Qualifying session.

=== Grid ===
Inside row			Outside row		
1	(Australia) Cameron Waters (Australia) James Moffat	6	10	(Australia) Lee Holdsworth (New Zealand) Matthew Payne	2
1	Tickford Racing (Ford Mustang S550)		Grove Racing (Ford Mustang S550)		2
3	(Australia) Chaz Mostert (New Zealand) Fabian Coulthard	25	51	(New Zealand) Greg Murphy (New Zealand) Richie Stanaway	4
3	Walkinshaw Andretti United (Holden Commodore ZB)		Erebus Motorsport (Holden Commodore ZB)		4
5	(Australia) Will Davison (Australia) Alex Davison	17	2	(Australia) Nick Percat (Australia) Warren Luff	6
5	Dick Johnson Racing (Ford Mustang S550)		Walkinshaw Andretti United (Holden Commodore ZB)		6
7	(New Zealand) Shane van Gisbergen (Australia) Garth Tander	97	5	(Australia) James Courtney (Australia) Zane Goddard	8
7	Triple Eight Race Engineering (Holden Commodore ZB)		Tickford Racing (Ford Mustang S550)		8
9	(Australia) Brodie Kostecki (Australia) David Russell	99	9	(Australia) Will Brown (Australia) Jack Perkins	10
9	Erebus Motorsport (Holden Commodore ZB)		Erebus Motorsport (Holden Commodore ZB)		10
11	(Australia) Anton de Pasquale (Australia) Tony D'Alberto	100	8	(New Zealand) Andre Heimgartner (Australia) Dale Wood	12
11	Dick Johnson Racing (Ford Mustang S550)		Brad Jones Racing (Holden Commodore ZB)		12
13	(Australia) James Golding (Australia) Dylan O'Keeffe	31	88	(Australia) Broc Feeney (Australia) Jamie Whincup	14
13	PremiAir Racing (Holden Commodore ZB)		Triple Eight Race Engineering (Holden Commodore ZB)		14
15	(Australia) Thomas Randle (Australia) Zak Best	55	888	(Australia) Craig Lowndes (Australia) Declan Fraser	16
15	Tickford Racing (Ford Mustang S550)		Triple Eight Race Engineering (Holden Commodore ZB)		16
17	(Australia) Jake Kostecki (Australia) Kurt Kostecki	56	26	(Australia) David Reynolds (Australia) Matt Campbell	18
17	Tickford Racing (Ford Mustang S550)		Grove Racing (Ford Mustang S550)		18
19	(Australia) Todd Hazelwood (Australia) Jayden Ojeda	35	20	(Australia) Scott Pye (Australia) Tyler Everingham	20
19	Matt Stone Racing (Holden Commodore ZB)		Charlie Schwerkolt Racing (Holden Commodore ZB)		20
21	(New Zealand) Chris Pither (Australia) Cameron Hill	22	96	(Australia) Macauley Jones (Australia) Jordan Boys	22
21	PremiAir Racing (Holden Commodore ZB)		Brad Jones Racing (Holden Commodore ZB)		22
23	(Australia) Mark Winterbottom (Australia) Michael Caruso	18	14	(Australia) Bryce Fullwood (Australia) Dean Fiore	24
23	Charlie Schwerkolt Racing (Holden Commodore ZB)		Brad Jones Racing (Holden Commodore ZB)		24
25	(Australia) Jack Le Brocq (Australia) Aaron Seton	34	118	(Australia) Matt Chahda (Australia) Jaylyn Robotham	26
25	Matt Stone Racing (Holden Commodore ZB)		Matt Chahda Motorsport (Holden Commodore ZB)		26
27	(Australia) Jack Smith (New Zealand) Jaxon Evans	4	3	(Australia) Tim Slade (Australia) Tim Blanchard	28
27	Brad Jones Racing (Holden Commodore ZB)		Blanchard Racing Team (Ford Mustang S550)		28

- Car #97 received a 3-place grid penalty for a causing a collision in Qualifying.

=== Race ===
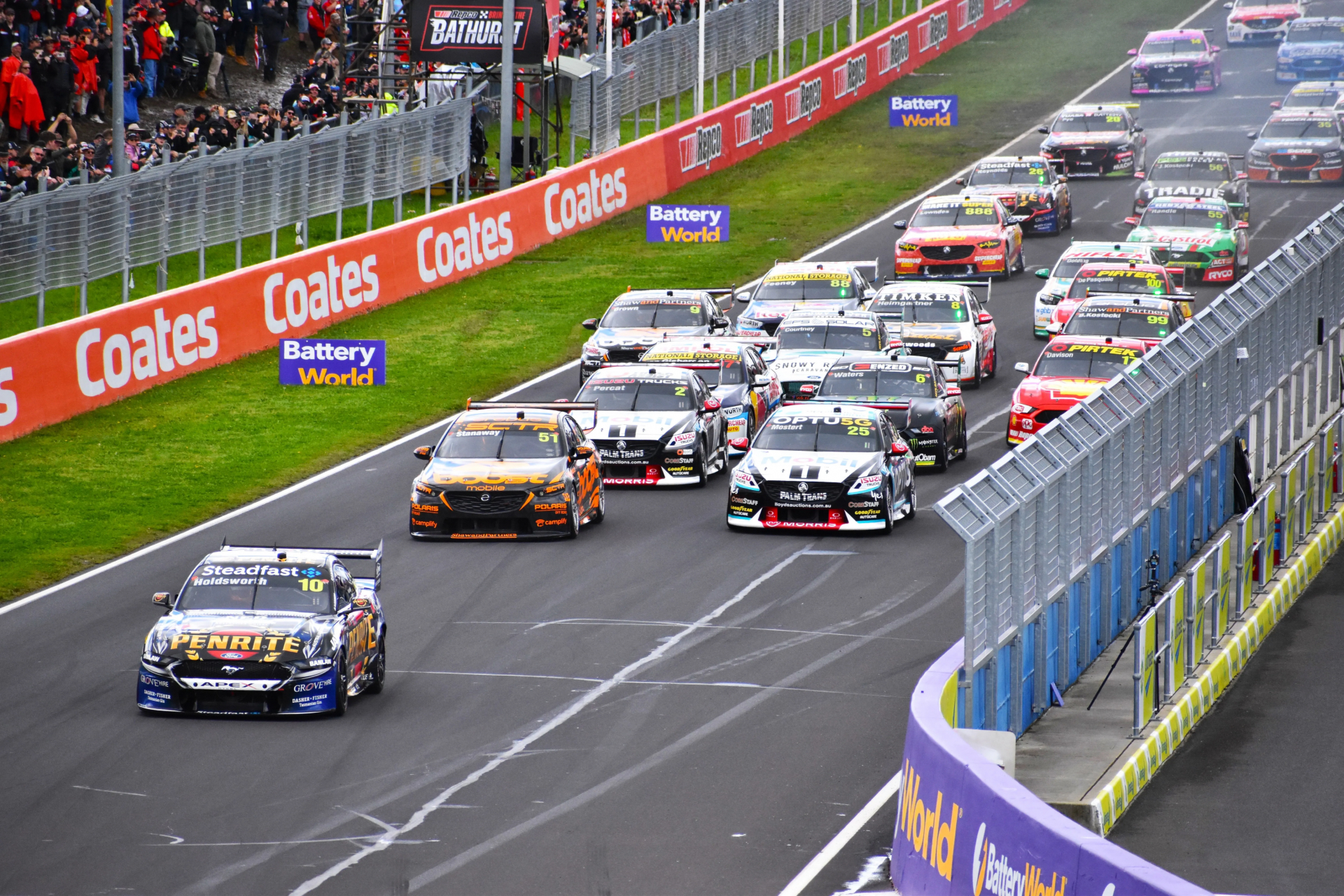
Race start.

Pos.	No.	Drivers	Team	Car	Laps	Time/Retired	Grid	Points
1	97	(New Zealand) Shane van Gisbergen (Australia) Garth Tander	Triple Eight Race Engineering	Holden Commodore ZB	161	6:41:53.7221	7	300
2	25	(Australia) Chaz Mostert (New Zealand) Fabian Coulthard	Walkinshaw Andretti United	Holden Commodore ZB	161	+1.0491	3	276
3	6	(Australia) Cameron Waters (Australia) James Moffat	Tickford Racing	Ford Mustang Mk.6	161	+5.9375	1	258
4	99	(Australia) Brodie Kostecki (Australia) David Russell	Erebus Motorsport	Holden Commodore ZB	161	+10.1072	9	240
5	88	(Australia) Broc Feeney (Australia) Jamie Whincup	Triple Eight Race Engineering	Holden Commodore ZB	161	+15.0353	14	222
6	10	(Australia) Lee Holdsworth (New Zealand) Matthew Payne	Grove Racing	Ford Mustang Mk.6	161	+15.7335	2	204
7	100	(Australia) Anton de Pasquale (Australia) Tony D'Alberto	Dick Johnson Racing	Ford Mustang Mk.6	161	+18.7610	11	192
8	888	(Australia) Craig Lowndes (Australia) Declan Fraser	Triple Eight Race Engineering	Holden Commodore ZB	161	+19.7005	16	180
9	14	(Australia) Bryce Fullwood (Australia) Dean Fiore	Brad Jones Racing	Holden Commodore ZB	161	+21.6730	24	168
10	9	(Australia) Will Brown (Australia) Jack Perkins	Erebus Motorsport	Holden Commodore ZB	161	+22.6232	10	156
11	51	(New Zealand) Richie Stanaway (New Zealand) Greg Murphy	Erebus Motorsport	Holden Commodore ZB	161	+23.6128	4	144
12	31	(Australia) James Golding (Australia) Dylan O'Keeffe	PremiAir Racing	Holden Commodore ZB	161	+23.7708	13	138
13	96	(Australia) Macauley Jones (Australia) Jordan Boys	Brad Jones Racing	Holden Commodore ZB	161	+24.6149	22	132
14	34	(Australia) Jack Le Brocq (Australia) Aaron Seton	Matt Stone Racing	Holden Commodore ZB	161	+32.5277	25	126
15	18	(Australia) Mark Winterbottom (Australia) Michael Caruso	Charlie Schwerkolt Racing	Holden Commodore ZB	161	+33.6027	23	120
16	20	(Australia) Scott Pye (Australia) Tyler Everingham	Charlie Schwerkolt Racing	Holden Commodore ZB	161	+34.3250	20	114
17	56	(Australia) Jake Kostecki (Australia) Kurt Kostecki	Tickford Racing	Ford Mustang Mk.6	161	+53.9962	17	108
18	118	(Australia) Matt Chahda (Australia) Jaylyn Robotham	Matt Chahda Motorsport	Holden Commodore ZB	161	+59.2961	26	102
19	3	(Australia) Tim Slade (Australia) Tim Blanchard	Blanchard Racing Team	Ford Mustang Mk.6	161	+1:04.6578	28	96
20	35	(Australia) Todd Hazelwood (Australia) Jayden Ojeda	Matt Stone Racing	Holden Commodore ZB	159	+2 laps	19	90
21	22	(New Zealand) Chris Pither (Australia) Cameron Hill	PremiAir Racing	Holden Commodore ZB	153	+8 laps	21	84
22	2	(Australia) Nick Percat (Australia) Warren Luff	Walkinshaw Andretti United	Holden Commodore ZB	148	+13 laps	6	78
DNF	17	(Australia) Will Davison (Australia) Alex Davison	Dick Johnson Racing	Ford Mustang Mk.6	141	Crash	5	
DNF	4	(Australia) Jack Smith (New Zealand) Jaxon Evans	Brad Jones Racing	Holden Commodore ZB	138	Crash damage	27	
DNF	8	(New Zealand) Andre Heimgartner (Australia) Dale Wood	Brad Jones Racing	Holden Commodore ZB	4	Crash	12	
DNF	26	(Australia) David Reynolds (Australia) Matthew Campbell	Grove Racing	Ford Mustang Mk.6	4	Crash	18	
DNF	5	(Australia) James Courtney (Australia) Zane Goddard	Tickford Racing	Ford Mustang Mk.6	4	Crash	8	
DNF	55	(Australia) Thomas Randle (Australia) Zak Best	Tickford Racing	Ford Mustang Mk.6	0	Crash	15	

== Broadcast ==
The event telecast was produced by Supercars Media and carried domestically by Fox Sports Australia (via Fox Sports 506 and Kayo Sports), a paid service which covered all sessions including support categories, and the Seven Network (via free-to-air channels 7HD and 7mate, as well as streaming on 7plus), which covered select sessions from midday Friday onwards. In New Zealand the sessions were shown by paid service Sky Sport, whilst internationally the broadcast was available through the series' pay-per-view service SuperView.

Fox Sports	Seven Network
Host: Jessica Yates; Booth: Neil Crompton, Mark Skaife; Pit-lane: Riana Crehan, Mark Larkham; Supports: Richard Craill, Matt Naulty, Chad Neylon	Presenters: Mark Beretta, Mel McLaughlin; Pundit: Jack Perkins; Roving: Emma Freedman, Brad Hodge, Chris Stubbs
