= 2015 Australian Formula Ford Series =

Motor racing competition

Seasons
- ← 2014 2016 →

The 2015 Australian Formula Ford Series was an Australian motor racing series open to Formula Ford and Formula Ford 1600 cars. The series was sanctioned by the Confederation of Australian Motor Sport (CAMS) with the Formula Ford Association Inc appointed as the Category Manager. It was the second Australian Formula Ford Series to be staged following the withdrawal of national championship status from the Australian Formula Ford Championship at the end of 2013.

The series was won by Cameron Hill, driving a Mygale SJ10a.

== Teams and drivers ==
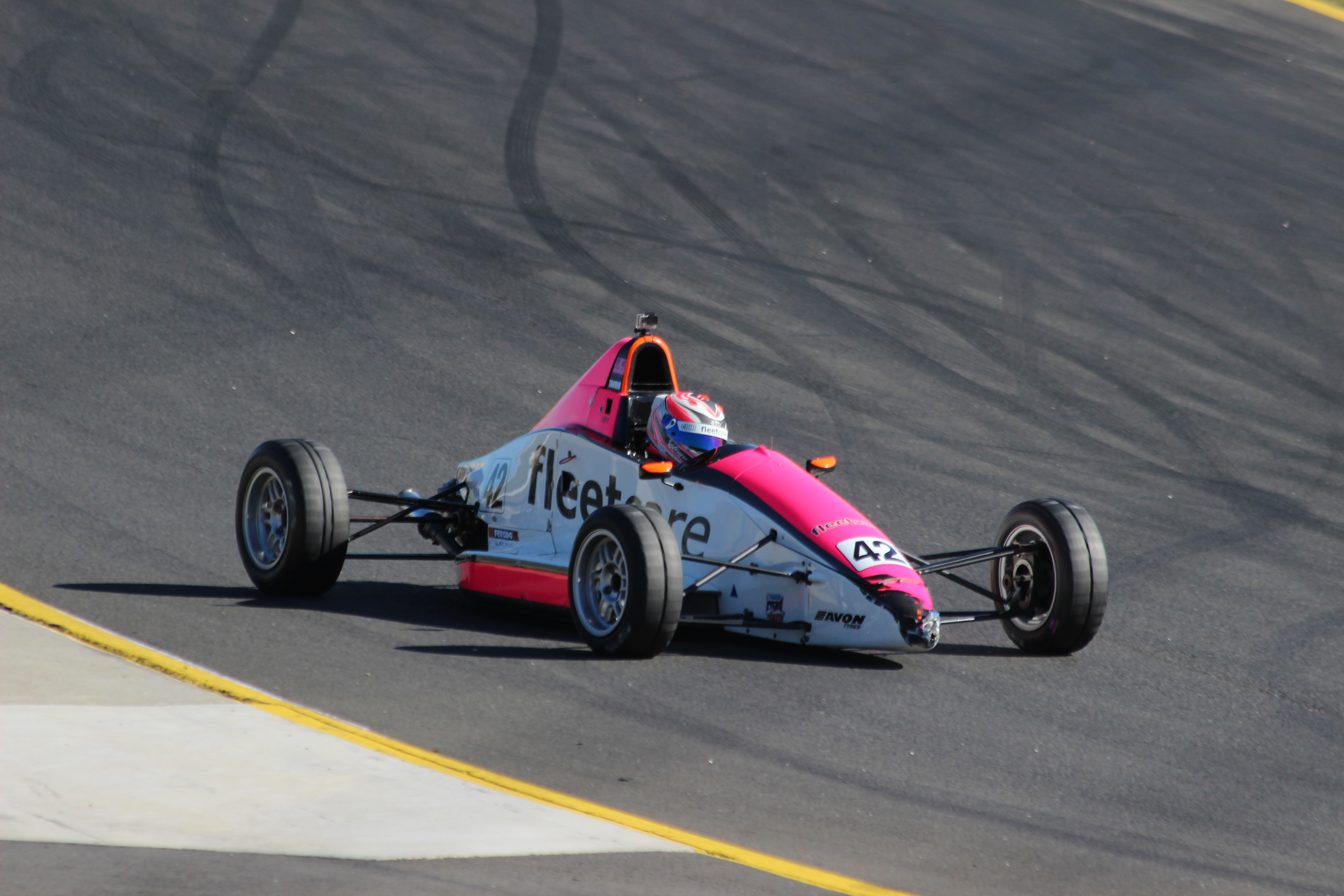
Leanne Tander (Mygale SJ10a) placed 10th in the series

Team	Chassis	No	Driver	Class	Rounds
Sonic Motor Racing Services	Mygale SJ13	2	(Australia) Thomas Maxwell		All
Sonic Motor Racing Services	Mygale SJ12	3	(Australia) Benjamin Reichstein		All
Sonic Motor Racing Services	Mygale SJ12	4	(Australia) Christian Morina		All
Sonic Motor Racing Services	Mygale SJ10a	10	(Australia) Hamish Hardeman		1
Infiniti Red Bull Racing Eyewear	Mygale SJ11	5	(Australia) Damon Strongman		1–3
OnTrack Accounts	Spectrum 06b	5	(Australia) Luke Ellery	K	6
OnTrack Accounts	Spectrum 06b	98	(Australia) Luke Ellery	K	4
Zsidy Racing	Spectrum 012	6	(Australia) Paul Zsidy		All
Zsidy Racing	Spectrum 014	38	(Australia) Mitch Martin		All
Synergy Motorsport	Mygale SJ07	7	(Australia) Cameron Walters	K	2–3, 5–6
Synergy Motorsport	Spectrum 012	12	(Australia) Andrew Kahl		5
Synergy Motorsport	Spectrum 014	20	(Australia) Caitlin Wood		1–3
Synergy Motorsport	Spectrum 014	99	(Australia) Ryan Pike		1
RaceFuels	Spectrum 010b	10	(Australia) Hamish Hardeman	K	3
RaceFuels	Spectrum 010	44	(Australia) David Harrington	K	3
Colin Hill Engineering	Mygale SJ10a	11	(Australia) Cameron Hill		All
James Corbett Art	Spectrum 014a	13	(Australia) James Corbett	K	5
Fagersta	Spectrum 014	21	(Australia) James Crozier		1–2, 4
4wd.net.au/Sincol LED	Mygale SJ09	22	(Australia) Luke King		6
The Racing Academy	Mygale SJ12a	23	(New Zealand) Taylor Cockerton		3
The Racing Academy	Mygale SJ12a	23	(Australia) Will Brown		5
Express Print	Mygale SJ12	24	(Australia) Nick Ellen		1–3
Dream Motorsport	Mygale SJ13a	26	(Australia) Luis Leeds		1–3, 5–6
Raceworks	Spectrum 014	31	(Australia) Jayden Ojeda		6
Jetcity	Spectrum 010	35	(Australia) Jack Atley	K	2
SJ Display Group	Mygale SJ12	39	(Australia) Jake Spencer		2–5
Anglo Australian Motorsport	Mygale SJ08	41	(Australia) Dan Holihan	K	6
TanderSport	Mygale SJ10a	42	(Australia) Leanne Tander		2–4, 6
Cameron Shields	Mygale SJ201	73	(Australia) Cameron Shields		6
Tim Hamilton	Spectrum 011b	87	(Australia) Tim Hamilton		4–5
Robert Power	Mygale SJ08a	92	(Australia) Robert Power	K	5–6
Adrian Lazzaro	Spectrum 011	95	(Australia) Adrian Lazzaro		3–6
Adrian Lazzaro	Spectrum 011	99	(Australia) Adrian Lazzaro		1
JohnWhiteEng/BrownEng	Spectrum 06b	96	(Australia) Jimmy Bailey	K	4–6

== Race calendar ==
The series was contested over six rounds with three races per round.

Round	Circuit	Dates	Map
1	(Victoria (state)) Sandown Raceway (Melbourne, Victoria)	27–29 March	2015 Australian Formula Ford Series is located in Australia
2	(Victoria (state)) Phillip Island Grand Prix Circuit (Phillip Island, Victoria)	22–24 May	2015 Australian Formula Ford Series is located in Australia
3	(Victoria (state)) Winton Motor Raceway (Benalla, Victoria)	12–14 June	2015 Australian Formula Ford Series is located in Australia
4	Sydney Motorsport Park (Eastern Creek, New South Wales)	3–5 July	2015 Australian Formula Ford Series is located in Australia
5	Queensland Raceway (Ipswich, Queensland)	7-9 August	2015 Australian Formula Ford Series is located in Australia
6	Wakefield Park Raceway (Goulburn, New South Wales)	16–18 October	2015 Australian Formula Ford Series is located in Australia

== Categories ==
Cars competed in two categories:

- Formula Ford - for Ford Duratec engined cars
- Formula Ford 1600 - for Ford Kent engined cars

== Results and standings ==
Points were awarded within each category on a 20-16-14-12-10-8-6-4-2-1 basis to the first ten finishers in each race. In addition, one point was awarded to the driver achieving the fastest lap time in qualifying in each category in each round.

=== Results ===
Rd	Race	Circuit	Pole position	Fastest lap	Winning driver	Winning team
1	1	(Victoria (state)) Sandown Raceway	(Australia) Hamish Hardeman	(Australia) Hamish Hardeman	(Australia) Hamish Hardeman	Sonic Motor Racing Services
1	2	(Victoria (state)) Sandown Raceway		(Australia) Christian Morina	(Australia) Christian Morina	Sonic Motor Racing Services
1	3	(Victoria (state)) Sandown Raceway		(Australia) Adrian Lazzaro	(Australia) Cameron Hill	Colin Hill Engineering
2	1	(Victoria (state)) Phillip Island Grand Prix Circuit	(Australia) Luis Leeds	(Australia) Thomas Maxwell	(Australia) Christian Morina	Sonic Motor Racing Services
2	2	(Victoria (state)) Phillip Island Grand Prix Circuit		(Australia) Cameron Hill	(Australia) Christian Morina	Sonic Motor Racing Services
2	3	(Victoria (state)) Phillip Island Grand Prix Circuit		(Australia) Christian Morina	(Australia) Luis Leeds	Dream Motorsport
3	1	(Victoria (state)) Winton Motor Raceway	(Australia) Cameron Hill	(Australia) Cameron Hill	(Australia) Cameron Hill	Colin Hill Engineering
3	2	(Victoria (state)) Winton Motor Raceway		(Australia) Cameron Hill	(Australia) Cameron Hill	Colin Hill Engineering
3	3	(Victoria (state)) Winton Motor Raceway		(Australia) Cameron Hill	(Australia) Cameron Hill	Colin Hill Engineering
4	1	(New South Wales) Sydney Motorsport Park	(Australia) Cameron Hill	(Australia) Cameron Hill	(Australia) Cameron Hill	Colin Hill Engineering
4	2	(New South Wales) Sydney Motorsport Park		(Australia) Cameron Hill	(Australia) Cameron Hill	Colin Hill Engineering
4	3	(New South Wales) Sydney Motorsport Park		(Australia) Cameron Hill	(Australia) Cameron Hill	Colin Hill Engineering
5	1	Queensland Raceway	(Australia) Cameron Hill	(Australia) Luis Leeds	(Australia) Luis Leeds	Dream Motorsport
5	2	Queensland Raceway		(Australia) Will Brown	(Australia) Cameron Hill	Colin Hill Engineering
5	3	Queensland Raceway		(Australia) Luis Leeds	(Australia) Cameron Hill	Colin Hill Engineering
6	1	(New South Wales) Wakefield Park Raceway	(Australia) Cameron Hill	(Australia) Cameron Hill	(Australia) Cameron Hill	Colin Hill Engineering
6	2	(New South Wales) Wakefield Park Raceway		(Australia) Thomas Maxwell	(Australia) Cameron Hill	Colin Hill Engineering
6	3	(New South Wales) Wakefield Park Raceway		(Australia) Cameron Hill	(Australia) Cameron Hill	Colin Hill Engineering

=== Championship standings ===
Pos.	Driver	(Victoria (state)) SAN			(Victoria (state)) PHI			(Victoria (state)) WIN			(New South Wales) SYD			(Queensland) QUE			(New South Wales) WAK			Pts
Pos.	Driver	R1	R2	R3	R1	R2	R3	R1	R2	R3	R1	R2	R3	R1	R2	R3	R1	R2	R3	Pts
1	(Australia) Cameron Hill	8	4	1	DNS	6	2	1	1	1	1	1	1	2	1	1	1	1	1	306
2	(Australia) Christian Morina	2	1	10	1	1	8	7	16	7	2	3	3	3	5	5	2	2	3	238
3	(Australia) Luis Leeds	Ret	Ret	7	5	2	1	5	2	2	4	2	2	1	2	2	9	10	10	211
4	(Australia) Thomas Maxwell	6	Ret	8	3	3	4	3	3	3	7	5	4	Ret	6	9	4	3	2	191
5	(Australia) Mitch Martin	4	5	3	7	10	7	4	13	8	5	6	11	6	7	6	5	4	4	177
6	(Australia) Jake Spencer	3	2	2	6	7	3	2	7	4	3	Ret	6	7	4	10				167
7	(Australia) Adrian Lazzaro	5	8	5	4	5	9	6	5	5	12	10	7	8	9	7	11	9	6	157
8	(Australia) Benjamin Reichstein	Ret	11	14	Ret	12	Ret	9	9	10	10	7	9	9	10	8	10	12	Ret	85
9	(Australia) Will Brown				2	4	5							5	3	3				78
10	(Australia) Leanne Tander				8	8	6	8	Ret	9	14	8	10				6	8	Ret	75
11	(Australia) Caitlin Wood	13	7	6	12	Ret	12	12	8	12	9	13	12							61
12	(Australia) Andrew Kahl										6	9	8	4	8	4				57
13	(Australia) Damon Strongman	9	9	11	9	9	11	10	4	Ret										56
14	(Australia) Paul Zsidy	10	Ret	15	13	13	14	13	14	16	15	14	15	12	11	11	12	Ret	8	56
15	(Australia) Luke King										8	4	5				7	6	11	56
16	(Australia) Nick Ellen	7	6	4	11	11	10	Ret	Ret	11										52
17	(Australia) Hamish Hardeman	1	3	12				15	10	14										39
18	(Australia) James Crozier	11	12	9	10	Ret	13				13	12	13							35
19	(Australia) Jayden Ojeda																3	5	7	34
20	(Australia) Cameron Shields																8	7	5	28
21	(New Zealand) Taylor Cockerton							11	6	6										25
22	(Australia) Tim Hamilton										11	11	14	10	12	13				25
23	(Australia) Ryan Pike	14	10	13																12
24	(Australia) Greg Holloway													11	16	12				12
Formula Ford 1600 (Kent) class
1	(Australia) Cameron Walters				15	15	16	16	Ret	17	17	16	17	13	13	14	13	11	9	239
2	(Australia) Jimmy Bailey	12	13	Ret	16	16	17	18	17	Ret	18	17	19	16	17	17				205
3	(Australia) Luke Ellery				14	14	15	14	11	13	16	15	16				14	DSQ	Ret	194
4	(Australia) Robert Power													15	15	15	16	14	13	84
5	(Australia) Dan Hoilhan										19	18	18				15	13	12	82
6	(Australia) Hamish Hardeman																			52
7	(Australia) James Corbett													14	14	16				47
8	(Australia) David Harrington							17	12	15										40
9	(Australia) James Garley																			23
10	(Australia) Jack Atley				Ret	17	Ret													12
Pos.	Driver	R1	R2	R3	R1	R2	R3	R1	R2	R3	R1	R2	R3	R1	R2	R3	R1	R2	R3	Pts
Pos.	Driver	(Victoria (state)) SAN			(Victoria (state)) PHI			(Victoria (state)) WIN			(New South Wales) SYD			(Queensland) QUE			(New South Wales) WAK			Pts
