= Dylan O'Keeffe =

Australian racing driver

- Nationality: Australian
- Born: Dylan Christopher O'Keeffe; 4 February 1998 (age 28) Melbourne, Victoria, Australia

Porsche Carrera Cup Australia Championship career
- Current team: GWR Australia / RAM Motorsport
- Categorisation: FIA Silver
- Car number: 1
- Former teams: Ashley Seward Motorsport; Garry Rogers Motorsport
- Starts: 171
- Wins: 8
- Podiums: 57
- Poles: 8
- Fastest laps: 4
- Best finish: 1st in 2025

Previous series
- 2015 2016-18 2019: Porsche GT3 Cup Challenge Australia; Porsche Carrera Cup Australia Championship

Championship titles
- 2025: Porsche Carrera Cup Australia

Supercars Championship career
- Current team: Matt Stone Racing
- Championships: 0
- Races: 8
- Wins: 0
- Podiums: 0
- Pole positions: 0

Dylan Christopher O'Keeffe (born 4 February 1998) is an Australian racing driver and the reigning Porsche Carrera Cup Australia champion, having won the 2025 title with GWR Australia / RAM Motorsport. He has also competed in categories including Porsche GT3 Cup Challenge Australia, TCR Australia Touring Car Series and the Supercars Championship.

== Biography ==
O'Keeffe started his career in karting before making his car-racing debut in the Victorian-based Porsche 944 Challenge in 2014. O'Keeffe attended St Bede's College (Mentone) during his secondary education. Dylan has a sister called Olivia.

=== Porsche GT3 Cup Challenge ===
O'Keeffe competed in the Porsche GT3 Cup Challenge in 2015, driving for Ashley Seward Motorsport. He finished second overall in the standings with one race win and 12 top-three finishes.

=== Porsche Carrera Cup ===
For the 2016 racing season, O'Keeffe progressed to the Porsche Carrera Cup, remaining with the Ashley Seward Motorsport team. He finished tenth in the points, with a best race result of fourth at the Hidden Valley round. He remained in Carrera Cup for the 2017 season, achieving top-three race finishes at Adelaide and Phillip Island, before recording a season-best second place at Malaysia's Sepang circuit. He finished sixth in the 2017 series standings.

In the 2018 Carrera Cup, O'Keeffe recorded his first race win at Sydney Motorsport Park and maiden round win at Darwin, finishing third in the standings.

In both 2017 and '18, O'Keeffe represented Australia at the Porsche Motorsport Junior Programme Shootout.

In 2022, O'Keeffe returned to Carrera Cup, driving for the Garth Walden Racing Australia team. He finished fourth in the 2022 and 2023 series standings, and third in the 2024 series standings. In 2025, O'Keeffe won the Porsche Carrera Cup Australia championship with GWR Australia / RAM Motorsport, finishing 43 points ahead of Harri Jones. O'Keeffe won three races during the season, with superior consistency at the Bathurst and Adelaide rounds sealing the title — his first championship and the first Carrera Cup title for GWR Australia. GWR Australia / RAM Motorsport also won the 2025 Teams Championship. O'Keeffe is defending the title in 2026, carrying the #1 plate.

=== Bathurst 12 Hour ===
O'Keeffe made his Bathurst 12 Hour debut in 2017, winning Class B and finishing 15th outright in a Steven Richards Motorsport Porsche. He returned to the event in 2018, driving an Audi R8 but the car was classified as a non-finisher.

O'Keeffe made further Bathurst 12 Hour starts in 2019 (driving a MARC car), 2020 and 2023 (driving an Audi R8). He achieved his second Bathurst 12 Hour class win in 2023, alongside Daniel Gaunt and Andrew Fawcet. In 2026, O'Keeffe won the Pro-Am class (finishing 13th outright) alongside Garth Walden and Brett Hobson in a Mercedes-Benz AMG GT3 entered by GWR Australia, marking his third career Bathurst 12 Hour class victory.

=== Super2 Series ===
For the 2019 racing season, O'Keeffe was signed by Garry Rogers Motorsport to drive in the Super2 Series, replacing Chris Pither

=== Supercars Championship ===
At the 2019 Gold Coast 600, O'Keeffe made his Supercars Championship racing debut for Garry Rogers Motorsport after Richie Stanaway was stood down from Race 27 for disciplinary reasons.

== Career results ==
Season	Series	Position	Vehicle	Team
2014	Victorian Porsche 944 Challenge	18th	Porsche 944	Dylan O'Keeffe
2015	Porsche GT3 Cup Challenge	**2nd**	Porsche 911 GT3	Ashley Seward Motorsport
2016	Porsche Carrera Cup Australia	10th	Porsche 911 GT3	Ashley Seward Motorsport
2017	Porsche Carrera Cup Australia	6th	Porsche 911 GT3	Ashley Seward Motorsport
2018	Porsche Carrera Cup Australia	**3rd**	Porsche 911 GT3	Ashley Seward Motorsport
2019	TCR Australia Touring Car Series	5th	Alfa Romeo Giulietta	Ashley Seward Motorsport
2019	Dunlop Super2 Series	5th	Holden VF Commodore	Garry Rogers Motorsport
2019	Virgin Australia Supercars Championship	53rd	Holden ZB Commodore	Garry Rogers Motorsport
2019	Porsche Carrera Cup Australia	23rd	Porsche 911 GT3	Ashley Seward Motorsport
2020	Virgin Australia Supercars Championship	36th	Ford Mustang GT	Kelly Racing
2021	TCR Australia Touring Car Series	15th	Renault Mégane R.S TCR	Renault Sport GRM
2021	Supercars Championship	38th	Team Sydney	Holden ZB Commodore
2022	Porsche Carrera Cup Australia	4th	Porsche 911 GT3 Cup Type 992	RAM Motorsport
2022	TCR Australia Touring Car Series	9th	Peugeot 308 TCR	Garry Rogers Motorsport
2022	Supercars Championship	41st	Holden ZB Commodore	PremiAir Racing
2023	Porsche Carrera Cup Australia	4th	Porsche 911 GT3 Cup Type 992	RAM Motorsport
2023	Supercars Championship	39th	Camaro ZL1-1LE	PremiAir Racing
2024	Porsche Carrera Cup Australia	**3rd**	Porsche 911 GT3 Cup Type 992	RAM Motorsport
2024	TCR Australia	4th	Lynk & Co 03 TCR	Ashley Seward Motorsport
2024	Supercars Championship	47th	Camaro ZL1-1LE	Matt Stone Racing
2025	Porsche Carrera Cup Australia	**1st**	Porsche 911 GT3 Cup Type 992	RAM Motorsport
2026	Porsche Carrera Cup Australia	Season in progress	Porsche 911 GT3 Cup Type 992	GWR Australia / RAM Motorsport

=== Complete Australian Carrera Cup Championship results ===
(key) (Races in bold indicate pole position – 1 point awarded all races) (Races in italics indicate fastest lap) (* signifies that driver lead feature race for at least one lap – 1 point awarded)

Year	Team	Car	1	2	3	4	5	6	7	8	9	10	11	12	13	14	15	16	17	18	19	20	21	22	23	24	25	Pos	Pts
2016	Dexion Supply Centre	Porsche 911 GT3 Cup	ADE; R1; DNS	ADE; R2; 13	ADE; R3; Ret	ALB; R4; 11	ALB; R5; 15	ALB; R6; 11	ALB; R7; 11	SMP; R8; 18	SMP; R9; 10	HID; R10; 4	HID; R11; 5	HID; R12; 9	SMP; R13; 7	SMP; R14; 9	SAN; R15; Ret	SAN; R16; 8	SAN; R17; 6	BAT; R18; 9	BAT; R19; 11	BAT; R20; 8	SUR; R21; 8	SUR; R22; Ret	SUR; R23; 10			10th	435
2017	Ashley Seward Motorsport	Porsche 911 GT3 Cup	ADE; R1; 7	ADE; R2; 5	ADE; R3; 3	ALB; R4; 4	ALB; R5; 6	ALB; R6; 4	ALB; R7; 7	PHI; R8; 3	**PHI**; **R9**; **Ret**	HID; R10; 4	HID; R11; 4	HID; R12; 7	SEP; R13; 3	SEP; R14; 2	SAN; R15; 9	SAN; R16; 8	SAN; R17; 5	BAT; R18; 6	BAT; R19; 7	BAT; R20; 9	SUR; R21; 4	SUR; R22; 6	SUR; R23; 4			6th	855
2018	Dexion Supply Centre	Porsche 911 GT3 Cup	ADE; R1; 3	ADE; R2; 3	ADE; R3; 5	ALB; R4; 7	ALB; R5; 11	ALB; R6; 7	ALB; R7; 2	PHI; R8; 3	PHI; R9; 3	HID; R10; 3	HID; R11; 2	HID; R12; 2	SMP; R13; 1	SMP; R14; 3	BEN; R15; 5	BEN; R16; 5	BEN; R17; 7	BAT; R18; 8	BAT; R19; 5	BAT; R20; 2	SUR; R21; Ret	SUR; R22; 19	SUR; R23; 11			**3rd**	**957**
2019	Ashley Seward Motorsport	Porsche 911 GT3 Cup	ADE; R1	ADE; R2	ADE; R3	MEL; R4; 2	MEL; R5; Ret	MEL; R6; 13	MEL; R7; 9	PHI; R8	PHI; R9	PHI; R10	HID; R10	HID; R11	HID; R12	TOW; R13	TOW; R14	TOW; R15	BEN; R16	BEN; R17	BEN; R18	BAT; R19	BAT; R20	BAT; R21	SUR; R22	SUR; R23	SUR; R24	23rd	69
2022	Garth Walden Motorsport	Porsche 992 GT3 Cup	ALB; R1; 17	ALB; R2; 13	ALB; R3; 7	ALB; R4; 4	**WIN**; **R5**; **2**	WIN; R6; 3	WIN; R7; 4	HID; R8; 4	HID; R9; 3	HID; R10; 3	TOW; R11; 12	TOW; R12; 13	TOW; R13; 9	BEN; R14; 2	BEN; R15; 2	BEN; R16; 3	SAN; R17; 1	**SAN**; **R18**; **Ret**	SAN; R19; 15	BAT; R20; 3	BAT; R21; C	BAT; R22; C	SUR; R23; 5	SUR; R24; 4	SUR; R25; 5	4th	767
2023	RAM Motorsport	Porsche 992 GT3 Cup	ALB; R1; C	ALB; R2; Ret	ALB; R3; 11	HID; R4; 28	HID; R5; 8	HID; R6; 8	TOW; R7; 9	TOW; R8; 7	TOW; R9; 13	BEN; R10; 3	BEN; R11; 6	BEN; R12; Ret	**SAN**; **R13**; **1**	**SAN**; **R14**; **2**	SAN; R15; 1	BAT; R16; 4	BAT; R17; 8	BAT; R18; 6	SUR; R19; 2	SUR; R20; 3	SUR; R21; 4	ADE; R22; 9	ADE; R23; 8	ADE; R24; 2		4th	751
2024	RAM Motorsport	Porsche 992 GT3 Cup	ALB; R1; 7	ALB; R2; 6	ALB; R3; 8	TAU; R4; 5	TAU; R5; 5	TAU; R6; 4	HID; R7; 8	HID; R8; 3	HID; R9; 5	SMP; R10; 2	SMP; R11; 4	SMP; R12; 2	SAN; R13; 2	SAN; R14; 4	SAN; R15; 2	BAT; R16; 7	BAT; R17; 9	BAT; R18; 12	SUR; R19; 2	SUR; R20; 6	SUR; R21; 5	ADE; R22; 3	ADE; R23; 11	ADE; R24; 2		**3rd**	**915**
2025	RAM Motorsport	Porsche 992 GT3 Cup	SMP; R1; 3	SMP; R2; 3	SMP; R3; 3	ALB; R4; 2	ALB; R5; 5	ALB; R6; 2	HID; R7; 1	HID; R8; 1	HID; R9; 1	QLD; R10; 3	QLD; R11; 7	QLD; R12; 5	BEN; R13; 3	BEN; R14; 5	BEN; R15; 3	BAT; R16; 2	BAT; R17; 2	BAT; R18; 2	SUR; R19; C	SUR; R20; Ret	SUR; R21; 10	ADE; R22; 5	ADE; R23; 4	ADE; R24; 7		1st	1024

=== Complete Super2 Series results ===
(key) (Round results only)

Super2 Series results
Year	Team	No.	Car	1	2	3	4	5	6	7	8	9	10	11	12	13	14	Position	Points
2019	Garry Rogers Motorsport	44	Holden VF Commodore	ADE; R1; 9	ADE; R2; 8	ADE; R3; 11	BAR; R4; 10	BAR; R5; 15	TOW; R6; 12	TOW; R7; 14	QLD; R8; 9	QLD; R9; 5	BAT; R10; 6	SAN; R11; 3	SAN; R12; Ret	NEW; R13; 7	NEW; R14; 9	5th	1142

=== Supercars Championship results ===
Supercars results
Year	Team	No.	Car	1	2	3	4	5	6	7	8	9	10	11	12	13	14	15	16	17	18	19	20	21	22	23	24	25	26	27	28	29	30	31	32	33	34	Position	Points
2019	Garry Rogers Motorsport	33	Holden ZB Commodore	ADE; R1	ADE; R2	MEL; R3	MEL; R4	MEL; R5	MEL; R6	SYM; R7	SYM; R8	PHI; R9	PHI; R10	BAR; R11	BAR; R12	WIN; R13	WIN; R14	HID; R15	HID; R16	TOW; R17	TOW; R18	QLD; R19	QLD; R20	BEN; R21	BEN; R22	PUK; R23	PUK; R24	BAT; R25	SUR; R26	SUR; R27; 18	SAN; QR	SAN; R28	NEW; R29	NEW; R30				53rd	81
2020	Kelly Racing	7	Ford Mustang GT	ADE; R1	ADE; R2	MEL; R3	MEL; R4	MEL; R5	MEL; R6	SMP1; R7	SMP1; R8	SMP1; R9	SMP2; R10	SMP2; R11	SMP2; R12	HID1; R13	HID1; R14	HID1; R15	HID2; R16	HID2; R17	HID2; R18	TOW1; R19	TOW1; R20	TOW1; R21	TOW2; R22	TOW2; R23	TOW2; R24	BEN1; R25	BEN1; R26	BEN1; R27	BEN2; R28	BEN2; R29	BEN2; R30	BAT; R31; 11				36th	144
2021	Team Sydney	22	Holden ZB Commodore	BAT1; R1	BAT1; R2	SAN; R3	SAN; R4	SAN; R5	SYM; R6	SYM; R7	SYM; R8	BEN; R9	BEN; R10	BEN; R11	HID; R12	HID; R13	HID; R14	TOW1; R15	TOW1; R16	TOW2; R17	TOW2; R18	TOW2; R19	SMP1; R20	SMP1; R21	SMP1; R22	SMP2; R23	SMP2; R24	SMP2; R25	SMP3; R26	SMP3; R27	SMP3; R28	SMP4; R29; PO	SMP4; R30; PO	BAT2; R31; 14				38th	126
2022	PremiAir Racing	31	Holden ZB Commodore	SYD; R1	SYD; R2	SYM; R6	SYM; R7	SYM; R8	MEL; R6	MEL; R7	MEL; R8	MEL; R9	WAN; R10	WAN; R11	WAN; R12	WIN; R13	WIN; R14	WIN; R15	HID; R16	HID; R17	HID; R18	TOW; R19	TOW; R20	BEN; R21	BEN; R22	BEN; R23	SAN; R24; PO	SAN; R25; PO	SAN; R26; PO	PUK; R27	PUK; R28	PUK; R29	BAT; R30; 12	SUR; R31	SUR; R32	ADE; R33	ADE; R34	41st	138
2023	PremiAir Racing	31	Camaro ZL1	NEW; R1	NEW; R2	MEL; R3	MEL; R4	MEL; R5	MEL; R6	BAR; R7	BAR; R8	BAR; R9	SYM; R10	SYM; R11	SYM; R12	HID; R13	HID; R14	HID; R15	TOW; R16	TOW; R17	SMP; R18	SMP; R19	BEN; R20	BEN; R21	BEN; R22	SAN; R23; 15	BAT; R24; 10	SUR; R25	SUR; R26	ADE; R27	ADE; R28							39th	276
2024	Matt Stone Racing	10	Camaro ZL1	BAT1; R1	BAT1; R2	MEL; R3	MEL; R4	MEL; R5	MEL; R6	TAU; R7	TAU; R8	BAR; R9	BAR; R10	HID; R11	HID; R12	TOW; R13	TOW; R14	SMP; R15	SMP; R16	BEN; R17	BEN; R18	SAN; R19; 23	BAT; R20; 17	SUR; R21	SUR; R22	ADE; R23	ADE; R24											47th	180

=== Complete Bathurst 1000 results ===
Year	Team	Car	Co-driver	Position	Laps
2020	Kelly Racing	Ford Mustang S550	(New Zealand) Andre Heimgartner	11th	161
2021	Tekno Autosports	Holden Commodore ZB	(Australia) Garry Jacobson	14th	161
2022	PremiAir Racing	Holden Commodore ZB	(Australia) James Golding	12th	161
2023	PremiAir Racing	Chevrolet Camaro Mk.6	(Australia) James Golding	10th	161
2024	Matt Stone Racing	Chevrolet Camaro Mk.6	(Australia) Nick Percat	17th	161

=== TCR Australia results ===
TCR Australia results
Year	Team	Car	1	2	3	4	5	6	7	8	9	10	11	12	13	14	15	16	17	18	19	20	21	Position	Points
2019	Ashley Seward Motorsport	Alfa Romeo Giulietta Veloce TCR	SMP; R1; 4	SMP; R2; 2	SMP; R3; 2	PHI; R4; 1	PHI; R5; 1	PHI; R6; Ret	BEN; R7; Ret	BEN; R8; 11	BEN; R9; 11	QLD; R10; 2	QLD; R11; 1	QLD; R12; 1	WIN; R13; 3	WIN; R14; 15	WIN; R15; 8	SAN; R16; 8	SAN; R17; 8	SAN; R18; 11	BEN; R19; **DNS**	BEN; R20; Ret	BEN; R21; DNS	5th	483
2021	Renault Sport GRM	Renault Mégane R.S TCR	SYM; R1; 14	SYM; R2; 11	SYM; R3; 10	PHI; R4; 15	PHI; R5; 14	PHI; R6; 7	BAT; R7; Ret	BAT; R8; 18	BAT; R9; 14	SMP; R10; **10**	SMP; R11; 6	SMP; R12; 17	BAT; R19; 10	BAT; R20; Ret	BAT; R21; 13							15th	342
2022	Garry Rogers Motorsport	Peugeot 308 TCR	SYM; R1; 9	SYM; R2; 7	SYM; R3; Ret	PHI; R4; 3	PHI; R5; 5	PHI; R6; 4	BAT; R7; 3	BAT; R8; 5	BAT; R9; 3	SMP; R10; 4	SMP; R11; 7	SMP; R12; 5	QLD; R13; 11	QLD; R14; Ret	QLD; R15; 11	SAN; R16; Ret	SAN; R17; 7	SAN; R18; 8	BAT; R19; 2	BAT; R20; C	BAT; R21; 16	9th	577
2024	Ashley Seward Motorsport	Lynk & Co 03 TCR	SAN; R1; 9	SAN; R2; 9	SAN; R3; 9	SYM; R4; 10	SYM; R5; 1	SYM; R6; 3	PHI; R7; 3	PHI; R8; Ret	PHI; R9; 8	BND; R10; 4	BND; R11; 8	BND; R12; 5	QLD; R13; Ret	QLD; R14; 7	QLD; R15; 6	SMP; R19; 3	SMP; R20; 2	SMP; R21; 2	BAT; R22; 2	BAT; R23; 4	BAT; R24; 1	4th	654

=== Complete World Touring Car Cup results ===
(key) (Races in bold indicate pole position) (Races in italics indicate fastest lap)

Year	Team	Car	1	2	3	4	5	6	7	8	9	10	11	12	13	14	15	16	DC	Points
2020	Vuković Motorsport	Renault Mégane R.S TCR	BEL; 1; 13	BEL; 2; 12	GER; 1	GER; 2	SVK; 1	SVK; 2	SVK; 3	HUN; 1	HUN; 2	HUN; 3	ESP; 1	ESP; 2	ESP; 3	ARA; 1	ARA; 2	ARA; 3	NC‡	0‡

^{‡} As O'Keeffe was a Wildcard entry, he was ineligible to score points.

=== Complete Bathurst 12 Hour results ===
Year	Team	Co-drivers	Car	Class	Laps	Pos.	Class pos.
2017	(Australia) Steven Richards Motorsport	(Australia) Dean Grant (Australia) Xavier West (Australia) David Wall	Porsche 991 GT3 Cup	B	274	15th	**1st**
2018	(Australia) Team ASR	(Australia) Ash Samadi (New Zealand) Daniel Gaunt	Audi R8 LMS	AAM	66	DNF	DNF
2019	MARC Cars Australia	(Australia) Geoff Taunton (Australia) Jason Busk	MARC Ford Focus V8	Invitational	136	DNF	DNF
2020	(Australia) Tony Bates Racing	(Australia) Tony Bates (Australia) Geoff Emery (Australia) Max Twigg	Audi R8 LMS Evo	GT3 Silver	84	DNF	DNF
2023	(New Zealand) Myland Team IMS	(New Zealand) Andrew Fawcet (New Zealand) Daniel Gaunt	Audi R8 LMS Evo II	GT3 Silver	136	12th	**1st**
2026	GWR Australia	(Australia) Garth Walden (Australia) Brett Hobson	Mercedes-Benz AMG GT3	Pro-Am		13th	**1st**

=== Complete Bathurst 6 Hour results ===
Year	Team	Co-drivers	Car	Class	Laps	Pos.	Class pos.
2022	GWR Australia	(Australia) Mike Sheargold (Australia) Oliver Shannon	Mercedes-Benz A45 AMG	A1	130	4th	**1st**
2023	(Australia) RAM Motorsport	(Australia) Mike Sheargold (Australia) Brett Hobson	Mercedes-Benz A45 AMG	A1	112	10th	**2nd**

== Honours ==
- 2025 Porsche Carrera Cup Australia — Champion
- 2025 Porsche Carrera Cup Australia Teams Championship — GWR Australia / RAM Motorsport
- 2026 Bathurst 12 Hour — Pro-Am Class Winner
