= 2018 Porsche Carrera Cup Australia =

Australian motor racing competition

The 2018 CAMS Porsche Wilson Security Carrera Cup Australia Series was an Australian motor racing competition for Porsche 911 GT3 Cup cars. The series, which was the 14th Porsche Carrera Cup Australia, commenced on 1 March at the Adelaide Street Circuit and finish on 21 October at the Surfers Paradise Street Circuit after eight rounds. 2018 saw the introduction of the Porsche 911 GT3 Cup type 991.II model to the series.

The series was won by Jaxon Evans.

== Teams and drivers ==
Team	Class	No.	Driver	Rounds
Wall Racing	P	1	(Australia) David Wall	All
Wall Racing	PA	5	(Australia) Greg Taylor	1–4
Wall Racing	PA	5	(Australia) Shane Smollen	5
Wall Racing	P	18	(Australia) James Moffat	All
Wall Racing	PA	50	(Australia) David Stevens	7-8
Grove Motorsport	PA	4	(Australia) Stephen Grove	All
Grove Motorsport	P	911	(New Zealand) Earl Bamber	8
McElrea Racing	PA	6	(New Zealand) Tim Miles	All
McElrea Racing	P	7	(New Zealand) Jaxon Evans	All
McElrea Racing	P	12	(Australia) Adam Garwood	4-8
McElrea Racing	PA	19	(Australia) Anthony Gilbertson	All
Porsche Centre Melbourne	P	8	(Australia) Nick McBride	All
Porsche Centre Melbourne	PA	9	(Australia) Marc Cini	All
Porsche Centre Melbourne	PA	808	(Australia) John Steffensen	1–4
Garwood Motorsport	P	12	(Australia) Adam Garwood	1–3
Buik Motorworks	PA	13	(Australia) Sam Shahin	1–3, 6–8
Sonic Motor Racing Services	P	14	(Australia) Peter Major	All
Sonic Motor Racing Services	P	77	(Australia) Michael Almond	All
Sonic Motor Racing Services	P	100	(Australia) Dale Wood	All
Sonic Motor Racing Services	PA	131	(Australia) Graham Williams	All
Sonic Motor Racing Services	P	777	(Australia) Jordan Love	All
Volante Rosso Motorsport	P	15	(Australia) Josh Hunt	1–5, 7, 8
Volante Rosso Motorsport	PA	15	(Australia) Benjamin Stack	6
Agas National	PA	20	(Australia) Adrian Flack	All
Ashley Seward Motorsport	PA	22	(Australia) Dean Cook	All
Ashley Seward Motorsport	PA	80	(Australia) Max Twigg	1–3, 6
Ashley Seward Motorsport	P	88	(Australia) Dylan O'Keeffe	All
Ashley Seward Motorsport	P	888	(Australia) Leanne Tander	1
Ashley Seward Motorsport	P	888	(Australia) Alex Davison	2–3
Ashley Seward Motorsport	P	888	(Australia) Glen Wood	4–7
JBS Australia	PA	23	(Australia) Roger Lago	1–7
Garth Walden Racing	PA	35	(Australia) Indiran Padayachee	1–3, 5–8
Cameron Hill Racing	P	111	(Australia) Cameron Hill	1, 3–8

== Race calendar ==
Round		Circuit	Date	Pole position	Fastest lap	Winning driver	Winning team	Round winner
1	R1	Adelaide Street Circuit (Adelaide, South Australia)	1–4 March	(New Zealand) Jaxon Evans	(Australia) Michael Almond	(Australia) Dale Wood	Sonic Motor Racing Services	(New Zealand) Jaxon Evans
1	R2	Adelaide Street Circuit (Adelaide, South Australia)	1–4 March		(Australia) Dale Wood	(New Zealand) Jaxon Evans	McElrea Racing	(New Zealand) Jaxon Evans
1	R3	Adelaide Street Circuit (Adelaide, South Australia)	1–4 March		(New Zealand) Jaxon Evans	(New Zealand) Jaxon Evans	McElrea Racing	(New Zealand) Jaxon Evans
2	R1	(Victoria (state)) Albert Park Grand Prix Circuit (Melbourne, Victoria)	22–25 March	(Australia) Nick McBride	(New Zealand) Jaxon Evans	(Australia) Dale Wood	Sonic Motor Racing Services	(New Zealand) Jaxon Evans
2	R2	(Victoria (state)) Albert Park Grand Prix Circuit (Melbourne, Victoria)	22–25 March		(Australia) Alex Davison	(Australia) Dale Wood	Sonic Motor Racing Services	(New Zealand) Jaxon Evans
2	R3	(Victoria (state)) Albert Park Grand Prix Circuit (Melbourne, Victoria)	22–25 March		(Australia) Alex Davison	(Australia) Dale Wood	Sonic Motor Racing Services	(New Zealand) Jaxon Evans
2	R4	(Victoria (state)) Albert Park Grand Prix Circuit (Melbourne, Victoria)	22–25 March		(New Zealand) Jaxon Evans	(New Zealand) Jaxon Evans	McElrea Racing	(New Zealand) Jaxon Evans
3	R1	(Victoria (state)) Phillip Island Grand Prix Circuit (Phillip Island, Victoria)	20–22 April	(Australia) Dale Wood	(Australia) Alex Davison	(Australia) Dale Wood	Sonic Motor Racing Services	(Australia) Dale Wood
3	R2	(Victoria (state)) Phillip Island Grand Prix Circuit (Phillip Island, Victoria)	20–22 April		(Australia) Alex Davison	(Australia) Dale Wood	Sonic Motor Racing Services	(Australia) Dale Wood
4	R1	Hidden Valley Raceway (Darwin, Northern Territory)	15–17 June	(Australia) David Wall	(Australia) David Wall	(Australia) David Wall	Wall Racing	(Australia) Dylan O'Keeffe
4	R2	Hidden Valley Raceway (Darwin, Northern Territory)	15–17 June		(New Zealand) Jaxon Evans	(New Zealand) Jaxon Evans	McElrea Racing	(Australia) Dylan O'Keeffe
4	R3	Hidden Valley Raceway (Darwin, Northern Territory)	15–17 June		(New Zealand) Jaxon Evans	(Australia) James Moffat	Wall Racing	(Australia) Dylan O'Keeffe
5	R1	Sydney Motorsport Park (Sydney, New South Wales)	3–4 August	(Australia) David Wall	(Australia) Dylan O'Keeffe	(Australia) Dylan O'Keeffe	Ashley Seward Motorsport	(Australia) Dylan O'Keeffe
5	R2	Sydney Motorsport Park (Sydney, New South Wales)	3–4 August		(Australia) Michael Almond	(Australia) Jordan Love	Sonic Motor Racing Services	(Australia) Dylan O'Keeffe
6	R1	The Bend Motorsport Park (Tailem Bend, South Australia)	24–26 August	(Australia) James Moffat	(Australia) David Wall	(Australia) Michael Almond	Sonic Motor Racing Services	(Australia) Michael Almond
6	R2	The Bend Motorsport Park (Tailem Bend, South Australia)	24–26 August		(Australia) Jordan Love	(Australia) Michael Almond	Sonic Motor Racing Services	(Australia) Michael Almond
6	R3	The Bend Motorsport Park (Tailem Bend, South Australia)	24–26 August		(Australia) Dale Wood	(Australia) Dale Wood	Sonic Motor Racing Services	(Australia) Michael Almond
7	R1	Mount Panorama Circuit (Bathurst, New South Wales)	4–7 October	(Australia) James Moffat	(Australia) David Wall	(Australia) David Wall	Wall Racing	(New Zealand) Jaxon Evans
7	R2	Mount Panorama Circuit (Bathurst, New South Wales)	4–7 October		(New Zealand) Jaxon Evans	(New Zealand) Jaxon Evans	McElrea Racing	(New Zealand) Jaxon Evans
7	R3	Mount Panorama Circuit (Bathurst, New South Wales)	4–7 October		(New Zealand) Jaxon Evans	(Australia) Jordan Love	Sonic Motor Racing Services	(New Zealand) Jaxon Evans
8	R1	Surfers Paradise Street Circuit (Gold Coast, Queensland)	19–21 October	(Australia) David Wall	(New Zealand) Earl Bamber	(Australia) Nick McBride	Porsche Centre Melbourne	(Australia) Nick McBride
8	R2	Surfers Paradise Street Circuit (Gold Coast, Queensland)	19–21 October		(Australia) Nick McBride	(Australia) Nick McBride	Porsche Centre Melbourne	(Australia) Nick McBride
8	R3	Surfers Paradise Street Circuit (Gold Coast, Queensland)	19–21 October		(Australia) Nick McBride	(New Zealand) Jaxon Evans	McElrea Racing	(Australia) Nick McBride

== Series standings ==
Series standings are as follows:

Pos.	Driver	ADE (South Australia)			AGP (Victoria (state))				PHI (Victoria (state))		HID (Northern Territory)			SYD (New South Wales)		BEN (South Australia)			BAT (New South Wales)			SUR (Queensland)			Pts.
Pro
1	(New Zealand) Jaxon Evans	2	1	1	2	2	2	1	4	4	2	1	15	3	7	4	2	2	2	1	3	4	4	1	1186
2	(Australia) David Wall	4	2	2	4	3	12	4	5	7	1	Ret	4	5	4	2	3	5	1	3	13	2	3	4	1004
3	(Australia) Dylan O'Keeffe	3	3	5	7	11	7	2	3	3	3	2	2	1	3	5	5	7	8	5	2	Ret	19	11	957
4	(Australia) Jordan Love	6	6	4	3	7	5	3	6	Ret	8	4	Ret	4	1	8	4	4	3	2	1	Ret	7	7	833
5	(Australia) James Moffat	5	5	7	5	4	18	6	13	5	4	3	1	2	2	9	9	6	17	9	5	9	5	DNS	815
6	(Australia) Dale Wood	1	7	6	1	1	1	10	1	1	5	Ret	6	Ret	11	3	6	1	Ret	Ret	Ret	5	6	5	802
7	(Australia) Michael Almond	7	4	3	8	6	4	21	7	6	10	5	3	8	8	1	1	3	Ret	DNS	DNS	Ret	14	9	681
8	(Australia) Nick McBride	Ret	11	8	15	9	6	5	8	10	7	Ret	DNS	7	6	Ret	DNS	DNS	6	7	7	1	1	2	592
9	(Australia) Peter Major	9	20	16	9	Ret	9	7	9	9	18	12	7	10	19	10	10	11	10	10	8	15	17	17	494
10	(Australia) Adam Garwood	11	10	10	20	14	21	14	24	11	17	15	11	13	12	11	21	15	7	8	6	8	9	Ret	483
11	(Australia) Cameron Hill	16	8	9					25	Ret	6	6	Ret	6	5	6	7	8	4	4	4	7	Ret	15	480
12	(Australia) Glen Wood										12	8	5	9	9	7	8	9	5	6	Ret	6	6	6	405
13	(Australia) Josh Hunt	17	18	15	10	8	8	9	12	8	16	Ret	18	11	10				9	11	Ret	13	11	8	402
14	(Australia) Alex Davison				6	5	3	Ret	2	2															239
15	(New Zealand) Earl Bamber																					3	2	3	150
16	(Australia) Leanne Tander	18	21	Ret																					30
Challenge
1	(Australia) Stephen Grove	10	13	14	Ret	16	10	8	14	12	11	9	8	15	13	15	16	21	9	11	11	17	17	16	1105
2	(Australia) Adrian Flack	14	14	13	21	17	Ret	12	16	13	9	7	17	12	14	Ret	12	10	20	17	10	10	10	10	1032
3	(New Zealand) Tim Miles	12	Ret	18	14	10	11	13	18	Ret	14	10	9	17	16	13	17	18	10	12	9	12	13	13	954
4	(Australia) Anthony Gilbertson	23	15	17			Ret	16	11	20	15	13	10	16	15	14	13	13	13	15	16	11	12	12	919
5	(Australia) Roger Lago	8	9	11	11	15	17	11	15	15	13	11	12	14	17	16	11	14	Ret	Ret	DNS				841
6	(Australia) Dean Cook	20	22	20	16	12	12	15	22	17	20	16	14	19	20	17	Ret	17	15	16	12	14	15	14	756
7	(Australia) Marc Cini	19	16	Ret		18	19	22	19	18	Ret	18	16	21	22	22	20	20	16	18	15	16	16	18	587
8	(Australia) Graham Williams	25	24	23	Ret	21	22	19	23	19	21	17	19	22	23	20	19	23	19	20	17	18	21	Ret	497
9	(Australia) Max Twigg	15	12	12	12	Ret	15	18	10	Ret						18	15	12							447
10	(Australia) Indiran Padayachee	24	25	22	18	20	20	20	20	16				20	21	21	18	22	18	21	18	19	22	Ret	436
11	(Australia) Sam Shahin	21	17	18	13	19	16	17	17	Ret						12	Ret	16	Ret	19	14				384
12	(Australia) Greg Taylor	22	17	21	17	13	14	Ret			Ret	14	13												232
13	(Australia) John Steffensen	15	23	24	19	Ret	DNS	DNS	21	14	19	Ret	DNS												202
14	(Australia) David Stevens																		14	14	Ret	Ret	20	19	128
15	(Australia) Shane Smollen												18	18											106
16	(Australia) Benjamin Stack															19	14	19							94
