= 2022 Supercars Championship =

Motor racing competition

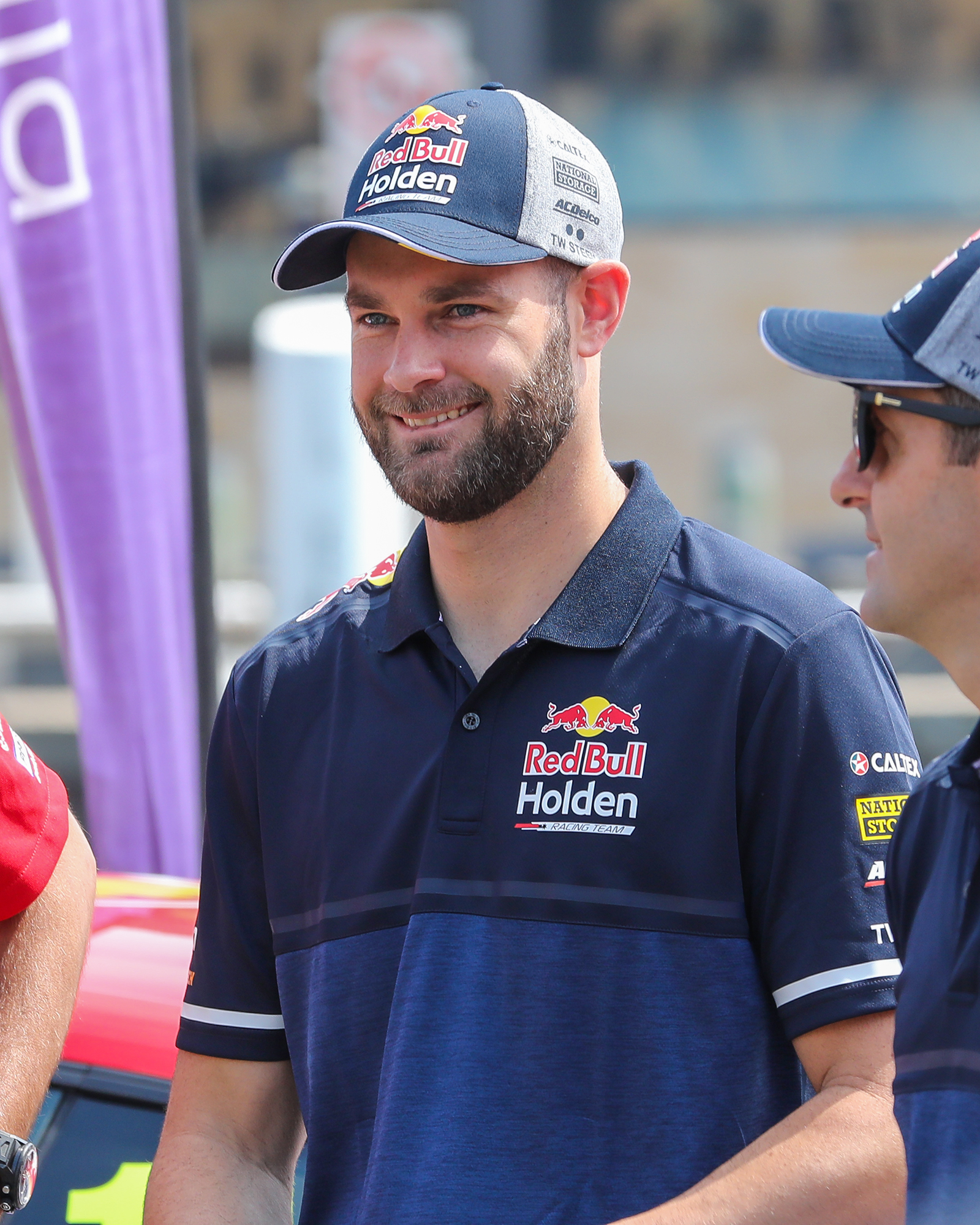
Shane van Gisbergen successfully defended the Drivers' Championship

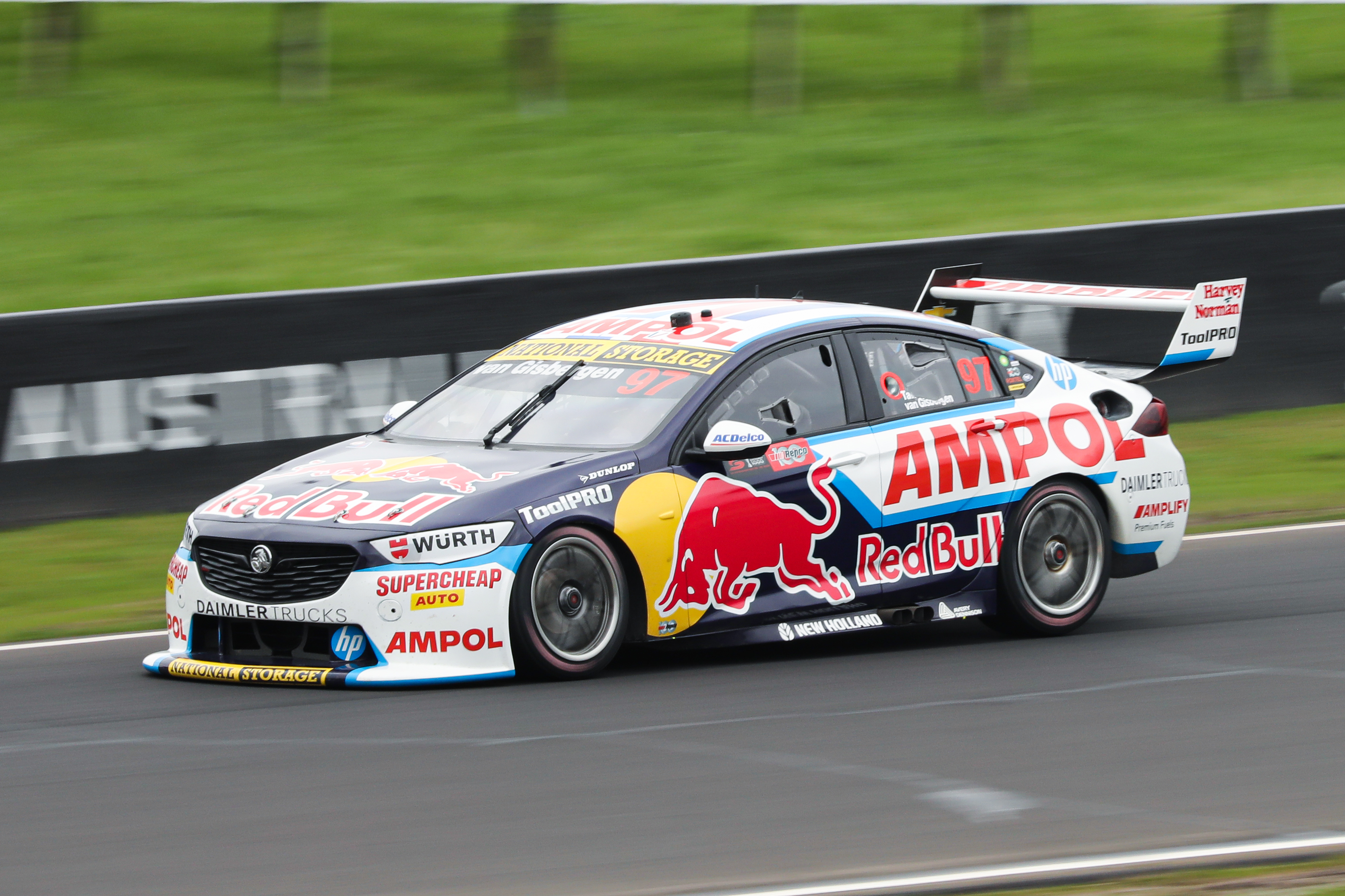
Triple Eight Race Engineering successfully defended the Teams' Championship

The 2022 Supercars Championship (known for commercial reasons as the 2022 Repco Supercars Championship) was a motor racing series for Supercars. It was the twenty-fourth running of the Supercars Championship and the twenty-sixth series in which Supercars have contested the Australian Touring Car Championship, the premier title in Australian motorsport.

Shane van Gisbergen successfully defended the Drivers' Championship, claiming his third title. In a display of dominance throughout the season, he broke the record for the most wins in a single season with 21 wins, eclipsing Scott McLaughlin's record of 18 wins in 2019. Triple Eight Race Engineering (racing as Red Bull Ampol Racing) successfully defended the Teams' Championship. Holden won its final Manufacturers' Championship at The Bend SuperSprint.

== Teams and drivers ==
The following teams and drivers competed in the 2022 championship.

| Championship entries | | | | | | Bathurst 1000 entries |
| Manufacturer | Model | Team | No. | Driver name | Rounds | Co-driver name |
|---|---|---|---|---|---|---|
| Ford | Mustang GT | Blanchard Racing Team | 3 | (Australia) Tim Slade | All | (Australia) Tim Blanchard |
| Ford | Mustang GT | Tickford Racing | 5 | (Australia) James Courtney | All | (Australia) Zane Goddard |
| Ford | Mustang GT | Tickford Racing | 6 | (Australia) Cam Waters | All | (Australia) James Moffat |
| Ford | Mustang GT | Tickford Racing | 55 | (Australia) Thomas Randle | All | (Australia) Zak Best |
| Ford | Mustang GT | Tickford Racing | 56 | (Australia) Jake Kostecki | All | (Australia) Kurt Kostecki |
| Ford | Mustang GT | Grove Racing | 10 | (Australia) Lee Holdsworth | All | (New Zealand) Matt Payne |
| Ford | Mustang GT | Grove Racing | 26 | (Australia) David Reynolds | All | (Australia) Matt Campbell |
| Ford | Mustang GT | Dick Johnson Racing | 11 | (Australia) Anton de Pasquale | All | (Australia) Tony D'Alberto |
| Ford | Mustang GT | Dick Johnson Racing | 17 | (Australia) Will Davison | All | (Australia) Alex Davison |
| Holden | Commodore ZB | Walkinshaw Andretti United | 2 | (Australia) Nick Percat | All | (Australia) Warren Luff |
| Holden | Commodore ZB | Walkinshaw Andretti United | 25 | (Australia) Chaz Mostert | All | (New Zealand) Fabian Coulthard |
| Holden | Commodore ZB | Brad Jones Racing | 4 | (Australia) Jack Smith | All | (New Zealand) Jaxon Evans |
| Holden | Commodore ZB | Brad Jones Racing | 8 | (New Zealand) Andre Heimgartner | All | (Australia) Dale Wood |
| Holden | Commodore ZB | Brad Jones Racing | 14 | (Australia) Bryce Fullwood | All | (Australia) Dean Fiore |
| Holden | Commodore ZB | Brad Jones Racing | 96 | (Australia) Macauley Jones | All | (Australia) Jordan Boys |
| Holden | Commodore ZB | Erebus Motorsport | 9 | (Australia) Will Brown | All | (Australia) Jack Perkins |
| Holden | Commodore ZB | Erebus Motorsport | 99 | (Australia) Brodie Kostecki | All | (Australia) David Russell |
| Holden | Commodore ZB | Team 18 | 18 | (Australia) Mark Winterbottom | All | (Australia) Michael Caruso |
| Holden | Commodore ZB | Team 18 | 20 | (Australia) Scott Pye | All | (Australia) Tyler Everingham |
| Holden | Commodore ZB | PremiAir Racing | 22 | (New Zealand) Chris Pither | All | (Australia) Cameron Hill |
| Holden | Commodore ZB | PremiAir Racing | 31 | (Australia) James Golding | 7–13 | (Australia) Dylan O'Keeffe |
| Holden | Commodore ZB | PremiAir Racing | 76 | (Australia) Garry Jacobson | 1–6 | —N/a |
| Holden | Commodore ZB | Matt Stone Racing | 34 | (Australia) Jack Le Brocq | All | (Australia) Aaron Seton |
| Holden | Commodore ZB | Matt Stone Racing | 35 | (Australia) Todd Hazelwood | All | (Australia) Jayden Ojeda |
| Holden | Commodore ZB | Triple Eight Race Engineering | 88 | (Australia) Broc Feeney | All | (Australia) Jamie Whincup |
| Holden | Commodore ZB | Triple Eight Race Engineering | 97 | (New Zealand) Shane van Gisbergen | All | (Australia) Garth Tander |
Wildcard entries
| Ford | Mustang GT | Tickford Racing | 78 | (Australia) Zak Best | 6, 8 | —N/a |
| Holden | Commodore ZB | Walkinshaw Andretti United | 27 | (Australia) Jayden Ojeda | 5–6 | —N/a |
| Holden | Commodore ZB | Image Racing | 49 | (Australia) Jordan Boys | 5, 8 | —N/a |
| Holden | Commodore ZB | Erebus Motorsport | 51 | —N/a | 11 | (New Zealand) Greg Murphy (New Zealand) Richie Stanaway |
| Holden | Commodore ZB | Matt Chahda Motorsport | 118 | —N/a | 11 | (Australia) Matt Chahda (Australia) Jaylyn Robotham |
| Holden | Commodore ZB | Triple Eight Race Engineering | 888 | —N/a | 11 | (Australia) Craig Lowndes (Australia) Declan Fraser |

=== Team changes ===
The field expanded from 24 to 25 cars after Supercars management sold a dormant Teams Racing Charter (TRC) to Tickford Racing. Tickford thus expanded to four cars, running the #56 entry for Jake Kostecki.

The Grove Group took full ownership of Kelly Grove Racing, renaming the team to Grove Racing.

Peter Xiberras, managing director of PremiAir Hire, purchased Team Sydney and renamed it PremiAir Racing.

=== Driver changes ===
Jamie Whincup retired from full-time competition at the end of the 2021 season and replaced Roland Dane as team principal and managing director of Triple Eight Race Engineering. 2021 Super2 Series champion Broc Feeney graduated to replace Whincup. Whincup returned as an endurance co-driver alongside Feeney.

Thomas Randle moved up to the series full time with Tickford Racing, having raced as a wildcard in several events for the team in both 2019 and 2021.

Jake Kostecki and Zane Goddard left Matt Stone Racing, with Kostecki replacing Jack Le Brocq at Tickford Racing. Le Brocq joined Matt Stone Racing in a straight driver swap. Todd Hazelwood also returned to the team, having last raced for them in 2019. Zane Goddard was unable to raise sufficient sponsorship to compete full-time in 2022. He returned as an endurance co-driver for Tickford Racing.

Bryce Fullwood left Walkinshaw Andretti United to replace Hazelwood at Brad Jones Racing, with Fullwood's seat filled by Nick Percat, who returned to Walkinshaw, a team he last raced for in 2014 under James Rosenberg Racing.

Andre Heimgartner left Grove Racing to replace Nick Percat at Brad Jones Racing. He was replaced by Lee Holdsworth.

Chris Pither returned to the championship, replacing Fabian Coulthard who was dropped from the PremiAir Racing driver line-up. Coulthard joined Walkinshaw Andretti United as an endurance co-driver.

=== Mid-season changes ===
Garry Jacobson left PremiAir Racing after the Darwin Triple Crown round and was replaced by James Golding, who last raced full time in 2019.

=== Wildcard entries ===
Several wildcards would be entered in 2022, with Tickford Racing again running another entry, this time for Zak Best at Darwin and The Bend. Walkinshaw Andretti United also continued their wildcard, this time for Jayden Ojeda at Winton and Darwin. Super2 Series team Image Racing also entered Jordan Boys at Winton and The Bend ahead of his endurance co-drive with Macauley Jones.

Three wildcards would be entered at the Bathurst 1000. Greg Murphy and Richie Stanaway drove a third Erebus Motorsport entry. Matt Chahda Motorsport was granted an entry and competed with Chahda himself and Jaylyn Robotham. Finally, Triple Eight Race Engineering again entered a third car for Craig Lowndes and Declan Fraser.

== Calendar ==
Australian rounds

Thirteen circuits hosted a round of the 2022 championship.

New Zealand rounds

| Round | Event | Circuit | Location | Dates |
|---|---|---|---|---|
| 1 | Sydney SuperNight | (New South Wales) Sydney Motorsport Park | Eastern Creek, New South Wales | 5–6 March |
| 2 | Tasmania SuperSprint | (Tasmania) Symmons Plains Raceway | Launceston, Tasmania | 26–27 March |
| 3 | Melbourne 400 | (Victoria (state)) Albert Park Circuit | Albert Park, Victoria | 8–10 April |
| 4 | Perth SuperNight | (Western Australia) Wanneroo Raceway | Neerabup, Western Australia | 30 April – 1 May |
| 5 | Winton SuperSprint | (Victoria (state)) Winton Motor Raceway | Benalla, Victoria | 21–22 May |
| 6 | Darwin Triple Crown | (Northern Territory) Hidden Valley Raceway | Darwin, Northern Territory | 18–19 June |
| 7 | Townsville 500 | (Queensland) Reid Park Street Circuit | Townsville, Queensland | 9–10 July |
| 8 | The Bend SuperSprint | (South Australia) The Bend Motorsport Park | Tailem Bend, South Australia | 30–31 July |
| 9 | Sandown SuperSprint | (Victoria (state)) Sandown Raceway | Springvale, Victoria | 20–21 August |
| 10 | Auckland SuperSprint | (New Zealand) Pukekohe Park Raceway | Pukekohe, Auckland Region | 10–11 September |
| 11 | Bathurst 1000 | (New South Wales) Mount Panorama Circuit | Bathurst, New South Wales | 9 October |
| 12 | Gold Coast 500 | (Queensland) Surfers Paradise Street Circuit | Surfers Paradise, Queensland | 29–30 October |
| 13 | Adelaide 500 | (South Australia) Adelaide Street Circuit | Adelaide, South Australia | 3–4 December |

=== Calendar changes ===
Albert Park, Auckland, Gold Coast, Newcastle, Perth and Winton returned after absence due to the COVID-19 pandemic.

The Adelaide 500 returned to the calendar after being cancelled in 2021 following the result of the 2022 South Australian state election.

=== Impact of COVID-19 pandemic ===
The Newcastle 500 was cancelled due to the COVID-19 Omicron outbreak in New South Wales. Sydney Motorsport Park hosted the opening round of the championship, as Sydney SuperNight.

== Rule changes ==
The red flag rule during qualifying was amended. Previously if a driver caused a red flag in the session, their fastest time was deleted and they were ruled out for the remainder of the session. Now if a driver causes a red flag and is able to bring the car back to the pits, their fastest lap gets deleted, but they are now able to resume being a part of the session. This comes after Cameron Waters brought out the red flag at the second Sydney Motorsport Park round in 2021 and was able to return to the pits under his own power.

== Results and standings ==
=== Season summary ===
| Round | Race | Event | Pole position | Fastest lap | Winning driver | Winning team | Report |
|---|---|---|---|---|---|---|---|
| 1 | 1 | Sydney SuperNight | (Australia) Anton de Pasquale | (New Zealand) Andre Heimgartner | (New Zealand) Shane van Gisbergen | Triple Eight Race Engineering | Report |
| 1 | 2 | Sydney SuperNight | (Australia) Brodie Kostecki | (Australia) Broc Feeney | (Australia) Chaz Mostert | Walkinshaw Andretti United | Report |
| 2 | 3 | Tasmania SuperSprint | (Australia) Cam Waters | (Australia) David Reynolds | (New Zealand) Shane van Gisbergen | Triple Eight Race Engineering | Report |
| 2 | 4 | Tasmania SuperSprint | (New Zealand) Shane van Gisbergen | (New Zealand) Shane van Gisbergen | (New Zealand) Shane van Gisbergen | Triple Eight Race Engineering | Report |
| 2 | 5 | Tasmania SuperSprint | (Australia) Will Davison | (New Zealand) Shane van Gisbergen | (New Zealand) Shane van Gisbergen | Triple Eight Race Engineering | Report |
| 3 | 6 | Melbourne 400 | (Australia) David Reynolds | (Australia) Will Brown | (Australia) Chaz Mostert | Walkinshaw Andretti United | Report |
| 3 | 7 | Melbourne 400 | (Australia) Will Davison | (New Zealand) Shane van Gisbergen | (New Zealand) Shane van Gisbergen | Triple Eight Race Engineering | Report |
| 3 | 8 | Melbourne 400 | (Australia) Anton de Pasquale | (Australia) Scott Pye | (New Zealand) Shane van Gisbergen | Triple Eight Race Engineering | Report |
| 3 | 9 | Melbourne 400 | (Australia) Will Davison | (Australia) Todd Hazelwood | (Australia) Chaz Mostert | Walkinshaw Andretti United | Report |
| 4 | 10 | Perth SuperNight | (Australia) Anton de Pasquale | (New Zealand) Shane van Gisbergen | (New Zealand) Shane van Gisbergen | Triple Eight Race Engineering | Report |
| 4 | 11 | Perth SuperNight | (Australia) Will Davison | (New Zealand) Andre Heimgartner | (Australia) Will Davison | Dick Johnson Racing | Report |
| 4 | 12 | Perth SuperNight | (New Zealand) Shane van Gisbergen | (New Zealand) Shane van Gisbergen | (New Zealand) Shane van Gisbergen | Triple Eight Race Engineering | Report |
| 5 | 13 | Winton SuperSprint | (New Zealand) Shane van Gisbergen | (Australia) David Reynolds | (Australia) Cam Waters | Tickford Racing | Report |
| 5 | 14 | Winton SuperSprint | (Australia) Cam Waters | (Australia) James Courtney | (New Zealand) Shane van Gisbergen | Triple Eight Race Engineering | Report |
| 5 | 15 | Winton SuperSprint | (Australia) Cam Waters | (New Zealand) Shane van Gisbergen | (Australia) Cam Waters | Tickford Racing | Report |
| 6 | 16 | Darwin Triple Crown | (Australia) Will Davison | (New Zealand) Shane van Gisbergen | (Australia) Anton de Pasquale | Dick Johnson Racing | Report |
| 6 | 17 | Darwin Triple Crown | (Australia) Cam Waters | (Australia) David Reynolds | (Australia) Cam Waters | Tickford Racing | Report |
| 6 | 18 | Darwin Triple Crown | (Australia) Will Davison | (Australia) Will Davison | (Australia) Chaz Mostert | Walkinshaw Andretti United | Report |
| 7 | 19 | Townsville 500 | (New Zealand) Shane van Gisbergen | (Australia) Lee Holdsworth | (New Zealand) Shane van Gisbergen | Triple Eight Race Engineering | Report |
| 7 | 20 | Townsville 500 | (Australia) Cam Waters | (Australia) Will Davison | (New Zealand) Shane van Gisbergen | Triple Eight Race Engineering | Report |
| 8 | 21 | The Bend SuperSprint | (Australia) Zak Best | (New Zealand) Shane van Gisbergen | (New Zealand) Shane van Gisbergen | Triple Eight Race Engineering | Report |
| 8 | 22 | The Bend SuperSprint | (Australia) Cam Waters | (New Zealand) Shane van Gisbergen | (New Zealand) Shane van Gisbergen | Triple Eight Race Engineering | Report |
| 8 | 23 | The Bend SuperSprint | (Australia) Cam Waters | (New Zealand) Shane van Gisbergen | (New Zealand) Shane van Gisbergen | Triple Eight Race Engineering | Report |
| 9 | 24 | Sandown SuperSprint | (Australia) Will Davison | (Australia) Broc Feeney | (Australia) Will Davison | Dick Johnson Racing | Report |
| 9 | 25 | Sandown SuperSprint | (New Zealand) Shane van Gisbergen | (New Zealand) Shane van Gisbergen | (New Zealand) Shane van Gisbergen | Triple Eight Race Engineering | Report |
| 9 | 26 | Sandown SuperSprint | (Australia) Will Davison | (Australia) Will Davison | (New Zealand) Shane van Gisbergen | Triple Eight Race Engineering | Report |
| 10 | 27 | Auckland SuperSprint | (Australia) Cam Waters | (New Zealand) Shane van Gisbergen | (Australia) Will Davison | Dick Johnson Racing | Report |
| 10 | 28 | Auckland SuperSprint | (New Zealand) Shane van Gisbergen | (New Zealand) Shane van Gisbergen | (New Zealand) Shane van Gisbergen | Triple Eight Race Engineering | Report |
| 10 | 29 | Auckland SuperSprint | (Australia) Will Davison | (New Zealand) Shane van Gisbergen | (New Zealand) Shane van Gisbergen | Triple Eight Race Engineering | Report |
| 11 | 30 | Bathurst 1000 | (Australia) Cam Waters | (New Zealand) Shane van Gisbergen | (New Zealand) Shane van Gisbergen (Australia) Garth Tander | Triple Eight Race Engineering | Report |
| 12 | 31 | Gold Coast 500 | (Australia) David Reynolds | (Australia) David Reynolds | (New Zealand) Shane van Gisbergen | Triple Eight Race Engineering | Report |
| 12 | 32 | Gold Coast 500 | (New Zealand) Shane van Gisbergen | (New Zealand) Shane van Gisbergen | (New Zealand) Shane van Gisbergen | Triple Eight Race Engineering | Report |
| 13 | 33 | Adelaide 500 | (Australia) Cam Waters | (Australia) Chaz Mostert | (Australia) Chaz Mostert | Walkinshaw Andretti United | Report |
| 13 | 34 | Adelaide 500 | (Australia) Anton De Pasquale | (New Zealand) Shane van Gisbergen | (Australia) Broc Feeney | Triple Eight Race Engineering | Report |

=== Points system ===
Points were awarded for each race at an event, to the driver or drivers of a car that completed at least 75% of the race distance and was running at the completion of the race. At least 50% of the planned race distance must be completed for the result to be valid and championship points awarded. No extra points were awarded if the fastest lap time is achieved by a driver who was classified outside the top fifteen.

| Points format | Position | | | | | | | | | | | | | | | | | | | | | | | | | | | | |
| Points format | 1st | 2nd | 3rd | 4th | 5th | 6th | 7th | 8th | 9th | 10th | 11th | 12th | 13th | 14th | 15th | 16th | 17th | 18th | 19th | 20th | 21st | 22nd | 23rd | 24th | 25th | 26th | 27th | 28th | FL |
|---|---|---|---|---|---|---|---|---|---|---|---|---|---|---|---|---|---|---|---|---|---|---|---|---|---|---|---|---|---|
| Bathurst | 300 | 276 | 258 | 240 | 222 | 204 | 192 | 180 | 168 | 156 | 144 | 138 | 132 | 126 | 120 | 114 | 108 | 102 | 96 | 90 | 84 | 78 | 72 | 66 | 60 | 54 | 48 | 42 | |
| Two-race | 150 | 138 | 129 | 120 | 111 | 102 | 96 | 90 | 84 | 78 | 72 | 69 | 66 | 63 | 60 | 57 | 54 | 51 | 48 | 45 | 42 | 39 | 36 | 33 | 30 | | | | |
| SuperSprint | 100 | 92 | 86 | 80 | 74 | 68 | 64 | 60 | 56 | 52 | 48 | 46 | 44 | 42 | 40 | 38 | 36 | 34 | 32 | 30 | 28 | 26 | 24 | 22 | 20 | 18 | 16 | | 5 |
| Melbourne | 75 | 69 | 64 | 60 | 55 | 51 | 48 | 45 | 42 | 39 | 36 | 34 | 33 | 31 | 30 | 28 | 27 | 25 | 24 | 22 | 21 | 19 | 18 | 16 | 15 | | | | 5 |

- Bathurst: Used for the Bathurst 1000.
- Two-race: Used for the Sydney SuperNight, Townsville 500, Gold Coast 500 and Adelaide 500.
- SuperSprint: Used for all SuperSprint races, the Perth SuperNight and Darwin Triple Crown.
- Melbourne: Used for the Melbourne 400.

=== Drivers' championship ===
| Pos. | Driver | No. | SMP (New South Wales) | | SYM (Tasmania) | | | MEL (Victoria (state)) | | | | WAN (Western Australia) | | | WIN (Victoria (state)) | | | HID (Northern Territory) | | | TOW (Queensland) | | BEN (South Australia) | | | SAN (Victoria (state)) | | | PUK (New Zealand) | | | BAT (New South Wales) | SUR (Queensland) | | ADE (South Australia) | | Pen. | Pts. |
|---|---|---|---|---|---|---|---|---|---|---|---|---|---|---|---|---|---|---|---|---|---|---|---|---|---|---|---|---|---|---|---|---|---|---|---|---|---|---|
| 1 | (New Zealand) Shane van Gisbergen | 97 | 1 | 6 | 1 | **1** | 1 | 3 | 1 | 1 | 20 | 1 | 5 | **1** | **2** | 1 | 2 | 3 | 3 | 21 | **1** | 1 | 1 | 1 | 1 | 2 | **1** | 1 | 5 | **1** | 1 | 1 | 1 | **1** | 20 | 7 | 0 | 3523 |
| 2 | (Australia) Cam Waters | 6 | 11 | 4 | **3** | 17 | 6 | 18 | 21 | 8 | 7 | 3 | 4 | 7 | 1 | **2** | **1** | 7 | **1** | 3 | 3 | **3** | 4 | **4** | **2** | 5 | 7 | 10 | **3** | 3 | 2 | **3** | 5 | 7 | **13** | 4 | 0 | 2908 |
| 3 | (Australia) Chaz Mostert | 25 | 3 | 1 | 23 | 4 | 18 | 1 | 22 | 5 | 1 | 22 | 12 | 19 | 4 | 5 | 11 | DSQ | 8 | 1 | 9 | 5 | 3 | 2 | 8 | 10 | 2 | 4 | 4 | 2 | 6 | 2 | 3 | 2 | 1 | 2 | 0 | 2835 |
| 4 | (Australia) Anton de Pasquale | 11 | **2** | 3 | 6 | 5 | 3 | 23 | 20 | **4** | 3 | **2** | 2 | 4 | 8 | 10 | 8 | 1 | 4 | 2 | 6 | 2 | 9 | 5 | 7 | 3 | 8 | 24 | 6 | Ret | 5 | 7 | 6 | DSQ | 14 | **3** | 0 | 2599 |
| 5 | (Australia) Will Davison | 17 | 4 | 7 | 2 | 16 | **2** | 16 | **24** | 2 | **2** | 6 | **1** | 3 | 11 | 14 | 10 | **2** | 2 | **4** | 2 | 7 | 2 | 13 | 4 | **1** | 15 | **2** | 1 | 4 | **22** | Ret | 4 | 3 | 7 | 19 | 0 | 2573 |
| 6 | (Australia) Broc Feeney | 88 | 9 | 11 | 5 | 2 | 8 | 8 | 14 | 6 | 12 | 5 | 8 | 11 | 10 | 12 | 7 | 8 | 13 | 6 | 7 | 6 | 7 | 6 | 5 | 14 | 10 | 3 | 7 | 8 | 4 | 5 | 14 | Ret | 8 | 1 | 0 | 2377 |
| 7 | (Australia) Brodie Kostecki | 99 | 5 | **2** | 4 | 19 | 22 | 14 | 7 | 15 | 5 | 8 | 6 | 21 | 7 | 11 | 13 | 10 | 16 | 24 | 12 | 16 | 6 | 24 | 3 | 11 | 23 | 16 | 20 | 18 | 19 | 4 | 7 | 5 | 4 | 8 | 0 | 2142 |
| 8 | (Australia) David Reynolds | 26 | 24 | 9 | 21 | 3 | 4 | **2** | 2 | 3 | Ret | 4 | 11 | 6 | 3 | 3 | 4 | 25 | 5 | 12 | 18 | 11 | 8 | 8 | 22 | 12 | 4 | 9 | 9 | 7 | 8 | Ret | **2** | 4 | 11 | 15 | 0 | 2132 |
| 9 | (Australia) Mark Winterbottom | 18 | 16 | 12 | 18 | 6 | 7 | 7 | 12 | 17 | 9 | 14 | 16 | 20 | 21 | 9 | 9 | 5 | 7 | 9 | 25 | 10 | 16 | 9 | 15 | 8 | 12 | 5 | 11 | 22 | 12 | 15 | 9 | 6 | 6 | 11 | 0 | 1909 |
| 10 | (New Zealand) Andre Heimgartner | 8 | 14 | 5 | 8 | Ret | 24 | 15 | Ret | 18 | 17 | 10 | 3 | 9 | 9 | 7 | 3 | 4 | 9 | 5 | 4 | 9 | 10 | Ret | DNS | 23 | 6 | 13 | 2 | 6 | 3 | Ret | Ret | 8 | 9 | 5 | 0 | 1877 |
| 11 | (Australia) Tim Slade | 3 | 8 | 10 | 11 | 15 | 11 | 4 | 8 | 7 | 4 | 13 | 13 | 10 | 16 | 15 | 20 | 12 | 14 | 11 | 8 | 8 | 23 | 16 | 11 | 18 | 11 | 6 | Ret | 15 | 10 | 19 | 12 | 10 | 5 | 13 | 0 | 1855 |
| 12 | (Australia) James Courtney | 5 | 10 | 17 | 12 | 8 | 9 | 20 | 9 | 9 | 22 | 7 | 7 | 2 | 13 | 8 | 27 | 9 | Ret | 19 | 20 | 4 | 14 | 3 | 12 | 6 | 13 | 12 | 18 | 16 | Ret | Ret | 8 | 17 | 3 | 17 | 0 | 1748 |
| 13 | (Australia) Lee Holdsworth | 10 | 21 | 16 | 9 | 9 | 14 | 22 | 3 | 13 | 10 | 11 | 21 | 12 | 5 | 4 | 6 | 15 | 12 | 16 | 17 | 23 | 15 | 22 | 10 | 24 | 18 | 18 | 12 | 12 | 14 | 6 | 15 | Ret | 10 | 9 | 0 | 1734 |
| 14 | (Australia) Will Brown | 9 | 7 | 8 | 13 | 12 | 15 | 17 | 23 | 24 | 8 | 17 | Ret | 5 | 27 | 6 | 5 | Ret | 20 | 7 | 11 | 19 | 20 | 7 | 6 | 4 | 3 | 11 | 19 | Ret | DNS | 10 | 24 | 11 | 22 | 6 | 0 | 1714 |
| 15 | (Australia) Nick Percat | 2 | 6 | 23 | 24 | 11 | 10 | 5 | 17 | 16 | 6 | 21 | 18 | 15 | 14 | 16 | 15 | 14 | 10 | 10 | 13 | 12 | 13 | Ret | 9 | 15 | 19 | 22 | 8 | 14 | 9 | 22 | 10 | Ret | 2 | 12 | 0 | 1643 |
| 16 | (Australia) Scott Pye | 20 | Ret | 15 | 7 | 7 | 13 | 11 | 4 | 25 | 11 | 19 | Ret | DNS | 6 | Ret | 14 | 6 | Ret | DNS | 5 | Ret | 12 | 20 | 13 | 7 | 5 | 7 | 10 | 5 | 7 | 16 | 17 | 12 | Ret | 14 | 0 | 1512 |
| 17 | (Australia) Bryce Fullwood | 14 | 12 | 19 | 15 | 18 | 21 | 10 | 10 | 22 | 19 | Ret | NC | 14 | 20 | 21 | 23 | 18 | 15 | 14 | 15 | 13 | 17 | 10 | 17 | 16 | 21 | 14 | 22 | 11 | 13 | 9 | 22 | 13 | 17 | Ret | 0 | 1383 |
| 18 | (Australia) Todd Hazelwood | 35 | 15 | 13 | 10 | 10 | 5 | 19 | 5 | 14 | 14 | 9 | 10 | 8 | 23 | 17 | 18 | 16 | 24 | 23 | 21 | 15 | 18 | 17 | 21 | 21 | 24 | 24 | 15 | 20 | 23 | 20 | 18 | Ret | Ret | 21 | 0 | 1345 |
| 19 | (Australia) Macauley Jones | 96 | 22 | 21 | 19 | 13 | 19 | 6 | 11 | 23 | 18 | 15 | 19 | 16 | 15 | 19 | 19 | 20 | 17 | 18 | 22 | 22 | 22 | 14 | 20 | 17 | 14 | 17 | Ret | 13 | 17 | 13 | 20 | Ret | 12 | 22 | 0 | 1282 |
| 20 | (New Zealand) Chris Pither | 22 | 23 | 20 | 20 | 14 | 16 | 24 | 16 | 19 | 21 | 24 | 15 | 17 | 26 | 24 | 22 | 23 | 22 | 20 | 19 | 18 | 24 | 12 | 18 | 25 | 16 | 21 | 13 | 19 | 16 | 21 | 16 | 9 | 19 | 16 | 0 | 1257 |
| 21 | (Australia) Jack Le Brocq | 34 | 13 | 22 | Ret | Ret | 23 | 25 | 15 | 12 | 16 | 16 | 17 | 13 | 18 | 13 | 17 | 13 | 6 | 13 | 10 | 14 | 21 | 15 | Ret | 19 | 25 | Ret | 23 | Ret | 21 | 14 | 13 | 16 | 18 | Ret | 0 | 1237 |
| 22 | (Australia) Jake Kostecki | 56 | 19 | 24 | 14 | Ret | 25 | 12 | 13 | 20 | 13 | 20 | 9 | Ret | 24 | 20 | 25 | 11 | 11 | 8 | 14 | 24 | 27 | 18 | Ret | 22 | 20 | 20 | 21 | 9 | 15 | 17 | 23 | 15 | 16 | Ret | 0 | 1192 |
| 23 | (Australia) Thomas Randle | 55 | 20 | 14 | 22 | Ret | 12 | 21 | 18 | 11 | Ret | 12 | 20 | 22 | 12 | 18 | 12 | 19 | Ret | 15 | 16 | 17 | 11 | Ret | DNS | 9 | 17 | 8 | 16 | 21 | 18 | Ret | 11 | Ret | 15 | 18 | 0 | 1156 |
| 24 | (Australia) Jack Smith | 4 | 17 | 18 | 17 | 20 | 17 | 13 | 19 | 21 | Ret | 23 | Ret | 18 | 22 | 23 | 26 | 24 | 19 | 17 | 24 | 20 | 26 | 21 | 19 | 20 | 22 | 15 | 14 | 17 | 20 | Ret | 21 | 14 | 21 | 20 | 0 | 1054 |
| 25 | (Australia) James Golding | 31 | | | | | | | | | | | | | | | | | | | 23 | 21 | 19 | 23 | 14 | 13 | 9 | 19 | 17 | 10 | 11 | 12 | 19 | Ret | Ret | 10 | 0 | 708 |
| 26 | (Australia) Garry Jacobson | 76 | 18 | Ret | 16 | DNS | 20 | 9 | 6 | 10 | 15 | 18 | 14 | Ret | 19 | Ret | 16 | 22 | 18 | 22 | | | | | | | | | | | | | | | | | 0 | 513 |
| 27 | (Australia) Garth Tander | 97 | | | | | | | | | | | | | | | | | | | | | | | | | | | | | | 1 | | | | | 0 | 300 |
| 28 | (Australia) Jordan Boys | 49/96 | | | | | | | | | | | | | 25 | 25 | 24 | | | | | | 25 | 11 | 16 | | | | | | | 13 | | | | | 0 | 300 |
| 29 | (New Zealand) Fabian Coulthard | 25 | | | | | | | | | | | | | | | | | | | | | | | | | | | | | | 2 | | | | | 0 | 276 |
| 30 | (Australia) James Moffat | 6 | | | | | | | | | | | | | | | | | | | | | | | | | | | | | | 3 | | | | | 0 | 258 |
| 31 | (Australia) David Russell | 99 | | | | | | | | | | | | | | | | | | | | | | | | | | | | | | 4 | | | | | 0 | 240 |
| 32 | (Australia) Jayden Ojeda | 27/35 | | | | | | | | | | | | | 17 | 22 | 21 | 17 | 23 | Ret | | | | | | | | | | | | 20 | | | | | 0 | 240 |
| 33 | (Australia) Jamie Whincup | 88 | | | | | | | | | | | | | | | | | | | | | | | | | | | | | | 5 | | | | | 0 | 222 |
| 34 | (New Zealand) Matt Payne | 10 | | | | | | | | | | | | | | | | | | | | | | | | | | | | | | 6 | | | | | 0 | 204 |
| 35 | (Australia) Tony D'Alberto | 100 | | | | | | | | | | | | | | | | | | | | | | | | | | | | | | 7 | | | | | 0 | 192 |
| 36 | (Australia) Declan Fraser | 888 | | | | | | | | | | | | | | | | | | | | | | | | | | | | | | 8 | | | | | 0 | 180 |
| 37 | (Australia) Craig Lowndes | 888 | | | | | | | | | | | | | | | | | | | | | | | | | | | | | | 8 | | | | | 0 | 180 |
| 38 | (Australia) Dean Fiore | 14 | | | | | | | | | | | | | | | | | | | | | | | | | | | | | | 9 | | | | | 0 | 168 |
| 39 | (Australia) Zak Best | 78/55 | | | | | | | | | | | | | | | | 21 | 21 | Ret | | | **5** | 19 | Ret | | | | | | | Ret | | | | | 0 | 162 |
| 40 | (Australia) Jack Perkins | 9 | | | | | | | | | | | | | | | | | | | | | | | | | | | | | | 10 | | | | | 0 | 156 |
| 41 | (New Zealand) Greg Murphy | 51 | | | | | | | | | | | | | | | | | | | | | | | | | | | | | | 11 | | | | | 0 | 144 |
| 42 | (New Zealand) Richie Stanaway | 51 | | | | | | | | | | | | | | | | | | | | | | | | | | | | | | 11 | | | | | 0 | 144 |
| 43 | (Australia) Dylan O'Keeffe | 31 | | | | | | | | | | | | | | | | | | | | | | | | | | | | | | 12 | | | | | 0 | 138 |
| 44 | (Australia) Aaron Seton | 34 | | | | | | | | | | | | | | | | | | | | | | | | | | | | | | 14 | | | | | 0 | 126 |
| 45 | (Australia) Michael Caruso | 18 | | | | | | | | | | | | | | | | | | | | | | | | | | | | | | 15 | | | | | 0 | 120 |
| 46 | (Australia) Tyler Everingham | 20 | | | | | | | | | | | | | | | | | | | | | | | | | | | | | | 16 | | | | | 0 | 114 |
| 47 | (Australia) Kurt Kostecki | 56 | | | | | | | | | | | | | | | | | | | | | | | | | | | | | | 17 | | | | | 0 | 108 |
| 48 | (Australia) Matt Chahda | 118 | | | | | | | | | | | | | | | | | | | | | | | | | | | | | | 18 | | | | | 0 | 102 |
| 49 | (Australia) Jaylyn Robotham | 118 | | | | | | | | | | | | | | | | | | | | | | | | | | | | | | 18 | | | | | 0 | 102 |
| 50 | (Australia) Tim Blanchard | 3 | | | | | | | | | | | | | | | | | | | | | | | | | | | | | | 19 | | | | | 0 | 96 |
| 51 | (Australia) Cameron Hill | 22 | | | | | | | | | | | | | | | | | | | | | | | | | | | | | | 21 | | | | | 0 | 84 |
| 52 | (Australia) Warren Luff | 2 | | | | | | | | | | | | | | | | | | | | | | | | | | | | | | 22 | | | | | 0 | 78 |
| – | (New Zealand) Jaxon Evans | 4 | | | | | | | | | | | | | | | | | | | | | | | | | | | | | | Ret | | | | | 0 | 0 |
| – | (Australia) Zane Goddard | 5 | | | | | | | | | | | | | | | | | | | | | | | | | | | | | | Ret | | | | | 0 | 0 |
| – | (Australia) Dale Wood | 8 | | | | | | | | | | | | | | | | | | | | | | | | | | | | | | Ret | | | | | 0 | 0 |
| – | (Australia) Alex Davison | 17 | | | | | | | | | | | | | | | | | | | | | | | | | | | | | | Ret | | | | | 0 | 0 |
| – | (Australia) Matt Campbell | 26 | | | | | | | | | | | | | | | | | | | | | | | | | | | | | | Ret | | | | | 0 | 0 |
| Pos. | Driver | No. | SMP (New South Wales) | | SYM (Tasmania) | | | MEL (Victoria (state)) | | | | WAN (Western Australia) | | | WIN (Victoria (state)) | | | HID (Northern Territory) | | | TOW (Queensland) | | BEN (South Australia) | | | SAN (Victoria (state)) | | | PUK (New Zealand) | | | BAT (New South Wales) | SUR (Queensland) | | ADE (South Australia) | | Pen. | Pts. |

Key
| Colour | Result |
|---|---|
| Gold | Winner |
| Silver | Second place |
| Bronze | Third place |
| Green | Other points position |
| Blue | Other classified position |
| Blue | Not classified, finished (NC) |
| Purple | Not classified, retired (Ret) |
| Red | Did not qualify (DNQ) |
| Red | Did not pre-qualify (DNPQ) |
| Black | Disqualified (DSQ) |
| White | Did not start (DNS) |
| White | Race cancelled (C) |
| Blank | Did not practice (DNP) |
| Blank | Excluded (EX) |
| Blank | Did not arrive (DNA) |
| Blank | Withdrawn (WD) |
| Blank | Did not enter (cell empty) |
| Text formatting | Meaning |
| **Bold** | Pole position |
| Italics | Fastest lap |

=== Teams' championship ===
| Pos. | Team | No. | SMP (New South Wales) | | SYM (Tasmania) | | | MEL (Victoria (state)) | | | | WAN (Western Australia) | | | WIN (Victoria (state)) | | | HID (Northern Territory) | | | TOW (Queensland) | | BEN (South Australia) | | | SAN (Victoria (state)) | | | PUK (New Zealand) | | | BAT (New South Wales) | SUR (Queensland) | | ADE (South Australia) | | Pen. | Pts. |
|---|---|---|---|---|---|---|---|---|---|---|---|---|---|---|---|---|---|---|---|---|---|---|---|---|---|---|---|---|---|---|---|---|---|---|---|---|---|---|
| 1 | Triple Eight Race Engineering | 88 | 9 | 11 | 5 | 2 | 8 | 8 | 14 | 6 | 12 | 5 | 8 | 11 | 10 | 12 | 7 | 8 | 13 | 6 | 7 | 6 | 7 | 6 | 5 | 14 | 10 | 3 | 7 | 8 | 4 | 5 | 14 | Ret | 8 | 1 | 0 | 5900 |
| 1 | Triple Eight Race Engineering | 97 | 1 | 6 | 1 | **1** | 1 | 3 | 1 | 1 | 20 | 1 | 5 | **1** | **2** | 1 | 2 | 3 | 3 | 21 | **1** | 1 | 1 | 1 | 1 | 2 | **1** | 1 | 5 | **1** | 1 | 1 | 1 | **1** | 20 | 7 | 0 | 5900 |
| 2 | Dick Johnson Racing | 11 | **2** | 3 | 6 | 5 | 3 | 23 | 20 | **4** | 3 | **2** | 2 | 4 | 8 | 10 | 8 | 1 | 4 | 2 | 6 | 2 | 9 | 5 | 7 | 3 | 8 | 24 | 6 | Ret | 5 | 7 | 6 | DSQ | 14 | **3** | 0 | 5172 |
| 2 | Dick Johnson Racing | 17 | 4 | 7 | 2 | 16 | **2** | 16 | **24** | 2 | **2** | 6 | **1** | 3 | 11 | 14 | 10 | **2** | 2 | **4** | 2 | 7 | 2 | 13 | 4 | **1** | 15 | **2** | 1 | 4 | **22** | Ret | 4 | 3 | 7 | 19 | 0 | 5172 |
| 3 | Tickford Racing | 5 | 10 | 17 | 12 | 8 | 9 | 20 | 9 | 9 | 22 | 7 | 7 | 2 | 13 | 8 | 27 | 9 | Ret | 19 | 20 | 4 | 14 | 3 | 12 | 6 | 13 | 12 | 18 | 16 | Ret | Ret | 8 | 17 | 3 | 17 | 0 | 4656 |
| 3 | Tickford Racing | 6 | 11 | 4 | **3** | 17 | 6 | 18 | 21 | 8 | 7 | 3 | 4 | 7 | 1 | **2** | **1** | 7 | **1** | 3 | 3 | **3** | 4 | **4** | **2** | 5 | 7 | 10 | **3** | 3 | 2 | **3** | 5 | 7 | **13** | 4 | 0 | 4656 |
| 4 | Walkinshaw Andretti United | 2 | 6 | 23 | 24 | 11 | 10 | 5 | 17 | 16 | 6 | 21 | 18 | 15 | 14 | 16 | 15 | 14 | 10 | 10 | 13 | 12 | 13 | Ret | 9 | 15 | 19 | 22 | 8 | 14 | 9 | 22 | 10 | Ret | 2 | 12 | 30 | 4448 |
| 4 | Walkinshaw Andretti United | 25 | 3 | 1 | 23 | 4 | 18 | 1 | 22 | 5 | 1 | 22 | 12 | 19 | 4 | 5 | 11 | DSQ | 8 | 1 | 9 | 5 | 3 | 2 | 8 | 10 | 2 | 4 | 4 | 2 | 6 | 2 | 3 | 2 | 1 | 2 | 30 | 4448 |
| 5 | Grove Racing | 10 | 21 | 16 | 9 | 9 | 14 | 22 | 3 | 13 | 10 | 11 | 21 | 12 | 5 | 4 | 6 | 15 | 12 | 16 | 17 | 23 | 15 | 22 | 10 | 24 | 18 | 18 | 12 | 12 | 14 | 6 | 15 | Ret | 10 | 9 | 0 | 3866 |
| 5 | Grove Racing | 26 | 24 | 9 | 21 | 3 | 4 | **2** | 2 | 3 | Ret | 4 | 11 | 6 | 3 | 3 | 4 | 25 | 5 | 12 | 18 | 11 | 8 | 8 | 22 | 12 | 4 | 9 | 9 | 7 | 8 | Ret | **2** | 4 | 11 | 15 | 0 | 3866 |
| 6 | Erebus Motorsport | 9 | 7 | 8 | 13 | 12 | 15 | 17 | 23 | 24 | 8 | 17 | Ret | 5 | 27 | 6 | 5 | Ret | 20 | 7 | 11 | 19 | 20 | 7 | 6 | 4 | 3 | 11 | 19 | Ret | DNS | 10 | 24 | 11 | 22 | 6 | 0 | 3856 |
| 6 | Erebus Motorsport | 99 | 5 | **2** | 4 | 19 | 22 | 14 | 7 | 15 | 5 | 8 | 6 | 21 | 7 | 11 | 13 | 10 | 16 | 24 | 12 | 16 | 6 | 24 | 3 | 11 | 23 | 16 | 20 | 18 | 19 | 4 | 7 | 5 | 4 | 8 | 0 | 3856 |
| 7 | Team 18 | 18 | 16 | 12 | 18 | 6 | 7 | 7 | 12 | 17 | 9 | 14 | 16 | 20 | 21 | 9 | 9 | 5 | 7 | 9 | 25 | 10 | 16 | 9 | 15 | 8 | 12 | 5 | 11 | 22 | 12 | 15 | 9 | 6 | 6 | 11 | 20 | 3401 |
| 7 | Team 18 | 20 | Ret | 15 | 7 | 7 | 13 | 11 | 4 | 25 | 11 | 19 | Ret | DNS | 6 | Ret | 14 | 6 | Ret | DNS | 5 | Ret | 12 | 20 | 13 | 7 | 5 | 7 | 10 | 5 | 7 | 16 | 17 | 12 | Ret | 14 | 20 | 3401 |
| 8 | Brad Jones Racing | 8 | 14 | 5 | 8 | Ret | 24 | 15 | Ret | 18 | 17 | 10 | 3 | 9 | 9 | 7 | 3 | 4 | 9 | 5 | 4 | 9 | 10 | Ret | DNS | 23 | 6 | 13 | 2 | 6 | 3 | Ret | Ret | 8 | 9 | 5 | 0 | 3260 |
| 8 | Brad Jones Racing | 14 | 12 | 19 | 15 | 18 | 21 | 10 | 10 | 22 | 19 | Ret | NC | 14 | 20 | 21 | 23 | 18 | 15 | 14 | 15 | 13 | 17 | 10 | 17 | 16 | 21 | 14 | 22 | 11 | 13 | 9 | 22 | 13 | 17 | Ret | 0 | 3260 |
| 9 | Matt Stone Racing | 34 | 13 | 22 | Ret | Ret | 23 | 25 | 15 | 12 | 16 | 16 | 17 | 13 | 18 | 13 | 17 | 13 | 6 | 13 | 10 | 14 | 21 | 15 | Ret | 19 | 25 | Ret | 23 | Ret | 21 | 14 | 13 | 16 | 18 | Ret | 80 | 2502 |
| 9 | Matt Stone Racing | 35 | 15 | 13 | 10 | 10 | 5 | 19 | 5 | 14 | 14 | 9 | 10 | 8 | 23 | 17 | 18 | 16 | 24 | 23 | 21 | 15 | 18 | 17 | 21 | 21 | 24 | 24 | 15 | 20 | 23 | 20 | 18 | Ret | Ret | 21 | 80 | 2502 |
| 10 | PremiAir Racing | 22 | 23 | 20 | 20 | 14 | 16 | 24 | 16 | 19 | 21 | 24 | 15 | 17 | 26 | 24 | 22 | 23 | 22 | 20 | 19 | 18 | 24 | 12 | 18 | 25 | 16 | 21 | 13 | 19 | 16 | 22 | 16 | 9 | 19 | 16 | 60 | 2418 |
| 10 | PremiAir Racing | 76 | 18 | Ret | 16 | DNS | 20 | 9 | 6 | 10 | 15 | 18 | 14 | Ret | 19 | Ret | 16 | 22 | 18 | 22 | | | | | | | | | | | | | | | | | 60 | 2418 |
| 10 | PremiAir Racing | 31 | | | | | | | | | | | | | | | | | | | 23 | 21 | 19 | 23 | 14 | 13 | 9 | 19 | 17 | 10 | 11 | 12 | 19 | Ret | Ret | 10 | 60 | 2418 |
| 11 | Brad Jones Racing | 4 | 17 | 18 | 17 | 20 | 17 | 13 | 19 | 21 | Ret | 23 | Ret | 18 | 22 | 23 | 26 | 24 | 19 | 17 | 24 | 20 | 26 | 21 | 19 | 20 | 22 | 15 | 14 | 17 | 20 | Ret | 21 | 14 | 21 | 20 | 0 | 2336 |
| 11 | Brad Jones Racing | 96 | 22 | 21 | 19 | 13 | 19 | 6 | 11 | 23 | 18 | 15 | 19 | 16 | 15 | 19 | 19 | 20 | 17 | 18 | 22 | 22 | 22 | 14 | 20 | 17 | 14 | 17 | Ret | 13 | 17 | 13 | 20 | Ret | 12 | 22 | 0 | 2336 |
| 12 | Tickford Racing | 55 | 20 | 14 | 22 | Ret | 12 | 21 | 18 | 11 | Ret | 12 | 20 | 22 | 12 | 18 | 12 | 19 | Ret | 15 | 16 | 17 | 11 | Ret | DNS | 9 | 17 | 8 | 16 | 21 | 18 | Ret | 11 | Ret | 15 | 18 | 30 | 2318 |
| 12 | Tickford Racing | 56 | 19 | 24 | 14 | Ret | 25 | 12 | 13 | 20 | 13 | 20 | 9 | Ret | 24 | 20 | 25 | 11 | 11 | 8 | 14 | 24 | 27 | 18 | Ret | 22 | 20 | 20 | 21 | 9 | 15 | 17 | 23 | 15 | 16 | Ret | 30 | 2318 |
| 13 | Blanchard Racing Team | 3 | 8 | 10 | 11 | 15 | 11 | 4 | 8 | 7 | 4 | 13 | 13 | 10 | 16 | 15 | 20 | 12 | 14 | 11 | 8 | 8 | 23 | 16 | 11 | 18 | 11 | 6 | Ret | 15 | 10 | 19 | 12 | 10 | 5 | 13 | 0 | 1855 |
| 14 | Triple Eight Race Engineering (w) | 888 | | | | | | | | | | | | | | | | | | | | | | | | | | | | | | 8 | | | | | 0 | 180 |
| 15 | Image Racing (w) | 49 | | | | | | | | | | | | | 25 | 25 | 24 | | | | | | 25 | 11 | 16 | | | | | | | | | | | | 0 | 168 |
| 16 | Tickford Racing (w) | 78 | | | | | | | | | | | | | | | | 21 | 21 | Ret | | | **5** | 19 | Ret | | | | | | | | | | | | 0 | 162 |
| 17 | Walkinshaw Andretti United (w) | 27 | | | | | | | | | | | | | 17 | 22 | 21 | 17 | 23 | Ret | | | | | | | | | | | | | | | | | 0 | 150 |
| 18 | Erebus Motorsport (w) | 51 | | | | | | | | | | | | | | | | | | | | | | | | | | | | | | 11 | | | | | 0 | 144 |
| 19 | Matt Chahda Motorsport (w) | 118 | | | | | | | | | | | | | | | | | | | | | | | | | | | | | | 18 | | | | | 0 | 102 |
| Pos. | Team | No. | SMP (New South Wales) | | SYM (Tasmania) | | | MEL (Victoria (state)) | | | | WAN (Western Australia) | | | WIN (Victoria (state)) | | | HID (Northern Territory) | | | TOW (Queensland) | | BEN (South Australia) | | | SAN (Victoria (state)) | | | PUK (New Zealand) | | | BAT (New South Wales) | SUR (Queensland) | | ADE (South Australia) | | Pen. | Pts. |

Key
| Colour | Result |
|---|---|
| Gold | Winner |
| Silver | Second place |
| Bronze | Third place |
| Green | Other points position |
| Blue | Other classified position |
| Blue | Not classified, finished (NC) |
| Purple | Not classified, retired (Ret) |
| Red | Did not qualify (DNQ) |
| Red | Did not pre-qualify (DNPQ) |
| Black | Disqualified (DSQ) |
| White | Did not start (DNS) |
| White | Race cancelled (C) |
| Blank | Did not practice (DNP) |
| Blank | Excluded (EX) |
| Blank | Did not arrive (DNA) |
| Blank | Withdrawn (WD) |
| Blank | Did not enter (cell empty) |
| Text formatting | Meaning |
| **Bold** | Pole position |
| Italics | Fastest lap |

- (w) denotes wildcard entry.
