= 2019 Tasmania SuperSprint =

2019 V8 Supercar championship race

2019 Tyrepower Tasmania SuperSprint
Event Information
- Round 3 of 15 in the 2019 Supercars Championship
- Date: 5–7 April 2019
- Location: Launceston, Tasmania
- Venue: Symmons Plains Raceway

Results
Race 1
Distance	50 laps	120.701 km
Pole position	(Australia) Mark Winterbottom; Team 18	50.6920
Winner	(New Zealand) Scott McLaughlin; DJR Team Penske	43:55.5209
Race 2
Distance	84 laps	202.777 km
Pole position	(New Zealand) Shane van Gisbergen; Triple Eight Race Engineering	50.6395
Winner	(New Zealand) Shane van Gisbergen; Triple Eight Race Engineering	1:14:12.5096

The 2019 Tyrepower Tasmania SuperSprint was a motor racing event for the Supercars Championship, held on the weekend of 5 to 7 April 2019. The event was held at Symmons Plains Raceway in Launceston, Tasmania, and was scheduled to consist of one race of 120 kilometres and one race of 200 kilometres in length. It was the third event of fifteen in the 2019 Supercars Championship and hosted Races 7 and 8 of the season. The event was the 47th running of the Tasmania SuperSprint.

Scott McLaughlin won Race 7 while Shane van Gisbergen won Race 8.

== Background ==
=== Entry alterations ===
The round was open to wildcard entries from the Super2 Series and saw the grid expand to twenty-five entries. Brad Jones Racing entered an extra Holden Commodore ZB for 19-year-old Jack Smith, who would make his debut in the category.

== Results ==
=== Practice ===
Practice summary
Session	Day	Fastest lap				
Session	Day	No.	Driver	Team	Car	Time
ADP	Friday	2	(Australia) Warren Luff	Walkinshaw Andretti United	Holden Commodore ZB	51.0641
Practice 1	Friday	55	(Australia) Chaz Mostert	Tickford Racing	Ford Mustang GT	50.7755
Practice 2	Friday	88	(Australia) Jamie Whincup	Triple Eight Race Engineering	Holden Commodore ZB	50.5084
Practice 3	Saturday	8	(Australia) Nick Percat	Brad Jones Racing	Holden Commodore ZB	50.6956
Practice 4	Sunday	17	(New Zealand) Scott McLaughlin	DJR Team Penske	Ford Mustang GT	50.5551

=== Race 7 ===
==== Qualifying ====
Pos.	No.	Driver	Team	Car	Time	Gap	Grid
1	18	(Australia) Mark Winterbottom	Team 18	Holden Commodore ZB	50.6920		1
2	17	(New Zealand) Scott McLaughlin	DJR Team Penske	Ford Mustang GT	50.6960	+0.004	2
3	97	(New Zealand) Shane van Gisbergen	Triple Eight Race Engineering	Holden Commodore ZB	50.7056	+0.0136	3
4	12	(New Zealand) Fabian Coulthard	DJR Team Penske	Ford Mustang GT	50.8235	+0.1315	4
5	9	(Australia) David Reynolds	Erebus Motorsport	Holden Commodore ZB	50.8289	+0.1369	5
6	22	(Australia) James Courtney	Walkinshaw Andretti United	Holden Commodore ZB	50.8626	+0.1706	6
7	14	(Australia) Tim Slade	Brad Jones Racing	Holden Commodore ZB	50.8774	+0.1854	7
8	99	(Australia) Anton de Pasquale	Erebus Motorsport	Holden Commodore ZB	50.8930	+0.201	8
9	5	(Australia) Lee Holdsworth	Tickford Racing	Ford Mustang GT	51.0566	+0.3646	9
10	6	(Australia) Cam Waters	Tickford Racing	Ford Mustang GT	51.0675	+0.3756	10
11	55	(Australia) Chaz Mostert	Tickford Racing	Ford Mustang GT	51.0394	+0.3475	11
12	8	(Australia) Nick Percat	Brad Jones Racing	Holden Commodore ZB	51.0452	+0.3533	12
13	23	(Australia) Will Davison	23Red Racing	Ford Mustang GT	51.0773	+0.3854	13
14	35	(Australia) Todd Hazelwood	Matt Stone Racing	Holden Commodore ZB	51.1736	+0.4816	14
15	88	(Australia) Jamie Whincup	Triple Eight Race Engineering	Holden Commodore ZB	no time^{1}	n/a	15
16	2	(Australia) Scott Pye	Walkinshaw Andretti United	Holden Commodore ZB	51.0200	+0.328	16
17	33	(New Zealand) Richie Stanaway	Garry Rogers Motorsport	Holden Commodore ZB	51.1110	+0.419	17
18	15	(Australia) Rick Kelly	Kelly Racing	Nissan Altima L33	51.1618	+0.4698	18
19	34	(Australia) James Golding	Garry Rogers Motorsport	Holden Commodore ZB	51.1744	+0.4824	19
20	19	(Australia) Jack Le Brocq	Tekno Autosports	Holden Commodore ZB	51.1969	+0.5049	20
21	21	(Australia) Macauley Jones	Tim Blanchard Racing	Holden Commodore ZB	51.3077	+0.6157	21
22	4	(Australia) Jack Smith	Brad Jones Racing	Holden Commodore ZB	51.4931	+0.8011	22
23	78	(Switzerland) Simona de Silvestro	Kelly Racing	Nissan Altima L33	51.5012	+0.8092	23
24	3	(Australia) Garry Jacobson	Kelly Racing	Nissan Altima L33	51.5486	+0.8566	24
25	7	(New Zealand) Andre Heimgartner	Kelly Racing	Nissan Altima L33	no time		25

Notes

- ^1 - Jamie Whincup had his fastest lap time revoked and was barred from taking further part in qualifying after triggering a red flag in Q2.

==== Race ====
Pos.	No.	Driver	Team	Car	Laps	Time / Retired	Grid	Points
1	17	(New Zealand) Scott McLaughlin	DJR Team Penske	Ford Mustang GT	50	43:55.5208	2	150
2	12	(New Zealand) Fabian Coulthard	DJR Team Penske	Ford Mustang GT	50	+1.764	4	138
3	97	(New Zealand) Shane van Gisbergen	Triple Eight Race Engineering	Holden Commodore ZB	50	+4.818	3	129
4	18	(Australia) Mark Winterbottom	Team 18	Holden Commodore ZB	50	+5.597	1	120
5	22	(Australia) James Courtney	Walkinshaw Andretti United	Holden Commodore ZB	50	+11.023	6	111
6	9	(Australia) David Reynolds	Erebus Motorsport	Holden Commodore ZB	50	+13.616	5	102
7	14	(Australia) Tim Slade	Brad Jones Racing	Holden Commodore ZB	50	+14.262	7	96
8	8	(Australia) Nick Percat	Brad Jones Racing	Holden Commodore ZB	50	+18.508	12	90
9	99	(Australia) Anton de Pasquale	Erebus Motorsport	Holden Commodore ZB	50	+19.620	8	84
10	55	(Australia) Chaz Mostert	Tickford Racing	Ford Mustang GT	50	+20.007	11	78
11	6	(Australia) Cam Waters	Tickford Racing	Ford Mustang GT	50	+20.453	10	72
12	2	(Australia) Scott Pye	Walkinshaw Andretti United	Holden Commodore ZB	50	+20.955	16	69
13	5	(Australia) Lee Holdsworth	Tickford Racing	Ford Mustang GT	50	+21.225	9	66
14	35	(Australia) Todd Hazelwood	Matt Stone Racing	Holden Commodore ZB	50	+29.148	14	63
15	34	(Australia) James Golding	Garry Rogers Motorsport	Holden Commodore ZB	50	+29.680	19	60
16	33	(New Zealand) Richie Stanaway	Garry Rogers Motorsport	Holden Commodore ZB	50	+30.248	17	57
17	15	(Australia) Rick Kelly	Kelly Racing	Nissan Altima L33	50	+30.772	18	54
18	7	(New Zealand) Andre Heimgartner	Kelly Racing	Nissan Altima L33	50	+33.129	25	51
19	23	(Australia) Will Davison	23Red Racing	Ford Mustang GT	50	+34.509	13	48
20	21	(Australia) Macauley Jones	Tim Blanchard Racing	Holden Commodore ZB	50	+40.635	21	45
21	78	(Switzerland) Simona de Silvestro	Kelly Racing	Nissan Altima L33	50	+44.883	23	42
22	19	(Australia) Jack Le Brocq	Tekno Autosports	Holden Commodore ZB	49	+1 lap	20	39
23	4	(Australia) Jack Smith	Brad Jones Racing	Holden Commodore ZB	49	+1 lap	22	36
24	3	(Australia) Garry Jacobson	Kelly Racing	Nissan Altima L33	49	+1 lap	24	33
25	88	(Australia) Jamie Whincup	Triple Eight Race Engineering	Holden Commodore ZB	48	+2 laps	15	30

=== Race 8 ===
==== Qualifying ====
Pos.	No.	Driver	Team	Car	Time	Gap	Grid
1	97	(New Zealand) Shane van Gisbergen	Triple Eight Race Engineering	Holden Commodore ZB	50.6395		1
2	12	(New Zealand) Fabian Coulthard	DJR Team Penske	Ford Mustang GT	50.7048	+0.0653	2
3	9	(Australia) David Reynolds	Erebus Motorsport	Holden Commodore ZB	50.7391	+0.0996	3
4	18	(Australia) Mark Winterbottom	Team 18	Holden Commodore ZB	50.7889	+0.1494	4
5	17	(New Zealand) Scott McLaughlin	DJR Team Penske	Ford Mustang GT	50.8471	+0.2076	5
6	99	(Australia) Anton de Pasquale	Erebus Motorsport	Holden Commodore ZB	50.8805	+0.241	6
7	33	(New Zealand) Richie Stanaway	Garry Rogers Motorsport	Holden Commodore ZB	50.8951	+0.2556	7
8	6	(Australia) Cam Waters	Tickford Racing	Ford Mustang GT	50.9412	+0.3017	8
9	22	(Australia) James Courtney	Walkinshaw Andretti United	Holden Commodore ZB	50.9530	+0.3135	9
10	55	(Australia) Chaz Mostert	Tickford Racing	Ford Mustang GT	51.8510	+1.2115	10
11	15	(Australia) Rick Kelly	Kelly Racing	Nissan Altima L33	50.9975	+0.358	11
12	14	(Australia) Tim Slade	Brad Jones Racing	Holden Commodore ZB	50.9982	+0.3587	12
13	88	(Australia) Jamie Whincup	Triple Eight Race Engineering	Holden Commodore ZB	51.0183	+0.3788	13
14	5	(Australia) Lee Holdsworth	Tickford Racing	Ford Mustang GT	51.0718	+0.4323	14
15	2	(Australia) Scott Pye	Walkinshaw Andretti United	Holden Commodore ZB	51.1228	+0.4833	15
16	8	(Australia) Nick Percat	Brad Jones Racing	Holden Commodore ZB	51.3009	+0.6614	16
17	35	(Australia) Todd Hazelwood	Matt Stone Racing	Holden Commodore ZB	51.3331	+0.6936	17
18	7	(New Zealand) Andre Heimgartner	Kelly Racing	Nissan Altima L33	51.4766	+0.8371	18
19	34	(Australia) James Golding	Garry Rogers Motorsport	Holden Commodore ZB	51.5143	+0.8748	19
20	19	(Australia) Jack Le Brocq	Tekno Autosports	Holden Commodore ZB	51.5946	+0.9551	20
21	4	(Australia) Jack Smith	Brad Jones Racing	Holden Commodore ZB	51.6548	+1.0153	21
22	3	(Australia) Garry Jacobson	Kelly Racing	Nissan Altima L33	51.7046	+1.0651	22
23	78	(Switzerland) Simona de Silvestro	Kelly Racing	Nissan Altima L33	51.7276	+1.0881	23
24	23	(Australia) Will Davison	23Red Racing	Ford Mustang GT	52.4571	+1.8176	24
25	21	(Australia) Macauley Jones	Tim Blanchard Racing	Holden Commodore ZB	no time^{1}		25

Notes

- ^1 - Macauley Jones had his fastest lap time revoked and was barred from taking further part in qualifying after triggering a red flag in Q1.

==== Race ====
Pos.	No.	Driver	Team	Car	Laps	Time / Retired	Grid	Points
1	97	(New Zealand) Shane van Gisbergen	Triple Eight Race Engineering	Holden Commodore ZB	84	01:14:12.5096	1	150
2	12	(New Zealand) Fabian Coulthard	DJR Team Penske	Ford Mustang GT	84	+5.188	2	138
3	9	(Australia) David Reynolds	Erebus Motorsport	Holden Commodore ZB	84	+6.878	3	129
4	17	(New Zealand) Scott McLaughlin	DJR Team Penske	Ford Mustang GT	84	+13.849	5	120
5	88	(Australia) Jamie Whincup	Triple Eight Race Engineering	Holden Commodore ZB	84	+16.639	13	111
6	18	(Australia) Mark Winterbottom	Team 18	Holden Commodore ZB	84	+18.143	4	102
7	8	(Australia) Nick Percat	Brad Jones Racing	Holden Commodore ZB	84	+31.506	16	96
8	2	(Australia) Scott Pye	Walkinshaw Andretti United	Holden Commodore ZB	84	+34.967	15	90
9	5	(Australia) Lee Holdsworth	Tickford Racing	Ford Mustang GT	84	+36.134	14	84
10	55	(Australia) Chaz Mostert	Tickford Racing	Ford Mustang GT	84	+41.887	10	78
11	6	(Australia) Cam Waters	Tickford Racing	Ford Mustang GT	84	+44.332	8	72
12	14	(Australia) Tim Slade	Brad Jones Racing	Holden Commodore ZB	84	+44.624	12	69
13	22	(Australia) James Courtney	Walkinshaw Andretti United	Holden Commodore ZB	84	+48.633	9	66
14	23	(Australia) Will Davison	23Red Racing	Ford Mustang GT	84	+51.529	24	63
15	15	(Australia) Rick Kelly	Kelly Racing	Nissan Altima L33	83	+1 lap	11	60
16	34	(Australia) James Golding	Garry Rogers Motorsport	Holden Commodore ZB	83	+1 lap	19	57
17	7	(New Zealand) Andre Heimgartner	Kelly Racing	Nissan Altima L33	83	+1 lap	18	54
18	35	(Australia) Todd Hazelwood	Matt Stone Racing	Holden Commodore ZB	83	+1 lap	17	51
19	33	(New Zealand) Richie Stanaway	Garry Rogers Motorsport	Holden Commodore ZB	83	+1 lap	7	48
20	21	(Australia) Macauley Jones	Tim Blanchard Racing	Holden Commodore ZB	83	+1 lap	25	45
21	78	(Switzerland) Simona de Silvestro	Kelly Racing	Nissan Altima L33	83	+1 lap	23	42
22	19	(Australia) Jack Le Brocq	Tekno Autosports	Holden Commodore ZB	83	+1 lap	20	39
23	99	(Australia) Anton de Pasquale	Erebus Motorsport	Holden Commodore ZB	82	+2 laps	6	36
24	4	(Australia) Jack Smith	Brad Jones Racing	Holden Commodore ZB	81	+3 laps	21	33
Ret	3	(Australia) Garry Jacobson	Kelly Racing	Nissan Altima L33	62	Electrical	22	
