= Anton De Pasquale =

Australian motor racing driver

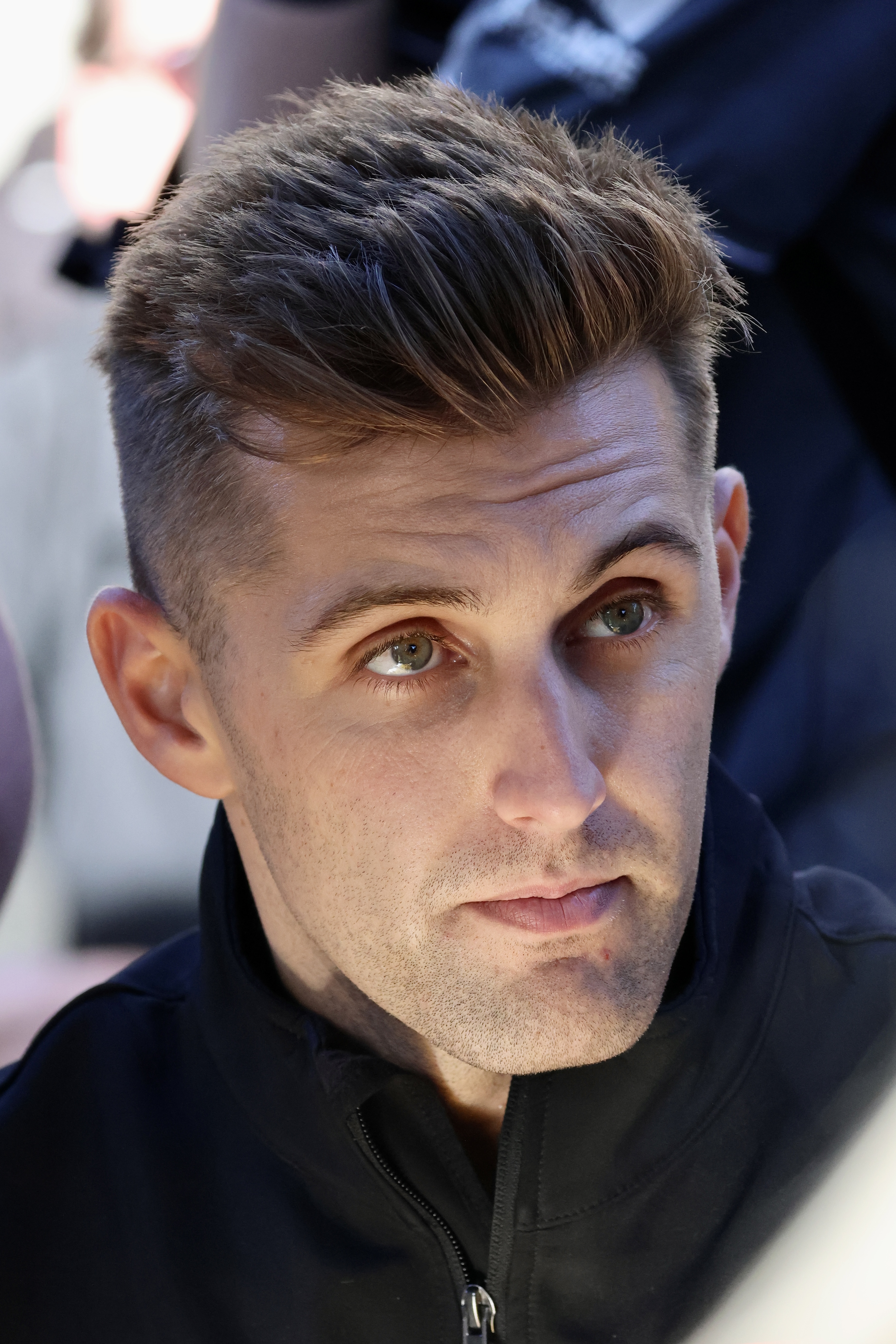
- De Pasquale at the Adelaide Grand Final in 2025
- Nationality: (Australia) Australian
- Born: 14 September 1995 (age 31) Werribee South, Victoria
- Categorisation: FIA Silver (until 2023); FIA Gold (2024–)

Previous series
- 2016-17 2015 2014 2012-13 2012: Dunlop Super2 Series; Eurocup Formula Renault 2.0; Formula Renault 1.6 NEC; Australian Formula Ford; Victorian Formula Ford

Championship titles
- 2011 2014 2013: Australian Kart Champion; Formula Renault 1.6 NEC; Australian Formula Ford

Awards
- 2014 2018: Motorsport Australia Young Driver of the Year; Peter Brock Medal

Supercars Championship career
- Current team: Team 18
- Championships: 0
- Races: 266
- Wins: 11
- Podiums: 42
- Pole positions: 17
- 2026 position: 6th (1535 pts)

Anton De Pasquale (born 14 September 1995) is an Australian motor racing driver. He currently drives the No. 18 Chevrolet Camaro ZL1 for Team 18 in the Repco Supercars Championship. He briefly raced in various Formula Renault series in Europe and the Dunlop Super2 Series.

== Career ==
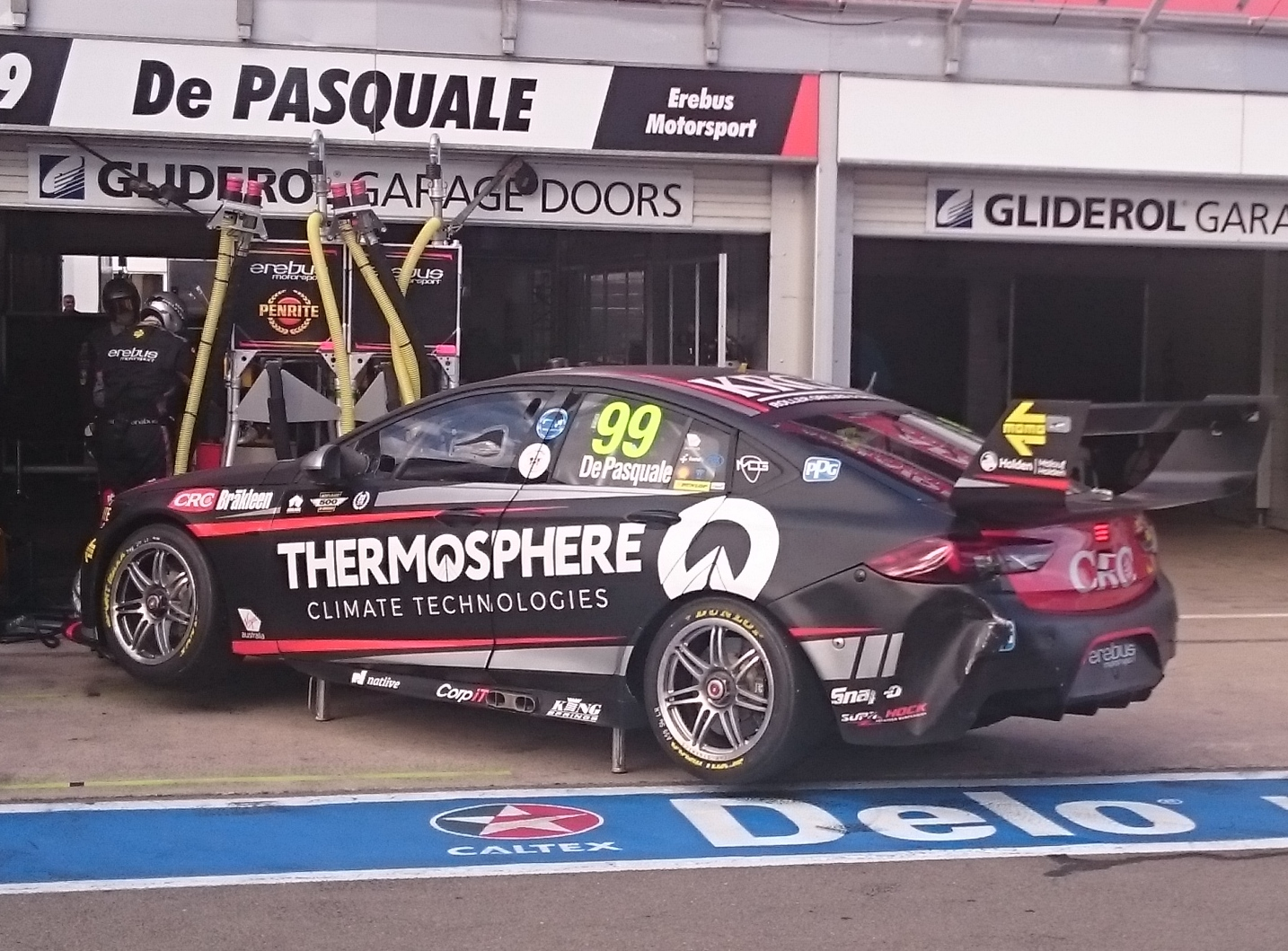
The Holden Commodore ZB of Anton de Pasquale at the 2018 Adelaide 500

=== Karting ===
De Pasquale competed in the Australian National Sprint Kart Championship from 2010 to 2011, winning the championship in 2011.

=== Formula Ford ===
De Pasquale raced in the Victorian Formula Ford Championship, taking second place in the championship. He then moved to the Australian Formula Ford Championship, where he raced for two seasons, eventually winning the championship in 2013.

=== Formula Renault ===
De Pasquale then moved to Europe to compete in the Formula Renault 1.6 NEC Championship, winning seven races and gaining three podiums and winning the championship.

De Pasquale then shifted to the Eurocup Formula Renault 2.0 racing for Koiranen GP for all but five races. He scored four points and ended the season in 18th place.

=== Supercars Dunlop Series ===
De Pasquale then moved back into Australia to compete in the 2016 Supercars Dunlop Series racing for Paul Morris Motorsport. He scored one podium and finished in eleventh place in the standings. In 2017, he finished fourth.

=== Erebus Motorsport ===
For the 2018 Supercars Championship, de Pasquale moved to Erebus Motorsport on a multi year deal. He had his first win at Hidden Valley Raceway in 2020.

=== Dick Johnson Racing ===
De Pasquale moved to DJR Team Penske in 2021 for four years, taking eight wins.

=== Team 18 ===
For the 2025 Supercars Championship, De Pasquale moved to Team 18. De Pasquale finished 8th in the championship in his first season with the team, achieving three podiums.

De Pasquale began his second season with Team 18 with the team taking on the role as the Chevrolet homologation team. De Pasquale started the season strongly at the first round of the Championship, the Sydney 500, claiming pole position for race 2 and converting it into the race victory. It was both his first pole position and race win for Team 18. Over the following rounds, De Pasquale established himself as the lead Chevrolet driver in the championship, and picked up his second win of the season at Hidden Valley, in race 19 of the championship. This victory was the first of four podium finishes in seven races, followed by driving from eleventh on the grid to finish second at the Townsville 500, and then twice finishing third at the Perth Super 440. On the last lap of the 2026 Bathurst 1000, De Pasquale was leading the race, but ran out of fuel while going up mountain straight, giving the win to Brodie Kostecki and Todd Hazelwood.

== Career results ==
=== Karting career summary ===
Season	Series	Position
2010	Australian National Sprint Kart Championship - Junior National Heavy	5th
2010	Australian National Sprint Kart Championship - Junior Clubman	4th
2010	Queensland Kart Championship - Junior National Heavy	4th
2010	Champion of Champions Junior Classic - Junior Clubman	**1st**
2010	Champion of Champions Junior Classic - Junior Max	**1st**
2010	Victorian Country Karting Championship - Junior National Heavy	**2nd**
2010	Victorian Country Karting Championship - Junior Clubman	**1st**
2010	New South Wales Karting Championship - Junior Clubman	4th
2010	South Australian Karting Championship - Junior Max	5th
2010	Tasmanian Karting Championship - Junior National Heavy	**2nd**
2010	Tasmanian Karting Championship - Junior Clubman	**1st**
2010	Victorian Junior Karter of the year	**1st**
2010	Victorian Closed Karting Championship - Junior Clubman	**1st**
2010	Victorian Closed Karting Championship - Junior National Heavy	**1st**
2011	Australian National Sprint Kart Championship - Junior National Heavy	**1st**
2011	Australian National Sprint Kart Championship - Junior Clubman	**2nd**
2011	South Australian Karting Championship - Junior Clubman	**2nd**
2011	Tasmanian Karting Championship - Junior National Heavy	**1st**
2011	Tasmanian Karting Championship - Junior National Heavy	**1st**
2011	Tasmanian Karting Championship - Junior Clubman	**1st**
2011	City of Melbourne Titles - Junior Clubman	**2nd**
2011	City of Melbourne Titles - Junior National Heavy	**1st**
2011	Victorian Junior Karter of the year	**1st**
2011	Oakleigh Kart Club Top Guns - Junior National Heavy	**1st**

=== Circuit career ===
Season	Series	Position	Car	Team
2012	Victorian Formula Ford Championship	**2nd**	Mygale SJ08	
2012	Australian Formula Ford Championship	7th	Mygale SJ08a	Sonic Motor Racing Services
2013	Australian Formula Ford Championship	**1st**	Mygale SJ13a	Sonic Motor Racing Services
2014	Formula Renault 1.6 NEC	**1st**	Signatech FR1.6	Lechner Racing School
2015	Eurocup Formula Renault 2.0	18th	Renault FR 2.0-10	Koiranen GP
2015	Formula Renault 2.0 Alps	NC†	Renault FR 2.0-10	Koiranen GP
2016	Supercars Dunlop Series	11th	Ford FG Falcon	Paul Morris Motorsport
2017	Dunlop Super2 Series	4th	Ford FG X Falcon	Paul Morris Motorsport
2017	Kumho Tyres V8 Touring Car Series	10th	Ford FG Falcon	Paul Morris Motorsport
2018	Virgin Australia Supercars Championship	20th	Holden ZB Commodore	Erebus Motorsport
2019	Virgin Australia Supercars Championship	14th	Holden ZB Commodore	Erebus Motorsport
2020	Virgin Australia Supercars Championship	8th	Holden ZB Commodore	Erebus Motorsport
2021	Repco Supercars Championship	6th	Ford Mustang GT S550	Dick Johnson Racing
2022	Repco Supercars Championship	4th	Ford Mustang GT S550	Dick Johnson Racing
2023	Repco Supercars Championship	8th	Ford Mustang GT S650	Dick Johnson Racing
2024	Repco Supercars Championship	11th	Ford Mustang GT S650	Dick Johnson Racing
2025	Repco Supercars Championship	8th	Chevrolet Camaro ZL1	Team 18

=== Complete Formula Renault 1.6 Northern European Cup results ===
(key) (Races in bold indicate pole position) (Races in italics indicate fastest lap)

Year	Entrant	1	2	3	4	5	6	7	8	9	10	11	12	13	14	15	Pos	Points
2014	Lechner Racing School	**ZAN**; **1**; **1**	**ZAN**; **2**; **1**	SPA; 1; 2	SPA; 2; 2	**NÜR**; **NC**; **1**	**NÜR**; **NC**; **1**	**ASN**; **1**; **1**	**ASN**; **1**; **2**	ZOL; 1; 4	ZOL; 2; 1	SPA; 1; 1	SPA; 2; 6	**ZAN**; **1**; **1**	**ZAN**; **2**; **1**	**ZAN**; **3**; **7**	1st	328

=== Complete Eurocup Formula Renault 2.0 results ===
(key) (Races in bold indicate pole position) (Races in italics indicate fastest lap)

Year	Entrant	1	2	3	4	5	6	7	8	9	10	11	12	13	14	15	16	17	Pos	Points
2015	Koiranen GP	ALC; 1; 21	ALC; 2; 15	ALC; 3; 20	SPA; 1 Ret	SPA; 2; 20	HUN; 1; 8	HUN; 2 Ret	SIL; 1; 17	SIL; 2; 21	SIL; 3; 19	NÜR; 1; 17	NÜR; 2; 14	LMS; 1	LMS; 2	JER; 1	JER; 2	JER; 3	18th	4

=== Complete Formula Renault 2.0 Alps Series results ===
(key) (Races in bold indicate pole position; races in italics indicate fastest lap)

Year	Team	1	2	3	4	5	6	7	8	9	10	11	12	13	14	15	16	Pos	Points
2015	Koiranen GP	IMO; 1	IMO; 2	PAU; 1	PAU; 2	RBR; 1 Ret	RBR; 2; 4	RBR; 3; 5	SPA; 1	SPA; 2	MNZ; 1	MNZ; 2	MNZ; 3	MIS; 1	MIS; 2	JER; 1	JER; 2	NC†	0

† As de Pasquale was a guest driver, he was ineligible for points

=== Super3 Series results ===
(key) (Races in bold indicate pole position) (Races in italics indicate fastest lap)

Year	Team	No.	Car	1	2	3	4	5	6	7	8	9	10	11	12	13	14	15	Position	Points
2017	Paul Morris Motorsport	67	Ford FG Falcon	PHI; R1	PHI; R2	PHI; R3	WIN; R4	WIN; R5	WIN; R6	QLD; R7; 3	QLD; R8; 2	QLD; R9; 2	PHI; R10	PHI; R11	PHI; R12	SMP; R13	SMP; R14	SMP; R15	10th	119

=== Super2 Series results ===
(key) (Races in bold indicate pole position) (Races in italics indicate fastest lap)

Year	Team	No.	Car	1	2	3	4	5	6	7	8	9	10	11	12	13	14	15	16	17	18	19	20	21	Position	Points
2016	Paul Morris Motorsport	67	Ford FG Falcon	ADE; R1; 8	ADE; R2; 12	PHI; R3; 13	PHI; R4; 14	PHI; R5; 10	BAR; R6; 6	BAR; R7; 18	BAR; R8; 14	TOW; R9; Ret	TOW; R10; 9	SAN; R11; Ret	SAN; R12; 9	SAN; R13; 14	BAT; R14; 3	HOM; R15; 7	HOM; R16; 8						11th	1042
2017	Paul Morris Motorsport	67	Ford FG Falcon	ADE; R1; Ret	ADE; R2; 13	ADE; R3; 9	SYM; R4; 6	SYM; R5; 8	SYM; R6; 20	SYM; R7; 10	PHI; R8; 4	PHI; R9; 4	PHI; R10; 2	PHI; R11; 1	TOW; R12; 6	TOW; R13; 2	SYD; R14; 2	SYD; R15; 2	SYD; R16; 1	**SYD**; **R17**; 4	SAN; R18; 4	**SAN**; **R19**; 16	NEW; R20; Ret	NEW; R21; 5	4th	1322

=== Supercars Championship results ===
Supercars results
Year	Team	No.	Car	1	2	3	4	5	6	7	8	9	10	11	12	13	14	15	16	17	18	19	20	21	22	23	24	25	26	27	28	29	30	31	32	33	34	35	36	37	Position	Points
2018	Erebus Motorsport	99	Holden ZB Commodore	ADE; R1; 19	ADE; R2; 17	MEL; R3; 15	MEL; R4; 19	MEL; R5; 20	MEL; R6; 15	SYM; R7; 19	SYM; R8; 15	PHI; R9; 7	PHI; R10; 16	BAR; R11; 18	BAR; R12; 23	WIN; R13; 12	WIN; R14; 16	HID; R15; 11	HID; R16; 16	TOW; R17; 19	TOW; R18; 17	QLD; R19; 26	QLD; R20; 16	SMP; R21; 18	BEN; R22; 24	BEN; R23; 11	SAN; QR; 9	SAN; R24; 18	BAT; R25; 24	SUR; R26; Ret	SUR; R27; C	PUK; R28; 19	PUK; R29; 24	NEW; R30; 11	NEW; R31; 16						20th	1524
2019	Erebus Motorsport	99	Holden ZB Commodore	ADE; R1; 16	ADE; R2; 14	MEL; R3; 11	MEL; R4; 13	MEL; R5; 11	MEL; R6; 12	SYM; R7; 9	SYM; R8; 23	PHI; R9; 12	PHI; R10; 3	BAR; R11; 13	BAR; R12; 7	WIN; R13; 18	WIN; R14; 17	HID; R15; 11	HID; R16; 8	TOW; R17; 11	TOW; R18; 4	QLD; R19; 14	QLD; R20; 11	BEN; R21; 3	BEN; R22; 7	PUK; R23; 15	PUK; R24; 20	BAT; R25; Ret	SUR; R26; 11	SUR; R27; 8	SAN; QR; 13	SAN; R28; 10	NEW; R29; 23	NEW; R30; Ret							14th	2015
2020	Erebus Motorsport	99	Holden ZB Commodore	ADE; R1; 14	ADE; R2; Ret	MEL; R3; C	MEL; R4; C	MEL; R5; C	MEL; R6; C	SMP1; R7; 8	SMP1; R8; 12	SMP1; R9; 7	SMP2; R10; 3	SMP2; R11; 13	SMP2; R12; 19	HID1; R13; 1	HID1; R14; 7	HID1; R15; 23	HID2; R16; 6	HID2; R17; 12	HID2; R18; 9	TOW1; R19; 10	TOW1; R20; 8	TOW1; R21; 7	TOW2; R22; 5	TOW2; R23; 16	TOW2; R24; Ret	BEN1; R25; 8	BEN1; R26; 5	BEN1; R27; 4	BEN2; R28; 5	BEN2; R29; 2	BEN2; R30; 11	BAT; R31; 9							8th	1637
2021	Dick Johnson Racing	11	Ford Mustang GT	BAT1; R1; Ret	BAT1; R2; 4	SAN; R3; 5	SAN; R4; Ret	SAN; R5; 12	SYM; R6; 3	SYM; R7; 13	SYM; R8; 2	BEN; R9; 3	**BEN**; **R10**; **1**	**BEN**; **R11**; **Ret**	**HID**; **R12**; **Ret**	HID; R13; 6	HID; R14; 12	TOW1; R15; 3	TOW1; R16; 3	TOW2; R17; 8	TOW2; R18; 5	**TOW2**; **R19**; **2**	**SMP1**; **R20**; **1**	**SMP1**; **R21**; **DSQ**	**SMP1**; **R22**; **1**	SMP2; R23; 12	**SMP2**; **R24**; **1**	SMP2; R25; 2	**SMP3**; **R26**; **1**	**SMP3**; **R27**; **1**	SMP3; R28; 9	SMP4; R29; 4	SMP4; R30; C	BAT2; R31; Ret							6th	2075
2022	Dick Johnson Racing	11	Ford Mustang GT	**SMP**; **R1**; **2**	SMP; R2; 3	SYM; R3; 6	SYM; R4; 5	SYM; R5; 3	MEL; R6; 23	MEL; R7; 20	**MEL**; **R8**; **4**	MEL; R9; 3	**BAR**; **R10**; **2**	BAR; R11; 2	BAR; R12; 4	WIN; R13; 8	WIN; R14; 10	WIN; R15; 8	HID; R16; 1	HID; R17; 4	HID; R18; 2	TOW; R19; 6	TOW; R20; 2	BEN; R21; 9	BEN; R22; 7	BEN; R23; 5	SAN; R24; 3	SAN; R25; 8	SAN; R26; 23	PUK; R27; 6	PUK; R28; Ret	PUK; R29; 5	BAT; R30; 7	SUR; R31; 6	**SUR**; **R32**; **DSQ**	ADE; R33; 14	ADE; R34; 3				4th	2599
2023	Dick Johnson Racing	11	Ford Mustang GT S650	NEW; R1; 16	NEW; R2; 16	**MEL**; **R3**; **6**	MEL; R4; 5	MEL; R5; Ret	MEL; R6; 22	BAR; R7; 13	BAR; R8; 22	BAR; R9; 15	SYM; R10; 13	SYM; R11; 14	SYM; R12; 9	HID; R13; 9	HID; R14; 17	HID; R15; 17	TOW; R16; Ret	TOW; R17; 1	SMP; R18; 15	SMP; R19; 3	BEN; R20; 11	BEN; R21; 7	BEN; R22; 7	SAN; R23; 8	BAT; R24; 3	SUR; R25; 13	SUR; R26; 21	ADE; R27; 21	ADE; R28; 7										8th	1818
2024	Dick Johnson Racing	11	Ford Mustang GT S650	BAT1; R1; 21	BAT1; R2; 15	MEL; R3; 7	MEL; R4; Ret	MEL; R5; 16	MEL; R6; DNS	TAU; R7; 3	TAU; R8; 3	BAR; R9; 9	BAR; R10; 6	HID; R11; 9	HID; R12; 8	TOW; R13; Ret	TOW; R14; 13	SMP; R15; 5	SMP; R16; 5	SYM; R17; 13	SYM; R18; 14	SAN; R19; 14	BAT2; R20; 7	SUR; R21; 11	SUR; R22; Ret	ADE; R23; 9	ADE; R24; 15														11th	1747
2025	Team 18	18	Chevrolet Camaro ZL1	SYD; R1; 8	SYD; R2; 7	SYD; R3; 7	MEL; R4; 7	MEL; R5; 8	MEL; R6; 7	MEL; R7; C	TAU; R8; 4	TAU; R9; 20	TAU; R10; 16	SYM; R11; 17	SYM; R12; 17	SYM; R13; 23	BAR; R14; 19	BAR; R15; 9	BAR; R16; 18	HID; R17; 14	HID; R18; 2	HID; R19; 7	TOW; R20; 3	TOW; R21; 6	TOW; R22; 6	QLD; R23; 8	QLD; R24; 4	QLD; R25; 8	BEN; R26; 10	BAT; R27; 20	SUR; R28; 8	SUR; R29; 16	SAN; R30; 8	SAN; R31; 2	ADE; R32; 8	ADE; R33; 13	ADE; R34; 5				8th	3557
2026	Team 18	18	Chevrolet Camaro ZL1	SMP; R1; 6	**SMP**; **R2**; **1**	SMP; R3; 15	MEL; R4; 9	MEL; R5; 10	MEL; R6; 6	MEL; R7; 12	TAU; R8; 8	TAU; R9; 10	CHR; R10; 5	CHR; R11; 6	CHR; R12; 6	CHR; R13; 11	SYM; R14; 6	SYM; R15; 5	SYM; R16; 4	HID; R17; 6	HID; R18; 8	HID; R19; 1	TOW; R20; 14	TOW; R21; 2	TOW; R22; 13	BAR; R23; 3	BAR; R24; 11	BAR; R25; 3	QLD; R26; 13	QLD; R27; 10	QLD; R28; 6	BEN; R28; 7	BAT; R30; Ret	SUR; R31	SUR; R32	SAN; R33	SAN; R34	ADE; R35	ADE; R36	ADE; R37	6th*	1417*

=== Bathurst 1000 results ===
Year	Team	Car	Co-driver	Position	Laps
2018	Erebus Motorsport	Holden Commodore ZB	(Australia) Will Brown	24th	143
2019	Erebus Motorsport	Holden Commodore ZB	(Australia) Will Brown	DNF	125
2020	Erebus Motorsport	Holden Commodore ZB	(Australia) Brodie Kostecki	9th	161
2021	Dick Johnson Racing	Ford Mustang S550	(Australia) Tony D'Alberto	DNF	139
2022	Dick Johnson Racing	Ford Mustang S550	(Australia) Tony D'Alberto	7th	161
2023	Dick Johnson Racing	Ford Mustang S650	(Australia) Tony D'Alberto	**3rd**	161
2024	Dick Johnson Racing	Ford Mustang S650	(Australia) Tony D'Alberto	7th	161
2025	Team 18	Chevrolet Camaro ZL1	(Australia) Harri Jones	20th	141
2026	Team 18	Chevrolet Camaro ZL1	(Australia) Lee Holdsworth	DNF	160

=== Complete S5000 results ===
Year	Series	Team	1	2	3	4	5	6	Position	Points
2019	Exhibition	Team BRM	SAN; R1	SAN; R2	SAN; M	**BMP**; **R1**; **2**	BMP; R2; 7	BMP; M 4	-	N/C

=== Bathurst 12 Hours results ===
Year	Team	Co-drivers	Car	Class	Laps	Ovr. pos.	Class pos.
2019	MARC Cars Australia	(Papua New Guinea) Keith Kassulke (Australia) Paul Morris (Canada) Paul Tracy	MARC Ford Mustang II	I	189	DNF	DNF
2020	(Australia) Triple Eight Race Engineering	(Australia) Nick Foster (Australia) Sam Shahin (Australia) Yasser Shahin	Mercedes-AMG GT3	A	0	WD	Crash in Q1
2023	(Australia) Grove Racing	(Australia) Brenton Grove (Australia) Stephen Grove	Porsche 911 GT3 R	A	56	DNF	DNF

=== Bathurst 6 Hour results ===
Year	Team	Co-drivers	Car	Class	Laps	Pos.	Class pos.
2025	(Australia) VSP	(Australia) Tom Shaw (Australia) Zaki Wazir	BMW M4 F82	X	120	11th	6th

Sporting positions
Preceded by Jack Le Brocq	Australian Formula Ford Championship; 2013	Succeeded by Thomas Randle
Preceded by Roy Geerts	Formula Renault 1.6 NEC; 2014	Succeeded by Incumbent
Awards and achievements
Preceded by Inaugural	Motorsport Australia; Young Driver of the Year Award; 2014	Succeeded by Joey Mawson
Preceded by Will Brown	Peter Brock Medal; 2018	Succeeded by Harry Bates
Preceded by Shane van Gisbergen	Jason Richards Memorial Trophy; 2024	Succeeded by Matt Payne
