= Jack Smith (Australian racing driver) =

Australian racing driver

- Nationality: Australian
- Born: 9 July 1999 (age 27) Gold Coast, Queensland
- Relatives: Tommy Smith (nephew)

Supercars Championship career
- Current team: Brad Jones Racing
- Championships: 0
- Races: 134
- Wins: 0
- Podiums: 0
- Pole positions: 0
- 2022 position: 24th (1054 pts)

Jack Smith (born 9 July 1999, on the Gold Coast) is an Australian racing driver. He retired from racing full-time in the Supercars Championship at the end of the 2023 season and will become an endurance driver from 2024 onwards.

Smith made his Supercars Championship debut as a wildcard entry at the 2019 Tasmania SuperSprint for Brad Jones Racing and will continue on with the team.

== Personal life ==
Smith is the youngest son of Peter Smith, founder of the Specialized Container Transport (SCT) Group.

== Career results ==
Season	Series	Position	Car	Team
2016	Australian GT Trophy Series - MARC class	**2nd**	MARC Ford Focus V8	MARC Cars Australia
2016	Formula 4 Australia	8th	Mygale–Ford F4-M14	AGI Sport
2017	Australian V8 Touring Car Series	**1st**	Holden Commodore VE	Brad Jones Racing
2017	Dunlop Super2 Series	21st	Holden Commodore VF	Brad Jones Racing
2017-18	New Zealand V8 Touring Cars	5th	Holden Commodore VE	Hamilton Motorsports
2018	Australian V8 Touring Car Series	4th	Holden Commodore VE	Brad Jones Racing
2018	Dunlop Super2 Series	10th	Holden Commodore VF	Brad Jones Racing
2018-19	New Zealand V8 Touring Cars	**1st**	Holden Commodore VE	Hamilton Motorsports
2019	Dunlop Super2 Series	10th	Holden Commodore VF	Brad Jones Racing
2019	Virgin Australia Supercars Championship	36th	Holden Commodore ZB	Brad Jones Racing; Matt Stone Racing
2020	Supercars Championship	22nd	Holden Commodore ZB	Brad Jones Racing
2021	Supercars Championship	21st	Holden Commodore ZB	Brad Jones Racing
2022	Supercars Championship	24th	Holden Commodore ZB	Brad Jones Racing
2023	Supercars Championship	25th	Chevrolet Camaro ZL1	Brad Jones Racing
2025	Australian National Trans-Am Series	25th	Ford Mustang	SCC Racing
2025	Supercars Championship	52nd	Chevrolet Camaro ZL1	Brad Jones Racing
2026	Australian National Trans-Am Series	8th	Chevrolet Camaro	Garry Rogers Motorsport

=== Complete Australian Formula 4 Championship results ===
(key) (Races in bold indicate pole position) (Races in italics indicate fastest lap)

Year	Team	1	2	3	4	5	6	7	8	9	10	11	12	13	14	15	16	17	18	DC	Points
2016	AGI Sport	SYM; 1 Ret	SYM; 2; 4	SYM; 3; 5	PHI; 1; 7	PHI; 2; 5	PHI; 3; 6	SMP; 1; 5	SMP; 2; 8	SMP; 3; 8	QLD; 1; 5	QLD; 2; 5	QLD; 3; 7	SAN; 1; 8	SAN; 2; 5	SAN; 3; 6	SUR; 1 Ret	SUR; 2 Ret	SUR; 3 DNS	8th	107

=== Super3 Series results ===
(key) (Round results only)

Super3 Series results
Year	Team	No.	Car	1	2	3	4	5	6	7	8	9	10	11	12	13	14	15	Position	Points
2017	Brad Jones Racing	21	Holden VE Commodore	PHI; R1; 5	PHI; R2; 3	PHI; R3; 3	**WIN**; **R4**; 1	WIN; R5; 2	WIN; R6; 1	**QLD**; **R7**; 1	QLD; R8; 1	QLD; R9; 1	**PHI**; **R10**; 2	PHI; R11; 3	PHI; R12; Ret	**SMP**; **R13**; 1	SMP; R14; 1	SMP; R15; 1	1st	594
2018	Brad Jones Racing	21	Holden VE Commodore	**PHI**; **R1**; 1	**PHI**; **R2**; 6	PHI; R3; 1	WIN; R4; 1	WIN; R5; 3	WIN; R6; 1	SMP; R7	SMP; R8	SMP; R9	QLD; R10	QLD; R11	QLD; R12	BEN; R13; 2	BEN; R14; 3	BEN; R15; 2	4th	373

=== Super2 Series results ===
(key) (Round results only)

Super2 Series results
Year	Team	No.	Car	1	2	3	4	5	6	7	8	9	10	11	12	13	14	15	16	17	18	19	20	21	Position	Points
2016	Paul Morris Motorsport	98	Ford FG Falcon	ADE; R1	ADE; R2	PHI; R3	PHI; R4	PHI; R5	BAR; R6	BAR; R7	BAR; R8	TOW; R9	TOW; R10	SAN; R11	SAN; R12	SAN; R13	BAT; R14; Ret	HOM; R15	HOM; R16						NC	0
2017	Brad Jones Racing	21	Holden VF Commodore	ADE; R1; 15	ADE; R2; Ret	ADE; R3; 16	SYM; R4; 15	SYM; R5; Ret	SYM; R6; DNS	SYM; R7; DNS	PHI; R8; 12	PHI; R9; 13	PHI; R10; 17	PHI; R11; 22	TOW; R12; 19	TOW; R13; 14	SMP; R14; 15	SMP; R15; 12	SMP; R16; 14	SMP; R17; 13	SAN; R18; 19	SAN; R19; 18	NEW; R20; Ret	NEW; R21; 12	21st	605
2018	Brad Jones Racing	21	Holden VF Commodore	ADE; R1; 14	ADE; R2; 16	ADE; R3; 15	SYM; R4; 3	SYM; R5; 9	SYM; R6; 12	BAR; R7; 16	BAR; R8; 10	BAR; R9; 12	TOW; R10; 15	TOW; R11; 16	SAN; R12; 7	SAN; R13; 13	BAT; R14; 11	NEW; R15; 11	NEW; R15; C						10th	933
2019	Brad Jones Racing	21	Holden VF Commodore	ADE; R1; 8	ADE; R2; 13	ADE; R3; 17	BAR; R4; 11	BAR; R5; 17	TOW; R6; 7	TOW; R7; 10	QLD; R8; 8	QLD; R9; 12	BAT; R10; 12	SAN; R11; 9	SAN; R12; 12	NEW; R13; 14	NEW; R14; 12								10th	1022

=== Supercars Championship results ===
(Races in bold indicate pole position) (Races in italics indicate fastest lap)

Supercars results
Year	Team	No.	Car	1	2	3	4	5	6	7	8	9	10	11	12	13	14	15	16	17	18	19	20	21	22	23	24	25	26	27	28	29	30	31	32	33	34	Position	Points
2019	Brad Jones Racing	4	Holden ZB Commodore	ADE; R1	ADE; R2	MEL; R3	MEL; R4	MEL; R5	MEL; R6	SYM; R7; 23	SYM; R8; 24	PHI; R9	PHI; R10	BAR; R11	BAR; R12	WIN; R13; 24	WIN; R14; 21	HID; R15; 20	HID; R16; 25	TOW; R17	TOW; R18	QLD; R19	QLD; R20	BEN; R21; 22	BEN; R22; 26													36th	461
2019	Matt Stone Racing	35	Holden ZB Commodore																					BEN; R21; PO	BEN; R22; PO	PUK; R23	PUK; R24	BAT; R25; Ret	SUR; R26; 20	SUR; R27; 20	SAN; QR; 24	SAN; R28; 20	NEW; R29	NEW; R30				36th	461
2020	Brad Jones Racing	4	Holden ZB Commodore	ADE; R1; 20	ADE; R2; 18	MEL; R3; C	MEL; R4; C	MEL; R5; C	MEL; R6; C	SMP1; R7; 23	SMP1; R8; 23	SMP1; R9; 18	SMP2; R10; 23	SMP2; R11; 10	SMP2; R12; 21	HID1; R13; 12	HID1; R14; 24	HID1; R15; 15	HID2; R16; 20	HID2; R17; 19	HID2; R18; 23	TOW1; R19; 16	TOW1; R20; 23	TOW1; R21; 22	TOW2; R22; 22	TOW2; R23; 22	TOW2; R24; 21	BEN1; R25; 23	BEN1; R26; 21	BEN1; R27; 22	BEN2; R28; 21	BEN2; R29; 17	BEN2; R30; 22	BAT; R31; Ret				22nd	812
2021	Brad Jones Racing	4	Holden ZB Commodore	BAT1; R1; 17	BAT1; R2; 21	SAN; R3; 18	SAN; R4; 21	SAN; R5; 23	SYM; R6; 15	SYM; R7; Ret	SYM; R8; 23	BEN; R9; 23	BEN; R10; 21	BEN; R11; 19	HID; R12; Ret	HID; R13; 22	HID; R14; 22	TOW1; R15; 17	TOW1; R16; 17	TOW2; R17; 17	TOW2; R18; 19	TOW2; R19; 21	SMP1; R20; 20	SMP1; R21; 19	SMP1; R22; 19	SMP2; R23; 19	SMP2; R24; 24	SMP2; R25; 17	SMP3; R26; 18	SMP3; R27; 21	SMP3; R28; 21	SMP4; R29; 16	SMP4; R30; C	BAT2; R31; 17				21st	1025
2022	Brad Jones Racing	4	Holden ZB Commodore	SMP; R1; 17	SMP; R2; 18	SYM; R3; 17	SYM; R4; 20	SYM; R5; 17	MEL; R6; 12	MEL; R7; 19	MEL; R8; 21	MEL; R9; 25	BAR; R10; 23	BAR; R11; 23	BAR; R12; 18	WIN; R13; 22	WIN; R14; 23	WIN; R15; 26	HID; R16; 24	HID; R17; 19	HID; R18; 17	TOW; R19; 24	TOW; R20; 20	BEN; R21; 26	BEN; R22; 21	BEN; R23; 19	SAN; R24; 20	SAN; R25; 22	SAN; R26; 15	PUK; R27; 14	PUK; R28; 17	PUK; R29; 20	BAT; R30; Ret	SUR; R31; 21	SUR; R32; 14	ADE; R33; 21	ADE; R34; 20	24th	1054
2023	Brad Jones Racing	4	Chevrolet Camaro ZL1	NEW; R1; 21	NEW; R2; 20	MEL; R3; 23	MEL; R4; 14	MEL; R5; 18	MEL; R6; 17	BAR; R7; 25	BAR; R8; 20	BAR; R9; 21	SYM; R10; 17	SYM; R11; 18	SYM; R12; 18	HID; R13; 24	HID; R14; Ret	HID; R15; 22	TOW; R16; 22	TOW; R17; 14	SMP; R18; 19	SMP; R19; 15	BEN; R20; Ret	BEN; R21; 21	BEN; R22; 14	SAN; R23; 18	BAT; R24; 21	SUR; R25; Ret	SUR; R26; 19	ADE; R27; 20	ADE; R28; 19							25th	1030
2025	Brad Jones Racing	12	Chevrolet Camaro ZL1	SYD; R1	SYD; R2	SYD; R3	MEL; R4	MEL; R5	MEL; R6	MEL; R7	TAU; R8	TAU; R9	TAU; R10	SYM; R11	SYM; R12	SYM; R13	BAR; R14	BAR; R15	BAR; R16	HID; R17	HID; R18	HID; R19	TOW; R20	TOW; R21	TOW; R22	QLD; R23	QLD; R24	QLD; R25	BEN; R26; 18	BAT; R27; Ret	SUR; R28	SUR; R29	SAN; R30	SAN; R31	ADE; R32	ADE; R33	ADE; R34	44th*	73*

=== Complete Bathurst 1000 results ===
Year	Team	Car	Co-driver	Position	Laps
2019	Matt Stone Racing	Holden Commodore ZB	(Australia) Todd Hazelwood	DNF	98
2020	Brad Jones Racing	Holden Commodore ZB	(Australia) Jack Perkins	DNF	149
2021	Brad Jones Racing	Holden Commodore ZB	(Australia) David Wall	17th	161
2022	Brad Jones Racing	Holden Commodore ZB	(New Zealand) Jaxon Evans	DNF	138
2023	Brad Jones Racing	Chevrolet Camaro Mk.6	(New Zealand) Jaxon Evans	21st	157
2025	Brad Jones Racing	Chevrolet Camaro Mk.6	(New Zealand) Jaxon Evans	DNF	129

=== Complete Bathurst 12 Hour results ===
Year	Team	Co-drivers	Car	Class	Laps	Overall position	Class position
2017	MARC Cars Australia	(Australia) Jake Camilleri (Australia) Rob Thomson	MARC Mazda 3 V8; 5.0 L Ford Coyote V8	I	267	21st	**3rd**
