= 2018–19 NZ Touring Cars Championship =

The 2018–19 NZ Touring Cars Championship (known for commercial reasons as the 2018–19 BNT V8s Championship) was the twentieth season of the series, and the fourth under the NZ Touring Cars name. The field consisted of two classes racing on the same grid. Class one featured both V8ST and NZV8 TLX cars. Class two consisted of older NZV8 TL cars. The series was won by Australian Jack Smith, with Justin Ashwell taking the Class Two championship.

== Race calendar ==
Rnd	Circuit	Date	Map
2018			2018–19 NZ Touring Cars Championship is located in New Zealand
1	Pukekohe Park Raceway (Pukekohe, Auckland Region)	2–4 November	2018–19 NZ Touring Cars Championship is located in New Zealand
2	Pukekohe Park Raceway (short layout) (Pukekohe, Auckland Region)	7–9 December	2018–19 NZ Touring Cars Championship is located in New Zealand
2019			2018–19 NZ Touring Cars Championship is located in New Zealand
3	Highlands Motorsport Park (Cromwell, Southland)	11–13 January	2018–19 NZ Touring Cars Championship is located in New Zealand
4	Teretonga Park (Invercargill, Southland Region)	18–20 January	2018–19 NZ Touring Cars Championship is located in New Zealand
5	Manfeild: Circuit Chris Amon (Feilding, Manawatū District)	8–10 February	2018–19 NZ Touring Cars Championship is located in New Zealand
6	Hampton Downs Motorsport Park (Hampton Downs, Waikato)	8–10 March	2018–19 NZ Touring Cars Championship is located in New Zealand

== Teams and drivers ==
Manufacturer	Vehicle	Entrant	No.	Driver	Rounds
Class One
Ford	Falcon (FG)	Lathrope Racing	73	(New Zealand) Brad Lathrope	All
Holden	Commodore (VE)	JumpFlex Racing	42	(New Zealand) Matt Tubbs	All
Holden	Commodore (VE)	Rob Wallace Racing	51	(New Zealand) Rob Wallace	All
Holden	Commodore (VE)	Hamilton Motorsports	84	(New Zealand) Lance Hughes	All
Holden	Commodore (VE)	Hamilton Motorsports	85	(Australia) Jack Smith	All
Nissan	Altima (L33)	Concept Motorsport	007	(New Zealand) Nick Ross	All
Toyota	Camary (XV50)	Richards Team Motorsport	10	(Australia) Brenton Grove	All
Toyota	Camary (XV50)	Richards Team Motorsport	62	(New Zealand) Chelsea Herbert	All
Toyota	Camary (XV50)	Richards Team Motorsport	222	(Australia) Scott Taylor	1–3, 5
Class Two
Ford	Falcon (BF)	Justin Ashwell Motorsport	11	(New Zealand) Justin Ashwell	All
Ford	Falcon (BF)	Brock Timperley Motorsport	59	(New Zealand) Brock Timperley	1
Ford	Falcon (BF)	Matt Podjursky Racing	77	(New Zealand) Matt Podjursky	All
Holden	Commodore (VZ)	Matthew Clarke Racing	80	(New Zealand) Matthew Clarke	1
Class Three
BMW	M3 (E92)	Mortimer Motorsport	15	(New Zealand) Kent Baigent	1
BMW	M3 (E92)	Mortimer Motorsport	98	(New Zealand) Andrew Nugent	5
BMW	M3 GTR (E46)	Mortimer Motorsport	177	(New Zealand) Matt Griffin	1
Ford	Falcon (BF)	Brayden Philips Racing	17	(New Zealand) Brayden Philips	3–4
Ford	Falcon (BF)	Darryl Clarke Racing	54	(New Zealand) Darryl Clarke	1
Ford	Falcon (BF)	Murray Bell Racing	110	(New Zealand) Murray Bell	5–6
Ford	Falcon (BF)	Nigel Karl Racing	171	(New Zealand) Nigel Karl	1
Ford	Mustang (S550)	Collins Motorsport	777	(New Zealand) Sam Collins	5
Ford	Mustang (S550)	Collins Motorsport	777	(New Zealand) Paul Radisich	6
Holden	Commodore (VE)	AV8 Motorsport	3	(New Zealand) Tony Anderson	2, 5–6
Holden	Commodore (VE)	AV8 Motorsport	32	(New Zealand) Tony Anderson	1
Holden	Commodore (VE)	Shaws Asphalters	23	(New Zealand) John de Veth	1
Holden	Commodore (VE)	McDonald Kerbing Specialist	50	(New Zealand) Blair McDonald	2, 6
Holden	Commodore (VE)	4H Investments- Auto Garage	57	(New Zealand) Eric Hennephof	2, 6
Holden	Commodore (VZ)	Justin McIllroy Racing	25	(New Zealand) Justin McIllroy	5
Hyundai	Hyundai i45	Motorsport Services	17	(New Zealand) Todd Murphy	1

== Race calendar and results ==
All rounds are to be held in New Zealand. The first round in Pukekohe Park Raceway will be held in support of the Supercars Championship. Rounds 3, 4 and 5 are to be held with the Toyota Racing Series.

Round		Circuit	Pole position	Fastest lap	Class One winner	Class Two winner	Class Three winner
2018
1	R1	Pukekohe Park Raceway; Pukekohe, Auckland Region	(Australia) Jack Smith	(Australia) Jack Smith	(Australia) Jack Smith	(New Zealand) Brock Timperley	(New Zealand) John de Veth
1	R2	Pukekohe Park Raceway; Pukekohe, Auckland Region		(New Zealand) Lance Hughes	(New Zealand) Nick Ross	(New Zealand) Brock Timperely	(New Zealand) Tony Anderson
1	R3	Pukekohe Park Raceway; Pukekohe, Auckland Region		(Australia) Jack Smith	(New Zealand) Nick Ross	(New Zealand) Brock Timperely	(New Zealand) John de Veth
2	R1	Pukekohe Park Raceway (short circuit); Pukekohe, Auckland Region	(Australia) Jack Smith	(Australia) Jack Smith	(Australia) Jack Smith	(New Zealand) Justin Ashwell	(New Zealand) Tony Anderson
2	R2	Pukekohe Park Raceway (short circuit); Pukekohe, Auckland Region		(Australia) Jack Smith	(Australia) Jack Smith	(New Zealand) Matt Podjursky	(New Zealand) Tony Anderson
2	R3	Pukekohe Park Raceway (short circuit); Pukekohe, Auckland Region		(Australia) Jack Smith	(New Zealand) Nick Ross	(New Zealand) Justin Ashwell	(New Zealand) Tony Anderson
2019
3	R1	Highlands Motorsport Park; Cromwell, Otago	(Australia) Jack Smith	(Australia) Jack Smith	(Australia) Jack Smith	(New Zealand) Matt Podjursky	(New Zealand) Brayden Philips
3	R2	Highlands Motorsport Park; Cromwell, Otago		(Australia) Jack Smith	(Australia) Jack Smith	(New Zealand) Matt Podjursky	(New Zealand) Brayden Philips
3	R3	Highlands Motorsport Park; Cromwell, Otago		(Australia) Jack Smith	(Australia) Jack Smith	(New Zealand) Justin Ashwell	(New Zealand) Brayden Philips
4	R1	Teretonga Park; Invercargill, Southland	(Australia) Jack Smith	(Australia) Jack Smith	(Australia) Jack Smith	(New Zealand) Matt Podjursky	(New Zealand) Brayden Philips
4	R2	Teretonga Park; Invercargill, Southland		(Australia) Jack Smith	(Australia) Jack Smith	(New Zealand) Matt Podjursky	(New Zealand) Brayden Philips
4	R3	Teretonga Park; Invercargill, Southland		(Australia) Jack Smith	(New Zealand) Nick Ross	(New Zealand) Matt Podjursky	(New Zealand) Brayden Philips
5	R1	Circuit Chris Amon; Feilding, Manawatū District	(Australia) Jack Smith	(Australia) Jack Smith	(New Zealand) Nick Ross	(New Zealand) Matt Podjursky	(New Zealand) Blair McDonald
5	R2	Circuit Chris Amon; Feilding, Manawatū District		(Australia) Jack Smith	(Australia) Jack Smith	(New Zealand) Matt Podjursky	(New Zealand) Tony Anderson
5	R3	Circuit Chris Amon; Feilding, Manawatū District		(Australia) Jack Smith	(Australia) Jack Smith	(New Zealand) Matt Podjursky	(New Zealand) Tony Anderson
6	R1	Hampton Downs Motorsport Park; Hampton Downs, North Waikato	(New Zealand) Lance Hughes	(New Zealand) Lance Hughes	(New Zealand) Lance Hughes	(New Zealand) Justin Ashwell	(New Zealand) Tony Anderson
6	R2	Hampton Downs Motorsport Park; Hampton Downs, North Waikato		(New Zealand) Lance Hughes	(New Zealand) Lance Hughes	(New Zealand) Matt Podjursky	(New Zealand) Paul Radisich
6	R3	Hampton Downs Motorsport Park; Hampton Downs, North Waikato		(New Zealand) Lance Hughes	(New Zealand) Lance Hughes	(New Zealand) Matt Podjursky	(New Zealand) Paul Radisich

== Championship standings ==
Pos	Driver	PUK1			PUK2			HIG			TER			CCA			HAM			Pts
Pos	Driver	R1	R2	R3	R1	R2	R3	R1	R2	R3	R1	R2	R3	R1	R2	R3	R1	R2	R3	Pts
Class One
1	(Australia) Jack Smith	**1**	2	2	**1**	1	2	**1**	1	1	**1**	1	Ret	2	1	1	9	5	2	1181
2	(New Zealand) Nick Ross	2	1	1	8	3	1	3	9	8	3	3	1	1	2	Ret	4	4	4	1084
3	(New Zealand) Lance Hughes	3	3	3	2	2	3	12	3	2	Ret	4	9	3	3	2	**1**	1	1	1023
4	(Australia) Brenton Grove	4	14	9	Ret	5	4	2	2	Ret	2	2	2	6	9	6	2	2	Ret	867
5	(New Zealand) Robert Wallace	8	8	6	5	9	7	6	6	5	5	7	5	4	6	3	6	13	Ret	833
6	(New Zealand) Chelsea Herbert	6	Ret	Ret	14	6	6	4	5	9	4	5	3	7	7	8	5	7	5	753
7	(New Zealand) Brad Lathrope	10	Ret	DNS	9	14	9	5	4	4	6	6	4	8	8	7	11	8	6	733
8	(New Zealand) Matt Tubbs	12	6	Ret	6	7	8	8	7	10	10	8	6				8	Ret	8	516
9	(Australia) Scott Taylor	11	10	Ret	7	10	10	7	11	3										309
Class Two
1	(New Zealand) Justin Ashwell	Ret	17	13	11	13	11	10	12	6	8	10	8	11	Ret	11	DSQ	11	9	1022
2	(New Zealand) Matt Podjursky	17	12	Ret	13	11	12	9	10	7	7	9	7	10	13	10	Ret	10	7	1018
3	(New Zealand) Brock Timperley	15	11	11																225
4	(New Zealand) Matthew Clark	18	18	Ret																114
Class Three
-	(New Zealand) Tony Anderson	7	4	5	3	4	5							Ret	4	4	3	DNS	DNS	
-	(New Zealand) Paul Radisich																10	3	3	
-	(New Zealand) John de Veth	5	5	4																
-	(New Zealand) Blair McDonald				4	8	13							5	Ret	DNS	7	6	Ret	
-	(New Zealand) Andrew Nugent													9	5	5				
-	(New Zealand) Matt Griffin	Ret	7	7																
-	(New Zealand) Brayden Philips							11	8	11	9	11	10							
-	(New Zealand) Todd Murphy	8	15	8																
-	(New Zealand) Kent Baigent	13	9	12																
-	(New Zealand) Sam Collins													DNS	10	9				
-	(New Zealand) Eric Hennephof				10	12	14										12	9	Ret	
-	(New Zealand) Darryl Clarke	14	13	10																
-	(New Zealand) Murray Bell													12	11	12	13	12	Ret	
-	(New Zealand) Justin McIllory													13	12	13				
-	(New Zealand) Nigel Karl	16	16	14	12	DNS	DNS													
Pos	Driver	R1	R2	R3	R1	R2	R3	R1	R2	R3	R1	R2	R3	R1	R2	R3	R1	R2	R3	Pts
Pos	Driver	PUK1			PUK2			HIG			TER			CCA			HAM			Pts

Colour	Result
Gold	Winner
Silver	Second place
Bronze	Third place
Green	Points classification
Blue	Non-points classification
Blue	Non-classified finish (NC)
Purple	Retired, not classified (Ret)
Red	Did not qualify (DNQ)
Red	Did not pre-qualify (DNPQ)
Black	Disqualified (DSQ)
White	Did not start (DNS)
White	Withdrew (WD)
White	Race cancelled (C)
Blank	Did not practice (DNP)
Blank	Did not arrive (DNA)
Blank	Excluded (EX)

**Bold** - Pole position
Italics - Fastest lap
