= 2017 Australian V8 Touring Car Series =

Motor racing competition

The 2017 Australian V8 Touring Car Series (commercially known as the 2017 Kumho Tyres Australian V8 Touring Car Series) was the tenth running of the Australian V8 Touring Car Series, the third tier of Australian touring car racing. The five-round, fifteen-race series began on 21 April at Phillip Island Grand Prix Circuit and concluded on 29 October at Sydney Motorsport Park.

== Entries ==
Team	Car	Class	No.	Driver	Rounds
Page Brothers Jayco	Holden Commodore VE	K	2	(Australia) Steven Page	1, 4
JCH Electrical	Ford Falcon BF	K	5	(Australia) Jason Heck	3
A.N.T. Racing	Ford Falcon BF	K	6	(Australia) Tony Evangelou	2
Poll Performance	Holden Commodore VE	K	7	(Australia) Jim Pollicina	All
Poll Performance	Holden Commodore VE	K	23	(Australia) Michael Caine	All
Prodrive Racing Australia	Ford Falcon BA	C	9	(Australia) Thomas Randle	3
Anderson Motorsport	Ford Falcon FG	K	11	(Australia) Michael Anderson	All
Century 21 Hazelbrook	Ford Falcon BF	K	12	(Australia) Chris Delfsma	1, 3, 5
Image Racing	Ford Falcon FG	C	14	(Australia) Josh Smith	1-3
Image Racing	Ford Falcon FG	C	49	(Australia) Jordan Boys	1-4
Image Racing	Ford Falcon BA	K	16	(Australia) Leigh Moran	1
Stapleton Motorsport	Ford Falcon EL	H	17	(Australia) Troy Stapleton	1-2
TF Maintenance	Ford Falcon BF	K	17	(Australia) Jason Foley	5
Brad Jones Racing	Holden Commodore VE	C	21	(Australia) Jack Smith	All
Glenn Seton Racing	Ford Falcon BF	C	30	(Australia) Aaron Seton	2-3
McDonald Motorsport	Holden Commodore VP	H	33	(Australia) Jamie McDonald	5
Nandi Kiss Racing	Holden Commodore VE	K	36	(Australia) Nandi Kiss	3, 5
Eggleston Motorsport	Holden Commodore VE	C	38	(Australia) Tyler Greenbury	All
Challenge Motorsport	Ford Falcon FG	K	39	(Australia) Chris Smerdon	All
Mac Motorsport	Ford Falcon BF	K	41	(Australia) Mark Primmer	1
Mac Motorsport	Ford Falcon BF	K	69	(Australia) Jon McCorkindale	All
Premium Shower Screens and Robes	Holden Commodore VY	K	46	(Australia) David Wright	2
Neill Motorsport	Holden Commodore VS	H	55	(Australia) Bradley Neill	All
Paul Morris Motorsport	Holden Commodore VE	K	66	(Australia) Jack Sipp	1
Paul Morris Motorsport	Ford Falcon FG	C	67	(Australia) Anton de Pasquale	3
Garry Hills Racing	Holden Commodore VE	K	76	(Australia) Garry Hills	1, 4
Protrack Automotive Performance	Holden Commodore VE	K	77	(Australia) Gary Collins	2, 4-5
WakeUp! Backpackers	Holden Commodore VZ	K	88	(Australia) Warren Millett	1-2, 5
Custom Garage	Ford Falcon EL	H	111	(Australia) Andy Cantrell	5
Emery Motorsport	Holden Commodore VE	C	888	(Australia) Geoff Emery	1

Icon	Class
C	Championship class
K	Kumho Cup
H	Heritage class

== Calendar and results ==
=== Overview ===
Round	Circuit	City / state	Date	Pole position	Winning driver	Winning team	Round winner
1	Phillip Island Grand Prix Circuit	Phillip Island, Victoria	April 22	(Australia) Michael Anderson	(Australia) Tyler Greenbury	Eggleston Motorsport	(Australia) Jordan Boys
1	Phillip Island Grand Prix Circuit	Phillip Island, Victoria	April 23		(Australia) Tyler Greenbury	Eggleston Motorsport	(Australia) Jordan Boys
1	Phillip Island Grand Prix Circuit	Phillip Island, Victoria	April 23		(Australia) Jordan Boys	Image Racing	(Australia) Jordan Boys
2	Winton Motor Raceway	Benalla, Victoria	May 20	(Australia) Jack Smith	(Australia) Jack Smith	Brad Jones Racing	(Australia) Jack Smith
2	Winton Motor Raceway	Benalla, Victoria	May 21		(Australia) Tyler Greenbury	Eggleston Motorsport	(Australia) Jack Smith
2	Winton Motor Raceway	Benalla, Victoria	May 21		(Australia) Jack Smith	Brad Jones Racing	(Australia) Jack Smith
3	Queensland Raceway	Willowbank, Queensland	July 29	(Australia) Jack Smith	(Australia) Jack Smith	Brad Jones Racing	(Australia) Jack Smith
3	Queensland Raceway	Willowbank, Queensland	July 30		(Australia) Jack Smith	Brad Jones Racing	(Australia) Jack Smith
3	Queensland Raceway	Willowbank, Queensland	July 30		(Australia) Jack Smith	Brad Jones Racing	(Australia) Jack Smith
4	Phillip Island Grand Prix Circuit	Phillip Island, Victoria	September 9	(Australia) Jack Smith	(Australia) Tyler Greenbury	Eggleston Motorsport	(Australia) Jon McCorkindale
4	Phillip Island Grand Prix Circuit	Phillip Island, Victoria	September 10		(Australia) Jon McCorkindale	Mac Motorsport	(Australia) Jon McCorkindale
4	Phillip Island Grand Prix Circuit	Phillip Island, Victoria	September 10		(Australia) Michael Anderson	Anderson Motorsport	(Australia) Jon McCorkindale
5	Sydney Motorsport Park	Eastern Creek, New South Wales	October 28	(Australia) Jack Smith	(Australia) Jack Smith	Brad Jones Racing	(Australia) Jack Smith
5	Sydney Motorsport Park	Eastern Creek, New South Wales	October 29		(Australia) Jack Smith	Brad Jones Racing	(Australia) Jack Smith
5	Sydney Motorsport Park	Eastern Creek, New South Wales	October 29		(Australia) Jack Smith	Brad Jones Racing	(Australia) Jack Smith

=== Series standings ===
Session	1	2	3	4	5	6	7	8	9	10	11	12	13	14	15	16	17	18	19
Qualifying	3																		
Races 1 & 2	40	35	31	27	23	20	17	15	13	10	9	8	7	6	5	4	3	2	1
Race 3	60	53	47	41	35	30	26	23	20	17	15	14	12	11	9	8	6	4	2

Pos.	Driver	Class	PHI			WIN			QLD			PHI			SMP			Pen.	Pts.
Pos.	Driver	Class	R1	R2	R3	R1	R2	R3	R1	R2	R3	R1	R2	R3	R1	R2	R3	Pen.	Pts.
1	(Australia) Jack Smith	C	5	3	3	1	2	1	1	1	1	2	3	Ret	1	1	1		594
2	(Australia) Tyler Greenbury	C	1	1	Ret	2	1	Ret	2	3	3	1	5	Ret	2	2	2		454
3	(Australia) Michael Anderson	K	3	5	9	5	3	3	8	8	5	3	10	1	4	3	4		444
4	(Australia) Jon McCorkindale	K	4	7	4	8	7	5	DNS	10	8	4	1	2	3	5	3		407
5	(Australia) Jim Pollicina	K	7	6	5	4	8	9	9	12	Ret	5	6	6	6	4	6		306
6	(Australia) Jordan Boys	C	8	4	1	3	5	2	4	4	9	Ret	8	Ret					298
=	(Australia) Michael Caine	K	9	8	6	7	Ret	6	10	9	10	6	2	4	7	9	7		298
8	(Australia) Chris Smerdon	K	10	12	12	9	6	10	11	13	11	7	4	3	5	8	5		280
9	(Australia) Josh Smith	C	6	2	14	6	4	4	7	6	6							13	208
10	(Australia) Anton de Pasquale	C							3	2	2								119
11	(Australia) Warren Millett	K	16	13	10	14	11	12							9	6	12		107
12	(Australia) Geoff Emery	C	2	9	2														101
13	(Australia) Gary Collins	K				12	10	11				9	9	Ret	10	10	11		98
14	(Australia) Bradley Neill	H	Ret	17	16	15	13	14	15	16	15	10	Ret	DNS	12	13	13		97
15	(Australia) Thomas Randle	C							5	5	4								87
16	(Australia) Nandi Kiss	K							13	14	13				11	7	8		77
17	(Australia) Steven Page	K	DNS	DNS	17							8	7	5					73
18	(Australia) Aaron Seton	C				Ret	DNS	DNS	6	7	7								63
19	(Australia) Chris Delfsma	K	13	14	11				14	15	14				Ret	DNS	DNS		53
20	(Australia) Troy Stapleton	H	15	15	13	13	12	13											52
21	(Australia) David Wright	K				11	9	8											46
22	(Australia) Garry Hills	K	12	10	7							Ret	DNS	DNS					45
23	(Australia) Tony Evangelou	K				10	14	7											44
24	(Australia) Jack Sipp	K	11	11	8														42
25	(Australia) Andy Cantrell	H													8	12	10		41
26	(Australia) Jason Heck	K							12	11	12								33
27	(Australia) Jason Foley	K													Ret	11	9		30
28	(Australia) Jamie McDonald	H													13	14	14		26
29	(Australia) Mark Primmer	K	14	16	15														20
30	(Australia) Leigh Moran	K	Ret	DNS	DNS														0
