= 2022 Winton SuperSprint =

Motor racing event

(Victoria (state)) 2022 Winton SuperSprint
Event Information
- Round 5 of 12 in the 2022 Supercars Championship
- Layout of the Winton Motor Raceway
- Date: 21–22 May 2022
- Location: Benalla, Victoria
- Venue: Winton Motor Raceway

Results
Race 1
Distance	36 laps	108.000 km
Pole position	(New Zealand) Shane van Gisbergen; Triple Eight Race Engineering	78.2643
Winner	(Australia) Cam Waters; Tickford Racing	49:10.3623
Race 2
Distance	36 laps	108.000 km
Pole position	(Australia) Cam Waters; Tickford Racing	78.5502
Winner	(New Zealand) Shane van Gisbergen; Triple Eight Race Engineering	49:18.2907
Race 3
Distance	36 laps	108.000 km
Pole position	(Australia) Cam Waters; Tickford Racing	78.3425
Winner	(Australia) Cam Waters; Tickford Racing	49:11.5491
Round Results
First	(Australia) Cam Waters; Tickford Racing	292 pts
Second	(New Zealand) Shane van Gisbergen; Triple Eight Race Engineering	289 pts
Third	(Australia) David Reynolds; Grove Racing	267 pts

The 2022 Winton SuperSprint (known for commercial purpose as the 2022 Pizza Hut Winton SuperSprint) was a motor racing event held as a part of the 2022 Supercars Championship from Saturday 21 May to Sunday 22 May 2022. The event was held at the Winton Motor Raceway in Benalla, Victoria. It was the fifth round of the 2022 Supercars Championship and consisted of three races of 108.000 kilometres each.

== Results ==
=== Race 1 ===
Pos	No.	Driver	Team	Laps	Time / Retired	Grid	Points
1	6	(Australia) Cam Waters	Tickford Racing	36	49:10.3623	2	100
2	97	(New Zealand) Shane van Gisbergen	Triple Eight Race Engineering	36	+0.400	1	92
3	26	(Australia) David Reynolds	Grove Racing	36	+3.0329	7	91
4	25	(Australia) Chaz Mostert	Walkinshaw Andretti United	36	+11.3465	3	80
5	10	(Australia) Lee Holdsworth	Grove Racing	36	+15.9295	5	74
6	20	(Australia) Scott Pye	Team 18	36	+18.0761	10	68
7	99	(Australia) Brodie Kostecki	Erebus Motorsport	36	+20.7115	11	64
8	11	(Australia) Anton De Pasquale	Dick Johnson Racing	36	+22.791	6	60
9	8	(Australia) Andre Heimgartner	Brad Jones Racing	36	+22.9246	9	56
10	88	(Australia) Broc Feeney	Triple Eight Race Engineering	36	+25.5335	8	52
11	17	(Australia) Will Davison	Dick Johnson Racing	36	+25.899	13	48
12	55	(Australia) Thomas Randle	Tickford Racing	36	+33.2009	14	46
13	5	(Australia) James Courtney	Tickford Racing	36	+34.1752	20	44
14	2	(Australia) Nick Percat	Walkinshaw Andretti United	36	+44.9299	22	42
15	96	(Australia) Macauley Jones	Brad Jones Racing	36	+45.1288	16	40
16	3	(Australia) Tim Slade	Blanchard Racing Team	36	+46.5288	24	38
17	27	(Australia) Jayden Ojeda	Walkinshaw Andretti United	36	+48.5796	19	36
18	34	(Australia) Jack Le Brocq	Matt Stone Racing	36	+49.3169	17	34
19	76	(Australia) Garry Jacobson	PremiAir Racing	36	+51.1023	27	32
20	14	(Australia) Bryce Fullwood	Brad Jones Racing	36	+51.4994	18	30
21	18	(Australia) Mark Winterbottom	Team 18	36	+52.3479	12	28
22	4	(Australia) Jack Smith	Brad Jones Racing	36	+55.9058	26	26
23	35	(Australia) Todd Hazelwood	Matt Stone Racing	36	+56.2521	21	24
24	56	(Australia) Jake Kostecki	Tickford Racing	36	+56.6538	15	22
25	49	(Australia) Jordan Boys	Image Racing	36	+57.2044	23	20
26	22	(New Zealand) Chris Pither	PremiAir Racing	36	+1:16.9362	25	18
27	9	(Australia) Will Brown	Erebus Motorsport	36	+1:29.877	4	16

=== Race 2 ===
Pos	No.	Driver	Team	Laps	Time / Retired	Grid	Points
1	97	(New Zealand) Shane van Gisbergen	Triple Eight Race Engineering	36	49:18.2907	2	100
2	6	(Australia) Cam Waters	Tickford Racing	36	+5.2987	1	92
3	26	(Australia) David Reynolds	Grove Racing	36	+8.5425	3	86
4	10	(Australia) Lee Holdsworth	Grove Racing	36	+15.0572	6	80
5	25	(Australia) Chaz Mostert	Walkinshaw Andretti United	36	+19.9167	4	74
6	9	(Australia) Will Brown	Erebus Motorsport	36	+21.8308	8	68
7	8	(New Zealand) Andre Heimgartner	Brad Jones Racing	36	+21.969	5	64
8	5	(Australia) James Courtney	Tickford Racing	36	+24.8262	15	65
9	18	(Australia) Mark Winterbottom	Team 18	36	+24.9473	10	56
10	11	(Australia) Anton De Pasquale	Dick Johnson Racing	36	+26.8026	7	52
11	99	(Australia) Brodie Kostecki	Erebus Motorsport	36	+27.3453	13	48
12	88	(Australia) Broc Feeney	Triple Eight Race Engineering	36	+29.0455	9	46
13	34	(Australia) Jack Le Brocq	Matt Stone Racing	36	+40.0369	11	44
14	17	(Australia) Will Davison	Dick Johnson Racing	36	+40.1802	12	42
15	3	(Australia) Tim Slade	Blanchard Racing Team	36	+40.4146	21	40
16	2	(Australia) Nick Percat	Walkinshaw Andretti United	36	+40.7396	16	38
17	35	(Australia) Todd Hazelwood	Matt Stone Racing	36	+41.950	17	36
18	55	(Australia) Thomas Randle	Tickford Racing	36	+42.7343	14	34
19	96	(Australia) Macauley Jones	Brad Jones Racing	36	+44.9574	18	32
20	56	(Australia) Jake Kostecki	Tickford Racing	36	+45.6034	27	30
21	14	(Australia) Bryce Fullwood	Brad Jones Racing	36	+47.2788	19	28
22	27	(Australia) Jayden Ojeda	Walkinshaw Andretti United	36	+52.5818	23	26
23	4	(Australia) Jack Smith	Brad Jones Racing	36	+57.0679	20	24
24	22	(New Zealand) Chris Pither	PremiAir Racing	36	+1:03.6582	25	22
25	49	(Australia) Jordan Boys	Image Racing	36	+1:08.6188	26	20
Ret	76	(Australia) Garry Jacobson	PremiAir Racing	26	overheating	22	0
Ret	20	(Australia) Scott Pye	Team 18	18	power steering	19	0

=== Race 3 ===
Pos	No.	Driver	Team	Laps	Time / Retired	Grid	Points
1	6	(Australia) Cam Waters	Tickford Racing	36	49:11.5491	1	100
2	97	(New Zealand) Shane van Gisbergen	Triple Eight Race Engineering	36	+0.4422	2	97
3	8	(New Zealand) Andre Heimgartner	Brad Jones Racing	36	+10.7326	3	86
4	26	(Australia) David Reynolds	Grove Racing	36	+15.2561	6	80
5	9	(Australia) Will Brown	Erebus Motorsport	36	+25.5654	5	74
6	10	(Australia) Lee Holdsworth	Grove Racing	36	+27.7565	9	68
7	88	(Australia) Broc Feeney	Triple Eight Race Engineering	36	+28.7059	11	64
8	11	(Australia) Anton De Pasquale	Dick Johnson Racing	36	+29.0243	4	60
9	18	(Australia) Mark Winterbottom	Team 18	36	+34.1904	8	56
10	17	(Australia) Will Davison	Dick Johnson Racing	36	+35.437	13	52
11	25	(Australia) Chaz Mostert	Walkinshaw Andretti United	36	+36.6163	10	48
12	55	(Australia) Thomas Randle	Tickford Racing	36	+39.0248	16	46
13	99	(Australia) Brodie Kostecki	Erebus Motorsport	36	+39.2761	7	44
14	20	(Australia) Scott Pye	Team 18	36	+41.8581	22	42
15	2	(Australia) Nick Percat	Walkinshaw Andretti United	36	+43.6102	27	40
16	76	(Australia) Garry Jacobson	PremiAir Racing	36	+45.4072	18	38
17	34	(Australia) Jack Le Brocq	Matt Stone Racing	36	+45.642	14	36
18	35	(Australia) Todd Hazelwood	Matt Stone Racing	36	+50.6382	20	34
19	96	(Australia) Macauley Jones	Brad Jones Racing	36	+53.8332	21	32
20	3	(Australia) Tim Slade	Blanchard Racing Team	36	+58.7913	17	30
21	27	(Australia) Jayden Ojeda	Walkinshaw Andretti United	36	+59.177	23	28
22	22	(New Zealand) Chris Pither	PremiAir Racing	36	+59.506	25	26
23	14	(Australia) Bryce Fullwood	Brad Jones Racing	36	+59.5245	24	24
24	49	(Australia) Jordan Boys	Image Racing	36	+1:02.3366	26	22
25	56	(Australia) Jake Kostecki	Tickford Racing	36	+1:02.6363	12	20
26	4	(Australia) Jack Smith	Brad Jones Racing	35	+1 lap	19	18
27	5	(Australia) James Courtney	Tickford Racing	31	+5 laps	15	16

== Championship standings after the race ==
Drivers' Championship standings

	Pos.	Driver	Points
Unchanged	1	(New Zealand) Shane van Gisbergen	1376
Unchanged	2	(Australia) Anton de Pasquale	1095
	3	(Australia) Cam Waters	1043
	4	(Australia) Will Davison	1018
	5	(Australia) David Reynolds	966

Teams' Championship standings

	Pos.	Constructor	Points
Unchanged	1	(Australia) Triple Eight Race Engineering	2263
Unchanged	2	(Australia) Dick Johnson Racing	2113
Unchanged	3	(Australia) Tickford Racing	1807
	4	(Australia) Grove Racing	1718
	5	(Australia) Walkinshaw Andretti United	1590

- Note: Only the top five positions are included for standings.
