= 2017–18 NZ Touring Cars Championship =

The 2017–18 NZ Touring Cars Championship (known for commercial reasons as the 2017–18 BNT V8s Championship) was the nineteenth season of the series, and the third under the NZ Touring Cars name. The field consisted of three classes racing on the same grid. Class one featured both V8ST and NZV8 TLX cars. Class two and three consisted of older NZV8 TL and varying touring cars.

The Class One championship was won by Andre Heimgartner while Class Two honours went to Liam MacDonald.

== Race calendar ==
Rnd	Circuit	Date	Map
2017			2017–18 NZ Touring Cars Championship is located in New Zealand
1	Pukekohe Park Raceway (Pukekohe, Auckland Region)	3–5 November	2017–18 NZ Touring Cars Championship is located in New Zealand
2	Bruce McLaren Motorsport Park (Taupō, Waikato)	1–3 December	2017–18 NZ Touring Cars Championship is located in New Zealand
2018			2017–18 NZ Touring Cars Championship is located in New Zealand
3	Mike Pero Motorsport Park (Christchurch, Canterbury Region)	12–14 January	2017–18 NZ Touring Cars Championship is located in New Zealand
4	Teretonga Park (Invercargill, Southland Region)	19–21 January	2017–18 NZ Touring Cars Championship is located in New Zealand
5	Manfeild: Circuit Chris Amon (Feilding, Manawatū District)	9–11 February	2017–18 NZ Touring Cars Championship is located in New Zealand
6	Hampton Downs Motorsport Park (Hampton Downs, Waikato)	9–11 March	2017–18 NZ Touring Cars Championship is located in New Zealand

== Teams and drivers ==
Manufacturer	Vehicle	Team	No.	Driver	Events
Class One
Holden	Commodore (VE)	JumpFlex Racing	42	(New Zealand) Matthew Tubbs	2–6
Holden	Commodore (VE)	Hamilton Motorsports	84	(New Zealand) Lance Hughes	All
Holden	Commodore (VE)	Hamilton Motorsports	85	(Australia) Jack Smith	1–3, 5–6
Nissan	Altima (L33)	Concept Motorsport	007	(New Zealand) Nick Ross	All
Toyota	Camary (XV50)	Richards Team Motorsport	71	(New Zealand) Andre Heimgartner	All
Toyota	Camary (XV50)	Richards Team Motorsport	97	(Australia) Jason Bargwanna	All
Toyota	Camary (XV50)	Richards Team Motorsport	222	(Australia) Scott Taylor	6
Ford	Falcon (FG)	Lathrope Racing	73	(New Zealand) Brad Lathrope	1–2, 5–6
Class Two
Ford	Falcon (BF)	Alan McCarrison Racing	9	(New Zealand) Alan McCarrison	1
Ford	Falcon (BF)	Digga	11	(New Zealand) Justin Ashwell	All
Ford	Falcon (BF)	Brock Timperley Motorsport	59	(New Zealand) Brock Timperley	All
Ford	Falcon (BF)	Chelsea Herbert Racing	62	(New Zealand) Chelsea Herbert	All
Ford	Falcon (BF)	Nick Farrier Racing	63	(New Zealand) Nick Farrier	1–2, 6
Ford	Falcon (BF)	Liam MacDonald Racing	69	(New Zealand) Liam MacDonald	All
Ford	Falcon (BF)	Grand Design Timber	77	(New Zealand) Rob Wallace	1–2, 5–6
Ford	Falcon (BF)	Dign4U	777	(New Zealand) Matt Podjursky	1–2, 5–6
Holden	Commodore (VZ)	Bronson Porter Racing	40	(New Zealand) Bronson Porter	1–2
Invitational
BMW	M3 (E46)	Mortimer Motorsport	177	(New Zealand) Matt Griffin	1
BMW	M3 (E92)	Mortimer Motorsport	197	(New Zealand) Warwick Mortimer	1
BMW	M3 (E92)	BM Racing	98	(New Zealand) Andrew Nugent	1
Ford	Falcon (BF)	Nigel Karl Racing	17; 171	(New Zealand) Nigel Karl	1–2, 5–6
Ford	Falcon (BF)	Thirsty Liquor	18; 117	(New Zealand) Shane Whitley	1; 2
Ford	Ford Falcon (BA)	AV8 Motorsport	32	(New Zealand) Tony Anderson	6
Ford	Ford Falcon (BA)	DFM Racing	80	(New Zealand) Jono Lester	6
Hyundai	Hyundai i45	Motorsport Services	17	(New Zealand) Todd Murphy	6
Holden	Commodore (VE)	Shaws Asphalters	23	(New Zealand) John de Veth	6
Holden	Commodore (VE)	AV8 Motorsport	3	(New Zealand) Tony Anderson	2
Holden	Commodore (VE)	McDonald Kerbing Specialists	50	(New Zealand) Blair McDonald	6
Holden	Commodore (VE)	4H Investments	57	(New Zealand) Eric Hennephof	6

== Calendar ==
Round 1 was held in support of the 2017 ITM Auckland SuperSprint while Round 5 was in support of the 2018 New Zealand Grand Prix.

Rnd		Circuit	Pole position	Fastest lap	Class 1 Winner	Class 2 Winner	Invitational Winner
2017
1	R1	Pukekohe Park Raceway	(New Zealand) Andre Heimgartner	(Australia) Jason Bargwanna	(Australia) Jason Bargwanna	(New Zealand) Liam MacDonald	(New Zealand) Andrew Nugent
1	R2	Pukekohe Park Raceway		(New Zealand) Nick Ross	(Australia) Jason Bargwanna	(New Zealand) Liam MacDonald	(New Zealand) Matt Griffin
1	R3	Pukekohe Park Raceway		(New Zealand) Andre Heimgartner	(New Zealand) Andre Heimgartner	(New Zealand) Liam MacDonald	(New Zealand) Andrew Nugent
2	R1	Bruce McLaren Motorsport Park	(New Zealand) Andre Heimgartner	(New Zealand) Andre Heimgartner	(New Zealand) Andre Heimgartner	(New Zealand) Chelsea Herbert	(New Zealand) Nigel Karl
2	R2	Bruce McLaren Motorsport Park		(Australia) Jason Bargwanna	(Australia) Jason Bargwanna	(New Zealand) Liam MacDonald	(New Zealand) Nigel Karl
2	R3	Bruce McLaren Motorsport Park		(New Zealand) Andre Heimgartner	(New Zealand) Andre Heimgartner	(New Zealand) Brock Timperley	no starters
2018
3	R1	Mike Pero Motorsport Park	(New Zealand) Andre Heimgartner	(New Zealand) Andre Heimgartner	(New Zealand) Andre Heimgartner	(New Zealand) Chelsea Herbert	no entrants
3	R2	Mike Pero Motorsport Park		(Australia) Jason Bargwanna	(New Zealand) Andre Heimgartner	(New Zealand) Liam MacDonald	no entrants
3	R3	Mike Pero Motorsport Park		(New Zealand) Nick Ross	(New Zealand) Andre Heimgartner	(New Zealand) Justin Ashwell	no entrants
4	R1	Teretonga Park	(New Zealand) Andre Heimgartner	(New Zealand) Andre Heimgartner	(New Zealand) Andre Heimgartner	(New Zealand) Brock Timperley	no entrants
4	R2	Teretonga Park		(Australia) Jason Bargwanna	(Australia) Jason Bargwanna	(New Zealand) Liam MacDonald	no entrants
4	R3	Teretonga Park		(Australia) Jason Bargwanna	(New Zealand) Nick Ross	(New Zealand) Brock Timperley	no entrants
5	R1	Manfeild: Circuit Chris Amon	(New Zealand) Nick Ross	(New Zealand) Andre Heimgartner	(New Zealand) Andre Heimgartner	(New Zealand) Brock Timperley	no starters
5	R2	Manfeild: Circuit Chris Amon		(Australia) Jack Smith	(New Zealand) Nick Ross	(New Zealand) Brock Timperley	no starters
5	R3	Manfeild: Circuit Chris Amon		(Australia) Jack Smith	(Australia) Jason Bargwanna	(New Zealand) Brock Timperley	no starters
6	R1	Hampton Downs Motorsport Park	(Australia) Jason Bargwanna	(Australia) Jason Bargwanna	(Australia) Jason Bargwanna	(New Zealand) Brock Timperley	(New Zealand) John de Veth
6	R2	Hampton Downs Motorsport Park		(Australia) Jack Smith	(New Zealand) Nick Ross	(New Zealand) Liam MacDonald	(New Zealand) John de Veth
6	R3	Hampton Downs Motorsport Park		(Australia) Jack Smith	(Australia) Jack Smith	(New Zealand) Brock Timperley	(New Zealand) Nigel Karl

== Championship standings ==
Pos	Driver	PUK			TAU			RUA			TER			MAN			HAM			Pen.	Pts
Pos	Driver	R1	R2	R3	R1	R2	R3	R1	R2	R3	R1	R2	R3	R1	R2	R3	R1	R2	R3	Pen.	Pts
Class One
1	(New Zealand) Andre Heimgartner	**18**	2	1	**1**	4	1	**1**	1	1	**1**	2	2	**1**	3	10	2	4	4		1179
2	(Australia) Jason Bargwanna	1	1	4	2	1	2	2	Ret	2	2	1	3	12	5	1	**1**	10	3		1106
3	(New Zealand) Nick Ross	3	17	2	4	2	3	3	2	3	Ret	3	1	2	1	3	17	1	2		1065
4	(New Zealand) Lance Hughes	2	4	Ret	5	5	4	4	9	4	3	4	9	4	4	2	3	18	15		873
5	(Australia) Jack Smith	8	5	12	3	3	5	9	3	Ret				3	2	4	5	2	1		817
6	(New Zealand) Matthew Tubbs				7	7	10	10	4	7	7	5	6	10	13	11	9	5	6		704
7	(New Zealand) Brad Lathrope	Ret	6	Ret	6	6	6							5	6	13	8	6	5		463
8	(Australia) Scott Taylor																7	8	7		136
Class Two
1	(New Zealand) Liam MacDonald	6	8	3	13	8	8	6	5	Ret	DSQ	6	5	7	9	6	15	11	9		1090
2	(New Zealand) Brock Timperley	12	16	6	Ret	10	7	8	7	Ret	4	7	4	6	7	5	11	12	8		1055
3	(New Zealand) Chelsea Herbert	9	9	7	8	Ret	11	5	6	6	5	8	7	8	8	8	13	15	14		1041
4	(New Zealand) Justin Ashwell	11	15	14	12	13	13	7	8	5	6	9	8	9	11	9	16	14	11		948
5	(New Zealand) Matt Podjurksy	10	Ret	Ret	9	14	14							11	10	7	12	13	10		555
6	(New Zealand) Robert Wallace	7	11	5	Ret	11	Ret							DNS	12	12	14	16	18		431
7	(New Zealand) Nick Farrier	13	10	8	14	9	9										20	17	13		418
8	(New Zealand) Bronson Porter	Ret	12	13	Ret	12	12														192
9	(New Zealand) Alan McCarrison	15	Ret	Ret																	39
Invitational
-	(New Zealand) John DeVeth																4	3	16		-
-	(New Zealand) Matt Griffin	5	3	Ret																	-
-	(New Zealand) Andrew Nugent	4	Ret	9																	-
-	(New Zealand) Blair McDonald																6	7	19		-
-	(New Zealand) Warwick Mortimer	17	7	10																	-
-	(New Zealand) Jono Lester																10	9	17		-
-	(New Zealand) Nigel Karl	14	13	11	10	15	DNS							DNS	DNS	DNS	19	DNS	12		-
-	(New Zealand) Shane Whitley	16	14	15	11	Ret	DNS														-
-	(New Zealand) Eric Hennephof																18	DNS	DNS		-
-	(New Zealand) Tony Anderson				DNS	DNS	DNS														-
Pos	Driver	R1	R2	R3	R1	R2	R3	R1	R2	R3	R1	R2	R3	R1	R2	R3	R1	R2	R3	Pen.	Pts
Pos	Driver	PUK			TAU			RUA			TER			MAN			HAM			Pen.	Pts

Colour	Result
Gold	Winner
Silver	Second place
Bronze	Third place
Green	Points classification
Blue	Non-points classification
Blue	Non-classified finish (NC)
Purple	Retired, not classified (Ret)
Red	Did not qualify (DNQ)
Red	Did not pre-qualify (DNPQ)
Black	Disqualified (DSQ)
White	Did not start (DNS)
White	Withdrew (WD)
White	Race cancelled (C)
Blank	Did not practice (DNP)
Blank	Did not arrive (DNA)
Blank	Excluded (EX)

**Bold** - Pole position
Italics - Fastest lap
