= Holden Commodore (ZB) =

Australian full-size car

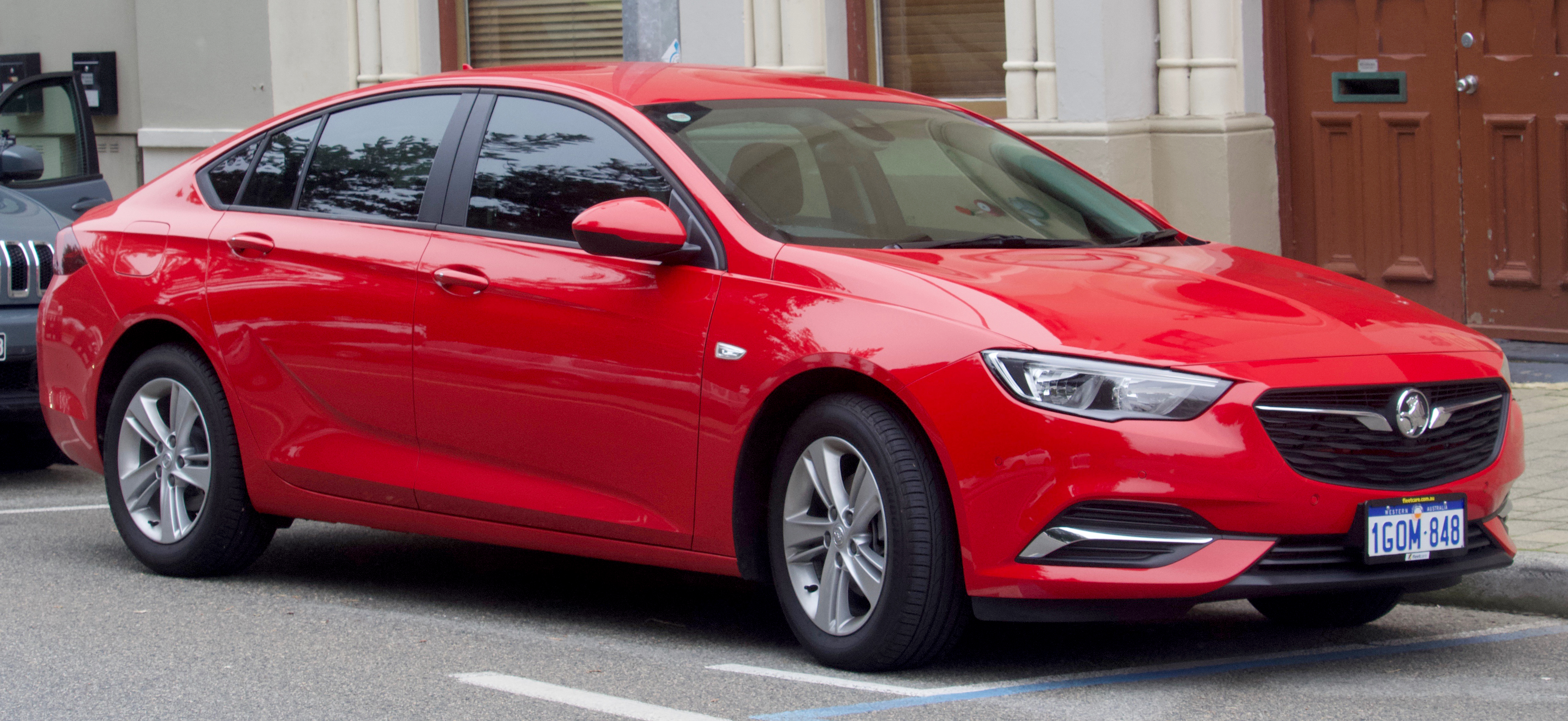
- 2018 Holden Commodore (ZB) LT sedan

Overview
- Manufacturer: Opel (General Motors)
- Also called: Opel Insignia; Buick Regal; Vauxhall Insignia
- Production: February 2018 – December 2020
- Assembly: Germany: Rüsselsheim (Opel Automobile GmbH)

Body and chassis
- Class: Full-size car
- Body style: 5-door liftback/fastback 5-door station wagon
- Layout: FF/F4/FR (motorsport)
- Platform: E2XX platform

Powertrain
- Engine: 2.0 L LTG turbo petrol I4; 3.6 L LGX petrol V6; 2.0 L Fiat Multijet II turbo-diesel I4
- Transmission: 8-speed Aisin AF50-8 automatic (diesel); 9-speed GM 9T50 automatic (2.0T); 9-speed GM 9T60 automatic (V6)

Dimensions
- Wheelbase: 2,829 mm (111.4 in)
- Length: 4,897 mm (192.8 in); 4,986 mm (196.3 in) (wagon)
- Width: 1,864 mm (73.4 in)
- Height: 1,455 mm (57.3 in)
- Kerb weight: 1,440–1,649 kg (3,175–3,635 lb)

Chronology
- Predecessor: Holden Commodore (VF); Holden Malibu; Holden Insignia; Holden Adventra (AWD Tourer); Holden Caprice (Calais-V)

The Holden Commodore (ZB) is a full-size car that was manufactured from 2018 to 2020 by Opel for Holden, then subsidiary companies of General Motors. It is the fifth and final generation of the Holden Commodore range. It is a re-engineered version of the Opel Insignia, and was co-developed by Opel and Holden between 2012 and 2017.

== Overview ==
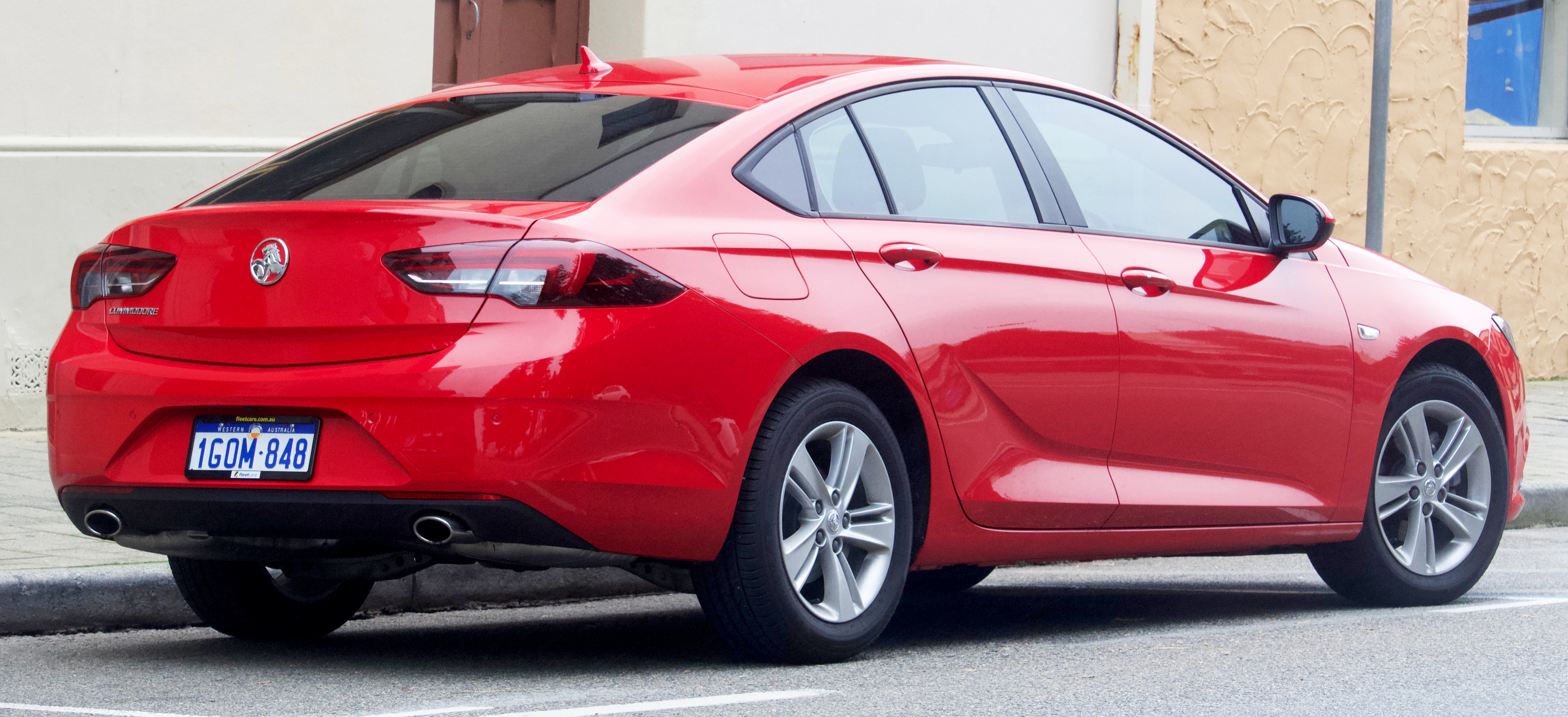
Sedan

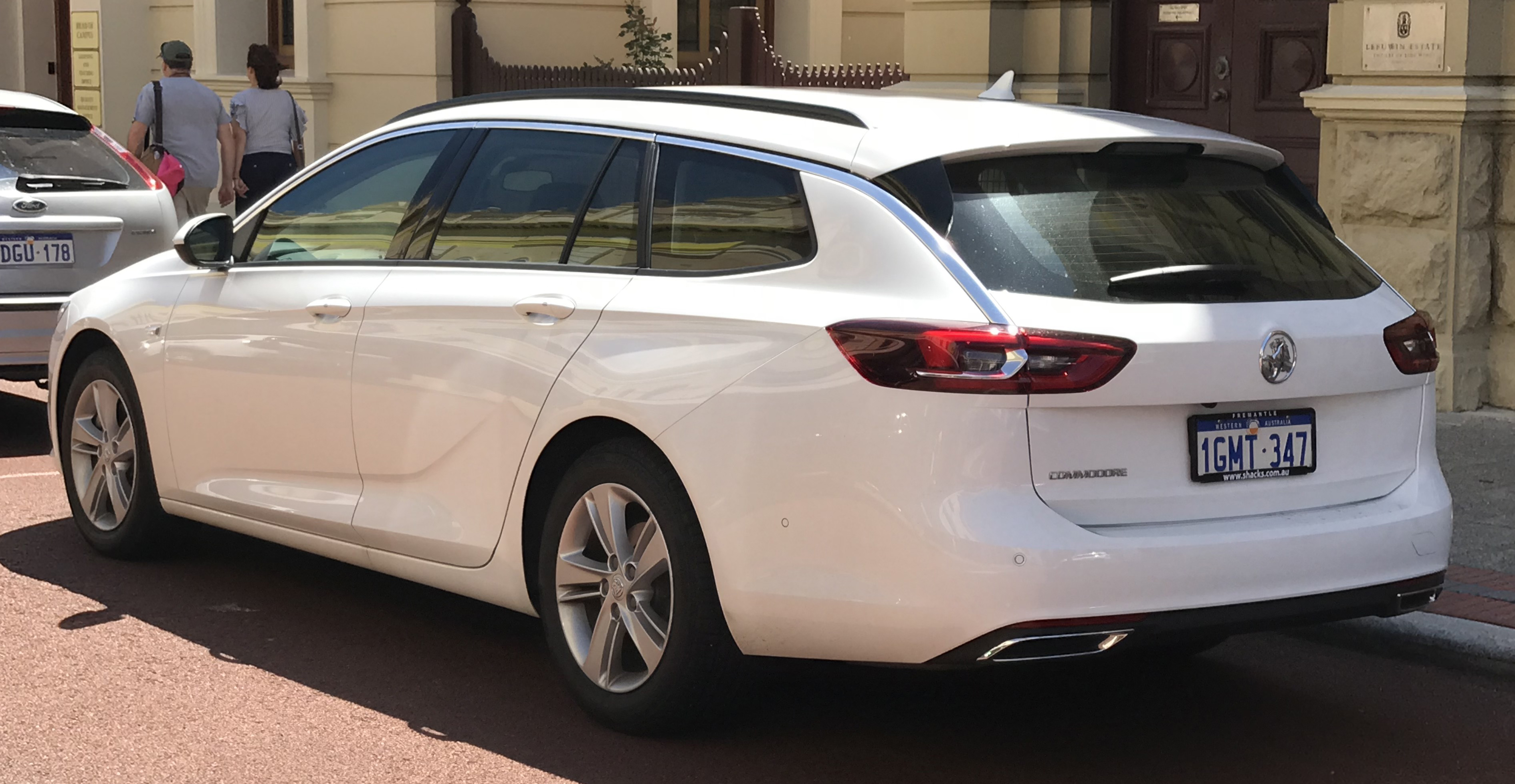
Wagon

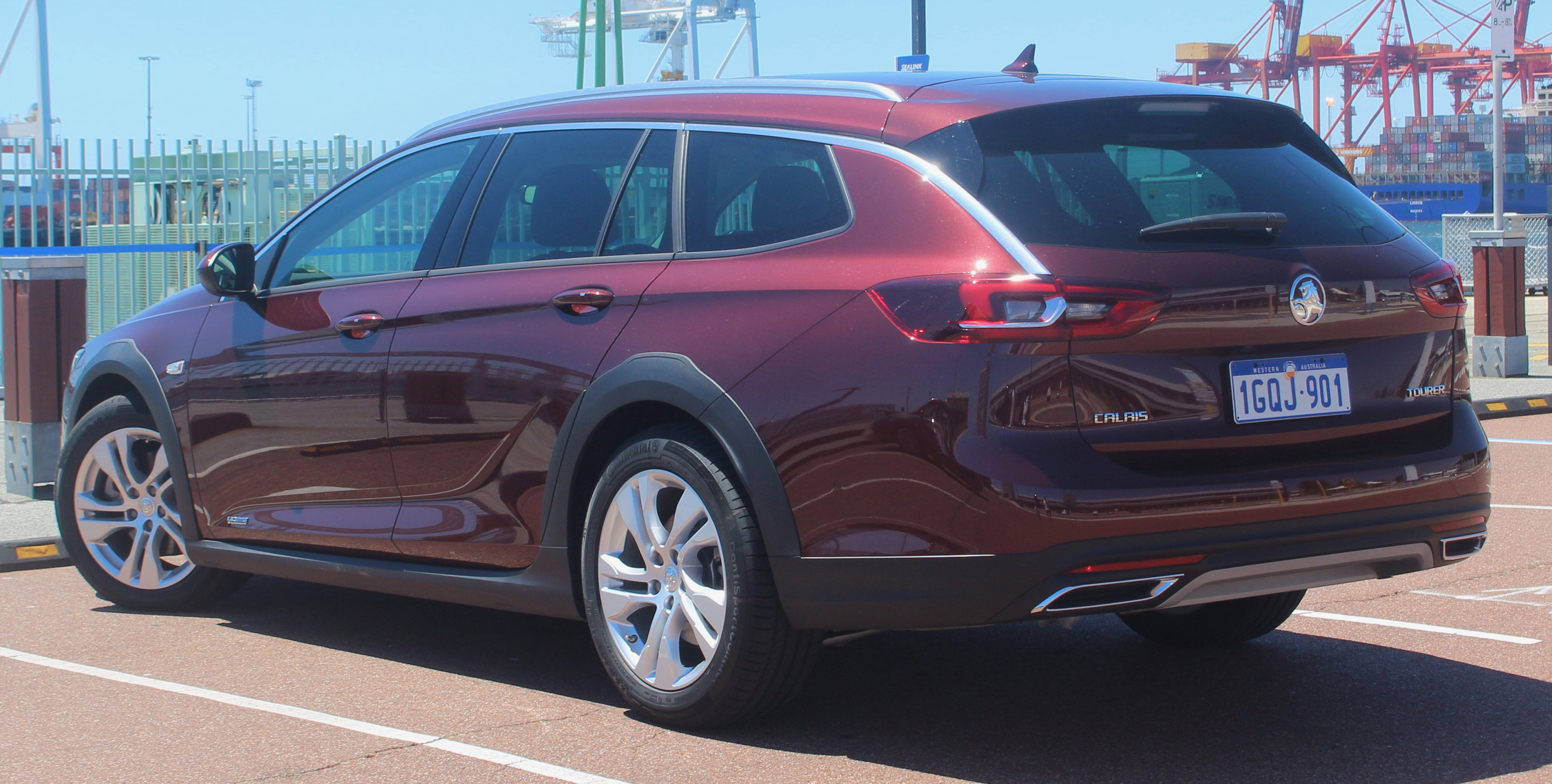
Tourer

The ZB Commodore was Holden's first and only imported model to be sold under the Commodore nameplate. The range included the five-door liftback and five-door station wagon bodystyles.

Holden previously sold the first generation Insignia under the Opel marque (Opel Insignia) in 2012 and 2013, as well as under the Holden marque (Holden Insignia) from 2015 to 2017. It was the first Holden Commodore model to be manufactured outside of Australia, following the closure of Holden's Australian car manufacturing facilities at Elizabeth and Fishermans Bend on Friday, 20 October 2017.

It was the first Commodore in thirty years to come with a four-cylinder engine as standard, and controversially, the first in its forty year production not to have a V8 powertrain option. GM made the decision to discontinue Australian manufacturing of the Holden Commodore due to falling sales and losses.

Despite good reviews, the ZB Commodore proved to be unpopular in Australia resulting in cuts to the production schedule and the lowest unit sales per month on record since the original VB Commodore was released in 1978. November 2019 was the worst month recorded with only 309 Commodores sold.

The ZB Commodore, and the Commodore nameplate, were discontinued at the end of 2020 due to low sales. Two months later, Holden as a company, marque, and nameplate was retired altogether by 2021.

== Development ==
Development for the ZB Commodore started in 2012, with both Holden and Opel working alongside each other, designing and developing the next generation Insignia, with Holden catering it to Australian conditions.

The ZB Commodore is different from the Z18 Insignia that it is based on in its more direct and responsive Australian-specific steering, suspension and exhaust tuning, its driving dynamics and how the car feels to drive. The 3.6-litre LGX V6 engine was also not available in either the Opel or Vauxhall Insignia. The chassis was re-worked and the VXR variant's sound symposer was also completely changed by Bose engineers.

Once the car was ready, prototypes were sent to Australia for testing. Holden completed over 100,000 km of testing from 2012 to 2017, with engineers bracing the cars to withstand local roads and make it feel similar to previous Commodore generations.

== Safety ==
Akin to its VF Commodore predecessor, the ZB achieved five stars in the ANCAP safety ratings. Originally, the ZB ANCAP rating was awarded based on the Euro NCAP test of a 1.6 litre model which was not sold in Australia. ANCAP conducted an audit test on specification of Australia V6 and confirmed its rating.

ANCAP test results* Holden Commodore (2018, aligned with Euro NCAP)
Test	Points	%
Overall:	5 /5 stars	
Adult occupant:	35.34	93%
Child occupant:	41.96	85%
Pedestrian:	32.83	78%
Safety assist:	9.35	77%

== Powertrains ==
The ZB Commodore was available with a range of engines including a four-cylinder petrol, four-cylinder diesel and six-cylinder petrol engine. Front-wheel drive and all-wheel drive was available across the liftback and wagon body styles.

Model	Bodystyle	Engine	Displacement	Power	Torque	Transmission	LT	RS	RS-V	VXR	Calais	Calais-V
Petrol	Liftback	I4	2.0 L (1,998 cc)	191 kW (256 hp; 260 PS) at 5,500 rpm	350 N⋅m (258 lb⋅ft) at 3,000–4,000 rpm	9-speed automatic	●	●	–	–	●	–
Petrol	Wagon	I4	2.0 L (1,998 cc)	191 kW (256 hp; 260 PS) at 5,500 rpm	350 N⋅m (258 lb⋅ft) at 3,000–4,000 rpm	9-speed automatic	●	●	–	–	–	–
Petrol	Liftback	V6	3.6 L (3,564 cc)	235 kW (315 hp; 320 PS) at 6,800 rpm	381 N⋅m (281 lb⋅ft) at 5,200 rpm	9-speed automatic	–	●	●	●	–	●
Petrol	Wagon	V6	3.6 L (3,564 cc)	235 kW (315 hp; 320 PS) at 6,800 rpm	381 N⋅m (281 lb⋅ft) at 5,200 rpm	9-speed automatic	–	–	●	–	●	●
Diesel	Liftback	I4	2.0 L (1,956 cc)	125 kW (168 hp; 170 PS) at 3,750 rpm	400 N⋅m (295 lb⋅ft) at 1,750–2,500 rpm	8-speed automatic	●	–	–	–	●	–
Diesel	Wagon	I4	2.0 L (1,956 cc)	125 kW (168 hp; 170 PS) at 3,750 rpm	400 N⋅m (295 lb⋅ft) at 1,750–2,500 rpm	8-speed automatic	●	–	–	–	–	–

== Models ==
Compared to the VF Commodore, Holden rearranged the specification levels and model nameplates, with only the Calais (and Calais-V) surviving into the ZB series, this name having originated in the VK-series Commodore of 1984 as a luxury model. Like previous Commodores, the ZB Commodore's trim levels are split into two categories: Luxury (LT, Calais and Calais-V) and Sport (RS, RS-V and VXR.) The two model lines can be most easily distinguished by their unique front bumpers and side skirts, as well as unique rear bumpers with larger exhaust tips in the case of the RS-V and VXR.

All models with either the 2.0L turbo petrol or diesel engine were exclusively front wheel drive, and all models with the 3.6L petrol V6 were exclusively all wheel drive, with the same GKN Twinster torque-vectoring all wheel drive system used in the Ford Focus RS.

=== Commodore LT ===
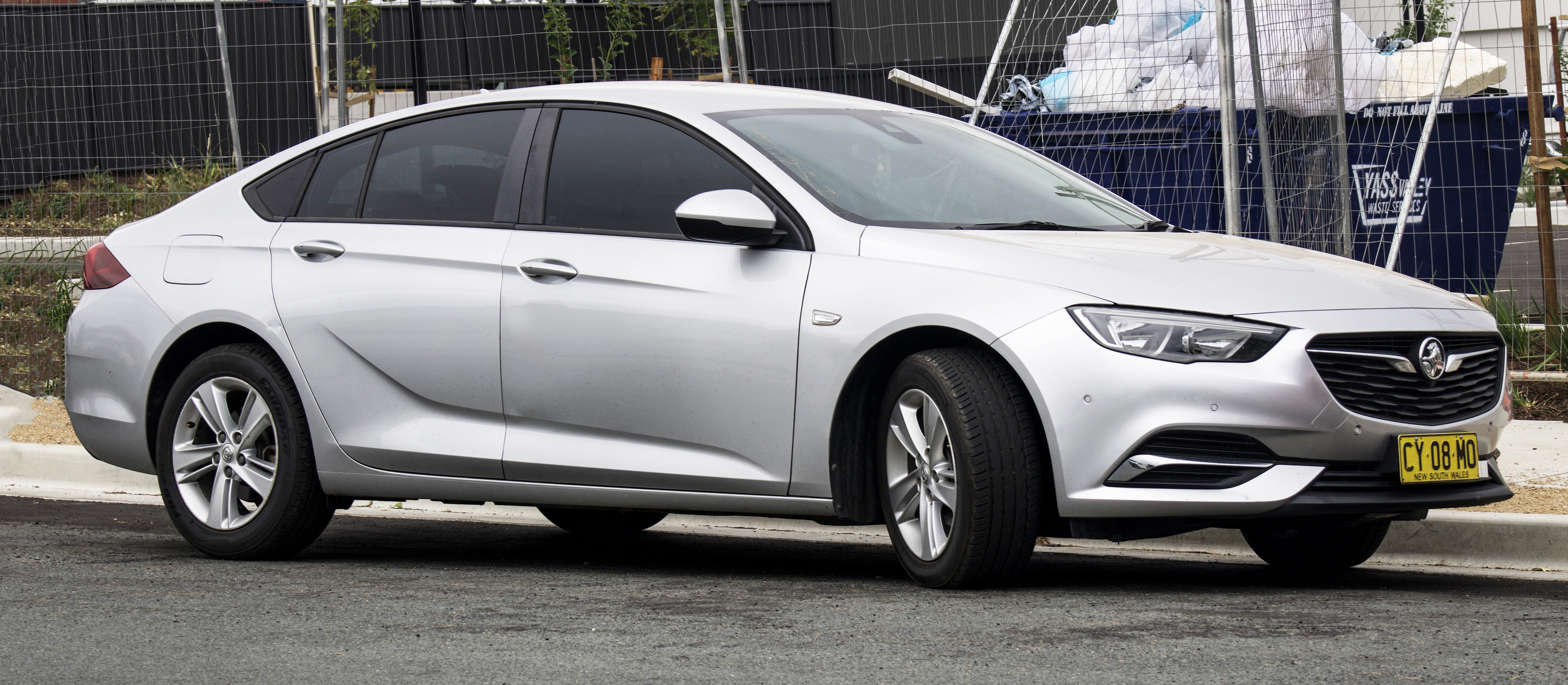
Holden Commodore LT

The LT was the entry-level variant, replacing the Evoke. It was available with the 2.0-litre inline-four petrol or diesel engines. It was front-wheel drive. It featured 17-inch alloy wheels, Autonomous Emergency Braking (AEB), Lane Keep Assist, a 7-inch MyLink system with Apple CarPlay and Android Auto, passive entry and push-button start. It was available as a liftback and wagon (Tourer).

=== Commodore RS ===
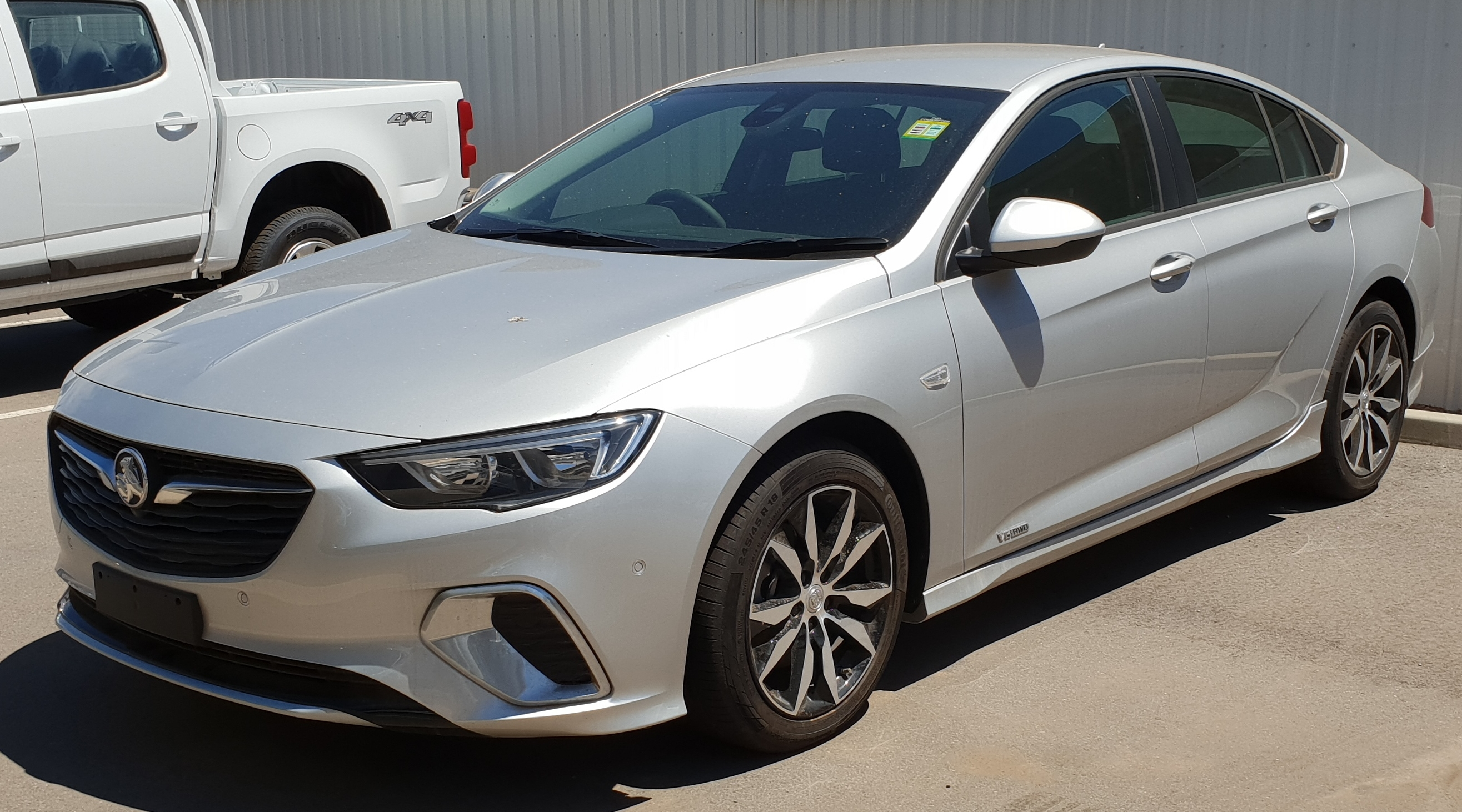
Holden Commodore RS

The RS was the entry-level sports variant. It featured Blind Zone Alert and Rear Cross Traffic Alert, 18-inch alloy wheels, and an upgraded interior with different seats and steering wheel. The 3.6-litre V6, coupled with all-wheel drive, was an available option, exclusive to the liftback.

=== Commodore RS–V ===
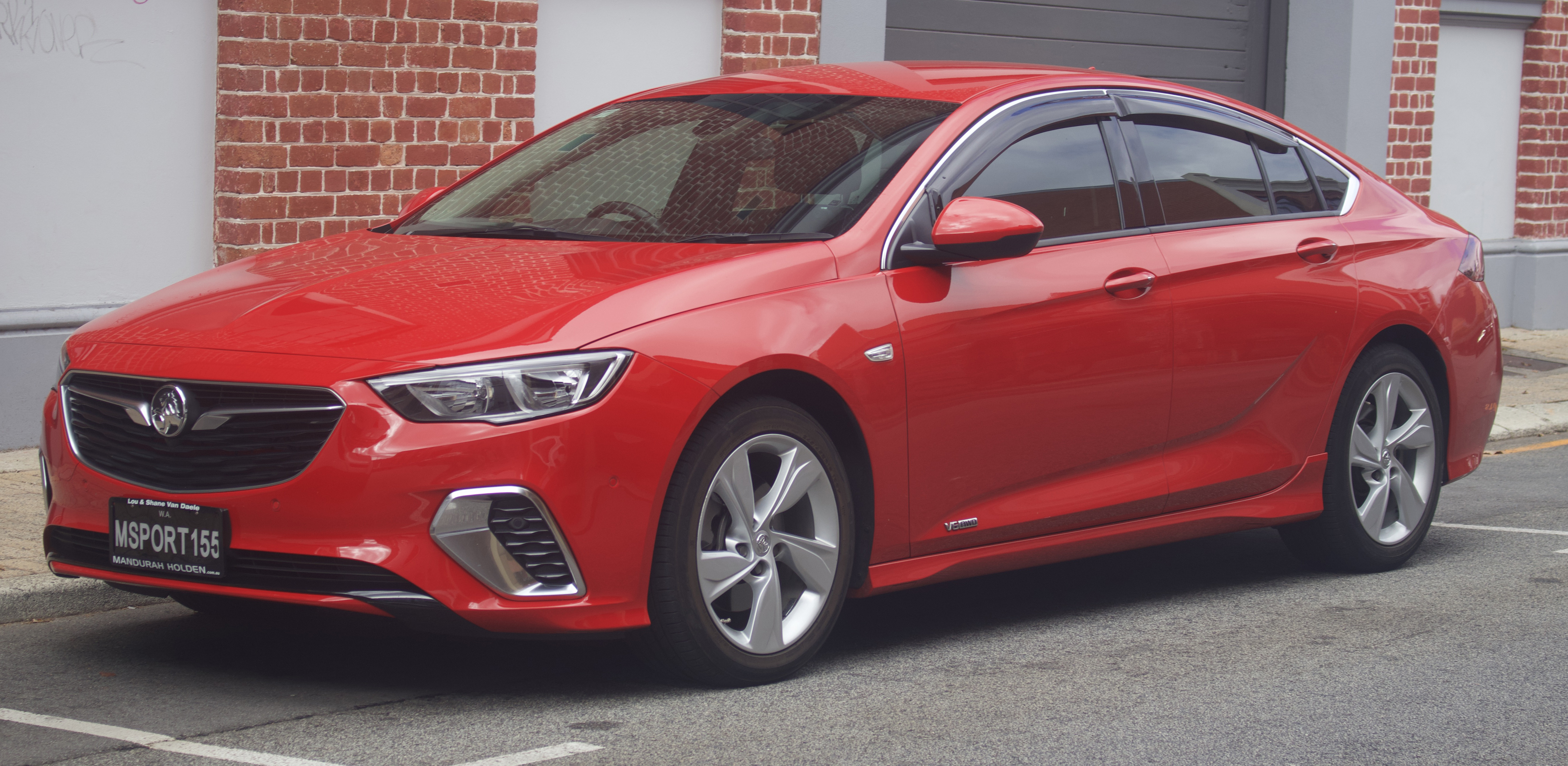
RS-V

The RS–V was the mid-range performance model, and while it was similar to the RS, it included more features such as an upgraded 8-inch MyLink system incorporating satellite navigation, wireless phone charging, Hi Per Strut Suspension, a limited-slip differential, leather seats, different alloy wheels, larger exhaust tips and the Twinster AWD system. Only the V6 AWD powertrain was offered, in liftback and wagon forms.

=== Commodore VXR ===
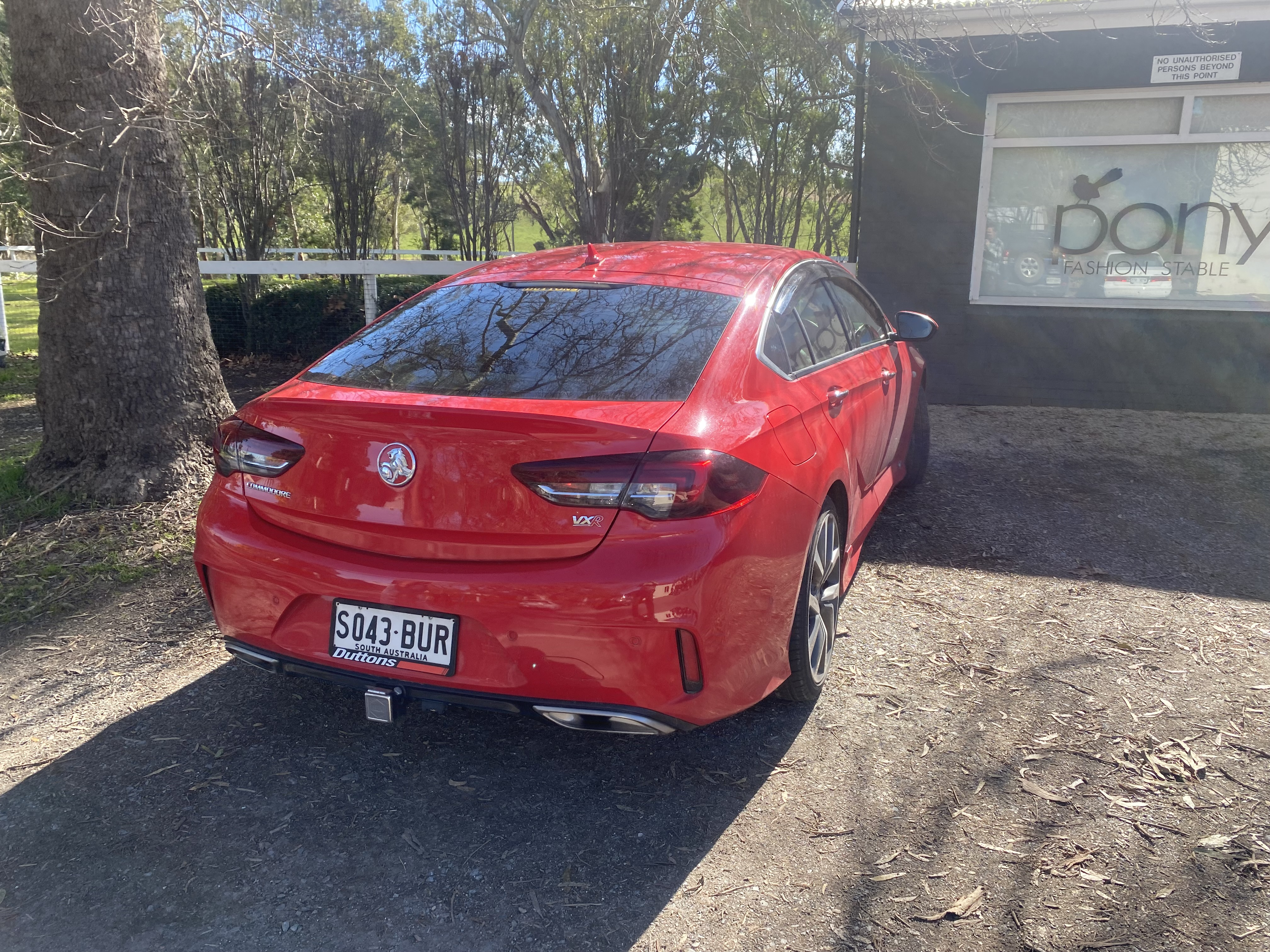
VXR

The VXR was the flagship sports variant. It featured IntelliLux Matrix LED headlights, front Brembo brakes, VXR and Competitive drive modes, large rear spoiler, cooled front seats, heated rear seats, 360-degree camera, Bose audio system, and 20-inch alloy wheels with Michelin Pilot Super Sport tyres. It was the only model available with FlexRide adaptive suspension, alloy pedals and black headliner. It was only available with the V6 and AWD. It was offered as both a liftback and a wagon.

=== Calais ===
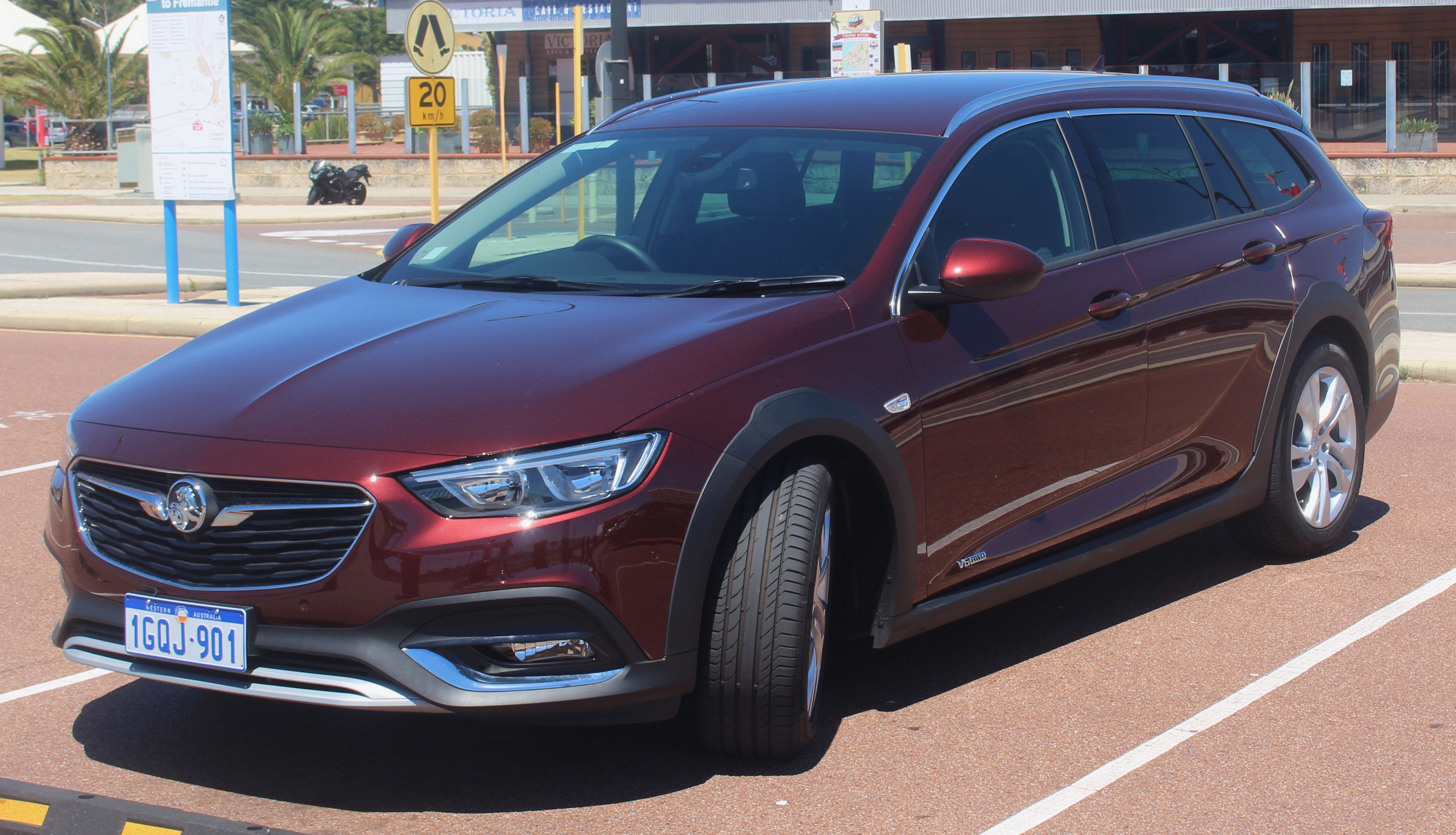
Holden Calais Tourer

The Calais was the base luxury model, retaining the nameplate used on top-end luxury Commodores since 1984. It featured 18-inch alloy wheels, leather heated front seats, wireless phone charging, Blind Spot Alert, Rear Cross Traffic Alert and an 8-inch MyLink system. It was available as a liftback or Tourer (wagon). The liftback was available with 2.0-litre petrol or diesel engines, with the Tourer only available with the 3.6-litre V6.

=== Calais-V ===
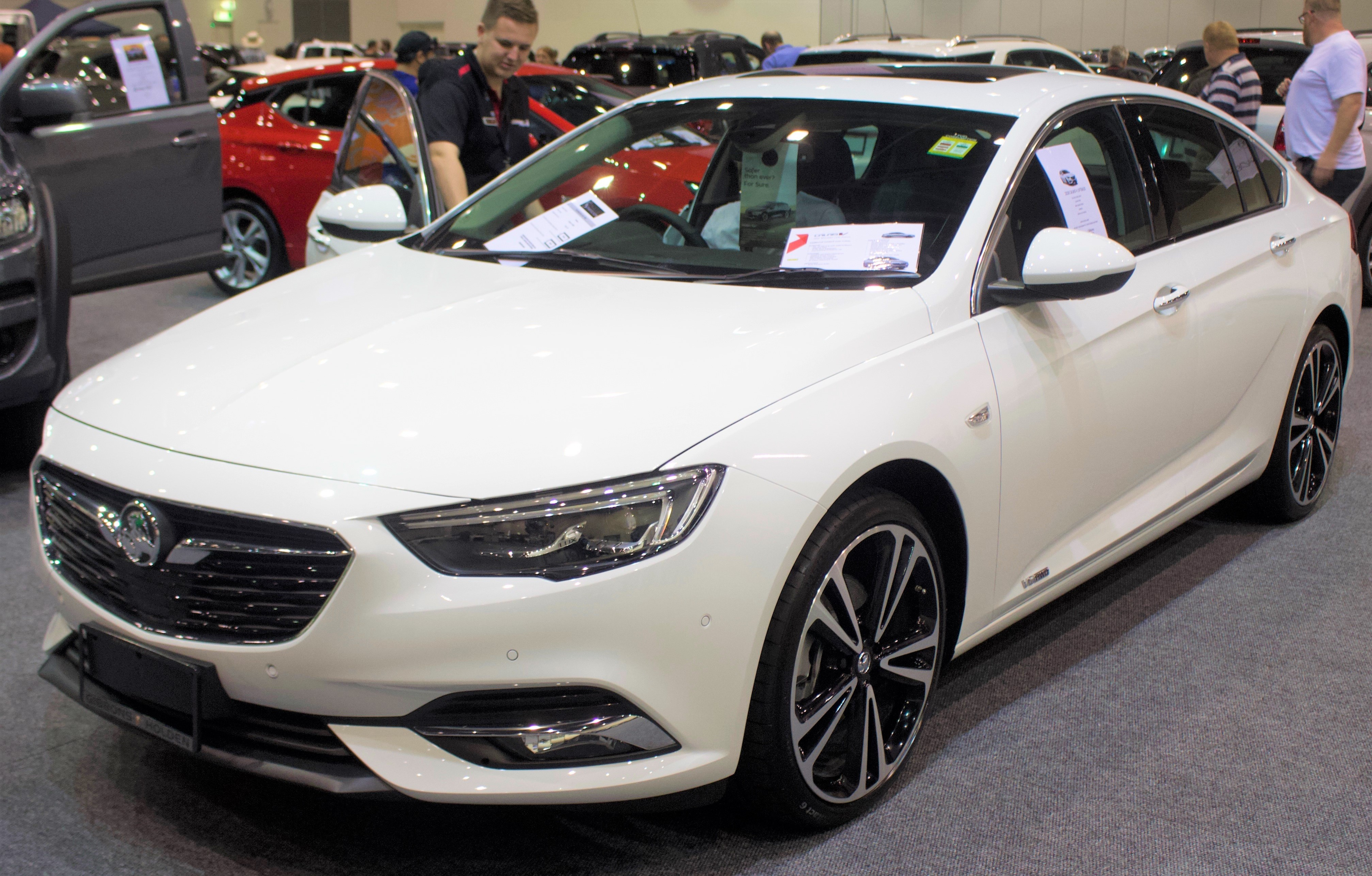
Holden Calais-V

The Calais-V was the flagship luxury model. It featured 20-inch alloy wheels, 360 degree camera, IntelliLux Matrix LED headlights, sunroof, and massaging front seats. It was available as a liftback or Tourer. It was available with only the 3.6-litre V6 and AWD.

== Motorsport ==
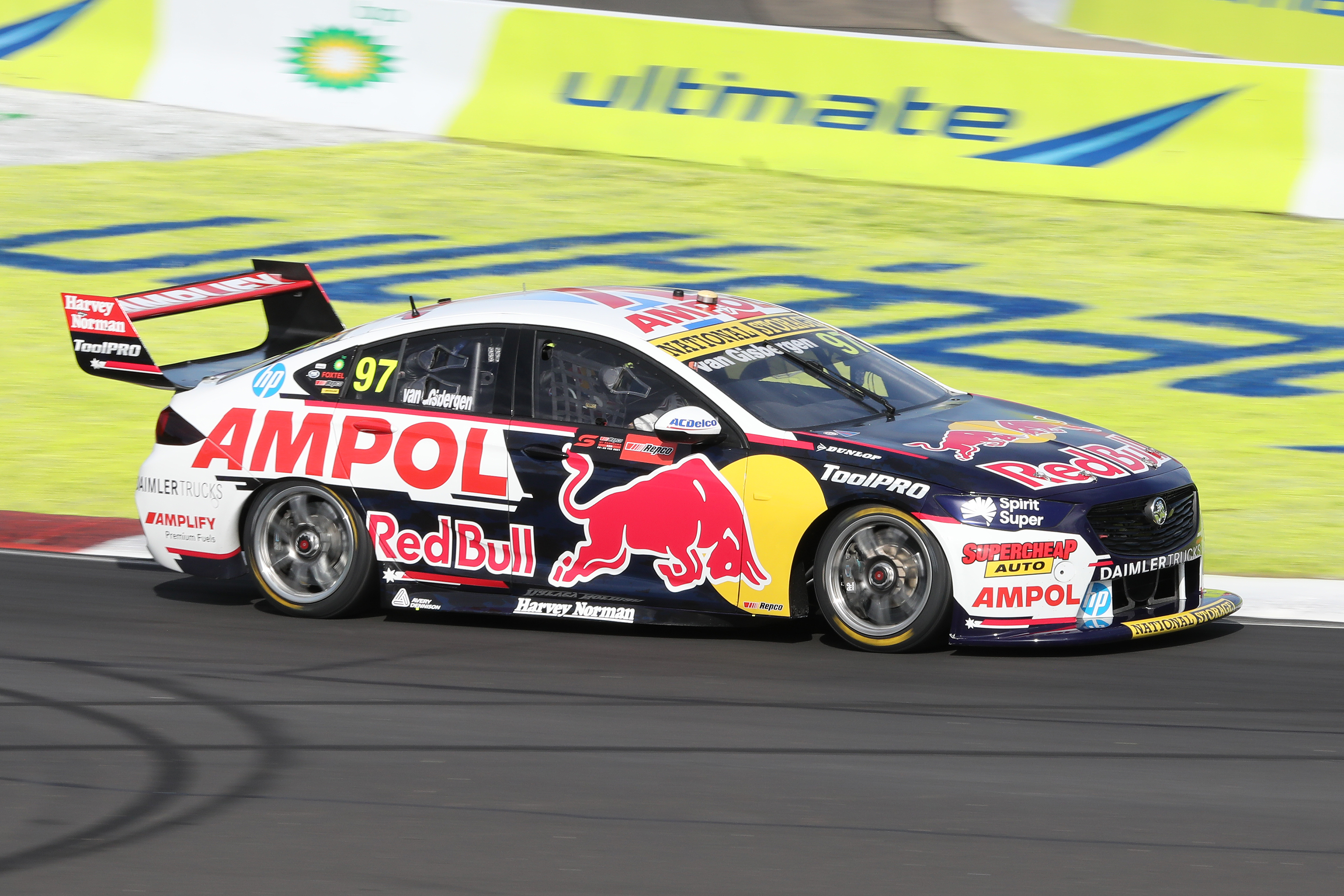
Supercars Holden Commodore ZB driven by Shane van Gisbergen at the 2021 Mount Panorama 500

For marketing purposes, the ZB Commodore was raced in various motorsport disciplines, including Supercars. However, the race cars generally had no physical or mechanical relationship with the production model, other than similar looks, as an exterior shell was built to resemble the road going cars, with a rear wheel drive tube frame chassis underneath.

=== Supercars Championship ===
The ZB Commodore was used by teams running Holdens in the Supercars Championship. Powered by the same V8 engine as used in the VF, a turbo-charged V6 engine was under development for use in 2019, however the project was cancelled in April 2018 amid engineering concerns that the V6 would not be competitive.

The ZB Commodore proved to be an instant success, prompting Ford to controversially push for upgrades for its ageing FGX Falcon which was in its final year of competition. The ZB failed in its championship success due to the upgraded DJR Team Penske FGX Falcon of Scott McLaughlin triumphing in 2018 before dominating in the Mustang GT from 2019 to 2020. The ZB hit back in both 2021 and 2022 with Shane Van Gisbergen sending both the ZB and Holden off in style due to the brands retirement from both the road and racetrack.

The ZB Commodore achieved Bathurst success immediately with victories in 2018, 2020, 2021 and 2022. The ZB holds the record of 87 victories and being the Commodore that delivered Holden's final Bathurst, championship and race win.

== Sales ==
Sales of the new Commodore commenced in February 2018. The ZB is the first Commodore produced outside of Australia since the nameplate's induction in 1978, leading to much public backlash.

Consumer uptake and acceptance have been the lowest for any Commodore branded vehicle in the history of Holden manufacturing, however, this has also come at the same time as the nameplate has shifted market segment and competition, with the ZB outperforming all but the Toyota Camry in the Medium/Large segment, including the Mazda6 and Ford Mondeo.

	Jan	Feb	Mar	Apr	May	Jun	Jul	Aug	Sep	Oct	Nov	Dec	Total
2018	—N/a	363	516	473	885	946	516	635	672	663	701		6,370

== Future developments ==
When the decision was made to cease vehicle production in Australia and source the ZB Commodore from Europe, Opel was still a subsidiary of GM. That ceased on 1 August 2017 when Opel and Vauxhall were sold to Groupe PSA. These new owners of Opel/Holden have announced that they will transfer the Opel Insignia platform to PSA platforms as early as 2021, which means the current model would be discontinued as PSA plans to export PSA-based, Opel "Holden" models globally from 2018 onwards.

On October 17, 2018, Holden halted production on the Commodore due to slow sales and unsold inventory at its dealerships. The Holden Commodore ceased to exist by the end of 2019, with the ZB becoming convincingly the lowest selling version ever.
