= Cam Waters =

Australian racing driver (born 1994)

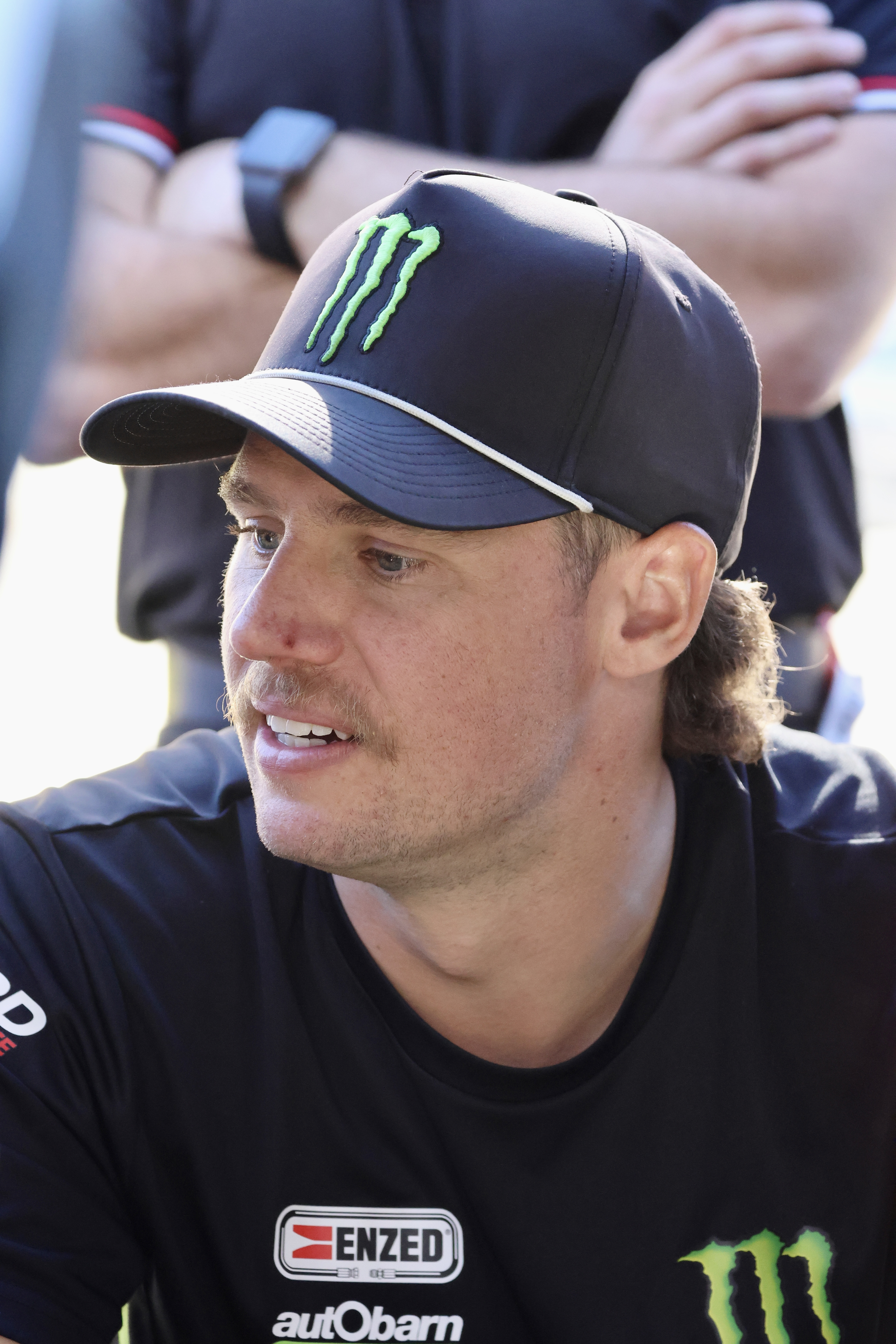
- Waters at the Adelaide Street Circuit in 2025
- Nationality: Australian
- Born: Cameron Christopher Waters; 3 August 1994 (age 32) Mildura, Victoria, Australia
- Categorisation: FIA Silver (until 2017); FIA Gold (2018–2023); FIA Platinum (2024–)

Supercars Championship career
- Current team: Tickford Racing
- Championships: 0
- Races: 334
- Wins: 20
- Podiums: 73
- Pole positions: 34
- 2025 position: 6th (4314 pts)

NASCAR Cup Series career
- 1 race run over 1 year
- 2024 position: 44th
- Best finish: 44th (2024)
- First race: 2024 Toyota/Save Mart 350 (Sonoma)
Wins	Top tens	Poles
0	0	0

NASCAR FedEx Freight Truck Series career
- 3 races run over 2 years
- 2025 position: 47th
- Best finish: 47th (2025)
- First race: 2024 Long John Silver's 200 (Martinsville)
- Last race: 2025 LiUNA! 150 (Lime Rock)
Wins	Top tens	Poles
0	1	0
- Statistics up to date as of 31 October 2025.

Cameron Christopher Waters (born 3 August 1994) is an Australian professional racing driver who competes in the Repco Supercars Championship. He currently drives the No. 6 Ford Mustang GT for Tickford Racing. Waters last competed part-time in the NASCAR Cup Series, driving the No. 60 Ford Mustang Dark Horse for RFK Racing, and part-time in the NASCAR Craftsman Truck Series, driving the No. 66 Ford F-150 for ThorSport Racing. He is the cousin of Australian Superbike champion Josh Waters and currently holds the record for the youngest driver to compete in the Bathurst 1000, after winning the Shannons Supercar Showdown reality TV show in 2011. Waters won the 2015 V8 Supercar Dunlop Series with Prodrive Racing Australia in a Ford FG Falcon.

== Career ==
Waters started his racing career in go-karts in 2001 after competing nationally and winning multiple state championships and winning the J.C Maddox Trophy twice, Waters moved into open-wheelers. Starting in Formula Vee in 2009, before progressing to the Australian Formula Ford Championship in 2010. He claimed podium finishes in three races and finished sixth in the championship standings, which earned him the Rookie of the Year title. Waters went on to win the championship the following season, taking seven race wins. Waters drove for Kelly Racing in the V8 Supercar Development Series at Sandown at the end of the 2011 season and continued on with the team's new initiative, Dreamtime Racing, in the 2012 season before the team was withdrawn for financial reasons.

Also in 2011, Waters won the Shannons Supercar Showdown, a reality TV program run by Kelly Racing where ten drivers are given the opportunity to compete for a drive in the Bathurst 1000. Waters beat British driver Andrew Jordan in the final episode to win the drive alongside Grant Denyer. The pair failed to finish the race, however, after Waters hit the wall at Forrests Elbow and damaged the car. Waters returned to the Bathurst 1000 in 2012 to drive with Jesse Dixon, the winner of the 2012 edition of the Shannons Supercar Showdown, after Denyer injured his shoulder prior to the race. Waters and Dixon were the youngest driver combination in the race's history and finished in a respectable twentieth position.

In the 2013 Dunlop V8 Supercar Series, Waters drove for Minda Motorsport in a VE Commodore, finishing in tenth position in the Championship.

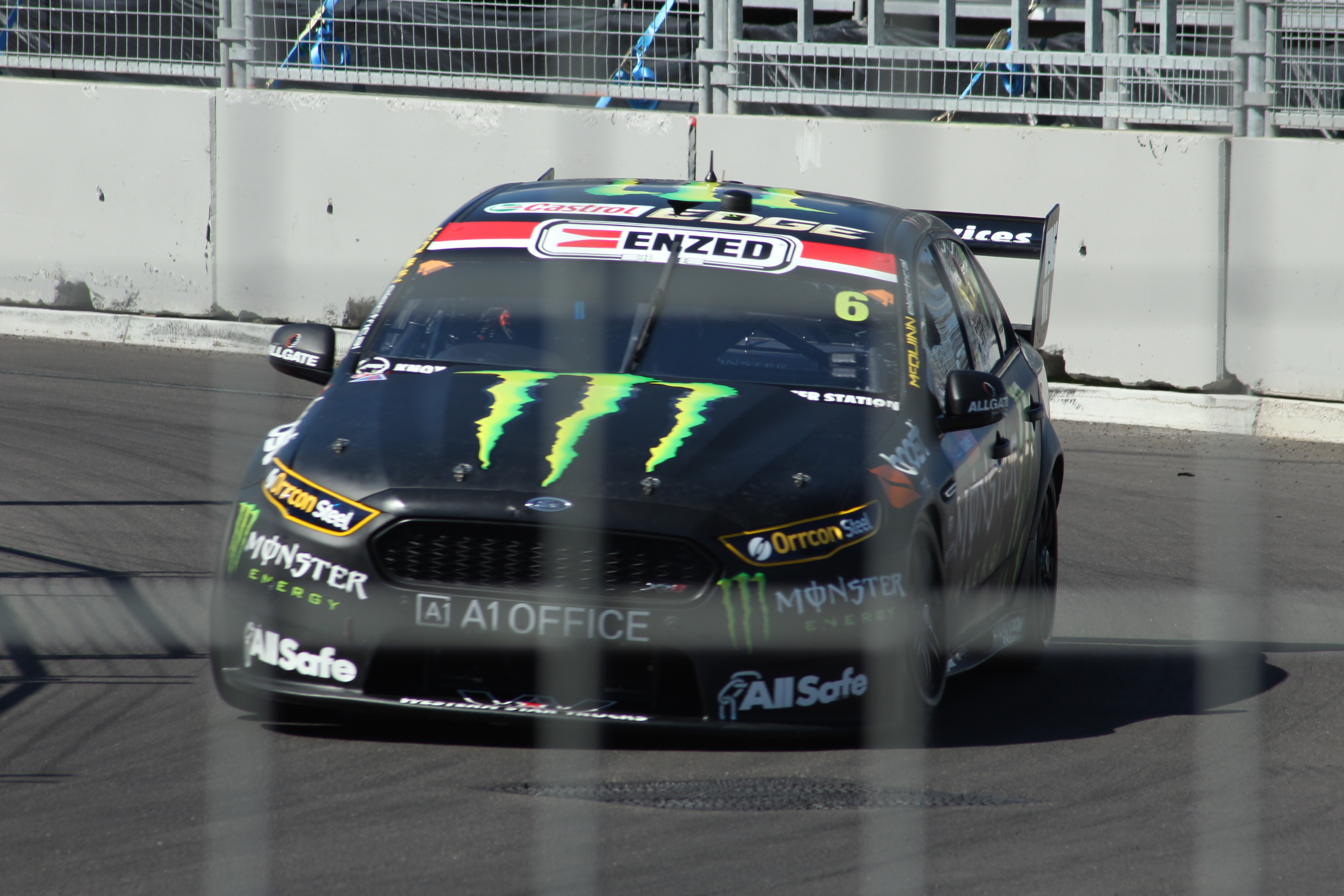
Waters at the 2017 Newcastle 500

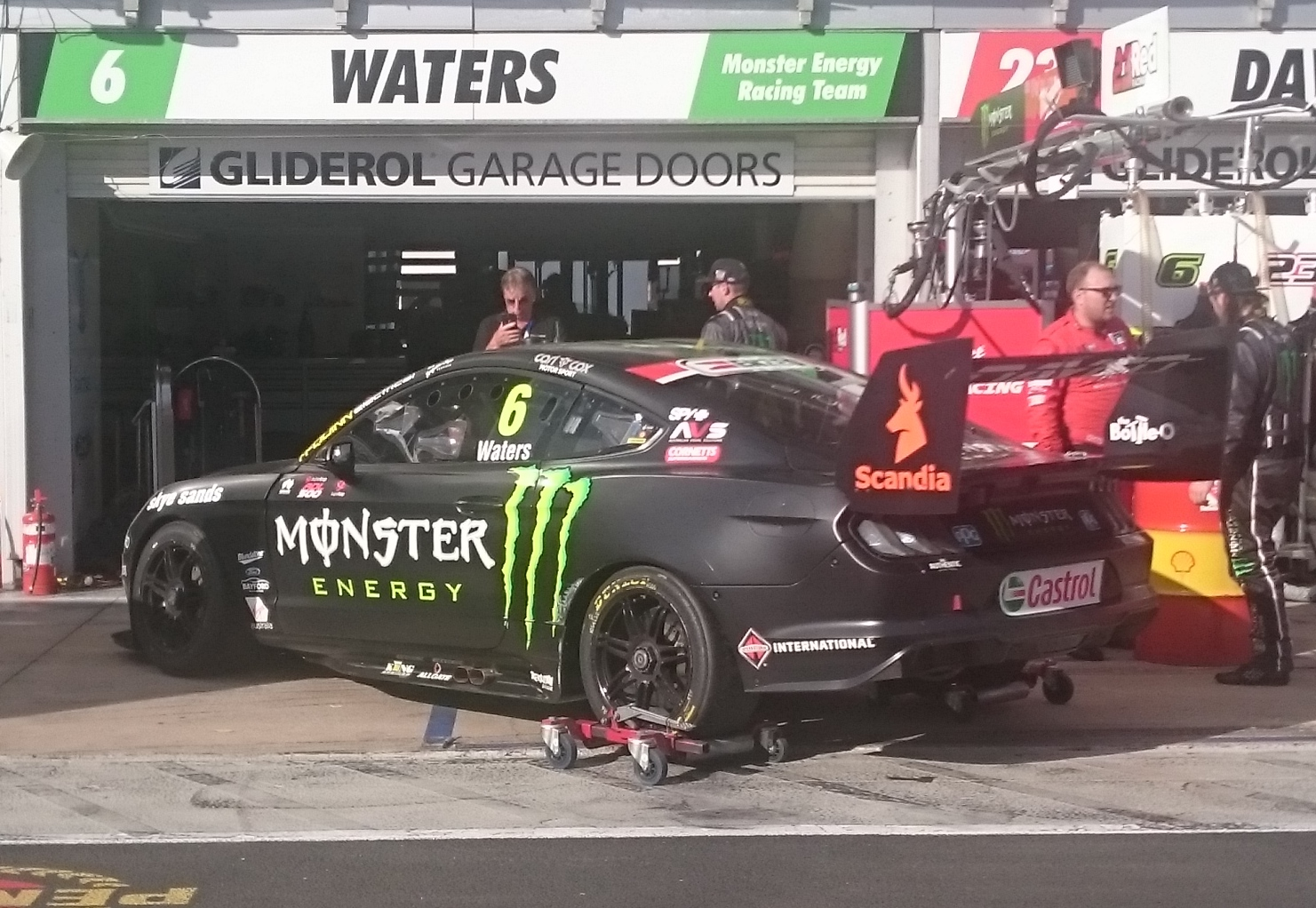
Waters placed seventh in the 2019 Supercars Championship driving a Ford Mustang GT for Tickford Racing

He again drove at Bathurst in 2014 alongside Jack Perkins and claimed a twelfth-place finish. That same year, he finished runner-up in the Dunlop Series. In 2015, it was announced he would join Prodrive Racing Australia for the V8 Supercar Enduro Cup and compete for the team in the Dunlop Series. Waters was runner-up with Chaz Mostert at the Sandown 500 in a one-two finish for Prodrive Racing Australia. At the Bathurst 1000, Mostert had a massive crash, and the car was unable to be repaired, forcing the team to withdraw the entry from the race. Waters replaced Mostert at the Gold Coast, New Zealand, and Phillip Island events while Mostert recovered from injuries sustained in the Bathurst crash. Waters was crowned winner of the 2015 V8 Supercars Dunlop Series at Sydney Olympic Park, beating reigning champion Paul Dumbrell.

It was announced in early March 2016 that Waters would race full-time in the 2016 V8 Supercars Championship with Prodrive Racing Australia driving the No. 6 Ford FG X Falcon, with Mostert moving to the No. 55 Rod Nash Racing customer car.

In 2017, Waters won his first supercars race at the Sandown 500 alongside Richie Stanaway, who also achieved his first win in supercars.

In 2025 at the Sydney 500 Waters won all three races, secured all three pole positions and three fastest laps. During the second race on Saturday, he won over Broc Feeney by 0.0308 seconds, making it the closest race finish since the 1983 Adelaide International Raceway round.

=== NASCAR ===
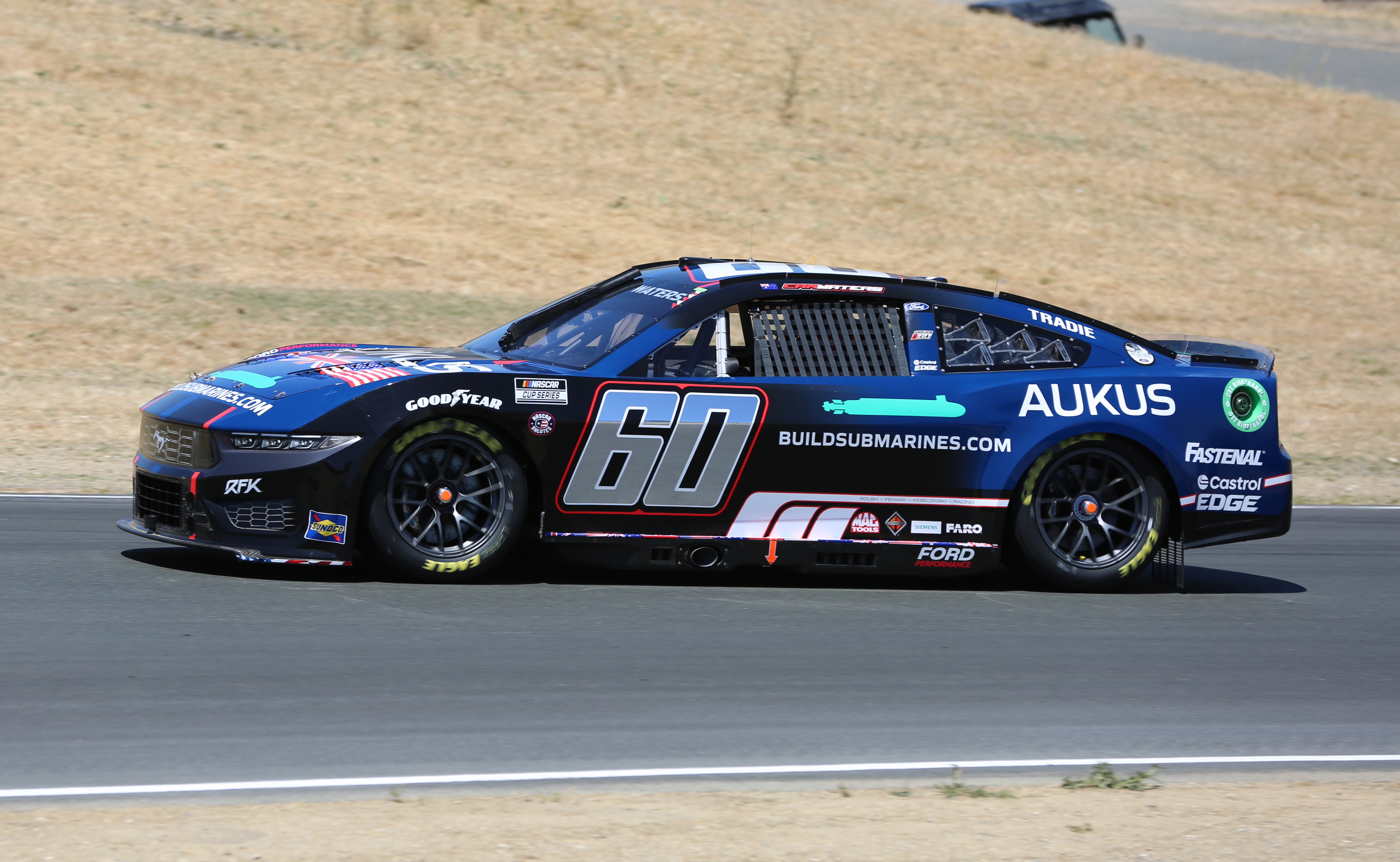
Waters' No. 60 car at Sonoma Raceway in 2024

In late March 2024, it was announced that Waters would make his debut in the NASCAR Craftsman Truck Series at Martinsville Speedway for ThorSport Racing. Two months later, it was announced that Waters will make his NASCAR Cup Series debut at Sonoma Raceway, driving the No. 60 Ford for RFK Racing. Waters started 31st but did make his way inside the top-fifteen during the race before he got caught up in a wreck that would eventually end his race after 66 of the 110 laps relegating him to a 35th place finish.

In June 2025, it was announced that Waters would compete in the inaugural Lime Rock Craftsman Truck Series race for ThorSport Racing.

== Career results ==
=== Karting career summary ===
Season	Series	Position
2006	J.C. Maddox Karting Trophy	**1st**
2007	J.C. Maddox Karting Trophy	**1st**
2008	New South Wales Open Sprint Kart Championships – Junior National Light	6th
2008	Victorian Kart Championships – Junior National Light	**1st**
2008	Queensland Sprint Kart Championships – Junior National Light	5th
2008	South Australian Kart Championships – Junior Clubman	4th
2008	South Australian Kart Championships – Junior National Light	**2nd**
2008	Australian Capital Territory Sprint Kart Championships – Junior National Heavy	**3rd**

=== Circuit racing career summary ===
Season	Series	Position	Car	Team
2009	Victorian Formula Vee Series	7th	Jacer F2K5	Waters Motorsport
2010	Victorian Formula Ford Series	**1st**	Mygale SJ06a	Waters Motorsport
2010	Australian Formula Ford Championship	6th	Mygale SJ06a	Waters Motorsport
2011	Australian Formula Ford Championship	**1st**	Mygale SJ10a	Sonic Motor Racing Services
2011	Fujitsu V8 Supercar Series	35th	Holden VE Commodore	Kelly Racing
2012	Australian Drivers' Championship	13th	Mygale M07 HWA-Mercedes-Benz	G-Force Motorsport
2012	V8SuperTourer Championship	36th	Holden VE Commodore	M2 Motorsport
2012	Dunlop V8 Supercar Series	23rd	Holden VE Commodore	DreamTime Racing
2012	International V8 Supercars Championship	53rd	Holden VE Commodore	Kelly Racing
2013	Dunlop V8 Supercar Series	10th	Holden VE Commodore	Minda Motorsport
2014	Dunlop V8 Supercar Series	**2nd**	Ford FG Falcon	Ford Performance Racing
2014	International V8 Supercars Championship	42nd	Ford FG Falcon	Charlie Schwerkolt Racing
2015	V8 Supercars Dunlop Series	**1st**	Ford FG Falcon	Prodrive Racing Australia
2015	International V8 Supercars Championship	32nd	Ford FG X Falcon	Prodrive Racing Australia
2016	International V8 Supercars Championship	19th	Ford FG X Falcon	Prodrive Racing Australia
2017	Virgin Australia Supercars Championship	8th	Ford FG X Falcon	Prodrive Racing Australia
2018	Virgin Australia Supercars Championship	16th	Ford FG X Falcon	Tickford Racing
2019	Virgin Australia Supercars Championship	7th	Ford Mustang GT	Tickford Racing
2020	Virgin Australia Supercars Championship	**2nd**	Ford Mustang GT	Tickford Racing
2021	Repco Supercars Championship	5th	Ford Mustang GT	Tickford Racing
2022	Repco Supercars Championship	**2nd**	Ford Mustang GT	Tickford Racing
2023	Repco Supercars Championship	6th	Ford Mustang GT S650	Tickford Racing
2024	Repco Supercars Championship	4th	Ford Mustang GT S650	Tickford Racing
2025	Repco Supercars Championship	6th	Ford Mustang GT S650	Tickford Racing

=== Speedway racing career summary ===
Season	Series	Position	Car	Team
2014	Australian Late Model Championship	17th	V8 Dirt Late Model	Waters Motorsport
2015	South Australian Late Model Championship	**1st**	V8 Dirt Late Model	Waters Motorsport
2017	Modified Production Australian Speedway Title	4th	Ford BA Falcon	Shore Motorsport
2018	Modified Production Australian Speedway Title	**1st**	Ford BA Falcon	Shore Motorsport
2019	Modified Production Australian Speedway Title	17th	Ford BA Falcon	Shore Motorsport
2021	Avalon Speedway Presidents Cup Sprintcar Classic	27th	Maxim	Chief Racing
2021	Victorian 360 Sprintcar Championship	19th	Maxim	Chief Racing
2021	Victorian Open Sprintcar Championship	11th	Maxim	Chief Racing
2022	Eureka Garages & Sheds Sprintcar Series	17th	Maxim	Chief Racing
2022	Victorian Open Sprintcar Championship	23rd	Maxim	Chief Racing
2022	Avalon Speedway Presidents Cup Sprintcar Classic	12th	Maxim	Chief Racing
2022	Northline Speedway Chariots of Thunder Series	44th	Maxim	Chief Racing
2023	Avalon Speedway Presidents Cup Sprintcar Classic	17th	Maxim	Chief Racing
2023	Victorian Open Sprintcar Championship	6th	Maxim	Chief Racing
2023	50th Grand Annual Sprintcar Classic	23rd	Maxim	Chief Racing
2023	Easter Sprintcar Trail	5th	Maxim	Chief Racing
2024	Borderline Speedway Kings Sprintcar Challenge	13th	Maxim	Chief Racing
2024	51st Grand Annual Sprintcar Classic	17th	Maxim	Chief Racing
2024	61st Australian Sprintcar Championship	9th	Maxim	Chief Racing
2024	NASCAR Cup Series	44th	Ford Mustang	RFK Racing
2024	NASCAR Craftsman Truck Series	50th	Ford F150	ThorSport Racing
2025	Brandt Sprincar Speedweek	8th	Maxim	Chief Racing
2025	South Australian Sprintcar Championship	21st	Maxim	Chief Racing
2025	52nd Grand Annual Sprintcar Classic	11th	Maxim	Chief Racing
2025	Max Dumsney Sprintcar Classic	38th	Maxim	Chief Racing
2025	Avalon Speedway Presidents Cup Sprintcar Classic	22nd	Maxim	Chief Racing
2025	NASCAR Craftsman Truck Series	47th	Ford F150	ThorSport Racing

=== Super2 Series results ===
(key) (Race results only)

Super2 Series results
Year	Team	No.	Car	1	2	3	4	5	6	7	8	9	10	11	12	13	14	15	16	17	18	Position	Points
2011	Kelly Racing	77	Holden VE Commodore	ADE; R1	ADE; R2	PER; R3	PER; R4	TSV; R5	TSV; R6	TSV; R7	IPS; R8	IPS; R9	IPS; R10	BAT; R11	BAT; R12	SAN; R13; 15	SAN; R14; 7	SAN; R15; Ret	SOP; R16	SOP; R17		35th	86
2012	Kelly Racing	77	Holden VE Commodore	ADE; R1; Ret	ADE; R2; DNS	PER; R3; 18	PER; R4; 15	PER; R5; 11	TSV; R6; 12	TSV; R7; Ret	TSV; R8; 12	IPS; R9; 8	IPS; R10; 7	IPS; R11; 17	BAT; R12	BAT; R13	WIN; R14	WIN; R15	WIN; R16	HOM; R17	HOM; R18	23rd	384
2013	Minda Motorsport	98	Holden VE Commodore	ADE; R1; 10	ADE; R2; 8	PER; R3; 6	PER; R4; 23	PER; R5; 8	TSV; R6; 28	TSV; R7; 19	TSV; R8; DSQ	IPS; R9; 26	IPS; R10; 14	IPS; R11; 11	WIN; R12; 5	WIN; R13; 7	WIN; R14; 11	BAT; R15; 14	BAT; R16; 21	HOM; R17; 7	HOM; R18; 7	10th	956
2014	Ford Performance Racing	56	Ford FG Falcon	**ADE**; **R1**; **2**	ADE; R2; 22	WIN; R3; 1	WIN; R4; 4	PER; R5; 7	PER; R6; Ret	**TSV**; **R7**; **21**	**TSV**; **R8**; **2**	**IPS**; **R9**; **19**	IPS; R10; 3	BAT; R11; 2	HOM; R12; 2	**HOM**; **R13**; **1**						2nd	1439
2015	Prodrive Racing Australia	5	Ford FG Falcon	**ADE**; **R1**; **1**	**ADE**; **R2**; **2**	PER; R3; 1	**PER**; **R4**; **1**	**PER**; **R5**; **1**	**WIN**; **R6**; **1**	**WIN**; **R7**; **1**	**WIN**; **R8**; **1**	**TSV**; **R9**; **1**	TSV; R10; 2	IPS; R11; 1	IPS; R12; 1	IPS; R13; 3	BAT; R14; 2	HOM; R15; 8	HOM; R16; 2			1st	1966

=== Supercars Championship results ===
Supercars results
Year	Team	No.	Car	1	2	3	4	5	6	7	8	9	10	11	12	13	14	15	16	17	18	19	20	21	22	23	24	25	26	27	28	29	30	31	32	33	34	35	36	37	38	39	Position	Points
2011	Kelly Racing	77	Holden VE Commodore	YMC; R1	YMC; R2	ADE; R3	ADE; R4	HAM; R5	HAM; R6	BAR; R7	BAR; R8	BAR; R9	WIN; R10	WIN; R11	HID; R12	HID; R13	TOW; R14	TOW; R15	QLD; R16	QLD; R17	QLD; R18	PHI; Q	PHI; R19	BAT; R20; Ret	SUR; R21	SUR; R22	SYM; R23	SYM; R24	SAN; R25	SAN; R26	SYD; R27	SYD; R28											NC	0
2012	Kelly Racing	23	Holden VE Commodore	ADE; R1	ADE; R2	SYM; R3	SYM; R4	HAM; R5	HAM; R6	BAR; R7	BAR; R8	BAR; R9	PHI; R10	PHI; R11	HID; R12	HID; R13	TOW; R14	TOW; R15	QLD; R16	QLD; R17	SMP; R18	SMP; R19	SAN; Q	SAN; R20	BAT; R21; 20	SUR; R22	SUR; R23	YMC; R24	YMC; R25	YMC; R26	WIN; R27	WIN; R28	SYD; R29	SYD; R30									53rd	90
2014	Charlie Schwerkolt Racing	18	Ford FG Falcon	ADE; R1	ADE; R2	ADE; R3	SYM; R4	SYM; R5	SYM; R6	WIN; R7	WIN; R8	WIN; R9	PUK; R10	PUK; R11	PUK; R12	PUK; R13	BAR; R14	BAR; R15	BAR; R16	HID; R17	HID; R18	HID; R19	TOW; R20	TOW; R21	TOW; R22	QLD; R23	QLD; R24	QLD; R25	SMP; R26	SMP; R27	SMP; R28	SAN; QR; 18	SAN; R29; 15	BAT; R30; 12	SUR; R31; Ret	SUR; R32; 14	PHI; R33	PHI; R34	PHI; R35	SYD; R36	SYD; R37	SYD; R38	42nd	321
2015	Prodrive Racing Australia	6	Ford FG X Falcon	ADE; R1	ADE; R2	ADE; R3	SYM; R4	SYM; R5	SYM; R6	BAR; R7	BAR; R8	BAR; R9	WIN; R10	WIN; R11	WIN; R12	HID; R13; PO	HID; R14; PO	HID; R15; PO	TOW; R16	TOW; R17	QLD; R18; PO	QLD; R19; PO	QLD; R20; PO	SMP; R21; PO	SMP; R22; PO	SMP; R23; PO	**SAN**; **QR**; **3**	SAN; R24; 2	BAT; R25; DNS	SUR; R26; 17	SUR; R27; 19	PUK; R28; 17	PUK; R29; 12	PUK; R30; 22	PHI; R31; 9	PHI; R32; 15	PHI; R33; 20	SYD; R34	SYD; R35	SYD; R36			32nd	595
2016	Prodrive Racing Australia	6	Ford FG X Falcon	ADE; R1; 15	ADE; R2; 12	ADE; R3; 4	SYM; R4; 7	SYM; R5; Ret	PHI; R6; 18	PHI; R7; 23	**BAR**; **R8**; **13**	BAR; R9; 26	WIN; R10; 16	WIN; R11; 5	HID; R12; 24	HID; R13; 22	TOW; R14; 16	TOW; R15; 6	QLD; R16; Ret	QLD; R17; 16	SMP; R18; 20	SMP; R19; 16	SAN; QR; 26	SAN; R20; Ret	BAT; R21; 4	SUR; R22; Ret	SUR; R23; 14	PUK; R24; 12	PUK; R25; 17	PUK; R26; 20	PUK; R27; 17	SYD; R28; 21	SYD; R29; Ret										19th	1423
2017	Prodrive Racing Australia	6	Ford FG X Falcon	ADE; R1; 4	ADE; R2; 8	SYM; R3; 10	SYM; R4; 6	PHI; R5; 19	PHI; R6; 6	BAR; R7; 19	BAR; R8; 12	WIN; R9; 22	WIN; R10; 4	HID; R11; 6	HID; R12; 9	TOW; R13; 5	TOW; R14; 14	QLD; R15; 16	QLD; R16; 8	SMP; R17; 17	SMP; R18; Ret	SAN; QR; 1	**SAN**; **R19**; **1**	BAT; R20; 16	SUR; R21; 2	SUR; R22; 21	**PUK**; **R23**; **9**	PUK; R24; 3	NEW; R25; 13	NEW; R26; 23													8th	2173
2018	Tickford Racing	6	Ford FG X Falcon	ADE; R1; 16	ADE; R2; 5	MEL; R3; 11	MEL; R4; 5	MEL; R5; 9	MEL; R6; 22	SYM; R7; 20	SYM; R8; 13	PHI; R9; 16	PHI; R10; 17	BAR; R11; 6	BAR; R12; 13	WIN; R13; Ret	WIN; R14; 26	HID; R15; 12	HID; R16; 25	TOW; R17; 8	TOW; R18; 9	QLD; R19; 22	QLD; R20; 17	SMP; R21; 19	BEN; R22; 13	BEN; R23; 15	SAN; QR; 13	SAN; R24; 13	BAT; R25; 23	SUR; R26; 8	SUR; R27; C	PUK; R28; 7	PUK; R29; 12	NEW; R30; 14	NEW; R31; 14								16th	1873
2019	Tickford Racing	6	Ford Mustang S550	ADE; R1; 22	ADE; R2; 2	MEL; R3; 3	MEL; R4; 3	MEL; R5; DNS	MEL; R6; 4	SYM; R7; 11	SYM; R8; 11	PHI; R9; Ret	PHI; R10; 6	BAR; R11; 8	BAR; R12; 3	WIN; R13; 11	WIN; R14; 6	HID; R15; 4	HID; R16; 4	TOW; R17; 21	**TOW**; **R18**; **3**	QLD; R19; 6	QLD; R20; 6	BEN; R21; 9	BEN; R22; 8	PUK; R23; 2	PUK; R24; 14	BAT; R25; 20	SUR; R26; 4	SUR; R27; 5	SAN; QR; 14	SAN; R28; 21	NEW; R29; 5	NEW; R30; 8									7th	2588
2020	Tickford Racing	6	Ford Mustang S550	ADE; R1; 6	ADE; R2; 3	MEL; R3; C	MEL; R4; C	MEL; R5; C	MEL; R6; C	SMP; R7; 6	SMP; R8; 6	SMP; R9; 13	SMP2; R10; 6	SMP2; R11; 9	SMP2; R12; 18	HID1; R13; 8	HID1; R14; 9	HID1; R15; 11	HID2; R16; 3	HID2; R17; 5	HID2; R18; Ret	TOW1; R19; 2	TOW1; R20; 4	TOW1; R21; 2	TOW2; R22; 2	TOW2; R23; 5	TOW2; R24; 12	BEN1; R25; 5	BEN1; R26; 8	BEN1; R27; 5	BEN2; R28; 3	BEN2; R29; 3	BEN2; R30; 1	**BAT**; **R31**; **2**									2nd	2125
2021	Tickford Racing	6	Ford Mustang S550	**BAT1**; **R1**; **20**	BAT1; R2; 2	SAN; R3; 2	SAN; R4; 2	SAN; R5; 6	SYM; R6; 6	**SYM**; **R7**; **4**	**SYM**; **R8**; **4**	BEN; R9; 4	BEN; R10; Ret	BEN; R11; 1	HID; R12; 2	HID; R13; 7	HID; R14; 8	TOW1; R15; 8	TOW1; R16; 6	TOW2; R17; 1	TOW2; R18; 11	**TOW2**; **R19**; **1**	SMP1; R20; 13	SMP1; R21; 13	SMP1; R22; 6	SMP2; R23; 8	SMP2; R24; 13	SMP2; R25; 8	SMP3; R26; 22	SMP3; R27; 15	SMP3; R28; 7	SMP4; R29; 3	SMP4; R30; C	BAT2; R31; 2									5th	2369
2022	Tickford Racing	6	Ford Mustang S550	SMP; R1; 11	SMP; R2; 4	**SYM**; **R3**; **3**	SYM; R4; 17	SYM; R5; 6	MEL; R6; 18	MEL; R7; 21	MEL; R8; 8	MEL; R9; 7	BAR; R10; 3	BAR; R11; 4	BAR; R12; 7	WIN; R13; 1	**WIN**; **R14**; **2**	**WIN**; **R15**; **1**	HID; R16; 7	**HID**; **R17**; **1**	HID; R18; 3	TOW; R19; 3	**TOW**; **R20**; **3**	BEN; R21; 4	**BEN**; **R22**; **4**	**BEN**; **R23**; **2**	SAN; R24; 5	SAN; R25; 7	SAN; R26; 10	**PUK**; **R27**; **3**	PUK; R28; 3	PUK; R29; 2	**BAT**; **R30**; **3**	SUR; R31; 5	SUR; R32; 7	**ADE**; **R33**; **13**	ADE; R34; 4						2nd	2908
2023	Tickford Racing	6	Ford Mustang S650	NEW; R1; 1	NEW; R2; 12	MEL; R3; 7	MEL; R4; 19	MEL; R5; 10	MEL; R6; 10	BAR; R7; 22	BAR; R8; 8	BAR; R9; 6	SYM; R10; 4	SYM; R11; 4	SYM; R12; 7	**HID**; **R13**; **Ret**	HID; R14; 12	HID; R15; 5	TOW; R16; 5	**TOW**; **R17**; **15**	SMP; R18; 5	SMP; R19; 6	BEN; R20; 4	BEN; R21; 24	BEN; R22; 2	SAN; R23; 20	BAT; R24; Ret	**SUR**; **R25**; **1**	SUR; R26; 3	ADE; R27; 1	ADE; R28; 4												6th	2099
2024	Tickford Racing	6	Ford Mustang S650	BAT1; R1; 22	BAT1; R2; 16	MEL; R3; 5	**MEL**; **R4**; **7**	MEL; R5; Ret	MEL; R6; 7	**TAU**; **R7**; **8**	TAU; R8; 9	BAR; R9; 3	**BAR**; **R10**; **1**	HID; R11; 10	HID; R12; 15	**TOW**; **R13**; **1**	TOW; R14; 2	**SMP**; **R15**; **7**	SMP; R16; 2	SYM; R17; 4	SYM; R18; 1	SAN; R19; 6	BAT; R20; 4	**SUR**; **R21**; **1**	SUR; R22; 4	**ADE**; **R23**; **3**	ADE; R24; 10																4th	2551
2025	Tickford Racing	6	Ford Mustang S650	**SYD**; **R1**; **1**	**SYD**; **R2**; **1**	**SYD**; **R3**; **1**	MEL; R4; 6	MEL; R5; 6	MEL; R6; 8	MEL; R7; C	TAU; R8; 2	TAU; R9; 14	TAU; R10; 12	SYM; R11; 4	SYM; R12; 3	SYM; R13; 12	BAR; R14; 7	BAR; R15; 4	BAR; R16; 4	HID; R17; 2	HID; R18; 10	HID; R19; 24	TOW; R20; 2	TOW; R21; 20	TOW; R22; 4	QLD; R23; 17	QLD; R24; 5	QLD; R25; 2	BEN; R26; 2	BAT; R27; 12	SUR; R28; 4	SUR; R29; 5	SAN; R30; 12	SAN; R31; 21	ADE; R32; 12	ADE; R33; 8	ADE; R34; 12						6th	4314
2026	Tickford Racing	6	Ford Mustang S650	SMP; R1; 5	SMP; R2; 4	SMP; R3; 3	MEL; R4; 6	MEL; R5; 4	MEL; R6; 3	MEL; R7; 6	TAU; R8; 21	TAU; R9; 9	CHR; R10; 7	CHR; R11; 7	CHR; R12; 8	CHR; R13; 5	SYM; R14; 12	SYM; R15; 7	SYM; R16; 10	HID; R17; 1	**HID**; **R18**; **2**	**HID**; **R19**; **3**	TOW; R20; 1	TOW; R21; 4	**TOW**; **R22**; **3**	BAR; R23; 4	BAR; R24; 9	BAR; R25; 4	QLD; R26; 8	QLD; R27	QLD; R28	BEN; R28	BAT; R30	SUR; R31	SUR; R32	SAN; R33	SAN; R34	ADE; R35	ADE; R36	ADE; R37			3rd*	1718*

=== Complete Bathurst 1000 results ===
Year	Team	Car	Co-driver	Position	Laps
2011	Kelly Racing	Holden Commodore VE	(Australia) Grant Denyer	DNF	95
2012	Kelly Racing	Holden Commodore VE	(Australia) Jesse Dixon	20th	158
2014	Charlie Schwerkolt Racing	Ford Falcon FG	(Australia) Jack Perkins	12th	161
2015	Prodrive Racing Australia	Ford Falcon FG X	(Australia) Chaz Mostert	DNS	0
2016	Prodrive Racing Australia	Ford Falcon FG X	(Australia) Jack Le Brocq	4th	161
2017	Prodrive Racing Australia	Ford Falcon FG X	(New Zealand) Richie Stanaway	16th	159
2018	Tickford Racing	Ford Falcon FG X	(Australia) David Russell	23rd	148
2019	Tickford Racing	Ford Mustang Mk.6	(Australia) Michael Caruso	20th	148
2020	Tickford Racing	Ford Mustang Mk.6	(Australia) Will Davison	**2nd**	161
2021	Tickford Racing	Ford Mustang Mk.6	(Australia) James Moffat	**2nd**	161
2022	Tickford Racing	Ford Mustang Mk.6	(Australia) James Moffat	**3rd**	161
2023	Tickford Racing	Ford Mustang S650	(Australia) James Moffat	DNF	70
2024	Tickford Racing	Ford Mustang S650	(Australia) James Moffat	4th	161
2025	Tickford Racing	Ford Mustang S650	(Australia) Mark Winterbottom	12th	161
2026	Tickford Racing	Ford Mustang S650	(Australia) Mark Winterbottom		

=== The Bend 500 Results ===
Year	Team	Car	Co-driver	Position	Laps
2025	Tickford Racing	Ford Mustang S650	(Australia) Mark Winterbottom	**2nd**	102
2026	Tickford Racing	Ford Mustang S650	(Australia) Mark Winterbottom		

=== Complete Bathurst 12 Hour results ===
Year	Team	Co-drivers	Car	Class	Laps	Overall position	Class position
2018	(United Kingdom) Strakka Racing	(United Kingdom) Nick Leventis (United Kingdom) Lewis Williamson (Italy) David Fumanelli	Mercedes-AMG GT3	APA	271	7th	**3rd**
2022	(Australia) C Tech Laser by Tony Bates Racing	(Australia) David Reynolds (Australia) Tony Bates	Audi R8 LMS Evo II	APA	256	11th	9th
2024	(Australia) Scott Taylor Motorsport	(Australia) Craig Lowndes (Australia) Thomas Randle	Mercedes-AMG GT3 Evo	**P**	275	7th	7th
2025	(Australia) Scott Taylor Motorsport	(Australia) Craig Lowndes (Australia) Thomas Randle	Mercedes-AMG GT3 Evo	**P**	35	DNF	
2026	(Australia) Scott Taylor Motorsport	(Australia) Thomas Randle (Australia) Chaz Mostert	Mercedes-AMG GT3 Evo	**P**	238	DNF	

=== NASCAR ===
(key) (Bold – Pole position awarded by qualifying time. Italics – Pole position earned by points standings or practice time. * – Most laps led. ** – All laps led.)

==== Cup Series ====
NASCAR Cup Series results
Year	Team	No.	Make	1	2	3	4	5	6	7	8	9	10	11	12	13	14	15	16	17	18	19	20	21	22	23	24	25	26	27	28	29	30	31	32	33	34	35	36	NCSC	Pts	Ref
2024	RFK Racing	60	Ford	DAY	ATL	LVS	PHO	BRI	COA	RCH	MAR	TEX	TAL	DOV	KAN	DAR	CLT	GTW	SON; 35	IOW	NHA	NSH	CSC	POC	IND	RCH	MCH	DAY	DAR	ATL	GLN	BRI	KAN	TAL	ROV	LVS	HOM	MAR	PHO	44th	2	

==== Craftsman Truck Series ====
NASCAR Craftsman Truck Series results
Year	Team	No.	Make	1	2	3	4	5	6	7	8	9	10	11	12	13	14	15	16	17	18	19	20	21	22	23	24	25	NCTC	Pts	Ref
2024	ThorSport Racing	66	Ford	DAY	ATL	LVS	BRI	COA	MAR; 30	TEX	KAN; 19	DAR	NWS	CLT	GTW	NSH	POC	IRP	RCH	MLW	BRI	KAN	TAL	HOM	MAR	PHO			50th	25	
2025	ThorSport Racing	66	Ford	DAY	ATL	LVS	HOM	MAR	BRI	CAR	TEX	KAN	NWS	CLT	NSH	MCH	POC	LRP; 5	IRP	GLN	RCH	DAR	BRI	NHA	ROV	TAL	MAR	PHO	47th	32	

^{*} Season still in progress
^{1} Ineligible for series points

Sporting positions
Preceded by Luke Ellery	Victorian Formula Ford Championship; Champion; 2010	Succeeded by Sam Power
Preceded by Chaz Mostert	Australian Formula Ford Championship; Champion; 2011	Succeeded by Jack Le Brocq
Preceded by Paul Dumbrell	V8 Supercars Dunlop Series; Champion; 2015	Succeeded by Garry Jacobson
Preceded by Garth Tander; Warren Luff	Winner of the Sandown 500; 2017; With Richie Stanaway	Succeeded by Jamie Whincup; Paul Dumbrell
Preceded by Matty Smith	Australian Modified Sedan Championship; Champion; 2018	Succeeded by Kye Walters
Awards and achievements
Preceded by Ashley Walsh	Mike Kable Young Gun Award; 2016	Succeeded by Will Brown
Preceded by Lucas Auer	Allan Simonsen Trophy (Pole position Bathurst 12 Hour); 2026	Succeeded by Incumbent
