= 2011 Fujitsu V8 Supercar Series =

Motor racing competition

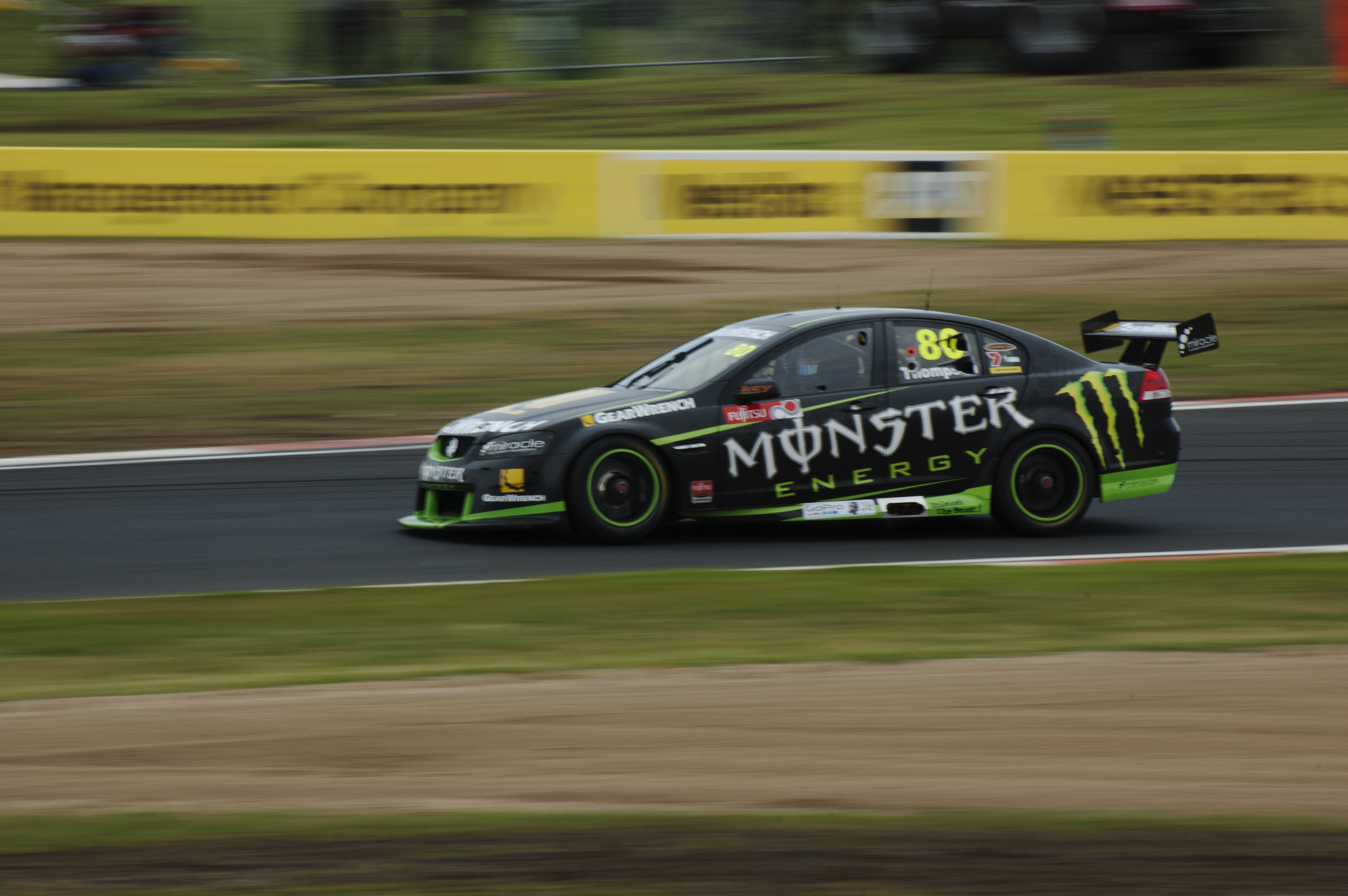
Andrew Thompson won the 2011 Fujitsu V8 Supercar Series.

The 2011 Fujitsu V8 Supercars Series was the twelfth running of the V8 Supercar Development series, an Australian touring car racing series for V8 Supercars. It acted as the principal support category at seven 2011 International V8 Supercars Championship events. The series began on 17 March at the Adelaide Street Circuit and ended on 3 December at the Homebush Street Circuit after 17 races held at seven rounds.

Andrew Thompson, driving a Triple Eight Race Engineering prepared Holden VE Commodore, dominated the series, winning eleven of the 17 races. Thompson won by 306 points over Jack Perkins who drove a Sonic Motor Racing Services Ford BF Falcon. Perkins defeated third placed David Russell (MW Motorsport Ford BF Falcon) by seven points, after winning the final race of the year at the Homebush Street Circuit.

The six races not won by Thompson included Race 2 at the Adelaide Street Circuit which was won in emotional circumstances by Jason Richards driving a Greg Murphy Racing Holden VE Commodore, the Brad Jones Racing driver from the V8 Supercars Championship taking a guest drive during a break in his treatment for a serious illness. Other race wins were attained by Tim Blanchard who won the reverse grid race at the Townsville Street Circuit in a Ford BF Falcon, Scott McLaughlin, who won Race 1 at Queensland Raceway in a Stone Brothers Racing Ford BF Falcon, former series winner Andrew Jones who won the reverse grid race at Queensland Raceway in a Brad Jones Racing prepared Holden VE Commodore and Jack Perkins, who won two late season races at Sandown Raceway and the Homebush Street Circuit.

== Calendar ==
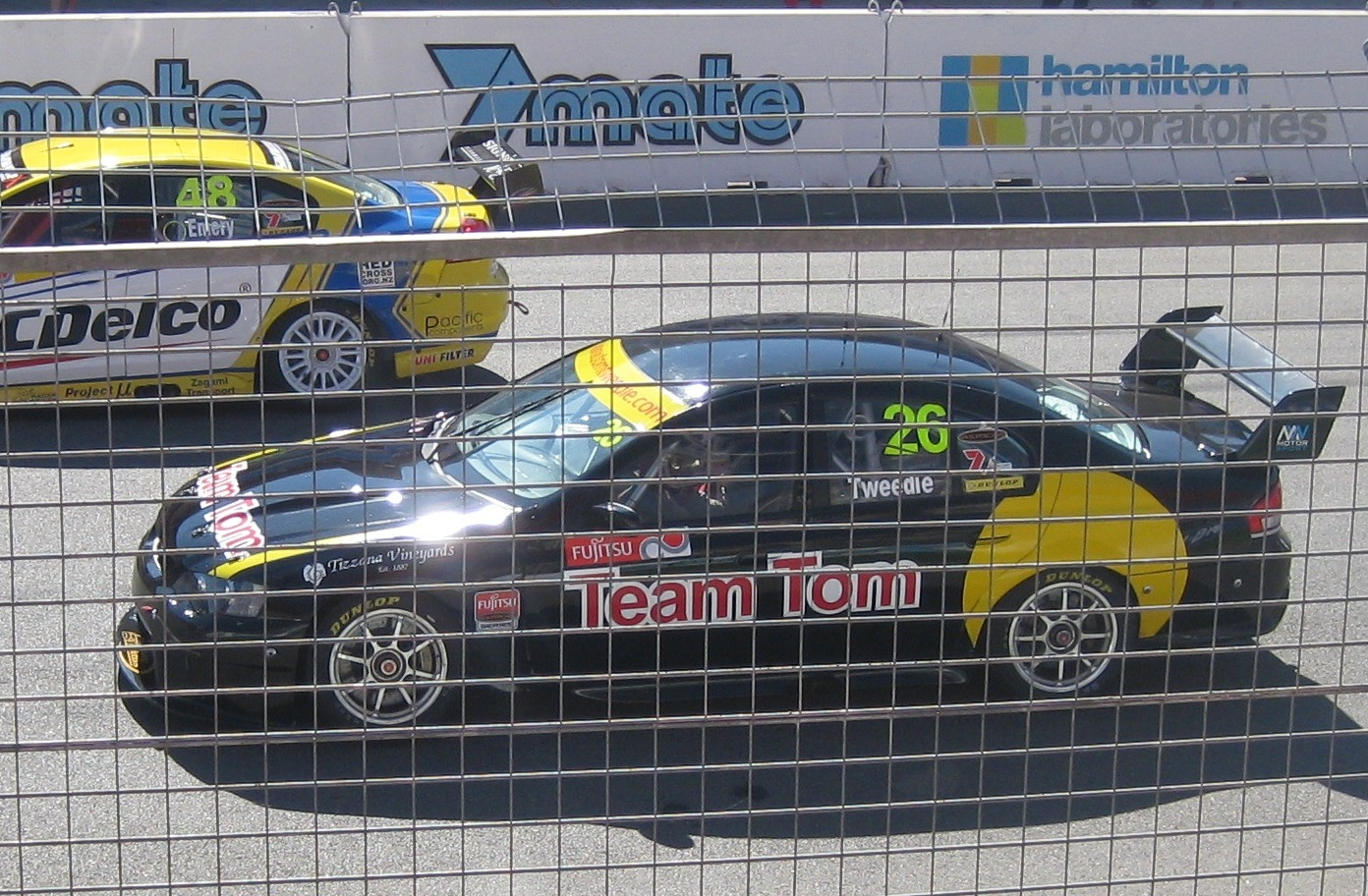
The Ford BF Falcon of Tom Tweedie at the Adelaide round

The 2011 Fujitsu V8 Supercar Series was contested over seven rounds:

Rd.	Event	Circuit	Location	Date	Winner
1	(South Australia) Clipsal 500	Adelaide Street Circuit	Adelaide, South Australia	17–20 March	(Australia) Nick Percat
2	(Western Australia) Trading Post Perth Challenge	Barbagallo Raceway	Perth, Western Australia	29 April – 1 May	(Australia) Andrew Thompson
3	(Queensland) Sucrogen Townsville 400	Townsville Street Circuit	Townsville, Queensland	8–10 July	(Australia) Andrew Thompson
4	(Queensland) Coates Hire Ipswich 300	Queensland Raceway	Ipswich, Queensland	19–21 August	(Australia) Andrew Thompson
5	(New South Wales) Supercheap Auto Bathurst 1000	Mount Panorama Circuit	Bathurst, New South Wales	6–9 October	(Australia) Andrew Thompson
6	(Victoria (state)) Norton 360 Sandown Challenge	Sandown Raceway	Melbourne, Victoria	18–20 November	(Australia) Andrew Thompson
7	(New South Wales) Sydney Telstra 500	Homebush Street Circuit	Sydney, New South Wales	3–5 December	(Australia) Andrew Thompson

== Teams and drivers ==
The following teams and drivers contested the 2011 Fujitsu V8 Supercar Series. This was the last season in which the Holden VZ Commodore was eligible to compete.

Team	Car	No.	Driver	Rounds
Miles Racing	Ford BF Falcon	10	(Australia) Chaz Mostert	1–5
Miles Racing	Ford BF Falcon	10	(Australia) Luke Youlden	6
Miles Racing	Ford BF Falcon	90	(Australia) Ashley Walsh	1–5
Sieders Racing Team	Ford BF Falcon	13	(Australia) Colin Sieders	1, 3, 5, 7
Brad Jones Racing	Holden VE Commodore	20	(Australia) Andrew Jones	3–4, 7
Triple F Racing	Ford BF Falcon	23	(Australia) Todd Fiore	1–5
Greg Murphy Racing	Holden VE Commodore	24	(Australia) Tony Bates	1, 3–7
Greg Murphy Racing	Holden VE Commodore	24	(Australia) Matt Hansen	2
Greg Murphy Racing	Holden VE Commodore	45	(New Zealand) Jason Richards	1
Greg Murphy Racing	Holden VE Commodore	45	(Australia) James Brock	3–5
Greg Murphy Racing	Holden VE Commodore	45	(New Zealand) Nick Cassidy	6–7
Greg Murphy Racing	Holden VE Commodore	48	(Australia) Geoff Emery	All
Greg Murphy Racing	Holden VE Commodore	51	(New Zealand) Daniel Jilesen	All
Paul Freestone Racing	Ford BF Falcon	25	(Australia) Paul Freestone	1, 5
MW Motorsport	Ford BF Falcon	26	(Australia) Tom Tweedie	All
MW Motorsport	Ford BF Falcon	27	(Australia) Tim Blanchard	All
MW Motorsport	Ford BF Falcon	28	(Australia) David Russell	All
Eggleston Motorsport	Holden VE Commodore	38	(Australia) Cameron McConville	3–4
Eggleston Motorsport	Holden VE Commodore	38	(Australia) Gavin Bullas	5
Eggleston Motorsport	Holden VZ Commodore	54	(Australia) Lindsay Yelland	3
Jay Motorsport	Holden VZ Commodore	43	(Australia) Jay Verdnik	1
Matt Stone Racing	Holden VE Commodore	50	(Australia) Stephen Voight	5
Matt Stone Racing	Ford BF Falcon	86	(Republic of Ireland) Robert Cregan	All
Ford Performance Racing	Ford FG Falcon	56	(Australia) Chaz Mostert	6
Ford Performance Racing	Ford FG Falcon	100	(Australia) Chaz Mostert	7
Novocastrian Motorsport	Ford BF Falcon	58	(Australia) Drew Russell	All
Novocastrian Motorsport	Ford BF Falcon	59	(Australia) Aaren Russell	All
Warrin Mining	Holden VZ Commodore; Holden VE Commodore	62	(Australia) Adam Wallis	1, 4–5
Paul Morris Motorsport	Holden VE Commodore	67	(Australia) Paul Morris	2–7
Action Racing	Holden VE Commodore	71	(Australia) Marcus Zukanovic	All
Brett Stewart Racing	Holden VE Commodore	73	(Australia) Brett Stewart	2–7
McGill Motorsport	Ford BF Falcon	75	(Australia) Aaron McGill	All
Kelly Racing	Holden VE Commodore	77	(Australia) Grant Denyer	4
Kelly Racing	Holden VE Commodore	77	(Australia) Cameron Waters	6
Triple Eight Race Engineering	Holden VE Commodore	80	(Australia) Andrew Thompson	All
Tony D'Alberto Racing	Holden VE Commodore	83	(Australia) David Wall	1–2, 4–7
Tony D'Alberto Racing	Holden VE Commodore	83	(Australia) Dale Wood	3
Fastaz Motorsport	Holden VZ Commodore	92	(Australia) Taz Douglas	1–4, 6–7
Stone Brothers Racing	Ford BF Falcon; Ford FG Falcon	93	(New Zealand) Scott McLaughlin	All
Batavia Coast Motorsport	Ford BF Falcon	95	(Australia) Nathan Vince	1–2
Walkinshaw Racing	Holden VE Commodore	222	(Australia) Nick Percat	All
Sonic Motor Racing Services	Ford FG Falcon	777	(Australia) Rodney Jane	All
Sonic Motor Racing Services	Ford BF Falcon	999	(Australia) Jack Perkins	All

== Series standings ==
Pos.	Driver	No.	ADE		BAR		TOW			QLD			BAT		SAN			SYD		Pen	Pts
1	(Australia) Andrew Thompson	80	1	16	1	1	1	5	1	2	9	1	1	1	6	1	1	1	3		1907
2	(Australia) Jack Perkins	999	3	21	2	4	6	2	2	10	7	7	3	3	1	11	3	5	1	25	1601
3	(Australia) David Russell	28	8	13	4	2	2	4	3	5	3	2	2	2	4	16	5	4	8	25	1594
4	(New Zealand) Scott McLaughlin	93	7	2	3	3	16	13	8	1	5	5	10	5	5	Ret	4	10	4		1461
5	(Australia) Tim Blanchard	27	4	4	11	9	9	1	11	11	14	6	6	6	7	2	18	6	19		1262
6	(Australia) Chaz Mostert	10/56	9	6	8	6	10	10	13	14	4	17	11	7	2	15	2	3	5	65	1253
7	(Australia) Nick Percat	222	2	3	Ret	16	3	6	5	Ret	6	8	4	8	3	Ret	Ret	2	2	50	1207
8	(Australia) Paul Morris	67			22	DSQ	5	19	4	3	2	3	5	4	Ret	3	6	7	Ret	25	944
9	(Australia) Rodney Jane	777	11	8	5	19	7	17	9	6	Ret	Ret	7	Ret	13	8	9	Ret	16	50	827
10	(New Zealand) Daniel Jilesen	51	10	5	6	5	8	3	7	Ret	23	Ret	Ret	10	DNS	18	13	Ret	11	25	816
11	(Australia) David Wall	83	13	7	15	11				8	8	9	8	Ret	8	Ret	DNS	11	18		754
12	(Republic of Ireland) Robert Cregan	86	17	9	9	8	Ret	15	12	Ret	19	16	Ret	14	18	10	11	20	17		747
13	(Australia) Aaren Russell	59	21	Ret	16	10	Ret	26	15	21	17	13	13	11	16	12	15	12	15		733
14	(Australia) Geoff Emery	48	15	Ret	12	12	Ret	18	18	Ret	Ret	Ret	14	9	10	5	7	13	6	25	732
15	(Australia) Tom Tweedie	26	16	14	13	14	11	16	17	18	18	12	12	Ret	14	9	12	DNS	DNS		696
16	(Australia) Drew Russell	58	6	Ret	Ret	13	12	11	Ret	Ret	11	11	DNS	11	12	Ret	19	9	9		670
17	(Australia) Aaron McGill	75	Ret	17	20	17	18	24	23	19	24	24	20	17	19	19	17	19	7		657
18	(Australia) Tony Bates	24	22	11			20	20	14	7	25	22	16	Ret	9	Ret	Ret	15	10		598
19	(Australia) Taz Douglas	92	5	Ret	11	7	19	14	22	Ret	13	23			Ret	14	14	14	14	50	576
20	(Australia) Marcus Zukanovic	71	DNS	DNS	7	18	4	7	Ret	Ret	21	18	9	Ret	17	6	8	Ret	DNS	25	553
21	(Australia) Andrew Jones	20					15	8	10	9	1	10						8	13	25	466
22	(Australia) Brett Stewart	73			23	Ret	21	25	24	20	20	Ret	22	15	21	17	DNS	18	20		414
23	(Australia) Todd Fiore	23	23	10	17	Ret	Ret	DNS	DNS	13	15	15	21	16							391
24	(Australia) Cameron McConville	38					13	9	6	4	12	4									389
25	(Australia) Colin Sieders	13	18	20			17	21	19				19	Ret				16	12		368
26	(Australia) James Brock	45					Ret	23	20	12	16	19	15	13							343
27	(Australia) Ashley Walsh	90	Ret	15	10	15	Ret	22	16	15	Ret	21	DNS	DNS							341
28	(Australia) Adam Wallis	62	19	12						17	22	20	18	Ret							263
29	(New Zealand) Jason Richards	45	12	1																	219
30	(Australia) Nathan Vince	95	20	19	19	20															186
31	(New Zealand) Nick Cassidy	45													20	13	10	17	Ret	25	153
32	(Australia) Luke Youlden	10													11	4	16				151
33	(Australia) Grant Denyer	77								16	10	14									129
34	(Australia) Paul Freestone	25	Ret	18									17	Ret							105
35	(Australia) Cameron Waters	77													15	7	Ret				86
36	(Australia) Jay Verdnik	43	14	Ret																	63
37	(Australia) Dale Wood	83					Ret	12	21												61
38	(Australia) Matt Hansen	24			18	Ret															51
39	(Australia) Stephen Voight	50											Ret	DNS							0
40	(Australia) Lindsay Yelland	54					DNS	DNS	DNS												0
41	(Australia) Gavin Bullas	38											DNS	DNS							0

Colour	Result
Gold	Winner
Silver	Second place
Bronze	Third place
Green	Points classification
Blue	Non-points classification
Blue	Non-classified finish (NC)
Purple	Retired, not classified (Ret)
Red	Did not qualify (DNQ)
Red	Did not pre-qualify (DNPQ)
Black	Disqualified (DSQ)
White	Did not start (DNS)
White	Withdrew (WD)
White	Race cancelled (C)
Blank	Did not practice (DNP)
Blank	Did not arrive (DNA)
Blank	Excluded (EX)

== See also ==
2011 V8 Supercar season
