= 2019 Adelaide 500 =

2019 V8 Supercar championship race

(South Australia) 2019 Adelaide 500
Event Information
- Round 1 of 15 in the 2019 Supercars Championship
- Layout of the Adelaide Street Circuit
- Date: 1–3 March 2019
- Location: Adelaide, South Australia
- Venue: Adelaide Street Circuit
- Weather: Fine

Results
Race 1
| Distance | 78 laps | 251.736 km |
| Pole position | Fabian Coulthard; DJR Team Penske | 1:19.8918 |
| Winner | Scott McLaughlin; DJR Team Penske | 1:48:02.4642 |
Race 2
| Distance | 71 laps | 228.549 km |
| Pole position | Scott McLaughlin; DJR Team Penske | 1:19.6626 |
| Winner | Scott McLaughlin; DJR Team Penske | 1:39:52.5906 |

The 2019 Adelaide 500 (known for commercial reasons as the 2019 Superloop Adelaide 500) is a motor racing event for the Supercars Championship held on Thursday 28 February through to Sunday 3 March 2019. The event was held at the Adelaide Street Circuit in Adelaide, South Australia, and marked the twenty-first running of the Adelaide 500. It wasl the first event of fifteen in the 2019 Supercars Championship and consisted of two races of 250 kilometres. The race was supported by the opening round of the 2019 Super2 Series, a championship for older models of Supercars.

The race saw the competitive début of the Ford Mustang GT, which replaced the FG X Falcon. The Adelaide 500 was the first time that a Mustang had competed in a round of the Australian Touring Car Championship since 1990.

McLaughlin's win in Race One was the first time that the Ford Mustang had won a race in the Australian Touring Car Championship since Allan Moffat won the final round of the 1972 season at Oran Park Raceway 46 years earlier - in that instance won in a Boss 302 Mk.1 edition.

== Results ==
=== Race 1 ===
==== Race ====
| Pos | No. | Driver | Team | Car | Laps | Time / Retired | Grid | Points |
|---|---|---|---|---|---|---|---|---|
| 1 | 17 | (New Zealand) Scott McLaughlin | DJR Team Penske | Ford Mustang GT | 78 | 1:48:02.4642 | 3 | 150 |
| 2 | 88 | (Australia) Jamie Whincup | Triple Eight Race Engineering | Holden Commodore ZB | 78 | +12.9651 | 2 | 138 |
| 3 | 97 | (New Zealand) Shane van Gisbergen | Triple Eight Race Engineering | Holden Commodore ZB | 78 | +13.9536 | 5 | 129 |
| 4 | 23 | (Australia) Will Davison | 23Red Racing | Ford Mustang GT | 78 | +14.9425 | 7 | 120 |
| 5 | 55 | (Australia) Chaz Mostert | Tickford Racing | Ford Mustang GT | 78 | +17.5715 | 12 | 111 |
| 6 | 12 | (New Zealand) Fabian Coulthard | DJR Team Penske | Ford Mustang GT | 78 | +22.2900 | 1 | 102 |
| 7 | 8 | (Australia) Nick Percat | Brad Jones Racing | Holden Commodore ZB | 78 | +33.2791 | 8 | 96 |
| 8 | 9 | (Australia) David Reynolds | Erebus Motorsport | Holden Commodore ZB | 78 | +33.7720 | 6 | 90 |
| 9 | 18 | (Australia) Mark Winterbottom | Team 18 | Holden Commodore ZB | 78 | +49.3665 | 16 | 84 |
| 10 | 22 | (Australia) James Courtney | Walkinshaw Andretti United | Holden Commodore ZB | 78 | +55.9699 | 9 | 78 |
| 11 | 15 | (Australia) Rick Kelly | Kelly Racing | Nissan Altima L33 | 78 | +1:03.3401 | 10 | 72 |
| 12 | 35 | (Australia) Todd Hazelwood | Matt Stone Racing | Holden Commodore ZB | 78 | +1:04.3076 | 20 | 69 |
| 13 | 7 | (New Zealand) Andre Heimgartner | Kelly Racing | Nissan Altima L33 | 78 | +1:05.8463 | 13 | 66 |
| 14 | 34 | (Australia) James Golding | Garry Rogers Motorsport | Holden Commodore ZB | 78 | +1:08.6808 | 18 | 63 |
| 15 | 78 | (Switzerland) Simona de Silvestro | Kelly Racing | Nissan Altima L33 | 78 | +1:10.5826 | 21 | 60 |
| 16 | 99 | (Australia) Anton de Pasquale | Erebus Motorsport | Holden Commodore ZB | 78 | +1:20.1106 | 23 | 57 |
| 17 | 14 | (Australia) Tim Slade | Brad Jones Racing | Holden Commodore ZB | 77 | +1 lap | 11 | 54 |
| 18 | 33 | (New Zealand) Richie Stanaway | Garry Rogers Motorsport | Holden Commodore ZB | 77 | +1 lap | 17 | 51 |
| 19 | 3 | (Australia) Garry Jacobson | Kelly Racing | Nissan Altima L33 | 77 | +1 lap | 19 | 48 |
| 20 | 19 | (Australia) Jack Le Brocq | Tekno Autosports | Holden Commodore ZB | 77 | +1 lap | 22 | 45 |
| 21 | 5 | (Australia) Lee Holdsworth | Tickford Racing | Ford Mustang GT | 72 | +6 laps | 14 | 42 |
| 22 | 6 | (Australia) Cam Waters | Tickford Racing | Ford Mustang GT | 64 | +14 laps | 4 | 39 |
| NC | 2 | (Australia) Scott Pye | Walkinshaw Andretti United | Holden Commodore ZB | 25 | Accident damage | 15 | |
| DNS | 21 | (Australia) Macauley Jones | Tim Blanchard Racing | Holden Commodore ZB | | Practice accident | | |

=== Race 2 ===
==== Race ====
| Pos | No. | Driver | Team | Car | Laps | Time / Retired | Grid | Points |
|---|---|---|---|---|---|---|---|---|
| 1 | 17 | (New Zealand) Scott McLaughlin | DJR Team Penske | Ford Mustang GT | 71 | 1:39:52.5906 | 1 | 150 |
| 2 | 6 | (Australia) Cam Waters | Tickford Racing | Ford Mustang GT | 71 | +2.3854 | 4 | 138 |
| 3 | 97 | (New Zealand) Shane van Gisbergen | Triple Eight Race Engineering | Holden Commodore ZB | 71 | +2.9399 | 2 | 129 |
| 4 | 14 | (Australia) Tim Slade | Brad Jones Racing | Holden Commodore ZB | 71 | +18.3979 | 11 | 120 |
| 5 | 8 | (Australia) Nick Percat | Brad Jones Racing | Holden Commodore ZB | 71 | +18.9551 | 6 | 111 |
| 6 | 18 | (Australia) Mark Winterbottom | Team 18 | Holden Commodore ZB | 71 | +24.9389 | 24 | 102 |
| 7 | 88 | (Australia) Jamie Whincup | Triple Eight Race Engineering | Holden Commodore ZB | 71 | +25.4198 | 12 | 96 |
| 8 | 23 | (Australia) Will Davison | 23Red Racing | Ford Mustang GT | 71 | +27.5699 | 5 | 90 |
| 9 | 9 | (Australia) David Reynolds | Erebus Motorsport | Holden Commodore ZB | 71 | +31.5020 | 3 | 84 |
| 10 | 35 | (Australia) Todd Hazelwood | Matt Stone Racing | Holden Commodore ZB | 71 | +32.0484 | 7 | 78 |
| 11 | 5 | (Australia) Lee Holdsworth | Tickford Racing | Ford Mustang GT | 71 | +32.4748 | 14 | 72 |
| 12 | 22 | (Australia) James Courtney | Walkinshaw Andretti United | Holden Commodore ZB | 71 | +37.2973 | 15 | 69 |
| 13 | 7 | (New Zealand) Andre Heimgartner | Kelly Racing | Nissan Altima L33 | 71 | +39.5892 | 17 | 66 |
| 14 | 99 | (Australia) Anton de Pasquale | Erebus Motorsport | Holden Commodore ZB | 71 | +41.2157 | 8 | 63 |
| 15 | 55 | (Australia) Chaz Mostert | Tickford Racing | Ford Mustang GT | 71 | +46.4307 | 9 | 60 |
| 16 | 78 | (Switzerland) Simona de Silvestro | Kelly Racing | Nissan Altima L33 | 71 | +47.3152 | 19 | 57 |
| 17 | 2 | (Australia) Scott Pye | Walkinshaw Andretti United | Holden Commodore ZB | 71 | +51.0877 | 13 | 54 |
| 18 | 33 | (New Zealand) Richie Stanaway | Garry Rogers Motorsport | Holden Commodore ZB | 71 | +52.0555 | 18 | 51 |
| 19 | 34 | (Australia) James Golding | Garry Rogers Motorsport | Holden Commodore ZB | 71 | +58.5711 | 21 | 48 |
| 20 | 12 | (New Zealand) Fabian Coulthard | DJR Team Penske | Ford Mustang GT | 71 | +1:02.8636 | 10 | 45 |
| 21 | 19 | (Australia) Jack Le Brocq | Tekno Autosports | Holden Commodore ZB | 68 | +3 laps | 22 | 42 |
| 22 | 3 | (Australia) Garry Jacobson | Kelly Racing | Nissan Altima L33 | 67 | +4 laps | 23 | 39 |
| 23 | 21 | (Australia) Macauley Jones | Tim Blanchard Racing | Holden Commodore ZB | 57 | +14 laps | 20 | 36 |
| 24 | 15 | (Australia) Rick Kelly | Kelly Racing | Nissan Altima L33 | 55 | +16 laps | 16 | 33 |

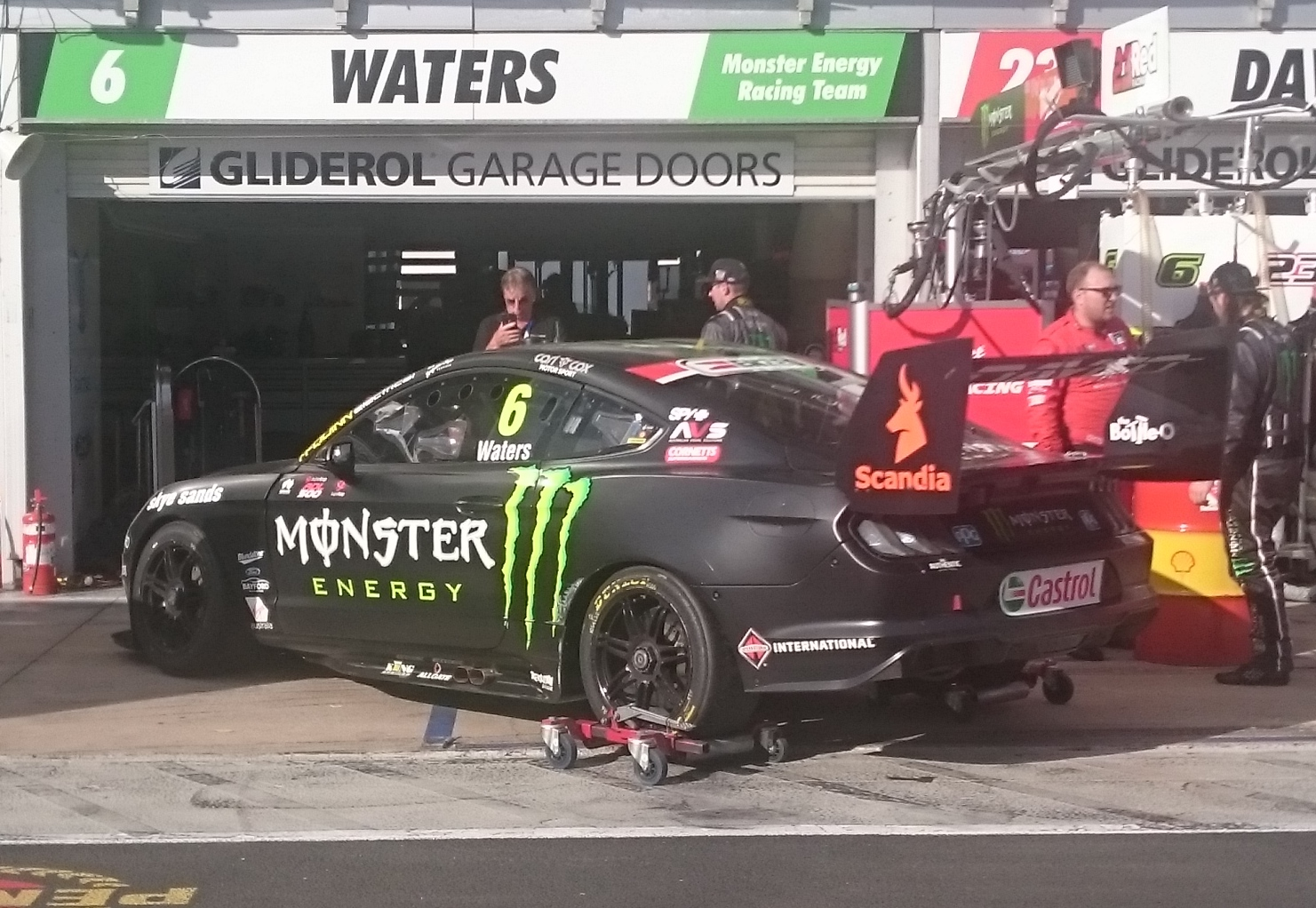
Cam Waters placed second in Race 2 driving a Ford Mustang GT for Tickford Racing

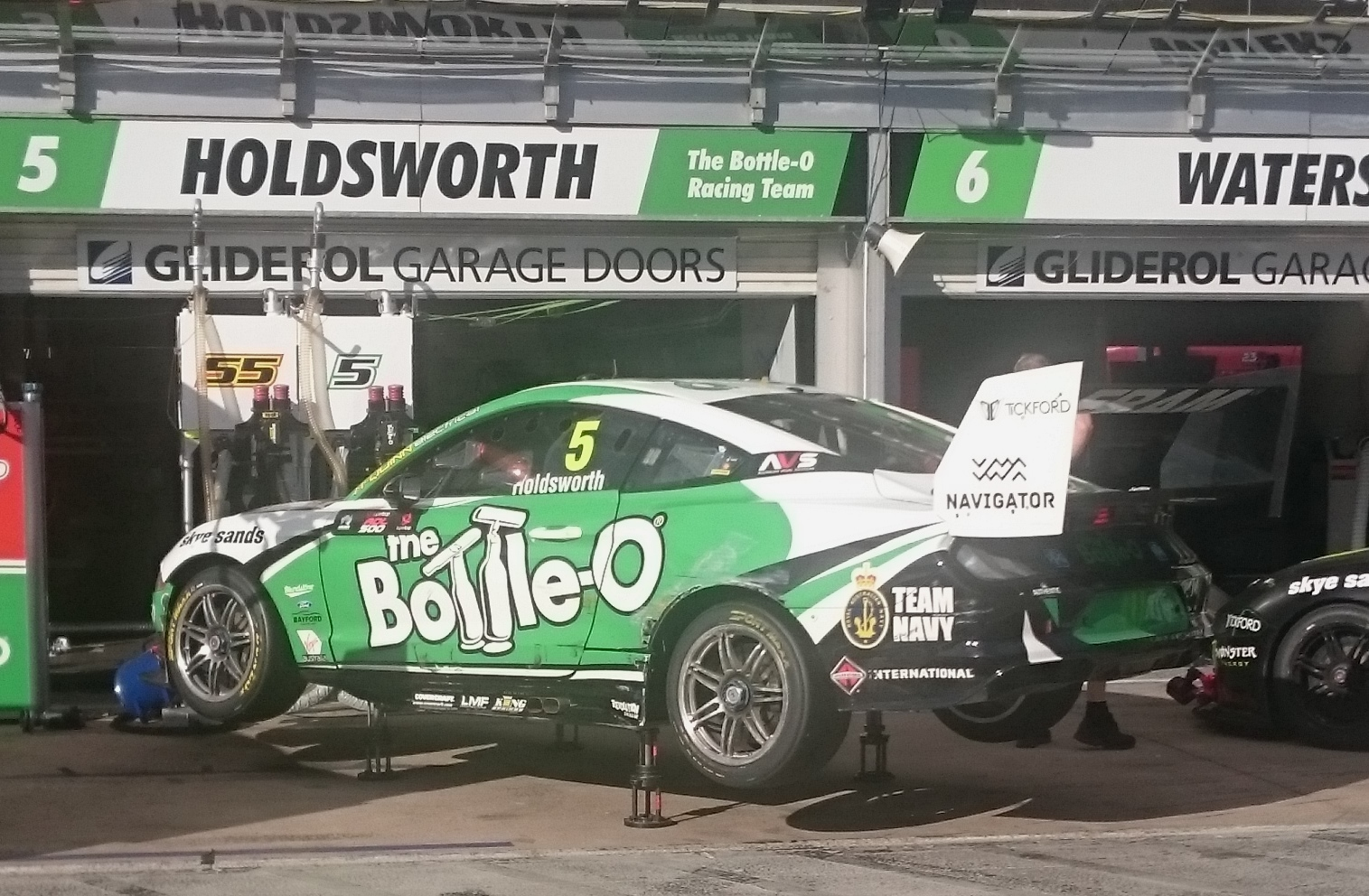
Lee Holdsworth placed eleventh in Race 2 driving a Ford Mustang GT for Tickford Racing

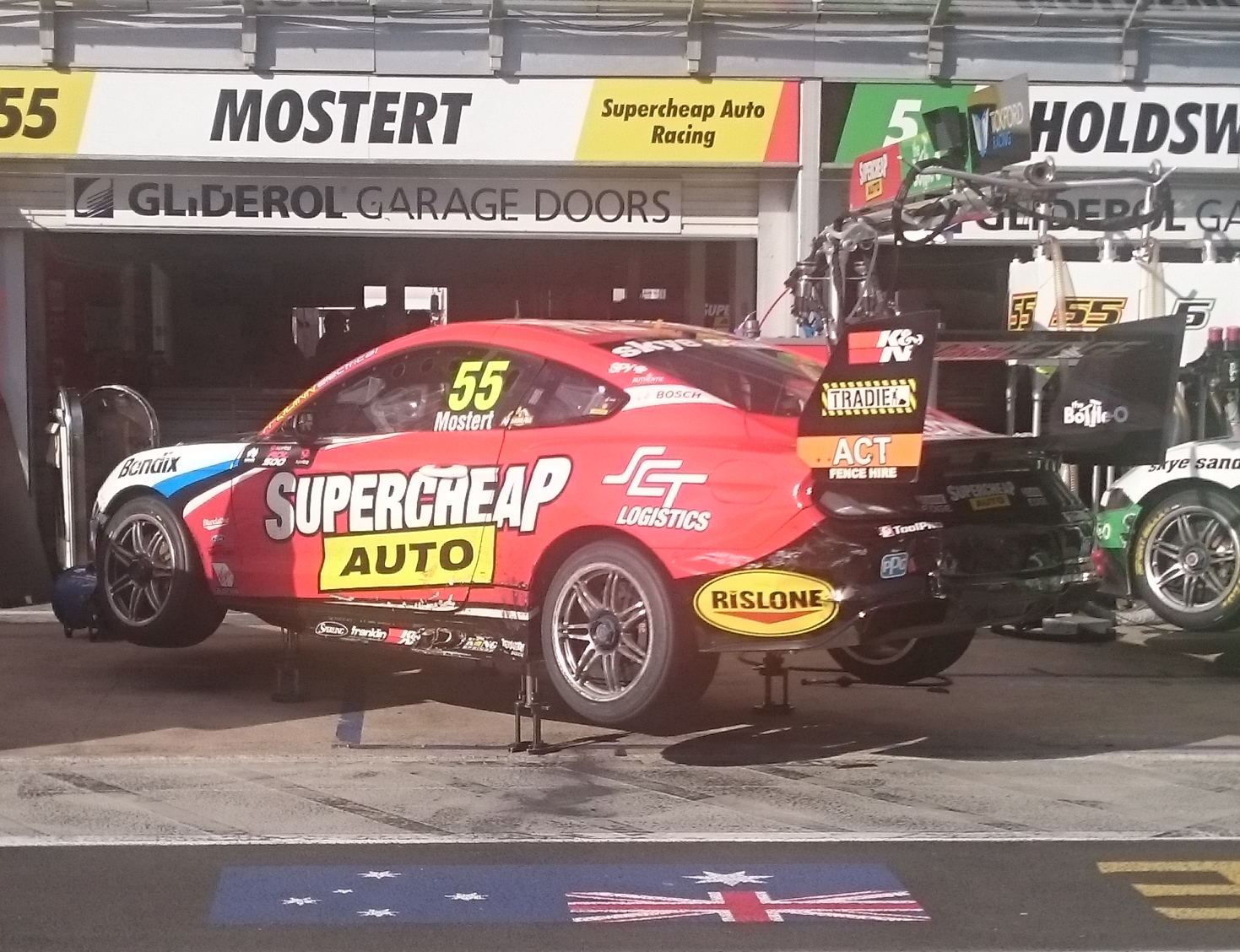
Chaz Mostert placed 15th in Race 2 driving a Ford Mustang GT for Tickford Racing

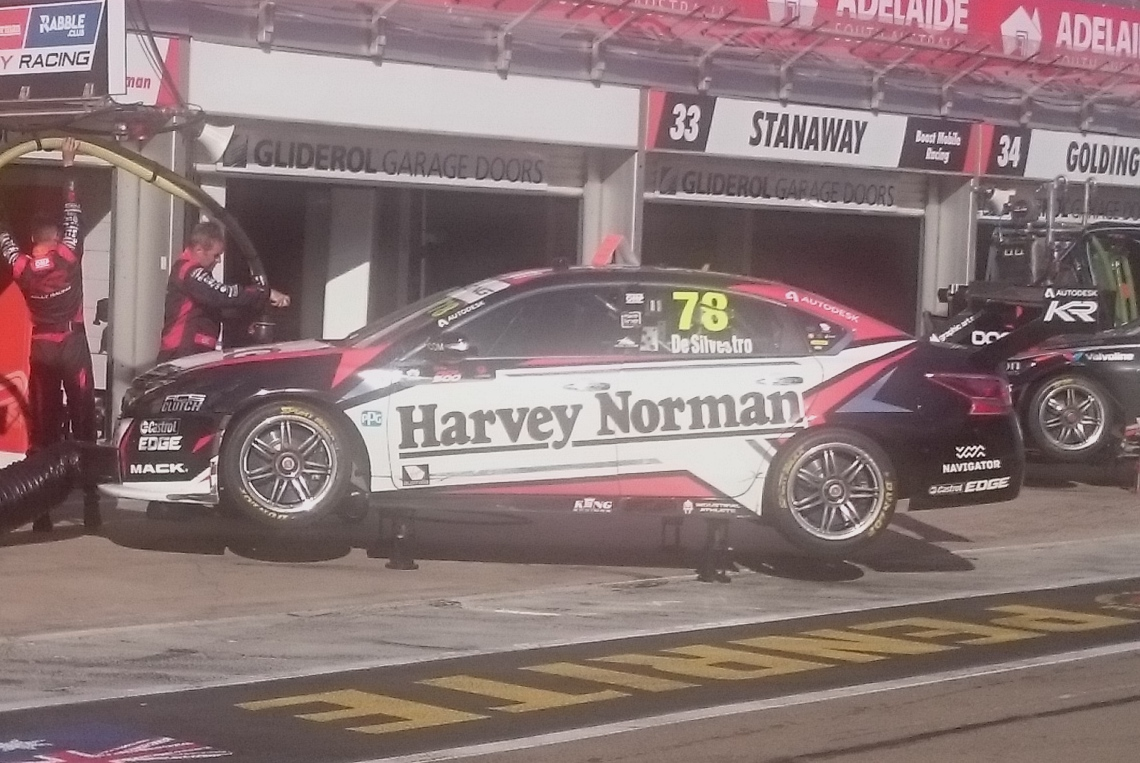
Simona de Silvestro placed 16th in Race 2 driving a Nissan Altima L33

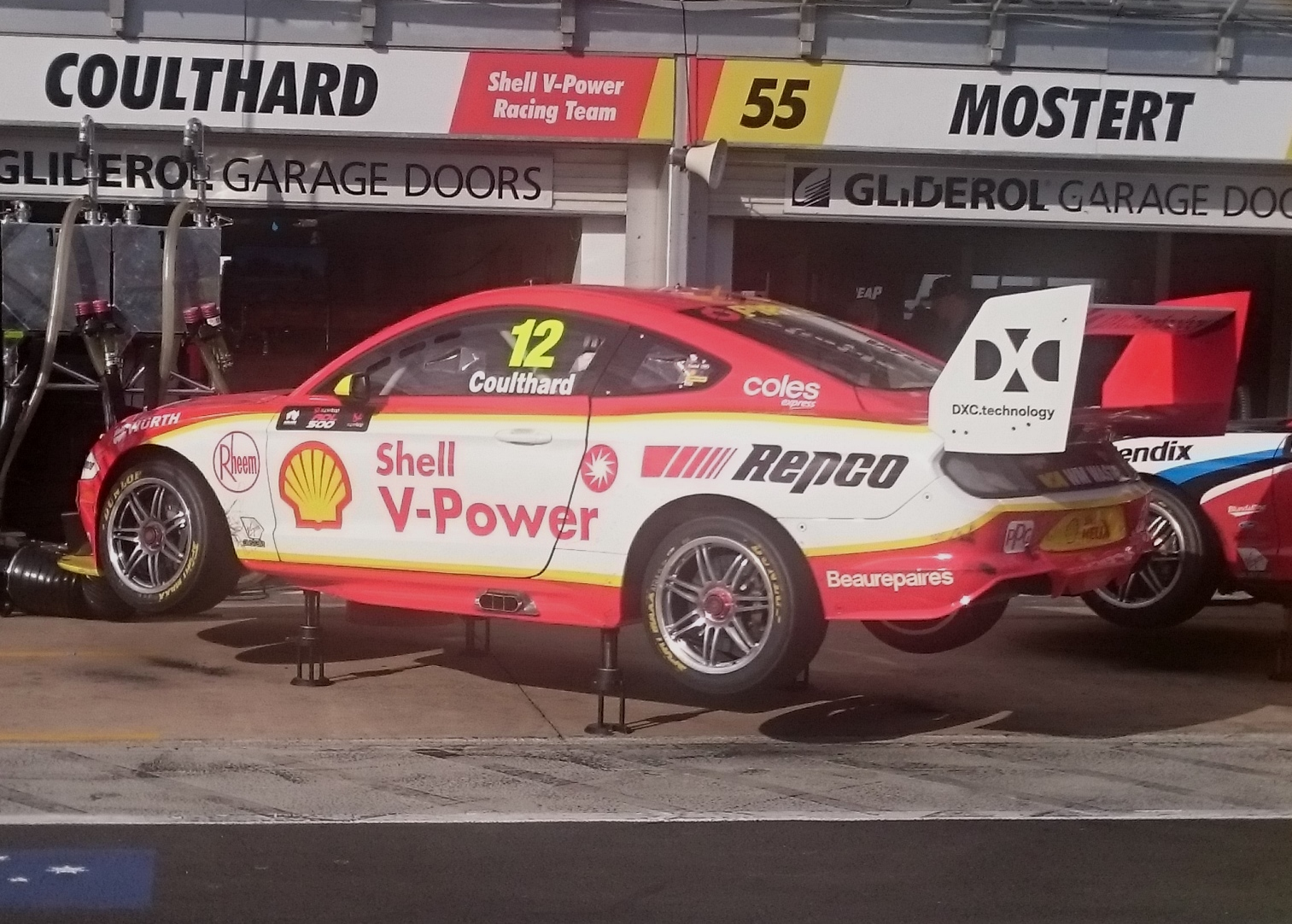
Fabian Coulthard placed 20th in Race 2 driving a Ford Mustang GT
