= Sydney 500 (Homebush Street Circuit) =

Australian car racing event (2009–2016)

(New South Wales) Sydney 500
- Race Information
Venue	Sydney Olympic Park Street Circuit
Number of times held	8
First held	2009
Last held	2016
- Race Format
- Race 1
Laps	74
Distance	250 km
- Race 2
Laps	74
Distance	250 km
- Last Event (2016)
- Overall Winner
(New Zealand) Shane van Gisbergen	Triple Eight Race Engineering
- Race Winners
(Australia) Jamie Whincup	Triple Eight Race Engineering
(New Zealand) Shane van Gisbergen	Triple Eight Race Engineering

The Sydney 500 was an annual motor racing event for Supercars, held at the Homebush Street Circuit in Sydney Olympic Park, New South Wales, Australia. The event was a regular part of the Supercars Championship from 2009 to 2016, being the final event on the calendar.

== Format ==
The event was staged over a three-day weekend, from Friday to Sunday. Two forty-minute practice sessions were held on Friday while Saturday featured one 20-minute qualifying session which decided the grid positions for the following 250 kilometre race. A twenty-minute qualifying session was held on Sunday, succeeded by a top ten shootout, the combined results of which decided the grid for the following 250 km race.

From 2009 to 2013, a single 250 km race was held on the Saturday. This was changed to two 125 km races in 2014 as part of the Super Street format introduced that year. In 2016, the event returned to the original 2 x 250 km format.

== History ==
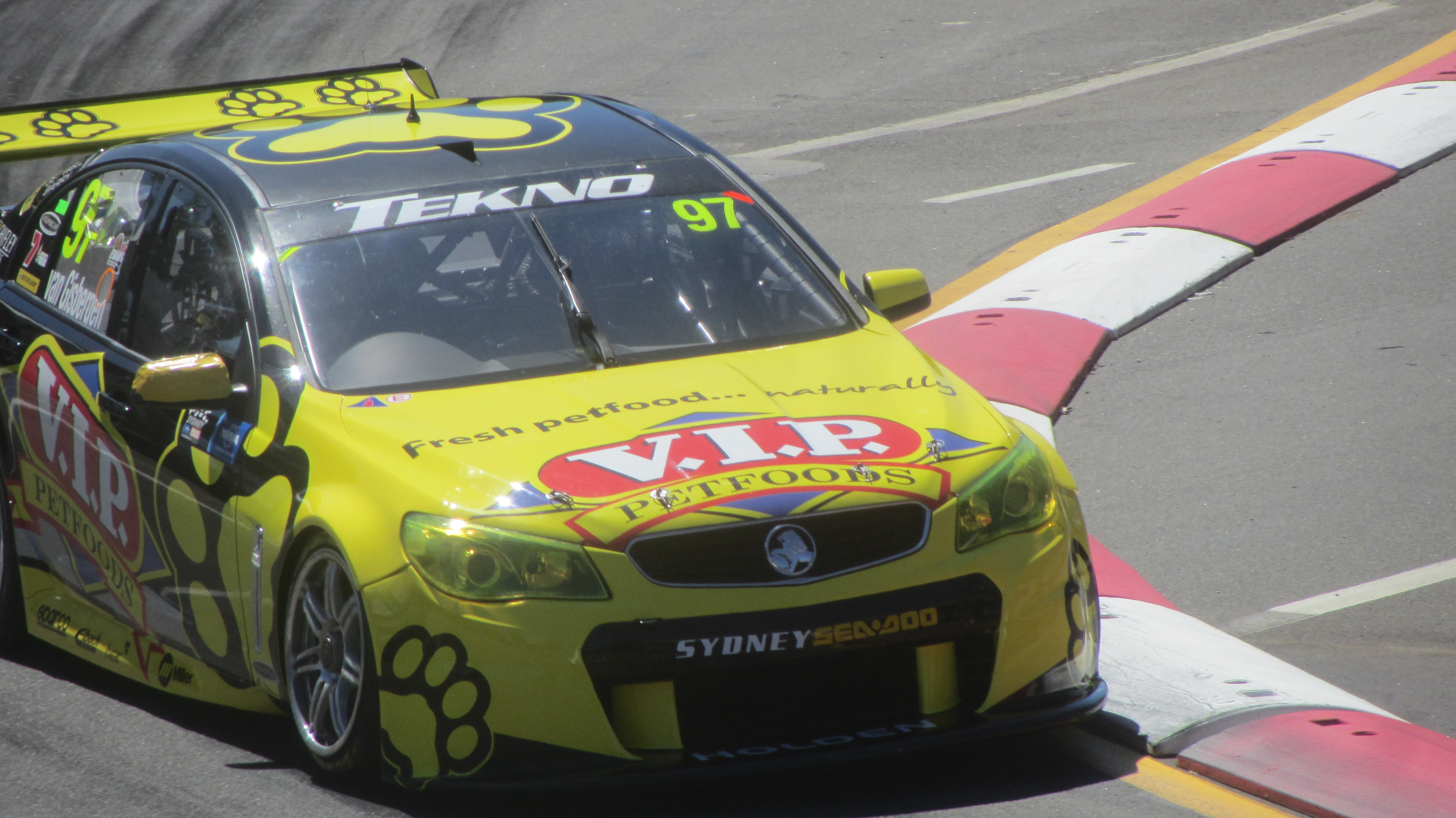
Shane van Gisbergen won his first of four races at the event in 2013.

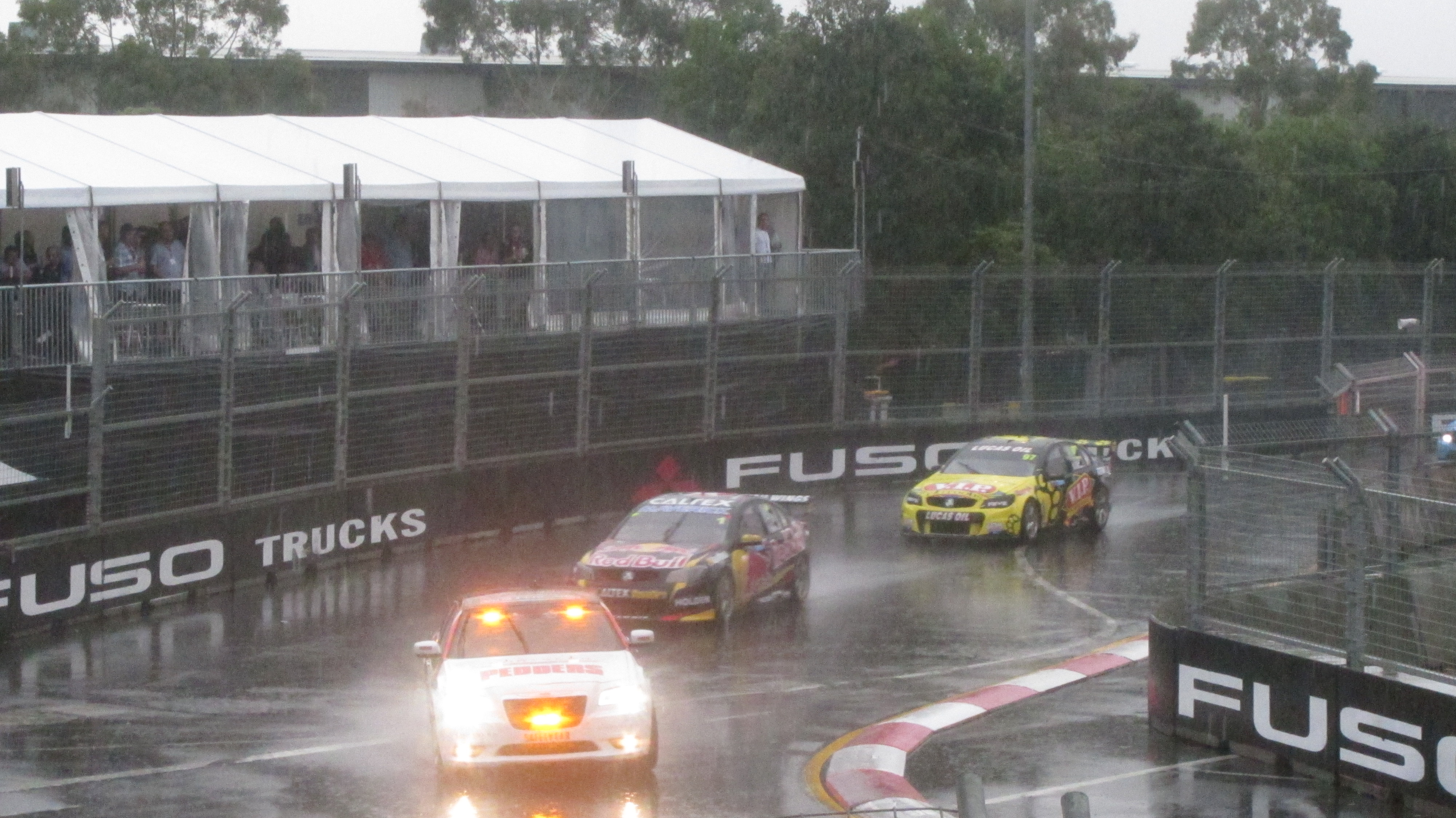
Thunderstorms disrupted the 2014 event.

Sydney had long hosted touring car events, however only at permanent circuits such as Sydney Motorsport Park and Oran Park Raceway. With Oran Park being demolished after 2008 for a housing redevelopment, and Sydney Motorsport Park failing to draw large crowds, the idea of building a street circuit at Sydney Olympic Park was devised by the state government and Supercars to create a new showpiece Sydney event. The Sydney 500, then sponsored by Telstra, was launched on 16 May 2009, at Martin Place in Sydney. The launch began with six V8 Supercars driving across the Sydney Harbour Bridge before the morning peak hour traffic.

The inaugural 2009 event saw Jamie Whincup wrap up his second V8 Supercars title in the Saturday race, though the race was won by Garth Tander, driving for the Holden Racing Team. The event drew a large crowd of almost 185,000 people across the weekend, and the use of a 'rock and race' format was credited with opening up Supercars to a new demographic in Sydney. The first year saw Australian rock band Cold Chisel reformed to perform on the Saturday night at ANZ Stadium, which is inside the boundaries of the track. With the then series chairman Tony Cochrane an experienced concert promoter, event concerts in future years included performances from Guns N' Roses, John Farnham and Hunters and Collectors amongst others. In later years, the concert aspect of the event was either reduced in stature or dropped completely.

One of the event's most notable incidents took place during the 2010 event. In the Saturday race, a sudden rain shower caught out the leading cars at turn 5, causing several cars, including race leader Mark Winterbottom and leading championship contenders Whincup and James Courtney, to hit the wall. As all three drivers had a mathematical chance of winning the championship, Courtney, Whincup and Winterbottom all limped their cars back to the pit lane for repairs. Jonathon Webb and his team Tekno Autosports took their maiden race wins, while Courtney was the only one of the championship contender to return to the track and be classified as a finisher, securing vital points that helped him seal the championship on Sunday. Whincup also returned to the track, but was unable to set a fast enough lap time to be classified.

In 2011, Whincup and Triple Eight Race Engineering teammate Craig Lowndes battled for the championship, with Whincup prevailing to score his third title despite crashing during the Saturday race. In 2012, Lowndes became the first driver to score multiple race victories at the event. Whincup took his first victory in 2013, winning the Saturday having never finished on the podium at Homebush previously. A third-place finish on Sunday saw Whincup score a record-equalling fifth title, with Lowndes again finishing runner-up.

In 2014, former series champion Marcos Ambrose made his return to Supercars after racing in NASCAR from 2006 to 2014. He drove a wildcard entry, the first entered in a sprint round of the championship, run by DJR Team Penske. Two of the three races that weekend, the second Saturday race and the Sunday race, were red flagged after torrential rain and thunderstorms hit the circuit. The 2015 event saw Mark Winterbottom claim his first Supercars title. The 2016 event, its final running, saw the event crown another new series champion, with Shane van Gisbergen recovering from a drive-through penalty to secure a podium finish in the Saturday race.

In its early years, the event was one of the most unpredictable on the calendar, with seven different winners in the first eight races. However, in the ten races that followed, only Whincup (six wins) and van Gisbergen (four wins) have won races. The event was also known for its high attrition rate and high chance of safety cars.

== Criticism ==
=== Government support ===
The New South Wales Government under Premier Nathan Rees was criticised for spending $30 million of taxpayers' money to subsidise the Sydney 500.

Critics said the event would cost the NSW government far more than the amount originally stated. The Olympic Park Authority said "it is clear that in all scenarios the current V8 Supercars Australia budget estimates are too low and/or incomplete." Government involvement in the races was opposed by the Premier's adviser on events, John O'Neill, as well as the government's infrastructure chief, David Richmond. Federal Labor MP, Laurie Ferguson, said that it's all about "News Limited and Channel Seven - they're trying to please them." News Limited, publisher of The Daily Telegraph, and the Seven Network, who were a sponsor and broadcaster of the event respectively, had lobbied the New South Wales Government for public funding of the Supercars event.

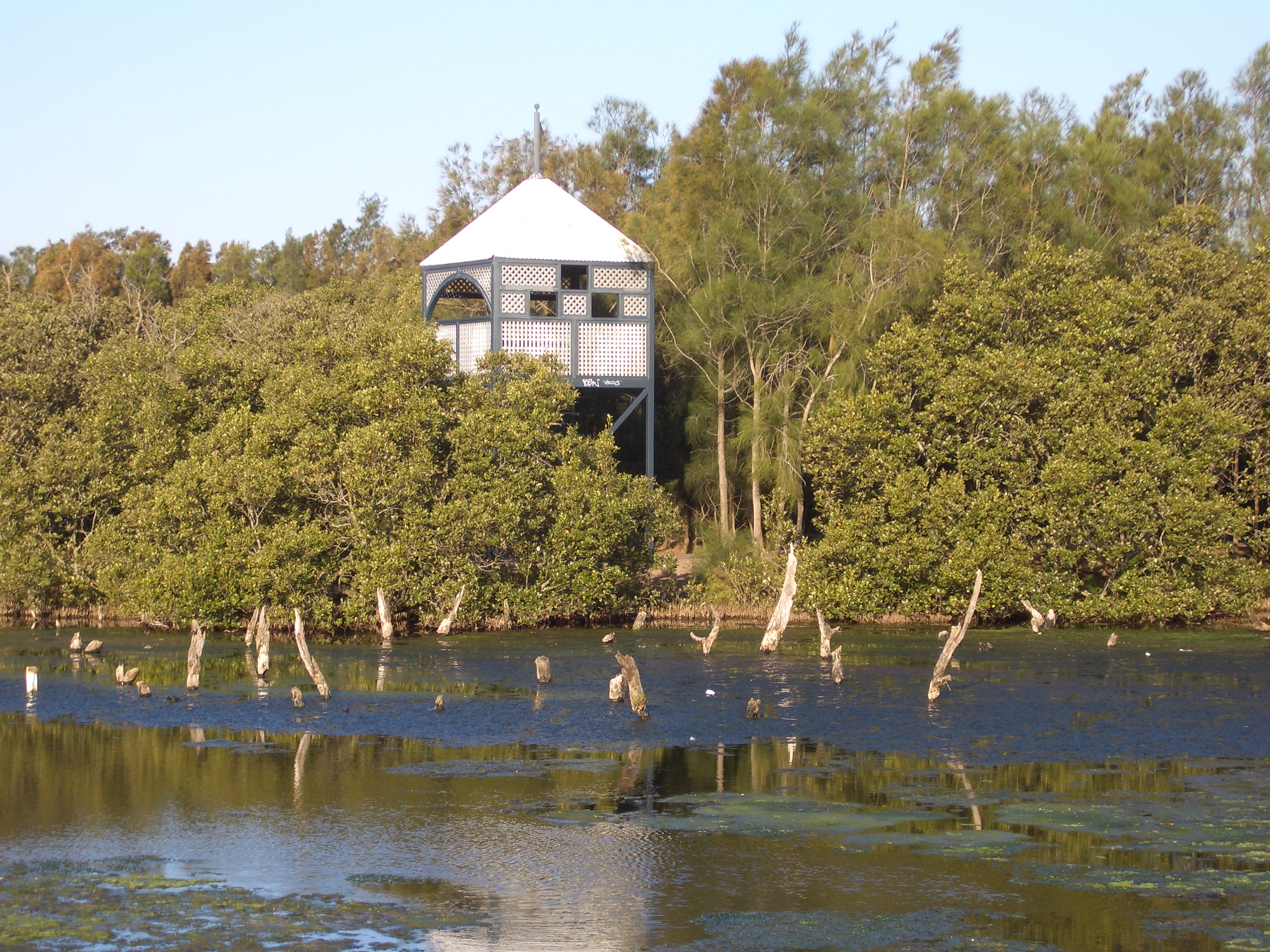
Wetlands at Sydney Olympic Park

Despite initial reports of success from event organisers, a report from the Auditor-General of New South Wales in 2010 supported the critics' claims. It concluded that the government failed to adequately estimate the costs of the event, and that the benefits of the event were not as high as expected. Despite the ongoing criticism, and a change of government, in 2013 the event was renewed until the end of 2016, with an option for the government to extend the deal for a further two years. The expected crowd inflows from interstate and overseas dropped from 15,000 in the original deal in 2009 to 5,000 for the new deal.

=== Environmental concerns ===
The conversion of part of the Sydney Olympic Park precinct into a street circuit was widely criticised by environmental groups. The Total Environment Centre said that the New South Wales Government overrode the threatened species law, as well as the Homebush Bay Authority's planning principals, and would cause social, environmental and economic disruption at Sydney Olympic Park.

== Demise ==
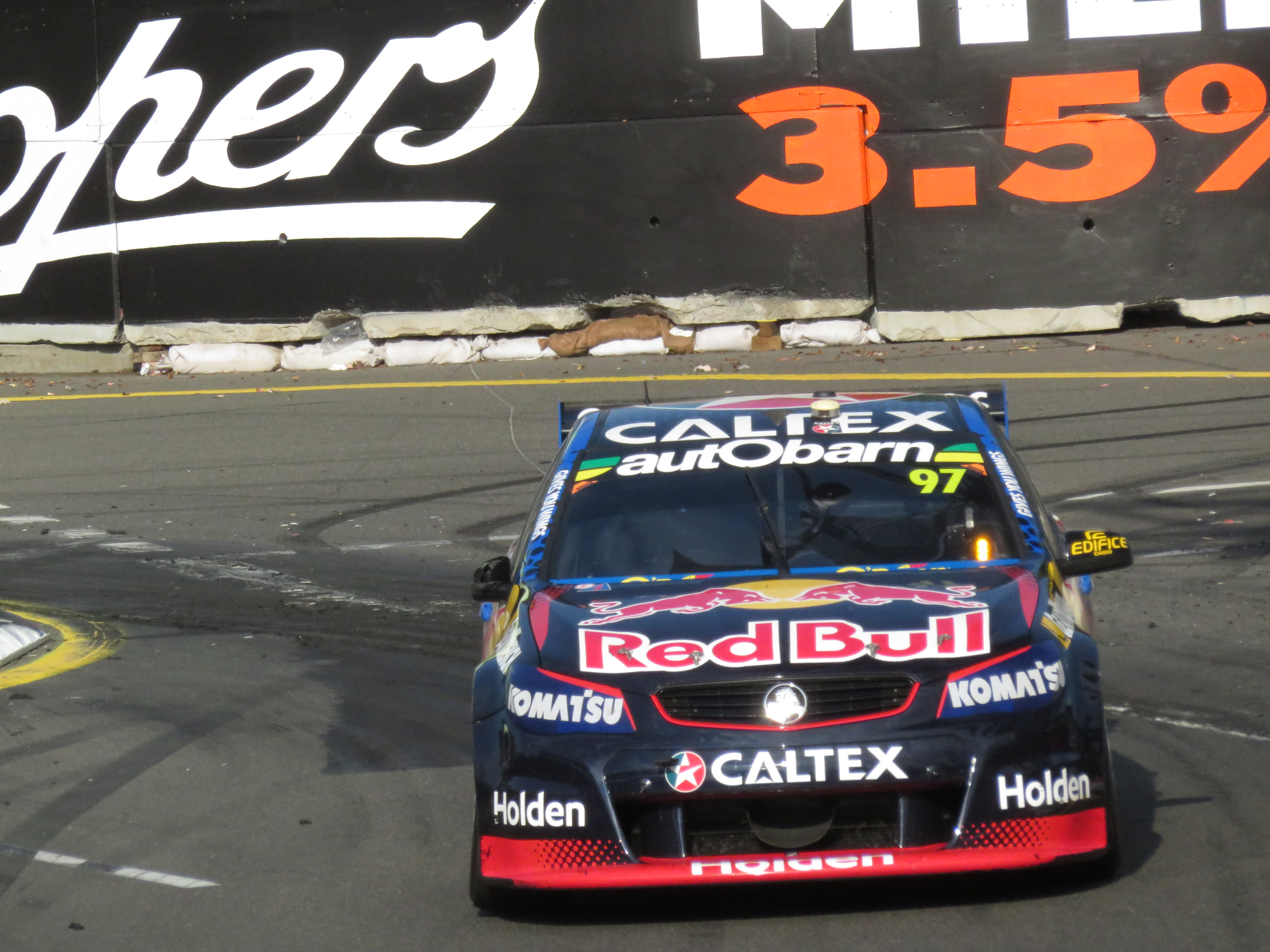
Shane van Gisbergen won the final race at the circuit in 2016.

In 2015, Supercars proposed to shorten the circuit to reduce the event's costs. This proposal failed, and in March 2016 it was announced that the ongoing costs of running the event would result in 2016 being the final running of the Sydney 500. Other options within New South Wales were then considered to replace the event, such as a street circuit being built in Gosford on the Central Coast. The Gosford plans fell through and in September 2016 the Premier of New South Wales, Mike Baird, announced the event would be replaced with the Newcastle 500, held on the Newcastle Street Circuit in Newcastle, around 160 km north of Sydney.

== Winners ==
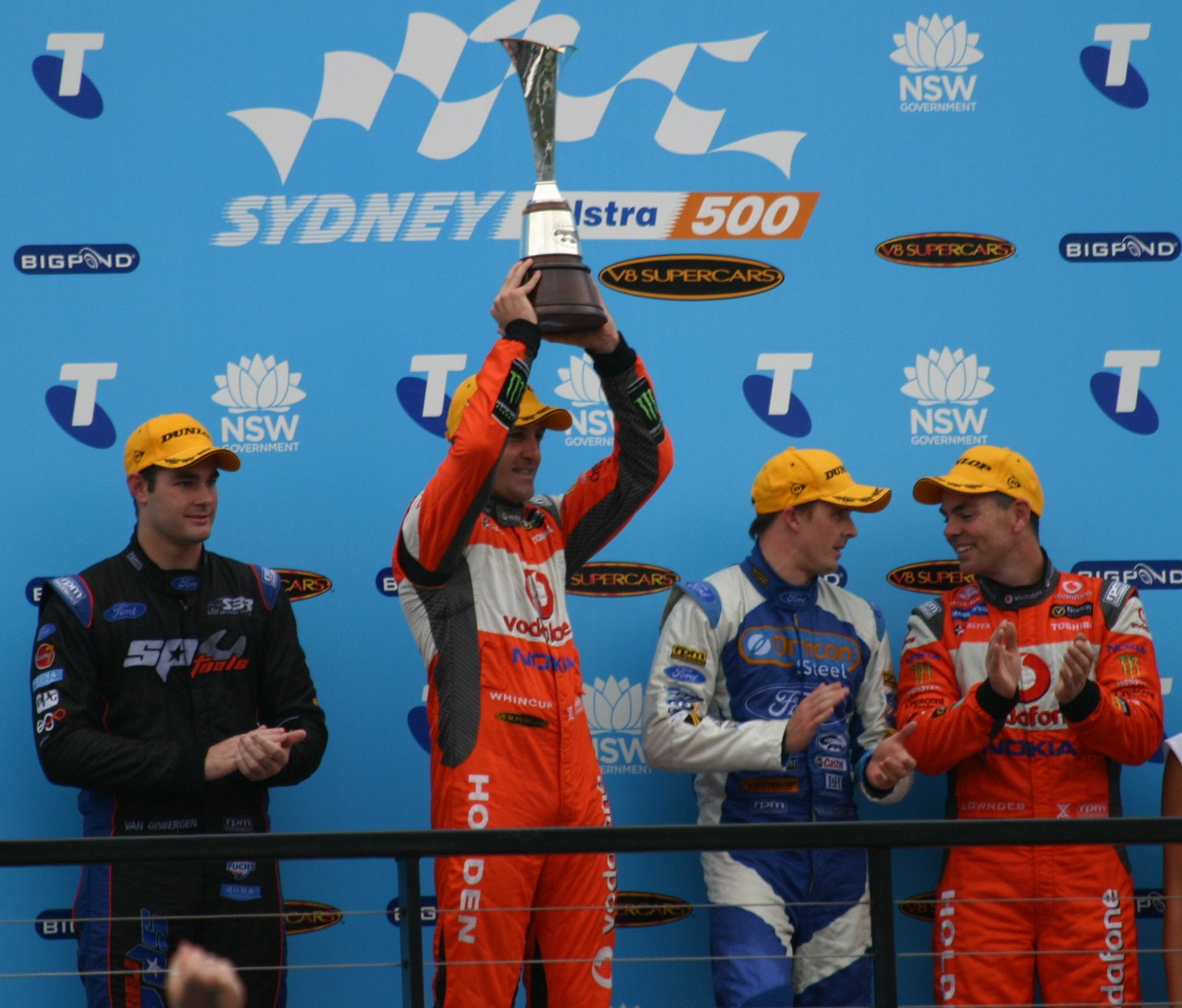
Jamie Whincup (holding trophy) celebrates his 2011 championship victory, while the podium finishers from the Sunday race watch on.

Year	Event title	Race	Driver	Team	Car
2009	Sydney Telstra 500	1	(Australia) Garth Tander	Holden Racing Team	Holden VE Commodore
2009	Sydney Telstra 500	2	(Australia) James Courtney	Dick Johnson Racing	Ford FG Falcon
2010	Sydney Telstra 500	1	(Australia) Jonathon Webb	Tekno Autosports	Ford FG Falcon
2010	Sydney Telstra 500	2	(Australia) Lee Holdsworth	Garry Rogers Motorsport	Holden VE Commodore
2011	Sydney Telstra 500	1	(Australia) Craig Lowndes	Triple Eight Race Engineering	Holden VE Commodore
2011	Sydney Telstra 500	2	(Australia) Mark Winterbottom	Ford Performance Racing	Ford FG Falcon
2012	Sydney Telstra 500	1	(Australia) Craig Lowndes	Triple Eight Race Engineering	Holden VE Commodore
2012	Sydney Telstra 500	2	(Australia) Will Davison	Ford Performance Racing	Ford FG Falcon
2013	Sydney NRMA Motoring & Services 500	1	(Australia) Jamie Whincup	Triple Eight Race Engineering	Holden VF Commodore
2013	Sydney NRMA Motoring & Services 500	2	(New Zealand) Shane van Gisbergen	Tekno Autosports	Holden VF Commodore
2014	Sydney NRMA 500	1	(Australia) Jamie Whincup	Triple Eight Race Engineering	Holden VF Commodore
2014	Sydney NRMA 500	2	(Australia) Jamie Whincup	Triple Eight Race Engineering	Holden VF Commodore
2014	Sydney NRMA 500	3	(New Zealand) Shane van Gisbergen	Tekno Autosports	Holden VF Commodore
2015	Coates Hire Sydney 500	1	(Australia) Jamie Whincup	Triple Eight Race Engineering	Holden VF Commodore
2015	Coates Hire Sydney 500	2	(Australia) Jamie Whincup	Triple Eight Race Engineering	Holden VF Commodore
2015	Coates Hire Sydney 500	3	(New Zealand) Shane van Gisbergen	Tekno Autosports	Holden VF Commodore
2016	Coates Hire Sydney 500	1	(Australia) Jamie Whincup	Triple Eight Race Engineering	Holden VF Commodore
2016	Coates Hire Sydney 500	2	(New Zealand) Shane van Gisbergen	Triple Eight Race Engineering	Holden VF Commodore

== Multiple winners ==
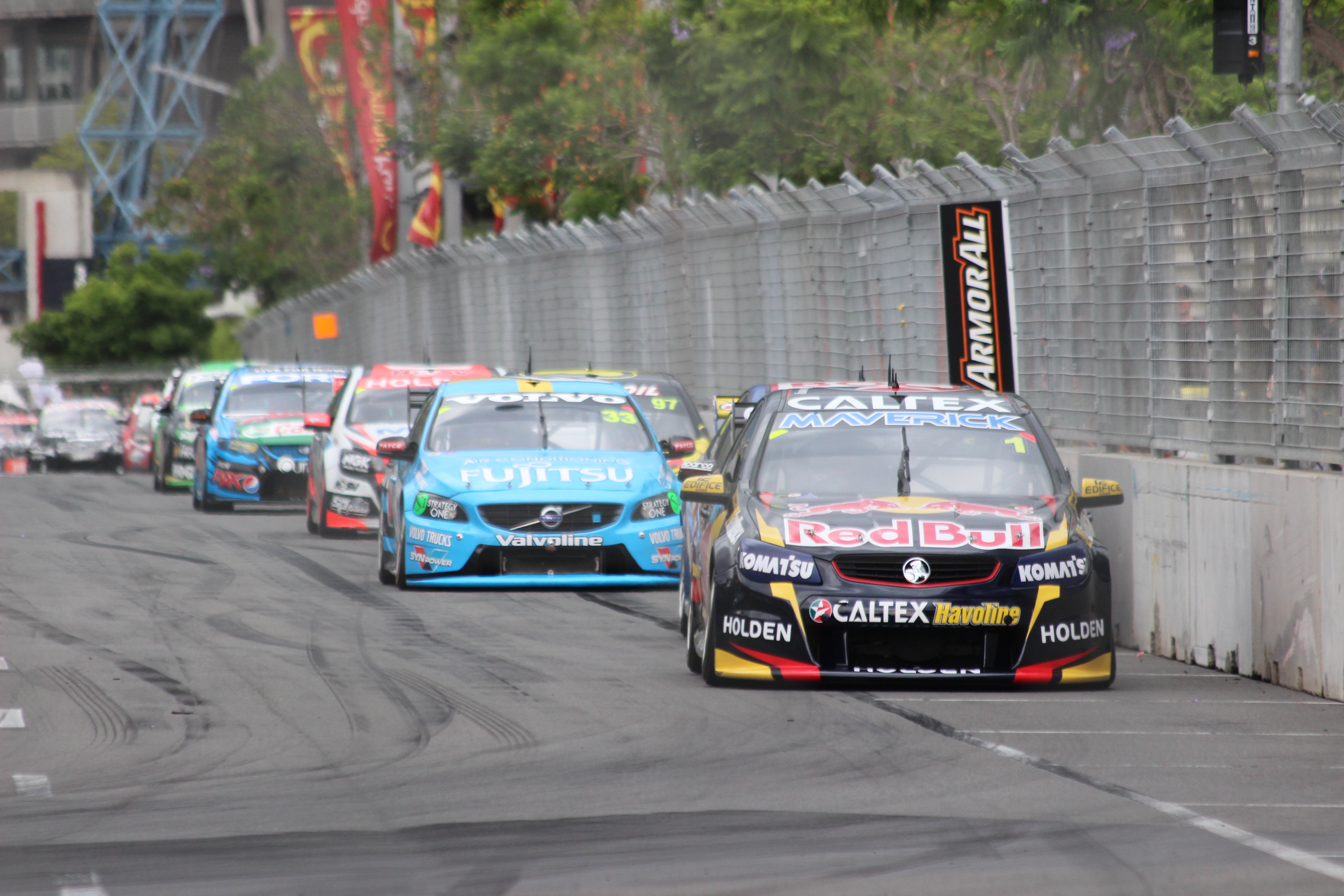
Jamie Whincup leads the field at the 2014 Sydney NRMA 500. He went on to win the race.

=== By driver ===
Race Wins	Driver
6	(Australia) Jamie Whincup
4	(New Zealand) Shane van Gisbergen
2	(Australia) Craig Lowndes

=== By team ===
Race Wins	Team
9	Triple Eight Race Engineering
4	Tekno Autosports
2	Ford Performance Racing

=== By manufacturer ===
Race Wins	Manufacturer
14	Holden
4	Ford

== Event sponsors ==
- 2009–12: Telstra
- 2013–14: NRMA
- 2015–16: Coates Hire

== See also ==
- List of Australian Touring Car Championship races
