= 2009 Sydney 500 =

2009 Supercar Championship event

(New South Wales) 2009 Sydney Telstra 500
Event Information
- Round 14 of 14 in the 2009 V8 Supercar Championship Series
- Date: 4–6 December 2009
- Location: Sydney, New South Wales
- Venue: Homebush Street Circuit
- Weather: Fine

Results
Race 1
Distance	74 laps	250 km
Pole position	Garth Tander; Holden Racing Team	1:29.8489
Winner	Garth Tander; Holden Racing Team	2:05:49.8020
Race 2
Distance	74 laps	250 km
Pole position	Lee Holdsworth; Garry Rogers Motorsport	1:29.3047
Winner	James Courtney; Dick Johnson Racing	2:08:16.0105

The 2009 Sydney 500 (known for naming rights reasons as the 2009 Sydney Telstra 500) was the fourteenth and final round of the 2009 V8 Supercar Championship Series. It was the first V8 Supercar event to be held on the Homebush Street Circuit and was held on the weekend of 4 to 6 December in Sydney, New South Wales.

Garth Tander of the Holden Racing Team claimed pole position for the first race and won ahead of Mark Winterbottom and Jason Bright. The second race saw Lee Holdsworth claim pole position while James Courtney won the race later that day. Jamie Whincup also secured his second V8 Supercar championship on the first race of the weekend, with his fifth-placing having secured him enough points even before the last race had been run.

This event also marked the final race for Cameron McConville who announced his retirement in November. Until returning to the brand in 2026, this was Triple Eight Race Engineering's last race with Ford before defecting to Holden for 2010.

== Background ==
The event was held on the weekend of 4 to 6 December 2009. It was the first V8 Supercar event to be held on the Homebush Street Circuit, and consisted of two 250 kilometer races.

=== Entry list ===
There were 29 drivers entered into this event. 18 drivers would compete in a VE Holden Commodore while ten drivers would utilise the FG Ford Falcon and one, Michael Patrizi of Paul Cruickshank Racing, would remain with the BF Ford Falcon.

=== Support categories ===
Category	Races	Round winner
Fujitsu V8 Supercar Series	3	(Australia) Jonathon Webb (Ford Falcon (BF))
Australian V8 Ute Racing Series	3	(Australia) George Miedecke (Ford Falcon BA Ute)
Australian Mini Challenge	3	(Australia) Glenn Seton (MINI Cooper S JCWR56)
Australian GT Championship	3	(Australia) Max Twigg (Porsche GT3 997 Cup)

== Race results ==
=== Race 25 ===
==== Qualifying ====
Pos	No	Name	Team	Vehicle	Time
1	2	(Australia) Garth Tander	Holden Racing Team	Holden Commodore (VE)	1:29.5840
2	24	(Australia) David Reynolds	Walkinshaw Racing	Holden Commodore (VE)	1:29.6478
3	18	(Australia) James Courtney	Dick Johnson Racing	Ford Falcon (FG)	1:29.7457
4	33	(Australia) Lee Holdsworth	Garry Rogers Motorsport	Holden Commodore (VE)	1:29.7802
5	10	(Australia) Paul Dumbrell	Walkinshaw Racing	Holden Commodore (VE)	1:29.7807
6	5	(Australia) Mark Winterbottom	Ford Performance Racing	Ford Falcon (FG)	1:29.8795
7	34	(Australia) Michael Caruso	Garry Rogers Motorsport	Holden Commodore (VE)	1:29.9817
8	51	(New Zealand) Greg Murphy	Tasman Motorsport	Holden Commodore (VE)	1:30.0011
9	1	(Australia) Jamie Whincup	Triple Eight Race Engineering	Ford Falcon (FG)	1:30.0413
10	14	(Australia) Cameron McConville	Brad Jones Racing	Holden Commodore (VE)	1:30.0555
11	15	(Australia) Rick Kelly	Kelly Racing	Holden Commodore (VE)	1:30.0583
12	39	(Australia) Russell Ingall	Paul Morris Motorsport	Holden Commodore (VE)	1:30.1824
13	25	(Australia) Jason Bright	Britek Motorsport	Ford Falcon (FG)	1:30.1841
14	7	(Australia) Todd Kelly	Kelly Racing	Holden Commodore (VE)	1:30.1967
15	9	(New Zealand) Shane van Gisbergen	Stone Brothers Racing	Ford Falcon (FG)	1:30.2261
16	17	(Australia) Steven Johnson	Dick Johnson Racing	Ford Falcon (FG)	1:30.3236
17	22	(Australia) Will Davison	Holden Racing Team	Holden Commodore (VE)	1:30.5986
18	111	(New Zealand) Fabian Coulthard	Paul Cruickshank Racing	Ford Falcon (FG)	1:30.6254
19	67	(Australia) Tim Slade	Paul Morris Motorsport	Holden Commodore (VE)	1:30.6369
20	55	(Australia) Tony D'Alberto	Rod Nash Racing	Holden Commodore (VE)	no time
21	888	(Australia) Craig Lowndes	Triple Eight Race Engineering	Ford Falcon (FG)	1:30.7873
22	6	(New Zealand) Steven Richards	Ford Performance Racing	Ford Falcon (FG)	1:31.1049
23	4	(Australia) Alex Davison	Stone Brothers Racing	Ford Falcon (FG)	1:31.1968
24	8	(New Zealand) Jason Richards	Brad Jones Racing	Holden Commodore (VE)	1:31.2101
25	333	(Australia) Michael Patrizi	Paul Cruickshank Racing	Ford Falcon (BF)	1:31.2781
26	11	(Australia) Jack Perkins	Kelly Racing	Holden Commodore (VE)	1:31.3646
27	12	(Australia) Dean Fiore	Triple F Racing	Holden Commodore (VE)	1:31.9459
28	16	(Australia) Mark McNally	Kelly Racing	Holden Commodore (VE)	1:32.6307
EXC	3	(Australia) Jason Bargwanna	Tasman Motorsport	Holden Commodore (VE)	excluded

==== Top ten shootout ====
Pos	No	Name	Team	Vehicle	Time
1	2	(Australia) Garth Tander	Holden Racing Team	Holden Commodore (VE)	1:29.8489
2	33	(Australia) Lee Holdsworth	Garry Rogers Motorsport	Holden Commodore (VE)	1:30.3376
3	1	(Australia) Jamie Whincup	Triple Eight Race Engineering	Holden Commodore (VE)	1:30.3631
4	34	(Australia) Michael Caruso	Garry Rogers Motorsport	Holden Commodore (VE)	1:30.3938
5	14	(Australia) Cameron McConville	Brad Jones Racing	Holden Commodore (VE)	1:30.4007
6	51	(New Zealand) Greg Murphy	Tasman Motorsport	Holden Commodore (VE)	1:30.4018
7	5	(Australia) Mark Winterbottom	Ford Performance Racing	Ford Falcon (FG)	1:30.4168
8	18	(Australia) James Courtney	Dick Johnson Racing	Ford Falcon (FG)	1:30.5638
9	24	(Australia) David Reynolds	Walkinshaw Racing	Holden Commodore (VE)	1:30.6887
10	10	(Australia) Paul Dumbrell	Walkinshaw Racing	Holden Commodore (VE)	1:30.8739

==== Race ====
Garth Tander led early with Lee Holdsworth in pursuit. Buried in the grid, Craig Lowndes was the first to pit when the pit window opened. David Reynolds damaged his car in the early running. On lap 10 Michael Patrizi crashed into the wall with no brakes, bringing out the safety car. Tander lost the lead in the pits, then as Holdsworth pulled away, Whincup took second from Tander as well. Fighting over fourth position, Cameron McConville and Greg Murphy made contact in pitlane, as Murphy was released from his pitbay into McConville's path. Murphy was later black flagged for the incident. Both Holden Racing Team Commodores were slowing, affecting Will Davison's chances of keeping the championship alive, and affecting Tander's ability to match pace with Holdsworth and Whincup.

Lap 24 saw Alex Davison pitting with suspension damage after having clouted the wall earlier in the race. Lap 26 saw Paul Dumbrell dive up the inside of Jack Perkins and made contact with Dean Fiore in front of Perkins sending both cars into a spin. The two cars cleared the chicane with Fiore stopping soon afterwards and Dumbrell exiting on the inside of the chicane. Immediately afterwards race leader Lee Holdsworth slid into the wall on the outside of the middle part of the chicane having found no traction after hitting a portion of the track compromised by fluid dropped by Fiore. At the safety car restart Whincup overshot a corner, allowing Tander back into the race lead.

On lap 39 Will Davison made a big dive up the inside of Craig Lowndes at the first turn but dived in too deep with a locked tyre and hit Lowndes, deranging Lowndes steering. Davison continued with a bent steering arm while Lowndes had more severe damage. Davison was later given a black flag penalty. Lap 43 Cameron McConville hit the wall having freshly stopped for tyres damaging the front right corner of the car. Shane van Gisbergen briefly nosed into the wall behind McConville. Lap 47 saw Russell Ingall dive into a wall. Murphy received contact from Jack Perkins, spinning Murphy's car into a tyre barrier. James Courtney received a mechanical black flag as his right side front door started flapping open. Courtney was forced to pit to address the flapping door. The problem was not fixed correctly and Courtney was forced to make a second stop. Steven Johnson hit the wall on lap 57 with Jack Perkins also making contact two laps later.

Pos	No	Name	Team	Vehicle	Laps	Time/Retired	Grid	Points
1	2	(Australia) Garth Tander	Holden Racing Team	Holden Commodore (VE)	74	02:05:49.8020	1	150
2	5	(Australia) Mark Winterbottom	Ford Performance Racing	Ford Falcon (FG)	74	+2.8s	7	138
3	25	(Australia) Jason Bright	Britek Motorsport	Ford Falcon (FG)	74	+8.1s	13	129
4	33	(Australia) Lee Holdsworth	Garry Rogers Motorsport	Holden Commodore (VE)	74	+8.5s	2	120
5	1	(Australia) Jamie Whincup	Triple Eight Race Engineering	Holden Commodore (VE)	74	+10.7s	3	111
6	34	(Australia) Michael Caruso	Garry Rogers Motorsport	Holden Commodore (VE)	74	+18.7s	4	102
7	3	(Australia) Jason Bargwanna	Tasman Motorsport	Holden Commodore (VE)	74	+20.5s	29	96
8	6	(New Zealand) Steven Richards	Ford Performance Racing	Ford Falcon (FG)	74	+20.8s	22	90
9	15	(Australia) Rick Kelly	Kelly Racing	Holden Commodore (VE)	74	+21.3s	11	84
10	9	(New Zealand) Shane van Gisbergen	Stone Brothers Racing	Ford Falcon (FG)	74	+31.2s	15	78
11	55	(Australia) Tony D'Alberto	Rod Nash Racing	Holden Commodore (VE)	74	+33.8s	20	72
12	8	(New Zealand) Jason Richards	Brad Jones Racing	Holden Commodore (VE)	74	+35.0s	24	69
13	111	(New Zealand) Fabian Coulthard	Paul Cruickshank Racing	Ford Falcon (FG)	74	+36.4s	18	66
14	7	(Australia) Todd Kelly	Kelly Racing	Holden Commodore (VE)	74	+49.8s	14	63
15	22	(Australia) Will Davison	Holden Racing Team	Holden Commodore (VE)	74	+1:03.2s	17	60
16	39	(Australia) Russell Ingall	Paul Morris Motorsport	Holden Commodore (VE)	74	+1:24.1s	12	57
17	18	(Australia) James Courtney	Dick Johnson Racing	Ford Falcon (FG)	73	+ 1 lap	8	54
18	24	(Australia) David Reynolds	Walkinshaw Racing	Holden Commodore (VE)	73	+ 1 lap	9	51
19	888	(Australia) Craig Lowndes	Triple Eight Race Engineering	Ford Falcon (FG)	57	+ 17 laps	21	48
20	4	(Australia) Alex Davison	Stone Brothers Racing	Ford Falcon (FG)	56	+ 18 laps	23	45
Ret	67	(Australia) Tim Slade	Paul Morris Motorsport	Holden Commodore (VE)	71	Retired	19	
Ret	11	(Australia) Jack Perkins	Kelly Racing	Holden Commodore (VE)	58	Retired	26	
Ret	17	(Australia) Steven Johnson	Dick Johnson Racing	Ford Falcon (FG)	57	Retired	16	
Ret	51	(New Zealand) Greg Murphy	Tasman Motorsport	Holden Commodore (VE)	48	Retired	6	
Ret	14	(Australia) Cameron McConville	Brad Jones Racing	Holden Commodore (VE)	41	Retired	5	
Ret	12	(Australia) Dean Fiore	Triple F Racing	Holden Commodore (VE)	24	Retired	27	
Ret	10	(Australia) Paul Dumbrell	Walkinshaw Racing	Holden Commodore (VE)	24	Retired	10	
Ret	333	(Australia) Michael Patrizi	Paul Cruickshank Racing	Ford Falcon (BF)	9	Retired	25	
Ret	16	(Australia) Mark McNally	Kelly Racing	Holden Commodore (VE)	2	Retired	28	
Fastest lap: Lee Holdsworth (Garry Rogers Motorsport), 1:30.8818

=== Race 26 ===
==== Qualifying ====
Pos	No	Name	Team	Car	Time
1	33	(Australia) Lee Holdsworth	Garry Rogers Motorsport	Holden VE Commodore	1:29.3047
2	18	(Australia) James Courtney	Dick Johnson Racing	Ford FG Falcon	1:29.4040
3	15	(Australia) Rick Kelly	Kelly Racing	Holden VE Commodore	1:29.4306
4	5	(Australia) Mark Winterbottom	Ford Performance Racing	Ford FG Falcon	1:29.4418
5	51	(New Zealand) Greg Murphy	Tasman Motorsport	Holden VE Commodore	1:29.5560
6	34	(Australia) Michael Caruso	Garry Rogers Motorsport	Holden VE Commodore	1:29.6110
7	2	(Australia) Garth Tander	Holden Racing Team	Holden VE Commodore	1:29.6169
8	25	(Australia) Jason Bright	Britek Motorsport	Ford FG Falcon	1:29.6476
9	888	(Australia) Craig Lowndes	Triple Eight Race Engineering	Ford FG Falcon	1:29.7319
10	24	(Australia) David Reynolds	Walkinshaw Racing	Holden VE Commodore	1:29.7327
11	3	(Australia) Jason Bargwanna	Tasman Motorsport	Holden VE Commodore	1:29.8377
12	10	(Australia) Paul Dumbrell	Walkinshaw Racing	Holden VE Commodore	1:29.8571
13	22	(Australia) Will Davison	Holden Racing Team	Holden VE Commodore	1:29.9280
14	14	(Australia) Cameron McConville	Brad Jones Racing	Holden VE Commodore	1:29.9594
15	8	(New Zealand) Jason Richards	Brad Jones Racing	Holden VE Commodore	1:30.0267
16	4	(Australia) Alex Davison	Stone Brothers Racing	Ford FG Falcon	1:30.1068
17	55	(Australia) Tony D'Alberto	Rod Nash Racing	Holden VE Commodore	1:30.1386
18	67	(Australia) Tim Slade	Paul Morris Motorsport	Holden VE Commodore	1:30.1406
19	9	(New Zealand) Shane van Gisbergen	Stone Brothers Racing	Ford FG Falcon	1:30.1529
20	111	(New Zealand) Fabian Coulthard	Paul Cruickshank Racing	Ford FG Falcon	1:30.2231
21	39	(Australia) Russell Ingall	Paul Morris Motorsport	Holden VE Commodore	1:30.2402
22	6	(New Zealand) Steven Richards	Ford Performance Racing	Ford FG Falcon	1:30.3826
23	333	(Australia) Michael Patrizi	Paul Cruickshank Racing	Ford BF Falcon	1:30.5275
24	17	(Australia) Steven Johnson	Dick Johnson Racing	Ford FG Falcon	1:30.5706
25	7	(Australia) Todd Kelly	Kelly Racing	Holden VE Commodore	1:30.6933
26	1	(Australia) Jamie Whincup	Triple Eight Race Engineering	Ford FG Falcon	1:30.9750
27	12	(Australia) Dean Fiore	Triple F Racing	Holden VE Commodore	1:31.0067
28	11	(Australia) Jack Perkins	Kelly Racing	Holden VE Commodore	1:31.1191
29	16	(Australia) Mark McNally	Kelly Racing	Holden VE Commodore	1:34.3783

==== Race ====
Holdsworth led away from pole position, only to lose it to James Courtney on the second lap. Rick Kelly also passed Holdsworth. Winterbottom slotted into fourth ahead of Jason Bright and Michael Caruso. Steven Richards was first to pit with damage after contact with Shane van Gisbergen sent Richards into the wall, damaging the right side of the car. Rick Kelly briefly brushed the wall exiting turn 8 and lost four race positions, dropping behind Holdsworth, Winterbottom, Bright and Greg Murphy.

Lap 14 saw Rick Kelly hit turn eight even harder, this time deranging the front right corner of the car, effectively putting him out of the race. Two laps later, Todd Kelly, having just made his first pit-stop, under-steered into the same barrier as his brother, with much lighter damage. Lap 21 saw Mark Winterbottom have an off and drop to 18th place. Holdsworth stayed out on a long stint. The stint came to an end when Holdsworth understeered off at turn 8, damaging the front right corner and cutting a brake line. Michael Patrizi crashed lightly into the same barrier and continued. Holdsworth was unable to make it back to the pits and a safety car was called for although Holdsworth pulled up off the course.

At the restart Greg Murphy understeered off the track at the first turn in a self-inflicted mistake, backing the car into the wall and popping out the rear windscreen, handing second position to the charging Craig Lowndes. Whincup pitted at the end of lap 37 then on his outlap Whincup nosed into the wall at turn 8. Jason Bargwanna also hit the wall but continued. Most of the front runners pitted immediately, with Craig Lowndes striking Alex Davison leaving pitlane, subsequently leaving pitlane. Courtney missed the pitstop and had to pit the following lap but retained the race lead.

At the restart, Jason Bright leapt out of turn 8 to blast past James Courtney to take the lead. Bright also received a drive through penalty as well, again for contact in the pitlane, an 'unsafe release'. That handed the lead back to James Courtney with Michael Caruso pressing hard. An accident for Mark McNally triggered the fourth safety car period, with the race restarting on lap 54 with Courtney leading Caruso, Winterbottom, Ingall and Fabian Coulthard. Cameron McConville, Jason Bright and Craig Lowndes (sucked into Bright's accident) all brushed walls on the restart lap. Lowndes and McConville retired. Todd Kelly began dropping down field with battery or alternator problems.

Lap 60 saw Winterbottom brush the wall exiting the rapidly infamous turn 8, peeling off the door skin on the right side of the car. Winterbottom kept in third place, tucked into a six car train, ending in a position battled between Shane van Gisbergen and Greg Murphy.

Race 26 classification
Pos	No	Name	Team	Vehicle	Laps	Time/Retired	Grid
1	18	(Australia) James Courtney	Dick Johnson Racing	Ford Falcon (FG)	74	02:08:16.0105	2
2	34	(Australia) Michael Caruso	Garry Rogers Motorsport	Holden Commodore (VE)	74	+ 3.909 s	6
3	5	(Australia) Mark Winterbottom	Ford Performance Racing	Ford Falcon (FG)	74	+ 10.687 s	4
4	39	(Australia) Russell Ingall	Paul Morris Motorsport	Holden Commodore (VE)	74	+ 13.278 s	21
5	111	(New Zealand) Fabian Coulthard	Paul Cruickshank Racing	Ford Falcon (FG)	74	+ 14.960 s	20
6	9	(New Zealand) Shane van Gisbergen	Stone Brothers Racing	Ford Falcon (FG)	74	+ 20.769 s	19
7	51	(New Zealand) Greg Murphy	Tasman Motorsport	Holden Commodore (VE)	74	+ 25.904 s	5
8	22	(Australia) Will Davison	Holden Racing Team	Holden Commodore (VE)	74	+ 32.847 s	13
9	4	(Australia) Alex Davison	Stone Brothers Racing	Ford Falcon (FG)	74	+ 42.832 s	16
10	17	(Australia) Steven Johnson	Dick Johnson Racing	Ford Falcon (FG)	74	+ 1:13.120 s	24
11	24	(Australia) David Reynolds	Walkinshaw Racing	Holden Commodore (VE)	73	+ 1 lap	10
12	333	(Australia) Michael Patrizi	Paul Cruickshank Racing	Ford Falcon (BF)	73	+ 1 lap	23
13	10	(Australia) Paul Dumbrell	Walkinshaw Racing	Holden Commodore (VE)	72	+ 2 laps	12
14	1	(Australia) Jamie Whincup	Triple Eight Race Engineering	Ford Falcon (FG)	70	+ 4 laps	26
15	6	(New Zealand) Steven Richards	Ford Performance Racing	Ford Falcon (FG)	67	+ 7 laps	22
16	67	(Australia) Tim Slade	Paul Morris Motorsport	Holden Commodore (VE)	64	+ 10 laps	18
Ret	7	(Australia) Todd Kelly	Kelly Racing	Holden Commodore (VE)	57	Retired	25
Ret	55	(Australia) Tony D'Alberto	Rod Nash Racing	Holden Commodore (VE)	56	Retired	17
Ret	25	(Australia) Jason Bright	Britek Motorsport	Ford Falcon (FG)	55	Retired	8
Ret	888	(Australia) Craig Lowndes	Triple Eight Race Engineering	Ford Falcon (FG)	55	Retired	9
Ret	14	(Australia) Cameron McConville	Brad Jones Racing	Holden Commodore (VE)	54	Retired	14
Ret	16	(Australia) Mark McNally	Kelly Racing	Holden Commodore (VE)	47	Retired	29
Ret	3	(Australia) Jason Bargwanna	Tasman Motorsport	Holden Commodore (VE)	38	Retired	11
Ret	12	(Australia) Dean Fiore	Triple F Racing	Holden Commodore (VE)	37	Retired	27
Ret	2	(Australia) Garth Tander	Holden Racing Team	Holden Commodore (VE)	28	Retired	7
Ret	11	(Australia) Jack Perkins	Kelly Racing	Holden Commodore (VE)	26	Retired	28
Ret	8	(New Zealand) Jason Richards	Brad Jones Racing	Holden Commodore (VE)	24	Retired	15
Ret	33	(Australia) Lee Holdsworth	Garry Rogers Motorsport	Holden Commodore (VE)	21	Retired	1
Ret	15	(Australia) Rick Kelly	Kelly Racing	Holden Commodore (VE)	12	Retired	3
Fastest lap: Craig Lowndes (Triple Eight Race Engineering), 1:30.9782

== Standings ==
- After Race 26 of 26

Pos	No	Name	Team	Points
1	1	(Australia) Jamie Whincup	Triple Eight Race Engineering	3349
2	22	(Australia) Will Davison	Holden Racing Team	3044
3	2	(Australia) Garth Tander	Holden Racing Team	2916
4	888	(Australia) Craig Lowndes	Triple Eight Race Engineering	2592
5	5	(Australia) Mark Winterbottom	Ford Performance Racing	2414
