= 2014 Sydney NRMA 500 =

2014 V8 Supercar championship race

(New South Wales) 2014 Sydney NRMA 500
Event Information
- Round 14 of 14 in the 2014 International V8 Supercars Championship
- Date: 5–7 December 2014
- Location: Sydney, New South Wales
- Venue: Homebush Street Circuit
- Weather: Fine, thunderstorms in Races 2 and 3

Results
Race 1
Distance	37 laps	125 km
Pole position	Will Davison; Erebus Motorsport	1:28.7640
Winner	Jamie Whincup; Triple Eight Race Engineering	1:01:50.6379
Race 2
Distance	23 laps	78 km
Pole position	Jason Bright; Brad Jones Racing	1:27.7889
Winner	Jamie Whincup; Triple Eight Race Engineering	1:05:51.1979
Race 3
Distance	44 laps	150 km
Pole position	Scott McLaughlin; Garry Rogers Motorsport	1:28.3139
Winner	Shane van Gisbergen; Tekno Autosports	1:14:50.0420

The 2014 Sydney NRMA 500 was a motor race for V8 Supercars held on 5 to 7 December 2014. The event was held at the Homebush Street Circuit in Sydney Olympic Park, New South Wales, and was scheduled to consist of two races of 125 kilometres and one race of 250 kilometres in length. It was the final race of the 2014 International V8 Supercars Championship, and marked the series return of 2003 and 2004 Champion Marcos Ambrose.

== Report ==
Will Davison scored the first pole position for Erebus Motorsport after qualifying for Race 36 was suspended with a minute remaining. Champion drivers Craig Lowndes and wildcard entry Marcos Ambrose both drove into the wall at the infamous turn 5, causing the red flag. 2014 series champ Jamie Whincup took the lead from Davison at turn 1 on the first lap. After pit stops, Walkinshaw Racing's Tim Slade took the lead and led for the majority of the race. With a few laps remaining, Whincup reclaimed the lead and won the race ahead of Slade. Rod Nash Racing's David Reynolds finished third, scoring his first and only podium finish of the season.

The weather had overshadowed the start of Race 37, possibly recreating a repeat of the 2010 event. The rain held off at the start of the race as Whincup shot from 4th on the grid to the lead after turn 1. Ambrose had a shocking start to the second race after being spun around on turn 1. The safety car was deployed on lap 19 after torrential rain proved hard for the drivers, too hard for David Wall who left it too late change for wet tyres and collected the wall at turn 2. Soon after, the race was red flagged after lightning and thunderstorms rolled in. The race continued under the safety car after the rain died down. Time expired on lap 23 and Whincup was declared the winner, claiming back-to-back wins on Saturday. Shane van Gisbergen and Scott McLaughlin rounded out the podium placings.

After Sunday's Top 10 Shootout, McLaughlin scored pole position for the final race of the season. He and Whincup managed to score the most pole positions of the season with 10 apiece. The final race started on a wet track with Garth Tander taking the lead after the first turn. Mark Winterbottom's quest for second in the championship ended early after driving straight ahead at turn 1 on the first lap. At the half-way mark, the race was again overshadowed by severe thunderstorms. As the safety car was called out, Tander locked up and went straight ahead at turn 9, handing the lead to Van Gisbergen. After 44 of 74 laps, the race was suspended and later abandoned after more torrential rain battered down on the circuit, with Van Gisbergen taking the win for the final race of the season having completed over 50% of the race distance, which is required to award points. For the second event in a row, Tander narrowly missed out on a race win and had to settle for second. Teammate James Courtney made it a 2-3 finish for the Holden Racing Team.

Whincup collected his sixth championship trophy, a new record for the most championships in the ATCC/V8 Supercars. The race win for Van Gisbergen gave him second place in the standings, with Winterbottom sliding down to third in the championship after a disastrous weekend in Sydney.

After nine years since his last V8 Supercar event, Marcos Ambrose finished 20th, 21st and 16th respectively in the three races.
