= 2015 V8 Supercars Dunlop Series =

Motor racing competition

The 2015 V8 Supercars Dunlop Series was an Australian motor racing competition for V8 Supercars, staged as support series to the International V8 Supercars Championship. It was the sixteenth annual V8 Supercar Development Series and the fourth to be contested under the "Dunlop Series" name.

The series was won by Cam Waters driving a Ford FG Falcon.

== Teams and drivers ==
The following teams and drivers contested the 2015 V8 Supercars Dunlop Series:

Manufacturer	Model	Team	No.	Driver	Rounds	Co-Driver	Rounds
Ford	Falcon FG	Image Racing	2	(Australia) Dan Day	All		
Ford	Falcon FG	Image Racing	10	(Australia) Jesse Dixon	1–5		
Ford	Falcon FG	Image Racing	10	(Australia) Grant Denyer	6		
Ford	Falcon FG	Image Racing	10	(Australia) Jonathon Webb	7		
Ford	Falcon FG	Prodrive Racing Australia	5	(Australia) Cam Waters	All		
Ford	Falcon FG	RSport Engineering	7	(Australia) Brett Hobson	5		
Ford	Falcon FG	Matt Chahda Motorsport	18	(Australia) Matt Chahda	3–7		
Ford	Falcon FG	MW Motorsport	28	(Australia) Jack Le Brocq	1–6		
Ford	Falcon FG	MW Motorsport	28	(Australia) Bryce Fullwood	7		
Ford	Falcon FG	MW Motorsport	42	(New Zealand) Chris Pither	1–6		
Ford	Falcon FG	MW Motorsport	42	(Australia) Jack Le Brocq	7		
Ford	Falcon FG	Matt Stone Racing	35	(Australia) Todd Hazelwood	All		
Ford	Falcon FG	Matt Stone Racing	90	(Australia) Shae Davies	All		
Ford	Falcon FG	Paul Morris Motorsport	55	(Australia) Renee Gracie	All		
Ford	Falcon FG	Paul Morris Motorsport	67	(Australia) Paul Morris	1–6		
Ford	Falcon FG	Novocastrian Motorsport (PMM)	58	(Australia) Aaren Russell	All	(Australia) Drew Russell	6
Ford	Falcon FG	Super Black Racing (MW)	111	(New Zealand) Simon Evans	All		
Holden	Commodore VE	Eggleston Motorsport	1	(Australia) Paul Dumbrell	All		
Holden	Commodore VE	Eggleston Motorsport	38	(New Zealand) Ant Pedersen	1–6		
Holden	Commodore VE	Eggleston Motorsport	38	(Australia) Liam McAdam	7		
Holden	Commodore VE	Eggleston Motorsport	54	(Australia) Garry Jacobson	All		
Holden	Commodore VE	Eggleston Motorsport	88	(Australia) Liam McAdam	6		
Holden	Commodore VE	Jamie Sharp Racing	3	(Australia) Jamie Sharp	1		
Holden	Commodore VE	RSport Engineering	4	(Australia) Kurt Kostecki	1–4		
Holden	Commodore VE	RSport Engineering	4	(Australia) Phil Woodbury	5–7		
Holden	Commodore VE	RSport Engineering	7	(Australia) Brett Hobson	1–4		
Holden	Commodore VE	RSport Engineering	11	(Australia) Matt Chahda	1–2		
Holden	Commodore VE	RSport Engineering	11	(Australia) Phil Woodbury	3		
Holden	Commodore VE	Brad Jones Racing	8	(Australia) Andrew Jones	All		
Holden	Commodore VE	Brad Jones Racing	14	(Australia) Macauley Jones	All		
Holden	Commodore VE	Brad Jones Racing	21	(Australia) Josh Kean	All		
Holden	Commodore VE	Paul Morris Motorsport	16	(Australia) Bryce Fullwood	1–6		
Holden	Commodore VE	THR Developments	45	(Australia) Taz Douglas	1–4		
Holden	Commodore VE	THR Developments	46	(Australia) Chelsea Angelo	1		
Holden	Commodore VE	THR Developments	46	(Australia) Jason Leoncini	2–3		
Holden	Commodore VE	THR Developments	46	(Australia) Geoff Emery	4		
Holden	Commodore VE	Matt Hansen Racing	50	(Australia) Matt Hansen	1–3		
Holden	Commodore VE	Warrin Mining	62	(Australia) Adam Wallis	1, 4		
Holden	Commodore VE	McGill Motorsport	75	(Australia) Aaron McGill	All	(Australia) Michael Caine	6
Holden	Commodore VE	Dragon Motor Racing; Garry Rogers Motorsport	99	(Australia) James Golding	All		

The 2015 V8 Supercars Dunlop Series featured a new race number allocation system. Each year since the series began in 2000, the race number pool was shared with the main V8 Supercars Championship, meaning that numbers used in that series could not be used in the Dunlop Series. For 2015, an individual number pool was allocated to each series.

== Calendar ==
The 2015 V8 Supercars Dunlop Series was contested over seven rounds. The calendar was released on 18 November 2014.

Series schedule						Results summary	
Rnd.	Race	Event	Circuit	Location	Date	Winning driver	Round winner
1	1	(South Australia) Clipsal 500 Adelaide	Adelaide Street Circuit	Adelaide, South Australia	27 February	(Australia) Cam Waters	(Australia) Paul Dumbrell
1	2	(South Australia) Clipsal 500 Adelaide	Adelaide Street Circuit	Adelaide, South Australia	28 February	(Australia) Paul Dumbrell	(Australia) Paul Dumbrell
2	1	(Western Australia) Ubet Perth Super Sprint	Barbagallo Raceway	Perth, Western Australia	2 May	(Australia) Cam Waters	(Australia) Cam Waters
2	2	(Western Australia) Ubet Perth Super Sprint	Barbagallo Raceway	Perth, Western Australia	3 May	(Australia) Cam Waters	(Australia) Cam Waters
2	3	(Western Australia) Ubet Perth Super Sprint	Barbagallo Raceway	Perth, Western Australia	3 May	(Australia) Cam Waters	(Australia) Cam Waters
3	1	(Victoria (state)) NP300 Navara Winton Super Sprint	Winton Motor Raceway	Benalla, Victoria	16 May	(Australia) Cam Waters	(Australia) Cam Waters
3	2	(Victoria (state)) NP300 Navara Winton Super Sprint	Winton Motor Raceway	Benalla, Victoria	17 May	(Australia) Cam Waters	(Australia) Cam Waters
3	3	(Victoria (state)) NP300 Navara Winton Super Sprint	Winton Motor Raceway	Benalla, Victoria	17 May	(Australia) Cam Waters	(Australia) Cam Waters
4	1	(Queensland) Castrol Edge Townsville 400	Townsville Street Circuit	Townsville, Queensland	11 July	(Australia) Cam Waters	(Australia) Cam Waters
4	2	(Queensland) Castrol Edge Townsville 400	Townsville Street Circuit	Townsville, Queensland	12 July	(Australia) Paul Dumbrell	(Australia) Cam Waters
5	1	(Queensland) Coates Hire Ipswich Super Sprint	Queensland Raceway	Ipswich, Queensland	1 August	(Australia) Cam Waters	(Australia) Cam Waters
5	2	(Queensland) Coates Hire Ipswich Super Sprint	Queensland Raceway	Ipswich, Queensland	2 August	(Australia) Cam Waters	(Australia) Cam Waters
5	3	(Queensland) Coates Hire Ipswich Super Sprint	Queensland Raceway	Ipswich, Queensland	2 August	(New Zealand) Chris Pither	(Australia) Cam Waters
6	1	(New South Wales) Bathurst 250	Mount Panorama Circuit	Bathurst, New South Wales	10 October	(Australia) Paul Dumbrell	(Australia) Paul Dumbrell
7	1	(New South Wales) Coates Hire Sydney 500	Homebush Street Circuit	Sydney, New South Wales	5 December	(Australia) Paul Dumbrell	(Australia) Paul Dumbrell
7	2	(New South Wales) Coates Hire Sydney 500	Homebush Street Circuit	Sydney, New South Wales	6 December	(Australia) Paul Dumbrell	(Australia) Paul Dumbrell

Note: In the above table, "Event" refers to the V8 Supercars Championship meeting at which the Dunlop Series round was contested.

== Points system ==
Series points were awarded in each race as per the following:

Round format	Position																													
Round format	1st	2nd	3rd	4th	5th	6th	7th	8th	9th	10th	11th	12th	13th	14th	15th	16th	17th	18th	19th	20th	21st	22nd	23rd	24th	25th	26th	27th	28th	29th	30th
Three races	100	92	86	80	74	68	64	60	56	52	48	46	44	42	40	38	36	34	32	30	28	26	24	22	20	18	16	14	12	10
Two races	150	138	129	120	111	102	96	90	84	78	72	69	66	63	60	57	54	51	48	45	42	39	36	33	30	27	24	21	18	15
One race	300	276	258	240	222	204	192	180	168	156	144	138	132	126	120	114	108	102	96	90	84	78	72	66	60	54	48	42	36	30

== Championship standings ==
Pos.	Driver	No.	ADE (South Australia)		BAR (Western Australia)			WIN (Victoria (state))			TOW (Queensland)		QLD (Queensland)			BAT (New South Wales)	SYD (New South Wales)		Pen.	Pts.
1	(Australia) Cameron Waters	5	**1**	**2**	1	**1**	**1**	**1**	**1**	**1**	**1**	2	**1**	**1**	3	2	8	2	0	1966
2	(Australia) Paul Dumbrell	1	2	1	4	10	2	3	3	3	5	1	3	4	2	**1**	**1**	1	0	1889
3	(Australia) Jack Le Brocq	28/42	7	7	3	3	4	4	4	5	3	4	2	3	5	9	5	**3**	0	1587
4	(Australia) Todd Hazelwood	35	9	8	6	4	8	13	7	8	6	5	6	7	9	5	3	6	0	1404
5	(New Zealand) Chris Pither	42	3	12	**2**	2	22	6	5	4	11	**3**	5	5	**1**	3			0	1337
6	(Australia) Garry Jacobson	54	5	6	9	8	7	15	10	18	2	9	7	6	8	10	2	15	0	1287
7	(Australia) Andrew Jones	8	8	4	Ret	Ret	2	2	2	2	DNS	DNS	4	2	6	4	6	4	0	1274
8	(Australia) Shae Davies	90	10	10	7	7	15	10	6	6	7	18	13	10	11	16	7	11	15	1070
9	(New Zealand) Simon Evans	111	17	23	13	12	11	14	18	9	13	6	12	9	7	12	15	12	0	961
10	(Australia) James Golding	99	19	Ret	11	6	9	5	Ret	11	Ret	8	11	19	20	7	4	9	0	938
11	(Australia) Aaren Russell	58	6	3	5	23	24	25	14	7	8	Ret	9	Ret	14	20	9	7	0	935
12	(Australia) Macauley Jones	14	13	11	15	11	5	Ret	16	16	9	Ret	16	14	13	8	16	8	0	911
13	(New Zealand) Ant Pedersen	38	4	5	12	17	10	7	8	12	4	Ret	8	8	4	Ret			0	855
14	(Australia) Paul Morris	67	23	14	8	5	6	11	9	10	10	7	DNS	DNS	DNS	6			40	795
15	(Australia) Dan Day	2	12	25	19	16	23	18	17	22	20	13	18	18	17	14	17	16	0	741
16	(Australia) Jesse Dixon	10	11	13	10	9	20	8	Ret	15	12	16	10	13	10				0	650
17	(Australia) Bryce Fullwood	16/28	20	Ret	DNS	14	12	20	20	20	Ret	11	Ret	11	12	18	10	10	0	647
18	(Australia) Renee Gracie	55	21	20	20	13	17	19	19	21	Ret	12	17	Ret	15	19	13	14	25	634
19	(Australia) Josh Kean	21	Ret	16	16	15	13	9	11	25	15	17	14	17	18	Ret	11	Ret	25	576
20	(Australia) Aaron McGill	75	15	21	21	21	18	24	24	24	Ret	15	21	DNS	DNS	17	Ret	17	0	508
21	(Australia) Taz Douglas	45	18	9	14	Ret	14	12	12	13	14	10							0	496
22	(Australia) Matt Chahda	11/18	14	17	DNS	DNS	DNS	17	13	23	17	Ret	19	12	19	Ret	14	Ret	25	423
23	(Australia) Brett Hobson	7	Ret	DNS	23	22	19	22	23	26	16	DNS	15	15	16				0	325
24	(Australia) Kurt Kostecki	4	25	24	17	20	16	16	22	14	21	Ret							25	290
25	(Australia) Adam Wallis	62	16	15							19	14							0	228
26	(Australia) Liam McAdam	38/88														11	18	13	50	211
27	(Australia) Matt Hansen	50	Ret	19	22	18	Ret	23	21	17									0	196
28	(Australia) Jason Leoncini	46			18	19	21	21	15	19									0	194
29	(Australia) Phil Woodbury	4/11						DNS	DNS	DNS			20	16	Ret	15	DNS	DNS	0	188
30	(Australia) Jonathon Webb	10															12	5	0	180
31	(Australia) Grant Denyer	10														13			0	132
32	(Australia) Michael Caine	75														17			0	108
33	(Australia) Chelsea Angelo	46	22	18															0	90
34	(Australia) Drew Russell	58														20			0	90
35	(Australia) Jamie Sharp	3	24	22															0	72
36	(Australia) Geoff Emery	46									18	DNS							0	51
Pos.	Driver	No.	ADE (South Australia)		BAR (Western Australia)			WIN (Victoria (state))			TOW (Queensland)		QLD (Queensland)			BAT (New South Wales)	SYD (New South Wales)		Pen.	Pts.

Colour	Result
Gold	Winner
Silver	Second place
Bronze	Third place
Green	Points classification
Blue	Non-points classification
Blue	Non-classified finish (NC)
Purple	Retired, not classified (Ret)
Red	Did not qualify (DNQ)
Red	Did not pre-qualify (DNPQ)
Black	Disqualified (DSQ)
White	Did not start (DNS)
White	Withdrew (WD)
White	Race cancelled (C)
Blank	Did not practice (DNP)
Blank	Did not arrive (DNA)
Blank	Excluded (EX)

Bold - Pole position
Italics - Fastest lap

== See also ==
- 2015 V8 Supercar season
