= 2013 Australian Formula Ford Championship =

Motor racing competition

Seasons
- ← 2012 2014 →

The 2013 Australian Formula Ford Championship was a CAMS sanctioned Australian motor racing title for drivers of Formula Ford racing cars. It was the 44th national series for Formula Fords to be held in Australia and the 21 to carry the Australian Formula Ford Championship name. CAMS filled the role of Category Manager for the championship. The championship was contested over a seven-round series which began on 5 April at the Symmons Plains International Raceway and ended on 8 December at the Homebush Street Circuit. It was won by Anton de Pasquale, driving a Mygale SJ13a.

== Teams and drivers ==
The following teams and drivers contested the 2013 Australian Formula Ford Championship. Each car was powered by a 1600cc Ford Duratec engine, as mandated by the category regulations. All drivers were Australian-registered.

Team	Chassis	No	Driver
Sonic Motor Racing Services	Mygale SJ13a	2	Anton de Pasquale
Sonic Motor Racing Services	Mygale SJ12a	3	Simon Hodge
Sonic Motor Racing Services	Mygale SJ10a	4	Luke Maquis
Sonic Motor Racing Services	Mygale SJ12a	7	Christian Morina
Anglo Motorsport	Mygale SJ10a	6	Jonathan Venter
Hamish Hardeman Motorsport	Mygale SJ10a	10	Hamish Hardeman
Minda Motorsport; CAMS Rising Stars	Mygale SJ12a	12	Jayden Wallis
Minda Motorsport; CAMS Rising Stars	Mygale SJ13a	14	Macauley Jones
Minda Motorsport; CAMS Rising Stars	Mygale SJ11a	91	Sam Breen
Minda Motorsport; CAMS Rising Stars	Mygale SJ11a	98	Liam Sager
Borland Racing Developments	Spectrum 011c	15	Tom Grech
Borland Racing Developments	Spectrum 014	31	James Golding
Synergy Motorsport	Spectrum 012	19	Ash Quiddington
Synergy Motorsport	Spectrum 014	22	Matt Campbell
Synergy Motorsport	Spectrum 014	27	Sam Power
Synergy Motorsport	Spectrum 011b	74	Trent Grubel
Synergy Motorsport	Spectrum 014	88	Greg Holloway
Ellery Motorsport Enterprises	Spectrum 012	24	Nick Ellen
RMS Performance Engineering	Spectrum 012	33	Callan Sayers
Evans Motorsport Group	Mygale SJ11a	34	Chelsea Angelo
Evans Motorsport Group	Mygale SJ13a	49	Thomas Randle
Evans Motorsport Group	Mygale SJ10a	97	Liam McAdam
WKTS Racing	Spectrum 011c	81	Wade Scott
Quadrant Creative	Spectrum 011b	87	Tim Hamilton
BF Racing	Mygale SJ11a	94	Jordan Lloyd

== Calendar ==
The championship was contested over a seven-round series.

Round	Circuit	Date	Pole position	Fastest lap	Winning driver	Winning team	Round winner
1	Symmons Plains Raceway	5–7 April	Anton de Pasquale	Matt Campbell	Sam Power	Synergy Motorsport	Anton de Pasquale
1	Symmons Plains Raceway	5–7 April		Simon Hodge	Ash Quiddington	Synergy Motorsport	Anton de Pasquale
1	Symmons Plains Raceway	5–7 April		Ash Quiddington	Sam Power	Synergy Motorsport	Anton de Pasquale
1	Symmons Plains Raceway	5–7 April		Macauley Jones	Anton de Pasquale	Sonic Motor Racing Services	Anton de Pasquale
2	Townsville Street Circuit	5–7 July	Liam Sager	Luke Marquis	Macauley Jones	Minda Motorsport	Macauley Jones
2	Townsville Street Circuit	5–7 July		Macauley Jones	Macauley Jones	Minda Motorsport	Macauley Jones
2	Townsville Street Circuit	5–7 July		Luke Marquis	Macauley Jones	Minda Motorsport	Macauley Jones
3	Queensland Raceway	27–28 July	Macauley Jones	Liam Sager	Macauley Jones	Minda Motorsport	Macauley Jones
3	Queensland Raceway	27–28 July		Macauley Jones	Liam Sager	Minda Motorsport	Macauley Jones
3	Queensland Raceway	27–28 July		Liam Sager	Macauley Jones	Minda Motorsport	Macauley Jones
4	Winton Motor Raceway	23–25 August	Anton de Pasquale	Anton de Pasquale	Anton de Pasquale	Sonic Motor Racing Services	Anton de Pasquale
4	Winton Motor Raceway	23–25 August		Macauley Jones	Anton de Pasquale	Sonic Motor Racing Services	Anton de Pasquale
4	Winton Motor Raceway	23–25 August		Anton de Pasquale	Anton de Pasquale	Sonic Motor Racing Services	Anton de Pasquale
5	Surfers Paradise Street Circuit	25–27 October	Sam Power	Anton de Pasquale	Liam Sager	Minda Motorsport	Liam Sager
5	Surfers Paradise Street Circuit	25–27 October		Liam Sager	Liam Sager	Minda Motorsport	Liam Sager
5	Surfers Paradise Street Circuit	25–27 October		Liam Sager	Liam Sager	Minda Motorsport	Liam Sager
6	Phillip Island Grand Prix Circuit	23–24 November	Hamish Hardeman	Anton de Pasquale	Anton de Pasquale	Sonic Motor Racing Services	Anton de Pasquale
6	Phillip Island Grand Prix Circuit	23–24 November		Anton de Pasquale	Anton de Pasquale	Sonic Motor Racing Services	Anton de Pasquale
6	Phillip Island Grand Prix Circuit	23–24 November		Anton de Pasquale	Anton de Pasquale	Sonic Motor Racing Services	Anton de Pasquale
7	Homebush Street Circuit	6–8 December	Liam Sager	Liam Sager	Liam Sager	Minda Motorsport	Macauley Jones
7	Homebush Street Circuit	6–8 December		Anton de Pasquale	Liam Sager	Minda Motorsport	Macauley Jones
7	Homebush Street Circuit	6–8 December		Liam Sager	Macauley Jones	Minda Motorsport	Macauley Jones

== Points system ==
Championship points were awarded on a 20–16–14–12–10–8–6–4–2–1 basis to the top ten classified finishers in each race. An additional point was awarded to the driver achieving the fastest lap in qualifying at each round of the championship.

The results for each round of the Series were determined by the number of points scored by each driver at that round. The driver gaining the highest points total over the seven rounds was declared the winner of the Championship.

== Results ==
Pos.	Driver	SYM				TOW			QLD			WIN			SUR			PHI			SYD			Pen.	Points
1	Anton de Pasquale	2	2	2	1	5	2	5	3	3	Ret	1	1	1	3	3	2	1	1	1	2	Ret	2	−5	326
2	Liam Sager	6	Ret	6	5	2	Ret	3	2	2	1	3	Ret	6	1	1	1	2	6	5	1	1	Ret		266
3	Sam Power	1	Ret	1	2	3	6	Ret	Ret	6	5	5	3	2	2	2	3	5	3	2	3	3	3		265
4	Macauley Jones	10	3	5	3	1	1	1	1	1	3	2	2	Ret	6	Ret	6	3	Ret	9	4	2	1	−5	261
5	Simon Hodge	9	5	4	4	4	Ret	7	5	8	4	11	6	5	7	Ret	9	4	5	8	6	4	Ret		152
6	Jordan Lloyd	5	4	7	Ret	7	5	4	Ret	4	6	7	5	3	5	5	Ret	8	10	10	DNS	DNS	DNS		132
7	Thomas Randle					8	3	6	4	5	2	6	12	10	8	Ret	7	6	4	6	11	6	4		131
8	Luke Marquis	4	6	Ret	Ret	6	4	2	8	15	8	Ret	10	11	4	4	4	Ret	7	4	Ret	9	5	−5	128
9	Matt Campbell	7	7	8	6	9	9	10	13	12	9	9	7	Ret	12	9	Ret	7	11	12	5	5	13		67
10	James Golding											4	4	4				9	2	3				−5	63
11	Ash Quiddington	3	1	3	7	10	7	Ret	11	10	Ret	Ret	Ret	Ret							Ret	10	8	−5	62
12	Jayden Wallis	13	8	10	8	12	11	11	6	7	7	8	15	9	10	7	5	11	13	13	8	8	10	−10	51
13	Chelsea Angelo											10	14	7	9	6	Ret	Ret	12	14	7	7	6		37
14	Hamish Hardeman											13	9	8				12	8	7					16
15	Sam Breen	11	10	9	9	11	8	8	8	13	10	12	8	Ret										−5	16
16	Wade Scott								10	11	Ret				11	8	8								9
17	Jonathan Venter	8	9	11	Ret	13	10	9																	9
18	Nicholas Rowe																				9	12	7		8
19	Liam McAdam								9	9	12	15	Ret	13	13	10	10	13	15	16					6
20	Tom Grech											14	11	12				10	9	11					3
21	Jake Spencer																				10	11	9		3
	Callan Sayers	12	11	12	Ret																				0
	Trent Grubel														Ret	11	Ret				13	13	12		0
	Greg Holloway								12	14	11														0
	Jacob Parsons																				12	Ret	11		0
	Tim Hamilton														DNS	12	11								0
	Nick Ellen											16	13	14											0
	Caitlin Wood																				Ret	14	14		0
	Christian Morina																	Ret	14	15					0
Pos.	Driver	SYM				TOW			QLD			WIN			SUR			PHI			SYD			Pen.	Points

Colour	Result
Gold	Winner
Silver	Second place
Bronze	Third place
Green	Points classification
Blue	Non-points classification
Blue	Non-classified finish (NC)
Purple	Retired, not classified (Ret)
Red	Did not qualify (DNQ)
Red	Did not pre-qualify (DNPQ)
Black	Disqualified (DSQ)
White	Did not start (DNS)
White	Withdrew (WD)
White	Race cancelled (C)
Blank	Did not practice (DNP)
Blank	Did not arrive (DNA)
Blank	Excluded (EX)
