= James Golding (racing driver) =

Australian racing driver

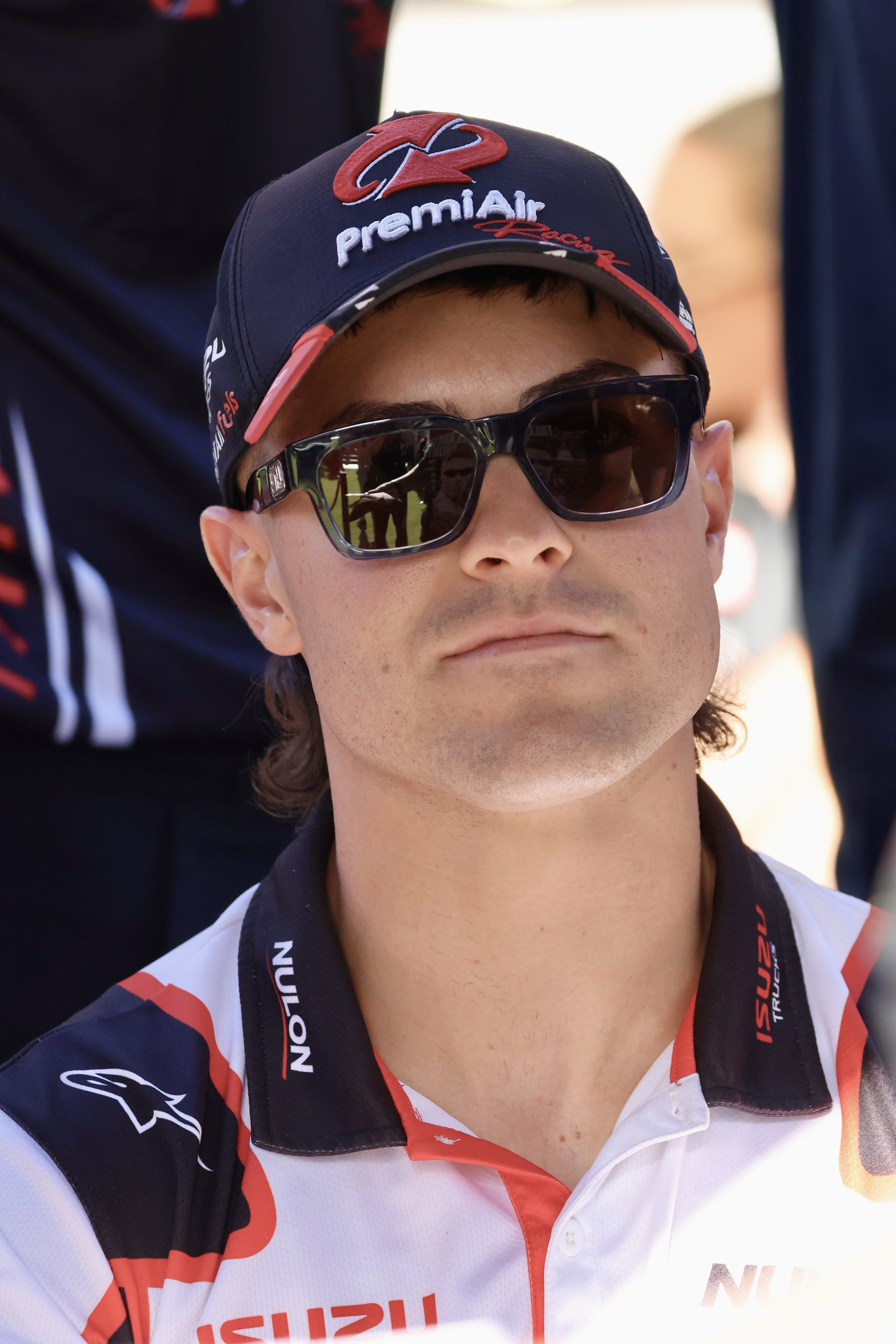
- James Golding in 2025
- Nationality: Australian
- Born: James Bodee Golding; 19 January 1996 (age 30) Warragul, Victoria
- Categorisation: FIA Silver (until 2023); FIA Gold (2024–)

Supercars Championship career
- Current team: Blanchard Racing Team
- Championships: 0
- Races: 207
- Wins: 0
- Podiums: 4
- Pole positions: 2
- 2024 position: 7th (1991 pts)

James Bodee Golding (born 19 January 1996) is an Australian racing driver who competes in the Repco Supercars Championship driving the No. 7 Ford Mustang S650 for Blanchard Racing Team.

== Career ==
=== Early career ===
A multiple Victorian karting champion, Golding moved into the Victorian Formula Ford championship in 2013, finishing fourth. He then stepped up to the national series in 2014, where he finished third despite only being eight points shy of the overall winner, Thomas Randle.

=== Supercars ===
Golding caught the attention of Garry Rogers, who signed him into his Dunlop Series team for the 2015 season. In his debut season, he finished tenth in the overall standings, beating season regulars such as Aaren Russell and Paul Morris, as well as other rising talents like Macauley Jones.

In 2016, Golding was drafted into the main series for the endurance events, driving alongside James Moffat in the Volvo S60. In his debut race, the 2016 Wilson Security Sandown 500, Golding crashed heavily on the first lap after the front right tyre deflated at high speed.

At the 2025 Bathurst 1000, Golding crossed the line first, but was dropped down to third after being handed a five second penalty for a driving infringement on Cooper Murray, giving the win to Matt Payne and Garth Tander.

== Racing record ==
=== Karting career summary ===
Season	Series	Position
2009	Queensland Sprint Kart Championship - Rookies	10th
2009	City of Melbourne Kart Titles - Rookies	5th
2009	Albury/Wodonga Victorian Closed Titles - Rookies	**2nd**
2009	TradeInMyCar Enduro - Rookies	6th
2010	City of Melbourne Kart Titles - Junior National Light	**1st**
2010	Victorian Open Kart Titles - Junior National Light	**3rd**
2010	Champion of Champions Junior Classic - Junior Pro	**1st**
2010	Champion of Champions Junior Classic - Junior National Light	**3rd**
2010	Oakleigh Kart Club Top Guns - Junior National Light	6th
2011	Australian National Sprint Kart Championship - Junior National Light	**1st**
2011	Australian Rotax Nationals - Formula JMA Light	**2nd**
2011	City of Melbourne Kart Titles - Junior National Light	5th
2011	City of Melbourne Kart Titles - Junior Rotax	5th
2012	Rotax Max Challenge Grand Finals - Junior	7th
2012	Australian Rotax Nationals - Rotax Junior	**3rd**
2017	Australian Kart Championship - KZ2	7th
2019	SP Tools Australian Kart Championship - KZ2	4th
2022	SP Tools Australian Kart Championship - KZ2	6th
2022	SKUSA SuperNations - Pro Shifter	36th
2023	SP Tools Australian Kart Championship - KZ2	4th
2023	SKUSA SuperNations - Pro Shifter	24th
2025	Stars of Karting - KZ2	**2nd**
2025	SKUSA SuperNations - Pro Shifter	24th

=== Circuit career results ===
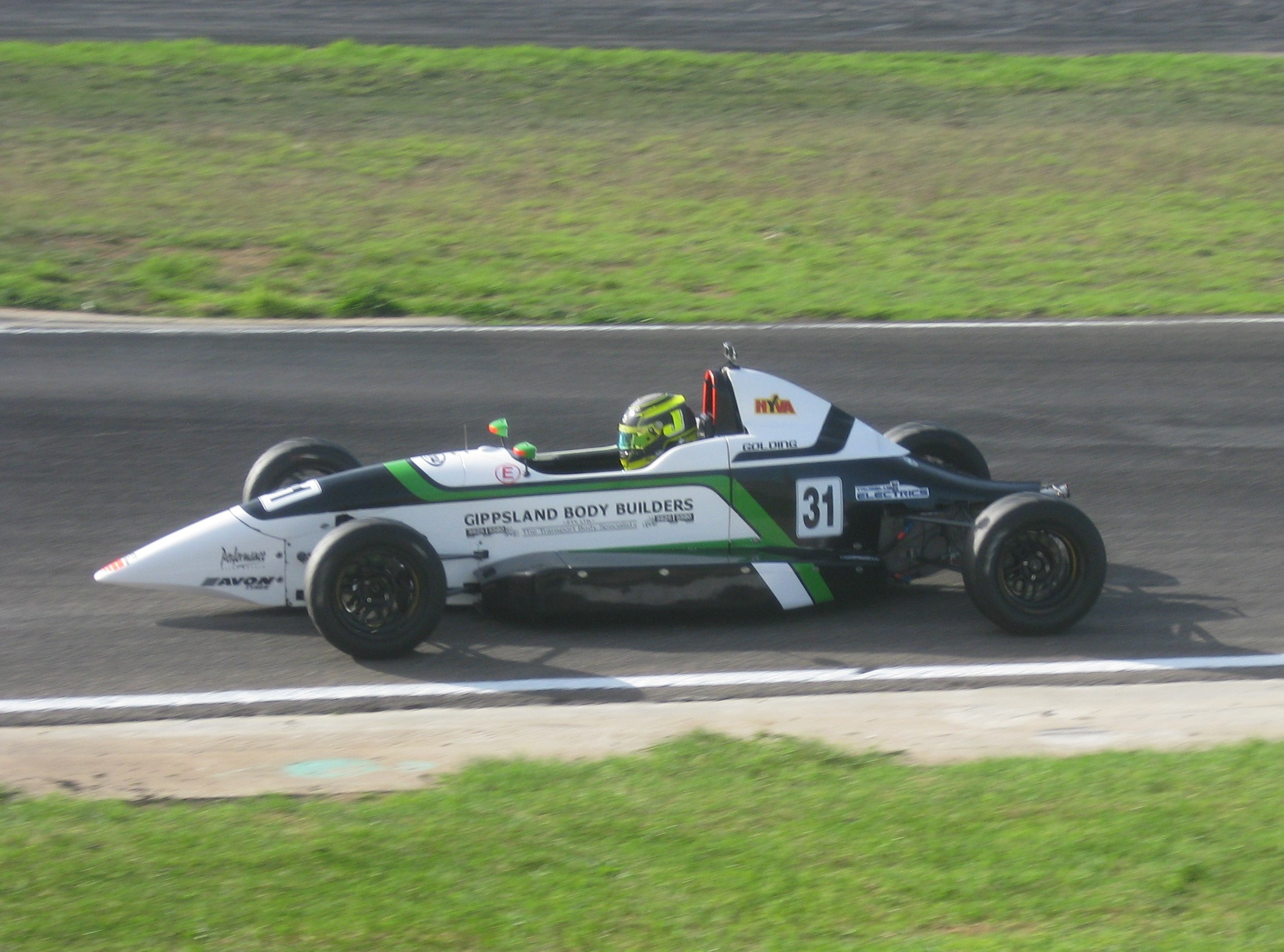
Golding placed third in the 2014 Australian Formula Ford Series driving a Spectrum 014

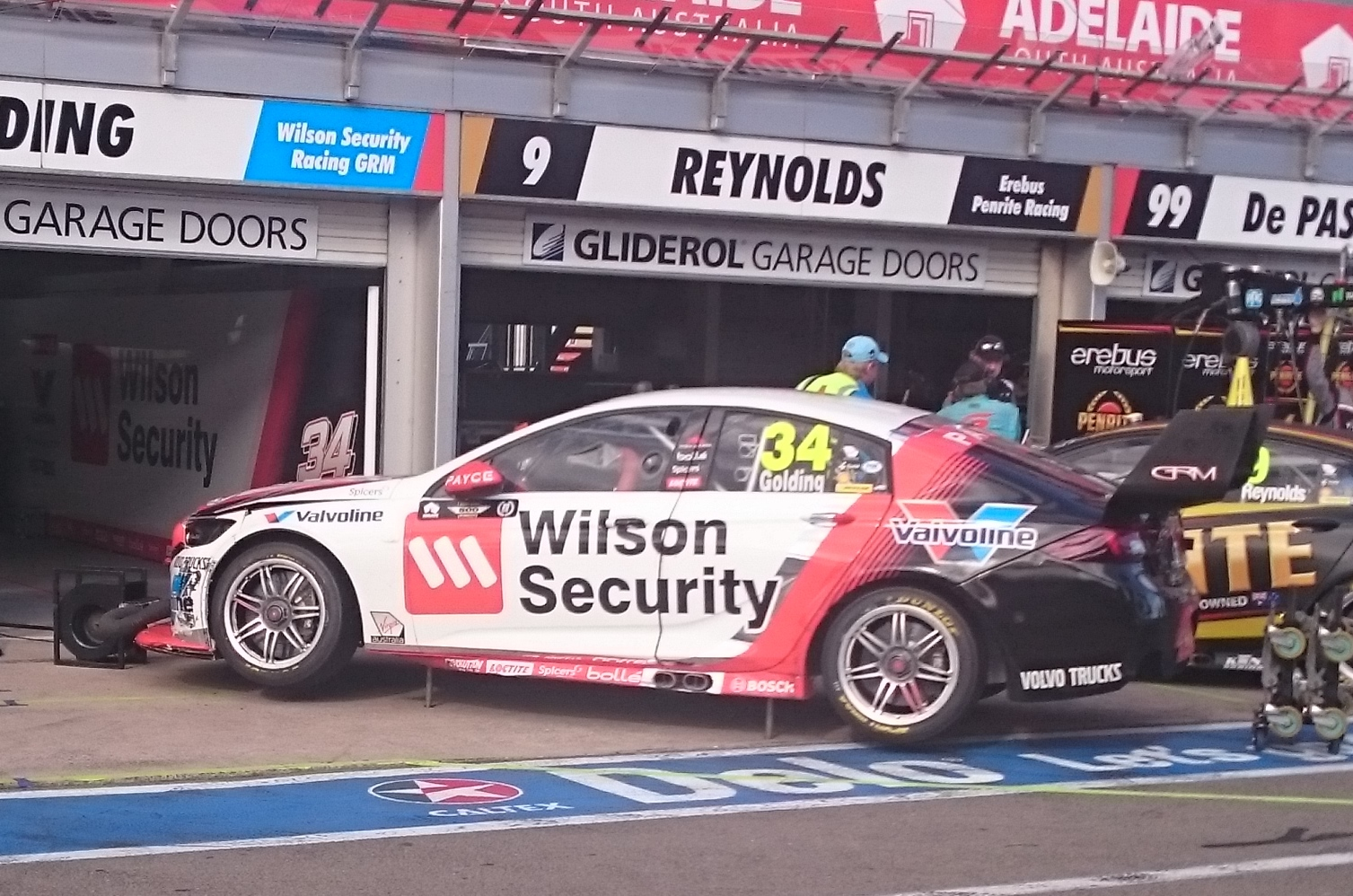
Golding placed 22nd in the 2018 Virgin Australia Supercars Championship driving a Holden Commodore ZB

Season	Series	Position	Car	Team
2013	Australian Formula Ford Championship	9th	Spectrum 014 - Ford	Borland Racing Developments
2013	Victorian Formula Ford Championship	5th	Spectrum 014 - Ford	Zsidy Racing
2014	Australian Formula Ford Series	**3rd**	Spectrum 014 - Ford	Borland Racing Developments
2014	New South Wales Formula Ford Championship	7th	Spectrum 014 - Ford	Borland Racing Developments
2015	V8 Supercars Dunlop Series	10th	Holden VE Commodore	Garry Rogers Motorsport
2016	Supercars Dunlop Series	4th	Holden VF Commodore	Garry Rogers Motorsport
2016	International V8 Supercars Championship	52nd	Volvo S60	Garry Rogers Motorsport
2017	Virgin Australia Supercars Championship	26th	Holden VF Commodore	Garry Rogers Motorsport
2018	Virgin Australia Supercars Championship	22nd	Holden ZB Commodore	Garry Rogers Motorsport
2019	Virgin Australia Supercars Championship	20th	Holden ZB Commodore	Garry Rogers Motorsport
2020	Virgin Australia Supercars Championship	33rd	Holden ZB Commodore	Team 18
2021	S5000 Australia	4th	Rogers AF01/V8	Garry Rogers Motorsport
2021	S5000 Tasman Series	**3rd**	Rogers AF01/V8	Garry Rogers Motorsport
2022	S5000 Australia	**2nd**	Rogers AF01/V8	Garry Rogers Motorsport
2022	Repco Supercars Championship	25th	Holden ZB Commodore	PremiAir Racing
2023	S5000 Australia	7th	Rogers AF01/V8	Garry Rogers Motorsport
2023	Repco Supercars Championship	16th	Chevrolet Camaro ZL1	PremiAir Racing
2024	Australian National Trans-Am Series	4th	Ford Mustang	Garry Rogers Motorsport
2024	Repco Supercars Championship	7th	Chevrolet Camaro ZL1	PremiAir Racing
2025	World Time Attack Challenge - Hypercar	**1st**	Brabham BT62	Van Diemen Family
2025	Repco Supercars Championship	14th	Chevrolet Camaro ZL1	PremiAir Racing
2025	Australian National Trans-Am Series	**3rd**	Ford Mustang	Garry Rogers Motorsport

=== Complete Super2 Series results ===
(key) (Races in bold indicate pole position) (Races in italics indicate fastest lap)

Year	Team	No.	Car	1	2	3	4	5	6	7	8	9	10	11	12	13	14	15	16	Position	Points
2015	Garry Rogers Motorsport	99	Holden VF Commodore	ADE; R1; 19	ADE; R2; Ret	BAR; R3; 11	BAR; R4; 6	BAR; R5; 9	WIN; R6; 5	WIN; R7; Ret	WIN; R8; 11	TOW; R9; Ret	TOW; R10; 8	QLD; R11; 11	QLD; R12; 19	QLD; R13; 20	BAT; R14; 7	SYD; R15; 4	SYD; R16; 9	10th	938
2016	Garry Rogers Motorsport	99	Holden VF Commodore	ADE; R1; 13	ADE; R2; 2	PHI; R3; 2	PHI; R4; 1	**PHI**; **R5**; 2	BAR; R6; 10	BAR; R7; 2	BAR; R8; 4	TOW; R9; 9	TOW; R10; 4	SAN; R11; 13	SAN; R12; 6	SAN; R13; 1	BAT; R14; Ret	SYD; R15; 2	SYD; R16; 2	4th	1404

=== Supercars Championship results ===
Supercars results
Year	Team	No.	Car	1	2	3	4	5	6	7	8	9	10	11	12	13	14	15	16	17	18	19	20	21	22	23	24	25	26	27	28	29	30	31	32	33	34	35	36	37	Position	Points
2016	Garry Rogers Motorsport	34	Volvo S60	ADE; R1	ADE; R2	ADE; R3	SYM; R4	SYM; R5	PHI; R6	PHI; R7	BAR; R8	BAR; R9	WIN; R10	WIN; R11	HID; R12	HID; R13	TOW; R14	TOW; R15	QLD; R16; PO	QLD; R17; PO	SMP; R18	SMP; R19	SAN; Q 7	SAN; R20; Ret	BAT; R21; Ret	SUR; R22; 5	SUR; R23; 12	PUK; R24	PUK; R25	PUK; R26	PUK; R27	SYD; R28	SYD; R29								52nd	180
2017	Garry Rogers Motorsport	31	Holden VF Commodore	ADE; R1	ADE; R2	SYM; R3	SYM; R4	PHI; R5	PHI; R6	BAR; R7	BAR; R8	WIN; R9; 16	WIN; R10; 25	HID; R11	HID; R12	TOW; R13	TOW; R14	QLD; R15; 24	QLD; R16; 21	SMP; R17	SMP; R18																				26th	624
2017	Garry Rogers Motorsport	33	Holden VF Commodore																			SAN; Q 8	SAN; R19; 4	BAT; R20; 18	SUR; R21; 13	SUR; R22; 17	PUK; R23	PUK; R24	NEW; R25	NEW; R26											26th	624
2018	Garry Rogers Motorsport	34	Holden ZB Commodore	ADE; R1; Ret	ADE; R2; 19	MEL; R3; 21	MEL; R4; 17	MEL; R5; 24	MEL; R6; Ret	SYM; R7; 24	SYM; R8; 18	PHI; R9; 25	PHI; R10; 19	BAR; R11; 22	BAR; R12; 25	WIN; R13; 21	WIN; R14; 25	HID; R15; 26	HID; R16; 22	TOW; R17; 16	TOW; R18; 16	QLD; R19; 18	QLD; R20; 15	SMP; R21; 13	BEN; R22; 21	BEN; R23; 24	SAN; QR; 24	SAN; R24; 18	BAT; R25; 8	SUR; R26; 24	SUR; R27; C	PUK; R28; 14	PUK; R29; 21	NEW; R30; 20	NEW; R31; 25						22nd	1418
2019	Garry Rogers Motorsport	34	Holden ZB Commodore	ADE; R1; 14	ADE; R2; 19	MEL; R3; 16	MEL; R4; 23	MEL; R5; 18	MEL; R6; 18	SYM; R7; 15	SYM; R8; 16	PHI; R9; 13	PHI; R10; 22	BAR; R11; 14	BAR; R12; 13	WIN; R13; 17	WIN; R14; 19	HID; R15; Ret	HID; R16; 17	TOW; R17; 15	TOW; R18; 7	QLD; R19; 13	QLD; R20; 15	BEN; R21; 18	BEN; R22; 18	PUK; R23; 23	PUK; R24; 10	BAT; R25; 11	SUR; R26; 16	SUR; R27; Ret	SAN; QR; 16	SAN; R28; Ret	NEW; R29; 22	NEW; R30; 20							20th	1521
2020	Team 18	18	Holden ZB Commodore	ADE; R1	ADE; R2	MEL; R3; C	MEL; R4; C	MEL; R5; C	MEL; R6; C	SMP1; R7	SMP1; R8	SMP1; R9	SMP2; R10	SMP2; R11	SMP2; R12	HID1; R13	HID1; R14	HID1; R15	HID2; R16	HID2; R17	HID2; R18	TOW1; R19	TOW1; R20	TOW1; R21	TOW2; R22	TOW2; R23	TOW2; R24	BEN1; R25	BEN1; R26	BEN1; R27	BEN2; R28; PO	BEN2; R29; PO	BEN2; R30; PO	BAT; R31; 8							33rd	180
2021	Team 18	20	Holden ZB Commodore	BAT1; R1	BAT1; R2	SAN; R3	SAN; R4	SAN; R5	SYM; R6	SYM; R7	SYM; R8	BEN; R9	BEN; R10	BEN; R11	HID; R12	HID; R13	HID; R14	TOW1; R15	TOW1; R16	TOW2; R17	TOW2; R18	TOW2; R19	SMP1; R20	SMP1; R21	SMP1; R22	SMP2; R23	SMP2; R24	SMP2; R25	SMP3; R26	SMP3; R27	SMP3; R28	SMP4; R29; PO	SMP4; R30; PO	BAT2; R31; Ret							NC	0
2022	PremiAir Racing	31	Holden ZB Commodore	SYD; R1	SYD; R2	SYM; R6	SYM; R7	SYM; R8	MEL; R6	MEL; R7	MEL; R8	MEL; R9	WAN; R10	WAN; R11	WAN; R12	WIN; R13	WIN; R14	WIN; R15	HID; R16	HID; R17	HID; R18	TOW; R19; 23	TOW; R20; 21	BEN; R21; 19	BEN; R22; 23	BEN; R23; 14	SAN; R24; 13	SAN; R25; 9	SAN; R26; 19	PUK; R27; 17	PUK; R28; 10	PUK; R29; 11	BAT; R30; 12	SUR; R31; 19	SUR; R32; Ret	ADE; R33; Ret	ADE; R34; 10				25th	708
2023	PremiAir Racing	31	Chevrolet Camaro ZL1	NEW; R1; 18	NEW; R2; 4	MEL; R3; 22	MEL; R4; 21	MEL; R5; 19	MEL; R6; 16	BAR; R7; 14	BAR; R8; 11	BAR; R9; 11	SYM; R10; 14	SYM; R11; 9	SYM; R12; 16	HID; R13; 14	HID; R14; 6	HID; R15; 20	TOW; R16; 20	TOW; R17; 12	SMP; R18; 12	SMP; R19; 16	BEN; R20; 14	BEN; R21; 23	BEN; R22; 15	SAN; R23; 15	BAT; R24; 10	SUR; R25; 17	SUR; R26; 6	ADE; R27; 13	ADE; R28; 20										16th	1569
2024	PremiAir Racing	31	Chevrolet Camaro ZL1	BAT1; R1; 18	BAT1; R2; 5	MEL; R3; 23	MEL; R4; 16	MEL; R5; 12	MEL; R6; 11	TAU; R7; 7	TAU; R8; 5	BAR; R9; 14	BAR; R10; 16	**HID**; **R11**; **4**	HID; R12; 4	TOW; R13; 16	TOW; R14; 10	SMP; R15; 14	SMP; R16; 9	SYM; R17; 14	SYM; R18; 13	SAN; R19; 3	BAT2; R20; 6	SUR; R21; 16	SUR; R22; 13	ADE; R23; 15	ADE; R24; 8														7th	1991
2025	PremiAir Racing	31	Chevrolet Camaro ZL1	SYD; R1; 22	SYD; R2; 9	SYD; R3; 8	MEL; R4; 23	MEL; R5; 13	MEL; R6; 23	MEL; R7; C	TAU; R8; 9	TAU; R9; 18	TAU; R10; 10	SYM; R11; 8	SYM; R12; 6	SYM; R13; 4	BAR; R14; 13	BAR; R15; 14	BAR; R16; 22	HID; R17; 16	HID; R18; 15	HID; R19; 20	TOW; R20; 18	TOW; R21; Ret	TOW; R22; 13	QLD; R23; 14	QLD; R24; 14	QLD; R25; 9	BEN; R26; 25	BAT; R27; 3	SUR; R28; 12	SUR; R29; 17	SAN; R30; 10	SAN; R31; 20	ADE; R32; 15	ADE; R33; 14	ADE; R34; 17				14th	1458
2026	Blanchard Racing Team	7	Ford Mustang S650	**SMP**; **R1**; **3**	SMP; R2; 10	SMP; R3; 24	MEL; R4; 4	MEL; R5; 13	MEL; R6; 19	MEL; R7; 5	TAU; R8; 6	TAU; R9; 7	CHR; R10; 6	CHR; R11; 15	CHR; R12; 3	CHR; R13; 4	SYM; R14; 13	SYM; R15; 12	SYM; R16; 13	HID; R17; 18	HID; R18; 11	HID; R19; 14	TOW; R20; 12	TOW; R21; 22	TOW; R22; 17	BAR; R23; 15	BAR; R24; 15	BAR; R25; 14	QLD; R26; 11	QLD; R27; 21	QLD; R28; 5	BEN; R28; DSQ	BAT; R30	SUR; R31	SUR; R32	SAN; R33	SAN; R34	ADE; R35	ADE; R36	ADE; R37	14th*	1226*

=== Bathurst 1000 results ===
Year	Team	Car	Co-driver	Position	Laps
2016	Garry Rogers Motorsport	Volvo S60	(Australia) James Moffat	DNF	108
2017	Garry Rogers Motorsport	Holden Commodore VF	(Australia) Garth Tander	18th	152
2018	Garry Rogers Motorsport	Holden Commodore ZB	(Australia) Richard Muscat	8th	161
2019	Garry Rogers Motorsport	Holden Commodore ZB	(Australia) Richard Muscat	11th	161
2020	Charlie Schwerkolt Racing	Holden Commodore ZB	(Australia) Mark Winterbottom	8th	161
2021	Charlie Schwerkolt Racing	Holden Commodore ZB	(Australia) Scott Pye	DNF	6
2022	PremiAir Racing	Holden Commodore ZB	(Australia) Dylan O'Keeffe	12th	161
2023	PremiAir Racing	Chevrolet Camaro Mk.6	(Australia) Dylan O'Keeffe	10th	161
2024	PremiAir Racing	Chevrolet Camaro Mk.6	(Australia) David Russell	6th	161
2025	PremiAir Racing	Chevrolet Camaro Mk.6	(Australia) David Russell	**3rd**	161
2026	Blanchard Racing Team	Ford Mustang S650	(New Zealand) Richie Stanaway		

=== Bathurst 12 Hour results ===
Year	Team	Co-drivers	Car	Class	Laps	Position	Class pos.
2023	(Australia) PremiAir Racing	(Australia) Brad Schumacher (Belgium) Frédéric Vervisch	Audi R8 LMS Evo II	Pro-Am	243	DNF	
2026	(Australia) Team BRM	(Australia) Steve Brooks (Australia) Alex Peroni (Australia) Mark Rosser	Audi R8 LMS Evo II	Pro-Am	148	DNF	

=== Complete S5000 results ===
Year	Series	Team	1	2	3	4	5	6	7	8	9	10	11	12	13	14	15	16	17	18	Position	Points
2019	Exhibition	Garry Rogers Motorsport	SAN; R1; 3	SAN; R2; 1	SAN; M 1	BMP; R1; 4	BMP; R2; 2	BMP; M Ret													N/C	-
2020	Australian	Garry Rogers Motorsport	APC; R1; PO	APC; R2; PO	SMP; R3; C	SMP; R4; C	WIN; R5; C	WIN; R6; C	BMP; R7; C	BMP; R8; C	PHI; R9; C	PHI; R10; C	SAN; R11; C	SAN; R12; C							N/C	-
2021	Australian	Garry Rogers Motorsport	SYM; R1; 3	SYM; R2; 5	SYM; R3; Ret	PHI; R4; **4**	PHI; R5; 6	PHI; R6; 2	SAN; R7; 1	SAN; R8; Ret	SAN; R9; 4	SMP; R10; 1	SMP; R11; 4	SMP; R12; 1							4th	344
2021	Tasman	Garry Rogers Motorsport	SMP; R1; 3	SMP; R2; 8	SMP; R3; 6	BAT; R4; 1	BAT; R5; 5	BAT; R6; 1	BAT; R7; C												3rd	136
2022	Australian	Garry Rogers Motorsport	SYM; R1; **2**	SYM; R2; 3	SYM; R3; 5	PHI; R4; **1**	PHI; R5; 5	PHI; R6; 2	MEL; R7; 8	MEL; R8; 7	MEL; R9; 5	SMP; R10; Ret	SMP; R11; 2	SMP; R12; 3	HID; R13; 7	HID; R14; 2	HID; R15; 4				2nd	375
2023	Australian	Garry Rogers Motorsport	SYM; R1; 5	SYM; R2; 2	SYM; R3; 3	PHI; R4; 3	PHI; R5; 2	PHI; R6; 3	WIN; R7; **7**	WIN; R8; 2	WIN; R9; 2	SMP; R10	SMP; R11	SMP; R12	BEN; R13	BEN; R14	BEN; R15	ADL; R16	ADL; R17	ADL; R18	7th	282

=== Australian TransAm Series results ===
Year	Car	1	2	3	4	5	6	7	8	9	10	11	12	13	14	15	16	17	18	19	20	21	22	23	Position	Points
2024	Ford Mustang	**SAN**; **R1**; **2**	SAN; R2; 14	SAN; R3; 10	SYM; R1; 5	SYM; R2; 3	SYM; R3; 1	SYM; R4; 1	**PHI**; **R1**; **2**	PHI; R2; 3	PHI; R3; 1	BEN; R1; 14	BEN; R2; 5	BEN; R3; 4	BEN; R4; 3	QLD; R1; 4	QLD; R2; 4	QLD; R3; 20	QLD; R4; 6	**BAT**; **R1**; **1**	BAT; R2; 1	ADE; R1	ADE; R2	ADE; R3	4th	646
2025	Ford Mustang	SYM; R1; 4	SYM; R2; 2	SYM; R3; 14	SYM; R4; 24	**BAT**; **R1**; **1**	BAT; R2; 4	HID; R1	HID; R2	HID; R3	**SAN**; **R1**; **1**	SAN; R2; 2	SAN; R3; 1	BEN; R1	BEN; R2	BEN; R3	MAL; R1; 3	MAL; R2; 2	MAL; R3; 1	ADE; R1	ADE; R2	ADE; R3			3rd	346
2026	Ford Mustang	BAT; R1; 4	BAT; R2; 5	BAT; R3; 2	HID; R1	HID; R2	HID; R3	WAN; R1	WAN; R2	WAN; R3	QLD; R1	QLD; R2	QLD; R3	BEN; R1	BEN; R2	BEN; R3	SAN; R1	SAN; R2	SAN; R3	SAN; R4	SAN; R5	SAN; R6			15th*	61*
