= 2015 Australian Formula 4 Championship =

Motor racing competition

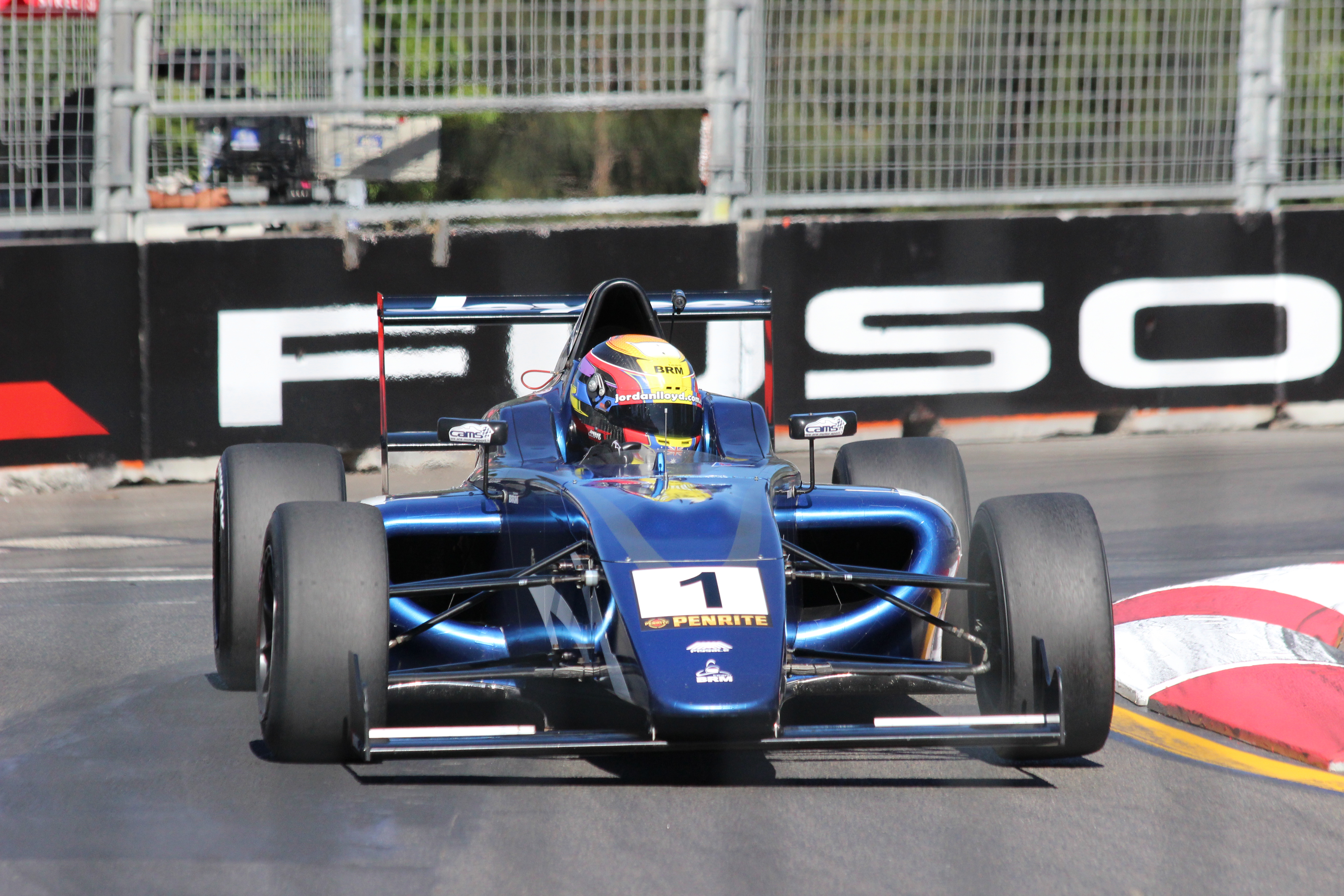
Jordan Lloyd secured the drivers' championship with one event remaining, running the number 1 at the final event in celebration.

The 2015 CAMS Jayco Australian Formula 4 Championship was an Australian motor racing competition for Formula 4 cars. It was the inaugural Australian F4 Championship. It commenced on 10 July at the Townsville Street Circuit and ended on 6 December at the Homebush Street Circuit after seven events comprising three races each.

The championship, which was organised by the Confederation of Australian Motor Sport and certified by the FIA, was won by Jordan Lloyd.

== Teams and drivers ==
The following Australian-registered teams and drivers contested the championship.

Team	No.	Drivers	Events
Team BRM	1	Jordan Lloyd	7
Team BRM	94	Jordan Lloyd	1–6
Team BRM	2	Francesco Maiolo	All
Team BRM	3	Zane Goddard	1–5
Team BRM	93	Zane Goddard	6–7
Team BRM	4	Drew Ridge	1–3
Team BRM	26	Harry Hayek	All
AGI Sport	14	Nicholas Rowe	1
AGI Sport	97	Nicholas Rowe	2–3, 7
AGI Sport	15	Tom Grech	All
AGI Sport	25	Jimmy Vernon	All
AGI Sport	77	Nick Filipetto	7
AGI Sport	79	Jordan Love	1–4
AGI Sport	99	Will Brown	All
AGI Sport	20	Jack Sipp	1–2
AGI Sport	20	Caitlin Wood	4
Dream Motorsport	20	Caitlin Wood	6–7
Dream Motorsport	49	Thomas Randle	All
Dream Motorsport	96	Luis Leeds	All
Jordan McGregor Motorsport	44	Jordan McGregor	5

All cars comprised a mandatory Mygale M14-F4 chassis powered by a 1.6-litre turbocharged Ford EcoBoost engine.

== Race calendar and results ==
The calendar was published on 1 December 2014. All events were held in Australia and were contested at V8 Supercar events.

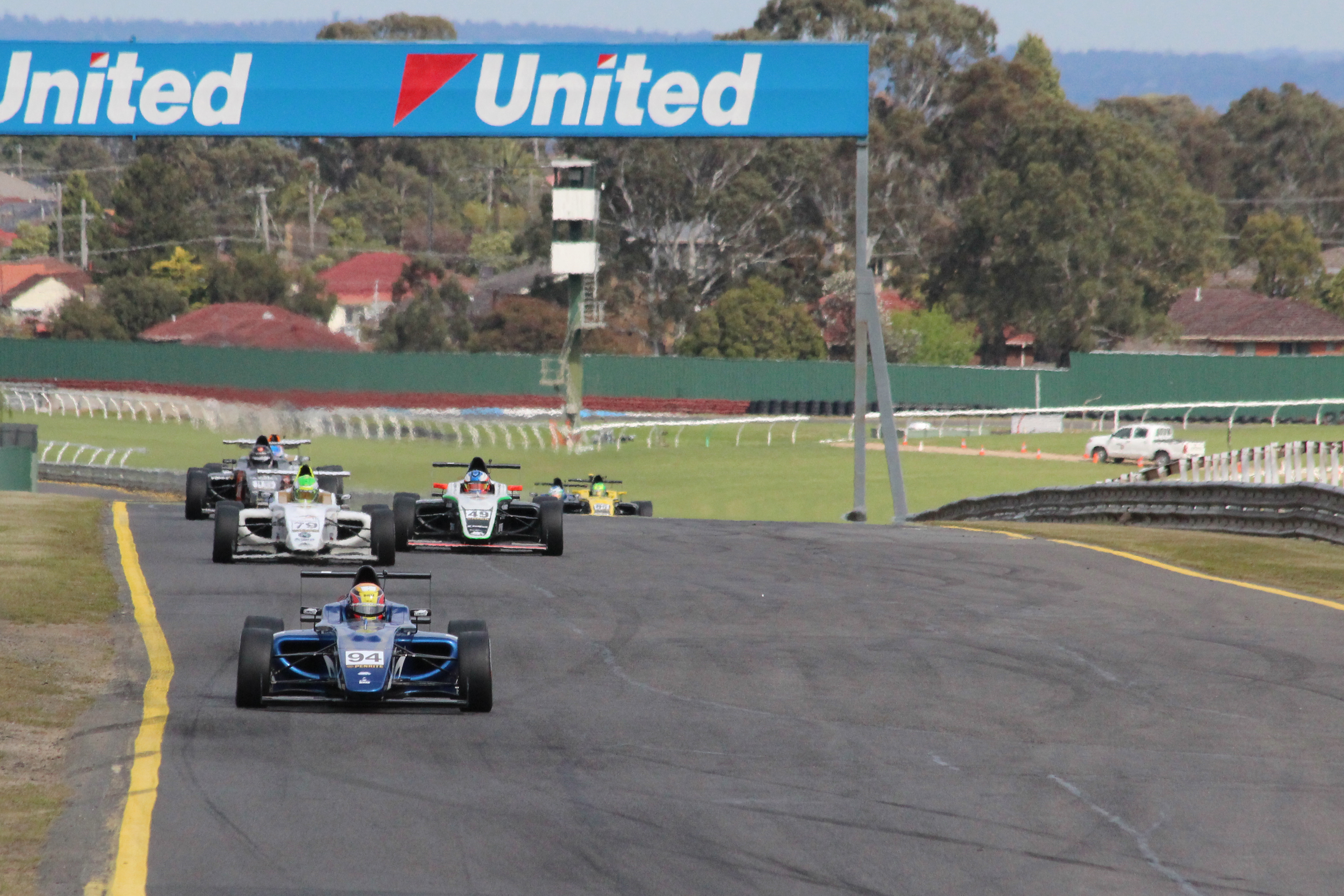
Jordan Lloyd leads the field on the first lap of Race 2 of Event 4 at Sandown Raceway.

Event		Circuit	Date	Pole position	Fastest lap	Winning driver	Winning team
1	R1	Townsville Street Circuit, Townsville	11 July	Jordan Lloyd	Will Brown	Will Brown	AGI Sport
1	R2	Townsville Street Circuit, Townsville	11 July		Jimmy Vernon	Jordan Lloyd	Team BRM
1	R3	Townsville Street Circuit, Townsville	12 July	Will Brown	Jordan Lloyd	Jordan Lloyd	Team BRM
2	R4	Queensland Raceway, Ipswich	1 August	Thomas Randle	Jordan Lloyd	Jordan Lloyd	Team BRM
2	R5	Queensland Raceway, Ipswich	2 August		Thomas Randle	Thomas Randle	Dream Motorsport
2	R6	Queensland Raceway, Ipswich	2 August	Thomas Randle	Jordan Lloyd	Jordan Lloyd	Team BRM
3	R7	Sydney Motorsport Park, Sydney	22 August	Thomas Randle	Jordan Lloyd	Jordan Lloyd	Team BRM
3	R8	Sydney Motorsport Park, Sydney	23 August		Nick Rowe	Nick Rowe	AGI Sport
3	R9	Sydney Motorsport Park, Sydney	23 August	Thomas Randle	Jordan Lloyd	Jordan Lloyd	Team BRM
4	R10	Sandown Raceway, Melbourne	12 September	Jordan Lloyd	Jordan Lloyd	Jordan Lloyd	Team BRM
4	R11	Sandown Raceway, Melbourne	12 September		Jordan Lloyd	Jordan Lloyd	Team BRM
4	R12	Sandown Raceway, Melbourne	13 September	Jordan Lloyd	Jordan Lloyd	Jordan Lloyd	Team BRM
5	R13	Surfers Paradise Street Circuit, Surfers Paradise	24 October	Thomas Randle	Luis Leeds	Thomas Randle	Dream Motorsport
5	R14	Surfers Paradise Street Circuit, Surfers Paradise	24 October		Thomas Randle	Thomas Randle	Dream Motorsport
5	R15	Surfers Paradise Street Circuit, Surfers Paradise	25 October	Thomas Randle	Thomas Randle	Thomas Randle	Dream Motorsport
6	R16	Phillip Island Grand Prix Circuit, Phillip Island	21 November	Jordan Lloyd	Jordan Lloyd	Jordan Lloyd	Team BRM
6	R17	Phillip Island Grand Prix Circuit, Phillip Island	21 November		Jordan Lloyd	Jordan Lloyd	Team BRM
6	R18	Phillip Island Grand Prix Circuit, Phillip Island	22 November	Jordan Lloyd	Jordan Lloyd	Jordan Lloyd	Team BRM
7	R19	Homebush Street Circuit, Sydney	5 December	Thomas Randle	Thomas Randle	Thomas Randle	Dream Motorsport
7	R20	Homebush Street Circuit, Sydney	6 December		Nick Rowe	Thomas Randle	Dream Motorsport
7	R21	Homebush Street Circuit, Sydney	6 December	Thomas Randle	Thomas Randle	Thomas Randle	Dream Motorsport

== Points system ==
Points were awarded to the top 10 classified finishers in each race. Five points were awarded to the driver with the fastest time in qualifying. One point was awarded for fastest lap.

Position	1st	2nd	3rd	4th	5th	6th	7th	8th	9th	10th	R1 PP	FL
Points	25	18	15	12	10	8	6	4	2	1	5	1

== Championship standings ==
Pos	Driver	TOW			QLD			SMP			SAN			SUR			PHI			SYD			Pts.
1	Jordan Lloyd	**10**	1	1	1	2	1	1	9	1	**1**	1	**1**	2	2	3	**1**	1	**1**	5	3	2	441
2	Thomas Randle	5	9	6	**2**	1	**2**	**2**	2	**2**	2	2	4	**1**	1	**1**	3	9	4	**1**	1	**1**	386
3	Will Brown	1	4	**8**	Ret	8	4	8	3	3	8	Ret	5	7	5	4	2	3	6	2	6	3	216
4	Harry Hayek	6	3	4	3	4	3	7	6	8	Ret	5	6	6	6	5	4	5	5	4	2	7	207
5	Jimmy Vernon	4	Ret	3	5	6	8	4	11	7	3	8	3	3	3	10	5	2	7	6	4	5	197
6	Luis Leeds	3	6	Ret	4	3	6	3	4	10	9	6	2	5	4	2	10	4	3	Ret	Ret	Ret	183
7	Nick Rowe	2	2	5	6	7	7	5	1	4										3	5	Ret	140
8	Tom Grech	DNS	Ret	11	7	5	5	10	5	9	7	4	7	4	Ret	8	9	6	Ret	Ret	DNS	DNS	89
9	Zane Goddard	8	Ret	10	10	11	10	6	7	5	Ret	7	Ret	8	Ret	6	6	Ret	2	Ret	7	Ret	81
10	Francesco Maiolo	9	Ret	12	9	12	11	Ret	12	12	5	10	9	9	7	7	7	7	8	7	9	4	67
11	Jordan Love	Ret	7	7	8	9	9	9	10	6	4	3	8										62
12	Drew Ridge	7	5	2	11	10	12	11	8	11													39
13	Caitlin Wood										6	9	10				8	8	9	8	8	8	33
14	Nick Filipetto																			Ret	10	6	9
15	Jordan McGregor^{2}													10	8	9							7
16	Jack Sipp	11	8	9	12	13	13																6
Pos	Driver	TOW			QLD			SMP			SAN			SUR			PHI			SYD			Pts.

Colour	Result
Gold	Winner
Silver	Second place
Bronze	Third place
Green	Points classification
Blue	Non-points classification
Blue	Non-classified finish (NC)
Purple	Retired, not classified (Ret)
Red	Did not qualify (DNQ)
Red	Did not pre-qualify (DNPQ)
Black	Disqualified (DSQ)
White	Did not start (DNS)
White	Withdrew (WD)
White	Race cancelled (C)
Blank	Did not practice (DNP)
Blank	Did not arrive (DNA)
Blank	Excluded (EX)

Bold – Pole
Italics – Fastest lap

Notes:

- **^1** Randle is listed as scoring 386 points on the official championship points table.
- **^2** McGregor is not listed on the official championship points table.
