= Thomas Randle =

Australian racing driver

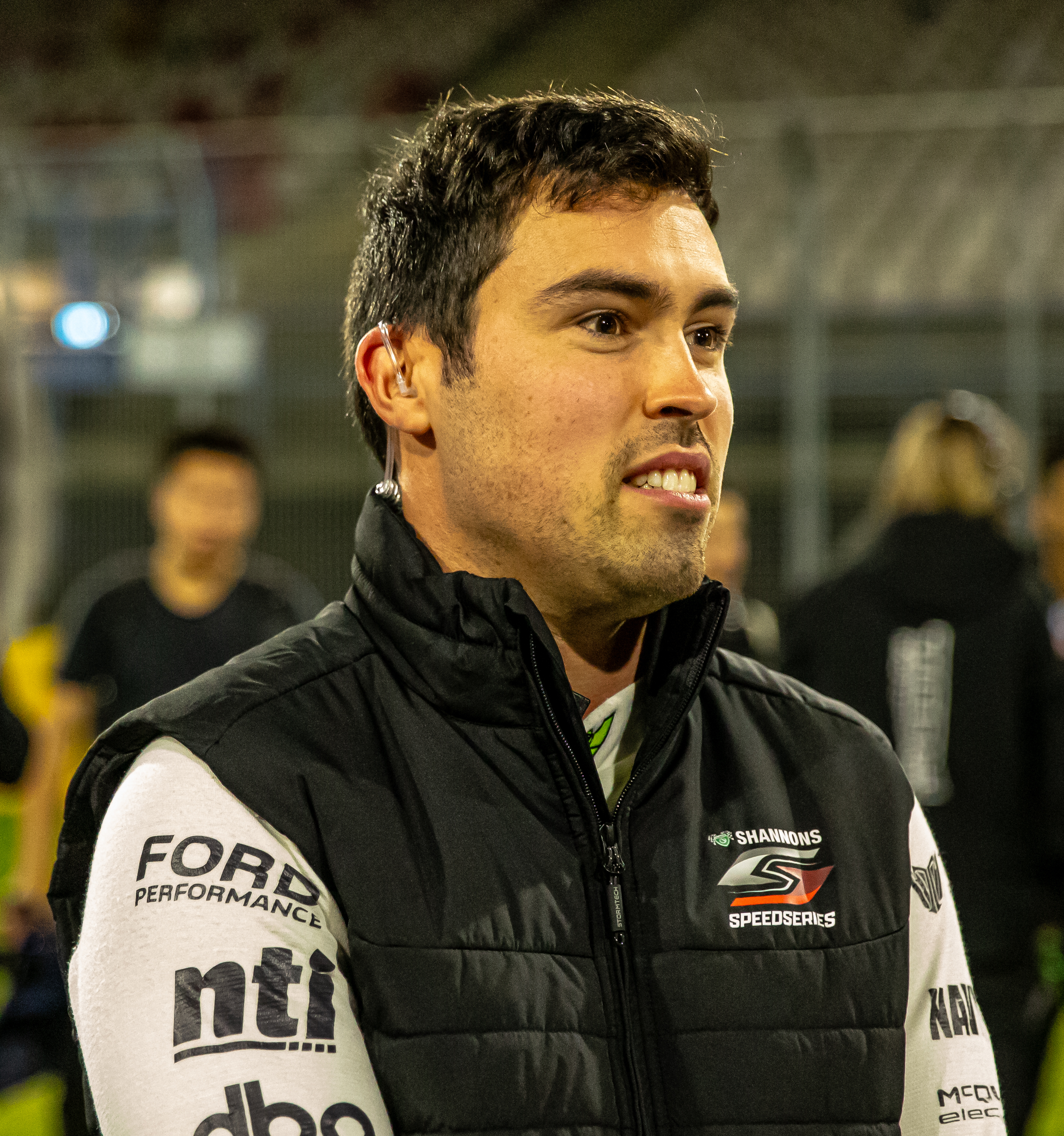
- Randle at Sydney Motorsport Park in 2025
- Nationality: (Australia) Australian
- Born: 7 April 1996 (age 30) Melbourne, Victoria, Australia

Supercars Championship career
- Debut season: 2019
- Current team: Tickford Racing
- Categorisation: FIA Silver (until 2023); FIA Gold (2024–)
- Car number: 55
- Former teams: Brad Jones Racing
- Starts: 161
- Wins: 0
- Podiums: 11
- Poles: 3
- Best finish: 5th in 2024

Previous series
- 2021 2018–2020 2015–17 2016 2016 2015 2014–24 2013–14 2010-12: Australian S5000 Championship; Dunlop Super2 Series; Toyota Racing Series; Formula V8 3.5 Series; BRDC British Formula 3 Championship; Australian Formula 4 Championship; Australian Sports Sedan Championship; Australian Formula Ford Series; Karting

Championship titles
- 2020 2017 2014 2012 2012: Dunlop Super2 Series; Toyota Racing Series; Australian Formula Ford Series; Australian Karting - Jnr Clubman; Australian Rotax - Jnr Rotax

Awards
- 2018 2020 2023: Mike Kable Young Gun Award; The BRDC Innes Ireland Trophy; Peter Brock Medal

Thomas Randle (born 7 April 1996) is an Australian racing driver. He currently races in the Supercars Championship for Tickford Racing in the No. 55 Castrol Racing Ford Mustang GT. Randle won the 2014 Australian Formula Ford Series, 2017 Toyota Racing Series, and 2020 Super2 Series. In 2018, he was awarded the Mike Kable Young Gun Award, The BRDC Innes Ireland Trophy in 2020, and the Peter Brock Medal in 2023.

== Career ==
=== Karting ===
Prior to his single-seater career, Randle enjoyed a successful period in karting in his native Australia. In 2012, he won Junior Clubman class of the Australian National Sprint Kart Championship and Rotax Junior class of the Australian Rotax Nationals.

=== Formula Ford and Formula 4 ===
Randle made his single-seater debut in 2013, racing in the Australian Formula Ford Championship for the Evans Motorsport Group. He finished seventh with two podiums and another thirteen point-scoring finishes. He switched to Dream Motorsport in 2014. He clinched the championship title, winning five races with just four-point advantage to Jordan Lloyd.

Randle continued his collaboration with Dream Motorsport into the new-for-2015 Australian Formula 4 Championship. He again battled with Lloyd for the championship, but this time he finished as runner-up and was outscored by 54 points and five wins.

=== Formula 3 ===
For 2016, Randle moved to Europe to compete in the BRDC British Formula 3 Championship, racing for Douglas Motorsport. He won races at Rockingham and Spa and finished fourth in the drivers' standings.

=== Formula V8 3.5 ===
In 2016, Randle made his debut in Formula V8 3.5 in the Jerez round with Comtec Racing.

=== Eurocup Formula Renault 2.0 ===
In 2017, Randle switched to the Eurocup Formula Renault 2.0, partaking with AVF by Adrián Vallés. He finished nine of his 16 races in points (his best finish was the fourth place at Red Bull Ring). He ended season fourteenth.

=== Super2 Series ===
In 2018, Randle moved to the Dunlop Super2 Series to race with Tickford Racing in a Ford FG X Falcon. Randle joined the company as champion of the 2020 Dunlop Super2 Series.

=== S5000 Championship ===
In 2021, Randle left the Super2 Series, and moved to the Australian S5000 Championship to race with Team BRM in a Onroak Ligier JS F3-S5000. after he couldn't find a ride for 2021 Super2 season.

=== Supercars Championship ===
Randle commenced full-time driving in the Supercars Championship in 2022 for Castrol Racing, and finished his rookie seasons sitting 21st in the Drivers Championship.

In 2023, Randle recorded his first Supercars podium finish at The Bend in Race 20 (third place), and a day later recorded his first ever pole position (Race 21) which he converted to second place. He finished up with four podiums in 2023.

== Personal life ==
Randle was diagnosed with testicular cancer in January 2020.

Randle has a business called Dream Simulation which helps drivers to hone their skills in all types of racing categories.

Randle plays volleyball and plays piano in his spare time.

In 2025, Randle was on the ABC television show The Piano as a contestant.

Randle is a university student studying Mechanical Engineering.

== Career results ==
=== Karting career summary ===
Season	Series	Position
2010	Australian National Sprint Kart Championship - Junior National Heavy	22nd
2010	Victorian Open Kart Titles - Junior National Light	12th
2010	New South Wales Kart Titles - Junior National Light	4th
2010	South Australia Kart Titles - Junior Clubman	**2nd**
2011	Australian National Sprint Kart Championship - Junior National Heavy	12th
2011	Australian National Sprint Kart Championship - Junior Clubman	12th
2011	Oakleigh Kart Club Top Guns - Junior National Light	5th
2012	Australian National Sprint Kart Championship - Junior Clubman	**1st**
2012	Australian Rotax Nationals - Junior Rotax	**1st**
2012	RMC Grand Finals - Junior Max	41st

=== Circuit career summary ===
Season	Series	Team	Races	Wins	Poles	F/laps	Podiums	Points	Position
2013	Australian Formula Ford Championship	Evans Motorsport Group	18	0	0	0	2	131	7th
2013	Victorian State Circuit Racing Formula Ford Fiesta Championship	Evans Motorsport Group	10	1	2	2	5	184	7th
2013	Morgan Park Raceway Production Sports 1 Hour		1	0	0	0	0	N/A	NC
2014	Australian Formula Ford Series	Dream Motorsport	18	5	2	3	12	266	**1st**
2014	Victorian State Circuit Racing Formula Ford Fiesta Championship	Dream Motorsport	10	3	1	3	3	100	10th
2014	New South Wales Formula Ford Fiesta Championship	Dream Motorsport	3	2	1	2	2	63	12th
2014	Winton 400 Sports Sedan support event	Dream Motorsport	3	0	1	2	1	39	14th
2014	Kerrick Sports Sedan Series		3	1	0	1	1	N/A	NC
2015	Australian Formula 4 Championship	Dream Motorsport	21	7	7	5	15	386	**2nd**
2015	Kerrick Sports Sedan Series	Dream Motorsport	15	2	1	4	10	514	**3rd**
2015	Toyota Racing Series	ETEC Motorsport	16	0	0	1	2	518	10th
2016	BRDC British Formula 3 Championship	Douglas Motorsport	23	2	1	0	7	424	4th
2016	Toyota Racing Series	Victory Motor Racing	3	0	0	0	0	93	20th
2016	Masters of Formula 3	Double R Racing	1	0	0	0	0	N/A	11th
2016	Formula V8 3.5 Series	Comtec Racing	4	0	0	0	0	0	20th
2017	Formula Renault Eurocup	AVF by Adrián Vallés	15	0	0	0	0	39.5	14th
2017	Formula Renault 2.0 NEC	AVF by Adrián Vallés	3	0	0	0	0	0	NC†
2017	Toyota Racing Series	Victory Motor Racing	15	2	3	7	7	855	**1st**
2017	British LMP3 Cup	Douglas Motorsport	6	0	0	3	1	73	5th
2017	Kumho Tyre Australian V8 Touring Car Series	Dream Motorsport	3	0	0	0	0	87	18th
2018	Super2 Series	Tickford Racing	14	0	1	0	2	915	11th
2018	National Sports Sedan Series	Dream Motorsport	11	7	2	7	9	428	**2nd**
2019	Super2 Series	Tickford Racing	14	2	2	2	5	1396	**3rd**
2019	Supercars Championship	Tickford Racing	7	0	0	0	1	732	26th
2019	Australian Touring Car Masters	Skye Sands	3	1	0	2	2	76	9th
2020	Super2 Series	MW Motorsport	7	3	3	0	4	860	**1st**
2020	Supercars Championship	Brad Jones Racing	1	0	0	0	0	102	43rd
2021	S5000 Championship	Team BRM	12	1	1	3	6	346	**2nd**
2021	Supercars Championship	Tickford Racing	10	0	0	0	0	556	25th
2022	Supercars Championship	Tickford Racing	29	0	0	0	0	1156	23rd
2023	Supercars Championship	Tickford Racing	28	0	1	0	4	1700	13th
2024	Supercars Championship	Tickford Racing	24	0	1	2	3	2032	5th
2024	Intercontinental GT Challenge	Scott Taylor Motorsport	1	0	0	0	0	8	20th
2024	National Sports Sedan Series	Castrol Racing	4	3	0	4	3	135	10th
2025	Supercars Championship	Tickford Racing	33	0	1	0	2	4146	7th
2025	Intercontinental GT Challenge	Scott Taylor Motorsport	1	0	0	0	0	0	NC
2025	GT World Challenge Australia - Pro-Am	Geyer Valmont Racing	2	0	0	0	1	20	20th
2026	GT World Challenge Australia - Pro-Am	Castrol Team BRM	4	0	0	1	3	50	13th

^{†} As Randle was a guest driver, he was ineligible for points. ^{*} Season still in progress.

=== Complete Toyota Racing Series results ===
(key) (Races in bold indicate pole position) (Races in italics indicate fastest lap)

Year	Team	1	2	3	4	5	6	7	8	9	10	11	12	13	14	15	16	DC	Points
2015	ETEC Motorsport	RUA; 1; 3	RUA; 2; 14	RUA; 3; 6	TER; 1; 11	TER; 2; 8	TER; 3; 8	HMP; 1 Ret	HMP; 2; 8	HMP; 3; 7	TAU; 1; 4	TAU; 2; 3	TAU; 3 Ret	TAU; 4; 9	MAN; 1; 19	MAN; 2 Ret	MAN; 3; 9	10th	518
2016	Victory Motor Racing	RUA; 1	RUA; 2	RUA; 3	TER; 1	TER; 2	TER; 3	HMP; 1	HMP; 2	HMP; 3	TAU; 1	TAU; 2	TAU; 3	MAN; 1; 12	MAN; 2; 20	MAN; 3; 5		20th	89
2017	Victory Motor Racing	RUA; 1; 4	RUA; 2; 1	RUA; 3; 5	**TER**; **1**; 7	TER; 2; 3	TER; 3; 3	**HMP**; **1**; 3	HMP; 2; 7	**HMP**; **3**; 1	TAU; 1; 4	TAU; 2; 2	TAU; 3; 4	MAN; 1; 5	MAN; 2; 4	MAN; 3; 3		1st	855

=== Complete New Zealand Grand Prix results ===
Year	Team	Car	Qualifying	Main race
2015	(New Zealand) ETEC Motorsport	Tatuus FT-50 - Toyota	8th	9th
2016	(New Zealand) Victory Motor Racing	Tatuus FT-50 - Toyota	8th	5th
2017	(New Zealand) Victory Motor Racing	Tatuus FT-50 - Toyota	6th	**3rd**

=== Complete Australian Formula 4 Championship results ===
(key) (Races in bold indicate pole position) (Races in italics indicate fastest lap)

Year	Team	1	2	3	4	5	6	7	8	9	10	11	12	13	14	15	16	17	18	19	20	21	DC	Points
2015	Team BRM	TOW; 1; 5	TOW; 2; 9	TOW; 3; 6	**QLD**; **1**; 2	QLD; 2; 1	**QLD**; **3**; 2	**SMP**; **1**; 2	SMP; 2; 2	**SMP**; **3**; 2	SAN; 1; 2	SAN; 2; 2	SAN; 3; 4	**SUR**; **1**; 1	SUR; 2; 1	**SUR**; **3**; 1	PHI; 1; 3	PHI; 2; 9	PHI; 3; 4	**SYD**; **1**; 1	SYD; 2; 1	**SYD**; **3**; 1	2nd	386

=== Complete BRDC British Formula 3 Championship results ===
(key) (Races in bold indicate pole position; races in italics indicate fastest lap)

Year	Team	1	2	3	4	5	6	7	8	9	10	11	12	13	14	15	16	17	18	19	20	21	22	23	24	DC	Points
2016	Douglas Motorsport	SNE1; 1; 20	SNE1; 2; 9	SNE1; 3; 5	BRH; 1; 4	BRH; 2; 5	BRH; 3; 3	ROC; 1; 4	ROC; 2; 1	ROC; 3; 2	OUL; 1; 2	OUL; 2; 7	OUL; 3; 2	**SIL**; **1**; **2**	SIL; 2; 4	SIL; 3 C	SPA; 1; 9	SPA; 2; 1	SPA; 3; 5	SNE2; 1; 6	SNE2; 2; 4	SNE2; 3; 6	DON; 1 NC	DON; 2; 8	DON; 3; 3	4th	424

=== Complete Formula V8 3.5 Series results ===
(key) (Races in bold indicate pole position) (Races in italics indicate fastest lap)

Year	Team	1	2	3	4	5	6	7	8	9	10	11	12	13	14	15	16	17	18	Pos.	Points
2016	Comtec Racing	ALC; 1	ALC; 2	HUN; 1	HUN; 2	SPA; 1	SPA; 2	LEC; 1	LEC; 2	SIL; 1	SIL; 2	RBR; 1	RBR; 2	MNZ; 1	MNZ; 2	JER; 1 Ret	JER; 2; 13	CAT; 1 Ret	CAT; 2; 11	20th	0

=== Complete Formula Renault Eurocup results ===
(key) (Races in bold indicate pole position) (Races in italics indicate fastest lap)

Year	Team	1	2	3	4	5	6	7	8	9	10	11	12	13	14	15	16	17	18	19	20	21	22	23	Pos	Points
2017	AVF by Adrián Vallés	MNZ; 1	MNZ; 2	SIL; 1	SIL; 2	PAU; 1	PAU; 2	MON; 1	MON; 2	HUN; 1 Ret	HUN; 2; 13	HUN; 3; 10	NÜR; 1; 11	NÜR; 2; 9	RBR; 1; 4	RBR; 2; 6	LEC; 1; 9	LEC; 2; 10	SPA; 1; 10	SPA; 2; 5	SPA; 3; 11	CAT; 1 DSQ	CAT; 2 Ret	CAT; 3; 14	14th	39.5

=== Complete Formula Renault NEC results ===
(key) (Races in bold indicate pole position) (Races in italics indicate fastest lap)

Year	Entrant	1	2	3	4	5	6	7	8	9	10	11	DC	Points
2017	AVF by Adrián Vallés	MNZ; 1	MNZ; 2	ASS; 1	ASS; 2	NÜR; 1	NÜR; 2	SPA; 1; 10	SPA; 2; 5	SPA; 3; 11	HOC; 1	HOC; 2	NC†	0

† As Randle was a guest driver, he was ineligible for points

=== Super3 Series results ===
(key) (Races in bold indicate pole position) (Races in italics indicate fastest lap)

Year	Team	No.	Car	1	2	3	4	5	6	7	8	9	10	11	12	13	14	15	Position	Points
2017	Prodrive Racing Australia	9	Ford BA Falcon	PHI; R1	PHI; R2	PHI; R3	WIN; R4	WIN; R5	WIN; R6	QLD; R7; 5	QLD; R8; 5	QLD; R9; 4	PHI; R10	PHI; R11	PHI; R12	SMP; R13	SMP; R14	SMP; R15	15th	87

=== Super2 Series results ===
(key) (Round results only), (2020 Race results only)

Super2 Series results
Year	Team	No.	Car	1	2	3	4	5	6	7	8	9	10	11	12	13	14	15	16	Position	Points
2018	Tickford Racing	5	Ford FG X Falcon	ADE; R1; Ret	ADE; R2; DNS	ADE; R3; DNS	SYM; R4; 10	SYM; R5; 12	SYM; R6; 8	BAR; R7; 6	**BAR**; **R8**; 2	BAR; R9; 6	TOW; R10; 4	TOW; R11; 20	SAN; R12; 3	SAN; R13; 8	BAT; R14; 8	NEW; R15; Ret	NEW; R16; DNS	11th	915
2019	Tickford Racing	5	Ford FG X Falcon	ADE; R1; Ret	ADE; R2; 9	ADE; R3; 4	BAR; R4; 5	BAR; R5; 7	TOW; R6; 13	TOW; R7; 15	**QLD**; **R8**; 1	QLD; R9; 2	BAT; R10; 1	SAN; R11; 11	SAN; R12; Ret	**NEW**; **13**; 2	NEW; 14; 3			3rd	1396
2020	MW Motorsport	16	Nissan Altima L33	**ADE**; **R1**; 2	ADE; R2; 2	ADE; R3; 1	**SYD**; **R4**; 2	**SYD**; **R5**; 1	BAT; R6; 2	BAT; R7; 1										1st	860

=== Supercars Championship results ===
Supercars results
Year	Team	No.	Car	1	2	3	4	5	6	7	8	9	10	11	12	13	14	15	16	17	18	19	20	21	22	23	24	25	26	27	28	29	30	31	32	33	34	35	36	37	Position	Points
2019	Tickford Racing	66	Ford Mustang S550	ADE; R1	ADE; R2	MEL; R3	MEL; R4	MEL; R5	MEL; R6	SYM; R7; PO	SYM; R8; PO	PHI; R9	PHI; R10	BAR; R11	BAR; R12	WIN; R13; PO	WIN; R14; PO	HID; R15	HID; R16	TOW; R17	TOW; R18	QLD; R19	QLD; R20	BEN; R21; 17	BEN; R22; 17	PUK; R23	PUK; R24														26th	732
2019	Tickford Racing	5	Ford Mustang S550																									BAT; R25; 9	SUR; R26; 6	SUR; R27; 6	SAN; QR; 5	SAN; R28; 3	NEW; R29	NEW; R30							26th	732
2020	Brad Jones Racing	8	Holden ZB Commodore	ADE; R1	ADE; R2	MEL; R3	MEL; R4	MEL; R5	MEL; R6	SMP1; R7	SMP1; R8	SMP1; R9	SMP2; R10	SMP2; R11	SMP2; R12	HID1; R13	HID1; R14	HID1; R15	HID2; R16	HID2; R17	HID2; R18	TOW1; R19	TOW1; R20	TOW1; R21	TOW2; R22	TOW2; R23	TOW2; R24	BEN1; R25	BEN1; R26	BEN1; R27	BEN2; R28	BEN2; R29; PO	BEN2; R30; PO	BAT; R31; 18							43rd	102
2021	Tickford Racing	55	Ford Mustang S550	BAT1; R1	BAT1; R2	SAN; R3	SAN; R4	SAN; R5	SYM; R6	SYM; R7	SYM; R8	BEN; R9; 17	BEN; R10; 8	BEN; R11; 15	HID; R12; 9	HID; R13; 25	HID; R14; 11	TOW1; R15	TOW1; R16	TOW2; R17	TOW2; R18	TOW2; R19	SMP1; R20	SMP1; R21	SMP1; R22	SMP2; R23; 22	SMP2; R24; 15	SMP2; R25; 16	SMP3; R26	SMP3; R27	SMP3; R28	SMP4; R29; PO	SMP4; R30; PO								25th	556
2021	Tickford Racing	44	Ford Mustang S550																															BAT2; R31; 7							25th	556
2022	Tickford Racing	55	Ford Mustang S550	SMP; R1; 20	SMP; R2; 14	SYM; R3; 22	SYM; R4; Ret	SYM; R5; 12	MEL; R6; 21	MEL; R7; 18	MEL; R8; 11	MEL; R9; 23	BAR; R10; 12	BAR; R11; 20	BAR; R12; 22	WIN; R13; 12	WIN; R14; 18	WIN; R15; 12	HID; R16; 19	HID; R17; Ret	HID; R18; 15	TOW; R19; 16	TOW; R20; 17	BEN; R21; 11	BEN; R22; Ret	BEN; R23; DNS	SAN; R24; 9	SAN; R25; 17	SAN; R26; 8	PUK; R27; 16	PUK; R28; 21	PUK; R29; 18	BAT; R30; Ret	SUR; R31; 11	SUR; R32; Ret	ADE; R33; 15	ADE; R34; 18				23rd	1156
2023	Tickford Racing	55	Ford Mustang S650	NEW; R1; 17	NEW; R2; 18	MEL; R3; 12	MEL; R4; 8	MEL; R5; 9	MEL; R6; 11	BAR; R7; 9	BAR; R8; 23	BAR; R9; Ret	SYM; R10; 10	SYM; R11; 22	SYM; R12; 14	HID; R13; 17	HID; R14; 10	HID; R15; 14	TOW; R16; 13	TOW; R17; 8	SMP; R18; 23	SMP; R19; 22	BEN; R20; 3	**BEN**; **R21**; **2**	BEN; R22; 3	SAN; R23; 25	BAT; R24; 12	SUR; R25; 4	SUR; R26; 7	ADE; R27; 3	ADE; R28; 10										13th	1700
2024	Tickford Racing	55	Ford Mustang S650	BAT1; R1; 14	BAT1; R2; 4	MEL; R3; 22	MEL; R4; 23	MEL; R5; 22	MEL; R6; 4	TAU; R7; 12	TAU; R8; 15	BAR; R9; 10	BAR; R10; 5	HID; R11; 24	HID; R12; 14	TOW; R13; 5	TOW; R14; 5	SMP; R15; 3	SMP; R16; 10	TAS; R17; 12	**TAS**; **R18**; **18**	SAN; R19; 13	BAT; R20; 11	SUR; R21; 2	SUR; R22; 5	ADE; R23; 5	ADE; R24; 3														5th	2032
2025	Tickford Racing	55	Ford Mustang S650	SYD; R1; 3	SYD; R2; 6	SYD; R3; 11	MEL; R4; 8	MEL; R5; 20	MEL; R6; 16	MEL; R7; C	TAU; R8; 22	TAU; R9; 6	TAU; R10; 5	**SYM**; **R11**; **2**	SYM; R12; 4	SYM; R13; 14	BAR; R14; 10	BAR; R15; 6	BAR; R16; 9	HID; R17; 13	HID; R18; 22	HID; R19; 19	TOW; R20; 13	TOW; R21; 21	TOW; R22; 8	QLD; R23; 10	QLD; R24; 19	QLD; R25; 14	BEN; R26; 9	BAT; R27; 11	SUR; R28; 9	SUR; R29; 7	SAN; R30; 16	SAN; R31; 13	ADE; R32; Ret	ADE; R33; 7	ADE; R34; 9				7th	4286
2026	Tickford Racing	55	Ford Mustang S650	SMP; R1; 9	SMP; R2; 13	SMP; R3; 8	MEL; R4; 12	MEL; R5; 8	MEL; R6; Ret	MEL; R7; 3	TAU; R8; 19	TAU; R9; 13	CHR; R10; 11	CHR; R11; 14	CHR; R12; 17	CHR; R13; 19	SYM; R14; 15	SYM; R15; 10	SYM; R16; 11	HID; R20; 15	HID; R21; 12	HID; R22; WD	TOW; R23; 6	TOW; R24; 5	TOW; R25; 11	BAR; R17; 9	BAR; R18; 10	BAR; R19; 10	QLD; R26	QLD; R27	QLD; R28	BEN; R28	BAT; R30	SUR; R31	SUR; R32	SAN; R33	SAN; R34	ADE; R35	ADE; R36	ADE; R37	12th*	976*

=== Complete Bathurst 1000 results ===
Year	Team	Car	Co-driver	Position	Laps
2019	Tickford Racing	Ford Mustang S550	(Australia) Lee Holdsworth	9th	161
2020	Brad Jones Racing	Holden Commodore ZB	(Australia) Nick Percat	18th	133
2021	Tickford Racing	Ford Mustang S550	(Australia) James Courtney	7th	161
2022	Tickford Racing	Ford Mustang S550	(Australia) Zak Best	DNF	0
2023	Tickford Racing	Ford Mustang S650	(Australia) Garry Jacobson	12th	161
2024	Tickford Racing	Ford Mustang S650	(Australia) Tyler Everingham	11th	161
2025	Tickford Racing	Ford Mustang S650	(Australia) James Moffat	11th	161

=== Complete S5000 results ===
Year	Team	1	2	3	4	5	6	7	8	9	10	11	12	13	14	Position	Points
2019	Team BRM	SAN; R1	SAN; R2	SAN; M	BMP; R1; 1	BMP; R2; 6	BMP; M 2									N/C	-
2020	Team BRM	APC; R1; PO	APC; R2; PO	SMP; R3; C	SMP; R4; C	WIN; R5; C	WIN; R6; C	BMP; R7; C	BMP; R8; C	PHI; R9; C	PHI; R10; C	SAN; R11; C	SAN; R12; C	BAT; NC1; C	BAT; NC2; C	N/C	-
2021	Team BRM	SYM; R1; **2**	SYM; R2; 6	SYM; R3; 1	PHI; R4; 2	PHI; R5; 2	PHI; R6; 4	SAN; R7; DNS	SAN; R8; 3	SAN; R9; 6	SMP; R10; 5	SMP; R11; 3	SMP; R12; 4			2nd	346

=== Complete GT World Challenge Australia results ===
(key) (Races in bold indicate pole position) (Races in italics indicate fastest lap)

Year	Team	Car	Class	1	2	3	4	5	6	7	8	9	10	11	12	Pos.	Points
2025	Tigani Motorsport	Audi R8 LMS Evo II	Pro-Am	PHI; 1	PHI; 2	SYD; 1; 2	SYD; 2; 9	QLD; 1	QLD; 2	SAN; 1	SAN; 2	BEN; 1	BEN; 2	HAM; 2	HAM; 2	20th	20
2026	Team BRM	Audi R8 LMS Evo II	Pro-Am	PHI; 1; 3	PHI; 2; 9	BEN; 1; 2	BEN; 2; 3	QLD; 1	QLD; 2	HID; 1	HID; 2	SYD; 1	SYD; 2	ADL; 1	ADL; 2	13th	50

=== Complete Bathurst 12 Hour results ===
Year	Team	Co-drivers	Car	Class	Laps	Overall position	Class position
2024	(Australia) Scott Taylor Motorsport	(Australia) Craig Lowndes (Australia) Cam Waters	Mercedes-AMG GT3 Evo	**P**	275	7th	7th
2025	(Australia) Scott Taylor Motorsport	(Australia) Craig Lowndes (Australia) Cam Waters	Mercedes-AMG GT3 Evo	**P**	35	DNF	
2026	(Australia) Scott Taylor Motorsport	(Australia) Cam Waters (Australia) Chaz Mostert	Mercedes-AMG GT3 Evo	**P**	238	DNF	

=== Complete Bathurst 6 Hour results ===
Year	Team	Co-drivers	Car	Class	Laps	Pos.	Class pos.
2023	(Australia) Yellow Pages Race For A Cure	(Australia) Ben Kavich (Australia) Michael Kavich	BMW M2 Competition	X	112	4th	4th
2024	(Australia) Race For A Cure	(Australia) Ben Kavich (Australia) Michael Kavich	BMW M2 Competition	X	123	**2nd**	**2nd**
2025	(Australia) Race For A Cure	(Australia) Ben Kavich	BMW M2 Competition	X	115	29th	8th
2026	(Australia) Race For A Cure	(Australia) Ben Kavich (Australia) Michael Kavich	BMW M2 Competition	X	114	**1st**	**1st**

Sporting positions
Preceded by Anton de Pasquale	Australian Formula Ford; Champion; 2014	Succeeded by Cameron Hill
Preceded by Lando Norris	Toyota Racing Series; Champion; 2017	Succeeded by Robert Shwartzman
Preceded by Bryce Fullwood	Super2 Series; Champion; 2020	Succeeded by Broc Feeney
Awards and achievements
Preceded by Will Brown	Mike Kable Young Gun Award; 2018	Succeeded by Tyler Everingham
Preceded by Sophia Flörsch	The BRDC Innes Ireland Trophy; 2020	Succeeded by Jeff Smith
Preceded by Toby Price	Peter Brock Medal; 2023	Succeeded by Brodie Kostecki
