= 2019 S5000 season =

Motor racing competition

The CAMS Australian S5000 Championship held two "launch events" or exhibition meetings in 2019, prior to the inaugural championship season in 2021. These meetings were held as part of the Shannons Nationals Motor Racing Championships, at Sandown Raceway on 21 and 22 September and The Bend Motorsport Park on 16 and 17 November.

== Teams and drivers ==
The following teams and drivers competed in the races. As the championship is a spec series, all competitors raced with an identical Onroak-Ligier chassis powered by a naturally-aspirated 5.0-litre Ford Coyote V8 engine.

Entrant	No.	Driver	Rounds	Ref.
AGI Sport	22	(New Zealand) Tom Alexander	1	
AGI Sport	24	(Australia) John Martin	All	
Australian Racing Enterprises	11	(Australia) Michael Gibson	All	
BW Motorsport	89	(Australia) Braydan Willmington	2	
Eggleston Motorsport	38	(Australia) Will Brown	All	
Garry Rogers Motorsport	31	(Australia) James Golding	All	
Milldun Motorsport	27	(Australia) Barton Mawer	1	
Modena Engineering	34	(Australia) Ricky Capo	All	
MTEC Motorsport	23	(Australia) Tim Macrow	All	
MTEC Motorsport	83	(Australia) Matthew Brabham	1	
MTEC Motorsport	97	(New Zealand) Taylor Cockerton	1	
Team BRM	8	(Australia) Alex Davison	1	
Team BRM	8	(United Kingdom) James Winslow	2	
Team BRM	33	(Australia) Tim Berryman	1	
Team BRM	49	(Australia) Thomas Randle	2	
Team BRM	99	(Australia) Anton de Pasquale	2	
Team BRM	111	(Brazil) Rubens Barrichello	1	

== Race calendar and meeting format ==
A provisional calendar had initially been announced in 2018, with Sydney Motorsport Park as the season opener and The Bend Motorsport Park as the concluding round. However, after the organisers announced that the series would be delayed four months due to supply issues as well as further S5000 car testing, the first race of the series was pushed back to 22 September, 2019 at Sandown Raceway.

Round	Circuit	Date
1	Sandown Raceway	21–22 September
2	The Bend Motorsport Park	16–17 November

At each meeting, a qualifying session, two qualifying heats and a Main Event were held. Meeting points were awarded to the fastest six qualifiers in qualifying. Drivers in the top 75% of the field then selected their grid position for the first qualifying heat (held on Saturday), with the top ten positions reversed for the second qualifying heat, held on Sunday. The grid for the Main Event was defined by the points earned by the drivers across the weekend, held later on Sunday.

Position	1st	2nd	3rd	4th	5th	6th	7th	8th	9th	10th	11th	12th	13th	14th	15th	Ret
Qualifying	10	7	5	3	2	1	0									0
Qualifying Heats	30	27	24	22	20	18	16	14	12	10	8	6	4	2	1	0

- No meeting points were awarded for the feature races. The winner of the Main Event is deemed the winner of the event as a whole.

== Race results ==
=== Sandown ===
Race	Pole position	Fastest lap	Winning driver	Winning entrant
Heat 1	(Australia) John Martin	(Australia) Tim Macrow	(Australia) Tim Macrow	MTEC Motorsport
Heat 2		(Australia) John Martin	(Australia) James Golding	Garry Rogers Motorsport
Main event		(Australia) James Golding	(Australia) James Golding	Garry Rogers Motorsport

==== Meeting points ====
(key)

Pos.	Driver	Q	H1	H2	Points
1	(Australia) Tim Macrow	2	1	2	64
2	(Australia) John Martin	1	2	3	61
3	(Australia) James Golding	5	3	1	56
4	(Brazil) Rubens Barrichello	3	7	5	41
5	(Australia) Alex Davison	7	6	4	40
6	(Australia) Will Brown	8	5	6	38
7	(Australia) Barton Mawer	10	9	7	28
8	(Australia) Tim Berryman	9	10	8	24
9	(Australia) Matthew Brabham	6	4	Ret	23
10	(Australia) Ricky Capo	4	8	12	23
11	(New Zealand) Taylor Cockerton	11	11	10	18
12	(Australia) Michael Gibson	13	12	11	14
13	(New Zealand) Tom Alexander	12	Ret	9	12
Pos.	Driver	Q	H1	H2	Points

==== Main Event ====
Pos.	No.	Driver	Team	Laps	Time/Retired	Grid
1	31	(Australia) James Golding	Garry Rogers Motorsport	11	19:34.7507	3
2	111	(Brazil) Rubens Barrichello	Team BRM	11	+1.4073	4
3	24	(Australia) John Martin	AGI Sport	11	+2.6131	2
4	38	(Australia) Will Brown	Eggleston Motorsport	11	+3.8050	6
5	83	(Australia) Matthew Brabham	MTEC Motorsport	11	+5.8425	9
6	33	(Australia) Tim Berryman	Team BRM	11	+6.7456	8
7	97	(New Zealand) Taylor Cockerton	MTEC Motorsport	11	+7.7964	11
8	22	(New Zealand) Tom Alexander	AGI Sport	11	+8.4327	13
9	27	(Australia) Barton Mawer	Milldun Motorsport	11	+8.7931	7
10	11	(Australia) Michael Gibson	Australian Racing Enterprises	11	+9.8833	12
Ret	8	(Australia) Alex Davison	Team BRM	8	Accident	5
Ret	23	(Australia) Tim Macrow	MTEC Motorsport	8	Retired	1
Ret	34	(Australia) Ricky Capo	Modena Engineering	0	Collision	10
Fastest lap: (Australia) James Golding (Garry Rogers Motorsport) – 1:09.4829 (lap 9)

=== The Bend Motorsport Park ===
Race	Pole position	Fastest lap	Winning driver	Winning entrant
Heat 1	(Australia) Anton de Pasquale	(Australia) Thomas Randle	(Australia) Thomas Randle	Team BRM
Heat 2		(Australia) John Martin	(Australia) Tim Macrow	MTEC Motorsport
Main event		(Australia) Anton de Pasquale	(Australia) John Martin	AGI Sport

==== Meeting points ====
(key)

Pos.	Driver	Q	H1	H2	Points
1	(Australia) Thomas Randle	2	1	6	55
2	(Australia) John Martin	3	3	3	53
3	(Australia) Anton de Pasquale	1	2	7	53
4	(Australia) James Golding	5	4	2	51
5	(Australia) Will Brown	4	5	4	45
6	(Australia) Tim Macrow	7	8	1	44
7	(Australia) Ricky Capo	6	7	5	37
8	(United Kingdom) James Winslow	8	6	8	32
9	(Australia) Braydan Willmington	10	10	9	22
10	(Australia) Michael Gibson	9	9	10	22
Pos.	Driver	Q	H1	H2	Points

==== Main Event ====
Pos.	No.	Driver	Team	Laps	Time/Retired	Grid
1	24	(Australia) John Martin	AGI Sport	16	30:43.2080	2
2	49	(Australia) Thomas Randle	Team BRM	16	+0.7141	1
3	38	(Australia) Will Brown	Eggleston Motorsport	16	+1.8949	5
4	99	(Australia) Anton de Pasquale	Team BRM	16	+10.1733 (Note: De Pasquale was penalised 15 seconds for two incidents: ten seconds for a first-lap collision with Thomas Randle, and five seconds for a jump start.)	3
5	34	(Australia) Ricky Capo	Modena Engineering	16	+11.2991	7
6	8	(United Kingdom) James Winslow	Team BRM	16	+13.3741	8
7	89	(Australia) Braydan Willmington	BW Motorsport	16	+48.0491	9
Ret	11	(Australia) Michael Gibson	Australian Racing Enterprises	13	Retired	10
Ret	23	(Australia) Tim Macrow	MTEC Motorsport	1	Collision	6
Ret	31	(Australia) James Golding	Garry Rogers Motorsport	1	Collision	4
Fastest lap: (Australia) Anton de Pasquale (Team BRM) – 1:41.4329 (lap 16)
