= Total Environment Centre =

Australian non-governmental organisation

- Type: Non-Governmental Organisation
- Industry: Environmentalism
- Founded: 1972, Australia
- Headquarters: Sydney, Australia
- Key people: Jeff Angel, Executive Director
- Products: Lobbying, research, campaigns.
- Revenue: 1,463,391 Australian dollar (2023)
- Total assets: 1,405,533 Australian dollar (2023)
- Number of employees: 10 (2023, 2020)
- Website: tec.org.au

The Total Environment Centre (TEC) is an Australian-based organisation that campaigns for the environment. Founded in 1972, the organisation lobbies business, industry, and politicians using research and focused campaigns. TEC has aided in creating national parks in New South Wales, preserving water catchments, and tracking the impacts of industrial wastes, including pollution caused by fracking, long wall mining, and beverage containers.

== Campaigns ==
TEC core campaigns include Living Landscapes (habitat and biodiversity), Cool Streets (urban sustainability), Waste Not (Waste and Recycling), and Green Capital (sustainable business and green economic frontiers). TEC also issues reports on major environmental issues in NSW and works on national campaigns such as CDS (container deposit scheme) and recycling infrastructure for safe and efficient electronic waste recycling. It is a member of the Boomerang Alliance of Australian environmental NGOs.
