= 2014 Australian Formula Ford Series =

Australian motor racing series

The 2014 Australian Formula Ford Series was an Australian motor racing series open to Formula Ford and Formula Ford 1600 cars. It was the first national series for Formula Fords to be conducted in Australia following the withdrawal of national championship status from the Australian Formula Ford Championship by the Confederation of Australian Motor Sport (CAMS) at the end of 2013. The series was sanctioned by the CAMS with the first five rounds each staged at a Shannons Nationals Motor Racing Championships meeting. The Formula Ford Association Inc was appointed as the Category Manager by CAMS for this series.

The series was won by Thomas Randle, driving a Mygale.

== Teams and drivers ==
The series was contested over six rounds with three races per round.

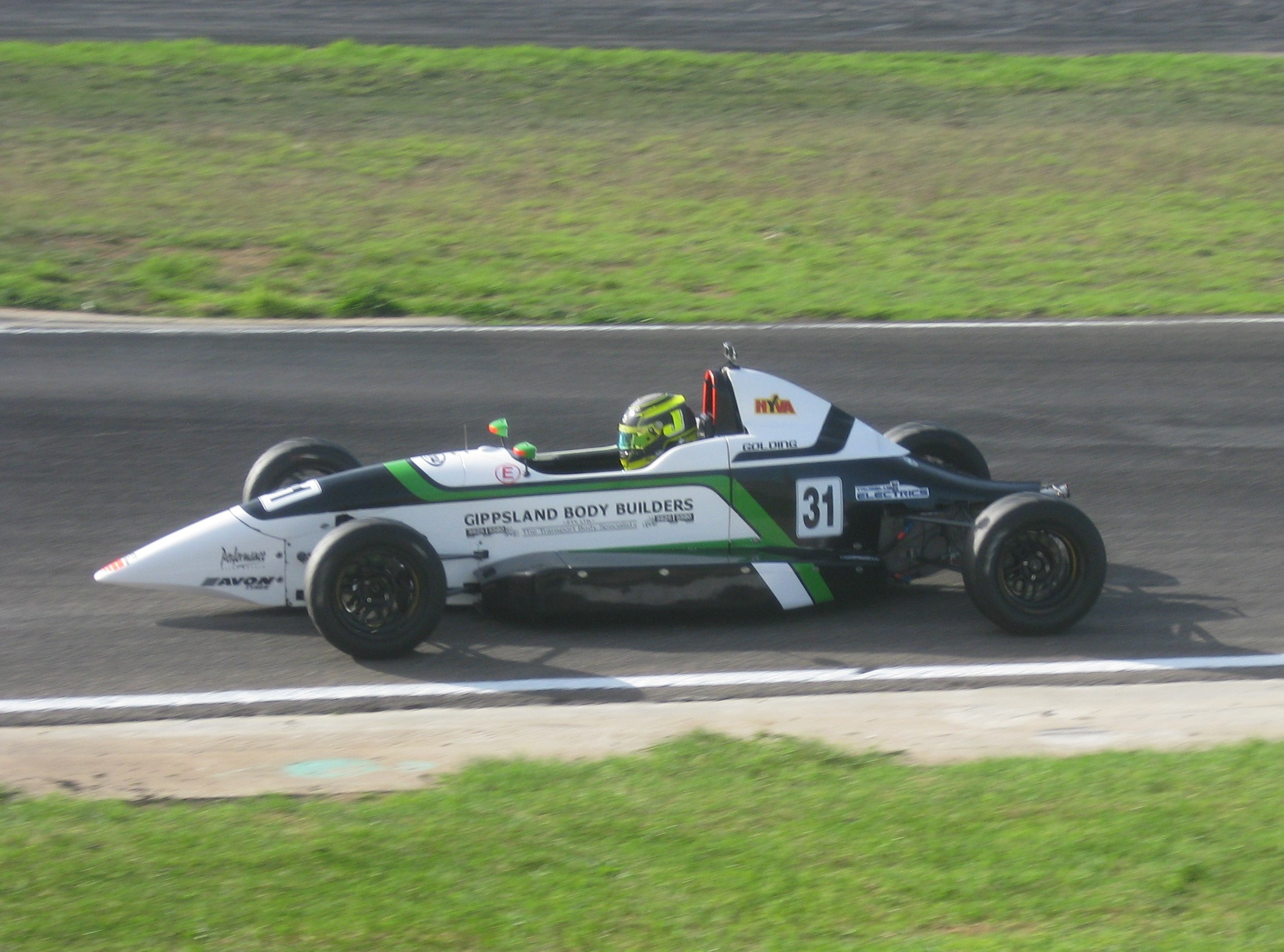
James Golding (Spectrum 014) placed third in the series

Team	Chassis	No	Driver	Class	Rounds
Sonic Motor Racing Services	Mygale SJ13	2	(Australia) Nick Rowe		All
Sonic Motor Racing Services	Mygale SJ01A	3	(Australia) Hamish Hardeman		All
Sonic Motor Racing Services	Mygale SJ12	4	(Australia) Christian Morina		All
Logistics 1	Mygale SJ11	5	(Australia) Damon Strongman		6
Zsidy Racing	Spectrum 012	6	(Australia) Paul Zsidy		2–6
Zsidy Racing	Spectrum 012	44	(Australia) James Crozier		2
Zsidy Racing	Spectrum 014	44	(United States) Max Mällinen		6
Zsidy Racing	Spectrum 011	78	(Australia) Brendan Jones	K	6
Fastway Couriers Wollongong	Mygale SJ07	7	(Australia) Cameron Walters	K	2–6
Colin M Hill Engineering	Mygale SJ01A	11	(Australia) Cameron Hill		All
Team ToolForce Racing	Listec WIL013	13	(Australia) Jimmy Vernon		1–2, 4–6
Sean Scott	Spectrum 010	14	(Australia) Scott Andrews	K	6
Borland Racing Developments	Spectrum 011c	15	(Australia) Tom Grech		All
Borland Racing Developments	Spectrum 014	31	(Australia) James Golding		All
Synergy Motorsport	Spectrum 012b	20	(Australia) Caitlin Wood		All
Synergy Motorsport	Spectrum 014	27	(Australia) Jake Parsons		1–2, 6
Synergy Motorsport	Spectrum	74	(Australia) Trent Grubel		1
Synergy Motorsport	Spectrum 014	88	(Australia) Greg Holloway		All
Express Print	Spectrum	24	(Australia) Nick Ellen		1, 3–4, 6
Bosch Car Service	Mygale SJ07	25	(Australia) Thomas Maxwell		6
American Vehicle Specialists	Van Diemen RF01	28	(Australia) Cade Southall	K	6
Gregory Edwards	Spectrum	33	(Australia) Gregory Edwards		1, 4
Marlotec Performance Group	Mygale SJ08	38	(Australia) Paul Marlan		6
Miedecke Motorsport	Listec WIL-05	43	(Australia) Bradley Forgeard	K	6
Dream Motorsport	Mygale SJ13A	49	(Australia) Thomas Randle		All
Dream Motorsport	Mygale SJ10A	97	(Australia) Liam McAdam		All
Dream Motorsport	Mygale SJ2011a	98	(Australia) Liam Sager		6
Phoenix Project Management	Van Diemen	75	(Australia) Julian Lunetta		1
Omega Engineering	Mygale	76	(Australia) Michael Hindrichs	K	1, 3–6
JRG Racing	Mygale SJ01A	77	(Australia) James Garley	K	All
Tim Hamilton	Spectrum 011b	78	(Australia) Tim Hamilton		3
Tim Hamilton	Spectrum 011b	87	(Australia) Tim Hamilton		5
WKTS Racing	Spectrum 011c	81	(Australia) Wade Scott		2–3, 6
Light and Power Electrical	Spectrum 06b	91	(Australia) Chris Slusarski		1
Exclusive Autosport	Spectrum 012	92	(United States) Tristan DeGrand		6
Thomas Corbett	Van Diemen RF03	93	(Australia) Thomas Corbett	K	3
BF Racing	Mygale 2011	94	(Australia) Jordan Lloyd		1–4, 6
All Security Northside	Spectrum	96	(Australia) Jimmy Bailey	K	1, 3–6
	Spectrum 010b	99	(Australia) John Connelly	K	6

== Calendar ==
Round	Circuit	Dates	Map
1	(South Australia) Mallala Motor Sport Park	26-27 April	2014 Australian Formula Ford Series is located in Australia
2	(Victoria (state)) Winton Motor Raceway	14-15 June	2014 Australian Formula Ford Series is located in Australia
3	Queensland Raceway	9-10 August	2014 Australian Formula Ford Series is located in Australia
4	(New South Wales) Wakefield Park Raceway	18-19 October	2014 Australian Formula Ford Series is located in Australia
5	(New South Wales) Sydney Motorsport Park	1-2 November	2014 Australian Formula Ford Series is located in Australia
6	(Victoria (state)) Phillip Island Grand Prix Circuit	29-30 November	2014 Australian Formula Ford Series is located in Australia

== Season summary ==
Rd	Race	Circuit	Pole position	Fastest lap	Winning driver	Winning team	Kent class winner
1	1	(South Australia) Mallala Motor Sport Park	(Australia) Hamish Hardeman	(Australia) James Golding	(Australia) James Golding	Borland Racing Developments	(Australia) James Garley
1	2	(South Australia) Mallala Motor Sport Park		(Australia) James Golding	(Australia) James Golding	Borland Racing Developments	(Australia) James Garley
1	3	(South Australia) Mallala Motor Sport Park		(Australia) Jordan Lloyd	(Australia) James Golding	Borland Racing Developments	(Australia) James Garley
2	1	(Victoria (state)) Winton Motor Raceway	(Australia) Jordan Lloyd	(Australia) James Golding	(Australia) Thomas Randle	Dream Motorsport	(Australia) Cameron Walters
2	2	(Victoria (state)) Winton Motor Raceway		(Australia) James Golding	(Australia) Jordan Lloyd	BF Racing	(Australia) Cameron Walters
2	3	(Victoria (state)) Winton Motor Raceway		(Australia) James Golding	(Australia) Jordan Lloyd	BF Racing	(Australia) Cameron Walters
3	1	Queensland Raceway	(Australia) Nick Rowe	(Australia) Jordan Lloyd	(Australia) Jordan Lloyd	BF Racing	(Australia) Cameron Walters
3	2	Queensland Raceway		(Australia) Hamish Hardeman	(Australia) Hamish Hardeman	Sonic Motor Racing Services	(Australia) Thomas Corbett
3	3	Queensland Raceway		(Australia) Nick Rowe	(Australia) James Golding	Borland Racing Developments	(Australia) Thomas Corbett
4	1	(New South Wales) Wakefield Park	(Australia) Thomas Randle	(Australia) Thomas Randle	(Australia) Thomas Randle	Dream Motorsport	(Australia) Cameron Walters
4	2	(New South Wales) Wakefield Park		(Australia) Thomas Randle	(Australia) Thomas Randle	Dream Motorsport	(Australia) Cameron Walters
4	3	(New South Wales) Wakefield Park		(Australia) Thomas Randle	(Australia) James Golding	Borland Racing Developments	(Australia) Cameron Walters
5	1	(New South Wales) Sydney Motorsport Park	(Australia) Jordan Lloyd	(Australia) Jordan Lloyd	(Australia) Jordan Lloyd	BF Racing	(Australia) Kane Coleman
5	2	(New South Wales) Sydney Motorsport Park		(Australia) Jordan Lloyd	(Australia) Thomas Randle	Dream Motorsport	(Australia) Kane Coleman
5	3	(New South Wales) Sydney Motorsport Park		(Australia) Jordan Lloyd	(Australia) Thomas Randle	Dream Motorsport	(Australia) Cameron Walters
6	1	(Victoria (state)) Phillip Island Grand Prix Circuit	(Australia) Thomas Randle	(Australia) Jordan Lloyd	(Australia) Jordan Lloyd	BF Racing	(Australia) Cade Southall
6	2	(Victoria (state)) Phillip Island Grand Prix Circuit		(Australia) Nick Rowe	(Australia) Jordan Lloyd	BF Racing	(Australia) Scott Andrews
6	3	(Victoria (state)) Phillip Island Grand Prix Circuit		(Australia) Nick Rowe	(Australia) Nick Rowe	Sonic Motor Racing Services	(Australia) Cade Southall

== Points system ==
Points were awarded within each category on a 20-16-14-12-10-8-6-4-2-1 basis to the first ten finishers in each race. In addition, one point was awarded to the driver achieving the fastest lap time in qualifying in each category in each round.

== Final standings ==
=== Australian Formula Ford Series (Fiesta powered cars) ===
Pos.	Driver	(South Australia) MAL			(Victoria (state)) WIN			(Queensland) QUE			(New South Wales) WAK			(New South Wales) SYD			(Victoria (state)) PHI			Pts
Pos.	Driver	R1	R2	R3	R1	R2	R3	R1	R2	R3	R1	R2	R3	R1	R2	R3	R1	R2	R3	Pts
1	(Australia) Thomas Randle	6	3	4	1	3	3	5	4	4	1	1	8	2	1	1	2	2	2	266
2.	(Australia) Jordan Lloyd	5	2	3	3	1	1	1	5	3	10	5	2	1	5	2	1	1	3	262
3	(Australia) James Golding	1	1	1	2	2	2	4	2	1	3	3	1	5	3	4	15	4	6	258
4	(Australia) Nick Rowe	2	Ret	7	4	4	4	3	13	5	6	6	3	3	2	3	3	5	1	201
5	(Australia) Hamish Hardeman	4	4	2	5	5	5	2	1	2	2	2	12	4	11	5	8	7	4	199
6	(Australia) Cameron Hill	11	8	10	6	6	7	7	3	Ret	4	4	4	Ret	Ret	Ret	Ret	10	10	83
7	(Australia) Liam McAdam	9	7	6	7	7	6	9	9	11	12	10	Ret	8	6	6	5	18	12	71
8	(Australia) Christian Morina	7	Ret	12	9	13	9	8	8	8	7	7	Ret	6	4	7	12	11	9	62
9	(Australia) Jake Parsons	3	5	8	10	10	8	Ret	6	6							7	Ret	13	54
10	(Australia) Tom Grech	10	Ret	9	8	8	10	6	7	7	11	9	10	7	7	10	9	9	11	50
11	(Australia) Jimmy Vernon	13	10	11							5	8	5	9	8	8	13	12	17	35
12	(Australia) Liam Sager																4	3	7	32
13	(Australia) Thomas Maxwell																6	6	5	26
14	(Australia) Trent Grubel	8	6	5																20
15	(Australia) Nick Ellen	12	9	19				10	10	10	Ret	12	6				11	13	14	13
16	(United States) Tristan DeGrand																10	8	8	9
17	(Australia) Greg Holloway	18	13	16	14	14	13	11	15	13	13	13	7	12	10	12	17	17	22	7
18	(Australia) Wade Scott				12	9	11	Ret	11	9							16	20	15	4
29	(Australia) Gregory Edwards	16	14	14							8	Ret								4
20	(Australia) Paul Zsidy				15	16	15	14	14	14	9	14	9	Ret	12	13	20	19	21	4
22	(Australia) Caitlin Wood	17	11	13	13	12	12	12	12	Ret	Ret	11	11	10	9	9	14	14	16	3
22	(Australia) Matthew Roesler	15	Ret	17	Ret	15	14													0
23	(Australia) Paul Marlan																18	16	19	0
24	(United States) Max Mallinen																19	Ret	20	0
25	(Australia) Damon Strongman																Ret	15	18	0
26	(Australia) Julian Lunetta	14	12	15																0
27	(Australia) Chris Slusarski	19	15	18																0
	(Australia) James Crozier				11	11	Ret													0
	(Australia) Tim Hamilton							13	Ret	12				11	Ret	11				0
Pos.	Driver	(South Australia) MAL			(Victoria (state)) WIN			(Queensland) QUE			(New South Wales) WAK			(New South Wales) SYD			(Victoria (state)) PHI			Pts
Pos.	Driver	R1	R2	R3	R1	R2	R3	R1	R2	R3	R1	R2	R3	R1	R2	R3	R1	R2	R3	Pts

=== Australian Formula Ford 1600 Series (Kent powered cars) ===
Pos.	Driver	(South Australia) MAL			(Victoria (state)) WIN			(Queensland) QUE			(New South Wales) WAK			(New South Wales) SYD			(Victoria (state)) PHI			Pts
Pos.	Driver	R1	R2	R3	R1	R2	R3	R1	R2	R3	R1	R2	R3	R1	R2	R3	R1	R2	R3	Pts
1	(Australia) James Garley	1	1	1	3	4	2	2	3	Ret	2	2	2	3	2	2	3	3	2	269
2	(Australia) Cameron Walters				1	1	1	1	2	2	1	1	1	2	3	1		8	3	242
3	(Australia) Michael Hinrichs	2	2	2	2	2	Ret	3	4	3	3	Ret	4	5	4	4	6	6	6	202
4	(Australia) Jimmy Bailey	3	3	3	4	3	3	5	Ret	Ret	4	3	3	6	5		5	9	Ret	172
5	(Australia) Cade Southall																1	2	1	56
6	(Australia) Kane Coleman													1	1	2				55
7	(Australia) Thomas Corbett							Ret	1	1										51
8	(Australia) Brendan Jones																2	4	4	40
9	(Australia) Dave Stevens													4	5	3				34
10	(Australia) John Connelly																4	5	5	32
11	(Australia) Scott Andrews																Ret	1	Ret	21
12	(Australia) Bradley Forgeard																	7	Ret	12
Pos.	Driver	(South Australia) MAL			(Victoria (state)) WIN			(Queensland) QUE			(New South Wales) WAK			(New South Wales) SYD			(Victoria (state)) PHI			Pts
Pos.	Driver	R1	R2	R3	R1	R2	R3	R1	R2	R3	R1	R2	R3	R1	R2	R3	R1	R2	R3	Pts
