= 2015 V8 Supercar season =

Seasons
- ← 2014 2016 →

The 2015 V8 Supercar season was the nineteenth year in which V8 Supercars contested the senior Australian touring car series. It was the 56th year of touring car racing in Australia since the first runnings of the Australian Touring Car Championship, now known as the International V8 Supercars Championship, and the fore-runner of the present day Bathurst 1000, the Armstrong 500.

The season began on 26 February at the Adelaide Street Circuit and finished on 6 December at the Homebush Street Circuit. 2015 featured the nineteenth V8 Supercar Championship, consisting of 36 races at 14 events covering all six states and the Northern Territory of Australia as well as an event in New Zealand. There was also a stand-alone event supporting the 2015 Australian Grand Prix. The season also featured the sixteenth second-tier Dunlop V8 Supercar Series, contested over seven rounds. For the eighth time a third-tier series was run, the Kumho Tyres V8 Touring Car Series.

The series championships were won by Mark Winterbottom (V8 Supercar Championship), Cameron Waters (Dunlop Series) and Liam McAdam (Kumho KVTC) respectively.

== Race calendar ==
Dates sourced from:

Event title	Circuit	City / state	Race/round	Date	Winner	Report
(South Australia) Clipsal 500 Adelaide	Adelaide Street Circuit	Adelaide, South Australia	IVC 1 IVC 2 IVC 3	26 February–1 March	Jamie Whincup; Fabian Coulthard; James Courtney	report
(South Australia) Clipsal 500 Adelaide	Adelaide Street Circuit	Adelaide, South Australia	DVS 1	26 February–1 March	Paul Dumbrell	
(Victoria (state)) MSS Security V8 Supercars Challenge	Albert Park Street Circuit	Melbourne, Victoria	IVC NC	12–15 March	Mark Winterbottom	report
Tyrepower Tasmania Super Sprint	Symmons Plains Raceway	Launceston, Tasmania	IVC 4 IVC 5 IVC 6	27–29 March	Craig Lowndes; Craig Lowndes; Jamie Whincup	report
(Victoria (state)) Sandown	Sandown Raceway	Melbourne, Victoria	KVTC 1	27–29 March	Jack Perkins	
(Western Australia) Ubet Perth Super Sprint	Barbagallo Raceway	Perth, Western Australia	IVC 7 IVC 8 IVC 9	1–3 May	Mark Winterbottom; Mark Winterbottom; Will Davison	report
(Western Australia) Ubet Perth Super Sprint	Barbagallo Raceway	Perth, Western Australia	DVS 2	1–3 May	Cameron Waters	
(Victoria (state)) NP300 Navara Winton Super Sprint	Winton Motor Raceway	Benalla, Victoria	IVC 10; IVC 11; IVC 12	15–17 May	Chaz Mostert; Mark Winterbottom; Mark Winterbottom	report
(Victoria (state)) NP300 Navara Winton Super Sprint	Winton Motor Raceway	Benalla, Victoria	DVS 3	15–17 May	Cameron Waters	
(Victoria (state)) Winton	Winton Motor Raceway	Benalla, Victoria	KVTC 2	12–14 June	Alex Rullo	
(Northern Territory) Skycity Triple Crown	Hidden Valley Raceway	Darwin, Northern Territory	IVC 13; IVC 14; IVC 15	19–21 June	Chaz Mostert; Craig Lowndes; David Reynolds	report
(Queensland) Castrol Edge Townsville 400	Townsville Street Circuit	Townsville, Queensland	IVC 16; IVC 17	10–12 July	Mark Winterbottom; Mark Winterbottom	report
(Queensland) Castrol Edge Townsville 400	Townsville Street Circuit	Townsville, Queensland	DVS 4	10–12 July	Cameron Waters	
(Queensland) Coates Hire Ipswich Super Sprint	Queensland Raceway	Ipswich, Queensland	IVC 18; IVC 19; IVC 20	31 July–2 August	Mark Winterbottom; Mark Winterbottom; Chaz Mostert	report
(Queensland) Coates Hire Ipswich Super Sprint	Queensland Raceway	Ipswich, Queensland	DVS 5	31 July–2 August	Cameron Waters	
Queensland Raceway	Queensland Raceway	Ipswich, Queensland	KVTC 3	7–9 August	Alex Rullo	
(New South Wales) Sydney Motorsport Park Super Sprint	Sydney Motorsport Park	Sydney, New South Wales	IVC 21; IVC 22; IVC 23	21–23 August	Chaz Mostert; Jamie Whincup; Chaz Mostert	report
(Victoria (state)) Wilson Security Sandown 500	Sandown Raceway	Melbourne, Victoria	IVC 24	11–13 September	Mark Winterbottom; Steve Owen	report
(Victoria (state)) Phillip Island	Phillip Island Grand Prix Circuit	Phillip Island, Victoria	KVTC 4	18–20 September	Liam McAdam	
(New South Wales) Supercheap Auto Bathurst 1000	Mount Panorama Circuit	Bathurst, New South Wales	IVC 25	8–11 October	Craig Lowndes; Steven Richards	report
(New South Wales) Supercheap Auto Bathurst 1000	Mount Panorama Circuit	Bathurst, New South Wales	DVS 6	8–11 October	Paul Dumbrell	
(Queensland) Castrol Gold Coast 600	Surfers Paradise Street Circuit	Surfers Paradise, Queensland	IVC 26 IVC 27	23–25 October	Shane van Gisbergen; Jonathon Webb; James Courtney; Jack Perkins	report
(New Zealand) ITM 500 Auckland	Pukekohe Park Raceway	Pukekohe, New Zealand	IVC 28; IVC 29; IVC 30	6–8 November	Jamie Whincup; David Reynolds; Jamie Whincup	report
(New South Wales) Sydney Motorsport Park	Sydney Motorsport Park	Sydney, New South Wales	KVTC 5	13–15 November	Liam McAdam	
(Victoria (state)) WD-40 Phillip Island Super Sprint	Phillip Island Grand Prix Circuit	Phillip Island, Victoria	IVC 31; IVC 32; IVC 33	20–22 November	Craig Lowndes; Jamie Whincup; Craig Lowndes	report
(New South Wales) Coates Hire Sydney 500	Homebush Street Circuit	Sydney, New South Wales	IVC 34; IVC 35; IVC 36	4–6 December	Jamie Whincup; Jamie Whincup; Shane van Gisbergen	report
(New South Wales) Coates Hire Sydney 500	Homebush Street Circuit	Sydney, New South Wales	DVS 7	4–6 December	Paul Dumbrell	

- IVC – International V8 Supercar Championship
- DVS – Dunlop V8 Supercar Series
- KVTC – Kumho Tyres V8 Touring Car Series
- NC – Non-championship

=== International V8 Supercars Championship ===
So Dick Johnson Racing Became DJR Team Penske
