= Homebush Street Circuit =

Temporary motor racing track

Sydney Olympic Park
- Street Circuit (2009–2016)
- Location: Sydney Olympic Park, New South Wales
- Coordinates: 33°50′41″S 151°3′58″E
- Opened: 4 December 2009; 16 years ago
- Closed: 4 December 2016; 9 years ago
- Architect: Mark Skaife
- Major events: Supercars Championship; Sydney 500 (2009–2016); Australian GT (2009, 2012); Australian F4 (2015); Stadium Super Trucks (2015)

Street Circuit (2009–2016)
- Length: 3.420 km (2.125 mi)
- Turns: 13
- Race lap record: 1:27.9481 ( (New Zealand) Shane van Gisbergen, Holden VF Commodore, 2016, Supercars)

The Homebush Street Circuit, also known as the Sydney Olympic Park Street Circuit, was a 3.420 km (2.125 mi) temporary street circuit around the former Olympic precinct at Sydney Olympic Park, Homebush Bay, Australia. The track hosted the Sydney 500 and was used for the first time at the final round of the 2009 V8 Supercar Championship Series. The circuit was used for the final time in December 2016 due to a relocation to Newcastle after it was announced the ANZ stadium precinct would be upgraded and block the track location.

== Layout ==
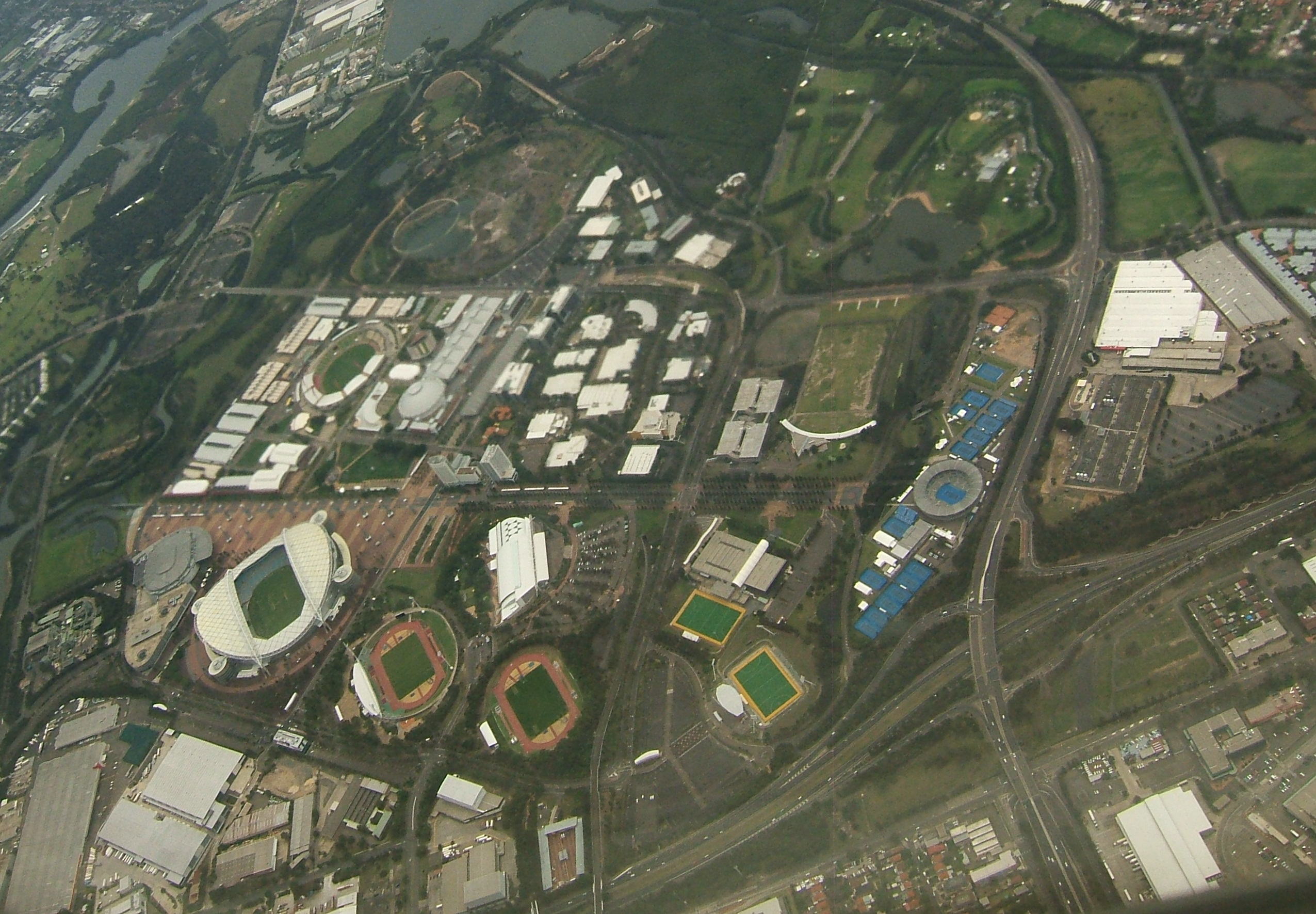
Aerial image of Sydney Olympic Park, including the circuit, looking north

The circuit was designed by Mark Skaife, who focused on creating a track with a variety of bumps, camber changes and fast and slow corners making it difficult to complete the perfect lap. It was constructed on Australia Avenue, Kevin Coombs Avenue, Edwin Flack Avenue and Dawn Fraser Avenue. 140 mature trees needed to be removed and kilometres of tarmac needed to be torn up to accommodate the race. Overall the track had a mixture of track surfaces.

V8 Supercar driver Jason Richards suggested that there were many difficult braking areas, interesting corners and good passing spots. The main straight was the single widest section of race track in Australia, while the straight along Edwin Flack Avenue was one of the narrowest. The outside of turn eight had an unusual negative camber that caught many drivers out in the inaugural race, resulting in several cars crashing into the outer barriers. The first race was won by the Holden Racing Team's Garth Tander from pole position while, the second 250 km race was won by Dick Johnson Racing's James Courtney (who started from second position on the grid). Jamie Whincup secured winning the 2009 V8 Supercar Championship Series after finishing fifth in race 1 and fourteenth in race 2.

== Environmental concerns ==
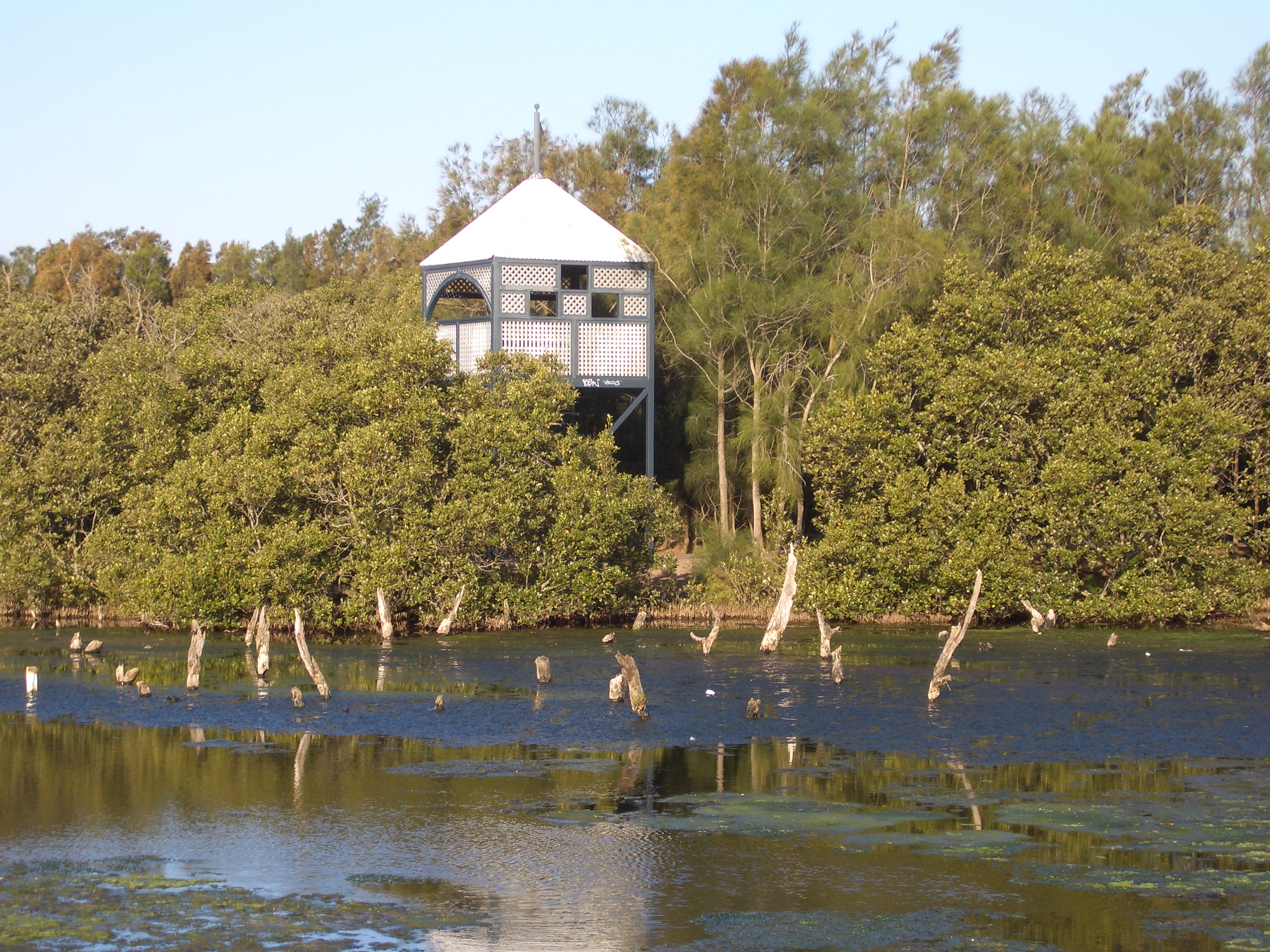
Wetlands at Sydney Olympic Park

The conversion of part of the Sydney Olympic Park precinct into a V8 street-car race circuit was widely criticised. The Total Environment Centre said that the New South Wales Government overrode the threatened species law, as well as the Homebush Bay Authority's planning principals, and would cause social, environmental and economic disruption at Sydney Olympic Park. Tony McCormick, who led the team that designed Sydney Olympic Park, said "I find it truly a travesty... The site was supposed to be a legacy for generations and we can’t even make it last a decade."

== Closure ==
In 2015, V8 Supercars proposed to shorten the circuit to reduce the event's costs. This proposal failed, and in March 2016 it was announced that the ongoing costs of running the event would result in 2016 being the final running of the Sydney 500.

== Lap records ==
As of 4 December 2016, the official race lap records at Homebush Street Circuit are listed as:

Category	Time	Driver	Vehicle	Date
Street Circuit (2009–2016): 3.420 km (2.125 mi)
Supercars Championship	1:27.9481	(New Zealand) Shane van Gisbergen	Holden VF Commodore	3 December 2016
Super2 Series	1:28.3668	(Australia) Cameron Waters	Ford FG Falcon	7 December 2014
GT3	1:28.6368	(Germany) Bernd Schneider	Mercedes-Benz SLS AMG GT3	2 December 2012
Porsche Carrera Cup	1:30.2244	(New Zealand) Jonny Reid	Porsche 911 (997) GT3 Cup	4 December 2011
Formula Ford	1:34.1651	(Australia) Anton De Pasquale	Mygale SJ13a	8 December 2013
Formula 4	1:34.2658	(Australia) Nick Rowe	Mygale M14-F4	6 December 2015
Touring Car Masters	1:36.8400	(Australia) John Bowe	Holden LH Torana SL/R 5000	4 December 2016
Aussie Racing Cars	1:43.0750	(Australia) Blake Sciberras	Toyota Aurion-Yamaha	5 December 2015
V8 Ute Racing Series	1:43.5860	(Australia) David Sieders	Holden VE SS Ute	3 December 2016
Australian Mini Challenge	1:46.2661	(Australia) Chris Alajajian	Mini JCW R56	5 December 2010
Toyota 86 Racing Series	1:49.3997	(Australia) Will Brown	Toyota 86	3 December 2016
Stadium Super Trucks	1:54.9534	(United States) Sheldon Creed	Stadium Super Truck	5 December 2015

== See also ==
- Sochi Autodrom – a Formula One circuit built around the site of the 2014 Winter Olympics in Sochi, Russia.
- Beijing Olympic Green Circuit – a Formula E circuit built around the site of the 2008 Summer Olympics in Beijing, China.
