= Richie Stanaway =

Racing car driver

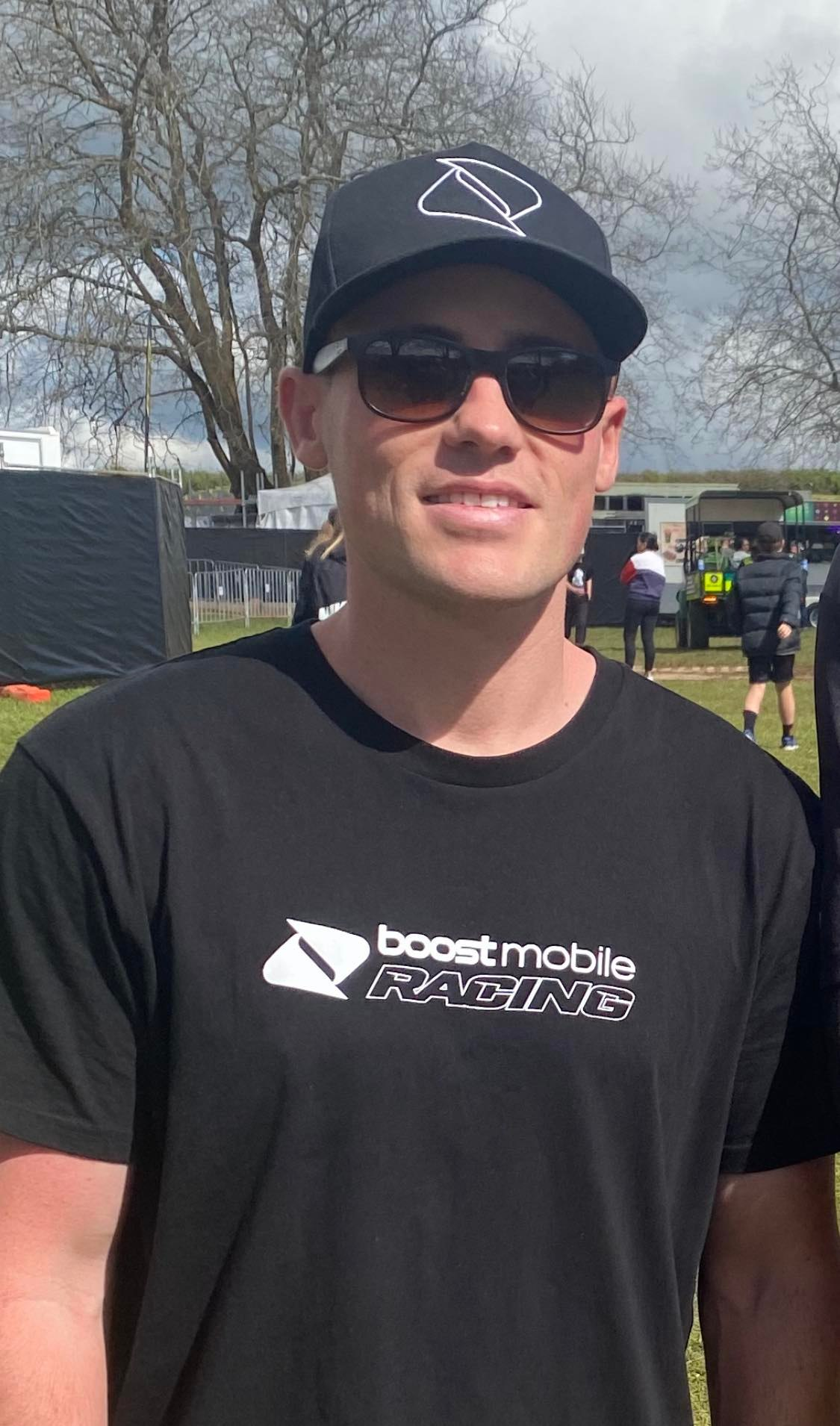
- Stanaway at Pukekohe in 2022
- Nationality: New Zealander
- Born: Richard Stanaway; 24 November 1991 (age 34) Tauranga, New Zealand
- Categorisation: FIA Gold (2013–2016); FIA Platinum (2017–)

Supercars Championship career
- Current team: Blanchard Racing Team (Endurance race co-driver)
- Championships: 0
- Races: 114
- Wins: 2
- Podiums: 4
- Pole positions: 0
- 2024 position: 19th (1447 points)

Richard Stanaway (born 24 November 1991) is a racing car driver from New Zealand. He currently competes in the Ryco Enduro Cup, co-driving with James Golding in the No. 7 Ford Mustang for Blanchard Racing Team.

== Career ==
=== New Zealand ===
Born in Tauranga, Stanaway was originally from a motocross background, before making the switch to speedway at the age of twelve. Following that came a brief foray into kart racing prior to making his formula car debut in 2007 after being selected for the New Zealand SpeedSport Scholarship. He competed in the 2007/08 Formula First championship finishing third overall as the highest placed rookie.

Stanaway then made the jump to the New Zealand Formula Ford Championship with Hamilton-based, debutant team TSR Racing alongside team-mate Martin Short. Prior to National championship he raced in the winter series to prepare, winning numerous races in the process with the newly imported Mygale chassis. Stanaway won the 2008/09 New Zealand Formula Ford Championship with fourteen race wins, becoming only the second driver in history to win the title as a rookie.

Stanaway then competed in the 2009 Australian Formula Ford Championship with Adelaide-based, Team BRM, making their debut in the Formula Ford championship after a long history of Formula 3 experience. During his Australian Formula Ford campaign in April 2009, Stanaway made his debut in New Zealand's Toyota Racing Series during a one-off appearance on the Hamilton 400 street circuit, scoring both pole positions and winning both races on debut. He then had to pull out halfway through the Australian Formula Ford Championship to take up testing and racing opportunities in the ADAC Formula Masters Championship in Germany. Despite missing six of the races, Richie finished sixth place in the 2009 Australian Formula Ford Championship taking one race win and six podium finishes.

=== Europe ===
In July 2009, Stanaway took up a testing opportunity at the EuroSpeedway Lausitz with Ma-Con Motorsport, a German team competing in the ADAC Formula Masters Championship. The test was organised by Tauranga businessman Maurice O' Reilly, a past investor of New Zealand Indy 500 winner, and Indycar series champion Scott Dixon. Stanaway impressed and was offered a race seat for the remaining six races of the 2009 ADAC Formula Masters Championship held at Nürburgring, Sachsenring and Oschersleben. The required budget was raised through a group of investors, and on 22 August 2009, Stanaway made his European debut at the famous Nürburgring circuit. During the six races, he scored two pole positions and numerous podium finishes, and following the signing of a management contract with RRT Holdings, headed by businessman Martin Reiss, the decision was made to return to contest the full ADAC Formula Masters Championship in 2010.

For the 2010 ADAC Formula Masters Championship, Stanaway dominated proceedings, taking twelve race wins and finished no lower than second place throughout the whole championship. Following that he completed tests with 2010 Formula Renault 2.0 Eurocup championship winning team, Koiranen Bros. Motorsport at Barcelona's Circuit de Catalunya, also a test with ATS-Formel 3 cup (German Formula 3) team Van Amersfoort Racing in Oschersleben, and a thorough testing programme with Tech-1 racing in Formula Renault 2.0. Richie then made his racing debut in the United Kingdom, competing in the Formula Renault UK winter cup with Atech-GP which took place at Snetterton and Pembrey, he took a race win and numerous podium placings over the six race series.

Stanaway was then released from his management contract with Martin Reiss to then sign with Gravity Sport Management, a management group headed by Lotus-Renault Formula One team principal Eric Boullier, and contested the 2011 ATS-Formel 3 cup (German Formula 3) with Dutch team Van Amersfoort Racing. He replaced Pedro Nunes for the remainder of the 2011 GP3 Series season with the pace-setters, Lotus ART, he would begin at the penultimate round of the championship in Belgium. He finished eighth in the first race and therefore started from pole in the second, where he kept the lead and won the race.

In November 2011, Stanaway tested the new BMW M3 DTM car as one of three young drivers, and then in December, he tested for Formula Renault 3.5 Series team Gravity–Charouz Racing in the invite-only test at Aragon, Spain where he topped the times on the first two days and finished the three-day test with the fastest overall time.

In 2014, Stanaway competed in GP3 for Status Grand Prix. He finished eighth in the overall standings, winning two races and scoring two additional podiums.

=== Touring Cars ===
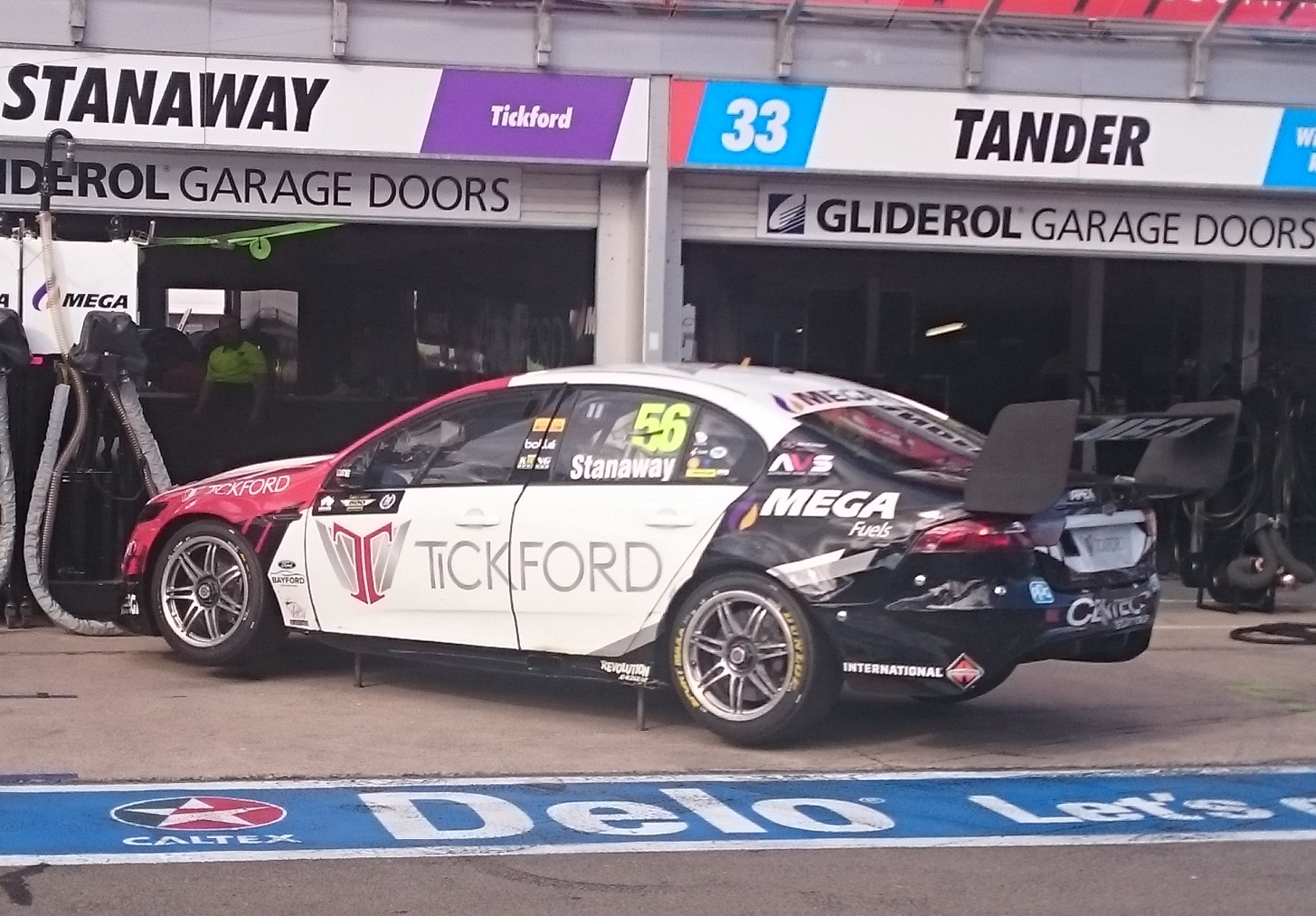
Stanaway contested the 2018 Supercars Championship driving a Ford Falcon FG X for Tickford Racing

Stanaway made his Supercars debut for Super Black Racing in 2016, co-driving with Chris Pither in the Pirtek Enduro Cup series. He impressed on debut in Sandown, fighting his way from a pit-stop down up to third with slick tyres on a damp track. His team were caught out by a safety car and would eventually drop to 17th and one lap down. In 2017, Stanaway competed in the Sydney round of the Super2 Series, winning the final race. He then drove in the Pirtek Enduro Cup with Cam Waters, winning the Sandown 500 from pole position. They then lead the Bathurst 1000 before an incident on a restart after the safety car, breaking the rear wing. They repaired the car and they went on to finish 16th, three laps down. They also finished in second the first race of the Gold Coast 600, but suffered steering damage in the second race, resulting in a finish position of 21st. It was announced in early December that Stanaway would drive full-time in the Supercars Championship with Tickford Racing.

In 2019, Stanaway moved to Garry Rogers Motorsport after a poor season in 2018. He aggravated a previous neck injury and missed seven races making a return at The Bend SuperSprint. At the Gold Coast 600 he was stood down for missing an autograph signing but reinstated at the next round at Sandown. After a difficult two years in Supercars, Stanaway retired from the sport in November 2019.

In 2021, Peter Adderton from Boost Mobile floated the idea of running a Wildcard entry for Stanaway and four time Bathurst winner Greg Murphy in the upcoming Bathurst 1000. The idea gained massive fan support, helping to convince Stanaway and Murphy to return for the first time since 2019 and 2014 respectively. On 8 June 2021, it was confirmed that the two would return in an Erebus Motorsport run Boost Mobile supported entry. On 12 November 2021, the wildcard was postponed due to travel restrictions between Australia & New Zealand. In late April 2022, Erebus Motorsport confirmed that the Wildcard would be revived for the upcoming Bathurst 1000. There were plans to run Stanaway & Murphy in solo events prior to Bathurst but those plans fell through, the two had three test days prior to the 1000 with the first set to be run at Winton Motor Raceway on 7 June.

In 2023, Stanaway would join Triple Eight to partner Shane van Gisbergen for the Supercars Enduro races, as well as to race in GT World Challenge Australia and GT World Challenge Asia. He would score two podiums in GT and two podiums in Supercars, including victory at the Bathurst 1000. On 21 August, it was announced that he would be driving full-time for Grove Racing in 2024.

== Racing record ==
=== Karting career ===
Season	Series	Position
2007	New Zealand Top Half Series - Rotex Light	10th
2007	New Zealand Top Half Series - Formula Junior	17th

=== Career summary ===
Season	Series	Team	Races	Wins	Poles	F/Laps	Podiums	Points	Position
2007	Formula First Manfeild Winter Series		3	0	0	1	1	170	14th
2007-08	NZ Formula First Championship	Sabre Motorsport	24	4	1	5	18	1368	**3rd**
2008	Formula Ford Manfeild Winter Series	TSR Racing	9	5	1	3	7	610	**3rd**
2008	Australian Formula Ford Championship	GForce Motorsport	2	0	0	0	0	0	NC
2008-09	New Zealand Formula Ford Championship	TSR Racing	21	11	3	4	15	1215	**1st**
2009	Australian Formula Ford Championship	Team BRM	16	1	0	2	6	164	6th
2009	ADAC Formel Masters	ma-con motorsport	6	0	1	0	2	52	8th
2009	Toyota Racing Series - Hamilton 400 Trophy		2	2	2	1	2	150	**1st**
2010	ADAC Formel Masters	ma-con motorsport	18	12	2	9	17	315	**1st**
2010	Formula Renault UK Winter Cup	Atech GP	6	1	0	1	3	99	5th
2010	Toyota Racing Series	ETEC Motorsport	6	1	0	2	3	362	10th
2011	German Formula 3 Championship	Van Amersfoort Racing	18	13	10	8	16	181	**1st**
2011	GP3 Series	Lotus ART	4	1	0	0	1	7	20th
2012	Formula Renault 3.5 Series	Lotus	5	0	0	0	0	8	22nd
2013	Porsche Supercup	DAMS	9	0	0	0	0	43	12th
2013	FIA World Endurance Championship - LMGTE Pro	Aston Martin Racing	6	0	0	1	1	27.75	19th
2013	Rolex Sports Car Series - GT	Aston Martin Racing	1	0	0	0	0	27	79th
2014	GP3 Series	Status Grand Prix	18	2	1	1	5	125	8th
2014	Formula Renault 3.5 Series	Lotus	4	0	0	0	1	21	18th
2014	FIA World Endurance Championship - LMGTE Am	Aston Martin Racing	3	0	0	1	3	54	10th
2015	GP2 Series	Status Grand Prix	18	2	0	0	2	60	10th
2015	FIA World Endurance Championship - LMGTE Pro	Aston Martin Racing V8	7	1	3	1	1	78	9th
2015	24 Hours of Le Mans - LMGTE Pro	Aston Martin Racing V8	1	0	1	1	0	N/A	6th
2015	European Le Mans Series - GTC	TF Sport	1	0	0	0	0	10	11th
2015	24 Hours of Nürburgring - SP9	Aston Martin Racing	1	0	0	0	0	N/A	14th
2016	FIA World Endurance Championship - LMGTE Pro	Aston Martin Racing	7	1	0	0	3	88	7th
2016	European Le Mans Series - GTE	Aston Martin Racing	1	0	1	0	1	16	15th
2016	24 Hours of Le Mans - LMGTE Pro	Aston Martin Racing	1	0	0	0	0	N/A	6th
2016	24 Hours of Nürburgring - SP9	Aston Martin Racing	1	0	0	0	0	N/A	DNF
2016	International V8 Supercars Championship	Super Black Racing	4	0	0	0	0	324	44th
2017	FIA World Endurance Championship - LMGTE Pro	Aston Martin Racing	3	0	0	0	0	32	14th
2017	Super2 Series	Prodrive Racing Australia	4	1	0	1	3	188	25th
2017	Supercars Championship	Prodrive Racing Australia	4	1	0	0	2	594	28th
2018	Supercars Championship	Tickford Racing	31	0	0	0	0	1214	25th
2019	Supercars Championship	Garry Rogers Motorsport	23	0	0	0	0	1146	24th
2022	Supercars Championship	Erebus Motorsport	1	0	0	0	0	144	42nd
2023	GT World Challenge Australia - Pro-Am	Triple Eight Race Engineering - JMR	4	0	0	0	2	45	11th
2023	GT World Challenge Asia - GT3	Triple Eight JMR	4	0	0	0	0	6	37th
2023	Supercars Championship	Triple Eight Race Engineering	2	1	0	0	2	558	26th
2023	Intercontinental GT Challenge	Grove Racing	1	0	0	0	0	0	NC
2024	Supercars Championship	Grove Racing	22	0	0	0	0	1447	19th
2025	Supercars Championship	PremiAir Racing	28	0	0	0	0	733	22nd

=== Complete ADAC Formel Masters results ===
(key) (Races in bold indicate pole position) (Races in italics indicate fastest lap)

Year	Entrant	1	2	3	4	5	6	7	8	9	10	11	12	13	14	15	16	17	18	19	20	21	DC	Points
2009	ma-con Motorsport	OSC; 1	OSC; 2	ASS; 1	ASS; 2	NÜR; 1	NÜR; 2	HOC; 1	HOC; 2	LAU; 1	LAU; 2	NÜR; 1; 13	NÜR; 2; 4	SAC; 1; 7	**SAC**; **2**; 3	OSC; 1; 2	OSC; 2; 5						8th	52
2010	ma-con Motorsport	OSC; 1; 2	OSC; 2; 1	OSC; 3; 2	**SAC**; **1**; 1	SAC; 2; 1	SAC; 3; 2	HOC; 1; 1	HOC; 2; 1	HOC; 3; 1	ASS; 1; 2	ASS; 2; 1	ASS; 3; 2	LAU; 1; 1	LAU; 2; 1	LAU; 3 Ret	**NÜR**; **1**; 1	NÜR; 2; 1	NÜR; 3; 1	OSC; 1	OSC; 2	OSC; 3	1st	315

=== Complete Toyota Racing Series results ===
(key) (Races in bold indicate pole position) (Races in italics indicate fastest lap)

Year	Entrant	1	2	3	4	5	6	7	8	9	10	11	12	13	14	15	DC	Points
2010	ETEC Motorsport	TER; 1	TER; 2	TER; 3	TIM; 1	TIM; 2	TIM; 3	HMP; 1; 4	HMP; 2; 6	HMP; 3; 2	MAN; 1; 1	MAN; 2; 2	MAN; 3; 4	TAU; 1	TAU; 2	TAU; 3	10th	362

=== Complete New Zealand Grand Prix results ===
Year	Team	Car	Qualifying	Main race
2010	(New Zealand) ETEC Motorsport	Tatuus TT104ZZ - Toyota	3rd	4th

=== Complete German Formula Three Championship results ===
(key) (Races in bold indicate pole position) (Races in italics indicate fastest lap)

Year	Entrant	Chassis	Engine	1	2	3	4	5	6	7	8	9	10	11	12	13	14	15	16	17	18	DC	Points
2011	Van Amersfoort Racing	Dallara F306	Volkswagen	OSC; 1; 1	OSC; 2; 1	SPA; 1; 2	SPA; 2; 1	**SAC**; **1**; 1	SAC; 2; 4	**ASS**; **1**; 1	**ASS**; **2**; 1	**ZOL**; **1**; 1	ZOL; 2; 5	**RBR**; **1**; 1	**RBR**; **2**; 1	**LAU**; **1**; 2	**LAU**; **2**; 1	ASS; 1; 2	**ASS**; **2**; 1	HOC; 1; 1	**HOC**; **2**; 1	1st	181

=== Complete Macau Grand Prix results ===
Year	Team	Car	Qualifying	Quali Race	Main race
2011	Van Amersfoort Racing	Dallara F308 - Volkswagen	21st	15th	DNF

=== Complete GP3 Series results ===
(key) (Races in bold indicate pole position) (Races in italics indicate fastest lap)

Year	Entrant	1	2	3	4	5	6	7	8	9	10	11	12	13	14	15	16	17	18	DC	Points
2011	Lotus ART	IST; FEA	IST; SPR	CAT; FEA	CAT; SPR	VAL; FEA	VAL; SPR	SIL; FEA	SIL; SPR	NÜR; FEA	NÜR; SPR	HUN; FEA	HUN; SPR	SPA; FEA; 8	SPA; SPR; 1	MNZ; FEA; 10	MNZ; SPR; 19			20th	7
2014	Status Grand Prix	CAT; FEA; 3	CAT; SPR; 4	RBR; FEA; 4	RBR; SPR; 3	SIL; FEA; 7	SIL; SPR; 1	HOC; FEA; 13	HOC; SPR; 7	**HUN**; **FEA**; 1	HUN; SPR; 6	SPA; FEA; 7	SPA; SPR; 2	MNZ; FEA; 9	MNZ; SPR; Ret	SOC; FEA; 12	SOC; SPR; Ret	YMC; FEA; 12	YMC; SPR; 7	8th	125

=== Complete Formula Renault 3.5 Series results ===
(key) (Races in bold indicate pole position) (Races in italics indicate fastest lap)

Year	Team	1	2	3	4	5	6	7	8	9	10	11	12	13	14	15	16	17	Pos	Points
2012	Lotus	ALC; 1 Ret	ALC; 2; 6	MON; 1 Ret	SPA; 1 NC	SPA; 2 Ret	NÜR; 1	NÜR; 2	MSC; 1	MSC; 2	SIL; 1	SIL; 2	HUN; 1	HUN; 2	LEC; 1	LEC; 2	CAT; 1	CAT; 2	22nd	8
2014	Lotus	MNZ; 1	MNZ; 2	ALC; 1	ALC; 2	MON; 1	SPA; 1 Ret	SPA; 2; 8	MSC; 1; 9	MSC; 2; 3	NÜR; 1	NÜR; 2	HUN; 1	HUN; 2	LEC; 1	LEC; 2	JER; 1	JER; 2	18th	21

=== Complete GP2 Series results ===
(key) (Races in bold indicate pole position) (Races in italics indicate fastest lap)

Year	Entrant	1	2	3	4	5	6	7	8	9	10	11	12	13	14	15	16	17	18	19	20	21	22	DC	Points
2015	Status Grand Prix	BHR; FEA; 15	BHR; SPR; 11	CAT; FEA; 10	CAT; SPR; 19	MON; FEA; 7	MON; SPR; 1	RBR; FEA; 23	RBR; SPR; 15	SIL; FEA; Ret	SIL; SPR; 13	HUN; FEA; 21	HUN; SPR; 13	SPA; FEA; 18	SPA; SPR; 13	MNZ; FEA; 4	MNZ; SPR; 4	SOC; FEA; 7	SOC; SPR; 1	BHR; FEA	BHR; SPR	YMC; FEA	YMC; SPR	10th	60

=== Complete Porsche Supercup results ===
(key) (Races in bold indicate pole position) (Races in italics indicate fastest lap)

Year	Team	1	2	3	4	5	6	7	8	9	DC	Points
2013	DAMS	CAT; 9	MON; 7	SIL; 13	NÜR; 10	HUN; Ret	SPA; 13	MNZ; Ret	YMC; 17	YMC; 4	12th	43

=== Complete FIA World Endurance Championship results ===
Year	Entrant	Class	Car	Engine	1	2	3	4	5	6	7	8	9	Rank	Points
2013	Aston Martin Racing	LMGTE Pro	Aston Martin Vantage GTE	Aston Martin 4.5 L V8	SIL	SPA; 6	LMS	SÃO; 5	COA; Ret	FUJ; 6	SHA; 2	BHR; Ret		19th	27.75
2014	Aston Martin Racing	LMGTE Am	Aston Martin Vantage GTE	Aston Martin 4.5 L V8	SIL	SPA; 2	LMS	COA; 2	FUJ	SHA; 2	BHR	SÃO		10th	54
2015	Aston Martin Racing V8	LMGTE Pro	Aston Martin Vantage GTE	Aston Martin 4.5 L V8	SIL; 6	**SPA**; 1	**LMS**; 9	NÜR; 5	**COA**; 4	FUJ	SHA; 5	BHR; 7		9th	78
2016	Aston Martin Racing	LMGTE Pro	Aston Martin Vantage GTE	Aston Martin 4.5 L V8	SIL; Ret	SPA; 3	LMS; 3	NÜR; 5	MEX; 1	COA	FUJ; 6	SHA; Ret	BHR	7th	88
2017	Aston Martin Racing	LMGTE Pro	Aston Martin Vantage GTE	Aston Martin 4.5 L V8	SIL; 6	SPA; 8	LMS; 5	NÜR	MEX	COA	FUJ	SHA	BHR	14th	32

=== Complete European Le Mans Series results ===
Year	Entrant	Class	Chassis	Engine	1	2	3	4	5	6	Rank	Points
2015	TF Sport	GTC	Aston Martin V12 Vantage GT3	Aston Martin 4.5 L V8	SIL	IMO	RBR	LEC	EST; 5		11th	10
2016	Aston Martin Racing	GTE	Aston Martin Vantage GTE	Aston Martin 4.5 L V8	**SIL**; 3	IMO	RBR	LEC	SPA	EST	15th	16

=== 24 Hours of Daytona results ===
Year	Team	Co-Drivers	Car	Class	Laps	Pos.	Class Pos.
2014	(United Kingdom) Aston Martin Racing V8	(Germany) Stefan Mücke (United Kingdom) Darren Turner (Portugal) Pedro Lamy (Canada) Paul Dalla Lana	Aston Martin Vantage GTE	GTLM	610	44th	8th
2016	(United Kingdom) Aston Martin Racing V8	(Austria) Mathias Lauda (Portugal) Pedro Lamy (Canada) Paul Dalla Lana	Aston Martin Vantage GTE	GTD	702	17th	4th

=== 24 Hours of Le Mans results ===
Year	Team	Co-Drivers	Car	Class	Laps	Pos.	Class Pos.
2015	(United Kingdom) Aston Martin Racing V8	(Brazil) Fernando Rees (United Kingdom) Alex MacDowall	Aston Martin Vantage GTE	GTE; Pro	320	34th	6th
2016	(United Kingdom) Aston Martin Racing	(United Kingdom) Jonathan Adam (Brazil) Fernando Rees	Aston Martin Vantage GTE	GTE; Pro	337	24th	6th
2017	(United Kingdom) Aston Martin Racing	(Denmark) Nicki Thiim (Denmark) Marco Sørensen	Aston Martin Vantage GTE	GTE; Pro	334	25th	9th

=== 12 Hours of Sebring results ===
Year	Team	Co-Drivers	Car	Class	Laps	Pos.	Class Pos.
2016	(United Kingdom) Aston Martin Racing V8	(Austria) Mathias Lauda (Portugal) Pedro Lamy (Canada) Paul Dalla Lana	Aston Martin Vantage GTE	GTD	229	32nd	10th

=== Gulf 12 Hours results ===
Year	Team	Co-Drivers	Car	Class	Laps	Pos.	Class Pos.
2023	(Australia) Grove Racing	(Australia) Brenton Grove (Australia) Stephen Grove	Porsche 911 GT3 R (992)	PA	34	24th	9th

=== Super2 Series results ===
(key) (Races in bold indicate pole position) (Races in italics indicate fastest lap)

Year	Team	No.	Car	1	2	3	4	5	6	7	8	9	10	11	12	13	14	15	16	17	18	19	20	21	Position	Points
2017	Prodrive Racing Australia	6	Ford FG X Falcon	ADE; R1	ADE; R2	ADE; R3	SYM; R4	SYM; R5	SYM; R6	SYM; R7	PHI; R8	PHI; R9	PHI; R10	PHI; R11	TOW; R12	TOW; R13	SMP; R14; 3	SMP; R15; 4	SMP; R16; 3	SMP; R17; 1	SAN; R18	SAN; R19	NEW; R20	NEW; R21	25th	263

=== Supercars Championship results ===
Supercars results
Year	Team	No.	Car	1	2	3	4	5	6	7	8	9	10	11	12	13	14	15	16	17	18	19	20	21	22	23	24	25	26	27	28	29	30	31	32	33	34	35	36	37	Position	Points
2016	Super Black Racing	111	Ford FG X Falcon	ADE; R1	ADE; R2	ADE; R3	SYM; R4	SYM; R5	PHI; R6	PHI; R7	BAR; R8	BAR; R9	WIN; R10; PO	WIN; R11; PO	HID; R12	HID; R13	TOW; R14	TOW; R15	QLD; R16	QLD; R17	SMP; R18	SMP; R19	SAN; QR; EX	SAN; R20; 17	BAT; R21; 12	SUR; R22; 10	SUR; R23; Ret	PUK; R24	PUK; R25	PUK; R26	PUK; R27	SYD; R28	SYD; R29								44th	324
2017	Prodrive Racing Australia	6	Ford FG X Falcon	ADE; R1	ADE; R2	SYM; R3	SYM; R4	PHI; R5	PHI; R6	BAR; R7	BAR; R8	WIN; R9	WIN; R10	HID; R11	HID; R12	TOW; R13	TOW; R14	QLD; R15; PO	QLD; R16; PO	SMP; R17	SMP; R18	SAN; QR; 3	**SAN**; **R19**; **1**	BAT; R20; 16	SUR; R21; 2	SUR; R22; 21	PUK; R23	PUK; R24	NEW; R25	NEW; R26											28th	594
2018	Tickford Racing	56	Ford FG X Falcon	ADE; R1; Ret	ADE; R2; 20	MEL; R3; 24	MEL; R4; Ret	MEL; R5; 25	MEL; R6; 18	SYM; R7; 25	SYM; R8; Ret	PHI; R9; 19	PHI; R10; 20	BAR; R11; 24	BAR; R12; 19	WIN; R13; 22	WIN; R14; 9	HID; R15; 23	HID; R16; 19	TOW; R17; 23	TOW; R18; 20	QLD; R19; 12	QLD; R20; 18	SMP; R21; 21	BEN; R22; 22	BEN; R23; 22	SAN; QR; 17	SAN; R24; 20	BAT; R25; 22	SUR; R26; Ret	SUR; R27; C	PUK; R28; 23	PUK; R29; 20	NEW; R30; 17	NEW; R31; 23						25th	1214
2019	Garry Rogers Motorsport	33	Holden ZB Commodore	ADE; R1; 18	ADE; R2; 18	MEL; R3; 17	MEL; R4; 21	MEL; R5; DSQ	MEL; R6; 21	SYM; R7; 16	SYM; R8; 19	PHI; R9; 14	PHI; R10; 23	BAR; R11; 22	BAR; R12; 21	WIN; R13; 25	WIN; R14; WD	HID; R15	HID; R16	TOW; R17	TOW; R18	QLD; R19	QLD; R20	BEN; R21; 16	BEN; R22; 24	PUK; R23; 10	PUK; R24; 9	BAT; R25; 12	SUR; R26; 23	SUR; R27	SAN; QR; 19	SAN; R28; 14	NEW; R29; 16	NEW; R30; 15							24th	1146
2022	Erebus Motorsport	51	Holden ZB Commodore	SMP; R1	SMP; R2	SYM; R3	SYM; R4	SYM; R5	MEL; R6	MEL; R7	MEL; R8	MEL; R9	BAR; R10	BAR; R11	BAR; R12	WIN; R13	WIN; R14	WIN; R15	HID; R16	HID; R17	HID; R18	TOW; R19	TOW; R20	BEN; R21	BEN; R22	BEN; R23	SAN; R24	SAN; R25	SAN; R26	PUK; R27	PUK; R28	PUK; R29	BAT; R30; 11	SUR; R31	SUR; R32	NEW; R33	NEW; R34				42nd	144
2023	Triple Eight Race Engineering	97	Chevrolet Camaro ZL1	NEW; R1	NEW; R2	MEL; R3	MEL; R4	MEL; R5	MEL; R6	BAR; R7	BAR; R8	BAR; R9	SYM; R10	SYM; R11	SYM; R12	HID; R13	HID; R14	HID; R15	TOW; R16	TOW; R17	SMP; R18	SMP; R19	BEN; R20	BEN; R21	BEN; R22	SAN; R23; 3	BAT; R24; 1	SUR; R25	SUR; R26	ADE; R27	ADE; R28										26th	558
2024	Grove Racing	26	Ford Mustang S650	BAT1; R1; 4	BAT1; R2; 11	MEL; R3; 12	MEL; R4; 13	MEL; R5; 7	MEL; R6; 8	TAU; R7; 6	TAU; R8; 10	BAR; R9; 24	BAR; R10; 12	HID; R11; 14	HID; R12; 10	TOW; R13; 14	TOW; R14; 14	SMP; R15; 16	SMP; R16; 21	SYM; R17; 16	SYM; R18; 17	SAN; R19; Ret	BAT; R20; 9	SUR; R21; 9	SUR; R22; 7	ADE; R23; DNS	ADE; R24; DNS														19th	1447
2025	PremiAir Racing	62	Chevrolet Camaro ZL1	SYD; R1; 23	SYD; R2; Ret	SYD; R3; 17	MEL; R4; 16	MEL; R5; 21	MEL; R6; 11	MEL; R7; C	TAU; R8; 17	TAU; R9; 21	TAU; R10; 13	SYM; R11; 10	SYM; R12; 22	SYM; R13; 5	BAR; R14; 24	BAR; R15; 17	BAR; R16; 14	HID; R17; 22	HID; R18; Ret	HID; R19; 18	TOW; R20; 16	TOW; R21; 15	TOW; R22; 14	QLD; R23; 15	QLD; R24; 8	QLD; R25; 10	BEN; R26; 23	BAT; R27; Ret	SUR; R28; 19	SUR; R29; Ret	SAN; R30	SAN; R31	ADE; R32	ADE; R33	ADE; R34				24th	768
2026	Blanchard Racing Team	7	Ford Mustang S650	SMP; R1	SMP; R2	SMP; R3	MEL; R4	MEL; R5	MEL; R6	MEL; R7	TAU; R8	TAU; R9	TAU; R10	CHR; R11	CHR; R12	CHR; R13	SYM; R14	SYM; R15	SYM; R16	BAR; R17	BAR; R18	BAR; R19	HID; R20	HID; R21	HID; R22	TOW; R23	TOW; R24	TOW; R25	QLD; R26	QLD; R27	QLD; R28	BEN; R29	BAT; R30	SUR; R31	SUR; R32	SAN; R33	SAN; R34	ADE; R35	ADE; R36	ADE; R37		

=== Bathurst 1000 results ===
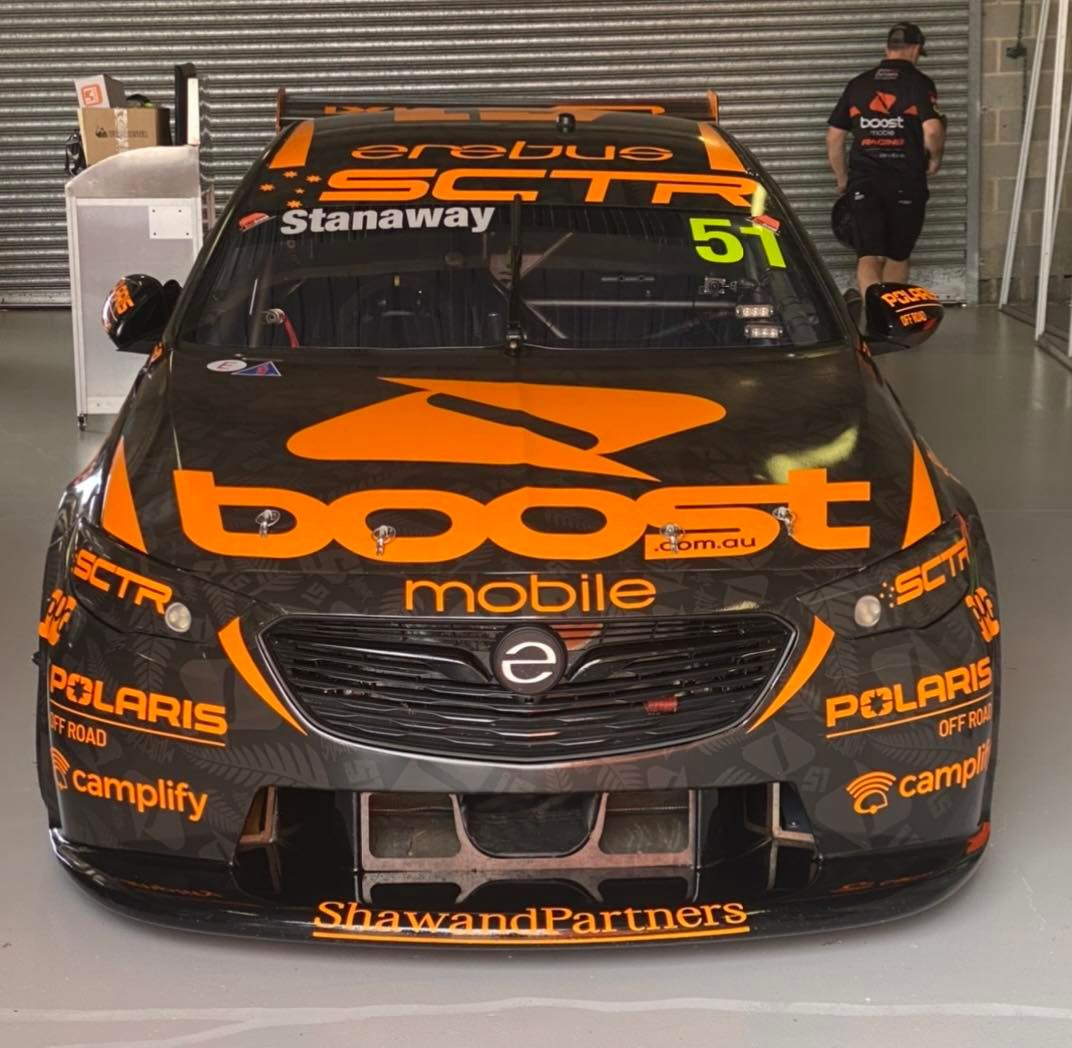
Stanaway's entry for the 2022 Bathurst 1000.

Year	Team	Car	Co-Driver	Position	Lap
2016	Super Black Racing	Ford Falcon FG X	(New Zealand) Chris Pither	12th	161
2017	Prodrive Racing Australia	Ford Falcon FG X	(Australia) Cameron Waters	16th	159
2018	Tickford Racing	Ford Falcon FG X	(Australia) Steve Owen	22nd	152
2019	Garry Rogers Motorsport	Holden Commodore ZB	(New Zealand) Chris Pither	12th	161
2022	Erebus Motorsport	Holden Commodore ZB	(New Zealand) Greg Murphy	11th	161
2023	Triple Eight Race Engineering	Chevrolet Camaro Mk.6	(New Zealand) Shane van Gisbergen	**1st**	161
2024	Grove Racing	Ford Mustang S650	(Australia) Dale Wood	9th	161
2025	PremiAir Racing	Chevrolet Camaro Mk.6	(Australia) Nash Morris	DNF	143
2026	Blanchard Racing Team	Ford Mustang S650	(Australia) James Golding		

=== Bathurst 12 Hours results ===
Year	Team	Co-Drivers	Car	Class	Laps	Pos.	Class Pos.
2023	(Australia) Triple Eight Race Engineering	(Malaysia) Prince Jeffri Ibrahim (Australia) Jamie Whincup	Mercedes-AMG GT3 Evo	PA	319	10th	**3rd**

Sporting positions
Preceded by Daniel Abt	ADAC Formel Masters; Champion; 2010	Succeeded by Pascal Wehrlein
Preceded by Tom Dillmann	German Formula Three Champion; 2011	Succeeded by Jimmy Eriksson
Preceded by Garth Tander; Warren Luff	Winner of the Sandown 500; 2017 (with Cam Waters)	Succeeded by Jamie Whincup; Paul Dumbrell
Preceded by Shane van Gisbergen; Garth Tander	Winner of the Bathurst 1000; 2023 (with Shane van Gisbergen)	Succeeded by Brodie Kostecki; Todd Hazelwood
