= Triple Eight Race Engineering =

Australian auto racing team

- Manufacturer: Ford
- Owner: Tony Quinn (40%); Jamie Whincup (30%); Steve Blackmore (15%); Earl Evans (15%)
- Team Principal: Jamie Whincup
- Team Manager: Mark Dutton
- Race Drivers: 11. Jackson Walls; 88. Broc Feeney; 888. Will Brown
- Race Engineers: 11. Isaac Baldry; 88. Martin Short; 888. David Cauchi
- Chassis: Ford Mustang S650
- Debut: 2003
- Drivers' Championships: 11 (2008, 2009, 2011, 2012, 2013, 2014, 2016, 2017, 2021, 2022, 2024)
- Teams' Championships: 13 (2008, 2010, 2011, 2012, 2013, 2014, 2015, 2016, 2018, 2021, 2022, 2024, 2025)
- Round wins: 105
- Race wins: 252
- 2024 position: 150
- 1st (5868 pts)

Triple Eight Race Engineering, branded as Red Bull Ampol Racing in Supercars, is an Australian motor racing team competing in the Supercars Championship. The team has been the only Brisbane-based V8 Supercar team since its formation, originally taking over and operating out of the former Briggs Motor Sport workshop in Bowen Hills during the 2003 season before moving to Banyo in 2009. The team has won the Supercars drivers' championship eleven times, the teams' championship thirteen times and the Bathurst 1000 ten times.

The team currently runs three Ford Mustang S650s for Broc Feeney, Will Brown and Jackson Walls. Additionally, the team provides technical support to Blanchard Racing Team. The team performs its testing at Queensland Raceway.

== History ==
Triple Eight Race Engineering was formed in 1996 in the United Kingdom, running Vauxhall's program in the British Touring Car Championship before expanding into Australian V8 Supercars, purchasing the Briggs Motor Sport team in September 2003. The sale included a custom-built facility in the Brisbane suburb of Bowen Hills, and a staff of 35 people. Engineers in Brisbane worked closely with the Triple Eight staff in the UK to build two new Ford BA Falcons, while the team principals managed to attract substantial financial support from Ford.

=== Team Betta Electrical ===
The team debuted at the 2003 Sandown 500. 2004 was Triple Eight's first full season in V8 Supercars. It was a disappointing year for all involved, with both cars dogged by mechanical problems. Paul Radisich came 19th in the championship, while Max Wilson finished a lowly 28th. The team's car speed, however, was certainly up with the front-runners for many weekends.

2005 saw a massive form reversal for Triple Eight. Craig Lowndes and Steve Ellery were signed as drivers and Stone Brothers Racing engineer Campbell Little joined the team. Lowndes in particular was a catalyst for change, which along with powerful and reliable Stone Brothers Racing sourced engines saw a massive improvement in the team's performance. Lowndes finished second in the championship, finishing the year strongly and narrowly missing out on snatching the title from Russell Ingall. Ellery came 13th. The year's highlights included a win for Lowndes and Yvan Muller at the Sandown 500 and a third placing for Ellery and Adam Macrow at the Bathurst 1000. Lowndes won a further three rounds and qualified on pole position four times (including Bathurst).

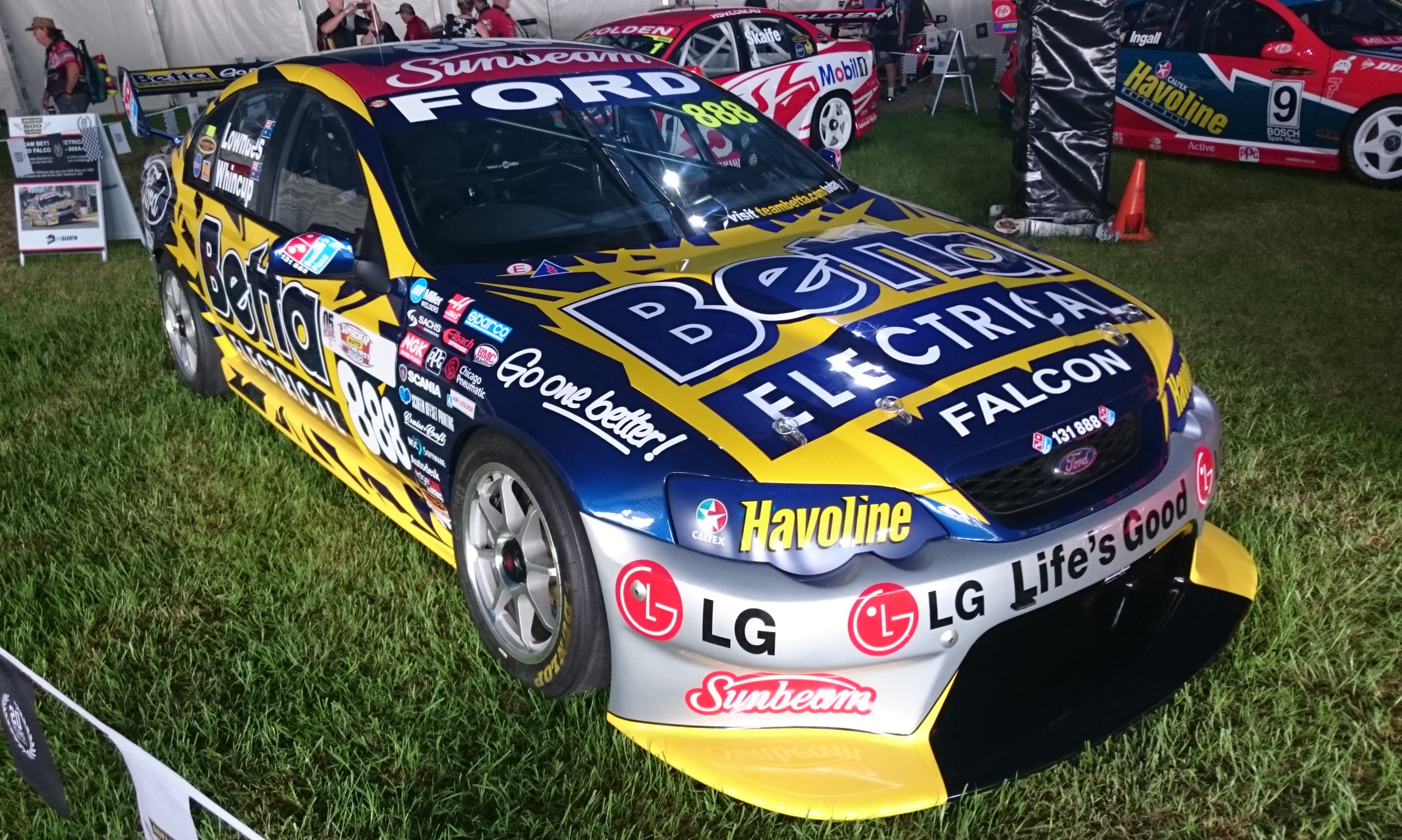
The 2006 Bathurst 1000-winning Ford Falcon of Craig Lowndes and Jamie Whincup (pictured in 2018)

2006 saw a continuation of this strong form, with new recruit Jamie Whincup replacing Ellery, and making an instant impact in the form of a win at the Clipsal 500. Lowndes scored four round wins, including sharing victory at the Bathurst 1000 with Whincup.

Having led the championship to Round 11, Lowndes lost the series lead at the Symmons Plains weekend. Having seen a big chunk of his lead evaporate at the previous round on the Gold Coast following two penalties for dangerous driving approaching the starting grid, the pressure was on Lowndes to perform at the Tasmania event. Unfortunately for Lowndes, he was caught in a massive crash on the opening lap of the first race, forcing him to the rear of the grid for the next race. He recovered, but he lost the series lead to Rick Kelly, who took a handy 73-point lead. At the next round in Bahrain, Lowndes stormed back into contention as Kelly encountered problems of his own. The stage was set for a spectacular finale at Phillip Island, with the two contenders separated by just seven points.

Lowndes qualified on the third row of the grid, while Kelly was further back on the fifth row. However, Kelly fought back in the first race to be right on Lowndes' bumper at the conclusion of the race – Lowndes was fourth, Kelly fifth. In the second race, Lowndes came third while Kelly was fourth – again close behind. The points going into the final race of the year were tied. On the second lap of the final race, Kelly pushed Lowndes on the rear bumper while in the high-speed section between Turns 3 and 4, sending Lowndes into a spin, eventually cleaning out both Lowndes and Todd Kelly (Rick's older brother). Rick Kelly was given a drive-through penalty and finished 18th. Lowndes' car was extensively damaged and was only able to salvage 29th place. Rick Kelly had won the championship.

However, Lowndes and his Triple Eight team protested, claiming that Kelly had deliberately taken Lowndes out of the race. The stewards, after deliberation, dismissed the appeal, saying that the drive-through penalty was sufficient punishment for Kelly. Furthermore, Lowndes and Triple Eight accused the HSV Dealer Team and the Holden Racing Team for bad sportsmanship – Mark Skaife was given a bad sportsmanship flag in Race 1 for blocking Lowndes, while Kelly's teammate Garth Tander was given a drive-through penalty for blocking Lowndes in Race 2. Some days later, Lowndes was awarded the prized Barry Sheene Medal, which was some consolation.

=== Team Vodafone ===
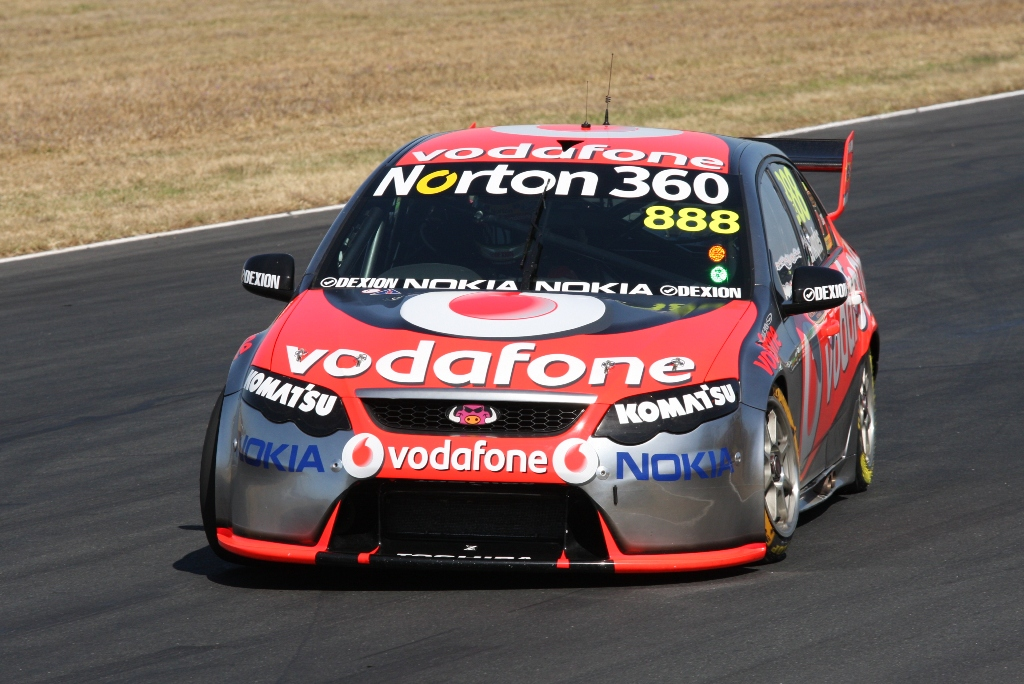
The Ford FG Falcon of Craig Lowndes at Queensland Raceway

In 2007, the team retained the services of Jamie Whincup and Craig Lowndes. Vodafone replaced Betta Electrical as the title sponsor. Whincup narrowly missed out on the Drivers Championship by 2 points, with Garth Tander and Toll HSV Racing Team winning the last race of the season in Phillip Island.

In 2008, Whincup won the championship, and Lowndes and Whincup won their third Bathurst 1000 crown. During the 2008 Season, it was announced at the Hidden Valley round that Ford would withdraw its support from all but two teams (Ford Performance Racing and Stone Brothers Racing) on the Supercars grid from 2009 onwards. Triple Eight was one of the Ford teams to be effected by the decision, despite proving that they were the top Ford team that year and would go on to win their third Bathurst 1000 and first drivers championship as well as being the head developers of the new FG Falcon which was to be introduced in 2009. It was estimated that due to the decision by Ford, Triple Eight lost $2 million from their budget annually.

In 2009, following Ford's decision to withdraw support from all teams other than Ford Performance Racing and Stone Brothers Racing, the Ford logos on the front of the cars were replaced by a stylised pink pig's head, referring to Hog's Breath Cafe, one of the team sponsors. The team ran new FG Falcons. Triple Eight Racing won fifteen of the twenty-three races staged during the championship, with Whincup winning eleven races and the championship and Lowndes taking four wins at Winton, the Gold Coast and Barbagallo, finishing the year in fourth. Due to the loss of factory support from Ford for the 2009 season. Triple Eight announced prior to Bathurst that the team would be controversially switching to arch rival Holden for 2010 onwards.

==== Change to Holden ====
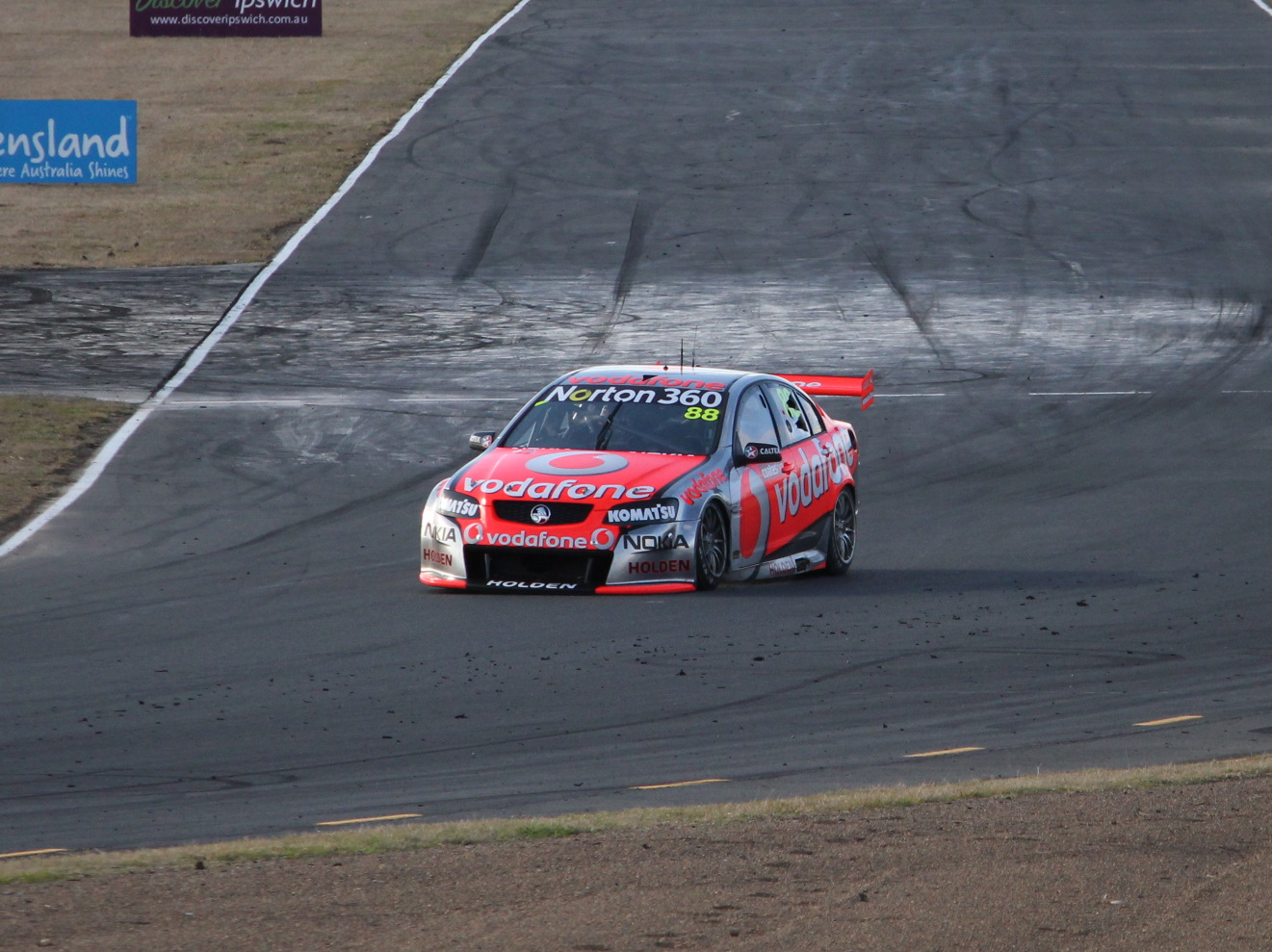
The Holden VE Commodore of Jamie Whincup at Queensland Raceway

In 2010 the team switched to racing Holden VE Commodores in response to the withdrawal of Ford's support, after signing a three-year deal with Holden. The team also re-signed with major sponsor Vodafone for another three years until the end of the 2012 season.

The team celebrated the first race of the year with a 1–2 finish with Jamie Whincup and Craig Lowndes respectively. Jamie Whincup won both races in Abu Dhabi, Bahrain, and Hamilton, but lost the championship lead after troubled races at Queensland Raceway and Winton, while teammate Craig Lowndes finished on the podium several times. They also had a great result at Bathurst with a 1–2 finish with Craig Lowndes, Mark Skaife and Jamie Whincup, Steve Owen respectively. Whincup finished the year in 2nd, with Lowndes in 4th.

In 2011, Whincup regained the championship from Lowndes with the team winning the Teams Championship.

During the 2012 season, Triple Eight dominated, winning 19 races including the Sandown 500 (Lowndes and Warren Luff) and the Bathurst 1000 (Whincup and Paul Dumbrell) with Whincup won the title from Lowndes.

=== Red Bull Racing Australia ===
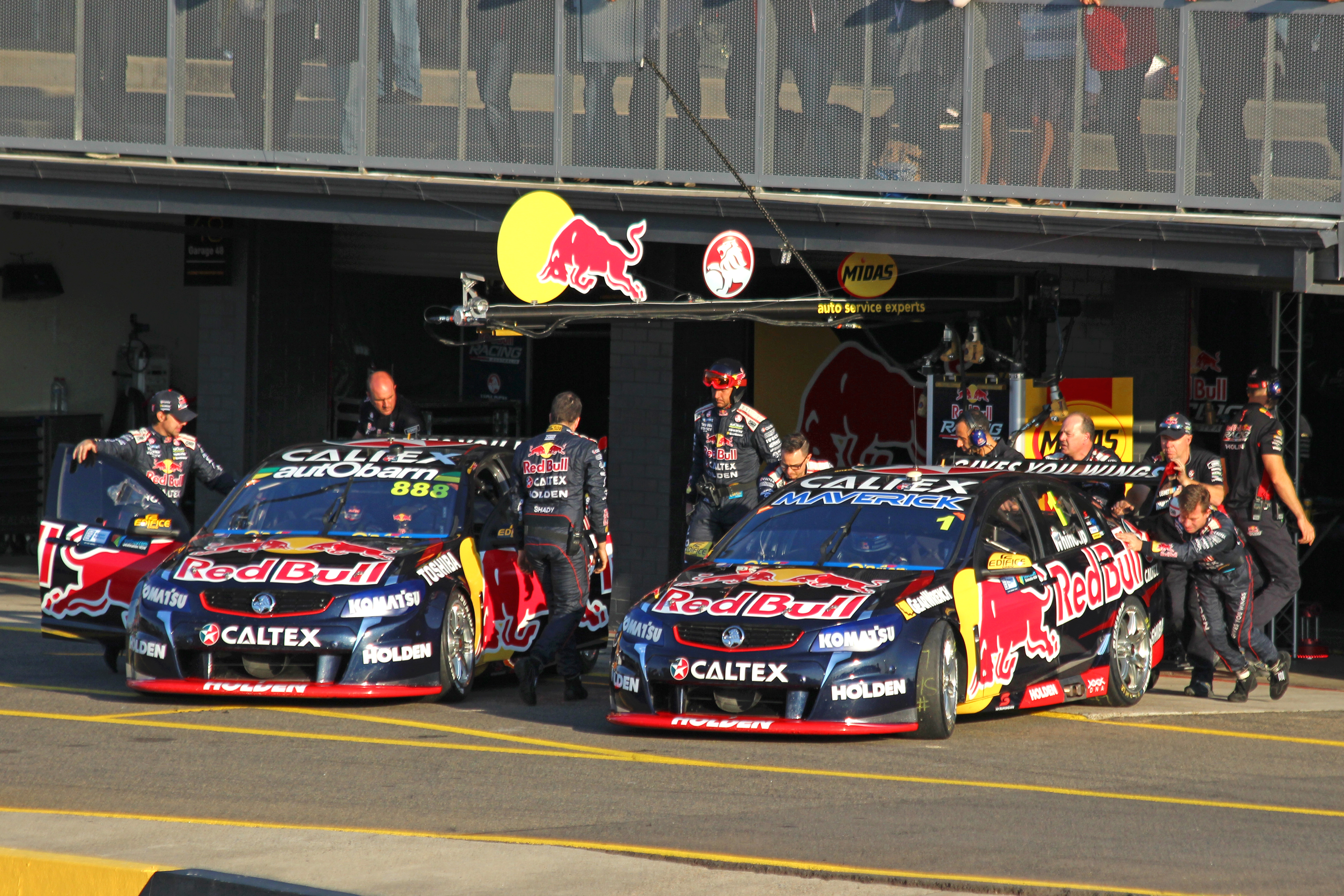
The team's Holden VF Commodores at Sydney Motorsport Park in 2015

In June 2012, Vodafone announced it would not renew the sponsorship. In August 2012, Red Bull took over the naming rights for the 2013 V8 Supercars season onwards.

In the 2013 season, the new Car of the Future specification cars were introduced with Triple Eight racing the new Holden VF Commodore. Whincup and Lowndes finished first and second in the championship.

In 2016, a third car was added for Shane van Gisbergen, with the team purchasing a Racing Entitlement Contract that was last used in 2014 by James Rosenberg Racing. Van Gisbergen won the 2016 championship.

=== Team Vortex ===
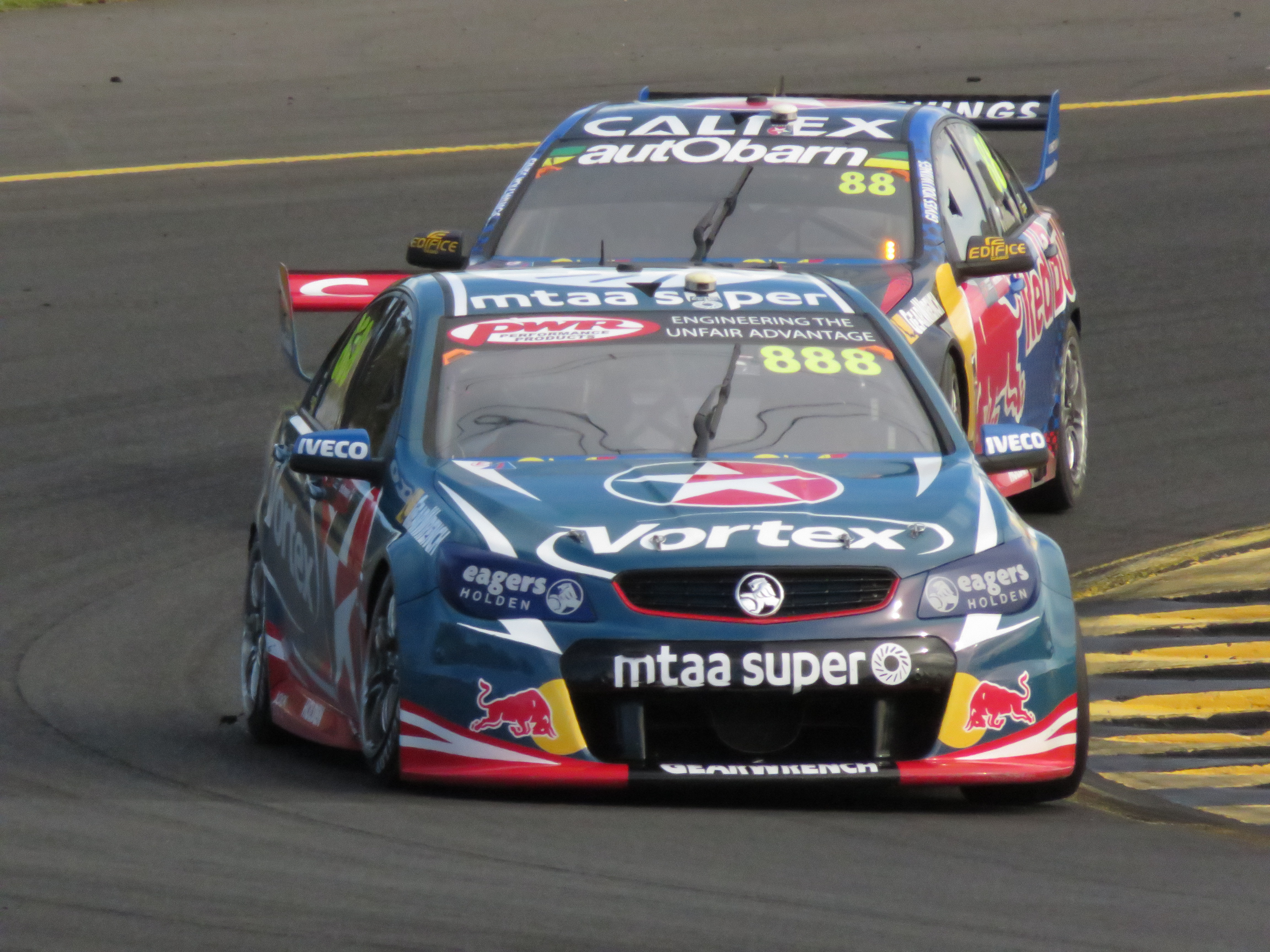
The team expanded to three cars in 2016, Lowndes in Team Vortex colours pictured

In 2016 and 2017, Lowndes raced under the banner of Team Vortex, with Whincup and van Gisbergen under the Red Bull Racing Australia banner.

=== Autobarn Lowndes Racing ===
In 2018, Lowndes raced under the banner of Autobarn Lowndes Racing, with Whincup and van Gisbergen under the Red Bull Holden Racing Team banner.

=== Red Bull Holden Racing Team ===
The team was branded as the Red Bull Holden Racing Team from 2017 until 2020

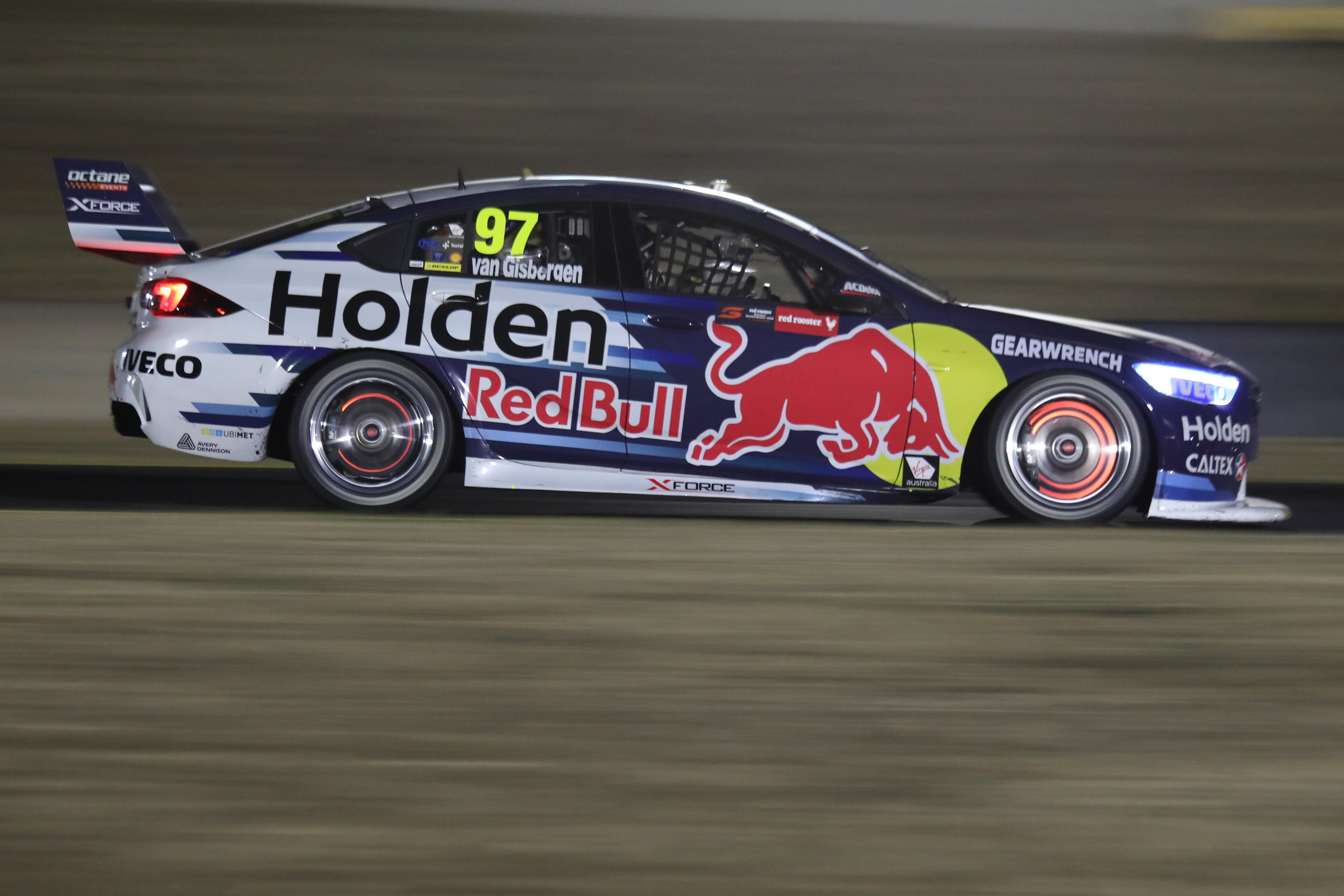
Holden ZB Commodore in 2018

From 2017 until 2020, Triple Eight was the factory Holden team being rebranded as the Red Bull Holden Racing Team. The team was responsible for developing the ZB Commodore that debut in 2018. They also lead development for the expected V6 twin-turbo engine that was to be the replacement to the V8 engine in the future, all without the guidance of former technical director Ludo Lacroix. However, in April 2018, Holden announced it had chosen to halt the development of the turbocharged V6 engine and that it would be sticking with its V8 layout for the time being. This meant that the scheduled wildcard entry the team was planning to enter never happened.

=== Red Bull Ampol Racing ===
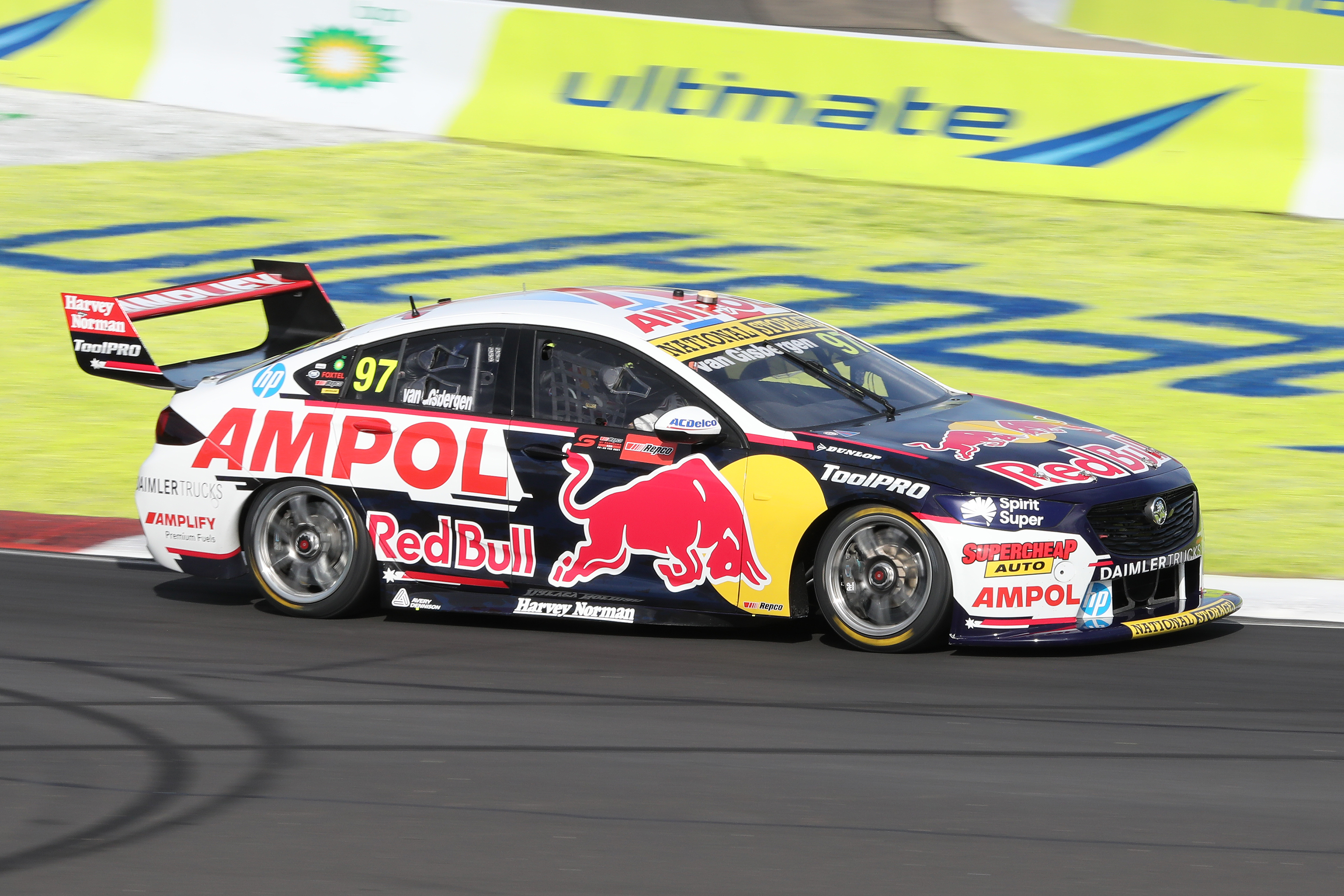
Holden ZB Commodore of Shane van Gisbergen in 2021

For 2021 and beyond, Triple Eight rebranded to Red Bull Ampol Racing due to the Holden brand being retired at the end of 2020. This was the first time that Triple Eight raced without factory support from Holden since joining the brand in 2010 and only the second time in its V8 Supercars history without any factory support (the last time being 2009). Ampol, formerly known as Caltex Australia, replaced Holden as one of Triple Eight's major sponsors alongside longtime partner Red Bull.

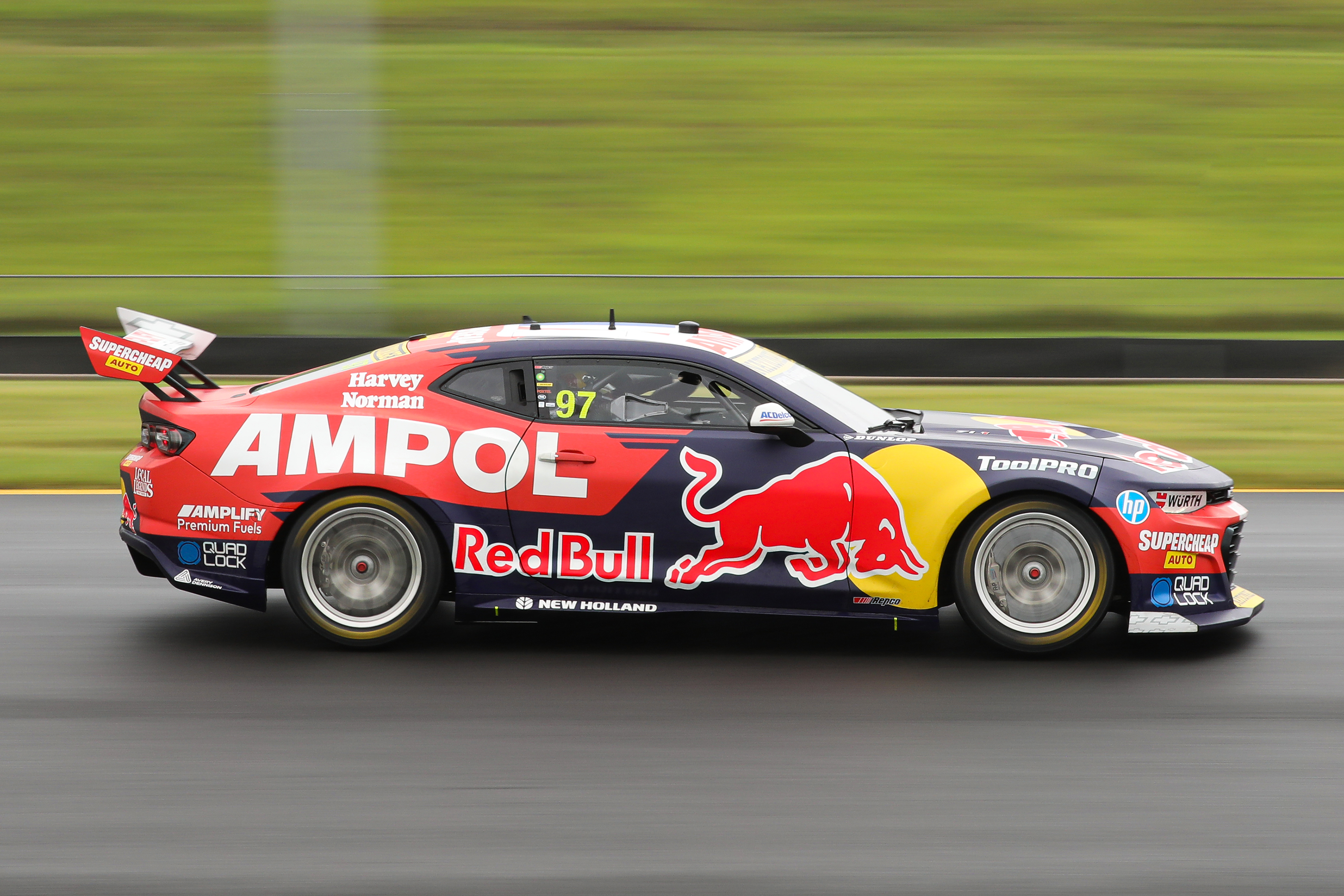
Chevrolet Camaro of van Gisbergen in 2023

Despite the name change, Triple Eight continued with Holden Commodores for both 2021 and 2022. The Chevrolet Camaro made its debut in 2023 along with Gen3. Jamie Whincup retired after 2021, his 16th and final full time season with Triple Eight, and was replaced by Broc Feeney. Shane van Gisbergen continued to drive for the team.

For 2023 and the new Gen 3 cars, Triple Eight along with all other Holden teams switched to the Chevrolet Camaro ZL1 after General Motors shut down the Holden brand.

For 2024, Shane van Gisbergen announce his move away from V8 Supercars to NASCAR with Trackhouse Racing. Will Brown was brought on to replace him (with the car number changing to 87) and partnered with Broc Feeney.

Triple Eight switched back Ford in the 2026 season, for the first time since 2009.

=== Wildcard entries ===
The team entered an extra car at the 2013 Bathurst 1000, running under the banner of Xbox One Racing and driven by Andy Priaulx and Mattias Ekström. They qualified in 18th and finished in 10th.

For the 2021 Bathurst 1000 the team ran a Supercheap Auto backed Holden ZB Commodore which was driven by former Super3 Champion Broc Feeney and former Supercars champion Russell Ingall.

For the 2022 Bathurst 1000 they ran a Holden ZB Commodore under the banner Supercheap Auto Racing and was driven by 3x Supercars champion and 7x Bathurst 1000 winner Craig Lowndes and current Supercars driver Declan Fraser.

For the 2023 season they ran a single Chevrolet Camaro ZL1 for Zane Goddard at the Darwin Triple Crown and with Craig Lowndes for Sandown and Bathurst.

For the 2024 season they ran a single Chevrolet Camaro ZL1 for Cooper Murray at the Darwin Triple Crown and teamed up with Craig Lowndes at Sandown and Bathurst.

For the 2025 season they ran a single Chevrolet Camaro ZL1 for Zach Bates at the Ipswich Super 440 and teamed up with Craig Lowndes at The Bend and Bathurst.

== Development series ==
Triple Eight have previously entered cars in the Development Series for Andrew Thompson in 2011, Scott Pye in 2012 and Casey Stoner in 2013, winning the series in 2011. Since 2014 Triple Eight has provided technical assistance to Eggleston Motorsport. For the 2019 season Triple Eight re-entered the development series, Super2. Fielding two cars for Brenton Grove and Kurt Kostecki. For the 2020 season they scaled the team down to one car driven by 2019 Australian Formula Ford Champion Angelo Mouzouris. For the 2021 season they went back to a two car operation with Angelo Mouzouris being joined by ex-Tickford Super2 driver Broc Feeney.

== Car supplier ==
As well as building cars for its own use, Triple Eight has also built cars for other teams. It has provided chassis for Dick Johnson Racing (2009–2012), Paul Morris Motorsport (2010–2012), Tekno Autosports (2010–2021), Lucas Dumbrell Motorsport (2012–2017), Team 18 (2016–2025), Matt Stone Racing (2018–2022),, PremiAir Racing (2022–2025) and SCT Motorsport from 2026 onwards.

== Ownership ==
Originally affiliated with champion British Touring Car Championship race team Triple Eight Racing and owned by Peter Butterly, Roland Dane, Ian Harrison and Derek Warwick, Dane later took majority ownership, with Harrison maintaining a minority shareholding. In late 2015, Dane sold a 30% shareholding in the team to Paul Dumbrell, Tim Miles and Trinette Schipkie, whilst his daughter Jessica and Jamie Whincup also bought minority stakes over the following years.

In 2021, Roland Dane stepped down from his role as team principal in favour of retiring full-time driver Whincup, taking up a non-executive chairman role and selling his remaining shares in the business to Whincup and Jessica Dane. New Zealand-based Scottish millionaire Tony Quinn additionally bought a 40% share of the team.

In July 2024, Jessica Dane sold her shares in Triple Eight to team sponsors Earl Evans and Steven Blackmore, moving to the United States and taking up a role in General Motors' motorsport department. In December 2024, Roland Dane stepped down as non-executive chairman and was replaced with Quinn's business partner Rex Devantier.

== Supercar drivers ==
The following is a list of drivers who have driven for the team in the Supercars Championship, in order of their first appearance. Drivers who only drove for the team on a part-time basis are listed in italics.

- (New Zealand) Paul Radisich (2003–04)
- (Australia) Dean Canto (2003–04)
- (Sweden) Rickard Rydell (2003)
- (Brazil) Max Wilson (2004)
- (France) Yvan Muller (2004–05)
- (Australia) Steven Ellery (2005)
- (Australia) Craig Lowndes (2005–25)
- (Australia) Adam Macrow (2005)
- (Australia) Jamie Whincup (2006–present)
- (Denmark) Allan Simonsen (2006–07, 2009)
- (United Kingdom) Richard Lyons (2006–07, 2012)
- (Italy) Fabrizio Giovanardi (2008)
- (United Kingdom) Marc Hynes (2008)
- (United Kingdom) James Thompson (2009)
- (Australia) Steve Owen (2010)
- (Australia) Mark Skaife (2010–11)
- (United Kingdom) Andy Priaulx (2010–11, 2013)
- (Australia) Andrew Thompson (2011)
- (France) Sébastien Bourdais (2011–12)
- (Australia) Paul Dumbrell (2012–18)
- (Australia) Warren Luff (2012–13)
- (Sweden) Mattias Ekström (2013)
- (New Zealand) Steven Richards (2014–18)
- (New Zealand) Shane van Gisbergen (2016–23)
- (France) Alexandre Prémat (2016)
- (Australia) Matt Campbell (2017)
- (New Zealand) Earl Bamber (2018)
- (Australia) Garth Tander (2019–22)
- (Australia) Broc Feeney (2021–present)
- (Australia) Russell Ingall (2021)
- (Australia) Declan Fraser (2022)
- (New Zealand) Richie Stanaway (2023)
- (Australia) Zane Goddard (2023)
- (Australia) Will Brown (2024–present)
- (Australia) Scott Pye (2024–present)
- (Australia) Cooper Murray (2024)
- (Australia) Zach Bates (2025)
- (Australia) Jackson Walls (2026–present)
- (Australia) Nick Percat (2026–present)
- (Australia) Jack Perkins (2026–present)

== Super2 drivers ==
The following is a list of drivers who have driven for the team in the Super2 Series, in order of their first appearance. Drivers who drove for the team on a part-time basis are listed in Italics

- (Australia) Andrew Thompson (2011)
- (Australia) Scott Pye (2012)
- (Australia) Casey Stoner (2013)
- (Australia) Kurt Kostecki (2019)
- (Australia) Brenton Grove (2019)
- (Australia) Angelo Mouzouris (2020–21)
- (Australia) Broc Feeney (2021)
- (Australia) Cameron Hill (2022)
- (Australia) Declan Fraser (2022)
- (Australia) Jackson Walls (2025)
- (Australia) Ben Gomersall (2025)

== GT3/GT4 drivers ==
- (Australia) Jamie Whincup (2019–2023)
- (Australia) Craig Lowndes (2019)
- (New Zealand) Shane van Gisbergen (2019–2023)
- (Malaysia) Prince Jeffri Ibrahim (2019–2024)
- (Malaysia) Jazeman Jaafar (2019, 2022–2024)
- (Germany) Maximilian Götz (2020, 2023)
- (Australia) Nick Foster (2020, 2022)
- (Australia) Yasser Shahin (2020)
- (Australia) Anton De Pasquale (2020)
- (Australia) Sam Shahin (2020)
- (Malaysia) Prince Abu Bakar Ibrahim (2022–2024)
- (Australia) Broc Feeney (2022–present)
- (Australia) Kenny Habul (2022)
- (Austria) Martin Konrad (2022)
- (Andorra) Jules Gounon (2022)
- (Germany) Luca Stolz (2022–2024)
- (New Zealand) Richie Stanaway (2023)
- (Australia) Jordan Love (2023–2024)
- (Canada) Mikael Grenier (2023)
- (Australia) Declan Fraser (2024)
- (Australia) Peter Hackett (2024)
- (Australia) Summer Rintoule (2025)
- (Australia) Jarrod Hughes (2025)

== Complete Supercars results ==
=== Car No. 1 results ===
Year	Driver	No.	Make	1	2	3	4	5	6	7	8	9	10	11	12	13	14	15	16	17	18	19	20	21	22	23	24	25	26	27	28	29	30	31	32	33	34	35	36	37	38	39	Position	Pts
2016	Shane van Gisbergen	97	Holden	ADE; R1; 3	ADE; R2; 5	ADE; R3; 10	SYM; R4; 1	SYM; R5; Ret	PHI; R6; 4	PHI; R7; 10	BAR; R8; 2	BAR; R9; 4	WIN; R10; 9	WIN; R11; 4	**HID**; **R12**; **16**	**HID**; **R13**; **1**	TOW; R14; 2	TOW; R15; 1	QLD; R16; 1	QLD; R17; 12	SMP; R18; 1	SMP; R19; 5	SAN; QR; 9	SAN; R20; 2	BAT; R21; 2	**SUR**; **R22**; **1**	SUR; R23; 2	**PUK**; **R24**; **2**	**PUK**; **R25**; **1**	**PUK**; **R26**; **3**	PUK; R27; 2	**SYD**; **R28**; **3**	SYD; R29; 1										1st	3368
2017	Shane van Gisbergen	97	Holden	**ADE**; **R1**; **1**	**ADE**; **R2**; **1**	SYM; R3; 1	SYM; R4; 9	PHI; R5; 4	PHI; R6; 16	BAR; R7; 4	BAR; R8; 6	WIN; R9; 8	WIN; R10; 1	HID; R11; Ret	HID; R12; 3	TOW; R13; 7	TOW; R14; 3	QLD; R15; 3	QLD; R16; 3	SMP; R17; 23	SMP; R18; 3	SAN; QR; 19	SAN; R19; 15	BAT; R20; 5	SUR; R21; 4	**SUR**; **R22**; **3**	PUK; R23; 1	PUK; R24; 24	NEW; R25; 16	NEW; R26; 2													4th	2769
2018	Shane van Gisbergen	97	Holden	**ADE**; **R1**; **1**	**ADE**; **R2**; **1**	MEL; R3; 4	MEL; R4; 4	MEL; R5; 13	MEL; R6; 13	**SYM**; **R7**; **6**	SYM; R8; 25	PHI; R9; 3	PHI; R10; 6	BAR; R11; 3	**BAR**; **R12**; **5**	WIN; R13; 3	WIN; R14; 2	HID; R15; 2	HID; R16; 4	TOW; R17; 2	TOW; R18; 1	QLD; R19; 2	QLD; R20; 1	SMP; R21; 1	BEN; R22; 1	BEN; R23; 2	SAN; QR; 11	SAN; R24; 2	BAT; R25; 5	SUR; R26; 10	SUR; R27; C	PUK; R28; 1	PUK; R29; 2	**NEW**; **R30**; **5**	NEW; R31; 4								2nd	3873
2019	Shane van Gisbergen	97	Holden	ADE; R1; 3	ADE; R2; 3	MEL; R3; Ret	MEL; R4; 10	MEL; R5; 21	MEL; R6; 22	SYM; R7; 3	**SYM**; **R8**; 1	PHI; R9; 6	PHI; R10; 7	BAR; R11; 5	BAR; R12; 5	WIN; R13; 5	WIN; R14; 7	HID; R15; 8	HID; R16; 10	TOW; R17; 4	TOW; R18; 1	QLD; R19; 5	QLD; R20; 2	BEN; R21; 6	BEN; R22; 6	**PUK**; **R23**; 1	PUK; R24; 2	BAT; R25; 2	SUR; R26; 2	**SUR**; **R27**; 1	SAN; QR; Ret	SAN; R28; 17	**NEW**; **R29**; 1	NEW; R30; 7									2nd	3310
2020	Shane van Gisbergen	97	Holden	ADE; R1; 3	**ADE**; **R2**; Ret	**MEL**; **R3**; C	MEL; R4; C	MEL; R5; C	MEL; R6; C	SMP1; R7; 2	SMP1; R8; 7	SMP1; R9; 6	SMP2; R10; 4	SMP2; R11; 8	SMP2; R12; 12	HID1; R13; 11	HID1; R14; 4	HID1; R15; 3	HID2; R16; 8	HID2; R17; 2	**HID2**; **R18**; 5	TOW1; R19; 19	TOW1; R20; 3	TOW1; R21; 8	TOW2; R22; Ret	TOW2; R23; 1	TOW2; R24; 1	BEN1; R25; 9	BEN1; R26; 1	BEN1; R27; 14	BEN2; R28; 2	BEN2; R29; 5	BEN2; R30; 5	BAT; R31; 1									3rd	2095
2021	Shane van Gisbergen	97	Holden	BAT1; R1; 1	**BAT1**; **R2**; 1	SAN; R3; 1	**SAN**; **R4**; 1	**SAN**; **R5**; 1	**SYM**; **R6**; 1	SYM; R7; 2	SYM; R8; 6	BEN; R9; 7	BEN; R10; 3	BEN; R11; 2	HID; R12; 13	HID; R13; 1	HID; R14; 1	**TOW1**; **R15**; 1	TOW1; R16; 1	TOW2; R17; 6	TOW2; R18; 1	TOW2; R19; 2	SMP1; R20; 2	SMP1; R21; 1	SMP1; R22; 4	SMP2; R23; 1	SMP2; R24; 2	**SMP2**; **R25**; 23	SMP3; R26; 2	SMP3; R27; 3	SMP3; R28; 3	SMP4; R29; 1	SMP4; R30; C	BAT2; R31; 18									1st	2930
2022	Shane van Gisbergen	97	Holden	SMP; R1; 1	SMP; R2; 6	SYM; R3; 1	**SYM**; **R4**; 1	SYM; R5; 1	MEL; R6; 3	MEL; R7; 1	MEL; R8; 1	MEL; R9; 20	BAR; R10; 1	BAR; R11; 5	**BAR**; **R12**; 1	**WIN**; **R13**; 2	WIN; R14; 1	WIN; R15; 2	HID; R16; 3	HID; R17; 3	HID; R18; 21	**TOW**; **R19**; 1	TOW; R20; 1	BEN; R21; 1	BEN; R22; 1	BEN; R23; 1	SAN; R24; 2	**SAN**; **R25**; 1	SAN; R26; 1	PUK; R27; 5	**PUK**; **R28**; 1	PUK; R29; 1	BAT; R30; 1	SUR; R31; 1	**SUR**; **R32**; 1	ADE; R33; 20	ADE; R34; 7						1st	3523
2023	Shane van Gisbergen	97	Chevrolet	NEW; R1; DSQ	NEW; R2; 1	MEL; R3; 1	**MEL**; **R4**; **2**	MEL; R5; 2	MEL; R6; 4	**BAR**; **R7**; **1**	BAR; R8; 5	BAR; R9; 12	SYM; R10; 3	SYM; R11; Ret	SYM; R12; 4	HID; R13; 6	HID; R14; 2	HID; R15; 4	TOW; R16; 4	TOW; R17; 5	SMP; R18; 7	SMP; R19; 1	BEN; R20; 5	BEN; R21; 5	BEN; R22; 5	SAN; R23; 3	BAT; R24; 1	SUR; R25; 2	SUR; R26; 5	ADE; R27; Ret	ADE; R28; Ret												2nd	2565
2024	Will Brown	87	Chevrolet	**BAT1**; **R1**; **2**	BAT1; R2; 1	MEL; R3; 2	MEL; R4; 1	MEL; R5; 2	MEL; R6; 2	TAU; R7; 9	TAU; R8; 1	BAR; R9; 2	BAR; R10; 3	HID; R11; 3	HID; R12; 2	TOW; R13; 3	TOW; R14; 24	SMP; R15; 6	SMP; R16; 3	SYM; R17; 7	SYM; R18; 2	SAN; R19; 1	BAT2; R20; 3	SUR; R21; 7	SUR; R22; 2	ADE; R23; 2	ADE; R24; 1																1st	3060
2025	Will Brown	1	Chevrolet	SMP; R1; 5	SMP; R2; 3	SMP; R3; 2	MEL; R4; 2	MEL; R5; 3	MEL; R6; 1	MEL; R7; C	TAU; R8; 5	TAU; R9; 7	TAU; R10; 8	SYM; R11; 5	SYM; R12; 11	**SYM**; **R13**; **3**	BAR; R14; 2	BAR; R15; 2	BAR; R16; 5	HID; R17; 8	HID; R18; 7	HID; R19; 5	TOW; R20; 10	TOW; R21; 4	TOW; R22; 2	QLD; R23; 4	QLD; R24; 1	QLD; R25; 23	BEN; R26; 4	BAT; R27; 17	SUR; R28; 5	SUR; R29; 8	SAN; R30; 2	SAN; R31; 3	ADE; R32; 9	ADE; R33; 4	ADE; R34; 3						2nd	5244

=== Car No. 88 results ===
(Races in bold indicate pole position) (Races in italics indicate fastest lap)

Supercars results
Year	Driver	Rds	Make	1	2	3	4	5	6	7	8	9	10	11	12	13	14	15	16	17	18	19	20	21	22	23	24	25	26	27	28	29	30	31	32	33	34	35	36	37	38	39	Position	Pts
2004	Paul Radisich	All	Ford	ADE; R1; Ret	ADE; R2; 7	EAS; R3; 20	PUK; R4; 3	PUK; R5; 16	PUK; R6; 11	HDV; R7; 9	HDV; R8; 16	HDV; R9; 25	BAR; R10; Ret	BAR; R11; Ret	BAR; R12; 29	QLD; R13; 6	WIN; R14; 19	ORA; R15; 14	ORA; R16; 13	SAN; R17; Ret	BAT; R18; Ret	SUR; R19; 12	SUR; R20; 7	SYM; R21; 9	SYM; R22; 21	SYM; R23; 14	EAS; R24; 6	EAS; R25; 2	EAS; R26; 4														19th	1188
2005	Steven Ellery	All	Ford	ADE; R1; Ret	ADE; R2; DNS	PUK; R3; 4	PUK; R4; 7	PUK; R5; 22	BAR; R6; 30	BAR; R7; 13	BAR; R8; 10	EAS; R9; 28	EAS; R10; 8	SHA; R11; 15	SHA; R12; 24	SHA; R13; 27	HDV; R14; 28	HDV; R15; 13	HDV; R16; 6	QLD; R17; 7	ORA; R18; DNS	ORA; R19; DNS	SAN; R20; 5	BAT; R21; 3	SUR; R22; 7	SUR; R23; 7	SUR; R24; 7	SYM; R25; 9	SYM; R26; 13	SYM; R27; 18	PHI; R28; 8	PHI; R29; 6	PHI; R30; 10										13th	1424
2006	Jamie Whincup	1-7, 10-13	Ford	ADE; R1; 3	ADE; R2; 1	PUK; R3; 15	PUK; R4; Ret	PUK; R5; 10	BAR; R6; 21	BAR; R7; 4	BAR; R8; 9	WIN; R9; 25	WIN; R10; 2	WIN; R11; 9	HDV; R12; 9	HDV; R13; 5	HDV; R14; 26	QLD; R15; 8	QLD; R16; 27	QLD; R17; 8	ORA; R18; 5	ORA; R19; 6	ORA; R20; Ret			SUR; R23; Ret	SUR; R24; 22	SUR; R25; 8	SYM; R26; Ret	SYM; R27; DNS	SYM; R28; DNS	BHR; R29; 10	BHR; R30; 6	BHR; R31; Ret	PHI; R32; 26	PHI; R33; 9	PHI; R34; 7						10th	2357
2006	Richard Lyons	8-9	Ford																					SAN; R21; 17	BAT; R22; 12																			
2007	Jamie Whincup	1-8, 11-14	Ford	ADE; R1; 3	ADE; R2; 5	BAR; R3; 7	BAR; R4; 23	BAR; R5; 18	PUK; R6; 4	PUK; R7; 2	PUK; R8; 5	WIN; R9; 1	**WIN**; **R10**; 2	WIN; R11; 2	EAS; R12; 2	EAS; R13; 3	EAS; R14; EX	HDV; R15; 5	HDV; R16; 4	HDV; R17; 26	**QLD**; **R18**; 4	QLD; R19; 2	QLD; R20; 3	ORA; R21; 3	ORA; R22; Ret	ORA; R23; 4			SUR; R26; 2	SUR; R27; 2	SUR; R28; Ret	BHR; R29; Ret	BHR; R30; 22	BHR; R31; 16	SYM; R32; 2	SYM; R33; 1	**SYM**; **R34**; 1	PHI; R35; 3	PHI; R36; 3	PHI; R37; 2			2nd	623
2007	Richard Lyons	9-10	Ford																								SAN; R24; 10	BAT; R25; 5																
2008	Jamie Whincup	1-8, 11-14	Ford	ADE; R1; 1	**ADE**; **R2**; 1	EAS; R3; 3	EAS; R4; 5	EAS; R5; 4	HAM; R6; DNS	HAM; R7; DNS	HAM; R8; DNS	BAR; R9; 7	BAR; R10; 3	BAR; R11; 3	**SAN**; **R12**; 1	SAN; R13; 3	SAN; R14; 1	HDV; R15; 4	HDV; R16; 5	HDV; R17; 8	QLD; R18; 9	QLD; R19; 3	QLD; R20; 6	WIN; R21; 1	**WIN**; **R22**; 4	WIN; R23; 2				**SUR**; **R26**; 1	**SUR**; **R27**; 1	**SUR**; **R28**; 1	**BHR**; **R29**; 1	BHR; R30; 1	**BHR**; **R31**; 1	SYM; R32; 2	SYM; R33; 1	**SYM**; **R34**; 1	**ORA**; **R35**; 1	**ORA**; **R36**; Ret	ORA; R37; 23		1st	3332
2008	Marc Hynes	9-10	Ford																								PHI; QR; 25	**PHI**; **R24**; 17	BAT; R25; 15															
2011	Jamie Whincup	All	Holden	YMC; R1; 1	YMC; R2; 3	ADE; R3; 2	ADE; R4; 1	**HAM**; **R5**; 23	HAM; R6; 18	**BAR**; **R7**; 1	**BAR**; **R8**; 2	BAR; R9; 1	WIN; R10; 1	WIN; R11; 2	HID; R12; 9	HID; R13; 6	TOW; R14; 2	TOW; R15; 1	QLD; R16; 3	QLD; R17; 2	QLD; R18; 10	PHI; QR; 12	PHI; R19; 2	BAT; R20; 21	**SUR**; **R21**; 1	**SUR**; **R22**; 2	**SYM**; **R23**; 1	SYM; R24; 1	SAN; R25; 13	SAN; R26; 1	SYD; R27; 20	SYD; R28; 8											1st	3168
2016	Jamie Whincup	All	Holden	ADE; R1; 1	ADE; R2; 2	ADE; R3; 14	SYM; R4; 2	SYM; R5; 19	PHI; R6; 2	PHI; R7; 4	BAR; R8; 3	BAR; R9; 11	WIN; R10; 5	WIN; R11; 9	HID; R12; 2	HID; R13; 8	**TOW**; **R14**; 1	TOW; R15; 4	QLD; R16; 2	**QLD**; **R17**; 2	SMP; R18; 2	SMP; R19; 1	SAN; QR; 1	**SAN**; **R20**; 13	**BAT**; **R21**; 11	SUR; R22; 3	**SUR**; **R23**; 1	PUK; R24; 1	PUK; R25; 2	PUK; R26; 25	**PUK**; **R27**; 1	SYD; R28; 1	SYD; R29; 4										2nd	3168
2017	Jamie Whincup	All	Holden	ADE; R1; 6	ADE; R2; 6	SYM; R3; 2	**SYM**; **R4**; 3	PHI; R5; 2	PHI; R6; 18	BAR; R7; 3	BAR; R8; 3	WIN; R9; 2	WIN; R10; 2	HID; R11; 4	HID; R12; 2	TOW; R13; 2	TOW; R14; 1	QLD; R15; 20	QLD; R16; 4	SMP; R17; 3	SMP; R18; 1	SAN; QR; 4	SAN; R19; 6	BAT; R20; 20	SUR; R21; 6	SUR; R22; 2	PUK; R23; 4	**PUK**; **R24**; 1	NEW; R25; 21	NEW; R26; 1													1st	3042
2019	Jamie Whincup	All	Holden	ADE; R1; 2	ADE; R2; 7	MEL; R3; 8	MEL; R4; 4	MEL; R5; 2	MEL; R6; 3	SYM; R7; 25	SYM; R8; 5	PHI; R9; Ret	PHI; R10; 12	BAR; R11; 4	BAR; R12; 2	WIN; R13; 6	WIN; R14; 3	HID; R15; 5	HID; R16; 5	TOW; R17; 2	TOW; R18; Ret	QLD; R19; 1	QLD; R20; 4	BEN; R21; 11	BEN; R22; 5	PUK; R23; 6	**PUK**; **R24**; **16**	BAT; R25	SUR; R26	SUR; R27	**SAN**; **QR**	**SAN**; **R28**	NEW; R29; 8	**NEW**; **R30**; **1**									3rd	3208
2020	Jamie Whincup	All	Holden	**ADE**; **R1**; **1**	ADE; R2; 5	MEL; R3; C	**MEL**; **R4**; **C**	MEL; R5; C	MEL; R6; C	SMP1; R7; 3	**SMP1**; **R8**; **2**	SMP1; R9; 3	SMP2; R10; 5	SMP2; R11; 17	SMP2; R12; 8	HID1; R13; 17	HID1; R14; 2	HID1; R15; 1	**HID2**; **R16**; **2**	HID2; R17; 6	HID2; R18; 7	**TOW1**; **R19**; **1**	**TOW1**; **R20**; **1**	TOW1; R21; 3	TOW2; R22; 4	TOW2; R23; 3	TOW2; R24; 2	BEN1; R25; 18	BEN1; R26; 17	BEN1; R27; 3	BEN2; R28; 10	BEN2; R29; 7	BEN2; R30; 3	BAT; R31									4th	2049
2021	Jamie Whincup	All	Holden	BAT1; R1; 7	BAT1; R2; 6	SAN; R3; 3	SAN; R4; 3	SAN; R5; 4	SYM; R6; 2	SYM; R7; 1	SYM; R8; 5	BEN; R9; 6	BEN; R10; 11	BEN; R11; 4	HID; R12; 12	HID; R13; 3	HID; R14; 3	TOW1; R15; 2	**TOW1**; **R16**; **2**	TOW2; R17; 5	**TOW2**; **R18**; **2**	TOW2; R19; 6	SMP1; R20; 9	SMP1; R21; 6	SMP1; R22; 3	SMP2; R23; 2	SMP2; R24; 25	SMP2; R25; 1	SMP3; R26; 4	SMP3; R27; 2	**SMP3**; **R28**; **2**	SMP4; R29; 2	SMP4; R30; C	BAT2; R31; 4									2nd	2719
2022	Broc Feeney	All	Holden	SMP; R1; 9	SMP; R2; 11	SYM; R3; 5	SYM; R4; 2	SYM; R5; 8	MEL; R6; 8	MEL; R7; 14	MEL; R8; 6	MEL; R9; 12	BAR; R10; 5	BAR; R11; 8	BAR; R12; 11	WIN; R13; 10	WIN; R14; 12	WIN; R15; 7	HID; R16; 8	HID; R17; 13	HID; R18; 6	TOW; R19; 7	TOW; R20; 6	BEN; R21; 7	BEN; R22; 6	BEN; R23; 5	SAN; R24; 14	SAN; R25; 10	SAN; R26; 3	PUK; R27; 7	PUK; R28; 8	PUK; R29; 4	BAT; R30; 5	SUR; R31; 14	SUR; R32; Ret	ADE; R33; 8	ADE; R34; 1						6th	2377
2023	Broc Feeney	All	Chevrolet	NEW; R1; DSQ	NEW; R2; 5	MEL; R3; 4	MEL; R4; 3	MEL; R5; 7	**MEL**; **R6**; **1**	BAR; R7; 10	BAR; R8; 13	**BAR**; **R9**; **1**	SYM; R10; 18	SYM; R11; 1	SYM; R12; 2	HID; R13; 2	**HID**; **R14**; **1**	HID; R15; 3	TOW; R16; 2	TOW; R17; 4	SMP; R18; 11	SMP; R19; 4	BEN; R20; 6	BEN; R21; 9	BEN; R22; 25	SAN; R23; 1	BAT; R24; 23	SUR; R25; 14	SUR; R26; 8	ADE; R27; 5	ADE; R28; 2												3rd	2441
2024	Broc Feeney	All	Chevrolet	BAT1; R1; 1	**BAT1**; **R2**; **3**	MEL; R3; 1	MEL; R4; 4	MEL; R5; 1	MEL; R6; 3	TAU; R7; 21	TAU; R8; 2	BAR; R9; 5	BAR; R10; 7	HID; R11; 1	**HID**; **R12**; **1**	TOW; R13; 7	TOW; R14; 7	SMP; R15; 9	SMP; R16; 11	**SYM**; **R17**; **3**	SYM; R18; 15	SAN; R19; 2	BAT2; R20; 2	SUR; R21; 3	SUR; R22; 3	ADE; R23; 1	**ADE**; **R24**; **7**																2nd	2838
2025	Broc Feeney	All	Chevrolet	SMP; R1; 14	SMP; R2; 2	SMP; R3; 5	**MEL**; **R4**; 1	**MEL**; **R5**; 4	**MEL**; **R6**; 2	**MEL**; **R7**; C	TAU; R8; 15	TAU; R9; 5	TAU; R10; 7	SYM; R11; 1	**SYM**; **R12**; 1	SYM; R13; 2	BAR; R14; 4	BAR; R15; 1	**BAR**; **R16**; 1	**HID**; **R17**; 1	**HID**; **R18**; 1	**HID**; **R19**; 1	TOW; R20; 8	TOW; R21; 1	**TOW**; **R22**; **1**	**QLD**; **R23**; **1**	**QLD**; **R24**; **2**	**QLD**; **R25**; **1**	**BEN**; **R26**; **19**	BAT; R27; 6	SUR; R28; 2	**SUR**; **R29**; **2**	SAN; R30; 4	**SAN**; **R31**; **1**	**ADE**; **R32**; **4**	**ADE**; **R33**; **1**	**ADE**; **R34**; **20**						3rd	5240
2026	Broc Feeney	All	Ford	SMP; R1; 1	SMP; R2; 6	SMP; R3; 1	MEL; R4; 3	MEL; R5; 7	**MEL**; **R6**; **1**	MEL; R7; Ret	TAU; R8; 4	TAU; R9; 2	CHR; R10; 10	CHR; R11; 5	CHR; R12; 2	CHR; R13; 3	SYM; R14; 4	SYM; R15; 2	**SYM**; **R16**; **1**	HID; R17; 14	HID; R18; 7	HID; R19; 5	TOW; R20	TOW; R21	TOW; R22	BAR; R23	BAR; R24	BAR; R25	QLD; R26	QLD; R27	QLD; R28	BEN; R28	BAT; R30	SUR; R31	SUR; R32	SAN; R33	SAN; R34	ADE; R35	ADE; R36	ADE; R37			1st*	1390*

=== Car No. 888 results ===
Year	Driver	No.	Make	1	2	3	4	5	6	7	8	9	10	11	12	13	14	15	16	17	18	19	20	21	22	23	24	25	26	27	28	29	30	31	32	33	34	35	36	37	38	39	Position	Pts
2003	Dean Canto	66	Ford	ADE; R1	ADE; R1	PHI; R3	EAS; R4	WIN; R5	BAR; R6	BAR; R7	BAR; R8	HDV; R9	HDV; R10	HDV; R11	QLD; R12	ORA; R13	SAN; R14; 14	BAT; R15; Ret	SUR; R16; Ret	SUR; R17; 24	PUK; R18; 17	PUK; R19; 14	PUK; R20; 25	EAS; R21; 15	EAS; R22; 9																		24th	1001
2004	Max Wilson	888	Ford	ADE; R1; Ret	ADE; R2; Ret	EAS; R3; 10	PUK; R4; 5	PUK; R5; 28	PUK; R6; 17	HDV; R7; 10	HDV; R8; Ret	HDV; R9; 22	BAR; R10; 16	BAR; R11; 23	BAR; R12; 17	QLD; R13; 14	WIN; R14; Ret	ORA; R15; Ret	ORA; R16; Ret	SAN; R17; Ret	BAT; R18; Ret	SUR; R19; 8	SUR; R20; 5	SYM; R21; 26	SYM; R22; 15	SYM; R23; 15	EAS; R24; 22	EAS; R25; 8	EAS; R26; 11														28th	865
2005	Craig Lowndes	888	Ford	ADE; R1; 3	ADE; R2; 2	PUK; R3; 14	PUK; R4; 5	PUK; R5; Ret	BAR; R6; 21	BAR; R7; 3	BAR; R8; Ret	EAS; R9; 2	EAS; R10; 1	SHA; R11; 4	SHA; R12; Ret	SHA; R13; Ret	HDV; R14; 3	HDV; R15; 32	HDV; R16; 11	QLD; R17; 1	ORA; R18; 9	ORA; R19; 4	SAN; R20; 1	BAT; R21; 15	SUR; R22; 2	SUR; R23; 1	SUR; R24; 1	SYM; R25; 5	SYM; R26; 3	SYM; R27; 3	PHI; R28; 1	PHI; R29; 3	PHI; R30; 15										2nd	1865
2006	Craig Lowndes	888	Ford	ADE; R1; 1	**ADE**; **R2**; **Ret**	PUK; R3; 5	PUK; R4; 17	PUK; R5; 2	BAR; R6; 3	BAR; R7; 14	BAR; R8; 2	WIN; R9; 2	WIN; R10; 8	WIN; R11; 1	HDV; R12; 4	HDV; R13; 3	HDV; R14; 1	QLD; R15; 4	QLD; R16; 5	QLD; R17; 4	ORA; R18; 2	ORA; R19; 2	ORA; R20; 1	SAN; R21; 3	BAT; R22; 1	SUR; R23; 11	SUR; R24; 7	SUR; R25; 14	SYM; R26; 27	SYM; R27; 9	SYM; R28; 7	BHR; R29; 9	BHR; R30; 5	BHR; R31; 3	PHI; R32; 4	PHI; R33; 3	PHI; R34; 29						2nd	3271
2007	Craig Lowndes	888	Ford	ADE; R1; 13	ADE; R2; 11	BAR; R3; 4	BAR; R4; 8	BAR; R5; 8	PUK; R6; 14	PUK; R7; 7	PUK; R8; 4	WIN; R9; 18	WIN; R10; 6	WIN; R11; 5	EAS; R12; 9	EAS; R13; 4	EAS; R14; 2	HDV; R15; 3	HDV; R16; 1	**HDV**; **R17**; **1**	QLD; R18; 5	QLD; R19; 3	QLD; R20; 2	ORA; R21; 7	ORA; R22; 1	**ORA**; **R23**; **14**	SAN; R24; 1	BAT; R25; 1	SUR; R26; 3	SUR; R27; 24	SUR; R28; 7	BHR; R29; Ret	BHR; R30; 5	BHR; R31; 1	SYM; R32; 5	SYM; R33; 6	SYM; R34; 5	PHI; R35; 4	PHI; R36; 6	PHI; R37; 3			3rd	592
2008	Craig Lowndes	888	Ford	ADE; R1; 3	ADE; R2; Ret	EAS; R3; 7	EAS; R4; 3	EAS; R5; 8	HAM; R6; 19	HAM; R7; 14	HAM; R8; 7	BAR; R29; 5	BAR; R10; 4	BAR; R11; 4	SAN; R12; 3	SAN; R13; 1	**SAN**; **R14**; **DNS**	HDV; R15; 5	HDV; R16; 4	HDV; R17; Ret	QLD; R18; 28	QLD; R19; 12	QLD; R20; 7	WIN; R21; 1	**WIN**; **R22**; **5**	WIN; R23; 6	PHI; QR; 1	**PHI**; **R24**; **2**	BAT; R25; 1	SUR; R26; 6	SUR; R27; 9	SUR; R28; 9	BHR; R29; 2	BHR; R30; 3	BHR; R31; 3	SYM; R32; 6	SYM; R33; 2	SYM; R34; 2	ORA; R35; 2	ORA; R36; 5	ORA; R37; 3		4th	2871
2009	Craig Lowndes	888	Ford	ADE; R1; 19	ADE; R2; 4	HAM; R3; 24	HAM; R4; Ret	WIN; R5; 1	WIN; R6; 1	SYM; R7; 7	SYM; R8; 10	HDV; R9; 6	HDV; R10; 3	TOW; R11; 4	TOW; R12; 9	SAN; R13; 3	SAN; R14; 5	QLD; R15; Ret	QLD; R16; 2	PHI; QR; 18	PHI; R17; 2	BAT; R18; 5	SUR; R19; 4	SUR; R20; 4	SUR; R21; 1	**SUR**; **R22**; **13**	PHI; R23; 28	PHI; R24; 7	**BAR**; **R25**; **6**	BAR; R26; 1	SYD; R27; 19	SYD; R28; Ret											4th	2592
2010	Craig Lowndes	888	Holden	YMC; R1; 2	YMC; R2; 5	BHR; R3; 3	BHR; R4; 12	ADE; R5; 19	ADE; R6; 16	HAM; R7; 4	HAM; R8; 19	QLD; R9; 2	QLD; R10; 5	WIN; R11; 2	WIN; R12; 2	HDV; R13; 7	HDV; R14; 5	TOW; R15; 26	TOW; R16; Ret	PHI; QR; 2	PHI; R17; 1	BAT; R18; 1	SUR; R19; 2	SUR; R20; 10	SYM; R21; 1	SYM; R22; Ret	SAN; R23; 8	SAN; R24; 11	SYD; R25; Ret	SYD; R26; 6													4th	2669
2011	Craig Lowndes	888	Holden	**YMC**; **R1**; **7**	YMC; R2; 21	ADE; R3; 3	ADE; R4; 12	HAM; R5; 2	HAM; R6; 10	BAR; R7; 2	BAR; R8; 4	BAR; R9; 4	**WIN**; **R10**; **11**	WIN; R11; 7	HID; R12; 3	HID; R13; 2	TOW; R14; 4	**TOW**; **R15**; **2**	**QLD**; **R16**; **1**	**QLD**; **R17**; **1**	**QLD**; **R18**; **1**	PHI; QR; 6	PHI; R19; 1	BAT; R20; 2	SUR; R21; Ret	SUR; R22; 20	SYM; R23; 2	SYM; R24; 5	SAN; R25; 6	SAN; R26; 4	SYD; R27; 1	SYD; R28; 2											2nd	3133
2012	Craig Lowndes	888	Holden	**ADE**; **R1**; **4**	ADE; R2; 5	SYM; R3; 5	**SYM**; **R4**; **Ret**	HAM; R5; 4	HAM; R6; 4	BAR; R7; 3	BAR; R8; 6	BAR; R9; 6	PHI; R10; 15	**PHI**; **R11**; **2**	HID; R12; 4	HID; R13; 1	TOW; R14; 5	TOW; R15; 2	**QLD**; **R16**; **1**	QLD; R17; 1	SMP; R18; 1	**SMP**; **R19**; **2**	SAN; QR; 7	SAN; R20; 1	BAT; R21; 3	SUR; R22; 6	SUR; R23; 6	YMC; R24; 8	YMC; R25; 11	YMC; R26; 11	WIN; R27; 2	WIN; R28; 1	SYD; R29; 1	SYD; R30; 2									2nd	3522
2013	Craig Lowndes	888	Holden	ADE; R1; 1	ADE; R2; 3	SYM; R3; 26	SYM; R4; 10	SYM; R5; 11	PUK; R6; 3	PUK; R7; 16	PUK; R8; 4	PUK; R9; 9	BAR; R10; 1	BAR; R11; 8	BAR; R12; 2	COA; R13; 2	COA; R14; 2	COA; R15; 2	COA; R16; 5	HID; R17; 26	HID; R18; 3	HID; R19; 1	TOW; R20; 4	TOW; R21; 7	QLD; R22; 4	QLD; R23; 12	QLD; R24; 6	WIN; R25; 21	WIN; R26; 12	WIN; R27; 10	SAN; QR; 3	SAN; R28; 2	BAT; R29; 3	**SUR**; **R30**; **1**	SUR; R31; 8	PHI; R32; 8	PHI; R33; 1	PHI; R34; 3	SYD; R35; 15	SYD; R36; 5			2nd	2966
2014	Craig Lowndes	888	Holden	ADE; R1; 2	**ADE**; **R2**; **1**	ADE; R3; 2	SYM; R4; 8	SYM; R5; 5	SYM; R6; 1	WIN; R7; 8	WIN; R8; 16	WIN; R9; 7	PUK; R10; 3	PUK; R11; 16	PUK; R12; 10	PUK; R13; 20	BAR; R14; 6	**BAR**; **R15**; **1**	**BAR**; **R16**; **2**	HID; R17; 2	HID; R18; 2	**HID**; **R19**; **17**	TOW; R20; Ret	TOW; R21; 6	TOW; R22; 23	**QLD**; **R23**; **2**	QLD; R24; 2	QLD; R25; 2	SMP; R26; 3	SMP; R27; 11	SMP; R28; 9	SAN; QR; 7	SAN; R29; 4	BAT; R30; 10	SUR; R31; 17	SUR; R32; 11	PHI; R33; 2	PHI; R34; 2	PHI; R35; 10	SYD; R36; 13	SYD; R37; 20	SYD; R38; 17	4th	2659
2015	Craig Lowndes	888	Holden	ADE; R1; 4	ADE; R2; 3	ADE; R3; 9	**SYM**; **R4**; **1**	**SYM**; **R5**; **1**	**SYM**; **R6**; **6**	BAR; R7; 3	BAR; R8; 5	BAR; R9; 2	WIN; R10; 12	WIN; R11; 8	WIN; R12; 3	HID; R13; 18	HID; R14; 1	HID; R15; 15	TOW; R16; 14	TOW; R17; 9	QLD; R18; 3	**QLD**; **R19**; **2**	QLD; R20; 2	SMP; R21; 5	SMP; R22; 10	SMP; R23; 10	SAN; QR; 23	SAN; R24; 13	BAT; R25; 1	SUR; R26; 3	SUR; R27; 4	PUK; R28; 4	PUK; R29; Ret	PUK; R30; 2	PHI; R31; 1	PHI; R32; 3	PHI; R33; 1	SYD; R34; 15	SYD; R35; 7	SYD; R36; 6			2nd	3008
2016	Craig Lowndes	888	Holden	ADE; R1; 7	ADE; R2; 10	ADE; R3; 13	SYM; R4; 5	SYM; R5; 2	PHI; R6; 6	PHI; R7; 5	BAR; R8; 1	BAR; R9; 3	WIN; R10; 15	WIN; R11; 8	HID; R12; 11	HID; R13; 3	TOW; R14; 12	TOW; R15; 10	QLD; R16; 3	QLD; R17; 1	SMP; R18; 6	SMP; R19; 2	SAN; QR; 12	SAN; R20; 8	BAT; R21; 16	SUR; R22; 6	SUR; R23; 4	PUK; R24; 16	PUK; R25; 15	PUK; R26; 4	PUK; R27; 6	SYD; R28; 8	SYD; R29; 9										4th	2770
2017	Craig Lowndes	888	Holden	ADE; R1; 8	ADE; R2; 10	SYM; R3; 3	SYM; R4; 4	PHI; R5; 12	PHI; R6; 23	BAR; R7; 7	BAR; R8; 8	WIN; R9; 6	WIN; R10; 15	HID; R11; 7	HID; R12; 6	TOW; R13; 6	TOW; R14; 10	QLD; R15; 5	QLD; R16; 6	SMP; R17; 7	SMP; R18; 24	SAN; QR; DNF	SAN; R19; 11	BAT; R20; 11	SUR; R21; 7	SUR; R22; 4	PUK; R23; 8	PUK; R24; 4	NEW; R25; Ret	NEW; R26; Ret													10th	2160
2018	Craig Lowndes	888	Holden	ADE; R1; 9	ADE; R2; 7	MEL; R3; 16	MEL; R4; Ret	MEL; R5; 6	MEL; R6; 12	SYM; R7; 2	**SYM**; **R8**; **1**	PHI; R9; 4	PHI; R10; 7	BAR; R11; 5	BAR; R12; 3	WIN; R13; 13	WIN; R14; 12	HID; R15; 7	HID; R16; 10	TOW; R17; 4	TOW; R18; 4	QLD; R19; 3	QLD; R20; 8	SMP; R21; 4	BEN; R22; 10	BEN; R23; 8	SAN; QR; 10	SAN; R24; 3	BAT; R25; 1	SUR; R26; 2	SUR; R27; C	PUK; R28; 11	PUK; R29; 4	NEW; R30; 23	NEW; R31; 11								4th	3225

=== Complete Bathurst 1000 results ===
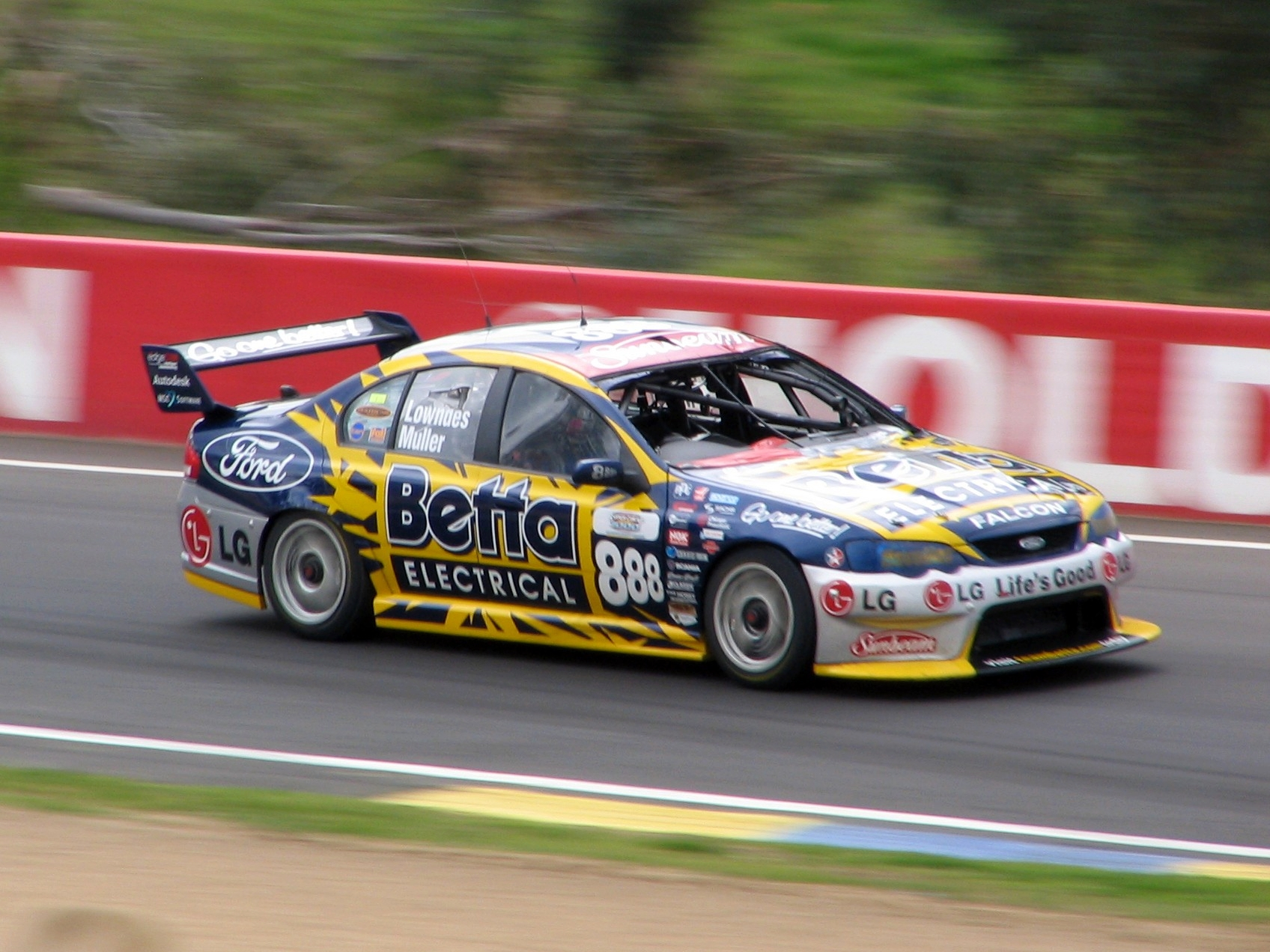
The Ford BA Falcon of Craig Lowndes and Yvan Muller at the 2005 Bathurst 1000.

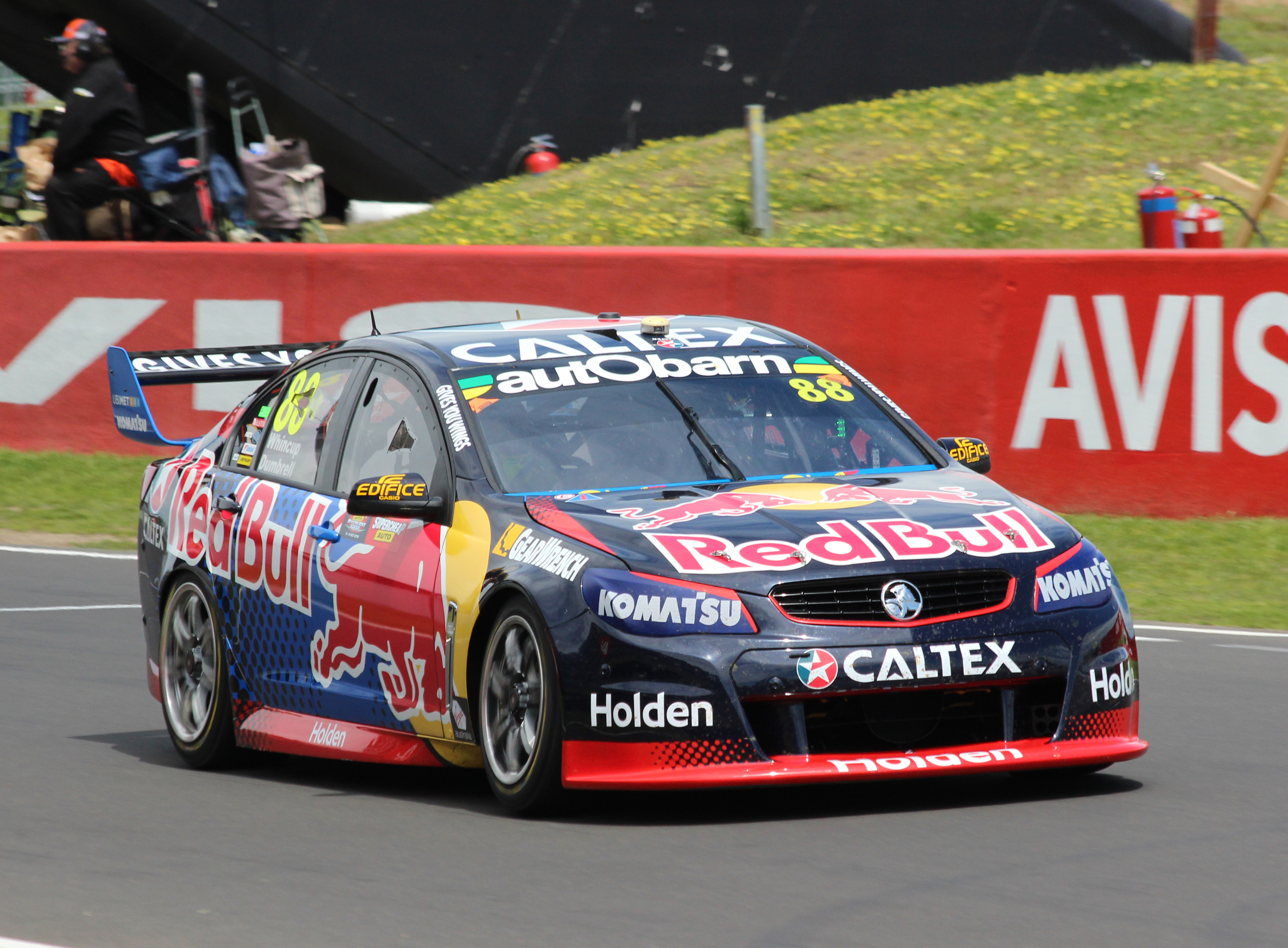
The Holden Commodore of Jamie Whincup and Paul Dumbrell at the 2016 Bathurst 1000.

Year	No.	Car	Drivers	Pos.	Laps
2003	65	Ford Falcon (BA)	(New Zealand) Paul Radisich (Sweden) Rickard Rydell	7th	161
2003	66	Ford Falcon (BA)	(Australia) Dean Canto (Australia) Matthew White	Ret	147
2004	88	Ford Falcon (BA)	(New Zealand) Paul Radisich (Brazil) Max Wilson	Ret	116
2004	888	Ford Falcon (BA)	(Australia) Dean Canto (France) Yvan Muller	Ret	138
2005	88	Ford Falcon (BA)	(Australia) Steve Ellery (Australia) Adam Macrow	**3rd**	**161**
2005	888	Ford Falcon (BA)	(Australia) Craig Lowndes (France) Yvan Muller	15th	151
2006	88	Ford Falcon (BA)	(United Kingdom) Richard Lyons (Denmark) Allan Simonsen	12th	161
2006	888	Ford Falcon (BA)	(Australia) Craig Lowndes (Australia) Jamie Whincup	**1st**	**161**
2007	88	Ford Falcon (BF)	(United Kingdom) Richard Lyons (Denmark) Allan Simonsen	5th	161
2007	888	Ford Falcon (BF)	(Australia) Craig Lowndes (Australia) Jamie Whincup	**1st**	**161**
2008	88	Ford Falcon (BF)	(Italy) Fabrizio Giovanardi (United Kingdom) Marc Hynes	15th	159
2008	888	Ford Falcon (BF)	(Australia) Craig Lowndes (Australia) Jamie Whincup	**1st**	**161**
2009	88	Ford Falcon (FG)	(Denmark) Allan Simonsen (United Kingdom) James Thompson	Ret	152
2009	888	Ford Falcon (FG)	(Australia) Craig Lowndes (Australia) Jamie Whincup	5th	161
2010	1	Holden Commodore VE	(Australia) Jamie Whincup (Australia) Steve Owen	**2nd**	**161**
2010	888	Holden Commodore VE	(Australia) Craig Lowndes (Australia) Mark Skaife	**1st**	**161**
2011	88	Holden Commodore VE	(Australia) Jamie Whincup (Australia) Andrew Thompson	21st	160
2011	888	Holden Commodore VE	(Australia) Craig Lowndes (Australia) Mark Skaife	**2nd**	**161**
2012	1	Holden Commodore VE	(Australia) Jamie Whincup (Australia) Paul Dumbrell	**1st**	**161**
2012	888	Holden Commodore VE	(Australia) Craig Lowndes (Australia) Warren Luff	**3rd**	**161**
2013	1	Holden Commodore VF	(Australia) Jamie Whincup (Australia) Paul Dumbrell	**2nd**	**161**
2013	10	Holden Commodore VF	(United Kingdom) Andy Priaulx (Sweden) Mattias Ekström	10th	161
2013	888	Holden Commodore VF	(Australia) Craig Lowndes (Australia) Warren Luff	**3rd**	**161**
2014	1	Holden Commodore VF	(Australia) Jamie Whincup (Australia) Paul Dumbrell	5th	161
2014	888	Holden Commodore VF	(Australia) Craig Lowndes (New Zealand) Steven Richards	10th	161
2015	1	Holden Commodore VF	(Australia) Jamie Whincup (Australia) Paul Dumbrell	18th	161
2015	888	Holden Commodore VF	(Australia) Craig Lowndes (New Zealand) Steven Richards	**1st**	**161**
2016	88	Holden Commodore VF	(Australia) Jamie Whincup (Australia) Paul Dumbrell	11th	161
2016	97	Holden Commodore VF	(New Zealand) Shane van Gisbergen (France) Alexandre Prémat	**2nd**	**161**
2016	888	Holden Commodore VF	(Australia) Craig Lowndes (New Zealand) Steven Richards	16th	156
2017	88	Holden Commodore VF	(Australia) Jamie Whincup (Australia) Paul Dumbrell	20th	124
2017	97	Holden Commodore VF	(New Zealand) Shane van Gisbergen (Australia) Matt Campbell	5th	161
2017	888	Holden Commodore VF	(Australia) Craig Lowndes (New Zealand) Steven Richards	11th	160
2018	1	Holden Commodore ZB	(Australia) Jamie Whincup (Australia) Paul Dumbrell	10th	161
2018	97	Holden Commodore ZB	(New Zealand) Shane van Gisbergen (New Zealand) Earl Bamber	5th	161
2018	888	Holden Commodore ZB	(Australia) Craig Lowndes (New Zealand) Steven Richards	**1st**	**161**
2019	97	Holden Commodore ZB	(New Zealand) Shane van Gisbergen (Australia) Garth Tander	**2nd**	**161**
2019	888	Holden Commodore ZB	(Australia) Jamie Whincup (Australia) Craig Lowndes	4th	161
2020	97	Holden Commodore ZB	(New Zealand) Shane van Gisbergen (Australia) Garth Tander	**1st**	**161**
2020	888	Holden Commodore ZB	(Australia) Jamie Whincup (Australia) Craig Lowndes	Ret	32
2021	39	Holden Commodore ZB	(Australia) Broc Feeney (Australia) Russell Ingall	Ret	142
2021	88	Holden Commodore ZB	(Australia) Jamie Whincup (Australia) Craig Lowndes	4th	161
2021	888	Holden Commodore ZB	(New Zealand) Shane van Gisbergen (Australia) Garth Tander	18th	161
2022	88	Holden Commodore ZB	(Australia) Broc Feeney (Australia) Jamie Whincup	5th	161
2022	97	Holden Commodore ZB	(New Zealand) Shane van Gisbergen (Australia) Garth Tander	**1st**	**161**
2022	888	Holden Commodore ZB	(Australia) Craig Lowndes (Australia) Declan Fraser	8th	161
2023	88	Chevrolet Camaro ZL1-1LE	(Australia) Broc Feeney (Australia) Jamie Whincup	23rd	142
2023	97	Chevrolet Camaro ZL1-1LE	(New Zealand) Shane van Gisbergen (New Zealand) Richie Stanaway	**1st**	**161**
2023	888	Chevrolet Camaro ZL1-1LE	(Australia) Craig Lowndes (Australia) Zane Goddard	24th	141
2024	87	Chevrolet Camaro ZL1-1LE	(Australia) Will Brown (Australia) Scott Pye	**3rd**	**161**
2024	88	Chevrolet Camaro ZL1-1LE	(Australia) Broc Feeney (Australia) Jamie Whincup	**2nd**	**161**
2024	888	Chevrolet Camaro ZL1-1LE	(Australia) Craig Lowndes (Australia) Cooper Murray	14th	161
2025	1	Chevrolet Camaro ZL1-1LE	(Australia) Will Brown (Australia) Scott Pye	17th	159
2025	88	Chevrolet Camaro ZL1-1LE	(Australia) Broc Feeney (Australia) Jamie Whincup	6th	161
2025	888	Chevrolet Camaro ZL1-1LE	(Australia) Craig Lowndes (Australia) Zach Bates	10th	161
2026	11	Ford Mustang GT	(Australia) Jackson Walls (Australia) Jack Perkins		
2026	88	Ford Mustang GT	(Australia) Broc Feeney (Australia) Nick Percat		
2026	888	Ford Mustang GT	(Australia) Will Brown (Australia) Scott Pye		
