= Sabre Motorsport =

New Zealand company that designs and constructs Formula First cars

Sabre Motorsport is a New Zealand company owned by Dennis Martin that designs and constructs Formula First cars, runs a Motorsport New Zealand Licensed Entrant and Racing School, hires racing cars, and manages a New Zealand Formula First Team.

== Dennis Martin ==
Dennis Martin has been involved with single-seater racing since the 1980s and Sabre Motorsport since 1999. Martin raced both Formula Vee's and Formula Ford's. His Formula Ford was a New Zealand made Valour Type 723.

His Crew are responsible for putting a number of New Zealand drivers into international careers, including Richie Stanaway, Nick Cassidy, Brendon Hartley, Shane van Gisbergen, and Liam Lawson.

In December 2019 Martin was fined $1500 for assaulting a driver at Pukekohe. His driver Matthew McCutcheon had his licence endorsed for the incident by as Martin was considered part of his team.

== Sabre Formula First ==
Sabre Motorsport manufacture a single seat Formula First race car. They sell the cars in kit set, rolling chassis, and ready to race forms.

== SpeedSport Scholarship ==
In the year 2000 Sabre Motorsport joined forces with Speedsport Magazine to create the Speedsport Star of Tomorrow Scholarship. With the demise of SpeedSport Magazine in 2010 the Scholarship Trust have been seeking funds to keep the Scholarship alive via a crowd funding campaign. The winners of the Speedsport Scholarship have been:

- 2001 Nic Jordan
- 2002 Josh Hart
- 2003 Mark Russ
- 2004 Shane van Gisbergen
- 2005 Andrew Waite
- 2006 Alastair Wootten
- 2007 Richie Stanaway
- 2008 Nick Cassidy
- 2009 Aaron Hodgson
- 2010 Hayden Pedersen
- 2011 Malcolm Finch
- 2012 Aaron Marr
- 2013 James Webb
- 2014 Brooke Reeve
- 2015 Liam Lawson
- 2016 Dylan Smith
- 2017 Conrad Clark
- 2018 Ronan Murphy
- 2019 Matthew McCutcheon
- 2020 Dylan Grant
- 2021 Jensen Bate
