= 2017 Sydney SuperSprint =

2017 V8 Supercar championship race

(New South Wales) 2017 Red Rooster Sydney SuperSprint
Event Information
- Round 9 of 14 in the 2017 International V8 Supercars Championship
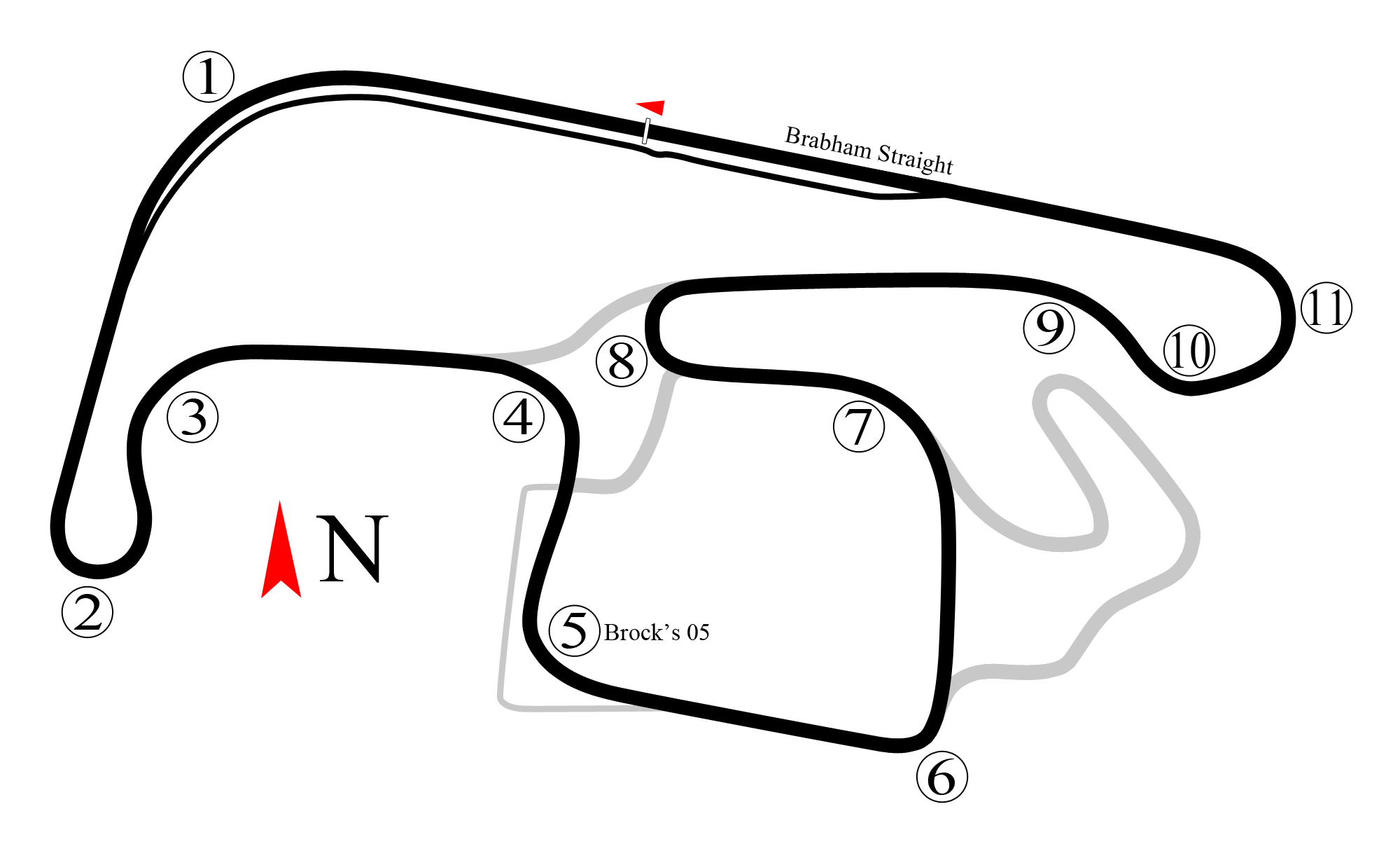
- Date: 18–20 August 2017
- Location: Eastern Creek, New South Wales
- Venue: Sydney Motorsport Park

Results
Race 1
Distance	31 laps	120 km
Pole position	(New Zealand) Scott McLaughlin; DJR Team Penske	1:28.3208
Winner	(New Zealand) Fabian Coulthard; DJR Team Penske	49:29.1700
Race 2
Distance	52 laps	200 km
Pole position	(New Zealand) Scott McLaughlin; DJR Team Penske	1:28.2259
Winner	(Australia) Jamie Whincup; Triple Eight Race Engineering	1:24:01.8616

The 2017 Red Rooster Sydney SuperSprint was a motor racing event for the Supercars Championship, held on the weekend of 18 to 20 August 2017. The event was held at Sydney Motorsport Park in Eastern Creek, New South Wales and consisted of two races, 120 and 200 kilometres in length. It is the ninth event of fourteen in the 2017 Supercars Championship and hosted Races 17 and 18 of the season.
