= 2017 Darwin Triple Crown =

Motor racing event

(Northern Territory) 2017 CrownBet Darwin Triple Crown
Event Information
- Round 6 of 14 in the 2017 International V8 Supercars Championship
- Date: 16–18 June 2017
- Location: Darwin, Northern Territory
- Venue: Hidden Valley Raceway

Results
Race 1
Distance	42 laps	120 km
Pole position	(Australia) Rick Kelly; Nissan Motorsport	1:05.7114
Winner	(New Zealand) Fabian Coulthard; DJR Team Penske	52:28.2817
Race 2
Distance	70 laps	200 km
Pole position	(New Zealand) Scott McLaughlin; DJR Team Penske	1:05.7232
Winner	(New Zealand) Scott McLaughlin; DJR Team Penske	1:21:04.2732

The 2017 CrownBet Darwin Triple Crown was a motor racing event for the Supercars Championship, held on the weekend of 16 to 18 June 2017. The event was held at Hidden Valley Raceway near Darwin in the Northern Territory and consisted of two races, 120 and 200 kilometres in length. It is the sixth event of fourteen in the 2017 Supercars Championship and hosted Races 11 and 12 of the season.

== Background ==
=== Driver changes ===
Taz Douglas was replaced at Lucas Dumbrell Motorsport with Cameron McConville.

This was the third round in which Super2 Series wildcards were allowed to compete in the main class. Jack Le Brocq and Macauley Jones were the two drivers to step up for this round.
