= Brad Vaughan =

Australian racing driver

- Nationality: Australian
- Born: Bradley Vaughan; 16 June 2004 (age 22) Elizabeth, South Australia

Super2 Series career
- Years active: 2023–2025
- Teams: Brad Jones Racing
- Former teams: Tickford Racing
- Starts: 38
- Wins: 3
- Poles: 6
- Fastest laps: 1
- Best finish: 5th in 2025

Previous series
- 2020–2021 2022: GR Cup; Super3 Series

Championship titles
- 2022: Super3 Series

Bradley Vaughan (born 16 June 2004) is a racing driver from Australia who currently competes in the Super2 Series for Brad Jones Racing.

== Career results ==
=== Summary ===
Season	Series	Position	Car	Team
2020	Toyota Gazoo Racing Australia 86 Series	–	Toyota 86 Mk.1	Angaston Motors
2021	Toyota Gazoo Racing Australia 86 Series	–	Toyota 86 Mk.1	N/A
2022	Super3 Series	1st	Ford Falcon FG	Anderson Motorsport
2023	Super2 Series	12th	Ford Mustang S550	Tickford Racing
2024	Super2 Series	8th	Ford Mustang S550	Tickford Racing
2024	Supercars Championship	51st	Chevrolet Camaro Mk.6	Matt Chahda Motorsport
2025	Super2 Series	5th	Holden Commodore ZB	Brad Jones Racing

=== Super3 Series results ===
(key) (Race results only)

Super3 Series results
Year	Team	No.	Car	1	2	3	4	5	6	7	8	9	10	11	12	Position	Points
2022	Anderson Motorsport	5	Ford FG Falcon	SMP; R1; 1	SMP; R2; 2	WAN; R3; 8	WAN; R4; 2	TOW; R5; 1	TOW; R6; 7	SAN; R7; 2	SAN; R8; 1	BAT; R9; 2	BAT; R10; C	ADE; R11; 1	ADE; R12; 1	1st	1488

=== Super2 Series results ===
(key) (Race results only)

Super2 Series results
Year	Team	No.	Car	1	2	3	4	5	6	7	8	9	10	11	12	Position	Points
2023	Tickford Racing	5	Ford Mustang S550	NEW; R1; 6	NEW; R2; Ret	WAN; R3; 2	WAN; R4; Ret	TOW; R5; 12	TOW; R6; 4	SAN; R7; 16	SAN; R8; 2	BAT; R9; 5	BAT; R10; 10	ADE; R11; DNS	ADE; R12; DNS	12th	813
2024	Tickford Racing	5	Ford Mustang S550	BAT1; R1; 6	BAT1; R2; 3	WAN; R3; NC	WAN; R4; 4	TOW; R5; Ret	TOW; R6; 16	SAN; R7; 11	SAN; R8; 1	BAT2; R9; 6	BAT2; R10; 2	ADE; R11; 14	ADE; R12; 7	8th	1015
2025	Brad Jones Racing	80	Holden Commodore ZB	SMP; R1; 22	SMP; R2; 2	TAS; R3; 5	TAS; R4; 8	TOW; R5; 20	TOW; R6; 9	QLD; R7; 2	QLD; R8; Ret	BAT; R9; 9	BAT; R10; 4	ADE; R11; 4	ADE; R12; 1	5th	1119
2026	Brad Jones Racing	80	Holden Commodore ZB	SMP; R1; 1	SMP; R2; 5	HID; R3; 8	HID; R4; 6	BAR; R5	BAR; R6	BAT; R9	BAT; R10	SAN; R7	SAN; R8	ADE; R11	ADE; R12	3rd*	453*

=== Supercars Championship results ===
Supercars results
Year	Team	No.	Car	1	2	3	4	5	6	7	8	9	10	11	12	13	14	15	16	17	18	19	20	21	22	23	24	25	26	27	28	29	30	31	32	33	34	Position	Points
2024	Matt Chahda Motorsport	118	Chevrolet Camaro ZL1	BAT1; R1	BAT1; R2	MEL; R3	MEL; R4	MEL; R5	MEL; R6	TAU; R7	TAU; R8	BAR; R9	BAR; R10	HID; R11	HID; R12	TOW; R13	TOW; R14	SMP; R15	SMP; R16	SYM; R17	SYM; R18	SAN; R19; 19	BAT2; R20; 25	SUR; R21	SUR; R22	ADE; R23	ADE; R24											52nd	156
2025	Brad Jones Racing	14	Chevrolet Camaro ZL1	SYD; R1	SYD; R2	SYD; R3	MEL; R4	MEL; R5	MEL; R6	MEL; R7	TAU; R8	TAU; R9	TAU; R10	SYM; R11	SYM; R12	SYM; R13	BAR; R14	BAR; R15	BAR; R16	HID; R17	HID; R18	HID; R19	TOW; R20	TOW; R21	TOW; R22	QLD; R23	QLD; R24	QLD; R25	BEN; R26; 20	BAT; R27; 21	SUR; R28	SUR; R29	SAN; R30	SAN; R31	ADE; R32	ADE; R33	ADE; R34	50th	119

=== Complete Bathurst 1000 results ===
Year	Team	Car	Co-driver	Position	Laps
2024	Matt Chahda Motorsport	Chevrolet Camaro Mk.6	(Australia) Matt Chahda	25th	146
2025	Brad Jones Racing	Chevrolet Camaro Mk.6	(Australia) Bryce Fullwood	21st	140
