= Mount Panorama 500 =

Motor race in Australia

(New South Wales) Bathurst 500
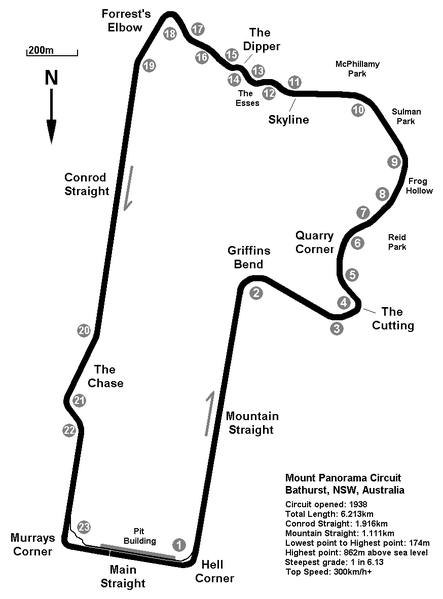
- Race Information
Venue	Mount Panorama Circuit
Number of times held	8
First held	1966
Last held	2024
- Race Format
- Race 1
Laps	40
Distance	250 km
- Race 2
Laps	40
Distance	250 km
- Last Event (2024)
- Overall Winner
(Australia) Will Brown	Triple Eight Race Engineering
- Race Winners
(Australia) Broc Feeney	Triple Eight Race Engineering
(Australia) Will Brown	Triple Eight Race Engineering

The Bathurst 500 was a Supercars Championship motor racing event that has been on occasion, with the most recent iteration for the 2024 season at Mount Panorama Circuit in Bathurst, New South Wales, Australia.

In recent years, the Bathurst sprint round has been used as a reserve round that can be implemented when necessary to replace cancelled rounds. This happened in 2021, when international travel restrictions forced Motorsport Australia to cancel the Bathurst 12 Hour, and in 2024, when Supercars' talks with Newcastle to renew their contract to run the Newcastle 500 collapsed. A championship sprint event at the circuit was previously held six times between 1966 and 1996.

== History ==
The Mount Panorama Circuit is best known as host of the Bathurst 1000 endurance race for touring cars, an event which was first run in Bathurst as the Armstrong 500 in 1963. In addition to the endurance race, generally held in October, the circuit had traditions of hosting a major event over the Easter weekend, dating back to the circuit's first major event, the 1938 Australian Grand Prix. The first four ATCC sprint rounds at the circuit were held as part of the annual Easter event, with the races held on Easter Monday.

The Australian Touring Car Championship, first run in 1960, was held as a single-race event until 1968, with Mount Panorama hosting the championship in 1966. At the event Ian Geoghegan won the second of his five championship titles, and he also went on to win two further sprint rounds at the circuit, including in 1969 when the championship expanded to a multi-round series. The Easter 1972 round, Geoghegan's third win at the event, has been considered as one of the greatest races in championship history due to the close battle between Geoghegan's Ford XY Falcon GTHO Phase III and Allan Moffat's Ford Boss 302 Mustang. The battle between the distinctive Ford models, in which the lead changed hands multiple times, culminated in Moffat needing to loosen his seatbelts to see out the side window with his windscreen covered in oil. From 1974 onwards, the Easter event only featured motorcycles and continued until 1988.

After a championship absence of over two decades, a sprint event returned to Mount Panorama in 1995 and 1996. The event was not on the Easter weekend, however it was still the second major annual event (the maximum permitted at the circuit under the New South Wales legislation of the period) following the demise of the Bathurst 12 Hour after 1994. Both of the 1990s rounds were won by John Bowe, winning the 1995 round without winning either of the two races and then winning all three races in 1996, both of which in the 1994 Bathurst 1000-winning chassis. In 1995, Bowe's team-mate Dick Johnson, who was the first to match Geoghegan as a five time series champion, won his final championship race before suffering a rear wing failure at approximately 280 kilometres per hour while talking to the Seven Network commentators on RaceCam in the second race.

The sprint round did not remain on the calendar in 1997, with two Bathurst 1000s being held instead after a promotional split, while from 1999 the unified Bathurst 1000 itself became a championship round. In 2020, the return of the sprint round was announced to be held in February 2021 as the final round of the extended 2020 season, in a shuffled calendar due to the COVID-19 pandemic. After further changes where the season was truncated to again finish within the 2020 calendar year, Supercars decided the event would be held as the first round of the next season in 2021, replacing the Bathurst 12 Hour, which could not be conducted because of international travel restrictions. The event featured two single-driver 250 kilometre races, both of which were won by Shane van Gisbergen.

With the cancellation of the Newcastle 500 round, the Bathurst 500 was announced as the replacement race to open the 2024 season, one week after the Bathurst 12 Hour. The events combined to form a ten-day Bathurst SuperFest, in order to comply with New South Wales' Motor Sports Events Act limit of five events a year. As in 2021, Triple Eight Race Engineering won both races; this time shared between Will Brown, on debut for the team, and Broc Feeney. However, the event had lower crowds compared to the Bathurst 12 Hour the week prior and was replaced by the Sydney SuperNight as the opening round for the 2025 calendar.

== Winners ==
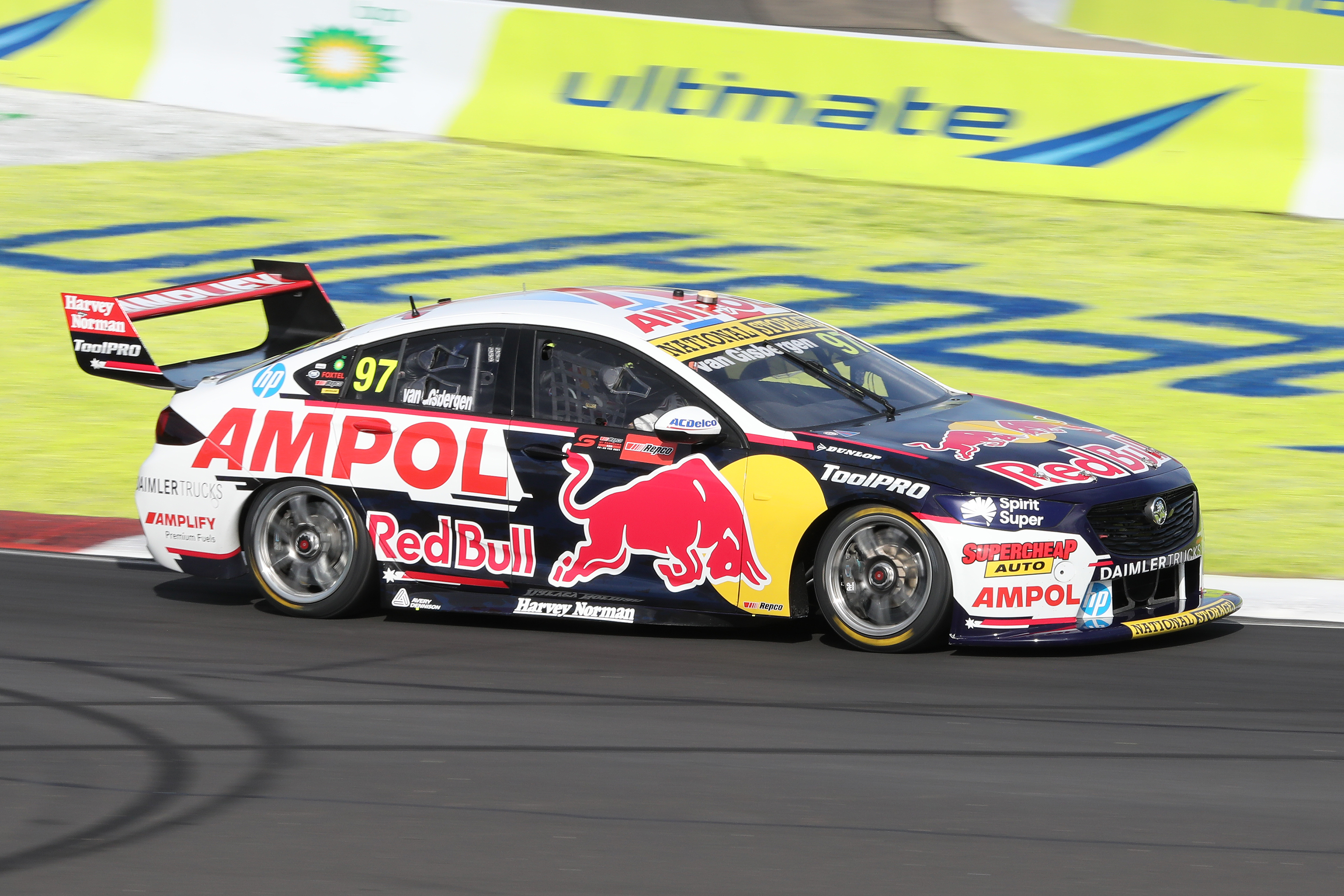
Shane van Gisbergen won the 2021 event.

Year	Driver	Team	Car	Report
1966	(Australia) Ian Geoghegan	Total Team	Ford Mustang Mk.1	Report
1967 – 1968	not held			
1969	(Australia) Ian Geoghegan	Mustang Team	Ford Mustang Mk.1	Report
1970	(Australia) Norm Beechey	Norm Beechey Shell Racing Team	Holden Monaro HT GTS350	Report
1971	not held			
1972	(Australia) Ian Geoghegan	Geoghegan's Sporty Cars	Ford Falcon XY GTHO Phase III	
1973 – 1994	not held			
1995	(Australia) John Bowe	Dick Johnson Racing	Ford Falcon EF	Report
1996	(Australia) John Bowe	Dick Johnson Racing	Ford Falcon EF	
1997 – 2020	not held			
2021	(New Zealand) Shane van Gisbergen	Triple Eight Race Engineering	Holden Commodore ZB	Report
2022 – 2023	not held			
2024	(Australia) Will Brown	Triple Eight Race Engineering	Chevrolet Camaro ZL1-1LE	Report

== Multiple winners ==
=== By driver ===
Wins	Driver	Years
3	(Australia) Ian Geoghegan	1966, 1969, 1972
2	(Australia) John Bowe	1995, 1996

=== By team ===
Wins	Team
3	Geoghegan's Sporty Cars (Note: Previously entered under the names Total Team and Mustang Team.)
2	Dick Johnson Racing
2	Triple Eight Race Engineering

=== By manufacturer ===
Wins	Manufacturer
5	Ford
2	Holden

== See also ==
- List of Australian Touring Car Championship races
