= 2024 Supercars Championship =

Motor racing competition

The 2024 Supercars Championship (known for commercial reasons as the 2024 Repco Supercars Championship) was a motor racing series for Supercars.

It was the twenty-sixth running of the Supercars Championship and the twenty-eighth series in which Supercars have contested the Australian Touring Car Championship, the premier title in Australian motorsport. It was the sixty-fifth season of touring car racing in Australia.

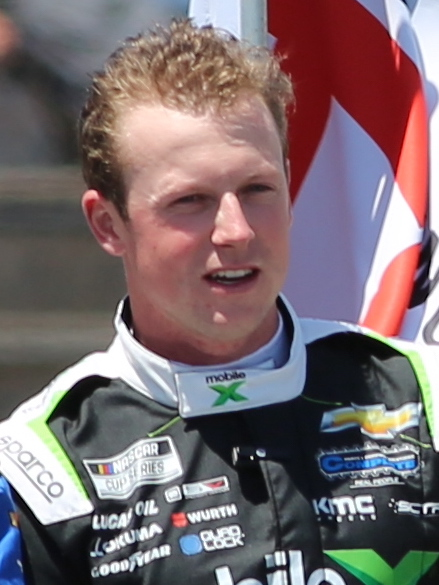
Will Brown won his first drivers' championship

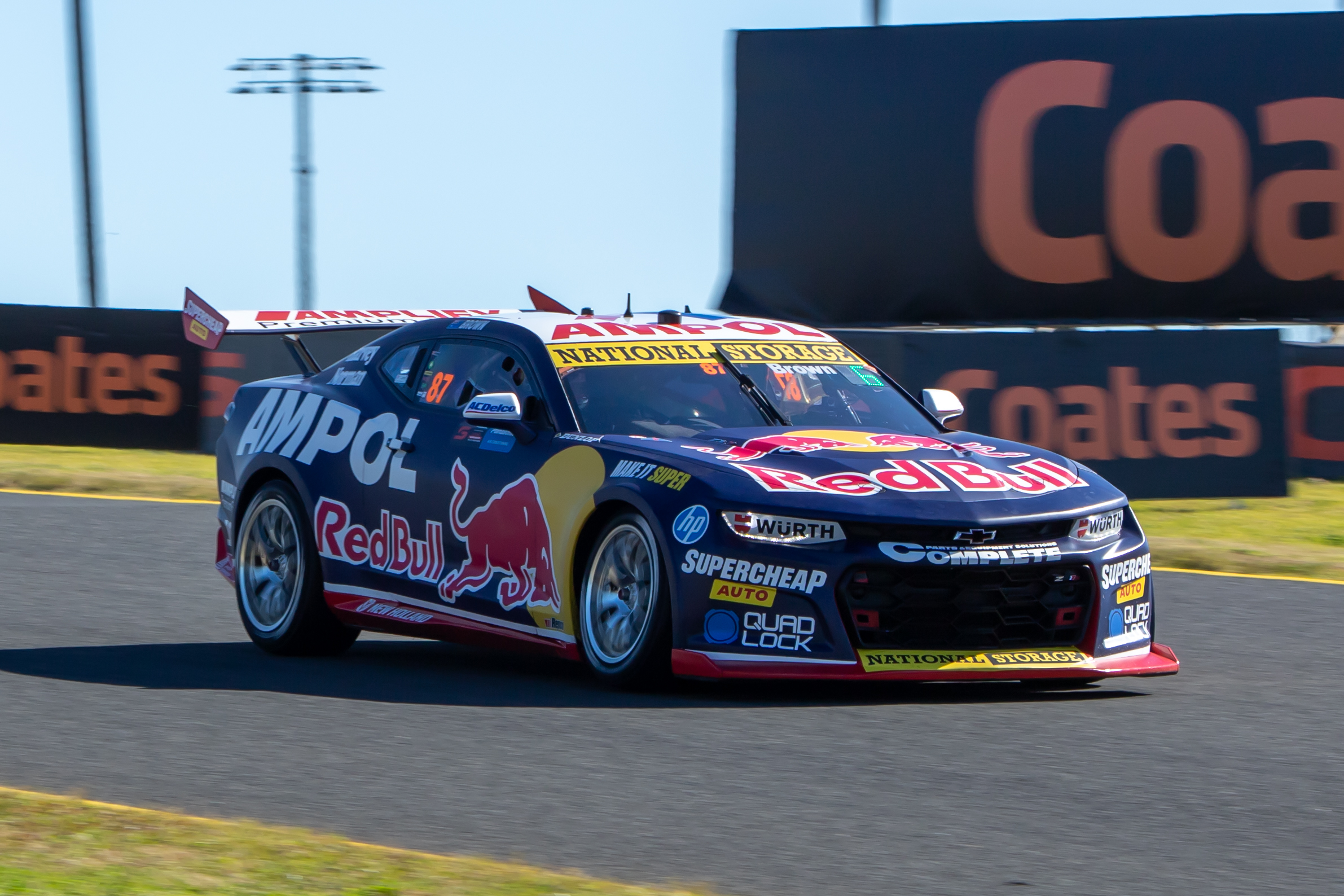
Triple Eight Race Engineering secured the Teams' Championship

Erebus Motorsport entered the championship as the defending Teams' Champions, while Brodie Kostecki entered the championship as the defending Drivers' Champion.

Triple Eight Race Engineering secured their record-extending twelfth Teams' Championship at the Bathurst 1000. Will Brown secured his first Drivers' Championship at the Adelaide 500.

== Teams and drivers ==
The following teams and drivers competed in the 2024 championship.

Championship entries						Endurance entries	
Manufacturer	Model	Team	No.	Driver name	Rounds	Co-driver name	Rounds
Chevrolet	Camaro Mk.6	Erebus Motorsport	1	(Australia) Brodie Kostecki	3–12	(Australia) Todd Hazelwood	9–10
Chevrolet	Camaro Mk.6	Erebus Motorsport	9	(Australia) Jack Le Brocq	All (Note: Le Brocq was entered into the Adelaide 500 round, and participated in practice 1, but later withdrew to attend the birth of his first child.)	(Australia) Jayden Ojeda	9–10
Chevrolet	Camaro Mk.6	Erebus Motorsport	9	(Australia) Cooper Murray	12	—N/a	
Chevrolet	Camaro Mk.6	Erebus Motorsport	99	(Australia) Todd Hazelwood	1–2	—N/a	
Chevrolet	Camaro Mk.6	Matt Stone Racing	4	(Australia) Cameron Hill	All	(Australia) Cameron Crick	9–10
Chevrolet	Camaro Mk.6	Matt Stone Racing	10	(Australia) Nick Percat	All	(Australia) Dylan O'Keeffe	9–10
Chevrolet	Camaro Mk.6	Brad Jones Racing	8	(New Zealand) Andre Heimgartner	All	(Australia) Declan Fraser	9–10
Chevrolet	Camaro Mk.6	Brad Jones Racing	12; 50 (Note: Car #12 was entered as car #50 from the Sandown 500 onwards to celebrate the 50th anniversary of sponsor SCT Logistics.)	(New Zealand) Jaxon Evans	All	(Australia) Dean Fiore	9–10
Chevrolet	Camaro Mk.6	Brad Jones Racing	14	(Australia) Bryce Fullwood	All	(Australia) Jaylyn Robotham	9–10
Chevrolet	Camaro Mk.6	Brad Jones Racing	96	(Australia) Macauley Jones	All	(Australia) Jordan Boys	9–10
Chevrolet	Camaro Mk.6	Team 18	18	(Australia) Mark Winterbottom	All	(Australia) Michael Caruso	9–10
Chevrolet	Camaro Mk.6	Team 18	20	(Australia) David Reynolds	All	(Australia) Warren Luff	9–10
Chevrolet	Camaro Mk.6	PremiAir Racing	23	(Australia) Tim Slade	All	(Australia) Cameron McLeod	9–10
Chevrolet	Camaro Mk.6	PremiAir Racing	31	(Australia) James Golding	All	(Australia) David Russell	9–10
Chevrolet	Camaro Mk.6	Triple Eight Race Engineering	87	(Australia) Will Brown	All	(Australia) Scott Pye	9–10
Chevrolet	Camaro Mk.6	Triple Eight Race Engineering	88	(Australia) Broc Feeney	All	(Australia) Jamie Whincup	9–10
Ford	Mustang S650	Walkinshaw Andretti United	2	(New Zealand) Ryan Wood	All	(New Zealand) Fabian Coulthard	9–10
Ford	Mustang S650	Walkinshaw Andretti United	25	(Australia) Chaz Mostert	All	(Australia) Lee Holdsworth	9–10
Ford	Mustang S650	Blanchard Racing Team	3	(Australia) Aaron Love	All	(Australia) Aaron Cameron	9–10
Ford	Mustang S650	Blanchard Racing Team	7	(Australia) James Courtney	All	(Australia) Jack Perkins	9–10
Ford	Mustang S650	Tickford Racing	6	(Australia) Cam Waters	All	(Australia) James Moffat	9–10
Ford	Mustang S650	Tickford Racing	55	(Australia) Thomas Randle	All	(Australia) Tyler Everingham	9–10
Ford	Mustang S650	Dick Johnson Racing	11	(Australia) Anton de Pasquale	All	(Australia) Tony D'Alberto	9–10
Ford	Mustang S650	Dick Johnson Racing	17	(Australia) Will Davison	All	(Australia) Kai Allen	9–10
Ford	Mustang S650	Grove Racing	19	(New Zealand) Matt Payne	All	(Australia) Garth Tander	9–10
Ford	Mustang S650	Grove Racing	26	(New Zealand) Richie Stanaway	All (Note: Richie Stanaway participated in the Adelaide 500 until after Practice 3, when he withdrew from the remainder of the weekend due to concussion)	(Australia) Dale Wood	9–10
Ford	Mustang S650	Grove Racing	26	(Australia) Dale Wood	12	—N/a	
Ford	Mustang S650	Grove Racing	26	(Australia) Kai Allen	12	—N/a	
Wildcard entries
Chevrolet	Camaro Mk.6	Matt Chahda Motorsport	118	(Australia) Matt Chahda	9–10	(Australia) Brad Vaughan	9–10
Chevrolet	Camaro Mk.6	Triple Eight Race Engineering	888	(Australia) Cooper Murray	5, 9–10	(Australia) Craig Lowndes	9–10
Ford	Mustang S650	Tickford Racing	5	(Australia) Lochie Dalton	7	—N/a	

=== Team changes ===
The amount of entrants was reduced from twenty-five to twenty-four with Tickford Racing downsizing from four cars to two cars after selling two of its Teams Racing Charters (TRC). One was purchased by Blanchard Racing Team, who expanded to a two car team, while the second was returned to Supercars.

=== Driver changes ===
Shane van Gisbergen left Supercars at the end of the 2023 season and moved to the United States to race full time in the NASCAR Xfinity Series and part-time in the NASCAR Cup Series for Kaulig Racing. His seat (which Triple Eight renumbered to 87) was taken by Will Brown, who left Erebus Motorsport. Jack Le Brocq left Matt Stone Racing to replace Brown at Erebus.

Due to Tickford Racing downsizing to two cars, James Courtney and Declan Fraser left the team. Courtney joined the expanded Blanchard Racing Team alongside Super2 Series graduate Aaron Love and Fraser joined Brad Jones Racing as an endurance co-driver. Todd Hazelwood, who drove for Blanchard Racing Team in 2023, was unable to secure a full time drive in 2024. Hazelwood would substitute for Brodie Kostecki at Erebus Motorsport for the first two rounds before later partnering Kostecki for the enduros.

Nick Percat left Walkinshaw Andretti United to replace Jack Le Brocq at Matt Stone Racing. His seat was filled by Super2 Series graduate Ryan Wood.

David Reynolds departed Grove Racing to join Team 18, replacing Scott Pye. Reynolds' seat at Grove was filled by Richie Stanaway, who last competed full-time in 2019. Pye would later be picked up by Triple Eight Race Engineering as an endurance co-driver.

Jack Smith retired from full-time driving and was replaced by Jaxon Evans at Brad Jones Racing.

=== Mid-season changes ===
Brodie Kostecki decided to sit out the Bathurst 500 and Melbourne SuperSprint rounds. Todd Hazelwood substituted for him at Erebus Motorsport. Kostecki would return to Erebus at the Taupō Super400.

Jack Le Brocq participated in the opening practice of the Adelaide 500 round, but departed afterwards to attend the birth of his first child. Cooper Murray replaced Le Brocq for the remainder of the weekend.

Richie Stanaway participated at the Adelaide 500 round, up to Practice 3, but sat out the remainder of the weekend after suffering a concussion after qualifying. Kai Allen was originally set to sub for Stanaway, but Allen's Super2 team, Eggleston Motorsport, blocked this in favor of Allen focusing on the Super2 title. As a result, Dale Wood ended up substituting for Stanaway for the Saturday race. Stanaway couldn't get medical clearance to race on the Sunday and was replaced by Allen after Grove Racing got the necessary sign off from every Super2 team to allow him to compete in both Super2 and the main championship in the same weekend.

=== Wildcard entries ===
Triple Eight Race Engineering continued their successful wildcard program, entering Cooper Murray in a third car at the Darwin Triple Crown, which was later used for him to partner Craig Lowndes for the Sandown 500 and Bathurst 1000.

Matt Chahda Motorsport would again enter the endurance rounds with Chahda and Brad Vaughan driving.

Tickford Racing entered a third car for Lochie Dalton at the Sydney SuperNight.

== Calendar ==
The following circuits hosted a round of the 2024 championship.

Round	Event	Circuit	Location	Dates	Map	
1	Bathurst 500	(New South Wales) Mount Panorama Circuit	Bathurst, New South Wales	24–25 February	2024 Supercars Championship is located in Australia	2024 Supercars Championship is located in New Zealand
2	Melbourne SuperSprint	(Victoria (state)) Albert Park Circuit	Albert Park, Victoria	21–24 March	2024 Supercars Championship is located in Australia	2024 Supercars Championship is located in New Zealand
3	Taupō Super400	(New Zealand) Taupō International Motorsport Park	Taupō, Waikato Region	20–21 April	2024 Supercars Championship is located in Australia	2024 Supercars Championship is located in New Zealand
4	Perth SuperSprint	(Western Australia) Wanneroo Raceway	Neerabup, Western Australia	18–19 May	2024 Supercars Championship is located in Australia	2024 Supercars Championship is located in New Zealand
5	Darwin Triple Crown	(Northern Territory) Hidden Valley Raceway	Darwin, Northern Territory	15–16 June	2024 Supercars Championship is located in Australia	2024 Supercars Championship is located in New Zealand
6	Townsville 500	(Queensland) Reid Park Street Circuit	Townsville, Queensland	6–7 July	2024 Supercars Championship is located in Australia	2024 Supercars Championship is located in New Zealand
7	Sydney SuperNight	(New South Wales) Sydney Motorsport Park	Eastern Creek, New South Wales	20–21 July	2024 Supercars Championship is located in Australia	2024 Supercars Championship is located in New Zealand
8	Tasmania SuperSprint	(Tasmania) Symmons Plains Raceway	Launceston, Tasmania	17–18 August	2024 Supercars Championship is located in Australia	2024 Supercars Championship is located in New Zealand
9	Sandown 500	(Victoria (state)) Sandown Raceway	Springvale, Victoria	15 September	2024 Supercars Championship is located in Australia	2024 Supercars Championship is located in New Zealand
10	Bathurst 1000	(New South Wales) Mount Panorama Circuit	Bathurst, New South Wales	13 October	2024 Supercars Championship is located in Australia	2024 Supercars Championship is located in New Zealand
11	Gold Coast 500	(Queensland) Surfers Paradise Street Circuit	Surfers Paradise, Queensland	26–27 October	2024 Supercars Championship is located in Australia	2024 Supercars Championship is located in New Zealand
12	Adelaide 500	(South Australia) Adelaide Street Circuit	Adelaide, South Australia	16–17 November	2024 Supercars Championship is located in Australia	2024 Supercars Championship is located in New Zealand

=== Calendar changes ===
Bathurst 500 returned to the calendar for the first time since 2021, replacing the cancelled Newcastle 500.

The Bend Motorsport Park was omitted from the 2024 calendar, but returned in 2025 as an endurance event.

Taupō International Motorsport Park hosted a Supercars event for the first time.

The Sandown 500 was originally set to be held on 22 September, but on 14 March, the event was moved forward a week to 15 September.

== Rule changes ==
=== Format changes ===
The Perth, Darwin and Tasmania rounds were scheduled to feature two timed races of 60 minutes, but reverted to distance-based races after the first round of the season. These races also featured a revised format, with 2 races comprising the weekend running, down from 3 in 2023. This change has been criticised by fans, especially due to the fact that practise and qualifying sessions for the weekend add up being longer than the two races, starving fans of racing action. The Taupō and Sydney events now fall under the Super400 format, which will feature two 200km races.

=== Technical changes ===
The way in which pit garages are allocated was changed for 2024. Previously the order remained consistent for the whole season, being based on the finishing order in the teams championship the previous year. In 2024 a live pit lane order was adopted with the order of the pit-lane changed from round to round, being determined by the standings in the current season.

== Results and standings ==
=== Season summary ===
Round	Race	Event	Pole position	Fastest lap	Winning driver	Winning team	Report
1	1	Bathurst 500	(Australia) Will Brown	(Australia) Chaz Mostert	(Australia) Broc Feeney	Triple Eight Race Engineering	Report
1	2	Bathurst 500	(Australia) Broc Feeney	(Australia) Broc Feeney	(Australia) Will Brown	Triple Eight Race Engineering	Report
2	3	Melbourne SuperSprint	(Australia) Broc Feeney	(Australia) Broc Feeney	(Australia) Broc Feeney	Triple Eight Race Engineering	Report
2	4	Melbourne SuperSprint	(Australia) Cam Waters	(Australia) Will Brown	(Australia) Will Brown	Triple Eight Race Engineering	Report
2	5	Melbourne SuperSprint	(New Zealand) Matt Payne	(Australia) Chaz Mostert	(Australia) Broc Feeney	Triple Eight Race Engineering	Report
2	6	Melbourne SuperSprint	(Australia) Chaz Mostert	(Australia) Thomas Randle	(Australia) Nick Percat	Matt Stone Racing	Report
3	7	Taupō Super400	(Australia) Cam Waters	(Australia) David Reynolds	(New Zealand) Andre Heimgartner	Brad Jones Racing	Report
3	8	Taupō Super400	(New Zealand) Matt Payne	(New Zealand) Ryan Wood	(Australia) Will Brown	Triple Eight Race Engineering	Report
4	9	Perth SuperSprint	(Australia) Chaz Mostert	(Australia) Will Brown	(Australia) Chaz Mostert	Walkinshaw Andretti United	Report
4	10	Perth SuperSprint	(Australia) Cam Waters	(Australia) Chaz Mostert	(Australia) Cam Waters	Tickford Racing	Report
5	11	Darwin Triple Crown	(Australia) James Golding	(Australia) Cooper Murray	(Australia) Broc Feeney	Triple Eight Race Engineering	Report
5	12	Darwin Triple Crown	(Australia) Broc Feeney	(Australia) Will Brown	(Australia) Broc Feeney	Triple Eight Race Engineering	Report
6	13	Townsville 500	(Australia) Cam Waters	(New Zealand) Matt Payne	(Australia) Cam Waters	Tickford Racing	Report
6	14	Townsville 500	(Australia) Jack Le Brocq	(Australia) James Courtney	(New Zealand) Matt Payne	Grove Racing	Report
7	15	Sydney SuperNight	(Australia) Cam Waters	(Australia) Jack Le Brocq	(Australia) Chaz Mostert	Walkinshaw Andretti United	Report
7	16	Sydney SuperNight	(Australia) Will Davison	(Australia) Chaz Mostert	(Australia) Chaz Mostert	Walkinshaw Andretti United	Report
8	17	Tasmania SuperSprint	(Australia) Broc Feeney	(New Zealand) Matt Payne	(Australia) Nick Percat	Matt Stone Racing	Report
8	18	Tasmania SuperSprint	(Australia) Thomas Randle	(Australia) Thomas Randle	(Australia) Cam Waters	Tickford Racing	Report
9	19	Sandown 500	(Australia) Will Brown	(Australia) Will Brown	(Australia) Will Brown (Australia) Scott Pye	Triple Eight Race Engineering	Report
10	20	Bathurst 1000	(Australia) Brodie Kostecki	(Australia) Broc Feeney	(Australia) Brodie Kostecki (Australia) Todd Hazelwood	Erebus Motorsport	Report
11	21	Gold Coast 500	(Australia) Cam Waters	(Australia) Broc Feeney	(Australia) Cam Waters	Tickford Racing	Report
11	22	Gold Coast 500	(Australia) Brodie Kostecki	(Australia) Nick Percat	(Australia) Brodie Kostecki	Erebus Motorsport	Report
12	23	Adelaide 500	(Australia) Cam Waters	(Australia) Will Brown	(Australia) Broc Feeney	Triple Eight Race Engineering	Report
12	24	Adelaide 500	(Australia) Broc Feeney	(Australia) Will Brown	(Australia) Will Brown	Triple Eight Race Engineering	Report

=== Points system ===
Points were awarded for each race at an event, to the driver or drivers of a car that completed at least 75% of the race distance and was running at the completion of the race. At least 50% of the planned race distance must be completed for the result to be valid and championship points awarded. No extra points were awarded if the fastest lap time is achieved by a driver who was classified outside the top fifteen.

Points format	Position																									
Points format	1st	2nd	3rd	4th	5th	6th	7th	8th	9th	10th	11th	12th	13th	14th	15th	16th	17th	18th	19th	20th	21st	22nd	23rd	24th	25th	FL
Endurance	300	276	258	240	222	204	192	180	168	156	144	138	132	126	120	114	108	102	96	90	84	78	72	66	60	
Two-race	150	138	129	120	111	102	96	90	84	78	72	69	66	63	60	57	54	51	48	45	42	39	36	33	30	
Melbourne	75	69	64	60	55	51	48	45	42	39	36	34	33	31	30	28	27	25	24	22	21	19	18	16	15	5

- Endurance: Used for the Sandown 500 and Bathurst 1000.
- Two-race: Used for the Bathurst 500, Taupō Super400, Perth SuperSprint (with 5 points awarded for the fastest lap), Darwin Triple Crown (with 5 points awarded for the fastest lap), Townsville 500, Sydney SuperNight, Tasmania SuperSprint (with 5 points awarded for the fastest lap), Gold Coast 500 and Adelaide 500.
- Melbourne: Used for the Melbourne SuperSprint.

=== Drivers' championship ===
Pos.	Driver	No.	BAT1 (New South Wales)		MEL (Victoria (state))				TAU (New Zealand)		BAR (Western Australia)		HID (Northern Territory)		TOW (Queensland)		SMP (New South Wales)		SYM (Tasmania)		SAN (Victoria (state))	BAT2 (New South Wales)	SUR (Queensland)		ADE (South Australia)		Pen.	Pts.
1	(Australia) Will Brown	87	**2**	1	2	1	2	2	9	1	2	3	3	2	3	24	6	3	7	2	**1**	3	7	2	2	1	0	3060
2	(Australia) Broc Feeney	88	1	**3**	**1**	4	1	3	21	2	5	7	1	**1**	7	7	9	11	**3**	15	2	2	3	3	1	**7**	0	2838
3	(Australia) Chaz Mostert	25	3	2	4	17	3	**5**	22	7	**1**	2	5	16	2	3	1	1	2	4	7	5	10	11	13	2	0	2667
4	(Australia) Cam Waters	6	22	16	5	**7**	Ret	7	**8**	9	3	**1**	10	15	**1**	2	**7**	2	4	1	6	4	**1**	4	**3**	10	0	2551
5	(Australia) Thomas Randle	55	14	4	22	23	22	4	12	15	10	5	24	14	5	5	3	10	12	**18**	13	11	2	5	5	3	0	2032
6	(New Zealand) Matt Payne	19	10	7	3	3	**Ret**	14	13	**4**	8	9	15	20	4	1	2	4	17	21	4	Ret	4	9	4	23	0	2019
7	(Australia) James Golding	31	18	5	23	16	12	11	7	5	14	16	**4**	4	16	10	14	9	14	13	3	6	16	13	15	8	0	1991
8	(Australia) Nick Percat	10	6	9	6	6	9	1	19	16	7	21	7	5	21	20	8	8	1	7	23	17	12	22	14	5	0	1830
9	(Australia) Will Davison	17	16	10	14	5	14	6	2	19	23	4	11	7	8	12	4	**6**	15	11	24	12	19	20	12	4	0	1812
10	(New Zealand) Andre Heimgartner	8	9	18	18	14	20	17	1	6	13	15	8	21	9	11	12	19	22	6	11	16	8	6	7	9	0	1794
11	(Australia) Anton De Pasquale	11	21	15	7	Ret	16	DNS	3	3	9	6	9	8	Ret	13	5	5	13	14	14	7	11	Ret	9	15	0	1747
12	(Australia) Cameron Hill	4	5	23	13	20	15	Ret	20	12	11	11	16	9	10	9	11	14	6	12	10	10	23	14	18	16	0	1615
13	(Australia) David Reynolds	20	8	6	16	11	4	9	16	24	17	10	6	12	15	22	17	17	9	22	8	24	6	10	23	11	0	1615
14	(Australia) Jack Le Brocq	9	13	8	10	8	5	Ret	5	8	20	23	13	6	6	**4**	Ret	15	23	5	20	8	24	8	WD	WD	0	1567
15	(Australia) Mark Winterbottom	18	12	14	11	2	13	13	11	17	16	20	2	19	13	8	24	13	18	9	16	18	13	12	17	20	0	1557
16	(New Zealand) Ryan Wood	2	Ret	Ret	19	12	10	21	4	11	4	8	20	24	17	6	13	16	11	8	15	15	22	21	10	19	0	1492
17	(Australia) Brodie Kostecki	1							14	13	22	Ret	DNS	3	19	18	10	7	5	23	Ret	**1**	5	**1**	6	6	0	1488
18	(Australia) Bryce Fullwood	14	7	12	17	15	21	20	Ret	18	15	17	17	18	11	15	19	18	10	3	9	22	20	18	11	12	0	1459
19	(New Zealand) Richie Stanaway	26	4	11	12	13	7	8	6	10	24	12	14	10	14	14	16	21	16	17	Ret	9	9	7	DNS	DNS	0	1447
20	(Australia) Tim Slade	23	17	17	15	10	8	10	Ret	21	12	22	12	13	23	17	15	12	8	10	12	19	18	17	20	14	0	1380
21	(Australia) James Courtney	7	15	19	8	22	11	16	17	22	6	14	23	23	12	16	21	23	21	19	18	21	15	23	8	13	0	1298
22	(Australia) Macauley Jones	96	19	20	20	21	19	19	18	20	19	19	18	17	18	19	20	22	19	16	21	13	14	16	16	17	0	1219
23	(New Zealand) Jaxon Evans	12	20	21	24	18	18	18	10	14	18	18	21	11	22	21	18	20	24	Ret	22	20	17	15	19	DNS	0	1075
24	(Australia) Aaron Love	3	Ret	22	21	19	17	12	15	23	21	13	19	22	20	23	23	25	20	20	17	23	21	19	21	21	0	1027
25	(Australia) Todd Hazelwood	1/99	11	13	9	9	6	15													Ret	1					0	603
26	(Australia) Scott Pye	87																			1	3					0	558
27	(Australia) Jamie Whincup	88																			2	2					0	552
28	(Australia) Cooper Murray	9/888											22	25							5	14			24	18	0	501
29	(Australia) David Russell	31																			3	6					0	462
30	(Australia) James Moffat	6																			6	4					0	444
31	(Australia) Lee Holdsworth	25																			7	5					0	414
32	(Australia) Craig Lowndes	888																			5	14					0	348
33	(Australia) Tony D'Alberto	11																			14	7					0	318
34	(Australia) Cameron Crick	4																			10	10					0	312
35	(Australia) Tyler Everingham	55																			13	11					0	276
36	(Australia) Jayden Ojeda	9																			20	8					0	270
37	(Australia) Declan Fraser	8																			11	16					0	258
38	(Australia) Jaylyn Robotham	14																			9	22					0	246
39	(Australia) Warren Luff	20																			8	24					0	246
40	(Australia) Kai Allen	17/26																			24	12			DNS	22	0	243
41	(New Zealand) Fabian Coulthard	2																			15	15					0	240
42	(Australia) Garth Tander	19																			4	Ret					0	240
43	(Australia) Cameron McLeod	23																			12	19					0	234
44	(Australia) Michael Caruso	18																			16	18					0	216
45	(Australia) Jordan Boys	96																			21	13					0	216
46	(Australia) Dale Wood	26																			Ret	9			22	DNS	0	207
47	(Australia) Jack Perkins	7																			18	21					0	186
48	(Australia) Dylan O'Keeffe	10																			23	17					0	180
49	(Australia) Aaron Cameron	3																			17	23					0	180
50	(Australia) Dean Fiore	50																			22	20					0	168
51	(Australia) Bradley Vaughan	118																			19	25					0	156
52	(Australia) Matt Chahda	118																			19	25					0	156
53	(Australia) Lachlan Dalton	5															22	24									0	72
Pos.	Driver	No.	BAT1 (New South Wales)		MEL (Victoria (state))				TAU (New Zealand)		BAR (Western Australia)		HID (Northern Territory)		TOW (Queensland)		SMP (New South Wales)		SYM (Tasmania)		SAN (Victoria (state))	BAT2 (New South Wales)	SUR (Queensland)		ADE (South Australia)		Pen.	Pts.

Key
Colour	Result
Gold	Winner
Silver	Second place
Bronze	Third place
Green	Other points position
Blue	Other classified position
Blue	Not classified, finished (NC)
Purple	Not classified, retired (Ret)
Red	Did not qualify (DNQ)
Red	Did not pre-qualify (DNPQ)
Black	Disqualified (DSQ)
White	Did not start (DNS)
White	Race cancelled (C)
Blank	Did not practice (DNP)
Blank	Excluded (EX)
Blank	Did not arrive (DNA)
Blank	Withdrawn (WD)
Blank	Did not enter (cell empty)
Text formatting	Meaning
**Bold**	Pole position
Italics	Fastest lap

=== Teams' championship ===
Pos.	Driver	No.	BAT1 (New South Wales)		MEL (Victoria (state))				TAU (New Zealand)		BAR (Western Australia)		HID (Northern Territory)		TOW (Queensland)		SMP (New South Wales)		SYM (Tasmania)		SAN (Victoria (state))	BAT2 (New South Wales)	SUR (Queensland)		ADE (South Australia)		Pen.	Pts.
1	Triple Eight Race Engineering	87	**2**	1	2	1	2	2	9	1	2	3	3	2	3	24	6	3	7	2	**1**	3	7	2	2	1	30	5868
1	Triple Eight Race Engineering	88	1	**3**	**1**	4	1	3	21	2	5	7	1	**1**	7	7	9	11	**3**	15	2	2	3	3	1	**7**	30	5868
2	Tickford Racing	6	22	16	5	**7**	Ret	7	**8**	9	3	**1**	10	15	**1**	2	**7**	2	4	1	6	4	**1**	4	**3**	10	60	4523
2	Tickford Racing	55	14	4	22	23	22	4	12	15	10	5	24	14	5	5	3	10	12	**18**	13	11	2	5	5	3	60	4523
3	Walkinshaw Andretti United	2	Ret	Ret	19	12	10	21	4	11	4	8	20	24	17	6	13	16	11	8	15	15	22	21	10	19	90	4069
3	Walkinshaw Andretti United	25	3	2	4	17	3	**5**	22	7	**1**	2	5	16	2	3	1	1	2	4	7	5	10	11	13	2	90	4069
4	Grove Racing	19	10	7	3	3	**Ret**	14	13	**4**	8	9	15	20	4	1	2	4	17	21	4	Ret	4	9	4	23	0	3544
4	Grove Racing	26	4	11	12	13	7	8	6	10	24	12	14	10	14	14	16	21	16	17	Ret	9	9	7	DNS	DNS	0	3544
5	Dick Johnson Racing	11	21	15	7	Ret	16	DNS	3	3	9	6	9	8	Ret	13	5	5	13	14	14	7	11	Ret	9	15	60	3499
5	Dick Johnson Racing	17	16	10	14	5	14	6	2	19	23	4	11	7	8	12	4	**6**	15	11	24	12	19	20	12	4	60	3499
6	Erebus Motorsport	1/99	11	13	9	9	6	15	14	13	22	Ret	DNS	3	19	18	9	7	5	23	Ret	**1**	5	**1**	6	6	0	3442
6	Erebus Motorsport	9	13	8	10	8	5	Ret	5	8	20	23	13	6	6	**4**	Ret	15	23	5	20	8	24	8	WD	WD	0	3442
7	Matt Stone Racing	4	5	23	13	20	15	Ret	20	12	11	11	16	9	10	9	11	14	6	12	10	10	23	14	18	16	30	3415
7	Matt Stone Racing	10	6	9	6	6	9	1	19	16	7	21	7	5	21	20	8	8	1	7	23	17	12	22	14	5	30	3415
8	PremiAir Racing	23/200	17	17	15	10	8	10	Ret	21	12	22	12	13	23	17	15	12	8	10	12	19	18	17	20	14	60	3311
8	PremiAir Racing	31	18	5	23	16	12	11	7	5	14	16	**4**	4	16	10	14	9	14	13	3	6	16	13	15	8	60	3311
9	Brad Jones Racing	8	9	18	18	14	20	17	1	6	13	15	8	21	9	11	12	19	22	6	11	16	8	6	7	9	0	3253
9	Brad Jones Racing	14	7	12	17	15	21	20	Ret	18	15	17	17	18	11	15	19	18	10	3	9	22	20	18	11	12	0	3253
10	Team 18	18/100	12	14	11	2	13	13	11	17	16	20	2	19	13	8	24	13	18	9	16	18	13	12	17	20	0	3172
10	Team 18	20	8	6	16	11	4	9	16	24	17	10	6	12	15	22	17	17	9	22	8	24	6	10	23	11	0	3172
11	Blanchard Racing Team	3	Ret	22	21	19	17	12	15	23	21	13	19	22	20	23	23	25	20	20	17	23	21	19	21	21	30	2295
11	Blanchard Racing Team	7	15	19	8	22	11	16	17	22	6	14	23	23	12	16	21	23	21	19	18	21	15	23	8	13	30	2295
12	Brad Jones Racing	12/50	20	21	24	18	18	18	10	14	18	18	21	11	22	21	18	20	24	Ret	22	20	17	15	19	DNS	0	2294
12	Brad Jones Racing	96	19	20	20	21	19	19	18	20	19	19	18	17	18	19	20	22	19	16	21	13	14	16	16	17	0	2294
13	Triple Eight Race Engineering (w)	888											22	25							5	14					0	417
14	Matt Chahda Motorsport (w)	118																			19	25					0	126
15	Tickford Racing (w)	5															22	24									0	72
Pos.	Driver	No.	BAT1 (New South Wales)		MEL (Victoria (state))				TAU (New Zealand)		BAR (Western Australia)		HID (Northern Territory)		TOW (Queensland)		SMP (New South Wales)		SYM (Tasmania)		SAN (Victoria (state))	BAT2 (New South Wales)	SUR (Queensland)		ADE (South Australia)		Pen.	Pts.

Key
Colour	Result
Gold	Winner
Silver	Second place
Bronze	Third place
Green	Other points position
Blue	Other classified position
Blue	Not classified, finished (NC)
Purple	Not classified, retired (Ret)
Red	Did not qualify (DNQ)
Red	Did not pre-qualify (DNPQ)
Black	Disqualified (DSQ)
White	Did not start (DNS)
White	Race cancelled (C)
Blank	Did not practice (DNP)
Blank	Excluded (EX)
Blank	Did not arrive (DNA)
Blank	Withdrawn (WD)
Blank	Did not enter (cell empty)
Text formatting	Meaning
**Bold**	Pole position
Italics	Fastest lap

- (w) denotes wildcard entry.
