= 2021 Supercars Championship =

Motor racing competition

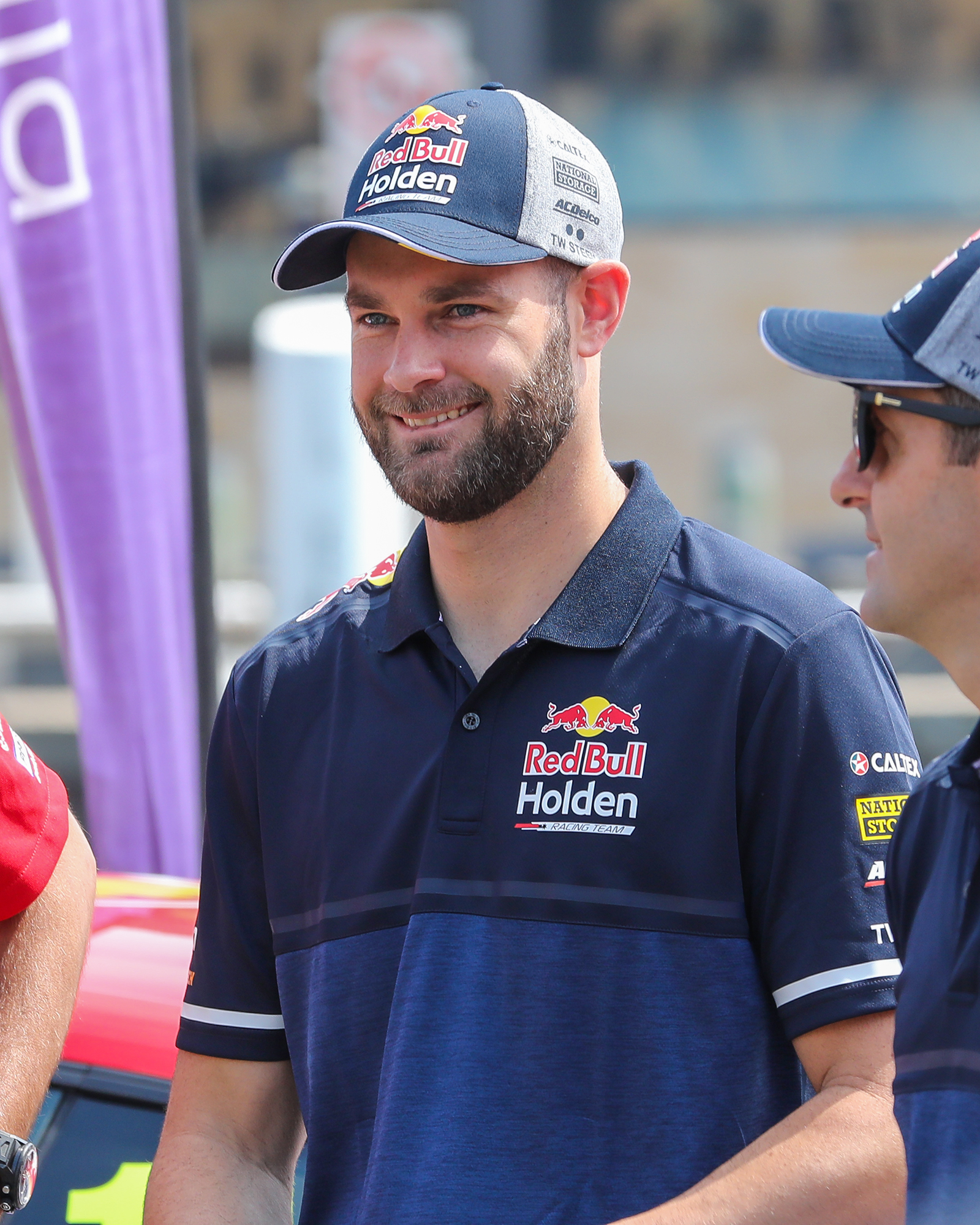
Shane van Gisbergen won the drivers' championship with one round to go.

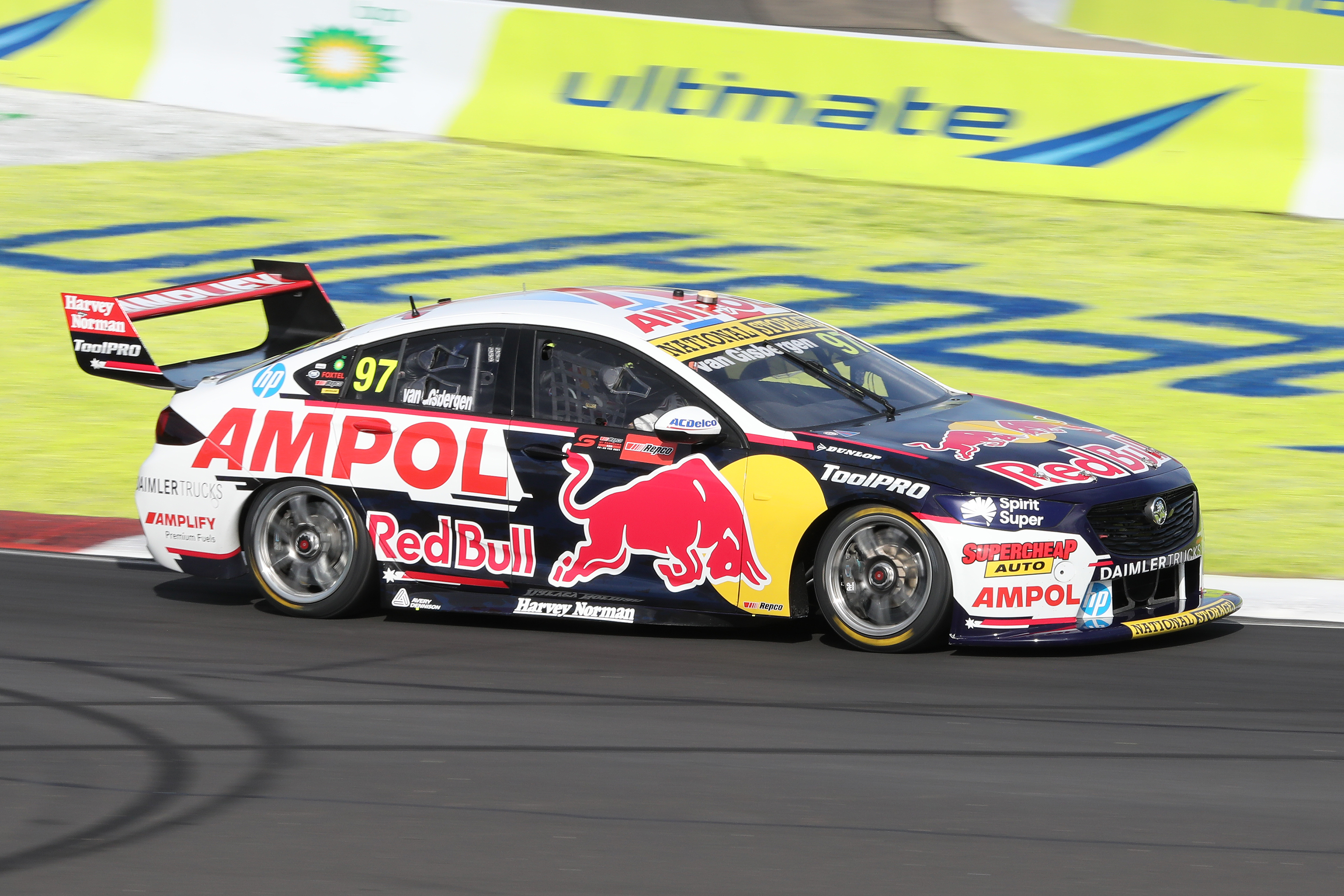
Triple Eight Race Engineering won the teams' championship with one round to go.

The 2021 Supercars Championship (commercially known as the 2021 Repco Supercars Championship) was a motor racing series for Supercars. It was the twenty-third running of the Supercars Championship and the twenty-fifth series in which Supercars have contested the Australian Touring Car Championship, the premier title in Australian motorsport. Atlanta-based international auto parts conglomerate Genuine Parts Company, through the consumer auto parts brand Repco, replaced Virgin Australia as naming rights sponsor under a five-year partnership, which was later expanded to eight years at the end of the 2022 prizegiving banquet.

Shane van Gisbergen and Triple Eight Race Engineering won the drivers' and teams' championship respectively with one round to go.

== Teams and drivers ==
The following teams and drivers competed in the 2021 championship.

Championship entries						Bathurst 1000 entries
Manufacturer	Model	Team	No.	Driver name	Rounds	Co-driver name
Ford	Mustang GT	Blanchard Racing Team	3	(Australia) Tim Slade	All	(Australia) Tim Blanchard
Ford	Mustang GT	Tickford Racing	5	(Australia) Jack Le Brocq	All	(Australia) Zak Best
Ford	Mustang GT	Tickford Racing	6	(Australia) Cam Waters	All	(Australia) James Moffat
Ford	Mustang GT	Tickford Racing	44	(Australia) James Courtney	All	(Australia) Thomas Randle
Ford	Mustang GT	Kelly Grove Racing	7	(New Zealand) Andre Heimgartner	All	(Australia) Matt Campbell
Ford	Mustang GT	Kelly Grove Racing	26	(Australia) David Reynolds	1–8, 11–12	(Australia) Luke Youlden
Ford	Mustang GT	Kelly Grove Racing	26	(Australia) Luke Youlden	9–10	—N/a
Ford	Mustang GT	Dick Johnson Racing	11	(Australia) Anton de Pasquale	All	(Australia) Tony D'Alberto
Ford	Mustang GT	Dick Johnson Racing	17	(Australia) Will Davison	All	(Australia) Alex Davison
Holden	Commodore ZB	Walkinshaw Andretti United	2	(Australia) Bryce Fullwood	All	(Australia) Warren Luff
Holden	Commodore ZB	Walkinshaw Andretti United	25	(Australia) Chaz Mostert	All	(Australia) Lee Holdsworth
Holden	Commodore ZB	Brad Jones Racing	4	(Australia) Jack Smith	All	(Australia) David Wall
Holden	Commodore ZB	Brad Jones Racing	8	(Australia) Nick Percat	All	(Australia) Dale Wood
Holden	Commodore ZB	Brad Jones Racing	14	(Australia) Todd Hazelwood	All	(Australia) Dean Fiore
Holden	Commodore ZB	Brad Jones Racing	96	(Australia) Macauley Jones	All	(New Zealand) Chris Pither
Holden	Commodore ZB	Erebus Motorsport	9	(Australia) Will Brown	All	(Australia) Jack Perkins
Holden	Commodore ZB	Erebus Motorsport	99	(Australia) Brodie Kostecki	All	(Australia) David Russell
Holden	Commodore ZB	Team 18	18	(Australia) Mark Winterbottom	All	(Australia) Michael Caruso
Holden	Commodore ZB	Team 18	20	(Australia) Scott Pye	All	(Australia) James Golding
Holden	Commodore ZB	Team Sydney	19	(New Zealand) Fabian Coulthard	All	(Australia) Jonathon Webb
Holden	Commodore ZB	Team Sydney	22	(Australia) Garry Jacobson	All	(Australia) Dylan O'Keeffe
Holden	Commodore ZB	Matt Stone Racing	34	(Australia) Jake Kostecki	All	(Australia) Kurt Kostecki
Holden	Commodore ZB	Matt Stone Racing	35	(Australia) Zane Goddard	All	(Australia) Jayden Ojeda
Holden	Commodore ZB	Triple Eight Race Engineering	88	(Australia) Jamie Whincup	All	(Australia) Craig Lowndes
Holden	Commodore ZB	Triple Eight Race Engineering	97	(New Zealand) Shane van Gisbergen	All	(Australia) Garth Tander
Wildcard entries
Ford	Mustang GT	Tickford Racing	55	(Australia) Thomas Randle	4–5, 9	—N/a
Holden	Commodore ZB	Walkinshaw Andretti United	27	(Australia) Kurt Kostecki	4–5, 9	—N/a
Holden	Commodore ZB	Triple Eight Race Engineering	39	—N/a	12	(Australia) Russell Ingall (Australia) Broc Feeney

=== Team changes ===
In February 2020, Holden's parent company General Motors announced it would retire the Holden name by the end of 2020. The Commodore ZB continues to be raced in 2021, albeit with no factory support.

Team Penske sold its majority shareholding in DJR Team Penske at the end of 2020, the team reverting its name to Dick Johnson Racing, which was last used in 2014.

The Grove Group purchased a majority stake in Kelly Racing. The team was renamed Kelly Grove Racing.

Blanchard Racing Team ceased to be a customer of Brad Jones Racing and took its Racing Entitlement Contract (REC) to form a standalone team with an ex-23Red Racing Ford Mustang. To allow it to continue fielding four cars, Brad Jones Racing purchased 23Red Racing's REC that was leased to Tickford Racing in 2020, which saw the latter downsize from four cars to three cars.

=== Driver changes ===
Dick Johnson Racing fielded an all new line-up for 2021. Scott McLaughlin did not defend his title, leaving the series to race in the IndyCar Series with Team Penske. This was the first time the champion has not returned to defend his championship since Craig Lowndes did not defend his 1996 title. It was originally planned that he would return to drive with the team as an endurance co-driver, however this did not eventuate due to ongoing COVID-19 travel restrictions. Fabian Coulthard moved to Team Sydney. Anton de Pasquale, who moved from Erebus Motorsport, and Will Davison drove for the team. For Davison, he returned to the team he last raced for full time from 2006 until 2008.

Erebus Motorsport fielded an all new line-up. David Reynolds and Anton de Pasquale left the team, and were replaced by Super2 drivers Will Brown and Brodie Kostecki. Reynolds returned to Kelly Grove Racing, having last raced for the team in 2011, to replace Rick Kelly, who retired from full-time racing at the end of 2020.

Tickford Racing scaled back to three cars, Lee Holdsworth departed the team and Jack Le Brocq moved to the number 5 car. Holdsworth joined Walkinshaw Andretti United as an endurance co-driver with Chaz Mostert.

Garry Jacobson left Matt Stone Racing to join Team Sydney. Zane Goddard and Jake Kostecki, who shared a car for the team in 2020, both raced for the team in all races.

As a result of Team Sydney signing Fabian Coulthard and Garry Jacobson, Chris Pither and Alex Davison did not return as full-time drivers. Pither joined Brad Jones Racing as an endurance co-driver with Macauley Jones and Davison joined Dick Johnson Racing as an endurance co-driver for brother Will Davison due to Scott McLaughlin's inability to return for Bathurst.

=== Mid-season changes ===
On 4 November, Kelly Grove Racing driver David Reynolds was ruled out of the remaining Sydney Motorsport Park rounds for failing to comply with New South Wales Health Orders regarding mandatory COVID-19 vaccination. He was replaced by Luke Youlden, who made his solo debut in the series. Reynolds was originally scheduled to return to the team for the Bathurst 1000, however on 18 November, it was announced that he would return for round 11 at Sydney Motorsport Park.

=== Wildcard entries ===
Two wildcards would be entered for The Bend, Darwin and round 9 at Sydney Motorsport Park. Thomas Randle would drive a fourth car for Tickford Racing, while Kurt Kostecki competed for Walkinshaw Andretti United.

Triple Eight Race Engineering entered a third car at the Bathurst 1000 for Russell Ingall and Broc Feeney.

== Calendar ==
Round	Event	Circuit	Location	Dates	Map
1	Mount Panorama 500	(New South Wales) Mount Panorama Circuit	Bathurst, New South Wales	27–28 February	2021 Supercars Championship is located in Australia
2	Sandown SuperSprint	(Victoria (state)) Sandown Raceway	Springvale, Victoria	20–21 March	2021 Supercars Championship is located in Australia
3	Tasmania SuperSprint	(Tasmania) Symmons Plains Raceway	Launceston, Tasmania	17–18 April	2021 Supercars Championship is located in Australia
4	The Bend SuperSprint	(South Australia) The Bend Motorsport Park	Tailem Bend, South Australia	8–9 May	2021 Supercars Championship is located in Australia
5	Darwin Triple Crown	(Northern Territory) Hidden Valley Raceway	Darwin, Northern Territory	19–20 June	2021 Supercars Championship is located in Australia
6	Townsville 500	(Queensland) Reid Park Street Circuit	Townsville, Queensland	10–11 July	2021 Supercars Championship is located in Australia
7	Townsville SuperSprint	(Queensland) Reid Park Street Circuit	Townsville, Queensland	17–18 July	2021 Supercars Championship is located in Australia
8	Sydney SuperNight	(New South Wales) Sydney Motorsport Park	Eastern Creek, New South Wales	30–31 October	2021 Supercars Championship is located in Australia
9	Sydney SuperNight	(New South Wales) Sydney Motorsport Park	Eastern Creek, New South Wales	6–7 November	2021 Supercars Championship is located in Australia
10	Sydney SuperSprint	(New South Wales) Sydney Motorsport Park	Eastern Creek, New South Wales	13–14 November	2021 Supercars Championship is located in Australia
11	Sydney SuperNight	(New South Wales) Sydney Motorsport Park	Eastern Creek, New South Wales	20–21 November	2021 Supercars Championship is located in Australia
12	Bathurst 1000	(New South Wales) Mount Panorama Circuit	Bathurst, New South Wales	5 December	2021 Supercars Championship is located in Australia

=== Calendar changes ===
The Adelaide 500 did not appear on the calendar for the first time since 1998, with the South Australian Tourism Commission withdrawing its financial support citing the after-effects of the COVID-19 pandemic and dwindling attendances as key factors.

Auckland, Gold Coast, Perth, Tasmania, Melbourne and Winton were due to return to the calendar after they were cancelled in 2020 due to the COVID-19 pandemic.

The season commenced with a sprint round, the Mount Panorama 500, at Mount Panorama after the Bathurst 12 Hour was cancelled due to the ongoing travel restrictions from the COVID-19 pandemic. The season was intended to end at the Gold Coast, changing from two 300 km endurance races to two single driver 250 km sprint races to become the Gold Coast 500. However, the Gold Coast round was subsequently cancelled.

Sandown was dropped from the original calendar, however was reinstated after the Melbourne 400 supporting the Australian Grand Prix was postponed and later cancelled. In doing so, Sandown hosted its first sprint round since 2011.

=== Impact of COVID-19 pandemic ===
A pre-season test day was planned for all teams at Sydney Motorsport Park. With COVID-19 border closures, this was amended with all Queensland based teams and Team Sydney using Queensland Raceway, while the Victorian teams and Brad Jones Racing used Winton.

The Albert Park round, which was scheduled to be a support category of the Australian Grand Prix, was moved to Sandown Raceway after the Grand Prix was postponed, then later cancelled in July 2021.

The Tasmania SuperSprint round was rescheduled from 10–11 April to 17–18 April due to a COVID-19 outbreak in Brisbane.

The Winton SuperSprint round was postponed due to a COVID-19 outbreak in Melbourne. Subsequently its place on the calendar was replaced by the Townsville SuperSprint, replicating the Townsville double header in 2020.

With challenges from COVID-19, the calendar was revised, with the series set to resume at the Winton SuperSprint, with the Sydney SuperNight being rescheduled to the 19–21 November due to a COVID-19 outbreak in Sydney, it was due to be held on 21–22 August. Phillip Island was due to return to the calendar for the first time since 2019. Subsequently the Perth and Auckland events were cancelled.

The calendar was revised once again, as the COVID-19 Delta outbreaks in New South Wales and Victoria caused the Phillip Island, Winton and Gold Coast events to be cancelled. The series resumed at Sydney Motorsport Park, with a quadruple-header utilising various formats and a mix of day and night racing, and ended at the Bathurst 1000.

== Rule changes ==
The championship awarded five bonus championship points to the driver who sets the fastest lap. These points will only be awarded in the sprint races.

A third tyre type, the Super Soft, was used at the Darwin and the fourth Sydney Motorsport Park events.

== Other changes ==
Repco, who were already the Supercars’ official automotive parts retailer, succeeded Virgin Australia as the title sponsor of the series until 2025.

A new five-year broadcast deal commenced in 2021. Fox Sports are continuing to show all rounds while the Seven Network took over from Network Ten as the free to air broadcaster, showing six rounds live, including the Bathurst 1000.

== Results and standings ==
=== Season summary ===
Round	Race	Event	Pole position	Fastest lap	Winning driver	Winning team	Report
1	1	Mount Panorama 500	(Australia) Cam Waters	(Australia) Chaz Mostert	(New Zealand) Shane van Gisbergen	Triple Eight Race Engineering	Report
1	2	Mount Panorama 500	(New Zealand) Shane van Gisbergen	(New Zealand) Shane van Gisbergen	(New Zealand) Shane van Gisbergen	Triple Eight Race Engineering	Report
2	3	Sandown SuperSprint	(Australia) Chaz Mostert	(Australia) Chaz Mostert	(New Zealand) Shane van Gisbergen	Triple Eight Race Engineering	Report
2	4	Sandown SuperSprint	(New Zealand) Shane van Gisbergen	(Australia) Jamie Whincup	(New Zealand) Shane van Gisbergen	Triple Eight Race Engineering	Report
2	5	Sandown SuperSprint	(New Zealand) Shane van Gisbergen	(New Zealand) Shane van Gisbergen	(New Zealand) Shane van Gisbergen	Triple Eight Race Engineering	Report
3	6	Tasmania SuperSprint	(New Zealand) Shane van Gisbergen	(Australia) Jamie Whincup	(New Zealand) Shane van Gisbergen	Triple Eight Race Engineering	Report
3	7	Tasmania SuperSprint	(Australia) Cam Waters	(Australia) Chaz Mostert	(Australia) Jamie Whincup	Triple Eight Race Engineering	Report
3	8	Tasmania SuperSprint	(Australia) Cam Waters	(Australia) Chaz Mostert	(Australia) Chaz Mostert	Walkinshaw Andretti United	Report
4	9	The Bend SuperSprint	(New Zealand) Andre Heimgartner	(New Zealand) Shane van Gisbergen	(New Zealand) Andre Heimgartner	Kelly Grove Racing	Report
4	10	The Bend SuperSprint	(Australia) Anton de Pasquale	(Australia) Chaz Mostert	(Australia) Anton de Pasquale	Dick Johnson Racing	Report
4	11	The Bend SuperSprint	(Australia) Anton de Pasquale	(Australia) Cam Waters	(Australia) Cam Waters	Tickford Racing	Report
5	12	Darwin Triple Crown	(Australia) Anton de Pasquale	(New Zealand) Shane van Gisbergen	(Australia) Chaz Mostert	Walkinshaw Andretti United	Report
5	13	Darwin Triple Crown	(Australia) Will Davison	(Australia) Chaz Mostert	(New Zealand) Shane van Gisbergen	Triple Eight Race Engineering	Report
5	14	Darwin Triple Crown	(Australia) Will Davison	(Australia) Will Brown	(New Zealand) Shane van Gisbergen	Triple Eight Race Engineering	Report
6	15	Townsville 500	(New Zealand) Shane van Gisbergen	(New Zealand) Shane van Gisbergen	(New Zealand) Shane van Gisbergen	Triple Eight Race Engineering	Report
6	16	Townsville 500	(Australia) Jamie Whincup	(Australia) Chaz Mostert	(New Zealand) Shane van Gisbergen	Triple Eight Race Engineering	Report
7	17	Townsville SuperSprint	(Australia) Anton de Pasquale	(Australia) Cam Waters	(Australia) Cam Waters	Tickford Racing	Report
7	18	Townsville SuperSprint	(Australia) Jamie Whincup	(New Zealand) Shane van Gisbergen	(New Zealand) Shane van Gisbergen	Triple Eight Race Engineering	Report
7	19	Townsville SuperSprint	(Australia) Cam Waters	(Australia) Cam Waters	(Australia) Cam Waters	Tickford Racing	Report
8	20	Sydney SuperNight	(Australia) Anton de Pasquale	(Australia) Will Brown	(Australia) Anton de Pasquale	Dick Johnson Racing	Report
8	21	Sydney SuperNight	(Australia) Anton de Pasquale	(Australia) Brodie Kostecki	(New Zealand) Shane van Gisbergen	Triple Eight Race Engineering	Report
8	22	Sydney SuperNight	(Australia) Anton de Pasquale	(Australia) Anton de Pasquale	(Australia) Anton de Pasquale	Dick Johnson Racing	Report
9	23	Sydney SuperNight	(Australia) Will Brown	(Australia) Scott Pye	(New Zealand) Shane van Gisbergen	Triple Eight Race Engineering	Report
9	24	Sydney SuperNight	(Australia) Anton De Pasquale	(Australia) Chaz Mostert	(Australia) Anton De Pasquale	Dick Johnson Racing	Report
9	25	Sydney SuperNight	(New Zealand) Shane van Gisbergen	(Australia) Jamie Whincup	(Australia) Jamie Whincup	Triple Eight Race Engineering	Report
10	26	Sydney SuperSprint	(Australia) Anton de Pasquale	(Australia) Anton de Pasquale	(Australia) Anton de Pasquale	Dick Johnson Racing	Report
10	27	Sydney SuperSprint	(Australia) Anton de Pasquale	(Australia) Anton de Pasquale	(Australia) Anton de Pasquale	Dick Johnson Racing	Report
10	28	Sydney SuperSprint	(Australia) Jamie Whincup	(Australia) Tim Slade	(Australia) Will Brown	Erebus Motorsport	Report
11	29	Sydney SuperNight	(Australia) Anton de Pasquale	(Australia) Jamie Whincup	(New Zealand) Shane van Gisbergen	Triple Eight Race Engineering	Report
11	30	Sydney SuperNight	(Australia) Nick Percat	race abandoned (Note: Race 30 was suspended due to torrential rain and could not be re-started. As less than 50% of the race distance had been completed when the race was abandoned, no points were awarded.)			Report
12	31	Bathurst 1000	(Australia) Chaz Mostert	(Australia) Chaz Mostert	(Australia) Chaz Mostert (Australia) Lee Holdsworth	Walkinshaw Andretti United	Report

=== Points system ===
Points were awarded for each race at an event, to the driver or drivers of a car that completed at least 75% of the race distance and was running at the completion of the race. At least 50% of the planned race distance must be completed for the result to be valid and championship points awarded.

Points format	Position																										
Points format	1st	2nd	3rd	4th	5th	6th	7th	8th	9th	10th	11th	12th	13th	14th	15th	16th	17th	18th	19th	20th	21st	22nd	23rd	24th	25th	26th	FL
Bathurst	300	276	258	240	222	204	192	180	168	156	144	138	132	126	120	114	108	102	96	90	84	78	72	66	60		
2*250 km	150	138	129	120	111	102	96	90	84	78	72	69	66	63	60	57	54	51	48	45	42	39	36	33			
SuperSprint	100	92	86	80	74	68	64	60	56	52	48	46	44	42	40	38	36	34	32	30	28	26	24	22	20	18	5

- Bathurst: Used for the Bathurst 1000.
- 2*250 km: Used for the Mount Panorama 500, Townsville 500 and Sydney SuperNight 3.
- SuperSprint: Used for all SuperSprint races, the Darwin Triple Crown and Sydney SuperNight 1 and 2.

=== Drivers' championship ===
Pos.	Driver	No.	BAT1 (New South Wales)		SAN (Victoria (state))			SYM (Tasmania)			BEN (South Australia)			HID (Northern Territory)			TOW1 (Queensland)		TOW2 (Queensland)			SMP1 (New South Wales)			SMP2 (New South Wales)			SMP3 (New South Wales)			SMP4 (New South Wales)		BAT2 (New South Wales)	Pen.	Pts.
1	(New Zealand) Shane van Gisbergen	97	1	**1**	1	**1**	**1**	**1**	2	6	7	3	2	13	1	1	**1**	1	6	1	2	2	1	4	1	2	**23**	2	3	3	1	C	18	0	2930
2	(Australia) Jamie Whincup	88	7	6	3	3	4	2	1	5	6	11	4	12	3	3	2	**2**	5	**2**	6	9	6	3	2	25	1	4	2	**2**	2	C	4	0	2719
3	(Australia) Chaz Mostert	25	2	3	**6**	4	24	4	6	1	2	Ret	5	1	4	4	14	9	3	3	9	6	7	7	14	8	3	11	4	8	5	C	**1**	0	2494
4	(Australia) Will Davison	17	3	7	22	10	5	5	3	3	8	2	3	14	**2**	**2**	9	4	11	4	3	7	2	5	3	4	7	7	5	12	9	C	10	0	2389
5	(Australia) Cam Waters	6	**20**	2	2	2	6	6	**4**	**4**	4	Ret	1	2	7	8	8	6	1	11	**1**	13	13	6	8	13	8	22	15	7	3	C	2	0	2369
6	(Australia) Anton de Pasquale	11	Ret	4	5	Ret	12	3	13	2	3	**1**	**Ret**	**Ret**	6	12	3	3	**2**	8	5	**1**	**DSQ**	**1**	12	**1**	2	**1**	**1**	9	**4**	C	Ret	0	2075
7	(Australia) Nick Percat	8	18	10	7	6	9	24	11	10	5	17	6	3	9	6	4	20	13	15	10	4	3	11	4	9	4	23	7	4	10	**C**	6	0	2008
8	(Australia) Will Brown	9	16	14	16	16	7	9	5	15	11	13	24	4	8	10	18	5	10	Ret	12	5	11	2	**11**	6	6	3	8	1	7	C	20	0	1838
9	(Australia) Brodie Kostecki	99	11	12	17	13	2	10	16	18	9	5	11	8	15	24	13	15	22	7	14	3	4	15	23	20	Ret	5	9	11	8	C	3	0	1788
10	(Australia) Mark Winterbottom	18	4	5	4	11	10	7	7	11	25	9	18	22	5	7	10	16	20	10	8	12	17	10	18	10	15	13	6	19	12	C	16	0	1725
11	(Australia) James Courtney	44	8	Ret	9	7	15	11	22	9	12	4	8	10	10	5	7	11	8	16	7	22	18	12	15	3	Ret	21	19	13	20	C	7	0	1647
12	(Australia) Tim Slade	3	Ret	DNS	13	9	17	17	12	12	14	15	7	7	19	9	6	8	4	12	22	10	5	9	7	12	5	9	20	20	13	C	9	0	1627
13	(Australia) Todd Hazelwood	14	10	18	14	14	8	14	14	16	15	19	13	Ret	14	21	22	7	9	5	4	14	10	23	5	26	9	12	13	5	14	C	8	0	1599
14	(Australia) Bryce Fullwood	2	5	13	24	15	13	23	17	17	16	6	14	11	12	14	11	13	21	14	11	18	12	18	10	16	22	Ret	10	14	23	C	5	0	1491
15	(Australia) Scott Pye	20	19	8	12	8	22	8	9	14	13	10	9	21	13	16	23	21	7	6	18	19	15	20	9	5	18	6	12	6	6	C	Ret	0	1489
16	(Australia) Jack Le Brocq	5	6	19	10	12	16	12	21	19	10	12	22	20	11	15	15	10	14	18	13	21	14	8	6	18	14	19	14	10	11	C	15	0	1486
17	(New Zealand) Andre Heimgartner	7	15	9	8	5	11	22	10	22	**1**	7	10	15	17	Ret	12	12	19	20	16	15	8	13	Ret	7	10	10	16	24	15	C	NC	0	1394
18	(Australia) David Reynolds	26	9	11	11	22	3	16	8	8	Ret	22	12	19	18	19	5	22	15	9	23	8	9	14							17	C	11	0	1270
19	(Australia) Jake Kostecki	34	13	17	23	18	14	13	15	21	21	18	16	5	24	25	19	DSQ	16	13	15	23	21	17	16	21	Ret	17	22	16	18	C	13	0	1157
20	(Australia) Zane Goddard	35	12	16	19	19	21	18	18	7	18	20	21	16	21	23	24	18	12	22	19	24	20	22	21	22	13	8	11	17	19	C	Ret	0	1088
21	(Australia) Jack Smith	4	17	21	18	21	23	15	Ret	23	23	21	19	Ret	22	22	17	17	17	19	21	20	19	19	19	24	17	18	21	21	16	C	17	0	1025
22	(Australia) Garry Jacobson	22	Ret	20	20	20	19	20	19	24	24	14	Ret	18	Ret	18	20	19	18	17	17	17	22	21	20	23	12	15	24	18	22	C	14	0	1003
23	(Australia) Macauley Jones	96	Ret	15	15	Ret	18	19	20	20	22	Ret	20	17	20	20	16	14	Ret	Ret	Ret	16	16	16	13	11	20	14	18	15	Ret	C	12	0	988
24	(New Zealand) Fabian Coulthard	19	14	22	21	17	20	21	Ret	13	20	Ret	17	Ret	16	13	21	Ret	Ret	21	20	11	23	Ret	17	14	19	16	17	22	21	C	19	0	936
25	(Australia) Thomas Randle	55/44									17	8	15	9	25	11									22	15	16						7	0	556
26	(Australia) Kurt Kostecki	27/34									19	16	23	6	23	17									25	19	21						13	0	434
27	(Australia) Luke Youlden	26																							24	17	11	20	23	23			11	0	328
28	(Australia) Lee Holdsworth	25																															1	0	300
29	(Australia) James Moffat	6																															2	0	276
30	(Australia) David Russell	99																															3	0	258
31	(Australia) Craig Lowndes	88																															4	0	240
32	(Australia) Warren Luff	2																															5	0	222
33	(Australia) Dale Wood	8																															6	0	204
34	(Australia) Dean Fiore	14																															8	0	180
35	(Australia) Tim Blanchard	3																															9	0	168
36	(Australia) Alex Davison	17																															10	0	156
37	(New Zealand) Chris Pither	96																															12	0	138
38	(Australia) Dylan O'Keeffe	22																															14	0	126
39	(Australia) Zak Best	5																															15	0	120
40	(Australia) Michael Caruso	18																															16	0	114
41	(Australia) David Wall	4																															17	0	108
42	(Australia) Garth Tander	888																															18	0	102
43	(Australia) Jonathon Webb	19																															19	0	96
44	(Australia) Jack Perkins	9																															20	0	90
–	(Australia) Matt Campbell	7																															NC	0	0
–	(Australia) Tony D'Alberto	11																															Ret	0	0
–	(Australia) James Golding	20																															Ret	0	0
–	(Australia) Jayden Ojeda	35																															Ret	0	0
–	(Australia) Broc Feeney	39																															Ret	0	0
–	(Australia) Russell Ingall	39																															Ret	0	0
Pos.	Driver	No.	BAT1 (New South Wales)		SAN (Victoria (state))			SYM (Tasmania)			BEN (South Australia)			HID (Northern Territory)			TOW1 (Queensland)		TOW2 (Queensland)			SMP1 (New South Wales)			SMP2 (New South Wales)			SMP3 (New South Wales)			SMP4 (New South Wales)		BAT2 (New South Wales)	Pen.	Pts.

Key
Colour	Result
Gold	Winner
Silver	Second place
Bronze	Third place
Green	Other points position
Blue	Other classified position
Blue	Not classified, finished (NC)
Purple	Not classified, retired (Ret)
Red	Did not qualify (DNQ)
Red	Did not pre-qualify (DNPQ)
Black	Disqualified (DSQ)
White	Did not start (DNS)
White	Race cancelled (C)
Blank	Did not practice (DNP)
Blank	Excluded (EX)
Blank	Did not arrive (DNA)
Blank	Withdrawn (WD)
Blank	Did not enter (cell empty)
Text formatting	Meaning
**Bold**	Pole position
Italics	Fastest lap

=== Teams' championship ===
Pos.	Team	No.	BAT1 (New South Wales)		SAN (Victoria (state))			SYM (Tasmania)			BEN (South Australia)			HID (Northern Territory)			TOW1 (Queensland)		TOW2 (Queensland)			SMP1 (New South Wales)			SMP2 (New South Wales)			SMP3 (New South Wales)			SMP4 (New South Wales)		BAT2 (New South Wales)	Pen.	Pts.
1	Triple Eight Race Engineering	88	7	6	3	3	4	2	1	5	6	11	4	12	3	3	2	**2**	5	**2**	6	9	6	3	2	25	1	4	2	2	2	C	4	0	5649
1	Triple Eight Race Engineering	97	1	**1**	1	**1**	**1**	**1**	2	6	7	3	2	13	1	1	**1**	1	6	1	2	2	1	4	1	2	**23**	2	3	3	1	C	18	0	5649
2	Dick Johnson Racing	11	Ret	4	5	Ret	12	3	13	2	3	**1**	**Ret**	**Ret**	6	12	3	3	**2**	8	3	**1**	**DSQ**	**1**	12	**1**	2	**1**	**1**	9	**4**	C	Ret	0	4464
2	Dick Johnson Racing	17	3	7	22	10	5	5	3	3	8	2	3	14	**2**	**2**	9	4	11	4	5	7	2	5	3	4	7	7	5	12	9	C	10	0	4464
3	Tickford Racing	6	**20**	2	2	2	6	6	**4**	**4**	4	Ret	1	2	7	8	8	6	1	11	**1**	13	13	6	8	13	8	22	15	7	3	C	2	0	4016
3	Tickford Racing	44	8	Ret	9	7	15	11	22	9	12	4	8	10	10	5	7	11	8	16	7	22	18	12	15	3	Ret	21	19	13	20	C	7	0	4016
4	Walkinshaw Andretti United	2	5	13	24	15	13	23	17	17	16	6	14	11	12	14	11	13	21	14	11	18	12	18	10	16	22	Ret	10	14	23	C	5	0	3985
4	Walkinshaw Andretti United	25	2	3	**6**	4	24	4	6	1	2	Ret	5	1	4	4	14	9	3	3	9	6	7	7	14	8	3	11	4	8	5	C	**1**	0	3985
5	Erebus Motorsport	9	16	14	16	16	7	9	5	15	11	13	24	4	8	10	18	5	10	Ret	12	5	11	2	**11**	6	6	3	8	1	7	C	20	0	3626
5	Erebus Motorsport	99	11	12	17	13	2	10	16	18	9	5	11	8	15	24	13	15	22	7	14	3	4	15	23	20	Ret	4	9	11	8	C	3	0	3626
6	Brad Jones Racing	8	18	10	7	6	9	24	11	10	5	17	6	3	9	6	4	20	13	15	10	4	3	11	4	9	4	23	7	4	10	**C**	6	86	3521
6	Brad Jones Racing	14	10	18	14	14	8	14	14	16	15	19	13	Ret	14	21	22	7	9	5	4	14	10	23	5	26	9	12	13	5	14	C	8	86	3521
7	Team 18	18	4	5	4	11	10	7	7	11	25	9	18	22	5	7	10	16	20	10	8	12	17	10	18	10	15	13	6	19	12	C	16	25	3189
7	Team 18	20	19	8	12	8	22	8	9	14	13	10	9	21	13	16	23	21	7	6	18	19	15	20	9	5	18	6	12	6	6	C	Ret	25	3189
8	Kelly Grove Racing	7	15	9	8	5	11	22	10	22	**1**	7	10	15	17	Ret	12	12	19	20	16	15	8	13	Ret	7	10	10	16	24	15	C	NC	30	2818
8	Kelly Grove Racing	26	9	11	11	22	3	17	8	8	Ret	22	12	19	18	19	5	22	15	9	23	8	9	14	24	17	11	20	23	23	17	C	11	30	2818
9	Matt Stone Racing	34	13	17	23	18	14	13	15	21	21	18	16	5	24	25	19	DSQ	16	13	15	23	21	17	16	21	Ret	17	22	16	18	C	13	0	2245
9	Matt Stone Racing	35	12	16	19	19	21	18	18	7	18	20	21	16	21	23	24	18	12	22	19	24	20	22	21	22	13	8	11	17	19	C	Ret	0	2245
10	Brad Jones Racing	4	17	21	18	21	23	15	Ret	23	23	21	19	Ret	22	22	17	17	17	19	21	20	19	19	19	24	17	18	21	21	16	C	17	0	2013
10	Brad Jones Racing	96	Ret	15	15	Ret	18	19	20	20	22	Ret	20	17	20	20	16	14	Ret	Ret	Ret	16	16	16	13	11	20	14	18	15	Ret	C	12	0	2013
11	Team Sydney	19	14	22	21	17	20	21	Ret	13	20	Ret	17	Ret	16	13	21	Ret	Ret	21	20	11	23	Ret	17	14	19	16	17	22	21	C	19	0	1939
11	Team Sydney	22	Ret	20	20	20	19	20	19	24	24	14	Ret	18	Ret	18	20	19	18	17	17	17	22	21	20	23	12	15	24	18	22	C	14	0	1939
12	Blanchard Racing Team	3	Ret	DNS	13	9	17	17	12	12	14	15	7	7	19	9	6	8	4	12	22	10	5	9	7	12	5	9	20	20	13	C	9	0	1627
13	Tickford Racing	5	6	19	10	12	16	12	21	19	10	12	22	20	11	15	15	10	14	18	13	21	14	8	6	18	14	19	14	10	11	C	15	0	1486
14	Tickford Racing (w)	55									17	8	15	9	25	11									22	15	16							0	364
15	Walkinshaw Andretti United (w)	27									19	16	23	6	23	17									25	19	21							0	302
–	Triple Eight Race Engineering (w)	39																															Ret	0	0
Pos.	Team	No.	BAT1 (New South Wales)		SAN (Victoria (state))			SYM (Tasmania)			BEN (South Australia)			HID (Northern Territory)			TOW1 (Queensland)		TOW2 (Queensland)			SMP1 (New South Wales)			SMP2 (New South Wales)			SMP3 (New South Wales)			SMP4 (New South Wales)		BAT2 (New South Wales)	Pen.	Pts.

Key
Colour	Result
Gold	Winner
Silver	Second place
Bronze	Third place
Green	Other points position
Blue	Other classified position
Blue	Not classified, finished (NC)
Purple	Not classified, retired (Ret)
Red	Did not qualify (DNQ)
Red	Did not pre-qualify (DNPQ)
Black	Disqualified (DSQ)
White	Did not start (DNS)
White	Race cancelled (C)
Blank	Did not practice (DNP)
Blank	Excluded (EX)
Blank	Did not arrive (DNA)
Blank	Withdrawn (WD)
Blank	Did not enter (cell empty)
Text formatting	Meaning
**Bold**	Pole position
Italics	Fastest lap

- (w) denotes wildcard entry.

=== Sydney Cup ===
Pos.	Driver	No.	SMP1 (New South Wales)			SMP2 (New South Wales)			SMP3 (New South Wales)			SMP4 (New South Wales)		Pen.	Pts.
1	(New Zealand) Shane van Gisbergen	97	2	1	4	1	2	**23**	2	3	3	1	C	0	902
2	(Australia) Anton de Pasquale	11	**1**	**DSQ**	**1**	12	**1**	2	**1**	**1**	9	**4**	C	0	829
3	(Australia) Jamie Whincup	88	9	6	3	2	25	1	4	2	**2**	2	C	0	829
4	(Australia) Will Brown	9	5	11	2	**11**	6	6	3	8	1	7	C	0	745
5	(Australia) Will Davison	17	7	2	5	3	4	7	7	5	12	9	C	0	728
6	(Australia) Chaz Mostert	25	6	7	7	14	8	3	11	4	8	5	C	0	688
7	(Australia) Nick Percat	8	4	3	11	4	9	4	23	7	4	10	**C**	0	676
8	(Australia) Cam Waters	6	13	13	6	8	13	8	22	15	7	3	C	0	579
9	(Australia) Scott Pye	20	19	15	20	9	5	18	6	12	6	6	C	0	555
10	(Australia) Tim Slade	3	10	5	9	7	12	5	9	20	20	13	C	0	553
11	(Australia) Brodie Kostecki	99	3	4	15	23	20	Ret	4	9	11	8	C	0	539
12	(Australia) Todd Hazelwood	14	14	10	23	5	26	9	12	13	5	14	C	0	493
13	(Australia) Mark Winterbottom	18	12	17	10	18	10	15	13	6	19	12	C	0	473
14	(Australia) Jack Le Brocq	5	21	14	8	6	18	14	19	14	10	11	C	0	472
15	(New Zealand) Andre Heimgartner	7	15	8	13	Ret	7	10	10	16	24	15	C	0	432
16	(Australia) James Courtney	44	22	18	12	15	3	Ret	21	19	13	20	C	0	381
17	(Australia) Zane Goddard	35	24	20	22	21	22	13	8	11	17	19	C	0	368
18	(Australia) Bryce Fullwood	2	18	12	18	10	16	22	Ret	10	14	23	C	0	360
19	(Australia) Macauley Jones	96	16	16	16	13	11	20	14	18	15	Ret	C	0	352
20	(Australia) Jack Smith	4	20	19	19	19	24	17	18	21	21	16	C	0	331
21	(Australia) Garry Jacobson	22	17	22	21	20	23	12	15	24	18	22	C	0	325
22	(New Zealand) Fabian Coulthard	19	11	23	Ret	17	14	19	16	17	22	21	C	0	324
23	(Australia) Jake Kostecki	34	23	21	17	16	21	Ret	17	22	16	18	C	0	305
24	(Australia) David Reynolds	26	8	9	14							17	C	0	212
25	(Australia) Luke Youlden	26				24	17	11	20	23	23			0	184
26	(Australia) Thomas Randle	55				22	15	16						0	104
27	(Australia) Kurt Kostecki	27				25	19	21						0	80
Pos.	Driver	No.	SMP1 (New South Wales)			SMP2 (New South Wales)			SMP3 (New South Wales)			SMP4 (New South Wales)		Pen.	Pts.
