= 2024 Bathurst 500 =

(New South Wales) 2024 Bathurst 500
Event Information
- Round 1 of 12 in the 2024 Supercars Championship
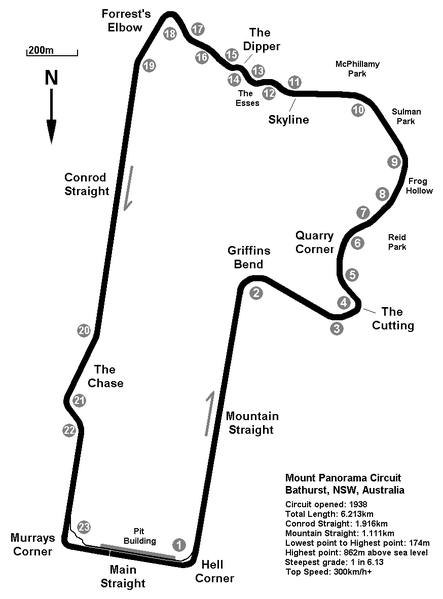
- Layout of the Mount Panorama Circuit
- Date: 23–25 February 2024
- Location: Bathurst, New South Wales
- Venue: Mount Panorama Circuit
- Weather: Fine

Results
Race 1
Distance	40 laps	248.520 km
Pole position	(Australia) Will Brown; Triple Eight Race Engineering	2:06.3740
Winner	(Australia) Broc Feeney; Triple Eight Race Engineering	1:36:15.9437
Race 2
Distance	40 laps	248.520 km
Pole position	(Australia) Broc Feeney; Triple Eight Race Engineering	2:06.5465
Winner	(Australia) Will Brown; Triple Eight Race Engineering	1:27:19.1560

The 2024 Bathurst 500 (commercially titled the 2024 Thrifty Bathurst 500) was a motor racing event for the Supercars Championship held from 23 to 25 February 2024. The event was held at the Mount Panorama Circuit in Bathurst, New South Wales, Australia and consisted of two 250 km races. It was the opening round of the 2024 Supercars Championship as well as the eighth running of an Australian Touring Car Championship/Supercars Championship sprint round at Mount Panorama-Wahluu.

== Results ==
=== Qualifying 1 ===
Pos.	No.	Driver	Team	Car	Times	
Pos.	No.	Driver	Team	Car	Regular	TTSO
1	87	(Australia) Will Brown	Triple Eight Race Engineering	Chevrolet Camaro Mk.6	+0.2983	2:06.3740
2	88	(Australia) Broc Feeney	Triple Eight Race Engineering	Chevrolet Camaro Mk.6	2:05.9872	+0.2065
3	25	(Australia) Chaz Mostert	Walkinshaw Andretti United	Ford Mustang S650	+0.3992	+0.2134
4	4	(Australia) Cameron Hill	Matt Stone Racing	Chevrolet Camaro Mk.6	+0.5383	+0.3501
5	26	(New Zealand) Richie Stanaway	Grove Racing	Ford Mustang S650	+0.5658	+0.5992
6	31	(Australia) James Golding	PremiAir Racing	Chevrolet Camaro Mk.6	+0.5248	+0.6962
7	99	(Australia) Todd Hazelwood	Erebus Motorsport	Chevrolet Camaro Mk.6	+0.4129	+0.8379
8	10	(Australia) Nick Percat	Matt Stone Racing	Chevrolet Camaro Mk.6	+0.6384	+0.9778
9	11	(Australia) Anton de Pasquale	Dick Johnson Racing	Ford Mustang S650	+0.4966	+1.0946
10	20	(Australia) David Reynolds	Team 18	Chevrolet Camaro Mk.6	+0.3436	No time
11	9	(Australia) Jack Le Brocq	Erebus Motorsport	Chevrolet Camaro Mk.6	+0.7304	
12	14	(Australia) Bryce Fullwood	Brad Jones Racing	Chevrolet Camaro Mk.6	+0.8073	
13	19	(New Zealand) Matthew Payne	Grove Racing	Ford Mustang S650	+0.8126	
14	2	(New Zealand) Ryan Wood	Walkinshaw Andretti United	Ford Mustang S650	+0.8173^{1}	
15	7	(Australia) James Courtney	Blanchard Racing Team	Ford Mustang S650	+0.8466	
16	55	(Australia) Thomas Randle	Tickford Racing	Ford Mustang S650	+0.9033	
17	8	(New Zealand) Andre Heimgartner	Brad Jones Racing	Chevrolet Camaro Mk.6	+0.9124	
18	23	(Australia) Tim Slade	PremiAir Racing	Chevrolet Camaro Mk.6	+0.9824	
19	100	(Australia) Mark Winterbottom	Team 18	Chevrolet Camaro Mk.6	+1.0088	
20	6	(Australia) Cam Waters	Tickford Racing	Ford Mustang S650	+1.0195	
21	17	(Australia) Will Davison	Dick Johnson Racing	Ford Mustang S650	+1.1538	
22	3	(Australia) Aaron Love	Blanchard Racing Team	Ford Mustang S650	+1.3039	
23	12	(New Zealand) Jaxon Evans	Brad Jones Racing	Chevrolet Camaro Mk.6	+1.5612	
24	96	(Australia) Macauley Jones	Brad Jones Racing	Chevrolet Camaro Mk.6	+1.5938^{1}	

- ^1 – Ryan Wood and Macauley Jones had their fastest times deleted for improving under yellow flag conditions.

=== Race 1 ===
Broc Feeney overhauled new Triple Eight team-mate Will Brown to win the opening race of the season. A safety car was called on the opening lap when rookie Ryan Wood found the sand at the first corner. Brown led in the first stint, but an error in his first pit-stop allowed Feeney to take the lead. Cameron Hill qualified a career-best fourth and briefly led in the first round of stops, but a mistake at Hell Corner dropped him down the order. Cam Waters struggled for pace outside the top 20 before losing a wheel late in the race at Griffins' Bend, causing a full course yellow. Aaron Love crashed at the Cutting twice in his first solo main game event, losing three laps to replace a broken toe-link after the first and causing a race-ending safety car after the second occurred with three laps to go.

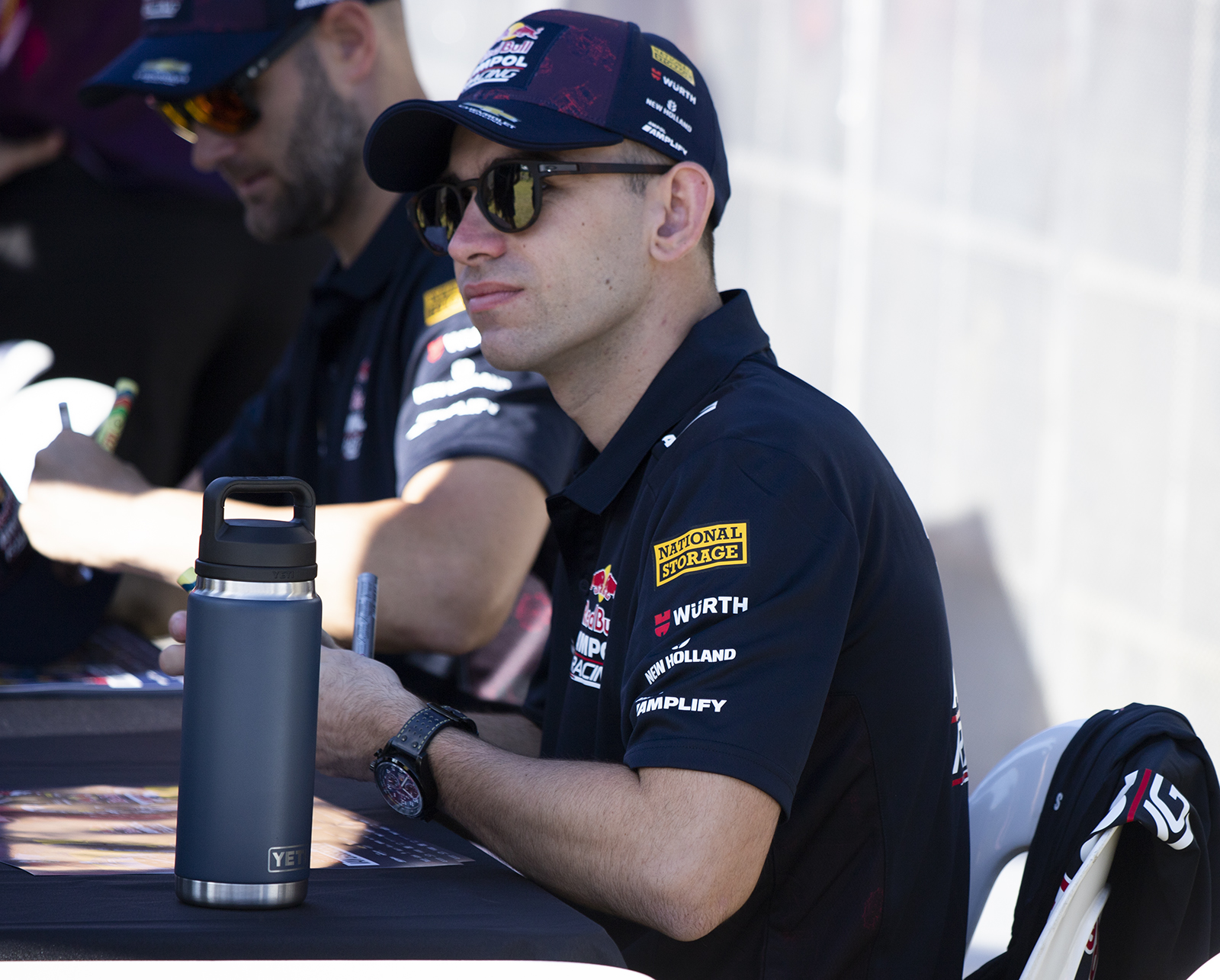
Broc Feeney (pictured in 2023) won Race 1.

Pos.	No.	Driver	Team	Car	Laps	Time/Retired	Grid	Pts.
1	88	(Australia) Broc Feeney	Triple Eight Race Engineering	Chevrolet Camaro Mk.6	40	1:36:15.9437	2	150
2	87	(Australia) Will Brown	Triple Eight Race Engineering	Chevrolet Camaro Mk.6	40	+0.3901	1	138
3	25	(Australia) Chaz Mostert	Walkinshaw Andretti United	Ford Mustang S650	40	+1.1323	3	129
4	26	(New Zealand) Richie Stanaway	Grove Racing	Ford Mustang S650	40	+1.5107	5	120
5	4	(Australia) Cameron Hill	Matt Stone Racing	Chevrolet Camaro Mk.6	40	+2.2634	4	111
6	10	(Australia) Nick Percat	Matt Stone Racing	Chevrolet Camaro Mk.6	40	+3.0867	8	102
7	14	(Australia) Bryce Fullwood	Brad Jones Racing	Chevrolet Camaro Mk.6	40	+3.9433	12	96
8	20	(Australia) David Reynolds	Team 18	Chevrolet Camaro Mk.6	40	+4.3837	10	90
9	8	(New Zealand) Andre Heimgartner	Brad Jones Racing	Chevrolet Camaro Mk.6	40	+5.1259	17	84
10	19	(New Zealand) Matthew Payne	Grove Racing	Ford Mustang S650	40	+5.5967	13	78
11	99	(Australia) Todd Hazelwood	Erebus Motorsport	Chevrolet Camaro Mk.6	40	+6.0162	7	72
12	100	(Australia) Mark Winterbottom	Team 18	Chevrolet Camaro Mk.6	40	+6.9256	19	69
13	9	(Australia) Jack Le Brocq	Erebus Motorsport	Chevrolet Camaro Mk.6	40	+8.4292	11	66
14	55	(Australia) Thomas Randle	Tickford Racing	Ford Mustang S650	40	+8.8470	16	63
15	7	(Australia) James Courtney	Blanchard Racing Team	Ford Mustang S650	40	+9.7171	15	60
16	17	(Australia) Will Davison	Dick Johnson Racing	Ford Mustang S650	40	+10.3159	21	57
17	23	(Australia) Tim Slade	PremiAir Racing	Chevrolet Camaro Mk.6	40	+10.8511	18	54
18	31	(Australia) James Golding	PremiAir Racing	Chevrolet Camaro Mk.6	40	+11.6344	6	51
19	96	(Australia) Macauley Jones	Brad Jones Racing	Chevrolet Camaro Mk.6	40	+12.3675	24	48
20	12	(New Zealand) Jaxon Evans	Brad Jones Racing	Chevrolet Camaro Mk.6	40	+12.7523	23	45
21	11	(Australia) Anton de Pasquale	Dick Johnson Racing	Ford Mustang S650	40	+13.8406	9	42
22	6	(Australia) Cam Waters	Tickford Racing	Ford Mustang S650	35	+ 5 Laps	20	
DNF	3	(Australia) Aaron Love	Blanchard Racing Team	Ford Mustang S650	33	Crash	22	
DNF	2	(New Zealand) Ryan Wood	Walkinshaw Andretti United	Ford Mustang S650	0	Steering	14	
Fastest Lap: Chaz Mostert (Walkinshaw Andretti United), 2:08.0797 on Lap 33

=== Qualifying 2 ===
Pos.	No.	Driver	Team	Car	Times	
Pos.	No.	Driver	Team	Car	Regular	TTSO
1	88	(Australia) Broc Feeney	Triple Eight Race Engineering	Chevrolet Camaro Mk.6	2:05.3317	2:06.5465
2	25	(Australia) Chaz Mostert	Walkinshaw Andretti United	Ford Mustang S650	+0.1011	+0.0988
3	87	(Australia) Will Brown	Triple Eight Race Engineering	Chevrolet Camaro Mk.6	+0.0676	+0.1772
4	31	(Australia) James Golding	PremiAir Racing	Chevrolet Camaro Mk.6	+0.3330	+0.4080
5	20	(Australia) David Reynolds	Team 18	Chevrolet Camaro Mk.6	+0.3230	+0.6144
6	9	(Australia) Jack Le Brocq	Erebus Motorsport	Chevrolet Camaro Mk.6	+0.5913	+0.8352
7	55	(Australia) Thomas Randle	Tickford Racing	Ford Mustang S650	+0.4283	+0.8442
8	17	(Australia) Will Davison	Dick Johnson Racing	Ford Mustang S650	+0.6461	+0.8791
9	10	(Australia) Nick Percat	Matt Stone Racing	Chevrolet Camaro Mk.6	+0.7193	+0.9159
10	11	(Australia) Anton de Pasquale	Dick Johnson Racing	Ford Mustang S650	+0.3165	+0.9652
11	2	(New Zealand) Ryan Wood	Walkinshaw Andretti United	Ford Mustang S650	+0.7328	
12	99	(Australia) Todd Hazelwood	Erebus Motorsport	Chevrolet Camaro Mk.6	+0.7337	
13	19	(New Zealand) Matthew Payne	Grove Racing	Ford Mustang S650	+0.7617	
14	4	(Australia) Cameron Hill	Matt Stone Racing	Chevrolet Camaro Mk.6	+0.7707	
15	26	(New Zealand) Richie Stanaway	Grove Racing	Ford Mustang S650	+0.8457	
16	3	(Australia) Aaron Love	Blanchard Racing Team	Ford Mustang S650	+0.8873	
17	23	(Australia) Tim Slade	PremiAir Racing	Chevrolet Camaro Mk.6	+0.9179	
18	6	(Australia) Cam Waters	Tickford Racing	Ford Mustang S650	+0.9188	
19	8	(New Zealand) Andre Heimgartner	Brad Jones Racing	Chevrolet Camaro Mk.6	+0.9390	
20	14	(Australia) Bryce Fullwood	Brad Jones Racing	Chevrolet Camaro Mk.6	+1.0260	
21	100	(Australia) Mark Winterbottom	Team 18	Chevrolet Camaro Mk.6	+1.0478	
22	7	(Australia) James Courtney	Blanchard Racing Team	Ford Mustang S650	+1.0539	
23	96	(Australia) Macauley Jones	Brad Jones Racing	Chevrolet Camaro Mk.6	+1.0563	
24	12	(New Zealand) Jaxon Evans	Brad Jones Racing	Chevrolet Camaro Mk.6	+1.2354	

=== Race 2 ===
Feeney qualified on pole but made a slow start, allowing Mostert and James Golding to pass. Ryan Wood, Richie Stanaway and Cameron Hill collided in the midfield, resulting in a half-spin and damage to the front-left corner for Hill. Wood later retired from the race as a result of the damage caused, having only completed 7 racing laps all weekend. At the end of the opening lap, Feeney made a dive on Golding at the Chase but pushed the PremiAir driver off the road – giving the Race 1 winner a pit-stop penalty. Having crashed twice in Race 1, Aaron Love crashed again in Race 2 – this time at Reid Park, delaying him in the pits for three laps to repair the damage. Having led for the opening two stints, Mostert relinquished the lead to Brown in the last pit cycle having suffered from a sticking wheel-nut. The same drivers finished on the podium in Race 2 as in Race 1, but in a different order as Brown led Mostert and Feeney over the line.

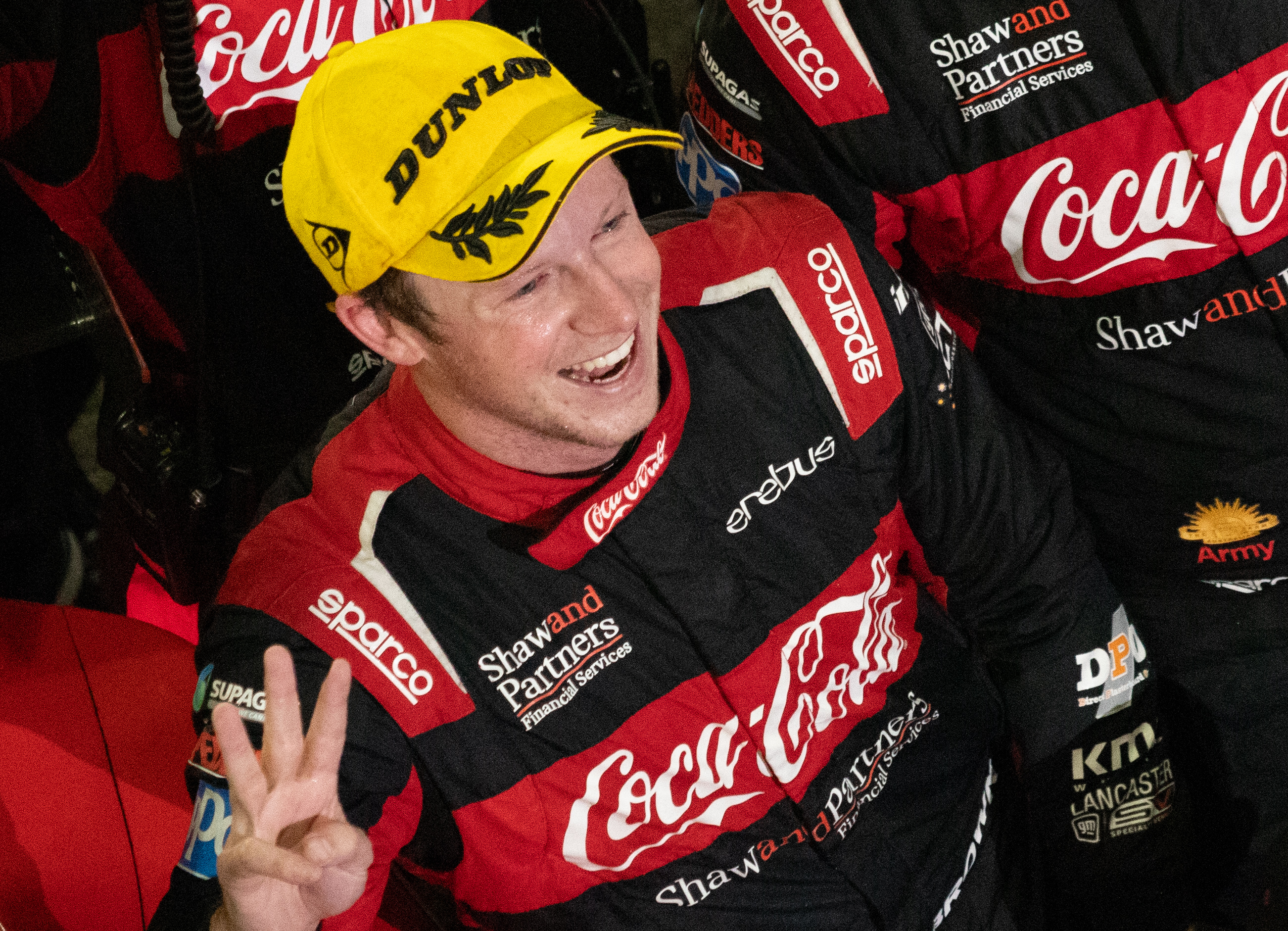
Will Brown (pictured in 2023) won Race 2.

Pos.	No.	Driver	Team	Car	Laps	Time/Retired	Grid	Pts.
1	87	(Australia) Will Brown	Triple Eight Race Engineering	Chevrolet Camaro Mk.6	40	1:27:19.1560	3	150
2	25	(Australia) Chaz Mostert	Walkinshaw Andretti United	Ford Mustang S650	40	+1.5535	2	138
3	88	(Australia) Broc Feeney	Triple Eight Race Engineering	Chevrolet Camaro Mk.6	40	+2.7305	1	129
4	55	(Australia) Thomas Randle	Tickford Racing	Ford Mustang S650	40	+22.6834	7	120
5	31	(Australia) James Golding	PremiAir Racing	Chevrolet Camaro Mk.6	40	+24.0407	4	111
6	20	(Australia) David Reynolds	Team 18	Chevrolet Camaro Mk.6	40	+26.2710	5	102
7	19	(New Zealand) Matthew Payne	Grove Racing	Ford Mustang S650	40	+27.3572	13	96
8	9	(Australia) Jack Le Brocq	Erebus Motorsport	Chevrolet Camaro Mk.6	40	+34.9165	6	90
9	10	(Australia) Nick Percat	Matt Stone Racing	Chevrolet Camaro Mk.6	40	+35.2489	9	84
10	17	(Australia) Will Davison	Dick Johnson Racing	Ford Mustang S650	40	+42.6161	8	78
11	26	(New Zealand) Richie Stanaway	Grove Racing	Ford Mustang S650	40	+42.8844	15	72
12	14	(Australia) Bryce Fullwood	Brad Jones Racing	Chevrolet Camaro Mk.6	40	+43.6288	20	69
13	99	(Australia) Todd Hazelwood	Erebus Motorsport	Chevrolet Camaro Mk.6	40	+45.4316	12	66
14	100	(Australia) Mark Winterbottom	Team 18	Chevrolet Camaro Mk.6	40	+46.2856	21	63
15	11	(Australia) Anton de Pasquale	Dick Johnson Racing	Ford Mustang S650	40	+56.1119	10	60
16	6	(Australia) Cam Waters	Tickford Racing	Ford Mustang S650	40	+58.0158	18	57
17	23	(Australia) Tim Slade	PremiAir Racing	Chevrolet Camaro Mk.6	40	+1:00.4249	17	54
18	8	(New Zealand) Andre Heimgartner	Brad Jones Racing	Chevrolet Camaro Mk.6	40	+1:00.5947	19	51
19	7	(Australia) James Courtney	Blanchard Racing Team	Ford Mustang S650	40	+1:11.7787	22	48
20	96	(Australia) Macauley Jones	Brad Jones Racing	Chevrolet Camaro Mk.6	40	+1:11.9264	23	45
21	12	(New Zealand) Jaxon Evans	Brad Jones Racing	Chevrolet Camaro Mk.6	40	+2:13.3187	24	42
22	3	(Australia) Aaron Love	Blanchard Racing Team	Ford Mustang S650	37	+3 laps	16	39
23	4	(Australia) Cameron Hill	Matt Stone Racing	Chevrolet Camaro Mk.6	31	+9 laps	14	36
DNF	2	(New Zealand) Ryan Wood	Walkinshaw Andretti United	Ford Mustang S650	7	Crash damage	11	
Fastest Lap: Broc Feeney (Triple Eight Race Engineering), 2:07.6228 on Lap 32

== Championship standings ==
Drivers' Championship standings

Pos.	Driver	Points	Gap
1	(Australia) Will Brown	288	
2	(Australia) Broc Feeney	279	+9
3	(Australia) Chaz Mostert	267	+21
4	(New Zealand) Richie Stanaway	192	+96
4	(Australia) David Reynolds	192	+96

Teams' Championship standings

Pos.	Constructor	Points	Gap
1	Triple Eight Race Engineering	567	
2	Grove Racing	366	+201
3	Matt Stone Racing	333	+234
4	Team 18	324	+243
5	Brad Jones Racing (#8, #14)	300	+267

- Note: Only the top five positions are included for both sets of standings.
