= Sydney 500 (Sydney Motorsport Park) =

Supercars Championship event held in Eastern Creek, Australia

(New South Wales) Sydney 500
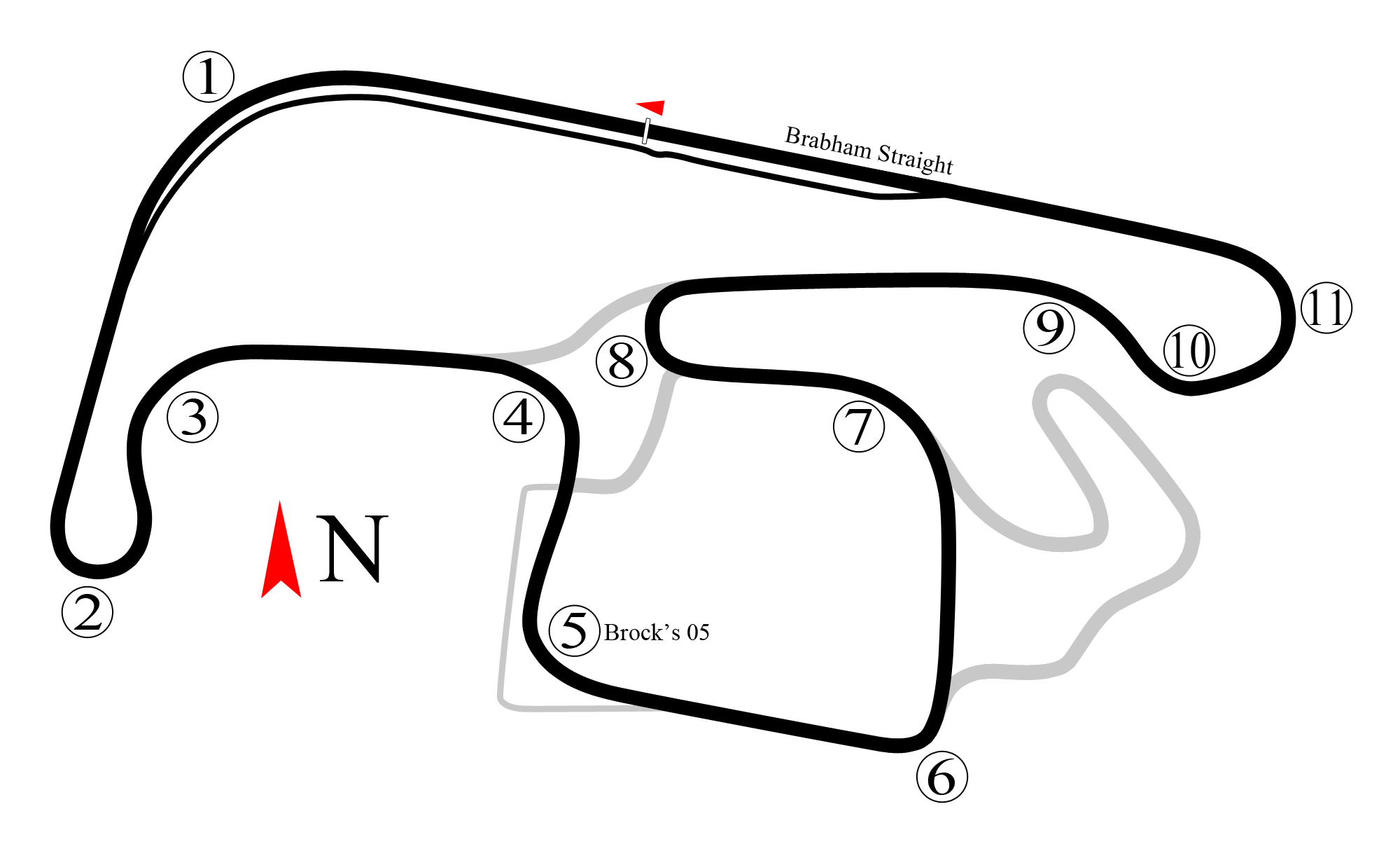
- Race Information
Venue	Sydney Motorsport Park
Number of times held	34
First held	1992
- Race Format
- Race 1
Laps	26
Distance	100 km
- Race 2
Laps	52
Distance	200 km
- Race 3
Laps	52
Distance	200 km
- Last Event (2026)
- Overall Winner
(Australia) Broc Feeney	Triple Eight Race Engineering
- Race Winners
(Australia) Broc Feeney	Triple Eight Race Engineering
(Australia) Anton De Pasquale	Team 18
(Australia) Broc Feeney	Triple Eight Race Engineering

The Sydney 500 (known for sponsorship reasons as the DUNLOP Sydney 500) is the current name for the annual motor racing event for Supercars, held at Sydney Motorsport Park in Eastern Creek, New South Wales. The event has been a semi-regular part of the Supercars Championship—and its previous incarnations, the Australian Touring Car Championship, Shell Championship Series and V8 Supercars Championship—since 1992.

Since 2018, this is the only active Supercars event held in metropolitan Sydney. In 2020, the event was held twice due to calendar changes caused by the COVID-19 pandemic. In 2021, it was held four times in four consecutive weekends, again due to the pandemic.

== Format ==
While various formats have been used in its history, the event is currently held over three days, from Friday to Sunday. Following practice on Friday, a two-part knockout qualifying session determines the grid for the following 100 kilometre race. On Saturday and Sunday, a three-part knockout qualifying session, culminating in a top ten shootout, determines the grid for the following 200 km race.

== History ==
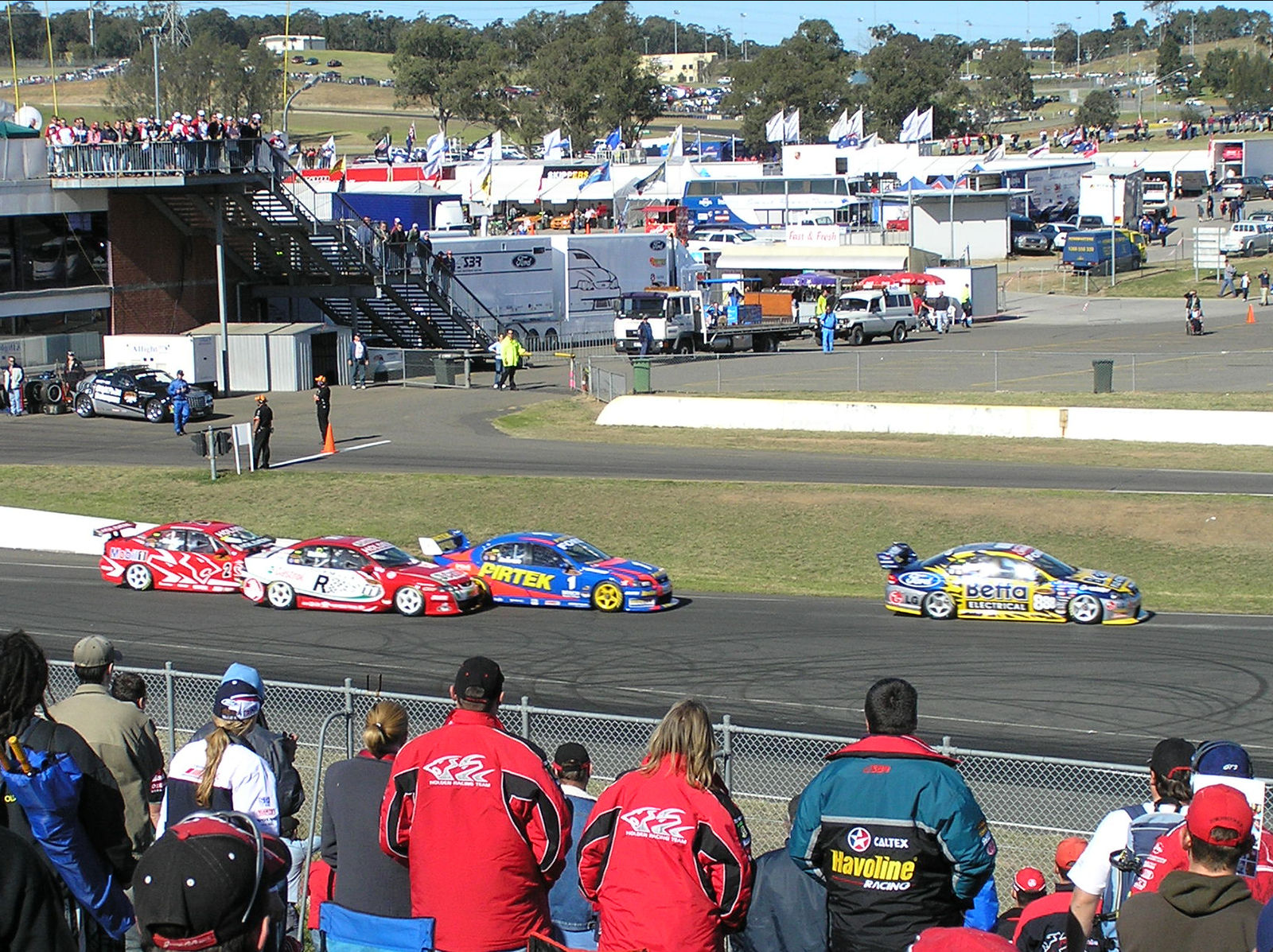
The start of a race during the 2005 event.

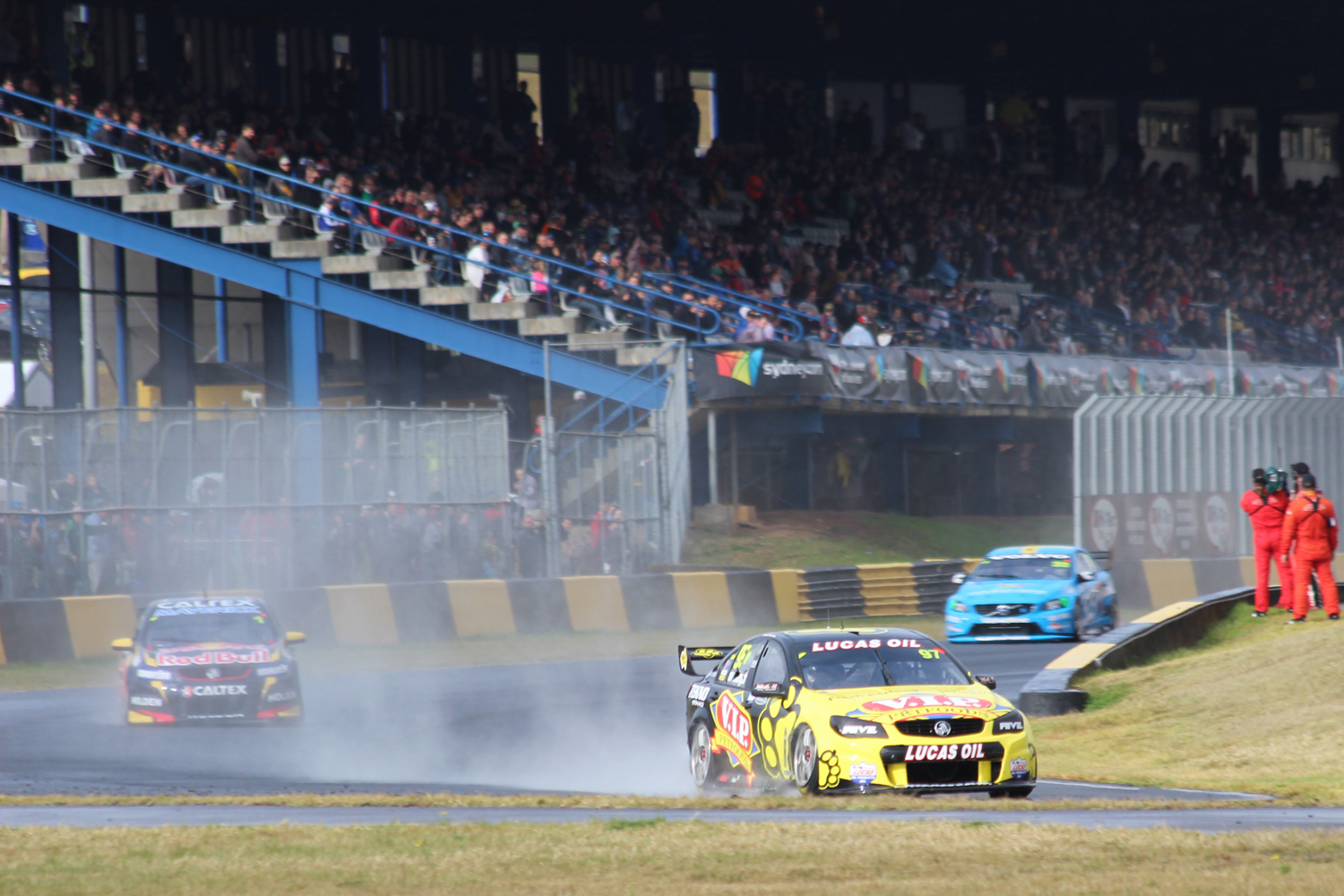
Shane van Gisbergen leading in wet conditions during the 2014 event.

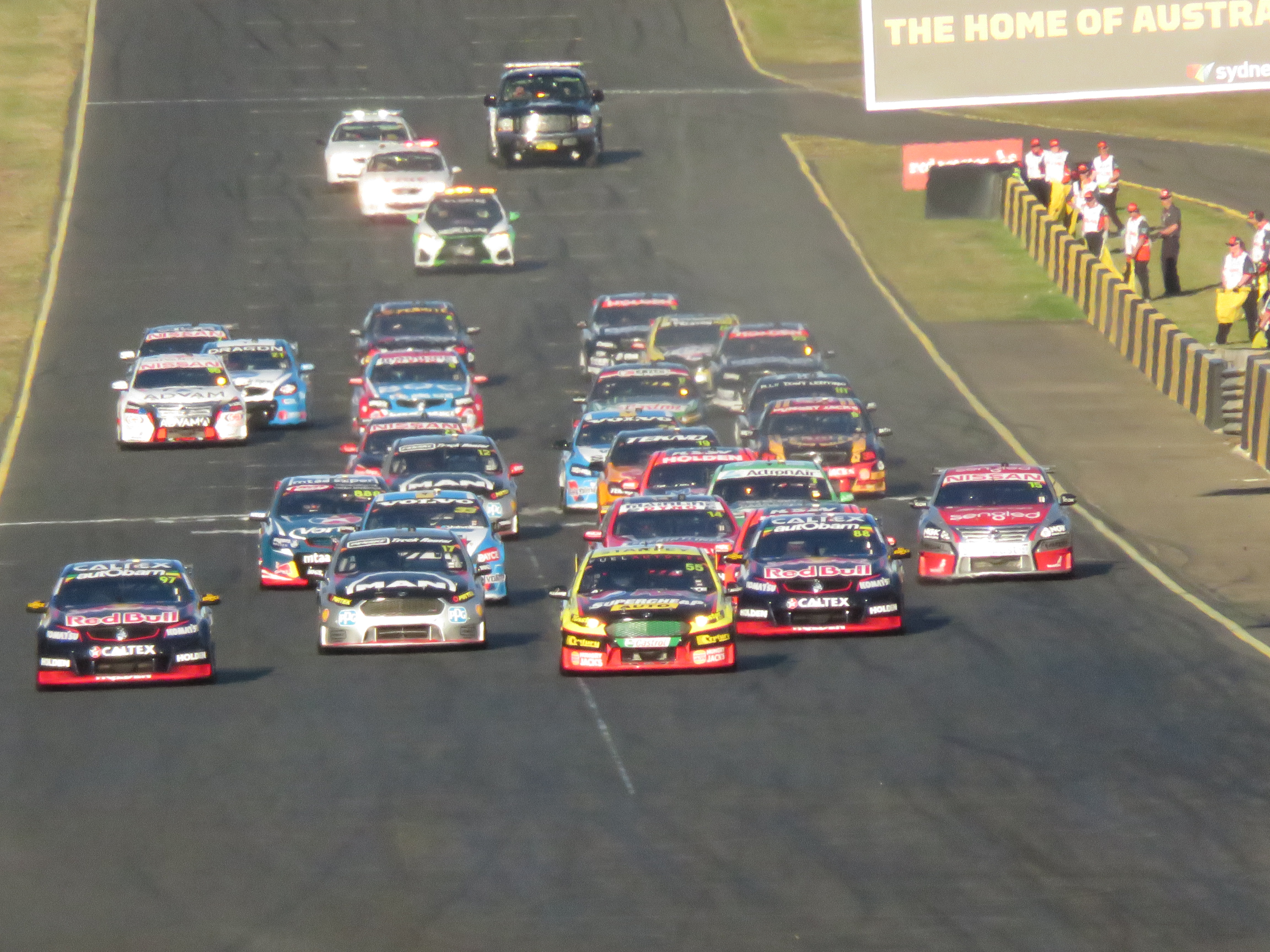
The start of a race during the 2016 event.

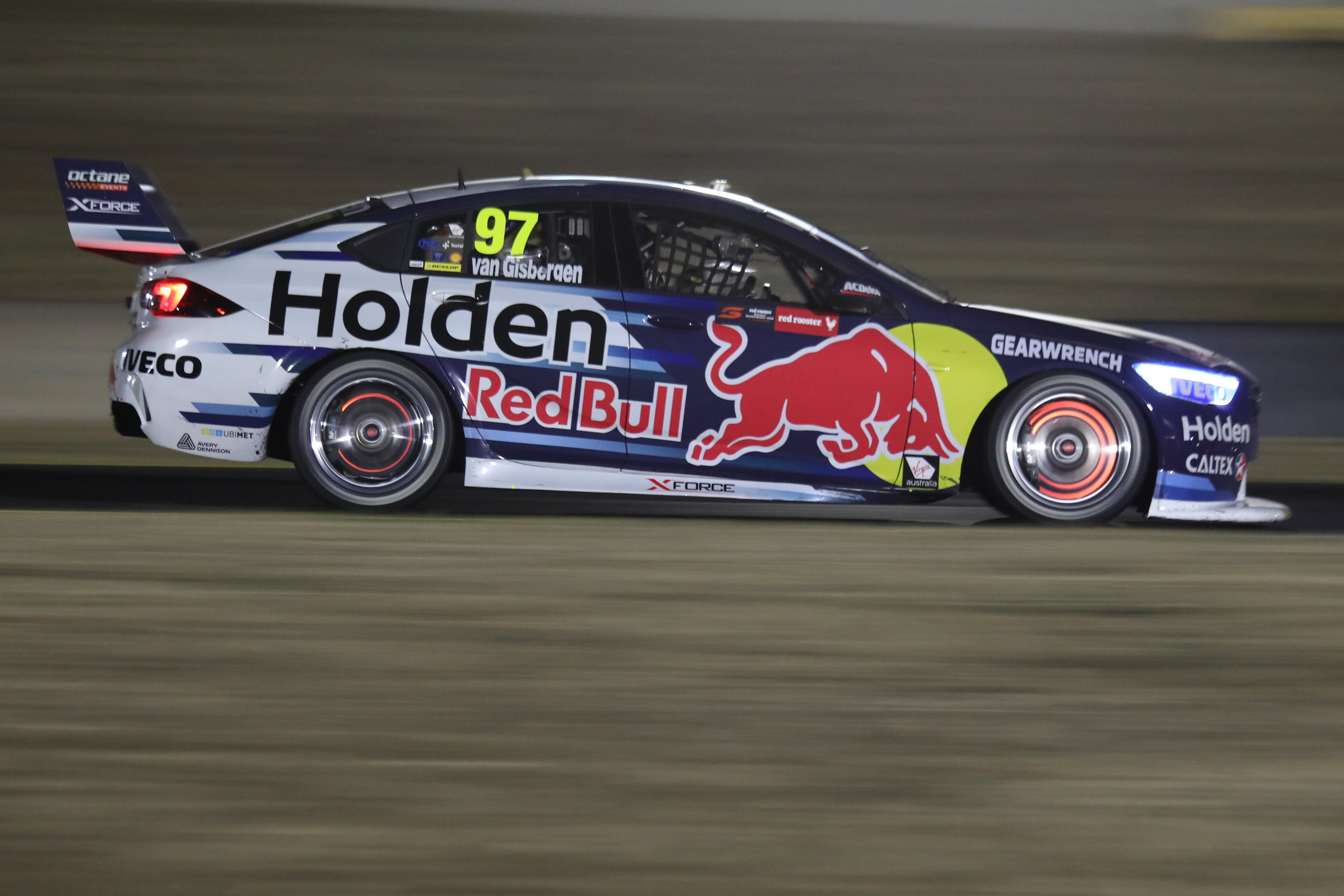
Shane van Gisbergen won the inaugural Sydney SuperNight 300 in 2018

=== 1990s ===
Opened in 1990 as Eastern Creek Raceway, the circuit hosted non-championship events before its first official ATCC event in 1992, including the 1990 Nissan Sydney 500 and the Winfield Triple Challenge. John Bowe won both races of the inaugural championship event, holding on in a close battle with Tony Longhurst in the first race. In 1994, Peter Brock scored the first race and round victories in the ATCC for the Holden Racing Team. The 1996 event was held on the shorter 'North' version of the circuit, enabling the third race of the event to be held at night. Craig Lowndes won the event, becoming the first driver to win an ATCC round on debut since David McKay won the very first ATCC round in 1960. Russell Ingall and Steven Richards also made their ATCC debuts on that weekend. The event was dropped from the calendar in 1998 but returned in 1999, a year which began a four-event winning streak for Mark Skaife and the Holden Racing Team at the event.

=== 2000s ===
In the first race of the 2001 round, Greg Murphy was credited with a race win despite finishing third, after top two Lowndes and Marcos Ambrose were given post-race penalties for separate incidents. Murphy himself was then penalised for a jump start in the second race giving Skaife the race and round victory. Ambrose ended the Holden Racing Team streak by winning in 2003, the first of two championship events the circuit would hold in 2003 and 2004, the second being the season finale. was won by Marcos Ambrose, who secured his first championship win in the process. The 2003 event is perhaps best remembered for an incident between Russell Ingall and Mark Skaife, which has since been dubbed the "race rage" incident or the "shriek at the creek". Ingall and Skaife made contact exiting Turn 9 which resulted in Skaife being spun into the wall. Having parked his damaged car on the other side of the track, Skaife remained next to his car, waiting for Ingall to return on the following lap. Skaife walked towards the edge of the circuit, shaking his fist at Ingall, and Ingall responded by swerving towards Skaife. Ingall was disqualified from the event and both drivers were fined.

In 2004's first round, Rick Kelly broke the record for the lowest starting position from which an ATCC or Supercars round had been won, winning from seventeenth on the grid in wet conditions. Lowndes and Garth Tander, who completed the podium, started sixteenth and fifteenth respectively in a very wet race. In 2004's finale, Ambrose claimed his second successive championship title in race shortened due to heavy rain. In 2005, Lowndes took the first Supercars race and round win for Triple Eight Race Engineering, before the event dropped off the calendar again in 2006. In winning the event in 2007, Skaife broke Peter Brock's long-standing record of 37 round victories in the ATCC and Supercars Championship, taking his 38th win which was also his final solo round win. His teammate Todd Kelly made it a one-two finish for the Holden Racing Team, while Jamie Whincup was disqualified from the third race for using illegal rear brake rotors. The event was held on the Queen's Birthday long weekend, with qualifying and the first race on Sunday and the final two races on the Monday. In 2008, Will Davison took his first Supercars round win and the first for Dick Johnson Racing since 2001. Eastern Creek was dropped from the calendar in 2009, with the Sydney event moving to the Homebush Street Circuit, known as the Sydney 500.

=== 2010s ===
After hosting the series' pre-season test day in 2011, the renamed Sydney Motorsport Park returned to the Supercars calendar in 2012 as a late addition. As part of the renovation and name change, the layout was slightly changed, with the kink at turn 6 removed. The circuit was again removed from the calendar in 2013 before returning in 2014. The 2014 and 2015 events included rain-affected races, with the events won by Shane van Gisbergen and Chaz Mostert respectively. In the 2016 event Jamie Whincup won his 100th championship race, defeating Craig Lowndes, who was driving in his record 600th championship race, in a race-long battle. One year later, Whincup won his 106th championship race at the Sydney event, surpassing Lowndes' record of 105 wins.

In 2018, the event format changed to feature a single 300 kilometre race at night, the first event under lights in the championship since the 2011 Yas V8 400 and the first in Australia since the 1997 Calder Park round. It was originally planned to use the 2.8km Druitt circuit, similar to what was used for the 1996 night event, however after further testing of the lighting system, it was decided that the 3.9km Gardner Circuit would be used, like all other previous events at the circuit. The race itself was won by van Gisbergen, who overtook Scott McLaughlin in a late race battle following a safety car. The event was excluded from the schedule for the 2019 Supercars Championship, with an intention of returning to the calendar early in the 2020 season with permanent lights to be installed.

=== 2020s ===
As intended, the event was announced as part of the 2020 Supercars Championship, albeit retaining its previous August slot. However, the event was then brought forward to June as the return race for the championship after it was suspended due to the COVID-19 pandemic. The event was run as a two-day daytime event run behind closed doors. In addition to this, it was later announced the circuit will host a second event in 2020, as in 2003 and 2004. After the first of these was held, won by McLaughlin, a third day/night event at the circuit was scheduled for July 2020, to replace the Winton Super400 which was postponed due to further border restrictions caused by the pandemic. The second 2020 event had dual tyre compounds which led to mixed race results, including the first championship race victory for Jack Le Brocq, due to high degradation and a limited tyre bank. Despite the mixed results, McLaughlin again won the round. The planned third event for the year was later cancelled.

In 2021, with the calendar again disrupted by the pandemic, four consecutive rounds at the circuit were held in October and November to reach the minimum contractual number of 12 events. Anton de Pasquale was the standout driver over the month, with seven poles and five wins over the eleven scheduled races in the block. Meanwhile, Will Brown won his first championship race, and David Reynolds was forced to miss the second and third events due to his request for a COVID-19 vaccination exemption being denied by NSW Health after the first event. The final race of the fourth weekend was abandoned due to heavy rain, which was also enough to guarantee a second championship for van Gisbergen.

In 2022, 2025 and 2026, the event was the opening round of the championship. The 2025 event, the first with races over three days, was notable for Cameron Waters sweeping the event with three poles, three wins and three fastest laps. This included a Saturday victory over Broc Feeney by 0.0308 seconds, the closest race finish since the 1983 Adelaide International Raceway round. Despite the dominant start, Waters would not win a further race over the remainder of the season.

== Winners ==
The Grand Prix layout used from 1992–95 and 1997–2008

Year	Driver	Team	Car	Report
1992	(Australia) John Bowe	Dick Johnson Racing	Ford Sierra RS500	
1993	(Australia) Glenn Seton	Glenn Seton Racing	Ford EB Falcon	
1994	(Australia) Peter Brock	Holden Racing Team	Holden VP Commodore	Report
1995	(Australia) Mark Skaife	Gibson Motorsport	Holden VR Commodore	
1996^{1}	(Australia) Craig Lowndes	Holden Racing Team	Holden VR Commodore	
1997	(Australia) Glenn Seton	Glenn Seton Racing	Ford EL Falcon	
1998	not held			
1999	(Australia) Mark Skaife	Holden Racing Team	Holden VT Commodore	Report
2000	(Australia) Mark Skaife	Holden Racing Team	Holden VT Commodore	
2001	(Australia) Mark Skaife	Holden Racing Team	Holden VX Commodore	Report
2002	(Australia) Mark Skaife	Holden Racing Team	Holden VX Commodore	
2003^{2}	(Australia) Marcos Ambrose	Stone Brothers Racing	Ford BA Falcon	
2003^{2}	(Australia) Marcos Ambrose	Stone Brothers Racing	Ford BA Falcon	
2004^{2}	(Australia) Rick Kelly	Kmart Racing Team	Holden VY Commodore	
2004^{2}	(Australia) Marcos Ambrose	Stone Brothers Racing	Ford BA Falcon	
2005	(Australia) Craig Lowndes	Triple Eight Race Engineering	Ford BA Falcon	
2006	not held			
2007	(Australia) Mark Skaife	Holden Racing Team	Holden VE Commodore	Report
2008	(Australia) Will Davison	Dick Johnson Racing	Ford BF Falcon	Report
2009 – 2011	not held			
2012	(Australia) Craig Lowndes	Triple Eight Race Engineering	Holden VE Commodore	Report
2013	not held			
2014	(New Zealand) Shane van Gisbergen	Tekno Autosports	Holden VF Commodore	Report
2015	(Australia) Chaz Mostert	Prodrive Racing Australia	Ford FG X Falcon	Report
2016	(Australia) Jamie Whincup	Triple Eight Race Engineering	Holden VF Commodore	Report
2017	(New Zealand) Fabian Coulthard	DJR Team Penske	Ford FG X Falcon	Report
2018	(New Zealand) Shane van Gisbergen	Triple Eight Race Engineering	Holden ZB Commodore	Report
2019	not held			
2020^{3}	(New Zealand) Scott McLaughlin	DJR Team Penske	Ford Mustang GT	Report
2020^{3}	(New Zealand) Scott McLaughlin	DJR Team Penske	Ford Mustang GT	
2021^{4}	(New Zealand) Shane van Gisbergen	Triple Eight Race Engineering	Holden ZB Commodore	Report
2021^{4}	(Australia) Anton De Pasquale	Dick Johnson Racing	Ford Mustang GT	
2021^{4}	(Australia) Anton De Pasquale	Dick Johnson Racing	Ford Mustang GT	
2021^{4}	(New Zealand) Shane van Gisbergen	Triple Eight Race Engineering	Holden ZB Commodore	
2022	(Australia) Chaz Mostert	Walkinshaw Andretti United	Holden ZB Commodore	Report
2023	(New Zealand) Shane van Gisbergen	Triple Eight Race Engineering	Chevrolet Camaro ZL1-1LE	Report
2024	(Australia) Chaz Mostert	Walkinshaw Andretti United	Ford Mustang S650	Report
2025	(Australia) Cameron Waters	Tickford Racing	Ford Mustang S650	Report
2026	(Australia) Broc Feeney	Triple Eight Race Engineering	Ford Mustang S650	Report

Notes

- ^1 – The 1996 event was held on the original North Circuit. All other years have been held on the Grand Prix (Gardner) layout.
- ^2 – In 2003 and 2004, Sydney Motorsport Park (née Eastern Creek) also hosted a second round of the V8 Supercars Championship Series, the season finale.
- ^3 – In 2020, Sydney Motorsport Park hosted consecutive rounds of the Supercars Championship, each known as the Sydney SuperSprint.
- ^4 – In 2021, Sydney Motorsport Park hosted four consecutive rounds of the Supercars Championship, three known as the Sydney SuperNight and one known as the Sydney SuperSprint

== Multiple winners ==
=== By driver ===
Wins	Driver	Years
6	(Australia) Mark Skaife	1995, 1999, 2000, 2001, 2002, 2007
5	(New Zealand) Shane van Gisbergen	2014, 2018, 2021-1, 2021-4, 2023
3	(Australia) Marcos Ambrose	2003-1, 2003-2, 2004-2
3	(Australia) Craig Lowndes	1996, 2005, 2012
3	(Australia) Chaz Mostert	2015, 2022, 2024
2	(Australia) Glenn Seton	1993, 1997
2	(New Zealand) Scott McLaughlin	2020-1, 2020-2
2	(Australia) Anton De Pasquale	2021-2, 2021-3

=== By team ===
Wins	Team
9	Walkinshaw Andretti United^{5}
8	Triple Eight Race Engineering
7	Dick Johnson Racing^{6}
3	Stone Brothers Racing
2	Glenn Seton Racing
2	Tickford Racing^{7}

=== By manufacturer ===
Wins	Manufacturer
17	Ford
16	Holden
1	Chevrolet

Notes

- ^5 – Walkinshaw Andretti United was known as Holden Racing Team from 1990 to 2016, hence their statistics are combined.
- ^6 – Dick Johnson Racing was known as DJR Team Penske from 2015 to 2020, hence their statistics are combined.
- ^7 – Tickford Racing was known as Prodrive Racing Australia from 2015 to 2017, hence their statistics are combined.

== Event names and sponsors ==
- 1992–97, 1999–2005, 2007–08: Eastern Creek
- 2003: VIP Petfoods Main Event
- 2004: BigPond Grand Finale
- 2012: Sydney Motorsport Park 360
- 2014: Sydney Motorsport Park 400
- 2015: Sydney Super Sprint
- 2016–17: Red Rooster SuperSprint
- 2018: Red Rooster Sydney SuperNight 300
- 2020–21: BP Ultimate Sydney SuperSprint
- 2020: Truck Assist Sydney SuperSprint
- 2021: Bunnings Trade Sydney SuperNight
- 2021: Armor All Sydney SuperNight
- 2021–2023: Beaurepaires Sydney SuperNight
- 2024: Panasonic Air Conditioning Sydney SuperNight
- 2025: Thrifty Sydney 500
- 2026: DUNLOP Sydney 500

== See also ==
- List of Australian Touring Car Championship races
