= 2025 Race of Champions =

Motor racing competition

The 2025 Race of Champions was the 33rd running of the Race of Champions that took place on 7 and 8 March. The race took place in Australia for the first time and was the first time the event was held in the Southern Hemisphere. The event was located at Accor Stadium in Sydney, Australia.

== Participants ==
=== Nations Cup ===
Nations Cup team	Drivers	Championships won
(Sweden) (Australia) All-Stars (Note: This Team was originally named Team Sweden but Mattias Ekstrom had to withdraw from the event due to illness. He was replaced by Supercars Championship driver Chaz Mostert and the team was rebranded Team All-Stars)	Johan Kristoffersson	FIA World Rallycross Championship (2017, 2018, 2020, 2021, 2022, 2023, 2024); Extreme E (2021, 2023); Scandinavian Touring Car Championship (2012, 2018); Superstars Series (2012); Porsche Carrera Cup Scandinavia (2012, 2013, 2015)
(Sweden) (Australia) All-Stars	Chaz Mostert	Australian Formula Ford Championship (2010); TCR Australia Touring Car Series (2021); GT World Challenge Australia (2024)
Australia (Supercars)	Brodie Kostecki (Note: It was originally announced that Jamie Whincup was entered into the ROC but later had to withdraw due to the threat of Cyclone Alfred. He was replaced by Dick Johnson Racing Supercars Driver Brodie Kostecki.)	Supercars Championship (2023)
Australia (Supercars)	Will Brown	Australian Formula 4 Championship (2016); Toyota 86 Racing Series Australia (2016); TCR Australia Touring Car Series (2019); Supercars Championship (2024)
Australia (Off-Road)	Molly Taylor	Australian Rally Championship (2016); Extreme E (2021)
Australia (Off-Road)	Toby Price	Australian Off-Road Championship (2009, 2010, 2012, 2014, 2015); FIM Cross-Country Rallies World Championship (2018)
Finland	Valtteri Bottas	Formula Renault Eurocup (2008); Formula Renault NEC (2008); GP3 Series (2011)
Finland	Heikki Kovalainen	World Series by Nissan (2004); Super GT – GT500 (2016)
France	Sébastien Loeb	Junior World Rally Championship (2001); World Rally Championship (2004, 2005, 2006, 2007, 2008, 2009, 2010, 2011, 2012); Extreme E (2022)
France	Victor Martins	Formula Renault Eurocup (2020); FIA Formula 3 Championship (2022)
Germany	Sebastian Vettel	Formula BMW ADAC (2004); Formula One (2010, 2011, 2012, 2013)
Germany	Mick Schumacher	FIA Formula 3 European Championship (2018); FIA Formula 2 Championship (2020)
New Zealand	Hayden Paddon	Production World Rally Championship (2011); European Rally Championship (2023, 2024); New Zealand Rally Championship (2008-09, 2013, 2018, 2021-23); Asia-Pacific Rally Championship (2022)
New Zealand	Louis Sharp	F4 British Championship (2023); GB3 Championship (2024)
Norway	Oliver Solberg (Note: Oliver Solberg is Swedish but competed under the Norwegian Flag for the Nations Cup)	Latvian Rally Championship (2019)
Norway	Petter Solberg	World Rally Championship (2003); FIA World Rallycross Championship (2014, 2015)
United Kingdom	David Coulthard	Formula Ford 1600 Junior Series (1989)
United Kingdom	Alister McRae (Note: Originally Max McRae was entered but later withdrawn due to a hand injury and was replaced by his father Alister McRae)	Asia-Pacific Rally Championship (2011); British Rally Championship (1995)
United States	Travis Pastrana	Rally America National Championship (2006, 2007, 2008, 2009); Nitro Rallycross (2021); American Rally Association (2017)
United States	Kurt Busch	International Race of Champions (2003); NASCAR Cup Series (2004)

== Winners ==
Race of Champions		Nations Cup Winners				Other Trophies
Winner	Runner-up	Nation (winners)	Winning drivers	Nation (runner-up)	Runner up Drivers	Other Trophies
(France) Sébastien Loeb	(Australia) Chaz Mostert	France	Sébastien Loeb; Victor Martins	Australia (Supercars)	Brodie Kostecki; Will Brown	(Greece) Michael Romanidis (eROC)

== Draw ==
=== Drivers ===
==== Group Rounds ====
===== Group A =====
Pos.	Driver	Wins	Loss	Fastest Time
1	(Australia) Molly Taylor	2	0	
2	(Sweden) Johan Kristoffersson	1	1	
3	(Greece) Michael Romanidis (Note: Wildcard (winner of eROC))	0	2	

===== Group B =====
Pos.	Driver	Wins	Loss	Fastest Time
1	(Norway) Oliver Solberg	2	0	
2	(Finland) Heikki Kovalainen	1	1	
3	(United States) Travis Pastrana	0	2	

===== Group C =====
Pos.	Driver	Wins	Loss	Fastest Time
1	(Australia) Toby Price	1	1	01:01.552
2	(New Zealand) Hayden Paddon	1	1	01:01.924
3	(Norway) Petter Solberg	1	1	01:02.063

===== Group D =====
Pos.	Driver	Wins	Loss	Fastest Time
1	(Germany) Sebastian Vettel	2	0	
2	(Australia) Brodie Kostecki	1	1	
3	(New Zealand) Louis Sharp	0	2	

===== Group E =====
Pos.	Driver	Wins	Loss	Fastest Time
1	(Australia) Chaz Mostert	2	0	
2	(United States) Kurt Busch	1	1	
3	(Finland) Valtteri Bottas	0	2	

===== Group F =====
Pos.	Driver	Wins	Loss	Fastest Time
1	(Australia) Will Brown	2	0	
2	(France) Victor Martins	1	1	
3	(United Kingdom) David Coulthard	0	2	

==== Main Draw ====
Quarter Finals
(France) Sébastien Loeb	2
(Australia) Molly Taylor	0
(Norway) Oliver Solberg	2
(Australia) Toby Price	0
(Germany) Sebastian Vettel	0
(Australia) Chaz Mostert	2
(Germany) Mick Schumacher	0
(Australia) Will Brown	2

Semi Finals
(France) Sébastien Loeb	2
(Norway) Oliver Solberg	0
(Australia) Chaz Mostert	2
(Australia) Will Brown	0

Final
(France) Sébastien Loeb	2
(Australia) Chaz Mostert	0

=== Nations Cup ===
==== Group Stage ====
===== Group A =====
Pos.	Team	Wins	Losses	Time
1	Team France	4	0	02:02.600
2	(Australia) (Sweden) Team All Stars	1	3	02:12.570
3	Team Finland	1	3	02:06.439

===== Group B =====
Pos.	Team	Wins	Losses	Time
1	Team Australia (Supercars)	4	0	01:56.355
2	Team New Zealand	1	3	01:59.208
3	Team Australia (Off-Road)	1	3	01:59.456

===== Group C =====
Pos.	Team	Wins	Losses	Time
1	Team Germany	3	1	01:58.937
2	(United States) Team USA	3	1	01:59.304
3	(United Kingdom) Team Great Britain	0	4	02:01.528

==== Main Draw ====
Quarter-finals
Team Norway	0
(Sweden) (Australia) Team All-Stars	2
Team France	2
Team New Zealand	1
Team Australia (Supercars)	2
(United States) Team USA	0
Team Germany	2
Team Australia (Off-Road)	1

Semi-finals
(Sweden) (Australia) Team All-Stars	1
Team France	2
Team Australia (Supercars)	2
Team Germany	1

Final
Team France	2
Team Australia (Supercars)	1
