= Will Brown (racing driver) =

Australian racing driver (born 1998)

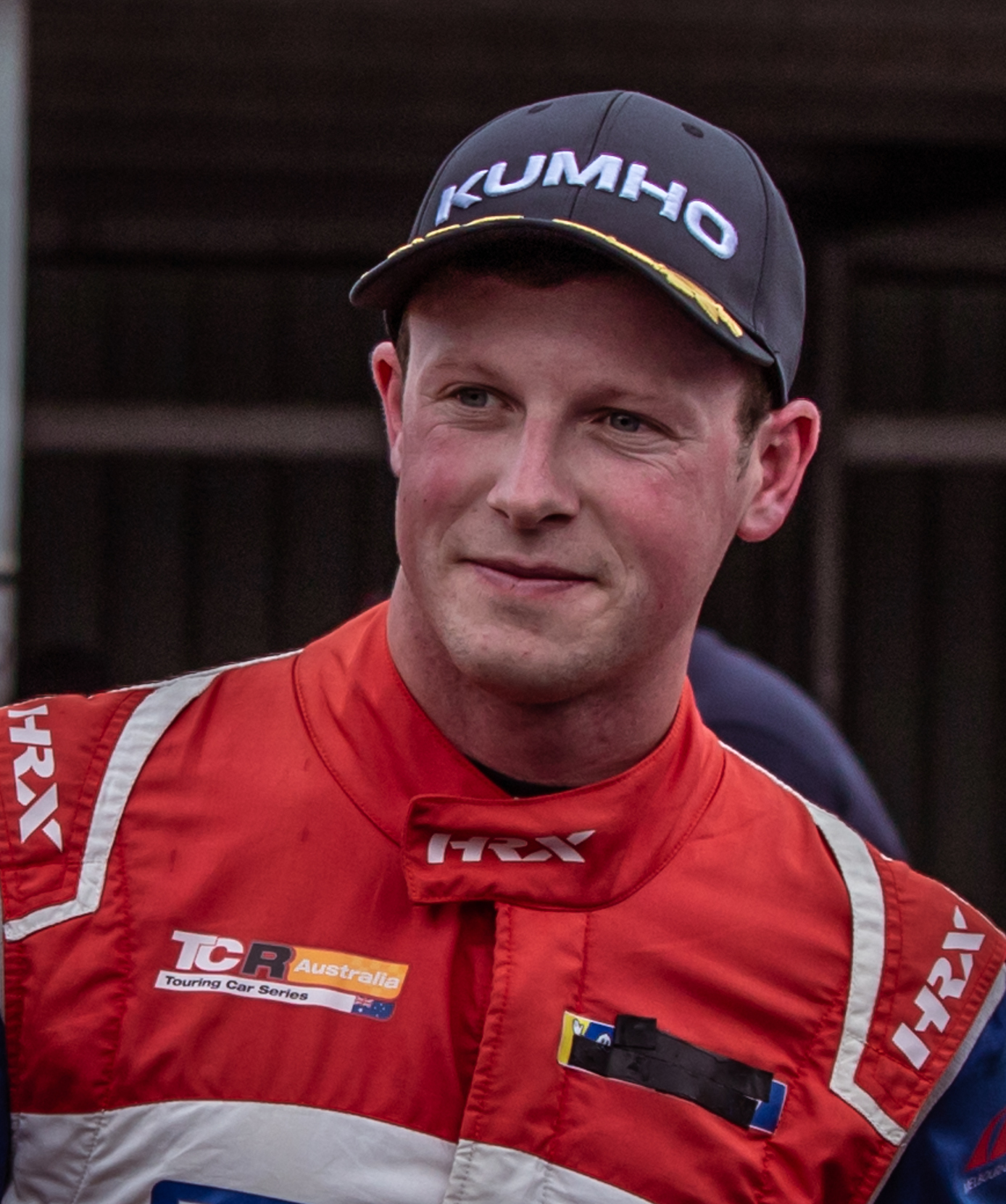
- Brown at Sydney Motorsport Park in 2023
- Nationality: (Australia) Australian
- Born: William Brown; 5 June 1998 (age 28) Toowoomba, Queensland, Australia
- Categorisation: FIA Silver (until 2023); FIA Gold (2024–2026); FIA Platinum (2027–)

Supercars Championship career
- Current team: Triple Eight Race Engineering
- Championships: 1 (2024)
- Races: 187
- Wins: 13
- Podiums: 49
- Pole positions: 9
- 2024 position: 1st (3060 pts)

NASCAR Cup Series career
- 2 races run over 2 years
- Car no., team: No. 13 (Kaulig Racing)
- 2025 position: 43rd
- Best finish: 42nd (2024)
- First race: 2024 Toyota/Save Mart 350 (Sonoma)
- Last race: 2025 Grant Park 165 (Chicago)
Wins	Top tens	Poles
0	0	0

NASCAR O'Reilly Auto Parts Series career
- 1 race run over 1 year
- 2025 position: 73rd
- Best finish: 73rd (2025)
- First race: 2025 Pacific Office Automation 147 (Portland)
Wins	Top tens	Poles
0	0	0

Previous series
- 2025; 2019, 2022–2023; 2017–2020; 2016; 2015–2016; 2015–2016: FR Oceania; TCR Australia; Super2; Australian Toyota 86; Formula 4 Australian; Australian Formula Ford

Championship titles
- 2025; 2024; 2019; 2016; 2016: New Zealand Grand Prix; Supercars Championship; TCR Australia; Australian Toyota 86; Australian Formula 4

Awards
- 2017 2017 2024-25: Mike Kable Young Gun Award; Peter Brock Medal; Larry Perkins Trophy

William Brown (born 5 June 1998) is an Australian professional racing driver. He competes in the Repco Supercars Championship with Triple Eight Race Engineering, driving the No. 888 Ford Mustang S650. He has previously competed in the NASCAR Cup Series and the NASCAR Xfinity Series. Brown won the 2024 Supercars Championship driving for Triple Eight Race Engineering.

With championship wins in both the Formula 4 Australian Championship and the Toyota Gazoo Racing Australia 86 Series in 2016, Brown became one of only five drivers in Australian motorsport history to achieve two national racing titles in one year. In 2017, he received the Mike Kable Young Gun Award and was awarded The Peter Brock Medal by the Confederation of Australian Motorsport (CAMS) for his outstanding year in racing.

== Junior racing career ==
=== Karting (2011–2014) ===
Brown started his career in karting in 2011 at the age of thirteen. He won numerous championships in his junior years and had an 80% win rate. He moved up the ranks and competed in the inaugural CAMS Jayco Australian Formula 4 Championship in 2015 with team BRM.

=== Formula 4 (2015–2016) ===
On the back of his karting form, Brown was signed by AGI Sport to race in the inaugural FIA Formula 4 Australia Championship and claimed victory in the first-ever race. Brown was a championship contender for the Formula 4 championship in 2015, winning three of the fifteen races that season. He finished third overall and was crowned Rookie of the Year after his impressive debut.

In 2016, Brown signed with BRM and recorded six race wins and twelve podiums from eighteen races to be crowned Formula 4 Australia Champion. He took the title with one round and one race remaining after a controversial race in Tasmania, where he was involved in a collision with rivals Nick Rowe and Jordan Love.

=== Formula Ford (2016) ===
Brown competed in the 2016 Australian Formula Ford Championship. Despite missing the first three rounds due to a date clash with Formula 4, Brown would go on to secure the runner-up spot in the 2016 championship, with multiple wins and podiums.

=== Toyota 86 Racing Series (2016) ===
Brown also competed in the one-make Australian Toyota 86 Racing Series in 2016, claiming the Series Title in a field of 39 drivers. With championship wins in both the Australian Formula 4 and the Australian Toyota Racing Series in 2016, Brown became one of only five drivers in Australian motorsport history to achieve two national racing titles in one year.

=== Super2 Series (2017–2020) ===
For the 2017 racing season, Brown was picked up by Eggleston Motorsport to replace the outgoing Liam McAdam. He scored a best finish of third at Symmons Plains and was on course to win the final race of the season in Newcastle before blowing a gearbox. He finished ninth in the championship overall.

=== 2020 Junior Driver Program ===
In 2020, Hyundai Motorsport named Brown in the 2020 Junior Driver Program as one of four drivers who would race Hyundai Motorsport TCR cars in some of the leading championships in the category. Outside of Europe, Brown represented the Customer Racing Junior Driver Program. Brown dominated the inaugural Australian TCR season with seven wins in his debut driving TCR cars. He remained with the HMO Customer Racing team to defend his title.

=== Formula Regional (2025) ===
Brown participated in the 2025 Formula Regional Oceania Championship for Giles Motorsport in the championship's first, second and fifth rounds. There he won the New Zealand Grand Prix.

== Supercars Championship career ==
=== Erebus Motorsport (2018–2023) ===
==== 2018 ====
Brown was named as a Supercars Endurance Cup co-driver, partnering Anton de Pasquale with Erebus Motorsport, where he immediately showed his elite driving ability throughout the three-race series. He continued to make solid progress in his Dunlop Super2 Series, landing sixth in the 2018 Driver's Championship with Eggleston Motorsport.

==== 2019 ====
Again partnering with de Pasquale at Erebus Motorsport in the Supercars championship, Brown's talent was on show, finishing second behind Craig Lowndes and ahead of Garth Tander in the Co-driver Race, taking his first podium in the series. Furthermore, Brown also accepted a drive in the inaugural S5000 series, competing alongside former F1 driver Rubens Barrichello.

==== 2020 ====
Brown began 2020 with a multi-year signing with Erebus Motorsport (Penrite Racing), which would see him compete in the Supercars series as a co-driver to David Reynolds in 2020, before becoming a full-time driver for the team from 2021. The Supercars Enduro Cup was reduced to a single race at Bathurst for 2020, where Brown and Reynolds finished fifteenth due to engine issues.

==== 2021 ====
Brown performed strongly in his first full-time Supercars season, achieving his first Supercars podium with second place in Race 22 at Sydney. He went on to score a maiden Armor All Pole Position the next weekend, starting on pole position for Race 23, again at Sydney Motorsport Park, but had to wait until Race 28 to claim his first Supercars race win. A stunning drive saw the Red Bull Australia drivers pressure Brown, but he held his nerve to become the 82nd driver to win an ATCC/Supercars race. He was the first rookie driver to win a Supercars race since 2013, when Scott McLaughlin and Chaz Mostert both took victories in their first full-time season.

==== 2022 ====
Brown had a mixed season in his second full-time Supercars season, only achieving a single podium at the first race at Sandown. He would also fail to start the last race at Pukekohe, after being involved in a major accident with Mark Winterbottom. He would finish fourteenth in the championship.

==== 2023 ====
Brown would improve massively in the first year in Gen3 machinery, compared to the previous year, with four wins and four pole positions. He would finish fifth in the standings.

=== Triple Eight Race Engineering (2024–present) ===
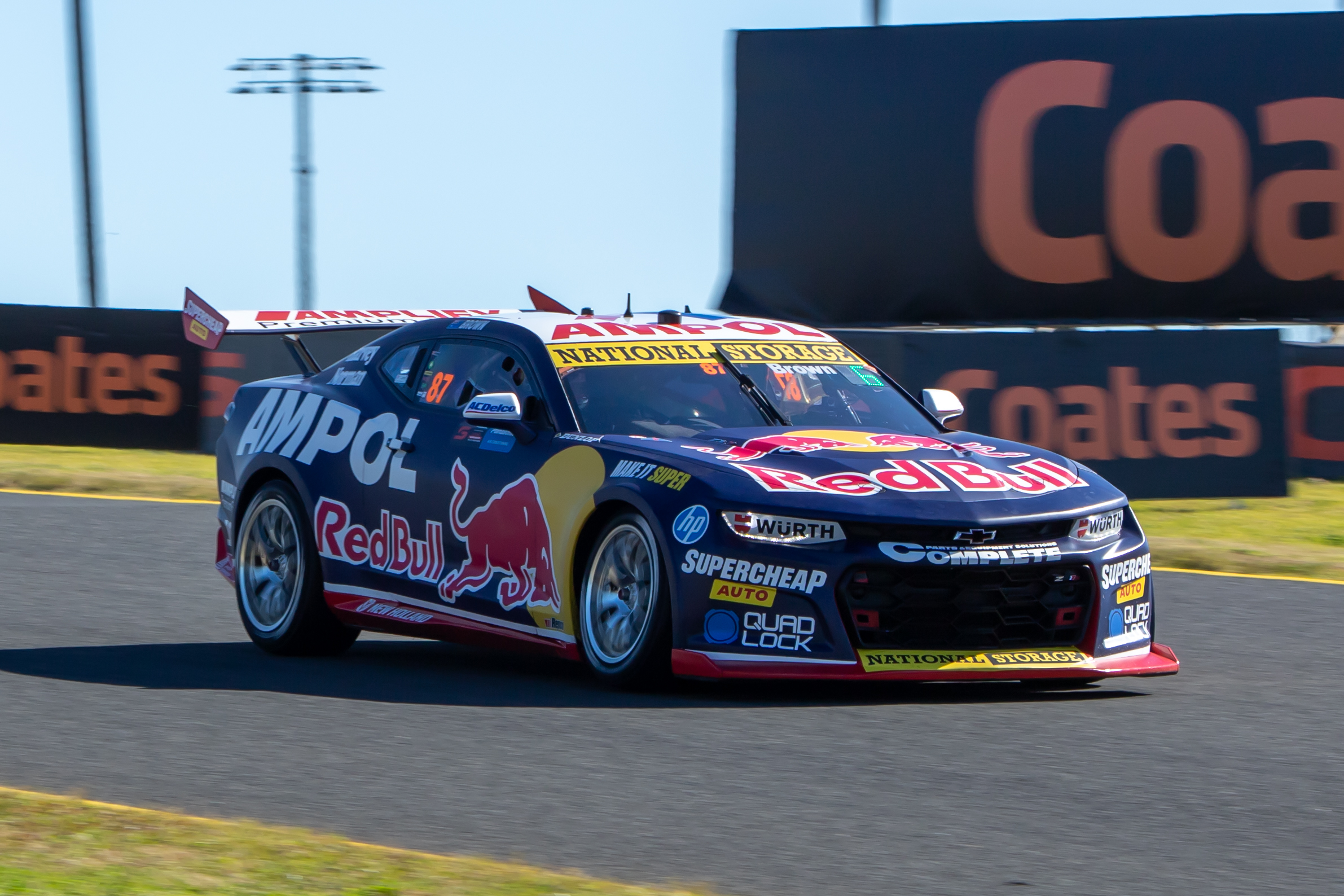
Brown won his first championship in 2024 after moving to Triple Eight Race Engineering.

==== 2024 ====
In August 2023, Brown announced his departure from Erebus to join Triple Eight Race Engineering, replacing the NASCAR bound Shane van Gisbergen. With Broc Feeney as his team-mate, he would endure his best year in the championship, with five wins across the season and a podium in every event, a feat not achieved since Dick Johnson in 1984, to secure his first title in the Supercars Championship.

== Other racing ==
=== TCR Series (2019–2025) ===
Brown drove in the TCR Australia Touring Car Series for its inaugural season. He was crowned champion with one round remaining. He also competed in the series for 2022 and 2023. He participated in all rounds for the former, coming second overall, whilst missing the third round in the latter, coming eleventh.

Brown also competed in the 2025 TCR World Tour for the series seventh round at the Zhuzhou International Circuit.

=== NASCAR (2024–2025) ===
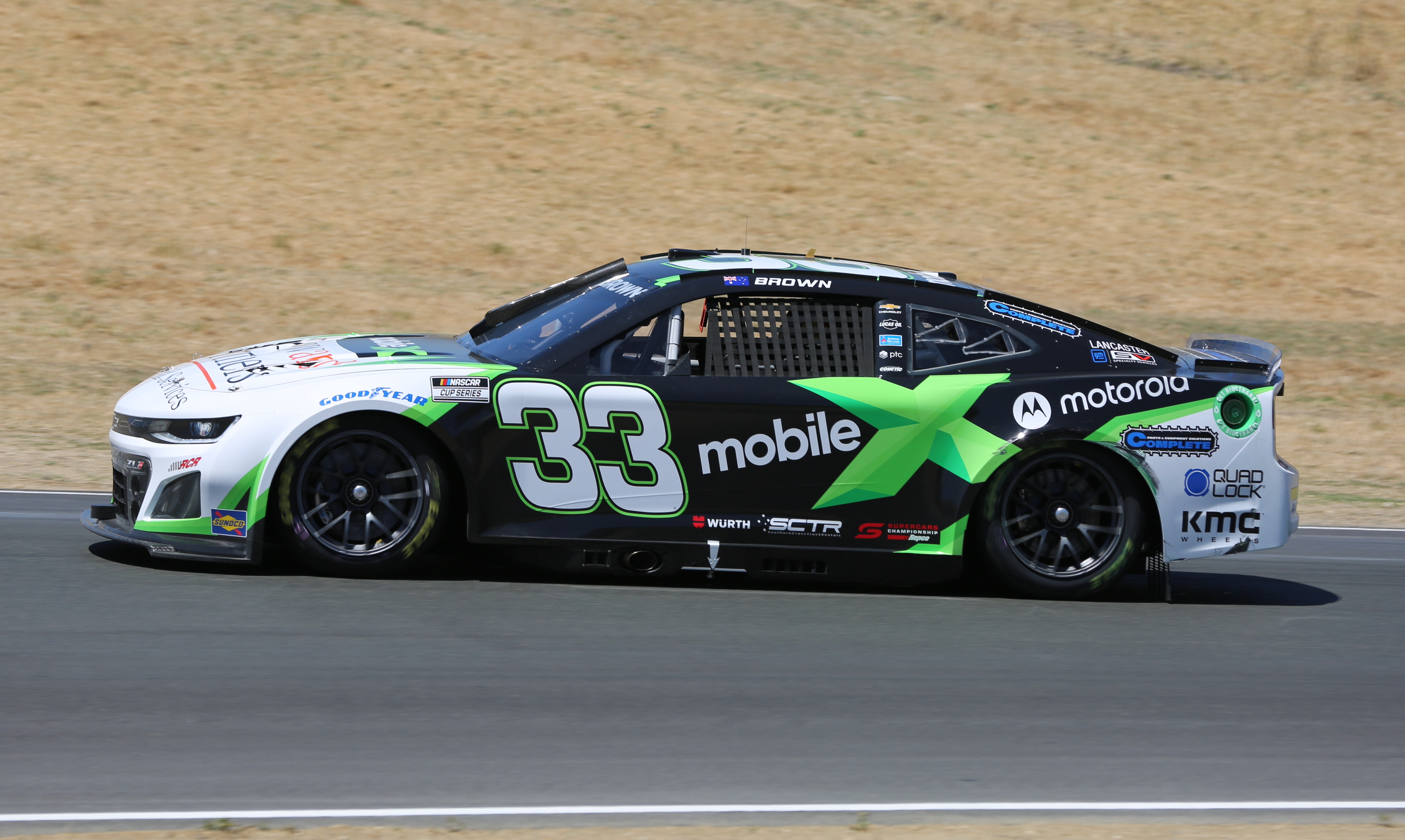
Brown made his NASCAR debut in the Cup Series at Sonoma Raceway in 2024.

On 15 May 2024, it was announced that Brown would make his NASCAR Cup Series debut at Sonoma Raceway, driving the No. 33 Chevrolet for Richard Childress Racing. Brown started 24th and was in the top-twenty at one point in the race before electrical issues relegated him to a 31st place finish, three laps down.

On 27 May 2025, it was announced that Brown would drive the No. 13 Chevrolet for Kaulig Racing at the Chicago Street Race on 6 July. On 7 August, it was announced that Brown would make his NASCAR Xfinity Series debut at Portland, driving the No. 11 Chevrolet for Kaulig Racing.

== Personal life ==
Alongside racing, Brown is a used car salesman for his father's business in Toowoomba. He also owns two planes and has a private pilot's licence.

== Career results ==
=== Karting career summary ===
Season	Series	Position
2012	Queensland Closed Karting Titles - KT100J	**1st**
2012	CIK Stars of Karting - KT100J	**1st**
2013	Australian National Sprint Kart Championship - Junior National Light	5th
2014	Australian National Sprint Kart Championship - Junior National Light	**2nd**
2014	Australian Junior Clubman Kart Championship	**3rd**

=== Career summary ===
Season	Series	Team	Races	Wins	Poles	F/Laps	Podiums	Points	Position
2015	Australian Formula 4 Championship	AGI Sport	21	1	1	1	7	216	**3rd**
2015	Australian Formula Ford Series	Race Academy	6	0	0	1	3	78	9th
2015	Victorian Formula Ford Championship	Race Academy	9	0	0	0	3	181	4th
2016	Australian Formula 4 Championship	Team BRM	17	6	4	4	13	316	**1st**
2016	Australian Formula Ford Series	BF Racing	15	9	2	5	12	255	**2nd**
2016	Australian Toyota 86 Racing Series	Will Brown Motorsport	14	7	1	4	10	1278	**1st**
2016	Mazda Road to Indy Shootout	Lucas Oil School of Racing	1	0	0	0	0	N/A	6th
2017	Super2 Series	Eggleston Motorsport	21	0	0	0	1	1078	9th
2017	Australian Toyota 86 Racing Series	Neale Motorsport	3	0	0	1	1	158	17th
2017	Australian Production Car Series		7	1	0	1	1	80	17th
2018	Super2 Series	Eggleston Motorsport	15	0	0	0	2	1068	6th
2018	Supercars Championship	Erebus Motorsport	3	0	0	0	0	204	49th
2018	Australian Production Car Series	Griffith Corporation	4	0	0	0	0	8	52nd
2019	Super2 Series	Eggleston Motorsport	14	1	0	1	2	960	12th
2019	Australian S5000 Exhibition	Eggleston Motorsport	6	0	0	0	1	N/A	N/A
2019	TCR Australia Touring Car Series	HMO Customer Racing	21	7	1	9	15	743	**1st**
2019	Supercars Championship	Erebus Motorsport	5	0	0	0	1	338	41st
2020	Super2 Series	Image Racing	7	2	2	0	6	813	**2nd**
2020	Supercars Championship	Erebus Motorsport	1	0	0	0	0	120	40th
2021	Supercars Championship	Erebus Motorsport	30	1	1	2	3	1838	8th
2022	Supercars Championship	Erebus Motorsport	33	0	0	1	1	1714	14th
2022	TCR Australia Touring Car Series	MPC - Audi Liqui Moly Racing Team	20	2	0	3	6	702	**2nd**
2022	Intercontinental GT Challenge	Nineteen Corporation Racing Team	1	0	0	0	0	0	NC
2023	Supercars Championship	Erebus Motorsport	28	4	4	1	9	2264	5th
2023	TCR Australia Touring Car Series	MPC - Audi Liqui Moly Racing Team	14	4	2	6	7	442	11th
2023	TCR World Tour	MPC - Audi Liqui Moly Racing Team	5	2	0	0	3	95	10th
2024	Supercars Championship	Triple Eight Race Engineering	24	5	2	6	19	3060	**1st**
2024	NASCAR Cup Series	Richard Childress Racing	1	0	0	0	0	6	42nd
2024	GT World Challenge Australia - Pro-Am	Melbourne Performance Centre	10	3	2	2	5	143	**2nd**
2025	Formula Regional Oceania Championship	Giles Motorsport	9	1	0	1	3	158	10th
2025	Tasman Series	Giles Motorsport	6	0	0	1	2	109	**2nd**
2025	Supercars Championship	Triple Eight Race Engineering	33	2	1	4	12	5244	**2nd**
2025	NASCAR Cup Series	Kaulig Racing	1	0	0	0	0	1	43rd
2025	NASCAR Xfinity Series	Kaulig Racing	1	0	0	0	0	2	73rd
2025	TCR World Tour	HMO Customer Racing	3	0	0	0	0	62	12th
2025	Race of Champions – Nations Cup	RoC	9	6	-	-	-	-	**2nd**
2026	Supercars Championship	Triple Eight Race Engineering	30	1	2	2	6	3103*	**3rd***
2026	Supercars Enduro Cup	Triple Eight Race Engineering	2	0	0	1	1	510	**1st**

* Season still in progress.

=== Complete Australian Formula 4 Championship results ===
(key) (Races in bold indicate pole position) (Races in italics indicate fastest lap)

Year	Team	1	2	3	4	5	6	7	8	9	10	11	12	13	14	15	16	17	18	19	20	21	DC	Points
2015	AGI Sport	TOW; 1; 1	TOW; 2; 4	**TOW**; **3**; 8	QLD; 1 Ret	QLD; 2; 8	QLD; 3; 4	SMP; 1; 8	SMP; 2; 3	SMP; 3; 3	SAN; 1; 8	SAN; 2 Ret	SAN; 3; 5	SUR; 1; 7	SUR; 2; 5	SUR; 3; 4	PHI; 1; 2	PHI; 2; 3	PHI; 3; 6	SYD; 1; 2	SYD; 2; 6	SYD; 3; 3	3rd	216
2016	Team BRM	**SYM**; **1**; 2	SYM; 2; 3	**SYM**; **3**; 2	PHI; 1; 3	PHI; 2; 1	PHI; 3; 2	SMP; 1; 4	SMP; 2; 1	SMP; 3; 5	QLD; 1; 4	QLD; 2; 1	QLD; 3; 2	SAN; 1; 1	SAN; 2 EX	SAN; 3; 1	**SUR**; **1**; 1	SUR; 2; 4	**SUR**; **3**; 2				1st	316

=== Complete Super2 Series results ===
(key) (Round results only), (2020 Race results only)

Super2 Series results
Year	Team	No.	Car	1	2	3	4	5	6	7	8	9	10	11	12	13	14	15	16	17	18	19	20	21	Position	Points
2017	Eggleston Motorsport	38	Holden VF Commodore	ADE; R1; 10	ADE; R2; 6	ADE; R3; 6	SYM; R4; 3	SYM; R5; 5	SYM; R6; 8	SYM; R7; 20	PHI; R8; 7	PHI; R9; 6	PHI; R10; 6	PHI; R11; 6	TOW; R12; 10	TOW; R13; Ret	SMP; R14; 12	SMP; R15; 13	SMP; R16; 9	SMP; R17; 6	SAN; R18; 5	SAN; R19; 11	NEW; R20; 6	NEW; R21; Ret	9th	1078
2018	Eggleston Motorsport	38	Holden VF Commodore	ADE; R1; 5	ADE; R2; 6	ADE; R3; 3	SYM; R4; 9	SYM; R5; 8	SYM; R6; 7	BAR; R7; 18	BAR; R8; 20	BAR; R9; 13	TOW; R10; 14	TOW; R11; 7	SAN; R12; 17	SAN; R13; 10	BAT; R14; 13	NEW; R15; 3	NEW; R16; C						6th	1068
2019	Eggleston Motorsport	38	Holden VF Commodore	ADE; R1; Ret	ADE; R2; 10	ADE; R3; 5	BAR; R4; 1	BAR; R5; 8	TOW; R6; Ret	TOW; R7; 9	QLD; R8; 6	QLD; R9; 16	BAT; R10; Ret	SAN; R11; 4	SAN; R12; 3	NEW; R13; 6	NEW; R14; Ret								12th	960
2020	Image Racing	999	Holden VF Commodore	ADE; R1; 3	ADE; R2; 3	ADE; R3; 2	SYD; R4; 1	SYD; R5; 4	**BAT**; **R6**; **1**	**BAT**; **R7**; **3**															2nd	813

=== Supercars Championship results ===
Supercars results
Year	Team	Car	1	2	3	4	5	6	7	8	9	10	11	12	13	14	15	16	17	18	19	20	21	22	23	24	25	26	27	28	29	30	31	32	34	35	36	37	38	Position	Points
2018	Erebus Motorsport	Holden ZB Commodore	ADE; R1	ADE; R2	MEL; R3	MEL; R4	MEL; R5	MEL; R6	SYM; R7	SYM; R8	PHI; R9	PHI; R10	BAR; R11	BAR; R12	WIN; R13; PO	WIN; R14; PO	HID; R15	HID; R16	TOW; R17	TOW; R18	QLD; R19; PO	QLD; R20; PO	SMP; R21	BEN; R22	BEN; R23	SAN; QR; 12	SAN; R24; 12	BAT; R25; 24	SUR; R26; Ret	SUR; R27; C	PUK; R28	PUK; R29	NEW; R30	NEW; R31						49th	204
2019	Erebus Motorsport	Holden ZB Commodore	ADE; R1	ADE; R2	MEL; R3	MEL; R4	MEL; R5	MEL; R6	SYM; R7; PO	SYM; R8; PO	PHI; R9	PHI; R10	BAR; R11	BAR; R12	WIN; R13	WIN; R14	HID; R15	HID; R16	TOW; R17	TOW; R18	QLD; R19	QLD; R20	BEN; R21; PO	BEN; R22; PO	PUK; R23	PUK; R24	BAT; R25; Ret	SUR; R26; 11	SUR; R27; 8	SAN; QR; 2	SAN; R28; 10	NEW; R29	NEW; R30							41st	338
2020	Erebus Motorsport	Holden ZB Commodore	ADE; R1	ADE; R2	MEL; R3	MEL; R4	MEL; R5	MEL; R6	SMP1; R7	SMP1; R8	SMP1; R9	SMP2; R10	SMP2; R11	SMP2; R12	HID1; R13	HID1; R14	HID1; R15	HID2; R16	HID2; R17	HID2; R18	TOW1; R19	TOW1; R20	TOW1; R21	TOW2; R22	TOW2; R23	TOW2; R24	BEN1; R25	BEN1; R26	BEN1; R27	BEN2; R28	BEN2; R29	BEN2; R30	BAT; R31; 15							40th	120
2021	Erebus Motorsport	Holden ZB Commodore	BAT1; R1; 16	BAT1; R2; 14	SAN; R3; 16	SAN; R4; 16	SAN; R5; 7	SYM; R6; 9	SYM; R7; 5	SYM; R8; 15	BEN; R9; 11	BEN; R10; 13	BEN; R11; 24	HID; R12; 4	HID; R13; 8	HID; R14; 10	TOW1; R15; 18	TOW1; R16; 5	TOW2; R17; 10	TOW2; R18; Ret	TOW2; R19; 12	SMP1; R20; 5	SMP1; R21; 11	SMP1; R22; 2	**SMP2**; **R23**; **11**	SMP2; R24; 6	SMP2; R25; 6	SMP3; R26; 3	SMP3; R27; 8	SMP3; R28; 1	SMP4; R29; 7	SMP4; R30; C	BAT2; R31; 20							8th	1838
2022	Erebus Motorsport	Holden ZB Commodore	SMP; R1; 7	SMP; R2; 8	SYM; R3; 13	SYM; R4; 12	SYM; R5; 15	MEL; R6; 17	MEL; R7; 23	MEL; R8; 24	MEL; R9; 8	BAR; R10; 17	BAR; R11; Ret	BAR; R12; 5	WIN; R13; 27	WIN; R14; 6	WIN; R15; 5	HID; R16; Ret	HID; R17; 20	HID; R18; 7	TOW; R19; 11	TOW; R20; 19	BEN; R21; 20	BEN; R22; 7	BEN; R23; 6	SAN; R24; 4	SAN; R25; 3	SAN; R26; 11	PUK; R27; 19	PUK; R28; Ret	PUK; R29; DNS	BAT; R30; 10	SUR; R31; 24	SUR; R32; 11	ADE; R33; 22	ADE; R34; 6				14th	1714
2023	Erebus Motorsport	Chevrolet Camaro ZL1	NEW; R1; 4	NEW; R2; 13	MEL; R3; 3	MEL; R4; 6	MEL; R5; 3	MEL; R6; 23	BAR; R7; 16	**BAR**; **R8**; **1**	BAR; R9; 2	**SYM**; **R10**; **1**	SYM; R11; 3	SYM; R12; 1	HID; R13; 7	HID; R14; 5	HID; R15; 6	**TOW**; **R16**; **1**	TOW; R17; 6	SMP; R18; 3	SMP; R19; 14	BEN; R20; Ret	BEN; R21; 13	BEN; R22; 13	**SAN**; **R23**; **4**	BAT; R24; 8	SUR; R25; 11	SUR; R26; 11	ADE; R27; Ret	ADE; R28; 14										5th	2264
2024	Triple Eight Race Engineering	Chevrolet Camaro ZL1	**BAT1**; **R1**; **2**	BAT1; R2; 1	MEL; R3; 2	MEL; R4; 1	MEL; R5; 2	MEL; R6; 2	TAU; R7; 9	TAU; R8; 1	BAR; R9; 2	BAR; R10; 3	HID; R11; 3	HID; R12; 2	TOW; R13; 3	TOW; R14; 24	SMP; R15; 6	SMP; R16; 3	SYM; R17; 7	SYM; R18; 2	SAN; R19; 1	BAT2; R20; 3	SUR; R21; 7	SUR; R22; 2	ADE; R23; 2	ADE; R24; 1														1st	3060
2025	Triple Eight Race Engineering	Chevrolet Camaro ZL1	SMP; R1; 5	SMP; R2; 3	SMP; R3; 2	MEL; R4; 2	MEL; R5; 3	MEL; R6; 1	MEL; R7; C	TAU; R8; 5	TAU; R9; 7	TAU; R10; 8	SYM; R11; 5	SYM; R12; 11	**SYM**; **R13**; **3**	BAR; R14; 2	BAR; R15; 2	BAR; R16; 5	HID; R17; 8	HID; R18; 7	HID; R19; 5	TOW; R20; 10	TOW; R21; 4	TOW; R22; 2	QLD; R23; 4	QLD; R24; 1	QLD; R25; 23	BEN; R26; 4	BAT; R27; 17	SUR; R28; 5	SUR; R29; 8	SAN; R30; 2	SAN; R31; 3	ADE; R32; 9	ADE; R33; 4	ADE; R34; 3				2nd	5244
2026	Triple Eight Race Engineering	Ford Mustang S650	SMP; R1; 7	SMP; R2; 14	SMP; R3; 18	MEL; R4; 8	MEL; R5; 21	MEL; R6; 21	**MEL**; **R7**; **2**	TAU; R8; 2	TAU; R9; 4	CHR; R10; 17	CHR; R11; 4	CHR; R12; 13	CHR; R13; 6	SYM; R14; 9	SYM; R15; 4	SYM; R16; 5	HID; R20; 5	HID; R21; 5	HID; R22; 4	TOW; R23; 7	TOW; R24; 6	TOW; R25; 8	BAR; R17; 12	BAR; R18; 5	BAR; R19; 17	QLD; R26; 3	QLD; R27; 1	**QLD**; **R28**; **3**	BEN; R28; 4	BAT; R30; 2	SUR; R31	SUR; R32	SAN; R33	SAN; R34	ADE; R35	ADE; R36	ADE; R37	3rd*	3103*

=== Bathurst 1000 results ===
Year	Team	Car	Co-driver	Position	Laps
2018	Erebus Motorsport	Holden Commodore ZB	(Australia) Anton de Pasquale	24th	143
2019	Erebus Motorsport	Holden Commodore ZB	(Australia) Anton de Pasquale	DNF	125
2020	Erebus Motorsport	Holden Commodore ZB	(Australia) David Reynolds	15th	160
2021	Erebus Motorsport	Holden Commodore ZB	(Australia) Jack Perkins	20th	150
2022	Erebus Motorsport	Holden Commodore ZB	(Australia) Jack Perkins	10th	161
2023	Erebus Motorsport	Chevrolet Camaro Mk.6	(Australia) Jack Perkins	8th	161
2024	Triple Eight Race Engineering	Chevrolet Camaro Mk.6	(Australia) Scott Pye	**3rd**	161
2025	Triple Eight Race Engineering	Chevrolet Camaro Mk.6	(Australia) Scott Pye	17th	159
2026	Triple Eight Race Engineering	Ford Mustang S650	(Australia) Scott Pye	**2nd**	161

=== Complete Bathurst 12 Hour results ===
Year	Team	Co-drivers	Car	Class	Laps	Pos.	Class pos.
2017	MARC Cars Australia	(Papua New Guinea) Keith Kassulke (Australia) Rod Salmon	MARC II V8 - Ford V8	Invitational	270	17th	**1st**
2018	MARC Cars Australia	(Papua New Guinea) Keith Kassulke (Australia) Rod Salmon	MARC II V8 - Ford V8	Invitational	258	18th	**1st**
2022	(Australia) Nineteen Corporation	(Australia) Jack Perkins (Australia) Mark Griffith	Mercedes-AMG GT3 Evo	A–GT3 Pro-Am	33	DNF	
2024	(Australia) Triple Eight Race Engineering	(Australia) Broc Feeney (Canada) Mikaël Grenier	Mercedes-AMG GT3 Evo	Pro	275	6th	6th
2025	(Australia) Arise Racing GT	(Australia) Chaz Mostert (Brazil) Daniel Serra	Ferrari 296 GT3	A	306	4th	4th
2026	(Australia) Jamec Racing Team MPC	(Germany) Christopher Haase (Australia) Brad Schumacher	Audi R8 LMS Evo II	A	262	4th	**3rd**

=== Complete S5000 results ===
Year	Series	Team	1	2	3	4	5	6	Position	Points
2019	Exhibition	Eggleston Motorsport	SAN; R1; 5	SAN; R2; 6	SAN; M 4	BMP; R1; 5	BMP; R2; 4	BMP; M 3	N/C	—

=== TCR Australia results ===
TCR Australia results
Year	Team	Car	1	2	3	4	5	6	7	8	9	10	11	12	13	14	15	16	17	18	19	20	21	Position	Points
2019	HMO Customer Racing	Hyundai i30 N TCR	SMP; R1; 3	SMP; R2; 1	SMP; R3; 1	PHI; R4; 2	PHI; R5; 2	PHI; R6; 1	BEN; R7; 2	BEN; R8; 1	BEN; R9; 5	QLD; R10; 16	QLD; R11; 10	QLD; R12; 8	**WIN**; **R13**; 2	WIN; R14; 1	WIN; R15; 1	SAN; R16; 2	SAN; R17; 7	SAN; R18; 7	BEN; R19; 1	BEN; R20; 2	BEN; R21; 3	1st	743
2022	Melbourne Performance Centre	Audi RS 3 LMS TCR (2017)	SYM; R1; 7	SYM; R2; 4	SYM; R3; 13	PHI; R4; 18	PHI; R5; 7	PHI; R6; 2	BAT; R7; 4	BAT; R8; 10	BAT; R9; 7	SMP; R10; Ret	SMP; R11; 10	SMP; R12; 6	QLD; R13; 8	QLD; R14; 2	QLD; R15; 4	SAN; R16; 2	SAN; R17; 3	SAN; R18; 1	BAT; R19; 6	BAT; R20; C	BAT; R21; 1	2nd	677
2023	Melbourne Performance Centre	Audi RS 3 LMS TCR (2021)	**SYM**; **R1**; DNS	SYM; R2; Ret	SYM; R3; DNS	PHI; R4; Ret	PHI; R5; 11	PHI; R6; 8	WIN; R7	WIN; R8	WIN; R9	**QLD**; **R13**; 1	QLD; R14; 3	QLD; R15; 1	SAN; R16; 2	SAN; R17; Ret	SAN; R18; DNS	SMP; R19; 1	SMP; R20; 1	SMP; R21; 3	BAT; R16; 13	BAT; R17; Ret	BAT; R18; DNS	11th	442

=== TCR World Tour results ===
Year	Team	Car	1	2	3	4	5	6	7	8	9	10	11	12	13	14	15	16	17	18	19	20	21	Position	Points
2023	Melbourne Performance Centre	Audi RS 3 LMS TCR (2021)	ALG; R1	ALG; R2	SPA; R3	SPA; R4	VAL; R5	VAL; R6	HUN; R7	HUN; R8	VBF; R9	VBF; R10	JCB; R11	JCB; R12	SMP; R13; 1	SMP; R14; 1	SMP; R15; 3	BAT; R16; 13	BAT; R17; Ret	BAT; R18; DNS	MAC; R19	MAC; R20		10th	95
2025	HMO Customer Racing	Hyundai Elantra N TCR	AHR; 1	AHR; 2	AHR; 3	CRT; 1	CRT; 2	CRT; 3	MNZ; 1	MNZ; 2	CVR; 1	CVR; 2	BEN; 1	BEN; 2	BEN; 3	INJ; 1	INJ; 2	INJ; 3	ZHZ; 1; 4	ZHZ; 2; 7	ZHZ; 3; 4	MAC; 1	MAC; 2	12th	64

=== Australian GT Championship results ===
(Races in bold indicate pole position) (Races in italics indicate fastest lap)

Australian GT Championship results
Year	Team	Car	1	2	3	4	5	6	7	8	9	10	11	12	Position	Points
2024	Melbourne Performance Centre	Audi R8 LMS Evo II	PHI; R1; 3	PHI; R2; 3	**BEN**; **R3**; **4**	BEN; R4; 1	**QLD**; **R5**; **Ret**	QLD; R6; 1	PHI; R7; 5	PHI; R8; 8	SMP; R9; DNS	SMP; R10; DNS	BAT; R11; 1	BAT; R12; 6	2nd	143

=== Complete Formula Regional Oceania Championship results ===
(key) (Races in bold indicate pole position) (Races in italics indicate fastest lap)

Year	Team	1	2	3	4	5	6	7	8	9	10	11	12	13	14	15	DC	Points
2025	Giles Motorsport	TAU; 1; 2	TAU; 2; 9	TAU; 3; 8	HMP; 1; 3	HMP; 2; 5	HMP; 3; 8	MAN; 1	MAN; 2	MAN; 3	TER; 1	TER; 2	TER; 3	HIG; 1; 11	HIG; 2; 12	HIG; 3; 1	10th	158

==== Complete New Zealand Grand Prix results ====
Year	Team	Car	Qualifying	Main race
2025	(New Zealand) Giles Motorsport	Tatuus FT-60 - Toyota	**2nd**	**1st**

=== NASCAR ===
(key) (Bold – Pole position awarded by qualifying time. Italics – Pole position earned by points standings or practice time. * – Most laps led.)

==== Cup Series ====
NASCAR Cup Series results
Year	Team	No.	Make	1	2	3	4	5	6	7	8	9	10	11	12	13	14	15	16	17	18	19	20	21	22	23	24	25	26	27	28	29	30	31	32	33	34	35	36	NCSC	Pts	Ref
2024	Richard Childress Racing	33	Chevy	DAY	ATL	LVS	PHO	BRI	COA	RCH	MAR	TEX	TAL	DOV	KAN	DAR	CLT	GTW	SON; 31	IOW	NHA	NSH	CSC	POC	IND	RCH	MCH	DAY	DAR	ATL	GLN	BRI	KAN	TAL	ROV	LVS	HOM	MAR	PHO	42nd	6	
2025	Kaulig Racing	13	Chevy	DAY	ATL	COA	PHO	LVS	HOM	MAR	DAR	BRI	TAL	TEX	KAN	CLT	NSH	MCH	MXC	POC	ATL	CSC; 39	SON	DOV	IND	IOW	GLN	RCH	DAY	DAR	GTW	BRI	NHA	KAN	ROV	LVS	TAL	MAR	PHO	43rd	1	

==== Xfinity Series ====
NASCAR Xfinity Series results
Year	Team	No.	Make	1	2	3	4	5	6	7	8	9	10	11	12	13	14	15	16	17	18	19	20	21	22	23	24	25	26	27	28	29	30	31	32	33	NXSC	Pts	Ref
2025	Kaulig Racing	11	Chevy	DAY	ATL	COA	PHO	LVS	HOM	MAR	DAR	BRI	CAR	TAL	TEX	CLT	NSH	MXC	POC	ATL	CSC	SON	DOV	IND	IOW	GLN	DAY	PIR; 35	GTW	BRI	KAN	ROV	LVS	TAL	MAR	PHO	73rd	2	

^{*} Season still in progress
^{1} Ineligible for series points

Sporting positions
Preceded by Jordan Lloyd	Winner of the Australian Formula 4 Championship; 2016	Succeeded by Nicholas Rowe
Preceded by Inaugural	Winner of the Australian Toyota 86 Racing Series; 2016	Succeeded by Jimmy Vernon
Preceded by Inaugural	Winner of the TCR Australia Touring Car Series; 2019	Succeeded by Chaz Mostert
Preceded by Brodie Kostecki	Winner of the Supercars Championship; 2024	Succeeded by Incumbent
Preceded by Liam Sceats	Winner of the New Zealand Grand Prix; 2025	Succeeded by Incumbent
Awards and achievements
Preceded by Cam Waters	Mike Kable Young Gun Award; 2017	Succeeded by Thomas Randle
Preceded by Mark Webber	Peter Brock Medal; 2017	Succeeded by Anton De Pasquale
Preceded by Brodie Kostecki	Larry Perkins Trophy; 2024-25	Succeeded by Brodie Kostecki
