= Mike Kable Young Gun Award =

Touring car award

- Sport: Touring car racing
- Competition: Supercars Championship; Super2 Series; Super3 Series
- Awarded for: Best performing rookie over the course of the Supercars, Super2 or Super3 season
- Location: Sydney, New South Wales, Australia

History
- First winner: Matthew White (2000)
- Most recent: Cameron McLeod (2023)

The Mike Kable Young Gun Award (also called the Mike Kable Rookie of the Year) is an annual motor racing award honouring the achievements of a rookie driver under the age of 30 who competes in either the Supercars Championship, the second-tier Super2 Series or the third-tier Super3 Series. (Note: The second-tier championship has variously been sponsored by Konica, Holden Performance Driving Centre (HPDC), Fujitsu and Dunlop.) Tony Cochrane, the chairman of the championship's organising body Australian Vee Eight Supercar Company (AVESCO), (Note: AVESCO's name was changed to V8 Supercars Australia in 2005.) instigated the accolade in June 2000. It is named after Mike Kable, an Australian motoring journalist, motorsport publicist, and mentor to young racing drivers. The award is presented to the rookie driver adjudged to have performed the best over the course of their first season in either championship following a vote by a panel of motorsport experts. The recipient receives a sponsorship grant of A$15,000 to help develop themselves. The winner is announced at the series' end-of-season gala in Sydney.

The inaugural winner was Matthew White in 2000. The following year, the Stone Brothers Racing driver Marcos Ambrose won the award. Ambrose, James Courtney, Rick Kelly, Scott McLaughlin and Mark Winterbottom are the five recipients who have gone on to win either the Supercars Championship and/or the Bathurst 1000 in their careers. Australian drivers have won 21 times and New Zealanders twice. No one has won more than once; drivers from the second-tier championship have been honoured 14 times and Supercars competitors have won on 7 occasions. The 2023 recipient was Cameron McLeod, who finished in third place in the Super3 Series drivers' standings.

== Winners ==
Mike Kable Young Gun Award winners
Year	Image	Winner	Nationality	Series	Ref.
2000		Matthew White	Australian	Konica V8 Lites Series	
2001	A man in his early thirties wearing black rectangular sunglasses and racing overalls with sponsors logos. He is smiling at the camera	Marcos Ambrose	Australian	V8 Supercars	
2002	A clean shaven man in his late thirties wearing a green, black and red zip T-shirt with sponsors logos	Rick Kelly	Australian	V8 Supercars	
2003	A man in his mid-30 smiling away from the camera. He is wearing a white fireproof vest with sponsors logos.	Mark Winterbottom	Australian	Konica V8 Supercar Series	
2004		Warren Luff	Australian	V8 Supercars	
2005	A clean shaven man in his mid-thirties wearing an unbuttoned shirt looking to the left of the camera	Grant Denyer	Australian	HPDC V8 Supercar Series	
2006	A man in his early twenties standing in a pit lane and smiling at the camera. He is holding a crash helmet in a yellow, dark green and white colour scheme in his right arm.	James Courtney	Australian	V8 Supercars	
2007	A man in his early thirties wearing black rectangular sunglasses and a black T-shirt	Dale Wood	Australian	Fujitsu V8 Supercar Series	
2008	A man in his mid-twenties wearing a white fireproof vest and has one earphone in his right ear which his right hand is clutch over	Karl Reindler	Australian	Fujitsu V8 Supercar Series	
2009	A man in his late twenties wearing a white T-shirt with a red collar and he has retangular sunglasses on the top of the hair on his head	James Moffat	Australian	Fujitsu V8 Supercar Series	
2010	A man in his late twenties wearing a black T-shirt with sponsors logos and a blue and white baseball cap on his head. He is looking to the right and is holding a black pen in his right hand	Tim Blanchard	Australian	Fujitsu V8 Supercar Series	
2011	A man in his late twenties wearing a baseball cap the opposite way and a blue and white T-shirt. He is holding a black microphone in his right hand and is speaking to the press	Chaz Mostert	Australian	Fujitsu V8 Supercar Series	
2012	A man in his early twenties looking to someone outside the camera. He is wearing a black T-shirt with sponsors logos and his holding both his hands together/	Scott Pye	Australian	Dunlop V8 Supercar Series	
2013	A teenaged man wearing red racing overalls with sponsors logos is smiling at the camera	Scott McLaughlin	New Zealander	V8 Supercars	
2014	A man in his early twenties wearing a white fireproof balaclava around most of his head and dark red, blue and white racing overalls. He is putting on his helmet and HANS device.	Todd Hazelwood	Australian	Dunlop V8 Supercar Series	
2015		Ashley Walsh	Australian	V8 Supercars	
2016	A man in his early twenties wearing a black baseball on the opposite way and T-shirt with sponsors logos.	Cameron Waters	Australian	V8 Supercars	
2017		Will Brown	Australian	Super2 Series	
2018		Thomas Randle	Australian	Super2 Series	
2019	A teenaged man wearing a mustard hoodie standing next to a red and white racing car numbered 7 to the right of the picture	Tyler Everingham	Australian	Super2 Series	
2020	Not awarded				
2021	A male in his mid-20s in racing overalls sporting long hair with a yellow sponsored baseball cap on his head celebrating with a bottle of champagne in his right hand	Matt McLean	Australian	Super2 Series	
2022		Matthew Payne	New Zealander	Super2 Series	
2023	—	Cameron McLeod	Australian	Super3 Series	
2024		Aaron Cameron	Australian	Super2 Series	

== Statistics ==
Winners by nationality
Country	Winners
Australian	23
New Zealander	2

Winners by series
Series	Winners
Super2 Series	15
V8 Supercars	7
Super3 Series	1

== See also ==
- Barry Sheene Medal
