= Chaz Mostert =

Australian racing driver (born 1992)

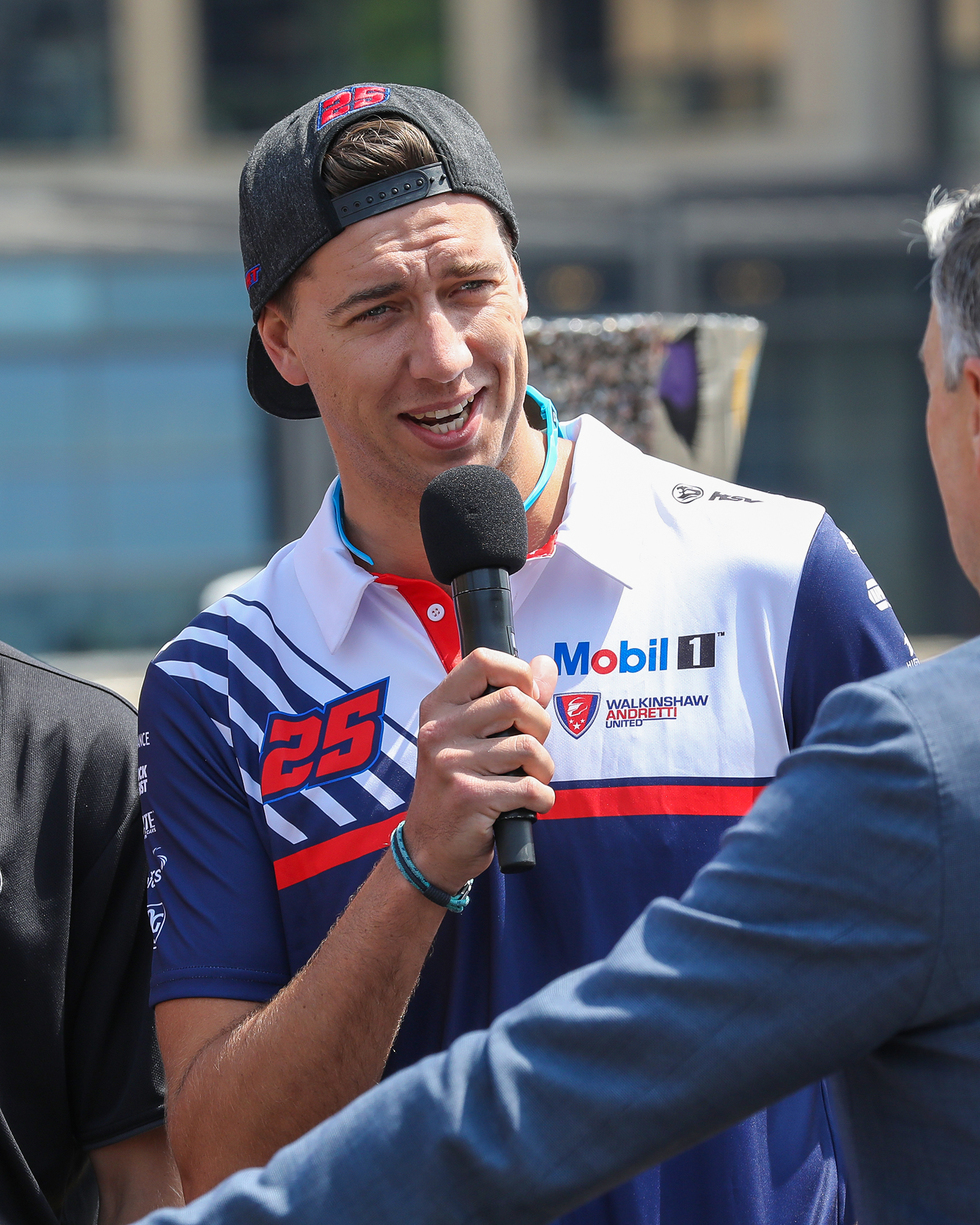
- Mostert in 2020
- Nationality: (Australia) Australian
- Born: Chaz Michael Mostert; 10 April 1992 (age 34) Melbourne, Victoria, Australia
- Categorisation: FIA Gold (until 2023); FIA Platinum (2024–)

Supercars Championship career
- Current team: Walkinshaw TWG Racing
- Championships: 1 (2025)
- Races: 409
- Wins: 31
- Podiums: 115
- Pole positions: 27
- 2025 position: 1st (5306 pts)

Previous series
- 2021, 2024; 2021; 2017–18; 2010–2013; 2008–2010: GT World Challenge Australia; TCR Australia Touring Car Series; Asian Le Mans Series; Dunlop V8 Supercar Series; Australian Formula Ford

Championship titles
- 2025; 2024; 2021; 2010: Supercars Championship; GT World Challenge Australia; TCR Australia Touring Car Series; Australian Formula Ford

Awards
- 2023–2024; 2019; 2018 & 22; 2011: Barry Sheene Medal; Larry Perkins Trophy; Allan Simonsen Trophy; Mike Kable Young Gun Award

Chaz Michael Mostert (born 10 April 1992) is an Australian professional racing driver competing in the Repco Supercars Championship. He currently drives the No. 1 Toyota GR Supra for Walkinshaw TWG Racing. Mostert won the 2025 Supercars Championship and the inaugural Supercars Finals Series driving for Walkinshaw Andretti United.

Mostert was the winner of the 2021 Bathurst 1000 with Lee Holdsworth and has also previously won the 2014 Bathurst 1000 with Paul Morris and the 2010 Australian Formula Ford Championship.

== Early career ==
Mostert, who grew up in Browns Plains near Brisbane, commenced kart racing at age seven in Ipswich and the Gold Coast.

Mostert progressed into Formula Ford in 2008. He finished 11th in the 2008 Australian Formula Ford Championship, fourth in 2009 and then won the 2010 Australian Formula Ford Championship with a record of the most race wins in a season.

== Touring cars ==
=== Development Series ===
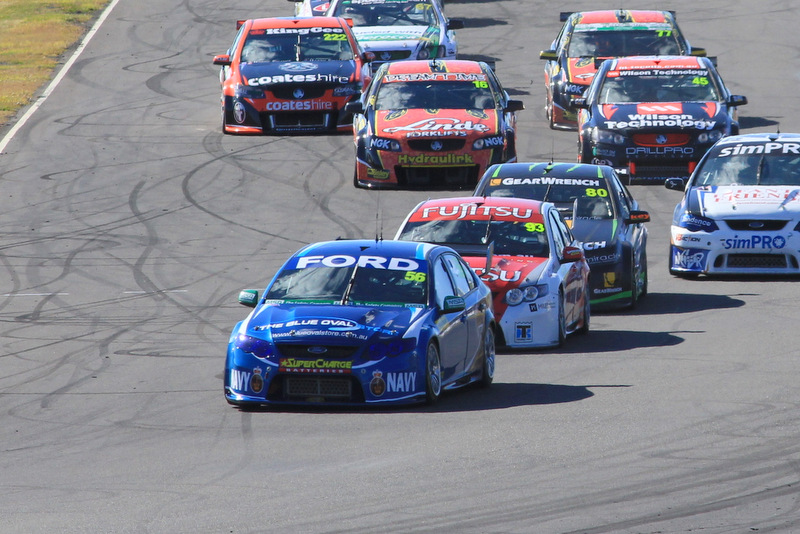
Mostert leads the Development Series field into turn 1 at Queensland Raceway

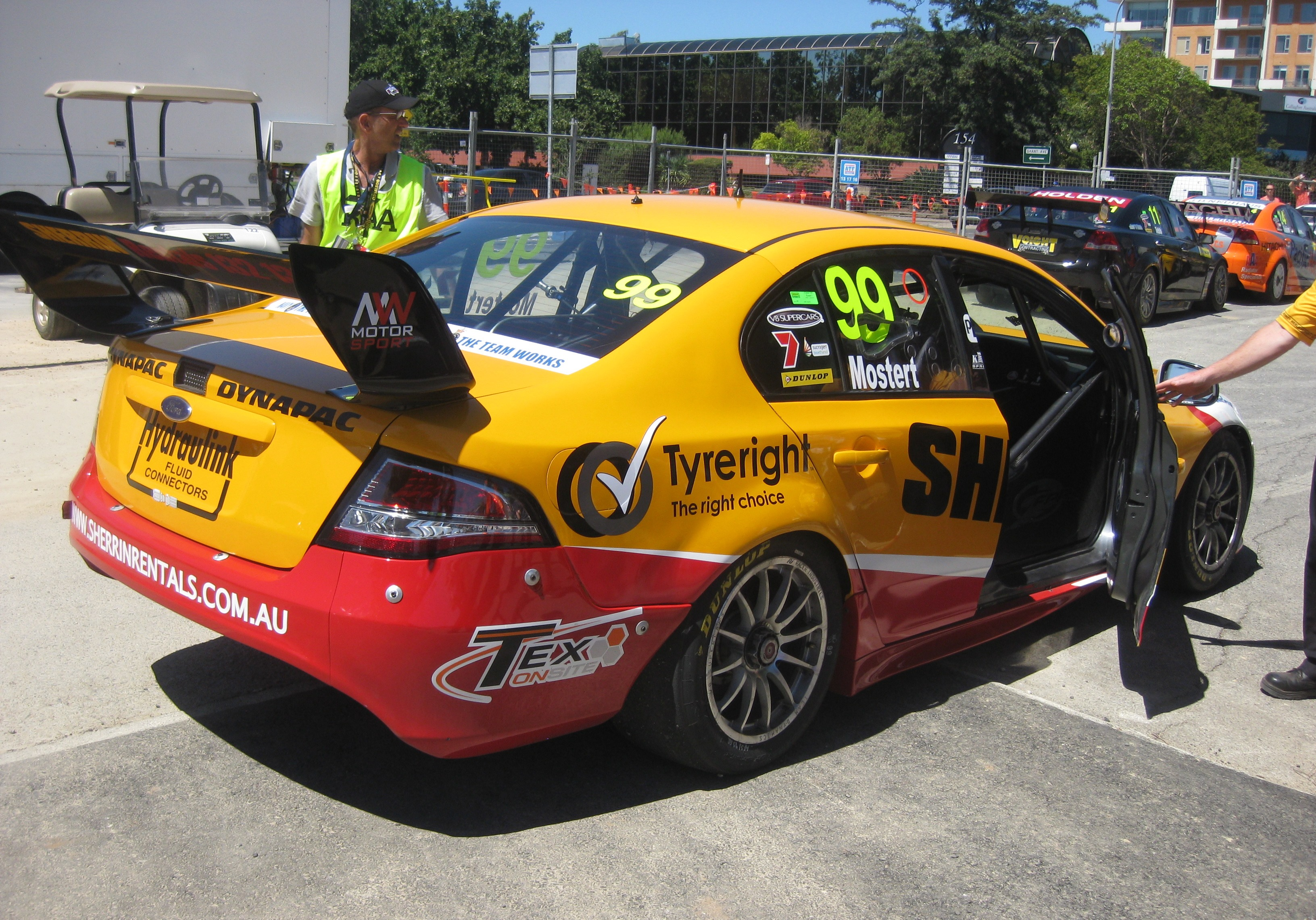
The MW Motorsport Ford FG Falcon in which Chaz Mostert won the Adelaide round of the 2013 Dunlop Series

In 2010, Mostert got the chance to drive a Miles Racing Ford BF Falcon at Bathurst in the Fujitsu V8 Supercar Series. Mostert finished 6th and 4th in the two races, leading to a deal with Miles Racing for the 2011 season. Again, he performed strongly for the team, particularly in wet conditions. Ford Performance Racing signed him for the final two rounds at Sandown and Homebush to drive the team's first Development Series car, a FG Falcon. Mostert scored a pole position on debut for the team at Sandown and took three race podiums in the final two rounds. Mostert's performances earned him the Mike Kable Young Gun Award at the end of 2011.

2012 saw Mostert continue with Ford Performance Racing in the Development Series. At the first round, the Adelaide 500, Mostert took pole and clean swept the weekend with two race wins, one of two round wins in the season. He finished third in the championship in what was considered one of the strongest ever Development Series fields, with Scott McLaughlin, Scott Pye and Nick Percat rounding out the championship top four. On 1 December 2012 Mostert was awarded an Honorary commission as a Lieutenant in the Royal Australian Navy. He was presented with his commission by the Chief of Navy Vice Admiral Raymond Griggs.

In 2013, Mostert again won the Adelaide 500 round of the Development Series, now driving for MW Motorsport. Before the second round, Mostert had been called up to V8 Supercars and did not take any further part in the championship.

=== Supercars Championship ===
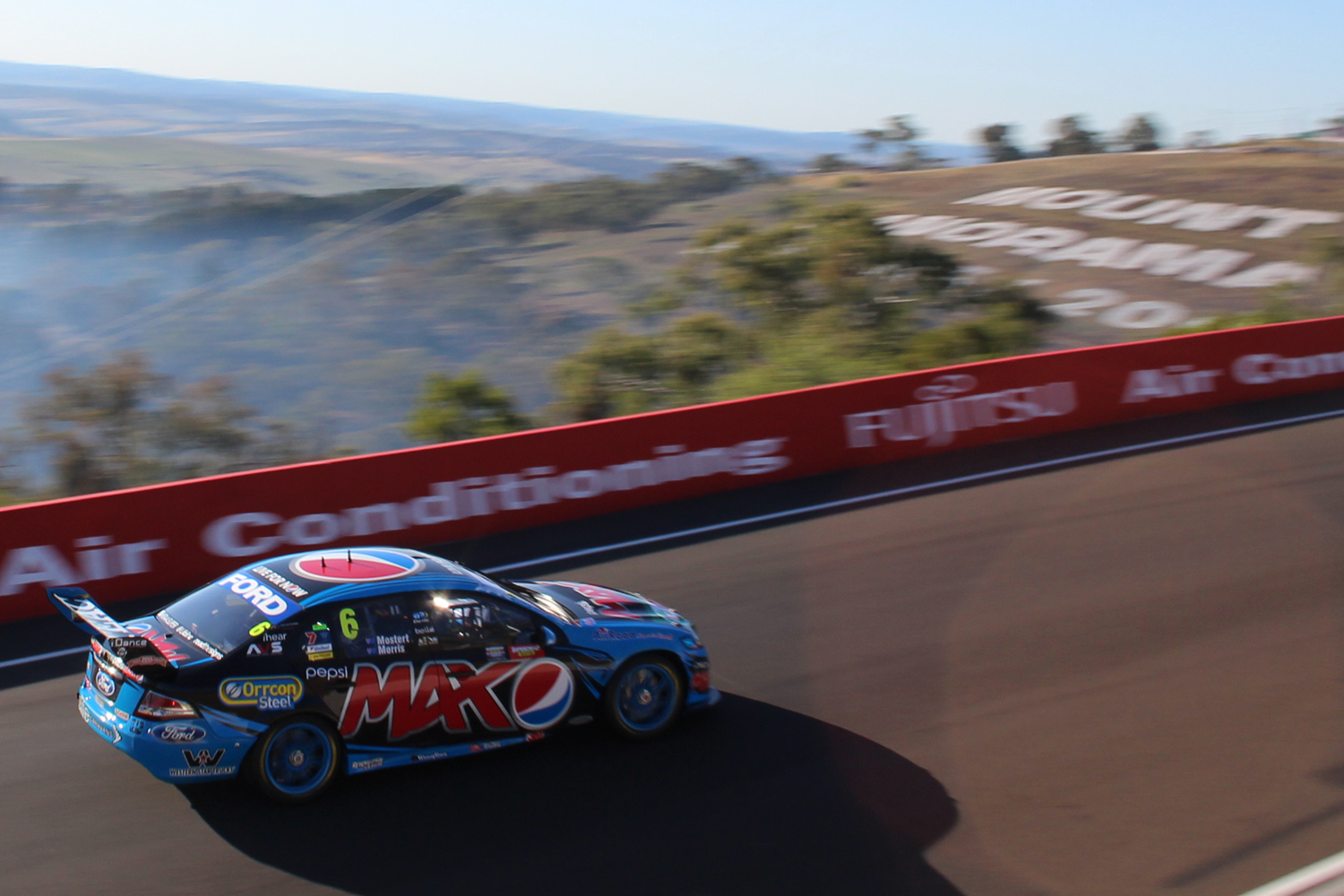
The Ford FG Falcon in which Mostert and Paul Morris won the 2014 Supercheap Auto Bathurst 1000

==== Dick Johnson Racing ====
Mostert's V8 Supercars debut was at the Perth 360 at Barbagallo Raceway for Dick Johnson Racing, replacing Jonny Reid in the seat. As part of the deal, Ford Performance Racing provided additional technical support to the team and retained a long-term deal with Mostert. On 28 July 2013, at only his fifth championship event, Mostert won his first race at the Ipswich 360 at Queensland Raceway. Ironically, the podium was rounded out by the two Ford Performance Racing entries. Mostert took one further podium at Winton and finished 17th in the championship despite missing the opening rounds. Mostert also commenced a love-hate relationship at the Bathurst 1000 by heavily crashing in Friday practice and requiring an overnight rebuild.

==== Ford Performance Racing ====
In 2014, he replaced Will Davison at Ford Performance Racing in Pepsi Max colours. Adam DeBorre remained as his engineer, transferring back to Ford Performance Racing from his spell at Dick Johnson Racing with Mostert. One year after his debut, Mostert won his second championship race at Barbagallo, also winning the round. In October 2014, Mostert won the 2014 Bathurst 1000 with co-driver Paul Morris, after overtaking the low-on-fuel Jamie Whincup on the final lap. Mostert and Morris had started at the back of the grid after being excluded from qualifying, the lowest ever starting position to win the Bathurst 1000. Mostert finished the 2014 championship in seventh place.

==== Prodrive Racing Australia ====
In 2015, Ford Performance Racing lost their factory Ford support and renamed to Prodrive Racing Australia. They also launched the Ford FG X Falcon and Mostert and team-mate Mark Winterbottom proved to be the main championship contenders. Mostert won a race each at Winton (crashing out of the lead in the other race), Hidden Valley and Queensland Raceway and two at Sydney Motorsport Park, and after a second-place finish at the Sandown 500 was 198 points behind Winterbottom heading into the Bathurst 1000. Then, in Friday qualifying for the 2015 Bathurst 1000, Mostert was involved in a horrific crash on the approach to Forrest's Elbow, leaving him with a broken leg and a broken wrist and ruling him out for the remainder of the season. Mostert's wrecked car now resides at the National Motor Racing Museum near the circuit.

==== Rod Nash Racing ====
In 2016 and 2017, Mostert drove under the Rod Nash Racing moniker, a satellite team of Prodrive Racing Australia, and now with the support of Supercheap Auto. In the first event of his return from his 2015 crash, Mostert took pole position for the Sunday race at the Adelaide 500, an achievement he ranked at the time as only second to his Bathurst 1000 win. Despite four more poles during the season, Mostert didn't take a victory and finished seventh in the championship, one place behind team-mate Winterbottom.

In 2017, Mostert broke his victory drought with three wins. The first of which was the Saturday race of the Phillip Island 500, before further wins at Queensland Raceway and the Gold Coast 600. The win at the Gold Coast helped Mostert, with co-driver Steve Owen, to win the first Enduro Cup for both the team and for Ford.

==== Tickford Racing ====
In 2018, another reshuffle of Prodrive Racing Australia saw them, and the Rod Nash Racing entry, renamed to Tickford Racing. However, the team had a difficult season and Mostert only took one victory, another win at the Gold Coast 600.

In 2019, Tickford Racing upgraded to the new Ford Mustang GT. Mostert had a moderately successful year, with a single win at Albert Park and several podiums. He was unable to race at the Gold Coast, after he wrote off his car during the Top 10 Shootout on Saturday.

==== Walkinshaw Andretti United ====
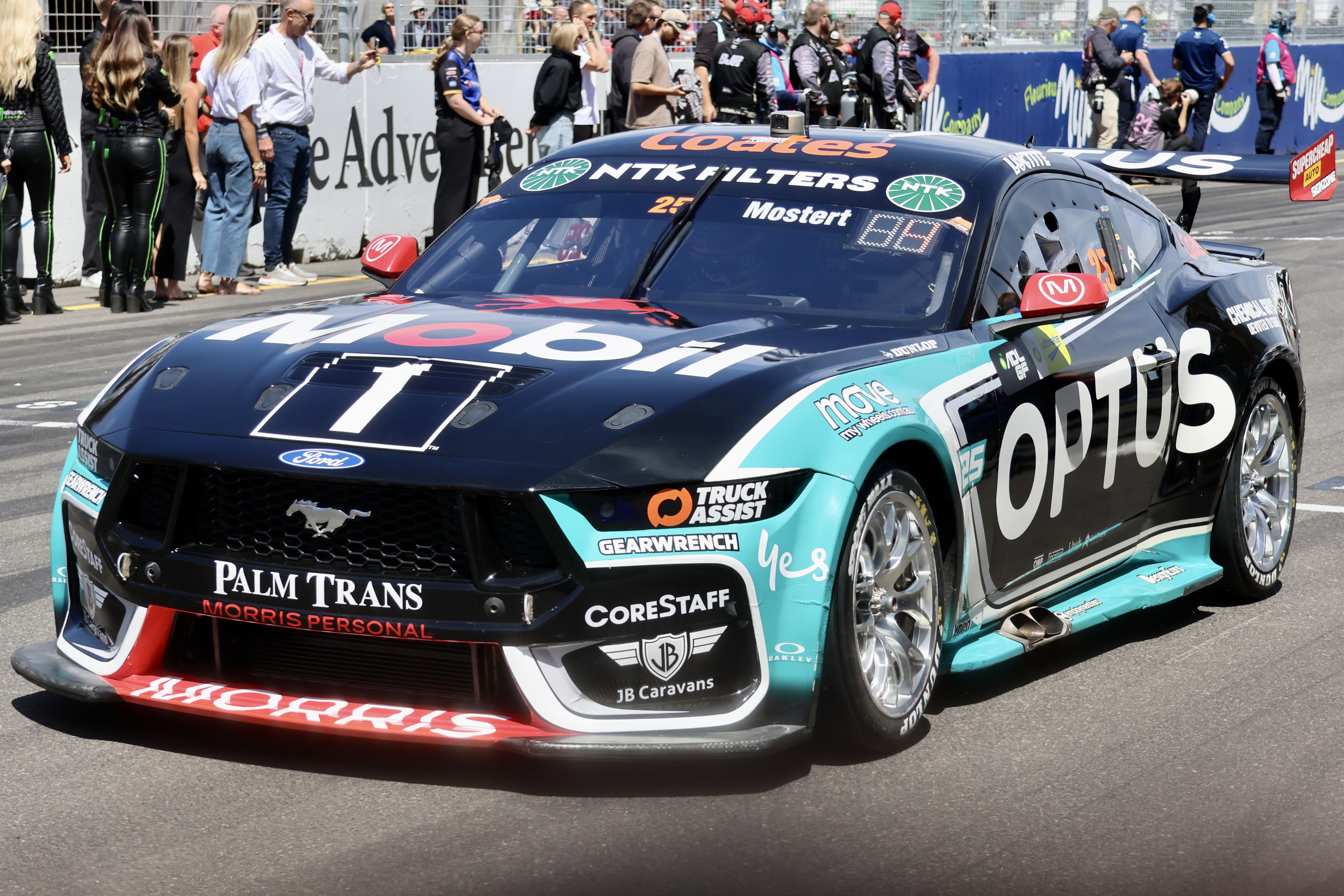
The 2025 Adelaide 500-winning Ford Mustang GT of Mostert

On the 26th of November, Mostert announced that he was leaving Tickford Racing, after being with the team for seven years, and switched not only teams, but brands, to Walkinshaw Andretti United and Holden for the 2020 season.

On the 15th of June 2021, Mostert signed a long-term contract extension to the end of the 2023 season with Walkinshaw Andretti United. He then went on to win the 2021 Darwin Triple Crown later that week.

On the 7th of November 2021, During the second 2021 Sydney SuperNight Race 25, Mostert heroically drove from last on the grid 26th in a downpour night race to go on and finish on the podium in third place.

Mostert set a new Bathurst 1000 lap record of 2:03.3736 on the 4th of December 2021 during the Top 10 Shootout qualifier while driving a Walkinshaw Andretti United Holden ZB Commodore.

On 30th November 2025, Mostert was crowned the 2025 Supercars Champion.

== Production cars ==
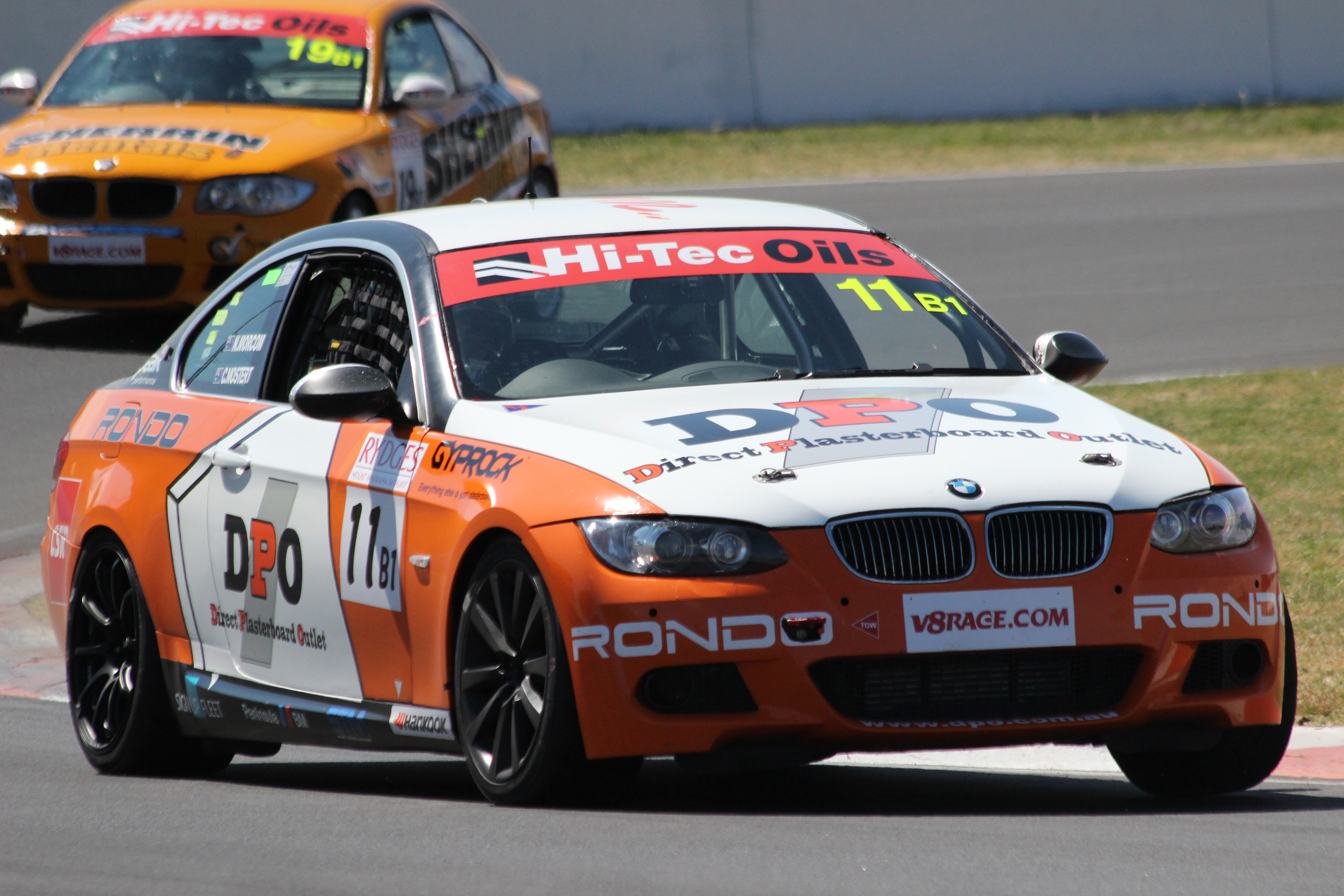
The 2016 Bathurst 6 Hour-winning BMW 335i E92 of Nathan Morcom and Mostert

In 2011, Mostert competed in the Bathurst 12 Hour in a HSV VXR Turbo, finishing third in class with Ashley Walsh and Gerard McLeod.

In 2016, Mostert, driving with Nathan Morcom, won the inaugural Bathurst 6 Hour race for Group 3E Series Production Cars, driving a BMW 335i E92.

== GT ==
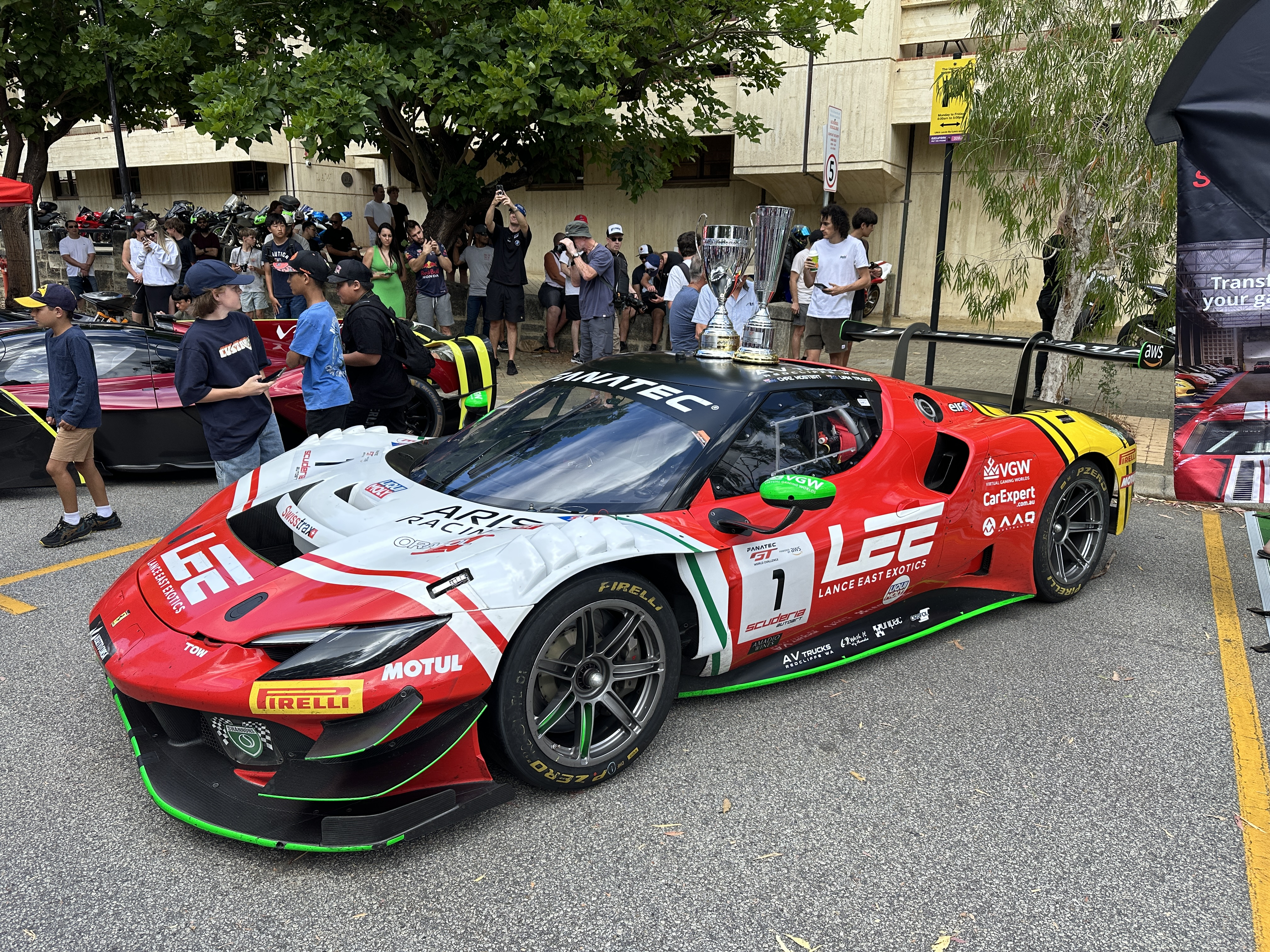
The Ferrari 296 GT3 with which Mostert won the 2024 GT World Challenge Australia title, alongside co-driver Liam Talbot

Mostert's GT career launched from further entries in the GT3 class of the Bathurst 12 Hour, starting in 2017 in a customer MARC Cars Australia BMW M6 GT3. Mostert qualified a surprise second on the grid and led the early stages of the race before technical issues struck down the car. Mostert's performance led to a call up to drive for the factory-supported Schnitzer Motorsport in 2018 and 2019. In 2018, he went one better in qualifying, taking the Allan Simonsen Pole Position Trophy, and once again started the race strongly before being involved in an incident in lapped traffic at the start of Conrod Straight.

Mostert has also been given opportunities in GT3 and LM GTE races overseas for BMW. In GT3, this has included two class victories in Asian Le Mans Series in the 2017–18 season and a fifth-place finish in the 2017 FIA GT World Cup at the Guia Circuit in Macau. In GTE, Mostert has entered the Rahal Letterman Lanigan Racing BMW M8 GTE at Petit Le Mans in 2018 and the 24 Hours of Daytona in 2019.

== Career results ==
=== Karting career summary ===
Season	Series	Position
2005	Australian Sprint Kart Championship – Junior National Light	**1st**
2006	Australian Sprint Kart Championship – Junior National Light	**1st**
2007	Australian Sprint Kart Championship – Junior Clubman	**1st**

=== Circuit racing results ===
Season	Series	Position	Car	Team
2008	Australian Formula Ford Championship	11th	Spectrum 011	Howard Racing
2009	Australian Formula Ford Championship	4th	Spectrum 011	Synergy Motorsport
2010	Australian Formula Ford Championship	**1st**	Spectrum 012	Synergy Motorsport
2010	Fujitsu V8 Supercar Series	27th	Ford BF Falcon	Miles Racing
2011	Fujitsu V8 Supercar Series	6th	Ford BF Falcon; Ford FG Falcon	Miles Racing; Ford Performance Racing
2011	Australian Production Car Championship	15th	BMW 335i	Eastern Creek Karts
2011	Australian Production Car Endurance Championship	**2nd**	BMW 335i	Eastern Creek Karts
2011	iRace Touring Car Challenge	7th	Chevrolet Silverado	Miles Racing
2012	Dunlop V8 Supercar Series	**3rd**	Ford FG Falcon	Ford Performance Racing
2013	V8SuperTourers Championship	9th	Ford FG Falcon	International Motorsport
2013	International V8 Supercars Championship	17th	Ford FG Falcon	Dick Johnson Racing
2014	International V8 Supercars Championship	7th	Ford FG Falcon	Ford Performance Racing
2015	International V8 Supercars Championship	11th	Ford FG X Falcon	Prodrive Racing Australia
2015	Kuala Lumpur City Grand Prix Supercars Challenge	**1st**	Ford FG X Falcon	Prodrive Racing Australia
2016	International V8 Supercars Championship	7th	Ford FG X Falcon	Rod Nash Racing
2017	Virgin Australia Supercars Championship	5th	Ford FG X Falcon	Rod Nash Racing
2017	Pirtek Supercars Enduro Cup	**1st**	Ford FG X Falcon	Rod Nash Racing
2017	FIA GT World Cup	5th	BMW M6 GT3	FIST Team AAI
2017	FIA GT World Cup – Gold class	**1st**	BMW M6 GT3	FIST Team AAI
2017–18	Asian Le Mans Series – GT	**3rd**	BMW M6 GT3	FIST Team AAI
2018	Virgin Australia Supercars Championship	6th	Ford FG X Falcon	Tickford Racing
2019	Virgin Australia Supercars Championship	5th	Ford Mustang GT	Tickford Racing
2020	Virgin Australia Supercars Championship	5th	Holden Commodore ZB	Walkinshaw Andretti United
2021	Repco Supercars Championship	**3rd**	Holden Commodore ZB	Walkinshaw Andretti United
2021	Supercheap Auto TCR Australia Series	**1st**	Audi RS 3 LMS TCR	Melbourne Performance Centre
2021	GT World Challenge Australia	6th	Audi R8 LMS Evo	Bostik Racing
2022	Repco Supercars Championship	**3rd**	Holden Commodore ZB	Walkinshaw Andretti United
2023	Repco Supercars Championship	4th	Ford Mustang GT S650	Walkinshaw Andretti United
2024	Repco Supercars Championship	**3rd**	Ford Mustang GT S650	Walkinshaw Andretti United
2024	GT World Challenge Australia	**1st**	Ferrari 296 GT3	Arise Racing GT
2025	Repco Supercars Championship	**1st**	Ford Mustang GT S650	Walkinshaw Andretti United
2025	Race of Champions – Drivers	**2nd**	Various	RoC

=== Touring Cars ===
==== Super2 Series results ====
(Races in bold indicate pole position) (Races in italics indicate fastest lap) (key) (Races in bold indicate pole position) (Races in italics indicate fastest lap)

Super2 Series results
Year	Team	No.	Car	1	2	3	4	5	6	7	8	9	10	11	12	13	14	15	16	17	18	Position	Points
2010	Miles Racing	86	Ford BF Falcon	ADE; R1	ADE; R2	QLD; R3	QLD; R4	QLD; R5	WIN; R6	WIN; R7	WIN; R8	TOW; R9	TOW; R10	TOW; R11	BAT; R12; 6	BAT; R13; 4	SAN; R14	SAN; R15	SAN; R16	SYD; R17	SYD; R18	27th	222
2011	Miles Racing	10	Ford BF Falcon	ADE; R1; 9	ADE; R2; 6	BAR; R3; 8	BAR; R4; 6	TOW; R5; 10	TOW; R6; 10	TOW; R7; 13	QLD; R8; 14	QLD; R9; 4	QLD; R10; 17	BAT; R11; 11	BAT; R12; 7							6th	1253
2011	Ford Performance Racing	56	Ford FG Falcon													**SAN**; **R13**; 2	SAN; R14; 15	SAN; R15; 2	SYD; R16; 3	SYD; R17; 5		6th	1253
2012	Ford Performance Racing	56	Ford FG Falcon	**ADE**; **R1**; 1	**ADE**; **R2**; 1	BAR; R3; 4	BAR; R4; 5	BAR; R5; 3	**TOW**; **R6**; 3	TOW; R7; 19	TOW; R8; 3	QLD; R9; 1	**QLD**; **R10**; 5	QLD; R11; 1	**BAT**; **R12**; 2	BAT; R13; 2	**WIN**; **R14**; 5	WIN; R15; 19	WIN; R16; 5	**SYD**; **R17**; 6	SYD; R18; 2	3rd	1665
2013	MW Motorsport	99	Ford FG Falcon	**ADE**; **R1**; 2	ADE; R2; 1	BAR; R3	BAR; R4	BAR; R5	TOW; R6	TOW; R7	TOW; R8	QLD; R9	QLD; R10	QLD; R11	WIN; R12	WIN; R13	WIN; R14	BAT; R15	BAT; R16	SYD; R17	SYD; R18	29th	288

==== Supercars Championship results ====
(Races in bold indicate pole position) (Races in italics indicate fastest lap)

Supercars results
Year	Team	No.	Car	1	2	3	4	5	6	7	8	9	10	11	12	13	14	15	16	17	18	19	20	21	22	23	24	25	26	27	28	29	30	31	32	33	34	35	36	37	38	39	Position	Points
2013	Dick Johnson Racing	12	Ford FG Falcon	ADE; R1	ADE; R2	SYM; R3	SYM; R4	SYM; R5	PUK; R6	PUK; R7	PUK; R8	PUK; R9	BAR; R10; 15	BAR; R11; 15	BAR; R12; 10	COA; R13; 13	COA; R14; 19	COA; R15; 13	COA; R16; 15	HID; R17; 7	HID; R18; 17	HID; R19; 17	TOW; R20; 10	TOW; R21; 13	QLD; R22; 23	QLD; R23; 6	QLD; R24; 1	WIN; R25; 16	WIN; R26; 13	WIN; R27; 3	SAN; QR; 5	SAN; R28; 14	BAT; R29; 21	SUR; R30; 9	SUR; R31; 11	PHI; R32; 9	PHI; R33; 4	PHI; R34; Ret	SYD; R35; 21	SYD; R36; 9			17th	1520
2014	Ford Performance Racing	6	Ford FG Falcon	ADE; R1; Ret	ADE; R2; 6	ADE; R3; Ret	SYM; R4; 13	SYM; R5; 18	SYM; R6; 14	WIN; R7; 12	WIN; R8; 10	WIN; R9; 6	PUK; R10; 21	PUK; R11; 3	PUK; R12; 16	PUK; R13; 3	BAR; R14; 3	BAR; R15; 6	BAR; R16; 1	HID; R17; 14	HID; R18; 14	HID; R19; 15	TOW; R20; 13	TOW; R21; 5	TOW; R22; 7	QLD; R23; 14	QLD; R24; 3	QLD; R25; 3	SMP; R26; 13	SMP; R27; 2	SMP; R28; 10	SAN; QR; 17	SAN; R29; 7	BAT; R30; 1	SUR; R31; 6	SUR; R32; 17	PHI; R33; 14	PHI; R34; 9	PHI; R35; 16	SYD; R36; 15	SYD; R37; 15	SYD; R38; 5	7th	2451
2015	Prodrive Racing Australia	6	Ford FG X Falcon	ADE; R1; 2	ADE; R2; Ret	ADE; R3; Ret	SYM; R4; 5	SYM; R5; 12	SYM; R6; 2	**BAR**; **R7**; **2**	BAR; R8; 4	**BAR**; **R9**; **4**	**WIN**; **R10**; **1**	**WIN**; **R11**; **3**	**WIN**; **R12**; **25**	HID; R13; 1	HID; R14; 3	HID; R15; 2	**TOW**; **R16**; **8**	TOW; R17; 6	**QLD**; **R18**; **5**	QLD; R19; 3	**QLD**; **R20**; **1**	**SMP**; **R21**; **1**	**SMP**; **R22**; **3**	SMP; R23; 1	SAN; QR; 3	SAN; R24; 2	BAT; R25; DNS	SUR; R26	SUR; R27	PUK; R28	PUK; R29	PUK; R30	PHI; R31	PHI; R32	PHI; R33	SYD; R34	SYD; R35	SYD; R36			11th	2017
2016	Rod Nash Racing	55	Ford FG X Falcon	ADE; R1; 16	**ADE**; **R2**; **3**	ADE; R3; Ret	SYM; R4; 10	SYM; R5; 5	PHI; R6; 23	PHI; R7; 8	BAR; R8; 12	**BAR**; **R9**; **6**	WIN; R10; 7	**WIN**; **R11**; **20**	HID; R12; 3	HID; R13; 23	TOW; R14; 4	TOW; R15; 16	QLD; R16; 5	QLD; R17; 3	**SMP**; **R18**; **4**	**SMP**; **R19**; **3**	SAN; QR; 5	SAN; R20; 5	BAT; R21; 19	SUR; R22; 9	SUR; R23; 6	PUK; R24; 21	PUK; R25; 3	PUK; R26; 6	PUK; R27; 4	SYD; R28; 17	SYD; R29; 11										7th	2361
2017	Rod Nash Racing	55	Ford FG X Falcon	ADE; R1; 9	ADE; R2; 3	SYM; R3; 5	SYM; R4; 7	PHI; R5; 11	PHI; R6; 1	BAR; R7; 6	BAR; R8; 2	WIN; R9; Ret	WIN; R10; 8	HID; R11; 5	HID; R12; 17	TOW; R13; 4	TOW; R14; 5	QLD; R15; 2	QLD; R16; 1	SMP; R17; 2	SMP; R18; 5	SAN; QR; 3	SAN; R19; 3	BAT; R20; 10	**SUR**; **R21**; **1**	SUR; R22; 7	PUK; R23; 23	PUK; R24; 7	NEW; R25; 6	NEW; R26; 15													5th	2748
2018	Tickford Racing	55	Ford FG X Falcon	ADE; R1; 7	ADE; R2; 4	MEL; R3; 5	MEL; R4; 6	MEL; R5; 10	MEL; R6; 4	SYM; R7; Ret	SYM; R8; 10	PHI; R9; 5	PHI; R10; 5	BAR; R11; 10	BAR; R12; 11	WIN; R13; 14	WIN; R14; 10	HID; R15; 17	HID; R16; 12	TOW; R17; 13	TOW; R18; 5	QLD; R19; 6	QLD; R20; 3	SMP; R21; 5	BEN; R22; 9	BEN; R23; 12	SAN; QR; 7	SAN; R24; 10	BAT; R25; 4	SUR; R26; 1	SUR; R27; C	PUK; R28; 3	PUK; R29; 6	NEW; R30; 21	NEW; R31; 7								6th	2807
2019	Tickford Racing	55	Ford Mustang S550	ADE; R1; 5	ADE; R2; 15	MEL; R3; 5	MEL; R4; 2	MEL; R5; 1	**MEL**; **R6**; **2**	SYM; R7; 10	SYM; R8; 10	PHI; R9; 5	PHI; R10; 5	BAR; R11; 3	BAR; R12; Ret	**WIN**; **R13**; **2**	WIN; R14; 10	HID; R15; 2	HID; R16; 6	TOW; R17; 3	TOW; R18; 5	QLD; R19; 3	QLD; R20; 3	**BEN**; **R21**; **2**	BEN; R22; 3	PUK; R23; 24	PUK; R24; 3	**BAT**; **R25**; **15**	SUR; R26; DNS	SUR; R27; DNS	SAN; QR; 9	SAN; R28; 2	NEW; R29; 11	NEW; R30; 6									5th	2879
2020	Walkinshaw TWG Racing	25	Holden ZB Commodore	ADE; R1; 7	ADE; R2; 2	MEL; R3; C	MEL; R4; C	MEL; R5; C	MEL; R6; C	SMP1; R7; 4	SMP1; R8; 4	SMP1; R9; 16	SMP2; R10; 11	SMP2; R11; 5	SMP2; R12; 9	HID1; R13; 7	HID1; R14; 8	HID1; R15; 4	HID2; R16; 9	HID2; R17; 18	HID2; R18; 6	TOW1; R19; 3	TOW1; R20; 2	TOW1; R21; 24	TOW2; R22; 3	TOW2; R23; 10	TOW2; R24; 4	**BEN1**; **R25**; **11**	BEN1; R26; 11	BEN1; R27; 16	BEN2; R28; 11	BEN2; R29; 8	BEN2; R30; 6	BAT; R31; 3									5th	1958
2021	Walkinshaw TWG Racing	25	Holden ZB Commodore	BAT1; R1; 2	BAT1; R2; 3	**SAN**; **R3**; **6**	SAN; R4; 4	SAN; R5; 24	SYM; R6; 4	SYM; R7; 6	SYM; R8; 1	BEN; R9; 2	BEN; R10; Ret	BEN; R11; 5	HID; R12; 1	HID; R13; 4	HID; R14; 4	TOW1; R15; 14	TOW1; R16; 9	TOW2; R17; 3	TOW2; R18; 3	TOW2; R19; 9	SMP1; R20; 6	SMP1; R21; 7	SMP1; R22; 7	SMP2; R23; 14	SMP2; R24; 8	SMP2; R25; 3	SMP3; R26; 11	SMP3; R27; 4	SMP3; R28; 8	SMP4; R29; 5	SMP4; R30; C	**BAT2**; **R31**; **1**									3rd	2494
2022	Walkinshaw TWG Racing	25	Holden ZB Commodore	SMP; R1; 3	SMP; R2; 1	SYM; R3; 23	SYM; R4; 4	SYM; R5; 18	MEL; R6; 1	MEL; R7; 22	MEL; R8; 5	MEL; R9; 1	BAR; R10; 22	BAR; R11; 12	BAR; R12; 19	WIN; R13; 4	WIN; R14; 5	WIN; R15; 11	HID; R16; DSQ	HID; R17; 8	HID; R18; 1	TOW; R19; 9	TOW; R20; 5	BEN; R21; 3	BEN; R22; 2	BEN; R23; 8	SAN; R24; 10	SAN; R25; 2	SAN; R26; 4	PUK; R27; 4	PUK; R28; 2	PUK; R29; 6	BAT; R30; 2	SUR; R31; 3	SUR; R32; 2	ADE; R33; 1	ADE; R34; 2						3rd	2835
2023	Walkinshaw TWG Racing	25	Ford Mustang S650	NEW; R1; 2	NEW; R2; 2	MEL; R3; 5	MEL; R4; 5	MEL; R5; 4	MEL; R6; 14	BAR; R7; 11	BAR; R8; 4	BAR; R9; 5	SYM; R10; Ret	SYM; R11; 6	SYM; R12; 6	HID; R13; 8	HID; R14; 13	HID; R15; 9	TOW; R16; 3	TOW; R17; Ret	SMP; R18; 2	SMP; R19; 7	BEN; R20; 2	BEN; R21; 3	BEN; R22; 9	SAN; R23; 22	BAT; R24; 4	SUR; R25; 8	SUR; R26; 13	ADE; R27; 4	ADE; R28; 5												4th	2287
2024	Walkinshaw TWG Racing	25	Ford Mustang S650	BAT1; R1; 3	BAT1; R2; 2	MEL; R3; 4	MEL; R4; 17	MEL; R5; 3	**MEL**; **R6**; **5**	TAU; R7; 22	TAU; R8; 7	**BAR**; **R9**; **1**	BAR; R10; 2	HID; R11; 5	HID; R12; 16	TOW; R13; 2	TOW; R14; 3	SMP; R15; 1	SMP; R16; 1	SYM; R17; 2	SYM; R18; 4	SAN; R19; 7	BAT; R20; 5	SUR; R21; 10	SUR; R22; 11	ADE; R23; 13	ADE; R24; 2																3rd	2667
2025	Walkinshaw TWG Racing	25	Ford Mustang S650	SYD; R1; 2	SYD; R2; 4	SYD; R3; 3	MEL; R4; 10	MEL; R5; 10	MEL; R6; 22	MEL; R7; C	TAU; R8; 13	TAU; R9; 1	TAU; R10; 3	SYM; R11; 14	SYM; R12; 19	SYM; R13; 18	**BAR**; **R14**; **3**	BAR; R15; 3	BAR; R16; 6	HID; R17; 6	HID; R18; 17	HID; R19; 12	TOW; R20; 6	TOW; R21; 2	TOW; R22; 3	QLD; R23; 25	QLD; R24; 7	QLD; R25; 6	BEN; R26; 8	BAT; R27; Ret	SUR; R28; 1	SUR; R29; 1	SAN; R30; 1	SAN; R31; 4	ADE; R32; 2	ADE; R33; 2	ADE; R34; 2						1st	5306
2026	Walkinshaw TWG Racing	1	Toyota GR Supra	SYD; R1; 15	SYD; R2; DSQ	SYD; R3; 4	MEL; R4; 5	MEL; R5; 14	MEL; R6; 5	MEL; R7; 8	TAU; R8; 7	TAU; R9; 3	CHR; R10; 8	CHR; R11; 13	CHR; R12; 12	CHR; R13; 17	**SYM**; **R14**; **1**	SYM; R15; 20	SYM; R16; 9	HID; R17; 7	HID; R18; 6	HID; R19; Ret	TOW; R20; 5	TOW; R21; 7	TOW; R22; 4	BAR; R23; 5	BAR; R24; 4	BAR; R25; 6	QLD; R26; 6	QLD; R27; 5	QLD; R28; Ret	BEN; R29; 1	BAT; R30 ret	SUR; R31; 1	SUR; R32; 3	SAN; R33	SAN; R34	ADE; R35	ADE; R36	ADE; R37			4th*	4078*

==== Complete Bathurst 1000 results ====
Year	Team	Car	Co-driver	Position	Laps
2013	Dick Johnson Racing	Ford Falcon FG	(Australia) Dale Wood	21st	156
2014	Ford Performance Racing	Ford Falcon FG	(Australia) Paul Morris	**1st**	161
2015	Prodrive Racing Australia	Ford Falcon FG X	(Australia) Cam Waters	DNS	0
2016	Rod Nash Racing	Ford Falcon FG X	(Australia) Steve Owen	19th	147
2017	Rod Nash Racing	Ford Falcon FG X	(Australia) Steve Owen	10th	161
2018	Tickford Racing	Ford Falcon FG X	(Australia) James Moffat	4th	161
2019	Tickford Racing	Ford Mustang Mk.6	(Australia) James Moffat	15th	160
2020	Walkinshaw Andretti United	Holden Commodore ZB	(Australia) Warren Luff	**3rd**	161
2021	Walkinshaw Andretti United	Holden Commodore ZB	(Australia) Lee Holdsworth	**1st**	161
2022	Walkinshaw Andretti United	Holden Commodore ZB	(New Zealand) Fabian Coulthard	**2nd**	161
2023	Walkinshaw Andretti United	Ford Mustang S650	(Australia) Lee Holdsworth	4th	161
2024	Walkinshaw Andretti United	Ford Mustang S650	(Australia) Lee Holdsworth	5th	161
2025	Walkinshaw Andretti United	Ford Mustang S650	(New Zealand) Fabian Coulthard	DNF	57
2026	Walkinshaw TWG Racing	Toyota GR Supra	(New Zealand) Fabian Coulthard	DNF	155

==== TCR Australia results ====
(Races in bold indicate pole position) (Races in italics indicate fastest lap)

TCR Australia results
Year	Team	Car	1	2	3	4	5	6	7	8	9	10	11	12	13	14	15	Position	Points
2021	Melbourne Performance Centre	Audi RS 3 LMS TCR	SYM; R1; 5	SYM; R2; 3	SYM; R3; 2	**PHI**; **R4**; **1**	**PHI**; **R5**; **1**	**PHI**; **R6**; **18**	**BAT**; **R7**; **1**	**BAT**; **R8**; **1**	**BAT**; **R9**; **1**	SMP; R10; 3	SMP; R11; 2	SMP; R12; 6	BAT; R13; 8	BAT; R14; WD	BAT; R15; WD	**1st**	**486**

=== Sports/GT Cars ===
==== Complete IMSA SportsCar Championship results ====
(key) (Races in bold indicate pole position) (Races in italics indicate fastest lap)

Year	Team	Class	Car	1	2	3	4	5	6	7	8	9	10	11	Pos.	Points
2018	BMW Team RLL	GTLM	BMW M8 GTE	DAY	SEB	LBH	MOH	WGL	MOS	LRP	ROA	VIR	LGA	**PET**; **3**	19th	30
2019	BMW Team RLL	GTLM	BMW M8 GTE	DAY; 9	SEB	LBH	MDO	WGL	MOS	LIM	ELK	VIR	LGA	PET	24th	22
2020	BMW Team RLL	GTLM	BMW M8 GTE	DAY; 1	DAY	SEB	ELK	VIR	ATL	MDO	CLT	PET	LGA	SEB	13th	32
2024	SunEnergy1 Racing	GTD Pro	Mercedes-AMG GT3 Evo	DAY	SEB	LGA	DET	WGL	MOS	ELK	VIR	IMS; 7	PET		39th	263
2026	SunEnergy1 Racing	GTD Pro	Mercedes-AMG GT3 Evo	DAY; 2	SEB	LBH	LGA								27th	584
2026	Vasser Sullivan Racing	GTD Pro	Lexus RC F GT3					DET; 10	WGL	MOS	ELK	VIR	IMS	PET	27th	584

===== Australian GT Championship results =====
(Races in bold indicate pole position) (Races in italics indicate fastest lap)

Australian GT Championship results
Year	Team	Car	1	2	3	4	5	6	7	8	9	10	11	12	Position	Points
2021	Bostik Racing	Audi R8 LMS Evo	**PHI**; **R1**; **3**	PHI; R2; 5	BAT; R3; 3	BAT; R4; 3	BEN; R5	BEN; R6	BAT; R7	BAT; R8					6th	57
2022	CoinSpot Racing	Audi R8 LMS Evo	**PHI**; **R1**; **1**	**PHI**; **R2**; **2**	QLD; R3	QLD; R4	SAN; R5	SAN; R6	BEN; R7	BEN; R8	BAT; R9	BAT; R10	ADL; R11	ADL; R12	10th	43
2024	Arise Racing GT	Ferrari 296 GT3	PHI; R1; 1	**PHI**; **R2**; **4**	BEN; R3; 2	BEN; R4; 2	QLD; R5; 10	QLD; R6; 4	**PHI**; **R7**; **1**	**PHI**; **R8**; **2**	**SMP**; **R9**; **1**	**SMP**; **R10**; **2**	**BAT**; **R11**; **2**	BAT; R12; 3	1st	174

==== Complete Bathurst 12 Hour results ====
Year	Team	Co-drivers	Car	Class	Laps	Overall position	Class position
2011	(Australia) Racer Industries	(Australia) Ashley Walsh (Australia) Gerard McLeod	HSV VXR Turbo	E	227	16th	**3rd**
2017	MARC Cars Australia	(Australia) Morgan Haber (Australia) Max Twigg	BMW M6 GT3	AAM	136	DNF	
2018	(Germany) BMW Team Schnitzer	(Germany) Marco Wittmann (Brazil) Augusto Farfus	BMW M6 GT3	**P**	217	DNF	
2019	(Germany) BMW Team Schnitzer	(Brazil) Augusto Farfus (Germany) Martin Tomczyk	BMW M6 GT3	**P**	312	5th	5th
2020	(Germany) BMW Team Schnitzer	(Brazil) Augusto Farfus (Netherlands) Nicky Catsburg	BMW M6 GT3	**P**	166	DNF	
2022	(Australia) Coinspot Racing Team	(Australia) Fraser Ross (Australia) Liam Talbot	Audi R8 LMS Evo II	**PA**	161	DNF	
2023	(Australia) Sportsbet Team MPC	(Australia) Fraser Ross (Australia) Liam Talbot	Audi R8 LMS Evo II	**PA**	321	7th	**1st**
2024	(Australia) Method Motorsport	(Australia) Jesse Bryan (Australia) Marcos Flack	McLaren Artura GT4	**GT4**	217	22nd	**3rd**
2025	(Australia) Arise Racing GT	(Australia) Will Brown (Brazil) Daniel Serra	Ferrari 296 GT3	**P**	306	4th	4th
2026	(Australia) Scott Taylor Motorsport	(Australia) Thomas Randle (Australia) Cameron Waters	Mercedes-AMG GT3 Evo	**P**	238	DNF	

==== Complete Bathurst 6 Hour results ====
Year	Team	Co-drivers	Car	Class	Laps	Pos.	Class pos.
2016	(Australia) Direct Plasterboard Outlet	(Australia) Nathan Morcom	BMW 335i E92	B1	125	**1st**	**1st**
2017	(Australia) Direct Plasterboard Outlet	(Australia) Nathan Morcom	Ford Focus RS LZ	A1	113	**2nd**	**2nd**
2018	(Australia) Direct Plasterboard Outlet	(Australia) Nathan Morcom	Ford Focus RS LZ	A1	106	16th	11th

==== Complete Petit Le Mans results ====
Year	Team	Co-drivers	Car	Class	Laps	Overall position	Class position
2018	(United States) BMW Team RLL	(United States) John Edwards (Finland) Jesse Krohn	BMW M8 GTE	GTLM	553	14th	**3rd**

==== Complete Daytona 24 Hour results ====
Year	Team	Co-drivers	Car	Class	Laps	Overall position	Class position
2019	(United States) BMW Team RLL	(United States) John Edwards (Italy) Alex Zanardi (Finland) Jesse Krohn	BMW M8 GTE	GTLM	553	31st	9th
2020	(United States) BMW Team RLL	(United States) John Edwards (Brazil) Augusto Farfus (Finland) Jesse Krohn	BMW M8 GTE	GTLM	786	13th	**1st**
2026	(Australia) 75 Express	(Australia) Kenny Habul (Germany) Maro Engel (Australia) Will Power	Mercedes-AMG GT3 Evo	GTDPro	662	20th	**2nd**

==== Complete 24 Hour of Spa results ====
Year	Team	Co-drivers	Car	Class	Laps	Overall position	Class position
2023	(Australia) SunEnergy1 Racing	(Netherlands) Nicky Catsburg (Austria) Martin Konrad (Germany) Adam Osieka	Mercedes-AMG GT3 Evo	Pro-Am	533	22nd	**1st**

Sporting positions
Preceded by Nick Percat	Australian Formula Ford Championship; Champion; 2010	Succeeded by Cam Waters
Preceded by Mark Winterbottom; Steven Richards	Winner of the Bathurst 1000; 2014; With: Paul Morris	Succeeded by Craig Lowndes; Steven Richards
Preceded by Shane van Gisbergen; Garth Tander	Winner of the Bathurst 1000; 2021; With: Lee Holdsworth	Succeeded by Shane van Gisbergen; Garth Tander
Preceded by Will Brown	Winner of the TCR Australia Touring Car Series; 2021	Succeeded by Tony D'Alberto
Preceded by Liam Talbot	Winner of the GT World Challenge Australia; 2024; With: Liam Talbot	Succeeded by Liam Talbot; Broc Feeney
Preceded by Will Brown	Winner of the Supercars Championship; 2025	Succeeded by Incumbent
Awards and achievements
Preceded by Tim Blanchard	Mike Kable Young Gun Award; 2011	Succeeded by Scott Pye
Preceded by Inaugural	Allan Simonsen Trophy (Pole position Bathurst 12 Hour); 2018	Succeeded by Raffaele Marciello
Preceded by Jamie Whincup	Larry Perkins Trophy; 2019	Succeeded by Shane van Gisbergen
Preceded by Matt Campbell	Allan Simonsen Trophy (Pole position Bathurst 12 Hour); 2022	Succeeded by Maro Engel
Preceded by Lee Holdsworth	Barry Sheene Medal; 2023–2024	Succeeded by Broc Feeney
Preceded by Inaugural	Jim Richards Medal; 2024	Succeeded by Broc Feeney
