= 2021 Townsville 500 =

2021 race event of the Supercars Championship

(New South Wales) Townsville 500
Event Information
- Round 6 of 12 in the 2021 Supercars Championship
- Date: 17–18 July 2021
- Location: Townsville, Queensland
- Venue: Reid Park Street Circuit

Results
Race 1
Distance	88 laps	250 km
Pole position	(New Zealand) Shane van Gisbergen; Triple Eight Race Engineering	
Winner	(New Zealand) Shane van Gisbergen; Triple Eight Race Engineering	
Race 2
Distance	88 laps	250 km
Pole position	(Australia) Jamie Whincup; Triple Eight Race Engineering	
Winner	(New Zealand) Shane van Gisbergen; Triple Eight Race Engineering	
Round Results
First	(New Zealand) Shane van Gisbergen; Triple Eight Race Engineering	300 pts
Second	(Australia) Jamie Whincup; Triple Eight Race Engineering	276 pts
Third	(Australia) Anton de Pasquale; Dick Johnson Racing	258 pts

The 2021 Townsville 500 (known for commercial reasons as the 2021 NTI Townsville 500) was a motor racing event for Supercars that was held on the weekend of 9–11 July 2021. It was held at the Reid Park Street Circuit in Townsville, Queensland, Australia and featured 2x250km race. The event was the sixth round of the 2021 Supercars Championship.

== Report ==
=== Background ===
The event is the 13th year that Supercars held a round at the event, since it first started in 2009 and the 14th event at the venue, including two rounds during 2020 and was the first time since 2014 that a it utilised a 500 km format.

Shane van Gisbergen came into the round with a 221 points lead over team-mate Jamie Whincup.

== Entry list ==
No.	Driver	Team (Sponsor)	Car	No.	Driver	Team (Sponsor)	Car
2	(Australia) Bryce Fullwood	Walkinshaw Andretti United (Mobil 1, Middy's Electrical)	Holden Commodore ZB	19	(New Zealand) Fabian Coulthard	Team Sydney (Local Legends)	Holden Commodore ZB
3	(Australia) Tim Slade	Blanchard Racing Team (Cooldrive Auto Parts)	Ford Mustang GT	20	(Australia) Scott Pye	Team 18 (DeWALT, BP)	Holden Commodore ZB
4	(Australia) Jack Smith	Brad Jones Racing (SCT Logistics)	Holden Commodore ZB	22	(Australia) Garry Jacobson	Team Sydney (PremiAir Hire)	Holden Commodore ZB
5	(Australia) Jack Le Brocq	Tickford Racing (Truck Assist)	Ford Mustang GT	25	(Australia) Chaz Mostert	Walkinshaw Andretti United (Mobil 1, Appliances Online)	Holden Commodore ZB
6	(Australia) Cam Waters	Tickford Racing (Monster Energy)	Ford Mustang GT	26	(Australia) David Reynolds	Kelly Grove Racing (Penrite)	Ford Mustang GT
7	(New Zealand) Andre Heimgartner	Kelly Grove Racing (Ned Whiskey, Penrite)	Ford Mustang GT	34	(Australia) Jake Kostecki	Matt Stone Racing (Unit Clothing)	Holden Commodore ZB
8	(Australia) Nick Percat	Brad Jones Racing (R&J Batteries)	Holden Commodore ZB	35	(Australia) Zane Goddard	Matt Stone Racing (Yellow Cover)	Holden Commodore ZB
9	(Australia) Will Brown	Erebus Motorsport (Pedders Suspension)	Holden Commodore ZB	44	(Australia) James Courtney	Tickford Racing (Boost Mobile)	Ford Mustang GT
11	(Australia) Anton de Pasquale	Dick Johnson Racing (Shell V-Power)	Ford Mustang GT	88	(Australia) Jamie Whincup	Triple Eight Race Engineering (Red Bull, Ampol)	Holden Commodore ZB
14	(Australia) Todd Hazelwood	Brad Jones Racing (Pizza Hut)	Holden Commodore ZB	96	(Australia) Macauley Jones	Brad Jones Racing (Coca-Cola)	Holden Commodore ZB
17	(Australia) Will Davison	Dick Johnson Racing (Shell V-Power)	Ford Mustang GT	97	(New Zealand) Shane van Gisbergen	Triple Eight Race Engineering (Red Bull, Ampol)	Holden Commodore ZB
18	(Australia) Mark Winterbottom	Team 18 (Irwin Tools, Bunnings)	Holden Commodore ZB	99	(Australia) Brodie Kostecki	Erebus Motorsport (Boost Mobile)	Holden Commodore ZB

== Results ==
=== Race 1 ===
Pos	No.	Driver	Team	Gap	Laps	Grid
1	97	(New Zealand) Shane van Gisbergen	Triple Eight Race Engineering		87	1
2	88	(Australia) Jamie Whincup	Triple Eight Race Engineering	+7.368 s	87	2
3	11	(Australia) Anton de Pasquale	Dick Johnson Racing	+37.453 s	87	4
4	8	(Australia) Nick Percat	Brad Jones Racing	+48.879 s	87	5
5	26	(Australia) David Reynolds	Kelly Grove Racing	+51.354 s	87	9
6	3	(Australia) Tim Slade	Blanchard Racing Team	+51.986 s	87	8
7	44	(Australia) James Courtney	Tickford Racing	+1:00.213 s	87	6
8	6	(Australia) Cam Waters	Tickford Racing	+1 Lap	86	10
9	17	(Australia) Will Davison	Dick Johnson Racing	+1 Lap	86	3
10	18	(Australia) Mark Winterbottom	Team 18	+1 Lap	86	21
11	2	(Australia) Bryce Fullwood	Walkinshaw Andretti United	+1 Lap	86	16
12	7	(New Zealand) Andre Heimgartner	Kelly Grove Racing	+1 Lap	86	11
13	99	(Australia) Brodie Kostecki	Erebus Motorsport	+1 Lap	86	13
14	25	(Australia) Chaz Mostert	Walkinshaw Andretti United	+1 Lap	86	17
15	5	(Australia) Jack Le Brocq	Tickford Racing	+1 Lap	86	7
16	96	(Australia) Macauley Jones	Brad Jones Racing	+1 Lap	86	15
17	4	(Australia) Jack Smith	Brad Jones Racing	+1 Lap	86	22
18	9	(Australia) Will Brown	Erebus Motorsport	+1 Lap	86	14
19	34	(Australia) Jake Kostecki	Matt Stone Racing	+1 Lap	86	20
20	22	(Australia) Garry Jacobson	Team Sydney	+1 Lap	86	24
21	19	(New Zealand) Fabian Coulthard	Team Sydney	+2 Lap	85	23
22	14	(Australia) Todd Hazelwood	Brad Jones Racing	+8 Lap	79	19
23	20	(Australia) Scott Pye	Team 18	+10 Lap	77	12
24	35	(Australia) Zane Goddard	Matt Stone Racing	+11 Lap	76	18

=== Race 2 ===
Pos	No.	Driver	Team	Gap	Laps	Grid
1	97	(New Zealand) Shane van Gisbergen	Triple Eight Race Engineering		88	2
2	88	(Australia) Jamie Whincup	Triple Eight Race Engineering	+2.925 s	88	1
3	11	(Australia) Anton de Pasquale	Dick Johnson Racing	+23.334 s	88	5
4	17	(Australia) Will Davison	Dick Johnson Racing	+40.034 s	88	8
5	9	(Australia) Will Brown	Erebus Motorsport	+46.588 s	88	7
6	6	(Australia) Cam Waters	Tickford Racing	+50.408 s	88	8
7	14	(Australia) Todd Hazelwood	Brad Jones Racing	+53.414 s	88	3
8	3	(Australia) Tim Slade	Blanchard Racing Team	+53.758 s	88	9
9	25	(Australia) Chaz Mostert	Walkinshaw Andretti United	+1.02.154 s	88	12
10	5	(Australia) Jack Le Brocq	Tickford Racing	+1.08.579 s	88	15
11	44	(Australia) James Courtney	Tickford Racing	+1.13.632 s	88	17
12	7	(New Zealand) Andre Heimgartner	Kelly Grove Racing	+1.14.964 s	88	18
13	2	(Australia) Bryce Fullwood	Walkinshaw Andretti United	+1 Lap	87	13
14	96	(Australia) Macauley Jones	Brad Jones Racing	+1 Lap	87	11
15	99	(Australia) Brodie Kostecki	Erebus Motorsport	+1 Lap	87	16
16	18	(Australia) Mark Winterbottom	Team 18	+1 Lap	87	21
17	4	(Australia) Jack Smith	Brad Jones Racing	+1 Lap	87	24
18	35	(Australia) Zane Goddard	Matt Stone Racing	+1 Lap	87	19
19	22	(Australia) Garry Jacobson	Team Sydney	+1 Lap	87	20
20	8	(Australia) Nick Percat	Brad Jones Racing	+3 Lap	85	4
21	20	(Australia) Scott Pye	Team 18	+4 Lap	84	14
22	26	(Australia) David Reynolds	Kelly Grove Racing	+14 Lap	74	10
Ret	19	(New Zealand) Fabian Coulthard	Team Sydney	Damage	0	22
DSQ	34	(Australia) Jake Kostecki	Matt Stone Racing			20
