= 2024 Toyota/Save Mart 350 =

NASCAR Cup Series race

Race details
- Race 16 of 36 in the 2024 NASCAR Cup Series
- Date: June 9, 2024
- Location: Sonoma Raceway in Sonoma, California
- Course: Permanent racing facility
- Course length: 1.99 miles (3.20 km)
- Distance: 110 laps, 218.9 mi (352.285 km)
- Average speed: 74.526 miles per hour (119.938 km/h)

Pole position
Driver	Joey Logano	Team Penske
- Time: 1:13.273

Most laps led
Driver	Tyler Reddick	23XI Racing
- Laps: 35

Winner
No. 5	Kyle Larson	Hendrick Motorsports

Television in the United States
- Network: Fox
- Announcers: Mike Joy, Clint Bowyer, and Kevin Harvick

Radio in the United States
- Radio: PRN
- Booth announcers: Doug Rice and Mark Garrow
- Turn announcers: Doug Turnbull (2, 3, & 3a), Brad Gillie (4a & 7a), Pat Patterson (8 & 9), and Rob Albright (10 & 11)

The 2024 Toyota/Save Mart 350 was a NASCAR Cup Series race that was held on June 9, 2024, at Sonoma Raceway in Sonoma, California. Contested over 110 laps on the 1.99-mile (3.20 km) road course, it was the 16th race of the 2024 NASCAR Cup Series season. Kyle Larson won the race. Michael McDowell finished 2nd, and Chris Buescher finished 3rd. Chase Elliott and Ross Chastain rounded out the top five, and A. J. Allmendinger, Ryan Blaney, Tyler Reddick, Christopher Bell, and Todd Gilliland rounded out the top ten.

== Report ==
=== Background ===
Layout of Sonoma Raceway, the track where the race was held.

Sonoma Raceway is a 1.99-mile (3.20 km) road course and drag strip located on the landform known as Sears Point in the southern Sonoma Mountains in Sonoma, California, U.S. The road course features 12 turns on a hilly course with 160 feet (49 m) of total elevation change. It is host to one of only seven NASCAR Cup Series races each year that are run on road courses. It is also host to the NTT IndyCar Series and several other auto races and motorcycle races such as the American Federation of Motorcyclists series. Sonoma Raceway continues to host amateur, or club racing events which may or may not be open to the general public. The largest such car club is the Sports Car Club of America. In 2022, the race was reverted to racing the club configuration.

==== Entry list ====
- (R) denotes rookie driver.
- (i) denotes driver who is ineligible for series driver points.

No.	Driver	Team	Manufacturer
1	Ross Chastain	Trackhouse Racing	Chevrolet
2	Austin Cindric	Team Penske	Ford
3	Austin Dillon	Richard Childress Racing	Chevrolet
4	Josh Berry (R)	Stewart-Haas Racing	Ford
5	Kyle Larson	Hendrick Motorsports	Chevrolet
6	Brad Keselowski	RFK Racing	Ford
7	Corey LaJoie	Spire Motorsports	Chevrolet
8	Kyle Busch	Richard Childress Racing	Chevrolet
9	Chase Elliott	Hendrick Motorsports	Chevrolet
10	Noah Gragson	Stewart-Haas Racing	Ford
11	Denny Hamlin	Joe Gibbs Racing	Toyota
12	Ryan Blaney	Team Penske	Ford
14	Chase Briscoe	Stewart-Haas Racing	Ford
15	Kaz Grala (R)	Rick Ware Racing	Ford
16	A. J. Allmendinger (i)	Kaulig Racing	Chevrolet
17	Chris Buescher	RFK Racing	Ford
19	Martin Truex Jr.	Joe Gibbs Racing	Toyota
20	Christopher Bell	Joe Gibbs Racing	Toyota
21	Harrison Burton	Wood Brothers Racing	Ford
22	Joey Logano	Team Penske	Ford
23	Bubba Wallace	23XI Racing	Toyota
24	William Byron	Hendrick Motorsports	Chevrolet
31	Daniel Hemric	Kaulig Racing	Chevrolet
33	Will Brown	Richard Childress Racing	Chevrolet
34	Michael McDowell	Front Row Motorsports	Ford
38	Todd Gilliland	Front Row Motorsports	Ford
41	Ryan Preece	Stewart-Haas Racing	Ford
42	John Hunter Nemechek	Legacy Motor Club	Toyota
43	Erik Jones	Legacy Motor Club	Toyota
45	Tyler Reddick	23XI Racing	Toyota
47	Ricky Stenhouse Jr.	JTG Daugherty Racing	Chevrolet
48	Alex Bowman	Hendrick Motorsports	Chevrolet
51	Justin Haley	Rick Ware Racing	Ford
54	Ty Gibbs	Joe Gibbs Racing	Toyota
60	Cameron Waters	RFK Racing	Ford
71	Zane Smith (R)	Spire Motorsports	Chevrolet
77	Carson Hocevar (R)	Spire Motorsports	Chevrolet
99	Daniel Suárez	Trackhouse Racing	Chevrolet
Official entry list

== Practice ==
Ryan Blaney was the fastest in the practice session with a time of 1:13.202 seconds and a speed of 97.866 mph (157.500 km/h).

=== Practice results ===
Pos	No.	Driver	Team	Manufacturer	Time	Speed
1	12	Ryan Blaney	Team Penske	Ford	1:13.202	97.866
2	54	Ty Gibbs	Joe Gibbs Racing	Toyota	1:13.230	97.829
3	33	Will Brown	Richard Childress Racing	Chevrolet	1:13.389	97.617
Official practice results

== Qualifying ==
Joey Logano scored the pole for the race with a time of 1:13.273 and a speed of 97.771 mph (157.347 km/h).

=== Qualifying results ===
Pos	No.	Driver	Team	Manufacturer	R1	R2
1	22	Joey Logano	Team Penske	Ford	1:13.530	1:13.273
2	45	Tyler Reddick	23XI Racing	Toyota	1:13.515	1:13.356
3	12	Ryan Blaney	Team Penske	Ford	1:13.599	1:13.427
4	9	Chase Elliott	Hendrick Motorsports	Chevrolet	1:13.345	1:13.430
5	5	Kyle Larson	Hendrick Motorsports	Chevrolet	1:13.449	1:13.445
6	24	William Byron	Hendrick Motorsports	Chevrolet	1:13.551	1:13.463
7	99	Daniel Suárez	Trackhouse Racing	Chevrolet	1:13.475	1:13.467
8	48	Alex Bowman	Hendrick Motorsports	Chevrolet	1:13.410	1:13.537
9	1	Ross Chastain	Trackhouse Racing	Chevrolet	1:13.421	1:13.560
10	54	Ty Gibbs	Joe Gibbs Racing	Toyota	1:13.716	1:13.770
11	16	A. J. Allmendinger (i)	Kaulig Racing	Chevrolet	1:13.488	—
12	34	Michael McDowell	Front Row Motorsports	Ford	1:13.847	—
13	77	Carson Hocevar (R)	Spire Motorsports	Chevrolet	1:13.798	—
14	38	Todd Gilliland	Front Row Motorsports	Ford	1:13.898	—
15	20	Christopher Bell	Joe Gibbs Racing	Toyota	1:13.870	—
16	3	Austin Dillon	Richard Childress Racing	Chevrolet	1:13.986	—
17	7	Corey LaJoie	Spire Motorsports	Chevrolet	1:13.914	—
18	23	Bubba Wallace	23XI Racing	Toyota	1:13.994	—
19	10	Noah Gragson	Stewart-Haas Racing	Ford	1:14.002	—
20	71	Zane Smith (R)	Spire Motorsports	Chevrolet	1:14.005	—
21	19	Martin Truex Jr.	Joe Gibbs Racing	Toyota	1:14.005	—
22	21	Harrison Burton	Wood Brothers Racing	Ford	1:14.045	—
23	14	Chase Briscoe	Stewart-Haas Racing	Ford	1:14.051	—
24	33	Will Brown	Richard Childress Racing	Chevrolet	1:14.045	—
25	11	Denny Hamlin	Joe Gibbs Racing	Toyota	1:14.151	—
26	17	Chris Buescher	RFK Racing	Ford	1:14.092	—
27	51	Justin Haley	Rick Ware Racing	Ford	1:14.196	—
28	2	Austin Cindric	Team Penske	Ford	1:14.226	—
29	8	Kyle Busch	Richard Childress Racing	Chevrolet	1:14.265	—
30	41	Ryan Preece	Stewart-Haas Racing	Ford	1:14.475	—
31	60	Cameron Waters	RFK Racing	Ford	1:14.366	—
32	4	Josh Berry (R)	Stewart-Haas Racing	Ford	1:14.485	—
33	47	Ricky Stenhouse Jr.	JTG Daugherty Racing	Chevrolet	1:14.408	—
34	31	Daniel Hemric	Kaulig Racing	Chevrolet	1:14.549	—
35	6	Brad Keselowski	RFK Racing	Ford	1:14.496	—
36	15	Kaz Grala (R)	Rick Ware Racing	Ford	1:14.883	—
37	42	John Hunter Nemechek	Legacy Motor Club	Toyota	1:14.496	—
38	43	Erik Jones	Legacy Motor Club	Toyota	1:15.205	—
Official qualifying results

== Race ==
Kyle Larson celebrates winning the 2024 Toyota/Save Mart 350.

=== Race results ===
==== Stage results ====
Stage One Laps: 25

Pos	No	Driver	Team	Manufacturer	Points
1	45	Tyler Reddick	23XI Racing	Toyota	10
2	12	Ryan Blaney	Team Penske	Ford	9
3	5	Kyle Larson	Hendrick Motorsports	Chevrolet	8
4	9	Chase Elliott	Hendrick Motorsports	Chevrolet	7
5	48	Alex Bowman	Hendrick Motorsports	Chevrolet	6
6	34	Michael McDowell	Front Row Motorsports	Ford	5
7	1	Ross Chastain	Trackhouse Racing	Chevrolet	4
8	99	Daniel Suárez	Trackhouse Racing	Chevrolet	3
9	7	Corey LaJoie	Spire Motorsports	Chevrolet	2
10	38	Todd Gilliland	Front Row Motorsports	Ford	1
Official stage one results

Stage Two Laps: 30

Pos	No	Driver	Team	Manufacturer	Points
1	17	Chris Buescher	RFK Racing	Ford	10
2	41	Ryan Preece	Stewart-Haas Racing	Ford	9
3	19	Martin Truex Jr.	Joe Gibbs Racing	Toyota	8
4	8	Kyle Busch	Richard Childress Racing	Chevrolet	7
5	16	A. J. Allmendinger (i)	Kaulig Racing	Chevrolet	0
6	6	Brad Keselowski	RFK Racing	Ford	5
7	43	Erik Jones	Leagcy Motor Club	Toyota	4
8	38	Todd Gilliland	Front Row Motorsports	Ford	3
9	22	Joey Logano	Team Penske	Ford	2
10	21	Harrison Burton	Wood Brothers Racing	Ford	1
Official stage two results

=== Final Stage results ===
Stage Three Laps: 55

Pos	Grid	No	Driver	Team	Manufacturer	Laps	Points
1	5	5	Kyle Larson	Hendrick Motorsports	Chevrolet	110	48
2	12	34	Michael McDowell	Front Row Motorsports	Ford	110	40
3	26	17	Chris Buescher	RFK Racing	Ford	110	44
4	4	9	Chase Elliott	Hendrick Motorsports	Chevrolet	110	40
5	9	1	Ross Chastain	Trackhouse Racing	Chevrolet	110	36
6	11	16	A. J. Allmendinger (i)	Kaulig Racing	Chevrolet	110	0
7	3	12	Ryan Blaney	Team Penske	Ford	110	39
8	2	45	Tyler Reddick	23XI Racing	Toyota	110	39
9	15	20	Christopher Bell	Joe Gibbs Racing	Toyota	110	28
10	14	38	Todd Gilliland	Front Row Motorsports	Ford	110	31
11	17	7	Corey LaJoie	Spire Motorsports	Chevrolet	110	28
12	29	8	Kyle Busch	Richard Childress Racing	Chevrolet	110	32
13	35	6	Brad Keselowski	RFK Racing	Ford	110	29
14	7	99	Daniel Suárez	Trackhouse Racing	Chevrolet	110	26
15	8	48	Alex Bowman	Hendrick Motorsports	Chevrolet	110	28
16	20	71	Zane Smith (R)	Spire Motorsports	Chevrolet	110	21
17	13	77	Carson Hocevar (R)	Spire Motorsports	Chevrolet	110	20
18	30	41	Ryan Preece	Stewart-Haas Racing	Ford	110	28
19	38	43	Erik Jones	Legacy Motor Club	Toyota	110	22
20	18	23	Bubba Wallace	23XI Racing	Toyota	110	17
21	1	22	Joey Logano	Team Penske	Ford	110	18
22	28	2	Austin Cindric	Team Penske	Ford	110	15
23	36	15	Kaz Grala (R)	Rick Ware Racing	Ford	110	14
24	33	47	Ricky Stenhouse Jr.	JTG Daugherty Racing	Chevrolet	110	13
25	22	21	Harrison Burton	Wood Brothers Racing	Ford	110	13
26	19	10	Noah Gragson	Stewart-Haas Racing	Ford	110	11
27	21	19	Martin Truex Jr.	Joe Gibbs Racing	Toyota	110	18
28	34	31	Daniel Hemric	Kaulig Racing	Chevrolet	109	9
29	37	42	John Hunter Nemechek	Legacy Motor Club	Toyota	109	8
30	6	24	William Byron	Hendrick Motorsports	Chevrolet	108	7
31	24	33	Will Brown	Richard Childress Racing	Chevrolet	107	6
32	32	4	Josh Berry (R)	Stewart-Haas Racing	Ford	95	5
33	27	51	Justin Haley	Rick Ware Racing	Ford	88	4
34	23	14	Chase Briscoe	Stewart-Haas Racing	Ford	73	3
35	31	60	Cameron Waters	RFK Racing	Ford	66	2
36	16	3	Austin Dillon	Richard Childress Racing	Chevrolet	39	1
37	10	54	Ty Gibbs	Joe Gibbs Racing	Toyota	16	1
38	25	11	Denny Hamlin	Joe Gibbs Racing	Toyota	2	1
Official race results

=== Race statistics ===
- Lead changes: 10 among 8 different drivers
- Cautions/Laps: 9 for 20 laps
- Red flags: 0
- Time of race: 2 hours, 56 minutes, and 14 seconds
- Average speed: 74.526 miles per hour (119.938 km/h)

== Media ==
=== Television ===
Fox NASCAR televised the race in the United States on Fox. Mike Joy was the lap-by-lap announcer, while 2012 Sonoma winner Clint Bowyer and 2017 Sonoma winner Kevin Harvick were the color commentators. Jamie Little, Regan Smith and Josh Sims handled the pit road for the television side. Larry McReynolds provided insight from the Fox Sports studio in Charlotte. This was Fox Sports' last Cup race for their portion of the 2024 season as NBC Sports and USA Network takes over NASCAR broadcasts for the rest of the season.

Fox
Booth announcers	Pit reporters	In-race analyst
Lap-by-lap: Mike Joy; Color-commentator: Clint Bowyer; Color-commentator: Kevin Harvick	Jamie Little; Regan Smith; Josh Sims	Larry McReynolds

=== Radio ===
Radio coverage of the race was broadcast by the Performance Racing Network. PRN's broadcast of the race was also simulcasted on Sirius XM NASCAR Radio. Doug Rice and Mark Garrow announced the race in the booth while the field was racing on the pit straightaway. Doug Turnbull called the race from a stand outside of turn 2 when the field was racing up turns 2, 3 and 3a. Brad Gillie called the race from a stand outside of turn 7a when the field was racing through turns 4a and 7a. Pat Patterson called the race when the field raced thru turns 8 and 9. Rob Albright called the race from a billboard outside turn 11 when the field was racing through turns 10 and 11. Alan Cavanna, Brett McMillan and Wendy Venturini reported from pit lane during the race.

PRN
Booth announcers	Turn announcers	Pit reporters
Lead announcer: Doug Rice; Announcer: Mark Garrow	Turns 2, 3 & 3a: Doug Turnbull; Turns 4a & 7a: Brad Gillie; Turns 8 & 9: Pat Patterson; Turns 10 & 11: Rob Albright	Alan Cavanna; Brett McMillan; Wendy Venturini

== Standings after the race ==
Drivers' Championship standings

	Pos	Driver	Points
1	1	Kyle Larson	561
1	2	Chase Elliott	547 (–14)
2	3	Denny Hamlin	535 (–26)
2	4	Tyler Reddick	512 (–49)
1	5	Martin Truex Jr.	508 (–53)
1	6	William Byron	495 (–66)
2	7	Brad Keselowski	466 (–95)
1	8	Ty Gibbs	466 (–95)
1	9	Christopher Bell	465 (–96)
1	10	Ross Chastain	453 (–108)
1	11	Alex Bowman	445 (–116)
	12	Ryan Blaney	444 (–117)
1	13	Chris Buescher	412 (–149)
1	14	Bubba Wallace	388 (–173)
2	15	Kyle Busch	380 (–181)
	16	Joey Logano	372 (–189)
Official driver's standings

Manufacturers' Championship standings

	Pos	Manufacturer	Points
1	1	Chevrolet	582
1	2	Toyota	574 (–8)
	3	Ford	548 (–34)

- Note: Only the first 16 positions are included for the driver standings.
- . – Driver has clinched a position in the NASCAR Cup Series playoffs.

Previous race: 2024 Enjoy Illinois 300	NASCAR Cup Series; 2024 season	Next race: 2024 Iowa Corn 350
