= 2016 Australian Formula 4 Championship =

Motor racing competition

The 2016 CAMS Australian Formula 4 Championship is the second Australian Formula 4 Championship, a motor racing competition for open-wheel racing cars complying with Formula 4 regulations, which were created by the Fédération Internationale de l'Automobile (FIA) for entry-level open-wheel championships. Teams and drivers are competing in eighteen races at six venues, starting on 1 April and ending on 23 October.

== Teams and drivers ==
The following Australian-registered teams and drivers contested the championship.

Team	No.	Drivers	Status	Events
JRD Development	7	Tyler Everingham	R	All
JRD Development	60	Cody Donald	R	5
Team BRM	23	Brenton Grove	R	All
Team BRM	26	Harry Hayek		3–6
Team BRM	79	Jordan Love		All
Team BRM	91	Josh Denton	R	All
Team BRM	99	Will Brown		All
Dream Motorsport	20	Luis Leeds		3
Dream Motorsport	27	Simon Fallon	R	2–6
Dream Motorsport	51	Josh Conroy	R	2–5
Dream Motorsport	93	Zane Goddard		6
Jordan McGregor Motorsports	44	Jordan McGregor	R	1
AGI Sport	51	Josh Conroy	R	1
AGI Sport	68	Jack Smith	R	All
AGI Sport	97	Nick Rowe		All

Icon	Legend
R	Rookie

== Race calendar and results ==
The calendar expanded for the 2016 season, with the Confederation of Australian Motor Sport choosing to focus on permanent racing venues, rather than temporary street circuits, to better aid the development of young drivers. The season started earlier in the year than in 2015, with the first round at Symmons Plains Raceway in April, while the final round will be held at the Highlands Motorsport Park in New Zealand. The Townsville Street Circuit and Homebush Street Circuit have been removed from the schedule. On February 9, it was announced that Highlands Motorsport Park would be removed from the schedule for cost reasons.

All rounds will support the International V8 Supercars Championship, with the exception of the third round that will be featured within the Shannons Nationals.

Round		Circuit	Date	Pole position	Fastest lap	Winning driver	Winning team
1	R1	Symmons Plains Raceway, Launceston	2 April	Will Brown	Nick Rowe	Brenton Grove	Team BRM
1	R2	Symmons Plains Raceway, Launceston	3 April		Will Brown	Jordan Love	Team BRM
1	R3	Symmons Plains Raceway, Launceston	3 April	Will Brown	Josh Denton	Jordan Love	Team BRM
2	R4	Phillip Island Grand Prix Circuit, Phillip Island	16 April	Nick Rowe	Jordan Love	Jordan Love	Team BRM
2	R5	Phillip Island Grand Prix Circuit, Phillip Island	16 April		Jordan Love	Will Brown	Team BRM
2	R6	Phillip Island Grand Prix Circuit, Phillip Island	17 April	Nick Rowe	Will Brown	Jordan Love	Team BRM
3	R7	Sydney Motorsport Park, Eastern Creek	2 July	Nick Rowe	Nick Rowe	Nick Rowe	AGI Sport
3	R8	Sydney Motorsport Park, Eastern Creek	3 July		Simon Fallon	Will Brown	Team BRM
3	R9	Sydney Motorsport Park, Eastern Creek	3 July	Nick Rowe	Harry Hayek	Luis Leeds	Dream Motorsport
4	R10	Queensland Raceway, Ipswich	23 July	Harry Hayek	Harry Hayek	Harry Hayek	Team BRM
4	R11	Queensland Raceway, Ipswich	23 July		Jordan Love	Will Brown	Team BRM
4	R12	Queensland Raceway, Ipswich	24 July	Harry Hayek	Harry Hayek	Harry Hayek	Team BRM
5	R13	Sandown Raceway, Melbourne	17 September	Jordan Love	Jordan Love	Will Brown	Team BRM
5	R14	Sandown Raceway, Melbourne	17 September		Josh Denton	Josh Denton	Team BRM
5	R15	Sandown Raceway, Melbourne	18 September	Jordan Love	Will Brown	Will Brown	Team BRM
6	R16	Surfers Paradise Street Circuit, Surfers Paradise	22 October	Will Brown	Harry Hayek	Will Brown	Team BRM
6	R17	Surfers Paradise Street Circuit, Surfers Paradise	22 October		Harry Hayek	Simon Fallon	Dream Motorsport
6	R18	Surfers Paradise Street Circuit, Surfers Paradise	23 October	Will Brown	Will Brown	Harry Hayek	Team BRM

== Championship standings ==
Points are awarded to the top 10 classified finishers in each race.

Position	**1st**	**2nd**	**3rd**	**4th**	**5th**	**6th**	**7th**	**8th**	**9th**	**10th**
Points	25	18	15	12	10	8	6	4	2	1

=== Drivers' standings ===
Pos	Driver	SYM			PHI			SMP			QLD			SAN			SUR			Pts.
1	Will Brown	**2**	3	**2**	3	1	2	4	1	5	4	1	2	1	EX	1	**1**	4	**2**	316
2	Nick Rowe	6	2	3	**2**	Ret	**3**	**1**	2	**2**	2	4	3	5	2	2	3	3	3	271
3	Jordan Love	Ret	1	1	1	2	1	10	7	Ret	3	2	4	**2**	3	**3**	5	6	5	246
4	Harry Hayek							2	4	3	**1**	3	**1**	Ret	4	4	2	2	1	195
5	Simon Fallon				4	6	5	8	3	4	7	8	9	6	7	7	4	1	4	142
6	Josh Denton	3	9	4	8	3	4	9	9	9	8	6	5	3	1	Ret	8	7	8	137
7	Tyler Everingham	5	7	9	5	7	8	7	10	6	6	7	8	4	6	8	6	8	6	113
8	Jack Smith	Ret	4	5	7	5	6	5	8	8	5	5	7	8	5	6	Ret	Ret	DNS	107
9	Brenton Grove	1	8	8	9	8	9	11	6	7	Ret	9	6	7	8	5	Ret	Ret	7	93
10	Josh Conroy	7	5	6	6	4	7	6	5	10	Ret	10	10	9	9	Ret				75
11	Luis Leeds							3	Ret	1										40
12	Jordan McGregor	4	6	7																26
13	Zane Goddard																7	5	Ret	16
14	Cody Donald													10	Ret	DNS				1
Pos	Driver	SYM			PHI			SMP			QLD			SAN			SUR			Pts.

Colour	Result
Gold	Winner
Silver	Second place
Bronze	Third place
Green	Points classification
Blue	Non-points classification
Blue	Non-classified finish (NC)
Purple	Retired, not classified (Ret)
Red	Did not qualify (DNQ)
Red	Did not pre-qualify (DNPQ)
Black	Disqualified (DSQ)
White	Did not start (DNS)
White	Withdrew (WD)
White	Race cancelled (C)
Blank	Did not practice (DNP)
Blank	Did not arrive (DNA)
Blank	Excluded (EX)

Bold – Pole
Italics – Fastest lap
