= 2020 Sydney SuperSprint =

Motor racing event

(New South Wales) 2020 Sydney SuperSprint
Event Information
- Round 3 of 11 in the 2020 Supercars Championship
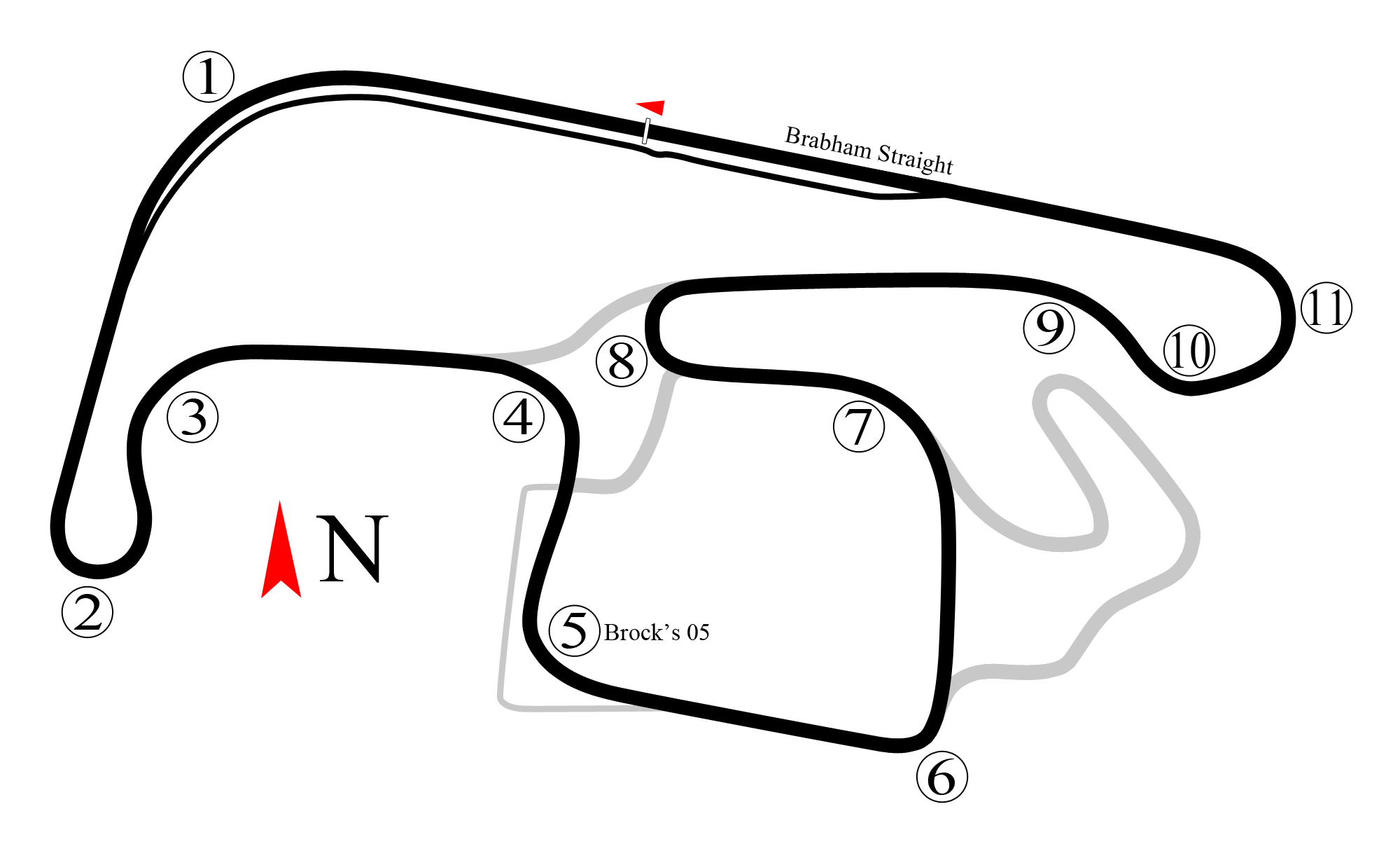
- "Gardner" layout of the Sydney Motorsport Park
- Date: 27–28 June 2020
- Location: Eastern Creek, New South Wales
- Venue: Sydney Motorsport Park
- Weather: Overcast

Results
Race 1
Distance	32 laps	125.760 km
Pole position	(New Zealand) Scott McLaughlin; DJR Team Penske	1:27.9658
Winner	(New Zealand) Scott McLaughlin; DJR Team Penske	49:59.5856
Race 2
Distance	32 laps	125.760 km
Pole position	(Australia) Jamie Whincup; Triple Eight Race Engineering	1:28.0756
Winner	(Australia) Nick Percat; Brad Jones Racing	50:14.1247
Race 3
Distance	32 laps	125.760 km
Pole position	(New Zealand) Scott McLaughlin; DJR Team Penske	1:27.9193
Winner	(New Zealand) Scott McLaughlin; DJR Team Penske	50:20.2679

The 2020 Sydney SuperSprint (known for commercial reasons as the 2020 BP Ultimate Sydney SuperSprint) is a motor racing event for the Supercars Championship held on Saturday 27 June through to Sunday 28 June 2020. The event was held at Sydney Motorsport Park in Eastern Creek, New South Wales. It was the third event of the 2020 Supercars Championship and consisted of three races of 125 kilometres.

It marked the first round of the championship held since the COVID-19 pandemic caused the cancellation of races at the Melbourne 400 in March.

== Results ==
=== Practice ===
Session	Day	Fastest lap					
Session	Day	No.	Driver	Team	Car	Time	Ref.
Rookies	Saturday	2	(Australia) Bryce Fullwood	Walkinshaw Andretti United	Holden Commodore ZB	1:30.5517	
Practice 1	Saturday	97	(New Zealand) Shane van Gisbergen	Triple Eight Race Engineering	Holden Commodore ZB	1:28.9179	
Practice 2	Saturday	88	(Australia) Jamie Whincup	Triple Eight Race Engineering	Holden Commodore ZB	1:28.8314	

=== Race 1 ===
==== Qualifying ====
Pos.	No.	Driver	Team	Car	Q1	Q2	Shootout
1	17	(New Zealand) Scott McLaughlin	DJR Team Penske	Ford Mustang GT		1:28.1578	1:27.9658
2	97	(New Zealand) Shane van Gisbergen	Triple Eight Race Engineering	Holden Commodore ZB		1:28.5578	1:28.1762
3	6	(Australia) Cam Waters	Tickford Racing	Ford Mustang GT		1:28.9283	1:28.2602
4	25	(Australia) Chaz Mostert	Walkinshaw Andretti United	Holden Commodore ZB		1:28.6303	1:28.2856
5	88	(Australia) Jamie Whincup	Triple Eight Race Engineering	Holden Commodore ZB		1:28.3397	1:28.2929
6	8	(Australia) Nick Percat	Brad Jones Racing	Holden Commodore ZB		1:28.8724	1:28.3453
7	5	(Australia) Lee Holdsworth	Tickford Racing	Ford Mustang GT		1:28.8772	1:28.3859
8	20	(Australia) Scott Pye	Team 18	Holden Commodore ZB		1:28.5028	1:28.3955
9	99	(Australia) Anton de Pasquale	Erebus Motorsport	Holden Commodore ZB		1:28.6347	1:28.4661
10	12	(New Zealand) Fabian Coulthard	DJR Team Penske	Ford Mustang GT		1:28.4469	1:28.4978
11	2	(Australia) Bryce Fullwood	Walkinshaw Andretti United	Holden Commodore ZB		1:28.5955	1:28.7151
12	14	(Australia) Todd Hazelwood	Brad Jones Racing	Holden Commodore ZB		1:28.4666	1:29.1326
13	18	(Australia) Mark Winterbottom	Team 18	Holden Commodore ZB		1:28.6059	1:29.2308
14	3	(Australia) Macauley Jones	Tim Blanchard Racing	Holden Commodore ZB		1:28.9238	1:29.3590
15	15	(Australia) Rick Kelly	Kelly Racing	Ford Mustang GT		1:29.0678	DSQ
16	7	(New Zealand) Andre Heimgartner	Kelly Racing	Ford Mustang GT		1:29.0708	
17	55	(Australia) Jack Le Brocq	Tickford Racing	Ford Mustang GT		1:29.0768	
18	9	(Australia) David Reynolds	Erebus Motorsport	Holden Commodore ZB		1:29.0772	
19	19	(Australia) Alex Davison	Team Sydney by Tekno	Holden Commodore ZB		1:29.1657	
20	35	(Australia) Garry Jacobson	Matt Stone Racing	Holden Commodore ZB		1:29.4033	
21	44	(Australia) James Courtney	Tickford Racing	Ford Mustang GT	1:29.5693		
22	22	(New Zealand) Chris Pither	Team Sydney by Tekno	Holden Commodore ZB	1:29.5918		
23	4	(Australia) Jack Smith	Brad Jones Racing	Holden Commodore ZB	1:29.8298		
24	34	(Australia) Jake Kostecki	Matt Stone Racing	Holden Commodore ZB	1:29.8950		

==== Race ====
Pos	No.	Driver	Team	Car	Laps	Time / Retired	Grid	Points
1	17	(New Zealand) Scott McLaughlin	DJR Team Penske	Ford Mustang GT	32	49:59.5856	1	150
2	97	(New Zealand) Shane van Gisbergen	Triple Eight Race Engineering	Holden Commodore ZB	32	+0.1876	2	138
3	88	(Australia) Jamie Whincup	Triple Eight Race Engineering	Holden Commodore ZB	32	+9.7752	5	129
4	25	(Australia) Chaz Mostert	Walkinshaw Andretti United	Holden Commodore ZB	32	+11.0759	4	120
5	8	(Australia) Nick Percat	Brad Jones Racing	Holden Commodore ZB	32	+28.3285	6	111
6	6	(Australia) Cam Waters	Tickford Racing	Ford Mustang GT	32	+30.7987	3	102
7	5	(Australia) Lee Holdsworth	Tickford Racing	Ford Mustang GT	32	+31.7553	7	96
8	99	(Australia) Anton de Pasquale	Erebus Motorsport	Holden Commodore ZB	32	+31.7839	9	90
9	18	(Australia) Mark Winterbottom	Team 18	Holden Commodore ZB	32	+32.6706	13	84
10	12	(New Zealand) Fabian Coulthard	DJR Team Penske	Ford Mustang GT	32	+35.2387	10	78
11	14	(Australia) Todd Hazelwood	Brad Jones Racing	Holden Commodore ZB	32	+36.2808	12	72
12	44	(Australia) James Courtney	Tickford Racing	Ford Mustang GT	32	+43.9808	21	69
13	2	(Australia) Bryce Fullwood	Walkinshaw Andretti United	Holden Commodore ZB	32	+43.9900	11	66
14	15	(Australia) Rick Kelly	Kelly Racing	Ford Mustang GT	32	+48.2832	15	63
15	7	(New Zealand) Andre Heimgartner	Kelly Racing	Ford Mustang GT	32	+48.4393	16	60
16	35	(Australia) Garry Jacobson	Matt Stone Racing	Holden Commodore ZB	32	+50.8443	20	57
17	20	(Australia) Scott Pye	Team 18	Holden Commodore ZB	32	+51.0596	8	54
18	3	(Australia) Macauley Jones	Tim Blanchard Racing	Holden Commodore ZB	32	+51.4099	14	51
19	55	(Australia) Jack Le Brocq	Tickford Racing	Ford Mustang GT	32	+51.8890	17	48
20	22	(New Zealand) Chris Pither	Team Sydney by Tekno	Holden Commodore ZB	32	+1:02.0354	22	45
21	9	(Australia) David Reynolds	Erebus Motorsport	Holden Commodore ZB	32	+1:22.3834	18	42
22	34	(Australia) Jake Kostecki	Matt Stone Racing	Holden Commodore ZB	32	+1:24.1708	24	39
23	4	(Australia) Jack Smith	Brad Jones Racing	Holden Commodore ZB	31	+1 Lap	23	36
Ret	19	(Australia) Alex Davison	Team Sydney by Tekno	Holden Commodore ZB	12	Steering	19	
Fastest lap: Chaz Mostert (Walkinshaw Andretti United), 1:30.1171

=== Race 2 ===
==== Qualifying ====
Pos.	No.	Driver	Team	Car	Time
1	88	(Australia) Jamie Whincup	Triple Eight Race Engineering	Holden Commodore ZB	1:28.0756
2	97	(New Zealand) Shane van Gisbergen	Triple Eight Race Engineering	Holden Commodore ZB	+0.0120
3	17	(New Zealand) Scott McLaughlin	DJR Team Penske	Ford Mustang GT	+0.0648
4	12	(New Zealand) Fabian Coulthard	DJR Team Penske	Ford Mustang GT	+0.4790
5	6	(Australia) Cam Waters	Tickford Racing	Ford Mustang GT	+0.5408
6	8	(Australia) Nick Percat	Brad Jones Racing	Holden Commodore ZB	+0.5696
7	25	(Australia) Chaz Mostert	Walkinshaw Andretti United	Holden Commodore ZB	+0.5816
8	55	(Australia) Jack Le Brocq	Tickford Racing	Ford Mustang GT	+0.7857
9	7	(New Zealand) Andre Heimgartner	Kelly Racing	Ford Mustang GT	+0.8785
10	9	(Australia) David Reynolds	Erebus Motorsport	Holden Commodore ZB	+0.8967
11	99	(Australia) Anton de Pasquale	Erebus Motorsport	Holden Commodore ZB	+0.9048
12	18	(Australia) Mark Winterbottom	Team 18	Holden Commodore ZB	+0.9061
13	5	(Australia) Lee Holdsworth	Tickford Racing	Ford Mustang GT	+0.9133
14	2	(Australia) Bryce Fullwood	Walkinshaw Andretti United	Holden Commodore ZB	+0.9381
15	44	(Australia) James Courtney	Tickford Racing	Ford Mustang GT	+0.9562
16	15	(Australia) Rick Kelly	Kelly Racing	Ford Mustang GT	+0.9648
17	20	(Australia) Scott Pye	Team 18	Holden Commodore ZB	+0.9824
18	14	(Australia) Todd Hazelwood	Brad Jones Racing	Holden Commodore ZB	+1.0063
19	3	(Australia) Macauley Jones	Tim Blanchard Racing	Holden Commodore ZB	+1.1131
20	19	(Australia) Alex Davison	Team Sydney by Tekno	Holden Commodore ZB	+1.4050
21	22	(New Zealand) Chris Pither	Team Sydney by Tekno	Holden Commodore ZB	+1.4443
22	35	(Australia) Garry Jacobson	Matt Stone Racing	Holden Commodore ZB	+1.7223
23	34	(Australia) Jake Kostecki	Matt Stone Racing	Holden Commodore ZB	+2.0465
24	4	(Australia) Jack Smith	Brad Jones Racing	Holden Commodore ZB	+5.4917

==== Race ====
Pos	No.	Driver	Team	Car	Laps	Time / Retired	Grid	Points
1	8	(Australia) Nick Percat	Brad Jones Racing	Holden Commodore ZB	32	50:14.1247	6	150
2	88	(Australia) Jamie Whincup	Triple Eight Race Engineering	Holden Commodore ZB	32	+3.1812	1	138
3	17	(New Zealand) Scott McLaughlin	DJR Team Penske	Ford Mustang GT	32	+16.4469	3	129
4	25	(Australia) Chaz Mostert	Walkinshaw Andretti United	Holden Commodore ZB	32	+19.7689	7	120
5	9	(Australia) David Reynolds	Erebus Motorsport	Holden Commodore ZB	32	+21.9624	10	111
6	6	(Australia) Cam Waters	Tickford Racing	Ford Mustang GT	32	+23.0463	5	102
7	97	(New Zealand) Shane van Gisbergen	Triple Eight Race Engineering	Holden Commodore ZB	32	+23.5025	2	96
8	18	(Australia) Mark Winterbottom	Team 18	Holden Commodore ZB	32	+24.3723	12	90
9	44	(Australia) James Courtney	Tickford Racing	Ford Mustang GT	32	+28.9836	15	84
10	7	(New Zealand) Andre Heimgartner	Kelly Racing	Ford Mustang GT	32	+33.5698	9	78
11	20	(Australia) Scott Pye	Team 18	Holden Commodore ZB	32	+37.5956	17	72
12	99	(Australia) Anton de Pasquale	Erebus Motorsport	Holden Commodore ZB	32	+38.5262	11	69
13	5	(Australia) Lee Holdsworth	Tickford Racing	Ford Mustang GT	32	+39.1810	13	66
14	55	(Australia) Jack Le Brocq	Tickford Racing	Ford Mustang GT	32	+39.3618	8	63
15	12	(New Zealand) Fabian Coulthard	DJR Team Penske	Ford Mustang GT	32	+43.0116	4	60
16	3	(Australia) Macauley Jones	Tim Blanchard Racing	Holden Commodore ZB	32	+49.8575	19	57
17	19	(Australia) Alex Davison	Team Sydney by Tekno	Holden Commodore ZB	32	+53.3121	20	54
18	14	(Australia) Todd Hazelwood	Brad Jones Racing	Holden Commodore ZB	32	+54.0598	18	51
19	15	(Australia) Rick Kelly	Kelly Racing	Ford Mustang GT	32	+56.8018	16	48
20	2	(Australia) Bryce Fullwood	Walkinshaw Andretti United	Holden Commodore ZB	32	+57.5818	14	45
21	35	(Australia) Garry Jacobson	Matt Stone Racing	Holden Commodore ZB	32	+1:00.1213	22	42
22	22	(New Zealand) Chris Pither	Team Sydney by Tekno	Holden Commodore ZB	32	+1:05.8370	21	39
23	4	(Australia) Jack Smith	Brad Jones Racing	Holden Commodore ZB	32	+1:13.7965	24	36
24	34	(Australia) Jake Kostecki	Matt Stone Racing	Holden Commodore ZB	31	+1 Lap	23	33
Fastest lap: David Reynolds (Erebus Motorsport), 1:30.3394

=== Race 3 ===
==== Qualifying ====
Pos.	No.	Driver	Team	Car	Time
1	17	(New Zealand) Scott McLaughlin	DJR Team Penske	Ford Mustang GT	1:27.9193
2	88	(Australia) Jamie Whincup	Triple Eight Race Engineering	Holden Commodore ZB	+0.0926
3	97	(New Zealand) Shane van Gisbergen	Triple Eight Race Engineering	Holden Commodore ZB	+0.2044
4	5	(Australia) Lee Holdsworth	Tickford Racing	Ford Mustang GT	+0.4918
5	14	(Australia) Todd Hazelwood	Brad Jones Racing	Holden Commodore ZB	+0.5220
6	6	(Australia) Cam Waters	Tickford Racing	Ford Mustang GT	+0.5264
7	12	(New Zealand) Fabian Coulthard	DJR Team Penske	Ford Mustang GT	+0.5452
8	8	(Australia) Nick Percat	Brad Jones Racing	Holden Commodore ZB	+0.5769
9	9	(Australia) David Reynolds	Erebus Motorsport	Holden Commodore ZB	+0.6441
10	2	(Australia) Bryce Fullwood	Walkinshaw Andretti United	Holden Commodore ZB	+0.7204
11	18	(Australia) Mark Winterbottom	Team 18	Holden Commodore ZB	+0.7396
12	55	(Australia) Jack Le Brocq	Tickford Racing	Ford Mustang GT	+0.7565
13	7	(New Zealand) Andre Heimgartner	Kelly Racing	Ford Mustang GT	+0.7700
14	99	(Australia) Anton de Pasquale	Erebus Motorsport	Holden Commodore ZB	+0.7807
15	25	(Australia) Chaz Mostert	Walkinshaw Andretti United	Holden Commodore ZB	+0.8189
16	20	(Australia) Scott Pye	Team 18	Holden Commodore ZB	+0.9816
17	15	(Australia) Rick Kelly	Kelly Racing	Ford Mustang GT	+0.9909
18	44	(Australia) James Courtney	Tickford Racing	Ford Mustang GT	+1.0934
19	3	(Australia) Macauley Jones	Tim Blanchard Racing	Holden Commodore ZB	+1.1123
20	19	(Australia) Alex Davison	Team Sydney by Tekno	Holden Commodore ZB	+1.2439
21	35	(Australia) Garry Jacobson	Matt Stone Racing	Holden Commodore ZB	+1.4097
22	34	(Australia) Jake Kostecki	Matt Stone Racing	Holden Commodore ZB	+1.4573
23	4	(Australia) Jack Smith	Brad Jones Racing	Holden Commodore ZB	+1.8612
24	22	(New Zealand) Chris Pither	Team Sydney by Tekno	Holden Commodore ZB	+7:16.9774

==== Race ====
Pos	No.	Driver	Team	Car	Laps	Time / Retired	Grid	Points
1	17	(New Zealand) Scott McLaughlin	DJR Team Penske	Ford Mustang GT	32	50:20.2679	1	150
2	5	(Australia) Lee Holdsworth	Tickford Racing	Ford Mustang GT	32	+1.5195	4	138
3	88	(Australia) Jamie Whincup	Triple Eight Race Engineering	Holden Commodore ZB	32	+11.2507	2	129
4	9	(Australia) David Reynolds	Erebus Motorsport	Holden Commodore ZB	32	+24.4283	9	120
5	18	(Australia) Mark Winterbottom	Team 18	Holden Commodore ZB	32	+25.6472	11	111
6	97	(New Zealand) Shane van Gisbergen	Triple Eight Race Engineering	Holden Commodore ZB	32	+26.5172	3	102
7	99	(Australia) Anton de Pasquale	Erebus Motorsport	Holden Commodore ZB	32	+26.9496	14	96
8	14	(Australia) Todd Hazelwood	Brad Jones Racing	Holden Commodore ZB	32	+27.1287	5	90
9	8	(Australia) Nick Percat	Brad Jones Racing	Holden Commodore ZB	32	+27.9970	8	84
10	2	(Australia) Bryce Fullwood	Walkinshaw Andretti United	Holden Commodore ZB	32	+28.7487	10	78
11	55	(Australia) Jack Le Brocq	Tickford Racing	Ford Mustang GT	32	+31.8589	12	72
12	20	(Australia) Scott Pye	Team 18	Holden Commodore ZB	32	+35.6474	16	69
13	6	(Australia) Cam Waters	Tickford Racing	Ford Mustang GT	32	+36.8594	6	66
14	44	(Australia) James Courtney	Tickford Racing	Ford Mustang GT	32	+37.4617	18	63
15	7	(New Zealand) Andre Heimgartner	Kelly Racing	Ford Mustang GT	32	+40.6226	13	60
16	25	(Australia) Chaz Mostert	Walkinshaw Andretti United	Holden Commodore ZB	32	+43.7544	15	57
17	15	(Australia) Rick Kelly	Kelly Racing	Ford Mustang GT	32	+46.6571	17	54
18	4	(Australia) Jack Smith	Brad Jones Racing	Holden Commodore ZB	32	+47.0153	23	51
19	35	(Australia) Garry Jacobson	Matt Stone Racing	Holden Commodore ZB	32	+48.0625	21	48
20	3	(Australia) Macauley Jones	Tim Blanchard Racing	Holden Commodore ZB	32	+49.3996	19	45
21	19	(Australia) Alex Davison	Team Sydney by Tekno	Holden Commodore ZB	32	+49.8291	20	42
22	34	(Australia) Jake Kostecki	Matt Stone Racing	Holden Commodore ZB	32	+50.5962	22	39
23	22	(New Zealand) Chris Pither	Team Sydney by Tekno	Holden Commodore ZB	32	+1:17.3827	24	36
Ret	12	(New Zealand) Fabian Coulthard	DJR Team Penske	Ford Mustang GT	31	Differential	7	
Fastest lap: Bryce Fullwood (Walkinshaw Andretti United), 1:30.7251
