= 2023 Supercars Championship =

Motor racing competition

The 2023 Supercars Championship (known for commercial reasons as the 2023 Repco Supercars Championship) was a motor racing series for Supercars.

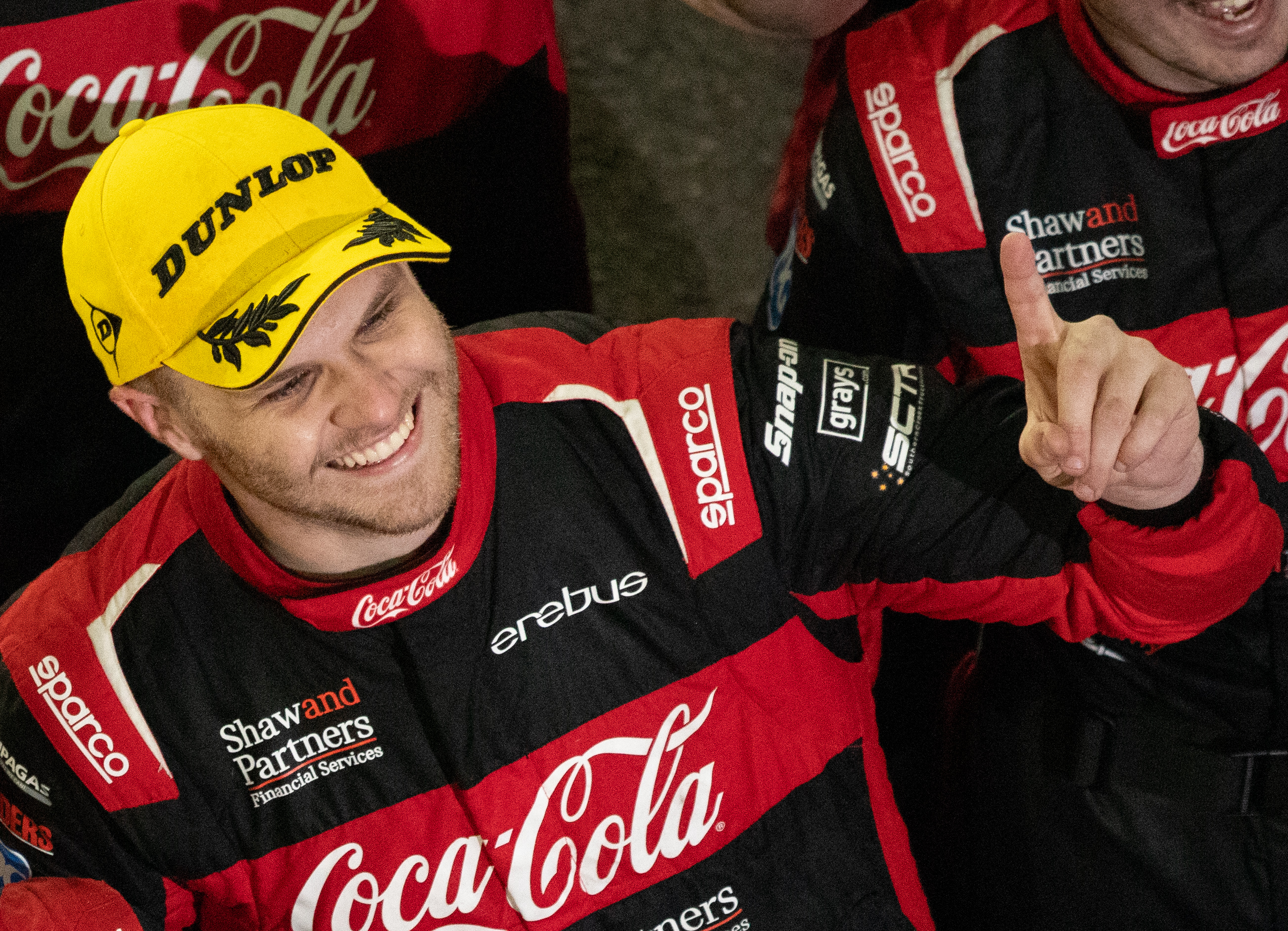
Brodie Kostecki won his first drivers' championship

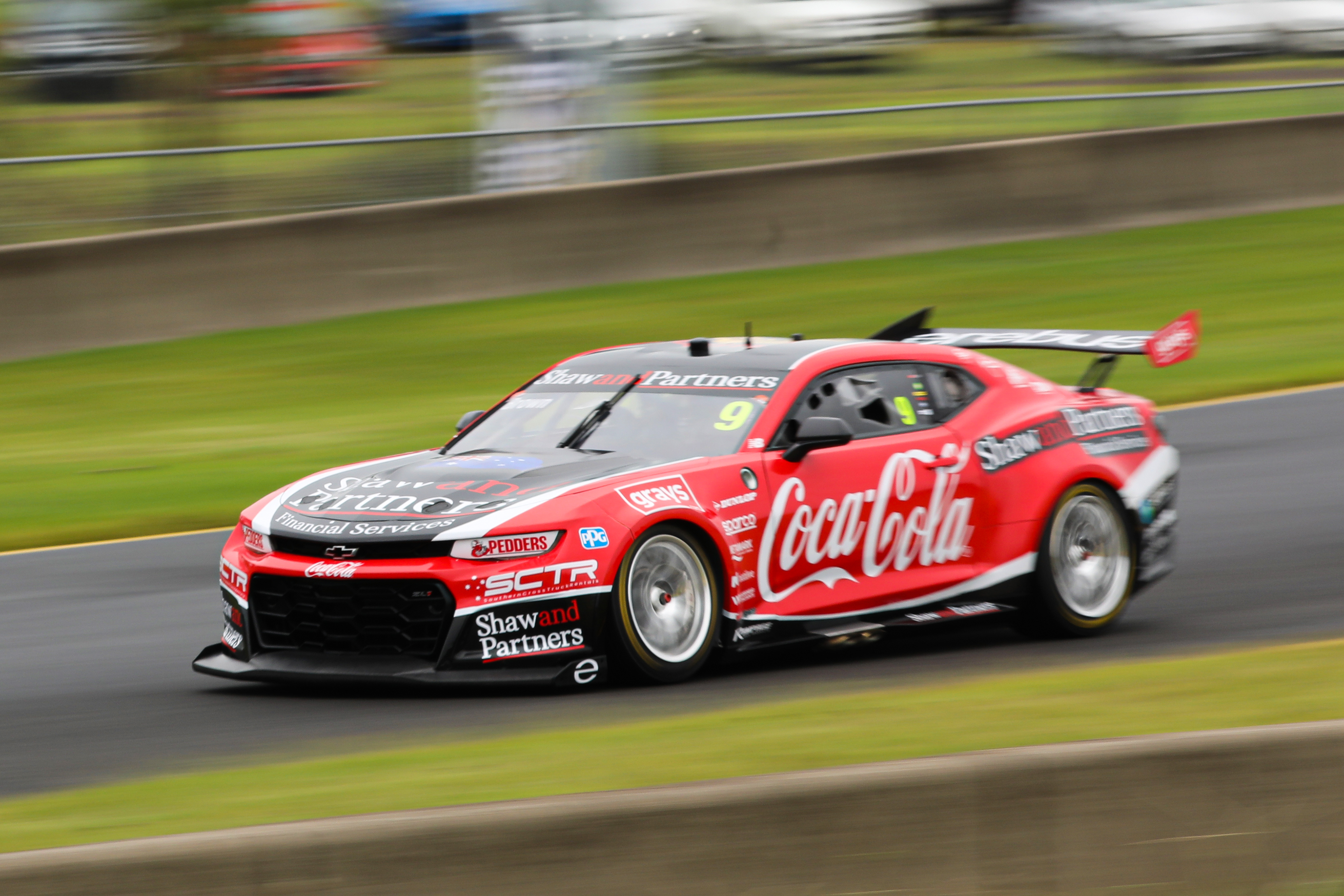
Erebus Motorsport won their first Teams' Championship

It was the twenty-fifth running of the Supercars Championship and the twenty-seventh series in which Supercars have contested the Australian Touring Car Championship, the premier title in Australian motorsport. It was the sixty-fourth season of touring car racing in Australia.

The 2023 season saw the introduction of Gen3, a revision to the sport's technical regulations. These regulations were designed to cut costs for competitors by introducing more standardised components to the cars and redesigning the chassis to favour coupé body shapes.

Brodie Kostecki and Erebus Motorsport secured their first Drivers' and Teams' Champions respectively.

== Teams and drivers ==
The following teams and drivers competed in the 2023 championship.

Championship entries						Endurance entries	
Manufacturer	Model	Team	No.	Driver name	Rounds	Co-driver name	Rounds
Chevrolet	Camaro Mk.6	Brad Jones Racing	4	(Australia) Jack Smith	All	(New Zealand) Jaxon Evans	9–10
Chevrolet	Camaro Mk.6	Brad Jones Racing	8	(New Zealand) Andre Heimgartner	All	(Australia) Dale Wood	9–10
Chevrolet	Camaro Mk.6	Brad Jones Racing	14	(Australia) Bryce Fullwood	All	(Australia) Dean Fiore	9–10
Chevrolet	Camaro Mk.6	Brad Jones Racing	96	(Australia) Macauley Jones	All	(Australia) Jordan Boys	9–10
Chevrolet	Camaro Mk.6	Erebus Motorsport	9	(Australia) Will Brown	All	(Australia) Jack Perkins	9–10
Chevrolet	Camaro Mk.6	Erebus Motorsport	99	(Australia) Brodie Kostecki	All	(Australia) David Russell	9–10
Chevrolet	Camaro Mk.6	Team 18	18	(Australia) Mark Winterbottom	All	(Australia) Michael Caruso	9–10
Chevrolet	Camaro Mk.6	Team 18	20	(Australia) Scott Pye	All	(Australia) Warren Luff	9–10
Chevrolet	Camaro Mk.6	PremiAir Racing	23	(Australia) Tim Slade	All	(Australia) Jonathon Webb	9–10
Chevrolet	Camaro Mk.6	PremiAir Racing	31	(Australia) James Golding	All	(Australia) Dylan O'Keeffe	9–10
Chevrolet	Camaro Mk.6	Matt Stone Racing	34	(Australia) Jack Le Brocq	All	(Australia) Jayden Ojeda	9–10
Chevrolet	Camaro Mk.6	Matt Stone Racing	35	(Australia) Cameron Hill	All	(Australia) Jaylyn Robotham	9–10
Chevrolet	Camaro Mk.6	Triple Eight Race Engineering	88	(Australia) Broc Feeney	All	(Australia) Jamie Whincup	9–10
Chevrolet	Camaro Mk.6	Triple Eight Race Engineering	97	(New Zealand) Shane van Gisbergen	All	(New Zealand) Richie Stanaway	9–10
Ford	Mustang GT	Walkinshaw Andretti United	2	(Australia) Nick Percat	All	(New Zealand) Fabian Coulthard	9–10
Ford	Mustang GT	Walkinshaw Andretti United	25	(Australia) Chaz Mostert	All	(Australia) Lee Holdsworth	9–10
Ford	Mustang GT	Blanchard Racing Team	3	(Australia) Todd Hazelwood	All	(Australia) Tim Blanchard	9–10
Ford	Mustang GT	Tickford Racing	5	(Australia) James Courtney	All	(Australia) Zak Best	9–10
Ford	Mustang GT	Tickford Racing	6	(Australia) Cam Waters	All	(Australia) James Moffat	9–10
Ford	Mustang GT	Tickford Racing	55	(Australia) Thomas Randle	All	(Australia) Garry Jacobson	9–10
Ford	Mustang GT	Tickford Racing	56	(Australia) Declan Fraser	All	(Australia) Tyler Everingham	9–10
Ford	Mustang GT	Dick Johnson Racing	11	(Australia) Anton de Pasquale	All	(Australia) Tony D'Alberto	9–10
Ford	Mustang GT	Dick Johnson Racing	17	(Australia) Will Davison	All	(Australia) Alex Davison	9–10
Ford	Mustang GT	Grove Racing	19	(New Zealand) Matt Payne	All	(France) Kévin Estre	9–10
Ford	Mustang GT	Grove Racing	26	(Australia) David Reynolds	All	(Australia) Garth Tander	9–10
Wildcard entries
Chevrolet	Camaro Mk.6	Triple Eight Race Engineering	888	(Australia) Zane Goddard	5, 9–10	(Australia) Craig Lowndes	9–10
Ford	Mustang GT	Blanchard Racing Team	7	—N/a		(Australia) Jake Kostecki (Australia) Aaron Love	9–10
Ford	Mustang GT	Dick Johnson Racing	98	—N/a		(Australia) Kai Allen (Switzerland) Simona de Silvestro	10

=== Manufacturer changes ===
Chevrolet returned to the series for the first time since 1984, replacing Holden and the ZB Commodore with the Camaro Mk.6.

All Ford teams upgraded to the Mustang GT S650.

=== Team changes ===
Walkinshaw Andretti United switched from Holden to Ford. In addition, Walkinshaw Andretti United is receiving the same treatment as Dick Johnson Racing, Tickford Racing, Blanchard Racing Team and Grove Racing by receiving factory support from Ford Performance.

=== Driver changes ===
Cameron Hill graduated from the Super2 Series to race full time at Matt Stone Racing. Hill replaced Todd Hazelwood, who joined Blanchard Racing Team, replacing Tim Slade. Slade then joined PremiAir Racing to replace Chris Pither.

Declan Fraser also graduated from the Super2 Series to replace Jake Kostecki after Tickford Racing terminated Kostecki's contract early. Kostecki was initially contracted to race with the team throughout 2023.

Matt Payne joined Grove Racing, graduating from the Super2 Series. He replaced Lee Holdsworth, who announced his retirement from full-time competition at the end of the 2022 season.

=== Wildcard entries ===
Three wildcard entries were granted. Triple Eight Race Engineering ran a third car for Zane Goddard at the Darwin Triple Crown, which was then used for him to pair up with Craig Lowndes for the Sandown 500 and Bathurst 1000.

Blanchard Racing Team entered a second car at the endurance events for Jake Kostecki and Aaron Love. Similarly, Dick Johnson Racing entered a third car for Kai Allen and Simona De Silvestro at the Bathurst 1000.

== Calendar ==
Twelve, down from thirteen in 2022, circuits are hosted a round of the 2023 championship.

Round	Event	Circuit	Location	Dates	Map
1	Newcastle 500	(New South Wales) Newcastle Street Circuit	Newcastle, New South Wales	11–12 March	2023 Supercars Championship is located in Australia
2	Melbourne SuperSprint	(Victoria (state)) Albert Park Circuit	Albert Park, Victoria	30 March–2 April	2023 Supercars Championship is located in Australia
3	Perth SuperSprint	(Western Australia) Wanneroo Raceway	Neerabup, Western Australia	29–30 April	2023 Supercars Championship is located in Australia
4	Tasmania SuperSprint	(Tasmania) Symmons Plains Raceway	Launceston, Tasmania	20–21 May	2023 Supercars Championship is located in Australia
5	Darwin Triple Crown	(Northern Territory) Hidden Valley Raceway	Darwin, Northern Territory	17–18 June	2023 Supercars Championship is located in Australia
6	Townsville 500	(Queensland) Reid Park Street Circuit	Townsville, Queensland	8–9 July	2023 Supercars Championship is located in Australia
7	Sydney SuperNight	(New South Wales) Sydney Motorsport Park	Eastern Creek, New South Wales	29–30 July	2023 Supercars Championship is located in Australia
8	The Bend SuperSprint	(South Australia) The Bend Motorsport Park	Tailem Bend, South Australia	19–20 August	2023 Supercars Championship is located in Australia
9	Sandown 500	(Victoria (state)) Sandown Raceway	Springvale, Victoria	15–17 September	2023 Supercars Championship is located in Australia
10	Bathurst 1000	(New South Wales) Mount Panorama Circuit	Bathurst, New South Wales	5–8 October	2023 Supercars Championship is located in Australia
11	Gold Coast 500	(Queensland) Surfers Paradise Street Circuit	Surfers Paradise, Queensland	28–29 October	2023 Supercars Championship is located in Australia
12	Adelaide 500	(South Australia) Adelaide Street Circuit	Adelaide, South Australia	25–26 November	2023 Supercars Championship is located in Australia

=== Calendar changes ===
The Newcastle 500 returned as the season opener, after a three-year absence due to the COVID-19 pandemic.

The Melbourne 400 and Perth SuperNight reverted to a SuperSprint format.

The Sandown 500 returned to the calendar for the first time since 2019, and the first as the precursor to the Bathurst 1000 since 2018.

Pukekohe Park Raceway closed, citing the focus on horse racing and club facilities: a new venue in New Zealand was unable to be secured for 2023.

The Winton SuperSprint was omitted from the calendar.

== Rule changes ==
=== Gen3 ===
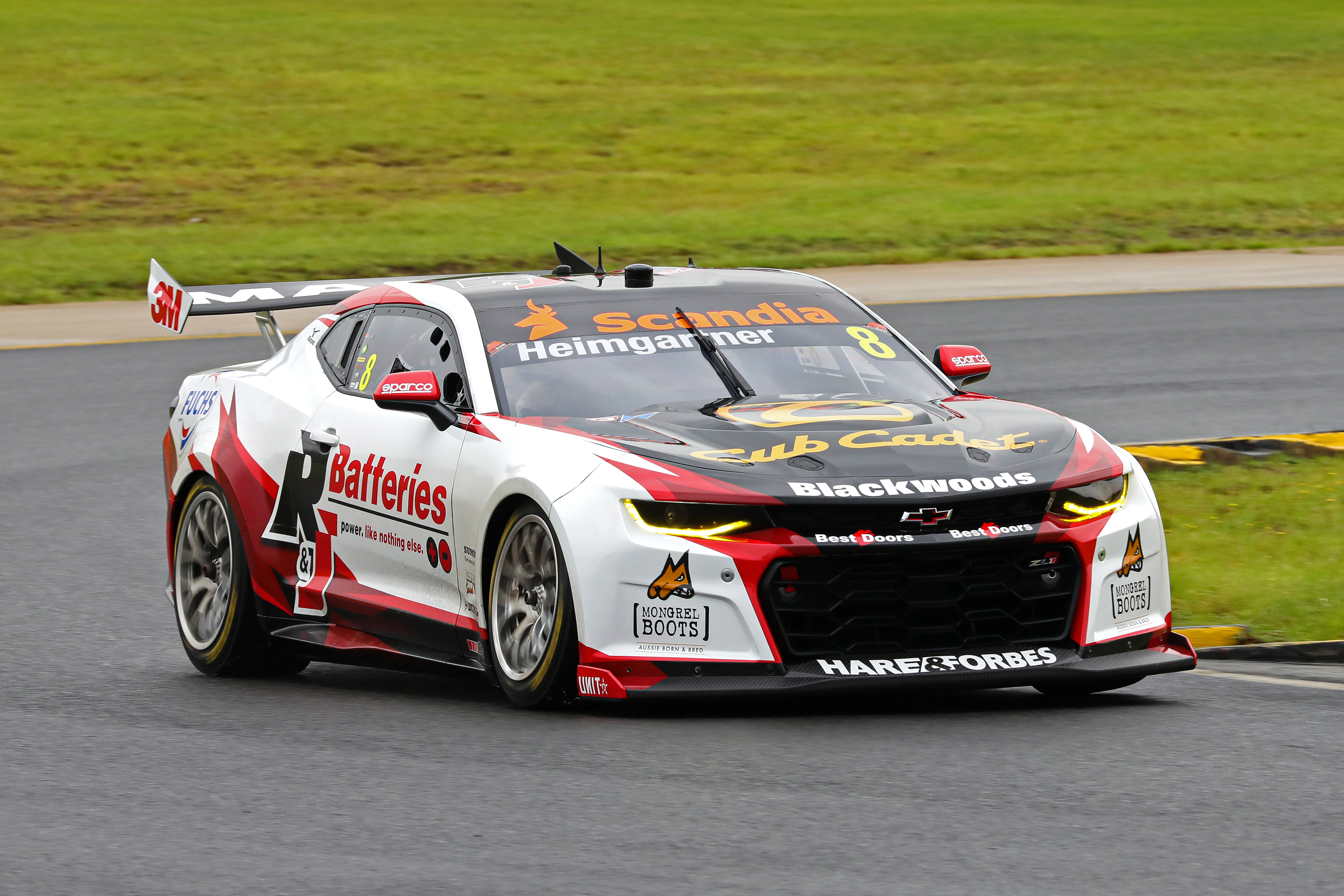

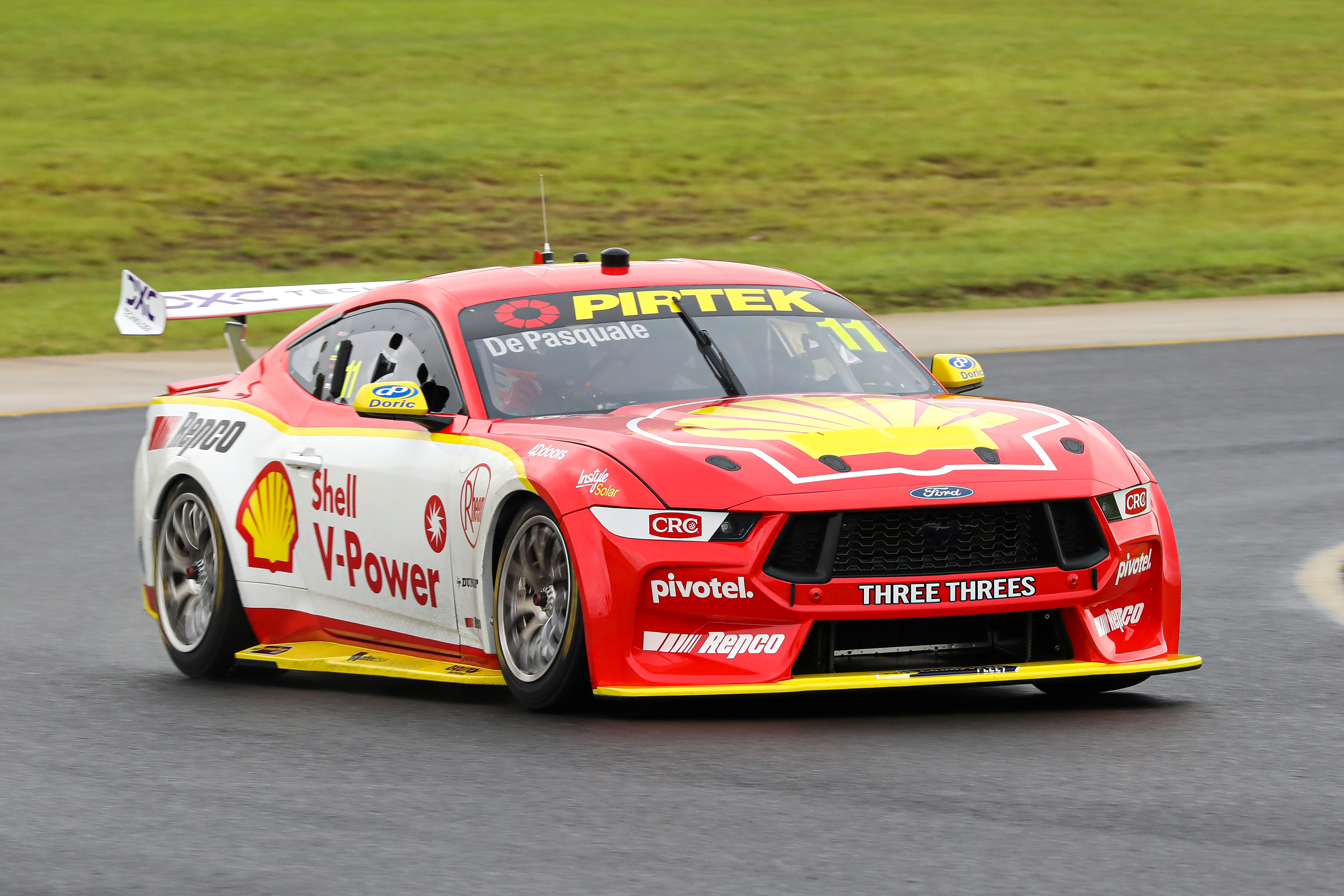
The Gen3 regulations saw the introduction of the Chevrolet Camaro ZL1 (top) and Ford Mustang S650 (bottom).

Gen3 made its debut, replacing the Car of the Future regulations that débuted in 2013, with regulations designed to lower costs of a standard Supercar. It was due to debut midway through 2022, but due to ongoing challenges with international supply chains and domestic disruptions caused by the COVID-19 pandemic, it was delayed to 2023.

The regulations introduced more controlled components into the cars to address the rising costs of maintaining a car. The pedal kit, brake kit and wheels became control components, with tenders needing the rims to be 'finger friendly' for pit crew during a pit stop. The roll cage lowered by 100mm to be suited to coupes, after the controversy surrounding the Ford Mustang GT, which required the roof to be stretched beyond the dimensions of its road-going counterpart to fit the Car of the Future chassis. Supercars manufactured the roll cage in kit form for teams that do not have the budget to build one themselves.

The engines on Gen3 were overhauled, with pushrod engines replaced with fuel-injected, V8 engines, with the Camaro running a 5.7 Litre LTR V8, while the Mustang will run a 5.4 Litre Coyote V8. This is intended to modernise the engine and significantly reduce costs of building and maintaining them.

Aerodynamic downforce was cut by 67% to encourage closer racing and easier overtaking after complaints from drivers about dirty air and aerowash from current Gen2 cars.

Minimum weight was decreased from 1,400 kg to 1,335 kg, with a 95 kg minimum of driver and seat weight combination. Later, it was increased to 1,340 kg from the Sandown 500.

Triple Eight Race Engineering oversaw the development of the Chevrolet Camaro ZL1 as a replacement for the Holden ZB Commodore. The Camaro ZL1 was chosen after parent company General Motors decided to discontinue the Holden brand and shut down production of the Commodore. Dick Johnson Racing oversaw the development of the S650 Mustang.

=== Other changes ===
A new E75 fuel blend was introduced, down from E85 that was used from 2009, while utilising more renewable bio fuels to lower carbon emissions.

Ahead of the Perth SuperSprint an LED display was added to the windscreen to show information such as a driver's position in the race, practice, or qualifying session to spectators.

Ahead of the Gold Coast 500 a Full Course Yellow system was implemented, although the system saw no use during the event itself.

== Results and standings ==
=== Season summary ===
Round	Race	Event	Pole position	Fastest lap	Winning driver	Winning team	Report
1	1	Newcastle 500	(Australia) Brodie Kostecki	(Australia) Chaz Mostert	(Australia) Cam Waters (Note: Cam Waters crossed the line in 3rd, but he was credited with the win after the cars of Shane van Gisbergen and Broc Feeney were disqualified after a protest lodged by Tickford Racing and Walkinshaw Andretti United related to the use of dry ice in a specific banned location.)	Tickford Racing	Report
1	2	Newcastle 500	(Australia) David Reynolds	(New Zealand) Shane van Gisbergen	(New Zealand) Shane van Gisbergen	Triple Eight Race Engineering	Report
2	3	Melbourne SuperSprint	(Australia) Anton de Pasquale	(Australia) Broc Feeney	(New Zealand) Shane van Gisbergen	Triple Eight Race Engineering	Report
2	4	Melbourne SuperSprint	(New Zealand) Shane van Gisbergen	(Australia) Scott Pye	(Australia) Brodie Kostecki	Erebus Motorsport	Report
2	5	Melbourne SuperSprint	(Australia) Brodie Kostecki	(New Zealand) Shane van Gisbergen	(Australia) Brodie Kostecki	Erebus Motorsport	Report
2	6	Melbourne SuperSprint	(Australia) Broc Feeney	(Australia) Broc Feeney	(Australia) Broc Feeney	Triple Eight Race Engineering	Report
3	7	Perth SuperSprint	(New Zealand) Shane van Gisbergen	(Australia) Todd Hazelwood	(New Zealand) Shane van Gisbergen	Triple Eight Race Engineering	Report
3	8	Perth SuperSprint	(Australia) Will Brown	(Australia) James Golding	(Australia) Will Brown	Erebus Motorsport	Report
3	9	Perth SuperSprint	(Australia) Broc Feeney	(Australia) Broc Feeney	(Australia) Broc Feeney	Triple Eight Race Engineering	Report
4	10	Tasmania SuperSprint	(Australia) Will Brown	(Australia) Cam Waters	(Australia) Will Brown	Erebus Motorsport	Report
4	11	Tasmania SuperSprint	(Australia) Brodie Kostecki	(Australia) Will Davison	(Australia) Broc Feeney	Triple Eight Race Engineering	Report
4	12	Tasmania SuperSprint	(Australia) Brodie Kostecki	(Australia) Cam Waters	(Australia) Will Brown	Erebus Motorsport	Report
5	13	Darwin Triple Crown	(Australia) Cam Waters	(Australia) Mark Winterbottom	(Australia) Mark Winterbottom	Team 18	Report
5	14	Darwin Triple Crown	(Australia) Broc Feeney	(Australia) Chaz Mostert	(Australia) Broc Feeney	Triple Eight Race Engineering	Report
5	15	Darwin Triple Crown	(Australia) Jack Le Brocq	(Australia) Jack Le Brocq	(Australia) Jack Le Brocq	Matt Stone Racing	Report
6	16	Townsville 500	(Australia) Will Brown	(New Zealand) Andre Heimgartner	(Australia) Will Brown	Erebus Motorsport	Report
6	17	Townsville 500	(Australia) Cam Waters	(Australia) Scott Pye	(Australia) Anton de Pasquale	Dick Johnson Racing	Report
7	18	Sydney SuperNight	(New Zealand) Andre Heimgartner	(New Zealand) Shane van Gisbergen	(Australia) Brodie Kostecki	Erebus Motorsport	Report
7	19	Sydney SuperNight	(New Zealand) Shane van Gisbergen	(Australia) Jack Smith	(New Zealand) Shane van Gisbergen	Triple Eight Race Engineering	Report
8	20	The Bend SuperSprint	(Australia) Brodie Kostecki	(Australia) James Courtney	(Australia) Brodie Kostecki	Erebus Motorsport	Report
8	21	The Bend SuperSprint	(Australia) Thomas Randle	(Australia) Brodie Kostecki	(Australia) Brodie Kostecki	Erebus Motorsport	Report
8	22	The Bend SuperSprint	(Australia) Brodie Kostecki	(Australia) Cam Waters	(Australia) Brodie Kostecki	Erebus Motorsport	Report
9	23	Sandown 500	(Australia) Will Brown	(Australia) Garry Jacobson	(Australia) Broc Feeney (Australia) Jamie Whincup	Triple Eight Race Engineering	Report
10	24	Bathurst 1000	(Australia) Brodie Kostecki	(Australia) Will Brown	(New Zealand) Shane van Gisbergen (New Zealand) Richie Stanaway	Triple Eight Race Engineering	Report
11	25	Gold Coast 500	(Australia) Cam Waters	(Australia) Chaz Mostert	(Australia) Cam Waters	Tickford Racing	Report
11	26	Gold Coast 500	(Australia) Brodie Kostecki	(Australia) Brodie Kostecki	(Australia) David Reynolds	Grove Racing	Report
12	27	Adelaide 500	(Australia) Brodie Kostecki	(Australia) David Reynolds	(Australia) Cam Waters	Tickford Racing	Report
12	28	Adelaide 500	(Australia) Brodie Kostecki	(Australia) Declan Fraser	(New Zealand) Matt Payne	Grove Racing	Report

=== Points system ===
Points were awarded for each race at an event, to the driver or drivers of a car that completed at least 75% of the race distance and was running at the completion of the race. At least 50% of the planned race distance must be completed for the result to be valid and championship points awarded. No extra points were awarded if the fastest lap time is achieved by a driver who was classified outside the top fifteen.

Points format	Position																												
Points format	1st	2nd	3rd	4th	5th	6th	7th	8th	9th	10th	11th	12th	13th	14th	15th	16th	17th	18th	19th	20th	21st	22nd	23rd	24th	25th	26th	27th	28th	FL
Endurance	300	276	258	240	222	204	192	180	168	156	144	138	132	126	120	114	108	102	96	90	84	78	72	66	60	54	48	42	
Two-race	150	138	129	120	111	102	96	90	84	78	72	69	66	63	60	57	54	51	48	45	42	39	36	33	30				
SuperSprint	100	92	86	80	74	68	64	60	56	52	48	46	44	42	40	38	36	34	32	30	28	26	24	22	20	18			5
Melbourne	75	69	64	60	55	51	48	45	42	39	36	34	33	31	30	28	27	25	24	22	21	19	18	16	15				5

- Endurance: Used for the Sandown 500 and Bathurst 1000.
- Two-race: Used for the Newcastle 500, Townsville 500, Sydney SuperNight (with 5 points awarded for the fastest lap), Gold Coast 500 and Adelaide 500.
- SuperSprint: Used for all SuperSprint races (exc. Melbourne) and the Darwin Triple Crown.
- Melbourne: Used for the Melbourne SuperSprint.

=== Drivers' championship ===
Pos.	Driver	No.	NEW (New South Wales)		MEL (Victoria (state))				WAN (Western Australia)			SYM (Tasmania)			HID (Northern Territory)			TOW (Queensland)		SMP (New South Wales)		BEN (South Australia)			SAN (Victoria (state))	BAT (New South Wales)	SUR (Queensland)		ADE (South Australia)		Pen.	Pts.
1	(Australia) Brodie Kostecki	99	**3**	6	2	1	**1**	3	2	2	3	23	**2**	**3**	4	4	26	19	2	1	8	**1**	1	**1**	2	**2**	5	**2**	**6**	**8**	0	2888
2	(New Zealand) Shane van Gisbergen	97	DSQ	1	1	**2**	2	4	**1**	5	12	3	Ret	4	6	2	4	4	5	7	**1**	5	5	5	3	1	2	5	Ret	Ret	0	2565
3	(Australia) Broc Feeney	88	DSQ	5	4	3	7	**1**	10	13	**1**	18	1	2	2	**1**	3	2	4	11	4	6	9	25	1	23	14	8	5	2	0	2441
4	(Australia) Chaz Mostert	25	2	2	5	4	4	14	11	4	5	Ret	6	6	8	13	9	3	Ret	2	7	2	3	9	22	4	8	13	4	5	0	2287
5	(Australia) Will Brown	9	4	13	3	6	3	23	16	**1**	2	**1**	3	1	7	5	6	**1**	6	3	14	Ret	13	13	**4**	8	11	11	Ret	14	0	2264
6	(Australia) Cam Waters	6	1	12	7	19	10	10	22	8	6	4	4	7	**Ret**	12	5	5	**15**	5	6	4	24	2	20	Ret	**1**	3	1	4	0	2099
7	(New Zealand) Andre Heimgartner	8	5	7	17	16	5	2	21	10	22	2	12	17	16	3	2	7	3	**14**	2	10	10	12	5	Ret	7	17	9	6	0	2016
8	(Australia) Anton de Pasquale	11	16	16	**6**	5	Ret	22	13	22	15	13	14	9	9	17	17	Ret	1	15	3	11	7	7	8	3	13	21	21	7	0	1818
9	(Australia) David Reynolds	26	10	**3**	19	23	14	8	3	14	4	16	23	12	20	22	12	21	17	Ret	20	13	4	20	Ret	5	3	1	2	3	0	1806
10	(Australia) Will Davison	17	11	19	16	11	11	6	8	6	7	11	5	13	3	24	8	10	21	16	17	9	22	6	7	16	15	16	7	9	0	1786
11	(Australia) Bryce Fullwood	14	15	11	11	7	12	18	14	12	17	19	17	10	5	8	11	8	9	8	5	21	8	23	14	7	22	10	19	18	0	1722
12	(Australia) Jack Le Brocq	34	9	8	8	Ret	6	5	12	15	24	7	8	5	11	20	**1**	12	10	4	10	15	25	10	16	9	Ret	14	14	23	0	1715
13	(Australia) Thomas Randle	55	17	18	12	8	9	11	9	23	Ret	10	22	14	21	10	14	13	8	23	22	3	**2**	3	25	12	4	7	3	10	0	1700
14	(New Zealand) Matt Payne	19	12	14	13	17	21	12	6	9	18	15	15	21	19	23	25	15	18	24	23	7	6	18	6	11	9	4	23	1	0	1673
15	(Australia) Mark Winterbottom	18	6	10	21	9	Ret	19	18	18	19	12	13	8	1	18	7	11	7	9	9	17	17	24	11	Ret	12	9	11	15	0	1579
16	(Australia) James Golding	31	18	4	22	21	19	16	15	11	11	14	9	16	14	6	20	20	12	12	16	14	23	15	15	10	17	6	13	20	0	1569
17	(Australia) James Courtney	5	8	DNS	9	22	Ret	DNS	5	3	9	24	16	22	23	16	21	9	16	13	13	8	11	8	12	6	10	Ret	8	12	0	1568
18	(Australia) Scott Pye	20	7	17	15	18	20	13	20	17	10	5	20	15	12	9	23	6	11	10	11	22	15	11	21	17	6	Ret	10	13	0	1524
19	(Australia) Tim Slade	23	22	9	20	13	8	15	7	24	8	6	7	25	10	11	18	18	23	6	12	16	18	22	9	13	21	Ret	16	16	0	1497
20	(Australia) Nick Percat	2	Ret	23	14	Ret	16	20	17	19	13	9	10	23	18	19	15	24	13	20	19	18	12	4	23	14	18	12	18	21	0	1230
21	(Australia) Todd Hazelwood	3	14	15	DSQ	20	15	9	4	7	14	20	19	24	17	14	10	23	Ret	18	21	12	16	16	17	Ret	19	18	12	11	0	1221
22	(Australia) Macauley Jones	96	19	22	10	12	Ret	7	24	16	20	22	21	19	15	7	13	16	20	22	18	20	19	21	19	22	16	Ret	17	22	0	1138
23	(Australia) Cameron Hill	35	20	21	18	15	17	Ret	23	25	16	8	11	11	13	15	16	17	22	17	24	Ret	20	19	Ret	15	23	15	22	17	0	1080
24	(Australia) Declan Fraser	56	13	Ret	24	10	13	21	19	21	23	21	Ret	20	Ret	25	19	14	19	21	25	19	14	17	13	18	20	20	15	Ret	0	1046
25	(Australia) Jack Smith	4	21	20	23	14	18	17	25	20	21	17	18	18	24	Ret	22	22	14	19	15	Ret	21	14	18	21	Ret	19	20	19	0	1030
26	(New Zealand) Richie Stanaway	97																							3	1					0	558
27	(Australia) David Russell	99																							2	2					0	552
28	(Australia) Tony D'Alberto	11																							8	3					0	438
29	(Australia) Jack Perkins	9																							4	8					0	420
30	(Australia) Jamie Whincup	88																							1	23					0	372
31	(France) Kévin Estre	19																							6	11					0	348
32	(Australia) Zak Best	5																							12	6					0	342
33	(Australia) Lee Holdsworth	25																							22	4					0	318
34	(Australia) Dean Fiore	14																							14	7					0	318
35	(Australia) Alex Davison	17																							7	16					0	306
36	(Australia) Jonathon Webb	23																							9	13					0	300
37	(Australia) Zane Goddard	888													22	21	24								10	24					0	298
38	(Australia) Jayden Ojeda	34																							16	9					0	282
39	(Australia) Dylan O'Keeffe	31																							15	10					0	276
40	(Australia) Tyler Everingham	56																							13	18					0	234
41	(Australia) Garth Tander	26																							Ret	5					0	222
42	(Australia) Dale Wood	8																							5	Ret					0	222
43	(Australia) Craig Lowndes	888																							10	24					0	222
44	(Australia) Garry Jacobson	55																							25	12					0	198
45	(New Zealand) Fabian Coulthard	2																							23	14					0	198
46	(Australia) Warren Luff	20																							21	17					0	192
47	(New Zealand) Jaxon Evans	4																							18	21					0	186
48	(Australia) Jordan Boys	96																							19	22					0	174
49	(Australia) Aaron Love	7																							24	19					0	162
50	(Australia) Jake Kostecki	7																							24	19					0	162
51	(Australia) Michael Caruso	18																							11	Ret					0	144
52	(Australia) Jaylyn Robotham	35																							Ret	15					0	120
53	(Australia) Tim Blanchard	3																							17	Ret					0	108
54	(Australia) James Moffat	6																							20	Ret					0	90
55	(Australia) Kai Allen	98																								20					0	90
56	(Switzerland) Simona de Silvestro	98																								20					0	90
Pos.	Driver	No.	NEW (New South Wales)		MEL (Victoria (state))				WAN (Western Australia)			SYM (Tasmania)			HID (Northern Territory)			TOW (Queensland)		SMP (New South Wales)		BEN (South Australia)			SAN (Victoria (state))	BAT (New South Wales)	SUR (Queensland)		ADE (South Australia)		Pen.	Pts.

Key
Colour	Result
Gold	Winner
Silver	Second place
Bronze	Third place
Green	Other points position
Blue	Other classified position
Blue	Not classified, finished (NC)
Purple	Not classified, retired (Ret)
Red	Did not qualify (DNQ)
Red	Did not pre-qualify (DNPQ)
Black	Disqualified (DSQ)
White	Did not start (DNS)
White	Race cancelled (C)
Blank	Did not practice (DNP)
Blank	Excluded (EX)
Blank	Did not arrive (DNA)
Blank	Withdrawn (WD)
Blank	Did not enter (cell empty)
Text formatting	Meaning
**Bold**	Pole position
Italics	Fastest lap

=== Teams' championship ===
Pos.	Driver	No.	NEW (New South Wales)		MEL (Victoria (state))				WAN (Western Australia)			SYM (Tasmania)			HID (Northern Territory)			TOW (Queensland)		SMP (New South Wales)		BEN (South Australia)			SAN (Victoria (state))	BAT (New South Wales)	SUR (Queensland)		ADE (South Australia)		Pen.	Pts.
1	Erebus Motorsport	9	4	13	3	6	3	23	16	**1**	2	**1**	3	1	7	5	6	**1**	6	3	14	Ret	13	13	**4**	8	11	11	Ret	14	0	5152
1	Erebus Motorsport	99	**3**	6	2	1	**1**	3	2	2	3	23	**2**	**3**	4	4	26	19	2	1	8	**1**	1	**1**	2	**2**	5	**2**	**6**	**8**	0	5152
2	Triple Eight Race Engineering	88	DSQ	5	4	3	7	**1**	10	13	**1**	18	1	2	2	**1**	3	2	4	11	4	6	9	25	1	23	14	8	5	2	30	4976
2	Triple Eight Race Engineering	97	DSQ	1	1	**2**	2	4	**1**	5	12	3	Ret	4	6	2	4	4	5	7	**1**	5	5	5	3	1	2	5	Ret	Ret	30	4976
3	Brad Jones Racing	8	5	7	17	16	5	2	21	10	22	2	12	17	16	3	2	7	3	**14**	2	10	10	12	5	Ret	7	17	9	6	30	3708
3	Brad Jones Racing	14	15	11	11	7	12	18	15	12	17	19	17	10	5	8	11	8	9	8	5	21	8	23	14	7	22	10	19	18	30	3708
4	Tickford Racing	5	8	DNS	9	22	Ret	DNS	5	3	9	24	16	22	23	16	21	9	16	13	13	8	11	8	12	6	10	Ret	8	12	0	3667
4	Tickford Racing	6	1	12	7	19	10	10	22	8	6	4	4	7	**Ret**	12	5	5	**15**	5	6	4	24	2	20	Ret	**1**	3	1	4	0	3667
5	Dick Johnson Racing	11	16	16	**6**	5	Ret	22	13	22	15	13	14	9	9	17	17	Ret	1	15	3	11	7	7	8	3	13	21	21	7	0	3604
5	Dick Johnson Racing	17	11	19	16	11	11	6	8	6	7	11	5	13	3	24	8	10	21	16	17	9	22	6	7	16	15	16	7	9	0	3604
6	Walkinshaw Andretti United	2	Ret	23	14	Ret	16	20	17	19	13	9	10	23	19	19	15	24	13	20	19	18	12	4	23	14	18	12	18	21	30	3487
6	Walkinshaw Andretti United	25	2	2	5	4	4	14	11	4	5	Ret	6	6	8	13	9	3	Ret	2	7	2	3	9	22	4	8	13	4	5	30	3487
7	Grove Racing	19	12	14	13	17	21	12	6	9	18	15	15	21	20	23	25	15	18	24	23	7	6	18	6	11	9	4	23	1	0	3479
7	Grove Racing	26	10	**3**	19	23	14	8	3	14	4	16	24	12	21	22	12	21	17	Ret	20	13	4	20	Ret	5	3	1	2	3	0	3479
8	Team 18	18	6	10	21	9	Ret	19	18	18	19	12	13	8	1	18	7	11	7	9	9	17	17	24	11	Ret	12	9	11	15	0	3103
8	Team 18	20	7	17	15	18	20	13	20	17	10	5	20	15	12	9	23	6	11	10	11	22	15	11	21	17	6	Ret	10	13	0	3103
9	PremiAir Racing	23	22	9	20	13	8	15	7	24	8	6	7	25	10	11	18	18	23	6	12	16	18	22	9	13	21	Ret	16	16	50	3016
9	PremiAir Racing	31	18	4	22	21	19	16	14	11	11	14	9	16	14	6	20	20	12	12	16	14	23	15	15	10	17	6	13	20	50	3016
10	Matt Stone Racing	34	9	8	8	Ret	6	5	12	15	24	7	8	5	11	20	**1**	12	10	4	10	15	25	10	16	9	Ret	14	14	23	0	2795
10	Matt Stone Racing	35	20	21	18	15	17	Ret	23	25	16	8	11	11	13	15	16	17	22	17	24	Ret	20	19	Ret	15	23	15	22	17	0	2795
11	Tickford Racing	55	17	18	12	8	9	11	9	23	Ret	10	22	14	17	10	14	13	8	23	22	3	**2**	3	25	12	4	7	3	10	60	2686
11	Tickford Racing	56	13	Ret	24	10	13	21	19	21	23	21	Ret	20	Ret	25	19	14	19	21	25	19	14	17	13	18	20	20	15	NC	60	2686
12	Brad Jones Racing	4	21	20	23	14	18	17	25	20	21	17	18	18	24	Ret	22	22	14	19	15	Ret	21	14	18	21	Ret	19	20	19	60	2108
12	Brad Jones Racing	96	19	22	10	12	Ret	7	24	16	20	22	21	19	15	7	13	16	20	22	18	20	19	21	19	22	16	Ret	17	22	60	2108
13	Blanchard Racing Team	3	14	15	DSQ	20	15	9	4	7	14	20	19	24	18	14	10	23	Ret	18	21	12	16	16	17	Ret	19	18	12	11	30	1191
14	Triple Eight Race Engineering (w)	888													22	21	24								10	24					0	298
15	Blanchard Racing Team (w)	7																							24	19					0	162
16	Dick Johnson Racing (w)	98																								20					30	60
Pos.	Driver	No.	NEW (New South Wales)		MEL (Victoria (state))				WAN (Western Australia)			SYM (Tasmania)			HID (Northern Territory)			TOW (Queensland)		SMP (New South Wales)		BEN (South Australia)			SAN (Victoria (state))	BAT (New South Wales)	SUR (Queensland)		ADE (South Australia)		Pen.	Pts.

Key
Colour	Result
Gold	Winner
Silver	Second place
Bronze	Third place
Green	Other points position
Blue	Other classified position
Blue	Not classified, finished (NC)
Purple	Not classified, retired (Ret)
Red	Did not qualify (DNQ)
Red	Did not pre-qualify (DNPQ)
Black	Disqualified (DSQ)
White	Did not start (DNS)
White	Race cancelled (C)
Blank	Did not practice (DNP)
Blank	Excluded (EX)
Blank	Did not arrive (DNA)
Blank	Withdrawn (WD)
Blank	Did not enter (cell empty)
Text formatting	Meaning
**Bold**	Pole position
Italics	Fastest lap

- (w) denotes wildcard entry.
