= 2023 Newcastle 500 =

2023 race event of the Supercars Championship

(New South Wales) 2023 Newcastle 500
Event Information
- Round 1 of 12 in the 2023 Supercars Championship
- Date: 10–12 March 2023
- Location: Newcastle East, New South Wales
- Venue: Newcastle Street Circuit

Results
Race 1
Distance	95 laps	250.895 km
Pole position	(Australia) Brodie Kostecki; Erebus Motorsport	1:11.3217
Winner	(Australia) Cam Waters; Tickford Racing	1:58:33.2312
Race 2
Distance	89 laps	235.049 km
Pole position	(Australia) David Reynolds; Grove Racing	1:12.0813
Winner	(New Zealand) Shane van Gisbergen; Triple Eight Race Engineering	2:11:50.4825

The 2023 Newcastle 500 (commercially titled 2023 Thrifty Newcastle 500) was a motor racing event for the Supercars Championship, held on the weekend of 10 to 12 March 2023. The event was held on the Newcastle Street Circuit in Newcastle East, New South Wales and consisted of two races, 250 kilometres in length. It was the first round of the 2023 Supercars Championship and the first round of the "Gen3" Supercars Championship regulations, as well as the last staging of the Newcastle 500.

== Results ==
=== Qualifying 1 ===
Pos.	No.	Driver	Team	Car	Times	
Pos.	No.	Driver	Team	Car	Qualifying	Shootout
1	99	(Australia) Brodie Kostecki	Erebus Motorsport	Chevrolet Camaro Gen6	1:11.3217	1:11.8481
2	6	(Australia) Cam Waters	Tickford Racing	Ford Mustang S650	+0.2601	+0.1520
3	88	(Australia) Broc Feeney	Triple Eight Race Engineering	Chevrolet Camaro Gen6	+0.3157	+0.1527
4	400	(Australia) Tim Slade	PremiAir Racing	Chevrolet Camaro Gen6	+0.1261	+0.1538
5	26	(Australia) David Reynolds	Grove Racing	Ford Mustang S650	+0.2513	+0.1783
6	97	(New Zealand) Shane van Gisbergen	Triple Eight Race Engineering	Chevrolet Camaro Gen6	+0.1141	+0.1940
7	25	(Australia) Chaz Mostert	Walkinshaw Andretti United	Ford Mustang S650	+0.0371	+0.2648
8	8	(New Zealand) Andre Heimgartner	Brad Jones Racing	Chevrolet Camaro Gen6	+0.3840	+0.2943
9	20	(Australia) Scott Pye	Charlie Schwerkolt Racing	Chevrolet Camaro Gen6	+0.4040	+0.3110
10	31	(Australia) James Golding	PremiAir Racing	Chevrolet Camaro Gen6	+0.4298	+0.3951
11	9	(Australia) Will Brown	Erebus Motorsport	Chevrolet Camaro Gen6	+0.4304	
12	5	(Australia) James Courtney	Tickford Racing	Ford Mustang S650	+0.4454	
13	55	(Australia) Thomas Randle	Tickford Racing	Ford Mustang S650	+0.4623	
14	17	(Australia) Will Davison	Dick Johnson Racing	Ford Mustang S650	+0.4780	
15	34	(Australia) Jack Le Brocq	Matt Stone Racing	Chevrolet Camaro Gen6	+0.5581	
16	18	(Australia) Mark Winterbottom	Charlie Schwerkolt Racing	Chevrolet Camaro Gen6	+0.6048	
17	11	(Australia) Anton de Pasquale	Dick Johnson Racing	Ford Mustang S650	+0.6292	
18	14	(Australia) Bryce Fullwood	Brad Jones Racing	Chevrolet Camaro Gen6	+0.6397	
19	35	(Australia) Cameron Hill	Matt Stone Racing	Chevrolet Camaro Gen6	+0.6438	
20	3	(Australia) Todd Hazelwood	Blanchard Racing Team	Ford Mustang S650	+0.6472	
21	2	(Australia) Nick Percat	Walkinshaw Andretti United	Ford Mustang S650	+0.6920	
22	19	(New Zealand) Matthew Payne	Grove Racing	Ford Mustang S650	+0.7215	
23	96	(Australia) Macauley Jones	Brad Jones Racing	Chevrolet Camaro Gen6	+0.7247	
24	56	(Australia) Declan Fraser	Tickford Racing	Ford Mustang S650	+1.2286	
25	4	(Australia) Jack Smith	Brad Jones Racing	Chevrolet Camaro Gen6	+1.3477	

=== Race 1 ===
Pos.	No.	Driver	Team	Car	Laps	Time/Retired	Grid	Pts.
1	6	(Australia) Cam Waters	Tickford Racing	Ford Mustang S650	95	1:58:33.2312	2	150
2	25	(Australia) Chaz Mostert	Walkinshaw Andretti United	Ford Mustang S650	95	+7.6491	7	138
3	99	(Australia) Brodie Kostecki	Erebus Motorsport	Chevrolet Camaro Gen6	95	+13.4411	1	129
4	9	(Australia) Will Brown	Erebus Motorsport	Chevrolet Camaro Gen6	95	+17.5361	11	120
5	8	(New Zealand) Andre Heimgartner	Brad Jones Racing	Chevrolet Camaro Gen6	95	+18.4873	8	111
6	18	(Australia) Mark Winterbottom	Charlie Schwerkolt Racing	Chevrolet Camaro Gen6	95	+24.5926	16	102
7	20	(Australia) Scott Pye	Charlie Schwerkolt Racing	Chevrolet Camaro Gen6	95	+30.4976	9	96
8	5	(Australia) James Courtney	Tickford Racing	Ford Mustang S650	95	+42.7666	12	90
9	34	(Australia) Jack Le Brocq	Matt Stone Racing	Chevrolet Camaro Gen6	95	+42.8684	15	84
10	26	(Australia) David Reynolds	Grove Racing	Ford Mustang S650	95	+43.5652	5	78
11	17	(Australia) Will Davison	Dick Johnson Racing	Ford Mustang S650	95	+49.7735	14	72
12	19	(New Zealand) Matthew Payne	Grove Racing	Ford Mustang S650	95	+53.1997	22	69
13	56	(Australia) Declan Fraser	Tickford Racing	Ford Mustang S650	95	+1:37.7302	24	66
14	3	(Australia) Todd Hazelwood	Blanchard Racing Team	Ford Mustang S650	95	+1:40.3506	20	63
15	14	(Australia) Bryce Fullwood	Brad Jones Racing	Chevrolet Camaro Gen6	95	+1:56.5120	18	60
16	11	(Australia) Anton de Pasquale	Dick Johnson Racing	Ford Mustang S650	95	+2:01.4156	17	57
17	55	(Australia) Thomas Randle	Tickford Racing	Ford Mustang S650	95	+2:02.8224	13	54
18	31	(Australia) James Golding	PremiAir Racing	Chevrolet Camaro Gen6	94	+1 lap	10	51
19	96	(Australia) Macauley Jones	Brad Jones Racing	Chevrolet Camaro Gen6	94	+1 lap	23	48
20	35	(Australia) Cameron Hill	Matt Stone Racing	Chevrolet Camaro Gen6	94	+1 lap	19	45
21	4	(Australia) Jack Smith	Brad Jones Racing	Chevrolet Camaro Gen6	93	+2 laps	25	42
22	400	(Australia) Tim Slade	PremiAir Racing	Chevrolet Camaro Gen6	90	+5 laps	4	39
DNF	2	(Australia) Nick Percat	Walkinshaw Andretti United	Ford Mustang S650	50	Mechanical	21	
DSQ	97	(New Zealand) Shane van Gisbergen	Triple Eight Race Engineering	Chevrolet Camaro Gen6	95	Technical	6	
DSQ	88	(Australia) Broc Feeney	Triple Eight Race Engineering	Chevrolet Camaro Gen6	95	Technical	3	
Fastest Lap: Chaz Mostert (Walkinshaw Andretti United), 1:12.6998

=== Qualifying 2 ===
Pos.	No.	Driver	Team	Car	Times	
Pos.	No.	Driver	Team	Car	Qualifying	Shootout
1	26	(Australia) David Reynolds	Grove Racing	Ford Mustang S650	1:11.4872	1:12.0813
2	25	(Australia) Chaz Mostert	Walkinshaw Andretti United	Ford Mustang S650	+0.2855	+0.0058
3	31	(Australia) James Golding	PremiAir Racing	Chevrolet Camaro Gen6	+0.0456	+0.1092
4	6	(Australia) Cam Waters	Tickford Racing	Ford Mustang S650	+0.0147	+0.2142
5	97	(New Zealand) Shane van Gisbergen	Triple Eight Race Engineering	Chevrolet Camaro Gen6	+0.1442	+0.2672
6	400	(Australia) Tim Slade	PremiAir Racing	Chevrolet Camaro Gen6	+0.2364	+0.5455
7	88	(Australia) Broc Feeney	Triple Eight Race Engineering	Chevrolet Camaro Gen6	+0.4184	+0.6588
8	34	(Australia) Jack Le Brocq	Matt Stone Racing	Chevrolet Camaro Gen6	+0.4001	+0.8770
9	3	(Australia) Todd Hazelwood	Blanchard Racing Team	Ford Mustang S650	+0.2927	+1.0226
10	5	(Australia) James Courtney	Tickford Racing	Ford Mustang S650	+0.3957	DNF
11	17	(Australia) Will Davison	Dick Johnson Racing	Ford Mustang S650	+0.4619	
12	19	(New Zealand) Matthew Payne	Grove Racing	Ford Mustang S650	+0.4722	
13	8	(New Zealand) Andre Heimgartner	Brad Jones Racing	Chevrolet Camaro Gen6	+0.4880	
14	18	(Australia) Mark Winterbottom	Charlie Schwerkolt Racing	Chevrolet Camaro Gen6	+0.5477	
15	99	(Australia) Brodie Kostecki	Erebus Motorsport	Chevrolet Camaro Gen6	+0.5595	
16	55	(Australia) Thomas Randle	Tickford Racing	Ford Mustang S650	+0.6151	
17	9	(Australia) Will Brown	Erebus Motorsport	Chevrolet Camaro Gen6	+0.6361	
18	20	(Australia) Scott Pye	Charlie Schwerkolt Racing	Chevrolet Camaro Gen6	+0.6365	
19	14	(Australia) Bryce Fullwood	Brad Jones Racing	Chevrolet Camaro Gen6	+0.6379	
20	2	(Australia) Nick Percat	Walkinshaw Andretti United	Ford Mustang S650	+0.6601	
21	11	(Australia) Anton de Pasquale	Dick Johnson Racing	Ford Mustang S650	+0.7002	
22	35	(Australia) Cameron Hill	Matt Stone Racing	Chevrolet Camaro Gen6	+0.7214	
23	96	(Australia) Macauley Jones	Brad Jones Racing	Chevrolet Camaro Gen6	+0.8227	
24	56	(Australia) Declan Fraser	Tickford Racing	Ford Mustang S650	+0.8266	
25	4	(Australia) Jack Smith	Brad Jones Racing	Chevrolet Camaro Gen6	+1.4589	

=== Race 2 ===
Pos.	No.	Driver	Team	Car	Laps	Time/Retired	Grid	Pts.
1	97	(New Zealand) Shane van Gisbergen	Triple Eight Race Engineering	Chevrolet Camaro Gen6	89	2:11:50.4825	5	150
2	25	(Australia) Chaz Mostert	Walkinshaw Andretti United	Ford Mustang S650	89	+4.4992	2	138
3	26	(Australia) David Reynolds	Grove Racing	Ford Mustang S650	89	+25.1401	1	129
4	31	(Australia) James Golding	PremiAir Racing	Chevrolet Camaro Gen6	89	+27.0901	3	120
5	88	(Australia) Broc Feeney	Triple Eight Race Engineering	Chevrolet Camaro Gen6	89	+27.6594	7	111
6	99	(Australia) Brodie Kostecki	Erebus Motorsport	Chevrolet Camaro Gen6	89	+28.6089	15	102
7	8	(New Zealand) Andre Heimgartner	Brad Jones Racing	Chevrolet Camaro Gen6	89	+33.3244	13	96
8	34	(Australia) Jack Le Brocq	Matt Stone Racing	Chevrolet Camaro Gen6	89	+46.9619	8	90
9	400	(Australia) Tim Slade	PremiAir Racing	Chevrolet Camaro Gen6	89	+54.4407	6	84
10	18	(Australia) Mark Winterbottom	Charlie Schwerkolt Racing	Chevrolet Camaro Gen6	89	+58.9769	14	78
11	14	(Australia) Bryce Fullwood	Brad Jones Racing	Chevrolet Camaro Gen6	89	+1:04.1607	19	72
12	6	(Australia) Cam Waters	Tickford Racing	Ford Mustang S650	89	+1:15.5631	4	69
13	9	(Australia) Will Brown	Erebus Motorsport	Chevrolet Camaro Gen6	88	+1 lap	17	66
14	19	(New Zealand) Matthew Payne	Grove Racing	Ford Mustang S650	88	+1 lap	12	63
15	3	(Australia) Todd Hazelwood	Blanchard Racing Team	Ford Mustang S650	88	+1 lap	9	60
16	11	(Australia) Anton de Pasquale	Dick Johnson Racing	Ford Mustang S650	88	+1 lap	21	57
17	20	(Australia) Scott Pye	Charlie Schwerkolt Racing	Chevrolet Camaro Gen6	88	+1 lap	18	54
18	55	(Australia) Thomas Randle	Tickford Racing	Ford Mustang S650	88	+1 lap	16	51
19	17	(Australia) Will Davison	Dick Johnson Racing	Ford Mustang S650	88	+1 lap	11	48
20	4	(Australia) Jack Smith	Brad Jones Racing	Chevrolet Camaro Gen6	88	+1 lap	25	45
21	35	(Australia) Cameron Hill	Matt Stone Racing	Chevrolet Camaro Gen6	88	+1 lap	22	42
22	96	(Australia) Macauley Jones	Brad Jones Racing	Chevrolet Camaro Gen6	88	+1 lap	23	39
23	2	(Australia) Nick Percat	Walkinshaw Andretti United	Ford Mustang S650	87	+2 laps	20	36
DNF	56	(Australia) Declan Fraser	Tickford Racing	Ford Mustang S650	0	Crash	24	
DNS	5	(Australia) James Courtney	Tickford Racing	Ford Mustang S650		Crash in Shootout		
Fastest Lap: Shane van Gisbergen (Triple Eight Race Engineering), 1:12.5355

== Championship standings ==
Drivers standings

Pos	Driver	Pts	Gap
1	(Australia) Chaz Mostert	276	
2	(Australia) Brodie Kostecki	231	+45
3	(Australia) Cam Waters	219	+57
4	(Australia) David Reynolds	207	+69
5	(New Zealand) Andre Heimgartner	207	+69

Teams standings

Pos	Team	Pts	Gap
1	Erebus Motorsport	417	
2	Grove Racing	339	+78
3	Charlie Schwerkolt Racing	330	+87
4	Walkinshaw Andretti United	312	+105
5	Tickford Racing (#5, #6)	309	+108

- Note: Only the top five positions are included for both sets of standings.
