= 2023 Sydney SuperNight =

Motor racing event

(New South Wales) 2023 Sydney SuperNight
Event Information
- Round 7 of 12 in the 2023 Supercars Championship
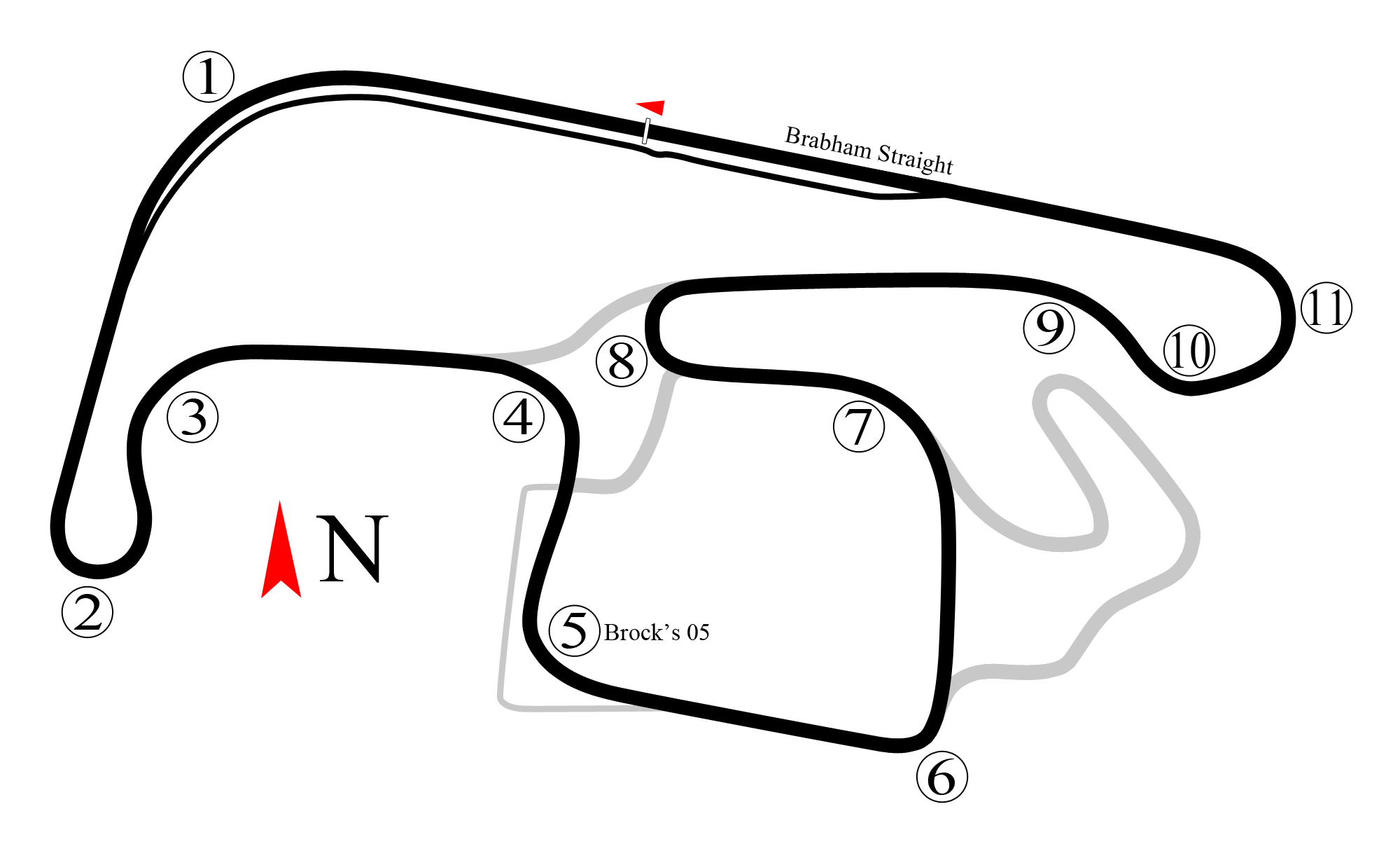
- Layout of the Sydney Motorsport Park
- Date: 29-30 July 2023
- Location: Eastern Creek, New South Wales
- Venue: Sydney Motorsport Park

Results
Race 1
| Distance | 51 laps | 200.430 km |
| Pole position | (New Zealand) Andre Heimgartner; Brad Jones Racing | 1:29.3447 |
| Winner | (Australia) Brodie Kostecki; Erebus Motorsport | 1:22:58.4478 |
Race 2
| Distance | 36 laps | 141.480 km |
| Pole position | (New Zealand) Shane van Gisbergen; Triple Eight Race Engineering | 1:29.9100 |
| Winner | (New Zealand) Shane van Gisbergen; Triple Eight Race Engineering | 57:04.6373 |
Round Results
| First | (New Zealand) Shane van Gisbergen; Triple Eight Race Engineering | 250 pts |
| Second | (Australia) Brodie Kostecki; Erebus Motorsport | 241 pts |
| Third | (Australia) Chaz Mostert; Walkinshaw Andretti United | 234 pts |

The 2023 Sydney SuperNight (commercially titled 2023 Beaurepaires Sydney SuperNight) was a motor racing event held as a part of the 2023 Supercars Championship from Saturday 29 July to Sunday 30 July 2023. The event was held at the Sydney Motorsport Park in Eastern Creek, New South Wales.

== Results ==
=== Qualifying 1 ===
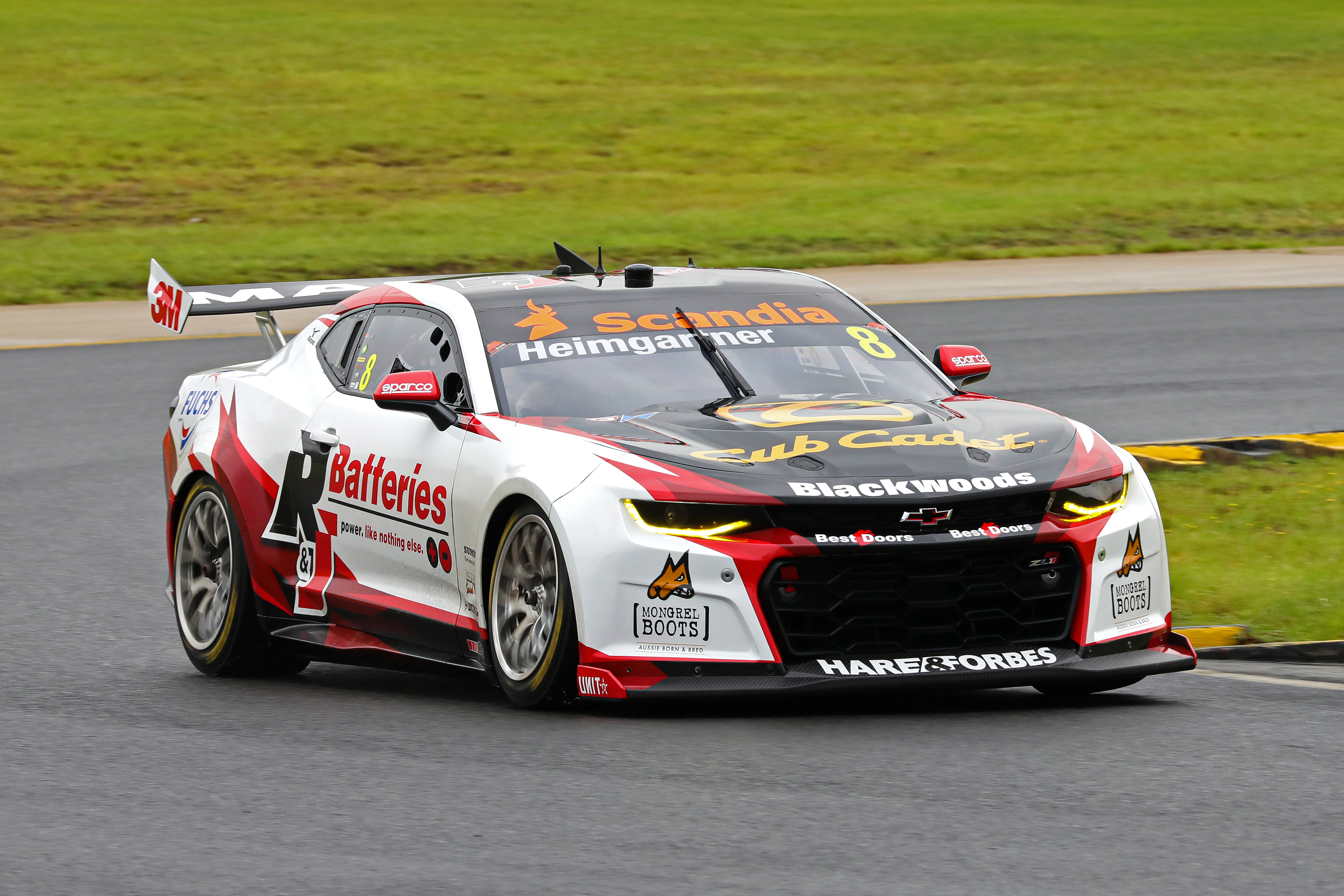
Andre Heimgartner (pictured at the pre-season test) claimed pole position for Race 1.

| Pos. | No. | Driver | Team | Car | Qualifying | | |
| Pos. | No. | Driver | Team | Car | Q1 | Q2 | Q3 |
|---|---|---|---|---|---|---|---|
| 1 | 8 | (New Zealand) Andre Heimgartner | Brad Jones Racing | Chevrolet Camaro Gen6 | | | 1:29.3447 |
| 2 | 99 | (Australia) Brodie Kostecki | Erebus Motorsport | Chevrolet Camaro Gen6 | | | +0.0817 |
| 3 | 6 | (Australia) Cam Waters | Tickford Racing | Ford Mustang S650 | | | +0.2319 |
| 4 | 9 | (Australia) Will Brown | Erebus Motorsport | Chevrolet Camaro Gen6 | | | +0.2629 |
| 5 | 34 | (Australia) Jack Le Brocq | Matt Stone Racing | Chevrolet Camaro Gen6 | | | +0.4130 |
| 6 | 14 | (Australia) Bryce Fullwood | Brad Jones Racing | Chevrolet Camaro Gen6 | | | +0.4603 |
| 7 | 31 | (Australia) James Golding | PremiAir Racing | Chevrolet Camaro Gen6 | | | +0.5640 |
| 8 | 35 | (Australia) Cameron Hill | Matt Stone Racing | Chevrolet Camaro Gen6 | | | +0.7834 |
| 9 | 25 | (Australia) Chaz Mostert | Walkinshaw Andretti United | Ford Mustang S650 | | | +1.0992 |
| 10 | 17 | (Australia) Will Davison | Dick Johnson Racing | Ford Mustang S650 | | | +1.3804 |
| 11 | 26 | (Australia) David Reynolds | Grove Racing | Ford Mustang S650 | | +0.3908 | |
| 12 | 55 | (Australia) Thomas Randle | Tickford Racing | Ford Mustang S650 | | +0.3926 | |
| 13 | 23 | (Australia) Tim Slade | PremiAir Racing | Chevrolet Camaro Gen6 | | +0.4335 | |
| 14 | 18 | (Australia) Mark Winterbottom | Team 18 | Chevrolet Camaro Gen6 | | +0.4566 | |
| 15 | 20 | (Australia) Scott Pye | Team 18 | Chevrolet Camaro Gen6 | | +0.6931 | |
| 16 | 88 | (Australia) Broc Feeney | Triple Eight Race Engineering | Chevrolet Camaro Gen6 | | +0.6973 | |
| 17 | 3 | (Australia) Todd Hazelwood | Blanchard Racing Team | Ford Mustang S650 | | +0.9014 | |
| 18 | 5 | (Australia) James Courtney | Tickford Racing | Ford Mustang S650 | | +0.9884 | |
| 19 | 96 | (Australia) Macauley Jones | Brad Jones Racing | Chevrolet Camaro Gen6 | | +1.1155 | |
| 20 | 97 | (New Zealand) Shane van Gisbergen | Triple Eight Race Engineering | Chevrolet Camaro Gen6 | | No time | |
| 21 | 2 | (Australia) Nick Percat | Walkinshaw Andretti United | Ford Mustang S650 | +0.9633 | | |
| 22 | 56 | (Australia) Declan Fraser | Tickford Racing | Ford Mustang S650 | +1.0002 | | |
| 23 | 11 | (Australia) Anton de Pasquale | Dick Johnson Racing | Ford Mustang S650 | +1.1090 | | |
| 24 | 19 | (New Zealand) Matthew Payne | Grove Racing | Ford Mustang S650 | +1.1504 | | |
| 25 | 4 | (Australia) Jack Smith | Brad Jones Racing | Chevrolet Camaro Gen6 | +2:21.7580 | | |

=== Race 1 ===
| Pos. | No. | Driver | Team | Car | Laps | Time/Retired | Grid | Pts. |
|---|---|---|---|---|---|---|---|---|
| 1 | 99 | (Australia) Brodie Kostecki | Erebus Motorsport | Chevrolet Camaro Gen6 | 51 | 1:22:58.4478 | 2 | 150 |
| 2 | 25 | (Australia) Chaz Mostert | Walkinshaw Andretti United | Ford Mustang S650 | 51 | +7.0050 | 9 | 138 |
| 3 | 9 | (Australia) Will Brown | Erebus Motorsport | Chevrolet Camaro Gen6 | 51 | +10.4796 | 4 | 129 |
| 4 | 34 | (Australia) Jack Le Brocq | Matt Stone Racing | Chevrolet Camaro Gen6 | 51 | +12.4560 | 5 | 120 |
| 5 | 6 | (Australia) Cam Waters | Tickford Racing | Ford Mustang S650 | 51 | +12.5545 (Note: Cam Waters received a 5-second post-race time penalty in Race 1 for an unsafe pit release.) | 3 | 111 |
| 6 | 23 | (Australia) Tim Slade | PremiAir Racing | Chevrolet Camaro Gen6 | 51 | +14.1094 | 13 | 102 |
| 7 | 97 | (New Zealand) Shane van Gisbergen | Triple Eight Race Engineering | Chevrolet Camaro Gen6 | 51 | +15.0627 (Note: Shane van Gisbergen received a 5-second post-race time penalty in Race 1 for a driving infringement.) | 20 | 96 |
| 8 | 14 | (Australia) Bryce Fullwood | Brad Jones Racing | Chevrolet Camaro Gen6 | 51 | +15.3062 | 6 | 90 |
| 9 | 18 | (Australia) Mark Winterbottom | Team 18 | Chevrolet Camaro Gen6 | 51 | +18.2630 | 14 | 84 |
| 10 | 20 | (Australia) Scott Pye | Team 18 | Chevrolet Camaro Gen6 | 51 | +19.1481 | 15 | 78 |
| 11 | 88 | (Australia) Broc Feeney | Triple Eight Race Engineering | Chevrolet Camaro Gen6 | 51 | +19.4468 | 16 | 72 |
| 12 | 31 | (Australia) James Golding | PremiAir Racing | Chevrolet Camaro Gen6 | 51 | +19.9843 | 7 | 69 |
| 13 | 5 | (Australia) James Courtney | Tickford Racing | Ford Mustang S650 | 51 | +21.3506 | 18 | 66 |
| 14 | 8 | (New Zealand) Andre Heimgartner | Brad Jones Racing | Chevrolet Camaro Gen6 | 51 | +23.3637 | 1 | 63 |
| 15 | 11 | (Australia) Anton de Pasquale | Dick Johnson Racing | Ford Mustang S650 | 51 | +23.6867 | 23 | 60 |
| 16 | 17 | (Australia) Will Davison | Dick Johnson Racing | Ford Mustang S650 | 51 | +25.7597 | 10 | 57 |
| 17 | 35 | (Australia) Cameron Hill | Matt Stone Racing | Chevrolet Camaro Gen6 | 51 | +27.1999 | 8 | 54 |
| 18 | 3 | (Australia) Todd Hazelwood | Blanchard Racing Team | Ford Mustang S650 | 51 | +28.6923 | 17 | 51 |
| 19 | 4 | (Australia) Jack Smith | Brad Jones Racing | Chevrolet Camaro Gen6 | 51 | +29.8866 | 25 | 48 |
| 20 | 2 | (Australia) Nick Percat | Walkinshaw Andretti United | Ford Mustang S650 | 51 | +29.8940 | 21 | 45 |
| 21 | 56 | (Australia) Declan Fraser | Tickford Racing | Ford Mustang S650 | 51 | +31.1230 | 22 | 42 |
| 22 | 96 | (Australia) Macauley Jones | Brad Jones Racing | Chevrolet Camaro Gen6 | 51 | +32.1674 | 19 | 39 |
| 23 | 55 | (Australia) Thomas Randle | Tickford Racing | Ford Mustang S650 | 51 | +33.3342 | 12 | 36 |
| 24 | 19 | (New Zealand) Matthew Payne | Grove Racing | Ford Mustang S650 | 51 | +33.7425 | 24 | 33 |
| DNF | 26 | (Australia) David Reynolds | Grove Racing | Ford Mustang S650 | 31 | Crash damage | 11 | |
Fastest Lap: Shane van Gisbergen (Triple Eight Race Engineering), 1:30.8646

=== Qualifying 2 ===
| Pos. | No. | Driver | Team | Car | Time |
|---|---|---|---|---|---|
| 1 | 97 | (New Zealand) Shane van Gisbergen | Triple Eight Race Engineering | Chevrolet Camaro Gen6 | 1:29.9100 |
| 2 | 8 | (New Zealand) Andre Heimgartner | Brad Jones Racing | Chevrolet Camaro Gen6 | +0.0563 |
| 3 | 88 | (Australia) Broc Feeney | Triple Eight Race Engineering | Chevrolet Camaro Gen6 | +0.2067 |
| 4 | 14 | (Australia) Bryce Fullwood | Brad Jones Racing | Chevrolet Camaro Gen6 | +0.2575 |
| 5 | 99 | (Australia) Brodie Kostecki | Erebus Motorsport | Chevrolet Camaro Gen6 | +0.3052 |
| 6 | 6 | (Australia) Cam Waters | Tickford Racing | Ford Mustang S650 | +0.3361 |
| 7 | 18 | (Australia) Mark Winterbottom | Team 18 | Chevrolet Camaro Gen6 | +0.3945 |
| 8 | 26 | (Australia) David Reynolds | Grove Racing | Ford Mustang S650 | +0.4160 |
| 9 | 11 | (Australia) Anton de Pasquale | Dick Johnson Racing | Ford Mustang S650 | +0.5306 |
| 10 | 9 | (Australia) Will Brown | Erebus Motorsport | Chevrolet Camaro Gen6 | +0.5336 |
| 11 | 35 | (Australia) Cameron Hill | Matt Stone Racing | Chevrolet Camaro Gen6 | +0.5429 |
| 12 | 20 | (Australia) Scott Pye | Team 18 | Chevrolet Camaro Gen6 | +0.6046 |
| 13 | 34 | (Australia) Jack Le Brocq | Matt Stone Racing | Chevrolet Camaro Gen6 | +0.6347 |
| 14 | 96 | (Australia) Macauley Jones | Brad Jones Racing | Chevrolet Camaro Gen6 | +0.6449 |
| 15 | 5 | (Australia) James Courtney | Tickford Racing | Ford Mustang S650 | +0.6650 |
| 16 | 25 | (Australia) Chaz Mostert | Walkinshaw Andretti United | Ford Mustang S650 | +0.6737 |
| 17 | 23 | (Australia) Tim Slade | PremiAir Racing | Chevrolet Camaro Gen6 | +0.6979 |
| 18 | 3 | (Australia) Todd Hazelwood | Blanchard Racing Team | Ford Mustang S650 | +0.7354 |
| 19 | 55 | (Australia) Thomas Randle | Tickford Racing | Ford Mustang S650 | +0.7392 |
| 20 | 31 | (Australia) James Golding | PremiAir Racing | Chevrolet Camaro Gen6 | +0.8235 |
| 21 | 4 | (Australia) Jack Smith | Brad Jones Racing | Chevrolet Camaro Gen6 | +0.8762 |
| 22 | 56 | (Australia) Declan Fraser | Tickford Racing | Ford Mustang S650 | +0.8884 |
| 23 | 17 | (Australia) Will Davison | Dick Johnson Racing | Ford Mustang S650 | +0.9197 |
| 24 | 19 | (New Zealand) Matthew Payne | Grove Racing | Ford Mustang S650 | +0.9610 |
| 25 | 2 | (Australia) Nick Percat | Walkinshaw Andretti United | Ford Mustang S650 | +1.0248 |

=== Race 2 ===
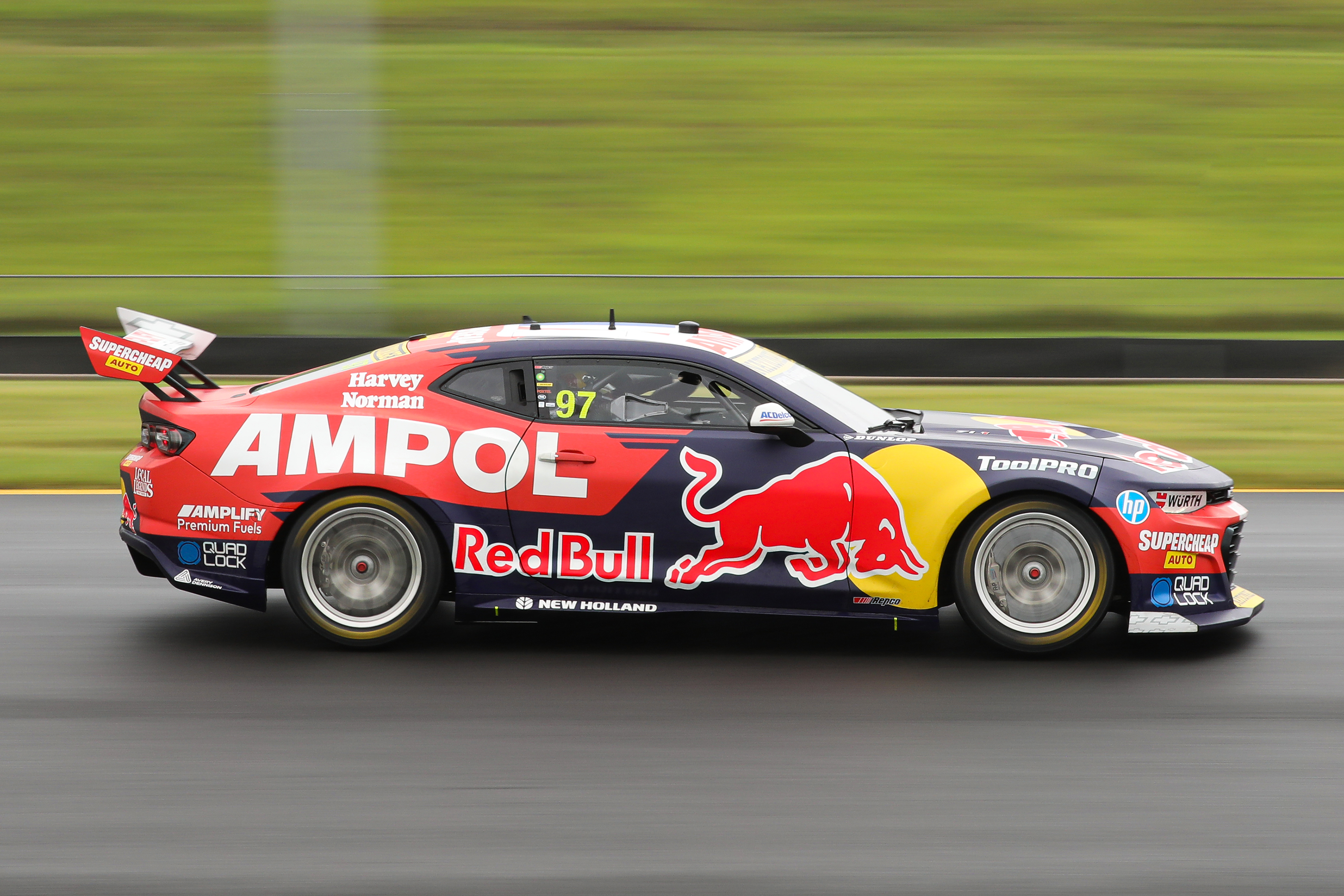
Shane van Gisbergen (pictured at the pre-season test) was victorious in Race 2.

| Pos. | No. | Driver | Team | Car | Laps | Time/Retired | Grid | Pts. |
|---|---|---|---|---|---|---|---|---|
| 1 | 97 | (New Zealand) Shane van Gisbergen | Triple Eight Race Engineering | Chevrolet Camaro Gen6 | 36 | 57:04.6373 | 1 | 150 |
| 2 | 8 | (New Zealand) Andre Heimgartner | Brad Jones Racing | Chevrolet Camaro Gen6 | 36 | +5.2275 | 2 | 138 |
| 3 | 11 | (Australia) Anton de Pasquale | Dick Johnson Racing | Ford Mustang S650 | 36 | +15.6663 | 9 | 129 |
| 4 | 88 | (Australia) Broc Feeney | Triple Eight Race Engineering | Chevrolet Camaro Gen6 | 36 | +16.0982 | 3 | 120 |
| 5 | 14 | (Australia) Bryce Fullwood | Brad Jones Racing | Chevrolet Camaro Gen6 | 36 | +18.7067 | 4 | 111 |
| 6 | 6 | (Australia) Cam Waters | Tickford Racing | Ford Mustang S650 | 36 | +19.5718 | 6 | 102 |
| 7 | 25 | (Australia) Chaz Mostert | Walkinshaw Andretti United | Ford Mustang S650 | 36 | +20.6820 | 16 | 96 |
| 8 | 99 | (Australia) Brodie Kostecki | Erebus Motorsport | Chevrolet Camaro Gen6 | 36 | +23.1046 | 5 | 90 |
| 9 | 18 | (Australia) Mark Winterbottom | Team 18 | Chevrolet Camaro Gen6 | 36 | +25.5196 | 7 | 84 |
| 10 | 34 | (Australia) Jack Le Brocq | Matt Stone Racing | Chevrolet Camaro Gen6 | 36 | +27.7387 | 13 | 78 |
| 11 | 20 | (Australia) Scott Pye | Team 18 | Chevrolet Camaro Gen6 | 36 | +30.4057 | 12 | 72 |
| 12 | 23 | (Australia) Tim Slade | PremiAir Racing | Chevrolet Camaro Gen6 | 36 | +31.5091 | 17 | 69 |
| 13 | 5 | (Australia) James Courtney | Tickford Racing | Ford Mustang S650 | 36 | +35.0350 | 15 | 66 |
| 14 | 9 | (Australia) Will Brown | Erebus Motorsport | Chevrolet Camaro Gen6 | 36 | +35.4109 | 10 | 63 |
| 15 | 4 | (Australia) Jack Smith | Brad Jones Racing | Chevrolet Camaro Gen6 | 36 | +37.2835 | 21 | 60 |
| 16 | 31 | (Australia) James Golding | PremiAir Racing | Chevrolet Camaro Gen6 | 36 | +37.4967 | 20 | 57 |
| 17 | 17 | (Australia) Will Davison | Dick Johnson Racing | Ford Mustang S650 | 36 | +38.0060 | 23 | 54 |
| 18 | 96 | (Australia) Macauley Jones | Brad Jones Racing | Chevrolet Camaro Gen6 | 36 | +42.0539 (Note: Macauley Jones received a 5-second post-race time penalty in Race 2 for a driving infringement.) | 14 | 51 |
| 19 | 2 | (Australia) Nick Percat | Walkinshaw Andretti United | Ford Mustang S650 | 36 | +43.2628 | 25 | 48 |
| 20 | 26 | (Australia) David Reynolds | Grove Racing | Ford Mustang S650 | 36 | +44.2567 | 8 | 45 |
| 21 | 3 | (Australia) Todd Hazelwood | Blanchard Racing Team | Ford Mustang S650 | 36 | +48.2905 | 18 | 42 |
| 22 | 55 | (Australia) Thomas Randle | Tickford Racing | Ford Mustang S650 | 36 | +50.3367 | 19 | 39 |
| 23 | 19 | (New Zealand) Matthew Payne | Grove Racing | Ford Mustang S650 | 36 | +51.5007 | 24 | 36 |
| 24 | 35 | (Australia) Cameron Hill | Matt Stone Racing | Chevrolet Camaro Gen6 | 36 | +55.4407 | 11 | 33 |
| 25 | 56 | (Australia) Declan Fraser | Tickford Racing | Ford Mustang S650 | 36 | +1:02.6876 | 22 | 30 |
Fastest Lap: Jack Smith (Brad Jones Racing), 1:31.8393

== Championship standings after the race ==
Drivers standings

| Pos | Driver | Pts | Gap |
|---|---|---|---|
| 1 | (Australia) Brodie Kostecki | 1590 | |
| 2 | (Australia) Will Brown | 1549 | +41 |
| 3 | (New Zealand) Shane van Gisbergen | 1536 | +54 |
| 4 | (Australia) Broc Feeney | 1523 | +67 |
| 5 | (Australia) Chaz Mostert | 1348 | +242 |

Teams standings

| Pos | Team | Pts | Gap |
|---|---|---|---|
| 1 | Erebus Motorsport | 3139 | |
| 2 | Triple Eight Race Engineering | 3059 | +80 |
| 3 | Brad Jones Racing (#8, #14) | 2354 | +785 |
| 4 | Tickford Racing (#5, #6) | 2077 | +1062 |
| 5 | Team 18 | 2028 | +1111 |

- Note: Only the top five positions are included for both sets of standings.
