= Matt Stone Racing =

Australian motor racing team

- Manufacturer: Chevrolet
- Team Principal: Matt Stone; Jason Gomersall
- Team Manager: Paul Forgie
- Race Drivers: 4. Jack Le Brocq; 10. Zach Bates
- Race Engineers: 4. Oliver Boone; 10. Caleb Mutsaerts
- Data Engineers: 4. 10.
- Chassis: Camaro ZL1
- Debut: 2018
- Drivers' Championships: 0
- Round wins: 1
- 2020 position: 1
- 12th (1561 pts)

Matt Stone Racing is an Australian racing team competing in the Supercars Championship with two Chevrolet Camaro ZL1s. Jack Le Brocq drives the No. 4 car, while Zach Bates drives the No. 10 car.

== Supercars Championship ==
Matt Stone Racing moved up into the Supercars Championship for 2018 with Todd Hazelwood. The team started in a Ford FG X Falcon previously owned by DJR Team Penske before switching to their Super 2 winning Holden VF Commodore from The Bend onwards. In 2019 the team upgraded to an ex-Triple Eight Racing Engineering ZB Commodore. Having leased a Racing Entitlement Contract (REC) from Jason Bright for the 2018 and 2019 seasons.

In 2020 the team expanded to two cars having purchased RECs from Garry Rogers Motorsport and Kelly Racing. The new for 2020 number 34 was split between Jake Kostecki and Zane Goddard under the new Superlite Program. The two would also drive together for the Bathurst 1000. The 35 car was driven full time by Garry Jacobson, partnered with David Russell for the Endurance race. Jacobson finished 21st in the championship, with Goddard 25th and Kostecki 27th.

== Super 2 Series ==
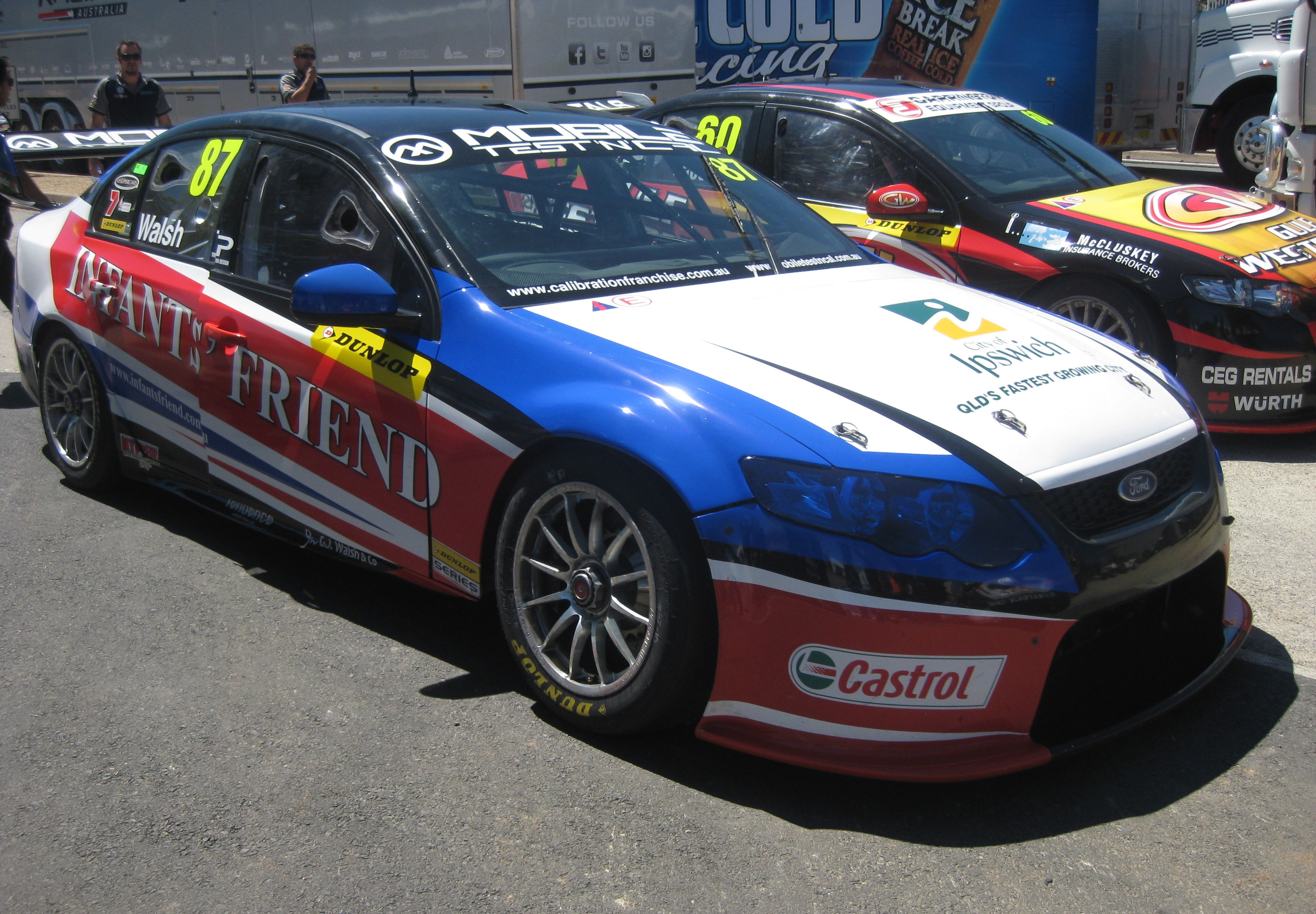
Matt Stone Racing Ford FG Falcon in which Ashley Walsh placed second in the 2013 Dunlop V8 Supercar Series

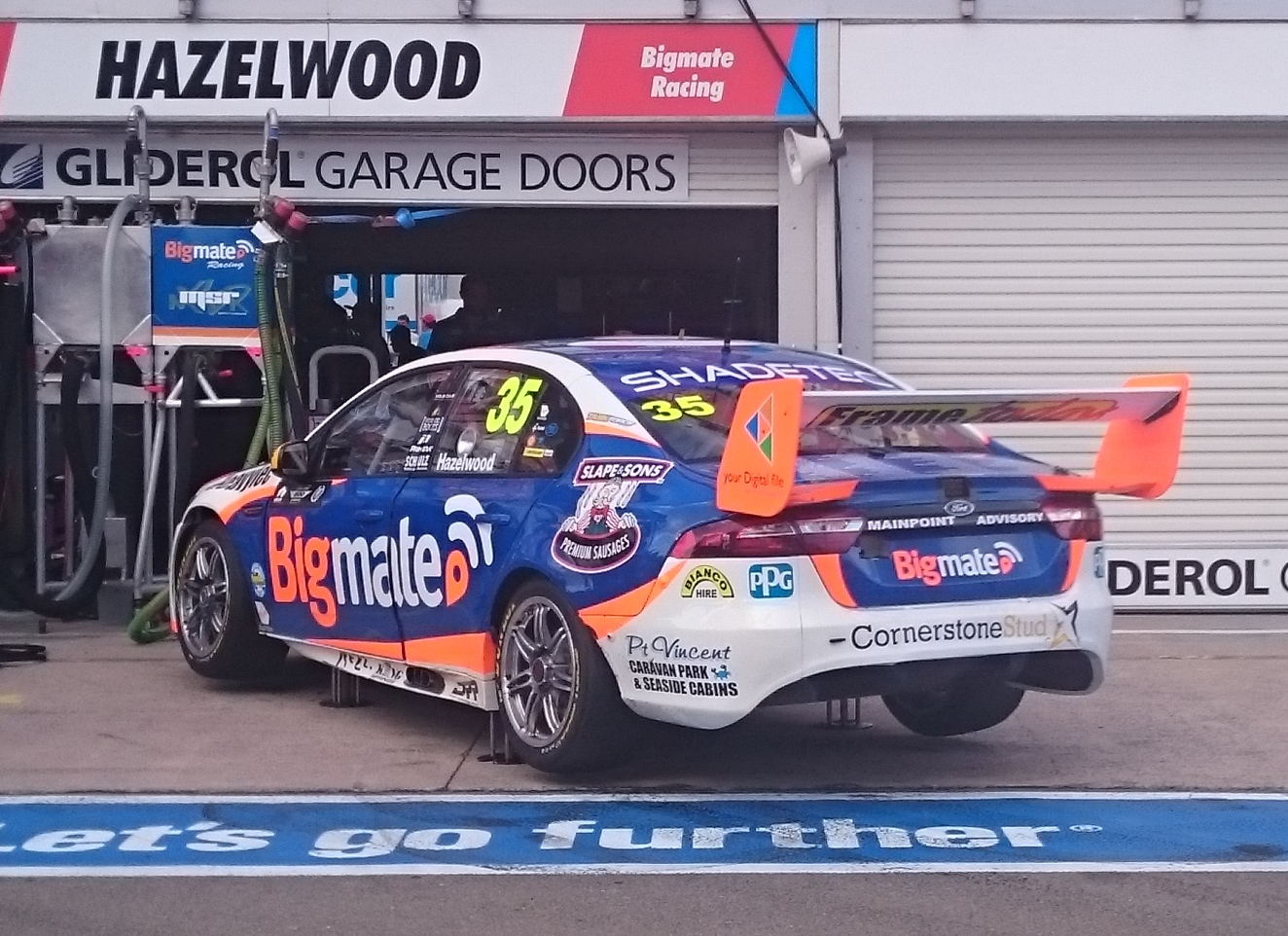
Todd Hazelwood contested the 2018 Supercars Championship driving a Ford Falcon FG X (pictured) and a Holden Commodore VF for Matt Stone Racing

In 2011, Matt Stone the son of Stone Brothers Racing (SBR) co-owner Jim, was given the opportunity to run a former SBR Ford BF Falcon in the 2011 development series with Robert Cregan driving. In 2012, the team expanded to two Falcon BFs, with Daniel Jilesen and Ashley Walsh joining the team. After two rounds the team expanded to three cars, with the SBR entered Ford FG Falcon of Scott McLaughlin entry transferred to the team after the signing of Mahindra Group as a minor sponsor, conflicted with SBR's Ford sponsorship. McLaughlin went on to win the series. In 2013, the team entered three Falcon FGs with Michael Hector, George Miedecke and Ashley Walsh driving. In 2014, the team again fielded three FGs with Todd Hazelwood, Michael Hector and Ashley Walsh driving. Steven Johnson drove a fourth car at the Townsville and Queensland rounds. Ryal Harris drove the fourth car at Bathurst. Shae Davies replaced Hector for the final round in Sydney. In 2015, the team only fielded two FG Falcons, with Todd Hazelwood and Shae Davies competing in all of the rounds, finishing the championship in 4th and 8th places respectively. In 2016, the team purchased a Holden VF Commodore for Hazelwood. Adam Marjoram joined the team and raced in an FG Falcon. Hazelwood finished the year in 3rd place, while Marjoram finished in 13th.

In 2017, the team purchased another VF Commodore for Marjoram. Brodie Kostecki joined the team and raced an FG Falcon. Hazelwood won 6 races and was able to win the championship by 95 points. Kostecki finished in 15th, while Marjoram came 18th for the year.

For 2018, Bryce Fullwood joined the team in an ex-DJR Team Penske Ford FG X Falcon, but switched to a VF Commodore after the Perth round. During the first 3 rounds the Commodore was raced by Tyler Greenbury and Jaie Robinson respectively.

For 2019 Ash Walsh would contest the full season. Abbie Eaton entered the first round and Joel Heinrich entered rounds one and two for the team, David Russell would contest the Bathurst round. Walsh finished 9th for the year.

For 2021 MSR had signed Glenn Seton's son Aaron Seton.

For 2022 MSR had signed 2x SuperUtes Series champion Ryal Harris alongside Aaron Seton.

== TCR Australia ==
For the 2019 TCR Australia Touring Car Series the team would enter 2 Volkswagen Golfs in collaboration with former supercars driver Jason Bright known as Alliance Autosport. The 2 drivers would be Bright and New Zealand based Australian Alexandra Whitley. Bright would win the opening race at Sydney and would win another race at round 5 at Winton. Whitley would have more mixed results with only 3 top 10's. The team would hand over running of the cars to Melbourne Performance Centre for rounds 6 & 7.

== Touring Car Masters ==
In 2016 the team entered the Touring Car Masters. Team Owner Jason Gomersall was entered in a Holden Torana Coupe for the full season, along with Darren Beale entered for rounds 3 through 8 in a Holden Monaro GTS. Gomersall would go on to win the Pro Am Category.

For 2016 the team would keep Gomersall and Beale, adding Bob Wisely for select rounds in another Torana. Gomersall would finish 4th in the Pro Masters class, taking his first outright win at Winton. Beale would win the Pro Sports category, with Wisely finishing 3rd in Pro Sports despite missing a round, and failing to start the final two races at Bathurst after retiring from the first.

For the 2018 Season the team would downsize to running Gomersall as their only full time entrant. Beale would contest only a single round. Gomersall would again finish 4th overall in the Pro Masters class, taking another race win.

In 2019 Gomersall would enter only select race, electing to instead focus on his debut in the 2019 Kumho Super 3 Series. He would enter 8 races, taking 2 podiums on his way to 8th in the Pro Masters class.

== GT Racing ==
In 2016 and 2017 Matt Stone Racing collaborated with Miedecke Motorsport to run Aston Martins in GT3 configuration. The highlights for the team were winning the Sydney Motorsport Park 101 as part of the 2016 Australian Endurance Championship and a fourth place in the top-ten shootout of the 2017 Liqui Moly Bathurst 12 Hour. The team would record a DNF after a crash 75 laps into the race.

Additionally in 2016, Matt Stone Racing would enter rounds 3 & 4 of the 2016 GT Asia Series. George Miedecke would contest both races, partnered by Nathan Morcom for round 3, and Ashley Walsh for round 4.

== V8 Utes Racing Series ==
In 2014 the team stepped into the V8 Utes Series, beginning at the 5th round at Sandown. They took over the preparation and running of Reigning Champion, Ryal Harris' Ute. The team scored a win on debut and went on to finish 5th overall for the year.

For 2015, Harris Stayed on with the team, and was teamed up with George Miedecke. A third car was run, with rounds split between Grant Johnson, Aaren Russell, Chris Pither, Kurt Kostecki, & Todd Hazelwood. The team won their first championship, with Ryal Harris taking the crown, Miedecke ended the year 6th.

In 2016 the team ran Ryal Harris on a part-time basis, entering 5 rounds and taking 2 race wins along the way. Harris would finish 11th overall in the championship.

== Results ==
=== Stats ===
Year	Driver	Race Starts	Race wins	Podiums
2017–2019, 2022	(Australia) Todd Hazelwood	97	0	0
2018	(Australia) Bryce Fullwood	3	0	0
2019	(Australia) Jack Smith	5	0	0
2020	(Australia) Garry Jacobson	27	0	0
2020–2021	(Australia) Zane Goddard	45	0	0
2020–2021	(Australia) Jake Kostecki	43	0	0
2020	(Australia) David Russell	27	0	0
2021–2023	(Australia) Jayden Ojeda	4	0	0
2021	(Australia) Kurt Kostecki	1	0	0
2022–2023, 2026–present	(Australia) Jack Le Brocq	96	1	1
2022, 2025-present	(Australia) Aaron Seton	11	0	1
2023–2025	(Australia) Cameron Hill	85	1	3
2024–2025	(Australia) Nick Percat	57	2	5
2024–present	(Australia) Cameron Crick	4	0	0
2024	(Australia) Dylan O'Keeffe	2	0	0
2025	(Australia) Tim Slade	2	0	0
2025	(Australia) Cameron McLeod	2	0	0
2026–present	(Australia) Zach Bates	34	0	1
2026–present	(Australia) Harri Jones	2	0	0

=== Car No. 4 results ===
Year	Driver	No.	Make	1	2	3	4	5	6	7	8	9	10	11	12	13	14	15	16	17	18	19	20	21	22	23	24	25	26	27	28	29	30	31	32	33	34	35	36	37	Position	Pts
2017	Todd Hazelwood	35	Holden	ADE; R1	ADE; R2	SYM; R3	SYM; R4	PHI; R5	PHI; R6	BAR; R7	BAR; R8	WIN; R9	WIN; R10	HID; R11	HID; R12	TOW; R13	TOW; R14	QLD; R15; 22	QLD; R16; 18	SMP; R17	SMP; R18	SAN; Q	SAN; R19	BAT; R20	SUR; R21	SUR; R22	PUK; R23	PUK; R24	NEW; R25	NEW; R26											54th	90
2018	Todd Hazelwood	35	Ford	ADE; R1; 22	ADE; R2; 21	MEL; R3; 22	MEL; R4; Ret	MEL; R5; 18	MEL; R6; 19	SYM; R7; 22	SYM; R8; 20	PHI; R9; 23	PHI; R10; 24	BAR; R11; 22	BAR; R12; 25	WIN; R13; 21	WIN; R14; 25	HID; R15; 25	HID; R16; 24	TOW; R17; 20	TOW; R18; 23	QLD; R19; 27	QLD; R20; 23	SMP; R21; 24																	26th	1201
2018	Todd Hazelwood	35	Holden																						BEN; R22; 26	BEN; R23; 25	SAN; QR; 23	SAN; R24; 21	BAT; R25; 20	SUR; R26; 20	SUR; R27; C	PUK; R28; 24	PUK; R29; 25	NEW; R30; 13	NEW; R31; 21						26th	1201
2019	Todd Hazelwood	35	Holden	ADE; R1; 12	ADE; R2; 10	MEL; R3; 23	MEL; R4; 17	MEL; R5; 14	MEL; R6; 13	SYM; R7; 14	SYM; R8; 18	PHI; R9; 11	PHI; R10; 16	BAR; R11; 23	BAR; R12; 14	WIN; R13; 19	WIN; R14; 15	HID; R15; 18	HID; R16; 13	TOW; R17; 14	TOW; R18; 16	QLD; R19; 19	QLD; R20; 13	BEN; R21; Ret	BEN; R22; 14	PUK; R23; 14	PUK; R24; 5	BAT; R25; Ret	SUR; R26; 20	SUR; R27; 20	SAN; QR; 11	SAN; R28; 20	NEW; R29; 18	NEW; R30; 10							18th	1609
2020	Garry Jacobson	35	Holden	ADE; R1; Ret	ADE; R2; 20	MEL; R3; C	MEL; R4; C	MEL; R5; C	MEL; R6; C	SMP1; R7; 16	SMP1; R8; 21	SMP1; R9; 19	SMP2; R10; 22	SMP2; R11; 7	SMP2; R12; 24	HID1; R13; 19	HID1; R14; 19	HID1; R15; 13	HID2; R16; 22	HID2; R17; 24	HID2; R18; 16	TOW1; R19; 14	TOW1; R20; 16	TOW1; R21; 18	TOW2; R22; 15	TOW2; R23; 17	TOW2; R24; 20	BEN1; R25; 19	BEN1; R26; 22	BEN1; R27; 13	BEN2; R28; 18	BEN2; R29; Ret	BEN2; R30; 21	BAT; R31; Ret							21st	833
2021	Zane Goddard	35	Holden	BAT; R1; 12	BAT; R2; 16	SAN; R3; 19	SAN; R4; 16	SAN; R5; 21	SYM; R6; 18	SYM; R7; 18	SYM; R8; 7	BEN; R9; 18	BEN; R10; 20	BEN; R11; 21	HID; R12; 16	HID; R13; 21	HID; R14; 23	TOW; R15; 24	TOW; R16; 18	TOW2; R17; 12	TOW2; R18; 22	TOW2; R19; 19	SYD1; R20; 24	SYD1; R21; 20	SYD1; R22; 22	SYD2; R23; 21	SYD2; R24; 22	SYD2; R25; 13	SYD3; R26; 8	SYD3; R27; 11	SYD3; R28; 17	SYD4; R29; 19	SYD4; R30; C	BAT; R31; Ret							20th	1088
2022	Todd Hazelwood	35	Holden	SMP; R1; 14	SMP; R2; 13	SYM; R3; 10	SYM; R4; 10	SYM; R5; 5	MEL; R6; 19	MEL; R7; 5	MEL; R8; 14	MEL; R9; 14	BAR; R10; 9	BAR; R11; 10	BAR; R12; 8	WIN; R13; 23	WIN; R14; 17	WIN; R15; 18	HID; R16; 16	HID; R17; 24	HID; R18; 23	TOW; R19; 21	TOW; R20; 15	BEN; R21; 18	BEN; R22; 17	BEN; R23; 21	SAN; R24; 21	SAN; R25; 24	SAN; R26; 24	PUK; R27; 15	PUK; R28; 20	PUK; R29; 23	BAT; R30; 20	SUR; R31; 18	SUR; R32; Ret	ADE; R33; Ret	ADE; R34; 21				18th	1345
2023	Cameron Hill	35	Chevrolet	NEW; R1; 20	NEW; R2; 21	MEL; R3; 18	MEL; R4; 15	MEL; R5; 17	MEL; R6; Ret	BAR; R7; 23	BAR; R8; 25	BAR; R9; 16	SYM; R10; 8	SYM; R11; 11	SYM; R12; 11	HID; R13; 13	HID; R14; 15	HID; R15; 16	TOW; R16; 17	TOW; R17; 22	SMP; R18; 17	SMP; R19; 24	BEN; R20; Ret	BEN; R21; 20	BEN; R22; 19	SAN; R23; Ret	BAT; R24; 15	SUR; R25; 23	SUR; R26; 15	ADE; R27; 20	ADE; R28; 19										23rd	1080
2024	Cameron Hill	4	Chevrolet	BAT1; R1; 5	BAT1; R2; 23	MEL; R3; 13	MEL; R4; 20	MEL; R5; 15	MEL; R6; Ret	TAU; R7; 20	TAU; R8; 12	BAR; R9; 11	BAR; R10; 11	HID; R11; 16	HID; R12; 9	TOW; R13; 10	TOW; R14; 9	SMP; R15; 11	SMP; R16; 14	SYM; R17; 6	SYM; R18; 12	SAN; R19; 10	BAT; R20; 10	SUR; R21; 23	SUR; R22; 14	ADE; R23; 18	ADE; R24; 16														12th	1615
2025	Cameron Hill	4	Chevrolet	SMP; R1; 13	SMP; R2; 13	SMP; R3; 21	MEL; R4; 3	MEL; R5; 1	MEL; R6; 9	MEL; R7; C	TAU; R8; 14	TAU; R9; 13	TAU; R10; 2	SYM; R11; 13	SYM; R12; 23	SYM; R13; 10	BAR; R14; 9	BAR; R15; 12	BAR; R16; 23	HID; R17; 12	HID; R18; 13	HID; R19; 9	TOW; R20; 14	TOW; R21; 12	TOW; R22; 24	QLD; R23; 7	QLD; R24; 16	QLD; R25; 24	BEN; R26; 11	BAT; R27; 5	SUR; R28; Ret	SUR; R29; 18	SAN; R30; 15	SAN; R31; 24	ADE; R32; 18	ADE; R33; 21	ADE; R34; 8				12th	1515
2026	Jack Le Brocq	4	Chevrolet	SYD; R1; 17	SYD; R2; 9	SYD; R3; 6	MEL; R4; 13	MEL; R5; 6	MEL; R6; 10	MEL; R7; 4	TAU; R8; 9	TAU; R9; 11	CHR; R10; 15	CHR; R11; 12	CHR; R12; 9	CHR; R13; 7	SYM; R14; 17	SYM; R15; 11	SYM; R16; 24	HID; R17; 24	HID; R18; 9	HID; R19; 8	TOW; R20	TOW; R21	TOW; R22	BAR; R23	BAR; R24	BAR; R25	QLD; R26	QLD; R27	QLD; R28	BEN; R28	BAT; R30	SUR; R31	SUR; R32	SAN; R33	SAN; R34	ADE; R35	ADE; R36	ADE; R37	11th*	832*

=== Car No. 10 results ===
Year	Driver	No.	Make	1	2	3	4	5	6	7	8	9	10	11	12	13	14	15	16	17	18	19	20	21	22	23	24	25	26	27	28	29	30	31	32	33	34	35	36	37	Position	Pts
2020	Zane Goddard	34	Holden	ADE; R1; 18	ADE; R2; 16	MEL; R3; C	MEL; R4; C	MEL; R5; C	MEL; R6; C	SMP1; R7	SMP1; R8	SMP1; R9	SMP2; R10; 24	SMP2; R11; 24	SMP2; R12; 10	HID1; R13	HID1; R14	HID1; R15	HID2; R16; 21	HID2; R17; 21	HID2; R18; 21	TOW1; R19; Ret	TOW1; R20; 21	TOW1; R21; 19	TOW2; R22	TOW2; R23	TOW2; R24	BEN1; R25; 16	BEN1; R26; 24	BEN1; R27; 20	BEN2; R28	BEN2; R29	BEN2; R30	BAT; R31; Ret							25th	438
2020	Jake Kostecki	34	Holden	ADE; R1	ADE; R2	MEL; R3; C	MEL; R4; C	MEL; R5; C	MEL; R6; C	SMP1; R7; 22	SMP1; R8; 24	SMP1; R9; 22	SMP2; R10	SMP2; R11	SMP2; R12	HID1; R13; Ret	HID1; R14; 22	HID1; R15; 14	HID1; R16	HID1; R17	HID1; R18	TOW1; R19	TOW1; R20	TOW1; R21	TOW2; R22; 20	TOW2; R23; 23	TOW2; R24; 22	BEN1; R25	BEN1; R26	BEN1; R27	BEN2; R28; Ret	BEN2; R29; 16	BEN2; R30; 20	BAT; R31; Ret							27th	290
2021	Jake Kostecki	34	Holden	BAT; R1; 13	BAT; R2; 17	SAN; R3; 23	SAN; R4; 18	SAN; R5; 14	SYM; R6; 13	SYM; R7; 15	SYM; R8; 21	BEN; R9; 21	BEN; R10; 18	BEN; R11; 16	HID; R12; 5	HID; R13; 24	HID; R14; 25	TOW1; R15; 19	TOW1; R16; DSQ	TOW2; R17; 16	TOW2; R18; 13	TOW2; R19; 14	SYD1; R20; 23	SYD1; R21; 21	SYD1; R22; 17	SYD2; R23; 16	SYD2; R24; 21	SYD2; R25; Ret	SYD3; R26; 17	SYD3; R27; 22	SYD3; R28; 16	SYD4; R29; 18	SYD4; R30; C	BAT; R31; 13							19th	1157
2022	Jack Le Brocq	34	Holden	SMP; R1; 13	SMP; R2; 22	SYM; R3; Ret	SYM; R4; Ret	SYM; R5; 23	MEL; R6; 25	MEL; R7; 15	MEL; R8; 12	MEL; R9; 16	BAR; R10; 16	BAR; R11; 17	BAR; R12; 13	WIN; R13; 18	WIN; R14; 13	WIN; R15; 17	HID; R16; 13	HID; R17; 6	HID; R18; 13	TOW; R19; 10	TOW; R20; 14	BEN; R21; 21	BEN; R22; 15	BEN; R23; Ret	SAN; R24; 19	SAN; R25; 25	SAN; R26; Ret	PUK; R27; 23	PUK; R28; Ret	PUK; R29; 21	BAT; R30; 14	SUR; R31; 13	SUR; R32; 16	ADE; R33; 18	ADE; R34; Ret				21st	1237
2023	Jack Le Brocq	34	Chevrolet	NEW; R1; 9	NEW; R2; 8	MEL; R3; 8	MEL; R4; Ret	MEL; R5; 6	MEL; R6; 5	BAR; R7; 12	BAR; R8; 15	BAR; R9; 24	SYM; R10; 7	SYM; R11; 8	SYM; R12; 5	HID; R13; 11	HID; R14; 20	HID; R15; 1	TOW; R16; 12	TOW; R17; 10	SMP; R18; 4	SMP; R19; 10	BEN; R20; 15	BEN; R21; 25	BEN; R22; 10	SAN; R23; 16	BAT; R24; 9	SUR; R25; Ret	SUR; R26; 14	ADE; R27; 14	ADE; R28; 23										12th	1715
2024	Nick Percat	10	Chevrolet	BAT1; R1; 6	BAT1; R2; 9	MEL; R3; 6	MEL; R4; 6	MEL; R5; 9	MEL; R6; 1	TAU; R7; 19	TAU; R8; 16	BAR; R9; 7	BAR; R10; 21	HID; R11; 7	HID; R12; 5	TOW; R13; 21	TOW; R14; 20	SMP; R15; 8	SMP; R16; 8	SYM; R17; 1	SYM; R18; 7	SAN; R19; 23	BAT2; R20; 17	SUR; R21; 12	SUR; R22; 22	ADE; R23; 14	ADE; R24; 5														8th	1830
2025	Nick Percat	10	Chevrolet	SMP; R1; 12	SMP; R2; 21	SMP; R3; 15	MEL; R4; 13	MEL; R5; 2	MEL; R6; 3	MEL; R7; C	TAU; R8; 19	TAU; R9; 15	TAU; R10; 23	SYM; R11; 20	SYM; R12; 2	SYM; R13; 9	BAR; R14; 12	BAR; R15; 8	BAR; R16; 17	HID; R17; 7	HID; R18; 11	HID; R19; 16	TOW; R20; 22	TOW; R21; 14	TOW; R22; 12	QLD; R23; 18	QLD; R24; 13	QLD; R25; 22	BEN; R26; 5	BAT; R27; Ret	SUR; R28; 18	SUR; R29; 22	SAN; R30; 23	SAN; R31; 19	ADE; R32; 14	ADE; R33; 18	ADE; R34; 22				16th	1286
2026	Zach Bates	10	Chevrolet	SYD; R1	SYD; R2	SYD; R3	MEL; R4	MEL; R5	MEL; R6	MEL; R7	TAU; R8	TAU; R9	TAU; R10	CHR; R11	CHR; R12	CHR; R13	SYM; R14	SYM; R15	SYM; R16	BAR; R17	BAR; R18	BAR; R19	HID; R20	HID; R21	HID; R22	TOW; R23	TOW; R24	TOW; R25	QLD; R26	QLD; R27	QLD; R28	BEN; R28	BAT; R30	SUR; R31	SUR; R32	SAN; R33	SAN; R34	ADE; R35	ADE; R36	ADE; R37		

=== Complete Bathurst 1000 results ===
Year	No.	Car	Drivers	Position	Laps
2018	35	Holden Commodore VF	(Australia) Todd Hazelwood (Australia) Bryce Fullwood	20th	159
2019	35	Holden Commodore ZB	(Australia) Todd Hazelwood (Australia) Jack Smith	DNF	98
2020	34	Holden Commodore ZB	(Australia) Jake Kostecki (Australia) Zane Goddard	DNF	155
2020	35	Holden Commodore ZB	(Australia) Garry Jacobson (Australia) David Russell	DNF	62
2021	34	Holden Commodore ZB	(Australia) Jake Kostecki (Australia) Kurt Kostecki	13th	161
2021	35	Holden Commodore ZB	(Australia) Zane Goddard (Australia) Jayden Ojeda	DNF	113
2022	34	Holden Commodore ZB	(Australia) Jack Le Brocq (Australia) Aaron Seton	14th	161
2022	35	Holden Commodore ZB	(Australia) Todd Hazelwood (Australia) Jayden Ojeda	20th	159
2023	34	Chevrolet Camaro ZL1-1LE	(Australia) Jack Le Brocq (Australia) Jayden Ojeda	9th	161
2023	35	Chevrolet Camaro ZL1-1LE	(Australia) Cameron Hill (Australia) Jaylyn Robotham	15th	161
2024	4	Chevrolet Camaro ZL1-1LE	(Australia) Cameron Hill (Australia) Cameron Crick	10th	161
2024	10	Chevrolet Camaro ZL1-1LE	(Australia) Nick Percat (Australia) Dylan O'Keeffe	17th	161
2025	4	Chevrolet Camaro ZL1-1LE	(Australia) Cameron Hill (Australia) Cameron McLeod	5th	161
2025	10	Chevrolet Camaro ZL1-1LE	(Australia) Nick Percat (Australia) Tim Slade	Ret	50
2025	35	Chevrolet Camaro ZL1-1LE	(Australia) Cameron Crick (Australia) Aaron Seton	15th	161
2026	4	Chevrolet Camaro ZL1-1LE	(Australia) Jack Le Brocq (Australia) Harri Jones	4th	161
2026	10	Chevrolet Camaro ZL1-1LE	(Australia) Zach Bates (Australia) Aaron Seton	3rd	161

== Supercars Championship drivers ==
The following is a list of drivers who have driven for the team in V8 Supercars, in order of their first appearance. Drivers who only drove for the team in an endurance race co-driver basis are listed in italics.

- (Australia) Todd Hazelwood (2017–19, 2022)
- (Australia) Bryce Fullwood (2018)
- (Australia) Jack Smith (2019)
- (Australia) Garry Jacobson (2020)
- (Australia) Zane Goddard (2020–21)
- (Australia) Jake Kostecki (2020–21)
- (Australia) David Russell (2020)
- (Australia) Jayden Ojeda (2021-2023)
- (Australia) Kurt Kostecki (2021)
- (Australia) Jack Le Brocq (2022–2023, 2026-present)
- (Australia) Aaron Seton (2022, 2025-present)
- (Australia) Cameron Hill (2023–2025)
- (Australia) Nick Percat (2024–2025)
- (Australia) Cameron Crick (2024-present)
- (Australia) Dylan O'Keeffe (2024)
- (Australia) Tim Slade (2025)
- (Australia) Cameron McLeod (2025)
- (Australia) Zach Bates (2026-present)
- (Australia) Harri Jones (2026-present)

== Super2 Championship drivers ==
- (Australia) Stephen Voight (2011)
- (Republic of Ireland) Robert Cregan (2011)
- (New Zealand) Daniel Jilesen (2012)
- (Australia) Ashley Walsh (2012–14, 2019)
- (New Zealand) Scott McLaughlin (2012)
- (Australia) George Miedecke (2013)
- (Australia) Michael Hector (2013–14)
- (Australia) Todd Hazelwood (2014–17)
- (Australia) Shae Davies (2014–15)
- (Australia) Ryal Harris (2014, 2016, 2022)
- (Australia) Steven Johnson (2014)
- (Australia) Adam Marjoram (2016–17)
- (Australia) Bryce Fullwood (2018)
- (Australia) Tyler Greenbury (2018)
- (Australia) Jaie Robson (2018)
- (United Kingdom) Abbie Eaton (2019)
- (Australia) David Russell (2019)
- (Australia) Joel Heinrich (2019)
- (Australia) Aaron Seton (2021–2022)
- (Australia) Tommy Smith (2026)
- (New Zealand) Ayrton Hodson (2026–present)
- (Australia) Declan Fraser (2026)
