= List of Australian Touring Car and V8 Supercar driver records =

This is a list of driver records in the Australian Touring Car Championship and V8 Supercars. Drivers competing full-time in the 2025 Supercars Championship are highlighted in bold text, whilst part-time drivers are highlighted in italics. This page is accurate as of the 2025 Sandown 500 round.

== Races started ==
=== Total event starts ===
	Driver	Seasons	Starts
1	(Australia) Craig Lowndes	1996, 1998–2025	306
2	(Australia) Garth Tander	1998–2025	294
3	(Australia) Mark Winterbottom	2003–2025	289
4	(Australia) **Will Davison**	2004–2025	269
4	(Australia) **James Courtney**	2005–2025	269
5	(Australia) Rick Kelly	2001–2020	265
6	(Australia) Jason Bright	1997–2018	260
7	(Australia) Jamie Whincup	2002–2025	259
8	(Australia) Russell Ingall	1996–2016, 2021	254
9	(Australia) Todd Kelly	1999–2017	243
10	(Australia) Lee Holdsworth	2004–2025	233

=== Total race starts ===
	Driver	Seasons	Starts
1	(Australia) Craig Lowndes	1996, 1998–2025	681
2	(Australia) Garth Tander	1998–2025	648
3	(Australia) Mark Winterbottom	2003–2025	647
4	(Australia) **James Courtney**	2005–2025	608
5	(Australia) **Will Davison**	2004–2025	601
6	(Australia) Russell Ingall	1996–2016, 2021	588
7	(Australia) Rick Kelly	2001–2020	580
8	(Australia) Jason Bright	1997–2018	578
9	(Australia) Jamie Whincup	2002–2025	561
10	(Australia) Lee Holdsworth	2004–2025	516

=== Youngest drivers to start a race ===
	Driver	Age	Place	Round
1	(Australia) Alex Rullo	16 years, 262 days	23rd	2017 Adelaide 500
2	(Australia) Paul Dumbrell	16 years, 339 days	26th	1999 Symmons Plains
3	(Australia) Graham Gulson	17 years, 55 days	?	1987 Calder Park
4	(Australia) **Cam Waters**	17 years, 67 days	NC	2011 Bathurst 1000
5	(Australia) Bryan Sala	17 years, 257 days	?	1992 Sandown 500
6	(Australia) Brooke Tatnell	17 years, 284 days	?	1989 Oran Park
7	(Australia) Layton Crambrook	19 years, 182 days	19th	1999 Calder Park
8	(Australia) **Broc Feeney**	18 years, 0 days	10th	2020 Bathurst 1000
9	(Australia) Kurt Kostecki	18 years, 5 days	25th	2016 Townsville 400
10	(Australia) Tim Grant	18 years, 44 days	Ret	1990 Lakeside

== Race wins ==
=== Total race wins ===
	Driver	Seasons	Wins
1	(Australia) Jamie Whincup	2002–2025	125
2	(Australia) Craig Lowndes	1996, 1998–2025	110
3	(Australia) Mark Skaife	1987–2011	90
4	(New Zealand) Shane van Gisbergen	2007–2023	80
5	(Australia) Garth Tander	1998–2025	58
6	(New Zealand) Scott McLaughlin	2012–2020	56
7	(Australia) Peter Brock	1972–1997, 2002, 2004	48
8	(Australia) Glenn Seton	1984, 1986–2008, 2010	40
8	(Australia) Mark Winterbottom	2003–2025	40
10	(Canada) Allan Moffat	1965, 1970–1979, 1982–1984, 1988–1989	36

=== Most race wins with a single team ===
	Driver	Team	Seasons	Wins
1	(Australia) Jamie Whincup	Triple Eight Race Engineering	2002–2025	125
2	(Australia) Shane van Gisbergen	Triple Eight Race Engineering	2017–2023	69
3	(Australia) Mark Skaife	Holden Racing Team	1999–2008	66
4	(Australia) Craig Lowndes	Triple Eight Race Engineering	2005–2025	58
5	(Australia) Craig Lowndes	Holden Racing Team	1996–2000	49
6	(New Zealand) Scott McLaughlin	DJR Team Penske	2017–2020	48
7	(Australia) Mark Winterbottom	Tickford Racing	2006–2018	38
8	(Australia) Glenn Seton	Glenn Seton Racing	1989–2002	37

=== Most race wins in a season ===
	Driver	Season	Wins	Races	Percentage
1	(New Zealand) Shane van Gisbergen	2022	21	34	61.76%
2	(New Zealand) Scott McLaughlin	2019	18	32	56.25%
3	(Australia) Craig Lowndes	1996	16	30	53.33%
4	(Australia) Mark Skaife	2002	15	29	51.72%
4	(Australia) Garth Tander	2007	15	37	40.54%
4	(Australia) Jamie Whincup	2008	15	37	40.54%
7	(Australia) Craig Lowndes	1998	14	30	46.67%
7	(Australia) Jamie Whincup	2014	14	38	36.84%
7	(New Zealand) Shane van Gisbergen	2021	14	31	45.16%
7	(Australia) Broc Feeney	2025	14	34	41.18%
10	(New Zealand) Scott McLaughlin	2020	13	31	41.94%

=== Wins from farthest back on the starting grid ===
	Driver	Start position	Race
1	(Australia) Mark Skaife	38th	2000 Adelaide 500 Race 2
2	(Australia) Mark Skaife	30th	2006 Oran Park Race 2
3	(Australia) David Besnard	29th	2004 Tasmania 440 Race 3
4	(Australia) **Chaz Mostert** (Australia) Paul Morris	25th	2014 Bathurst 1000
5	(Australia) Jonathon Webb	21st	2010 Sydney 500 Race 1
6	(Australia) Jamie Whincup	20th	2010 Winton round Race 1
7	(New Zealand) Scott McLaughlin	19th	2018 Perth SuperSprint Race 2
8	(New Zealand) **Matt Payne** (Australia) Garth Tander	18th	2025 Bathurst 1000
9	(New Zealand) Shane van Gisbergen	17th	2021 Sandown SuperSprint Race 1
9	(Australia) **Will Davison** (Australia) Jonathon Webb	17th	2016 Bathurst 1000
9	(Australia) Rick Kelly	17th	2004 Eastern Creek

=== Most race wins at the same circuit ===
	Driver	Circuit	Wins
1	(Australia) Craig Lowndes	Barbagallo Raceway	16
2	(Australia) Mark Skaife	Oran Park Raceway	15
3	(Australia) Jamie Whincup	Symmons Plains Raceway	13
4	(Australia) Craig Lowndes	Queensland Raceway	12
4	(Australia) Jamie Whincup	Townsville Street Circuit	12
6	(Australia) Craig Lowndes	Sandown Raceway	11
6	(Australia) Craig Lowndes	Phillip Island Grand Prix Circuit	11
6	(Australia) Jamie Whincup	Adelaide Street Circuit	11
9	(Australia) Craig Lowndes	Symmons Plains Raceway	10
9	(Australia) Mark Skaife	Sydney Motorsport Park	10
9	(Australia) Jamie Whincup	Sandown Raceway	10
9	(New Zealand) Shane van Gisbergen	Townsville Street Circuit	10

=== Most race wins without a championship ===
	Driver	Seasons	Wins	Best finish
2	(New Zealand) Greg Murphy	1997–2014, 2022	28	2nd in 2002 and 2003
1	(Australia) **Broc Feeney**	2020–2025	33	2nd in 2024
3	(Australia) **Will Davison**	2004–2025	22	2nd in 2009
4	(Australia) Jason Bright	1997–2018	20	3rd in 2001 and 2004
5	(Australia) Todd Kelly	1999–2017	19	4th in 2005
6	(Australia) **Cam Waters**	2011–2025	18	2nd in 2020 and 2022
7	(New Zealand) Fabian Coulthard	2002–2025	13	3rd in 2017
8	(Australia) Allan Grice	1973–1984, 1987, 1991, 1995, 2002	12	3rd in 1975
9	(New Zealand) Steven Richards	1996–2019	10	5th in 2004

== Pole positions ==
=== Total pole positions ===
	Driver	Poles
1	(Australia) Jamie Whincup	92
2	(New Zealand) Scott McLaughlin	76
3	(Australia) Peter Brock	57
4	(Australia) Craig Lowndes	43
5	(Australia) Mark Skaife	41
5	(New Zealand) Shane van Gisbergen	41
7	(Canada) Allan Moffat	39
8	(Australia) Mark Winterbottom	36
9	(Australia) Broc Feeney	31
10	(Australia) Dick Johnson	28

== Podiums ==
=== Total podiums ===
	Driver	Podiums
1	(Australia) Jamie Whincup	240
2	(New Zealand) Shane van Gisbergen	177
3	(Australia) Craig Lowndes	169
4	(Australia) Mark Winterbottom	121
5	(Australia) **Chaz Mostert**	109
6	(New Zealand) Scott McLaughlin	106
7	(Australia) Garth Tander	102
8	(Australia) Peter Brock	100
9	(Australia) Mark Skaife	88
10	(Australia) **Will Davison**	81

== Championships ==
=== Total championships ===
	Driver	Titles	Seasons
1	(Australia) Jamie Whincup	7	2008, 2009, 2011, 2012, 2013, 2014, 2017
2	(Australia) Ian Geoghegan	5	1964, 1966, 1967, 1968, 1969
2	(Australia) Dick Johnson	5	1981, 1982, 1984, 1988, 1989
2	(Australia) Mark Skaife	5	1992, 1994, 2000, 2001, 2002
5	(Australia) Bob Jane	4	1962, 1963, 1971, 1972
5	(Canada) Allan Moffat	4	1973, 1976, 1977, 1983
5	(New Zealand) Jim Richards	4	1985, 1987, 1990, 1991
8	(Australia) Peter Brock	3	1974, 1978, 1980
8	(Australia) Craig Lowndes	3	1996, 1998, 1999
8	(New Zealand) Scott McLaughlin	3	2018, 2019, 2020
8	(New Zealand) Shane van Gisbergen	3	2016, 2021, 2022

== Other driver records ==
=== Races started, other ===
Description	Record	Details	Ref.
Longest time between first and last starts	32 years, 204 days	(Australia) Peter Brock (1972 Calder Park – 2004 Bathurst 1000)	

=== Race wins, other ===
Description	Record	Details	Ref.
Youngest driver to win a race	19 years, 307 days	(New Zealand) Scott McLaughlin (2013 Auckland 400 Race 1)	
Oldest driver to win a race	55 years, 41 days	(New Zealand) Jim Richards (2002 Bathurst 1000)	
Longest time between consecutive wins	12 years, 88 days	(Australia) Paul Morris (2001 Calder Park Race 3 – 2014 Bathurst 1000)	
Most race starts without a win	229	(Australia) Macauley Jones	

=== Pole positions, other ===
Description	Record	Details	Ref.
Youngest driver to take pole position	20 years, 163 days	(Australia) Broc Feeney (2023 Melbourne SuperSprint Race 1)	
Most pole positions in a season	19	(Australia) Broc Feeney (2025)	

=== Podiums, other ===
Description	Record	Details	Ref.
Most consecutive rounds with a podium	18	(New Zealand) Shane van Gisbergen (2020 Sydney SuperSprint – 2021 Sydney SuperNight 4)	
Most podiums by the same duo	70	(Australia) Craig Lowndes and (Australia) Jamie Whincup	
Most podiums by the same trio	17	(Australia) Craig Lowndes, (Australia) Jamie Whincup and (Australia) Mark Winterbottom	
Youngest driver to score a podium finish	19 years, 160 days	(Australia) **Broc Feeney** (2022 Tasmania SuperSprint Race 2)	
Youngest average age of podium	21 years, 290 days	(Australia) **Broc Feeney**, (Australia) **Kai Allen** and (New Zealand) **Matt Payne** (2025 Darwin Triple Crown Race 3)	

=== Championships, other ===
Description	Record	Details	Ref.
Youngest champion (at the moment they clinched the title)	21 years, 345 days	(Australia) Craig Lowndes (1996)	

=== Teammates, other ===
Description	Record	Details	Ref.
Most rounds as teammates	195	(Australia) Craig Lowndes and (Australia) Jamie Whincup (Triple Eight Race Engineering, 2006–2025)	

== See also ==
- List of Australian Touring Car and V8 Supercar champions
- List of Australian Touring Car Championship races
