= Adelaide 500 =

Supercars Championship event in Australia

Coordinates: 34°55′50″S 138°37′14″E

(South Australia) Adelaide 500
- Race Information
Venue	Adelaide Street Circuit
Number of times held	25
First held	1999
- Race Format
- Race 1
Laps	32
Distance	100 km
- Race 2
Laps	78
Distance	250 km
- Race 3
Laps	78
Distance	250 km
- Last Event (2025)
- Overall Winner
(Australia) Chaz Mostert	Walkinshaw Andretti United
- Race Winners
(Australia) Brodie Kostecki	Dick Johnson Racing
(Australia) Broc Feeney	Triple Eight Race Engineering
(Australia) Matthew Payne	Grove Racing

The Adelaide 500, officially the BP Adelaide Grand Final, is an annual motor racing event for Supercars held on the streets of the east end of Adelaide, South Australia between 1999 and 2020 and again from 2022. The event uses a shortened form of the Adelaide Street Circuit, the former Australian Grand Prix track. The event is still colloquially known as the Clipsal 500 or simply "Clipsal" after its former longtime sponsor. With attendance at around 250,000 in 2023, the Adelaide 500 is the most attended Supercars Championship race.

The event previously took place in February and March, contributing to what locals term "mad March", along with the Adelaide Festival, Adelaide Fringe, WOMADelaide and Adelaide Writers' Week, but after a hiatus in 2021, it returned in 2022 as the season finale in late November or early December.

== Background ==
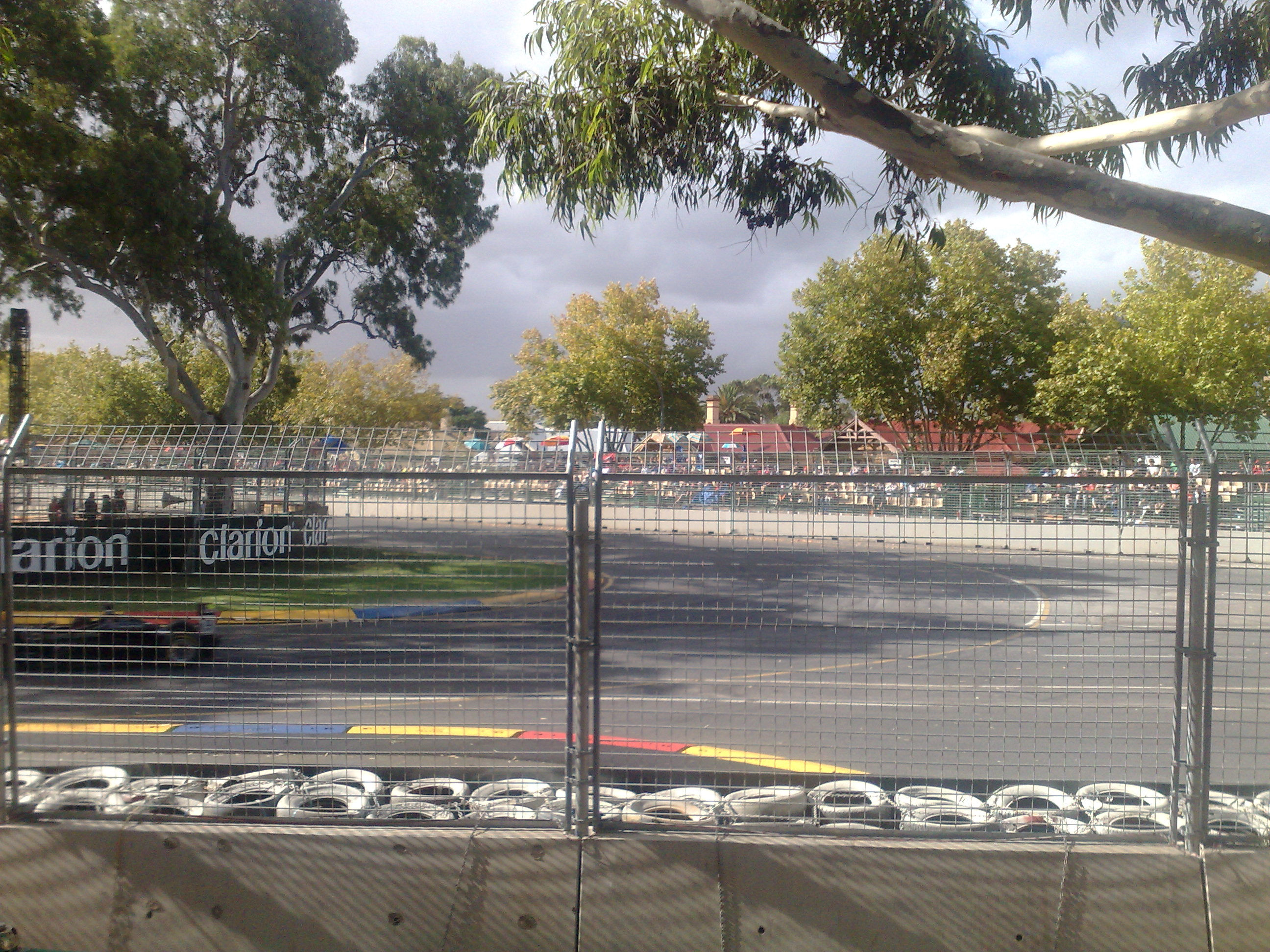
Turn 9

The Adelaide Street Circuit was used for the Formula One Australian Grand Prix from 1985 to 1995. Supercars, then known as Group A (1985 to 1992) and Group 3A Touring Cars (1993 to 1995), had competed in support races at each of these Grands Prix although these races did not count towards the annual Australian Touring Car Championship (ATCC). The state of South Australia had also previously hosted championship rounds of the ATCC at Mallala Motor Sport Park in 1963 and between 1969 and 1998 and at Adelaide International Raceway from 1972 to 1988.

On 1 September 1998, the Government of South Australia announced the conclusion of successful negotiations with the Australian Vee Eight Supercar Company (AVESCO) for the staging of a Supercars race to be known as the Sensational Adelaide 500 on a shortened version of the Grand Prix track. The race effectively replaced the Mallala round on the calendar. The initial contract was for a period of five years with an option for a further five years. After the conclusion of the 1999 race, Clipsal were announced as the event's major sponsor and it became known as the Clipsal 500 Adelaide, a deal which continued until 2017. After the 2018 race was held with no major naming rights sponsor, it was announced that broadband provider Superloop would take over as title sponsor for the next three years. The event had an agreement to appear on the calendar until 2021.

== History ==
The event originally usually took place in February and March, contributing to what locals term "mad March", along with the Adelaide Festival, Adelaide Fringe, WOMADelaide and Adelaide Writers' Week. In October 2020, it was announced the South Australian Tourism Commission would withdraw support for the event, putting the event on hiatus. It returned from the 2022 season as the season finale in late November or early December.

=== 1999 ===
The 1999 event saw Craig Lowndes win the Saturday race, only to be disqualified due to his involvement in an accident with Danny Osborne, and made to start from the back of the grid for race two on the Sunday. Lowndes passed every car in the field to also win race two and thus become the first winner of the Adelaide 500, in what remains his only event victory. Lowndes' disqualification from race one was later overturned. The 1999 race was also controversial, as the original regulations stated the race was one 500 kilometre race with an overnight break at the 250 km mark. When a significant portion of high-profile cars retired in the first leg, the regulations were changed overnight to allow those cars to start the Sunday race. The inaugural event also proved a challenge to the fitness of the drivers, with both Paul Radisich and John Faulkner requiring medical assistance due to dehydration.

=== 2000s ===
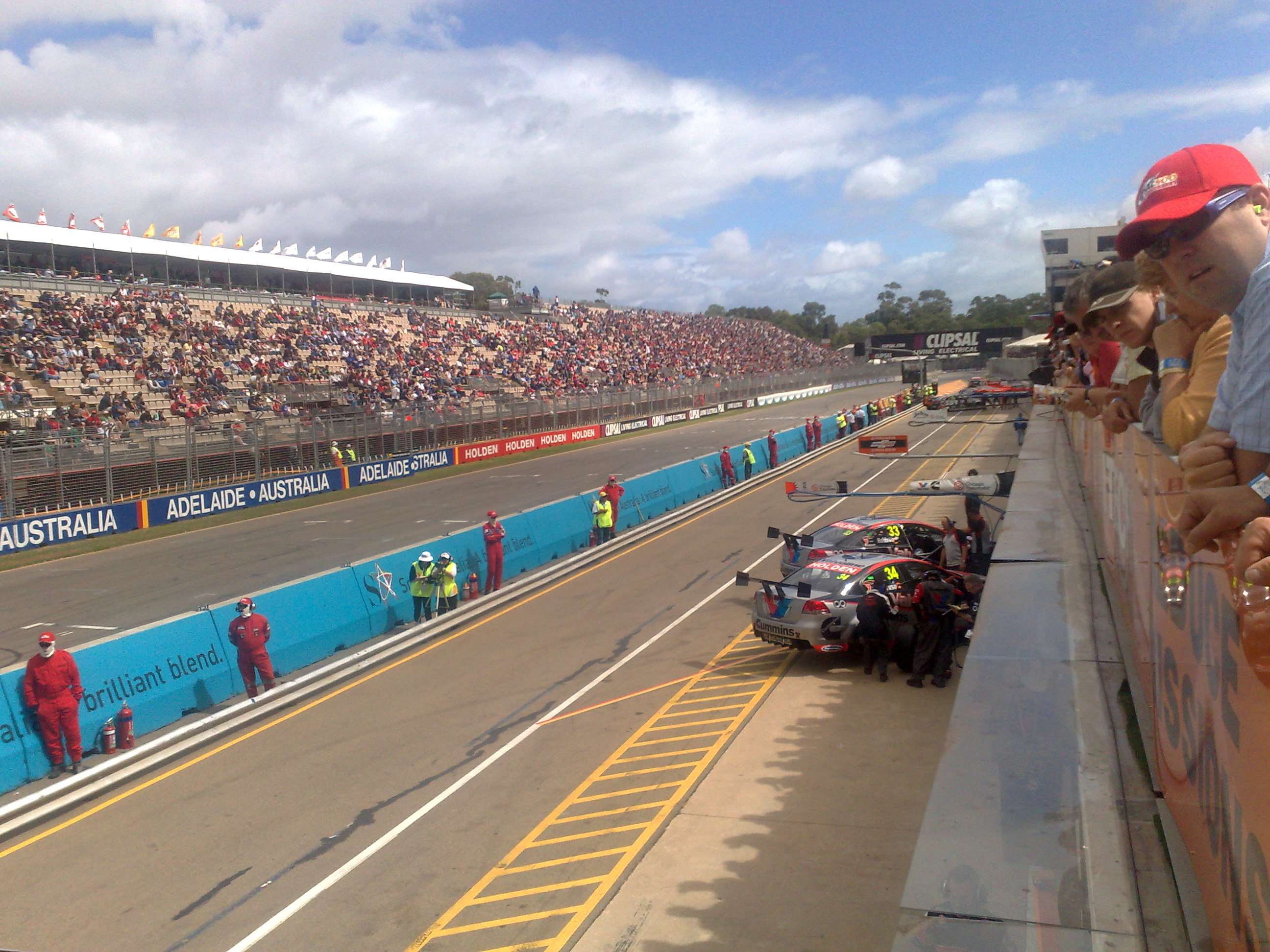
Pit straight during qualifying on Friday 2008

The 2000 event once again saw a last-to-first drive, with Mark Skaife winning the Sunday race after starting 38th due to a DNF on Saturday. Despite this, the event win was awarded to Garth Tander, the only occasion in which the Sunday winner was not awarded the event win. In 2001 Clipsal 500, Craig Lowndes won his first race for Ford since his defection from the Holden Racing Team to a Gibson Motorsport Ford. After winning the Saturday race, he was again in contention on Sunday until an incident with his former teammate Skaife ended his charge. In 2002, the track layout received its only modification to date, with Turn 8 being re-profiled to what became known as 'The Sweeper'. The change followed Brad Jones's roll-over at the previous version of the corner in 2000 among other incidents. The re-profiled corner became one of the most infamous corners in Australian motorsport with several high-profile victims in the first year including Radisich and Glenn Seton. 2002 also saw a pre-qualifying session held, in the week leading into the event, at Mallala Motor Sport Park due to capacity and scheduling constraints at the Adelaide 500 event.

Holden had dominated the event from 1999 to 2003, with three wins to Skaife and one each to Bright and Tander following Lowndes' inaugural event victory. It wasn't until 2004 that a Ford driver won the event, with Marcos Ambrose winning both races, repeating the feat in 2005. Ford's turn of fate was signified by a sweep of the top four in the Saturday race of the 2005 event. Jamie Whincup then made it three in a row for Ford in 2006 with his first event win in Supercars in his first appearance for Triple Eight Race Engineering. The 2007 event brought about the first instance of the driver who scored the most weekend points not winning the event. Brothers Todd Kelly and Rick Kelly won one race each across the weekend however Rick was credited with the event win for his Sunday race victory despite scoring less points in the other race. Whincup went on to win again in 2008, 2009 and 2011 to be the most successful driver in the event's history to date. The 2008 event was, however, marred by the death of Ashley Cooper following a crash in the second-tier Fujitsu V8 Supercars Series race.

=== 2010s ===
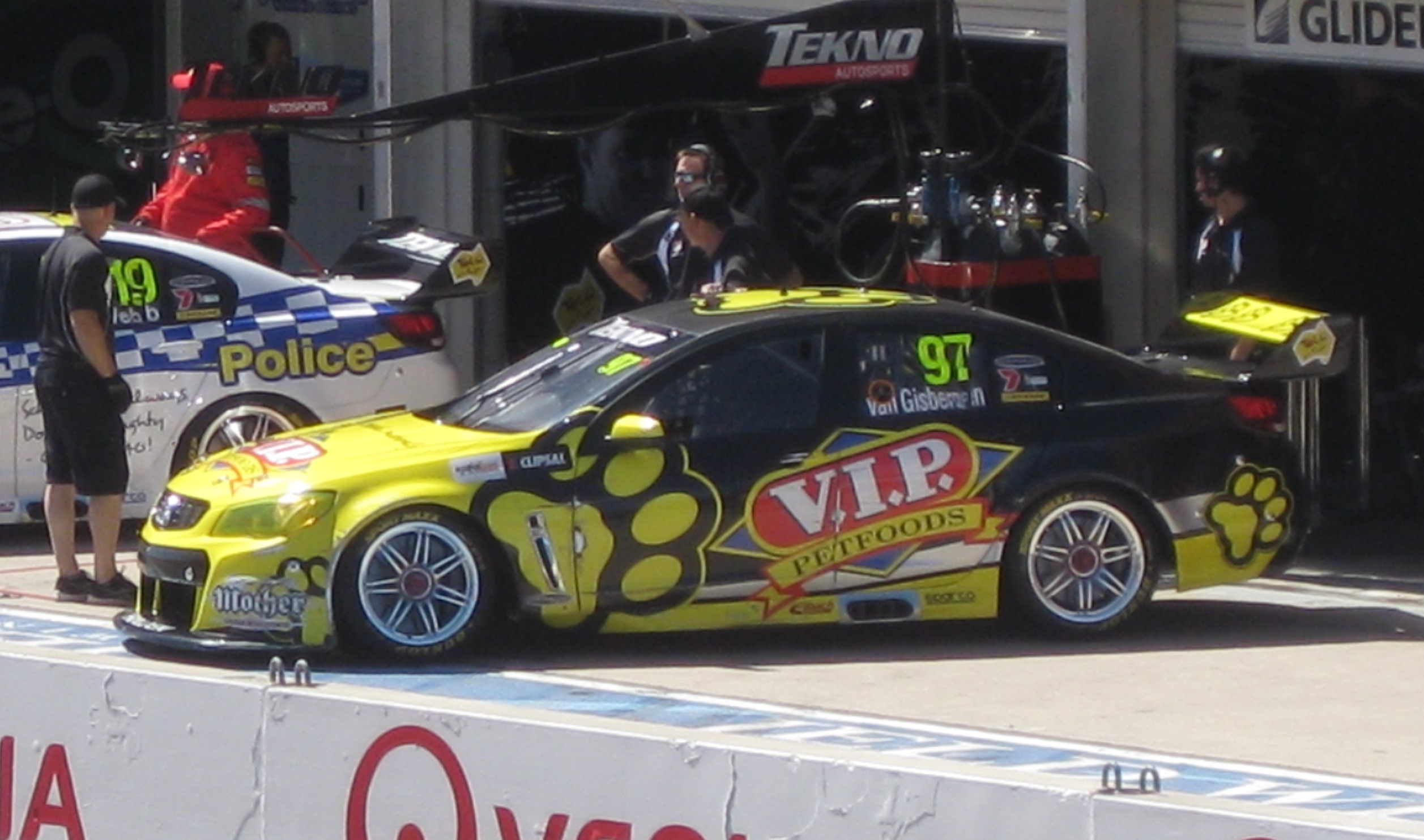
The Holden VF Commodore of Shane van Gisbergen at the 2013 Clipsal 500 Adelaide

From 2002 to 2009, the Adelaide 500 was the opening round of the championship. It lost this position in 2010 and 2011, with the Yas V8 400 in the United Arab Emirates opening the series. From 2012, Adelaide returned to being the opening round. The 2012 Clipsal 500 provided one of the event's most memorable finishes when Whincup chased down and overtook Will Davison on the final lap of the Saturday race. Whincup had made an additional pitstop and gained enough ground to take advantage when Davison's car began to run out of fuel. Davison went on to win the event with a win on Sunday, his first since joining Ford Performance Racing. The 2013 event was the first of the Car of the Future regulations, which saw Nissan and Mercedes-Benz join the series as the first manufacturers outside Ford and Holden since 1993. The Sunday race was won by Shane van Gisbergen in the aftermath of his controversial decision to announce his retirement during the 2012 season before switching teams to Tekno Autosports over the off-season.

In 2014, Volvo rejoined the series and made an immediate impact with Scott McLaughlin fighting off Whincup on the final lap to finish second in the newly introduced second 125 km race on Saturday. On the Sunday, Jason Bright rolled his Brad Jones Racing car at the Senna Chicane, thirteen years after team boss Brad Jones rolled his car at Turn 8. James Courtney won the event and in 2015 became the fourth driver to win the Clipsal 500 back-to-back, after Skaife, Ambrose and Whincup. In doing so he also provided the Holden Racing Team with a record sixth and seventh event wins, two ahead of Triple Eight, who scored their fifth victory in 2017 with van Gisbergen. The intervening event in 2016 was disrupted by thunderstorms and heavy rain on the Sunday with Nick Percat eventually taking his first solo win and the only for Lucas Dumbrell Motorsport amidst a delayed start, confusion surrounding the fuel drop regulations and a red flag.

Van Gisbergen swept the 2017 and 2018 editions of the event, taking four poles and four race victories in a return to the two by 250 km format. The 2018 victory, in the twentieth running of the event, was the first victory for the Holden ZB Commodore in its debut appearance. 2018 also saw the state of South Australia hosting two championship rounds for the first time since 1977 with The Bend Motorsport Park in Tailem Bend joining the calendar. In the return of the Ford Mustang nameplate to the championship in 2019, Scott McLaughlin achieved the same feat as van Gisbergen, winning the first championship race and round for the new car on debut. It was also the first race and round win for the Mustang nameplate since Allan Moffat at Oran Park in 1972, while McLaughlin's team's co-owner Dick Johnson had also won a non-championship race at the Adelaide Street Circuit in a Ford Mustang GT in 1985.

=== 2020s ===
In the week leading into the 2020 Adelaide 500, General Motors announced that the Holden brand, which was founded in Adelaide and has competed in every edition of the championship since its inception, would be retired by the end of the year. The factory Holden team, run by Triple Eight Race Engineering, won the first race of the weekend with winner Jamie Whincup dedicating the win to Holden. Whincup's team-mate van Gisbergen was leading the Sunday race until he was forced to make an additional pitstop for fuel due to a team error and then later suffered a mechanical failure and did not finish. This granted 2019 winner McLaughlin with a back to back event win.

==== Hiatus (2020–2021) ====
In October 2020, the event was cancelled, with the South Australian Tourism Commission announcing that the contract would be terminated one-year early and no renewal will be sought. The COVID-19 pandemic, increased costs and declining public interest due to the discontinuation of Australian-manufactured Ford Falcons or Holden Commodores in the competition were cited by Premier of South Australia Steven Marshall as reasons for the event's demise. The Supercars category released a statement shortly after the announcement stating its regret at the decision and willingness to return to Adelaide should the government decide to hold the event again.

==== Return (2022) ====
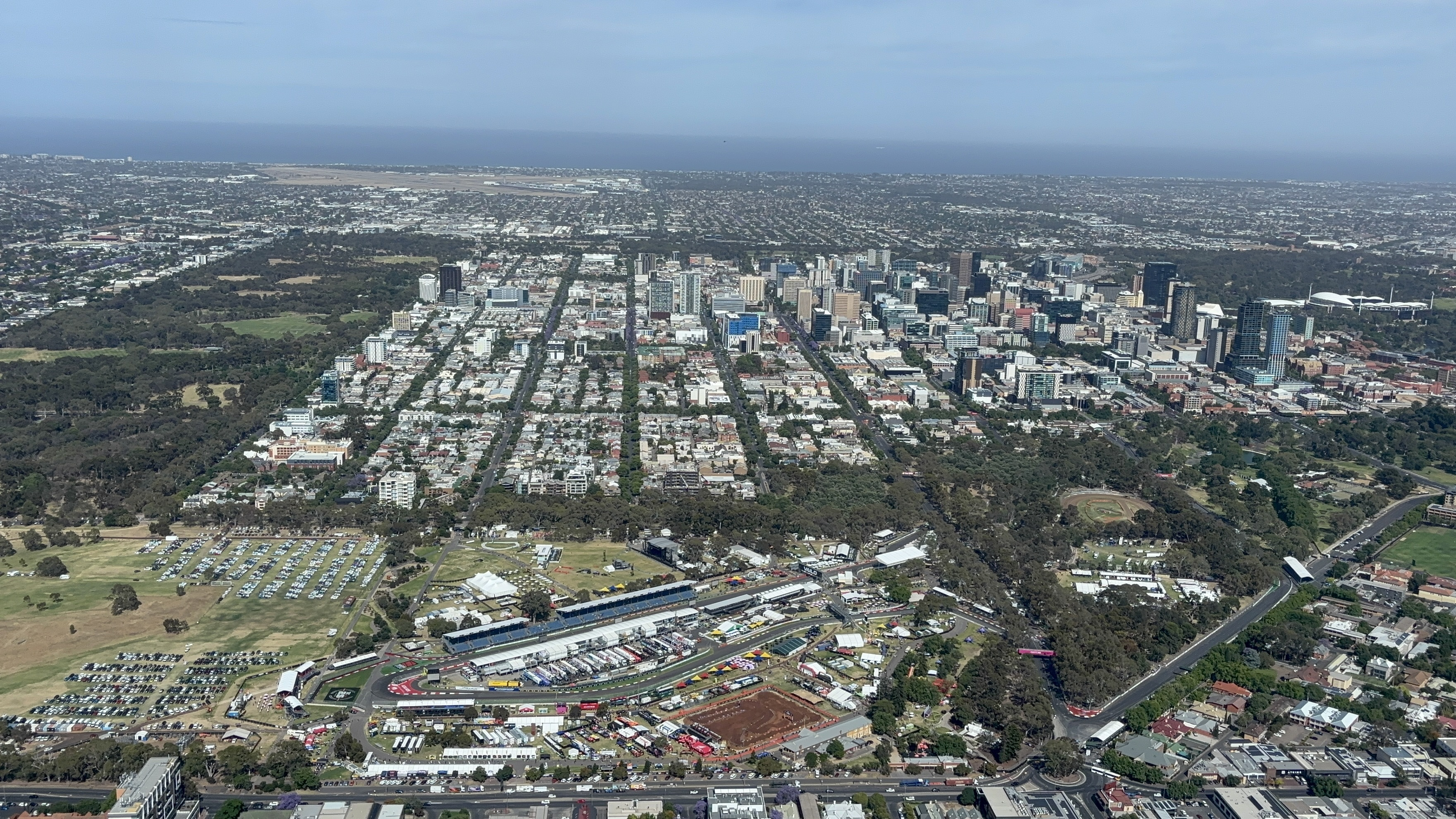
The street circuit as seen from a helicopter in November 2024.

South Australian Opposition Leader Peter Malinauskas launched a campaign via a South Australian Labor Party petition platform to restore the event, and indicated an intent to return the Adelaide 500 should his party win government. Malinauskas committed to reinstate the race in the leadup to the 2022 South Australian state election at which he was elected premier. The Adelaide 500 returned as the final round of the 2022 series, taking place late November or early December. South Australian-based manufacturer of LED lighting and digital displays for sports, then known as VALO, acquired naming rights for three years, as chief commercial sponsor. After changing its name to VAILO in May 2023, the event was branded VAILO Adelaide 500 in 2023.

== Format ==
The event is held over a four-day weekend, from Thursday to Sunday. A thirty-minute practice session is held on Thursday, then another thirty-minute practice session is held on Friday. Friday features a fifteen-minute qualifying session succeeded by a top ten shootout a day later, with a fifteen-minute practice session is held between them on Saturday. The combined results of which decide the grid for the following 250-kilometre (160 mi) race. Sunday features another fifteen-minute qualifying session succeeded by a top ten shootout, the combined results of which decide the grid for the following 250 km race.

Between 2014 and 2016 the event consisted of two 125 km races on the Saturday and one 250 km race on Sunday. In 2017 the organisers switched back to the original format due to the low popularity of the 125 km races from both fans and drivers.

Although the results of all races counted towards the Supercars Championship, the winner of the final race was normally declared the winner of the event, regardless of the results of the first race. The rest of the four days were filled with practice, qualifying, and support races for a number of other racing categories, which over the history of the event included the Super2 Series, Super5000, SuperUtes Series, Touring Car Masters, Australian GT, and Australian Carrera Cup amongst others.

== Concerts ==
The event also includes evening concerts featuring big international and local names. Past performers have included Kiss, Mötley Crüe, Santana, The Doobie Brothers, Rob Thomas, Hilltop Hoods, Keith Urban, and Robbie Williams.

Now known as the After Race Concert series, the November 2024 event featured headline acts Cold Chisel, The Cruel Sea, The Superjesus, Crowded House, Ocean Alley, and Meg Mac, along with local South Australian acts including hip hop artist J-MILLA and electronic/indie/pop group TONIX.

== Recognition ==
The Adelaide 500 was recognised on several occasions as the winner of the "Major Festivals & Events" category at the Australian Tourism Awards in 2003/04, 2005, 2007 and 2008. The event won best event of the series every year from 1999 to 2004. In 2005 it was inducted into the Supercars Hall of Fame and it has also been inducted into the SA Tourism Hall of Fame.

In 2011 the Clipsal 500 was named Best Event of the Year (of 14) at the V8 Supercars annual awards, after an hiatus, for the 8th time. (After being put into the sport's Hall of Fame in 2005, it was ineligible for the best event award for some years). It was also South Australia's biggest ticketed sports event for the 13th year, and by that year had won four Australian Tourism Awards and seven SA Tourism Awards for best major festival or event.

== Attendance and economic impact ==
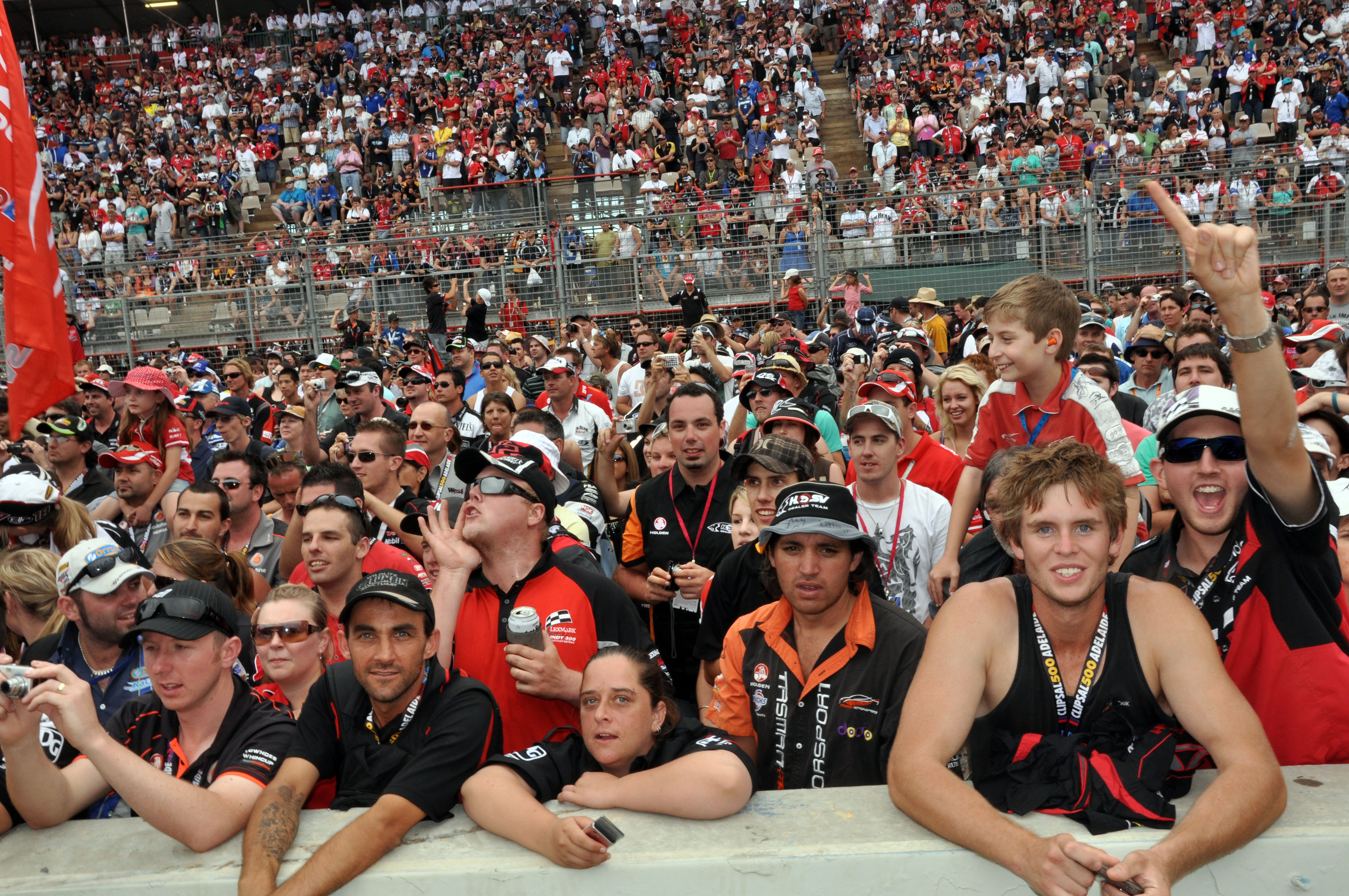
Crowd on the circuit after a race in 2010

In 2008 the Clipsal 500 was attended by 291,400 people, the largest crowd for a domestic motorsport event in Australia, and (as of 2019) the record for attendance at the event.

By 2017, attendance had been dropping at the event (244,350 in 2017), although television viewing figures remained strong. Robbie Williams played at the 2018 event concert, with attendance reaching 273,500 that year. Attendances in 2017 and 2019 (254,000) were the lowest since 2004 (237,400), and dropped significantly further in 2020 (206,000).

Despite declining local attendance, figures in 2020 showed a record economic impact for South Australia and high rates of interstate visitors continuing to attend.

With over 250,000 in attendance in 2023, the Adelaide 500 became the most attended Supercars race in Australia.

== Event names and sponsors ==
- 1999: Sensational Adelaide 500
- 2000–17: Clipsal 500 Adelaide
- 2018: Adelaide 500
- 2019–20: Superloop Adelaide 500
- 2022: VALO Adelaide 500
- 2023–2024: VAILO Adelaide 500
- 2025: BP Adelaide Grand Final

== Winners ==
Year	Driver	Team	Car	Report
1999	(Australia) Craig Lowndes	Holden Racing Team	Holden VT Commodore	Report
2000	(Australia) Garth Tander^{1}	Garry Rogers Motorsport	Holden VT Commodore	Report
2001	(Australia) Jason Bright	Holden Racing Team	Holden VX Commodore	Report
2002	(Australia) Mark Skaife	Holden Racing Team	Holden VX Commodore	Report
2003	(Australia) Mark Skaife	Holden Racing Team	Holden VY Commodore	Report
2004	(Australia) Marcos Ambrose	Stone Brothers Racing	Ford BA Falcon	Report
2005	(Australia) Marcos Ambrose	Stone Brothers Racing	Ford BA Falcon	Report
2006	(Australia) Jamie Whincup	Triple Eight Race Engineering	Ford BA Falcon	Report
2007	(Australia) Rick Kelly^{2}	HSV Dealer Team	Holden VE Commodore	Report
2008	(Australia) Jamie Whincup	Triple Eight Race Engineering	Ford BF Falcon	Report
2009	(Australia) Jamie Whincup	Triple Eight Race Engineering	Ford FG Falcon	Report
2010	(Australia) Garth Tander	Holden Racing Team	Holden VE Commodore	Report
2011	(Australia) Jamie Whincup	Triple Eight Race Engineering	Holden VE Commodore	Report
2012	(Australia) Will Davison	Ford Performance Racing	Ford FG Falcon	Report
2013	(New Zealand) Shane van Gisbergen^{2}	Tekno Autosports	Holden VF Commodore	Report
2014	(Australia) James Courtney^{2}	Holden Racing Team	Holden VF Commodore	Report
2015	(Australia) James Courtney	Holden Racing Team	Holden VF Commodore	Report
2016	(Australia) Nick Percat^{2}	Lucas Dumbrell Motorsport	Holden VF Commodore	Report
2017	(New Zealand) Shane van Gisbergen	Triple Eight Race Engineering	Holden VF Commodore	Report
2018	(New Zealand) Shane van Gisbergen	Triple Eight Race Engineering	Holden ZB Commodore	Report
2019	(New Zealand) Scott McLaughlin	DJR Team Penske	Ford Mustang GT	Report
2020	(New Zealand) Scott McLaughlin	DJR Team Penske	Ford Mustang GT	Report
2021	not held			
2022	(Australia) Broc Feeney	Triple Eight Race Engineering	Holden ZB Commodore	Report
2023	(New Zealand) Matthew Payne^{2}	Grove Racing	Ford Mustang GT	
2024	(Australia) Will Brown	Triple Eight Race Engineering	Chevrolet Camaro ZL1	
2025	(New Zealand) Matthew Payne^{2}	Grove Racing	Ford Mustang GT	

Notes:

- ^1 The winner of the Sunday race is regarded as the Adelaide 500 winner, regardless of total points scored over the weekend. The 2000 event saw an exception to this rule, when Garth Tander was credited with the win despite Mark Skaife winning the Sunday race.
- ^2 In all but seven events, the Sunday race winner was also the highest points scorer for the weekend (Todd Kelly scored the most points in 2007; Craig Lowndes in 2013 and 2014, Michael Caruso in 2016, Chaz Mostert in 2022 and 2025, and Cameron Waters in 2023.

== Multiple winners ==
=== By driver ===
Wins	Driver	Years
4	(Australia) Jamie Whincup	2006, 2008, 2009, 2011
3	(New Zealand) Shane van Gisbergen	2013, 2017, 2018
2	(Australia) Mark Skaife	2002, 2003
2	(Australia) Marcos Ambrose	2004, 2005
2	(Australia) Garth Tander	2000, 2010
2	(Australia) James Courtney	2014, 2015
2	(New Zealand) Scott McLaughlin	2019, 2020
2	(New Zealand) Matthew Payne	2023, 2025

=== By team ===
Wins	Team
7	Holden Racing Team
7	Triple Eight Race Engineering
2	Stone Brothers Racing
2	DJR Team Penske
2	Grove Racing

=== By manufacturer ===
Wins	Manufacturer
15	Holden
10	Ford
1	Chevrolet

== See also ==
- List of Australian Touring Car Championship races
