= 2018 Toyota 86 Racing Series =

The 2018 Toyota 86 Racing Series was an Australian motor racing competition for Toyota 86 cars. The series began on 20 April at Phillip Island Grand Prix Circuit and concluded on 25 November at Newcastle Street Circuit. It was the third running of the Toyota 86 Racing Series. Defending series winner, Jimmy Vernon elected not to defend his title, choosing to contest the 2018 Porsche GT3 Cup Challenge Australia instead.

The series was won by Tim Brook.

== Teams and drivers ==
The following teams and drivers contested the series:

Entrant	No	Driver	Rounds
Gowans Racing	2	(Australia) Adam Gowans	1
Sieders Racing Team	3	(Australia) David Sieders	1–5
Sieders Racing Team	38	(Australia) Luke van Herwaarde	1–5
Sieders Racing Team	68	(Australia) Gerard Maggs	2–5
Sieders Racing Team	96	(Australia) Jaiden Maggs	1–5
Gibson Racing	5	(Australia) John Gibson	1
Adrenaline Industries	5	(Australia) Richard Peasey	2
Adrenaline Industries	37	(Australia) Richard Peasey	3, 5
Aussie Driver Search	6	(Australia) Jake Klein	1–5
Aussie Driver Search	33	(Australia) Jake Burton	1–5
Aussie Driver Search	67	(Australia) Zak Best	5
Aussie Driver Search	71	(Australia) Craig Thornton	3
Aussie Driver Search	71	(Australia) Kyle Austin	5
Aussie Driver Search	76	(Australia) Ellexandra Best	5
Clintons Toyota	7	(Australia) Cameron Crick	1–5
John Iafolla Racing	8	(Australia) John Iafolla	1–5
AISIN Products	9	(Australia) Luke King	1–5
Brema Group Racing	11	(Australia) Zane Morse	1–5
That English Bloke	15	(Australia) James Wilkins	1–5
Hinde Transport	16	(Australia) Ben Grice	1–5
Toyota Racing Australia	17	(Australia) Steve Owen	2
Toyota Racing Australia	17	(Australia) Glenn Seton	5
Toyota Racing Australia	17	(New Zealand) Chris Pither	3
Toyota Racing Australia	36	(New Zealand) Chris Pither	1
Toyota Racing Australia	36	(Australia) James Davison	5
Toyota Racing Australia	37	(Australia) Leanne Tander	1
Toyota Racing Australia	42	(Australia) Leanne Tander	4
Toyota Racing Australia	86	(Australia) Warren Luff	2
Toyota Racing Australia	86	(Australia) Jason Bright	3
Toyota Racing Australia	86	(Australia) Harry Bates	4
Toyota Racing Australia	86	(New Zealand) Jack Milligan	5
Hashtag Race Academy	18	(Australia) Tomas Gasperak	1
Hashtag Race Academy	18	(Australia) Gabriel Gasperak	3–4
George Gutierrez Motorsport	19	(Australia) George Gutierrez	1–5
SLO-Mango Racing	20	(Australia) Tim Beddoe	1, 4
Tempest Solutions	21	(Australia) Zach Loscialpo	1, 3–5
Samoilenko Racing	23	(Australia) Simon Samoilenko	1, 5
M1 Racing	24	(Australia) Michael Fabri	1
Hi-Tec Oils / CGR Performance	27	(Australia) Dylan Thomas	1–5
Hi-Tec Oils / CGR Performance	77	(New Zealand) Jaden Ransley	1
Hi-Tec Oils / CGR Performance	77	(Australia) Will Cauchi	3
Muller M-Sport	28	(Australia) Tom Muller	1
Melbourne City Toyota	29	(Australia) Jaylyn Robotham	1, 3–4
Team RSG	30	(Australia) Hayden Jackson	1–3, 5
McLaren Real Estate Macarthur	34	(Australia) Tim Brook	1–5
MDR Motorsport	35	(Australia) Haydn Clark	1–3
melbas.com.au	37	(Australia) Aaron Cameron	4
Auto Approve / Wilson Security	48	(Australia) Nic Carroll	1–5
Reynolds Auctions	55	(Australia) Gavin Reynolds	1, 4–5
McDonalds Townsville	55	(Australia) Madison Dunston	2
Luff Motors Yass Toyota	56	(Australia) Kane Baxter-Smith	1–2, 5
Cam Walton Racing	60	(United Kingdom) Cam Walton	1–5
Pulse Racing	74	(Australia) Trent Grubel	1–3, 5
International Motorsport	78	(New Zealand) Michael Scott	3, 5
Surelinc	84	(Australia) Emily Duggan	2–5
Whitty Race Engineering	90	(Australia) Jarrod Whitty	1–5
Autoware	92	(Australia) Mitchell Maddren	1–2
Broc Feeney Racing	93	(Australia) Broc Feeney	1–2, 4
Liam McAdam Motorsport	97	(Australia) Liam McAdam	1–5
Hazard Solutions	99	(Australia) Graham Smith	1–3, 5
Declan Fraser Racing	777	(Australia) Declan Fraser	1–5

== Calendar ==
The calendar for the 2018 series was announced on the 3rd of November, 2017. The series began on 20 April at Phillip Island Grand Prix Circuit and concluded on 25 November at Newcastle Street Circuit.

Rnd		Circuit	Date	Pole position	Fastest lap	Winning driver	Winning team
1	R1	(Victoria (state)) Phillip Island Grand Prix Circuit (Phillip Island, Victoria)	20–22 April	(Australia) Liam McAdam	(Australia) Tim Brook	(Australia) Liam McAdam	Liam McAdam Motorsport
1	R2	(Victoria (state)) Phillip Island Grand Prix Circuit (Phillip Island, Victoria)	20–22 April		(Australia) Tim Brook	(Australia) Liam McAdam	Liam McAdam Motorsport
1	R3	(Victoria (state)) Phillip Island Grand Prix Circuit (Phillip Island, Victoria)	20–22 April		(Australia) Liam McAdam	(Australia) Liam McAdam	Liam McAdam Motorsport
2	R1	Townsville Street Circuit (Townsville, Queensland)	6–8 July	(Australia) Tim Brook	(Australia) Tim Brook	(Australia) Tim Brook	McLaren Real Estate Mcarthur
2	R2	Townsville Street Circuit (Townsville, Queensland)	6–8 July		(Australia) Jake Klein	(Australia) Tim Brook	McLaren Real Estate Mcarthur
2	R3	Townsville Street Circuit (Townsville, Queensland)	6–8 July		(Australia) Luke King	(Australia) Tim Brook	McLaren Real Estate Mcarthur
3	R1	The Bend Motorsport Park (Tailem Bend, South Australia)	24–26 August	(Australia) Liam McAdam	(Australia) Declan Fraser	(Australia) James Wilkins	That English Bloke
3	R2	The Bend Motorsport Park (Tailem Bend, South Australia)	24–26 August		(Australia) Declan Fraser	(Australia) Nic Carroll	Auto Approve / Wilson Security
3	R3	The Bend Motorsport Park (Tailem Bend, South Australia)	24–26 August		(Australia) Broc Feeney	(Australia) Broc Feeney	Broc Feeney Racing
4	R1	(Victoria (state)) Sandown Raceway (Melbourne, Victoria)	14–16 September	(Australia) Tim Brook	(Australia) David Sieders	(Australia) Tim Brook	McLaren Real Estate Mcarthur
4	R2	(Victoria (state)) Sandown Raceway (Melbourne, Victoria)	14–16 September		(Australia) Tim Brook	(Australia) Broc Feeney	Broc Feeney Racing
4	R3	(Victoria (state)) Sandown Raceway (Melbourne, Victoria)	14–16 September		(Australia) Nic Carroll	(Australia) Jake Klein	Aussie Driver Search
5	R1	Mount Panorama Circuit (Bathurst, New South Wales)	4–7 October	(Australia) Tim Brook	Race cancelled due to first-lap crash		
5	R2	Mount Panorama Circuit (Bathurst, New South Wales)	4–7 October		(United Kingdom) Cam Walton	(Australia) Jake Klein	Aussie Driver Search
5	R3	Mount Panorama Circuit (Bathurst, New South Wales)	4–7 October		(Australia) Tim Brook	(Australia) Tim Brook	McLaren Real Estate Mcarthur
6	R1	Newcastle Street Circuit (Newcastle, New South Wales)	23–25 November				
6	R2	Newcastle Street Circuit (Newcastle, New South Wales)	23–25 November				
6	R3	Newcastle Street Circuit (Newcastle, New South Wales)	23–25 November				

== Series standings ==
The series was won by Tim Brook.
