= Broc Feeney =

Australian racing driver (born 2002)

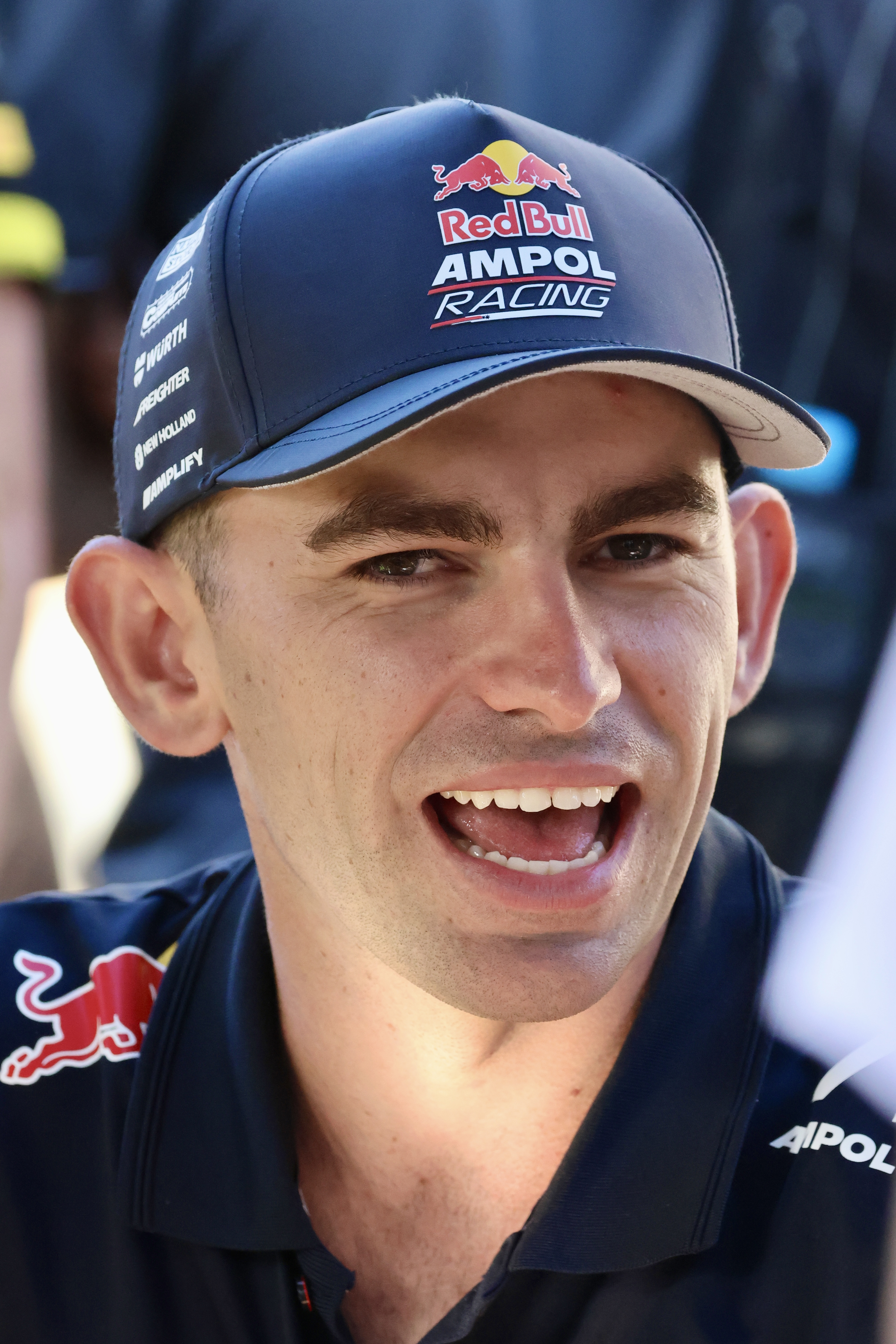
- Feeney at Victoria Square in 2025
- Nationality: (Australia) Australian
- Born: 18 October 2002 (age 24) Gold Coast, Queensland

Supercars Championship career
- Debut season: 2020
- Current team: Triple Eight Race Engineering
- Categorisation: FIA Silver (until 2023); FIA Gold (2024–)
- Car number: 88
- Former teams: Tickford Racing
- Starts: 150
- Wins: 33
- Podiums: 61
- Poles: 31
- Best finish: 2nd in 2024

Previous series
- 2025; 2021–2023, 2025; 2020–2021; 2019; 2018: FR Oceania; GTWC Australia; Super2 Series; Super3 Series; Toyota 86

Championship titles
- 2025; 2025, 2026; 2021; 2019: GTWC Australia; Supercars Sprint Cup; Super2 Series; Super3 Series

Awards
- 2025 2021: Barry Sheene Medal; Motorsport Australia Young Driver of the Year

Broc Feeney (born 18 October 2002) is an Australian racing driver competing in the Supercars Championship for Triple Eight Race Engineering, driving the #88 Ford Mustang S650.

Born and raised in the Gold Coast, Feeney won the Super3 Series as a rookie in 2019 with Paul Morris Motorsport before being promoted to Super2 in 2020 with Tickford Racing. He moved to Triple Eight Race Engineering in 2021, driving the iconic number 888 VF Commodore and won the title—the youngest driver to win either championships. He later inherited Jamie Whincup's No. 88 entry following Whincup's retirement from full-time driving after the 2021 season. After his move to full-time Supercars competition, Feeney has won 24 races and became the inaugural Sprint Cup champion in 2025.

Feeney has also competed in other series, winning the 2025 GT World Challenge Australia's Pro-Am category alongside Brad Schumacher and taking pole-position at third race of the 2025 New Zealand Grand Prix.

== Early and personal life ==
Feeney was born on 18 October 2002 in the Gold Coast, Queensland, Australia. His father Paul used to ride motorcycles before importing and distributing them after his retirement, with Feeney crediting his father with his love for motorsports. He rode motorbikes on dirt tracks from age three before switching over to karting when he was nine. He was mentored by former Supercars driver and Bathurst 1000 winner Paul Morris starting 2018.

Feeney attended All Saints Anglican School throughout his upbringing. He has one older brother and is close friends with former Formula One driver, Jack Doohan.

== Junior racing career ==
=== Karting (2013–2018) ===
Feeney started competitive karting in 2013 at the age of eleven. He won multiple state and national championships in his junior years including five Queensland championships. In 2017, he claimed the Australian KA2 Championship and competed in multiple international events, including the ROK Cup, where he finished fifth in the final standings with a podium.

=== Toyota 86 Racing Series (2018) ===
In 2018, Feeney moved up and competed in the Toyota 86 Racing Series. In his debut year, he became the youngest race winner in the series history, aged fifteen, and scored two race wins and three podium finishes over the season.

=== Super3 Series (2019) ===
Following his Toyota 86 campaign, Feeney was announced to be competing in the Super3 Series with Paul Morris Motorsport for the 2019 season. His first round saw a win from pole position to become the youngest winner in the championship's history. Though only winning one race, Feeney defeated championship rival Jayden Ojeda by 24 points and totalled twelve podiums over fifteen races to become the youngest ever Super3 champion.

=== Super2 Series (2020–2021) ===
After his Super3 victory, Tickford Racing announced in December 2019 that Feeney would be driving for them in the 2020 Super2 Series. After a disappointing season—with no race wins or podiums—he moved move from Tickford Racing to Triple Eight Race Engineering, using the iconic No. 888 car for 2021. That season he won five races, with eight podiums five pole positions and an 177 point gap over second-place, Zak Best. He became the youngest driver to win the Super2 Series, at just 19 years old. With his championship win, he won the Motorsport Australia Young Driver of the Year award.

== Supercars Championship career ==
Following his Super3 campaign, Feeney was given the opportunity to make his practice debut in 2019. He initially drove for Erebus Motorsport in place of Anton De Pasquale at the Winton SuperSprint, going sixth-fastest before doing a test of Dick Johnson Racing's 2020 car at the Queensland Raceway during September 2019.

=== Tickford Racing (2020) ===
Feeney competed in his first Supercars race at the 2020 Bathurst 1000. Turning eighteen on the day of the race, he became one of the youngest drivers to start a Supercars race in the championship's history and partnering James Courtney, the duo came tenth. This also made him the fourth youngest Bathurst 1000 finisher.

=== Triple Eight Race Engineering (2021–present) ===
After his move to Triple Eight Race Engineering's Super2 program at the beginning of 2021, it was announced midway through the year that Jamie Whincup would retire, with Feeney becoming his successor. He was then given a wildcard entry into the 2021 Bathurst 1000, driving alongside Russell Ingall. After qualifying fifteenth, and running ninth, Feeney crashed into a wall on a safety car restart, ending the pair's race on lap 143.

==== 2022: Full-time debut, last Holden race winner ====
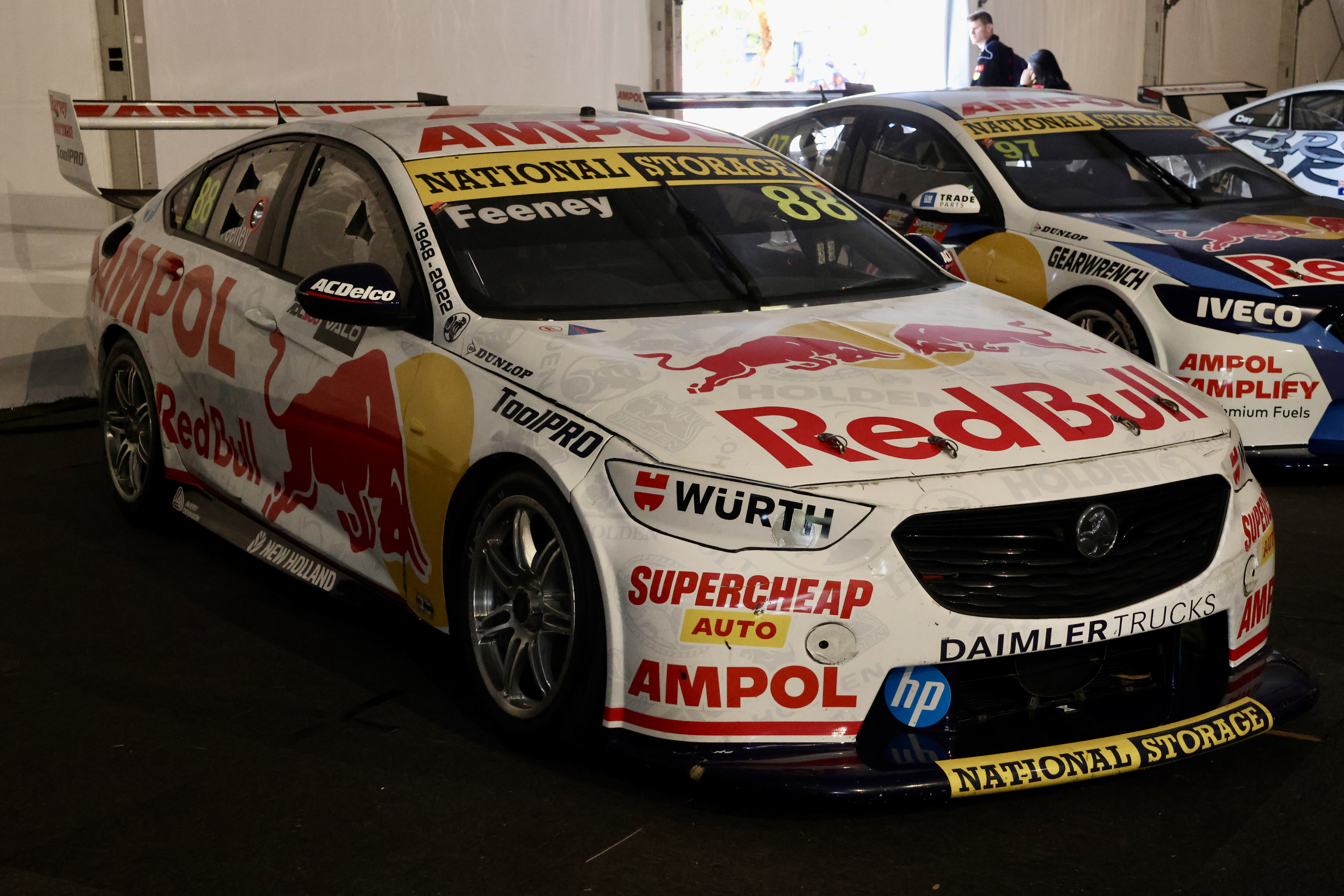
Holden Commodore (ZB) of Feeney on display at the 2025 Adelaide 500

Feeney inherited Whincup's No. 88 car for 2022. In his first full season, Feeney secured points in 23 out of the 24 races with a singular retirement in Race 2 of the 2022 Gold Coast 500. His first podium in the Supercars Championship came in the second race of the 2022 Tasmania SuperSprint finishing in 2nd position behind teammate Shane van Gisbergen. He then secured a third place in the third race of the 2022 Sandown SuperSprint. In Supercars's return to Adelaide for the final race of the season, Feeney held off Chaz Mostert to take the win in Race 2 of the 2022 Adelaide 500. This made him the last driver to win a Supercars Championship race in a Holden following their departure from the sport in 2022.

==== 2023: Sandown 500 win ====
Feeney improved drastically following the introduction of the Gen3 machinery in 2023. Though poor results in the middle of the season took him out of championship contention, he won five races throughout the season. This included two pole to win conversions, at the fourth race at the Melbourne SuperSprint and the third race at the Perth SuperSprint, and a win at Sandown, partnered with Whincup. After running as high as first during the opening laps of the Bathurst 1000, the pair fell out of contention following gearshift issues. He ended the season in third place, behind championship winner Brodie Kostecki and teammate van Gisbergen.

==== 2024: Championship fight vs. Brown ====
After Will Brown moved to Triple Eight to replace van Gisbergen in 2024, with the pair quickly becoming title favourites. Though Feeney won more races than Brown, including a win at the 2024 Bathurst 500, his consistency ultimately cost him the title, as he finished in second place. The season was regarded as one of the most dominant for a team in the championship.

==== 2025: Inaugural Sprint Cup champion ====
2025 saw the Supercars season being split into three, with the Enduro Cup making its return alongside the introduction of the Sprint Cup and the Finals Series. Triple Eight entered the season as championship favourites, as Feeney dominated the first part of the season. This dominance led to him being crowned the inaugural Supercars Sprint Cup champion, clinching the cup in the first race at Ipswich, and included twelve race wins over the eight rounds included in the cup alongside thirteen pole-positions, a five race win-streak, 576 laps led and a 345-point advantage over second place, Matt Payne. Halfway through the season, Triple Eight announced they had re-signed Feeney, alongside teammate Brown, until the end of 2029.

Though falling behind during the Enduro Cup, with a ninth place finish at The Bend and a fifth place finish at Bathurst, Feeney bounced back with two second place finishes and a pole-position at the first round of the Finals Series in the Gold Coast. He then broke Chaz Mostert's three race win-streak at the Sandown 500, earning pole position in the second race to equal Scott McLaughlin's record of 17 pole positions in a season.

Entering the Adelaide Grand Final, Feeney was first in the standings. He won the second race of the event, despite an engine misfire, for his fourteenth race win of the year and took pole position for all three races, breaking McLaughlin's record for 19 poles over the season. During the final race of the season, he was controversially spun by Ryan Wood and fell from second to twentieth. He recovered with alternate tyre strategy before a 15-second pit stop and engine issues had relegated him to the latter half of finishers, being lapped by Mostert with ten laps remaining for a twentieth-place finish. Ultimately, he ended the season third in the standings, behind Mostert and Brown.

== Other racing ==
=== Sportscars racing career ===
In 2020, Feeney replaced Jake Camilleri at MARC Cars Australia for the Bathurst 12 Hour after Camilleri was unable to compete due to business requirements. He went on to finish fifteenth outright with a win in class.

Feeney also competed in the GT World Challenge for multiple years, winning the Australian Pro-Am category in 2025, paired with Brad Schumacher.

In 2025, Feeney competed in the IMSA SportsCar Championship for 75 Express in the GTD Pro class driving a Mercedes AMG GT3 at the Indianapolis round.

=== Open-wheel racing career ===
Feeney made his open-wheeler debut at the fifth round of the 2025 Formula Regional Oceania Championship with mtec Motorsport, substituting for Josh Pierson. He scored pole-position for the third race, before falling down to sixth.

== Career results ==
=== Karting career summary ===
Season	Series	Position
2014	ROK Cup International Final - Mini ROK	20th
2016	SKUSA SuperNationals XX - X30 Junior	33rd
2016	Australian Kart Championship - KA2	**3rd**
2017	Rotax Max Challenge Grand Finals - Junior	32nd
2017	ROK Cup International Final - Mini ROK	5th
2017	Australian Kart Championship - KA2	**1st**
2017	SKUSA SuperNationals XXI - X30 Junior	**2nd**
2018	Australian Kart Championship - KA1	**2nd**

=== Racing career summary ===
Season	Series	Team	Races	Wins	Poles	F/Laps	Podiums	Points	Position
2017–18	Toyota 86 Championship	Neil Allport Motorsport	3	0	0	0	0	103	18th
2018	Toyota 86 Racing Series	Broc Feeney Racing	15	2	0	1	3	878	6th
2018	Aussie Racing Car Series	Broc Feeney Racing	2	0	0	0	0	24	43rd
2018	Queensland Excel Cup	Scotts Rods	4	0	0	1	1	46	21st
2019	Super3 Series	Paul Morris Motorsport	15	1	2	3	12	562	**1st**
2019	Track Attack Excel Cup	Broc Feeney	11	6	1	2	10	240	**3rd**
2019	Australian GT - Trofeo Challenge	MARC Cars Australia	2	0	1	2	2	185	8th
2020	Super2 Series	Tickford Racing	6	0	0	0	0	510	7th
2020	Supercars Championship	Tickford Racing	1	0	0	0	0	156	35th
2021	Super2 Series	Triple Eight Race Engineering	9	5	4	5	8	1254	**1st**
2021	Supercars Championship	Triple Eight Race Engineering	1	0	0	0	0	0	NC
2021	GT World Challenge Australia - Pro-Am	Triple Eight Race Engineering	2	0	1	1	2	30	12th
2022	Supercars Championship	Triple Eight Race Engineering	34	1	0	2	3	2377	6th
2022	GT World Challenge Australia - Pro-Am	Triple Eight Race Engineering	2	2	0	0	2	25	12th
2022	Intercontinental GT Challenge	Triple Eight Race Engineering	1	0	0	0	1	15	15th
2023	Supercars Championship	Triple Eight Race Engineering	28	5	3	3	11	2441	**3rd**
2023	GT World Challenge Australia - Pro-Am	Triple Eight Race Engineering	4	0	1	3	1	46	10th
2023	GT World Challenge Asia - GT3	Triple Eight JMR	8	0	0	0	0	1	41st
2023–24	Asian Le Mans Series - GT	Triple Eight JMR	2	0	0	0	0	14	17th
2024	Supercars Championship	Triple Eight Race Engineering	24	6	5	4	14	2838	**2nd**
2024	GT World Challenge Europe Endurance Cup	AlManar Racing by GetSpeed	1	0	0	0	0	0	NC
2024	Intercontinental GT Challenge	National Storage Racing	1	0	0	0	0	10	19th
2025	Supercars Championship	Triple Eight Race Engineering	33	14	19	8	20	5240	**3rd**
2025	Formula Regional Oceania Championship	mtec Motorsport	3	0	1	0	0	35	19th
2025	GT World Challenge Australia - Pro-Am	Kelso Electrical Team MPC	10	4	1	0	10	211	**1st**
2025	IMSA SportsCar Championship - GTD Pro	75 Express	1	0	0	0	0	220	40th
2026	GT World Challenge Australia - Pro-Am	Kelso Electrical Team MPC	10	3	1	1	4	146	**1st**

=== Super3 Series results ===
(key) (Race results only)

Year	Team	No.	Car	1	2	3	4	5	6	7	8	9	10	11	12	13	14	15	Position	Points
2019	Paul Morris Motorsport	67	Ford FG Falcon	**PHI**; **R1**; 1	**PHI**; **R2**; 7	PHI; R3; 2	WIN; R4; 2	WIN; R5; 7	WIN; R6; 3	QLD; R7; 2	QLD; R8; 4	QLD; R9; 2	BEN; R10; 3	BEN; R11; 2	BEN; R12; 2	**SAN**; **R13**; 3	SAN; R14; 2	SAN; R15; 3	1st	562

=== Super2 Series results ===
(key) (Race results only)

Year	Team	No.	Car	1	2	3	4	5	6	7	8	9	10	Position	Points
2020	Tickford Racing	5	Ford FG X Falcon	ADE; R1; 10	ADE; R2; 7	ADE; R3; 7	SYD; R4; 4	SYD; R5; 8	BAT; R6; 4	BAT; R7; DNS				7th	510
2021	Triple Eight Race Engineering	888	Holden VF Commodore	BAT; R1; 1	BAT; R2; 8	**TOW**; **R3**; 1	**TOW**; **R4**; 1	**TOW2**; **R5**; 1	TOW2; R6; 2	SMP; R7; 2	**SMP**; **R8**; C	**BAT**; **R9**; 1	BAT; R10; 2	1st	1254

=== Supercars Championship results ===
(key) (Races in bold indicate pole position) (Races in italics indicate fastest lap)

Supercars results
Year	Team	No.	Car	1	2	3	4	5	6	7	8	9	10	11	12	13	14	15	16	17	18	19	20	21	22	23	24	25	26	27	28	29	30	31	32	33	34	35	36	37	Position	Points
2020	Tickford Racing	44	Ford Mustang S550	ADE; R1	ADE; R2	MEL; R3	MEL; R4	MEL; R5	MEL; R6	SMP1; R7	SMP1; R8	SMP1; R9	SMP2; R10	SMP2; R11	SMP2; R12	HID1; R13	HID1; R14	HID1; R15	HID2; R16	HID2; R17	HID2; R18	TOW1; R19	TOW1; R20	TOW1; R21	TOW2; R22	TOW2; R23	TOW2; R24	BEN1; R25	BEN1; R26	BEN1; R27	BEN2; R28; PO	BEN2; R29; PO	BEN2; R30; PO	BAT; R31; 10							35th	156
2021	Triple Eight Race Engineering	39	Holden Commodore ZB	BAT1; R1	BAT1; R2	SAN; R3	SAN; R4	SAN; R5	SYM; R6	SYM; R7	SYM; R8	BEN; R9	BEN; R10	BEN; R11	HID; R12	HID; R13	HID; R14	TOW1; R15	TOW1; R16	TOW2; R17	TOW2; R18	TOW2; R19	SMP1; R20	SMP1; R21	SMP1; R22	SMP2; R23	SMP2; R24	SMP2; R25	SMP3; R26	SMP3; R27	SMP3; R28	SMP4; R29	SMP4; R30	BAT2; R31; Ret							NC	0
2022	Triple Eight Race Engineering	88	Holden Commodore ZB	SMP; R1; 9	SMP; R2; 11	SYM; R3; 5	SYM; R4; 2	SYM; R5; 8	MEL; R6; 8	MEL; R7; 14	MEL; R8; 6	MEL; R9; 12	BAR; R10; 5	BAR; R11; 8	BAR; R12; 11	WIN; R13; 10	WIN; R14; 12	WIN; R15; 7	HID; R16; 8	HID; R17; 13	HID; R18; 6	TOW; R19; 7	TOW; R20; 6	BEN; R21; 7	BEN; R22; 6	BEN; R23; 5	SAN; R24; 14	SAN; R25; 10	SAN; R26; 3	PUK; R27; 7	PUK; R28; 8	PUK; R29; 4	BAT; R30; 5	SUR; R31; 14	SUR; R32; Ret	ADE; R33; 8	ADE; R34; 1				6th	2377
2023	Triple Eight Race Engineering	88	Chevrolet Camaro ZL1	NEW; R1; DSQ	NEW; R2; 5	MEL; R3; 4	MEL; R4; 3	MEL; R5; 7	**MEL**; **R6**; **1**	BAR; R7; 10	BAR; R8; 13	**BAR**; **R9**; **1**	SYM; R10; 18	SYM; R11; 1	SYM; R12; 2	HID; R13; 2	**HID**; **R14**; **1**	HID; R15; 3	TOW; R16; 2	TOW; R17; 4	SMP; R18; 11	SMP; R19; 4	BEN; R20; 6	BEN; R21; 9	BEN; R22; 25	SAN; R23; 1	BAT; R24; 23	SUR; R25; 14	SUR; R26; 8	ADE; R27; 5	ADE; R28; 2										3rd	2441
2024	Triple Eight Race Engineering	88	Chevrolet Camaro ZL1	BAT1; R1; 1	**BAT1**; **R2**; **3**	MEL; R3; 1	MEL; R4; 4	MEL; R5; 1	MEL; R6; 3	TAU; R7; 21	TAU; R8; 2	BAR; R9; 5	BAR; R10; 7	HID; R11; 1	**HID**; **R12**; **1**	TOW; R13; 7	TOW; R14; 7	SMP; R15; 9	SMP; R16; 11	**SYM**; **R17**; **3**	SYM; R18; 15	SAN; R19; 2	BAT2; R20; 2	SUR; R21; 3	SUR; R22; 3	ADE; R23; 1	**ADE**; **R24**; **7**														2nd	2838
2025	Triple Eight Race Engineering	88	Chevrolet Camaro ZL1	SMP; R1; 14	SMP; R2; 2	SMP; R3; 5	**MEL**; **R4**; 1	**MEL**; **R5**; 4	**MEL**; **R6**; 2	**MEL**; **R7**; C	TAU; R8; 15	TAU; R9; 5	TAU; R10; 7	SYM; R11; 1	**SYM**; **R12**; 1	SYM; R13; 2	BAR; R14; 4	BAR; R15; 1	**BAR**; **R16**; 1	**HID**; **R17**; 1	**HID**; **R18**; 1	**HID**; **R19**; 1	TOW; R20; 8	TOW; R21; 1	**TOW**; **R22**; **1**	**QLD**; **R23**; **1**	**QLD**; **R24**; **2**	**QLD**; **R25**; **1**	**BEN**; **R26**; **19**	BAT; R27; 6	SUR; R28; 2	**SUR**; **R29**; **2**	SAN; R30; 4	**SAN**; **R31**; **1**	**ADE**; **R32**; **4**	**ADE**; **R33**; **1**	**ADE**; **R34**; **20**				3rd	5240
2026	Triple Eight Race Engineering	88	Ford Mustang S650	SMP; R1; 1	SMP; R2; 6	SMP; R3; 1	MEL; R4; 3	MEL; R5; 7	**MEL**; **R6**; **1**	MEL; R7; Ret	TAU; R8; 4	TAU; R9; 2	CHR; R10; 10	CHR; R11; 5	CHR; R12; 2	CHR; R13; 3	SYM; R14; 4	SYM; R15; 2	**SYM**; **R16**; **1**	HID; R17; 14	HID; R18; 7	HID; R19; 5	TOW; R20; 10	TOW; R21; 8	TOW; R22; 6	BAR; R23; 7	BAR; R24; 1	**BAR**; **R25**; 2	QLD; R26; 4	QLD; R27; 3	QLD; R28; 1	BEN; R28; 23	BAT; R30; 11	**SUR**; **R31**; 9	**SUR**; **R32**; 1	SAN; R33	SAN; R34	ADE; R35	ADE; R36	ADE; R37	2nd*	4120*

=== Complete Bathurst 1000 results ===
Year	Team	Car	Co-driver	Position	Laps
2020	Tickford Racing	Ford Mustang Mk.6	(Australia) James Courtney	10th	161
2021	Triple Eight Race Engineering	Holden Commodore ZB	(Australia) Russell Ingall	DNF	142
2022	Triple Eight Race Engineering	Holden Commodore ZB	(Australia) Jamie Whincup	5th	161
2023	Triple Eight Race Engineering	Chevrolet Camaro Mk.6	(Australia) Jamie Whincup	23rd	142
2024	Triple Eight Race Engineering	Chevrolet Camaro Mk.6	(Australia) Jamie Whincup	**2nd**	161
2025	Triple Eight Race Engineering	Chevrolet Camaro Mk.6	(Australia) Jamie Whincup	6th	161
2026	Triple Eight Race Engineering	Ford Mustang S650	(Australia) Nick Percat	11th	161

=== The Bend 500 Results ===
Year	Team	Car	Co-driver	Position	Laps
2025	Triple Eight Race Engineering	Chevrolet Camaro Mk.6	(Australia) Jamie Whincup	19th	102

=== Bathurst 12 Hour results ===
Year	Team	Co-drivers	Car	Class	Laps	Position	Class pos.
2020	MARC Cars Australia	(Australia) Aaron Cameron (Australia) Nick Percat	Ford Mustang MARC II	I	310	15th	**1st**
2022	(Australia) Triple Eight Race Engineering	(Malaysia) Jefri Ibrahim (New Zealand) Shane van Gisbergen	Mercedes-AMG GT3 Evo	Pro-Am	291	**3rd**	**3rd**
2023	(Australia) Triple Eight Race Engineering	(Germany) Maximilian Götz (New Zealand) Shane van Gisbergen	Mercedes-AMG GT3 Evo	Pro	322	5th	5th
2024	(Australia) Triple Eight Race Engineering	(Australia) Will Brown (Canada) Mikaël Grenier	Mercedes-AMG GT3 Evo	Pro	275	6th	6th
2025	(Australia) Jamec Racing	(Switzerland) Ricardo Feller (Australia) Liam Talbot	Audi R8 LMS Evo II	Pro	164	DNF	DNF

=== GT World Challenge Australia Results ===
(Races in bold indicate pole position) (Races in italics indicate fastest lap)

Year	Team	Car	Class	1	2	3	4	5	6	7	8	9	10	11	12	13	Position	Points
2021	Triple Eight Race Engineering	Mercedes-AMG GT3 Evo	Pro-Am	PHI; R1	PHI; R2	BAT; R3	BAT; R4	BEN; R5; 3	**BEN**; **R6**; **3**	BAT; R7	BAT; R8						12th	30
2022	Triple Eight Race Engineering	Mercedes-AMG GT3 Evo	Pro-Am	PHI; R1	PHI; R2	QLD; R3	QLD; R4	SAN; R5	SAN; R6	**BEN**; **R7**; **1**	**BEN**; **R8**; **C**	ADL; R9	ADL; R10	ADL; R11			-	0
2023	Triple Eight Race Engineering	Mercedes-AMG GT3 Evo	Pro-Am	BAT; R1; 5	**BAT**; **R2**; **2**	WAN; R3	WAN; R4	PHI; R5	PHI; R6	SMP; R7	SMP; R8	QLD; R9; 6	QLD; R10; 5	ADL; R11	ADL; R12	ADL; R13	12th	46
2025	Melbourne Performance Centre	Audi R8 LMS Evo II	Pro-Am	PHI; R1; 9	PHI; R2; 1	SMP; R3; 4	SMP; R4; 3	**QLD**; **R5**; **1**	**QLD**; **R6**; **3**	SAN; R7; 3	SAN; R8; 2	BEN; R9; 3	BEN; R10; 3	**HAM**; **R11**; **1**	**HAM**; **R12**; **1**		1st	211
2026	Melbourne Performance Centre	Audi R8 LMS Evo II	Pro-Am	**PHI**; **R1**; **1**	PHI; R2; 8	BEN; R3; 4	BEN; R4; 2	QLD; R5; 4	QLD; R6; 10	HID; 1; 4	HID; 2; 1	SYD; 1; 5	SYD; 2; 1	ADL; 1	ADL; 2		1st	146

=== Complete Formula Regional Oceania Championship results ===
(key) (Races in bold indicate pole position) (Races in italics indicate fastest lap)

Year	Team	1	2	3	4	5	6	7	8	9	10	11	12	13	14	15	DC	Points
2025	mtec Motorsport	TAU; 1	TAU; 2	TAU; 3	HMP; 1	HMP; 2	HMP; 3	MAN; 1	MAN; 2	MAN; 3	TER; 1	TER; 2	TER; 3	HIG; 1; 10	HIG; 2; 13	**HIG**; **3**; 6	19th	35

==== Complete New Zealand Grand Prix results ====
Year	Team	Car	Qualifying	Main race
2025	(New Zealand) mtec Competition	Tatuus FT-60 - Toyota	**1st**	6th

Sporting positions
Preceded by Tyler Everingham	Winner of the Super3 Series; 2019	Succeeded by Nash Morris
Preceded by Thomas Randle	Winner of the Super2 Series; 2021	Succeeded by Declan Fraser
Preceded by Chaz Mostert; Liam Talbot	Winner of the GT World Challenge Australia; 2025 (with Brad Schumacher)	Succeeded by Incumbent
Awards and achievements
Preceded by Jack Doohan	Jon Targett Perpetual Karting Trophy; 2017	Succeeded by Kai Allen
Preceded by Edan Thornburrow	Motorsport Australia; Young Driver of the Year Award; 2021	Succeeded by Taylor Gill
Preceded by Chaz Mostert	Barry Sheene Medal; 2025	Succeeded by Incumbent
Preceded by Matt Payne	Jason Richards Memorial Trophy; 2026	Succeeded by Incumbent
