= 2023 Sandown 500 =

2023 race event of the Supercars Championship

(Victoria (state)) 2023 Penrite Oil Sandown 500
Event Information
- Round 9 of 12 in the 2023 Supercars Championship
- Date: 15–17 September 2023
- Location: Melbourne, Victoria
- Venue: Sandown Raceway

Results
Race 1
Distance	158 laps	495.839 km
Pole position	(Australia) Will Brown; Erebus Motorsport	1:08.6693
Winner	(Australia) Broc Feeney (Australia) Jamie Whincup; Triple Eight Race Engineering	3:21:16.9982

The 2023 Sandown 500 (commercially titled 2023 Penrite Oil Sandown 500) was a motor racing event for Supercars, held on the weekend of 15 to 17 September 2023. The event was held at Sandown Raceway in Melbourne, Victoria, Australia and consisted of one race, scheduled to be 500 kilometres in length. It was the ninth event of twelve in the 2023 Supercars Championship and hosted Race 23 of the series.

== Results ==
=== Race ===
Pos.	No.	Driver	Team	Car	Laps	Time/Retired	Grid	Points
1	88	(Australia) Broc Feeney (Australia) Jamie Whincup	Triple Eight Race Engineering	Chevrolet Camaro Gen6	158	3:21:16.9982	5	300
2	99	(Australia) Brodie Kostecki (Australia) David Russell	Erebus Motorsport	Chevrolet Camaro Gen6	158	+0.9816	2	276
3	97	(New Zealand) Shane van Gisbergen (New Zealand) Richie Stanaway	Triple Eight Race Engineering	Chevrolet Camaro Gen6	158	+2.2220	19	258
4	9	(Australia) Will Brown (Australia) Jack Perkins	Erebus Motorsport	Chevrolet Camaro Gen6	158	+5.8498	1	240
5	8	(New Zealand) Andre Heimgartner (Australia) Dale Wood	Brad Jones Racing	Chevrolet Camaro Gen6	158	+6.7914	15	222
6	19	(New Zealand) Matthew Payne (France) Kévin Estre	Grove Racing	Ford Mustang S650	158	+6.9582	7	204
7	17	(Australia) Will Davison (Australia) Alex Davison	Dick Johnson Racing	Ford Mustang S650	158	+10.7987	4	192
8	11	(Australia) Anton de Pasquale (Australia) Tony D'Alberto	Dick Johnson Racing	Ford Mustang S650	158	+11.5801	20	180
9	23	(Australia) Tim Slade (Australia) Jonathon Webb	PremiAir Racing	Chevrolet Camaro Gen6	158	+19.8850	11	168
10	888	(Australia) Zane Goddard (Australia) Craig Lowndes	Triple Eight Race Engineering	Chevrolet Camaro Gen6	158	+23.0022	23	156
11	18	(Australia) Mark Winterbottom (Australia) Michael Caruso	Team 18	Chevrolet Camaro Gen6	158	+23.3114	13	144
12	5	(Australia) James Courtney (Australia) Zak Best	Tickford Racing	Ford Mustang S650	158	+33.8931	14	138
13	56	(Australia) Declan Fraser (Australia) Tyler Everingham	Tickford Racing	Ford Mustang S650	158	+41.5202	17	132
14	14	(Australia) Bryce Fullwood (Australia) Dean Fiore	Brad Jones Racing	Chevrolet Camaro Gen6	157	+1 lap	25	126
15	31	(Australia) James Golding (Australia) Dylan O'Keeffe	PremiAir Racing	Chevrolet Camaro Gen6	157	+1 lap	18	120
16	34	(Australia) Jack Le Brocq (Australia) Jayden Ojeda	Matt Stone Racing	Chevrolet Camaro Gen6	157	+1 lap	10	114
17	3	(Australia) Todd Hazelwood (Australia) Tim Blanchard	Blanchard Racing Team	Ford Mustang S650	157	+1 lap	6	108
18	4	(Australia) Jack Smith (New Zealand) Jaxon Evans	Brad Jones Racing	Chevrolet Camaro Gen6	157	+1 lap	22	102
19	96	(Australia) Macauley Jones (Australia) Jordan Boys	Brad Jones Racing	Chevrolet Camaro Gen6	157	+1 lap	24	96
20	6	(Australia) Cam Waters (Australia) James Moffat	Tickford Racing	Ford Mustang S650	157	+1 lap	3	90
21	20	(Australia) Scott Pye (Australia) Warren Luff	Team 18	Chevrolet Camaro Gen6	157	+1 lap	21	84
22	25	(Australia) Chaz Mostert (Australia) Lee Holdsworth	Walkinshaw Andretti United	Ford Mustang S650	157	+1 lap	16	78
23	2	(Australia) Nick Percat (New Zealand) Fabian Coulthard	Walkinshaw Andretti United	Ford Mustang S650	157	+1 lap	26	72
24	7	(Australia) Jake Kostecki (Australia) Aaron Love	Blanchard Racing Team	Ford Mustang S650	156	+2 laps	27	66
25	55	(Australia) Thomas Randle (Australia) Garry Jacobson	Tickford Racing	Ford Mustang S650	145	+13 laps	9	60
DNF	35	(Australia) Cameron Hill (Australia) Jaylyn Robotham	Matt Stone Racing	Chevrolet Camaro Gen6	137	Steering	12	
DNF	26	(Australia) David Reynolds (Australia) Garth Tander	Grove Racing	Ford Mustang S650	18	Wheel	8	
Fastest lap: Garry Jacobson (Tickford Racing) 1:10.1686 on Lap 136
