= 2020 Supercars Championship =

Motor racing competition

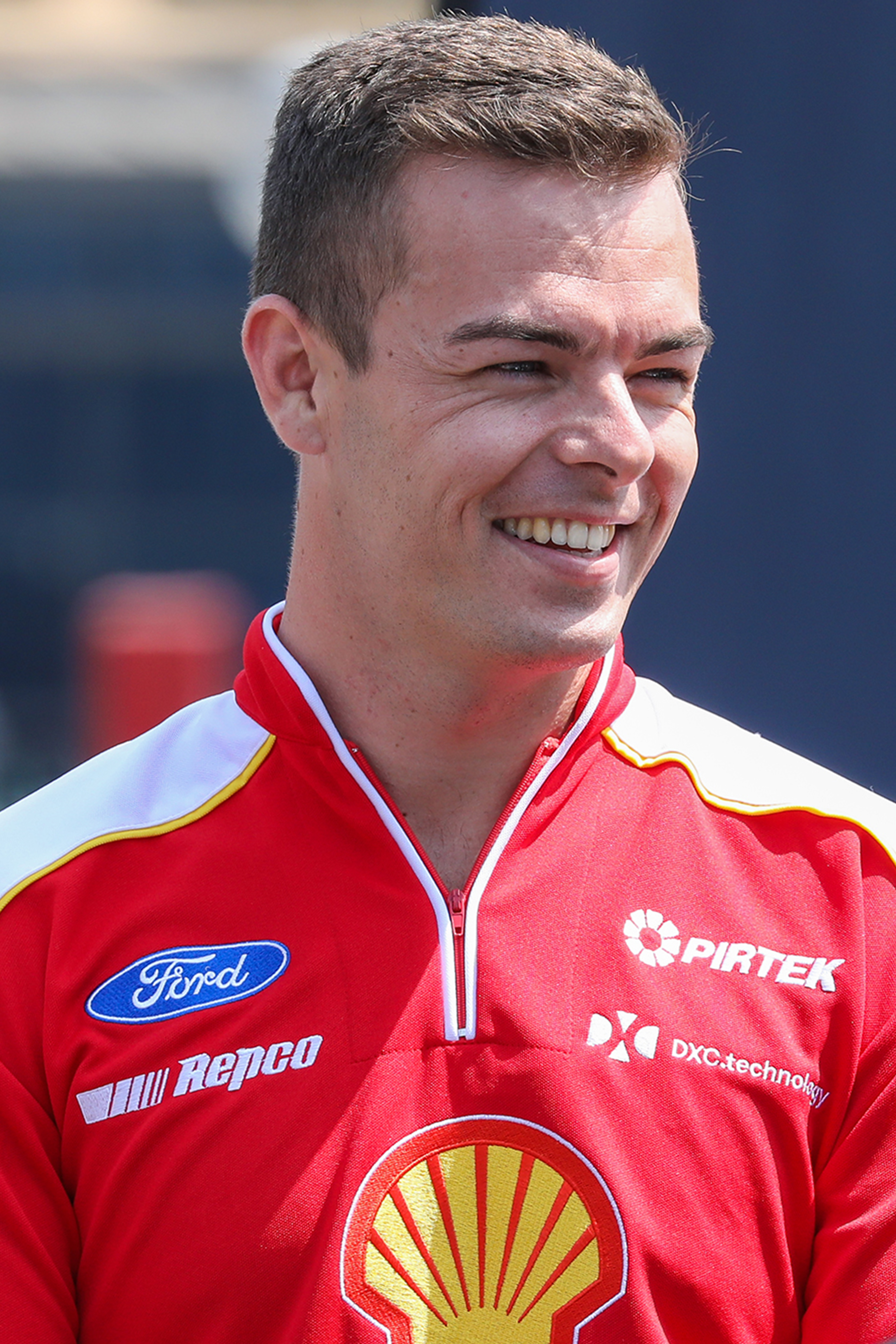
Scott McLaughlin secured the drivers' championship for the third consecutive year.

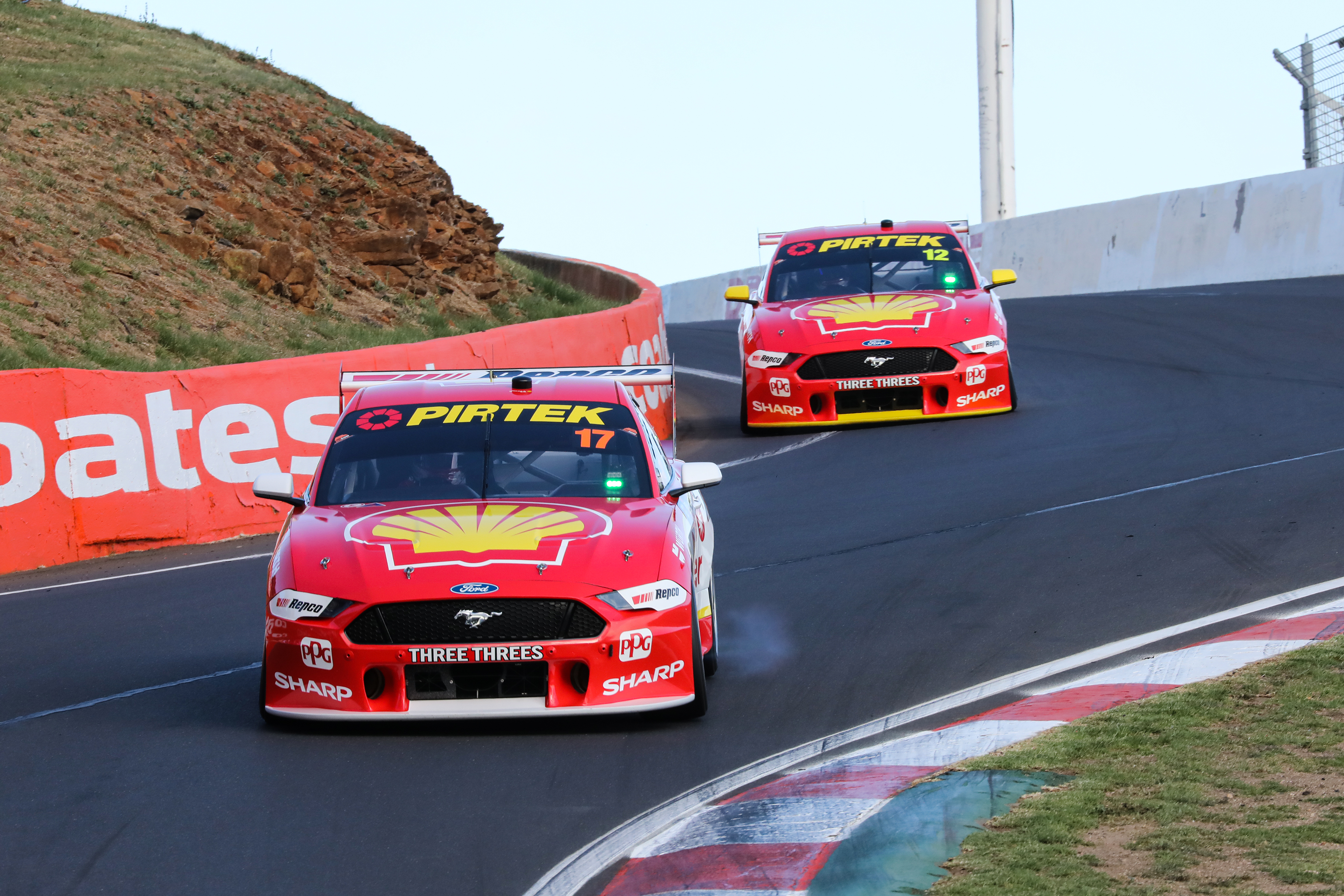
DJR Team Penske (photographed in 2019) successfully defended the teams' championship.

The 2020 Supercars Championship (known for commercial reasons as the 2020 Virgin Australia Supercars Championship) was a motor racing series for Supercars. It was the twenty-second running of the Supercars Championship and the twenty-fourth series in which Supercars have contested the Australian Touring Car Championship, the premier title in Australian motorsport. Due to disruption caused by the COVID-19 pandemic, a number of rounds were rescheduled or cancelled.

The series reverted to having only two manufacturers, Ford and Holden, for the first time since 2012 with Nissan no longer being represented on the grid.

Scott McLaughlin successfully defended his drivers' championship with one event remaining, winning the title for the third consecutive year. DJR Team Penske successfully defended the teams' championship. Ford successfully defended the manufacturers' championship.

== Teams and drivers ==
Holden was represented by factory-backed team Triple Eight Race Engineering.

The following teams and drivers competed in the 2020 championship.

Championship entries						Bathurst 1000 entries
Manufacturer	Model	Team	No.	Driver name	Rounds	Co-driver name
Ford	Mustang GT	Tickford Racing	5	(Australia) Lee Holdsworth	All	(Australia) Michael Caruso
Ford	Mustang GT	Tickford Racing	6	(Australia) Cam Waters	All	(Australia) Will Davison
Ford	Mustang GT	Tickford Racing	44	(Australia) James Courtney	3–11	(Australia) Broc Feeney
Ford	Mustang GT	Tickford Racing	55	(Australia) Jack Le Brocq	All	(Australia) James Moffat
Ford	Mustang GT	Kelly Racing	7	(New Zealand) Andre Heimgartner	All	(Australia) Dylan O'Keeffe
Ford	Mustang GT	Kelly Racing	15	(Australia) Rick Kelly	All	(Australia) Dale Wood
Ford	Mustang GT	DJR Team Penske	12	(New Zealand) Fabian Coulthard	All	(Australia) Tony D'Alberto
Ford	Mustang GT	DJR Team Penske	17	(New Zealand) Scott McLaughlin	All	(Australia) Tim Slade
Ford	Mustang GT	23Red Racing	23	(Australia) Will Davison	1–2	—N/a
Holden	Commodore ZB	Walkinshaw Andretti United	2	(Australia) Bryce Fullwood	All	(Australia) Kurt Kostecki
Holden	Commodore ZB	Walkinshaw Andretti United	25	(Australia) Chaz Mostert	All	(Australia) Warren Luff
Holden	Commodore ZB	Tim Blanchard Racing	3	(Australia) Macauley Jones	All	(Australia) Tim Blanchard
Holden	Commodore ZB	Brad Jones Racing	4	(Australia) Jack Smith	All	(Australia) Jack Perkins
Holden	Commodore ZB	Brad Jones Racing	8	(Australia) Nick Percat	All	(Australia) Thomas Randle
Holden	Commodore ZB	Brad Jones Racing	14	(Australia) Todd Hazelwood	All	(Australia) Jordan Boys
Holden	Commodore ZB	Erebus Motorsport	9	(Australia) David Reynolds	All	(Australia) Will Brown
Holden	Commodore ZB	Erebus Motorsport	99	(Australia) Anton de Pasquale	All	(Australia) Brodie Kostecki
Holden	Commodore ZB	Team 18	18	(Australia) Mark Winterbottom	All	(Australia) James Golding
Holden	Commodore ZB	Team 18	20	(Australia) Scott Pye	All	(Australia) Dean Fiore
Holden	Commodore ZB	Team Sydney by Tekno	19	(Australia) James Courtney	1	—N/a
Holden	Commodore ZB	Team Sydney by Tekno	19	(Australia) Alex Davison	2–11	(Australia) Jonathon Webb
Holden	Commodore ZB	Team Sydney by Tekno	22	(New Zealand) Chris Pither	All	(Australia) Steve Owen
Holden	Commodore ZB	Matt Stone Racing	34	(Australia) Zane Goddard	1, 4, 6–7, 9, 11	—N/a (Note: Under the SuperLites regulations, Goddard and Kostecki were permitted to partner each other for the Bathurst 1000.)
Holden	Commodore ZB	Matt Stone Racing	34	(Australia) Jake Kostecki	2–3, 5, 8, 10–11	—N/a
Holden	Commodore ZB	Matt Stone Racing	35	(Australia) Garry Jacobson	All	(Australia) David Russell
Holden	Commodore ZB	Triple Eight Race Engineering	88	(Australia) Jamie Whincup	All	(Australia) Craig Lowndes
Holden	Commodore ZB	Triple Eight Race Engineering	97	(New Zealand) Shane van Gisbergen	All	(Australia) Garth Tander
Wildcard entries
Holden	Commodore ZB	Garry Rogers Motorsport	40	—N/a	11	(Australia) Tyler Everingham (Australia) Jayden Ojeda

=== Team changes ===
Tekno Autosports relocated to Western Sydney and expanded to a two-car operation under the Team Sydney by Tekno brand. A second Racing Entitlement Contract (REC) was acquired from Supercars management. It entered two Triple Eight-built Holden ZB Commodores.

Brad Jones Racing expanded to a three-car team, after acquiring an REC that was formerly owned by Britek Motorsport and had been leased to Matt Stone Racing. Brad Jones Racing continued to operate a fourth car on behalf of Tim Blanchard Racing.

Kelly Racing scaled down from a four-car team racing Nissan Altimas to a two-car team with Ford Mustangs. Two of the team's RECs were purchased by Team 18 and Matt Stone Racing, with both expanding to two car entries. Matt Stone Racing acquired a second REC from Garry Rogers Motorsport to replace the one it had been leasing from Britek Motorsport. (Note: Under the series' sporting regulations, an REC may be leased from its owner for two years, after which it must be purchased or returned to its owner. The REC used by Matt Stone Racing in 2018 and 2019 was leased from Britek Motorsport and returned for the 2020 championship.) Team principal Garry Rogers cited escalating costs of competing and a model that required them to purchase parts rather than develop them as the reasons for his decision to withdraw. Rogers' team later returned to the championship with a single wildcard for the Bathurst 1000 – signing Super2 Series drivers Tyler Everingham and Jayden Ojeda. Nathan Herne from the Australian TA2 Racing Series was originally signed in Ojeda's place however his entry was blocked as Motorsport Australia denied him of the required licence.

=== Driver changes ===
Walkinshaw Andretti United fielded a new line-up in 2020 after James Courtney and Scott Pye left the team. Courtney moved to Team Sydney by Tekno, with his seat at Walkinshaw Andretti United filled by Chaz Mostert. Jack Le Brocq left Tekno Autosports and joined Tickford Racing, where he replaced Mostert. Scott Pye joined Team 18 and Walkinshaw Andretti United named reigning Super2 champion Bryce Fullwood as Pye's replacement. Chris Pither returned to the championship on a full-time basis, racing with Team Sydney by Tekno. Pither last competed full-time in 2016. Courtney departed the team after one round.

Zane Goddard and Jake Kostecki graduated from the Super2 Series and make their championship débuts driving for Matt Stone Racing. Goddard and Kostecki will share a car as part of the new SuperLite program, allowing both drivers to compete in five rounds of the series each before teaming up for the Enduro Cup.

Todd Hazelwood left Matt Stone Racing to join Brad Jones Racing. He replaced Tim Slade who joined DJR Team Penske as a co-driver. Jack Smith made his full-time début in the championship with the team. Smith had previously competed for Brad Jones Racing in the Super2 Series and at selected Supercars rounds as a wildcard in 2019.

Richie Stanaway and James Golding left Garry Rogers Motorsport after the team withdrew from the series. Stanaway retired from motorsport, while Golding joined Team 18 for the endurance races.

Simona de Silvestro and Garry Jacobson left Kelly Racing after it scaled down to two cars. De Silvestro returned to Europe to compete in the ADAC GT Masters with Porsche, while Jacobson joined Matt Stone Racing.

=== Mid-season changes ===
James Courtney left Team Sydney by Tekno after round one, citing an inability to come to an agreement with the team for the contract to continue. He was replaced by Alex Davison. 23Red Racing withdrew from the series after its primary sponsor withdrew after round 2, leaving Will Davison without a drive. He became a co-driver at the Bathurst 1000 for Tickford Racing after Alexandre Prémat, who resided in Las Vegas, was forced out by COVID-19 travel restrictions. Tickford Racing then leased the REC and entered the car as a fourth entry with James Courtney from round three onwards.

=== Wildcard entries ===
Only a single wildcard would be entered by Garry Rogers Motorsport in the Bathurst 1000. Originally Tyler Everingham and Nathan Herne were announced as the drivers. However a dispensation for Herne to compete without a valid Superlicense was denied by Motorsport Australia and he was replaced by Jayden Ojeda.

== Calendar ==
The 2020 championship was originally due to be contested over twenty-eight races run at fourteen rounds. Due to the COVID-19 pandemic, the Melbourne 400 event was cancelled after practice and qualifying had commenced. With multiple calendar revision during the year, the championship was contested over eleven rounds, although racing only occurred at ten rounds.

Round	Event	Circuit	Location	Dates	Map
1	Adelaide 500	(South Australia) Adelaide Street Circuit	Adelaide, South Australia	22–23 February	2020 Supercars Championship is located in Australia
2	Melbourne 400	(Victoria (state)) Albert Park Circuit	Albert Park, Victoria	13–15 March (Note: The Melbourne 400 was intended to be run in support of the 2020 Australian Grand Prix. Qualifying for two races had been completed Thursday when a Formula One mechanic tested positive for COVID-19. The Grand Prix was cancelled and officials ended the Supercars meeting.)	2020 Supercars Championship is located in Australia
3	Sydney SuperSprint	(New South Wales) Sydney Motorsport Park	Eastern Creek, New South Wales	27–28 June	2020 Supercars Championship is located in Australia
4	Sydney SuperSprint	(New South Wales) Sydney Motorsport Park	Eastern Creek, New South Wales	18–19 July	2020 Supercars Championship is located in Australia
5	Darwin Triple Crown	(Northern Territory) Hidden Valley Raceway	Darwin, Northern Territory	15–16 August	2020 Supercars Championship is located in Australia
6	Darwin SuperSprint	(Northern Territory) Hidden Valley Raceway	Darwin, Northern Territory	22–23 August	2020 Supercars Championship is located in Australia
7	Townsville SuperSprint	(Queensland) Reid Park Street Circuit	Townsville, Queensland	29–30 August	2020 Supercars Championship is located in Australia
8	Townsville SuperSprint	(Queensland) Reid Park Street Circuit	Townsville, Queensland	5–6 September	2020 Supercars Championship is located in Australia
9	The Bend SuperSprint	(South Australia) The Bend Motorsport Park	Tailem Bend, South Australia	19–20 September	2020 Supercars Championship is located in Australia
10	The Bend SuperSprint	(South Australia) The Bend Motorsport Park	Tailem Bend, South Australia	26–27 September	2020 Supercars Championship is located in Australia
11	Bathurst 1000	(New South Wales) Mount Panorama Circuit	Bathurst, New South Wales	18 October	2020 Supercars Championship is located in Australia

=== Calendar changes ===
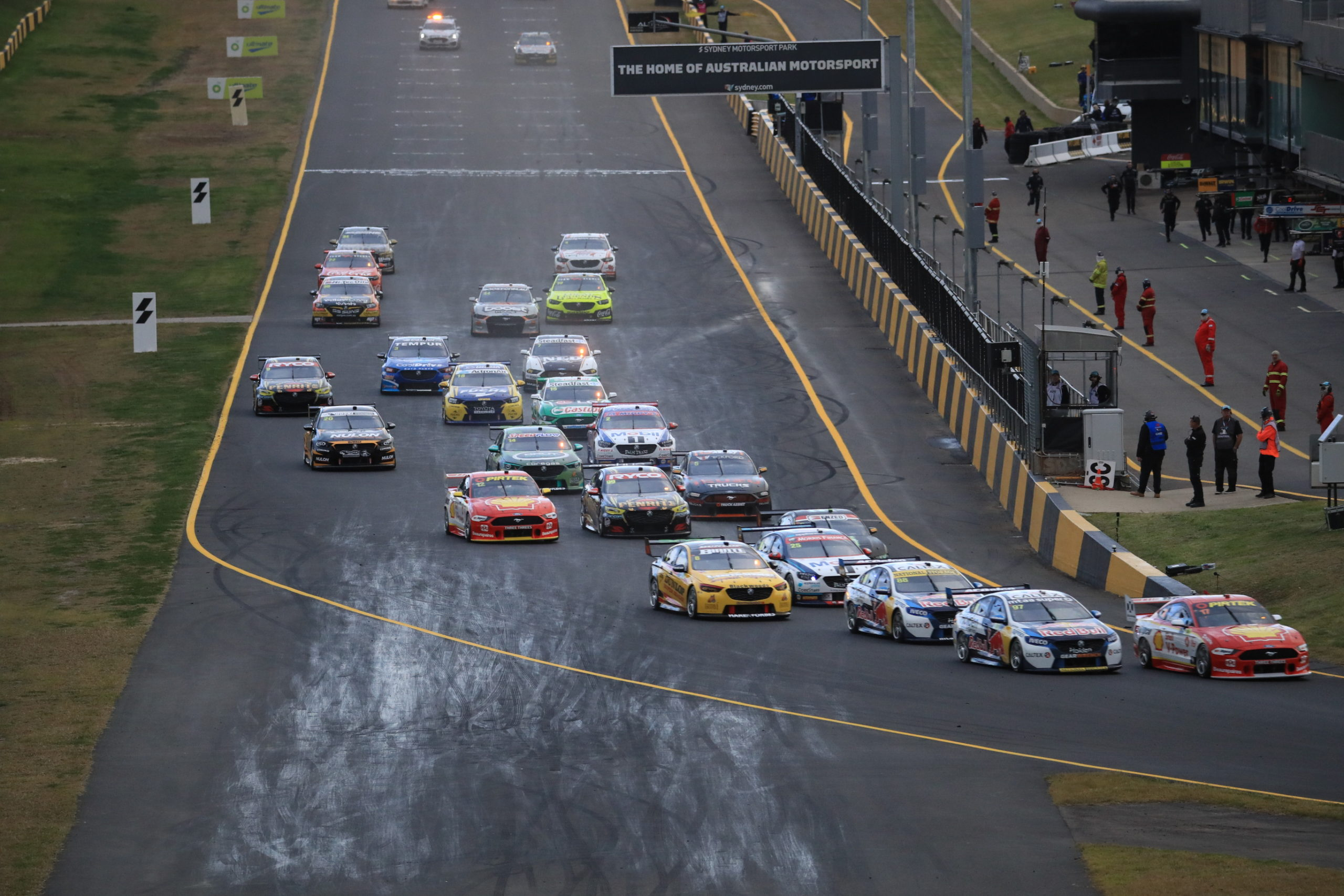
Sydney Motorsport Park hosted the Supercars return due the COVID-19 pandemic.

The Sydney SuperNight was originally scheduled to return to the calendar after a one-year absence, but was instead be the first event back after the enforced break due to the COVID-19 pandemic, and ran in daylight hours. Sydney Motorsport Park continued to host the event. The Gold Coast 600 was to have also become a night race. The Auckland Super400 moved from Pukekohe Park Raceway to Hampton Downs Motorsport Park. The change was made in response to Auckland Council passing legislation that prohibited from running any event at the circuit on key dates, with Anzac Day falling on the Saturday of the round.

The Bend 500 was scheduled to replace the Sandown 500 as the opening round the Enduro Cup. The Bend SuperSprint was re-formatted as a 500 kilometre race, while the Sandown round adopted a sprint format, called the Sandown Super400. This resulted in a 500 kilometre being restored as the first race of the Enduro Cup after the Bathurst 1000 was the first endurance race in 2019.

The Ipswich and Phillip Island SuperSprints were removed from the calendar. It was the first time since opening that Queensland Raceway has not been on the calendar and the first since 2004 for Phillip Island Grand Prix Circuit.

=== Impact of 2019–20 COVID-19 pandemic ===
The championship was disrupted by the COVID-19 pandemic, with the Melbourne 400 cancelled before the first race of the event. Supercars' management later announced that should an event be postponed, the calendar would have been altered to complete the 2020 fixture, and that a January 2021 finish may have been required to do so. Supercars later announced the postponement of the Launceston, Auckland and Perth rounds due to the pandemic. All three were later cancelled.

The championship recommenced in June with a reformatted round at Sydney Motorsport Park, with the postponed races assigned new dates later in the season. Races at Gold Coast and Newcastle were removed from the schedule.

Due to a spike in COVID-19 cases in Victoria, Sydney Motorsport Park hosted round four of the championship on the weekend of July 18–19 instead of Winton. The event followed the same format as the previous round but featured a night race on the Saturday night and fans were allowed to attend the event. This spike also caused the Sandown event to be removed from the calendar and replaced with two rounds at The Bend Motorsport Park on the weekends of September 19–20 and 26–27. This calendar revision also saw postponed races at Symmons Plains Raceway, Wanneroo Raceway and a scheduled third appearance at Sydney Motorsport Park cancelled.

== Rule changes ==
=== Format changes ===
The Saturday race at the SuperSprint and SuperNight events and the Darwin Triple Crown were due to be extended from 120 kilometres to 200 kilometres.

Proposed changes to the Melbourne 400 and a relocated Sandown 500 to The Bend Motorsport Park did not take place as the events were subsequently cancelled.

=== Technical changes ===
The number of engines that a team was allowed to use has been reduced to three, compared with four in 2019 in a bid to reduce costs. The piston ring and rocker ratios became control components and engines must complete 4,000 km (2,485 mi) before being rebuilt. Breaking the engine seal before reaching the mileage limit will result in a ten-place grid penalty, similar to Formula One's system of grid penalties for changing engine components. However, engine changes can be made with the approval of Supercars provided that teams present a clear reason for doing so.

A control shock absorber manufactured by Supashock was introduced in a bid to reducing costs. All cars had a reduction of downforce of up to twelve percent, in a bid to improve racing and encourage overtakes. The rear wing angle was reduced from 18 degrees to 13 degrees, and has gurney flaps of 13 millimetres and 10 millimetres on the wing plane and bootlid respectively. The Mustang's rear wing has also moved forward by 90 millimetres and lowered by 50 millimetres.

LED panels were to be fitted in the windows of all cars. To accommodate this, the car number on the front windscreen moved from the top-right to top-left corner. Originally scheduled to be introduced from the start of the season, due to production delays its introduction was postponed until 2021.

== Results and standings ==
=== Season summary ===
Round	Race	Event	Pole position	Fastest lap	Winning driver	Winning team	Report
1	1	Adelaide 500	(Australia) Jamie Whincup	(Australia) Chaz Mostert	(Australia) Jamie Whincup	Triple Eight Race Engineering	Report
1	2	Adelaide 500	(New Zealand) Shane van Gisbergen	(New Zealand) Shane van Gisbergen	(New Zealand) Scott McLaughlin	DJR Team Penske	Report
2	3	Melbourne 400	(New Zealand) Shane van Gisbergen	Cancelled due to the COVID-19 pandemic			Report
2	4	Melbourne 400	(Australia) Jamie Whincup	Cancelled due to the COVID-19 pandemic			Report
2	5	Melbourne 400	Cancelled due to the COVID-19 pandemic				Report
2	6	Melbourne 400	Cancelled due to the COVID-19 pandemic				Report
3	7	Sydney SuperSprint	(New Zealand) Scott McLaughlin	(Australia) Chaz Mostert	(New Zealand) Scott McLaughlin	DJR Team Penske	Report
3	8	Sydney SuperSprint	(Australia) Jamie Whincup	(Australia) David Reynolds	(Australia) Nick Percat	Brad Jones Racing	Report
3	9	Sydney SuperSprint	(New Zealand) Scott McLaughlin	(Australia) Bryce Fullwood	(New Zealand) Scott McLaughlin	DJR Team Penske	Report
4	10	Sydney SuperSprint	(New Zealand) Scott McLaughlin	(Australia) Anton de Pasquale	(New Zealand) Scott McLaughlin	DJR Team Penske	Report
4	11	Sydney SuperSprint	(New Zealand) Scott McLaughlin	(Australia) Chaz Mostert	(Australia) Nick Percat	Brad Jones Racing	Report
4	12	Sydney SuperSprint	(New Zealand) Andre Heimgartner	(New Zealand) Andre Heimgartner	(Australia) Jack Le Brocq	Tickford Racing	Report
5	13	Darwin Triple Crown	(New Zealand) Scott McLaughlin	(Australia) Anton de Pasquale	(Australia) Anton de Pasquale	Erebus Motorsport	Report
5	14	Darwin Triple Crown	(New Zealand) Scott McLaughlin	(Australia) Chaz Mostert	(New Zealand) Scott McLaughlin	DJR Team Penske	Report
5	15	Darwin Triple Crown	(New Zealand) Scott McLaughlin	(Australia) Jack Smith	(Australia) Jamie Whincup	Triple Eight Race Engineering	Report
6	16	Darwin SuperSprint	(Australia) Jamie Whincup	(Australia) Bryce Fullwood	(New Zealand) Scott McLaughlin	DJR Team Penske	Report
6	17	Darwin SuperSprint	(New Zealand) Scott McLaughlin	(Australia) James Courtney	(New Zealand) Scott McLaughlin	DJR Team Penske	Report
6	18	Darwin SuperSprint	(New Zealand) Shane van Gisbergen	(Australia) Scott Pye	(New Zealand) Scott McLaughlin	DJR Team Penske	Report
7	19	Townsville SuperSprint	(Australia) Jamie Whincup	(Australia) Cam Waters	(Australia) Jamie Whincup	Triple Eight Race Engineering	Report
7	20	Townsville SuperSprint	(Australia) Jamie Whincup	(New Zealand) Fabian Coulthard	(Australia) Jamie Whincup	Triple Eight Race Engineering	Report
7	21	Townsville SuperSprint	(New Zealand) Scott McLaughlin	(Australia) Cam Waters	(New Zealand) Scott McLaughlin	DJR Team Penske	Report
8	22	Townsville SuperSprint	(New Zealand) Scott McLaughlin	(New Zealand) Scott McLaughlin	(New Zealand) Scott McLaughlin	DJR Team Penske	Report
8	23	Townsville SuperSprint	(Australia) Nick Percat	(Australia) Chaz Mostert	(New Zealand) Shane van Gisbergen	Triple Eight Race Engineering	Report
8	24	Townsville SuperSprint	(Australia) Todd Hazelwood	(New Zealand) Shane van Gisbergen	(New Zealand) Shane van Gisbergen	Triple Eight Race Engineering	Report
9	25	The Bend SuperSprint	(Australia) Chaz Mostert	(Australia) Scott Pye	(New Zealand) Fabian Coulthard	DJR Team Penske	Report
9	26	The Bend SuperSprint	(New Zealand) Scott McLaughlin	(Australia) Chaz Mostert	(New Zealand) Shane van Gisbergen	Triple Eight Race Engineering	Report
9	27	The Bend SuperSprint	(New Zealand) Scott McLaughlin	(Australia) Jack Le Brocq	(New Zealand) Scott McLaughlin	DJR Team Penske	Report
10	28	The Bend SuperSprint	(New Zealand) Scott McLaughlin	(New Zealand) Shane van Gisbergen	(New Zealand) Scott McLaughlin	DJR Team Penske	Report
10	29	The Bend SuperSprint	(New Zealand) Scott McLaughlin	(Australia) Jack Le Brocq	(New Zealand) Scott McLaughlin	DJR Team Penske	Report
10	30	The Bend SuperSprint	(New Zealand) Scott McLaughlin	(New Zealand) Shane van Gisbergen	(Australia) Cam Waters	Tickford Racing	Report
11	31	Bathurst 1000	(Australia) Cam Waters	(New Zealand) Shane van Gisbergen	(New Zealand) Shane van Gisbergen (Australia) Garth Tander	Triple Eight Race Engineering	Report

=== Points system ===
Points were awarded for each race at an event, to the driver or drivers of a car that completed at least 75% of the race distance and was running at the completion of the race. At least 50% of the planned race distance must be completed for the result to be valid and championship points awarded.

Points format	Position																								
Points format	1st	2nd	3rd	4th	5th	6th	7th	8th	9th	10th	11th	12th	13th	14th	15th	16th	17th	18th	19th	20th	21st	22nd	23rd	24th	25th
Bathurst	300	276	258	240	222	204	192	180	168	156	144	138	132	126	120	114	108	102	96	90	84	78	72	66	60
Adelaide	150	138	129	120	111	102	96	90	84	78	72	69	66	63	60	57	54	51	48	45	42	39	36	33	
SuperSprint	100	92	86	80	74	68	64	60	56	52	48	46	44	42	40	38	36	34	32	30	28	26	24	22	
Melbourne	75	69	64	60	55	51	48	45	42	39	36	34	33	31	30	28	27	25	24	22	21	19	18	16	

- Bathurst: Used for the Bathurst 1000.
- Adelaide: Used for the Adelaide 500.
- SuperSprint: Used for all SuperSprint races and the Darwin Triple Crown.
- Melbourne: Used for the Melbourne 400.

=== Drivers' championship ===
Pos.	Driver	No.	ADE (South Australia)		MEL (Victoria (state))				SMP1 (New South Wales)			SMP2 (New South Wales)			HID1 (Northern Territory)			HID2 (Northern Territory)			TOW1 (Queensland)			TOW2 (Queensland)			BEN1 (South Australia)			BEN2 (South Australia)			BAT (New South Wales)	Pen.	Pts.
1	(New Zealand) Scott McLaughlin	17	2	1	C	C	C	C	**1**	3	**1**	**1**	**3**	14	**20**	**1**	**2**	1	**1**	1	7	6	**1**	**1**	2	3	14	**3**	**1**	**1**	**1**	**2**	5	0	2576
2	(Australia) Cam Waters	6	6	3	C	C	C	C	6	6	13	6	9	18	8	9	11	3	5	Ret	2	4	2	2	5	12	5	8	5	3	3	1	**2**	0	2125
3	(New Zealand) Shane van Gisbergen	97	3	**Ret**	**C**	C	C	C	2	7	6	4	8	12	11	4	3	8	2	**5**	19	3	8	Ret	1	1	9	1	14	2	5	5	1	0	2095
4	(Australia) Jamie Whincup	88/888	**1**	5	C	**C**	C	C	3	**2**	3	5	17	8	17	2	1	**2**	6	7	**1**	**1**	3	4	3	2	18	17	3	10	7	3	Ret	0	2049
5	(Australia) Chaz Mostert	25	7	2	C	C	C	C	4	4	16	11	5	9	7	8	4	9	18	6	3	2	24	3	10	4	**11**	11	16	11	8	6	3	0	1958
6	(New Zealand) Fabian Coulthard	12	10	9	C	C	C	C	10	15	Ret	7	2	13	6	3	5	10	4	11	4	15	17	7	20	8	1	4	2	9	Ret	8	4	0	1800
7	(Australia) Nick Percat	8	22	7	C	C	C	C	5	1	9	9	1	11	Ret	6	6	5	13	2	Ret	5	4	6	**4**	7	10	9	17	6	6	4	18	0	1743
8	(Australia) Anton de Pasquale	99	14	Ret	C	C	C	C	8	12	7	3	13	19	1	7	23	6	12	9	10	8	7	5	16	Ret	8	5	4	5	2	11	9	0	1637
9	(Australia) Scott Pye	20	15	Ret	C	C	C	C	17	11	12	12	21	5	3	16	22	13	3	3	9	9	6	9	6	5	7	13	6	12	19	12	6	0	1586
10	(Australia) Mark Winterbottom	18	8	11	C	C	C	C	9	8	5	10	14	6	4	11	7	11	9	4	12	17	10	14	9	13	17	15	Ret	8	12	16	8	0	1566
11	(New Zealand) Lee Holdsworth	5	12	6	C	C	C	C	7	13	2	2	19	15	10	14	12	7	8	12	13	11	9	16	8	10	12	23	11	13	Ret	9	7	0	1553
12	(Australia) David Reynolds	9	4	8	C	C	C	C	21	5	4	14	11	4	13	5	9	12	16	10	5	10	11	Ret	15	11	13	7	9	16	Ret	17	15	0	1492
13	(Australia) James Courtney	19/44	Ret	15					12	9	14	19	4	16	2	12	17	4	7	14	6	7	13	10	13	9	15	14	Ret	7	4	10	10	0	1476
14	(New Zealand) Andre Heimgartner	7	11	10	C	C	C	C	15	10	15	17	12	**2**	9	10	16	15	10	8	Ret	14	15	18	24	17	4	2	7	14	10	14	11	0	1444
15	(Australia) Jack Le Brocq	55	16	12	C	C	C	C	19	14	11	16	16	1	14	15	8	Ret	14	13	15	12	16	8	7	14	2	10	21	4	13	19	14	0	1396
16	(Australia) Rick Kelly	15	9	13	C	C	C	C	14	19	17	18	6	17	15	13	10	14	11	22	17	20	14	11	11	16	6	6	8	23	9	15	17	0	1316
17	(Australia) Todd Hazelwood	14	13	14	C	C	C	C	11	18	8	13	20	3	18	20	20	16	15	15	Ret	13	5	12	14	**6**	24	12	10	19	11	7	Ret	0	1181
18	(Australia) Bryce Fullwood	2	21	17	C	C	C	C	13	20	10	15	15	7	21	18	19	19	17	17	8	19	12	17	12	18	3	16	19	15	18	13	Ret	0	1092
19	(Australia) Macauley Jones	3	17	19	C	C	C	C	18	16	20	8	22	23	Ret	23	18	17	23	18	Ret	18	21	19	18	19	20	18	12	17	14	18	13	0	980
20	(New Zealand) Chris Pither	22	19	Ret	C	C	C	C	20	22	23	21	18	22	5	21	21	Ret	20	19	11	24	23	21	21	Ret	21	19	15	20	15	23	16	0	866
21	(Australia) Garry Jacobson	35	Ret	20	C	C	C	C	16	21	19	22	7	24	19	19	13	22	24	16	14	16	18	15	17	20	19	22	13	18	Ret	21	Ret	0	833
22	(Australia) Jack Smith	4	20	18	C	C	C	C	23	23	18	23	10	21	12	24	15	20	19	23	16	23	22	22	22	21	23	21	22	21	17	22	Ret	0	812
23	(Australia) Alex Davison	19			C	C	C	C	Ret	17	21	20	23	20	16	17	24	18	22	20	18	22	20	13	19	15	22	20	18	22	DNS	DNS	12	0	794
24	(Australia) Will Davison	23/6	5	4	C	C	C	C																									2	0	507
25	(Australia) Zane Goddard	34	18	16								24	24	10				21	21	21	Ret	21	19				16	24	20				Ret	0	438
26	(Australia) Garth Tander	97																															1	0	300
27	(Australia) Jake Kostecki	34			C	C	C	C	22	24	22				Ret	22	14							20	23	22				Ret	16	20	Ret	0	290
28	(Australia) Warren Luff	25																															3	0	258
29	(Australia) Tony D'Alberto	12																															4	0	240
30	(Australia) Tim Slade	17																															5	0	222
31	(Australia) Dean Fiore	20																															6	0	204
32	(Australia) Michael Caruso	5																															7	0	192
33	(Australia) James Golding	18																															8	0	180
34	(Australia) Brodie Kostecki	99																															9	0	168
35	(Australia) Broc Feeney	44																															10	0	156
36	(Australia) Dylan O'Keeffe	7																															11	0	144
37	(Australia) Jonathon Webb	19																															12	0	138
38	(Australia) Tim Blanchard	3																															13	0	132
39	(Australia) James Moffat	55																															14	0	126
40	(Australia) Will Brown	9																															15	0	120
41	(Australia) Steve Owen	22																															16	0	114
42	(Australia) Dale Wood	15																															17	0	108
43	(Australia) Thomas Randle	8																															18	0	102
44	(Australia) Tyler Everingham	40																															19	0	96
45	(Australia) Jayden Ojeda	40																															19	0	96
–	(Australia) Kurt Kostecki	2																															Ret	0	0
–	(Australia) Jack Perkins	4																															Ret	0	0
–	(Australia) Jordan Boys	14																															Ret	0	0
–	(Australia) David Russell	35																															Ret	0	0
–	(Australia) Craig Lowndes	888																															Ret	0	0
Pos.	Driver	No.	ADE (South Australia)		MEL (Victoria (state))				SMP1 (New South Wales)			SMP2 (New South Wales)			HID1 (Northern Territory)			HID2 (Northern Territory)			TOW1 (Queensland)			TOW2 (Queensland)			BEN1 (South Australia)			BEN2 (South Australia)			BAT (New South Wales)	Pen.	Pts.

Key
Colour	Result
Gold	Winner
Silver	Second place
Bronze	Third place
Green	Other points position
Blue	Other classified position
Blue	Not classified, finished (NC)
Purple	Not classified, retired (Ret)
Red	Did not qualify (DNQ)
Red	Did not pre-qualify (DNPQ)
Black	Disqualified (DSQ)
White	Did not start (DNS)
White	Race cancelled (C)
Blank	Did not practice (DNP)
Blank	Excluded (EX)
Blank	Did not arrive (DNA)
Blank	Withdrawn (WD)
Blank	Did not enter (cell empty)
Text formatting	Meaning
**Bold**	Pole position
Italics	Fastest lap

=== Teams' championship ===
Pos.	Team	No.	ADE (South Australia)		MEL (Victoria (state))				SMP1 (New South Wales)			SMP2 (New South Wales)			HID1 (Northern Territory)			HID2 (Northern Territory)			TOW1 (Queensland)			TOW2 (Queensland)			BEN1 (South Australia)			BEN2 (South Australia)			BAT (New South Wales)	Pen.	Pts.
1	DJR Team Penske	12	10	9	C	C	C	C	10	15	Ret	7	2	13	6	3	5	10	4	11	4	15	17	7	20	8	1	4	2	9	Ret	8	4	0	4376
1	DJR Team Penske	17	2	1	C	C	C	C	**1**	3	**1**	**1**	**3**	14	**20**	**1**	**2**	1	**1**	1	7	6	**1**	**1**	2	3	14	**3**	**1**	**1**	**1**	**2**	5	0	4376
2	Triple Eight Race Engineering	88/888	**1**	5	C	**C**	C	C	3	**2**	3	5	17	8	17	2	1	**2**	6	7	**1**	**1**	3	4	3	2	18	17	3	10	7	3	Ret	30	4114
2	Triple Eight Race Engineering	97	3	**Ret**	**C**	C	C	C	2	7	6	4	8	12	11	4	3	8	2	**5**	19	3	8	Ret	1	1	9	1	14	2	5	5	1	30	4114
3	Tickford Racing	6	6	3	C	C	C	C	6	6	13	6	9	18	8	9	11	3	5	Ret	2	4	2	2	5	12	5	8	5	3	3	1	**2**	0	3521
3	Tickford Racing	55	16	12	C	C	C	C	19	14	11	16	16	1	14	15	8	Ret	14	13	15	12	16	8	7	14	2	10	21	4	13	19	14	0	3521
4	Tickford Racing/ 23Red Racing	5	12	6	C	C	C	C	7	13	2	2	19	15	10	14	12	7	8	12	13	11	9	16	8	10	12	23	11	13	Ret	9	7	0	3200
4	Tickford Racing/ 23Red Racing	23	5	4	C	C	C	C																										0	3200
4	Tickford Racing/ 23Red Racing	44							12	9	14	19	4	16	2	12	17	4	7	14	6	7	13	10	13	9	15	14	Ret	7	4	10	10	0	3200
5	Erebus Motorsport	9	4	8	C	C	C	C	21	5	4	14	11	4	13	5	9	12	16	10	5	10	11	Ret	15	11	13	7	9	16	Ret	17	15	0	3129
5	Erebus Motorsport	99	14	Ret	C	C	C	C	8	12	7	3	13	19	1	7	23	6	12	9	10	8	7	5	16	Ret	8	5	4	5	2	11	9	0	3129
6	Team 18	18	8	11	C	C	C	C	9	8	5	10	14	6	4	11	7	11	9	4	12	17	10	14	9	13	17	15	Ret	8	12	16	8	30	3122
6	Team 18	20	15	Ret	C	C	C	C	17	11	12	12	21	5	3	16	22	13	3	3	9	9	6	9	6	5	7	13	6	12	19	12	6	30	3122
7	Walkinshaw Andretti United	2	21	17	C	C	C	C	13	20	10	15	15	7	21	18	19	19	17	17	8	19	12	17	12	18	3	16	19	15	18	13	Ret	0	3050
7	Walkinshaw Andretti United	25	7	2	C	C	C	C	4	4	16	11	5	9	7	8	4	9	18	6	3	2	24	3	10	4	**11**	11	16	11	8	6	3	0	3050
8	Brad Jones Racing	8	22	7	C	C	C	C	5	1	9	9	1	11	Ret	6	6	5	13	2	Ret	5	4	6	**4**	7	10	9	17	6	6	4	18	0	2924
8	Brad Jones Racing	14	13	14	C	C	C	C	11	18	8	13	20	3	18	20	20	16	15	15	Ret	13	5	12	14	**6**	24	12	10	19	11	7	Ret	0	2924
9	Kelly Racing	7	11	10	C	C	C	C	15	10	15	17	12	**2**	9	10	16	15	10	8	Ret	14	15	18	24	17	4	2	7	14	10	14	11	0	2760
9	Kelly Racing	15	9	13	C	C	C	C	14	19	17	18	6	17	15	13	10	14	11	22	17	20	14	11	11	16	6	6	8	23	9	15	17	0	2760
10	Tim Blanchard Racing/ Brad Jones Racing	3	17	19	C	C	C	C	18	16	20	8	22	23	Ret	23	18	17	23	18	Ret	18	21	19	18	19	20	18	12	17	14	18	13	0	1792
10	Tim Blanchard Racing/ Brad Jones Racing	4	20	18	C	C	C	C	23	23	18	23	10	21	12	24	15	20	19	23	16	23	22	22	22	21	23	21	22	21	17	22	Ret	0	1792
11	Team Sydney by Tekno	19	Ret	15	C	C	C	C	Ret	17	21	20	23	20	16	17	24	18	22	20	18	22	20	13	19	15	22	20	18	22	DNS	DNS	12	0	1720
11	Team Sydney by Tekno	22	19	Ret	C	C	C	C	20	22	23	21	18	22	5	21	21	Ret	20	19	11	24	23	21	21	Ret	21	19	15	20	15	23	16	0	1720
12	Matt Stone Racing	34	18	16	C	C	C	C	22	24	22	24	24	10	Ret	22	14	21	21	21	Ret	21	19	20	23	22	16	24	20	Ret	16	20	Ret	0	1561
12	Matt Stone Racing	35	Ret	20	C	C	C	C	16	21	19	22	7	24	19	19	13	22	24	16	14	16	18	15	17	20	19	22	13	18	Ret	21	Ret	0	1561
13	Garry Rogers Motorsport (w)	40																															19	0	96
Pos.	Team	No.	ADE (South Australia)		MEL (Victoria (state))				SMP1 (New South Wales)			SMP2 (New South Wales)			HID1 (Northern Territory)			HID2 (Northern Territory)			TOW1 (Queensland)			TOW2 (Queensland)			BEN1 (South Australia)			BEN2 (South Australia)			BAT (New South Wales)	Pen.	Pts.

Key
Colour	Result
Gold	Winner
Silver	Second place
Bronze	Third place
Green	Other points position
Blue	Other classified position
Blue	Not classified, finished (NC)
Purple	Not classified, retired (Ret)
Red	Did not qualify (DNQ)
Red	Did not pre-qualify (DNPQ)
Black	Disqualified (DSQ)
White	Did not start (DNS)
White	Race cancelled (C)
Blank	Did not practice (DNP)
Blank	Excluded (EX)
Blank	Did not arrive (DNA)
Blank	Withdrawn (WD)
Blank	Did not enter (cell empty)
Text formatting	Meaning
**Bold**	Pole position
Italics	Fastest lap

- (w) denotes wildcard entry.
