= Matt McLean (disambiguation) =

Matt McLean may refer to:

- Matt McLean (born 1988), American swimmer
- Matt McLean (racing driver) (born 1996), Australian racer
- Matty McLean (born 1986), New Zealand television presenter

== See also ==
- Matthew McLean (born 1986), Welsh rugby union player
