= Mason Barbera =

Australian racing driver

- Born: 10 November 1997 (age 29); Bundaberg, Australia
- Other name: Racin'
- Height: 1.97 m (6 ft 5 1/2 in)

Super2 Series
- Years active: 2017–2019
- Teams: Garry Rogers Motorsport
- Starts: 38
- Wins: 0
- Poles: 1
- Fastest laps: 0
- Best finish: 13th in 2018
- Statistics up to date as of April 2022.

Mason Guy Reece "Racin'" Barbera (born 10 November 1997 in Bundaberg) is a racing driver from Australia.

== Career Summery ==
=== Karting ===
Barbera competed in various karting championships from 2009 to 2014. He competed in his home state of Queensland, New South Wales, South Australia and Victoria. He won multiple state and national titles.

=== V8 Ute Series ===
Barbera joined the V8 Ute Racing Series in both Australia (2014-2017) and New Zealand (2014-2015).

Barbera had won races but never really made a charge for the championship. In 2015, he had his license suspended for a deliberate accident at the Bathurst. This after he was hospitalized after an accident at Sandown.

=== Supercars ===
Barbera was to make his debut in the Kumho V8 Series in 2015, but couldn't because of an accident driving in the V8 Ute Series.

Barbera competed in the Dunlop Super2 Series for Garry Rogers Motorsport in the 2017, 2018 and 2019 seasons. In the 2019 season, he scored a pole position in Adelaide. He did not finish the season in Super2 and did not compete at the Bathurst 1000 due to family reasons.

== Career results ==
=== Karting career summary ===
Season	Series	Position
2009	Australian National Sprint Kart Championships - Junior National Heavy	29th
2013	Australian National Sprint Kart Championships - Clubman Super Heavy	5th
2013	Queensland State Kart Championships - Clubman Super Heavy	1st
2013	South Australia State Kart Championships - Leopard Heavy	2nd
2014	Australian Formula Rotax National Championships - Formula Rotax Heavy	1st
2014	Australian National Sprint Kart Championships - X30 Heavy	10th
2014	NSW State Kart Championships - Rotax Heavy	1st
2014	NSW State Kart Championships - DD2	1st
2014	Jurgens Caravans Victorian Open - Rotax Heavy	2nd

=== Circuit racing career summary ===
Season	Series	Position	Car	Team
2014	Australian V8 Ute Racing Series	63rd	Ford Falcon FG Ute	Peters Motorsport
2014	New Zealand V8 Ute Racing Series	8th	Ford Falcon FG Ute	Mason Barbera
2015	Australian V8 Ute Racing Series	23rd	Ford Falcon FG Ute	Peters Motorsport
2015	New Zealand V8 Ute Racing Series	7th	Ford Falcon FG Ute	Mason Barbera
2016	Australian V8 Ute Racing Series	5th	Ford Falcon FG Ute	Peters Motorsport
2017	Australian V8 Ute Racing Series	12th	Ford Falcon FG Ute	Peters Motorsport
2017	Dunlop Super2 Series	17th	Holden VF Commodore	Garry Rogers Motorsport
2018	Dunlop Super2 Series	13th	Holden VF Commodore	Garry Rogers Motorsport
2019	Dunlop Super2 Series	17th	Holden VF Commodore	Garry Rogers Motorsport

=== V8 Supercars Development Series results ===
(key) (Race results only)

V8 Supercars Development Series results
Year	Team	Car	1	2	3	4	5	6	7	8	9	10	11	12	13	14	15	16	17	18	19	20	21	Position	Points
2017	Garry Rogers Motorsport	Holden VF Commodore	ADE; 13	ADE; 9	ADE; 11	SYM; Ret	SYM; Ret	SYM; 15	SYM; 13	PHI; 14	PHI; 16	PHI; 18	PHI; 18	TOW; 21	TOW; 8	SMP; Ret	SMP; 18	SMP; 16	SMP; 10	SAN; 17	SAN; 10	NEW; Ret	NEW; 15	17th	706
2018	Garry Rogers Motorsport	Holden VF Commodore	ADE; Ret	ADE; 11	ADE; 10	SYM; 11	SYM; 17	SYM; Ret	BAR; 5	BAR; 8	BAR; 10	TOW; 16	TOW; 17	SAN; 11	SAN; 11	BAT; 6	NEW; 8	NEW; C						13th	849
2019	Garry Rogers Motorsport	Holden VF Commodore	ADE; 3	ADE; 4	ADE; 7	BAR; 12	BAR; 14	TOW; Ret	TOW; 13	QLD; 13	QLD; 7	BAT	SAN	SAN	NEW	NEW								17th	590
