= 2017 Super2 Series =

Motor racing competition

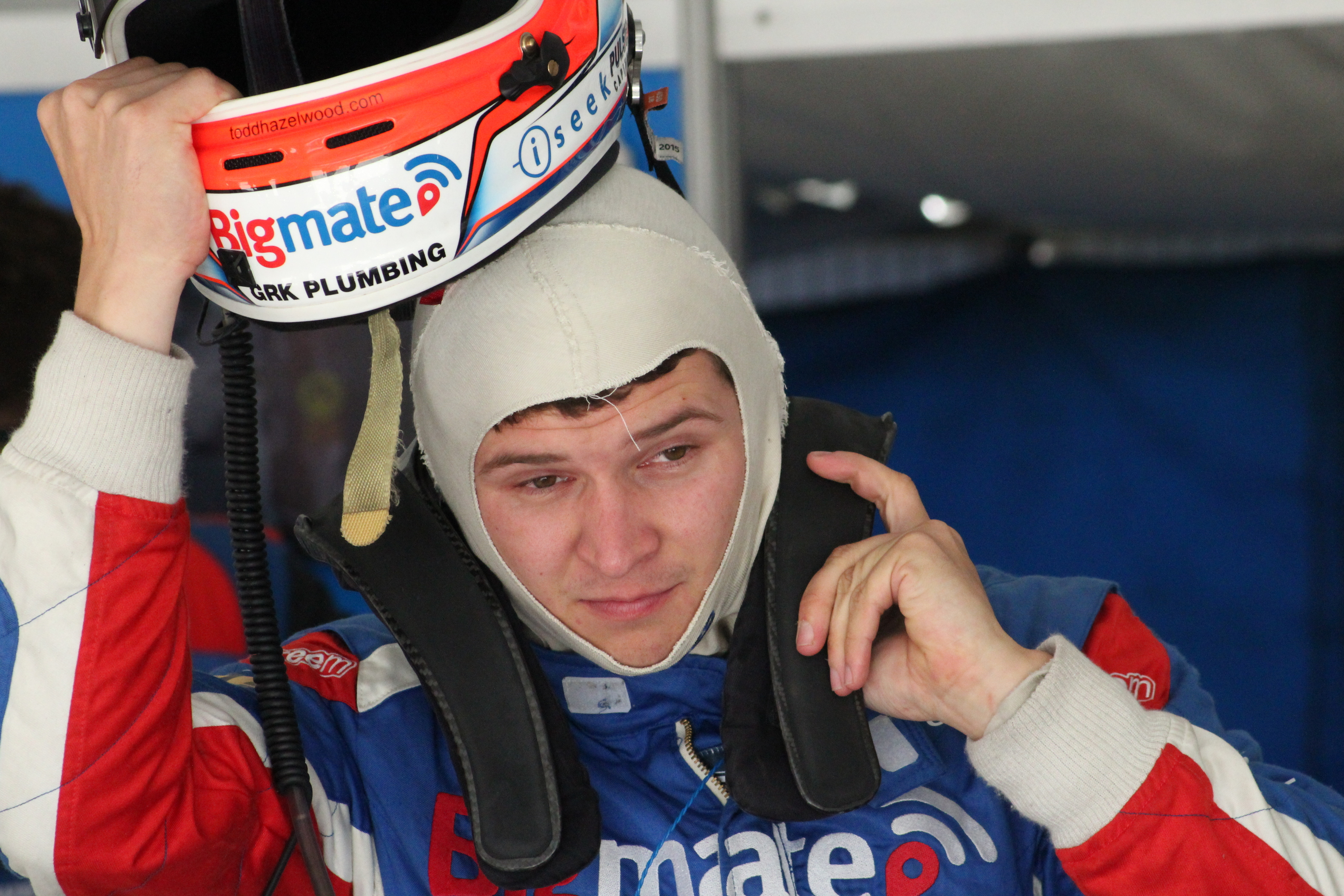
Todd Hazelwood won the 2017 Dunlop Super2 Series

The 2017 Super2 Series (known for commercial reasons as the 2017 Dunlop Super2 Series) was an Australian motor racing competition for Supercars, staged as a support series to the Virgin Australia Supercars Championship. It was the eighteenth annual Supercars Development Series.

The series was won by Todd Hazelwood, driving a Holden VF Commodore for Matt Stone Racing.

A few substantial changes were seen for the 2017 season including the new rules of the Super2 program. This saw the opportunity for Dunlop Series teams to field a Wildcard entry in up to two of the four Virgin Australia Supercars Championship events at Winton, Barbagallo Raceway, Hidden Valley and Queensland Raceway. This program was developed to encourage more cars and teams to get involved in the Supercars Championship. The Bathurst round of the Super2 Series became a non-pointscoring round for the first time since 2004, to encourage more cars and teams to submit wildcard entries for the Bathurst 1000.

== Teams and drivers ==
The following teams and drivers competed in the series.

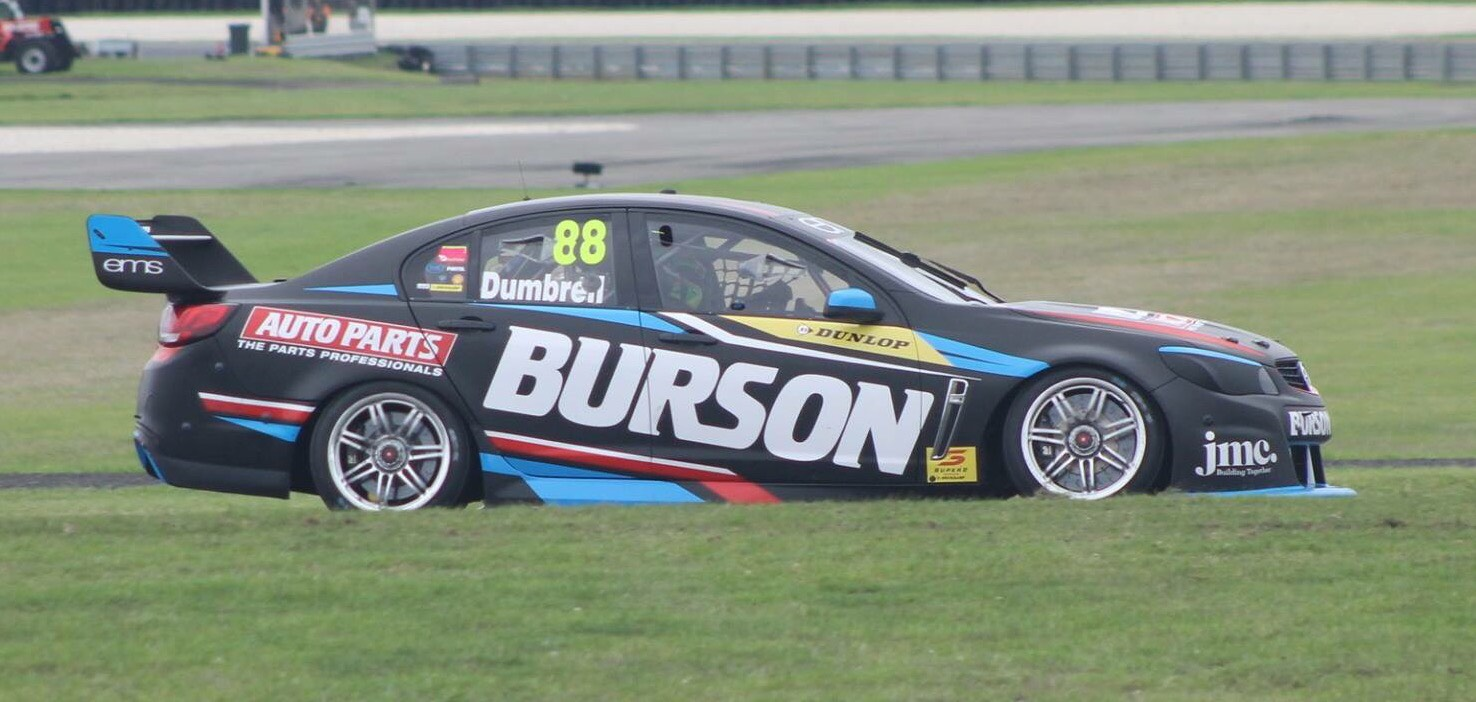
Paul Dumbrell placed second driving a Holden Commodore VF

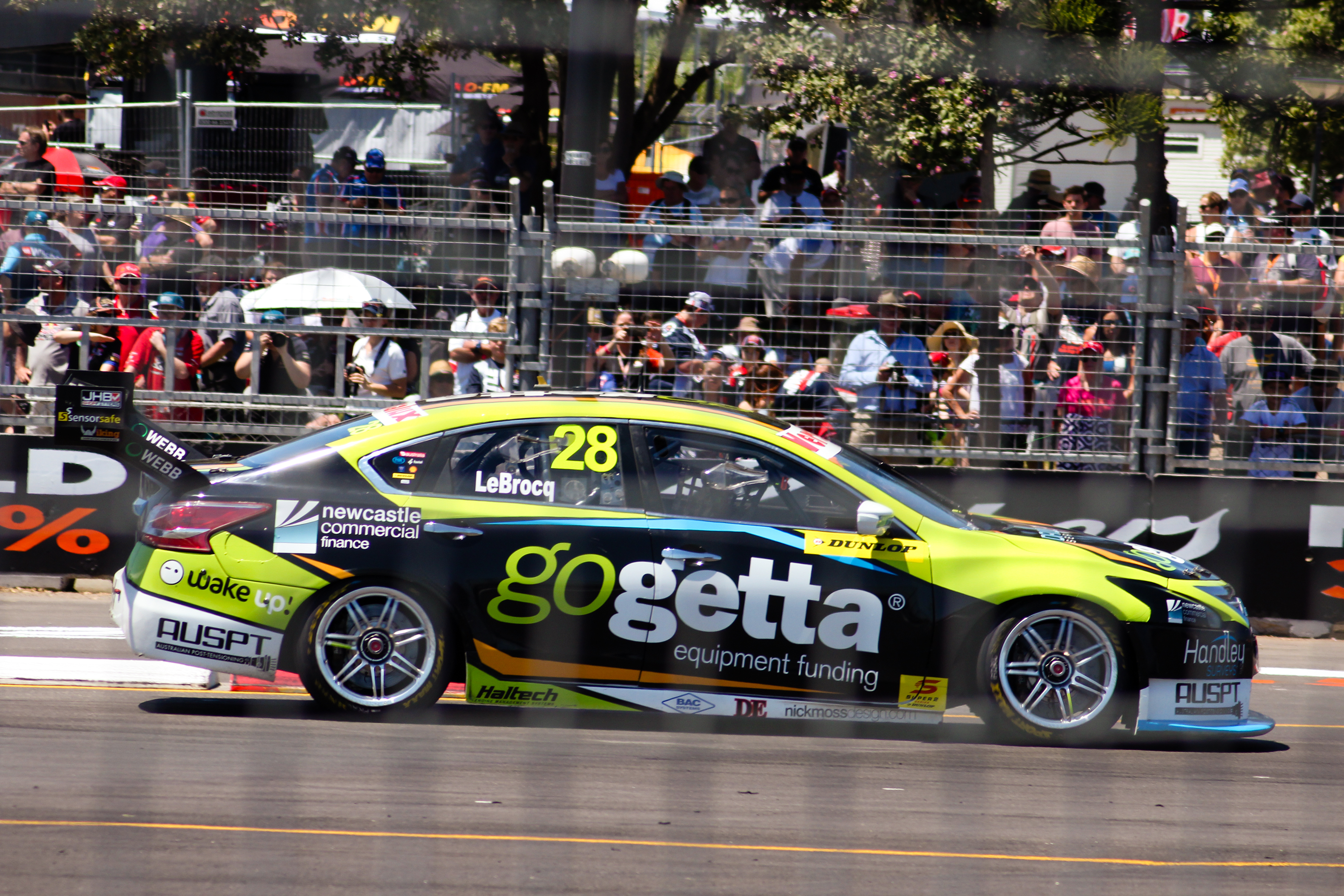
Jack LeBrocq placed third driving a Nissan Altima

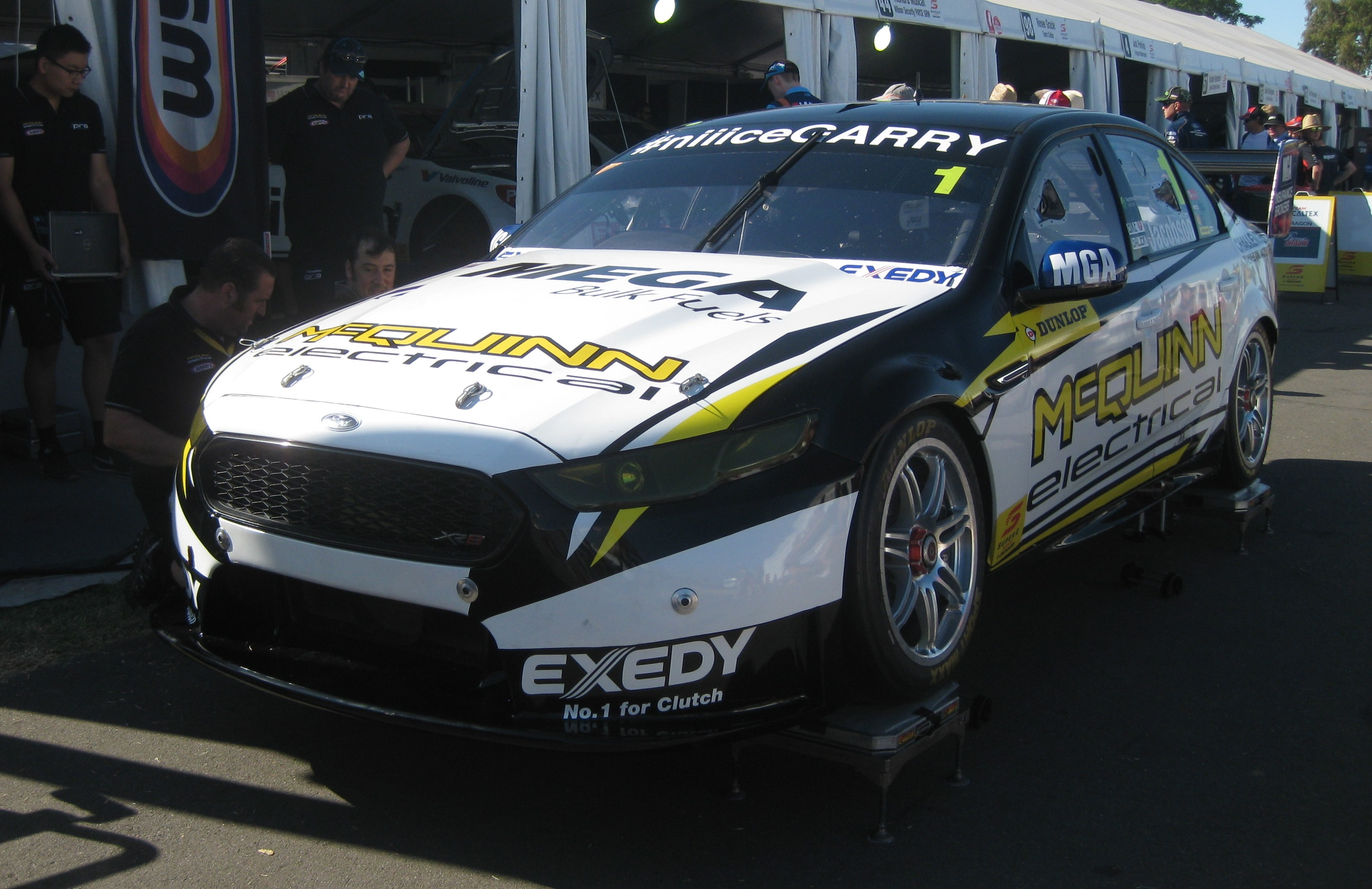
Garry Jacobson placed sixth in the series driving a Ford Falcon FG X

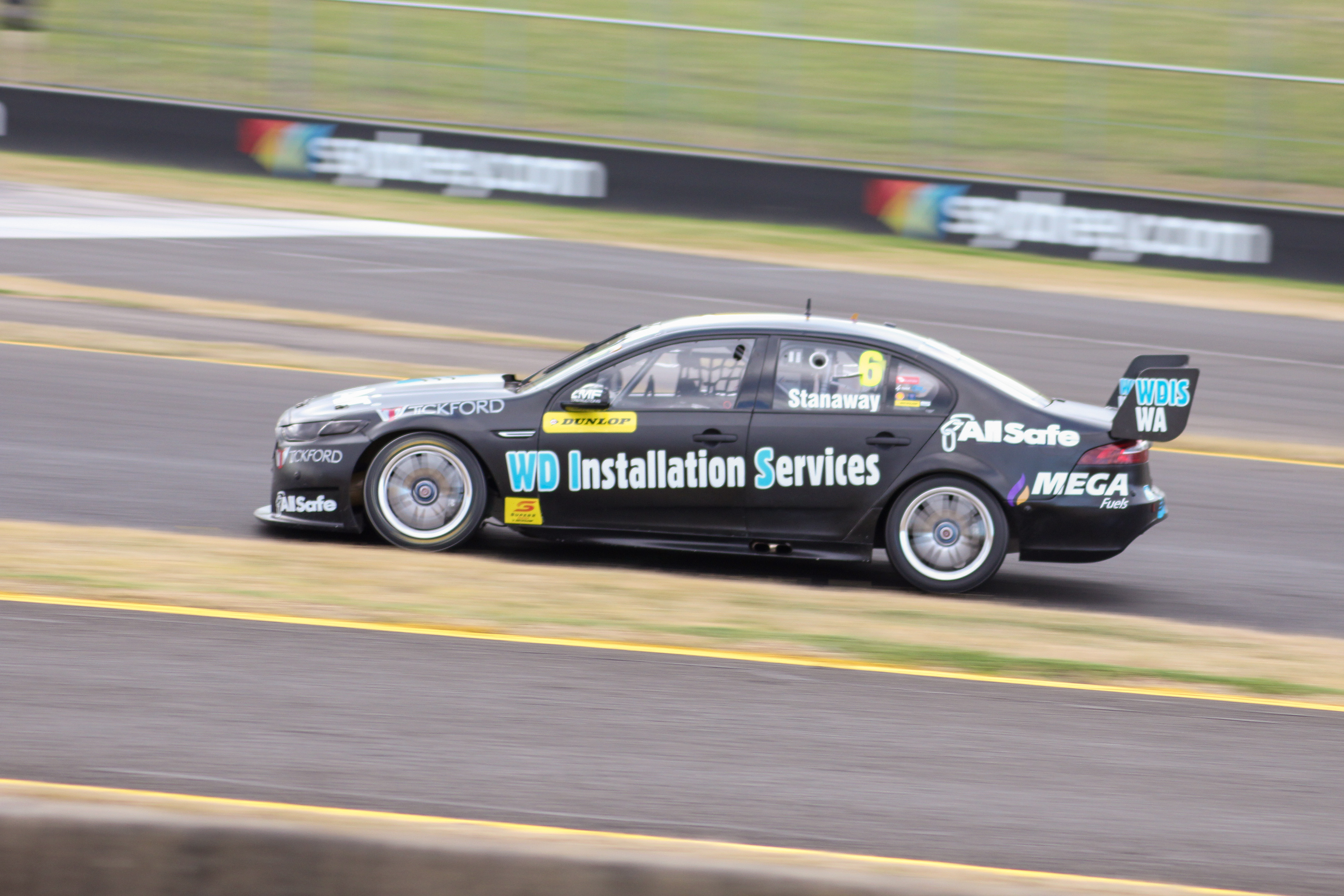
Richie Stanaway in his one-off Super2 appearance at Sydney Motorsport Park

Manufacturer	Model	Team	No.	Driver	Rounds
Ford	Falcon FG X	Prodrive Racing Australia	1	(Australia) Garry Jacobson	All
Ford	Falcon FG X	Prodrive Racing Australia	5	(Australia) Josh Kean	All
Ford	Falcon FG X	Prodrive Racing Australia	6	(New Zealand) Richie Stanaway	5
Ford	Falcon FG X	Paul Morris Motorsport	67	(Australia) Anton de Pasquale	All
Ford	Falcon FG	MW Motorsport	16	(Australia) Bryce Fullwood	1–3
Ford	Falcon FG	Dragon Motor Racing	48	(Australia) Matt Palmer	All
Ford	Falcon FG	Sherriff Electrical/ABC Towing	50	(Australia) Gerard McLeod	4
Ford	Falcon FG	Matt Stone Racing	57	(Australia) Brodie Kostecki	All
Holden	Commodore VF	Dragon Motor Racing; Image Racing	4	(Australia) Jack Perkins	All
Holden	Commodore VF	Dragon Motor Racing; Image Racing	98	(Australia) Renee Gracie	1–5
Holden	Commodore VF	Dragon Motor Racing; Image Racing	98	(Australia) Jordan Boys	6–7
Holden	Commodore VF	Brad Jones Racing	8	(Australia) Andrew Jones	All
Holden	Commodore VF	Brad Jones Racing	14	(Australia) Macauley Jones	All
Holden	Commodore VF	Brad Jones Racing	21	(Australia) Jack Smith	All
Holden	Commodore VF	Matt Stone Racing	15	(Australia) Adam Marjoram	All
Holden	Commodore VF	Matt Stone Racing	35	(Australia) Todd Hazelwood	All
Holden	Commodore VF	Matt Chahda Motorsport	18	(Australia) Matt Chahda	All
Holden	Commodore VF	Eggleston Motorsport	38	(Australia) Will Brown	All
Holden	Commodore VF	Eggleston Motorsport	54	(Australia) Nathan Morcom	All
Holden	Commodore VF	Eggleston Motorsport	88	(Australia) Paul Dumbrell	All
Holden	Commodore VF	Garry Rogers Motorsport	44	(Australia) Richard Muscat	All
Holden	Commodore VF	Garry Rogers Motorsport	99	(Australia) Mason Barbera	All
Holden	Commodore VF	Kostecki Brothers Racing	55	(Australia) Kurt Kostecki	All
Holden	Commodore VF	Kostecki Brothers Racing	56	(Australia) Jake Kostecki	1–6
Nissan	Altima L33	MW Motorsport	16	(Australia) Bryce Fullwood	4–7
Nissan	Altima L33	MW Motorsport	26	(Australia) Shae Davies	All
Nissan	Altima L33	MW Motorsport	28	(Australia) Jack Le Brocq	All

== Calendar ==
The 2017 calendar was released on 27 September 2016.

Round		Event name	Circuit	Location	Date	Race winner	Round winner
1	1	(South Australia) Clipsal 500 Adelaide	Adelaide Street Circuit	Adelaide, South Australia	3 March	(Australia) Paul Dumbrell	(Australia) Paul Dumbrell
1	2	(South Australia) Clipsal 500 Adelaide	Adelaide Street Circuit	Adelaide, South Australia	4 March	(Australia) Paul Dumbrell	(Australia) Paul Dumbrell
1	3	(South Australia) Clipsal 500 Adelaide	Adelaide Street Circuit	Adelaide, South Australia	5 March	(Australia) Todd Hazelwood	(Australia) Paul Dumbrell
2	4	Tyrepower Tasmania SuperSprint	Symmons Plains Raceway	Launceston, Tasmania	7 April	(Australia) Paul Dumbrell	(Australia) Paul Dumbrell
2	5	Tyrepower Tasmania SuperSprint	Symmons Plains Raceway	Launceston, Tasmania	8 April	(Australia) Paul Dumbrell	(Australia) Paul Dumbrell
2	6	Tyrepower Tasmania SuperSprint	Symmons Plains Raceway	Launceston, Tasmania	8 April	(Australia) Todd Hazelwood	(Australia) Paul Dumbrell
2	7	Tyrepower Tasmania SuperSprint	Symmons Plains Raceway	Launceston, Tasmania	9 April	(Australia) Jack Le Brocq	(Australia) Paul Dumbrell
3	8	(Victoria (state)) WD-40 Phillip Island 500	Phillip Island Grand Prix Circuit	Phillip Island, Victoria	21 April	(Australia) Garry Jacobson	(Australia) Anton de Pasquale
3	9	(Victoria (state)) WD-40 Phillip Island 500	Phillip Island Grand Prix Circuit	Phillip Island, Victoria	22 April	(Australia) Jack Le Brocq	(Australia) Anton de Pasquale
3	10	(Victoria (state)) WD-40 Phillip Island 500	Phillip Island Grand Prix Circuit	Phillip Island, Victoria	22 April	(Australia) Jack Le Brocq	(Australia) Anton de Pasquale
3	11	(Victoria (state)) WD-40 Phillip Island 500	Phillip Island Grand Prix Circuit	Phillip Island, Victoria	23 April	(Australia) Anton de Pasquale	(Australia) Anton de Pasquale
4	12	(Queensland) Townsville 400	Townsville Street Circuit	Townsville, Queensland	8 July	(Australia) Todd Hazelwood	(Australia) Todd Hazelwood
4	13	(Queensland) Townsville 400	Townsville Street Circuit	Townsville, Queensland	9 July	(Australia) Todd Hazelwood	(Australia) Todd Hazelwood
5	14	(New South Wales) Red Rooster Sydney SuperSprint	Sydney Motorsport Park	Eastern Creek, New South Wales	18 August	(Australia) Paul Dumbrell	(Australia) Anton de Pasquale
5	15	(New South Wales) Red Rooster Sydney SuperSprint	Sydney Motorsport Park	Eastern Creek, New South Wales	19 August	(Australia) Paul Dumbrell	(Australia) Anton de Pasquale
5	16	(New South Wales) Red Rooster Sydney SuperSprint	Sydney Motorsport Park	Eastern Creek, New South Wales	19 August	(Australia) Anton de Pasquale	(Australia) Anton de Pasquale
5	17	(New South Wales) Red Rooster Sydney SuperSprint	Sydney Motorsport Park	Eastern Creek, New South Wales	20 August	(New Zealand) Richie Stanaway	(Australia) Anton de Pasquale
6	18	(Victoria (state)) Wilson Security Sandown 500	Sandown Raceway	Melbourne, Victoria	16 September	(Australia) Paul Dumbrell	(Australia) Jack Le Brocq
6	19	(Victoria (state)) Wilson Security Sandown 500	Sandown Raceway	Melbourne, Victoria	17 September	(Australia) Jack Le Brocq	(Australia) Jack Le Brocq
NC		(New South Wales) Supercheap Auto Bathurst 1000	Mount Panorama Circuit	Bathurst, New South Wales	7 October	(Australia) Macauley Jones	Non-championship round
7	20	(New South Wales) Coates Hire Newcastle 500	Newcastle Street Circuit	Newcastle, New South Wales	25 November	(Australia) Todd Hazelwood	(Australia) Todd Hazelwood
7	21	(New South Wales) Coates Hire Newcastle 500	Newcastle Street Circuit	Newcastle, New South Wales	26 November	(Australia) Todd Hazelwood	(Australia) Todd Hazelwood

== Points system ==
Points were awarded in each race as follows.

Round format	Position																													
Round format	1st	2nd	3rd	4th	5th	6th	7th	8th	9th	10th	11th	12th	13th	14th	15th	16th	17th	18th	19th	20th	21st	22nd	23rd	24th	25th	26th	27th	28th	29th	30th
Four races	75	69	64	60	55	51	48	45	42	39	36	34	33	31	30	28	27	25	24	22	21	19	18	16	15	13	12	10	9	7
Three races	100	92	86	80	74	68	64	60	56	52	48	46	44	42	40	38	36	34	32	30	28	26	24	22	20	18	16	14	12	10
Two races	150	138	129	120	111	102	96	90	84	78	72	69	66	63	60	57	54	51	48	45	42	39	36	33	30	27	24	21	18	15

== Series standings ==
Pos.	Driver	No.	ADE (South Australia)			SYM (Tasmania)				PHI (Victoria (state))				TOW (Queensland)		SMP (New South Wales)				SAN (Victoria (state))		NEW (New South Wales)		Pen.	Points
1	(Australia) Todd Hazelwood	35	2	2	1	2	2	1	3	5	5	7	4	1	1	7	9	2	8	3	7	1	1	0	1808
2	(Australia) Paul Dumbrell	88	1	1	2	1	1	4	2	6	2	4	3	2	15	1	1	4	5	1	3	8	13	0	1713
3	(Australia) Jack Le Brocq	28	3	3	3	4	3	2	1	2	1	1	19	5	13	4	6	6	Ret	2	1	4	Ret	35	1481
4	(Australia) Anton de Pasquale	67	Ret	13	9	6	8	20	10	4	4	2	1	6	2	2	2	1	4	4	16	Ret	5	0	1322
5	(Australia) Shae Davies	26	5	Ret	12	5	4	3	14	3	3	3	2	9	7	9	7	18	Ret	8	17	3	11	15	1216
6	(Australia) Garry Jacobson	1	11	7	7	10	17	7	5	1	Ret	8	5	4	Ret	5	3	5	3	18	20	2	17	0	1166
7	(Australia) Macauley Jones	14	4	4	4	12	Ret	DNS	DNS	9	8	10	9	7	12	6	5	8	2	9	19	17	2	0	1154
8	(Australia) Kurt Kostecki	55	17	10	Ret	9	7	9	15	Ret	11	9	7	11	4	10	14	10	16	7	4	15	6	0	1083
9	(Australia) Will Brown	38	10	6	6	3	5	8	20	7	6	6	6	10	Ret	12	13	9	6	5	11	6	Ret	0	1078
10	(Australia) Richard Muscat	44	6	Ret	Ret	20	10	6	12	8	7	5	8	3	17	11	8	7	20	6	Ret	11	4	0	1038
11	(Australia) Bryce Fullwood	16	8	12	8	17	Ret	DNS	DNS	18	10	21	15	15	3	13	10	13	7	21	2	5	3	35	1035
12	(Australia) Andrew Jones	8	7	5	5	11	14	10	6	17	14	13	12	Ret	Ret	8	15	12	12	10	12	10	9	0	946
13	(Australia) Nathan Morcom	54	16	11	13	13	9	11	7	11	12	14	16	16	Ret	17	22	15	18	20	9	9	8	0	876
14	(Australia) Jack Perkins	4	9	8	17	7	6	5	4	Ret	17	Ret	13	8	5	DNS	DNS	DNS	DNS	Ret	5	Ret	18	0	789
15	(Australia) Brodie Kostecki	57	DNS	16	Ret	16	13	13	8	19	15	12	11	14	Ret	16	11	19	14	16	13	7	7	0	781
16	(Australia) Matt Chahda	18	12	17	15	18	12	18	18	20	18	19	17	17	11	21	Ret	DNS	15	11	15	12	14	35	735
17	(Australia) Mason Barbera	99	13	9	11	Ret	Ret	15	13	14	16	18	18	21	8	Ret	18	16	10	17	10	Ret	15	35	706
18	(Australia) Adam Marjoram	15	18	Ret	DNS	Ret	11	16	11	Ret	19	16	14	12	6	20	20	17	11	12	21	13	Ret	0	675
19	(Australia) Josh Kean	5	20	18	Ret	8	Ret	12	19	10	21	15	10	Ret	Ret	14	19	Ret	9	15	6	14	Ret	0	623
20	(Australia) Matt Palmer	48	19	19	18	19	15	17	17	15	Ret	22	21	22	10	Ret	21	20	19	Ret	14	18	16	0	607
21	(Australia) Jack Smith	21	15	Ret	16	15	Ret	DNS	DNS	12	13	17	22	19	14	15	12	14	13	19	18	Ret	12	0	605
22	(Australia) Jake Kostecki	56	Ret	14	10	14	Ret	14	9	13	9	11	23	13	Ret	18	16	11	21	14	Ret			0	564
23	(Australia) Renee Gracie	98	14	15	14	Ret	16	19	16	16	20	20	20	18	9	19	17	21	17					0	534
24	(Australia) Jordan Boys	98																		13	8	16	7	0	309
25	(New Zealand) Richie Stanaway	6														3	4	3	1					0	263
26	(Australia) Gerard McLeod	50												20	16									0	102
Pos.	Driver	No.	ADE (South Australia)			SYM (Tasmania)				PHI (Victoria (state))				TOW (Queensland)		SMP (New South Wales)				SAN (Victoria (state))		NEW (New South Wales)		Pen.	Points

== See also ==
- 2017 Supercars Championship
