= 2019 Super2 Series =

Australian automotive racing competition

The 2019 Super2 Series was an Australian motor racing competition for Supercars, a support series to the 2019 Supercars Championship. It was the twentieth running of the Supercars Development Series, the second tier of competition in Supercars racing. The series was promoted as the 2019 Dunlop Super2 Series.

Bryce Fullwood won the series with one round to spare in the MW Motorsport prepared Nissan Altima L33

== Entries ==
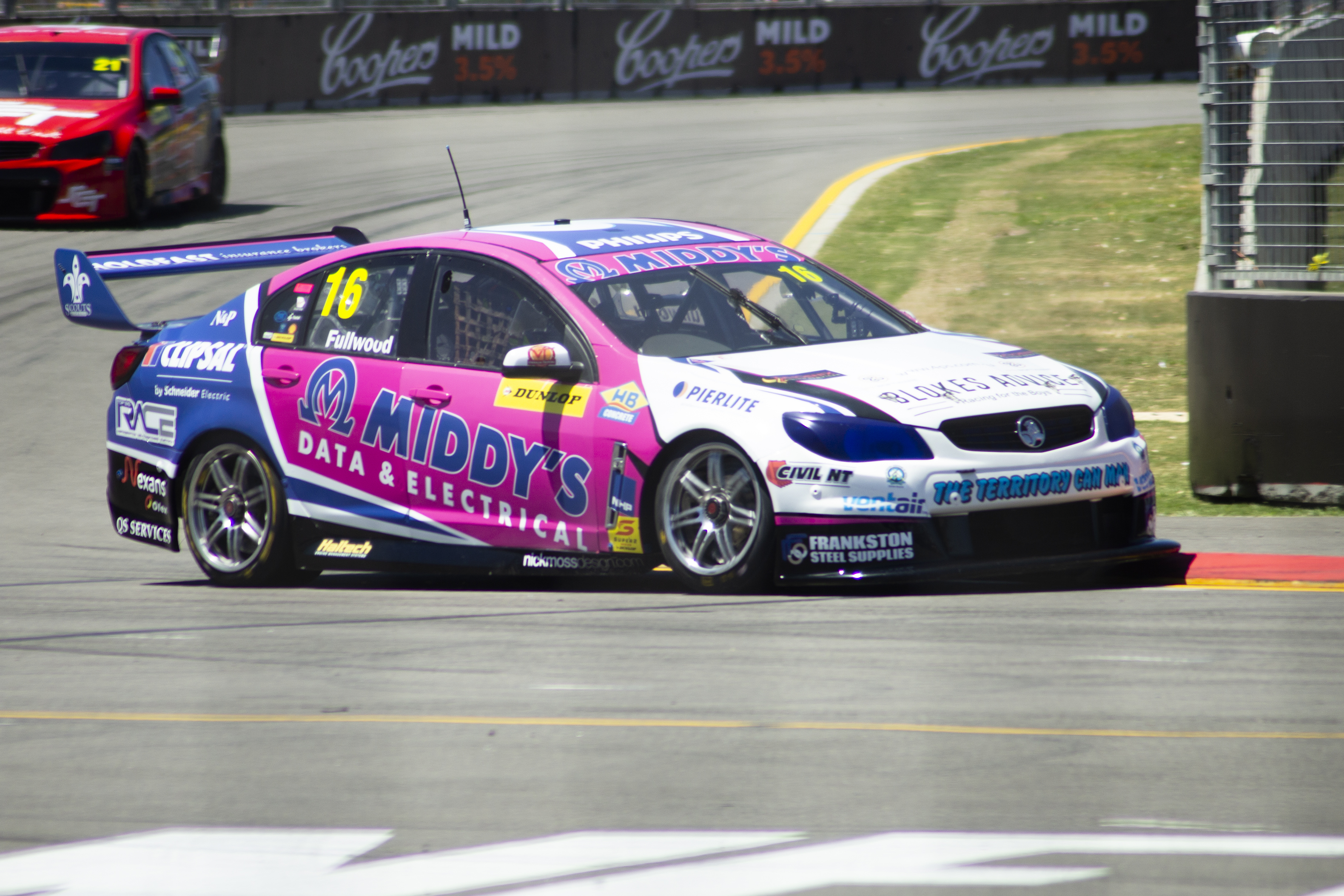
Bryce Fullwood (pictured in 2018) won the 2019 Dunlop Super2 Series

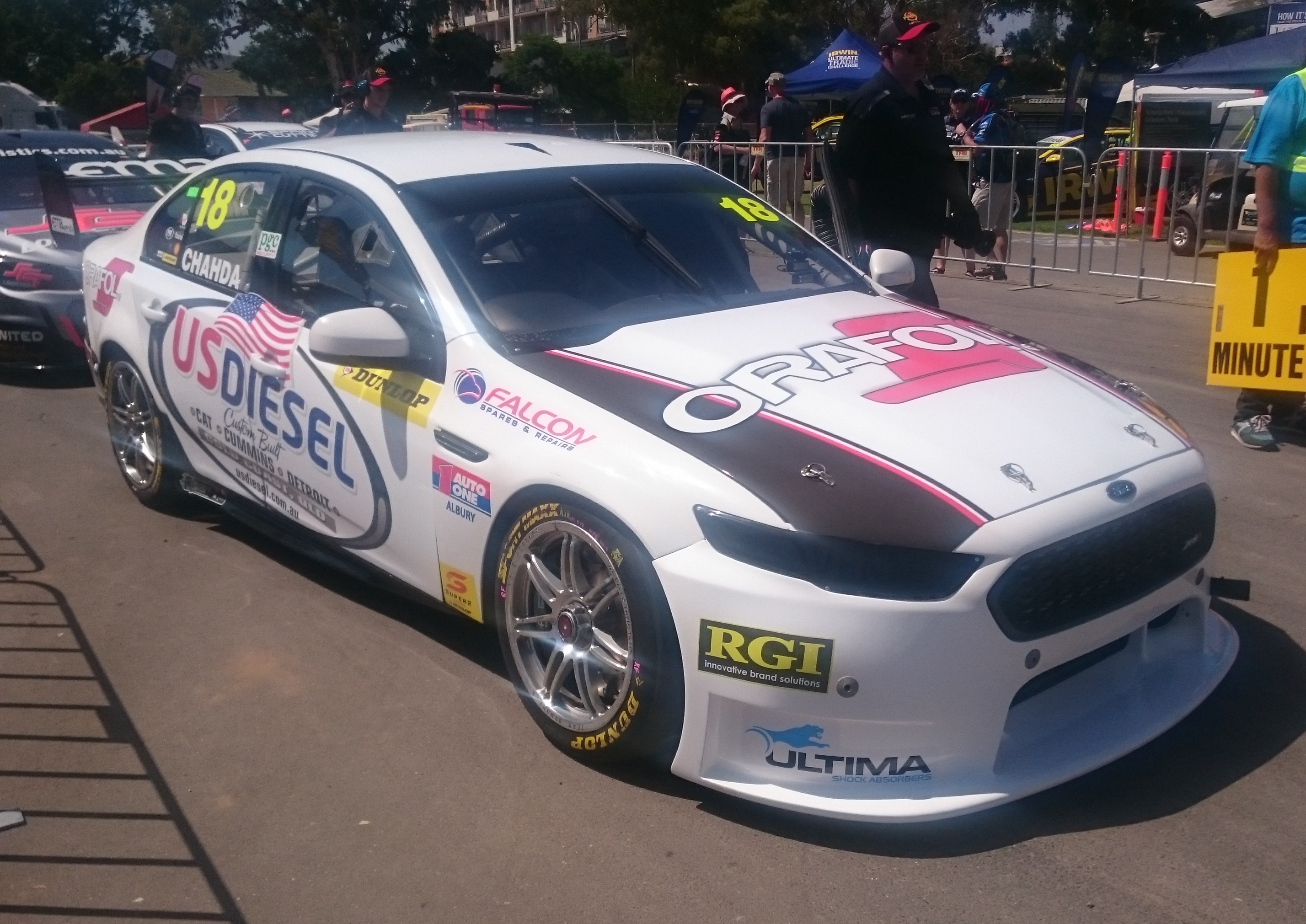
Matt Chahda placed 15th driving a Ford Falcon FG X

The following teams and drivers competed in the 2019 series:

Manufacturer	Model	Team	Driver details		
Manufacturer	Model	Team	No.	Driver	Rounds
Ford	FG X Falcon	Tickford Racing	5	(Australia) Thomas Randle	All
Ford	FG X Falcon	Matt Chahda Motorsport	18	(Australia) Matt Chahda	All
Ford	FG X Falcon	Matt Stone Racing	47	(Australia) Joel Heinrich	1–2
Holden	Commodore VF	Triple Eight Race Engineering	10	(Australia) Brenton Grove	All
Holden	Commodore VF	Triple Eight Race Engineering	55	(Australia) Kurt Kostecki	All
Holden	Commodore VF	Image Racing	15	(Australia) Adam Marjoram	All
Holden	Commodore VF	Image Racing	49	(Australia) Jordan Boys	All
Holden	Commodore VF	Brad Jones Racing	21	(Australia) Jack Smith	All
Holden	Commodore VF	Brad Jones Racing	77	(Australia) Tim Blanchard	3
Holden	Commodore VF	Matt Stone Racing	33	(United Kingdom) Abbie Eaton	1
Holden	Commodore VF	Matt Stone Racing	33	(Australia) David Russell	5
Holden	Commodore VF	Matt Stone Racing	35	(Australia) Ashley Walsh	All
Holden	Commodore VF	Eggleston Motorsport	38	(Australia) Will Brown	All
Holden	Commodore VF	Eggleston Motorsport	54	(Australia) Dean Fiore	1–2
Holden	Commodore VF	Eggleston Motorsport	54	(Australia) Jack Perkins	3–7
Holden	Commodore VF	Eggleston Motorsport	88	(Australia) Justin Ruggier	All
Holden	Commodore VF	Garry Rogers Motorsport	44	(Australia) Dylan O'Keeffe	All
Holden	Commodore VF	Garry Rogers Motorsport	99	(Australia) Mason Barbera	1–4
Holden	Commodore VF	Kostecki Brothers Racing	56	(Australia) Jake Kostecki	1–4
Holden	Commodore VF	Kostecki Brothers Racing	57	(Australia) Brodie Kostecki	1–2
Nissan	Altima L33	MW Motorsport	16	(Australia) Bryce Fullwood	All
Nissan	Altima L33	MW Motorsport	27	(Australia) Tyler Everingham	All
Nissan	Altima L33	MW Motorsport	28	(Australia) Zane Goddard	All

=== Team changes ===
- Brad Jones Racing scaled back to a single-car team, after having previously run three cars.
- Image Racing formed a partnership with Erebus Motorsport, expanding to a two-car operation.
- Kali Motorsport withdrew from the series citing a lack of sponsorship, but retained its entry and cars with a view to re-joining the series in the future.
- Matt Chahda Motorsport switched from running a Holden VF Commodore to a Ford FG X Falcon.
- Paul Morris Motorsport withdrew from the series to focus on its Super3 Series entry.
- Triple Eight Race Engineering returned to the Super2 series for the first time since 2013, entering two VF Commodores.

=== Driver changes ===
- Paul Dumbrell retired from the Super2 Series at the end of 2018.
- The Grand Tour test driver Abbie Eaton made her Super2 début with Matt Stone Racing.
- Reigning Super3 Series champion Tyler Everingham graduated to the Super2 Series with MW Motorsport.
- Dean Fiore moved to Eggleston Motorsport on a 2 round deal, replacing Nathan Morcom.
- Bryce Fullwood returned to MW Motorsport after racing with Matt Stone Racing in 2018.
- Zane Goddard left Brad Jones Racing and joined MW Motorsport.
- Kurt Kostecki and Brenton Grove left Kostecki Brothers Racing and Grove Racing respectively to join Triple Eight Race Engineering.
- 2018 Aussie Racing Cars champion Joel Heinrich made his Super2 début with Matt Stone Racing.
- Garry Jacobson and Macauley Jones left the series as they graduated to the Supercars Championship, with Kelly Racing and Tim Blanchard Racing respectively.
- Porsche Carrera Cup driver Dylan O'Keeffe made his Super2 début with Garry Rogers Motorsport, replacing 2018 champion Chris Pither.
- Aussie Racing Cars race winner Justin Ruggier made his Super2 début with Eggleston Motorsport.
- Ashley Walsh returned to the series for the first time since 2014, driving for Matt Stone Racing.

=== Mid-season changes ===
- Abbie Eaton withdrew from the series following the Adelaide round due to sponsorship issues.
- Joel Heinrich withdrew from the series following the Barbagallo round due to sponsorship issues.
- Brodie Kostecki withdrew from the series following the Barbagallo round to focus on his, and Kostecki Brothers Racing's Enduro Cup début.
- Tim Blanchard made a one-off appearance for Brad Jones Racing in Townsville in preparation for the Enduro Cup.
- Mason Barbera withdrew from the series following the Queensland round due to sponsorship issues.
- Jake Kostecki withdrew from the series following the Queensland round to focus on his, and Kostecki Brothers Racing's Enduro Cup début.
- David Russell made a one-off appearance for Matt Stone Racing at the Bathurst Round.
- Jack Perkins withdrew from the Bathurst round due to illness.

== Calendar ==
The calendar for the 2019 series consisted of seven rounds:

Round	Event name	Circuit	Location	Date
1	Adelaide 500	(South Australia) Adelaide Street Circuit	Adelaide, South Australia	1–3 March
2	Perth SuperSprint	(Western Australia) Barbagallo Raceway	Neerabup, Western Australia	3–4 May
3	Townsville 400	(Queensland) Townsville Street Circuit	Townsville, Queensland	6–7 July
4	Ipswich SuperSprint	Queensland Raceway	Ipswich, Queensland	27–28 July
5	Bathurst 1000	(New South Wales) Mount Panorama Circuit	Bathurst, New South Wales	12 October
6	Sandown 500	(Victoria (state)) Sandown Raceway	Springvale, Victoria	9–10 November
7	Newcastle 500	(New South Wales) Newcastle Street Circuit	Newcastle, New South Wales	23–24 November

=== Calendar changes ===
- The category returned to Queensland Raceway for the first time since 2015. The Symmons Plains round was removed from the schedule.

== Results and standings ==
=== Season summary ===
Round		Event	Pole position	Fastest lap	Winning driver	Winning team	Round winner
1	1	Adelaide 500	(Australia) Mason Barbera	(Australia) Brodie Kostecki	(Australia) Bryce Fullwood	MW Motorsport	(Australia) Bryce Fullwood
1	2	Adelaide 500	(Australia) Bryce Fullwood	(Australia) Bryce Fullwood	(Australia) Brodie Kostecki	Kostecki Brothers Racing	(Australia) Bryce Fullwood
1	3	Adelaide 500	(Australia) Brodie Kostecki	(Australia) Bryce Fullwood	(Australia) Bryce Fullwood	MW Motorsport	(Australia) Bryce Fullwood
2	4	Perth SuperNight	(Australia) Zane Goddard	(Australia) Zane Goddard	(Australia) Will Brown	Eggleston Motorsport	(Australia) Ashley Walsh
2	5	Perth SuperNight	(Australia) Zane Goddard	(Australia) Bryce Fullwood	(Australia) Ashley Walsh	Matt Stone Racing	(Australia) Ashley Walsh
3	6	Townsville 400	(Australia) Kurt Kostecki	(Australia) Kurt Kostecki	(Australia) Bryce Fullwood	MW Motorsport	(Australia) Bryce Fullwood
3	7	Townsville 400	(Australia) Jake Kostecki	(Australia) Bryce Fullwood	(Australia) Bryce Fullwood	MW Motorsport	(Australia) Bryce Fullwood
4	8	Ipswich SuperSprint	(Australia) Thomas Randle	(Australia) Thomas Randle	(Australia) Thomas Randle	Tickford Racing	(Australia) Bryce Fullwood
4	9	Ipswich SuperSprint	(Australia) Kurt Kostecki	(Australia) Thomas Randle	(Australia) Bryce Fullwood	MW Motorsport	(Australia) Bryce Fullwood
5	10	Bathurst 1000	(Australia) Bryce Fullwood	(Australia) Bryce Fullwood	(Australia) Thomas Randle	Tickford Racing	(Australia) Thomas Randle
6	11	Sandown 500	(Australia) Bryce Fullwood	(Australia) Jordan Boys	(Australia) Tyler Everingham	MW Motorsport	(Australia) Jack Perkins
6	12	Sandown 500	(Australia) Jordan Boys	(Australia) Will Brown	(Australia) Jordan Boys	Image Racing	(Australia) Jack Perkins
7	13	Newcastle 500	(Australia) Thomas Randle	(Australia) Bryce Fullwood	(Australia) Bryce Fullwood	MW Motorsport	(Australia) Bryce Fullwood
7	14	Newcastle 500	(Australia) Bryce Fullwood	(Australia) Jordan Boys	(Australia) Jordan Boys	Image Racing	(Australia) Bryce Fullwood

=== Points system ===
Points were awarded in each race as follows.

Round format	Position																													
Round format	1st	2nd	3rd	4th	5th	6th	7th	8th	9th	10th	11th	12th	13th	14th	15th	16th	17th	18th	19th	20th	21st	22nd	23rd	24th	25th	26th	27th	28th	29th	30th
Three races	100	92	86	80	74	68	64	60	56	52	48	46	44	42	40	38	36	34	32	30	28	26	24	22	20	18	16	14	12	10
Two races	150	138	129	120	111	102	96	90	84	78	72	69	66	63	60	57	54	51	48	45	42	39	36	33	30	27	24	21	18	15
One race	300	276	258	240	222	204	192	180	168	156	144	138	132	126	120	114	108	102	96	90	84	78	72	66	60	54	48	42	36	30

=== Series standings ===
Pos.	Driver	No.	ADE (South Australia)			BAR (Western Australia)		TOW (Queensland)		QLD (Queensland)		BAT (New South Wales)	SAN (Victoria (state))		NEW (New South Wales)		Pen.	Points
1	(Australia) Bryce Fullwood	16	1	2	1	4	2	1	1	2	1	2	6	4	1	2	0	1924
2	(Australia) Kurt Kostecki	55	Ret	DSQ	10	6	3	2	4	3	3	3	2	5	5	4	35	1502
3	(Australia) Thomas Randle	5	Ret	9	4	5	7	13	15	1	2	1	11	Ret	2	3	0	1396
4	(Australia) Zane Goddard	28	2	3	3	2	9	4	5	11	13	10	8	13	10	6	0	1347
5	(Australia) Dylan O'Keeffe	44	9	8	11	10	15	12	14	9	5	6	3	Ret	7	9	0	1142
6	(Australia) Tyler Everingham	27	DNS	Ret	15	15	12	8	11	7	8	5	1	9	13	11	0	1111
7	(Australia) Jordan Boys	49	Ret	11	20	9	11	Ret	Ret	16	9	7	13	1	3	1	0	1062
8	(Australia) Brenton Grove	10	10	DSQ	13	13	16	5	2	Ret	10	4	Ret	6	9	8	0	1062
9	(Australia) Ashley Walsh	35	6	5	16	3	1	Ret	12	10	14	Ret	10	7	4	7	0	1059
10	(Australia) Jack Smith	21	8	13	17	11	17	7	10	8	12	12	9	12	14	12	0	1022
11	(Australia) Justin Ruggier	88	11	12	12	14	13	11	16	14	11	11	7	8	12	10	0	1010
12	(Australia) Will Brown	38	Ret	10	5	1	8	Ret	9	6	16	Ret	4	3	6	Ret	0	960
13	(Australia) Adam Marjoram	15	7	6	9	Ret	10	6	6	12	4	Ret	12	11	8	Ret	0	890
14	(Australia) Jack Perkins	54						10	8	5	15	WD	5	2	15	5	0	759
15	(Australia) Matt Chahda	18	13	14	14	17	19	9	Ret	15	Ret	9	14	10	11	Ret	0	755
16	(Australia) Jake Kostecki	56	5	7	6	7	6	Ret	7	4	6						0	722
17	(Australia) Mason Barbera	99	3	4	7	12	14	Ret	13	13	7						0	590
18	(Australia) Brodie Kostecki	57	4	1	2	18	5										0	434
19	(Australia) Dean Fiore	54	Ret	15	8	8	4										0	310
20	(Australia) Tim Blanchard	77						3	3								0	258
21	(Australia) Joel Heinrich	47	12	16	19	16	18										0	224
22	(Australia) David Russell	33										8					0	180
23	(United Kingdom) Abbie Eaton	33	14	Ret	18												0	76
Pos.	Driver	No.	ADE (South Australia)			BAR (Western Australia)		TOW (Queensland)		QLD (Queensland)		BAT (New South Wales)	SAN (Victoria (state))		NEW (New South Wales)		Pen.	Points
