= Eggleston Motorsport =

- Manufacturer: Holden; Mercedes-AMG
- Team Principal: Ben Eggleston; Rachael Wagg
- Race Drivers: Super2: 1. Zach Bates; 36. Cody Burcher; 38. Elliott Cleary; 54. Jordyn Sinni; 88. Bradi Owen
- Race Engineers: Super2: 1. Stuart McDonald; 36. Steve Robinson; 38. Chris Pither; 54. Dan Kroehn; 88. Justin Ruggier
- Chassis: Super2: Holden ZB Commodore; Australian GT: Mercedes-AMG GT3; Super3: VE Commodore
- Debut: Super2: 2006
- Drivers' Championships: Super 2: 1 Kumho Tyre Series: 2
- Round wins: 2
- 2020 position: 1
- 8th (Brodie Kostecki)

Eggleston Motorsport is an Australian motor racing team which is currently competing in the Dunlop Super2 Series, Dunlop Super3 Series and the Australian GT Championship. The team's current Super2 drivers are Cody Burcher, Elliott Cleary, Bayley Hall and Bradi Owen.

EMS was born out of Eggleston Motorsport & Service Centre. The motorsport division is now the primary driver for the operation. EMS has been a key competitor in the Dunlop Series since 2010. Team co-owner Rachael Wagg said in December 2014 that the team was interested in a wildcard V8 Supercar entry or even an endurance campaign, though was not currently considering stepping into the main series in the near future.

== Super 2 Series. ==
Originally started to further the driving career of owner Ben Eggleston, EMS entered select rounds of the 2006 Fujitsu V8 Supercar Series with a former Team Dynamik VX Commodore. Eggleston had a modest year, and would go on to finish 34th in the standings.

After taking a years hiatus the team would return for the 2008 Fujitsu series with a full time effort for Ben Eggleston, the team would also enter a second car at select rounds for Taz Douglas & Simon Wills. Eggleston would again have a modest year, finishing 24th overall. The second car would have a similar season, with Douglas and Wills not reaching the top 10 in either of their stints in the car.

For 2009 the team would scale back to a single car, part time entry for Ben Eggleston. Eggleston would begin the season in an older spec VZ before switching to a newer VE for the final round. Despite only entering 4 rounds, Eggleston would have his best season in the second tier supercars series, finishing 15th, achieving his best race result of 7th along the way.

In 2010 the team would expand, running a slew of drivers part time across 3 cars. Cameron McConville, Craig Baird, & David Reynolds would enter a single round alongside Eggleston himself, while Nick Percat would compete in the final 3 rounds of the series for the team. Percat would achieve the team's first 3 podiums during his stint with EMS on his way to 4th in the final standings. McConville would win the team's first race at the Winton round, with Reynolds also achieving a podium at the Townsville event.

The team would again enter a variety of drivers part time in 2011. Cameron McConville would enter 2 rounds and achieve a best race result of 4th. Debutants Gavin Bullas & Lindsay Yelland would enter a round each for the team. EMS would further scale back their involvement in the 2012 Fujitsu V8 Supercar Series. Ben Eggleston would enter only a single round.

The team would expand for the 2013 season, entering one full time car, driven by Jay Verdnick for round one, and Jack Perkins for the rest of the season. A second car would be entered for the majority of the season, with Daniel Gaunt entered for rounds 1 through 4, and Ant Pederson for round 5. Perkins would score 2 wins and 6 other podiums on the season on his way to 4th in the standings, matching the team's previous best. Gaunt would also score 3 podiums for the team.

2014 was a breakout season for the team. Expanding to 3 full-time cars for the first time ever, the team would take on Triple Eight Race Engineering endurance driver and former series champion, Paul Dumbrell. Alongside Dumbrell would Garry Jacobson and Ant Pederson. Dumbrell would win 6 races on his way to the title, taking 3 other podiums. Jacobson would score a single podium, finishing 11th overall, with Pederson finishing 10th.

EMS would again enter Dumbrell & Jacobson in 2015, alongside Pederson for rounds 1 through 6. The team would also enter a 4th car for Debutant, & 2015 Kumho Series winner Liam McAdam for round 6, with McAdam replacing Pederson for round 7. Dumbrell would win 5 races, and take 7 other podiums but would fall just short of the championship, finishing second. Jacobson would secure 2 more podiums on his way to 6th in the championship. Pederson would have more modest results, but still finish 13th in the championship despite missing a round. McAdam would famously crash during qualifying for the Sydney round of the series, almost rolling his car before slamming heavily into the tyre barrier.

For 2016 the team would enter 2 cars full time. A slew of drivers would share time in 2 of the team's cars, with McAdam & Taz Douglas sharing the No. 38. Taz Douglas would drive the No. 54 when not driving the 28, he would pair up with Grant Denyer for the Bathurst 250. Dumbrell would contest rounds 1 through 6 with the team, before withdrawing from the final round due to illness. Dumbrell would finish 7th in the championship standings, only taking 3 wins. Douglas would finish 5th overall, taking one podium for the team.

The team would again expand to 3 full time cars in the 2017 Super 2 Series, with the purchase of several exTriple Eight Race Engineering VF Commodores. Paul Dumbrell would remain with the team, joined by debutants Will Brown and Nathan Morcom. Dumbrell would win 7 races during a season long battle with eventual series winner Todd Hazelwood, Dumbrell would finish runner up. Brown would secure one podium on his way to 9th in the series, with Morcom taking a best race result of 7th, finishing 13th overall.

For 2018 the team would retain Dumbrell, Brown, and Morcom, as well as adding a 4th car for rookie Dominic Storey. Dumbrell would win 5 races and take 6 second place finishes, again finishing runner up in the series. Brown would improve, taking 2 podiums to finish 6th overall. Morcom & Storey would struggle, finishing 19th and 15th respectively.

EMS would shake up their roster for 2019, With Will Brown retaining his seat, being joined by Dean Fiore and later Jack Perkins, as well as rookie Justin Ruggier. Brown would win his first race, however would place lower than his previous attempt, finishing 9th. Perkins would take a 2nd at the Sandown round on his way to 14th in the championship despite missing the first 2 rounds. Ruggier would finish 11th.

The team would again switch up their drivers for the shortened 2020 Super 2 Series, entering Jack Perkins & Brodie Kostecki. Kostecki would take pole and the first two race wins as well as the round at the 2020 Adelaide 500, before having car issues at Sydney that would see him finish 9th and 3rd respectively for the 2 races. Perkins would have 2 retirements at Adelaide and finish solidly at Sydney. Ultimately the team would miss the season finale at Bathurst, as well as a shot at the championship due to the ongoing 2020 Coronavirus Pandemic, being unable to quarantine their largely contractor based staff.

For 2021 the team will continue running both of their ex-Triple Eight Commodores driven by Super3 graduate Jack Sipp and two time Australian Karting Champion Matt McLean plus the team has also signed Bradley Neil to drive an ex-Holden Racing Team VF Commodore which was purchased from Anderson Motorsport which was driven by Tyler Everingham before being sold on to Neil. Neil had to suspend his 2021 campaign due to his battle with cancer after just one round due to the return of Non-Hodgkin Lymphoma. He was replaced by Jack Perkins who competed for the team for the 2020 season.

== GT Racing ==
For the 2012 Australian GT Championship the team debuted a pair of Aston Martin DBRS9's for Martin Wagg and Ben Eggleston. Eggleston had the better season, taking two podiums on his way to 6th in the championship. Wagg would struggle, finishing 15th.

The team returned to GT Racing in 2016, running a Mercedes-AMG GT3 for Dominic Storey in the 2016 Australian Endurance Championship. Storey finished 2nd in the series, behind the combination of Nathan Morcom and Grant Denyer. He would take 1 podium and 2 fastest laps on the season. EMS would enter Tony Bates in the 2017 Australian GT Championship for rounds 1 through 4. Bates won round 1, with 2 races wins, he went on to finish 8th in the series despite missing the final round. Storey returned to the team in 2018, running alongside Peter Hackett in the No. 63 AMG GT3 for round 1, Jake Fouracre would enter the other endurance races with Hackett. He finished runner up in the series to Fraser Ross. Yasser Shahin had his AMG prepared and run by the team for select rounds as well, partnered with Luke Youlden for the endurance races. Hackett remained with the team for the 2019 Australian GT Championship, again partnering with Storey for the endurance races. He again finished runner up in the series, this time to Geoff Emery.

== Kumho Tyre Series ==
Eggleston Motorsport first entered the 3rd Tier Supercars Championship, then known as the Shannon's V8 Touring Car National Series in 2009. Ben Eggleston would drive the team's VX Commodore that would go on to compete in the 2009 Fujitsu Series in 1 round. He would finish on the podium in his debut race. For 2010 Eggleston would enter another single round, taking 2 podiums.

The team would take a 4 year hiatus from the series before returning in 2014 to run Justin Ruggier full time. Ruggier would win the series, taking 5 race wins along the way. Cameron McConville would enter the 4th round at Phillip Island for the team, taking 2 race wins.

The team would become back to back champions in 2015 with Liam McAdam winning the series, he would win 8 races on his way to the title. Jack Perkins would be entered for the first round at Sandown, he would sweep the round, taking all 3 race wins, pole positions, and fastest laps.

Six Years after they won their last championship they came back to the championship and signed Steven Page to drive his own Holden VE Commodore for the 2021 Super3 Series.

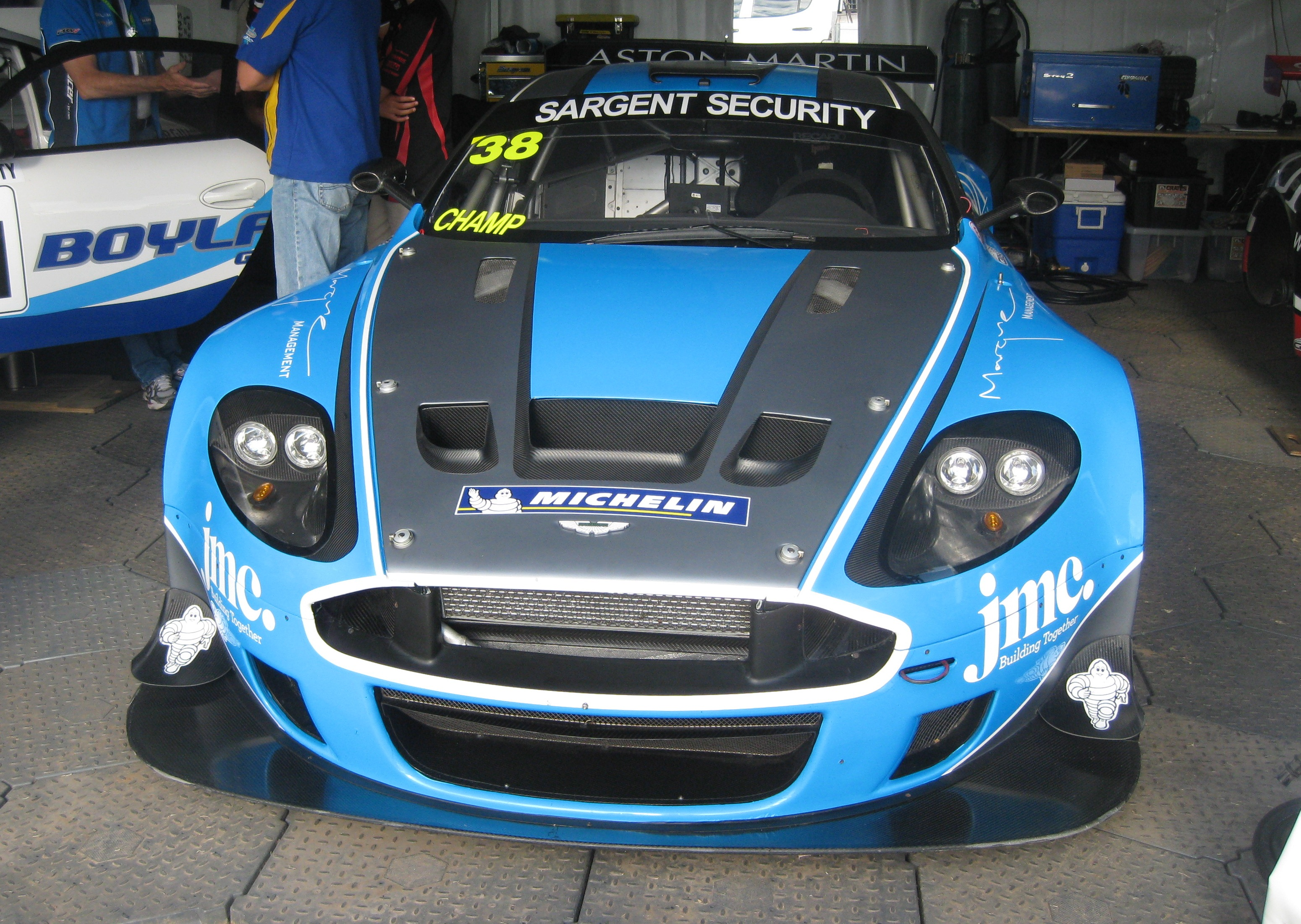
Ben Eggleston placed sixth in the 2012 Australian GT Championship driving an Aston Martin DBRS9 for Eggleston Motorsport

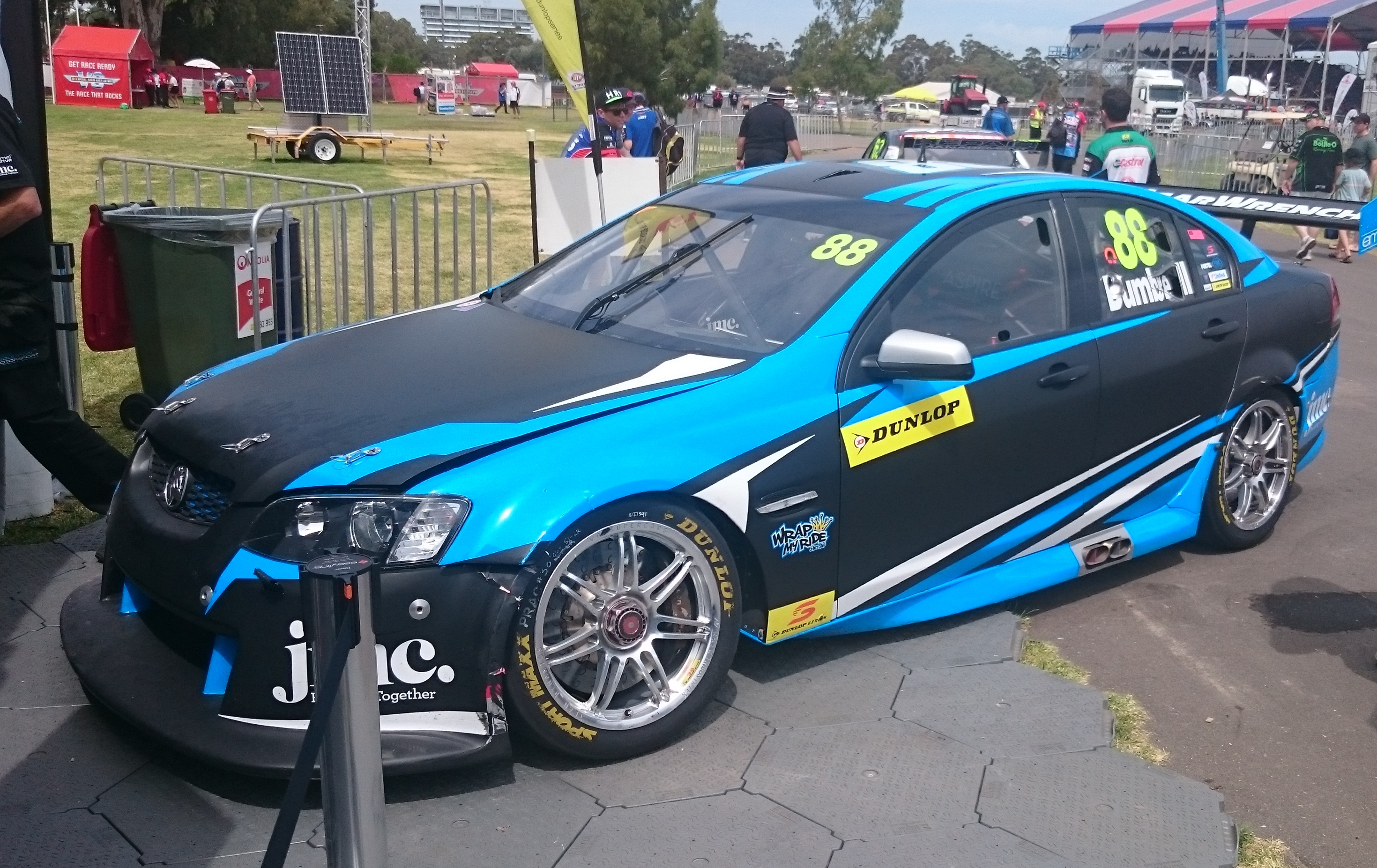
Paul Dumbrell placed seventh in the 2016 Dunlop Series driving a Holden VE Commodore for Eggleston Motorsport

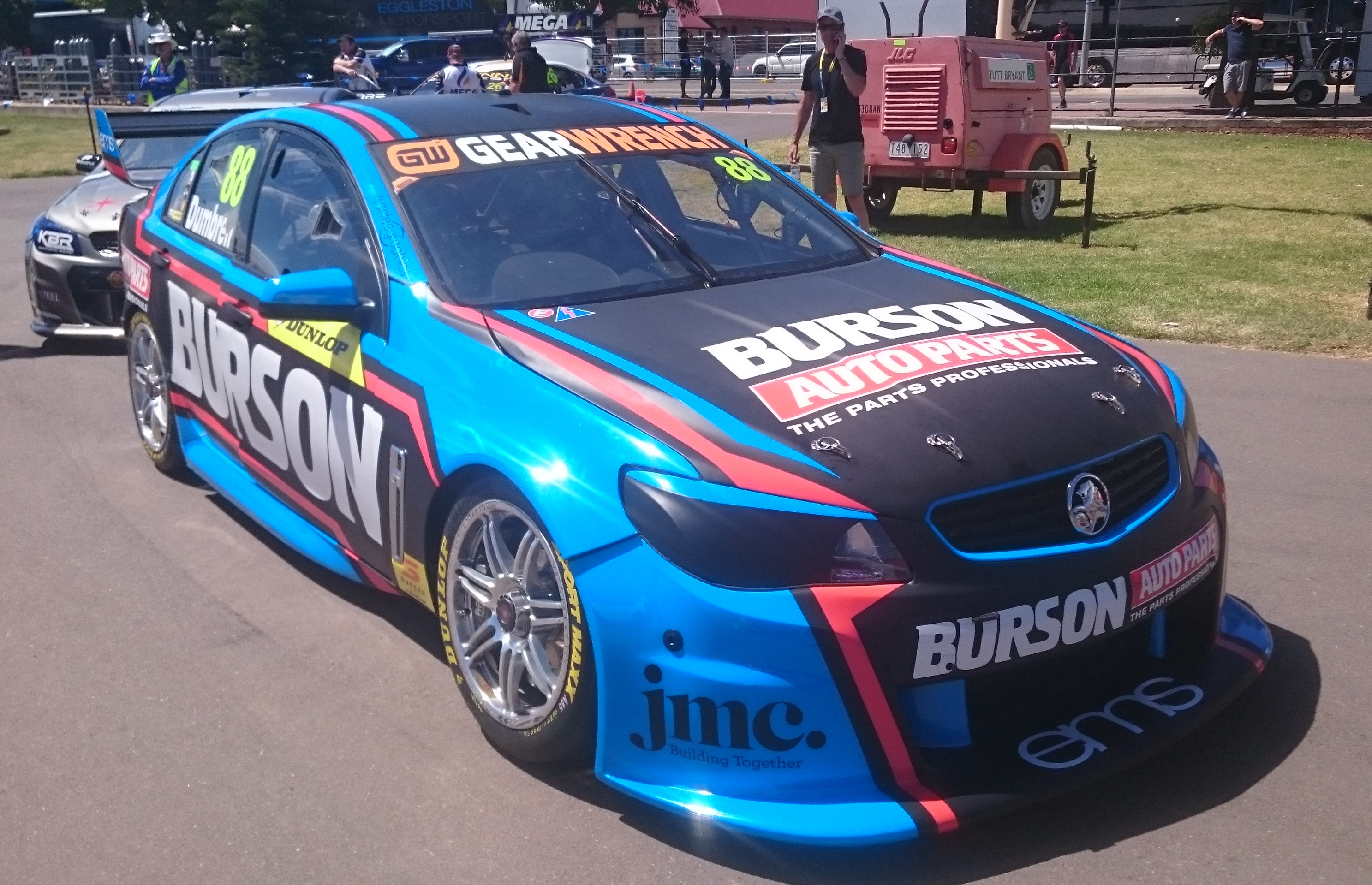
Paul Dumbrell placed second in the 2018 Dunlop Super2 Series driving a Holden VF Commodore for Eggleston Motorsport

== Super2 drivers ==
The following is a list of drivers who have driven for the team in the Super2 Series, in order of first appearance. Drivers who only drove for the team on a part-time basis are listed in italics

- (Australia) Ben Eggleston (2006, 2008–2010, 2012)
- (Australia) Taz Douglas (2008, 2016)
- (New Zealand) Simon Wills (2008)
- (New Zealand) Craig Baird (2010)
- (Australia) Cameron McConville (2010–2011)
- (Australia) David Reynolds (2010)
- (Australia) Nick Percat (2010)
- (Australia) Gavin Bullas (2011)
- (Australia) Lindsay Yelland (2011)
- (New Zealand) Daniel Gaunt (2013)
- (New Zealand) Ant Pedersen (2013–2015)
- (Australia) Jay Verdnik (2013)
- (Australia) Jack Perkins (2013, 2019–2021)
- (Australia) Garry Jacobson (2014-2015)
- (Australia) Paul Dumbrell (2014–2018)
- (Australia) Liam McAdam (2015–2016)
- (Australia) Grant Denyer (2016)
- (Australia) Will Brown (2017–2019)
- (Australia) Nathan Morcom (2017-2018)
- (New Zealand) Dominic Storey (2018)
- (Australia) Dean Fiore (2019)
- (Australia) Justin Ruggier (2019)
- (Australia) Brodie Kostecki (2020)
- (Australia) Bradley Neil (2021)
- (Australia) Jack Sipp (2021)
- (Australia) Matt McLean (2021–2022)
- (Australia) Tim Blanchard (2021)
- (Australia) Tony D'Alberto (2021)
- (Australia) Josh Fife (2021)
- (Australia) Cameron Crick (2022–2024)
- (Australia) Kai Allen (2022-2024)
- (Australia) Jordyn Sinni (2023–2025)
- (Australia) Cooper Murray (2023-2024)
- (Australia) Jonathon Webb (2024)
- (Australia) Thomas Maxwell (2024)
- (Australia) Bradi Owen (2025–present)
- (Australia) Cody Burcher (2025–present)
- (Australia) Zach Bates (2025)
- (Australia) Elliott Cleary (2025–present)
- (Australia) Bayley Hall (2026–present)
- (Australia) Aaron Love (2026)

== Super2 Results ==
=== Car No. 26 results ===
Year	Driver	No.	Make	1	2	3	4	5	6	7	8	9	10	11	12	13	14	15	16	17	18	19	20	21	22	23	24	25	26	27	28	29	30	Position	Pts
2010	David Reynolds	54	Holden VE Commodore	ADE; R1	ADE; R2	QLD; R3	QLD; R4	QLD; R5	WIN; R6	WIN; R7	WIN; R8	TOW; R9; Ret	TOW; R10; 7	TOW; R11; 2	BAT; R12	BAT; R13	SAN; R14	SAN; R15	SAN; R16	HOM; R17	HOM; R18													33rd	148
2011	Lindsay Yelland	54	Holden VZ Commodore	ADE; R1	ADE; R2	BAR; R3	BAR; R4	TOW; R5; DNS	TOW; R6; DNS	TOW; R7; DNS	QLD; R8	QLD; R9	QLD; R10	BAT; R11	BAT; R12	SAN; R13	SAN; R14	SAN; R15	HOM; R16	HOM; R17														40th	0
2013	Jack Perkins	54	Holden VE Commodore	ADE; R1	ADE; R2	BAR; R3; 9	BAR; R4; 1	BAR; R5; 7	TOW; R6; 18	TOW; R7; 10	TOW; R8; 7	QLD; R9; 2	QLD; R10; 7	QLD; R11; 1	WIN; R12; 2	WIN; R13; 8	WIN; R14; 1	BAT; R15; 3	BAT; R16; 3	HOM; R17; 3	HOM; R18; 3													4th	1404
2014	Garry Jacobson	54	Holden VE Commodore	ADE; R1	ADE; R2	WIN; R3	WIN; R4	BAR; R5	BAR; R6	TOW; R7	TOW; R8	QLD; R9	QLD; R10	BAT; R11	HOM; R12	HOM; R13																			
2015	Garry Jacobson	54	Holden VE Commodore	ADE	ADE	BAR	BAR	BAR	WIN	WIN	WIN	TOW	TOW	QLD	QLD	QLD	BAT	HOM	HOM																
2016	Taz Douglas	54	Holden VE Commodore	ADE	ADE	PHI	PHI	PHI	BAR	BAR	BAR	TOW	TOW	SAN	SAN	SAN	BAT	HOM	HOM																
2017	Nathan Morcom	54	Holden VF Commodore	ADE	ADE	ADE	SYM	SYM	SYM	SYM	PHI	PHI	PHI	PHI	TOW	TOW	SMP	SMP	SMP	SMP	SAN	SAN	NEW	NEW											
2018	Nathan Morcom	54	Holden VF Commodore	ADE; R1	ADE; R2	ADE; R3	SYM; R4	SYM; R5	SYM; R6	BAR; R7	BAR; R8	BAR; R9	TOW; R10	TOW; R11	SAN; R12	SAN; R13	BAT; R14	NEW; R15	NEW; R16																
2019	Jack Perkins	54	Holden VF Commodore	ADE; R1	ADE; R2	ADE; R3	BAR; R4	BAR; R5	TOW; R6	TOW; R7	QLD; R8	QLD; R9	BAT; R10	SAN; R11	SAN; R12	NEW; R13	NEW; R14																		
2020	Jack Perkins	54	Holden VF Commodore	ADE; R1	ADE; R2	ADE; R3	SYD; R4	SYD; R5	BAT; R6	BAT; R7																									
2021	Matt McLean	54	Holden VF Commodore	BAT; R1	BAT; R2	TOW1; R3	TOW1; R4	TOW2; R5	TOW2; R6	SMP; R7	SMP; R8	BAT; R9	BAT; R10																						
2022	Matt McLean	54	Holden VF Commodore	SMP; R1	SMP; R2	WAN; R3	WAN; R4	TOW; R5	TOW; R6	SAN; R7	SAN; R8	BAT; R9	BAT; R10	ADE; R11	ADE; R12																				

=== Car No. 38 results ===
Year	Driver	No.	Make	1	2	3	4	5	6	7	8	9	10	11	12	13	14	15	16	17	18	19	20	21	22	23	24	25	26	27	28	29	30	Position	Pts
2010	David Reynolds	54	Holden VE Commodore	ADE; R1	ADE; R2	QLD; R3	QLD; R4	QLD; R5	WIN; R6	WIN; R7	WIN; R8	TOW; R9; Ret	TOW; R10; 7	TOW; R11; 2	BAT; R12	BAT; R13	SAN; R14	SAN; R15	SAN; R16	HOM; R17	HOM; R18													33rd	148
2011	Lindsay Yelland	54	Holden VZ Commodore	ADE; R1	ADE; R2	BAR; R3	BAR; R4	TOW; R5; DNS	TOW; R6; DNS	TOW; R7; DNS	QLD; R8	QLD; R9	QLD; R10	BAT; R11	BAT; R12	SAN; R13	SAN; R14	SAN; R15	HOM; R16	HOM; R17														40th	0
2013	Daniel Gaunt	54	Holden VE Commodore	ADE; R1	ADE; R2	BAR; R3; 9	BAR; R4; 1	BAR; R5; 7	TOW; R6; 18	TOW; R7; 10	TOW; R8; 7	QLD; R9; 2	QLD; R10; 7	QLD; R11; 1	WIN; R12; 2	WIN; R13; 8	WIN; R14; 1	BAT; R15; 3	BAT; R16; 3	HOM; R17; 3	HOM; R18; 3													4th	1404
2014	Ant Pederson	54	Holden VE Commodore	ADE; R1	ADE; R2	WIN; R3	WIN; R4	BAR; R5	BAR; R6	TOW; R7	TOW; R8	QLD; R9	QLD; R10	BAT; R11	HOM; R12	HOM; R13																			
2015	Ant Pederson	54	Holden VE Commodore	ADE	ADE	BAR	BAR	BAR	WIN	WIN	WIN	TOW	TOW	QLD	QLD	QLD	BAT	HOM	HOM																
2016	Liam McAdam	54	Holden VE Commodore	ADE	ADE	PHI	PHI	PHI	BAR	BAR	BAR	TOW	TOW	SAN	SAN	SAN	BAT	HOM	HOM																
2017	Will Brown	54	Holden VF Commodore	ADE	ADE	ADE	SYM	SYM	SYM	SYM	PHI	PHI	PHI	PHI	TOW	TOW	SMP	SMP	SMP	SMP	SAN	SAN	NEW	NEW											
2018	Will Brown	54	Holden VF Commodore	ADE; R1	ADE; R2	ADE; R3	SYM; R4	SYM; R5	SYM; R6	BAR; R7	BAR; R8	BAR; R9	TOW; R10	TOW; R11	SAN; R12	SAN; R13	BAT; R14	NEW; R15	NEW; R16																
2019	Will Brown	54	Holden VF Commodore	ADE; R1	ADE; R2	ADE; R3	BAR; R4	BAR; R5	TOW; R6	TOW; R7	QLD; R8	QLD; R9	BAT; R10	SAN; R11	SAN; R12	NEW; R13	NEW; R14																		
2020	Brodie Kostecki	54	Holden VF Commodore	ADE; R1	ADE; R2	ADE; R3	SYD; R4	SYD; R5	BAT; R6	BAT; R7																									
2021	Jack Sipp	54	Holden VF Commodore	BAT; R1	BAT; R2	TOW1; R3	TOW1; R4	TOW2; R5	TOW2; R6	SMP; R7	SMP; R8	BAT; R9	BAT; R10																						
2022	Cameron Crick	54	Holden VF Commodore	SMP; R1	SMP; R2	WAN; R3	WAN; R4	TOW; R5	TOW; R6	SAN; R7	SAN; R8	BAT; R9	BAT; R10	ADE; R11	ADE; R12																				

=== Car No. 54 results ===
Year	Driver	No.	Make	1	2	3	4	5	6	7	8	9	10	11	12	13	14	15	16	17	18	19	20	21	22	23	24	25	26	27	28	29	30	Position	Pts
2010	David Reynolds	54	Holden VE Commodore	ADE; R1	ADE; R2	QLD; R3	QLD; R4	QLD; R5	WIN; R6	WIN; R7	WIN; R8	TOW; R9; Ret	TOW; R10; 7	TOW; R11; 2	BAT; R12	BAT; R13	SAN; R14	SAN; R15	SAN; R16	HOM; R17	HOM; R18													33rd	148
2011	Lindsay Yelland	54	Holden VZ Commodore	ADE; R1	ADE; R2	BAR; R3	BAR; R4	TOW; R5; DNS	TOW; R6; DNS	TOW; R7; DNS	QLD; R8	QLD; R9	QLD; R10	BAT; R11	BAT; R12	SAN; R13	SAN; R14	SAN; R15	HOM; R16	HOM; R17														40th	0
2013	Jack Perkins	54	Holden VE Commodore	ADE; R1	ADE; R2	BAR; R3; 9	BAR; R4; 1	BAR; R5; 7	TOW; R6; 18	TOW; R7; 10	TOW; R8; 7	QLD; R9; 2	QLD; R10; 7	QLD; R11; 1	WIN; R12; 2	WIN; R13; 8	WIN; R14; 1	BAT; R15; 3	BAT; R16; 3	HOM; R17; 3	HOM; R18; 3													4th	1404
2014	Garry Jacobson	54	Holden VE Commodore	ADE; R1; 10	ADE; R2; 5	WIN; R3; 8	WIN; R4; 3	BAR; R5; 11	BAR; R6; 15	TOW; R7; 15	TOW; R8; 11	QLD; R9; 4	QLD; R10; 6	BAT; R11; Ret	HOM; R12; 21	HOM; R13; Ret																		11th	886
2015	Garry Jacobson	54	Holden VE Commodore	ADE; R1; 5	ADE; R2; 6	BAR; R3; 9	BAR; R4; 8	BAR; R5; 7	WIN; R6; 15	WIN; R7; 10	WIN; R8; 18	TOW; R9; 2	TOW; R10; 9	QLD; R11; 7	QLD; R12; 6	QLD; R13; 8	BAT; R14; 10	HOM; R15; 2	HOM; R16; 15															6th	1287
2016	Taz Douglas	54	Holden VE Commodore	ADE	ADE	PHI	PHI	PHI	BAR	BAR	BAR	TOW	TOW	SAN	SAN	SAN	BAT	HOM	HOM																
2017	Nathan Morcom	54	Holden VF Commodore	ADE	ADE	ADE	SYM	SYM	SYM	SYM	PHI	PHI	PHI	PHI	TOW	TOW	SMP	SMP	SMP	SMP	SAN	SAN	NEW	NEW											
2018	Nathan Morcom	54	Holden VF Commodore	ADE; R1	ADE; R2	ADE; R3	SYM; R4	SYM; R5	SYM; R6	BAR; R7	BAR; R8	BAR; R9	TOW; R10	TOW; R11	SAN; R12	SAN; R13	BAT; R14	NEW; R15	NEW; R16																
2019	Jack Perkins	54	Holden VF Commodore	ADE; R1	ADE; R2	ADE; R3	BAR; R4	BAR; R5	TOW; R6	TOW; R7	QLD; R8	QLD; R9	BAT; R10	SAN; R11	SAN; R12	NEW; R13	NEW; R14																		
2020	Jack Perkins	54	Holden VF Commodore	ADE; R1	ADE; R2	ADE; R3	SYD; R4	SYD; R5	BAT; R6	BAT; R7																									
2021	Matt McLean	54	Holden VF Commodore	BAT; R1	BAT; R2	TOW1; R3	TOW1; R4	TOW2; R5	TOW2; R6	SMP; R7	SMP; R8	BAT; R9	BAT; R10																						
2022	Matt McLean	54	Holden VF Commodore	SMP; R1	SMP; R2	WAN; R3	WAN; R4	TOW; R5	TOW; R6	SAN; R7	SAN; R8	BAT; R9	BAT; R10	ADE; R11	ADE; R12																				

=== Car No. 88 results ===
Year	Driver	No.	Make	1	2	3	4	5	6	7	8	9	10	11	12	13	14	15	16	17	18	19	20	21	22	23	24	25	26	27	28	29	30	Position	Pts
2010	David Reynolds	54	Holden VE Commodore	ADE; R1	ADE; R2	QLD; R3	QLD; R4	QLD; R5	WIN; R6	WIN; R7	WIN; R8	TOW; R9; Ret	TOW; R10; 7	TOW; R11; 2	BAT; R12	BAT; R13	SAN; R14	SAN; R15	SAN; R16	HOM; R17	HOM; R18													33rd	148
2011	Lindsay Yelland	54	Holden VZ Commodore	ADE; R1	ADE; R2	BAR; R3	BAR; R4	TOW; R5; DNS	TOW; R6; DNS	TOW; R7; DNS	QLD; R8	QLD; R9	QLD; R10	BAT; R11	BAT; R12	SAN; R13	SAN; R14	SAN; R15	HOM; R16	HOM; R17														40th	0
2013	Jack Perkins	54	Holden VE Commodore	ADE; R1	ADE; R2	BAR; R3; 9	BAR; R4; 1	BAR; R5; 7	TOW; R6; 18	TOW; R7; 10	TOW; R8; 7	QLD; R9; 2	QLD; R10; 7	QLD; R11; 1	WIN; R12; 2	WIN; R13; 8	WIN; R14; 1	BAT; R15; 3	BAT; R16; 3	HOM; R17; 3	HOM; R18; 3													4th	1404
2014	Garry Jacobson	54	Holden VE Commodore	ADE; R1	ADE; R2	WIN; R3	WIN; R4	BAR; R5	BAR; R6	TOW; R7	TOW; R8	QLD; R9	QLD; R10	BAT; R11	HOM; R12	HOM; R13																			
2015	Garry Jacobson	54	Holden VE Commodore	ADE	ADE	BAR	BAR	BAR	WIN	WIN	WIN	TOW	TOW	QLD	QLD	QLD	BAT	HOM	HOM																
2016	Taz Douglas	54	Holden VE Commodore	ADE	ADE	PHI	PHI	PHI	BAR	BAR	BAR	TOW	TOW	SAN	SAN	SAN	BAT	HOM	HOM																
2017	Nathan Morcom	54	Holden VF Commodore	ADE	ADE	ADE	SYM	SYM	SYM	SYM	PHI	PHI	PHI	PHI	TOW	TOW	SMP	SMP	SMP	SMP	SAN	SAN	NEW	NEW											
2018	Nathan Morcom	54	Holden VF Commodore	ADE; R1	ADE; R2	ADE; R3	SYM; R4	SYM; R5	SYM; R6	BAR; R7	BAR; R8	BAR; R9	TOW; R10	TOW; R11	SAN; R12	SAN; R13	BAT; R14	NEW; R15	NEW; R16																
2019	Jack Perkins	54	Holden VF Commodore	ADE; R1	ADE; R2	ADE; R3	BAR; R4	BAR; R5	TOW; R6	TOW; R7	QLD; R8	QLD; R9	BAT; R10	SAN; R11	SAN; R12	NEW; R13	NEW; R14																		
2020	Jack Perkins	54	Holden VF Commodore	ADE; R1	ADE; R2	ADE; R3	SYD; R4	SYD; R5	BAT; R6	BAT; R7																									
2021	Matt McLean	54	Holden VF Commodore	BAT; R1	BAT; R2	TOW1; R3	TOW1; R4	TOW2; R5	TOW2; R6	SMP; R7	SMP; R8	BAT; R9	BAT; R10																						
2022	Matt McLean	54	Holden VF Commodore	SMP; R1	SMP; R2	WAN; R3	WAN; R4	TOW; R5	TOW; R6	SAN; R7	SAN; R8	BAT; R9	BAT; R10	ADE; R11	ADE; R12																				

== Super3 drivers ==
The following is a list of drivers who have driven for the team in the Super3 Series, in order of first appearance. Drivers who only drove for the team on a part-time basis are listed in italics

- (Australia) Ben Eggleston (2009-2010)
- (Australia) Cameron McConville (2014)
- (Australia) Justin Ruggier (2014)
- (Australia) Liam McAdam (2015)
- (Australia) Jack Perkins (2015)
- (Australia) Steven Page (2021-2022)
- (Australia) Kai Allen (2022)
- (New Zealand) Matthew McCutcheon (2023)

== Super3 Results ==
=== Car No. 26 results ===
Year	Driver	No.	Make	1	2	3	4	5	6	7	8	9	10	11	12	13	14	15	16	17	18	19	20	21	22	23	24	25	26	27	28	29	30	Position	Pts
2010	Ben Eggleston	38	Holden VX Commodore	ADE; R1	ADE; R2	QLD; R3	QLD; R4	QLD; R5	WIN; R6	WIN; R7	WIN; R8	TOW; R9; Ret	TOW; R10; 7	TOW; R11; 2	BAT; R12	BAT; R13	SAN; R14	SAN; R15	SAN; R16	HOM; R17	HOM; R18														
2014	Cameron McConville	38	Holden VZ Commodore	ADE; R1	ADE; R2	WIN; R3	WIN; R4	BAR; R5	BAR; R6	TOW; R7	TOW; R8	QLD; R9	QLD; R10	BAT; R11	HOM; R12	HOM; R13																			
2015	Liam McAdam	38	Holden VZ Commodore	ADE	ADE	BAR	BAR	BAR	WIN	WIN	WIN	TOW	TOW	QLD	QLD	QLD	BAT	HOM	HOM																
2017	Tyler Greenbury	38	Holden VE Commodore	PHI; R1; 1	PHI; R2; 1	PHI; R3; Ret	WIN; R4; 2	WIN; R5; 1	WIN; R6; Ret	QLD; R7; 2	QLD; R8; 3	QLD; R9; 3	PHI; R10; 1	PHI; R11; 5	PHI; R12; Ret	SMP; R13; 2	SMP; R14; 2	SMP; R15; 2																2nd	454
2021	Steven Page	2	Holden VE Commodore	BAT; R1; Ret	BAT; R2; Ret	TOW1; R3; 6	TOW1; R4; 8	TOW2; R5	TOW2; R6	SMP; R7; 10	SMP; R8; C	BAT; R9; 5	BAT; R10; Ret																					9th	381
2022	Kai Allen	26	Holden VE Commodore	SMP; R1; 2	SMP; R2; 1	WAN; R3; 1	WAN; R4; 1	TOW; R5; 2	TOW; R6; 1	SAN; R7; 1	SAN; R8; 10	BAT; R9; 1	BAT; R10; C	ADE; R11; 2	ADE; R12; Ret																			2nd	1392
