= Bryce Fullwood =

Australian racing driver

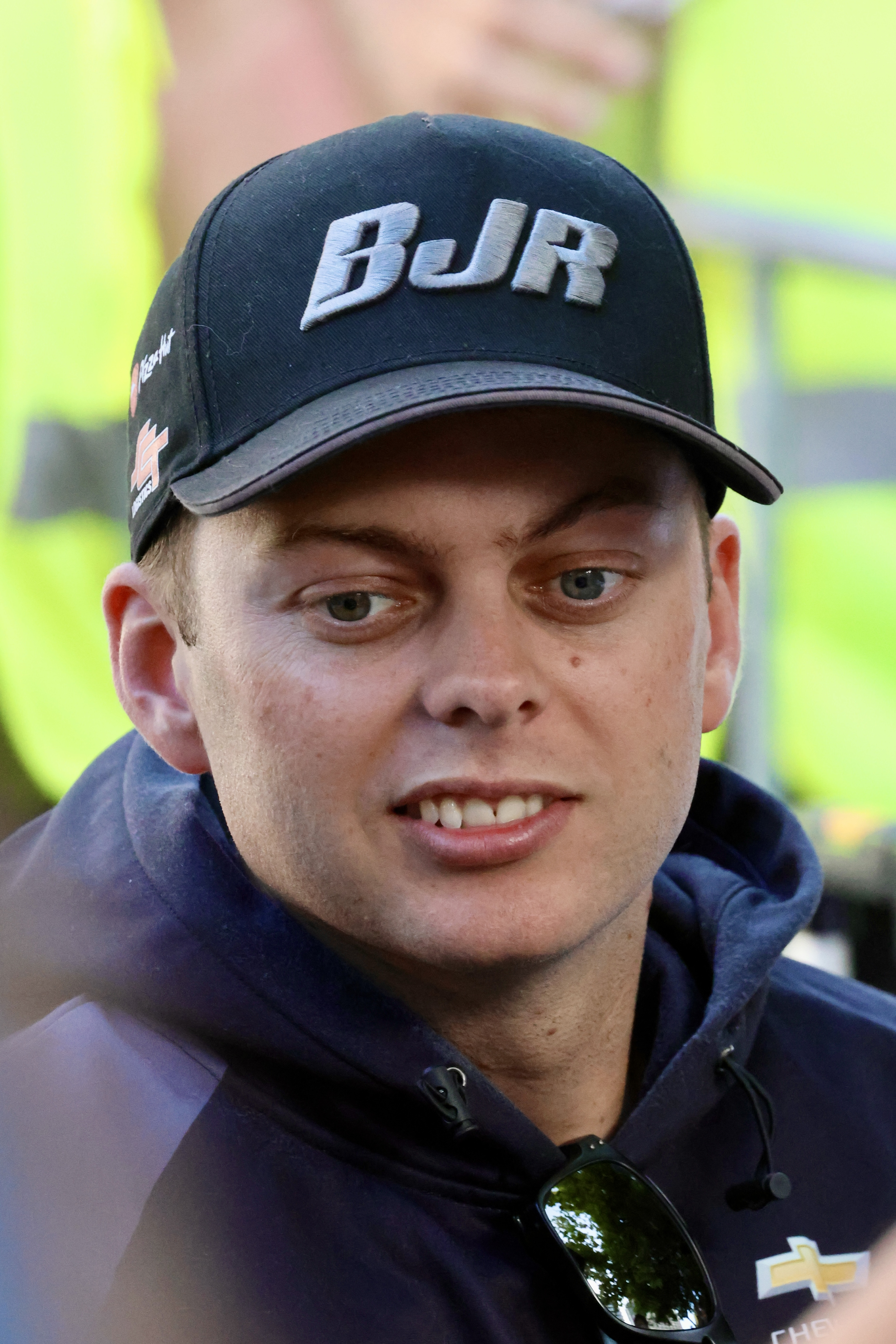
- Fullwood at the Adelaide Street Circuit in 2025
- Nationality: Australian
- Born: 11 May 1998 (age 28) Darwin, Northern Territory, Australia

Supercars Championship career
- Debut season: 2020
- Current team: Brad Jones Racing
- Categorisation: FIA Silver
- Car number: 14
- Former teams: Walkinshaw Andretti United
- Starts: 160
- Wins: 0
- Podiums: 3
- Poles: 0
- Best finish: 11th in 2023

Championship titles
- 2019: Dunlop Super2 Series

Bryce Fullwood (born 11 May 1998 in Darwin, Australia) is an Australian racing driver. He previously raced in the Repco Supercars Championship with Brad Jones Racing in the No. 14 Chevrolet Camaro ZL1 In 2019, Fullwood won the Dunlop Super2 Series with MW Motorsport.

== Racing record ==
=== Karting career summary ===
Season	Series	Position
2012	Australian National Sprint Kart Championship - Junior National Light	2nd
2013	Australian National Sprint Kart Championship - Junior National Light	1st
2013	CIK Stars of Karting - Pro Junior (KF3)	19th
2013	SKUSA SuperNationals XVII - Rotax Junior	3rd
2013	Australian National Sprint Kart Championship - Junior National Heavy	5th
2014	Australian National Sprint Kart Championship - Junior Clubman	8th
2014	Australian National Sprint Kart Championship - Junior National Heavy	6th
2014	RMC Grand Finals - Junior Max	11th

=== Circuit career results ===
Season	Series	Position	Car	Team
2015	V8 Supercars Dunlop Series	17th	Holden VE Commodore; Ford FG Falcon	Paul Morris Motorsport; MW Motorsport
2016	Supercars Dunlop Series	14th	Ford FG Falcon	MW Motorsport
2016	Kumho Tyres Australian V8 Touring Car Series	17th	Ford BF Falcon	MW Motorsport
2017	Dunlop Super2 Series	11th	Ford FG Falcon; Nissan Altima L33	MW Motorsport
2018	Dunlop Super2 Series	17th	Ford FG X Falcon; Holden VF Commodore	Matt Stone Racing
2018	Virgin Australia Supercars Championship	47th	Holden VF Commodore	Matt Stone Racing
2019	Dunlop Super2 Series	1st	Nissan Altima L33	MW Motorsport
2019	Virgin Australia Supercars Championship	48th	Nissan Altima L33	Kelly Racing
2020	Virgin Australia Supercars Championship	18th	Holden ZB Commodore	Walkinshaw Andretti United
2021	Repco Supercars Championship	14th	Holden ZB Commodore	Walkinshaw Andretti United
2022	Repco Supercars Championship	17th	Holden ZB Commodore	Brad Jones Racing
2023	Repco Supercars Championship	11th	Chevrolet Camaro ZL1	Brad Jones Racing
2024	Repco Supercars Championship	18th	Chevrolet Camaro ZL1	Brad Jones Racing
2025	Repco Supercars Championship	18th	Chevrolet Camaro ZL1	Brad Jones Racing

=== Super3 Series results ===
(key)

Super3 Series results
Year	Team	No.	Car	1	2	3	4	5	6	7	8	9	10	11	12	13	14	15	Position	Points
2016	MW Motorsport	26	Ford BF Falcon	SAN; R1; DNS	SAN; R2; 2	SAN; R3; 2	WIN; R4	WIN; R5	WIN; R6	QLD; R7	QLD; R8	QLD; R9	PHI; R10	PHI; R11	PHI; R12	SMP; R13	SMP; R14	SMP; R15	17th	88

=== Super2 Series results ===
(key)

Super2 Series results
Year	Team	No.	Car	1	2	3	4	5	6	7	8	9	10	11	12	13	14	15	16	17	18	19	20	21	Position	Points
2015	Paul Morris Motorsport	16	Holden VE Commodore	ADE; R1; 20	ADE; R2; Ret	BAR; R3; DNS	BAR; R4; 14	BAR; R5; 12	WIN; R6; 20	WIN; R7; 20	WIN; R8; 20	TOW; R9; Ret	TOW; R10; 11	QLD; R11; Ret	QLD; R12; 11	QLD; R13; 12	BAT; R14; 18								17th	647
2015	MW Motorsport	28	Ford FG Falcon															SYD; R15; 10	SYD; R16; 10						17th	647
2016	MW Motorsport	16	Ford FG Falcon	ADE; R1; DNS	ADE; R2; DNS	PHI; R3; 11	PHI; R4; 7	PHI; R5; 12	BAR; R6; 14	BAR; R7; 11	BAR; R8; 7	TOW; R9; 10	TOW; R10; 18	SAN; R11; 8	SAN; R12; Ret	SAN; R13; DNS	BAT; R14; 12	SYD; R15; 3	SYD; R16; 9						14th	802
2017	MW Motorsport	16	Ford FG Falcon	ADE; R1; 8	ADE; R2; 12	ADE; R3; 8	SYM; R4; 17	SYM; R5; Ret	SYM; R6; DNS	SYM; R7; DNS	PHI; R8; 18	PHI; R9; 10	PHI; R10; 21	PHI; R11; 15											11th	1035
2017	MW Motorsport	16	Nissan L33 Altima												TOW; R12; 15	TOW; R13; 3	SMP; R14; 13	SMP; R15; 10	SMP; R16; 13	SMP; R17; 7	SAN; R18; 21	SAN; R19; 2	NEW; R20; 5	NEW; R21; 3	11th	1035
2018	Matt Stone Racing	16	Ford FG X Falcon	ADE; R1; 12	ADE; R2; 10	ADE; R3; 19	SYM; R4; 17	SYM; R5; 18	SYM; R6; 15	BAR; R7; 11	BAR; R8; 13	BAR; R9; 11													17th	755
2018	Matt Stone Racing	16	Holden VF Commodore										TOW; R10; 12	TOW; R11; 10	SAN; R12; 10	SAN; R13; 9	BAT; R14; Ret	NEW; R15; 13	NEW; R16; C						17th	755
2019	MW Motorsport	16	Nissan L33 Altima	ADE; R 1	ADE; R 2	ADE; R 1	BAR; R 4	BAR; R 2	TOW; R 1	TOW; R 1	QLD; R 2	QLD; R 1	BAT; R 2	SAN; R 6	SAN; R 4	NEW; R 1	NEW; R 2								1st	1924

=== Supercars Championship results ===
Supercars results
Year	Team	No.	Car	1	2	3	4	5	6	7	8	9	10	11	12	13	14	15	16	17	18	19	20	21	22	23	24	25	26	27	28	29	30	31	32	33	34	Position	Points
2018	Matt Stone Racing	35	Holden VF Commodore	ADE; R1	ADE; R2	MEL; R3	MEL; R4	MEL; R5	MEL; R6	SYM; R7	SYM; R8	PHI; R9	PHI; R10	BAR; R11	BAR; R12	WIN; R13; PO	WIN; R14; PO	HID; R15	HID; R16	TOW; R17	TOW; R18	QLD; R19; PO	QLD; R20; PO	SMP; R21	BEN; R22	BEN; R23	SAN; QR; 21	SAN; R24; 21	BAT; R25; 20	SUR; R26; 20	SUR; R27; C	PUK; R28	PUK; R29	NEW; R30	NEW; R31			47th	219
2019	Kelly Racing	7	Nissan Altima L33	ADE; R1	ADE; R2	MEL; R3	MEL; R4	MEL; R5	MEL; R6	SYM; R7	SYM; R8	PHI; R9	PHI; R10	BAR; R11	BAR; R12	WIN; R13	WIN; R14	HID; R15	HID; R16	TOW; R17	TOW; R18	QLD; R19	QLD; R20	BEN; R21	BEN; R22	PUK; R23	PUK; R24	BAT; R25; Ret	SUR; R26; Ret	SUR; R27; 21	SAN; QR; 4	SAN; R28; 8	NEW; R29	NEW; R30				48th	232
2020	Walkinshaw Andretti United	2	Holden ZB Commodore	ADE; R1; 21	ADE; R2; 17	MEL; R3; C	MEL; R4; C	MEL; R5; C	MEL; R6; C	SMP1; R7; 13	SMP1; R8; 20	SMP1; R9; 10	SMP2; R10; 15	SMP2; R11; 15	SMP2; R12; 7	HID1; R13; 21	HID1; R14; 18	HID1; R15; 19	HID2; R16; 19	HID2; R17; 17	HID2; R18; 17	TOW1; R19; 8	TOW1; R20; 19	TOW1; R21; 12	TOW2; R22; 17	TOW2; R23; 12	TOW2; R24; 18	BEN1; R25; 3	BEN1; R26; 16	BEN1; R27; 19	BEN2; R28; 15	BEN2; R29; 18	BEN2; R30; 19	BAT; R31; Ret				18th	1092
2021	Walkinshaw Andretti United	2	Holden ZB Commodore	BAT1; R1; 5	BAT1; R2; 13	SAN; R3; 24	SAN; R4; 15	SAN; R5; 13	SYM; R6; 23	SYM; R7; 17	SYM; R8; 17	BEN; R9; 16	BEN; R10; 6	BEN; R11; 14	HID; R12; 11	HID; R13; 12	HID; R14; 14	TOW1; R15; 11	TOW1; R16; 13	TOW2; R17; 21	TOW2; R18; 14	TOW2; R19; 11	SMP1; R20; 18	SMP1; R21; 12	SMP1; R22; 18	SMP2; R23; 10	SMP2; R24; 16	SMP2; R25; 22	SMP3; R26; Ret	SMP3; R27; 10	SMP3; R28; 14	SMP4; R29; 23	SMP4; R30; C	BAT2; R31; 5				14th	1491
2022	Brad Jones Racing	14	Holden ZB Commodore	SMP; R1; 12	SMP; R2; 19	SYM; R3; 15	SYM; R4; 18	SYM; R5; 21	MEL; R6; 10	MEL; R7; 10	MEL; R8; 22	MEL; R9; 19	BAR; R10; Ret	BAR; R11; NC	BAR; R12; 14	WIN; R13; 20	WIN; R14; 21	WIN; R15; 23	HID; R16; 18	HID; R17; 15	HID; R18; 14	TOW; R19; 15	TOW; R20; 13	BEN; R21; 17	BEN; R22; 10	BEN; R23; 17	SAN; R24; 16	SAN; R25; 21	SAN; R26; 14	PUK; R27; 22	PUK; R28; 11	PUK; R29; 13	BAT; R30; 9	SUR; R31; 22	SUR; R32; 13	ADE; R33; 17	ADE; R34; Ret	17th	1383
2023	Brad Jones Racing	14	Chevrolet Camaro ZL1	NEW; R1; 15	NEW; R2; 11	MEL; R3; 11	MEL; R4; 7	MEL; R5; 12	MEL; R6; 18	BAR; R7; 14	BAR; R8; 12	BAR; R9; 17	SYM; R10; 19	SYM; R11; 17	SYM; R12; 10	HID; R13; 5	HID; R14; 8	HID; R15; 11	TOW; R16; 8	TOW; R17; 9	SMP; R18; 8	SMP; R19; 5	BEN; R20; 21	BEN; R21; 8	BEN; R22; 23	SAN; R23; 14	BAT; R24; 7	SUR; R25; 22	SUR; R26; 10	ADE; R27; 19	ADE; R28; 18							11th	1722
2024	Brad Jones Racing	14	Chevrolet Camaro ZL1	BAT1; R1; 7	BAT1; R2; 12	MEL; R3; 17	MEL; R4; 15	MEL; R5; 21	MEL; R6; 21	TAU; R7; Ret	TAU; R8; 18	BAR; R9; 15	BAR; R10; 17	HID; R11; 17	HID; R12; 18	TOW; R13; 11	TOW; R14; 15	SMP; R15; 19	SMP; R16; 18	SYM; R17; 10	SYM; R18; 3	SAN; R19; 9	BAT; R20; 22	SUR; R21; 20	SUR; R22; 18	ADE; R23; 11	ADE; R24; 12											18th	1459
2025	Brad Jones Racing	14	Chevrolet Camaro ZL1	SYD; R1; 9	SYD; R2; 19	SYD; R3; 20	MEL; R4; 15	MEL; R5; 16	MEL; R6; 21	MEL; R7; C	TAU; R8; 16	TAU; R9; 12	TAU; R10; 24	SYM; R11; 3	SYM; R12; 14	SYM; R13; 20	BAR; R14; 8	BAR; R15; 13	BAR; R16; 20	HID; R17; 4	HID; R18; 6	HID; R19; 10	TOW; R20; 5	TOW; R21; 11	TOW; R22; 9	QLD; R23; 23	QLD; R24; 11	QLD; R25; 13	BEN; R26; 20	BAT; R27; 21	SUR; R28; 11	SUR; R29; 21	SAN; R30; 9	SAN; R31; 8	ADE; R32; 22	ADE; R33; 24	ADE; R34; 10	15th	1340

=== Bathurst 1000 results ===
Year	Team	Car	Co-driver	Position	Laps
2018	Matt Stone Racing	Holden Commodore VF	(Australia) Todd Hazelwood	20th	159
2019	Kelly Racing	Nissan Altima L33	(New Zealand) Andre Heimgartner	DNF	157
2020	Walkinshaw Andretti United	Holden Commodore ZB	(Australia) Kurt Kostecki	DNF	147
2021	Walkinshaw Andretti United	Holden Commodore ZB	(Australia) Warren Luff	5th	161
2022	Brad Jones Racing	Holden Commodore ZB	(Australia) Dean Fiore	9th	161
2023	Brad Jones Racing	Chevrolet Camaro Mk.6	(Australia) Dean Fiore	7th	161
2024	Brad Jones Racing	Chevrolet Camaro Mk.6	(Australia) Jaylyn Robotham	22nd	160
2025	Brad Jones Racing	Chevrolet Camaro Mk.6	(Australia) Brad Vaughan	21st	140
2026	Brad Jones Racing	Toyota GR Supra	(Australia) Andre Heimgartner	7th	161

=== Complete Bathurst 12 Hour results ===
Year	Car#	Team	Co-drivers	Car	Class	Laps	Pos.	Class pos.
2016	94	MARC Cars Australia	(Australia) Gerard McLeod (Australia) Nick Rowe	MARC Mazda 3 GTC	I	195	19th	5th
2017	95	MARC Cars Australia	(Australia) Geoff Taunton (Australia) Jason Busk	MARC Focus V8	I	258	25th	4th
2018	95	MARC Cars Australia	(Australia) Geoff Taunton (Australia) Jason Busk	MARC Focus V8	I	244	DNF	DNF

=== Bathurst 6 Hour results ===
Year	Team	Co-drivers	Car	Class	Laps	Pos.	Class pos.
2025	(Australia) Ultimate Diesel Tuning	(Australia) Trent Whyte	Ford Mustang Mach 1	A2	120	10th	4th
2026	(Australia) Ultimate Diesel Tuning	(Australia) Trent Whyte (Australia) Cooper Barnes	Ford Mustang Mach 1	A2	2	DNF	DNF

=== 12 Hours of Malaysia results ===
Year	Team	Co-drivers	Car	Class	Laps	Pos.	Class pos.
2025	(Germany) Cerny Motorsport	(Australia) Damien Hamilton (United States) Spencer Propper (United States) Alec Udell	BMW M4 GT4 (G82)	GT4	273	15th	1st

Sporting positions
Preceded by Chris Pither	Dunlop Super2 Series; Champion; 2019	Succeeded by Thomas Randle
