= Super2 Series =

Australian touring car racing competition

- Category: Touring car racing
- Country: Australia
- Inaugural season: 2000
- Drivers: 20
- Teams: 9
- Constructors: (United States) Ford (Australia) Holden
- Tyre suppliers: Dunlop
- Drivers' champion: (Australia) Rylan Gray
- Makes' champion: (United States) Ford
- Teams' champion: Tickford Racing
- Official website: www.supercars.com

The Dunlop Super2 Series (formerly known as Dunlop Series, Fujitsu V8 Supercars Series, HPDC V8 Supercars Series, Konica Minolta V8 Supercars Series and Konica V8 Supercars/Lites Series) is an Australian touring car racing competition, specifically the second tier series for Supercars competitors. Competing vehicles are older than those utilised in the Supercars Championship series and are usually run by smaller teams with lower budgets.

The vast majority of drivers in the Supercars Championship have raced at least one season in the Super2 Series Championship. For parts of its history, competing in the Super2 Series was required for most drivers to qualify for a Motorsport Australia Superlicence, which is required to compete in the Supercars Championship, or was enforced as a separate requirement by the Supercars Championship organisers.

== History ==
The series was first held in 2000 as the 2000 Konica V8 Lites Series and this inaugural contest was won by Dean Canto. Towards the end of the season Stone Brothers Racing entered a car for David Besnard as preparation for the long distance races, in the main V8 Supercar series, the Queensland 500 and the Bathurst 1000, which unlike the other races require two drivers for each competing vehicle. Since then main series teams have used the series to help get their endurance co-drivers up-to-speed, or have employed drivers competing for other Fujitsu Series teams. While originally Fujitsu Series teams were allowed to enter main series events, this has since been discontinued as all main series events are limited to those teams carrying valid franchise slots for the main series, although in limited circumstances Fujitsu series teams have been able to lease entries from main series teams.

The 2007 champion, Tony D'Alberto, drove for the Tony D'Alberto Racing team, and like many of his predecessors, graduated to the V8 Supercar series in 2008, again with the family team.

From the 2009 Season and onward all Super2 Series rounds have run on the Main Supercars Championship calendar as a support category.

This series carries the colloquial title of 'Development Series' which was the name given to the series by V8 Supercar Australia between the 2004 and 2005 seasons. The colloquial title is referred to in many conversations, even though there has never been a Development Series race because a naming rights sponsor was found before the start of the 2005 season.

Started during the 2016 year season of the Dunlop Super2 Series (Named as Supercars Dunlop Series) Car of The Future later known as New Generation V8 Supercar specification cars were eligible in the series.

In the 2021 season of the series, The Kumho Tyre V8 Touring Car Series (Later named as Kumho Tyre Super3 Series in 2019 before being named as Dunlop Super3 Series) joined alongside the Dunlop Super2 Series category for the first time as a class racing on track at the same time.

Started in the year 2023 season of the Dunlop Super2 & Super3 Series only the Gen2 Specification built cars (Holden Commodore ZB & Ford Mustang GT (S550)) were to become eligible in the Super2 Series class. Car of The Future also known as New Generation V8 Supercar specification built cars were sold & sent down to teams in the Super3 Series class of the Dunlop Super2 & Super3 Series.

Starting in the 2025 year season the Dunlop Series will revert down to a single class of the Super2 Series removing the Super3 Series due to low grid numbers with as much as two or three cars in the Super3 Series class during round weekends of the 2024 Dunlop Super2 & Super3 Series season. Cars that were built under Car of The Future (Also Known as New Generation V8 Supercar) Regulations such as the Holden Commodore VF, Ford Falcon FG-X and Nissan Altima are set to be re-eligible back in the Super2 Series in the 2025 Year season.

== Championship format ==
The Super2 series runs at a subset of Supercars Championship rounds (for instance in 2025, there will be six Super2 rounds).

During each round, there are two races of 40 minutes duration, one on the Saturday and one on the Sunday of the race weekend. There is a separate qualifying session for each race.

Championship points for each race result are awarded on a sliding scale, with each race result given equal weighting (unlike in the Supercars Championship, where longer races are awarded more points).

== Costs ==
One 2023 estimate puts the cost of competing in the Super2 series for a season at "up to A$600,000...for a top team car". While much lower than the Supercars Championship, it is much higher than many other Australian racing series such as the Trico Trans-Am Series, TCR Australia Touring Car Series, and the now-defunct S5000 Australian Drivers Championship.

== Series winners ==
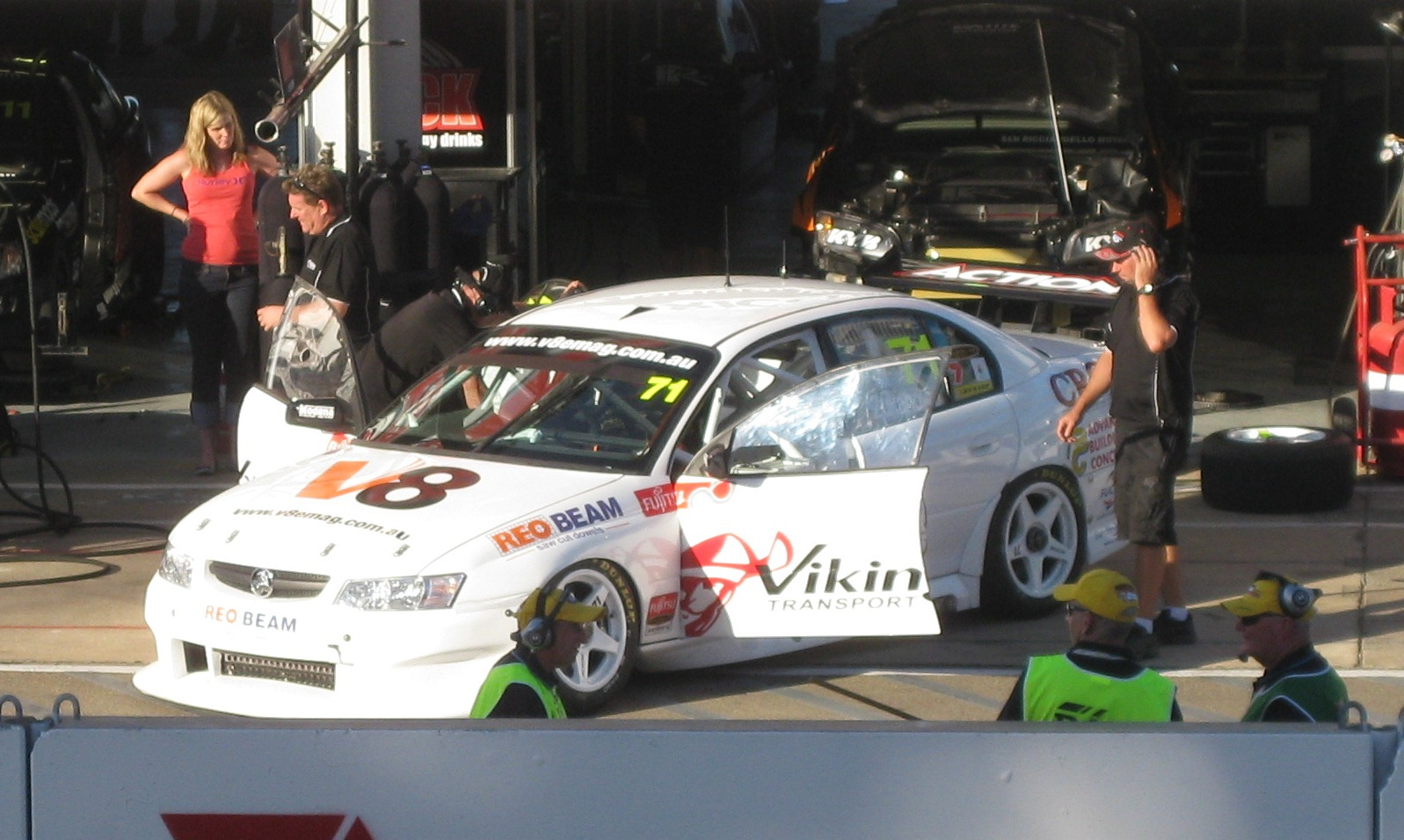
The Holden VZ Commodore of Marcus Zukanovic at the Adelaide Parklands Circuit for the opening round of the 2010 Dunlop Super2 Series (Back then as the 2010 Fujitsu V8 Supercar Series).

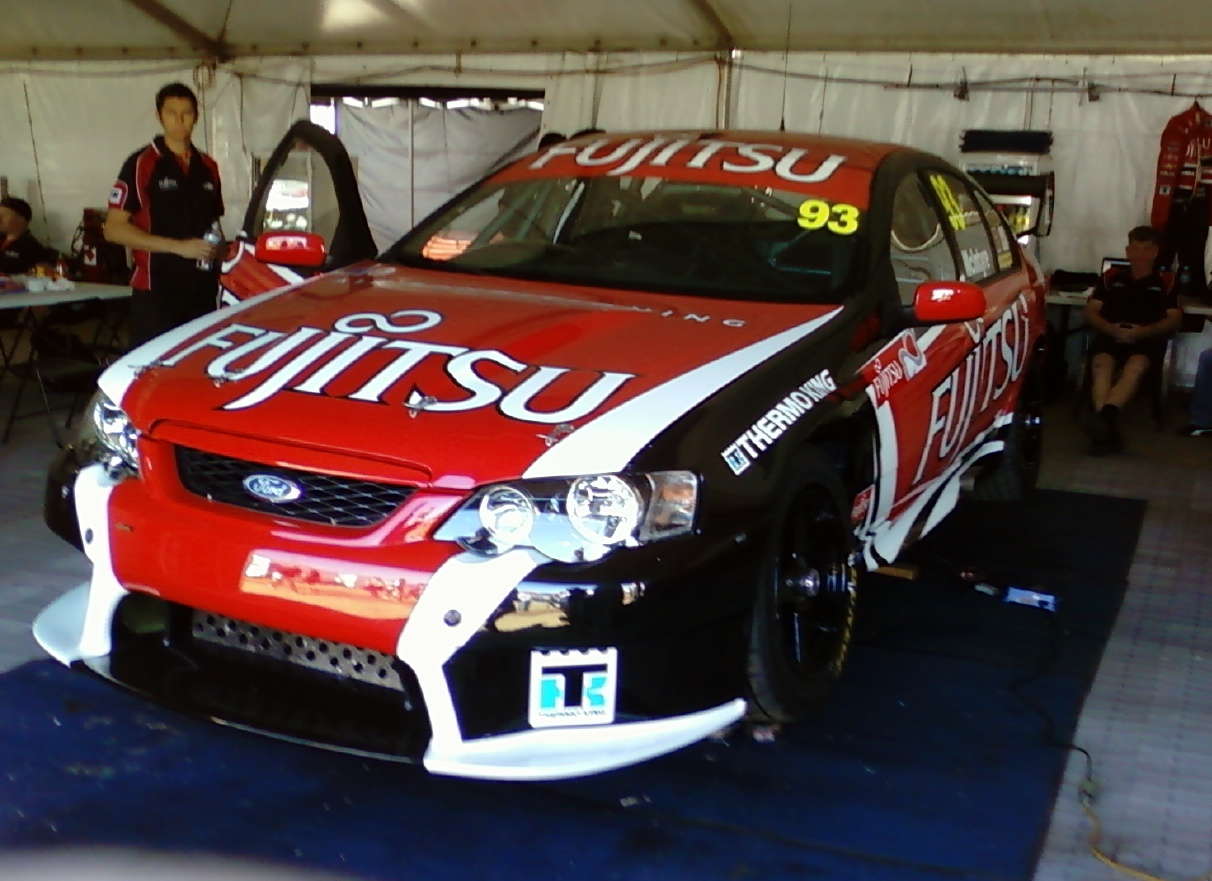
The Ford BF Falcon of John McIntyre at the Adelaide Parklands Circuit for the opening round of the 2010 Dunlop Super2 Series (Back then as the 2010 Fujitsu V8 Supercar Series).

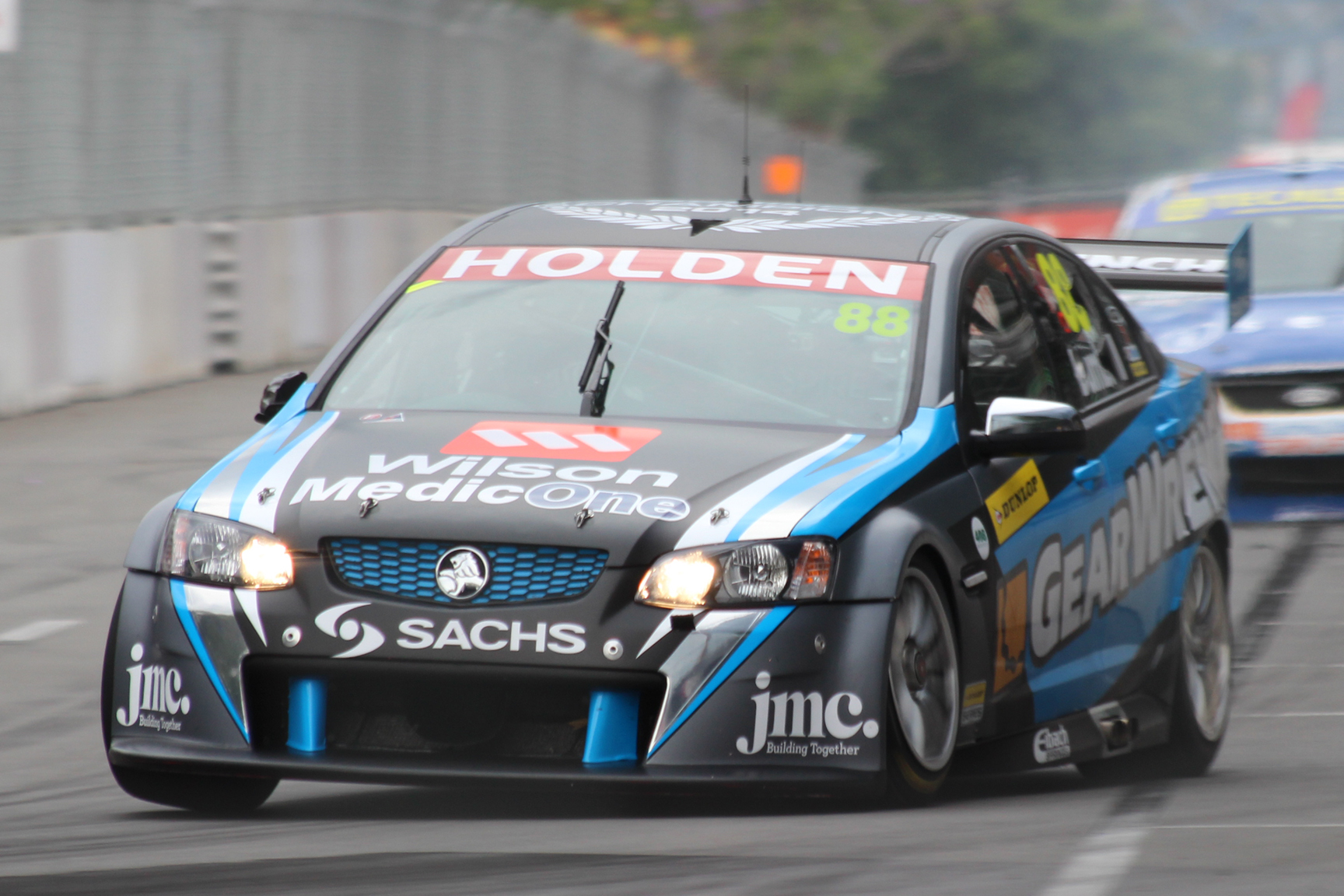
The Holden VE Commodore of Paul Dumbrell at the 2014 Sydney NRMA 500

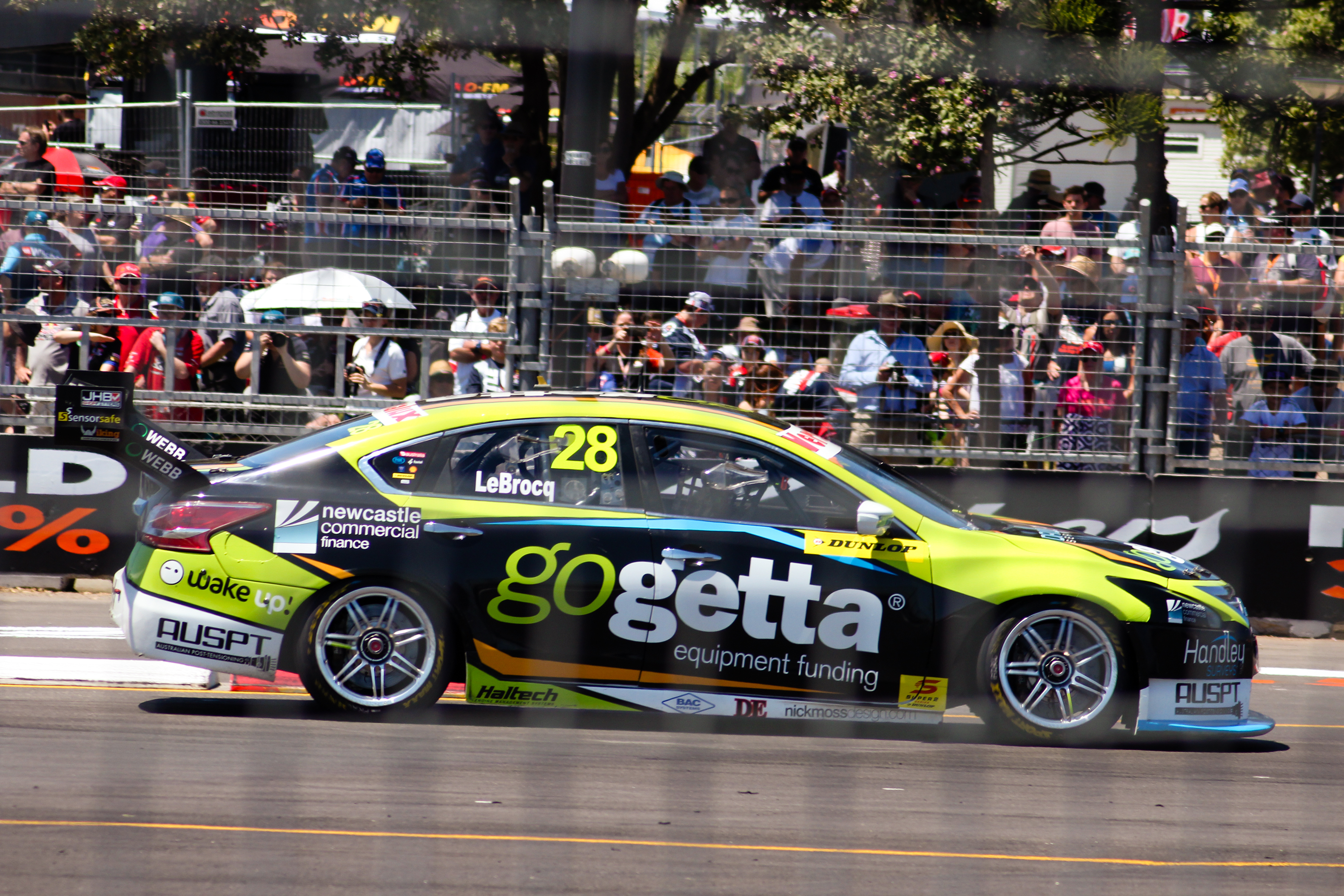
The Nissan Altima (L33) of Jack Le Brocq at the Newcastle Street Circuit for the 2017 Coates Hire Newcastle 500

Season	Series Name	Series Winner	Car	Team
2000	Konica V8 Lites Series	(Australia) Dean Canto	Ford EL Falcon	Dean Canto Racing
2001	Konica V8 Supercar Series	(New Zealand) Simon Wills	Holden VT Commodore	Team Dynamik
2002	Konica V8 Supercar Series	(Australia) Paul Dumbrell	Holden VX Commodore	Independent Race Cars Australia
2003	Konica V8 Supercar Series	(Australia) Mark Winterbottom	Ford AU Falcon	Stone Brothers Racing
2004	Konica Minolta V8 Supercar Series	(Australia) Andrew Jones	Ford AU Falcon	Brad Jones Racing
2005	HPDC V8 Supercar Series	(Australia) Dean Canto	Ford BA Falcon	Dick Johnson Racing
2006	Fujitsu V8 Supercar Series	(Australia) Adam Macrow	Ford BA Falcon	Howard Racing
2007	Fujitsu V8 Supercar Series	(Australia) Tony D'Alberto	Holden VZ Commodore	Tony D'Alberto Racing
2008	Fujitsu V8 Supercar Series	(Australia) Steve Owen	Holden VZ Commodore	Scott Loadsman Racing
2009	Fujitsu V8 Supercar Series	(Australia) Jonathon Webb	Ford BF Falcon	MW Motorsport
2010	Fujitsu V8 Supercar Series	(Australia) Steve Owen	Holden VE Commodore	Greg Murphy Racing
2011	Fujitsu V8 Supercar Series	(Australia) Andrew Thompson	Holden VE Commodore	Triple Eight Race Engineering
2012	Dunlop V8 Supercar Series	(New Zealand) Scott McLaughlin	Ford FG Falcon	Stone Brothers Racing; Matt Stone Racing
2013	Dunlop V8 Supercar Series	(Australia) Dale Wood	Ford FG Falcon	MW Motorsport
2014	Dunlop V8 Supercar Series	(Australia) Paul Dumbrell	Holden VE Commodore	Eggleston Motorsport
2015	V8 Supercars Dunlop Series	(Australia) Cam Waters	Ford FG Falcon	Prodrive Racing Australia
2016	Supercars Dunlop Series	(Australia) Garry Jacobson	Ford FG X Falcon	Prodrive Racing Australia
2017	Dunlop Super2 Series	(Australia) Todd Hazelwood	Holden VF Commodore	Matt Stone Racing
2018	Dunlop Super2 Series	(New Zealand) Chris Pither	Holden VF Commodore	Garry Rogers Motorsport
2019	Dunlop Super2 Series	(Australia) Bryce Fullwood	Nissan Altima L33	MW Motorsport
2020	Dunlop Super2 Series	(Australia) Thomas Randle	Nissan Altima L33	MW Motorsport
2021	Dunlop Super2 Series	(Australia) Broc Feeney	Holden VF Commodore	Triple Eight Race Engineering
2022	Dunlop Super2 Series	(Australia) Declan Fraser	Holden VF Commodore	Triple Eight Race Engineering
2023	Dunlop Super2 Series	(Australia) Kai Allen	Holden ZB Commodore	Eggleston Motorsport
2024	Dunlop Super2 Series	(Australia) Zach Bates	Holden ZB Commodore	Walkinshaw Andretti United
2025	Dunlop Super2 Series	(Australia) Rylan Gray	Ford Mustang GT	Tickford Racing

=== Rookie of the Year Winners ===
Season	Winner	Car	Team
2021	(Australia) Matt McLean	Holden Commodore VF	Eggleston Motorsport
2022	(New Zealand) Matthew Payne	Nissan Altima L33	Grove Racing
2023	(Australia) Kai Allen	Holden Commodore ZB	Eggleston Motorsport
2024	(Australia) Jarrod Hughes	Holden Commodore ZB	Image Racing
2025	(Australia) Ben Gomersall	Holden Commodore ZB	Triple Eight Race Engineering

== Driver Records ==
Series Wins
	Driver	Titles
1	(Australia) Dean Canto (2000, 2005)	2
1	(Australia) Paul Dumbrell (2002, 2014)	2
1	(Australia) Steve Owen (2008, 2010)	2
4	(New Zealand) Simon Wills (2001)	1
4	(Australia) Mark Winterbottom (2003)	1
4	(Australia) Andrew Jones (2004)	1
4	(Australia) Adam Macrow (2006)	1
4	(Australia) Tony D'Alberto (2007)	1
4	(Australia) Jonathon Webb (2009)	1
4	(Australia) Andrew Thompson (2011)	1
4	(New Zealand) Scott McLaughlin (2012)	1
4	(Australia) Dale Wood (2013)	1
4	(Australia) Cam Waters (2015)	1
4	(Australia) Garry Jacobson (2016)	1
4	(Australia) Todd Hazelwood (2017)	1
4	(New Zealand) Chris Pither (2018)	1
4	(Australia) Bryce Fullwood (2019)	1
4	(Australia) Thomas Randle (2020)	1
4	(Australia) Broc Feeney (2021)	1
4	(Australia) Declan Fraser (2022)	1
4	(Australia) Kai Allen (2023)	1
4	(Australia) Zach Bates (2024)	1
4	(Australia) Rylan Gray (2025)	1

Driver Race Starts (Top-20)
	Driver	Starts
1	(Australia) Aaron McGill	170
2	(Australia) Geoff Emery	140
2	(Australia) Marcus Zukanovic	140
2	(Australia) Andrew Jones	140
5	(Australia) Jack Perkins	123
6	(Australia) Matt Chahda	121
7	(Australia) Drew Russell	112
8	(Australia) Paul Dumbrell	111
9	(Australia) Taz Douglas	104
10	(Australia) Aaren Russell	100
11	(Australia) Garry Jacobson	99
12	(Australia) Luke Youlden	98
13	(Australia) Matthew White	90
14	(New Zealand) Chris Pither	89
15	(Australia) Jay Verdnik	88
16	(Australia) Rodney Jane	84
17	(Australia) Adam Wallis	83
18	(Australia) Tony D'Alberto	82
19	(Australia) Steve Owen	81
20	(Australia) Terry Wyhoon	80

Driver Race Wins (Top-20)
	Driver	Wins
1	(Australia) Paul Dumbrell	41
2	(Australia) Dean Canto	21
3	(Australia) Steve Owen	20
4	(Australia) Andrew Thompson	16
5	(Australia) Owen Kelly	13
6	(Australia) Cam Waters	12
6	(Australia) Adam Macrow	12
8	(Australia) Jack Le Brocq	11
9	(New Zealand) Simon Wills	10
10	(Australia) David Russell	9
10	(Australia) Jack Perkins	9
12	(Australia) Mark Winterbottom	8
12	(Australia) Jonathon Webb	8
14	(Australia) Garry Jacobson	7
14	(Australia) Ashley Walsh	7
16	(Australia) Bryce Fullwood	6
16	(Australia) Michael Caruso	6
16	(Australia) Todd Hazelwood	6
16	(Australia) Brodie Kostecki	6
16	(Australia) Nick Percat	6

Driver Round Wins
	Driver	Round Wins
1	(Australia) Paul Dumbrell	16
2	(Australia) Steve Owen	10
3	(Australia) Dean Canto	9
4	(Australia) Andrew Thompson	8
5	(Australia) Adam Macrow	7
6	(Australia) Cam Waters	5
6	(Australia) Zak Best	5
8	(Australia) Mark Winterbottom	4
8	(Australia) Jonathon Webb	4
8	(Australia) Bryce Fullwood	4
8	(Australia) Owen Kelly	4
12	(Australia) Kai Allen	3
12	(Australia) Broc Feeney	3
12	(Australia) Garry Jacobson	3
12	(Australia) Andrew Jones	3
12	(Australia) Thomas Randle	3
12	(Australia) Zach Bates	3
18	(New Zealand) Simon Wills	2
18	(New Zealand) Scott McLaughlin	2
18	(Australia) Todd Hazelwood	2
18	(Australia) Declan Fraser	2
18	(New Zealand) Chris Pither	2
18	(Australia) Tony D'Alberto	2
24	(Australia) Dale Wood	1
24	(Australia) Matthew White	1

Note: bold text indicates active drivers.

== Team Records ==
Teams Championships
	Team	Titles
1	MW Motorsport	4
2	Triple Eight Race Engineering	3
2	**Tickford Racing**	3
4	Stone Brothers Racing	2
4	**Eggleston Motorsport**	2
6	Dean Canto Racing	1
6	Team Dynamik	1
6	Independent Race Cars Australia	1
6	**Brad Jones Racing**	1
6	Dick Johnson Racing	1
6	Howard Racing	1
6	Tony D'Alberto Racing	1
6	Scott Loadsman Racing	1
6	Greg Murphy Racing	1
6	Matt Stone Racing	1
6	Garry Rogers Motorsport	1
6	Walkinshaw Andretti United	1

Team Round Wins (Top-5)
	Team	Round Wins
1	MW Motorsport	21
1	**Tickford Racing**	21
3	**Eggleston Motorsport**	18
4	Triple Eight Race Engineering	13
5	Howard Racing	11

Team Race Wins (Top-5)
	Team	Race Wins
1	MW Motorsport	51
2	**Tickford Racing**	43
3	**Eggleston Motorsport**	42
4	Howard Racing	24
5	Triple Eight Race Engineering	23

Note: bold text indicates active teams.
