= Matt McLean (racing driver) =

Australian racing driver

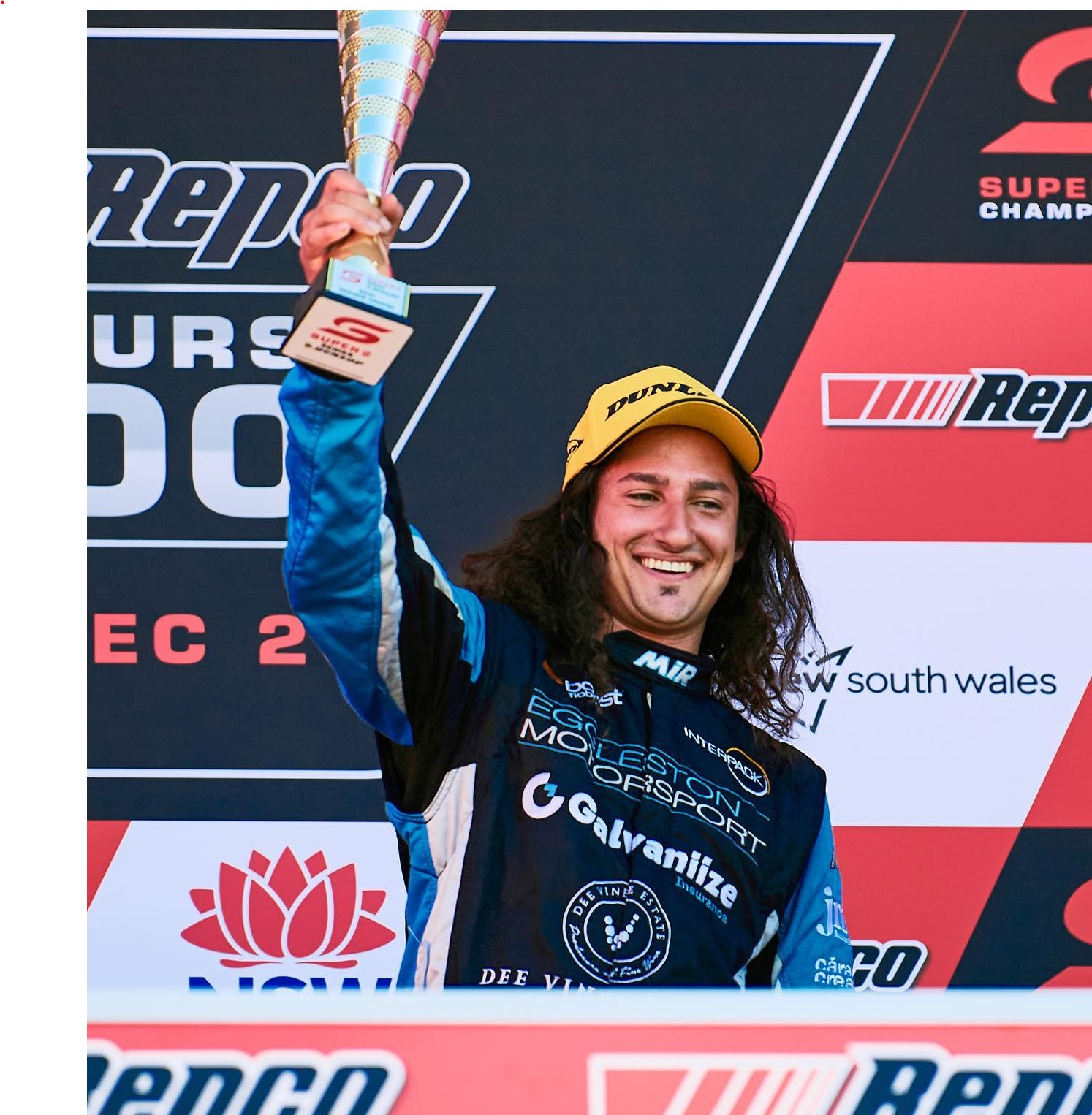
- McLean on the podium at Bathurst 1000
- Nationality: Australian
- Born: Matthew Adam McLean; 1 October 1996 (age 30) Melbourne, Australia

Super2 Series career
- Debut season: 2021
- Current team: Eggleston Motorsport
- Car number: 54
- Starts: 8
- Wins: 0
- Podiums: 0
- Poles: 0
- Best finish: 4th (Round) in 2021

Matthew Adam McLean (born 1 October 1996) is an Australian racing driver from Melbourne, Australia. He is currently competing in the Dunlop Super2 Series with Eggleston Motorsport, driving the No. 54 Holden VF Commodore.

== Career ==
=== Karting ===
McLean began karting in 2004 at seven years of age, mainly competing in club-level competition until entering his first season of National competition in 2015, winning on debut. McLean went on to finish the season in 4th place.

After a successful year, McLean signed with DPE Kart Technology as an official driver for Arrow Karts, and went on to win his first Australian Championship with the brand in 2016. The following year, he finished 2nd place in the Australian Championship, despite winning the most races, and reclaimed the title again in 2018.

McLean also represented Australia at the World Final in 2017, where he qualified in first before crashing out in the race.

In the latter stages of 2018, McLean partnered with Supercars Championship co-driver James Golding in an endurance karting race. The pair crossed the line 1st in a field including Bathurst 1000 champions Steve Richards and Chaz Mostert, and other Supercars Championship drivers Cameron Waters, Michael Caruso, Anton De Pasquale and André Heimgartner, as well as the best karters in Australia. This result is believed to have kick-started McLean's Supercar career.

=== Kumho Tyre Super3 Series ===
In 2019, McLean made the step from karting to the Super3 Series after a successful evaluation with Image Racing/Erebus Academy, however only completed limited rounds with a best result of fourth place.

=== Dunlop Super2 Series ===
McLean made his Super2 Series debut with Matt Chahda Motorsport at the 2020 Bathurst 1000, the final event of the season. He finished tenth place in Race 1 of the weekend, but suffered a stuck-throttle while in eighth in Race 2 - ending his race in the wall with just one lap to go.

In 2021, McLean signed with Eggleston Motorsport for his first full season in the Super2 Series, putting the No. 54 Holden VF Commodore on the front row in the first session of the season. McLean's first three rounds consisted of finishes of fifth, sixth and fourth, claiming Rookie of the Round for the first three rounds consecutively, resulting in winning Rookie of the Year, claiming fifth outright for the 2021 Super2 Series, and winning the prestigious Mike Kable Young Gun Award.

== Career results ==
| Season | Series | Team | Races | Wins | Poles | F/laps | Podiums | Position |
|---|---|---|---|---|---|---|---|---|
| 2015 | Australian Kart Championship | Melbourne Kart Centre | 20 | 2 | 0 | 1 | 5 | 4th |
| 2016 | Australian Kart Championship | DPE Kart Technology / Arrow Karts | 25 | 3 | 1 | 5 | 13 | 1st |
| 2017 | Australian Kart Championship | DPE Kart Technology / Arrow Karts | 25 | 12 | 2 | 2 | 17 | 2nd |
| 2018 | Australian Kart Championship | DPE Kart Technology / Arrow Karts | 25 | 11 | 1 | 10 | 16 | 1st |
| 2019 | Kumho Super3 Series | Image Racing / Erebus Academy | 6 | 0 | 0 | 0 | 0 | 11th |
| 2020 | Dunlop Super2 Series | Matt Chahda Motorsport | 2 | 0 | 0 | 0 | 0 | 15th |
| 2021 | Dunlop Super2 Series | Eggleston Motorsport | 9 | 0 | 0 | 0 | 0 | 5th |

* Season still in progress

=== Super2 Series results ===
(key) (Race results only)

Super2 Series results
| Year | Team | Car | 1 | 2 | 3 | 4 | 5 | 6 | 7 | 8 | 9 | 10 | Position | Points |
|---|---|---|---|---|---|---|---|---|---|---|---|---|---|---|
| 2020 | Matt Chahda Motorsport | FG X Falcon | ADE | ADE | ADE | SYD | SYD | BAT; 10 | BAT; Ret | | | | 15th | 78 |
| 2021 | Eggleston Motorsport | VF Commodore | BAT; 6 | BAT; 5 | TOW1; 8 | TOW1; 8 | TOW2; 6 | TOW2; 6 | SMP; 10 | SMP; C | BAT; 11 | BAT; 6 | 5th | 849 |
