= 2018 Super2 Series =

Motor racing competition

The 2018 Super2 Series (known for commercial reasons as the 2018 Dunlop Super2 Series) was an Australian motor racing competition for Supercars, staged as a support series to the 2018 Supercars Championship. It was the nineteenth running of the Supercars Development Series, the second tier of competition in Supercars racing.

The series was won by Chris Pither, driving in a Garry Rogers Motorsport prepared Holden VF Commodore.

== Teams and drivers ==
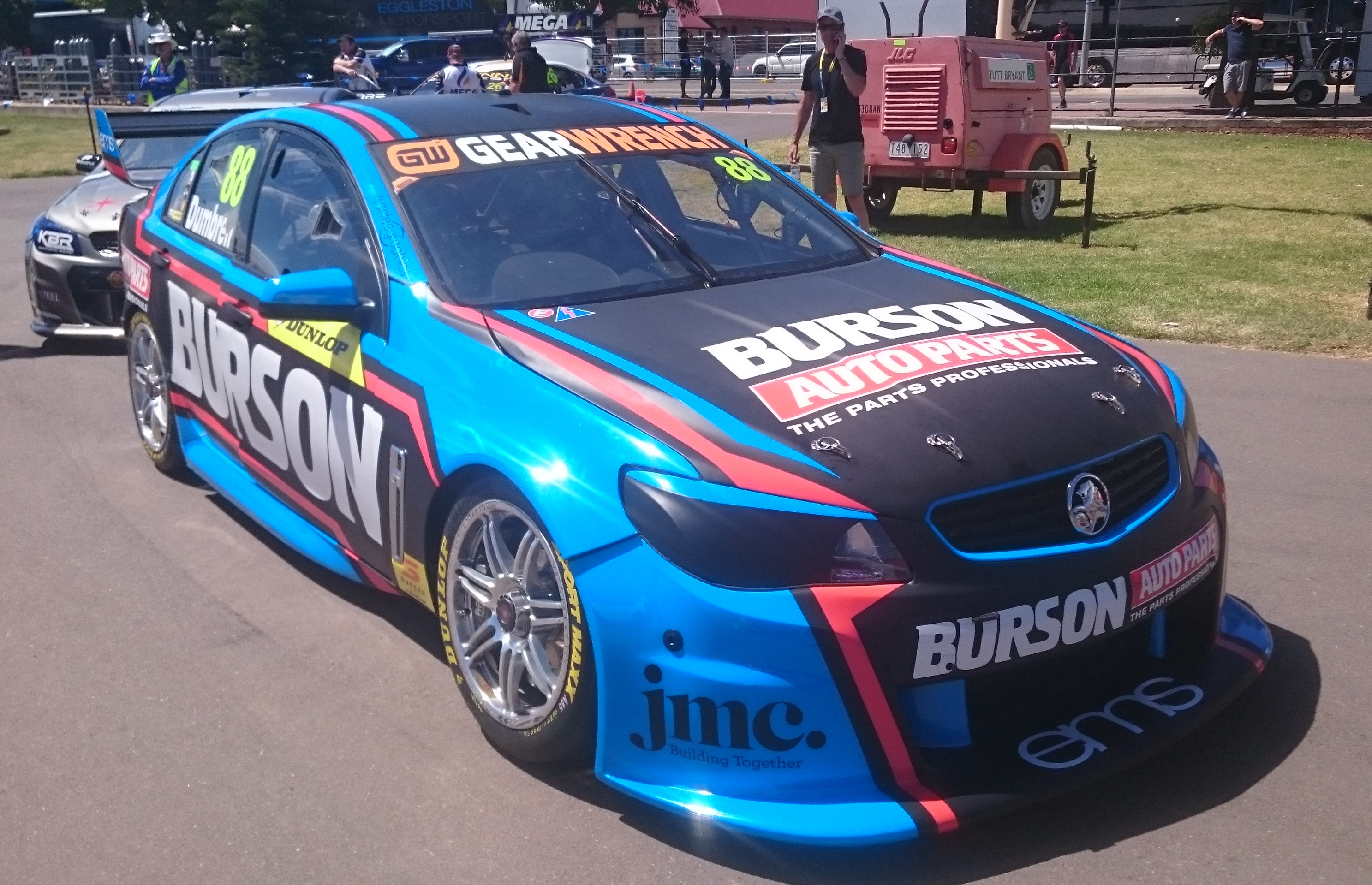
Paul Dumbrell placed second in the series driving a Holden Commodore VF for Eggleston Motorsport

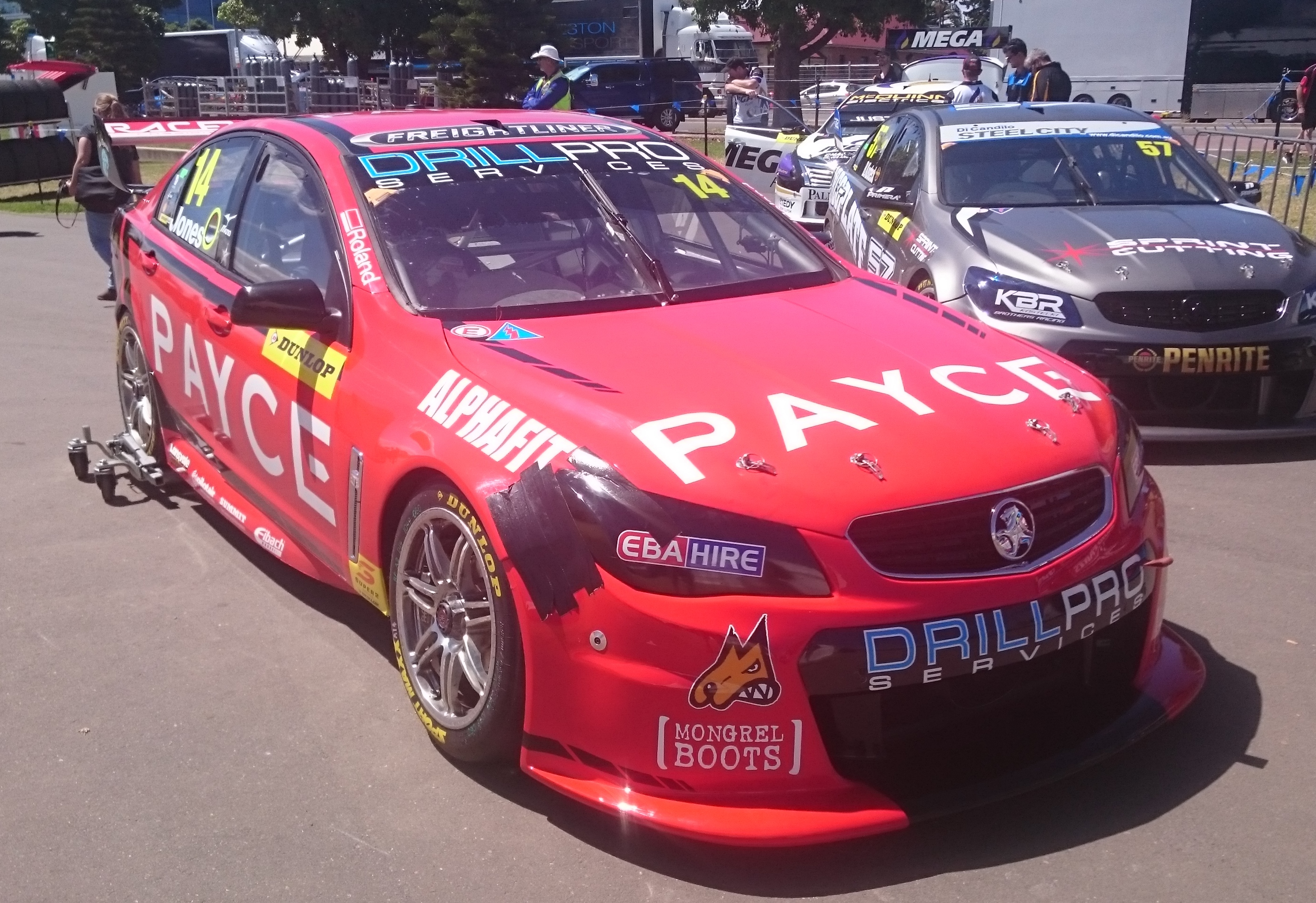
Macauley Jones placed ninth driving a Holden Commodore VF for Brad Jones Racing

The following teams and drivers competed in the series.

Manufacturer	Model	Team	Driver details			Bathurst 250 Entries
Manufacturer	Model	Team	No.	Name	Rounds	Co-Driver Name
Ford	FG X Falcon	Tickford Racing	5	(Australia) Thomas Randle	All	
Ford	FG X Falcon	Matt Stone Racing	16	(Australia) Bryce Fullwood	1–3	
Ford	FG X Falcon	Paul Morris Motorsport	67	(Australia) Shae Davies	All	
Holden	Commodore VF	Brad Jones Racing	8	(Australia) Zane Goddard	All	
Holden	Commodore VF	Brad Jones Racing	14	(Australia) Macauley Jones	All	
Holden	Commodore VF	Brad Jones Racing	21	(Australia) Jack Smith	All	
Holden	Commodore VF	Grove Racing	10	(Australia) Brenton Grove	All	(New Zealand) Earl Bamber
Holden	Commodore VF	Matt Stone Racing	13	(Australia) Tyler Greenbury	1–2	
Holden	Commodore VF	Matt Stone Racing	16	(Australia) Bryce Fullwood	4–7	
Holden	Commodore VF	Matt Stone Racing	98	(Australia) Jaie Robson	3	
Holden	Commodore VF	Image Racing	15	(Australia) Adam Marjoram	All	
Holden	Commodore VF	Image Racing	49	(Australia) Jordan Boys	All	
Holden	Commodore VF	Matt Chahda Motorsport	18	(Australia) Matt Chahda	All	
Holden	Commodore VF	Eggleston Motorsport	38	(Australia) Will Brown	All	
Holden	Commodore VF	Eggleston Motorsport	54	(Australia) Nathan Morcom	All	
Holden	Commodore VF	Eggleston Motorsport	63	(New Zealand) Dominic Storey	All	
Holden	Commodore VF	Eggleston Motorsport	88	(Australia) Paul Dumbrell	All	
Holden	Commodore VF	Garry Rogers Motorsport	44	(New Zealand) Chris Pither	All	
Holden	Commodore VF	Garry Rogers Motorsport	99	(Australia) Mason Barbera	All	
Holden	Commodore VF	Kali Motorsport	50	(Australia) Gerard McLeod	4	
Holden	Commodore VF	Kali Motorsport	50	(Australia) Ricky Capo	5	
Holden	Commodore VF	Kali Motorsport	50	(Australia) Kristian Lindbom	7	
Holden	Commodore VF	Kostecki Brothers Racing	55	(Australia) Kurt Kostecki	All	
Holden	Commodore VF	Kostecki Brothers Racing	56	(Australia) Jake Kostecki	All	
Holden	Commodore VF	Kostecki Brothers Racing	57	(Australia) Brodie Kostecki	All	
Nissan	Altima L33	MW Motorsport	23	(Australia) Dean Fiore	All	
Nissan	Altima L33	MW Motorsport	26	(Australia) Garry Jacobson	All	
Nissan	Altima L33	MW Motorsport	62	(Australia) Alex Rullo	All	

=== Team changes ===
- Eggleston Motorsport expanded to a four-car team after purchasing an extra Holden VF Commodore built by Triple Eight Race Engineering.
- Grove Racing made their series début after purchasing an ex-Triple Eight VF Commodore.
- Kostecki Brothers Racing expanded their operations to become a three-car team.

=== Driver changes ===
==== Entering/rejoining series ====
- Dean Fiore returned to full-time competition with MW Motorsport in preparation for the 2018 Enduro Cup.
- Formula 4 regular Zane Goddard made his Super2 début, replacing Andrew Jones at Brad Jones Racing.
- Tyler Greenbury, who finished runner-up in the third-tier V8 Touring Car National Series in 2017, was promoted to the Super2 Series in 2018. Greenbury raced for Matt Stone Racing.
- Brenton Grove made his series début with Grove Racing after contesting the Porsche GT3 Cup Challenge and Carrera Cup Australia in 2017.
- Chris Pither returned to the series on a full-time basis with Garry Rogers Motorsport.
- Thomas Randle returned to Australia after two years competing in Europe. Randle replaced Josh Kean at Tickford Racing.
- Alex Rullo returned to the series with MW Motorsport after entering in the Supercars series in 2017.
- Reigning Australian Endurance Championship champion Dominic Storey made his Super2 début with Eggleston Motorsport.

==== Changing teams ====
- Shae Davies moved from MW Motorsport to Paul Morris Motorsport where he replaced Anton de Pasquale.
- Bryce Fullwood moved from MW Motorsport to Matt Stone Racing.
- 2016 series champion Garry Jacobson moved from Tickford Racing to MW Motorsport.
- Brodie Kostecki left Matt Stone Racing to join his cousins Kurt and Jake Kostecki at Kostecki Brothers Racing.
- Adam Marjoram moved from Matt Stone Racing to Image Racing, replacing Jack Perkins.

==== Leaving series ====
- Anton de Pasquale, Todd Hazelwood and Jack Le Brocq left the series as they graduated to the Supercars Championship with Erebus Motorsport, Matt Stone Racing and Tekno Autosports respectively.
- Andrew Jones, Josh Kean and Matthew Palmer left the championship.
- Richard Muscat left the series to prepare for the Enduro Cup.

==== Mid-season changes ====
- Tyler Greenbury left the series after three rounds, citing sponsorship issues. He was replaced with Jaie Robson for Barbagallo.

== Calendar ==
The 2018 Dunlop Super2 Series comprised seven rounds:

Round	Event name	Circuit	Location	Date
1	Adelaide 500	(South Australia) Adelaide Street Circuit	Adelaide, South Australia	2–4 March
2	Tasmania SuperSprint	(Tasmania) Symmons Plains Raceway	Launceston, Tasmania	7–8 April
3	Perth SuperSprint	(Western Australia) Barbagallo Raceway	Neerabup, Western Australia	5–6 May
4	Townsville 400	(Queensland) Townsville Street Circuit	Townsville, Queensland	7–8 July
5	Sandown 500	(Victoria (state)) Sandown Raceway	Springvale, Victoria	15–16 September
6	Bathurst 1000	(New South Wales) Mount Panorama Circuit	Bathurst, New South Wales	6 October
7	Newcastle 500	(New South Wales) Newcastle Street Circuit	Newcastle, New South Wales	24–25 November

=== Calendar changes ===
- The Bathurst 1000 support race returned to being a points-paying series round again after the 2017 Supercheap Auto Bathurst 1000 failed to draw wildcard entries and the accompanying Super2 non-series round saw a downturn in participation from previous years.
- The category returned to Barbagallo Raceway for a series round. The round had been removed from the 2017 Super2 Series schedule to allow teams the opportunity to run wildcard entries in the Supercars Championship event, but no entries were received.
- The series no longer hosted four-race format rounds.

== Rule changes ==
=== Sporting regulations ===
The "wildcard" programme introduced in 2017 to allows teams from the Dunlop Super2 Series to compete in the Supercars Championship continued in 2018. Entries were open for the Winton, Hidden Valley, Ipswich and Tailem Bend rounds, while the Barbagallo round was discontinued.

=== Technical regulations ===
The Super2 Series no longer allowed "Project Blueprint" cars after fifteen years of use in Supercars and Super2 series. They were replaced by the "New Generation" cars first introduced to Supercars racing in 2013, bringing the Super2 Series in line with the technical regulations of its parent series. The Project Blueprint cars were eligible to compete in the V8 Touring Car National Series, the third tier of the sport.

== Results and standings ==
=== Season summary ===
Round		Event	Pole position	Fastest lap	Winning driver	Winning team	Round winner
1	1	Adelaide 500	(Australia) Garry Jacobson	(Australia) Kurt Kostecki	(Australia) Paul Dumbrell	Eggleston Motorsport	(Australia) Paul Dumbrell
1	2	Adelaide 500	(Australia) Paul Dumbrell	(Australia) Garry Jacobson	(Australia) Garry Jacobson	MW Motorsport	(Australia) Paul Dumbrell
1	3	Adelaide 500	(Australia) Garry Jacobson	(Australia) Kurt Kostecki	(Australia) Paul Dumbrell	Eggleston Motorsport	(Australia) Paul Dumbrell
2	4	Tasmania SuperSprint	(New Zealand) Chris Pither	(Australia) Paul Dumbrell	(Australia) Paul Dumbrell	Eggleston Motorsport	(New Zealand) Chris Pither
2	5	Tasmania SuperSprint	(New Zealand) Chris Pither	(New Zealand) Chris Pither	(New Zealand) Chris Pither	Garry Rogers Motorsport	(New Zealand) Chris Pither
2	6	Tasmania SuperSprint	(New Zealand) Chris Pither	(Australia) Paul Dumbrell	(Australia) Paul Dumbrell	Eggleston Motorsport	(New Zealand) Chris Pither
3	7	Perth SuperSprint	(Australia) Alex Rullo	(Australia) Alex Rullo	(Australia) Alex Rullo	MW Motorsport	(Australia) Dean Fiore
3	8	Perth SuperSprint	(Australia) Thomas Randle	(Australia) Paul Dumbrell	(Australia) Paul Dumbrell	Eggleston Motorsport	(Australia) Dean Fiore
3	9	Perth SuperSprint	(Australia) Alex Rullo	(Australia) Dean Fiore	(Australia) Dean Fiore	MW Motorsport	(Australia) Dean Fiore
4	10	Townsville 400	(Australia) Macauley Jones	(Australia) Macauley Jones	(Australia) Garry Jacobson	MW Motorsport	(Australia) Paul Dumbrell
4	11	Townsville 400	(New Zealand) Chris Pither	(Australia) Macauley Jones	(New Zealand) Chris Pither	Garry Rogers Motorsport	(Australia) Paul Dumbrell
5	12	Sandown 500	(New Zealand) Chris Pither	(Australia) Garry Jacobson	(Australia) Brodie Kostecki	Kostecki Brothers Racing	(Australia) Brodie Kostecki
5	13	Sandown 500	(Australia) Brodie Kostecki	(Australia) Garry Jacobson	(Australia) Brodie Kostecki	Kostecki Brothers Racing	(Australia) Brodie Kostecki
6	14	Bathurst 1000	(Australia) Garry Jacobson	(Australia) Garry Jacobson	(Australia) Dean Fiore	MW Motorsport	(Australia) Dean Fiore
7	15	Newcastle 500	(New Zealand) Chris Pither	(Australia) Brodie Kostecki	(Australia) Brodie Kostecki	Kostecki Brothers Racing	(Australia) Brodie Kostecki
7	16	Newcastle 500	(New Zealand) Chris Pither	race cancelled			(Australia) Brodie Kostecki

=== Points system ===
Points were awarded in each race as follows.

Round format	Position																													
Round format	1st	2nd	3rd	4th	5th	6th	7th	8th	9th	10th	11th	12th	13th	14th	15th	16th	17th	18th	19th	20th	21st	22nd	23rd	24th	25th	26th	27th	28th	29th	30th
Three races	100	92	86	80	74	68	64	60	56	52	48	46	44	42	40	38	36	34	32	30	28	26	24	22	20	18	16	14	12	10
Two races	150	138	129	120	111	102	96	90	84	78	72	69	66	63	60	57	54	51	48	45	42	39	36	33	30	27	24	21	18	15
One race	300	276	258	240	222	204	192	180	168	156	144	138	132	126	120	114	108	102	96	90	84	78	72	66	60	54	48	42	36	30

=== Series standings ===
Pos.	Driver	No.	ADE (South Australia)			SYM (Tasmania)			BAR (Western Australia)			TOW (Queensland)		SAN (Victoria (state))		BAT (New South Wales)	NEW (New South Wales)		Pen.	Points
1	(New Zealand) Chris Pither	44	6	7	7	2	1	2	7	4	7	6	1	16	3	3	2	C	0	1522
2	(Australia) Paul Dumbrell	88	1	2	1	1	5	1	14	1	2	2	2	2	2	Ret	5	C	0	1463
3	(Australia) Garry Jacobson	26	2	1	2	21	3	Ret	12	3	4	1	5	18	5	4	4	C	0	1393
4	(Australia) Alex Rullo	62	11	19	11	12	7	5	1	6	9	3	6	4	7	2	12	C	0	1328
5	(Australia) Brodie Kostecki	57	7	8	5	4	2	6	3	16	Ret	7	3	1	1	Ret	1	C	35	1202
6	(Australia) Will Brown	38	5	6	3	9	8	7	18	20	13	14	7	17	10	13	3	C	0	1068
7	(Australia) Dean Fiore	23	13	9	12	15	10	Ret	2	12	1	8	12	19	18	1	Ret	C	0	1034
8	(Australia) Kurt Kostecki	55	3	3	4	5	6	4	4	15	3	13	4	20	19	Ret	18	C	0	1010
9	(Australia) Macauley Jones	14	4	5	6	6	4	3	9	7	5	Ret	22	5	4	Ret	19	C	0	968
10	(Australia) Jack Smith	21	14	16	15	3	9	12	16	10	12	15	16	7	13	11	11	C	0	939
11	(Australia) Thomas Randle	5	Ret	DNS	DNS	10	12	8	6	2	6	4	20	3	8	8	Ret	C	35	915
12	(Australia) Shae Davies	67	8	4	Ret	Ret	11	9	8	5	16	5	8	22	12	5	Ret	C	35	912
13	(Australia) Mason Barbera	99	Ret	11	10	11	17	Ret	5	8	10	16	17	11	11	6	8	C	70	849
14	(Australia) Zane Goddard	8	16	14	17	14	22	14	15	19	14	11	9	15	16	15	6	C	0	835
15	(New Zealand) Dominic Storey	63	17	13	8	20	21	18	17	18	20	19	19	8	20	9	16	C	0	788
16	(Australia) Adam Marjoram	15	10	Ret	DNS	7	14	10	13	11	Ret	9	13	14	14	12	14	C	0	779
17	(Australia) Bryce Fullwood	16	12	10	19	17	18	15	11	13	11	12	10	10	9	Ret	13	C	0	755
18	(Australia) Jake Kostecki	56	9	Ret	9	Ret	13	17	10	9	8	10	14	6	6	Ret	9	C	70	719
19	(Australia) Nathan Morcom	54	15	20	16	8	16	Ret	19	14	17	17	18	Ret	Ret	7	10	C	0	691
20	(Australia) Matt Chahda	18	19	18	14	16	15	Ret	20	17	15	Ret	11	9	15	14	17	C	0	688
21	(Australia) Brenton Grove	10/51	Ret	17	18	18	19	16	21	21	18	Ret	21	13	21	10	20	C	0	615
22	(Australia) Jordan Boys	49	20	15	20	13	23	11	22	22	19	Ret	15	12	Ret	Ret	7	C	0	525
23	(Australia) Tyler Greenbury	13	18	12	13	19	20	13											0	230
24	(New Zealand) Earl Bamber	10														10			0	156
25	(Australia) Ricky Capo	50												21	17				0	96
26	(Australia) Kristian Lindbom	50															15	C	0	60
27	(Australia) Gerard McLeod	50										18	DNS						0	51
28	(Australia) Jaie Robson	98							23	23	Ret								0	48
Pos.	Driver	No.	ADE (South Australia)			SYM (Tasmania)			BAR (Western Australia)			TOW (Queensland)		SAN (Victoria (state))		BAT (New South Wales)	NEW (New South Wales)		Pen.	Points
