= Supercar Challenge =

Supercar Challenge or Supercars Challenge may refer to:

- Supercars Challenge (event) - The non-championship races for Supercars Championship previously held at the Australian Grand Prix
- Supercar Challenge (series) - A Benelux motor racing series formerly known as the Dutch Supercar Challenge
- Supercar Challenge (video game) - A 2009 simulation racing video game for PlayStation 3
- V8 Supercar Challenge - a former V8 Supercars event supporting the Gold Coast Indy 300
- Car and Driver Supercar Challenge, annual event held by magazine Car and Driver

== See also ==
- Bathurst 250, known from 2001 to 2004 as the Konica V8 Supercar Challenge
- Supercars Championship, Australian touring car race championship
- Supercar Street Challenge (2001 videogame)
