= 2021 Bathurst 1000 =

Motor race in Australia

(New South Wales) 2021 Repco Bathurst 1000
Event Information
- Round 12 of 12 in the 2021 Supercars Championship
- Layout of the Mount Panorama Circuit
- Date: November 30-December 5 2021
- Location: Bathurst, New South Wales
- Venue: Mount Panorama Circuit

Results
Race 1
Distance	161 laps	1000 km
Pole position	(Australia) Chaz Mostert; Walkinshaw Andretti United	2:03.3736
Winner	(Australia) Chaz Mostert (Australia) Lee Holdsworth; Walkinshaw Andretti United	06:15:06.1951

The 2021 Bathurst 1000 (known as the 2021 Repco Bathurst 1000 for commercial reasons) was a motor racing event for Supercars held on the week of 30 November to 5 December 2021. It was held at the Mount Panorama Circuit in Bathurst, New South Wales, Australia and featured a single 1000 kilometre race. The event was the final race of the 2021 Supercars Championship and the first time that Genuine Parts Company served as the naming rights sponsor.

== Report ==
=== Background ===
The event was the 64th running of the Bathurst 1000, which was first held at the Phillip Island Grand Prix Circuit in 1960 as a 500-mile race for Australian-made standard production sedans, and marks the 61st time that the race was held at Mount Panorama. It was the 25th running of the Australian 1000 race, which was first held after the organisational split between the Australian Racing Drivers Club and V8 Supercars Australia that saw two "Bathurst 1000" races contested in both 1997 and 1998.

Due to a COVID-19 outbreak in Sydney in mid-2021, the event was pushed back to December for the first time in its history. Following the cancellation of the Bathurst International event for Australian Racing Group categories (TCR, S5000, GT World Challenge Australia and TA2 Series), the event duration was extended; beginning on Tuesday November 30th to account for the extra sessions.

Shane van Gisbergen and Garth Tander were the defending race winners, they continued to race in the same car.

=== Entry list ===
Twenty-five cars entered the event - 17 Holden Commodores and eight Ford Mustangs. In addition to the 24 regular entries, a single wildcard entry was entered from Triple Eight Race Engineering, for Russell Ingall and Broc Feeney (who were, respectively, the oldest and youngest drivers on the grid). Zak Best was the only driver to make his debut in the race for Tickford Racing.

No.	Drivers	Team (Sponsors)	Car	No.	Drivers	Team (Sponsors)	Car
2	(Australia) Bryce Fullwood (Australia) Warren Luff	Walkinshaw Andretti United (Middy's Electrical)	Holden Commodore ZB	20	(Australia) Scott Pye (Australia) James Golding	Team 18 (DeWalt)	Holden Commodore ZB
3	(Australia) Tim Slade (Australia) Tim Blanchard	Blanchard Racing Team (CoolDrive)	Ford Mustang GT	22	(Australia) Garry Jacobson (Australia) Dylan O'Keeffe	Team Sydney (Muscle Car Warehouse)	Holden Commodore ZB
4	(Australia) Jack Smith (Australia) David Wall	Brad Jones Racing (SCT Logistics)	Holden Commodore ZB	25	(Australia) Chaz Mostert (Australia) Lee Holdsworth	Walkinshaw Andretti United (Appliances Online)	Holden Commodore ZB
5	(Australia) Jack Le Brocq (Australia) Zak Best	Tickford Racing (Truck Assist)	Ford Mustang GT	26	(Australia) David Reynolds (Australia) Luke Youlden	Kelly Grove Racing (Penrite)	Ford Mustang GT
6	(Australia) Cam Waters (Australia) James Moffat	Tickford Racing (Monster Energy)	Ford Mustang GT	34	(Australia) Jake Kostecki (Australia) Kurt Kostecki	Matt Stone Racing (Unit Clothing)	Holden Commodore ZB
7	(New Zealand) Andre Heimgartner (Australia) Matt Campbell	Kelly Grove Racing (Ned Whisky "Sounds of Bathurst")	Ford Mustang GT	35	(Australia) Zane Goddard (Australia) Jayden Ojeda	Matt Stone Racing (YellowCover)	Holden Commodore ZB
8	(Australia) Nick Percat (Australia) Dale Wood	Brad Jones Racing (R+J Batteries)	Holden Commodore ZB	39	(Australia) Broc Feeney (Australia) Russell Ingall	Triple Eight Race Engineering (Supercheap Auto)	Holden Commodore ZB
9	(Australia) Will Brown (Australia) Jack Perkins	Erebus Motorsport (Shaw and Partners)	Holden Commodore ZB	44	(Australia) James Courtney (Australia) Thomas Randle	Tickford Racing (Boost Mobile)	Ford Mustang GT
11	(Australia) Anton de Pasquale (Australia) Tony D'Alberto	Dick Johnson Racing (Shell V-Power)	Ford Mustang GT	88	(Australia) Jamie Whincup (Australia) Craig Lowndes	Triple Eight Race Engineering (Red Bull, Ampol)	Holden Commodore ZB
14	(Australia) Todd Hazelwood (Australia) Dean Fiore	Brad Jones Racing (Cub Cadet Lawnmowers)	Holden Commodore ZB	96	(Australia) Macauley Jones (New Zealand) Chris Pither	Brad Jones Racing (Coca-Cola No Sugar)	Holden Commodore ZB
17	(Australia) Will Davison (Australia) Alex Davison	Dick Johnson Racing (Shell V-Power)	Ford Mustang GT	99	(Australia) Brodie Kostecki (Australia) David Russell	Erebus Motorsport (Boost Mobile)	Holden Commodore ZB
18	(Australia) Mark Winterbottom (Australia) Michael Caruso	Team 18 (Irwin Tools, Bunnings)	Holden Commodore ZB	888	(New Zealand) Shane van Gisbergen (Australia) Garth Tander	Triple Eight Race Engineering (Red Bull, Ampol)	Holden Commodore ZB
19	(New Zealand) Fabian Coulthard (Australia) Jonathon Webb	Team Sydney (Local Legends Meat Snacks)	Holden Commodore ZB				

Entries with a grey background are wildcard entries which do not compete in the full championship season.

== Results ==
=== Practice ===
Session	Day	Fastest Lap						
Session	Day	No.	Driver	Team	Car	Time	Cond	Ref
Practice 1	Thursday	6	(Australia) Cam Waters	Tickford Racing	Ford Mustang GT	02:05.0233	Fine	
Practice 2	Thursday	25	(Australia) Lee Holdsworth	Walkinshaw Andretti United	Holden Commodore ZB	02:05.2258	Fine	
Practice 3	Friday	6	(Australia) Cam Waters	Tickford Racing	Ford Mustang GT	02:04.7385	Fine	
Practice 4	Friday	25	(Australia) Chaz Mostert	Walkinshaw Andretti United	Holden Commodore ZB	02:04.2084	Fine	
Practice 5	Saturday	25	(Australia) Lee Holdsworth	Walkinshaw Andretti United	Holden Commodore ZB	02:05.6421	Fine	
Practice 6	Saturday	25	(Australia) Chaz Mostert	Walkinshaw Andretti United	Holden Commodore ZB	02:04.1877	Fine	
Warm Up	Sunday	39	(Australia) Broc Feeney	Triple Eight Race Engineering	Holden Commodore ZB	02:04.9021	Fine	

=== Qualifying ===
Pos	No.	Driver	Team	Car	Time	Gap	Grid
1	9	(Australia) Will Brown	Erebus Motorsport	Holden Commodore ZB	2:03.8989		Top 10
2	11	(Australia) Anton de Pasquale	Dick Johnson Racing	Ford Mustang GT	2:03.9218	+0.0229s	Top 10
3	25	(Australia) Chaz Mostert	Walkinshaw Andretti United	Holden Commodore ZB	2:03.9770	+0.0781s	Top 10
4	3	(Australia) Tim Slade	Blanchard Racing Team	Ford Mustang GT	2:04.1540	+0.2551s	Top 10
5	6	(Australia) Cam Waters	Tickford Racing	Ford Mustang GT	2:04.2035	+0.3046s	Top 10
6	99	(Australia) Brodie Kostecki	Erebus Motorsport	Holden Commodore ZB	2:04.2201	+0.3212s	Top 10
7	888	(New Zealand) Shane van Gisbergen	Triple Eight Race Engineering	Holden Commodore ZB	2:04.2278	+0.3289s	Top 10
8	17	(Australia) Will Davison	Dick Johnson Racing	Ford Mustang GT	2:04.3078	+0.4089s	Top 10
9	8	(Australia) Nick Percat	Brad Jones Racing	Holden Commodore ZB	2:04.3078	+0.5432s	Top 10
10	5	(Australia) Jack Le Brocq	Tickford Racing	Ford Mustang GT	2:04.4933	+0.5944s	Top 10
11	88	(Australia) Jamie Whincup	Triple Eight Race Engineering	Holden Commodore ZB	2:04.5158	+0.6169s	11
12	2	(Australia) Bryce Fullwood	Walkinshaw Andretti United	Holden Commodore ZB	2:04.5555	+0.6566s	12
13	20	(Australia) Scott Pye	Team 18	Holden Commodore ZB	2:04.7273	+0.8284s	13
14	18	(Australia) Mark Winterbottom	Team 18	Holden Commodore ZB	2:04.7927	+0.8938s	14
15	39	(Australia) Broc Feeney	Triple Eight Race Engineering	Holden Commodore ZB	2:04.8273	+0.9284s	15
16	44	(Australia) James Courtney	Tickford Racing	Ford Mustang GT	2:04.9024	+1.0035s	16
17	7	(New Zealand) Andre Heimgartner	Kelly Grove Racing	Ford Mustang GT	2:04.9394	+1.0405s	17
18	14	(Australia) Todd Hazelwood	Brad Jones Racing	Holden Commodore ZB	2:04.9698	+1.0709s	18
19	26	(Australia) David Reynolds	Kelly Grove Racing	Ford Mustang GT	2:05.0818	+1.1829s	19
20	19	(New Zealand) Fabian Coulthard	Team Sydney	Holden Commodore ZB	2:05.1458	+1.2469s	20
21	34	(Australia) Jake Kostecki	Matt Stone Racing	Holden Commodore ZB	2:05.3350	+1.4361s	21
22	96	(Australia) Macauley Jones	Brad Jones Racing	Holden Commodore ZB	2:05.5207	+1.6218s	22
23	35	(Australia) Zane Goddard	Matt Stone Racing	Holden Commodore ZB	2:05.6649	+1.7660s	23
24	4	(Australia) Jack Smith	Brad Jones Racing	Holden Commodore ZB	2:05.8671	+1.9682s	24
25	22	(Australia) Garry Jacobson	Team Sydney	Holden Commodore ZB	2:05.9305	+2.0316s	25

=== Top Ten Shootout ===
Pos	No.	Driver	Team	Car	Time	Gap	Grid
1	25	(Australia) Chaz Mostert	Walkinshaw Andretti United	Holden Commodore ZB	2:03.3736		1
2	11	(Australia) Anton de Pasquale	Dick Johnson Racing	Ford Mustang GT	2:03.6634	+0.2898s	2
3	6	(Australia) Cam Waters	Tickford Racing	Ford Mustang GT	2:03.6864	+0.3128s	3
4	3	(Australia) Tim Slade	Blanchard Racing Team	Ford Mustang GT	2:04.0507	+0.6772s	4
5	888	(New Zealand) Shane van Gisbergen	Triple Eight Race Engineering	Holden Commodore ZB	2:04.3648	+0.9912s	5
6	17	(Australia) Will Davison	Dick Johnson Racing	Ford Mustang GT	2:04.7787	+1.4051s	6
7	8	(Australia) Nick Percat	Brad Jones Racing	Holden Commodore ZB	2:04.8988	+1.5252s	7
8	5	(Australia) Jack Le Brocq	Tickford Racing	Ford Mustang GT	2:04.5331	+1.9577s	8
DSQ (Note: Will Brown was to start 5th on the grid but was stripped of the position due to the doors being underweight)	9	(Australia) Will Brown	Erebus Motorsport	Holden Commodore ZB	2:03.9921	+ . s	9
DSQ (Note: Brodie Kostecki was to start 4th on the grid but was stripped of the position due to the doors being underweight)	99	(Australia) Brodie Kostecki	Erebus Motorsport	Holden Commodore ZB	2:03.7733	+ . s	10

=== Grid ===
Inside row			Outside row		
1	(Australia) Chaz Mostert (Australia) Lee Holdsworth	25	11	(Australia) Anton de Pasquale (Australia) Tony D'Alberto	2
1	Walkinshaw Andretti United (Holden Commodore ZB)		Dick Johnson Racing (Ford Mustang GT)		2
3	(Australia) Cam Waters (Australia) James Moffat	6	3	(Australia) Tim Slade (Australia) Tim Blanchard	4
3	Tickford Racing (Ford Mustang GT)		Blanchard Racing Team (Ford Mustang GT)		4
5	(New Zealand) Shane van Gisbergen (Australia) Garth Tander	888	17	(Australia) Will Davison (Australia) Alex Davison	6
5	Triple Eight Race Engineering (Holden Commodore ZB)		Dick Johnson Racing (Ford Mustang GT)		6
7	(Australia) Nick Percat (Australia) Dale Wood	8	5	(Australia) Jack Le Brocq (Australia) Zak Best	8
7	Brad Jones Racing (Holden Commodore ZB)		Tickford Racing (Ford Mustang GT)		8
9	(Australia) Will Brown (Australia) Jack Perkins	9	99	(Australia) Brodie Kostecki (Australia) David Russell	10
9	Erebus Motorsport (Holden Commodore ZB)		Erebus Motorsport (Holden Commodore ZB)		10
11	(Australia) Jamie Whincup (Australia) Craig Lowndes	88	2	(Australia) Bryce Fullwood (Australia) Warren Luff	12
11	Triple Eight Race Engineering (Holden Commodore ZB)		Walkinshaw Andretti United (Holden Commodore ZB)		12
13	(Australia) Scott Pye (Australia) James Golding	20	18	(Australia) Mark Winterbottom (Australia) Michael Caruso	14
13	Team 18 (Holden Commodore ZB)		Team 18 (Holden Commodore ZB)		14
15	(Australia) Broc Feeney (Australia) Russell Ingall	39	44	(Australia) James Courtney (Australia) Thomas Randle	16
15	Triple Eight Race Engineering (Holden Commodore ZB)		Tickford Racing (Ford Mustang GT)		16
17	(New Zealand) Andre Heimgartner (Australia) Matt Campbell	7	14	(Australia) Todd Hazelwood (Australia) Dean Fiore	18
17	Kelly Grove Racing (Ford Mustang GT)		Brad Jones Racing (Holden Commodore ZB)		18
19	(Australia) David Reynolds (Australia) Luke Youlden	26	19	(New Zealand) Fabian Coulthard (Australia) Jonathon Webb	20
19	Kelly Grove Racing (Ford Mustang GT)		Team Sydney (Holden Commodore ZB)		20
21	(Australia) Jake Kostecki (Australia) Kurt Kostecki	34	96	(Australia) Macauley Jones (New Zealand) Chris Pither	22
21	Matt Stone Racing (Holden Commodore ZB)		Brad Jones Racing (Holden Commodore ZB)		22
23	(Australia) Zane Goddard (Australia) Jayden Ojeda	35	4	(Australia) Jack Smith (Australia) David Wall	24
23	Matt Stone Racing (Holden Commodore ZB)		Brad Jones Racing (Holden Commodore ZB)		24
25	(Australia) Garry Jacobson (Australia) Dylan O'Keeffe	22			
25	Team Sydney (Holden Commodore ZB)				

=== Race ===
Pos	No.	Drivers	Team	Car	Laps	Time	Grid	Points
1	25	(Australia) Chaz Mostert (Australia) Lee Holdsworth	Walkinshaw Andretti United	Holden Commodore ZB	161	6:15:06.1951	1	300
2	6	(Australia) Cam Waters (Australia) James Moffat	Tickford Racing	Ford Mustang Mk.6	161	+3.7395	3	276
3	99	(Australia) Brodie Kostecki (Australia) David Russell	Erebus Motorsport	Holden Commodore ZB	161	+6.1448	10	258
4	88	(Australia) Jamie Whincup (Australia) Craig Lowndes	Triple Eight Race Engineering	Holden Commodore ZB	161	+7.3448	11	240
5	2	(Australia) Bryce Fullwood (Australia) Warren Luff	Walkinshaw Andretti United	Holden Commodore ZB	161	+10.4073	12	222
6	8	(Australia) Nick Percat (Australia) Dale Wood	Brad Jones Racing	Holden Commodore ZB	161	+13.2740	7	204
7	44	(Australia) James Courtney (Australia) Thomas Randle	Tickford Racing	Ford Mustang Mk.6	161	+14.5753	16	192
8	14	(Australia) Todd Hazelwood (Australia) Dean Fiore	Brad Jones Racing	Holden Commodore ZB	161	+16.4182	18	180
9	3	(Australia) Tim Slade (Australia) Tim Blanchard	Blanchard Racing Team	Ford Mustang Mk.6	161	+16.9603	4	168
10	17	(Australia) Will Davison (Australia) Alex Davison	Dick Johnson Racing	Ford Mustang Mk.6	161	+17.5201	6	156
11	26	(Australia) David Reynolds (Australia) Luke Youlden	Kelly Grove Racing	Ford Mustang Mk.6	161	+22.8753	19	144
12	96	(Australia) Macauley Jones (New Zealand) Chris Pither	Brad Jones Racing	Holden Commodore ZB	161	+24.9126	22	138
13	34	(Australia) Jake Kostecki (Australia) Kurt Kostecki	Matt Stone Racing	Holden Commodore ZB	161	+26.0605	21	132
14	22	(Australia) Garry Jacobson (Australia) Dylan O'Keeffe	Team Sydney	Holden Commodore ZB	161	+27.3676	25	126
15	5	(Australia) Jack Le Brocq (Australia) Zak Best	Tickford Racing	Ford Mustang Mk.6	161	+31.8084	8	120
16	18	(Australia) Mark Winterbottom (Australia) Michael Caruso	Team 18	Holden Commodore ZB	161	+35.9615	14	114
17	4	(Australia) Jack Smith (Australia) David Wall	Brad Jones Racing	Holden Commodore ZB	161	+39.8953	23	108
18	888	(New Zealand) Shane van Gisbergen (Australia) Garth Tander	Triple Eight Race Engineering	Holden Commodore ZB	161	+1:06.1673	7	102
19	19	(New Zealand) Fabian Coulthard (Australia) Jonathon Webb	Team Sydney	Holden Commodore ZB	156	+5 Laps	20	96
20	9	(Australia) Will Brown (Australia) Jack Perkins	Erebus Motorsport	Holden Commodore ZB	150	+11 Laps	9	90
NC	7	(New Zealand) Andre Heimgartner (Australia) Matt Campbell	Kelly Grove Racing	Ford Mustang Mk.6	159	Lap-time limit	17	0
Ret	39	(Australia) Broc Feeney (Australia) Russell Ingall	Triple Eight Race Engineering	Holden Commodore ZB	142	Accident	15	0
Ret	11	(Australia) Anton de Pasquale (Australia) Tony D'Alberto	Dick Johnson Racing	Ford Mustang Mk.6	139	Driveline	2	0
Ret	35	(Australia) Zane Goddard (Australia) Jayden Ojeda	Matt Stone Racing	Holden Commodore ZB	113	Accident	23	0
Ret	20	(Australia) Scott Pye (Australia) James Golding	Team 18	Holden Commodore ZB	6	Power steering	13	0

== Broadcast ==
The event telecast was produced by Supercars Media and carried domestically by Fox Sports Australia (via Fox Sports 506 and Kayo Sports), a paid service which covered all sessions including support categories, and the Seven Network (via free-to-air channels 7HD and 7mate, as well as streaming on 7plus), which covered select sessions from midday Friday onwards. Prior to the start of the season, the Seven Network had regained the rights to broadcast select rounds free-to-air for the first time since 2014 as part of a five-year deal. In New Zealand the sessions were shown by paid service Sky Sport, whilst internationally the broadcast was available through the series' pay-per-view service SuperView.

Fox Sports	Seven Network
Host: Jessica Yates; Booth: Neil Crompton, Mark Skaife; Pit-lane: Mark Larkham, Chad Neylon, Charli Robinson, Greg Rust; Supports: Richard Craill, Matt Naulty, Chad Neylon	Presenters: Mark Beretta, Abbey Gelmi; Pundit: Jack Perkins; Roving: Emma Freedman, Chris Stubbs Brad Hodge
