= 2019 Bathurst 1000 =

Motor race in Australia

(New South Wales) 2019 Supercheap Auto Bathurst 1000
Event Information
- Round 11 of 14 in the 2019 Supercars Championship
- Layout of the Mount Panorama Circuit
- Date: 10–13 October 2019
- Location: Bathurst, New South Wales
- Venue: Mount Panorama Circuit
- Weather: Fine early before patchy cloud developed late

Results
Race 1
Distance	161 laps	1000 km
Pole position	(Australia) Chaz Mostert; Tickford Racing	2:03.7897
Winner	(New Zealand) Scott McLaughlin (France) Alexandre Prémat; DJR Team Penske	6:27:51.5260

The 2019 Bathurst 1000 (formally known as the 2019 Supercheap Auto Bathurst 1000) was a motor racing event for Supercars which was held on the weekend of 10–13 October 2019. It was held at the Mount Panorama Circuit in Bathurst, New South Wales, Australia and featured a single 1000 kilometre race. The event was the eleventh of fourteen in the 2019 Supercars Championship and incorporated Race 25 of the series. It was also the opening round of the 2019 Enduro Cup.

DJR Team Penske drivers Scott McLaughlin and Alexandre Prémat won the race from pole position, marking their first Bathurst 1000 win. It was also the first time Dick Johnson Racing—which merged with Team Penske in 2015— had won the race since 1994. The Triple Eight Race Engineering pair of Shane van Gisbergen and Garth Tander finished second, with Walkinshaw Andretti United's James Courtney and Jack Perkins completing the podium in third.

== Report ==
=== Background ===
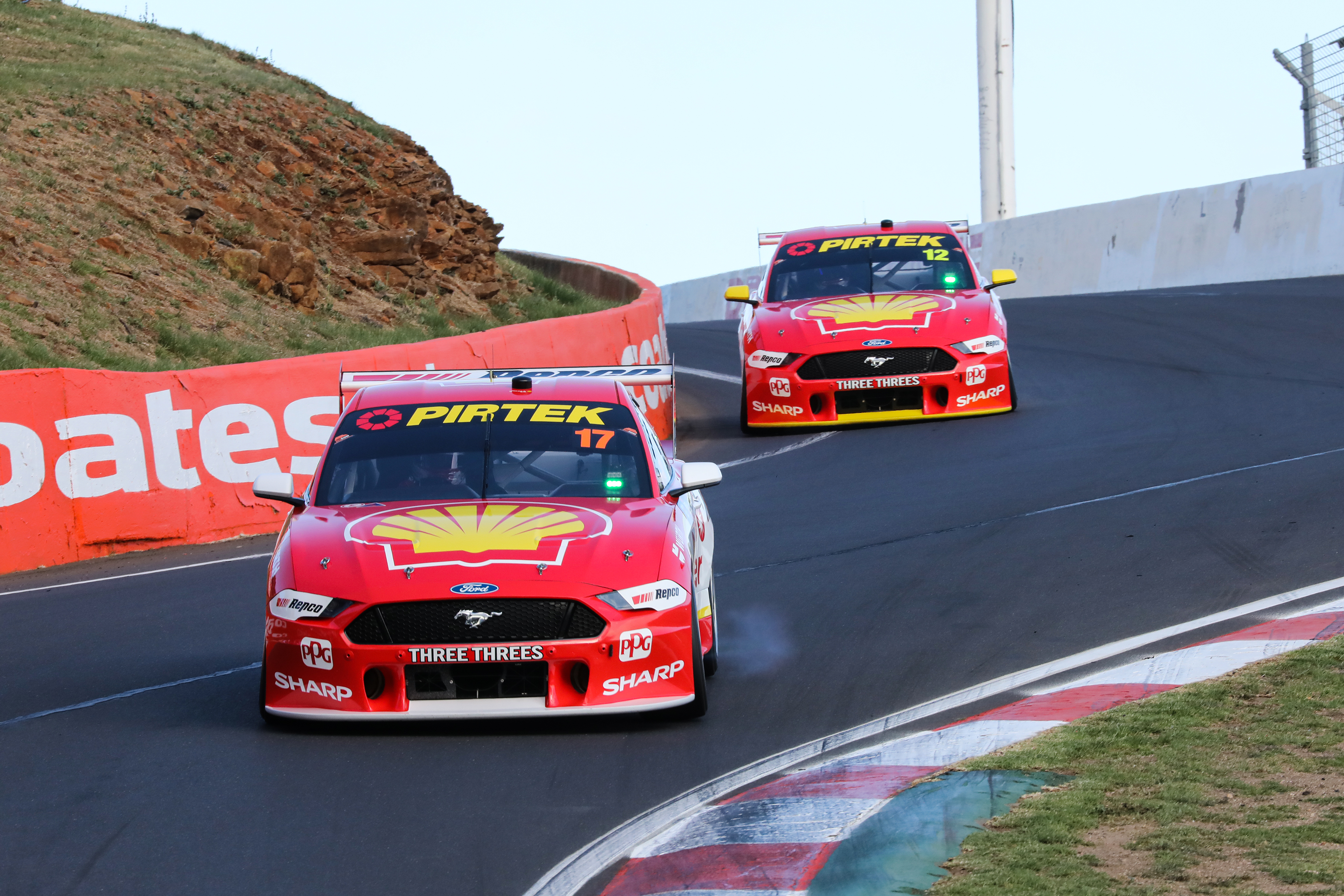
The race winning Ford Mustang GT, pictured during Practice 4

The event was the 62nd running of the Bathurst 1000, which was first held at the Phillip Island Grand Prix Circuit in 1960 as a 500-mile race for Australian-made standard production sedans, and marks the 59th time that the race was held at Mount Panorama. It was the 23rd running of the Australian 1000 race, which was first held after the organisational split between the Australian Racing Drivers Club and V8 Supercars Australia that saw two "Bathurst 1000" races contested in both 1997 and 1998. It was scheduled as the 21st race held as part of the Supercars Championship and the seventh time it forms part of the Enduro Cup. The defending winners of the race are Craig Lowndes and Steven Richards, who are competing with Jamie Whincup and Mark Winterbottom in 2019 respectively.

Scott McLaughlin lead the Drivers' Championship leading into the event, leading second-placed Shane van Gisbergen by just under two events' worth of points. Chaz Mostert sits in third ahead of McLaughlin's DJR Team Penske team-mate Fabian Coulthard. In the Teams' Championship, DJR Team Penske hold an 855-point lead over Triple Eight Race Engineering.

=== Entry list ===
Twenty-six cars were entered in the event – 16 Holden Commodores, 6 Ford Mustangs and 4 Nissan Altimas. In addition to the 24 regular-season entries, there were two 'Wildcards' – one for Super2 Series team Kostecki Brothers Racing with cousins Jake and Brodie Kostecki, and another from Walkinshaw Andretti United for IndyCar drivers Alexander Rossi and James Hinchcliffe. A third wildcard from Team Kiwi Racing, who last appeared in 2008, was also announced, featuring Chris van der Drift and Jaxon Evans as drivers – however this failed to materialise. Six drivers made their debut in the race; all four 'Wildcard' drivers, as well as Super2 Series competitors Thomas Randle and Jack Smith. It was the last start for five-time winner Steven Richards.

No.	Drivers	Team (Sponsor)	Car	No.	Drivers	Team (Sponsor)	Car
2	(Australia) Scott Pye (Australia) Warren Luff	Walkinshaw Andretti United (Winning Appliances)	Holden Commodore ZB	21	(Australia) Macauley Jones (Australia) Dean Canto	Tim Blanchard Racing (CoolDrive)	Holden Commodore ZB
3	(Australia) Garry Jacobson (Australia) Dean Fiore	Kelly Racing (Rabble Club)	Nissan Altima L33	22	(Australia) James Courtney (Australia) Jack Perkins	Walkinshaw Andretti United (Appliances Online)	Holden Commodore ZB
5	(Australia) Lee Holdsworth (Australia) Thomas Randle	Tickford Racing (The Bottle-O, Southern Comfort)	Ford Mustang GT	23	(Australia) Will Davison (Australia) Alex Davison	23Red Racing (Milwaukee Tools)	Ford Mustang GT
6	(Australia) Cam Waters (Australia) Michael Caruso	Tickford Racing (Monster Energy)	Ford Mustang GT	27	(United States) Alexander Rossi (Canada) James Hinchcliffe	Walkinshaw Andretti United (NAPA Auto Parts, Virgin Australia)	Holden Commodore ZB
7	(New Zealand) Andre Heimgartner (Australia) Bryce Fullwood	Kelly Racing (Plus Fitness)	Nissan Altima L33	33	(New Zealand) Richie Stanaway (New Zealand) Chris Pither	Garry Rogers Motorsport (Boost Mobile)	Holden Commodore ZB
8	(Australia) Nick Percat (Australia) Tim Blanchard	Brad Jones Racing (Mobil 1)	Holden Commodore ZB	34	(Australia) James Golding (Australia) Richard Muscat	Garry Rogers Motorsport (Boost Mobile)	Holden Commodore ZB
9	(Australia) David Reynolds (Australia) Luke Youlden	Erebus Motorsport (Penrite)	Holden Commodore ZB	35	(Australia) Todd Hazelwood (Australia) Jack Smith	Matt Stone Racing (SP Tools)	Holden Commodore ZB
12	(New Zealand) Fabian Coulthard (Australia) Tony D'Alberto	DJR Team Penske (Shell V-Power)	Ford Mustang GT	55	(Australia) Chaz Mostert (Australia) James Moffat	Tickford Racing (Supercheap Auto)	Ford Mustang GT
14	(Australia) Tim Slade (Australia) Ashley Walsh	Brad Jones Racing (Freightliner, Alliance Truck Parts)	Holden Commodore ZB	56	(Australia) Brodie Kostecki (Australia) Jake Kostecki	Kostecki Brothers Racing (Boost Mobile, Arcoweld)	Holden Commodore ZB
15	(Australia) Rick Kelly (Australia) Dale Wood	Kelly Racing (Castrol)	Nissan Altima L33	78	(Switzerland) Simona de Silvestro (Australia) Alex Rullo	Kelly Racing (Harvey Norman)	Nissan Altima L33
17	(New Zealand) Scott McLaughlin (France) Alexandre Prémat	DJR Team Penske (Shell V-Power)	Ford Mustang GT	97	(New Zealand) Shane van Gisbergen (Australia) Garth Tander	Triple Eight Race Engineering (Red Bull, Holden)	Holden Commodore ZB
18	(Australia) Mark Winterbottom (New Zealand) Steven Richards	Team 18 (Irwin Tools)	Holden Commodore ZB	99	(Australia) Anton de Pasquale (Australia) Will Brown	Erebus Motorsport (Penrite)	Holden Commodore ZB
19	(Australia) Jack Le Brocq (Australia) Jonathon Webb	Tekno Autosports (Truck Assist)	Holden Commodore ZB	888	(Australia) Jamie Whincup (Australia) Craig Lowndes	Triple Eight Race Engineering (Red Bull, Holden)	Holden Commodore ZB

Entries with a grey background are wildcard entries which do not compete in the full championship season.

=== Summary ===
==== Thursday and Friday practice ====
Jamie Whincup topped the opening session with the fastest time for an opening session in Bathurst 1000 history. Macauley Jones had the first incident of the weekend, and the only one of the session, backing his Holden Commodore ZB into the wall at the Cutting. As well as doing damage to the rear bumper and chassis rail, the impact bizarrely popped the rivets out of the roof, which subsequently folded back on the car as the Tim Blanchard Racing driver stopped at Reid Park.

The first co-driver session was smattered with incidents, starting with multiple drivers running through the grass at the Chase. Twenty minutes into the session, the Mountain claimed its first major scalp with Luke Youlden hitting the wall at Sulman Park and ripping the front-right suspension out of the car, resigning it to the garage for the rest of the day. Jake Kostecki in the Kostecki Brothers Racing wildcard would make the same error at the end of the session, with Ashley Walsh bringing out the only other red flag of the session having locked up and run into the sandtrap at Murray's Corner. Jack Smith had a baptism of fire, brushing the tyre wall at Griffin's Bend in the Matt Stone Racing entry fifteen minutes in. James Moffat overtook DJR Team Penske's Alexandre Prémat in the dying seconds to set the fastest time in the GT Mustang.

Thursday's running ended with an incident-free third session, as championship leader McLaughlin broke his own Top Ten Shootout record by a tenth of a second on the first day of practice. The damaged #9 and #56 Commodores sat out the session, and all six Mustangs finished inside the top seven positions – the top six covered by less than three-tenths of a second.

Friday began with a co-driver session, topped by Will Brown in the second Erebus Motorsport Commodore. The session was stopped a matter of seconds after it began with Jake Kostecki running straight into the fence at Griffins' Bend after a steering rack stop was left in the car, for which the team received an AU$5,000 fine. Debutant Thomas Randle ran wide at Forrest's Elbow and lightly brushed the outside wall, but did not bring out the red flags. Garth Tander in Shane van Gisbergen's Triple Eight Race Engineering Commodore also ran wide at the first corner, nearly rejoining into the path of Moffat.

The final practice session before qualifying saw another big-name driver in strife, with Whincup crashing at the Esses in an attempt to avoid the already stranded Richie Stanaway. Elsewhere it was a struggle for the international drivers, as both Simona de Silvestro and Alexander Rossi found the sandtrap at Hell Corner in separate incidents. McLaughlin once again lowered the lap record by 0.3sec, with Andre Heimgartner producing the first sub 2:04 time for a Nissan Altima to finish second.

==== Provisional qualifying ====
The weather turned against crews ahead of the forty-minute qualifying session, and the circuit remained wet throughout. McLaughlin and Chaz Mostert traded fastest times, with the New Zealander ending the session on top. Van Gisbergen finished the session third ahead of Will Davison, with both Brad Jones Racing entries of Tim Slade and Nick Percat also making the ten. Having struggled for the majority of the session, Whincup put in a late time to elevate him to 7th from 23rd – whilst 8th placed Cam Waters also had an interrupted session having spent most of it in the garage with an engine sensor issue. Rounding out the top-ten would be Mark Winterbottom and Anton de Pasquale, with the latter's team-mate and 2018 pole-sitter David Reynolds finishing the session 22nd. Another big name to struggle was Fabian Coulthard; the DJR Team Penske driver finishing 16th. Both 'Wildcard' entries ended the session down the back, with Brodie Kostecki beating Alexander Rossi to 24th by 0.03sec. Rounding out the field was Jack Le Brocq of Tekno Autosports, struggling heavily with the wet conditions.

==== Saturday practice ====
Saturday begun under grey skies. Will Davison set an early benchmark that would not be beaten, with only two other drivers setting a time under 2:05. The session stayed green throughout, however late in the piece James Hinchcliffe lost the rear of his Walkinshaw Andretti United Commodore on the exit of the Cutting and dragged the right-rear corner along the wall. All teams except DJR Team Penske elected to run both main and co-drivers in the session, Prémat proving the exception in the #17 Mustang. The Waters/Caruso entry continued to be plagued with mechanical issues; a stuck throttle leaving them on the sidelines for the early running.

==== Top Ten Shootout ====
The field went out in reverse order from qualifying, with De Pasquale setting the benchmark of 2:04.3. Mark Winterbottom went out next, with lock-ups at the Cutting and Forrest's Elbow leaving him six-tenths down on the Erebus driver. Cam Waters moved to provisional pole with the first sub 2:04 of the session despite a moment at Sulman Park, before Jamie Whincup's attempt left him 0.03sec shy of the #6. The Brad Jones Racing pair did not challenge the top order, surpassing only Winterbottom with Percat ahead of Slade. Will Davison dropped in behind Whincup having felt he did not maximise his run, and Van Gisbergen dropped between the pair. Chaz Mostert, the penultimate runner, bettered Waters' time by a tenth – but McLaughlin proved unbeatable, beating Mostert's benchmark by four-tenths to claim his second pole position at the Bathurst 1000, and fifteenth of the 2019 championship.

==== Race ====
The race start was delayed as Brodie Kostecki stopped the Kostecki Brothers Racing wildcard entry at the exit of Forrest's Elbow on the original warm-up lap, complaining of breathing difficulties. The teams' Commodore ZB was towed back to the pits where it was discovered Kostecki's helmet fan was blowing dry ice from the drivers' cool box into his face and causing carbon monoxide poisoning. Brodie's cousin Jake jumped in the car to restart the race from the pit-lane, with Jake's older brother Kurt on standby should Brodie be ruled unfit to continue.

McLaughlin got the jump on Mostert heading into Hell Corner on the opening lap, with Michael Caruso slipping past his Tickford team-mate into second. As the field climbed the mountain for the first time, Tim Slade found himself on the wrong end of a mid-field battle with Scott Pye – a slight bump at Quarry Corner (Turn 5) sending the Brad Jones Racing Commodore into the outside wall and bringing out the safety car.

A safety car was deployed on Lap 135 in response to the stricken Commodore of Hinchcliffe and Rossi, which caused Coulthard, who was third at the time, to dramatically slow down the rest of the field. This happened as McLaughin and Whincup, who were first and second at the time respectively, headed into the pits. During this time the gap between Whincup and Coulthard, which was originally three seconds, extended out to over forty seconds. This caused a shuffle in positions, with several teams being better off, while others were worse off. Initially Coulthard was given a drive-through penalty for breaching safety car procedures, but when Ryan Story, Team Principal of DJR Team Penske, was interviewed about the issues, questions were raised that it was done by team orders.

==== Post race ====
The actions of DJR Team Penske during the Lap 135 safety car received mixed reception from team owners and drivers. Race runner-up Van Gisbergen described Coulthard as a "sacrificial lamb" and added that it was "pretty obvious" as to what had happened. Erebus Motorsport boss Barry Ryan claimed that DJR Team Penske had "blatantly cheated" and wanted points from the team stripped. Walkinshaw Andretti United's James Courtney, who finished third alongside Jack Perkins defended the team, stating that penalising the drivers would be "unfair" and stating that stripping McLaughlin of his maiden win would be "pretty harsh". McLaughlin, team-mate to Coulthard, was initially unfazed about the incident, but then lashed out at fans after it was revealed that Coulthard had received death threats after the incident.

DJR Team Penske were later charged for breach of team orders and had a hearing on 19 October. They were later found guilty and were fined $250,000, $100,000 suspended until 31 December 2021 and 300 points stripped from the teams' championship. Fabian Coulthard and Tony D'Alberto were both relegated to twenty-first position, the last running position, while Scott McLaughlin and Alex Prémat kept their first place. McLaughlin and Prémat were not penalised because the stewards' investigation found that the team's orders were intended to benefit Coulthard and D'Alberto; by slowing the field down, the team hoped that Coulthard would keep his position as continuing to the pits at race speed would mean an extended stop waiting behind McLaughlin.

Furthermore, on the 10 November, DJR Team Penske were fined $30,000 and Scott McLaughlin's pole time was stripped, after it was found that the valve lift in a number of cylinders had exceeded the maximum permitted valve lift prescribed by the ESD. The stewards ruled that this did not offer McLaughlin a performance advantage and the violation was so slight that the team could not have been aware of it. The team accepted the penalty, attributing the issue to improperly-calibrated machinery being used in assembling the engine. The penalty carried a flow-on effect to Race 30 at Sandown, which saw McLaughlin relegated to last position on the grid. McLaughlin retained his race win as the engine used in qualifying was replaced ahead of the race.

== Results ==
=== Practice ===
Practice summary
Session	Day	Fastest lap						
Session	Day	No.	Driver	Team	Car	Time	Cond.	Ref.
Practice 1	Thursday	888	(Australia) Jamie Whincup	Triple Eight Race Engineering	Holden Commodore ZB	2:04.6744	Dry	
Practice 2	Thursday	55	(Australia) James Moffat	Tickford Racing	Ford Mustang GT	2:05.6619	Dry	
Practice 3	Thursday	17	(New Zealand) Scott McLaughlin	DJR Team Penske	Ford Mustang GT	2:03.7728	Dry	
Practice 4	Friday	99	(Australia) Will Brown	Erebus Motorsport	Holden Commodore ZB	2:04.9817	Dry	
Practice 5	Friday	17	(New Zealand) Scott McLaughlin	DJR Team Penske	Ford Mustang GT	2:03.4813	Dry	
Practice 6	Saturday	23	(Australia) Will Davison	23Red Racing	Ford Mustang GT	2:04.7545	Dry	
Practice 7	Saturday	55	(Australia) Chaz Mostert	Tickford Racing	Ford Mustang GT	2:03.5089	Dry	

=== Qualifying ===
Pos.	No.	Driver	Team	Car	Time	Gap	Grid (Note: Starting grid position)
DSQ (Note: Scott McLaughlin was quickest, but was retrospectively stripped of the position on 10 November 2019, due to an engine infringement.)	17	(New Zealand) Scott McLaughlin	DJR Team Penske	Ford Mustang GT	2:27.6476		Top 10 (Note: Grid position determined by Top 10 Shootout)
1	55	(Australia) Chaz Mostert	Tickford Racing	Ford Mustang GT	2:28.0484	+0.4008	Top 10
2	97	(New Zealand) Shane van Gisbergen	Triple Eight Race Engineering	Holden Commodore ZB	2:29.1880	+1.5404	Top 10
3	23	(Australia) Will Davison	23Red Racing	Ford Mustang GT	2:29.2431	+1.5955	Top 10
4	14	(Australia) Tim Slade	Brad Jones Racing	Holden Commodore ZB	2:29.3889	+1.7413	Top 10
5	8	(Australia) Nick Percat	Brad Jones Racing	Holden Commodore ZB	2:29.4619	+1.8143	Top 10
6	888	(Australia) Jamie Whincup	Triple Eight Race Engineering	Holden Commodore ZB	2:29.6973	+2.0497	Top 10
7	6	(Australia) Cam Waters	Tickford Racing	Ford Mustang GT	2:29.7038	+2.0562	Top 10
8	18	(Australia) Mark Winterbottom	Team 18	Holden Commodore ZB	2:29.8025	+2.1549	Top 10
9	99	(Australia) Anton de Pasquale	Erebus Motorsport	Holden Commodore ZB	2:29.8288	+2.1812	Top 10
10	15	(Australia) Rick Kelly	Kelly Racing	Nissan Altima L33	2:29.8573	+2.2097	11
11	33	(New Zealand) Richie Stanaway	Garry Rogers Motorsport	Holden Commodore ZB	2:29.9048	+2.2572	12
12	7	(New Zealand) Andre Heimgartner	Kelly Racing	Nissan Altima L33	2:30.1249	+2.4773	13
13	2	(Australia) Scott Pye	Walkinshaw Andretti United	Holden Commodore ZB	2:30.1690	+2.5214	14
14	35	(Australia) Todd Hazelwood	Matt Stone Racing	Holden Commodore ZB	2:30.2670	+2.6194	15
15	12	(New Zealand) Fabian Coulthard	DJR Team Penske	Ford Mustang GT	2:30.2983	+2.6507	16
16	78	(Switzerland) Simona de Silvestro	Kelly Racing	Nissan Altima L33	2:30.5723	+2.9247	17
17	22	(Australia) James Courtney	Walkinshaw Andretti United	Holden Commodore ZB	2:30.6557	+3.0081	18
18	34	(Australia) James Golding	Garry Rogers Motorsport	Holden Commodore ZB	2:30.7457	+3.0981	19
19	5	(Australia) Lee Holdsworth	Tickford Racing	Ford Mustang GT	2:30.7643	+3.1167	20
20	3	(Australia) Garry Jacobson	Kelly Racing	Nissan Altima L33	2:30.9051	+3.2575	21
21	9	(Australia) David Reynolds	Erebus Motorsport	Holden Commodore ZB	2:31.1510	+3.5034	22
22	21	(Australia) Macauley Jones	Tim Blanchard Racing	Holden Commodore ZB	2:31.2474	+3.5998	23
23	56	(Australia) Brodie Kostecki	Kostecki Brothers Racing	Holden Commodore ZB	2:31.5758	+3.9282	24
24	27	(United States) Alexander Rossi	Walkinshaw Andretti United	Holden Commodore ZB	2:31.6046	+3.9570	25
25	19	(Australia) Jack Le Brocq	Tekno Autosports	Holden Commodore ZB	2:33.8786	+6.3210	26

=== Top 10 Shootout ===
Pos.	No.	Driver	Team	Car	Time	Gap	Grid
DSQ (Note: Scott McLaughlin started the race on pole, but was retrospectively stripped of the position on 10 November 2019, due to an engine infringement.)	17	(New Zealand) Scott McLaughlin	DJR Team Penske	Ford Mustang GT	2:03.3783		1
1	55	(Australia) Chaz Mostert	Tickford Racing	Ford Mustang GT	2:03.7897	+0.4114	2
2	6	(Australia) Cam Waters	Tickford Racing	Ford Mustang GT	2:03.9178	+0.5395	3
3	888	(Australia) Jamie Whincup	Triple Eight Race Engineering	Holden Commodore ZB	2:03.9505	+0.5722	4
4	97	(New Zealand) Shane van Gisbergen	Triple Eight Race Engineering	Holden Commodore ZB	2:04.1136	+0.7353	5
5	23	(Australia) Will Davison	23Red Racing	Ford Mustang GT	2:04.3295	+0.9512	6
6	99	(Australia) Anton de Pasquale	Erebus Motorsport	Holden Commodore ZB	2:04.3830	+1.0047	7
7	8	(Australia) Nick Percat	Brad Jones Racing	Holden Commodore ZB	2:04.6705	+1.2922	8
8	14	(Australia) Tim Slade	Brad Jones Racing	Holden Commodore ZB	2:04.8395	+1.4612	9
9	18	(Australia) Mark Winterbottom	Team 18	Holden Commodore ZB	2:04.9800	+1.6017	10

=== Race ===
Pos.	No.	Drivers	Team	Car	Laps	Time/Retired	Grid	Points
1	17	(New Zealand) Scott McLaughlin (France) Alexandre Prémat	DJR Team Penske	Ford Mustang GT	161	6:27:51.5260	1	300
2	97	(New Zealand) Shane van Gisbergen (Australia) Garth Tander	Triple Eight Race Engineering	Holden Commodore ZB	161	+0.6799	5	276
3	22	(Australia) James Courtney (Australia) Jack Perkins	Walkinshaw Andretti United	Holden Commodore ZB	161	+1.8769	18	258
4	888	(Australia) Jamie Whincup (Australia) Craig Lowndes	Triple Eight Race Engineering	Holden Commodore ZB	161	+2.6698	4	240
5	9	(Australia) David Reynolds (Australia) Luke Youlden	Erebus Motorsport	Holden Commodore ZB	161	+3.6430	22	222
6	18	(Australia) Mark Winterbottom (New Zealand) Steven Richards	Team 18	Holden Commodore ZB	161	+5.6227	10	204
7	2	(Australia) Scott Pye (Australia) Warren Luff	Walkinshaw Andretti United	Holden Commodore ZB	161	+6.6087	14	192
8	15	(Australia) Rick Kelly (Australia) Dale Wood	Kelly Racing	Nissan Altima L33	161	+6.6733	11	180
9	5	(Australia) Lee Holdsworth (Australia) Thomas Randle	Tickford Racing	Ford Mustang GT	161	+6.9839	20	168
10	23	(Australia) Will Davison (Australia) Alex Davison	23Red Racing	Ford Mustang GT	161	+7.7034	6	156
11	34	(Australia) James Golding (Australia) Richard Muscat	Garry Rogers Motorsport	Holden Commodore ZB	161	+7.8562	19	144
12	33	(New Zealand) Richie Stanaway (New Zealand) Chris Pither	Garry Rogers Motorsport	Holden Commodore ZB	161	+11.2623	12	138
13	78	(Switzerland) Simona de Silvestro (Australia) Alex Rullo	Kelly Racing	Nissan Altima L33	160	+1 lap	17	132
14	8	(Australia) Nick Percat (Australia) Tim Blanchard	Brad Jones Racing	Holden Commodore ZB	160	+1 lap	8	126
15	55	(Australia) Chaz Mostert (Australia) James Moffat	Tickford Racing	Ford Mustang GT	160	+1 lap	2	120
16	21	(Australia) Macauley Jones (Australia) Dean Canto	Tim Blanchard Racing	Holden Commodore ZB	160	+1 lap	23	114
17	19	(Australia) Jack Le Brocq (Australia) Jonathon Webb	Tekno Autosports	Holden Commodore ZB	160	+1 lap	26	108
18	27	(United States) Alexander Rossi (Canada) James Hinchcliffe	Walkinshaw Andretti United	Holden Commodore ZB	159	+2 laps	25	102
19	3	(Australia) Garry Jacobson (Australia) Dean Fiore	Kelly Racing	Nissan Altima L33	159	+2 laps	21	96
20	6	(Australia) Cam Waters (Australia) Michael Caruso	Tickford Racing	Ford Mustang GT	148	+13 laps	3	90
21 (Note: Couthard and D'Alberto initially finished sixth, but were relegated to twenty-first after a post-race investigation.)	12	(New Zealand) Fabian Coulthard (Australia) Tony D'Alberto	DJR Team Penske	Ford Mustang GT	161	+4.0868	16	84
Ret	7	(New Zealand) Andre Heimgartner (Australia) Bryce Fullwood	Kelly Racing	Nissan Altima L33	157	Accident	13	
Ret	99	(Australia) Anton de Pasquale (Australia) Will Brown	Erebus Motorsport	Holden Commodore ZB	125	Accident	7	
Ret	56	(Australia) Brodie Kostecki (Australia) Jake Kostecki	Kostecki Brothers Racing	Holden Commodore ZB	111	Accident	24	
Ret	35	(Australia) Todd Hazelwood (Australia) Jack Smith	Matt Stone Racing	Holden Commodore ZB	98	Accident	15	
Ret	14	(Australia) Tim Slade (Australia) Ashley Walsh	Brad Jones Racing	Holden Commodore ZB	0	Accident	9	

== Broadcast ==
The event telecast was produced by Supercars Media and carried domestically by Fox Sports Australia (via Fox Sports 506 and the new Kayo Sports platform), a paid service which covered all sessions including support categories, and Network 10 (via free-to-air channels 10 and 10 Bold), which covered select sessions from midday Friday onwards.

Fox Sports	Network 10
Host: Jessica Yates; Booth: Neil Crompton, Mark Skaife; Pit-lane: Riana Crehan, Andrew Jones, Greg Murphy, Mark Larkham; Supports: Richard Craill, Chad Neylon, Matt Naulty	Presenters: Aaron Noonan, Matthew White; Pundit: Rick Kelly; Roving: Scott MacKinnon, Kate Peck
