= 2018 Ipswich SuperSprint =

2018 V8 Supercar championship race

(Queensland) 2018 Ipswich SuperSprint
Event Information
- Round 9 of 16 in the 2018 Supercars Championship
- Date: 20–22 July 2018
- Location: Willowbank, Queensland
- Venue: Queensland Raceway

Results
Race 1
| Distance | 39 laps | 121.763 km |
| Pole position | (New Zealand) Scott McLaughlin; DJR Team Penske | 1:08.5014 |
| Winner | (New Zealand) Scott McLaughlin; DJR Team Penske | 46:40.8180 |
Race 2
| Distance | 65 laps | 202.938 km |
| Pole position | (New Zealand) Scott McLaughlin; DJR Team Penske | 1:08.4899 |
| Winner | (New Zealand) Shane van Gisbergen; Triple Eight Race Engineering | 1:18:33.4917 |

The 2018 Ipswich SuperSprint (formally known as 2018 Coates Hire Ipswich SuperSprint) was a motor racing event for the Supercars Championship, held on the weekend of 20–22 July 2018. The event was held at Queensland Raceway near Ipswich, Queensland and consisted of two races, 120 and 200 kilometres in length. It was the ninth event of sixteen in the 2018 Supercars Championship and hosted Races 19 and 20 of the season.

== Results ==
=== Practice ===
Practice summary
| Session | Day | Fastest lap | | | | |
| Session | Day | No. | Driver | Team | Car | Time |
|---|---|---|---|---|---|---|
| Practice 1 | Friday | 1 | (Australia) Jamie Whincup | Triple Eight Race Engineering | Holden Commodore ZB | 1:09.3904 |
| Practice 2 | Friday | 97 | (New Zealand) Shane van Gisbergen | Triple Eight Race Engineering | Holden Commodore ZB | 1:09.2446 |
| Practice 3 | Saturday | 17 | (New Zealand) Scott McLaughlin | DJR Team Penske | Ford FG X Falcon | 1:09.0644 |

=== Race 19 ===
==== Qualifying ====
| Pos. | No. | Name | Team | Car | Time | Gap | Grid |
|---|---|---|---|---|---|---|---|
| 1 | 17 | (New Zealand) Scott McLaughlin | DJR Team Penske | Ford Falcon FG X | 1:08.5014 | | 1 |
| 2 | 55 | (Australia) Chaz Mostert | Tickford Racing | Ford Falcon FG X | 1:08.6718 | +0.1704 | 5^{1} |
| 3 | 12 | (New Zealand) Fabian Coulthard | DJR Team Penske | Ford Falcon FG X | 1:08.6923 | +0.1909 | 2 |
| 4 | 9 | (Australia) David Reynolds | Erebus Motorsport | Holden Commodore ZB | 1:08.7217 | +0.2203 | 3 |
| 5 | 15 | (Australia) Rick Kelly | Nissan Motorsport | Nissan Altima L33 | 1:08.7522 | +0.2508 | 4 |
| 6 | 1 | (Australia) Jamie Whincup | Triple Eight Race Engineering | Holden Commodore ZB | 1:08.7657 | +0.2643 | 6 |
| 7 | 23 | (Australia) Michael Caruso | Nissan Motorsport | Nissan Altima L33 | 1:08.9264 | +0.4250 | 7 |
| 8 | 97 | (New Zealand) Shane van Gisbergen | Triple Eight Race Engineering | Holden Commodore ZB | 1:08.9565 | +0.4551 | 8 |
| 9 | 8 | (Australia) Nick Percat | Brad Jones Racing | Holden Commodore ZB | 1:08.9905 | +0.4891 | 9 |
| 10 | 888 | (Australia) Craig Lowndes | Triple Eight Race Engineering | Holden Commodore ZB | 1:09.0023 | +0.5009 | 10 |
| 11 | 33 | (Australia) Garth Tander | Garry Rogers Motorsport | Holden Commodore ZB | 1:09.0228 | +0.5214 | 11 |
| 12 | 25 | (Australia) James Courtney | Walkinshaw Andretti United | Holden Commodore ZB | 1:09.0563 | +0.5549 | 12 |
| 13 | 120 | (Australia) Will Davison | 23Red Racing | Ford Falcon FG X | 1:09.0614 | +0.5600 | 13 |
| 14 | 56 | (New Zealand) Richie Stanaway | Tickford Racing | Ford Falcon FG X | 1:09.0956 | +0.5942 | 14 |
| 15 | 14 | (Australia) Tim Slade | Brad Jones Racing | Holden Commodore ZB | 1:09.1609 | +0.6595 | 15 |
| 16 | 78 | (Switzerland) Simona de Silvestro | Nissan Motorsport | Nissan Altima L33 | 1:09.1703 | +0.6689 | 16 |
| 17 | 7 | (New Zealand) Andre Heimgartner | Nissan Motorsport | Nissan Altima L33 | 1:09.1848 | +0.6834 | 17 |
| 18 | 2 | (Australia) Scott Pye | Walkinshaw Andretti United | Holden Commodore ZB | 1:09.1885 | +0.6871 | 18 |
| 19 | 34 | (Australia) James Golding | Garry Rogers Motorsport | Holden Commodore ZB | 1:09.2142 | +0.7128 | 19 |
| 20 | 5 | (Australia) Mark Winterbottom | Tickford Racing | Ford Falcon FG X | 1:09.2557 | +0.7543 | 20 |
| 21 | 6 | (Australia) Cam Waters | Tickford Racing | Ford Falcon FG X | 1:09.2823 | +0.7809 | 21 |
| 22 | 99 | (Australia) Anton de Pasquale | Erebus Motorsport | Holden Commodore ZB | 1:09.3080 | +0.8066 | 22 |
| 23 | 19 | (Australia) Jack Le Brocq | Tekno Autosports | Holden Commodore ZB | 1:09.3552 | +0.8538 | 23 |
| 24 | 35 | (Australia) Todd Hazelwood | Matt Stone Racing | Ford Falcon FG X | 1:09.4364 | +0.9350 | 24 |
| 25 | 18 | (Australia) Lee Holdsworth | Team 18 | Holden Commodore ZB | 1:09.5701 | +1.0687 | 25 |
| 26 | 21 | (Australia) Tim Blanchard | Tim Blanchard Racing | Holden Commodore ZB | 1:09.5843 | +1.0829 | 26 |
| 27 | 42 | (Australia) Kurt Kostecki | Kostecki Brothers Racing | Holden Commodore VF | 1:09.7521 | +1.2507 | 27 |

Notes

- ^1– Chaz Mostert received a 3-place grid penalty for impeding Shane van Gisbergen in qualifying.

==== Race ====
| Pos | No. | Driver | Team | Car | Laps | Time / Retired | Grid | Points |
|---|---|---|---|---|---|---|---|---|
| 1 | 17 | (New Zealand) Scott McLaughlin | DJR Team Penske | Ford Falcon FG X | 39 | 46:40.8180 | 1 | 150 |
| 2 | 97 | (New Zealand) Shane van Gisbergen | Triple Eight Race Engineering | Holden Commodore ZB | 39 | +4.3165 | 8 | 138 |
| 3 | 888 | (Australia) Craig Lowndes | Triple Eight Race Engineering | Holden Commodore ZB | 39 | +5.8296 | 10 | 129 |
| 4 | 1 | (Australia) Jamie Whincup | Triple Eight Race Engineering | Holden Commodore ZB | 39 | +5.8720 | 6 | 120 |
| 5 | 12 | (New Zealand) Fabian Coulthard | DJR Team Penske | Ford Falcon FG X | 39 | +8.5049 | 2 | 111 |
| 6 | 55 | (Australia) Chaz Mostert | Tickford Racing | Ford Falcon FG X | 39 | +14.0687 | 5 | 102 |
| 7 | 9 | (Australia) David Reynolds | Erebus Motorsport | Holden Commodore ZB | 39 | +14.2846 | 3 | 96 |
| 8 | 25 | (Australia) James Courtney | Walkinshaw Andretti United | Holden Commodore ZB | 39 | +14.5036 | 12 | 90 |
| 9 | 23 | (Australia) Michael Caruso | Nissan Motorsport | Nissan Altima L33 | 39 | +14.8941 | 7 | 84 |
| 10 | 8 | (Australia) Nick Percat | Brad Jones Racing | Holden Commodore ZB | 39 | +16.6328 | 9 | 78 |
| 11 | 33 | (Australia) Garth Tander | Garry Rogers Motorsport | Holden Commodore ZB | 39 | +19.7967 | 11 | 72 |
| 12 | 56 | (New Zealand) Richie Stanaway | Tickford Racing | Ford Falcon FG X | 39 | +21.0874 | 14 | 69 |
| 13 | 15 | (Australia) Rick Kelly | Nissan Motorsport | Nissan Altima L33 | 39 | +21.4224 | 4 | 66 |
| 14 | 14 | (Australia) Tim Slade | Brad Jones Racing | Holden Commodore ZB | 39 | +21.7162 | 15 | 63 |
| 15 | 7 | (New Zealand) Andre Heimgartner | Nissan Motorsport | Nissan Altima L33 | 39 | +21.9856 | 17 | 60 |
| 16 | 2 | (Australia) Scott Pye | Walkinshaw Andretti United | Holden Commodore ZB | 39 | +22.5553 | 18 | 57 |
| 17 | 120 | (Australia) Will Davison | 23Red Racing | Ford Falcon FG X | 39 | +22.6494 | 13 | 54 |
| 18 | 34 | (Australia) James Golding | Garry Rogers Motorsport | Holden Commodore ZB | 39 | +23.5107 | 19 | 51 |
| 19 | 78 | (Switzerland) Simona de Silvestro | Nissan Motorsport | Nissan Altima L33 | 39 | +23.9889 | 16 | 48 |
| 20 | 5 | (Australia) Mark Winterbottom | Tickford Racing | Ford Falcon FG X | 39 | +24.2279 | 20 | 45 |
| 21 | 19 | (Australia) Jack Le Brocq | Tekno Autosports | Holden Commodore ZB | 39 | +24.5557 | 23 | 42 |
| 22 | 6 | (Australia) Cam Waters | Tickford Racing | Ford Falcon FG X | 39 | +32.3107 | 21 | 39 |
| 23 | 21 | (Australia) Tim Blanchard | Tim Blanchard Racing | Holden Commodore ZB | 39 | +37.1351 | 26 | 36 |
| 24 | 18 | (Australia) Lee Holdsworth | Team 18 | Holden Commodore ZB | 39 | +37.1989 | 25 | 33 |
| 25 | 42 | (Australia) Kurt Kostecki | Kostecki Brothers Racing | Holden Commodore VF | 39 | +38.2000 | 27 | 30 |
| 26 | 99 | (Australia) Anton de Pasquale | Erebus Motorsport | Holden Commodore ZB | 39 | +1:01.5537 | 22 | 27 |
| 27 | 35 | (Australia) Todd Hazelwood | Matt Stone Racing | Ford Falcon FG X | 34 | +5 laps | 24 | 24 |
Fastest lap: James Courtney (Walkinshaw Andretti United) 1:09.6591 (on lap 21)

==== Championship standings after Race 19 ====
Drivers' Championship standings

| | Pos | Driver | Pts | Gap |
|---|---|---|---|---|
| | 1 | (New Zealand) Scott McLaughlin | 2183 | |
| | 2 | (New Zealand) Shane van Gisbergen | 2040 | -143 |
| 1 | 3 | (Australia) Jamie Whincup | 1750 | -433 |
| 1 | 4 | (Australia) David Reynolds | 1742 | -441 |
| | 5 | (Australia) Craig Lowndes | 1731 | -452 |

Teams Championship

| | Pos | Team | Pts | Gap |
|---|---|---|---|---|
| | 1 | Triple Eight Race Engineering (1, 97) | 3789 | |
| | 2 | DJR Team Penske | 3724 | -65 |
| | 3 | Walkinshaw Andretti United | 2767 | -1022 |
| 1 | 4 | Tickford Racing (5, 55) | 2605 | -1184 |
| 1 | 5 | Brad Jones Racing | 2595 | -1194 |

- Note: Only the top five positions are included for both sets of standings.

=== Race 20 ===
==== Qualifying ====
| Pos. | No. | Name | Team | Car | Time | Gap | Grid |
|---|---|---|---|---|---|---|---|
| 1 | 17 | (New Zealand) Scott McLaughlin | DJR Team Penske | Ford Falcon FG X | 1:08.4899 | | 1 |
| 2 | 97 | (New Zealand) Shane van Gisbergen | Triple Eight Race Engineering | Holden Commodore ZB | 1:08.5382 | +0.0483 | 2 |
| 7 | 1 | (Australia) Jamie Whincup | Triple Eight Race Engineering | Holden Commodore ZB | 1:08.5973 | +0.3266 | 3 |
| 6 | 15 | (Australia) Rick Kelly | Nissan Motorsport | Nissan Altima L33 | 1:08.6350 | +0.2683 | 4 |
| 5 | 9 | (Australia) David Reynolds | Erebus Motorsport | Holden Commodore ZB | 1:08.7112 | +0.2213 | 5 |
| 4 | 12 | (New Zealand) Fabian Coulthard | DJR Team Penske | Ford Falcon FG X | 1:08.7582 | +0.1451 | 6 |
| 3 | 55 | (Australia) Chaz Mostert | Tickford Racing | Ford Falcon FG X | 1:08.8165 | +0.1074 | 7 |
| 8 | 888 | (Australia) Craig Lowndes | Triple Eight Race Engineering | Holden Commodore ZB | 1:08.8357 | +0.3458 | 8 |
| 9 | 23 | (Australia) Michael Caruso | Nissan Motorsport | Nissan Altima L33 | 1:08.8516 | +0.3617 | 9 |
| 10 | 56 | (New Zealand) Richie Stanaway | Tickford Racing | Ford Falcon FG X | 1:08.8552 | +0.3653 | 10 |
| 11 | 33 | (Australia) Garth Tander | Garry Rogers Motorsport | Holden Commodore ZB | 1:08.9076 | +0.4177 | 11 |
| 12 | 19 | (Australia) Jack Le Brocq | Tekno Autosports | Holden Commodore ZB | 1:08.9102 | +0.4203 | 12 |
| 13 | 120 | (Australia) Will Davison | 23Red Racing | Ford Falcon FG X | 1:08.9196 | +0.4297 | 13 |
| 14 | 7 | (New Zealand) Andre Heimgartner | Nissan Motorsport | Nissan Altima L33 | 1:08.9381 | +0.4482 | 14 |
| 15 | 6 | (Australia) Cam Waters | Tickford Racing | Ford Falcon FG X | 1:08.9766 | +0.4867 | 15 |
| 16 | 5 | (Australia) Mark Winterbottom | Tickford Racing | Ford Falcon FG X | 1:08.9799 | +0.4900 | 16 |
| 17 | 78 | (Switzerland) Simona de Silvestro | Nissan Motorsport | Nissan Altima L33 | 1:08.9931 | +0.5032 | 17 |
| 18 | 25 | (Australia) James Courtney | Walkinshaw Andretti United | Holden Commodore ZB | 1:09.0438 | +0.5539 | 18 |
| 19 | 14 | (Australia) Tim Slade | Brad Jones Racing | Holden Commodore ZB | 1:09.0605 | +0.5706 | 19 |
| 20 | 2 | (Australia) Scott Pye | Walkinshaw Andretti United | Holden Commodore ZB | 1:09.0969 | +0.6070 | 20 |
| 21 | 18 | (Australia) Lee Holdsworth | Team 18 | Holden Commodore ZB | 1:09.1551 | +0.6652 | 21 |
| 22 | 34 | (Australia) James Golding | Garry Rogers Motorsport | Holden Commodore ZB | 1:09.1684 | +0.6785 | 22 |
| 23 | 99 | (Australia) Anton de Pasquale | Erebus Motorsport | Holden Commodore ZB | 1:09.2684 | +0.7785 | 23 |
| 24 | 35 | (Australia) Todd Hazelwood | Matt Stone Racing | Ford Falcon FG X | 1:09.4135 | +0.9236 | 24 |
| 25 | 8 | (Australia) Nick Percat | Brad Jones Racing | Holden Commodore ZB | 1:09.4184 | +0.9285 | 25 |
| 26 | 42 | (Australia) Kurt Kostecki | Kostecki Brothers Racing | Holden Commodore VF | 1:09.5348 | +1.0449 | 26 |
| 27 | 21 | (Australia) Tim Blanchard | Tim Blanchard Racing | Holden Commodore ZB | 1:09.5702 | +1.0803 | 27 |

==== Race ====
| Pos | No. | Driver | Team | Car | Laps | Time / Retired | Grid | Points |
|---|---|---|---|---|---|---|---|---|
| 1 | 97 | (New Zealand) Shane van Gisbergen | Triple Eight Race Engineering | Holden Commodore ZB | 65 | 1:18:33.4917 | 2 | 150 |
| 2 | 17 | (New Zealand) Scott McLaughlin | DJR Team Penske | Ford Falcon FG X | 65 | +2.3514 | 1 | 138 |
| 3 | 55 | (Australia) Chaz Mostert | Tickford Racing | Ford Falcon FG X | 65 | +5.4173 | 7 | 129 |
| 4 | 1 | (Australia) Jamie Whincup | Triple Eight Race Engineering | Holden Commodore ZB | 65 | +5.5275 | 3 | 120 |
| 5 | 12 | (New Zealand) Fabian Coulthard | DJR Team Penske | Ford Falcon FG X | 65 | +7.0074 | 6 | 111 |
| 6 | 14 | (Australia) Tim Slade | Brad Jones Racing | Holden Commodore ZB | 65 | +7.4225 | 19 | 102 |
| 7 | 9 | (Australia) David Reynolds | Erebus Motorsport | Holden Commodore ZB | 65 | +7.9245 | 5 | 96 |
| 8 | 888 | (Australia) Craig Lowndes | Triple Eight Race Engineering | Holden Commodore ZB | 65 | +16.0718 | 8 | 90 |
| 9 | 15 | (Australia) Rick Kelly | Nissan Motorsport | Nissan Altima L33 | 65 | +23.9446 | 4 | 84 |
| 10 | 19 | (Australia) Jack Le Brocq | Tekno Autosports | Holden Commodore ZB | 65 | +24.4888 | 12 | 78 |
| 11 | 33 | (Australia) Garth Tander | Garry Rogers Motorsport | Holden Commodore ZB | 65 | +25.6847 | 11 | 72 |
| 12 | 120 | (Australia) Will Davison | 23Red Racing | Ford Falcon FG X | 65 | +28.1092 | 13 | 69 |
| 13 | 23 | (Australia) Michael Caruso | Nissan Motorsport | Nissan Altima L33 | 65 | +34.3323 | 9 | 66 |
| 14 | 7 | (New Zealand) Andre Heimgartner | Nissan Motorsport | Nissan Altima L33 | 65 | +34.5894 | 14 | 63 |
| 15 | 34 | (Australia) James Golding | Garry Rogers Motorsport | Holden Commodore ZB | 65 | +36.3364 | 22 | 60 |
| 16 | 99 | (Australia) Anton de Pasquale | Erebus Motorsport | Holden Commodore ZB | 65 | +37.3291 | 23 | 57 |
| 17 | 6 | (Australia) Cam Waters | Tickford Racing | Ford Falcon FG X | 65 | +39.8067^{1} | 15 | 54 |
| 18 | 56 | (New Zealand) Richie Stanaway | Tickford Racing | Ford Falcon FG X | 65 | +42.7017 | 10 | 51 |
| 19 | 2 | (Australia) Scott Pye | Walkinshaw Andretti United | Holden Commodore ZB | 65 | +43.7084 | 20 | 48 |
| 20 | 78 | (Switzerland) Simona de Silvestro | Nissan Motorsport | Nissan Altima L33 | 65 | +54.9599 | 17 | 45 |
| 21 | 18 | (Australia) Lee Holdsworth | Team 18 | Holden Commodore ZB | 65 | +59.2423^{2} | 21 | 42 |
| 22 | 21 | (Australia) Tim Blanchard | Tim Blanchard Racing | Holden Commodore ZB | 65 | +1:01.4743 | 27 | 39 |
| 23 | 42 | (Australia) Kurt Kostecki | Kostecki Brothers Racing | Holden Commodore VF | 65 | +1:02.5355^{3} | 26 | 36 |
| 24 | 35 | (Australia) Todd Hazelwood | Matt Stone Racing | Ford Falcon FG X | 65 | +1:08.7571 | 24 | 33 |
| 25 | 8 | (Australia) Nick Percat | Brad Jones Racing | Holden Commodore ZB | 64 | +1 lap | 25 | 30 |
| 26 | 5 | (Australia) Mark Winterbottom | Tickford Racing | Ford Falcon FG X | 61 | +4 laps | 16 | 27 |
| NC | 25 | (Australia) James Courtney | Walkinshaw Andretti United | Holden Commodore ZB | 24 | Retirement | 18 | |
Fastest lap: Tim Slade (Brad Jones Racing) 1:09.8397 (on lap 22)

Notes

- ^1– Cam Waters received a 5-second post-race Time Penalty for Careless Driving, causing contact with Simona de Silvestro.
- ^2– Lee Holdsworth received a 15-second post-race Time Penalty for Careless Driving, causing contact with Simona de Silvestro.
- ^3– Kurt Kostecki received a 15-second Time Penalty for Careless Driving, causing contact with Tim Blanchard.

==== Championship standings after Race 20 ====
Drivers' Championship standings

| Pos | Driver | Pts | Gap |
|---|---|---|---|
| 1 | (New Zealand) Scott McLaughlin | 2321 | |
| 2 | (New Zealand) Shane van Gisbergen | 2190 | -131 |
| 3 | (Australia) Jamie Whincup | 1870 | -451 |
| 4 | (Australia) David Reynolds | 1838 | -483 |
| 5 | (Australia) Craig Lowndes | 1821 | -500 |

Teams Championship

| | Pos | Team | Pts | Gap |
|---|---|---|---|---|
| | 1 | Triple Eight Race Engineering (1, 97) | 4059 | |
| | 2 | DJR Team Penske | 3973 | -86 |
| | 3 | Walkinshaw Andretti United | 2815 | -1244 |
| | 4 | Tickford Racing (5, 55) | 2761 | -1298 |
| 1 | 5 | Erebus Motorsport | 2743 | -1316 |

- Note: Only the top five positions are included for both sets of standings.
