= 2018 The Bend SuperSprint =

2018 V8 Supercar championship race

(South Australia) 2018 The Bend SuperSprint
Event Information
- Round 11 of 16 in the 2018 Supercars Championship
- Date: 24–26 August 2018
- Location: Tailem Bend, South Australia
- Venue: The Bend Motorsport Park

Results
Race 1
Distance	24 laps	118.808 km
Pole position	(Australia) Jamie Whincup; Triple Eight Race Engineering	1:50.1371
Winner	(New Zealand) Shane van Gisbergen; Triple Eight Race Engineering	48:23.2330
Race 2
Distance	41 laps	202.964 km
Pole position	(Australia) Jamie Whincup; Triple Eight Race Engineering	1:48.6498
Winner	(Australia) Jamie Whincup; Triple Eight Race Engineering	1:17:54.3861

The 2018 The Bend SuperSprint (formally known as the 2018 OTR SuperSprint at The Bend Motorsport Park) was a motor racing event for Supercars, held on the weekend of 24–26 August 2018. The event was held at The Bend Motorsport Park near Tailem Bend in South Australia and was the first Supercars event to be held at the circuit. It was the eleventh round of sixteen in the 2018 Supercars Championship and hosted Races 22 and 23 of the season.

== Background ==
=== Entry alterations ===
The round was open to wildcard entries from the Super2 Series and saw the grid expanded to twenty-eight cars with the addition of two extra entries – Brad Jones Racing entering a third Holden Commodore ZB for Macauley Jones, and Kostecki Brothers Racing entering their Super2 Holden Commodore VF and driver Kurt Kostecki.

Rookie main game team Matt Stone Racing and driver Todd Hazelwood reverted to the Holden Commodore VF they used to win the 2017 Super2 Series championship.

== Results ==
=== Practice ===
Practice summary
Session	Day	Fastest lap				
Session	Day	No.	Driver	Team	Car	Time
Practice 1	Friday	14	(Australia) Tim Slade	Brad Jones Racing	Holden Commodore ZB	1:50.1395
Practice 2	Friday	97	(New Zealand) Shane van Gisbergen	Triple Eight Race Engineering	Holden Commodore ZB	1:48.7499
Practice 3	Saturday	8	(Australia) Nick Percat	Brad Jones Racing	Holden Commodore ZB	1:49.5892

=== Race 22 ===
==== Qualifying ====
Pos.	No.	Name	Team	Car	Time	Gap	Grid
1	1	(Australia) Jamie Whincup	Triple Eight Race Engineering	Holden Commodore ZB	1:50.1371		1
2	97	(New Zealand) Shane van Gisbergen	Triple Eight Race Engineering	Holden Commodore ZB	1:50.2943	+0.1572	2
3	23	(Australia) Michael Caruso	Nissan Motorsport	Nissan Altima L33	1:50.6964	+0.5593	3
4	15	(Australia) Rick Kelly	Nissan Motorsport	Nissan Altima L33	1:50.7826	+0.6455	4
5	17	(New Zealand) Scott McLaughlin	DJR Team Penske	Ford Falcon FG X	1:50.8069	+0.6698	5
6	5	(Australia) Mark Winterbottom	Tickford Racing	Ford Falcon FG X	1:50.9940	+0.8569	6
7	55	(Australia) Chaz Mostert	Tickford Racing	Ford Falcon FG X	1:51.0414	+0.9043	7
8	6	(Australia) Cam Waters	Tickford Racing	Ford Falcon FG X	1:51.2175	+1.0804	8
9	14	(Australia) Tim Slade	Brad Jones Racing	Holden Commodore ZB	1:51.2219	+1.0848	9
10	33	(Australia) Garth Tander	Garry Rogers Motorsport	Holden Commodore ZB	1:51.2454	+1.1083	10
11	230	(Australia) Will Davison	23Red Racing	Ford Falcon FG X	1:51.3326	+1.1955	11
12	8	(Australia) Nick Percat	Brad Jones Racing	Holden Commodore ZB	1:51.4100	+1.2729	12
13	21	(Australia) Tim Blanchard	Tim Blanchard Racing	Holden Commodore ZB	1:51.4329	+1.2958	13
14	18	(Australia) Lee Holdsworth	Team 18	Holden Commodore ZB	1:51.4775	+1.3404	14
15	19	(Australia) Jack Le Brocq	Tekno Autosports	Holden Commodore ZB	1:51.4849	+1.3478	15
16	34	(Australia) James Golding	Garry Rogers Motorsport	Holden Commodore ZB	1:51.5193	+1.3822	16
17	9	(Australia) David Reynolds	Erebus Motorsport	Holden Commodore ZB	1:51.5601	+1.4230	17
18	7	(New Zealand) Andre Heimgartner	Nissan Motorsport	Nissan Altima L33	1:51.5823	+1.4452	18
19	4	(Australia) Macauley Jones	Brad Jones Racing	Holden Commodore ZB	1:51.5901	+1.4530	19
20	99	(Australia) Anton de Pasquale	Erebus Motorsport	Holden Commodore ZB	1:51.6773	+1.5402	20
21	78	(Switzerland) Simona de Silvestro	Nissan Motorsport	Nissan Altima L33	1:51.8424	+1.7053	21
22	12	(New Zealand) Fabian Coulthard	DJR Team Penske	Ford Falcon FG X	1:51.8455	+1.7084	22
23	2	(Australia) Scott Pye	Walkinshaw Andretti United	Holden Commodore ZB	1:51.8571	+1.7200	23
24	25	(Australia) James Courtney	Walkinshaw Andretti United	Holden Commodore ZB	1:51.9839	+1.8468	24
25	888	(Australia) Craig Lowndes	Triple Eight Race Engineering	Holden Commodore ZB	1:52.1635	+2.0264	25
26	56	(New Zealand) Richie Stanaway	Tickford Racing	Ford Falcon FG X	1:52.1902	+2.0531	26
27	42	(Australia) Kurt Kostecki	Kostecki Brothers Racing	Holden Commodore VF	1:53.9438	+3.8067	27
28	35	(Australia) Todd Hazelwood	Matt Stone Racing	Holden Commodore VF	1:54.2403	+4.1032	28

==== Race ====
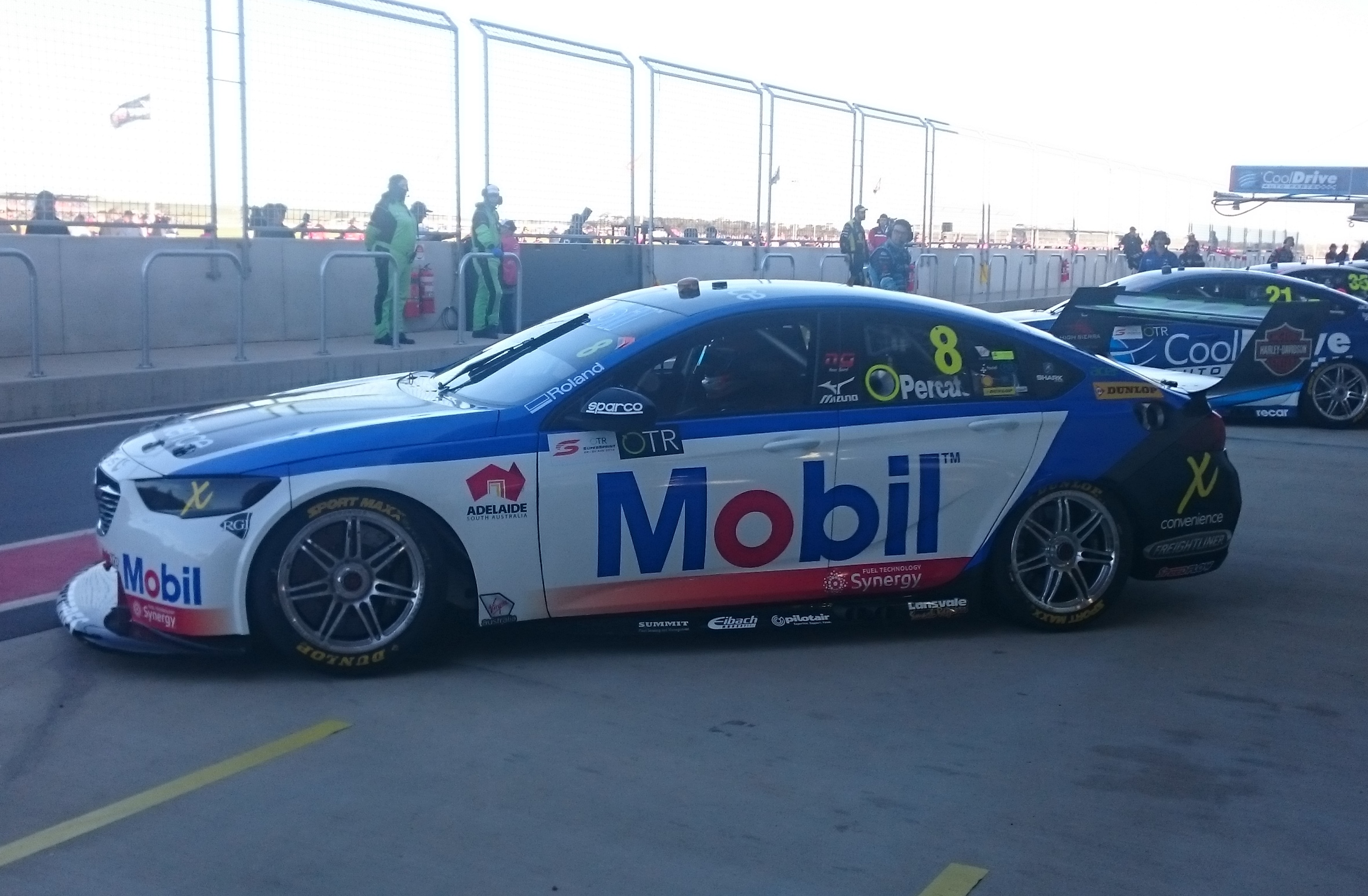
Nick Percat placed eleventh in Race 22 driving a Holden Commodore ZB

Pos	No.	Driver	Team	Car	Laps	Time / Retired	Grid	Points
1	97	(New Zealand) Shane van Gisbergen	Triple Eight Race Engineering	Holden Commodore ZB	24	48:23.2330	2	150
2	15	(Australia) Rick Kelly	Nissan Motorsport	Nissan Altima L33	24	+6.2601	4	138
3	23	(Australia) Michael Caruso	Nissan Motorsport	Nissan Altima L33	24	+8.9121	3	129
4	1	(Australia) Jamie Whincup	Triple Eight Race Engineering	Holden Commodore ZB	24	+12.8869	1	120
5	5	(Australia) Mark Winterbottom	Tickford Racing	Ford Falcon FG X	24	+15.8231	6	111
6	17	(New Zealand) Scott McLaughlin	DJR Team Penske	Ford Falcon FG X	24	+16.3999	5	102
7	230	(Australia) Will Davison	23Red Racing	Ford Falcon FG X	24	+16.7756	11	96
8	25	(Australia) James Courtney	Walkinshaw Andretti United	Holden Commodore ZB	24	+17.2385	24	90
9	55	(Australia) Chaz Mostert	Tickford Racing	Ford Falcon FG X	24	+18.4190	7	84
10	888	(Australia) Craig Lowndes	Triple Eight Race Engineering	Holden Commodore ZB	24	+19.3586	25	78
11	8	(Australia) Nick Percat	Brad Jones Racing	Holden Commodore ZB	24	+20.5996	12	72
12	14	(Australia) Tim Slade	Brad Jones Racing	Holden Commodore ZB	24	+22.7779	9	69
13	6	(Australia) Cam Waters	Tickford Racing	Ford Falcon FG X	24	+24.9283	8	66
14	12	(New Zealand) Fabian Coulthard	DJR Team Penske	Ford Falcon FG X	24	+27.3514	22	63
15	21	(Australia) Tim Blanchard	Tim Blanchard Racing	Holden Commodore ZB	24	+28.0386	13	60
16	19	(Australia) Jack Le Brocq	Tekno Autosports	Holden Commodore ZB	24	+33.5283	15	57
17	9	(Australia) David Reynolds	Erebus Motorsport	Holden Commodore ZB	24	+33.7630	17	54
18	2	(Australia) Scott Pye	Walkinshaw Andretti United	Holden Commodore ZB	24	+34.0829	23	51
19	7	(New Zealand) Andre Heimgartner	Nissan Motorsport	Nissan Altima L33	24	+34.6398	18	48
20	18	(Australia) Lee Holdsworth	Team 18	Holden Commodore ZB	24	+39.7718	14	45
21	34	(Australia) James Golding	Garry Rogers Motorsport	Holden Commodore ZB	24	+41.8972	16	42
22	56	(New Zealand) Richie Stanaway	Tickford Racing	Ford Falcon FG X	24	+43.2828	26	39
23	78	(Switzerland) Simona de Silvestro	Nissan Motorsport	Nissan Altima L33	24	+43.7149	21	36
24	99	(Australia) Anton de Pasquale	Erebus Motorsport	Holden Commodore ZB	24	+45.3631	20	33
25	4	(Australia) Macauley Jones	Brad Jones Racing	Holden Commodore ZB	24	+45.5782	19	30
26	35	(Australia) Todd Hazelwood	Matt Stone Racing	Holden Commodore VF	24	+57.9581	28	27
27	42	(Australia) Kurt Kostecki	Kostecki Brothers Racing	Holden Commodore VF	24	+1:07.6492	27	24
28	33	(Australia) Garth Tander	Garry Rogers Motorsport	Holden Commodore ZB	18	+6 laps^{1}	10	21
Fastest lap: Shane van Gisbergen (Triple Eight Race Engineering) 1:51.1629 (on lap 10)

Notes

- ^1– Garth Tander received a 90-second post-race Time Penalty for failing to complete the CPS requirements for the Race.

==== Championship standings after Race 22 ====
Drivers' Championship standings

Pos	Driver	Pts	Gap
1	(New Zealand) Scott McLaughlin	2681	
2	(New Zealand) Shane van Gisbergen	2640	-41
3	(Australia) Jamie Whincup	2266	-415
4	(Australia) Craig Lowndes	2139	-542
5	(Australia) David Reynolds	2084	-597

Teams Championship

Pos	Team	Pts	Gap
1	Triple Eight Race Engineering (1, 97)	4905	
2	DJR Team Penske	4540	-365
3	Tickford Racing (5, 55)	3298	-1607
4	Brad Jones Racing	3204	-1701
5	Erebus Motorsport	3124	-1781

- Note: Only the top five positions are included for both sets of standings.

=== Race 23 ===
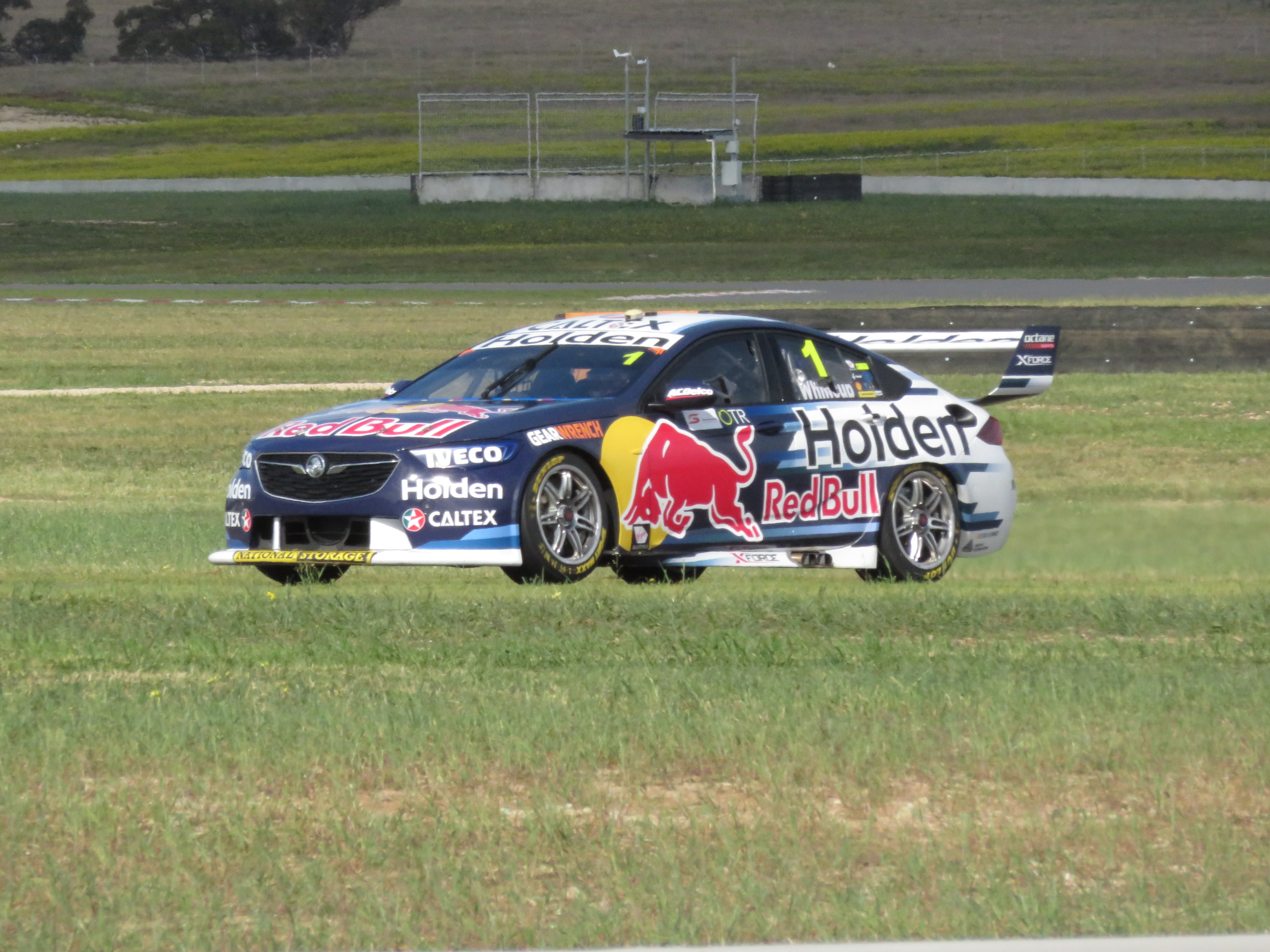
Jamie Whincup won Race 23 at the event.

==== Qualifying ====
Pos.	No.	Name	Team	Car	Time	Gap	Grid
1	1	(Australia) Jamie Whincup	Triple Eight Race Engineering	Holden Commodore ZB	1:48.6498		1
2	97	(New Zealand) Shane van Gisbergen	Triple Eight Race Engineering	Holden Commodore ZB	1:49.0515	+0.4017	2
3	14	(Australia) Tim Slade	Brad Jones Racing	Holden Commodore ZB	1:49.3326	+0.6828	3
4	2	(Australia) Scott Pye	Walkinshaw Andretti United	Holden Commodore ZB	1:49.4152	+0.7654	4
5	23	(Australia) Michael Caruso	Nissan Motorsport	Nissan Altima L33	1:49.5336	+0.8838	5
6	888	(Australia) Craig Lowndes	Triple Eight Race Engineering	Holden Commodore ZB	1:49.5564	+0.9066	6
7	25	(Australia) James Courtney	Walkinshaw Andretti United	Holden Commodore ZB	1:49.5622	+0.9124	7
8	99	(Australia) Anton de Pasquale	Erebus Motorsport	Holden Commodore ZB	1:49.5774	+0.9276	8
9	15	(Australia) Rick Kelly	Nissan Motorsport	Nissan Altima L33	1:49.6589	+1.0091	9
10	17	(New Zealand) Scott McLaughlin	DJR Team Penske	Ford Falcon FG X	1:49.6845	+1.0347	10
11	7	(New Zealand) Andre Heimgartner	Nissan Motorsport	Nissan Altima L33	1:49.6957	+1.0459	11
12	9	(Australia) David Reynolds	Erebus Motorsport	Holden Commodore ZB	1:49.7013	+1.0515	12
13	12	(New Zealand) Fabian Coulthard	DJR Team Penske	Ford Falcon FG X	1:49.7324	+1.0826	13
14	6	(Australia) Cam Waters	Tickford Racing	Ford Falcon FG X	1:49.8696	+1.2198	14
15	8	(Australia) Nick Percat	Brad Jones Racing	Holden Commodore ZB	1:49.8853	+1.2355	15
16	230	(Australia) Will Davison	23Red Racing	Ford Falcon FG X	1:49.9030	+1.2532	16
17	5	(Australia) Mark Winterbottom	Tickford Racing	Ford Falcon FG X	1:49.9457	+1.2959	17
18	33	(Australia) Garth Tander	Garry Rogers Motorsport	Holden Commodore ZB	1:50.0923	+1.4425	18
19	19	(Australia) Jack Le Brocq	Tekno Autosports	Holden Commodore ZB	1:50.2835	+1.6337	19
20	4	(Australia) Macauley Jones	Brad Jones Racing	Holden Commodore ZB	1:50.3359	+1.6861	20
21	78	(Switzerland) Simona de Silvestro	Nissan Motorsport	Nissan Altima L33	1:50.3797	+1.7299	21
22	18	(Australia) Lee Holdsworth	Team 18	Holden Commodore ZB	1:50.4713	+1.8215	22
23	21	(Australia) Tim Blanchard	Tim Blanchard Racing	Holden Commodore ZB	1:50.4792	+1.8294	23
24	55	(Australia) Chaz Mostert	Tickford Racing	Ford Falcon FG X	1:50.6633	+2.0135	24
25	34	(Australia) James Golding	Garry Rogers Motorsport	Holden Commodore ZB	1:50.8773	+2.2275	25
26	42	(Australia) Kurt Kostecki	Kostecki Brothers Racing	Holden Commodore VF	1:51.1777	+2.5279	26
27	56	(New Zealand) Richie Stanaway	Tickford Racing	Ford Falcon FG X	1:51.1898	+2.5400	28^{1}
28	35	(Australia) Todd Hazelwood	Matt Stone Racing	Holden Commodore VF	1:52.0455	+3.3957	27

Notes

- ^1– Richie Stanaway received a 3-place grid penalty for impeding James Golding in qualifying. But as he qualifies 27th, 2 of the 3 Grid Spot penalties will carry over to the next Event.

==== Race ====
Pos	No.	Driver	Team	Car	Laps	Time / Retired	Grid	Points
1	1	(Australia) Jamie Whincup	Triple Eight Race Engineering	Holden Commodore ZB	41	1:17:54.3861	1	150
2	97	(New Zealand) Shane van Gisbergen	Triple Eight Race Engineering	Holden Commodore ZB	41	+11.2894	2	138
3	9	(Australia) David Reynolds	Erebus Motorsport	Holden Commodore ZB	41	+13.4575	12	129
4	14	(Australia) Tim Slade	Brad Jones Racing	Holden Commodore ZB	41	+20.5439	3	120
5	8	(Australia) Nick Percat	Brad Jones Racing	Holden Commodore ZB	41	+22.0638	15	111
6	2	(Australia) Scott Pye	Walkinshaw Andretti United	Holden Commodore ZB	41	+24.6875	4	102
7	230	(Australia) Will Davison	23Red Racing	Ford Falcon FG X	41	+26.3717	16	96
8	888	(Australia) Craig Lowndes	Triple Eight Race Engineering	Holden Commodore ZB	41	+30.5943	6	90
9	23	(Australia) Michael Caruso	Nissan Motorsport	Nissan Altima L33	41	+32.4143	5	84
10	17	(New Zealand) Scott McLaughlin	DJR Team Penske	Ford Falcon FG X	41	+34.9658	10	78
11	99	(Australia) Anton de Pasquale	Erebus Motorsport	Holden Commodore ZB	41	+43.5850	8	72
12	55	(Australia) Chaz Mostert	Tickford Racing	Ford Falcon FG X	41	+44.4194	24	69
13	25	(Australia) James Courtney	Walkinshaw Andretti United	Holden Commodore ZB	41	+47.0991	7	66
14	12	(New Zealand) Fabian Coulthard	DJR Team Penske	Ford Falcon FG X	41	+47.3777	13	63
15	6	(Australia) Cam Waters	Tickford Racing	Ford Falcon FG X	41	+47.7844	14	60
16	5	(Australia) Mark Winterbottom	Tickford Racing	Ford Falcon FG X	41	+49.0798	17	57
17	15	(Australia) Rick Kelly	Nissan Motorsport	Nissan Altima L33	41	+53.5339	9	54
18	19	(Australia) Jack Le Brocq	Tekno Autosports	Holden Commodore ZB	41	+1:09.2666	19	51
19	4	(Australia) Macauley Jones	Brad Jones Racing	Holden Commodore ZB	41	+1:13.2971	20	48
20	33	(Australia) Garth Tander	Garry Rogers Motorsport	Holden Commodore ZB	41	+1:13.8810	18	45
21	21	(Australia) Tim Blanchard	Tim Blanchard Racing	Holden Commodore ZB	41	+1:22.0579	23	42
22	56	(New Zealand) Richie Stanaway	Tickford Racing	Ford Falcon FG X	41	+1:36.0884	28	39
23	78	(Switzerland) Simona de Silvestro	Nissan Motorsport	Nissan Altima L33	41	+1:45.0074	21	36
24	34	(Australia) James Golding	Garry Rogers Motorsport	Holden Commodore ZB	41	+1:45.5867	25	33
25	35	(Australia) Todd Hazelwood	Matt Stone Racing	Holden Commodore VF	40	+1 lap	27	30
NC	18	(Australia) Lee Holdsworth	Team 18	Holden Commodore ZB	20	Retirement	22	
NC	7	(New Zealand) Andre Heimgartner	Nissan Motorsport	Nissan Altima L33	4	Retirement	11	
NC	42	(Australia) Kurt Kostecki	Kostecki Brothers Racing	Holden Commodore VF	1	Retirement	26	
Fastest lap: Jamie Whincup (Triple Eight Race Engineering) 1:50.5833 (on lap 40)

==== Championship standings after Race 23 ====
Drivers' Championship standings

	Pos	Driver	Pts	Gap
1	1	(New Zealand) Shane van Gisbergen	2778	
1	2	(New Zealand) Scott McLaughlin	2759	-19
	3	(Australia) Jamie Whincup	2416	-362
	4	(Australia) Craig Lowndes	2229	-549
	5	(Australia) David Reynolds	2213	-565

Teams Championship

	Pos	Team	Pts	Gap
	1	Triple Eight Race Engineering (1, 97)	5193	
	2	DJR Team Penske	4681	-512
1	3	Brad Jones Racing	3435	-1758
1	4	Tickford Racing (5, 55)	3424	-1769
	5	Erebus Motorsport	3325	-1868

- Note: Only the top five positions are included for both sets of standings.
