= Bathurst 250 =

Former annual racing event

(Victoria (state)) Bathurst 250
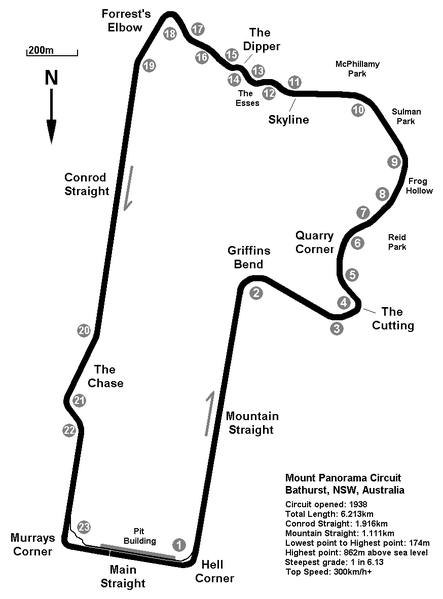
- Race Information
Venue	Mount Panorama Circuit
Number of times held	10
First held	2001
Last held	2019
- Race Format
- Race 1
Laps	41
Distance	250 km
- Last Event (2019)
- Overall Winner
(Australia) Thomas Randle	Tickford Racing
- Race Winners
(Australia) Thomas Randle	Tickford Racing

The Bathurst 250 was an annual motor racing event, held for the Super2 Series at the Mount Panorama Circuit in Bathurst, New South Wales, Australia. The race supported the Bathurst 1000 which the Supercars Championship (parent series) has run since 1963. The event, which was in later years part of the championship season, was a single-race event, held over an endurance distance of 250 kilometres (160 miles), and allowing for optional driver changes - a first for the series.

In 2020, the event was replaced by a multi-race sprint round, as had previously been run for the category between 2005 and 2013.

== Background ==
The second-tier series to the Supercars Championship launched as V8 Lites in 2000, before later becoming known as the Super2 Series. Starting in 2001, a 30 lap (approximately 185 km) non-championship feature race was held for the series as part of the Bathurst 1000 weekend. In 2003, this was reduced to 25 laps (approximately 155 km). From 2005 onwards, a Bathurst round joined the championship proper, however as multiple sprint races rather than as a single feature race.

In 2014 the Development Series announced it would introduce a showcase 250 km mini endurance race on the Saturday of Bathurst 1000 weekend, giving teams and drivers a real taste of competing at Australia's greatest circuit. Another new addition for the series was the option to run co-drivers in the race, meaning a regular driver could opt to contest the full 41-lap race alone, or share with another driver. During the race, teams are required to make one compulsory pit stop, for a minimum fuel drop of 80 litres and four tyres.

== History ==
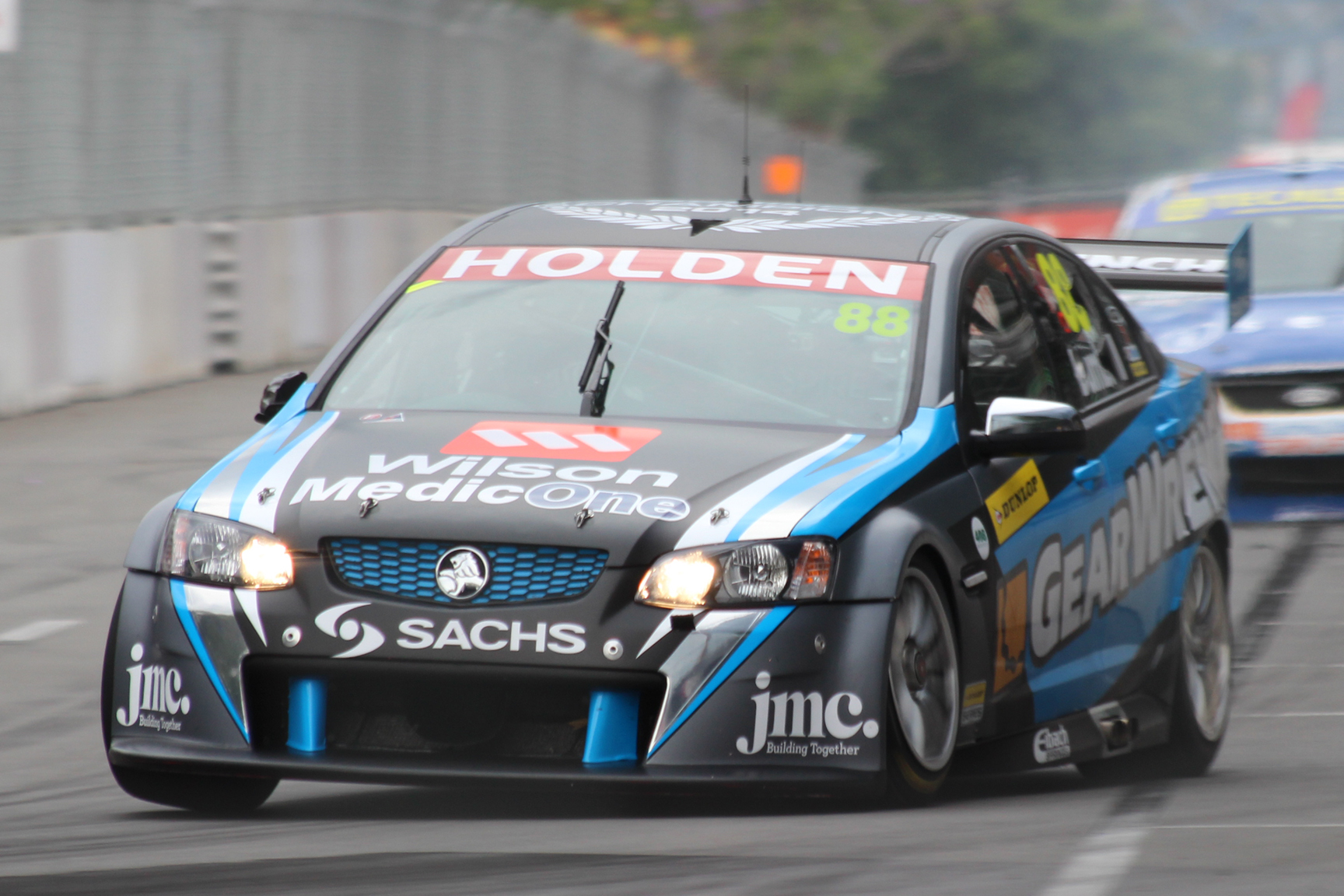
Paul Dumbrell (pictured at the Homebush Street Circuit in 2014) is a three-time winner of the Bathurst 250

The first 250 km championship race was won by 2012 Bathurst 1000 winner Paul Dumbrell in his Eggleston Motorsport Commodore. Following Dumbrell home was Ford Performance Racing's Cameron Waters with Brad Jones Racing's Chris Pither finishing a strong third. The race only made 38 Laps due to three different safety car periods with 8 cars failing to make it to the finish. Despite not making full distance, the race was deemed a success. The 2015 race was once again a cracker with 23 cars making it to the starting grid. 2014 race winner Paul Dumbrell started on Pole Position for the race with 2014 runner up Cameron Waters alongside of him. The 2015 race was again met by 3 safety car periods this time only shortening the race by one lap. After the 40 lap race was run Paul Dumbrell again stood on top on the podium, interesting enough the Top 5 in the race were exactly the same as the 2014 race. With Cameron Waters second, Chris Pither third, Andrew Jones fourth and Todd Hazelwood rounding out the top 5.

2016 saw the introduction of the Car of the Future' specifications for the series, which saw 11 COTF cars starting the race and 11 older spec cars. It was the newer spec car which took Pole Position for the 250 km race with Prodrive Racing Australia's Garry Jacobson claiming top spot over duel Bathurst 250 km race winner Paul Dumbrell. The 2016 race only saw one safety car period with 20 out of the 22 cars seeing the finish line, with Eggleston Motorsport's Paul Dumbrell winning his third straight Bathurst 250 km race, even though he was racing the older spec Commodore. Pole sitter Garry Jacobson followed Dumbrell home with Paul Morris Motorsport's Anton De Pasquale claiming his first podium finish in the series in third. In 2017 the event was run as a non-championship event in order to encourage Dunlop Super2 teams to enter wildcards into the 2017 Supercheap Auto Bathurst 1000. This did not eventuate, and instead several teams decided to sit out the Bathurst 250, leading to a small field and the decision being made that the event would return to the championship in 2018. The race itself was won by Macauley Jones, his first in the Super2 category, for Brad Jones Racing with cousin Andrew Jones finishing third.

A late-race safety car, combined with a time-certain finish, only allowed for a one-lap dash after the final restart in the 2018 race. Going into the final lap, defending winner Macauley Jones led Garry Jacobson but the pair clashed into The Chase as Jacobson attempted to take the lead. Jones spun into the gravel and Jacobson slowed with damage, granting victory to Dean Fiore for MW Motorsport. Fiore himself had come under investigation for an early-race clash that ended Paul Dumbrell's race, however he was cleared after the race. Two-time 24 Hours of Le Mans winner Earl Bamber made a guest series appearance in the race, co-driving with Brenton Grove. In 2019, Bryce Fullwood dominated much of the race only to be given a post-race time penalty for setting a lap record under yellow flags, awarding the victory to Tickford Racing's Thomas Randle.

The 2020 Super2 Series had a limited calendar due to the COVID-19 pandemic and the Bathurst 1000 endurance event was replaced by two sprint races.

== Winners ==
Events which were not series rounds are indicated by a pink background.

Year	Event	Driver(s)	Team	Car
2001	Konica V8 Supercar Challenge	(Australia) Wayne Wakefield	Graphic Skills Racing	Holden VS Commodore
2002	Konica V8 Supercar Challenge	(Australia) Luke Youlden	Steven Ellery Racing	Ford AU Falcon
2003	Konica V8 Supercar Challenge	(Australia) Mark Winterbottom	Stone Brothers Racing	Ford AU Falcon
2004	Konica Minolta V8 Supercar Challenge	(Australia) Matthew White	MW Motorsport	Ford AU Falcon
2005 – 2013	not held			
2014	Wilson MedicOne Enduro	(Australia) Paul Dumbrell	Eggleston Motorsport	Holden VE Commodore
2015	Supercars Dunlop Series Bathurst 250	(Australia) Paul Dumbrell	Eggleston Motorsport	Holden VE Commodore
2016	V8 Supercars Dunlop Series Bathurst 250	(Australia) Paul Dumbrell	Eggleston Motorsport	Holden VE Commodore
2017	Dunlop Super2 Series Bathurst 250	(Australia) Macauley Jones	Brad Jones Racing	Holden VF Commodore
2018	Dunlop Super2 Series Bathurst 250	(Australia) Dean Fiore	MW Motorsport	Nissan L33 Altima
2019	Dunlop Super2 Series Bathurst 250	(Australia) Thomas Randle	Tickford Racing	Ford FG X Falcon

== Multiple winners ==
=== By driver ===
Race Wins	Driver	Years
3	(Australia) Paul Dumbrell	2014, 2015, 2016

=== By team ===
Race Wins	Manufacturer
3	Eggleston Motorsport
2	MW Motorsport

=== By manufacturer ===
Race Wins	Manufacturer
5	Holden
4	Ford

== See also ==
- Bathurst 1000
- Dunlop Super2 Series
