= Kurt Kostecki =

Australian racing driver (born 1998)

- Nationality: Australian
- Born: Kurt Michael Kostecki; 4 July 1998 (age 28) Perth, Western Australia
- Relatives: Jake Kostecki (brother); Brodie Kostecki (cousin)

Super2 Series career
- Debut season: 2014
- Current team: Kostecki Brothers Racing
- Categorisation: FIA Silver
- Car number: 55
- Former teams: MW Motorsport; RSport Engineering; Triple Eight Race Engineering
- Starts: 80
- Wins: 0
- Podiums: 9
- Poles: 2
- Best finish: 2nd in 2019

Supercars Championship career
- Current team: Tickford Racing (Endurance race co-driver)
- Championships: 0
- Races: 20
- Wins: 0
- Podiums: 0
- Pole positions: 0

Kurt Michael Kostecki (born 4 July 1998) is an Australian racing driver of Ukrainian descent.

== Biography ==
=== Australia ===
==== Super2 Series ====
In December 2014, Kostecki became one of the youngest people to drive a V8 Supercar when, at the age of 16, he debuted in the Dunlop Series support race for the Sydney 500 for MW Motorsport. Failing to finish his first race and finishing 19th in the second, he was picked up by RSport. His season lasted four rounds, but with a best result of 14th, he stepped down from the drive to focus on school studies and was replaced with privateer Phil Woodbury. The Kostecki family purchased two Gen2 Holden VF Commodore chassis from Triple Eight Race Engineering (who Kurt worked for as a third mechanic), running Kurt and brother Jake from 2016 onwards. His fortunes improved with six top-ten finishes (including two fourth placings) and 16th in the championship. He finished eighth in the 2017 Super2 Series and is also competing full time in the 2018 Super2 Series. In 2019 he switched to Triple Eight Race Engineering finishing second in the championship.

==== Supercars Championship ====
In 2016, Kostecki was also gifted the unusual opportunity to drive for Team 18 at the Townsville and Ipswich rounds of the championship following extensive damage to the teams' original chassis and injury to driver Lee Holdsworth, seeing as he could provide the team a spare chassis. At Townsville he finished 25th in Race One and DNFed in Race Two, and in Ipswich he finished 23rd in Race One and 21st in Race Two.

For 2018, Kostecki is entered as a wildcard at round 9 at Queensland Raceway and round 11 The Bend SuperSprint driving a Holden VF Commodore.

=== United States ===
Kostecki was initially slated to run the second half of the 2014 NASCAR K&N Pro Series East alongside his cousin Brodie Kostecki, however this plan did not come to fruition.

== Career results ==
=== Career summary ===
Season	Series	Position	Team	Car
2012	Australian National Sprint Kart - Junior Clubman	6th		
2014	Dunlop V8 Supercar Series	46th	MW Motorsport	Ford FG Falcon
2015	V8 Supercars Dunlop Series	24th	Rsport Race Engineering	Holden VE Commodore
2015	V8 Ute Racing Series	37th	Matt Stone Racing	Ford FG Falcon XR8 Ute
2016	Supercars Dunlop Series	16th	Kostecki Brothers Racing	Holden VF Commodore
2016	International V8 Supercars Championship	55th	Team 18	Holden VF Commodore
2017	Dunlop Super2 Series	8th	Kostecki Brothers Racing	Holden VF Commodore
2018	Dunlop Super2 Series	8th	Kostecki Brothers Racing	Holden VF Commodore
2018	Virgin Australia Supercars Championship	53rd	Kostecki Brothers Racing	Holden VF Commodore
2019	Dunlop Super2 Series	**2nd**	Triple Eight Race Engineering	Holden VF Commodore
2020	Dunlop Super2 Series	13th	Kostecki Brothers Racing	Holden VF Commodore
2020	Virgin Australia Supercars Championship	NC	Walkinshaw Andretti United	Holden ZB Commodore
2021	Repco Supercars Championship	26th	Walkinshaw Andretti United; Matt Stone Racing	Holden ZB Commodore
2022	Repco Supercars Championship	47th	Tickford Racing	Ford Mustang GT

=== Complete Super2 Series results ===
(key) (Round results only)

Super2 Series results
Year	Team	No.	Car	1	2	3	4	5	6	7	8	9	10	11	12	13	14	15	16	17	18	19	20	21	Position	Points
2014	MW Motorsport	28	Ford FG Falcon	ADE; R1	ADE; R2	WIN; R3	WIN; R4	BAR; R5	BAR; R6	TOW; R7	TOW; R8	QLD; R9	QLD; R10	BAT; R11	HOM; R12; Ret	HOM; R13; 19									46th	48
2015	RSport Engineering	4	Holden VE Commodore	ADE; R1; 25	ADE; R2; 24	BAR; R3; 17	BAR; R4; 20	BAR; R5; 16	WIN; R6; 16	WIN; R7; 22	WIN; R8; 14	TOW; R9; 21	TOW; R10; Ret	QLD; R11	QLD; R12	QLD; R13	BAT; R14	HOM; R15	HOM; R16						24th	290
2016	Kostecki Brothers Racing	55	Holden VF Commodore	ADE; R1; 18	ADE; R2; 20	PHI; R3; 12	PHI; R4; 8	PHI; R5; 8	BAR; R6; 12	BAR; R7; 4	BAR; R8; 13	TOW; R9	TOW; R10	SAN; R11; 6	SAN; R12; 4	SAN; R13; 10	BAT; R14; 14	HOM; R15; Ret	HOM; R16; Ret						16th	733
2017	Kostecki Brothers Racing	55	Holden VF Commodore	ADE; R1; 17	ADE; R2; 10	ADE; R3; Ret	SYM; R4; 9	SYM; R5; 7	SYM; R6; 9	SYM; R7; 15	PHI; R8; Ret	PHI; R9; 11	PHI; R10; 9	PHI; R11; 7	TOW; R12; 11	TOW; R13; 4	SYD; R14; 10	SYD; R15; 14	SYD; R16; 10	SYD; R17; 16	SAN; R18; 7	SAN; R19; 4	NEW; R20; 15	NEW; R21; 6	8th	1083
2018	Kostecki Brothers Racing	55	Holden VF Commodore	ADE; R1; 3	ADE; R2; 3	ADE; R3; 4	SYM; R4; 5	SYM; R5; 6	SYM; R6; 4	BAR; R7; 4	BAR; R8; 15	BAR; R9; 3	TOW; R10; 13	TOW; R11; 4	SAN; R12; 20	SAN; R13; 19	BAT; R14; Ret	NEW; R 18	NEW; R C						8th	1010
2019	Triple Eight Race Engineering	55	Holden VF Commodore	ADE; R1; Ret	ADE; R2; DSQ	ADE; R3; 10	BAR; R4; 6	BAR; R5; 3	**TOW**; **R6**; 2	TOW; R7; 4	QLD; R8; 3	**QLD**; **R9**; 3	BAT; R10; 3	SAN; R11; 2	SAN; R12; 5	NEW; R13; 5	NEW; R14; 4								2nd	1502
2020	Kostecki Brothers Racing	55	Holden VF Commodore	ADE; R1; 4	ADE; R2; 11	ADE; R3; 8	SYD; R4	SYD; R5	BAT; R6	BAT; R7															13th	188

=== Supercars Championship results ===
(key) (Races in bold indicate pole position) (Races in italics indicate fastest lap)

Supercars results
Year	Team	No.	Car	1	2	3	4	5	6	7	8	9	10	11	12	13	14	15	16	17	18	19	20	21	22	23	24	25	26	27	28	29	30	31	32	33	34	Position	Points
2016	Team 18	18	Holden VF Commodore	ADE; R1	ADE; R2	ADE; R3	SYM; R4	SYM; R5	PHI; R6	PHI; R7	BAR; R8	BAR; R9	WIN; R10	WIN; R11	HID; R12	HID; R13	TOW; R14; 25	TOW; R15; Ret	QLD; R16; 23	QLD; R17; 21	SMP; R18	SMP; R19	SAN; R20	BAT; R21	SUR; R22	SUR; R23	PUK; R24	PUK; R25	PUK; R26	PUK; R27	SYD; R28	SYD; R29						55th	108
2018	Kostecki Brothers Racing	42	Holden VF Commodore	ADE; R1	ADE; R2	MEL; R3	MEL; R4	MEL; R5	MEL; R6	SYM; R7	SYM; R8	PHI; R9	PHI; R10	BAR; R11	BAR; R12	WIN; R13	WIN; R14	HID; R15	HID; R16	TOW; R17	TOW; R18	QLD; R19; 25	QLD; R20; 23	SMP; R21	BEN; R22; 27	BEN; R23; Ret	SAN; QR	SAN; R24	BAT; R25	SUR; R26	SUR; R27	PUK; R28	PUK; R29	NEW; R30	NEW; R31			53rd	90
2020	Walkinshaw Andretti United	2	Holden ZB Commodore	ADE; R1	ADE; R2	MEL; R3	MEL; R4	MEL; R5	MEL; R6	SMP1; R7	SMP1; R8	SMP1; R9	SMP2; R10	SMP2; R11	SMP2; R12	HID1; R13	HID1; R14	HID1; R15	HID2; R16	HID2; R17	HID2; R18	TOW1; R19	TOW1; R20	TOW1; R21	TOW2; R22	TOW2; R23	TOW2; R24	BEN1; R25	BEN1; R26	BEN1; R27	BEN2; R28	BEN2; R29; PO	BEN2; R30; PO	BAT; R31; Ret				NC	0
2021	Walkinshaw Andretti United	27	Holden ZB Commodore	BAT1; R1	BAT1; R2	SAN; R3	SAN; R4	SAN; R5	SYM; R6	SYM; R7	SYM; R8	BEN; R9; 19	BEN; R10; 16	BEN; R11; 23	HID; R12; 6	HID; R13; 23	HID; R14; 17	TOW1; R15	TOW1; R16	TOW2; R17	TOW2; R18	TOW2; R19	SMP1; R20	SMP1; R21	SMP1; R22	SMP2; R23; 25	SMP2; R24; 21	SMP2; R25; 21	SMP3; R26	SMP3; R27	SMP3; R28							26th	434
2021	Matt Stone Racing	34	Holden ZB Commodore																													SMP4; R29; PO	SMP4; R30; PO	BAT2; R31; 13				26th	434
2022	Tickford Racing	56	Ford Mustang S550	SMP; R1	SMP; R2	SYM; R3	SYM; R4	SYM; R5	MEL; R6	MEL; R7	MEL; R8	MEL; R9	BAR; R10	BAR; R11	BAR; R12	WIN; R13	WIN; R14	WIN; R15	HID; R16	HID; R17	HID; R18	TOW; R19	TOW; R20	BEN; R21	BEN; R22	BEN; R23	SAN; R24; PO	SAN; R25; PO	SAN; R26; PO	PUK; R27	PUK; R28	PUK; R29	BAT; R30; 17	SUR; R31	SUR; R32	ADE; R33	ADE; R34	47th	108

=== Complete Bathurst 12 Hour results ===
Year	Team	Co-drivers	Car	Class	Laps	Overall position	Class position
2020	(Australia) Hobson Motorsport/GWR	(Australia) Brett Hobson (Australia) Garth Walden	Nissan GT-R Nismo GT3 (2015)	Silver	288	21st	5th

=== Complete Bathurst 1000 results ===
Year	Team	Car	Co-driver	Position	Laps
2020	Walkinshaw Andretti United	Holden Commodore ZB	(Australia) Bryce Fullwood	DNF	147
2021	Matt Stone Racing	Holden Commodore ZB	(Australia) Jake Kostecki	13th	161
2022	Tickford Racing	Ford Mustang Mk.6	(Australia) Jake Kostecki	17th	161
