= Kostecki Brothers Racing =

Australian racer team

- Manufacturer: Holden
- Race Drivers: 55. Kurt Kostecki
- Chassis: VF Commodore
- Debut: Supercars: 2018; Super2: 2016; Kumho Tyre Series: 2015 Kumho Tyres Australian V8 Touring Car Series
- Drivers' Championships: 0
- Round wins: 4
- Pole positions: 2
- 2020 position: 13th (Kurt Kostecki)

Kostecki Brothers Racing was an Australian motor racing team which is competed in the Dunlop Super2 Series. The team was formed in 2015 to run a car in the Kumho Tyre Series for Jake Kostecki. As the name suggests the team was formed to promote the careers of Jake and his brother Kurt Kostecki and their cousin Brodie Kostecki. After Jake and Brodie moved into the main Supercars series and Kurt's career faded the team was wound up during the COVID pandemic in 2020.

== Super 2 Series ==
For 2016 the team debuted in the Dunlop Super 2 Series, entering a pair of VF Commodores built by Triple Eight Race Engineering for brothers Jake and Kurt Kostecki. Both drivers struggled all season with Kurt finishing 16th in the championship after missing the Townsville round due to his Supercars Championship debut with Team 18. Jake meanwhile would finish 18th in the series standings, with a best finish of 11th, achieved at Sandown and Homebush.

The team would continue with the same cars and driver lineup for the 2017 Dunlop Super 2 Series. Kurt would have a better year, finishing inside the top 10 ten times on his way to 9th in the standings. Jake would have a difficult year, taking only 3 top tens and missing the final round in Newcastle to finish 22nd in the championship

For 2018 the team would add Brodie Kostecki, cousin of Jake and Kurt in a third VF Commodore. Brodie would finish the highest of the three, taking 3 wins, including his first 2 wins to sweep the round at Sandown as well as 3 other podiums, finishing 5th in the championship. Kurt would secure his first podium in the series at Adelaide, taking 2 other podiums to finish 8th in the championship. Jake would struggle again, his best result being a pair of 6th places at Sandown. He would finish in 18th.

2019 would see Jake and Brodie stay with the team, with Kurt taking his car to Triple Eight Race Engineering. Brodie would win the second race at Adelaide and finish 2nd in the third. He would score decent results at Barbagallo, before withdrawing from the season to concentrate on the teams endurance series campaign. Jake would also achieve solid results, withdrawing from the series after the Queensland round to focus on the teams endurance series campaign.

For 2020 the team would downsize again, Kurt would bring his car back to the family team with the intention to compete in the whole series. However due to the 2020 Coronavirus Pandemic, he would withdraw from the series after the first round in Adelaide.

== Supercars Championship ==
Kostecki Brothers Racing would make their Supercars Championship Debut as a wildcard at the 2018 Ipswich SuperSprint, entering Kurt Kostecki in his Super 2 VF Commodore. Kurt would also enter The Bend Supersprint event as a wildcard, achieving modest results. He would finish 53rd, and last in the championship, being the only driver to compete in only 2 events.

For the 2019 Pirtek Enduro Cup, the team would enter a ZB Commodore as a wildcard for all 3 events for Jake & Brodie Kostecki. They would retire from the Bathurst 1000 after crashing out at Reid Park towards the end of the race. The team would fare better at Surfers Paradise, finishing 18th and 16th in the two races. They would achieve their best result at Sandown, with Brodie finishing 8th in his qualifying race, with the pair going on to finish 16th in the feature race.

== Kumho Tyre Series ==
Kostecki Brothers Racing was formed in 2015, Entering an ex-Triple Eight Race Engineering BF Falcon for Jake Kostecki, the team was entered under the name of sponsors Arcoplate & Penrite Oils. Kostecki competed in rounds 1 through 4, achieving modest results and finishing 9th in the championship, despite missing a round.

== Results ==
=== Australian V8 Touring Car ===
Year	No.	Driver	Car	SAN (Victoria (state))			WIN (Victoria (state))			QLD (Queensland)			PHI (Victoria (state))			SMP (New South Wales)	Pen.	Pts.	Pos.
2015	56	(Australia) Jake Kostecki	Ford BF Falcon	14	7	8	4	4	Ret	4	4	Ret	Ret	6	5		0	210	9th

=== Super 2 ===
Year	No.	Driver	Car	ADE (South Australia)		PHI (Victoria (state))			BAR (Western Australia)			TOW (Queensland)		SAN (Victoria (state))			BAT (New South Wales)	SYD (New South Wales)		Pen.	Pts.	Pos.
2016	55	(Australia) Kurt Kostecki	Holden VF Commodore	18	20	12	8	8	12	4	13			6	4	10	14	Ret	Ret	25	733	16th
2016	56	(Australia) Jake Kostecki	Holden VF Commodore	Ret	18	20	19	24	18	15	21	12	13	Ret	13	11	19	18	11	0	683	18th

Year	No.	Driver	Car	ADE (South Australia)			SYM (Tasmania)				PHI (Victoria (state))				TOW (Queensland)		SMP (New South Wales)				SAN (Victoria (state))		NEW (New South Wales)		Pen.	Pts.	Pos.
2017	55	(Australia) Kurt Kostecki	Holden VF Commodore	17	10	Ret	9	7	9	15	Ret	11	9	7	11	4	10	14	10	16	7	4	15	6	0	1083	8th
2017	56	(Australia) Jake Kostecki	Holden VF Commodore	Ret	14	10	14	Ret	14	9	13	9	11	23	13	Ret	18	16	11	21	14	Ret			0	564	22nd

Year	No.	Driver	Car	ADE (South Australia)			SYM (Tasmania)			BAR (Western Australia)			TOW (Queensland)		SAN (Victoria (state))		BAT (New South Wales)	NEW (New South Wales)		Pen.	Pts.	Pos.
2018	55	(Australia) Kurt Kostecki	Holden VF Commodore	3	3	4	5	6	4	4	15	3	13	4	20	19	Ret	18	C	0	1010	7th
2018	56	(Australia) Jake Kostecki	Holden VF Commodore	9	Ret	9	Ret	13	17	10	9	8	10	14	6	6	Ret	9	C	70	719	18th
2018	57	(Australia) Brodie Kostecki	Holden VF Commodore	7	8	5	4	2	6	3	16	Ret	7	3	1	1	Ret	1	C	0	1202	5th

Year	No.	Driver	Car	ADE (South Australia)			BAR (Western Australia)		TOW (Queensland)		QLD (Queensland)		BAT (New South Wales)	SAN (Victoria (state))	NEW (New South Wales)	Pen.	Pts.	Pos.
2019	56	(Australia) Jake Kostecki	Holden VF Commodore	5	7	6	7	6	Ret	7	4	6				0	722	16th
2019	57	(Australia) Brodie Kostecki	Holden VF Commodore	4	1	2	18	5								0	434	18th

=== Supercars ===
Year	No.	Driver	Car	ADE (South Australia)	MEL (Victoria (state))	SYM (Tasmania)	PHI (Victoria (state))	BAR (Western Australia)	WIN (Victoria (state))	HID (Northern Territory)	TOW (Queensland)	QLD (Queensland)		SMP (New South Wales)	BEN (South Australia)		SAN (Victoria (state))	BAT (New South Wales)	SUR (Queensland)	PUK (New Zealand)	NEW (New South Wales)	Pen.	Team Points	Team Pos.
2018	42	(Australia) Kurt Kostecki	Holden Commodore VF									25	23		27	Ret						0	90	18th

Pos.	Driver	No.	ADE (South Australia)	MEL (Victoria (state))	SYM (Tasmania)	PHI (Victoria (state))	BAR (Western Australia)	WIN (Victoria (state))	HID (Northern Territory)	TOW (Queensland)	QLD (Queensland)	BEN (South Australia)	PUK (New Zealand)	BAT (New South Wales)	SUR (Queensland)		SAN (Victoria (state))			NEW (New South Wales)	Pen.	Team Points	Team Pos.
2019	(Australia) Brodie Kostecki (Australia) Jake Kostecki	Holden Commodore ZB												Ret	18	16	21	8	16		0	247	17th

== Drivers ==
=== Supercars Drivers ===
- (Australia) Kurt Kostecki (2018)
- (Australia) Jake Kostecki (2019)
- (Australia) Brodie Kostecki (2019)

=== Super2 Drivers ===
- (Australia) Kurt Kostecki (2016-18)
- (Australia) Jake Kostecki (2016-19)
- (Australia) Brodie Kostecki (2018-19)

=== Super3 Drivers ===
- (Australia) Jake Kostecki (2015)
