= 2008 Australian Formula Ford Championship =

Motor racing competition

Seasons
- ← 2007 2009 →

The 2008 Australian Formula Ford Championship was a CAMS sanctioned motor racing title for drivers of Formula Ford racing cars. The championship was contested over an eight-round series with three races per round. It was the sixteenth Australian Formula Ford Championship.

The championship was won by Paul Laskazeski driving a Spectrum 011b for Synergy Motorsport.

== Teams and drivers ==
Team	Chassis	No	Driver	Rounds
Walkinshaw Racing	Mygale SJ07A	2	(Australia) Nick Percat	All
Aust. Dealer Insurance	Mygale SJ07A	3	(Australia) Lucas Dumbrell	All
Sonic Motor Racing Services	Mygale SJ07A	4	(Australia) Ben Small	1
Sonic Motor Racing Services	Mygale SJ07A	4	(Australia) Kristian Lindbom	2–8
Mygale Australia	Mygale SJ07A	5	(New Zealand) Martin Short	3, 5
Synergy Motorsport	Spectrum 011b	7	(Australia) Paul Laskazeski	All
Synergy Motorsport	Spectrum 011c	16	(Australia) Ryan Simpson	7
Synergy Motorsport	Spectrum 011c	21	(Australia) Ryan Simpson	8
Synergy Motorsport	Spectrum 011c	43	(Australia) Chris Goodman	7–8
Synergy Motorsport	Spectrum 011	48	(Australia) Jessica Golding	2–3, 5
Ray Chamberlain	Van Diemen RF06	8	(Australia) Ray Chamberlain	7
CXC Consultants Exchange	Mygale SJ06A	12	(Australia) Robert Munnerley	1–3
Minda Motorsport	Spectrum 011b	12	(New Zealand) Andrew Waite	4
Minda Motorsport	Spectrum 011b	66	(New Zealand) Andrew Waite	6
Minda Motorsport	Spectrum 011b	66	(Australia) Glen Wood	7–8
Steeline Metal Framing Systems	Van Diemen RF04	13	(Australia) Nick Foster	All
Anglo Australian Motorsport	Comtek Spirit WL06	14	(Australia) Nicholas Tanti	2, 5, 8
Anglo Australian Motorsport	Comtek Spirit WL07	16	(Australia) Rob Storey	1–3, 5, 8
Howard Racing	Spectrum 011	15	(Australia) Chaz Mostert	All
Howard Racing	Spectrum 011	27	(Australia) Scott Auld	1–3, 5
Borland Racing Developments	Spectrum 011b	19	(Australia) Scott Pye	All
Borland Racing Developments	Spectrum 011b	23	(Australia) Daniel Erickson	All
Borland Racing Developments	Spectrum 011d	71	(Australia) Nathan Morcom	7–8
Borland Racing Developments	Spectrum 011b	98	(Australia) Jake Chapman	1–7
Borland Racing Developments	Spectrum 011b	98	(Australia) Luke Ellery	8
Britek Motorsport	Spectrum 011c	25	(Australia) Ben Walter	All
Britek Motorsport	Spectrum 011b	26	(Australia) Taylor Gore	1–2, 6
Britek Motorsport	Spectrum 011b	26	(New Zealand) Andrew Waite	5
Britek Motorsport	Spectrum 011b	26	(Australia) Jesse Dixon	7
Britek Motorsport	Spectrum 011b	26	(Australia) Daniel Lewis	8
Britek Motorsport	Spectrum 011c	63	(Australia) Martin Swindells	1–7
Britek Motorsport	Spectrum 011b	66	(Australia) Adam Graham	1–5
Monza Motors	Mygale SJ08A	30	(Australia) Trent Harrison	1–4, 6, 8
Rob Spence Motorsport	Spectrum 011c	35	(Australia) Cameron Spence	1–3, 6
Lowe Earthmoving	Spectrum 011c	41	(Australia) Brad Lowe	1–6
Icon Motorsport	Spectrum 011c	43	(Australia) Ben Morley	1–6
Geoffrey I'Anson	Van Diemen RF06	44	(Australia) Roger I'Anson	6
G-Force Motorsport	Mygale SJ08A	46	(New Zealand) Richie Stanaway	8
No Sponsor Racing	Van Diemen RF04	74	(Australia) Yudi Doyle	1–3, 6
Autobarn Virginia	Spectrum 011b	77	(Australia) Blake Varney	1–5
Ben Forgan	Spectrum 011b	86	(Australia) Ben Forgan	4

== Championship schedule ==
Round	Circuit	Dates	Supporting	Map
1	(New South Wales) Eastern Creek Raceway	7–9 March	V8 Supercar Championship Series	2008 Australian Formula Ford Championship is located in Australia
2	(New South Wales) Wakefield Park Raceway	4–6 April	Fujitsu V8 Supercar Series	2008 Australian Formula Ford Championship is located in Australia
3	(Victoria (state)) Sandown Raceway	7–9 June	V8 Supercar Championship Series; Fujitsu V8 Supercar Series	2008 Australian Formula Ford Championship is located in Australia
4	(Northern Territory) Hidden Valley Raceway	4–6 July	V8 Supercar Championship Series	2008 Australian Formula Ford Championship is located in Australia
5	Queensland Raceway	18–20 July	V8 Supercar Championship Series; Fujitsu V8 Supercar Series	2008 Australian Formula Ford Championship is located in Australia
6	(Victoria (state)) Phillip Island Grand Prix Circuit	12–14 September	V8 Supercar Championship Series	2008 Australian Formula Ford Championship is located in Australia
7	(Tasmania) Symmons Plains Raceway	22-23 November	V8 Supercar Championship Series	2008 Australian Formula Ford Championship is located in Australia
8	(New South Wales) Oran Park Raceway	5–7 December	V8 Supercar Championship Series; Fujitsu V8 Supercar Series	2008 Australian Formula Ford Championship is located in Australia

== Season summary ==
Rd	Race	Circuit	Pole position	Fastest lap	Winning driver	Winning team	Round Winner
1	1	(New South Wales) Eastern Creek Raceway	(Australia) Nick Percat	(Australia) Brad Lowe	(Australia) Brad Lowe	Lowe Earthmoving	(Australia) Brad Lowe
1	2	(New South Wales) Eastern Creek Raceway		(Australia) Paul Laskazeski	(Australia) Brad Lowe	Lowe Earthmoving	(Australia) Brad Lowe
1	3	(New South Wales) Eastern Creek Raceway		(Australia) Ben Morley	(Australia) Nick Percat	Walkinshaw Racing	(Australia) Brad Lowe
2	1	(New South Wales) Wakefield Park Raceway	(Australia) Paul Laskazeski	(Australia) Adam Graham	(Australia) Kristian Lindbom	Sonic Motor Racing Services	(Australia) Kristian Lindbom
2	2	(New South Wales) Wakefield Park Raceway		(Australia) Paul Laskazeski	(Australia) Rob Storey	Anglo Australian Motorsport	(Australia) Kristian Lindbom
2	3	(New South Wales) Wakefield Park Raceway		(Australia) Paul Laskazeski	(Australia) Paul Laskazeski	Synergy Motorsport	(Australia) Kristian Lindbom
3	1	(Victoria (state)) Sandown Raceway	(Australia) Paul Laskazeski	(Australia) Paul Laskazeski	(Australia) Paul Laskazeski	Synergy Motorsport	(Australia) Paul Laskazeski
3	2	(Victoria (state)) Sandown Raceway		(Australia) Paul Laskazeski	(Australia) Paul Laskazeski	Synergy Motorsport	(Australia) Paul Laskazeski
3	3	(Victoria (state)) Sandown Raceway		(Australia) Paul Laskazeski	(Australia) Jake Chapman	Borland Racing Developments	(Australia) Paul Laskazeski
4	1	(Northern Territory) Hidden Valley Raceway	(Australia) Ben Morley	(Australia) Daniel Erickson	(Australia) Nick Percat	Walkinshaw Racing	(Australia) Nick Percat
4	2	(Northern Territory) Hidden Valley Raceway		(Australia) Scott Pye	(Australia) Nick Percat	Walkinshaw Racing	(Australia) Nick Percat
4	3	(Northern Territory) Hidden Valley Raceway		(Australia) Daniel Erickson	(Australia) Nick Percat	Walkinshaw Racing	(Australia) Nick Percat
5	1	Queensland Raceway	(Australia) Nick Percat	(Australia) Kristian Lindbom	(Australia) Nick Percat	Walkinshaw Racing	(Australia) Nick Percat
5	2	Queensland Raceway		(Australia) Kristian Lindbom	(Australia) Nick Percat	Walkinshaw Racing	(Australia) Nick Percat
5	3	Queensland Raceway		(Australia) Nick Percat	(Australia) Nick Percat	Walkinshaw Racing	(Australia) Nick Percat
6	1	(Victoria (state)) Phillip Island Grand Prix Circuit	(Australia) Daniel Erickson	(Australia) Daniel Erickson	(Australia) Daniel Erickson	Borland Racing Developments	(Australia) Paul Laskazeski
6	2	(Victoria (state)) Phillip Island Grand Prix Circuit		(Australia) Daniel Erickson	(Australia) Daniel Erickson	Borland Racing Developments	(Australia) Paul Laskazeski
6	3	(Victoria (state)) Phillip Island Grand Prix Circuit		(Australia) Nick Percat	(Australia) Paul Laskazeski	Synergy Motorsport	(Australia) Paul Laskazeski
7	1	(Tasmania) Symmons Plains Raceway	(Australia) Paul Laskazeski	(Australia) Daniel Erickson	(Australia) Glen Wood	Minda Motorsport	(Australia) Nick Percat
7	2	(Tasmania) Symmons Plains Raceway		(Australia) Paul Laskazeski	(Australia) Nick Percat	Walkinshaw Racing	(Australia) Nick Percat
7	3	(Tasmania) Symmons Plains Raceway		(Australia) Daniel Erickson	(Australia) Nick Percat	Walkinshaw Racing	(Australia) Nick Percat
8	1	(New South Wales) Oran Park Raceway	(Australia) Paul Laskazeski	Race cancelled			(Australia) Daniel Erickson
8	2	(New South Wales) Oran Park Raceway		(Australia) Paul Laskazeski	(Australia) Paul Laskazeski	Synergy Motorsport	(Australia) Daniel Erickson
8	3	(New South Wales) Oran Park Raceway		(Australia) Daniel Erickson	(Australia) Daniel Erickson	Borland Racing Developments	(Australia) Daniel Erickson

== Points system ==
Championship points were awarded on a 20-16-14-12-10-8-6-4-2-1 basis to the top ten finishers in each race and a bonus point was awarded to the driver achieving pole position for the first race at each round.

== Championship standings ==
Pos.	Driver	(New South Wales) EAS			(New South Wales) WAK			(Victoria (state)) SAN			(Northern Territory) DAR			(Queensland) QUE			(Victoria (state)) PHI			(Tasmania) SYM			(New South Wales) ORA			Pts
Pos.	Driver	R1	R2	R3	R1	R2	R3	R1	R2	R3	R1	R2	R3	R1	R2	R3	R1	R2	R3	R1	R2	R3	R1	R2	R3	Pts
1	(Australia) Paul Laskazeski	2	3	4	12	3	1	1	1	2	2	2	2	3	4	3	3	2	1	Ret	2	2	C	1	2	342
2	(Australia) Nick Percat	5	7	1	4	4	Ret	12	Ret	Ret	1	1	1	1	1	1	2	3	7	3	1	1	C	5	4	274
3	(Australia) Kristian Lindbom				1	2	2	8	5	5	6	6	4	2	2	2	12	11	4	4	4	6	C	4	3	222
4	(Australia) Daniel Erickson	4	5	7	6	8	Ret	4	13	8	3	14	10	8	5	4	1	1	Ret	5	Ret	3	C	2	1	198
5	(Australia) Ben Morley	3	2	2	2	5	18	5	Ret	7	4	3	6	5	6	6	14	Ret	9							151
6	(Australia) Adam Graham	9	4	5	5	6	Ret	3	3	4	7	4	5	4	3	5										146
7	(Australia) Scott Pye	11	8	Ret	Ret	7	4	2	2	3	5	5	3	Ret	9	8	5	15	6	Ret	Ret	7	C	6	5	137
8	(Australia) Brad Lowe	1	1	3	14	13	Ret	11	Ret	6	13	Ret	Ret	7	7	7	6	5	10							99
9	(Australia) Jake Chapman	6	14	Ret	Ret	18	12	7	4	1	10	12	14	9	13	Ret	4	4	2	2	Ret	11				90
10	(Australia) Rob Storey	Ret	12	8	3	1	3	6	Ret	17				16	17	16							C	8	9	52
11	(Australia) Chaz Mostert	Ret	17	12	Ret	15	10	Ret	14	11	11	11	Ret	Ret	15	11	10	6	8	11	5	5	C	3	7	50
12	(Australia) Blake Varney	7	6	6	9	10	5	Ret	9	14	12	7	Ret	12	14	15										45
13	(Australia) Ben Walter	Ret	22	13	16	17	15	9	Ret	Ret	8	9	8	11	16	12	7	7	5	6	9	10	C	Ret	11	45
14	(Australia) Martin Swindells	16	16	11	7	16	6	10	6	Ret	14	16	13	Ret	19	18	11	14	3	Ret	11	12				39
15	(Australia) Ryan Simpson																			7	3	Ret	C	7	6	34
16	(Australia) Glen Wood																			1	Ret	8	C	10	8	29
17	(Australia) Scott Auld	10	11	10	10	11	7	14	8	Ret				6	8	17										27
18	(Australia) Trent Harrison	8	9	9	Ret	DNS	8	20	7	9	15	15	12				18	10	16				C	15	10	24
19	(Australia) Nathan Morcom																			9	6	4	C	12	12	22
20	(Australia) Lucas Dumbrell	Ret	15	Ret	8	14	16	Ret	12	10	16	13	9	15	10	13	9	16	13	8	Ret	9	C			16
21	(New Zealand) Andrew Waite										9	8	7	Ret	12	9	15	Ret	15							14
22	(Australia) Nick Foster	14	21	16	15	9	Ret	16	Ret	12	17	10	11	10	11	10	13	9	Ret	12	7	16	C	14	13	13
23	(Australia) Cameron Spence	Ret	18	18	13	19	14	13	10	16							8	8	Ret							9
24	(Australia) Chris Goodman																			Ret	8	13	C	9	Ret	6
25	(Australia) Nicholas Tanti				19	12	9							Ret	18	14							C	Ret	Ret	4
26	(Australia) Jesse Dixon																			10	Ret	14				1
27	(Australia) Ray Chamberlain																			13	10	15				1
-	(Australia) Ben Small	12	13	17																						0
-	(Australia) Taylor Gore	15	20	14	Ret	22	13										17	12	11							0
-	(Australia) Yudi Doyle	17	19	15	18	21	Ret	18	Ret	19							19	17	14							0
-	(Australia) Jessica Golding				17	23	17	19	Ret	18				14	20	19										0
-	(New Zealand) Martin Short							17	11	13				13	DNS	DNS										0
-	(Australia) Ben Forgan										Ret	Ret	15													0
-	(Australia) Roger I'Anson																16	13	12							0
-	(Australia) Luke Ellery																						C	11	Ret	0
-	(Australia) Daniel Lewis																						C	13	Ret	0
-	(New Zealand) Richie Stanaway																						C	Ret	14	0
-	(Australia) Robert Munnerley	13	10	Ret	11	20	11	15	Ret	15																-8
Pos.	Driver	(New South Wales) EAS			(New South Wales) WAK			(Victoria (state)) SAN			(Northern Territory) DAR			(Queensland) QUE			(Victoria (state)) PHI			(Tasmania) SYM			(New South Wales) ORA			Pts
Pos.	Driver	R1	R2	R3	R1	R2	R3	R1	R2	R3	R1	R2	R3	R1	R2	R3	R1	R2	R3	R1	R2	R3	R1	R2	R3	Pts

Notes:

- Race 1 of Round 8 was abandoned after an accident and no championship points were awarded.
- Nick Percat's Round 6 total includes a 20-point penalty for a driving infringement
- Jack Chapman's Round 7 total includes a 15-point penalty for a driving infringement
- Scott Pye's Round 7 total includes a 15-point penalty for a driving infringement
- Chaz Mostert's Round 4 total includes a 5-point penalty for a driving infringement
- Robert Munnerley's Round 1 total includes a 10-point penalty for a driving infringement
