= 2013 Dunlop V8 Supercar Series =

Motor racing competition

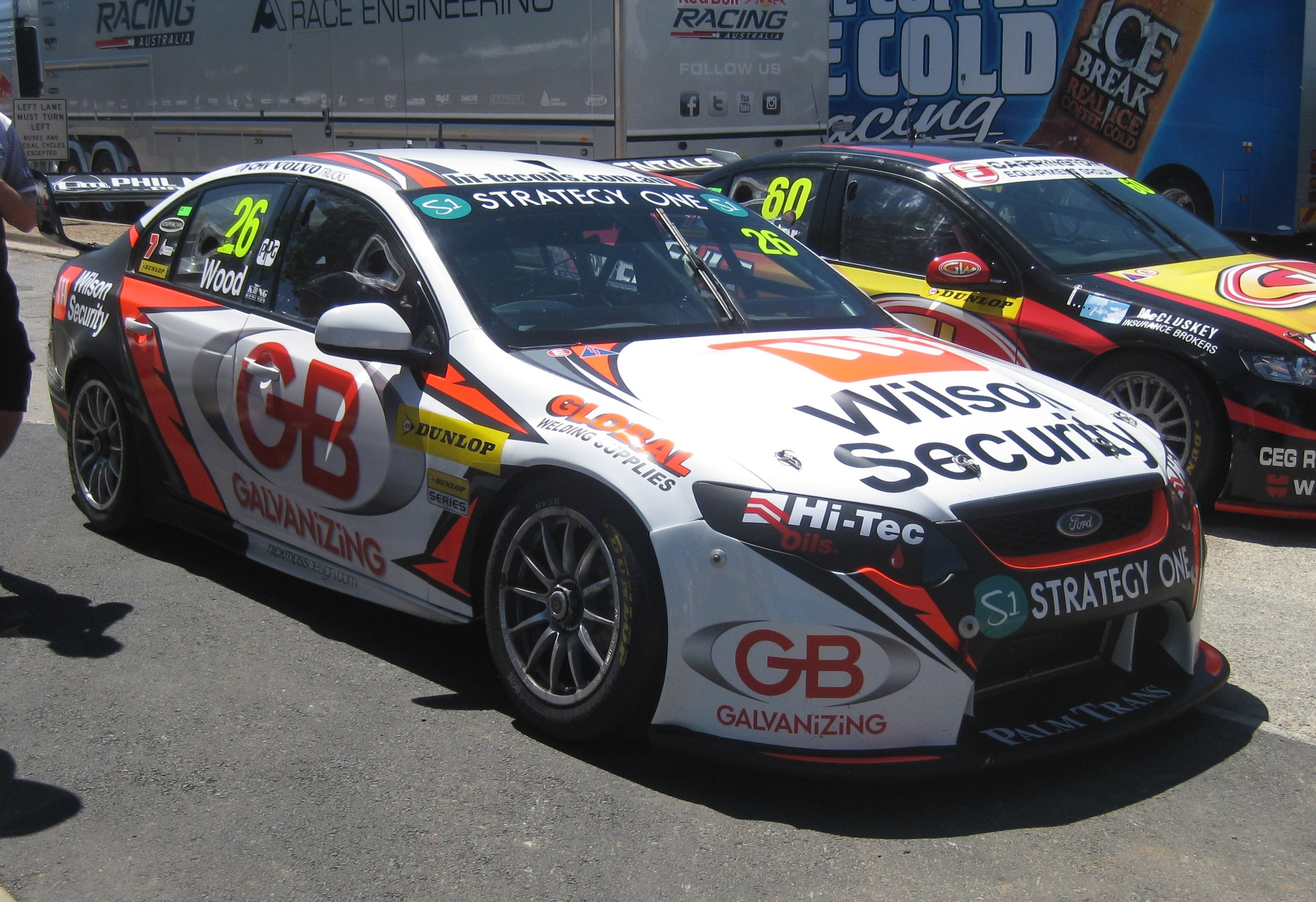
Dale Wood won the series driving a Ford FG Falcon for MW Motorsport.

The 2013 Dunlop Series was an Australian motor racing competition for V8 Supercars. It was the fourteenth running of a V8 Supercar Development Series, with all rounds held in support of 2013 International V8 Supercars Championship events.

The introduction of the "New Generation V8 Supercar" regulations to the V8 Supercar Championship resulted in a number of rule changes which affected the Dunlop Series. Teams were only allowed to compete with one model of the cars raced in V8 Supercars. All teams competing with Fords upgraded to the FG Falcon, whilst the Holden teams continued to use the VE Commodore. With all V8 Supercar teams building brand-new chassis for the 2013 season to comply with the New Generation V8 Supercar regulations, many of the cars they used in the 2012 Supercars Championship were sold to Dunlop Series teams.

Dale Wood won the 2013 series driving a Ford FG Falcon for MW Motorsport.

== Teams and drivers ==
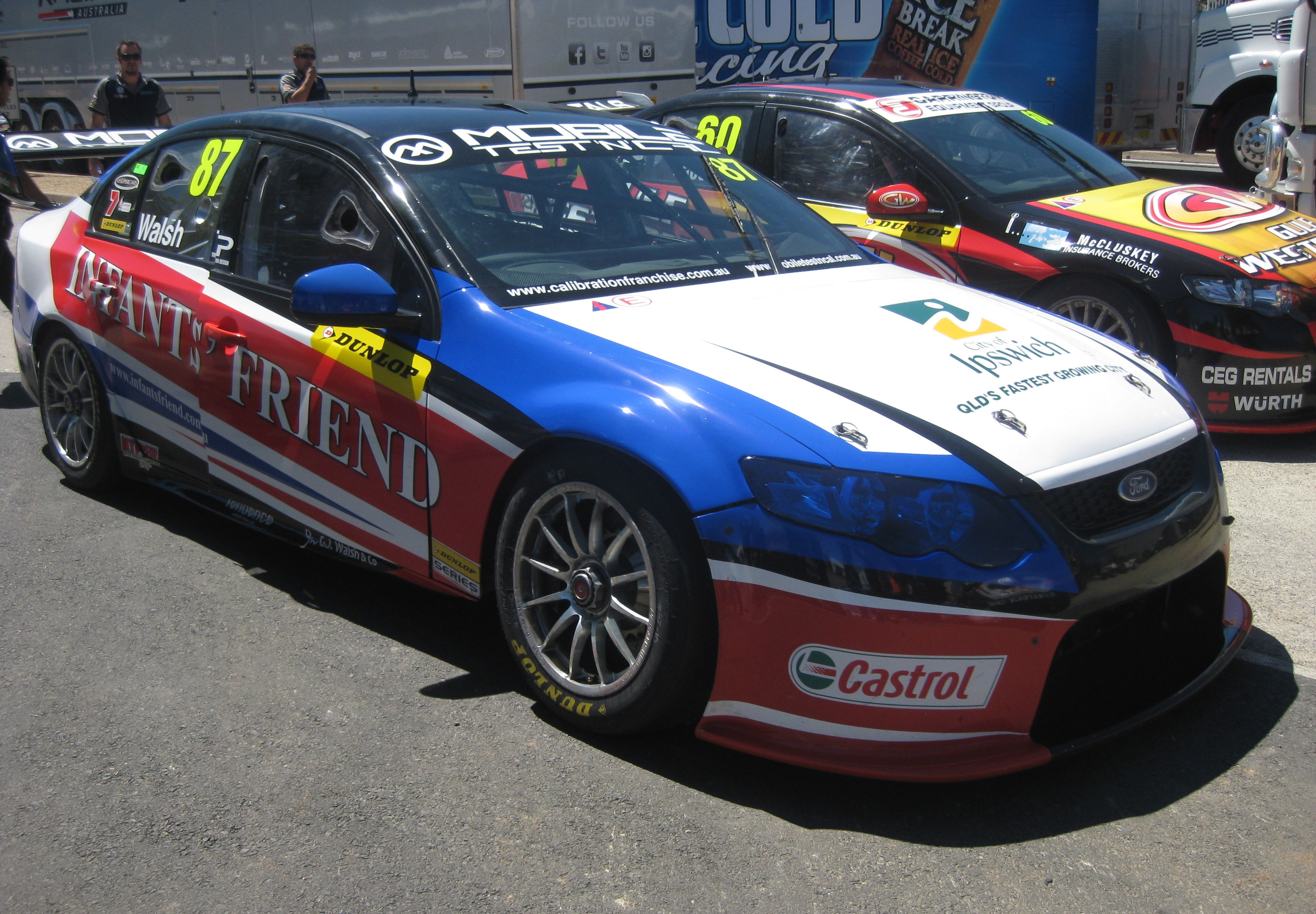
Ashley Walsh placed second driving a Ford FG Falcon for Matt Stone Racing

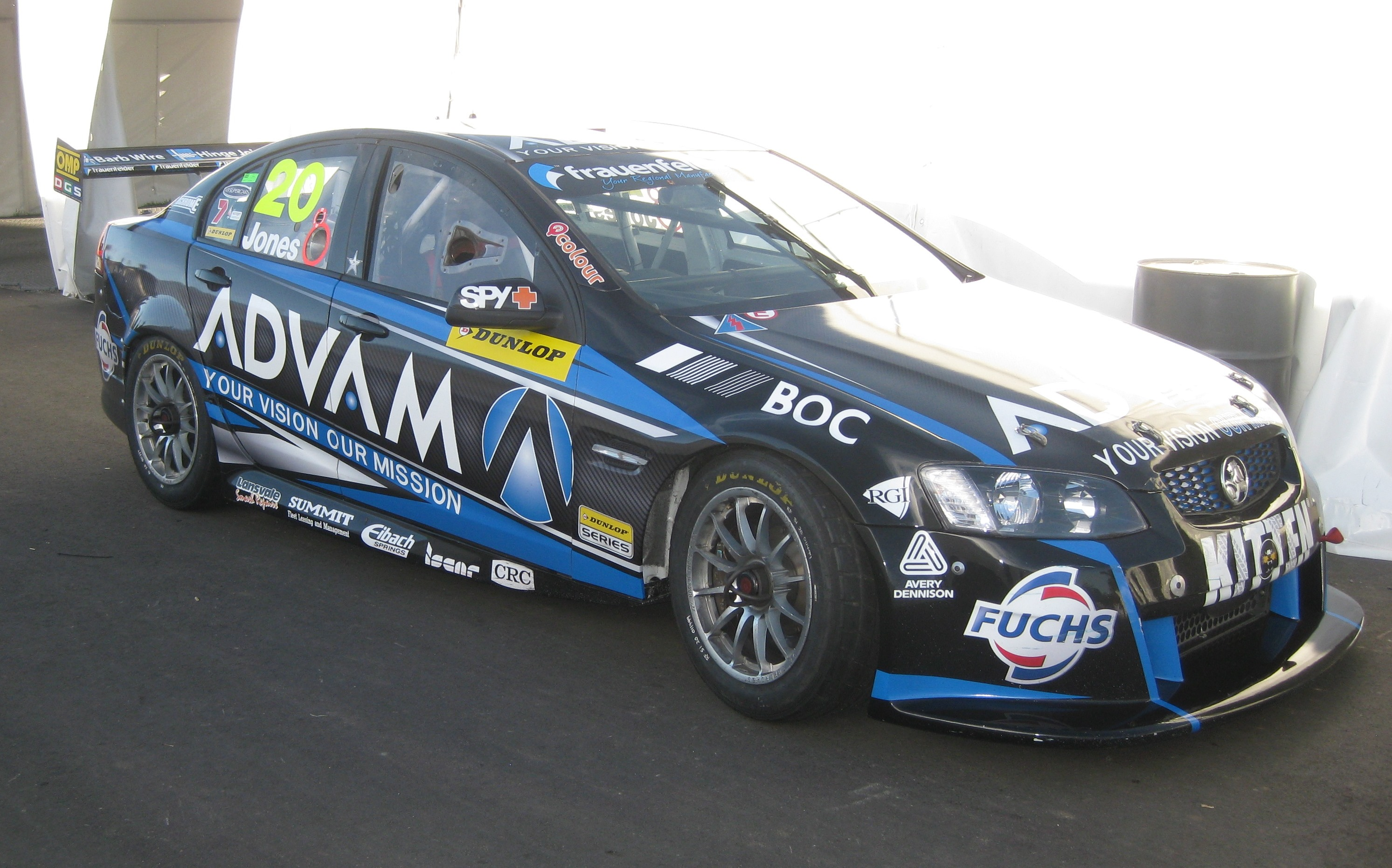
Andrew Jones placed third driving a Holden VE Commodore for Brad Jones Racing

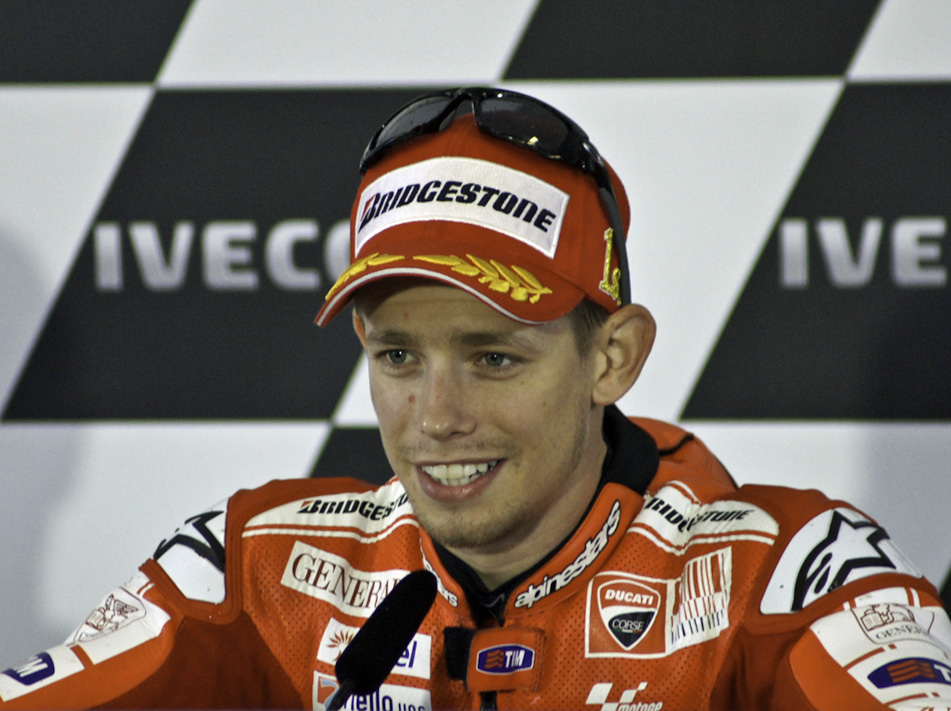
Two-time MotoGP World Champion Casey Stoner (seen here at the 2010 Australian motorcycle Grand Prix), placed 18th driving a Holden VE Commodore for Triple Eight Race Engineering

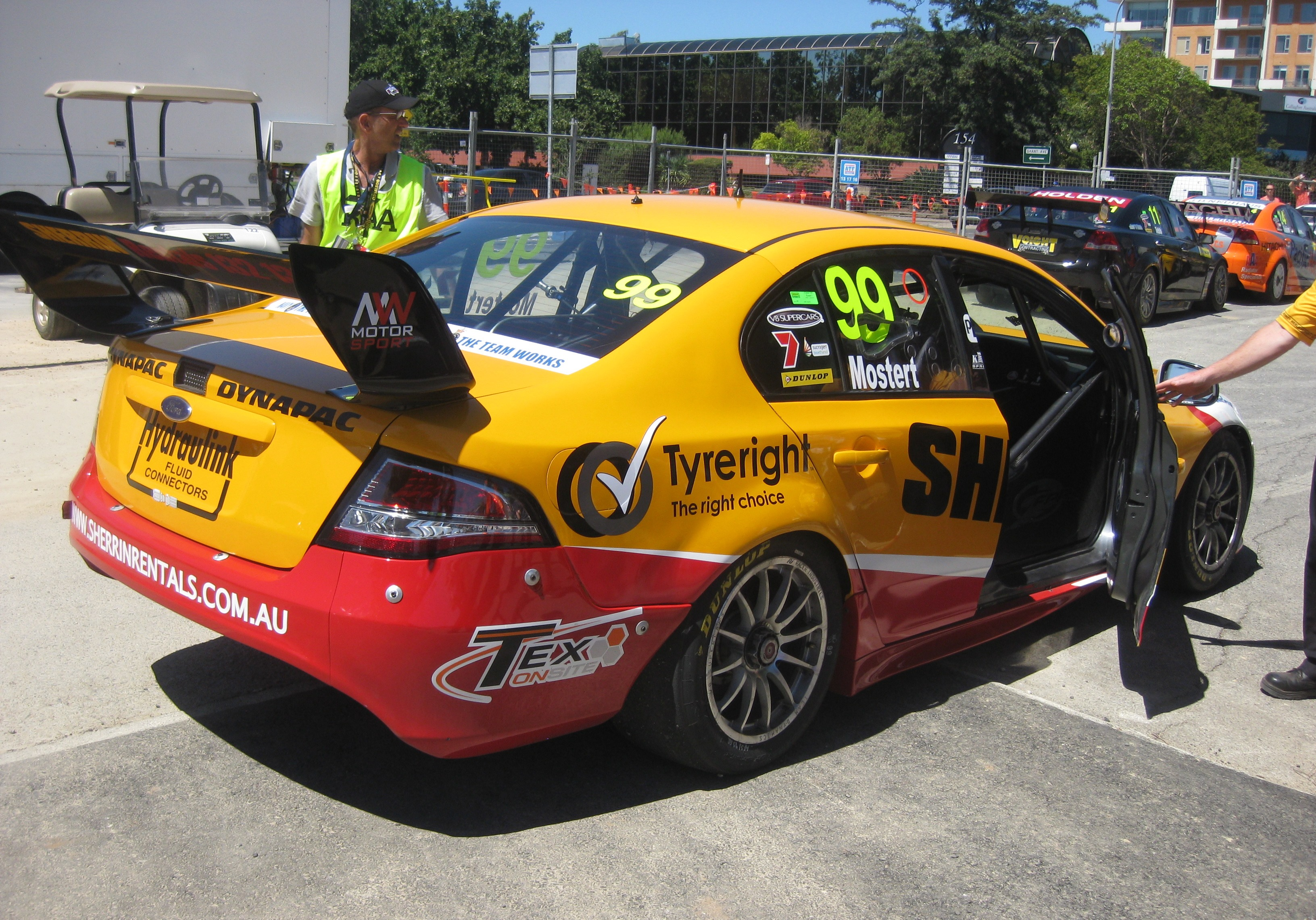
Chaz Mostert placed 29th driving a Ford FG Falcon for MW Motorsport. Mostert only contested the Adelaide round, which he won.

The following teams and drivers competed in the 2013 Dunlop Series:

Manufacturer	Model	Team	No.	Driver	Rounds
Ford	Falcon FG	Image Racing	10	(Australia) Taz Douglas	All
Ford	Falcon FG	MW Motorsport	26	(Australia) Dale Wood	All
Ford	Falcon FG	MW Motorsport	28	(Australia) Morgan Haber	All
Ford	Falcon FG	MW Motorsport	99	(Australia) Chaz Mostert	1
Ford	Falcon FG	MW Motorsport	99	(Australia) Steve Owen	2–7
Ford	Falcon FG	Tony D'Alberto Racing	30	(Australia) Nick McBride	All
Ford	Falcon FG	Evans Motorsport Group	31	(Australia) Kristian Lindbom	1–4, 6
Ford	Falcon FG	Evans Motorsport Group	31	(New Zealand) Daniel Gaunt	5
Ford	Falcon FG	Matt Stone Racing	35	(Australia) George Miedecke	All
Ford	Falcon FG	Matt Stone Racing	60	(Australia) Michael Hector	3–7
Ford	Falcon FG	Matt Stone Racing	87	(Australia) Ashley Walsh	All
Ford	Falcon FG	Finance EZI Racing	44	(Australia) Josh Hunter	1–6
Ford	Falcon FG	Finance EZI Racing	44	(Australia) Maurice Pickering	7
Ford	Falcon FG	Finance EZI Racing	64	(New Zealand) Andre Heimgartner	All
Ford	Falcon FG	Novocastrian Motorsport	58	(Australia) Drew Russell	All
Ford	Falcon FG	Novocastrian Motorsport	59	(Australia) Aaren Russell	All
Ford	Falcon FG	Novocastrian Motorsport	60	(Australia) Michael Hector	1–2
Ford	Falcon FG	Action Racing	71	(Australia) Marcus Zukanovic	7
Ford	Falcon FG	Sonic Motor Racing Services	777	(Australia) Rodney Jane	All
Ford	Falcon FG	Sonic Motor Racing Services	999	(Australia) Garry Jacobson	All
Holden	Commodore VE	RSport Engineering	11	(Australia) Aaron Tebb	1–3, 5, 7
Holden	Commodore VE	RSport Engineering	11	(Australia) Brett Hobson	6
Holden	Commodore VE	RSport Engineering	16	(Australia) Justin Garioch	3
Holden	Commodore VE	RSport Engineering	16	(Australia) Aaron Tebb	4, 6
Holden	Commodore VE	RSport Engineering	16	(Australia) Brett Hobson	5, 7
Holden	Commodore VE	Brad Jones Racing	20	(Australia) Andrew Jones	All
Holden	Commodore VE	Brad Jones Racing	41	(Australia) Luke Youlden	5
Holden	Commodore VE	Brad Jones Racing	42	(New Zealand) Chris Pither	All
Holden	Commodore VE	Nandi Kiss Racing	24	(Australia) Chris Alajajian	1
Holden	Commodore VE	Nandi Kiss Racing	24	(Australia) Nandi Kiss	2–7
Holden	Commodore VE	Triple Eight Race Engineering	27	(Australia) Casey Stoner	All
Holden	Commodore VE	Evans Motorsport Group	48	(Australia) Geoff Emery	All
Holden	Commodore VE	THR Developments	32	(Australia) Josh Kean	5–6
Holden	Commodore VE	Eggleston Motorsport	38	(New Zealand) Daniel Gaunt	1–4
Holden	Commodore VE	Eggleston Motorsport	38	(New Zealand) Ant Pedersen	5
Holden	Commodore VE	Eggleston Motorsport	54	(Australia) Jay Verdnik	1
Holden	Commodore VE	Eggleston Motorsport	54	(Australia) Jack Perkins	2–7
Holden	Commodore VE	Minda Motorsport	43	(Australia) Sam Walter	All
Holden	Commodore VE	Minda Motorsport	56	(Australia) Todd Hazelwood	7
Holden	Commodore VE	Minda Motorsport	98	(Australia) Cameron Waters	All
Holden	Commodore VE	Greg Murphy Racing	51	(Australia) Jim Pollicina	All
Holden	Commodore VE	Warrin Mining	62	(Australia) Adam Wallis	1, 4–6
Holden	Commodore VE	Paul Morris Motorsport	67	(Australia) Paul Morris	2–7
Holden	Commodore VE	Action Racing	71	(Australia) Marcus Zukanovic	1–6
Holden	Commodore VE	Formula Tech Performance	73	(Australia) Brett Stewart	All
Holden	Commodore VE	McGill Motorsport	75	(Australia) Aaron McGill	All

=== Team changes ===
- V8 Supercar teams Ford Performance Racing and Walkinshaw Racing will no longer support entries in the Dunlop Series.
- Formula Ford team Evans Motorsport Group purchased a Ford Performance Racing-built Ford FG Falcon that was run by Rod Nash Racing in the 2012 V8 Supercars Championship. The team later merged with Greg Murphy Racing to run two cars in the 2013 series. The combined team will be campaign with a Triple Eight-built Holden VE Commodore alongside their FPR-built Ford FG Falcon.
- Image Racing purchased the Stone Brothers Racing Ford FG Falcon driven by Shane van Gisbergen in the 2012 V8 Supercars Championship.
- MW Motorsport purchased the Ford FG Falcons used by Ford Performance Racing's Mark Winterbottom and Will Davison in the 2012 V8 Supercars Championship, expanding the team to three cars. Morgan Haber will be the driver of one of the entries.
- Family-owned team Novocastrian Motorsport have purchased two Stone Brothers Racing-built Ford FG Falcons.
- Queensland businessman Maurice Pickering will establish Finance EZI Racing, running two Ford FG Falcons.
- Tony D'Alberto Racing will expand its operations to include a Dunlop Series entry. Using the FG Falcon that D'Alberto used in the 2011 and 2012 V8 Supercar Championships.

=== Driver changes ===
- Chris Alajajian will return to the series with Nandi Kiss Racing after a two-year break from competition. Alajajian had previously contested the Development Series in 2007.
- Taz Douglas will return to the Dunlop Series after a year racing for Lucas Dumbrell Motorsport in the International V8 Supercars Championship.
- Andre Heimgartner will move from the Australian Carrera Cup Championship to the Dunlop Series, driving for Finance EZI Racing.
- Reigning third-tier V8 Supercar champion Josh Hunter will join the series, driving for Finance EZI Racing.
- Kristian Lindbom will move from Lucas Dumbrell Motorsport to the combined Evans-Murphy team.
- George Miedecke will move from Sonic Motor Racing Services to Matt Stone Racing.
- Nick McBride, who contested the 2011 British Formula Ford Championship and 2012 British Formula Three Championship will return to Australia to contest the Dunlop Series, driving for Tony D'Alberto Racing.
- Chaz Mostert will move from Ford Performance Racing's Dunlop Series team to MW Motorsport.
- Nick Percat will leave the Dunlop Series to compete in the Australian Carrera Cup Championship.
- Chris Pither will leave the V8 Ute Racing Series and return to the Dunlop Series with Brad Jones Racing. Pither previously competed in the series in 2006 and 2007.
- Jim Pollicina will run a Holden VE Commodore purchased from Greg Murphy Racing and last raced by Dale Wood in the 2012 series at Barbagallo Raceway.
- Two-time MotoGP World Champion Casey Stoner will contest the full series schedule, driving a Holden VE Commodore prepared by Triple Eight Race Engineering.
- Jay Verdnik will return to the category after a three-year hiatus, driving for Eggleston Motorsport.
- Cameron Waters will leave Dreamtime Racing, moving to Minda Motorsport, the team that prepared his entry for the 2011 and 2012 Bathurst 1000 races.
- Sam Walter will return to the Dunlop Series after a three-year absence, racing for Minda Motorsport.
- Dale Wood will move from Greg Murphy Racing to MW Motorsport.

== Calendar ==
The 2013 Dunlop Series comprised nineteen races within seven rounds at seven circuits, all in support of the International V8 Supercars Championship. The calendar remains unchanged from the 2012 season, with only the Winton event being brought forward, reflecting the change in the V8 Supercar Championship calendar.

Series schedule						Results summary	
Rnd	Rce	Event	Circuit	Location	Date	Winning driver	Round winner
1	1	(South Australia) Clipsal 500 Adelaide	Adelaide Street Circuit	Adelaide, South Australia	1 March	(Australia) Ashley Walsh	(Australia) Chaz Mostert
1	2	(South Australia) Clipsal 500 Adelaide	Adelaide Street Circuit	Adelaide, South Australia	2 March	(Australia) Chaz Mostert	(Australia) Chaz Mostert
2	3	(Western Australia) Chill Perth 360	Barbagallo Raceway	Perth, Western Australia	4 May	(Australia) Ashley Walsh	(Australia) Ashley Walsh
2	4	(Western Australia) Chill Perth 360	Barbagallo Raceway	Perth, Western Australia	5 May	(Australia) Jack Perkins	(Australia) Ashley Walsh
2	5	(Western Australia) Chill Perth 360	Barbagallo Raceway	Perth, Western Australia	5 May	(Australia) Dale Wood	(Australia) Ashley Walsh
3	6	(Queensland) Sucrogen Townsville 400	Townsville Street Circuit	Townsville, Queensland	6 July	(Australia) Steve Owen	(Australia) Steve Owen
3	7	(Queensland) Sucrogen Townsville 400	Townsville Street Circuit	Townsville, Queensland	7 July	(Australia) Paul Morris	(Australia) Steve Owen
3	8	(Queensland) Sucrogen Townsville 400	Townsville Street Circuit	Townsville, Queensland	7 July	(Australia) Steve Owen	(Australia) Steve Owen
4	9	(Queensland) Coates Hire Ipswich 360	Queensland Raceway	Ipswich, Queensland	27 July	(Australia) Dale Wood	(Australia) Jack Perkins
4	10	(Queensland) Coates Hire Ipswich 360	Queensland Raceway	Ipswich, Queensland	28 July	(New Zealand) Andre Heimgartner	(Australia) Jack Perkins
4	11	(Queensland) Coates Hire Ipswich 360	Queensland Raceway	Ipswich, Queensland	28 July	(Australia) Jack Perkins	(Australia) Jack Perkins
5	12	(Victoria (state)) Winton 360	Winton Motor Raceway	Benalla, Victoria	24 August	(Australia) Dale Wood	(Australia) Dale Wood
5	13	(Victoria (state)) Winton 360	Winton Motor Raceway	Benalla, Victoria	25 August	(Australia) Geoff Emery	(Australia) Dale Wood
5	14	(Victoria (state)) Winton 360	Winton Motor Raceway	Benalla, Victoria	25 August	(Australia) Jack Perkins	(Australia) Dale Wood
6	15	(New South Wales) Supercheap Auto Bathurst 1000	Mount Panorama Circuit	Bathurst, New South Wales	10 October	(Australia) Steve Owen	(Australia) Steve Owen
6	16	(New South Wales) Supercheap Auto Bathurst 1000	Mount Panorama Circuit	Bathurst, New South Wales	11 October	(Australia) Steve Owen	(Australia) Steve Owen
7	18	(New South Wales) Sydney NRMA Motoring & Services 500	Homebush Street Circuit	Sydney, New South Wales	7 December	(Australia) Ashley Walsh	(Australia) Steve Owen
7	19	(New South Wales) Sydney NRMA Motoring & Services 500	Homebush Street Circuit	Sydney, New South Wales	8 December	(Australia) Steve Owen	(Australia) Steve Owen

== Points system ==
Points were awarded to the driver of a car that had completed 75% of the race distance and was running at the completion of the final lap. Two different points scales were applied to rounds having two or three races to ensure that a driver would be awarded 300 points for winning all races at any event.

Points were awarded using the following system:

Position	1st	2nd	3rd	4th	5th	6th	7th	8th	9th	10th	11th	12th	13th	14th	15th	16th	17th	18th	19th	20th	21st	22nd	23rd	24th	25th	26th	27th	28th	29th	30th
Two-race format (All races)	150	138	129	120	111	102	96	90	84	78	72	69	66	63	60	57	54	51	48	45	42	39	36	33	30	27	24	21	18	15
Three-race format (Races 1 and 3)	120	110	103	96	89	82	77	72	67	62	57	55	53	51	48	46	43	41	38	36	33	30	28	26	24	21	18	16	13	11
Three-race format (Race 2)	60	56	52	48	44	40	38	36	34	32	30	28	26	24	23	22	21	20	19	18	17	16	15	14	13	12	11	10	9	8

== Series standings ==
Pos.	Driver	No.	ADE (South Australia)		BAR (Western Australia)			TOW (Queensland)			QLD (Queensland)			WIN (Victoria (state))			BAT (New South Wales)		SYD (New South Wales)		Pen.	Pts.
1	(Australia) Dale Wood	26	3	2	2	7	1	2	4	2	**1**	8	**7**	1	5	**2**	2	2	9	6		1772
2	(Australia) Ashley Walsh	87	1	**3**	1	5	**2**	10	**8**	4	4	4	28	4	4	4	8	4	1	Ret		1508
3	(Australia) Andrew Jones	20	4	25	8	3	15	6	3	3	7	28	4	3	6	3	5	7	5	4		1425
4	(Australia) Jack Perkins	54			9	1	7	18	10	7	2	7	1	**2**	8	1	3	3	3	3		1404
5	(Australia) Steve Owen	99			**Ret**	10	9	**1**	5	**1**	3	5	2	Ret	18	9	**1**	**1**	2	1		1315
6	(Australia) Taz Douglas	10	12	5	4	8	3	26	18	9	6	Ret	Ret	20	15	15	4	6	4	2	40	1152
7	(Australia) Drew Russell	58	6	12	13	9	12	7	Ret	Ret	9	2	12	7	2	7	7	5	11	10		1138
8	(Australia) George Miedecke	35	7	7	10	**2**	11	8	2	5	14	10	19	8	10	5	6	8	Ret	20		1135
9	(Australia) Aaren Russell	59	9	6	19	17	13	4	7	6	13	9	6	Ret	23	23	10	27	8	8		1008
10	(Australia) Cameron Waters	98	10	8	6	23	8	28	19	DSQ	26	14	11	5	7	11	14	21	7	7		956
11	(New Zealand) Daniel Gaunt	38/31	8	9	5	6	4	3	9	19	5	3	3	11	25	12						943
12	(Australia) Paul Morris	67			7	4	6	9	1	8	12	6	26	12	9	10	23	11	13	13		913
13	(Australia) Kristian Lindbom	31	5	4	3	22	5	5	6	DSQ	Ret	18	10				13	9				800
14	(Australia) Geoff Emery	48	11	10	18	16	10	11	12	DSQ	28	15	20	9	1	22	11	Ret	14	12		788
15	(New Zealand) Chris Pither	42	18	Ret	12	14	17	12	11	DSQ	11	17	9	26	19	14	21	10	6	5	40	787
16	(Australia) Nick McBride	30	20	Ret	15	13	14	16	16	14	8	Ret	27	6	11	8	18	15	10	11	40	785
17	(Australia) Garry Jacobson	999	17	13	11	11	16	27	20	10	19	26	15	18	12	26	15	13	Ret	18		717
18	(Australia) Casey Stoner	27	Ret	14	21	21	20	29	14	12	17	11	5	Ret	22	16	9	Ret	12	9		704
19	(Australia) Rodney Jane	777	13	16	17	15	19	14	15	Ret	20	Ret	13	13	13	18	16	14	19	Ret		678
20	(New Zealand) Andre Heimgartner	64	15	11	27	18	24	23	17	DSQ	10	**1**	22	Ret	21	17	17	12	24	16		677
21	(Australia) Marcus Zukanovic	71	19	17	16	25	22	15	22	11	15	13	Ret	14	30	Ret	20	19	Ret	Ret		536
22	(Australia) Sam Walter	43	22	18	22	20	21	Ret	DNS	DNS	16	12	8	24	20	20	27	18	15	14	60	535
23	(Australia) Josh Hunter	44	14	26	20	19	25	17	Ret	13	Ret	19	16	15	14	13	12	Ret				524
24	(Australia) Morgan Haber	28	Ret	19	14	12	18	13	13	15	Ret	16	14	Ret	24	19	19	Ret	21	17	25	514
25	(Australia) Brett Stewart	73	25	23	24	24	23	21	27	Ret	24	22	21	21	26	24	28	25	18	19		474
26	(Australia) Aaron McGill	75	24	Ret	Ret	DNS	28	20	24	17	23	20	18	28	29	28	Ret	23	17	21		403
27	(Australia) Jim Pollicina	51	26	Ret	25	26	26	19	23	Ret	21	21	25	19	32	27	22	26	23	22	25	384
28	(Australia) Michael Hector	60	27	24	23	29	29	22	25	16	18	25	24	27	31	Ret	Ret	22	22	Ret	40	333
29	(Australia) Chaz Mostert	99	**2**	1																		288
30	(Australia) Adam Wallis	62	21	21							25	24	17	25	28	25	24	24				288
31	(Australia) Aaron Tebb	11	Ret	22	Ret	27	27	Ret	DNS	DNS	22	23	Ret	22	34	DNS	29	20	20	Ret		252
32	(Australia) Nandi Kiss	24			26	28	Ret	25	26	Ret	27	27	23	Ret	33	29	25	28	Ret	24		223
33	(Australia) Brett Hobson	16												23	27	21	Ret	17	16	15	25	101
34	(Australia) Luke Youlden	41												10	**3**	6						196
35	(Australia) Josh Kean	32												17	16	Ret	26	16				149
36	(Australia) Jay Verdnik	54	16	15																		117
37	(Australia) Justin Garioch	16						24	21	18												84
38	(Australia) Chris Alajajian	24	23	20																		81
39	(New Zealand) Ant Pedersen	38												16	17	30						79
40	(Australia) Maurice Pickering	44																	25	23		66
	(Australia) Todd Hazelwood	56																	DNS	DNS		0
Pos.	Driver	No.	ADE (South Australia)		BAR (Western Australia)			TOW (Queensland)			QLD (Queensland)			WIN (Victoria (state))			BAT (New South Wales)		SYD (New South Wales)		Pen.	Pts.

Colour	Result
Gold	Winner
Silver	Second place
Bronze	Third place
Green	Points classification
Blue	Non-points classification
Blue	Non-classified finish (NC)
Purple	Retired, not classified (Ret)
Red	Did not qualify (DNQ)
Red	Did not pre-qualify (DNPQ)
Black	Disqualified (DSQ)
White	Did not start (DNS)
White	Withdrew (WD)
White	Race cancelled (C)
Blank	Did not practice (DNP)
Blank	Did not arrive (DNA)
Blank	Excluded (EX)

Bold - Pole position
Italics - Fastest lap

== See also ==
2013 V8 Supercar season
