= Kristian Lindbom =

Australian racing driver

- Nationality: Australian
- Born: Kristian Arthur Guy Lindbom; 18 September 1989 (age 37)

Dunlop V8 Supercar Series career
- Debut season: 2012
- Current team: Kali Motorsport
- Car number: 50
- Former teams: Lucas Dumbrell Motorsport; Evans Motorsport Group; Dragon Motor Racing
- Starts: 17
- Wins: 0
- Podiums: 1
- Poles: 0
- Fastest laps: 0
- Best finish: 13th in 2013

Previous series
- 2000-05 2006-08 2009-11: Karts; Australian Formula Ford; Australian Formula 3

Championship titles
- 2002 2003 2004 2004 2005: AKA Australian Junior National; CIK/FIA Australian Junior Intercontinental A AKA Australian Junior Clubman; CIK/FIA Australian Junior Intercontinental A AKA Australian Formula 100 Champion

Kristian Arthur Guy Lindbom (born 18 September 1989) is an Australian former racing car driver from Sydney, Australia. He now lives in Melbourne, Australia. Kristian is a driver coach for Fast Track Racing, Mercedes-Benz, Lexus, Aston Martin and Australian Formula Ford team Evans Motorsport Group.

== Karts ==
Lindbom won multiple titles in Australia in his youth. In 2002, he won the AKA Australian Junior National Championship on dirt. In 2003, he moved to circuit karts and won the CIK/FIA Australian Junior Intercontinental A Championship. In 2004, he won two titles in the AKA Australian Junior Clubman and CIK/FIA Australian Junior Intercontinental A classes. In 2005, he was the AKA Australian Formula 100 Champion.

== Formula Ford ==
Lindbom began competing in State level races, finishing second in the Victorian and fourth in the New South Wales Championships. He then competed in the Australian Formula Ford Championship from 2006 through to 2008 for Borland Racing Developments (2006–2007) and Sonic Motor Racing Services (2008). Over the three years, he won six races, 28 podiums, three pole positions and four fastest laps.

== Formula 3 ==
In the 2009 and 2010 seasons, Lindbom had showings in Formula 3 on three occasions with limited success due to a lack of testing laps prior to races.

In 2011, at the Hidden Valley Raceway round of V8 Supercars whilst working for Lucas Dumbrell Motorsport, a car capable of race wins became vacant. Fifteen minutes before the first qualifying session, Lindbom sat in the car for the first time and the first time in 14 months. He drove out of the garage in a formula car and finished the session in first place. He then went on to win the inaugural City of Darwin Cup.

== GP3 Series ==
On 2/3 December 2011, Lindbom tested competitively for the Tech 1 Racing in Jerez, Spain.

== Supercars ==
Lindbom tested with Lucas Dumbrell Motorsport in August 2011, and later in September, he tested for Walkinshaw Racing at Winton.

In February 2012, it was announced that Lindbom would compete in Adelaide in the Dunlop V8 Supercar Series for Lucas Dumbrell Motorsport, financed by Fast Track Communications. Lindbom raced competitively in his debut race and placed 10th.

In February 2013, it was announced that Lindbom would again compete in the Dunlop V8 Supercar Series, this year for Evans Motorsport Group racing EMG’s FPR-built FG Falcon.

Lindbom entered the Dunlop Series Queensland Raceway round in 2014 with Dragon Motor Racing with a view to participating in the main series Enduro Cup that season. Lindbom retired from the weekend and the wildcard bid was unsuccessful.

Lindbom made a surprise return to the grid in 2018, with a one-off drive for Kali Motorsport at the 2018 Super2 Series finale in Newcastle.

== Career summary ==
| Season | Series | Team | Races | Wins | Poles | F/laps | Podiums | Points | Position |
|---|---|---|---|---|---|---|---|---|---|
| 2006 | Australian Formula Ford Championship | Borland Racing Developments | 6 | 0 | 0 | 0 | 0 | 32 | 13th |
| 2006 | Victorian Formula Ford Championship | Borland Racing Developments | 18 | 3 | 1 | ? | 11 | 476 | 2nd |
| 2006 | New South Wales Formula Ford Championship | Borland Racing Developments | ? | ? | ? | ? | ? | 301 | 4th |
| 2007 | Australian Formula Ford Championship | Borland Racing Developments | 22 | 1 | 0 | 0 | 10 | 252 | 4th |
| 2008 | Australian Formula Ford Championship | Sonic Motor Racing Services | 20 | 1 | 0 | 0 | 7 | 297 | 3rd |
| 2009 | Australian Drivers Championship | Astuti Motorsport | 2 | 0 | 0 | 0 | 2 | 30 | 10th |
| 2010 | Australian Drivers Championship | Astuti Motorsport | 6 | 0 | 0 | 2 | 2 | 43 | 9th |
| 2011 | Australian Drivers Championship | Team BRM | 3 | 1 | 0 | 0 | 3 | 37 | 11th |
| 2012 | Dunlop V8 Supercar Series | Lucas Dumbrell Motorsport | 2 | 0 | 0 | 0 | 0 | 53 | 30th |
| 2013 | Dunlop V8 Supercar Series | Evans Motorsport Group | 13 | 0 | 0 | 0 | 1 | 800 | 13th |
| 2014 | Dunlop V8 Supercar Series | Dragon Motor Racing | 1 | 0 | 0 | 0 | 0 | 0 | N/C |
| 2018 | Dunlop Super2 Series | Kali Motorsport | 2 | 0 | 0 | 0 | 0 | 60 | 26th |

=== Complete Super2 Series results ===
(key) (Round results only)

Super2 Series results
| Year | Team | Car | 1 | 2 | 3 | 4 | 5 | 6 | 7 | Position | Points |
|---|---|---|---|---|---|---|---|---|---|---|---|
| 2012 | Lucas Dumbrell Motorsport | Holden VE Commodore | ADE; 21 | BAR | TOW | QLD | WIN | BAT | HOM | 30th | 53 |
| 2013 | Evans Motorsport Group | Ford FG Falcon | ADE; 4 | BAR; 5 | TOW; 10 | QLD; 20 | WIN | BAT; 9 | HOM | 13th | 800 |
| 2014 | Dragon Motor Racing | Holden VE Commodore | ADE | WIN | BAR | TOW | QLD; 29 | BAT | HOM | N/C | 0 |
| 2018 | Kali Motorsport | Holden VF Commodore | ADE | SYM | BAR | TOW | SAN | BAT | NEW; 15 | 26th | 60 |

== External References ==
- Official Website
- Kristian Lindbom career summary at DriverDB.com
