= Josh Kean =

Australian motor-racing driver (born 1993)

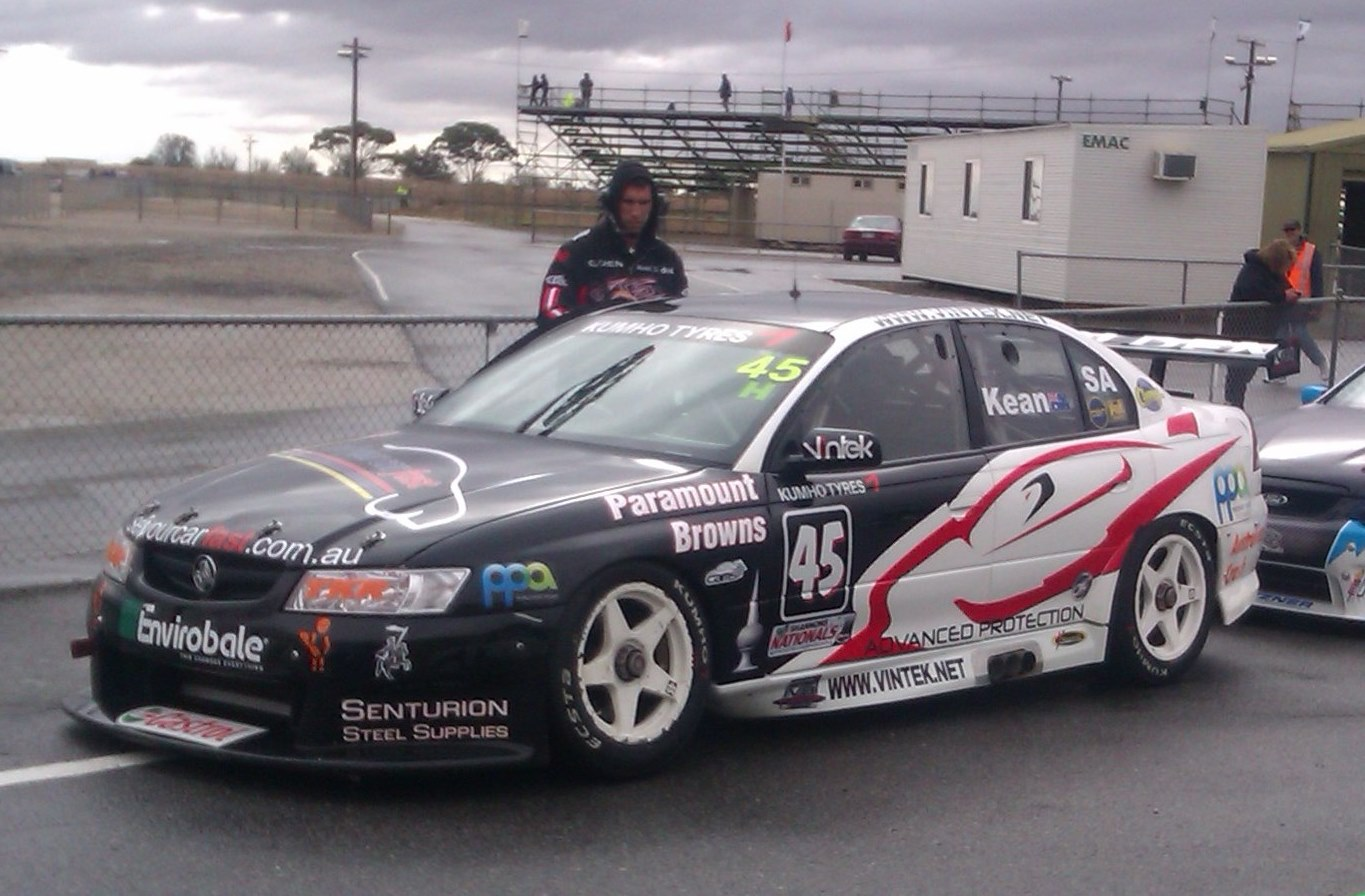
- Nationality: Australian
- Born: 3 July 1993 (age 33) Adelaide, South Australia

Dunlop Super2 Series career
- Debut season: 2013
- Former teams: THR Developments; Team Kean Racing; Brad Jones Racing; Prodrive Racing Australia
- Starts: 70
- Wins: 0
- Podiums: 0
- Poles: 0
- Best finish: 12th in 2016

Previous series
- 2013-17 2012: Dunlop Super2 Series; Australian Saloon Car Series

Joshua Vincent Kean (born 3 July 1993 in Adelaide, Australia) is an Australian motor-racing driver who has competed in the Dunlop Super2 Series.

Kean started in Karts as a child and progressed to the Saloon Car Championship where he was runner up in 2012.

Kean previously drove for his own team in 2013 and 2014 before moving to Brad Jones Racing for the 2015 and 2016 seasons. He then moved to Prodrive Racing Australia in 2017 season.

Since his move out of Supercars, Kean has been racing and doing exhibition runs in old Formula 1 cars.

== Career results ==
Season	Series	Position	Car	Team
2012	Australian Saloon Car Series	2nd	Holden VT Commodore	Josh Kean Racing
2013	Kumho Tyres V8 Touring Car Series	22nd	Holden VZ Commodore	THR Developments
2013	Dunlop V8 Supercar Series	35th	Holden VE Commodore	THR Developments
2014	Dunlop V8 Supercar Series	23rd	Holden VE Commodore	Team Kean Racing
2015	Dunlop V8 Supercar Series	19th	Holden VE Commodore	Brad Jones Racing
2016	Dunlop V8 Supercar Series	12th	Holden VF Commodore	Brad Jones Racing
2017	Dunlop Super2 Series	19th	Ford FG X Falcon	Prodrive Racing Australia

=== V8 Supercars Development Series results ===
(key) (Race results only)

V8 Supercars Development Series results
Year	Team	Car	1	2	3	4	5	6	7	8	9	10	11	12	13	14	15	16	17	18	19	20	21	Position	Points
2013	THR Developments	Holden Commodore VE	ADE; 1	ADE; 2	PER; 1	PER; 2	PER; 3	TSV; 1	TSV; 2	TSV; 3	IPS; 1	IPS; 2	IPS; 3	WIN; 1; 17	WIN; 2; 16	WIN; 3 Ret	BAT; 1; 26	BAT; 2; 16	SOP; 1	SOP; 2				35th	149
2014	Team Kean Racing	Holden Commodore VE	ADE; 1 Ret	ADE; 2 Ret	WIN; 1; 16	WIN; 2 Ret	PER; 1; 17	PER; 2; 20	TSV; 1; 20	TSV; 2 Ret	IPS; 1; 13	IPS; 2 Ret	BAT; 12	SOP; 1 Ret	SOP; 2; 15									23rd	440
2015	Brad Jones Racing	Holden Commodore VE	ADE; 1 Ret	ADE; 2; 16	PER; 1; 16	PER; 2; 15	PER; 3; 13	WIN; 1; 9	WIN; 2; 11	WIN; 3; 25	TSV; 1; 15	TSV; 2; 17	IPS; 1; 14	IPS; 2; 17	IPS; 3; 18	BAT; Ret	SOP; 1; 11	SOP; 2 Ret						19th	576
2016	Brad Jones Racing	Holden Commodore VF	ADE; R1; Ret	ADE; R2; Ret	PHI; R3; 8	PHI; R4; 6	PHI; R5; 4	BAR; R6; 9	BAR; R7; 8	BAR; R8; 11	TOW; R9; 8	TOW; R10; 8	SAN; R11; 12	SAN; R12; 15	SAN; R13; 13	BAT; R14; 15	SYD; R15; 12	SYD; R16; 10						12th	924
2017	Prodrive Racing Australia	Ford Falcon FG X	ADE; R1; 20	ADE; R2; 18	ADE; R3; Ret	SYM; R4; 8	SYM; R5; Ret	SYM; R6; 12	SYM; R7; 19	PHI; R8; 10	PHI; R9; 21	PHI; R10; 15	PHI; R11; 10	TOW; R12; Ret	TOW; R13; Ret	SMP; R14; 14	SMP; R15; 19	SMP; R16; Ret	SMP; R17; 9	SAN; R18; 15	SAN; R19; 6	NEW; R20; 14	NEW; R21; Ret	19th	623
