= 2010 Australian Drivers' Championship =

Motor racing competition

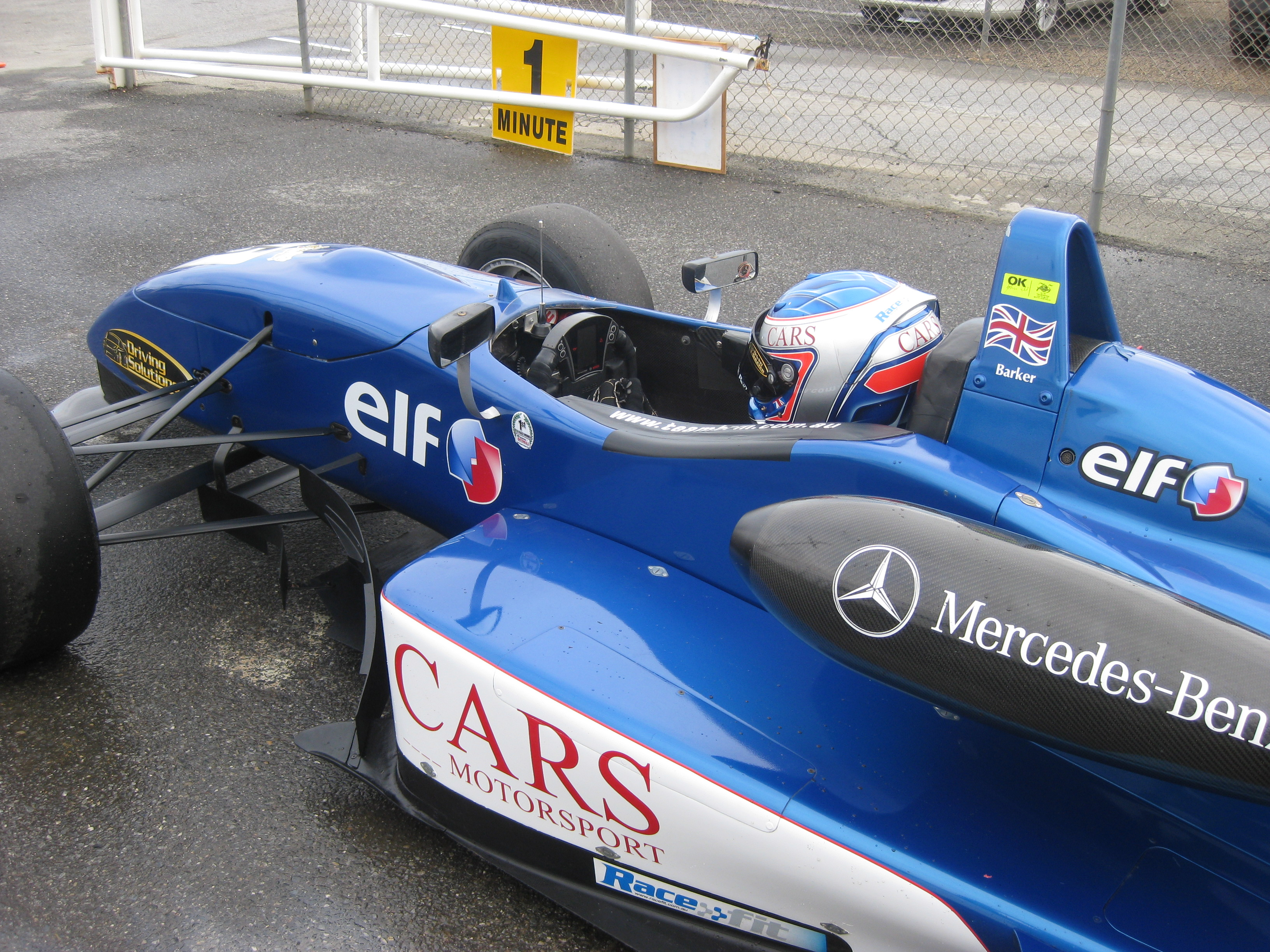
The Dallara F307 of Ben Barker at Mallala Motor Sport Park for Round 4 of the championship. Barker clinched the championship by a single point from team-mate Mitch Evans at the final round.

The 2010 Australian Drivers' Championship was a CAMS sanctioned national motor racing title with the championship winner receiving the 2010 CAMS Gold Star award. The 2010 championship was the 54th Australian Drivers' Championship and the sixth to be contested with open wheel racing cars constructed in accordance with FIA Formula 3 regulations. The season began on 7 March 2010 at the Wakefield Park and finished on 24 October at Sandown Raceway after seven rounds across four different states with three races at each round.

Heading into the final round of the series, British Team BRM driver Ben Barker led the championship over New Zealand teammate Mitch Evans. Barker pulled ahead after taking five of the six wins available at Mallala and Morgan Park and following it up with another win at the Eastern Creek round. Evans was eight points behind Barker, despite missing the Symmons Plains round due to a Formula Abarth test at Misano. Australian driver Tom Tweedie remained in the championship hunt, despite competing in the older 2004 specification Dallara-Renault compared to the 2007 model Team BRM Dallara-Mercedes cars of Barker and Evans.

A pair of fourth places for Barker at Sandown saw the two Team BRM drivers tied on points, however the bonus point scored by Barker for the fastest lap in the final race giving him a one-point championship margin over Evans. Barker was also helped by the annulment of the second race after a serious incident involving Graeme Holmes and John Boothman. Tweedie finished third in the championship standings, 12 points behind Barker. Two other drivers claimed race wins; Andrew Waite who substituted for Evans at Symmons Plains and Tim Macrow who won both Sandown races in his only appearance of the season.

Barker also won the East Coast Challenge, which was contested over the final three rounds of the series. He scored 101 points ahead of Evans (94), Tweedie (80), Chris Gilmour (66), Zhang Shan Qi (38) and Tim Macrow (33).

Tom Tweedie won the National Class title having outscored his rivals at each of the seven rounds.

== Classes ==
Each vehicle competing in the Championship was nominated into one of the following classes:

- Australian Formula 3 Championship – for automobiles constructed in accordance with the FIA Formula 3 regulations that applied between 1 January 2005 and 31 December 2007
- National Class – for automobiles constructed in accordance with the FIA Formula 3 regulations that applied between 1 January 1999 and 31 December 2004

There was an additional 'Invitation Class' in the regulations – for automobiles constructed in accordance with the appropriate regulations that applied in the year of manufacture, however no such vehicle took part during 2010 leaving the class redundant.

== Points System ==
Points system was revised for 2010 although the changes are minor.

Position	1st	2nd	3rd	4th	5th	6th	7th	8th	9th	10th	Pole; Position	Fastest; Lap
Races 1 & 2	12	9	8	7	6	5	4	3	2	1	1 (R1 only)	1
Race 3	20	15	12	10	8	6	4	3	2	1	0	1

Drivers of cars from all three classes were eligible to score points towards the Australian Drivers' Championship. National Class and Invitation Class drivers were also eligible to score points towards their respective class awards.

== Teams and drivers ==
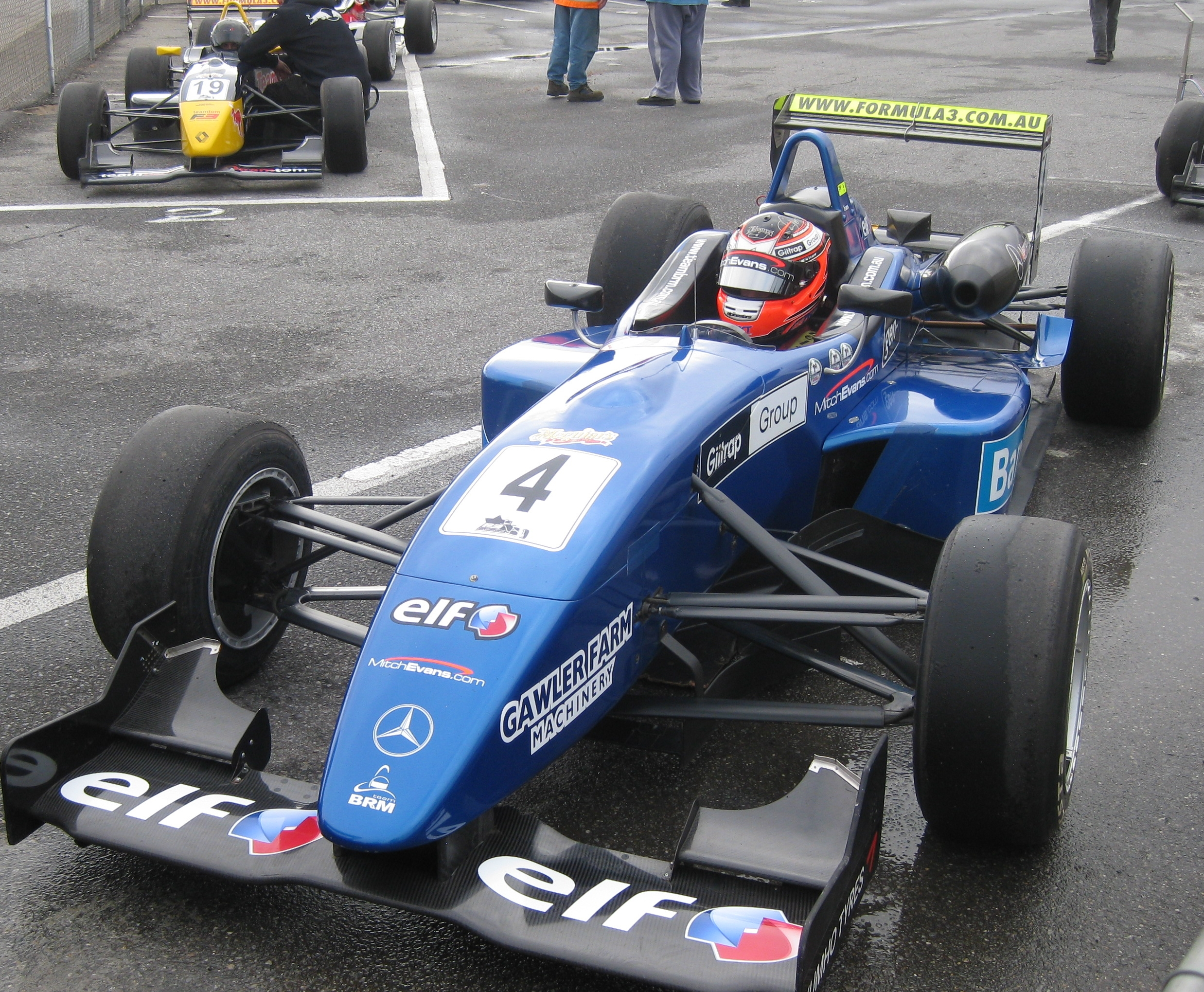
The Dallara F307 Mercedes-Benz of Mitch Evans at Mallala Motor Sport Park for Round 4 of the 2010 Australian Drivers Championship

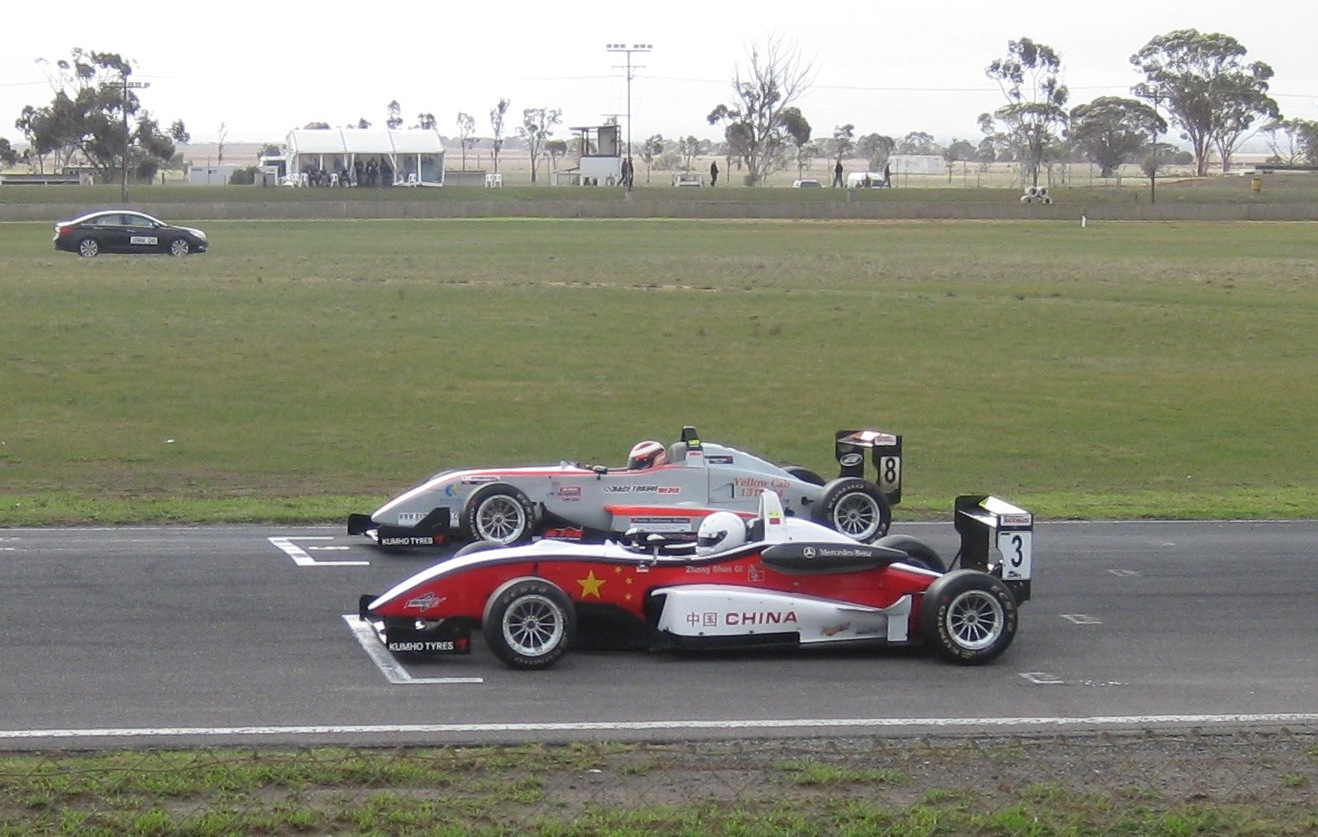
The No 3 Dallara F307 of Zhang Shan Qi and the No 8 Dallara F304 of Josh Burdon at the Mallala Motor Sport Park round of the 2010 Australian Drivers' Championship

The following teams and drivers competed in the 2010 Australian Drivers' Championship. Entries sourced in part from:

Team	Class	Chassis	Engine	No	Driver
Astuti Motorsport	Gold Star	Dallara F307	Mugen-Honda	2	(Australia) Mat Sofi
Astuti Motorsport	Gold Star	Dallara F307	Sodemo-Renault	11	(Australia) Kristian Lindbom (Australia) Nick Foster
Team BRM	Gold Star	Dallara F307	HWA-Mercedes-Benz	3	(China) Zhang Shan Qi
Team BRM	Gold Star	Dallara F307	HWA-Mercedes-Benz	4	(New Zealand) Mitch Evans (New Zealand) Andrew Waite
Team BRM	Gold Star	Dallara F307	HWA-Mercedes-Benz	5	(United Kingdom) Ben Barker
R-Tek Motorsport	National	Dallara F304	Spiess-Opel	7	(Australia) John Magro (Australia) Tom Drewer (New Zealand) Martin Short (Australia) Bryce Moore
R-Tek Motorsport	National	Dallara F304	Spiess-Opel	8	(Australia) Josh Burdon (Australia) Joshua Hunt (Australia) Nathan Morcom
R-Tek Motorsport	National	Dallara F301	Spiess-Opel	35	(Australia) Jesse Wakeman
JLB Global Timbers	National	Dallara F301	Novamotor-Fiat	12	(Australia) John Boothman
Cosmetic Medicine Centre	National	Dallara F304	Spiess-Opel	14	(Australia) Roman Krumins
Gilmour Racing	Gold Star	Dallara F307	HWA-Mercedes-Benz	17	(Australia) Chris Gilmour
Team Tom	National	Dallara F304	Sodemo-Renault	19	(Australia) Tom Tweedie
GKH Powdercoating	National	Dallara F304	Spiess-Opel	21	(Australia) Graeme Holmes
PHR Scuderia	National	Dallara F304	Sodemo-Renault	25	(Australia) Tim Macrow
Vic's Timber	National	Dallara F304	Spiess-Opel	42	(Australia) Ben Gersekowski
National Surgical	National	Dallara F301	Spiess-Opel	51	(Australia) James Mann
TanderSport	Gold Star	Dallara F307	HWA-Mercedes-Benz	52	(New Zealand) Ben Crighton

== Race calendar ==
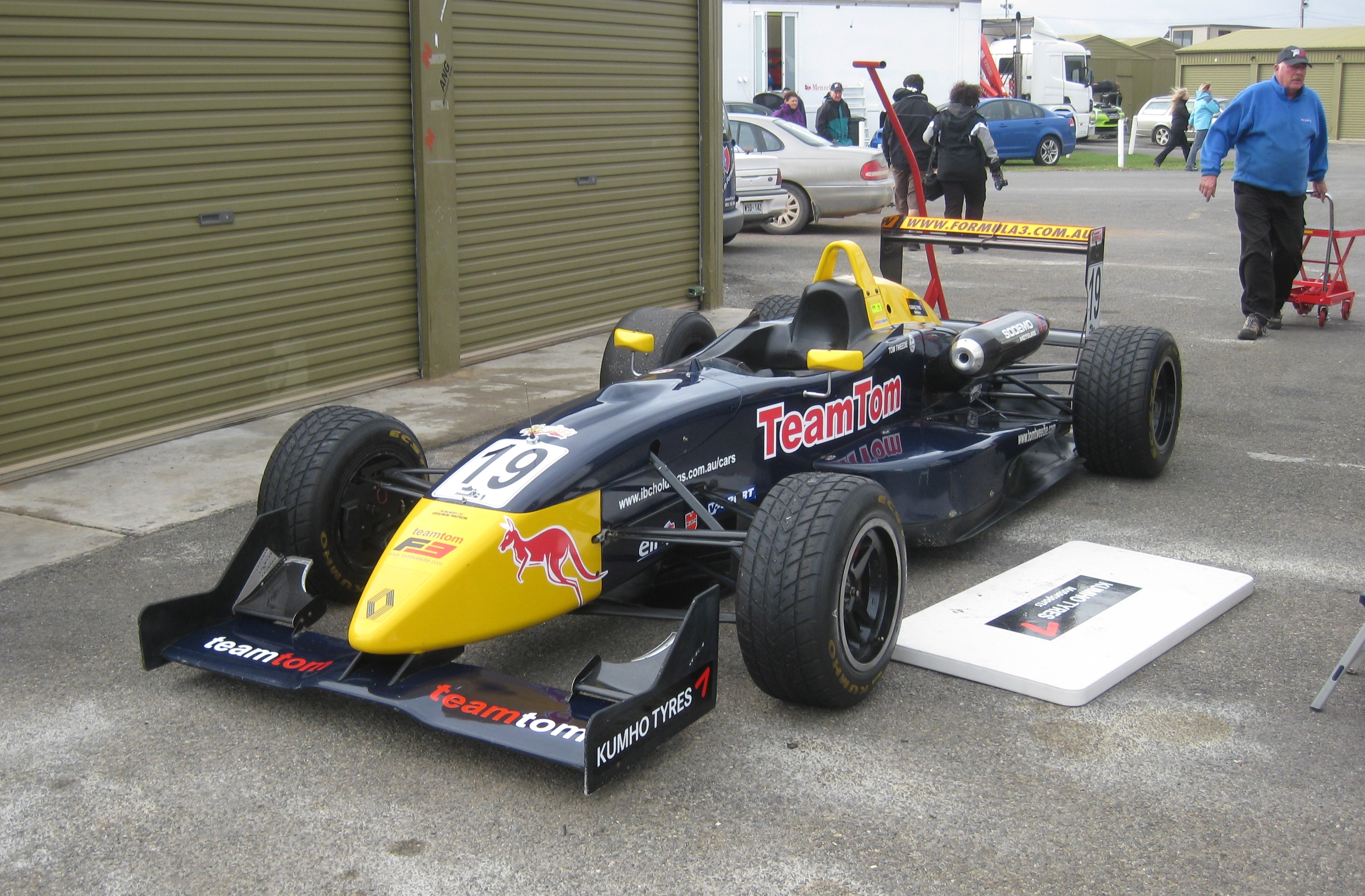
The Dallara F304 of Tom Tweedie at Mallala Motor Sport Park for the 4th round of the championship.

The championship was contested over a seven-round series with a round scheduled for Winton Motor Raceway being cancelled as a cost saving initiative.

The final three rounds of the series at Morgan Park, Eastern Creek and Sandown were packaged into a 'series within a series', labelled the East Coast Shootout.

Round	Race	Circuit	Date	Pole position	Fastest lap	Winning driver	Winning team
1	1	(New South Wales) Wakefield Park	6 March	Mitch Evans	Ben Crighton	Mitch Evans	Team BRM
1	2	(New South Wales) Wakefield Park	7 March	Mitch Evans	Ben Crighton	Mitch Evans	Team BRM
1	3	(New South Wales) Wakefield Park	7 March	Mitch Evans	Mitch Evans	Mitch Evans	Team BRM
2	4	(Tasmania) Symmons Plains Raceway	10 April	Ben Barker	Kristian Lindbom	Tom Tweedie	Team Tom
2	5	(Tasmania) Symmons Plains Raceway	11 April	Ben Barker	Kristian Lindbom	Andrew Waite	Team BRM
2	6	(Tasmania) Symmons Plains Raceway	11 April	Ben Barker	Tom Tweedie	Tom Tweedie	Team Tom
3	7	(Victoria (state)) Phillip Island	1 May	Mitch Evans	Ben Barker	Mitch Evans	Team BRM
3	8	(Victoria (state)) Phillip Island	2 May	Mitch Evans	Ben Barker	Mitch Evans	Team BRM
3	9	(Victoria (state)) Phillip Island	2 May	Mitch Evans	Mitch Evans	Mitch Evans	Team BRM
4	10	(South Australia) Mallala Motor Sport Park	29 May	Mitch Evans	Ben Barker	Ben Barker	Team BRM
4	11	(South Australia) Mallala Motor Sport Park	30 May	Mitch Evans	Ben Barker	Ben Barker	Team BRM
4	12	(South Australia) Mallala Motor Sport Park	30 May	Mitch Evans	Ben Barker	Ben Barker	Team BRM
5	13	(Queensland) Morgan Park Raceway	14 August	Mitch Evans	Ben Barker	Ben Barker	Team BRM
5	14	(Queensland) Morgan Park Raceway	15 August	Mitch Evans	Mitch Evans	Tom Tweedie	Team Tom
5	15	(Queensland) Morgan Park Raceway	15 August	Mitch Evans	Mitch Evans	Ben Barker	Team BRM
6	16	(New South Wales) Eastern Creek Raceway	11 September	Mitch Evans	Ben Barker	Mitch Evans	Team BRM
6	17	(New South Wales) Eastern Creek Raceway	12 September	Mitch Evans	Ben Barker	Mitch Evans	Team BRM
6	18	(New South Wales) Eastern Creek Raceway	12 September	Mitch Evans	Ben Barker	Ben Barker	Team BRM
7	19	(Victoria (state)) Sandown Raceway	23 October	Tim Macrow	Mitch Evans	Tim Macrow	PHR Scuderia
7	20	(Victoria (state)) Sandown Raceway	24 October	Tim Macrow	Red flag: Race cancelled		
7	21	(Victoria (state)) Sandown Raceway	24 October	Tim Macrow	Ben Barker	Tim Macrow	PHR Scuderia

=== Drivers Championship ===
Pos	Driver	WAK 1	WAK 2	WAK 3	SYM 1	SYM 2	SYM 3	PHI 1	PHI 2	PHI 3	MAL 1	MAL 2	MAL 3	MOR 1	MOR 2	MOR 3	EAS 1	EAS 2	EAS 3	SAN 1	SAN 2	SAN 3	Pts
GOLD STAR
1	(United Kingdom) Ben Barker	4	4	4	4	5	2	3	2	Ret	1	1	1	1	2	1	2	2	1	4		4	220
2	(New Zealand) Mitch Evans	1	1	1				1	1	1	3	2	2	5	3	2	1	1	3	2		2	219
3	(Australia) Tom Tweedie	3	3	3	1	2	1	2	5	2	2	4	3	2	1	4	3	3	2	5		3	208
4	(China) Zhang Shan Qi	6	6	6	Ret	7	7	8	7	6	4	6	4	4	5	5	6	5	Ret	7		9	97
5	(Australia) Chris Gilmour							4	4	4				3	4	3	5	4	4	3		5	90
6	(New Zealand) Ben Crighton	2	2	2				6	3	3													60
7	(Australia) John Magro	5	5	5	5	4	4										10	9	7				50
8	(Australia) Josh Burdon				6	6	5				6	5	6							6		6	46
9	(Australia) Kristian Lindbom				3	3	6	5	6	5													43
10	(Australia) Tim Macrow																			1		1	33
10	(New Zealand) Andrew Waite				2	1	3																33
12	(New Zealand) Martin Short										5	3	5										22
13	(Australia) Ben Gersekowski													Ret	DNS	7	7	8	8	8		7	21
14	(Australia) Roman Krumins							10	9	8				7	7	9	11	11	10	10		10	19
15	(Australia) Mat Sofi																4	7	6				17
16	(Australia) Joshua Hunt													6	6	6							16
16	(Australia) Nathan Morcom																8	6	5				16
18	(Australia) Tom Drewer							7	8	7													11
19	(Australia) Jesse Wakeman				7	8	8																10
20	(Australia) James Mann													8	8	8							9
21	(Australia) Graeme Holmes							9	DNS	Ret							Ret	12	9	9		DNS	6
22	(Australia) Bryce Moore																			Ret		8	3
22	(Australia) Nick Foster																9	10	Ret				3
-	(Australia) John Boothman																			11		Ret	0
National Class
1	(Australia) Tom Tweedie	3	3	3	1	2	1	2	5	2	2	4	3	2	1	4	3	3	2	5		3	310
2	(Australia) John Magro	5	5	5	5	4	4										10	9	7				92
3	(Australia) Roman Krumins							10	9	8				7	7	9	11	11	10	10		10	80
4	(Australia) Josh Burdon				6	6	5				6	5	6							6		6	76
5	(Australia) Ben Gersekowski													Ret	DNS	7	7	8	8	8		7	56
6	(New Zealand) Martin Short										5	3	5										36
7	(Australia) Tim Macrow																			1		1	34
8	(Australia) Joshua Hunt													6	6	6							33
8	(Australia) Tom Drewer							7	8	7													33
10	(Australia) Nathan Morcom																8	6	5				39
11	(Australia) Graeme Holmes							9	DNS	Ret							Ret	12	9	9		DNS	27
12	(Australia) Jesse Wakeman				7	8	8																24
12	(Australia) James Mann													8	8	8							24
14	(Australia) Bryce Moore																			Ret		8	8
15	(Australia) John Boothman																			11		Ret	4
East Coast Shootout
1	(United Kingdom) Ben Barker													1	2	1	2	2	1	4		4	101
2	(New Zealand) Mitch Evans													5	3	2	1	1	3	2		2	94
3	(Australia) Tom Tweedie													2	1	4	3	3	2	5		3	80
4	(Australia) Chris Gilmour													3	4	3	5	4	4	3		5	66
5	(China) Zhang Shan Qi													4	5	5	6	5	Ret	7		9	33
6	(Australia) Tim Macrow																			1		1	33
7	(Australia) Ben Gersekowski													Ret	DNS	7	7	8	8	8		7	21
8	(Australia) Mat Sofi																4	7	6				17
9	(Australia) Nathan Morcom																8	6	5				16
9	(Australia) Joshua Hunt													6	6	6							16
11	(Australia) Roman Krumins																11	11	10	10		10	13
12	(Australia) Josh Burdon																			6		6	11
13	(Australia) James Mann													8	8	8							9
14	(Australia) John Magro																10	9	7				7
15	(Australia) Graeme Holmes																Ret	12	9	9		DNS	4
16	(Australia) Bryce Moore																			Ret		8	3
16	(Australia) Nick Foster																9	10	Ret				3

Colour	Result
Gold	Winner
Silver	Second place
Bronze	Third place
Green	Points classification
Blue	Non-points classification
Blue	Non-classified finish (NC)
Purple	Retired, not classified (Ret)
Red	Did not qualify (DNQ)
Red	Did not pre-qualify (DNPQ)
Black	Disqualified (DSQ)
White	Did not start (DNS)
White	Withdrew (WD)
White	Race cancelled (C)
Blank	Did not practice (DNP)
Blank	Did not arrive (DNA)
Blank	Excluded (EX)

== See also ==
- Australian Drivers' Championship
- Australian Formula 3
