= 2014 Dunlop V8 Supercar Series =

Motor racing competition

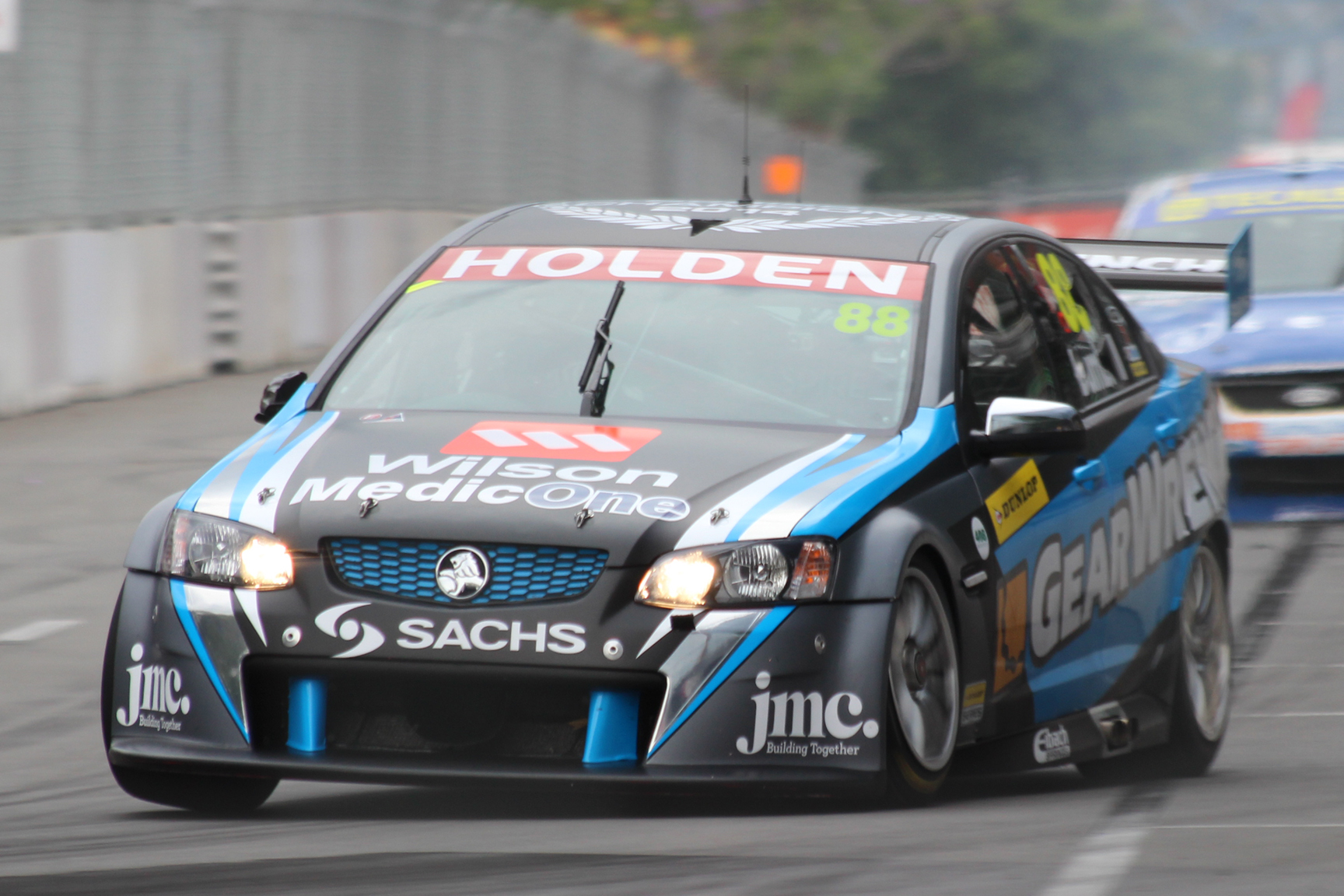
Paul Dumbrell won the series driving a Holden VE Commodore

The 2014 Dunlop Series was an Australian motor racing competition for V8 Supercars. It was the fifteenth running of the V8 Supercar Development Series, a support series to the International V8 Supercars Championship. The 2014 season featured a new format for the Dunlop Series weekends. Each round of the series – with the exception of Bathurst – featured two forty-minute races, rather than a range of two-race and three-race weekends. The Bathurst round was a single-race event, held over an endurance distance of 250 kilometres (160 miles), and allowing for optional driver changes.

2002 series winner Paul Dumbrell became the third driver to clinch a second title, after winning six races (and three rounds) during the season; this included four consecutive wins at Queensland Raceway, the Bathurst endurance race and the first race at Sydney Olympic Park. Despite missing the second Barbagallo race due to business commitments, Eggleston Motorsport's Dumbrell won the series by 247 points ahead of Ford Performance Racing driver Cam Waters. Waters won two races at Winton and the second Sydney Olympic Park race, where he also took the round win to move ahead of Ashley Walsh, who had held the runner-up spot for Matt Stone Racing prior to the event. Walsh won three races and two rounds in the early part of the series, but faded towards the end of the season. The series top five was rounded out by New Zealand's Chris Pither (Brad Jones Racing) and Andre Heimgartner (MW Motorsport), who won races at Townsville and Barbagallo respectively. Pither also won the round at Townsville, his first in the series.

== Teams and drivers ==
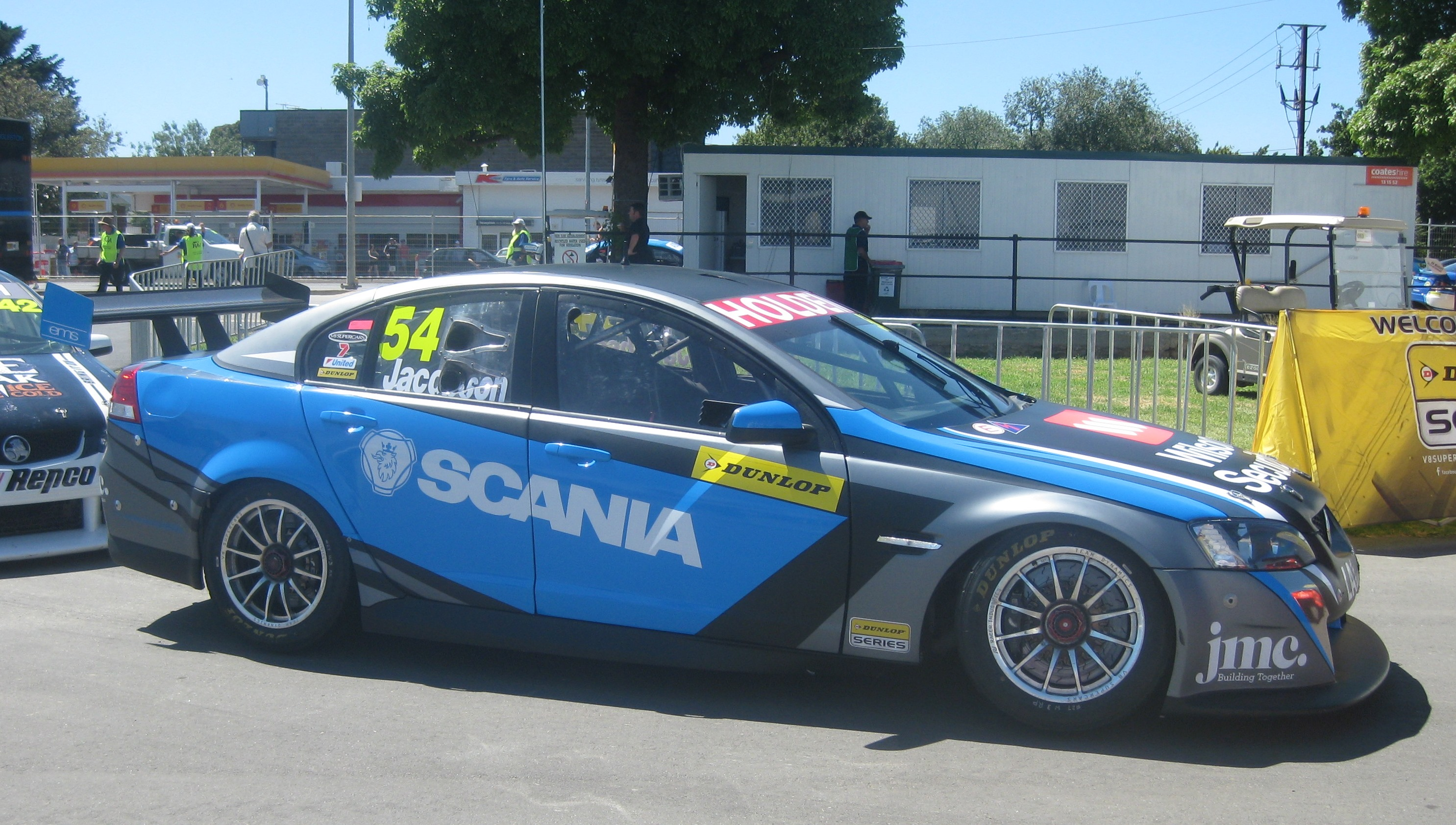
Garry Jacobson (Holden VE Commodore) placed 11th in the series

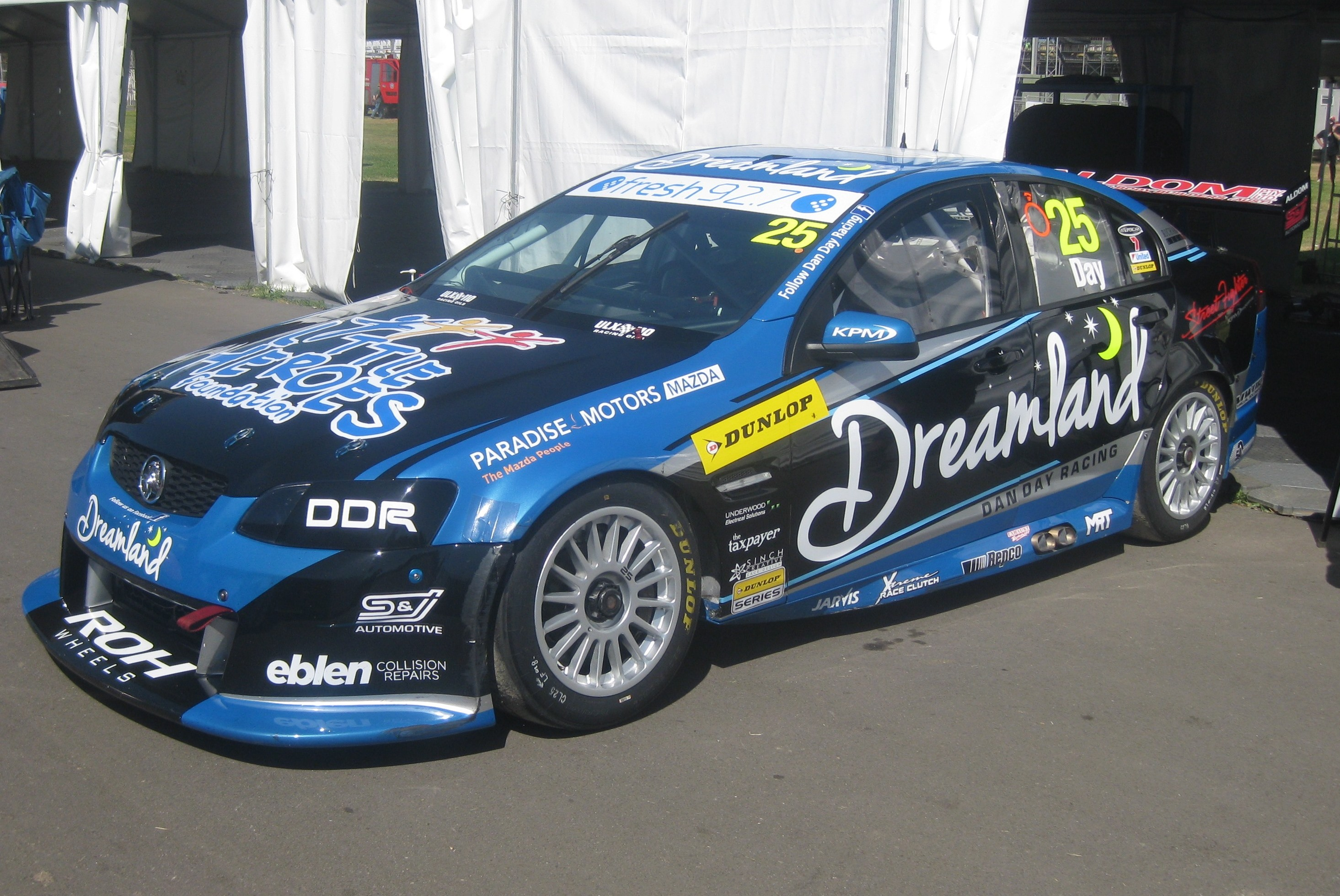
Dan Day (Holden VE Commodore) placed 20th in the series

The following teams and drivers competed in the 2014 series.

Season entries						Endurance entries
Manufacturer	Model	Team	No.	Driver	Rounds	Co-driver
Ford	Falcon FG	Image Racing	10	(Australia) Taz Douglas	1–2, 7	
Ford	Falcon FG	Image Racing	10	(Australia) Jack Le Brocq	3–5	
Ford	Falcon FG	Image Racing	49	(Australia) Jack Le Brocq	1–2, 6	
Ford	Falcon FG	MW Motorsport	26	(New Zealand) Andre Heimgartner	All	(Australia) Steve Owen
Ford	Falcon FG	MW Motorsport	27	(Australia) Ryan Simpson	1	
Ford	Falcon FG	MW Motorsport	27	(Australia) Steve Owen	2	
Ford	Falcon FG	MW Motorsport	27	(Australia) Dean Fiore	3–4	
Ford	Falcon FG	MW Motorsport	27	(Australia) Tim Blanchard	5	
Ford	Falcon FG	MW Motorsport	27	(Australia) Peter Rullo	6	
Ford	Falcon FG	MW Motorsport	28	(Australia) Morgan Haber	1–6	
Ford	Falcon FG	MW Motorsport	28	(Australia) Kurt Kostecki	7	
Ford	Falcon FG	Matt Stone Racing	35	(Australia) Todd Hazelwood	All	
Ford	Falcon FG	Matt Stone Racing	60	(Australia) Michael Hector	1–6	
Ford	Falcon FG	Matt Stone Racing	60	(Australia) Shae Davies	7	
Ford	Falcon FG	Matt Stone Racing	87	(Australia) Ashley Walsh	All	
Ford	Falcon FG	Matt Stone Racing	158	(Australia) Ryal Harris	6	
Ford	Falcon FG	Matt Stone Racing	170	(Australia) Steven Johnson	4–5	
Ford	Falcon FG	GMJ Motorsport	51	(Australia) Jim Pollicina	All	
Ford	Falcon FG	Ford Performance Racing	56	(Australia) Cam Waters	All	
Ford	Falcon FG	Novocastrian Motorsport	58	(Australia) Aaren Russell	All	
Ford	Falcon FG	Paul Morris Motorsport	67	(Australia) Paul Morris	All	
Ford	Falcon FG	Action Racing	71	(Australia) Marcus Zukanovic	All	
Holden	Commodore VE	Team Kean Racing	3	(Australia) Josh Kean	2–7	(Australia) Tony D'Alberto
Holden	Commodore VE	Team Kean Racing	32	(Australia) Josh Kean	1	(Australia) Tony D'Alberto
Holden	Commodore VE	RSport Engineering	11	(Australia) Joshua Hunter	1	
Holden	Commodore VE	RSport Engineering	11	(Australia) Garth Walden	2	
Holden	Commodore VE	RSport Engineering	11	(Australia) Ben Porter	3	
Holden	Commodore VE	RSport Engineering	11	(Australia) Paul McKinnon	4, 7	
Holden	Commodore VE	RSport Engineering	11	(Australia) Phil Woodbury	5	
Holden	Commodore VE	RSport Engineering	44	(Sweden) Fredrik Lestrup	1–4	
Holden	Commodore VE	RSport Engineering	44	(Australia) Brett Hobson	5–7	
Holden	Commodore VE	RSport Engineering	77	(Australia) Tim Macrow	6–7	
Holden	Commodore VE	RSport Engineering	98	(Australia) Aaron Tebb	1–2, 4–6	(Sweden) Fredrik Lestrup
Holden	Commodore VE	Brad Jones Racing	12	(Australia) Macauley Jones	4–7	
Holden	Commodore VE	Brad Jones Racing	20	(Australia) Andrew Jones	All	
Holden	Commodore VE	Brad Jones Racing	42	(New Zealand) Chris Pither	All	
Holden	Commodore VE	Dragon Motor Racing	13	(Australia) Kristian Lindbom	5	
Holden	Commodore VE	Dragon Motor Racing	13	(Australia) James Golding	7	
Holden	Commodore VE	Dragon Motor Racing	24	(Australia) Tim Macrow	2, 4	
Holden	Commodore VE	Dragon Motor Racing	24	(Australia) Ben Schoots	5	
Holden	Commodore VE	Dan Day Racing	25	(Australia) Dan Day	All	
Holden	Commodore VE	Eggleston Motorsport	38	(New Zealand) Ant Pedersen	All	
Holden	Commodore VE	Eggleston Motorsport	54	(Australia) Garry Jacobson	All	
Holden	Commodore VE	Eggleston Motorsport	88	(Australia) Paul Dumbrell	All	
Holden	Commodore VE	THR Developments	45	(Australia) Jay Verdnik	1	
Holden	Commodore VE	THR Developments	45	(Australia) Shane Price	2	
Holden	Commodore VE	THR Developments	46	(Australia) Jordan Ormsby	1–2	
Holden	Commodore VE	GMJ Motorsport	48	(Australia) Geoff Emery	All	
Holden	Commodore VE	GMJ Motorsport	50	(Australia) Matt Hansen	All	
Holden	Commodore VE	Warrin Mining Racing	62	(Australia) Adam Wallis	1, 3–4	
Holden	Commodore VE	Formula Tech Racing	73	(Australia) Brett Stewart	All	
Holden	Commodore VE	McGill Motorsport	75	(Australia) Aaron McGill	All	

== Calendar ==
The series comprised thirteen races at seven venues, with each race being a support race at an International V8 Supercars Championship event.

Series schedule						Results summary	
Rnd	Rce	Event	Circuit	Location	Date	Winning driver	Round winner
1	1	(South Australia) Clipsal 500 Adelaide	Adelaide Street Circuit	Adelaide, South Australia	28 February	(Australia) Ashley Walsh	(Australia) Paul Dumbrell
1	2	(South Australia) Clipsal 500 Adelaide	Adelaide Street Circuit	Adelaide, South Australia	1 March	(Australia) Paul Dumbrell	(Australia) Paul Dumbrell
2	3	(Victoria (state)) Winton 400	Winton Motor Raceway	Benalla, Victoria	5 April	(Australia) Cam Waters	(Australia) Ashley Walsh
2	4	(Victoria (state)) Winton 400	Winton Motor Raceway	Benalla, Victoria	6 April	(Australia) Ashley Walsh	(Australia) Ashley Walsh
3	5	(Western Australia) Perth 400	Barbagallo Raceway	Perth, Western Australia	16 May	(Australia) Paul Dumbrell	(Australia) Ashley Walsh
3	6	(Western Australia) Perth 400	Barbagallo Raceway	Perth, Western Australia	17 May	(New Zealand) Andre Heimgartner	(Australia) Ashley Walsh
4	7	(Queensland) Castrol Townsville 400	Townsville Street Circuit	Townsville, Queensland	4 July	(New Zealand) Chris Pither	(New Zealand) Chris Pither
4	8	(Queensland) Castrol Townsville 400	Townsville Street Circuit	Townsville, Queensland	5 July	(Australia) Ashley Walsh	(New Zealand) Chris Pither
5	9	(Queensland) Coates Hire Ipswich 400	Queensland Raceway	Ipswich, Queensland	2 August	(Australia) Paul Dumbrell	(Australia) Paul Dumbrell
5	10	(Queensland) Coates Hire Ipswich 400	Queensland Raceway	Ipswich, Queensland	3 August	(Australia) Paul Dumbrell	(Australia) Paul Dumbrell
6	11	(New South Wales) Bathurst 250	Mount Panorama Circuit	Bathurst, New South Wales	11 October	(Australia) Paul Dumbrell	(Australia) Paul Dumbrell
7	12	(New South Wales) Sydney NRMA 500	Homebush Street Circuit	Sydney, New South Wales	6 December	(Australia) Paul Dumbrell	(Australia) Cam Waters
7	13	(New South Wales) Sydney NRMA 500	Homebush Street Circuit	Sydney, New South Wales	7 December	(Australia) Cam Waters	(Australia) Cam Waters

== Points system ==
Points were awarded for each race at each two-race round on the following basis.

Position
1st	2nd	3rd	4th	5th	6th	7th	8th	9th	10th	11th	12th	13th	14th	15th	16th	17th	18th	19th	20th	21st	22nd	23rd	24th	25th	26th	27th	28th	29th	30th
150	138	129	120	111	102	96	90	84	78	72	69	66	63	60	57	54	51	48	45	42	39	36	33	30	27	24	21	18	15

Note: Double points were awarded for the single race at Mount Panorama.

== Series standings ==
Pos.	Driver	No.	ADE (South Australia)		WIN (Victoria (state))		BAR (Western Australia)		TOW (Queensland)		QLD (Queensland)		BAT (New South Wales)	SYD (New South Wales)		Pen.	Pts.
1	(Australia) Paul Dumbrell	88	3	1	5	2	1	DNS	2	4	1	1	**1**	**1**	Ret		1686
2	(Australia) Cam Waters	56	**2**	22	1	4	7	Ret	**21**	**2**	**19**	3	2	2	**1**	25	1439
3	(Australia) Ashley Walsh	87	1	**6**	3	1	**2**	2	18	1	5	2	Ret	12	11	25	1373
4	(New Zealand) Chris Pither	42	5	8	11	7	4	7	1	5	Ret	15	3	4	6	25	1361
5	(New Zealand) Andre Heimgartner	26	6	7	9	10	9	1	3	3	Ret	12	7	5	8		1314
6	(Australia) Andrew Jones	20	8	3	4	6	23	6	Ret	Ret	3	11	4	6	3	25	1226
7	(Australia) Aaren Russell	58	9	13	28	14	12	8	4	24	2	8	6	3	2	25	1220
8	(Australia) Todd Hazelwood	35	11	9	15	11	5	5	8	13	Ret	10	5	20	4		1131
9	(Australia) Paul Morris	67	7	10	6	5	10	4	Ret	9	8	4	Ret	8	5		1080
10	(New Zealand) Ant Pedersen	38	22	4	12	9	8	9	9	7	7	5	18	10	Ret		1053
11	(Australia) Garry Jacobson	54	10	5	8	3	11	15	15	11	4	6	Ret	21	Ret	50	886
12	(Australia) Matt Hansen	50	19	19	21	18	14	14	11	15	16	22	14	14	13		798
13	(Australia) Jack Le Brocq	49/10	Ret	Ret	19	15	6	16	22	8	6	7	10				750
14	(Australia) Geoff Emery	48	13	11	13	12	16	12	7	12	Ret	16	Ret	13	10	50	715
15	(Australia) Morgan Haber	28	15	12	7	Ret	24	10	Ret	10	10	13	8			25	713
16	(Australia) Marcus Zukanovic	71	12	Ret	17	13	13	11	12	Ret	9	25	Ret	15	7		666
17	(Australia) Brett Stewart	73	24	20	18	20	18	21	14	19	12	17	Ret	18	18		603
18	(Australia) Michael Hector	60	23	17	23	23	21	18	17	25	22	20	16				537
19	(Australia) Jim Pollicina	51	Ret	21	26	24	20	22	16	Ret	18	21	17	19	16	25	524
20	(Australia) Dan Day	25	21	18	29	21	22	17	Ret	14	17	Ret	19	16	Ret		516
21	(Australia) Dean Fiore	27					3	3	6	6							462
22	(Australia) Macauley Jones	12							10	21	11	23	13	9	Ret		444
23	(Australia) Josh Kean	32/3	Ret	Ret	16	Ret	17	20	20	Ret	13	Ret	12	Ret	15	25	440
24	(Australia) Taz Douglas	10	4	2	10	27								7	Ret	25	431
25	(Australia) Steve Owen	27/26			**2**	8							7				420
26	(Australia) Aaron McGill	75	25	15	24	26	19	24	23	23	14	Ret	Ret	Ret	17	25	395
27	(Sweden) Fredrik Lestrup	44/98	14	Ret	27	16	15	13	13	16			Ret				393
28	(Australia) Brett Hobson	44									Ret	18	11	Ret	14		258
29	(Australia) Steven Johnson	170							5	17	Ret	14					228
30	(Australia) Tim Macrow	24/77			Ret	22			Ret	DNS			15	Ret	12		228
31	(Australia) Aaron Tebb	98	Ret	Ret	25	19			24	22	20	24	Ret				228
32	(Australia) Jordan Ormsby	46	16	16	22	17											207
33	(Australia) Adam Wallis	62	18	Ret			DSQ	23	19	20							180
34	(Australia) Ryal Harris	158											9				168
35	(Australia) Shae Davies	60												11	9		156
36	(Australia) Tony D'Alberto	3											12				138
37	(Australia) Tim Blanchard	27									21	9					126
38	(Australia) Jay Verdnik	45	20	14													108
39	(Australia) Phil Woodbury	11									15	19					108
40	(Australia) Ryan Simpson	27	17	23													90
41	(Australia) Garth Walden	11			20	25											75
42	(Australia) Shane Price	45			14	Ret											63
43	(Australia) James Golding	13												17	Ret		54
44	(Australia) Paul McKinnon	11							Ret	18				DNS	DNS		51
45	(Australia) Ben Porter	11					Ret	19									48
46	(Australia) Kurt Kostecki	28												Ret	19		48
47	(Australia) Joshua Hunter	11	Ret	24													33
	(Australia) Kristian Lindbom	13									Ret	DNS					0
	(Australia) Ben Schoots	24									DNS	DNS					0
	(Australia) Peter Rullo	27											DNS				0
Pos.	Driver	No.	ADE (South Australia)		WIN (Victoria (state))		BAR (Western Australia)		TOW (Queensland)		QLD (Queensland)		BAT (New South Wales)	SYD (New South Wales)		Pen.	Pts.

Colour	Result
Gold	Winner
Silver	Second place
Bronze	Third place
Green	Points classification
Blue	Non-points classification
Blue	Non-classified finish (NC)
Purple	Retired, not classified (Ret)
Red	Did not qualify (DNQ)
Red	Did not pre-qualify (DNPQ)
Black	Disqualified (DSQ)
White	Did not start (DNS)
White	Withdrew (WD)
White	Race cancelled (C)
Blank	Did not practice (DNP)
Blank	Did not arrive (DNA)
Blank	Excluded (EX)

Bold - Pole position
Italics - Fastest lap
