= 2011 Australian Drivers' Championship =

Motor racing competition

The 2011 Australian Drivers' Championship was a CAMS sanctioned national motor racing title with the championship winner receiving the 2011 CAMS Gold Star award. It was the 55th Australian Drivers' Championship and the seventh to be contested with open wheel racing cars constructed in accordance with FIA Formula 3 regulations. It was also recognised as the 11th Australian Formula 3 Championship. The championship was contested over a series which was officially known as the "2011 Australian Formula 3 Drivers Championship for the CAMS Gold Star". The series began on 21 March 2011 at Winton Motor Raceway and finished on 13 November at Symmons Plains Raceway after seven rounds across five different states and territories, with three races at each round.

The championship was won by Queensland driver Chris Gilmour. Gilmour moved into the series lead when British racer and 2008 champion James Winslow missed the Morgan Park round. Winslow returned to the series at the next event. He won a total of eight races to Gilmour's six, but had given away a points lead to Gilmour he would never regain, ultimately falling eight points short of the winners total. Gilmour is the first Australian driver to win the championship since 2007 after three consecutive years of British drivers claiming the title. John Magro, also from Queensland, was the only driver of the 2007 generation cars apart from Gilmour to contest the full series and was rewarded with third place in the championship, but was 32 points behind Gilmour and achieved only one race win. Occasional racer Mat Sofi dominated the Eastern Creek round with three race wins while 2007 champion Tim Macrow won the final race of the season in his older, 2004 specification Dallara.

Four other drivers contested the full series in the older National Class cars in which they also competed for their own class award. As in the outright championship, the National Class winner was not decided until the final race of the season. However the spoiling presence of Macrow limited the number of points Ben Gersekowski could retrieve in his fight with Steel Guiliana, and the latter ultimately claimed the National Class award by seven points. Tasmanian driver Josh Burdon was over sixty points behind Guiliana with Roman Krumins a further twelve points in arrears.

== Class structure ==
Cars competed in two classes:

- Australian Formula 3 Championship – for automobiles constructed in accordance with the FIA Formula 3 regulations that applied in the year of manufacture between 1 January 2002 and 31 December 2007
- National Class – for automobiles constructed in accordance with the FIA Formula 3 regulations that applied in the year of manufacture between 1 January 1999 and 31 December 2004

An additional Invitation Class, for automobiles constructed in accordance with the appropriate regulations that applied in the year of manufacture, was provided for in the regulations, however no eligible cars competed during the course of the season.

== Points System ==
Position	1st	2nd	3rd	4th	5th	6th	7th	8th	9th	10th	Pole; Position	Fastest; Lap
Races 1 & 2	12	9	8	7	6	5	4	3	2	1	1 (R1 only)	1
Race 3	20	15	12	10	8	6	4	3	2	1	0	1

Drivers of cars from all three classes were eligible to score points towards the Australian Drivers' Championship. National Class and Invitation Class drivers were also eligible to score points towards their respective class awards using the same points system as applied for the outright championship, but based on their relative finishing position within their class in each race.

== Teams and drivers ==
The following teams and drivers contested the 2011 Australian Drivers' Championship. Entries sourced in part from:

Team	Class	Chassis	Engine	No	Driver
Transwest	Gold Star	Dallara F307	Mugen-Honda	2	(Australia) Mat Sofi
Team BRM	Gold Star	Dallara F307	HWA-Mercedes-Benz	3	(Australia) John Magro
Team BRM	Gold Star	Dallara F307	HWA-Mercedes-Benz	4	(Australia) Kristian Lindbom
R-Tek Motorsport	Gold Star	Dallara F307	HWA-Mercedes-Benz	6	(Australia) Bryce Moore
R-Tek Motorsport	National	Dallara F304	Spiess-Opel	7	(Australia) Steel Giuliania
R-Tek Motorsport	National	Dallara F304	Spiess-Opel	8	(Australia) Josh Burdon
R-Tek Motorsport	Gold Star	Dallara F307	HWA-Mercedes-Benz	9	(United Kingdom) James Winslow
Astuti Motorsport	Gold Star	Dallara F307	Renault	11	(Australia) Mat Sofi
BF Racing	National	Dallara F304	Spiess-Opel	14	(Australia) Roman Krumins
BF Racing	National	Dallara F304	Spiess-Opel	42	(Australia) Ben Gersekowski
Gilmour Racing	Gold Star	Dallara F307	HWA-Mercedes-Benz	17	(Australia) Chris Gilmour
Fusion Formula	National	Dallara F304	Renault-Sodemo	25	(Australia) Tim Macrow

== Race calendar ==
The championship was contested over a seven-round series.

A long-time bastion of the Shannons Nationals Motor Racing Championships the 2011 season saw the Gold Star shift several events onto the International V8 Supercars Championship calendar, after occasional appearances at the Clipsal 500 and other major events. The series appeared on the program of V8 Supercar rounds at Winton, Symmons Plains, and, in a first for the category, Hidden Valley Raceway in the Northern Territory.

Round	Race	Circuit	Date	Pole position	Fastest lap	Winning driver	Winning team
1	1	(Victoria (state)) Winton Motor Raceway	20–22 May	John Magro	James Winslow	James Winslow	R-Tek Motorsport
1	2	(Victoria (state)) Winton Motor Raceway	20–22 May	John Magro	Bryce Moore	James Winslow	R-Tek Motorsport
1	3	(Victoria (state)) Winton Motor Raceway	20–22 May	John Magro	race cancelled due to rain		
2	4	(Northern Territory) Hidden Valley Raceway	17–19 June	James Winslow	Bryce Moore	James Winslow	R-Tek Motorsport
2	5	(Northern Territory) Hidden Valley Raceway	17–19 June	James Winslow	Bryce Moore	John Magro	Team BRM
2	6	(Northern Territory) Hidden Valley Raceway	17–19 June	James Winslow	John Magro	Kristian Lindbom	Team BRM
3	7	(New South Wales) Eastern Creek Raceway	14–17 July	Mat Sofi	James Winslow	Mat Sofi	Transwest
3	8	(New South Wales) Eastern Creek Raceway	14–17 July	Mat Sofi	James Winslow	Mat Sofi	Transwest
3	9	(New South Wales) Eastern Creek Raceway	14–17 July	Mat Sofi	Mat Sofi	Mat Sofi	Transwest
4	10	(Queensland) Morgan Park Raceway	12–14 August	John Magro	John Magro	Chris Gilmour	Gilmour Racing
4	11	(Queensland) Morgan Park Raceway	12–14 August	John Magro	John Magro	Chris Gilmour	Gilmour Racing
4	12	(Queensland) Morgan Park Raceway	12–14 August	John Magro	Chris Gilmour	Chris Gilmour	Gilmour Racing
5	13	(Victoria (state)) Sandown Raceway	9–11 September	John Magro	James Winslow	James Winslow	R-Tek Motorsport
5	14	(Victoria (state)) Sandown Raceway	9–11 September	John Magro	James Winslow	Chris Gilmour	Gilmour Racing
5	15	(Victoria (state)) Sandown Raceway	9–11 September	John Magro	James Winslow	James Winslow	R-Tek Motorsport
6	16	(Victoria (state)) Phillip Island	4–6 November	James Winslow	John Magro	James Winslow	R-Tek Motorsport
6	17	(Victoria (state)) Phillip Island	4–6 November	James Winslow	James Winslow	James Winslow	R-Tek Motorsport
6	18	(Victoria (state)) Phillip Island	4–6 November	James Winslow	Chris Gilmour	Chris Gilmour	Gilmour Racing
7	19	(Tasmania) Symmons Plains Raceway	11–13 November	James Winslow	John Magro	Chris Gilmour	Gilmour Racing
7	20	(Tasmania) Symmons Plains Raceway	11–13 November	James Winslow	James Winslow	James Winslow	R-Tek Motorsport
7	21	(Tasmania) Symmons Plains Raceway	11–13 November	James Winslow	James Winslow	Tim Macrow	Fusion Formula

== Results ==
=== Drivers' championship ===
Pos	Driver	WIN 1	WIN 2	WIN 3	HID 1	HID 2	HID 3	EAS 1	EAS 2	EAS 3	MOR 1	MOR 2	MOR 3	SAN 1	SAN 2	SAN 3	PHI 1	PHI 2	PHI 3	SYM 1	SYM 2	SYM 3	Pts
GOLD STAR
1	(Australia) Chris Gilmour	4	2	-	4	Ret	2	3	3	3	1	1	1	2	1	2	3	3	1	1	5	5	210
2	(United Kingdom) James Winslow	1	1	-	1	Ret	4	2	2	2				1	2	1	1	1	3	4	1	2	202
3	(Australia) John Magro	2	Ret	-	6	1	6	4	4	4	2	3	2	3	Ret	3	2	2	2	2	3	3	178
4	(Australia) Steel Giuliania	5	6	-	7	5	8	7	5	7	4	5	3	4	3	5	7	Ret	5	6	6	8	111
5	(Australia) Ben Gersekowski	8	4	-	8	6	7	6	6	6	5	4	4	6	Ret	6	6	6	6	7	7	6	102
6	(Australia) Mat Sofi							1	1	1							4	4	4	5	4	4	93
7	(Australia) Bryce Moore	3	3	-	3	2	5	5	9	5	3	2	Ret										77
8	(Australia) Josh Burdon	6	5	-	10	7	9	Ret	7	8	Ret	DNS	DNS	5	5	4	5	5	7	8	8	7	73
9	(Australia) Roman Krumins	7	7	-	9	8	10	8	8	9	Ret	6	5	7	4	7	8	7	8	9	9	9	66
10	(Australia) Tim Macrow				5	4	3													3	2	1	62
11	(Australia) Kristian Lindbom				2	3	1																37
NATIONAL
1	(Australia) Steel Guiliania	5	6	-	7	5	8	7	5	7	4	5	3	4	3	5	7	Ret	5	6	6	8	228
2	(Australia) Ben Gersekowski	8	4	-	8	6	7	6	6	6	5	4	4	6	Ret	6	6	6	6	7	7	6	221
3	(Australia) Josh Burdon	6	5	-	10	7	9	Ret	7	8	Ret	DNS	DNS	5	5	4	5	5	7	8	8	7	162
4	(Australia) Roman Krumins	7	7	-	9	8	10	8	8	9	Ret	6	5	7	4	7	8	7	8	9	9	9	150
5	(Australia) Tim Macrow				5	4	3													3	2	1	97

Colour	Result
Gold	Winner
Silver	Second place
Bronze	Third place
Green	Points classification
Blue	Non-points classification
Blue	Non-classified finish (NC)
Purple	Retired, not classified (Ret)
Red	Did not qualify (DNQ)
Red	Did not pre-qualify (DNPQ)
Black	Disqualified (DSQ)
White	Did not start (DNS)
White	Withdrew (WD)
White	Race cancelled (C)
Blank	Did not practice (DNP)
Blank	Did not arrive (DNA)
Blank	Excluded (EX)

Note: Race 3 at the opening round at Winton was cancelled due to heavy rain.

Note: There were no competitors in the Invitation Class at any of the seven rounds.

== See also ==
- Australian Drivers' Championship
- Australian Formula 3
