= Dragon Motor Racing =

Australian motor racing team

- Team Principal: Tony Klein
- Debut: 2014
- Final Season: 2017

Dragon Motor Racing is an Australian motor racing team, established in 2014.

== History ==
Dragon Motor Racing was founded in 2014 by Tony Klein with the aim of competing in the V8 Supercars Championship. It made its first race appearance at the Winton round of the 2014 Development Series, with Tim Macrow driving an ex Paul Weel Racing Holden Commodore VE. It is based in the Melbourne suburb of Mordialloc.

Dragon Motor Racing has also purchased an ex Garry Rogers Motorsport Commodore VE from Minda Motorsport, and the two Commodore VFs Garry Rogers Motorsport campaigned in 2013.

The team successfully applied to race at the 2014 Sandown 500 and Bathurst 1000 races; however, the team did not appear having run into financial difficulties.
