= 2012 Dunlop V8 Supercar Series =

Motor racing competition

The 2012 Dunlop V8 Supercar Series was an Australian motor racing competition for V8 Supercars. It was the thirteenth running of the V8 Supercar Development series. Supporting the 2012 International V8 Supercars Championship, it began on 1 March at the Clipsal 500 and ended on 2 December at the Sydney 500 after eighteen races held over seven rounds. 2012 was the last year in which the Ford BF Falcon was eligible for the series.

The series was won by Scott McLaughlin driving a Ford FG Falcon.

== Calendar ==
The series was contested over seven rounds at seven V8 Supercars Championship events.

Rd.	Event	Circuit	Location	Date	Round format	Winner	Car
1	(South Australia) Clipsal 500	Adelaide Street Circuit	Adelaide, South Australia	1–4 Mar	Two races	(Australia) Chaz Mostert	Ford FG Falcon
2	(Western Australia) Trading Post Perth Challenge	Barbagallo Raceway	Perth, Western Australia	4–6 May	Three races	(New Zealand) Scott McLaughlin	Ford FG Falcon
3	(Queensland) Sucrogen Townsville 400	Townsville Street Circuit	Townsville, Queensland	6–8 Jul	Three races	(New Zealand) Scott McLaughlin	Ford FG Falcon
4	(Queensland) Coates Hire Ipswich 300	Queensland Raceway	Ipswich, Queensland	3–5 Aug	Three races	(Australia) Chaz Mostert	Ford FG Falcon
5	(New South Wales) Supercheap Auto Bathurst 1000	Mount Panorama Circuit	Bathurst, New South Wales	4–7 Oct	Two races	(Australia) Nick Percat	Holden VE Commodore
6	(Victoria (state)) Winton Motor Raceway	Winton Motor Raceway	Benalla, Victoria	16–18 Nov	Three races	(Australia) Nick Percat	Holden VE Commodore
7	(New South Wales) Sydney Telstra 500	Homebush Street Circuit	Sydney, New South Wales	30 Nov – 2 Dec	Two races	(Australia) Scott Pye	Holden VE Commodore

== Teams and drivers ==
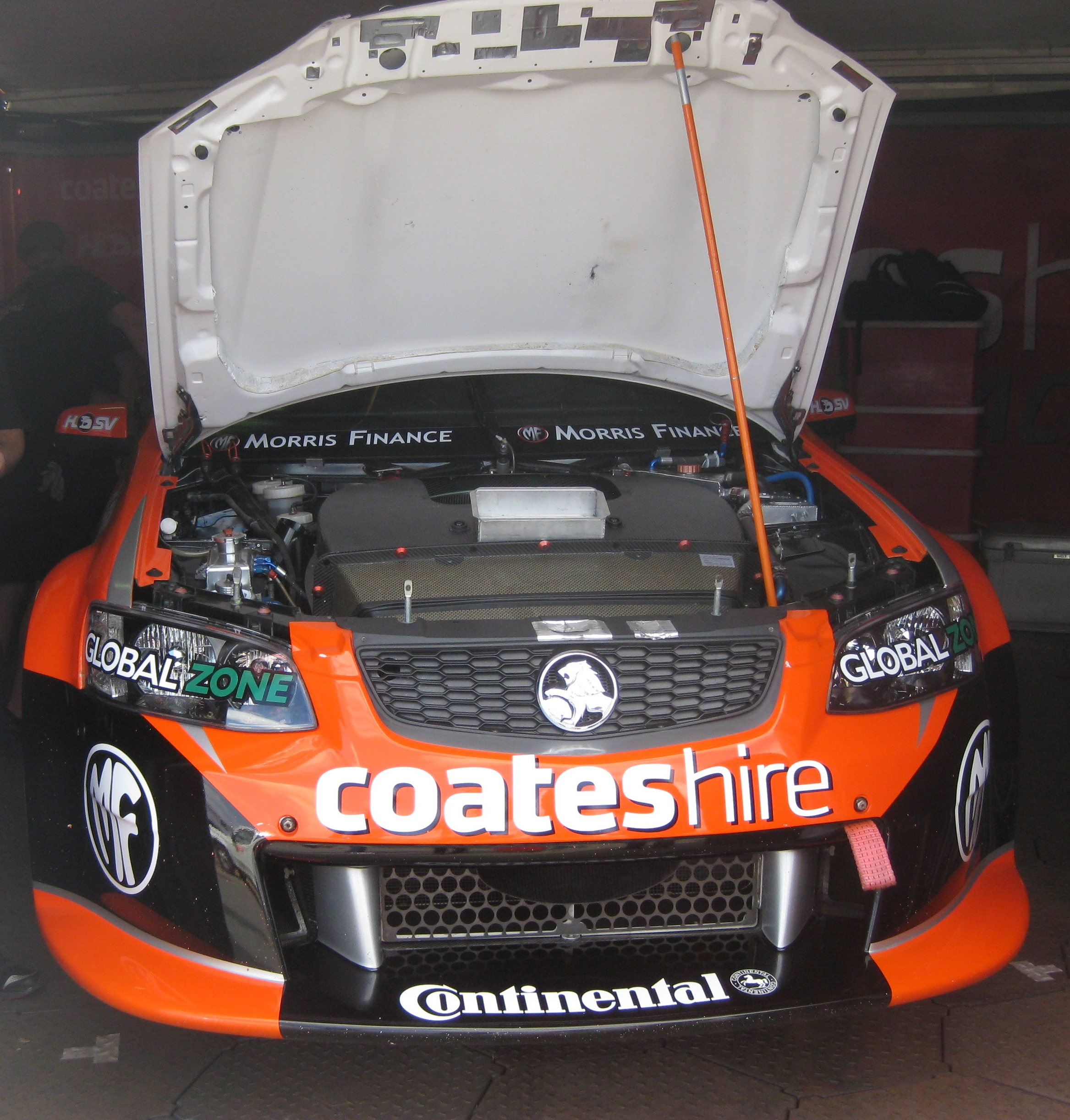
Nick Percat placed fourth driving a Holden VE Commodore for Walkinshaw Racing

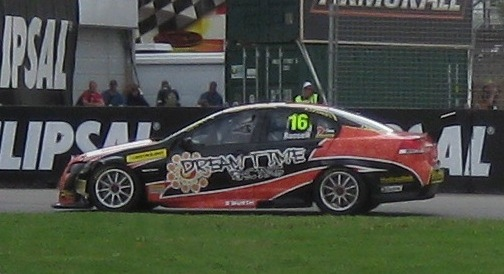
David Russell placed 18th driving a Holden VE Commodore for Dreamtime Racing

The following teams and drivers contested the 2012 Dunlop V8 Supercar Series.

Team	Vehicle	No	Driver	Rounds
Dreamtime Racing	Holden VE Commodore	16	(Australia) David Russell	1–4
Dreamtime Racing	Holden VE Commodore	77	(Australia) Cameron Waters	1–4
Brad Jones Racing	Holden VE Commodore	20	(Australia) Andrew Jones	All
Pacific Hoists Racing	Holden VE Commodore	24	(Australia) Nandi Kiss	All
MW Motorsport
MW Motorsport	Ford BF Falcon	26	(Australia) Morgan Haber	4
MW Motorsport	Ford FG Falcon	27	(Australia) Tim Blanchard	1–5
MW Motorsport	Ford BF Falcon	27	(Australia) Elliot Barbour	6
MW Motorsport	Ford BF Falcon	27	(Australia) Morgan Haber	7
MW Motorsport	Ford BF Falcon	28	(Australia) Luke Youlden	1–5
MW Motorsport	Ford FG Falcon	28	(Australia) Luke Youlden	6–7
Eggleston Motorsport	Holden VE Commodore	38	(Australia) Ben Eggleston	5
Greg Murphy Racing	Holden VE Commodore	44	(Australia) Matt Hansen	2
Greg Murphy Racing	Holden VE Commodore	44	(Australia) Jim Pollicina	7
Greg Murphy Racing	Holden VE Commodore	45	(Australia) Dale Wood	All
Greg Murphy Racing	Holden VE Commodore	48	(Australia) Geoff Emery	All
Greg Murphy Racing	Holden VE Commodore	71	(Australia) Marcus Zukanovic	1–2
Ford Performance Racing	Ford FG Falcon	56	(Australia) Chaz Mostert	All
Novocastrian Motorsport	Ford BF Falcon	58	(Australia) Drew Russell	All
Novocastrian Motorsport	Ford BF Falcon	59	(Australia) Aaren Russell	All
Novocastrian Motorsport	Ford BF Falcon	60	(Australia) Michael Hector	All
Warrin Mining	Holden VE Commodore	62	(Australia) Adam Wallis	1–2, 4–6
Paul Morris Motorsport	Holden VE Commodore	67	(Australia) Paul Morris	3–4
Action Racing	Holden VE Commodore	71	(Australia) Marcus Zukanovic	3–6
Brett Stewart Racing	Holden VE Commodore	73	(Australia) Brett Stewart	All
McGill Motorsport	Ford BF Falcon	75	(Australia) Aaron McGill	1–5, 7
Triple Eight Race Engineering	Holden VE Commodore	80	(Australia) Scott Pye	All
Matt Stone Racing	Ford BF Falcon	86	(New Zealand) Daniel Jilesen	1–5
Matt Stone Racing	Ford BF Falcon	87	(Australia) Ashley Walsh	1–5
Matt Stone Racing	Ford FG Falcon	87	(Australia) Ashley Walsh	6–7
Matt Stone Racing	Ford FG Falcon	93	(New Zealand) Scott McLaughlin	3–7
Stone Brothers Racing	Ford FG Falcon	93	(New Zealand) Scott McLaughlin	1–2
Minda Motorsport	Holden VE Commodore	98	(Australia) Elliot Barbour	1–5
Minda Motorsport	Holden VE Commodore	98	(Australia) Glen Wood	6
Walkinshaw Racing	Holden VE Commodore	222	(Australia) Nick Percat	All
Lucas Dumbrell Motorsport	Holden VE Commodore	300	(Australia) Kristian Lindbom	1
Sonic Motor Racing Services	Ford FG Falcon	777	(Australia) Rodney Jane	All
Sonic Motor Racing Services	Ford BF Falcon	999	(Australia) George Miedecke	All

== Points system ==
Series points were awarded at each race according to the following table:

Position	1st	2nd	3rd	4th	5th	6th	7th	8th	9th	10th	11th	12th	13th	14th	15th	16th	17th	18th	19th	20th	21st	22nd	23rd	24th	25th	26th	27th	28th	29th	30th
2 Race Format	150	138	129	120	111	102	96	90	84	78	72	69	66	63	60	57	54	51	48	45	42	39	36	33	30	27	24	21	18	15
3 Race Format Races 1 & 3	120	110	103	96	89	82	77	72	67	62	57	55	53	51	48	46	43	41	38	36	33	30	28	26	24	21	19	17	15	12
3 Race Format Race 2	60	56	52	48	44	40	38	36	34	32	30	28	26	24	23	22	21	20	19	18	17	16	15	14	13	12	11	9	7	6

== Driver standings ==
Pos	Driver	No.	ADE		BAR			TOW			QLD			BAT		WIN			SYD		Pen	Pts
1	(New Zealand) Scott McLaughlin	93	2	3	3	4	1	1	1	2	3	2	3	13	6	4	10	4	1	3		1761
2	(Australia) Scott Pye	80	5	7	1	9	2	4	Ret	11	2	4	2	3	3	2	11	2	2	1		1688
3	(Australia) Chaz Mostert	56	1	1	4	5	3	3	19	3	1	5	1	2	2	5	19	5	6	2	100	1665
4	(Australia) Nick Percat	222	3	2	8	1	Ret	2	3	1	4	23	10	1	1	1	2	1	Ret	5		1561
5	(Australia) Luke Youlden	28	6	4	5	3	4	6	8	20	6	Ret	7	5	4	3	3	7	8	8		1415
6	(Australia) Dale Wood	45	15	11	17	Ret	DNS	13	17	8	7	6	6	4	5	6	1	3	3	4		1245
7	(Australia) Ashley Walsh	87	4	5	2	7	7	5	5	Ret	5	3	4	20	11	8	8	6	DNS	7	25	1204
8	(Australia) Geoff Emery	48	7	18	19	13	14	17	9	6	18	11	12	9	10	10	15	11	5	9		1046
9	(Australia) George Miedecke	999	10	15	12	Ret	12	10	2	5	13	10	15	7	8	11	4	10	12	Ret	25	985
10	(Australia) Andrew Jones	20	14	6	7	Ret	DNS	9	4	Ret	10	8	8	18	9	7	16	Ret	4	6		983
11	(Australia) Drew Russell	58	11	12	15	12	9	15	10	7	16	14	13	8	12	13	5	9	9	Ret		971
12	(Australia) Rodney Jane	777	8	16	10	6	8	11	Ret	14	15	15	11	22	13	12	7	8	11	10	50	927
13	(Australia) Marcus Zukanovic	71	12	9	14	10	15	Ret	13	10	11	Ret	24	11	14	16	14	13	10	11		863
14	(Australia) Tim Blanchard	27	Ret	8	6	2	5	7	20	4	19	16	9	6	7						25	808
15	(Australia) Aaren Russell	59	18	13	16	14	13	14	15	19	17	13	16	10	Ret	14	6	18	7	Ret	50	723
16	(Australia) Elliot Barbour	98/27	13	17	13	11	10	18	7	16	20	12	14	12	Ret	9	20	12				714
17	(Australia) Brett Stewart	73	17	20	20	16	16	19	12	17	23	19	18	17	16	19	17	14	13	Ret		687
18	(Australia) David Russell	16	9	14	11	DSQ	6	8	6	9	9	1	5								25	656
19	(Australia) Michael Hector	60	19	22	24	Ret	20	Ret	16	18	24	24	21	19	Ret	18	13	16	15	14		569
20	(Australia) Adam Wallis	62	16	21	22	17	18				22	20	19	15	18	17	12	15				507
21	(New Zealand) Daniel Jilesen	86	Ret	DNS	9	8	21	16	11	15	14	18	20	16	15							484
22	(Australia) Nandi Kiss	24	Ret	23	23	18	19	20	14	Ret	25	21	23	DNS	DNS	20	18	17	Ret	15		410
23	(Australia) Cameron Waters	77	Ret	DNS	18	15	11	12	Ret	12	8	7	17									384
24	(Australia) Paul Morris	67						22	Ret	13	12	9	25									196
25	(Australia) Aaron McGill	75	Ret	19	Ret	DNS	DNS	21	18	Ret	Ret	22	22	21	Ret				DNS	DNS		189
26	(Australia) Morgan Haber	26/27									21	17	26						Ret	13		141
27	(Australia) Jim Pollicina	44																	14	12		132
28	(Australia) Ben Eggleston	38												14	17							117
29	(Australia) Glen Wood	98														15	9	Ret				72
30	(Australia) Kristian Lindbom	300	Ret	10																	25	53
31	(Australia) Matt Hansen	44			21	Ret	17														25	51

Colour	Result
Gold	Winner
Silver	Second place
Bronze	Third place
Green	Points classification
Blue	Non-points classification
Blue	Non-classified finish (NC)
Purple	Retired, not classified (Ret)
Red	Did not qualify (DNQ)
Red	Did not pre-qualify (DNPQ)
Black	Disqualified (DSQ)
White	Did not start (DNS)
White	Withdrew (WD)
White	Race cancelled (C)
Blank	Did not practice (DNP)
Blank	Did not arrive (DNA)
Blank	Excluded (EX)
