= 2019 Super3 Series =

Motor racing competition

Seasons
- ← 2018 2021 →

The 2019 Super3 Series (known for commercial reasons as the Kumho Tyre Super3 Series) was the twelfth season of the Super3 Series, since its inception in 2008. Following an agreement between V8 Touring Cars and Supercars, the series undertook a name change from the "V8 Touring Car National Series" to "Super3", although the series will continue to be run by category managers Rob and Liam Curkpatrick.

The defending champion for the 2019 season is Tyler Everingham, whilst Jim Pollicina and Andy Cantrell are the respective Kumho and Heritage defending champions.

== Teams and drivers ==
The following teams and drivers are currently under contract to compete in the 2019 championship:

Manufacturer	Model	Team	Driver details			
Manufacturer	Model	Team	No.	Driver	Class	Rounds
Ford	AU Falcon	Turbo Brisbane	68	(Australia) Jonathan Beikoff	H	3
Ford	BA Falcon	Twin City Roller Doors	19	(Australia) Mark Tracey	K	1
Ford	BF Falcon	Edge Consulting Engineers	3	(Australia) Shane Hunt	K	1, 3
Ford	BF Falcon	Auddino Racing	4	(Australia) Tony Auddino	K	All
Ford	BF Falcon	TFMaintenance	17	(Australia) Jason Foley	K	1–3, 5
Ford	FG Falcon	MW Motorsport	5	(Australia) Hamish Ribarits	C	All
Ford	FG Falcon	MW Motorsport	48	(Australia) Nic Carroll	C	All
Ford	FG Falcon	MW Motorsport	78	(Australia) Zak Best	C	All
Ford	FG Falcon	Matt Stone Racing	9	(Australia) Bradley Neill	K	All
Ford	FG Falcon	Matt Stone Racing	16	(Australia) Joel Heinrich	C	4–5
Ford	FG Falcon	Matt Stone Racing	35	(Australia) Jason Gomersall	K	All
Ford	FG Falcon	Matt Stone Racing	39	(Australia) Chris Smerdon	K	1–4
Ford	FG Falcon	Anderson Motorsport	11	(Australia) Jayden Ojeda	C	All
Ford	FG Falcon	Image Racing	12	(Australia) Matt McLean	C	1–2, 5
Ford	FG Falcon	Aussie Driver Search	37	(United States) Matt Powers	C	1
Ford	FG Falcon	Paul Morris Motorsport	67	(Australia) Broc Feeney	C	All
Ford	FG Falcon	Mac Motorsport	69	(Australia) Jon McCorkindale	C	All
Holden	Commodore VE	Page Bros Jayco	2	(Australia) Steven Page	K	All
Holden	Commodore VE	Pollicina Motorsports	7	(Australia) Jim Pollicina	K	1, 3–5
Holden	Commodore VE	Pollicina Motorsports	888	(Australia) Jim Pollicina	K	2
Holden	Commodore VE	Pollicina Motorsports	15	(Australia) Dean Lillie	K	5
Holden	Commodore VE	Brad Jones Racing	8	(New Zealand) Madeline Stewart	C	All
Holden	Commodore VE	Brad Jones Racing	14	(Australia) Josh Fife	C	All
Holden	Commodore VE	KE Motorsport	21	(Australia) Kyle Ensbey	C	1, 3
Holden	Commodore VE	Paul Morris Motorsport	66	(Australia) Jack Sipp	K	3
Holden	Commodore VE	Strong Motorsport	75	(Australia) Brendan Strong	K	3
Holden	Commodore VE	Garry Hills Racing	76	(Australia) Garry Hills	K	1–2
Holden	Commodore VE	Rsport Race Engineering	84	(Australia) Emily Duggan	K	1–2
Holden	Commodore VE	Protrack Automotive Performance	96	(Australia) Gary Collins	K	4
Holden	Commodore VZ	HF Racing	23	(Australia) Francois Habib	K	1–2, 4

== Calendar ==
The calendar for the 2019 championship consisted of five rounds, including four that ran in support of Supercars events:

Round	Event name	Circuit	Location	Date
1	Phillip Island SuperSprint	(Victoria (state)) Phillip Island Grand Prix Circuit	Phillip Island, Victoria	12–14 April
2	Winton SuperSprint	(Victoria (state)) Winton Motor Raceway	Benalla, Victoria	24–26 May
3	Ipswich SuperSprint	Queensland Raceway	Ipswich, Queensland	26–28 July
4	The Bend SuperSprint	(South Australia) The Bend Motorsport Park	Tailem Bend, South Australia	23–25 August
5	Sandown Shannons Nationals	(Victoria (state)) Sandown Raceway	Springvale, Victoria	20–22 September

=== Calendar changes ===
- The category returned to Sandown Raceway for the Sandown Shannons Nationals.
- Sydney Motorsport Park was removed from the calendar after being omitted from the Supercars calendar.

== Results and standings ==
=== Season summary ===
Round		Event	Pole position	Fastest lap	Winning driver	Winning team
1	1	Phillip Island SuperSprint (Phillip Island Grand Prix Circuit, Victoria)	(Australia) Broc Feeney	(Australia) Jayden Ojeda	(Australia) Broc Feeney	Paul Morris Motorsport
1	2	Phillip Island SuperSprint (Phillip Island Grand Prix Circuit, Victoria)		(United States) Matt Powers	(Australia) Zak Best	MW Motorsport
1	3	Phillip Island SuperSprint (Phillip Island Grand Prix Circuit, Victoria)		(Australia) Hamish Ribarits	(Australia) Hamish Ribarits	MW Motorsport
2	1	Winton SuperSprint (Winton Motor Raceway, Victoria)	(Australia) Hamish Ribarits	(Australia) Hamish Ribarits	(Australia) Zak Best	MW Motorsport
2	2	Winton SuperSprint (Winton Motor Raceway, Victoria)		(Australia) Zak Best	(Australia) Zak Best	MW Motorsport
2	3	Winton SuperSprint (Winton Motor Raceway, Victoria)		(Australia) Jayden Ojeda	(Australia) Jayden Ojeda	Anderson Motorsport
3	1	Ipswich SuperSprint (Queensland Raceway, Queensland)	(Australia) Zak Best	(Australia) Zak Best	(Australia) Zak Best	MW Motorsport
3	2	Ipswich SuperSprint (Queensland Raceway, Queensland)		(Australia) Josh Fife	(Australia) Zak Best	MW Motorsport
3	3	Ipswich SuperSprint (Queensland Raceway, Queensland)		(Australia) Jayden Ojeda	(Australia) Jayden Ojeda	Anderson Motorsport
4	1	The Bend SuperSprint (The Bend Motorsport Park, South Australia)	(Australia) Hamish Ribarits	(Australia) Zak Best	(Australia) Jayden Ojeda	Anderson Motorsport
4	2	The Bend SuperSprint (The Bend Motorsport Park, South Australia)		(Australia) Broc Feeney	(Australia) Jayden Ojeda	Anderson Motorsport
4	3	The Bend SuperSprint (The Bend Motorsport Park, South Australia)		(Australia) Broc Feeney	(Australia) Zak Best	MW Motorsport
5	1	Sandown Shannons Nationals (Sandown Raceway, Victoria)	(Australia) Broc Feeney	(Australia) Jayden Ojeda	(Australia) Hamish Ribarits	MW Motorsport
5	2	Sandown Shannons Nationals (Sandown Raceway, Victoria)		(Australia) Broc Feeney	(Australia) Josh Fife	Brad Jones Racing
5	3	Sandown Shannons Nationals (Sandown Raceway, Victoria)		(Australia) Zak Best	(Australia) Josh Fife	Brad Jones Racing

=== Series standings ===
Pos.	Driver	No.	Class	PHI (Victoria (state))			WIN (Victoria (state))			QLD (Queensland)			BEN (South Australia)			SAN (Victoria (state))			Pen.	Points
1	(Australia) Broc Feeney	67	C	1	7	2	2	7	3	2	4	2	3	2	2	3	2	3		562
2	(Australia) Jayden Ojeda	11	C	4	5	5	4	6	1	4	2	1	1	1	4	5	4	2		538
3	(Australia) Hamish Ribarits	5	C	2	6	1	8	2	2	6	9	5	2	3	6	1	3	5		494
4	(Australia) Zak Best	78	C	3	1	3	1	1	Ret	1	1	Ret	16	4	1	4	9	4		454
5	(Australia) Josh Fife	14	C	12	4	7	5	5	Ret	5	3	3	6	5	7	2	1	1		413
6	(Australia) Nic Carroll	48	C	5	2	21	3	3	14	3	5	4	13	6	3	6	5	6		376
7	(Australia) Jon McCorkindale	69	C	7	15	6	10	4	Ret	8	6	6	4	Ret	Ret	8	7	Ret		215
8	(Australia) Bradley Neill	9	K	13	12	11	12	8	10	7	7	13	8	7	11	12	Ret	10		192
9	(Australia) Jim Pollicina	7	K	11	11	9	11	Ret	7	10	8	7	Ret	9	8	13	12	15		190
10	(Australia) Chris Smerdon	39	K	14	8	12	6	12	5	14	12	12	7	11	9					178
11	(Australia) Matt McLean	12	C	8	17	8	7	9	4							7	6	9		170
12	(Australia) Jason Gomersall	35	K	15	9	17	13	10	11	9	13	11	12	12	13	15	14	13		150
13	(Australia) Steven Page	2	K	17	13	13	17	13	9				9	13	14	9	Ret	11		139
14	(New Zealand) Madeline Stewart	8	C	18	19	16	15	Ret	8	Ret	14	9	11	11	10	14	Ret	14		124
15	(Australia) Joel Heinrich	16	C										5	8	5	11	8	7		124
16	(Australia) Tony Auddino	4	K	Ret	16	14	14	14	Ret	Ret	Ret	14	10	14	12	17	11	16		95
17	(United States) Matt Powers	37	C	6	3	4														92
18	(Australia) Jason Foley	17	K	21	20	19	18	11	12	13	Ret	Ret				16	13	12		67
19	(Australia) Emily Duggan	84	K	16	18	15	16	16	6											57
20	(Australia) Dean Lille	15	K													10	10	8		45
21	(Australia) Francois Habib	23	K	22	21	20	19	15	13				15	15	15					45
22	(Australia) Jack Sipp	66	K							11	10	8								44
23	(Australia) Kyle Ensbey	21	C	19	10	10				DNS	DNS	DNS								30
24	(Australia) Garry Hills	76	K	9	Ret	DNS	9	17	DNS											30
25	(Australia) Gary Collins	96	K										14	16	16					20
26	(Australia) Shane Hunt	3	K	17	14	18				DNS	DNS	DNS								16
27	(Australia) Mark Tracey	19	K	10	Ret	DNS														11
28	(Australia) Brendan Strong	75	K							Ret	11	Ret								10
29	(Australia) Jonathan Beikoff	68	H							DNS	15	Ret								6
Pos.	Driver	No.	Class	PHI (Victoria (state))			WIN (Victoria (state))			QLD (Queensland)			BEN (South Australia)			SAN (Victoria (state))			Pen.	Points
