= Madeline Stewart =

New Zealand racing driver

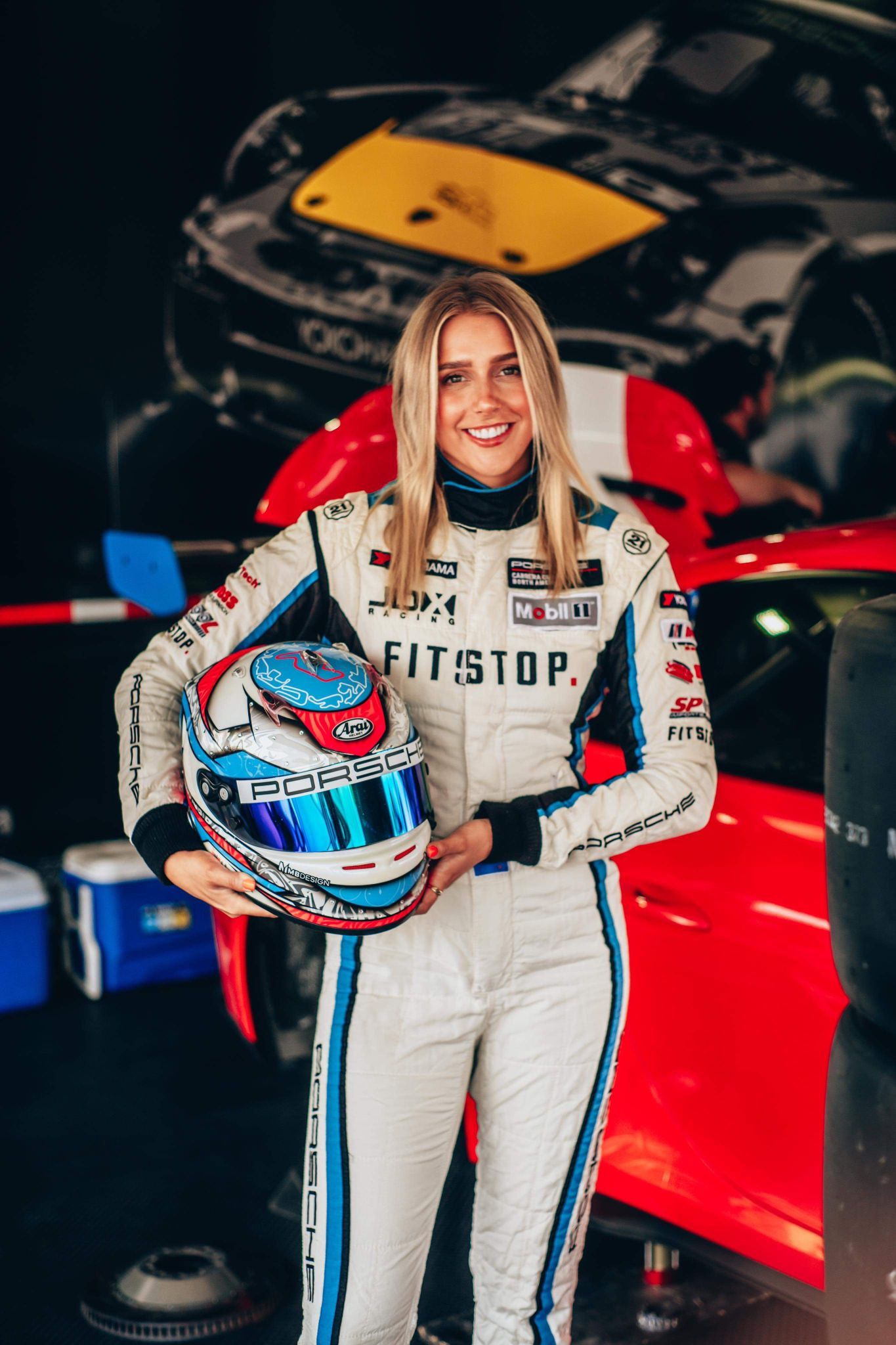
- Stewart in 2024
- Nationality: New Zealander
- Born: Madeline Eva Stewart; 2 August 2000 (age 25) Wellington, New Zealand

Porsche Carrera Cup North America
- Years active: 2024
- Teams: JDX Racing
- Car number: 82

Madeline Eva Stewart (born 2 August 2000) is a New Zealand professional racing driver competing in Porsche Carrera Cup North America. She is a graduate of the Porsche Female Driver Development Programme and is part of a long-term sports car racing pathway within the Porsche and IMSA ecosystem.

== Karting career ==
Born in Wellington, Madeline and her sister Ashleigh were well known in the karting scene in both New Zealand and Australia. The Stewart Sisters Racing duo competed on both sides of the Tasman Sea predominantly in Rotax based series before Madeline moved to KZ2 and Ashleigh to IAME X30.

=== Early years ===
Stewart began racing go-karts at Kartsport Wellington in 2010 at the age of nine. She raced in the Cadet Class for two years with her most notable achievement being a win in her local club's annual enduro race in 2011. The race started on a wet track with Madeline, the only driver to start on slicks. She endured a tough start to the race falling a long way back before a late-race charge on a drying track saw her take the lead with one lap to go, winning by ten seconds.

In 2012, Stewart moved up to the Junior Restricted class, which she did not enjoy and moved quickly up to Junior where she saw significant success including second at the South Island Sprint Championships in 2015 and Pole position at the 2016 Kartsport New Zealand National Sprint Championship.

=== Australia ===
In 2013, Stewart and her sister Ashleigh ventured across the Tasman for the first time to race in the Junior Rotax Trophy class at the Australian Rotax Pro-Tour. That was the start of a four-year journey racing against the best karters in Australia. The challenge of racing in bigger and often more competitive fields than in New Zealand assisted greatly in the development of Madeline as a driver. In round 1 of the 2017 Rotax Pro-tour, Stewart took her maiden heat victory and her first podium. In round two of the series, Stewart went one better becoming the first female in the 17-year history of the Pro-Tour to win a round taking the 2017 South Australian State Title at the same time.

=== KZ2 ===
Towards the end of 2016, Stewart had her first taste of the ultimate in go-karting, the KZ2 kart competing in the final round of the 2016 Australian Kart Championship (AKC) before taking on the 2016 CIF FIA Asia Pacific Championship at Macau. She completed a full season of the Australian Kart Championship in 2017 with her best round finish of tenth in Emerald. In 2018, she added the New Zealand Pro-kart series to her KZ2 programme with a second-place at the 2018 Kart Sport New Zealand Nationals.

Stewart is also a two-time visitor to the US Supernationals in Las Vegas having competed in KZ2 in 2017 and 2018

== Car racing career ==
Stewart began her car racing career in 2019 stepping straight from go-karts to the third tier Supercar series Super3 Series with Brad Jones Racing To accelerate her learning she also raced in the Western Australian Formula 1000 State Championship.

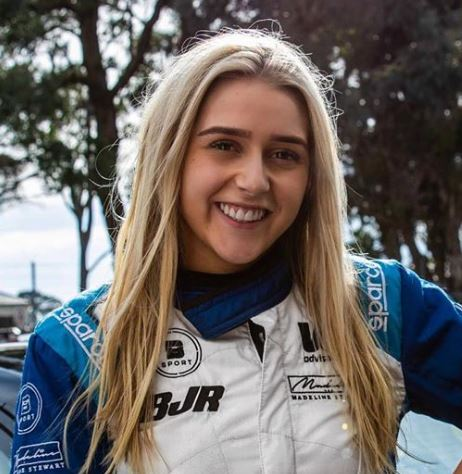
Stewart at a race track in 2019.

Stewart intended to continue to race in the Super3 Series in 2020, with Brad Jones Racing as well as planning to race a Porsche 911 GT3 Cup Car in the Thailand Super Series with Earl Bamber Motorsport. The global COVID-19 pandemic changed those plans. Stewart completed in round 1 of the Super3 Series at Sydney Motorsport Park finishing third. She later competed in two rounds of the Aussie Tin Tops, a series created to give people an opportunity to race during the pandemic. Stewart won the Super3 class at Townsville before swapping to a Porsche 911 GT3 Cup Car with McElrea Racing for round 2 at The Bend Motorsport Park where she finished 4th in the Super Stuttgart class.

In 2021,Stewart became one of the inaugural Porsche New Zealand Scholarship recipients. The scholarship provides partial funding for her to race in the Porsche Sprint Challenge Australia in 2021 with Earl Bamber Motorsport/Porsche Team New Zealand.

Stewart then made the shift over to racing in the USA for the 2023 Porsche Sprint Challenge North America series. She started her US campaign with a pole position and two podiums at the first round at Sebring. From there, she collected podiums at Barber Motorsports Park, Mid-Ohio Sportscar Course and Circuit of the Americas. She finished the series 3rd overall.

Stewart has continued her journey with JDX Racing in 2024, making the move up into Porsche Carrera Cup North America. After a tough start to the season, Madeline recorded her first top 10 of the year at Road America.

In 2024, Porsche Motorsport North America and Mobil 1 announced Stewart as a part of their Female Driver Development Programme which aims to help female racing drivers hone their skills and pursue their dreams of becoming professionals in the sport.

Stewart returned to JDX Racing for the 2025 Porsche Carrera Cup North America season, continuing her development within Porsche’s professional racing ladder.

=== Sports car racing programme ===
In late 2025, Stewart signed a multi-year agreement with Czabok-Simpson Motorsport to compete in the IMSA Michelin Pilot Challenge in the GS class , driving a Porsche Cayman GT4 RS Clubsport. The programme is intended as a progression toward future competition in the IMSA WeatherTech SportsCar Championship.

== Racing record ==
=== Career summary ===
Season	Series	Team	Races	Wins	Poles	F/Laps	Podiums	Points	Position
2019	CAMS WA AUS F1000 State Championship	Arise Racing	15	0	0	0	1	288	4th
2019	Super3 Series	Brad Jones Racing	15	0	0	0	0	124	14th
2020	Townsville Tin Tops - Super3	Brad Jones Racing	3	0	0	0	3	125	1st
2020	The Bend Super Tin Tops - Super Cup	McElrea Racing	3	0	0	0	0	110	5th
2021	Porsche Sprint Challenge Australia - Pro	Earl Bamber Motorsport	5	0	0	0	0	?	?
2021	Porsche Carrera Cup Australia - Pro	Earl Bamber Motorsport	4	0	0	0	0	?	?
2022	GT World Challenge Australia - GT4	Grifcorp Racing	2	0	0	0	2	0	NC†
2022	Porsche Sprint Challenge Australia - Pro	Earl Bamber Motorsport	12	0	0	0	1	365	8th
2023	Porsche Sprint Challenge North America - 992 Pro/Am	JDX Racing	14	0	1	0	5	633	3rd
2024	Porsche Carrera Cup North America	JDX Racing	16	0	0	0	0	31	15th
2024	992 Endurance Cup	MRS-GT Racing	1	0	0	0	0	N/A	28th
2025	Porsche Carrera Cup North America	JDX Racing	14	0	0	0	0	28	16th
2026	Michelin Pilot Challenge - GS	Czabok-Simpson Motorsport							

==== Super3 results ====
Season	No.	Class	PHI (Victoria (state))			WIN (Victoria (state))			QUE (Queensland)			BEN (South Australia)			SAN (Victoria (state))			Pen.	Points	Pos.
2019	8	C	18	19	16	15	Ret	8	Ret	14	9	11	11	10	14	Ret	14		124	14th

==== Porsche Sprint Challenge North America results ====
Season	No.	Class	SEB		BAR		VIR		MIO		ROA		COTA		IMS		Points	Pos.
2023	282	PRO	3	3	4	3	4	4	3	4	5	4	3	3	7	4	633	3rd
