= 2022 GT World Challenge Australia =

Car racing series

The 2022 Fanatec GT World Challenge Australia Powered by AWS was an Australian motor sport competition for GT cars. The series incorporated the "Motorsport Australia GT Championship", the "Motorsport Australia Endurance Championship", the "GT3 Trophy Series", the "GT4 Cup" and the "Invitational Cup". The Motorsport Australia GT Championship was the 26th running of an Australian GT Championship. This was the second season of the championship being jointly managed by Australian Racing Group (ARG) and SRO Motorsports Group.

== Calendar ==
The provisional six-race calendar was released on 1 March 2022 with all rounds taking place in Australia. The season began on 18 March at Phillip Island Grand Prix Circuit and ended on 4 December at the Adelaide Street Circuit in Adelaide. In August, it was announced that Adelaide would join the calendar as the final round, replacing the cancelled May round at Sydney Motorsport Park.

The season ended up consisting of 5 Sprint Cup rounds, and 2 Endurance Cup rounds, both of which took place at Mount Panorama Circuit in Bathurst. The first of these rounds was the 2022 Bathurst 12 Hour which counted towards Endurance Cup points.

Rd	Circuit	City / State	Date	Map
1	(Victoria (state)) Phillip Island Grand Prix Circuit	Phillip Island, Victoria	18–20 March	2022 GT World Challenge Australia is located in Australia
2	Queensland Raceway	Ipswich, Queensland	5–7 August	2022 GT World Challenge Australia is located in Australia
3	(Queensland) Sandown Raceway	Melbourne, Victoria	16–18 September	2022 GT World Challenge Australia is located in Australia
4	(South Australia) The Bend Motorsport Park	Tailem Bend, South Australia	21–23 October	2022 GT World Challenge Australia is located in Australia
5	(South Australia) Adelaide Street Circuit	Adelaide, South Australia	1–4 December	2022 GT World Challenge Australia is located in Australia
Enduro 1	(New South Wales) Mount Panorama Circuit	Bathurst, New South Wales	13–15 May	2022 GT World Challenge Australia is located in Australia
Enduro 2	(New South Wales) Mount Panorama Circuit	Bathurst, New South Wales	11–13 November	2022 GT World Challenge Australia is located in Australia

== Entry list ==
=== Sprint Cup ===
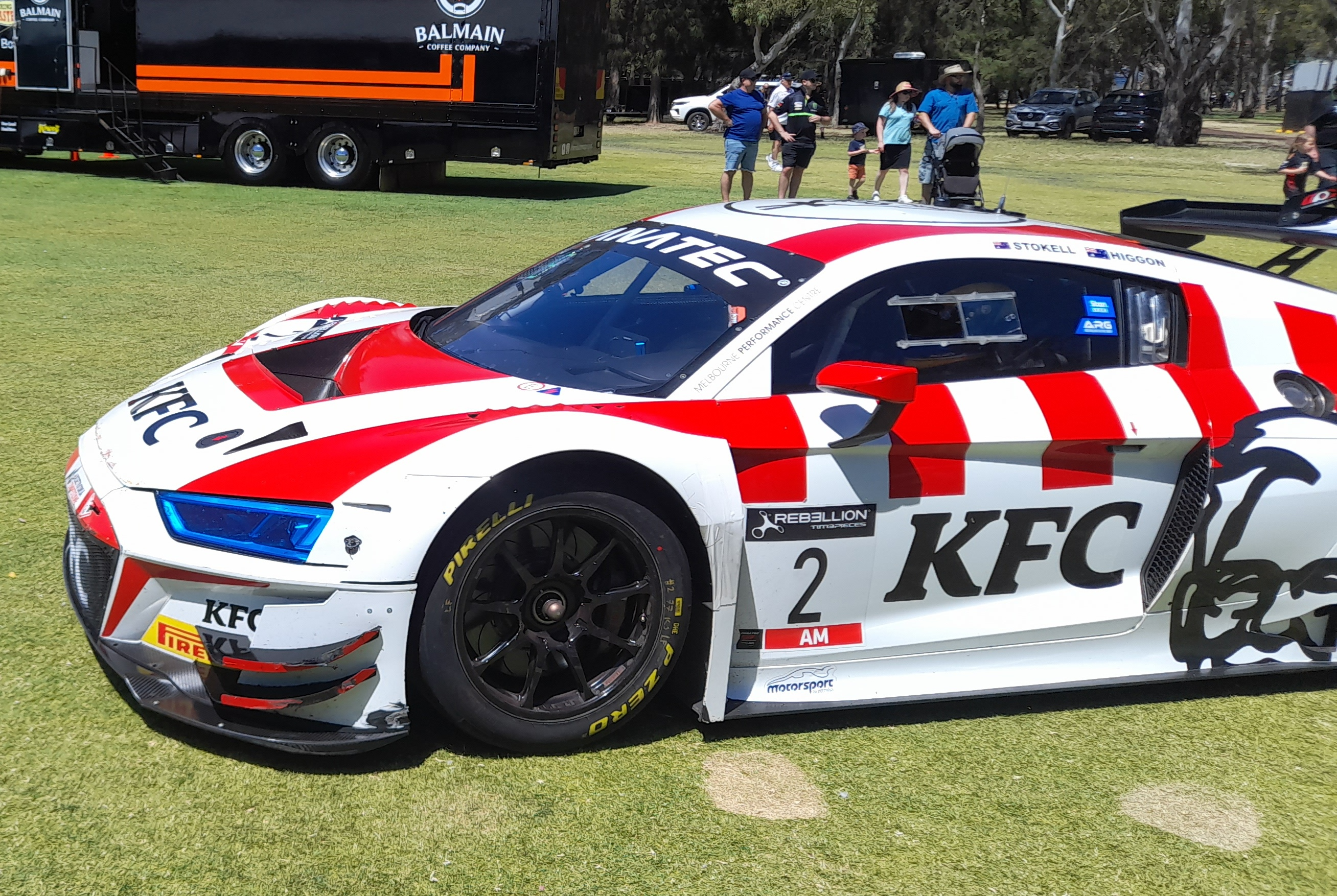
Garry Higgon & Paul Stokell won the Am award driving an Audi R8 LMS Evo

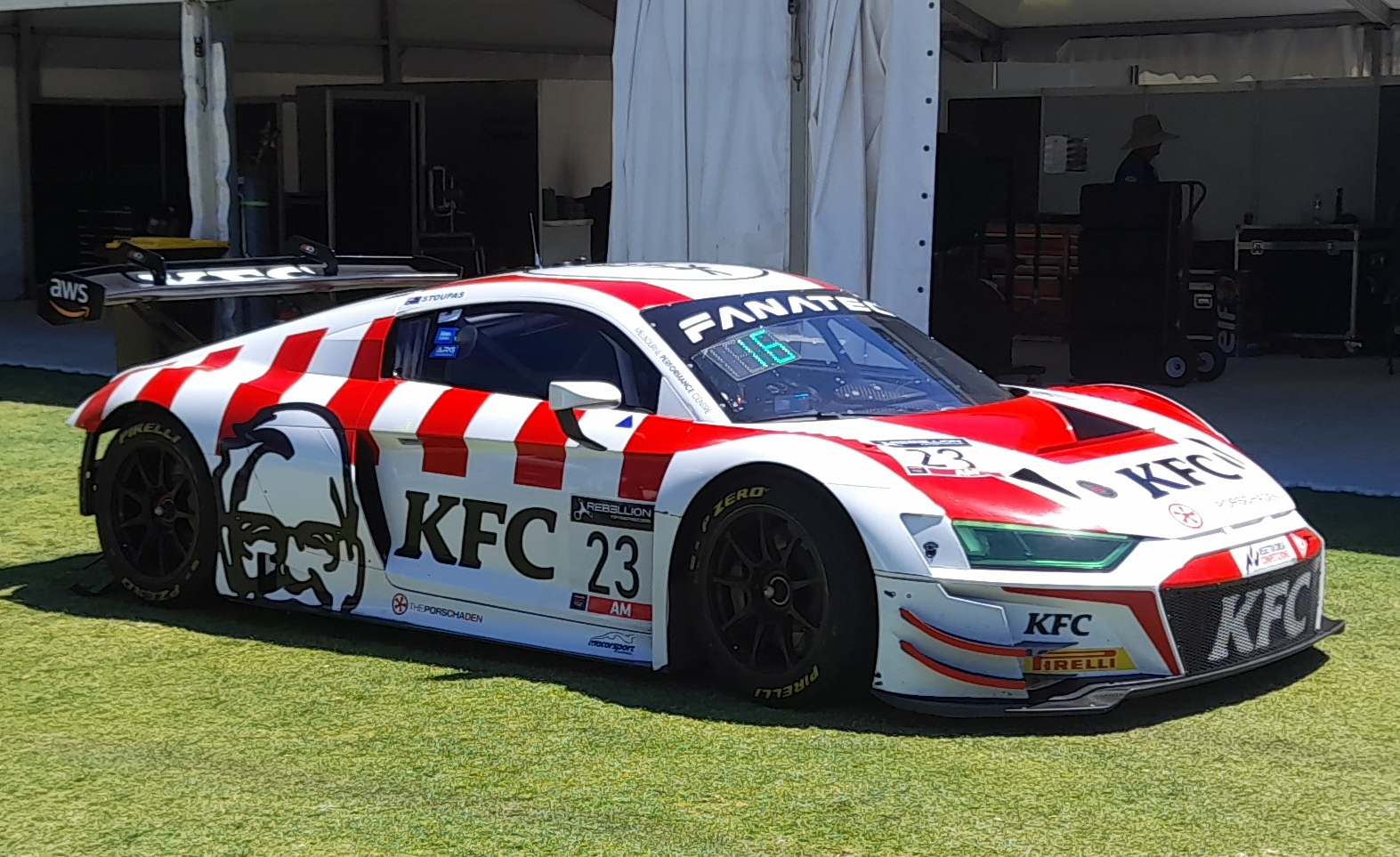
Matt Stoupas placed third in the Am class driving an Audi R8 LMS Evo

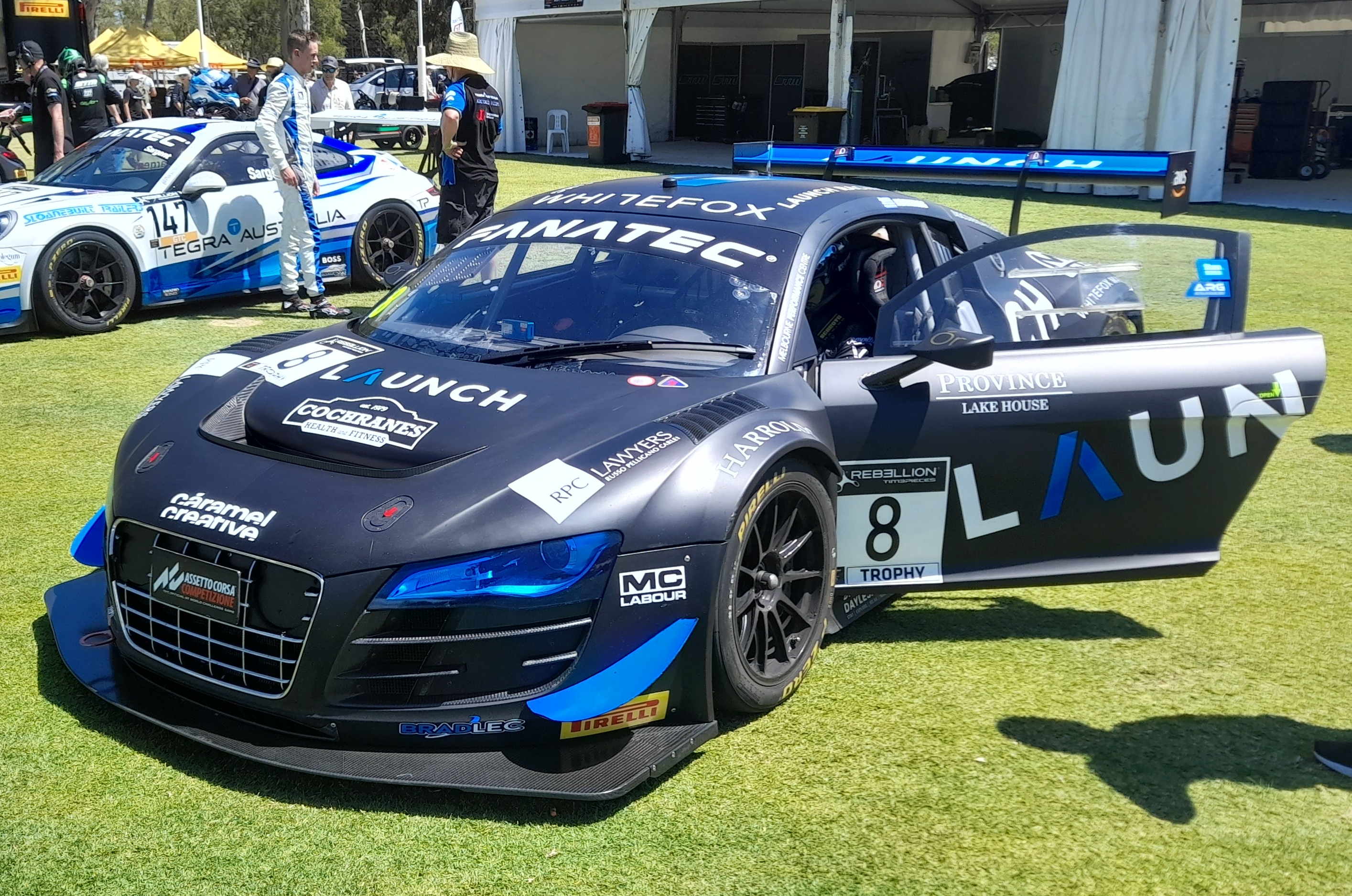
Michael Kokkinos won the GT Trophy award driving an Audi R8 LMS Ultra

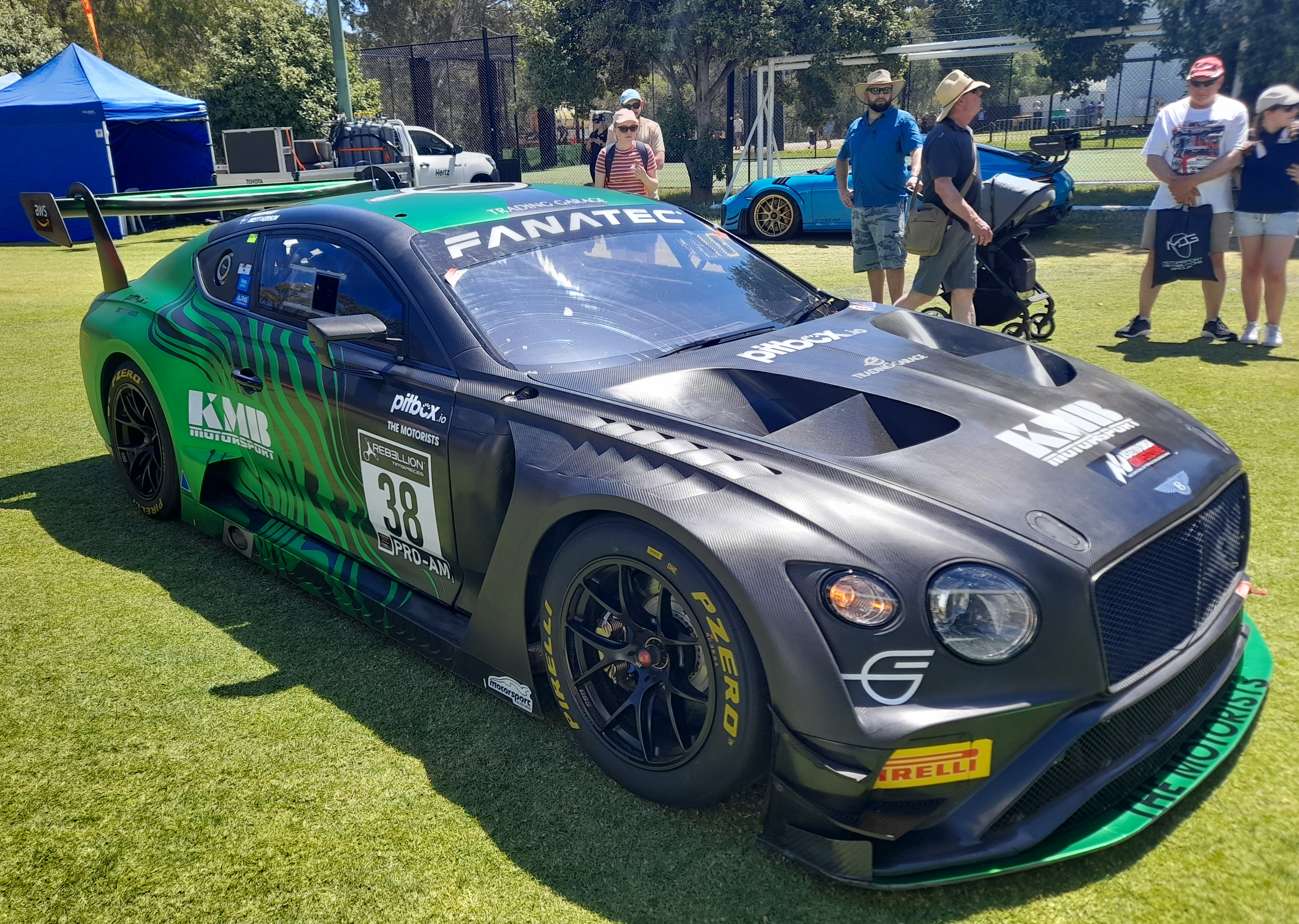
Michael Bailey placed eighth in GT Trophy driving a Bentley Continental GT3

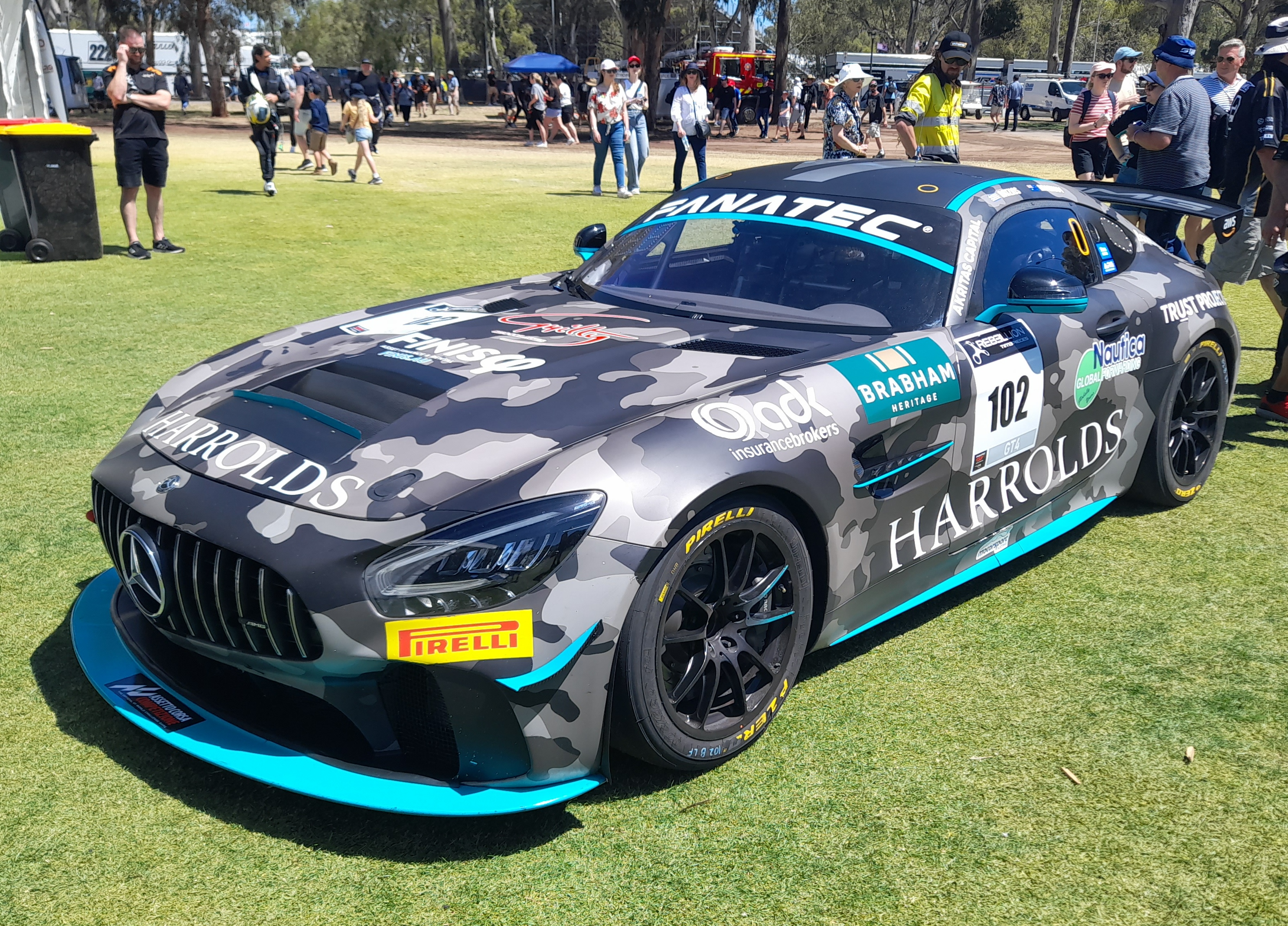
Sam Brabham placed second in the GT4 class driving a Mercedes-AMG GT4

Team	Car	Engine	No.	Drivers	Class	Rounds
GT3
(Australia) Melbourne Performance Centre (Note: Car No. 1 entered as The Bend Motorsport Park, No. 2 and No. 23 as KFC Racing, No. 8 as Launch Racing, No. 9 as Hallmarc, No. 20 as Gtechniq, No. 22 as Melbourne Performance Centre, No. 24 as C-Tech Laser Racing, No. 33 as Perfect Auto Body, and No. 47 as Supabarn Motorsport.)	Audi R8 LMS Evo II	Audi 5.2 L V10	1	(Australia) Yasser Shahin	PA	All
(Australia) Melbourne Performance Centre	Audi R8 LMS Evo II	Audi 5.2 L V10	1	(Germany) Christopher Mies	PA	1, 5
(Australia) Melbourne Performance Centre	Audi R8 LMS Evo II	Audi 5.2 L V10	1	(Australia) Garth Tander	PA	2–4
(Australia) Melbourne Performance Centre	Audi R8 LMS Evo II	Audi 5.2 L V10	2	(Australia) Gary Higgon	Am	All
(Australia) Melbourne Performance Centre	Audi R8 LMS Evo II	Audi 5.2 L V10	2	(Australia) Paul Stokell	Am	All
(Australia) Melbourne Performance Centre	Audi R8 LMS Ultra	Audi 5.2 L V10	8	(Australia) Michael Kokkinos	T	2, 4-5
(Australia) Melbourne Performance Centre	Audi R8 LMS Evo II	Audi 5.2 L V10	9	(Australia) Marc Cini	Am	3, 5
(Australia) Melbourne Performance Centre	Audi R8 LMS Evo II	Audi 5.2 L V10	20 (Note: Ran as #65 in Round 1.)	(Australia) Liam Talbot	PA	All
(Australia) Melbourne Performance Centre	Audi R8 LMS Evo II	Audi 5.2 L V10	20	(Australia) Chaz Mostert	PA	1
(Australia) Melbourne Performance Centre	Audi R8 LMS Evo II	Audi 5.2 L V10	20	(Australia) Fraser Ross	PA	2–5
(Australia) Melbourne Performance Centre	Audi R8 LMS Evo II	Audi 5.2 L V10	22	(Australia) Ash Samadi	Am	5
(Australia) Melbourne Performance Centre	Audi R8 LMS Evo II	Audi 5.2 L V10	23	(Australia) Matt Soupas	Am	All
(Australia) Melbourne Performance Centre	Audi R8 LMS Evo II	Audi 5.2 L V10	24	(Australia) Tony Bates	PA	1–3, 5
(Australia) Melbourne Performance Centre	Audi R8 LMS Evo II	Audi 5.2 L V10	24	(Australia) David Reynolds	PA	1-3
(Australia) Melbourne Performance Centre	Audi R8 LMS Evo II	Audi 5.2 L V10	24	(South Africa) Kelvin van der Linde	PA	5
(Australia) Melbourne Performance Centre	Mercedes-AMG GT3	Mercedes-AMG M159 6.2 L V8	33	(Australia) Vince Muriti	T	1
(Australia) Melbourne Performance Centre	Audi R8 LMS Evo II	Audi 5.2 L V10	47	(Australia) James Koundouris	Am	1-2, 5
(Australia) Melbourne Performance Centre	Audi R8 LMS Evo II	Audi 5.2 L V10	47	(Australia) Theo Koundouris	Am	1-2, 5
(Australia) Grove Racing	Porsche 911 GT3 R	Porsche 4.0 L Flat-6	4	(Australia) Brenton Grove	PA	1
(Australia) Grove Racing	Porsche 911 GT3 R	Porsche 4.0 L Flat-6	4	(Australia) Stephen Grove	PA	1
(Australia) Wall Racing	Lamborghini Huracán GT3 Evo	Lamborghini 5.2 L V10	6	(Australia) Tony D'Alberto	PA	1, 4
(Australia) Wall Racing	Lamborghini Huracán GT3 Evo	Lamborghini 5.2 L V10	6	(Australia) Adrian Deitz	PA	1, 4
(Australia) KMB Motorsport	Bentley Continental GT3 (2016)	Bentley 4.0L Turbo V8	14	(Australia) Matthew Belford	T	5
(Australia) KMB Motorsport	Bentley Continental GT3 (2016)	Bentley 4.0L Turbo V8	38	(Australia) Michael Bailey	T1; PA 5	1, 5
(Australia) KMB Motorsport	Bentley Continental GT3 (2016)	Bentley 4.0L Turbo V8	38	(Australia) Brett Hobson	T1; PA 5	5
(Australia) Team BRM	Audi R8 LMS Evo II	Audi 5.2 L V10	17	(Australia) Mark Rosser	Am	1–2
(Australia) Tigani Motorsport (Note: Entered as Valmont Racing.)	Mercedes-AMG GT3	Mercedes-AMG M159 6.2 L V8	44	(Australia) Marcel Zalloua	T	4
(Australia) Tigani Motorsport	Mercedes-AMG GT3	Mercedes-AMG M159 6.2 L V8	44	(Australia) Sergio Pires	T	4
GWR Australia/RAM Motorsport (Note: Car No. 45 entered as RAM Motorsport, No. 96 as Hobson Motorsport.)	Mercedes-AMG GT3 Evo	Mercedes-AMG M159 6.2 L V8	45	(Australia) Michael Sheargold	Am	1, 3-5
GWR Australia/RAM Motorsport	Mercedes-AMG GT3 Evo	Mercedes-AMG M159 6.2 L V8	45	(Australia) Garth Walden	Am	1, 3-5
GWR Australia/RAM Motorsport	Nissan GT-R Nismo GT3 (2015)	Nissan VR38DETT 3.8L Turbo V6	96	(Australia) Brett Hobson	T	1
(Australia) AMAC Motorsport	Lamborghini Huracán GT3 Evo	Lamborghini 5.2 L V10	51	(Australia) Andrew Macpherson	Am	1
(Australia) AMAC Motorsport	Lamborghini Huracán GT3 Evo	Lamborghini 5.2 L V10	51	(Australia) Ben Porter	Am	1
(Australia) Schumacher Motorsport	Audi R8 LMS (2015)	Audi 5.2 L V10	55	(Australia) Brad Schumacher	T	1–2, 5
(Australia) Schumacher Motorsport	Audi R8 LMS (2015)	Audi 5.2 L V10	55	(Australia) Sergio Pires	T	5
(Australia) Equity-One	Porsche 911 GT3 R (997)	Porsche 4.0 L Flat-6	71	(Australia) Dean Koutsoumidis	T	1
(Malaysia) JMR Triple Eight Race Engineering	Mercedes-AMG GT3 Evo	Mercedes-AMG M159 6.2 L V8	88	(Malaysia) Prince Abu Bakar Ibrahim	PA	4-5
(Malaysia) JMR Triple Eight Race Engineering	Mercedes-AMG GT3 Evo	Mercedes-AMG M159 6.2 L V8	88	(Australia) Jamie Whincup	PA	4-5
(Malaysia) JMR Triple Eight Race Engineering	Mercedes-AMG GT3 Evo	Mercedes-AMG M159 6.2 L V8	888	(Malaysia) Prince Jefri Ibrahim	PA	All
(Malaysia) JMR Triple Eight Race Engineering	Mercedes-AMG GT3 Evo	Mercedes-AMG M159 6.2 L V8	888	(New Zealand) Shane van Gisbergen	PA	1–3
(Malaysia) JMR Triple Eight Race Engineering	Mercedes-AMG GT3 Evo	Mercedes-AMG M159 6.2 L V8	888	(Australia) Broc Feeney	PA	4
(Malaysia) JMR Triple Eight Race Engineering	Mercedes-AMG GT3 Evo	Mercedes-AMG M159 6.2 L V8	888	(Australia) Nick Foster	PA	5
(Australia) Harrolds Volante Rosso	Mercedes-AMG GT3 Evo	Mercedes-AMG M159 6.2 L V8	101	(Australia) Ross Poulakis	Am 3-5; PA 2	2–5
(Australia) Harrolds Volante Rosso	Mercedes-AMG GT3 Evo	Mercedes-AMG M159 6.2 L V8	101	(Australia) Peter Hackett	Am 3-5; PA 2	2
(Australia) Scott Taylor Motorsport	Porsche 911 GT3 R	Porsche 4.0 L Flat-6	222	(Australia) Scott Taylor	T	2, 5
GTC
(Australia) Melbourne Performance Centre (Note: Entered as OK Communication.)	Porsche 991 GT3 II Cup	Porsche 4.0 L Flat-6	11	(Australia) Eric Constantinidis	T	1
Tegra Australia	Porsche 991 GT3 II Cup	Porsche 4.0 L Flat-6	147	(Australia) Tom Sargent	T	5
GT4
(Australia) Nineteen Motorsport	Mercedes-AMG GT4	Mercedes-AMG M178 4.0 L V8	19	(Australia) Mark Griffith	GT4	1, 3-5
(Australia) Nineteen Motorsport	Mercedes-AMG GT4	Mercedes-AMG M178 4.0 L V8	19	(Australia) Declan Fraser	GT4	3
(Australia) Nineteen Motorsport	Mercedes-AMG GT4	Mercedes-AMG M178 4.0 L V8	19	(Australia) Nash Morris	GT4	4
(Australia) Nineteen Motorsport	Mercedes-AMG GT4	Mercedes-AMG M178 4.0 L V8	19	(Australia) Paul Morris	GT4	5
(Australia) Grifcorp Racing	Ginetta G56 GT4	GM LS3 6.2 L V8	22	(New Zealand) Madeline Stewart	GT4	1
(Australia) Harrolds Volante Rosso	Mercedes-AMG GT4	Mercedes-AMG M178 4.0 L V8	102 (Note: Ran as #34 in Round 1.)	(Australia) Sam Brabham	GT4	1, 3-5
(Australia) Harrolds Volante Rosso	Mercedes-AMG GT4	Mercedes-AMG M178 4.0 L V8	102	(Australia) Ross Poulakis	GT4	1
(Australia) Harrolds Volante Rosso	Mercedes-AMG GT4	Mercedes-AMG M178 4.0 L V8	102	(Australia) Christos Batzios	GT4	3-5
Invitational
(Australia) M Motorsport	KTM X-Bow GT2	2.5 L Audi TFSI I5	50	(Australia) David Crampton	INV	3
(Australia) M Motorsport	KTM X-Bow GT2	2.5 L Audi TFSI I5	50	(Australia) Trent Harrison	INV	3

Icon	Class
PA	Pro-Am Cup
Am	Am Cup
T	Trophy Cup
GT4	GT4 Cup
INV	Invitational Cup

=== Endurance Cup ===
Team	Car	Engine	No.	Drivers	Class	Rounds
GT3
(Australia) Melbourne Performance Centre (Note: Car No. 4 entered as SCT/Miles Advisory, No. 9 as Hallmarc, and No. 47 as Supabarn Motorsport.)	Audi R8 LMS Evo II	Audi 5.2 L V10	4	(Australia) Jack Smith	PA	2
(Australia) Melbourne Performance Centre	Audi R8 LMS Evo II	Audi 5.2 L V10	4	(New Zealand) Tim Miles	PA	2
(Australia) Melbourne Performance Centre	Audi R8 LMS Evo II	Audi 5.2 L V10	9	(Australia) Marc Cini	PA	All
(Australia) Melbourne Performance Centre	Audi R8 LMS Evo II	Audi 5.2 L V10	9	(Australia) Michael Caruso	PA	2
(Australia) Melbourne Performance Centre	Audi R8 LMS Evo II	Audi 5.2 L V10	47	(Australia) James Koundouris	Am	All
(Australia) Melbourne Performance Centre	Audi R8 LMS Evo II	Audi 5.2 L V10	47	(Australia) Theo Koundouris	Am	All
(Australia) Wall Racing	Lamborghini Huracán GT3 Evo	Lamborghini 5.2 L V10	6	(Australia) Tony D'Alberto	PA	All
(Australia) Wall Racing	Lamborghini Huracán GT3 Evo	Lamborghini 5.2 L V10	6	(Australia) Adrian Deitz	PA	All
(Australia) Valmont Racing	Mercedes-AMG GT3	Mercedes-AMG M159 6.2 L V8	44	(Australia) Marcel Zalloua	Am 1 TPH2	1
(Australia) Valmont Racing	Mercedes-AMG GT3	Mercedes-AMG M159 6.2 L V8	44	(Australia) Sergio Pires	Am 1 TPH2	1
(Australia) Tigani Motorsport	Mercedes-AMG GT3	Mercedes-AMG M159 6.2 L V8	44	(Australia) Marcel Zalloua	Am 1 TPH2	2
(Australia) Tigani Motorsport	Mercedes-AMG GT3	Mercedes-AMG M159 6.2 L V8	44	(Australia) Sergio Pires	Am 1 TPH2	2
GWR Australia/RAM Motorsport	Mercedes-AMG GT3 Evo	Mercedes-AMG M159 6.2 L V8	45	(Australia) Michael Sheargold	Am	All
GWR Australia/RAM Motorsport	Mercedes-AMG GT3 Evo	Mercedes-AMG M159 6.2 L V8	45	(Australia) Garth Walden	Am	All
(Australia) Schumacher Motorsport	Audi R8 LMS Evo II	Audi 5.2 L V10	55	(Australia) Tim Slade	PA	2
(Australia) Schumacher Motorsport	Audi R8 LMS Evo II	Audi 5.2 L V10	55	(Australia) Brad Schumacher	PA	2
(Australia) Audi Sport Team Valvoline	Audi R8 LMS Evo II	Audi 5.2 L V10	74	(Australia) Brad Schumacher	PA	1
(Malaysia) JMR Triple Eight Race Engineering	Mercedes-AMG GT3 Evo	Mercedes-AMG M159 6.2 L V8	88	(Malaysia) Prince Abu Bakar Ibrahim	PA	2
(Malaysia) JMR Triple Eight Race Engineering	Mercedes-AMG GT3 Evo	Mercedes-AMG M159 6.2 L V8	88	(Australia) Jamie Whincup	PA	2
(Malaysia) JMR Triple Eight Race Engineering	Mercedes-AMG GT3 Evo	Mercedes-AMG M159 6.2 L V8	888	(Malaysia) Prince Jefri Ibrahim	PA	All
(Malaysia) JMR Triple Eight Race Engineering	Mercedes-AMG GT3 Evo	Mercedes-AMG M159 6.2 L V8	888	(Australia) Broc Feeney	PA	All
(Australia) Harrolds Volante Rosso	Mercedes-AMG GT3 Evo	Mercedes-AMG M159 6.2 L V8	101	(Australia) Ross Poulakis	PA	2
(Australia) Harrolds Volante Rosso	Mercedes-AMG GT3 Evo	Mercedes-AMG M159 6.2 L V8	101	(Australia) Jordan Love	PA	2
GT4
(Australia) Nineteen Motorsport	Mercedes-AMG GT4	Mercedes-AMG M178 4.0 L V8	19	(Australia) Mark Griffith	GT4	2
(Australia) Nineteen Motorsport	Mercedes-AMG GT4	Mercedes-AMG M178 4.0 L V8	19	(Australia) Nash Morris	GT4	2
(Australia) Harrolds Volante Rosso	Mercedes-AMG GT4	Mercedes-AMG M178 4.0 L V8	102	(Australia) Sam Brabham	GT4	2
(Australia) Harrolds Volante Rosso	Mercedes-AMG GT4	Mercedes-AMG M178 4.0 L V8	102	(Australia) Ross Poulakis	GT4	2
Invitational
(Australia) M Motorsport	KTM X-Bow GT2	2.5 L Audi TFSI I5	50	(Australia) David Crampton	INV	All
(Australia) M Motorsport	KTM X-Bow GT2	2.5 L Audi TFSI I5	50	(Australia) Trent Harrison	INV	All

Icon	Class
PA	Pro-Am Cup
Am	Am Cup
T	Trophy Cup
GT4	GT4 Cup
INV	Invitational Cup

== Race results ==
Bold indicates the overall winner.

Round		Circuit	Pole position	Pro-Am winners	Am winners	Trophy winners	GT4 winners	Invitational winners
1	R1	(Victoria (state)) Phillip Island	No. 96 GWR Australia/RAM Motorsport	(Australia) **No. 65 Melbourne Performance Centre**	(Australia) No. 2 Melbourne Performance Centre	(Australia) No. 55 Schumacher Motorsport	(Australia) No. 34 Harrolds Volante Rosso	No Invitational Entries
1	R1	(Victoria (state)) Phillip Island	(Australia) Brett Hobson	(Australia) **Chaz Mostert** **(Australia) Liam Talbot**	(Australia) Gary Higgon (Australia) Paul Stokel	(Australia) Brad Schumacher	(Australia) Sam Brabham (Australia) Ross Poulakis	No Invitational Entries
1	R2	(Victoria (state)) Phillip Island	(Australia) No. 65 Melbourne Performance Centre	(Australia) **No. 1 Melbourne Performance Centre**	(Australia) No. 23 Melbourne Performance Centre	(Australia) No. 55 Schumacher Motorsport	(Australia) No. 34 Harrolds Volante Rosso	No Invitational Entries
1	R2	(Victoria (state)) Phillip Island	(Australia) Chaz Mostert (Australia) Liam Talbot	(Germany) **Christopher Mies** **(Australia) Yasser Shahin**	(Australia) Matt Soupas	(Australia) Brad Schumacher	(Australia) Sam Brabham (Australia) Ross Poulakis	No Invitational Entries
2	R1	Queensland	(Australia) No. 1 Melbourne Performance Centre	(Malaysia) **No. 888 JMR Triple Eight Race Engineering**	(Australia) No. 17 Team BRM	(Australia) No. 55 Schumacher Motorsport	No GT4 Entries	No Invitational Entries
2	R1	Queensland	(Australia) Garth Tander (Australia) Yasser Shahin	(New Zealand) **Shane van Gisbergen** **(Malaysia) Prince Jefri Ibrahim**	(Australia) Mark Rosser	(Australia) Brad Schumacher	No GT4 Entries	No Invitational Entries
2	R2	Queensland	(Australia) No. 1 Melbourne Performance Centre	(Australia) **No. 1 Melbourne Performance Centre**	(Australia) No. 17 Team BRM	(Australia) No. 222 Scott Taylor Motorsport	No GT4 Entries	No Invitational Entries
2	R2	Queensland	(Australia) Garth Tander (Australia) Yasser Shahin	(Australia) **Garth Tander** **(Australia) Yasser Shahin**	(Australia) Mark Rosser	(Australia) Scott Taylor	No GT4 Entries	No Invitational Entries
3	R1	(Victoria (state)) Sandown	(Australia) No. 1 Melbourne Performance Centre	(Malaysia) **No. 888 JMR Triple Eight Race Engineering**	(Australia) No. 101 Harrolds Volante Rosso	No Trophy Entries	(Australia) No. 102 Harrolds Volante Rosso	(Australia) No. 50 M Motorsport
3	R1	(Victoria (state)) Sandown	(Australia) Garth Tander (Australia) Yasser Shahin	(New Zealand) **Shane van Gisbergen** **(Malaysia) Prince Jefri Ibrahim**	(Australia) Ross Poulakis	No Trophy Entries	(Australia) Christos Batzios (Australia) Sam Brabham	(Australia) David Crampton (Australia) Trent Harrison
3	R2	(Victoria (state)) Sandown	(Malaysia) No. 888 JMR Triple Eight Race Engineering	(Australia) **No. 1 Melbourne Performance Centre**	(Australia) No. 23 Melbourne Performance Centre	No Trophy Entries	(Australia) No. 19 Nineteen Motorsport	(Australia) No. 50 M Motorsport
3	R2	(Victoria (state)) Sandown	(New Zealand) Shane van Gisbergen (Malaysia) Prince Jefri Ibrahim	(Australia) **Garth Tander** **(Australia) Yasser Shahin**	(Australia) Matt Stoupas	No Trophy Entries	(Australia) Declan Fraser	(Australia) David Crampton (Australia) Trent Harrison
4	R1	(South Australia) The Bend	(Malaysia) No. 888 JMR Triple Eight Race Engineering	(Malaysia) **No. 888 JMR Triple Eight Race Engineering**	(Australia) No. 101 Harrolds Volante Rosso	(Australia) No. 44 Tigani Motorsport	(Australia) No. 19 Nineteen Motorsport	No Invitational Entries
4	R1	(South Australia) The Bend	(Australia) Broc Feeney (Malaysia) Prince Jefri Ibrahim	(New Zealand) **Shane van Gisbergen** **(Malaysia) Prince Jefri Ibrahim**	(Australia) Ross Poulakis	(Australia) Sergio Pires (Australia) Marcel Zalloua	(Australia) Mark Griffith (Australia) Nash Morris	No Invitational Entries
4	R2	(South Australia) The Bend	(Malaysia) No. 888 JMR Triple Eight Race Engineering	Race Cancelled				No Invitational Entries
4	R2	(South Australia) The Bend	(Australia) Broc Feeney (Malaysia) Prince Jefri Ibrahim	Race Cancelled				No Invitational Entries
5	R1	(South Australia) Adelaide	(Australia) No. 65 Melbourne Performance Centre	(Australia) **No. 1 Melbourne Performance Centre**	(Australia) No. 101 Harrolds Volante Rosso	(Australia) No. 55 Schumacher Motorsport	(Australia) No. 102 Harrolds Volante Rosso	No Invitational Entries
5	R1	(South Australia) Adelaide	(Australia) Liam Talbot (Australia) Fraser Ross	(Germany) **Christopher Mies** **(Australia) Yasser Shahin**	(Australia) Ross Poulakis	(Australia) Sergio Pires (Australia) Brad Schumacher	(Australia) Christos Batzios (Australia) Sam Brabham	No Invitational Entries
5	R2	(South Australia) Adelaide	(Australia) No. 24 Melbourne Performance Centre	(Australia) **No. 65 Melbourne Performance Centre**	(Australia) No. 101 Harrolds Volante Rosso	(Australia) No. 8 Melbourne Performance Centre	(Australia) No. 19 Nineteen Motorsport	No Invitational Entries
5	R2	(South Australia) Adelaide	(Australia) Tony Bates (South Africa) Kelvin van der Linde	(Australia) **Liam Talbot** **(Australia) Fraser Ross**	(Australia) Ross Poulakis	(Australia) Michael Kokkinos	(Australia) Mark Griffith (Australia) Paul Morris	No Invitational Entries
5	R3	(South Australia) Adelaide	(Australia) No. 65 Melbourne Performance Centre	(Australia) **No. 1 Melbourne Performance Centre**	No. 45 GWR Australia/RAM Motorsport	(Australia) No. 8 Melbourne Performance Centre	(Australia) No. 102 Harrolds Volante Rosso	No Invitational Entries
5	R3	(South Australia) Adelaide	(Australia) Liam Talbot (Australia) Fraser Ross	(Germany) **Christopher Mies** **(Australia) Yasser Shahin**	(Australia) Michael Sheargold (Australia) Garth Walden	(Australia) Michael Kokkinos	(Australia) Christos Batzios (Australia) Sam Brabham	No Invitational Entries
Enduro 1		(New South Wales) Bathurst	(Australia) No. 74 Audi Sport Team Valvoline	(Malaysia) **No. 888 JMR Triple Eight Race Engineering**	(Australia) No. 47 Melbourne Performance Centre	No Trophy Entries	No GT4 Entries	No Finishers
Enduro 1		(New South Wales) Bathurst	(Australia) Brad Schumacher	(Australia) **Broc Feeney** **(Malaysia) Prince Jefri Ibrahim**	(Australia) James Koundouris (Australia) Theo Koundouris	No Trophy Entries	No GT4 Entries	No Finishers
Enduro 2		(New South Wales) Bathurst	(Australia) No. 55 Schumacher Motorsport	(Malaysia) **No. 888 JMR Triple Eight Race Engineering**	No. 45 GWR Australia/RAM Motorsport	(Australia) No. 44 Tigani Motorsport	(Australia) No. 19 Nineteen Motorsport	No Finishers
Enduro 2		(New South Wales) Bathurst	(Australia) Brad Schumacher (Australia) Tim Slade	(Australia) **Broc Feeney** **(Malaysia) Prince Jefri Ibrahim**	(Australia) Michael Sheargold (Australia) Garth Walden	(Australia) Sergio Pires (Australia) Marcel Zalloua	(Australia) Mark Griffith (Australia) Nash Morris	No Finishers

== Championship Standings ==
Scoring system (Sprint Cup Rounds 1-4 and Endurance Cup)

Position	**1st**	**2nd**	**3rd**	**4th**	**5th**	**6th**	**7th**	**8th**	**9th**	**10th**
Points	25	18	15	12	10	8	6	4	2	1

Scoring system (Sprint Cup Round 5)

Position	**1st**	**2nd**	**3rd**	**4th**	**5th**	**6th**	**7th**	**8th**	**9th**	**10th**
Points	17	12	10	8	7	5	4	3	2	1

=== Pro-Am Cup ===
Pos	Driver	Team	PHI (Victoria (state))		QUE (Queensland)		SAN (Victoria (state))		BEN (South Australia)		ADL (South Australia)			Points
1	(Australia) Yasser Shahin	(Australia) Melbourne Performance Centre	2	1	**2**	**1**	**2**	1	4	C	1	4	1	188
2	(Australia) Liam Talbot	(Australia) Melbourne Performance Centre	**1**	**2**	3	2	3	2	2	C	**3**	1	**2**	166
3	(Malaysia) Prince Jefri Ibrahim	(Malaysia) JMR Triple Eight Race Engineering	3	5	1	3	1	**3**	**1**	**C**	WD	WD	WD	130
4	(Australia) Fraser Ross	(Australia) Melbourne Performance Centre			3	2	3	2	2	C	**3**	1	**2**	123
5	(Australia) Tony Bates	(Australia) Melbourne Performance Centre	4	3	4	4	**4**	4			2	**2**	4	109
6	(New Zealand) Shane van Gisbergen	(Malaysia) JMR Triple Eight Race Engineering	3	5	1	**3**	1	3						105
7	(Australia) Garth Tander	(Australia) Melbourne Performance Centre			**2**	**1**	**2**	1	4	C				101
8	(Germany) Christopher Mies	(Australia) Melbourne Performance Centre	2	1							1	4	1	87
9	(Australia) David Reynolds	(Australia) Melbourne Performance Centre	4	3	4	4	4	4						75
10	(Australia) Chaz Mostert	(Australia) Melbourne Performance Centre	**1**	**2**										43
11	(Australia) Tony D'Alberto (Australia) Adrian Deitz	(Australia) Wall Racing	6	6					5	C				28
12	(Australia) Brenton Grove (Australia) Stephen Grove	(Australia) Grove Racing	5	4										22
13	(Australia) Ross Poulakis (Australia) Peter Hackett	(Australia) Harrolds Volante Rosso			5	5								20
Entries ineligible to score points
—	(Australia) Broc Feeney	(Malaysia) JMR Triple Eight Race Engineering							**1**	**C**				0
—	(South Africa) Kelvin van der Linde	(Australia) Melbourne Performance Centre									2	**2**	4	0
—	(Malaysia) Prince Abu Bakar Ibrahim (Australia) Jamie Whincup	(Malaysia) JMR Triple Eight Race Engineering							3	C	Ret	3	3	0
—	(Australia) Michael Bailey (Australia) Brett Hobson	(Australia) KMB Motorsport									Ret	5	5	0
—	(Australia) Nick Foster	(Malaysia) JMR Triple Eight Race Engineering									WD	WD	WD	0
Pos	Driver	Team	PHI (Victoria (state))		QUE (Queensland)		SAN (Victoria (state))		BEN (South Australia)		ADL (South Australia)			Points

Key
Colour	Result
Gold	Race winner
Silver	2nd place
Bronze	3rd place
Green	Points finish
Blue	Non-points finish
Blue	Non-classified finish (NC)
Purple	Did not finish (Ret)
Black	Disqualified (DSQ)
Black	Excluded (EX)
White	Did not start (DNS)
White	Race cancelled (C)
White	Withdrew (WD)
Blank	Did not participate

**Bold** – Pole
Italics – Fastest lap

=== Am Cup ===
Pos	Driver	Team	PHI (Victoria (state))		QUE (Queensland)		SAN (Victoria (state))		BEN (South Australia)		ADL (South Australia)			Points
1	(Australia) Gary Higgon (Australia) Paul Stokell	(Australia) Melbourne Performance Centre	1	**6**	2	**1**	2	3	3	C	2	Ret	2	161
2	(Australia) Michael Sheargold (Australia) Garth Walden	GWR Australia/RAM Motorsport	2	2			4	**5**	2	**C**	6	**3**	1	126
3	(Australia) Matt Stoupas	(Australia) Melbourne Performance Centre	**3**	1	**Ret**	Ret	Ret	1	**4**	C	Ret	6	Ret	85
4	(Australia) Mark Rosser	(Australia) Team BRM	Ret	3	1	2								58
5	(Australia) James Koundouris (Australia) Theo Koundouris	(Australia) Melbourne Performance Centre	4	5	Ret	Ret					5	2	3	51
6	(Australia) Ben Porter (Australia) Andrew Macpherson	(Australia) AMAC Motorsport	5	4										22
Entries ineligible to score points
—	(Australia) Ross Poulakis	(Australia) Harrolds Volante Rosso					**1**	4	1	C	**1**	1	**Ret**	0
—	(Australia) Marc Cini	(Australia) Melbourne Performance Centre					2	3			3	5	4	0
—	(Australia) Ash Samadi	(Australia) Melbourne Performance Centre									4	4	5	0
Pos	Driver	Team	PHI (Victoria (state))		QUE (Queensland)		SAN (Victoria (state))		BEN (South Australia)		ADL (South Australia)			Points

=== Trophy Cup ===
Pos	Driver	Team	PHI (Victoria (state))		QUE (Queensland)		SAN (Victoria (state))	BEN (South Australia)		ADL (South Australia)			Points
1	(Australia) Michael Kokkinos	(Australia) Melbourne Performance Centre			3	2		**2**	C	3	2	2	92
2	(Australia) Brad Schumacher	(Australia) Schumacher Motorsport	1	**1**	**1**	**Ret**				**1**	Ret	DNS	82 (Note: Brad Schumacher had 10 penalty points deducted from his original total of 92, leaving him with 82 points.)
3	(Australia) Scott Taylor	(Australia) Scott Taylor Motorsport			2	1				4	3	3	71
4	(Australia) Brett Hobson	GWR Australia/RAM Motorsport	**2**	3									33
5	(Australia) Dean Koutsoumidis	(Australia) Equity-One	4	2									30
6	(Australia) Vince Muriti	(Australia) Melbourne Performance Centre	3	5									25
7	(Australia) Michael Bailey	(Australia) KMB Motorsport	5	4									22
8	(Australia) Eric Constantinidis	(Australia) Melbourne Performance Centre	Ret	6									8
Entries ineligible to score points
—	(Australia) Sergio Pires	(Australia) Tigani Motorsport						1	**C**				0
—	(Australia) Sergio Pires	(Australia) Schumacher Motorsport								**1**	Ret	DNS	0
—	(Australia) Marcel Zalloua	(Australia) Tigani Motorsport						1	**C**				0
—	(Australia) Tom Sargent	Tegra Australia								2	1	**1**	0
—	(Australia) Matthew Belford	(Australia) KMB Motorsport								Ret	**Ret**	DNS	0
Pos	Driver	Team	PHI (Victoria (state))		QUE (Queensland)		SAN (Victoria (state))	BEN (South Australia)		ADL (South Australia)			Points

=== GT4 Cup ===
Pos	Driver	Team	PHI (Victoria (state))		QUE (Queensland)	SAN (Victoria (state))		BEN (South Australia)		ADL (South Australia)			Points
1	(Australia) Mark Griffith	(Australia) Nineteen Motorsport	**2**	2		**2**	**1**	**1**	C	**2**	1	2	145
2	(Australia) Sam Brabham	(Australia) Harrolds Volante Rosso	1	**1**		1	Ret	2	**C**	1	**2**	**1**	139
3	(Australia) Ross Poulakis	(Australia) Harrolds Volante Rosso	1	**1**									50
Entries ineligible to score points
—	(Australia) Chris Batzios	(Australia) Harrolds Volante Rosso				1	Ret	2	**C**	1	**2**	**1**	0
—	(Australia) Paul Morris	(Australia) Nineteen Motorsport								**2**	1	2	0
—	(Australia) Declan Fraser	(Australia) Nineteen Motorsport				**2**	**1**						0
—	(Australia) Nash Morris	(Australia) Nineteen Motorsport						**1**	C				0
—	(New Zealand) Madeline Stewart	(Australia) Griffcorp Racing	3	3									0
Pos	Driver	Team	PHI (Victoria (state))		QUE (Queensland)	SAN (Victoria (state))		BEN (South Australia)		ADL (South Australia)			Points

=== Invitational Cup ===
Pos	Driver	Team	PHI (Victoria (state))	QUE (Queensland)	SAN (Victoria (state))		BEN (South Australia)	ADL (South Australia)	Points
1	(Australia) David Crampton (Australia) Trent Harrison	(Australia) M Motorsport			**1**	**1**			50
Pos	Driver	Team	PHI (Victoria (state))	QUE (Queensland)	SAN (Victoria (state))		BEN (South Australia)	ADL (South Australia)	Points

=== Pro-Am Cup ===
Pos	Driver	Team	BAT (New South Wales)	BAT (New South Wales)	Points
1	(Australia) Broc Feeney (Malaysia) Prince Jefri Ibrahim	(Malaysia) JMR Triple Eight Race Engineering	1	1	50
2	(Australia) Brad Schumacher	(Australia) Audi Sport Team Valvoline	**2**		36
2	(Australia) Brad Schumacher	(Australia) Schumacher Motorsport		2	36
3	(Australia) Tony D'Alberto (Australia) Adrian Deitz	(Australia) Wall Racing	3	6	23
4	(Australia) Marc Cini	(Australia) Melbourne Performance Centre	4	5	22
5	(Australia) Tim Slade	(Australia) Schumacher Motorsport		2	18
6	(Australia) Ross Poulakis (Australia) Jordan Love	(Australia) Wall Racing		**3**	15
7	(Australia) Jack Smith (New Zealand) Tim Miles	(Australia) Melbourne Performance Centre		4	12
8	(Australia) Michael Caruso	(Australia) Melbourne Performance Centre		5	10
9	(Malaysia) Prince Abu Bakar Ibrahim (Australia) Jamie Whincup	(Malaysia) JMR Triple Eight Race Engineering		WD	0
Pos	Driver	Team	BAT (New South Wales)	BAT (New South Wales)	Points

=== Am Cup ===
Pos	Driver	Team	BAT (New South Wales)	BAT (New South Wales)	Points
1	(Australia) James Koundouris (Australia) Theo Koundouris	(Australia) Melbourne Performance Centre	1	2	43
2	(Australia) Michael Sheargold (Australia) Garth Walden	GWR Australia/RAM Motorsport	Ret	**1**	25
3	(Australia) Sergio Pires (Australia) Marcel Zalloua	(Australia) Valmont Racing	**Ret**		0
Pos	Driver	Team	BAT (New South Wales)	BAT (New South Wales)	Points

=== Trophy Cup ===
Pos	Driver	Team	BAT (New South Wales)	BAT (New South Wales)	Points
1	(Australia) Sergio Pires (Australia) Marcel Zalloua	(Australia) Tigani Motorsport		**1**	25
Pos	Driver	Team	BAT (New South Wales)	BAT (New South Wales)	Points

=== GT4 Cup ===
Pos	Driver	Team	BAT (New South Wales)	BAT (New South Wales)	Points
1	(Australia) Mark Griffith (Australia) Nash Morris	(Australia) Nineteen Motorsport		**1**	25
2	(Australia) Sam Brabham (Australia) Ross Poulakis	(Australia) Harrolds Volante Rosso		2	18
Pos	Driver	Team	BAT (New South Wales)	BAT (New South Wales)	Points

=== Invitational Cup ===
Pos	Driver	Team	BAT (New South Wales)	BAT (New South Wales)	Points
—	(Australia) David Crampton (Australia) Trent Harrison	(Australia) M Motorsport	**Ret**	**Ret**	0
Pos	Driver	Team	BAT (New South Wales)	BAT (New South Wales)	Points

== See also ==
- 2022 British GT Championship
- 2022 GT World Challenge Europe
- 2022 GT World Challenge Europe Sprint Cup
- 2022 GT World Challenge Europe Endurance Cup
- 2022 GT World Challenge Asia
- 2022 GT World Challenge America
- 2022 Intercontinental GT Challenge
