= Josh Fife =

Australian racing driver

- Nationality: Australian
- Born: Joshua Fife; 1 July 2000 (age 26) Canberra, Australia

S5000 Australian Drivers' Championship career
- Debut season: 2022 S5000 Australian Drivers' Championship
- Current team: 88 Racing
- Car number: 88
- Starts: 3
- Wins: 1
- Podiums: 0
- Poles: 0

Previous series
- 2019 2020–2021: Kumho Tyre Super3 Series; Super2 Series

Joshua Fife (born 1 July 2000) is an Australian racing driver from Canberra, Australia. He last competed in the S5000 Australian Drivers' Championship with 88Racing, driving the No. 88 Onroak-Ligier-Ford.

== Biography ==
Fife began karting at the age of ten, competing in national events around the world. After karting full-time in Italy, he returned to Australia in 2019 and joined the Super3 Series with Brad Jones Racing. In his debut season, he scored two race wins and five podium finishes to finish fifth in the driver's standings. In December 2019 after a test day with Brad Jones Racing at Winton Raceway, Fife was announced to be joining the team in their Super2 program for 2020.

== Racing record ==
=== Karting career summary ===
Season	Series	Position
2014	ROK Cup International Final - Junior ROK	24th
2015	Asia-Pacific Championship - KZ	5th
2015	SKUSA SuperNationals XIX - TaG Junior	26th
2015	Race of Stars - KZ2	11th
2016	45° Trofeo delle Industrie - KZ2	16th
2016	Australian Kart Championship - KZ2	4th
2016	Rotax Max Challenge New Zealand - Senior Light class	19st
2017	Australian Kart Championship - KZ2	1st
2017	SKUSA SuperNationals XXI - KZ class	31st
2017	Race of Stars - KZ2	28th
2017	Rotax Max Challenge Grand Finals - DD2	37th
2017	SKUSA SuperNationals XX1 - S1 Pro	5th
2018	Australian Kart Championship - KZ2	2nd
2018	WSK Master Series - KZ2	24th
2018	SKUSA SuperNationals XXII - KZ class	12th
2018	23° South Garda Winter Cup - KZ2	25th
2018	WSK Champions Cup - KZ2	8th
2021	Australian Kart Championship - KZ2	18th
2022	Australian Kart Championship - KZ2	1st
2023	Australian Kart Championship - KZ2	14th

=== Career summary ===
Season	Series	Team	Races	Wins	Poles	F/laps	Podiums	Points	Position
2019	Super3 Series	Brad Jones Racing	15	2	0	0	5	413	5th
2020	Super2 Series	Brad Jones Racing	7	0	0	0	0	434	10th
2021	Super2 Series	MW Motorsport	9	0	0	0	0	582	10th
2022	S5000 Australia	88Racing	3	1	0	0	2	80	12th

Awards and achievements
Preceded by David Sera	John Pizarro Perpetual Karting Trophy; 2017	Succeeded by Aaron Cameron
Preceded by Troy Loeskow	John Pizarro Perpetual Karting Trophy; 2022	Succeeded by Sam Dicker
