= 2024 992 Endurance Cup =

Endurance sports car race

Race details
Date	6–7 September 2024
Official name	Michelin 992 Endurance Cup powered by Porsche Motorsport
Location	Spa-Francorchamps, Wallonia, Belgium
Course	Permanent circuit 7.004 km (4.352 mi)
Distance	Race; 12 hours
- Qualifying

Pole
Drivers	(Netherlands) Jan Jaap van Roon (Netherlands) Tom Coronel (Netherlands) Paul Meijer (Germany) Benjamin Leuchter	Max Kruse Racing
Time	2:22.456
- Race

Fastest Lap
Driver	(France) Mathys Jaubert	Seblajoux Racing by DUWO Racing
Time	2:21.610

Podium
First	(Netherlands) Loek Hartog (Germany) Christopher Mies (Germany) Tobias Müller (Germany) Noah Nagelsdiek	BLACK FALCON Team 48 LOSCH
Second	(Netherlands) Jan Jaap van Roon (Netherlands) Tom Coronel (Netherlands) Paul Meijer (Germany) Benjamin Leuchter	Max Kruse Racing
Third	(Netherlands) Ivo Breukers (Netherlands) Luc Breukers (Netherlands) Ric Breukers (Switzerland) Fabian Danz	Red Camel-Jordans.nl

The 2024 992 Endurance Cup (known for sponsorship reasons as the Michelin 992 Endurance Cup powered by Porsche Motorsport) was the inaugural edition of the non-championship event held at Circuit de Spa-Francorchamps for Porsche 992 GT3 Cup cars.

== Background ==
The event was announced on 14 December 2023. The race was organized by Creventic with support from Porsche Motorsport and Michelin as the official tire supplier.

== Schedule ==
Date	Time (local: CEST)	Event	Duration
6 September	16:35 - 18:05	Free Practice	90 Minutes
6 September	19:05 - 20:05	Qualifying	3x15 Minutes
6 September	21:05 - 21:50	Night Practice	45 Minutes
7 September	9:45 - 21:45	Race	12 Hours

== Entry list ==
The entry list was revealed on September 5, 2024, and featured 28 Porsche 992 GT3 Cup cars: 7 in Pro, 9 in Pro/Am and 12 in the Am class.

No.	Entrant	Class	Driver 1	Driver 2	Driver 3	Driver 4
4	(Belgium) Mühlner Motorsport	P	(Netherlands) Jeroen Bleekemolen	(Estonia) Martin Rump	(Germany) Fabio Grosse	
5	(Germany) BLACK FALCON	PA	(Turkey) Mustafa Mehmet Kaya	(Germany) Christopher Mies	(Italy) Gabriele Piana	(Germany) Mike Stursberg
8	(Germany) Max Kruse Racing	P	(Netherlands) Jan Jaap van Roon	(Netherlands) Tom Coronel	(Netherlands) Paul Meijer	(Germany) Benjamin Leuchter
9	(Netherlands) Red Camel-Jordans.nl	P	(Netherlands) Ivo Breukers	(Netherlands) Luc Breukers	(Netherlands) Rik Breukers	(Switzerland) Fabian Danz
10	(Germany) Max Kruse Racing	P	(Germany) Marcel Fugel	(Germany) Dominik Fugel	(Germany) Nico Otto	(Germany) Benjamin Leuchter
12	(Netherlands) Team GP-Elite	Am	(Netherlands) Peter Munnichs	(Netherlands) Koen Munnichs	(Netherlands) Wouter Boerekamps	
15	(Belgium) H-2-H Racing	P	(Belgium) Gilles Verleyen	(Belgium) Guillaume Mondron	(Belgium) Mathieu Detry	(Kyrgyzstan) Stanislav Minsky
18	(Belgium) Mühlner Motorsport	PA	(Canada) Parker Thompson	(United States) Jared Thomas	(United States) Anthony McIntosh	(United States) Glenn McGee
21	(Belgium) Mühlner Motorsport	Am	(New Zealand) Ryan Yardley	(United States) Anthony McIntosh	(United States) Glenn McGee	(United States) Tyler Hoffman
29	(Germany) Toro Racing by HRT Performance	PA	(China) Eric Zang	(China) Dennis Zhang	(United Kingdom) Adam Christodoulou	(Germany) Kim André Hauschild
31	(Qatar) QMMF by HRT	Am	(Qatar) Abdulla Ali Al-Khelaifi	(Qatar) Ghanim Al-Ali	(Qatar) Ibrahim Al-Abdulghani	(Germany) Julian Hanses
33	(Netherlands) Tierra Outdoor Racing by HWM	PA	(Netherlands) Ralph Poppelaars	(Netherlands) Jop Rappange	(Netherlands) Hans Weijs	
36	(Germany) KKrämer Racing	Am	(Germany) Karsten Krämer	(Germany) Michele Di Martino	(Germany) Fidel Leib	(Germany) Marlon Menden
48	(Germany) BLACK FALCON Team 48 LOSCH	P	(Netherlands) Loek Hartog	(Germany) Christopher Mies	(Germany) Tobias Müller	(Germany) Noah Nagelsdiek
56	(France) Ancel Motors by Porsche Lorient Racing	Am	(France) Frédéric Ancel	(France) Franck Dezoteux	(France) Pascal Gibon	
78	(Belgium) Speedlover	PA	(Netherlands) Jean-pierre Verhoeven	(Netherlands) Jaxon Verhoeven	(Belgium) Kurt Hensen	
85	(Austria) Neuhofer Rennsport	Am	(Hong Kong) Eric Kwong	(Hong Kong) Henry Kwong	(China) Dylan Yip	(China) Jinlong Bao
86	(Austria) Neuhofer Rennsport	P	(Austria) Felix Neuhofer	(Germany) Alfred Renauer	(Germany) Robert Renauer	(Austria) Martin Ragginger
88	(Germany) MRS GT Racing	Am	(Brazil) Rouman Ziemkiewicz	(Brazil) Carlos Vidigal Renaux	(Brazil) Marcus Vinicius Neves	(Brazil) Eduardo Menossi
89	(Germany) MRS GT Racing	Am	(Brazil) Francisco Horta	(Brazil) Lucas Salles	(Brazil) Nelson Monteiro	(Brazil) Marcio Mauro
90	(Germany) MRS GT Racing	PA	(United States) Therese Lahlouh	(New Zealand) Madeline Stewart	(United Kingdom) Alexander Sedgwick	(United States) Nik Romano
98	Belgium Racing	PA	(Belgium) Michael Cool	(Belgium) Ghislain Cordeel	(Belgium) Kobe de Breucker	
99	Belgium Racing	PA	(Belgium) Dylan Derdaele	(Belgium) Jan Lauryssen	(Netherlands) Sacha Norden	
233	(Germany) Team Laptime-Performance	Am	(Canada) Reinhold Krahn	(United States) Adrian Comstock	(United States) Thomas Merrill	(United States) Charlie Hayes
888	(France) Seblajoux Racing by DUWO Racing	Am	(France) Sebastien Lajoux	(France) Stephane Perrin	(France) Laurent Misbach	(France) Mathys Jaubert
911	(Austria) Elfer Motorhome	Am	(Austria) Leo Pichler	(Austria) Kevin Raith	(Austria) Andreas Höfler	(Austria) Peter Eibisberger
935	(Netherlands) JW Raceservice	PA	(China) Ling Kang	(Macau) Yao Liangbo	(China) Lu Zhiwei	(Hong Kong) Liu Kaishun
992	(Germany) PTE operated by Manthey Racing	Am	(Dominican Republic) Joel Monegro	(Australia) Campbell Nunn	(Finland) Jukka Honkavuori	(Germany) Constantin Dressler

Icon	Class
P	Pro
PA	Pro/Am
Am	Am

== Practice ==
- Only the top 3 is shown.

Free Practice	Place	No.	Entrant	Time
Free Practice	1st	888	(France) Seblajoux Racing by DUWO Racing	2:20.684
Free Practice	2nd	12	(Netherlands) Team GP Elite	2:20.836
Free Practice	3rd	48	(Germany) Black Falcon Team 48 LOSCH	2:21.103
Night Practice	1st	29	(China) Toro Racing by HRT Performance	2:22.257
Night Practice	2nd	31	(Qatar) QMMF by HRT	2:22.739
Night Practice	3rd	5	(Germany) Black Falcon	2:22.785

== Qualifying ==
=== Qualifying results ===
Pole positions in each class are indicated in bold.

Pos.	Class	No.	Team	Q1	Q2	Q3	Avg
1	P	**8**	**(Germany) Max Kruse Racing**	2:24.316	2:22.217	2:20.837	**2:22.456**
2	P	4	(Belgium) Mühlner Motorsport	2:23.674	2:21.916	2:22.406	2:22.665
3	P	86	(Austria) Neuhofer Rennsport	2:31.480	2:22.301	2:21.076	2:24.952
4	PA	**99**	**Belgium Racing**	2:31.629	2:22.300	2:21.210	**2:25.046**
5	P	48	(Germany) BLACK FALCON Team 48 LOSCH	2:33.371	2:21.248	2:20.542	2:25.053
6	PA	5	(Germany) BLACK FALCON	2:34.395	2:21.686	2:19.741	2:25.274
7	PA	18	(Belgium) Mühlner Motorsport	2:32.066	2:22.062	2:22.235	2:25.454
8	Am	**21**	**(Belgium) Mühlner Motorsport**	2:29.557	2:22.422	2:24.501	**2:25.493**
9	PA	90	(Germany) MRS GT Racing	2:25.212	2:23.652	2:28.683	2:25.849
10	PA	33	(Netherlands) Tierra Outdoor Racing by HWM	2:34.046	2:24.326	2:21.642	2:26.671
11	PA	98	Belgium Racing	2:37.227	2:21.786	2:21.241	2:26.751
12	Am	85	(Austria) Neuhofer Rennsport	2:34.295	2:24.471	2:22.286	2:27.017
13	P	9	(Netherlands) Red Camel-Jordans.nl	2:37.245	2:22.574	2:21.328	2:27.049
14	P	15	(Belgium) H-2-H Racing	2:36.985	2:23.024	2:21.762	2:27.257
15	P	10	(Germany) Max Kruse Racing	2:35.300	2:23.645	2:22.914	2:27.286
16	Am	888	(France) Seblajoux Racing by DUWO Racing	2:39.388	2:24.741	2:19.733	2:27.954
17	PA	29	(Germany) Toro Racing by HRT Performance	2:38.448	2:25.603	2:20.696	2:28.249
18	Am	31	(Qatar) QMMF by HRT	2:40.039	2:25.151	2:20.832	2:28.674
19	PA	935	(Netherlands) JW Raceservice	2:40.731	2:22.786	2:23.038	2:28.851
20	PA	78	(Belgium) Speedlover	2:34.843	2:23.352	2:28.946	2:29.047
21	Am	992	(Germany) PTE operated by Manthey Racing	2:43.097	2:22.945	2:21.806	2:29.282
22	Am	12	(Netherlands) Team GP-Elite	2:38.354	2:21.661	2:27.972	2:29.329
23	Am	36	(Germany) KKrämer Racing	2:38.980	2:23.047	2:26.526	2:29.517
24	Am	56	(France) Ancel Motors by Porsche Lorient Racing	2:29.636	2:27.510	2:31.764	2:29.636
25	Am	233	(Germany) Team Laptime-Performance	2:39.823	2:29.586	2:21.962	2:30.457
26	Am	88	(Germany) MRS GT Racing	2:38.677	2:29.297	2:27.699	2:31.891
27	Am	89	(Germany) MRS GT Racing	2:40.953	2:29.401	2:36.458	2:35.604
28	Am	911	(Austria) Elfer Motorhome	No time	No time	No time	No time

== Race ==
=== Race results ===
Class winners are in bold.

Pos	Class	No	Team	Drivers	Car	Laps	Time/Reason
Pos	Class	No	Team	Drivers	Engine	Laps	Time/Reason
1	P	**48**	**(Germany) BLACK FALCON Team 48 LOSCH**	**(Netherlands) Loek Hartog** **(Germany) Christopher Mies** **(Germany) Tobias Müller** **(Germany) Noah Nagelsdiek**	**Porsche 992 GT3 Cup**	**276**	**12:01:15.578**
1	P	**48**	**(Germany) BLACK FALCON Team 48 LOSCH**	**(Netherlands) Loek Hartog** **(Germany) Christopher Mies** **(Germany) Tobias Müller** **(Germany) Noah Nagelsdiek**	**Porsche 4.0 L Flat-6**	**276**	**12:01:15.578**
2	P	8	(Germany) Max Kruse Racing	(Netherlands) Jan Jaap van Roon (Netherlands) Tom Coronel (Netherlands) Paul Meijer (Germany) Benjamin Leuchter	Porsche 992 GT3 Cup	275	+1 Lap
2	P	8	(Germany) Max Kruse Racing	(Netherlands) Jan Jaap van Roon (Netherlands) Tom Coronel (Netherlands) Paul Meijer (Germany) Benjamin Leuchter	Porsche 4.0 L Flat-6	275	+1 Lap
3	P	9	(Netherlands) Red Camel-Jordans.nl	(Netherlands) Ivo Breukers (Netherlands) Luc Breukers (Netherlands) Rik Breukers (Switzerland) Fabian Danz	Porsche 992 GT3 Cup	275	+1 Lap
3	P	9	(Netherlands) Red Camel-Jordans.nl	(Netherlands) Ivo Breukers (Netherlands) Luc Breukers (Netherlands) Rik Breukers (Switzerland) Fabian Danz	Porsche 4.0 L Flat-6	275	+1 Lap
4	PA	**33**	**(Netherlands) Tierra Outdoor Racing by HWM**	**(Netherlands) Ralph Poppelaars** **(Netherlands) Jop Rappange** **(Netherlands) Hans Weijs**	**Porsche 992 GT3 Cup**	**275**	**+1 Lap**
4	PA	**33**	**(Netherlands) Tierra Outdoor Racing by HWM**	**(Netherlands) Ralph Poppelaars** **(Netherlands) Jop Rappange** **(Netherlands) Hans Weijs**	**Porsche 4.0 L Flat-6**	**275**	**+1 Lap**
5	P	4	(Belgium) Mühlner Motorsport	(Netherlands) Jeroen Bleekemolen (Estonia) Martin Rump (Germany) Fabio Grosse	Porsche 992 GT3 Cup	273	+3 Laps
5	P	4	(Belgium) Mühlner Motorsport	(Netherlands) Jeroen Bleekemolen (Estonia) Martin Rump (Germany) Fabio Grosse	Porsche 4.0 L Flat-6	273	+3 Laps
6	PA	99	Belgium Racing	(Belgium) Dylan Derdaele (Belgium) Jan Lauryssen (Netherlands) Sacha Norden	Porsche 992 GT3 Cup	272	+4 Laps
6	PA	99	Belgium Racing	(Belgium) Dylan Derdaele (Belgium) Jan Lauryssen (Netherlands) Sacha Norden	Porsche 4.0 L Flat-6	272	+4 Laps
7	P	10	(Germany) Max Kruse Racing	(Germany) Marcel Fugel (Germany) Dominik Fugel (Germany) Nico Otto (Germany) Benjamin Leuchter	Porsche 992 GT3 Cup	272	+4 Laps
7	P	10	(Germany) Max Kruse Racing	(Germany) Marcel Fugel (Germany) Dominik Fugel (Germany) Nico Otto (Germany) Benjamin Leuchter	Porsche 4.0 L Flat-6	272	+4 Laps
8	Am	**31**	**(Qatar) QMMF by HRT**	**(Qatar) Abdulla Ali Al-Khelaifi** **(Qatar) Ghanim Al-Ali** **(Qatar) Ibrahim Al-Abdulghani** **(Germany) Julian Hanses**	**Porsche 992 GT3 Cup**	**272**	**+4 Laps**
8	Am	**31**	**(Qatar) QMMF by HRT**	**(Qatar) Abdulla Ali Al-Khelaifi** **(Qatar) Ghanim Al-Ali** **(Qatar) Ibrahim Al-Abdulghani** **(Germany) Julian Hanses**	**Porsche 4.0 L Flat-6**	**272**	**+4 Laps**
9	PA	98	Belgium Racing	(Belgium) Michael Cool (Belgium) Ghislain Cordeel (Belgium) Kobe de Breucker	Porsche 992 GT3 Cup	272	+4 Laps
9	PA	98	Belgium Racing	(Belgium) Michael Cool (Belgium) Ghislain Cordeel (Belgium) Kobe de Breucker	Porsche 4.0 L Flat-6	272	+4 Laps
10	Am	85	(Austria) Neuhofer Rennsport	(Hong Kong) Eric Kwong (Hong Kong) Henry Kwong (China) Dylan Yip (China) Jinlong Bao	Porsche 992 GT3 Cup	271	+5 Laps
10	Am	85	(Austria) Neuhofer Rennsport	(Hong Kong) Eric Kwong (Hong Kong) Henry Kwong (China) Dylan Yip (China) Jinlong Bao	Porsche 4.0 L Flat-6	271	+5 Laps
11	Am	888	(France) SebLajoux Racing by DUWO Racing	(France) Sebastien Lajoux (France) Stephane Perrin (France) Laurent Misbach (France) Mathys Jaubert	Porsche 992 GT3 Cup	271	+5 Laps
11	Am	888	(France) SebLajoux Racing by DUWO Racing	(France) Sebastien Lajoux (France) Stephane Perrin (France) Laurent Misbach (France) Mathys Jaubert	Porsche 4.0 L Flat-6	271	+5 Laps
12	Am	992	(Germany) PTE operated by Manthey Racing	(Dominican Republic) Joel Monegro (Australia) Campbell Nunn (Finland) Jukka Honkavuori (Germany) Constantin Dressler	Porsche 992 GT3 Cup	271	+5 Laps
12	Am	992	(Germany) PTE operated by Manthey Racing	(Dominican Republic) Joel Monegro (Australia) Campbell Nunn (Finland) Jukka Honkavuori (Germany) Constantin Dressler	Porsche 4.0 L Flat-6	271	+5 Laps
13	PA	5	(Germany) BLACK FALCON	(Turkey) Mustafa Mehmet Kaya (Germany) Christopher Mies (Italy) Gabriele Piana (Germany) Mike Stursberg	Porsche 992 GT3 Cup	270	+6 Laps
13	PA	5	(Germany) BLACK FALCON	(Turkey) Mustafa Mehmet Kaya (Germany) Christopher Mies (Italy) Gabriele Piana (Germany) Mike Stursberg	Porsche 4.0 L Flat-6	270	+6 Laps
14	Am	911	(Austria) Elfer Motorhome	(Austria) Leo Pichler (Austria) Kevin Raith (Austria) Andreas Höfler (Austria) Peter Eibisberger	Porsche 992 GT3 Cup	269	+7 Laps
14	Am	911	(Austria) Elfer Motorhome	(Austria) Leo Pichler (Austria) Kevin Raith (Austria) Andreas Höfler (Austria) Peter Eibisberger	Porsche 4.0 L Flat-6	269	+7 Laps
15	PA	29	(Germany) Toro Racing by HRT Performance	(China) Eric Zang (China) Dennis Zhang (United Kingdom) Adam Christodoulou (Germany) Kim André Hauschild	Porsche 992 GT3 Cup	267	+9 Laps
15	PA	29	(Germany) Toro Racing by HRT Performance	(China) Eric Zang (China) Dennis Zhang (United Kingdom) Adam Christodoulou (Germany) Kim André Hauschild	Porsche 4.0 L Flat-6	267	+9 Laps
16	P	86	(Austria) Neuhofer Rennsport	(Austria) Felix Neuhofer (Germany) Alfred Renauer (Germany) Robert Renauer (Austria) Martin Ragginger	Porsche 992 GT3 Cup	267	+9 Laps^{1}
16	P	86	(Austria) Neuhofer Rennsport	(Austria) Felix Neuhofer (Germany) Alfred Renauer (Germany) Robert Renauer (Austria) Martin Ragginger	Porsche 4.0 L Flat-6	267	+9 Laps^{1}
17	Am	233	(Germany) Team Laptime-Performance	(Canada) Reinhold Krahn (United States) Adrian Comstock (United States) Thomas Merrill (United States) Charlie Hayes	Porsche 992 GT3 Cup	267	+9 Laps
17	Am	233	(Germany) Team Laptime-Performance	(Canada) Reinhold Krahn (United States) Adrian Comstock (United States) Thomas Merrill (United States) Charlie Hayes	Porsche 4.0 L Flat-6	267	+9 Laps
18	Am	56	(France) Ancel Motors by Porsche Lorient Racing	(France) Frédéric Ancel (France) Franck Dezoteux (France) Pascal Gibon	Porsche 992 GT3 Cup	264	+12 Laps
18	Am	56	(France) Ancel Motors by Porsche Lorient Racing	(France) Frédéric Ancel (France) Franck Dezoteux (France) Pascal Gibon	Porsche 4.0 L Flat-6	264	+12 Laps
19	Am	12	(Netherlands) Team GP-Elite	(Netherlands) Peter Munnichs (Netherlands) Koen Munnichs (Netherlands) Wouter Boerekamps	Porsche 992 GT3 Cup	254	+22 Laps
19	Am	12	(Netherlands) Team GP-Elite	(Netherlands) Peter Munnichs (Netherlands) Koen Munnichs (Netherlands) Wouter Boerekamps	Porsche 4.0 L Flat-6	254	+22 Laps
20	PA	78	(Belgium) Speedlover	(Netherlands) Jean-pierre Verhoeven (Netherlands) Jaxon Verhoeven (Belgium) Kurt Hensen	Porsche 992 GT3 Cup	254	+22 Laps
20	PA	78	(Belgium) Speedlover	(Netherlands) Jean-pierre Verhoeven (Netherlands) Jaxon Verhoeven (Belgium) Kurt Hensen	Porsche 4.0 L Flat-6	254	+22 Laps
21 DNF	PA	18	(Belgium) Mühlner Motorsport	(Canada) Parker Thompson (United States) Jared Thomas (United States) Anthony McIntosh (United States) Glenn McGee	Porsche 992 GT3 Cup	248	Rear Axle
21 DNF	PA	18	(Belgium) Mühlner Motorsport	(Canada) Parker Thompson (United States) Jared Thomas (United States) Anthony McIntosh (United States) Glenn McGee	Porsche 4.0 L Flat-6	248	Rear Axle
22 DNF	P	15	(Belgium) H-2-H Racing	(Belgium) Gilles Verleyen (Belgium) Guillaume Mondron (Belgium) Mathieu Detry (Kyrgyzstan) Stanislav Minsky	Porsche 992 GT3 Cup	241	Oil Pump
22 DNF	P	15	(Belgium) H-2-H Racing	(Belgium) Gilles Verleyen (Belgium) Guillaume Mondron (Belgium) Mathieu Detry (Kyrgyzstan) Stanislav Minsky	Porsche 4.0 L Flat-6	241	Oil Pump
23	Am	88	(Germany) MRS GT Racing	(Brazil) Rouman Ziemkiewicz (Brazil) Carlos Vidigal Renaux (Brazil) Marcus Vinicius Neves (Brazil) Eduardo Menossi	Porsche 992 GT3 Cup	240	+36 Laps
23	Am	88	(Germany) MRS GT Racing	(Brazil) Rouman Ziemkiewicz (Brazil) Carlos Vidigal Renaux (Brazil) Marcus Vinicius Neves (Brazil) Eduardo Menossi	Porsche 4.0 L Flat-6	240	+36 Laps
24	Am	21	(Belgium) Mühlner Motorsport	(New Zealand) Ryan Yardley (United States) Anthony McIntosh (United States) Glenn McGee (United States) Tyler Hoffman	Porsche 992 GT3 Cup	235	+41 Laps
24	Am	21	(Belgium) Mühlner Motorsport	(New Zealand) Ryan Yardley (United States) Anthony McIntosh (United States) Glenn McGee (United States) Tyler Hoffman	Porsche 4.0 L Flat-6	235	+41 Laps
25	PA	935	(Belgium) Speedlover	(China) Ling Kang (Macau) Yao Liangbo (China) Lu Zhiwei (Hong Kong) Liu Kaishun	Porsche 992 GT3 Cup	226	+50 Laps
25	PA	935	(Belgium) Speedlover	(China) Ling Kang (Macau) Yao Liangbo (China) Lu Zhiwei (Hong Kong) Liu Kaishun	Porsche 4.0 L Flat-6	226	+50 Laps
26	Am	36	(Germany) KKrämer Racing	(Germany) Karsten Krämer (Germany) Michele Di Martino (Germany) Fidel Leib (Germany) Marlon Menden	Porsche 992 GT3 Cup	217	+59 Laps
26	Am	36	(Germany) KKrämer Racing	(Germany) Karsten Krämer (Germany) Michele Di Martino (Germany) Fidel Leib (Germany) Marlon Menden	Porsche 4.0 L Flat-6	217	+59 Laps
27 DNF	Am	89	(Germany) MRS GT Racing	(Brazil) Francisco Horta (Brazil) Lucas Salles (Brazil) Nelson Monteiro (Brazil) Marcio Mauro	Porsche 992 GT3 Cup	202	Crash
27 DNF	Am	89	(Germany) MRS GT Racing	(Brazil) Francisco Horta (Brazil) Lucas Salles (Brazil) Nelson Monteiro (Brazil) Marcio Mauro	Porsche 4.0 L Flat-6	202	Crash
28 DNF	PA	90	(Germany) MRS GT Racing	(United States) Therese Lahlouh (New Zealand) Madeline Stewart (United Kingdom) Alexander Sedgwick (United States) Nik Romano	Porsche 992 GT3 Cup	141	Wheel Hub
28 DNF	PA	90	(Germany) MRS GT Racing	(United States) Therese Lahlouh (New Zealand) Madeline Stewart (United Kingdom) Alexander Sedgwick (United States) Nik Romano	Porsche 4.0 L Flat-6	141	Wheel Hub

•^{1} The No. 86 Neuhofer Rennsport entry received a post-race, eight-lap penalty due to a drive time infringement.
