= MW Motorsport =

Australian motor-racing team

- Manufacturer: Super 2: Nissan; Super 3: Ford
- Team Principal: Matthew White
- Team Manager: Matthew White
- Race Drivers: Super 2: 3.Thomas Maxwell; 6.Angelo Mouzouris; 27.Tyler Everingham; Super 3:
- Chassis: Super 2: Altima L33; Super 3: FG Falcon
- Debut: 2000 (Supercars); 2000 (Super2)
- Drivers' Championships: 5
- Round wins: 8
- 2020 position: 0
- 1st (Thomas Randle)

MW Motorsport (formerly known as Matthew White Racing) was a motor-racing team that is competing in the Dunlop Super3 Series. The team previously raced with Nissan Altimas, with Thomas Maxwell, and Cody Burcher.

The team was formed by Matthew White in 2000 to further his own racing ambitions. Originally Matthew White Racing was a privateer V8 Supercar team, specifically supporting White's career, but he took on a customer driver for the first time in 2002 and the team gradually changed over the next five years into a professional pay driver operation in the Fujitsu V8 Supercar Series. The team made infrequent appearances at V8 Supercar endurance races.

== Kumho Tyre Series ==
MW Motorsport first entered the Kumho Tyre Series in 2016, Running Garry Jacobson in an ex-FPR FG Falcon in rounds 4 & 5 of the series at Phillip Island and Sydney Motorsport Park. He would win all bar one race and finish sixth in the championship despite only competing in two rounds.

After taking a hiatus in 2017, the team would return for the 2018 season with first year drivers Zak Best and Tyler Everingham. the pair would finish 1–2 in the series with Everingham winning ten races on his way to the series title.

For 2019, Best stayed with the team and was joined by Hamish Ribarits and Nic Carroll. Ribarits & Best would win races on their way to third and fourth in the series respectively. Carroll would finish sixth.

In the shortened 2020 series, Jaylyn Robotham would sign on for the two rounds contested. He would sweep the series, winning all four races and taking three out of four poles.

== Super 2 Series ==
The team's greatest success was in the 2009 Fujitsu V8 Supercar Series when Jonathon Webb won the series winning all but one race in the second half of the season.

For 2012, the team would run Luke Youlden as their only full-time driver, finishing fifth in the series. The other full-time car would be split between several drivers. Morgan Haber would be entered for the fourth round of the series in Ipswich.

In 2013, the team would run 3 full time cars, with Dale Wood & Morgan Haber entered for all rounds. Steve Owen would drive the third car for rounds 2 through 7 after Chaz Mostert was called up to the Supercars Championship after round 1. Wood would go on to win the championship with 3 race wins. Owen would finish sixth overall despite missing the first round, Haber would finish 24th.

For 2014, the team would only run one driver full time, Andre Heimgartner in the 28, with the other two cars being split between a variety of drivers. Steve Owen and Dean Fiore would score podiums in the single rounds they contested for the team. Heimgartner finished fifth overall.

In 2015, the team once again ran three cars, with two cars being run as MW Motorsport cars, driven by Jack Le Brocq, Chris Pither & Bryce Fullwood for the final round, and the third under the Super Black Racing name, driven by Simon Evans. Le Brocq would finish third in the final standings for the year, with Evans ninth.

2016 was a lean year for the team. Bryce Fullwood would be the team's only full-time entrant, with the 28 car being split between Chelsea Angelo and Jesse Dixon. Shae Davies would miss the final event at Homebush. The team only took two podiums all year.

For 2017, the team switched to Nissan and run a pair of Nissan Altima Supercars for Shae Davies and Jack Le Brocq, although Bryce Fullwood will campaign an older generation Ford FG Falcon up until the Townsville round, where he is expected to upgrade to the COTF Nissan Altima. They will then become the first non-Holden or Ford Team in the series. Additionally the team entered Davies and Le Brocq in selected rounds of the 2017 Supercars Championship as wildcard entries.

In 2018, the team entered three Nissan Altima's for Dean Fiore, Garry Jacobson and Alex Rullo. All three drivers won races throughout the season. Jacobson and Rullo finished third and fourth respectively in the championship.

For 2019, the team welcomed back Bryce Fullwood, also running rookie Tyler Everingham and second year driver Zane Goddard. Fullwood dominated the series, winning six races and finishing off the podium only three times. Goddard finished fourth in the championship with Everingham seventh after winning in the wet at the Sandown round.

In 2020, the team entered a totally new lineup. Thomas Randle partnering rookies Jayden Ojeda and Zak Best, who moved up from MW Motorsport's Super3 program.

In 2021, the team scaled up to a Four Car Team with Jayden Ojeda staying with the team, Tyler Everingham returning to the team after one year with Anderson Motorsport, Josh Fife joins the team for his second year in the Super2 after leaving Brad Jones Racing and Declan Fraser who has graduated up to the Super2. Fife drove for the team for four rounds before switching to Eggleston Motorsport for Round 5 at Bathurst.

In 2022, the team scaled back to a Three Car Team with Tyler Everingham staying with the team, Declan Fraser left the team after one year and joined Triple Eight Race Engineering he was replaced by Angelo Mouzouris joined the team for his third year in the Super2 after two seasons with Triple Eight Race Engineering and Thomas Maxwell joined the team in the third car. Dean Fiore joined the team for Round 4 at Sandown in a fourth car.

In 2023, the team switched to Ford and scaled back a One Car Team after purchasing an ex-Tickford Racing Ford Mustang GT for Jaylyn Robotham who returned to the after two years with Image Racing having previously driven for the team's Super3 Program. The team ran the car at Round 1 before withdrawing there Super2 program. They ran one Nissan Altima L33 for Valentino Astuti for the final two rounds at Sandown and Bathurst for the Super3 Series.

In 2024, the team switched back to Nissan and scaled up to a Two Car Team for Super3 Series with Thomas Maxwell returning to the team after one year in Porsche Carrera Cup Australia and the other car driven by Cody Burcher who graduated from the Toyota 86 Racing Series.

== Results ==
=== Super 2 results ===
==== Car No. 28 results ====
Year	Driver	No.	Make	1	2	3	4	5	6	7	8	9	10	11	12	13	14	15	16	17	18	19	20	Position	Pts
2003	Matthew White	28	Ford AU Falcon	WAK; R1; 4	WAK; R2; 8	WAK; R3; 6	ADE; R4; 4	EAS; R5; 6	EAS; R6; 7	EAS; R7; 1	PHI; R8; 6	PHI; R9; 3	PHI; R10; 1	WIN; R11; 2	WIN; R12; 9	WIN; R13; 4	MAL; R14; 2	MAL; R15; 8	MAL; R16; 2					2nd	864
2004	Matthew White	28	Ford AU Falcon	WAK; R1; 2	WAK; R2; 15	WAK; R3; 2	ADE; R4; 3	ADE; R5; 2	WIN; R6; 4	WIN; R7; Ret	WIN; R8; 5	EAS; R9; 3	EAS; R10; 23	EAS; R11; Ret	QLD; R12; 4	QLD; R13; 9	QLD; R14; 4	MAL; R15; 5	MAL; R16; 25	MAL; R17; 6				6th	827
2005	Dean Wanless	28	Ford AU Falcon	ADE; R1; Ret	ADE; R2; 11	WAK; R3; 14	WAK; R4; 3	WAK; R5; 15	EAS; R6; 13	EAS; R7; 12	EAS; R8; 23	QLD; R9; Ret	QLD; R10; DNS	QLD; R11; DNS	MAL; R12; 14	MAL; R13; 17	MAL; R14; 18	BAT; R15; Ret	BAT; R16; C	PHI; R17; 10	PHI; R18; 11			16th	537
2006	Matthew White	28	Ford BA Falcon	ADE; R1; 26	ADE; R2; 24	WAK; R3; 9	WAK; R4; 17	WAK; R5; 12	QLD; R6	QLD; R7	QLD; R8	ORA; R9; 5	ORA; R10; 16	ORA; R11; 5	MAL; R12; 15	MAL; R13; 24	MAL; R14; 15	BAT; R15; 7	BAT; R16; 6	PHI; R17; 4	PHI; R18; 3			10th	1272
2009	Brad Lowe	28	Ford BF Falcon	ADE; R1; Ret	ADE; R2; 8	WIN; R3; 3	WIN; R4; 9	WIN; R5; 4	TOW; R6; 5	TOW; R7; 10	TOW; R8; Ret	SAN; R9; 3	SAN; R10; 13	SAN; R11; 9	QLD; R12; 6	QLD; R13; 3	QLD; R14; 5	BAT; R15; 7	BAT; R16; 3	HOM; R17; Ret	HOM; R18; Ret			6th	1077
2010	David Russell	28	Ford BF Falcon	ADE; R1; 14	ADE; R2; 3	QLD; R3; 3	QLD; R4; 8	QLD; R5; Ret	WIN; R6; 5	WIN; R7; 1	WIN; R8; 19	TOW; R9; 3	TOW; R10; 4	TOW; R11; 4	BAT; R12; 1	BAT; R13; 1	SAN; R14; 4	SAN; R15; 8	SAN; R16; 1	HOM; R17; 18	HOM; R18; 12			5th	1437
2011	David Russell	28	Ford BF Falcon	ADE; R1; 8	ADE; R2; 13	QLD; R3; 4	QLD; R4; 2	TOW; R5; 2	TOW; R6; 4	TOW; R7; 3	QLD; R8; 5	QLD; R9; 3	QLD; R10; 2	BAT; R11; 2	BAT; R12; 2	SAN; R13; 4	SAN; R14; 16	SAN; R15; 5	HOM; R16; 4	HOM; R17; 8				3rd	1594

=== Bathurst 1000 Results ===
Year	No.	Car	Drivers	Pos.	Laps
2000	76	Holden VS Commodore	(Australia) Matthew White (Australia) Steve Owen	24th	143
2009	21	Ford BF Falcon	(Australia) Brad Lowe (Australia) Damian Assaillit	22nd	151
2010	27	Ford BF Falcon	(New Zealand) Ant Pedersen (Australia) Damian Assaillit	26th	153

== Supercars Championship ==
The team was granted a wildcard entry for the 2009 L&H 500 and 2009 Supercheap Auto Bathurst 1000. Brad Lowe and Damian Assaillit drove the car to a 23rd-place finish at Phillip Island. The pair would go on to finish 22nd at Bathurst.

The team would do the same in 2010, entering the L&H 500 & the Supercheap Auto Bathurst 1000, this time pairing Ant Pedersen with Damian Assailit. They would fare slightly better at Phillip Island, finishing 22nd, and slightly worse at Bathurst, finishing 26th.

The team planned to enter the endurance races again in 2011 however were unable to due to funding issues.

MW Motorsport would not attempt another wildcard until the 2017 Supercars Championship, in which they entered their Super 2 Drivers Shae Davies & Jack Le Brocq. Davies would contest the 5th round at Winton, Le Brocq the sixth at Hidden Valley. Both would enter the 8th round at Queensland Raceway, achieving modest results.

== Drivers ==
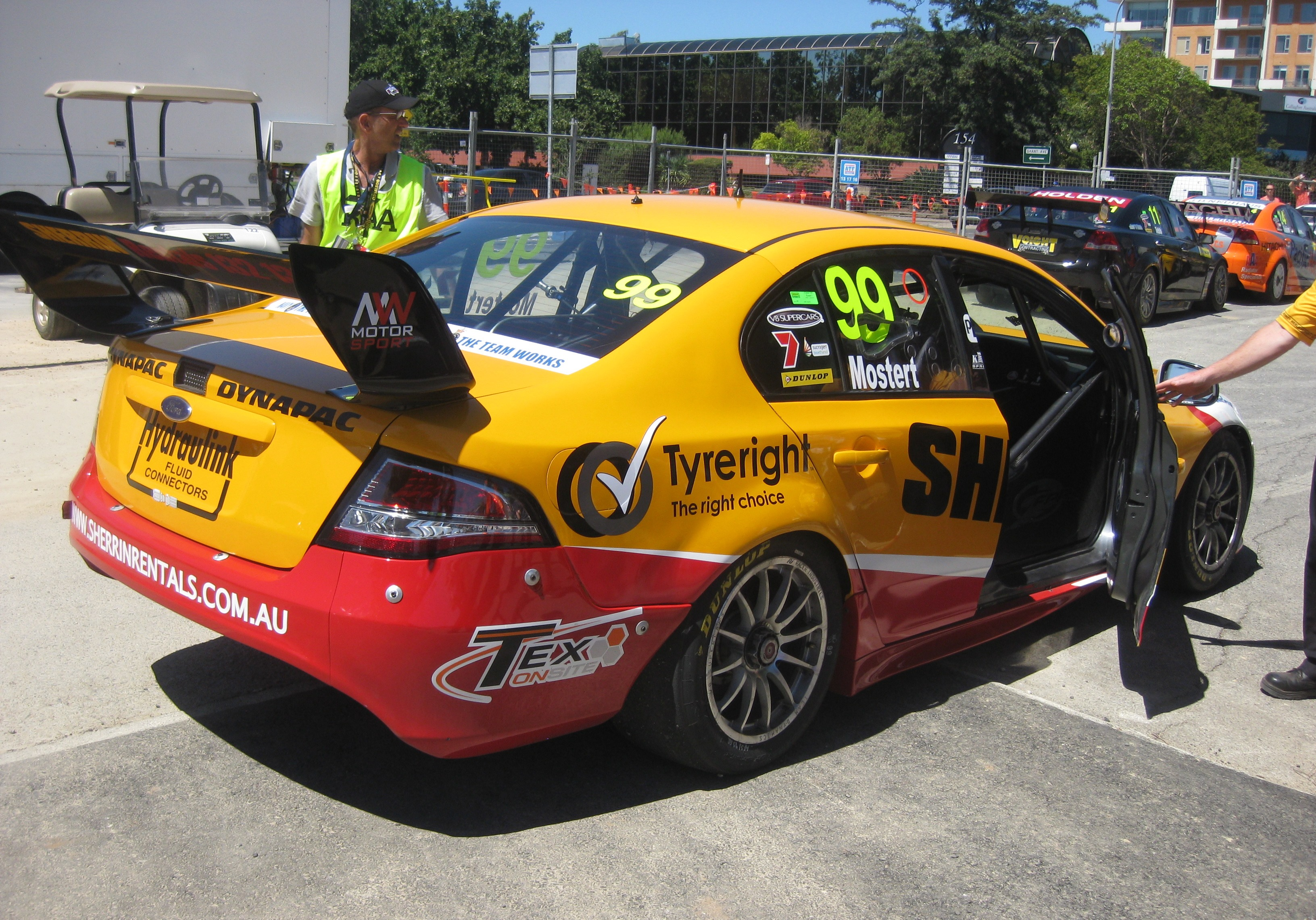
The MW Motorsport Ford FG Falcon in which Chaz Mostert won the Adelaide round of the 2013 Dunlop Series

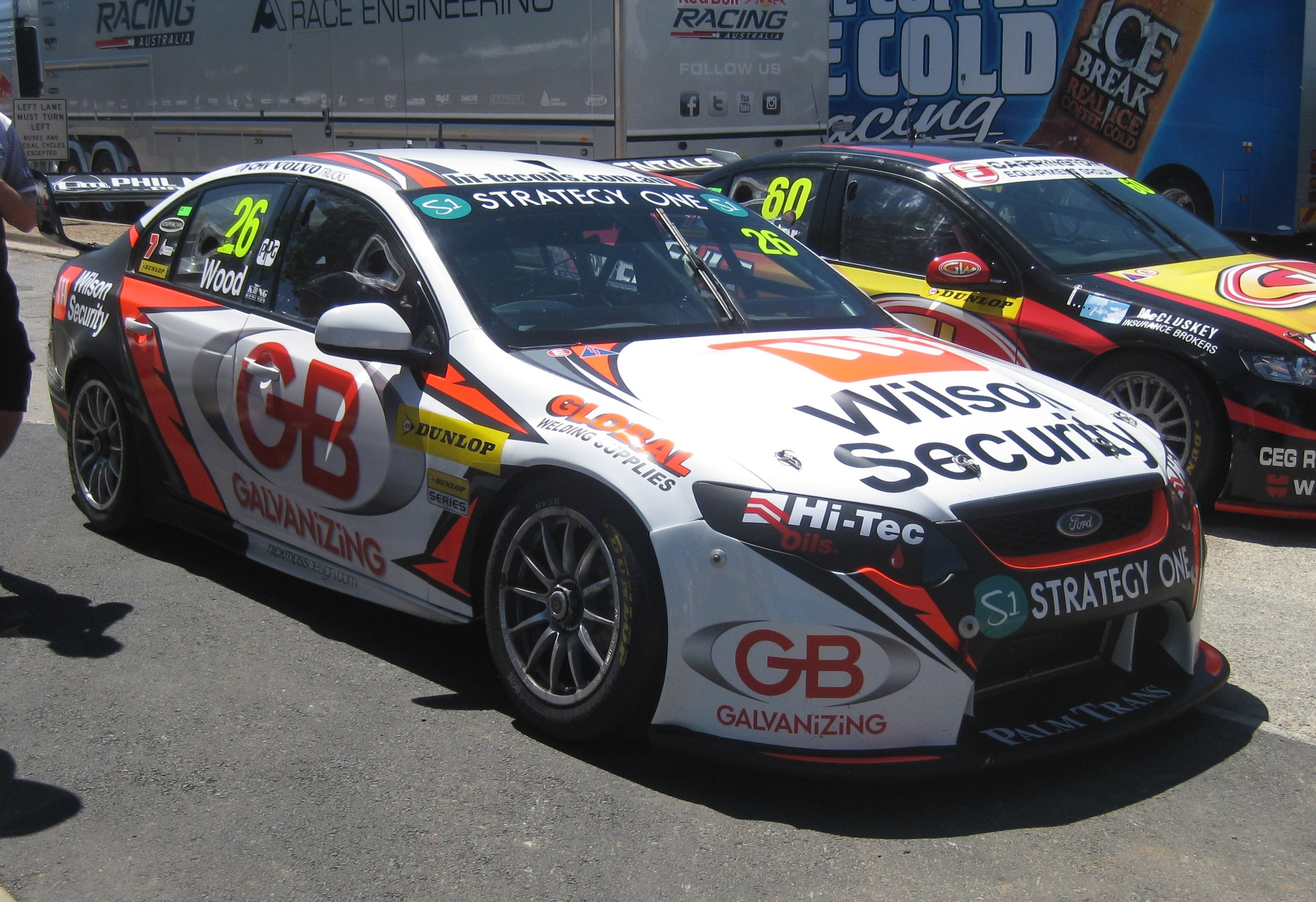
The MW Motorsport Ford FG Falcon in which Dale Wood is contesting the 2013 Dunlop Series

Year	Driver	Race Starts
2002–04, 2006–08, 2010	(Australia) Matthew White	75
2002	(Australia) Michael Turner	14
2004–06	(Australia) Dean Wanless	40
2006	(Australia) Wayne Wakefield	12
2007	(Australia) Geoff Emery	?
2007	(Australia) Clayton Pyne	2
2007	(New Zealand) John McIntyre	6
2007	(Australia) Tim Slade	16
2007–08	(Australia) Grant Denyer	27
2007, 2010	(Australia) Marcus Marshall	8
2008	(New Zealand) Andy Knight	3
2008	(Australia) Nandi Kiss	3
2008–09	(Australia) Damian Assaillit	36
2008–09	(Australia) Brad Lowe	20
2009	(Australia) Jonathon Webb	18
2010	(United Kingdom) Ben Barker	2
2010	(Australia) Tony Bates	5
2010	(New Zealand) Ant Pedersen	8
2010	(New Zealand) Matthew Hamilton	8
2010–11	(Australia) Tom Tweedie	17
2010–11	(Australia) David Russell	35
2010, 12	(Australia) Luke Youlden	10
2011–12, 2014	(Australia) Tim Blanchard	24
2012	(Australia) Elliot Barbour	1
2012–14	(Australia) Morgan Haber	21
2013	(Australia) Chaz Mostert	1
2013–14	(Australia) Steve Owen	19
2013	(Australia) Dale Wood	18
2014	(New Zealand) Andre Heimgartner	13
2014	(Australia) Ryan Simpson	2
2014, 2018	(Australia) Dean Fiore	4
2014	(Australia) Kurt Kostecki	2
2013, 2015, 2017	(Australia) Jack Le Brocq	44
2015	(New Zealand) Chris Pither	14
2015–17, 2019	(Australia) Bryce Fullwood	18
2016–17	(Australia) Shae Davies	14
2016	(Australia) Jesse Dixon	1
2016	(Australia) Chelsea Angelo	6
2018	(Australia) Garry Jacobson	15
2018	(Australia) Alex Rullo	15
2019	(Australia) Zane Goddard	14
2019, 2021–2022	(Australia) Tyler Everingham	34
2020	(Australia) Thomas Randle	7
2020–2021	(Australia) Jayden Ojeda	17
2020	(Australia) Zak Best	7
2021	(Australia) Josh Fife	8
2021	(Australia) Declan Fraser	8
2022	(Australia) Thomas Maxwell	12
2022	(Australia) Angelo Mouzouris	11
2023	(Australia) Jaylyn Robotham	2

=== Super2 Drivers ===
- (Australia) Matthew White (2002–2004, 2006–2008, 2010)
- (Australia) Michael Turner (2002)
- (Australia) Dean Wanless (2004–2006)
- (Australia) Wayne Wakefield (2006)
- (Australia) Marcus Marshall (2007, 2010)
- (New Zealand) John McIntyre (2007)
- (Australia) Geoff Emery (2007)
- (Australia) Tim Slade (2007)
- (Australia) Grant Denyer (2007–2008)
- (New Zealand) Andy Knight (2008)
- (Australia) Brad Lowe (2008–2009)
- (Australia) Damian Assaillit (2008–2009)
- (Australia) Jonathon Webb (2009)
- (New Zealand) Matthew Hamilton (2010)
- (New Zealand) Ant Pedersen (2010)
- (Australia) Luke Youlden (2010, 2012)
- (United Kingdom) Ben Baker (2010)
- (Australia) Tom Tweedie (2010–2011)
- (Australia) Tony Bates (2010)
- (Australia) David Russell (2010–2011)
- (Australia) Tim Blanchard (2011–2012, 2014)
- (Australia) Morgan Haber (2012–2014)
- (Australia) Elliot Barbour (2012)
- (Australia) Dale Wood (2013)
- (Australia) Chaz Mostert (2013)
- (Australia) Steve Owen (2013–2014)
- (New Zealand) Andre Heimgartner (2014)
- (Australia) Ryan Simpson (2014)
- (Australia) Dean Fiore (2014, 2018, 2022)
- (Australia) Peter Rullo (2014)
- (Australia) Kurt Kostecki (2014)
- (Australia) Jack Le Brocq (2015, 2017)
- (New Zealand) Chris Pither (2015)
- (Australia) Bryce Fullwood (2015–2017, 2019)
- (New Zealand) Simon Evans (2015)
- (Australia) Shae Davies (2016–2017)
- (Australia) Jesse Dixon (2016)
- (Australia) Chelsea Angelo (2016)
- (Australia) Alex Rullo (2018)
- (Australia) Garry Jacobson (2018)
- (Australia) Tyler Everingham (2019, 2021–2022)
- (Australia) Zane Goddard (2019)
- (Australia) Thomas Randle (2020)
- (Australia) Jayden Ojeda (2020–2021)
- (Australia) Zak Best (2020)
- (Australia) Josh Fife (2021)
- (Australia) Declan Fraser (2021)
- (Australia) Thomas Maxwell (2022)
- (Australia) Angelo Mouzouris (2022)
- (Australia) Jaylyn Robotham (2023)

=== Super3 Drivers ===
- (Australia) Morgan Haber (2012–2013)
- (Australia) Matthew White (2013–2014)
- (Australia) Peter Rullo (2013)
- (Australia) Jack Le Brocq (2013)
- (Australia) Ryan Cochrane (2014)
- (Australia) Garry Jacobson (2016)
- (Australia) Tyler Everingham (2018)
- (Australia) Zak Best (2018–2019)
- (Australia) Hamish Ribarits (2019)
- (Australia) Nic Carroll (2019)
- (Australia) Jaylyn Robotham (2020)
- (Australia) Valentino Astuti (2023)
- (Australia) Thomas Maxwell (2024)
- (Australia) Cody Burcher (2024)
