= 2010 Australian V8 Ute Racing Series =

2010 V8 Ute Racing Series

Seasons
- ← 2009 2011 →

The 2010 Auto One V8 Ute Racing Series was a motor racing series for Ford Falcon and Holden utilities (commonly known as "utes"), built and conforming to V8 Utes series regulations and those holding valid licences to compete as issued by series organisers Spherix and Australian V8 Ute Racing Pty. Ltd. The series formed the tenth running of a national series for V8 Utes in Australia. The series began on 17 March 2010 at the Adelaide Street Circuit and ended on 2 December at the Homebush Street Circuit after 8 rounds.

The series was won by Grant Johnson, driving a Holden VE SS Ute.

== Teams and drivers ==
The following drivers competed in the 2010 V8 Utes series

Team	Car	No.	Driver	Rounds	Endurance Driver
Hi-Tech Motorsport	Ford BF Falcon XR8 Ute	1	(Australia) Jack Elsegood	1–2	(Australia) Andrew Miedecke
Hi-Tech Motorsport	Holden VE Commodore SS Ute	47	(Australia) Grant Johnson	1–2	(Australia) Tony Longhurst
SEW Eurodrive Racing	Ford BF Falcon XR8 Ute	2	(Australia) Noel Edge	1	(Australia) Stephen Robinson
Sage Automation Racing	Holden VE Commodore SS Ute	3	(Australia) Gary Baxter	1–2	(Australia) Cameron McConville
Kanga Racing	Ford BF Falcon XR8 Ute	4	(Australia) Peter Burnitt	1	(New Zealand) Chris Pither
Madashell Motorsport	Ford BF Falcon XR8 Ute	5	(Australia) Steve McFadden		(New Zealand) Charlie O'Brien
Denco/One Construction	Ford BF Falcon XR8 Ute	6	(Australia) Rohan Barry		N/A
JMG Maintenance Racing	Ford BF Falcon XR8 Ute	7	(Australia) Jeremy Gray	1	(Australia) George Miedecke
Sieders Racing Team	Ford BF Falcon XR8 Ute	8	(Australia) David Sieders	1	(Australia) Rod Barrett
Sieders Racing Team	Ford BF Falcon XR8 Ute	9	(Australia) Andrew Fisher	1–2	(Australia) Rick Bates
Variety Group	Holden VE Commodore SS Ute	10	(Australia) Brendon Tucker		N/A
Variety Group	Holden VE Commodore SS Ute	16	(Australia) Grant Ludbey	1	(Australia) Brendon Tucker
Brock Race Engineering	Holden VE Commodore SS Ute	11	(Australia) James Brock		N/A
Brock Race Engineering	Holden VE Commodore SS Ute	31	(Australia) Lauren Gray		N/A
SG Changi	Holden VE Commodore SS Ute	12	(Japan) Ryo Orime		N/A
Wollongong Performance Racing	Ford BF Falcon XR8 Ute	13	(Australia) Gary Carson	1	(Australia) Marcus Zukanovic
Chill Racing	Ford BF Falcon XR8 Ute	14	(Australia) Brad Patton	1	(Australia) Robbie Maddison
Chill Racing	Ford BF Falcon XR8 Ute	32	(Australia) Kurt Wimmer		(Australia)
Charlie O'Brien	Ford BF Falcon XR8 Ute	15	(New Zealand) Charlie O'Brien		N/A
Brunswick Valley Coaches Racing	Ford BF Falcon XR8 Ute	17	(Australia) Robert Jarvis	1	(Australia) Tim Leahey
Samboy Chips Racing	Holden VE Commodore SS Ute	18	(Australia) Scott Jennings	1	(Australia) Paul Morris
Samboy Chips Racing	Holden VE Commodore SS Ute	19	(Australia) Tim Blanchard		N/A
Samboy Chips Racing	Holden VE Commodore SS Ute	56	(Australia) Nathan Pretty		N/A
Samboy Chips Racing	Holden VE Commodore SS Ute	67	(Australia) Paul Morris		N/A
Holden Heaven	Holden VE Commodore SS Ute	20	(Australia) Andrew Schultz		N/A
Revolution Roofing	Holden VE Commodore SS Ute	21	(Australia) Allan Letcher		N/A
Thirsty Camel Racing	Holden VE Commodore SS Ute	22	(Australia) Craig Dontas	1	(Australia) Leanne Tander
Workhorse Racing	Ford BF Falcon XR8 Ute	23	(Australia) Ben Kavich	1	(Australia) Anthony Kavich
Eagle Pro Racing	Holden VE Commodore SS Ute	24	(Australia) Nandi Kiss	1	(Australia) Rod Wilson
GBF Underground Mining	Holden VE Commodore SS Ute	25	(Australia) Paul Williams	1	(Australia) James Brock
West Coast Racing	Holden VE Commodore SS Ute	26	(Australia) Rhys McNally	1	(Australia) Tim Shaw
Bob Jane T-Marts Racing	Holden VE Commodore SS Ute	27	(Australia) Kim Jane	1	(Australia) Steve Owen
Wilson Brothers Racing	Holden VE Commodore SS Ute	30	(Australia) Graham Edwards		N/A
Cribbin Blencowe Estate Agents	Ford BF Falcon XR8 Ute	33	(Australia) Dennis Cribbin		(Australia) Chris Smerdon
Pedigree Racing	Holden VE Commodore SS Ute	34	(Australia) Adam Bressington		(Australia)
iseek Racing	Ford BF Falcon XR8 Ute	37	(Australia) Jason Gomersall	1	(Australia) Steven Bradbury
Williams Race Tech	Holden VE Commodore SS Ute	41	(Australia) Gary MacDonald	1	(Australia) Luke Youlden
Williams Race Tech	Holden VE Commodore SS Ute	71	(Australia) Layton Crambrook	1	(Australia) Mal Rose
Ice Break Racing	Holden VE Commodore SS Ute	42	(New Zealand) Chris Pither		N/A
Ice Break Racing	Ford BF Falcon XR8 Ute	72	(Australia) Pedro Marusic	1	(Australia) Anthony Alford
ISRI Truck Seats Racing	Holden VE Commodore SS Ute	43	(Australia) Steve Hodges	1	(Australia) Matt Lockwood
Grove Fruit Juice Racing	Ford BF Falcon XR8 Ute	44	(Australia) Greg Willis	1	(Australia) Grant Bromley
Rick Gill Motorcycles	Holden VE Commodore SS Ute	51	(Australia) Rick Gill		N/A
Vittoria Coffee Racing	Holden VE Commodore SS Ute	55	(Australia) George Elliott	1	(Australia) Marshall Brewer
Harris Motorsport	Holden VE Commodore SS Ute	58	(Australia) Ryal Harris	1	(Australia) Andrew Schultz
Red Ass Mexican	Ford BF Falcon XR8	66	(Australia) Yanis Derums		N/A
Mangomedia	Holden VE Commodore SS Ute	66	(Australia) Yanis Derums		N/A
Wilson Security Racing	Holden VE Commodore SS Ute	69	(Australia) Charlie Kovacs	1	(Australia) Charlie Kovacs Jr.
Wake Up Backpackers Racing	Holden VE Commodore SS Ute	88	(Australia) Warren Millett	1	(Australia) Matt Holt
Sydney/Complete Soda Blasting	Holden VE Commodore SS Ute	89	(Australia) Martin Miller		N/A
Dunn Motorsport	Ford BF Falcon XR8 Ute	98	(Australia) Colin Dunn		N/A
Dunn Motorsport	Ford BF Falcon XR8 Ute	99	(Australia) Ben Dunn	1	(Australia) Colin Dunn

== Race calendar ==
The 2010 V8 Utes Series consisted of eight rounds, all of which were held on the support programme of the V8 Supercar Championship Series.

Rd.	Race title	Circuit	City / state	Date	Winner
1	(South Australia) Clipsal 500	Adelaide Street Circuit	Adelaide, South Australia	11–14 March	David Sieders
2	(Victoria (state)) Winton Motor Raceway	Winton Motor Raceway	Benalla, Victoria	14–16 May	Grant Johnson
3	(Northern Territory) Skycity Triple Crown	Hidden Valley Raceway	Darwin, Northern Territory	18–20 June	Grant Johnson
4	(Queensland) Sucrogen Townsville 400	Townsville Street Circuit	Townsville, Queensland	9–11 July	Jack Elsegood
5	(Victoria (state)) L & H 500	Phillip Island Grand Prix Circuit	Phillip Island, Victoria	10–12 September	Grant Johnson
6	(New South Wales) Supercheap Auto Bathurst 1000	Mount Panorama Circuit	Bathurst, New South Wales	7–10 October	
7	(Queensland) Armor All Gold Coast 600	Surfers Paradise Street Circuit	Surfers Paradise, Queensland	22–24 October	Chris Pither
8	(New South Wales) Sydney Telstra 500	Homebush Street Circuit	Sydney, New South Wales	3–5 December	Charlie O’Brien
