= 2011 Australian V8 Ute Racing Series =

2011 V8 Ute Racing Series

Seasons
- ← 2010 2012 →

The 2011 Auto One V8 Ute Racing Series was a motor racing series for Ford Falcon and Holden utilities (or "utes") built and conforming to V8 Utes series regulations and those holding valid licences to compete as issued by series organisers Spherix and Australian V8 Ute Racing Pty. Ltd. It was the eleventh running of a national racing series for V8 Utes in Australia. The series began on 17 March 2011 at the Adelaide Street Circuit and ended on 2 December at the Homebush Street Circuit after 8 rounds.

The series was won by Kiwi Chris Pither, over former V8 Supercar driver David Sieders and in third place was Ryal Harris.

== Teams and drivers ==
The following drivers competed in the 2011 V8 Utes series.

| Team | Car | No | Driver | Rounds |
|---|---|---|---|---|
| Hi-Tech Motorsport | Holden VE SS Ute | 1 | Grant Johnson | All |
| Hi-Tech Motorsport | Ford BF Falcon XR8 | 11 | Jack Elsegood | All |
| Hi-Tech Motorsport | Holden VE SS Ute | 26 | Rhys McNally | All |
| Hi-Tech Motorsport | Ford BF Falcon XR8 | 51 | Rick Gill | 2–3 |
| Hi-Tech Motorsport | Holden VE SS Ute | 92 | Jake McNally | 1–2 |
| SEW Eurodrive Racing | Ford BF Falcon XR8 | 2 | Noel Edge | 1–2 |
| Sage Automation/Roof Seal | Holden VE SS Ute | 3 | Gary Baxter | All |
| Big Gun Racing | Ford BF Falcon XR8 | 4 | Peter Burnitt | 1–2 |
| Big Gun Racing | Ford BF Falcon XR8 | 14 | Brad Patton | 1–6 |
| Big Gun Racing | Ford BF Falcon XR8 | 44 | Greg Willis | 2 |
| Big Gun Racing | Ford BF Falcon XR8 | 58 | Ryal Harris | All |
| Priority Engineering Services | Ford BF Falcon XR8 | 5 | Kosi Kalatizidis | 1 |
| Truckline Racing | Ford BF Falcon XR8 | 6 | Ryan Hansford | 1–2 |
| Tinkler Motorsports | Ford BF Falcon XR8 | 7 | Jeremy Gray | 1–2 |
| Tinkler Motorsports | Ford BF Falcon XR8 | 33 | Nathan Tinkler | 5 |
| Sieders Racing Team | Ford BF Falcon XR8 | 8 | David Sieders | All |
| Sieders Racing Team | Ford BF Falcon XR8 | 97 | Rohan Barry | 6 |
| Jesus Racing | Ford BF Falcon XR8 | 9 | Andrew Fisher | 1–3 |
| Auto One Wildcard | Holden VE SS Ute | 10 | Dean Canto | 4 |
| Auto One Wildcard | Holden VE SS Ute | 18 | Tim Blanchard | 3 |
| Auto One Wildcard | Holden VE SS Ute | 20 | Adam Macrow | 8 |
| Auto One Wildcard | Holden VE SS Ute | 52 | Tony Longhurst | 7 |
| Auto One Wildcard | Holden VE SS Ute | 71 | Marcus Zukanovic | 5 |
| Auto One Wildcard | Holden VE SS Ute | 84 | David Besnard | 6 |
| Auto One Wildcard | Ford BF Falcon XR8 | 15 | Charlie O'Brien | 1 |
| Auto One Wildcard | Ford BF Falcon XR8 | 77 | Marcus Marshall | 2 |
| Wollongong Performance Racing | Ford BF Falcon XR8 | 13 | Gary Carson | 1–3 |
| Wollongong Performance Racing | Holden VE SS Ute | 13 | Gary Carson | 4 |
| Wollongong Performance Racing | Ford FG Falcon XR8 | 13 | Gary Carson | 5–8 |
| Future Assist Group | Ford BF Falcon XR8 | 15 | Charlie O'Brien | 1–2 |
| Stephen White Racing | Holden VE SS Ute | 19 | Stephen White | 1 |
| Williams Race Tech | Holden VE SS Ute | 21 | Allan Letcher | 2 |
| Williams Race Tech | Holden VE SS Ute | 30 | Graham Edwards | 1 |
| Williams Race Tech | Holden VE SS Ute | 76 | Garry Hills | |
| Craig Dontas Racing | Holden VE SS Ute | 22 | Craig Dontas | 1–2 |
| Workhorse Racing Team | Ford BF Falcon XR8 | 23 | Ben Kavich | 1–2 |
| Eagle Pro Racing | Holden VE SS Ute | 24 | Nandi Kiss | 1 |
| Transquip Hire/ECR Group | Holden VE SS Ute | 25 | Brendon Cook | 2 |
| Bob Jane T-Marts | Holden VE SS Ute | 27 | Kim Jane | All |
| No Limit Energy Drink | Holden VE SS Ute | 28 | Sean Carter | 1 |
| Calmack Smash Repairs | Holden VE SS Ute | 29 | Nathan Callaghan | 2 |
| Cribbin Blencowe Estate Agents | Holden VE SS Ute | 33 | Denis Cribbin | 6, 8 |
| iseek Racing | Ford BF Falcon XR8 | 37 | Jason Gomersall | 1 |
| Chris Pither Racing | Holden VE SS Ute | 42 | Chris Pither | All |
| Giddyup Horsey Production Racing | Ford BF Falcon XR8 | 48 | Tim Boyle | 7 |
| Vittoria Coffee/DIC Australia | Holden VE SS Ute | 55 | George Elliott | 1–2 |
| Monster Energy | Holden VE SS Ute | 56 | Nathan Pretty | All |
| Walkinshaw Racing | Holden VE SS Ute | 61 | Cameron McConville | All |
| Mangomedia | Holden VE SS Ute | 66 | Yanis Derums | |
| Rare Spares | Ford BF Falcon XR8 | 68 | Kris Walton | 7–8 |
| Red Express Racing | Holden VE SS Ute | 69 | Charlie Kovacs | 1–2 |
| Western General Body Works | Ford BF Falcon XR8 | 72 | Danny Buzadic | 7–8 |
| Wake-Up Backpackers Racing | Holden VE SS Ute | 88 | Warren Millett | 1–2 |
| Dunn Motorsport | Ford BF Falcon XR8 | 99 | Ben Dunn | 1–2 |

== Race calendar ==
The 2011 V8 Utes Series will consist of eight rounds, all of which will be held on the support programme of the V8 Supercar Championship Series.

| Rd. | Race title | Circuit | City / state | Date | Winner |
|---|---|---|---|---|---|
| 1 | (South Australia) Clipsal 500 | Adelaide Street Circuit | Adelaide, South Australia | 17–20 March | David Sieders |
| 2 | (Victoria (state)) Trading Post Perth Challenge | Barbagallo Raceway | Wanneroo, Western Australia | 29 Apr – 1 May | Grant Johnson |
| 3 | (Northern Territory) Skycity Triple Crown | Hidden Valley Raceway | Darwin, Northern Territory | 17–19 June | Kim Jane |
| 4 | (Queensland) Sucrogen Townsville 400 | Townsville Street Circuit | Townsville, Queensland | 8–10 July | Chris Pither |
| 5 | (New South Wales) Supercheap Auto Bathurst 1000 | Mount Panorama Circuit | Bathurst, New South Wales | 6–9 October | Ryal Harris |
| 6 | (Queensland) Armor All Gold Coast 600 | Surfers Paradise Street Circuit | Surfers Paradise, Queensland | 21–23 October | Ryal Harris |
| 7 | (Victoria (state)) Norton 360 Sandown Challenge | Sandown Raceway | Melbourne, Victoria | 18–20 November | Cameron McConville |
| 8 | (New South Wales) Sydney Telstra 500 | Homebush Street Circuit | Sydney, New South Wales | 2–4 December | David Sieders |

== Series Points ==
| Pos | Driver | Points |
|---|---|---|
| 1 | Chris Pither | 935 |
| 2 | David Sieders | 908 |
| 3 | Ryal Harris | 882 |
| 4 | Grant Johnson | 851 |
| 5 | Cameron McConville | 805 |
| 6 | Nathan Pretty | 795 |
| 7 | Kim Jane | 756 |
| 8 | Jack Elsegood | 732 |
| 9 | Ryan Hansford | 703 |
| 10 | Gary Baxter | 700 |
| 11 | Craig Dontas | 696 |
| 12 | Charlie O'Brien | 668 |
| 13 | Andrew Fisher | 654 |
| 14 | Rhys McNally | 589 |
| 15 | Ben Kavich | 493 |
| 16 | Ben Dunn | 481 |
| 17 | Nandi Kiss | 407 |
| 18 | Warren Millett | 389 |
| 19 | Brad Patton | 388 |
| 20 | George Elliot | 357 |
| 21 | Jeremy Grey | 333 |
| 22 | Peter Burnitt | 301 |
| 23 | Greg Willis | 292 |
| 24 | Jason Gomersall | 259 |
| 25 | Jake McNally | 257 |
| 26 | Graham Edwards | 248 |
| 27 | Gary Carson | 245 |
| 28 | Brendon Cook | 202 |
| 29 | Kris Walton | 189 |
| 30 | Rick Gill | 170 |
