= 2009 Australian V8 Ute Racing Series =

2009 V8 Ute Racing Series

Seasons
- ← 2008 2010 →

The 2009 Yokohama V8 Ute Racing Series was a motor racing series for Ford Falcon and Holden Utility Trucks built and conforming to V8 Utes series regulations and those holding valid licence to compete as issued by series organisers Spherix and Australian V8 Ute Racing Pty. Ltd. The series formed the ninth running of a national series for V8 Utes in Australia. The series began on 19 March 2009 at the Adelaide Street Circuit and ended on 6 December at the Homebush Street Circuit after 24 races, although one was declared a 'no-race'.

Former Rugby League footballer Jack Elsegood, driving a Ford Falcon XR8 Ute prepared by Wilson Brothers Racing, won his first national series.

== Teams and drivers ==
The following drivers competed in the 2009 Australian V8 Ute Racing Series. The series comprised fifteen races, at five race meetings, held in three states.

| Team | Car | No | Driver |
|---|---|---|---|
| Crambrook Racing | Ford BF Falcon XR8 Ute | 1 | Layton Crambrook |
| Howard Racing | Ford BF Falcon XR8 Ute | 2 | Stephen Robinson |
| Sage Automation Racing | Holden VE Ute SS | 3 | Gary Baxter |
| Big Gun Racing | Ford BF Falcon XR8 Ute | 4 | Peter Burnitt |
| Big Gun Racing | Ford BF Falcon XR8 Ute | 14 | Brad Patton |
| Big Gun Racing | Ford BF Falcon XR8 Ute | 16 | Rohan Barry |
| Madashell Motorsport | Ford BF Falcon XR8 Ute | 5 | Justin van Twest; Steve McFadden |
| Miedecke Motorsport | Ford BF Falcon XR8 Ute | 7 | George Miedecke |
| SEW – Eurodrive Racing | Ford BF Falcon XR8 Ute | 8 | Noel Edge |
| Jesus. All about life Racing | Ford BF Falcon XR8 Ute | 9 | Andrew Fisher |
| Wilson Brothers Racing | Ford BF Falcon XR8 Ute | 11 | Jack Elsegood |
| Wilson Brothers Racing | Holden VE Ute SS | 32 | Kurt Wimmer |
| Wilson Brothers Racing | Holden VE Ute SS | 85 | Ray Sidebottom; Cameron Wilson; Allan Letcher |
| West Coast Racing | Holden VE Ute SS | 12 | Glen McNally |
| Wollongong Performance Racing | Holden VE Ute SS | 13 | Gary Carson |
| Scott Jennings Motorsport | Holden VE Ute SS | 16 | Brendon Tucker; Michael Kavich; David Turner; Martin Miller |
| Scott Jennings Motorsport | Holden VE Ute SS | 18 | Scott Jennings |
| B.V.C. Racing | Ford BF Falcon XR8 Ute | 17 | Robert Jarvis |
| Nandi Kiss Racing | Holden VE Ute SS | 24 | Nandi Kiss |
| Brock Race Engineering | Holden VE Ute SS | 25 | Paul Williams |
| Workhorse Racing | Ford BF Falcon XR8 Ute | 26 | Ben Kavich |
| Kim Jane Racing | Holden VE Ute SS | 27 | Kim Jane |
| Denis Cribbin Racing | Ford BF Falcon XR8 Ute | 33 | Denis Cribbin |
| Iseek Racing | Ford BF Falcon XR8 Ute | 37 | Jason Gomersall |
| Kim Jane Racing | Holden VE Ute SS | 41 | Yanis Derums; Gary MacDonald |
| ISRI Truck Seats Racing | Holden VE Ute SS | 43 | Steve Hodges |
| Grove Juice Racing | Ford BF Falcon XR8 Ute | 44 | Greg Willis |
| Grove Juice Racing | Holden VE Ute SS | 47 | Grant Johnson |
| Vittoria Coffee Racing | Holden VE Ute SS | 55 | George Elliott; Marshall Brewer |
| CAMCO Group Racing | Holden VE Ute SS | 58 | Ryal Harris; Michael Hannan |
| Wake-Up Racing | Holden VE Ute SS | 65 | Matthew Holt |
| Wake-Up Racing | Holden VE Ute SS | 88 | Warren Millett |
| RED Racing | Holden VE Ute SS | 69 | Charlie Kovacs |
| Dunn Motorsport | Ford BF Falcon XR8 Ute | 98 | Colin Dunn |
| Dunn Motorsport | Ford BF Falcon XR8 Ute | 99 | Ben Dunn; Colin Dunn |

== Results and standings ==
=== Race calendar ===
The 2009 V8 Utes Series consisted of eight rounds, all of which were held on the support programme of the V8 Supercar Championship Series.

| Rd. | Race title | Circuit | City / state | Date | Winner |
|---|---|---|---|---|---|
| 1 | (South Australia) Clipsal 500 | Adelaide Street Circuit | Adelaide, South Australia | 19–22 March | Gary Baxter |
| 2 | (Victoria (state)) Winton Motor Raceway | Winton Motor Raceway | Benalla, Victoria | 2–3 May | Jack Elsegood |
| 3 | Falken Tasmania Challenge | Symmons Plains Raceway | Launceston, Tasmania | 30–31 May | Layton Crambrook |
| 4 | (Northern Territory) Skycity Triple Crown | Hidden Valley Raceway | Darwin, Northern Territory | 20–21 June | Layton Crambrook |
| 5 | (Queensland) Dunlop Townsville 400 | Townsville Street Circuit | Townsville, Queensland | 11–12 July | Layton Crambrook |
| 6 | (Victoria (state)) Norton 360 Sandown Challenge | Sandown Raceway | Melbourne, Victoria | 1–2 August | Kim Jane |
| 7 | (New South Wales) Supercheap Auto Bathurst 1000 | Mount Panorama Circuit | Bathurst, New South Wales | 9–11 October | Gary MacDonald |
| 8 | (New South Wales) Sydney 500 | Homebush Street Circuit | Sydney, New South Wales | 4–6 December | George Miedecke |

=== Drivers' points ===
The V8 Utes series is rare, in that qualifying carries as many points as each of the three races that occur for each round.

| Pos | Driver | ADE | | | | WIN | | | | SYM | | | | HID | | | | TOW | | | | SAN | | | | BAT | | | | HOM | | | | Pts |
| Pos | Driver | Q | R1 | R2 | R3 | Q | R1 | R2 | R3 | Q | R1 | R2 | R3 | Q | R1 | R2 | R3 | Q | R1 | R2 | R3 | Q | R1 | R2 | R3 | Q | R1 | R2 | R3 | Q | R1 | R2 | R3 | Pts |
|---|---|---|---|---|---|---|---|---|---|---|---|---|---|---|---|---|---|---|---|---|---|---|---|---|---|---|---|---|---|---|---|---|---|---|
| 1 | Jack Elsegood | 5th | 3rd | 9th | 4th | 1st | 1st | 7th | 1st | 4th | 2nd | 23rd | 6th | 8th | 6th | 5th | 5th | 1st | 5th | 7th | 2nd | 5th | 5th | | 23rd | 3rd | 3rd | 26th | 9th | 4th | 4th | 16th | 5th | 837 |
| 2 | Grant Johnson | 2nd | 2nd | Ret | DNS | 6th | 5th | 10th | 3rd | 7th | 6th | 6th | 4th | 1st | 1st | 6th | 3rd | 6th | 3rd | 8th | 4th | 2nd | 14th | | 24th | 2nd | 1st | 6th | Ret | 5th | 7th | 5th | 2nd | 808 |
| 3 | George Miedecke | 3rd | 4th | 8th | 5th | 2nd | 3rd | 17th | 7th | 6th | 5th | 22nd | 10th | 4th | 4th | 13th | 8th | 2nd | 1st | Ret | DNS | 3rd | 2nd | | Ret | 1st | 2nd | 5th | 5th | 1st | 1st | 10th | 1st | 805 |
| 4 | Kim Jane | 9th | 7th | 2nd | 3rd | 11th | 11th | 8th | 5th | 8th | 8th | Ret | 12th | 11th | 7th | 7th | 15th | 5th | 6th | 26th | 8th | 9th | 7th | | 1st | 8th | 8th | 1st | 2nd | 6th | 5th | 6th | 11th | 791 |
| 5 | Layton Crambrook | 7th | Ret | Ret | 10th | 5th | 6th | 2nd | 2nd | 1st | 1st | 9th | 1st | 5th | 8th | 1st | 2nd | 4th | 2nd | 9th | 1st | 1st | 3rd | | 15th | DSQ | Ret | DSQ | DSQ | 2nd | 2nd | 9th | 25th | 732 |
| 6 | Andrew Fisher | 6th | 6th | 10th | 11th | 3rd | 4th | Ret | DNS | 5th | 4th | 3rd | 2nd | 9th | 11th | Ret | 13th | 11th | 14th | Ret | 12th | 7th | 29th | | 8th | 6th | 5th | 8th | 6th | 3rd | 3rd | 11th | 3rd | 694 |
| 7 | Glen McNally | 13th | 14th | 4th | 12th | 18th | 15th | 1st | 8th | 10th | 9th | 24th | 11th | 6th | 5th | 2nd | 12th | 8th | 7th | 5th | 6th | 6th | 4th | | DNS | 10th | 10th | 7th | 7th | 18th | Ret | 20th | 22nd | 685 |
| 8 | Craig Dontas | 8th | 5th | 12th | 6th | 13th | Ret | 21st | 15th | 3rd | 7th | 25th | 7th | 13th | 13th | 14th | 9th | 10th | 13th | 4th | 16th | 8th | 15th | | 4th | 4th | 6th | 9th | 3rd | 9th | 9th | 4th | Ret | 685 |
| 9 | Charlie Kovacs | 14th | 9th | 6th | 7th | 24th | 16th | 3rd | 9th | 20th | 14th | 2nd | Ret | 3rd | 3rd | 8th | 4th | 23rd | 15th | 12th | 9th | 13th | 9th | | Ret | 12th | 11th | 17th | Ret | 17th | 15th | 2nd | 4th | 648 |
| 10 | Kurt Wimmer | 4th | Ret | 11th | 8th | 25th | DNS | DNS | DNS | 13th | 10th | 1st | 5th | 15th | 10th | 9th | 6th | 12th | 9th | 2nd | 7th | 10th | 6th | | 2nd | 11th | 9th | 4th | Ret | 11th | Ret | 24th | 7th | 620 |
| 11 | Ryal Harris | 10th | 10th | 1st | 1st | 8th | 7th | 6th | 22nd | 28th | 19th | 7th | 13th | | | | | 13th | 8th | 1st | 5th | 14th | 8th | | 3rd | 14th | 14th | 3rd | 4th | 25th | Ret | 21st | Ret | 589 |
| 12 | Stephen Robinson | 19th | 12th | 5th | 9th | 10th | 9th | 12th | 10th | 2nd | 3rd | 8th | 3rd | 12th | 12th | 10th | 7th | 9th | 11th | 6th | 10th | 11th | 12th | | DNS | DSQ | 20th | 28th | DNS | | | | | 555 |
| 13 | Brad Patton | 27th | Ret | 17th | 17th | 14th | 14th | 11th | 11th | 9th | 28th | 13th | 19th | 19th | 18th | 15th | 28th | 7th | 10th | 21st | 11th | 12th | 11th | | 5th | 15th | 13th | 12th | 20th | 8th | 8th | 29th | DNS | 524 |
| 14 | Steve Hodges | 16th | 11th | 16th | 24th | 27th | 22nd | 19th | 24th | 25th | 21st | 14th | 18th | 16th | 14th | 12th | 11th | 21st | 18th | 13th | Ret | 21st | 17th | | 11th | 18th | 16th | 14th | 11th | 20th | 16th | 1st | 9th | 514 |
| 15 | Robert Jarvis | 12th | 26th | 27th | 23rd | 16th | 13th | 4th | 18th | 12th | 15th | 5th | 9th | 25th | Ret | 17th | 20th | 17th | 21st | 14th | 13th | 15th | 24th | | 13th | 20th | 18th | 18th | 16th | 14th | 12th | 7th | Ret | 503 |
| 16 | Scott Jennings | 22nd | Ret | 28th | 27th | 21st | 20th | 23rd | 14th | 23rd | 22nd | 11th | Ret | 7th | 9th | Ret | 10th | 14th | 12th | 11th | 23rd | 20th | 22nd | | 10th | 19th | 15th | 10th | 12th | 16th | 13th | 12th | 10th | 479 |
| 17 | Ben Kavich | 15th | 21st | 20th | 19th | 19th | 19th | 18th | 17th | 14th | 11th | Ret | 15th | 17th | 15th | 11th | 14th | 29th | 23rd | DNS | 14th | 18th | 16th | | 6th | 9th | Ret | DNS | DNS | 13th | 11th | Ret | 12th | 461 |
| 18 | Gary Baxter | 1st | 1st | 7th | 2nd | 4th | 2nd | 9th | 4th | 16th | Ret | 27th | 16th | 2nd | 2nd | 4th | 1st | 3rd | 4th | 10th | 3rd | 4th | 1st | | Ret | 5th | 4th | 11th | 8th | 10th | Ret | 23rd | 6th | 454 |
| 19 | Nandi Kiss | 11th | 8th | Ret | 28th | 17th | 18th | 16th | 20th | 24th | 17th | 12th | 21st | 10th | Ret | 22nd | 29th | 16th | 19th | 24th | Ret | 16th | 10th | | 7th | 30th | 24th | Ret | 21st | 19th | 14th | 3rd | 8th | 436 |
| 20 | Paul Williams | 17th | 18th | 15th | 14th | 20th | 17th | 14th | 13th | 19th | Ret | 18th | 20th | 20th | 19th | 25th | 18th | 18th | 16th | Ret | 15th | 22nd | 28th | | 16th | 26th | 19th | 16th | 13th | 24th | Ret | 25th | 13th | 415 |
| 21 | Gary Carson | 26th | 22nd | 23rd | 20th | 9th | 12th | 15th | 12th | 18th | 20th | 10th | 17th | 27th | 23rd | 20th | 19th | 23rd | Ret | DNS | DNS | 24th | 13th | | 17th | 21st | 25th | 19th | 18th | 15th | Ret | 26th | 15th | 390 |
| 22 | Yanis Derums | 23rd | 19th | 22nd | 18th | 12th | 10th | 5th | 6th | 22nd | 16th | Ret | 24th | 14th | 16th | 3rd | 17th | 20th | 17th | 15th | 24th | 17th | 18th | | 9th | | | | | | | | | 389 |
| 23 | Justin van Twest | 18th | 13th | 14th | 29th | 15th | Ret | 22nd | 19th | 11th | 12th | 19th | 14th | 23rd | 17th | 16th | 16th | 15th | Ret | DNS | DNS | 23rd | 19th | | 14th | 16th | 17th | 27th | Ret | | | | | 345 |
| 24 | Ben Dunn | | | | | 7th | 8th | 13th | 21st | 15th | 13th | 4th | 8th | | | | | 19th | 22nd | 18th | Ret | | | | | 17th | 12th | 15th | 15th | 12th | 10th | 30th | Ret | 338 |
| 25 | Greg Willis | 21st | 16th | 13th | 15th | 26th | 24th | 25th | 23rd | 30th | 23rd | 17th | 22nd | 26th | 27th | Ret | DNS | 28th | 24th | 17th | 21st | 26th | 27th | | 19th | 25th | 22nd | 22nd | 19th | 28th | 21st | 18th | 18th | 322 |
| 26 | Peter Burnitt | 31st | 23rd | 24th | 21st | 30th | 25th | 27th | 25th | 31st | 26th | 21st | 27th | 29th | 25th | 28th | 26th | 31st | 25th | 16th | Ret | 30th | 23rd | | 20th | 27th | 23rd | 25th | 17th | 23rd | 18th | 14th | 20th | 268 |
| 27 | Jason Gomersall | 29th | DSQ | 26th | 26th | 28th | 26th | Ret | DNS | 17th | 27th | 20th | 25th | DNQ | 28th | 24th | 25th | 24th | 27th | 25th | 19th | 19th | DNS | | DNS | 22nd | 28th | 23rd | Ret | 21st | 17th | 13th | 23rd | 240 |
| 28 | Warren Millett | 24th | 17th | 19th | 25th | | | | | | | | | 28th | 24th | 21st | 22nd | 26th | Ret | 19th | 18th | 27th | 25th | | 21st | 24th | 27th | 21st | 14th | 29th | 23rd | 28th | 21st | 232 |
| 29 | George Elliott | 25th | 20th | 18th | 16th | 29th | 23rd | Ret | DNS | 27th | 25th | 16th | 23rd | 18th | 22nd | 26th | Ret | 27th | 20th | 22nd | 22nd | 25th | 21st | | 18th | | | | | | | | | 226 |
| 30 | Gary MacDonald | | | | | | | | | | | | | | | | | | | | | | | | | 7th | 7th | 2nd | 1st | 7th | 6th | 8th | Ret | 204 |
| 31 | Colin Dunn | 20th | 15th | 3rd | 13th | | | | | | | | | 24th | 26th | 19th | 21st | | | | | DNQ | Ret | | 22nd | | | | | 22nd | 20th | 17th | 19th | 193 |
| 32 | Noel Edge | 28th | 24th | 21st | DNS | | | | | 29th | Ret | 26th | 26th | 31st | Ret | 23rd | 27th | 30th | Ret | 23rd | 20th | 29th | 26th | | Ret | 29th | 26th | 24th | 23rd | 31st | 24th | 22nd | 17th | 176 |
| 33 | Matthew Holt | | | | | 22nd | 21st | 20th | 16th | 21st | DNS | 15th | Ret | | | | | | | | | | | | | | | | | 27th | 19th | 15th | 16th | 150 |
| 34 | Marshall Brewer | | | | | | | | | | | | | | | | | | | | | | | | | 23rd | 21st | 13th | 10th | | | | | 65 |
| 35 | Denis Cribbin | | | | | | | | | | | | | | | | | 25th | 26th | 20th | 17th | | | | | | | | | 32nd | 26th | 27th | Ret | 62 |
| 36 | Allan Letcher | | | | | | | | | | | | | | | | | | | | | 28th | 20th | | 12th | 13th | Ret | DNS | DNS | | | | | 61 |
| 37 | Ray Sidebottom | | | | | 23rd | Ret | 24th | Ret | | | | | 30th | 21st | 27th | 23rd | | | | | | | | | | | | | | | | | 54 |
| 38 | Steve McFadden | | | | | | | | | | | | | | | | | | | | | | | | | | | | | 26th | 22nd | 19th | 14th | 51 |
| 39 | David Turner | | | | | | | | | | | | | 21st | Ret | 18th | 24th | | | | | | | | | | | | | | | | | 39 |
| 40 | Rohan Barry | | | | | | | | | | | | | | | | | | | | | | | | | 28th | 29th | 20th | 22nd | | | | | 33 |
| 41 | Brendon Tucker | 30th | 25th | 25th | 22nd | | | | | | | | | | | | | | | | | | | | | | | | | | | | | 30 |
| 42 | Michael Hannan | | | | | | | | | | | | | 22nd | 20th | Ret | Ret | | | | | | | | | | | | | | | | | 26 |
| 43 | Michael Kavich | | | | | 31st | 27th | 26th | 26th | | | | | | | | | | | | | | | | | | | | | | | | | 22 |
| 43 | Martin Miller | | | | | | | | | | | | | | | | | | | | | | | | | | | | | 30th | 25th | 31st | 24th | 22 |
| 45 | Cameron Wilson | | | | | | | | | 26th | 24th | DNS | DNS | | | | | | | | | | | | | | | | | | | | | 16 |

| Colour | Result |
|---|---|
| Gold | Winner |
| Silver | Second place |
| Bronze | Third place |
| Green | Points classification |
| Blue | Non-points classification |
| Blue | Non-classified finish (NC) |
| Purple | Retired, not classified (Ret) |
| Red | Did not qualify (DNQ) |
| Red | Did not pre-qualify (DNPQ) |
| Black | Disqualified (DSQ) |
| White | Did not start (DNS) |
| White | Withdrew (WD) |
| White | Race cancelled (C) |
| Blank | Did not practice (DNP) |
| Blank | Did not arrive (DNA) |
| Blank | Excluded (EX) |
