= V8 Ute Racing Series =

Australian motor racing series

- Category: Pickup truck racing
- Country: Australia and New Zealand
- Inaugural season: 2001
- Folded: 2017
- Constructors: Ford Australia; Holden
- Engine suppliers: Ford and Holden
- Tyre suppliers: Yokohama
- Last Drivers' champion: Kim Jane
- Official website: V8 Utes Australia

The V8 Ute Racing Series, known originally as the V8 BRute Utes was an Australian motor racing series for utilities, derived from the Australian Production Car Championship. It was conceived in 2000 by PROCAR chief and owner Ross Palmer, V8 Ute Patron Ian McAlister and Procar employee Craig Denyer and launched March 2001, as V8 Brute Utes, at the Clipsal 500 in Adelaide. The series was instantly popular, in part because of aggressive driving style of competitors, a style encouraged by the use of reverse grid racing, but also because of its very fan friendly marketing which included gimmicks like referring to each of its drivers by a nickname.

For most, V8 Utes Racing Series entry was via a franchise, which had been limited to 32 in number, 16 specifically to be Ford Falcon (Australia) XR8 Utes, 16 Holden Utes. All the rounds were shared with Supercars Championship, Australia's top motorsport championship.

Holden driver Rod Wilson was the inaugural series winner. Sydney's Warren Luff, took back to back victories in 2002 and 2003. Holden again returned to form in 2004 with Damien White taking the series title, before defecting to Ford and taking the title again in 2005 by a narrow margin to Melbourne's Marcus Zukanovic.

Ryal Harris is the series most successful driver, becoming the first three-time series winner in 2015. Luff and White have each won two titles.

The series covered eight rounds at various tracks throughout Australia. The reverse grid racing format was extremely popular with the race fans. Drivers have included former Australian NASCAR champion Kim Jane, actor George Elliot, country music singer Adam Brand, television host Grant Denyer, driving instructor Gary Baxter, former Waratahs and Australian Sevens rugby union player Ben Dunn, former Manly Sea Eagles and Sydney Roosters National Rugby League player Jack Elsegood who was also the 2009 series winner, and former Supercar drivers Cameron McConville and Nathan Pretty.

The Ford Falcon Ute ceased production in 2016, and the Holden Ute ceased production in 2017. As a consequence moves began to wrap the series up at the end of 2016, but the replacement, the SuperUtes Series was not ready for a 2017 launch. SuperUtes, featuring turbo diesel powered dual-cab Utility vehicles, launched in 2018.

The V8 Ute Racing Series was in most part successful given it was professionally managed by Category Management company SPHERIX. A Partnership formed by Bill West and Craig Denyer.

== Series winners ==
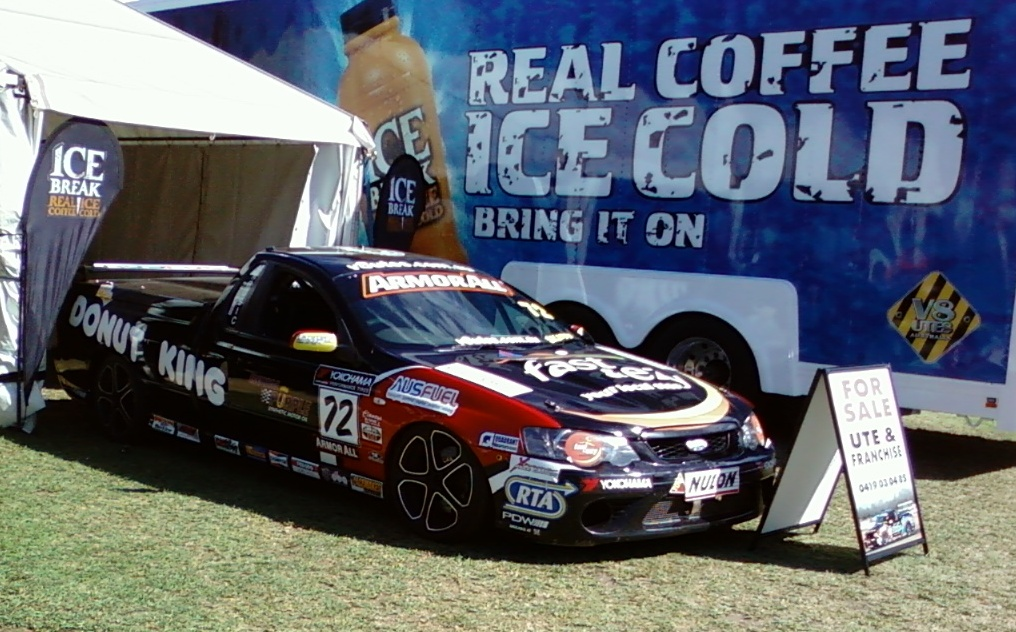
Ford BF Falcon XR8 Ute as driven by Pedro Marusic at the opening round of the 2010 Yokohama V8 Ute Racing Series at the Clipsal 500

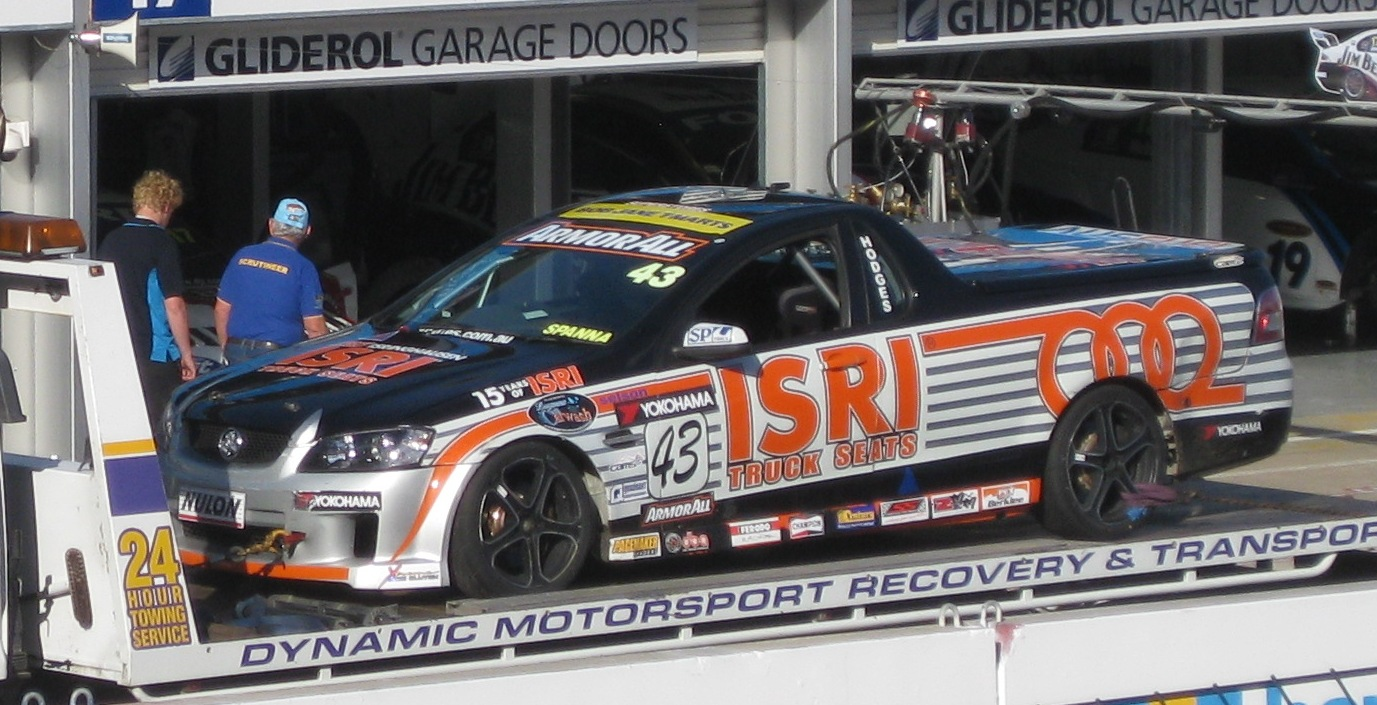
Holden VE SS Ute as driven by Steve Hodges at the opening round of the 2010 Yokohama V8 Ute Racing Series at the Clipsal 500

V8 Ute Racing Series

Year	Winner	Vehicle
2001	Rod Wilson	Holden SS Ute
2002	Warren Luff	Ford Falcon Ute
2003	Warren Luff	Ford Falcon Ute
2004	Damien White	Holden SS Ute
2005	Damien White	Ford Falcon Ute
2006	Marcus Zukanovic	Ford Falcon Ute
2007	Grant Johnson	Holden SS Ute
2008	Layton Crambrook	Ford Falcon Ute
2009	Jack Elsegood	Ford Falcon Ute
2010	Grant Johnson	Holden SS Ute
2011	Chris Pither	Holden SS Ute
2012	Ryal Harris	Ford Falcon Ute
2013	Ryal Harris	Ford Falcon Ute
2014	Kris Walton	Ford Falcon Ute
2015	Ryal Harris	Ford Falcon Ute
2016	David Sieders	Holden SS Ute
2017	Kim Jane	Holden SS Ute

Summer Series

Year	Winner	Vehicle
2004	Grant Denyer	Ford Falcon Ute

== Multiple winners ==
=== Drivers ===
Wins	Driver	Years
3	(Australia) Ryal Harris	2012–2013, 2015
2	(Australia) Grant Johnson	2007, 2010
2	(Australia) Warren Luff	2002–2003
2	(Australia) Damien White	2004–2005

=== Manufacturer ===
Wins	Manufacturer	Years
10	Ford	2002, 2003, 2005, 2006, 2008, 2009, 2012–2015
7	Holden	2001, 2004, 2007, 2010, 2011, 2016, 2017
