= Jack Elsegood =

Australian rugby league footballer

Personal information
- Full name: Barry Francis Elsegood
- Born: 22 December 1973 (age 52) Sydney, New South Wales, Australia

Playing information
- Height: 186 cm (6 ft 1 in)
- Weight: 82 kg (12 st 13 lb)
- Position: Wing
Club
Years	Team	Pld	T	G	FG	P
1993–96	Manly Sea Eagles	72	25	5	0	110
1997–00	Sydney City Roosters	77	35	0	0	140
	Total	149	60	5	0	250
- Relatives: Frank Farrell (grandfather)

Previous series
- 2002–2013: V8 Ute Racing Series

Championship titles
- 2009: Australian V8 Utes
- Statistics up to date as of 24 December 2015.

Barry Francis "Jack" Elsegood (born 22 December 1973 in Sydney, Australia), is an Australian former professional rugby league footballer and former race driver.

== Rugby League ==
=== Manly Warringah Sea Eagles ===
A Manly Warringah Sea Eagles junior and an Australian Schoolboys representative in 1991, Elsegood made his first grade debut for the Sea Eagles in the opening round of the 1993 against local rivals North Sydney. 1993 was actually to be Elsegood's best individual season at Manly. He played 22 games, scored 12 tries (including a memorable length of the field try in Manly's 36–10 minor semi-final loss to Brisbane at the Sydney Football Stadium), as well as winning both the Dally M Rookie of the Year and the Norwich Rising Star awards.

1994 was a down year for Elsegood. A shoulder injury suffered in Manly's successful World Sevens win in the pre-season would hamper him for the season and would eventually require surgery at seasons end. Unfortunately for Elsegood, who before the season was tipped as a bolter for the 1994 Kangaroo tour of Great Britain and France, the injury would also hamper his form and he only crossed for four tries for the year and he was subsequently overlooked for the Kangaroo Tour.

Elsegood would continue to be a regular on the Manly wing in both 1995 and 1996, though he missed Manly's Grand Final loss to the Sydney Bulldogs in 1995 while he sat on an extended bench for Manly's 20–8 win over St George in the 1996 Grand Final but did not get to play on the day.

=== Sydney City Roosters ===
After four years and 72 games for Manly, Elsegood signed with the Sydney City Roosters from 1997. He would go on to play 77 games for the Roosters, crossing for 35 tries.

After 149 games in eight seasons, Elsegood retired from playing rugby league during the 2001 NRL season. He had spent the previous 18 months battling ankle and knee injuries, with his final NRL match being for the Roosters in June 2000 in which he suffered an ankle injury. That injury persisted for the remainder of the 2000 season, causing Elsegood to miss a chance at playing in the 2000 NRL Grand Final.

== Rugby League career highlights ==
- 1991 Australian School Boys
- 1993 Dally M Rookie of the year (Manly)
- 1993 Norwich Rising Star (Manly)
- 1995 ARL Minor Premiers (Manly)
- 1996 ARL Minor Premiers (Manly)
- 1996 ARL Premiers (Manly) †

† Did not play in Grand Final

== Motor racing ==
After retiring from football at the end of the 2000 season, Elsegood moved into property development and was a co-owner of Delmege Residential with future Manly Sea Eagles sponsor/owner Max Delmege. In 2001 he had his first race in an HQ Holden and made his debut in the V8 Ute Racing Series in 2002. He won the Australian V8 Ute Racing Series in 2009 and has been runner up four times (2004, 2006, 2007 and 2010). Jack Elsegood is the grandson of Newtown Jets legendary hardman Frank 'Bumper' Farrell.

At the 2007 WPS Bathurst 12 Hour race held at the famous Mount Panorama Circuit, Elsegood finished ninth outright and 1st in Class D driving a Ford BF Falcon XR8 alongside Chris Delfsma and legendary Australian driver and multiple championship winner across multiple categories including twice winning the Bathurst 1000, John Bowe.

Elsegood also made an appearance in the 2007 rugby league drama film The Final Winter.

In 2009, Elsegood along with Brett Delmege held two seats on the Manly Sea Eagles club board due to Delmege's father Max having a 36% stake in the club. This ended in late-2010 when Max Delmege sold most of his stake in the Sea Eagles to club sponsor, eco-hot water company Quantum.

== Motorsports career results ==
Season	Series	Position	Car	Team / Entrant
2002	Australian V8 BrUte Series	10th	Ford Falcon XR8 Ute	Jack Elsegood Racing
2003	Australian V8 BrUte Series	15th	Ford Falcon XR8 Ute	Jack Elsegood Racing
2004	Australian V8 BrUte Series	2nd	Ford Falcon XR8 Ute	Jack Elsegood Racing
2004	Biante Model Cars Historic Touring Car Series	21st	Ford XY Falcon GT	
2005	Australian V8 BrUte Series	10th	Ford Falcon XR8 Ute	Coopers Racing
2005	Biante Model Cars Historic Touring Car Series	5th	Ford XY Falcon GT	Eric Stanford
2006	Australian V8 Ute Series	2nd	Ford Falcon XR8 Ute	Coopers Racing
2007	Australian V8 Ute Series	2nd	Ford Falcon XR8 Ute	Coopers Racing
2008	Australian V8 Ute Series	4th	Ford Falcon XR8 Ute	Coopers Racing
2009	Australian V8 Ute Series	1st	Ford Falcon XR8 Ute	Coopers Clear Racing
2010	Australian V8 Ute Series	2nd	Ford Falcon XR8 Ute	Coopers Clear Racing
2011	Australian V8 Ute Series	8th	Ford Falcon XR8 Ute	Coopers Clear Racing
2012	Australian V8 Ute Series	17th	Ford Falcon XR8 Ute	Coopers Clear Racing
2013	Australian V8 Ute Series	25th	Ford Falcon XR8 Ute	Fuchs/Hustler Mowers
2016	Australian V8 Ute Series	35th	Ford Falcon XR8 Ute	Domain Residential

=== Endurance racing ===
Year	Race	Car	Qualified	Position	Class
2002	Bathurst 24 Hour	Mitsubishi Mirage RS	31st	12th	4th
2005	Gemini 1 Hour	Holden Gemini Coupe	11th	6th	6th
2006	1000km of Spa	Porsche 911 GT3-RSR	36th	25th	11th
2007	Bathurst 12 Hour	Ford Falcon XR8	11th	9th	1st
2008	Bathurst 12 Hour	Mitsubishi Evo 8	8th	DNF	DNF
2008	Wakefield 300	Ford Falcon XR8 Ute	8th	2nd	1st
2010	Wakefield 300	Ford Falcon XR8 Ute	17th	DNF	DNF
2011	Winton 300	Ford Falcon XR8 Ute	DNQ	DNS	DNS

=== Complete Bathurst 24 Hour results ===
Year	Team	Co-drivers	Car	Class	Laps	Pos.	Class pos.
2002	(Australia) David Borg	(Australia) David Borg (Australia) Allan Shepherd	Mitsubishi Mirage	10	457	12th	4th

=== Complete Bathurst 12 Hour results ===
Year	Team	Co-drivers	Car	Class	Laps	Pos.	Class pos.
2007	(Australia) Century 21	(Australia) John Bowe (Australia) Chris Delfsma	Ford BF Falcon XR8	D	244	9th	1st
2008	(Australia) Coopers / Brock Harcourts	(Australia) Michael Brock (Australia) Garry Young	Mitsubishi Lancer Evo VIII	A	77	DNF	DNF

== Filmography ==
- The Final Winter (2007)

Sporting positions
Preceded by Layton Crambrook	Winner of the Australian V8 Ute Racing Series; 2009	Succeeded by Grant Johnson
Awards and achievements
Preceded by Matthew Rodwell	Dally M Rookie of the Year; 1993	Succeeded by Steve Menzies
