= Armor All =

American brand of car care products

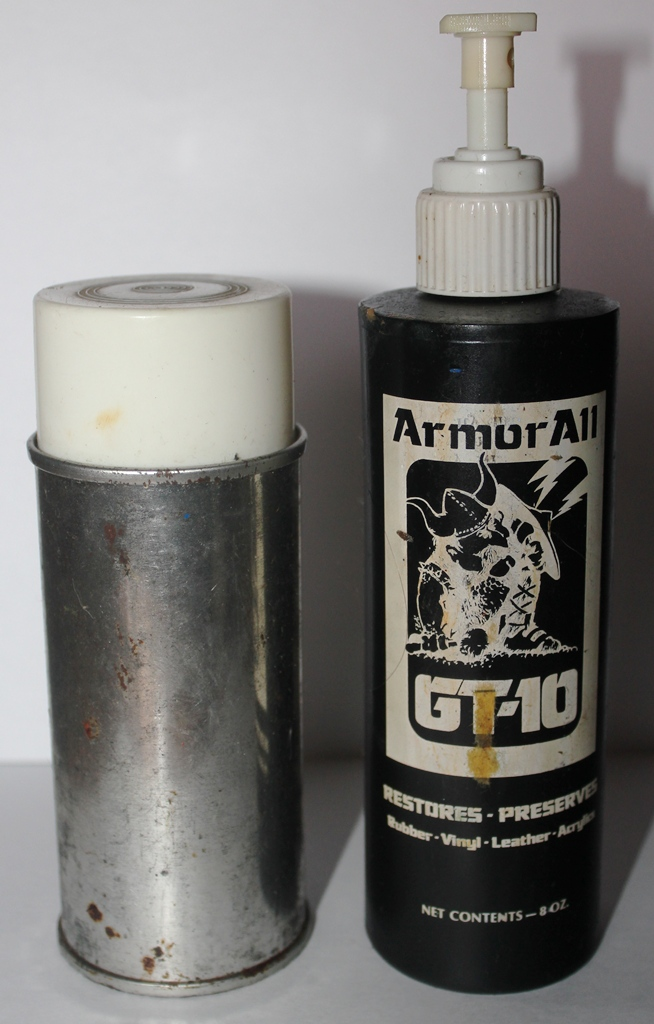
- Bottle of Armor All car cleaner
- Product type: Car care products
- Current owner: Energizer Holdings
- Introduced: 1972; 54 years ago
- Previous owners: Clorox; McKesson Corporation; Spectrum Brands
- Tagline: "Respect your car"
- Website: armorall.com

Armor All is an American brand of car care products that is manufactured by Armored AutoGroup of Danbury, Connecticut, United States. The company markets sprays, gels, liquids, and wipes to clean, shine, and protect interior and exterior automobile surfaces.

According to patent documents, Armor All typically contains water, PDMS (silicone), diethylene glycol, glycerin, and various additional chemical compounds.

== History ==
=== Invention ===
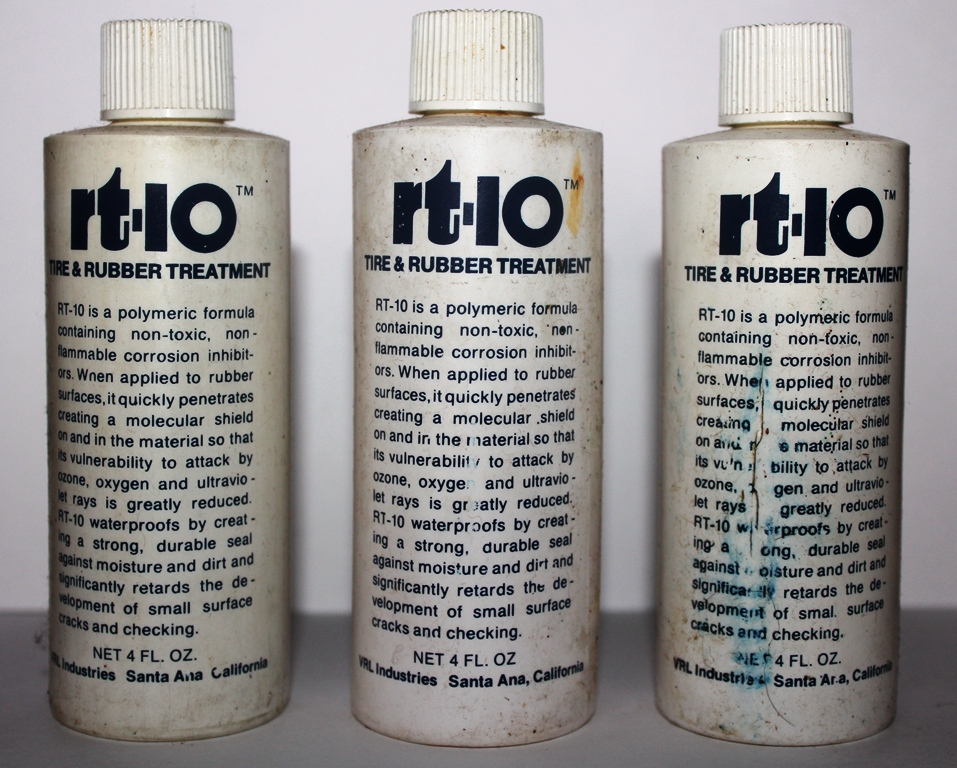
RT-10 Tire and Rubber Treatment

The chemical formula for Armor All was invented by polymer chemist Joe Palcher in 1962. He began selling it in 1966 under the name Trid-on (no dirt spelled backwards). It was initially sold out of a specialty car shop in Southern California and then expanded to the Briggs Cunningham Automotive Museum in Costa Mesa, California and Parnelli Jones tire stores.

It quickly grew in popularity selling through periodicals like Hot Rod Magazine.

Car enthusiast and salesman Alan Rypinski discovered Trid-on in 1972 while trying to restore a 1959 Jaguar. He bought the rights to Trid-on and renamed the product as Armor All Protectant. The first test products were called RT-10 and GT-10. The following year, he launched Very Important Products Inc. to market it, employing regional sales managers who worked out of motor homes and traveled to county fairs, shopping malls, and trade shows. Rypinski made $220,000 in sales the first year. In 1976, he patented Armor All Protectant.

=== Sale to McKesson Corporation ===
In 1979, Rypinski had reached $80 million in sales. He sold Very Important Products and the Armor All brand for $50 million to the San Francisco-based consumer products company McKesson Corporation. Rypinski stayed on as a consultant for the next five years.

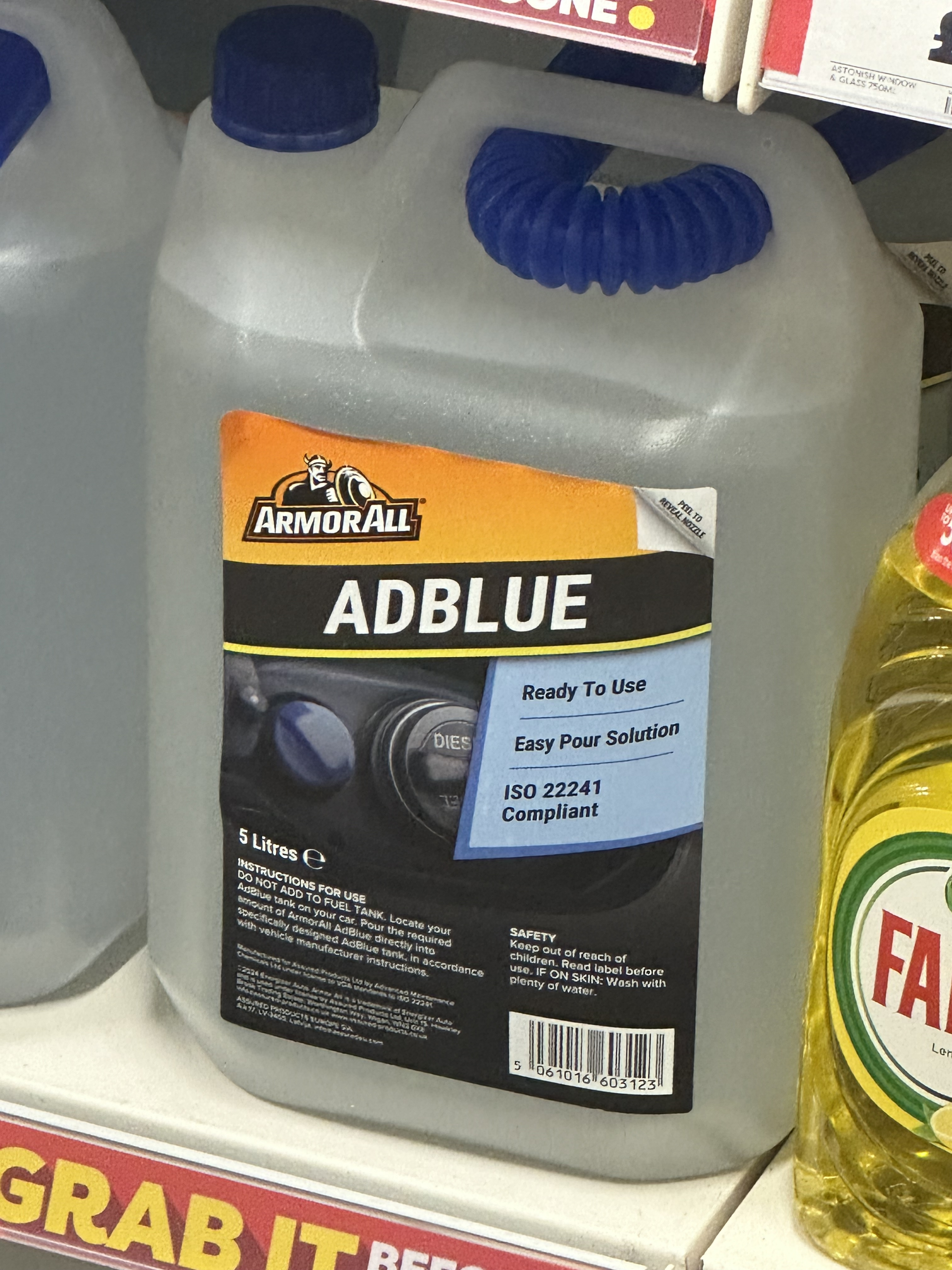
ArmorAll AdBlue

By the 1980s, Armor All controlled over 90% of the market and was being used on everything from cars to briefcases and golf bags. In 1982, Armor All introduced a car wash formula as an alternative to common dish soap and reached $70 million in sales by 1984. New company president Jeffrey Sherman pushed the brand into international markets. Armor All debuted in Japan in 1984 and West Germany in 1985. Domestically, the company attempted to market to women and high school students.

In 1986, the company introduced Clean Start car cleaner and McKesson spun off the brand as Armor All Products, Inc. as part of an initial public offering. McKesson held an 83% stake in the new company. Armor All's sales exceeded $100 million that year.

In 1988, it introduced Armor All Car Wax, entering the car wax space and competing directly with Rain Dance and Turtle Wax. By this time, market research indicated the Protectant was in 25 million U.S. homes, about 33% of all domestic households. It also purchased Borden, Inc.'s car care products line, which included well-known name brands such as Rain Dance, Rally, and No. 7, for $26 million. This acquisition significantly broadened the company's product line and put Armor All in control of 38% of the wash-and-wax market. By 1989, Armor All reached $162 million in sales.

=== Economic hardships of the 1990s ===
By 1990, Armor All began to struggle in the market for multiple reasons. Despite owning over 80% market share, the company was challenged by STP's Son of a Gun offering that captured 10% of the market in less than two years. The Borden acquisition also proved to be a challenge as management was unable to properly adapt to a large corporate structure with significant distribution operations. Long-time president Jeffrey M. Sherman's expansion efforts proved to be more costly than expected. The economic reality of the early 1990s recession also meant that consumers were spending less on the maintenance of their car. The company suffered its first decrease in annual earnings in its history. Sherman resigned in March and the company's stock value fell by 15%.

Net income fell to less than $20 million in 1990 and less than $7 million in 1991. In March 1991, Armor All's nine-month earnings fell sharply to $4.5 million, from $15.1 million during the same period of the previous year. Revenue also declined to $90.7 million from $104.1 million. Analysts believed the company's complacency was to blame and that McKesson should sell the business. Armor All introduced its Tire Foam Protectant in 1992 and Quick Silver Wheel Cleaner soon after. That year, Rypinski rejoined the company as chairman emeritus to help expand into home care products. This led to the purchase of the EZ Deck Wash brand, which was expanded to include products for washing and protecting decks, vinyls, and plastics

By the end of 1995, McKesson reported that Armor All was operating at a loss. Around this time, the company reduced its stock in Armor All to 55%.

The Armor All brand suffered costly setbacks in 1996. The company took an $8 million charge to correct a problem with faulty aerosol cans of its QuickSilver Wheel Cleaner. Following complaints that the EZ Deck Wash caused spotting in some cases, the company was sued by the Orange County District Attorney's Office. Armor All announced in September that it would change the product's label instructions and avoid a lawsuit.

In October 1996, Armor All purchased Car-Rex, a German maker of car appearance products, coolants, air fresheners, and antifreeze, from Werner & Mertz. Car-Rex was merged into its German operations.

=== Clorox ownership ===
In November 1996, Clorox announced its intention to acquire Armor All for $408 million by the end of the year. Included in the sale were two plants, one in Painesville, Ohio and the other in Wales. At this time, Armor All reported $186 million in revenue and led the automotive cleaning products market with a 30% share. The acquisition helped Clorox gain entry into the autocare industry and Australia market, and expanded its market share in Japan.

Nielsen CDG UK was appointed car care distributor for Armor All products by Clorox UK. Nielsen CDG is part of the Convenience Distribution Group supplying petrol (gasoline) stations in the United Kingdom.

Clorox issued a recall of Armor All's wheel cleaner in September 1997, following multiple cases of accidental poisonings and the death of a child. At the time, QuickSilver's active ingredient was ammonium bifluoride, a highly toxic substance. Clorox added to its car care assets in October 1998, when it acquired STP with First Brand Corp. The company's autocare subsidiary came to be known as The Armor All/STP Products Company. In 2000, Armor All Wipes were introduced to the market.

In 2007, Armor All introduced Ultra Shine Wash and Wax, Triple Action Wheel Cleaner, and Natural Finish Detailer Protectant to the market. The company announced in September that it was partnering with Jamak Fabrications to develop Armor All-branded wiper blades.

In 2008, Armor All released a complete line of automotive vacuums. Armor All made $300 million in sales in 2009, about 5% of total revenue for Clorox. This was a 22% decrease from 2005. As a result, Clorox began to explore ways to offload its car care assets as early as 2007.

=== Acquisition by Avista, Spectrum, and Energizer ===
In September 2010, Clorox sold its car-care brands Armor All and STP to Avista Capital Partners, operating it as an independent company. At the time of the purchase, the company employed more than 160 workers, with corporate offices in Danbury, Connecticut and Pleasanton, California; manufacturing facilities in Painesville, Ohio and Wales; and international operations in Canada and Australia. It renamed the business Armored AutoGroup that December.

Armored AutoGroup acquired the A/C PRO, Arctic Freeze, Sub Zero, and Super Seal Stop Leak brands of air conditioning products from Kinderhook Industries in March 2014. By that October, Avista was considering an IPO for the company.

In April 2015, the Armored AutoGroup was acquired by Spectrum Brands. Energizer bought the Spectrum Brands auto care business unit (including Armor All, STP and A/C Pro) in November 2018 for $1.25 billion in cash and stock.

The company introduced Ultra Shine Wash Wipes and Ultra Shine Wax Wipes in 2017, aimed at urban millennials who don't have access to traditional car washing accoutrements. It started selling air fresheners in 2018.

== Sponsorships and ads ==
In the 1970s, Armor All sponsored Neil Bonnett, most notably for his fifth-place finish at the 1976 Daytona 500. In 2005, the brand became a major sponsor of the Supercars Championship and Super2 Series. It holds naming rights to the Armor All Qualifying, Armor All Poll Position Award, and more. From 2010 through 2013, the brand was also the naming rights sponsor for the Gold Coast 600.

In April 2006, the company announced that it would sponsor Busch Series driver Jon Wood. In the same year, Armor All launched a car care website offering tools, advice, and message boards. It also teamed up with Wood for the Detail it Yourself (DIY) Dare car cleaning contest. Armor All DIY Dare II took place in 2007.

After 35 years, Armor All updated its Viking mascot. The original had been designed by illustrator Dave Deal. Under Clorox, the branding was substantially modernized, and its current iteration was introduced in 2007.

In 2008, Armor All sponsored NASCAR driver Tony Stewart and World of Outlaws driver Danny Schatz. Stewart gave the company its first victory when he won the Camping World 300 that year. Serving as a spokesman for the brand, Stewart appeared in television and print ads that year. He appeared in a series of unscripted webisodes in 2009 and a scripted comedy webseries in 2010.

In April 2018, Armor All debuted a new ad campaign with professional wrestler and actor John Cena.

In February 2021, Armor All announced it would sponsor Erik Jones of Richard Petty Motorsports for the 63rd annual Daytona 500. In 2021, Armor All named Formula One driver Jenson Button as its first brand ambassador and announced a partnership with the Red Bull Racing team.

In 2024, Armor All underwent a brand refresh in the Australian market, moving from a black and gold packaging to orange.
