= Ford Falcon (BF) =

Australian full-size car

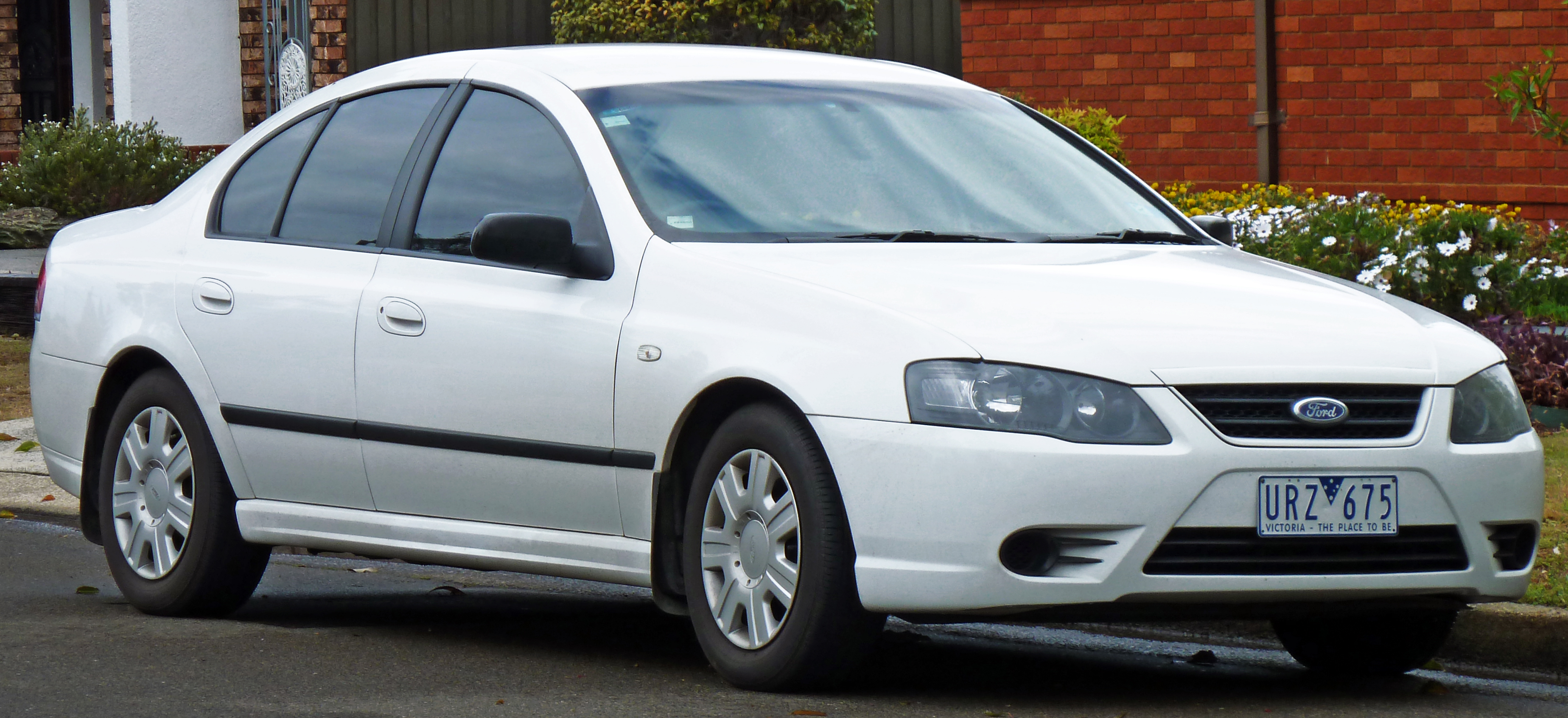

Overview
- Manufacturer: Ford Australia
- Production: October 2005 – February 2008 (utility, sedan); October 2005 – June 2010 (wagon)
- Assembly: Australia: Melbourne, Victoria (Broadmeadows)
- Designer: Graham Wadsworth

Body and chassis
- Class: Full-size car
- Body style: 2-door utility 4-door sedan 5-door station wagon
- Layout: FR layout
- Related: Ford Territory; Ford Fairlane; Ford Fairmont

Powertrain
- Engine: 4.0 L Barra 190 I6 (petrol); 4.0 L Barra 245T I6 T (petrol); 4.0 L Barra E-Gas I6 (LPG); 5.4 L Barra 230 V8 (petrol); 5.4 L Boss 260 V8 (petrol)
- Transmission: 4-speed M93LE automatic (I6); 6-speed 6HP 26 automatic 5-speed manual 6-speed manual

Chronology
- Predecessor: Ford Falcon (BA)
- Successor: Ford Falcon (FG) (sedan, utility)

The Ford Falcon (BF) is a full-size car that was produced by Ford Australia from 2005 to 2008. It was the third and final iteration of the sixth generation of the Falcon. The station wagon body design continued until 2010, alongside the new seventh generation Falcon range.

== Introduction and changes ==
Sold between October 2005 and February 2008 in sedan and utility body styles or as a wagon until June 2010, the BF series brought many mechanical upgrades, including but not limited to a raised compression ratio (10.3:1) and improved now-independent dual variable cam timing on the six-cylinder engines and improved knock sensing on the SOHC 3 Valve V8 engine which, in conjunction with ECU modifications, led to increases in power, torque and fuel economy, required to comply with recently introduced Euro III emissions standards. The changes to the six-cylinder engine further decreased the engine's already low noise and vibration while increasing power from 182 to 190 kW (244 to 255 hp). With the BF, Ford introduced a six-speed automatic transmission developed by German companies ZF and Bosch. The XR6 Turbo got a power increase to 245 kilowatts (329 hp), along with all XR sedans receiving the ZF six-speed automatic as an option. XR6 utes were only fitted with the four-speed.

With the BF Falcon Ford updated the keys and security of the Falcon, replacing the ageing Tibbe lock system with a Huf Hülsbeck & Fürst manufactured twin track German key system.

The original BF Falcon exterior cosmetic changes from the previous model included a split lower grille on the front bumper of non-XR based models, an updated front bumper on XR models, updated jewelled tail lights on sedans, and a new style of alloy wheel on XR models. The interior changes included updated cloth patterning on seats and interior door cards; XR models featured a coloured tyre tread pattern on the cloth sports seats also the BF looked more aggressive.

Powertrains
Engine	Power	Torque	Transmission
4.0 L Barra 190 I6 (petrol)	190 kW (250 hp)	383 N⋅m (282 lb⋅ft)	5-speed Tremec T-5 manual (XT); 6-speed Tremec T-56 manual (XR6); 4-speed BTR M93LE automatic
4.0 L Barra E-Gas I6 (LPG)	156 kW (209 hp)	374 N⋅m (276 lb⋅ft)	5-speed Tremec T-5 manual (XT); 6-speed Tremec T-56 manual (XR6); 4-speed BTR M93LE automatic
4.0 L Barra 245T TI6 (petrol)	245 kW (329 hp)	480 N⋅m (350 lb⋅ft)	6-speed Borg-Warner T-56 manual 6-speed ZF 6HP 26 automatic
5.4 L Barra 230 V8 (petrol)	230 kW (310 hp)	500 N⋅m (370 lb⋅ft)	5-speed Tremec T-5 manual 4-speed BTR M93LE automatic
5.4 L Boss 260 V8 (petrol)	260 kW (350 hp)	500 N⋅m (370 lb⋅ft)	6-speed Borg-Warner T-56 manual 6-speed ZF 6HP 26 automatic

== Model range ==
The BF Falcon started production in October 2005 until it was updated with the Mk II in October 2006.

Its original range comprised the following model variants:

- Falcon XT sedan and wagon (base model)
- Falcon Futura sedan and wagon (added features)
- Falcon XR6, XR6 Turbo, and XR8 sedan and utility (sport range)
- Fairmont and Fairmont Ghia sedan (luxury range)
- Falcon XL, XLS and RTV (utility)

In February 2006, the limited edition Falcon SR was also launched with a higher level of equipment specification relative to the base XT model.

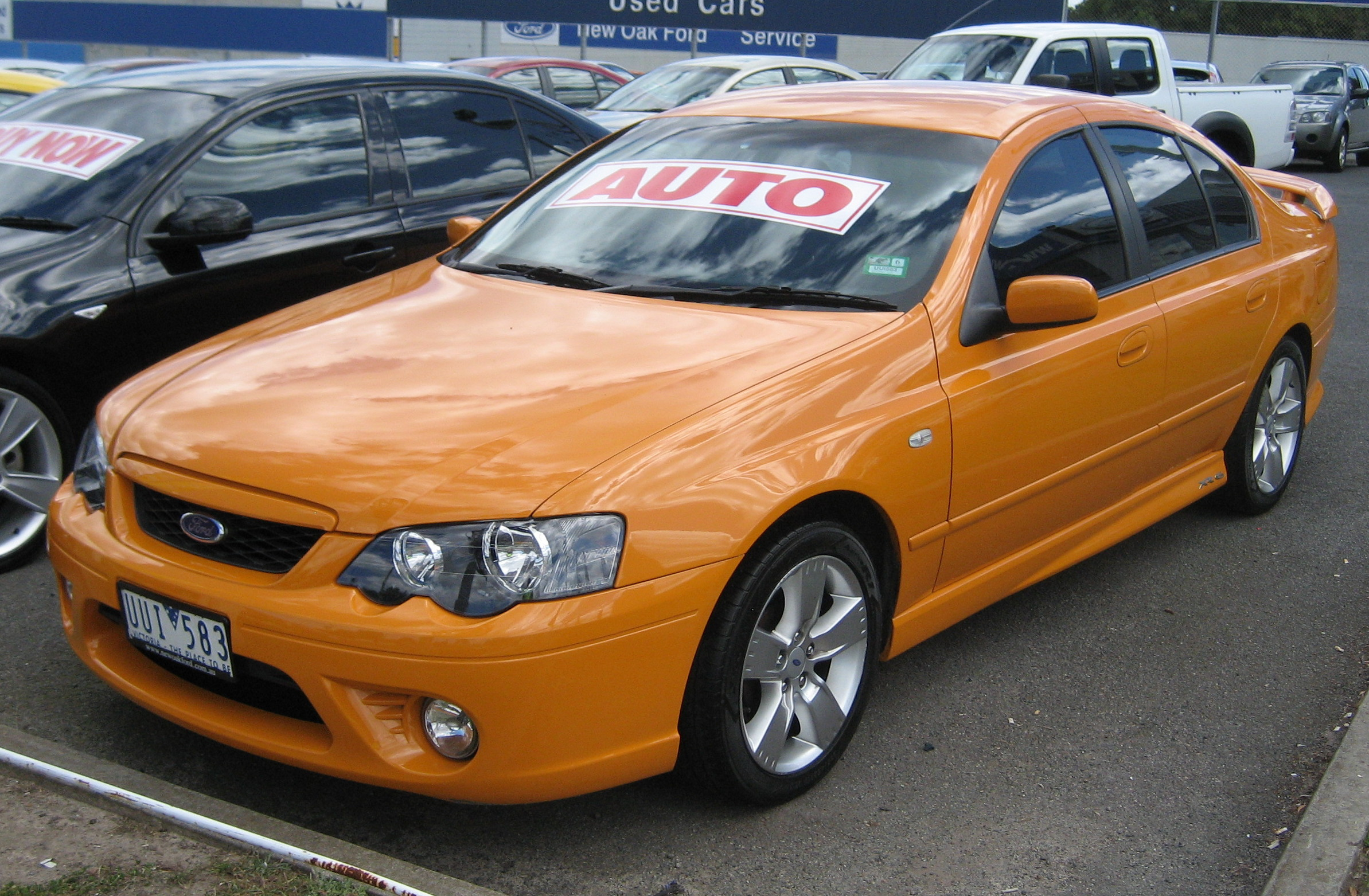
Ford Falcon (BF) XR6 sedan

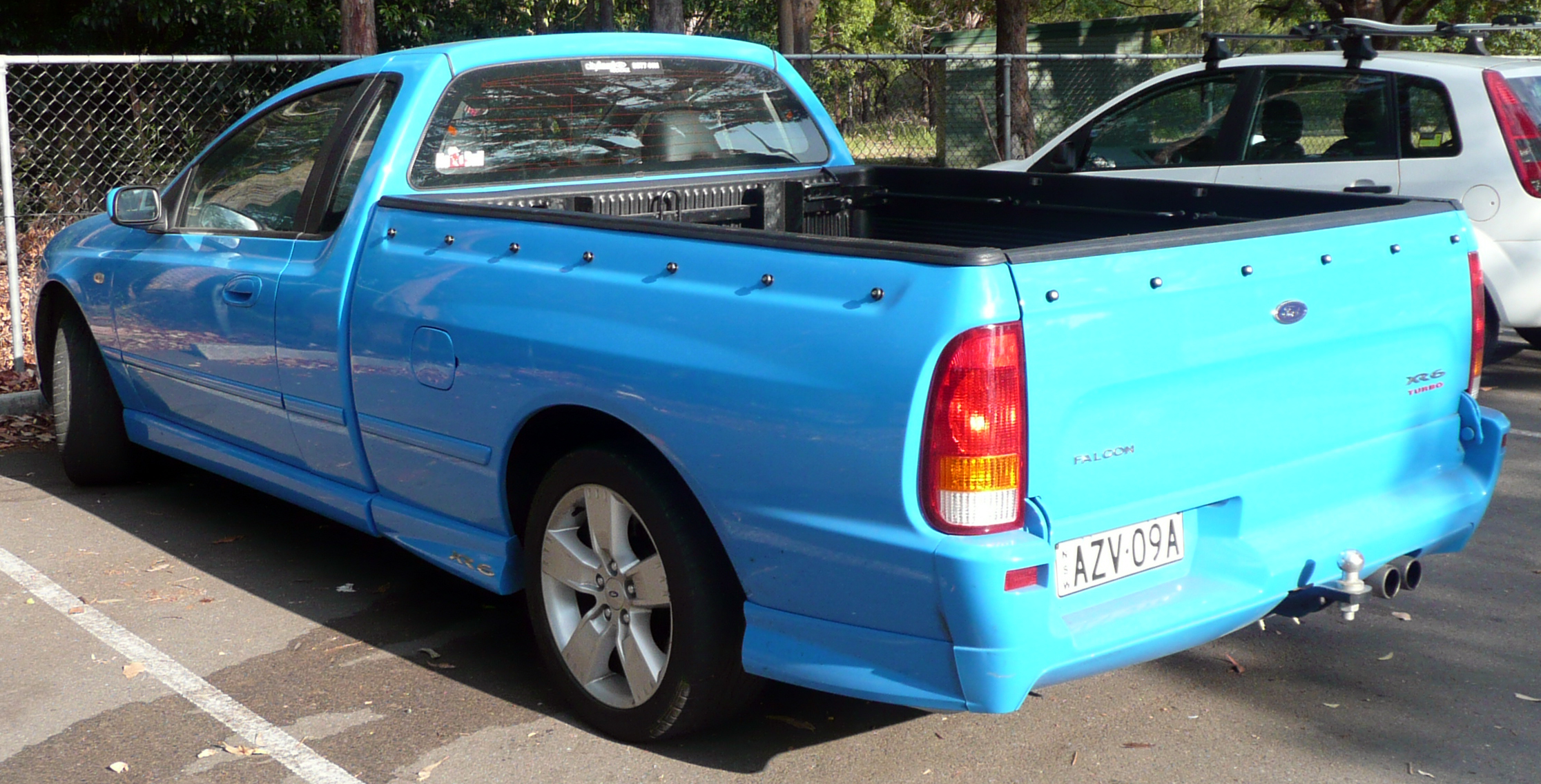
Ford Falcon (BF) XR6 Turbo utility

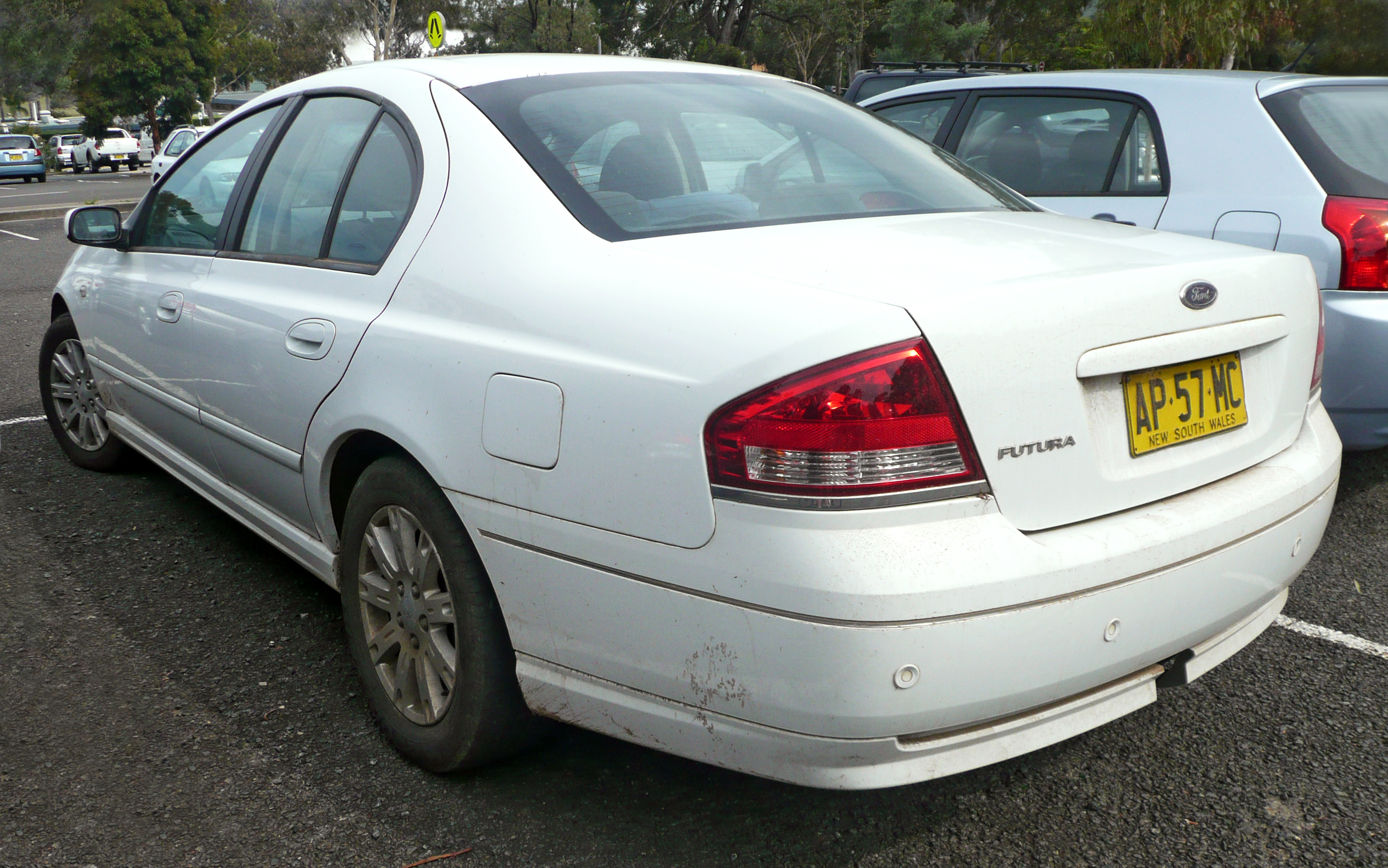
Ford Falcon (BF) Futura sedan

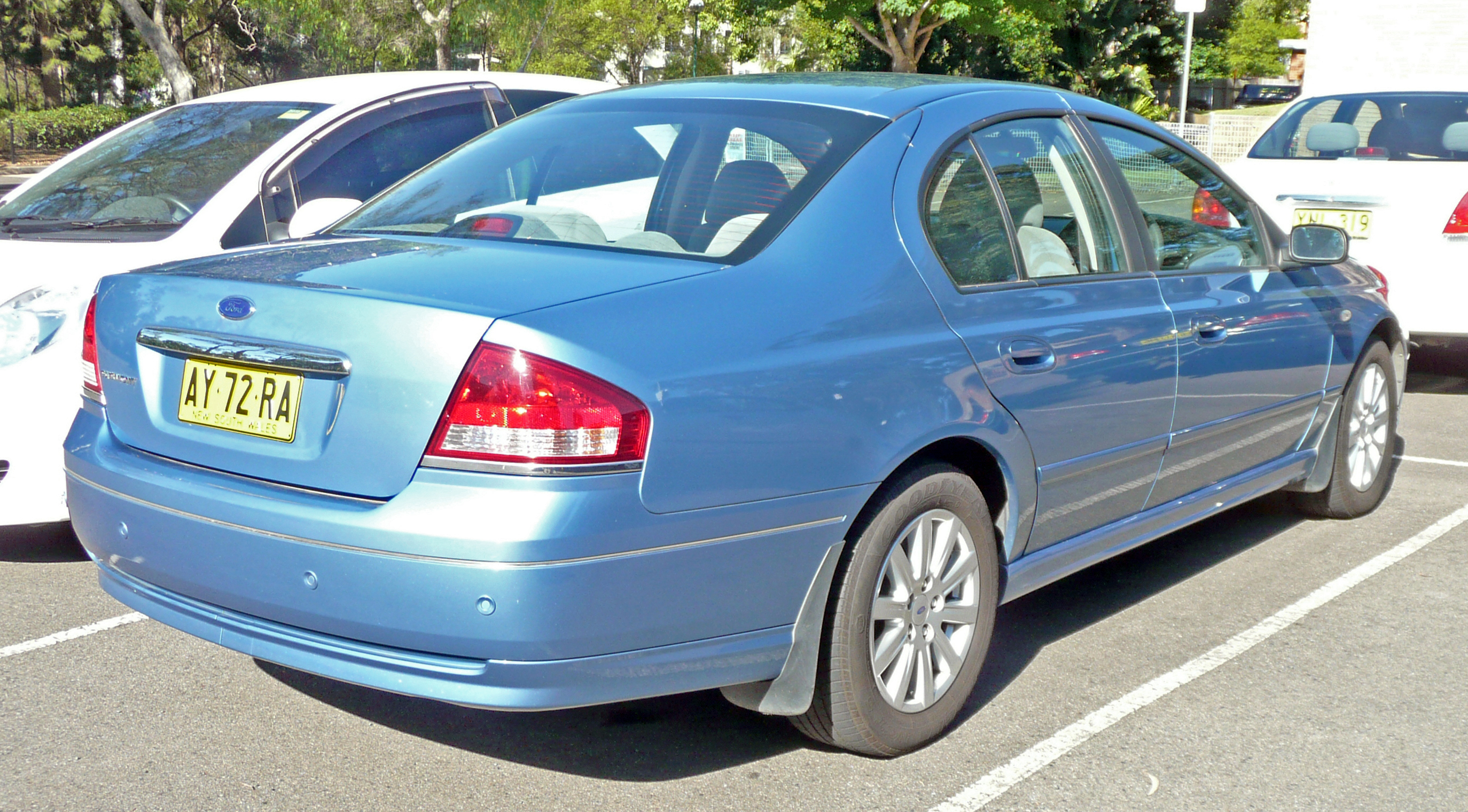
Ford Fairmont (BF) sedan

=== Mk II ===
On 6 October 2006, the BF Mk II was officially launched by former Ford Australia President Tom Gorman. The BF Falcon MkII went on sale on 22 October 2006. The XT, Futura and Fairmont gained a design facelift, with a new bonnet, headlights, grille and front and rear bumpers, while the XR range gained some minor interior updates. The Fairmont Ghia also featured a sportier body kit with side skirts, designed to make the car more attractive to younger buyers. Some vehicles are dated September 2006.

In the final months of production (July 2007 onwards), the XR6, XR6 Turbo and XR8 received a special edition body kit with dark gray inserts on the bumpers and skirts (November 2007 onwards, known as the 'Aggressor' body kit), shadow chrome 18" alloys with dark gray inserts on the spokes, and Premium Sound/Climate Control as standard. In New Zealand the cars with the special edition body kit were known as the 'Rebel' model and had Rebel badging with the Rebel insignia embroidered into the Nappa leather headrests. The NZ Rebel models featured all of the optional upgrades.

The 2007 BF MkII Model also saw the introduction of the limited edition "Ripcurl Ute" with Ford sponsoring the 35th Anniversary of the Ripcurl Pro event at Bells Beach Victoria. The model had a number of limited edition upgrades such as Ripcurl badging, wetsuit material seatcovers with Ripcurl insignia, premium sound system, extended cab, sports suspension, 18 inch wheels, unique "breeze" paint code in aqua blue/green and body kit. These were presented in both the XR6 and XR8 models.

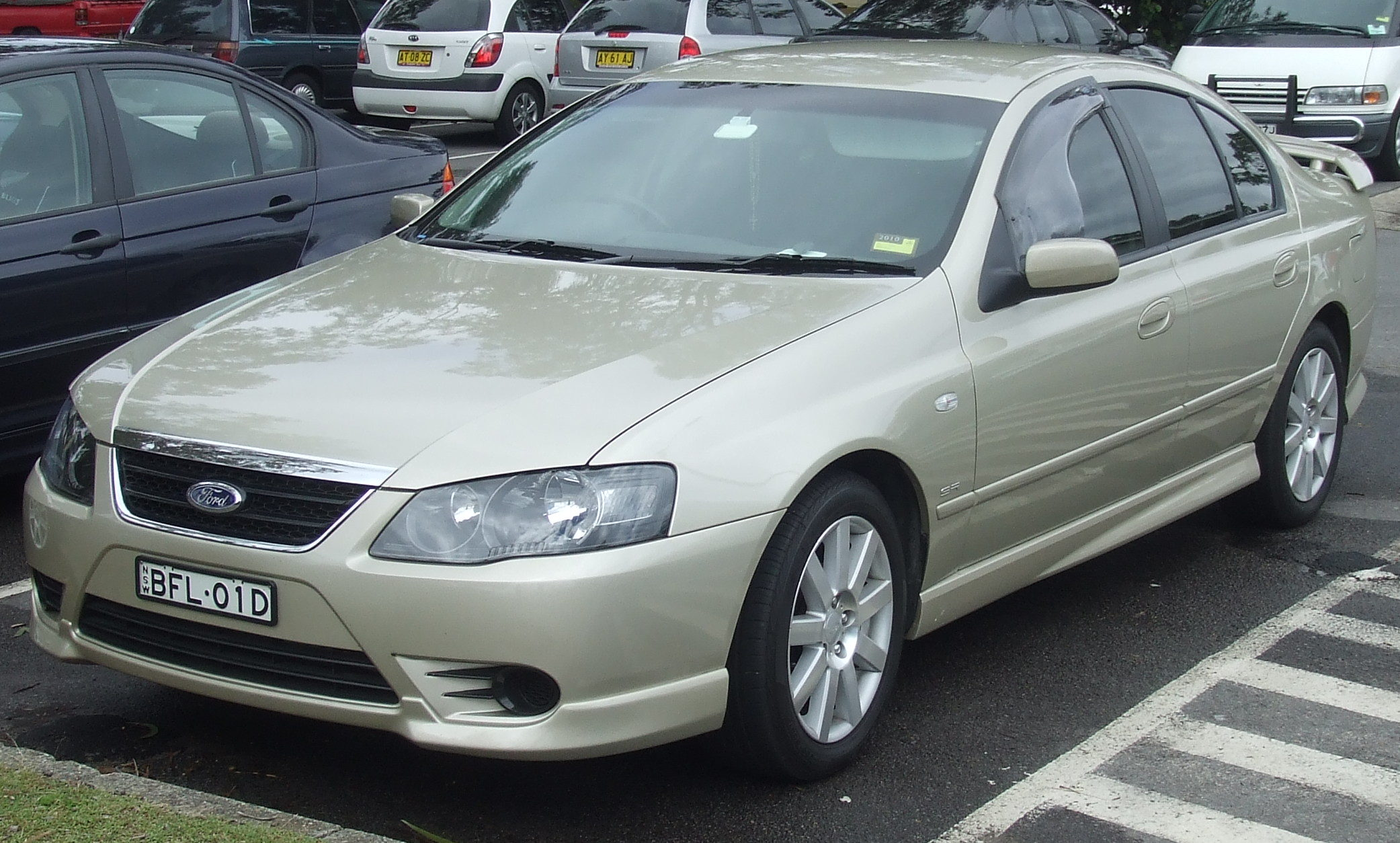
Ford Falcon (BF II) SR sedan

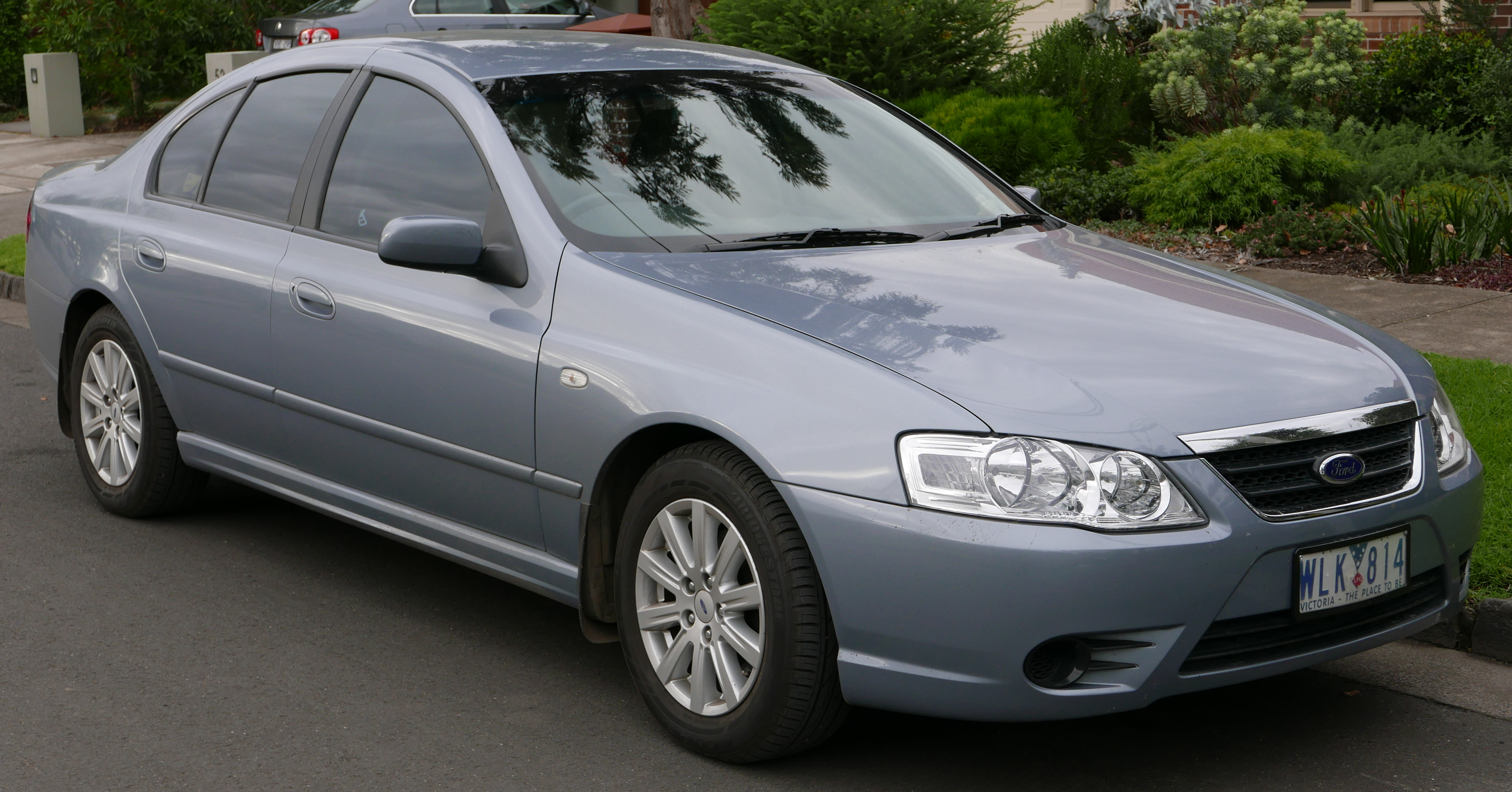
Ford Fairmont (BF II) sedan

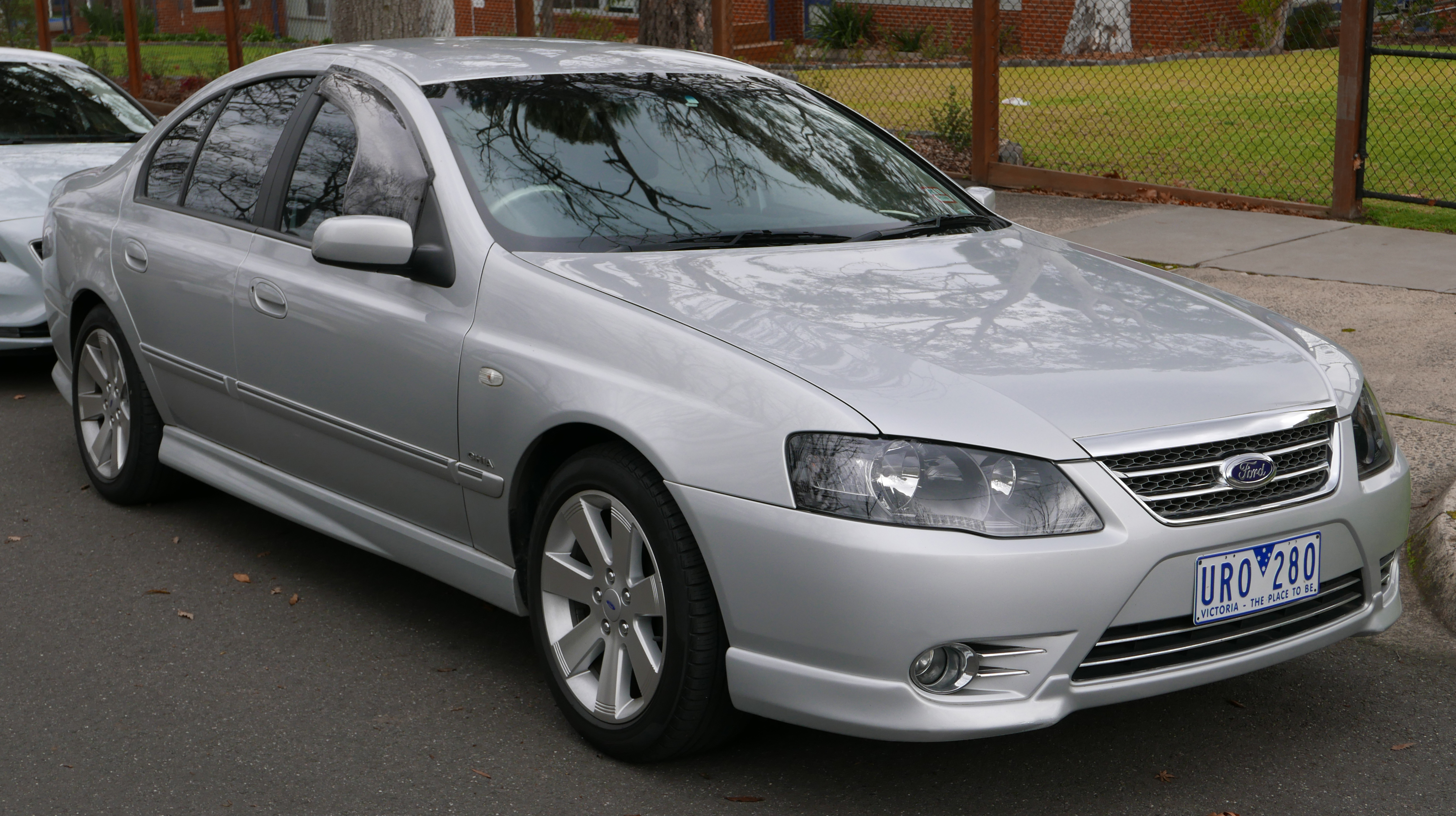
Ford Fairmont Ghia (BF II) sedan

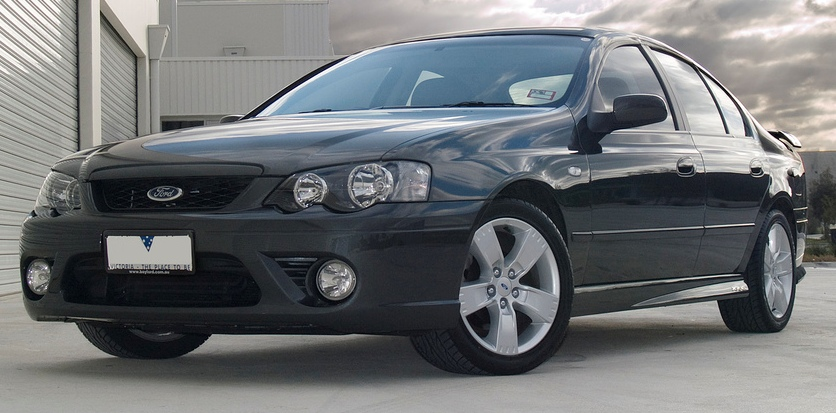
Ford Falcon (BF II) XR6 sedan

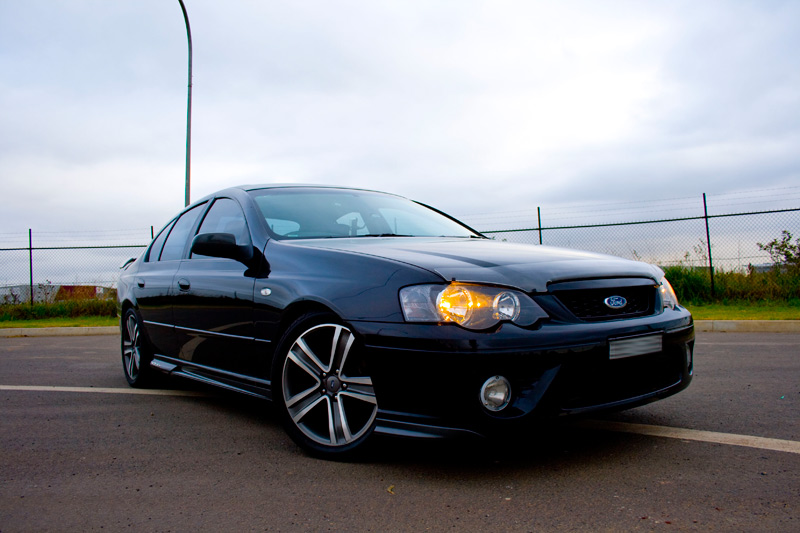
Ford Falcon (BF II) XR6 Turbo (2007 update)

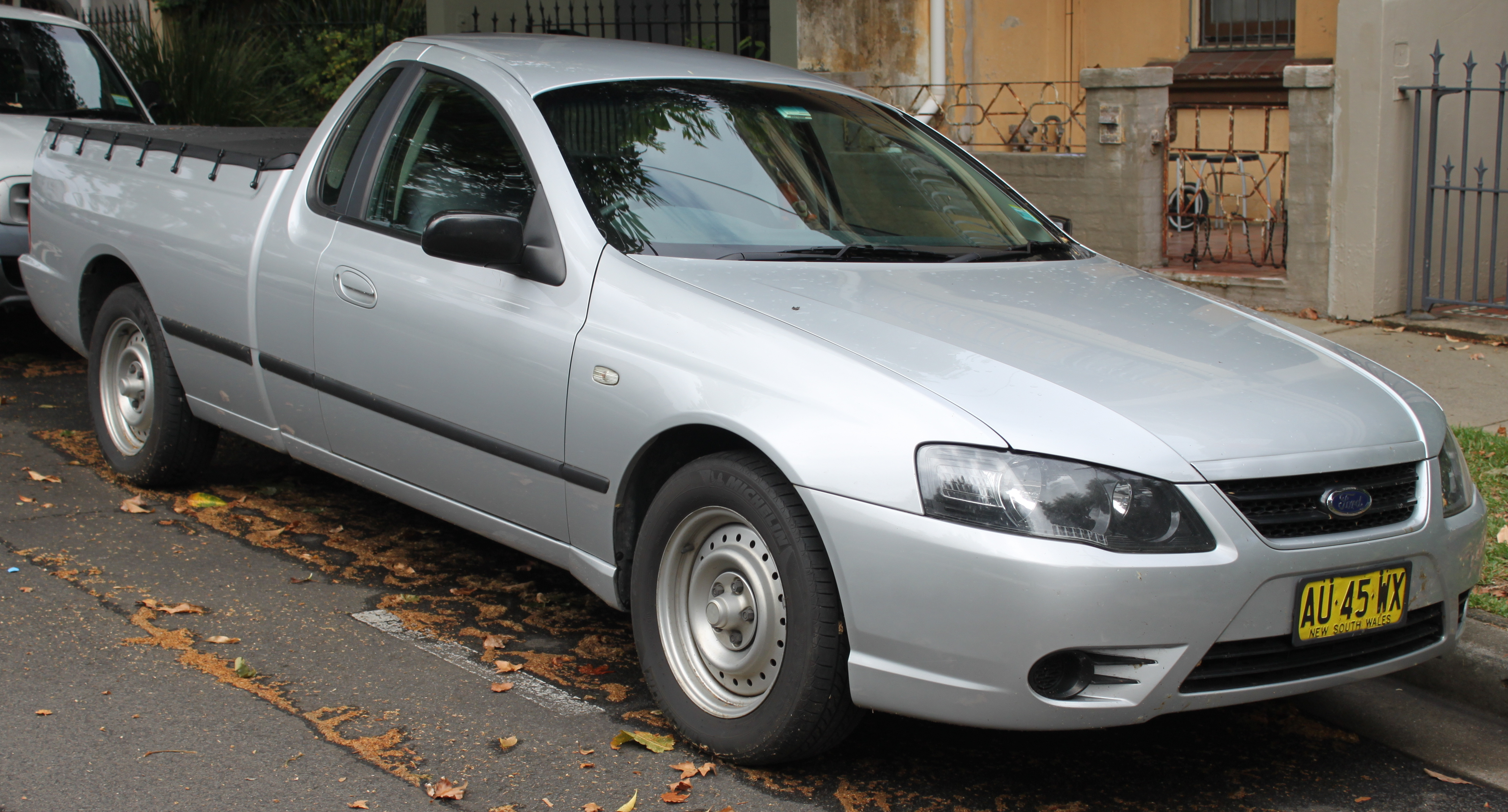
Ford Falcon (BF II) XL utility

=== Mk III ===
Whilst the BF Series sedans and utes were replaced by the FG range in February 2008, Ford maintained a very limited number of BF models in Mk III specification. The Futura model was discontinued leaving the base model XT as the only model remaining, primarily for the fleet.

The Falcon Mk III gained Dynamic Stability Control (available on petrol powered models only), the new flip key from the FG series, satin alloy accents on the front grille surround, ‘Warm Charcoal’ carpet, Goodyear Excellence tyres and rear Mk III badging on the boot lid.

The BF Falcon wagon was discontinued in late 2010 and was never replaced directly, the closest successors were the Territory and the Mondeo wagon.

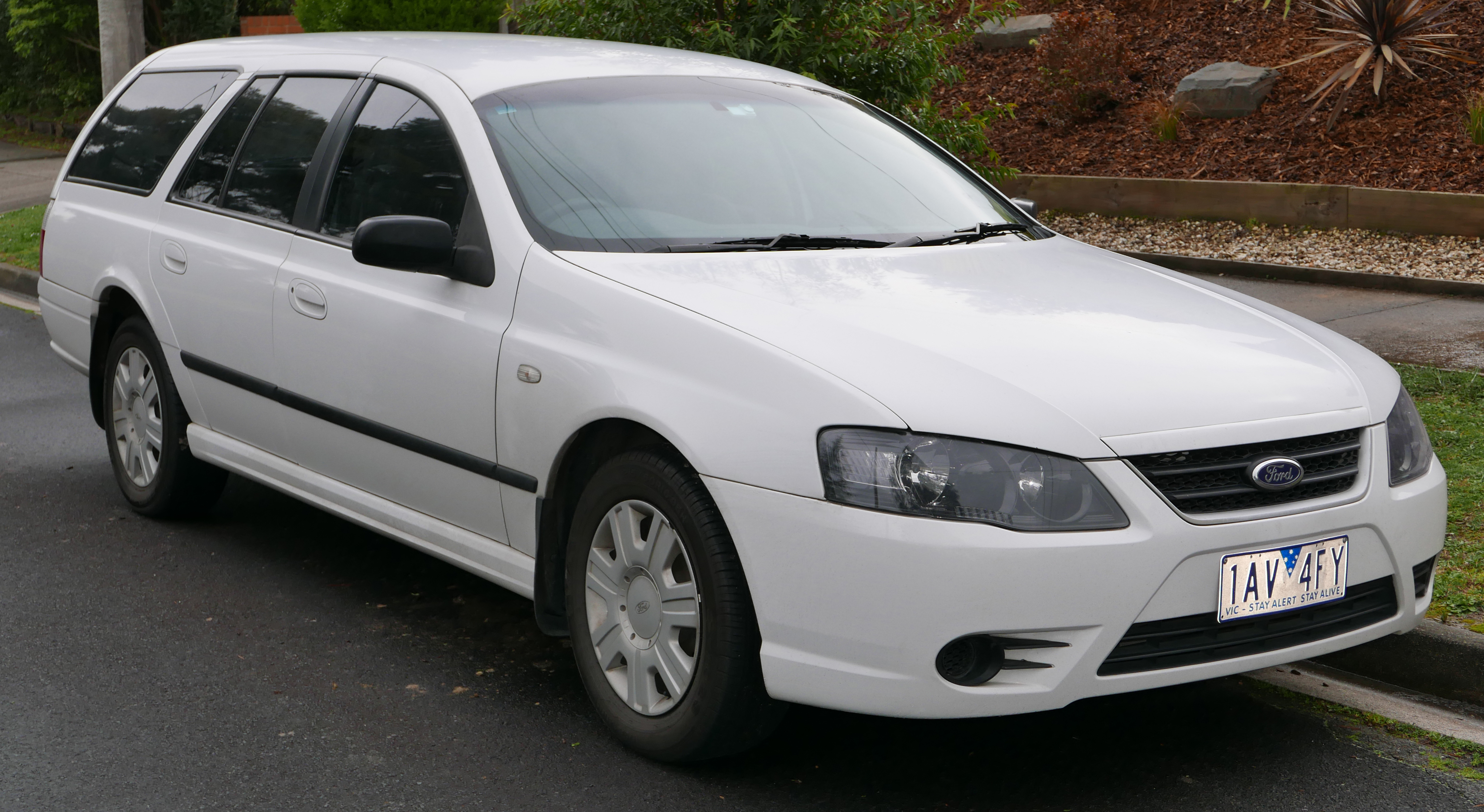
Ford Falcon (BF III) XT wagon

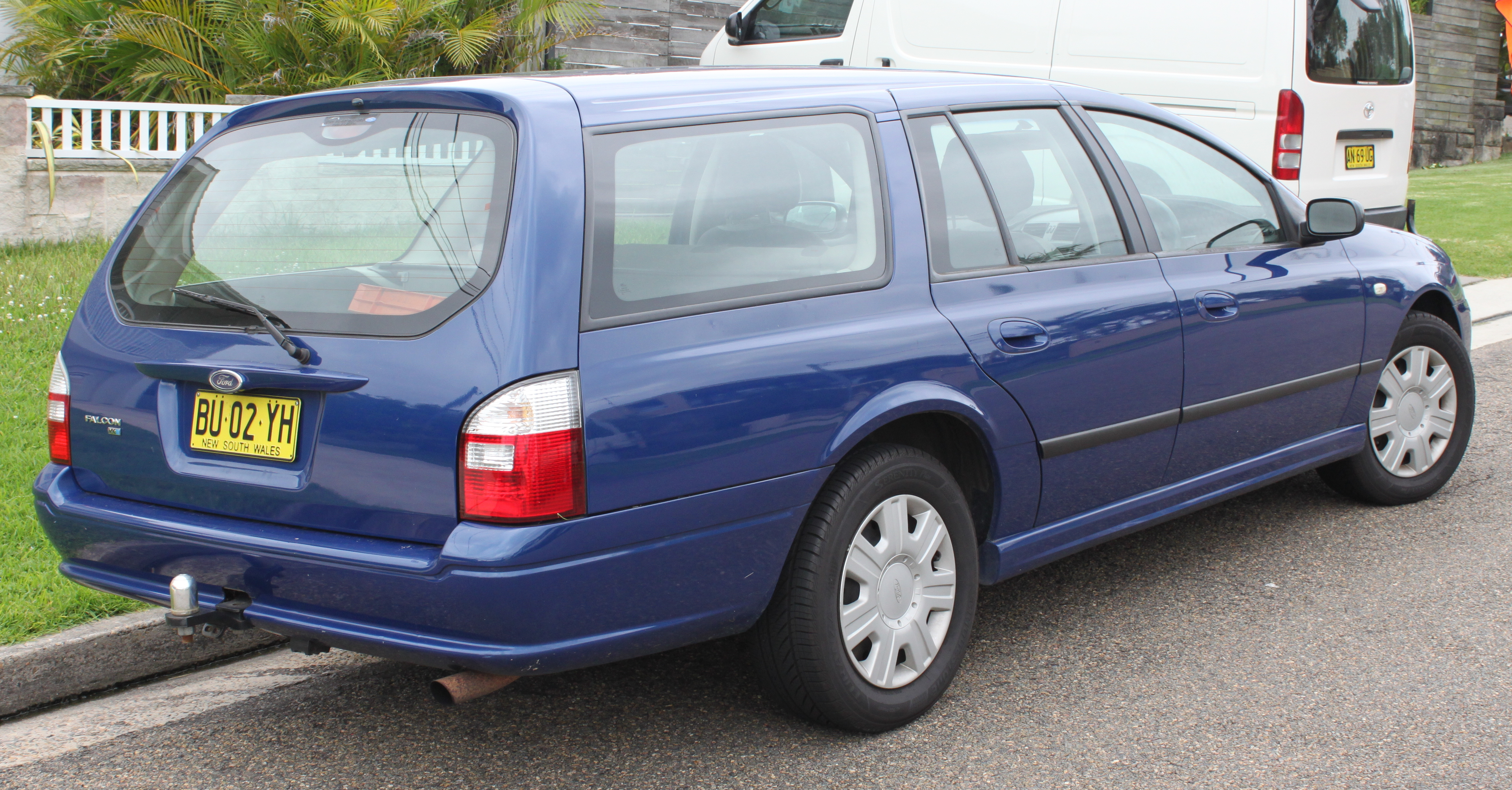
Ford Falcon (BF III) XT wagon

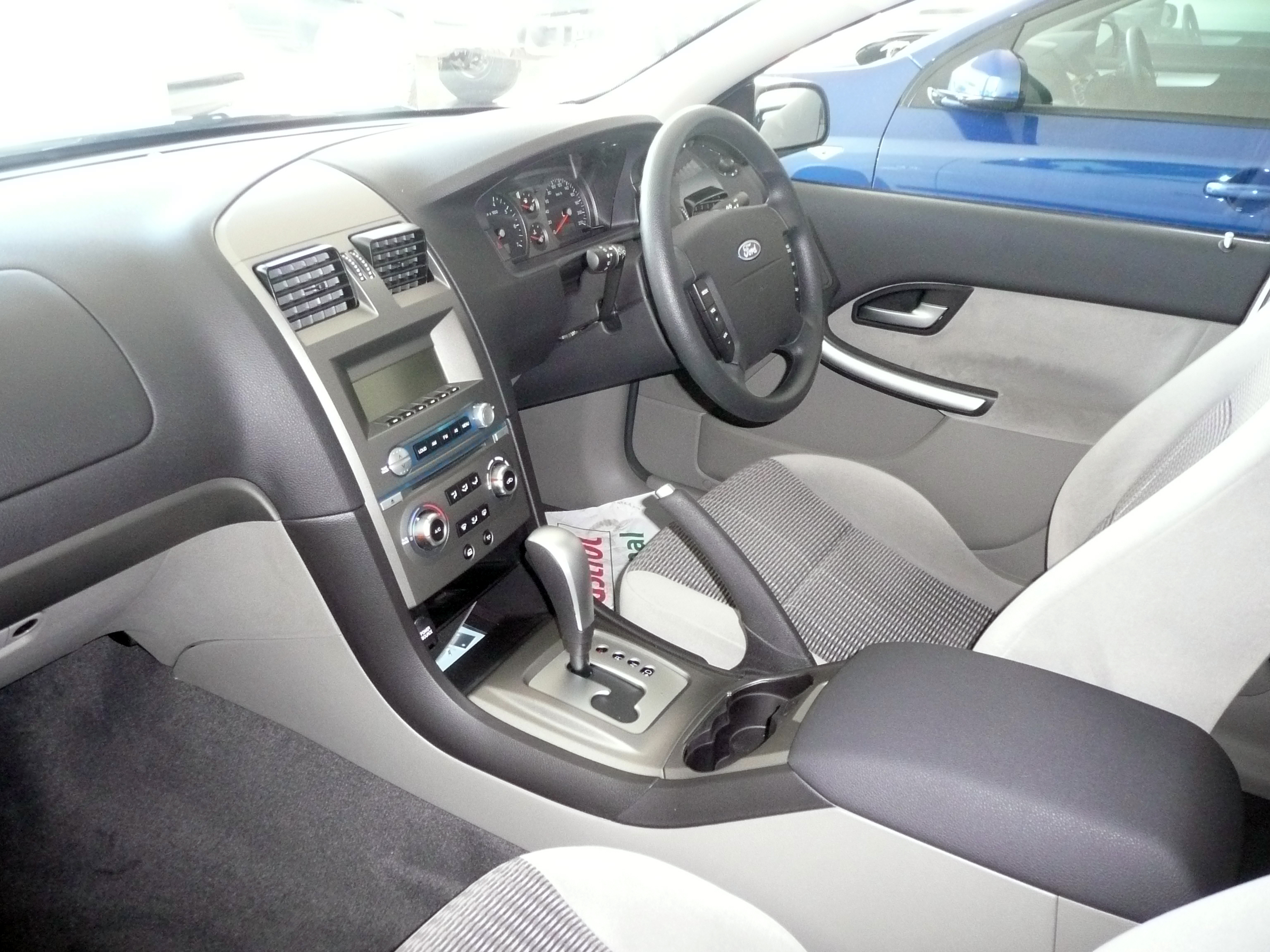
Interior

== FPV range ==
Engine specifications remained largely unchanged apart from software updates for idle stabilisation in V8 equipped GT and GT-P. Of particular note, the BF & BF2 Boss 290 engines were fitted with a standalone air-to-oil transmission heat exchanger behind the front bumper, permanently eliminating any 'milkshake' problems common to all other lower spec BF cars. All models share the same six-speed manual and were now offered with an optional ZF made German six-speed automatic (as equipped in Jaguars and BMWs, but software specifically recalibrated by FPV- entering Sport Mode added 100 driver points of aggressiveness to shift speed, firmness and heightened rpm shift points over everyday normal driver Eco mode). The GT received the GT-P's old 19-inch wheels, and the GT-P and Super Pursuit received their own specific road wheel styles. Typhoon & Tornado versions had optional 18-inch road wheel design used on the previous model, or a new 19-inch design with black spokes. All models received new updated body kits, with the F6 Typhoon benefiting from its own unique styling changes. The F6 now had color coded fog lamp surrounds, and a lower grille insert emphasizing the larger intercooler. The rear now had a new bumper design with meshed inserts, and a deeper diffuser, with the GT-P models now sporting a unique dual exit exhaust system cut into the deep rear diffuser.

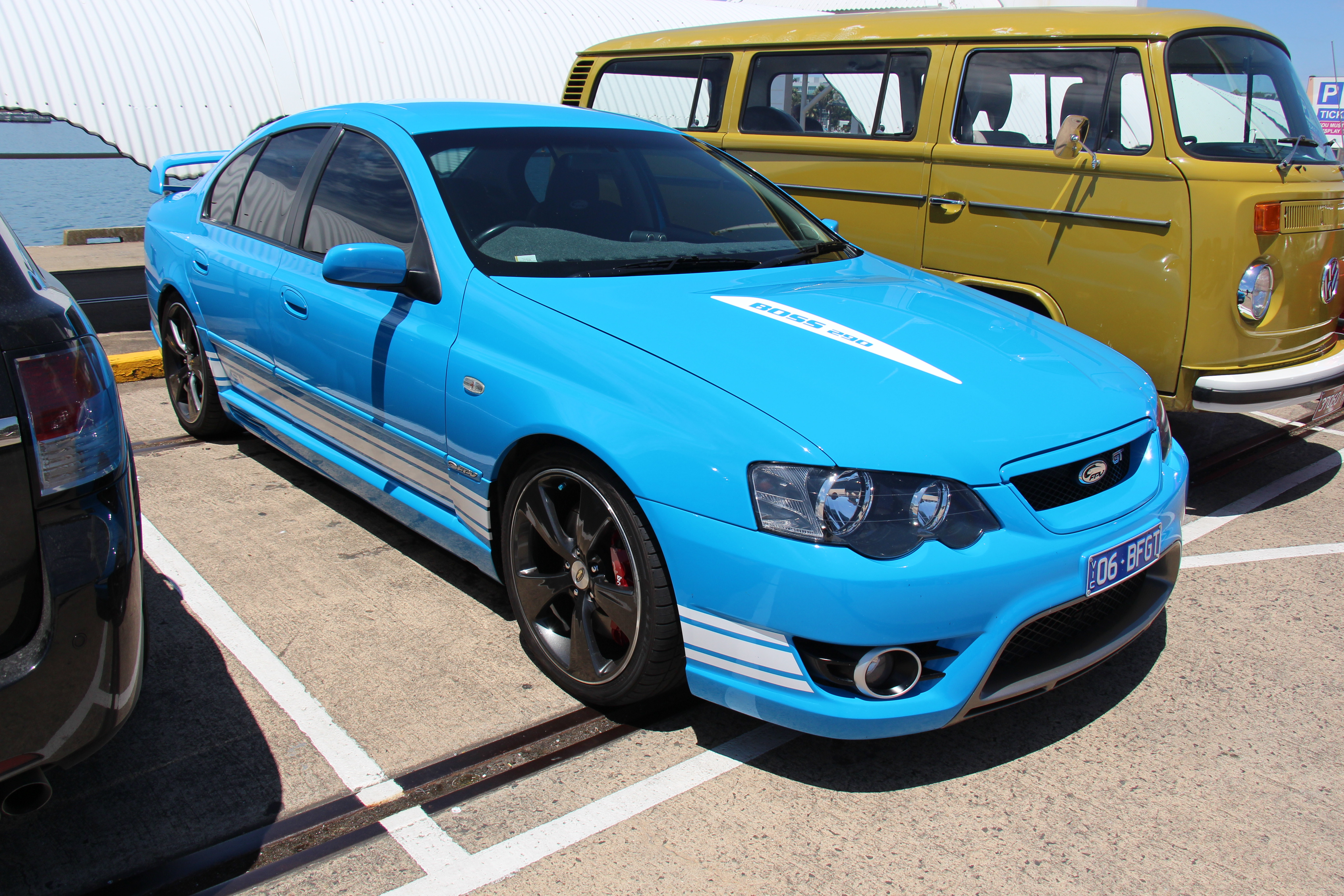
FPV GT sedan

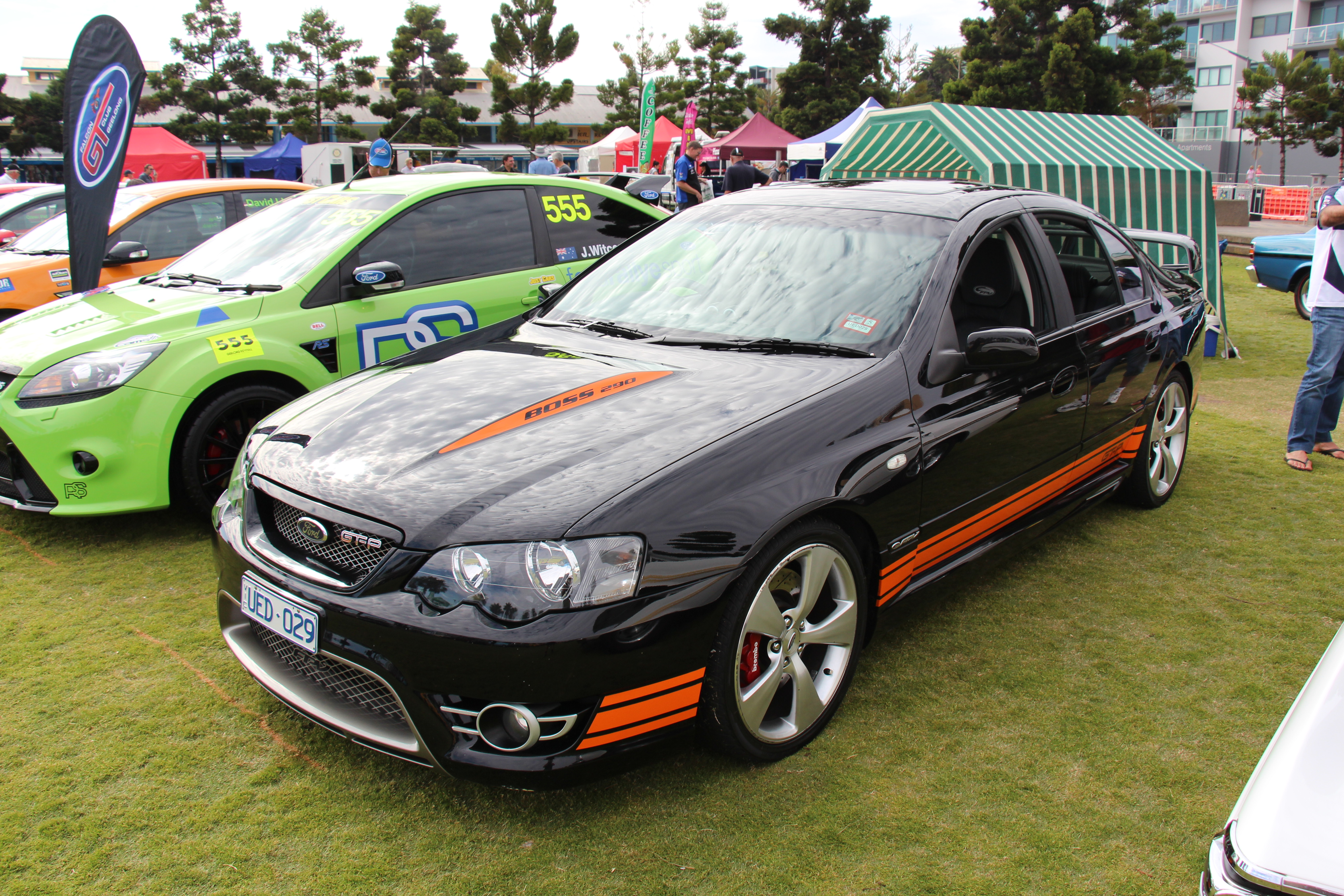
FPV GT-P sedan

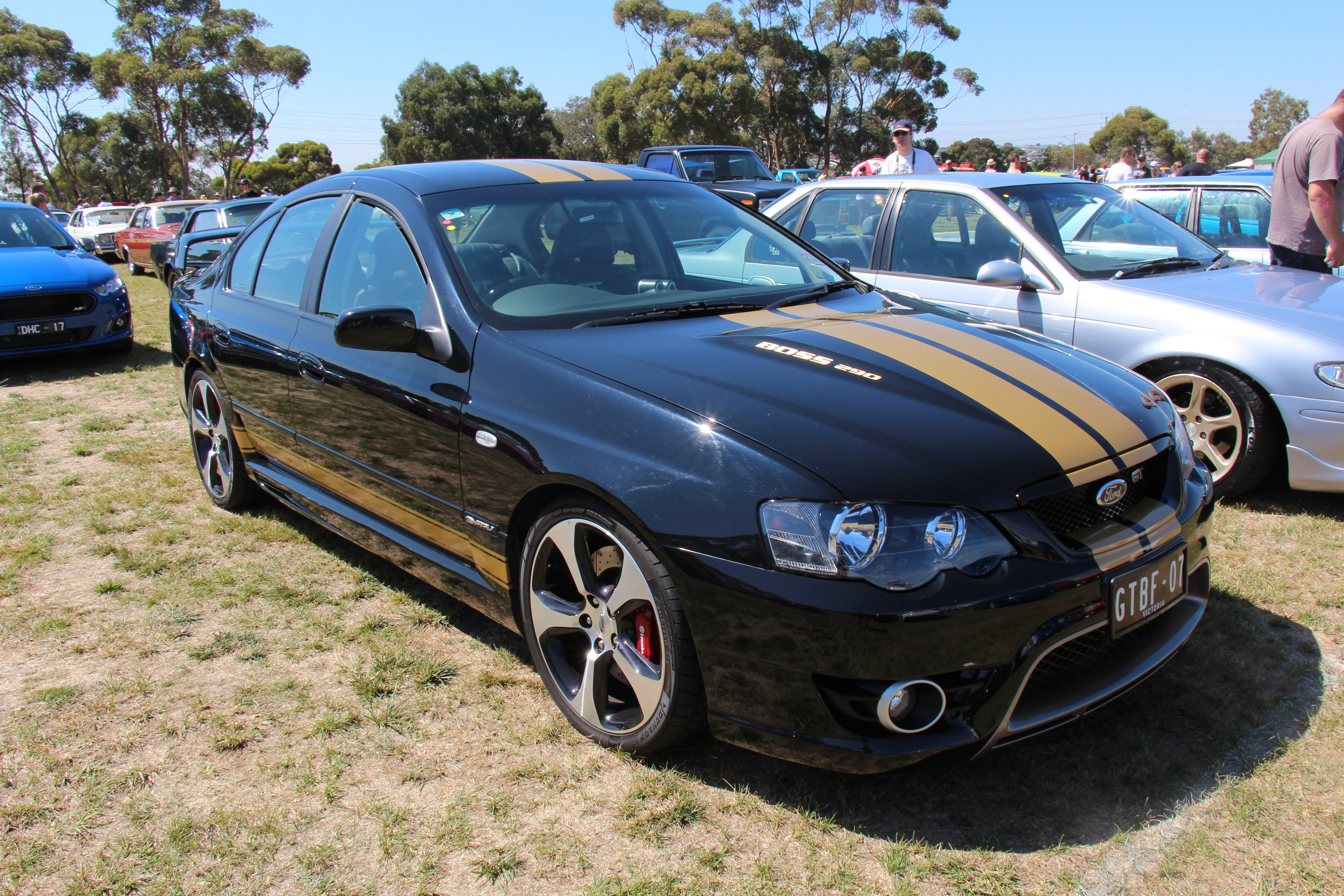
FPV GT 40th Anniversary sedan

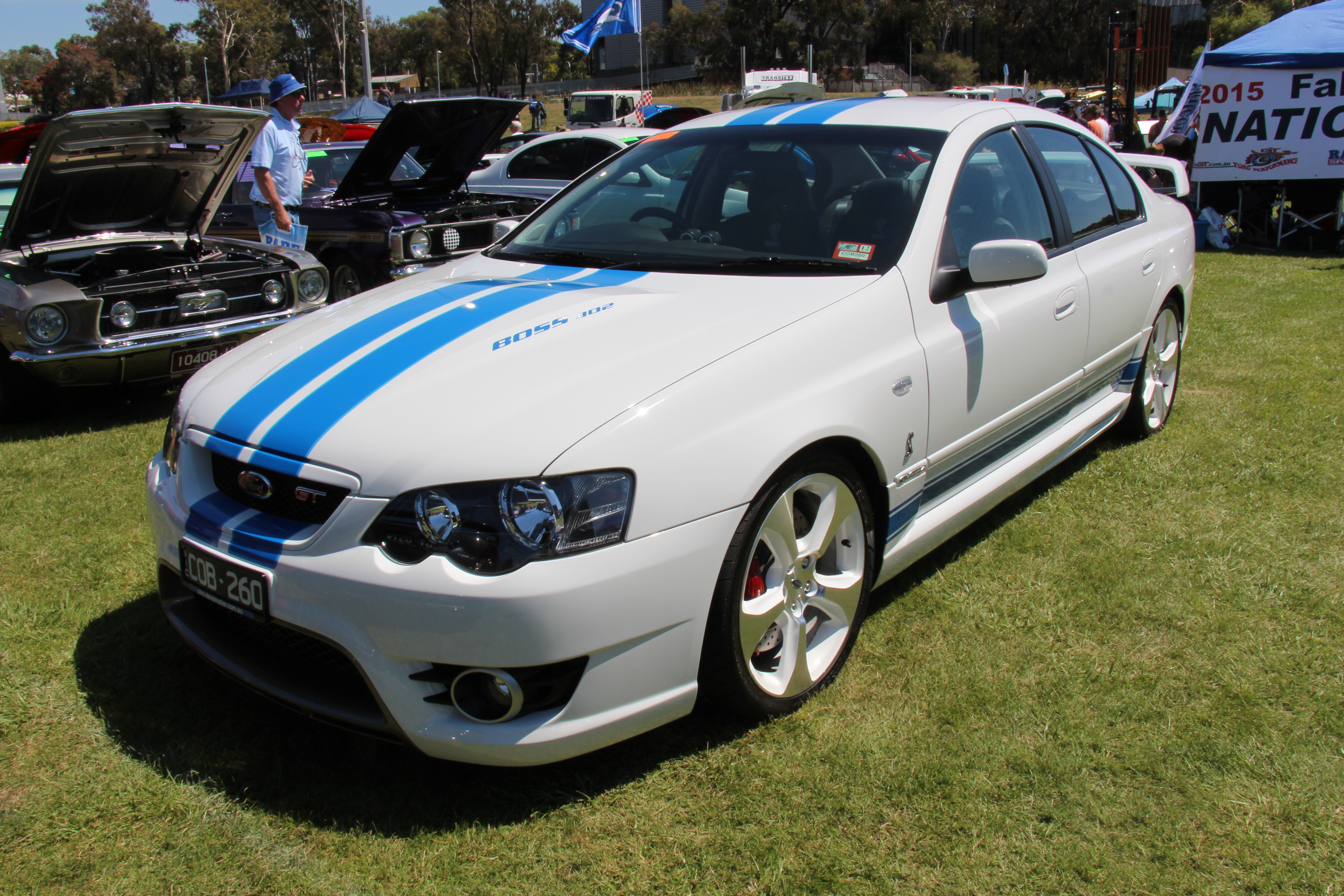
FPV GT Cobra sedan

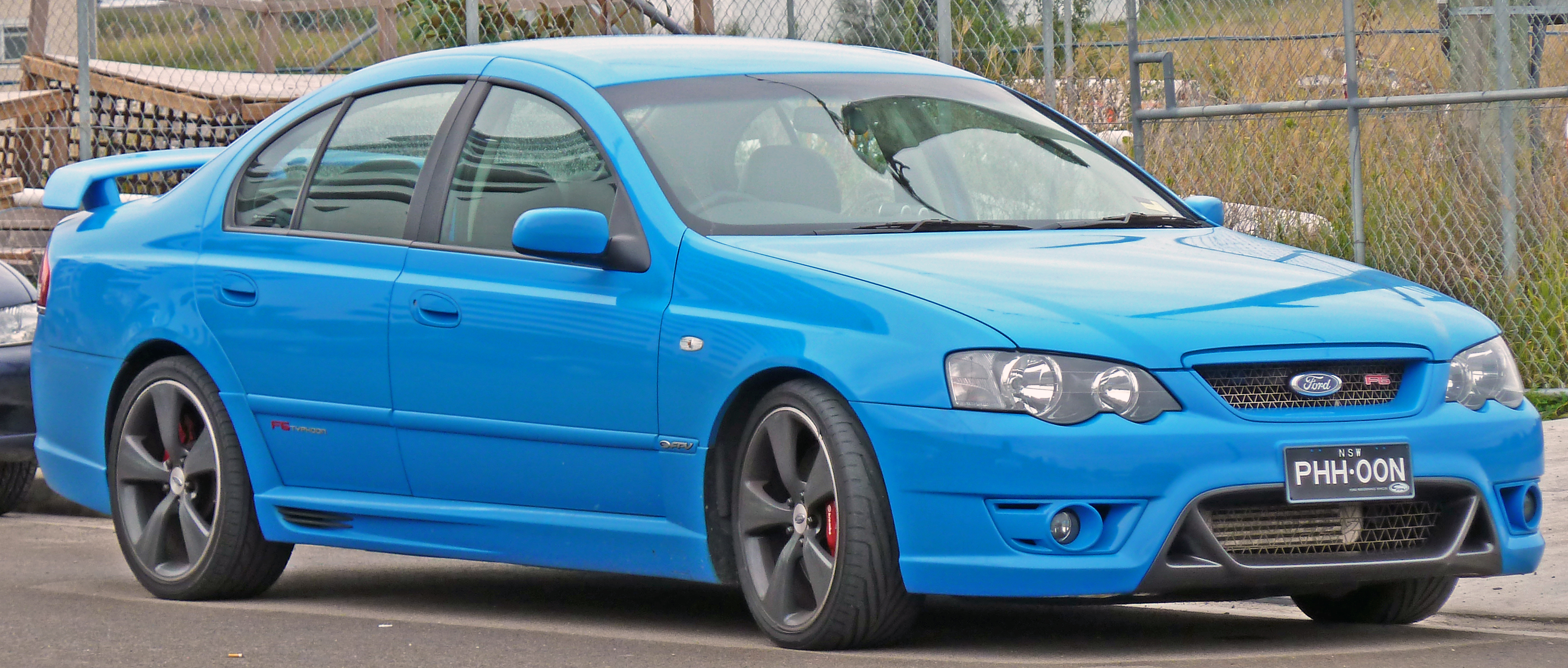
FPV F6 Typhoon sedan

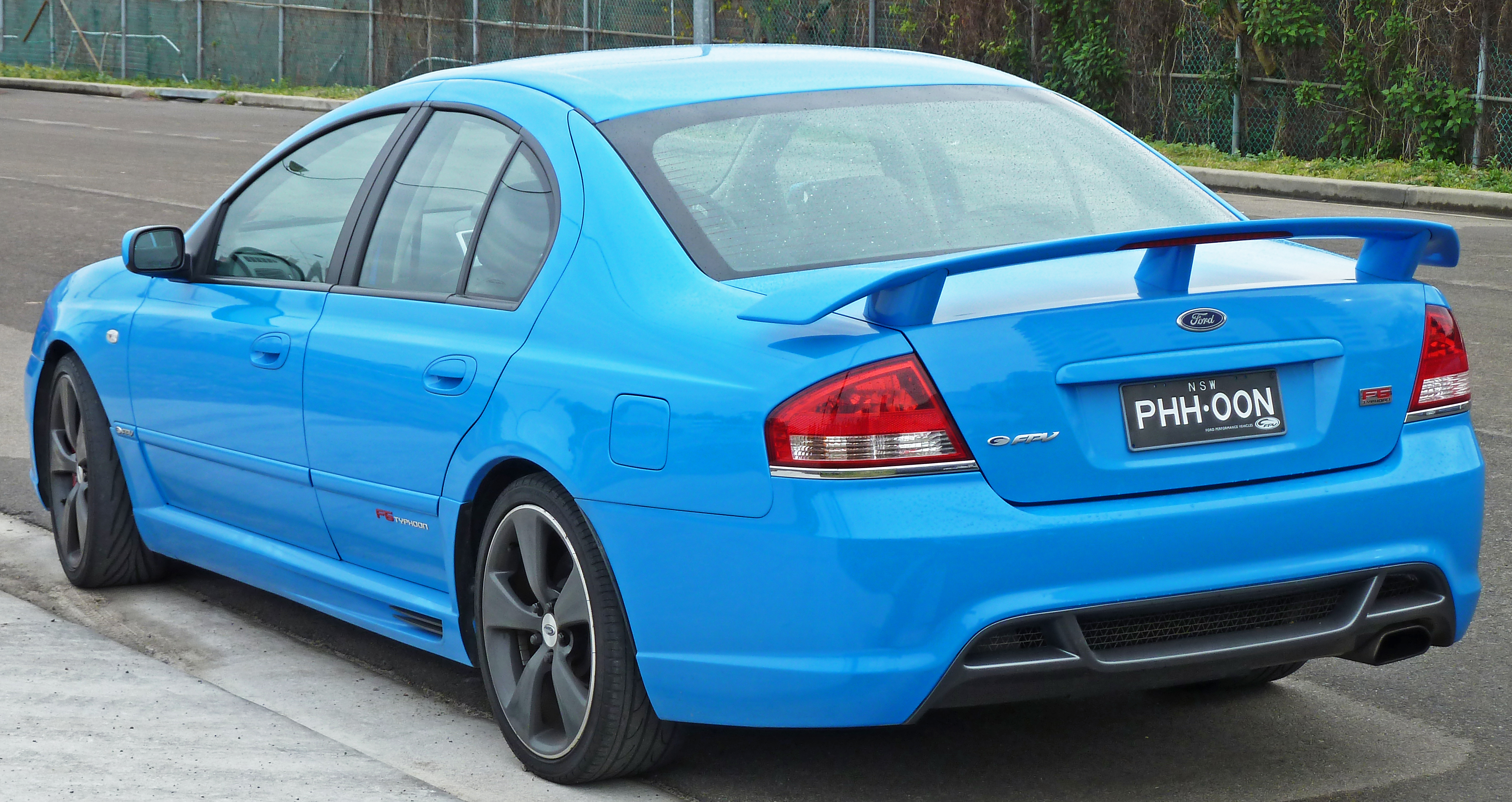
FPV F6 Typhoon sedan

2006 BF MkII update

Minor changes such as a new knurled power mirror control switch knob and interior footwell illumination were introduced with this update; however, all models now came standard with 19-inch rims. Subtle body styling & accent colour changes were made, but the most significant news was the introduction of new Force 6 and Force 8 models. Built to rival HSV's Senator Signature, they were mechanically identical to the auto-equipped base GT model, but in a more luxury-focused package with more conservative visuals than GT-P or GT (no rear wing and more conservative colour ranges). In the final months of the BF MkII Falcon, a number of limited edition models were released - namely, the GT "40th Anniversary" (to commemorate the Falcon GT nameplate).; the F6 "R-Spec" Typhoon, which is the only limited edition turbo FPV and the only turbo Rspec ever; the GT "Cobra R-spec" sedan and utility (all of which received stiffer "R-Spec" dampers and, in the case of the sedan, a power increase to 405 hp (302 kW)

300 R Spec model Typhoons were produced in 2007. The Typhoon Rspec is the only limited edition turbo FPV and the only turbo Rspec ever. These had unique Argent Dark Silver colour accents on wheels and spoilers, Nappa leather upholstery, R-Spec floor mats, Brembo 4-pot front brakes, ten of these R-Spec Typhoons were exported by Ford Australia into Ford New Zealand, of that ten, one was fitted with a 6-speed manual transmission and the other nine were equipped with 6-speed automatic transmissions.

Only 200 BF Mk.2 GT-P 40th Anniversary models were produced, making it the rarest and most sought after of all the limited edition GT Falcon models, as it was released to commemorate the 40 year anniversary of the GT Falcon legend in Australia (which stretches back to 1967 with the release of the original XR GT Falcon.)

== Sales ==
	Jan	Feb	Mar	Apr	May	Jun	Jul	Aug	Sep	Oct	Nov	Dec	Year	Total
2005	—N/a									3,642	5,064			
2006		4,743		2,563	3,388		3,951	3,703	3,563	2,945			42,390	
2007	1,974			2,255	2,801		3,186	2,973	2,852					
2008	1,252	2,520	2,322		—N/a									
