= Jesse Dixon =

Australian professional racing driver

- Nationality: Australian
- Born: 20 June 1992 (age 34) Adelaide, South Australia

Super2 Series career
- Debut season: 2015
- Current team: MW Motorsport
- Car number: 28
- Former teams: Image Racing
- Starts: 15
- Wins: 0
- Podiums: 0
- Poles: 0
- Best finish: 16th in 2015

Previous series
- 2012 2012-14 2008-09 2010: Supercars Championship; V8 Utes; Australian Formula Ford; Formula BMW Pacific

Jesse Dixon (born 20 June 1992) is an Australian former professional racing driver. He is best known for completing the 2012 Bathurst 1000 in the Shannons Supercar Showdown wildcard.

== Career results ==
Season	Series	Position	Car	Team
2008	Australian Formula Ford Championship	26th	Spectrum 011B	Britek Motorsport
2009	Australian Formula Ford Championship	22nd	Spectrum 011B	Minda Motorsport
2010	Formula BMW Pacific	12th	Mygale FB02	Atlantic Racing Team
2011	Australian Suzuki Swift Series	6th	Suzuki Swift Sport RS	Ice Break Racing
2012	V8 Ute Racing Series	24th	Holden Commodore VE Ute	Ice Break Racing
2012	International V8 Supercars Championship	53rd	Holden Commodore VE	Kelly Racing
2013	V8 Ute Racing Series	14th	Holden Commodore VE Ute	Hayman Reese Towbars
2014	V8 Ute Racing Series	3rd	Holden Commodore VE Ute	Image Racing
2015	V8 Supercars Dunlop Series	16th	Ford Falcon FG	Image Racing
2016	Supercars Dunlop Series	26th	Ford Falcon FG	MW Motorsport

=== Supercars Championship results ===
Supercars Championship results
Year	Team	Car	1	2	3	4	5	6	7	8	9	10	11	12	13	14	15	16	17	18	19	20	21	22	23	24	25	26	27	28	29	30	31	Position	Points
2012	Kelly Racing	Holden Commodore VE	ADE; R1	ADE; R2	SYM; R3	SYM; R4	HAM; R5	HAM; R6	BAR; R7	BAR; R8	BAR; R9	PHI; R10	PHI; R11	HID; R12	HID; R13	TOW; R14	TOW; R15	QLD; R16	QLD; R17	SMP; R18	SMP; R19	SAN; Q	SAN; R20	BAT; R21; 20	SUR; R22	SUR; R23	YMC; R24	YMC; R25	YMC; R26	WIN; R27	WIN; R28	SYD; R29	SYD; R30	53rd	90

=== Bathurst 1000 results ===
Year	Team	Car	Co-driver	Position	Lap
2012	Kelly Racing	Holden Commodore VE	(Australia) Cam Waters	20th	158

=== Complete Super2 Series results ===
(key) (Round results only)

Super2 Series results
Year	Team	Car	1	2	3	4	5	6	7	Position	Points
2015	Image Racing	Ford FG Falcon	ADE; 12	BAR; 12	WIN; 18	TOW; 11	QLD; 10	BAT	HOM	16th	650
2016	MW Motorsport	Ford FG Falcon	ADE; 8	PHI	BAR	TOW	SAN	BAT	HOM	26th	168
