= Shannons Supercar Showdown =

- Genre: Reality TV
- Presented by: Grant Denyer; Rick Kelly; Todd Kelly (2011–2012); Briony Ingerson; Will Davison; Mark Winterbottom (2013)
- Country of origin: Australia
- Original language: English
- No. of seasons: 3
- No. of episodes: 30

Production
- Running time: 30 minutes (including commercials)

Original release
- Network: 7mate
- Release: 24 July 2011 – 9 November 2013

Related
- Shannons Legends of Motorsport

The Shannons Supercar Showdown was an Australian reality television show based around the International V8 Supercars Championship, with drivers competing for a test driver role with Ford Performance Racing. Aired on 7mate in Australia, seasons two and three of the series have appeared in syndication in the United States on Vibrant TV Network.

== Seasons 1 and 2 ==
The first two seasons saw ten drivers from various disciplines competing against each other in a series of challenges to win a drive in the Bathurst 1000 with V8 Supercar team Kelly Racing. The winning driver would co-drive with the show's host, TV personality and racing driver Grant Denyer. Denyer withdrew from the 2012 Bathurst race with a shoulder injury and he was replaced by the 2011 series winner Cameron Waters.

The inaugural series was won by Formula Ford racer Cameron Waters defeating British Touring Car Championship racer Andrew Jordan in the series finale. The second series saw V8 Utes series racer Jesse Dixon defeating Formula Ford racer Glen Wood and Carrera Cup racer Andre Heimgartner in the finale.

Season	Episodes	Air dates	Drivers	Winner
1	11	24 July 2011– 2 October 2011	(Australia) Amber Anderson (New Zealand) Nick Cassidy (Australia) Shae Davies (Australia) Nick Foster (United Kingdom) Andrew Jordan (Australia) Samantha Reid (Australia) David Sera (Australia) Ben Small (Australia) Hayley Swanson (Australia) Cameron Waters	(Australia) Cameron Waters
2	11	16 July 2012– 1 October 2012	(Australia) Adrian Cottrell (Australia) Jesse Dixon (Australia) Sarah Harley (Australia) Ryal Harris (New Zealand) Andre Heimgartner (Australia) Jack Le Brocq (Australia) Andrew McLean (United States) Ed Sevadjian (Australia) Samantha Stevens (Australia) Glen Wood	(Australia) Jesse Dixon

== Season 3 ==
The format of the show underwent a major change for the third season. Eight drivers, in two teams of four, competed for a test driver role with Ford Performance Racing in a series of challenges at Calder Park Raceway. The season was presented by Briony Ingerson. The two teams were called Team Davison and Team Winterbottom, named for the mentors of the two teams, Will Davison and Mark Winterbottom.

In the final showdown the two drivers, both from Team Davison faced off. They were Formula 3 drivers Todd Hazelwood and Tim Macrow. Hazelwood was proclaimed the series winner and won a drive in the Dunlop V8 Supercar Series in a Minda Motorsport prepared Holden Commodore V8 Supercar before taking on a test driver role with Ford Performance Racing in season 2014.

Season	Episodes	Air dates	Drivers	Current series	Winner
3	8	14 September 2013– 9 November 2013	(Australia) Chelsea Angelo	Victorian Formula Ford	(Australia) Todd Hazelwood
3	8	14 September 2013– 9 November 2013	(United Kingdom) Daniel Cammish	British Formula Ford	(Australia) Todd Hazelwood
3	8	14 September 2013– 9 November 2013	(United Kingdom) Adrian Campfield	Karting	(Australia) Todd Hazelwood
3	8	14 September 2013– 9 November 2013	(Australia) Craig Dontas	V8 Utes	(Australia) Todd Hazelwood
3	8	14 September 2013– 9 November 2013	(Australia) James Golding	Victorian Formula Ford	(Australia) Todd Hazelwood
3	8	14 September 2013– 9 November 2013	(Australia) Todd Hazelwood	Australian Formula Three	(Australia) Todd Hazelwood
3	8	14 September 2013– 9 November 2013	(Australia) Macauley Jones	Australian Formula Ford	(Australia) Todd Hazelwood
3	8	14 September 2013– 9 November 2013	(Australia) Tim Macrow	Australian Formula Three	(Australia) Todd Hazelwood

== Fate of the drivers ==
=== Competition winners ===
- Cameron Waters made his Development Series debut in 2012, contesting a half-campaign before joining Ford Performance Racing as a junior driver. Waters would go on to compete in the second tier for another three seasons, winning the championship in 2015 and moving into the Supercars Championship full-time, where as of the conclusion of the 2024 season he has won 15 races, finishing second in the championship twice. He is currently driving for Tickford Racing.
- Jesse Dixon returned to the V8 Utes category, finishing 3rd overall in 2014 before stepping into the Development Series. He completed five rounds of the 2015 season for Image Racing before running out of funding, making a one-off appearance in Adelaide in 2016 before a lack of sponsorship prevented him from furthering his career.
- Todd Hazelwood continued his relationship with Matt Stone Racing after his debut season with the team in 2014, and remained with them until 2019. Like Waters, Hazelwood also won the Super2 Series, in 2017, and subsequently moved into the Supercars Championship. He moved to Brad Jones Racing in 2020 with whom he scored his first podium, before achieving his first victory with Erebus motorsport in the 2024 Bathurst 1000.

=== Other notable drivers ===
- Andre Heimgartner is currently racing in the Supercars Championship for Brad Jones Racing, having debuted in 2015, achieving three race wins.
- James Golding is currently racing in the Supercars Championship, making his full-time debut in the Supercars Championship in 2018. He finished on the podium at the 2025 Bathurst 1000.
- Nick Cassidy forged a successful career in Japan, winning the Japanese Formula 3 Championship in 2015, the Super GT GT500 class in 2017 and the Super Formula Championship in 2019. He now competes in Formula E, finishing 3rd in 2022-23 and 2nd in 2023-24.
- Jack Le Brocq debuted in the Supercars Championship in 2018, after second and third-place finishes in the Super2 Series. He has won twice and now races for Matt Stone Racing.
- Daniel Cammish went on to win the British Formula Ford Championship in 2013 and back-to-back Porsche Carrera Cup Great Britain championships in 2015 and 2016, with a third in 2021. He debuted in the British Touring Car Championship in 2018, finishing 10th overall, before finishing 3rd in 2019, 2020 and 2025.
- Macauley Jones made his full-time debut in the Supercars Championship in 2019, he is currently racing for Brad Jones Racing.
- Shae Davies completed two partial seasons in the 2016 and 2017 Supercars Championship. Davies also finished second in the 2021 Boost Mobile Super Trucks.
- Andrew Jordan went on to win the British Touring Car Championship in 2013 and finished second in 2019. He has also scored a podium in the FIA World Rallycross Championship.
- Chelsea Angelo went on to attempt to qualify for the 2019 W Series, however would fail to progress beyond the evaluation tests and later raced in TCR Australia.
- Tim Macrow won the Australian Drivers' Championship in 2013.

== Results of the program ==
=== Bathurst 1000 ===
Year	Team	Car	Drivers	Position	Laps
2011	Kelly Racing	Holden Commodore VE	(Australia) Grant Denyer (Australia) Cameron Waters	DNF	95
2012	Kelly Racing	Holden Commodore VE	(Australia) Cameron Waters (Australia) Jesse Dixon	20th	158

=== Development Series ===
(key) (Round results only)

Super2 Series results
Year	Driver	Team	Car	1	2	3	4	5	6	7	Position	Points
2013	(Australia) Todd Hazelwood	Minda Motorsport	Holden Commodore VE	ADE	BAR	TOW	QLD	WIN	BAT	SOP; DNS	NC	0
2014	(Australia) Todd Hazelwood	Matt Stone Racing	Ford Falcon FG	ADE; 11	WIN; 12	BAR; 4	TOW; 10	QLD; 19	BAT; 5	SOP; 7	8th	1131
