= Shannons Legends of Motorsport =

- Genre: Motor racing program
- Presented by: Bill Woods
- Starring: Aaron Noonan; Mark Oastler
- Country of origin: Australia
- Original language: English
- No. of seasons: 2
- No. of episodes: 24

Production
- Executive producer: Neil Crompton
- Producer: AirTime Media
- Production locations: Bathurst, New South Wales (2014); Sunshine Coast, Queensland (2014-15); Melbourne, Victoria (2014-15)
- Running time: 60 minutes (including commercials)

Original release
- Network: 7mate
- Release: 19 July 2014 – 12 December 2015

Related
- Shannons Supercar Showdown

Shannons Legends of Motorsport was an Australian motor racing television series that aired on 7mate. First aired in 2014, each episode featured a particular topic from the history of Australian motor racing, with a focus on touring cars. The show included a mix of interviews, analysis and historical footage.

The 'Shannons' in the show's title refers to Shannons Insurance who have a sponsorship arrangement with the show. This was the second motor racing television show aligned with Shannons, following the Shannons Supercar Showdown which aired from 2011 to 2013.

== History ==
The show was launched in July 2014 to complement the Seven Network (parent network of 7mate)'s coverage of V8 Supercars. It aired on Saturdays, but only on weekends that did not coincide with a championship event of the 2014 V8 Supercars season. Hosted by commentator and former driver Neil Crompton, who was also the executive producer, the show used the Seven Network's historical motor racing footage, with the network having held the broadcast rights for touring car racing in Australia, including the Australian Touring Car Championship and Bathurst 1000, in various stages from 1963 to 1996. Season 1 episodes included features on iconic drivers, teams and eras of Australian motor racing.

In late 2014, Crompton left the Seven Network to follow the V8 Supercars broadcast rights to Foxtel and Network Ten. Following this, journalist Bill Woods replaced Crompton as host for Season 2 in 2015. From 1997 to 2006, Woods had hosted RPM, a motor racing program on Ten, and has also written a book on the legends of Australian motor racing. Aaron Noonan also took on a greater role as co-host of the show for the new season. Season 2 covered a wider range of topics than Season 1, including documentary presentations of three Bathurst 1000s. It also featured an episode detailing the history of the Seven Network's motor racing broadcasts, including the invention of RaceCam. Episodes were later repeated on 7mate in an early morning timeslot.

== Production ==
Each episode, produced by Crompton's production company AirTime Media, was recorded in front of a studio audience and featured one or more motor racing figures in conversation with the host. This was intertwined with historical footage and highlights, as well as pre-recorded comments about the episode's theme from former drivers and team owners. The exceptions to this were the episodes which featured a Bathurst 1000 race, which featured no studio guests and only pre-recorded interviews to narrate and accompany extended race highlights. As well as the host, there were also two other on-screen contributors to the show; Aaron Noonan, who researched and introduced video clips from the Seven Network vault, and Mark Oastler, who discussed historic racing cars situated in the studio. Oastler only appeared in selected episodes in Season 2.

In Season 1, each episode was filmed at one of three Australian locations, in front of a range of cars relevant to the theme of the episode. These three locations were the National Motor Racing Museum in Bathurst, New South Wales, Bowden's Own Car Collection in Buderim, Sunshine Coast, Queensland and the Shannons National Auction Centre in Cheltenham, Melbourne, Victoria. For Season 2, only the Bowden's Own Car Collection was retained as a filming location, with a Seven Network studio in Melbourne becoming another location. The studio featured a video screen background instead of the historic cars seen in other filming locations.

== Presenters ==
=== Hosts ===
- Neil Crompton – 2014
- Bill Woods – 2015

=== Co-host ===
- Aaron Noonan – 2014-15

=== Reporter ===
- Mark Oastler – 2014-15

== Episodes ==
=== Season 1 (2014) ===
Ep #	Airdate	Theme	Guest(s)	Location
1	19 July 2014	Allan Moffat	Allan Moffat and John French	Bowden's Own Car Collection
2	26 July 2014	Larry Perkins	Larry Perkins	National Motor Racing Museum
3	9 August 2014	Dick Johnson and John Bowe	Dick Johnson and John Bowe	Bowden's Own Car Collection
4	16 August 2014	Nissan Motorsport	Fred Gibson, Jim Richards and Mark Skaife	Shannons National Auction Centre
5	30 August 2014	Allan Grice	Allan Grice	National Motor Racing Museum
6	6 September 2014	1980s	Kevin Bartlett, Tony Longhurst and Tomas Mezera	Bowden's Own Car Collection
7	20 September 2014	Jim Richards	Jim Richards	Shannons National Auction Centre
8	4 October 2014	Allan Moffat	Allan Moffat	National Motor Racing Museum
9	18 October 2014	1987	John Bowe and Glenn Seton	Bowden's Own Car Collection
10	1 November 2014	Mark Skaife	Mark Skaife	Shannons National Auction Centre
11	8 November 2014	Colin Bond	Colin Bond	National Motor Racing Museum
12	22 November 2014	Peter Brock	John Harvey, Jim Richards and Brad Jones	Shannons National Auction Centre

=== Season 2 (2015) ===
Ep #	Airdate	Theme	Guest(s)	Location
1	19 September 2015	Dick Johnson	Dick Johnson, John French and John Bowe	Bowden's Own Car Collection
2	26 September 2015	Seven Motorsport	Mike Raymond, Garry Wilkinson and Mark Oastler	Studio
3	10 October 2015	Bathurst 1972	No studio guests	Bowden's Own Car Collection
4	17 October 2015	Bob Morris	Bob Morris	Bowden's Own Car Collection
5	24 October 2015	Kevin Bartlett and Brad Jones	Kevin Bartlett and Brad Jones	Studio
6	31 October 2015	John Bowe	John Bowe and Dick Johnson	Bowden's Own Car Collection
7	7 November 2015	Bathurst 1973	No studio guests	Bowden's Own Car Collection
8	14 November 2015	George Fury	George Fury, Fred Gibson and Christine Gibson	Studio
9	21 November 2015	Glenn Seton	Glenn Seton	Bowden's Own Car Collection
10	28 November 2015	The Originals^{1}	Kevin Bartlett, Fred Gibson, John Harvey and Brad Jones	Studio
11	5 December 2015	Bathurst 1990	No studio guests	Bowden's Own Car Collection
12	12 December 2015	The Legend of Bathurst	No studio guests	Studio

Notes

- ^1 – 'The Originals' episode featured five drivers from the early stages of Australian touring car racing; Norm Beechey, Harry Firth, Ian Geoghegan, Leo Geoghegan and Bob Jane.

== Recognition ==
Shannons Legends of Motorsport received awards from both the Confederation of Australian Motor Sport and the V8 Media Association in 2014.

== Home video ==
The twelve episodes of Season 1 were released in a DVD box set by Chevron Marketing Services in August 2015. Season 2 was released in a box set in July 2016.

== See also ==
- List of Australian television series
- List of longest-running Australian television series
