= 2011 Supercheap Auto Bathurst 1000 =

Motor race in Australia

Seasons
- ← 2010 2012 →

(New South Wales) 2011 Supercheap Auto Bathurst 1000
Event Information
- Round 10 of 14 in the 2011 International V8 Supercars Championship
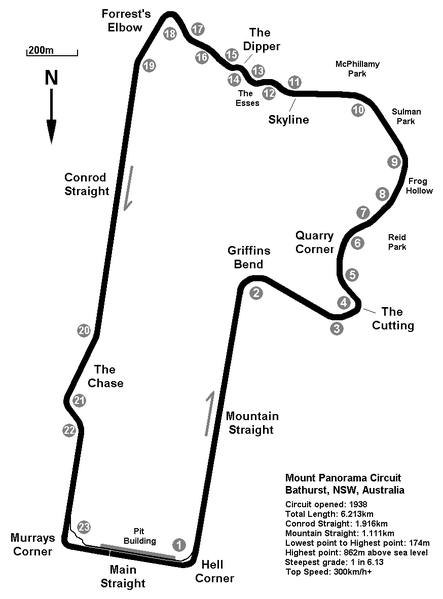
- Date: 6–9 October 2011
- Location: Bathurst, New South Wales
- Venue: Mount Panorama Circuit
- Weather: Overcast, occasional showers

Results
Race 1
Distance	161 laps	1000 km
Pole position	Greg Murphy; Kelly Racing	2:08.8009
Winner	Garth Tander; Nick Percat; Holden Racing Team	6:26:52.2691

The 2011 Supercheap Auto Bathurst 1000 was an Australian touring car motor race for V8 Supercars. The race was on Sunday, 9 October 2011 at the Mount Panorama Circuit just outside Bathurst, New South Wales, Australia and was Race 20 of the 2011 International V8 Supercars Championship. It was the fifteenth running of the Australian 1000 race, first held after the organisational split over the Bathurst 1000 that occurred in 1997. It was also the 54th race for which the lineage can be traced back to the 1960 Armstrong 500 held at Phillip Island.

The race was won by Garth Tander and Nick Percat of the Holden Racing Team by 0.3 of a second over defending race winners Craig Lowndes and Mark Skaife of the Triple Eight Race Engineering team. Tander was forced to resist a last minute charge from Lowndes as Tander's car faded in the closing laps. The Kelly Racing car of Greg Murphy and Allan Simonsen finished third, completing a Holden Commodore clean sweep of the podium positions. Percat became the first South Australian born driver to win the Bathurst 1000, although South Australian raised Russell Ingall had won the race previously.

== Entry list ==
The race saw the entry of one wildcard, through Kelly Racing's Shannons Supercar Showdown television show. Cam Waters, one of the drivers of the wildcard entry, would become the youngest ever Bathurst 1000 starter at 17 years, 2 months and 6 days old - beating the previous record (set by Paul Dumbrell in 1999) by 8 days.

No.	Drivers	Team (Sponsor)	Car	No.	Drivers	Team (Sponsor)	Car
1	(Australia) James Courtney (Australia) Cameron McConville	Holden Racing Team (Holden, Toll)	Holden Commodore VE	18	(Australia) James Moffat (New Zealand) Matthew Halliday	Dick Johnson Racing (Jim Beam Bonded)	Ford Falcon FG
2	(Australia) Garth Tander (Australia) Nick Percat	Holden Racing Team (Holden, Toll)	Holden Commodore VE	19	(Australia) Jonathon Webb (United Kingdom) Richard Lyons	Tekno Autosports (Mother Energy)	Ford Falcon FG
3	(Australia) Tony D'Alberto (Australia) Dale Wood	Tony D'Alberto Racing (Wilson Security, McGrath Foundation)	Ford Falcon FG	21	(Australia) Karl Reindler (Australia) David Wall	Britek Motorsport (Fair Dinkum Sheds)	Holden Commodore VE
4	(Australia) Alex Davison (Australia) David Brabham	Stone Brothers Racing (Irwin Tools)	Ford Falcon FG	30	(Australia) Warren Luff (Australia) Nathan Pretty	Lucas Dumbrell Motorsport (Gulf Western Oil)	Holden Commodore VE
5	(Australia) Mark Winterbottom (New Zealand) Steven Richards	Ford Performance Racing (Orrcon Steel)	Ford Falcon FG	33	(Australia) Lee Holdsworth (Australia) Greg Ritter	Garry Rogers Motorsport (Fujitsu)	Holden Commodore VE
6	(Australia) Will Davison (Australia) Luke Youlden	Ford Performance Racing (Trading Post)	Ford Falcon FG	34	(Australia) Michael Caruso (Australia) Marcus Marshall	Garry Rogers Motorsport (Fujitsu)	Holden Commodore VE
7	(Australia) Todd Kelly (Australia) David Russell	Kelly Racing (Jack Daniel's)	Holden Commodore VE	47	(Australia) Tim Slade (New Zealand) Daniel Gaunt	James Rosenberg Racing (Lucky 7 Convenience Stores)	Ford Falcon FG
8	(Australia) Jason Bright (Australia) Andrew Jones	Brad Jones Racing (BOC Gas and Gear)	Holden Commodore VE	49	(Australia) Steve Owen (Australia) Paul Morris	Paul Morris Motorsport (VIP Petfoods)	Holden Commodore VE
9	(New Zealand) Shane van Gisbergen (New Zealand) John McIntyre	Stone Brothers Racing (SP Tools)	Ford Falcon FG	55	(Australia) Paul Dumbrell (Australia) Dean Canto	Rod Nash Racing (The Bottle-O)	Ford Falcon FG
11	(New Zealand) Greg Murphy (Denmark) Allan Simonsen	Kelly Racing (Pepsi Max)	Holden Commodore VE	61	(New Zealand) Fabian Coulthard (New Zealand) Craig Baird	Walkinshaw Racing (Bundaberg Rum: Five)	Holden Commodore VE
12	(Australia) Dean Fiore (Australia) Michael Patrizi	Triple F Racing (WesTrac Caterpillar)	Ford Falcon FG	77	(Australia) Grant Denyer (Australia) Cam Waters	Kelly Racing (Shannons, Mars)	Holden Commodore VE
14	(Australia) Jason Bargwanna (Australia) Shane Price	Brad Jones Racing (Jana Living)	Holden Commodore VE	88	(Australia) Jamie Whincup (Australia) Andrew Thompson	Triple Eight Race Engineering (Vodafone)	Holden Commodore VE
15	(Australia) Rick Kelly (Australia) Owen Kelly	Kelly Racing (Jack Daniel's)	Holden Commodore VE	200	(Australia) Russell Ingall (Australia) Jack Perkins	Paul Morris Motorsport (Supercheap Auto)	Holden Commodore VE
16	(Australia) David Reynolds (Australia) Tim Blanchard	Kelly Racing (Stratco)	Holden Commodore VE	888	(Australia) Craig Lowndes (Australia) Mark Skaife	Triple Eight Race Engineering (Vodafone)	Holden Commodore VE
17	(Australia) Steven Johnson (Australia) David Besnard	Dick Johnson Racing (Jim Beam Black)	Ford Falcon FG				

*Entries with a grey background were wildcard entries which did not compete in the full championship season.

== Practice ==
Thursday practice was plagued by rain and rumours over the condition of Dunlop's supply of wet weather tyres. Fog caused the third practice session to be cancelled while the tyre supply situation was clarified.

Tim Slade in the James Rosenberg Racing Falcon was fastest in the first session on Thursday, setting a 2:24.2255 lap time in damp conditions. Slade's Stone Brothers Racing teammate Shane van Gisbergen was second fastest ahead of James Moffat. Reigning series champion James Courtney was the fastest Holden, 1.4 seconds behind Slade. The second session, only for co-drivers, was slower and wetter. Ford Performance Racing's Steven Richards was fastest at 2:27.8960, over three seconds behind the previous session. David Besnard (Dick Johnson Racing) was second fastest ahead of the first Holden, David Russell of Kelly Racing who was just ahead of 2010 Bathurst winner, Mark Skaife.

The Friday morning session gained new importance when V8 Supercar series points leader Jamie Whincup crashed at the Cutting, crashing hard enough to bend his car's chassis rails. Cameron McConville took his Holden Racing Team Commodore to the top of the co-driver practice session ahead of Skaife and Richards, with McConville setting a 2:09.8765 in the dry, while Shane van Gisbergen set the fastest time of the meeting thus far at 2:07.6035, ahead of Whincup prior to his crash and Mark Winterbottom, while Brad Jones Racing left the #14 Holden of Jason Bargwanna and Shane Price on the sidelines, changing an engine.

== Qualifying ==
Holden Racing Team's Garth Tander set the fastest lap time during the qualifying session on Friday. Tander set a 2:07.6640 lap time to secure the prime final position in the Top Ten Shootout to be held on Saturday morning. Tander set the time late in the session and was good enough to hold off a last lap effort from Mark Winterbottom. Winterbottom was five hundredths of a second slower than Tander with Jamie Whincup three hundredths further away in his repaired Commodore. David Reynolds and Kelly Racing teammate Greg Murphy climbed up the order on their final laps. Craig Lowndes (Triple Eight Race Engineering), James Courtney, Lee Holdsworth (Garry Rogers Motorsport), Shane van Gisbergen and Steve Owen (Paul Morris Motorsport) secured the other positions in the top ten shootout. Will Davison just missed out on the top ten by five hundredths of a second with his Ford Performance Racing teammate Paul Dumbrell also just missing out in the final moments. Alex Davison (Stone Brothers Racing), Michael Caruso (Garry Rogers Motorsport) and Tim Slade completed the top 15. Following the session, Lee Holdsworth was demoted five grid positions after he missed the scales at the end of qualifying. The penalty sees Will Davison move into the top ten shootout.

29th and last was the Kelly Racing Commodore of TV weather presenter Grant Denyer who made a return to racing after a long layoff to mentor the winner of a reality TV competition aimed at discovering young racing drivers. The winner, Cam Waters, became the youngest driver to ever compete for the race.

The only serious set-back in qualifying was a last lap crash when Jason Bargwanna hit the wall at the Esses, heavily damaging the front end of his Brad Jones Racing Commodore.

=== Shootout ===
Will Davison was the first driver out in the shootout, setting a time of 2:08.8821. Steve Owen, Shane van Gisbergen, James Courtney and Craig Lowndes all failed to better Davison's time, Lowndes coming closest with a 2:09.2197. 2003 pole-sitter Greg Murphy was three tenths up at the first split and went on to beat Davison by eight one hundredths of a second with a 2:08.8009, which would prove to be the pole time. Murphy's teammate David Reynolds complained of smoke in the cabin from a gearbox issue at the start of his lap, going slowest with a 2:10.1570. Jamie Whincup, Mark Winterbottom and Garth Tander all had their laps ruined when rain started to fall, Whincup having a few moments on his lap. Winterbottom coasted around to take tenth place while Tander pushed a bit harder to take ninth.

== Results ==
=== Qualifying ===
Pos	No	Name	Car	Team	Time
1	2	(Australia) Garth Tander (Australia) Nick Percat	Holden VE Commodore	Holden Racing Team	2:07.6640
2	5	(Australia) Mark Winterbottom (New Zealand) Steven Richards	Ford FG Falcon	Ford Performance Racing	2:07.7187
3	88	(Australia) Jamie Whincup (Australia) Andrew Thompson	Holden VE Commodore	Triple Eight Race Engineering	2:07.7408
4	16	(Australia) David Reynolds (Australia) Tim Blanchard	Holden VE Commodore	Kelly Racing	2:07.8371
5	11	(New Zealand) Greg Murphy (Denmark) Allan Simonsen	Holden VE Commodore	Kelly Racing	2:07.9126
6	888	(Australia) Craig Lowndes (Australia) Mark Skaife	Holden VE Commodore	Triple Eight Race Engineering	2:08.0024
7	1	(Australia) James Courtney (Australia) Cameron McConville	Holden VE Commodore	Holden Racing Team	2:08.0035
8	9	(New Zealand) Shane van Gisbergen (New Zealand) John McIntyre	Ford FG Falcon	Stone Brothers Racing	2:08.0955
9	49	(Australia) Steve Owen (Australia) Paul Morris	Holden VE Commodore	Paul Morris Motorsport	2:08.1411
10	6	(Australia) Will Davison (Australia) Luke Youlden	Ford FG Falcon	Ford Performance Racing	2:08.1982
11	55	(Australia) Paul Dumbrell (Australia) Dean Canto	Ford FG Falcon	Rod Nash Racing	2:08.2443
12	4	(Australia) Alex Davison (Australia) David Brabham	Ford FG Falcon	Stone Brothers Racing	2:08.2887
13	33	(Australia) Lee Holdsworth (Australia) Greg Ritter	Holden VE Commodore	Garry Rogers Motorsport	2:08.0942^{1}
14	34	(Australia) Michael Caruso (Australia) Marcus Marshall	Holden VE Commodore	Garry Rogers Motorsport	2:08.4464
15	47	(Australia) Tim Slade (New Zealand) Daniel Gaunt	Ford FG Falcon	James Rosenberg Racing	2:08.4721
16	15	(Australia) Rick Kelly (Australia) Owen Kelly	Holden VE Commodore	Kelly Racing	2:08.5250
17	18	(Australia) James Moffat (New Zealand) Matt Halliday	Ford FG Falcon	Dick Johnson Racing	2:08.6631
18	8	(Australia) Jason Bright (Australia) Andrew Jones	Holden VE Commodore	Brad Jones Racing	2:08.6681
19	7	(Australia) Todd Kelly (Australia) David Russell	Holden VE Commodore	Kelly Racing	2:08.7271
20	61	(New Zealand) Fabian Coulthard (New Zealand) Craig Baird	Holden VE Commodore	Walkinshaw Racing	2:08.7746
21	14	(Australia) Jason Bargwanna (Australia) Shane Price	Holden VE Commodore	Brad Jones Racing	2:09.1155
22	30	(Australia) Warren Luff (Australia) Nathan Pretty	Holden VE Commodore	Lucas Dumbrell Motorsport	2:09.1503
23	3	(Australia) Tony D'Alberto (Australia) Dale Wood	Ford FG Falcon	Tony D'Alberto Racing	2:09.1503
24	17	(Australia) Steven Johnson (Australia) David Besnard	Ford FG Falcon	Dick Johnson Racing	2:09.3076
25	200	(Australia) Russell Ingall (Australia) Jack Perkins	Holden VE Commodore	Paul Morris Motorsport	2:09.3328
26	19	(Australia) Jonathon Webb (United Kingdom) Richard Lyons	Ford FG Falcon	Tekno Autosports	2:09.4017
27	21	(Australia) Karl Reindler (Australia) David Wall	Holden VE Commodore	Britek Motorsport	2:09.4020
28	12	(Australia) Dean Fiore (Australia) Michael Patrizi	Ford FG Falcon	Triple F Racing	2:10.0191
29	77	(Australia) Grant Denyer (Australia) Cam Waters	Holden VE Commodore	Kelly Racing—Shannons-Mars Racing	2:11.7371

Notes:

^1 – Lee Holdsworth qualified eighth and was eligible to take part in the Top Ten Shootout, but failed to present his car to the race stewards after qualifying and was given a five-place grid penalty. Will Davison was promoted to tenth and the Shootout in his place.

=== Top ten shootout ===
Pos	No	Driver	Team	Time
1	11	(New Zealand) Greg Murphy	Kelly Racing	2:08.8009
2	6	(Australia) Will Davison	Ford Performance Racing	2:08.8821
3	888	(Australia) Craig Lowndes	Triple Eight Race Engineering	2:09.2197
4	1	(Australia) James Courtney	Holden Racing Team	2:09.2359
5	9	(New Zealand) Shane van Gisbergen	Stone Brothers Racing	2:09.3820
6	49	(Australia) Steve Owen	Paul Morris Motorsport	2:09.5177
7	16	(Australia) David Reynolds	Kelly Racing	2:10.1570
8	88	(Australia) Jamie Whincup	Triple Eight Race Engineering	2:26.6012
9	2	(Australia) Garth Tander	Holden Racing Team	2:31.3934
10	5	(Australia) Mark Winterbottom	Ford Performance Racing	2:52.0682

=== Starting grid ===
The following table represents the final starting grid for the race on Sunday:

Inside row			Outside row		
1	(New Zealand) Greg Murphy (Denmark) Allan Simonsen	11	6	(Australia) Will Davison (Australia) Luke Youlden	2
1	Kelly Racing (Holden Commodore VE)		Ford Performance Racing (Ford Falcon FG)		2
3	(Australia) Craig Lowndes (Australia) Mark Skaife	888	1	(Australia) James Courtney (Australia) Cameron McConville	4
3	Triple Eight Race Engineering (Holden Commodore VE)		Holden Racing Team (Holden Commodore VE)		4
5	(New Zealand) Shane van Gisbergen (New Zealand) John McIntyre	9	49	(Australia) Steve Owen (Australia) Paul Morris	6
5	Stone Brothers Racing (Ford Falcon FG)		Paul Morris Motorsport (Holden Commodore VE)		6
7	(Australia) David Reynolds (Australia) Tim Blanchard	16	88	(Australia) Jamie Whincup (Australia) Andrew Thompson	8
7	Kelly Racing (Holden Commodore VE)		Triple Eight Race Engineering (Holden Commodore VE)		8
9	(Australia) Garth Tander (Australia) Nick Percat	2	5	(Australia) Mark Winterbottom (New Zealand) Steven Richards	10
9	Holden Racing Team (Holden Commodore VE)		Ford Performance Racing (Ford Falcon FG)		10
11	(Australia) Paul Dumbrell (Australia) Dean Canto	55	4	(Australia) Alex Davison (Australia) David Brabham	12
11	Rod Nash Racing (Ford Falcon FG)		Stone Brothers Racing (Ford Falcon FG)		12
13	(Australia) Lee Holdsworth (Australia) Greg Ritter	33	34	(Australia) Michael Caruso (Australia) Marcus Marshall	14
13	Garry Rogers Motorsport (Holden Commodore VE)		Garry Rogers Motorsport (Holden Commodore VE)		14
15	(Australia) Tim Slade (New Zealand) Daniel Gaunt	47	15	(Australia) Rick Kelly (Australia) Owen Kelly	16
15	James Rosenberg Racing (Ford Falcon FG)		Kelly Racing (Holden Commodore VE)		16
17	(Australia) James Moffat (New Zealand) Matthew Halliday	18	8	(Australia) Jason Bright (Australia) Andrew Jones	18
17	Dick Johnson Racing (Ford Falcon FG)		Brad Jones Racing (Holden Commodore VE)		18
19	(Australia) Todd Kelly (Australia) David Russell	7	61	(New Zealand) Fabian Coulthard (New Zealand) Craig Baird	20
19	Kelly Racing (Holden Commodore VE)		Walkinshaw Racing (Holden Commodore VE)		20
21	(Australia) Jason Bargwanna (Australia) Shane Price	14	30	(Australia) Warren Luff (Australia) Nathan Pretty	22
21	Brad Jones Racing (Holden Commodore VE)		Lucas Dumbrell Motorsport (Holden Commodore VE)		22
23	(Australia) Tony D'Alberto (Australia) Dale Wood	3	17	(Australia) Steven Johnson (Australia) David Besnard	24
23	Tony D'Alberto Racing (Ford Falcon FG)		Dick Johnson Racing (Ford Falcon FG)		24
25	(Australia) Russell Ingall (Australia) Jack Perkins	200	19	(Australia) Jonathon Webb (United Kingdom) Richard Lyons	26
25	Paul Morris Motorsport (Holden Commodore VE)		Tekno Autosports (Ford Falcon FG)		26
27	(Australia) Karl Reindler (Australia) David Wall	21	12	(Australia) Dean Fiore (Australia) Michael Patrizi	28
27	Britek Motorsport (Holden Commodore VE)		Triple F Racing (Ford Falcon FG)		28
29	(Australia) Grant Denyer (Australia) Cam Waters	77			
29	Kelly Racing (Holden Commodore VE)				

=== Race results ===
Pos	No	Driver	Car	Team	Laps	Time/Retired	Grid	Points
1	2	(Australia) Garth Tander (Australia) Nick Percat	Holden VE Commodore	Holden Racing Team	161	6:26:52.2691	9	300
2	888	(Australia) Craig Lowndes (Australia) Mark Skaife	Holden VE Commodore	Triple Eight Race Engineering	161	+0.3s	3	276
3	11	(New Zealand) Greg Murphy (Denmark) Allan Simonsen	Holden VE Commodore	Kelly Racing	161	+11.8s	1	258
4	5	(Australia) Mark Winterbottom (New Zealand) Steven Richards	Ford FG Falcon	Ford Performance Racing	161	+19.5s	10	240
5	8	(Australia) Jason Bright (Australia) Andrew Jones	Holden VE Commodore	Brad Jones Racing	161	+19.9s	18	222
6	9	(New Zealand) Shane van Gisbergen (New Zealand) John McIntyre	Ford FG Falcon	Stone Brothers Racing	161	+33.6s	5	204
7	1	(Australia) James Courtney (Australia) Cameron McConville	Holden VE Commodore	Holden Racing Team	161	+36.2s	4	192
8	200	(Australia) Russell Ingall (Australia) Jack Perkins	Holden VE Commodore	Paul Morris Motorsport	161	+37.2s	25	180
9	3	(Australia) Tony D'Alberto (Australia) Dale Wood	Ford FG Falcon	Tony D'Alberto Racing	161	+41.6s	23	168
10	34	(Australia) Michael Caruso (Australia) Marcus Marshall	Holden VE Commodore	Garry Rogers Motorsport	161	+47.8s	14	156
11	49	(Australia) Steve Owen (Australia) Paul Morris	Holden VE Commodore	Paul Morris Motorsport	161	+49.7s	6	144
12	47	(Australia) Tim Slade (New Zealand) Daniel Gaunt	Ford FG Falcon	James Rosenberg Racing	161	+50.1s	15	138
13	19	(Australia) Jonathon Webb (United Kingdom) Richard Lyons	Ford FG Falcon	Tekno Autosports	161	+50.9s	26	132
14	21	(Australia) Karl Reindler (Australia) David Wall	Holden VE Commodore	Britek Motorsport	161	+55.3s	27	126
15	30	(Australia) Warren Luff (Australia) Nathan Pretty	Holden VE Commodore	Lucas Dumbrell Motorsport	161	+1m 4.8s	22	120
16	4	(Australia) Alex Davison (Australia) David Brabham	Ford FG Falcon	Stone Brothers Racing	161	+1m 11.8s	12	114
17	33	(Australia) Lee Holdsworth (Australia) Greg Ritter	Holden VE Commodore	Garry Rogers Motorsport	161	+1m 37.6s	13	108
18	6	(Australia) Will Davison (Australia) Luke Youlden	Ford FG Falcon	Ford Performance Racing	161	+1m 48.3s	2	102
19	16	(Australia) David Reynolds (Australia) Tim Blanchard	Holden VE Commodore	Kelly Racing	161	+2m 3.3s	7	96
20	12	(Australia) Dean Fiore (Australia) Michael Patrizi	Ford FG Falcon	Triple F Racing	160	+ 1 lap	28	90
21	88	(Australia) Jamie Whincup (Australia) Andrew Thompson	Holden VE Commodore	Triple Eight Race Engineering	160	+ 1 lap	8	84
22	15	(Australia) Rick Kelly (Australia) Owen Kelly	Holden VE Commodore	Kelly Racing	159	+ 2 laps	16	78
23	14	(Australia) Jason Bargwanna (Australia) Shane Price	Holden VE Commodore	Brad Jones Racing	158	+ 3 laps	21	72
24	7	(Australia) Todd Kelly (Australia) David Russell	Holden VE Commodore	Kelly Racing	154	+ 7 laps	19	66
25	18	(Australia) James Moffat (New Zealand) Matt Halliday	Ford FG Falcon	Dick Johnson Racing	146	+ 15 laps	17	60
Ret	55	(Australia) Paul Dumbrell (Australia) Dean Canto	Ford FG Falcon	Ford Performance Racing	144	Throttle	11	
Ret	17	(Australia) Steven Johnson (Australia) David Besnard	Ford FG Falcon	Dick Johnson Racing	112	Accident	24	
Ret	77	(Australia) Grant Denyer (Australia) Cam Waters	Holden VE Commodore	Kelly Racing	95	Not Classified (Insufficient Laps)	29	
Ret	61	(New Zealand) Fabian Coulthard (New Zealand) Craig Baird	Holden VE Commodore	Walkinshaw Racing	13	Accident	20	

== Championship standings ==
- After 20 of 28 races, the top five positions in the 2011 V8 Supercars Championship drivers standings were as follows:

Pos	No	Name	Team	Points
1	888	Craig Lowndes	Triple Eight Race Engineering	2329
2	88	Jamie Whincup	Triple Eight Race Engineering	2229
3	9	Shane van Gisbergen	Stone Brothers Racing	1920
4	2	Garth Tander	Holden Racing Team	1848
5	5	Mark Winterbottom	Ford Performance Racing	1687

== Broadcast ==
The race was covered by the Seven Network in Australia for the fifth consecutive season. The race saw expanded international television coverage with United States-based cable channel Speed broadcast the race live throughout North America, the first time a V8 Supercar race had been televised live on the continent. Speed's decision to broadcast this race, as well as the Gold Coast 600, came on the heels of the series' announcement that it would stage a round in the United States, beginning in 2013.

Seven Network	Speed
Booth: Neil Crompton, Matthew White; Pit-lane: Mark Beretta, Mark Larkham; Supports: Aaron Noonan	Booth: Mike Joy, Darrell Waltrip; Pit-lane: Leigh Diffey, Calvin Fish
