= Iron Chef Australia =

- Genre: Cooking, Game show
- Presented by: Grant Denyer; Mark Dacascos
- Starring: Richard Cornish (commentator)
- Judges: Larissa Dubecki; Simon Thomsen; Leo Schofield
- Country of origin: Australia
- Original language: English
- No. of seasons: 1
- No. of episodes: 6

Production
- Producer: Shine Australia
- Production locations: Docklands Studios Melbourne, Docklands, Melbourne, Australia
- Camera setup: Multi-camera
- Running time: 60 minutes

Original release
- Network: Seven Network
- Release: 19 October – 23 November 2010

Related
- Iron Chef; Iron Chef America

Iron Chef Australia is an Australian cooking show based on the Japanese show Iron Chef, as well as its American adaptation Iron Chef America. The program is a sort of culinary game show, with each episode seeing a challenger chef competing against one of the resident "Iron Chefs" in a one-hour cooking competition based on a theme ingredient.

The show was put into production by the Seven Network mainly to capitalise on the success of the Network Ten cooking show MasterChef Australia, and is produced by that show's current production company Shine Australia. It premiered on Seven on 19 October 2010.

== Overview ==
Iron Chef Australia features production design and presentation similar to Iron Chef America. In addition Mark Dacascos reprises his role as The chairman from Iron Chef America. The show is recorded at Docklands Studios in Melbourne.

In contrast to previous versions of the format, the show features a static judging panel composed of food critics Larissa Dubecki, Simon Thomsen and Leo Schofield. The programme is hosted by Grant Denyer, with additional commentary provided by Richard Cornish.

== The Iron Chefs ==
Iron Chef	Specialty	Win	Loss	Draw	Total	Win %
Guillaume Brahimi	French	2	0	0	2	100%
Guy Grossi	Italian	1	1	0	2	50.0%
Neil Perry	Asian	2	0	0	2	100%

== Results ==
Episode	Airdate	Iron Chef	Challenger	Theme Ingredient	Winner
1	19 October 2010	Neil Perry	Matt Stone	Coconut	Neil Perry
2	26 October 2010	Guy Grossi	Judyta Slupnicki	Duck	Guy Grossi
3	2 November 2010	Guillaume Brahimi	Chris Badenoch	Chocolate	Guillaume Brahimi
4	9 November 2010	Guy Grossi	Herb Faust	Lamb	Herb Faust
5	16 November 2010	Neil Perry	Sasha Meier	Squid	Neil Perry
6	23 November 2010	Guillaume Brahimi	Dan Hong	Fungi	Guillaume Brahimi

== Reception ==
The premiere episode of the show debuted with an average of 1.129 million viewers, coming in seventh in ratings for the night. It competed against and was bettered by Top Gear Australia, another Australian adaptation of a popular international TV series.

== See also ==
- List of Australian television series
- List of cooking shows
