= Grant Denyer =

Australian television/radio presenter and motor racing driver

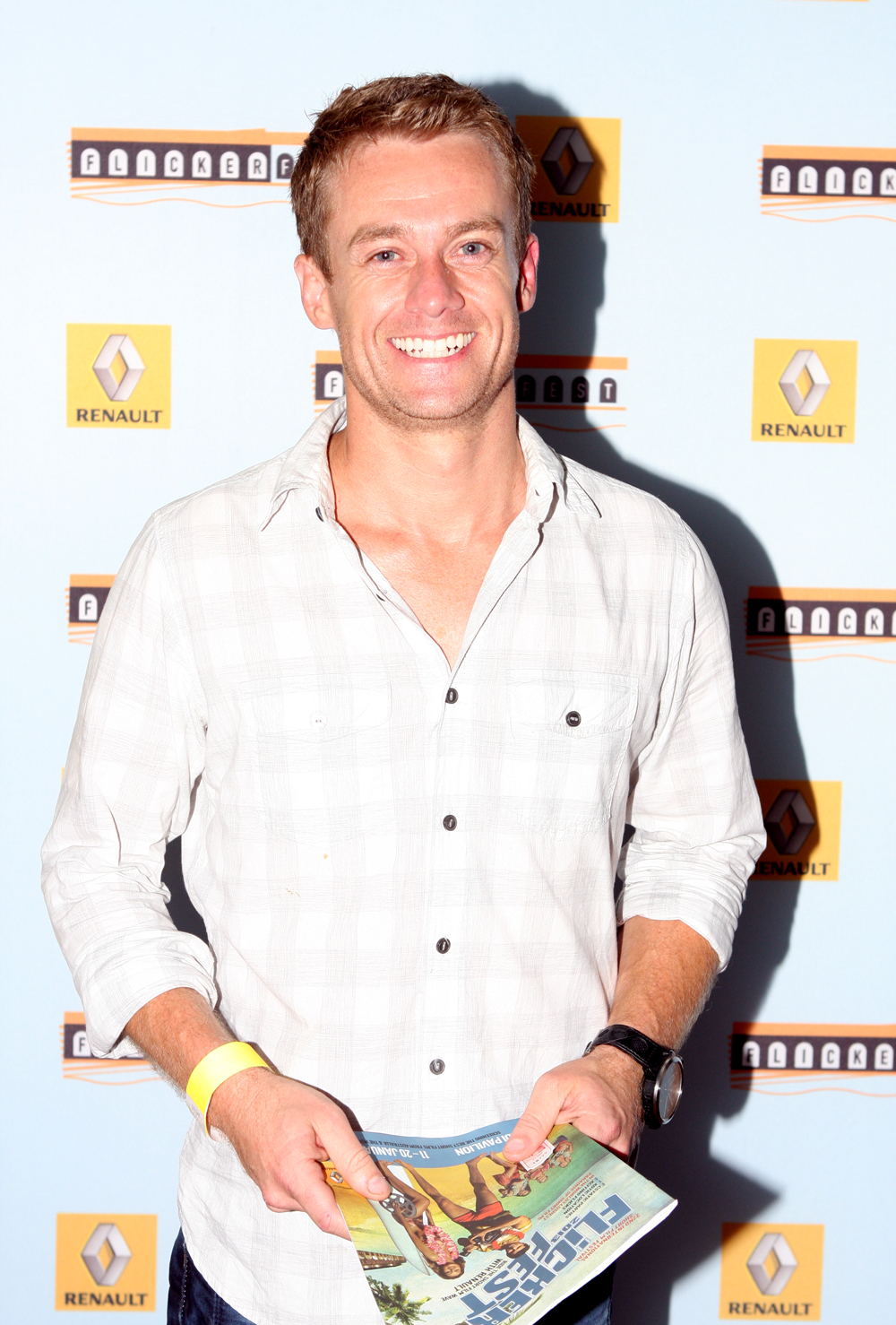
- Denyer in 2013
- Born: Grant Craig Denyer; 12 September 1977 (age 49); Gosford, New South Wales, Australia
- Occupations: Television and radio presenter; Motor racing driver
- Years active: 1997−present
- Employer: Network 10
- Known for: Family Feud; Dancing with the Stars; Celebrity Name Game; Deal or No Deal
- Spouse: Cheryl Rogers (m. 2010)
- Children: 3
- Website: grantdenyer.com.au

Grant Craig Denyer (born 12 September 1977) is an Australian television and radio presenter and motor racing driver. He has worked for several television networks, including Seven Network and Network 10, mostly serving as a presenter. He previously hosted Family Feud and Australia's Got Talent. Currently, he hosts Channel 10's main game show Deal or No Deal.

In 2018, he won a Gold Logie Award for Most Popular Personality on Australian Television.

== Television career ==
In 1997, Denyer began his career in the media with a position at Prime Television in Wagga Wagga as a news reporter and journalist. He moved to Sydney to work as V8 Supercar pit reporter for Network Ten, when he caught the eye of television producer Adam Boland.

Boland saw the potential in Denyer and offered him full-time position as the weather presenter on the relaunched Sunrise program from 2004 until the end of 2006. Denyer left this position in December 2006 due to wanting to spend more time with his family, though he remained as a roving reporter for the breakfast program Sunrise.

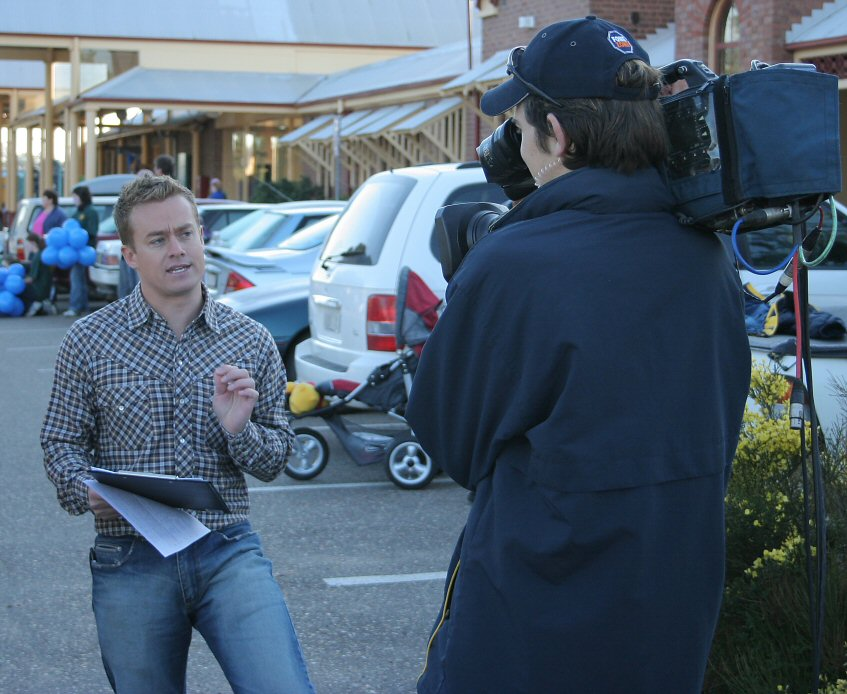
Denyer filming a weather segment for Sunrise

Denyer won the fourth series of Dancing with the Stars and also hosted the celebrity duet singing competition It Takes Two from 2006 to 2008. He has also presented All Time Greatest Aussie Bloopers, Guinness World Records with co-host Shelley Craft and Australia's Got Talent. He is the holder of five official Guinness World Records.

From 2006 to 2011, he was the host of Carols in the Domain in Sydney.

In 2007, his race and television career saw him both racing and being a part of the commentary team featuring Neil Crompton, Matthew White, Mark Beretta and Daniel Gibson to report on the V8 Supercar Series.

In January 2010, Denyer returned to Sunrise as weather presenter, succeeding Fifi Box who became Entertainment editor. Grant remained weather presenter until he resigned in March 2013 to spend more time with his family. He also hosted the short-lived Iron Chef Australia, in 2010.

In late 2013, Denyer hosted Slide Show. He hosted a series of Million Dollar Minute which first aired on 16 September 2013. On 29 November 2013, Denyer resigned due to 'family reasons' and he was replaced by Weekend Sunrise sports presenter Simon Reeve.

In 2014, Denyer joined Network Ten as the host of a revived version of game show Family Feud. Denyer has described himself as a "workaholic".

In 2015, Denyer co-hosted The Great Australian Spelling Bee alongside Chrissie Swan.

In 2016, he also had a guest appearance on Neighbours for Family Feud on episode 7477.

In 2018, Denyer hosted an Australian version of Game of Games.

In 2019, Denyer co-hosted Dancing with the Stars alongside Amanda Keller and hosted Celebrity Name Game.

In 2021, he appeared as a contestant on the seventh season of Network 10's I'm a Celebrity...Get Me Out of Here! Australia. He ended up placing second overall, behind winner Abbie Chatfield.

In 2023, Denyer competed on the seventh season of The Amazing Race Australia with his wife, Cheryl. In the second leg of the race in Agra, India, he collapsed due to the extreme heat, reaching 45 °C (113 °F). He had to be driven to the pit stop for that leg of the race after all other racers had finished, and was subsequently bedridden for seven weeks afterwards. He speculated this was due to his severe mould allergy, as one of the challenges involved handling cow manure.

In 2023, Denyer was announced as the new host of Deal or No Deal for Network 10 replacing Andrew O'Keefe. It premiered on 29 January 2024.

=== Television ===
| Year | Title | Role | Notes |
|---|---|---|---|
| 2004–2006, 2010–2013 | Sunrise | Weather presenter | |
| 2005 | Australia's Guinness World Records | Host | |
| 2006 | Dancing with the Stars | Contestant | Winner |
| 2006 | Deal or No Deal (Andrew O'Keefe) | Contestant, wins $1,000 for a home viewer, which in case #4 | |
| 2006–2008 | It Takes Two | Host | |
| 2006–2011 | Carols in the Domain | Co-host | |
| 2007–2012 | Australia's Got Talent | Host | |
| 2010 | Iron Chef Australia | Co-host | |
| 2013 | SlideShow | Host | |
| 2013 | Million Dollar Minute | Host | Original host |
| 2014–2020 | Family Feud | Host | |
| 2015, 2018, 2024 | Have You Been Paying Attention? | Guest quiz master | |
| 2015–2016 | The Great Australian Spelling Bee | Co-host | with Chrissie Swan |
| 2016–2018 | All Star Family Feud | Host | |
| 2016 | Neighbours | Himself | Episode 7477, appeared as host of Family Feud |
| 2018 | Game of Games | Host | |
| 2019–2020 | Dancing with the Stars | Co-host | with Amanda Keller |
| 2019 | Chris & Julia's Sunday Night Takeaway | Guest | |
| 2019 | Hughesy, We Have a Problem | Celebrity problem | |
| 2019–2020 | Celebrity Name Game | Host | |
| 2020 | Drunk History | Captain Thunderbolt | |
| 2021 | I'm a Celebrity...Get Me Out of Here! | Contestant | |
| 2022 | Dancing with the Stars | Contestant | Winner |
| 2022 | The Chase Australia: Celebrity special | Contestant | |
| 2024–present | Deal or No Deal | Host | |

=== Awards ===
Denyer has been nominated four times for the Logie Award for Best Presenter award at the TV Week Logie Awards. He was nominated in 2007, 2008 and 2009 for his roles on It Takes Two and on Australia's Got Talent (in 2009). He was nominated again in 2015 for his role in Family Feud.

In 2006, Denyer was recognised by voters in the TV Fugly Awards as being Australia's Spunkiest Male TV Personality. Grant has been voted "sexiest presenter on TV" by a Melbourne Metro magazine poll, and he was voted the most datable male by (Australian) New Woman magazine.

In 2016, Denyer won the silver Logie award for Best Entertainment Program for Family Feud.

In 2018, Denyer was nominated for a Gold Logie for the third year in a row, which he won, as well as winning Logie Award for Most Popular Presenter.

== Radio career ==
In December 2017, Southern Cross Austereo announced that Denyer would be joining 2Day FM to host the Em, Grant and Ed breakfast show with comedians Em Rusciano and Ed Kavalee. Ash London joined the show in 2019 replacing Rusciano.

In August 2019, Southern Cross Austereo announced that Grant, Ed and Ash would finish on Friday 16 August due to taking a 'new direction'. Grant, Ed and Ash was replaced by a music focused show.

On 3 October 2019, it was announced that Denyer would host a new radio show with Yvie Jones in December, the Grant and Yvie Show, a Summer breakfast show that would air in Hit Network's major metro markets, except 2Day FM in Sydney.

== Recording career ==
In December 2018, Denyer released his debut single, "Driving Home for Christmas".

== Motor racing ==
Grant Denyer
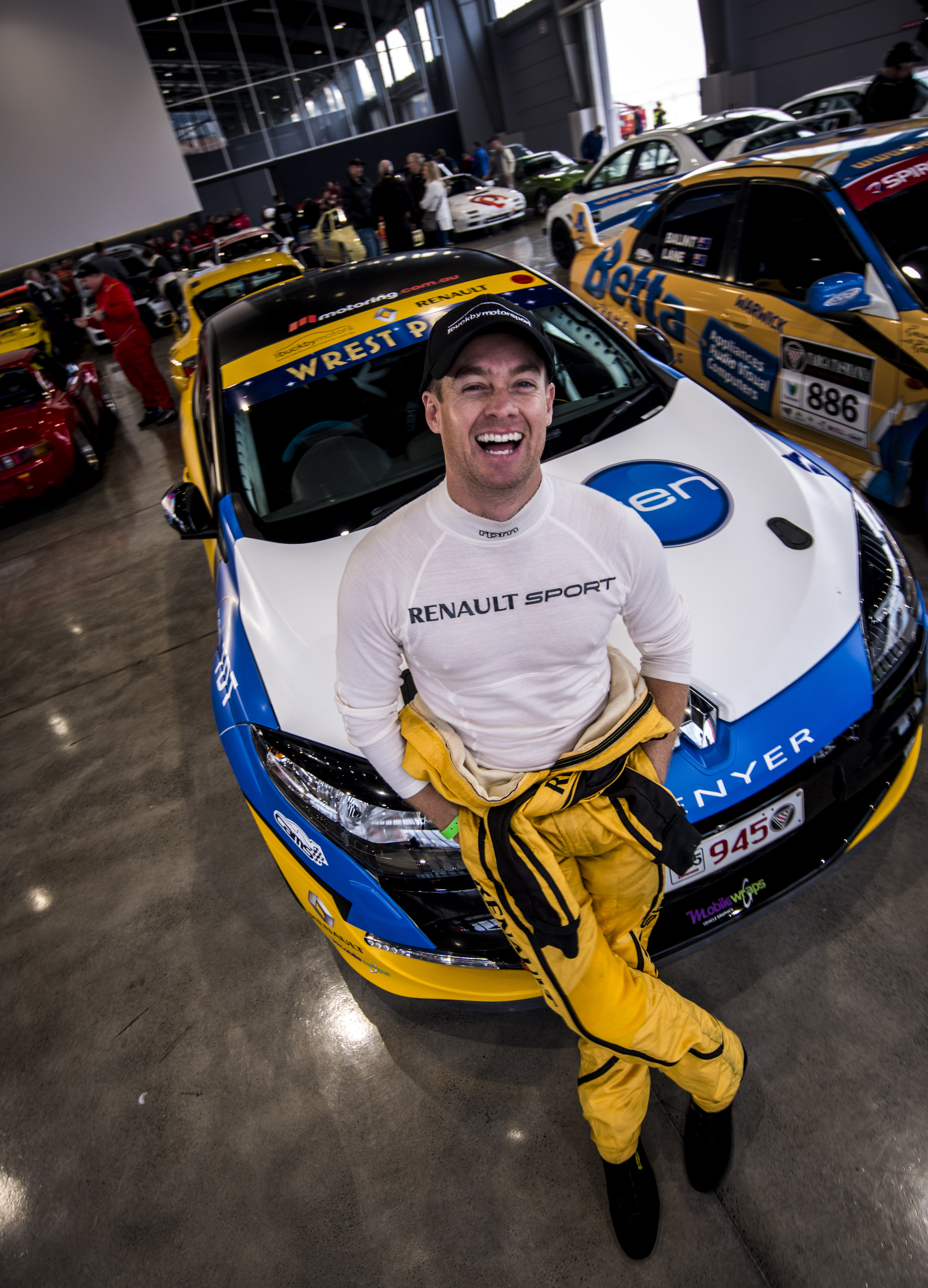
- Denyer with his 2012 Renault Mégane RS265 at the 2015 Targa Tasmania
- Relatives: Craig Denyer (father)

Supercars Dunlop Series Australian GT Championship
- Years active: 2005–2016
- Teams: Dick Johnson Racing; Speed FX Racing; MW Motorsport; Tekno Autosports
- Starts: 75
- Wins: 4
- Best finish: 4th in 2009 Fujitsu V8 Supercar Series

Previous series
- 2001–2005 2005–2016 2006–2011 2008–2009 2015: V8 Utes; V8 Supercar Development Series; V8 Supercars; Australian Mini Challenge; Australian GT Championship

Championship titles
- 2004 2016: V8 Utes Summer Series; Australian Endurance Championship

Awards
- 2005: Mike Kable V8 Supercar Rookie of the Year

Denyer drove a Ford Falcon in the Fujitsu V8 Supercar series for Speed FX Racing with Michael Caruso and Daniel Elliot. He debuted with Dick Johnson Racing in 2005. In the same year, he was awarded the Mike Kable Rookie of the Year prize finishing his debut season in the top-ten (tenth).

In 2006, Denyer raced in the Sandown 500 and the prestigious Bathurst 1000 with DJR and with Alex Davison. Denyer and Alex came 9th overall at Bathurst. Denyer also had success in tarmac rallying, achieving a podium finish in 2007's Suncoast Rally in which he drove the Les Walkden-prepared Subaru Impreza WRX STi. He finished 37.8 seconds behind the Skelta G-Force of Ray Vandersee, and 3.6 seconds clear third place-getter, Matt Close, in his Porsche Turbo. Going into the final stage, he trailed Close by 4.7 seconds, and moved ahead of the Porsche to take second place.

In 2002, Denyer competed in the Bathurst 24-hour Endurance Event, he drove a Nissan 200SX. In 2003 he competed in the same event, this time driving a Porsche 996 GT3 finishing second in his class, sixth overall.

Denyer won his first ever Supercars race in the Development Series at Sandown on 7 June 2008 in the second race of the weekend. More wins came and Denyer had his best season in 2009, finishing fourth in the 2009 Fujitsu V8 Supercar Series.

In early 2010, Denyer stated he would no longer be pursuing full season drives in motorsport, however in 2011, Denyer was announced as the lead driver of Shannons-Mars Racing, a V8 Supercar team formed for the purposes of a TV show, the Shannons Supercar Showdown. Denyer's Bathurst 1000 co-driver was Cam Waters, winning the competition beating runner-up British racing driver Andrew Jordan. Waters as of 2016 became a full-time Supercars regular with ProDrive.

Denyer also competed in the Australian GT Championship with Maranello Motorsport in 2015, but switched to the McLaren 650S fielded by Tekno Autosports, sometimes in partnership with car owner and eventual 2016 Bathurst 1000 champion Jonathon Webb, in the GT series. In 2016 Denyer won the Australian Endurance Championship, an offshoot of the GT Championship, with Nathan Morcom.

=== Career results ===
Source of results is Driver Database.

| Season | Series | Position | Car | Competitor / team |
|---|---|---|---|---|
| 2001 | V8 Brute Muster | 5th | Ford Falcon XR8 | VIP Pet Foods Racing |
| 2002 | V8 Brute Muster | 4th | Ford Falcon XR8 | VIP Pet Foods Racing |
| 2003 | Australian V8 Brutes Series | 7th | Ford Falcon XR8 | VIP Pet Foods Racing |
| 2004 | V8 Brute Championship | 11th | Ford Falcon XR8 | VIP Pet Foods Racing |
| 2004 | V8 Utes Australia Summer Series | 1st | Ford Falcon XR8 | VIP Pet Foods Racing |
| 2005 | Holden Performance Driving Centre V8 Supercar Series | 10th | Ford BA Falcon | Dick Johnson Racing |
| 2006 | Fujitsu V8 Supercar Series | 9th | Ford BA Falcon | Dick Johnson Racing |
| 2006 | V8 Supercar Championship Series | 42nd | Ford BA Falcon | Dick Johnson Racing |
| 2007 | Fujitsu V8 Supercar Series | 28th | Ford BA Falcon | Ford Rising Stars Racing; MW Motorsport |
| 2007 | V8 Supercar Championship Series | 51st | Ford BA Falcon | WPS Racing |
| 2008 | Australian Mini Challenge | 6th | Mini Cooper JCW R56 Challenge | Decorug Racing |
| 2008 | Fujitsu V8 Supercar Series | 15th | Ford BA Falcon | MW Motorsport |
| 2008 | V8 Supercar Championship Series | 55th | Ford BF Falcon | Ford Rising Stars Racing |
| 2009 | Australian Mini Challenge | 5th | Mini Cooper JCW R56 Challenge | Decorug Racing |
| 2009 | Fujitsu V8 Supercar Series | 4th | Ford BF Falcon | Dick Johnson Racing |
| 2011 | Fujitsu V8 Supercar Series | 33rd | Holden VE Commodore | Kelly Racing |
| 2011 | International V8 Supercars Championship | NC | Holden VE Commodore | Kelly Racing |
| 2014 | Aussie Racing Cars Super Series | 40th | ARC Euro GT Yamaha | MARC Cars Australia |
| 2015 | Australian GT Championship | 2nd | Ferrari 458 Italia GT3 | Maranello Motorsport |
| 2015 | Dunlop V8 Supercar Series | 31st | Ford FG Falcon | Image Racing |
| 2016 | Australian Endurance Championship | 1st | McLaren 650S GT3 | Tekno Autosports |
| 2016 | Dunlop V8 Supercar Series | 27th | Holden VE Commodore | Eggleston Motorsport |
| 2018 | Australian Production Car Championship | 3rd | Lotus Exige 350 Sport | Simply Sports Cars |

=== Complete Bathurst 1000 results ===
| Year | Team | Car | Co-driver | Position | Laps |
|---|---|---|---|---|---|
| 2006 | Dick Johnson Racing | Ford Falcon BA | (Australia) Alex Davison | 9th | 161 |
| 2007 | WPS Racing | Ford Falcon BF | (Australia) Michael Caruso | 15th | 159 |
| 2011 | Kelly Racing | Holden Commodore VE | (Australia) Cam Waters | DNF | 95 |

=== Complete Bathurst 24 Hour results ===
| Year | Team | Co-drivers | Car | Class | Laps | Overall position | Class position |
|---|---|---|---|---|---|---|---|
| 2002 | (Australia) Donut King Racing | (United Kingdom) Tony Quinn (Australia) Tony Alford (Australia) John Grounds | Nissan 200SX Spec-R | 5 | 426 | 18th | 6th |
| 2003 | (Australia) VIP Petfoods Racing | (United Kingdom) Tony Quinn (Australia) Klark Quinn (Australia) Marcus Marshall | Porsche 996 GT3 Cup | B | 495 | 6th | 2nd |

=== Complete Bathurst 12 Hour results ===
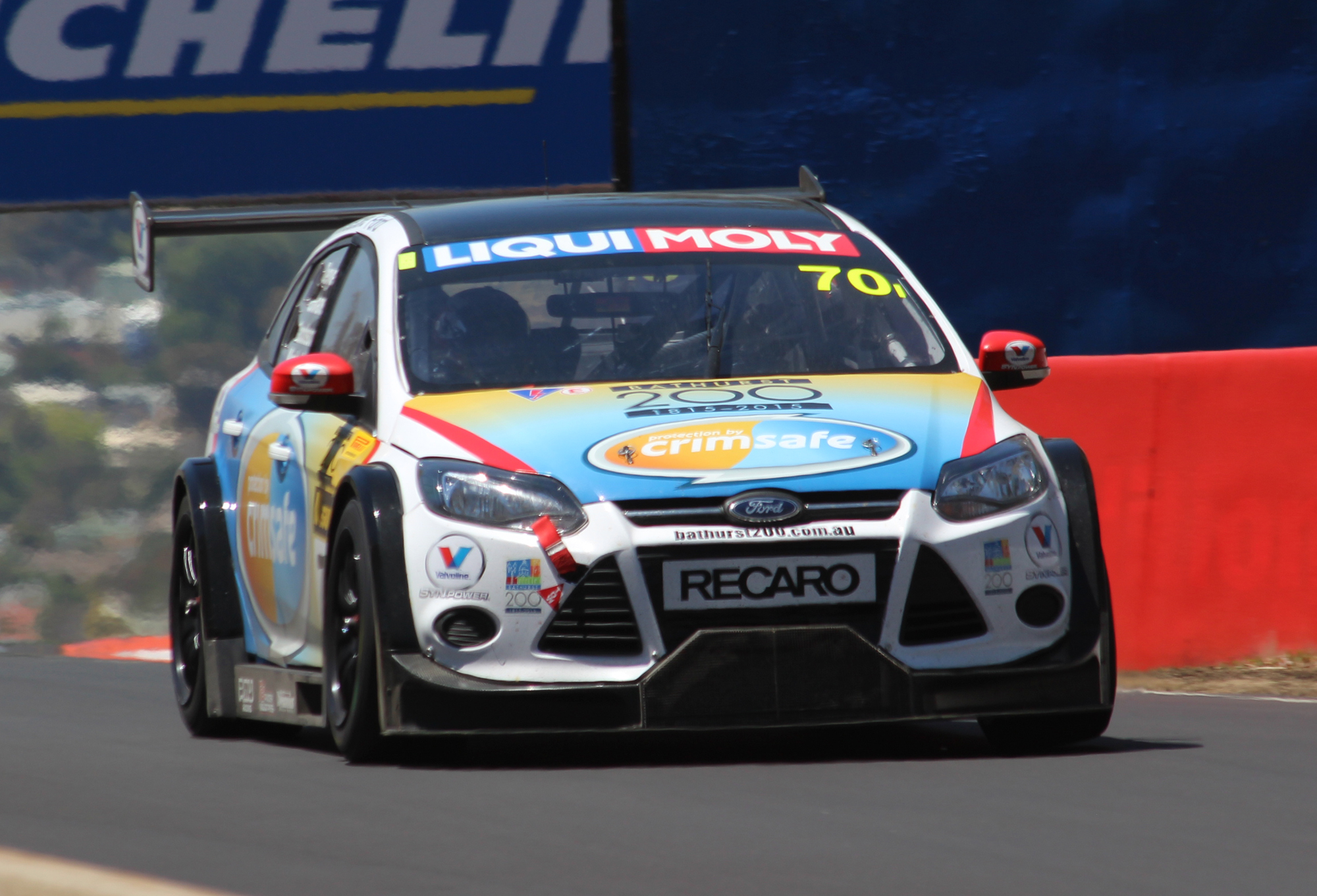
The Class I-winning MARC Focus GTC of Grant Denyer, Adam Gowans, Garry Jacobson and Andrew Miedecke at the 2014 Liqui Moly Bathurst 12 Hour

| Year | Team | Co-drivers | Car | Class | Laps | Overall position | Class position |
|---|---|---|---|---|---|---|---|
| 2007 | Subaru Australia | (Australia) Chris Alajajian (Australia) Neil Crompton | Subaru Impreza WRX Sti Spec C | B | 248 | 5th | 3rd |
| 2008 | (Australia) VIP Petfoods Racing | (United Kingdom) Tony Quinn (Australia) Klark Quinn | Mitsubishi Lancer Evo IX | A | 253 | 2nd | 2nd |
| 2009 | (Australia) VIP Petfoods Racing | (United Kingdom) Tony Quinn (Australia) Klark Quinn | Mitsubishi Lancer RS Evo IX | C | 98 | DNF | |
| 2014 | MARC Cars Australia Pty Ltd | (Australia) Adam Gowans (Australia) Garry Jacobson (Australia) Andrew Miedecke | MARC Focus GTC | I | 268 | 15th | 1st |
| 2015 | (Australia) Peter Conroy Motorsport | (Australia) Tony Bates (Australia) Peter Conroy | Porsche 997 GT3 Cup | B | 36 | DNF | |
| 2016 | (Australia) Maranello Motorsport | (Australia) Tony D'Alberto (Finland) Mika Salo (Finland) Toni Vilander | Ferrari 458 GT3 | AP | 63 | DNF | |
| 2017 | (Australia) Keltic Racing | (Australia) Klark Quinn (United Kingdom) Tony Quinn (New Zealand) Andrew Waite | McLaren 650S GT3 | AAM | 95 | DNF | |
| 2018 | MARC Cars Australia | (Australia) Garry Jacobson (Australia) Tyler Everingham | MARC Mazda 3 V8 | I | 244 | 25th | 2nd |
| 2020 | (Australia) Trofeo Motorsport | (Australia) Dean Canto (Australia) Liam Talbot (Australia) Marcel Zalloua | Lamborghini Huracán GT3 | S | 300 | 19th | 4th |
| 2022 | (Australia) Wall Racing | (Australia) Tony D'Alberto (Australia) David Wall (Australia) Adrian Deitz | Lamborghini Huracán GT3 Evo | APA | 286 | 5th | 5th |
| 2023 | (Australia) Wall Racing | (Australia) Tony D'Alberto (Australia) David Wall (Australia) Adrian Deitz | Lamborghini Huracán GT3 Evo | S | 70 | DNF | |
| 2024 | (Australia) Wall Racing | (Australia) Tony D'Alberto (Australia) David Wall (Australia) Adrian Deitz | Lamborghini Huracán GT3 Evo 2 | S | 273 | 12th | 1st |
| 2025 | (Australia) Wall Racing | (Australia) Tony D'Alberto (Australia) Adrian Deitz (New Zealand) Brendon Leitch | Lamborghini Huracán GT3 Evo 2 | S | 303 | 9th | 1st |

=== Complete Bathurst 6 Hour results ===
| Year | Team | Co-drivers | Car | Class | Laps | Overall position | Class position |
|---|---|---|---|---|---|---|---|
| 2021 | (Australia) Keltic Racing | (United Kingdom) Tony Quinn (Australia) Tim Miles | Ford Mustang GT | A2 | 29 | DNF | |
| 2022 | (Australia) Keltic Racing | (United Kingdom) Tony Quinn | Ford Mustang GT | A2 | 128 | 8th | 1st |
| 2023 | (Australia) Local Legends | (United Kingdom) Tony Quinn | Ford Mustang Mach 1 | A2 | 112 | 7th | 1st |
| 2024 | (Australia) Game Over | (United Kingdom) Tony Quinn (Australia) Ryder Quinn | Ford Mustang Mach 1 | A2 | 99 | DNF | |
| 2025 | (Australia) Game Over | (United Kingdom) Tony Quinn (Australia) Ryder Quinn | Chevrolet Camaro 2SS | A2 | 47 | DNF | |
| 2026 | (Australia) Game Over | (United Kingdom) Tony Quinn (Australia) Ryder Quinn | Chevrolet Camaro 2SS | A2 | 71 | DNF | |

=== Motorsport external links ===
- Grant Denyer at Supercars Official
- Grant Denyer career summary at DriverDB.com
- Grant Denyer driver statistics at Racing-Reference
- Grant Denyer at Third Turn

== Personal life ==
Denyer was born in Gosford, New South Wales. After the separation of his parents at the age of 13, Denyer moved to Hallam, Victoria, and attended the multicultural Hallam High School. Grant spent his holidays at the Denyer family farm at Ariah Park, New South Wales.

He is married to TV producer Cheryl Rogers, who is the founder of Mummy Time. They have three daughters.

=== 2008 injury ===
On 17 September 2008, Denyer injured his back whilst participating in a monster truck promotional event. He suffered a compressed fracture of the lower vertebrae, and was taken by ambulance to Wollongong Hospital.

The accident occurred while Denyer was in training for the Monster Truck Championships, driving a monster truck at Groundz Precinct, Dapto. After practising a jump over five cars in the truck, Denyer removed his foot too soon from the accelerator which caused the vehicle to land heavily; his lower vertebrae was broken in eight places. He was moved to a Sydney hospital, and his recovery took months. He was reported as saying that his injury had reduced his rather short size (5’4, 164cm) by 1 cm.

Denyer was then moved into intensive care, but there were no signs of any nerve damage or serious injuries, so he was back on the air to host Australia's Got Talent in 2009; however, he did not return to It Takes Two in May.

== Controversies ==
In 2017, Denyer was banned from appearing on the radio stations Triple M and KIIS 106.5 after he used a story told by former rugby league player Matthew Johns on Triple M as his own an hour later on KISS 106.5. On the Triple M show The Grill Team, on which Denyer was a guest, Johns recounted about how he tried playing the board game Test Match with his children. Denyer later appeared on The Kyle and Jackie O Show on KIIS where he repeated the tale as his own. Johns later expressed his dismay to Kyle Sandilands on The Kyle and Jackie O Show and both hosts agreed to ban Denyer from ever appearing on either station.

Denyer's 2018 Gold Logie win has proved controversial, with people (including Russell Crowe) believing he only won because of Tom Gleeson's campaign. Gleeson has denied these suggestions.

Sporting positions
| Preceded by Grant Sherrin | Australian Endurance Championship; Champion; 2016 | Succeeded by Peter Hackett; Dominic Storey |
Awards and achievements
| Preceded by Warren Luff | Mike Kable Young Gun Award; 2005 | Succeeded by James Courtney |
| Preceded by Ada Nicodemou & Aric Yegudkin | Dancing with the Stars (Australia) winner Season 4 (Early 2006 with Amanda Garner) | Succeeded by Anthony Koutoufides & Natalie Lowe |
| Preceded by Samuel Johnson for Molly (Seven Network) | Gold Logie Award; Most Popular Personality on Australian Television; 2018 for All Star Family Feud and Family Feud (Network Ten) | Succeeded by Tom Gleeson for Hard Quiz (ABC) |
