= 2023 SuperUtes Series =

Australian motorsport championship

The 2023 V8 SuperUte Series was an Australian motor racing competition for V8 SuperUtes. It was the fifth running of the SuperUtes Series.

The series was won by Aaron Borg driving an Isuzu D-Max.

== Calendar ==
The 2023 SuperUtes calendar was confirmed on 12 December 2022. A non-championship round in Adelaide was added in October 2023.

Rd.	Circuit	City / State	Date	Map
1	(Western Australia) Wanneroo Raceway	Neerabup, Western Australia	28–30 April	2023 SuperUtes Series is located in Australia
2	(New South Wales) Sydney Motorsport Park	Eastern Creek, New South Wales	28–30 July	2023 SuperUtes Series is located in Australia
3	(South Australia) The Bend Motorsport Park	Tailem Bend, South Australia	18–20 August	2023 SuperUtes Series is located in Australia
4	(Victoria (state)) Sandown Raceway	Springvale, Victoria	15–17 September	2023 SuperUtes Series is located in Australia
5	(New South Wales) Mount Panorama Circuit	Bathurst, New South Wales	5–8 October	2023 SuperUtes Series is located in Australia
6	(Queensland) Surfers Paradise Street Circuit	Gold Coast, Queensland	27–29 October	2023 SuperUtes Series is located in Australia
NC	(South Australia) Adelaide Street Circuit	Adelaide, South Australia	25–26 November	2023 SuperUtes Series is located in Australia

== Entries ==
Manufacturer	Model	Entrant	No.	Driver Name	Rounds
Ford	Ranger	Allgate Motorsport	49	(Australia) Christopher Formosa	2
Ford	Ranger	EFS 4x4 Accessories	58	(Australia) Ryal Harris	4-6
Ford	Ranger	World's Best Technology	68	(Australia) Gerard Maggs	1–2
Holden	Colorado	Go Sunny Solar	19	(Australia) George Gutierrez	All
Holden	Colorado	Go Sunny Solar	41	(Australia) Adrian Cottrell	All
Isuzu	D-Max	Sieders Racing Team	1	(Australia) Aaron Borg	1–2, 4-6
Isuzu	D-Max	Bendix Racing	5	(Australia) David Casey	All
Isuzu	D-Max	Craig Jenner Racing	10	(Australia) Craig Jenner	1
Isuzu	D-Max	Holly Espray Racing	777	(Australia) Holly Espray	2
Mazda	BT-50	Sieders Racing Team	3	(Australia) David Sieders	1–2
Mazda	BT-50	Peters Motorsport	75	(Australia) Richard Mork	1–2
Mazda	BT-50	Triple Three Racing	333	(Australia) Robert McMahon	1
Mazda	BT-50	Roo Systems Australia	707	(Australia) Lachlan Gardner	2
Mitsubishi	Triton	Sieders Racing Team	15	(Australia) Adam Marjoram	1–2
Mitsubishi	Triton	Coldmaster Australia / Industrial Batteries	33	(Australia) Harrison Gray	2
Mitsubishi	Triton	Hunter Pacific Ceiling Fans	50	(Australia) Jimmy Vernon	1–2
Mitsubishi	Triton	Best Leisure Industries	76	(Australia) Ellexandra Best	1
Mitsubishi	Triton	World's Best Technology	96	(Australia) Jaiden Maggs	1–2
Toyota	Hilux	Western Sydney Motorsport	8	(Australia) Benjamin Walsh	1–2
Toyota	Hilux	Western Sydney Motorsport	18	(Australia) Cody Brewcynski	3-6
Toyota	Hilux	Western Sydney Motorsport	64	(Australia) Craig Woods	1–2
Toyota	Hilux	Western Sydney Motorsport	99	(Australia) John Steffensen	1–2
Toyota	Hilux	JKD Racing	52	(Australia) Dean Brooking	1–2
Toyota	Hilux	JKD Racing	65	(Australia) Glen Melling	1
Toyota	Hilux	JKD Racing	99	(Australia) John Steffensen	6
Toyota	Hilux	JKD Racing	115	(United Kingdom) Tom Oliphant	5
Toyota	Hilux	JKD Racing	805	(Australia) Jensen Engelhardt	2
Toyota	Hilux	EFS 4x4 Accessories	58	(Australia) Ryal Harris	1–3

== Results and standings ==
=== Summary ===
Round		Event	Pole position	Fastest lap	Winning driver	Winning team	Winning ute	Source
1	R1	(Western Australia) Perth	(Australia) Aaron Borg	(Australia) David Sieders	(Australia) Aaron Borg	Sieders Racing Team	Isuzu D-Max	
1	R2	(Western Australia) Perth		(Australia) David Sieders	(Australia) Aaron Borg	Sieders Racing Team	Isuzu D-Max	
1	R3	(Western Australia) Perth		(Australia) George Gutierrez	(Australia) Aaron Borg	Sieders Racing Team	Isuzu D-Max	
1	R4	(Western Australia) Perth		(Australia) David Sieders	(Australia) Aaron Borg	Sieders Racing Team	Isuzu D-Max	
2	R1	(New South Wales) Eastern Creek	(Australia) Aaron Borg	(Australia) David Sieders	(Australia) David Sieders	Sieders Racing Team	Mazda BT-50	
2	R2	(New South Wales) Eastern Creek		(Australia) David Sieders	(Australia) Ryal Harris	EFS 4x4 Accessories	Toyota Hilux	
2	R3	(New South Wales) Eastern Creek		(Australia) Aaron Borg	(Australia) David Sieders	Sieders Racing Team	Mazda BT-50	
2	R4	(New South Wales) Eastern Creek		(Australia) Aaron Borg	(Australia) Aaron Borg	Sieders Racing Team	Isuzu D-Max	
3	R1	(South Australia) Tailem Bend		(Australia) Adam Marjoram	(Australia) Ryal Harris			
3	R2	(South Australia) Tailem Bend						
3	R3	(South Australia) Tailem Bend						
3	R4	(South Australia) Tailem Bend						
4	R1	(Victoria (state)) Sandown						
4	R2	(Victoria (state)) Sandown						
4	R3	(Victoria (state)) Sandown						
4	R4	(Victoria (state)) Sandown						
5	R1	(New South Wales) Bathurst						
5	R2	(New South Wales) Bathurst						
5	R3	(New South Wales) Bathurst						
5	R4	(New South Wales) Bathurst						
6	R1	(Queensland) Gold Coast						
6	R2	(Queensland) Gold Coast						
6	R3	(Queensland) Gold Coast						
6	R4	(Queensland) Gold Coast						

=== Points system ===
Position	1st	2nd	3rd	4th	5th	6th	7th	8th	9th	10th	11th	12th	13th	14th	15th	16th	17th	18th	19th
Qualifying	5																		
Races 1, 3 and 4	70	66	62	58	56	54	52	50	48	46	44	42	40	38	36	34	32	30	28
Race 2	35	33	31	29	28	27	26	25	24	23	22	21	20	19	18	17	16	15	14

=== Series standings ===
The series was won by Aaron Borg.

Standings as at the completion of the second round were as follows:

Pos.	Driver	BAR (Western Australia)				SMP (New South Wales)				BEN (South Australia)				SAN (Victoria (state))				BAT (New South Wales)				Pen.	Points
1	(Australia) Aaron Borg	1	1	1	1	2	2	2	1	WD				1	2	1	3	1	2	2	1		974
2	(Australia) Adam Marjoram	2	16	4	3	4	6	7	5	10	4	5	C	2	4	2	1	5	3	3	3		967
3	(Australia) Craig Woods	5	4	7	9	8	4	5	4	6	11	6	C	8	6	5	8	4	5	Ret	14		811
4	(Australia) Ryal Harris	4	5	2	Ret	3	1	3	2	3	2	3	C	3	2	18	6	3	2	1	1		948
5	(Australia) David Sieders	Ret	3	11	2	1	3	1	3	1	3	2	C	4	Ret	9	2	2	6	6	12		907
6	(Australia) David Casey	8	8	8	7	5	8	6	6	8	9	14	C	10	7	7	10	8	8	8	8		831
7	(Australia) George Gutierrez	6	2	3	4	11	7	12	16	5													353
8	(Australia) Adrian Cottrell	9	7	6	5	12	17	9	10	18													336
9	(Australia) Jimmy Vernon	7	6	5	6	7	5	Ret	11	4	6	4	C	5	3	3	4	5	4	5	4		862
10	(Australia) Benjamin Walsh	3	Ret	9	16	6	18	16	14	13													285
11	(Australia) Gerard Maggs	11	10	10	8	14	15	11	Ret	15													263
12	(Australia) Jaiden Maggs	10	9	12	Ret	17	10	10	9	9													261
13	(Australia) Ellexandra Best	14	12	15	14	15	13	17	15	14													257
14	(Australia) John Steffensen	13	11	14	12	13	Ret	15	17														250
15	(Australia) Richard Mork	16	14	16	13	16	16	DNS	DNS	19	Ret	17	C						Ret		Ret		178
16	(Australia) Harrison Gray					10	9	4	8														178
17	(Australia) Holly Espray					9	11	8	7	12													172
18	(Australia) Dean Brooking	12	Ret	Ret	Ret	18	14	19	19	17													147
19	(Australia) Glen Melling	15	13	17	10																		134
20	(Australia) Craig Jenner	17	15	18	15																		116
21	(Australia) Christopher Formosa					20	Ret	13	13														106
22	(Australia) Lachlan Gardner					Ret	12	14	12	11										Ret	Ret		101
23	(Australia) Jensen Engelhardt					19	Ret	18	18	16											Ret		88
24	(Australia) Robert McMahon	Ret	Ret	13	11																		84
25	(Australia) Cameron Crick									2	1	1	C										178
26	(Australia) Cody Brewczynski									7	7	4	C	7	5	5	4	10	13	17	11		463
