= 2012 Australian V8 Ute Racing Series =

2012 V8 Ute Racing Series

Seasons
- ← 2011 2013 →

The 2012 V8 Ute Racing Series was a motor racing series for Ford Falcon and Holden utilities (or "utes") built and conforming to V8 Utes series regulations and those holding valid licences to compete as issued by series organisers Spherix and Australian V8 Ute Racing Pty. Ltd. It was the twelfth running of a national series for V8 Utes in Australia. The series began on 1 March 2012 at the Adelaide Street Circuit and ended on 4 December at the Homebush Street Circuit after 8 rounds. It was won by Ryal Harris, driving a Ford FG Falcon XR8 Ute.

== Teams and drivers ==
The following drivers contested the 2012 V8 Utes Series.

Team	Car	No	Driver
Ice Break Racing	Holden VE SS Ute	1	Chris Pither
Ice Break Racing	Holden VE SS Ute	42	Jesse Dixon
Ice Break Racing	Holden VE SS Ute	42	Tom Williamson
Ice Break Racing	Holden VE SS Ute	42	Andrew Waite
SEW-Eurodrive Racing	Ford BF Falcon XR8	2	Noel Edge
Sage Racing	Holden VE SS Ute	3	Gary Baxter
Big Gun Racing	Ford BF Falcon XR8	4	Peter Burnitt
Big Gun Racing	Ford BF Falcon XR8	7	Adam Beechey
Big Gun Racing	Ford BF Falcon XR8	14	Brad Patton
Big Gun Racing	Ford FG Falcon XR8	58	Ryal Harris
Truckline Racing	Ford FG Falcon XR8	6	Ryan Hansford
Truckline Racing	Ford FG Falcon XR8	68	Kris Walton
Tinkler Motorsport	Ford FG Falcon XR8	7	Jeremy Gray
Sieders Racing Team	Ford FG Falcon XR8	8	David Sieders
Jesus Racing Team	Ford FG Falcon XR8	9	Andrew Fisher
All-Trans Truck & Spares	Ford BF Falcon XR8	10	Joshua Burdon
Samios Plumbing Supplies	Ford BF Falcon XR8	10	Glenn McNally
Hi-Tech Motorsport	Ford FG Falcon XR8	11	Jack Elsegood
Wilson Brothers Racing	Ford FG Falcon XR8	11	Benn Wilson
Workhorse Truck Collision Repairs	Ford FG Falcon XR8	11	Daniel Kennedy
Workhorse Truck Collision Repairs	Ford FG Falcon XR8	23	Ben Kavich
Go Karting Gold Coast	Ford BF Falcon XR8	14	Sam Walter
GM Motorsport	Holden VE SS Ute	20	Phonsy Mullan
Craig Dontas Racing	Holden VE SS Ute	22	Craig Dontas
Onsite Rental Group	Ford FG Falcon XR8	25	Paul Williams
Stratco Racing	Holden VE SS Ute	26	Rhys McNally
Bob Jane T-Marts	Holden VE SS Ute	27	Kim Jane
TZ Motorsport	Holden VE SS Ute	28	Todd Zani
Williams Race Tech	Holden VE SS Ute	29	Colin Bradley
Williams Race Tech	Holden VE SS Ute	43	Hayley Swanson
Williams Race Tech	Holden VE SS Ute	96	Charlie Kovacs, Jr.
iSeek Racing	Ford BF Falcon XR8	37	Grant Bromley
Wanda Paints	Holden VE SS Ute	41	Travis Sharpe
Stellar Homes	Ford BF Falcon XR8	44	Troy Dontas
Rick Gill Motorcycles	Ford BF Falcon XR8	44	Rick Gill
Giddyup Horsey Production Racing	Holden VE SS Ute	48	Tim Boyle
Macmahon Racing	Holden VE SS Ute	50	Gerard McLeod
Monster Energy	Holden VE SS Ute	56	Nathan Pretty
Walkinshaw Racing	Holden VE SS Ute	61	Cameron McConville
Western General Body Works	Holden VE SS Ute	72	Danny Buzadic
West Coast Racing	Holden VE SS Ute	92	Jake McNally
Dunn Motorsport	Ford BF Falcon XR8	99	Ben Dunn
Auto One Wildcard	Holden VE SS Ute	100	Warren Luff
Auto One Wildcard	Holden VE SS Ute	100	Greg Crick
Auto One Wildcard	Holden VE SS Ute	100	Adam Marjoram

== Race calendar ==
The 2012 V8 Utes Series was contested over eight rounds, all of which were held on the support programmes of V8 Supercars Championship events.

Rd.	Race title	Circuit	City / state	Date	Winner
1	(South Australia) Clipsal 500	Adelaide Street Circuit	Adelaide, South Australia	1–4 March	Kris Walton
2	Falken Tasmania Challenge	Symmons Plains Raceway	Launceston, Tasmania	30 Mar – 1 Apr	Nathan Pretty
3	(Western Australia) Trading Post Perth Challenge	Barbagallo Raceway	Wanneroo, Western Australia	4–6 May	Kim Jane
4	(Northern Territory) Skycity Triple Crown	Hidden Valley Raceway	Darwin, Northern Territory	15–17 June	Ryal Harris
5	(New South Wales) Supercheap Auto Bathurst 1000	Mount Panorama Circuit	Bathurst, New South Wales	4–7 October	Ryal Harris
6	(Queensland) Armor All Gold Coast 600	Surfers Paradise Street Circuit	Surfers Paradise, Queensland	19–21 October	David Sieders
7	(Victoria (state)) Winton	Winton Motor Raceway	Benalla, Victoria	16–18 Nov	Cameron McConville
8	(New South Wales) Sydney Telstra 500	Homebush Street Circuit	Sydney, New South Wales	30 Nov – 2 Dec	Cameron McConville

== Series results ==
Position	Driver	No.	Team	Points
1	Ryal Harris	58	Rexel Electrical Supplies	948
2	David Sieders	8	Sieders Racing	936
3	Nathan Pretty	56	Monster Energy	916
4	Andrew Fisher	9	Jesus Racing	866
5	Cameron McConville	61	Bundaberg Racing	817
6	Rhys McNally	26	Stratco Racing	782
7	Kris Walton	68	Rentco	781
8	Ryan Hansford	6	Truckline Racing	758
9	Craig Dontas	22	Thirsty Camel Racing	757
10	Kim Jane	27	Bob Jane T-Marts	724
11	Gary Baxter	3	Sage Automation / Roof Seal	628
12	Ben Dunn	99	Redass Mexican Food / BP Katoomba	574
13	Jake McNally	92	West Coast Racing	474
14	Ben Kavich	23	Workhorse Truck Collision Repairs	441
15	Danny Buzadzic	72	Western General Body Works	377
16	Gerard McLeod	50	Macmahon Mining & Construction	365
17	Jack Elsegood	11	Trend Micro	341
18	Warren Millett	88	Wake-Up Backpackers Racing	327
19	Phonsy Mullan	20	Ramjet Cold Air Inducition/ Ripshift/ GM Motorsport	303
20	Sean Carter	82	Williams Race Tech	299
21	Jeremy Gray	7	Teng Tools/ JMG Maintenance	270
22	Peter Burnitt	4	Rexel Electrical Supplies	231
23	Noel Edge	2	SEW – Eurodrive Racing	191
24	Jesse Dixon	1	Ice Break Racing	189
25	Hayley Swanson	43	Williams Race Tech	179
26	Travis Sharpe	41	Wanda Paints	175
27	Chris Pither	1	Ice Break Racing	174
28	Grant Johnson	47	Hi Tech Motorsport	171
29	Todd Zani	28	Ezeatm Racing Team	166
30	Benn Wilson	51	Southcott Hydraulics / Gates	165
31	Jason Gomersall	77	iseek Racing	163
32	Tom Williamson	1	Ice Break Racing	161
33	Rick Gill	51	Rick Gill Motorcycles	141
34	Andrew Waite	1	Ice Break Racing	127
35	Jason Bargwanna	100	Auto One Wildcard	120
36	George Miedecke	100	Auto One Wildcard	114
37	Gary MacDonald	10	Interior Logistics	109
38	Daniel Kennedy	11	Workhorse Truck Collision Repairs	107
39	Joshua Burdon	10	All -Trans Truck & Spares	103
40	Adam Beechey	7	Big Gun Racing	101
41	Warren Luff	100	Auto One Wildcard	100
42	Yanis Derums	10	Mango Media	93
43	Glenn McNally	10	Samios Plumbing Supplies	89
44	Wayne Wakefield	51	Big Gun Racing	78
45	Allan Letcher	21	Revolution Roofing	76
46	Cameron Wilson	4	Big Gun Racing	75
47	Tony Longhurst	100	Auto One Wildcard	72
48	Tim Blanchard	100	Auto One Wildcard	71
49	Charlie O’Brien	10	Sieders Racing	67
50	Greg Crick	100	Auto One Wildcard	66
51	Steve Charman	77	Pizza Hut Racing	61
52	Jack Le Brocq	1	Ice Break Racing	59
53	Matt Chahda	29	PGC Security / MRP Smash Repairs	57
54	Chris Atkinson	100	Auto One Wildcard	57
55	Paul Williams	25	Onsite Rental Company	55
56	Brad Patton	14	Mammoth / WIcked Energy/ Teng Tools	54
57	Sam Walter	14	Go Karting Gold Coast	54
58	Rohan Barry	10	Sieders Racing	46
59	Grant Bromley	37	iseek Racing	41
60	Adam Marjoram	100	Auto One Wildcard	31
61	Colin Bradley	29	Williams Race Tech	31
62	Michael Hector	29	Williams Race Tech	31
63	Josh Hunt	14	V8 Nights Racing	26
64	Amber Anderson	14	V8 Nights Racing	26
65	Layton Barker	29	Williams Race Tech	21
66	Troy Dontas	44	Stellar Homes	18
67	Charlie Kovacs Junior	96	Action Line Marking / City Holden	12
