= Adam Marjoram =

Australian racing driver

- Nationality: Australian
- Born: 31 May 1993 (age 33) Perth, Western Australia
- Current team: Sieders Racing Team

SuperUtes Series
- Starts: 121
- Wins: 13
- Podiums: 42
- Poles: 3
- Best finish: 1st in 2024

Previous series
- 2016-2019: Super2 Series

Adam Luke Marjoram (born 31 May 1993 in Perth) is a racing driver from Australia. He is well known for competing in the Super2 Series for Image Racing and Matt Stone Racing. He also was one of the founding members of the Erebus Academy in 2014. In 2018, he drove in the Supercars additional driver session at the Winton round for Tim Blanchard Racing.

In 2019, Marjoram retired from Motorsport. However sensationally made a return to motorsport in the V8 SuperUte Series, replacing Craig Dontas in a one-off appearance at The Bend Motorsport Park, taking pole position a race win and the round win on debut.

Marjoram made his return to full-time competition with Team Motion Racing, finishing 2023 as the runner up and 2024 as the Champion.

== Career results ==
=== Karting career summary ===
Season	Series	Position
2006	Western Australian State Karting Titles - Junior National Light	1st
2008	Western Australian State Karting Titles - Junior National Light	1st
2009	Western Australian State Karting Titles - Junior National Heavy	1st
2010	Australian National Kart Championship - Clubman Light	23rd

=== Circuit racing career ===
Season	Series	Position	Car	Team
2011	West Australian Sporting Car Club - Sports Marque Cars	1st	Porsche GT3 997	Ktec Motorsport
2012	Australian GT3 Challenge	6th	Porsche 997 GT3 Cup	Auto One Racing
2012	Australian V8 Ute Racing Series	60th	Holden Commodore VE Ute	Auto One Racing
2013	Australian V8 Ute Racing Series	16th	Holden Commodore VE Ute	Auto One Racing
2014	Australian V8 Ute Racing Series	12th	Holden Commodore VE Ute	Erebus Motorsport
2015	Australian V8 Ute Racing Series	4th	Holden Commodore VE Ute	Erebus Motorsport
2016	Supercars Dunlop Series	13th	Ford FG Falcon	Matt Stone Racing
2017	Dunlop Super2 Series	18th	Holden VF Commodore	Matt Stone Racing
2018	Dunlop Super2 Series	16th	Holden VF Commodore	Image Racing
2019	Dunlop Super2 Series	13th	Holden VF Commodore	Image Racing
2022	V8 SuperUte Series	18th	Mitsubishi Triton	Ryco Racing
2023	V8 SuperUte Series	2nd	Mitsubishi Triton	Team Motion Racing
2024	V8 SuperUte Series	1st	Isuzu D-Max	Team Motion Racing

=== Super2 Series results ===
(key) (Race results only)

Super2 Series results
Year	Team	Car	1	2	3	4	5	6	7	8	9	10	11	12	13	14	15	16	17	18	19	20	21	Position	Points
2016	Matt Stone Racing	Ford FG Falcon	ADE; R1; 14	ADE; R2; 11	PHI; R3; 17	PHI; R4; 18	PHI; R5; 16	BAR; R6; 16	BAR; R7; 16	BAR; R8; 16	TOW; R9; 11	TOW; R10; 10	SAN; R11; 11	SAN; R12; Ret	SAN; R13; 8	BAT; R14; 13	SYD; R15; 17	SYD; R16; Ret						13th	803
2017	Matt Stone Racing	Holden VF Commodore	ADE; R1; 18	ADE; R2; Ret	ADE; R3; DNS	SYM; R4; Ret	SYM; R5; 11	SYM; R6; 16	SYM; R7; 11	PHI; R8; Ret	PHI; R9; 19	PHI; R10; 16	PHI; R11; 14	TOW; R12; 12	TOW; R13; 6	SMP; R14; 20	SMP; R15; 20	SMP; R16; 17	SMP; R17; 11	SAN; R18; 12	SAN; R19; 21	NEW; R20; 13	NEW; R21; Ret	18th	675
2018	Image Racing	Holden VF Commodore	ADE; 19	ADE; 18	ADE; 14	SYM; 16	SYM; 15	SYM; Ret	BAR; 20	BAR; 17	BAR; 15	TOW; Ret	TOW; 11	SAN; 9	SAN; 15	BAT; 14	NEW; 17	NEW; C						20th	688
2019	Image Racing	Holden VF Commodore	ADE; 13	ADE; 14	ADE; 14	BAR; 17	BAR; 19	TOW; 9	TOW; Ret	QLD; 15	QLD; Ret	BAT; 9	SAN; 14	SAN; 10	NEW; 11	NEW; Ret								15th	755

=== Supercars Championship results ===
Supercars results
Year	Team	Car	1	2	3	4	5	6	7	8	9	10	11	12	13	14	15	16	17	18	19	20	21	22	23	24	25	26	27	28	29	30	31	32	Position	Points
2018	Tim Blanchard Racing	Holden ZB Commodore	ADE; R1	ADE; R2	MEL; R3	MEL; R4	MEL; R5	MEL; R6	SYM; R7	SYM; R8	PHI; R9	PHI; R10	BAR; R11	BAR; R12	WIN; R13; PO	WIN; R14; PO	HID; R15	HID; R16	TOW; R17	TOW; R18	QLD; R19	QLD; R20	SMP; R21	BEN; R22	BEN; R23	SAN; QR	SAN; R24	BAT; R25	SUR; R26	SUR; R27; C	PUK; R28	PUK; R29	NEW; R30	NEW; R31	NC	0

=== V8 Ute Racing Series Results ===
(key) (Race results only)

V8 Ute Racing Series results
Year	Team	Car	1	2	3	4	5	6	7	8	9	10	11	12	13	14	15	16	17	18	19	20	21	22	23	24	25	Position	Points
2012	Auto One Racing Wildcard	Holden VE Ute	ADE; R1	ADE; R2	ADE; R3	SYM; R4	SYM; R5	SYM; R6	WAN; R7; 23	WAN; R8; Ret	WAN; R9; 24	HID; R10	HID; R11	HID; R12	HID; R13	BAT; R14	BAT; R15	BAT; R16	SUR; R17	SUR; R18	SUR; R19	WIN; R20	WIN; R21	WIN; R22	HOM; R23	HOM; R24	HOM; R25	60th	31
2013	Auto One Racing	Holden VE Ute	ADE; R1; Ret	ADE; R2; 16	ADE; R3; 17	WAN; R4; 10	WAN; R5; 5	WAN; R6; 5	HID; R7; 12	HID; R8; 10	HID; R9; Ret	HID; R10; 13	TOW; R11; 11	TOW; R12; 22	TOW; R13; Ret	SAN; R14; 7	SAN; R15; 12	SAN; R16; Ret	BAT; R17; 15	BAT; R18; 13	BAT; R19; Ret	SUR; R20; 14	SUR; R21; 8	SUR; R22; C	HOM; R23; 22	HOM; R24; 20	HOM; R25; 23	16th	493
2014	Erebus Motorsport	Holden VE Ute	ADE; R1; Ret	ADE; R2; 16	ADE; R3; 17	WAN; R4; 14	WAN; R5; 4	WAN; R6; 29	HID; R7; 10	HID; R8; 11	HID; R9; 12	TOW; R10; 9	TOW; R11; 13	TOW; R12; 8	SAN; R13; 12	SAN; R14; 9	SAN; R15; 6	BAT; R16; 11	BAT; R17; 12	BAT; R18; 7	SUR; R19; 7	SUR; R20; 4	SUR; R21; 4	HOM; R22; 7	HOM; R23; Ret	HOM; R24; 13		12th	662
2015	Erebus Motorsport	Holden VE Ute	ADE; R1; 3	ADE; R2; 3	ADE; R3; 9	WAN; R4; 5	WAN; R5; 4	WAN; R6; 2	HID; R7; 5	HID; R8; 3	HID; R9; 20	TOW; R10; 4	TOW; R11; 2	TOW; R12; 2	SAN; R13; 4	SAN; R14; 6	SAN; R15; 23	BAT; R16; 9	BAT; R17; 9	BAT; R18; 8	SUR; R19; 7	SUR; R20; 12	SUR; R21; 7	HOM; R22; 11	HOM; R23; 11	HOM; R24; 9		4th	1066

=== SuperUtes Series Results ===
(key) (Race results only)

SuperUtes Series results
Year	Team	Car	1	2	3	4	5	6	7	8	9	10	11	12	13	14	15	16	17	18	19	20	21	22	23	24	Position	Points
2022	Sieders Racing Team	Mitsubishi Triton	TAS; R1	TAS; R2	TAS; R3	WAN; R4	WAN; R5	WAN; R6	WAN; R7	WIN; R8	WIN; R9	WIN; R10	WIN; R11	BEN; R12; 4	BEN; R13; 2	BEN; R14; C	BEN; R15; 2	BAT; R16	BAT; R17	BAT; R18	BAT; R19	SUR; R20	SUR; R21	SUR; R22	SUR; R23		18th	164
2023	Sieders Racing Team	Mitsubishi Triton	WAN; R1; 2	WAN; R2; 16	WAN; R3; 4	WAN; R4; 3	SMP; R5; 4	SMP; R6; 6	SMP; R7; 7	SMP; R8; 5	BEN; R9; 10	BEN; R10; 4	BEN; R11; 5	BEN; R12; C	SAN; R13; 2	SAN; R14; 4	SAN; R15; 2	SAN; R16; 1	BAT; R17; 5	BAT; R18; 3	BAT; R19; 3	BAT; R20; 3					2nd	967
2024	Sieders Racing Team	Isuzu D-Max	BAT; R1; 1	BAT; R2; 2	BAT; R3; 1	BAT; R4; 2	HID; R5; 1	HID; R6; 5	HID; R7; 3	HID; R8; 2	SMP; R9; 3	SMP; R10; 4	SMP; R11; 2	SMP; R12; 1	BAT; R13; 5	BAT; R14; 8	BAT; R15; Ret	BAT; R16; 8	SUR; R17; 5	SUR; R18; 1	SUR; R19; 3	SUR; R20; 3	ADE; R21; 1	ADE; R22; 1	ADE; R23; 1	ADE; R24; 1	1st	1282
2025	Sieders Racing Team	Isuzu D-Max	SMP; R1; 2	SMP; R2; 6	SMP; R3; 3	SMP; R4; 1	SYM; R5; 6	SYM; R6; 1	SYM; R7; 2	SYM; R8; 3	BAR; R9; 1	BAR; R10; 8	BAR; R11; 2	BAR; R12; 2	TOW; R13; 1	TOW; R14	TOW; R15	TOW; R16	BAT; R17	BAT; R18	BAT; R19	BAT; R20	SAN; R21	SAN; R22	SAN; R23	SAN; R24		
