= 2016 Supercars Dunlop Series =

Motor racing competition

The 2016 Supercars Dunlop Series was an Australian motor racing competition for Supercars, staged as a support series to the Virgin Australia Supercars Championship. It was the seventeenth annual Supercars Development Series and the fifth to be contested under the "Dunlop Series" name. The season was also the first in which Holden VF Commodores and Ford FG X Falcons built to 'Car of the Future' specifications are eligible for the series, racing alongside previous generation VE Commodore and FG Falcon models.

The series was won by Garry Jacobson driving for Prodrive Racing Australia in a Ford FG X Falcon.

== Teams and drivers ==
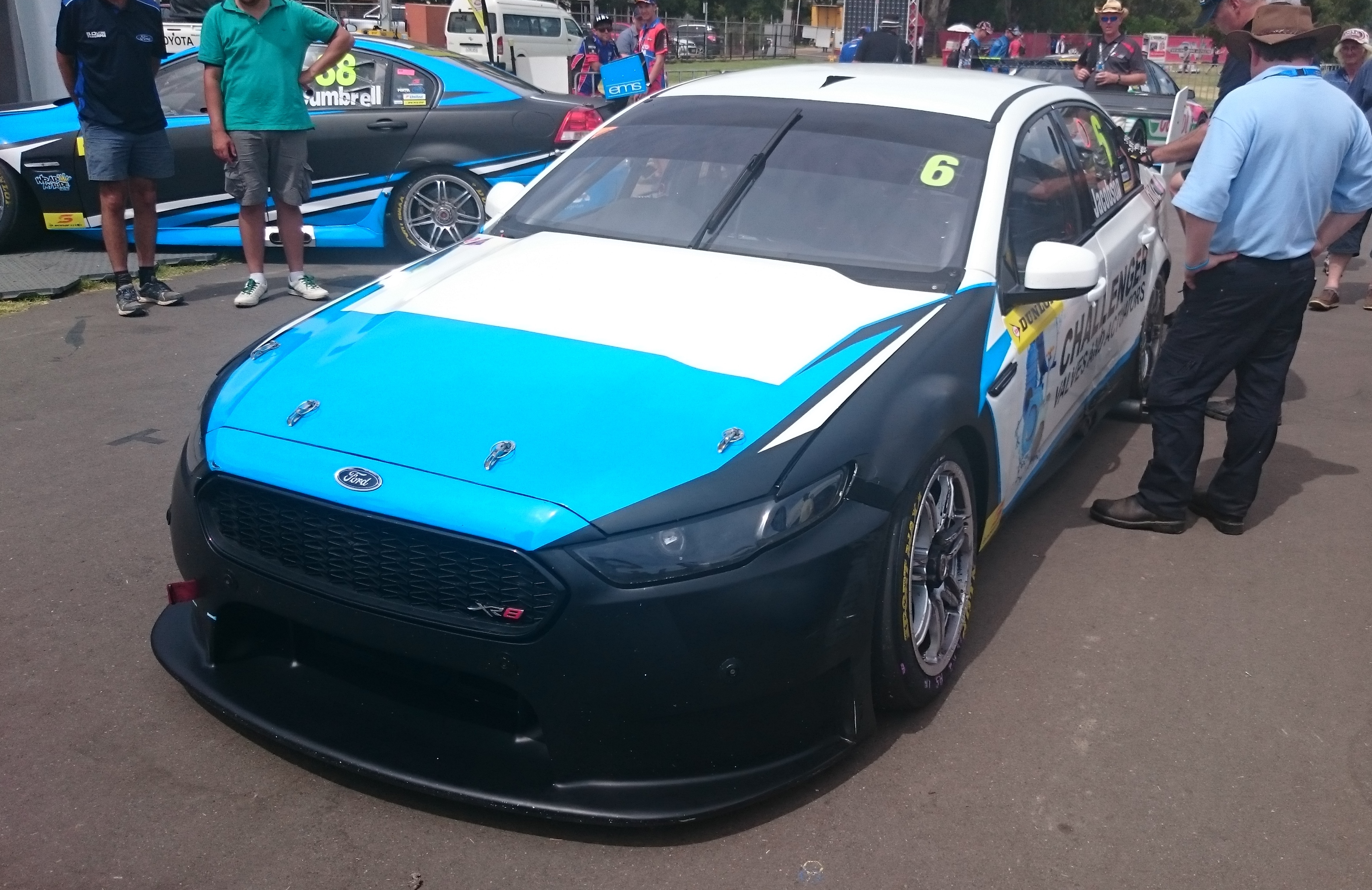
Garry Jacobson won the series for Prodrive Racing Australia in a Ford FG X Falcon.

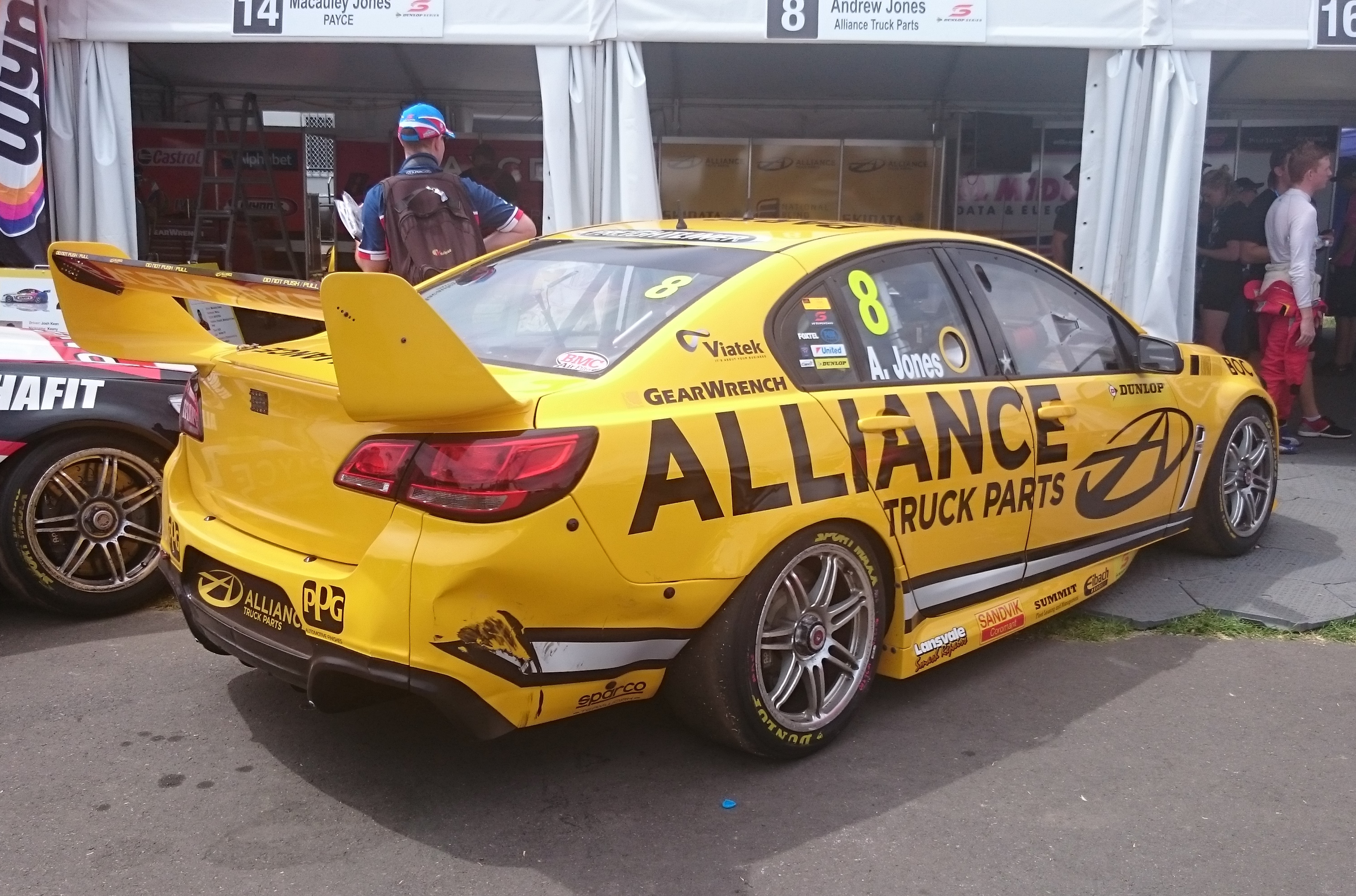
Andrew Jones placed sixth for Brad Jones Racing in a Holden VF Commodore.

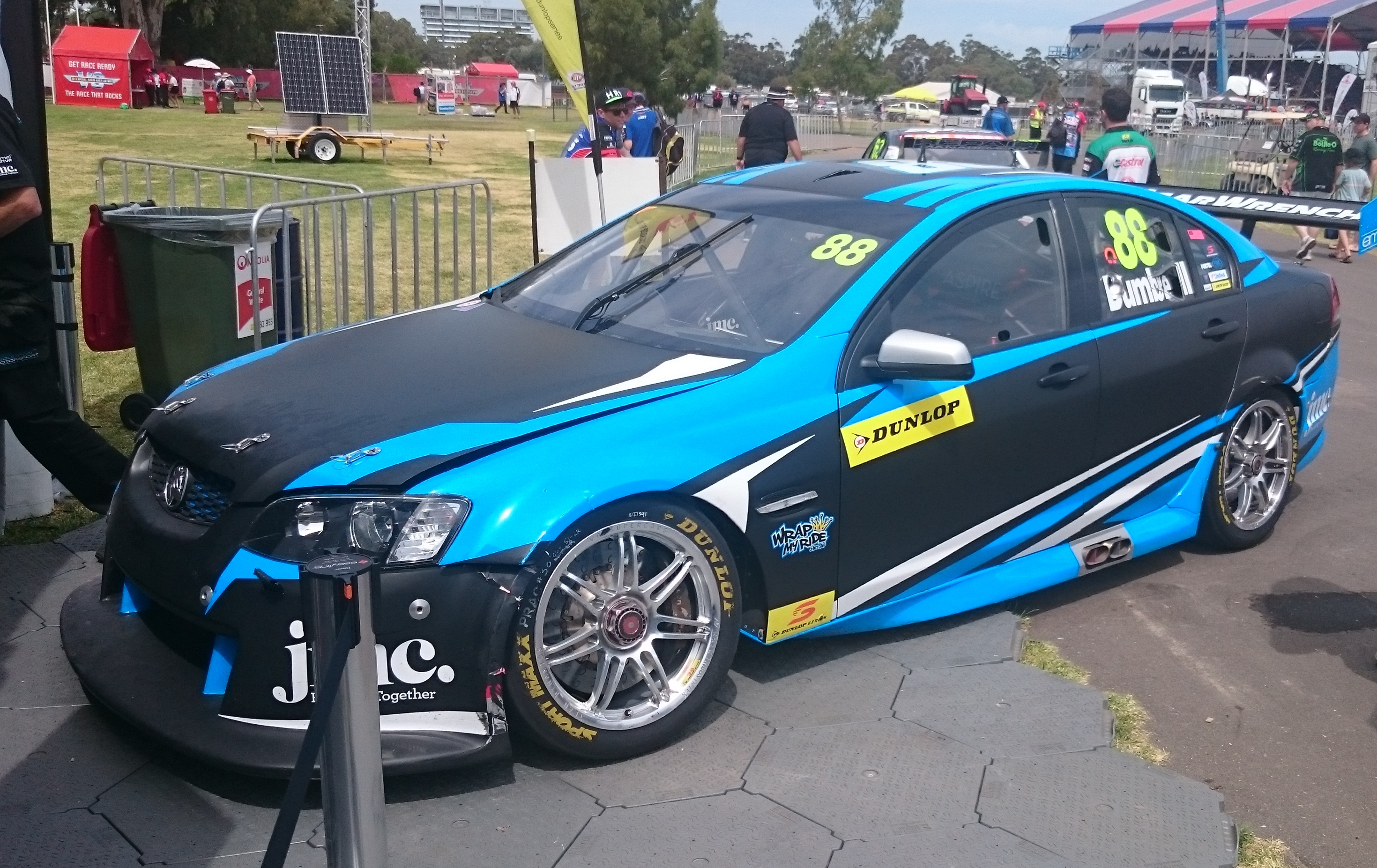
Paul Dumbrell placed seventh for Eggleston Motorsport in a Holden VE Commodore.

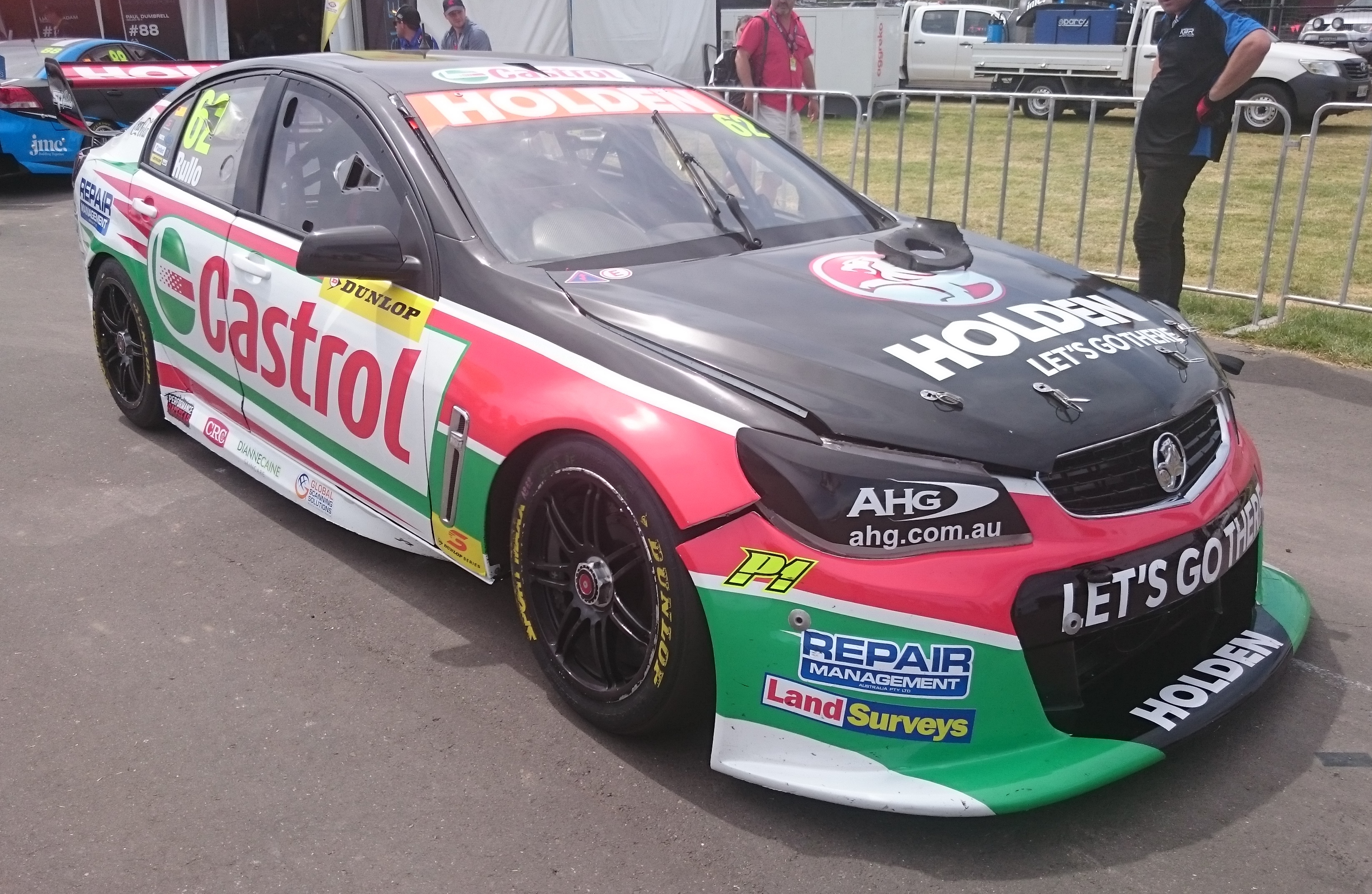
Alex Rullo placed 17th for Lucas Dumbrell Motorsport in a Holden VF Commodore.

The following teams and drivers competed in the series.

Manufacturer	Model	Team	No.	Driver	Rounds	Co-Driver	Rounds
Ford	Falcon FG X	Prodrive Racing Australia	5	(Australia) Jack Le Brocq	All		
Ford	Falcon FG X	Prodrive Racing Australia	6	(Australia) Garry Jacobson	All		
Ford	Falcon FG	Image Racing	2	(Australia) Dan Day	1–3		
Ford	Falcon FG	Image Racing	10	(Australia) Steve Owen	1		
Ford	Falcon FG	Image Racing	10	(Australia) Dean Fiore	2		
Ford	Falcon FG	Image Racing	10	(Australia) Garry Hill	3		
Ford	Falcon FG	Image Racing	58	(Australia) Ryal Harris	6		
Ford	Falcon FG	Image Racing	98	(Australia) Renee Gracie	7		
Ford	Falcon FG	Matt Stone Racing	15	(Australia) Adam Marjoram	All		
Ford	Falcon FG	MW Motorsport	16	(Australia) Bryce Fullwood	All		
Ford	Falcon FG	MW Motorsport	26	(Australia) Shae Davies	1–6		
Ford	Falcon FG	MW Motorsport	28	(Australia) Jesse Dixon	1		
Ford	Falcon FG	MW Motorsport	28	(Australia) Chelsea Angelo	5–7		
Ford	Falcon FG	Matt Chahda Motorsport	18	(Australia) Matt Chahda	All		
Ford	Falcon FG	STR Motorsport	48	(Australia) Matt Palmer	All	(Australia) Drew Russell	6
Ford	Falcon FG	Paul Morris Motorsport	67	(Australia) Anton de Pasquale	All		
Ford	Falcon FG	Paul Morris Motorsport	98	(Australia) Renee Gracie	1–5, 7		
Ford	Falcon FG	Paul Morris Motorsport	98	(Australia) Jack Smith	6		
Ford	Falcon FG	Action Racing	71	(Australia) Marcus Zukanovic	2, 5		
Holden	Commodore VF	Brad Jones Racing	8	(Australia) Andrew Jones	All		
Holden	Commodore VF	Brad Jones Racing	14	(Australia) Macauley Jones	All		
Holden	Commodore VF	Brad Jones Racing	21	(Australia) Josh Kean	All		
Holden	Commodore VF	Matt Stone Racing	35	(Australia) Todd Hazelwood	All		
Holden	Commodore VF	Dragon Motor Racing; Garry Rogers Motorsport	44	(Australia) Richard Muscat	All		
Holden	Commodore VF	Dragon Motor Racing; Garry Rogers Motorsport	99	(Australia) James Golding	All		
Holden	Commodore VF	Kostecki Brothers Racing	55	(Australia) Kurt Kostecki	1–3, 5–7		
Holden	Commodore VF	Kostecki Brothers Racing	56	(Australia) Jake Kostecki	All		
Holden	Commodore VF	Lucas Dumbrell Motorsport	62	(Australia) Alex Rullo	All		
Holden	Commodore VE	Dragon Motor Racing; Garry Rogers Motorsport	34	(Australia) Chelsea Angelo	1–3		
Holden	Commodore VE	Eggleston Motorsport	38	(Australia) Liam McAdam	1–3, 5		
Holden	Commodore VE	Eggleston Motorsport	38	(Australia) Taz Douglas	4, 7		
Holden	Commodore VE	Eggleston Motorsport	54	(Australia) Taz Douglas	2–3, 5–6	(Australia) Grant Denyer	6
Holden	Commodore VE	Eggleston Motorsport	88	(Australia) Paul Dumbrell	1–6		
Holden	Commodore VE	THR Developments	45	(Australia) Taz Douglas	1		
Holden	Commodore VE	Warrin Mining	64	(Australia) Adam Wallis	1		

== Calendar ==
The 2016 calendar was released on 29 October 2015.

Rnd.	Race	Event name	Circuit	Location	Date	Race winner	Round winner
1	1	(South Australia) Clipsal 500 Adelaide	Adelaide Street Circuit	Adelaide, South Australia	4 March	Paul Dumbrell	Garry Jacobson
1	2	(South Australia) Clipsal 500 Adelaide	Adelaide Street Circuit	Adelaide, South Australia	5 March	Garry Jacobson	Garry Jacobson
2	1	(Victoria (state)) WD-40 Phillip Island SuperSprint	Phillip Island Grand Prix Circuit	Phillip Island, Victoria	16 April	Garry Jacobson	Garry Jacobson
2	2	(Victoria (state)) WD-40 Phillip Island SuperSprint	Phillip Island Grand Prix Circuit	Phillip Island, Victoria	17 April	James Golding	Garry Jacobson
2	3	(Victoria (state)) WD-40 Phillip Island SuperSprint	Phillip Island Grand Prix Circuit	Phillip Island, Victoria	17 April	Garry Jacobson	Garry Jacobson
3	1	(Western Australia) Perth SuperSprint	Barbagallo Raceway	Perth, Western Australia	7 May	Jack Le Brocq	Jack Le Brocq
3	2	(Western Australia) Perth SuperSprint	Barbagallo Raceway	Perth, Western Australia	8 May	Jack Le Brocq	Jack Le Brocq
3	3	(Western Australia) Perth SuperSprint	Barbagallo Raceway	Perth, Western Australia	8 May	Jack Le Brocq	Jack Le Brocq
4	1	(Queensland) Castrol Edge Townsville 400	Townsville Street Circuit	Townsville, Queensland	9 July	Jack Le Brocq	Jack Le Brocq
4	2	(Queensland) Castrol Edge Townsville 400	Townsville Street Circuit	Townsville, Queensland	10 July	Jack Le Brocq	Jack Le Brocq
5	1	(Victoria (state)) Wilson Security Sandown 500	Sandown Raceway	Melbourne, Victoria	17 September	Garry Jacobson	Garry Jacobson
5	2	(Victoria (state)) Wilson Security Sandown 500	Sandown Raceway	Melbourne, Victoria	17 September	Paul Dumbrell	Garry Jacobson
5	3	(Victoria (state)) Wilson Security Sandown 500	Sandown Raceway	Melbourne, Victoria	18 September	James Golding	Garry Jacobson
6	1	(New South Wales) Supercheap Auto Bathurst 1000	Mount Panorama Circuit	Bathurst, New South Wales	6–9 October	Paul Dumbrell	Paul Dumbrell
7	1	(New South Wales) Coates Hire Sydney 500	Homebush Street Circuit	Sydney, New South Wales	3 December	Jack Le Brocq	Jack Le Brocq
7	2	(New South Wales) Coates Hire Sydney 500	Homebush Street Circuit	Sydney, New South Wales	4 December	Jack Le Brocq	Jack Le Brocq

Note: "Event name" refers to the 2016 Virgin Australia Supercars Championship event at which the round was contested.

== Series standings ==
=== Points system ===
Points were awarded in each race as follows.

Round format	Position																													
Round format	1st	2nd	3rd	4th	5th	6th	7th	8th	9th	10th	11th	12th	13th	14th	15th	16th	17th	18th	19th	20th	21st	22nd	23rd	24th	25th	26th	27th	28th	29th	30th
Three races	100	92	86	80	74	68	64	60	56	52	48	46	44	42	40	38	36	34	32	30	28	26	24	22	20	18	16	14	12	10
Two races	150	138	129	120	111	102	96	90	84	78	72	69	66	63	60	57	54	51	48	45	42	39	36	33	30	27	24	21	18	15
One race	300	276	258	240	222	204	192	180	168	156	144	138	132	126	120	114	108	102	96	90	84	78	72	66	60	54	48	42	36	30

=== Points standings ===
The series was won by Garry Jacobson driving for Prodrive Racing Australia in a Ford FG X Falcon.

Pos.	Driver	No.	ADE (South Australia)		PHI (Victoria (state))			BAR (Western Australia)			TOW (Queensland)		SAN (Victoria (state))			BAT (New South Wales)	SYD (New South Wales)		Pen.	Pts.	
1	(Australia) Garry Jacobson	6	3	**1**	1	**2**	1	3	24	12	2	5	**1**	**2**	5	**2**	5	**5**	0	1738	
2	(Australia) Jack Le Brocq	5	4	3	**10**	4	13	1	**1**	**1**	**1**	**1**	9	Ret	2	7	**1**	1	15	1650	
3	(Australia) Todd Hazelwood	35	**22**	4	4	15	7	8	5	3	3	3	7	Ret	4	6	4	3	0	1418	
4	(Australia) James Golding	99	13	2	2	1	**2**	10	2	4	9	4	13	6	1	Ret	2	2	0	1404	
5	(Australia) Taz Douglas	45/54	10	7	9	10	5	11	9	2	6	6	5	3	Ret	10	6	4	0	1294	
6	(Australia) Andrew Jones	8	2	19	5	3	3	**2**	17	6	7	15	10	Ret	12	8	8	6	0	1254	
7	(Australia) Paul Dumbrell	88	1	Ret	3	5	23	4	3	8	Ret	2	3	1	**19**	1			0	1216	
8	(Australia) Richard Muscat	44	5	Ret	6	25	18	13	12	9	5	DSQ	2	7	7	4	10	7	0	1124	
9	(Australia) Macauley Jones	14	21	5	15	12	9	7	10	5	4	7	14	8	9	9	9	Ret	0	1111	
10	(Australia) Shae Davies	26	7	6	24	9	6	5	7	10	16	11	4	5	3	5			25	1100	
11	(Australia) Anton de Pasquale	67	8	12	13	14	10	6	18	14	Ret	9	Ret	9	14	3	7	8	25	1042	
12	(Australia) Josh Kean	21	Ret	Ret	8	6	4	9	8	11	8	8	12	15	13	15	12	10	25	924	
13	(Australia) Adam Marjoram	15	14	11	17	18	16	16	16	15	11	10	11	Ret	8	13	17	Ret	0	803	
14	(Australia) Bryce Fullwood	16	DNS	DNS	11	7	12	14	11	7	10	18	8	Ret	DNS	12	3	9	50	802	
15	(Australia) Matt Palmer	48	17	16	21	22	21	22	21	18	15	17	17	14	16	11	15	14	0	778	
16	(Australia) Kurt Kostecki	55	18	20	12	8	8	12	4	13			6	4	10	14	Ret	Ret	25	733	
17	(Australia) Alex Rullo	62	19	Ret	18	16	20	15	6	19	Ret	12	Ret	16	6	16	14	13	25	686	
18	(Australia) Jake Kostecki	56	Ret	18	20	19	24	18	15	21	12	13	Ret	13	11	19	18	11	0	683	
19	(Australia) Renee Gracie	98	12	Ret	22	21	19	21	19	17	14	16	15	12	17		13	15	25	594	
20	(Australia) Matt Chahda	18	15	15	16	20	17	23	13	Ret	13	14	DSQ	DSQ	DNS	18	11	Ret	10	585	
21	(Australia) Chelsea Angelo	34/28	20	13	19	23	14	17	20	16			Ret	10	20	20	16	13	25	583	
22	(Australia) Liam McAdam	38	11	10	7	13	15	20	14	Ret			19	Ret	15	DNS			0	442	
23	(Australia) Dan Day	2	23	14	23	24	11	19	23	Ret									0	249	
24	(Australia) Marcus Zukanovic	71			25	17	22						18	11	18				0	198	
25	(Australia) Steve Owen	10	6	8															0	192	
26	(Australia) Jesse Dixon	28	9	9															0	168	
27	(Australia) Grant Denyer	54														10			0	156	
28	(Australia) Drew Russell	48														11			0	144	
29	(Australia) Adam Wallis	64	16	17															0	111	
30	(Australia) Dean Fiore	10			14	11	25												0	110	
31	(Australia) Ryal Harris	58														17			0	108	
32	(Australia) Garry Hill	10						24	22	20									0	78	
—	(Australia) Jack Smith	98														Ret			0	0	
Pos.	Driver	No.	Car	ADE (South Australia)		PHI (Victoria (state))			BAR (Western Australia)			TOW (Queensland)		SAN (Victoria (state))			BAT (New South Wales)	SYD (New South Wales)		Pen.	Pts.

Colour	Result
Gold	Winner
Silver	Second place
Bronze	Third place
Green	Points classification
Blue	Non-points classification
Blue	Non-classified finish (NC)
Purple	Retired, not classified (Ret)
Red	Did not qualify (DNQ)
Red	Did not pre-qualify (DNPQ)
Black	Disqualified (DSQ)
White	Did not start (DNS)
White	Withdrew (WD)
White	Race cancelled (C)
Blank	Did not practice (DNP)
Blank	Did not arrive (DNA)
Blank	Excluded (EX)

Bold - Pole position
Italics - Fastest lap

== See also ==
- 2016 V8 Supercar season
