= 2013 Australian V8 Ute Racing Series =

2013 V8 Ute Racing Series

Seasons
- ← 2012 2014 →

The 2013 Australian V8 Ute Racing Series was an Australian motor racing competition for modified V8 engined production utilities. It was sanctioned by the Confederation of Australian Motor Sport (CAMS) as a National Series with Australian V8 Ute Racing Pty Ltd appointed as the Category Manager. Promoted as the 2013 Auto One V8 Ute Racing Series protected by Armor All, it was the 13th annual Australian V8 Ute Racing Series.

The series was won by Ryal Harris driving a Ford FG Falcon Ute.

== Calendar ==
The series was contested over eight rounds.

Round	Circuit	Date	Format
1	Adelaide Parklands Circuit	28 February - 3 March	Three races
2	Barbagallo Raceway	3 – 5 May	Three races
3	Hidden Valley Raceway	14 – 16 June	Four races
4	Townsville Street Circuit	5 – 7 July	Three races
5	Sandown International Motor Raceway	13 – 15 September	Three races
6	Mount Panorama Circuit	10–13 October	Three races
7	Surfers Paradise Street Circuit	25–27 October	Three races
8	Sydney Olympic Park Street Circuit	6 – 8 December	Three races

== Points system ==
Series points were awarded on the following basis for each qualifying session and each race in the series.

Position	1st	2nd	3rd	4th	5th	6th	7th	8th	9th	10th	11th	12th	13th	14th	15th	16th	17th	18th	19th	20th	21st	22nd	23rd	24th	25th	26th	27th	28th	29th	30th	31st	32nd
Points	35	33	31	29	28	27	26	25	24	23	22	21	20	19	18	17	16	15	14	13	12	11	10	9	8	7	6	5	4	3	2	1

The results for each round were determined by the number of points scored by each driver at that round.

The driver gaining the highest points total over all rounds was declared the winner of the Series.

== Series standings ==
Position	Driver	No.	Car	Team	Points
1	Ryal Harris	1	Ford FG Falcon Ute	Tapout Energy Racing	893
2	Nathan Pretty	56	Holden VE Ute	Milwaukee Racing	862
3	David Sieders	8	Ford FG Falcon Ute	Mine Site Fencing Australia	836
4	Rhys McNally	26	Holden VE Ute	Stratco Racing	816
5	Kris Walton	68	Ford FG Falcon Ute	Rentco Transport Equipment Rentals	815
6	Gary Baxter	3	Holden VE Ute	Sage Automation / Roof Seal	768
7	Kim Jane	27	Holden VE Ute	Bob Jane T-Marts	739
8	Ryan Hansford	6	Ford FG Falcon Ute	Hawkins Transport - HT Racing	730
9	Craig Dontas	22	Holden VE Ute	Thirsty Camel Racing	719
10	Andrew Fisher	9	Ford FG Falcon Ute	Jesus Racing Team	686
11	Elliot Barbour	7	Ford FG Falcon Ute	Sieders Racing Team / Guide Dogs Victoria	656
12	Stephen White	19	Holden VE Ute	Dunlop Super Dealer	581
13	Wayne Wakefield	13	Ford FG Falcon Ute	Bacardi Oakheart	513
14	Jesse Dixon	88	Holden VE Ute	Hayman Reese Racing	506
15	Gerard McLeod	50	Holden VE Ute	Macmahon Mining	496
16	Adam Marjoram	5	Holden VE Ute	Auto One Racing	493
17	Jeremy Gray	67	Ford FG Falcon Ute	JMG Racing	457
18	Tony Longhurst	25	Holden VE Ute	The Boat Works	375
19	Cam Wilson	24	Ford FG Falcon Ute	Go Karting Gold Coast	372
20	Phonsy Mullan	20	Holden VE Ute	Hi-Tech Oils / Ramjet Cold Air Inducition / Ripshift / GM Motorsport	343
21	Ben Dunn	99	Ford FG Falcon Ute	RedAss Mexican Food / BNP Securities	328
22	Todd Zani	28	Holden VE Ute	Ezetax Racing Team	287
23	Matthew Nolan	21	Holden VE Ute	CIGWELD	269
24	Peter Burnitt	4	Ford FG Falcon Ute	Forgiven Racing	234
25	Jack Elsegood	11	Ford FG Falcon Ute	Fuchs / Hustler Mowers	228
26	Fanny Buzadzic	72	Ford FG Falcon Ute	Western General Body Works	216
27	Noel Edge	2	Ford FG Falcon Ute	Australian Conveyor Racing	210
28	Gary MacDonald	10	Ford FG Falcon Ute	Interior Logistics	193
29	John Wood	41	Holden VE Ute	Battery World / VISA Logistics / Race Fuels	154
30	Chris Pither	25	Holden VE Ute	Insane Racing	144
31	Glenn McNally	10	Ford FG Falcon Ute	JSW Australia	143
32	Mike Almond	25	Holden VE Ute	Williams Race Tech	135
33	Benn Wilson	11	Ford FG Falcon Ute	P.I. Technical Services	130
34	Richard Bloomfield	57	Holden VE Ute	Octane Events	107
35	Ben Dowley	43	Holden VE Ute	Williams Race Tech	107
36	Peter Major	41	Holden VE Ute	Williams Race Tech	88
37	Charlie O'Brien	10	Ford FG Falcon Ute	Sieders Racing	86
38	Rhett Noonan	99	Ford FG Falcon Ute	Accuweigh / Jaypack Cartons	85
39	Warren Millett	18	Holden VE Ute	Wake-Up Backpackers Racing	75
40	Grant Bromley	29	Ford FG Falcon Ute	HTA / Isuzu Utes / Iseek	74
41	Graham Edwards	99	Ford FG Falcon Ute	Sieders Racing	68
42	Yanis Derums	41	Ford FG Falcon Ute	Mango credit	60
43	Dylan Thomas	11	Ford FG Falcon Ute	CXC Global Racing	54
44	George Miedecke	25	Holden VE Ute	The Boat Works	52
45	Troy Wilson	29	Ford FG Falcon Ute	HE PARTS	47
46	Rohan Barry	11	Ford FG Falcon Ute	Hutchinson Build / Shake It Up	42
47	Jack Le Brocq	18	Holden VE Ute	Wake-Up Backpackers Racing	40
48	Allan Letcher	43	Holden VE Ute	Revolution Roofing	38
49	Charlie Kovacs (Jnr)	43	Holden VE Ute	Red Express Deliveries / Air Road Freight	37
50	Stephen Wilson	20	Holden VE Ute	Wil-Tow / Hino	22
51	Troy Dontas	44	Holden VE Ute	Brecknock Insurance Brokers	19
52	Layton Barker	43	Holden VE Ute	Bartech Switchboards Racing	17
53	Denis Cribbin	41	Holden VE Ute	Williams Race Tech	4
