= Ryal Harris =

Australian racing driver

- Nationality: Australian
- Born: 26 July 1985 (age 41) Gold Coast, Queensland

V8 SuperUte Series career
- Teams: Peters Motorsport
- Starts: 64
- Wins: 81
- Poles: 0
- Fastest laps: 0
- Best finish: 1st in 2012, 2013, 2015, 2018 & 2021

Previous series
- 2013-2015: Australian V8 Ute Racing Series

Ryal Harris (born 26 July 1985 in Gold Coast) is a racing driver from Australia. who formerly competed in the Super2 Series for Matt Stone Racing in 2022. Harris currently races in the V8 SuperUte Series. He currently holds the record for most successful Superutes driver with five titles and over 80 wins.

== Career results ==
Season	Series	Position	Car	Team
2012	Australian V8 Ute Racing Series	1st	Ford Falcon FG Ute	Big Gun Racing
2013	Australian V8 Ute Racing Series	1st	Ford Falcon FG Ute	Brecknook Insurance Brokers
2014	Australian V8 Ute Racing Series	5th	Ford Falcon FG Ute	Matt Stone Racing
2015	Australian V8 Ute Racing Series	1st	Ford Falcon FG Ute	Matt Stone Racing
2016	Australian V8 Ute Racing Series	11th	Ford Falcon FG Ute	Matt Stone Racing
2017	Australian V8 Ute Racing Series	2nd	Ford Falcon FG Ute	RGS Racing
2018	2018 SuperUtes Series	1st	Mazda BT-50	Peters Motorsport
2019	2019 SuperUtes Series	3rd	Mazda BT-50	Peters Motorsport
2023	V8 SuperUte Series	3rd	Toyota Hilux	Peters Motorsport
2024	V8 SuperUte Series	10th	Mazda BT-50	EFS 4x4 Accessories

=== Super2 Series results ===
(key) (Race results only)

Super2 Series results
Year	Team	Car	1	2	3	4	5	6	7	8	9	10	11	12	13	14	15	16	17	18	19	20	21	Position	Points
2016	Image Racing	Ford FG Falcon	ADE; R1	ADE; R2	PHI; R3	PHI; R4	PHI; R5	BAR; R6	BAR; R7	BAR; R8	TOW; R9	TOW; R10	SAN; R11	SAN; R12	SAN; R13	BAT; R14; 17	SYD; R15	SYD; R16						31st	108

=== V8 Superute Series results ===
(key) (Race results only)

SuperUtes Series results
Year	Team	Car	1	2	3	4	5	6	7	8	9	10	11	12	13	14	15	16	17	18	19	20	21	22	23	24	25	Position	Points
2013	Brecknook Insurance Brokers	Ford FG Ute	ADE; R1	ADE; R2	ADE; R3	WAN; R4	WAN; R5	WAN; R6	HID; R7	HID; R8	HID; R9	HID; R10	TOW; R11	TOW; R12	TOW; R13	SAN; R14	SAN; R15	SAN; R16	BAT; R17	BAT; R18	BAT; R19	SUR; R20	SUR; R21	SUR; R22	HOM; R23	HOM; R24	HOM; R25	1st	893
2014	Matt Stone Racing	Ford FG Ute	ADE; R1	ADE; R2	ADE; R3	WAN; R4	WAN; R5	WAN; R6	HID; R7	HID; R8	HID; R9	TOW; R10	TOW; R11	TOW; R12	SAN; R13	SAN; R14	SAN; R15	BAT; R16	BAT; R17	BAT; R18	SUR; R19	SUR; R20	SUR; R21	HOM; R22	HOM; R23	HOM; R24		5th	821
2015	Matt Stone Racing	Ford FG Ute	ADE; R1	ADE; R2	ADE; R3	WAN; R4	WAN; R5	WAN; R6	HID; R7	HID; R8	HID; R9	TOW; R10	TOW; R11	TOW; R12	SAN; R13	SAN; R14	SAN; R15	BAT; R16	BAT; R17	BAT; R18	SUR; R19	SUR; R20	SUR; R21	HOM; R22	HOM; R23	HOM; R24		1st	1180
2018	Peters Motorsport	Mazda BT-50	ADE; R1; 1	ADE; R2; Ret	ADE; R3; 1	WIN; R4; 5	WIN; R5; 1	WIN; R6; 2	TOW; R7; 10	TOW; R8; 1	TOW; R9; 1	QLD; R10; 1	QLD; R11; 2	QLD; R12; 6	SAN; R13; 3	SAN; R14; 11	SAN; R15; 6	BAT; R16; 1	BAT; R17; 1	BAT; R18; 1	SUR; R19; 1	SUR; R20; 2	SUR; R21; 4	NEW; R22; 7	NEW; R23; 1	NEW; R24; 3		1st	1098
2019	Peters Motorsport	Mazda BT-50	ADE; R1	ADE; R2	ADE; R3	WAN; R4	WAN; R5	WAN; R6	WIN; R7	WIN; R8	WIN; R9	TOW; R10	TOW; R11	TOW; R12	QLD; R13	QLD; R14	QLD; R15	BAT; R16	BAT; R17	BAT; R18	SUR; R19	SUR; R20	SUR; R21	NEW; R22	NEW; R23	NEW; R24		3rd	1053
2021	Peters Motorsport	Mazda BT-50	BEN; R1; 1	BEN; R2; 1	BEN; R3; 2	SMP; R4; 3	SMP; R5; 7	SMP; R6; 4	SMP2; R7; 1	SMP2; R8; 1	SMP2; R9; 6	SMP2; R10; 7	BAT; R11; 1	BAT; R12; 1	BAT; R13; 6	BAT; R14; 4												1st	528
2022	Sieders Racing Team	Ford Ranger	TAS; R1	TAS; R2	TAS; R3	WAN; R4	WAN; R5	WAN; R6	WAN; R7	WIN; R8	WIN; R9	WIN; R10	WIN; R11	BEN; R12	BEN; R13	BEN; R14	BEN; R15	BAT; R16	BAT; R17	BAT; R18	BAT; R19	SUR; R20; 1	SUR; R21; 2	SUR; R22; 1	SUR; R23; 1			17th	233
2023	Peters Motorsport	Toyota Hilux	WAN; R1; 4	WAN; R2; 5	WAN; R3; 2	WAN; R4; Ret	SMP; R5; 3	SMP; R6; 1	SMP; R7; 3	SMP; R8; 2	BEN; R9; 3	BEN; R10; 2	BEN; R11; 3	BEN; R12; C	SAN; R13; 3	SAN; R14; 1	SAN; R15; 18	SAN; R16; 6	BAT; R17; 3	BAT; R18; 1	BAT; R19; 1	BAT; R20; 2	SUR; R21; 1	SUR; R22; Ret	SUR; R23; 1	SUR; R24; 1		3rd	948
2024	EFS 4X4 Accessories	Mazda BT-50	BAT; R1; 12	BAT; R2; Ret	BAT; R3; 5	BAT; R4; 3	HID; R5; 4	HID; R6; Ret	HID; R7; 7	HID; R8; 5	SMP; R9; 4	SMP; R10; 1	SMP; R11; 21	SMP; R12; 10	BAT; R13; Ret	BAT; R14; 9	BAT; R15; 18	BAT; R16; DNS	SUR; R17; 2	SUR; R18; 2	SUR; R19; 1	SUR; R20; 1	ADE; R21; 10	ADE; R22; Ret	ADE; R23; 11	ADE; R24; Ret		10th	874

Sporting positions
Preceded by Chris Pither	Winner of the V8 Ute Racing Series; 2012, 2013 and 2015	Succeeded by David Sieders
Preceded by Tom Alexander	Winner of the SuperUtes Series; 2018 and 2021	Succeeded by Aaron Borg
