= SuperUtes Series =

Australian pickup truck racing competition

- Category: Pickup Truck Racing
- Country: Australia
- Inaugural season: 2018
- Constructors: Ford; Holden; Isuzu; Mazda; Mitsubishi; Toyota
- Engine suppliers: Chevrolet LS3 V8
- Tyre suppliers: Yokohama
- Drivers' champion: (Australia) David Sieders
- Teams' champion: Sieders Racing Team
- Official website: Tyrepower V8 SuperUte Series

The SuperUtes Series (promoted as the V8 SuperUte Series) is an Australian pickup truck racing competition that was launched in 2018 as a successor to the V8 Ute Racing Series. The series' events are held as a support category to Supercars Championship events throughout Australia.

== Background ==
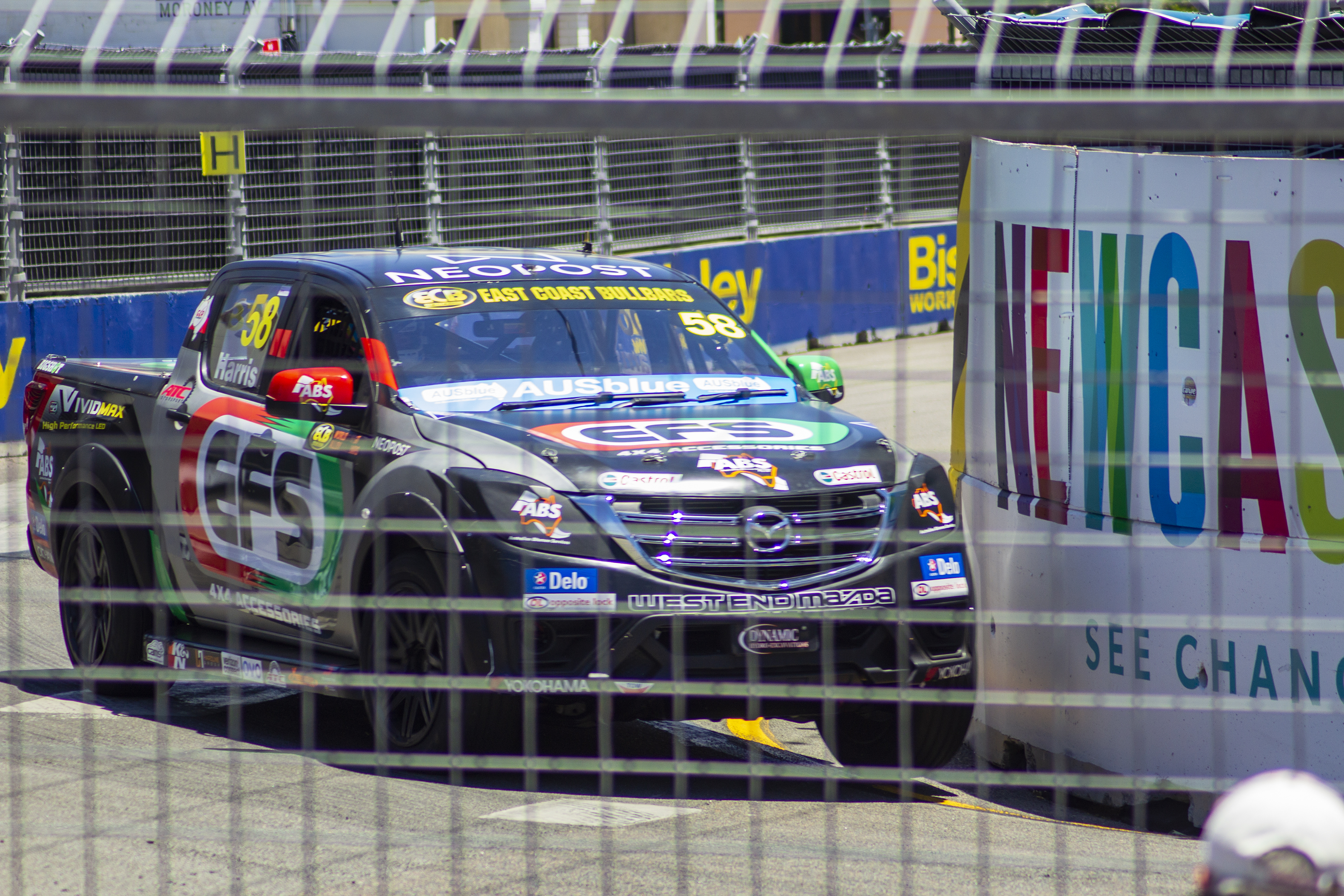
Ryal Harris (Mazda BT-50) was the inaugural SuperUtes Series winner

The V8 Ute Racing Series, which ran from 2001 to 2017, used utility vehicles based on the Ford Falcon Ute and Holden Ute models. However, with production of the two models finishing in 2016 and 2017 respectively, utility vehicles were no longer being mass produced in Australia, which led to investigations into a new platform for the Utes series as far back as the early 2010s. While an initial plan was proposed to continue with a generic utility chassis, the Supercars Championship purchased the series in 2015 and pursued a move to a production-based series which would move away from the traditional formula. After several delays, it was announced in 2016 that SuperUtes, based on production dual-cab diesel-powered utilities, would be introduced in 2018.

== History ==
The inaugural season launched at the 2018 Adelaide 500 with ten utes entered, representing five manufacturers in Ford, Holden, Mazda, Mitsubishi and Toyota. Isuzu would later join the series while Dakar Rally winner Toby Price was amongst the entries in a Mitsubishi Triton. The first race for the new category was won by Ryal Harris, a three time series winner in V8 Utes, who went on to win the series in a Mazda BT-50.

The new series drew some criticism due to the small field sizes and slower lap times than V8 Utes. The higher centre of gravity also saw some SuperUtes roll over, most notably at the Queensland Raceway round in 2018 and Adelaide Street Circuit in 2019, where two vehicles rolled during each event. This led to various technical upgrades for the cars during the 2019 season, including lowered ride heights and a move to a race-specification Yokohama tyre.

The series announced further changes for the 2020 season, with the turbo diesel engine to be replaced by a LS3 V8 Engine in an attempt to reconnect with fans of the V8 Utes era. The ownership of the series also transferred from Supercars Championship to the team owners themselves. However, the 2020 season was then cancelled and the series did not re-launch in its new guise until May 2021 at The Bend SuperSprint.

Ryal Harris won his second title in the five-round 2021 SuperUtes Series, again in a Peters Motorsport Mazda BT-50. Aaron Borg won the 2022 SuperUtes Series driving for Sieders Racing Team, who had won the V8 Utes series in 2016.

== Vehicle specification ==
2018 & 2019

- 4 or 5 cylinder turbo Diesel Engine evaluation
- Motec ECU with Supercars engine parity program
- Motec dash colour display/data logger
- Exhaust – (OE manifold)
- Suspension – Front and Rear SupaShock shock absorbers and springs
- Brakes – Brembo 6 piston front and 4 piston rear callipers, Brembo front and rear disc’s
- Tilton Pedal box and master cylinders incorporating brake bias adjustments
- Xtreme Outback 230mm twin plate ceramic clutch kit
- Control gearbox and ratios
- Control differential and ratio
- Control R-spec Yokohama tyres
- 20” control Hussla wheels
- Control specification roll cage (bespoke to each manufacturer) – CAMS approved

2021-onwards

- Engine: Warspeed Prepared Control LS3 6.2 Ltr Engine
- Control ECU: Haltech Nexus Locked, with Control Wiring Harness
- Control Dash: Motec C125 with Data Logging
- Exhaust Manifold: Standard GM
- Exhaust System: Twin 3inch with X Pipe
- Suspension: Pace Innovations Control Rear Adjustable Live Axle, Front standard control arms with front and rear Bilstein Control Coilovers
- Brakes: Brembo 6 piston front and 4 piston rear callipers, Brembo front and rear discs
- Foot Pedal Controls: Tilton Pedal box and master cylinders incorporating brake bias adjustments
- Gearbox: 6 Speed Tremec Control Gearbox and Ratios
- Tyres: Control R-spec Yokohama tyres
- Wheels: Control 18inch x 9.5inch Lenso Control Wheels

== Circuits ==
- (South Australia) Adelaide Street Circuit (2018–2019, 2024, 2026)
- (Northern Territory) Hidden Valley Raceway (2024)
- (New South Wales) Mount Panorama Circuit (2018–2019, 2021–present)
- (New South Wales) Newcastle Street Circuit (2018–2019)
- Queensland Raceway (2018–2019)
- (Queensland) Reid Park Street Circuit (2018–2019, 2025)
- (Victoria (state)) Sandown Raceway (2018, 2023, 2025)
- (Queensland) Surfers Paradise Street Circuit (2018–2019, 2022–2024, 2026)
- (New South Wales) Sydney Motorsport Park (2021, 2023–present)
- (Tasmania) Symmons Plains Raceway (2022, 2025–present)
- (South Australia) The Bend Motorsport Park (2022–2023)
- (Western Australia) Wanneroo Raceway (2019, 2022–2023, 2025–present)
- (Victoria (state)) Winton Motor Raceway (2018–2019, 2022)

== Series winners ==
Year	Winner	Car	Team
2018	(Australia) Ryal Harris	Mazda BT-50	Peters Motorsport
2019	(New Zealand) Tom Alexander	Isuzu D-Max	Ross Stone Racing
2020	Not contested		
2021	(Australia) Ryal Harris	Mazda BT-50	Peters Motorsport
2022	(Australia) Aaron Borg	Holden Colorado	Sieders Racing Team
2023	(Australia) Aaron Borg	Isuzu D-Max	Sieders Racing Team
2024	(Australia) Adam Marjoram	Isuzu D-Max	Sieders Racing Team
2025	(Australia) David Sieders	Mazda BT-50	Sieders Racing Team
