= Cameron Crick =

Australian racing driver

- Nationality: Australian
- Born: 25 October 1997 (age 29) Camden, New South Wales, Australia
- Relatives: Rodney Crick (father)

Supercars Championship
- Years active: 2024 - 2025
- Teams: Matt Stone Racing
- Starts: 10
- Wins: 0
- Poles: 0
- Fastest laps: 0

Previous series
- 2016–2021 2017 2018,19,21,23,24 2019 2020 2022-24: Toyota 86 Series Australia; V8 Ute Racing Series; SuperUtes Series; Porsche Sprint Challenge Australia; Australian Trans-Am; Super2 Series

Cameron Crick (born 25 October 1997) is a racing driver from Australia who has competed in the Super2 Series for Eggleston Motorsport. Crick is the son of six-time Australian Truck Racing champion Rodney Crick.

== Career results ==
=== Summary ===
Season	Series	Position	Car	Team
2016	Toyota 86 Racing Series Australia	13th	Toyota 86 Mk.1	Ultimate Karting Sydney Racing
2017	Toyota 86 Racing Series Australia	15th	Toyota 86 Mk.1	Sieders Racing Team
2017	Australian V8 Ute Racing Series	33rd	Holden Commodore VE Ute	Sieders Racing Team
2018	Toyota 86 Racing Series Australia	**3rd**	Toyota 86 Mk.1	Clinton Toyota
2018	SuperUtes Series	14th	Mitsubishi Triton	Sieders Racing Team
2019	SuperUtes Series	**2nd**	Mitsubishi Triton	Sieders Racing Team
2019	Porsche Sprint Challenge Australia	9th	Porsche 991 GT3 Cup	Garth Walden Racing
2019	Toyota Gazoo Racing Australia 86 Series	49th	Toyota 86 Mk.1	Sieders Racing Team
2020	Australian National Trans-Am Series	6th	Dodge Challenger	Crick Motorsport
2020	Toyota Gazoo Racing Australia 86 Series	– (Note: Cancelled due to Covid-19 pandemic)	Toyota 86 Mk.1	Sieders Racing Team
2021	Toyota Gazoo Racing Australia 86 Series	– (Note: Not enough rounds were held to declare series results.)	Toyota 86 Mk.1	Sieders Racing Team
2021	V8 SuperUtes Series	**3rd**	Mitsubishi Triton	Team Triton
2022	Super2 Series	12th	Holden Commodore VF	Eggleston Motorsport
2023	Super2 Series	11th	Holden Commodore ZB	Eggleston Motorsport
2023	V8 SuperUtes Series	22nd	Isuzu D-Max	DA Campbell Transport
2024	V8 SuperUte Series	4th	Ford Ranger	SCTR Racing
2024	Super2 Series	18th	Holden Commodore ZB	Eggleston Motorsport
2024	Supercars Championship	34th	Chevrolet Camaro Mk.6	Matt Stone Racing
2025	Supercars Championship	27th	Chevrolet Camaro Mk.6	Matt Stone Racing

=== V8 Superute Series results ===
(key) (Race results only)

SuperUtes Series results
Year	Team	Car	1	2	3	4	5	6	7	8	9	10	11	12	13	14	15	16	17	18	19	20	21	22	23	24	Position	Points
2018	Sieders Racing Team	Mitsubishi Triton	ADE; R1	ADE; R2	ADE; R3	WIN; R4	WIN; R5	WIN; R6	TOW; R7	TOW; R8	TOW; R9	QLD; R10; 5	QLD; R11; 9	QLD; R12; 2	SAN; R13	SAN; R14	SAN; R15	BAT; R16	BAT; R17	BAT; R18	SUR; R19; 4	SUR; R20; 4	SUR; R21; Ret	NEW; R22	NEW; R23	NEW; R24	14th	146
2019	Sieders Racing Team	Mitsubishi Triton	ADE; R1; 3	ADE; R2; 5	ADE; R3; 8	WAN; R4; Ret	WAN; R5; 4	WAN; R6; 3	**WIN**; **R7**; **1**	WIN; R8; 4	WIN; R9; 3	**TOW**; **R10**; **1**	TOW; R11; 4	TOW; R12; 1	QLD; R13; 3	QLD; R14; 3	QLD; R15; 4	**BAT**; **R16**; **1**	BAT; R17; Ret	BAT; R18; 2	SUR; R19; 4	SUR; R20; 1	SUR; R21; 4	NEW; R22; 2	NEW; R23; 3	NEW; R24; 1	**2nd**	**1136**
2021	Sieders Racing Team	Mitsubishi Triton	BEN; R1; 3	BEN; R2; 2	BEN; R3; 3	SMP; R4; 1	SMP; R5; Ret	SMP; R6; 3	SMP2; R7; 8	SMP2; R8; 3	SMP2; R9; 1	SMP2; R10; 1	BAT; R11; 3	BAT; R12; 4	BAT; R13; 1	BAT; R14; 3											**3rd**	515
2023	DA Campbell Transport	Isuzu D-Max	WAN; R1	WAN; R2	WAN; R3	WAN; R4	SMP; R5	SMP; R6	SMP; R7	SMP; R8	BEN; R9; 2	BEN; R10; 1	BEN; R11; 1	BEN; R12; C	SAN; R13	SAN; R14	SAN; R15	SAN; R16	BAT; R17	BAT; R18	BAT; R19	BAT; R20					25th	178
2024	SCTR Racing	Ford Ranger	BAT; R1; 4	BAT; R2; 1	BAT; R3; 3	BAT; R4; 11	HID; R5; 7	HID; R6; 1	HID; R7; 2	HID; R8; 19	SMP; R9; 1	SMP; R10; 5	SMP; R11; 1	SMP; R12; 2	BAT; R13; 4	BAT; R14; 4	BAT; R15; 5	BAT; R16; 4	SUR; R17; 1	SUR; R18; 8	SUR; R19; 2	SUR; R20; 2	ADE; R21; 2	ADE; R22; 14	ADE; R23; 5	ADE; R24; DNS	4th	1155

=== Super2 Series results ===
(key) (Race results only)

Super2 Series results
Year	Team	No.	Car	1	2	3	4	5	6	7	8	9	10	11	12	Position	Points
2022	Eggleston Motorsport	38	Holden Commodore VF	SMP; R1; 9	SMP; R2; 14	WAN; R3; 8	WAN; R4; 11	TOW; R5; 12	TOW; R6; Ret	SAN; R7; 15	SAN; R8; 7	BAT; R9; 8	BAT; R10; C	ADE; R11; Ret	ADE; R12; 9	12th	708
2023	Eggleston Motorsport	38	Holden Commodore ZB	NEW; R1; 10	NEW; R2; Ret	WAN; R3; 14	WAN; R4; 12	TOW; R5; 2	TOW; R6; 9	SAN; R7; 11	SAN; R8; Ret	BAT; R9; 9	BAT; R10; 11	ADE; R11; 4	ADE; R12; 7	11th	876
2024	Eggleston Motorsport	38	Holden Commodore ZB	BAT1; R1; 9	BAT1; R2; 15	WAN; R3; 9	WAN; R4; 9	TOW; R5; 7	TOW; R6; 18	SAN; R7	SAN; R8	BAT2; R9	BAT2; R10	ADE; R11	ADE; R12	18th	459

=== Supercars Championship results ===
(key) (Races in bold indicate pole position) (Races in italics indicate fastest lap)

Supercars results
Year	Team	No.	Car	1	2	3	4	5	6	7	8	9	10	11	12	13	14	15	16	17	18	19	20	21	22	23	24	25	26	27	28	29	30	31	32	33	34	Position	Points
2024	Matt Stone Racing	4	Chevrolet Camaro ZL1	BAT1; R1	BAT1; R2	MEL; R3	MEL; R4	MEL; R5	MEL; R6	TAU; R7	TAU; R8	BAR; R9	BAR; R10	HID; R11	HID; R12	TOW; R13	TOW; R14	SMP; R15	SMP; R16	BEN; R17	BEN; R18	SAN; R19; 10	BAT; R20; 10	SUR; R21	SUR; R22	ADE; R23	ADE; R24											34th	312
2025	Matt Stone Racing	35	Chevrolet Camaro ZL1	SYD; R1; 25	SYD; R2; 18	SYD; R3; 24	MEL; R4	MEL; R5	MEL; R6	MEL; R7	TAU; R8	TAU; R9	TAU; R10	SYM; R11	SYM; R12	SYM; R13	BAR; R14	BAR; R15	BAR; R16	HID; R17	HID; R18	HID; R19	TOW; R20	TOW; R21	TOW; R22	QLD; R23; 21	QLD; R24; 22	QLD; R25; 26	BEN; R26; 26	BAT; R27; 15	SUR; R28	SUR; R29	SAN; R30	SAN; R31	ADE; R32	ADE; R33	ADE; R34	27th	233

=== Complete Bathurst 1000 results ===
Year	Team	Car	Co-driver	Position	Laps
2024	Matt Stone Racing	Chevrolet Camaro Mk.6	(Australia) Cameron Hill	10th	161
2025	Matt Stone Racing	Chevrolet Camaro Mk.6	(Australia) Aaron Seton	15th	161

=== Complete Bathurst 6 Hour results ===
Year	Team	Co-drivers	Car	Class	Laps	Pos.	Class pos.
2022	(Australia) D.A Campbell Transport	(Australia) Dean Campbell	Mitsubishi Lancer Evolution X	A1	52	DNF	DNF
2023	(Australia) D.A Campbell Transport	(Australia) Dean Campbell	Mitsubishi Lancer Evolution X	A1	112	9th	**1st**
2024	(Australia) D.A Campbell Transport	(Australia) Dean Campbell	BMW M2 Competition	X	114	24th	6th
2025	(Australia) D.A Campbell Transport	(Australia) Dean Campbell	BMW M2 Competition	X	122	**1st**	**1st**
