= 2018 SuperUtes Series =

Australian motor racing competition

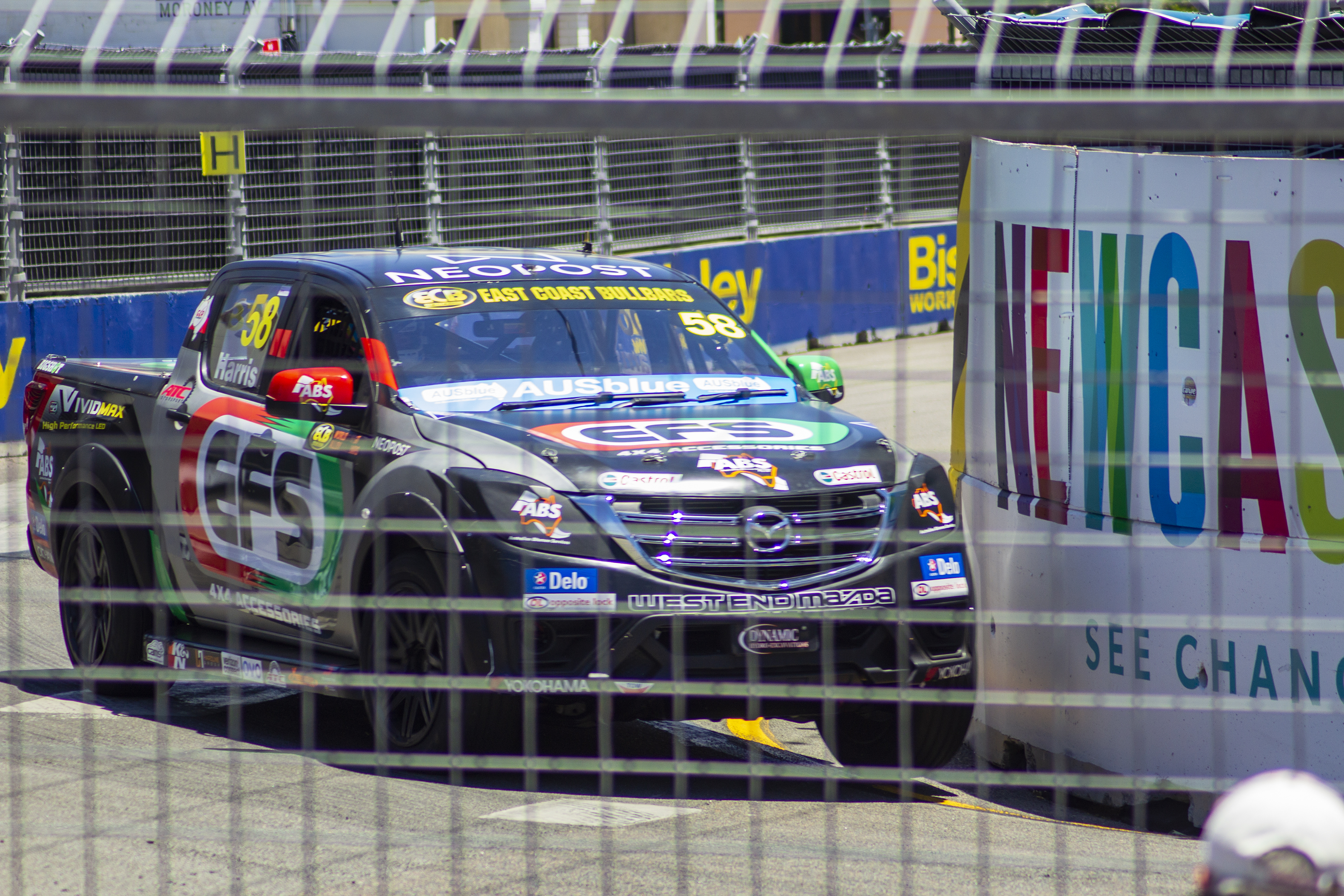
Ryal Harris won the series in a Mazda BT-50

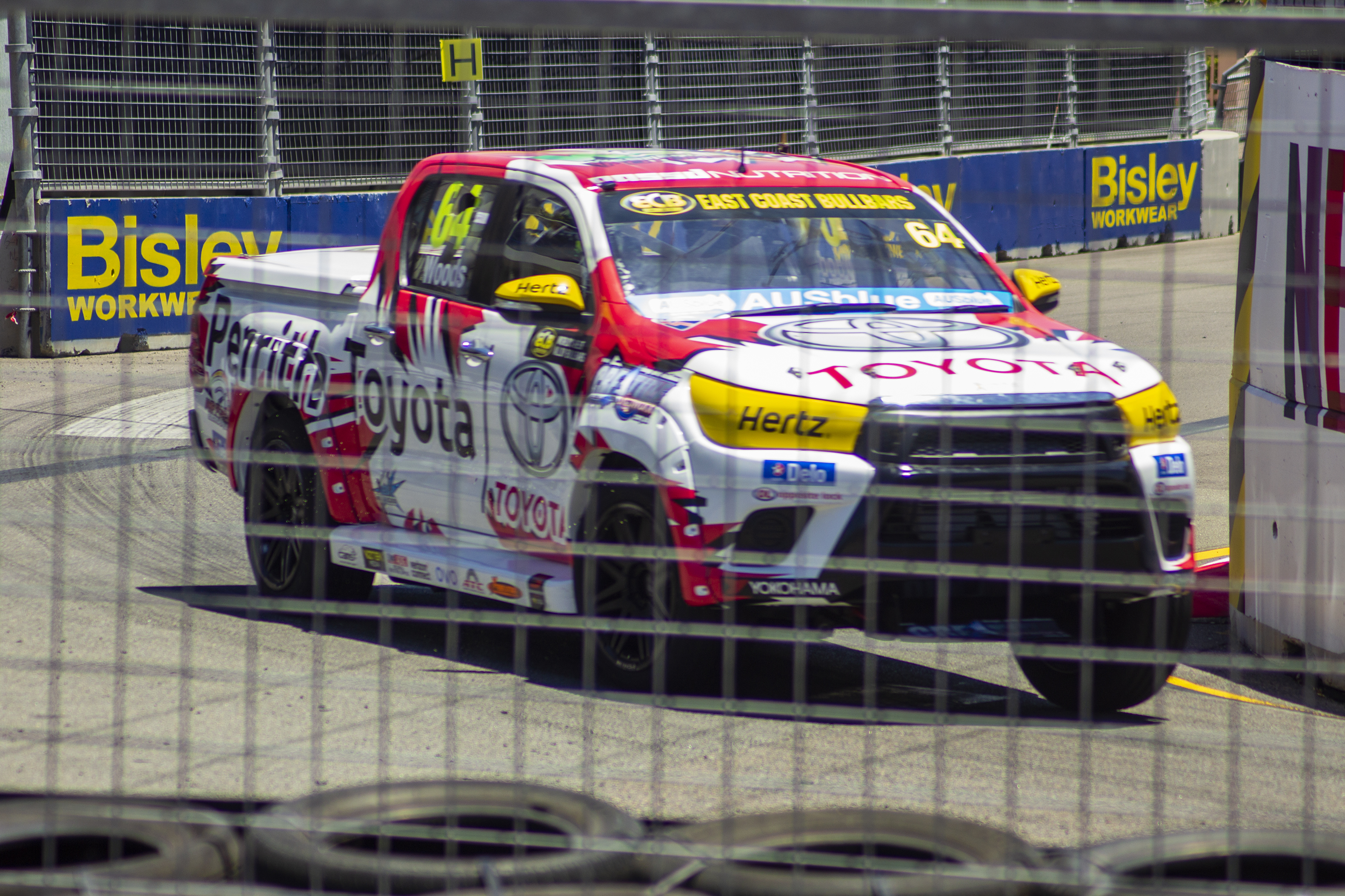
Craig Woods finished runner-up in a Toyota Hilux

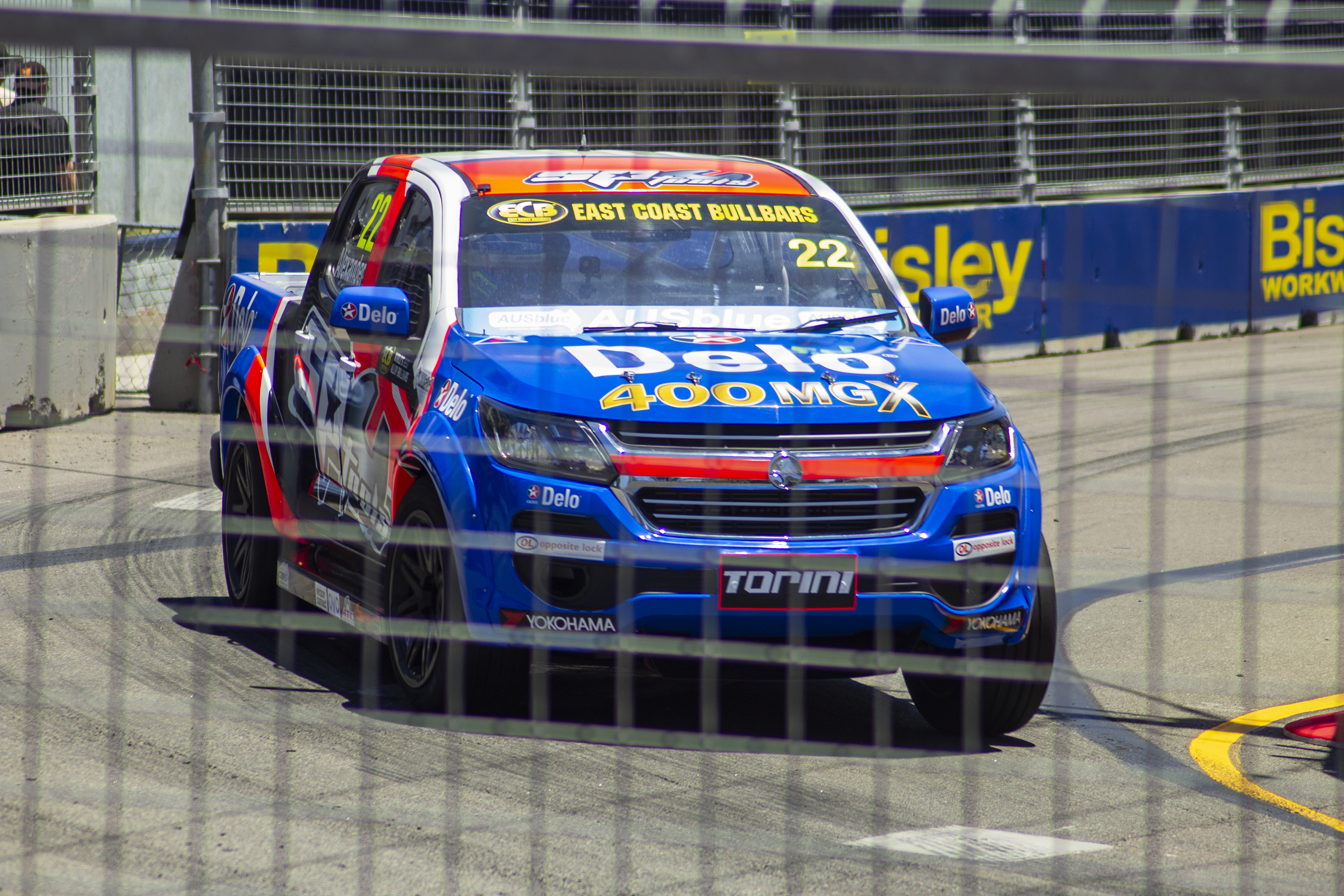
Tom Alexander finished 3rd in a Holden Colorado

The 2018 ECB SuperUtes Series was an Australian motor racing competition for SuperUtes. It was inaugural running of the series. It commenced at the Adelaide Street Circuit on March 1 and concluded at the Newcastle Street Circuit on November 25.

The series was won by Ryal Harris driving a Mazda BT-50.

== Teams and drivers ==
The following teams and drivers contested the series.

Manufacturer	Vehicle	Team	No	Drivers	Rounds
Ford	Ford Ranger (T6)	Sieders Racing Team	34	(Australia) David Sieders	6
Ford	Ford Ranger (T6)	Ranger Racing	49	(Australia) Christopher Formosa	All
Ford	Ford Ranger (T6)	Ranger Racing	94	(Australia) Richard Mork	7–8
Holden	Holden Colorado	Team 18	18	(Australia) Thomas Gasperak	1–7
Holden	Holden Colorado	Team 18	18	(Australia) Justin Ruggier	8
Holden	Holden Colorado	Ross Stone Racing	22	(New Zealand) Tom Alexander	All
Isuzu	Isuzu D-Max	Steve Wilson Racing	1	(Australia) Kim Jane	6–7
Isuzu	Isuzu D-Max	Steve Wilson Racing	3	(Australia) Stephen Wilson	2, 4–5, 8
Mazda	Mazda BT-50	Peters Motorsport	58	(Australia) Ryal Harris	All
Mazda	Mazda BT-50	Peters Motorsport	95	(Australia) Aaron Cameron	All
Mitsubishi	Mitsubishi Triton	Sieders Racing Team	45	(Australia) Michael Sieders	4–8
Mitsubishi	Mitsubishi Triton	Sieders Racing Team	45	(Australia) Craig Dontas	2–3
Mitsubishi	Mitsubishi Triton	Sieders Racing Team	50	(Australia) Craig Dontas	1
Mitsubishi	Mitsubishi Triton	Sieders Racing Team	87	(Australia) Toby Price	1–2
Mitsubishi	Mitsubishi Triton	Sieders Racing Team	87	(Australia) Elliot Barbour	3, 5
Mitsubishi	Mitsubishi Triton	Sieders Racing Team	87	(Australia) Cameron Crick	4, 7
Mitsubishi	Mitsubishi Triton	Sieders Racing Team	87	(Australia) Craig Dontas	6
Mitsubishi	Mitsubishi Triton	Sieders Racing Team	87	(Australia) Aaren Russell	8
Toyota	Toyota Hilux (AN120)	Western Sydney Motorsport	8	(Australia) Ben Walsh	All
Toyota	Toyota Hilux (AN120)	Western Sydney Motorsport	52	(Australia) Charlotte Poynting	6, 8
Toyota	Toyota Hilux (AN120)	Western Sydney Motorsport	64	(Australia) Craig Woods	All
Toyota	Toyota Hilux (AN120)	Sieders Racing Team	52	(Australia) Luke van Herwaade	7
Toyota	Toyota Hilux (AN120)	Sieders Racing Team	99	(Australia) Matthew MacKelden	All

== Calendar ==
The calendar for the 2018 season was announced at the 2017 Newcastle 500 event. The calendar comprised eight rounds, each supporting a Supercars Championship event, starting at the Adelaide Street Circuit on 1 March and concluding at Newcastle Street Circuit on 25 November.

Rnd		Circuit	Date	Pole position	Fastest lap	Winning driver	Winning team
1	R1	Adelaide Street Circuit (Adelaide, South Australia)	March 1–4	(Australia) Ryal Harris	(Australia) Ryal Harris	(Australia) Ryal Harris	Peters Motorsport
1	R2	Adelaide Street Circuit (Adelaide, South Australia)	March 1–4		(Australia) Ryal Harris	(New Zealand) Tom Alexander	Ross Stone Racing
1	R3	Adelaide Street Circuit (Adelaide, South Australia)	March 1–4		(Australia) Ryal Harris	(Australia) Ryal Harris	Peters Motorsport
2	R1	(Victoria (state)) Winton Motor Raceway (Benalla, Victoria)	May 18–20	(New Zealand) Tom Alexander	(New Zealand) Tom Alexander	(New Zealand) Tom Alexander	Ross Stone Racing
2	R2	(Victoria (state)) Winton Motor Raceway (Benalla, Victoria)	May 18–20		(New Zealand) Tom Alexander	(Australia) Ryal Harris	Peters Motorsport
2	R3	(Victoria (state)) Winton Motor Raceway (Benalla, Victoria)	May 18–20		(Australia) Toby Price	(New Zealand) Tom Alexander	Ross Stone Racing
3	R1	Townsville Street Circuit (Townsville, Queensland)	July 6–8	(Australia) Craig Dontas	(Australia) Craig Dontas	(Australia) Craig Dontas	Sieders Racing Team
3	R2	Townsville Street Circuit (Townsville, Queensland)	July 6–8		(Australia) Aaron Cameron	(Australia) Ryal Harris	Peters Motorsport
3	R3	Townsville Street Circuit (Townsville, Queensland)	July 6–8		(Australia) Aaron Cameron	(Australia) Ryal Harris	Peters Motorsport
4	R1	Queensland Raceway (Ipswich, Queensland)	July 20–22	(New Zealand) Tom Alexander	(Australia) Ryal Harris	(Australia) Ryal Harris	Peters Motorsport
4	R2	Queensland Raceway (Ipswich, Queensland)	July 20–22		(Australia) Ryal Harris	(New Zealand) Tom Alexander	Ross Stone Racing
4	R3	Queensland Raceway (Ipswich, Queensland)	July 20–22		(Australia) Cameron Crick	(Australia) Craig Woods	Western Sydney Motorsport
5	R1	(Victoria (state)) Sandown Raceway (Melbourne, Victoria)	September 14–16	(Australia) Elliot Barbour	(Australia) Elliot Barbour	(Australia) Elliot Barbour	Sieders Racing Team
5	R2	(Victoria (state)) Sandown Raceway (Melbourne, Victoria)	September 14–16		(New Zealand) Tom Alexander	(Australia) Michael Sieders	Sieders Racing Team
5	R3	(Victoria (state)) Sandown Raceway (Melbourne, Victoria)	September 14–16		(Australia) Michael Sieders	(Australia) Elliot Barbour	Sieders Racing Team
6	R1	Mount Panorama Circuit (Bathurst, New South Wales)	October 4–7	(Australia) Craig Dontas	(Australia) Ryal Harris	(Australia) Ryal Harris	Peters Motorsport
6	R2	Mount Panorama Circuit (Bathurst, New South Wales)	October 4–7		(Australia) David Sieders	(Australia) Ryal Harris	Peters Motorsport
6	R3	Mount Panorama Circuit (Bathurst, New South Wales)	October 4–7		(Australia) Ryal Harris	(Australia) Ryal Harris	Peters Motorsport
7	R1	Surfers Paradise Street Circuit (Gold Coast, Queensland)	October 19–21	(Australia) Ryal Harris	(Australia) Craig Woods	(Australia) Ryal Harris	Peters Motorsport
7	R2	Surfers Paradise Street Circuit (Gold Coast, Queensland)	October 19–21		(Australia) Aaron Cameron	(Australia) Aaron Cameron	Peters Motorsport
7	R3	Surfers Paradise Street Circuit (Gold Coast, Queensland)	October 19–21		(Australia) Ryal Harris	(Australia) Craig Woods	Western Sydney Motorsport
8	R1	Newcastle Street Circuit (Newcastle, New South Wales)	November 23–25	(New Zealand) Tom Alexander	(Australia) Aaren Russell	(New Zealand) Tom Alexander	Ross Stone Racing
8	R2	Newcastle Street Circuit (Newcastle, New South Wales)	November 23–25		(New Zealand) Tom Alexander	(Australia) Ryal Harris	Peters Motorsport
8	R3	Newcastle Street Circuit (Newcastle, New South Wales)	November 23–25		(New Zealand) Tom Alexander	(New Zealand) Tom Alexander	Ross Stone Racing

== Series standings ==
Standings at the completion of Round 6 were Bathurst

Pos.	Driver	(South Australia) ADE			(Victoria (state)) WIN			(Queensland) TOW			(Queensland) QUE			(Victoria (state)) SAN			(New South Wales) BAT			(Queensland) SUR			(New South Wales) NEW			Pts.
1	(Australia) Ryal Harris	1	Ret	1	5	1	2	10	1	1	1	2	6	3	11	6	1	1	1	1	2	4	7	1	3	1098
2	(Australia) Craig Woods	2	2	2	6	3	5	4	4	2	3	4	1	4	3	4	7	4	7	3	5	1	3	9	Ret	1060
3	(New Zealand) Tom Alexander	3	1	Ret	1	9	1	5	6	Ret	2	1	5	6	4	5	5	7	4	2	7	2	1	4	1	1023
4	(Australia) Ben Walsh	7	4	Ret	9	4	7	6	3	5	11	5	4	2	6	2	3	3	5	5	12	5	5	3	2	994
5	(Australia) Aaron Cameron	5	Ret	3	2	2	4	3	Ret	4	7	10	3	5	10	7	4	8	6	7	1	9	4	Ret	5	935
6	(Australia) Matthew MacKelden	6	3	6	8	7	8	9	8	8	6	Ret	DNS	8	5	8	9	6	8	9	6	7	10	2	6	901
7	(Australia) Thomas Gasperak	8	7	8	7	5	6	7	5	6	9	6	8	9	8	9	Ret	Ret	Ret	Ret	9	8				714
8	(Australia) Christopher Formosa	Ret	Ret	7	DNS	10	10	2	Ret	DNS	8	7	7	10	7	11	10	10	10	8	10	6	9	DNS	DNS	673
9	(Australia) Michael Sieders										4	3	Ret	7	1	3	12	9	9	DNS	8	10	6	8	7	483
10	(Australia) Craig Dontas	Ret	6	5	4	Ret	Ret	1	7	7							2	2	2							458
11	(Australia) Steve Wilson				10	8	9				10	8	9	11	9	10							13	Ret	DNS	352
12	(Australia) Elliot Barbour							8	2	3				1	2	1										321
13	(Australia) Toby Price	4	5	4	3	6	3																			295
14	(Australia) Cameron Crick										5	9	2							4	4	Ret				146
15	(Australia) Richard Mork																			10	11	Ret	11	5	9	144
16	(Australia) Charlotte Poynting																11	11	12				12	10	8	115
17	(Australia) Kim Jane																8	Ret	11							94
18	(Australia) David Sieders																6	5	3							0
19	(Australia) Justin Ruggier																						8	6	4	0
20	(Australia) Luke van Herwaarde																			6	3	3				0
21	(Australia) Aaren Russell																						2	7	Ret	0
