= 2019 SuperUtes Series =

Australian motor racing competition

The 2019 SuperUtes Series (known for commercial reasons as the 2019 ECB SuperUtes Series) was the second running of the series. The season started at the Adelaide Street Circuit on March 1 and concluded at Newcastle Street Circuit on November 24.

== Teams and drivers ==
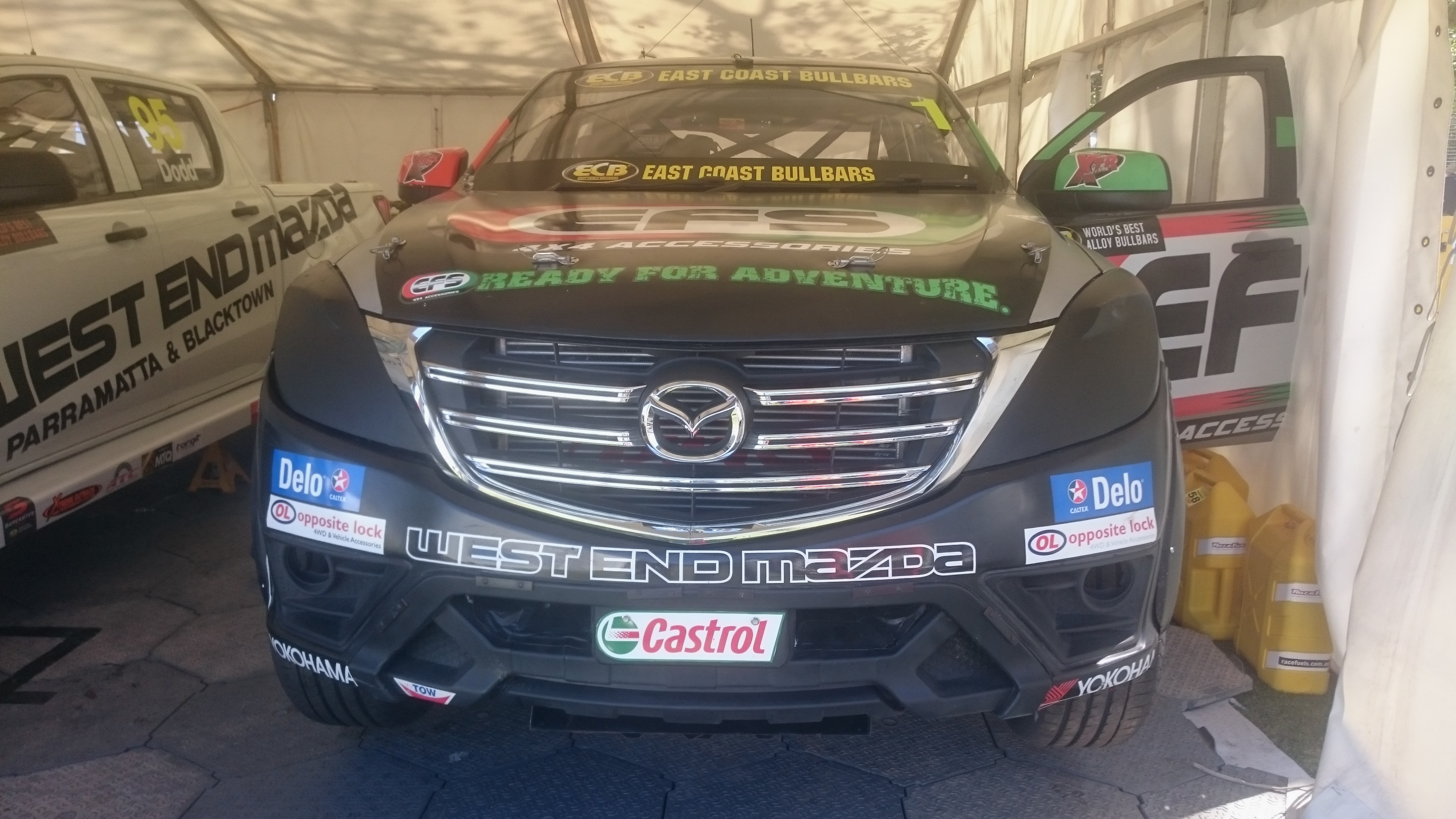
Ryal Harris placed third in the series driving a Mazda BT-50

Manufacturer	Vehicle	Team	No	Drivers	Rounds
Ford	Ford Ranger	Ranger Racing	49	(Australia) Christopher Formosa	All
Ford	Ford Ranger	Ranger Racing	94	(Australia) Jeff Watters	3
Ford	Ford Ranger	Ranger Racing	94	(Australia) Bayley Hall	6
Isuzu	Isuzu D-Max	Ross Stone Racing	22	(New Zealand) Tom Alexander	All
Holden	Holden Colorado	Team 18	18	(Australia) Dean Canto	1
Holden	Holden Colorado	Team 18	18	(Australia) Peter Major	2
Holden	Holden Colorado	Team 18	18	(New Zealand) Steven Richards	5
Holden	Holden Colorado	Team 18	18	(Australia) Nathan Pretty	6
Holden	Holden Colorado	"Ronnie Conquest"	11	(Australia) "Ronnie Conquest" (Note: Gilbert Slade was originally entered in the car, however "Conquest" replaced him for qualifying and the races.)	2
Holden	Holden Colorado	Trik Trailers	11	(Australia) Kevin Stoopman	3
Holden	Holden Colorado	Peters Motorsport	11	(Australia) Madison Dunston	4
Holden	Holden Colorado	Peters Motorsport	11	(New Zealand) Matt Spratt	6
Holden	Holden Colorado	Peters Motorsport	17	(Australia) Ben Falk	1
Mazda	Mazda BT-50	Peters Motorsport	17	(Australia) Ben Falk	2-3, 5-8
Mazda	Mazda BT-50	Peters Motorsport	1	(Australia) Ryal Harris	All
Mazda	Mazda BT-50	Peters Motorsport	95	(Australia) Adam Dodd	1
Mitsubishi	Mitsbushi Triton	Sieders Racing Team	7	(Australia) Cameron Crick	All
Mitsubishi	Mitsbushi Triton	Sieders Racing Team	78	(Australia) Elliot Barbour	1–2
Mitsubishi	Mitsbushi Triton	Sieders Racing Team	87	(Australia) Craig Dontas	1
Mitsubishi	Mitsbushi Triton	Sieders Racing Team	87	(Australia) Toby Price	3–5, 7
Mitsubishi	Mitsbushi Triton	Sieders Racing Team	87	(Australia) Elliot Barbour	6, 8
Mitsubishi	Mitsbushi Triton	Sieders Racing Team	96	(Australia) Jaiden Maggs	3, 7
Mitsubishi	Mitsbushi Triton	Sieders Racing Team	96	(Australia) Charlotte Poynting	5
Mitsubishi	Mitsbushi Triton	Sieders Racing Team	96	(Australia) Graham Edwards	6
Toyota	Toyota Hilux	Sieders Racing Team	10	(Australia) Michael Sieders	1–2
Toyota	Toyota Hilux	Sieders Racing Team	11	(Australia) Luke van Herwaarde	1
Toyota	Toyota Hilux	Sieders Racing Team	68	(Australia) Gerard Maggs	3, 7
Toyota	Toyota Hilux	Sieders Racing Team	68	(Australia) Jeff Watters	5
Toyota	Toyota Hilux	Sieders Racing Team	68	(Australia) Josh Anderson	6
Toyota	Toyota Hilux	Sieders Racing Team	68	(Australia) Layton Barker	8
Toyota	Toyota Hilux	Western Sydney Motorsport	8	(Australia) Ben Walsh	All
Toyota	Toyota Hilux	Western Sydney Motorsport	64	(Australia) Craig Woods	All
Toyota	Toyota Hilux	Western Sydney Motorsport	72	(Australia) Craig Thompson	3–6, 8

=== Driver Changes ===
- Cameron Crick Competed full time, after competing in 2 rounds in 2018

=== Team changes ===
- Ross Stone Racing switched from running a Holden Colorado to an Isuzu D-Max.

== Calendar ==
Rnd		Circuit	Date	Pole position	Fastest lap	Winning driver	Winning team
1	R1	Adelaide Street Circuit (Adelaide, South Australia)	March 1–3	(Australia) Ryal Harris	(Australia) Luke van Herwaarde	(Australia) Luke van Herwaarde	Sieders Racing Team
1	R2	Adelaide Street Circuit (Adelaide, South Australia)	March 1–3		(New Zealand) Tom Alexander	(Australia) Ryal Harris	Peters Motorsport
1	R3	Adelaide Street Circuit (Adelaide, South Australia)	March 1–3		(New Zealand) Tom Alexander	(Australia) Ryal Harris	Peters Motorsport
2	R1	Barbagallo Raceway (Neerabup, Western Australia)	May 2–4	(Australia) Ben Walsh	(Australia) Michael Sieders	(New Zealand) Tom Alexander	Ross Stone Racing
2	R2	Barbagallo Raceway (Neerabup, Western Australia)	May 2–4		(Australia) Elliot Barbour	(Australia) Ryal Harris	Peters Motorsport
2	R3	Barbagallo Raceway (Neerabup, Western Australia)	May 2–4		(Australia) Michael Sieders	(New Zealand) Tom Alexander	Ross Stone Racing
3	R1	(Victoria (state)) Winton Motor Raceway (Benalla, Victoria)	May 24–26	(Australia) Cameron Crick	(Australia) Toby Price	(Australia) Cameron Crick	Sieders Racing Team
3	R2	(Victoria (state)) Winton Motor Raceway (Benalla, Victoria)	May 24–26		(Australia) Cameron Crick	(Australia) Ryal Harris	Peters Motorsport
3	R3	(Victoria (state)) Winton Motor Raceway (Benalla, Victoria)	May 24–26		(Australia) Toby Price	(Australia) Toby Price	Sieders Racing Team
4	R1	Townsville Street Circuit (Townsville, Queensland)	July 5–7	(Australia) Cameron Crick	(Australia) Cameron Crick	(Australia) Cameron Crick	Sieders Racing Team
4	R2	Townsville Street Circuit (Townsville, Queensland)	July 5–7		(New Zealand) Tom Alexander	(Australia) Ryal Harris	Peters Motorsport
4	R3	Townsville Street Circuit (Townsville, Queensland)	July 5–7		(Australia) Cameron Crick	(Australia) Cameron Crick	Sieders Racing Team
5	R1	Queensland Raceway (Ipswich, Queensland)	July 26–28	(Australia) Ryal Harris	(Australia) Cameron Crick	(Australia) Ryal Harris	Peters Motorsport
5	R2	Queensland Raceway (Ipswich, Queensland)	July 26–28		(Australia) Cameron Crick	(Australia) Toby Price	Sieders Racing Team
5	R3	Queensland Raceway (Ipswich, Queensland)	July 26–28		(New Zealand) Steven Richards	(Australia) Toby Price	Sieders Racing Team
6	R1	Mount Panorama Circuit (Bathurst, New South Wales)	October 10–13	(Australia) Cameron Crick	(Australia) Cameron Crick	(Australia) Cameron Crick	Sieders Racing Team
6	R2	Mount Panorama Circuit (Bathurst, New South Wales)	October 10–13		(New Zealand) Tom Alexander	(New Zealand) Tom Alexander	Ross Stone Racing
6	R3	Mount Panorama Circuit (Bathurst, New South Wales)	October 10–13		(New Zealand) Tom Alexander	(Australia) Nathan Pretty	Team 18
7	R1	Surfers Paradise Street Circuit (Surfers Paradise, Queensland)	October 25–27	(New Zealand) Tom Alexander	(Australia) Ryal Harris	(Australia) Ryal Harris	Peters Motorsport
7	R2	Surfers Paradise Street Circuit (Surfers Paradise, Queensland)	October 25–27		(Australia) Ryal Harris	(Australia) Cameron Crick	Sieders Racing Team
7	R3	Surfers Paradise Street Circuit (Surfers Paradise, Queensland)	October 25–27		(Australia) Ryal Harris	(New Zealand) Tom Alexander	Ross Stone Racing
8	R1	Newcastle Street Circuit (Newcastle, New South Wales)	November 22–24	(New Zealand) Tom Alexander	(New Zealand) Tom Alexander	(New Zealand) Tom Alexander	Ross Stone Racing
8	R2	Newcastle Street Circuit (Newcastle, New South Wales)	November 22–24		(Australia) Craig Woods	(Australia) Craig Woods	Western Sydney Motorsport
8	R3	Newcastle Street Circuit (Newcastle, New South Wales)	November 22–24		(Australia) Ryal Harris	(Australia) Cameron Crick	Sieders Racing Team

=== Calendar Changes ===
- Barbagallo Raceway was added as the second event of the season
- The round at Sandown was dropped for 2019

== Series standings ==
Pos.	Driver	ADE			PER			WIN			TSV			IPS			BAT			GCS			NEW			Points
1	(New Zealand) Tom Alexander	9	2	2	1	8	1	5	2	2	4	2	4	4	Ret	5	6	1	3	2	3	1	1	2	2	1203
2	(Australia) Cameron Crick	3	5	8	Ret	4	3	1	4	3	1	4	1	3	3	4	1	Ret	2	4	1	4	2	3	1	1136
3	(Australia) Ryal Harris	10	1	1	4	1	7	3	1	Ret	3	1	2	1	4	2	4	Ret	DNS	1	2	2	3	Ret	4	1053
4	(Australia) Ben Walsh	6	Ret	4	3	7	10	2	7	5	5	5	5	2	Ret	7	2	5	4	3	6	3	4	Ret	DNS	985
5	(Australia) Craig Woods	4	Ret	6	Ret	3	5	Ret	5	Ret	6	Ret	6	5	5	3	7	2	6	5	Ret	9	Ret	1	3	781
6	(Australia) Christopher Formosa	Ret	DNS	DNS	DSQ	5	6	10	9	Ret	8	6	9	10	6	9	11	7	8	9	7	Ret	7	4	5	730
7	(Australia) Toby Price							7	3	1	2	3	3	6	1	1				8	Ret	6				575
8	(Australia) Craig Thompson							6	11	9	7	7	7	8	10	8	9	6	7				9	Ret	DNS	552
9	(Australia) Ben Falk	Ret	DNS	DNS	6	Ret	8	11	6	4				7	7	10				6	5	5	8	DNS	DNS	545
10	(Australia) Elliot Barbour	8	3	3	2	2	2										Ret	Ret					5	Ret	DNS	336
11	(Australia) Jaiden Maggs							8	12	7										10	4	8				248
12	(Australia) Michael Sieders	7	4	5	5	6	4																			245
13	(Australia) Gerard Maggs							4	10	10										7	Ret	7				231
14	(Australia) Jeff Watters							12	13	8				9	8	11										229
15	(Australia) Nathan Pretty																3	3	1							163
16	(Australia) Joshua Anderson																5	4	5							141
17	(Australia) Kevin Stoopman							9	8	6																127
18	(Australia) Madison Dunston										9	8	8													123
19	(Australia) Charlotte Poynting													11	10	12										110
20	(Australia) Luke van Herwaarde	1	6	7																						99
21	(New Zealand) Steven Richards													DNS	2	6										87
22	(Australia) Layton Barker																						6	5	Ret	82
23	(Australia) Adam Dodd	2	Ret	9																						64
24	(Australia) Ronnie Conquest				7	DNS	DNS																			52
25	(Australia) Graham Edwards																8	Ret	DNS							50
26	(Australia) Peter Major				Ret	Ret	9																			48
=	(Australia) Matt Spratt																DNS	Ret	9							48
28	(Australia) Bayley Hall																10	Ret	Ret							46
29	(Australia) Craig Dontas	5	Ret	Ret																						19
–	(Australia) Dean Canto	Ret	Ret	DNS																						0
