= 2021 SuperUtes Series =

Australian motor racing competition

The 2021 SuperUtes Series (known for commercial reasons as the 2021 Haltech SuperUtes Series) was the third running season of the motorsport series. The season started at The Bend Motorsport Park on 8 May and concluded at Mount Panorama Circuit 10 October.

== Teams and drivers ==
Manufacturer	Vehicle	Team	No.	Drivers	Rounds
Ford	Ranger	Allgate Racing	49	(Australia) Chris Formosa	All
Ford	Ranger	Allgate Racing	94	(Australia) Michael Formosa	All
Holden	Colorado	George Gutierrez Racing	19	(Australia) George Gutierrez	1
Mazda	BT-50	Craig Jenner Racing	50	(Australia) Craig Jenner	All
Mazda	BT-50	EFS 4x4 Accessories	58	(Australia) Ryal Harris	All
Mitsubishi	Triton	Team Triton	7	(Australia) Cameron Crick	All
Mitsubishi	Triton	Team Triton	45	(Australia) Craig Dontas	1
Mitsubishi	Triton	Sieders Racing Team	45	(Australia) David Sieders	2-4
Mitsubishi	Triton	Sieders Racing Team	68	(Australia) Gerard Maggs	All
Mitsubishi	Triton	Sieders Racing Team	96	(Australia) Jaiden Maggs	All
Toyota	Hilux	Sieders Racing Team	4	(Australia) Aaron Borg	All
Toyota	Hilux	Sieders Racing Team	88	(Australia) Wayne Williams	1
Toyota	Hilux	Sieders Racing Team	88	(Australia) Richard Mork	2, 4
Toyota	Hilux	Sieders Racing Team	88	(Australia) Ellexandra Best	3
Toyota	Hilux	Western Sydney Motorsport	8	(Australia) Ben Walsh	1, 4
Toyota	Hilux	Western Sydney Motorsport	8	(Australia) Matthew McLean	2-3
Toyota	Hilux	Western Sydney Motorsport	64	(Australia) Craig Woods	All

== Calendar ==
Round		Circuit	Date	Pole Position	Fastest Lap	Winning driver	Winning team	Winning Ute
1	R1	The Bend Motorsport Park (Tailem Bend, South Australia)	8-9 May 2021	(Australia) Cameron Crick	(Australia) Ben Walsh	(Australia) Ryal Harris	EFS 4x4 Accessories	Mazda BT-50
1	R2	The Bend Motorsport Park (Tailem Bend, South Australia)	8-9 May 2021		(Australia) Craig Woods	(Australia) Ryal Harris	EFS 4x4 Accessories	Mazda BT-50
1	R3	The Bend Motorsport Park (Tailem Bend, South Australia)	8-9 May 2021		(Australia) Aaron Borg	(Australia) Aaron Borg	Sieders Racing Team	Toyota Hilux
2	R1	Sydney Motorsport Park (Eastern Creek, New South Wales)	29-31 October 2021	(Australia) Aaron Borg	(Australia) Cameron Crick	(Australia) Cameron Crick	Team Triton	Mitsubishi Triton
2	R2	Sydney Motorsport Park (Eastern Creek, New South Wales)	29-31 October 2021		(Australia) Craig Woods	(Australia) Aaron Borg	Sieders Racing Team	Toyota Hilux
2	R3	Sydney Motorsport Park (Eastern Creek, New South Wales)	29-31 October 2021		(Australia) Aaron Borg	(Australia) Aaron Borg	Sieders Racing Team	Toyota Hilux
3	R1	Sydney Motorsport Park (Eastern Creek, New South Wales)	13-14 November 2021	(Australia) Aaron Borg	(Australia) Matthew McLean	(Australia) Ryal Harris	EFS 4x4 Accessories	Mazda BT-50
3	R2	Sydney Motorsport Park (Eastern Creek, New South Wales)	13-14 November 2021		(Australia) Ryal Harris	(Australia) Ryal Harris	EFS 4x4 Accessories	Mazda BT-50
3	R3	Sydney Motorsport Park (Eastern Creek, New South Wales)	13-14 November 2021		(Australia) Cameron Crick	(Australia) Cameron Crick	Team Triton	Mitsubishi Triton
4	R1	Mount Panorama Circuit (Bathurst, New South Wales)	30 Nov-5 Dec 2021	(Australia) Ryal Harris	(Australia) Cameron Crick	(Australia) Ryal Harris	EFS 4x4 Accessories	Mazda BT-50
4	R2	Mount Panorama Circuit (Bathurst, New South Wales)	30 Nov-5 Dec 2021		(Australia) Cameron Crick	(Australia) Ryal Harris	EFS 4x4 Accessories	Mazda BT-50
4	R3	Mount Panorama Circuit (Bathurst, New South Wales)	30 Nov-5 Dec 2021		(Australia) Ryal Harris	(Australia) Cameron Crick (Note: Ryal Harris finished first but was given a 10 second penalty for contact with Aaron Borg)	Team Triton	Mitsubishi Triton
4	R4	Mount Panorama Circuit (Bathurst, New South Wales)	30 Nov-5 Dec 2021		(Australia) Aaron Borg	(Australia) Aaron Borg	Sieders Racing Team	Toyota Hilux
