= 2022 SuperUtes Series =

Pickup truck racing competition

The 2022 V8 SuperUtes Series (known for sponsorship reasons as 2022 Haltech V8 SuperUtes Series) will be the fourth running season of the motorsport series.

== Calendar ==
Rd.	Circuit	City / State	Date
1	(Tasmania) Symmons Plains Raceway	Launceston, Tasmania	26–27 March
2	(Western Australia) Wanneroo Raceway	Neerabup, Western Australia	30 Apr–1 May
3	(Victoria (state)) Winton Motor Raceway	Benalla, Victoria	21–22 May
4	(South Australia) The Bend Motorsport Park	Tailem Bend, South Australia	30–31 July
5	(New South Wales) Mount Panorama Circuit	Bathurst, New South Wales	6–9 October
6	(Queensland) Surfers Paradise Street Circuit	Gold Coast, Queensland	28–30 October

== Teams and drivers ==
Manufacturer	Model	Entrant	No.	Driver Name	Rounds	Ref.
Ford	Ranger	Sieders Racing Team	1	(Australia) Ryal Harris	6	
Ford	Ranger	Sieders Racing Team	3	(Australia) Harry Gray	1–2	
Ford	Ranger	Sieders Racing Team	68	(Australia) Gerard Maggs	3	
Ford	Ranger	Allgate Motorsport	49	(Australia) Chris Formosa	1–3	
Holden	Colorado	Sieders Racing Team	4	(Australia) Aaron Borg	1–3	
Holden	Colorado	Go Sunny Solar	19	(Australia) George Gutierrez	1–3	
Isuzu	D-Max	Sieders Racing Team	5	(Australia) Dave Casey	1–3	
Mazda	BT-50	Craig Jenner Racing	50	(Australia) Craig Jenner	1–3	
Mazda	BT-50	Peters Motorsport	74/75	(Australia) Richard Mork	1–3	
Mitsubishi	Triton	Sieders Racing Team	3	(Australia) David Sieders	2–3	
Mitsubishi	Triton	Sieders Racing Team	3	(Australia) Layton Baker	1	
Mitsubishi	Triton	Sieders Racing Team	45	(Australia) Craig Dontas	1–3	
Mitsubishi	Triton	Sieders Racing Team	45	(Australia) Adam Marjoram	4	
Mitsubishi	Triton	Sieders Racing Team	76	(Australia) Ellexandra Best	6	
Mitsubishi	Triton	Sieders Racing Team	96	(Australia) Jaiden Maggs	1, 3	
Mitsubishi	Triton	Sieders Racing Team	96	(Australia) Josh Hunter	2	
Toyota	Hilux	Western Sydney Motorsport	8	(Australia) Ben Walsh	1–3	
Toyota	Hilux	Western Sydney Motorsport	64	(Australia) Craig Woods	1–3	
Toyota	Hilux	JKD Racing	52	(Australia) Dean Brooking	1–3	
Toyota	Hilux	Sieders Racing Team	88	(Australia) Rohan Berry	1–3	
