= A Day in the Dirt Motocross Grand Prix =

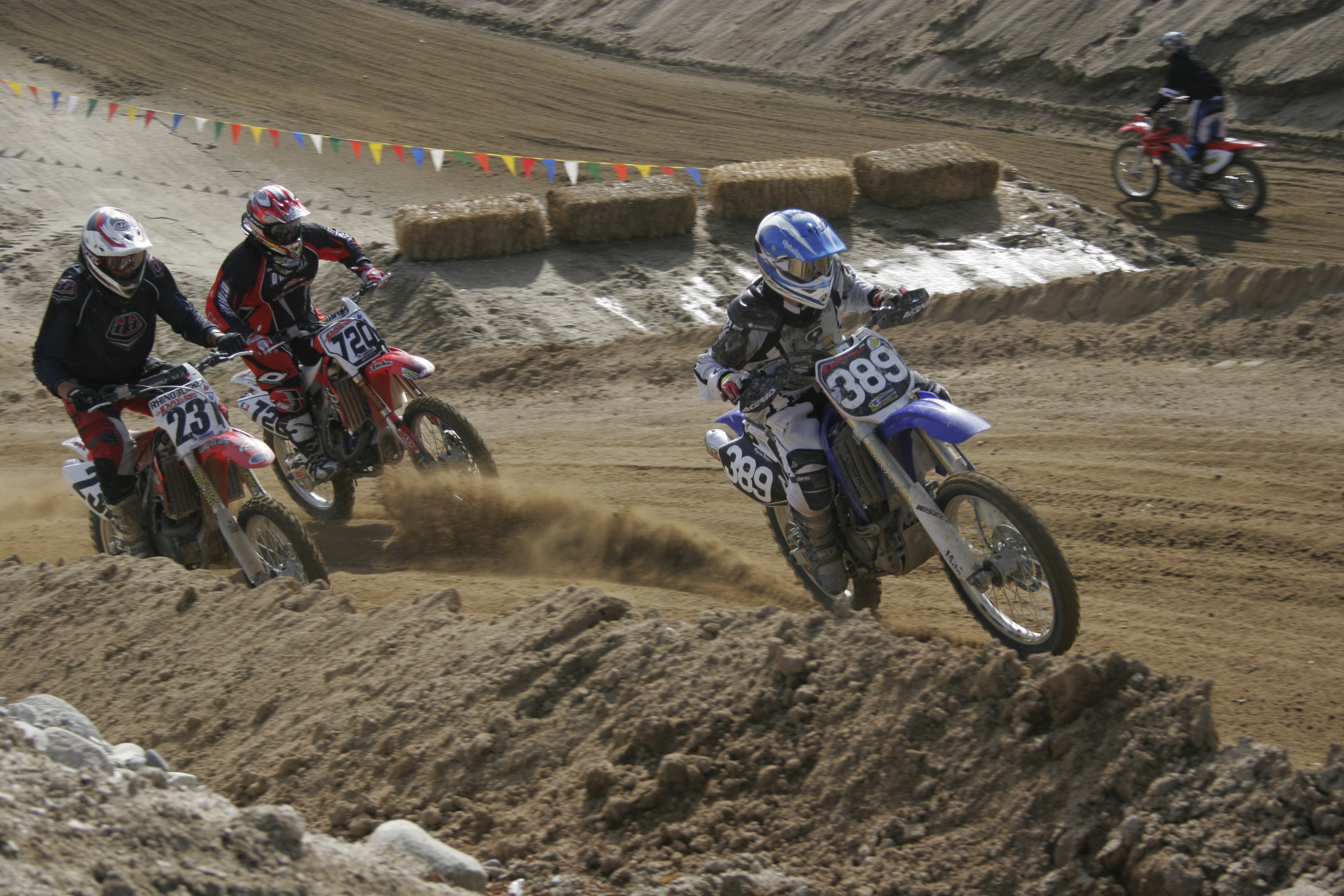

A Day in the Dirt
Region	Southern California, United States
Type	Motocross
Sponsors	Troy Lee Designs, Elrod Racing

History
First race	1998

A Day in the Dirt Motocross Grand Prix is an motocross event held annually since 1998 on Thanksgiving weekend in Southern California, United States. The races are notable for their participants, ranging from Hollywood film and stunt industry professionals like Mike "Mouse" McCoy and Alisa Hensley-Lane, to racing legends such as Ricky Johnson, Jeff Ward, Ron Lechein, Jeremy McGrath, J.N. Roberts, Eric Kehoe, Eddie Mulder, Mike Kiedrrowski, Ryan Hughes, Jeff Emig, Broc Glover, Mike Bell, Micky Dymond, and John DeSoto. The races also attract extreme sports celebrities such as Ronnie Renner, Henry Wiles, Robie and Bret Peterson, Shaun Palmer, Dave Mirra, Mike Metzler, and Alexander Smith.

"A Day in the Dirt" was created by Kenny Alexander, and fellow stuntman Jimmy Roberts. The race was inspired by actor and motorcycle racer Steve McQueen, and the proceeds from practice sessions go to the Steve McQueen Memorial fund for Boys Republic.

Roberts' and Alexander's fathers were members of the Viewfinders, an off-road motorcycle club formed in the early days of desert racing by stuntmen in the motion picture industry. Jimmy Roberts is a Hollywood stuntman who has worked on notable films such as M:I-2, The Fast and the Furious and Paycheck.

A documentary about "A Day in the Dirt" was produced by Kenny Alexander. Actor Mark-Paul Gosselaar, narrated the film, which is shot at the 2002 edition. Stuntman Mike "Mouse" McCoy is featured in the film, "joining forces and competing with top athletes for bragging rights at the finish line."

The event was originally held at Los Angeles County Raceway in Palmdale, except in 2006 when it took place at Competitive Edge MX Park in Hesperia. It moved to Pala for 2010 and 2011. The event is held at Glen Helen since 2012. Sister events have been held at other places: High Point, PennSylvania ("Day in the Dirt Out East"), Florida ("Day in the Dirt Down South") and Australia ("Day in the Dirt Down Under").
