= Toby Price =

Australian motorcycle racer (born 1987)

Toby Price OAM
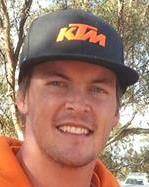

Personal information
- Full name: Toby Joseph Price
- Nationality: Australian
- Born: 18 August 1987 (age 39) Hillston, New South Wales
- Website: www.tp87.com.au

Sport
- Country: Australia
- Sport: Off-Road Racing
- Team: Toyota Gazoo Racing W2RC

Achievements and titles
- World finals: 2014 International Six Days Enduro (ISDE) E3; 2014 Day In The Dirt; 2016 Dakar Rally; 2016 Abu Dhabi Desert Challenge; 2016 Rallye OiLibya du Maroc; 2018 Rallye OiLibya du Maroc; 2018 FIM Cross-Country Rallies World Championship; 2019 Dakar Rally; 2023 Rallye du Maroc; 2024 Baja 500
- National finals: 2009 Australian Off-Road Championship (AORC); 2010 Australian Off-Road Championship (AORC); 2010 Finke Desert Race; 2010 Hattah Desert Race; 2010 Australian 4 Day Enduro (A4DE); 2011 Hattah Desert Race; 2011 Australian 4 Day Enduro (A4DE); 2012 Australian Off-Road Championship (AORC); 2012 Finke Desert Race; 2012 Hattah Desert Race; 2014 Finke Desert Race; 2014 Hattah Desert Race; 2014 Australian Off-Road Championship (AORC); 2015 Finke Desert Race; 2015 Hattah Desert Race; 2015 Australian Off-Road Championship (AORC); 2016 Finke Desert Race; 2018 Finke Desert Race; 2021 Finke Desert Race (Cars); 2022 Finke Desert Race (Cars); 2023 Finke Desert Race (Cars); 2026 Sunraysia Safari

Toby Joseph Price is an Australian off-road and enduro motorcycle racing world champion. He lives in Gold Coast, Queensland, and rode for the KTM Off-Road Racing Team until October 2015, then the Red Bull Factory KTM Rally Team until 2024.

Price is a two-time winner of the Dakar Rally, taking out the Bikes class in 2016 and 2019.

== Amateur career ==
Raised in a family that loves motorsports, Price started riding motorbikes at the age of two and started winning races at four. His father, John Price, is a former off-road buggy Australian champion. As a junior, living in Roto and then Hillston, Price frequently won New South Wales and Australian junior titles from around 1994 to 2003.

In 2003, Price won both of the two top divisions in the Australian Junior Motocross Championships, the 15 Years 125cc class and the 13–16 years 250cc 4-stroke, 12 weeks after breaking both wrists in a training accident.

== Professional career ==
=== 2004–2008 ===
Price began his professional career in Australia in 2004, aged 16. After winning two Australian junior titles in 2003, he was signed by Kawasaki Australia and then moved from Hillston to Singleton. Injuries kept him from competing for much of this time.

=== 2009 ===
Riding for Kawasaki, Price won the Australian Off-Road Championship in his first year of competition. He was awarded the Australian Dirt Bike magazine Rookie of the Year title.

Chosen to ride for Australia in the 2009 Enduro in Portugal, Price was the fastest under-23 years rider and was 14th in the world.

=== 2010 ===
Riding for KTM, Price won most of the major Australian Off-Road titles of 2010: AORC, Finke (on first attempt), Hattah (on first attempt), A4DE.

=== 2011 ===
Except for a fuel mishap in round one of the 2011 AORC, and a mechanical failure in the Finke Desert Race, Price again won most of the major off-road races in Australia. He won rounds 2, 3 and 4 of the AORC, Hattah and the A4DE. A mid-season injury put him out of the AORC title chase, leaving him in ninth place overall.

Selected for the Australian team to compete in the 2011 International Six Days Enduro (ISDE) competition in Finland from 8 to 13 August, Price finished fourth in the E2 class of the ISDE and eighth overall, making him the highest finishing Australian.

=== 2012 ===
Price took first place Pro Class Melbourne Enduro-X and won the Finke Desert Race and Hattah Desert Race He also won AORC, the first time it had been won from the E3 class, winning eight of the ten rounds, and finishing second in the other two.

Price was selected for the Australian team to compete in the 2012 International Six Days Enduro competition in Germany from 24 to 29 September, leading the Australian team to second place in the world. After the first couple of days, Price was leading the E3 class and was fifth overall, despite a bent front wheel from the first day. Near the halfway mark of the event, he suffered broken ribs in an incident. He continued despite the injuries, finishing second in the E3 class and tenth overall.

Two weeks after returning from the ISDE, Price won the E3 class in the A4DE, coming second overall, still riding with broken ribs.

=== 2013 ===
Riding for KTM, Price won rounds 2, 3 and 4 of the AORC, leading the E3 class and Outright.

While in California riding for KTM America in the AMA Hare and Hound National Championship in April, Price was involved in a crash, breaking three bones in his neck, and his thumb. After a major operation to repair his neck, Price was unable to ride until September. Following intensive rehabilitation, he returned to America and joined the KTM America team (though not riding) for the November Baja 1000 in which his teammate Kurt Caselli was killed.

Price's first major race after the broken neck was the December Red Bull Day In The Dirt in California, where he came second.

=== 2014 ===
Price won round 1 of the AORC, but suffered a crash that put him out of round 2. Less than a month later, still suffering the effects of the crash, he came second in rounds 3 and 4. He placed first in rounds 5, 6, 9, 10 and 11, becoming the only rider to win the AORC four times.

In June, Price won the Finke Desert race for the third time, followed by the Hattah Desert Race again in July.

Price won all three rounds of the Western Australian Desert Tri-Series, the Kumarina 500 in June, Doorawarrah 500 in July and Indee 500 in August.

Trying International Cross-country Rallying for the first time, Price showed his versatility by gaining eighth place in the Morocco Rally.

In November, Price won the E3 class at the International Six Days Enduro (ISDE) in Argentina, coming second overall by 45 seconds, after six days' racing.

Returning to California for the Red Bull Day In The Dirt, Price took out first place for 2014.

=== 2015 ===
In his debut attempt at the Dakar Rally, Price achieved a win in Stage 12, and finished in third place overall.

Price was a guest driver at the Clipsal 500 Stadium Super Trucks race at Adelaide Street Circuit. He competed in two of the three races, finishing sixth and eighth.

Several days before the 2015 Finke Desert Race, a large stick penetrated Price's boot while practising, breaking his right ankle and foot. He continued, and qualified first in the prologue, then won both days of the race, taking out his fourth Finke title.

Price won his fifth Hattah Desert Race title in July, coinciding with signing to replace the retiring Marc Coma on the Factory KTM Red Bull Rally team in the World Rally Championship and Dakar Rally

Price then took out a record fifth AORC win, wrapping up the title with two rounds still remaining.

=== 2016 ===
In January, Price dominated the Dakar Rally, winning Stages 2,5,6,8 and 9, winning overall by about 40 minutes, and becoming the first Australian to ever win any class of the Dakar Rally, as well as the only person to ever win on the second attempt and the first non-European to win the Bikes category.

Price followed this up in April by becoming the first Australian ever to win the Abu Dhabi Desert Challenge, putting him in the lead of the 2016 World Championship.

Price returned to Australia for the 2016 Finke Desert Race, competing in both Cars and Bikes, flying back along the track by aircraft after completing the Car leg each day, then riding the Bike leg. He came second in the Cars, then won the Bikes for a record-equalling fifth time.

In October, Price returned to Europe, winning the OiLibya Rally in Morocco, and taking third place overall in the 2016 World Championship.

=== 2017 ===
Price started his 2017 season with the Dakar once again, however he crashed out of the race while leading in Stage 4, having won Stage 2. He was later diagnosed with a broken left femur.

Eight weeks after breaking his femur, Price was back in the driver's seat at the Adelaide Clipsal 500 in the Stadium Super Trucks. He came fourth in Race 1 and second in Race 2.

Price was unable to race in the bikes section of the 2017 Finke Desert Race on doctor's orders, but was able to compete in the buggies. Starting from seventh on the grid in dusty conditions, Price was in third place 80 km from the finish when his car broke down with an engine sensor failure.

=== 2018 ===
Price's first motorcycle race since breaking his femur was the 2018 Dakar Rally in January. He rode consistently for the first 9 stages, but was in a group of riders who took a wrong turn in Stage 10, losing about 50 minutes. He then won Stages 11 and 13, coming third overall by 23 minutes.

In March, he returned to the Adelaide 500, driving in both the Stadium Super Trucks and the new SuperUtes Series. He came second overall in the inaugural round of the SuperUtes. Price had troubles in the first two rounds of the Stadium Super Trucks, but finished Race 3 in third place.

Price then raced in the Abu Dhabi Desert Challenge, winning the first stage. Price finished seventh overall, after a big crash in Stage 2, and stopping to assist fellow rider Mohammed Balooshi who was unconscious after a crash in Stage 3.

Price returned to Australia for the 2018 Finke Desert Race, again attempting the Iron Man Double (Car and Bike titles). After Day 1, he was coming second in the Cars, but had a power steering pump failure and did not complete the return leg. He led the Bikes all the way on both days, despite a hard fall around the 100 km mark on Day 2. He finished over ten minutes ahead of his nearest rival, taking out a record sixth Bikes title.

In August, Price came second in the 2018 Atacama Rally in Chile, then second by 6 seconds in the Desafío Ruta 40 in Tucumán, Argentina.

Price won the final round of the FIM Cross-Country Rallies World Championship, the Rallye OiLibya du Maroc, in October, becoming 2018 FIM World Rally Champion. He was the first Australian to ever achieve this title.

=== 2019 ===
Riding with a broken wrist, Price won the 2019 Dakar Rally. He was awarded the inaugural Ronald J Walker Award for Excellence by the Australian Motor Sport Hall of Fame in March.

In October, Price returned to the Stadium Super Trucks for the Gold Coast 600 weekend. Although he did not have a qualifying time when his No. 87 truck began experiencing oil pressure problems, he set the fastest unofficial time when he briefly drove Robby Gordon's No. 7 truck. In the first race of the weekend, Price started on the pole and led every lap until he was turned by Matthew Brabham in turn 11 on the final lap, dropping him to sixth. He finished the second race in fifth.

Price also raced in the Baja 1000 along with Nasser Al-Attiyah coming in second place.

=== 2020 ===
Price came third in the 2020 Dakar Rally, winning Stages 1 and 5. In Stage 7, he was first on scene and stopped for an hour and 20 minutes to try to assist Paulo Gonçalves, who was later pronounced dead from injuries sustained in the crash. Stage 8 of the rally was cancelled for the motorbikes and quads following the death of Paulo.

In February, Price returned to the Stadium Super Trucks at Adelaide, racing under the Team Australia banner in a crossover race between SST and the newly-formed Australian Boost Mobile Super Trucks.

=== 2021 ===
Price won Stages 1 and 3 of the 2021 Dakar Rally, and rode all Stage 8 with a severely damaged rear tyre that he repaired with duct tape and cable ties. He was less than a minute from the overall lead in Stage 9 when he crashed, injuring his left arm and shoulder and had to be airlifted to hospital, putting him out of the race.

On Australia Day 2021, Price was awarded a Medal of the Order of Australia, for service to motorsport, particularly to cross country motorcycle racing.

In June, Price became the first person to win the Finke Desert Race both in a car and on a bike, when he won the Cars category. Four days before Finke, he re-signed with KTM Factory Racing for another two years, and received doctor's clearance to ride motorcycles again following his Dakar shoulder injury.

Price returned to the Boost Mobile Super Trucks in July at Reid Park Street Circuit. He won his first career SST race in the first event after taking the lead following the competition caution.

=== 2022 ===
Price came tenth in the 2022 Dakar Rally, winning Stage 10.

Price's autobiography, Endurance: The Toby Price Story was released in late January.

Returning to the Finke Desert Race in June, Price won the Cars category for the second time, setting a record time of 1:36:38 from Alice Springs to Finke, and an overall race record of 3:21:46. This gave Price his eighth King of the Desert title and he remains the only competitor to have won on both two wheels and four.

=== 2023 ===
Price came second in the 2023 Dakar Rally, after winning the Prologue. He was 43 seconds behind teammate Kevin Benavides after two weeks of racing.

In June, Price won the Finke Desert Race for the ninth time, taking out the cars category for the third consecutive year.

Price won the Rallye du Maroc in October, giving him overall second place in the 2023 World Rally-Raid Championship, four points behind Luciano Benavides.

=== 2024 ===
Price won the 2024 Baja 500 in a SCORE Trophy Truck, with a time of 9 hours, 19 minutes, 55 seconds.

== Sponsorships ==
- Toyota Gazoo Racing W2RC
- Red Bull
- Black Rock Motor Resort
- ROH Wheels
- Can-Am
- ARB 4x4 Accessories
- Peter Kittle Motor Company
- Oakley, Inc.
- MoTeC
- Alpinestars
- PWR Advanced Cooling Technology
- Albek
- Vietnam Motorbike Tours
- KTM (2009–2024)
- Kawasaki motorcycles (2003–2009)

== Career results ==
=== Major titles ===
- 2009 Australian Off-Road Championship (AORC)
- 2010 Finke Desert Race
- 2010 Hattah Desert Race
- 2010 Australian 4 Day Enduro (A4DE)
- 2010 Australian Off-Road Championship (AORC)
- 2011 Hattah Desert Race
- 2011 Australian 4 Day Enduro (A4DE)
- 2012 Finke Desert Race
- 2012 Hattah Desert Race
- 2012 Australian Off-Road Championship (AORC)
- 2014 Finke Desert Race
- 2014 Hattah Desert Race
- 2014 Australian Off-Road Championship (AORC)
- 2014 International Six Days Enduro (ISDE) E3
- 2014 A Day in the Dirt Motocross Grand Prix
- 2015 Finke Desert Race
- 2015 Hattah Desert Race
- 2015 Australian Off-Road Championship (AORC)
- 2016 Dakar Rally
- 2016 Abu Dhabi Desert Challenge
- 2016 Finke Desert Race
- 2016 Rallye OiLibya du Maroc
- 2018 Finke Desert Race
- 2018 Rallye OiLibya du Maroc
- 2018 FIM Cross-Country Rallies World Championship
- 2019 Dakar Rally
- 2021 Finke Desert Race (Cars)
- 2022 Finke Desert Race (Cars)
- 2023 Finke Desert Race (Cars)
- 2023 Rallye du Maroc
- 2024 Baja 500
- 2026 Sunraysia Safari

=== Dakar Rally ===
Year	Class	Vehicle	Position	Stages won
2015	Motorbike	(Austria) KTM	**3rd**	1
2016	Motorbike	(Austria) KTM	**1st**	5
2017	Motorbike	(Austria) KTM	DNF	1
2018	Motorbike	(Austria) KTM	**3rd**	2
2019	Motorbike	(Austria) KTM	**1st**	1
2020	Motorbike	(Austria) KTM	**3rd**	2
2021	Motorbike	(Austria) KTM	DNF	2
2022	Motorbike	(Austria) KTM	**10th**	1
2023	Motorbike	(Austria) KTM	**2nd**	0
2024	Motorbike	(Austria) KTM	**5th**	0
2025	Car	(Japan) Toyota	DNF	0
2026	Car	(Japan) Toyota	**8th**	0

=== Stadium Super Trucks ===
(key) (Bold – Pole position. Italics – Fastest qualifier. * – Most laps led.)

Stadium Super Trucks results
Year	1	2	3	4	5	6	7	8	9	10	11	12	13	14	15	16	17	18	19	20	21	22	SSTC	Pts	Ref
2015	ADE; 6	ADE	ADE; 8	STP	STP	LBH	DET	DET	DET	AUS	TOR	TOR	OCF	OCF	OCF	SRF	SRF	SRF	SRF	SYD	LVV	LVV	26th	28	
2016	ADE; 12	**ADE**; 2*	ADE; 7	STP	STP	LBH	LBH	DET	DET	DET	TOW	TOW	TOW	TOR; 5	TOR; 4	CLT	CLT	OCF	OCF	SRF; 6	SRF; 4	SRF; 3	7th	150	
2017	ADE; 4	ADE; 2	ADE; 10	STP	STP	LBH	LBH	PER	PER	PER	DET	DET	TEX	TEX	HID	HID	HID	BEI	GLN	GLN	ELS	ELS	15th	66	
2018	ELS	ADE; 12	**ADE**; 10	ADE; 3	LBH	LBH	PER	PER	DET	DET	TEX	TEX	ROA	ROA	SMP	SMP	HLN	HLN	MXC	MXC			20th	40	
2019	COA	COA	TEX	TEX	LBH	LBH	TOR	TOR	MOH	MOH	MOH	MOH	ROA	ROA	ROA	POR	POR	**SRF**; 6*	SRF; 5				16th	34	

==== Boost Mobile Super Trucks ====
(key) (Bold – Pole position. Italics – Fastest qualifier. * – Most laps led.)

Boost Mobile Super Trucks results
Year	1	2	3	4	5	6	7	8	9	BMSTC	Pts	Ref
2020	ADE; 2	ADE; 5	ADE; 6							N/A^{1}	–	
2021	SYM	SYM	SYM	HID	HID	HID	TOW; 1	TOW; 2	TOW; 9	9th	27	

^{1} Standings were not recorded by the series for the 2020 season.

=== FIM Cross-Country Rallies and W2RC ===
- 2016 3rd place
- 2018 1st place
- 2023 2nd place

=== Awards ===
Price was awarded the Order of Australia Medal for service to motorsport in the 2021 Australia Day Honours List.

== Bibliography ==
- Flack, Darryl (30 August 2023). The Immortals of Australian Motorcycle Racing: The World Champs (Part of the 7-volume comprehensive sports collection). Immortals of Australian Sport (7-book series). Gelding Street Press. ISBN 978-0-6452070-5-7.

Sporting positions
Preceded by Marc Coma	Dakar Rally; Motorcycle Winner; 2016	Succeeded by Sam Sunderland
Preceded by Matthias Walkner	Dakar Rally; Motorcycle Winner; 2019	Succeeded by Ricky Brabec
