= Newcastle Street Circuit =

Supercar street circuit in Australia

- Street Circuit (2017–2019, 2023)
- Location: Newcastle
- Coordinates: 32°55′35.25″S 151°47′16.75″E
- FIA Grade: 3
- Opened: 24 November 2017; 8 years ago
- Closed: 12 March 2023; 3 years ago
- Major events: Supercars Championship Newcastle 500 (2017–2019, 2023)

Street Circuit (2017–2019, 2023)
- Length: 2.641 km (1.641 mi)
- Turns: 14
- Race lap record: 1:10.6403 ( (Australia) David Reynolds, Holden Commodore VF, 2017, Supercars)

The Newcastle Street Circuit was a temporary street circuit around the east end of Newcastle, New South Wales, Australia. The circuit hosted the Newcastle 500 round of the Supercars Championship in 2017, 2018, 2019 and 2023 with the 2020, 2021 and 2022 events cancelled due to the COVID-19 pandemic. The 14-turn, 2.641 km (1.641 mi) circuit takes in Newcastle Beach and the foreshore around Nobbys Beach Reserve. In 2023, Newcastle 500 failed to receive a contract extension for 2024; the council also voted to remove the permanent sections of racetrack.

== Circuit ==
=== Layout ===
The circuit began on Wharf Road, heading southwest towards the city. It then turned left at Watt Street, crossing over the Newcastle Light Rail tracks before ascending a 1:22 hill up Watt Street, before again turning left onto Shortland Esplanade 500 m (550 yd) after turn one. Once on Shortland Esplanade, the circuit snaked down the beachside road before reaching a 90° left turn at Zaara Street. This was followed by a 90° right turn onto Scott Street and another 90° left turn onto Parnell Place to the fastest stretch of circuit, Nobbys Road down past Fort Scratchley followed by a left-handed hairpin bend in the Camp Shortland carpark. From there a right-hand turn onto Wharf Road completed the lap.

The originally proposed layout featured a section through Pacific Park and a differently-profiled permanent course in Camp Shortland. In 2019, the Camp Shortland hairpin bend was altered to improve overtaking. The corner apex moved to where the outside track limit point was initially situated and the corner radius was tightened, giving drivers a longer and deeper braking zone to complete passes.

=== Construction ===
Works to prepare the precinct for racing began in July 2017, four months before the first event was held. Significant civil works were undertaken in Foreshore Park to create a pit area, as well as in Camp Shortland and on Nobbys' Road to make the streets suitable for racing. Additional works were undertaken to replace local water and electrical infrastructure, with some services close to a century old.

Two permanent roundabouts were removed to create the circuit, and were reinstalled when the track was decommissioned in 2024.

=== Criticism ===
The circuit attracted criticism from residents within the precinct, mainly citing concerns about noise and a lack of access. Some residents took an extremist view of the event, claiming it would encourage hoon behaviour and comparing themselves to victims of persecution. In March 2017, ahead of civil works to prepare the streets for racing, residents staged a protest resulting in clashes with motorsport fans.

Across March–April 2023, a non-binding survey was conducted by KPMG on the events' popularity with local residents; despite data being compromised due to residents' ability to submit multiple responses, a notionally negative-majority result led to Tim Crakanthorp, the state member for Newcastle, withdrawing his support for the event.

== Lap records ==
The fastest official race lap records at Newcastle Street Circuit are listed as:

Class	Time	Driver	Vehicle	Date
Street Circuit (2017–2019, 2023): 2.641 km (1.641 mi)
Supercars – Gen2	1:10.6403	(Australia) David Reynolds	Holden Commodore VF	26 November 2017
Supercars – Gen3	1:12.5355	(New Zealand) Shane van Gisbergen	Chevrolet Camaro ZL1	12 March 2023
Supercars – Project Blueprint	1:12.9790	(Australia) Brodie Kostecki	Ford Falcon FG	26 November 2017
Touring Car Masters	1:17.9460	(Australia) Steven Johnson	Ford Mustang Mk.1 Fastback	11 March 2023
Aussie Racing Cars	1:20.8036	(Australia) Kel Treseder	Chevrolet Camaro-Yamaha	24 November 2019
V8 Utes	1:24.5471	(Australia) Jeremy Gray	Ford Falcon FG Ute	26 November 2017
Toyota 86 Series	1:26.1035	(Australia) Declan Fraser	Toyota 86 GR Mk.1	24 November 2018
SuperUtes	1:29.1969	(New Zealand) Tom Alexander	Isuzu D-Max	23 November 2019
