= Holden Colorado =

Pickup truck from Holden

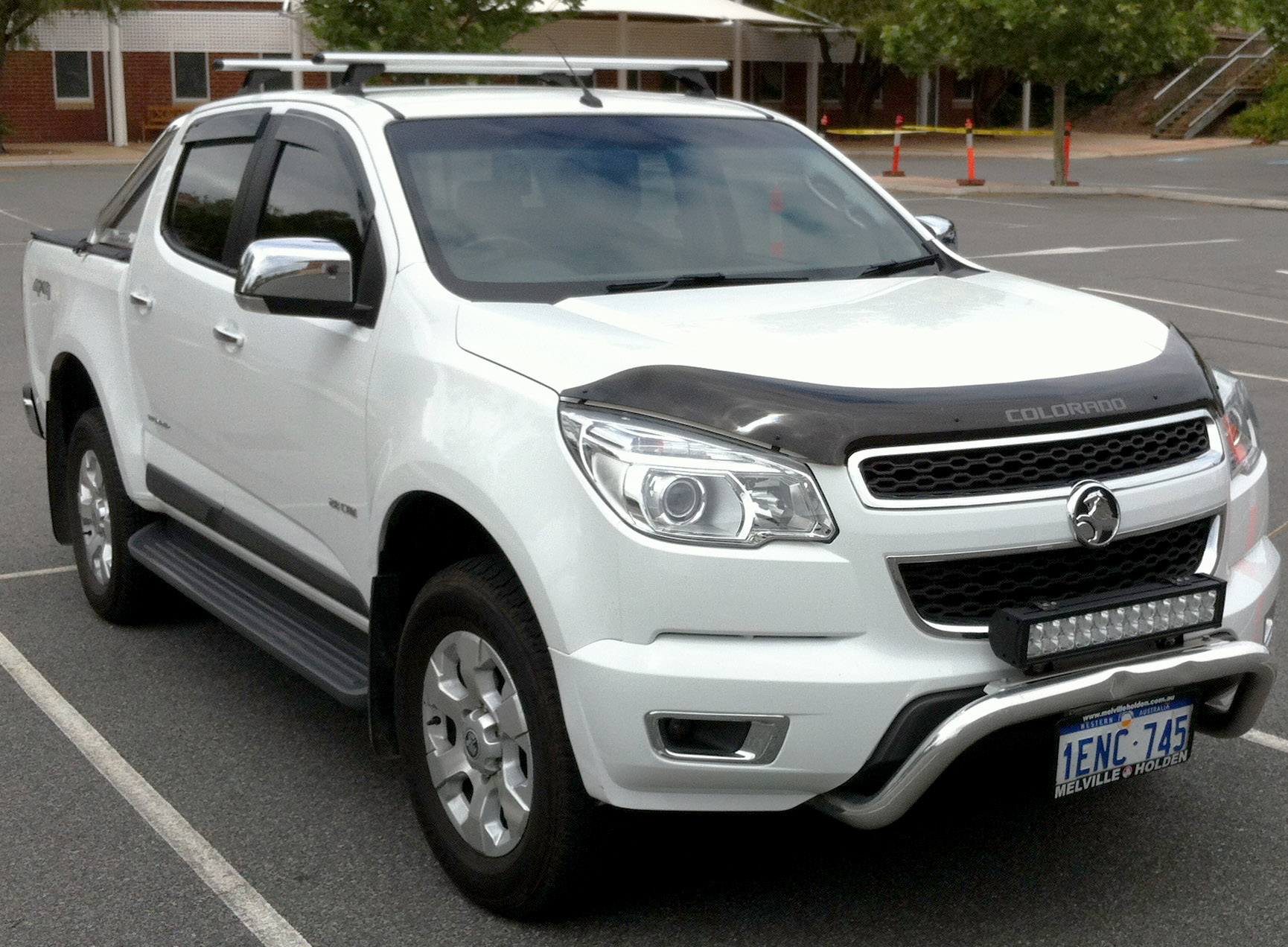
- 2014 Holden Colorado (RG MY15; pre-facelift)

Overview
- Manufacturer: Holden
- Also called: Chevrolet Colorado
- Production: 2008–2020
- Assembly: Thailand: Rayong (General Motors Thailand)

Body and chassis
- Class: Compact pickup truck (Mk1); Mid-size pickup truck (Mk2)
- Body style: 2-door pickup truck 4-door pickup truck
- Layout: Front-engine, rear-wheel-drive; Front-engine, four-wheel-drive
- Platform: GMT platform: GMT 355 (I); GMT 700 (II)
- Related: Isuzu D-Max

Dimensions
- Length: 4,900–5,020 mm (193–198 in) (Mk1); 5,347–5,461 mm (210.5–215.0 in) (Mk2)
- Width: 1,800–1,882 mm (70.9–74.1 in)
- Height: 1,730–1,800 mm (68–71 in)

Chronology
- Predecessor: Holden Rodeo; Holden Ute

The Holden Colorado is a range of 2- and 4-door, compact pickup trucks (mk1) and mid-size pickup trucks (mk2) that were produced for Australian manufacturer Holden, a subsidiary of General Motors from 2008 to 2021. Since its launch in 2008, it has been produced at the General Motors Thailand factory in Rayong, Thailand. This model is essentially a rebadged variant of the Chevrolet Colorado pickup truck, and replaces the previous Rodeo model, which is a rebadged variant of the Isuzu D-Max. The Colorado was made due to the split of GM and Isuzu.

== Colorado I (RC; 2008) ==
First generation (RC)
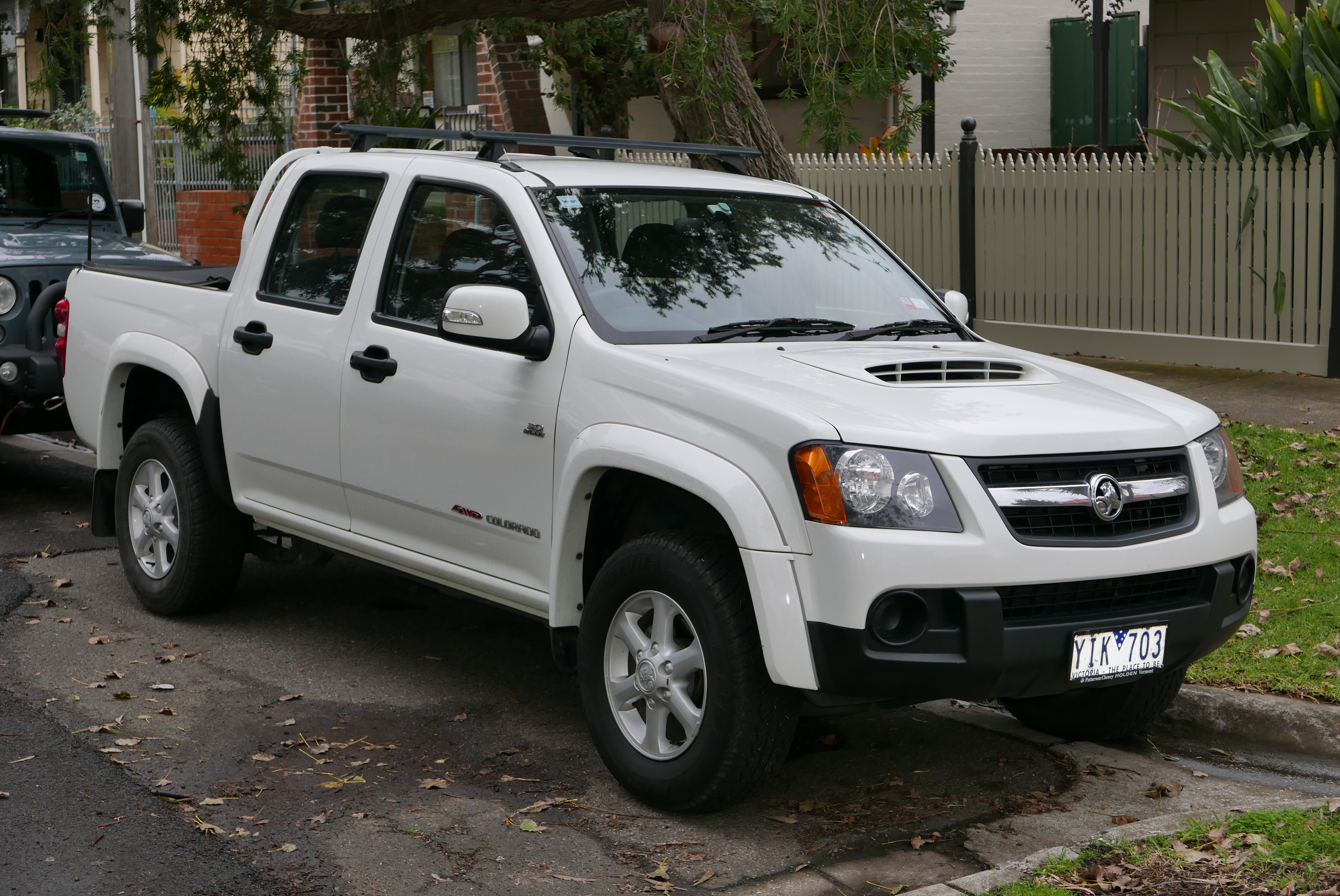

Overview
- Also called: Chevrolet Colorado (Thailand)
- Production: 2008 - 2012
- Assembly: Thailand: Rayong (General Motors Thailand)

Body and chassis
- Class: Compact pickup truck
- Platform: GMT 355
- Related: Isuzu D-Max (RA)

Powertrain
- Engine: Petrol: 2.4 L inline-four; 3.6 L Alloytec V6; Diesel: 3.0 L Isuzu 4JJ1-TCX turbocharged inline-four
- Transmission: 5-speed manual 4-speed automatic

The Colorado was released in Australia and New Zealand in 2008 as the Holden Colorado. It replaced the D-Max-based Holden Rodeo due to the split between General Motors and Isuzu. This model is essentially a rebadged version of the facelifted Thai-specification Colorado, retaining its front styling, while everything else is from the Isuzu D-Max. As with the Rodeo, the Colorado is available as either 4x2 or 4x4 and in a range of body styles, including single-cab, space-cab, and crew-cab. Power is provided by a range of petrol and diesel engines. Of the petrol engines, Holden offers a 2.4 four-cylinder or the Australian-made 3.6-liter Alloytec V6 engine. The diesel powerplant is the four-cylinder Isuzu 4JJ1-TCX unit displacing 3.0 liters. It was replaced by the second-generation Holden Colorado in 2012.

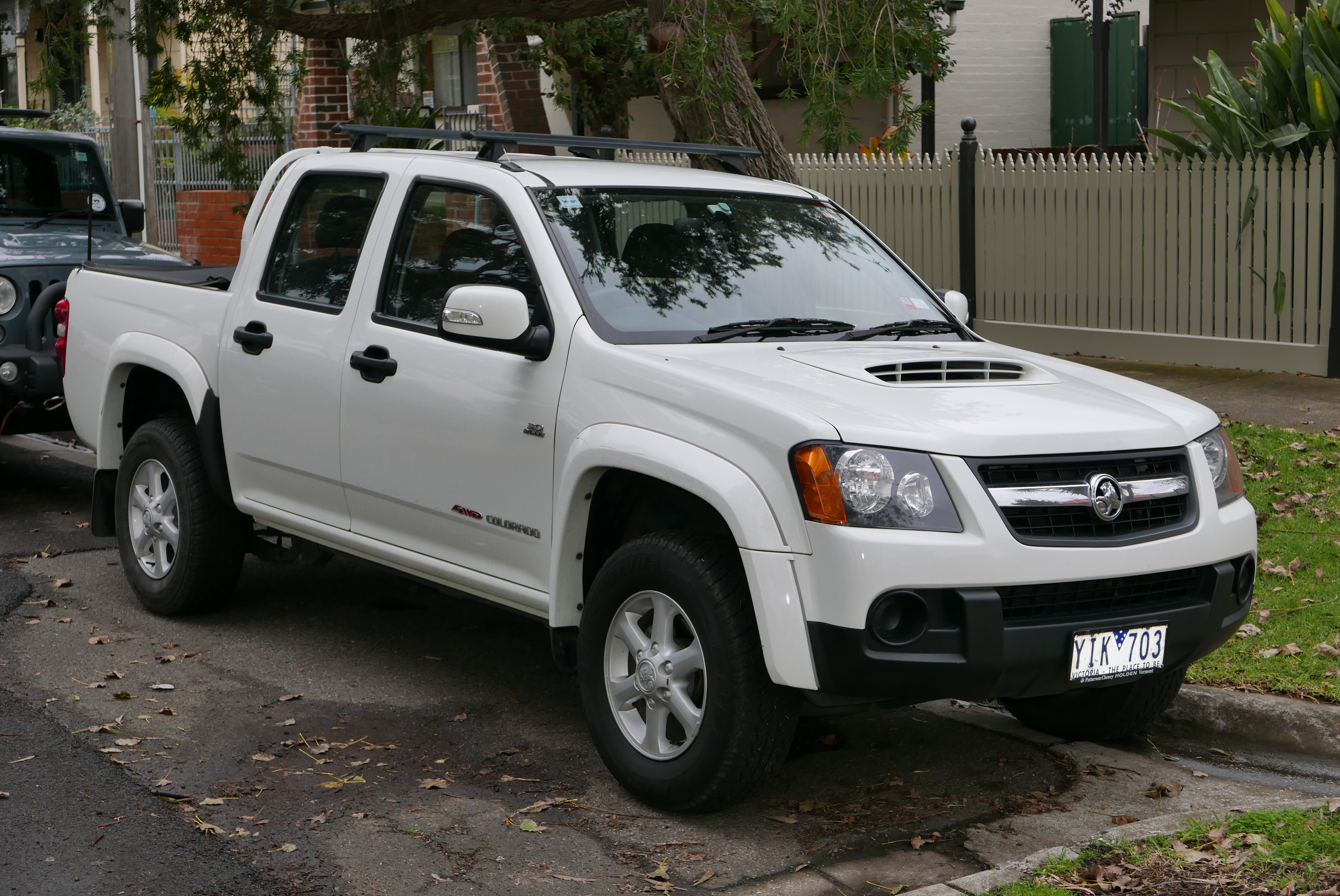
2011 Holden Colorado LX-R 4x4 Crew Cab (Australia)

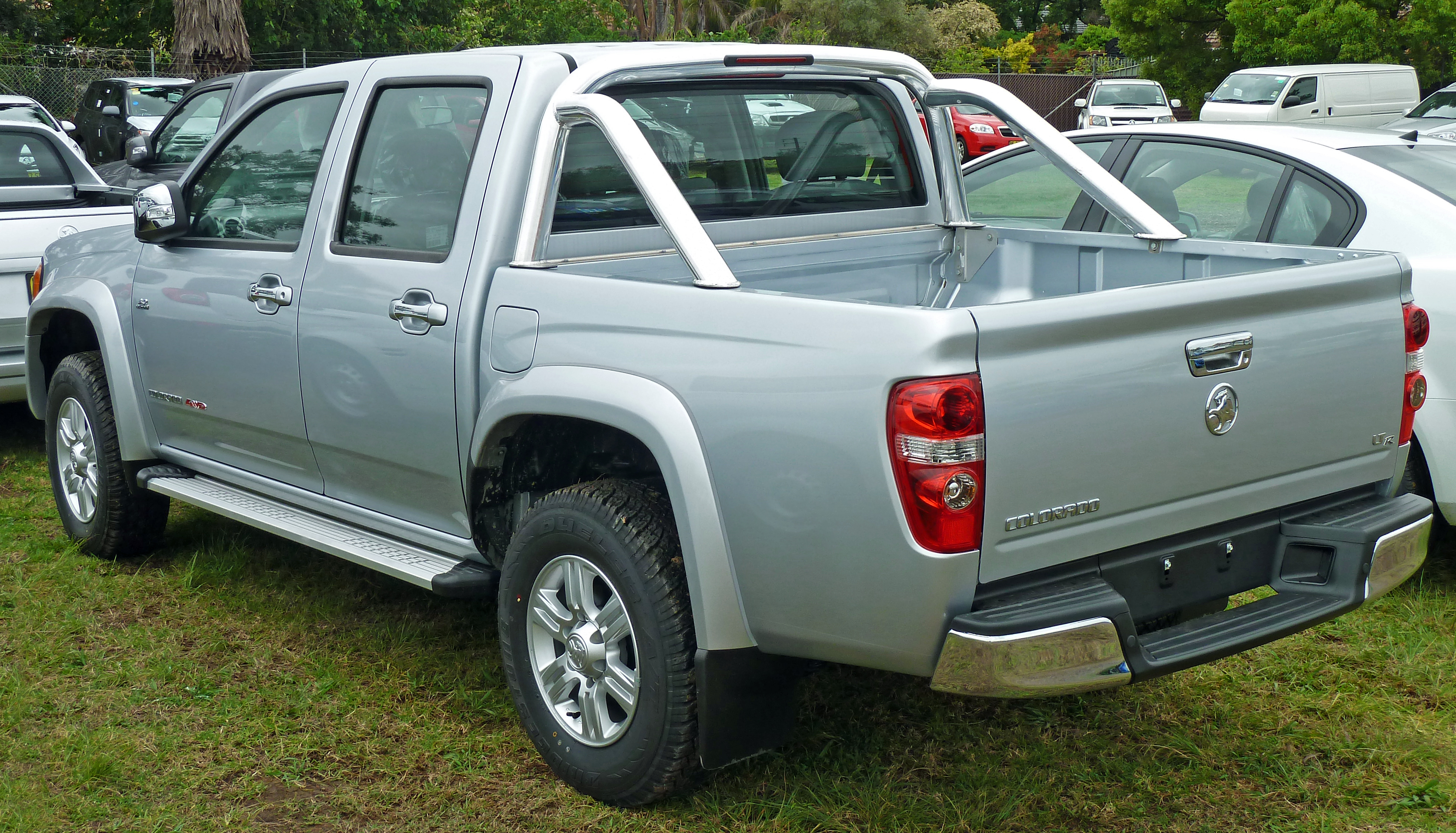
2010 Holden Colorado LT-R 4x4 Crew Cab (Australia)

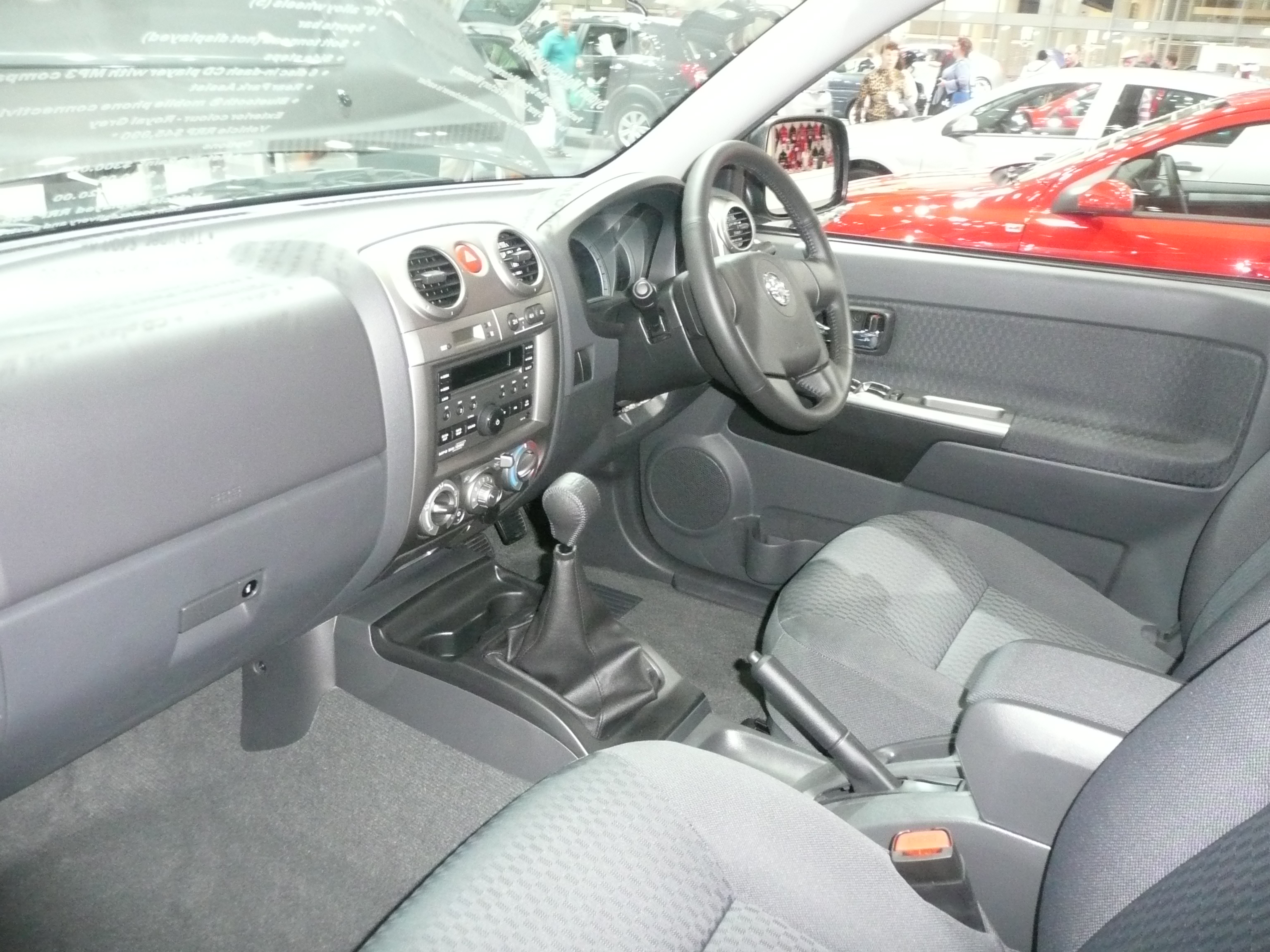
Interior

Holden Colorado powertrains
Engine	Power	Torque	Transmission
2.4 L inline-four	92 kW (123 hp)	207 N⋅m (153 lb⋅ft)	5-speed manual
3.6 L Alloytec V6	157 kW (211 hp)	313 N⋅m (231 lb⋅ft)	4-speed automatic 5-speed manual
3.0 L Isuzu 4JJ1-TCX (turbo-diesel)	120 kW (161 hp)	360 N⋅m (266 lbf⋅ft) (manual)	4-speed automatic 5-speed manual

== Colorado II (RG; 2012) ==
The second-generation Holden Colorado was revealed at the 2011 Australian International Motor Show and went on sale in June 2012 in both Australia and New Zealand, also sourced from the Rayong factory in Thailand. Only one engine is offered, the 2.8 L turbo diesel, built by GM Thailand. In order from lowest to highest, trims include the LS, LT, LSX, LTZ, LTZ+ and Z71 for the 2020 model year. The LS and LT are basic trims, LSX and Z71 are designed with a focus on off-roading, LTZ and LTZ+ are designed with a focus on luxury. LT is only available as a RWD, LSX, LTZ+ and Z71 are only available as 4WD.

For the 2016 model year, the Colorado was facelifted (RG II) with a retained front end, a Chevrolet-designed interior that replaces the Isuzu-designed interior, upgraded power, and better build quality.

The Brazilian-built Chevrolet S-10 dual-cab became the 2017 facelifted model. The Colorado and Colorado 7, the latter rebadged as Chevrolet Trailblazer SUV in 2017, were made at the GM Thailand plant for both the Asian and Australasian markets Both were discontinued in 2020 due to the demise of Holden brand and the closure of GM Thailand plant.

The pre-facelift model (LTZ) was criticized by CarAdvice (currently Drive.com.au) for its interior, ride, gearbox (automatic used in test), and build quality, but did receive praise for fuel consumption, practicality and servicing costs. CarAdvice did a review with the Isuzu D-Max (the truck the Colorado was based on), and said it was the better choice over the Holden.

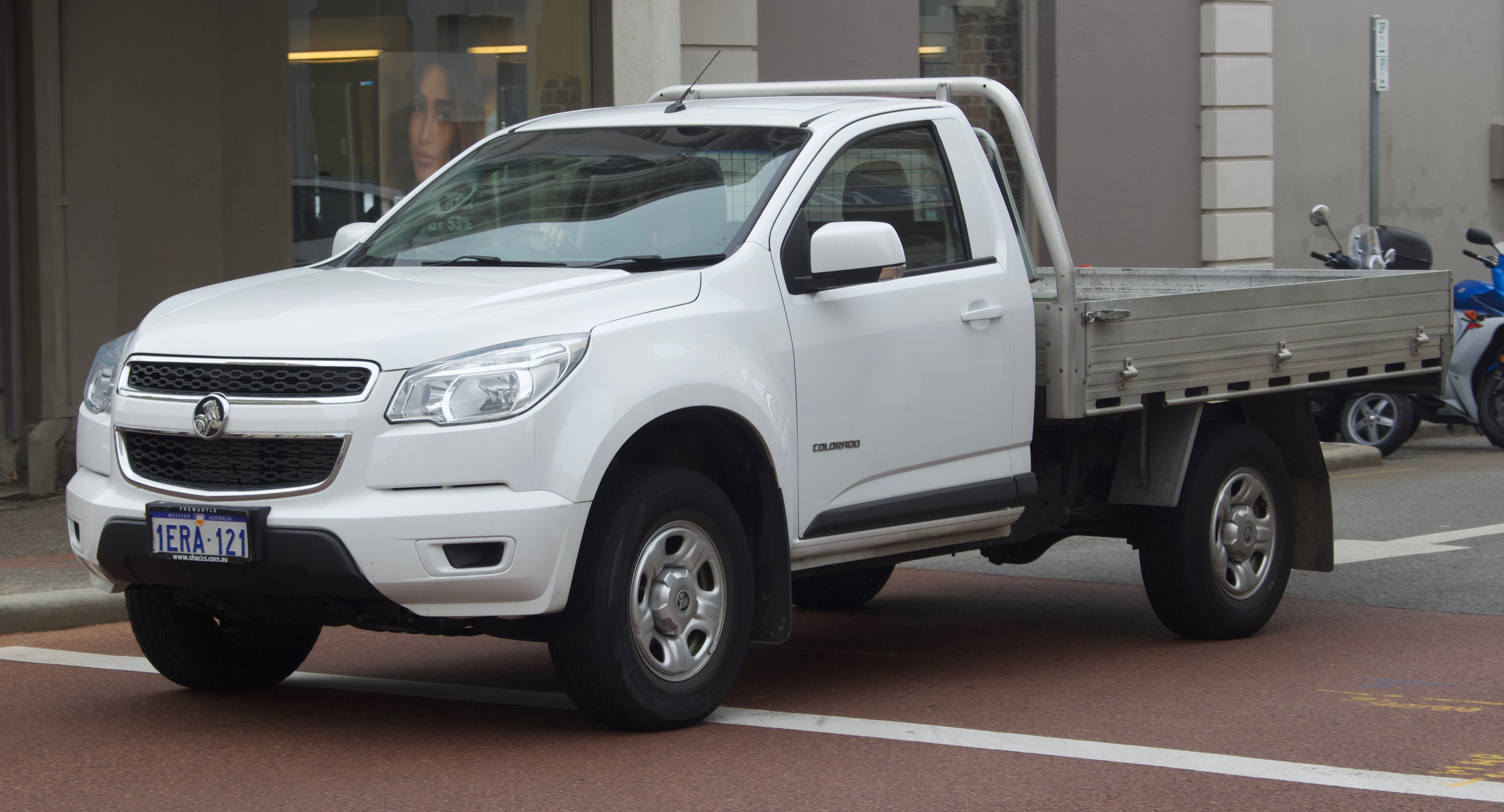
Cab chassis

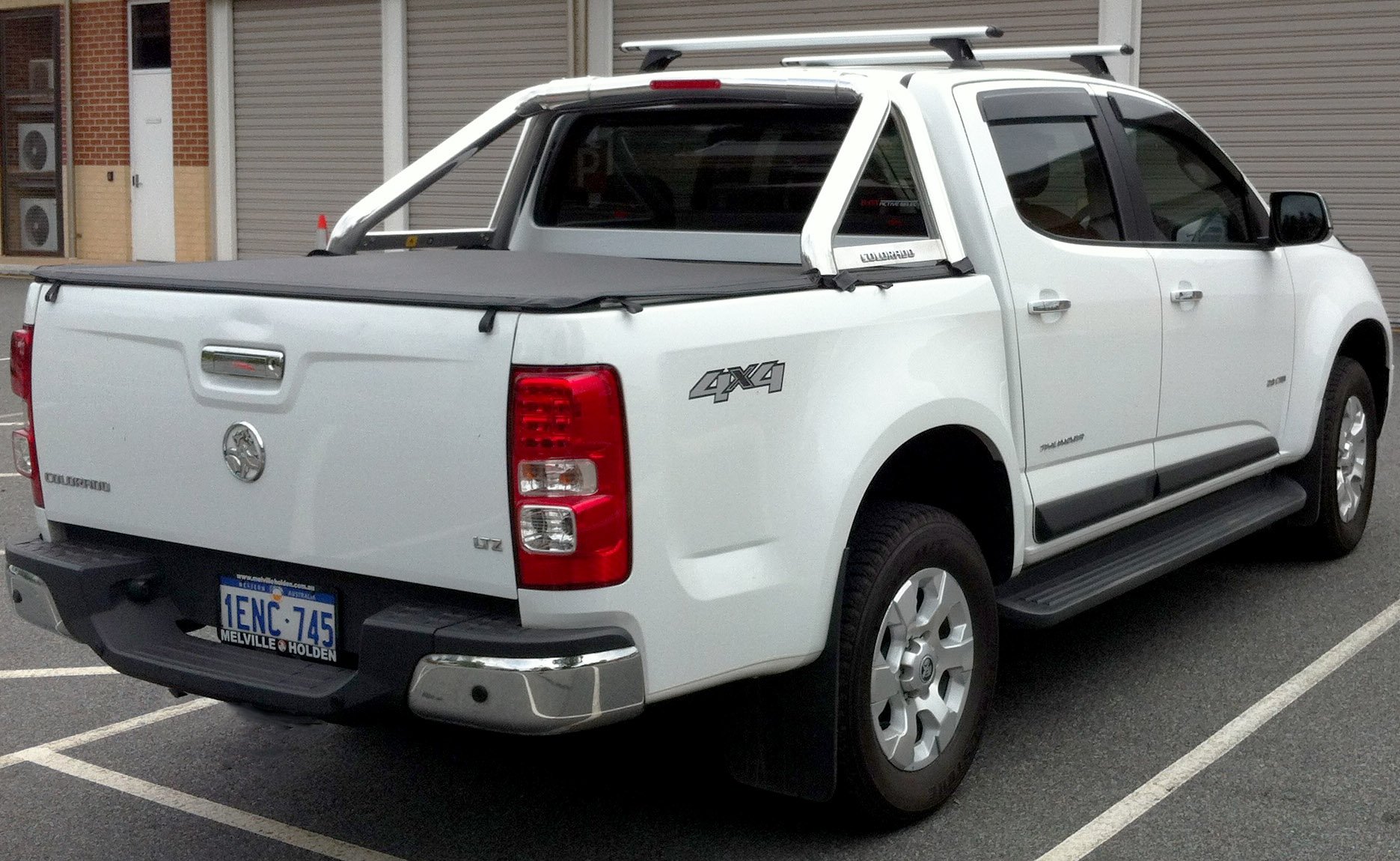
4-door utility (rear view; pre-facelift)

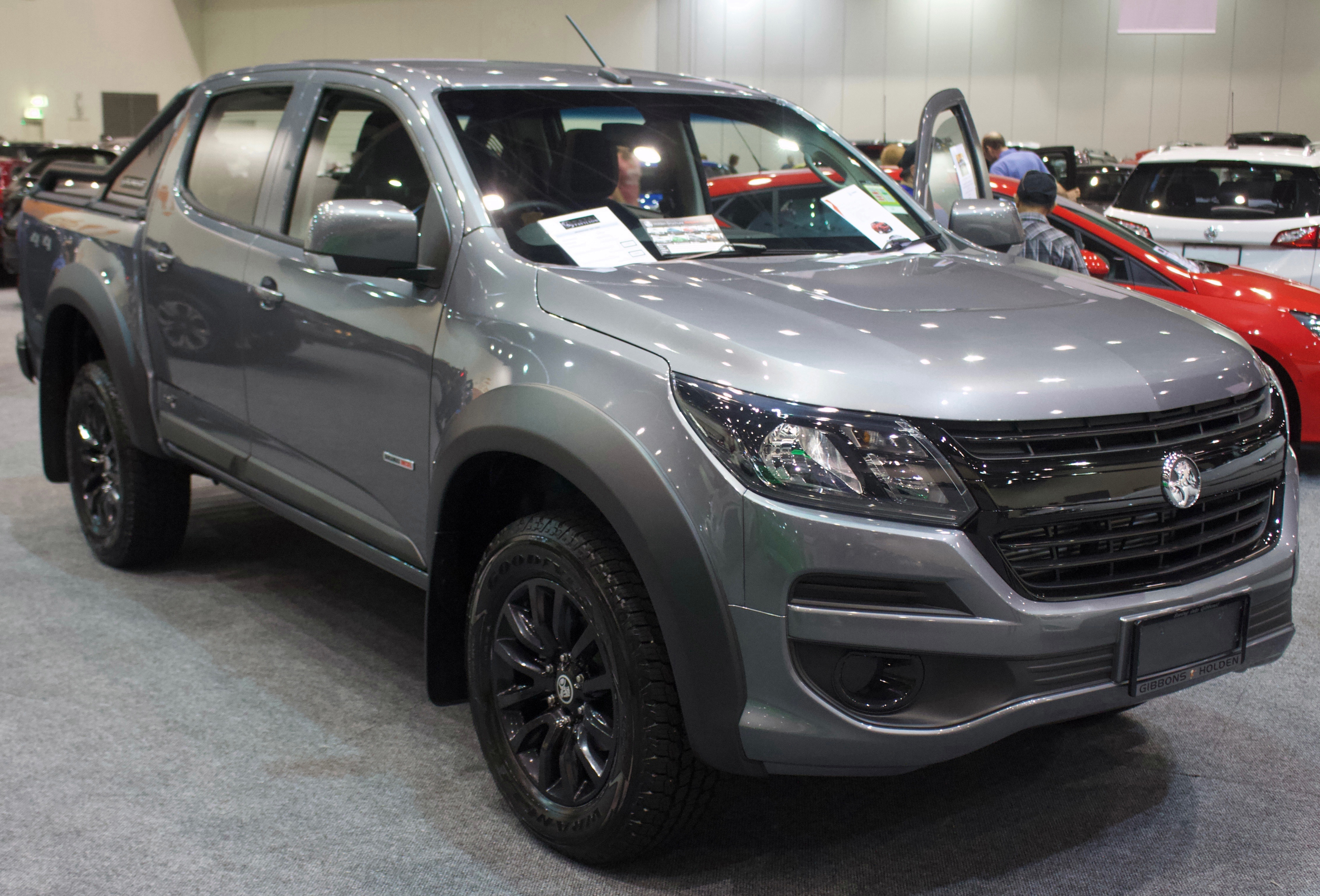
Second generation (RG; facelift, 2017-2020)

Engines
Model	Code	Engine	Power	Torque	Transmissions
2.8	Duramax	2,776 cc turbodiesel I4	197 hp (147 kW; 200 PS) @ 3,600 rpm	440 N⋅m (45 kg⋅m; 325 lb⋅ft) @ 2,000 rpm (manual); 500 N⋅m (51 kg⋅m; 369 lb⋅ft) @ 2,000 rpm (automatic)	6-speed manual 6-speed automatic (only with AWD)

== Safety ==
ANCAP test results* Holden Colorado LX 4x2 cab chassis (2008)
Test	Score
Overall	3 /5 stars
Frontal offset	7.51/16
Side impact	16/16
Pole	Not Assessed
Seat belt reminders	0/3
Whiplash protection	Not Assessed
Pedestrian protection	Not Assessed
Electronic stability control	Not Available

ANCAP test results* Holden Colorado LX 4x4 cab chassis (2008)
Test	Score
Overall	3 /5 stars
Frontal offset	5.40/16
Side impact	16/16
Pole	Not Assessed
Seat belt reminders	0/3
Whiplash protection	Not Assessed
Pedestrian protection	Poor
Electronic stability control	Not Available

ANCAP test results* Holden Colorado all single and space cab variants (2012)
Test	Score
Overall	4 /5 stars
Frontal offset	10.20/16
Side impact	16/16
Pole	2/2
Seat belt reminders	1/3
Whiplash protection	Not Assessed
Pedestrian protection	Adequate
Electronic stability control	Standard

ANCAP test results* Holden Colorado all variants (2012)
Test	Score
Overall	5 /5 stars
Frontal offset	15.09/16
Side impact	16/16
Pole	2/2
Seat belt reminders	2/3
Whiplash protection	Good
Pedestrian protection	Adequate
Electronic stability control	Standard

ANCAP test results* Holden Colorado all dual cab variants (2012)
Test	Score
Overall	5 /5 stars
Frontal offset	15.09/16
Side impact	16/16
Pole	2/2
Seat belt reminders	2/3
Whiplash protection	Good
Pedestrian protection	Adequate
Electronic stability control	Standard

ANCAP test results* Holden Colorado all variants (2016)
Test	Score
Overall	5 /5 stars
Frontal offset	13.89/16
Side impact	16/16
Pole	2/2
Seat belt reminders	3/3
Whiplash protection	Good
Pedestrian protection	Good
Electronic stability control	Standard

== See also ==
- Isuzu D-Max
- Chevrolet Colorado
- Holden Trailblazer
