= Sieders Racing Team =

- Manufacturer: V8:Ford
- Race Drivers: 8. David Sieders; V8 Utes; 9. Andrew Fisher; V8 Utes; 99. Ben Dunn; V8 Utes
- Chassis: V8:Ford BF Falcon; Utes:Ford Falcon Ute
- Debut: V8:2000; DVS:2000; Utes:2003
- Drivers' Championships: 3 (V8 Utes 2016, Toyota 86 Racing Series 2019, SuperUtes 2022)
- Round wins: 0
- Pole positions: 0
- 2009 position: 19th (85 pts)

Sieders Racing Team is a family-owned and -run Australian Touring Car, Sports Car and Truck Racing team that has competed in various Australian motor racing series. The team's primary operation is racing a V8 Supercar Ford Falcon in the second-tier series, the Fujitsu V8 Supercar Series.

== History ==
The team has run over the years cars and trucks for Bill, Luke, David and Colin Sieders in a variety of series, initially Truck racing in the late 1990s, branching briefly into V8 Supercar in the guise of All-Trans Racing with the assistance of the Garry Willmington Performance initially with Bill Sieders, Luke joined shortly afterwards as did fellow truck racer John Falk. The team returned several years later via Aussie Racing Cars and the short lived Lotus Trophy as David and Colin began their careers.

The team subsequently secured a wildcard entry for the 2009 L&H 500 and 2009 Supercheap Auto Bathurst 1000. After initially planning for Colin to co-drive with David, Colin stepped aside due to forthcoming surgery and V8 Utes series racer Andrew Fisher joined the team for the 2009 enduros. The team finished 20th and 2 laps down in the former and retired after 22 laps in the latter after the engine expired.

The team won the 2016 V8 Utes season and the 2022 SuperUtes Series season.

== Complete Bathurst 1000 results ==
Year	No.	Car	Drivers	Position	Laps
2000	42	Ford Falcon EL	(Australia) Bill Sieders (Australia) Luke Sieders	26th	137
2000	56	Ford Falcon EL	(Australia) Rob Russell (Australia) Steve Coulter	23rd	144
2009	13	Ford Falcon BF	(Australia) David Sieders (Australia) Andrew Fisher	DNF	22

== Super2 Drivers ==
- (Australia) Bill Sieders (2000)
- (Australia) John Falk (2000)
- (Australia) Luke Sieders (2000)
- (Australia) Colin Sieders (2006–2011)
- (Australia) David Sieders (2007–2009)
- (Australia) Hayden Pullen (2009)

== V8 Ute Drivers ==
- (Australia) David Sieders (2010–2013)
- (Australia) Andrew Fisher (2010)
- (Australia) Rohan Berry (2011)
- (Australia) Elliot Barbour (2013)
- (Australia) Charlie O'Brien (2013)
- (Australia) Graham Edwards (2013)

== SuperUte Drivers ==
- (Australia) David Sieders (2018, 2021)
- (Australia) Michael Sieders (2018–2019)
- (Australia) Craig Dontas (2018–2019, 2021–2022)
- (Australia) Toby Price (2018–2019)
- (Australia) Elliot Barbour (2018–2019)
- (Australia) Cameron Crick (2018–2019, 2021)
- (Australia) Aaren Russell (2018)
- (Australia) Luke van Herwaarde (2018–2019)
- (Australia) Matthew MacKelden (2018)
- (Australia) Jaiden Maggs (2019, 2021–2022)
- (Australia) Charlotte Poynting (2019)
- (Australia) Graham Edwards (2019)
- (Australia) Gerard Maggs (2019, 2021)
- (Australia) Jeff Watters (2019)
- (Australia) Josh Anderson (2019)
- (Australia) Layton Barker (2019, 2022)
- (Australia) Aaron Borg (2021–2022)
- (Australia) Wayne Williams (2021)
- (Australia) Richard Mork (2021)
- (Australia) Ellexandra Best (2021)
- (Australia) Harry Gray (2022)
- (Australia) Dave Casey (2022)
- (Australia) Rohan Berry (2022)
