= 2025 Australian National Trans Am Series =

Australian motor race competition

The 2025 Australian National Trans Am Series (commercially titled 2025 Trico National Trans Am Series) was a national motor racing series featuring conducted using TA2-class cars. The series was organised by Australian Racing Group and is one of two national racing series conducted using this car class; the other was the TA2 Racing Muscle Car Series. It was sanctioned by Motorsport Australia.

== Calendar ==
The series schedule has changed significantly with the SpeedSeries not running in 2025. The series ran as a support category at three Supercars Championship events, notably the Adelaide 500.

Also notable was a joint race with the other national TA2-based series, the TA2 Racing Muscle Car Series, at the Bathurst Six Hour, which category organisers hope to have a combined grid "in the vicinity of 40 cars".

Round	Event	Circuit	Dates	Supporting	Map
1	Hi-Tec Oils Race Tasmania	(Tasmania) Symmons Plains Raceway	22–23 March	Australian Prototype Series	2025 Australian National Trans Am Series is located in Australia
2	Hi-Tec Oils Bathurst 6 Hour	(New South Wales) Mount Panorama Circuit	18–20 April	Bathurst 6 Hour; TA2 Racing Muscle Car Series; Australian Prototype Series	2025 Australian National Trans Am Series is located in Australia
3	Betr Darwin Triple Crown	(Northern Territory) Hidden Valley Raceway	20–22 June	Supercars Championship; Porsche Carrera Cup Australia; Touring Car Masters	2025 Australian National Trans Am Series is located in Australia
4	GT Festival Sandown	(Victoria (state)) Sandown Raceway	25–27 July	GT World Challenge Australia; GT4 Australia Series; Aussie Racing Car Series; Radical Cup Australia	2025 Australian National Trans Am Series is located in Australia
5	The Bend 500	(South Australia) The Bend Motorsport Park	12–14 September	TCR World Tour; Supercars Championship; TCR Australia Touring Car Series; Porsche Carrera Cup Australia; Aussie Racing Car Series; Touring Car Masters	2025 Australian National Trans Am Series is located in Australia
6	Hi-Tec Oils Mallala Homecoming	(South Australia) Mallala Motorsport Park	21–22 November	Australian Formula Ford 1600 Nationals	2025 Australian National Trans Am Series is located in Australia
7	BP Adelaide Grand Final	(South Australia) Adelaide Street Circuit	27–30 November	Supercars Championship; Porsche Carrera Cup Australia; Aussie Racing Car Series; Super2 Series	2025 Australian National Trans Am Series is located in Australia

== Entry list ==
Manufacturer	Car	Team	No.	Driver	Class	Rounds
Chevrolet	Camaro	TFH Racing	12	(Australia) Mark Bailey	PA	1–4
Chevrolet	Camaro	Jason Pryde Motorsport	14	(Australia) Jason Pryde	PA	1–2
Chevrolet	Camaro	Tefol Racing	44	(Australia) Nick Lange		5, 7
Chevrolet	Camaro	Marcos Ambrose Motorsport	45	(Australia) Aaron Love		3–5
Chevrolet	Camaro	IES Motorsport	38	(Australia) Tyler Cheney		7
Chevrolet	Camaro	IES Motorsport	50	(Australia) Paul Hadley	PA	2
Chevrolet	Camaro	IES Motorsport	51	(Australia) Graham Cheney	PA	1–2
Chevrolet	Camaro	IES Motorsport	118	(Australia) Jarrod Hughes		1–2
Chevrolet	Camaro	STR Tribridge Holdings	54	(Australia) Brett Niall	PA	2
Chevrolet	Camaro	Hi-Tec Oils Racing	70	(Australia) Robbie Farr	PA	1–2
Chevrolet	Camaro	C & H Trucking	71	(Australia) Domain Ramsay	PA	All
Chevrolet	Camaro	Pioneer DJ	75	(Australia) Eliott Barbour		All
Chevrolet	Camaro	NEXTGEN Crushing and Screens	76	(Australia) Clint Rayner		7
Chevrolet	Camaro	Holinger Racing	77	(Australia) Chase Hoy		All
Chevrolet	Camaro	KRT Motorsport	121	(Australia) Kiara Zabetakis	PA	2
Chevrolet	Camaro	Six80 Racing	150	(Australia) Alice Buckley		5–7
Chevrolet	Camaro	Dream Racing Australia	777	(Australia) Craig Scutella	PA	2
Dodge	Challenger	Team RSG	81	(Australia) Hayden Jackson	PA	2
Ford	Mustang	TFH Racing	1	(Australia) Todd Hazelwood		All
Ford	Mustang	TFH Racing	16	(Australia) Tommy Smith		6–7
Ford	Mustang	TFH Racing	18	(Australia) Diesel Thomas	PA	2, 5, 7
Ford	Mustang	TFH Racing	18	(Australia) Josh Thomas		6
Ford	Mustang	TFH Racing	35	(Australia) Ben Gomersall		1–2, 5
Ford	Mustang	TFH Racing	63	(Australia) Des Collier	PA	1–5, 7
Ford	Mustang	TFH Racing	69	(Australia) Josh Thomas		1–5, 7
Ford	Mustang	TFH Racing	111	(Australia) Jack Smith		1–4, 6–7
Ford	Mustang	TFH Racing	111	(Australia) Tommy Smith		5
Ford	Mustang	Garwood Motorsport	2	(Australia) Adam Garwood		All
Ford	Mustang	All American Drivelines	03	(Australia) Ben Grice		1–5, 7
Ford	Mustang	Crutcher Developments	4	(Australia) Mark Crutcher	PA	1–2
Ford	Mustang	The Race Academy	5	(Australia) Blake Tracey		All
Ford	Mustang	The Race Academy	9	(Australia) Cameron Laws	PA	All
Ford	Mustang	The Race Academy	13	(Australia) Cody Maynes-Rutty		4–5, 7
Ford	Mustang	The Race Academy	19	(Australia) Tim Slade		3
Ford	Mustang	Dream Racing Australia	7	(Australia) Jackson Rice		1–3
Ford	Mustang	Garry Rogers Motorsport	8	(Australia) Lachlan Evennett		All
Ford	Mustang	Garry Rogers Motorsport	31	(Australia) James Golding		1–2, 4, 6
Ford	Mustang	Garry Rogers Motorsport	31	(Australia) Elliott Cleary		3
Ford	Mustang	Garry Rogers Motorsport	31	(Australia) Edan Thornburrow		7
Ford	Mustang	Garry Rogers Motorsport	33	(Australia) Jordan Cox		All
Ford	Mustang	Garry Rogers Motorsport	34	(Australia) James Moffat		All
Ford	Mustang	Garry Rogers Motorsport	38	(Australia) Elliott Cleary		4
Ford	Mustang	Garry Rogers Motorsport	42	(Australia) Tom Davies		All
Ford	Mustang	Turps Tippers	11	(Australia) Michael Coulter	PA	1–2
Ford	Mustang	Holinger Racing	23	(Australia) John Holinger	PA	All
Ford	Mustang	Holinger Racing	49	(Australia) Jordan Boys		3
Ford	Mustang	Nathan Herne Racing	29	(Australia) Nathan Herne		All
Ford	Mustang	Ashley Jarvis Racing	32	(New Zealand) Ayrton Hodson		2
Ford	Mustang	Blanchard Racing Team	36	(Australia) Tim Blanchard		3
Ford	Mustang	Herzog Steel	37	(Australia) Josh Haynes		1–3
Ford	Mustang	RPM Hire	44	(Australia) Clay Richards		4–5, 7
Ford	Mustang	Nemo Racing	55	(Australia) Charlie Nash		1–2
Ford	Mustang	Nemo Racing	67	(Australia) Nash Morris		1–3
Ford	Mustang	Nemo Racing	67	(Australia) Paul Morris		7
Ford	Mustang	Wadley Property Group	88	(Australia) Warren Wadley	PA	2
Ford	Mustang	Security of Supply Group	91	(New Zealand) Aaron Prosser	PA	2
Ford	Mustang	Bargwanna Motorsport	97	(Australia) Ben Bargwanna		All
Ford	Mustang	Marcos Ambrose Motorsport	200	(Australia) Joshua Webster		1–2

== Season summary ==
Rd	Race	Circuit	Pole position	Fastest lap	Winning driver	Winning team	Winning car
1	1	(Tasmania) Symmons Plains Raceway	(Australia) Todd Hazelwood	(Australia) Todd Hazelwood	(Australia) Todd Hazelwood	TFH Racing	Ford Mustang
1	2	(Tasmania) Symmons Plains Raceway		(Australia) Todd Hazelwood	(Australia) Todd Hazelwood	TFH Racing	Ford Mustang
1	3	(Tasmania) Symmons Plains Raceway		(Australia) Todd Hazelwood	(Australia) Todd Hazelwood	TFH Racing	Ford Mustang
1	4	(Tasmania) Symmons Plains Raceway		(Australia) Todd Hazelwood	(Australia) Todd Hazelwood	TFH Racing	Ford Mustang
2	1	(New South Wales) Mount Panorama Circuit	(Australia) James Golding	(Australia) Todd Hazelwood	(Australia) James Golding	Garry Rogers Motorsport	Ford Mustang
2	2	(New South Wales) Mount Panorama Circuit		(Australia) Todd Hazelwood	(Australia) Todd Hazelwood	TFH Racing	Ford Mustang
3	1	(Northern Territory) Hidden Valley Raceway	(Australia) Todd Hazelwood	(Australia) Todd Hazelwood	(Australia) Todd Hazelwood	TFH Racing	Ford Mustang
3	2	(Northern Territory) Hidden Valley Raceway		(Australia) Ben Bargwanna	(Australia) James Moffat	Garry Rogers Motorsport	Ford Mustang
3	3	(Northern Territory) Hidden Valley Raceway		(Australia) James Moffat	(Australia) James Moffat	Garry Rogers Motorsport	Ford Mustang
4	1	(Victoria (state)) Sandown Raceway	(Australia) James Golding	(Australia) James Golding	(Australia) James Golding	Garry Rogers Motorsport	Ford Mustang
4	2	(Victoria (state)) Sandown Raceway		(Australia) Todd Hazelwood	(Australia) Todd Hazelwood	TFH Racing	Ford Mustang
4	3	(Victoria (state)) Sandown Raceway		(Australia) Jack Smith	(Australia) James Golding	Garry Rogers Motorsport	Ford Mustang
5	1	(South Australia) The Bend Motorsport Park	(Australia) Todd Hazelwood	(Australia) Nathan Herne	(Australia) Blake Tracey	The Race Academy	Ford Mustang
5	2	(South Australia) The Bend Motorsport Park		(Australia) Blake Tracey	(Australia) Blake Tracey	The Race Academy	Ford Mustang
5	3	(South Australia) The Bend Motorsport Park		(Australia) Jordan Cox	(Australia) Blake Tracey	The Race Academy	Ford Mustang
6	1	(South Australia) Mallala Motor Sport Park	(Australia) Lachlan Evennett	(Australia) Blake Tracey	(Australia) Nathan Herne	Nathan Herne Racing	Ford Mustang
6	2	(South Australia) Mallala Motor Sport Park		(Australia) Blake Tracey	(Australia) Nathan Herne	Nathan Herne Racing	Ford Mustang
6	3	(South Australia) Mallala Motor Sport Park		(Australia) Nathan Herne	(Australia) James Golding	Garry Rogers Motorsport	Ford Mustang
7	1	(South Australia) Adelaide Street Circuit	(Australia) Todd Hazelwood	(Australia) Jordan Cox	(Australia) Todd Hazelwood	TFH Racing	Ford Mustang
7	2	(South Australia) Adelaide Street Circuit		(Australia) Jack Smith	(Australia) Todd Hazelwood	TFH Racing	Ford Mustang
7	3	(South Australia) Adelaide Street Circuit		(Australia) Todd Hazelwood	(Australia) Todd Hazelwood	TFH Racing	Ford Mustang

== Championship standings ==
Pos.	Driver	TAS				BAT		DAR			SAN			BEN			MAL			ADE			Pen	Points
1	(Australia) Todd Hazelwood	1	1	1	1	2	1	1	12	2	4	1	2	2	2	9	6	5	4	1	1	1		642
2	(Australia) Nathan Herne	2	6	5	25	3	2	4	2	3	9	Ret	4	3	3	3	1	1	2	6	Ret	5		509
3	(Australia) James Golding	4	2	14	24	1	4				1	2	1				3	2	1					346
4	(Australia) Blake Tracey	13	9	Ret	DNS	7	3	Ret	21	17	15	6	16	1	1	1	4	4	10	2	4	4		338
5	(Australia) James Moffat	26	10	4	13	16	11	3	1	1	Ret	7	6	Ret	10	7	2	3	3	5	Ret	Ret		333
6	(Australia) Jordan Cox	6	16	11	4	5	Ret	15	6	21	3	4	5	7	4	2	Ret	DNS	6	7	6	Ret		273
7	(Australia) Lachlan Evennett	5	7	6	Ret	12	Ret	16	16	10	7	10	21	6	12	5	Ret	9	5	3	2	2		268
8	(Australia) Elliot Barbour	12	20	26	8	4	6	Ret	10	8	6	Ret	14	17	7	10	7	8	8	4	3	6		260
9	(Australia) Adam Garwood	17	15	10	23	9	25	6	5	6	11	5	Ret	9	Ret	12	9	11	9	10	7	3		227
10	(Australia) Ben Grice	8	5	2	2	8	Ret	Ret	17	Ret	5	11	11	Ret	8	6				15	11	7		201
11	(Australia) Tom Davies	3	4	3	7	15	30	8	23	15	22	13	15	10	14	20	5	7	17	12	9	9		205
12	(Australia) Ben Bargwanna	16	11	9	5	10	5	13	7	7	8	Ret	7	16	11	21	13	16	12	11	8	12		190
13	(Australia) Aaron Love							9	4	12	2	3	3	8	9	4								190
14	(Australia) Jack Smith	11	8	7	18	11	27	7	18	16	13	8	8				10	10	7	9	26	23		161
15	(Australia) Chase Hoy	18	14	13	11	13	Ret	11	22	Ret	12	18	12	Ret	6	13	8	6	Ret	8	5	Ret		122
16	(Australia) Nash Morris	7	3	21	3	Ret	12	2	8	4														113
17	(Australia) Cody Maynes-Rutty										17	12	10	5	5	8				20	13	22		82
18	(Australia) Josh Thomas	20	Ret	19	17	17	9	12	11	9				10	15	18	12	12	16	Ret	21	17		80
19	(Australia) Tim Slade							5	3	5														74
20	(Australia) Jarrod Hughes	14	13	8	10	6	10																	63
21	(Australia) Josh Haynes	9	12	12	6	18	7	14	19	13														62
22	(Australia) Cameron Laws	Ret	19	Ret	26	29	21	Ret	15	9	18	Ret	22	12	18	16	11	13	11	21	17	15		58
23	(Australia) Jackson Rice	10	17	15	9	31	18	10	Ret	11														44
24	(Australia) Diesel Thomas					33	24				16	16	19	11	21	11				14	16	11		43
25	(Australia) John Holinger	25	23	17	14	20	13	Ret	Ret	Ret	20	19	20	13	17	17	16	Ret	15	23	22	18		43
26	(Australia) Domain Ramsay	21	21	25	22	30	16	20	13	Ret	19	15	Ret	18	Ret	Ret	15	15	14					34
27	(Australia) Elliott Cleary										10	9	9											34
28	(Australia) Des Collier	22	22	22	19	21	Ret	19	14	Ret	21	17	17	15	20	22				DSQ	23	19		31
29	(Australia) Clay Richards										14	Ret	13	DSQ	16	14				Ret	19	10		30
30	(Australia) Ben Gomersall	15	Ret	DNS	Ret	14	8							Ret	13	15								28
31	(Australia) Mark Bailey	19	18	Ret	12	22	DSQ	17	20	18	23	14	18											27
32	(Australia) Tim Blanchard							18	9	20														19
33	(Australia) Graham Cheney	Ret	26	18	15	25	15																	12
34	(Australia) Jason Pryde	23	24	24	Ret	27	17													24	25	21		10
35	(Australia) Michael Coulter	24	25	Ret	21	24	19																	7
36	(Australia) Josh Webster	Ret	28	23	Ret	23	14																	7
37	(Australia) Robbie Farr	Ret	27	16	20	Ret	28																	6
38	(Australia) Mark Crutcher	Ret	Ret	20	16	Ret	22																	5
39	(New Zealand) Ayrton Hodson					19	26																	5
40	(Australia) Brett Niall					26	20																	4
41	(Australia) Jordan Boys							Ret	Ret	14														4
42	(Australia) Paul Hadley					32	33																	3
43	(Australia) Craig Scutella					28	29																	3
44	(Australia) Hayden Jackson					Ret	23																	1
45	(New Zealand) Aaron Prosser					Ret	31																	1
46	(Australia) Kiara Zabetakis					DNS	32																	1
47	(Australia) Warren Wadley					Ret	DNS																	0
48	(Australia) Charlie Nash	27	Ret	DNS	DNS	Ret	Ret																-30	-29
Pos.	Driver	TAS				BAT		DAR			SAN			BEN			MAL			ADE			Pen	Points
