= 2025 Touring Car Masters =

The 2025 Touring Car Masters (known as the 2025 Duggan Family Hotels Touring Car Masters for promotional reasons) was an Australian racing series for modified Touring Cars.

The series was won by Joel Heinrich in a Chevrolet Camaro RS

== Calendar ==
Rd	Circuit	Location	Date	Supporting
1	(New South Wales) Sydney Motorsport Park	Eastern Creek, New South Wales	21–23 February	Supercars Championship; Super2 Series; SuperUtes Series; Porsche Carrera Cup Australia
2	(Tasmania) Symmons Plains Raceway	Launceston, Tasmania	9–11 May	Supercars Championship; Super2 Series; SuperUtes Series; Aussie Racing Car Series
3	(Northern Territory) Hidden Valley Raceway	Darwin, Northern Territory	20–22 June	Supercars Championship; Porsche Carrera Cup Australia; Australian National Trans Am Series; Combined Sedans
4	(South Australia) The Bend Motorsport Park	Tailem Bend, South Australia	12–14 September	Supercars Championship; TCR World Tour; Porsche Carrera Cup Australia; Aussie Racing Car Series; Australian National Trans Am Series
5	(New South Wales) Mount Panorama Circuit	Bathurst, New South Wales	9–12 October	Supercars Championshipp; Super2 Series; SuperUtes Series; Porsche Carrera Cup Australia; GR Cup
6	(Victoria (state)) Sandown Raceway	Springvale, Victoria	14–16 November	Supercars Championship; SuperUtes Series; Porsche Sprint Challenge Australia; GR Cup

== Entries ==
Manufacturer	Model	Entrant	No.	Driver	Class	Rounds
Chevrolet	Camaro RS	Whiteline Racing	95	(Australia) Joel Heinrich	PM	1–3
Chevrolet	Camaro SS	Whiteline Racing	85	(Australia) Scott Cameron	PA	1–3
Chevrolet	Camaro SS	Rob Lewis Racing	70	(New Zealand) Rob Lewis	INV	5–6
Chevrolet	Camaro SS	Akatrax Bike Park	81	(New Zealand) Hamish Frew	INV	5–6
Chevrolet	Camaro SS	Greg Donaldson Contracting	477	(New Zealand) Greg Donaldson	INV	5
Chevrolet	Camaro SS	NLS/AJA Racing	96	(Australia) Aldo Pi Paoli		2
Chevrolet	Camaro SS	Tristan Teki Racing	127	(New Zealand) Tristan Teki	INV	5–6
Chevrolet	Monza	Benn Dunn Racing	8	(Australia) Ben Dunn		1
Chevrolet	Monza	Mike Wallace Racing	151	(New Zealand) Mike Wallace	INV	5–6
Chrysler	Valiant Pacer	Anglomoil Super Lubricants	60	(Australia) Cameron Tilley	PA	1–3
Chrysler	VH Valiant Charger	Wasn't Me Racing	143	(New Zealand) Tony Galbraith	INV	5–6
Ford	Capri Perana	Maverick Performance	1	(Australia) Adam Garwood	PM	2, 5
Ford	XB Falcon	Keith Kassulke Racing	52	(Papua New Guinea) Keith Kassulke		5
Ford	XD Falcon	R&J Batteries Racing	71	(Australia) Marcus Zukanovic	PM	1, 5–6
Ford	XE Falcon	Dannevirke Honda	117	(New Zealand) Greg Cuttance	INV	5–6
Ford	XE Falcon	Total Transport Ltd	138	(New Zealand) Grant Rivers	INV	5
Ford	XE Falcon	Total Transport Ltd	138	(New Zealand) Adrian Rivers	INV	6
Ford	XY Falcon GTHO	Cannon Trailers	65	(Australia) Rod Cannon		1
Ford	XY Falcon GTHO	Cannon Trailers	65	(Australia) Michael Cannon		5–6
Ford	Mustang	ProLube	28	(Australia) Jamie Tilley		1
Ford	Mustang	Heywoods Shepparton Motor Panel	29	(Australia) Martin Riseley	PS	2–3, 5-6
Ford	Mustang Trans Am	Angus Fogg Racing	11	(New Zealand) Angus Fogg	INV	5–6
Ford	Mustang Trans Am	Hancock Racing	33	(Australia) Steven Johnson	PM	1–3 5-6
Ford	Mustang Trans Am	Pierce Plumbing	46	(Australia) Leo Tubin		3
Ford	Mustang Trans Am	TFS Third Party Logistics	88	(Australia) Tony Karanfilovski	PA	1–3
Holden	HQ Monaro	Mona Vale Smash Repairs	24	(Australia) Scott Fleming		5
Holden	HQ Monaro	Piggy Backers Rentals / Carboglass	51	(New Zealand) Gavin McLaughlin	INV	5
Holden	HQ Monaro	SNB Berryman Racing	77	(Australia) Warren Trewin	PS	5
Holden	HT Monaro	Paul Smith Earthmoving	129	(New Zealand) Bruce Tinnelly	INV	5
Holden	Commodore	Geoff Cowie Racing	10	(Australia) Geoff Cowie	INV	3
Holden	Commodore	David Ling Racing	14	(Australia) David Ling	INV	3
Holden	Commodore	Frankston Steel Supplies	26	(Australia) Ryan Robson	INV	3
Holden	Commodore	Eddie Austin Racing	30	(Australia) Eddie Austin	INV	3
Holden	Commodore	Glenco Developments	32	(Australia) Ian Roots	INV	3
Holden	Commodore	Gold Medal Services	35	(Australia) Shane Smith	INV	3
Holden	VB Commodore	Janine Wallace Racing	26	(New Zealand) Janine Wallace	INV	5
Holden	VB Commodore	Duggan Family Racing	58	(Australia) Jude Bargwanna	PM	1–3
Holden	VB Commodore	Duggan Family Racing	58	(Australia) Garnet Patterson	PM	5
Holden	VB Commodore	782Motors	782	(Australia) David Casey		5
Holden	Torana A9X	Western General Body Works	3	(Australia) Danny Buzadzic	PA	1–3
Holden	Torana A9X	Northside Taxis	4	(Australia) Allan Hughes		1
Holden	Torana A9X	Multispares Racing	6	(Australia) Ryan Hansford	PM	1–3
Holden	Torana A9X	Multispares Racing	27	(Australia) John Bowe		6
Holden	Torana A9X	MoCOMM Motorsport Comms	7	(Australia) Jim Policina		5
Holden	Torana A9X	Peter Burnitt Racing	12	(Australia) Peter Burnitt	PS	1, 3
Holden	Torana A9X	Sandra Eden Racing	16	(New Zealand) Sandra Eden	INV	5
Holden	Torana A9X	David Hender Racing	18	(Australia) David Hender	PS	1–3
Holden	Torana A9X	Team Bullfrog	78	(Australia) Jeremy Hassell	PS	1–3
Holden	Torana SL/R 5000	Jesus Racing	09	(Australia) Andrew Fisher	PM	1–3
Pontiac	Firebird	Northwest Auto Electrical	56	(New Zealand) Rod Hayman	INV	5
Pontiac	Firebird	Keltic Racing	101	(United Kingdom) Tony Quinn	INV	5

== Standings ==
Pos.	Driver	Car	SYD				SYM				HID				BEN				BAT				SAN				Points
Pos.	Driver	Car	T	R1	R2	R3	T	R1	R2	R3	T	R1	R2	R3	T	R1	R2	R3	T	R1	R2	R3	T	R1	R2	R3	Points
1	(Australia) Joel Heinrich																										196
2	(Australia) Andrew Fisher																										177
3	(Australia) Cameron Tilley																										156
4	(Australia) Ryan Hansford																										154
5	(Australia) Steven Johnson																										137
6	(Australia) Danny Buzadzic																										134
7	(Australia) Scott Cameron																										128
8	(Australia) Jude Bargwanna																										128
9	(Australia) Tony Karanfilovski																										113
10	(Australia) Peter Burnitt																										113
11	(Australia) Jeremy Hassell																										110
12	(Australia) David Hender																										88
13	(Australia) Jamie Tilley																										68
14	(Australia) Marcus Zukanovic																										65
15	(Australia) Rod Cannon																										47
16	(Australia) Ben Dunn																										28
Invitational
