= 2025 Aussie Racing Car Series =

Motor racing competition

The 2025 Aussie Racing Cars Series (known for commercial reasons as the 2025 Battery World Aussie Racing Cars Super Series) was the 25th year of national competition in Aussie Racing Cars. The series utilised miniature silhouette racing car class, styled as scaled-down versions of sports cars including the Mustang and Camaro used in the Supercars Championship, and powered by a 1300cc motorcycle engine. The season began at Sydney Motorsport Park on 21 March and concluded at the Adelaide Street Circuit on 30 November.

The season was won by Kody Garland; clinching the title in the final round in a thrilling battle with title rival and defending champion, Joel Heinrich.

== Calendar ==
The 2025 calendar involved the series supporting the Supercars Championship at four events, as well as the GT World Challenge Australia, and the Australian Superbike Championship. The remaining round will be part of the Trophy Tour, a new event series for 2025.

Rnd	Circuit	Dates	Supporting	Map
1	(New South Wales) Sydney Motorsport Park	21–23 March	National Sports Sedan Series; Trophy Tour; Toyota Gazoo Racing Australia Scholarship Series	2025 Aussie Racing Car Series is located in Australia
2	(Tasmania) Symmons Plains Raceway	9–11 May	Supercars Championship; Super2 Series; Touring Car Masters; SuperUtes Series	2025 Aussie Racing Car Series is located in Australia
3	(Western Australia) Wanneroo Raceway	6–8 June	Supercars Championship; SuperUtes Series	2025 Aussie Racing Car Series is located in Australia
4	(Victoria (state)) Sandown Raceway	25–27 July	GT World Challenge Australia; GT4 Australia Series; Australian National Trans Am Series; Radical Cup Australia	2025 Aussie Racing Car Series is located in Australia
5	(South Australia) The Bend Motorsport Park	12–14 September	TCR World Tour; TCR Australia Touring Car Series; Supercars Championship; Porsche Carrera Cup Australia; Australian National Trans Am Series; Touring Car Masters	2025 Aussie Racing Car Series is located in Australia
6	(New South Wales) Surfers Paradise Street Circuit	24–26 October	Supercars Championship; Porsche Carrera Cup Australia	2025 Aussie Racing Car Series is located in Australia
7	(South Australia) Adelaide Street Circuit	27–30 November	Supercars Championship; Porsche Carrera Cup Australia; Australian National Trans Am Series; Super2 Series	2025 Aussie Racing Car Series is located in Australia

== Entries ==
Manufacturer	Model	Entrant	No.	Driver	Rounds
ARC	Euro GT	Eltrix Racing	24	(Australia) Alastair Koenig	1
ARC	Euro GT	TFH Hire Services	777	(Australia) Desmond Collier	2–3, 6
Chevrolet	Camaro	Riskie Racing	4	(Australia) Scott Andriske	3–7
Chevrolet	Camaro	Riskie Racing	57	(Australia) Brandon Madden	All
Chevrolet	Camaro	Star Electrical/Active Asphalt	11	(Australia) Layton Mckechnie	7
Chevrolet	Camaro	PCA Racing	14	(Australia) Matt Gooding	1, 5, 7
Chevrolet	Camaro	Butler Fabrication | Team Grand Racing	17	(Australia) Denis Butler	1–2, 5–6
Chevrolet	Camaro	TFH Racing	18	(Australia) Diesel Thomas	3–7
Chevrolet	Camaro	City Sweep Racing	19	(Australia) Chris Mercer	1, 6
Chevrolet	Camaro	Action Line Marking	23	(Australia) Scott Dornan	All
Chevrolet	Camaro	K&S Motorsport	27	(Australia) Kyle Lovering	1–2, 6
Chevrolet	Camaro	Team 33 / Everything Fleet	33	(Australia) Andrew Hamilton	1, 3
Chevrolet	Camaro	Corish Motorsports	36	(Australia) Joshua Anderson	1, 7
Chevrolet	Camaro	Johnston Craill Racing Enterprises	42	(Australia) Kim Anderson	2, 4
Chevrolet	Camaro	WSM/NXGEN Cabling	44	(Australia) John Steffenson	3, 6
Chevrolet	Camaro	Pro Cool Racing | Motorsport 25	47	(Australia) Troy Jones	1–3, 6–7
Chevrolet	Camaro	Ballarat Performance Wreckers	55	(Australia) Nathan Barber	4–5, 7
Chevrolet	Camaro	Axil Coffee Rosters	65	(Australia) David Makin	1–2, 4–5, 7
Chevrolet	Camaro	Cody McKay Motorsports	69	(Australia) Cody McKay	All
Chevrolet	Camaro	Osborn's Transport	86	(Australia) Brett Osborn	1, 3, 7
Chevrolet	Camaro	Koan Solutions - Crete & Works	91	(Australia) Anthony Di Mauro	7
Chevrolet	Camaro	Norganic Proteins Australia	101	(Australia) Caleb Paterson	7
Chevrolet	Camaro	CNH Racing	195	(Australia) Hayden Nissen	1, 4, 6
Chevrolet	Camaro	Cottrell Racing	410	(Australia) Adrian Cottrell	7
Ford	Falcon	Stonkin Donks	8	(Australia) Glenn Boyd	7
Ford	Mustang	Osborn's Transport	1	(Australia) Joel Heinrich	All
Ford	Mustang	Johnston Craill Racing Enterprises	8	(Australia) Asher Johnston	1–2
Ford	Mustang	Johnston Craill Racing Enterprises	38	(Australia) Jack Boyd	1–2, 4–6
Ford	Mustang	Jascott Civil | Reynovate Constructions	9	(Australia) Ryan Reynolds	1–6
Ford	Mustang	Speedliner Adelaide	11	(Australia) Layton McKechnie	1, 5
Ford	Mustang	Mable	15	(Australia) Emma Clark	1, 5, 7
Ford	Mustang	Western Sydney Motorsport	20	(Australia) Craig Thompson	1, 6
Ford	Mustang	Western Sydney Motorsport	72	(Australia) Craig Thompson	7
Ford	Mustang	Western Sydney Motorsport	78	(Australia) Grant Thompson	1
Ford	Mustang	Western Sydney Motorsport	96	(Australia) Jeff Watters	All
Ford	Mustang	Safe Direction Racing	21	(Australia) Shane Mann	1–5
Ford	Mustang	Motorsport 25	22	(Australia) Scott O'Keefe	1, 3, 7
Ford	Mustang	Motorsport 25	25	(Australia) Reece Chapman	1–3, 7
Ford	Mustang	Norganic Proteins Australia	28	(Australia) Kent Quinn	2, 4, 7
Ford	Mustang	Norganic Proteins Australia	101	(Australia) Caleb Paterson	1–6
Ford	Mustang	Kody Garland Motorsport	41	(Australia) Kody Garland	All
Ford	Mustang	WSM/NXGEN Cabling	44	(Australia) John Steffensen	7
Ford	Mustang	Corish Motorsport	51	(Australia) Oscar Pederson	4–5, 7
Ford	Mustang	Corish Motorsport	54	(Australia) Mason Harvey	1–6
Ford	Mustang	Corish Motorsport	87	(Australia) Andrew Corish	All
Ford	Mustang	Riskie Racing	57	(Australia) Brandon Madden	1–6
Ford	Mustang	Riskie Racing	58	(Australia) Joseph Andriske	2–5, 7
Ford	Mustang	Competition Coatings	95	(Australia) Nathan Williams	1, 4–7
Ford	Mustang	TFH Racing	777	(Australia) Desmond Collier	3–4, 6
Ford	Mustang	TFH Racing	777	(Australia) Josh Thomas	7
Ford	Mustang	TFH Racing	888	(Australia) Scott Andriske	2
Ford	Mustang	TFH Racing	888	(Australia) Josh Thomas	3, 5–6
Nissan	Altima	Chivas Motorsport	6	(Australia) Ian Chivas	1
Toyota	Aurion	Kart Mania	16	(Australia) William Rowe	7
Toyota	Aurion	Precision International	26	(Australia) Jacob Currie	7
Toyota	Aurion	Fair Dinkum Builds	33	(Australia) Greg Edwards	7
Toyota	Aurion	Johnston Craill Racing Enterprises	38	(Australia) Jack Boyd	7
Toyota	Aurion	Holidays of the World	176	(Australia) Dean Michalik	7

== Results and standings ==
=== Results ===
Rnd		Circuit	Date	Pole position	Fastest lap	Winning driver	Winning team
1	R1	Sydney Motorsport Park (Eastern Creek, New South Wales)	21–23 March	(Australia) Kody Garland	(Australia) Mason Harvey	(Australia) Joel Heinrich	Osborn's Transport
1	R2	Sydney Motorsport Park (Eastern Creek, New South Wales)	21–23 March		(Australia) Joel Heinrich	(Australia) Kody Garland	Kody Garland Motorsport
1	R3	Sydney Motorsport Park (Eastern Creek, New South Wales)	21–23 March		Race cancelled		
1	R4	Sydney Motorsport Park (Eastern Creek, New South Wales)	21–23 March		(Australia) Reece Chapman	(Australia) Joel Heinrich	Osborn's Transport
2	R1	Symmons Plains Raceway (Launceston, Tasmania)	9–11 May	(Australia) Scott Andriske	(Australia) Kody Garland	(Australia) Scott Andriske	TFH Racing
2	R2	Symmons Plains Raceway (Launceston, Tasmania)	9–11 May		(Australia) Mason Harvey	(Australia) Mason Harvey	Corish Motorsport
2	R3	Symmons Plains Raceway (Launceston, Tasmania)	9–11 May		(Australia) Mason Harvey	(Australia) Kody Garland	Kody Garland Motorsport
2	R4	Symmons Plains Raceway (Launceston, Tasmania)	9–11 May		(Australia) Scott Andriske	(Australia) Mason Harvey	Corish Motorsport
3	R1	Wanneroo Raceway (Neerabup, Western Australia)	6–8 June	(Australia) Joel Heinrich	(Australia) Joel Heinrich	(Australia) Joel Heinrich	Osborn's Transport
3	R2	Wanneroo Raceway (Neerabup, Western Australia)	6–8 June		(Australia) Joel Heinrich	(Australia) Joel Heinrich	Osborn's Transport
3	R3	Wanneroo Raceway (Neerabup, Western Australia)	6–8 June		(Australia) Joel Heinrich	(Australia) Mason Harvey	Corish Motorsport
3	R4	Wanneroo Raceway (Neerabup, Western Australia)	6–8 June		(Australia) Joel Heinrich	(Australia) Joel Heinrich	Osborn's Transport
4	R1	(Victoria (state)) Sandown Raceway (Melbourne, Victoria)	25–27 July	(Australia) Joel Heinrich	(Australia) Joel Heinrich	(Australia) Kody Garland	Kody Garland Motorsport
4	R2	(Victoria (state)) Sandown Raceway (Melbourne, Victoria)	25–27 July		(Australia) Joel Heinrich	(Australia) Joel Heinrich	Osborn's Transport
4	R3	(Victoria (state)) Sandown Raceway (Melbourne, Victoria)	25–27 July		(Australia) Kody Garland	(Australia) Kody Garland	Kody Garland Motorsport
4	R4	(Victoria (state)) Sandown Raceway (Melbourne, Victoria)	25–27 July		(Australia) Joel Heinrich	(Australia) Joel Heinrich	Osborn's Transport
5	R1	The Bend Motorsport Park (Tailem Bend, South Australia)	12–14 September	(Australia) Joel Heinrich	(Australia) Joel Heinrich	(Australia) Brandon Madden	Riskie Racing
5	R2	The Bend Motorsport Park (Tailem Bend, South Australia)	12–14 September		Race cancelled		
5	R3	The Bend Motorsport Park (Tailem Bend, South Australia)	12–14 September		(Australia) Joel Heinrich	(Australia) Brandon Madden	Riskie Racing
5	R4	The Bend Motorsport Park (Tailem Bend, South Australia)	12–14 September		(Australia) Kody Garland	(Australia) Brandon Madden	Riskie Racing
6	R1	Surfers Paradise Street Circuit (Surfers Paradise, Queensland)	24–26 October	(Australia) Joel Heinrich	(Australia) Kody Garland	(Australia) Kody Garland	Kody Garland Motorsport
6	R2	Surfers Paradise Street Circuit (Surfers Paradise, Queensland)	24–26 October		(Australia) Kody Garland	(Australia) Kody Garland	Kody Garland Motorsport
6	R3	Surfers Paradise Street Circuit (Surfers Paradise, Queensland)	24–26 October		(Australia) Kody Garland	(Australia) Kody Garland	Kody Garland Motorsport
6	R4	Surfers Paradise Street Circuit (Surfers Paradise, Queensland)	24–26 October		Race cancelled		
7	R1	Adelaide Street Circuit (Adelaide, South Australia)	27–30 November	(Australia) Kody Garland	(Australia) Kody Garland	(Australia) Kody Garland	Kody Garland Motorsport
7	R2	Adelaide Street Circuit (Adelaide, South Australia)	27–30 November		(Australia) Kody Garland	(Australia) Kody Garland	Kody Garland Motorsport
7	R3	Adelaide Street Circuit (Adelaide, South Australia)	27–30 November		Race cancelled		
7	R4	Adelaide Street Circuit (Adelaide, South Australia)	27–30 November		(Australia) Kody Garland	(Australia) Kody Garland	Kody Garland Motorsport

=== Standings ===
Pos.	Driver	SYD (New South Wales)				TAS (Tasmania)				PER (Western Australia)				SAN (Victoria (state))				BEN (South Australia)				SUR (Queensland)				ADE (South Australia)				Points
Pos.	Driver	R1	R2	R3	R4	R1	R2	R3	R4	R1	R2	R3	R4	R1	R2	R3	R4	R1	R2	R3	R4	R1	R2	R3	R4	R1	R2	R3	R4	Points
1	(Australia) Kody Garland	2	1	C	2	2	2	1	2	3	4	5	2	1	3	1	DNS	2	C	3	4	1	1	1	C	1	1	C	1	300
2	(Australia) Joel Heinrich	1	3	C	1	3	7	3	5	1	1	4	1	3	1	13	1	Ret	C	2	2	2	2	2	C	2	2	C	13	296
3	(Australia) Brandon Madden	Ret	DNS	C	DNS	5	4	4	4	9	7	6	11	11	6	2	3	1	C	1	1	4	5	8	C	5	5	C	3	290
4	(Australia) Caleb Paterson	Ret	Ret	C	16	21	11	5	6	2	3	2	4	2	2	10	2	3	C	6	5	6	4	Ret	C	4	3	C	2	285
5	(Australia) Reece Chapman	4	Ret	C	3	7	Ret	6	3	Ret	12	11	13	8	9	Ret	8	4	C	DNS	Ret	Ret	7	4	C	11	Ret	C	5	256
6	(Australia) Andrew Corish	10	11	C	14	8	12	7	10	10	13	13	9	13	16	6	11	24	C	19	15	14	8	3	C	Ret	Ret	C	17	254
7	(Australia) Cody McKay	7	Ret	C	12	11	10	9	14	8	Ret	12	10	10	Ret	15	7	7	C	7	6	10	14	16	C	8	11	C	9	251
8	(Australia) Scott Dornan	6	4	C	7	9	Ret	21	8	Ret	11	9	20	9	5	Ret	9	8	C	8	Ret	Ret	13	9	C	13	10	C	18	246
9	(Australia) Jack Boyd	5	5	C	6	10	6	8	7					18	7	8	5	6	C	5	13	3	3	7	C	3	4	C	4	240
10	(Australia) Mason Harvey	3	2	C	Ret	4	1	2	1	5	2	1	3	17	11	4	6	15	C	Ret	8	8	Ret	12	C					229
11	(Australia) Nathan Williams	24	7	C	4									5	4	5	16	11	C	14	10	5	Ret	6	C	10	8	C	24	219
12	(Australia) Scott Andriske					1	3	Ret	Ret	7	9	Ret	16	12	21	11	10	26	C	9	7	7	12	14	C	6	6	C	7	217
13	(Australia) Diesel Thomas									11	5	8	7	7	17	7	Ret	5	C	4	3	Ret	Ret	11	C	9	9	C	6	210
14	(Australia) Ryan Reynolds	Ret	6	C	18	19	9	11	12	Ret	10	3	12	4	Ret	3	4	10	C	10	DNS	9	6	Ret	C					204
15	(Australia) Jeff Watters	17	14	C	Ret	16	Ret	16	20	17	18	17	19	21	14	16	17	21	C	23	Ret	19	15	DNS	C	27	24	C	22	184
16	(Australia) Joseph Andriske					12	8	10	11	15	15	Ret	DNS	16	19	18	14	18	C	22	12					28	29	C	28	168
17	(Australia) Shane Mann	21	16	C	21	18	16	17	17	12	14	14	17	19	15	14	15	12	C	DNS	DNS									158
18	(Australia) David Makin	19	22	C	DNS	14	18	15	15					20	13	9	13	14	C	11	18					18	27	C	DNS	156
19	(Australia) Troy Jones	22	18	C	20	20	15	18	18	14	16	DNS	18									18	Ret	18	C	25	25	C	27	150
20	(Australia) Josh Thomas									4	8	7	8					Ret	C	12	11	15	11	10	C	26	21	C	DNS	144
21	(Australia) Scott O'Keefe	12	8	C	Ret					6	6	10	5													15	14	C	14	143
22	(Australia) Hayden Nissen	14	24	C	8									14	12	17	12					12	9	5	C					127
23	(Australia) Denis Butler	15	Ret	C	10	17	Ret	19	DNS									Ret	C	25	20	17	DNS	DNS	C					117
24	(Australia) Brett Osborn	9	9	C	9					16	17	16	15													23	26	C	25	111
25	(Australia) Matt Gooding	11	15	C	13													Ret	C	21	DNS					17	17	C	Ret	110
26	(Australia) Kent Quinn					6	5	Ret	9					6	8	Ret	DNS									14	13	C	19	109
27	(Australia) Oscar Pederson													22	18	12	18	13	C	Ret	14					21	18	C	12	105
28	(Australia) Craig Thompson	Ret	10	C	17																	13	Ret	13	C	16	12	C	21	100
29	(Australia) Kyle Lovering	16	17	C	19	15	14	14	16													DNS	Ret	17	C					98
30	(Australia) Desmond Collier					13	13	13	Ret	Ret	Ret	18	16									20	Ret	Ret	C					96
31	(Australia) John Steffensen									13	Ret	15	14									11	Ret	Ret	C	19	32	C	Ret	94
32	(Australia) Nathan Barber													15	10	DNS	DNS	20	C	17	Ret					22	15	C	20	92
33	(Australia) Layton McKechnie	25	23	C	23													17	C	15	Ret					31	31	C	23	79
34	(Australia) Asher Johnston	26	12	C	11	Ret	19	12	13																					74
35	(Australia) Chris Mercer	8	Ret	C	15																	16	10	Ret	C					73
36	(Australia) Joshua Andersen	Ret	Ret	C	5																					Ret	20	C	8	71
37	(Australia) Jacob Currie																	9	C	13	16					Ret	33	C	15	70
38	(Australia) Emma Clark	18	20	C	DNS													25	C	24	21					30	28	C	DNS	68
39	(Australia) Glenn Boyd																	23	C	16	17					24	22	C	16	65
40	(Australia) Anthony Di Mauro																	Ret	C	Ret	DNS					12	16	C	11	63
41	(Australia) Kim Andersen					22	17	19	19					Ret	20	19	19													62
42	(Australia) William Rowe																	16	C	18	Ret					20	19	C	Ret	55
43	(Australia) Greg Edwards																	22	C	20	19					32	30	C	26	52
44	(Australia) Andrew Hamilton	23	21	C	DNS					Ret	Ret	DNS	DNS																	52
45	(Australia) Dean Michalik																	19	C	Ret	DNS					29	23	C	29	46
46	(Australia) Adrian Cottrell																									7	7	C	10	44
47	(Australia) Keith Bensley																					21	16	20	C					32
48	(Australia) Grant Thompson	13	19	C	22																									31
49	(Australia) Hayden Pullen																					22	17	19	C					31
50	(Australia) Alastair Koenig	20	13	C	DNS																									25
51	(Australia) Ian Chivas	DNS	DNS	DNS	DNS																									20
Pos.	Driver	SYD (New South Wales)				TAS (Tasmania)				PER (Western Australia)				SAN (Victoria (state))				BEN (South Australia)				SUR (Queensland)				ADE (South Australia)				Points
Pos.	Driver	R1	R2	R3	R4	R1	R2	R3	R4	R1	R2	R3	R4	R1	R2	R3	R4	R1	R2	R3	R4	R1	R2	R3	R4	R1	R2	R3	R4	Points
