= 2025 SuperUtes Series =

Motor racing competition

The 2025 V8 SuperUtes Series (known for commercial reasons as the 2025 Tyrepower V8 SuperUtes Series) is a motor racing competition for V8 SuperUtes. It is the seventh running of the SuperUtes Series.

The Series was won by David Sieders.

== Calendar ==
The 2025 calendar was revealed on 10 December 2024.

Event	Circuit	Dates	Supporting
1	(New South Wales) Sydney Motorsport Park	21–23 February	Supercars Championship; Porsche Carrera Cup Australia; Touring Car Masters; Super2 Series
2	(Tasmania) Symmons Plains Raceway	9–11 May	Supercars Championship; Aussie Racing Car Series; Touring Car Masters; Super2 Series
3	(Western Australia) Wanneroo Raceway	6–8 June	Supercars Championship; Aussie Racing Car Series
4	(Queensland) Reid Park Street Circuit	11–13 July	Supercars Championship; Porsche Sprint Challenge Australia; GR Cup; Super2 Series
5	(New South Wales) Mount Panorama Circuit	9–12 October	Supercars Championship; Porsche Carrera Cup Australia; Touring Car Masters; GR Cup; Super2 Series
6	(Victoria (state)) Sandown Raceway	14–16 November	Supercars Championship; Porsche Sprint Challenge Australia; Touring Car Masters; GR Cup

== Entries ==
All Entries use a Chevrolet LS3 V8

Manufacturer	Model	Entrant	No.	Driver Name	Rounds
Ford	Ranger	Sieders Racing Team	10	(Australia) Cade Bell	3
Ford	Ranger	Sieders Racing Team	78	(Australia) Zak Best	4
Ford	Ranger	Sieders Racing Team	444	(Australia) Shaun Richardson	1–2
Ford	Ranger	My Construct Racing	21	(Australia) Matt Nolan	5–6
Ford	Ranger	Allgate Motorsport	49	(Australia) Chris Formosa	1–4
Ford	Ranger	Uniden	78	(Australia) Richard Mork	6
Ford	Ranger	Uniden	93	(Australia) Richard Mork	5
Ford	Ranger (T6)	Scott Taylor Motorsport	67	(Australia) Paul Morris	1–4
Ford	Ranger (T6)	Scott Taylor Motorsport	222	(Australia) Scott Taylor	1–5
Holden	Colorado	Team Forty One	41	(Australia) Adrian Cottrell	1–2
Holden	Colorado	Apogee Motorsport	41	(Australia) Adrian Cottrell	3–6
Holden	Colorado	Apogee Motorsport	65	(Australia) Glen Melling	3–6
Holden	Colorado	Apogee Motorsport	333	(Australia) Rossi Johnson	All
Isuzu	D-Max (RG)	Sieders Racing Team	1	(Australia) Adam Marjoram	All
Isuzu	D-Max (RG)	Sieders Racing Team	4	(Australia) Aaron Borg	All
Isuzu	D-Max (RG)	EFS 4x4 Accessories	7	(Australia) Cameron Crick	4, 6
Isuzu	D-Max (RG)	EFS 4x4 Accessories	7	(Australia) Dean Campbell	5
Isuzu	D-Max (RT)	Holly Espray Motorsport	777	(Australia) Holly Espray	All
Mazda	BT-50	Vast Motorsport	9	(Australia) Amar Sharma	1–2
Mazda	BT-50	Apogee Motorsport	26	(Australia) Luke Webber	1, 3–5
Mazda	BT-50	Apogee Motorsport	26	(Australia) Gavin Newman	6
Mazda	BT-50 (TF)	Sieders Racing Team	3	(Australia) David Sieders	All
Mazda	BT-50 (TF)	Sieders Racing Team	76	(Australia) Ellexandra Best	All
Mazda	BT-50 (TF)	EFS 4x4 Accessories	7	(Australia) Ryal Harris	1
Mazda	BT-50 (TF)	EFS 4x4 Accessories	7	(Australia) Cameron Crick	2
Mazda	BT-50 (TF)	Vast Motorsport	9	(Australia) Amar Sharma	3–6
Mitsubishi	Triton	Sieders Racing Team	28	(Australia) Anthony Jewell	3–4
Mitsubishi	Triton	Sieders Racing Team	33	(Australia) Sean Evans	6
Mitsubishi	Triton	Sieders Racing Team	50	(Australia) Jimmy Vernon	All
Mitsubishi	Triton	Sieders Racing Team	90	(Australia) Jayden Wanzek	1–2, 5–6
Mitsubishi	Triton	Sieders Racing Team	782	(Australia) Dave Casey	1–5
Mitsubishi	Triton	Michael Sherwell Racing	55	(Australia) Michael Sherwell	All
Toyota	Hilux	Auto Masters Racing	8	(Australia) Jason Norris	All
Toyota	Hilux	Western Sydney Motorsport	18	(Australia) Cody Brewczynski	All
Toyota	Hilux	Western Sydney Motorsport	64	(Australia) Craig Woods	All
Toyota	Hilux	Western Sydney Motorsport	96	(Australia) Brad Vereker	All
Toyota	Hilux	AIV Racing	805	(Australia) Jensen Engelhardt	All

== Results and standings ==
=== Summary ===
Rd	Race	Event	Pole position	Fastest lap	Winning driver	Winning team	Winning manufacturer	Source	Round Winner
1	R1	(New South Wales) Eastern Creek	(Australia) David Sieders	(Australia) Adam Marjoram	(Australia) Aaron Borg	Sieders Racing Team	(Japan) Isuzu		(Australia) David Sieders
1	R2	(New South Wales) Eastern Creek		(Australia) Jayden Wanzek	(Australia) Jayden Wanzek	Sieders Racing Team	(Japan) Mitsubishi		(Australia) David Sieders
1	R3	(New South Wales) Eastern Creek		(Australia) Adam Marjoram	(Australia) David Sieders	Sieders Racing Team	(Japan) Mazda		(Australia) David Sieders
1	R4	(New South Wales) Eastern Creek		(Australia) Jayden Wanzek	(Australia) Adam Marjoram	Sieders Racing Team	(Japan) Isuzu		(Australia) David Sieders
2	R1	(Tasmania) Symmons Plains	(Australia) Jayden Wanzek	(Australia) Jayden Wanzek	(Australia) Cody Brewczynski	Western Sydney Motorsport	(Japan) Toyota		(Australia) Aaron Borg
2	R2	(Tasmania) Symmons Plains		(Australia) Adam Marjoram	(Australia) Adam Marjoram	Sieders Racing Team	(Japan) Isuzu		(Australia) Aaron Borg
2	R3	(Tasmania) Symmons Plains		(Australia) Cody Brewczynski	(Australia) Aaron Borg	Sieders Racing Team	(Japan) Isuzu		(Australia) Aaron Borg
2	R4	(Tasmania) Symmons Plains		(Australia) Cody Brewczynski	(Australia) Aaron Borg	Sieders Racing Team	(Japan) Isuzu		(Australia) Aaron Borg
3	R1	(Western Australia) Perth	(Australia) David Sieders	(Australia) David Sieders	(Australia) Adam Marjoram	Sieders Racing Team	(Japan) Isuzu		(Australia) Cody Brewczynski
3	R2	(Western Australia) Perth		(Australia) David Sieders	(Australia) Cody Brewczynski	Western Sydney Motorsport	(Japan) Toyota		(Australia) Cody Brewczynski
3	R3	(Western Australia) Perth		(Australia) Cody Brewczynski	(Australia) Cody Brewczynski	Western Sydney Motorsport	(Japan) Toyota		(Australia) Cody Brewczynski
3	R4	(Western Australia) Perth		(Australia) Cody Brewczynski	(Australia) Cody Brewczynski	Western Sydney Motorsport	(Japan) Toyota		(Australia) Cody Brewczynski
4	R1	(Queensland) Townsville	(Australia) Cameron Crick	(Australia) Adam Marjoram	(Australia) Adam Marjoram	Sieders Racing Team	(Japan) Isuzu		(Australia) Adam Marjoram
4	R2	(Queensland) Townsville		(Australia) Zak Best	(Australia) Cameron Crick	EFS 4x4 Accessories	(Japan) Isuzu		(Australia) Adam Marjoram
4	R3	(Queensland) Townsville		(Australia) Cameron Crick	(Australia) Adam Marjoram	Sieders Racing Team	(Japan) Isuzu		(Australia) Adam Marjoram
4	R4	(Queensland) Townsville		(Australia) Cameron Crick	(Australia) Adam Marjoram	Sieders Racing Team	(Japan) Isuzu		(Australia) Adam Marjoram
5	R1	(New South Wales) Bathurst	(Australia) Cody Brewczynski	(Australia) David Sieders	(Australia) David Sieders	Sieders Racing Team	(Japan) Mazda		(Australia) Cody Brewczynski
5	R2	(New South Wales) Bathurst		(Australia) Jayden Wanzek	(Australia) Jayden Wanzek	Sieders Racing Team	(Japan) Mitsubishi		(Australia) Cody Brewczynski
5	R3	(New South Wales) Bathurst		(Australia) Jayden Wanzek	(Australia) Cody Brewczynski	Western Sydney Motorsport	(Japan) Toyota		(Australia) Cody Brewczynski
5	R4	(New South Wales) Bathurst		(Australia) Cody Brewczynski	(Australia) Cody Brewczynski	Western Sydney Motorsport	(Japan) Toyota		(Australia) Cody Brewczynski
6	R1	(Victoria (state)) Sandown	(Australia) David Sieders	(Australia) Adam Marjoram	(Australia) Adam Marjoram	Sieders Racing Team	(Japan) Isuzu		(Australia) David Sieders
6	R2	(Victoria (state)) Sandown		(Australia) Cameron Crick	(Australia) Cody Brewczynski	Western Sydney Motorsport	(Japan) Toyota		(Australia) David Sieders
6	R3	(Victoria (state)) Sandown		(Australia) Adam Marjoram	(Australia) David Sieders	Sieders Racing Team	(Japan) Mazda		(Australia) David Sieders
6	R4	(Victoria (state)) Sandown		Race Canceled (Note: Race 4 was cancelled due to the condition of the race track was deemed to dangerous due to a giant oil spill from a competitor during the Touring Car Masters race prior to this race.)					(Australia) David Sieders

=== Series Standings ===
Pos.	Driver	SMP				SYM				BAR				TOW				BAT				SAN				Pen	Points
1	(Australia) David Sieders	3	3	1	3	4	4	5	5	3	2	3	3	4	4	3	3	1	5	2	2	2	2	1	C	0	1268
2	(Australia) Adam Marjoram	2	6	3	1	6	1	2	3	1	8	2	2	1	3	1	1	4	2	7	5	1	17	2	C	0	1261
3	(Australia) Cody Brewczynski	4	2	2	2	1	2	3	4	2	1	1	1	3	Ret	7	8	2	6	1	1	5	1	Ret	C	0	1180
4	(Australia) Aaron Borg	1	5	Ret	6	3	3	1	1	4	4	4	4	5	2	12	6	3	Ret	10	8	3	Ret	5	C	0	1139
5	(Australia) Jimmy Vernon	8	20	5	4	15	5	18	7	6	7	6	7	9	8	11	11	10	4	8	7	6	4	4	C	0	988
6	(Australia) Rossi Johnson	9	9	6	6	12	13	6	6	5	3	Ret	DNS	7	Ret	10	9	6	7	4	4	13	5	9	C	0	893
7	(Australia) Adrian Cottrell	6	4	4	5	16	9	20	19	Ret	10	10	Ret	12	6	4	4	7	3	6	10	14	7	11	C	0	854
8	(Australia) Jason Norris	11	8	7	20	13	11	Ret	14	9	9	7	8	11	9	6	12	14	10	11	11	16	10	12	C	0	833
9	(Australia) Brad Vereker	13	12	8	18	10	8	10	17	13	12	13	Ret	10	7	19	15	19	12	12	13	9	8	10	C	0	778
10	(Australia) Holly Espray	10	7	12	DNS	17	10	11	11	17	Ret	16	14	19	11	15	16	9	9	9	9	10	13	8	C	0	765
11	(Australia) Craig Woods	21	10	19	Ret	5	12	14	13	7	5	9	5	6	Ret	DNS	DNS	8	8	5	6	8	6	7	C	0	762
12	(Australia) Michael Sherwell	15	14	11	9	11	7	7	9	16	11	8	20	18	Ret	13	17	11	11	19	Ret	11	Ret	13	C	0	730
13	(Australia) David Casey	7	Ret	13	8	9	19	8	8	12	15	11	9	16	14	14	13	13	Ret	15	16					0	697
14	(Australia) Jayden Wanzek	5	1	14	17	2	14	4	2									5	1	3	3	7	Ret	6	C	0	696
15	(Australia) Paul Morris	12	11	9	10	7	6	9	10	10	6	5	6	14	13	16	10									0	649
16	(Australia) Ellexandra Best	17	19	15	16	18	15	15	16	18	19	19	18	21	Ret	20	20	20	17	18	15	18	14	15	C	0	607
17	(Australia) Amar Sharma	22	15	20	11	19	21	13	22	14	21	14	11	17	18	Ret	Ret	16	18	Ret	17	12	12	14	C	0	573
18	(Australia) Jensen Engelhardt	18	Ret	Ret	12	14	18	12	12	11	14	15	15	Ret	15	Ret	19	17	Ret	16	Ret	17	9	16	C	0	546
19	(Australia) Cameron Crick					8	Ret	19	15					2	1	2	2					4	3	3	C	0	503
20	(Australia) Luke Webber	14	13	10	19					15	18	17	12	15	10	9	14	12	19	Ret	12					0	501
21	(Australia) Scott Taylor	20	16	18	14	22	17	16	20	21	20	22	16	22	17	18	18	15	14	Ret	DNS					0	451
22	(Australia) Chris Formosa	19	18	16	13	21	16	17	18	19	17	20	17	20	16	Ret	22									0	389
23	(Australia) Anthony Jewell									8	13	12	10	13	12	5	7									0	327
24	(Australia) Glen Melling									Ret	Ret	21	19	23	19	17	21	23	DNS	DNS	DNS	Ret	16	17	C	0	211
25	(Australia) Zak Best													8	5	8	5									0	184
26	(Australia) Shaun Richardson	16	17	17	15	20	20	Ret	21																	0	181
27	(Australia) Richard Mork																	21	16	17	18	20	15	Ret	C	0	148
28	(Australia) Matt Nolan																	22	15	14	Ret	15	11	Ret	C	0	136
29	(Australia) Dean Campbell																	18	13	13	14					0	128
30	(Australia) Cade Bell									20	16	18	13													0	113
31	(Australia) Gavin Newman																					19	Ret	18	C	0	58
32	(Australia) Sean Evans																					DNS	DNS	DNS	C	0	0
	(Australia) Ryal Harris	DNS	DNS	DNS	DNS																					0	0
Pos.	Driver	SMP				SYM				BAR				TOW				BAT				SAN				Pen	Points
