= Radical Cup Australia =

Sports car racing category in Australasia

The Radical Cup Australia is a national motor racing series for racing the Radical SR3, built by Radical Sportscars. The series is sanctioned by Motorsport Australia, and run by a joint venture of the two Australian importers of Radical cars.

== History ==
The current Radical Cup Australia was founded in 2022, but one-make racing for Radical cars in Australia dates back to at least 2011.

== Cars ==
Unmodified examples of the Radical SR3 (including most variants from throughout the model's history, and both 1340 and 1500cc engined models) are eligible to compete.

== Race format ==
The series is made up of a mixture of sprint (25-minute) and endurance (45 or 50-minute races).

Cars may (optionally) be shared between two drivers; if so, during endurance races there is a driver switch during a race pitstop; during a round featuring sprint races each driver drives two of the four races in the round.

Drivers are classified as Pro, Pro-Am or Am based on their age and professional experience in motorsport; there are multiple series trophies awarded, dependent on driver categorisation.

== Series winners ==
Caption
Year	Overall winner
2022	Chris Perini
2023	Alex Gardner
2024	Peter Paddon
2025	-
