= 1963 Sandown International Cup =

Motor car race

The 1963 Sandown International Cup was a motor race for Formula Libre cars, staged at Sandown Park, in Victoria, Australia on 11 March 1963. The race was contested over 60 laps of the two miles (3.2 km) circuit, a total distance of 120 miles (190 km). It was the second annual Sandown International Cup, the two races serving as the forerunners of the Sandown round of the annual Tasman Series from 1964 to 1975.

The race was won by Bruce McLaren driving a Cooper T62 Coventry Climax.

== Results ==
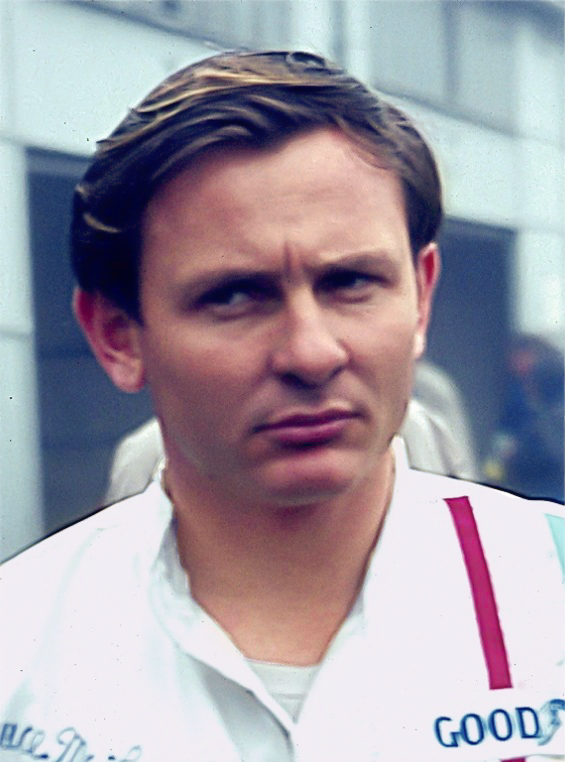
Race winner Bruce McLaren, pictured in 1966

Pos.	Driver	No	Car	Entrant	Laps
1	Bruce McLaren	10	Cooper T62 Coventry Climax FPF	B McLaren	60
2	Jack Brabham	4	Repco Brabham BT4 Coventry Climax FPF	Ecurie Vitesse	59
3	Tony Maggs	2	Lola Mk4 Coventry Climax FPF	Bowmaker Racing Team	59
4	David McKay	8	Repco Brabham BT4 Coventry Climax FPF	Scuderia Veloce	59
5	John Youl	5	Cooper T55 Coventry Climax FPF	John L Youl	58
6	Tony Shelley	11	Lotus 18/21 Coventry Climax FPF	T Shelley	58
7	Masten Gregory	1	Lola Mk4 Coventry Climax FPF	Bowmaker Racing Team	56
8	Bill Patterson	9	Cooper T53 Coventry Climax FPF	B Patterson Motors	51
9	Chris Amon	12	Cooper T53 Coventry Climax FPF	Scuderia Veloce	50
10	Bob Holden	13	Lynx Peugeot	Killara Motor Garage	41
DNF	Frank Gardner	47	Cooper T53 Coventry Climax FPF	Scuderia Birchwood	44
DNF	Jim Palmer	3	Cooper T53 Coventry Climax FPF	Bowmaker Racing Team	32
DNF	Lex Davison	14	Cooper T53 Coventry Climax FPF	Ecurie Australie	31
DNF	Bib Stillwell	6	Repco Brabham BT4 Coventry Climax FPF	BS Stillwell	17
DNF	Pat Hawthorn	24	Aston Martin DBR4/250 - BR1/300	Ecurie Australie	9
Disq	Bryan Thompson	17	Cooper T51 Coventry Climax FPF s/c	Ecurie Shepparton	40
DNS	Frank Matich	15	Elfin Junior Ford	Team Total	
DNS	Greg Cusack	37	Elfin Junior Ford	Scuderia Veloce	
DNS	Max Patterson		Ausper T2 Ford		
DNS	Ron Phillips	18	Lotus 20B Ford	J&R Phillips	

Notes:

- Attendance: 40,000
- Pole position: Bruce McLaren, 1m 10.4s
- Winner's race time: 1h 10m 03.8s
- Fastest Lap: Jack Brabham and Bruce McLaren, 1:08.1 (new lap record)
- Under 1500cc class winner: Bob Holden
