= Symmons Plains Raceway =

Motor sport race track in Tasmania, Australia

Symmons Plains
- Full Circuit (1960–present)
- Location: Launceston, Tasmania
- Coordinates: 41°39′34″S 147°15′10″E
- FIA Grade: 3
- Owner: Motorsports Tasmania
- Opened: March 1960; 66 years ago
- Major events: Current: Supercars Championship; Tasmania Super 440 (1969–1999, 2004–2019, 2021–present); SuperUtes Series (2022, 2025–present); Aussie Racing Cars (2005, 2008, 2011, 2013–2015, 2017, 2019, 2021–present); Former: Trans-Am Australia (2021–2025); TCR Australia (2021–2024); S5000 (2021–2023); Stadium Super Trucks (2021); Australian Superbike Championship (1991–1994, 1996, 1998, 2006–2011, 2013, 2015); Tasmanian Super Prix (2006–2008, 2010); Australian GT (1982, 2007)

Full Circuit (1960–present)
- Length: 2.411 km (1.498 mi)
- Turns: 7
- Race lap record: 0:48.5598 ( (Australia) Joey Mawson, Ligier JS F3-S5000, 2022, S5000)

Symmons Plains Raceway is a 2.411 km (1.498 mi) motor racing circuit in Australia, located about 30 km (19 mi) south of Launceston, Tasmania (via the Midland Highway). Since the closure of the Longford Circuit in the 1960s it has been Tasmania's premier motor racing facility. The circuit is one of the longest serving circuits of the combined history of the Australian Touring Car Championship and the Supercars Championship. Since 2004 it has hosted the Tasmania Super 440 for Supercars Championship.

In 2004, the facility received a A$3 million upgrade which included some modifications to the layout of the track, including moving the start/finish line back to a more conventional location opposite the pits. It had previously been on a curve (which is now located just after the first corner), unusual for a road course. Symmons Plains is also known for its extremely tight hairpin bend, known as Brambles Hairpin, at the end of the old front straight.

== The circuit ==
Symmons Plains Raceway is 2.411 km (1.498 mi) long and is very hard on brakes. The banking at the hairpin is a unique opportunity to overtake. The other overtaking opportunity is the left hander at the end of the back straight.

== Supercars Championship ==
The circuit has hosted rounds of the Australian Touring Car Championship and Supercars Championship since 1969. The circuit was left off the Supercars Championship calendar in 2000 before returning in 2004 after the upgrades were completed.

== Events ==
- May: Supercars Championship Tasmania Super 440, SuperUtes Series, Aussie Racing Cars, Touring Car Masters
- August: Symmons 6 Hour

Former

- Australian Drivers' Championship (1966–1967, 1969–1972, 1980, 1987, 1992–1993, 2006–2008, 2010–2013)
- Australian Formula 2 Championship (1971–1975, 1979, 1986–1987)
- Australian Formula 3 Championship (2002–2003, 2006–2008, 2010–2013)
- Australian Formula 4 Championship (2016, 2018)
- Australian Formula Ford Championship (1990–1993, 1995, 2006–2013, 2023–2024)
- Australian GT Championship (1982, 2007)
- Australian GT Production Car Championship (2002)
- Australian Improved Production Nationals (2001)
- Australian Mini Challenge (2008–2009)
- Australian National Trans-Am Series
  - Hi-Tec Oils Race Tasmania (2021–2025)
- Australian Nations Cup Championship (2002–2003)
- Australian Performance Car Championship (2002–2003, 2005–2007)
- Australian Production Car Championship (1988–1992, 1995, 2003, 2006, 2008, 2010)
- Australian Prototype Series (2025)
- Australian Super Touring Championship (1993, 1995, 2000)
- Australian Superbike Championship (1991–1994, 1996, 1998, 2006–2011, 2013, 2015)
- National Sports Sedan Series (1976–1981, 1992, 2024)
- Porsche Sprint Challenge Australia (2008, 2010, 2019, 2023–2024)
- S5000 Australian Drivers' Championship (2021–2023)
- Stadium Super Trucks (2021)
- Super2 Series (2017–2018, 2025)
- Tasmanian Super Prix (2006–2008, 2010)
- TCR Australia Touring Car Series (2021–2024)
- V8 Touring Car National Series (2010)
- V8 Ute Racing Series (2002–2003, 2005, 2007, 2009, 2012, 2016)

== Lap records ==
From 1980 to 2021, Alfredo Costanzo held the outright race lap record by setting a time of 0:50.16 seconds with Lola T430 Formula 5000. The closest anyone had come since 1980 was British driver James Winslow who set a time of 0:50.5036 seconds on 1 April 2012 while driving a Dallara F307.

Then, that outright lap record was broken in 2021 by driver Joey Mawson. Driving a Ligier JS F3-S5000, the Australian driver set a time of 0:49.7242 seconds. In 2022, the record was improved again by himself, by setting a time of 0:48.5598 seconds.

The 'Tassie Tin Tops' category included below is a combined closed car category not built to any specific set of regulations, it usually runs at major national meetings bringing together a collection of vehicles that usually compete in specific categories at Tasmanian State Championship race meetings, it usually includes Sports Sedans, Improved Production and Sports GT category vehicles.

As of May 2026, the fastest official race lap records at Symmons Plains Raceway are listed as:

| Category | Time | Driver | Car | Date |
Permanent Circuit (1960–present): 2.412 km (1.499 mi)
| S5000 | 0:48.5598 | (Australia) Joey Mawson | Ligier JS F3-S5000 | 12 February 2022 |
| Formula 5000 | 0:50.16 | (Australia) Alfredo Costanzo | Lola T430 | 23 March 1980 |
| Sports Sedans | 0:50.1985 | (Australia) Bradley Sherriff | Nissan Skyline R34 | 23 March 2025 |
| Formula 3 | 0:50.3278 | (Australia) Tim Macrow | Dallara F307 | 6 April 2013 |
| Supercars Championship | 0:51.2276 | (Australia) Mark Winterbottom | Holden ZB Commodore | 7 April 2019 |
| Tassie Tin Tops | 0:51.9152 | (Australia) Bradley Sherriff | Nissan Skyline R34 | 22 May 2026 |
| Porsche Carrera Cup | 0:52.1160 | (Australia) Clay Osborne | Porsche 911 (991 II) GT3 Cup | 18 August 2024 |
| GT3 | 0:52.5247 | (Australia) Bryce Washington | Lamborghini Gallardo | 2 September 2007 |
| Super2 Series | 0:52.7091 | (New Zealand) Chris Pither | Holden VF Commodore | 8 April 2018 |
| Superbike | 0:53.387 | (Australia) Josh Waters | Suzuki GSX-R1000 | 13 November 2011 |
| Trans-Am Australia | 0:53.9755 | (Australia) Kyle Gurton | Ford Mustang | 12 February 2022 |
| Sports GT | 0:53.9882 | (Australia) Tony Warren | Mitsubishi Evo | 7 April 2019 |
| Australian Formula 2 | 0:54.73 | (Australia) Jon Crooke | Cheetah Mk8 | 9 March 1986 |
| Touring Car Masters | 0:55.1795 | (Australia) Steven Johnson | Ford Mustang Trans-Am | 10 May 2025 |
| Formula Ford | 0:55.3004 | (New Zealand) Richie Stanaway | Mygale SJ09 | 31 May 2009 |
| N-GT | 0:55.3797 | (Australia) John Bowe | Ferrari 360 N-GT | 27 April 2003 |
| Supersport | 0:55.493 | (Australia) Jason O'Halloran | Yamaha YZF-R6 | 10 September 2006 |
| TCR Touring Car | 0:55.7811 | (Australia) Jay Hanson | Audi RS 3 LMS TCR (2021) | 12 February 2022 |
| Formula 4 | 0:55.8236 | (Australia) Cameron Shields | Mygale M14-F4 | 8 April 2018 |
| Group A | 0:55.97 | (New Zealand) Jim Richards | Nissan Skyline R32 GT-R | 10 March 1991 |
| Improved Production Cars | 0:57.0638 | (Australia) Jason House | BMW M3 (E92) | 18 May 2024 |
| Super Touring | 0:58.2963 | (Australia) Geoff Brabham | BMW 318i | 7 May 1995 |
| Group C (Australia) | 0:58.51 | (Australia) Peter Brock | Holden VH Commodore SS | 11 March 1984 |
| Aussie Racing Cars | 1:00.2149 | (Australia) Kody Garland | Ford Mustang (S197) | 10 May 2025 |
| V8 Superute Series | 1:00.2529 | (Australia) Adam Marjoram | Isuzu D-MAX | 10 May 2025 |
| 125cc Grand Prix | 1:00.681 | (Australia) Blake Leigh-Smith | Aprilia RSW 125 | 4 April 2009 |
| Group Nc | 1:01.5586 | (Australia) Leon Bell | Holden HQ Monaro | 10 November 2013 |
| V8 Ute Racing Series | 1:01.7761 | (Australia) Ryan Hansford | Ford FG Falcon Ute | 3 April 2016 |
| Moto3 | 1:02.716 | (Australia) Tom Bramich | Honda NSF250R | 6 September 2015 |
| Improved Production - U2L | 1:02.601 | (Australia) Kyle Smith | Datsun 1200 | 22 June 2025 |
| Group Nb | 1:07.7233 | (Australia) Phillip Shepherd | EH Holden | 25 October 2020 |
| Supersport 300 | 1:07.550 | (Australia) Isaac Simmonds | KTM RC 390 | 21 April 2024 |
| Excel Cup | 1:09.9997 | (Australia) Jackson Shaw | Hyundai Excel | 18 May 2024 |
| HQ Holden | 1:11.6103 | (Australia) Phil Ashlin | HQ Holden | 25 October 2020 |
| Boost Mobile Super Trucks | 1:12.2884 | (Australia) Paul Morris | Stadium Super Truck | 18 April 2021 |
| 250cc Production | 1:13.693 | (Australia) Lachlan Keogh | Kawasaki Ninja 250R | 5 September 2015 |

== See also ==
- List of events in Tasmania
