= 2005 Biante Model Cars Historic Touring Car Series =

The 2005 Biante Models Cars Historic Touring Car Series was an Australian motor racing competition for Group N cars. It was recognised by the Confederation of Australian Motor Sport as a National Series.

The series was open to:

- Group Na - Touring Cars pre 1958
- Group Nb - Production Touring Cars pre 1965
- Group Nc - Production Touring Cars 1965-1977

The series was won by Brad Tilley driving a Ford XY Falcon.

== Schedule ==
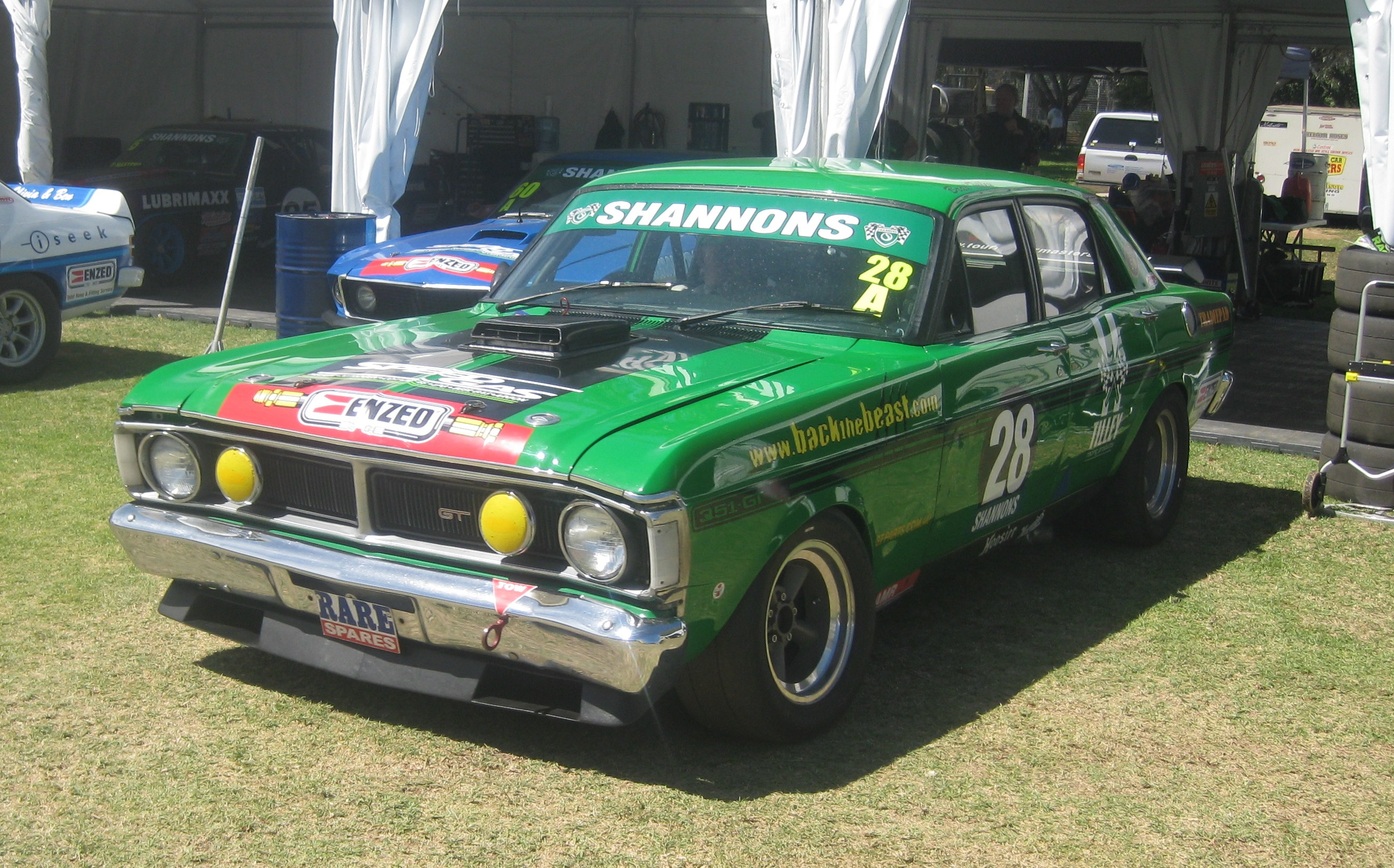
Brad Tilley won the series driving a Ford XY Falcon. The car is pictured in 2014.

The series was contested over six rounds with each round contested over three races.

Round	Circuit	State	Date
1	Adelaide Parklands Circuit	South Australia	17–20 March
2	Barbagallo Raceway, Wanneroo	Western Australia	6–8 May
3	Eastern Creek International Raceway	New South Wales	8–10 July
4	Mallala Motor Sport Park	South Australia	19–21 August
5	Mount Panorama, Bathurst	New South Wales	6–9 October
6	Eastern Creek International Raceway	New South Wales	30 October

== Points system ==
Outright series points were awarded at each race on the following basis:

Pos.	1st	2nd	3rd	4th	5th	6th	7th	8th	9th	10th	11th	12th	13th	14th	15th	16th	17th	18th	19th	20th
Points	20	17	15	13	12	11	10	9	8	7	6	5	4	3	2	1	1	1	1	1

Class points were awarded at each race on the following basis:

Pos.	1st	2nd	3rd	4th	5th	6th	7th	8th	9th	10th
Points	9	7	5	3	1	1	1	1	1	1

== Series standings ==
	Outright		
Position	Driver	Car	Points
1	Bradley Tilley	Ford XY Falcon	245
2	Steve Mason	Chevrolet Camaro SS	220
3	Christopher Stillwell	Ford Mustang	183
4	Trevor Talbot	Holden LJ Torana GTR XU-1	146
5	Jack Elsegood	Ford XY Falcon GTHO	145
6	Paul Stubber	Chevrolet Camaro	144
7	Garry Treloar	Chevrolet Camaro	143
8	Alastair MacLean	Holden LJ Torana GTR XU-1	112
9	Alf Bargwanna	Holden LJ Torana GTR XU-1	105
10	Darren Davies	Holden Monaro	99
	Group Nc A: Over 5101cc		
1	Bradley Tilley	Ford XY Falcon	95
2	Steve Mason	Chevrolet Camaro SS	77
3	Christopher Stillwell	Ford Mustang	61
	Group Nc B: 3501 - 5100cc		
1	Tony Hunter	Holden HQ Monaro	84
2	Les Walmsley	Chrysler VH Valiant Charger	70
3	Grahame Hill	Ford Mustang	65
	Group Nc C: 3001 - 3500cc		
1	Trevor Talbot	Holden LJ Torana GTR XU-1	112
2	Simon Phillips	Holden Torana GTR XU-1	77
3	Alastair MacLean	Holden LJ Torana GTR XU-1	75
	Group Nc D: 2001 - 3000cc		
1	Steve Land	Ford Capri	61
2	Harry Bargwanna	Ford Capri 3000 GT	50
3	Rory O'Neill	Porsche 911	26
	Group Nc E: 1501 - 2000cc		
1	Alan Lewis	Alfa Romeo 1750 GTV	51
2	Wes Anderson	Alfa Romeo 2000 GTV	44
3	John Kingcott	Ford Cortina GT Mark 2	42
	Group Nc F: 1101 - 1500 cc		
1	Chris Dubois	Ford Escort 1300 GT	52
2	Benjamin Tebbutt	Morris Cooper S	30
3	Matt McGrath	Morris Cooper S	27
	Group Nb A1: Over 4501cc		
1	Roger Oliver	Ford Falcon Rallye Sprint	132
2	Bill Meeke	Ford Falcon Rallye Sprint	48
3	John Bryant	Ford Falcon Rallye Sprint	23
	Group Nb A2: 3001 - 4500cc		
1	Paul Zazryn	Jaguar Mark II	27
2	Cameron Tilley	Chrysler Valiant	27
3	Peter Graham	Jaguar Mark II	9
	Group Nb B: 2601 - 3000cc		
1	Richard Fairlam	Holden EH	63
2	Kev Moore	Holden EH	18
3	-	-	-
	Group Nb E: 1301 - 1600cc		
1	Scott Fleming	Ford Cortina Lotus	59
2	Darren Holliday	Ford Cortina GT	44
3	Stuart Barnes	Ford Cortina GT Mark I & Ford Cortina Lotus	37
	Group Nb F: 1001 - 1300cc		
1	Lance Stannard	Morris Cooper S	63
2	Hamish Rhodes	Morris Cooper S	27
3	David Wheatley	Morris Cooper S	27

The above table shows only the top ten series placings outright and the top three placings in each class.
