= Group N Touring Cars =

Australian motor racing category

Group N Touring Cars is an Australian motor racing category for touring cars built before December 1972.

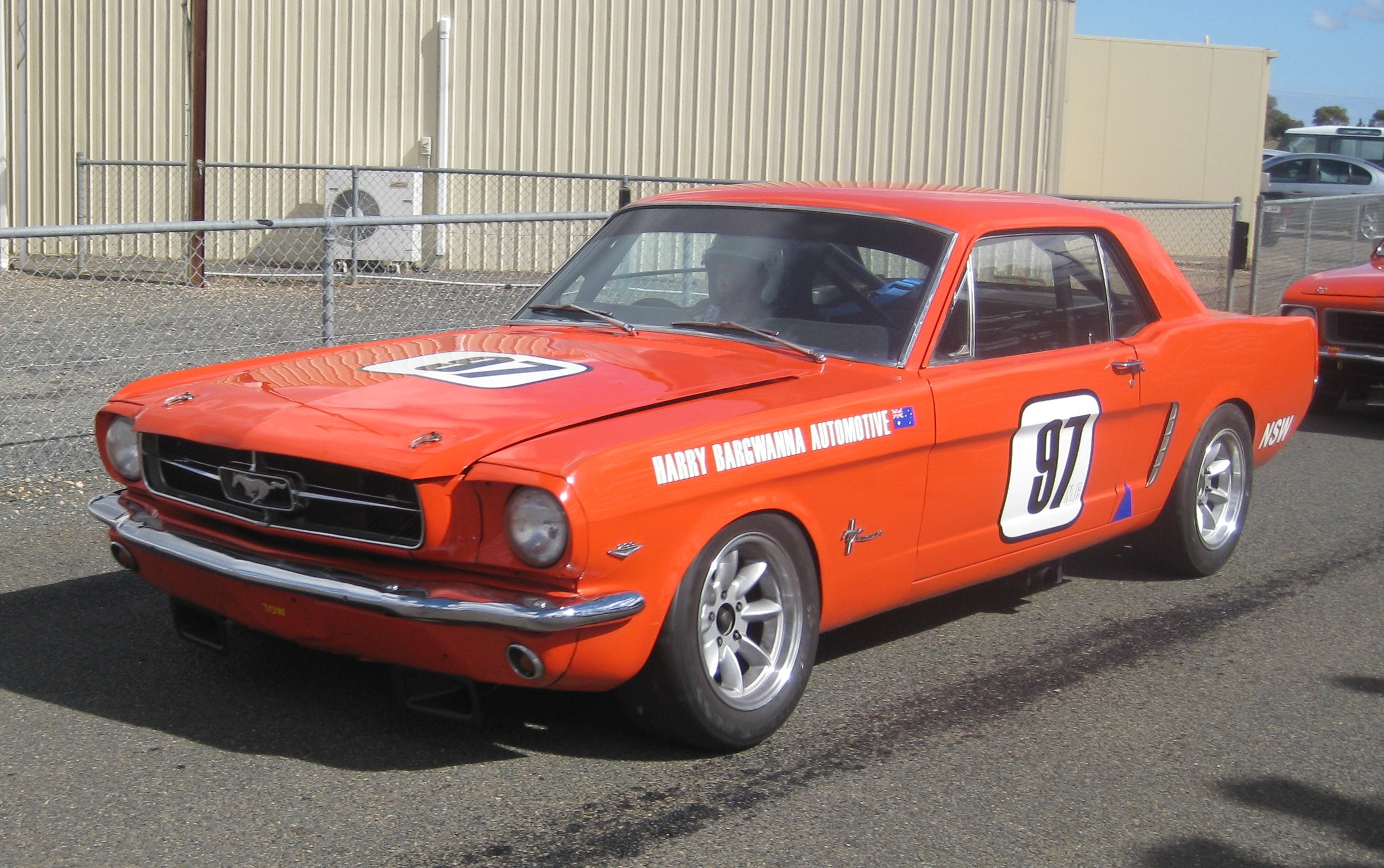
The Group N Ford Mustang of Harry Bargwanna at Mallala Motor Sport Park in 2011

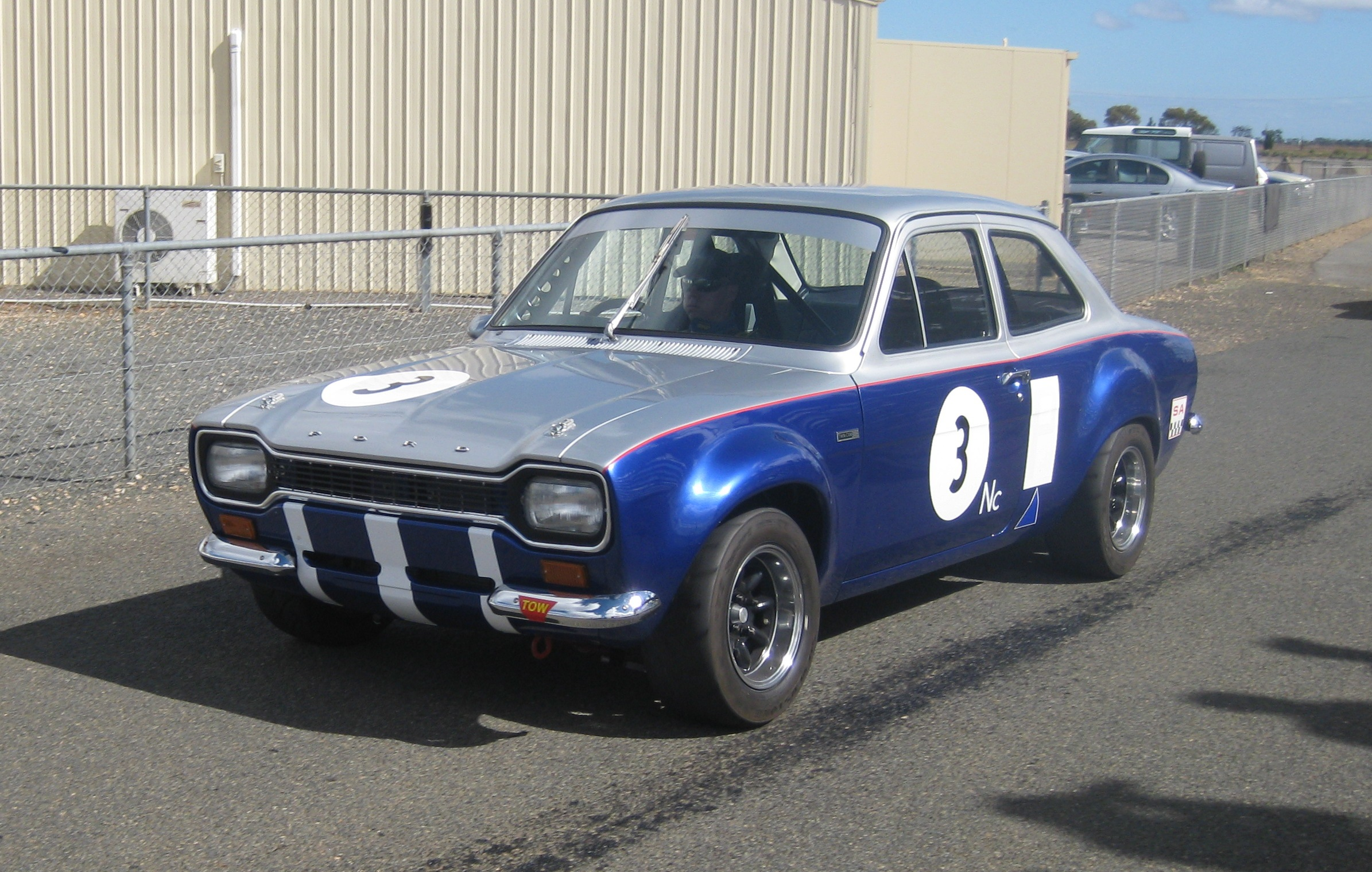
The Group N Ford Escort Twin Cam of Josh Axford at Mallala Motor Sport Park in 2011

The category was introduced in 1981 and was initially known as Group N (Appendix J) Saloon Cars (Pre 1965). Cars had to be series production type saloons with seating for four, manufactured prior to 31 December 1964, of which at least 100 had been produced. Mechanical modifications were permitted with the intention of emulating racing under the Appendix J regulations which were current in Australia until 31 December 1964.

The eligibility criteria were amended in 1995 to include cars built up to 31 December 1972.

Group N is currently divided into three classes.

- Group Na is for cars commercially available in Australia prior to 31 December 1957.
- Group Nb is for cars manufactured prior to 31 December 1964 of which 100 have been produced.
- Group Nc is for cars of a make and model which competed in Australia between 1 January 1965 and 31 December 1972 in either the Australian Touring Car Championship or in other races for Group C Improved Production Touring Cars.

Individual cars are not required to have a competition history in order to be eligible.

== Biante Model Cars Historic Touring Car Series ==
Group N cars raced in the Biante Model Cars Historic Touring Car Series.

Year	Winning driver	Car
2005	Brad Tilley	Ford XY Falcon
2006	Paul Stubber	Chevrolet Camaro

- See more at Touring Car Masters
