= 2025 Radical Cup Australia =

Australian motorsport championship season

The 2025 Radical Cup Australia is the fourth edition of Radical Cup Australia, a motor racing series for Radical SR3 sports cars run by the local distributors of Radical cars.

== Background ==
With the cessation of the SpeedSeries event series in 2024, Radical Cup Australia has aligned itself with the GT World Challenge Australia series. All five rounds of the series will be at events featuring the World Challenge Australia, and run by SRO Motorsports Group.

The series format is expected to remain similar to previous years, with a mixture of sprint and endurance races.

== Calendar ==
Round	Circuit	Dates	Map
1	(Victoria (state)) Phillip Island Grand Prix Circuit	4–6 April	2025 Radical Cup Australia is located in Australia
2	(New South Wales) Sydney Motorsport Park	2–4 May	2025 Radical Cup Australia is located in Australia
3	Queensland Raceway	30 May–June 1	2025 Radical Cup Australia is located in Australia
4	(Victoria (state)) Sandown Raceway	25–27 July	2025 Radical Cup Australia is located in Australia
5	(South Australia) The Bend Motorsport Park	5–7 September	2025 Radical Cup Australia is located in Australia

== Entries ==
Entrant	No.	Driver	Class	Rounds
(Australia) First Focus	1	(Australia) Peter Paddon	PA	1
(Australia) GFMS	4	(Australia) Warwrick Morris	AM	1
(Australia) Churche Racing	7	(Australia) Warwrick Churche	AM	1
(Australia) AN Racing	10	(Australia) Adam Naccarata	AM	1
(Australia) Volante Rosso Motorsport	15	(Australia) N Lory	PA	1
(Australia) Volante Rosso Motorsport	15	(Australia) J Hunt	PA	1
(Australia) Volante Rosso Motorsport	23	(Australia) Jim Hernandez	AM	1
(Australia) Volante Rosso Motorsport	47	(Australia) Peter Clare	AM	1
(Australia) Terry Cutts Racing	16	(Australia) Cooper Cutts	PA	1
(Australia) Liftoff Solutions	18	(Australia) Bradley Russell	AM	1
(Australia) Arise Racing	22	(Australia) Ruairidh Avern	PA	1
(Australia) Arise Racing	28	(Australia) Chris Reindler	PA	1
(Australia) Arise Racing	28	(Australia) Bryce Moore	PA	1
(Australia) Arise Racing	88	(Australia) Andrew Connor	AM	1
(Australia) Arise Racing	527	(Australia) Dave Allan	AM	1
(Australia) Arise Racing	527	(Australia) Mark Cirillo	AM	1
(Australia) Hughes Motorsport	32	(Australia) Sue Hughes	AM	1
GWR Australia	34	(Australia) Stephen Champion	AM	1
GWR Australia	222	(Australia) Ibby Hadeed	AM	1
(Australia) Ausnets	68	(Australia) Terry Knowles	AM	1
