= Sandown Raceway =

Motorsport track in Victoria, Australia

- National Circuit (1984–present)
- Location: Melbourne, Victoria, Australia
- Coordinates: 37°57′3″S 145°10′2″E
- FIA Grade: 3
- Owner: Melbourne Racing Club
- Opened: 11 March 1962; 64 years ago
- Major events: Current: Supercars Championship; Sandown 500 (1964–1965, 1968–1998, 2001–2007, 2012–2019, 2023–2024); Sandown SuperSprint (1965, 1970–1974, 1976–1989, 1991–1992, 1994–2002, 2008–2011, 2021–2022, 2025–present); Grand Finale (2001–2002); Trans-Am Australia (2022–present); Former: GT World Challenge Australia (1983–1984, 2007–2008, 2010–2011, 2014–2020, 2022, 2025); TCR Australia (2019, 2022–2024); S5000 (2019, 2021); World Sportscar Championship (1984, 1988); Australian Grand Prix (1964, 1968, 1972–1973, 1976, 1978); Tasman Series (1964–1975)

National Circuit (1984–present)
- Length: 3.104 km (1.929 mi)
- Turns: 13
- Race lap record: 1:04.5533 ( (Australia) John Martin, Ligier JS F3-S5000, 2019, S5000)

International Circuit (1984–2001)
- Length: 3.878 km (2.410 mi)
- Turns: 17
- Race lap record: 1:33.580 ( (France) Jean-Louis Schlesser, Sauber C9, 1988, Group C)

Original Circuit (1962–1984)
- Length: 3.100 km (1.926 mi)
- Turns: 8
- Race lap record: 0:59.600 ( (Australia) Alfredo Costanzo, McLaren M26, 1981, F5000)

Sandown Raceway is a motor racing circuit in Springvale, Victoria, Australia, approximately 25 km (16 mi) south east of the Melbourne central business district. Sandown is considered a power circuit with its "drag strip" front and back straights being 899 and 910 m (983 and 995 yd) long respectively.

== History ==
Sandown Racecourse was first built as a horse racing facility, dating back into the 19th century, but closed in the 1930s in a government run rationalisation program. Redevelopment began not long after World War II. A bitumen motor racing circuit was built around the outside of the proposed horse track (which was not completed until 1965) and was first opened in 1962 and held the race which became the Sandown 500 for the first time in 1964. The circuit hosted its first Australian Touring Car Championship race in 1965.

== Motor racing ==
The opening meeting, held on 11 and 12 March 1962, featured the 1962 Sandown International Cup, which was contested by world-famous international drivers including Jack Brabham, Jim Clark, Stirling Moss, Bruce McLaren and John Surtees. A second Sandown International Cup was held in 1963, the two races serving as the forerunners of the Sandown round of the annual Tasman Series from 1964 to 1975. Throughout the 1960s and 1970s the race meetings continued to attract international stars along with the best of Australia's drivers.

Australia's traditional Holden/Ford rivalry really surfaced at the track in the late 1960s and through the 1970s with drivers such as Norm Beechey, Ian Geoghegan, Allan Moffat, Bob Jane, Colin Bond and Peter Brock and continues to the present day.

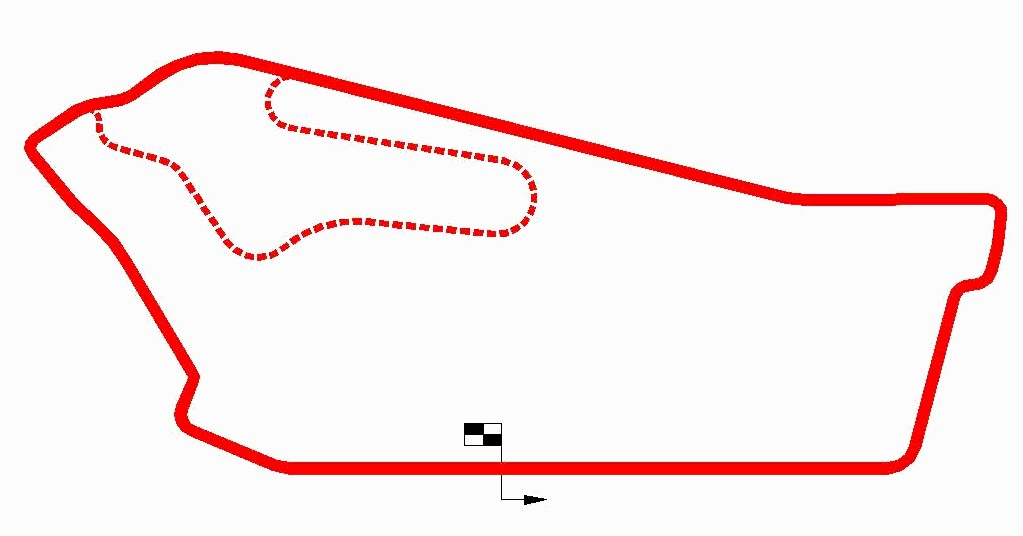
The layout maps shows both the national circuit and abandoned international circuit layouts

In 1984, the track was extended to 3.878 km (2.410 mi) to comply with FIA regulations for minimum track length for World Championship events, the ultimate goal being to host the Formula One World Championship, though ultimately that went to Adelaide.

Along with the circuit changes, some AUD$600,000 had been spent relocating the pits from its original place between what was turns one and two (now turns one and four) to its now permanent place coming onto the main straight. The new international standard pits included pit bays and lock-up garages for over 40 cars.

In 1989, the largely unpopular, 3.878 km (2.410 mi) International Circuit (often referred to by Australian television commentators as the "Village Grand Prix" due to how slow the infield section was compared to the rest of the circuit) was abandoned and the track reverted to 3.104 km (1.929 mi), though not by using the original 8 turn layout, but a modified 13 turn course. This was achieved by simply bypassing the largely unpopular tight and twisty infield section that had been in use since 1984 and using only the re-configured National (outer) Circuit. The effect was also to bring the cars closer to the spectator area on the outside of the esses to bring back spectators to the area. The esses at the end of the back straight was a popular spectator area during the 1970s and 1980s with several converted double-decker buses frequenting race meetings.

While the extension to the circuit had been necessary to lift Sandown's minimum length to 3.9 km, unfortunately the circuit promotors, the Light Car Club of Australia, were restricted by not being able to expand beyond the property boundary which only left going infield, which itself met with restrictions from the Melbourne Racing Club who administered the Sandown horse race course who naturally wanted minimal disruption to their horse racing track. The 800 metre extension was not overly popular with spectators (there was no spectator access to the infield) nor the racers, especially the touring car teams who in that era (1984–1988) found the long runs in 2nd gear through that section were hard on drivelines and transmissions.

Sandown continued to host both the 500 kilometre race and a sprint round of the championship, the Sandown Challenge, throughout the majority of the 1970s, 1980s and 1990s. In 2001 and 2002, the circuit hosted the Grand Finale as the closing round of the season. When the Sandown 500 returned in 2003, the sprint round was removed from the calendar and Sandown no longer hosts two major V8 Supercars events per year.

The infield section was still used for motorcycle racing at the track until about 2001 as the high speed esses (turns 6–9) at the end of the back straight were deemed too dangerous for the bikes at high speed (the entry speed off the straight was close to 200 km/h (120 mph) with very little runoff area between the track and the outside fence. Using the infield section not only bypassed the esses but slowed the bikes down and allowed them to continue using the circuit for the series such as the Australian Superbike Championship.

In late 2007 the Melbourne Racing Club, owner of the venue, brought the management of the motor circuit in house. As part of securing the future of motorsport at the venue Sandown's Manager Wade Calderwood negotiated a long-term deal with V8 Supercars. Under this deal the MRC invested significant funds as part of a 3-year upgrade to the pits and circuit safety.

Under the local Council permit, Sandown Raceway is limited to running five motorsport events per year, at no louder than 95 decibels. Currently these events include the Sandown 500, Historic Sandown, Shannons Nationals and two Victorian State Race Series events.

The long-term future of this historic circuit is unclear as the owners of Sandown Park want to have it rezoned so that they can sell it to a property developer who would then demolish the venue and turn it into high density housing.

== Sandown 500 ==
The circuit was home to the Sandown 500 which was first held in 1964 through to 2007, with a return to the calendar from 2012. Since 2025 the format has changed to be two 250 kilometre races all contested by the one driver as opposed to the previous format of one 500 kilometre race contested by two drivers.

== V8 Supercars ==
With the establishment of V8 Supercars in 1997, the Sandown 500 event remained as part of its calendar for that year and 1998. Sandown became a sprint round of the V8 Supercars Championship Series for 1999 and 2000, then as three 150 km races with pit stops in 2001 and a 150 km race on the Saturday and 300 km race on the Sunday in 2002. The event was won by Todd Kelly in 2001 and by Marcos Ambrose in 2002. The 500 km format returned in 2003.

For the 2008 season, the 500 kilometres endurance race was moved to the Phillip Island circuit. Sandown remained on the calendar as a venue, but hosted a regular multiple sprint race format event earlier in the year. The event returned to its single 500 kilometres roots in September 2012 as an enduro precursor to the Bathurst 1000, with the inaugural Dick Smith Sandown 500 won by the Holden Commodore Team Vodafone pairing of Craig Lowndes and Warren Luff.

== World Sportscar Championship ==
On 2 December 1984, Sandown held the last round of the 1984 World Endurance Championship. The race, known as the Sandown 1000, was won by Stefan Bellof and Derek Bell in their Rothmans Porsche 956. This race was the first FIA World Championship road racing motor racing event to be held in Australia. As the race name suggests, the race distance was to be 1,000 km (620 mi) long. However, under WSC rules, with the exception of the 24 Hours of Le Mans (and in certain years, the 24 Hours of Daytona), races had a time limit of 6 hours. The six-hour mark was reached when the Bellof/Bell Porsche had run only 206 laps (803.4 km (499.2 mi)), thus the race was declared at the time limit some 51 laps short of the 1000 km distance.

The next (and only other) FIA World Sportscar Championship race held in Australia was also held at Sandown on 20 November 1988. This was the 1988 360 km of Sandown Park, the final round of the 1988 World Sports-Prototype Championship, which was won by Jean-Louis Schlesser and Jochen Mass driving their Sauber Mercedes C9. This race would prove to be the final top level motor race on the 3.878 km (2.410 mi) International Circuit, with Schlesser setting the circuit's outright lap record with a time of 1:33.580. Schlesser also set the fastest ever recorded lap time of the International circuit during qualifying for the race when he piloted his C9 around in a time of 1:28.620.

== Historic Sandown ==
Historic Sandown is an annual event held at the circuit on the first weekend of November. Promoted by the VHRR (Victorian Historic Racing Register) and run by the MG Car Club of Victoria, it is a highly successful event which in 2009 attracted a record 400+ historic racing cars including touring cars, MG racers and Formula Fords and was also headlined by the Biante Touring Car Masters.

== Cycling Victoria ==
Several Melbourne cycling clubs hold regular races over the summer season.

== Athletics Victoria ==
Annually, Athletics Victoria hold a road race (sometimes a team relay) as a part of the AV Cross Country season.

== Australian Grand Prix ==
Sandown Raceway has held the Australian Grand Prix on six occasions, the last being in 1978, seven years before the event became part of the FIA Formula One World Championship in 1985. Two World Drivers' Champions were winners of the AGP at Sandown, Jack Brabham in 1964 and the late Jim Clark in 1968, with Clark's winning margin being only 0.1 seconds from the Ferrari of New Zealand's Chris Amon being one of the closest finishes in the race's history. John Goss' 1976 victory saw him become the first, and so far only winner of both the Australian Grand Prix and the Bathurst 1000 touring car race.

The winners of the Australian Grands Prix held at Sandown Raceway are:

Year	Driver	Car	Entrant
Tasman Series
1964	(Australia) Jack Brabham	Brabham BT7A	Ecurie Vitesse
1968	(United Kingdom) Jim Clark	Lotus 49T	Gold Leaf Team Lotus
1972	(New Zealand) Graham McRae	Leda GM1	Graham McRae
Australian Formula 1 (Formula 5000 + 2-litre) / Australian Formula 2
1973	(New Zealand) Graham McRae	McRae GM2	Graham McRae
1976	(Australia) John Goss	Matich A53	John Goss Racing
Australian Formula 1 (Formula 5000)
1978	(New Zealand) Graham McRae	McRae GM3	Thomson Motor Auctions

Special Guest at the 1978 Australian Grand Prix, the 50th anniversary of the event (and the final time it would be held at Sandown), was Argentina's five-time Formula One World Drivers' Champion, the legendary Juan Manuel Fangio. Following the race Fangio, Australia's own three-time World Champion Jack Brabham, Bob Jane and former racer turned Holden dealer Bill Patterson, staged a spirited three-lap demonstration/race. Fangio and Brabham cleared out and swapped the lead many times. Fangio was driving a Mercedes-Benz W196 that he raced in 1954 and 1955, while Brabham (not yet Sir Jack) drove the Repco-Brabham V8 powered Brabham BT19 in which he won the 1966 Formula One World Championship to become the first and only person to win the Drivers' championship in a car of his own design and build. Brabham 'won' the demonstration, just ahead of Fangio, with Patterson (driving a Cooper) and Jane (driving a Maserati) some distance behind in 3rd and 4th.

== Upgrades ==
Sandown was repaved and received many new safety features in 2013 in accordance with new FIA rules. More tyre barriers were added, and new catch fencing was also added during big events like Historic Sandown and the Wilson Security 500. The main grandstand was also upgraded to feature a new bar and food complex. Along with the grandstand, the pits were also upgraded. Following a spate of major accidents at the end of the back straight (particularly at turn 6) between 2010 and 2017, the run-off area was also extended in early 2019.

== Events ==
Current

- November: Supercars Championship Sandown 500, GT4 Australia Series GT Festival Sandown, Australian National Trans-Am Series, Porsche Sprint Challenge Australia, GR Cup

Former

- Aussie Racing Cars (2003–2007, 2022, 2025)
- Australian Grand Prix (1964, 1968, 1972–1973, 1976, 1978)
- Australian GT Production Car Championship (1999–2002)
- Australian Mini Challenge (2008–2009)
- Australian motorcycle Grand Prix (1976)
- Australian Nations Cup Championship (2001, 2004)
- Australian Performance Car Championship (2001, 2004)
- Australian Production Car Series (2004, 2007—2015, 2018–2019, 2022–2024)
- Australian Sports Car Championship (1969, 1973, 1980–1981, 1983, 1986–1988)
- Formula 4 Australian Championship (2015–2017)
- GT World Challenge Australia (1983–1984, 2007–2008, 2010–2011, 2014–2020, 2022, 2025)
- Porsche Carrera Cup Australia Championship (2003–2008, 2014–2017, 2020–2024)
- S5000 Australian Drivers' Championship (2019, 2021)
- Supercars Championship
  - Grand Finale (2001–2002)
  - Sandown 500 (1964–1965, 1968–1998, 2001–2007, 2012–2019, 2023–2024)
- SuperUtes Series (2018, 2023, 2025)
- Tasman Series (1964–1975)
- TCR Australia (2019, 2022–2024)
- Touring Car Masters (2007, 2009–2014, 2016–2019, 2022, 2024–2025)
- V8 Ute Racing Series (2001, 2004–2005, 2009, 2011, 2013–2015)
- World Sportscar Championship (1984, 1988)

== Lap records ==
As of November 2026, the fastest official race lap records at Sandown Raceway are listed as:

Class	Time	Driver	Vehicle	Date
National Circuit (1984–present): 3.104 km (1.929 mi)
S5000	1:04.5533	(Australia) John Martin	Ligier JS F3-S5000	22 September 2019
Formula 5000	1:05.7669	(Australia) Tom Tweedie	Chevron B24/28 Chevrolet	14 September 2013
Sports Sedans	1:07.4451	(Australia) Thomas Randle	Saab 9-3	19 February 2023
Formula 3	1:07.4736	(Australia) Simon Hodge	Mygale M11	29 March 2014
GT3	1:07.9639	(Australia) Fraser Ross	McLaren 720S GT3	21 September 2019
Radical Cup	1:07.9933	(Australia) Karl Reindler	Radical SR8	28 March 2015
Supercars Championship	1:08.2440	(New Zealand) Shane van Gisbergen	Holden Commodore ZB	10 November 2019
Formula Holden	1:08.350	(New Zealand) Simon Wills	Reynard 94D	27 June 1999
Porsche Carrera Cup	1:08.9531	(Australia) Harri Jones	Porsche 911 (992 I) GT3 Cup	15 September 2024
Super2 Series	1:09.3247	(Australia) Will Brown	Holden VF Commodore	10 November 2019
V8 Touring Car National Series	1:10.6267	(Australia) Brad Vaughan	Ford FG Falcon	20 August 2022
Trans-Am Australia	1:11.4070	(Australia) Todd Hazelwood	Ford Mustang Trans-Am	8 November 2026
Lamborghini Super Trofeo	1:11.656	(Australia) Ryan Millier	Lamborghini Huracán LP 620-2 Super Trofeo EVO	9 November 2019
Formula 4	1:11.9359	(Australia) Brodie Norris	Mygale M14-F4	10 September 2023
Nations Cup	1:12.2153	(Australia) Nathan Pretty	Holden Monaro 427C	16 May 2004
Group A / Group C Sports Car	1:12.5713	(Australia) John Briggs	Veskanda C1	11 November 2007
Toyota Racing Series	1:13.3162	(Australia) Christopher Slusarski	Tatuus FT-50	10 February 2024
GT4	1:13.5371	(Australia) Jarrod Hughes	Mercedes-AMG GT4	27 July 2025
Touring Car Masters	1:14.0859	(Australia) Aaron Seton	Ford Mustang Boss	9 November 2019
Formula 2	1:14.470	(Australia) Barry Ward	Reynard 91D	19 May 1991
TCR Touring Car	1:14.6180	(Australia) Jordan Cox	Alfa Romeo Giulietta Veloce TCR	22 September 2019
Formula Ford	1:14.6202	(Australia) Chaz Mostert	Spectrum 011B	2 August 2009
Group A	1:14.810	(Australia) John Bowe	Ford Sierra RS500	8 March 1992
Mustang Cup	1:15.4809	(Australia) Oliver Wickham	Ford Mustang Dark Horse R	1 November 2026
Production Cars	1:16.2454	(Australia) Jayden Ojeda	BMW M4	10 February 2024
MG Cars	1:16.330	(Australia) Glen Taylor	MGB GT V8	8 November 2015
Formula Ford 1600	1:18.390	(Australia) Luke Ellery	Spectrum 010	23 May 2010
Group C Touring Car	1:18.8464	(Australia) Milton Seferis	Holden VH Commodore SS	10 November 2012
Superkart	1:19.690	(Australia) Scott Ellis	Anderson Maverick-Safe	1 November 2005
Aussie Racing Cars	1:19.9061	(Australia) Joel Heinrich	Ford Mustang-Yamaha	26 July 2025
SuperUtes Series	1:20.6203	(Australia) Adam Marjoram	Isuzu D-Max (RG)	16 November 2025
Commodore Cup	1:22.170	(Australia) Geoff Emery	Holden VS Commodore	24 October 2010
GR Cup	1:23.2700	(New Zealand) Brock Stinson	Toyota GR86	8 November 2026
Saloon Cars	1:23.6271	(Australia) Brad Vaughan	Ford Falcon AU	19 February 2023
Porsche 944	1:24.0011	(Australia) Cameron Beller	Porsche 944	19 July 2015
Formula Vee 1600	1:26.920	(Australia) Ben Porter	Checkmate JP02	25 July 2010
Formula Vee 1192	1:31.330	(Australia) Jason Kerr	Sabre 01	31 July 2004
HQ Holdens	1:34.710	(Australia) John Alessi	Holden HQ	19 July 2003
Truck racing	1:38.370	(Australia) Rodney Crick	Volvo N12	17 April 1994
International Circuit (1984–2001): 3.878 km (2.410 mi)
Group C Sports Car	1:33.580	(France) Jean-Louis Schlesser	Sauber C9 Mercedes-Benz	20 November 1988
Formula Mondial	1:36.900	(Australia) John Bowe	Ralt RT4	9 September 1984
Australian Formula 2	1:40.200	(Australia) Arthur Abrahams	Cheetah Mk 8	14 September 1986
Australian GT	1:43.300	(Australia) Bryan Thompson	Mercedes-Benz 450 SLC Chevrolet Turbo	9 September 1984
Group A Touring Car (2501-6000cc)	1:47.650	(Australia) John Bowe	Ford Sierra RS500	11 September 1988
Group C Touring Car	1:48.300	(Australia) Allan Grice	Holden VK Commodore SS	9 September 1984
Group A Touring Car (1601-2500cc)	1:50.800	(Australia) George Fury	Nissan Skyline DR30 RS	7 June 1987
Group A Touring Car (Up to 1600cc)	1:57.400	(Australia) John Smith	Toyota Corolla GT AE86	7 June 1987
Original Circuit (1962–1984): 3.100 km (1.926 mi)
Formula 5000	0:59.600	(Australia) Alfredo Costanzo	McLaren M26	September 1981
Formula Tasman	1:04.500	(New Zealand) Chris Amon	Dino 246T	16 February 1969
Formula Mondial	1:05.200	(Australia) Alfredo Costanzo	Tiga FA81	11 September 1983
Group A Sports Car (Over 3 Litre)	1:05.400	(Australia) Peter Hopwood	Kaditcha Chevrolet	20 February 1983
Group 5	1:06.500	(New Zealand) Jim Richards	BMW 318i Turbo	17 April 1983
Formula 2	1:07.900	(Australia) John Bowe (Note: Both drivers took the same lap time independently.) (Australia) Russell Norden	Elfin GE Two-25; March 793 Volkswagen	5 July 1981
Formula One	1:08.100	(United Kingdom) Jackie Stewart	BRM P261	27 February 1966
Group C Touring Car (over 3 Litre)	1:10.800	(Australia) Peter Brock	Holden VH Commodore SS	18 February 1984
Group C Touring Car (under 3 Litre)	1:13.400	(Australia) George Fury	Nissan Bluebird turbo	20 February 1983
Group A Sports Car (Under 3 Litre)	1:14.800	(Australia) Ray Hanger	Rennmax Ford	20 February 1983
