= 2025 Porsche Carrera Cup Australia =

Racing series using Prosche 911 GT3 cars

The 2025 Porsche Carrera Cup Australia (commercially titled 2025 Paynter Dixon Carrera Cup Australia) was a national motor racing series conducted using spec Porsche 911 (992) GT3 Cup cars. The series which was the twenty-first running of Porsche Carrera Cup Australia was one of the main support categories for the Supercars Championship, supporting eight of the thirteen events in 2025. It was sanctioned by Motorsport Australia.

The series was won by Dylan O'Keeffe, and the Pro-Am championship was won by Rodney Jane.

== Calendar ==
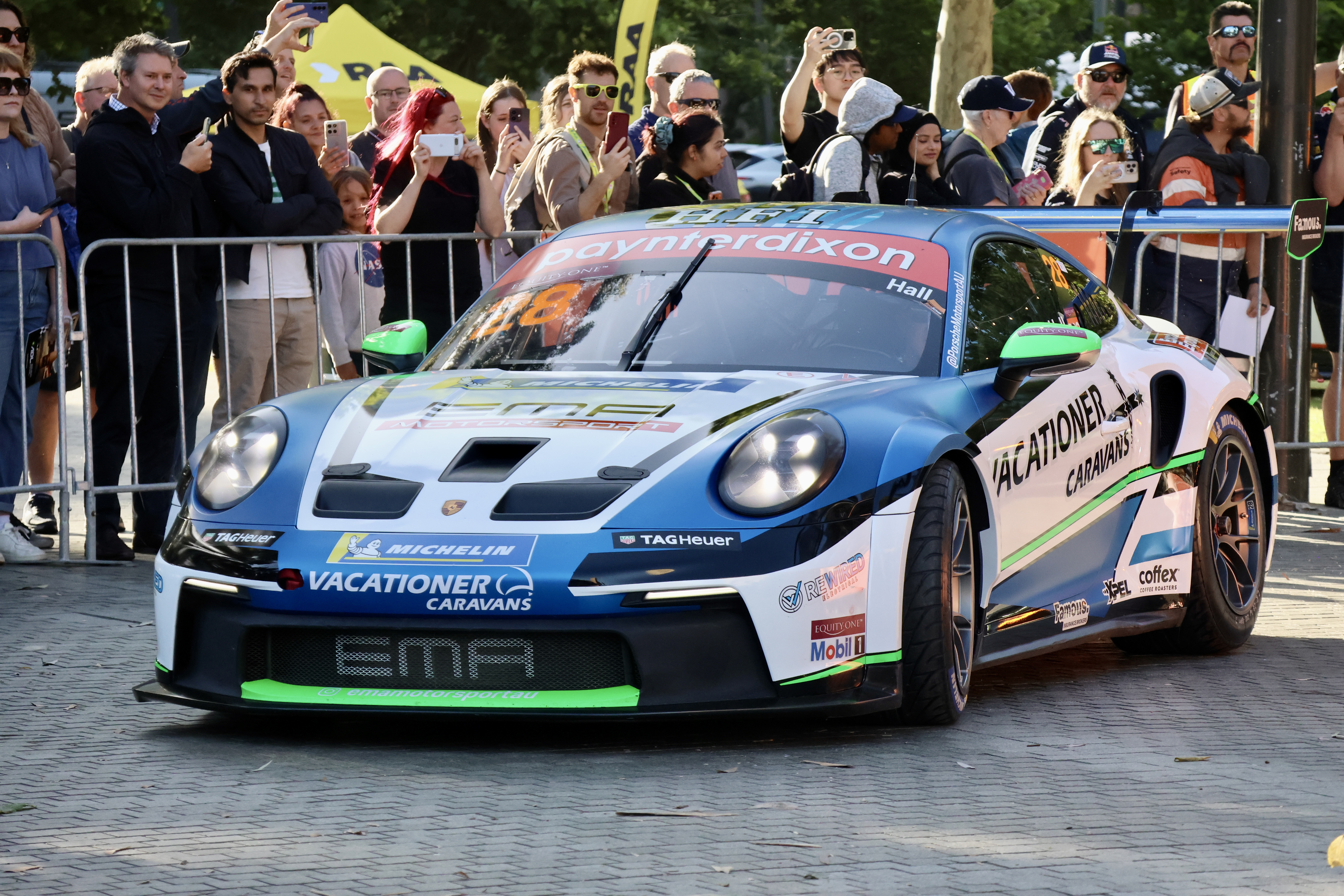
Bayley Hall placed fourth driving for EMA Motorsport

The 2025 calendar was revealed on 25 October 2024.

Event	Circuit	Dates	Supporting
1	(New South Wales) Sydney Motorsport Park	21–23 February	Supercars Championship
2	(Victoria (state)) Albert Park Circuit	13–15 March	Formula One World Championship; Supercars Championship
3	(Northern Territory) Hidden Valley Raceway	20–22 June	Supercars Championship
4	Queensland Raceway	8–10 August	Supercars Championship
5	(South Australia) The Bend Motorsport Park	12–14 September	Supercars Championship
6	(New South Wales) Mount Panorama Circuit	9–12 October	Supercars Championship
7	(Queensland) Surfers Paradise Street Circuit	24–26 October	Supercars Championship
8	(South Australia) Adelaide Street Circuit	27–30 November	Supercars Championship

== Teams and drivers ==
Entrant	No.	Driver	Class	Rounds
(Australia) Jones Motorsport	1	(Australia) Harri Jones	P	All
(Australia) Jones Motorsport	26	(Australia) Tom Taplin	P	8
(Australia) TekworkX Motorsport	2	(Australia) David Russell	P	All
(Australia) TekworkX Motorsport	81	(Australia) Tom McLennan	P	1–7
(Australia) TekworkX Motorsport	99	(Finland) Marcus Amand	P	4–7
(Australia) TekworkX Motorsport	702	(Australia) Danny Stutterd	PA	1
(New Zealand) EBM	3	(Australia) Oscar Targett	P	1–7
(New Zealand) EBM	20	(Australia) Adrian Flack	PA	1–2
(New Zealand) EBM	66	(New Zealand) Marco Giltrap	P	All
(New Zealand) EBM	911	(Australia) Glen Wood	P	All
(New Zealand) EBM	992	(Australia) Dale Wood	P	All
(Australia) Melbourne Performance Centre	4	(Australia) Stephen Grove	PA	5–8
(Australia) Melbourne Performance Centre	9	(Australia) Marc Cini	PA	1–2, 5–8
(Australia) Melbourne Performance Centre	16	(Australia) Hamish Fitzsimmons	P	All
(Australia) DNA Autosport	5	(Australia) Jacque Jargo	PA	1–2, 7
(New Zealand) McElrea Racing	7	(Australia) Caleb Sumich	P	1–7
(New Zealand) McElrea Racing	15	(New Zealand) Clay Osborne	P	All
(New Zealand) McElrea Racing	23	(Australia) Lockie Bloxsom	P	All
(New Zealand) McElrea Racing	78	(Australia) Aaron Love	P	8
(New Zealand) McElrea Racing	95	(Australia) Brett Boulton	PA	1–7
(Australia) RAM Motorsport	11	(Australia) Jackson Walls	P	2–3
(Australia) RAM Motorsport	14	(Australia) Matthew Belford	PA	All
(Australia) RAM Motorsport	22	(Australia) Dean Cook	PA	2, 5, 7–8
(Australia) RAM Motorsport	35	(South Africa) Indiran Padayachee	PA	2, 5–6
(Australia) RAM Motorsport	88	(Australia) Dylan O'Keeffe	P	1–7
(Australia) EMA Motorsport	13	(Australia) Sam Shahin	PA	1–2, 4–6
(Australia) EMA Motorsport	28	(Australia) Bayley Hall	P	All
(Australia) EMA Motorsport	90	(Netherlands) Robert de Haan	P	8
(Australia) EMA Motorsport	91	(France) Alessandro Ghiretti	P	2
(Australia) Sonic Motor Racing Services	19	(Australia) Jake Santalucia	P	8
(Australia) Sonic Motor Racing Services	77	(Australia) Rodney Jane	PA	All
(Australia) Sonic Motor Racing Services	777	(Australia) Marcos Flack	P	All
(Australia) Sonic Motor Racing Services	999	(Australia) Angelo Mouzouris	P	All
(Australia) MVA Racing	72	(Australia) Max Vidau	P	1–2, 5–6, 8
(Australia) VCM Performance	76	(Australia) Christian Pancione	P	5
(Australia) Ashley Seward Motorsport	85	(Australia) Matt Slavin	PA	All
(Australia) Scott Taylor Motorsport	222	(Australia) Scott Taylor	PA	4, 6
(Australia) Wall Racing	321	(China) Li Xuanyu	P	8

Icon	Class
P	Pro Cup
PA	Pro-Am Cup
	Guest Starter

== Results ==
Round		Circuit	Pole position	Fastest lap	Overall winner	Winning team	Pro-Am Winner
1	R1	(New South Wales) Sydney Motorsport Park	(Australia) Harri Jones	(Australia) Harri Jones	(Australia) Harri Jones	(Australia) Jones Motorsport	(Australia) Jacque Jargo
1	R2	(New South Wales) Sydney Motorsport Park		(Australia) Harri Jones	(Australia) Harri Jones	(Australia) Jones Motorsport	(Australia) Adrian Flack
1	R3	(New South Wales) Sydney Motorsport Park		(Australia) Harri Jones	(Australia) Harri Jones	(Australia) Jones Motorsport	(Australia) Matt Slavin
2	R1	(Victoria (state)) Albert Park Circuit	(Australia) Harri Jones	(France) Alessandro Ghiretti	(Australia) Harri Jones	(Australia) Jones Motorsport	(Australia) Sam Shahin
2	R2	(Victoria (state)) Albert Park Circuit		(Australia) Harri Jones	(Australia) Jackson Walls	(Australia) RAM Motorsport	(Australia) Rodney Jane
2	R3	(Victoria (state)) Albert Park Circuit		(Australia) Bayley Hall	(France) Alessandro Ghiretti	(Australia) EMA Motorsport	(Australia) Adrian Flack
3	R1	(Northern Territory) Hidden Valley Raceway	(Australia) Dylan O'Keeffe	(Australia) Harri Jones	(Australia) Dylan O'Keeffe	(Australia) RAM Motorsport	(Australia) Matt Slavin
3	R2	(Northern Territory) Hidden Valley Raceway		(Australia) Angelo Mouzouris	(Australia) Dylan O'Keeffe	(Australia) RAM Motorsport	(Australia) Matthew Belford
3	R3	(Northern Territory) Hidden Valley Raceway		(Australia) Harri Jones	(Australia) Dylan O'Keeffe	(Australia) RAM Motorsport	(Australia) Matthew Belford
4	R1	Queensland Raceway	(Australia) Harri Jones	(Australia) Harri Jones	(Australia) Harri Jones	(Australia) Jones Motorsport	(Australia) Sam Shahin
4	R2	Queensland Raceway		(Australia) Harri Jones	(Australia) Harri Jones	(Australia) Jones Motorsport	(Australia) Sam Shahin
4	R3	Queensland Raceway		(Australia) Harri Jones	(Australia) Harri Jones	(Australia) Jones Motorsport	(Australia) Sam Shahin
5	R1	(South Australia) The Bend Motorsport Park	(Australia) Harri Jones	(Finland) Marcus Amand	(Australia) Harri Jones	(Australia) Jones Motorsport	(Australia) Matthew Belford
5	R2	(South Australia) The Bend Motorsport Park		(Australia) Harri Jones	(Australia) Harri Jones	(Australia) Jones Motorsport	(Australia) Brett Bolton
5	R3	(South Australia) The Bend Motorsport Park		(Australia) Harri Jones	(Finland) Marcus Amand	(Australia) TekworkX Motorsport	(Australia) Matthew Belford
6	R1	(New South Wales) Mount Panorama Circuit	(Finland) Marcus Amand	(Australia) Harri Jones	(Australia) David Russell	(Australia) TekworkX Motorsport	(Australia) Matthew Belford
6	R2	(New South Wales) Mount Panorama Circuit		(Australia) Dale Wood	(Australia) David Russell	(Australia) TekworkX Motorsport	(Australia) Matthew Belford
6	R3	(New South Wales) Mount Panorama Circuit		(Australia) Dylan O'Keeffe	(Australia) David Russell	(Australia) TekworkX Motorsport	(Australia) Matt Slavin
7	R1	(Queensland) Surfers Paradise Street Circuit	(Australia) Marcos Flack	Race abandoned following 'significant crash'			
7	R2	(Queensland) Surfers Paradise Street Circuit		(Australia) Bayley Hall	(Australia) Bayley Hall	(Australia) EMA Motorsport	(Australia) Matthew Belford
7	R3	(Queensland) Surfers Paradise Street Circuit		(Australia) Harri Jones	(Australia) Bayley Hall	(Australia) EMA Motorsport	(Australia) Matthew Belford
8	R1	(South Australia) Adelaide Street Circuit	(Netherlands) Robert de Haan	(Australia) Max Vidau	(Australia) Max Vidau	(Australia) MVA Racing	(Australia) Matthew Belford
8	R2	(South Australia) Adelaide Street Circuit		(Australia) Glen Wood	(Australia) Glen Wood	(New Zealand) EBM	(Australia) Rodney Jane
8	R3	(South Australia) Adelaide Street Circuit		(Australia) Bayley Hall	(Australia) Aaron Love	(New Zealand) McElrea Racing	(Australia) Matthew Belford

== Championship standings ==
=== Pro ===
Pos.	Driver	SMP (New South Wales)			MEL (Victoria (state))			HID (Northern Territory)			QLD (Queensland)			BEN (South Australia)			BAT (New South Wales)			SUR (Queensland)			ADE (South Australia)			Points
Pos.	Driver	R1	R2	R3	R1	R2	R3	R1	R2	R3	R1	R2	R3	R1	R2	R3	R1	R2	R3	R1	R2	R3	R1	R2	R3	Points
1	(Australia) Dylan O'Keeffe	3	3	3	2	5	2	**1**	1	1	3	7	5	3	5	3	2	2	2	C	Ret	10	5	4	7	1024
2	(Australia) Harri Jones	**1**	1	1	**1**	7	6	2	3	2	**1**	1	1	**1**	1	2	11	10	Ret	C	7	6	7	13	5	981
3	(Australia) David Russell	7	8	8	8	8	5	3	11	4	2	4	3	6	9	4	1	1	1	C	4	3	2	8	9	869
4	(Australia) Bayley Hall	2	4	2	10	2	12	5	2	3	4	9	22	9	3	5	8	6	15	C	1	1	Ret	21	11	814
5	(Australia) Angelo Mouzouris	16	7	11	9	9	13	6	8	7	13	5	9	7	8	6	13	14	7	C	3	5	11	3	3	662
6	(Australia) Dale Wood	5	6	6	14	13	7	4	Ret	15	6	2	4	27	4	Ret	6	5	5	C	8	8	4	6	4	656
7	(Australia) Marcos Flack	8	12	9	5	3	4	13	6	6	8	12	6	8	15	17	23	11	14	**C**	2	2	8	5	6	641
8	(Australia) Glen Wood	9	14	10	15	Ret	15	7	5	5	10	11	15	14	12	9	4	8	6	C	13	11	13	1	2	565
9	(New Zealand) Clay Osbourne	10	15	12	4	4	8	14	12	11	7	8	7	13	7	Ret	7	7	17	C	6	7	3	14	10	547
10	(New Zealand) Marco Giltrap	6	5	5	13	21	10	11	9	9	14	14	12	10	10	11	3	3	3	C	9	9	Ret	DNS	DNS	509
11	(Australia) Hamish Fitzsimmons	12	25	14	11	10	9	10	15	16	12	6	10	11	16	13	5	4	4	C	DNS	DNS	10	10	8	457
12	(Australia) Lockie Bloxsom	21	13	15	16	11	11	9	13	12	9	13	8	4	14	7	9	15	11	C	10	12	Ret	7	13	455
13	(Australia) Oscar Targett	4	2	4	25	16	14	12	7	8	16	22	13	12	6	8	26	9	10	C	DNS	DNS				414
14	(Australia) Caleb Sumich	11	9	7	6	Ret	16	15	14	14	11	10	11	15	18	Ret	12	Ret	12	C	DNS	DNS				271
15	(Australia) Max Vidau	13	10	13	27	Ret	18							17	11	10	19	12	9				1	9	12	251
16	(Australia) Jackson Walls				3	1	3	8	4	10													DNS	DNS	DNS	244
17	(Australia) Tom McLennan	Ret	11	18	12	12	17	16	10	13	15	15	14	16	17	14	10	13	13	C	DNS	DNS				242
18	(France) Alessandro Ghiretti				7	6	1																			121
Guest drivers ineligible for points
	(Finland) Marcus Amand										5	3	2	2	2	1	**24**	22	8	C	5	4				
	(Australia) Christian Pancione													5	13	12										
	(Australia) Aaron Love																						6	2	1	
	(Australia) Jake Santalucia																						9	12	14	
	(Australia) Tom Taplin																						19	16	15	
	(China) Li Xuanyu																						15	20	20	
	(Netherlands) Robert de Haan																						**Ret**	DNS	DNS	
Pos.	Driver	SYD (New South Wales)			MEL (Victoria (state))			DAR (Northern Territory)			QUE (Queensland)			BEN (South Australia)			BAT (New South Wales)			SUR (Queensland)			ADE (South Australia)			Points
Pos.	Driver	R1	R2	R3	R1	R2	R3	R1	R2	R3	R1	R2	R3	R1	R2	R3	R1	R2	R3	R1	R2	R3	R1	R2	R3	Points

Colour	Result
Gold	Winner
Silver	Second place
Bronze	Third place
Green	Points classification
Blue	Non-points classification
Blue	Non-classified finish (NC)
Purple	Retired, not classified (Ret)
Red	Did not qualify (DNQ)
Red	Did not pre-qualify (DNPQ)
Black	Disqualified (DSQ)
White	Did not start (DNS)
White	Withdrew (WD)
White	Race cancelled (C)
Blank	Did not practice (DNP)
Blank	Did not arrive (DNA)
Blank	Excluded (EX)

**Bold** – Pole
Italics – Fastest Lap

Notes

† – Driver did not finish the race, but were classified as they completed over 75% of the race distance.

=== Pro-Am ===
Pos.	Driver	SYD (New South Wales)			MEL (Victoria (state))			DAR (Northern Territory)			QUE (Queensland)			BEN (South Australia)			BAT (New South Wales)			SUR (Queensland)			ADE (South Australia)			Points
Pos.	Driver	R1	R2	R3	R1	R2	R3	R1	R2	R3	R1	R2	R3	R1	R2	R3	R1	R2	R3	R1	R2	R3	R1	R2	R3	Points
1	(Australia) Rodney Jane	2	3	4	2	1	4	2	2	2	2	6	3	4	2	3	4	4	4	C	3	4	4	1	2	1092
2	(Australia) Matthew Belford	5	7	5	5	4	3	3	1	1	Ret	2	4	1	4	1	1	1	2	C	1	1	1	4	1	1081
3	(Australia) Matt Slavin	4	5	1	Ret	Ret	DNS	1	3	3	3	4	5	5	3	4	3	3	1	C	DNS	DNS	2	Ret	DNS	731
4	(Australia) Brett Boulton	6	4	3	4	2	5				4	3	2	6	1	Ret	2	Ret	3	C	4	5				670
5	(Australia) Sam Shahin	Ret	2	6	1	Ret	2				1	1	1	3	5	2	6	Ret	DNS							552
6	(Australia) Marc Cini	7	9	9	7	5	7							8	7	6	7	5	6	C	6	6	5	5	4	513
7	(Australia) Stephen Grove													7	6	Ret	5	2	5	C	2	2	3	3	3	415
8	(Australia) Dean Cook				3	3	Ret							2	Ret	5				C	DNS	DNS	Ret	2	5	261
9	(Australia) Jacque Jarjo	1	6	7	6	Ret	6													C	Ret	3				233
10	(Australia) Adrian Flack	Ret	1	2	8	Ret	1																			201
11	(South Africa) Indiran Padayachee				9	6	8							9	Ret	DNS	Ret	6	7							165
12	(Australia) Daniel Stutterd	3	8	8																						100
13	(Australia) Scott Taylor										Ret	5	6				8	DNS	DNS							94
Pos.	Driver	SYD (New South Wales)			MEL (Victoria (state))			DAR (Northern Territory)			QUE (Queensland)			BEN (South Australia)			BAT (New South Wales)			SUR (Queensland)			ADE (South Australia)			Points
Pos.	Driver	R1	R2	R3	R1	R2	R3	R1	R2	R3	R1	R2	R3	R1	R2	R3	R1	R2	R3	R1	R2	R3	R1	R2	R3	Points

=== Junior ===
Pos.	Driver	SYD (New South Wales)			MEL (Victoria (state))			DAR (Northern Territory)			QUE (Queensland)			BEN (South Australia)			BAT (New South Wales)			SUR (Queensland)			ADE (South Australia)			Points
Pos.	Driver	R1	R2	R3	R1	R2	R3	R1	R2	R3	R1	R2	R3	R1	R2	R3	R1	R2	R3	R1	R2	R3	R1	R2	R3	Points
1	(Australia) Bayley Hall	2	4	2	10	2	12	5	2	3	4	9	22	9	3	5	8	6	15	C	1	1				778
2	(Australia) Marcos Flack	8	12	9	5	3	4	13	6	6	8	12	6	8	15	17	23	11	14	C	2	2				548
3	(New Zealand) Marco Giltrap	6	5	5	13	21	10	11	9	9	14	14	12	10	10	11	3	3	3	C	9	9				509
4	(New Zealand) Clay Osbourne	10	15	12	4	4	8	14	12	11	7	8	7	13	7	Ret	7	7	17	C	6	7				482
5	(Australia) Oscar Targett	4	2	4	25	16	14	12	7	8	16	22	13	12	6	8	26	9	10	C	DNS	DNS				414
6	(Australia) Lockie Bloxsom	21	13	15	16	11	11	9	13	12	9	13	8	4	14	7	9	15	11	C	10	12				407
7	(Australia) Hamish Fitzsimmons	12	25	14	11	10	9	10	15	16	12	6	10	11	16	13	5	4	4	C	DNS	DNS				392
8	(Australia) Caleb Sumich	11	9	7	6	Ret	16	15	14	14	11	10	11	15	18	Ret	12	Ret	12	C	DNS	DNS				271
9	(Australia) Tom McLennan	Ret	11	18	12	12	17	16	10	13	15	15	14	16	17	14	10	13	13	C	DNS	DNS				242
Pos.	Driver	SMP (New South Wales)			MEL (Victoria (state))			HID (Northern Territory)			QLD (Queensland)			BEN (South Australia)			BAT (New South Wales)			SUR (Queensland)			ADE (South Australia)			Points
Pos.	Driver	R1	R2	R3	R1	R2	R3	R1	R2	R3	R1	R2	R3	R1	R2	R3	R1	R2	R3	R1	R2	R3	R1	R2	R3	Points

=== Teams ===
Pos.	Team	Points
1	RAM Motorsport	2098
2	Sonic Motor Racing Services	1852
3	EMA Motorsport	1481
4	McElrea Racing	1247
5	Jones Motorsport	1074
6	TekworkX Motorsport	1059
7	Melbourne Performance Centre	1041
8	Earl Bamber Motorsport	855
9	RAM Motorsport 2	282
10	Melbourne Performance Centre 2	87

== See also ==
- 2025 Porsche Supercup
- 2025 Porsche Carrera Cup France
- 2025 Porsche Carrera Cup Germany
- 2025 Porsche Carrera Cup North America
- 2025 Porsche Carrera Cup Asia
- 2025 Porsche Carrera Cup Japan
