= 2026 Bathurst 1000 =

Motor racing event

(New South Wales) 2026 Bathurst 1000
Event Information
- Round 11 of 14 in the 2026 Supercars Championship
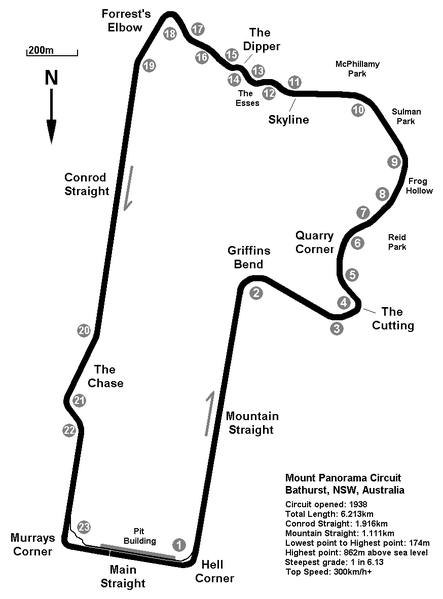
- Layout of the Mount Panorama Circuit
- Date: 8-11 October 2026
- Location: Bathurst, New South Wales
- Venue: Mount Panorama Circuit
- Weather: Fine

Results
Race 1
Distance	161 laps	1000 km
Pole position	(Australia) Zach Bates; Matt Stone Racing	2:04.2062
Winner	(Australia) Brodie Kostecki (Australia) Todd Hazelwood; Dick Johnson Racing	5:54:04.7490

The 2026 Bathurst 1000, known for naming rights reasons as the 2026 Repco Bathurst 1000, was a motor racing event for Supercars held from 8 to 11 October 2026. It was race 30 of the 2026 Supercars Championship and took place at the Mount Panorama Circuit in Bathurst, New South Wales, Australia, featuring a single race of 1000 kilometres.

Brodie Kostecki and Todd Hazelwood claimed victory for Dick Johnson Racing after Anton de Pasquale ran out of fuel from the race lead on the final lap. The winning time of five hours and 54 minutes made it the fastest Bathurst 1000 in history, aided by just one safety car period, eclipsing the fastest time set in 2024 by four minutes. It was the second Bathurst 1000 win for Kostecki and Hazelwood, whilst Dick Johnson Racing won their first Great Race since 2019 and their fifth overall.

== Background ==
The event was the 69th running of the Bathurst 1000, which was first held at the Phillip Island Grand Prix Circuit in 1960 as a 500-mile race for Australian-made standard production sedans, and marked the 66th time that the race was held at Mount Panorama. It was the 30th running of the "Australia 1000" race, which was first held after the organisational split between the Australian Racing Drivers Club and V8 Supercars Australia that saw two "Bathurst 1000" races contested in both 1997 and 1998.

Toyota made its first appearance at the Bathurst 1000 in the Supercars era, and its first at the event since the 1998 AMP Bathurst 1000.

Matt Payne was the defending race winner. Co-driver Garth Tander did not defend his title, having retired from driving and moved into full time commentary.

=== Entry list ===
Twenty-six cars contested the event; ten Chevrolet Camaros, eleven Ford Mustangs and five Toyota Supras. In addition to the 24 regular-season entries, two wildcard entrants joined the field from Team 18 and Garry Rogers Motorsport.

Four drivers made their Bathurst 1000 debut; regular season driver Jackson Walls, Super2 Series drivers Reuben Goodall and Bayley Hall, and two-time Australian National Trans-Am Series champion Nathan Herne.

No.	Drivers	Team (Sponsors)	Car	No.	Drivers	Team (Sponsors)	Car
1	(Australia) Chaz Mostert (New Zealand) Fabian Coulthard	Walkinshaw TWG Racing (Mobil 1, Optus)	Toyota GR Supra	18	(Australia) Anton de Pasquale (Australia) Lee Holdsworth	Team 18 (DeWalt)	Chevrolet Camaro ZL1
2	(New Zealand) Ryan Wood (New Zealand) Jaxon Evans	Walkinshaw TWG Racing (Mobil 1, Truck Assist)	Toyota GR Supra	19	(New Zealand) Matthew Payne (Australia) Will Davison	Grove Racing (Penrite)	Ford Mustang S650
3	(Australia) Aaron Cameron (Australia) Zak Best	Blanchard Racing Team (Liqui Moly, Blahst)	Ford Mustang S650	26	(Australia) Kai Allen (Australia) Tim Slade	Grove Racing (Penrite)	Ford Mustang S650
4	(Australia) Jack Le Brocq (Australia) Harri Jones	Matt Stone Racing (Sherrin Rentals)	Chevrolet Camaro ZL1	31	(Australia) Jayden Ojeda (Australia) David Russell	PremiAir Racing (PremiAir Hire)	Chevrolet Camaro ZL1
6	(Australia) Cameron Waters (Australia) Mark Winterbottom	Tickford Racing (Monster Energy)	Ford Mustang S650	34	(Australia) James Moffat (Australia) Nathan Herne	Garry Rogers Motorsport (Valvoline)	Chevrolet Camaro ZL1
7	(Australia) James Golding (New Zealand) Richie Stanaway	Blanchard Racing Team (Cooldrive, Redarc)	Ford Mustang S650	38	(Australia) Rylan Gray (Australia) Tony D'Alberto	Dick Johnson Racing (Shell V-Power)	Ford Mustang S650
8	(New Zealand) Andre Heimgartner (Australia) Bryce Fullwood	Brad Jones Racing (R&J Batteries)	Toyota GR Supra	48	(Australia) David Reynolds (Australia) James Courtney	Team 18 (Snowy River Caravans)	Chevrolet Camaro ZL1
9	(Australia) Jobe Stewart (Australia) Jarrod Hughes	Erebus Motorsport (Chiko)	Chevrolet Camaro ZL1	55	(Australia) Thomas Randle (Australia) Reuben Goodall	Tickford Racing (Castrol)	Ford Mustang S650
10	(Australia) Zach Bates (Australia) Aaron Seton	Matt Stone Racing (Bendix)	Chevrolet Camaro ZL1	88	(Australia) Broc Feeney (Australia) Nick Percat	Triple Eight Race Engineering (Red Bull, Ampol)	Ford Mustang S650
11	(Australia) Jackson Walls (Australia) Jack Perkins	Triple Eight Race Engineering (Objective Software)	Ford Mustang S650	96	(Australia) Macauley Jones (Australia) Jordan Boys	Brad Jones Racing (Automotive Superstore)	Toyota GR Supra
14	(Australia) Cameron Hill (Australia) Brad Vaughan	Brad Jones Racing (Dare Iced Coffee)	Toyota GR Supra	99	(Australia) Cooper Murray (Australia) Lochie Dalton	Erebus Motorsport (TotalEnergies)	Chevrolet Camaro ZL1
15	(Australia) Bayley Hall (Australia) Craig Lowndes	Team 18 (Supercheap Auto)	Chevrolet Camaro ZL1	777	(Australia) Declan Fraser (Australia) Nash Morris	PremiAir Racing (PremiAir Hire)	Chevrolet Camaro ZL1
17	(Australia) Brodie Kostecki (Australia) Todd Hazelwood	Dick Johnson Racing (Shell V-Power)	Ford Mustang S650	888	(Australia) Will Brown (Australia) Scott Pye	Triple Eight Race Engineering (Red Bull, Ampol)	Ford Mustang S650

Entered the race as a wildcard.

== Results ==
=== Practice ===
Session	Day	Fastest Lap						
Session	Day	No.	Driver	Team	Car	Time	Cond	Ref
Practice 1	Thursday	26	(Australia) Kai Allen	Grove Racing	Ford Mustang S650	2:05.546	Fine	
Practice 2 (Co-Driver)	Thursday	99	(Australia) Lochie Dalton	Erebus Motorsport	Chevrolet Camaro ZL1	2:05.874	Fine	
Practice 3	Friday	99	(Australia) Cooper Murray	Erebus Motorsport	Chevrolet Camaro ZL1	2:04.712	Fine	
Practice 4	Friday	7	(Australia) James Golding	Blanchard Racing Team	Ford Mustang S650	2:04.649	Fine	
Practice 5 (Co-Driver)	Saturday	9	(Australia) Jarrod Hughes	Erebus Motorsport	Chevrolet Camaro ZL1	2:05.586	Fine	
Practice 6	Saturday	7	(Australia) James Golding	Blanchard Racing Team	Ford Mustang S650	2:05.209	Fine	
Warm Up	Sunday	1	(Australia) Chaz Mostert	Walkinshaw TWG Racing	Toyota GR Supra	2:05.321	Fine	

=== Qualifying ===
==== Provisional ====
Pos.	No.	Driver	Team	Car	Time	Gap	Grid
1	10	(Australia) Zach Bates	Matt Stone Racing	Chevrolet Camaro ZL1	2:03.9376		Top 10
2	18	(Australia) Anton De Pasquale	Team 18	Chevrolet Camaro ZL1	2:04.0538	+0.1162	Top 10
3	99	(Australia) Cooper Murray	Erebus Motorsport	Chevrolet Camaro ZL1	2:04.1720	+0.2344	Top 10
4	888	(Australia) Will Brown	Triple Eight Race Engineering	Ford Mustang S650	2:04.2799	+0.3423	Top 10
5	17	(Australia) Brodie Kostecki	Dick Johnson Racing	Ford Mustang S650	2:04.3381	+0.4005	Top 10
6	48	(Australia) David Reynolds	Team 18	Chevrolet Camaro ZL1	2:04.3386	+0.4010	Top 10
7	4	(Australia) Jack Le Brocq	Matt Stone Racing	Chevrolet Camaro ZL1	2:04.3443	+00.4067	Top 10
8	31	(Australia) Jayden Ojeda	PremiAir Racing	Chevrolet Camaro ZL1	2:04.3564	+0.4188	Top 10
9	19	(New Zealand) Matthew Payne	Grove Racing	Ford Mustang S650	2:04.3825	+0.4449	Top 10
10	7	(Australia) James Golding	Blanchard Racing Team	Ford Mustang S650	2:04.4991	+0.5615	Top 10
11	26	(Australia) Kai Allen	Grove Racing	Ford Mustang S650	2:04.5180	+0.5804	11
12	88	(Australia) Broc Feeney	Triple Eight Race Engineering	Ford Mustang S650	2:04.5241	+0.5865	12
13	55	(Australia) Thomas Randle	Tickford Racing	Ford Mustang S650	2:04.5363	+0.5987	13
14	6	(Australia) Cameron Waters	Tickford Racing	Ford Mustang S650	2:04.5443	+0.6067	14
15	8	(New Zealand) Andre Heimgartner	Brad Jones Racing	Toyota GR Supra	2:04.5566	+0.6190	15
16	1	(Australia) Chaz Mostert	Walkinshaw TWG Racing	Toyota GR Supra	2:04.6817	+0.7441	16
17	9	(Australia) Jobe Stewart	Erebus Motorsport	Chevrolet Camaro ZL1	2:04.6923	+0.7547	17
18	3	(Australia) Aaron Cameron	Blanchard Racing Team	Ford Mustang S650	2:04.9557	+1.0181	18
19	14	(Australia) Cameron Hill	Brad Jones Racing	Toyota GR Supra	2:05.0040	+1.0664	19
20	96	(Australia) Macauley Jones	Brad Jones Racing	Toyota GR Supra	2:05.0380	+1.1004	20
21	34	(Australia) Nathan Herne	Garry Rogers Motorsport	Chevrolet Camaro ZL1	2:05.0675	+1.1299	21
22	15	(Australia) Bayley Hall	Team 18	Chevrolet Camaro ZL1	2:05.1155	+1.1779	22
23	777	(Australia) Declan Fraser	PremiAir Racing	Chevrolet Camaro ZL1	2:05.1897	+1.2521	23
24	11	(Australia) Jackson Walls	Triple Eight Race Engineering	Ford Mustang S650	2:05.6261	+1.6885	24

Cars 2 and 38 were ruled out of qualifying due to heavy crashes sustained in Free Practice 3

==== Top 10 Shootout ====
Pos.	No.	Driver	Team	Car	Time	Gap	Grid
1	10	(Australia) Zach Bates	Matt Stone Racing	Chevrolet Camaro ZL1	2:04.2062		1
2	17	(Australia) Brodie Kostecki	Dick Johnson Racing	Ford Mustang S650	2:04.4912	+0.2850	2
3	18	(Australia) Anton de Pasquale	Team 18	Chevrolet Camaro ZL1	2:04.5296	+0.3234	3
4	99	(Australia) Cooper Murray	Erebus Motorsport	Chevrolet Camaro ZL1	2:04.6970	+0.4908	4
5	4	(Australia) Jack Le Brocq	Matt Stone Racing	Chevrolet Camaro ZL1	2:04.9854	+0.7792	5
6	888	(Australia) Will Brown	Triple Eight Race Engineering	Ford Mustang S650	2:05.1198	+0.9136	6
7	31	(Australia) Jayden Ojeda	PremiAir Racing	Chevrolet Camaro ZL1	2:05.1558	+0.9496	7
8	48	(Australia) David Reynolds	Team 18	Chevrolet Camaro ZL1	2:05.1732	+0.9670	8
9	7	(Australia) James Golding	Blanchard Racing Team	Ford Mustang S650	2:05.3028	+1.0966	9
10	19	(New Zealand) Matthew Payne	Grove Racing	Ford Mustang S650	2:05.3517	+1.1455	10

=== Grid ===
Inside row			Outside row		
1	(Australia) Zach Bates (Australia) Aaron Seton	10	17	(Australia) Brodie Kostecki (Australia) Todd Hazelwood	2
1	Matt Stone Racing (Chevrolet Camaro ZL1)		Dick Johnson Racing (Ford Mustang S650)		2
3	(Australia) Anton de Pasquale (Australia) Lee Holdsworth	18	99	(Australia) Cooper Murray (Australia) Lochie Dalton	4
3	Team 18 (Chevrolet Camaro ZL1)		Erebus Motorsport (Chevrolet Camaro ZL1)		4
5	(Australia) Jack Le Brocq (Australia) Harri Jones	4	888	(Australia) Will Brown (Australia) Scott Pye	6
5	Matt Stone Racing (Chevrolet Camaro ZL1)		Triple Eight Race Engineering (Ford Mustang S650)		6
7	(Australia) Jayden Ojeda (Australia) David Russell	31	48	(Australia) David Reynolds (Australia) James Courtney	8
7	PremiAir Racing (Chevrolet Camaro ZL1)		Team 18 (Chevrolet Camaro ZL1)		8
9	(Australia) James Golding (New Zealand) Richie Stanaway	7	19	(New Zealand) Matthew Payne (Australia) Will Davison	10
9	Blanchard Racing Team (Ford Mustang S650)		Grove Racing (Ford Mustang S650)		10
11	(Australia) Kai Allen (Australia) Tim Slade	26	88	(Australia) Broc Feeney (Australia) Nick Percat	12
11	Grove Racing (Ford Mustang S650)		Triple Eight Race Engineering (Ford Mustang S650)		12
13	(Australia) Thomas Randle (Australia) Reuben Goodall	55	6	(Australia) Cameron Waters (Australia) Mark Winterbottom	14
13	Tickford Racing (Ford Mustang S650)		Tickford Racing (Ford Mustang S650)		14
15	(New Zealand) Andre Heimgartner (Australia) Bryce Fullwood	8	1	(Australia) Chaz Mostert (New Zealand) Fabian Coulthard	16
15	Brad Jones Racing (Toyota GR Supra)		Walkinshaw TWG Racing (Toyota GR Supra)		16
17	(Australia) Jobe Stewart (Australia) Jarrod Hughes	9	3	(Australia) Aaron Cameron (Australia) Zak Best	18
17	Erebus Motorsport (Chevrolet Camaro ZL1)		Blanchard Racing Team (Ford Mustang S650)		18
19	(Australia) Cameron Hill (Australia) Brad Vaughan	14	96	(Australia) Macauley Jones (Australia) Jordan Boys	20
19	Brad Jones Racing (Toyota GR Supra)		Brad Jones Racing (Toyota GR Supra)		20
21	(Australia) James Moffat (Australia) Nathan Herne	34	15	(Australia) Bayley Hall (Australia) Craig Lowndes	22
21	Garry Rogers Motorsport (Chevrolet Camaro ZL1)		Team 18 (Chevrolet Camaro ZL1)		22
23	(Australia) Declan Fraser (Australia) Nash Morris	777	11	(Australia) Jackson Walls (Australia) Jack Perkins	24
23	PremiAir Racing (Chevrolet Camaro ZL1)		Triple Eight Race Engineering (Ford Mustang S650)		24
25	(Australia) Rylan Gray (Australia) Tony D'Alberto	38	2	(New Zealand) Ryan Wood (New Zealand) Jaxon Evans	26
25	Dick Johnson Racing (Ford Mustang S650)		Walkinshaw TWG Racing (Toyota GR Supra)		26

Car 11 started from the pitlane with power steering problems. Position 24 was left empty.

=== Race ===
Pos.	No.	Drivers	Team	Car	Laps	Time/Retired	Grid	Points
1	17	(Australia) Brodie Kostecki (Australia) Todd Hazelwood	Dick Johnson Racing	Ford Mustang S650	161	5:54:04.7490	2	300
2	888	(Australia) Will Brown (Australia) Scott Pye	Triple Eight Race Engineering	Ford Mustang S650	161	+1.1844	6	276
3	10	(Australia) Zach Bates (Australia) Aaron Seton	Matt Stone Racing	Chevrolet Camaro ZL1	161	+1.9265	1	254
4	4	(Australia) Jack Le Brocq (Australia) Harri Jones	Matt Stone Racing	Chevrolet Camaro ZL1	161	+3.0218	5	234
5	19	(New Zealand) Matthew Payne (Australia) Will Davison	Grove Racing	Ford Mustang S650	161	+3.5276	10	215
6	99	(Australia) Cooper Murray (Australia) Lochie Dalton	Erebus Motorsport	Chevrolet Camaro ZL1	161	+3.9568	4	198
7	8	(New Zealand) Andre Heimgartner (Australia) Bryce Fullwood	Brad Jones Racing	Toyota GR Supra	161	+4.2623	15	172
8	7	(Australia) James Golding (New Zealand) Richie Stanaway	Blanchard Racing Team	Ford Mustang S650	161	+4.7341	9	167
9	55	(Australia) Thomas Randle (Australia) Reuben Goodall	Tickford Racing	Ford Mustang S650	161	+6.9564	13	154
10	15	(Australia) Bayley Hall (Australia) Craig Lowndes	Team 18	Chevrolet Camaro ZL1	161	+7.3646	22	142
11	88	(Australia) Broc Feeney (Australia) Nick Percat	Triple Eight Race Engineering	Ford Mustang S650	161	+7.4962	12	130
12	31	(Australia) Jayden Ojeda (Australia) David Russell	PremiAir Racing	Chevrolet Camaro ZL1	161	+7.7502	7	120
13	3	(Australia) Aaron Cameron (Australia) Zak Best	Blanchard Racing Team	Ford Mustang S650	161	+7.8944	18	110
14	14	(Australia) Cameron Hill (Australia) Brad Vaughan	Brad Jones Racing	Toyota GR Supra	161	+10.3056	19	101
15	6	(Australia) Cameron Waters (Australia) Mark Winterbottom	Tickford Racing	Ford Mustang S650	161	+13.7625	14	93
16	9	(Australia) Jobe Stewart (Australia) Jarrod Hughes	Erebus Motorsport	Chevrolet Camaro ZL1	161	+18.5334	17	86
17	48	(Australia) David Reynolds (Australia) James Courtney	Team 18	Chevrolet Camaro ZL1	160	+1 Lap	8	79
18	777	(Australia) Declan Fraser (Australia) Nash Morris	PremiAir Racing	Chevrolet Camaro ZL1	160	+1 Lap	23	73
19	34	(Australia) James Moffat (Australia) Nathan Herne	Garry Rogers Motorsport	Chevrolet Camaro ZL1	159	+2 Laps	21	67
20	26	(Australia) Kai Allen (Australia) Tim Slade	Grove Racing	Ford Mustang S650	159	+2 Laps	11	62
21	96	(Australia) Macauley Jones (Australia) Jordan Boys	Brad Jones Racing	Toyota GR Supra	159	+2 Laps	20	57
22	38	(Australia) Rylan Gray (Australia) Tony D'Alberto	Dick Johnson Racing	Ford Mustang S650	157	+4 Laps	25	52
23	11	(Australia) Jackson Walls (Australia) Jack Perkins	Triple Eight Race Engineering	Ford Mustang S650	146	+15 Laps	PL	48
24	2	(New Zealand) Ryan Wood (New Zealand) Jaxon Evans	Walkinshaw TWG Racing	Toyota GR Supra	145	+16 Laps	26	44
Ret	18	(Australia) Anton de Pasquale (Australia) Lee Holdsworth	Team 18	Chevrolet Camaro ZL1	160	Out of fuel	3	0
Ret	1	(Australia) Chaz Mostert (New Zealand) Fabian Coulthard	Walkinshaw TWG Racing	Toyota GR Supra	155	Crash	16	0
Fastest lap set by Brodie Kostecki - 2:06.4952 on lap 153

== Broadcast ==
The event telecast was produced by Supercars Media and carried domestically by Kayo Sports, a paid service which covered all sessions including support categories, and the Seven Network (via free-to-air channels 7HD and 7mate, as well as streaming on 7plus), which covered select sessions from midday Friday onwards. The race was also carried on radio by Sports Entertainment Network. It was the first Bathurst 1000 to feature Richard Craill as the lead caller; the South Australian was installed as Supercars' permanent lead caller at the Townsville 500 earlier in the season having previously covered the Bathurst 12 Hour broadcast since 2013.

Kayo Sports	Seven Network	SEN Radio
Host: Jessica Yates; Booth: Richard Craill, Garth Tander, Greg Murphy; Pit-lane: Chad Neylon, Mark Larkham, Riana Crehan	Presenters: Mel McLaughlin, Mark Beretta, Matthew White; Pundits: Molly Taylor, Aaron Noonan; Roving: Emma Freedman	Broadcasters: Mark Skaife, Matthew Cocks, Amin Azoor
