= Harri Jones =

Australian racing driver

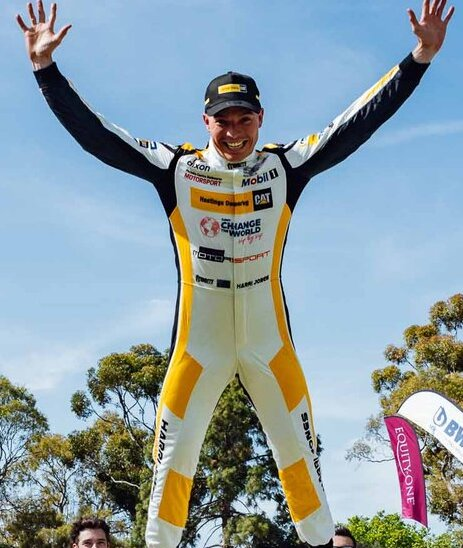
- Jones in 2024
- Nationality: (Australia) Australian
- Born: Harrison Edward Jones; 2 June 1999 (age 27) Buderim, Queensland, Australia

Australian Carrera Cup career
- Current team: McElrea Racing
- Starts: 113
- Wins: 35
- Podiums: 64
- Poles: 18
- Fastest laps: 27
- Best finish: 1st in 2022, 2024 and 2026

Previous series
- 2023: Porsche Supercup

Championship titles
- 2022, 2024, 2026: Porsche Carrera Cup Australia

Harrison Edward Jones (born 2 June 1999) is an Australian racing driver. He is the 2022, 2024 and 2026 Porsche Carrera Cup Australia Champion, a co-driver for Matt Stone Racing in the 2026 Supercars Championship, and previous driver for BWT Lechner Racing in the Porsche Mobil 1 Supercup. He is the Team Principal of Jones Motorsport, in which he competed in Porsche Carrera Cup Australia in 2025 as a privateer, and runs multiple cars in the Porsche Sprint Challenge Australia, and other categories.

== Personal life ==
Harrison Edward Jones was born and grew up on the Sunshine Coast, Queensland, Australia. He attended school at Immanuel Lutheran College, where he met his wife Emily. He graduated from University of Queensland in March 2024 with Bachelor of Engineering. He is the first motorsport athlete at the university to be awarded a UQ Blue award, for outstanding sporting achievements. Jones is also a driver development coach in Australian Motorsport.

Prior to race car driving, Jones grew up racing downhill mountain bikes. He considers his best result to be third place in the Oceania Downhill Mountain Bike Championship.

Jones is the nephew of Australian Infectious Disease Paediatrician Cheryl Jones. He is not related to 1980 Formula One World Champion Alan Jones.

== Career ==
=== Formula racing ===
Jones' car racing career began in 2015 with the Queensland Formula Ford Championship. From 2016 to 2018 he also competed in the Australian Formula Ford Championship.

In late 2017, Jones joined the final round of the Australian Formula 3 Premier Series and took his first race win in the final race of the season. The following year he joined the series full-time and crowned himself the 2018 Australian Formula 3 Premier Series champion. The car was run as a family team under Jones Motorsport.

Jones competed in the 2017–18 MRF Challenge Formula 2000 Championship, taking place in India and Middle-East. He finished the season in seventh overall.

=== Sports car racing ===
==== Bathurst 12 hour ====
At the start of 2017 Jones made his sports car racing debut in the 2017 Bathurst 12 Hour. It was also his first time racing at the Mount Panorama Circuit. Together with his teammates Max Braams, Nicolaj Møller Madsen and Jörg Viebahn he won in the GT4 Category for PROsport Performance.

==== Australian Porsche Sprint Challenge ====
In 2019, Jones joined forces with McElrea Racing to campaign in the Porsche GT3 Cup Challenge Australia. It was his first full season of 'tin top' racing. He took the lead of the championship after a win in the second round at Sydney Motorsport Park. At the end of the year, he won the championship with a gap of 38 points.

==== Australian Porsche Carrera Cup ====
In preparation for a full-time drive in 2020, Jones raced on the streets of Surfers Paradise for the last round of the 2019 Porsche Carrera Cup Australia. It was his first race on a street circuit. After a DNF in race 1, he managed to finish the final race in eighth position.

COVID-19 put a pause on racing for the majority of 2020. Once racing recommenced in December 2020, Jones took pole and won the race at Sandown.

Jones competed in the championship again in 2021. It was his third year racing under the McElrea Racing banner. He finished the season in third. Jones had his first win of the season at Bathurst in the final round of the season, seeing him come away with five podiums, one race win and two pole positions for the year.

In the 2022 Porsche Carrera Cup Australia, the new Porsche 911 (992) GT3 Cup was introduced. After the eighth and final round of the Championship, Jones claimed the 2022 title.

==== Porsche Supercup and German Carrera Cup ====
Jones competed with BWT Lechner Racing in the 2023 Porsche Supercup, finishing as the rookie vice-champion and ninth overall with a best result of fourth at Monza.

Jones also raced for Scherer Sport PHX in the 2023 Porsche Carrera Cup Germany, finishing 12th overall and rookie vice-champion.

==== Return to Australian Porsche Carrera Cup ====
In 2024, Jones returned to Australia and secured his second Porsche Carrera Cup Australia Championship title, driving for Porsche Centre Melbourne Motorsport. He dominated the season with six round wins, twelve race victories, eighteen podium finishes, and five pole positions.

For 2025, Jones transitioned from being a factory-backed driver to running his own team, Jones Motorsport. This move came after the closure of Porsche Centre Melbourne's motorsport division following Penske's takeover. He finished the 2025 season second in the championship behind Dylan O'Keeffe, with ten race wins. In 2026 he returned to the McElrea Racing banner, leading the championship from the first round at Albert Park. During the season he passed Jim Richards' tally of Carrera Cup race wins, and he clinched his third Carrera Cup Australia title with a round to spare at the Gold Coast 500 in October 2026.

==== Supercars Championship ====
In 2025, Jones competed as a co-driver for Team 18 in the Supercars Championship endurance races, where he paired with Anton De Pasquale in the No. 18 DEWALT Racing Chevrolet Camaro, competing at The Bend 500 and the Bathurst 1000. In August 2026, Jones was called up by Matt Stone Racing as a late replacement for the unwell Cameron Crick, partnering Jack Le Brocq in the No. 4 Chevrolet Camaro at The Bend 500 and the Bathurst 1000. The pair finished 11th at The Bend and fourth at Bathurst, a result that secured Le Brocq the tenth and final place in the Supercars Finals series. Le Brocq and Jones finished fourth in the Enduro Cup standings.

=== Jones Motorsport ===
Jones is the team principal of Jones Motorsport, a family-owned racing team based on the Sunshine Coast, founded in 2016. The family team ran Jones' car to the 2018 Australian Formula 3 Premier Series title and later began fielding cars in the Porsche Sprint Challenge. In 2025 Jones took over running the team, which entered cars in the Sprint Challenge alongside his own Carrera Cup campaign. That year the team won the Sprint Challenge Pro-Am class with Ramu Farrell, who also became the first Pro-Am driver under the current class structure to win a Sprint Challenge race outright. The team continued in the Sprint Challenge in 2026 after Jones returned to McElrea Racing as a driver, running Hunter Robb and Ben Taylor, with James Lodge and Mark Darling joining for selected rounds. It operates from the family's Jones Motor Culture facility at Kunda Park, which also provides prestige vehicle servicing, classic car restoration and vehicle storage.

In November 2026, Jones launched Rovantra, a motorsport software business whose first product is a timing and data platform used by Jones Motorsport and McElrea Racing.

== Racing record ==
=== Career summary ===
| Season | Series | Team | Races | Wins | Poles | FLaps | Podiums | Points | Position |
|---|---|---|---|---|---|---|---|---|---|
| 2015 | Queensland Formula Ford Championship | Jones Motorsport | 6 | 0 | 0 | 0 | 1 | 119 | 6th |
| 2016 | Queensland Formula Ford 1600 Series | Greg Fahey Motorsport | 11 | 0 | 0 | 1 | 7 | 97 | 8th |
| 2016 | Queensland Formula Ford Championship | Greg Fahey Motorsport | 6 | 0 | 0 | 1 | 3 | 110 | 9th |
| 2016 | Australian Formula Ford Championship | Jones Motorsport | 9 | 0 | 0 | 0 | 0 | 70 | 11th |
| 2017 | Liqui Moly Bathurst 12 Hour - Class C | PROsport Performance | 1 | 1 | 0 | 0 | 1 | N/A | **1st** |
| 2017 | Intercontinental GT Challenge | PROsport Performance | 1 | 0 | 0 | 0 | 0 | 0 | NC |
| 2017 | Australian Formula Ford Championship | Jones Motorsport | 17 | 0 | 0 | 0 | 0 | 128 | 8th |
| 2017 | Victorian Formula Ford Fiesta Championship | Jones Motorsport | 6 | 0 | 0 | 0 | 0 | 100 | 15th |
| 2017 | Australian Formula 3 Premier Series | Jones Motorsport | 3 | 1 | 0 | 0 | 2 | 35 | 5th |
| 2017–18 | MRF Challenge Formula 2000 Championship | MRF Racing | 16 | 0 | 0 | 0 | 0 | 66 | 7th |
| 2018 | Australian Formula 3 Premier Series | Jones Motorsport | 18 | 11 | 3 | 6 | 18 | 243 | **1st** |
| 2018 | Australian Formula Ford Series | Jones Motorsport | 3 | 0 | 0 | 0 | 0 | 1 | 28th |
| 2018 | Australian GT Trophy Series - GT4 | Ginetta Australia | 1 | 0 | 0 | 0 | 0 | 14 | 12th |
| 2018 | T124 Italian Challenge | | 4 | 4 | 1 | 4 | 4 | 80 | 7th |
| 2018 | V de V Endurance Series - LMP3 | Monza Garage | 1 | 0 | 0 | 0 | 0 | 0 | NC |
| 2019 | Porsche GT3 Cup Challenge Australia | McElrea Racing | 18 | 3 | 2 | 1 | 15 | 924 | **1st** |
| 2019 | Porsche Carrera Cup Australia | McElrea Racing | 3 | 0 | 0 | 0 | 0 | 38 | 29th |
| 2020 | The Bend Super Tin Tops – Super Cup | McElrea Racing | 3 | 3 | 1 | 3 | 3 | 150 | **1st** |
| 2020 | Townsville Tin Tops – Super Stuttgart | McElrea Racing | 3 | 3 | 1 | 3 | 3 | 150 | **1st** |
| 2020 | Porsche Carrera Cup Australia | McElrea Racing | 7 | 1 | 1 | 0 | 3 | 61 | 10th |
| 2020 | Phillip Island Classic Groups Q & R Sports & Invited | Jones Motorsport | 5 | 5 | 1 | 5 | 5 | N/A | **1st** |
| 2021 | Porsche Carrera Cup Australia | McElrea Racing | 13 | 1 | 2 | 0 | 5 | 534 | **3rd** |
| 2022 | Porsche Carrera Cup Australia | McElrea Racing | 24 | 4 | 0 | 0 | 10 | 764 | **1st** |
| 2022–23 | Porsche Sprint Challenge Middle East | BWT Junior Racing | 6 | 2 | 2 | 2 | 5 | 179 | 10th |
| 2023 | Porsche Supercup | BWT Lechner Racing | 8 | 0 | 0 | 0 | 0 | 63 | 9th |
| 2023 | Porsche Carrera Cup Germany | Scherer Sport PHX | 16 | 0 | 0 | 0 | 0 | 75 | 12th |
| 2023 | Porsche Carrera Cup Australia | Jones Motorsport | 5 | 0 | 1 | 3 | 3 | 205 | 19th |
| 2023–24 | Porsche Carrera Cup Middle East | Jones Motorsport | 2 | 0 | 0 | 0 | 0 | 22 | 15th |
| 2024 | Porsche Carrera Cup Australia | Porsche Centre Melbourne | 24 | 12 | 5 | 7 | 18 | 1150 | **1st** |
| 2025 | Porsche Carrera Cup Australia | Jones Motorsport | 23 | 10 | 4 | 13 | 13 | 981 | **2nd** |
| 2025 | Supercars Championship | Team 18 | 2 | 0 | 0 | 0 | 0 | 204 | 35th |
| 2026 | Porsche Carrera Cup Australia | McElrea Racing | 14 | 9 | 4 | 7 | 14 | 869* | **1st*** |
| 2026 | Supercars Championship | Matt Stone Racing | 2 | 0 | 0 | 0 | 0 | 376* | 29th* |

=== Complete Porsche Carrera Cup Australia results ===
| Year | Team | Car | 1 | 2 | 3 | 4 | 5 | 6 | 7 | 8 | 9 | 10 | 11 | 12 | 13 | 14 | 15 | 16 | 17 | 18 | 19 | 20 | 21 | 22 | 23 | 24 | 25 | 26 | Position | Points |
|---|---|---|---|---|---|---|---|---|---|---|---|---|---|---|---|---|---|---|---|---|---|---|---|---|---|---|---|---|---|---|
| 2019 | McElrea Racing | Porsche 911 GT3 Cup | ADE; R1 | ADE; R2 | ADE; R3 | MEL; R4 | MEL; R5 | MEL; R6 | MEL; R7 | PHI; R8 | PHI; R9 | PHI; R10 | HID; R10 | HID; R11 | HID; R12 | TOW; R13 | TOW; R13 | TOW; R13 | BEN; R15 | BEN; R16 | BEN; R17 | BAT; R18 | BAT; R19 | BAT; R20 | SUR; R21; Ret | SUR; R22; 14 | SUR; R23; 8 | | 29th | 38 |
| 2020 | McElrea Racing | Porsche 911 GT3 Cup | ADE; R1; 11 | ADE; R2; 10 | ADE; R3; 9 | MEL; R4; 7 | MEL; R5; C | MEL; R6; C | MEL; R7; C | | | | | | | | | | | | | | | | | | | | 10th | 83 |
| 2021 | McElrea Racing | Porsche 911 GT3 Cup | **SAN**; **R1**; **11** | SAN; R2; 11 | SAN; R3; 8 | BEN; R4; 2 | BEN; R5; 2 | BEN; R6; 2 | TOW; R7; 7 | TOW; R8; 5 | TOW; R9; 5 | BAT; R10; 5 | BAT; R11; 5 | BAT; R12; 1 | BAT; R13; 3 | | | | | | | | | | | | | | **3rd** | **534** |
| 2022 | McElrea Racing | Porsche 992 GT3 Cup | ALB; R1; 7 | ALB; R2; 4 | ALB; R3; 3 | ALB; R4; 1 | WIN; R5; 1 | **WIN**; **R6**; **2** | WIN; R7; 1 | **HID**; **R8**; **1** | **HID**; **R9**; **2** | HID; R10; 2 | TOW; R11; 13 | TOW; R12; 10 | TOW; R13; 7 | BEN; R14; 7 | BEN; R15; 9 | BEN; R16; 16 | SAN; R17; 5 | SAN; R18; 3 | SAN; R19; Ret | BAT; R20; 4 | BAT; R21; C | BAT; R22; C | SUR; R23; 6 | SUR; R24; 5 | SUR; R25; 6 | | **1st** | **831** |
| 2023 | Jones Motorsport | Porsche 992 GT3 Cup | ALB; R1 | ALB; R2 | ALB; R3 | HID; R4 | HID; R5 | HID; R6 | TOW; R7 | TOW; R8 | TOW; R9 | BEN; R10 | BEN; R11 | BEN; R12 | SAN; R13 | SAN; R14 | SAN; R15 | **BAT**; **R16**; **2** | BAT; R17; 2 | BAT; R18; 2 | SUR; R19; Ret | SUR; R20; 4 | SUR; R21; DNS | ADE; R22 | ADE; R23 | ADE; R24 | | | 19th | 205 |
| 2024 | Porsche Centre Melbourne | Porsche 992 GT3 Cup | **ALB**; **R1**; **1** | **ALB**; **R2**; **1** | **ALB**; **R3**; **3** | TAU; R4; 3 | TAU; R5; 13 | TAU; R6; 11 | **HID**; **R7**; **1** | **HID**; **R8**; **1** | **HID**; **R9**; **1** | **SMP**; **R10**; **1** | SMP; R11; 1 | **SMP**; **R12**; **1** | **SAN**; **R13**; **1** | **SAN**; **R14**; **2** | SAN; R15; 1 | **BAT**; **R16**; **1** | **BAT**; **R17**; **1** | **BAT**; **R18**; **3** | SUR; R19; 7 | SUR; R20; 3 | SUR; R21; 3 | ADE; R22; 14 | ADE; R23; 4 | ADE; R24; 7 | | | **1st** | **1150** |
| 2025 | Jones Motorsport | Porsche 992 GT3 Cup | **SMP**; **R1**; **1** | **SMP**; **R2**; **1** | **SMP**; **R3**; **1** | **ALB**; **R4**; **1** | **ALB**; **R5**; **7** | ALB; R6; 6 | HID; R7; 2 | HID; R8; 3 | HID; R9; 2 | **QLD**; **R10**; **1** | **QLD**; **R11**; **1** | **QLD**; **R12**; **1** | **BEN**; **R13**; **1** | BEN; R14; 1 | **BEN**; **R15**; **1** | BAT; R16; 11 | BAT; R17; 10 | BAT; R18; Ret | SUR; R19; C | SUR; R20; 6 | SUR; R21; 5 | ADE; R22; 6 | ADE; R23; 10 | ADE; R24; 4 | | | **2nd** | **981** |
| 2026 | McElrea Racing | Porsche 992 GT3 Cup | ALB; R1; 3 | ALB; R2; 3 | ALB; R3; 1 | HID; R4; 3 | HID; R5; 1 | QLD; R6; 1 | QLD; R7; 1 | BEN; R8; 1 | BEN; R9; C | BAT; R10; 1 | BAT; R11; 3 | BAT; R12; 1 | SUR; R13; 1 | SUR; R14; 2 | SUR; R15; 1 | ADE; R16 | ADE; R17 | ADE; R18 | | | | | | | | | **1st*** | **869*** |

=== Complete Porsche Carrera Cup Germany results ===
(key) (Races in bold indicate pole position) (Races in italics indicate fastest lap)

| Year | Team | 1 | 2 | 3 | 4 | 5 | 6 | 7 | 8 | 9 | 10 | 11 | 12 | 13 | 14 | 15 | 16 | DC | Points |
|---|---|---|---|---|---|---|---|---|---|---|---|---|---|---|---|---|---|---|---|
| 2023 | Scherer Sport PHX | SPA; 1; 5 | SPA; 2; 7 | HOC1; 1; 25 | HOC1; 2; 6 | ZAN; 1; 15 | ZAN; 2; 10 | NÜR; 1; 14 | NÜR; 2 DSQ | LAU; 1; 15 | LAU; 2; 11 | SAC; 1; 11 | SAC; 2; 8 | RBR; 1; 9 | RBR; 2 Ret | HOC2; 1; 16 | HOC2; 2; 6 | 12th | 75 |

=== Complete Porsche Supercup results ===
(key) (Races in bold indicate pole position) (Races in italics indicate fastest lap)

| Year | Team | 1 | 2 | 3 | 4 | 5 | 6 | 7 | 8 | Pos. | Points |
|---|---|---|---|---|---|---|---|---|---|---|---|
| 2023 | BWT Lechner Racing | MON; 9 | RBR; Ret | SIL; 7 | HUN; 6 | SPA; 6 | ZND; 10 | ZND; 12 | MNZ; 4 | 9th | 63 |

=== Supercars Championship results ===
Supercars results
| Year | Team | No. | Car | 1 | 2 | 3 | 4 | 5 | 6 | 7 | 8 | 9 | 10 | 11 | 12 | 13 | 14 | 15 | 16 | 17 | 18 | 19 | 20 | 21 | 22 | 23 | 24 | 25 | 26 | 27 | 28 | 29 | 30 | 31 | 32 | 33 | 34 | 35 | 36 | 37 | Position | Points |
|---|---|---|---|---|---|---|---|---|---|---|---|---|---|---|---|---|---|---|---|---|---|---|---|---|---|---|---|---|---|---|---|---|---|---|---|---|---|---|---|---|---|---|
| 2025 | Team 18 | 18 | Chevrolet Camaro ZL1 | SYD; R1 | SYD; R2 | SYD; R3 | MEL; R4 | MEL; R5 | MEL; R6 | MEL; R7 | TAU; R8 | TAU; R9 | TAU; R10 | SYM; R11 | SYM; R12 | SYM; R13 | BAR; R14 | BAR; R15 | BAR; R16 | HID; R17 | HID; R18 | HID; R19 | TOW; R20 | TOW; R21 | TOW; R22 | QLD; R23 | QLD; R24 | QLD; R25 | BEN; R26; 10 | BAT; R27; 20 | SUR; R28 | SUR; R29 | SAN; R30 | SAN; R31 | ADE; R32 | ADE; R33 | ADE; R34 | | | | 35th | 204 |
| 2026 | Matt Stone Racing | 4 | Chevrolet Camaro ZL1 | SMP; R1 | SMP; R2 | SMP; R3 | MEL; R4 | MEL; R5 | MEL; R6 | MEL; R7 | TAU; R8 | TAU; R9 | CHC; R10 | CHC; R11 | CHC; R12 | CHC; R13 | SYM; R14 | SYM; R15 | SYM; R16 | HID; R17 | HID; R18 | HID; R19 | TOW; R20 | TOW; R21 | TOW; R22 | BAR; R23 | BAR; R24 | BAR; R25 | QLD; R26 | QLD; R27 | QLD; R28 | BEN; R29; 11 | BAT; R30; 4 | SUR; R31 | SUR; R32 | SAN; R33 | SAN; R34 | ADE; R35 | ADE; R36 | ADE; R37 | 29th* | 376* |
