= 2021 Porsche Carrera Cup Australia =

Automobiles competition

The 2021 Porsche Paynter Dixon Carrera Cup Australia, was the seventeenth running of the Porsche Carrera Cup Australia motor racing series. It began at Sandown Raceway on March 19 and ended at Mount Panorama Circuit Bathurst on December 5.

The season's series was won by Cameron Hill.

== Calendar ==
Round	Circuit	Date	Class	Round winner
1	(Victoria (state)) Sandown Raceway (Melbourne, Victoria)	19–21 March	P	(Australia) Cameron Hill
1	(Victoria (state)) Sandown Raceway (Melbourne, Victoria)	19–21 March	PA	(Australia) Stephen Grove
2	The Bend Motorsport Park (Tailem Bend, South Australia)	8-9 May	P	(Australia) Cameron Hill
2	The Bend Motorsport Park (Tailem Bend, South Australia)	8-9 May	PA	(Victoria (state)) Geoff Emery
3	Townsville Street Circuit (Townsville, Queensland)	9-11 July	P	(Victoria (state)) Cooper Murray
3	Townsville Street Circuit (Townsville, Queensland)	9-11 July	PA	(Victoria (state)) Geoff Emery
4	Mount Panorama Circuit (Bathurst, New South Wales)	1-5 December	P	(New South Wales) David Wall
4	Mount Panorama Circuit (Bathurst, New South Wales)	1-5 December	PA	(South Australia) Sam Shahin
5	Mount Panorama Circuit (Bathurst, New South Wales)	1-5 December	P	(Victoria (state)) Cooper Murray
5	Mount Panorama Circuit (Bathurst, New South Wales)	1-5 December	PA	(South Australia) Sam Shahin

== Teams and drivers ==
Team	Class	No.	Driver	Rounds
Grove Racing	PA	4	(Australia) Stephen Grove	1
McElrea Racing	PA	7	(New Zealand) Tim Miles	1–4
McElrea Racing	P	11	(Australia) Jackson Walls	1–2
McElrea Racing	P	12	(Australia) Harri Jones	1–2
McElrea Racing	P	36	(Australia) Cooper Murray	1–2
McElrea Racing	P	76	(Australia) Christian Pancione	1–2
Porsche Centre Melbourne	P	8	(Australia) Nick McBride	1–2
Porsche Centre Melbourne	PA	9	(Australia) Marc Cini	1–2
Buik Motorsports	PA	13	(Australia) Sam Shahin	1–2
Agas National	PA	20	(Australia) Adrian Flack	1–2
Earl Bamber Motorsport	P	17	(New Zealand) Callum Hedge	4–5
Earl Bamber Motorsport	P	21	(New Zealand) Matthew Payne	1–2
Earl Bamber Motorsport	P	82	(New Zealand) Madeline Stewart	4–5
Ashley Seward Motorsport	PA	22	(Australia) Dean Cook	2
Ashley Seward Motorsport	PA	48	(Australia) Geoff Emery	1–2
Ashley Seward Motorsport	P	100	(Australia) Dale Wood	1–2
Ashley Seward Motorsport	PA	222	(Australia) Scott Taylor	1–2
Lago Racing	P	23	(Australia) David Russell	1–2
Tekworkx Motorsport	P	28	(Australia) Luke Youlden	1–2
Garth Walden Racing	PA	35	(Australia) Indiran Padayachee	1–2
Wall Racing	P	38	(Australia) David Wall	1–2
Wall Racing	PA	86	(Australia) Drew Hall	2
Wall Racing	P	338	(Australia) Craig Lowndes	1–2
Dutton EMA Motorsport	PA	74	(Australia) Benjamin Stack	1–2
Sonic Motor Racing Services	P	77	(Australia) Michael Almond	1–2
Sonic Motor Racing Services	P	78	(Australia) Aaron Love	1–2
Sonic Motor Racing Services	P	777	(Australia) Simon Fallon	1–2
CHE Racing	P	111	(Australia) Cameron Hill	1–2

== Summary ==
Rnd		Circuit	Date	Pole position	Fastest lap	Winning driver	Winning team	Winning Pro-Am
1	R1	(Victoria (state)) Sandown Raceway (Melbourne, Victoria)	19–21 March	(Queensland) Harri Jones	(Western Australia) Aaron Love	(South Australia) Michael Almond	Sonic Motor Racing Services	(Victoria (state)) Stephen Grove
1	R2	(Victoria (state)) Sandown Raceway (Melbourne, Victoria)	19–21 March		(Australian Capital Territory) Cameron Hill	(Australian Capital Territory) Cameron Hill	Cameron Hill Racing	(Victoria (state)) Stephen Grove
1	R3	(Victoria (state)) Sandown Raceway (Melbourne, Victoria)	19–21 March		(Victoria (state)) Craig Lowndes	(Australian Capital Territory) Cameron Hill	Cameron Hill Racing	(Queensland) Adrian Flack
2	R1	The Bend Motorsport Park (Tailem Bend, South Australia)	8–9 May	(New Zealand) Matthew Payne	(Australian Capital Territory) Cameron Hill	(Australian Capital Territory) Cameron Hill	Cameron Hill Racing	(Victoria (state)) Dean Cook
2	R2	The Bend Motorsport Park (Tailem Bend, South Australia)	8–9 May		(Australian Capital Territory) Cameron Hill	(Australian Capital Territory) Cameron Hill	Cameron Hill Racing	(Queensland) Adrian Flack
2	R3	The Bend Motorsport Park (Tailem Bend, South Australia)	8–9 May		(Victoria (state)) Cooper Murray	(Australian Capital Territory) Cameron Hill	Cameron Hill Racing	(South Australia) Sam Shahin
3	R1	Townsville Street Circuit (Townsville, Queensland)	9–11 July	(New Zealand) Matthew Payne	(Victoria (state)) Cooper Murray	(Australian Capital Territory) Cameron Hill	Cameron Hill Racing	(Victoria (state)) Stephen Grove
3	R2	Townsville Street Circuit (Townsville, Queensland)	9–11 July		(Victoria (state)) Cooper Murray	(Victoria (state)) Cooper Murray	McElrea Racing	(Victoria (state)) Geoff Emery
3	R3	Townsville Street Circuit (Townsville, Queensland)	9–11 July		(Australian Capital Territory) Cameron Hill	(New Zealand) Matthew Payne	Earl Bamber Motorsport	(Victoria (state)) Geoff Emery
4	R1	Mount Panorama Circuit (Bathurst, New South Wales)	1-5 December	(New South Wales) David Wall	(Western Australia) Aaron Love	(New South Wales) David Wall	Wall Racing	(South Australia) Sam Shahin
4	R2	Mount Panorama Circuit (Bathurst, New South Wales)	1-5 December		(New South Wales) David Wall	(New South Wales) David Wall	Wall Racing	(South Australia) Sam Shahin
5	R1	Mount Panorama Circuit (Bathurst, New South Wales)	1-5 December	(Queensland) Harri Jones	(New South Wales) David Wall	(Queensland) Harri Jones	McElrea Racing	(South Australia) Sam Shahin
5	R2	Mount Panorama Circuit (Bathurst, New South Wales)	1-5 December		(Victoria (state)) Cooper Murray	(Victoria (state)) Cooper Murray	McElrea Racing	(South Australia) Sam Shahin

== Standings ==
=== Pro Championship ===
Pos.	Driver	No.	(Victoria (state)) SAN			(South Australia) BEN			(Queensland) TOW			(New South Wales) BAT				Pen	Points
1	(Australian Capital Territory) Cameron Hill	111	2	1	1	1	1	1	1	2	4	2	2	3	19	0	672
2	(Victoria (state)) Cooper Murray	36	3	2	12	18	9	4	4	1	2	4	4	2	1	0	571
3	(Queensland) Harri Jones	12	11	11	8	2	2	2	7	5	5	5	5	1	3	0	534
4	(New South Wales) David Wall	38	6	8	2	3	4	5	2	11	9	1	1	14	7	15	499
5	(Western Australia) Aaron Love	78	4	4	3	7	Ret	12	Ret	7	3	3	3	4	2	0	497
6	(New Zealand) Matthew Payne	21	12	10	16	Ret	5	3	10	3	1	15	9	5	4	20	362
7	(Queensland) David Russell	23	9	14	17	Ret	DNS	DNS	3	4	7	10	8	6	5	0	334
8	(Victoria (state)) Craig Lowndes	338	7	3	19	9	7	6	5	Ret	DNS	6	6	7	20	0	317
9	(Victoria (state)) Christian Pancione	76	10	6	6	11	11	9	6	9	12	11	7	10	10	0	300
10	(New South Wales) Jackson Walls	11	13	9	10	8	10	11	WD	WD	WD	12	10	8	6	0	265
11	(South Australia) Michael Almond	77	1	12	7	Ret	13	10	9	6	10	8	DNS	DNS	DNS	0	255
12	(Victoria (state)) Nick McBride	8	8	7	5	6	23	15	13	12	11	7	Ret	DNS	DNS	0	299
13	(Victoria (state)) Dale Wood	100	5	23	4	Ret	8	14	Ret	8	6	13	11	Ret	13	15	198
14	(Queensland) Luke Youlden	28	Ret	5	9	4	6	8	Ret	10	8	WD	WD	WD	WD	10	195
15	(South Australia) Max Vidau	72	DNS	DNS	DNS	5	3	7	DNS	DNS	DNS	18	Ret	21	8	0	171
16	(Victoria (state)) Simon Fallon	777	14	13	Ret	10	12	13	8	Ret	Ret	9	Ret	DNS	DNS	50	88
Pos.	Driver	No.	(Victoria (state)) SAN			(South Australia) BEN			(Queensland) TOW			(New South Wales) BAT				Pen	Points

=== Pro–Am Championship ===
Pos.	Driver	No.	(Victoria (state)) SAN			(South Australia) BEN	(Queensland) TOW	(New South Wales) SYD	(Western Australia) PER	(New South Wales) BAT	TBC	(Queensland) SUR	Pen	Points
1	(Australia) Stephen Grove	4	1	1	2								0	174
2	(Australia) Sam Shanin	13	2	3	8	5							0	164
3	(Australia) Geoff Emery	48	Ret	5	3	2							0	149
4	(Australia) Marc Cini	9	5	7	6	4							0	139
5	(Australia) Adrian Flack	20	6	2	1	Ret							10	136
6	(Australia) Scott Taylor	222	Ret	6	5	3							0	116
7	(New Zealand) Tim Miles	7	3	Ret	4	Ret							0	90
8	(Australia) Benjamin Stack	74	4	4	Ret	Ret							0	84
9	(Australia) Indrian Padayachee	35	7	8	7	Ret							0	84
Pos.	Driver	No.	(Victoria (state)) SAN			(South Australia) BEN	(Queensland) TOW	(New South Wales) SYD	(Western Australia) PER	(New South Wales) BAT	TBC	(Queensland) SUR	Pen	Points

=== Junior Driver Championship ===
Pos.	Driver	No.	(Victoria (state)) SAN			(South Australia) BEN			(Queensland) TOW			Pen	Drop	Points
1	(Australia) Cooper Murray	36	3	2	12	18	8	4	4	1	2	0	76(BEN)	274
2	(Australia) Harri Jones	12	11	11	8	2	2	2	7	5	5	0	63(SAN)	263
3	(Australia) Aaron Love	78	4	4	3	7	Ret	12	Ret	7	3	0	45(BEN)	209
4	(New Zealand) Matthew Payne	21	12	10	16	Ret	5	3	10	3	1	10	46(SAN)	204
5	(Australia) Christian Pancione	76	10	6	6	11	10	9	6	9	12	0	61(BEN)	155
5	(Australia) Jackson Walls	11	13	9	10	8	9	11				0	0(TOW)	124
7	(Australia) Simon Fallon	777	16	13	Ret	10	11	13	8	Ret	Ret	0	26(SAN)	78
Pos.	Driver	No.	(Victoria (state)) SAN			(South Australia) BEN			(Queensland) TOW			Pen	Drop	Points

=== Endurance Cup Pro ===
Pos.	Driver	No.	(Victoria (state)) SAN	(South Australia) BEN	(Queensland) TOW	(New South Wales) SYD	(Western Australia) PER	(New South Wales) BAT	TBC	(Queensland) SUR	Pen	Points
1	(Australia) Cameron Hill	111	1								0	60
2	(Australia) Cooper Murray	36	2								0	54
3	(Australia) Craig Lowndes	338	3								0	48
4	(Australia) Aaron Love	78	4								0	42
5	(Australia) Luke Youlden	28	5								0	36
6	(Australia) Christian Pancione	76	6								0	32
7	(Australia) Nick McBride	8	7								0	29
8	(Australia) David Wall	38	8								0	26
9	(Australia) Jackson Walls	11	9								0	23
10	(New Zealand) Matthew Payne	21	10								0	20
11	(Australia) Harri Jones	12	11								0	18
12	(Australia) Michael Almond	77	12								0	16
13	(Australia) David Russell	23	14								0	12
14	(Australia) Dale Wood	100	23								0	3
Pos.	Driver	No.	(Victoria (state)) SAN	(South Australia) BEN	(Queensland) TOW	(New South Wales) SYD	(Western Australia) PER	(New South Wales) BAT	TBC	(Queensland) SUR	Pen	Points

=== Endurance Cup Pro–Am ===
Pos.	Driver	No.	(Victoria (state)) SAN	(South Australia) BEN	(Queensland) TOW	(New South Wales) SYD	(Western Australia) PER	(New South Wales) BAT	TBC	(Queensland) SUR	Pen	Points
1	(Australia) Stephen Grove	4	1								0	60
2	(Australia) Adrian Flack	20	2								0	54
3	(Australia) Sam Shahin	13	3								0	48
4	(Australia) Benjamin Stack	74	4								0	42
5	(Australia) Geoff Emery	48	5								0	36
6	(Australia) Scott Taylor	222	6								0	32
7	(Australia) Marc Cini	9	7								0	29
8	(Australia) Indrian Padayachee	35	8								0	26
9	(New Zealand) Tim Miles	7	Ret								0	0
Pos.	Driver	No.	(Victoria (state)) SAN	(South Australia) BEN	(Queensland) TOW	(New South Wales) SYD	(Western Australia) PER	(New South Wales) BAT	TBC	(Queensland) SUR	Pen	Points
