= 2023–24 Porsche Carrera Cup Middle East =

Motor racing competition

The 2023–24 Porsche Carrera Cup Middle East was the inaugural season of the Porsche Carrera Cup Middle East. The season began on 2 November at Bahrain International Circuit and finished on 9 March at Jeddah Corniche Circuit.

Theo Oeverhaus claimed the first Porsche Carrera Cup Middle East Drivers' Championship in Bahrain with two races in the season to spare.

== Calendar ==
Round	Circuit	Date	Supporting	Map of circuit locations
1	Bahrain International Circuit, Sakhir, Bahrain	2–4 November 2023	FIA World Endurance Championship	2023–24 Porsche Carrera Cup Middle East is located in Middle East
2	Bahrain International Circuit, Sakhir, Bahrain	15–16 December 2023	F4 Saudi Arabian Championship	2023–24 Porsche Carrera Cup Middle East is located in Middle East
3	Dubai Autodrome, Dubai, United Arab Emirates	20–21 January 2024		2023–24 Porsche Carrera Cup Middle East is located in Middle East
4	Yas Marina Circuit, Abu Dhabi, United Arab Emirates	27–28 January 2024		2023–24 Porsche Carrera Cup Middle East is located in Middle East
5	Bahrain International Circuit, Sakhir, Bahrain	29 February–2 March 2024	Formula One World Championship; Formula 2 Championship; FIA Formula 3 Championship	2023–24 Porsche Carrera Cup Middle East is located in Middle East
6	Jeddah Corniche Circuit, Jeddah, Saudi Arabia	7–9 March 2024	Formula One World Championship; Formula 2 Championship; F1 Academy	2023–24 Porsche Carrera Cup Middle East is located in Middle East

== Entry list ==
Team	No.	Driver	Class	Rounds
(Austria) BWT Junior Racing	1	(United Kingdom) Harry King	P	5–6
(Saudi Arabia) Saudi Racing	3	(Saudi Arabia) Saud Al Saud	PA R	All
(Saudi Arabia) Saudi Racing	23	(Saudi Arabia) Khaled Alahmadi	PA	All
(Netherlands) Team GP Elite	5	(Germany) Sören Spreng	PA	All
(Netherlands) Team GP Elite	14	(Netherlands) Huub van Eijndhoven	P R	5
(Netherlands) Team GP Elite	22	(Germany) Timo Recker	PA	1
(Netherlands) Team GP Elite	27	(Kyrgyzstan) Stanislav Minskiy	Am	5–6
(Netherlands) Team GP Elite	42	(France) Cédric Chassang	PA	All
(Austria) Central Europe Racing	7	(Austria) Charlie Wurz	P R	2
(Austria) Central Europe Racing	16	(Netherlands) Flynt Schuring	P R	1–2, 5–6
(Austria) Central Europe Racing	46	(Netherlands) Robert de Haan	P R	1, 5–6
(United Arab Emirates) Rabdan Motorsport	7	(United Arab Emirates) Saif Al Ameri	Am	5–6
(Australia) JW Racing	11	(Australia) Jackson Walls	P R	2–6
(Australia) Jones Motorsport	12	(Australia) Harri Jones	P	5
(Australia) The Bend Motorsport	13	(Australia) Sam Shahin	PA	4
(Canada) M3L Team	17	(Canada) Mark J. Thomas	Am	1
(China) Z.Speed	18	(China) Xuanyu Liu	PA	4
Team Bahrain	20	(Bahrain) Jaber Al-Khalifa	Am	5
Team Bahrain	66	(Bahrain) Salman bin Isa Al-Khalifa	Am	1
(United Kingdom) Porsche Junior GB	26	(United Kingdom) James Wallis	P R	4
(Bahrain) DHL Team	34	(Germany) Theo Oeverhaus	P R	All
(Germany) JS Racing	40	(Germany) Janne Stiak	P R	All
(Germany) FIRE Racing	55	(Germany) Colin Boenighausen	P R	All
(Germany) Baederprofis.de	56	(Germany) Klaus Boenighausen	Am	2
(Austria) Heizer Monkeys Racing	63	(Austria) Leo Willert	Am	2–4
(Poland) FA 1 Racing	69	(Poland) Franz Dziwok	Am	5
Team Kuwait	84	(Kuwait) Ahmad Al-Shehab	PA	1–3, 5–6
(Italy) R1SE Motorsport	88	(Italy) Sebastian Gorga	Am	1–3, 5–6
(Canada) Team BMR	89	(Canada) Bashar Mardini	PA	All
(Bahrain) One%	99	(Bahrain) Jaber Al-Khalifa	Am	1

Icon	Class
P	Pro
PA	Pro-Am
Am	Am
R	Rookie

== Race results ==
Round		Circuit	Pole position	Fastest lap	Overall winner	Winning team	Pro-Am Winner	Am Winner
1	R1	Bahrain International Circuit	(Netherlands) Robert de Haan	(Netherlands) Robert de Haan	(Germany) Theo Oeverhaus	(Bahrain) DHL Team	(Canada) Bashar Mardini	(Italy) Sebastian Gorga
1	R2	Bahrain International Circuit	(Germany) Theo Oeverhaus	(Netherlands) Robert de Haan	(Netherlands) Robert de Haan	(Austria) Central Europe Racing	(Kuwait) Ahmad Al-Shehab	(Bahrain) Jaber Al-Khalifa
2	R1	Bahrain International Circuit	(Germany) Theo Oeverhaus	(Germany) Theo Oeverhaus	(Germany) Theo Oeverhaus	(Bahrain) DHL Team	(Kuwait) Ahmad Al-Shehab	(Italy) Sebastian Gorga
2	R2	Bahrain International Circuit	(Germany) Theo Oeverhaus	(Germany) Theo Oeverhaus	(Germany) Theo Oeverhaus	(Bahrain) DHL Team	(Kuwait) Ahmad Al-Shehab	(Italy) Sebastian Gorga
3	R1	(United Arab Emirates) Dubai Autodrome	(Germany) Theo Oeverhaus	(Germany) Theo Oeverhaus	(Germany) Theo Oeverhaus	(Bahrain) DHL Team	(Kuwait) Ahmad Al-Shehab	None
3	R2	(United Arab Emirates) Dubai Autodrome	(Germany) Theo Oeverhaus	(Germany) Theo Oeverhaus	(Germany) Theo Oeverhaus	(Bahrain) DHL Team	(Canada) Bashar Mardini	(Italy) Sebastian Gorga
4	R1	(United Arab Emirates) Yas Marina Circuit	(Germany) Theo Oeverhaus	(Germany) Theo Oeverhaus	(Germany) Theo Oeverhaus	(Bahrain) DHL Team	(Saudi Arabia) Saud Al Saud	(Austria) Leo Willert
4	R2	(United Arab Emirates) Yas Marina Circuit	(Germany) Theo Oeverhaus	(Germany) Theo Oeverhaus	(Germany) Theo Oeverhaus	(Bahrain) DHL Team	(Saudi Arabia) Saud Al Saud	(Austria) Leo Willert
5	R1	Bahrain International Circuit	(Germany) Theo Oeverhaus	(Netherlands) Robert de Haan	(United Kingdom) Harry King	(Austria) BWT Junior Racing	(Saudi Arabia) Khaled Alahmadi	(Bahrain) Jaber Al-Khalifa
5	R2	Bahrain International Circuit	(Netherlands) Robert de Haan	(United Kingdom) Harry King	(Netherlands) Robert de Haan	(Austria) Central Europe Racing	(Germany) Sören Spreng	(United Arab Emirates) Saif Al Ameri
6	R1	(Saudi Arabia) Jeddah Corniche Circuit	(United Kingdom) Harry King	(United Kingdom) Harry King	(United Kingdom) Harry King	(Austria) BWT Junior Racing	(Canada) Bashar Mardini	(Italy) Sebastian Gorga
6	R2	(Saudi Arabia) Jeddah Corniche Circuit	(United Kingdom) Harry King	(United Kingdom) Harry King	(United Kingdom) Harry King	(Austria) BWT Junior Racing	(Saudi Arabia) Khaled Alahmadi	(United Arab Emirates) Saif Al Ameri

== Standings ==
=== Scoring system ===
Position	1st	2nd	3rd	4th	5th	6th	7th	8th	9th	10th	11th	12th	13th	14th	15th
Points	25	20	17	14	12	10	9	8	7	6	5	4	3	2	1

=== Overall ===
Pos.	Driver	Team	(Bahrain) BHR1		(Bahrain) BHR2		(United Arab Emirates) DUB		(United Arab Emirates) ABU		(Bahrain) BHR3		(Saudi Arabia) JED		Points
Pos.	Driver	Team	R1	R2	R1	R2	R1	R2	R1	R2	R1	R2	R1	R2	Points
1	(Germany) Theo Oeverhaus	(Bahrain) DHL Team	1	2	1	1	1	1	1	1	3	5	7	6	243
2	(Germany) Janne Stiak	(Germany) JS Racing	4	3	2	2	5	4	2	3	6	3	4	3	192
3	(Germany) Colin Boenighausen	(Germany) FIRE Racing	2	12	4	4	3	3	4	2	5	9	3	4	170
4	(Netherlands) Robert de Haan	(Austria) Central Europe Racing	3	1							2	1	2	2	127
5	(Australia) Jackson Walls	(Australia) JW Racing			7	5	2	2	3	5	9	7	5	7	127
6	(Netherlands) Flynt Schuring	(Austria) Central Europe Racing	5	5	3	3					4	8	6	5	102
7	(United Kingdom) Harry King	(Austria) BWT Junior Racing									1	2	1	1	95
8	(Germany) Sören Spreng	(Netherlands) Team GP Elite	7	7	9	8	6	12	9	9	11	10	10	10	85
9	(Saudi Arabia) Saud Al Saud	(Saudi Arabia) Saudi Racing	12	6	11	10	8	7	6	4	12	12	9	11	83
10	(Canada) Bashar Mardini	(Canada) Team BMR	6	13	8	9	7	5	7	8	Ret	18	8	9	81
11	(Kuwait) Ahmad Al-Shehab	Team Kuwait	8	4	5	7	4	6			Ret	20	Ret	WD	67
12	(Saudi Arabia) Khaled Alahmadi	(Saudi Arabia) Saudi Racing	9	14	10	15	10	11	8	6	10	11	Ret	8	63
13	(France) Cédric Chassang	(Netherlands) Team GP Elite	11	10	12	11	9	10	10	11	16	15	11	12	55
14	(Italy) Sebastian Gorga	(Italy) R1SE Motorsport	10	15	13	12	Ret	8			14	14	12	14	32
15	(Australia) Harri Jones	(Australia) Jones Motorsport									8	4			22
16	(United Kingdom) James Wallis	(United Kingdom) Porsche Junior GB							5	7					21
17	(Austria) Charlie Wurz	(Austria) Central Europe Racing			6	6									20
18	(Netherlands) Huub van Eijndhoven	(Netherlands) Team GP Elite									7	6			19
19	(Austria) Leo Willert	(Austria) Heizer Monkeys Racing			14	13	Ret	9	13	13					19
20	(Bahrain) Jaber Al-Khalifa	(Bahrain) One%	14	8											13
20	(Bahrain) Jaber Al-Khalifa	Team Bahrain									13	16			13
21	(Australia) Sam Shahin	(Australia) The Bend Motorsport							11	10					11
22	(Bahrain) Salman bin Isa Al-Khalifa	Team Bahrain	13	9											10
23	(United Arab Emirates) Saif Al Ameri	(United Arab Emirates) Rabdan Motorsport									15	13	13	13	10
24	(China) Xuanyu Liu	(China) Z-speed							12	12					8
25	(Canada) Mark J. Thomas	(Canada) M3L Team	16	11											5
26	(Kyrgyzstan) Stanislav Minskiy	(Netherlands) Team GP Elite									18	19	14	15	3
27	(Germany) Klaus Boenighausen	(Germany) Baederprofis.de			15	14									3
28	(Germany) Timo Recker	(Netherlands) Team GP Elite	15	Ret											1
29	(Poland) Franz Dziwok	(Poland) FA 1 Racing									17	17			0

=== Pro-Am ===
Pos.	Driver	Team	(Bahrain) BHR1		(Bahrain) BHR2		(United Arab Emirates) DUB		(United Arab Emirates) ABU		(Bahrain) BHR3		(Saudi Arabia) JED		Points
Pos.	Driver	Team	R1	R2	R1	R2	R1	R2	R1	R2	R1	R2	R1	R2	Points
1	(Germany) Sören Spreng	(Netherlands) Team GP Elite	2	3	3	2	2	6	4	4	2	1	3	3	213
2	(Canada) Bashar Mardini	(Canada) Team BMR	1	5	2	3	3	1	2	3	Ret	5	1	2	210
3	(Saudi Arabia) Saud Al Saud	(Saudi Arabia) Saudi Racing	6	2	5	4	4	3	1	1	3	3	2	4	202
4	(Saudi Arabia) Khaled Alahmadi	(Saudi Arabia) Saudi Racing	4	6	4	6	6	5	3	2	1	2	Ret	1	175
5	(France) Cédric Chassang	(Netherlands) Team GP Elite	5	4	6	5	5	4	5	6	4	4	4	5	153
6	(Kuwait) Ahmad Al-Shehab	Team Kuwait	3	1	1	1	1	2			Ret	6	Ret	WD	147
7	(Australia) Sam Shahin	(Australia) The Bend Motorsport							6	5					22
8	(China) Xuanyu Liu	(China) Z-speed							7	7					18
9	(Germany) Timo Recker	(Netherlands) Team GP Elite	7	Ret											9

=== Am ===
Pos.	Driver	Team	(Bahrain) BHR1		(Bahrain) BHR2		(United Arab Emirates) DUB		(United Arab Emirates) ABU		(Bahrain) BHR3		(Saudi Arabia) JED		Points
Pos.	Driver	Team	R1	R2	R1	R2	R1	R2	R1	R2	R1	R2	R1	R2	Points
1	(Italy) Sebastian Gorga	(Italy) R1SE Motorsport	1	4	1	1	Ret	1			2	2	1	2	199
2	(Austria) Leo Willert	(Austria) Heizer Monkeys Racing			2	2	Ret	2	1	1					110
3	(United Arab Emirates) Saif Al Ameri	(United Arab Emirates) Rabdan Motorsport									3	1	2	1	87
4	(Bahrain) Jaber Al-Khalifa	(Bahrain) One%	3	1											84
4	(Bahrain) Jaber Al-Khalifa	Team Bahrain									1	3			84
5	(Kyrgyzstan) Stanislav Minskiy	(Netherlands) Team GP Elite									5	5	3	3	58
6	(Bahrain) Salman bin Isa Al-Khalifa	Team Bahrain	2	2											40
7	(Germany) Klaus Boenighausen	(Germany) Baederprofis.de			3	3									34
8	(Canada) Mark J. Thomas	(Canada) M3L Team	4	3											31
9	(Poland) Franz Dziwok	(Poland) FA 1 Racing									4	4			28

=== Rookie ===
Pos.	Driver	Team	(Bahrain) BHR1		(Bahrain) BHR2		(United Arab Emirates) DUB		(United Arab Emirates) ABU		(Bahrain) BHR3		(Saudi Arabia) JED		Points
Pos.	Driver	Team	R1	R2	R1	R2	R1	R2	R1	R2	R1	R2	R1	R2	Points
1	(Germany) Theo Oeverhaus	(Bahrain) DHL Team	1	2	1	1	1	1	1	1	3	5	7	6	243
2	(Germany) Janne Stiak	(Germany) JS Racing	4	3	2	2	5	4	2	3	6	3	4	3	192
3	(Germany) Colin Boenighausen	(Germany) FIRE Racing	2	12	4	4	3	3	4	2	5	9	3	4	170
4	(Netherlands) Robert de Haan	(Austria) Central Europe Racing	3	1							2	1	2	2	127
5	(Australia) Jackson Walls	(Australia) JW Racing			6	5	2	2	3	5	9	7	5	7	127
6	(Netherlands) Flynt Schuring	(Austria) Central Europe Racing	5	4	3	3					4	8	6	5	102
7	(Saudi Arabia) Saud Al Saud	(Saudi Arabia) Saudi Racing	6	5	7	7	8	7	6	4	12	12	9	11	83
8	(United Kingdom) James Wallis	(United Kingdom) Porsche Junior GB							5	7					21
9	(Austria) Charlie Wurz	(Austria) Central Europe Racing			5	6									20
10	(Netherlands) Huub van Eijndhoven	(Netherlands) Team GP Elite									7	6			19

=== Teams ===
Pos.	Team	Points
1	(Netherlands) Team GP Elite	158
2	(Saudi Arabia) Saudi Racing	146
