= Bayley Hall =

Australian racing driver (born 2003)

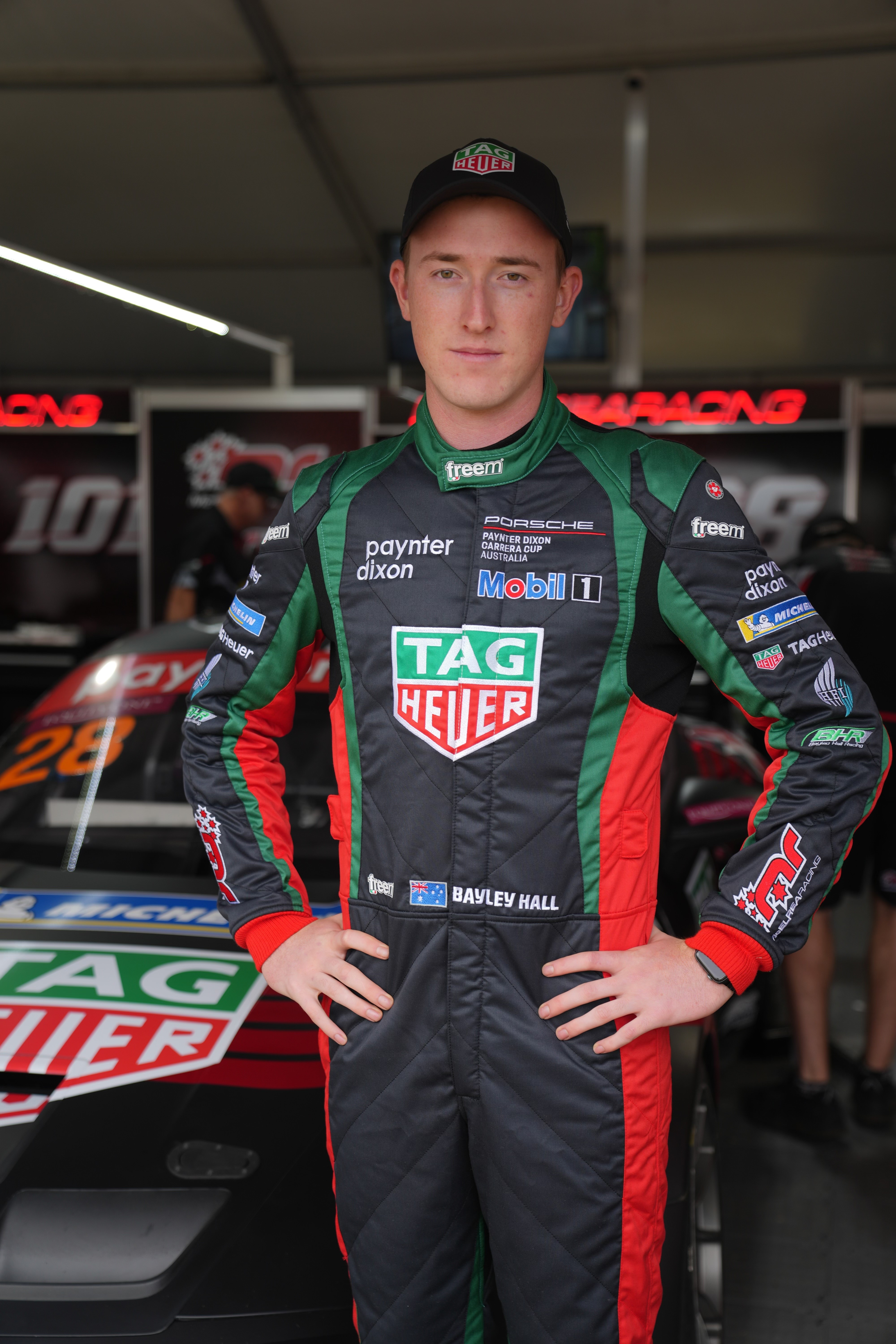
- Hall in 2023
- Nationality: (Australia) Australian
- Born: Bayley Roy Hall; 28 July 2003 (age 23) Gold Coast, Queensland, Australia
- Categorisation: FIA Silver

Championship titles
- 2025 2021 2020 2020: Porsche Carrera Cup Australia – Junior; Townsville Tin Tops – Porsche; Townsville Tin Tops – Super Touring; The Bend Super Tin Tops – Super Touring

Bayley Roy Hall (born 28 July 2003) is an Australian racing driver who is competing in the Super2 Series for Eggleston Motorsport.

== Career ==
Hall made his car racing debut in 2017, racing in the Keema Cars Excel Cup. Across the following two years, Hall primarily raced in Queensland-based touring car series, as well as making one-off appearances in the SuperUtes Series and the Australian GT Championship in the latter year.

In 2020, Hall made his Bathurst 12 Hour debut with GJ Motorsport in the Invitational class. For the rest of the year, Hall raced in Aussie Tin Tops, taking round wins at Townsville and Tailem Bend. At the end of the year, Hall tested Porsche Carrera Cup machinery for McElrea Racing. The following year, Hall joined the team to race in Porsche Sprint Challenge Australia, taking a lone podium at Phillip Island as he ended the year fifth in the Pro points. Stepping up to Porsche Carrera Cup Australia for 2022 with the same team, Hall took a best result of seventh at Townsville en route to a 19th-place points finish.

Continuing with McElrea Racing for 2023 as a member of the Porsche Junior Programme Australia, Hall took his first two series wins at Surfers Paradise, helping him end the year sixth in points. In late 2023, Hall also raced in the last two rounds of Porsche Carrera Cup North America for the same team.

Remaining in Carrera Cup competition for 2024, Hall stayed with McElrea Racing to race in Porsche Carrera Cup Australia, as well as racing for BeDriver in Porsche Carrera Cup Italy. In the former, Hall won all three races at Surfers Paradise and race two at Adelaide to end the year fifth in points. In the latter, Hall took a best result of second in race one at Vallelunga as he rounded out the season 11th in points.

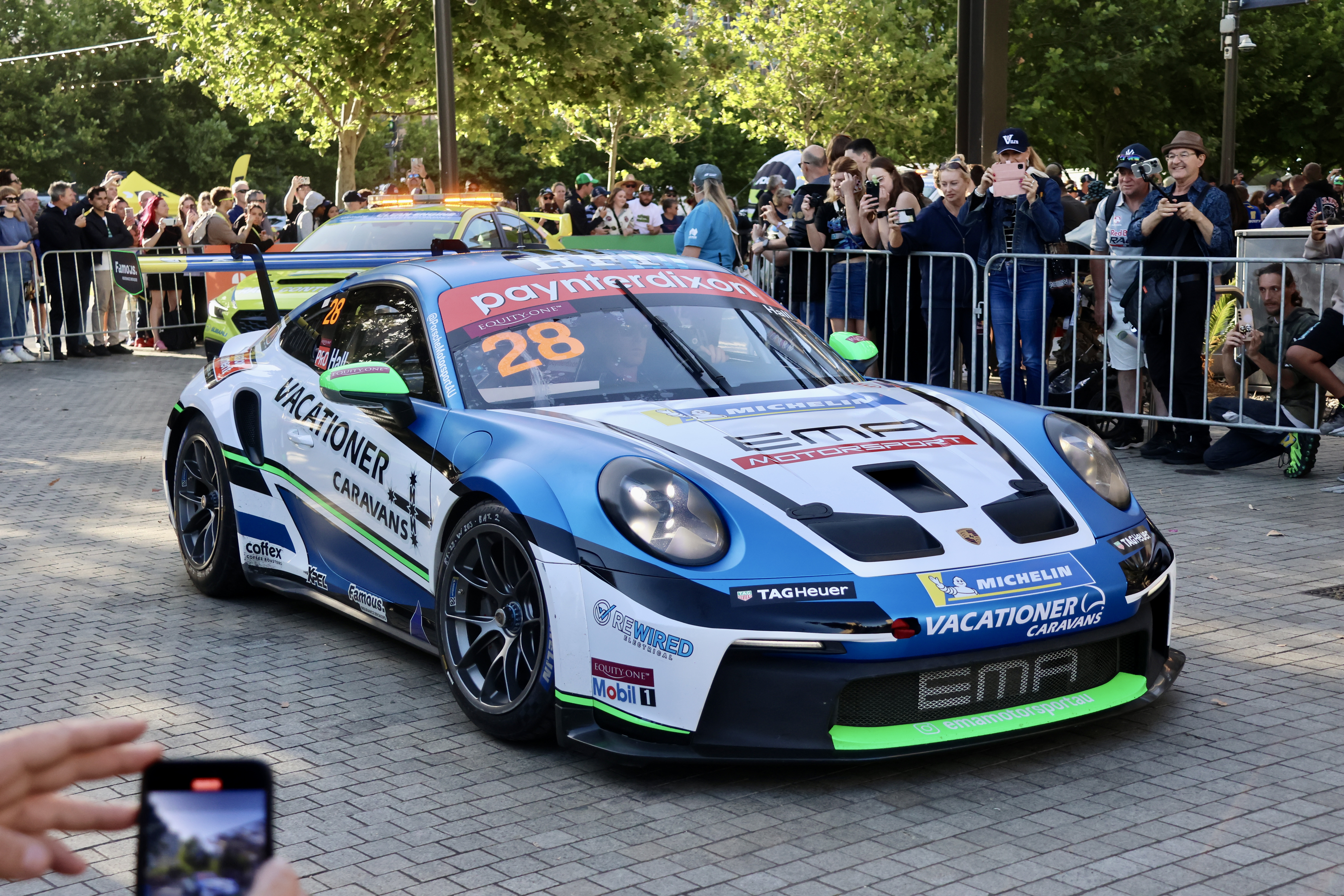
Hall's Porsche 911 GT3 Cup at the 2025 Adelaide 500 parade.

Switching to EMA Motorsport for his fourth season in Porsche Carrera Cup Australia, Hall took his only two wins of the season at Surfers Paradise to end the year fourth in the Pro standings, whilst also clinching the Junior title. During 2025, Hall also made one-off appearances in the Asian and Italian series for EBM and Target Competition respectively, as well as racing in the 12 Hours of Malaysia's 992 Pro class for Mühlner Motorsport.

Hall then began 2026 by racing in the Bathurst 12 Hour for Volante Rosso Motorsport, before joining Eggleston Motorsport to race in the Super2 Series. Hall also made his debut in the Supercars Championship in 2026, racing in the endurance rounds for Team 18 as Craig Lowndes' co-driver. During 2026, Hall also raced at the 24 Hours of Spa for Porsche-fielding Mühlner Motorsport.

== Racing record ==
=== Racing career summary ===
| Season | Series | Team | Races | Wins | Poles | F/Laps | Podiums | Points | Position |
|---|---|---|---|---|---|---|---|---|---|
| 2017 | Keema Cars Excel Cup | | 1 | 0 | 0 | 0 | 0 | 1 | 55th |
| 2018 | Queensland Hyundai X3 Series | | 11 | 0 | 0 | 0 | 0 | 31 | 28th |
| 2018 | Queensland Sports Sedan Championship | | 4 | 0 | 0 | 0 | 0 | 40 | 9th |
| 2018 | Queensland X3 Series Invitational | | 3 | 0 | 0 | 0 | 0 | 2 | 24th |
| 2018 | Racer Industries Queensland Touring Car Championship – A2 | | 3 | 0 | 1 | 0 | 0 | 87 | 13th |
| 2019 | GT-1 Australia | GJ Motorsport | 6 | 0 | 0 | 0 | 1 | 324 | 10th |
| 2019 | Queensland Touring Car Championship – A1 | | 8 | 1 | 1 | 0 | 1 | 341 | 10th |
| 2019 | Queensland Touring Car Championship – A2 | | 6 | 3 | 2 | 3 | 4 | 0 | NC |
| 2019 | SuperUtes Series | Ranger Racing | 3 | 0 | 0 | 0 | 0 | 46 | 28th |
| 2019 | Australian GT Championship – Tropheo Challenge | MARC Cars Australia | 2 | 0 | 0 | 0 | 0 | 80 | 9th |
| 2019 | QR Sports and Sedans – Sedan | | 2 | 0 | 0 | 0 | 2 | 42 | 7th |
| 2020 | Bathurst 12 Hour – Invitational | GJ Motorsport | 1 | 0 | 0 | 0 | 0 | —N/a | DNF |
| 2020 | Australian GT Championship – Invitational | GJ Motorsport | 1 | 0 | 0 | 0 | 0 | 8 | NC |
| 2020 | Wake Up! Hostels Combined Sedans – Space Frame | Hall Finance & Insurance Solutions | 3 | 0 | 0 | 0 | 2 | 128 | **2nd** |
| 2020 | Townsville Tin Tops – Super Touring | MARC Cars Australia | 3 | 2 | 0 | 0 | 3 | 145 | **1st** |
| 2020 | The Bend Super Tin Tops – Super Touring | MARC Cars Australia | 3 | 2 | 1 | 3 | 3 | 145 | **1st** |
| 2021 | Hi-Tec Oils Bathurst 6 Hour – A2 | Bayley Hall Racing | 1 | 0 | 0 | 0 | 0 | —N/a | 6th |
| 2021 | Porsche Sprint Challenge Australia – Pro | McElrea Racing | 6 | 0 | 0 | 0 | 1 | 180 | 5th |
| 2021 | Townsville Tin Tops – Porsche | McElrea Racing | 2 | 2 | 1 | 2 | 2 | 100 | **1st** |
| 2022 | Porsche Carrera Cup Australia – Pro | McElrea Racing | 23 | 0 | 0 | 0 | 0 | 196 | 19th |
| 2023 | Porsche Carrera Cup Australia – Pro | McElrea Racing | 23 | 2 | 0 | 5 | 4 | 649 | 6th |
| 2023 | Porsche Carrera Cup North America – Pro | McElrea Racing | 4 | 0 | 0 | 0 | 0 | 13 | 22nd |
| 2024 | Porsche Carrera Cup Australia – Pro | McElrea Racing | 24 | 4 | 1 | 3 | 6 | 860 | 5th |
| 2024 | Porsche Carrera Cup Italy – Pro | BeDriver | 12 | 0 | 0 | 0 | 1 | 71 | 11th |
| 2025 | Porsche Carrera Cup Australia – Pro | EMA Motorsport | 23 | 2 | 0 | 1 | 7 | 814 | 4th |
| 2025 | Porsche Carrera Cup Italy – Pro | Target Competition | 2 | 0 | 0 | 0 | 0 | 11 | 27th |
| 2025 | Porsche Carrera Cup Asia – Pro | EBM | 2 | 0 | 0 | 0 | 2 | 0† | NC† |
| 2025–26 | 24H Series Middle East – 992 Pro | Mühlner Motorsport | 1 | 0 | 0 | 0 | 0 | 28 | NC |
| 2026 | Bathurst 12 Hour | Volante Rosso Motorsport | 1 | 0 | 0 | 0 | 0 | —N/a | DNF |
| 2026 | Super2 Series | Eggleston Motorsport | 4 | 0 | 0 | 0 | 1 | 390* | 7th* |
| 2026 | Supercars Championship | Team 18 | | | | | | * | * |
| 2026 | China GT Championship – GT3 | Climax Racing | | | | | | | |
| 2026 | China GT Championship – GT3 | Milwaukee by Climax Racing | | | | | | | |
| 2026 | GT World Challenge Europe Endurance Cup | Mühlner Motorsport | 1 | 0 | 0 | 0 | 0 | 0 | NC |
| 2026 | GT World Challenge Europe Endurance Cup – Bronze | Mühlner Motorsport | 1 | 0 | 0 | 0 | 0 | 2 | 39th |
| 2026 | Intercontinental GT Challenge | Mühlner Motorsport | 1 | 0 | 0 | 0 | 0 | 0 | NC |

^{†} As Hall was a guest driver, he was ineligible to score points.

=== Complete Porsche Carrera Cup Italia results ===
(key) (Races in bold indicate pole position) (Races in italics indicate fastest lap)

| Year | Team | 1 | 2 | 3 | 4 | 5 | 6 | 7 | 8 | 9 | 10 | 11 | 12 | Pos | Points |
|---|---|---|---|---|---|---|---|---|---|---|---|---|---|---|---|
| 2024 | BeDriver | MIS; 1; 13 | MIS; 2; 11 | IMO1; 1; 10 | IMO1; 2; 14 | MUG; 1; 14 | MUG; 2; 27 | IMO2; 1; 9 | IMO2; 2; 6 | VLL; 1; 2 | VLL; 2; 14 | MNZ; 1; 9 | MNZ; 2; 9 | 11th | 71 |
| 2025 | Target Competition | MIS1; 1 | MIS1; 2 | VLL; 1; 11 | VLL; 2; 10 | MUG; 1 | MUG; 2 | IMO; 1 | IMO; 2 | MIS2; 1 | MIS2; 2 | MNZ; 1 | MNZ; 2 | 27th | 11 |

=== Super2 Series results ===
(key) (Race results only)

Super2 Series results
| Year | Team | Car | 1 | 2 | 3 | 4 | 5 | 6 | 7 | 8 | 9 | 10 | 11 | 12 | Position | Points |
|---|---|---|---|---|---|---|---|---|---|---|---|---|---|---|---|---|
| 2026 | Eggleston Motorsport | Holden Commodore ZB | SMP; R1; 14 | SMP; R2; 12 | HID; R3; 2 | HID; R4; 4 | BAR; R5; 12 | BAR; R6; 6 | BAT; R9 | BAT; R10 | SAN; R7 | SAN; R8 | ADE; R11 | ADE; R12 | 7th* | 561* |

=== Supercars Championship results ===
Supercars results
| Year | Team | Car | 1 | 2 | 3 | 4 | 5 | 6 | 7 | 8 | 9 | 10 | 11 | 12 | 13 | 14 | 15 | 16 | 17 | 18 | 19 | 20 | 21 | 22 | 23 | 24 | 25 | 26 | 27 | 28 | 29 | 30 | 31 | 32 | 33 | 34 | 35 | 36 | 37 | Position | Points |
|---|---|---|---|---|---|---|---|---|---|---|---|---|---|---|---|---|---|---|---|---|---|---|---|---|---|---|---|---|---|---|---|---|---|---|---|---|---|---|---|---|---|
| 2026 | Team 18 | Chevrolet Camaro ZL1 | SYD; R1 | SYD; R2 | SYD; R3 | MEL; R4 | MEL; R5 | MEL; R6 | MEL; R7 | TAU; R8 | TAU; R9 | TAU; R10 | CHR; R11 | CHR; R12 | CHR; R13 | SYM; R14 | SYM; R15 | SYM; R16 | BAR; R17 | BAR; R18 | BAR; R19 | HID; R20 | HID; R21 | HID; R22 | TOW; R23 | TOW; R24 | TOW; R25 | QLD; R26 | QLD; R27 | QLD; R28 | BEN; R28 | BAT; R30 | SUR; R31 | SUR; R32 | SAN; R33 | SAN; R34 | ADE; R35 | ADE; R36 | ADE; R37 | – | – |

=== Complete GT World Challenge Europe results ===
==== GT World Challenge Europe Endurance Cup ====
(Races in bold indicate pole position) (Races in italics indicate fastest lap)

| Year | Team | Car | Class | 1 | 2 | 3 | 4 | 5 | 6 | 7 | Pos. | Points |
|---|---|---|---|---|---|---|---|---|---|---|---|---|
| 2026 | Mühlner Motorsport | Porsche 911 GT3 R (992.2) | Bronze | LEC | MNZ | SPA; 6H; 57 | SPA; 12H; 49 | SPA; 24H; 45 | NÜR | ALG | 39th | 2 |
