= 2022 Porsche Carrera Cup Australia =

Motorsport racing

The 2022 Porsche Paynter Dixon Carrera Cup Australia was the eighteenth running of the Porsche Carrera Cup Australia motor racing series. It began at Albert Park Circuit on April 7 and it ended at Surfers Paradise Street Circuit on October 30. This series marks the first time since 2015 that Porsche Carrera Cup Australia was held as a national championship. This year's series also marks the introduction of the Porsche 911 (992) GT3 Cup for use by all teams in the category.

The season's series was won by Harri Jones.

== Calendar ==
Round	Circuit	Date	Round Winner	
Round	Circuit	Date	Class	Driver
1	(Victoria (state)) Albert Park Circuit (Melbourne, Victoria)	7–10 April	P	(Australia) Max Vidau
1	(Victoria (state)) Albert Park Circuit (Melbourne, Victoria)	7–10 April	PA	(Australia) Geoff Emery
2	(Victoria (state)) Winton Motor Raceway (Winton, Victoria)	21–22 May	P	(Australia) Harri Jones
2	(Victoria (state)) Winton Motor Raceway (Winton, Victoria)	21–22 May	PA	(Australia) Matthew Belford
3	Hidden Valley Raceway (Darwin, Northern Territory)	17–19 June	P	(Australia) Dale Wood
3	Hidden Valley Raceway (Darwin, Northern Territory)	17–19 June	PA	(Australia) Liam Talbot
4	Reid Park Street Circuit (Townsville, Queensland)	8–10 July	P	(New Zealand) Callum Hedge
4	Reid Park Street Circuit (Townsville, Queensland)	8–10 July	PA	(Australia) Geoff Emery
5	The Bend Motorsport Park (Tailem Bend, South Australia)	29–31 July	P	(Australia) Aaron Love
5	The Bend Motorsport Park (Tailem Bend, South Australia)	29–31 July	PA	(Australia) Sam Shahin
6	(Victoria (state)) Sandown International Raceway (Springvale, Victoria)	19–21 August	P	(Australia) Aaron Love
6	(Victoria (state)) Sandown International Raceway (Springvale, Victoria)	19–21 August	PA	(Australia) Geoff Emery
7	Mount Panorama Circuit (Bathurst, New South Wales)	6–9 October	P	(Australia) Aaron Love
7	Mount Panorama Circuit (Bathurst, New South Wales)	6–9 October	PA	(Australia) Liam Talbot
8	Surfers Paradise Street Circuit (Gold Coast, Queensland)	28–30 October	P	(New Zealand) Callum Hedge
8	Surfers Paradise Street Circuit (Gold Coast, Queensland)	28–30 October	PA	(Australia) Dean Cook

== Entries ==
Team	No.	Driver	Rounds	Ref
Pro Class
(New Zealand) Earl Bamber Motorsport	5	(Australia) Ryan Suhle	All	
(New Zealand) Earl Bamber Motorsport	17	(New Zealand) Callum Hedge	All	
(New Zealand) Earl Bamber Motorsport	100	(Australia) Dale Wood	All	
(Australia) Sonic Motor Racing Services	6	(Australia) Angelo Mouzouris	All	
(Australia) Sonic Motor Racing Services	777	(Australia) Simon Fallon	All	
(Australia) Sonic Motor Racing Services	999	(Australia) Aaron Love	1, 4-8	
(Australia) Porsche Centre Melbourne	8	(Australia) Nick McBride	All	
(Australia) McElrea Racing	11	(Australia) Jackson Walls	All	
(Australia) McElrea Racing	12	(Australia) Harri Jones	All	
(Australia) McElrea Racing	28	(Australia) Bayley Hall	All	
(Australia) McElrea Racing	76	(Australia) Christian Pancione	All	
(Australia) Garth Walden Racing	25	(Australia) Michael Almond	1–6	
(Australia) Garth Walden Racing	45	(Australia) Duvashen Padayachee	1–4, 6-8	
(Australia) Garth Walden Racing	88	(Australia) Dylan O'Keeffe	All	
(Australia) Wall Racing	38	(Australia) David Wall	All	
(Australia) Tekworkx Motorsport	53	(Australia) Luke Youlden	All	
(Australia) Tekworkx Motorsport	72	(Australia) Max Vidau	All	
(Australia) EMA Motorsport	74	(Australia) David Russell	All	
(Australia) Tilton Racing	333	(Australia) Bradley Shiels	1–6	
Pro-Am Class
(Australia) Grove Racing	4	(Australia) Stephen Grove	1–4, 6-7	
(Australia) McElrea Racing	7	(New Zealand) Tim Miles	All	
(Australia) Porsche Centre Melbourne	9	(Australia) Marc Cini	All	
(Australia) Porsche Centre Melbourne	14	(Australia) Matthew Belford	All	
(Australia) Buik Motorsports	13	(Australia) Sam Shahin	All	
(New Zealand) Earl Bamber Motorsport	20	(Australia) Adrian Flack	2–8	
(New Zealand) Ashley Seward Motorsport	22	(Australia) Dean Cook	All	
(New Zealand) Ashley Seward Motorsport	48	(Australia) Geoff Emery	All	
(Australia) Wall Racing	27	(Australia) Liam Talbot	All	
(Australia) Wall Racing	86	(Australia) Drew Hall	1–2, 4-7	
(Australia) Garth Walden Racing	45	(South Africa) Indiran Padayachee	5	
(Australia) Sonic Motor Racing Services	77	(Australia) Rodney Jane	All	
(Australia) Keltic Racing	101	(United Kingdom) Tony Quinn	1–4	
(Australia) Scott Taylor Motorsport	222	(Australia) Scott Taylor	1–4, 6-8	
