= Cheryl Jones (paediatrician) =

Paediatrician and researcher

Professor Cheryl Jones FAHMS

Personal details
- Occupation: Paediatrician

Cheryl Jones is an Australian paediatric infectious disease physician and researcher. She has won several major awards and held significant leadership roles in several Australian universities.

Jones graduated from the University of Tasmania with a bachelor of medicine and surgery in 1987 and she became a fellow of the Royal Australasian College of Physicians (Paediatrics) in 1994. She completed a PhD at University of Sydney in 2020 on the 'Immune protection against latent herpes simplex virus type 2 infection by replication-defective mutants in a mouse model'.

Jones was Professor of Paediatrics and Deputy Dean of Sydney Medical School, University of Sydney from 2012 to 2017. In March 2017, Jones became Stevenson Chair of Paediatrics and Head of the Department of Paediatrics at Melbourne Medical School, University of Melbourne. In 2019, Jones became the first female Head of School and Dean for Sydney Medical School, University of Sydney. Jones became Chair of the AMC’s Assessment Committee in November 2023. In June 2024, she succeeded Vlado Perkovic to became the first female Dean of Medicine & Health at University of New South Wales, Australia.

Jones is a board member of the Ramsay Hospital Research Foundation. She is a specialist editorial adviser for the Medical Journal of Australia.

She is known for her research on herpes simplex and perinatal infections. Her work has been profiled in The Lancet Infectious Diseases.

== Awards ==
Professor Jones was elected as a fellow of the Australian Academy of Health & Medical Sciences in 2018.

Professor Jones was made a life member of the Australian Society for Infectious Diseases in 2022 for her contribution to Infectious diseases and her roles to the Australian Society of Infectious Diseases.
