= 2024 Porsche Carrera Cup Australia =

Australian motor racing competition

The 2024 Porsche Carrera Cup Australia Championship (Known for commercial reasons as the 2024 Porsche Paynter Dixon Carrera Cup Australia Championship) was the twentieth running of the Porsche Carrera Cup Australia Championship.

The series would be won by Harri Jones while the Pro-Am Championship would be won by Adrian Flack.

== Entry list ==
Entrant	No.	Driver	Class	Rounds
(Australia) TekworkX Motorsport	2	(Australia) David Russell	P	All
(Australia) TekworkX Motorsport	702	(Australia) Daniel Stutterd	PA	1
(Australia) Porsche Centre Melbourne	3	(New Zealand) Fabian Coulthard	P	All
(Australia) Porsche Centre Melbourne	12	(Australia) Harri Jones	P	All
(Australia) Porsche Centre Melbourne	19	(Australia) Scott Pye	P	1
(Australia) Grove Racing	4	(Australia) Stephen Grove	PA	4-8
(Australia) Grove Racing	87	(Australia) Garth Tander	P	4
(New Zealand) McElrea Racing	7	(Australia) Caleb Sumich	P	5, 7–8
(New Zealand) McElrea Racing	11	(Australia) Jackson Walls	P	All
(New Zealand) McElrea Racing	15	(New Zealand) Clay Osborne	P	7-8
(New Zealand) McElrea Racing	23	(Australia) Lockie Bloxsom	P	All
(New Zealand) McElrea Racing	28	(Australia) Bayley Hall	P	All
(New Zealand) McElrea Racing	101	(Australia) Ryder Quinn	P	All
(Australia) Melbourne Performance Centre	8	(Australia) Nick McBride	P	1, 4
(Australia) Melbourne Performance Centre	9	(Australia) Marc Cini	PA	1, 3, 5, 7–8
(Australia) Melbourne Performance Centre	14	(Australia) Matthew Belford	PA	1, 3–6, 8
(Australia) Buik Motorsports	13	(Australia) Sam Shahin	PA	1, 3, 5–8
(New Zealand) Earl Bamber Motorsport	20	(Australia) Adrian Flack	PA	All
(New Zealand) Earl Bamber Motorsport	81	(Australia) Tom McLennan	P	All
(New Zealand) Earl Bamber Motorsport	84	(New Zealand) Marco Giltrap	P	All
(New Zealand) Earl Bamber Motorsport	911	(Australia) Glen Wood	P	All
(New Zealand) Earl Bamber Motorsport	992	(Australia) Dale Wood	P	All
(Australia) RAM Motorsport	22	(Australia) Dean Cook	PA	1–2 4–5, 7–8
(Australia) RAM Motorsport	35	(South Africa) Indiran Padayachee	PA	1, 4, 7–8
(Australia) RAM Motorsport	88	(Australia) Dylan O'Keeffe	P	All
(New Zealand) Sam Filmore Motorsport	27	(New Zealand) Sam Filmore	PA	2
(Australia) Wall Racing	38	(Australia) David Wall	P	3-4, 6, 8
(Australia) Wall Racing	86	(Australia) Drew Hall	PA	6
(Australia) Sonic Motor Racing Services	77	(Australia) Rodney Jane	PA	1, 3–8
(Australia) Sonic Motor Racing Services	777	(Australia) Marcos Flack	P	All
(Australia) Sonic Motor Racing Services	880	(Australia) Harrison Goodman	P	All
(Australia) Sonic Motor Racing Services	999	(Australia) Angelo Mouzouris	P	All
(Australia) Ashley Seward Motorsport	85	(Australia) Matt Slavin	PA	All
(Australia) EMA Motorsport	90	(Australia) Zak Best	P	5
(Australia) MVA Racing	91	(Australia) Anthony DiMauro	PA	8
(New Zealand) Armstrong Motor Group	111	(New Zealand) Rick Armstrong	PA	2
(Australia) Scott Taylor Motorsport	222	(Australia) Nash Morris	P	All

Icon	Class
P	Pro
PA	Pro-Am

== Calendar ==
Rd	Circuit	Location	Date	Round Winner	
Rd	Circuit	Location	Date	Class	Driver
1	(Victoria (state)) Albert Park Circuit	Melbourne, Victoria		P	(Australia) Harri Jones
1	(Victoria (state)) Albert Park Circuit	Melbourne, Victoria		PA	(Australia) Adrian Flack
2	(New Zealand) Taupo Motorsport Park	Taupō, Waikato Region		P	(Australia) David Russell
2	(New Zealand) Taupo Motorsport Park	Taupō, Waikato Region		PA	(Australia) Adrian Flack
3	(Northern Territory) Hidden Valley Raceway	Darwin, Northern Territory		P	(Australia) Harri Jones
3	(Northern Territory) Hidden Valley Raceway	Darwin, Northern Territory		PA	(Australia) Adrian Flack
4	(New South Wales) Sydney Motorsport Park	Sydney, New South Wales		P	(Australia) Harri Jones
4	(New South Wales) Sydney Motorsport Park	Sydney, New South Wales		PA	(Australia) Adrian Flack
5	(Victoria (state)) Sandown Raceway	Melbourne, Victoria		P	(Australia) Harri Jones
5	(Victoria (state)) Sandown Raceway	Melbourne, Victoria		PA	(Australia) Adrian Flack
6	(New South Wales) Mount Panorama Circuit	Bathurst, New South Wales		P	(Australia) Harri Jones
6	(New South Wales) Mount Panorama Circuit	Bathurst, New South Wales		PA	
7	(Queensland) Surfers Paradise Street Circuit	Gold Coast, Queensland		P	(Australia) Bayley Hall
7	(Queensland) Surfers Paradise Street Circuit	Gold Coast, Queensland		PA	(Australia) Adrian Flack
8	(South Australia) Adelaide Street Circuit	Adelaide, South Australia		P	(Australia) Dale Wood
8	(South Australia) Adelaide Street Circuit	Adelaide, South Australia		PA	(Australia) Adrian Flack

== Results and standings ==
=== Season summary ===
==== Pro ====
Round		Circuit	Pole position	Fastest lap	Winning driver	Winning team
1	R1	(Victoria (state)) Albert Park Circuit	(Australia) Harri Jones	(Australia) Harri Jones	(Australia) Harri Jones	(Australia) Porsche Center Melbourne
1	R2	(Victoria (state)) Albert Park Circuit		(Australia) Harri Jones	(Australia) Harri Jones	(Australia) Porsche Center Melbourne
1	R3	(Victoria (state)) Albert Park Circuit		(Australia) Jackson Walls	(Australia) Marcos Flack	(Australia) Sonic Motor Racing Services
2	R1	(New Zealand) Taupo Motorsport Park	(Australia) David Russell	(Australia) Harri Jones	(Australia) David Russell	(Australia) TekworkX Motorsport
2	R2	(New Zealand) Taupo Motorsport Park		(Australia) Harri Jones	(Australia) David Russell	(Australia) TekworkX Motorsport
2	R3	(New Zealand) Taupo Motorsport Park		(Australia) Jackson Walls	(Australia) Jackson Walls	(New Zealand) McElrea Racing
3	R1	(Northern Territory) Hidden Valley Raceway	(Australia) Harri Jones	(Australia) Harri Jones	(Australia) Harri Jones	(Australia) Porsche Center Melbourne
3	R2	(Northern Territory) Hidden Valley Raceway		(Australia) Jackson Walls	(Australia) Harri Jones	(Australia) Porsche Center Melbourne
3	R3	(Northern Territory) Hidden Valley Raceway		(Australia) Harri Jones	(Australia) Harri Jones	(Australia) Porsche Center Melbourne
4	R1	(New South Wales) Sydney Motorsport Park	(Australia) Harri Jones	(Australia) Harri Jones	(Australia) Harri Jones	(Australia) Porsche Center Melbourne
4	R2	(New South Wales) Sydney Motorsport Park		(Australia) Jackson Walls	(Australia) Harri Jones	(Australia) Porsche Center Melbourne
4	R3	(New South Wales) Sydney Motorsport Park		(Australia) Harri Jones	(Australia) Harri Jones	(Australia) Porsche Center Melbourne
5	R1	(Victoria (state)) Sandown Raceway	(Australia) Harri Jones	(Australia) Harri Jones	(Australia) Harri Jones	(Australia) Porsche Center Melbourne
5	R2	(Victoria (state)) Sandown Raceway		(Australia) Jackson Walls	(Australia) Jackson Walls	(New Zealand) McElrea Racing
5	R3	(Victoria (state)) Sandown Raceway		(Australia) Harri Jones	(Australia) Harri Jones	(Australia) Porsche Center Melbourne
6	R1	(New South Wales) Mount Panorama Circuit	(Australia) Harri Jones	(Australia) Harri Jones	(Australia) Harri Jones	(Australia) Porsche Center Melbourne
6	R2	(New South Wales) Mount Panorama Circuit		(Australia) Harri Jones	(Australia) Harri Jones	(Australia) Porsche Center Melbourne
6	R3	(New South Wales) Mount Panorama Circuit		(Australia) Jackson Walls	(Australia) David Russell	(Australia) TekworkX Motorsport
7	R1	(Queensland) Surfers Paradise Street Circuit	(Australia) Bayley Hall	(Australia) Harri Jones	(Australia) Bayley Hall	(New Zealand) McElrea Racing
7	R2	(Queensland) Surfers Paradise Street Circuit		(Australia) Bayley Hall	(Australia) Bayley Hall	(New Zealand) McElrea Racing
7	R3	(Queensland) Surfers Paradise Street Circuit		(Australia) Harri Jones	(Australia) Bayley Hall	(New Zealand) McElrea Racing
8	R1	(South Australia) Adelaide Street Circuit	(Australia) Dale Wood	(Australia) Bayley Hall	(Australia) Dale Wood	(New Zealand) Earl Bamber Motorsport
8	R2	(South Australia) Adelaide Street Circuit		(Australia) Bayley Hall	(Australia) Bayley Hall	(New Zealand) McElrea Racing
8	R3	(South Australia) Adelaide Street Circuit		(Australia) Harri Jones	(Australia) Dale Wood	(New Zealand) Earl Bamber Motorsport

==== Pro-Am ====
Round		Circuit	Pole position	Winning driver	Winning team
1	R1	(Victoria (state)) Albert Park Circuit	(Australia) Dean Cook	(Australia) Rodney Jane	(Australia) Sonic Motor Racing Services
1	R2	(Victoria (state)) Albert Park Circuit		(Australia) Adrian Flack	(New Zealand) Earl Bamber Motorsport
1	R3	(Victoria (state)) Albert Park Circuit		(Australia) Adrian Flack	(New Zealand) Earl Bamber Motorsport
2	R1	(New Zealand) Taupo Motorsport Park	(Australia) Adrian Flack	(Australia) Adrian Flack	(New Zealand) Earl Bamber Motorsport
2	R2	(New Zealand) Taupo Motorsport Park		(Australia) Adrian Flack	(New Zealand) Earl Bamber Motorsport
2	R3	(New Zealand) Taupo Motorsport Park		(Australia) Adrian Flack	(New Zealand) Earl Bamber Motorsport
3	R1	(Northern Territory) Hidden Valley Raceway	(Australia) Adrian Flack	(Australia) Adrian Flack	(New Zealand) Earl Bamber Motorsport
3	R2	(Northern Territory) Hidden Valley Raceway		(Australia) Adrian Flack	(New Zealand) Earl Bamber Motorsport
3	R3	(Northern Territory) Hidden Valley Raceway		(Australia) Adrian Flack	(New Zealand) Earl Bamber Motorsport
4	R1	(New South Wales) Sydney Motorsport Park	(Australia) Adrian Flack	(Australia) Adrian Flack	(New Zealand) Earl Bamber Motorsport
4	R2	(New South Wales) Sydney Motorsport Park		(Australia) Adrian Flack	(New Zealand) Earl Bamber Motorsport
4	R3	(New South Wales) Sydney Motorsport Park		(Australia) Adrian Flack	(New Zealand) Earl Bamber Motorsport
5	R1	(Victoria (state)) Sandown Raceway	(Australia) Adrian Flack	(Australia) Adrian Flack	(New Zealand) Earl Bamber Motorsport
5	R2	(Victoria (state)) Sandown Raceway		(Australia) Matthew Belford	(Australia) Melbourne Performance Centre
5	R3	(Victoria (state)) Sandown Raceway		(Australia) Adrian Flack	(New Zealand) Earl Bamber Motorsport
6	R1	(New South Wales) Mount Panorama Circuit	(Australia) Adrian Flack	(Australia) Rodney Jane	(Australia) Sonic Motor Racing Services
6	R2	(New South Wales) Mount Panorama Circuit		(Australia) Adrian Flack	(New Zealand) Earl Bamber Motorsport
6	R3	(New South Wales) Mount Panorama Circuit		(Australia) Adrian Flack	(New Zealand) Earl Bamber Motorsport
7	R1	(Queensland) Surfers Paradise Street Circuit	(Australia) Adrian Flack	(Australia) Adrian Flack	(New Zealand) Earl Bamber Motorsport
7	R2	(Queensland) Surfers Paradise Street Circuit		(Australia) Adrian Flack	(New Zealand) Earl Bamber Motorsport
7	R3	(Queensland) Surfers Paradise Street Circuit		(Australia) Adrian Flack	(New Zealand) Earl Bamber Motorsport
8	R1	(South Australia) Adelaide Street Circuit	(Australia) Adrian Flack	(Australia) Adrian Flack	(New Zealand) Earl Bamber Motorsport
8	R2	(South Australia) Adelaide Street Circuit		(Australia) Adrian Flack	(New Zealand) Earl Bamber Motorsport
8	R3	(South Australia) Adelaide Street Circuit		(Australia) Adrian Flack	(New Zealand) Earl Bamber Motorsport

=== Standings ===
==== Pro ====
Pos.	Driver	No.	MEL			TAU			HID			SYD			SAN			BAT			SUR			ADE			Pen	Points
1	(Australia) Harri Jones	12	1	1	3	3	12	10	1	1	1	1	1	1	1	2	1	1	1	3	14	3	3	14	4	7	0	1150
2	(Australia) David Russell	2	8	Ret	4	1	1	2	4	14	6	3	5	3	5	5	7	2	2	1	3	2	2	Ret	3	Ret	0	934
3	(Australia) Dylan O'Keeffe	88	7	10	8	5	5	4	8	3	5	2	4	2	2	3	2	7	9	12	2	6	5	3	11	2	0	915
4	(Australia) Jackson Walls	11	10	12	2	8	2	1	2	4	3	Ret	2	4	6	1	3	5	4	9	9	4	Ret	2	6	3	0	910
5	(Australia) Bayley Hall	28	2	8	14	12	7	5	7	5	4	8	11	8	3	7	5	4	5	6	1	1	1	16	1	5	0	860
6	(Australia) Dale Wood	992	3	2	6	14	4	14	3	2	2	Ret	7	16	8	15	9	3	3	2	4	5	Ret	1	2	1	0	858
7	(New Zealand) Fabian Coulthard	3	9	11	Ret	7	6	7	5	6	7	11	3	6	4	6	4	9	6	4	12	8	4	9	16	14	30	638
8	(Australia) Nash Morris	222	14	17	9	4	3	3	15	11	9	13	9	10	7	4	6	10	7	Ret	Ret	9	12	8	12	8	0	550
9	(Australia) Angelo Mouzouris	999	15	13	11	2	9	6	9	13	16	7	10	7	10	14	12	11	16	10	5	Ret	6	4	9	4	0	548
10	(Australia) Ryder Quinn	101	4	3	5	6	14	8	Ret	9	10	6	13	9	16	9	8	13	12	8	6	7	7	Ret	15	17	0	533
11	(Australia) Glen Wood	911																									0	461
12	(Australia) Marcos Flack	777																									0	426
13	(New Zealand) Marco Giltrap	84																									0	411
14	(Australia) David Wall	38																									0	339
15	(Australia) Lochie Bloxsom	23																									30	291
16	(Australia) Tom McLennan	81																									0	272
17	(Australia) Harrison Goodman	880																									0	251
18	(Australia) Caleb Sumich	7																									0	139
19	(New Zealand) Clay Osborne	15																									0	120
20	(Australia) Nick McBride	8	Ret	5	12							12	12	19													0	91
21	(Australia) Scott Pye	19	Ret	4	7																						0	71
22	(Australia) Garth Tander	87																									0	65
Pos.	Driver	No.	MEL			TAU			HID			SYD			SAN			BAT			SUR			ADE			Pen	Points

==== Pro-Am ====
Pos.	Driver	No.	MEL			TAU			HID			SYD			SAN			BAT			SUR			ADE			Pen	Points
1	(Australia) Adrian Flack	20	2	1	1	1	1	1	1	1	1	1	1	1	1	7	1	6	1	1	1	1	1	1	1	1	0	1231
2	(Australia) Matt Slavin	85	6	6	Ret			3	3	2	3		3	6		3		2		2		3	3	2			0	915
3	(Australia) Rodney Jane	77	1	3	Ret				2	4	2	2		2	3			1	2		2	Ret					0	878
4	(Australia) Dean Cook	22			Ret	3	Ret					6	6			2	2				3	2	2	3	Ret	3	0	677
5	(Australia) Matthew Belford	14	3		Ret				5	3	4	3	2	3		1	3	Ret	3	Ret				Ret	3		0	619
6	(South Africa) Indiran Padayachee	35											Ret														0	342
7	(Australia) Sam Shahin	13	Ret	2	2										2			3						Ret			0	320
8	(Australia) Marc Cini	9																								Ret	0	306
9	(New Zealand) Sam Fillmore	27				2	2																				0	144
10	(New Zealand) Rick Armstrong	111					3	2																			0	144
11	(Australia) Drew Hall	86																		3							0	120
12	(Australia) Anthony DiMauro	91																								2	0	118
13	(Australia) Daniel Stutterd	702	Ret		3																						0	77
Pos.	Driver	No.	MEL			TAU			HID			SYD			SAN			BAT			SUR			ADE			Pen	Points
