= Vlado Perkovic =

- Education: University of Melbourne
- Occupations: -Dean of the Faculty of Medicine and Scientia Professor at the University of New South Wales -Renal Physician -Staff Specialist in Nephrology at the Royal North Shore Hospital -George Clinical Board Member -George Clinical Scientific Leader
- Employer(s): -Royal Melbourne Hospital (2002-2005) -Royal North Shore Hospital (2005-present) -George Institute for Global Health (2007-present) -George Clinical (2009–present) -University of Sydney (2012-2017) -University of New South Wales (2017-present)

Vlado Perkovic is an Australian renal physician and researcher who is the Provost at the University of New South Wales, Sydney, having previously been Dean of Medicine & Health at that University between 2019 and 2023.

He is also an Honorary Fellow at the George Institute for Global Health Australia, and a kidney disease researcher leading a number of international clinical trials.

== Early life and education ==
Perkovic was born in Brinje, Croatia and moved to Australia with his family before the age of one. He lived in Melbourne and trained in medicine at the University of Melbourne and the Royal Melbourne Hospital, receiving his MBBS and Doctor of Philosophy qualifications from the University of Melbourne in 1992 and 2005 respectively.

== Career ==
Perkovic moved to Sydney and into professional academia after completing his PhD in 2005. The thesis undertaken at the University of Melbourne was entitled "The Cardiovascular Aspects of Kidney Disease". Perkovic relocated to Sydney to take on a position as Associate Principal Director at The George Institute for Global Health (2007-2008), and was appointed Conjoint Senior Lecturer at the University of Sydney. Perkovic worked in a number of senior research and executive positions at The George Institute, before being appointed Executive Director of The George Institute, Australia in 2012. In 2017, Perkovic was appointed to lead the non-communicable diseases theme as part of the University of New South Wales Medicine's thematic research strategy. In 2019, he was appointed as the Dean of Medicine at University of New South Wales.

From 2009-2014, Perkovic was the executive director of George Clinical, one of The George Institute's commercial enterprises. He was appointed to the board of George Clinical in 2010 and held this position until 2023.

Perkovic regularly appears in the media worldwide as an authority in the fields of kidney disease, hypertension, cardiovascular disease, and clinical trials. His research is widely cited and has been responsible for changing medical guidelines.

Perkovic is a fellow of the Royal Australasian College of Physicians (1999), the American Society of Nephrology, (2008) and the Australian Academy of Health and Medical Sciences (2016). Some of his previous positions include being President of the Association of Australian Medical Research Institutes (AAMRI, the peak body for Medical Research Institutes), Chairman of the International Society of Nephrology Advancing Clinical Trials initiative (ISN-ACT 2016-), a member of the Executive Committee and Board of Australian Clinical Trials Alliance, (2016-8), a member of the Executive Operations Secretariat, Australasian Kidney Trials Network (2016-) and Chair of the AKTN Scientific Committee 2013-6. He was previously a member of the Health Translation Advisory Committee (HTAC) of the National Health and Medical Research Council (2015-8)

=== Research focus and publications ===
Perkovic has published more than 400 peer-reviewed papers, and his career has been based on clinical research investigating the prevention and treatment of kidney disease, and its complications. As well as epidemiological research identifying important risk factors, Perkovic has led a broad suite of clinical trials and meta-analyses aiming to identify effective interventions that slow the progression of kidney disease and reduce the risk of developing the many complications of kidney disease. Some of Perkovic's key outputs here have been work on diabetic nephropathy published in a range of journals, and studies of blood pressure lowering, lipid lowering and a range of other interventions for the prevention of kidney failure and cardiovascular outcomes in people with kidney disease. Perkovic's ongoing work includes further systematic reviews, large scale global trials of steroids for the prevention of kidney failure in IgA nephropathy (Co-Principal Investigator), and Steering Committee roles in a number of global, pharma-funded trials studying treatments for the prevention of kidney failure in diabetic nephropathy. This includes a role as Chair of the CREDENCE trial Steering Committee, the first trial to convincingly demonstrate the benefits of the SGLT2 inhibitor canagliflozin on the risk of kidney failure and cardiovascular outcomes in people with diabetes and kidney disease.

Perkovic's research has led to major publications in the New England Journal of Medicine, Lancet, BMJ, Annals of Internal Medicine, PLoS Medicine and a range of specialty journals. He was appointed to the Editorial Board of the New England Journal of Medicine in 2017, the first Australian to receive this honour.
