= Jackson Walls =

Australian racing driver (born 2003)

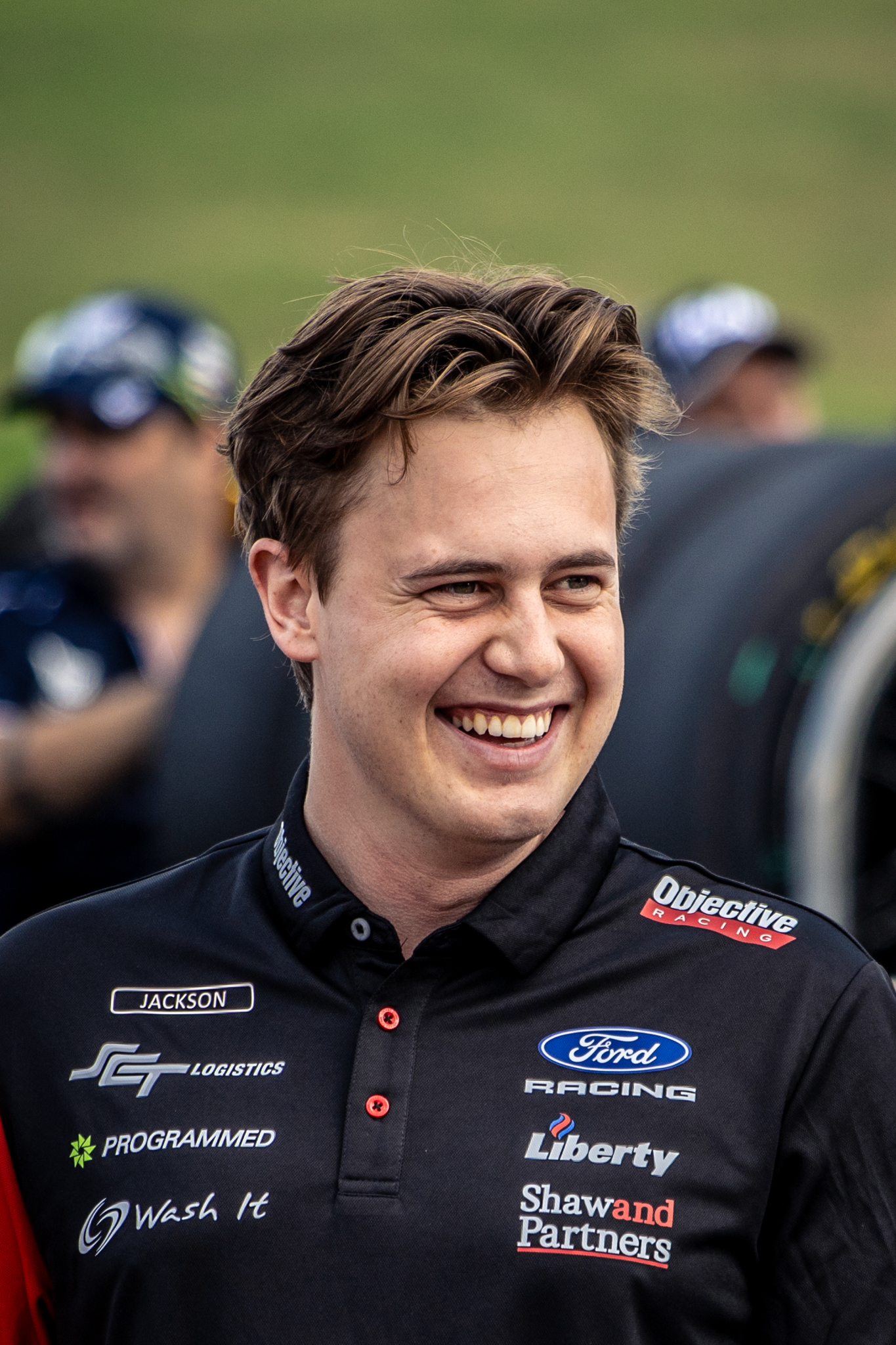
- Walls in 2026
- Nationality: Australia
- Born: Jackson Luke Walls; 17 January 2003 (age 23) Sydney, Australia

Repco Supercars Championship career
- Debut season: 2026
- Current team: Triple eight race engineering
- Car number: 11
- Starts: 25
- Wins: 0
- Poles: 0
- Fastest laps: 0
- Best finish: 11th in 2026

Previous series
- 2018-2019 2019 2019-20 2021-2025 Porsche Carrera Cup: Australian F4 Championship; F3 Asian Championship; Toyota Racing Series; Porsche Carrera Cup

Championship titles
- 2023: Runner up in 2023 Porsche Carrera Cup

Jackson Luke Walls (born 17 January 2003) is an Australian racing driver currently racing in the Supercars Championship driving the No. 11 Ford Mustang for Triple Eight Race Engineering.

== Career ==
=== Australian F4 Championship ===
In 2018, Walls jumped into a single seater car for the first time competitively with the Patrizicorse team in the Australian F4 Championship. A string of successful midfield results as well as three podium finishes put him sixth with 148. Walls returned for the next campaign and his results were similar to the previous year, he took his maiden career victory at Tailem Bend, Lochie Hughes who started on pole initially took the victory after taking the lead back from Walls. Contact with Ryan Suhle caused the stewards to award Hughes with a five seconds penalty, allowing Walls to take the top step of the podium.

=== F3 Asian Championship ===
Walls and Hitech Grand Prix joined forced for the final three rounds of the F3 Asian Championship season. Walls made an immediate impact when he finished on the podium for the second time of asking He scored the next podium at the season finale in Shanghai, 20 seconds behind race winner Jack Doohan. Ukyo Sasahara finished second that race meaning Hitech achieved that only 1-2-3 for that season. Walls finished the season sixth with 90 points.

=== Toyota Racing Series ===
Walls missed the opening round of the 2019 Toyota Racing Series as he was only fifteen years old. He finished the season 12th with a highest result of fifth coming at Hampton Downs. Walls returned to the mtec Motorsport seat for the 2020 season. Walls won his only race of the season at Pukekohe Park Raceway, he started on reverse grid pole an fought most of the race against Czech teammate Petr Ptáček.

== Personal life ==
Walls's father, Tony, is a racing driver competing in events such as the Australian GT Championship and Lamborghini Super Trofeo. Jackson Walls's manager Michael Patrizi is also a racing driver.

== Racing record ==
=== Career summary ===
Season	Series	Team	Races	Wins	Poles	F/laps	Podiums	Points	Position
2018	Australian Formula 4 Championship	Patrizicorse	21	0	0	0	3	146	6th
2019	Australian Formula 4 Championship	Patrizicorse	17	1	0	1	1	127	5th
2019	F3 Asian Championship	Hitech Grand Prix	9	0	0	0	2	90	6th
2019	Toyota Racing Series	MTEC Motorsport	12	0	0	0	0	110	12th
2020	Toyota Racing Series	mtec Motorsport	15	1	1	0	1	160	10th
2021	Porsche Carrera Cup Australia - Pro	McElrea Racing	10	0	0	0	0	265	10th
2022	Porsche Carrera Cup Australia - Pro	McElrea Racing	24	1	0	0	2	465	11th
2023	Porsche Carrera Cup Australia - Pro	McElrea Racing	20	1	0	4	11	905	**2nd**
2023	Lamborghini Super Trofeo Asia - Pro-Am	Bergwerk Motorsport	10	1	1	0	9	106	**2nd**
2023–24	Porsche Carrera Cup Middle East	JW Racing	10	0	0	0	3	127	5th
2024	Porsche Carrera Cup Australia - Pro	McElrea Racing	24	2	0	6	10	910	4th
2025	Super2 Series	Triple Eight Race Engineering	10	1	1	1	1	885	12th
2025	Porsche Carrera Cup Australia - Pro	RAM Motorsport	6	1	0	0	3	244	16th
2026	Supercars Championship	Triple Eight Race Engineering	25	0	0	0	0	509*	23rd*

* Season still in progress

=== Complete Australian Formula 4 Championship results ===
(key) (Races in bold indicate pole position) (Races in italics indicate fastest lap)

Year	Team	1	2	3	4	5	6	7	8	9	10	11	12	13	14	15	16	17	18	19	20	21	DC	Points
2018	Patrizicorse	SYM; 1; 7	SYM; 2; 6	SYM; 3; 8	PHI; 1; 7	PHI; 2 Ret	PHI; 3; 4	QLD; 1; 7	QLD; 2; 8	QLD; 3; 5	WIN1; 1; 6	WIN1; 2; 4	WIN1; 3; 9	WIN2; 1; 3	WIN2; 2; 9	WIN2; 3; 10	SYD; 1; 5	SYD; 2; 3	SYD; 3 Ret	PUK; 1; 9	PUK; 2; 5	PUK; 3; 3	6th	148
2019	Patrizicorse	MEL; 1 Ret	MEL; 2; 6	MEL; 3; 10	SYD; 1; 5	SYD; 2; 3	SYD; 3; 5	PHI1; 1; 6	PHI1; 2 Ret	PHI1; 3; 5	PHI2; 1; 6	PHI2; 2; 5	PHI2; 3; 5	BEN1; 1; 7	BEN1; 2; 5	BEN1; 3; 1	BEN2; 1 Ret	BEN2; 2 DNS	BEN2; 3 Ret				5th	125

=== Complete F3 Asian Championship results ===
(key) (Races in bold indicate pole position) (Races in italics indicate fastest lap)

Year	Team	1	2	3	4	5	6	7	8	9	10	11	12	13	14	15	DC	Points
2019	Hitech Grand Prix	SEP; 1	SEP; 2	SEP; 3	CHA; 1	CHA; 2	CHA; 3	SUZ; 1; 7	SUZ; 2; 3	SUZ; 3; 5	SIC1; 1; 6	SIC1; 2; 6	SIC1; 3; 7	SIC2; 1; 4	SIC2; 2; 5	SIC2; 3; 3	6th	90

=== Complete Toyota Racing Series results ===
(key) (Races in bold indicate pole position) (Races in italics indicate fastest lap)

Year	Team	1	2	3	4	5	6	7	8	9	10	11	12	13	14	15	16	17	DC	Points
2019	MTEC Motorsport	HIG; 1	HIG; 2	HIG; 3	TER; 1; 13	TER; 2 C	TER; 3 C	HMP; 1; 8	HMP; 2; 5	HMP; 3 Ret	HMP; 4; 8	TAU; 1; 6	TAU; 2; 13	TAU; 3; 12	TAU; 4; 10	MAN; 1; 10	MAN; 2 Ret	MAN; 3 Ret	12th	110
2020	mtec Motorsport	HIG; 1; 12	HIG; 2; 9	HIG; 3 Ret	TER; 1 Ret	TER; 2; 15	**TER**; **3**; 4	HMP; 1; 8	HMP; 2; 9	HMP; 3; 12	PUK; 1; 6	PUK; 2; 1	PUK; 3; 10	MAN; 1; 10	MAN; 2; 9	MAN; 3; 8			10th	160

=== Super2 Series results ===
(key) (Race results only)

Super2 Series results
Year	Team	No.	Car	1	2	3	4	5	6	7	8	9	10	11	12	Position	Points
2025	Triple Eight Race Engineering	11	Holden ZB Commodore	SYD; R1; 10	SYD; R2; 7	SYM; R3; 10	SYM; R4; 6	TOW; R5; 5	TOW; R6; 8	QLD; R7; 5	**QLD**; **R8**; 1	BAT; R9; 12	BAT; R10; Ret	ADE; R11; DNS	ADE; R12; DNS	12th	885

=== Supercars Championship results ===
Supercars results
Year	Team	No.	Car	1	2	3	4	5	6	7	8	9	10	11	12	13	14	15	16	17	18	19	20	21	22	23	24	25	26	27	28	29	30	31	32	33	34	35	36	37	Position	Points
2026	Triple Eight Race Engineering	11	Ford Mustang S650	SMP; R1; 18	SMP; R2; 19	SMP; R3; 14	MEL; R4; 24	MEL; R5; 16	MEL; R6; 12	MEL; R7; 16	TAU; R8; 22	TAU; R9; Ret	CHR; R10; 21	CHR; R11; 22	CHR; R12; 24	CHR; R13; 22	SYM; R14; 22	SYM; R15; 21	SYM; R16; 18	HID; R20; 22	HID; R21; 20	HID; R22; 23	TOW; R23; 18	TOW; R24; 18	TOW; R25; 16	BAR; R17; 17	BAR; R18; 24	BAR; R19; 20	QLD; R26	QLD; R27	QLD; R28	BEN; R28	BAT; R30	SUR; R31	SUR; R32	SAN; R33	SAN; R34	ADE; R35	ADE; R36	ADE; R37	23rd*	509*
