= Porsche Carrera Cup Australia Championship =

Australian motor racing series open to Porsche 911 GT3 Cup cars

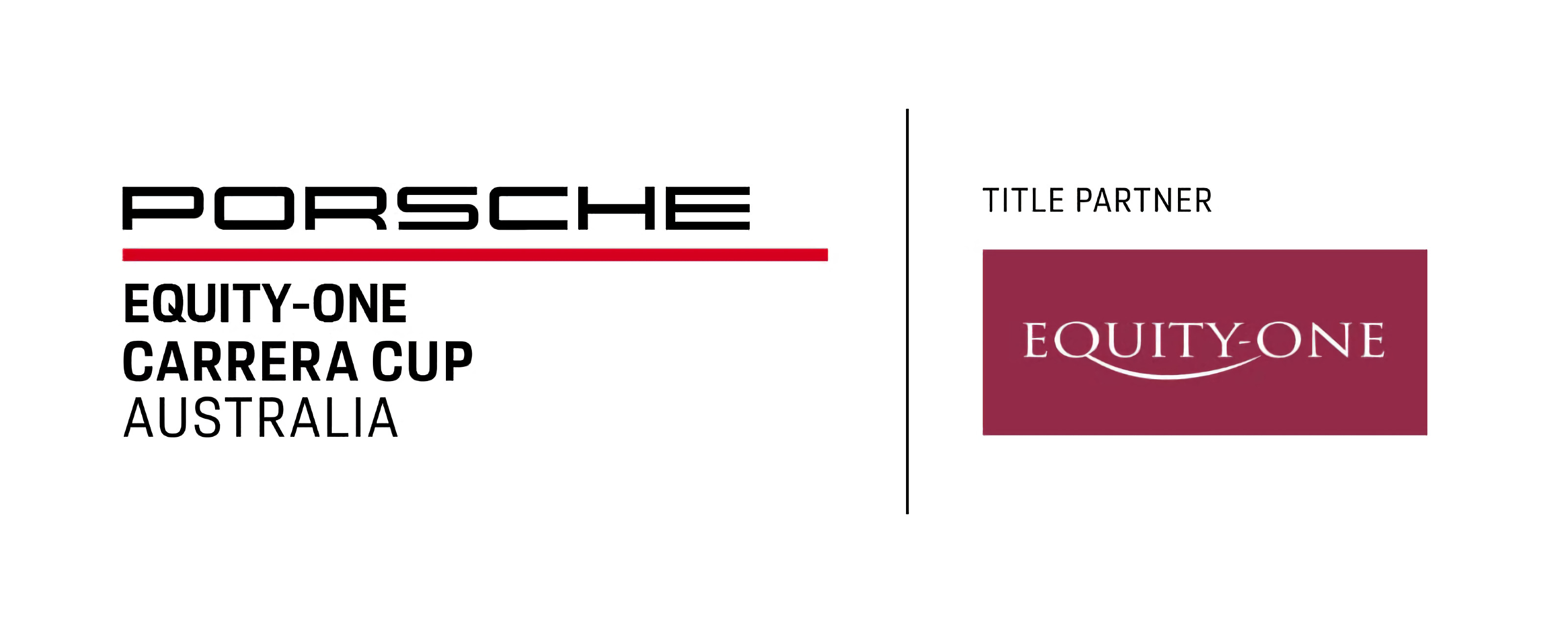
- Category: One-make racing by Porsche
- Country: Australia
- Inaugural season: 2003
- Drivers: 38
- Teams: 14
- Constructors: Porsche
- Tyre suppliers: Michelin
- Drivers' champion: (Australia) Dylan O'Keeffe
- Teams' champion: (Australia) RAM Motorsport
- Official website: Carrera Cup Australia

Porsche Carrera Cup Australia (known commercially currently as the Porsche Equity-One Carrera Cup Australia) is an Australian motor racing series open to Porsche 911 GT3 Cup cars. First held in 2003, it is administered by Porsche Cars Australia Pty Ltd and is sanctioned by Motorsport Australia (Formerly Confederation of Australian Motor Sport (CAMS) as a national championship through to 2015 and as a National Series from 2016-2021. Starting in 2022 the category returned as a national championship. During its history, Carrera Cup has been a leading support category for the Supercars Championship. New Zealand driver Craig Baird has been the most successful driver, winning the series five times.

== History ==
The regulations for the series are based on those used for Porsche Carrera Cup racing series in Europe and elsewhere, with modifications to the cars strictly controlled to ensure parity between competing vehicles. From 2003 to 2005 the specified model was the Porsche 911 GT3 Cup (Type 996) with the Porsche 911 GT3 Cup (Type 997) used from 2006 and various iterations of the car beyond that, usually in a three-year cycle until the end of 2013. Porsche 911 GT3 Cup (Type 991) was first introduced and used in 2014 until the Porsche 911 GT3 Cup Type 991.II iteration arrived in 2018. Starting in the 2022 season the Porsche 911 GT3 Cup Type 992 is set to be introduced.

Jim Richards was the inaugural champion, fresh from having taken Porsche 996s to three consecutive Australian Nations Cup Championships. The series quickly proved its worth as a ladder category for emerging young drivers with Alex Davison and Fabian Coulthard winning championships while Marcus Marshall, Jonathon Webb and David Reynolds were also early graduates. The series was also responsible for the creation of a number of professional motor racing teams, including Paul Cruikshank Racing and VIP Petfoods Racing while also giving teams like Sonic Motor Racing Services, Tekno Autosports and International Motorsport opportunities to expand.

=== Demise ===
In the lead up to the 2009 season the series organisers were forced to cancel the series, citing a lack of competitors. Those competitors left with 997 GT3 Cup Cars found themselves without a series to race in as the cars were neither able to compete in the Australian GT Championship, to which they were eligible but were prevented by CAMS with the intention of preventing the collapse that ultimately occurred or the Porsche GT3 Cup Challenge Australia as models newer than 996s were not eligible for points. As the situation evolved permission was gained for the Porsches to enter the GT series in strictly limited numbers and likewise 997s were allowed to compete in the GT3 Challenge but to compete to their own pointscore rather than take points away from the 996 and 993s that made up the bulk of the series competitors.

=== Revival ===
Porsche Cars Australia announced the series would return for the 2011 season featuring the 2011 specification version of the Type 997 GT3 Cup. Since the series revival Craig Baird, already a two-time champion, dominated again, winning a further three championships. The following seven seasons saw seven new champions, with Baird remaining the only multiple champion as of 2021. Since 2013, an annual two-driver pro-am event has been included in the series, with several guest appearances from Supercars drivers.

In 2015 the Confederation of Australian Motor Sport announced that Carrera Cup would be downgraded from national championship to national series status from 2016.

In 2016 and 2018, a joint round between the series and Porsche Carrera Cup Asia was held at Sydney Motorsport Park. The event featured individual races for each series before two combined races, one for both the Pro and Challenge classes. Both combined races were won by Australian entrants. In 2017, the Australian series travelled to Asia to contest a similar joint round at Sepang International Circuit in Malaysia. The series also introduced an Endurance Cup in 2017, with the first round alongside the Supercars Sandown 500.

In the 2020 season of Porsche Carrera Cup Australia. It would be cancelled after Race 1 of Round 2 during the 2020 Australian Formula 1 Grand Prix weekend in Albert Park Melbourne due to the COVID-19 pandemic. There here by no champion would be crowned for the season.

In the 2022 season. Motorsport Australia (Formerly Confederation of Australian Motor Sport (CAMS)) has announced that Porsche Carrera Cup Australia would regain its status as a national championship.

== Circuits ==
- (Victoria (state)) Phillip Island Grand Prix Circuit (2003, 2005–2006, 2008, 2011–2012, 2014–2015, 2017–2019)
- (New South Wales) Sydney Motorsport Park (Note: Sydney Motorsport Park held two rounds in 2003.) (2003–2005, 2013–2016, 2018, 2024–2025)
- (Victoria (state)) Winton Motor Raceway (2003–2004, 2007, 2013, 2022)
- (Northern Territory) Hidden Valley Raceway (2003–2004, 2006–2007, 2017–2019, 2022–present)
- Queensland Raceway (2003–2005, 2007–2008, 2025–present)
- (Victoria (state)) Sandown Raceway (2003–2008, 2014–2017, 2020–2024)
- (New South Wales) Mount Panorama Motor Racing Circuit (2003–2008, 2011–2019, 2021–present)
- (Queensland) Surfers Paradise Street Circuit (2003–2008, 2011–2019, 2022–present)
- (South Australia) Adelaide Street Circuit (2004–2008, 2012–2020, 2023–present)
- (Western Australia) Wanneroo Raceway (2004–2005, 2008, 2011–2012)
- (New South Wales) Oran Park Raceway (2005–2007)
- (New South Wales) One Raceway (2006, 2008)
- (Victoria (state)) Albert Park Circuit (Note: Albert Park Circuit held a non-championship round in 2007.) (2007–2008, 2011–2020, 2022–present)
- (Queensland) Reid Park Street Circuit (2011–2015, 2019, 2021–2023)
- (New South Wales) Homebush Street Circuit (2011–2012)
- (Malaysia) Petronas Sepang International Circuit (2017)
- (South Australia) The Bend Motorsport Park (2018–2019, 2021–2023, 2025–present)
- (New Zealand) Taupo International Motorsport Park (2024)

== Champions ==
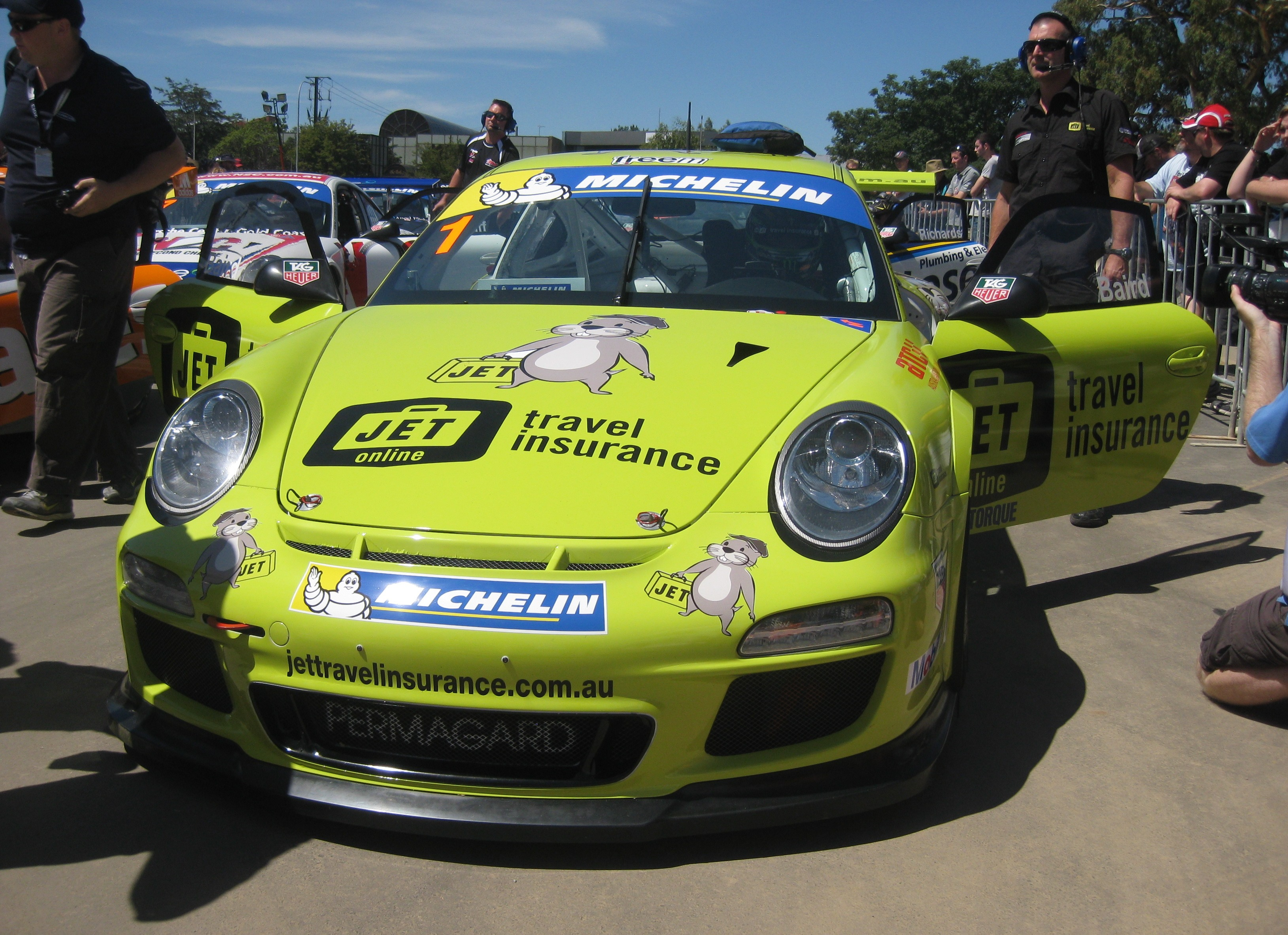
Craig Baird (pictured in 2013) has won the championship five times

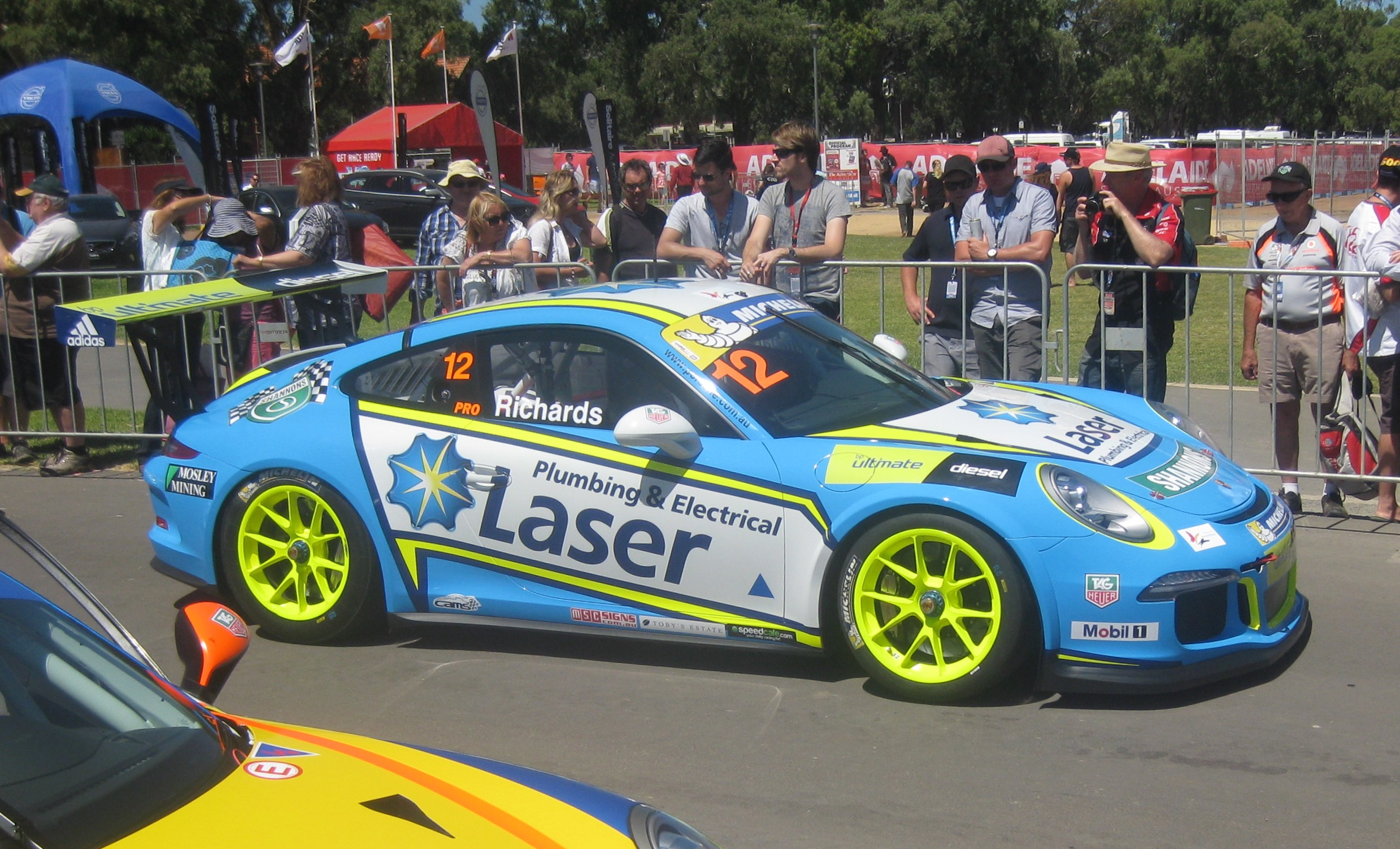
Steven Richards won the 2014 Championship

Season	Champion	Car
Australian Carrera Cup Championship
2003	(New Zealand) Jim Richards	Porsche 911 GT3 Cup Type 996
2004	(Australia) Alex Davison	Porsche 911 GT3 Cup Type 996
2005	(New Zealand) Fabian Coulthard	Porsche 911 GT3 Cup Type 996
2006	(New Zealand) Craig Baird	Porsche 911 GT3 Cup Type 997
2007	(Australia) David Reynolds	Porsche 911 GT3 Cup Type 997
2008	(New Zealand) Craig Baird	Porsche 911 GT3 Cup Type 997
2009–2010	not held	
2011	(New Zealand) Craig Baird	Porsche 911 GT3 Cup Type 997.II
2012	(New Zealand) Craig Baird	Porsche 911 GT3 Cup Type 997.II
2013	(New Zealand) Craig Baird	Porsche 911 GT3 Cup Type 997.II
2014	(New Zealand) Steven Richards	Porsche 911 GT3 Cup Type 991
2015	(Australia) Nick Foster	Porsche 911 GT3 Cup Type 991
Porsche Carrera Cup Australia
2016	(Australia) Matt Campbell	Porsche 911 GT3 Cup Type 991
2017	(Australia) David Wall	Porsche 911 GT3 Cup Type 991
2018	(New Zealand) Jaxon Evans	Porsche 911 GT3 Cup Type 991.II
2019	(Australia) Jordan Love	Porsche 911 GT3 Cup Type 991.II
2020	no champion awarded	
2021	(Australia) Cameron Hill	Porsche 911 GT3 Cup Type 991.II
Porsche Carrera Cup Australia Championship
2022	(Australia) Harri Jones	Porsche 911 GT3 Cup Type 992
2023	(New Zealand) Callum Hedge	Porsche 911 GT3 Cup Type 992
2024	(Australia) Harri Jones	Porsche 911 GT3 Cup Type 992
2025	(Australia) Dylan O'Keeffe	Porsche 911 GT3 Cup Type 992

== Multiple champions ==
Wins	Driver	Years
5	(New Zealand) Craig Baird	2006, 2008, 2011–2013
2	(Australia) Harri Jones	2022, 2024

== Top 10 Race Winners ==
Position	Wins	Driver
1	60	(New Zealand) Craig Baird
2	49	(Australia) Alex Davison
3	31	(New Zealand) Jim Richards
4	22	(Australia) Harri Jones
5	21	(Australia) Dale Wood
6	20	(New Zealand) Fabian Coulthard
=	20	(Australia) Matt Campbell
8	16	(Australia) David Wall
9	13	(Australia) David Reynolds
=	13	(Australia) Jordan Love
=	13	(New Zealand) Steven Richards
=	13	(Australia) Aaron Love
10	12	(New Zealand) Jonny Reid
