= Christchurch Super 440 =

Motor racing event in New Zealand

(New Zealand) Christchurch Super 440
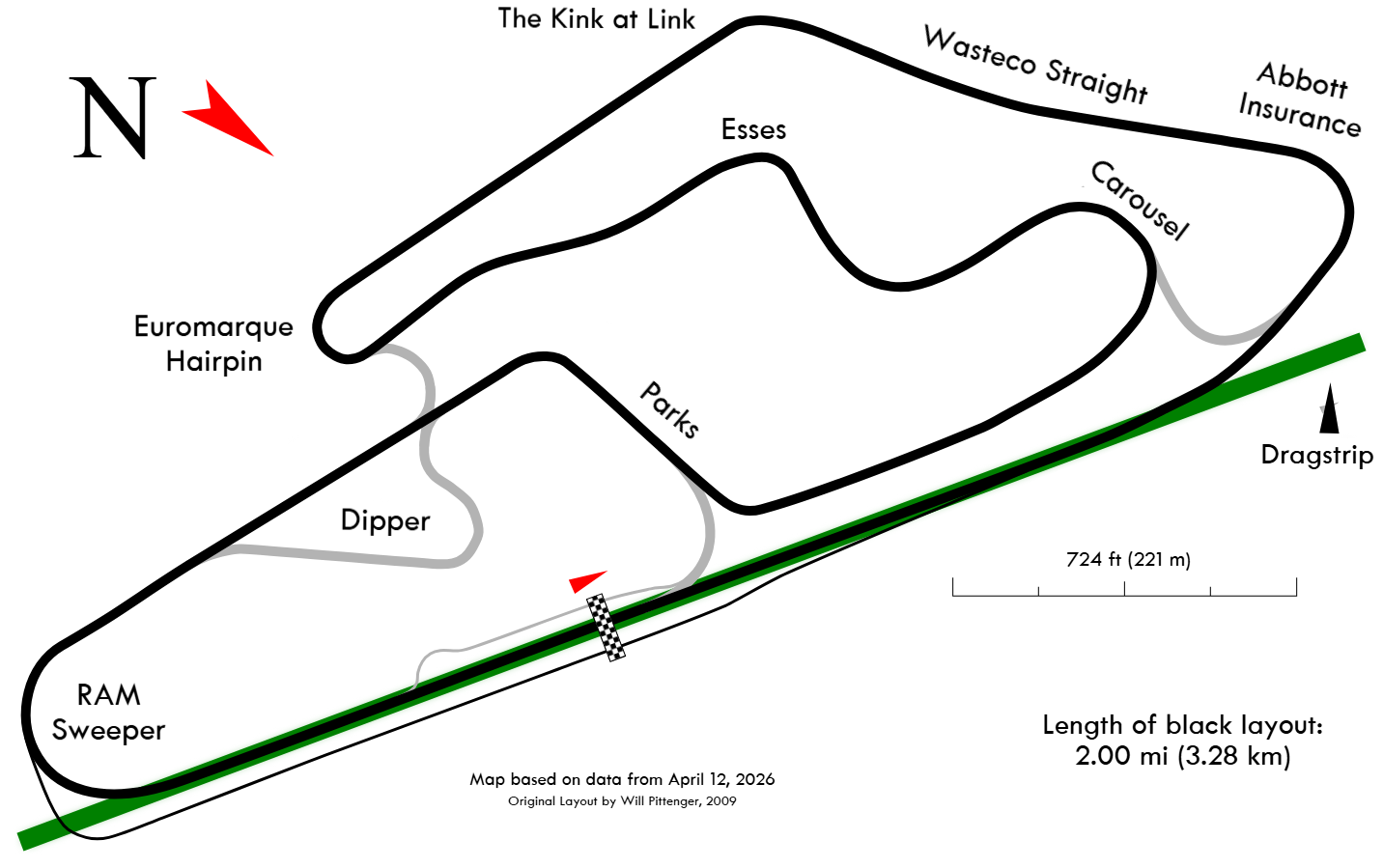
- Race Information
| Venue | Euromarque Motorsport Park |
| Number of times held | 1 |
| First held | 2026 |
- Race Format
- Race 1
| Laps | 37 |
| Distance | 100 km |
- Race 2
| Laps | 37 |
| Distance | 100 km |
- Race 3
| Laps | 37 |
| Distance | 100 km |
- Race 4
| Laps | 61 |
| Distance | 200 km |
- Last Event (2026)
- Overall Winner
| (Australia) Kai Allen | Grove Racing |
- Race Winners
| (Australia) Kai Allen | Grove Racing |
| (Australia) Brodie Kostecki | Dick Johnson Racing |
| (New Zealand) Matt Payne | Grove Racing |
| (New Zealand) Matt Payne | Grove Racing |

The Christchurch Super 440 (known for sponsorship reasons as the ITM Christchurch Super 440) is the current name for the annual motor racing event for the Supercars Championship, held at Euromarque Motorsport Park in Christchurch, New Zealand since 2026.

== Format ==
The current format consists of three days, from Friday to Sunday, with three races total. Friday consists of two practice sessions. On Saturday two two-part knockout qualifying sessions are used to determine the starting grids for the first two races, both 100km in length, taking place later in the day. On Sunday, a third two-part knockout qualifying determines the top 10 cars, who then go on to compete in a Top Ten Shootout to determine the final ten places. The final 200km race then takes place on Sunday afternoon.

In 2026, an alternative format of four races was used, following the cancellation of the Sunday programme at the previous week's 2026 Taupō Super 440 due to Cyclone Vaianu (2026). This consisted of an additional qualifying session and 100km race held on Friday. Only one practice session was held.

== History ==
The Australian-based Supercars have held championship rounds in New Zealand since 2001, first at Pukekohe Park Raceway. In May 2025, Supercars announced that, for the first time, a second annual New Zealand event would be added to from 2026, joining the Taupō Supercars round at Taupo International Motorsport Park in consecutive weekends. The initial deal, also the first event to be held on New Zealand's South Island, was for three years and included various upgrades to the circuit. The Jason Richards Trophy, which was previously awarded to the event winner at the single New Zealand events in Pukekohe and Taupō from 2013 onwards, would now be awarded to the highest scorer over the New Zealand double header.

The inaugural weekend in 2026 saw a total attendance of 65,806, selling out on both Saturday and Sunday, making it the biggest event ever held at Euromarque Motorsport Park. A new pit complex is planned to be built in time for the 2027 incarnation of the event. This follows spacing and safety issues with the existing pit complex, which necessitated an alternate arrangement of team's equipment, and rule changes that disallowed double-stacking. Grove Racing won three of the four races over the expanded first weekend (due to the cancellation of the final race of the previous Taupō event), including Kai Allen's first championship race win. Ryan Wood was on track to win the Jason Richards Trophy, however broke down towards the end of the race, resulting in Broc Feeney winning the trophy despite no wins at either event.

== Winners ==
| Year | Driver | Team | Car | Report |
|---|---|---|---|---|
| 2026 | (Australia) Kai Allen | Grove Racing | Ford Mustang S650 | Report |

== Event names and sponsors ==
- 2026: ITM Christchurch Super 440

== See also ==
- List of Australian Touring Car Championship races
