= New Zealand Formula Ford Championship =

Motorsport series

- Category: Open-wheeler
- Country: New Zealand
- Inaugural season: 1971
- Drivers' champion: (New Zealand) Marco Manson
- Official website: https://formulaford.co.nz/

The New Zealand Formula Ford Championship (known for commercial reasons as the NAPA Auto Parts New Zealand Formula Ford Championship) has been held annually in New Zealand racing circuits.

== History ==
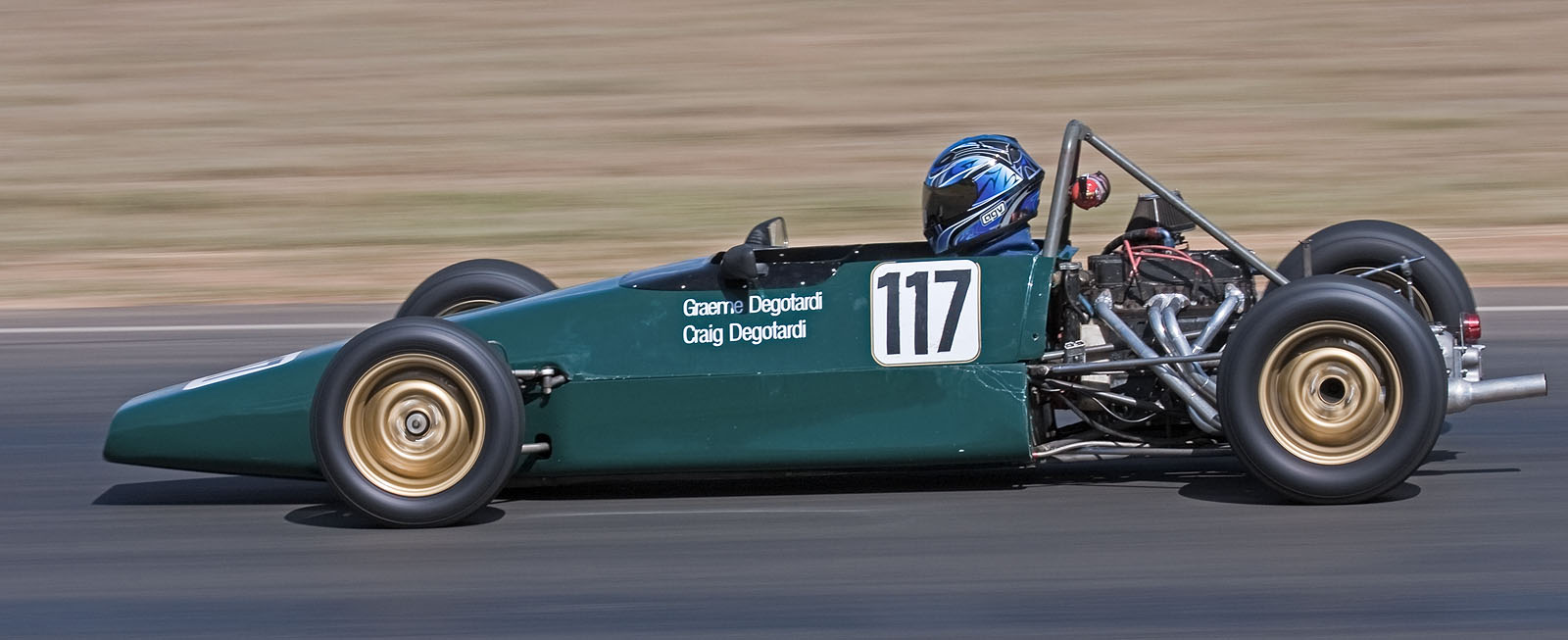
Elfin 600

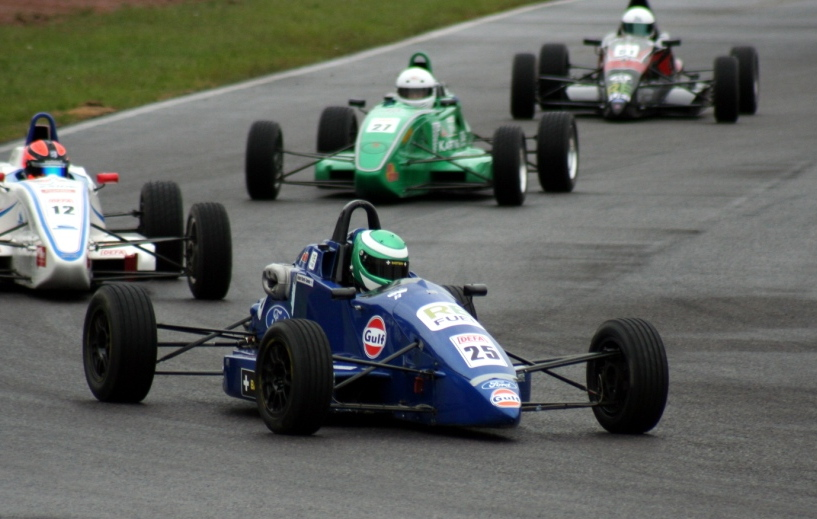
Mygale SJ06 followed by a Van Diemen RF03

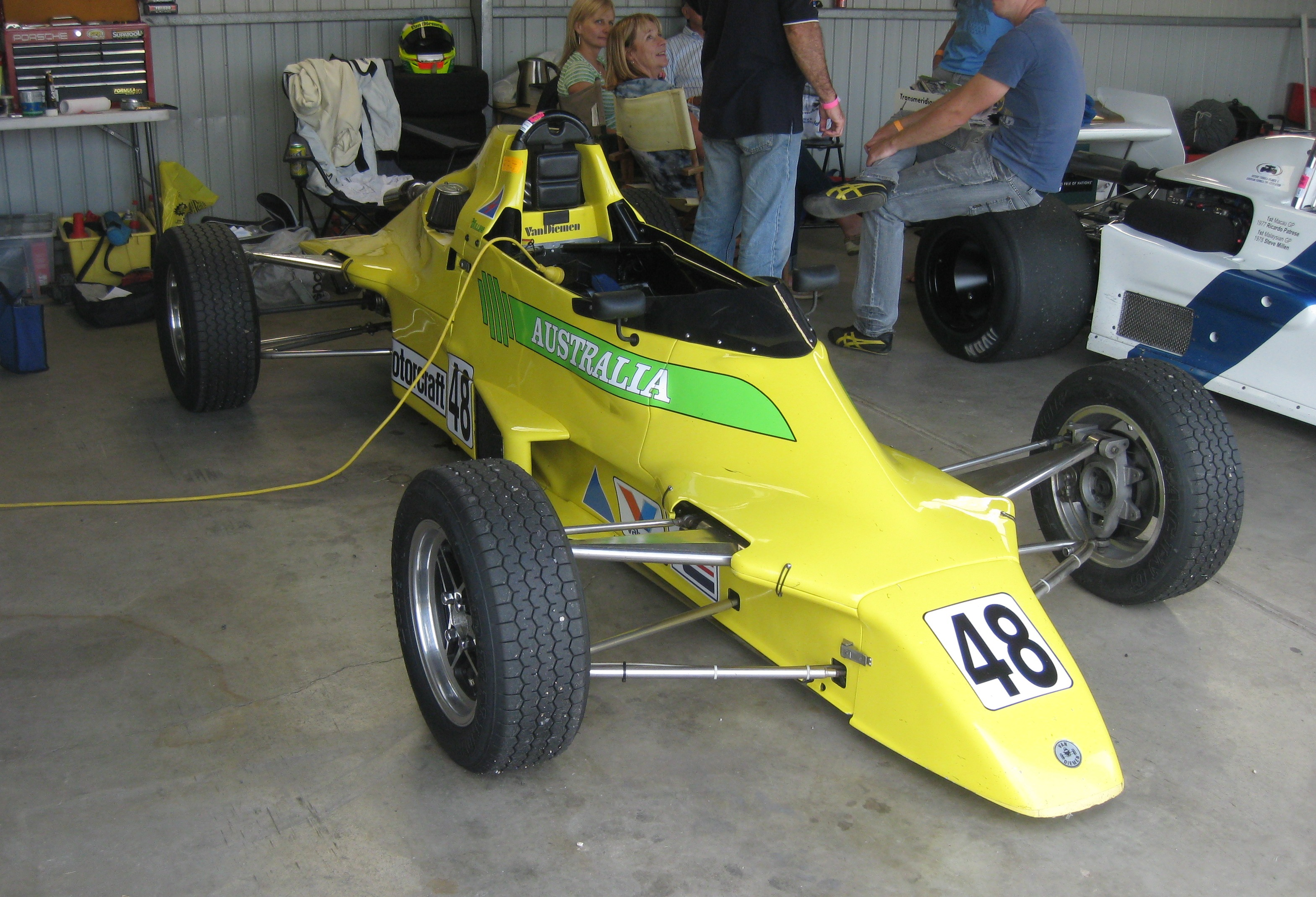
Van Diemen RF86

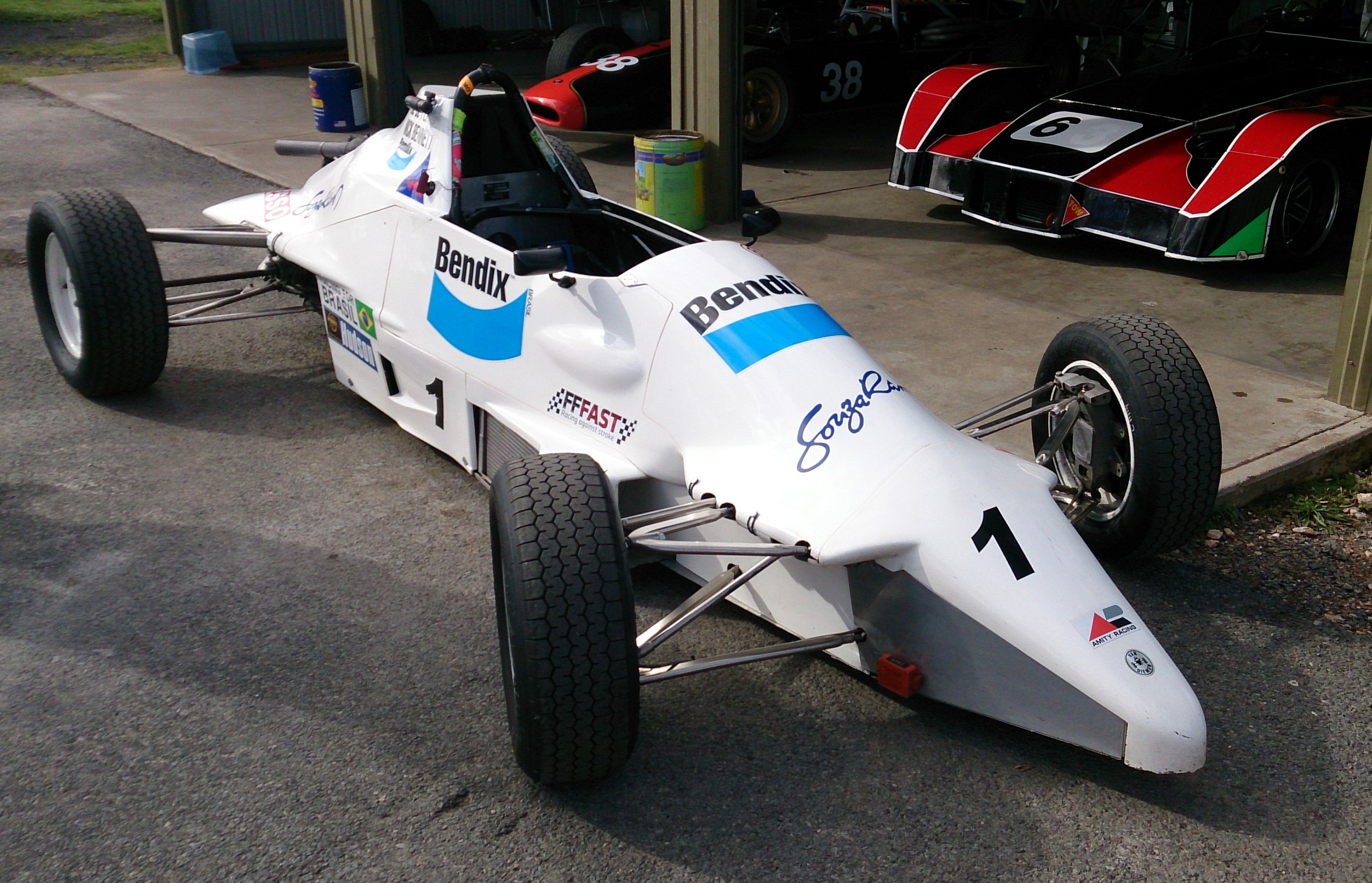
Van Diemen RF88

Formula Ford emerged as a racing class in New Zealand. In 1972, the inaugural New Zealand Formula Ford championship won by David Oxton. The open wheel category rapidly developed into the series for emerging young New Zealand race drivers. Graduates include Brendon Hartley, Liam Lawson, Scott Dixon, Shane van Gisbergen, David Oxton, Dave McMillan, Fabian Coulthard and Jonny Reid.

Year	Driver	Car
1971–72	(New Zealand) David Oxton	Elfin 600
1972–73	(New Zealand) Dave McMillan	Opert Titan Mk6
1973–74	(New Zealand) Peter Hughes	Bowin P6
1974–75	(New Zealand) Grant Walker	Elfin Superford
1975–76	(New Zealand) Dave McMillan	Lola T342
1976–77	(New Zealand) Eric Morgan	Lola T342
1977–78	(New Zealand) Grant Campbell	Titan Mk9c
1978–79	(New Zealand) Mike Finch	Cuda II
1979–80	(New Zealand) Mike King	Titan Mk9C
1980–81	(New Zealand) Jeff Pascoe	Swift LM1
1981–82	(New Zealand) Mike King	Crossle 25F
1982–83	(New Zealand) Kevin Ingram	Keram
1983–84	(New Zealand) Steven Richards	Titan Mk6
1984–85	(New Zealand) John Crawford	Reynard FF84
1985–86	(New Zealand) Craig Coleman	Van Diemen RF85
1986–87	(New Zealand) Shane Higgins	Van Diemen RF86
1987–88	(New Zealand) Craig Baird	Van Diemen RF86
1988–89	(New Zealand) Grant Campbell	Swift FB4
1989–90	(New Zealand) Paul Larsen	Swift FB89
1990–91	(New Zealand) Andy McElrea	Van Diemen RF88
1991–92	(New Zealand) Gary Croft	
1992–93	(New Zealand) Ashley Stichbury	Van Diemen RF84?
1993–94	(New Zealand) Ashley Stichbury	Van Diemen RF84?
1994–95	(New Zealand) Shane Drake	
1995–96	(New Zealand) Greg Tullett	Van Diemen
1996–97	(New Zealand) Scott Dixon	Swift
1997–98	(New Zealand) Greg Tullett	Van Diemen
1998–99	(New Zealand) LeRoy Stevenson	Van Diemen
1999–00	(New Zealand) Phil Hellebrekers	Spectrum 07
2000–01	(New Zealand) James Cressey	Van Diemen RF94
2001–02	(New Zealand) Fabian Coulthard	Stealth Van Diemen RF94
2002–03	(New Zealand) Jonny Reid	Stealth Van Diemen RF94
2003–04	(New Zealand) Tim Edgell	Van Diemen RF03
2004–05	(Australia) Shannon O'Brien	Van Diemen RF03
2005–06	(New Zealand) Shane van Gisbergen	Stealth Evo 2
2006–07	(New Zealand) Sam MacNeill	Van Diemen
2007–08	(New Zealand) John Whelan	Stealth Van Diemen
2008–09	(New Zealand) Richie Stanaway	Mygale SJ08A
2009–10	(New Zealand) Martin Short	Mygale SJ07A
2010–11	(New Zealand) Andre Heimgartner	Mygale SJ10
2011–12	(New Zealand) Andre Heimgartner	Mygale SJ10
2012–13	(New Zealand) James Munro	Mygale SJ08A
2013–14	(New Zealand) Jamie Conroy	Mygale SJ07A
2014–15	(New Zealand) Taylor Cockerton	Mygale SJ08A
2015–16	(New Zealand) Michael Scott	Mygale SJ08A
2016–17	(New Zealand) Liam Lawson	Mygale SJ08A
2017–18	(New Zealand) Callum Hedge	Mygale SJ08A
2018–19	(New Zealand) Jordan Michels	Mygale SJ13
2019–20	(New Zealand) Billy Frazer	Spectrum 015
2020–21	(New Zealand) James Penrose	Van Diemen Stealth
2021–22	(New Zealand) Alex Crosbie	Ray GR21
2022–23	(New Zealand) Alex Crosbie	Ray GR21
2023–24	(New Zealand) Blake Knowles	Van Diemen RF05
2025	(New Zealand) Blake Dowdall	Spectrum 015
2026	(New Zealand) Marco Manson	Spectrum 015
