= 2026 Taupō Super 440 =

Motor racing event in Taupo, New Zealand

(New Zealand) 2026 Taupō Super 440
Event Information
- Round 3 of 14 in the 2026 Supercars Championship
- Layout of the Taupo International Motorsport Park
- Date: 10–12 April 2026
- Location: Taupō, New Zealand
- Venue: Taupo International Motorsport Park

Results
Race 1
Distance	37 laps	120 km
Pole position	(Australia) Brodie Kostecki; Dick Johnson Racing	
Winner	(Australia) Brodie Kostecki; Dick Johnson Racing	
Race 2
Distance	60 laps	200 km
Pole position	(New Zealand) Ryan Wood; Walkinshaw TWG Racing	
Winner	(New Zealand) Ryan Wood; Walkinshaw TWG Racing	
Round Results
First	(New Zealand) Ryan Wood; Walkinshaw TWG Racing	213 pts
Second	(Australia) Broc Feeney; Triple Eight Race Engineering	196 pts
Third	(Australia) Will Brown; Triple Eight Race Engineering	183 pts

The 2026 Taupō Super 440 (known for commercial reasons as the 2026 ITM Taupō Super 440) was a motor racing event for Supercars that was held on 10–12 April 2026 at the Taupo International Motorsport Park in the Taupō, New Zealand. The round consisted of one 120km race as well as a 200km feature, and was the third round of the 2026 Supercars Championship.

The first race was won by Brodie Kostecki in a light-to-flag victory whilst the second race was won by local driver, Ryan Wood. Wood's victory marked the first win for Toyota in the Supercars category.

The event would be disrupted by Cyclone Vaianu. After adjusting the schedule in anticipation of the looming storm, Sunday's track activity would be cancelled and the scheduled third race would be shifted to run as part of the Christchurch Super 440 programme.

== Background ==
The event was held on the weekend of 10–12 April 2026. It was the third Supercars event to be held at the Taupo International Motorsport Park, and the first international event of the season, with the other being the Christchurch Super 440 being held one week later.

The event schedule would be altered in response to the looming threat of Cyclone Vaianu that hit the North Island on Saturday evening. The 200 km race would be shifted to Saturday evening, replacing the 120 km race initially in that time slot. That 120 km race would then be shifted to Sunday morning with the racing programme concluding before midday. The top-ten shootout scheduled for Sunday was scrapped altogether in lieu of a conventional qualifying format. However, after the storm situation was reassessed, Sunday's track activity would be cancelled and the third race would be shifted to run as part of the Christchurch Super 440 programme.

Drivers would also compete for the Jason Richards Memorial Trophy; an accolade awarded to the driver who accumulates the highest total points tally over the course of the two New Zealand rounds.

=== Entry list ===
Twenty four cars were entered into the event — 8 sixth-generation Chevrolet Camaros, 11 seventh-generation Ford Mustangs and 5 Toyota Supras. This event served as the home race for three drivers - Matt Payne, Ryan Wood and Andre Heimgartner.

Multiple teams and drivers sported special liveries unique to the New Zealand rounds. This included Thomas Randle at Tickford Racing who sported a predominantly silver and black livery with silver fern iconography, and Cameron Hill would sport a Team Kiwi Racing-inspired livery on his Brad Jones Racing Supra in commemoration of the teams legacy driver and round trophy namesake, Jason Richards.

During the weekend, it was announced that Walkinshaw TWG Racing drivers, Chaz Mostert and Ryan Wood, had signed long-term contract extensions with the team.

== Results ==
=== Race 1 ===
Pos.	No.	Driver	Team	Car	Laps	Time/Retired	Grid	Pts
1	17	(Australia) Brodie Kostecki	Dick Johnson Racing	Ford Mustang S650	37	56:28.991	1	80
2	888	(Australia) Will Brown	Triple Eight Race Engineering	Ford Mustang S650	37	+ 16.186	4	74
3	2	(New Zealand) Ryan Wood	Walkinshaw TWG Racing	Toyota GR Supra	37	+ 16.532	5	68
4	88	(Australia) Broc Feeney	Triple Eight Race Engineering	Ford Mustang S650	37	+ 23.446	2	62
5	19	(New Zealand) Matt Payne	Grove Racing	Ford Mustang S650	37	+ 24.844	3	57
6	7	(Australia) James Golding	Blanchard Racing Team	Ford Mustang S650	37	+ 26.108	10	53
7	1	(Australia) Chaz Mostert	Walkinshaw TWG Racing	Toyota GR Supra	37	+ 28.309	7	49
8	18	(Australia) Anton de Pasquale	Team 18	Chevrolet Camaro ZL1	37	+ 31.300	15	45
9	4	(Australia) Jack Le Brocq	Matt Stone Racing	Chevrolet Camaro ZL1	37	+ 37.308	11	41
10	20	(Australia) David Reynolds	Team 18	Chevrolet Camaro ZL1	37	+ 43.753	16	38
11	14	(Australia) Cameron Hill	Brad Jones Racing	Toyota GR Supra	37	+ 46.020	17	35
12	8	(New Zealand) Andre Heimgartner	Brad Jones Racing	Toyota GR Supra	37	+ 46.790	9	32
13	99	(Australia) Cooper Murray	Erebus Motorsport	Chevrolet Camaro ZL1	37	+ 57.965	19	29
14	777	(Australia) Declan Fraser	PremiAir Racing	Chevrolet Camaro ZL1	37	+ 1:02.333	20	27
15	38	(Australia) Rylan Gray	Dick Johnson Racing	Ford Mustang S650	37	+ 1:04.417	24	25
16	96	(Australia) Macauley Jones	Brad Jones Racing	Toyota GR Supra	37	+ 1:06.329	22	23
17	10	(Australia) Zach Bates	Matt Stone Racing	Chevrolet Camaro ZL1	37	+ 1:07.484	23	21
18	31	(Australia) Jayden Ojeda	PremiAir Racing	Chevrolet Camaro ZL1	37	+ 1:09.826	18	19
19	55	(Australia) Thomas Randle	Tickford Racing	Ford Mustang S650	37	+ 1:20.802	8	18
20	3	(Australia) Aaron Cameron	Blanchard Racing Team	Ford Mustang S650	37	+ 1:30.258	12	16
21	6	(Australia) Cam Waters	Tickford Racing	Ford Mustang S650	37	1:45.945	13	15
22	11	(Australia) Jackson Walls	Triple Eight Race Engineering	Ford Mustang S650	36	+ 1 lap	14	14
23	26	(Australia) Kai Allen	Grove Racing	Ford Mustang S650	32	+ 5 laps	6	13
Ret	9	(Australia) Jobe Stewart	Erebus Motorsport	Chevrolet Camaro ZL1	2	Accident damage	21	
Fastest Lap: Ryan Wood (Walkinshaw TWG Racing) - 1:29.1974 on lap 24

=== Race 2 ===
Pos.	No.	Driver	Team	Car	Laps	Time/Retired	Grid	Pts
1	2	(New Zealand) Ryan Wood	Walkinshaw TWG Racing	Toyota GR Supra	60	1:30.28.703	1	140
2	88	(Australia) Broc Feeney	Triple Eight Race Engineering	Ford Mustang S650	60	+ 3.036	3	129
3	1	(Australia) Chaz Mostert	Walkinshaw TWG Racing	Toyota GR Supra	60	+ 5.512	6	118
4	888	(Australia) Will Brown	Triple Eight Race Engineering	Ford Mustang S650	60	+ 7.005	2	109
5	19	(New Zealand) Matt Payne	Grove Racing	Ford Mustang S650	60	+ 8.820	8	100
6	17	(Australia) Brodie Kostecki	Dick Johnson Racing	Ford Mustang S650	60	+ 12.054	4	92
7	7	(Australia) James Golding	Blanchard Racing Team	Ford Mustang S650	60	+ 16.776	5	85
8	26	(Australia) Kai Allen	Grove Racing	Ford Mustang S650	60	+ 17.004	9	78
9	18	(Australia) Anton de Pasquale	Team 18	Chevrolet Camaro ZL1	60	+ 37.027	7	72
10	6	(Australia) Cam Waters	Tickford Racing	Ford Mustang S650	60	+37.712	10	66
11	4	(Australia) Jack Le Brocq	Matt Stone Racing	Chevrolet Camaro ZL1	60	+ 38.306	11	61
12	8	(New Zealand) Andre Heimgartner	Brad Jones Racing	Toyota GR Supra	60	+ 48.033	16	56
13	55	(Australia) Thomas Randle	Tickford Racing	Ford Mustang S650	60	+ 51.532	12	51
14	31	(Australia) Jayden Ojeda	PremiAir Racing	Chevrolet Camaro ZL1	60	+ 52.033	15	47
15	3	(Australia) Aaron Cameron	Blanchard Racing Team	Ford Mustang S650	60	+ 52.463	14	(Note: Aaron Cameron was stripped of his Race 9 points but kept his 15th-place finish due to a technical infringement.)
16	14	(Australia) Cameron Hill	Brad Jones Racing	Toyota GR Supra	60	+ 55.027	19	40
17	10	(Australia) Zach Bates	Matt Stone Racing	Chevrolet Camaro ZL1	60	+ 57.893	18	37
18	96	(Australia) Macauley Jones	Brad Jones Racing	Toyota GR Supra	60	+ 59.577	23	34
19	20	(Australia) David Reynolds	Team 18	Chevrolet Camaro ZL1	60	+ 1:02.983	13	31
20	99	(Australia) Cooper Murray	Erebus Motorsport	Chevrolet Camaro ZL1	60	+ 1:03.812	20	29
21	38	(Australia) Rylan Gray	Dick Johnson Racing	Ford Mustang S650	60	+ 1:07.125	22	26
22	9	(Australia) Jobe Stewart	Erebus Motorsport	Chevrolet Camaro ZL1	60	+ 1:28.180	17	24
23	777	(Australia) Declan Fraser	PremiAir Racing	Chevrolet Camaro ZL1	59	+ 1 lap	21	22
Ret	11	(Australia) Jackson Walls	Triple Eight Race Engineering	Ford Mustang S650	50	Suspension	24	
Fastest Lap: Broc Feeney (Triple Eight Race Engineering) - 1:27.3233 on lap 48
