= 2026 Christchurch Super 440 =

Motor racing event in Christchurch, New Zealand

(New Zealand) 2026 Christchurch Super 440
Event Information
- Round 4 of 14 in the 2026 Supercars Championship
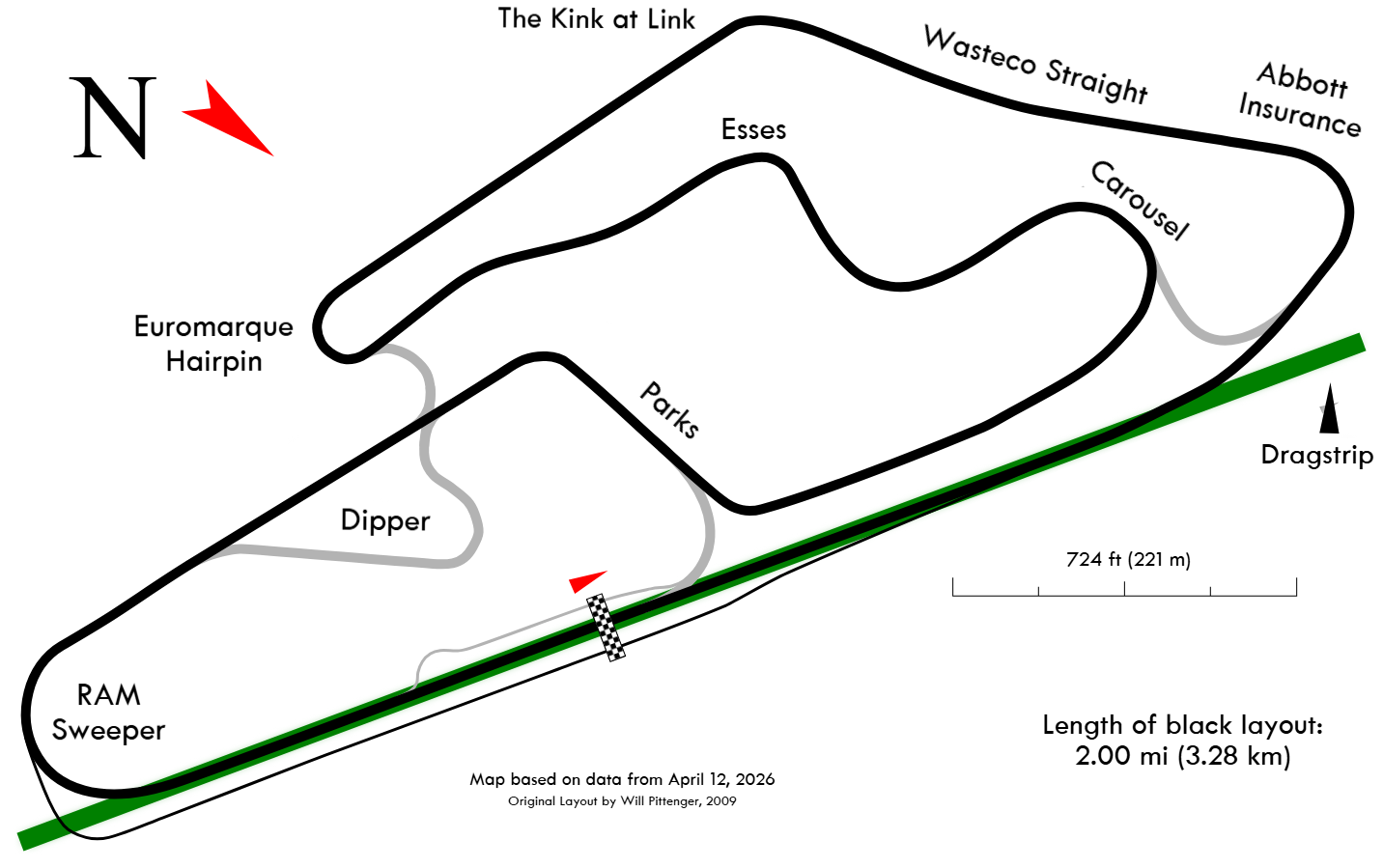
- Layout of the Euromarque Motorsport Park
- Date: 17–19 April 2026
- Location: Christchurch, New Zealand
- Venue: Euromarque Motorsport Park

Results
Race 1
Distance	37 laps	120 km
Pole position	(New Zealand) Matt Payne; Grove Racing	
Winner	(Australia) Kai Allen; Grove Racing	
Race 2
Distance	37 laps	120 km
Pole position	(Australia) Brodie Kostecki; Dick Johnson Racing	
Winner	(Australia) Brodie Kostecki; Dick Johnson Racing	
Race 3
Distance	37 laps	120 km
Pole position	(New Zealand) Ryan Wood; Walkinshaw TWG Racing	
Winner	(New Zealand) Matt Payne; Grove Racing	
Race 4
Distance	60 laps	120 km
Pole position	(New Zealand) Matt Payne; Grove Racing	
Winner	(New Zealand) Matt Payne; Grove Racing	
Round Results
First	(Australia) Kai Allen; Grove Racing	332 pts
Second	(New Zealand) Matt Payne; Grove Racing	310 pts
Third	(Australia) Broc Feeney; Triple Eight Race Engineering	287 pts

The 2026 Christchurch Super 440 (known for commercial reasons as the 2026 ITM Christchurch Super 440) was a motor racing event for Supercars that was held between 17 and 19 April 2026 at the Euromarque Motorsport Park in the Christchurch, New Zealand. The round consisted of three 120 km races as well as a 200 km feature, and will be the fourth round of the 2026 Supercars Championship. This event marked the first time the Supercars Championship had hosted a round in the South Island of New Zealand and the first double-header to be held in the country.

Kai Allen would capture his first Supercars victory in the opening race of the weekend. Brodie Kostecki would win the second race while Matt Payne secured victory in the third and final races. Broc Feeney would secure the Jason Richards Memorial Trophy by virtue of accumulating the most points over the two New Zealand rounds.

After the previous round in Taupō was disrupted by Cyclone Vaianu, the cancelled 120 km race from that weekend would be transferred to the Friday of Christchurch's racing programme.

== Background ==
The event was held on the weekend of 17–19 April 2026. It was the fourth Supercars event to be held at the Euromarque Motorsport Park, and the second international event of the season, with the other being the Taupō Super 440 being held one week later.

Since 2001, the Australian-based Supercars Championship has held rounds in New Zealand. Until 2026 however, no round had ever taken place outside of the North Island. Beginning 2025, rumours abound of a second round to be held in the South Island as part of a championship double-header. The two heavily favoured candidates for the round were Euromarque Motorsport Park (also known as Ruapuna) in Christchurch and Highlands Motorsport Park in Cromwell. In May 2025, a three-year deal was confirmed for Ruapuna to host a second annual New Zealand event starting from the 2026 season, and to be run on the weekend after the Taupō event. In anticipation of this event, various key upgrades will be made to the circuit over the first couple of years.

Drivers would also compete for the Jason Richards Memorial Trophy; an accolade awarded to the driver who accumulates the highest total points tally over the course of the two New Zealand rounds. Heading into the weekend, Ryan Wood led the points tally by virtue of his strong showing in Taupō.

=== Entry list ===
Twenty four cars were entered into the event — 8 sixth-generation Chevrolet Camaros, 11 seventh-generation Ford Mustangs and 5 Toyota Supras. This event served as the home race for three drivers - Matt Payne, Ryan Wood and Andre Heimgartner.

Multiple teams and drivers sported special liveries unique to the New Zealand rounds. This included Thomas Randle at Tickford Racing who sported a predominantly silver and black livery with silver fern iconography, and Cameron Hill would sport a Team Kiwi Racing-inspired livery on his Brad Jones Racing Supra in commemoration of the teams legacy driver and round trophy namesake, Jason Richards.

This round marked the 500th race start for series veteran, David Reynolds. To commemorate this feat, his Camaro would be entered under the number 500 for the first race of the weekend.

== Results ==
=== Race 1 ===
Pos.	No.	Driver	Team	Car	Laps	Time/Retired	Grid	Pts
1	26	(Australia) Kai Allen	Grove Racing	Ford Mustang S650	37	52:16.6608	4	80
2	17	(Australia) Brodie Kostecki	Dick Johnson Racing	Ford Mustang S650	37	+ 0.742	2	74
3	2	(New Zealand) Ryan Wood	Walkinshaw TWG Racing	Toyota GR Supra	37	+ 1.186	3	73
4	19	(New Zealand) Matt Payne	Grove Racing	Ford Mustang S650	37	+ 3.045	1	62
5	18	(Australia) Anton De Pasquale	Team 18	Chevrolet Camaro ZL1	37	+ 20.267	6	57
6	7	(Australia) James Golding	Blanchard Racing Team	Ford Mustang S650	37	+ 25.860	8	53
7	6	(Australia) Cam Waters	Tickford Racing	Ford Mustang S650	37	+ 26.400	14	49
8	1	(Australia) Chaz Mostert	Walkinshaw TWG Racing	Toyota GR Supra	37	+ 26.608	10	45
9	10	(Australia) Zach Bates	Matt Stone Racing	Chevrolet Camaro ZL1	37	+ 33.274	7	41
10	88	(Australia) Broc Feeney	Triple Eight Race Engineering	Ford Mustang S650	37	+ 38.985	9	38
11	55	(Australia) Thomas Randle	Tickford Racing	Ford Mustang S650	37	+ 40.111	11	35
12	31	(Australia) Jayden Ojeda	PremiAir Racing	Chevrolet Camaro ZL1	37	+ 40.400	21	32
13	8	(New Zealand) Andre Heimgartner	Brad Jones Racing	Toyota GR Supra	37	+ 41.135	13	29
14	38	(Australia) Rylan Gray	Dick Johnson Racing	Ford Mustang S650	37	+ 44.057	16	27
15	4	(Australia) Jack Le Brocq	Matt Stone Racing	Chevrolet Camaro ZL1	37	+ 49.204	15	25
16	9	(Australia) Jobe Stewart	Erebus Motorsport	Chevrolet Camaro ZL1	37	+ 53.207	23	23
17	888	(Australia) Will Brown	Triple Eight Race Engineering	Ford Mustang S650	37	+ 57.205	5	21
18	777	(Australia) Declan Fraser	PremiAir Racing	Chevrolet Camaro ZL1	37	+ 57.428	19	19
19	99	(Australia) Cooper Murray	Erebus Motorsport	Chevrolet Camaro ZL1	37	+ 1:00.760	17	18
20	3	(Australia) Aaron Cameron	Blanchard Racing Team	Ford Mustang S650	37	+ 1:04.309	12	16
21	11	(Australia) Jackson Walls	Triple Eight Race Engineering	Ford Mustang S650	37	+ 1:06.964	24	15
22	96	(Australia) Macauley Jones	Brad Jones Racing	Toyota GR Supra	35	+ 2 laps	20	14
Ret	14	(Australia) Cameron Hill	Brad Jones Racing	Toyota GR Supra	5	Accident damage	22	0
Ret	500	(Australia) David Reynolds	Team 18	Chevrolet Camaro ZL1	1	Accident damage	18	0
Fastest Lap: Ryan Wood (Walkinshaw TWG Racing) - 1:22.4279 on lap 24

=== Race 2 ===
Pos.	No.	Driver	Team	Car	Laps	Time/Retired	Grid	Pts
1	17	(Australia) Brodie Kostecki	Dick Johnson Racing	Ford Mustang S650	37	52:23.961	1	80
2	26	(Australia) Kai Allen	Grove Racing	Ford Mustang S650	37	+ 0.598	4	74
3	2	(New Zealand) Ryan Wood	Walkinshaw TWG Racing	Toyota GR Supra	37	+ 8.611	6	68
4	888	(Australia) Will Brown	Triple Eight Race Engineering	Ford Mustang S650	37	+ 9.002	7	62
5	88	(Australia) Broc Feeney	Triple Eight Race Engineering	Ford Mustang S650	37	+ 10.159	5	57
6	18	(Australia) Anton De Pasquale	Team 18	Chevrolet Camaro ZL1	37	+ 18.721	17	53
7	6	(Australia) Cam Waters	Tickford Racing	Ford Mustang S650	37	+ 20.427	11	49
8	31	(Australia) Jayden Ojeda	PremiAir Racing	Chevrolet Camaro ZL1	37	+ 21.023	10	45
9	3	(Australia) Aaron Cameron	Blanchard Racing Team	Ford Mustang S650	37	+ 22.178	3	41
10	38	(Australia) Rylan Gray	Dick Johnson Racing	Ford Mustang S650	37	+ 27.029	16	38
11	4	(Australia) Jack Le Brocq	Matt Stone Racing	Chevrolet Camaro ZL1	37	+ 29.773	20	35
12	1	(Australia) Chaz Mostert	Walkinshaw TWG Racing	Toyota GR Supra	37	+ 37.164	14	32
13	55	(Australia) Thomas Randle	Tickford Racing	Ford Mustang S650	37	+ 37.967	13	29
14	10	(Australia) Zach Bates	Matt Stone Racing	Chevrolet Camaro ZL1	37	+ 38.018^{1}	19	27
15	7	(Australia) James Golding	Blanchard Racing Team	Ford Mustang S650	37	+ 38.608	8	25
16	99	(Australia) Cooper Murray	Erebus Motorsport	Chevrolet Camaro ZL1	37	+ 39.320	18	23
17	9	(Australia) Jobe Stewart	Erebus Motorsport	Chevrolet Camaro ZL1	37	+ 43.902	22	21
18	96	(Australia) Macauley Jones	Brad Jones Racing	Toyota GR Supra	37	+ 44.578	23	19
19	19	(New Zealand) Matt Payne	Grove Racing	Ford Mustang S650	37	+ 45.143	2	18
20	777	(Australia) Declan Fraser	PremiAir Racing	Chevrolet Camaro ZL1	37	+ 48.476	15	16
21	20	(Australia) David Reynolds	Team 18	Chevrolet Camaro ZL1	37	+ 51.734	21	15
22	11	(Australia) Jackson Walls	Triple Eight Race Engineering	Ford Mustang S650	37	+ 57.165	24	14
23	8	(New Zealand) Andre Heimgartner	Brad Jones Racing	Toyota GR Supra	31	+ 6 laps	9	13
24	14	(Australia) Cameron Hill	Brad Jones Racing	Toyota GR Supra	30	+ 7 laps	12	12
Fastest Lap: Matt Payne (Grove Racing) - 1:23.0711 on lap 29

Notes

- ^1 – Zach Bates crossed the finishing line in tenth before being given a 15-second penalty for a driving infringement, dropping him to fourteenth.
- ^2 - Grove Racing were penalised 30 Teams Championship points for a pit stop infringement resulting in Matt Payne losing a wheel during the race.

=== Race 3 ===
Pos.	No.	Driver	Team	Car	Laps	Time/Retired	Grid	Pts
1	19	(New Zealand) Matt Payne	Grove Racing	Ford Mustang S650	37	52:13.698	2	80
2	88	(Australia) Broc Feeney	Triple Eight Race Engineering	Ford Mustang S650	37	+ 11.643	6	74
3	7	(Australia) James Golding	Blanchard Racing Team	Ford Mustang S650	37	+ 14.164	7	68
4	2	(New Zealand) Ryan Wood	Walkinshaw TWG Racing	Toyota GR Supra	37	+ 15.438	1	62
5	17	(Australia) Brodie Kostecki	Dick Johnson Racing	Ford Mustang S650	37	+ 18.409	3	57
6	18	(Australia) Anton De Pasquale	Team 18	Chevrolet Camaro ZL1	37	+ 19.890	5	53
7	26	(Australia) Kai Allen	Grove Racing	Ford Mustang S650	37	+ 20.148	4	49
8	6	(Australia) Cam Waters	Tickford Racing	Ford Mustang S650	37	+ 20.612	12	45
9	4	(Australia) Jack Le Brocq	Matt Stone Racing	Chevrolet Camaro ZL1	37	+ 20.919	9	41
10	38	(Australia) Rylan Gray	Dick Johnson Racing	Ford Mustang S650	37	+ 23.062	13	38
11	31	(Australia) Jayden Ojeda	PremiAir Racing	Chevrolet Camaro ZL1	37	+ 26.232	10	35
12	1	(Australia) Chaz Mostert	Walkinshaw TWG Racing	Toyota GR Supra	37	+ 28.428	15	32
13	888	(Australia) Will Brown	Triple Eight Race Engineering	Ford Mustang S650	37	+ 31.717	16	29
14	10	(Australia) Zach Bates	Matt Stone Racing	Chevrolet Camaro ZL1	37	+ 31.961	17	27
15	8	(New Zealand) Andre Heimgartner	Brad Jones Racing	Toyota GR Supra	31	+ 32.871	11	25
16	14	(Australia) Cameron Hill	Brad Jones Racing	Toyota GR Supra	30	+ 35.825	20	23
17	55	(Australia) Thomas Randle	Tickford Racing	Ford Mustang S650	37	+ 45.446	21	21
18	99	(Australia) Cooper Murray	Erebus Motorsport	Chevrolet Camaro ZL1	37	+ 46.711	18	19
19	20	(Australia) David Reynolds	Team 18	Chevrolet Camaro ZL1	37	+ 47.784	23	18
20	9	(Australia) Jobe Stewart	Erebus Motorsport	Chevrolet Camaro ZL1	37	+ 48.013	14	16
21	3	(Australia) Aaron Cameron	Blanchard Racing Team	Ford Mustang S650	37	+ 51.742	8	15
22	777	(Australia) Declan Fraser	PremiAir Racing	Chevrolet Camaro ZL1	37	+ 59.768^{1}	19	14
23	96	(Australia) Macauley Jones	Brad Jones Racing	Toyota GR Supra	37	+ 1:00.799	22	13
24	11	(Australia) Jackson Walls	Triple Eight Race Engineering	Ford Mustang S650	37	+ 1:03.871	24	12
Fastest Lap: Matt Payne (Grove Racing) - 1:22.4964 on lap 2

Notes

- ^1 – Declan Fraser was given a 5-second penalty. His finishing position was unaffected by this.

=== Race 4 ===
Pos.	No.	Driver	Team	Car	Laps	Time/Retired	Grid	Pts
1	19	(New Zealand) Matt Payne	Grove Racing	Ford Mustang S650	61	1:30.06.0175	1	145
2	26	(Australia) Kai Allen	Grove Racing	Ford Mustang S650	61	+ 1.125	6	129
3	88	(Australia) Broc Feeney	Triple Eight Race Engineering	Ford Mustang S650	61	+ 2.064	5	118
4	7	(Australia) James Golding	Blanchard Racing Team	Ford Mustang S650	61	+ 5.889	10	109
5	6	(Australia) Cam Waters	Tickford Racing	Ford Mustang S650	61	+ 6.809	8	100
6	888	(Australia) Will Brown	Triple Eight Race Engineering	Ford Mustang S650	61	+ 7.199	4	92
7	4	(Australia) Jack Le Brocq	Matt Stone Racing	Chevrolet Camaro ZL1	61	+ 8.421	13	85
8	8	(New Zealand) Andre Heimgartner	Brad Jones Racing	Toyota GR Supra	61	+ 8.685	20	78
9	99	(Australia) Cooper Murray	Erebus Motorsport	Chevrolet Camaro ZL1	61	+ 8.999	14	72
10	777	(Australia) Declan Fraser	PremiAir Racing	Chevrolet Camaro ZL1	61	+ 9.296	23	66
11	18	(Australia) Anton De Pasquale	Team 18	Chevrolet Camaro ZL1	61	+ 9.673	2	61
12	14	(Australia) Cameron Hill	Brad Jones Racing	Toyota GR Supra	61	+ 10.427	24	56
13	20	(Australia) David Reynolds	Team 18	Chevrolet Camaro ZL1	61	+ 10.805	21	51
14	31	(Australia) Jayden Ojeda	PremiAir Racing	Chevrolet Camaro ZL1	61	+ 11.089	17	47
15	10	(Australia) Zach Bates	Matt Stone Racing	Chevrolet Camaro ZL1	61	+ 12.706	12	44
16	96	(Australia) Macauley Jones	Brad Jones Racing	Toyota GR Supra	61	+ 13.776	22	40
17	1	(Australia) Chaz Mostert	Walkinshaw TWG Racing	Toyota GR Supra	61	+ 35.475	11	37
18	17	(Australia) Brodie Kostecki	Dick Johnson Racing	Ford Mustang S650	61	+ 37.653	7	34
19	55	(Australia) Thomas Randle	Tickford Racing	Ford Mustang S650	60	+ 1 lap	16	31
20	9	(Australia) Jobe Stewart	Erebus Motorsport	Chevrolet Camaro ZL1	56	+ 5 laps	15	29
21	11	(Australia) Jackson Walls	Triple Eight Race Engineering	Ford Mustang S650	50	+ 11 laps	18	26
Ret	2	(New Zealand) Ryan Wood	Walkinshaw TWG Racing	Toyota GR Supra	54	Mechanical	3	
Ret	38	(Australia) Rylan Gray	Dick Johnson Racing	Ford Mustang S650	1	Accident damage	19	
Ret	3	(Australia) Aaron Cameron	Blanchard Racing Team	Ford Mustang S650	1	Accident damage	9	
Fastest Lap: Matt Payne (Grove Racing) - 1:21.9256 on lap 49

Notes

- ^1 – Chaz Mostert crossed the finishing line in fourth before being given a 30-second penalty for a driving infringement involving Brodie Kostecki, dropping him to seventeenth.

== Aftermath ==
=== Championship standings ===
Drivers' Championship standings

Pos.	Driver	Points
1	(Australia) Broc Feeney	925
2	(Australia) Brodie Kostecki	902
3	(New Zealand) Matt Payne	879
4	(Australia) Cam Waters	787
5	(Australia) Kai Allen	728

Teams' Championship standings

Pos.	Constructor	Points
1	Triple Eight Race Engineering	1557
2	Grove Racing	1547
3	Walkinshaw TWG Racing	1291
4	Tickford Racing (6 & 55)	1249
5	Dick Johnson Racing	1234

- Note: Only the top five positions are included for both sets of standings.
