= 2026 New Zealand Formula Ford Championship =

Motor racing competition

The 2026 New Zealand Formula Ford Championship (known for commercial reasons as the 2026 NAPA Auto Parts New Zealand Formula Ford Championship) was a motor racing championship for drivers of Formula Ford racing cars. It was the 55th national series for Formula Fords to be held in New Zealand. The season began at Teretonga Park on 24 January and concluded at Taupo International Motorsport Park on 29 March. The series also held a non-championship event called the Rodin Cars New Zealand Formula Ford Challenge at Euromarque Motorsport Park as part of the Christchurch Super 440 support package.

Marco Manson won the championship after a dominant campaign that included four pole positions, eight fastest laps and eleven race victories. As part of winning the title, Manson received a private test with Rodin Motorsport at their Mount Lyford facility and would test British Formula 4 machinery at the Pembrey Circuit in Wales with the team later that season.

In the regional championships, William Beck won the North Island Formula Ford Championship while Manson claimed the South Island Formula Ford Championship.

== Calendar ==
The schedule for the 2026 New Zealand Formula Ford season was announced in July 2025.

Round	Circuit	Date	Supporting	Map of circuit locations
1	Teretonga Park (Invercargill, Southland)	24–25 January	Formula Regional Oceania Trophy; GR86 Championship New Zealand; TA2 NZ Championship	2026 New Zealand Formula Ford Championship is located in New Zealand
2	Timaru International Motor Raceway (Timaru, Canterbury)	31 January–1 February	Trust Aoraki Thunder Down Under	2026 New Zealand Formula Ford Championship is located in New Zealand
3	Hampton Downs Motorsport Park (Hampton Downs, Waikato)	14–15 March	NEXEN Tyre Mazda Racing Series; NZV8 Ute Racing Series	2026 New Zealand Formula Ford Championship is located in New Zealand
4	Taupo International Motorsport Park (Taupō, Waikato)	28–29 March	NEXEN Tyre Mazda Racing Series; NZV8 Ute Racing Series	2026 New Zealand Formula Ford Championship is located in New Zealand
NC	Euromarque Motorsport Park (Christchurch, Canterbury)	17–19 April	Supercars Championship	2026 New Zealand Formula Ford Championship is located in New Zealand

== Results and standings ==
=== Season summary ===
Rnd		Circuit	Pole position	Fastest lap	Winning driver	Winning team
1	R1	Teretonga Park (Invercargill, Southland)	(New Zealand) Marco Manson	(New Zealand) Marco Manson	(Australia) Sebastian Eskandari-Marandi	Nigel Barclay Racing Projects
1	R2	Teretonga Park (Invercargill, Southland)		(New Zealand) Marco Manson	(Australia) Sebastian Eskandari-Marandi	Nigel Barclay Racing Projects
1	R3	Teretonga Park (Invercargill, Southland)		(New Zealand) Campbell Owens	(New Zealand) Marco Manson	M2 Competition
2	R1	Timaru International Motor Raceway (Timaru, Canterbury)	(New Zealand) Marco Manson	(New Zealand) Marco Manson	(New Zealand) Marco Manson	M2 Competition
2	R2	Timaru International Motor Raceway (Timaru, Canterbury)		(Australia) Mathew Basso	(New Zealand) Marco Manson	M2 Competition
2	R3	Timaru International Motor Raceway (Timaru, Canterbury)		(Australia) Toby Musico	(New Zealand) Maxim Kirwan	Maxim Kirwan Racing
2	R4	Timaru International Motor Raceway (Timaru, Canterbury)		(New Zealand) Maxim Kirwan	(New Zealand) Marco Manson	M2 Competition
3	R1	Hampton Downs Motorsport Park (Hampton Downs, Waikato)	(New Zealand) Marco Manson	(New Zealand) Marco Manson	(New Zealand) Marco Manson	M2 Competition
3	R2	Hampton Downs Motorsport Park (Hampton Downs, Waikato)		(New Zealand) Marco Manson	(New Zealand) Marco Manson	M2 Competition
3	R3	Hampton Downs Motorsport Park (Hampton Downs, Waikato)		(New Zealand) Toby McCormack	(New Zealand) Marco Manson	M2 Competition
3	R4	Hampton Downs Motorsport Park (Hampton Downs, Waikato)		(New Zealand) Marco Manson	(New Zealand) Maxim Kirwan	Maxim Kirwan Racing
4	R1	Taupo International Motorsport Park (Taupo, Waikato)	(New Zealand) Marco Manson	(New Zealand) Marco Manson	(New Zealand) Marco Manson	M2 Competition
4	R2	Taupo International Motorsport Park (Taupo, Waikato)		(New Zealand) Marco Manson	(New Zealand) Marco Manson	M2 Competition
4	R3	Taupo International Motorsport Park (Taupo, Waikato)		(Australia) Sebastian Eskandari-Marandi	(New Zealand) Marco Manson	M2 Competition
4	R4	Taupo International Motorsport Park (Taupo, Waikato)		(New Zealand) Maxim Kirwan	(New Zealand) Marco Manson	M2 Competition
NC	R1	Euromarque Motorsport Park (Christchurch, Canterbury)	(New Zealand) Marco Manson	(New Zealand) Marco Manson	(New Zealand) Marco Manson	M2 Competition
NC	R2	Euromarque Motorsport Park (Christchurch, Canterbury)		(New Zealand) Jake Bryant	(New Zealand) Jake Bryant	
NC	R3	Euromarque Motorsport Park (Christchurch, Canterbury)		(New Zealand) Arthur Broughan	(New Zealand) Arthur Broughan	Nigel Barclay Racing Projects
NC	R4	Euromarque Motorsport Park (Christchurch, Canterbury)		(New Zealand) Marco Manson	(New Zealand) Marco Manson	M2 Competition

=== Championship standings ===
Pos.	Driver	TER			TIM				HAM				TAU				RUA				Points
Pos.	Driver	R1	R2	R3	R1	R2	R3	R4	R1	R2	R3	R4	R1	R2	R3	R4	R1	R2	R3	R4	Points
1	(New Zealand) Marco Manson	9	5	1	1	1	2	1	1	1	1	Ret	1	1	1	1	1	Ret	3	1	985
2	(Australia) Sebastian Eskandari-Marandi	1	1	5	7	4	8	4	3	6	3	2	4	3	4	2	5	2	13	4	890
3	(New Zealand) Maxim Kirwan	10	6	9	2	2	1	2	Ret	3	2	1	3	10	7	7	3	Ret	2	2	795
4	(New Zealand) Dylan Petch	2	3	4	3	7	Ret	6	4	5	8	6	6	2	3	4	13	6	Ret	Ret	775
5	(Australia) Mathew Basso	6	7	7	11	6	3	5	9	8	9	9	12	7	8	11					638
6	(New Zealand) Izaak Fletcher	5	4	8	14	5	5	10	8	9	6	13	9	6	9	6	6	4	14	9	610
7	(New Zealand) Jacob Begg	4	2	6	8	10	9	9	7	Ret	5	5	8	Ret	6	5					607
8	(Australia) Toby Musico	Ret	Ret	3	Ret	12	7	3	6	7	4	4	7	5	5	9					595
9	(New Zealand) William Beck	7	9	10	10	13	10	13	10	10	10	8	10	8	10	12					543
10	(New Zealand) Olivia Lorenzen	8	10	11	13	14	Ret	DNS	13	13	11	11	13	11	12	10	14	12	11	13	400
11	(New Zealand) Toby McCormack	Ret	Ret	DNS	6	9	12	8	5	4	Ret	3	5	Ret	DNS	DNS					418
12	(New Zealand) Campbell Owens	3	8	2	5	8	4	7	2	2	7	7	2	4	2	3					358
Guest driver ineligible for points
	(New Zealand) Arthur Broughan																2	3	1	3	0
	(New Zealand) Jake Bryant				4	3	6	11									4	1	Ret	5	0
	(New Zealand) Andrew Neale																8	7	4	11	0
	(New Zealand) William Neale																7	5	Ret	7	0
	(New Zealand) Ryan Low																Ret	9	5	Ret	0
	(New Zealand) Cameron Freeman				9	11	11	12									9	8	6	17	0
	(Australia) Lincoln Taylor																10	Ret	Ret	6	0
	(New Zealand) Thomas Flynn																Ret	10	7	12	0
	(New Zealand) Oliver Sentch								11	Ret	DNS	DNS	11	9	11	8					0
	(New Zealand) Hamish Carpenter																DNS	14	8	10	0
	(Australia) Oli Wickham																Ret	Ret	Ret	8	0
	(New Zealand) Dyson Freeman				12	DNS	13	Ret									DNS	13	9	16	0
	(New Zealand) Jack Groenewald								12	11	14	10									0
	(New Zealand) Ayven Dunn																12	11	10	14	0
	(New Zealand) Andrew Downs																11	15	12	15	0
	(New Zealand) James Collie								Ret	12	12	12	14	12	Ret	Ret					0
	(New Zealand) Matthew Christian																15	Ret	Ret	Ret	0
	(New Zealand) Jordan Michels																Ret	WD	WD	WD	0
Pos.	Driver	R1	R2	R3	R1	R2	R3	R4	R1	R2	R3	R4	R1	R2	R3	R4	R1	R2	R3	R4	Points
Pos.	Driver	TER			TIM				HAM				TAU				RUA				Points
