= Charles Lucas Engineering =

Charles Lucas Engineering were manufacturers of Titan Formula cars from 1967 to 1976 and engines and components for racing cars. The company was renamed Titan Motorsport and Manufacturing Ltd after it ceased car manufacturing.

== Origins ==
Charles Lucas was a qualified engineer who had started racing in the early 1960s. In 1963, his friends got involved with the then new Formula 3 class of cars. In 1964, Lucas had a clone Lotus 31 built for him by Roy Thomas. In 1965, he managed and raced in a team with Brabham BT10s. This was so successful that Colin Chapman had Charles Lucas Engineering run the Lotus Formula 3 works team in 1966. A disagreement between Colin Chapman and Charles Lucas over bonus money resulted in the parting ways, with Lucas going on to start building his own cars in Highgate, London with his partner, Roy Thomas. The factory was moved to a purpose-built facility in Huntingdon, Cambridgeshire in February 1968. It was located near the companies key suppliers, Arch Motors who made the frames and Specialised Mouldings Ltd who made the fiberglass bodies. The cars were sold in the United States by Fred Opert Racing in New Jersey and Pierre Phillips Racing in Oregon.

== Company names and owners ==
In 1971 Lucas sold the company to Roy and Diana Thomas. They reformed and renamed the company as Titan Cars St. Neots Limited on 21 May 1975. The company was renamed Titan Motorpsort and Manufacturing Company on 31 May 1980 and renamed again on 13 September 2006 as Titan Motorsport and Automotive Engineering Limited. The majority shareholders in the company as at March 2021 were Diana Thomas and Laurence Timms.

== Titan Formula Cars ==
Titan racing cars were open seaters raced in Formula 2, Formula 3, and Formula's Ford, Libre, Renault, and Atlantic events. The last model made by Titan was the Mark 10, with the final car being made in 1976.

=== Mark 1 and 2 ===
Two individual non-production race cars.

=== Mark 3 ===
The first Titan racing car was the Titan Mark 3. It debuted at Silverstone on 15 July 1967 and won the race with Charles Lucas at the wheel. The car was powered by a prototype downdraft MAE engine and the win resulted in Charles Lucas Engineering receiving 100 orders for the engine the next day. This engine was to become the mainstay of Formula 3 racing until 1970 when the Formula 3 specifications were changed.

=== Mark 4 ===
A Mark 3 car converted to Formula Ford specifications in 1968.

=== Mark 5 ===
The Mark 5, created in 1969, was a Mark 4 modified to take the Hewland Mk8 gearbox. There were also some other more minor modifications over the Mark 4.

=== Mark 6 ===
The Mark 6 was introduced in 1970 in response to the ever improving design of Formula Ford cars by other manufacturers. The car had improved front suspension and the bodywork was redesigned to improve down force and airflow. More than 300 were built between 1969 and 1974.

=== Mark 7 ===
A Formula Super Vee project that did not proceed.

=== Mark 8 ===
The Mark 8 was a failure and led to the demise of Titan's racing car manufacture. It had been hastily put into production without sufficient testing. As a result of its poor performance Titan had to make an update kit for the car while it set about development of the Mark 9

=== Mark 9 ===
Replacement for the poor performing Mark 8

=== Mark 10 ===
Three Mark 10's were made between 1973 and 1976. They were designed by Chris Lucas and George Pike and designed primarily for Formula Renault events.

== Engines and components ==
From 1976 Titan switched its focus solely to engine construction and race car component manufacture. Titan manufacture racing components which are used by companies such as Lola, Dallara, Caterham, Cosworth, and Morgan cars. They also manufacture components for early Cosworth and Formula ford engines.
