= Kai Allen =

Australian racing driver

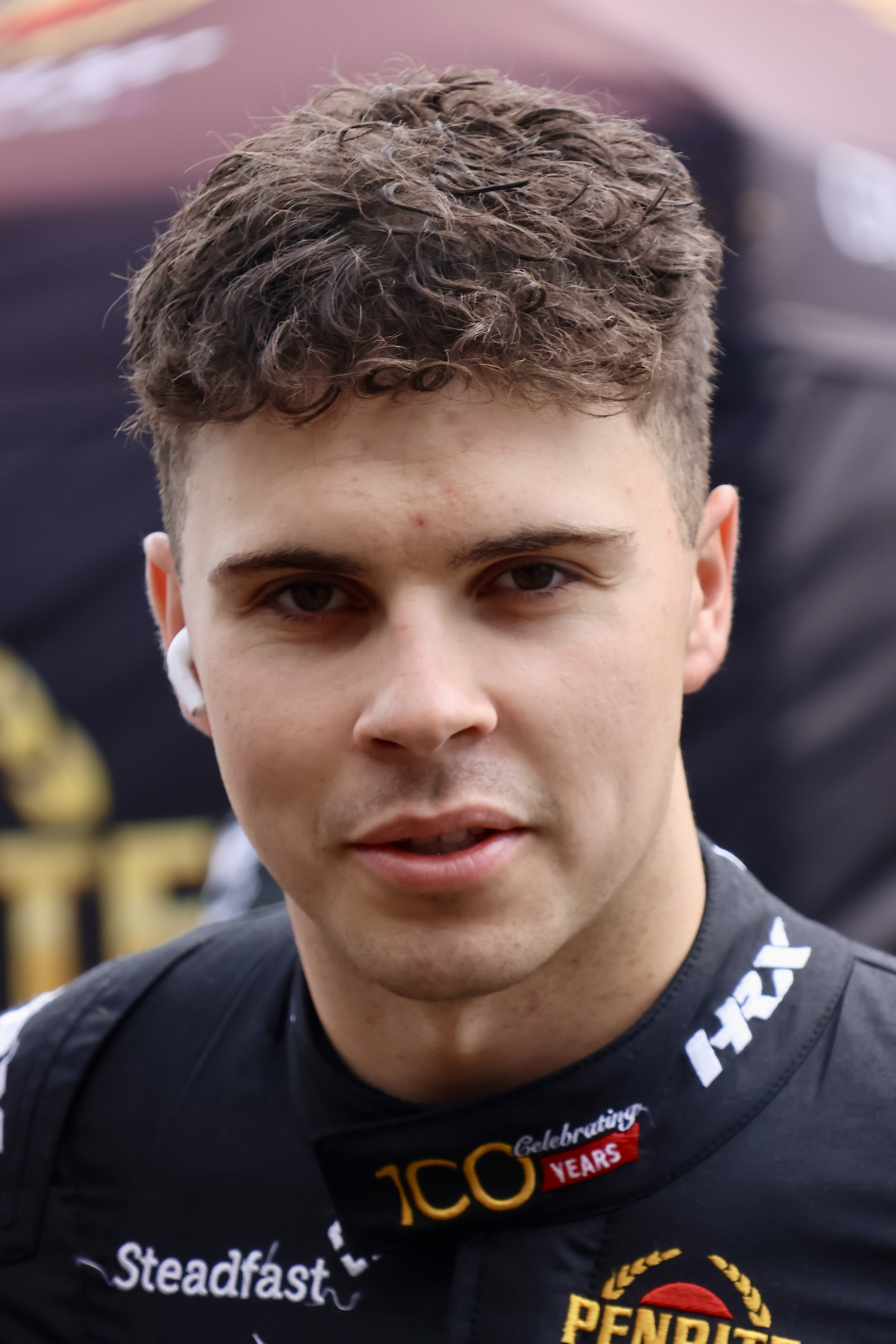
- Allen at the Adelaide Grand Final in 2025
- Nationality: Australian
- Born: 26 June 2005 (age 21) Mount Gambier, South Australia

Supercars Championship
- Years active: 2025
- Teams: Grove Racing
- Starts: 63
- Wins: 2
- Podiums: 12
- Poles: 0
- Best finish: 4th (5223 points) in 2025

Previous series
- 2022 2021 2015-19: Super3 Series; Toyota Gazoo Racing Australia 86 Series; Karting

Championship titles
- 2023 2018 2016: Super2 Series; Australian Kart C/Ship- KA2; Australian Kart C/Ship - Cadet 12

Awards
- 2018 2024: Jon Targett Perpetual Trophy; Motorsport Australia Young Driver of the Year

Kai Allen (born 26 June 2005) is a racing driver from Australia. He currently competes in the No. 26 Ford Mustang for Grove Racing in the Supercars Championship.

== Personal life ==
Allen's sister Nyah is a professional netball player, currently contracted to the Collingwood Magpies.

== Results ==
=== Karting career summary ===
Season	Series	Position
2015	Australian National Kart Championship - KA12	**3rd**
2016	Australian National Kart Championship - Cadet 12	**1st**
2017	Australian National Sprint Kart Championship - KA4 Junior	**3rd**
2018	Australian National Kart Championship - KA2	**1st**
2018	Australian National Kart Championship - KA4 Junior	**2nd**
2018	Victorian State Kart Championship - KA3 Junior	**1st**
2018	South Australian Kart Championship - KA3 Junior	**2nd**
2018	City of Melbourne - KA3 Junior	**1st**
2019	Australian National Sprint Kart Championship - X30	21st
2019	Victorian State Kart Championship - X30	5th
2019	South Australian Kart Championship - X30	6th
2019	City of Melbourne Kart Titles - X30	10th

=== Racing career summary ===
Season	Series	Team	Races	Wins	Poles	F/Laps	Podiums	Points	Position
2021	Toyota Gazoo Racing Australia 86 Series	TekworkX Motorsport	8	0	0	0	2	–	– (Note: Championship was not awarded.)
2022	Super3 Series	Eggleston Motorsport	11	6	11	5	9	1392	**2nd**
2023	Super2 Series	Eggleston Motorsport	12	2	1	2	5	1437	**1st**
2023	Supercars Championship	Dick Johnson Racing	1	0	0	0	0	90	54th
2024	Super2 Series	Eggleston Motorsport	12	4	1	4	5	1329	**3rd**
2024	Supercars Championship	Dick Johnson Racing; Grove Racing	3	0	0	0	0	204	46th
2025	Supercars Championship	Grove Racing	33	0	0	0	5	5223	4th
2025-26	24H Series Middle East - GT3	Grove Racing by GetSpeed							
2026	Supercars Championship	Grove Racing	25	2	0	3	7	5th*	1565*

=== Super3 Series results ===
(key) (Race results only)

Super3 Series results
Year	Team	No.	Car	1	2	3	4	5	6	7	8	9	10	11	12	Position	Points
2022	Eggleston Motorsport	26	Holden VE Commodore	SMP; R1; 2	**SMP**; **R2**; 1	**WAN**; **R3**; 1	**WAN**; **R4**; 1	**TOW**; **R5**; 2	**TOW**; **R6**; 1	**SAN**; **R7**; 1	**SAN**; **R8**; 10	**BAT**; **R9**; 1	**BAT**; **R10**; C	**ADE**; **R11**; 2	**ADE**; **R12**; Ret	2nd	1392

=== Super2 Series results ===
(key) (Race results only)

Super2 Series results
Year	Team	No.	Car	1	2	3	4	5	6	7	8	9	10	11	12	Position	Points
2023	Eggleston Motorsport	26	Holden ZB Commodore	NEW; R1; 4	NEW; R2; 6	WAN; R3; 19	WAN; R4; 4	TOW; R5; 1	**TOW**; **R6**; 2	SAN; R7; 4	SAN; R8; 4	BAT; R9; 3	BAT; R10; 1	ADE; R11; 3	ADE; R12; 5	1st	1437
2024	Eggleston Motorsport	1	Holden ZB Commodore	BAT1; R1; 1	**BAT1**; **R2**; 1	WAN; R3; 1	WAN; R4; 8	TOW; R5; 5	TOW; R6; 1	SAN; R7; 4	SAN; R8; 5	BAT2; R9; 14	BAT2; R10; Ret	ADE; R11; 7	ADE; R12; 2	3rd	1329

=== Supercars Championship results ===
(key) (Races in bold indicate pole position) (Races in italics indicate fastest lap)

Supercars results
Year	Team	Car	1	2	3	4	5	6	7	8	9	10	11	12	13	14	15	16	17	18	19	20	21	22	23	24	25	26	27	28	29	30	31	32	33	34	35	36	37	Position	Points	
2023	Dick Johnson Racing	98	Ford Mustang S650	NEW; R1	NEW; R2	MEL; R3	MEL; R4	MEL; R5	MEL; R6	BAR; R7	BAR; R8	BAR; R9	SYM; R10	SYM; R11	SYM; R12	HID; R13	HID; R14	HID; R15	TOW; R16	TOW; R17	SMP; R18	SMP; R19	BEN; R20	BEN; R21	BEN; R22	SAN; R23	BAT; R24; 20	SUR; R25	SUR; R26	ADE; R27	ADE; R28										54th	90
2024	Dick Johnson Racing	17	Ford Mustang S650	BAT1; R1	BAT1; R2	MEL; R3	MEL; R4	MEL; R5	MEL; R6	TAU; R7	TAU; R8	BAR; R9	BAR; R10	HID; R11	HID; R12	TOW; R13	TOW; R14	SMP; R15	SMP; R16	BEN; R17	BEN; R18	SAN; R19; 24	BAT; R20; 12	SUR; R21	SUR; R22																46th	204
2024	Grove Racing	26	Ford Mustang S650																							ADE; R23; DNS	ADE; R24; 22														46th	204
2025	Grove Racing	26	Ford Mustang S650	SYD; R1; 19	SYD; R2; 23	SYD; R3; 13	MEL; R4; 20	MEL; R5; 12	MEL; R6; 12	MEL; R7; C	TAU; R8; 7	TAU; R9; 10	TAU; R10; 18	SYM; R11; 12	SYM; R12; 18	SYM; R13; 24	BAR; R14; 11	BAR; R15; 11	BAR; R16; 8	HID; R17; 11	HID; R18; 3	HID; R19; 2	TOW; R20; 15	TOW; R21; 19	TOW; R22; 10	QLD; R23; 2	QLD; R24; 20	QLD; R25; 3	BEN; R26; 15	BAT; R27; 8	SUR; R28; 3	SUR; R29; 6	SAN; R30; 7	SAN; R31; 6	ADE; R32; 5	ADE; R33; 5	ADE; R34; 4				4th	5223
2026	Grove Racing	26	Ford Mustang S650	SMP; R1; 11	SMP; R2; 8	SMP; R3; 23	MEL; R4; 11	MEL; R5; 5	MEL; R6; 4	MEL; R7; 9	TAU; R8; 23	TAU; R9; 8	CHR; R10; 1	CHR; R11; 2	CHR; R12; 7	CHR; R13; 2	SYM; R14; 19	SYM; R15; 6	SYM; R16; 3	HID; R17; 2	HID; R18; 1	HID; R19; 6	TOW; R20; 4	TOW; R21; 12	TOW; R22; 7	BAR; R23; 6	BAR; R24; 3	BAR; R25; 5	QLD; R26	QLD; R27	QLD; R28	BEN; R28	BAT; R30	SUR; R31	SUR; R32	SAN; R33	SAN; R34	ADE; R35	ADE; R36	ADE; R37	5th*	1565*

=== Complete Bathurst 1000 results ===
Year	Team	Car	Co-driver	Position	Laps
2023	Dick Johnson Racing	Ford Mustang S650	(Switzerland) Simona de Silvestro	20th	160
2024	Dick Johnson Racing	Ford Mustang S650	(Australia) Will Davison	12th	161
2025	Grove Racing	Ford Mustang S650	(Australia) Dale Wood	8th	161
2026	Grove Racing	Ford Mustang S650	(Australia) Tim Slade	20th	159
