= Ford Mustang (seventh generation) =

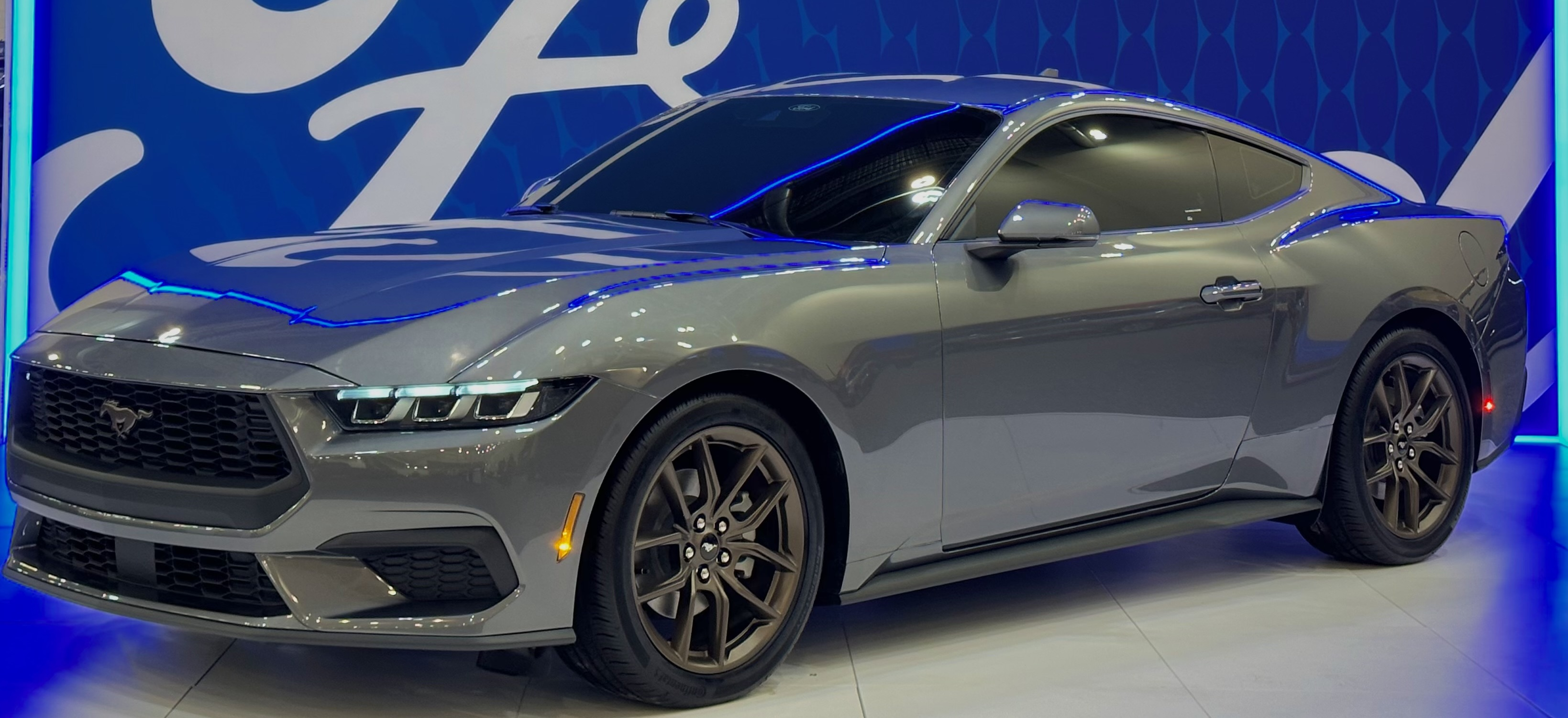
- Ford Mustang EcoBoost

Overview
- Manufacturer: Ford
- Model code: S650
- Production: May 2023 – present
- Model years: 2024–present
- Assembly: United States: Flat Rock, Michigan (Flat Rock Assembly Plant); Canada: Markham, Ontario (Multimatic)
- Designer: Chris Stevens

Body and chassis
- Class: Pony car (D); Muscle car (S) (EcoBoost, GT, and Dark Horse); Sports car (S) (GTD)
- Body style: 2-door coupe; 2-door convertible
- Layout: Front-engine, rear-wheel-drive
- Platform: Ford D2C platform

Powertrain
- Engine: Gasoline: 2.3 L EcoBoost I4; 5.0 L Coyote V8; 5.2 L Predator supercharged V8 (GTD)
- Transmission: 10-speed 10R80 automatic; 6-speed Getrag MT82-D4 manual (GT); 6-speed TREMEC TR-3160 manual (Dark Horse); 7-speed Tremec dual-clutch (Dark Horse SC); 8-speed Tremec dual-clutch (GTD)

Dimensions
- Wheelbase: 107.1 in (2,720 mm)
- Length: Standard: 189.4 in (4,810 mm); Dark Horse: 189.8 in (4,820 mm)
- Width: Standard: 75.4 in (1,915 mm); Dark Horse: 75.6 in (1,920 mm)
- Height: Standard: 54.9–55.1 in (1,395–1,400 mm); Dark Horse: 55.1 in (1,400 mm)
- Curb weight: 3,588–3,741 lb (1,627–1,697 kg) (EcoBoost); 3,827–4,012 lb (1,736–1,820 kg) (GT); 3,949–3,993 lb (1,791–1,811 kg) (Dark Horse)

Chronology
- Predecessor: Ford Mustang (sixth generation)

The Ford Mustang (S650) is the seventh-generation of the Ford Mustang pony car manufactured by Ford. It was first shown at the 2022 North American International Auto Show (known as the Detroit Auto Show), and is assembled at Ford's Flat Rock Assembly Plant and began production on May 1, 2023, initially available with either the redesigned 2.3 L EcoBoost turbocharged 4-cylinder with 315 HP, or the revised, 4th generation Coyote V8 with 480-486 HP in the GT and 500 HP in the Dark Horse.

== Background ==
On September 14, 2022, Ford introduced the seventh-generation Mustang at the North American International Auto Show at a special event called "The Stampede". At the event, several track-only models were showcased, including a NASCAR Cup Series body, a V8 Supercar version, multiple GT racing versions, and others. Also announced was the new “Dark Horse” series to bridge the gap between the Mach 1 and the discontinued Shelby GT350. The Dark Horse performs much the same role as the 2012–2013 Boss 302 Mustangs — a street legal car with enhanced performance for international road courses.

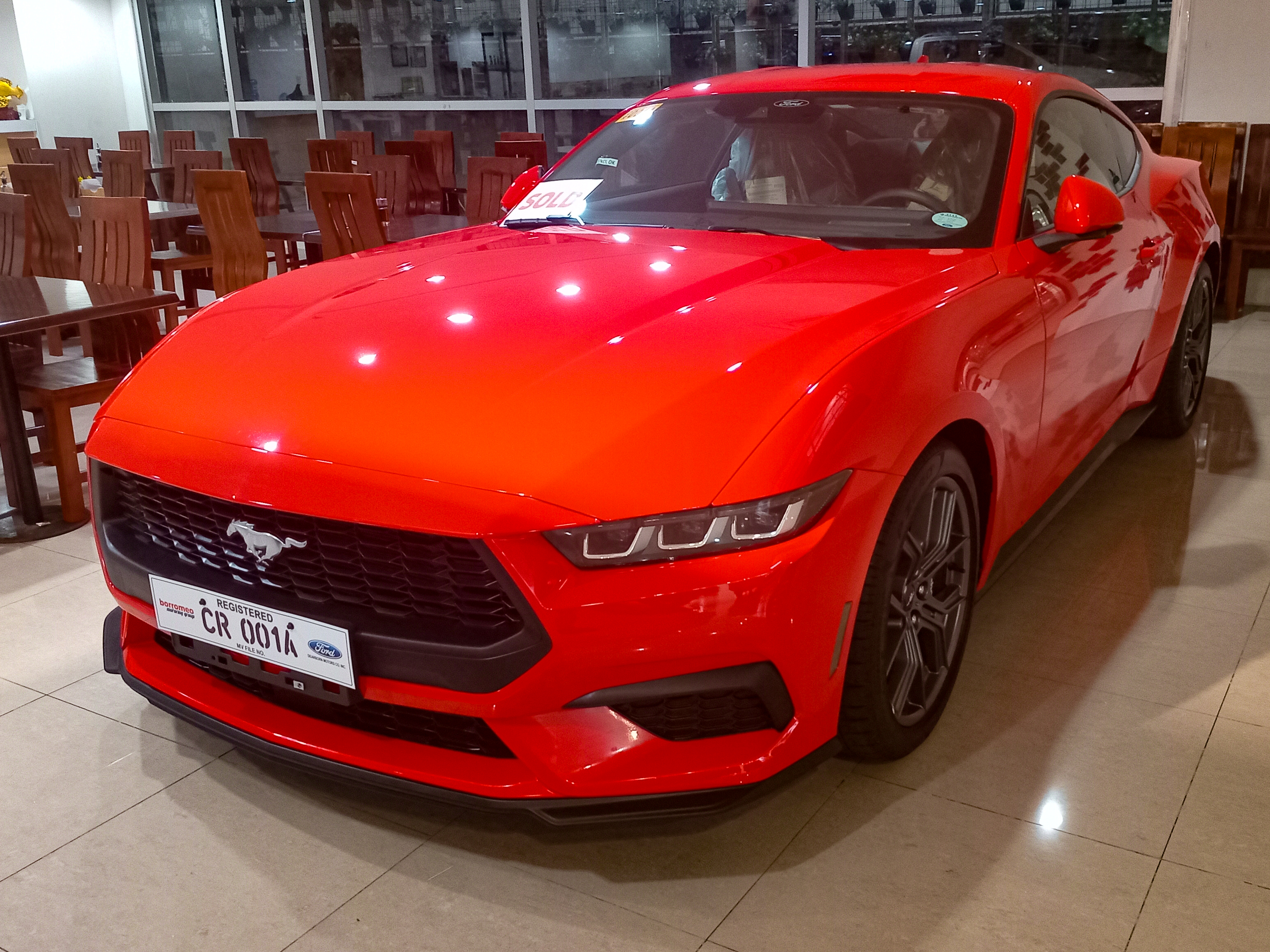
Ford Mustang EcoBoost Front

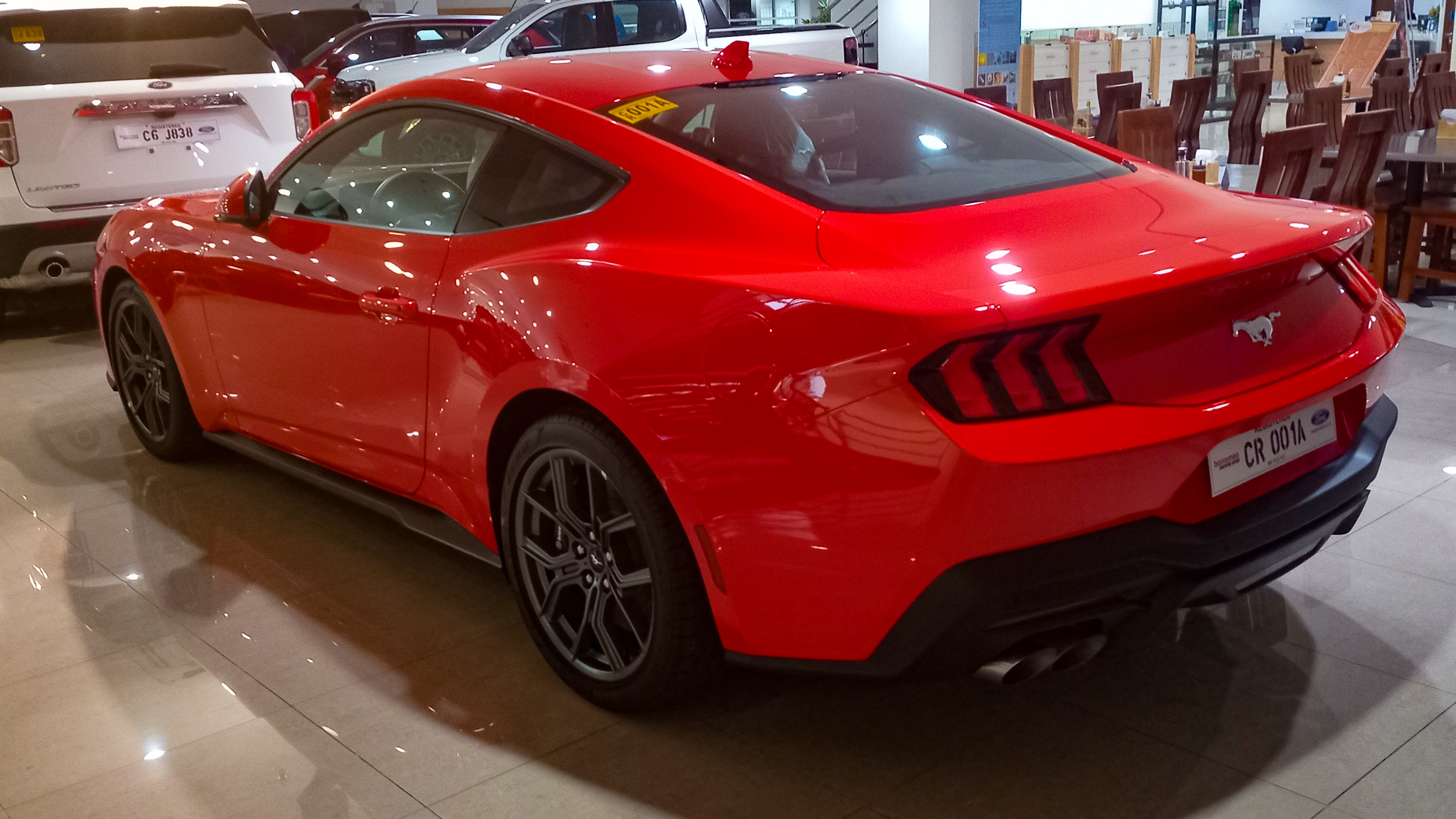
Ford Mustang EcoBoost Rear

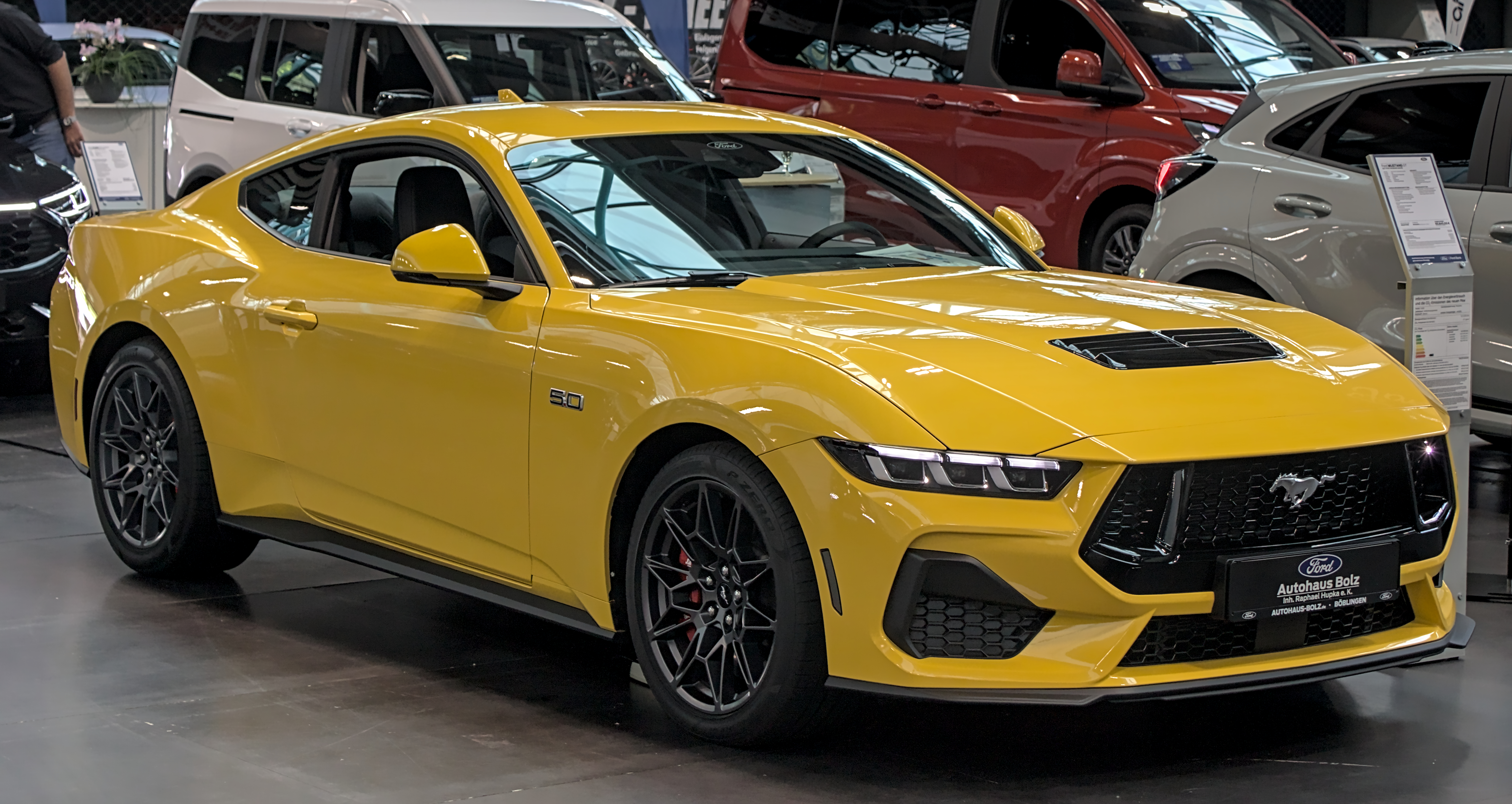
Ford Mustang GT Front

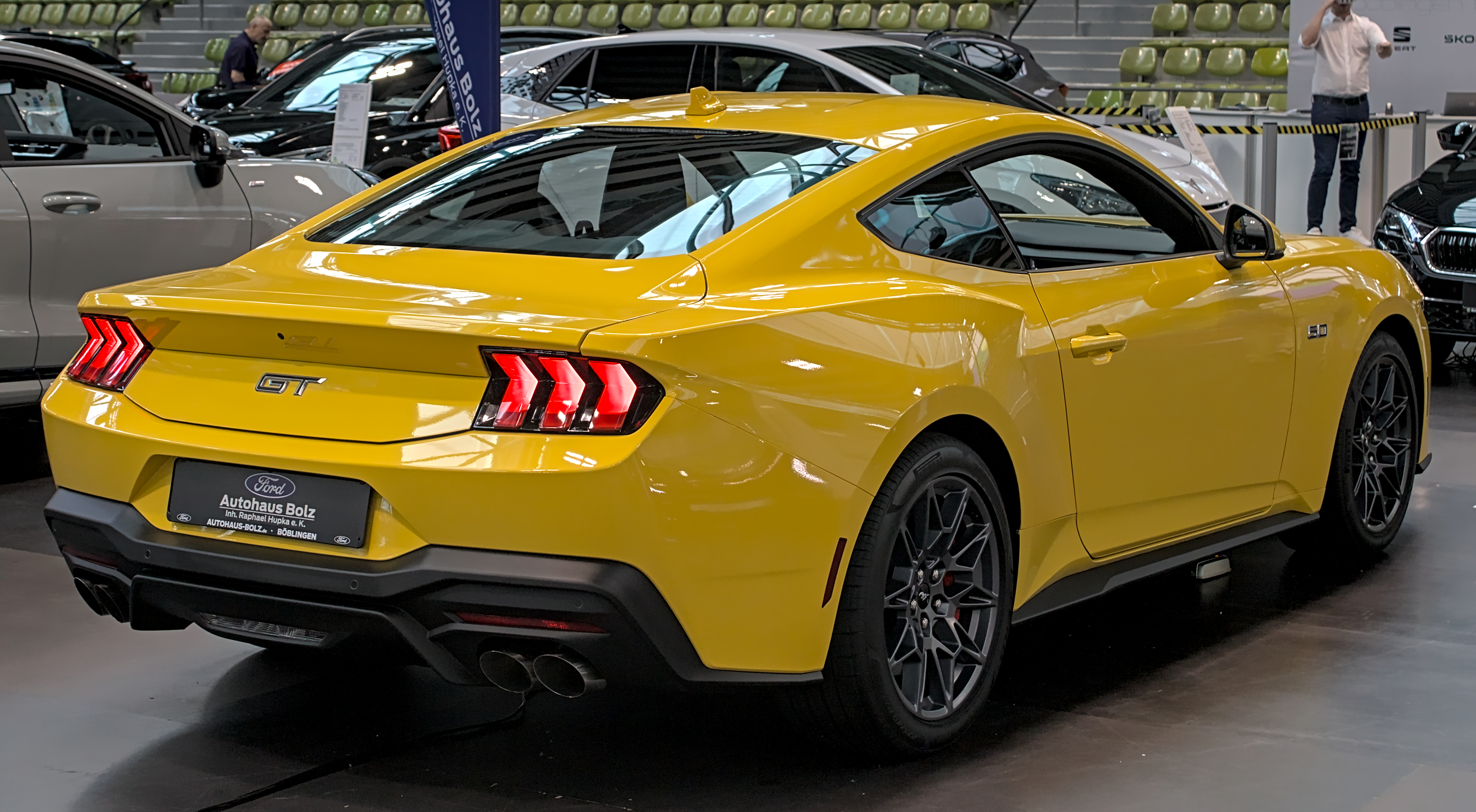
Ford Mustang GT Rear

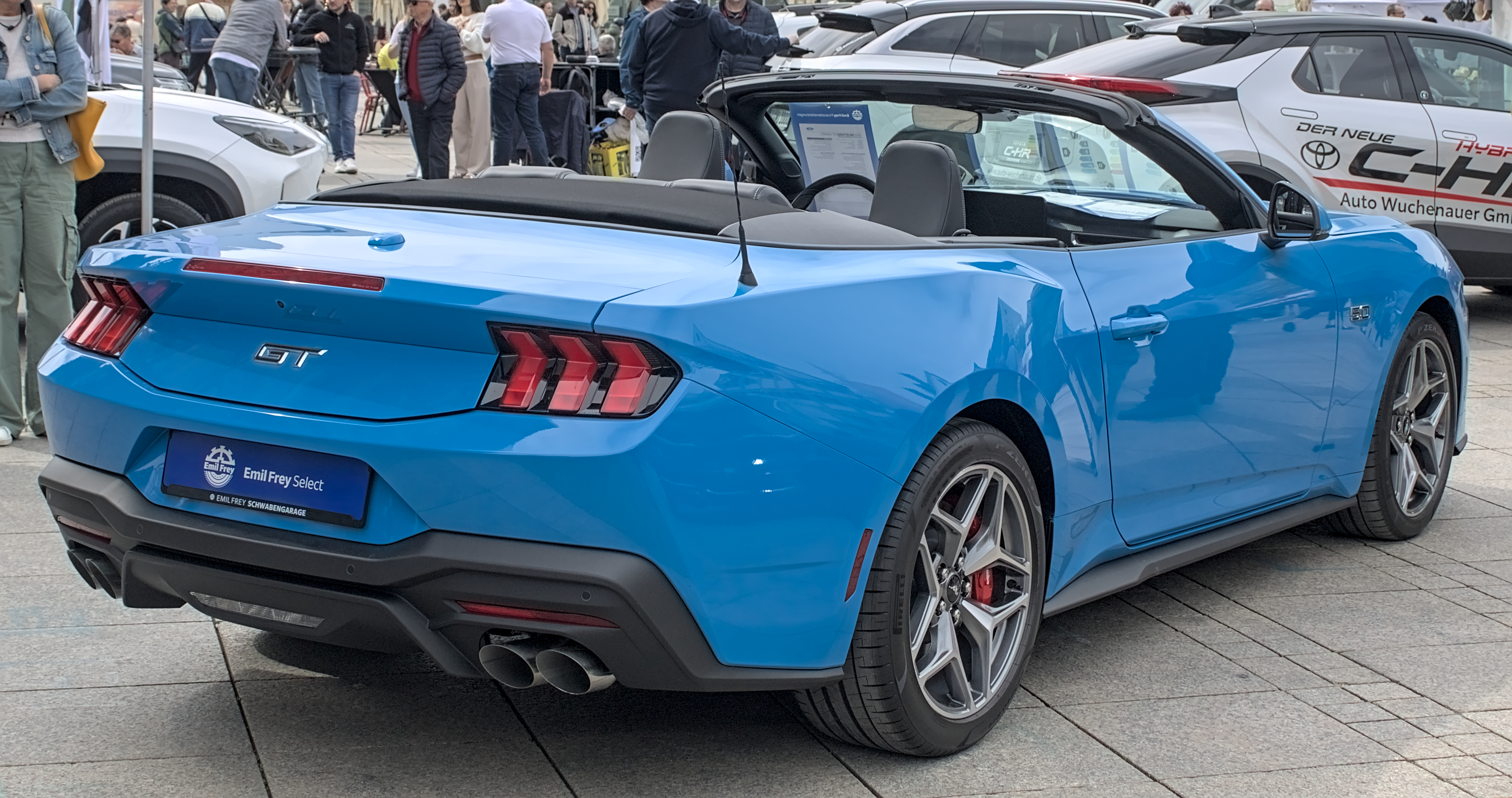
Ford Mustang GT Convertible Rear

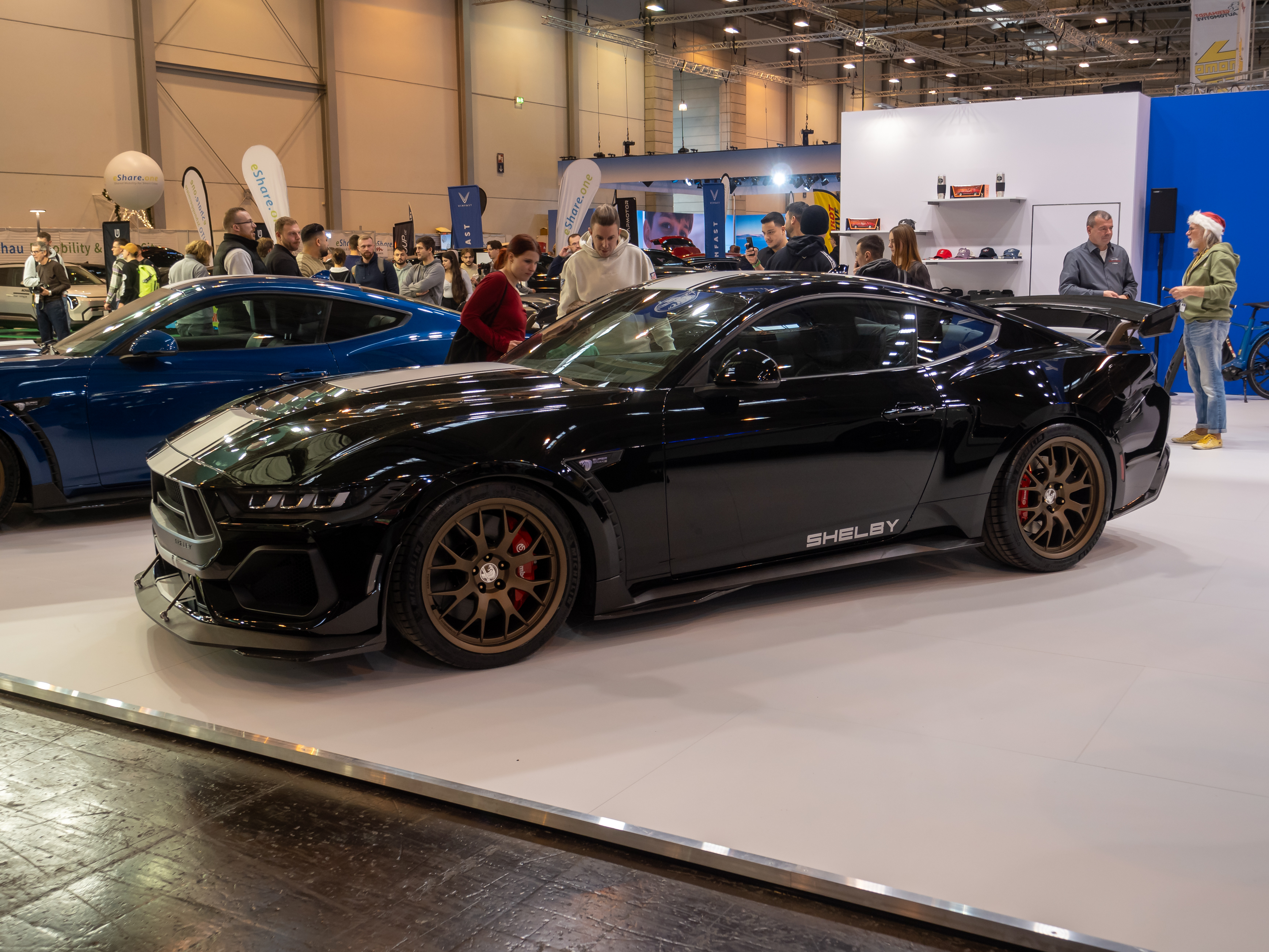
Shelby Mustang Super Snake

== Powertrain ==
=== Engines ===
At launch, two engines were available: a 2.3 L turbocharged I4 (EcoBoost) or a 5.0 L modular V8 (Coyote).

The 2.3 L EcoBoost engine was fully redesigned with a new twin-scroll turbocharger and an electronic waste gate. It utilizes both direct and port fuel injection.

The fourth-generation 5.0 L Coyote V8 engine received internal revisions, and utilizes dual air intakes and throttle bodies.

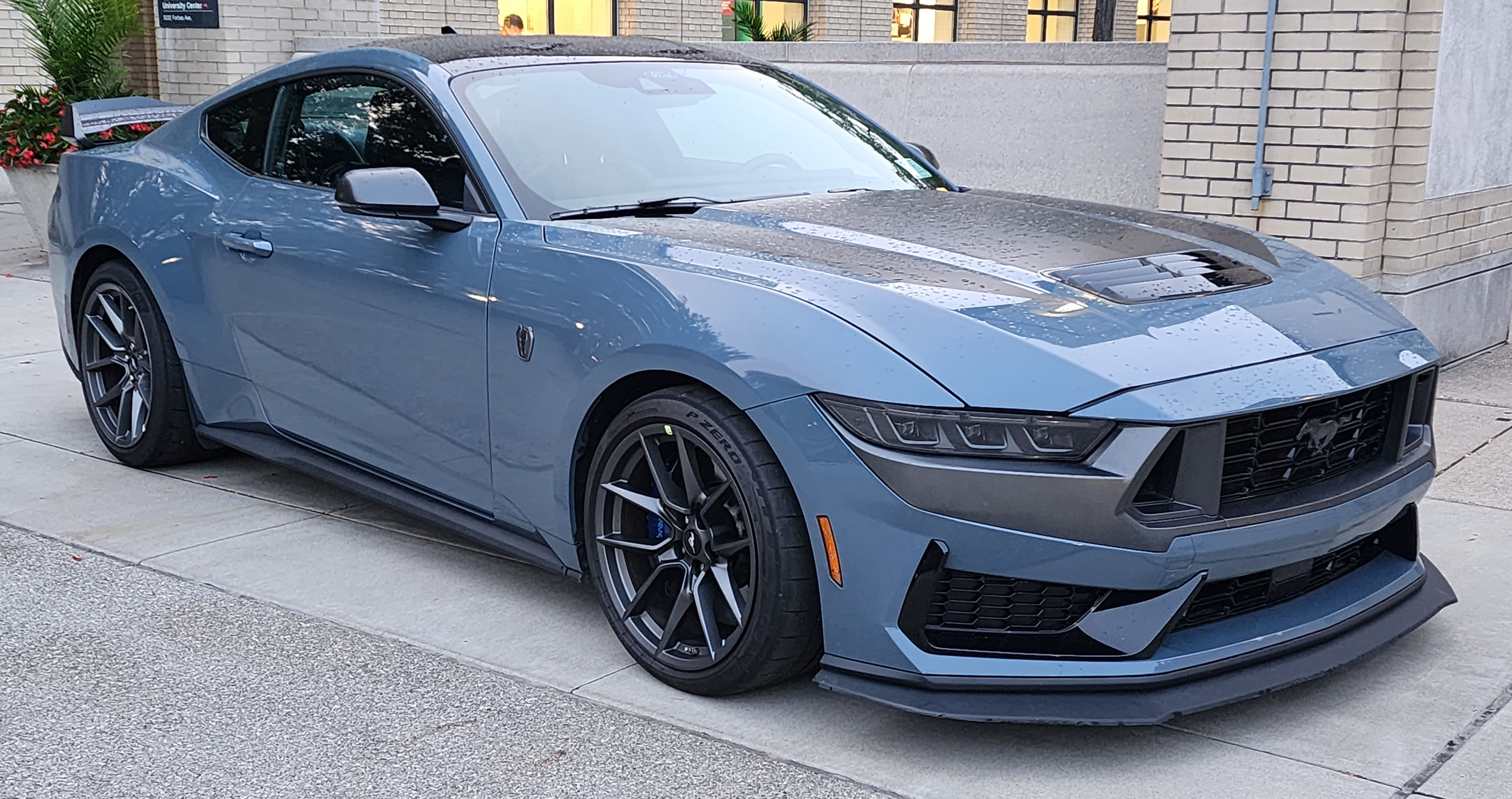
2024 Mustang Dark Horse Front

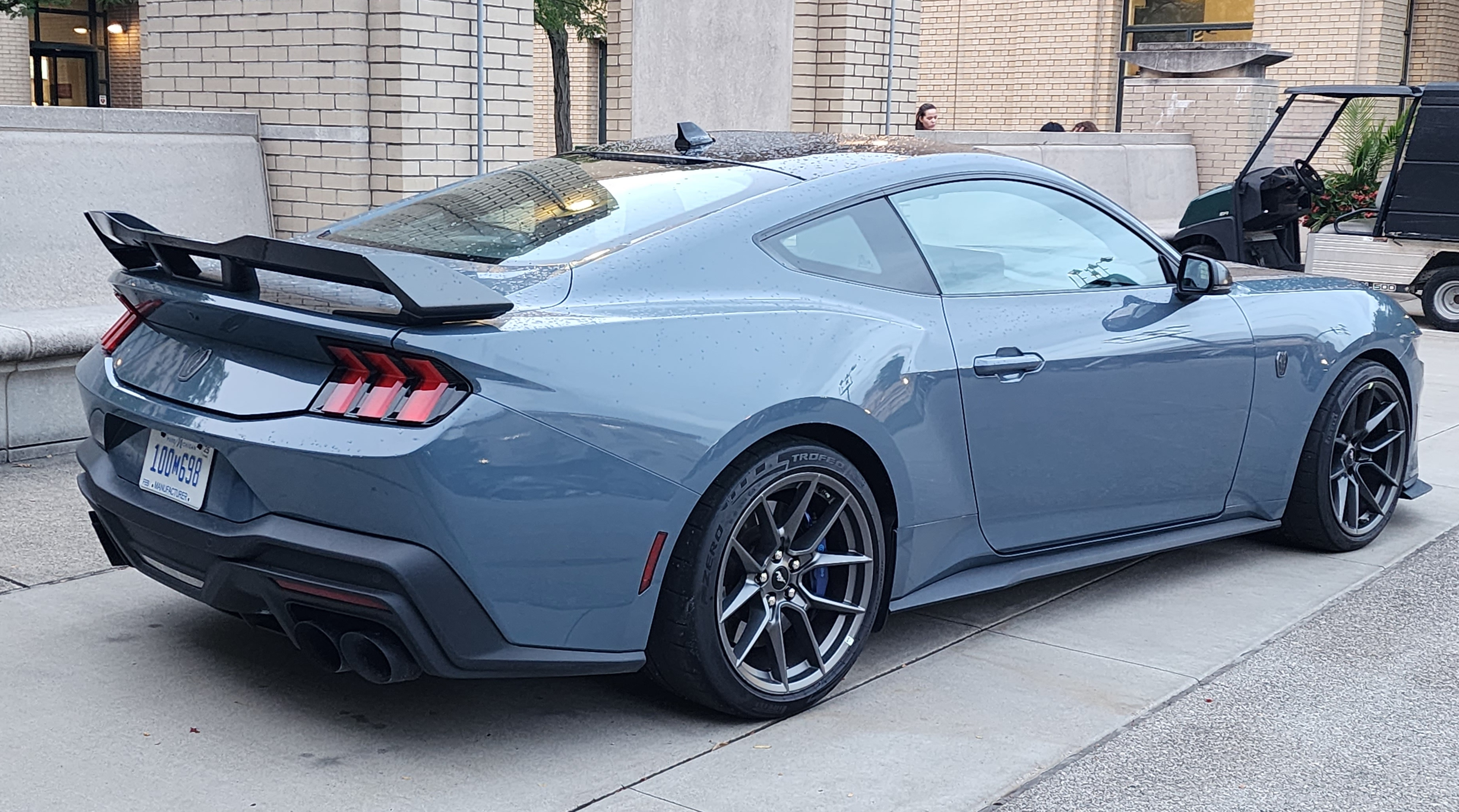
2024 Mustang Dark Horse Rear

The Dark Horse model received a modified version of the 5.0 L V8 featuring a unique crankshaft and forged piston connecting rods from the sixth-generation Shelby GT500.

The Dark Horse SC and the GTD include the 5.2L Supercharged Predator V8 from the sixth-generation Shelby GT500.

Model	Model year	Engine Displacement	Power	Torque	Compression Ratio
EcoBoost	2024–	137.5 cu in (2,253 cc) I4	315 hp (235 kW; 319 PS) at 5,500 rpm	350 lb⋅ft (475 N⋅m) at 3,000 rpm	10.6:1
GT (Europe)	2024–	307.4 cu in (5,037 cc) V8	448 hp (334 kW; 454 PS) at 7,150 rpm	397 lb⋅ft (538 N⋅m) at 4,900 rpm	12:1
GT	2024–	307.4 cu in (5,037 cc) V8	480 hp (360 kW; 490 PS) at 7,150 rpm	415 lb⋅ft (563 N⋅m) at 4,900 rpm	12:1
GT (with active exhaust)	2024–	307.4 cu in (5,037 cc) V8	486 hp (362 kW; 493 PS) at 7,250 rpm	418 lb⋅ft (567 N⋅m) at 4,900 rpm	12:1
Dark Horse (Europe)	2024–	307.4 cu in (5,037 cc) V8	453 hp (338 kW; 459 PS) at 7,250 rpm	397 lb⋅ft (538 N⋅m) at 4,900 rpm	12:1
Dark Horse	2024–	307.4 cu in (5,037 cc) V8	500 hp (370 kW; 510 PS) at 7,250 rpm	418 lb⋅ft (567 N⋅m) at 4,900 rpm	12:1
Dark Horse SC	2026–	315.1 cu in (5,164 cc) V8	795 hp (593 kW; 806 PS)	660 lb⋅ft (895 N⋅m)	
GTD	2025-	315.1 cu in (5,164 cc) V8	815 hp (608 kW; 826 PS) at 7,400 rpm	664 lb⋅ft (900 N⋅m) at 4,800 rpm	

=== Transmissions ===
At launch, three transmissions were offered: a Getrag 6-speed manual (GT only), a Tremec 6-speed manual (Dark Horse only), or a 10-speed automatic transmission. The following tables show the gear ratios for the 6-speed manual and 10-speed automatic transmissions.

6-speed Manual Transmission Gear Ratios
Gear	GT (Getrag MT82-D4)	Dark Horse (Tremec TR-3160)
First	3.237:1	3.25:1
Second	2.104:1	2.23:1
Third	1.422:1	1.61:1
Fourth	1.000:1	1.24:1
Fifth	0.814:1	1.00:1
Sixth	0.622:1	0.63:1
Final Drive	3.55:1 (Standard) 3.73:1 (Performance Package)	3.73:1

10-speed Automatic Transmission Gear Ratios (Ford 10R80)
Gear	Ecoboost and GT	Dark Horse
First	4.696:1	4.70:1
Second	2.985:1	2.99:1
Third	2.146:1	2.15:1
Fourth	1.769:1	1.77:1
Fifth	1.520:1	1.52:1
Sixth	1.275:1	1.28:1
Seventh	1.000:1	1.00:1
Eighth	0.854:1	0.85:1
Ninth	0.689:1	0.69:1
Tenth	0.636:1	0.64:1
Final Drive	3.15:1 (Standard), 3.55:1 (Performance Package)	3.55:1

== Interior ==
=== Dashboard ===
Interior photo showing the digital instrument cluster and infotainment system

The traditional dual-cowl dashboard of previous models was replaced with a full digital instrument display, inspired by the cockpit of a fighter jet. The cockpit consists of a freestanding 12.4 inch digital instrument cluster and 13.4 inch infotainment system, both of which are highly customizable and powered by Unreal Engine. The instrument cluster can display different graphics according to the selected driving mode, and includes designs inspired by previous Mustang generations. The infotainment system incorporates vehicle settings, navigation and entertainment functions, while also providing access to climate-control settings. The intent was to prioritize the digital user experience in an attempt to attract a younger demographic accustomed to high-end tech interfaces.

=== Centre console and controls ===
The centre console houses USB-A and USB-C connectivity ports, two cup holders and a storage compartment beneath the centre armrest. A wireless charging pad was available in earlier model years, but was removed from Australian-market vehicles for the 2025 model year.

The conventional mechanical handbrake used in previous generations was replaced by an electronically operated parking brake. On models equipped with the Performance Package, the system incorporates a lever styled after a traditional handbrake, known as the Performance Electronic Parking Brake. Developed with input from professional drifter Vaughn Gittin Jr., the system can also function as a drift brake, momentarily applying the rear brakes to initiate a controlled slide. This function is activated through the vehicle's touchscreen and is intended for use on closed courses.

=== Seats ===
The front seats are available in several configurations, depending on the model and market. Australian-market EcoBoost and GT models feature leather-accented front seats with six-way power adjustment, heating and ventilation. Optional Recaro sports seats are also available on selected variants and feature more pronounced side bolstering to provide additional support during performance driving. These seats are also offered on the Dark Horse, with distinctive trim and upholstery details. The rear seating arrangement retains the Mustang's 2+2 configuration, with two individual seats. The rear compartment provides more limited passenger space than the front, particularly in terms of legroom and headroom.

== Special models ==
=== Mustang Dark Horse S ===
The Mustang Dark Horse S is a track-only version of the streetcar. It has had all non-essential parts stripped away, and an FIA certified rollcage added, as well as race seats and a racing steering wheel.

=== Mustang GTD ===
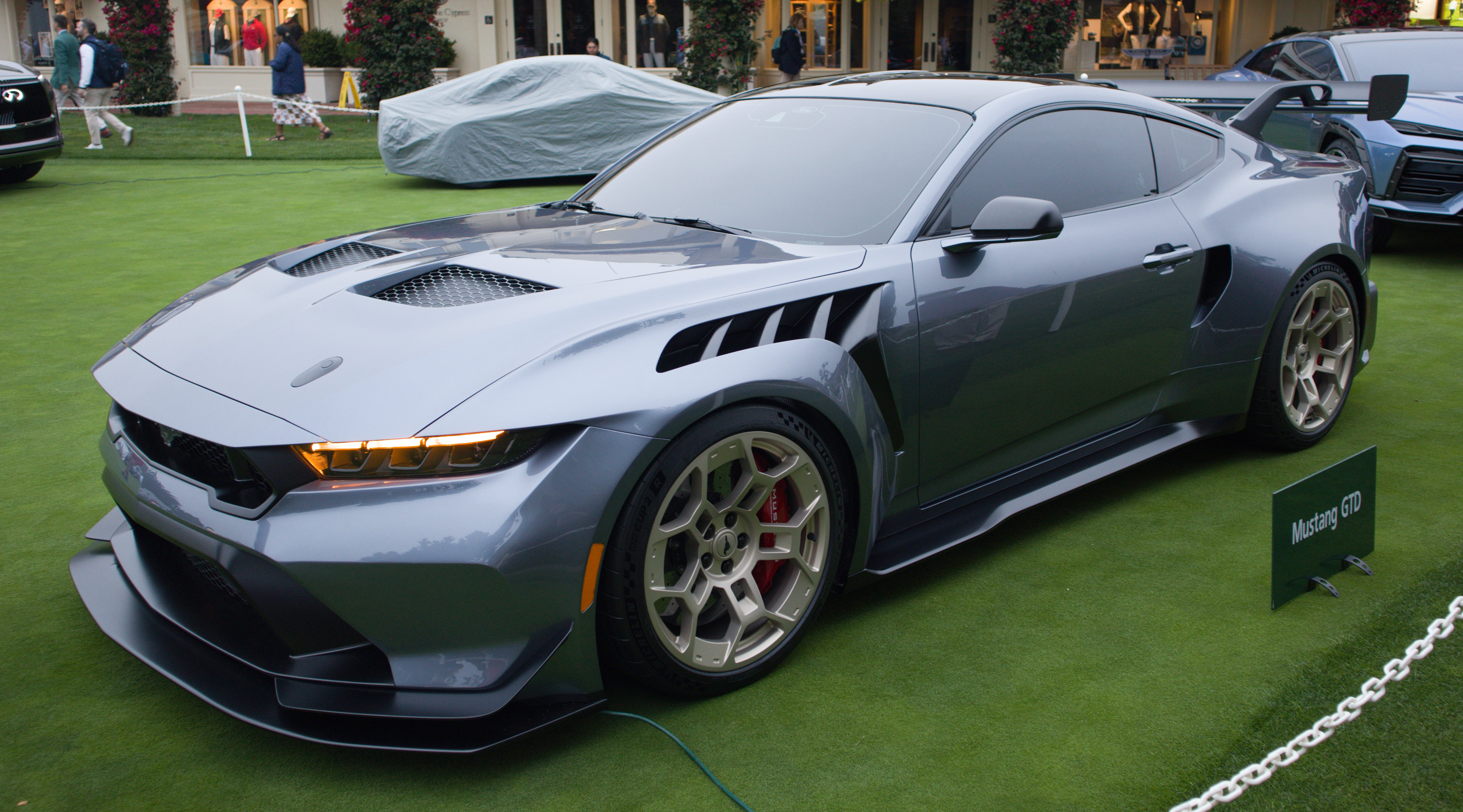
Mustang GTD

On August 17, 2023, Ford unveiled the Mustang GTD, a street-version of their FIA Group GT3 race car, for the 2025 model year. The "GTD" moniker comes from the GTD class, or Grand Touring Daytona class, of GT3 sports cars raced in the IMSA SportsCar Championship. This model incorporates an aerodynamic design and a supercharged 5.2L "Predator" V8 (from the previous generation Shelby GT500) with a rear-mounted transaxle. It makes 815 hp (608 kW) and 664 lb⋅ft (900 N⋅m) of torque, and has a top speed of 202 mph (325 km/h).

Driven by Dirk Müller in December of 2024, The Mustang GTD lapped the Nürburgring track in 6:57:685, making it the only American-made production vehicle, at that time, to complete the circuit in less than seven minutes. It later beat its own record again in May of 2025 with a time of 6:52.072. In July 2025, that record was beaten by a pair of American-made, production-run, 2026 Chevrolet Corvettes; the ZR1 (6:50.763) and ZR1X (6:49.275). The ZR1X time also edged out the current Porsche 911 GT3 RS (992.1) record of 6:49.328. In an Instagram post, Ford CEO Jim Farley congratulated the Corvette team, followed with: "Game on!"

=== Mustang GTD Competition ===
On April 17th, 2026, alongside its Nürburgring Nordschleife Lap Time of 6:40.835, Ford unveiled the GTD Competition, of which spy shots had been taken in October of 2025. The GTD Competition is currently a pre-production model, with the full list of changes not specified. Known details include magnesium wheels, and unspecified horsepower increase, more aerodynamic devices, including dive planes, wheel aero-discs, and a modified wing, and unspecified tires.

=== Mustang Dark Horse SC ===
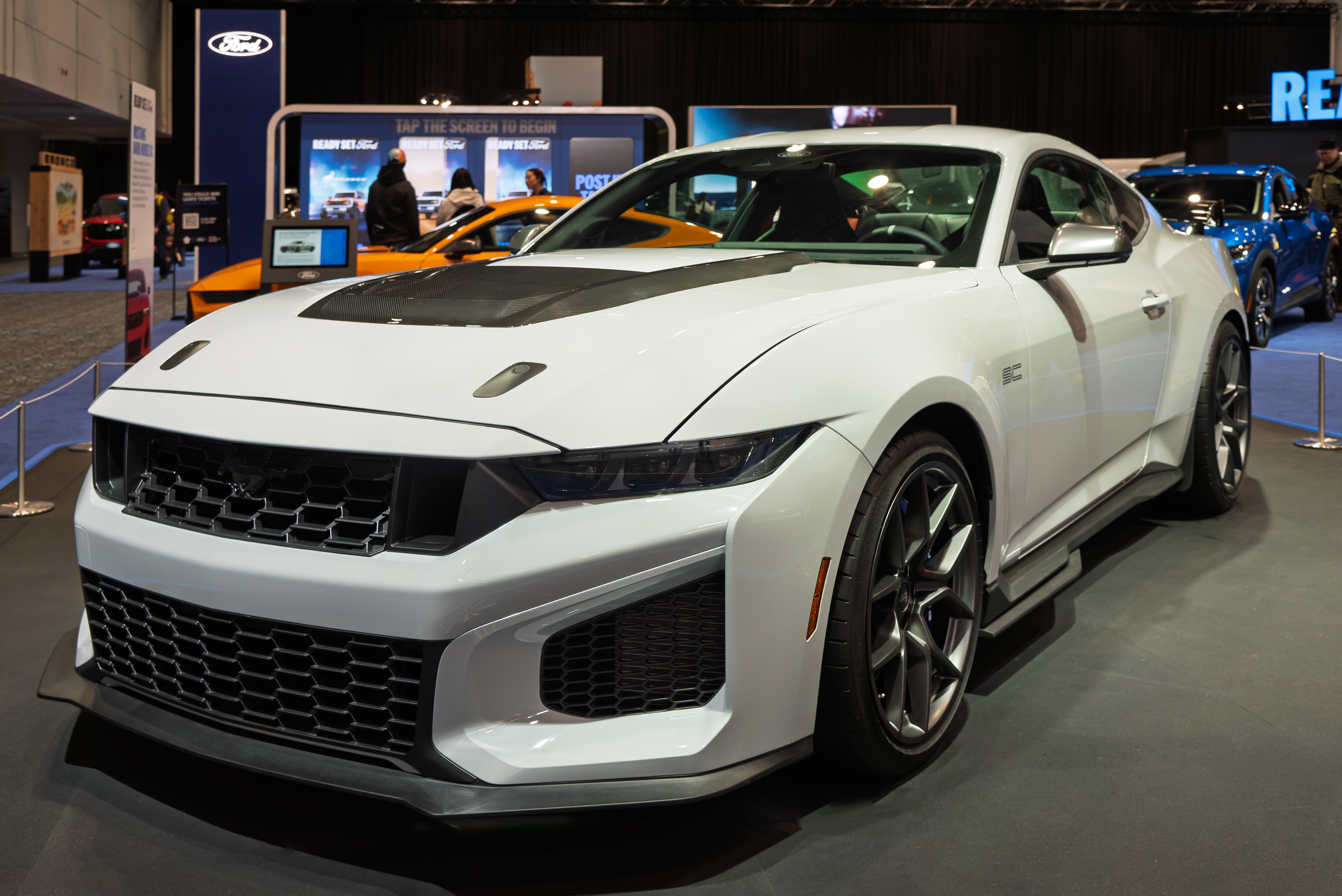
Mustang Dark Horse SC at the 2026 Canadian International AutoShow

On January 15, 2026, Ford unveiled the Mustang Dark Horse SC. It considers it to be the spiritual successor to the sixth generation Shelby GT500. It includes the 5.2L Predator V8, the same engine that powers the GT500 and GTD, which is supercharged (hence the letters "SC"), and it has 795 hp (593 kW) and 660 lb⋅ft (895 N⋅m) of torque. It is a track-focused variant of the Dark Horse. Ford revealed a convertible variant of the Dark Horse SC during the Woodward Dream Cruise on August 15, 2026, by lowering the vehicle from a crane during the event.

=== Mustang Dark Horse T8-Spec Pack ===
In April 2026 Ford announced the Mustang Dark Horse T8-Spec Pack for Australia, limited to 250 units alongside an announcement for the regular Dark Horse returning with 500 units in the fourth quarter of 2026, made in a partnership between Ford Australia and Triple Eight Race Engineering. The steering rack, springs and anti-roll bar were improved. It will be modified from a regular Mustang Dark Horse to a T8-Spec Pack at the Broadmeadows Assembly Plant.

== Motorsport ==
=== Mustang GT3 ===
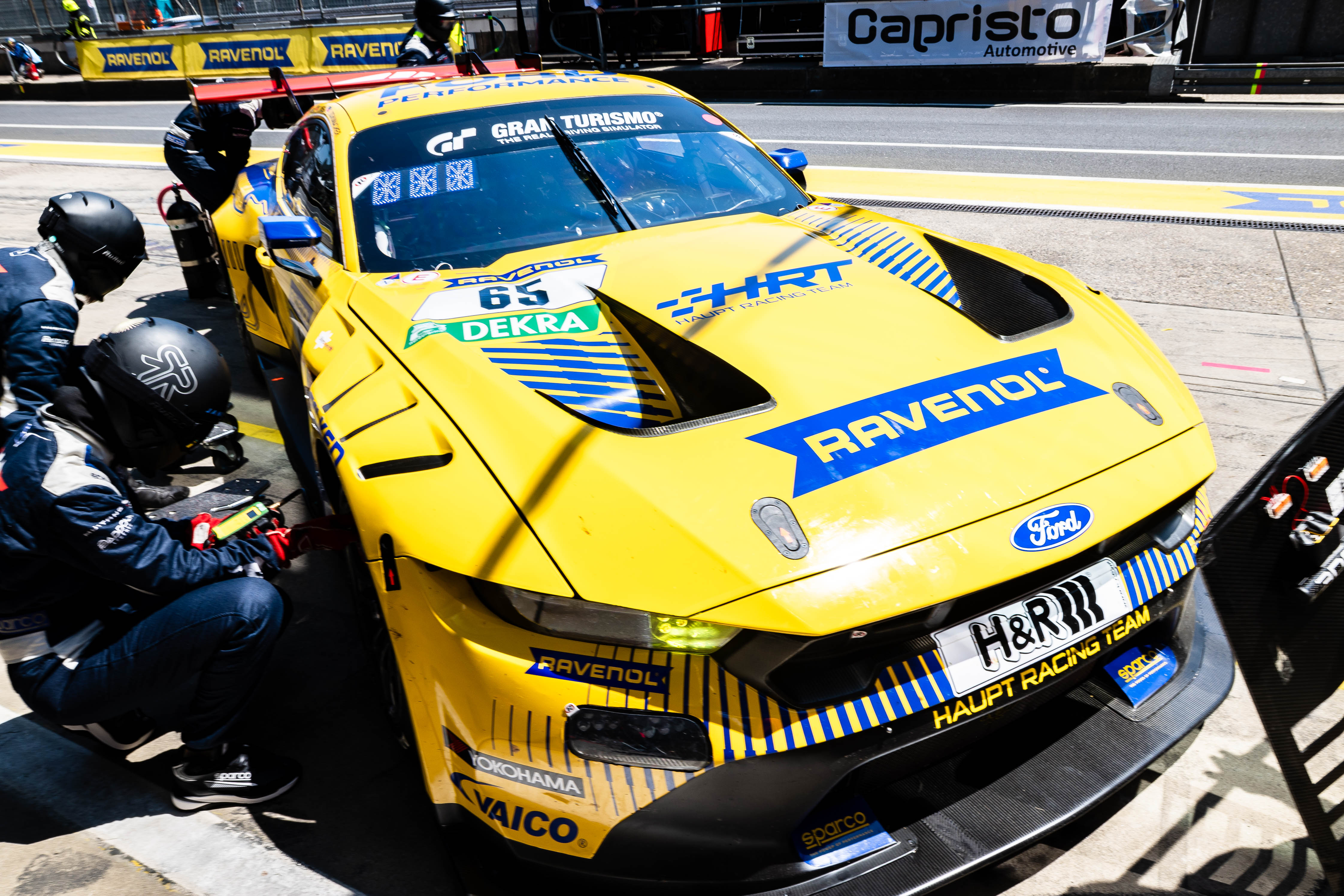
Mustang GT3 run by HRT during a pit stop at the 24 Hours of Nürburgring

In 2022, Ford Performance announced the development of a GT3 Ford Mustang based on the Dark Horse model, built by Ford and Multimatic. It was revealed in 2023 and races in the IMSA SportsCar Championship and FIA WEC. This means the Mustang raced at Le Mans for the first time since 1997 after a 27 year absence. German Racing Team Proton Competition was the first customer team to run the new Mustang GT3 in the WEC. In 2025, the Ford Mustang GT3 made its debut at the ADAC RAVENOL 24h Nürburgring. In addition, HRT team vehicles were competing in the DTM and the ADAC GT Masters.

=== Mustang GT4 ===
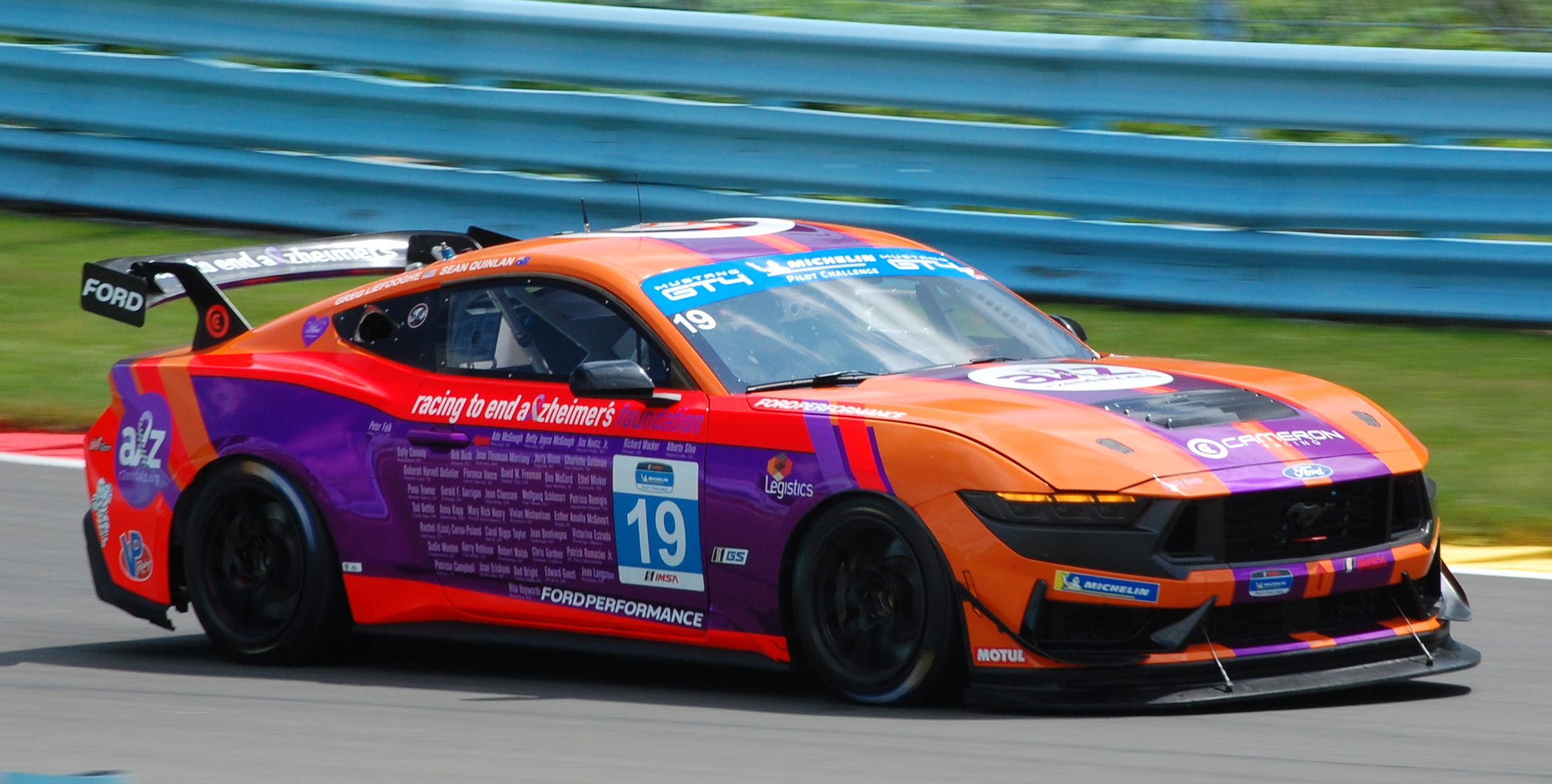
The No. 19 Mustang GT4 of Stephen Cameron Racing during the 2025 LP Building Solutions 120 at Watkins Glen International

In 2023, Ford Performance announced at the 2023 24 Hours of Spa that a new GT4 Ford Mustang would be released for 2024, replacing the previous generation Mustang GT4. Built by Multimatic Motorsports in partnership with Ford, the GT4 retains the 5.0 L Coyote engine found in the road version. It utilizes Brembo brake discs and calipers, Multimatic two-way adjustable DSSV dampers and a unique rear lower control arm configured for coil-over springs.

The car is eligible to compete in the GT4 America Series, Michelin Pilot Challenge, and IMSA VP Racing SportsCar Challenge among other championships that include GT4 cars. The car made its debut at the 2024 Michelin Pilot Challenge race at Daytona. In its first season, KohR Motorsports and Luca Mars took the GSX Drivers' and Teams' championship in the 2024 IMSA VP Racing SportsCar Challenge.

=== NASCAR ===
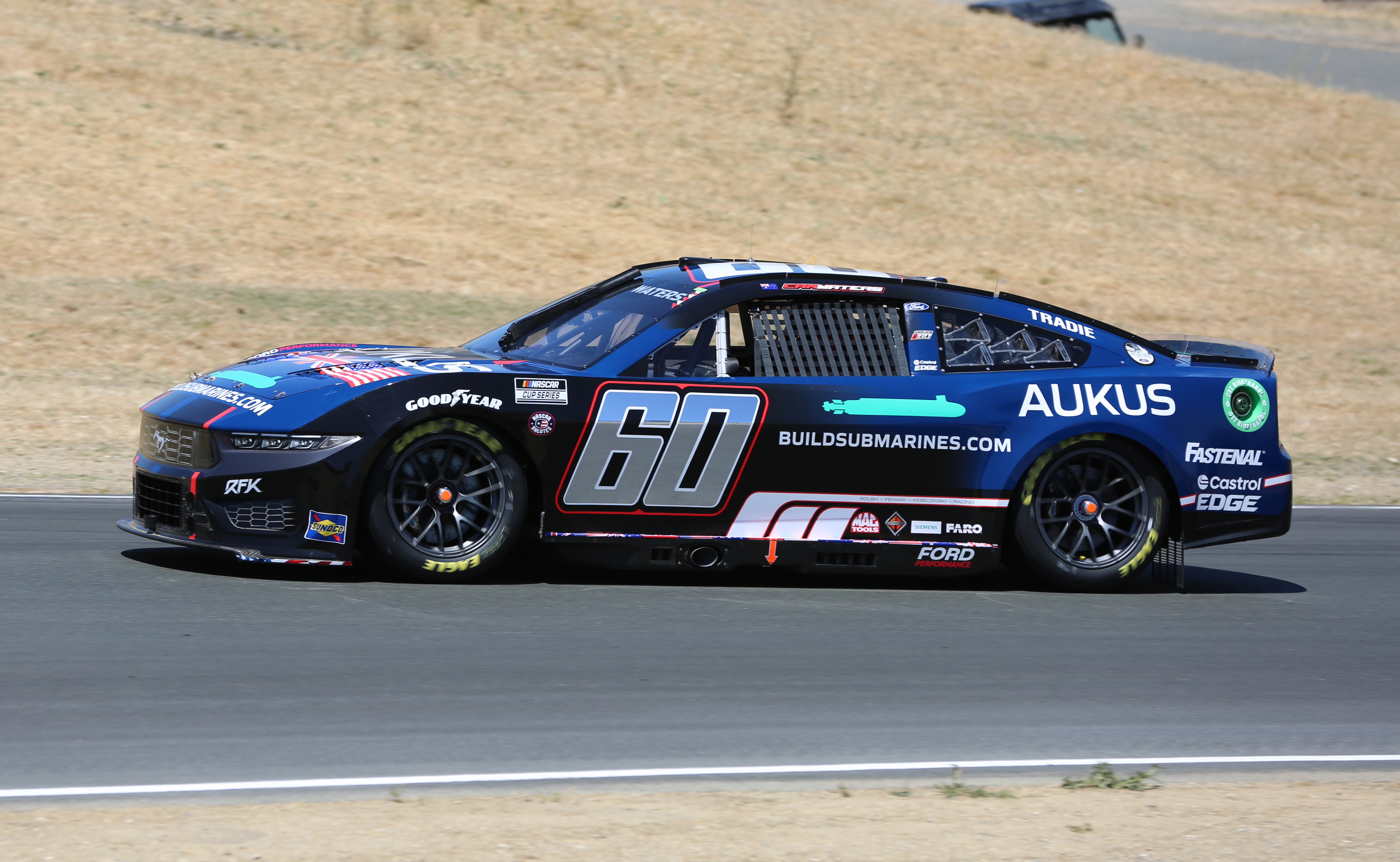
Mustang NASCAR Cup Series at Sonoma Raceway in 2024

On November 1, 2023, Ford Performance unveiled the new Dark Horse Next Gen body style for the 2024 NASCAR Cup Series season, replacing the sixth generation Mustang GT. On November 11, 2026, Ford unveiled the new Mustang body style based on the Dark Horse SC for the 2027 season.

=== Supercars Championship ===
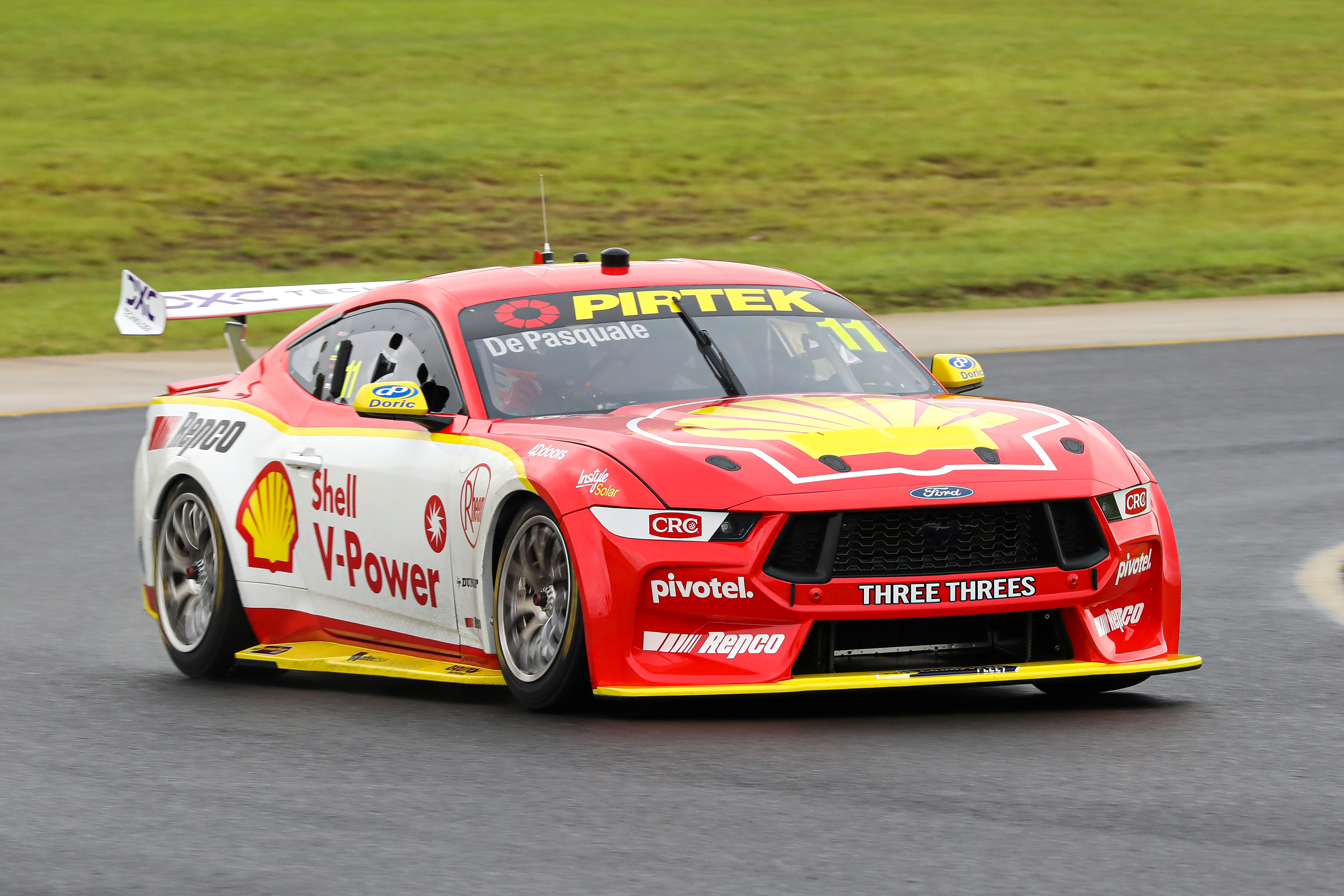
Mustang Supercar during pre-season test at Sydney Motorsport Park in 2023

At the 2022 Bathurst 1000, Ford revealed the Ford Mustang GT Supercar, which was initially built by Ford and Dick Johnson Racing, to conform to the Gen3 regulations.

=== Dark Horse R ===
In July 2023, Ford unveiled the Dark Horse R, a track-only car very similar to the Dark Horse S, but made for the single-make IMSA Ford Mustang Challenge which supports the IMSA SportsCar Championship in 2024.

== Use as police vehicle ==
After the discontinuation of sports cars and sedans from Ford, GM, and Dodge which were often outfitted as police cruisers, the seventh generation Mustang found renewed interest from police departments across the United States. Ford sells the Mustang to government purchasers but it does not currently offer a factory police package, so departments upgrade the vehicles in house. State police agencies in Georgia, Idaho, North Carolina, South Carolina, Tennessee, and Virginia have added the seventh generation Mustang to their fleets.

== Issues and criticism ==
Media reviews considered the interior materials to be less premium than expected for its price, while the limited rear-seat space was also noted as a weakness.

The vehicle was characterised by some reviewers as an incremental development of previous models rather than a substantially new generation, with criticism also directed at the automatic transmission for its excessive number of ratios.

The adoption of screen-based controls attracted criticism regarding usability, with climate-control functions located in a narrow section of the touchscreen using relatively small icons and sliders. Reviewers also noted that the system could take several seconds to become responsive after startup, potentially delaying adjustments to the temperature or fan speed.

The vehicle is not equipped with a spare tire, instead providing a repair kit for minor punctures—this was noted as a limitation in the event of substantial tire damage, particularly when travelling in remote areas.
