= 2018 Porsche GT3 Cup Challenge Australia =

Motor racing competition

The 2018 Porsche Michelin GT3 Cup Challenge Australia Series was an Australian motor racing competition for Porsche 911 GT3 Cup cars. It was the eleventh running of the Porsche GT3 Cup Challenge Australia. The series commenced at The Bend Motorsport Park on 13 April and concluded at Sydney Motorsport Park on 22 September. 2017 series winner Jordan Love opted not to defend his title, instead concentrating his efforts on the 2018 Porsche Carrera Cup Australia.

The series was won by Simon Fallon. with Daniel Stutterd and Christian Pancione winning the Pro-Am and B classes respectively.

== Team and drivers ==
Team	No.	Driver	Class	Rounds
Dan Day Racing	2	(Australia) Dan Day	P	1, 4–6
McElrea Racing	7	(Australia) Jimmy Vernon	P	All
McElrea Racing	9	(Australia) Tony Martin	B	3–6
McElrea Racing	73	(Australia) Michael Hovey	PA	All
McElrea Racing	84	(Australia) Brent Boulton	PA	All
Hallmarc Racing	10	(Australia) Michael Loccisano	PA	1–3, 5–6
The Bend / htfu	13	(Australia) Sam Shahin	PA	1, 6
Cure FA	13	(Australia) Jonathan Gliksten	PA	5
United Petroleum / Pie Face	15	(Australia) Vince Misuraca	B	3
360 Motorsport	17	(Australia) Marcel Zalloua	PA	1, 3, 5–6
360 Motorsport	117	(Australia) Sergio Pires	B	3, 5–6
Melbourne Orthopaedic Group	21	(Australia) Shane Barwood	PA	1–4, 6
Woodford Trailers	22	(Australia) Andrew Goldie	B	1, 3–6
Taplin Real Estate	26	(Australia) Tom Taplin	B	1–4
Taplin Real Estate	26	(Australia) Tom Taplin	P	5–6
CIP Racing	29	(Australia) Rob Woods	PA	1–3
Ashley Seward Motorsport	23	(Australia) Daniel Stutterd	PA	All
Ashley Seward Motorsport	27	(New Zealand) Sam Fillmore	PA	2–6
Ashley Seward Motorsport	36	(Australia) Cooper Murray	P	All
Ashley Seward Motorsport	76	(Australia) Christian Pancione	B	All
Ashley Seward Motorsport	99	(Australia) Ross McGregor	PA	All
Wall Racing	38	(Australia) Chelsea Angelo	P	All
Wall Racing	50	(Australia) Adrian Lengkeek	B	1
Okey Dokey	57	(Australia) Richard Bloomfield	B	1–3, 5–6
DNA Racing	65	(Australia) Ben Stack	PA	1–3
Sonic Motor Racing Services	77	(Australia) Max Vidau	P	All
Sonic Motor Racing Services	96	(Australia) Simon Fallon	P	All
Sonic Motor Racing Services	131	(Australia) Graham Williams	PA	1, 3–4, 6
	87	(Australia) David Greig	B	2–4
Morriss Racing Services	88	(Australia) Phil Morriss	B	All
TBC	91	(Australia) Emanuel Palyaris	B	1
Scott Taylor Motorsport	222	(Australia) Scott Taylor	PA	4
23Red Racing	230	(Australia) Luis Leeds	P	All

All A class teams used Porsche 911 GT3 Cup Type 997 (MY2010-2012) all B class team used Porsche 911 GT3 Cup Type 997 (MY2006-2009). They all used Pirelli Tyres.

== Race calendar ==
The series was contested over six rounds.

Rnd		Circuit	Date	Pole position	Fastest lap	Winning driver	Winning team	Pro-am winner	Class-B winner
1	R1	The Bend Motorsport Park (Tailem Bend, South Australia)	13–15 April	(Australia) Simon Fallon	(Australia) Cooper Murray	(Australia) Cooper Murray	Ashley Seward Motorsport	(Australia) Daniel Stutterd	(Australia) Richard Bloomfield
1	R2	The Bend Motorsport Park (Tailem Bend, South Australia)	13–15 April		(Australia) Max Vidau	(Australia) Max Vidau	Sonic Motor Racing Services	(Australia) Sam Shahin	(Australia) Richard Bloomfield
1	R3	The Bend Motorsport Park (Tailem Bend, South Australia)	13–15 April		(Australia) Cooper Murray	(Australia) Max Vidau	Sonic Motor Racing Services	(Australia) Daniel Stutterd	(Australia) Christian Pancione
2	R1	(Victoria (state)) Sandown Raceway (Melbourne, Victoria)	11–13 May	(Australia) Cooper Murray	(Australia) Luis Leeds	(Australia) Simon Fallon	Sonic Motor Racing Services	(Australia) Daniel Stutterd	(Australia) Christian Pancione
2	R2	(Victoria (state)) Sandown Raceway (Melbourne, Victoria)	11–13 May		(Australia) Simon Fallon	(Australia) Simon Fallon	Sonic Motor Racing Services	(Australia) Brett Boulton	(Australia) David Greig
2	R3	(Victoria (state)) Sandown Raceway (Melbourne, Victoria)	11–13 May		(Australia) Max Vidau	(Australia) Cooper Murray	Ashley Seward Motorsport	(Australia) Daniel Stutterd	(Australia) Christian Pancione
3	R1	(Victoria (state)) Phillip Island Grand Prix Circuit (Phillip Island, Victoria)	1–3 June	(Australia) Cooper Murray	(Australia) Cooper Murray	(Australia) Cooper Murray	Ashley Seward Motorsport	(Australia) Marcel Zalloua	(Australia) David Greig
3	R2	(Victoria (state)) Phillip Island Grand Prix Circuit (Phillip Island, Victoria)	1–3 June		(Australia) Cooper Murray	(Australia) Cooper Murray	Ashley Seward Motorsport	(Australia) Daniel Stutterd	(Australia) Christian Pancione
3	R3	(Victoria (state)) Phillip Island Grand Prix Circuit (Phillip Island, Victoria)	1–3 June		(Australia) Max Vidau	(Australia) Cooper Murray	Ashley Seward Motorsport	(Australia) Ben Stack	(Australia) Christian Pancione
4	R1	Queensland Raceway (Ipswich, Queensland)	27–29 July	(Australia) Cooper Murray	(Australia) Max Vidau	(Australia) Cooper Murray	Ashley Seward Motorsport	(Australia) Brett Boulton	(Australia) Christian Pancione
4	R2	Queensland Raceway (Ipswich, Queensland)	27–29 July		(Australia) Cooper Murray	(Australia) Simon Fallon	Sonic Motor Racing Services	(Australia) Brett Boulton	(Australia) Christian Pancione
4	R3	Queensland Raceway (Ipswich, Queensland)	27–29 July		(Australia) Luis Leeds	(Australia) Simon Fallon	Sonic Motor Racing Services	(Australia) Brett Boulton	(Australia) Christian Pancione
5	R1	(Victoria (state)) Winton Motor Raceway (Benalla, Victoria)	1–2 September	(Australia) Cooper Murray	(Australia) Simon Fallon	(Australia) Simon Fallon	Sonic Motor Racing Services	(Australia) Marcel Zalloua	(Australia) Sergio Pires
5	R2	(Victoria (state)) Winton Motor Raceway (Benalla, Victoria)	1–2 September		(Australia) Simon Fallon	(Australia) Cooper Murray	Ashley Seward Motorsport	(Australia) Marcel Zalloua	(Australia) Christian Pancione
5	R3	(Victoria (state)) Winton Motor Raceway (Benalla, Victoria)	1–2 September		(Australia) Cooper Murray	(Australia) Cooper Murray	Ashley Seward Motorsport	(Australia) Daniel Stutterd	(Australia) Christian Pancione
6	R1	Sydney Motorsport Park (Eastern Creek, New South Wales)	21–22 September	(Australia) Cooper Murray	(Australia) Max Vidau	(Australia) Jimmy Vernon	McElrea Racing	(Australia) Brett Boulton	(Australia) Christian Pancione
6	R2	Sydney Motorsport Park (Eastern Creek, New South Wales)	21–22 September		(Australia) Jimmy Vernon	(Australia) Jimmy Vernon	McElrea Racing	(Australia) Brett Boulton	(Australia) Christian Pancione

== Series standings ==
The series was won by Simon Fallon. Fallon also won the Pro class, Danny Stutterd won the Pro-Am class and Christian Pancione won Class B.

== See also ==
- 2018 Porsche Carrera Cup Australia
