= Pieface =

Pieface may refer to:

- Pie Face, an Australian company that sells take-away pies, sandwiches, coffee, soft drinks and other snack products
- Pie Face!, a game by Hasbro
- Pie Face, a friend of British comic character Dennis the Menace
- Thomas Kalmaku, sidekick to DC Comics character Hal Jordan, the superhero Green Lantern
- John McKenzie (ice hockey), professional ice hockey player
- PieFace Records, a fictional record label in British television comedy series The Mighty Boosh
- A slang term for the K-42 Reconnaissance Camera developed by the United States Air Force in the early 1950s
