= 2019 Porsche Carrera Cup Australia =

Automobiles competition

The 2019 Porsche PAYCE Carrera Cup Australia was the fifteenth running of the Porsche Carrera Cup Australia motor racing series. It began on 28 February at Adelaide Street Circuit and concluded on 25 October at Surfers Paradise Street Circuit.

The series was won by Jordan Love.

== Teams and drivers ==
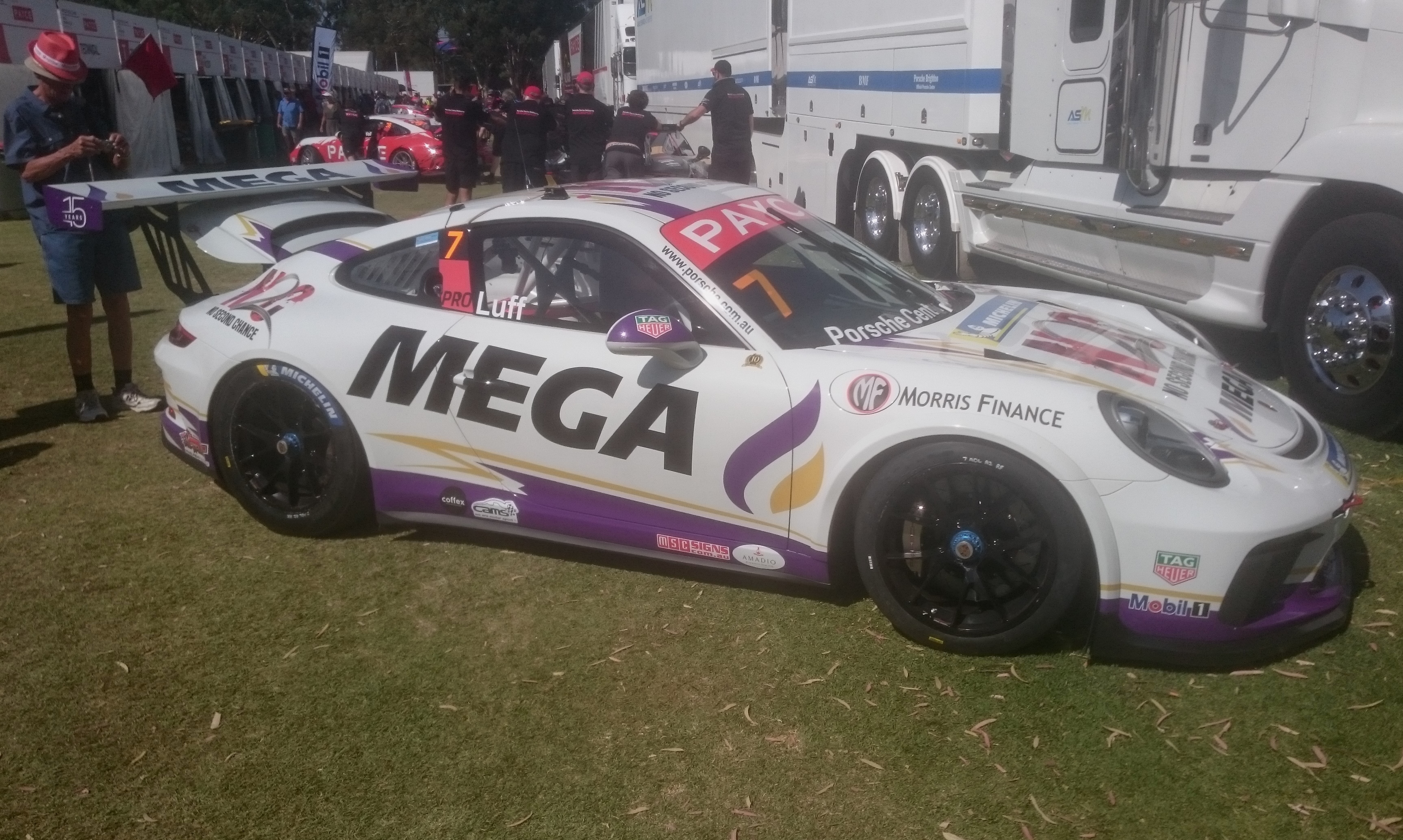
Warren Luff placed eighth in the series

Team	Class	No.	Driver	Rounds
Grove Motorsport	PA	4	(Australia) Stephen Grove	1–3, 6-7
Grove Motorsport	P	10	(Australia) Brenton Grove	6
Sonic Motor Racing Services	P	5	(Australia) Thomas Maxwell	All
Sonic Motor Racing Services	P	77	(Australia) Michael Almond	All
Sonic Motor Racing Services	P	78	(Australia) Aaron Love	8
Sonic Motor Racing Services	P	100	(Australia) Dale Wood	All
Sonic Motor Racing Services	P	777	(Australia) Jordan Love	All
McElrea Racing	PA	6	(New Zealand) Tim Miles	All
McElrea Racing	P	7	(Australia) Warren Luff	1–6
McElrea Racing	P	7	(Australia) Harri Jones	8
McElrea Racing	PA	19	(Australia) Anthony Gilbertson	1–5
McElrea Racing	P	36	(Australia) Cooper Murray	4–8
McElrea Racing	PA	84	(Australia) Brett Boulton	6
Porsche Centre Melbourne	P	8	(Australia) Nick McBride	All
Porsche Centre Melbourne	PA	9	(Australia) Marc Cini	1–2, 7
Porsche Centre Melbourne	PA	9	(Australia) Michael Loccisano	6
Porsche Centre Melbourne	P	10	(Australia) Joey Mawson	2
Steven Richards Motorsport	P	12	(New Zealand) Steven Richards	All
Buik Motorsports	PA	13	(Australia) Sam Shahin	All
Volante Rosso Motorsport	P	15	(Australia) Josh Hunt	1–3
Agas National	PA	20	(Australia) Adrian Flack	All
Ashley Seward Motorsport	PA	22	(Australia) Dean Cook	All
Ashley Seward Motorsport	P	36	(Australia) Cooper Murray	1–3
Ashley Seward Motorsport	PA	80	(Australia) Max Twigg	1
Ashley Seward Motorsport	P	88	(Australia) Dylan O'Keefe	2
Lago Racing	PA	23	(Australia) Roger Lago	All
Wall Racing	PA	27	(Australia) Liam Talbot	All
Wall Racing	P	38	(Australia) David Wall	All
Wall Racing	PA	50	(Australia) David Stevens	1
DRM Motorsport	PA	30	(Australia) David Ryan	2, 6-7
Garth Walden Racing	P	34	(Australia) Duvashen Padayachee	All
Garth Walden Racing	PA	35	(Australia) Indiran Padayachee	1–3, 5–8
Greg Ward	PA	68	(Australia) Greg Ward	8
Cameron Hill Racing	P	111	(Australia) Cameron Hill	All
Scott Taylor Motorsport	PA	222	(Australia) Scott Taylor	4–8

Note: Only Porsche 911 GT3 Cup (Type 991 II) automobiles were eligible to compete in the series.

== Calendar ==
The calendar for the 2019 season was announced on the 21st of October, 2018. The series will return to the Townsville Street Circuit, whilst Sydney Motorsport Park was dropped from the calendar.

Rnd		Circuit	Date	Pole position	Fastest lap	Winning driver	Winning team
1	R1	Adelaide Street Circuit (Adelaide, South Australia)	March 1-3	(Australia) David Wall	(Australia) David Wall	(Australia) Nick McBride	Porsche Centre Melbourne
1	R2	Adelaide Street Circuit (Adelaide, South Australia)	March 1-3		(Australia) David Wall	(Australia) Nick McBride	Porsche Centre Melbourne
1	R3	Adelaide Street Circuit (Adelaide, South Australia)	March 1-3		(Australia) David Wall	(Australia) Nick McBride	Porsche Centre Melbourne
2	R1	(Victoria (state)) Melbourne Grand Prix Circuit (Melbourne, Victoria)	March 14-17	(Australia) Dale Wood	(Australia) Dale Wood	(Australia) Dale Wood	Sonic Motor Racing Services
2	R2	(Victoria (state)) Melbourne Grand Prix Circuit (Melbourne, Victoria)	March 14-17		(Australia) Dale Wood	(Australia) Dale Wood	Sonic Motor Racing Services
2	R3	(Victoria (state)) Melbourne Grand Prix Circuit (Melbourne, Victoria)	March 14-17		(Australia) Cooper Murray	(Australia) Jordan Love	Sonic Motor Racing Services
2	R4	(Victoria (state)) Melbourne Grand Prix Circuit (Melbourne, Victoria)	March 14-17		(Australia) Jordan Love	(Australia) Jordan Love	Sonic Motor Racing Services
3	R1	(Victoria (state)) Phillip Island Grand Prix Circuit (Phillip Island, Victoria)	April 12-14	(Australia) Jordan Love	(Australia) Jordan Love	(Australia) Jordan Love	Sonic Motor Racing Services
3	R2	(Victoria (state)) Phillip Island Grand Prix Circuit (Phillip Island, Victoria)	April 12-14		(Australia) Michael Almond	(Australia) Jordan Love	Sonic Motor Racing Services
3	R3	(Victoria (state)) Phillip Island Grand Prix Circuit (Phillip Island, Victoria)	April 12-14		(Australia) David Wall	(Australia) Jordan Love	Sonic Motor Racing Services
4	R1	Hidden Valley Raceway (Darwin, Northern Territory)	June 14-16	(Australia) Cameron Hill	(Australia) Jordan Love	(Australia) Cameron Hill	Cameron Hill Racing
4	R2	Hidden Valley Raceway (Darwin, Northern Territory)	June 14-16		(Australia) Cooper Murray	(Australia) Dale Wood	Sonic Motor Racing Services
4	R3	Hidden Valley Raceway (Darwin, Northern Territory)	June 14-16		(Australia) Dale Wood	(Australia) Michael Almond	Sonic Motor Racing Services
5	R1	Townsville Street Circuit (Townsville, Queensland)	July 5-7	(Australia) Roger Lago	(Australia) Cooper Murray	(Australia) Cooper Murray	McElrea Racing
5	R2	Townsville Street Circuit (Townsville, Queensland)	July 5-7		(Australia) Cooper Murray	(Australia) Cooper Murray	McElrea Racing
5	R3	Townsville Street Circuit (Townsville, Queensland)	July 5-7		(Australia) Dale Wood	(Australia) Cooper Murray	McElrea Racing
6	R1	The Bend Motorsport Park (Tailem Bend, South Australia)	August 23-25	(Australia) Jordan Love	(Australia) Jordan Love	(Australia) Jordan Love	Sonic Motor Racing Services
6	R2	The Bend Motorsport Park (Tailem Bend, South Australia)	August 23-25		(Australia) Jordan Love	(Australia) Jordan Love	Sonic Motor Racing Services
6	R3	The Bend Motorsport Park (Tailem Bend, South Australia)	August 23-25		(Australia) Jordan Love	(Australia) Jordan Love	Sonic Motor Racing Services
7	R1	Mount Panorama Circuit (Bathurst, New South Wales)	October 10-13	(Australia) David Wall	(Australia) David Wall	(Australia) Jordan Love	Sonic Motor Racing Services
7	R2	Mount Panorama Circuit (Bathurst, New South Wales)	October 10-13		(Australia) Jordan Love	(Australia) Jordan Love	Sonic Motor Racing Services
7	R3	Mount Panorama Circuit (Bathurst, New South Wales)	October 10-13		(Australia) Cooper Murray	(Australia) Jordan Love	Sonic Motor Racing Services
8	R1	Surfers Paradise Street Circuit (Surfers Paradise, Queensland)	October 25-27	(Australia) David Wall	(Australia) Cooper Murray	(Australia) David Wall	Wall Racing
8	R2	Surfers Paradise Street Circuit (Surfers Paradise, Queensland)	October 25-27		(Australia) Nick McBride	(Australia) David Wall	Wall Racing
8	R3	Surfers Paradise Street Circuit (Surfers Paradise, Queensland)	October 25-27		(Australia) Cooper Murray	(Australia) David Wall	Wall Racing

== Series standings ==
The series was won by Jordan Love.
