= 2023 Bathurst 1000 =

Motor race in Australia

(New South Wales) 2023 Repco Bathurst 1000
Event Information
- Round 10 of 12 in the 2023 Supercars Championship
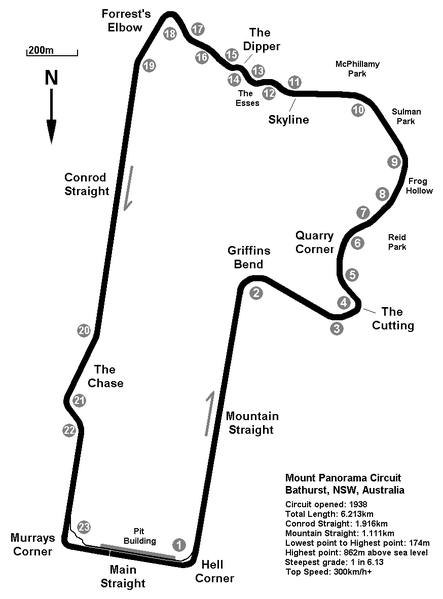
- Layout of the Mount Panorama Circuit
- Date: October 5–8 2023
- Location: Bathurst, New South Wales
- Venue: Mount Panorama Circuit

Results
Race 1
Distance	161 laps	1000 km
Pole position	2:04.2719; Erebus Motorsport	(Australia) Brodie Kostecki
Winner	(New Zealand) Shane van Gisbergen (New Zealand) Richie Stanaway; Triple Eight Race Engineering	6:07:07.4957

The 2023 Bathurst 1000 (known as the 2023 Repco Bathurst 1000 for commercial reasons) was a motor racing event for Supercars held on the week of 5 to 8 October 2023. It hosted the tenth round of the 2023 Supercars Championship and took place at the Mount Panorama Circuit in Bathurst, New South Wales, Australia, featuring a single race of 1000 kilometres.

New Zealanders Shane van Gisbergen and Richie Stanaway claimed victory for Triple Eight Race Engineering, the teams' tenth Bathurst 1000 win. It was Van Gisbergen's third victory in four years, and the first win for Stanaway. The duo were only the second all-Kiwi crew to win the race after Greg Murphy and Steven Richards in 1999, and their 19.9-second margin of victory was the largest since the same race. The race was also won by a Chevrolet for the first time, with sixth-generation Camaros finishing first and second against a backdrop of participant and public discontent related to technical parity between the Camaros and rival Ford Mustangs.

== Report ==
=== Background ===
Event history

The event was the 66th running of the Bathurst 1000, which was first held at the Phillip Island Grand Prix Circuit in 1960 as a 500-mile race for Australian-made standard production sedans, and marked the 63rd time that the race was held at Mount Panorama. It was the 27th running of the "Australia 1000" race, which was first held after the organisational split between the Australian Racing Drivers Club and V8 Supercars Australia that saw two "Bathurst 1000" races contested in both 1997 and 1998. The event also celebrated the 60th anniversary of the first running of the Armstrong 500 at Mount Panorama, with promotional material reflecting this milestone.

Chevrolet returned to the event for the first time since 1984, while also marking the first time in the event's history that Holden did not take part.

Shane van Gisbergen and Garth Tander entered the event as defending race winners, but did not compete together. Van Gisbergen remained with Triple Eight Race Engineering, while Tander moved to Grove Racing.

Parity concerns

This was the first Bathurst 1000 held under Supercars Championships' "Gen3" regulations, which were centred around American pony cars (namely the sixth-generation Chevrolet Camaro and the S650-model Ford Mustang) following the demise of Holden. Throughout the 2023 season, Ford Performance and Ford teams expressed concerns over a lack of technical parity between the two models – exacerbated by Mustangs winning only two of the preceding 23 races (one of which through the disqualification of two Camaros).

Supercars opened an inquest into parity following the Darwin round, resulting in a revised rear aero package for the Mustang ahead of the Townsville 500. Prior to the Bathurst 1000, Ford and its teams pushed for further alterations to the Mustang's aero package. A meeting between Supercars officials and teams was mooted, and later cancelled in favour of intra-manufacturer meetings. As a result of pushback from Chevrolet teams and a pre-determined parity "trigger" having not been met, Ford's proposals were rejected by Supercars.

=== Entry list ===
Twenty-eight cars entered the event - 15 Chevrolet Camaros and 13 Ford Mustangs. In addition to the twenty-five regular-season entries, three "wildcard" entrants joined the field – one from Blanchard Racing Team, one from Dick Johnson Racing, and one from Triple Eight Race Engineering.

Three drivers made their Bathurst 1000 debut; FIA World Endurance Championship driver Kévin Estre, and Super2 Series drivers Kai Allen and Aaron Love. Estre and the returning Simona de Silvestro were the first drivers from outside of Australia and New Zealand to participate in the event since De Silvestro, James Hinchcliffe, Alexandre Prémat and Alexander Rossi in 2019.

No.	Drivers	Team (Sponsors)	Car	No.	Drivers	Team (Sponsors)	Car
2	(Australia) Nick Percat (New Zealand) Fabian Coulthard	Walkinshaw Andretti United (Mobil 1, NTI Insurance)	Ford Mustang S650	23	(Australia) Tim Slade (Australia) Jonathon Webb	PremiAir Racing (Movember)	Chevrolet Camaro Mk.6
3	(Australia) Todd Hazelwood (Australia) Tim Blanchard	Blanchard Racing Team (CoolDrive)	Ford Mustang S650	25	(Australia) Chaz Mostert (Australia) Lee Holdsworth	Walkinshaw Andretti United (Mobil 1, Optus)	Ford Mustang S650
4	(Australia) Jack Smith (New Zealand) Jaxon Evans	Brad Jones Racing (SCT Logistics)	Chevrolet Camaro Mk.6	26	(Australia) David Reynolds (Australia) Garth Tander	Grove Racing (Penrite)	Ford Mustang S650
5	(Australia) James Courtney (Australia) Zak Best	Tickford Racing (Snowy River Caravans)	Ford Mustang S650	31	(Australia) James Golding (Australia) Dylan O'Keeffe	PremiAir Racing (Nulon)	Chevrolet Camaro Mk.6
6	(Australia) Cam Waters (Australia) James Moffat	Tickford Racing (Monster Energy)	Ford Mustang S650	34	(Australia) Jack Le Brocq (Australia) Jayden Ojeda	Matt Stone Racing (Truck Assist)	Chevrolet Camaro Mk.6
7	(Australia) Jake Kostecki (Australia) Aaron Love	Blanchard Racing Team (Petronas Syntium)	Ford Mustang S650	35	(Australia) Cameron Hill (Australia) Jaylyn Robotham	Matt Stone Racing (Truck Assist)	Chevrolet Camaro Mk.6
8	(New Zealand) Andre Heimgartner (Australia) Dale Wood	Brad Jones Racing (R&J Batteries)	Chevrolet Camaro Mk.6	55	(Australia) Thomas Randle (Australia) Garry Jacobson	Tickford Racing (Castrol, BP)	Ford Mustang S650
9	(Australia) Will Brown (Australia) Jack Perkins	Erebus Motorsport (Coca-Cola)	Chevrolet Camaro Mk.6	56	(Australia) Declan Fraser (Australia) Tyler Everingham	Tickford Racing (Tradie Beer)	Ford Mustang S650
11	(Australia) Anton de Pasquale (Australia) Tony D'Alberto	Dick Johnson Racing (Shell V-Power)	Ford Mustang S650	88	(Australia) Broc Feeney (Australia) Jamie Whincup	Triple Eight Race Engineering (Red Bull, Ampol)	Chevrolet Camaro Mk.6
14	(Australia) Bryce Fullwood (Australia) Dean Fiore	Brad Jones Racing (Middy's Electrical)	Chevrolet Camaro Mk.6	96	(Australia) Macauley Jones (Australia) Jordan Boys	Brad Jones Racing (Pizza Hut)	Chevrolet Camaro Mk.6
17	(Australia) Will Davison (Australia) Alex Davison	Dick Johnson Racing (Shell V-Power)	Ford Mustang S650	97	(New Zealand) Shane van Gisbergen (New Zealand) Richie Stanaway	Triple Eight Race Engineering (Red Bull, Ampol)	Chevrolet Camaro Mk.6
18	(Australia) Mark Winterbottom (Australia) Michael Caruso	Team 18 (DeWalt)	Chevrolet Camaro Mk.6	98	(Australia) Kai Allen (Switzerland) Simona de Silvestro	Dick Johnson Racing (Shell V-Power)	Ford Mustang S650
19	(New Zealand) Matthew Payne (France) Kévin Estre	Grove Racing (Penrite)	Ford Mustang S650	99	(Australia) Brodie Kostecki (Australia) David Russell	Erebus Motorsport (Coca-Cola)	Chevrolet Camaro Mk.6
20	(Australia) Scott Pye (Australia) Warren Luff	Team 18 (Toyota Forklifts)	Chevrolet Camaro Mk.6	888	(Australia) Zane Goddard (Australia) Craig Lowndes	Triple Eight Race Engineering (Supercheap Auto)	Chevrolet Camaro Mk.6

== Results ==
=== Practice ===
Session	Day	Fastest Lap						
Session	Day	No.	Driver	Team	Car	Time	Cond	Ref
Practice 1	Thursday	9	(Australia) Will Brown	Erebus Motorsport	Chevrolet Camaro Mk.6	2:05.9653	Fine	
Practice 2 (Co-Driver)	Thursday	99	(Australia) David Russell	Erebus Motorsport	Chevrolet Camaro Mk.6	2:05.6826	Fine	
Practice 3	Friday	19	(New Zealand) Matthew Payne	Grove Racing	Ford Mustang S650	2:05.2855	Cloudy	
Practice 4	Friday	99	(Australia) Brodie Kostecki	Erebus Motorsport	Chevrolet Camaro Mk.6	2:05.1215	Overcast	
Practice 5 (Co-Driver)	Saturday	97	(New Zealand) Richie Stanaway	Triple Eight Race Engineering	Chevrolet Camaro Mk.6	2:06.0486	Cloudy	
Practice 6	Saturday	88	(Australia) Broc Feeney	Triple Eight Race Engineering	Chevrolet Camaro Mk.6	2:05.5872	Cloudy	
Warm Up	Sunday	99	(Australia) Brodie Kostecki	Erebus Motorsport	Chevrolet Camaro Mk.6	2:06.3584	Fine	

=== Qualifying ===
Pos	No.	Driver	Team	Car	Time	Gap	Grid
1	99	(Australia) Brodie Kostecki	Erebus Motorsport	Chevrolet Camaro Mk.6	2:04.6644		Top 10
2	31	(Australia) James Golding	PremiAir Racing	Chevrolet Camaro Mk.6	2:04.8133	+0.1489	Top 10
3	11	(Australia) Anton de Pasquale	Dick Johnson Racing	Ford Mustang S650	2:04.9667	+0.3023	Top 10
4	6	(Australia) Cam Waters	Tickford Racing	Ford Mustang S650	2:04.9909	+0.3265	Top 10
5	88	(Australia) Broc Feeney	Triple Eight Race Engineering	Chevrolet Camaro Mk.6	2:05.0524	+0.3880	Top 10
6	26	(Australia) David Reynolds	Grove Racing	Ford Mustang S650	2:05.0830	+0.4186	Top 10
7	97	(New Zealand) Shane van Gisbergen	Triple Eight Race Engineering	Chevrolet Camaro Mk.6	2:05.1823	+0.5179	Top 10
8	19	(New Zealand) Matthew Payne	Grove Racing	Ford Mustang S650	2:05.2090	+0.5446	Top 10
9	25	(Australia) Chaz Mostert	Walkinshaw Andretti United	Ford Mustang S650	2:05.2177	+0.5533	Top 10
10	17	(Australia) Will Davison	Dick Johnson Racing	Ford Mustang S650	2:05.2851	+0.6207	Top 10
11	55	(Australia) Thomas Randle	Tickford Racing	Ford Mustang S650	2:05.3799	+0.7177	11
12	20	(Australia) Scott Pye	Charlie Schwerkolt Racing	Chevrolet Camaro Mk.6	2:05.4419	+0.7775	12
13	8	(New Zealand) Andre Heimgartner	Brad Jones Racing	Chevrolet Camaro Mk.6	2:05.4700	+0.8056	13
14	35	(Australia) Cameron Hill	Matt Stone Racing	Chevrolet Camaro Mk.6	2:05.4895	+0.8251	14
15	34	(Australia) Jack Le Brocq	Matt Stone Racing	Chevrolet Camaro Mk.6	2:05.5074	+0.8430	15
16	5	(Australia) James Courtney	Tickford Racing	Ford Mustang S650	2:05.5107	+0.8463	16
17	9	(Australia) Will Brown	Erebus Motorsport	Chevrolet Camaro Mk.6	2:05.5581	+0.8937	17
18	23	(Australia) Tim Slade	PremiAir Racing	Chevrolet Camaro Mk.6	2:05.5844	+0.9200	18
19	18	(Australia) Mark Winterbottom	Charlie Schwerkolt Racing	Chevrolet Camaro Mk.6	2:05.7995	+1.1351	19
20	888	(Australia) Zane Goddard	Triple Eight Race Engineering	Chevrolet Camaro Mk.6	2:05.8511	+1.1867	20
21	14	(Australia) Bryce Fullwood	Brad Jones Racing	Chevrolet Camaro Mk.6	2:05.9406	+1.2762	21
22	3	(Australia) Todd Hazelwood	Blanchard Racing Team	Ford Mustang S650	2:05.9547	+1.2903	22
23	2	(Australia) Nick Percat	Walkinshaw Andretti United	Ford Mustang S650	2:06.0197	+1.3553	23
24	96	(Australia) Macauley Jones	Brad Jones Racing	Chevrolet Camaro Mk.6	2:06.2170	+1.5526	24
25	98	(Australia) Kai Allen	Dick Johnson Racing	Ford Mustang S650	2:06.2417	+1.5773	25
26	7	(Australia) Aaron Love	Blanchard Racing Team	Ford Mustang S650	2:06.5312	+1.8668	26
27	4	(Australia) Jack Smith	Brad Jones Racing	Chevrolet Camaro Mk.6	2:07.1711	+2.5067	27
28	56	(Australia) Declan Fraser	Tickford Racing	Ford Mustang S650	No time		28

=== Top 10 Shootout ===
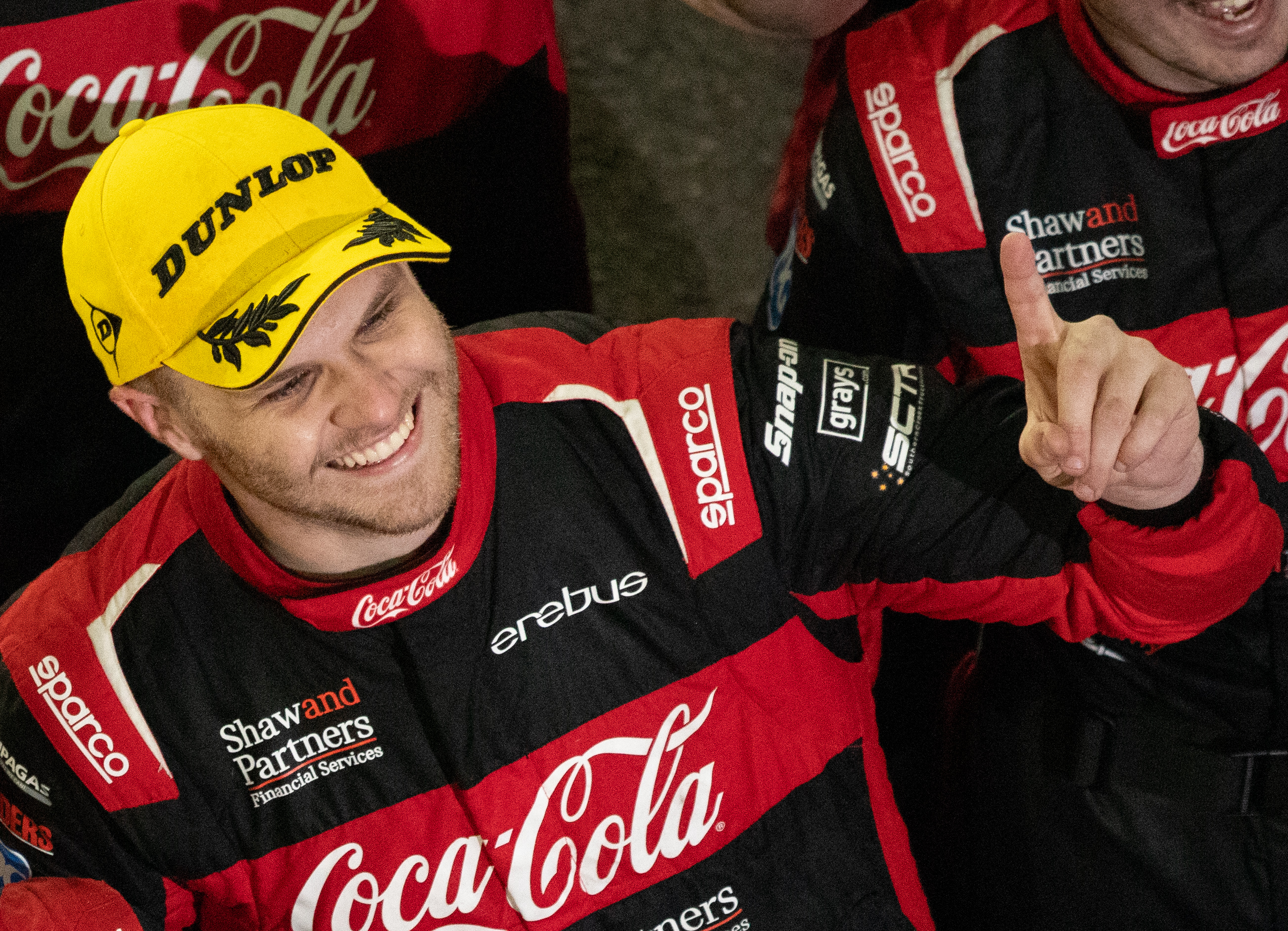
Brodie Kostecki scored pole position for Erebus Motorsport and Chevrolet.

Pos	No.	Driver	Team	Car	Time	Gap
1	99	(Australia) Brodie Kostecki	Erebus Motorsport	Chevrolet Camaro Mk.6	2:04.2719	
2	88	(Australia) Broc Feeney	Triple Eight Race Engineering	Chevrolet Camaro Mk.6	2:04.7549	+0.4830
3	6	(Australia) Cam Waters	Tickford Racing	Ford Mustang S650	2:04.7775	+0.5056
4	31	(Australia) James Golding	PremiAir Racing	Chevrolet Camaro Mk.6	2:04.8155	+0.5436
5	11	(Australia) Anton de Pasquale	Dick Johnson Racing	Ford Mustang S650	2:04.9156	+0.6437
6	97	(New Zealand) Shane van Gisbergen	Triple Eight Race Engineering	Chevrolet Camaro Mk.6	2:04.9971	+0.7252
7	26	(Australia) David Reynolds	Grove Racing	Ford Mustang S650	2:05.1512	+0.8793
8	19	(New Zealand) Matthew Payne	Grove Racing	Ford Mustang S650	2:05.2696	+0.9977
9	25	(Australia) Chaz Mostert	Walkinshaw Andretti United	Ford Mustang S650	2:05.8309	+1.5590
10	17	(Australia) Will Davison	Dick Johnson Racing	Ford Mustang S650	2:06.4174	+2.1455

=== Grid ===
Inside row			Outside row		
1	(Australia) Brodie Kostecki (Australia) David Russell	99	88	(Australia) Broc Feeney (Australia) Jamie Whincup	2
1	Erebus Motorsport (Chevrolet Camaro Mk.6)		Triple Eight Race Engineering (Chevrolet Camaro Mk.6)		2
3	(Australia) Cam Waters (Australia) James Moffat	6	31	(Australia) James Golding (Australia) Dylan O'Keeffe	4
3	Tickford Racing (Ford Mustang S650)		PremiAir Racing (Chevrolet Camaro Mk.6)		4
5	(Australia) Anton de Pasquale (Australia) Tony D'Alberto	11	97	(New Zealand) Shane van Gisbergen (New Zealand) Richie Stanaway	6
5	Dick Johnson Racing (Ford Mustang S650)		Triple Eight Race Engineering (Chevrolet Camaro Mk.6)		6
7	(Australia) David Reynolds (Australia) Garth Tander	26	19	(New Zealand) Matthew Payne (France) Kévin Estre	8
7	Grove Racing (Ford Mustang S650)		Grove Racing (Ford Mustang S650)		8
9	(Australia) Chaz Mostert (Australia) Lee Holdsworth	25	17	(Australia) Will Davison (Australia) Alex Davison	10
9	Walkinshaw Andretti United (Ford Mustang S650)		Dick Johnson Racing (Ford Mustang S650)		10
11	(Australia) Thomas Randle (Australia) Garry Jacobson	55	20	(Australia) Scott Pye (Australia) Warren Luff	12
11	Tickford Racing (Ford Mustang S650)		Charlie Schwerkolt Racing (Chevrolet Camaro Mk.6)		12
13	(New Zealand) Andre Heimgartner (Australia) Dale Wood	8	35	(Australia) Cameron Hill (Australia) Jaylyn Robotham	14
13	Brad Jones Racing (Chevrolet Camaro Mk.6)		Matt Stone Racing (Chevrolet Camaro Mk.6)		14
15	(Australia) Jack Le Brocq (Australia) Jayden Ojeda	34	5	(Australia) James Courtney (Australia) Zak Best	16
15	Matt Stone Racing (Chevrolet Camaro Mk.6)		Tickford Racing (Ford Mustang S650)		16
17	(Australia) Will Brown (Australia) Jack Perkins	9	23	(Australia) Tim Slade (Australia) Jonathon Webb	18
17	Erebus Motorsport (Chevrolet Camaro Mk.6)		PremiAir Racing (Chevrolet Camaro Mk.6)		18
19	(Australia) Mark Winterbottom (Australia) Michael Caruso	18	888	(Australia) Craig Lowndes (Australia) Zane Goddard	20
19	Charlie Schwerkolt Racing (Chevrolet Camaro Mk.6)		Triple Eight Race Engineering (Chevrolet Camaro Mk.6)		20
21	(Australia) Bryce Fullwood (Australia) Dean Fiore	14	3	(Australia) Todd Hazelwood (Australia) Tim Blanchard	22
21	Brad Jones Racing (Chevrolet Camaro Mk.6)		Blanchard Racing Team (Ford Mustang S650)		22
23	(Australia) Nick Percat (New Zealand) Fabian Coulthard	2	96	(Australia) Macauley Jones (Australia) Jordan Boys	24
23	Walkinshaw Andretti United (Ford Mustang S650)		Brad Jones Racing (Chevrolet Camaro Mk.6)		24
25	(Switzerland) Simona de Silvestro (Australia) Kai Allen	98	7	(Australia) Aaron Love (Australia) Jake Kostecki	26
25	Dick Johnson Racing (Ford Mustang S650)		Blanchard Racing Team (Ford Mustang S650)		26
27	(Australia) Jack Smith (New Zealand) Jaxon Evans	4	56	(Australia) Declan Fraser (Australia) Tyler Everingham	28
27	Brad Jones Racing (Chevrolet Camaro Mk.6)		Tickford Racing (Ford Mustang S650)		28

=== Race ===
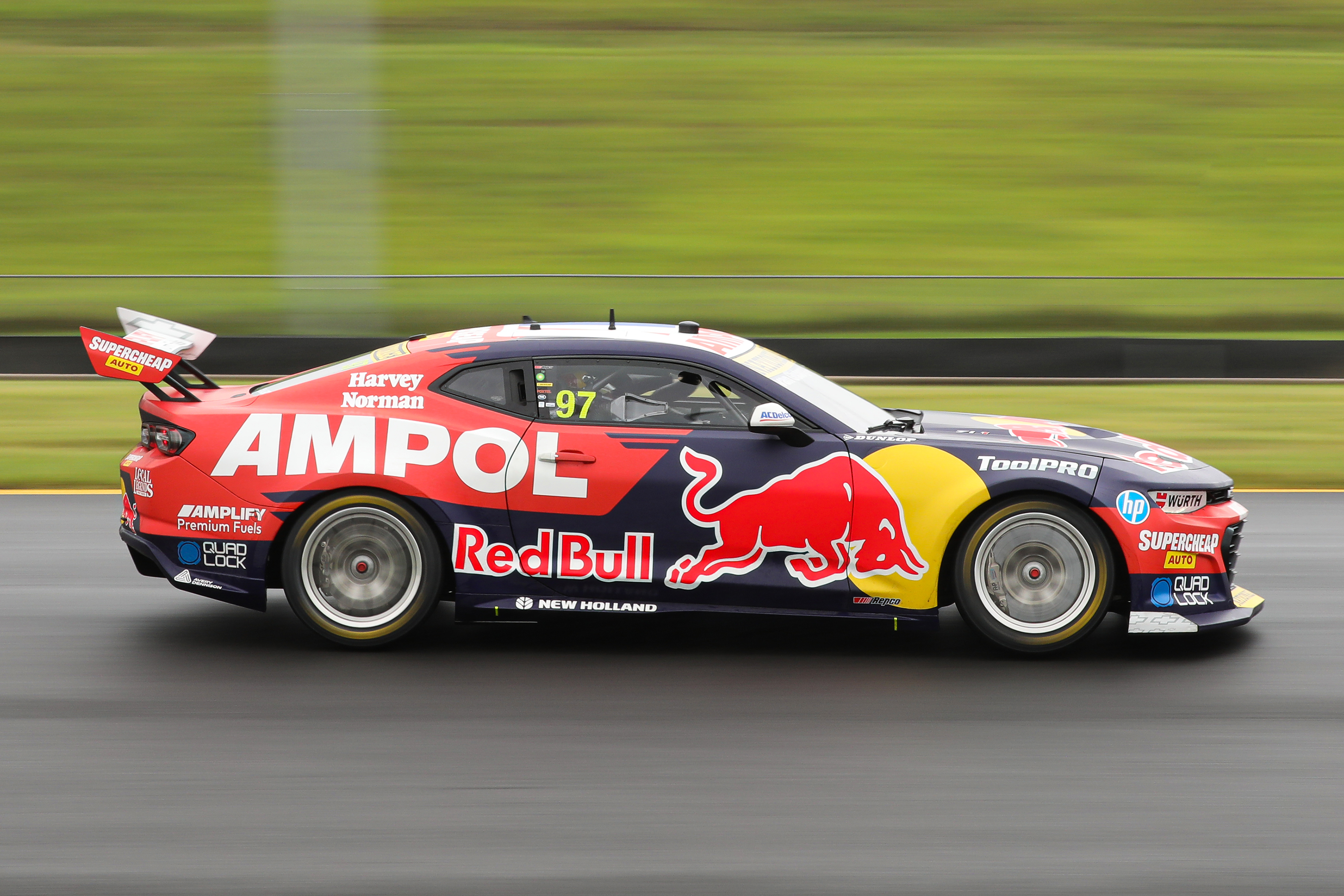
Shane van Gisbergen and Richie Stanaway won Triple Eight Race Engineering's tenth Bathurst 1000.

Pos.	No.	Drivers	Team	Car	Laps	Time/Retired	Grid	Points
1	97	(New Zealand) Shane van Gisbergen (New Zealand) Richie Stanaway	Triple Eight Race Engineering	Chevrolet Camaro Mk.6	161	6:07:07.4957	6	300
2	99	(Australia) Brodie Kostecki (Australia) David Russell	Erebus Motorsport	Chevrolet Camaro Mk.6	161	+19.9626	1	276
3	11	(Australia) Anton de Pasquale (Australia) Tony D'Alberto	Dick Johnson Racing	Ford Mustang S650	161	+33.0867	5	258
4	25	(Australia) Chaz Mostert (Australia) Lee Holdsworth	Walkinshaw Andretti United	Ford Mustang S650	161	+42.8627	9	240
5	26	(Australia) David Reynolds (Australia) Garth Tander	Grove Racing	Ford Mustang S650	161	+49.0905	7	222
6	5	(Australia) James Courtney (Australia) Zak Best	Tickford Racing	Ford Mustang S650	161	+57.0139	16	204
7	14	(Australia) Bryce Fullwood (Australia) Dean Fiore	Brad Jones Racing	Chevrolet Camaro Mk.6	161	+58.0607	21	192
8	9	(Australia) Will Brown (Australia) Jack Perkins	Erebus Motorsport	Chevrolet Camaro Mk.6	161	+1:02.9865	17	180
9	34	(Australia) Jack Le Brocq (Australia) Jayden Ojeda	Matt Stone Racing	Chevrolet Camaro Mk.6	161	+1:13.9283	15	168
10	31	(Australia) James Golding (Australia) Dylan O'Keeffe	PremiAir Racing	Chevrolet Camaro Mk.6	161	+1:15.8346	4	156
11	19	(New Zealand) Matthew Payne (France) Kévin Estre	Grove Racing	Ford Mustang S650	161	+1:19.5182	8	144
12	55	(Australia) Thomas Randle (Australia) Garry Jacobson	Tickford Racing	Ford Mustang S650	161	+1:23.0087	11	138
13	23	(Australia) Tim Slade (Australia) Jonathon Webb	PremiAir Racing	Chevrolet Camaro Mk.6	161	+1:44.1130	18	132
14	2	(Australia) Nick Percat (New Zealand) Fabian Coulthard	Walkinshaw Andretti United	Ford Mustang S650	161	+1:48.1340	23	126
15	35	(Australia) Cameron Hill (Australia) Jaylyn Robotham	Matt Stone Racing	Chevrolet Camaro Mk.6	161	+2:03.7488	14	120
16	17	(Australia) Will Davison (Australia) Alex Davison	Dick Johnson Racing	Ford Mustang S650	161	+2:04.9519	10	114
17	20	(Australia) Scott Pye (Australia) Warren Luff	Charlie Schwerkolt Racing	Chevrolet Camaro Mk.6	160	+1 lap	12	108
18	56	(Australia) Declan Fraser (Australia) Tyler Everingham	Tickford Racing	Ford Mustang S650	160	+1 lap	28	102
19	7	(Australia) Aaron Love (Australia) Jake Kostecki	Blanchard Racing Team	Ford Mustang S650	160	+1 lap	26	96
20	98	(Switzerland) Simona de Silvestro (Australia) Kai Allen	Dick Johnson Racing	Ford Mustang S650	160	+1 lap	25	90
21	4	(Australia) Jack Smith (New Zealand) Jaxon Evans	Brad Jones Racing	Chevrolet Camaro Mk.6	157	+4 laps	27	84
22	96	(Australia) Macauley Jones (Australia) Jordan Boys	Brad Jones Racing	Chevrolet Camaro Mk.6	149	+12 laps	24	78
23	88	(Australia) Broc Feeney (Australia) Jamie Whincup	Triple Eight Race Engineering	Chevrolet Camaro Mk.6	142	+19 laps	2	72
24	888	(Australia) Craig Lowndes (Australia) Zane Goddard	Triple Eight Race Engineering	Chevrolet Camaro Mk.6	141	+20 laps	20	66
DNF	18	(Australia) Mark Winterbottom (Australia) Michael Caruso	Charlie Schwerkolt Racing	Chevrolet Camaro Mk.6	160	Out of fuel	19	
DNF	3	(Australia) Todd Hazelwood (Australia) Tim Blanchard	Blanchard Racing Team	Ford Mustang S650	156	Starter motor	22	
DNF	6	(Australia) Cam Waters (Australia) James Moffat	Tickford Racing	Ford Mustang S650	70	Crash damage	3	
DNF	8	(New Zealand) Andre Heimgartner (Australia) Dale Wood	Brad Jones Racing	Chevrolet Camaro Mk.6	68	Engine	13	
Fastest lap set by Will Brown – 2:07.5431 on Lap 4

== Broadcast ==
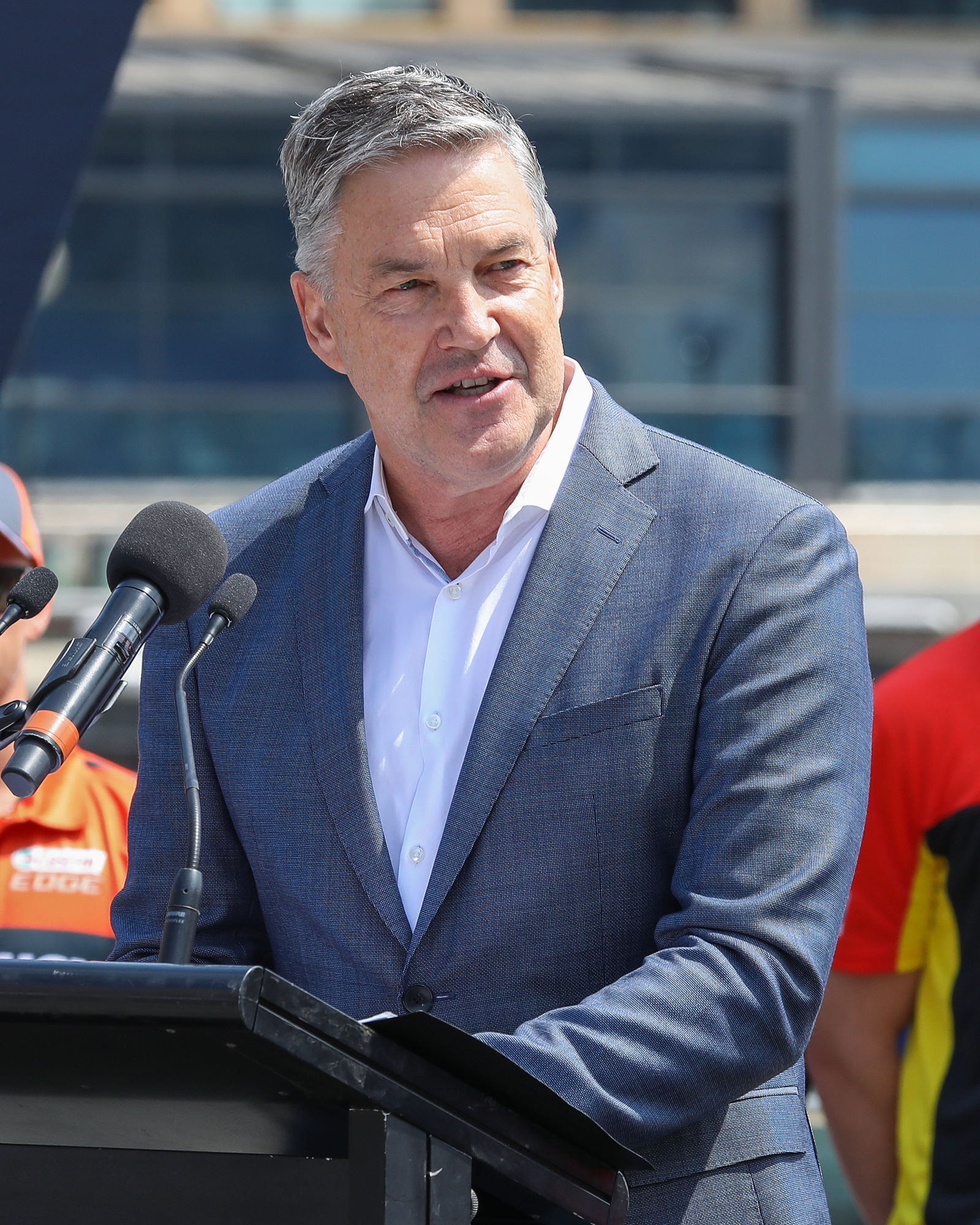
Neil Crompton (pictured in 2020) provided expert commentary for the 20th consecutive year.

The event telecast was produced by Supercars Media and carried domestically by Fox Sports Australia (via Fox Sports 506 and Kayo Sports), a paid service which covered all sessions including support categories, and the Seven Network (via free-to-air channels 7HD and 7mate, as well as streaming on 7plus), which covered select sessions from midday Friday onwards. Radio-only coverage was introduced for 2023, with Sports Entertainment Network covering Saturday and Sunday action. In New Zealand the sessions were shown by paid service Sky Sport, whilst internationally the broadcast was available through the series' pay-per-view service SuperView.

Fox Sports	Seven Network	SEN (radio)
Host: Jessica Yates; Booth: Mark Skaife, Neil Crompton; Pit-lane: Riana Crehan, Mark Larkham, Chad Neylon, Chris Stubbs; Supports: Richard Craill, Greg Murphy, Matt Naulty	Presenters: Mark Beretta, Mel McLaughlin; Pundit: Jack Perkins; Roving: Emma Freedman, Chris Stubbs	Presenter: Aaron Noonan
