= Cooper Murray =

Australian racing driver

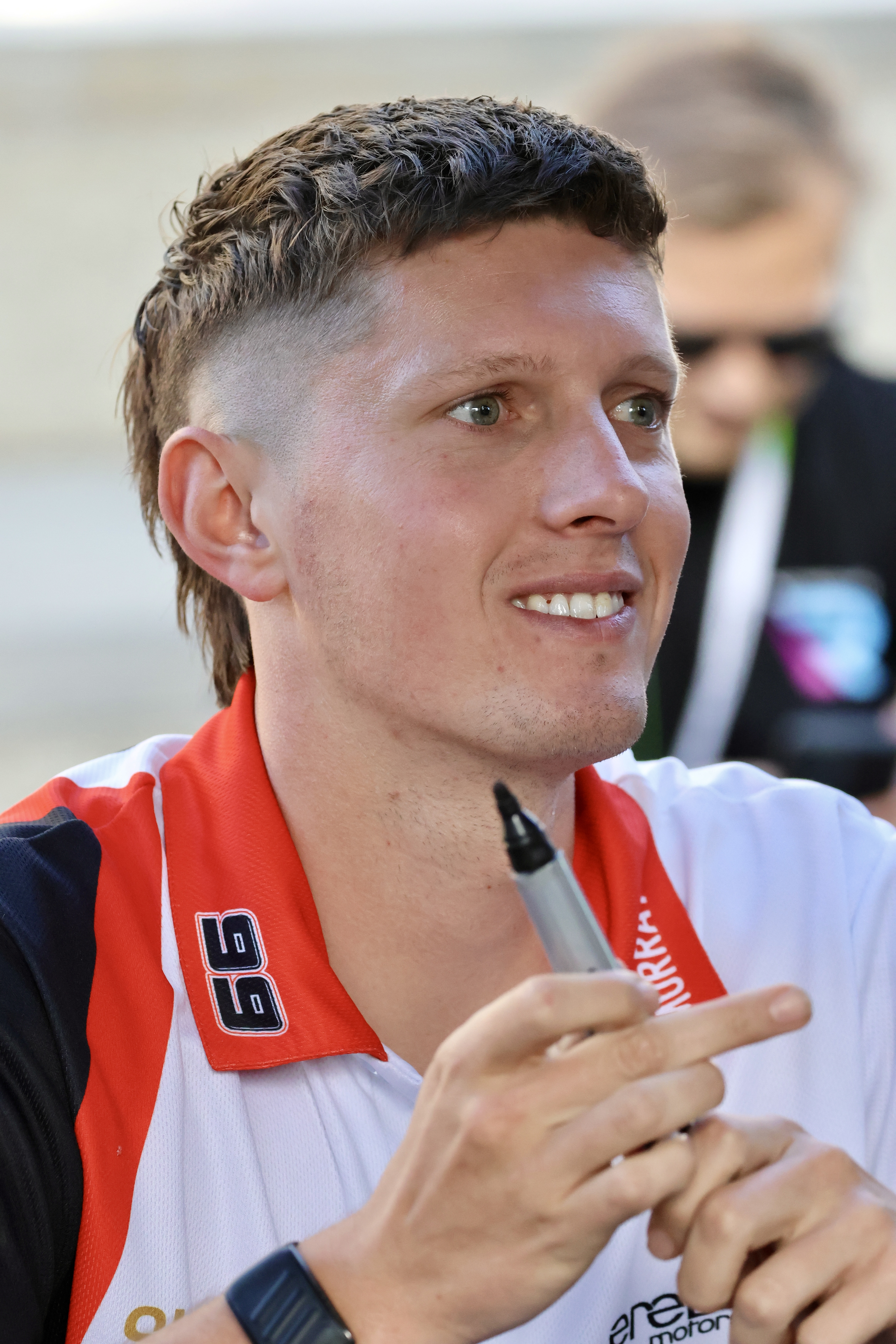
- Murray in 2025
- Nationality: Australian
- Born: 13 August 2001 (age 25) Melbourne, Victoria, Australia

Supercars Championship
- Categorisation: FIA Gold
- Years active: 2024-Current
- Teams: PremiAir Racing
- Starts: 65
- Wins: 0
- Poles: 0
- Fastest laps: 3
- Best finish: 18th in 2025

Previous series
- 2016–2017 2018 2019–2021 2021: Australian Formula Ford Championship; Porsche GT3 Cup Challenge Australia; Porsche Carrera Cup Australia; Porsche Carrera Cup France

Cooper Murray (born 13 August 2001) is a racing driver from Australia. He currently competes in the Repco Supercars Championship driving a Chevrolet Camaro ZL1 for PremiAir Racing. At the 2025 Bathurst 1000, Murray was leading the race with five laps to go but then was spun at Griffins bend by James Golding.

Murray moved from Erebus Motorsport to PremiAir Racing in a mid-season Supercars driver swap following the 2026 Bathurst 1000.

== Racing record ==
=== Karting career summary ===
Season	Series	Position
2010	Champions of Champions Junior Classic - Midgets B	1st
2010	Victorian Closed Kart Titles - Midgets	2nd
2011	Rene & Barney Smith Trophy	1st
2011	Tasmanian Karting Titles - Midgets	1st
2011	South Australian Karting Titles - Midgets	1st
2012	Tasmanian State Championships - Rookies	1st
2012	South Australian State Championships - Rookies	1st
2015	Victorian State Kart Championship - Junior Clubman	3rd

=== Racing career summary ===
Season	Series	Position	Car	Team
2016	Australian Formula Ford Championship	13th	Mygale–Ford SJ13A	Dream Motorsport
2017	Australian Formula Ford Championship	7th	Mygale–Ford SJ13A	Dream Motorsport
2018	Porsche GT3 Cup Challenge Australia	2nd	Porsche 911 GT3 Cup (Type 991)	Lodge Brothers Racing
2019	Porsche Carrera Cup Australia	5th	Porsche 911 GT3 Cup (Type 991)	Ashley Seward Motorsport
2020	Porsche Carrera Cup Australia	– (Note: Championship was declared null and void as not enough events were completed.)	Porsche 911 GT3 Cup (Type 991)	McElrea Racing
2021	Porsche Carrera Cup Australia	2nd	Porsche 911 GT3 Cup (Type 991)	McElrea Racing
2021	Porsche Carrera Cup France	NC	Porsche 911 GT3 Cup (Type 992)	Alméras Frères
2023	Super2 Series	4th	Holden Commodore ZB	Eggleston Motorsport
2024	Super2 Series	19th	Holden Commodore ZB	Eggleston Motorsport
2024	Supercars Championship	28th	Chevrolet Camaro ZL1	Triple Eight Race Engineering; Erebus Motorsport
2025	Supercars Championship	28th	Chevrolet Camaro ZL1	Erebus Motorsport

=== Super2 Series results ===
(key) (Race results only)

Year	Team	Car	1	2	3	4	5	6	7	8	9	10	11	12	Pos.	Pts
2023	Eggleston Motorsport	Holden ZB Commodore	NEW; R1; 1	NEW; R2; 5	PER; R3; 13	PER; R4; 3	TOW; R5; 6	TOW; R6; 16	SAN; R7; 7	SAN; R8; 1	BAT; R9; Ret	BAT; R10; 5	ADE; R11; 2	ADE; R12; 4	4th	1230
2024	Eggleston Motorsport	Holden ZB Commodore	BAT; R1; Ret	BAT; R2; Ret	PER; R3; 2	PER; R4; DSQ	TOW; R5; Ret	TOW; R6; 7	SAN; R7; 12	SAN; R8; 2	BAT; R9	BAT; R10	ADE; R11	ADE; R12	19th	441

=== Supercars Championship results ===
Supercars results
Year	Team	Car	1	2	3	4	5	6	7	8	9	10	11	12	13	14	15	16	17	18	19	20	21	22	23	24	25	26	27	28	29	30	31	32	33	34	35	36	37	Position	Points
2024	Triple Eight Race Engineering	Chevrolet Camaro ZL1	BAT1; R1	BAT1; R2	MEL; R3	MEL; R4	MEL; R5	MEL; R6	TAU; R7	TAU; R8	BAR; R9	BAR; R10	HID; R11; 22	HID; R12; 25	TOW; R13	TOW; R14	SMP; R15	SMP; R16	BEN; R17	BEN; R18	SAN; R19; 5	BAT; R20; 14	SUR; R21	SUR; R22																28th	501
2024	Erebus Motorsport	Chevrolet Camaro ZL1																							ADE; R23; 24	ADE; R24; 18														28th	501
2025	Erebus Motorsport	Chevrolet Camaro ZL1	SMP; R1; 18	SMP; R2; 17	SMP; R3; 23	MEL; R4; 21	MEL; R5; 9	MEL; R6; Ret	MEL; R7; C	TAU; R8; 23	TAU; R9; 23	TAU; R10; 22	SYM; R11; 18	SYM; R12; 20	SYM; R13; 21	BAR; R14; 20	BAR; R15; 23	BAR; R16; Ret	HID; R17; 17	HID; R18; 18	HID; R19; 13	TOW; R20; 17	TOW; R21; 9	TOW; R22; 22	QLD; R23; 6	QLD; R24; 23	QLD; R25; 18	BEN; R26; 7	BAT; R27; 4	SUR; R28; Ret	SUR; R29; 13	SAN; R30; 14	SAN; R31; 11	ADE; R32; 24	ADE; R33; 16	ADE; R34; 23				18th	1201
2026	Erebus Motorsport	Chevrolet Camaro ZL1	SMP; R1; Ret	SMP; R2; 18	SMP; R3; 20	MEL; R4; 10	MEL; R5; 23	MEL; R6; 22	MEL; R7; Ret	TAU; R8; 13	TAU; R9; 20	CHR; R10; 19	CHR; R11; 16	CHR; R12; 18	CHR; R13; 9	SYM; R14; Ret	SYM; R15; 18	SYM; R16; 21	HID; R20; 13	HID; R21; 18	HID; R22; 20	TOW; R23; 13	TOW; R24; 13	TOW; R25; 19	BAR; R17; 13	BAR; R18; 19	BAR; R19; 13	QLD; R26; 14	QLD; R27; 26	QLD; R28; 12	BEN; R28; 18	BAT; R30; 6								17th*	1295*
2026	PremiAir Racing	Chevrolet Camaro ZL1																															SUR; R31; 11	SUR; R32; 17	SAN; R33; 7	SAN; R34; 3	ADE; R35	ADE; R36	ADE; R37	17th*	1295*

=== Complete Bathurst 1000 results ===
Year	Team	Car	Co-driver	Position	Laps
2024	Triple Eight Race Engineering	Chevrolet Camaro Mk.6	(Australia) Craig Lowndes	14th	161
2025	Erebus Motorsport	Chevrolet Camaro Mk.6	(Australia) Jobe Stewart	4th	161
2026	Erebus Motorsport	Chevrolet Camaro Mk.6	(Australia) Lochie Dalton	6th	161

=== Complete Bathurst 6 Hour results ===
Year	Team	Co-drivers	Car	Class	Laps	Pos.	Class pos.
2019	(Australia) Aaron Cameron Racing	(Australia) Kyle Gurton (Australia) Aaron Cameron	Toyota 86 GT	D	121	13th	1st
