= 2024 Bathurst 1000 =

Motor race in Australia

(New South Wales) 2024 Repco Bathurst 1000
Event Information
- Round 10 of 12 in the 2024 Supercars Championship
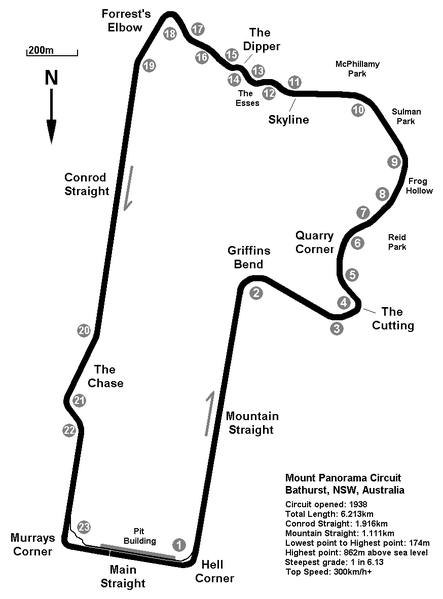
- Layout of the Mount Panorama Circuit
- Date: 10–13 October 2024
- Location: Bathurst, New South Wales
- Venue: Mount Panorama Circuit
- Weather: Fine

Results
Race 1
| Distance | 161 laps | 1000 km |
| Pole position | (Australia) Brodie Kostecki; Erebus Motorsport | 2:05.5119 |
| Winner | (Australia) Brodie Kostecki (Australia) Todd Hazelwood; Erebus Motorsport | 5:58:03.0649 |

The 2024 Bathurst 1000 (commercially titled the 2024 Repco Bathurst 1000) was a motor racing event for Supercars held on the week of 10 to 13 October 2024. It hosted the tenth round of the 2024 Supercars Championship and took place at the Mount Panorama Circuit in Bathurst, New South Wales, Australia, featuring a single race of 1000 kilometres.

Brodie Kostecki and Todd Hazelwood claimed victory for Erebus Motorsport, the teams second win after 2017. Both drivers won the race for the first time, and for Hazelwood it was his first Supercars Championship/Australian Touring Car Championship race win. The winning time of 5 hours and 58 minutes was the fastest in the history of the Bathurst 1000 until 2026, aided by just one safety car period, and the first to be completed in less than six hours.

== Background ==
The event was the 67th running of the Bathurst 1000, which was first held at the Phillip Island Grand Prix Circuit in 1960 as a 500-mile race for Australian-made standard production sedans, and marked the 64th time that the race was held at Mount Panorama. It was the 28th running of the "Australia 1000" race, which was first held after the organisational split between the Australian Racing Drivers Club and V8 Supercars Australia that saw two "Bathurst 1000" races contested in both 1997 and 1998. Shane van Gisbergen and Richie Stanaway were the defending race winners, but did not compete together. Van Gisbergen moved to the United States to race in NASCAR, whilst Stanaway moved to Grove Racing on a full-time basis.

Following a spate of engine failures for Ford teams during the preceding Sandown 500, Ford Performance and Motorsport Powertrains were allowed to fit a different crankshaft – derived from the Ford Mustang GT3 – to all of the Mustangs on reliability grounds. Alterations were also made to the Full Course Yellow procedure. After a minimum lap requirement introduced for the Sandown 500 contributed to the race ending under time-certainty, as well as multiple incidents occurring caused by the speed-limit countdown, the minimum lap requirement was abolished and the FCY speed limit was planned to be raised from 80kph to 120kph – however, the speed limit change was never enforced.

Entering the weekend, Will Brown of Triple Eight Race Engineering led the drivers' championship on 2280 points, 189 points ahead of Chaz Mostert in second and 222 points ahead of team-mate Broc Feeney in third; Triple Eight led the teams' championship on 4308 points, 805 points ahead of Tickford Racing in second and 812 points ahead of Walkinshaw Andretti United in third. A maximum of 300 points were available for drivers, 576 points available for teams.

=== Entry list ===
Twenty-six cars entered the event - 16 sixth-generation Chevrolet Camaros and 10 seventh-generation Ford Mustangs. In addition to the twenty-four regular-season entries, two "wildcard" entrants joined the field – one from Triple Eight Race Engineering, and the other from Super2 team Matt Chahda Motorsport making their second appearance after 2022.

Six drivers, which are main-gamer Ryan Wood and Super2 Series drivers Aaron Cameron, Cameron Crick (son of four-time Bathurst 1000 starter Rodney Crick), Cameron McLeod (grandson of 1987 race winner Peter McLeod), Cooper Murray and 2022 Super3 Series Champion Bradley Vaughan, made their debut in the Bathurst 1000.

| No. | Drivers | Team (Sponsors) | Car | No. | Drivers | Team (Sponsors) | Car |
|---|---|---|---|---|---|---|---|
| 1 | (Australia) Brodie Kostecki (Australia) Todd Hazelwood | Erebus Motorsport (Chiko Roll) | Chevrolet Camaro Mk.6 | 19 | (New Zealand) Matthew Payne (Australia) Garth Tander | Grove Racing (Penrite) | Ford Mustang S650 |
| 2 | (New Zealand) Ryan Wood (New Zealand) Fabian Coulthard | Walkinshaw Andretti United (Mobil 1, Truck Assist) | Ford Mustang S650 | 20 | (Australia) David Reynolds (Australia) Warren Luff | Team 18 (Tradie Beer) | Chevrolet Camaro Mk.6 |
| 3 | (Australia) Aaron Love (Australia) Aaron Cameron | Blanchard Racing Team (CoolDrive) | Ford Mustang S650 | 23 | (Australia) Tim Slade (Australia) Cameron McLeod | PremiAir Racing (Nulon) | Chevrolet Camaro Mk.6 |
| 4 | (Australia) Cameron Hill (Australia) Cameron Crick | Matt Stone Racing (SP Tools) | Chevrolet Camaro Mk.6 | 25 | (Australia) Chaz Mostert (Australia) Lee Holdsworth | Walkinshaw Andretti United (Mobil 1, Optus) | Ford Mustang S650 |
| 6 | (Australia) Cameron Waters (Australia) James Moffat | Tickford Racing (Monster Energy) | Ford Mustang S650 | 26 | (New Zealand) Richie Stanaway (Australia) Dale Wood | Grove Racing (Penrite) | Ford Mustang S650 |
| 7 | (Australia) James Courtney (Australia) Jack Perkins | Blanchard Racing Team (Snowy River Caravans) | Ford Mustang S650 | 31 | (Australia) James Golding (Australia) David Russell | PremiAir Racing (Nulon) | Chevrolet Camaro Mk.6 |
| 8 | (New Zealand) Andre Heimgartner (Australia) Declan Fraser | Brad Jones Racing (R&J Batteries) | Chevrolet Camaro Mk.6 | 50 | (New Zealand) Jaxon Evans (Australia) Dean Fiore | Brad Jones Racing (SCT Logistics) | Chevrolet Camaro Mk.6 |
| 9 | (Australia) Jack Le Brocq (Australia) Jayden Ojeda | Erebus Motorsport (Tyrepower) | Chevrolet Camaro Mk.6 | 55 | (Australia) Thomas Randle (Australia) Tyler Everingham | Tickford Racing (Castrol, Coca-Cola) | Ford Mustang S650 |
| 10 | (Australia) Nick Percat (Australia) Dylan O'Keeffe | Matt Stone Racing (Bendix) | Chevrolet Camaro Mk.6 | 87 | (Australia) Will Brown (Australia) Scott Pye | Triple Eight Race Engineering (Red Bull, Ampol) | Chevrolet Camaro Mk.6 |
| 11 | (Australia) Anton de Pasquale (Australia) Tony D'Alberto | Dick Johnson Racing (Shell V-Power) | Ford Mustang S650 | 88 | (Australia) Broc Feeney (Australia) Jamie Whincup | Triple Eight Race Engineering (Red Bull, Ampol) | Chevrolet Camaro Mk.6 |
| 14 | (Australia) Bryce Fullwood (Australia) Jaylyn Robotham | Brad Jones Racing (Middy's Electrical) | Chevrolet Camaro Mk.6 | 96 | (Australia) Macauley Jones (Australia) Jordan Boys | Brad Jones Racing (Pizza Hut, Venom: The Last Dance) | Chevrolet Camaro Mk.6 |
| 17 | (Australia) Will Davison (Australia) Kai Allen | Dick Johnson Racing (Shell V-Power) | Ford Mustang S650 | 118 | (Australia) Matt Chahda (Australia) Bradley Vaughan | Matt Chahda Motorsport (Boost Mobile) | Chevrolet Camaro Mk.6 |
| 18 | (Australia) Mark Winterbottom (Australia) Michael Caruso | Team 18 (DeWalt) | Chevrolet Camaro Mk.6 | 888 | (Australia) Cooper Murray (Australia) Craig Lowndes | Triple Eight Race Engineering (Supercheap Auto) | Chevrolet Camaro Mk.6 |

== Report ==
=== Thursday ===
Two practice sessions were held on Thursday to begin the weekend. Practice 1 was a largely uneventful affair, aside from Andre Heimgartner suffering a power steering failure, with Matthew Payne topping the opening session. Scott Pye became the first major scalp in the co-driver only Practice 2, the Sandown 500 winner crashing at the Cutting. The session had been delayed due to an eastern brown snake entering the circuit at Forrest Elbow, but ultimately Pye's team-mate Jamie Whincup set the fastest time, two tenths shy of Payne's effort earlier in the day.

=== Friday ===
Practice 3 on Friday morning was dominated by incidents for Matt Stone Racing. Bathurst debutant Cameron Crick crashed approaching Forrest Elbow, and Dylan O'Keeffe ended the session early having spun into the wall at Griffins Bend. Jaxon Evans also found the sand at Hell Corner, but continued undamaged; Broc Feeney continued the form of co-driver Whincup from the previous day, setting the fastest time despite a vibration. Reigning champion Brodie Kostecki set the pace in the last practice session before qualifying as Cooper Murray made late contact at the Dipper.

Provisional qualifying was dominated by major crashes for former race winners. David Reynolds spun in the Esses and crashed head-on into the wall, whilst Will Davison slid into the fence at the Dipper with seconds remaining in the session – Nick Percat stopping to check on the 2009 and 2016 winner in the aftermath of a 58G impact. Both drivers were unhurt, however Davison was winded. Kostecki and Aaron Love also came unstuck at the top of the hill, buckling wheels exiting the Grate. Payne continued his form from Practice 1, setting the fastest time just six-thousandths of a second faster than Cameron Waters – Andre Heimgartner earned his first Top 10 Shootout berth in his 11th Bathurst 1000.

=== Saturday ===
Murray went fastest in Saturday-morning co-driver only practice in the Triple Eight wildcard entry, with Fabian Coulthard and Dale Wood caught out by a Full Course Yellow test. Feeney set the pace in the last session before the Shootout with a 2:06.1274, as Aaron Love backed his Mustang into the wall at the Cutting - his third Supercars Championship crash at the same corner in 9 months having done the same twice at the season-opening Bathurst 500. Three other drivers also found the sand at Hell Corner in Practice 6; Evans as he did the day prior, along with Tony D'Alberto and Craig Lowndes.

Brodie Kostecki claimed back-to-back Bathurst 1000 pole positions in the Top 10 Shootout, despite complaining of a tyre vibration. Provisional pole-sitter Payne only managed seventh having hit the wall exiting Forrest Elbow, whilst his Grove Racing team-mate Richie Stanaway went faster than his provisional time to gain five spots. Heimgartner locked up and went off at the first corner on his first Shootout attempt, rounding out the top 10.

=== Sunday ===
The Sunday morning warm-up was brought to an early end after Payne had a high-speed off into the sand at the Chase; issues also beset Blanchard Racing Team, with the Courtney/Perkins car not turning a lap due to a broken transaxle. Will Brown went fastest in the final session prior to the race, setting a 2:06.6553.

Race

Kostecki led the field away at the start. Feeney and Richie Stanaway jumped Waters off the grid, before Feeney challenged Kostecki up Mountain Straight – the Triple 8 driver ultimately had to cede to Stanaway at Griffins Bend, but regained the position a few laps later after Stanaway misjudged a move for the lead. Stanaway's pace fell away as the opening stint went on, and Waters later passed the defending winner with bump-draft assistance from Brown. Waters fell back down the order before the first pit-stops, having locked up and gone down the escape road at Hell Corner.

Matt Chahda's wildcard entry had an eventful opening 30 laps – the Super2 driver, not used to the tyre package on the Gen3 cars, wore out his tyres and ran off the circuit twice before handing over to rookie co-driver Bradley Vaughan, who was then spun by Chaz Mostert at Forrest Elbow whilst being lapped. Vaughan returned to the garage minus the front bumper, and lost over ten laps repairing the damage. David Reynolds also had a torrid opening stint; the 2017 winner flat-spotted a front tyre, which caused balance issues that affected his car for the remainder of the race.

Ryan Wood's first Bathurst 1000 stint ended with a brush of the tyre wall at pit-entry, damaging the drivers' side door on his Mustang. Garth Tander took over Payne's Mustang, but the five-time winner locked his front wheels and ran down the escape road at Murrays Corner having attempted a pass on Lee Holdsworth. Jayden Ojeda and rookie Cooper Murray became the stars of the second stint, carving their way through the field of mainly co-drivers.

Will Davison received a 5-second pit-stop penalty for pushing Dale Wood off the circuit at the Chase whilst trying to pass him. Chahda also got himself into further strife in the third stint of the race; having received the bad sportsmanship flag for not respecting blue flags, he almost caused a crash by slowing dramatically on Conrod Straight to let James Moffat past. Holdsworth was then forced to lap Chahda around the outside of the kink in the Chase, and deliberately made side-to-side contact with Chahda as retribution. Nick Percat received a mechanical black flag for a loose passenger door, dropping out of the top fifteen.

Car #1 and Car #88 dominated the first three-quarters of the race; the pair were separated by up to 15 seconds out front, but led Car #87 by over double that. Throughout the penultimate stint, having taken over from co-driver Whincup, Feeney began to tear into Kostecki's margin whilst the Erebus driver managed lapped traffic – the Triple 8 driver had reduced the gap to 4 seconds when the first and only caution period of the race was called for Payne after 130 laps. The reigning Adelaide 500 winner reported an inability to downshift at the Cutting and hit the outside wall, resulting in the safety car being deployed.

The status quo remained in the final stint, with Kostecki ultimately pulling away from Feeney in the end having better managed his tyres – the 2023 series champions' lead was threatened by lapped traffic in the closing stages, but was aided by James Courtney refusing to yield for Feeney on the last lap. Cooper Murray's impressive run ended with a drive-through penalty for a safety car infringement, whilst Ryan Wood went off at Hell Corner and stalled trying to rejoin.

== Results ==
=== Practice ===
| Session | Day | Fastest Lap | | | | | | |
| Session | Day | No. | Driver | Team | Car | Time | Cond | Ref |
|---|---|---|---|---|---|---|---|---|
| Practice 1 | Thursday | 19 | (New Zealand) Matthew Payne | Grove Racing | Ford Mustang S650 | 2:07.2941 | Fine | |
| Practice 2 (Co-Driver) | Thursday | 88 | (Australia) Jamie Whincup | Triple Eight Race Engineering | Chevrolet Camaro Mk.6 | 2:07.4788 | Fine | |
| Practice 3 | Friday | 88 | (Australia) Broc Feeney | Triple Eight Race Engineering | Chevrolet Camaro Mk.6 | 2:06.7842 | Fine | |
| Practice 4 | Friday | 1 | (Australia) Brodie Kostecki | Erebus Motorsport | Chevrolet Camaro Mk.6 | 2:06.1820 | Fine | |
| Practice 5 (Co-Driver) | Saturday | 888 | (Australia) Cooper Murray | Triple Eight Race Engineering | Chevrolet Camaro Mk.6 | 2:07.0951 | Overcast | |
| Practice 6 | Saturday | 88 | (Australia) Broc Feeney | Triple Eight Race Engineering | Chevrolet Camaro Mk.6 | 2:06.1274 | Fine | |
| Warm Up | Sunday | 87 | (Australia) Will Brown | Triple Eight Race Engineering | Chevrolet Camaro Mk.6 | 2:06.6553 | Cloudy | |

=== Qualifying ===
==== Provisional ====
| Pos | No. | Driver | Team | Car | Time | Gap | Grid |
|---|---|---|---|---|---|---|---|
| 1 | 19 | (New Zealand) Matthew Payne | Grove Racing | Ford Mustang S650 | 2:05.6452 | | Top 10 |
| 2 | 6 | (Australia) Cameron Waters | Tickford Racing | Ford Mustang S650 | 2:05.6512 | +0.0060 | Top 10 |
| 3 | 88 | (Australia) Broc Feeney | Triple Eight Race Engineering | Chevrolet Camaro Mk.6 | 2:05.6565 | +0.0113 | Top 10 |
| 4 | 1 | (Australia) Brodie Kostecki | Erebus Motorsport | Chevrolet Camaro Mk.6 | 2:05.6646 | +0.0194 | Top 10 |
| 5 | 87 | (Australia) Will Brown | Triple Eight Race Engineering | Chevrolet Camaro Mk.6 | 2:05.7663 | +0.1211 | Top 10 |
| 6 | 25 | (Australia) Chaz Mostert | Walkinshaw Andretti United | Ford Mustang S650 | 2:05.7888 | +0.1436 | Top 10 |
| 7 | 8 | (New Zealand) Andre Heimgartner | Brad Jones Racing | Chevrolet Camaro Mk.6 | 2:05.9268 | +0.2816 | Top 10 |
| 8 | 9 | (Australia) Jack LeBrocq | Erebus Motorsport | Chevrolet Camaro Mk.6 | 2:05.9775 | +0.3323 | Top 10 |
| 9 | 11 | (Australia) Anton de Pasquale | Dick Johnson Racing | Ford Mustang S650 | 2:05.9942 | +0.3490 | Top 10 |
| 10 | 26 | (New Zealand) Richie Stanaway | Grove Racing | Ford Mustang S650 | 2:06.1052 | +0.4600 | Top 10 |
| 11 | 31 | (Australia) James Golding | PremiAir Racing | Chevrolet Camaro Mk.6 | 2:06.1581 | +0.5129 | 11 |
| 12 | 4 | (Australia) Cameron Hill | Matt Stone Racing | Chevrolet Camaro Mk.6 | 2:06.1681 | +0.5229 | 12 |
| 13 | 10 | (Australia) Nick Percat | Matt Stone Racing | Chevrolet Camaro Mk.6 | 2:06.1788 | +0.5336 | 13 |
| 14 | 2 | (New Zealand) Ryan Wood | Walkinshaw Andretti United | Ford Mustang S650 | 2:06.2512 | +0.6060 | 14 |
| 15 | 50 | (New Zealand) Jaxon Evans | Brad Jones Racing | Chevrolet Camaro Mk.6 | 2:06.2532 | +0.6080 | 15 |
| 16 | 17 | (Australia) Will Davison | Dick Johnson Racing | Ford Mustang S650 | 2:06.2801 | +0.6349 | 16 |
| 17 | 96 | (Australia) Macauley Jones | Brad Jones Racing | Chevrolet Camaro Mk.6 | 2:06.5656 | +0.9204 | 17 |
| 18 | 888 | (Australia) Cooper Murray | Triple Eight Race Engineering | Chevrolet Camaro Mk.6 | 2:06.5881 | +0.9429 | 18 |
| 19 | 55 | (Australia) Thomas Randle | Tickford Racing | Ford Mustang S650 | 2:06.5956 | +0.9504 | 19 |
| 20 | 3 | (Australia) Aaron Love | Blanchard Racing Team | Ford Mustang S650 | 2:06.6722 | +1.0270 | 20 |
| 21 | 20 | (Australia) David Reynolds | Team 18 | Chevrolet Camaro Mk.6 | 2:06.6807 | +1.0355 | 21 |
| 22 | 18 | (Australia) Mark Winterbottom | Team 18 | Chevrolet Camaro Mk.6 | 2:06.7368 | +1.0916 | 22 |
| 23 | 7 | (Australia) James Courtney | Blanchard Racing Team | Ford Mustang S650 | 2:06.7475 | +1.1023 | 23 |
| 24 | 14 | (Australia) Bryce Fullwood | Brad Jones Racing | Chevrolet Camaro Mk.6 | 2:06.9160 | +1.2708 | 24 |
| 25 | 23 | (Australia) Tim Slade | PremiAir Racing | Chevrolet Camaro Mk.6 | 2:06.9791 | +1.3339 | 25 |
| 26 | 118 | (Australia) Matt Chahda | Matt Chahda Motorsport | Chevrolet Camaro Mk.6 | 2:07.9523 | +2.3071 | 26 |

==== Top 10 Shootout ====
| Pos | No. | Driver | Team | Car | Time | Gap |
|---|---|---|---|---|---|---|
| 1 | 1 | (Australia) Brodie Kostecki | Erebus Motorsport | Chevrolet Camaro Mk.6 | 2:05.5119 | |
| 2 | 6 | (Australia) Cameron Waters | Tickford Racing | Ford Mustang S650 | 2:05.6429 | +0.1310 |
| 3 | 88 | (Australia) Broc Feeney | Triple Eight Race Engineering | Chevrolet Camaro Mk.6 | 2:05.8618 | +0.3499 |
| 4 | 26 | (New Zealand) Richie Stanaway | Grove Racing | Ford Mustang S650 | 2:05.9286 | +0.4167 |
| 5 | 87 | (Australia) Will Brown | Triple Eight Race Engineering | Chevrolet Camaro Mk.6 | 2:06.1625 | +0.6506 |
| 6 | 9 | (Australia) Jack Le Brocq | Erebus Motorsport | Chevrolet Camaro Mk.6 | 2:06.1827 | +0.6708 |
| 7 | 19 | (New Zealand) Matthew Payne | Grove Racing | Ford Mustang S650 | 2:06.2373 | +0.7254 |
| 8 | 11 | (Australia) Anton de Pasquale | Dick Johnson Racing | Ford Mustang S650 | 2:06.2385 | +0.7266 |
| 9 | 25 | (Australia) Chaz Mostert | Walkinshaw Andretti United | Ford Mustang S650 | 2:06.5411 | +1.0292 |
| 10 | 8 | (New Zealand) Andre Heimgartner | Brad Jones Racing | Chevrolet Camaro Mk.6 | 2:15.1206 | +9.6087 |

=== Grid ===
| Inside row | | | Outside row | | |
|---|---|---|---|---|---|
| 1 | (Australia) Brodie Kostecki (Australia) Todd Hazelwood | 1 | 6 | (Australia) Cameron Waters (Australia) James Moffat | 2 |
| 1 | Erebus Motorsport (Chevrolet Camaro Mk.6) | | Tickford Racing (Ford Mustang S650) | | 2 |
| 3 | (Australia) Broc Feeney (Australia) Jamie Whincup | 88 | 26 | (New Zealand) Richie Stanaway (Australia) Dale Wood | 4 |
| 3 | Triple Eight Race Engineering (Chevrolet Camaro Mk.6) | | Grove Racing (Ford Mustang S650) | | 4 |
| 5 | (Australia) Will Brown (Australia) Scott Pye | 87 | 9 | (Australia) Jack Le Brocq (Australia) Jayden Ojeda | 6 |
| 5 | Triple Eight Race Engineering (Chevrolet Camaro Mk.6) | | Erebus Motorsport (Chevrolet Camaro Mk.6) | | 6 |
| 7 | (New Zealand) Matthew Payne (Australia) Garth Tander | 19 | 11 | (Australia) Anton de Pasquale (Australia) Tony D'Alberto | 8 |
| 7 | Grove Racing (Ford Mustang S650) | | Dick Johnson Racing (Ford Mustang S650) | | 8 |
| 9 | (Australia) Chaz Mostert (Australia) Lee Holdsworth | 25 | 8 | (New Zealand) Andre Heimgartner (Australia) Declan Fraser | 10 |
| 9 | Walkinshaw Andretti United (Ford Mustang S650) | | Brad Jones Racing (Chevrolet Camaro Mk.6) | | 10 |
| 11 | (Australia) James Golding (Australia) David Russell | 31 | 4 | (Australia) Cameron Hill (Australia) Cameron Crick | 12 |
| 11 | PremiAir Racing (Chevrolet Camaro Mk.6) | | Matt Stone Racing (Chevrolet Camaro Mk.6) | | 12 |
| 13 | (Australia) Nick Percat (Australia) Dylan O'Keeffe | 10 | 2 | (New Zealand) Ryan Wood (New Zealand) Fabian Coulthard | 14 |
| 13 | Matt Stone Racing (Chevrolet Camaro Mk.6) | | Walkinshaw Andretti United (Ford Mustang S650) | | 14 |
| 15 | (New Zealand) Jaxon Evans (Australia) Dean Fiore | 50 | 17 | (Australia) Will Davison (Australia) Kai Allen | 16 |
| 15 | Brad Jones Racing (Chevrolet Camaro Mk.6) | | Dick Johnson Racing (Ford Mustang S650) | | 16 |
| 17 | (Australia) Macauley Jones (Australia) Jordan Boys | 96 | 888 | (Australia) Craig Lowndes (Australia) Cooper Murray | 18 |
| 17 | Brad Jones Racing (Chevrolet Camaro Mk.6) | | Triple Eight Race Engineering (Chevrolet Camaro Mk.6) | | 18 |
| 19 | (Australia) Thomas Randle (Australia) Tyler Everingham | 55 | 3 | (Australia) Aaron Love (Australia) Aaron Cameron | 20 |
| 19 | Tickford Racing (Ford Mustang S650) | | Blanchard Racing Team (Ford Mustang S650) | | 20 |
| 21 | (Australia) David Reynolds (Australia) Warren Luff | 20 | 18 | (Australia) Mark Winterbottom (Australia) Michael Caruso | 22 |
| 21 | Team 18 (Chevrolet Camaro Mk.6) | | Team 18 (Chevrolet Camaro Mk.6) | | 22 |
| 23 | (Australia) James Courtney (Australia) Jack Perkins | 7 | 14 | (Australia) Bryce Fullwood (Australia) Jaylyn Robotham | 24 |
| 23 | Blanchard Racing Team (Ford Mustang S650) | | Brad Jones Racing (Chevrolet Camaro Mk.6) | | 24 |
| 25 | (Australia) Tim Slade (Australia) Cameron McLeod | 23 | 118 | (Australia) Matt Chahda (Australia) Bradley Vaughan | 26 |
| 25 | PremiAir Racing (Chevrolet Camaro Mk.6) | | Matt Chahda Motorsport (Chevrolet Camaro Mk.6) | | 26 |

=== Race ===
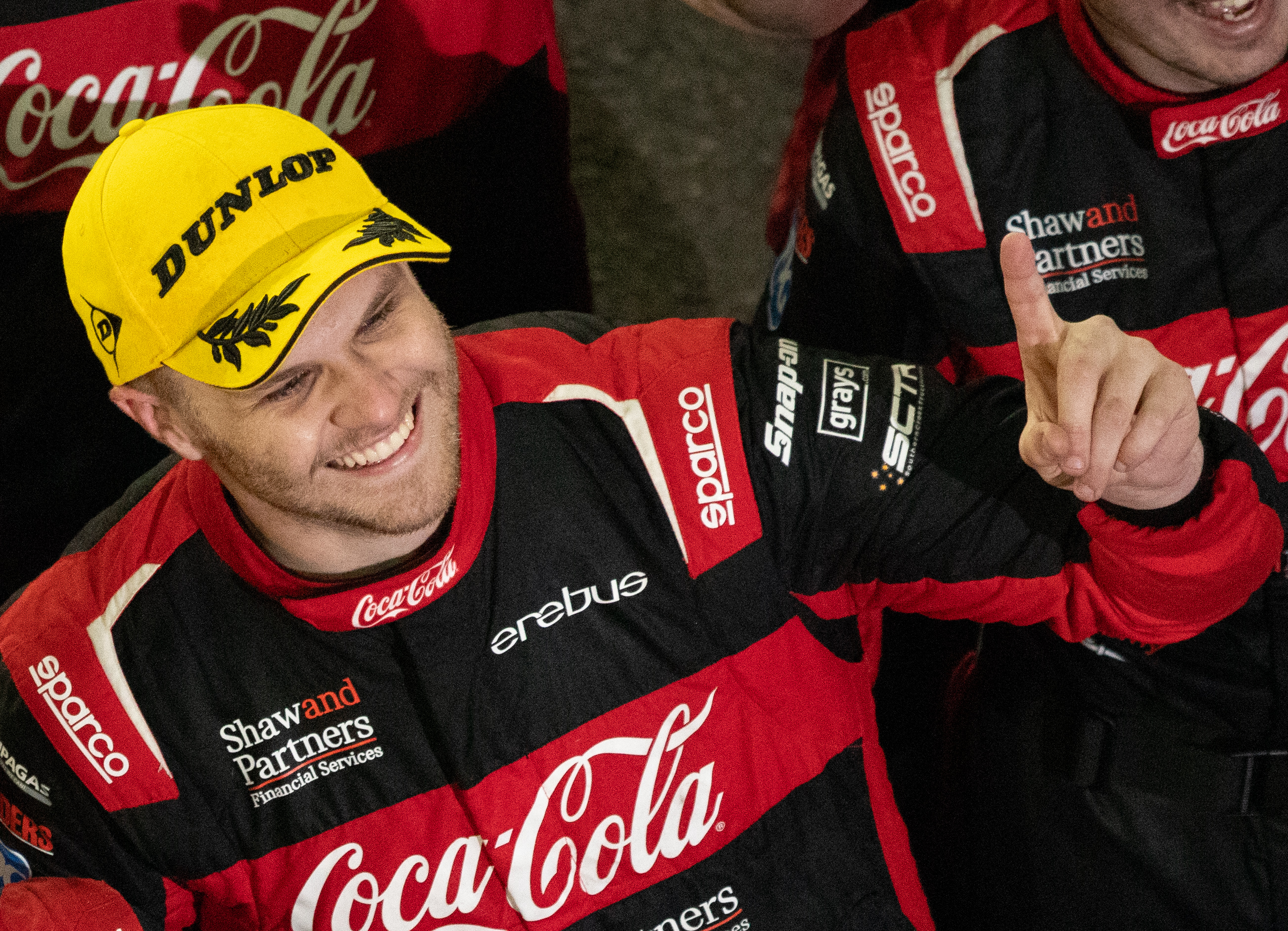

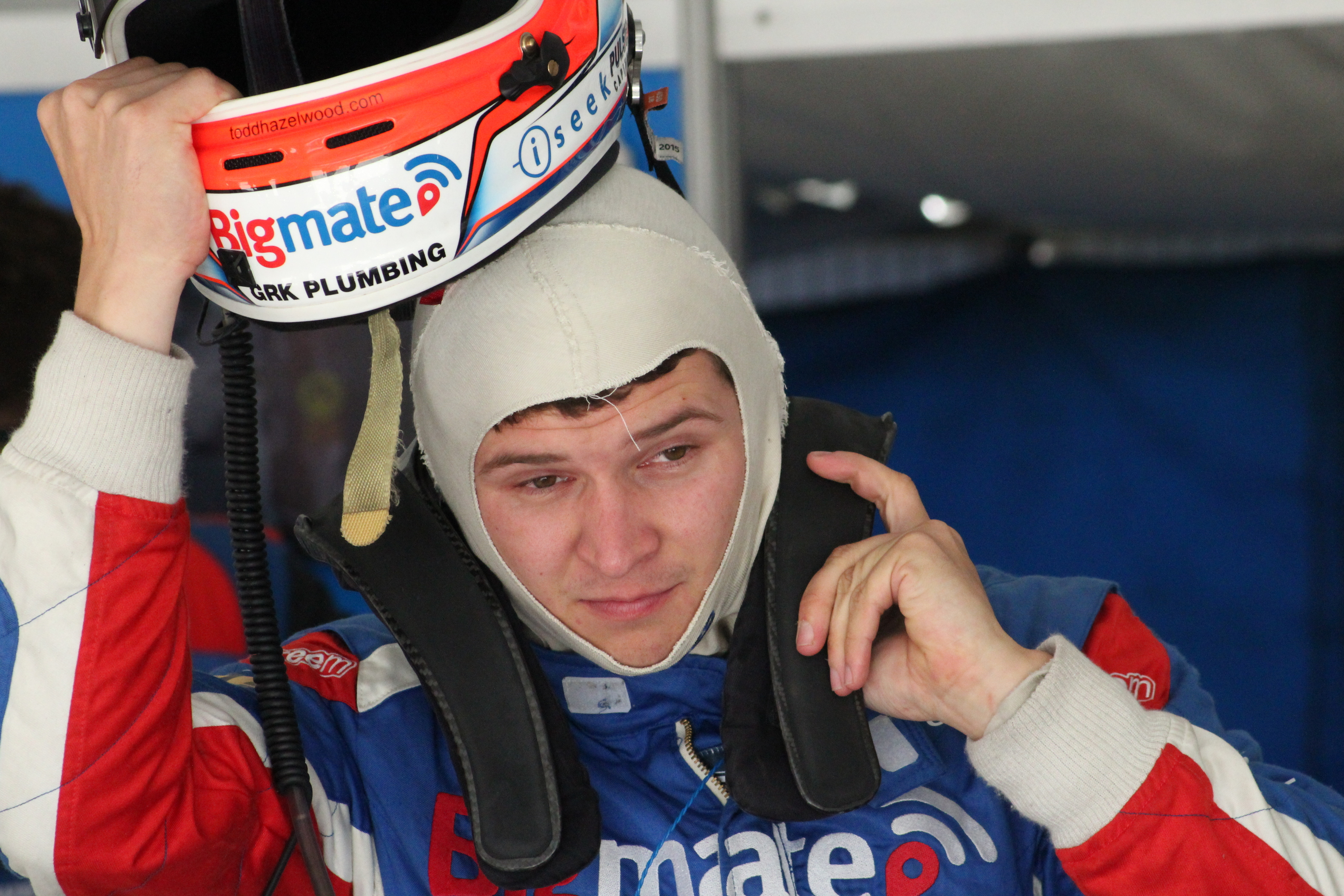
Brodie Kostecki (top, pictured in 2023) and Todd Hazelwood (bottom, pictured in 2017) won the race for Erebus Motorsport and Chevrolet from pole position.

| Pos. | No. | Drivers | Team | Car | Laps | Time/Retired | Grid | Points |
|---|---|---|---|---|---|---|---|---|
| 1 | 1 | (Australia) Brodie Kostecki (Australia) Todd Hazelwood | Erebus Motorsport | Chevrolet Camaro Mk.6 | 161 | 5:58:03.0649 | 1 | 300 |
| 2 | 88 | (Australia) Broc Feeney (Australia) Jamie Whincup | Triple Eight Race Engineering | Chevrolet Camaro Mk.6 | 161 | +1.3496 | 3 | 276 |
| 3 | 87 | (Australia) Will Brown (Australia) Scott Pye | Triple Eight Race Engineering | Chevrolet Camaro Mk.6 | 161 | +13.6404 | 5 | 258 |
| 4 | 6 | (Australia) Cameron Waters (Australia) James Moffat | Tickford Racing | Ford Mustang S650 | 161 | +15.1169 | 2 | 240 |
| 5 | 25 | (Australia) Chaz Mostert (Australia) Lee Holdsworth | Walkinshaw Andretti United | Ford Mustang S650 | 161 | +15.8428 | 9 | 222 |
| 6 | 31 | (Australia) James Golding (Australia) David Russell | PremiAir Racing | Chevrolet Camaro Mk.6 | 161 | +17.5856 | 11 | 204 |
| 7 | 11 | (Australia) Anton De Pasquale (Australia) Tony D'Alberto | Dick Johnson Racing | Ford Mustang S650 | 161 | +26.7384 | 8 | 192 |
| 8 | 9 | (Australia) Jack Le Brocq (Australia) Jayden Ojeda | Erebus Motorsport | Chevrolet Camaro Mk.6 | 161 | +29.7233 | 6 | 180 |
| 9 | 26 | (New Zealand) Richie Stanaway (Australia) Dale Wood | Grove Racing | Ford Mustang S650 | 161 | +32.2044 | 4 | 168 |
| 10 | 4 | (Australia) Cameron Hill (Australia) Cameron Crick | Matt Stone Racing | Chevrolet Camaro Mk.6 | 161 | +33.6141 | 12 | 156 |
| 11 | 55 | (Australia) Thomas Randle (Australia) Tyler Everingham | Tickford Racing | Ford Mustang S650 | 161 | +34.417 | 19 | 144 |
| 12 | 17 | (Australia) Will Davison (Australia) Kai Allen | Dick Johnson Racing | Ford Mustang S650 | 161 | +34.9590 | 16 | 138 |
| 13 | 96 | (Australia) Macauley Jones (Australia) Jordan Boys | Brad Jones Racing | Chevrolet Camaro Mk.6 | 161 | +40.2488 | 17 | 132 |
| 14 | 888 | (Australia) Craig Lowndes (Australia) Cooper Murray | Triple Eight Race Engineering | Chevrolet Camaro Mk.6 | 161 | +55.9923 | 18 | 126 |
| 15 | 2 | (New Zealand) Ryan Wood (New Zealand) Fabian Coulthard | Walkinshaw Andretti United | Ford Mustang S650 | 161 | +1:14.0957 | 14 | 120 |
| 16 | 8 | (New Zealand) Andre Heimgartner (Australia) Declan Fraser | Brad Jones Racing | Chevrolet Camaro Mk.6 | 161 | +1:47.7824 | 10 | 114 |
| 17 | 10 | (Australia) Nick Percat (Australia) Dylan O'Keeffe | Matt Stone Racing | Chevrolet Camaro Mk.6 | 161 | +1:50.5959 | 13 | 108 |
| 18 | 18 | (Australia) Mark Winterbottom (Australia) Michael Caruso | Team 18 | Chevrolet Camaro Mk.6 | 161 | +1:56.6408 | 22 | 102 |
| 19 | 23 | (Australia) Tim Slade (Australia) Cameron McLeod | PremiAir Racing | Chevrolet Camaro Mk.6 | 161 | +1:58.6041 | 25 | 96 |
| 20 | 50 | (New Zealand) Jaxon Evans (Australia) Dean Fiore | Brad Jones Racing | Chevrolet Camaro Mk.6 | 161 | +2:01.5311 | 15 | 90 |
| 21 | 7 | (Australia) James Courtney (Australia) Jack Perkins | Blanchard Racing Team | Ford Mustang S650 | 160 | +1 lap | 23 | 84 |
| 22 | 14 | (Australia) Bryce Fullwood (Australia) Jaylyn Robotham | Brad Jones Racing | Chevrolet Camaro Mk.6 | 160 | +1 lap | 24 | 78 |
| 23 | 3 | (Australia) Aaron Love (Australia) Aaron Cameron | Blanchard Racing Team | Ford Mustang S650 | 160 | +1 lap | 20 | 72 |
| 24 | 20 | (Australia) David Reynolds (Australia) Warren Luff | Team 18 | Chevrolet Camaro Mk.6 | 159 | +2 laps | 21 | 66 |
| 25 | 118 | (Australia) Matt Chahda (Australia) Bradley Vaughan | Matt Chahda Motorsport | Chevrolet Camaro Mk.6 | 146 | +15 laps | 26 | 63 |
| DNF | 19 | (New Zealand) Matthew Payne (Australia) Garth Tander | Grove Racing | Ford Mustang S650 | 130 | Crash | 7 | |
Fastest lap set by Broc Feeney – 2:07.8610 on Lap 142

== Standings ==
Drivers' Championship standings

| Pos | Driver | Pts | Gap |
|---|---|---|---|
| 1 | (Australia) Will Brown | 2538 | |
| 2 | (Australia) Broc Feeney | 2334 | +204 |
| 3 | (Australia) Chaz Mostert | 2313 | +225 |
| 4 | (Australia) Cameron Waters | 2074 | +464 |
| 5 | (Australia) James Golding | 1718 | +820 |

Teams Championship

| Pos | Team | Pts | Gap |
|---|---|---|---|
| 1 | Triple Eight Race Engineering (87, 88) | 4842 | |
| 2 | Tickford Racing | 3617 | +1225 |
| 3 | Walkinshaw Andretti United | 3568 | +1274 |
| 4 | Dick Johnson Racing | 3061 | +1781 |
| 5 | Matt Stone Racing | 2926 | +1916 |

- Note: Only the top five positions are included for each set of standings.

== Broadcast ==
The event telecast was produced by Supercars Media and carried domestically by Fox Sports Australia (via Fox Sports 506 and Kayo Sports), a paid service which covered all sessions including support categories, and the Seven Network (via free-to-air channels 7HD and 7mate, as well as streaming on 7plus), which covered select sessions from midday Friday onwards. In New Zealand the sessions were shown by paid service Sky Sport, whilst internationally the broadcast was available through the series' pay-per-view service SuperView.

| Fox Sports | Seven Network |
|---|---|
| Host: Jessica Yates; Booth: Mark Skaife, Neil Crompton; Pit-lane: Mark Larkham, Riana Crehan, Chad Neylon, Molly Taylor | Presenters: Mark Beretta, Mel McLaughlin; Pundits: Jack Perkins, Aaron Noonan; Roving: Emma Freedman, Chris Stubbs |
