= 2020 Porsche Carrera Cup Australia =

Automobiles competition

The 2020 Porsche PAYCE Carrera Cup Australia was the sixteenth running of the Porsche Carrera Cup Australia motor racing series. This season had been greatly affected by the COVID-19 pandemic and had the scheduled rounds in the calendar cancelled after the first race of round two during the 2020 Australian Formula 1 Grand Prix weekend in Albert Park Melbourne. The year's season had a weekend at Sandown Raceway from the 11–13 December. No champion was crowned this year's season due to the COVID-19 pandemic.

== Teams and drivers ==
Team	Class	No.	Driver	Rounds
Grove Racing	PA	4	(Australia) Stephen Grove	1–2
Grove Racing	P	888	(Australia) Craig Lowndes	2
McElrea Racing	PA	6	(New Zealand) Tim Miles	1–2
McElrea Racing	P	7	(Australia) Harri Jones	1–2
McElrea Racing	PA	30	(Australia) David Ryan	1–2
McElrea Racing	P	36	(Australia) Cooper Murray	1–2
Porsche Centre Melbourne	P	8	(Australia) Nick McBride	1–2
Porsche Centre Melbourne	PA	9	(Australia) Marc Cini	1–2
Buik Motorsports	PA	13	(Australia) Sam Shahin	2
Volante Rosso Motorsport	P	15	(Australia) Josh Hunt	1
Ashley Seward Motorsport	PA	22	(Australia) Dean Cook	1–2
Ashley Seward Motorsport	PA	80	(Australia) Max Twigg	1–2
Lago Racing	P	23	(Australia) David Russell	1
Lago Racing	PA	23	(Australia) Roger Lago	2
Garth Walden Racing	P	34	(Australia) Duvashen Padayachee	1–2
Garth Walden Racing	PA	35	(Australia) Indiran Padayachee	1–2
Wall Racing	P	38	(Australia) David Wall	1–2
Wall Racing	PA	68	(Australia) Greg Ward	1–2
Wall Racing	P	96	(Australia) Joey Mawson	1
Sonic Motor Racing Services	P	77	(Australia) Michael Almond	1–2
Sonic Motor Racing Services	P	78	(Australia) Aaron Love	1–2
Sonic Motor Racing Services	P	100	(Australia) Dale Wood	1–2
Sonic Motor Racing Services	P	777	(Australia) Max Vidau	1–2
Cameron Hill Racing	P	111	(Australia) Cameron Hill	1–2
Scott Taylor Motorsport	PA	222	(Australia) Scott Taylor	1–2

== Calendar ==
A revised calendar for the remaining season was announced on 19 June 2020.

Rnd		Circuit	Date	Pole position	Fastest lap	Winning driver	Winning team	Winning pro-am
1	R1	Adelaide Street Circuit (Adelaide, South Australia)	20–23 February	(Australia) Cooper Murray	(Australia) Cooper Murray	(Australia) Cooper Murray	McElrea Racing	(Australia) Dean Cook
1	R2	Adelaide Street Circuit (Adelaide, South Australia)	20–23 February		(Australia) Nick McBride	(Australia) Cooper Murray	McElrea Racing	(Australia) Max Twigg
1	R3	Adelaide Street Circuit (Adelaide, South Australia)	20–23 February		(Australia) Cooper Murray	(Australia) Cooper Murray	McElrea Racing	(Australia) Stephen Grove
2	R1	(Victoria (state)) Melbourne Grand Prix Circuit (Melbourne, Victoria)	12–15 March (Note: The Albert Park Circuit was intended to be run in support of the 2020 Australian Grand Prix. First race had been completed Thursday when a Formula One mechanic tested positive for COVID-19. The Grand Prix was cancelled and officials ended the Porsche meeting.)	(Australia) Dale Wood	(Australia) Cooper Murray	(Australia) Cameron Hill	Cameron Hill Racing	(Australia) Stephen Grove
2	R2	(Victoria (state)) Melbourne Grand Prix Circuit (Melbourne, Victoria)	12–15 March	Cancelled due to the COVID-19 pandemic				
2	R3	(Victoria (state)) Melbourne Grand Prix Circuit (Melbourne, Victoria)	12–15 March	Cancelled due to the COVID-19 pandemic				
2	R4	(Victoria (state)) Melbourne Grand Prix Circuit (Melbourne, Victoria)	12–15 March	Cancelled due to the COVID-19 pandemic				
3	R1	Sydney Motorsport Park (Sydney, New South Wales)	15–16 August					
3	R2	Sydney Motorsport Park (Sydney, New South Wales)	15–16 August					
3	R3	Sydney Motorsport Park (Sydney, New South Wales)	15–16 August					
4	R1	Townsville Street Circuit (Townsville, Queensland)	29–30 August					
4	R2	Townsville Street Circuit (Townsville, Queensland)	29–30 August					
4	R3	Townsville Street Circuit (Townsville, Queensland)	29–30 August					
5	R1	(Victoria (state)) Sandown Raceway (Melbourne, Victoria)	19–20 September					
5	R2	(Victoria (state)) Sandown Raceway (Melbourne, Victoria)	19–20 September					
5	R3	(Victoria (state)) Sandown Raceway (Melbourne, Victoria)	19–20 September					
6	R1	Mount Panorama Circuit (Bathurst, New South Wales)	8–11 October					
6	R2	Mount Panorama Circuit (Bathurst, New South Wales)	8–11 October					
6	R3	Mount Panorama Circuit (Bathurst, New South Wales)	8–11 October					
Cancelled due to the COVID-19 pandemic
3	R1	(Victoria (state)) Winton Motor Raceway (Winton, Victoria)	18–19 July					
3	R2	(Victoria (state)) Winton Motor Raceway (Winton, Victoria)	18–19 July					
3	R3	(Victoria (state)) Winton Motor Raceway (Winton, Victoria)	18–19 July					

== Series standings ==
Series standings are as follows:

Pos.	Driver	ADE (South Australia)			ALB (Victoria (state))				SYD (New South Wales)	TOW (Queensland)	SAN (Victoria (state))	BAT (New South Wales)	Pts.
Pro
1	(Australia) Cooper Murray	1	1	1	3	C	C	C					217
2	(Australia) David Wall	2	2	2	4	C	C	C					194
3	(Australia) Aaron Love	4	3	4	5	C	C	C					159
4	(Australia) Cameron Hill	3	8	7	1	C	C	C					148
5	(Australia) Dale Wood	7	4	3	8	C	C	C					140
6	(Australia) Nick McBride	9	7	8	2	C	C	C					119
7	(Australia) Max Vidau	8	6	5	9	C	C	C					111
8	(Australia) David Russell	5	5	6									104
9	(Australia) Duvashen Padayachee	10	9	10	6	C	C	C					87
10	(Australia) Harri Jones	11	10	9	7	C	C	C					83
11	(Australia) Michael Almond	6	Ret	18	12	C	C	C					52
12	(Australia) Josh Hunt	12	11	19									41
13	(Australia) Craig Lowndes				Ret	C	C	C					0
14	(Australia) Joey Mawson	DNS	DNS	DNS									0
Pro-Am
1	(Australia) Stephen Grove	16	14	11	10	C	C	C					141
2	(Australia) David Ryan	17	17	14	17	C	C	C					116
3	(Australia) Dean Cook	13	13	Ret	20	C	C	C					114
4	(Australia) Max Twigg	14	12	Ret	14	C	C	C					114
5	(Australia) Marc Cini	15	16	18	15	C	C	C					113
6	(New Zealand) Tim Miles	Ret	15	12	16	C	C	C					96
7	(Australia) Indiran Padayachee	19	18	16	21	C	C	C					94
8	(Australia) Greg Ward	20	19	17	19	C	C	C					86
9	(Australia) Scott Taylor	18	Ret	15	18	C	C	C					74
10	(Australia) Roger Lago				11	C	C	C					41
11	(Australia) Sam Shahin				13	C	C	C					36
Pos.	Driver	ADE (South Australia)			ALB (Victoria (state))				SYD (New South Wales)	TOW (Queensland)	SAN (Victoria (state))	BAT (New South Wales)	Pts.
