= Aaron Love =

Australian racing driver

- Nationality: Australian
- Born: 26 March 2002 (age 24) Perth, Western Australia
- Relatives: Jordan Love (brother)

Supercars Championship
- Categorisation: FIA Silver (until 2024); FIA Gold (2025–)
- Years active: 2023–2025
- Teams: Blanchard Racing Team
- Starts: 29
- Wins: 0
- Poles: 0
- Fastest laps: 0
- Best finish: 24th in 2024

Previous series
- 2017–2018 2017–18 2019 2019 2019–2022 2022 2022 2023: Australian Formula 4 Championship; Formula 4 South East Asia Championship; Radical Australia Cup; Porsche GT3 Cup Challenge Australia; Porsche Carrera Cup Australia; Porsche Carrera Cup France; Porsche Supercup; S5000 Australian Drivers' Championship

Championship titles
- 2018: Western Australia F1000

Awards
- 2023: Motorsport Australia Young Driver of the Year

Aaron Love (born 26 March 2002) is an Australian racing driver who competes in the Porsche Equity-One Carrera Cup Australia Championship. He previously competed in the Supercars Championship.

== Results ==
=== Career summary ===
Season	Series	Team	Races	Wins	Poles	F/Laps	Podiums	Points	Position
2016	Western Australia F1000 Championship	Aaron Love	3	0	0	0	2	52	16th
2017	Australian Formula 4 Championship	Team BRM	21	0	0	0	1	101	9th
2017	Western Australia F1000 Championship	Aaron Love	12	0	0	0	0	135	10th
2017–18	Formula 4 South East Asia Championship	Meritus Grand Prix	6	0	0	0	3	64	18th
2018	Australian Formula 4 Championship	Team BRM	21	1	0	0	15	307	**3rd**
2018	Western Australia F1000 Championship	Aaron Love	21	12	3	19	20	456	**1st**
2019	Radical Australia Cup	Team BRM	4	1	1	2	3	126	14th
2019	Porsche GT3 Cup Challenge Australia	Sonic Motor Racing Services	18	6	0	5	11	886	**2nd**
2019	Porsche Carrera Cup Australia	Sonic Motor Racing Services	3	0	0	0	0	67	24th
2020	Porsche Carrera Cup Australia	Sonic Motor Racing Services	7	1	0	2	4	132	**3rd**
2021	Porsche Carrera Cup Australia	Sonic Motor Racing Services	13	0	0	2	5	177	5th
2022	Porsche Carrera Cup Australia	Sonic Motor Racing Services	18	12	4	9	14	700	**2nd**
2022	Porsche Carrera Cup France	Martinet by Alméras	11	0	0	0	0	114	5th
2022	Porsche Supercup	Martinet by Alméras	2	0	0	0	0	0	NC†
2023	Super2 Series	Blanchard Racing Team	12	1	0	1	3	921	9th
2023	Supercars Championship	Blanchard Racing Team	2	0	0	0	0	162	49th
2023	S5000 Australian Drivers' Championship	88Racing	6	0	0	2	1	143	10th
2024	Supercars Championship	Blanchard Racing Team	24	0	0	0	0	1027	24th
2025	GT World Challenge Australia - Pro-Am	Arise Racing GT							
2025	Australian National Trans Am Series	Marcos Ambrose Motorsport	9	0	0	0	3	190	13th
2025	Porsche Carrera Cup Australia - Pro	McElrea Racing	3	1	0	0	2	0	NC†
2026	Porsche Carrera Cup Australia	TekworkX Motorsport	3	0	0	0	0	96*	6th*

† As Love was a guest driver, he was ineligible for points.

*Season in progress.

=== Complete Australian Formula 4 Championship results ===
(key) (Races in bold indicate pole position) (Races in italics indicate fastest lap)

Year	Team	1	2	3	4	5	6	7	8	9	10	11	12	13	14	15	16	17	18	19	20	21	DC	Points
2017	Team BRM	SAN1; 1; 7	SAN1; 2; 8	SAN1; 3; 8	SAN2; 1; 6	SAN2; 2; 10	SAN2; 3; 3	BAR; 1; 9	BAR; 2; 9	BAR; 3; 5	PHI; 1; 7	PHI; 2; 6	PHI; 3 Ret	QLD; 1; 8	QLD; 2; 9	QLD; 3; 8	SYD; 1; 9	SYD; 2 Ret	SYD; 3; 10	SUR; 1; 4	SUR; 2 Ret	SUR; 3; 5	9th	101
2018	Team BRM	SYM; 1; 3	SYM; 2; 3	SYM; 3; 4	PHI; 1; 3	PHI; 2; 3	PHI; 3; 3	QLD; 1; 3	QLD; 2; 3	QLD; 3; 3	WIN1; 1; 3	WIN1; 2; 6	WIN1; 3; 3	WIN2; 1; 5	WIN2; 2; 1	WIN2; 3; 4	SYD; 1; 2	SYD; 2; 2	SYD; 3; 3	PUK; 1; 3	PUK; 2; 4	PUK; 3; 4	3rd	307

=== Complete Porsche Supercup results ===
(key) (Races in bold indicate pole position) (Races in italics indicate fastest lap)

Year	Team	1	2	3	4	5	6	7	8	Pos.	Points
2022	Alméras Frères	IMO	MCO	SIL; 30	SPI	LEC; 19	SPA	ZAN	MNZ	NC†	0

† As Love was a guest driver, he was ineligible to score points.

==== Complete S5000 results ====
Year	Series	Team	1	2	3	4	5	6	7	8	9	10	11	12	13	14	15	16	17	18	Position	Points
2023	Australian	88Racing	SYM; R1	SYM; R2	SYM; R3	PHI; R4	PHI; R5	PHI; R6	WIN; R7	WIN; R8	WIN; R9	SMP; R10; 8	SMP; R11; 5	SMP; R12; 5	BEN; R13; 4	BEN; R14; 5	BEN; R15; 3	ADL; R16	ADL; R17	ADL; R18	10th	143

=== Super2 Series results ===
Super2 Series results
Year	Team	No.	Car	1	2	3	4	5	6	7	8	9	10	11	12	Pos.	Pts.
2023	Blanchard Racing Team	78	Ford Mustang S550	NEW; R1; 18	NEW; R2; 2	PER; R3; 6	PER; R4; 2	TOW; R5; 4	TOW; R6; Ret	SAN; R7; 15	SAN; R8; Ret	BAT; R9; 1	BAT; R10; DNS	ADE; R11; 11	ADE; R12; 8	9th	921

=== Supercars Championship results ===
Supercars results
Year	Team	No.	Car	1	2	3	4	5	6	7	8	9	10	11	12	13	14	15	16	17	18	19	20	21	22	23	24	25	26	27	28	29	30	31	32	33	34	Position	Points
2023	Blanchard Racing Team	7	Ford Mustang S650	NEW; R1	NEW; R2	MEL; R3	MEL; R4	MEL; R5	MEL; R6	BAR; R7	BAR; R8	BAR; R9	SYM; R10	SYM; R11	SYM; R12	HID; R13	HID; R14	HID; R15	TOW; R16	TOW; R17	SMP; R18	SMP; R19	BEN; R20	BEN; R21	BEN; R22	SAN; R23; 24	BAT; R24; 19	SUR; R25	SUR; R26	ADE; R27	ADE; R28							49th	162
2024	Blanchard Racing Team	3	Ford Mustang S650	BAT1; R1; Ret	BAT1; R2; 22	MEL; R3; 21	MEL; R4; 19	MEL; R5; 17	MEL; R6; 12	TAU; R7; 15	TAU; R8; 23	BAR; R9; 21	BAR; R10; 13	HID; R11; 19	HID; R12; 22	TOW; R13; 20	TOW; R14; 23	SMP; R15; 23	SMP; R16; 25	SYM; R17; 20	SYM; R18; 20	SAN; R19; 17	BAT; R20; 23	SUR; R21; 21	SUR; R22; 19	ADE; R23; 21	ADE; R24; 21											24th	1027
2025	Blanchard Racing Team	3	Ford Mustang S650	SYD; R1; 24	SYD; R2; 16	SYD; R3; 25	MEL; R4	MEL; R5	MEL; R6	MEL; R7	TAU; R8	TAU; R9	TAU; R10	SYM; R11	SYM; R12	SYM; R13	BAR; R14	BAR; R15	BAR; R16	HID; R17	HID; R18	HID; R19	TOW; R20	TOW; R21	TOW; R22	QLD; R23	QLD; R24	QLD; R25	BEN; R26	BAT; R27	SUR; R28	SUR; R29	SAN; R30	SAN; R31	ADE; R32	ADE; R33	ADE; R34	31st	59

=== Complete Bathurst 1000 results ===
Year	Team	Car	Co-driver	Position	Laps
2023	Blanchard Racing Team	Ford Mustang S650	(Australia) Jake Kostecki	19th	160
2024	Blanchard Racing Team	Ford Mustang S650	(Australia) Aaron Cameron	23rd	160

=== Complete Bathurst 12 Hour results ===
Year	Team	Co-drivers	Car	Class	Laps	Overall position	Class position
2019	Ginetta Australia	(Australia) Jimmy Vernon (Australia) Brad Schumacher (Australia) Karl Reindler	Ginetta G55 GT4	C	266	22nd	**3rd**
