= United Petroleum =

Australian petrol retailer and importer

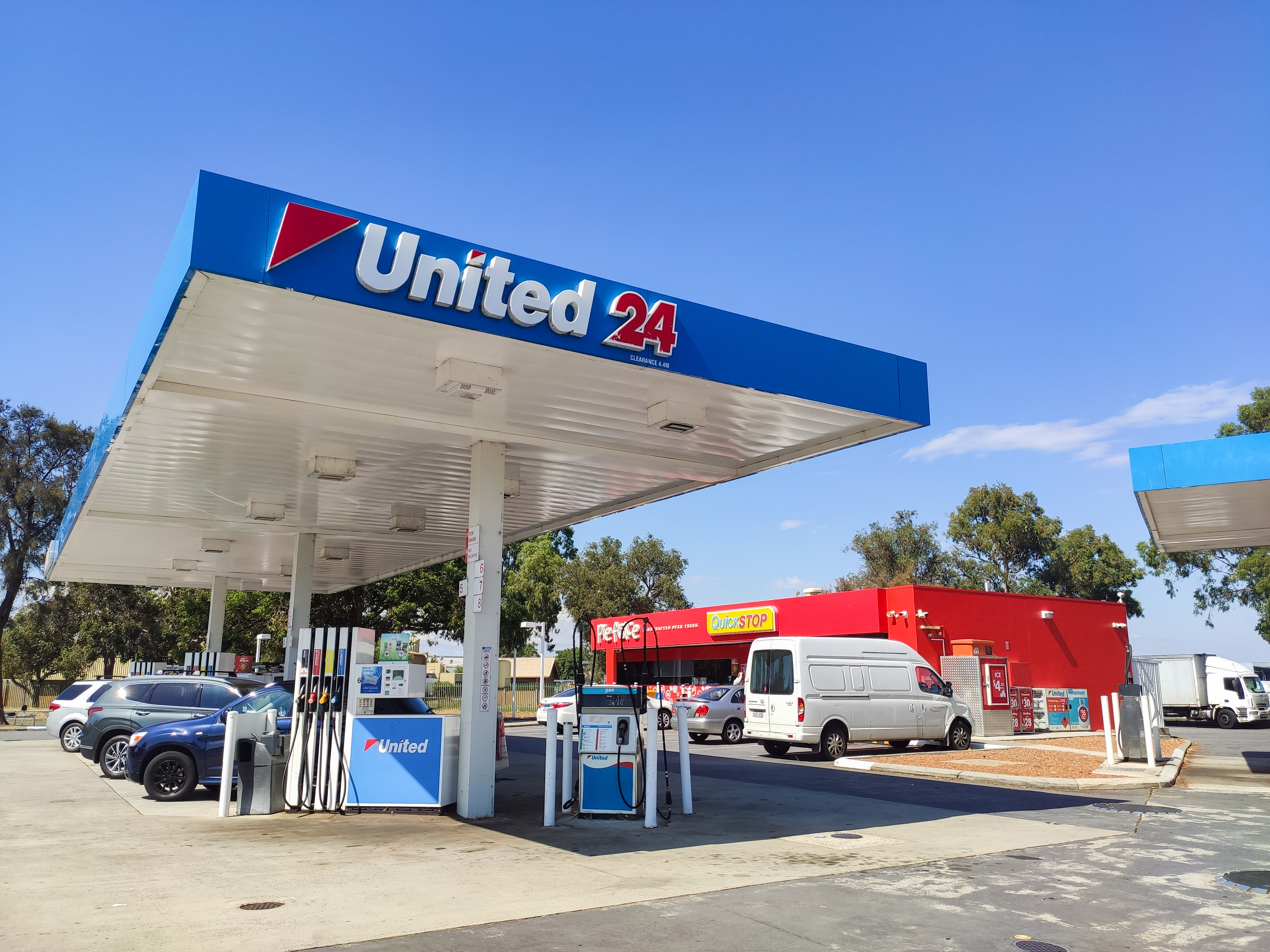
- United Petroleum station in Kewdale, Western Australia
- Type: Private
- Industry: Fuel retail and distribution
- Founded: 1993
- Founder: Avi Silver; Eddie Hirsch
- Headquarters: Hawthorn, Victoria, Australia
- Number of locations: 450+ sites (2020)
- Number of employees: 2500
- Subsidiaries: Pie Face
- Website: unitedpetroleum.com.au

United Petroleum is an Australian petrol retailer and importer. It was established in 1993 and, as of October 2020, has over 450 petrol stations in Australia. The company also owns Pie Face, a pie outlet it acquired in 2017 and subsequently rolled out to many of its service stations.

== History ==
United Petroleum's origins date back to 1981, when United's owners Avi Silver and Eddie Hirsch commenced operating service stations under the Astron banner in Victoria. Astron was closely associated with Esso. By 1990, the company had opened 23 new sites throughout Victoria.

United Petroleum was established in 1993, with the opening of a chain of service stations/convenience stores in South Australia. It expanded operations in Victoria, and over the next two years built networks in the Australian Capital Territory, New South Wales and Queensland. It later expanded into the Northern Territory, Tasmania and Western Australia.

In the mid 2000s, it acquired fuel import terminals in New South Wales, Northern Territory, Tasmania and Victoria. In 2011, United purchased an ethanol biorefinery in Dalby, Queensland.

In September 2015, ABC News after interviewing United Petroleum franchisees reported that staff at some locations were being underpaid. United rejected the allegations, saying "If any Franchisee is not paying award wages then the Franchisee would be clearly in breach of their Franchise Agreement with United". The Fair Work Ombudsman launched an investigation resulting in raids on 12 locations in 2017. The FWO found payroll compliance issues at five of the locations and a total of 46 employees were underpaid. Two locations entered enforceable undertakings with the regulator, two locations were issued compliance notices and three were issued letters of caution.

In September 2016, United Petroleum filed documents with the Australian Securities & Investments Commission to list the company on the Australian Securities Exchange. However the listing did not proceed, with United becoming involved in a legal dispute with advisors Herbert Smith Freehills. The case was dismissed in June 2018 with United ordered to pay HSF unpaid legal fees plus interest.

In April 2017, United Petroleum acquired Pie Face from receivership for an undisclosed sum. It subsequently sold Pie Face products at many of its United locations.

In 2021 a number of former franchisees sued the company for allegedly unfair termination.

In December 2022, United was fined $75,000 for dumping soil from a demolished petrol station site near the Noosa River in 2013.

=== Expansion into the Sri Lankan market ===
On 27 February 2024, United Petroleum announced the successful acquisition of a license to enter Sri Lanka's retail petroleum products market. To establish operations in the country, the Australian company incorporated United Petroleum Lanka Private Limited and signed an agreement with the Board of Investment (BoI) for a US$27.5 million investment in the importation, storage, and sale of petroleum products on 4 June 2024. United Petroleum Sri Lanka commenced its operations on 28 August 2024.

United Petroleum is reportedly planning to establish a food manufacturing venture in Sri Lanka under its Pie Face brand. The company intends to invest approximately US$20-30 million in this project, which will be managed by its wholly owned local subsidiary, United Petroleum Lanka Private Limited.

In January 2025, United Petroleum was reported to be considering an exit from the Sri Lankan retail fuel market, citing dissatisfaction with operational conditions and the market's limited size. The company's withdrawal was confirmed on 30 August 2025.

== Sponsorships ==
Between 2014 and 2016, United Petroleum was the official supplier of E85 fuel for the Supercars Championship, after which Shell took over the supply deal.

== See also ==
- List of automotive fuel retailers
- List of convenience stores
