= Pie Face =

Australian fast food chain

- Type: Subsidiary and franchise system
- Industry: Restaurant
- Founded: 2003; 23 years ago
- Key people: Nilan Jayasuriya, CEO
- Products: Coffee, pies and soft drinks
- Owner: United Petroleum (2017–present)
- Website: www.pieface.com.au

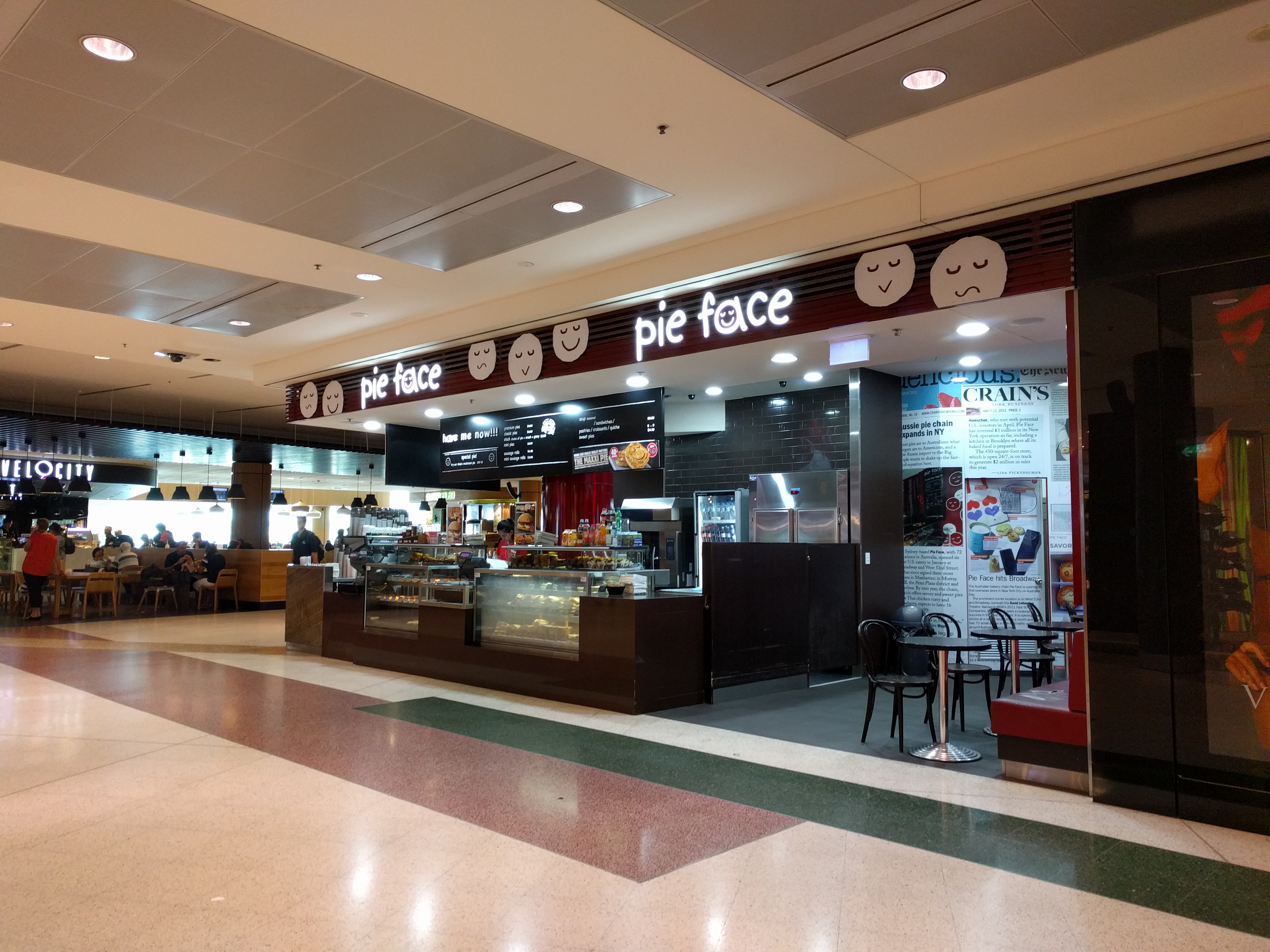
A Pie Face store at Sydney Airport in 2017

Pie Face is an Australian food chain which predominantly sells pies, sausage rolls and coffee. It was founded in 2003 in Sydney, Australia, by Wayne Homschek. Following a period of rapid growth in Australia and overseas, the company entered administration in 2014 and the majority of the chain's stores closed. In April 2017, it was acquired by United Petroleum. Between 2018 and 2020, Pie Face opened over 200 locations across Australia. As of December 2020, Pie Face operated 240 locations.

== History ==
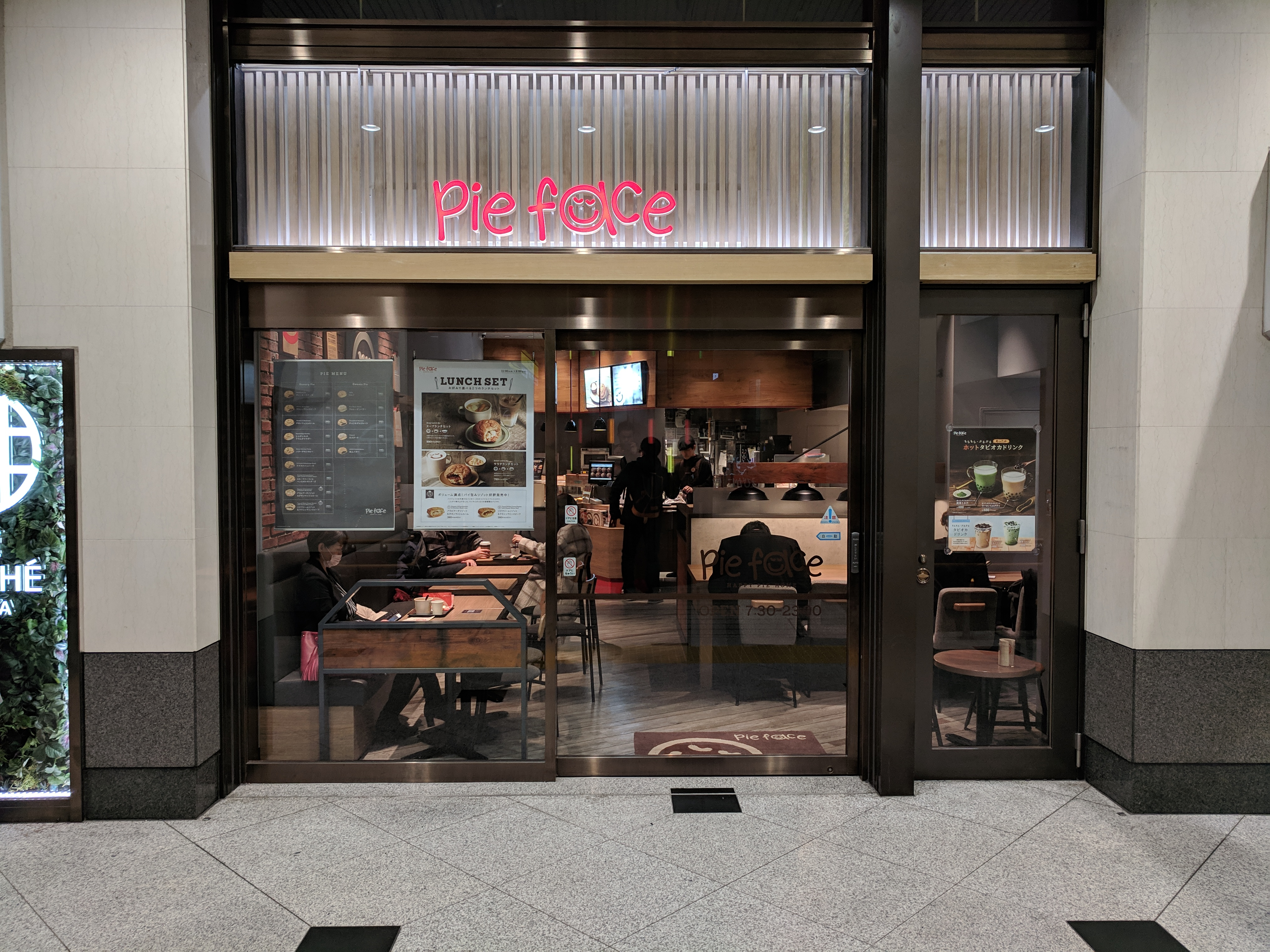
A Pie Face store at Osaka Station in 2019

Pie Face was established in 2003, and rapidly expanded. After opening a number of stores in Australia, it established stores in New York City during 2012 and New Zealand in late 2013. At its peak the chain had 80 stores in Australia and the United States, and planned to open a further 100 worldwide. Pie Face received $A35 million in funding, including from a number of high-profile investors who hoped that it would be eventually listed on the stock market.

In November 2014 Pie Face entered voluntary administration, facing legal action both in Australia and the US. Prior to entering administration it had been considering a stock market listing to be valued at $150 million, and had agreements to establish stores in Asia, Europe, the Middle East and the United States. The firm secured financing in December 2014, enabling it to continue trading. However, its focus was shifted mainly to wholesale and retail sales. Large numbers of company-owned and franchised stores closed as result, with the loss of hundreds of jobs.

Pie Face went in receivership again in late 2016, and closed eleven company-owned stores. As at 24 November 2016 approximately 26 franchised stores remained open.

In January 2017 it was reported that the chain was nearing profitability, and now had 30 franchised stores and intended to expand overseas again with a focus on Japan and South Korea. However, it continued to have debts of $9 million, including $1 million owed to staff, and was facing a motion to be wound up for unpaid debts. At this time its receivers told the media that unsecured creditors were unlikely to receive any funds, but they believed the business had significant "growth potential, if properly managed" and seven or eight companies were considering purchasing the chain. All the New Zealand outlets had closed by the end of 2017.

In April 2017, it was acquired by United Petroleum for an undisclosed sum. United subsequently sold Pie Face products at many of its petrol station locations.

In 2020 it was revealed the company were selling items labelled as halal, which were in fact, not halal.

In 2024 it was reported that Pie Face, along with its parent company United Petroleum, was planning to establish a food manufacturing venture in Sri Lanka. The company intended to invest approximately US$20–30 million in the project, which would be managed by United's wholly owned local subsidiary, United Petroleum Lanka Private Limited. However United Petroleum would later withdraw from the Sri Lankan market in August 2025.

== See also ==
- Australian meat pie
