= 2016 Shannons Nationals Motor Racing Championships season =

Australian motor racing season

The 2016 Shannons Nationals Motor Racing Championships season is the eleventh running of the Shannons Nationals Motor Racing Championships. The season started on 1 April at Sandown Raceway and will finish on 13 November at Sydney Motorsport Park.

Twelve different series will be a part of the Championships in 2016: the Australian Endurance Championship, Australian GT Trophy Series, Touring Car Masters, Porsche GT3 Cup Challenge Australia, Kumho Tyres V8 Touring Cars, Kerrick Sports Sedan Series, Radical Australia Cup, Australian Formula 3 Championship, Australian Formula 4 Championship, Australian Formula Ford Series, Australian Production Car Series, Australian Superkart Championship and Australian Sports Racer Series.

== Calendar ==
Round	Circuit	City / State	Date	Series	Winner
1	(Victoria (state)) Sandown Raceway	Melbourne, Victoria	1–3 April	Australian Formula 3 Championship	(Australia) Tim Macrow
1	(Victoria (state)) Sandown Raceway	Melbourne, Victoria	1–3 April	Australian Formula Ford Series	(Australia) Leanne Tander
1	(Victoria (state)) Sandown Raceway	Melbourne, Victoria	1–3 April	Australian GT Trophy Series	(Australia) Greg Taylor (Australia) Barton Mawer
1	(Victoria (state)) Sandown Raceway	Melbourne, Victoria	1–3 April	Kerrick Sports Sedans Series	(Australia) Jack Perkins
1	(Victoria (state)) Sandown Raceway	Melbourne, Victoria	1–3 April	Kumho Tyres V8 Touring Car Series	(Australia) Taz Douglas
1	(Victoria (state)) Sandown Raceway	Melbourne, Victoria	1–3 April	Porsche GT3 Cup Challenge	(Australia) Ryan Simpson
1	(Victoria (state)) Sandown Raceway	Melbourne, Victoria	1–3 April	Sports Racer Series	(Australia) Joshua Townsend
1	(Victoria (state)) Sandown Raceway	Melbourne, Victoria	1–3 April	Touring Car Masters	(Australia) John Bowe
2	(Victoria (state)) Phillip Island Grand Prix Circuit	Phillip Island, Victoria	27–29 May	Australian Endurance Championship	(Australia) Nathan Morcom (Australia) Grant Denyer
2	(Victoria (state)) Phillip Island Grand Prix Circuit	Phillip Island, Victoria	27–29 May	Australian Formula 3 Championship	(Australia) Tim Macrow
2	(Victoria (state)) Phillip Island Grand Prix Circuit	Phillip Island, Victoria	27–29 May	Australian GT Trophy Series	(Australia) Yasser Shahin
2	(Victoria (state)) Phillip Island Grand Prix Circuit	Phillip Island, Victoria	27–29 May	Australian Production Car Series	
2	(Victoria (state)) Phillip Island Grand Prix Circuit	Phillip Island, Victoria	27–29 May	Radical Australia Cup	
3	(Victoria (state)) Winton Motor Raceway	Benalla, Victoria	10–12 June	Australian Formula 3 Championship	(Australia) Tim Macrow
3	(Victoria (state)) Winton Motor Raceway	Benalla, Victoria	10–12 June	Australian GT Trophy Series	
3	(Victoria (state)) Winton Motor Raceway	Benalla, Victoria	10–12 June	Kerrick Sports Sedans Series	(Australia) Tony Ricciardello
3	(Victoria (state)) Winton Motor Raceway	Benalla, Victoria	10–12 June	Porsche GT3 Cup Challenge	(Australia) Hamish Hardman
3	(Victoria (state)) Winton Motor Raceway	Benalla, Victoria	10–12 June	Sports Racer Series	(Australia) Roger I'Anson
4	(New South Wales) Sydney Motorsport Park	Sydney, New South Wales	1–3 July	Australian Formula 3 Championship	
4	(New South Wales) Sydney Motorsport Park	Sydney, New South Wales	1–3 July	Australian GT Trophy Series	
4	(New South Wales) Sydney Motorsport Park	Sydney, New South Wales	1–3 July	CAMS Jayco Australian Formula 4 Championship	
4	(New South Wales) Sydney Motorsport Park	Sydney, New South Wales	1–3 July	Porsche GT3 Cup Challenge	
4	(New South Wales) Sydney Motorsport Park	Sydney, New South Wales	1–3 July	Australian Production Car Series	
4	(New South Wales) Sydney Motorsport Park	Sydney, New South Wales	1–3 July	Radical Australia Cup	
5	Queensland Raceway	Ipswich, Queensland	29–31 July	Australian Formula 3 Championship	
5	Queensland Raceway	Ipswich, Queensland	29–31 July	Australian Formula Ford Series	
5	Queensland Raceway	Ipswich, Queensland	29–31 July	Australian GT Trophy Series	
5	Queensland Raceway	Ipswich, Queensland	29–31 July	Kerrick Sports Sedans	
5	Queensland Raceway	Ipswich, Queensland	29–31 July	Porsche GT3 Cup Challenge	
5	Queensland Raceway	Ipswich, Queensland	29–31 July	Australian Production Car Series	
5	Queensland Raceway	Ipswich, Queensland	29–31 July	Sports Racers	
6	(Victoria (state)) Phillip Island Grand Prix Circuit	Phillip Island, Victoria	9–11 September	Australian Formula 3 Championship	
6	(Victoria (state)) Phillip Island Grand Prix Circuit	Phillip Island, Victoria	9–11 September	Australian GT Trophy Series	
6	(Victoria (state)) Phillip Island Grand Prix Circuit	Phillip Island, Victoria	9–11 September	Kerrick Sports Sedans Series	
6	(Victoria (state)) Phillip Island Grand Prix Circuit	Phillip Island, Victoria	9–11 September	Kumho Tyres V8 Touring Car Series	
6	(Victoria (state)) Phillip Island Grand Prix Circuit	Phillip Island, Victoria	9–11 September	Porsche GT3 Cup Challenge	
6	(Victoria (state)) Phillip Island Grand Prix Circuit	Phillip Island, Victoria	9–11 September	Sports Racer Series	
6	(Victoria (state)) Phillip Island Grand Prix Circuit	Phillip Island, Victoria	9–11 September	Australian Superkart Championship	
6	(Victoria (state)) Phillip Island Grand Prix Circuit	Phillip Island, Victoria	9–11 September	Touring Car Masters	
7	(New South Wales) Sydney Motorsport Park	Sydney, New South Wales	11–13 November	Australian Formula 3 Championship	
7	(New South Wales) Sydney Motorsport Park	Sydney, New South Wales	11–13 November	Australian Production Car Series	
7	(New South Wales) Sydney Motorsport Park	Sydney, New South Wales	11–13 November	Kerrick Sports Sedans Series	
7	(New South Wales) Sydney Motorsport Park	Sydney, New South Wales	11–13 November	Sports Racer Series	
7	(New South Wales) Sydney Motorsport Park	Sydney, New South Wales	11–13 November	Australian Superkart Championship	
