= 2016 Shannons Nationals Motor Racing Sandown Round =

The 2016 Shannons Nationals Motor Racing Round 1 was held at Sandown Raceway on April 1–3, 2016. It included Australian GT, Australian Formula 3, Australian Formula Ford, Kerrick Sports Sedans, Kumho V8 Touring Cars, Porsche GT3 Cup, Sports Racers and Touring Car Masters.

== Results ==
=== Australian GT Championship ===
==== Qualifying ====
Pos.	No.	Driver	Car	Team	Time	Gap
1	66	(Australia) Garth Rainsbury	Dodge Viper	Melbourne Performance Centre	1:11.035	-
2	1	(Australia) Greg Taylor	Audi R8 LMS 2011	Adina Apartment Hotels	1:11.0576	+0.022
3	94	(Australia) Morgan Haber	MARC Mazda 3	MARC Cars Australia	1:11.973	+0.938
4	93	(Australia) Jake Camilleri	MARC Mazda 3	MARC Cars Australia	1:12.008	+0.973
5	77	(Australia) Jan Jinadasa	Lamborghini LP560 GT3	JJA Consulting Group	1:12.055	+1.019
6	9	(Australia) Mathew Turnbull	Lamborghini LP560 GT3	Fire Rating Solutions	1:12.364	+1.328
7	57	(Australia) Rob Smith	Audi R8 LMS 2011	Southern Star Developments	1:12.984	+1.948
8	60	(Australia) Jed Wallis	Porsche 997 GT3 Cup	Warrin Mining Volvo	1:13.447	+2.412
9	33	(Australia) Scott Hookey	Ferrari 458 GT3	Exotic Track Days	1:14.210	+3.174
10	92	(Australia) Michael Benton	MARC Focus	MARC Cars Australia	1:14.232	+3.197
11	31	(Australia) Francis Placentino	Lamborghini Gallardo	Tusk Windsor	1:16.121	+5.086
12	95	(Australia) Geoff Taunton	MARC Focus	MARC Cars Australia	1:16.184	+5.148
13	29	(Australia) Jim Manolios	Maserati Trofeo	Trofeo Motorsport	1:16.529	+5.493
14	54	(Australia) Tony Alford	MARC Focus	MARC Cars Australia	1:17.087	+6.051
15	12	(Australia) Brendan Cook	Porsche 997 GT3 Cup	KPH Racing	1:17.188	+6.153
16	72	(Australia) Con Whitlock	Audi R8 LMS 2011	Whitlock Bull Bars	1:19.861	+8.825

==== Race 1 ====
Pos.	No.	Driver/s	Car	Team	Laps	Time/Retired	Grid
1	1	(Australia) Greg Taylor (Australia) Barton Mawer	Audi R8 LMS 2011	Adina Apartment Hotels	40	51:10.196	2
2	93	(Australia) Jake Camilleri	MARC Mazda 3	MARC Cars Australia	40	+3.021	4
3	57	(Australia) Rob Smith	Audi R8 LMS 2011	Southern Star Developments	40	+25.441	7
4	66	(Australia) Garth Rainsbury (Australia) Ben Potter	Dodge Viper	Melbourne Performance Centre	40	+1:11.177	1
5	92	(Australia) Michael Benton (Australia) Bruce Williams	MARC Focus	MARC Cars Australia	39	+1 Lap	10
6	54	(Australia) Tony Alford	MARC Focus	MARC Cars Australia	39	+1 Lap	14
7	94	(Australia) Morgan Haber (Australia) Jimmy Vernon	MARC Mazda 3	MARC Cars Australia	39	+1 Lap	3
8	33	(Australia) Scott Hookey	Ferrari 458 GT3	Exotic Track Days	39	+1 Lap	9
9	60	(Australia) Jed Wallis (Australia) Adam Wallis	Porsche 997 GT3 Cup	Warrin Mining Volvo	39	+1 Lap	8
10	77	(Australia) Jan Jinadasa	Lamborghini LP560 GT3	JJA Consulting Group	39	+1 Lap	5
11	95	(Australia) Geoff Taunton (Australia) Sam Gerrard	MARC Focus	MARC Cars Australia	38	+2 Laps	12
12	72	(Australia) Con Whitlock	Audi R8 LMS 2011	Whitlock Bull Bars	37	+3 Laps	16
13	12	(Australia) Brendan Cook (Australia) Ockert Fourie	Porsche 997 GT3 Cup	KPH Racing	34	+6 Laps	15
DNF	31	(Australia) Francis Placentino	Lamborghini Gallardo	Tusk Windsor	29	Mechanical	11
DNF	9	(Australia) Mathew Turnbull	Lamborghini LP560 GT3	Fire Rating Solutions	19	Collision Damage	6
DNF	29	(Australia) Jim Manolios	Maserati Trofeo	Trofeo Motorsport	17	Engine	13

Fastest Lap: 1:10.136 - Greg Taylor (Audi R8 LMS 2011)

==== Race 2 ====
Pos.	No.	Driver	Car	Team	Laps	Time/Retired	Grid
1	1	(Australia) Greg Taylor (Australia) Barton Mawer	Audi R8 LMS 2011	Adina Apartment Hotels	38	50:29.909	1
2	93	(Australia) Jake Camilleri	MARC Mazda 3	MARC Cars Australia	38	+20.422	2
3	9	(Australia) Mathew Turnbull	Lamborghini LP560 GT3	Fire Rating Solutions	38	+21.711	12
4	57	(Australia) Rob Smith	Audi R8 LMS 2011	Southern Star Developments	38	+22.406	3
5	94	(Australia) Morgan Haber (Australia) Jimmy Vernon	MARC Mazda 3	MARC Cars Australia	38	+25.837	6
6	33	(Australia) Scott Hookey	Ferrari 458 GT3	Exotic Track Days	38	+48.072	7
7	95	(Australia) Geoff Taunton (Australia) Sam Gerrard	MARC Focus	MARC Cars Australia	38	+1:09.556	10
8	77	(Australia) Jan Jinadasa	Lamborghini LP560 GT3	JJA Consulting Group	38	+1:12.728	9
9	92	(Australia) Michael Benton (Australia) Bruce Williams	MARC Focus	MARC Cars Australia	37	+1 Lap	4
10	60	(Australia) Jed Wallis (Australia) Adam Wallis	Porsche 997 GT3 Cup	Warrin Mining Volvo	36	+2 Lap	8
11	72	(Australia) Con Whitlock	Audi R8 LMS 2011	Whitlock Bull Bars	36	+2 Laps	11
12	54	(Australia) Tony Alford	MARC Focus	MARC Cars Australia	34	+4 Lap	5
DNF	12	(Australia) Brendan Cook (Australia) Ockert Fourie	Porsche 997 GT3 Cup	KPH Racing	32	Spun Off	13
DNS	66	(Australia) Garth Rainsbury (Australia) Ben Potter	Dodge Viper	Melbourne Performance Centre	0	Gearbox	
DNS	31	(Australia) Francis Placentino	Lamborghini Gallardo	Tusk Windsor	0	Mechanical	
DNS	29	(Australia) Jim Manolios	Maserati Trofeo	Trofeo Motorsport	0	Engine	

Fastest Lap: 1:10.465 - Greg Taylor (Audi R8 LMS 2011)

=== Australian Formula 3 Championship ===
==== Qualifying ====
Pos.	No.	Driver	Car	Team	Time	Gap
1	88	(Australia) Tim Macrow	Dallara F307 HWA-Mercedes-Benz	Alpine Motorsports	1:19.360	-
2	17	(Australia) Christopher Anthony	Dallara F308 HWA-Mercedes-Benz	Gilmour Racing	1:21.354	+1.993
3	73	(Australia) Cameron Shields	Dallara F306 HWA-Mercedes-Benz	Gilmour Racing	1:21.884	+2.523
4	3	(Australia) Trent Shirvington	Mygale M11 HWA-Mercedes-Benz	TEAM BRM	1:24.882	+5.521
5	8	(Australia) Roland Legge	Dallara F308 HWA-Mercedes-Benz	R-TEK Motorsport	1:24.929	+10.099
6		(Australia) Nathan Kumar	Dallara F307 Spiess Opel	R-TEK Motorsport	1:29.460	+10.099
7	81	(Australia) Ross McAlpine	Dallara F302 Renault Sodemo	Ross McAlpine	1:31.028	+11.667

==== Race 1 ====
Pos.	No.	Driver	Car	Team	Laps	Time/Retired	Grid
1	88	(Australia) Tim Macrow	Dallara F307 HWA-Mercedes-Benz	Alpine Motorsports	12	16:29.073	1
2	17	(Australia) Christopher Anthony	Dallara F308 HWA-Mercedes-Benz	Gilmour Racing	12	+1.413	2
3	3	(Australia) Trent Shirvington	Mygale M11 HWA-Mercedes-Benz	TEAM BRM	12	+27.317	4
4		(Australia) Nathan Kumar	Dallara F307 Spiess Opel	R-TEK Motorsport	12	+34.311	6
5	81	(Australia) Ross McAlpine	Dallara F302 Renault Sodemo	Ross McAlpine	12	+1:09.726	7
DNF	8	(Australia) Roland Legge	Dallara F308 HWA-Mercedes-Benz	R-TEK Motorsport	2		5
DNF	73	(Australia) Cameron Shields	Dallara F306 HWA-Mercedes-Benz	Gilmour Racing	0		3

Fastest Lap: 1:07.658 - Tim Macrow (Dallara F307 HWA-Mercedes-Benz)

==== Race 2 ====
Pos.	No.	Driver	Car	Team	Laps	Time/Retired	Grid
1	17	(Australia) Christopher Anthony	Dallara F308 HWA-Mercedes-Benz	Gilmour Racing	12	13:46.673	2
2	88	(Australia) Tim Macrow	Dallara F307 HWA-Mercedes-Benz	Alpine Motorsports	12	+0.419	1
3	8	(Australia) Roland Legge	Dallara F308 HWA-Mercedes-Benz	R-TEK Motorsport	12	+0.755	5
4	73	(Australia) Cameron Shields	Dallara F306 HWA-Mercedes-Benz	Gilmour Racing	12	+20.311	3
5	3	(Australia) Trent Shirvington	Mygale M11 HWA-Mercedes-Benz	TEAM BRM	12	+25.474	4
6		(Australia) Nathan Kumar	Dallara F307 Spiess Opel	R-TEK Motorsport	12	+39.557	6
7	81	(Australia) Ross McAlpine	Dallara F302 Renault Sodemo	Ross McAlpine	11	+1 Lap	7

Fastest Lap: 1:07.810 - Roland Legge (Dallara F308 HWA-Mercedes-Benz)

==== Race 3 ====
Pos.	No.	Driver	Car	Team	Laps	Time/Retired	Grid
1	88	(Australia) Tim Macrow	Dallara F307 HWA-Mercedes-Benz	Alpine Motorsports	15	18:31.543	1
2	17	(Australia) Christopher Anthony	Dallara F308 HWA-Mercedes-Benz	Gilmour Racing	15	+0.924	2
3	73	(Australia) Cameron Shields	Dallara F306 HWA-Mercedes-Benz	Gilmour Racing	15	+13.696	3
4	3	(Australia) Trent Shirvington	Mygale M11 HWA-Mercedes-Benz	TEAM BRM	15	+17.800	4
5		(Australia) Nathan Kumar	Dallara F307 Spiess Opel	R-TEK Motorsport	15	+24.268	6
6	81	(Australia) Ross McAlpine	Dallara F302 Renault Sodemo	Ross McAlpine	15	+54.474	7
7	8	(Australia) Roland Legge	Dallara F308 HWA-Mercedes-Benz	R-TEK Motorsport	15	+1 Lap	5

Fastest Lap: 1:07.631 - Christopher Anthony (Dallara F308 HWA-Mercedes-Benz)
