= 2016 Sports Racer Series =

The 2016 Sport Racer Series is an Australian motor racing competition sanctioned by the Confederation of Australian Motorsport for prototype sports cars. The series is made up of three classes, Sport Racer, Formula 1000 and Radical/Supersports.

== Team and drivers ==
Team	Car	Class	No.	Drivers	Rounds
Taylor Collision/Laucke Flour Mills	West WX10RS	SR1	1	(Australia) Mark Laucke	3
Taylor Collision/Laucke Flour Mills	West WR1000	SR1	1	(Australia) Mark Laucke	4
Taylor Collision/Laucke Flour Mills	West WR1000	SR2	33	(Australia) Michael Whiting	1,3
Taylor Collision/Laucke Flour Mills	West WX10RS	SR1	55	(Australia) Mark Laucke	1-2
West Race Cars; Marina Mirage	RFR F1000	F1K	2	(Australia) Aaron Steer	1
West Race Cars; Marina Mirage	RFR F1000	F1K	2	(Australia) Greg Steer	2-4
West Race Cars; Marina Mirage	RFR F1000	F1K	5	(Australia) Joshua Cranston	1
West Race Cars; Marina Mirage	West LMP4	SR1	27	(Australia) Aaron Steer	2,4
West Race Cars; Marina Mirage	West LMP4	SR1	27	(Australia) John-Paul Drake	3
West Race Cars; Marina Mirage	West WX10	SR1	44	(Australia) Jason Makris	1-3
West Race Cars; Marina Mirage	West WR1000	SR2	56	(Australia) Adam Cranston	1-3
West Race Cars; Marina Mirage	West WX10	SR2	66	(Australia) John-Paul Drake	1-2
West Race Cars; Marina Mirage	West WR1000	SR2	66	(Australia) John-Paul Drake	4
Vantage Freight Services	Radical SR3	RAD	3	(Australia) David Crampton	1,4
Orlando Phoenix	RFR F1000	F1K	4	(Australia) Terry Peovitis	1-4
Aventis Racing	RFR F1000	F1K	5	(Australia) Josh Cranston	2-4
DSR Downunder	Nova Race LSR F1000	F1K	9	(Australia) Joshua Townsend	1,3
Driving Events	Radical SR3	RAD	10	(Australia) Grant Green	3
Ken's Exhaust Systems Berri; Rivergraphics	West WR 1000	SR1	14	(Australia) Roger I'Anson	1-4
Motorsport Leasing P/L	Radical SR3	RAD	15	(New Zealand) Rob Knight	1
Motorsport Leasing P/L	Radical SR3	RAD	34	(Australia) John Morriss	1-4
MSR Motorsport Fabrication	Prince LSR	SR2	16	(Australia) Mark Short	1
PJS Air	Radical SR3	RAD	17	(Australia) Peter Johnston	1-4
Hughes Motorsport/Pro Vinyl	Radical SR3	RAD	32	(Australia) Sue Hughes	2-3
Sutto's Motorcycle Supply	Radical SR3	RAD	35	(Australia) Chris Sutton	1-2
Hughes Supercar Services	Radical SR3	RAD	42	(Australia) Philip Hughes	2,4
Bryan Stoeckel	West WR1000	SR2	53	(Australia) Jonathan Stoeckel	1,4

== Race calendar ==
The series is being contested over five rounds, each consisting of three races.

Round	Circuit	City / state	Date	Round winner
1	(Victoria (state)) Sandown Raceway	Melbourne, Victoria	1–3 April	(Australia) Joshua Townsend
2	(Victoria (state)) Winton Raceway	Winton, Victoria	10–12 June	(Australia) Roger I'Anson
3	Queensland Raceway	Ipswich, Queensland	29–31 July	(Australia) Roger I'Anson
4	(Victoria (state)) Phillip Island Grand Prix Circuit	Phillip Island, Victoria	9–11 September	(Australia) Aaron Steer
5	(New South Wales) Sydney Motorsport Park	Sydney, New South Wales	11–13 November	

== Series standings ==
Pos.	Driver	SAN (Victoria (state))			WIN (Victoria (state))			QLD (Queensland)			PHI (Victoria (state))			SMP (New South Wales)			Pts.
1	Roger I'Anson	Ret	1	1	1	1	1	1	1	1	1	1	Ret	2	1	1	501
2	Peter Johnston	7	9	5	5	5	6	6	5	7	3	6	10	4	6	5	398
3	Josh Cranston	4	4	12	11	9	8	7	4	2	Ret	4	Ret	3	2	3	397
4	Mark Laucke	5	Ret	8	6	3	Ret	9	Ret	6	7	3	2	1	8	2	377
5	Terry Peovitis	13	10	9	10	8	9	13	8	4	8	8	5	5	4	4	376
6	John-Paul Drake	Ret	7	7	4	11	5	5	6	8	5	5	3	10	Ret	DNS	331
7	John Morriss	3	Ret	DNS	7	6	4	4	2	5	4	7	4				315
8	Greg Steer				13	14	12	11	9	9	9	11	8	9	7	7	313
9	Jason Makris	1	3	4	3	12	11	8	3	3							279
10	Aaron Steer	6	DNS	DNS	2	2	2				2	2	1				243
11	Philip Hughes				9	10	10				DNS	9	6	8	3	6	227
12	Adam Cranston	Ret	Ret	DNS	14	4	3	3	Ret	DNS				7	Ret	8	177
13	Chris Sutton	12	8	6	8	7	7										168
14	David Crampton	8	11	10							6	10	7				164
15	Joshua Townsend	2	2	2				2	Ret	DNS							140
16	Jonathan Stoeckel	9	6	Ret							Ret	12	9				108
17	Mark Short	10	5	3													90
18	Grant Green							12	7	10							80
19	Rob Knight	11	12	13													72
20	Sue Hughes				12	13	13	Ret	DNS	DNS							70
21	Michael Whiting	Ret	Ret	11				10	Ret	DNS							51
22	Glenn Cooper													6	5	Ret	31
-	Gerrit Ruff	DNS	DNS	DNS													0
