= Michael Cranston =

Australian public servant

Deputy Commissioner of Taxation
- In office 2015 – 13 June 2017

Personal details
- Occupation: Public servant

Michael Cranston is a former Australian public servant who was a deputy commissioner of the Australian Taxation Office (ATO).

== Former Deputy Commissioner ==
Michael Cranston was an ATO employee for over 40 years, the last period as Deputy Commissioner for Private Groups and High Wealth Individuals. In the role he was responsible for tax compliance of private group businesses and High Wealth Individuals. He was also responsible for tax crime including offshore tax evasion, dealing with Project Wickenby and the Panama Papers. Cranston worked on and chaired the OECD Taskforce on Tax Crimes in Paris from 2012 to 2017.

== Tax raids ==
During 2015, Cranston was the Deputy Commissioner at the time of a major operation which led to 100 tax officers raiding the Sydney premises of 12 firms, including lawyers, accountants and liquidators. Cranston was not directly involved in the operation. The 12 firms were suspected of involvement in phoenix operations, whereby companies run up tax liabilities, fail to pay the tax liabilities, and money or assets disappear or are stripped from the companies before the companies are deliberately bankrupted by the proprietors. The same proprietors then establish new but similar companies, and the whole process is repeated, systematically. The bankrupted companies are liquidated, with the intention of leaving creditors and the tax office empty-handed or short-changed.

== Plutus Payroll tax fraud ==
In 2017, it emerged that members of Cranston's family, specifically his son Adam and daughter Lauren, were alleged to be central characters in one of Australia's larger tax frauds involving phoenixing. The estimated amount of money involved in the fraud, according to the investigating authorities, was about $105 million. Parts of the evidence were gathered using phone taps of conversations between the various suspects and phone conversations between two members of the Cranston family.

In May 2017, the police were of the opinion that Cranston was not part of the conspiracy, and that Cranston was unaware of the fraud, though Cranston did access restricted information. Later in 2017, Cranston resigned from the ATO after he was formally charged with abusing his position as a public servant. Cranston's trial was conducted in January and February 2019. On 15 February 2019, after nearly three weeks on trial before NSW District Court judge Robyn Tupman, a jury took less than six hours deliberation to find the 40-year ATO veteran not guilty of dishonestly obtaining information in his capacity as a senior public servant to benefit Adam Cranston, as well as a charge of using his influence to improperly obtain a benefit for his son.

On 7 March 2023, at the conclusion of a nine month trial, the court found Adam Cranston, Dev Menon, and Jason Oxley guilty of taking part in a $105 million tax fraud. On 13 March 2023, a fourth accused, Lauren Cranston, was found guilty of conspiring to cause a loss to the Commonwealth Government and conspiring to deal with more than $1 million while believing it to be the proceeds of crime. Previously, but under seal, Sydney lawyer Sevag Chalabian was convicted and jailed for blackmail offences committed by him against participants in the Plutus Payroll tax frauds. The conviction was unsealed after the convictions of the Cranstons, Dev Menon, and Jason Onley were decided.

Between 2018 and 2023 crime journalist Steve Barrett was accused of being one of three people attempting to extort $5 million from the Plutus Payroll fraud perpetrators. After Mr Barrett's first trial resulted in a hung jury, charges against Mr Barrett were dropped before an abortive second trial commenced, due to a direction to the judge from the Commonwealth Director of Public Prosecutions. By 2024, Barrett applied to the NSW Supreme Court seeking cost orders towards some of the $500,000 in legal fees he incurred defending himself. On April 24, 2024 Justice Natalie Adams denied Barrett's application.

== Waterhouse Lawyers ==
Cranston is a partner at Waterhouse Tax Lawyers. The firm specialises in providing tax advice and assistance to individuals and businesses. It has a strong focus in dealing with the Australian Taxation Office in relation to debt and audit dispute matters.
