= 2016 Porsche GT3 Cup Challenge Australia =

Motor racing competition

Seasons
- ← 2015 2017 →

The 2016 Porsche GT3 Cup Challenge Australia Series presented by Pirelli was the ninth running of Porsche GT3 Cup Challenge Australia. The series commenced at Sandown Raceway on April 1st & concluded at the Phillip Island Grand Prix Circuit on September 11th.

The series would be won by Hamish Hardeman.

== Team and drivers ==
Team	Class	No.	Driver	Rounds
Sonic Motor Racing Services	A	1	(Australia) Ryan Simpson	1
Sonic Motor Racing Services	A	10	(Australia) Hamish Hardeman	All
CSF Radiators/Miles Advisory Partners	A	4	(New Zealand) Tim Miles	All
Logicar Australia	A	6	(Australia) Michael Stillwell	2-3,6
Asset Partner/Racing Dynamic	B	8	(Australia) Neville Stewart	2,4
Triffle Bar + Venue	A	9	(Australia) Tony Martin	1-2,4-6
OLOF/Cosmetic Dental Spa	B	12	(Australia) Brendon Cook	5-6
htfu	A	13	(Australia) Sam Shahin	All
Chris Stillwell	A	16	(Australia) Chris Stillwell	3
Zoo York	A	17	(Australia) Michael Vati	1
Hallmark Homes/Motiv8 Racing; Movie 8 Racing	A	19	(Australia) Anthony Gilbertson	All
Melbourne Orthopaedic Group	B	21	(Australia) Shane Barwood	1,3-6
Wrightlands GAM Soltronic	A	30	(Australia) David Ryan	1-4
FREEM	B	32	(Australia) Daniel Stutterd	1-3,5
Motorsport Leasing	A	34	(Australia) Phil Morriss	1
Motorsport Leasing	A	34	(Australia) John Morriss	2,4-5
GAP Solutions / Ezi-POS	A	66	(Australia) John Goodacre	1
Safe-T-Stop	B	69	(Australia) Richard Gartner	2
Power Street Racing	A	72	(Australia) Jim Campbell	2-5
Hunter French Real Estate	B	81	(Australia) Michael Tsigeridis	1,3,6
Laser 3D/Force Accessories	A	82	(Australia) Brian Finn	All
Kalus Kenny Itelex Lawyers	A	90	(Australia) Sven Burchartz	6
Simulate-It/Willship	A	91	(New Zealand) Jaxon Evans	All
Super Rooster; Scott Taylor Motorsport	A	95	(Australia) Jake Klarich	All
Super Rooster; Scott Taylor Motorsport	B	222	(Australia) Scott Taylor	5
Southern Star Window	A	99	(Australia) Ross McGregor	All

All A class teams used Porsche 911 GT3 Cup Type 997 (MY2010-2012) all B class team used Porsche 911 GT3 Cup Type 997 (MY2006-2009). They all used Pirelli Tyres.

== Race calendar ==
The series is being contested over eight rounds with rounds 3 & 4 being part of the Jim Richards Endurance Trophy.

Round	Circuit	City / state	Date	Format	Winning driver(s)
1	(Victoria (state)) Sandown Raceway	Melbourne, Victoria	1–3 April	Three races	(Australia) Ryan Simpson
2	(New South Wales) Sydney Motorsport Park	Sydney, New South Wales	29 April-1 May	Three races	(New Zealand) Jaxon Evans
3	(Victoria (state)) Winton Motor Raceway	Winton, Victoria	10–12 June	Three races	(Australia) Hamish Hardeman
4	(New South Wales) Sydney Motorsport Park	Sydney, New South Wales	1–3 July	Three races	(Australia) Hamish Hardeman
5	Queensland Raceway	Ipswich, Queensland	29–31 July	Three races	(New Zealand) Jaxon Evans
6	(Victoria (state)) Phillip Island Grand Prix Circuit	Phillip Island, Victoria	9–11 September	Three races	(New Zealand) Jaxon Evans

== Series standings ==
Pos.	Driver	SAN (Victoria (state))			SMP (New South Wales)			WIN (Victoria (state))			SMP (New South Wales)			QLD (Queensland)			PHI (Victoria (state))			Pts.
1	Hamish Hardeman	2	2	2	2	2	2	**1**	1	1	1	2	1	2	2	2	**2**	1	2	433
2	Jaxon Evans	**3**	3	4	**1**	1	1	2	Ret	2	**2**	1	2	**1**	1	1	1	2	1	414
3	Jake Klarich	8	5	7	3	3	3	3	2	3	3	3	3	Ret	3	3	3	Ret	DNS	311
4	Tim Miles	4	4	3	8	4	4	4	11	6	5	6	4	3	Ret	Ret	9	3	3	242
5	Sam Shahin	6	6	5	5	10	7	8	6	5	6	7	6	5	5	Ret	4	10	5	238
6	Anthony Gilbertson	9	7	8	9	6	6	9	Ret	7	9	10	5	13	6	4	5	4	4	194
7	Brian Finn	7	9	9	7	9	8	6	Ret	11	10	8	9	6	7	5	6	11	7	186
8	Jim Campbell				Ret	8	Ret	7	3	4	7	Ret	7	4	4	10				144
9	David Ryan	Ret	Ret	DNS	4	5	5	5	4	10	4	4	DNS							142
10	Ross McGregor	16	11	11	Ret	7	10	12	Ret	15	11	9	8	12	8	6	10	5	9	108
11	Ryan Simpson	1	1	1																93
12	Danny Stutterd^{†}	12	13	13	11	12	11	11	8	12				8	12	8				74
13	Michael Stillwell				12	13	9	10	5	8							7	6	8	68
14	Shane Barwood^{†}	15	16	16				15	9	13	12	11	11	11	11	11	12	9	10	54
15	John Goodacre	5	8	6																46
16	John Morriss				6	DNS	DNS				8	5	Ret	Ret	DNS	DNS				46
17	Tony Martin	14	15	15	13	15	14				13	12	10	9	13	9	13	8	Ret	45
18	Scott Taylor^{†}													10	9	7				32
19	Brendon Cook^{†}													7	10	Ret	11	7	Ret	28
20	Chris Stillwell							13	7	9										26
21	Phil Morriss	11	10	10																22
22	Richard Gartner^{†}				10	11	12													18
23	Michael Vati	10	12	12																16
24	Michael Tsigeridis^{†}	13	14	14				14	10	14							14	Ret		15
25	Sven Burchartz																8	Ret	6	12
26	Neville Steward^{†}				14	14	13				14	Ret	12							9

Colour	Result
Gold	Winner
Silver	Second place
Bronze	Third place
Green	Points classification
Blue	Non-points classification
Blue	Non-classified finish (NC)
Purple	Retired, not classified (Ret)
Red	Did not qualify (DNQ)
Red	Did not pre-qualify (DNPQ)
Black	Disqualified (DSQ)
White	Did not start (DNS)
White	Withdrew (WD)
White	Race cancelled (C)
Blank	Did not practice (DNP)
Blank	Did not arrive (DNA)
Blank	Excluded (EX)

Bold - Pole position
Italics - Fastest lap
† - B Class

== See also ==
- 2016 Porsche Carrera Cup Australia
