= 2016 Kerrick Sports Sedan Series =

Motor racing competition

The 2016 Kerrick Sports Sedan Series was an Australian motor racing competition sanctioned by the Confederation of Australian Motor Sport. There were three different classes, Class SS for Group 3D Sports Sedan, Class TA for Trans Am cars and Class M for cars produced by MARC Cars Australia.

The series was won by Tony Ricciardello.

== Teams and drivers ==
Team	Car	No.	Drivers
Ricciardello Racing	Alfa Romeo Alfetta GTV	1	Tony Ricciardello
Graeme Hume	Toyota MR2	3	Graeme Hume
Auto Union Deutsche	Audi A4	4	Jack Perkins
Domain Prestige Homes	Holden Calibra	9	Daniel Tamasi
Domain Prestige Homes	Nissan 300ZX	99	Steven Tamasi
Cowley Security Australia	Holden VE Commodore	11	Ian Cowley
Lennon Engineering International	Ford Mustang	12	Phil Crompton
Raptor Race Engineering	Mitsubishi Lancer Evo V	13	Matthew Reid
Tomkin Aust/Real Dairy Aust	Chevrolet Camaro	18	Steven Lacey
For Andrea	Holden LJ Torana	19	Damian Johnson
P&L Mechanical	Mazda RX-7	21	Graeme Gilliland
Couriers Please	Mitsubishi Lancer Evo VII	23	Daniel Smith
Weldcraft Motorsport	Chevrolet Corvette C5	25	Paul Boschert
Billy's Motorsport & Auto Service	Chevrolet Camaro	27	Birol Cetin
DS Industries	Honda Prelude	29	Brett Dickie
Bell Real Estate	Holden Monaro	32	Michael Robinson
Wall Racing	Chevrolet Corvette C5	38	David Wall
Stawell Cartage	Mazda RX-8	41	Bruce Henley
MR Automotive	Holden Monaro	44	Colin Smith
Marinelli's Mechanical	Holden VS Commodore	51	Bob McLoughlin
Rural & Civil Earthworks	Chevrolet Corvette C5	53	Stuart Inwood
MARC Cars Australia	Ford Focus	54	Tony Alford
MARC Cars Australia	Ford Focus	91	Ryan McLeod
MARC Cars Australia	Ford Focus	92	Michael Benton
MARC Cars Australia	Mazda 3	94	Peter McLeod
MARC Cars Australia	Ford Focus	95	Geoff Tauton
BJ Banks Electrical	Mazda RX-7	56	Bruce Banks
Rent Depot	Aston Martin DBR9	58	Kerry Baily
Andrew Brown Motorsport	Chevrolet Camaro	60	Andrew Brown
Fivestar Fencing & Gates	Chevrolet Corvette	66	Dean Camm
Aston Air Conditioning	Chevrolet Camaro	68	Shane Bradford; Chris Donnelly
Bob Jane T-Marts Southport	Holden VZ Commodore	71	Ashley Bright
Cleanup Skip Bins	BMW E36 M3	76	Brett Batterby
LRM Global	Subaru Impreza STI	86	Jonathon Lawson
Shepparton Toyota	Mini Cooper S	87	Daniel Zandt
Dream Motorsport	Saab 9-3 Aero	93	Ricky Capo
MRT Automotive	Honda Prelude	96	Vin McNair

== Race calendar ==
The series was contested over five rounds, each consisting of three races.

Round	Circuit	City / state	Date	Round winner
1	(Victoria (state)) Sandown Raceway	Melbourne, Victoria	1–3 April	(Australia) Jack Perkins
2	(Victoria (state)) Winton Raceway	Winton, Victoria	10–12 June	(Australia) Tony Ricciardello
3	Queensland Raceway	Ipswich, Queensland	29–31 July	(Australia) Tony Ricciardello
4	(Victoria (state)) Phillip Island Grand Prix Circuit	Phillip Island, Victoria	9–11 September	(Australia) Jack Perkins
5	(New South Wales) Sydney Motorsport Park	Sydney, New South Wales	11–13 November	(Australia) Jack Perkins

== Series standings ==
Pos.	Driver	SAN (Victoria (state))			WIN (Victoria (state))			QLD (Queensland)			PHI (Victoria (state))			SMP (New South Wales)			Pts.
1	Tony Ricciardello	2	2	3	2	1	1	2	2	1	2	2	2	2	2	2	640
2	Jack Perkins	1	1	1	1	Ret	Ret	1	1	DNS	1	1	1	1	1	1	465
3	Steven Tamasi	5	6	6				4	4	2	DNS	3	4	4	5	4	406
4	Michael Robinson	6	5	Ret	7	5	2	7	7	8	7	Ret	Ret	Ret	6	6	381
5	Colin Smith	Ret	9	10	Ret	9	7	Ret	Ret	5	5	6	6	3	8	7	373
6	Daniel Tamasi	4	4	4				6	6	3	3	4	3	Ret			330
7	Stuart Inwood	8	13	8	6	4	6	Ret	Ret	6				Ret			209
8	Shane Bradford	Ret	DNS	DNS				5	5	4	6	DNS	DNS				135
9	David Wall	3	3	2													121
10	Brett Dickie				4	8	5										99
11	Birol Cetin													Ret	3	3	91
12	Bruce Banks	Ret	7	5	8	DNS	DNS										87
13	Chris Donnelly				Ret	6	4										85
14	Steve Lacey													Ret	4	5	80
15	Ian Cowley				5	11	8										76
16	Bob McLoughlin							9	9	9	DNS	Ret	DNS				75
17	Ricky Capo				3	2	DNS										68
18	Brett Batterby							11	11	10							64
19	Dean Camm	7	Ret	7										Ret			54
20	Jonathan Lawson				13	13	9										50
21	Paul Boschert													5	7	Ret	49
22	Bruce Henley				10	10	Ret										33
23	Phil Crompton				Ret	7	Ret	Ret	Ret	DNS							30
24	Daniel Zandt				11	12	Ret										25
25	Vin McNair				12	14	DNS										17
26	Damian Johnson				9	DNS	Ret										14
27	Ashley Bright							10	10	DNS							14
28	Graeme Hume				Ret	15	DNS										6
29	Graeme Gilliland																0
30	Andrew Brown	Ret	DNS	DNS													0
31	Matthew Reid													Ret			0
32	Daniel Smith													Ret	Ret		0
