= 2016 Australian Superkart Championship =

The 2016 Australian Superkart season is a national level Superkart in Australia. There are three classes, 250cc International, 250cc National and 150cc National.

== Teams and drivers ==
| Team | Class | Chassis | No | Driver | Round |
|---|---|---|---|---|---|
| Coach Design | 250 Int | Anderson Maverick | 1 | Russell Jamieson | 1–2 |
| MJR Bricklaying / Wizzer | 250 Int | Anderson Maverick | 6 | Martin Latta | 1 |
| ART Motorsport / Ciscos Tuning | 250 Int | ART-PVP | 8 | Anton Stevens | 1–2 |
| Wizzer Enginest/BRC Engines/Dunlop | 250 Int | Anderson Maverick | 10 | Gary Pegoraro | 1–2 |
| PSR Rockpress Racing | 125 Int | Avoig Elise PSR | 12 | Phillip Silcock | 1–2 |
| Top Torque Performance | 250 Int | Anderson | 14 | Matt Bass | 2 |
| Avvero Solutions | 250 Int | PVP | 17 | Alan Rose | 1 |
| Redback Race Paint (ACT) | 125 Nat | Avoig Elise Mk3 | 20 | Paul Campbell | 1–2 |
| Master Painting & Decorating | 250 Nat | Anderson Maverick | 21 | Shayne McLaren | 2 |
| Slipstream Sign | 250 Nat | Anderson Maverick | 22 | Jordan Ford | 1–2 |
| C-Systems Dyno | 125 Int | Anderson Maverick | 23 | Timothy Philp | 1 |
| C-Systems Dyno | 125 Int | Avoid Elise | 23 | Timothy Philp | 2 |
| Bakker Superkarts | 125 Int | Bakker X4 | 26 | Brad Stebbing | 1–2 |
| Your Amigo | 250 Int | Anderson Maverick | 29 | Ilya Harpas | 1–2 |
| THP Motorsport | 250 Int | Anderson Maverick | 30 | Jason Smith | 2 |
| KJB Accountants & Business Advisor | 250 Int | Anderson Maverick | 33 | Kristian Stebbing | 1–2 |
| KJB Accountants & Business Advisor | 125 Int | Stockman MR2 | 48 | Geoff Lawrence | 1–2 |
| Stockman Superkarts | 125 Nat | Stockman MR2 | 34 | Jeff Reed | 1 |
| Stockman Superkarts | 250 Int | Stockman MR2 | 43 | Warren McIlveen | 1 |
| Scoresby Paving | 250 Nat | Anderson Maverick | 38 | Raff Pironti | 2 |
| Colourite Painting | 125 Int | Avoig Elise Mk4 | 46 | Mark Robin | 1–2 |
| Giova Racing / FCS Racing | 250 Nat | Avoig Elise | 62 | John Pellicano | 2 |
| Giova Racing / FCS Racing | 125 Int | Anderson Maverick | 80 | Adam Stewart | 1 |
| Giova Racing / FCS Racing | 125 Int | Anderson Mirage | 80 | Adam Stewart | 2 |
| Sydney Asphalt Repairs | 250 Nat | Anderson Maverick | 63 | John Dunn | 1–2 |
| Shiftmn | 250 Int | Stockman MR2 | 68 | Michael Nicholas | 1–2 |
| M Sinani | 125 Int | Stockman MR2 | 69 | Mehmet Sinani | 1 |
| Avoig Superkarts / Rat Pack Racing | 250 Nat | Avoig KTM 250 | 74 | Aaron Cogger | 1 |
| Avoig Superkarts / Rat Pack Racing | 250 Nat | Avoig Cogger | 74 | Aaron Cogger | 2 |
| L&J Designs | 125 Nat | Avoig Elise Mk 30 | 76 | Lee Vella | 1–2 |
| Designs & Cramaro Tarps | 250 Nat | Stockman MR2 | 88 | Ian Fahey | 1 |
| Zahl 1 Kartsing / CBC BRGS; WFR | 250 Nat | Anderson Maverick | 89 | Timothy Weier | 1–2 |
| Transport & Logistic | 250 Int | Ninor | 94 | Grant Heard | 2 |

== Race calendar ==
The championship is being contested over three rounds with three heats and a final at each round.

| Round | Circuit | City / state | Date | 250 International Winning driver | 250 National Winning driver | 150 International Winning driver |
|---|---|---|---|---|---|---|
| 1 | (New South Wales) Sydney Motorsport Park | Sydney, New South Wales | 27–29 May | Russell Jamieson | Timothy Weier | Lee Vella |
| 2 | (Victoria (state)) Phillip Island Grand Prix Circuit | Phillip Island, Victoria | 9–11 September | Ilya Harpas | Jordan Ford | Brad Stebbing |
| 2 | (New South Wales) Sydney Motorsport Park | Sydney, New South Wales | 11–13 November | | | |

== Championship Standings ==
| Pos. | Driver | SMP (New South Wales) | | | | PHI (Victoria (state)) | | | | SMP (New South Wales) | Pts. |
250 INTERNATIONAL
| 1 | Russell Jamieson | 4 | 1 | 1 | 2 | 1 | 1 | 1 | 2 | | 157 |
| 2 | Ilya Harpas | 1 | 2 | Ret | 1 | 2 | 2 | 2 | 1 | | 138 |
| 3 | Anton Stevens | 2 | 4 | Ret | 4 | 6 | 6 | 5 | 3 | | 101 |
| 4 | Gary Pegoraro | 5 | 3 | Ret | Ret | 3 | 3 | 3 | 4 | | 89 |
| 5 | Michael Nicholas | 15 | 13 | 11 | 13 | 10 | 11 | 10 | Ret | | 75 |
| 6 | Kristian Stebbing | 6 | 5 | Ret | DNS | 5 | 5 | 6 | 5 | | 69 |
| 7 | Martin Latta | 8 | 7 | 2 | 5 | | | | | | 54 |
| 8 | Matt Bass | | | | | 4 | 4 | 4 | 6 | | 54 |
| 9 | Alan Rose | DNS | DNS | 8 | 12 | | | | | | 31 |
| 10 | Jason Smith | | | | | 8 | 8 | Ret | Ret | | 23 |
| 11 | Warren McIlveen | 3 | Ret | Ret | DNS | DNS | DNS | DNS | DNS | | 15 |
| 12 | Grant Heard | | | | | Ret | Ret | DNS | DNS | | 15 |
250 NATIONAL
| 1 | Jordan Ford | 7 | DNS | 3 | 3 | 7 | 7 | 7 | 7 | | 150 |
| 2 | Aaron Cogger | 10 | 10 | 7 | 9 | 9 | 10 | 8 | 9 | | 136 |
| 3 | Timothy Weier | 9 | 6 | 4 | 6 | Ret | 9 | 11 | 10 | | 119 |
| 4 | John Dunn | 17 | 14 | 12 | 14 | Ret | 18 | 16 | Ret | | 80 |
| 5 | John Pellicano | | | | | 11 | 17 | 9 | 8 | | 65 |
| 6 | Raff Pironti | | | | | Ret | 19 | 15 | 14 | | 32 |
| 7 | Shayne McLaren | | | | | 12 | Ret | DNS | Ret | | 18 |
| 8 | Ian Fahey | 18 | Ret | DNS | Ret | | | | | | 11 |
125 INTERNATIONAL
| 1 | Lee Vella | Ret | 8 | 5 | 7 | 13 | 12 | Ret | 13 | | 125 |
| 2 | Adam Stewart | 13 | 11 | 10 | 10 | 15 | 14 | 14 | 12 | | 130 |
| 3 | Mark Robin | DSQ | 12 | 6 | 8 | Ret | Ret | Ret | 16 | | 63 |
| 4 | Phil Silcock | 16 | 15 | 13 | 16 | 18 | 21 | 17 | 15 | | 98 |
| 5 | Brad Stebbing | 14 | Ret | 9 | 17 | 16 | 16 | Ret | 11 | | 91 |
| 6 | Paul Campbell | 11 | 9 | Ret | Ret | 14 | 20 | 13 | Ret | | 86 |
| 7 | Mehmet Sinani | Ret | DNS | DNS | 11 | | | | | | 18 |
| 8 | Jeff Reed | 12 | Ret | DNS | DNS | DNS | DNS | DNS | DNS | | 17 |
| 9 | Geoff Lawrence | Ret | DNS | Ret | 15 | 17 | 15 | Ret | Ret | | 45 |
| 10 | Tim Philp | DSQ | DSQ | DSQ | DSQ | DNS | 13 | 12 | Ret | | 37 |
| 11 | Tony Lappas | | | | | DNS | DNS | DNS | DNS | | 0 |
