= Jack Perkins (racing driver) =

Australian amateur racing driver (born 1986)

- Perkins at Mike Pero Pukekohe 500 2013
- Nationality: (Australia) Australian
- Born: 22 August 1986 (age 40) Melbourne, Victoria, Australia
- Relatives: Eddie Perkins (grandfather); George Reynolds (grand-uncle); Larry Perkins (father)
- Categorisation: FIA Gold

Supercars Championship career
- Current team: Triple Eight Race Engineering (Endurance race co-driver)
- Championships: 0
- Races: 157
- Wins: 1
- Podiums: 3
- Pole positions: 0
- 2024 position: 47th (186 points)

NASCAR O'Reilly Auto Parts Series career
- 2 races run over 1 year
- 2025 position: 64th
- Best finish: 64th (2025)
- First race: 2025 The Loop 110 (Chicago)
- Last race: 2025 Pacific Office Automation 147 (Portland)
Wins	Top tens	Poles
0	0	0
- Statistics up to date as of 1 November 2025.

Jack Perkins (born 22 August 1986) is an Australian motor racing driver who competes in the Pirtek Enduro Cup. He currently co-drives with Jackson Walls in the No. 11 Ford Mustang for Triple Eight Race Engineering. He is the son of retired Australian race driver and former team owner Larry Perkins, in whose team Perkins Engineering, he drove between 2006 and 2008. Initially competing as an endurance race only driver in 2006, in 2007 Perkins graduated to the full-time drive in the No. 11 Perkins Engineering car, the number made famous in Australian racing by his father.

== Career ==
=== Perkins Engineering ===
The Perkins Engineering team run by his father Larry, ran a two-car Fujitsu Development Series racing program in 2006, leading to Perkins getting the drive in the second No. 78 car, with Shane Price getting the lead drive in No. 77. The cars were largely unsponsored, though had a clear association with the main series Jack Daniel's-sponsored Perkins Engineering cars. Perkins and Price were also immediately earmarked to drive the No. 11 Perkins Engineering car in the 2006 endurance races.

Price was generally faster than Perkins during the Fujitsu series, but Perkins managed to finish third in the championship standings, just behind Price, who was narrowly defeated by Adam Macrow for the title.

In the Sandown 500, Perkins – together with Price – brought the No. 11 Jack Daniel's Commodore home in 24th position, after Perkins qualified the car in 20th position.

Come the SuperCheap Auto Bathurst 1000, Price took over the qualifying duties, and placed the car in 27th position for the race. Perkins started the race, which ended at the end of the first lap, when race favourite Mark Skaife suffered a slipping clutch off the start line, which caused his No. 2 Holden Racing Team Commodore to fall to the tail of the field. Perkins, arriving blind over the hump in Mountain Straight ploughed into the back of Skaife's ailing car, putting it out on the spot. Perkins limped around to the pits missing a front left wheel, and with an hydraulic brake line on fire. It did not continue in the race.

After the late and sudden departure of both Steven Richards and Paul Dumbrell from the team at the end of 2006, Perkins and Price were elevated to the full-time championship drives for Perkins Engineering in 2007. While it was not ideal for the inexperienced Perkins and Price to suddenly find themselves racing in the main series, while developing new cars, the timing of Richards and Dumbrell's departure left the team without an opportunity to sign an experienced "name" driver, all of whom had committed contracts for 2007.

Perkins had a mixed season in 2007, with some outstanding results such as qualifying in the top ten at Winton Raceway, coupled with many disappointing race exits whilst running in strong positions. Although he was generally keeping pace with the more highly rated Shane Price, Jack's performances behind the wheel were suffering towards the end of long stints behind the wheel. It was later found that Perkins was suffering from Type One Diabetes, as described further down in this article.

Perkins returned to the team in 2008 for the endurance races, partnered with Nathan Pretty – finishing eighth at Phillip Island, and eighth at Bathurst – and eventually to the full-time drive from the Indy Grand Prix round of the season onwards, after the slide of form and eventual dumping of Shane Price from the team. Price, who had already been dropped to the position of number two driver, following the arrival of Todd Kelly at the beginning of 2008, was left without a drive. Perkins had already returned to competition in the 2008 Fujitsu Development Series, running a Mack-sponsored Commodore for Independent Race Cars Australia.

=== Independent Race Cars Australia ===
After bringing his medical condition under control, Perkins competed in the Fujitsu V8 Development Series in a Perkins Engineering built car, but run by Independent Race Cars Australia in 2008, with a view to a return to a full-time drive in the main championship series in 2009.

Although starting the series strongly in Adelaide, a mid-season slump saw his title chances slide. Seeking an improvement for the end of the season, the car was brought back into the Perkins Engineering workshops from the Bathurst round onwards. With better knowledge of the car, the engineers were able to help Perkins to some better results, culminating in a race and round win at the final round at Oran Park. The result was a fifth placing in the championship.

=== Kelly Racing ===
Perkins returned to the main V8 Supercar championship in 2009 behind the wheel of the No. 11 Kelly Racing Commodore carrying sponsorship from Dodo Internet. The deal was part of a merger and eventual takeover of Perkins Engineering by the new Kelly Racing. Jack's No. 11 car for 2009 was the car previously run by Todd Kelly at Perkins Engineering in 2008, chassis number PE047.

The 2009 season was disappointing for Perkins. The new Kelly Racing team was the only four-car team in the series and results were thin. By season's end, team leaders Rick and Todd Kelly were beginning to gain results but results for Perkins and the team's fourth car did not come and Perkins was not retained into 2010.

=== Paul Morris Motorsport ===
Perkins was without a drive for the 2010 season leaving him to pursue a role with Paul Morris Motorsport as a signwriter. This eventually led to a part-time return to the second-tier Fujitsu V8 Supercar Series in a spare PMM Commodore chassis with limited support from the main team. Perkins's performances in the second tier series where strong enough to earn him a call-up to James Rosenberg Racing for the 2010 Philip Island 500 and Bathurst 1000, pairing with Tim Slade.

Perkins' continued strong 2010 form led to Paul Morris Motorsports team owner, Paul Morris, deciding to personally step down from his own driving duties at the Gold Coast round of the championship where he was scheduled to drive with Russell Ingall to allow Perkins to take over the drive. This stirred the sports traditionalists as it re-ignited the famous "Perkins – Ingall" partnership which Jack's father Larry shared with Russell Ingall, which led to two Bathurst 1000 crowns. The two drivers worked well together and performed strongly at the event which led to Paul Morris deciding to sign Perkins to compete in the 2011 Philip Island 500 and Bathurst 1000, again pairing with Russell Ingall.

=== James Rosenberg Racing ===
Perkins' strong performances in the Fujitsu series in 2010 led to a drive with James Rosenberg Racing for the 2010 endurance races. Perkins and Tim Slade finished the Phillip Island 500 in a strong fifth position equalling the team's best sprint race performance from earlier in the season.

=== Sonic Motor Racing ===
Perkins signed a deal with Sonic Motor Racing to compete in the 2011 Fujitsu V8 Supercar Series with support from Bob Jane T-Marts, Supercheap Auto, Acu-check and Castrol, using a BF Falcon built by Triple Eight Race Engineering.

=== Garry Rogers Motorsport ===
Perkins signed with Garry Rogers Motorsport, to partner Alexandre Premat for the 2012 V8 Supercar endurance events at the Dick Smith Sandown 500 and Supercheap Auto Bathurst 1000.

Perkins returned to GRM for the 2013 V8 Supercars Pirtek Endurance Cup alongside full-time rookie, Scott McLaughlin. The duo matched Perkins previous best result with an eighth at Bathurst. The No. 33 Commodore was looking strong in the Pirtek Endurance Cup until an electrical issue dogged there challenge at the Armor All Gold Coast 600.

=== Eggleston Motorsport ===
Following the opening round of the 2013 Dunlop V8 Supercar Series at the Clipsal 500, it was announced that Perkins would drive an Eggleston Motorsport Commodore at the second round at Barbagallo Raceway. Perkins finished the championship fourth in the driver's standings even though he missed the opening round in Adelaide.

=== Charlie Schwerkolt Racing ===
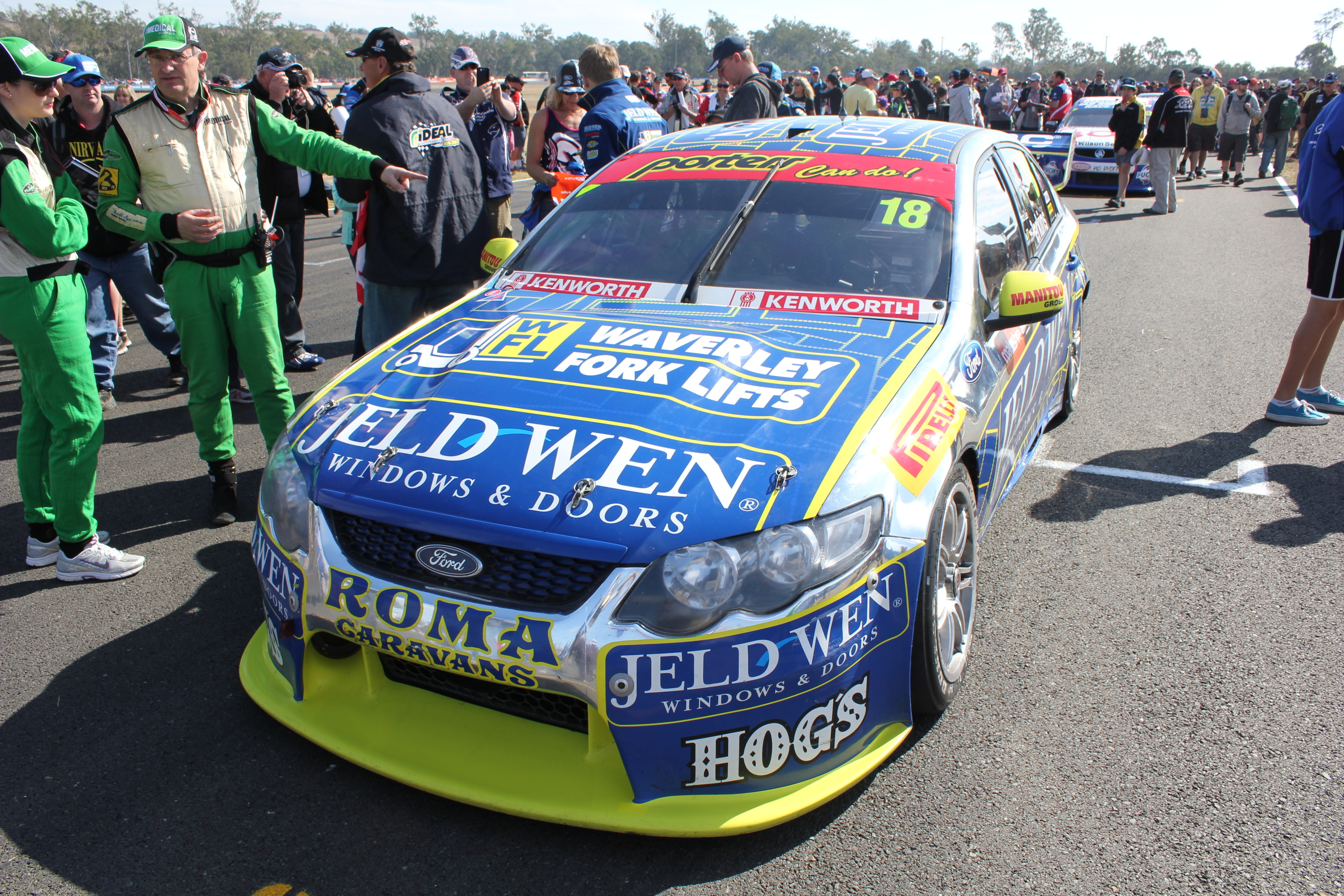
The Ford FG Falcon of Perkins at the 2014 Coates Hire Ipswich 400

On 19 December 2013, it was announced that Perkins would pilot the No. 18 Jeld Wen Ford FG Falcon for the 2014 International V8 Supercars Championship Series. The 2014 Clipsal 500 marked his return to full-time driving since 2009. He was dropped at the end of the season in favour of Lee Holdsworth. Bathurst was the main highlight of the year, with Perkins qualifying in the top-ten and making the shootout. A mistake made on the final corner took him to grid position 9, although he was on track to be around position 6. In the late stages of the race, the car was running in the top-five, with a chance for a podium result. However, due to a mistake in pit lane whilst re-entering traffic, they were given a penalty. They later finished twelfth.

=== Holden Racing Team/Walkinshaw Racing/Walkinshaw Andretti United ===
Perkins stepped back from full-time driving in Supercars' top category in 2015 to sign with the Holden Racing Team as a co-driver for the Pirtek Enduro Cup. Winning the Gold Coast 600 with James Courtney in 2015. The pair continued for five years, another podium finish at the Gold Coast in 2018 and in 2019, Perkins collected his first Bathurst podium, finishing in third place in the No. 22 Holden ZB Commodore for Walkinshaw Andretti United.

=== NASCAR ===
On May 22, 2025, it was announced that Perkins would make his NASCAR debut, driving in the Xfinity Series for Joe Gibbs Racing at Portland International Raceway. It was announced on June 26 that Perkins would make his NASCAR debut earlier driving for JGR at the Chicago street course race.

== Type 1 diabetes ==
Shortly before the penultimate round of the 2007 V8 Supercars Championship Series, Perkins was diagnosed with type one diabetes, which forced him to step down from the full-time drive of the No. 11 Perkins Engineering Commodore. His place was taken by Marcus Marshall for the final two rounds, as Marshall had had a stint with the team in the 2007 endurance races and was familiar with the team and cars.

Perkins gained control over his condition in 2008 and after passing tests for his fitness to regain his racing licence from the governing body of motorsports in Australia, CAMS, he returned to the track in the V8 Supercar Development Series.

Perkins has become a spokesperson for Diabetes Australia, and has held several events to raise money for DA, and the Juvenile Diabetes Research Foundation. He maintains personal sponsorship from Accu-Chek, manufacturers of blood sugar test equipment.

== Media ==
Perkins has spent time as a television commentator, often being an analyst for categories such as the Dunlop V8 Supercar Series, Australian GT Championship, as well as speedway's World Series Sprintcars.

== Motorsports career results ==
Season	Series	Position	Car	Team
2005	Australian Formula Ford Championship	20th	Van Diemen RF92 Ford	Perkins Engineering
2005	Victorian Formula Ford Championship	9th	Van Diemen RF92 Ford	Perkins Engineering
2006	Fujitsu V8 Supercar Series	**3rd**	Holden VZ Commodore	Perkins Engineering
2006	V8 Supercar Championship Series	57th	Holden VZ Commodore	Jack Daniel's Racing; Paul Morris Motorsport
2007	V8 Supercar Championship Series	48th	Holden VZ Commodore; Holden VE Commodore	Jack Daniel's Racing
2008	Fujitsu V8 Supercar Series	5th	Holden VZ Commodore	Independent Race Cars Australia
2008	V8 Supercar Championship Series	29th	Holden VE Commodore	Jack Daniel's Racing
2009	V8 Supercar Championship Series	26th	Holden VE Commodore	Kelly Racing
2010	Aussie Racing Cars	10th	Aurion-Yamaha	
2010	Fujitsu V8 Supercar Series	13th	Holden VE Commodore	James Rosenberg Racing; Paul Morris Motorsport
2010	V8 Supercar Championship Series	37th	Ford FG Falcon; Holden VE Commodore	James Rosenberg Racing; Paul Morris Motorsport
2011	International V8 Supercars Championship	42nd	Holden VE Commodore	Paul Morris Motorsport
2011	Fujitsu V8 Supercar Series	**2nd**	Ford BF Falcon	Sonic Motor Racing Services
2012	V8SuperTourer Championship	10th	Holden VE Commodore	M3 Racing
2012	International V8 Supercars Championship	45th	Holden VE Commodore	Garry Rogers Motorsport
2013	International V8 Supercars Championship	39th	Holden VF Commodore	Garry Rogers Motorsport
2013	V8 Supercar Endurance Cup	10th	Holden VF Commodore	Garry Rogers Motorsport
2013	Australian GT Trophy	**2nd**	Ginetta G50 GT4	Williams Race Services
2013	V8SuperTourers Championship	14th	Holden VE Commodore	M3 Racing
2013	Dunlop V8 Supercar Series	4th	Holden VE Commodore	Eggleston Motorsport
2014	International V8 Supercars Championship	23rd	Ford FG Falcon	Charlie Schwerkolt Racing
2015	International V8 Supercars Championship	26th	Holden VF Commodore	Holden Racing Team; Lucas Dumbrell Motorsport
2015	Kumho Tyres Australian V8 Touring Car Series	13th	Holden VZ Commodore	Eggleston Motorsport
2015	Kerrick Sports Sedan Series	4th	Audi A4	Auto Union Deutsche
2016	Kerrick Sports Sedan Series	**2nd**	Audi A4	Auto Union Deutsche
2016	International V8 Supercars Championship	41st	Holden VF Commodore	Holden Racing Team
2017	Dunlop Super2 Series	14th	Holden VF Commodore	Dragon Motor Racing; Image Racing
2017	Virgin Australia Supercars Championship	35th	Holden VF Commodore	Walkinshaw Racing; Lucas Dumbrell Motorsport
2017	National Sports Sedan Series	4th	Audi A4	Auto Union Deutsche
2018	Virgin Australia Supercars Championship	46th	Holden ZB Commodore	Walkinshaw Andretti United
2019	Dunlop Super2 Series	14th	Holden VF Commodore	Eggleston Motorsport
2019	Virgin Australia Supercars Championship	31st	Holden ZB Commodore	Walkinshaw Andretti United
2020	Super2 Series	12th	Holden VF Commodore	Eggleston Motorsport
2020	Virgin Australia Supercars Championship	NC	Holden ZB Commodore	Brad Jones Racing
2021	Super2 Series	18th	Holden VF Commodore	Eggleston Motorsport
2021	Supercars Championship	44th	Holden ZB Commodore	Erebus Motorsport
2022	Super2 Series	19th	Holden VF Commodore	Eggleston Motorsport
2022	Supercars Championship	40th	Holden ZB Commodore	Erebus Motorsport
2023	Super2 Series	20th	Holden ZB Commodore	Eggleston Motorsport
2023	Repco Supercars Championship	29th	Chevrolet Camaro ZL1	Eggleston Motorsport
2024	Super2 Series	16th	Ford Mustang GT	Blanchard Racing Team
2024	Repco Supercars Championship	47th	Ford Mustang S650	Blanchard Racing Team
2025	Repco Supercars Championship	51st	Ford Mustang S650	Blanchard Racing Team

=== Super3 Series results ===
(key) (Races in bold indicate pole position) (Races in italics indicate fastest lap)

Super3 Series results
Year	Team	No.	Car	1	2	3	4	5	6	7	8	9	10	11	12	13	14	15	Position	Points
2015	Eggleston Motorsport	54	Holden VZ Commodore	**SAN**; **R1**; 1	**SAN**; **R2**; 1	**SAN**; **R3**; 1	WIN; R4	WIN; R5	WIN; R6	QLD; R7	QLD; R8	QLD; R9	PHI; R10	PHI; R11	PHI; R12	SMP; R13	SMP; R14	SMP; R15	13th	143

=== Super2 Series results ===
(key) (Races in bold indicate pole position) (Races in italics indicate fastest lap)

Super2 Series results
Year	Team	No.	Car	1	2	3	4	5	6	7	8	9	10	11	12	13	14	15	16	17	18	19	20	21	Position	Points
2006	Perkins Engineering	78	Holden VZ Commodore	ADE; R1; 27	ADE; R2; 10	ADE; R3; 4	WAK; R4; 4	WAK; R5; 22	WAK; R6; 8	QLD; R7; 6	QLD; R8; 8	QLD; R9; 5	ORA; R10; 6	ORA; R11; 17	ORA; R12; 4	MAL; R13; 3	MAL; R14; 9	MAL; R15; Ret	BAT; R16; 10	BAT; R17; 3	PHI; R18; 6	PHI; R19; 9			**3rd**	**1597**
2008	Independent Race Cars Australia	500	Holden VZ Commodore	ADE; R1; 2	ADE; R2; 2	WAK; R3; 4	WAK; R4; 14	WAK; R5; 5	SAN; R6; 26	SAN; R7; Ret	SAN; R8; 11	QLD; R9; 6	QLD; R10; Ret	QLD; R11; Ret	WIN; R12; 3	WIN; R13; 2	WIN; R14; 2	BAT; R15; 3	BAT; R16; 6	ORA; R17; 2	ORA; R18; 1				5th	1399
2010	Paul Morris Motorsport	78	Holden VE Commodore	ADE; R1	ADE; R2	QLD; R3; 4	QLD; R4; 3	QLD; R5; 1																	13th	661
2010	Paul Morris Motorsport	67	Holden VE Commodore						WIN; R6; 15	WIN; R7; 8	WIN; R8; 5	TOW; R9	TOW; R10	TOW; R11	BAT; R12	BAT; R13	SAN; R14; 2	SAN; R15; 4	SAN; R16; 10	HOM; R17	HOM; R18				13th	661
2011	Sonic Motor Racing Services	999	Ford BF Falcon	ADE; R1; 3	ADE; R2; 21	BAR; R3; 2	BAR; R4; 4	TOW; R5; 6	TOW; R6; 2	TOW; R7; 2	QLD; R8; 10	QLD; R9; 7	QLD; R10; 7	BAT; R11; 3	BAT; R12; 3	SAN; R13; 1	**SAN**; **R14**; **11**	SAN; R15; 3	HOM; R16; 5	HOM; R17; 1					**2nd**	**1601**
2013	Eggleston Motorsport	54	Holden VE Commodore	ADE; R1	ADE; R2	BAR; R3; 9	BAR; R4; 1	BAR; R5; 7	TOW; R6; 18	TOW; R7; 10	TOW; R8; 7	QLD; R9; 2	QLD; R10; 7	QLD; R11; 1	**WIN**; **R12**; **2**	WIN; R13; 8	WIN; R14; 1	BAT; R15; 3	BAT; R16; 3	HOM; R17; 3	HOM; R18; 3				4th	1404
2017	Dragon Motor Racing Image Racing	4	Holden VF Commodore	ADE; R1; 9	ADE; R2; 8	ADE; R3; 17	SYM; R4; 7	SYM; R5; 6	SYM; R6; 5	SYM; R7; 4	PHI; R8; Ret	PHI; R9; 17	PHI; R10; Ret	PHI; R11; 13	TOW; R12; 8	TOW; R13; 5	SYD; R14; DNS	SYD; R15; DNS	SYD; R16; DNS	SYD; R17; DNS	SAN; R18; Ret	SAN; R19; 5	NEW; R20; Ret	NEW; R21; 18	14th	789
2019	Eggleston Motorsport	54	Holden VF Commodore	ADE; R1	ADE; R2	ADE; R3	BAR; R4	BAR; R5	TOW; R6; 10	TOW; R7; 8	QLD; R8; 5	QLD; R9; 15	BAT; R10; WD	SAN; R11; 5	SAN; R12; 2	NEW; R13; 15	NEW; R14; 5								14th	759
2020	Eggleston Motorsport	54	Holden VF Commodore	ADE; R1; 6	ADE; R2; Ret	ADE; R3; Ret	SYD; R4; 7	SYD; R5; 6	BAT; R6	BAT; R7															12th	236
2021	Eggleston Motorsport	88	Holden VF Commodore	BAT; R1	BAT; R2	TOW1; R3	TOW1; R4	TOW2; R5; 11	TOW2; R6; 5	SMP; R7	SMP; R8	BAT; R9	BAT; R10												18th	183
2022	Eggleston Motorsport	50	Holden VF Commodore	SMP; R1	SMP; R2	BAR; R3	BAR; R4	TOW; R5	TOW; R6	SAN; R7; 11	SAN; R8; 2	BAT; R9	BAT; R10	ADE; R11	ADE; R12										19th	210
2023	Erebus Motorsport	70	Holden ZB Commodore	NEW; R1; 2	NEW; R2; Ret	BAR; R3; 15	BAR; R4; 11	TOW; R5; DNS	TOW; R6; DNS	SAN; R7; 10	SAN; R8; 8	BAT; R9; Ret	BAT; R10; DNS	ADE; R11	ADE; R12										20th	438
2024	Blanchard Racing Team	79	Ford Mustang S550	BAT1; R1	BAT1; R2	WAN; R3	WAN; R4	**TOW**; **R5**; **1**	TOW; R6; 3	SAN; R7; 1	SAN; R8; 6	BAT; R9	BAT; R10	ADE; R11	ADE; R12										16th	531

=== Supercars Championship results ===
Supercars results
Year	Team	No.	Car	1	2	3	4	5	6	7	8	9	10	11	12	13	14	15	16	17	18	19	20	21	22	23	24	25	26	27	28	29	30	31	32	33	34	35	36	37	38	39	Position	Points
2006	Perkins Engineering	11	Holden VZ Commodore	ADE; R1	ADE; R2	PUK; R3	PUK; R4	PUK; R5	BAR; R6	BAR; R7	BAR; R8	WIN; R9	WIN; R10	WIN; R11	HDV; R12	HDV; R13	HDV; R14	QLD; R15	QLD; R16	QLD; R17	ORA; R18	ORA; R19	ORA; R20	SAN; R21; 16	BAT; R22; Ret	SUR; R23	SUR; R24	SUR; R25	SYM; R26	SYM; R27	SYM; R28												57th	130
2006	Paul Morris Motorsport	39	Holden VZ Commodore																													BHR; R29; 21	BHR; R30; Ret	BHR; R31; DNS	PHI; R32	PHI; R33	PHI; R34						57th	130
2007	Perkins Engineering	11	Holden VZ Commodore	ADE; R1; 19	ADE; R2; Ret	BAR; R3; 21	BAR; R4; 26	BAR; R5; 25	PUK; R6; DNS	PUK; R7; DNS	PUK; R8; DNS																																51st	6
2007	Perkins Engineering	11	Holden VE Commodore									WIN; R9; 22	WIN; R10; 18	WIN; R11; Ret	EAS; R12; 20	EAS; R13; 20	EAS; R14; 25	HID; R15; 21	HID; R16; 24	HID; R17; 21	QLD; R18; Ret	QLD; R19; 19	QLD; R20; 11	ORA; R21; 21	ORA; R22; 26	ORA; R23; 18	SAN; R24; Ret	BAT; R25; Ret	SUR; R26; 16	SUR; R27; 19	SUR; R28; Ret	BAH; R29; 17	BAH; R30; 17	BAH; R31; Ret	SYM; R32	SYM; R33	SYM; R34	PHI; R35	PHI; R36	PHI; R37			51st	6
2008	Perkins Engineering	11	Holden VE Commodore	ADE; R1	ADE; R2	EAS; R3	EAS; R4	EAS; R5	HAM; R6	HAM; R7	HAM; R8	BAR; R9	BAR; R10	BAR; R11	SAN; R12	SAN; R13	SAN; R14	HID; R15	HID; R16	HID; R17	QLD; R18	QLD; R19	QLD; R20	WIN; R21	WIN; R22	WIN; R23	PHI; R24; 8	BAT; R25; 8	SUR; R26; 18	SUR; R27; 15	SUR; R28; 23	BAH; R29; 19	BAH; R30; 15	BAH; R31; Ret	SYM; R32; Ret	SYM; R33; 22	SYM; R34; 25	ORA; R35; 17	ORA; R36; Ret	ORA; R37; 20			29th	620
2009	Kelly Racing	11	Holden VE Commodore	ADE; R1; Ret	ADE; R2; Ret	HAM; R3; 19	HAM; R4; 17	WIN; R5; 19	WIN; R6; 19	SYM; R7; 21	SYM; R8; 21	HID; R9; Ret	HID; R10; 24	TOW; R11; 18	TOW; R12; 22	SAN; R13; 13	SAN; R14; Ret	QLD; R15; 23	QLD; R16; 26	PHI; Q 12	PHI; R17; 14	BAT; R18; 14	SUR; R19; 14	SUR; R20; 15	SUR; R21; Ret	SUR; R22; 18	PHI; R23; 25	PHI; R24; 23	BAR; R25; 26	BAR; R26; 24	SYD; R27; Ret	SYD; R28; Ret											26th	993
2010	James Rosenberg Racing	47	Ford FG Falcon	YMC; R1	YMC; R2	BHR; R3	BHR; R4	ADE; R5	ADE; R6	HAM; R7	HAM; R8	QLD; R9	QLD; R10	WIN; R11	WIN; R12	HDV; R13	HDV; R14	TOW; R15	TOW; R16	PHI; R17; 5	BAT; R18; 18																						37th	452
2010	Paul Morris Motorsport	39	Holden VE Commodore																			SUR; R19; 12	SUR; R20; 8	SYM; R21	SYM; R22	SAN; R23	SAN; R24	SYD; R25	SYD; R26														37th	452
2011	Paul Morris Motorsport	39	Holden VE Commodore	YMC; R1	YMC; R2	ADE; R3	ADE; R4	HAM; R5	HAM; R6	BAR; R7	BAR; R8	BAR; R9	WIN; R10	WIN; R11	HID; R12	HID; R13	TOW; R14	TOW; R15	QLD; R16	QLD; R17	QLD; R18	PHI; R19; 20	BAT; R20; 8	SUR; R21	SUR; R22	SYM; R23	SYM; R24	SAN; R25	SAN; R26	SYD; R27	SYD; R28												42nd	255
2012	Garry Rogers Motorsport	33	Holden VE Commodore	ADE; R1	ADE; R2	SYM; R3	SYM; R4	HAM; R5	HAM; R6	BAR; R7	BAR; R8	BAR; R9	PHI; R10	PHI; R11	HID; R12	HID; R13	TOW; R14	TOW; R15	QLD; R16	QLD; R17	SMP; R18	SMP; R19	SAN; QR; 21	SAN; R20; 19	BAT; R21; 16	SUR; R22	SUR; R23	YMC; R24	YMC; R25	YMC; R26	WIN; R27	WIN; R28	SYD; R29	SYD; R30									45th	205
2013	Garry Rogers Motorsport	33	Holden VF Commodore	ADE; R1	ADE; R2	SYM; R3	SYM; R4	SYM; R5	PUK; R6	PUK; R7	PUK; R8	PUK; R9	BAR; R10	BAR; R11	BAR; R12	COA; R13	COA; R14	COA; R15	COA; R16	HID; R17	HID; R18	HID; R19	TOW; R20	TOW; R21	QLD; R22	QLD; R23	QLD; R24	WIN; R25	WIN; R26	WIN; R27	SAN; R28; 8	BAT; R29; 8	SUR; R30; 22	SUR; R31; 23	PHI; R32	PHI; R33	PHI; R34	SYD; R35	SYD; R36				39th	435
2014	Charlie Schwerkolt Racing	18	Ford FG Falcon	ADE; R1; 19	ADE; R2; 22	ADE; R3; 11	SYM; R4; 22	SYM; R5; 8	SYM; R6; 18	WIN; R7; 16	WIN; R8; 14	WIN; R9; 21	PUK; R10; 19	PUK; R11; 22	PUK; R12; 22	PUK; R13; 18	BAR; R14; 12	BAR; R15; 25	BAR; R16; 23	HID; R17; 24	HID; R18; 20	HID; R19; 21	TOW; R20; Ret	TOW; R21; 21	TOW; R22; Ret	QLD; R23; 21	QLD; R24; 25	QLD; R25; 24	SMP; R26; 15	SMP; R27; 16	SMP; R28; 19	SAN; Q 20	SAN; R29; 15	BAT; R30; 12	SUR; R31; Ret	SUR; R32; 14	PHI; R33; 16	PHI; R34; 23	PHI; R35; 20	SYD; R36; 16	SYD; R37; 22	SYD; R38; 23	23rd	1280
2015	Holden Racing Team	22	Holden VF Commodore	ADE; R1	ADE; R2	ADE; R3	SYM; R4	SYM; R5	SYM; R6	BAR; R7	BAR; R8	BAR; R9	WIN; R10	WIN; R11	WIN; R12	HID; R13	HID; R14	HID; R15	TOW; R16	TOW; R17	QLD; R18	QLD; R19	QLD; R20	SMP; R21; 19	SMP; R22; 19	SMP; R23; 11	SAN; Q Ret	SAN; R24; 9	BAT; R25; 11	SUR; R26; 5	SUR; R27; 1	PUK; R28	PUK; R29	PUK; R30	PHI; R31	PHI; R32	PHI; R33						26th	747
2015	Lucas Dumbrell Motorsport	222	Holden VF Commodore																																			SYD; R34; 17	SYD; R35; 17	SYD; R36; DSQ			26th	747
2016	Holden Racing Team	22	Holden VF Commodore	ADE; R1	ADE; R2	ADE; R3	SYM; R4	SYM; R5	PHI; R6	PHI; R7	BAR; R8	BAR; R9	WIN; R10	WIN; R11	HID; R12	HID; R13	TOW; R14	TOW; R15	QLD; R16	QLD; R17	SMP; R18	SMP; R19	SAN; Q 9	SAN; R20; 11	BAT; R21; 13	SUR; R22; 20	SUR; R23; 10	PUK; R24	PUK; R25	PUK; R26	PUK; R27	SYD; R28	SYD; R29										41st	374
2017	Walkinshaw Racing	22	Holden VF Commodore	ADE; R1	ADE; R2	SYM; R3	SYM; R4	PHI; R5	PHI; R6	BAR; R7	BAR; R8	WIN; R9	WIN; R10	HID; R11	HID; R12	TOW; R13	TOW; R14	QLD; R15	QLD; R16	SMP; R17	SMP; R18	SAN; QR; 16	SAN; R19; 10	BAT; R20; 19	SUR; R21; 14	SUR; R22; 6																	35th	495
2017	Lucas Dumbrell Motorsport	62	Holden VF Commodore																								PUK; R23; 22	PUK; R24; 22	NEW; R25	NEW; R26													35th	495
2018	Walkinshaw Andretti United	25	Holden ZB Commodore	ADE; R1	ADE; R2	MEL; R3	MEL; R4	MEL; R5	MEL; R6	SYM; R7	SYM; R8	PHI; R9	PHI; R10	BAR; R11	BAR; R12	WIN; R13	WIN; R14	HID; R15	HID; R16	TOW; R17	TOW; R18	QLD; R19	QLD; R20	SMP; R21	BEN; R22	BEN; R23	SAN; QR; 14	SAN; R24; 16	BAT; R25; Ret	SUR; R26; 3	SUR; R27; C	PUK; R28	PUK; R29	NEW; R30	NEW; R31								46th	243
2019	Walkinshaw Andretti United	22	Holden ZB Commodore	ADE; R1	ADE; R2	MEL; R3	MEL; R4	MEL; R5	MEL; R6	SYM; R7	SYM; R8	PHI; R9	PHI; R10	BAR; R11	BAR; R12	WIN; R13	WIN; R14	HID; R15	HID; R16	TOW; R17	TOW; R18	QLD; R19	QLD; R20	BEN; R21	BEN; R22	PUK; R23	PUK; R24	BAT; R25; 3	SUR; R26; 12	SUR; R27; 9	SAN; QR; 18	SAN; R28; 7	NEW; R29	NEW; R30									31st	588
2020	Brad Jones Racing	4	Holden ZB Commodore	ADE; R1	ADE; R2	MEL; R3	MEL; R4	MEL; R5	MEL; R6	SMP1; R7	SMP1; R8	SMP1; R9	SMP2; R10	SMP2; R11	SMP2; R12	HID1; R13	HID1; R14	HID1; R15	HID2; R16	HID2; R17	HID2; R18	TOW1; R19	TOW1; R20	TOW1; R21	TOW2; R22	TOW2; R23	TOW2; R24	BEN1; R25	BEN1; R26	BEN1; R27	BEN2; R28	BEN2; R29	BEN2; R30	BAT; R31; Ret									47th	0
2021	Erebus Motorsport	9	Holden ZB Commodore	BAT1; R1	BAT1; R2	SAN; R3	SAN; R4	SAN; R5	SYM; R6	SYM; R7	SYM; R8	BEN; R9	BEN; R10	BEN; R11	HID; R12	HID; R13	HID; R14	TOW1; R15	TOW1; R16	TOW2; R17	TOW2; R18	TOW2; R19	SMP1; R20	SMP1; R21	SMP1; R22	SMP2; R23	SMP2; R24	SMP2; R25	SMP3; R26	SMP3; R27	SMP3; R28	SMP4; R29	SMP4; R30	BAT2; R31; 20									44th	90
2022	Erebus Motorsport	9	Holden ZB Commodore	SMP; R1	SMP; R2	SYM; R3	SYM; R4	SYM; R5	MEL; R6	MEL; R7	MEL; R8	MEL; R9	BAR; R10	BAR; R11	BAR; R12	WIN; R13	WIN; R14	WIN; R15	HID; R16	HID; R17	HID; R18	TOW; R19	TOW; R20	BEN; R21	BEN; R22	BEN; R23	SAN; R24; PO	SAN; R25; PO	SAN; R26; PO	PUK; R27	PUK; R28	PUK; R29	BAT; R30; 10	SUR; R31	SUR; R32	NEW; R33	NEW; R34						40th	156
2023	Erebus Motorsport	9	Chevrolet Camaro ZL1	NEW; R1	NEW; R2	MEL; R3	MEL; R4	MEL; R5	MEL; R6	BAR; R7	BAR; R8	BAR; R9	SYM; R10	SYM; R11	SYM; R12	HID; R13	HID; R14	HID; R15	TOW; R16	TOW; R17	SMP; R18	SMP; R19	BEN; R20	BEN; R21	BEN; R22	SAN; R23; 4	BAT; R24; 8	SUR; R25	SUR; R26	ADE; R27	ADE; R28												29th	420
2024	Blanchard Racing Team	7	Ford Mustang S650	BAT1; R1	BAT1; R2	MEL; R3	MEL; R4	MEL; R5	MEL; R6	TAU; R7	TAU; R8	BAR; R9	BAR; R10	HID; R11	HID; R12	TOW; R13	TOW; R14	SMP; R15	SMP; R16	BEN; R17	BEN; R18	SAN; R19; 18	BAT; R20; 21	SUR; R21	SUR; R22	ADE; R23	ADE; R24																47th	186
2025	Blanchard Racing Team	7	Ford Mustang S650	SYD; R1	SYD; R2	SYD; R3	MEL; R4	MEL; R5	MEL; R6	MEL; R7	TAU; R8	TAU; R9	TAU; R10	SYM; R11	SYM; R12	SYM; R13	BAR; R14	BAR; R15	BAR; R16	HID; R17	HID; R18	HID; R19	TOW; R20	TOW; R21	TOW; R22	QLD; R23	QLD; R24	QLD; R25	BEN; R26; 17	BAT; R27; Ret	SUR; R28	SUR; R29	SAN; R30	SAN; R31	ADE; R32	ADE; R33	ADE; R34						51st	79

=== Bathurst 1000 results ===
Year	Team	Car	Co-driver	Position	Laps
2006	Perkins Engineering	Holden Commodore VZ	(Australia) Shane Price	DNF	1
2007	Perkins Engineering	Holden Commodore VE	(Australia) Shane Price	DNF	102
2008	Perkins Engineering	Holden Commodore VE	(Australia) Nathan Pretty	8th	161
2009	Kelly Racing	Holden Commodore VE	(Australia) Dale Wood	14th	160
2010	James Rosenberg Racing	Ford Falcon FG	(Australia) Tim Slade	18th	161
2011	Paul Morris Motorsport	Holden Commodore VE	(Australia) Russell Ingall	8th	161
2012	Garry Rogers Motorsport	Holden Commodore VE	(France) Alexandre Prémat	16th	161
2013	Garry Rogers Motorsport	Holden Commodore VF	(New Zealand) Scott McLaughlin	8th	161
2014	Charlie Schwerkolt Racing	Ford Falcon FG	(Australia) Cameron Waters	12th	161
2015	Holden Racing Team	Holden Commodore VF	(Australia) Russell Ingall	11th	161
2016	Holden Racing Team	Holden Commodore VF	(Australia) James Courtney	13th	161
2017	Walkinshaw Racing	Holden Commodore VF	(Australia) James Courtney	19th	147
2018	Walkinshaw Andretti United	Holden Commodore ZB	(Australia) James Courtney	DNF	33
2019	Walkinshaw Andretti United	Holden Commodore ZB	(Australia) James Courtney	**3rd**	161
2020	Brad Jones Racing	Holden Commodore ZB	(Australia) Jack Smith	DNF	149
2021	Erebus Motorsport	Holden Commodore ZB	(Australia) Will Brown	20th	150
2022	Erebus Motorsport	Holden Commodore ZB	(Australia) Will Brown	10th	161
2023	Erebus Motorsport	Chevrolet Camaro Mk.6	(Australia) Will Brown	8th	161
2024	Blanchard Racing Team	Ford Mustang S650	(Australia) James Courtney	21st	160
2025	Blanchard Racing Team	Ford Mustang S650	(Australia) James Courtney	DNF	127
2026	Triple Eight Race Engineering	Ford Mustang S650	(Australia) Jackson Walls		

=== Bathurst 12 Hour results ===
Year	Team	Co-drivers	Car	Class	Laps	Pos.	Class pos.
2007	(Australia) Holden Motorsport	(Australia) Nathan Pretty (Australia) Shane Price (New Zealand) Jason Richards	HSV VXR Coupe	C	230	15th	4th
2022	(Australia) Nineteen Corporation	(Australia) Will Brown (Australia) Mark Griffith	Mercedes-AMG GT3 Evo	A–GT3 Pro-Am	33	DNF	

=== Complete Bathurst 6 Hour results ===
Year	Team	Co-drivers	Car	Class	Laps	Pos.	Class pos.
2017	(Australia) Direct Plasterboard Outlet	(Australia) Andrew Richmond	BMW 335i E92	B1	112	8th	**1st**

=== NASCAR ===
(key) (Bold – Pole position awarded by qualifying time. Italics – Pole position earned by points standings or practice time. * – Most laps led.)

==== Xfinity Series ====
NASCAR Xfinity Series results
Year	Team	No.	Make	1	2	3	4	5	6	7	8	9	10	11	12	13	14	15	16	17	18	19	20	21	22	23	24	25	26	27	28	29	30	31	32	33	NXSC	Pts	Ref
2025	Joe Gibbs Racing	19	Toyota	DAY	ATL	COA	PHO	LVS	HOM	MAR	DAR	BRI	CAR	TAL	TEX	CLT	NSH	MXC	POC	ATL	CSC; 32	SON	DOV	IND	IOW	GLN	DAY	PIR; 31	GTW	BRI	KAN	ROV	LVS	TAL	MAR	PHO	64th	17	
