= 2016 Australian Production Car Series =

The 2016 Australian Production Car Series was an Australian motor racing series for modified production touring cars. It was the first Australian Production Car Series to be contested following the cancellation of the Australian Production Car Championship at the end of 2015.

The Series was won by Beric Lynton driving a BMW 1M.

== Classes ==
Entries competed in six classes:

- A Class for Extreme Performance
- B Class for High Performance
- C Class for Performance
- D Class for Production
- E Class for Compac
- F Class for Diesel
- I Class for Invitational.

== Teams and drivers ==
Team	Car	Class	No.	Drivers	Rounds
Sherrin Rentals	BMW 135i	B	1	(Australia) Iain Sherrin	1-3
Sherrin Rentals	BMW 135i	B	1	(Australia) Grant Sherrin	1-3
Sherrin Rentals	BMW 135i	B	19	(Australia) David Ayres	1-3
Sherrin Rentals	BMW 135i	B	19	(Australia) Michael Sherrin	2-3
Network Clothing/Dentbuster; Gosford European Car Services	Audi TTRS	A	2	(Australia) Mark Eddy	1,3
Network Clothing/Dentbuster; Gosford European Car Services	Audi TTRS	A	2	(Australia) Dean Fiore	2-3
Network Clothing/Dentbuster; Gosford European Car Services	Renault Megane	C	88	(Australia) Francois Jouy	1-3
Network Clothing/Dentbuster; Gosford European Car Services	Renault Megane	C	88	(Australia) Franck Donniaux	1-3
Network Clothing/Dentbuster; Gosford European Car Services	Renault Clio	D	97	(Australia) Carly Black	1-3
Network Clothing/Dentbuster; Gosford European Car Services	Renault Clio	D	97	(Australia) Barry Black	2-3
Falcon Fire Racing	BMW M3	C	5	(Australia) Doug Westwood	1-3
Falcon Fire Racing	BMW M3	C	5	(Australia) Daniel Sugden	1,3
Falcon Fire Racing	BMW M3	C	5	(Australia) Chad Parrish	2
Future Assist Racing	Suzuki Swift	E	6	(Australia) Scott Gore	1
Future Assist Racing	Suzuki Swift	E	6	(Australia) Patrick Galang	1
Car Mine	Suzuki Swift	E	6	(Australia) Charlie Senese	3
Hurley Smash Repairs Racing; Future Assist Racing	Suzuki Swift	E	9	(Australia) Jason Walsh	1-2
Hurley Smash Repairs Racing; Future Assist Racing	Suzuki Swift	E	9	(Australia) Paul Currie	2
Naylor Racing	Suzuki Swift	E	10	(Australia) Leigh Naylor	3
Naylor Racing	Suzuki Swift	E	10	(Australia) Mitchell Naylor	2-3
Naylor Racing	Suzuki Swift	E	11	(Australia) Mitchell Naylor	1
Naylor Racing	Suzuki Swift	E	11	(Australia) Leigh Naylor	1
Lighthouse Electrical/Jarvis	Ford Falcon AU	I	11	(Australia) Ashley Jarvis	3
Osborne Motorsport	Renault Megane RS	C	13	(Australia) Colin Osborne	1-3
Osborne Motorsport	Renault Megane RS	C	13	(Australia) Ricky Bates	1
Osborne Motorsport	Renault Megane RS	C	13	(Australia) Hadrian Morrall	2-3
Osborne Motorsport	Renault Megane RS	C	31	(Australia) Robert Hughes	1
Osborne Motorsport	Renault Megane RS	C	31	(Australia) Adrian Mastronardo	1
Osborne Motorsport	Renault Megane RS	C	31	(Australia) Scott Gore	2
Osborne Motorsport	Renault Megane RS	C	31	(Australia) Patrick Galang	2-3
Osborne Motorsport	Renault Megane RS	C	31	(Australia) Keith Bensley	3
Lauren Gray Motorsport	Toyota Echo	E	15	(Australia) Liam Thompson	1-3
Lauren Gray Motorsport	Toyota Echo	E	15	(Australia) Ellexandrea Best	2
Hi-Tec Oil	Holden CSV Mondo GT	B	16	(Australia) Steve Hodges	3
Hi-Tec Oil	Holden CSV Mondo GT	B	16	(Australia) Gerry Murphy	3
Melbourne Performance Centre	Mitsubishi Evo 10	A	21	(Australia) Rod Salmon	2
Griffith Corporation	Mitsubishi Evo 10	A	21	(Australia) Daniel Gaunt	3
Bruce Lynton Prestige Auto	BMW 1M	A	23	(Australia) Beric Lynton	1-3
PRO-DUCT CASTROL DBA	Mitsubishi Evo 10	A	33	(Australia) Bob Pearson	2-3
PRO-DUCT CASTROL DBA	Mitsubishi Evo 10	A	33	(Australia) Ricky Bates	2-3
Casabene Group/Karadimas Motorsport	Ford Falcon XR6 Turbo	C	34	(Australia) George Karadimas	1-3
Dount King	Audi TTRS	A	54	(Australia) Tony Alford	1-2
Dount King	Audi TTRS	A	54	(Australia) Stuart Kostera	1-2
Dount King	BMW M1	A	54	(Australia) Anthony Alford	3
Dount King	BMW M1	I	55	(Australia) Aaron Seton	2
Dount King	BMW M1	I	55	(Australia) Kyle Alford	2
Dount King	Mitsubishi Mirage	I	55	(Australia) Kyle Alford	3
Dount King	Mitsubishi Mirage	I	55	(Australia) Carey McMahon	3
Hare Motorsport/Declan Kirkham Racing/Inertia	Mazda Euros	E	55	(Australia) Michael Hopp	1
Hare Motorsport/Declan Kirkham Racing/Inertia	Mazda MX6	D	85	(Australia) Phil Kirkham	1
Roadchill Freight Express	BMW M135i	A	62	(Australia) Luke Searle	1-3
Roadchill Freight Express	BMW M135i	A	62	(Australia) Paul Morris	1-2
TOA57d Motorsport	Suzuki Swift	E	72	(Australia) Alan Jarvis	3
TOA57d Motorsport	Suzuki Swift	E	72	(Australia) Rob Jarvis	3
Black Arts Racing	Holden Commodore SSV Redline	C	76	(Australia) Troy Williams	1
Pedders Motorsport Training Australia	Toyota 86 GTS	D	86	(Australia) Grant Phillips	1,3
Pedders Motorsport Training Australia	Toyota 86 GTS	D	86	(Australia) Andrew Turpie	1-3
Katilyn Hawkins/Richard Luff	Suzuki Swift	E	223	(Australia) Katilyn Hawkins	1
Katilyn Hawkins/Richard Luff	Suzuki Swift	E	223	(Australia) Richard Luff	1

== Race calendar ==
The series was contested over four rounds.

Round	Circuit	City / state	Date	Format
1	(Victoria (state)) Phillip Island Grand Prix Circuit	Phillip Island, Victoria	27–29 May	1 x 4 hours
2	(New South Wales) Sydney Motorsport Park	Sydney, New South Wales	1–3 July	2 x 250 km
3	Queensland Raceway	Ipswich, Queensland	29–31 July	1 x 300 km 1 x 250 km
4	(New South Wales) Sydney Motorsport Park	Sydney, New South Wales	11–13 November	1 x 4 hours

== Series standings ==
The series was won by Beric Lynton driving a BMW 1M.

Pos.	Driver	PHI (Victoria (state))	SMP (New South Wales)	QLD (Queensland)	SMP (New South Wales)	Pts.
