= Project Wickenby =

Australian tax investigation, 2005–2015

Project Wickenby was a long-running joint-agency investigation initiated by the Australian Government in 2005 to combat offshore tax evasion. The investigation was jointly run by the Australian Taxation Office, Australian Securities and Investments Commission, the Australian Federal Police and the Australian Crime Commission.

After 76 people were charged and 46 convictions recorded, the investigation concluded on 30 June 2015.

According to the Australian Taxation Office, Project Wickenby was responsible for recouping $985.67 million.

== Background ==
Although Project Wickenby became public in 2005, the operation was prompted by the discovery of a laptop computer during an Australian Crime Commission raid in February 2004, when the hotel suite at the Sheraton Towers in Melbourne where Swiss accountant Philip Egglishaw was staying was searched. Egglishaw was meeting with corporate lawyer Michael Brereton, who is believed to have been the target of the raid. However, Egglishaw's seized laptop was discovered to have the details of hundreds of Australians allegedly linked to his offshore accountancy business, Strachans, based in the Channel Islands.

During Project Wickenby, numerous examples of fraudulent activities were uncovered including false invoices, sham loans, fake asset transfers, hidden share trading and sham labour hire along with various dubious ways of repatriating funds back to Australia such as holding accounts offshore to avoid audit trails.

== High-profile targets ==
Project Wickenby is noted for investigating several high-profile figures including actors Paul Hogan and John Cornell as well as music industry executive Glenn Wheatley.

Former cricketers Allan Border and Shane Warne were also questioned during the investigation.

Cornell and Hogan were eventually cleared of any wrongdoing and reached a "without admission" settlement with the ATO in 2012. Hogan had been previously banned from leaving Australia after attending his mother's funeral in 2010 while the ATO pursued Hogan.

However, Wheatley pleaded guilty in 2007 to three tax-related charges including a failure to declare nearly $300,000 he made from a John Farnham tour and his earnings from a 2003 Kostya Tszyu boxing match. Wheatley was sentenced to fifteen months in prison by the Victorian County Court.

== Other targets ==
Three company directors who were arrested in June 2005 on the Gold Coast were the first to be charged as part of the investigation. The Gold Coast businessmen were named as Adam Hargraves and two shareholders in his publishing company Phone Directories Co (PDC), his brother Glenn Hargraves and Daniel Stoten.

The three men were arrested after police raided their homes, the company's head office and the home of Adam Hargraves's accountant. Phone Directories Co Pty Ltd published telephone books in regional areas of Australia including Rockhampton and Mackay. The company is now known as Local Directories.

While Glenn Hargraves was later found not guilty, Adam Hargraves and Daniel Stoten were found guilty by a Supreme Court jury of charges of conspiring to defraud a Commonwealth entity after defrauding the tax office of $2.2 million. They were sentenced to 6½ years' jail.

However, Hargraves and Stoten's lawyers appealed both the conviction and sentence. The Court of Appeal dismissed both appeals against the convictions but the two men were resentenced, this time to five years' jail replacing the original sentence of 6½ years.

Accountant Philip de Figueiredo was implicated in both the Hargraves case and the Wheatley case, and he pleaded guilty to one count of conspiring with Wheatley to defraud the Commonwealth to cause a loss and two similar charges connected to the Hargraves and Stoten case on the Gold Coast where it was discovered de Figueiredo had set up a network of offshore companies to inflate the business expenses of Hargraves and Stoten.

An international arrest warrant was issued for Philip Egglishaw in 2013 after it was alleged he stole $34 million from Paul Hogan's Swiss bank account. Egglishaw denied the allegation, describing the accusations as 'completely false'. While attempting to leave Switzerland in May 2017, Egglishaw triggered a red notice, which drew attention to his wanted status and was subsequently arrested by Italian authorities. He was released in July 2017 after the Australian prosecutor's office did not turn up to the hearing.
