= Porsche Sprint Challenge Australia =

Sports car racing series

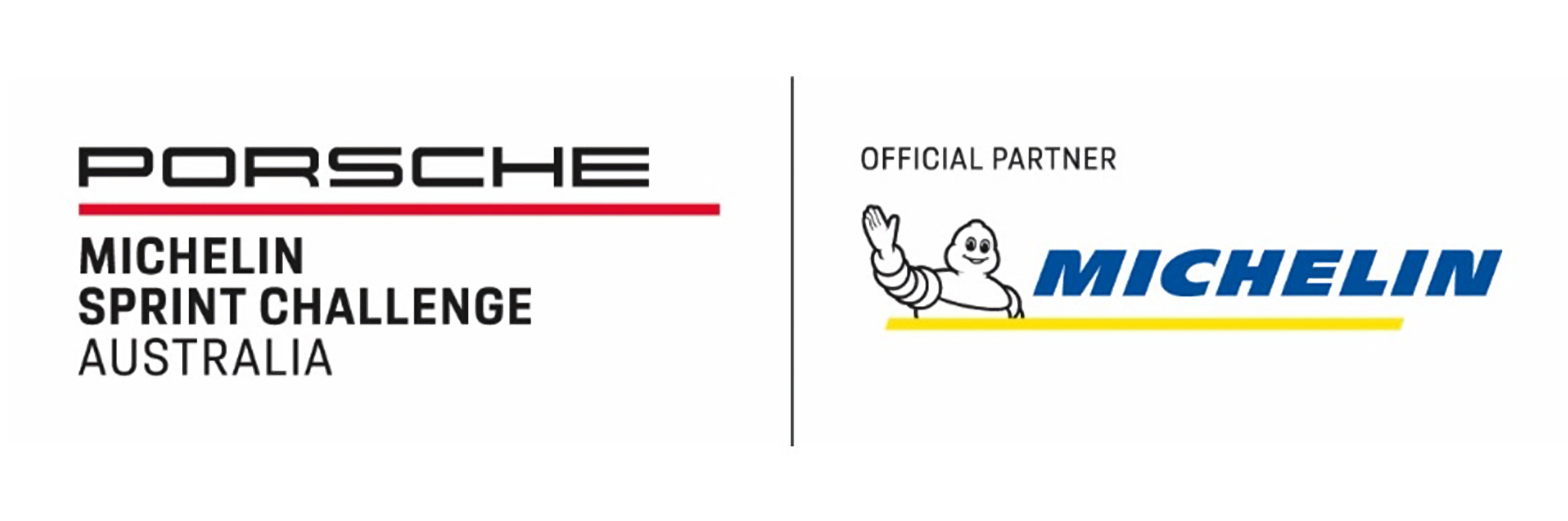
- Category: One-make racing by Porsche
- Country: Australia
- Inaugural season: 2008
- Drivers: 29
- Teams: 13
- Constructors: Porsche
- Tyre suppliers: Michelin
- Drivers' champion: (Australia) Lincoln Taylor
- Teams' champion: (Australia) TekworkX Motorsport
- Official website: Porsche Sprint Challenge Australia

The Porsche Michelin Sprint Challenge Australia (formerly Porsche GT3 Cup Challenge Australia) is a sports car racing series open to drivers of Porsche 911 GT3 Cup cars. The series was first held in 2008 to fill the void between club racing and the Australian Carrera Cup Championship and Australian GT Championship for Porsche owners. The series currently consists of Type 991 Gen I and Type 991 Gen II Porsche 911 GT3 Cup cars, with each model competing in a different class, though other models are eligible to compete.

The series runs on the Shannons Nationals Motor Racing Championships calendar, holding six rounds in the years season.

== Series Winners ==
Season	Series winner	Car Model
2008	(Australia) Sven Burchartz	Porsche 911 GT3 Cup Type 996
2009	(Australia) Matthew Kingsley	Porsche 911 GT3 Cup Type 996
2010	(Australia) Roger Lago	Porsche 911 GT3 Cup Type 997
2011	(Australia) Roger Lago	Porsche 911 GT3 Cup Type 997
2012	(Australia) Kane Rose	Porsche 911 GT3 Cup Type 997
2013	(Australia) Richard Muscat	Porsche 911 GT3 Cup Type 997
2014	(Australia) Fraser Ross	Porsche 911 GT3 Cup Type 997 3.8
2015	(Australia) Ryan Simpson	Porsche 911 GT3 Cup Type 997 3.8
2016	(Australia) Hamish Hardeman	Porsche 911 GT3 Cup Type 997 3.8
2017	(Australia) Jordan Love	Porsche 911 GT3 Cup Type 997 3.8
2018	(Australia) Simon Fallon	Porsche 911 GT3 Cup Type 991
2019	(Australia) Harri Jones	Porsche 911 GT3 Cup Type 991
2020	Not Awarded	
2021	Not Awarded	
2022	(Australia) Thomas Sargent	Porsche 911 GT3 Cup Type 991.II
2023	(New Zealand) Marco Giltrap	Porsche 911 GT3 Cup Type 991.II
2024	(Australia) Oscar Targett	Porsche 911 GT3 Cup Type 991.II
2025	(Australia) Jake Santalucia	Porsche 911 GT3 Cup Type 991.II
2026	(Australia) Lincoln Taylor	Porsche 911 GT3 Cup Type 991.II

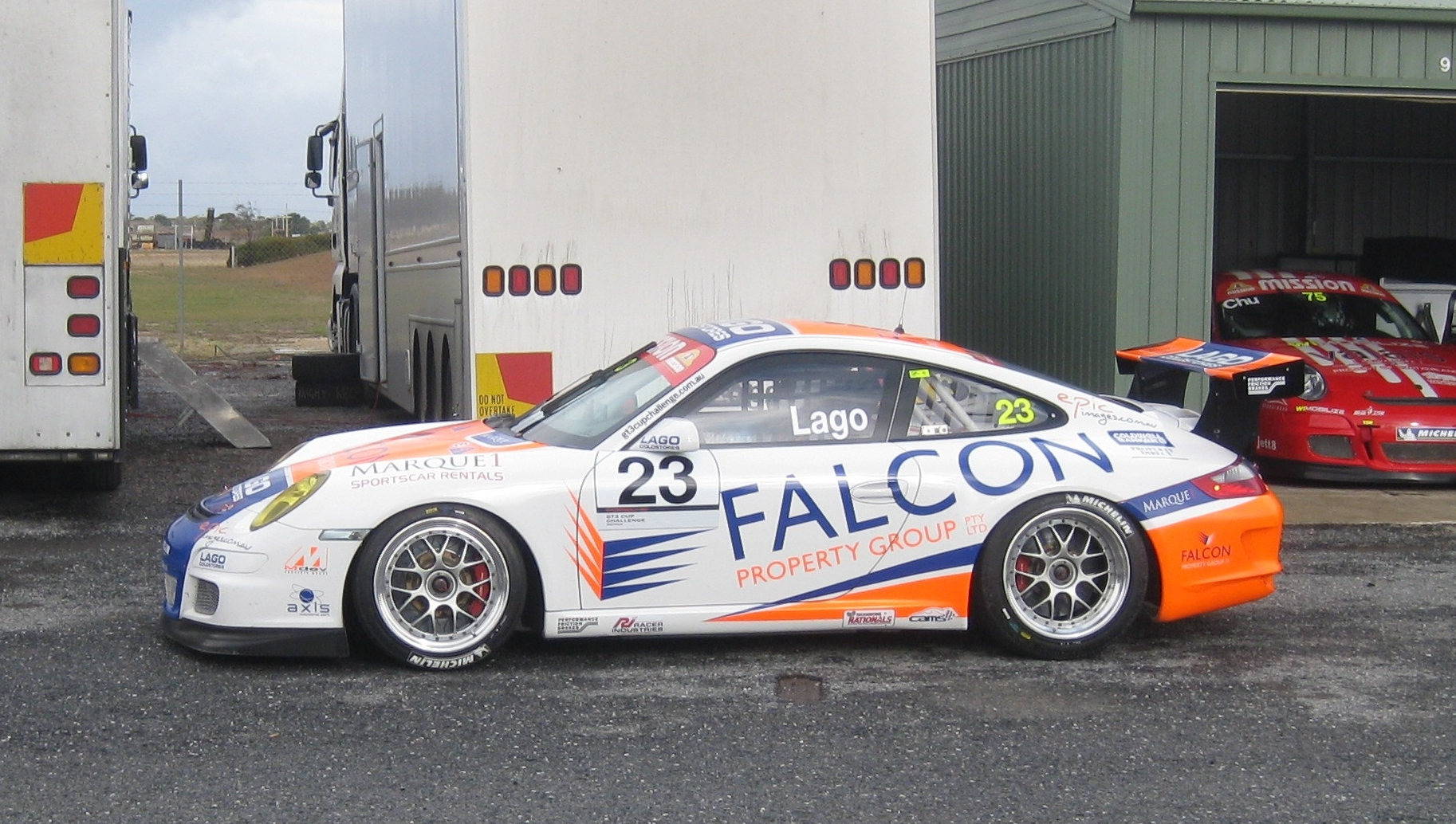
The Porsche 911 GT3 Cup Type 997 of Roger Lago, who won the series in 2010 and 2011.

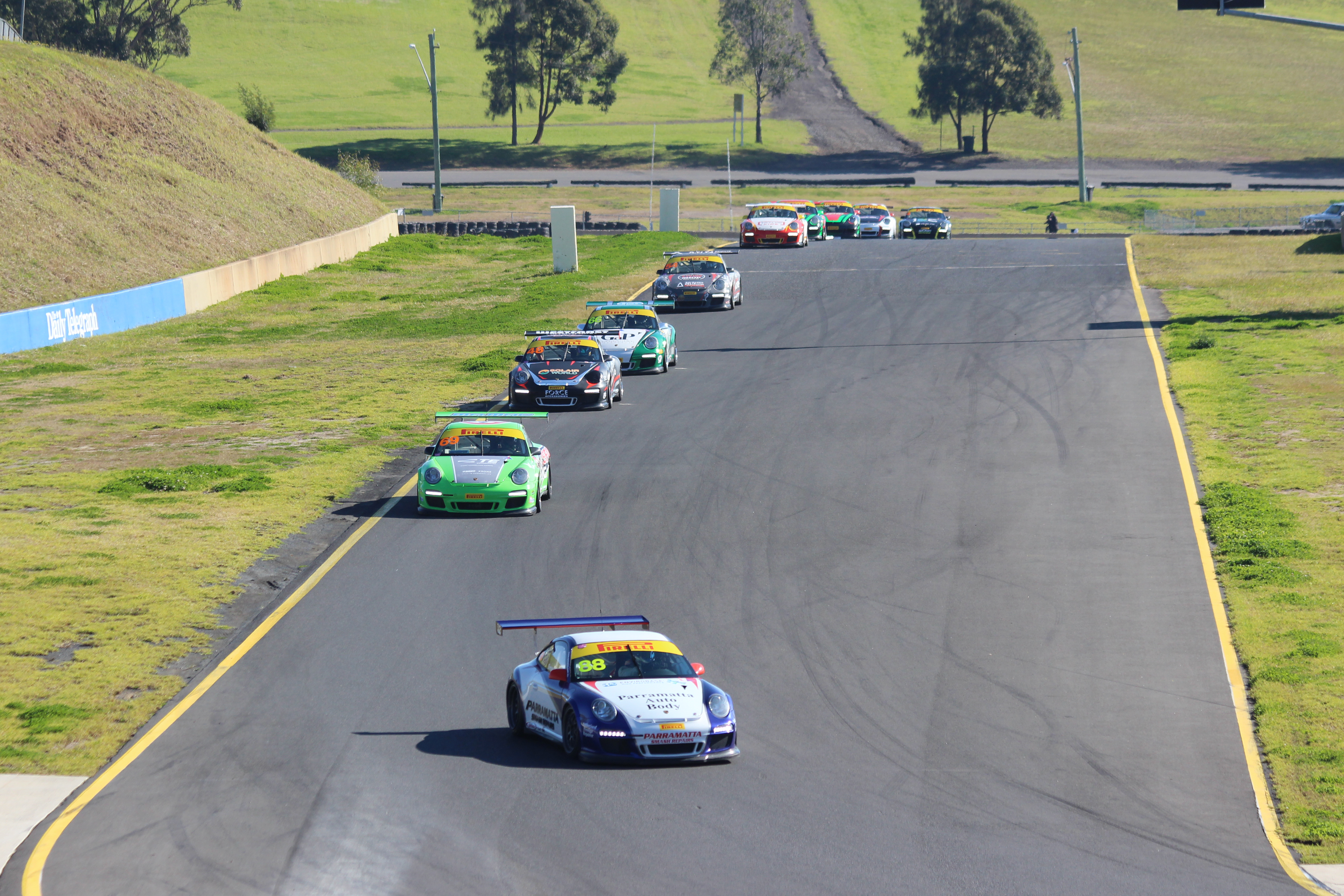
The first lap of a GT3 Cup Challenge race at Sydney Motorsport Park in 2015.
